= 2003 Qatar Total Fina Elf Open =

- Date: 10–16 February
- Edition: 3rd
- Category: WTA Tier III
- Draw: 30S / 16D
- Prize money: USD170,000
- Surface: Hard, outdoor
- Location: Doha, Qatar
- Venue: Khalifa International Tennis and Squash Complex

Champions

Singles
- (Russia) Anastasia Myskina

Doubles
- (Chinese Taipei) Janet Lee / (Indonesia) Wynne Prakusya
- Qatar Ladies Open

The 2003 Qatar Total Open was a professional women's tennis tournament played on hard courts. It was the 3rd edition of the event and part of the WTA Tier III series of the 2003 WTA Tour. It took place at the International Tennis and Squash complex in Doha, Qatar between 10 and 16 February 2003. Second-seeded Anastasia Myskina won the singles title.

== Finals ==
=== Singles ===
(Russia) Anastasia Myskina defeated (Russia) Elena Likhovtseva, 6–3, 6–1

- It was the 1st title in the year for Myskina and the 3rd title in her career.

=== Doubles ===
(Chinese Taipei) Janet Lee / (Indonesia) Wynne Prakusya defeated (Venezuela) María Vento-Kabchi / (Indonesia) Angelique Widjaja, 6–1, 6–3

- It was the 3rd title for Lee and the 2nd title for Prakusya in their respective doubles careers.

== Points and prize money ==
=== Point distribution ===
Event	W	F	SF	QF	Round of 16	Round of 32	Q	Q3	Q2	Q1
Singles	120	85	55	30	16	1	?	3.75	2.25	1
Doubles	120	85	55	30	1	—N/a	?	—N/a	—N/a	—N/a

=== Prize money ===
Event	W	F	SF	QF	Round of 16	Round of 32	Q3	Q2	Q1
Singles	$27,000	$14,500	$7,500	$4,000	$2,200	$1,300	$650	$350	$200
Doubles *	$8,000	$4,250	$2,250	$1,225	$650	—N/a	—N/a	—N/a	—N/a

_{* per team}

== Singles main-draw entrants ==
=== Seeds ===
Country	Player	Rank^{1}	Seed
USA	Monica Seles	9	1
RUS	Anastasia Myskina	11	2
BUL	Magdalena Maleeva	14	3
THA	Tamarine Tanasugarn	32	4
RUS	Elena Likhovtseva	36	5
ITA	Francesca Schiavone	37	6
ESP	Conchita Martínez	39	7
AUS	Nicole Pratt	44	8

- ^{1} Rankings as of February 3, 2003.

=== Other entrants ===
The following players received wildcards into the singles main draw:

- (Russia) Lina Krasnoroutskaya
- (Venezuela) María Vento-Kabchi

The following players received entry from the qualifying draw:

- (United Kingdom) Lucie Ahl
- (Spain) Arantxa Parra Santonja
- (China) Sun Tiantian
- (China) Zheng Jie

=== Retirements ===
- (Spain) Conchita Martínez (left achilles)

== Doubles main-draw entrants ==
=== Seeds ===
Country	Player	Country	Player	Rank^{1}	Seed
ZIM	Cara Black	RUS	Elena Likhovtseva	17	1
HUN	Petra Mandula	AUT	Patricia Wartusch	48	2
TPE	Janet Lee	INA	Wynne Prakusya	50	3
RUS	Svetlana Kuznetsova	USA	Martina Navratilova	67	4

- ^{1} Rankings as of February 3, 2003.

=== Other entrants ===
The following pairs received wildcards into the doubles main draw:

- (Spain) Gala León García / (Tunisia) Selima Sfar
- (Russia) Anastasia Myskina / (Russia) Dinara Safina

The following pairs received entry from the qualifying draw:

- (China) Yan Zi / (China) Zheng Jie
