= 2003 Qatar Total Fina Elf Open – Doubles =

Doubles
- 2003 Qatar Total Fina Elf Open

Final
- Champions: (Chinese Taipei) Janet Lee (Indonesia) Wynne Prakusya
- Runners-up: (Venezuela) María Vento-Kabchi (Indonesia) Angelique Widjaja
- Score: 6–1, 6–3

Details
- Draw: 16
- Seeds: 4

Events
Singles	Doubles
← 2002 ·	Qatar Ladies Open	· 2004 →

Janette Husárová and Arantxa Sánchez Vicario were the defending champions, but did not compete this year.

Janet Lee and Wynne Prakusya won the title by defeating María Vento-Kabchi and Angelique Widjaja 6–1, 6–3 in the final.

== Seeds ==
1. (Zimbabwe) Cara Black / (Russia) Elena Likhovtseva (semifinals)
2. (Hungary) Petra Mandula / (Austria) Patricia Wartusch (semifinals)
3. (Chinese Taipei) Janet Lee / (Indonesia) Wynne Prakusya (champions)
4. (Russia) Svetlana Kuznetsova / (United States) Martina Navratilova (quarterfinals)

== Draw ==
Key

- Q = Qualifier
- WC = Wild card
- LL = Lucky loser
- Alt = Alternate
- ITF = ITF entry
- PR = Protected ranking
- SR = Special ranking
- SE = Special exempt
- JE = Junior exempt
- JR = Junior Accelerator Programme entrant
- CO = College Accelerator Programme entrant
- NG = Next Gen Accelerator Program entrant
- w/o = Walkover
- r = Retired
- d = Defaulted

=== Draw ===
First round
1	(Zimbabwe) C Black (Russia) E Likhovtseva	6	3	6
(Russia) L Krasnoroutskaya (Australia) N Pratt	2	6	2
(Germany) M Müller (Australia) T Musgrave	2	2
(France) M Pierce (Uzbekistan) I Tulyaganova	6	6
4	(Russia) S Kuznetsova (United States) M Navratilova	7	5	6
Q	(China) Z Yan (China) J Zheng	5	7	4
(Switzerland) E Gagliardi (Bulgaria) M Maleeva	6^{3}	1
(Venezuela) M Vento-Kabchi (Indonesia) A Widjaja	7^{7}	6
(Paraguay) R de los Ríos (Italy) Ad Serra Zanetti	6	5	6
WC	(Spain) G León García (Tunisia) S Sfar	0	7	4
WC	(Russia) A Myskina (Russia) D Safina	6	0	4
3	(Chinese Taipei) J Lee (Indonesia) W Prakusya	3	6	6
(South Africa) N de Villiers (Kazakhstan) I Selyutina	4	4
(Australia) E Dominikovic (Croatia) J Kostanić	6	6
(Italy) F Schiavone (Argentina) P Tarabini	5	6^{5}
2	(Hungary) P Mandula (Austria) P Wartusch	7	7^{7}

Quarterfinals
1	(Zimbabwe) C Black (Russia) E Likhovtseva	6	6
(France) M Pierce (Uzbekistan) I Tulyaganova	3	3
4	(Russia) S Kuznetsova (United States) M Navratilova	4	6^{3}
(Venezuela) M Vento-Kabchi (Indonesia) A Widjaja	6	7^{7}
(Paraguay) R de los Ríos (Italy) Ad Serra Zanetti	1	2
3	(Chinese Taipei) J Lee (Indonesia) W Prakusya	6	6
(Australia) E Dominikovic (Croatia) J Kostanić	0	7^{7}	3
2	(Hungary) P Mandula (Austria) P Wartusch	6	6^{5}	6

Semifinals
1	(Zimbabwe) C Black (Russia) E Likhovtseva	6^{3}	4
(Venezuela) M Vento-Kabchi (Indonesia) A Widjaja	7^{7}	6
3	(Chinese Taipei) J Lee (Indonesia) W Prakusya	6^{3}	6	6
2	(Hungary) P Mandula (Austria) P Wartusch	7^{7}	2	1

Final
(Venezuela) M Vento-Kabchi (Indonesia) A Widjaja	1	3
3	(Chinese Taipei) J Lee (Indonesia) W Prakusya	6	6

== Qualifying ==
=== Seeds ===
1. (Belarus) Tatiana Poutchek / (Czech Republic) Renata Voráčová (first round)
2. (South Africa) Natalie Grandin / (South Africa) Kim Grant (qualifying competition)

=== Qualifiers ===
1. (China) Yan Zi / (China) Zheng Jie

=== Draw ===
First round
1	(Belarus) Tatiana Poutchek (Czech Republic) Renata Voráčová	4
(China) Yan Zi (China) Zheng Jie	8
WC	(India) Sania Mirza (United States) Sunitha Rao	4
2	(South Africa) Natalie Grandin (South Africa) Kim Grant	8

Qualifying competition
(China) Yan Zi (China) Zheng Jie	6	6^{5}	6
2	(South Africa) Natalie Grandin (South Africa) Kim Grant	4	7^{7}	2
