= 2005 Qatar Ladies Open – Doubles =

Doubles
- 2005 Qatar Ladies Open

Final
- Champion: (Australia) Alicia Molik (Italy) Francesca Schiavone
- Runner-up: (Zimbabwe) Cara Black (South Africa) Liezel Huber
- Score: 6–3, 6–4

Events
Singles	Doubles
← 2004 ·	Qatar Ladies Open	· 2006 →

Svetlana Kuznetsova and Elena Likhovtseva were the defending champions, but both chose not to compete in 2005.

Alicia Molik and Francesca Schiavone won the title.

== Seeds ==
1. (Spain) Virginia Ruano Pascual / (Argentina) Paola Suárez (first round)
2. (Zimbabwe) Cara Black / (South Africa) Liezel Huber (final)
3. (Russia) Anastasia Myskina / (Japan) Ai Sugiyama (first round)
4. (Spain) Conchita Martínez / (Australia) Nicole Pratt (first round)

== Draw ==
=== Key ===
- Q = Qualifier
- WC = Wild card
- LL = Lucky loser
- Alt = Alternate
- SE = Special exempt
- PR = Protected ranking
- ITF = ITF entry
- JE = Junior exempt
- w/o = Walkover
- r = Retired
- d = Defaulted
- SR = Special ranking

=== Results ===
First round
1	(Spain) V Ruano Pascual (Argentina) P Suárez	5	7	3
(Australia) A Molik (Italy) F Schiavone	7	5	6
WC	(Slovakia) D Hantuchová (Bulgaria) M Maleeva	6^{4}	2
WC	(France) S Cohen-Aloro (Tunisia) S Sfar	7	6
4	(Spain) C Martínez (Australia) N Pratt	5	3
(Australia) B Stewart (Australia) S Stosur	7	6
(France) S Testud (Italy) R Vinci	5	6	6
(Argentina) G Dulko (Venezuela) M Vento-Kabchi	7	4	4
(China) T Li (China) T Sun	2	4
(Japan) S Asagoe (Italy) ME Camerin	6	6
(Italy) T Garbin (Croatia) J Kostanić	6	6^{2}	6
3	(Russia) A Myskina (Japan) A Sugiyama	4	7	1
Q	(Russia) M Kirilenko (Croatia) S Talaja	3	6	6^{5}
(China) Z Yan (China) J Zheng	6	4	7
(France) M Bartoli (Italy) S Farina Elia	6	6^{2}	4
2	(Zimbabwe) C Black (South Africa) L Huber	3	7	6

Quarterfinals
(Australia) A Molik (Italy) F Schiavone	6	1	6
WC	(France) S Cohen-Aloro (Tunisia) S Sfar	1	6	2
(Australia) B Stewart (Australia) S Stosur	6	6^{4}	4
(France) S Testud (Italy) R Vinci	1	7	6
(Japan) S Asagoe (Italy) ME Camerin	6	2	4
(Italy) T Garbin (Croatia) J Kostanić	0	6	6
(China) Z Yan (China) J Zheng	6	1	4
2	(Zimbabwe) C Black (South Africa) L Huber	3	6	6

Semifinals
(Australia) A Molik (Italy) F Schiavone	6	6
(France) S Testud (Italy) R Vinci	4	2
(Italy) T Garbin (Croatia) J Kostanić	2	4
2	(Zimbabwe) C Black (South Africa) L Huber	6	6

Final
(Australia) A Molik (Italy) F Schiavone	6	6
2	(Zimbabwe) C Black (South Africa) L Huber	3	4
