= 2021 Qatar Total Open =

Women's tennis tournament

- Date: 1–6 March
- Edition: 19th
- Category: WTA 500
- Draw: 28S / 16D
- Prize money: $565,530
- Surface: Hard
- Location: Doha, Qatar
- Venue: Khalifa International Tennis and Squash Complex

Champions

Singles
- (Czech Republic) Petra Kvitová

Doubles
- (United States) Nicole Melichar / (Netherlands) Demi Schuurs
- Qatar Open

The 2021 Qatar Total Open was a professional women's tennis tournament, played in Doha, Qatar between the 1st and the 6th of March 2021. The tournament was played on hard courts at the International Tennis and Squash Complex, and was a WTA 500 event on the 2021 WTA Tour. Typically played in February one to two weeks following the Australian Open, the tournament was played in March this year in order to adjust for the delayed start of the 2021 tournament, which was held three weeks later than usual due to the COVID-19 pandemic.

== Finals ==
=== Singles ===
- (Czech Republic) Petra Kvitová def. (Spain) Garbiñe Muguruza, 6–2, 6–1.

It was Kvitová's first title of 2021 and the 28th of her career.

=== Doubles ===
- (United States) Nicole Melichar / (Netherlands) Demi Schuurs def. (Romania) Monica Niculescu / (Latvia) Jeļena Ostapenko, 6–2, 2–6, [10–8]

== Points and prize money ==
=== Point distribution ===
Event	W	F	SF	QF	Round of 16	Round of 32	Q	Q3	Q2	Q1
Singles	470	305	185	100	55	1	25	18	13	1
Doubles	470	305	185	100	1	—N/a	—N/a	—N/a	—N/a	—N/a

=== Prize money ===
Event	W	F	SF	QF	Round of 16	Round of 32^{1}	Q3	Q2	Q1
Singles	$68,570	$51,000	$32,400	$15,500	$8,200	$6,650	$3,295	$2,350	$1,800
Doubles*	$25,230	$17,750	$10,000	$5,500	$3,500	—N/a	—N/a	—N/a	—N/a

_{^{1}Qualifiers prize money is also the Round of 32 prize money.}
_{*per team}

== Singles main-draw entrants ==
=== Seeds ===
Country	Player	Rank^{1}	Seed
UKR	Elina Svitolina	5	1
CZE	Karolína Plíšková	6	2
BLR	Aryna Sabalenka	8	3
CZE	Petra Kvitová	10	4
NED	Kiki Bertens	11	5
SUI	Belinda Bencic	12	6
USA	Jennifer Brady	13	7
BLR	Victoria Azarenka	14	8

- ^{1} Rankings determined by February 22, 2021.

=== Other entrants ===
The following players will receive wildcards into the singles main draw:

- (Belarus) Victoria Azarenka
- (Turkey) Çağla Büyükakçay
- (Latvia) Jeļena Ostapenko
- (Egypt) Mayar Sherif

The following player received entry into the singles main draw using a protected ranking:

- (China) Zheng Saisai

The following players received entry from the qualifying draw:

- (Russia) Anna Blinkova
- (United States) Jessica Pegula
- (Czech Republic) Kristýna Plíšková
- (Germany) Laura Siegemund

The following player received entry as a lucky loser:

- (Japan) Misaki Doi

=== Withdrawals ===
Before the tournament

- (Canada) Bianca Andreescu → replaced by (Tunisia) Ons Jabeur
- (United States) Amanda Anisimova → replaced by (Japan) Misaki Doi
- (Australia) Ashleigh Barty → replaced by (China) Wang Qiang
- (Romania) Simona Halep → replaced by (United States) Amanda Anisimova
- (United States) Sofia Kenin → replaced by (Russia) Anastasia Pavlyuchenkova
- (Poland) Iga Świątek → replaced by (Russia) Svetlana Kuznetsova
- (Czech Republic) Markéta Vondroušová → replaced by (China) Zheng Saisai

During the tournament

- (Belarus) Victoria Azarenka

== Doubles main-draw entrants ==
=== Seeds ===
Country	Player	Country	Player	Rank^{1}	Seed
CZE	Barbora Krejčíková	CZE	Kateřina Siniaková	15	1
USA	Nicole Melichar	NED	Demi Schuurs	23	2
JPN	Shuko Aoyama	JPN	Ena Shibahara	29	3
RUS	Anna Blinkova	CAN	Gabriela Dabrowski	59	4

- Rankings determined by February 22, 2021.

=== Other entrants ===
The following pairs will receive wildcards into the doubles main draw:

- (Turkey) Çağla Büyükakçay / (Russia) Anastasia Pavlyuchenkova
- (Germany) Laura Siegemund / (Russia) Elena Vesnina

The following pair received entry into the doubles main draw using a protected ranking:

- (Slovenia) Andreja Klepač / (India) Sania Mirza

The following pair received entry as alternates:

- (Uzbekistan) Akgul Amanmuradova / (Chinese Taipei) Liang En-shuo

=== Withdrawals ===
Before the tournament

- (United States) Hayley Carter / (Brazil) Luisa Stefani → replaced by (Uzbekistan) Akgul Amanmuradova / (Chinese Taipei) Liang En-shuo
- (China) Xu Yifan / (China) Yang Zhaoxuan → replaced by (Kazakhstan) Elena Rybakina / (Kazakhstan) Yaroslava Shvedova
- (China) Zhang Shuai / (China) Zheng Saisai → replaced by (China) Zheng Saisai / (China) Zhu Lin
