= 2008 Qatar Ladies Open – Doubles =

Doubles
- 2008 Qatar Ladies Open

Final
- Champions: (Czech Republic) Květa Peschke (Australia) Rennae Stubbs
- Runners-up: (Zimbabwe) Cara Black (United States) Liezel Huber
- Score: 6–1, 5–7, [10–7]

Events
Singles	Doubles
← 2007 ·	Qatar Ladies Open	· 2009 →

Martina Hingis and Maria Kirilenko were the defending champions, but Hingis retired on November 1, 2007, and Kirilenko teamed up with Ágnes Szávay.

Květa Peschke and Rennae Stubbs won in the final 6–1, 5–7, [10–7], against Cara Black and Liezel Huber.

== Seeds ==
The top four seeds receive a bye into the second round.

1. (Zimbabwe) Cara Black / (United States) Liezel Huber (final)
2. (Slovenia) Katarina Srebotnik / (Japan) Ai Sugiyama (semifinals)
3. (Czech Republic) Květa Peschke / (Australia) Rennae Stubbs (champions)
4. (Chinese Taipei) Yung-jan Chan / (Chinese Taipei) Chia-jung Chuang (quarterfinals)
5. (France) Nathalie Dechy / (Russia) Dinara Safina (second round)
6. (China) Yan Zi / (China) Zheng Jie (second round)
7. (Spain) Anabel Medina Garrigues / (Spain) Virginia Ruano Pascual (quarterfinals)
8. (Italy) Tathiana Garbin / (Israel) Shahar Pe'er (first round)

== Draw ==
=== Key ===
- Q = Qualifier
- WC = Wild card
- LL = Lucky loser
- Alt = Alternate
- SE = Special exempt
- PR = Protected ranking
- ITF = ITF entry
- JE = Junior exempt
- w/o = Walkover
- r = Retired
- d = Defaulted
- SR = Special ranking

=== Finals ===
Semifinals
1	(Zimbabwe) Cara Black (United States) Liezel Huber	7	6
WC	(Czech Republic) Lucie Šafářová (Russia) Vera Zvonareva	5	2
3	(Czech Republic) Květa Peschke (Australia) Rennae Stubbs	6	6
2	(Slovenia) Katarina Srebotnik (Japan) Ai Sugiyama	2	0

Final
1	(Zimbabwe) Cara Black (United States) Liezel Huber	1	7	[7]
3	(Czech Republic) Květa Peschke (Australia) Rennae Stubbs	6	5	[10]

=== Top half ===
First round
WC	(Germany) V Henke (Germany) K Wörle	6^{6}	4
(Russia) Y Shvedova (Czech Republic) V Uhlířová	7	6
(Russia) M Kirilenko (Hungary) Á Szávay	4	3
(Russia) E Makarova (Poland) U Radwańska	6	6
(Romania) A Ehritt-Vanc (Thailand) T Tanasugarn	1	2
7	(Spain) A Garrigues (Spain) V Pascual	6	6
WC	(United States) V Williams (Denmark) C Wozniacki	6	4	[10]
(Russia) V Dushevina (Russia) E Likhovtseva	0	6	[8]
(Russia) A Rodionova (Russia) A Rodionova	6	6
(Japan) A Morigami (Japan) A Nakamura	3	3
WC	(Czech Republic) L Šafářová (Russia) V Zvonareva	6	6
8	(Italy) T Garbin (Israel) S Pe'er	1	4

Second round
1	(Zimbabwe) C Black (United States) L Huber	5	6	[10]
(Russia) Y Shvedova (Czech Republic) V Uhlířová	7	4	[3]
(Russia) E Makarova (Poland) U Radwańska	0	3
7	(Spain) A Garrigues (Spain) V Pascual	6	6
4	(Chinese Taipei) Y-j Chan (Chinese Taipei) C-j Chuang	6	6
WC	(United States) V Williams (Denmark) C Wozniacki	2	3
(Russia) A Rodionova (Russia) A Rodionova	6^{5}	6^{6}
WC	(Czech Republic) L Šafářová (Russia) V Zvonareva	7	7

Quarterfinals
1	(Zimbabwe) C Black (United States) L Huber	6	6^{1}	[10]
7	(Spain) A Medina Garrigues (Spain) V Ruano Pascual	2	7	[2]
4	(Chinese Taipei) Y-j Chan (Chinese Taipei) C-j Chang	6	4	[6]
WC	(Czech Republic) L Šafářová (Russia) V Zvonareva	4	6	[10]

Semifinals
1	(Zimbabwe) C Black (United States) L Huber	7	6
WC	(Czech Republic) L Šafářová (Russia) V Zvonareva	5	2

=== Bottom half ===
First round
5	(France) N Dechy (Russia) D Safina	7	2	[11]
(Russia) N Petrova (Russia) E Vesnina	5	6	[9]
(Slovakia) J Husárová (Poland) A Radwańska	6	3	[10]
(Greece) D Daniilidou (Germany) J Wöhr	3	6	[4]
(China) S Peng (China) T Sun	4	5
(Russia) A Kleybanova (Russia) G Voskoboeva	6	7
6	(China) Z Yan (China) J Zheng	6	6
(Bosnia and Herzegovina) M Jugić-Salkić (Czech Republic) G Navrátilová	1	2
(France) S Foretz (Tunisia) S Sfar	4	2
(Japan) A Morita (Romania) M Niculescu	6	6
(United States) J Ditty (Czech Republic) E Hrdinová	6	7
(Switzerland) E Gagliardi (Switzerland) P Schnyder	3	6^{9}

Second round
5	(France) N Dechy (Russia) D Safina	6^{4}	2
(Slovakia) J Husárová (Poland) A Radwańska	7	6
(Russia) A Kleybanova (Russia) G Voskoboeva	4	2
3	(Czech Republic) K Peschke (Australia) R Stubbs	6	6
6	(China) Z Yan (China) J Zheng	6^{3}	6^{5}
(Japan) A Morita (Romania) M Niculescu	7	7
(United States) J Ditty (Czech Republic) E Hrdinová	4	0
2	(Slovenia) K Srebotnik (Japan) A Sugiyama	6	6

Quarterfinals
(Slovakia) J Husárová (Poland) A Radwańska	6^{6}	1
3	(Czech Republic) K Peschke (Australia) R Stubbs	7	6
(Japan) A Morita (Romania) M Niculescu	3	2
2	(Slovenia) K Srebotnik (Japan) A Sugiyama	6	6

Semifinals
3	(Czech Republic) K Peschke (Australia) R Stubbs	6	6
2	(Slovenia) K Srebotnik (Japan) A Sugiyama	2	0
