= 2001 Qatar Total Fina Elf Open =

- Date: 12–18 February
- Edition: 1st
- Category: Tier III
- Draw: 30S / 16D
- Prize money: $170,000
- Surface: Hard / outdoor
- Location: Doha, Qatar
- Venue: Khalifa International Tennis Complex

Champions

Singles
- (Switzerland) Martina Hingis

Doubles
- (France) Sandrine Testud / (Italy) Roberta Vinci
WTA Qatar Open	· 2002 →

The 2001 Qatar Total Fina Elf Open was a tennis tournament played on outdoor hard courts at the Khalifa International Tennis Complex in Doha in Qatar and was part of Tier III of the 2001 WTA Tour. The tournament was held from 12 February through 18 February 2001. First-seeded Martina Hingis won the singles title.

== Finals ==
=== Singles ===
(Switzerland) Martina Hingis defeated (France) Sandrine Testud 6–3, 6–2

- It was Hingis' 2nd title of the year and the 69th of her career.

=== Doubles ===
(France) Sandrine Testud / (Italy) Roberta Vinci defeated (Netherlands) Kristie Boogert / (Netherlands) Miriam Oremans 7–5, 7–6^{(7–4)}

- It was Testud's 1st title of the year and the 6th of her career. It was Vinci's only title of the year and the 1st of her career.
