= 2006 Qatar Ladies Open =

- Date: 27 February – 5 March
- Edition: 6th
- Category: WTA Tier II
- Draw: 28S/16D/32QS/4QD
- Prize money: USD600,000
- Surface: Hard, Outdoor
- Location: Doha, Qatar
- Venue: Khalifa International Tennis Complex

Champions

Singles
- (Russia) Nadia Petrova

Doubles
- (Slovakia) Daniela Hantuchová / (Japan) Ai Sugiyama
- Qatar Ladies Open

The 2006 Qatar Ladies Open (known as the 2006 Qatar Total Open for sponsorship reasons), was a tennis tournament played on outdoor hard courts. It was the 6th edition of the Qatar Total Open, and was part of the Tier II Series of the 2006 WTA Tour. It took place at the Khalifa International Tennis Complex in Doha, Qatar, from February 27 through March 5, 2007.

== Finals ==
=== Singles ===
(Russia) Nadia Petrova defeated (France) Amélie Mauresmo, 6–3, 7–5

- It was the 2nd singles title for Petrova in her career.

=== Doubles ===
(Slovakia) Daniela Hantuchová / (Japan) Ai Sugiyama defeated (China) Li Ting / (China) Sun Tiantian, 6–4, 6–4

- It was the 7th title for Hantuchová and the 32nd title for Sugiyama in their respective doubles careers.

== Points and prize money ==
=== Point distribution ===
Event^{1}	W	F	SF	QF	Round of 16	Round of 32	Q	Q3	Q2	Q1
Singles	195	137	88	49	25	1	11.75	6.75	4	1
Doubles	195	137	88	49	1	—N/a	11.75	—N/a	—N/a	—N/a

=== Prize money ===
Event	W	F	SF	QF	Round of 16	Round of 32^{2}	Q3	Q2	Q1
Singles	$95,500	$51,000	$27,300	$14,600	$7,820	$4,175	$2,230	$1,195	$640
Doubles *	$30,000	$16,120	$8,620	$4,610	$2,465	—N/a	—N/a	—N/a	—N/a

^{1} Points per the WTA. ^{2} Qualifiers prize money is also the Round of 32 prize money
^{*} per team

== Singles main-draw entrants ==
=== Seeds ===
Country	Player	Rank^{1}	Seed
FRA	Amélie Mauresmo	2	1
RUS	Nadia Petrova	8	2
ITA	Francesca Schiavone	11	3
RUS	Anastasia Myskina	12	4
SVK	Daniela Hantuchová	14	5
RUS	Svetlana Kuznetsova	15	6
RUS	Elena Likhovtseva	16	7
SCG	Jelena Janković	21	8

- Rankings are as of February 20, 2006.

=== Other entrants ===
The following players received wildcards into the singles main draw:

- (Switzerland) Martina Hingis
- (Tunisia) Selima Sfar

The following players received entry from the qualifying draw:

- (China) Li Ting
- (Greece) Eleni Daniilidou
- (India) Shikha Uberoi
- (United States) Neha Uberoi

== Doubles main-draw entrants ==
=== Seeds ===
Country	Player	Country	Player	Rank^{1}	Seed
RUS	Elena Likhovtseva	RUS	Vera Zvonareva	20	1
CHN	Yan Zi	CHN	Zheng Jie	28	2
SVK	Daniela Hantuchová	JPN	Ai Sugiyama	31	3
RSA	Liezel Huber	USA	Martina Navratilova	35	4

- Rankings are as of February 20, 2006.

=== Other entrants ===
The following pair received wildcards into the doubles main draw:

- (Germany) Antonia Matic / (Belarus) Tatiana Poutchek

The following pair received entry from the qualifying draw:

- (Germany) Angelika Bachmann / (Hungary) Kira Nagy

=== Withdrawals ===
During the tournament

- (Czech Republic) Květa Peschke / (Italy) Francesca Schiavone
