= 2005 Qatar Ladies Open =

- Date: 21–26 February
- Edition: 5th
- Category: WTA Tier II
- Draw: 28S/16D/32QS/4QD
- Prize money: USD585,000
- Surface: Hard, Outdoor
- Location: Doha, Qatar
- Venue: Khalifa International Tennis Complex

Champions

Singles
- (Russia) Maria Sharapova

Doubles
- (Australia) Alicia Molik / (Italy) Francesca Schiavone
- Qatar Ladies Open

The 2005 Qatar Ladies Open (known as the 2005 Qatar Total Open for sponsorship reasons), was a tennis tournament played on outdoor hard courts. It was the 5th edition of the Qatar Total Open, and was part of the Tier II Series of the 2005 WTA Tour. It took place at the Khalifa International Tennis Complex in Doha, Qatar, from 21 February until 26 February 2005. Second-seeded Maria Sharapova won the singles title.

== Finals ==
=== Singles ===
(Russia) Maria Sharapova defeated (Australia) Alicia Molik, 4–6, 6–1, 6–4

=== Doubles ===
(Australia) Alicia Molik / (Italy) Francesca Schiavone defeated (Zimbabwe) Cara Black / (South Africa) Liezel Huber, 6–3, 6–4

== Points and prize money ==
=== Point distribution ===
Event^{1}	W	F	SF	QF	Round of 16	Round of 32	Q	Q3	Q2	Q1
Singles	195	137	88	49	25	1	11.75	6.75	4	1
Doubles	195	137	88	49	1	—N/a	11.75	—N/a	—N/a	—N/a

=== Prize money ===
Event	W	F	SF	QF	Round of 16	Round of 32^{2}	Q3	Q2	Q1
Singles	$95,500	$51,000	$27,300	$14,600	$7,820	$4,175	$2,230	$1,195	$640
Doubles *	$30,000	$16,120	$8,620	$4,610	$2,465	—N/a	—N/a	—N/a	—N/a

^{1} Points per the WTA. ^{2} Qualifiers prize money is also the Round of 32 prize money
^{*} per team
