= 2003 Qatar Total Fina Elf Open – Singles =

Singles
- 2003 Qatar Total Fina Elf Open

Final
- Champion: (Russia) Anastasia Myskina
- Runner-up: (Russia) Elena Likhovtseva
- Score: 6–3, 6–1

Details
- Draw: 30
- Seeds: 8

Events
Singles	Doubles
← 2002 ·	Qatar Ladies Open	· 2004 →

Monica Seles was the defending champion, but lost in the second round to Lina Krasnoroutskaya.

Anastasia Myskina won the title, defeating Elena Likhovtseva 6–3, 6–1 in an all-Russian final.

== Singles results ==
=== Seeds ===
- The top two seeds received a bye into the second round.
1. (United States) Monica Seles (second round)
2. (Russia) Anastasia Myskina (champion)
3. (Bulgaria) Magdalena Maleeva (quarterfinals)
4. (Thailand) Tamarine Tanasugarn (first round)
5. (Russia) Elena Likhovtseva (finals)
6. (Italy) Francesca Schiavone (first round)
7. (Spain) Conchita Martínez (quarterfinals)
8. (Australia) Nicole Pratt (quarterfinals)

Key

- Q = Qualifier
- WC = Wild card
- LL = Lucky loser
- Alt = Alternate
- ITF = ITF entry
- PR = Protected ranking
- SR = Special ranking
- SE = Special exempt
- JE = Junior exempt
- JR = Junior Accelerator Programme entrant
- CO = College Accelerator Programme entrant
- NG = Next Gen Accelerator Program entrant
- w/o = Walkover
- r = Retired
- d = Defaulted

=== Finals ===
Semifinals
WC	(Russia) Lina Krasnoroutskaya	4	3
5	(Russia) Elena Likhovtseva	6	6
(Austria) Patricia Wartusch	3	3
2	(Russia) Anastasia Myskina	6	6

Final
5	(Russia) Elena Likhovtseva	3	1
2	(Russia) Anastasia Myskina	6	6

=== Top half ===
First round
Q	(China) J Zheng	3	2
WC	(Russia) L Krasnoroutskaya	6	6
(Germany) M Müller	6^{5}	6	3
Q	(United Kingdom) L Ahl	7^{7}	4	6
(Croatia) J Kostanić	2	2
7	(Spain) C Martínez	6	6
3	(Bulgaria) M Maleeva	6	6
(Paraguay) R de los Ríos	2	1
(Slovakia) M Suchá	6	6^{8}	6
(Switzerland) E Gagliardi	4	7^{10}	4
(Italy) An Serra Zanetti	3	6^{3}
(Uzbekistan) I Tulyaganova	6	7^{7}
(Zimbabwe) C Black	2	4
5	(Russia) E Likhovtseva	6	6

Second round
1	(United States) M Seles	5	5
WC	(Russia) L Krasnoroutskaya	7	7
Q	(United Kingdom) L Ahl	0	2
7	(Spain) C Martínez	6	6
3	(Bulgaria) M Maleeva	6	6
(Slovakia) M Suchá	4	2
(Uzbekistan) I Tulyaganova	1	4
5	(Russia) E Likhovtseva	6	6

Quarterfinals
WC	(Russia) L Krasnoroutskaya	7^{7}	4
7	(Spain) C Martínez	6^{5}	0^{r}
3	(Bulgaria) M Maleeva	4	2
5	(Russia) E Likhovtseva	6	6

Semifinals
WC	(Russia) L Krasnoroutskaya	4	3
5	(Russia) E Likhovtseva	6	6

=== Bottom half ===
First round
8	(Australia) N Pratt	6	2	6
Q	(China) T Sun	3	6	3
(Indonesia) A Widjaja	7^{7}	6
(Croatia) S Talaja	6^{4}	4
(Austria) P Wartusch	6	6
Q	(Spain) A Parra Santonja	3	1
WC	(Venezuela) M Vento-Kabchi	6	6
4	(Thailand) T Tanasugarn	2	2
6	(Italy) F Schiavone	2	3
(Russia) S Kuznetsova	6	6
(Russia) D Safina	6	7^{8}
(Italy) Ad Serra Zanetti	2	6^{6}
(Germany) A Barna	2	6	3
(France) M Pierce	6	2	6

Second round
8	(Australia) N Pratt	4	6	6
(Indonesia) A Widjaja	6	4	1
(Austria) P Wartusch	0	6	6
WC	(Venezuela) M Vento-Kabchi	6	3	4
(Russia) S Kuznetsova	4	3
(Russia) D Safina	6	6
(France) M Pierce	5	4
2	(Russia) A Myskina	7	6

Quarterfinals
8	(Australia) N Pratt	6	2	4
(Austria) P Wartusch	0	6	6
(Russia) D Safina	2	5
2	(Russia) A Myskina	6	7

Semifinals
(Austria) P Wartusch	3	3
2	(Russia) A Myskina	6	6

== Qualifying ==
=== Seeds ===
1. n/a
2. (Australia) Evie Dominikovic (first round)
3. (Spain) María Sánchez Lorenzo (qualifying competition)
4. (Hungary) Petra Mandula (first round)
5. n/a
6. (Indonesia) Wynne Prakusya (second round)
7. (Slovakia) Ľubomíra Kurhajcová (second round)
8. (Italy) Mara Santangelo (first round)

=== Qualifiers ===
1. (China) Zheng Jie
2. (Spain) Arantxa Parra Santonja
3. (China) Sun Tiantian
4. (United Kingdom) Lucie Ahl

=== Draw ===
==== First qualifier ====
First round
Alt	(Australia) Trudi Musgrave	3	4
(Slovakia) Eva Fislová	6	6
(China) Zheng Jie	6	6
(Chinese Taipei) Janet Lee	3	3
(Hungary) Kyra Nagy	6	6
(Tunisia) Selima Sfar	3	4
(United States) Sunitha Rao	2	2
6	(Indonesia) Wynne Prakusya	6	6

Second round
(Slovakia) Eva Fislová	6	2	3
(China) Zheng Jie	3	6	6
(Hungary) Kyra Nagy	6	1	6
6	(Indonesia) Wynne Prakusya	2	6	1

Qualifying competition
(China) Zheng Jie	6	6
(Hungary) Kyra Nagy	0	3

==== Second qualifier ====
First round
2	(Australia) Evie Dominikovic	2	4
(Spain) Arantxa Parra Santonja	6	6
(Kazakhstan) Irina Selyutina	6	6
(Poland) Joanna Sakowicz	1	2
(Russia) Galina Fokina	4	6	6
WC	(Lithuania) Aurelija Misevičiūtė	6	4	3
(Ukraine) Oleksandra Kravets	4	7	7
8	(Italy) Mara Santangelo	6	5	5

Second round
(Spain) Arantxa Parra Santonja	6	6
(Kazakhstan) Irina Selyutina	2	0
(Russia) Galina Fokina	6	0
(Ukraine) Oleksandra Kravets	3	0^{r}

Qualifying competition
(Spain) Arantxa Parra Santonja	3	6	6
(Russia) Galina Fokina	6	2	4

==== Third qualifier ====
First round
3	(Spain) María Sánchez Lorenzo	7	6
(Czech Republic) Renata Voráčová	5	2
(Germany) Adriana Barna	3	5
WC	(Portugal) Frederica Piedade	6	7
(China) Sun Tiantian	6	6
(Ukraine) Yuliana Fedak	2	1
(South Africa) Natalie Grandin	3	4
7	(Slovakia) Ľubomíra Kurhajcová	6	6

Second round
3	(Spain) María Sánchez Lorenzo	6	6
WC	(Portugal) Frederica Piedade	0	3
(China) Sun Tiantian	6	6
7	(Slovakia) Ľubomíra Kurhajcová	4	4

Qualifying competition
3	(Spain) María Sánchez Lorenzo	3	6	1
(China) Sun Tiantian	6	3	6

==== Fourth qualifier ====
First round
4	(Hungary) Petra Mandula	6	3	2
(United Kingdom) Lucie Ahl	4	6	6
WC	(India) Sania Mirza	4	6	1
(Czech Republic) Olga Blahotová	6	3	6
(Ukraine) Anna Zaporozhanova	7	6
(Spain) Gala León García	5	2
WC	(Egypt) Yomna Farid	3	1
Alt	(China) Yan Zi	6	6

Second round
(United Kingdom) Lucie Ahl	5	6	6
(Czech Republic) Olga Blahotová	7	3	1
(Ukraine) Anna Zaporozhanova	6	6
Alt	(China) Yan Zi	3	3

Qualifying competition
(United Kingdom) Lucie Ahl	6	6
(Ukraine) Anna Zaporozhanova	1	3
