= 2005 Qatar Ladies Open – Singles =

Singles
- 2005 Qatar Ladies Open

Final
- Champion: (Russia) Maria Sharapova
- Runner-up: (Australia) Alicia Molik
- Score: 4–6, 6–1, 6–4

Details
- Draw: 28
- Seeds: 8

Events
Singles	Doubles
← 2004 ·	Qatar Ladies Open	· 2006 →

Anastasia Myskina was the defending champion, but lost in round two.

Maria Sharapova won the title, defeating Alicia Molik in the final.

== Main draw ==
=== Key ===
- Q = Qualifier
- WC = Wild card
- LL = Lucky loser
- Alt = Alternate
- SE = Special exempt
- PR = Protected ranking
- ITF = ITF entry
- JE = Junior exempt
- w/o = Walkover
- r = Retired
- d = Defaulted
- SR = Special ranking

=== Seeds ===
The top four seeds received a bye into the second round.

1. (France) Amélie Mauresmo (semifinals)
2. (Russia) Maria Sharapova (champion)
3. (Russia) Anastasia Myskina (second round)
4. (Australia) Alicia Molik (finals)
5. (Switzerland) Patty Schnyder (second round)
6. (Russia) Elena Bovina (second round)
7. (Italy) Silvia Farina Elia (first round)
8. (Argentina) Paola Suárez (first round)

=== Finals ===
Semifinals
1	(France) Amélie Mauresmo	6^{11}	1
4	(Australia) Alicia Molik	7	6
(Slovakia) Daniela Hantuchová	2	4
2	(Russia) Maria Sharapova	6	6

Final
4	(Australia) Alicia Molik	6	1	4
2	(Russia) Maria Sharapova	4	6	6

=== Top half ===
First round
WC	(Serbia and Montenegro) A Ivanovic	6	6
(Venezuela) M Vento-Kabchi	1	0
Q	(Russia) M Kirilenko	6	6
Q	(Czech Republic) L Šafářová	3	1
Q	(China) N Li	5	6	5
5	(Switzerland) P Schnyder	7	3	7
WC	(Tunisia) S Sfar	5	2
(Australia) N Pratt	7	6
(Japan) A Sugiyama	6	6
LL	(Australia) S Stosur	2	3
(Italy) F Schiavone	6	6
7	(Italy) S Farina Elia	1	3

Second round
1	(France) A Mauresmo	2	6	6
WC	(Serbia and Montenegro) A Ivanovic	6	2	4
Q	(Russia) M Kirilenko	6	1	6
5	(Switzerland) P Schnyder	0	6	2
4	(Australia) A Molik	6	6
(Australia) N Pratt	3	2
(Japan) A Sugiyama	2	6	2
(Italy) F Schiavone	6	2	6

Quarterfinals
1	(France) A Mauresmo	6	6
Q	(Russia) M Kirilenko	2	2
4	(Australia) A Molik	6	3	7
(Italy) F Schiavone	2	6	6^{2}

Semifinals
1	(France) A Mauresmo	6^{11}	1
4	(Australia) A Molik	7	6

=== Bottom half ===
First round
6	(Russia) E Bovina	7	7
(Japan) S Asagoe	5	6^{6}
(Slovakia) D Hantuchová	4	6	6
(Bulgaria) M Maleeva	6	4	3
(Spain) C Martínez	5	6	6
Q	(Italy) R Vinci	7	0	2
8	(Argentina) P Suárez	1	1
(France) M Bartoli	6	6
(Italy) ME Camerin	6	5	3
(Croatia) J Kostanić	3	7	6
(Argentina) G Dulko	6	1	6
(Spain) A Medina Garrigues	1	6	4

Second round
6	(Russia) E Bovina	0	6	3
(Slovakia) D Hantuchová	6	3	6
(Spain) C Martínez	6	7
3	(Russia) A Myskina	4	5
(France) M Bartoli	7	6
(Croatia) J Kostanić	5	2
(Argentina) G Dulko	1	1
2	(Russia) M Sharapova	6	6

Quarterfinals
(Slovakia) D Hantuchová	6	6
(Spain) C Martínez	4	1
(France) M Bartoli	3	2
2	(Russia) M Sharapova	6	6

Semifinals
(Slovakia) D Hantuchová	2	4
2	(Russia) M Sharapova	6	6
