= 2007 Qatar Ladies Open – Doubles =

Doubles
- 2007 Qatar Ladies Open

Final
- Champion: (Switzerland) Martina Hingis (Russia) Maria Kirilenko
- Runner-up: (Hungary) Ágnes Szávay (Czech Republic) Vladimíra Uhlířová
- Score: 6-1, 6-1

Events
Singles	Doubles
← 2006 ·	Qatar Ladies Open	· 2008 →

Daniela Hantuchová and Ai Sugiyama were defending champions, but withdrew due to Sugiyama's right toe injury.

== Seeds ==
1. (Slovakia) Daniela Hantuchová
  (Japan) Ai Sugiyama (withdrew due to Sugiyama's right toe injury)
2. (Germany) Anna-Lena Grönefeld
  (United States) Meghann Shaughnessy (semifinals)
3. (Slovakia) Janette Husárová
  (Czech Republic) Květa Peschke (quarterfinals)
4. (Spain) Anabel Medina Garrigues
  (India) Sania Mirza (withdrew due to Mirza's right knee injury)

== Draw ==
=== Key ===
- Q = Qualifier
- WC = Wild card
- LL = Lucky loser
- Alt = Alternate
- SE = Special exempt
- PR = Protected ranking
- ITF = ITF entry
- JE = Junior exempt
- w/o = Walkover
- r = Retired
- d = Defaulted
- SR = Special ranking

=== Draw ===
First round
Alt	(Colombia) C Castaño (Germany) V Henke	6	6
(Russia) V Dushevina (Italy) M Santangelo	3	0
(Italy) ME Camerin (Slovenia) A Klepač	3	2
(Hungary) Á Szávay (Czech Republic) V Uhlířova	6	6
Alt	(Russia) E Ivanova (Argentina) ME Salerni	6^{5}	7	2
(Russia) S Kuznetsova (Australia) A Molik	7^{7}	5	6
(Croatia) J Kostanić Tošić (Ukraine) T Perebiynis	6	6
(France) S Cohen-Aloro (Tunisia) S Sfar	3	2
WC	(Switzerland) M Hingis (Russia) M Kirilenko	6	6
(Greece) E Daniilidou (Germany) J Wöhr	4	3
WC	(United States) N Uberoi (India) S Uberoi	2	2
3	(Slovakia) J Husárová (Czech Republic) K Peschke	6	6
(Ukraine) A Bondarenko (Ukraine) K Bondarenko	6	6
(Switzerland) E Gagliardi (Ukraine) M Koryttseva	4	1
(Romania) A Ehritt-Vanc (Russia) A Rodionova	2	6	1
2	(Germany) A-L Grönefeld (United States) M Shaughnessy	6	4	6

Quarterfinals
Alt	(Colombia) C Castaño (Germany) V Henke
(Hungary) Á Szávay (Czech Republic) V Uhlířova	w/o
(Russia) S Kuznetsova (Australia) A Molik	4	6	5
(Croatia) J Kostanić Tošić (Ukraine) T Perebiynis	6	4	7
WC	(Switzerland) M Hingis (Russia) M Kirilenko	6	7^{7}
3	(Slovakia) J Husárová (Czech Republic) K Peschke	3	6^{5}
(Ukraine) A Bondarenko (Ukraine) K Bondarenko	2	6	4
2	(Germany) A-L Grönefeld (United States) M Shaughnessy	6	2	6

Semifinals
(Hungary) Á Szávay (Czech Republic) V Uhlířova	6	3	6
(Croatia) J Kostanić Tošić (Ukraine) T Perebiynis	2	6	3
WC	(Switzerland) M Hingis (Russia) M Kirilenko	6	6
2	(Germany) A-L Grönefeld (United States) M Shaughnessy	2	0

Final
(Hungary) Á Szávay (Czech Republic) V Uhlířova	1	1
WC	(Switzerland) M Hingis (Russia) M Kirilenko	6	6
