= 2021 Qatar Total Open – Singles =

Singles
- 2021 Qatar Total Open

Final
- Champion: (Czech Republic) Petra Kvitová
- Runner-up: (Spain) Garbiñe Muguruza
- Score: 6–2, 6–1

Details
- Draw: 28
- Seeds: 8

Events
Singles	Doubles
← 2020 ·	Qatar Total Open	· 2022 →

Petra Kvitová defeated Garbiñe Muguruza in the final, 6–2, 6–1 to win the singles tennis title at the 2021 WTA Qatar Open. The final was a rematch of the 2018 final. It was Kvitová's second title at the WTA Qatar Open. Kvitová dropped just one set the entire tournament, to Anett Kontaveit in the quarterfinals.

Aryna Sabalenka was the defending champion, but lost in the second round to Muguruza.

== Seeds ==
The top four seeds received a bye into the second round.

1. (Ukraine) Elina Svitolina (quarterfinals)
2. (Czech Republic) Karolína Plíšková (quarterfinals)
3. (Belarus) Aryna Sabalenka (second round)
4. (Czech Republic) Petra Kvitová (champion)
5. (Netherlands) Kiki Bertens (first round)
6. (Switzerland) Belinda Bencic (first round)
7. (United States) Jennifer Brady (first round)
8. (Belarus) Victoria Azarenka (semifinals, withdrew)

== Draw ==
=== Key ===
- Q = Qualifier
- WC = Wild card
- LL = Lucky loser
- Alt = Alternate
- SE = Special exempt
- PR = Protected ranking
- ITF = ITF entry
- JE = Junior exempt
- w/o = Walkover
- r = Retired
- d = Defaulted
- SR = Special ranking

=== Finals ===
Semifinals
8/WC	(Belarus) Victoria Azarenka
(Spain) Garbiñe Muguruza	w/o
4	(Czech Republic) Petra Kvitová	6	6
Q	(United States) Jessica Pegula	4	4

Final
(Spain) Garbiñe Muguruza	2	1
4	(Czech Republic) Petra Kvitová	6	6

=== Top half ===
First round
PR	(China) S Zheng	4	3
LL	(Japan) M Doi	6	6
(Kazakhstan) E Rybakina	6^{7}	6^{5}
Q	(Germany) L Siegemund	7^{9}	7^{7}
(Russia) S Kuznetsova	2	3
8/WC	(Belarus) V Azarenka	6	6
(Russia) V Kudermetova	2	6^{4}
(Spain) G Muguruza	6	7^{7}
(Greece) M Sakkari	6	6
WC	(Egypt) M Sherif	0	3
(United States) M Keys	6	6
6	(Switzerland) B Bencic	4	1

Second round
1	(Ukraine) E Svitolina	6	6
LL	(Japan) M Doi	1	2
Q	(Germany) L Siegemund	4	2
8/WC	(Belarus) V Azarenka	6	6
3	(Belarus) A Sabalenka	2	7^{7}	3
(Spain) G Muguruza	6	6^{5}	6
(Greece) M Sakkari	6	6
(United States) M Keys	2	2

Quarterfinals
1	(Ukraine) E Svitolina	2	4
8/WC	(Belarus) V Azarenka	6	6
(Spain) G Muguruza	6	6
(Greece) M Sakkari	3	1

Semifinals
8/WC	(Belarus) V Azarenka
(Spain) G Muguruza	w/o

=== Bottom half ===
First round
7	(United States) J Brady	1	2
(Estonia) A Kontaveit	6	6
(Germany) A Kerber	6	6
WC	(Turkey) Ç Büyükakçay	4	2
Q	(Czech Republic) Kr Plíšková	2	3
(Russia) A Pavlyuchenkova	6	6
5	(Netherlands) K Bertens	0	2
WC	(Latvia) J Ostapenko	6	6
(China) Q Wang	3	1
Q	(United States) J Pegula	6	6
(Tunisia) O Jabeur	6	6
Q	(Russia) A Blinkova	2	2

Second round
(Estonia) A Kontaveit	6	6
(Germany) A Kerber	1	4
(Russia) A Pavlyuchenkova	1	3
4	(Czech Republic) P Kvitová	6	6
WC	(Latvia) J Ostapenko	2	5
Q	(United States) J Pegula	6	7
(Tunisia) O Jabeur	4	6	5
2	(Czech Republic) Ka Plíšková	6	4	7

Quarterfinals
(Estonia) A Kontaveit	3	6	2
4	(Czech Republic) P Kvitová	6	3	6
Q	(United States) J Pegula	6	6
2	(Czech Republic) Ka Plíšková	3	1

Semifinals
4	(Czech Republic) P Kvitová	6	6
Q	(United States) J Pegula	4	4

== Qualifying ==
=== Seeds ===
1. (United States) Jessica Pegula (qualified)
2. (Germany) Laura Siegemund (qualified)
3. (Romania) Patricia Maria Țig (first round)
4. (Czech Republic) Barbora Krejčíková (second round)
5. (Czech Republic) Kateřina Siniaková (second round)
6. (Russia) Anna Blinkova (qualified)
7. (Czech Republic) Kristýna Plíšková (qualified)
8. (Japan) Misaki Doi (qualifying competition, lucky loser)

=== Qualifiers ===
1. (United States) Jessica Pegula
2. (Germany) Laura Siegemund
3. (Russia) Anna Blinkova
4. (Czech Republic) Kristýna Plíšková

=== Lucky loser ===
1. (Japan) Misaki Doi

=== Draw ===
==== First qualifier ====
First round
1	(United States) Jessica Pegula	6	6
(Canada) Gabriela Dabrowski	0	1
PR	(Chinese Taipei) Liang En-shuo	2	4
PR	(Russia) Anastasia Potapova	6	6
(Sweden) Mirjam Björklund	6	6
(Czech Republic) Lucie Hradecká	2	4
(Russia) Angelina Gabueva	1	0
8	(Japan) Misaki Doi	6	6

Second round
1	(United States) Jessica Pegula	6	6^{3}	7^{8}
PR	(Russia) Anastasia Potapova	2	7^{7}	6^{6}
(Sweden) Mirjam Björklund	6	1	1
8	(Japan) Misaki Doi	3	6	6

Qualifying competition
1	(United States) Jessica Pegula	6	6
8	(Japan) Misaki Doi	2	2

==== Second qualifier ====
First round
2	(Germany) Laura Siegemund	6	6
(Slovenia) Andreja Klepač	4	0
WC	(Algeria) Inès Ibbou	5	3
(Romania) Elena-Gabriela Ruse	7	6
(Ukraine) Lesia Tsurenko	6	6
(Brazil) Gabriela Cé	1	1
(Romania) Monica Niculescu	2	6	0
5	(Czech Republic) Kateřina Siniaková	6	4	6

Second round
2	(Germany) Laura Siegemund	6	6
(Romania) Elena-Gabriela Ruse	2	2
(Ukraine) Lesia Tsurenko	6	6
5	(Czech Republic) Kateřina Siniaková	3	2

Qualifying competition
2	(Germany) Laura Siegemund	7^{7}	6
(Ukraine) Lesia Tsurenko	6^{4}	4

==== Third qualifier ====
First round
3	(Romania) Patricia Maria Țig	3	2
(United States) Bethanie Mattek-Sands	6	6
PR	(Kazakhstan) Yaroslava Shvedova	6	6
PR	(Uzbekistan) Akgul Amanmuradova	3	0
WC	(Qatar) Mubaraka Al-Naimi	0	1
(Japan) Ena Shibahara	6	6
(Netherlands) Lesley Pattinama Kerkhove	3	6^{3}
6	(Russia) Anna Blinkova	6	7^{7}

Second round
(United States) Bethanie Mattek-Sands	6	7
PR	(Kazakhstan) Yaroslava Shvedova	2	5
(Japan) Ena Shibahara	4	6	2
6	(Russia) Anna Blinkova	6	3	6

Qualifying competition
(United States) Bethanie Mattek-Sands	2	3
6	(Russia) Anna Blinkova	6	6

==== Fourth qualifier ====
First round
4	(Czech Republic) Barbora Krejčíková	7	6
(Italy) Martina Trevisan	5	4
(Spain) Cristina Bucșa	6	6
(Italy) Martina Caregaro	1	2
PR	(China) Zhu Lin	7	5	6
(Czech Republic) Jesika Malečková	5	7	4
(Croatia) Darija Jurak	4	2
7	(Czech Republic) Kristýna Plíšková	6	6

Second round
4	(Czech Republic) Barbora Krejčíková	3	5
(Spain) Cristina Bucșa	6	7
PR	(China) Zhu Lin	2	1
7	(Czech Republic) Kristýna Plíšková	6	6

Qualifying competition
(Spain) Cristina Bucșa	2	2
7	(Czech Republic) Kristýna Plíšková	6	6
