= 2004 Qatar Ladies Open =

- Date: 1–7 March
- Edition: 4th
- Category: WTA Tier II
- Draw: 28S / 16D
- Prize money: USD 600,000
- Surface: Hard, outdoor
- Location: Doha, Qatar
- Venue: Khalifa International Tennis Complex

Champions

Singles
- (Russia) Anastasia Myskina

Doubles
- (Russia) Svetlana Kuznetsova / (Russia) Elena Likhovtseva
- Qatar Ladies Open

The 2004 Qatar Ladies Open (known as the 2004 Qatar Total Open for sponsorship reasons), was a women's tennis tournament played on outdoor hard courts. It was the 4th edition of the Qatar Total Open, and was part of the Tier II Series of the 2004 WTA Tour. It took place at the Khalifa International Tennis Complex in Doha, Qatar from 1 March until 7 March 2004. Third-seeded Anastasia Myskina won the singles title.

== Finals ==
=== Singles ===
(Russia) Anastasia Myskina defeated (Russia) Svetlana Kuznetsova, 4–6, 6–4, 6–4

=== Doubles ===
(Russia) Svetlana Kuznetsova / (Russia) Elena Likhovtseva defeated (Slovakia) Janette Husárová / (Spain) Conchita Martínez, 7–6^{(7–4)}, 6–2

== Points and prize money ==
=== Point distribution ===
| Event^{1} | W | F | SF | QF | Round of 16 | Round of 32 | Q | Q3 | Q2 | Q1 |
| Singles | 195 | 137 | 88 | 49 | 25 | 1 | 11.75 | 6.75 | 4 | 1 |
| Doubles | 195 | 137 | 88 | 49 | 1 | —N/a | 11.75 | —N/a | —N/a | —N/a |
