= 2001 Qatar Total Fina Elf Open – Singles =

Singles
- 2001 Qatar Total Fina Elf Open

Final
- Champion: (Switzerland) Martina Hingis
- Runner-up: (France) Sandrine Testud
- Score: 6–3, 6–2

Details
- Draw: 30
- Seeds: 8

Events
Singles	Doubles
Qatar Ladies Open	· 2002 →

2001 Qatar Total Fina Elf Open was a WTA tier III tennis tournament held in Doha, Qatar from 12 – 18 February 2001. Martina Hingis won in the final 6–3, 6–2 against Sandrine Testud.

== Seeds ==
A champion seed is indicated in bold text while text in italics indicates the round in which that seed was eliminated. The top two seeds received a bye to the second round.

1. (Switzerland) **Martina Hingis (champion)**
2. (France) Mary Pierce (second round)
3. (France) Sandrine Testud (final)
4. (Austria) Barbara Schett (semifinals)
5. (Thailand) Tamarine Tanasugarn (second round)
6. (Croatia) Iva Majoli (withdrew)
7. (Italy) Rita Grande (first round)
8. (South Africa) Joannette Kruger (quarterfinals)

== Draw ==
Key

- Q = Qualifier
- WC = Wild card
- LL = Lucky loser
- Alt = Alternate
- ITF = ITF entry
- PR = Protected ranking
- SR = Special ranking
- SE = Special exempt
- JE = Junior exempt
- JR = Junior Accelerator Programme entrant
- CO = College Accelerator Programme entrant
- NG = Next Gen Accelerator Program entrant
- w/o = Walkover
- r = Retired
- d = Defaulted

=== Final ===
Final
1	(Switzerland) **Martina Hingis**	**6**	**6**
3	(France) Sandrine Testud	3	2

=== Section 1 ===
First round
WC	(Venezuela) **M Vento**	**7^{7}**	6^{2}	**6**
(Germany) B Rittner	6^{5}	**7^{7}**	3
(Paraguay) R de los Ríos	2	4
Q	(Australia) **A Ellwood**	**6**	**6**
(Spain) C Torrens Valero	6^{6}	**6**	6^{2}
8	(South Africa) **J Kruger**	**7^{8}**	4	**7^{7}**
4	(Austria) **B Schett**	**6**	**6**
(Belarus) N Ostrovskaya	1	3
(Uzbekistan) **I Tulyaganova**	**6**	**7^{7}**
(Belarus) O Barabanschikova	3	6^{3}
(Belarus) **T Poutchek**	**6**	**6**
LL	(Australia) A Molik	2	2
Q	(Russia) **L Krasnoroutskaya**	**6**	**7^{7}**
7	(Italy) R Grande	4	6^{3}

Second round
1	(Switzerland) **M Hingis**	**7^{7}**	**6**
WC	(Venezuela) M Vento	6^{4}	1
Q	(Australia) A Ellwood	3	**6**	2
8	(South Africa) **J Kruger**	**6**	3	**6**
4	(Austria) **B Schett**	6^{1}	**6**	**6**
(Uzbekistan) I Tulyaganova	**7^{7}**	2	1
(Belarus) T Poutchek	**6**	5	6^{5}
Q	(Russia) **L Krasnoroutskaya**	2	**7**	**7^{7}**

Quarterfinals
1	(Switzerland) **M Hingis**	**6**	**6**
8	(South Africa) J Kruger	4	2
4	(Austria) **B Schett**	**6**	**6**
Q	(Russia) L Krasnoroutskaya	3	4

Semifinals
1	(Switzerland) **M Hingis**	**6**	**6**
4	(Austria) B Schett	1	2

=== Section 2 ===
First round
Q	(Slovakia) **H Nagyová**	**6**	**6**
(Spain) M Sánchez Lorenzo	1	2
(Germany) **M Weingärtner**	**6**	4	**6**
(United States) H Parkinson	0	**6**	1
(Bulgaria) L Bacheva	4	4
WC	(Tunisia) **S Sfar**	**6**	**6**
(Netherlands) M Oremans	5	1
3	(France) **S Testud**	**7**	**6**
5	(Thailand) **T Tanasugarn**	**6**	**6**
(Bulgaria) P Nola	2	3
(Federal Republic of Yugoslavia) S Načuk	2	4
(Netherlands) **K Boogert**	**6**	**6**
(Czech Republic) **A Gerši**	**6**	**6**
Q	(South Africa) L Horn	1	4

Second round
Q	(Slovakia) **H Nagyová**	**6**	**6**
(Germany) M Weingärtner	3	3
WC	(Tunisia) S Sfar	3	4
3	(France) **S Testud**	**6**	**6**
5	(Thailand) T Tanasugarn	**6**	4	3
(Netherlands) **K Boogert**	4	**6**	**6**
(Czech Republic) **A Gerši**	**6**	5	**6**
2	(France) M Pierce	4	**7**	0

Quarterfinals
Q	(Slovakia) H Nagyová	3	r
3	(France) **S Testud**	**6**
(Netherlands) K Boogert	1	**6**	4
(Czech Republic) **A Gerši**	**6**	3	**6**

Semifinals
3	(France) **S Testud**	**6**	**6**
(Czech Republic) A Gerši	1	1
