= 2001 Qatar Total Fina Elf Open – Doubles =

Doubles
- 2001 Qatar Total Fina Elf Open

Final
- Champions: (France) Sandrine Testud (Italy) Roberta Vinci
- Runners-up: (Netherlands) Kristie Boogert (Netherlands) Miriam Oremans
- Score: 7–5, 7–6^{(7–4)}

Details
- Draw: 16
- Seeds: 4

Events
Singles	Doubles
← 2000 ·	WTA Qatar Open	· 2002 →

Sandrine Testud and Roberta Vinci won in the final 7–5, 7–6^{(7–4)} against Kristie Boogert and Miriam Oremans.

== Seeds ==
Champion seeds are indicated in bold text while text in italics indicates the round in which those seeds were eliminated.

1. (France) Alexandra Fusai / (Italy) Rita Grande (first round)
2. (Netherlands) Kristie Boogert / (Netherlands) Miriam Oremans (final)
3. (South Africa) Nannie de Villiers / (Australia) Annabel Ellwood (quarterfinals)
4. (South Africa) Liezel Horn / (Venezuela) Maria Vento (quarterfinals)

== Draw ==
Key

- Q = Qualifier
- WC = Wild card
- LL = Lucky loser
- Alt = Alternate
- ITF = ITF entry
- PR = Protected ranking
- SR = Special ranking
- SE = Special exempt
- JE = Junior exempt
- JR = Junior Accelerator Programme entrant
- CO = College Accelerator Programme entrant
- NG = Next Gen Accelerator Program entrant
- w/o = Walkover
- r = Retired
- d = Defaulted

First round
1	(France) A Fusai (Italy) R Grande	6^{4}	6^{2}
(France) **S Testud** (Italy) **R Vinci**	**7^{7}**	**7^{7}**
WC	(Morocco) B Mouhtassine (Tunisia) S Sfar	1	4
(South Africa) **K Grant** (Germany) **M Weingärtner**	**6**	**6**
4	(South Africa) **L Horn** (Venezuela) **M Vento**	**6**	2	**6**
(Russia) L Krasnoroutskaya (Belarus) T Poutchek	2	**6**	3
(Federal Republic of Yugoslavia) S Načuk (India) N Vaidyanathan	2	0
(Slovakia) **H Nagyová** (Germany) **B Rittner**	**6**	**6**
(Indonesia) **Y Basuki** (Netherlands) **C Vis**	**6**	**7**
(South Africa) J Kruger (Austria) M Maruska	1	5
(Belarus) N Ostrovskaya (Germany) S Schmidle	6^{4}	4
3	(South Africa) **N de Villiers** (Australia) **A Ellwood**	**7^{7}**	**6**
(Spain) M Sánchez Lorenzo (Germany) C Schneider	3	2
Q	(Paraguay) **R de los Ríos** (Hong Kong) **K-p Tong**	**6**	**6**
(Australia) A Molik (United States) H Parkinson	5	2
2	(Netherlands) **K Boogert** (Netherlands) **M Oremans**	**7**	**6**

Quarterfinals
(France) **S Testud** (Italy) **R Vinci**	**6**	6^{5}	**7^{7}**
(South Africa) K Grant (Germany) M Weingärtner	2	**7^{7}**	6^{3}
4	(South Africa) L Horn (Venezuela) M Vento	4	6^{8}
(Slovakia) **H Nagyová** (Germany) **B Rittner**	**6**	**7^{10}**
(Indonesia) **Y Basuki** (Netherlands) **C Vis**	**6**	**6**
3	(South Africa) N de Villiers (Australia) A Ellwood	2	1
Q	(Paraguay) R de los Ríos (Hong Kong) K-p Tong	2	**6**	3
2	(Netherlands) **K Boogert** (Netherlands) **M Oremans**	**6**	4	**6**

Semifinals
(France) **S Testud** (Italy) **R Vinci**	**w/o**
(Slovakia) H Nagyová (Germany) B Rittner
(Indonesia) Y Basuki (Netherlands) C Vis	0	**6**	4
2	(Netherlands) **K Boogert** (Netherlands) **M Oremans**	**6**	4	**6**

Final
(France) **Sandrine Testud** (Italy) **Roberta Vinci**	**7**	**7^{7}**
2	(Netherlands) Kristie Boogert (Netherlands) Miriam Oremans	5	6^{4}
