= 2006 Qatar Ladies Open – Doubles =

Doubles
- 2006 Qatar Ladies Open

Final
- Champions: (Slovakia) Daniela Hantuchová (Japan) Ai Sugiyama
- Runners-up: (China) Li Ting (China) Sun Tiantian
- Score: 6–4, 6–4

Events
Singles	Doubles
← 2005 ·	Qatar Ladies Open	· 2007 →

Alicia Molik and Francesca Schiavone were the defending champions, but Molik did not compete this year. Schiavone teamed up with Květa Peschke and lost in the quarterfinals to Elena Likhovtseva and Vera Zvonareva.

Daniela Hantuchová and Ai Sugiyama won the title by defeating Li Ting and Sun Tiantian 6–4, 6–4 in the final.

== Seeds ==
1. (Russia) Elena Likhovtseva / (Russia) Vera Zvonareva (semifinals)
2. (China) Yan Zi / (China) Zheng Jie (semifinals)
3. (Slovakia) Daniela Hantuchová / (Japan) Ai Sugiyama (champions)
4. (South Africa) Liezel Huber / (United States) Martina Navratilova (first round)

== Draw ==
=== Key ===
- Q = Qualifier
- WC = Wild card
- LL = Lucky loser
- Alt = Alternate
- SE = Special exempt
- PR = Protected ranking
- ITF = ITF entry
- JE = Junior exempt
- w/o = Walkover
- r = Retired
- d = Defaulted
- SR = Special ranking

=== Draw ===
First round
1	(Russia) E Likhovtseva (Russia) V Zvonareva	7	6
(Slovenia) T Križan (Romania) A Vanc	5	2
(Czech Republic) K Peschke (Italy) F Schiavone	6	6
(United States) N Uberoi (India) S Uberoi	2	1
4	(South Africa) L Huber (United States) M Navratilova	7	3	5
(Greece) E Daniilidou (Spain) A Medina Garrigues	5	6	7
Q	(Germany) A Bachmann (Hungary) K Nagy	1	3
PR	(China) T Li (China) T Sun	6	6
(Serbia and Montenegro) J Janković (Tunisia) S Sfar	7^{7}	6
(Ukraine) A Bondarenko (Ukraine) K Bondarenko	6^{5}	1
(Germany) J Schruff (Italy) R Vinci	2	3
3	(Slovakia) D Hantuchová (Japan) A Sugiyama	6	6
WC	(Germany) A Matic (Belarus) T Poutchek	1	1
(Russia) V Dushevina (Venezuela) M Vento-Kabchi	6	6
(Russia) M Kirilenko (Russia) A Myskina	2	2
2	(China) Z Yan (China) J Zheng	6	6

Quarterfinals
1	(Russia) E Likhovtseva (Russia) V Zvonareva	w	/	o
(Czech Republic) K Peschke (Italy) F Schiavone
(Greece) E Daniilidou (Spain) A Medina Garrigues	6^{5}	4
PR	(China) T Li (China) T Sun	7^{7}	6
(Serbia and Montenegro) J Janković (Tunisia) S Sfar	6	2	0
3	(Slovakia) D Hantuchová (Japan) A Sugiyama	3	6	6
(Russia) V Dushevina (Venezuela) M Vento-Kabchi	5	3
2	(China) Z Yan (China) J Zheng	7	6

Semifinals
1	(Russia) E Likhovtseva (Russia) V Zvonareva	3	4
PR	(China) T Li (China) T Sun	6	6
3	(Slovakia) D Hantuchová (Japan) A Sugiyama	6	3	6
2	(China) Z Yan (China) J Zheng	3	6	3

Final
PR	(China) T Li (China) T Sun	4	4
3	(Slovakia) D Hantuchová (Japan) A Sugiyama	6	6

== Qualifying ==
Displayed below is the qualifying draw of the 2006 Qatar Ladies Open Doubles.

=== Seeds ===
1. (Belarus) Ekaterina Dzehalevich / (Russia) Ekaterina Makarova (qualifying competition)
2. (Germany) Angelika Bachmann / (Hungary) Kira Nagy (qualified)

=== Qualifiers ===
1. (Germany) Angelika Bachmann / (Hungary) Kira Nagy

=== Qualifying draw ===
First round
1	(Belarus) Ekaterina Dzehalevich (Russia) Ekaterina Makarova	8
WC	(Kuwait) Manar Al Jazzaf (Croatia) Martina Gregoric	0
(Luxembourg) Anne Kremer (Germany) Caroline Schneider	7
2	(Germany) Angelika Bachmann (Hungary) Kira Nagy	9

Qualifying competition
1	(Belarus) Ekaterina Dzehalevich (Russia) Ekaterina Makarova	6	2	5
2	(Germany) Angelika Bachmann (Hungary) Kira Nagy	1	6	7
