= 2021 Qatar Total Open – Doubles =

Doubles
- 2021 Qatar Total Open

Final
- Champions: (United States) Nicole Melichar (Netherlands) Demi Schuurs
- Runners-up: (Romania) Monica Niculescu (Latvia) Jeļena Ostapenko
- Score: 6–2, 2–6, [10–8]

Events
Singles	Doubles
← 2020 ·	Qatar Total Open	· 2022 →

Hsieh Su-wei and Barbora Strýcová were the defending champions but chose not to participate.

Nicole Melichar and Demi Schuurs won the title, defeating Monica Niculescu and Jeļena Ostapenko in the final, 6–2, 2–6, [10–8].

== Seeds ==
1. (Czech Republic) Barbora Krejčíková / (Czech Republic) Kateřina Siniaková (semifinals)
2. (United States) Nicole Melichar / (Netherlands) Demi Schuurs (champions)
3. (Japan) Shuko Aoyama / (Japan) Ena Shibahara (first round)
4. (Russia) Anna Blinkova / (Canada) Gabriela Dabrowski (quarterfinals)

== Draw ==
=== Key ===
- Q = Qualifier
- WC = Wild card
- LL = Lucky loser
- Alt = Alternate
- SE = Special exempt
- PR = Protected ranking
- ITF = ITF entry
- JE = Junior exempt
- w/o = Walkover
- r = Retired
- d = Defaulted
- SR = Special ranking

=== Draw ===
First round
1	(Czech Republic) B Krejčíková (Czech Republic) K Siniaková	5	6	[10]
(China) S Zheng (China) L Zhu	7	3	[3]
(Netherlands) K Bertens (Netherlands) L Pattinama Kerkhove	6	6
WC	(Turkey) Ç Büyükakçay (Russia) A Pavlyuchenkova	2	3
3	(Japan) S Aoyama (Japan) E Shibahara	4	2
(Romania) M Niculescu (Latvia) J Ostapenko	6	6
WC	(Germany) L Siegemund (Russia) E Vesnina	4	7	[10]
(Belarus) V Azarenka (Ukraine) E Svitolina	6	5	[8]
PR	(Slovenia) A Klepač (India) S Mirza	6	6^{5}	[10]
(Ukraine) L Kichenok (Ukraine) N Kichenok	4	7^{7}	[5]
(Czech Republic) L Hradecká (Czech Republic) Kr Plíšková	7	4	[9]
4	(Russia) A Blinkova (Canada) G Dabrowski	5	6	[11]
(United States) B Mattek-Sands (United States) J Pegula	6	6
Alt	(Uzbekistan) A Amanmuradova (Chinese Taipei) E-s Liang	1	3
(Chile) A Guarachi (Croatia) D Jurak	2	3
2	(United States) N Melichar (Netherlands) D Schuurs	6	6

Quarterfinals
1	(Czech Republic) B Krejčíková (Czech Republic) K Siniaková	4	6	[13]
(Netherlands) K Bertens (Netherlands) L Pattinama Kerkhove	6	4	[11]
(Romania) M Niculescu (Latvia) J Ostapenko	6	6
WC	(Germany) L Siegemund (Russia) E Vesnina	3	4
PR	(Slovenia) A Klepač (India) S Mirza	6	6
4	(Russia) A Blinkova (Canada) G Dabrowski	2	0
(United States) B Mattek-Sands (United States) J Pegula	1	1
2	(United States) N Melichar (Netherlands) D Schuurs	6	6

Semifinals
1	(Czech Republic) B Krejčíková (Czech Republic) K Siniaková	6	3	[8]
(Romania) M Niculescu (Latvia) J Ostapenko	2	6	[10]
PR	(Slovenia) A Klepač (India) S Mirza	5	6	[5]
2	(United States) N Melichar (Netherlands) D Schuurs	7	2	[10]

Final
(Romania) M Niculescu (Latvia) J Ostapenko	2	6	[8]
2	(United States) N Melichar (Netherlands) D Schuurs	6	2	[10]
