= 2006 Qatar Ladies Open – Singles =

Singles
- 2006 Qatar Ladies Open

Final
- Champion: (Russia) Nadia Petrova
- Runner-up: (France) Amélie Mauresmo
- Score: 6–3, 7–5

Details
- Draw: 28
- Seeds: 8

Events
Singles	Doubles
← 2005 ·	Qatar Ladies Open	· 2007 →

Maria Sharapova was the defending champion, but chose not to compete.
Nadia Petrova won the title, defeating Amélie Mauresmo 6–3, 7–5 in the final.

== Main draw ==
=== Key ===
- Q = Qualifier
- WC = Wild card
- LL = Lucky loser
- Alt = Alternate
- SE = Special exempt
- PR = Protected ranking
- ITF = ITF entry
- JE = Junior exempt
- w/o = Walkover
- r = Retired
- d = Defaulted
- SR = Special ranking

=== Seeds ===
The top four seeds received a bye into the second round.

1. (France) Amélie Mauresmo (final)
2. (Russia) Nadia Petrova (champion)
3. (Italy) Francesca Schiavone (second round)
4. (Russia) Anastasia Myskina (second round)
5. (Slovakia) Daniela Hantuchová (second round)
6. (Russia) Svetlana Kuznetsova (quarterfinals)
7. (Russia) Elena Likhovtseva (first round)
8. (Serbia and Montenegro) Jelena Janković (first round)

=== Finals ===
Semifinals
1	(France) Amélie Mauresmo	6	6
WC	(Switzerland) Martina Hingis	2	2
(Japan) Ai Sugiyama	1	6^{2}
2	(Russia) Nadia Petrova	6	7

Final
1	(France) Amélie Mauresmo	3	5
2	(Russia) Nadia Petrova	6	7

=== Top half ===
First round
Q	(United States) N Uberoi	0	6^{5}
(France) M Bartoli	6	7
Q	(India) S Uberoi	0	1
(Venezuela) M Vento-Kabchi	6	6
(Italy) R Vinci	6	6
7	(Russia) E Likhovtseva	4	4
WC	(Switzerland) M Hingis	6	6
(United States) M Washington	1	2
(Russia) M Kirilenko	6	6
Q	(China) T Li	2	4
(China) J Zheng	0	1
6	(Russia) S Kuznetsova	6	6

Second round
1	(France) A Mauresmo	6	6
(France) M Bartoli	0	2
(Venezuela) M Vento-Kabchi	2	3
(Italy) R Vinci	6	6
3	(Italy) F Schiavone	1	2
WC	(Switzerland) M Hingis	6	6
(Russia) M Kirilenko	6	3	2
6	(Russia) S Kuznetsova	4	6	6

Quarterfinals
1	(France) A Mauresmo	6	6
(Italy) R Vinci	4	0
WC	(Switzerland) M Hingis	7	6
6	(Russia) S Kuznetsova	6^{7}	2

Semifinals
1	(France) A Mauresmo	6	6
WC	(Switzerland) M Hingis	2	2

=== Bottom half ===
First round
8	(Serbia and Montenegro) J Janković	2	5
(Germany) J Schruff	6	7
(Ukraine) A Bondarenko	7	6
(Russia) V Dushevina	6^{1}	1
(Japan) A Sugiyama	6	6
WC	(Tunisia) S Sfar	3	3
5	(Slovakia) D Hantuchová	7	5	6
(Czech Republic) K Peschke	6^{4}	7	1
(Russia) V Zvonareva	4	4
(China) N Li	6	6
Q	(Greece) E Daniilidou	6	6
(Spain) A Medina Garrigues	4	3

Second round
(Germany) J Schruff	6	6
(Ukraine) A Bondarenko	3	3
(Japan) A Sugiyama	7	6^{6}	6
4	(Russia) A Myskina	6^{2}	7	4
5	(Slovakia) D Hantuchová	6	6^{5}	1
(China) N Li	4	7	6
Q	(Greece) E Daniilidou	1	2
2	(Russia) N Petrova	6	6

Quarterfinals
(Germany) J Schruff	3	2
(Japan) A Sugiyama	6	6
(China) N Li	4	4
2	(Russia) N Petrova	6	6

Semifinals
(Japan) A Sugiyama	1	6^{2}
2	(Russia) N Petrova	6	7

== Qualifying draw ==
Displayed below is the qualifying draw of the 2006 Qatar Ladies Open Singles.

=== Seeds ===
1. (China) Yan Zi (second round)
2. (Greece) Eleni Daniilidou (qualified)
3. n/a
4. (China) Sun Tiantian (second round)
5. (Belarus) Tatiana Poutchek (qualifying competition)
6. (Ukraine) Kateryna Bondarenko (qualifying competition)
7. (Luxembourg) Anne Kremer (second round)
8. (Hungary) Kyra Nagy (qualifying competition)
9. (India) Shikha Uberoi (qualified)

=== Qualifiers ===
1. (China) Li Ting
2. (Greece) Eleni Daniilidou
3. (India) Shikha Uberoi
4. (United States) Neha Uberoi

=== Results ===
==== First qualifier ====
First round
(China) Li Ting	6	6
WC	(Kuwait) Manar Al Jazzaf	2	0
(India) Isha Lakhani	3	4
(Hungary) Tina Križan	6	6
WC	(Croatia) Martina Gregoric	0	1
5	(Belarus) Tatiana Poutchek	6	6

Second round
1	(China) Yan Zi	1	3
(China) Li Ting	6	6
(Slovenia) Tina Križan	2	2
5	(Belarus) Tatiana Poutchek	6	6

Qualifying competition
(China) Li Ting	6	6
5	(Belarus) Tatiana Poutchek	3	1

==== Second qualifier ====
First round					Second round					Qualifying competition
					2	(Greece) Eleni Daniilidou	4	6	6
	(Russia) Ekaterina Makarova	6	1	1	WC	(Germany) Antonia Matic	6	2	2
WC	(Germany) Antonia Matic	2	6	6						2	(Greece) Eleni Daniilidou	6	6
WC	(Egypt) Sara Nael	0	0							8	(Hungary) Kyra Nagy	2	0
WC	(Germany) Stephanie Gehrlein	6	6		WC	(Germany) Stephanie Gehrlein	1	1
					8	(Hungary) Kyra Nagy	6	6

==== Third qualifier ====
First round
(Romania) Andreea Vanc	6	6
WC	(Germany) Caroline Schneider	4	1
WC	(Germany) Vanessa Henke	6	6
WC	(Algeria) Samia Medjahdi	1	1
(Germany) Angelika Bachmann	6	1	2
6	(Ukraine) Kateryna Bondarenko	4	6	6

Second round
9	(India) Shikha Uberoi	6	6
(Romania) Andreea Vanc	2	3
WC	(Germany) Vanessa Henke	7	5	2
6	(Ukraine) Kateryna Bondarenko	5	7	6

Qualifying competition
9	(India) Shikha Uberoi	2	6	6
6	(Ukraine) Kateryna Bondarenko	6	3	3

==== Fourth qualifier ====
First round
(United States) Neha Uberoi	6	6
(Belarus) Ekaterina Dzehalevich	0	2
(United Kingdom) Elena Baltacha	6	6
(Germany) Adriana Barna	0	3
(Japan) Shiho Hisamatsu	3	1
7	(Luxembourg) Anne Kremer	6	6

Second round
4	(China) Sun Tiantian	1	4
(United States) Neha Uberoi	6	6
(United Kingdom) Elena Baltacha	6	6
7	(Luxembourg) Anne Kremer	3	0

Qualifying competition
(United States) Neha Uberoi	6	6^{5}	6
(United Kingdom) Elena Baltacha	3	7	3
