= 2004 Qatar Ladies Open – Doubles =

Doubles
- 2004 Qatar Ladies Open

Final
- Champion: (Russia) Svetlana Kuznetsova (Russia) Elena Likhovtseva
- Runner-up: (Slovakia) Janette Husárová (Spain) Conchita Martínez
- Score: 7–6(4), 6–2

Events
Singles	Doubles
- Qatar Ladies Open

Janet Lee and Wynne Prakusya were the defending champions, but both didn't participate in 2004.

Svetlana Kuznetsova and Elena Likhovtseva won the title.

== Seeds ==
1. (South Africa) Liezel Huber / (Japan) Ai Sugiyama (semifinals)
2. (Russia) Svetlana Kuznetsova / (Russia) Elena Likhovtseva (winners)
3. (Venezuela) María Vento-Kabchi / (Indonesia) Angelique Widjaja (first round)
4. (Slovakia) Janette Husárová / (Spain) Conchita Martínez (final)

== Results ==
Key

- Q = Qualifier
- WC = Wild card
- LL = Lucky loser
- Alt = Alternate
- ITF = ITF entry
- PR = Protected ranking
- SR = Special ranking
- SE = Special exempt
- JE = Junior exempt
- JR = Junior Accelerator Programme entrant
- CO = College Accelerator Programme entrant
- NG = Next Gen Accelerator Program entrant
- w/o = Walkover
- r = Retired
- d = Defaulted

=== Draw ===
First round
1	(South Africa) L Huber (Japan) A Sugiyama	7	6
WC	(France) S Cohen-Aloro (Tunisia) S Sfar	5	3
(China) Z Yan (China) J Zheng	6	6
(Belgium) E Callens (France) C Dhenin	4	4
4	(Slovakia) J Husárová (Spain) C Martínez	1	6	6
(Russia) G Fattakhetdinova (Russia) G Fokina	6	0	1
(China) T Li (China) T Sun	7	3	6
(Australia) A Molik (Spain) M Serna	5	6	4
(Russia) E Kulikovskaia (Belarus) T Poutchek	4	4
Q	(Republic of Ireland) K Liggan (Hungary) K Nagy	6	6
(Russia) L Krasnoroutskaia (Russia) A Myskina	4	7	6
3	(Venezuela) M Vento-Kabchi (Indonesia) A Widjaja	6	6^{3}	3
(France) S Testud (Italy) R Vinci	7	6
(Estonia) M Ani (Czech Republic) L Průšová	6^{1}	2
(Italy) S Farina Elia (Italy) M Santangelo	2	3
2	(Russia) S Kuznetsova (Russia) E Likhovtseva	6	6

Quarterfinals
1	(South Africa) L Huber (Japan) A Sugiyama	6	6
(China) Z Yan (China) J Zheng	3	3
4	(Slovakia) J Husárová (Spain) C Martínez	6	6
(China) T Li (China) T Sun	1	4
Q	(Republic of Ireland) K Liggan (Hungary) K Nagy	4	4
(Russia) L Krasnoroutskaia (Russia) A Myskina	6	6
(France) S Testud (Italy) R Vinci	6^{0}	3
2	(Russia) S Kuznetsova (Russia) E Likhovtseva	7	6

Semifinals
1	(South Africa) L Huber (Japan) A Sugiyama	2	3
4	(Slovakia) J Husárová (Spain) C Martínez	6	6
(Russia) L Krasnoroutskaia (Russia) A Myskina	5	1
2	(Russia) S Kuznetsova (Russia) E Likhovtseva	7	6

Final
4	(Slovakia) J Husárová (Spain) C Martínez	6^{4}	2
2	(Russia) S Kuznetsova (Russia) E Likhovtseva	7	6
