= 2004 Qatar Ladies Open – Singles =

Singles
- 2004 Qatar Ladies Open

Final
- Champion: (Russia) Anastasia Myskina
- Runner-up: (Russia) Svetlana Kuznetsova
- Score: 4–6, 6–4, 6–4

Events
Singles	Doubles
- Qatar Ladies Open

Anastasia Myskina was the defending champion, and also won the title in 2004.

== Main draw ==
Key

- Q = Qualifier
- WC = Wild card
- LL = Lucky loser
- Alt = Alternate
- ITF = ITF entry
- PR = Protected ranking
- SR = Special ranking
- SE = Special exempt
- JE = Junior exempt
- JR = Junior Accelerator Programme entrant
- CO = College Accelerator Programme entrant
- NG = Next Gen Accelerator Program entrant
- w/o = Walkover
- r = Retired
- d = Defaulted

=== Seeds ===
The top four seeds received a bye into the second round.

1. (Belgium) Justine Henin-Hardenne (semifinals)
2. (United States) Jennifer Capriati (semifinals)
3. (Russia) Anastasia Myskina (champion)
4. (Japan) Ai Sugiyama (second round)
5. (Italy) Silvia Farina Elia (quarterfinals)
6. (Serbia and Montenegro) Jelena Dokić (second round)
7. (Spain) Conchita Martínez (first round)
8. (Spain) Magüi Serna (first round)

=== Finals ===
Semifinals
1	(Belgium) Justine Henin-Hardenne	2	6	3
(Russia) Svetlana Kuznetsova	6	4	6
3	(Russia) Anastasia Myskina	6	6
2	(United States) Jennifer Capriati	2	2

Final
(Russia) Svetlana Kuznetsova	6	4	4
3	(Russia) Anastasia Myskina	4	6	6

=== Top half ===
First round
(Venezuela) M Vento-Kabchi	7	6
Q	(China) T Sun	5	2
WC	(Russia) V Dushevina	1	5
(France) N Dechy	6	7
WC	(France) S Testud	6	6
8	(Spain) M Serna	3	2
(Australia) A Molik	4	3
(United States) M Shaughnessy	6	6
(Russia) S Kuznetsova	6	6
(France) S Cohen-Aloro	1	1
(Germany) A Barna	4	6	6
7	(Spain) C Martínez	6	4	2

Second round
1	(Belgium) J Henin-Hardenne	7	6
(Venezuela) M Vento-Kabchi	5	3
(France) N Dechy	6	5	6
WC	(France) S Testud	2	7	3
4	(Japan) A Sugiyama	3	2
(United States) M Shaughnessy	6	6
(Russia) S Kuznetsova	6	6
(Germany) A Barna	2	3

Quarterfinals
1	(Belgium) J Henin-Hardenne	6	7
(France) N Dechy	1	5
(United States) M Shaughnessy	6	1	3
(Russia) S Kuznetsova	4	6	6

Semifinals
1	(Belgium) J Henin-Hardenne	2	6	3
(Russia) S Kuznetsova	6	4	6

=== Bottom half ===
First round
6	(Serbia and Montenegro) J Dokić	0	6	6
(Australia) N Pratt	6	3	4
Q	(Germany) S Gehrlein	2	3
(China) J Zheng	6	6
Q	(Italy) R Vinci	3	2
(Russia) E Likhovtseva	6	6
5	(Italy) S Farina Elia	6	6
(Russia) L Krasnoroutskaia	3	3
LL	(Indonesia) A Widjaja	6	2	4
(Croatia) J Kostanić	2	6	6
(Belgium) E Callens	6	3	4
Q	(China) T Li	1	6	6

Second round
6	(Serbia and Montenegro) J Dokić	4	1
(China) J Zheng	6	6
(Russia) E Likhovtseva	1	6	1
3	(Russia) A Myskina	6	3	6
5	(Italy) S Farina Elia	6	6
(Croatia) J Kostanić	3	3
Q	(China) T Li	6^{4}	1
2	(United States) J Capriati	7	6

Quarterfinals
(China) J Zheng	2	5
3	(Russia) A Myskina	6	7
5	(Italy) S Farina Elia	6^{6}	1
2	(United States) J Capriati	7	6

Semifinals
3	(Russia) A Myskina	6	6
2	(United States) J Capriati	2	2
