= Dinara Safina =

Russian former tennis player (born 1986)

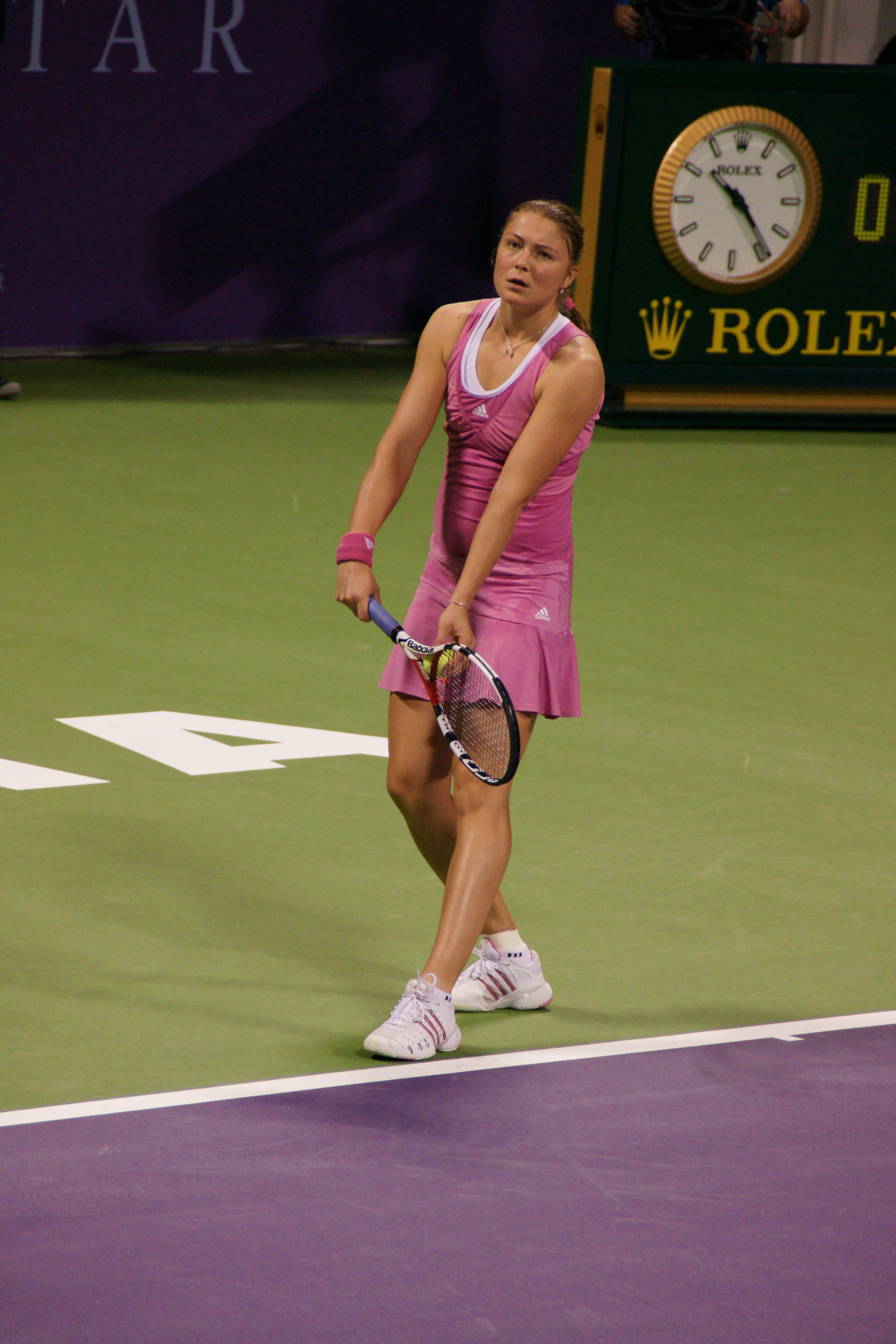
- Safina at the 2008 WTA Championships
- Full name: Dinara Mubinovna Safina
- Native name: Динара Мубиновна Сафина
- Country (sports): Russia
- Residence: Monte Carlo, Monaco
- Born: 27 April 1986 (age 40) Moscow, Soviet Union
- Height: 1.85 m (6 ft 1 in)
- Turned pro: 2000
- Retired: 2014 (last match 2011)
- Plays: Right-handed (two-handed backhand)
- Prize money: $10,585,640

Singles
- Career record: 360–173 (67.5%)
- Career titles: 12
- Highest ranking: No. 1 (20 April 2009)

Grand Slam singles results
- Australian Open: F (2009)
- French Open: F (2008, 2009)
- Wimbledon: SF (2009)
- US Open: SF (2008)

Other tournaments
- Tour Finals: RR (2008, 2009)
- Olympic Games: F (2008)

Doubles
- Career record: 181–91
- Career titles: 9
- Highest ranking: No. 8 (12 May 2008)

Grand Slam doubles results
- Australian Open: QF (2004, 2005)
- French Open: 3R (2006, 2007, 2008)
- Wimbledon: 3R (2005, 2008)
- US Open: W (2007)

Other doubles tournaments
- Olympic Games: QF (2008)

Team competitions
- Fed Cup: W (2005, 2008)
- Hopman Cup: F (2009)
Medal record
Women's tennis
Representing RUS
Olympic Games
Silver medal – second place	2008 Beijing	Singles

Dinara Mubinovna Safina (Russian: Динара Мубиновна Сафина, pronounced [dʲɪˈnarə ˈsafʲɪnə]; Tatar: Динара Мөбин кызы Сафина, romanized: Dinara Möbin kızı Safina; born April 27, 1986) is a Russian former professional tennis player. She was ranked as the world No. 1 in women's singles by the Women's Tennis Association (WTA) for 26 weeks, and world No. 8 in doubles. Safina won twelve WTA Tour-level singles titles and nine in doubles, including the women's doubles title at the 2007 US Open with Nathalie Dechy. She was the runner-up at three major singles tournaments: the 2008 French Open, 2009 Australian Open, and 2009 French Open, and won an Olympic silver medal in singles at the 2008 Beijing Olympics.

Safina officially retired in 2014 due to a long-term back injury. She is the younger sister of former world No. 1 men's player Marat Safin; the brother–sister pair are the first to both achieve the No. 1 singles rankings.

== Biography ==
=== Early life ===
External image
- Young Dinara with her brother Marat and parents — Mubin and Rauza

Safina was born in Moscow to Tatar parents. Her mother Rauza Islanova was her trainer when she was younger; while her father is director of the Spartak tennis club in Moscow. Her brother Marat is a former world No. 1 on the ATP Tour. Speaking of growing up in such a successful tennis family, Safina stated: "Being the little sister in such a big tennis family is not an easy situation. Maybe that's why it took me longer to develop. My father is very competitive, but my parents didn't put pressure on me. I wanted to find my identity. I wanted to be something by myself, like being a big player by myself. So at the beginning I was putting too much pressure on myself. But then gradually I found myself, and I learned how to do better with that situation." At age eight, Safina and her family moved to Valencia, Spain, and as a result Safina speaks fluent Spanish as well as Russian and English.

=== Playing style ===
Safina was coached by Glen Schaap, former coach of Anna Chakvetadze and Nadia Petrova, and Željko Krajan, who worked with her during her rise to No. 1 in 2009. From May 2010, she began working with Gastón Etlis. Their partnership ended after several months and in February 2011 she began working with Davide Sanguinetti.

== Tennis career ==
=== 2002 ===
Safina made her debut in the main draw of a WTA Tour tournament in May 2002, on clay at Estoril, where she lost in the semifinals. She won her first title in Sopot, defeating two seeds – including world No. 24 Patty Schnyder – en route to the final, which she won when opponent Henrieta Nagyová retired during the second set. In doing so, she became the youngest Tour champion in four years and the first qualifier to win a title in three years. She entered the top 100 on the WTA rankings as a result of this win. Later that year, Safina made her debut at a Grand Slam tournament, losing in the second round of the US Open to top seed and eventual champion Serena Williams. In October at Kremlin Cup, she defeated a top 20 player for the first time, world No. 14 Silvia Farina Elia. She finished the season as world No. 68.

=== 2003 ===
Safina won her second title over Katarina Srebotnik at Palermo in July 2003. She lost in the first round in her debuts at the Australian Open, French Open and Wimbledon, although she reached the fourth round at the US Open before losing to second seed and eventual champion Justine Henin. She also made the quarterfinals in Doha, Sopot and Shanghai. She beat world No. 11 Magdalena Maleeva in Moscow, her best win at that point. She finished the season as world No. 54.

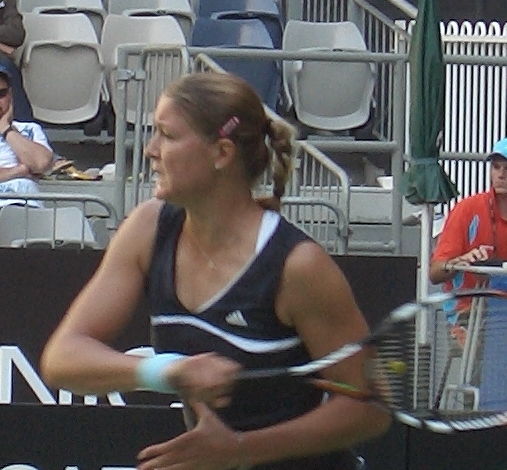
Safina at the 2006 Australian Open

=== 2004 ===
At the Australian Open, Safina defeated a seed at a major event for the first time, upsetting 27th seed Amanda Coetzer in the second round before losing to second seed Kim Clijsters in the third round. However, she failed to make an impact at any of the other Grand Slam tournaments, losing in the second round of the French Open and the first round of both Wimbledon and the US Open, although she pushed eventual runner-up Elena Dementieva to three sets in the latter. She made the third final of her career and first off of clay in October at Luxembourg, losing to Alicia Molik. She finished the season as world No. 44, her first time finishing in the world's top 50.

=== 2005: Fed Cup crown ===
Safina continued to climb the rankings in 2005. At the Australian Open, she lost in the second round to Amélie Mauresmo. However, she defeated Mauresmo in the final in Paris three weeks later, in order to win the third title of her career. This marked her first win over a player ranked in the top 5. Following her win, Safina remarked: "You can't imagine how happy I am. I can't find words to explain how I feel right now. It's by far the best day of my career. I played well, took my chances and beat a top 5 player. It's just too much in one day."

Safina won her second title of 2005 in May at Prague, defeating Zuzana Ondrášková in the final. However, she then lost in the first round of the French Open to Virginie Razzano. She won a match at Wimbledon for the first time, eventually losing in the third round to top seed Lindsay Davenport.

After losing in the first round of the US Open to Maria Elena Camerin, Safina made three semifinals in the fall – in Luxembourg, the Tier I Moscow and Hasselt. In Moscow, she defeated world No. 1 Maria Sharapova in the quarterfinals, her first victory over a number one player. She also played a key role in Russia's victory against France in the Fed Cup, partnering Elena Dementieva to win the doubles rubber. Speaking in 2008, Safina stated: "that was a great experience in my life [...] it also boosted my confidence because I showed I could play well even with the [French] crowd against me." Safina finished the year ranked world No. 20, by far her highest finish.

=== 2006: Top 10 debut, first Grand Slam final in doubles ===
Safina started 2006 by losing in the second round of the Australian Open to Sofia Arvidsson. The highlight of the remainder of the spring hardcourt season was a run to the quarterfinals in Indian Wells, defeating fifth seed Anastasia Myskina before losing to Martina Hingis. On clay, Safina reached her first final at a Tier I tournament in Rome, defeating top 10 players Kim Clijsters, Elena Dementieva, and Svetlana Kuznetsova, before being defeated by Hingis.

At the French Open, Safina made the quarterfinals at a Grand Slam for the first time in her career. In the fourth round, she defeated fourth-seeded Maria Sharapova. In the third set, she trailed 1–5 and was down a match point but won after almost 2½ hours of play. She went on to lose to Kuznetsova in the next round. To kick off the grass court season, she reached her first grass court final at 's-Hertogenbosch, losing to Michaëlla Krajicek. She then lost in the third round of Wimbledon, losing to Ana Ivanovic.

The highlight of Safina's summer hardcourt season was a run to the semifinals of the Tier I Montreal, before ultimately losing to Ana Ivanovic. During the US Open, she again reached a Grand Slam quarterfinal, this time losing to top seed Amélie Mauresmo. She met with greater success in doubles, where she reached the final with partner Katarina Srebotnik. Safina reached the top ten on the singles rankings for the first time in the fall. She finished the season world No. 11.

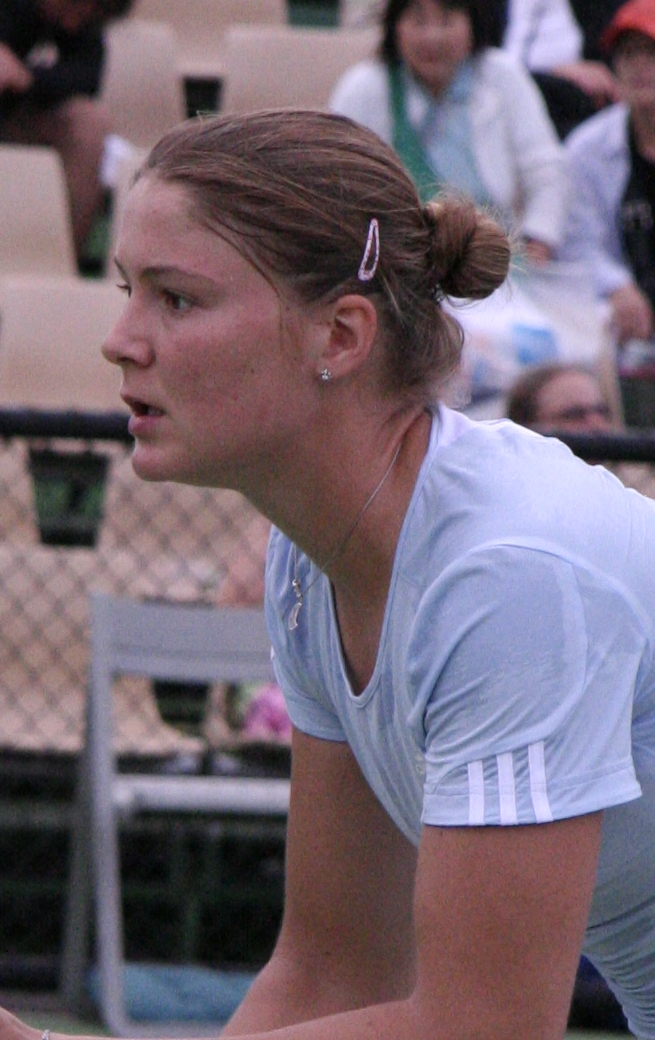
Safina at the 2007 Australian Open

=== 2007: US Open doubles champion ===
Safina won her first tournament of 2007 in Gold Coast, defeating Martina Hingis in the final. Following the match, Hingis praised Safina, saying that "everyone should watch her because she's gonna be maybe even better than her brother", and that she has "more will and desire" than Safin. She also won the doubles title at the tournament. She then lost in the third round of the Australian Open to Li Na.

Safina reached her second final of the year at the Tier I Charleston in April, after retirements from Tatiana Golovin and Vera Zvonareva in the quarterfinals and semifinals respectively. In the final, she lost to Jelena Janković. After reaching the quarterfinals at both Berlin and Rome, Safina lost to Serena Williams in the fourth round of the French Open. During May, she moved up to world No. 9, the highest ranking of her career at the time.

On grass, Safina lost in three sets to Janković in the semifinal of 's-Hertogenbosch, having had a match point in the tiebreaker. Following that loss, she was upset by Akiko Morigami in the second round of Wimbledon.

Safina lost in the fourth round of the US Open to world No. 1 and eventual champion Justine Henin. At the tournament, she partnered Nathalie Dechy to win the women's doubles title, her first Grand Slam title. In October, Safina achieved only her second win over a player ranked in the top 10 that season, defeating world No. 6 Anna Chakvetadze en route to the semifinals of Moscow. She finished the season as world No. 16.

=== 2008: First French Open final, Olympic silver ===
Safina started 2008 poorly, winning just 11 of her first 21 matches. Her best result in singles play during this period was a run to the quarterfinals of Miami, defeating Lindsay Davenport in the fourth round. Safina has admitted that she was considering quitting tennis during this period. Meanwhile, she won doubles titles in Gold Coast, partnering Ágnes Szávay; and in Indian Wells, partnering Elena Vesnina.

In May, at the clay-court event in Berlin, Safina defeated world No. 1 Justine Henin in the third round. Safina went on to defeat Serena Williams for the first time in the quarterfinals, ending Williams's 17-match winning streak. She then defeated Elena Dementieva in the final to win the first Tier I title of her career. Safina retrospectively called the tournament "the key to her tennis life". As the 13th seed at the French Open, Safina defeated new world No. 1 Maria Sharapova, having saved a match point. In the quarterfinals, Safina defeated Dementieva, after saving match points again. Then, in her first Grand Slam semifinal, Safina defeated Svetlana Kuznetsova, before losing to Ana Ivanovic in the final. Her results at this tournament caused her ranking to rise to world No. 9.

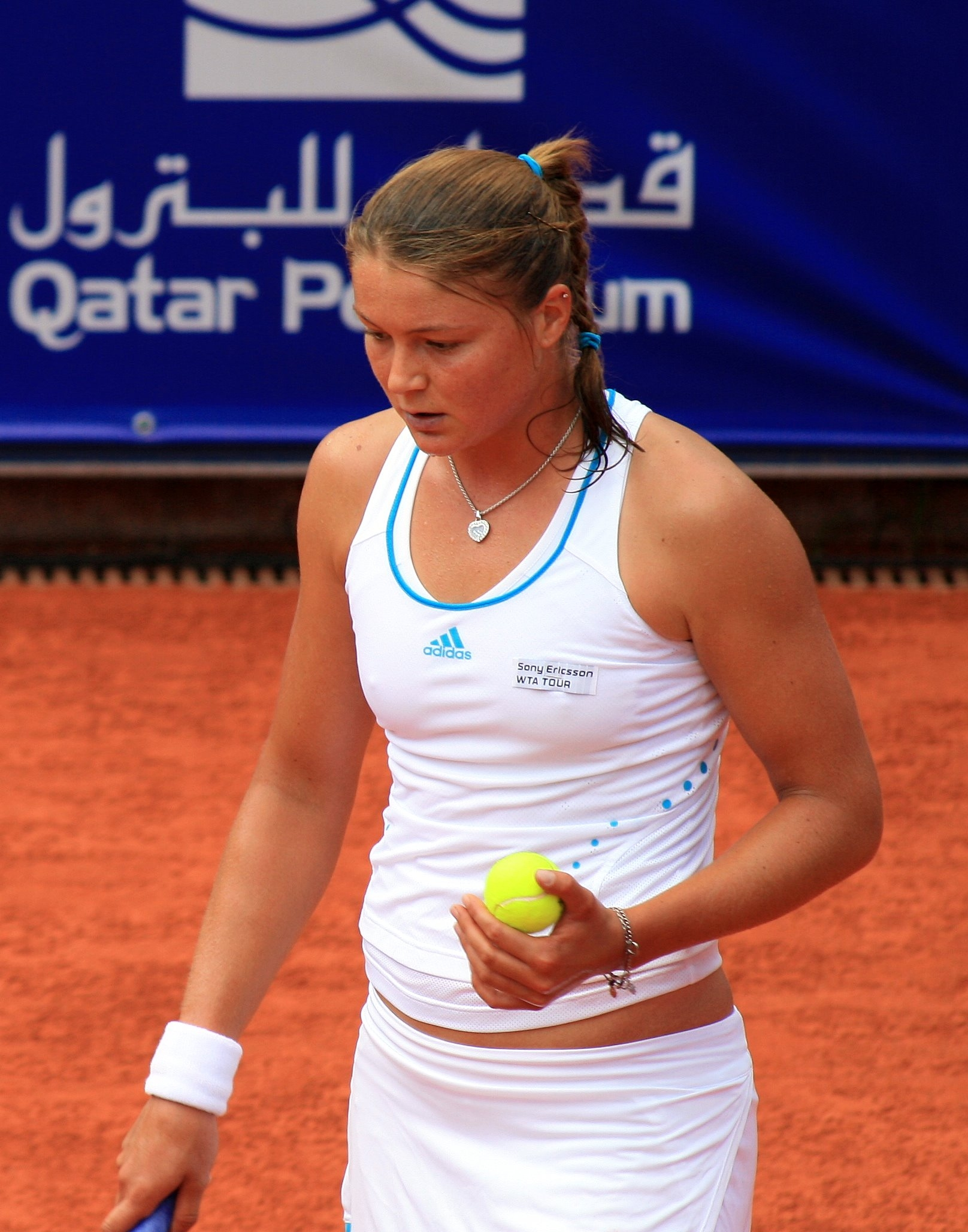
Safina at the German Open (Berlin)

On grass, Safina lost in the final of 's-Hertogenbosch to Tamarine Tanasugarn. At Wimbledon, Safina lost in the third round to Israeli Shahar Pe'er.

At Los Angeles in July, Safina defeated top-seeded Jelena Janković in the semifinals before claiming her second title of the year by defeating Flavia Pennetta in the final. The following week, Safina won the Tier I Montreal, defeating Dominika Cibulková in the final. This marked the first time in her career that she had won titles at back-to-back tournaments, and it moved her up to world No. 6, her highest career ranking at the time. She also won the US Open Series as a result of this victory.

Representing Russia at the Beijing Olympics, Safina defeated world No. 1 Jelena Janković in the quarterfinals in three sets, making her the first player in the history of the WTA Tour to defeat three different reigning World No. 1 players in the same year. In the semifinals, she defeated Li Na in straight sets. In the gold medal match, Safina lost to Dementieva in three sets while serving 23 double faults. She went into the US Open as one of five women who could have taken the world No. 1 ranking, depending on their results in this tournament. However, she lost in the semifinals to the eventual champion Serena Williams. After this tournament, her ranking rose to a career high of world No. 5.

Safina won her third Tier I title of the year and fourth title overall in Tokyo in September, defeating Kuznetsova in the final. This win moved her ranking to a new career-high of world No. 3, before later briefly becoming the No. 2 in October. She qualified for the year-ending WTA Championships for the first time in her career, but she lost all three of her round robin matches. She finished the year ranked No. 3, the first time she had finished a year in the world's top 10.

=== 2009: Australian & French Open finals, world No. 1 ===
Safina began 2009 by representing Russia with her brother Marat Safin in the Hopman Cup. They lost to the Slovak team in the final.

Safina played her first WTA Tour tournament of the season in Sydney, where she lost in the final to Elena Dementieva. At the Australian Open, Safina defeated Alizé Cornet in the fourth round. Safina defeated the Australian wild-card entry Jelena Dokić in the quarterfinals and Vera Zvonareva in the semifinals to reach the second Grand Slam final of her career. She lost to Serena Williams in the final in 59 minutes. After losing early in Dubai to Virginie Razzano, Safina went on to the Indian Wells tournament, where she reached the quarterfinals before losing to Victoria Azarenka. In Miami, Safina lost in the third round to Samantha Stosur.

On April 20, Safina became the 19th player, and second Russian after Maria Sharapova, to be ranked world No. 1 by the WTA. Safina and her brother Marat Safin are the first ever brother-sister world No. 1 pair, with Safin having been ranked world No. 1 by the ATP earlier in his career.

Safina started the clay season with fresh determination to win a Grand Slam. Playing in her first tournament as the world No. 1, Safina lost in the final of the indoor clay court event in Stuttgart to Svetlana Kuznetsova. The following week in Rome, Safina defeated Venus Williams in the semifinals, and Kuznetsova in the final. Safina then advanced to the final at the Madrid event, where she defeated Caroline Wozniacki to win her second consecutive title. As the top seed at the French Open, Safina dropped only five games in advancing to the quarterfinals. She eventually advanced to her third Grand Slam final and second straight French Open final, where she lost to Kuznetsova in straight sets.

At Wimbledon, Safina advanced to the fourth round for the first time, where she defeated 2006 champion Amélie Mauresmo. She went on to reach the semifinals before losing to Venus Williams. She lost 1–6, 0–6 which is the biggest defeat for a current number one in WTA Tour history. Her performance invoked criticism about her status as the No. 1 player in particular from the new Wimbledon champion and world No. 2, Serena Williams who openly mocked her credibility as the top player.

After winning a small tournament in Portorož, Safina failed to defend her title in Los Angeles. Despite this, she became the first player to qualify for the WTA Tour Championships. The following week in Cincinnati, Safina advanced to her eighth final of the season, losing to former world No. 1 Jelena Janković. Safina was the top seed at the US Open, but lost in the third round to Petra Kvitová.

Following back-to-back second round losses in Tokyo and Beijing, Safina lost the No. 1 rank to Serena Williams. She regained it two weeks later on October 26. At the WTA Championships, she had a chance to end the season as No. 1 for the first time in her career, but retired due to a back injury in her first round robin match, which she claimed had been bothering her for three months.

=== 2010: Beginning of career decline ===
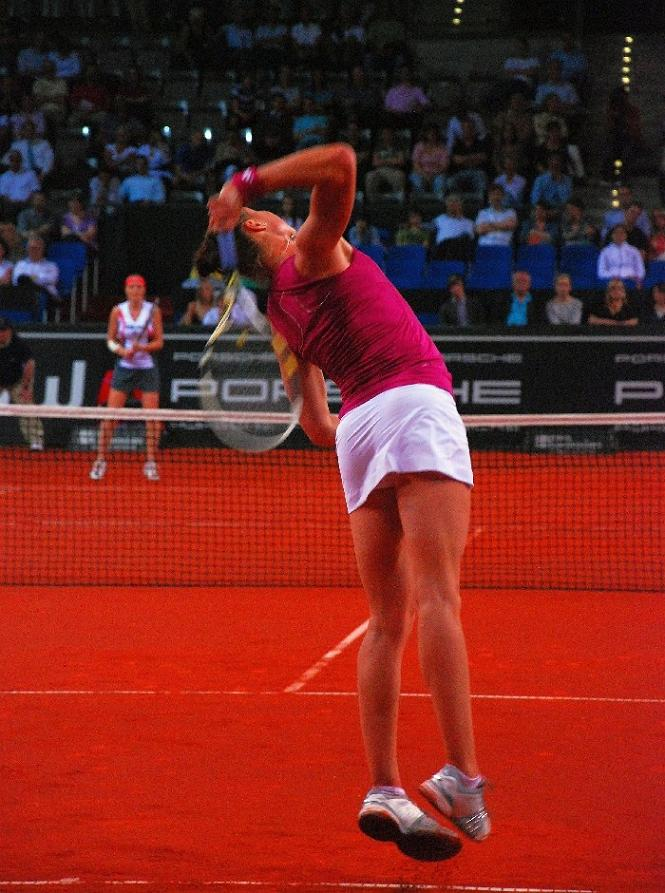
Dinara Safina serving at the 2010 Stuttgart Porsche Cup

Safina started 2010 by losing in the quarterfinals to Elena Dementieva in Sydney. At the Australian Open, she reached the fourth round where she retired with a back injury which also forced her to withdraw from tournaments in Dubai, Indian Wells, and Miami.

In her return to competitive tennis for the clay season, Safina lost in the quarterfinals of Stuttgart to Shahar Pe'er. She struggled through the rest of the clay season, losing her opening matches in Rome, Madrid and the French Open, causing her ranking to drop to No. 20. She later withdrew from Wimbledon after being dealt her fifth straight loss at a warm-up tournament in 's-Hertogenbosch.

She began the US Open Series at the Bank of the West Classic in Stanford, California, where Safina was given a wildcard. She played veteran Kimiko Date-Krumm in the first round. Safina lost in three sets.

In the first round of the Mercury Insurance Open in San Diego, California, Safina ended her 6 match losing streak when she defeated Alona Bondarenko in the first round. She then lost to Agnieszka Radwańska in the second round.

Safina's next tournament was at the Western & Southern Financial Group Masters and Women's Open in Cincinnati. In the second round, she lost to Kim Clijsters. Due to her inability to defend her points from 2009, she dropped from world No. 35 to No. 70. At the Rogers Cup she scored wins over world No. 36 Andrea Petkovic and No. 21 Nadia Petrova to reach the third round, where she lost to sixth seed Francesca Schiavone. Safina defeated Schiavone in the first round of the Pilot Pen Tennis in New Haven, but lost to Maria Kirilenko in the quarterfinals. At the US Open, Safina was eliminated in the first round by Daniela Hantuchová.

Safina accepted a wild card from the Hansol Korea Open, where she defeated qualifier Simona Halep in the first round. She also won against Maria Kirilenko in straight sets. She lost to Klára Zakopalová in the quarterfinals. Safina was unseeded coming into the Pan Pacific Open in Tokyo, where she faced Julia Görges of Germany in the first round, but lost in three sets. At the China Open, Safina lost to Vera Zvonareva in the first round.

=== 2011: Final year ===
At the ASB Classic in Auckland, New Zealand, Safina was defeated by No.2 seed Yanina Wickmayer in the first round. In the Hobart International, facing Marion Bartoli in the first round, she lost again in two sets. At the Australian Open, she was defeated by eventual champion Kim Clijsters in the first round with a double bagel.

At the Malaysian Open, Dinara was able to end her six-match losing streak with her first win since September 2010, defeating Han Xinyun. Then she lost against Šafářová. Safina next competed at BNP Paribas Open, where she reached the fourth round, including wins over 26th seed Daniela Hantuchová and world No. 4 Samantha Stosur. Her run came to an end against Maria Sharapova in the fourth round. Safina announced she would not compete for the rest of 2011 because of a persistent back injury (stress fracture).

Safina allegedly retired from professional tennis, as announced by her brother Marat Safin, on October 7, 2011: "Dinara has decided to end her career", Safin said. "She has taken the decision relatively well. She considers it just to be the end of a period in her life." Safin said the main reason for his 25-year-old sister's retirement was a chronic back injury. "Everything is all right with her health. She feels good in everyday life, but (the back injury means) she simply can't play tennis professionally any more." However, Dinara Safina herself later that day issued a Twitter message, where she said she had not made any retirement decision yet, and that she needed more time to decide.

=== Since 2012 ===
Dinara announced on June 12, 2012, that she requested wildcards for the Bank of the West Classic in Stanford, the Montreal Open, the Cincinnati Open and the US Open. In a later interview, she announced that she withdrew the requests for wildcard entries for all tournaments for 2012. In late 2012, Safina was linked to doping doctor Luis Garcia del Moral.

In 2014, Safina officially retired from tennis after the final day of Madrid Open following years of injuries.

== Rivalries ==
=== Safina vs. Kuznetsova ===
Safina and fellow Russian Svetlana Kuznetsova met 14 times, with Safina leading their head-to-head 8–6. Kuznetsova led their rivalry on clay courts but trailed their rivalry on hard courts. The pair never met on grass. Their last meeting was in the final of the 2009 French Open, with Kuznetsova winning in straight sets and reversing a semi-final loss to Safina from twelve months earlier.

=== Safina vs. Dementieva ===
Safina and Dementieva have been playing each other since 2003, four times on clay, five times on hard and one on grass and carpet, their series ended 6–5 in Dementieva's favour. Their most significant meeting was at the final of the 2008 Summer Olympics which Dementieva won in three sets and a gold medal for Russia. When they met at the 2008 French Open quarterfinals, Safina was down a set and was down 2–5 after saving match point. She then went on to win the match with a score of 4–6, 7–6, 6–0.

== Career statistics ==
=== Grand Slam tournament performance timelines ===
Key
W	F	SF	QF	#R	RR	Q#	DNQ	A	NH

(W) winner; (F) finalist; (SF) semifinalist; (QF) quarterfinalist; (#R) rounds 4, 3, 2, 1; (RR) round-robin stage; (Q#) qualification round; (DNQ) did not qualify; (A) absent; (NH) not held; (SR) strike rate (events won / competed); (W–L) win–loss record.
To avoid confusion and double counting, these charts are updated at the conclusion of a tournament or when the player's participation has ended.

=== Singles ===
Tournament	2002	2003	2004	2005	2006	2007	2008	2009	2010	2011	W–L	W%
Australian Open	A	1R	3R	2R	2R	3R	1R	F	4R	1R	15–9	63%
French Open	A	1R	2R	1R	QF	4R	F	F	1R	A	20–8	71%
Wimbledon	Q3	1R	1R	3R	3R	2R	3R	SF	A	A	12–7	63%
US Open	2R	4R	1R	1R	QF	4R	SF	3R	1R	A	18–9	67%
Win–loss	1–1	3–4	3–4	3–4	11–4	9–4	13–4	19–4	3–3	0–1	65–33	66%

=== Doubles ===
Tournament	2003	2004	2005	2006	2007	2008	2009	2010	2011	W–L
Australian Open	A	A	QF	2R	3R	1R	A	A	1R	6–5
French Open	A	2R	2R	3R	3R	3R	A	2R	A	9–6
Wimbledon	A	A	3R	A	1R	3R	A	A	A	4–3
US Open	A	1R	1R	F	W	A	A	A	A	11–3
Win–loss	0–0	1–2	6–4	8–3	10–3	4–3	0–0	1–1	0–1	30–17

=== Grand Slam tournament finals ===
==== Singles: 3 (runner-ups) ====
Result	Year	Tournament	Surface	Opponent	Score
Loss	2008	French Open	Clay	(Serbia) Ana Ivanovic	4–6, 3–6
Loss	2009	Australian Open	Hard	(United States) Serena Williams	0–6, 3–6
Loss	2009	French Open	Clay	(Russia) Svetlana Kuznetsova	4–6, 2–6

==== Doubles: 2 (1 title, 1 runner-up) ====
Result	Year	Tournament	Surface	Partner	Opponents	Score
Loss	2006	US Open	Hard	(Slovenia) Katarina Srebotnik	(France) Nathalie Dechy (Russia) Vera Zvonareva	6–7, 5–7
Win	2007	US Open	Hard	(France) Nathalie Dechy	(Chinese Taipei) Chan Yung-jan (Chinese Taipei) Chuang Chia-jung	6–4, 6–2

Sporting positions
Preceded by Serena Williams; Serena Williams	World No. 1 April 20, 2009 – October 11, 2009; October 26, 2009 – November 2, 2009	Succeeded by Serena Williams; Serena Williams
Preceded by Maria Sharapova	US Open Series Champion; 2008	Succeeded by Elena Dementieva
Awards
Preceded by Ana Ivanovic	WTA Most Improved Player; 2008	Succeeded by Yanina Wickmayer
