= WTA Qatar Open =

Qatar Open
- 2026 Qatar TotalEnergies Open

WTA Tour
- Founded: 2001; 25 years ago
- Location: Doha; Qatar
- Venue: Khalifa International Tennis and Squash Complex
- Category: WTA 1000 (2024)
- Surface: Hard - outdoors
- Draw: 56S / 32Q / 28D
- Prize money: US$4,088,211 (2026)
- Website: WTAQatarOpen.com

Current champions (2026)
- Singles: (Czech Republic) Karolína Muchová
- Doubles: (Kazakhstan) Anna Danilina (Serbia) Aleksandra Krunić

The Qatar Open (Arabic: بطولة قطر توتال), known as the Qatar TotalEnergies Open for sponsorship reasons, is a professional tennis WTA 1000 tournament held in Doha, Qatar. Held since 2001, this WTA Tour event was a Tier I-tournament in 2008, and was played on outdoor hardcourts. After a two-year break the tournament returned in 2011 and is held at the Khalifa International Tennis and Squash Complex.

== History ==
The first tournament was held in 2001 as Qatar Total FinaElf Open for the prize money of $170,000, as a Tier III tournament. In 2004, the tournament got Tier II category because of an increase in prize money to $585,000, and in 2007 to $600,000. For the 2008 season, which was the last season it was held, the tournament became Tier I for the prize money of $2,500,000. The event then took a two-year break due to the venue hosting the WTA Tour Championship, thus not being played in 2009 or 2010. The tournament returned in 2011 as a Premier Event with the prize money of $721,000 and a 32-competitor singles draw (16-pair doubles draw). The tournament received Premier 5 status from 2012 to 2014, but in the 2015 WTA Season the tournament was back to a Premier event. It then switched back to being a Premier 5 tournament in 2016, when the Dubai Tennis Championships was downgraded to Premier. From then, the two tournaments alternated between Premier 5 and Premier (now known as WTA 1000 and WTA 500) status every year until 2024, when both events were held as WTA 1000 events.

The event is held at the Khalifa International Tennis and Squash Complex which currently has a capacity of 6,911. It was originally much smaller but had a makeover in 2008. Its prize money as of 2016 was $2,517,250 and the tournament director is Saad Al Mohannadi.

== Past finals ==
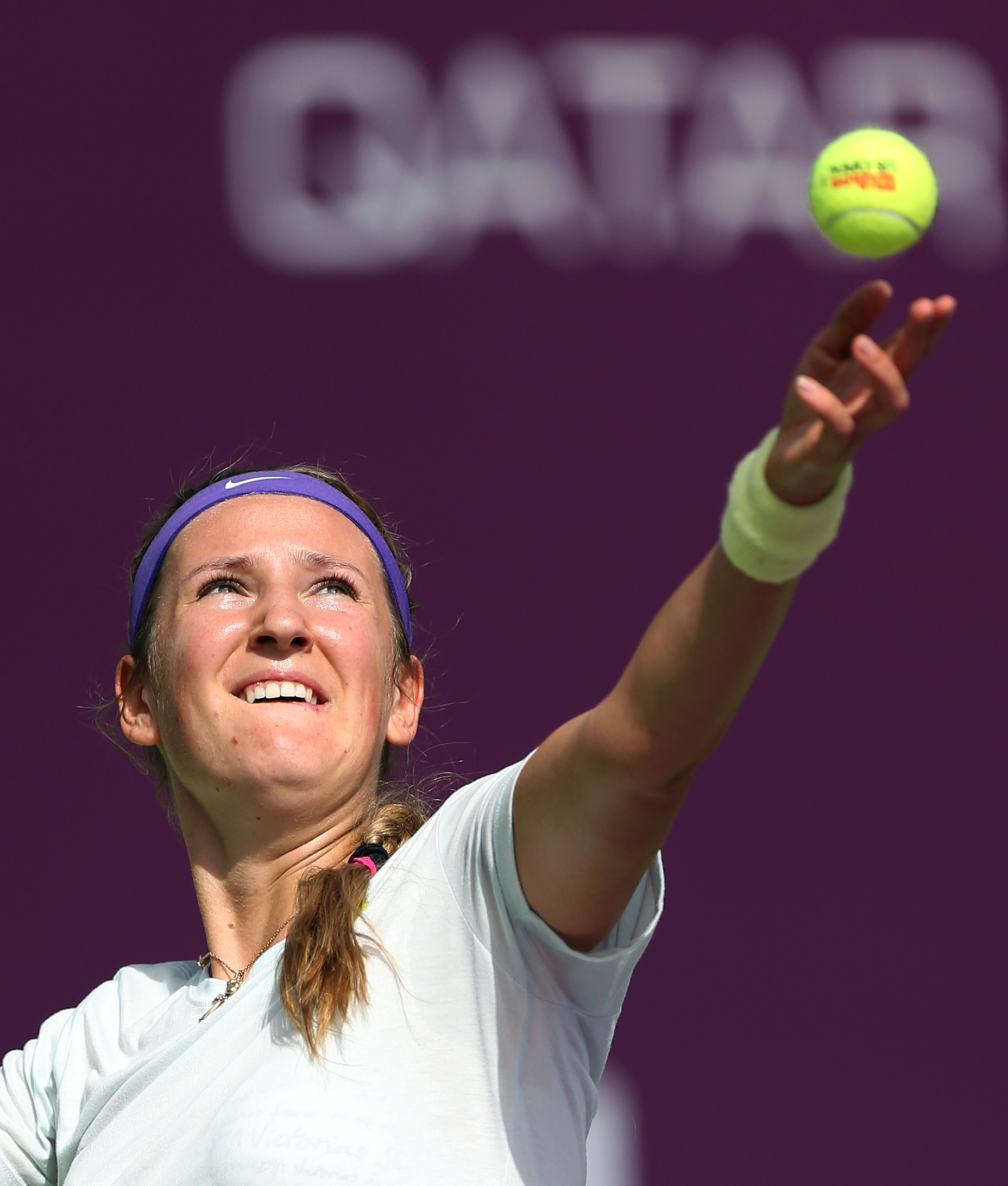
Victoria Azarenka serving at the 2012 Qatar Ladies Open

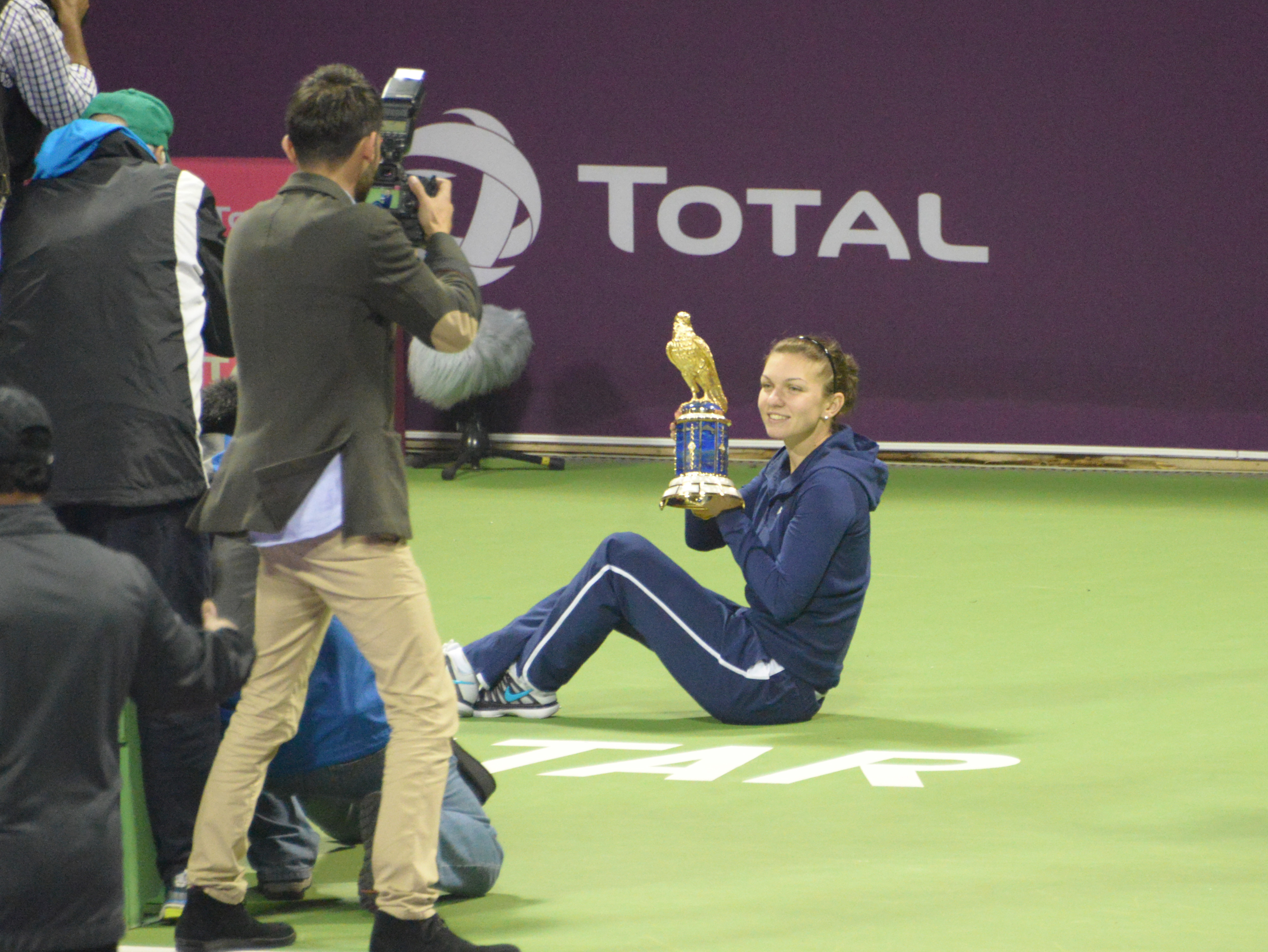
Two-time world No. 1. Simona Halep took home her first Premier 5 trophy at the Khalifa International Complex in 2014.

=== Singles ===
Year	Champion	Runner-up	Score
↓ Tier III tournament ↓
2001	(Switzerland) Martina Hingis	(France) Sandrine Testud	6–3, 6–2
2002	(United States) Monica Seles	(Thailand) Tamarine Tanasugarn	7–6^{(8–6)}, 6–3
2003	(Russia) Anastasia Myskina	(Russia) Elena Likhovtseva	6–3, 6–1
↓ Tier II tournament ↓
2004	(Russia) Anastasia Myskina (2)	(Russia) Svetlana Kuznetsova	4–6, 6–4, 6–4
2005	(Russia) Maria Sharapova	(Australia) Alicia Molik	4–6, 6–1, 6–4
2006	(Russia) Nadia Petrova	(France) Amélie Mauresmo	6–3, 7–5
2007	(Belgium) Justine Henin	(Russia) Svetlana Kuznetsova	6–4, 6–2
↓ Tier I tournament ↓
2008	(Russia) Maria Sharapova (2)	(Russia) Vera Zvonareva	6–1, 2–6, 6–0
2009–2010	Not Held		
↓ Premier tournament ↓
2011	(Russia) Vera Zvonareva	(Denmark) Caroline Wozniacki	6–4, 6–4
↓ Premier 5 tournament ↓
2012	(Belarus) Victoria Azarenka	(Australia) Samantha Stosur	6–1, 6–2
2013	(Belarus) Victoria Azarenka (2)	(United States) Serena Williams	7–6^{(8–6)}, 2–6, 6–3
2014	(Romania) Simona Halep	(Germany) Angelique Kerber	6–2, 6–3
↓ Premier tournament ↓
2015	(Czech Republic) Lucie Šafářová	(Belarus) Victoria Azarenka	6–4, 6–3
↓ Premier 5 tournament ↓
2016	(Spain) Carla Suárez Navarro	(Latvia) Jeļena Ostapenko	1–6, 6–4, 6–4
↓ Premier tournament ↓
2017	(Czech Republic) Karolína Plíšková	(Denmark) Caroline Wozniacki	6–3, 6–4
↓ Premier 5 tournament ↓
2018	(Czech Republic) Petra Kvitová	(Spain) Garbiñe Muguruza	3–6, 6–3, 6–4
↓ Premier tournament ↓
2019	(Belgium) Elise Mertens	(Romania) Simona Halep	3–6, 6–4, 6–3
↓ Premier 5 tournament ↓
2020	(Belarus) Aryna Sabalenka	(Czech Republic) Petra Kvitová	6–3, 6–3
↓ WTA 500 tournament ↓
2021	(Czech Republic) Petra Kvitová (2)	(Spain) Garbiñe Muguruza	6–2, 6–1
↓ WTA 1000 tournament ↓
2022	(Poland) Iga Świątek	(Estonia) Anett Kontaveit	6–2, 6–0
↓ WTA 500 tournament ↓
2023	(Poland) Iga Świątek (2)	(United States) Jessica Pegula	6–3, 6–0
↓ WTA 1000 tournament ↓
2024	(Poland) Iga Świątek (3)	(Kazakhstan) Elena Rybakina	7–6^{(10–8)}, 6–2
2025	(United States) Amanda Anisimova	(Latvia) Jeļena Ostapenko	6–4, 6–3
2026	(Czech Republic) Karolína Muchová	(Canada) Victoria Mboko	6–4, 7–5

=== Doubles ===
Year	Champions	Runners-up	Score
↓ Tier III tournament ↓
2001	(France) Sandrine Testud (Italy) Roberta Vinci	(Netherlands) Kristie Boogert (Netherlands) Miriam Oremans	7–5, 7–6
2002	(Slovakia) Janette Husárová (Spain) Arantxa Sánchez Vicario	(France) Alexandra Fusai (Netherlands) Caroline Vis	6–3, 6–3
2003	(Chinese Taipei) Janet Lee (Indonesia) Wynne Prakusya	(Venezuela) María Vento-Kabchi (Indonesia) Angelique Widjaja	6–1, 6–3
↓ Tier II tournament ↓
2004	(Russia) Svetlana Kuznetsova (Russia) Elena Likhovtseva	(Slovakia) Janette Husárová (Spain) Conchita Martínez	7–6, 6–2
2005	(Italy) Francesca Schiavone (Australia) Alicia Molik	(Zimbabwe) Cara Black (South Africa) Liezel Huber	6–3, 6–4
2006	(Slovakia) Daniela Hantuchová (Japan) Ai Sugiyama	(China) Li Ting (China) Sun Tiantian	6–4, 6–4
2007	(Switzerland) Martina Hingis (Russia) Maria Kirilenko	(Hungary) Ágnes Szávay (Czech Republic) Vladimíra Uhlířová	6–1, 6–1
↓ Tier I tournament ↓
2008	(Czech Republic) Květa Peschke (Australia) Rennae Stubbs	(Zimbabwe) Cara Black (United States) Liezel Huber	6–1, 5–7, [10–7]
2009–2010	Not Held		
↓ Premier tournament ↓
2011	(Czech Republic) Květa Peschke (2) (Slovenia) Katarina Srebotnik	(United States) Liezel Huber (Russia) Nadia Petrova	7–5, 6–7^{(2–7)}, [10–8]
↓ Premier 5 tournament ↓
2012	(United States) Liezel Huber (United States) Lisa Raymond	(United States) Raquel Kops-Jones (United States) Abigail Spears	6–3, 6–1
2013	(Italy) Sara Errani (Italy) Roberta Vinci (2)	(Russia) Nadia Petrova (Slovenia) Katarina Srebotnik	2–6, 6–3, [10–6]
2014	(Chinese Taipei) Hsieh Su-wei (China) Peng Shuai	(Czech Republic) Květa Peschke (Slovenia) Katarina Srebotnik	6–4, 6–0
↓ Premier tournament ↓
2015	(United States) Raquel Kops-Jones (United States) Abigail Spears	(Chinese Taipei) Hsieh Su-wei (India) Sania Mirza	6–4, 6–4
↓ Premier 5 tournament ↓
2016	(Chinese Taipei) Chan Hao-ching (Chinese Taipei) Chan Yung-jan	(Italy) Sara Errani (Spain) Carla Suárez Navarro	6–3, 6–3
↓ Premier tournament ↓
2017	(United States) Abigail Spears (2) (Slovenia) Katarina Srebotnik (2)	(Ukraine) Olga Savchuk (Kazakhstan) Yaroslava Shvedova	6–3, 7–6^{(9–7)}
↓ Premier 5 tournament ↓
2018	(Canada) Gabriela Dabrowski (Latvia) Jeļena Ostapenko	(Slovenia) Andreja Klepač (Spain) María José Martínez Sánchez	6–3, 6–3
↓ Premier tournament ↓
2019	(Chinese Taipei) Chan Hao-ching (2) (Chinese Taipei) Latisha Chan (2)	(Germany) Anna-Lena Grönefeld (Netherlands) Demi Schuurs	6–1, 3–6, [10–6]
↓ Premier 5 tournament ↓
2020	(Chinese Taipei) Hsieh Su-wei (2) (Czech Republic) Barbora Strýcová	(Canada) Gabriela Dabrowski (Latvia) Jeļena Ostapenko	6–2, 5–7, [10–2]
↓ WTA 500 tournament ↓
2021	(United States) Nicole Melichar (Netherlands) Demi Schuurs	(Romania) Monica Niculescu (Latvia) Jeļena Ostapenko	6–2, 2–6, [10–8]
↓ WTA 1000 tournament ↓
2022	(United States) Coco Gauff (United States) Jessica Pegula	(Russia) Veronika Kudermetova (Belgium) Elise Mertens	3–6, 7–5, [10–5]
↓ WTA 500 tournament ↓
2023	(United States) Coco Gauff (2) (United States) Jessica Pegula (2)	(Ukraine) Lyudmyla Kichenok (Latvia) Jeļena Ostapenko	6–4, 2–6, [10–7]
↓ WTA 1000 tournament ↓
2024	(Netherlands) Demi Schuurs (2) (Brazil) Luisa Stefani	(United States) Caroline Dolehide (United States) Desirae Krawczyk	6–4, 6–2
2025	(Italy) Sara Errani (2) (Italy) Jasmine Paolini	(China) Jiang Xinyu (Chinese Taipei) Wu Fang-hsien	7–5, 7–6^{(12–10)}
2026	(Kazakhstan) Anna Danilina (Serbia) Aleksandra Krunić	(Chinese Taipei) Hsieh Su-wei (Latvia) Jeļena Ostapenko	0–6, 7–6^{(7–3)}, [10–8]

== See also ==
- List of tennis tournaments
- WTA Tier I tournaments
- WTA Tour Championships
- ATP Qatar Open
