= Soft tennis at the Asian Games =

- Governing bodies: ISTF (World) / ASTF (Asia)
- Events: 5 (men: 2; women: 2; mixed: 1)

Games
- 1951; 1954; 1958; 1962; 1966; 1970; 1974; 1978; 1982; 1986; 1990; 1994; 1998; 2002; 2006; 2010; 2014; 2018; 2022; 2026; Demonstration sport years indicated in italics
- Medalists

Soft tennis has been an Asian Games sport since the 1994 edition. It was featured at the 1990 Asian Games in Beijing, China, as a demonstration sport.

== Editions ==
Games	Year	Host city	Best nation
12	1994	Hiroshima, Japan	South Korea
13	1998	Bangkok, Thailand	South Korea
14	2002	Busan, South Korea	South Korea
15	2006	Doha, Qatar	Chinese Taipei
16	2010	Guangzhou, China	South Korea
17	2014	Incheon, South Korea	South Korea
18	2018	Jakarta–Palembang, Indonesia	South Korea
19	2022	Hangzhou, China	Japan
20	2026	Nagoya, Japan	Japan

== Events ==
Event	90	94	98	02	06	10	14	18	22	26	Years
Men's singles				X	X	X	X	X	X	X	7
Men's doubles	d	X	X	X	X	X	X				6
Men's team	d	X	X	X	X	X	X	X	X	X	9
Women's singles				X	X	X	X	X	X	X	7
Women's doubles	d	X	X	X	X	X	X				6
Women's team	d	X	X	X	X	X	X	X	X	X	9
Mixed doubles				X	X	X	X	X	X	X	7
Total	0	4	4	7	7	7	7	5	5	5	51

== Medal table ==
Rank	Nation	Gold	Silver	Bronze	Total
1	South Korea (KOR)	26	15	23	64
2	Japan (JPN)	15	15	16	46
3	Chinese Taipei (TPE)	9	15	19	43
4	China (CHN)	1	3	13	17
5	Indonesia (INA)	0	2	6	8
6	North Korea (PRK)	0	1	1	2
7	India (IND)	0	0	1	1
7	Philippines (PHI)	0	0	1	1
Totals (8 entries)		51	51	80	182

== Participating nations ==
Nation	90	94	98	02	06	10	14	18	22	Years
Bangladesh		X								1
Brunei		X								1
Cambodia							3	7	10	3
China	16	X	10	8	7	10	10	5	3	9
Chinese Taipei	16	10	10	10	10	10	10	10	10	9
India						8		10	10	3
Indonesia		X					7	10	7	4
Japan	16	10	10	10	10	10	10	10	10	9
Kazakhstan			4							1
Kyrgyzstan					2					1
Laos						5	7	7		3
Malaysia	X	6								2
Maldives	X	X	5		5					4
Mongolia	X	X	8	10	9	10	10	10	10	9
Nepal	X	X	5	2	5	5	10			7
North Korea						5		4	3	3
Pakistan								8		1
Philippines	X	X	10	4	7	10	3	8	10	9
Singapore	X	X								2
South Korea	X	10	10	10	10	10	10	10	10	9
Tajikistan					2	2	2			3
Thailand	X	X	10				1	10	10	6
Vietnam		X	4				4	4	4	5
Number of nations	11	15	11	7	10	11	13	14	12	
Number of athletes		113	86	54	67	85	87	113	97	
