= Soft tennis at the 2006 Asian Games – Men's singles =

Men's singles at the 2006 Asian Games
- Venue: Khalifa International Tennis and Squash Complex
- Dates: 5–6 December 2006
- Competitors: 19 from 10 nations

Medalists
gold medal	Wang Chun-yen	Chinese Taipei
silver medal	Hidenori Shinohara	Japan
bronze medal	Nam Taek-ho	South Korea

The men's singles soft tennis event was part of the soft tennis programme and took place between December 5 and 6, at the Khalifa International Tennis and Squash Complex.

== Schedule ==
All times are Arabia Standard Time (UTC+03:00)

Date	Time	Event
Tuesday, 5 December 2006	10:00	Group round
Tuesday, 5 December 2006	19:00	Quarterfinals
Wednesday, 6 December 2006	11:00	Semifinals
Wednesday, 6 December 2006	14:00	Final for bronze
Wednesday, 6 December 2006	16:00	Final

== Results ==
=== Group round ===
==== Group A ====
Pos	Athlete	Pld	W	L	GF	GA	GD	Qualification
1	Nam Taek-ho (KOR)	2	2	0	8	0	+8	Semifinals
2	Ahmed Akram (MDV)	2	1	1	4	4	0	
3	Anvar Rakhmatov (TJK)	2	0	2	0	8	−8	

Source: Official website

	Score		Game						
	Score		1	2	3	4	5	6	7
Anvar Rakhmatov (TJK)	0–4	Nam Taek-ho (KOR)	1–4	0–4	0–4	2–4			
Ahmed Akram (MDV)	4–0	Anvar Rakhmatov (TJK)	4–2	5–3	4–2	5–3			
Ahmed Akram (MDV)	0–4	Nam Taek-ho (KOR)	1–4	0–4	0–4	1–4			

==== Group B ====
Pos	Athlete	Pld	W	L	GF	GA	GD	Qualification
1	Lin Shun-wu (TPE)	2	2	0	8	1	+7	Quarterfinals
2	Zhang Dan (CHN)	2	1	1	5	4	+1	
3	Lkhagvasürengiin Temüüjin (MGL)	2	0	2	0	8	−8	

Source: Official website

	Score		Game						
	Score		1	2	3	4	5	6	7
Lkhagvasürengiin Temüüjin (MGL)	0–4	Zhang Dan (CHN)	5–7	0–4	3–5	1–4			
Lin Shun-wu (TPE)	4–0	Lkhagvasürengiin Temüüjin (MGL)	4–1	4–0	4–0	4–1			
Lin Shun-wu (TPE)	4–1	Zhang Dan (CHN)	4–1	3–5	4–1	5–3	4–2		

==== Group C ====
Pos	Athlete	Pld	W	L	GF	GA	GD	Qualification
1	Hidenori Shinohara (JPN)	2	2	0	8	0	+8	Quarterfinals
2	Krishna Bahadur Raut (NEP)	2	1	1	4	7	−3	
3	Michael Enriquez (PHI)	2	0	2	3	8	−5	

Source: Official website

	Score		Game						
	Score		1	2	3	4	5	6	7
Michael Enriquez (PHI)	0–4	Hidenori Shinohara (JPN)	0–4	0–4	1–4	1–4			
Krishna Bahadur Raut (NEP)	4–3	Michael Enriquez (PHI)	3–5	2–4	4–0	5–3	2–4	6–4	7–5
Krishna Bahadur Raut (NEP)	0–4	Hidenori Shinohara (JPN)	0–4	2–4	1–4	1–4			

==== Group D ====
Pos	Athlete	Pld	W	L	GF	GA	GD	Qualification
1	Wang Chun-yen (TPE)	2	2	0	8	1	+7	Quarterfinals
2	Shyam Kumar Lama (NEP)	2	1	1	4	4	0	
3	Negmatullo Rajabaliev (TJK)	2	0	2	1	8	−7	

Source: Official website

	Score		Game						
	Score		1	2	3	4	5	6	7
Shyam Kumar Lama (NEP)	0–4	Wang Chun-yen (TPE)	0–4	5–7	1–4	1–4			
Negmatullo Rajabaliev (TJK)	0–4	Shyam Kumar Lama (NEP)	3–5	4–6	0–4	2–4			
Negmatullo Rajabaliev (TJK)	1–4	Wang Chun-yen (TPE)	0–4	4–6	4–2	1–4	1–4		

==== Group E ====
Pos	Athlete	Pld	W	L	GF	GA	GD	Qualification
1	Naoya Hanada (JPN)	2	2	0	8	2	+6	Quarterfinals
2	Radnaabazaryn Bayartogtokh (MGL)	2	1	1	6	4	+2	
3	Aleksandr Logvinenko (KGZ)	2	0	2	0	8	−8	

Source: Official website

	Score		Game						
	Score		1	2	3	4	5	6	7
Aleksandr Logvinenko (KGZ)	0–4	Naoya Hanada (JPN)	1–4	2–4	1–4	1–4			
Radnaabazaryn Bayartogtokh (MGL)	4–0	Aleksandr Logvinenko (KGZ)	4–1	4–0	4–1	4–0			
Radnaabazaryn Bayartogtokh (MGL)	2–4	Naoya Hanada (JPN)	2–4	2–4	0–4	7–5	4–2	0–4	

==== Group F ====
Pos	Athlete	Pld	W	L	GF	GA	GD	Qualification
1	Kim Jae-bok (KOR)	3	3	0	12	2	+10	Semifinals
2	Xiong Jun (CHN)	3	2	1	8	7	+1	
3	Orlando Silvoza (PHI)	3	1	2	9	9	0	
4	Fareeh Ibrahim (MDV)	3	0	3	1	12	−11	

Source: Official website

	Score		Game						
	Score		1	2	3	4	5	6	7
Fareeh Ibrahim (MDV)	0–4	Kim Jae-bok (KOR)	2–4	0–4	0–4	0–4			
Orlando Silvoza (PHI)	3–4	Xiong Jun (CHN)	3–5	1–4	4–1	5–3	1–4	4–1	1–7
Orlando Silvoza (PHI)	4–1	Fareeh Ibrahim (MDV)	4–2	1–4	4–0	7–5	4–2		
Xiong Jun (CHN)	0–4	Kim Jae-bok (KOR)	3–5	5–7	1–4	2–4			
Xiong Jun (CHN)	4–0	Fareeh Ibrahim (MDV)	4–0	4–2	4–0	4–0			
Orlando Silvoza (PHI)	2–4	Kim Jae-bok (KOR)	3–5	2–4	4–0	0–4	5–3	2–4	

=== Final round ===
Quarterfinals
B1	Lin Shun-wu (TPE)	0	0	0	4	5	2
C1	Hidenori Shinohara (JPN)	4	4	4	2	3	4
D1	Wang Chun-yen (TPE)	8	5	5	5
E1	Naoya Hanada (JPN)	6	3	3	1

Semifinals
A1	Nam Taek-ho (KOR)	4	3	3	4	3	0
C1	Hidenori Shinohara (JPN)	2	5	5	2	5	4
D1	Wang Chun-yen (TPE)	4	5	4	5	4
F1	Kim Jae-bok (KOR)	0	3	2	7	2

Final
C1	Hidenori Shinohara (JPN)	3	2	9	2	4	3
D1	Wang Chun-yen (TPE)	5	4	7	4	2	5
Final for bronze
A1	Nam Taek-ho (KOR)	4	4	1	5	4
F1	Kim Jae-bok (KOR)	2	1	4	3	0

Classification 5–6
B1	Lin Shun-wu (TPE)	4	4	1	4	4
E1	Naoya Hanada (JPN)	0	1	4	1	0
