= Soft tennis at the 2006 Asian Games =

- Venue: Khalifa International Tennis and Squash Complex
- Dates: 2–8 December 2006
- Competitors: 67 from 10 nations

Soft tennis was a discipline of the tennis competitions at the 2006 Asian Games. Competition took place from December 2 to December 8. All events were held at Khalifa International Tennis and Squash Complex.

Singles, Doubles, and Team events were held in this competition, Chinese Taipei finished first in medal table by winning three gold medals.

== Schedule ==
P	Preliminary rounds	¼	Quarterfinals	½	Semifinals	F	Finals

Event↓/Date →	2nd Sat		3rd Sun		4th Mon				5th Tue		6th Wed		7th Thu	8th Fri			
Men's singles									P	¼	½	F					
Men's doubles														P	¼	½	F
Men's team	P	¼	½	F													
Women's singles									P	¼	½	F					
Women's doubles														P	¼	½	F
Women's team	P	¼	½	F													
Mixed doubles					P	¼	½	F									

== Medalists ==
Event	Gold	Silver	Bronze
Men's singles	Wang Chun-yen; Chinese Taipei	Hidenori Shinohara; Japan	Nam Taek-ho; South Korea
Men's doubles	Chinese Taipei; Li Chia-hung; Yang Sheng-fa	South Korea; Kim Jae-bok; You Young-dong	Japan; Shigeo Nakahori; Tsuneo Takagawa
Men's team	Japan; Noaya Hanada; Tatsuro Kawamura; Shigeo Nakahori; Hidenori Shinohara; Tsuneo Takagawa	Chinese Taipei; Li Chia-hung; Lin Shun-wu; Wang Chun-yen; Yang Sheng-fa; Yeh Chia-lin	South Korea; Jong Young-pal; Kim Jae-bok; Nam Taek-ho; We Hyu-hwan; You Young-dong
Women's singles	Chiang Wan-chi; Chinese Taipei	Jiang Ting; China	Miwa Tsuji; Japan
Women's doubles	Japan; Harumi Gyokusen; Ayumi Ueshima	Japan; Hiromi Hamanaka; Miwa Tsuji	South Korea; Kim Kyung-ryun; Lee Kyung-pyo
Women's team	South Korea; Kim Ji-eun; Kim Kyung-ryun; Lee Bok-soon; Lee Kyung-pyo; Min Soo-kyoung	Japan; Harumi Gyokusen; Hiromi Hamanaka; Miwa Tsuji; Eri Uehara; Ayumi Ueshima	Chinese Taipei; Chiang Wan-chi; Chou Chiu-ping; Fang Yen-ling; Lan Yi-yun; Yang Hui-ju
Mixed doubles	South Korea; We Hyu-hwan; Kim Ji-eun	South Korea; You Young-dong; Kim Kyung-ryun	Japan; Tsuneo Takagawa; Harumi Gyokusen

== Medal table ==
Rank	Nation	Gold	Silver	Bronze	Total
1	Chinese Taipei (TPE)	3	1	1	5
2	Japan (JPN)	2	3	3	8
3	South Korea (KOR)	2	2	3	7
4	China (CHN)	0	1	0	1
Totals (4 entries)		7	7	7	21

== Participating nations ==
A total of 67 athletes from 10 nations competed in soft tennis at the 2006 Asian Games:

- China (7)
- Chinese Taipei (10)
- Japan (10)
- Kyrgyzstan (2)
- Maldives (5)
- Mongolia (9)
- Nepal (5)
- Philippines (7)
- South Korea (10)
- Tajikistan (2)
