= Soft tennis at the 2006 Asian Games – Women's team =

Women's team at the 2006 Asian Games
- Venue: Khalifa International Tennis and Squash Complex
- Dates: 2–3 December 2006
- Competitors: 27 from 6 nations

Medalists
gold medal	South Korea; Kim Ji-eun, Kim Kyung-ryun, Lee Bok-soon, Lee Kyung-pyo, Min Soo-kyoung
silver medal	Japan; Harumi Gyokusen, Hiromi Hamanaka, Miwa Tsuji, Eri Uehara, Ayumi Ueshima
bronze medal	Chinese Taipei; Chiang Wan-chi, Chou Chiu-ping, Fang Yen-ling, Lan Yi-yun, Yang Hui-ju

The women's team soft tennis event was part of the soft tennis programme and took place between December 2 and 3, at the Khalifa International Tennis and Squash Complex.

== Schedule ==
All times are Arabia Standard Time (UTC+03:00)

Date	Time	Event
Saturday, 2 December 2006	12:00	Group round
Saturday, 2 December 2006	17:30	Quarterfinals
Sunday, 3 December 2006	09:00	Semifinals
Sunday, 3 December 2006	12:00	Final for bronze
Sunday, 3 December 2006	13:00	Final

== Results ==
=== Group round ===
==== Group A ====
Pos	Team	Pld	W	L	MF	MA	MD	Qualification
1	South Korea	2	2	0	5	1	+4	Semifinals
2	China	2	1	1	4	2	+2	Quarterfinals
3	Philippines	2	0	2	0	6	−6	Quarterfinals

Source: Official website

2 December	Philippines	0–3	South Korea

Petrona Bantay / Divina Escala	1–5	Kim Ji-eun / Lee Kyung-pyo	0–4, 0–4, 6–4, 1–4, 1–4, 1–4
Belen Dante	0–4	Kim Kyung-ryun	0–4, 0–4, 0–4, 0–4
—	0–5	Min Soo-kyoung / Lee Bok-soon	Walkover

2 December	China	3–0	Philippines

Jiang Ting / Shi Yue	5–1	Petrona Bantay / Divina Escala	4–2, 4–1, 4–2, 6–4, 3–5, 4–2
Zhao Lei	4–0	Belen Dante	4–0, 4–0, 4–2, 4–2
Zhao Tingting / Zhang Yan	5–0	—	Walkover

2 December	China	1–2	South Korea

Zhao Tingting / Zhang Yan	0–5	Min Soo-kyoung / Lee Bok-soon	2–4, 1–4, 1–4, 1–4, 1–4
Zhao Lei	4–3	Kim Kyung-ryun	2–4, 7–5, 2–4, 0–4, 4–2, 5–3, 7–2
Jiang Ting / Shi Yue	0–5	Kim Ji-eun / Lee Kyung-pyo	2–4, 2–4, 2–4, 2–4, 0–4

==== Group B ====
Pos	Team	Pld	W	L	MF	MA	MD	Qualification
1	Japan	2	2	0	5	1	+4	Semifinals
2	Chinese Taipei	2	1	1	4	2	+2	Quarterfinals
3	Mongolia	2	0	2	0	6	−6	Quarterfinals

Source: Official website

2 December	Mongolia	0–3	Japan

Gombyn Altanzul / Enkh-Amaryn Azzayaa	1–5	Harumi Gyokusen / Ayumi Ueshima	1–4, 4–2, 1–4, 3–5, 0–4, 1–4
Möngöntsetsegiin Anudari	0–4	Miwa Tsuji	1–4, 1–4, 1–4, 0–4
—	0–5	Eri Uehara / Hiromi Hamanaka	Walkover

2 December	Chinese Taipei	3–0	Mongolia

Chou Chiu-ping / Yang Hui-ju	5–0	Batdorjiin Soyoloo / Enkh-Amaryn Azzayaa	4–1, 4–2, 4–0, 4–1, 4–0
Chiang Wan-chi	4–0	Möngöntsetsegiin Anudari	4–0, 4–1, 4–1, 4–0
Fang Yen-ling / Lan Yi-yun	5–0	—	Walkover

2 December	Chinese Taipei	1–2	Japan

Chiang Wan-chi / Yang Hui-ju	1–5	Harumi Gyokusen / Ayumi Ueshima	2–4, 3–5, 3–5, 3–5, 4–1, 5–7
Fang Yen-ling	1–4	Miwa Tsuji	1–4, 1–4, 4–2, 2–4, 1–4
Chou Chiu-ping / Lan Yi-yun	5–3	Eri Uehara / Hiromi Hamanaka	4–1, 4–0, 4–2, 0–4, 2–4, 1–4, 4–1, 4–0

=== Final round ===
Quarterfinals
A3	Philippines	0
B2	Chinese Taipei	2
A2	China	2
B3	Mongolia	0

Semifinals
A1	South Korea	2
B2	Chinese Taipei	0
A2	China	0
B1	Japan	2

Final
A1	South Korea	2
B1	Japan	1
Final for bronze
B2	Chinese Taipei	2
A2	China	0

Classification 5–6
A3	Philippines	2
B3	Mongolia	0

==== Quarterfinals ====
2 December	Philippines	0–2	Chinese Taipei

Petrona Bantay / Divina Escala	3–5	Fang Yen-ling / Lan Yi-yun	5–3, 4–1, 2–4, 2–4, 3–5, 2–4, 4–2, 2–4
Belen Dante	0–4	Chiang Wan-chi	0–4, 0–4, 1–4, 2–4

2 December	China	2–0	Mongolia

Jiang Ting / Shi Yue	5–1	Enkh-Amaryn Azzayaa / Möngöntsetsegiin Anudari	4–1, 6–4, 1–4, 4–0, 4–0, 4–1
Zhao Lei	4–0	Gombyn Altanzul	4–1, 4–0, 4–1, 4–1

==== Semifinals ====
3 December	South Korea	2–0	Chinese Taipei

Min Soo-kyoung / Lee Bok-soon	5–3	Chou Chiu-ping / Lan Yi-yun	5–3, 8–6, 0–4, 4–1, 1–4, 1–4, 4–1, 4–2
Kim Kyung-ryun	4–2	Chiang Wan-chi	4–1, 3–5, 6–4, 1–4, 4–2, 5–3

3 December	China	0–2	Japan

Zhao Tingting / Zhang Yan	0–5	Harumi Gyokusen / Ayumi Ueshima	1–4, 1–4, 3–5, 1–4, 1–4
Zhao Lei	2–4	Miwa Tsuji	5–3, 1–4, 4–2, 3–5, 3–5, 2–4

==== Classification 5–6 ====
3 December	Philippines	2–0	Mongolia

Divina Escala / Belen Dante	5–3	Möngöntsetsegiin Anudari / Enkh-Amaryn Azzayaa	4–0, 5–7, 4–6, 4–1, 6–4, 3–5, 4–2, 4–1
Petrona Bantay	4–1	Gombyn Altanzul	6–4, 4–0, 2–4, 4–2, 4–1

==== Final for bronze ====
3 December	Chinese Taipei	2–0	China

Chou Chiu-ping / Yang Hui-ju	5–4	Jiang Ting / Shi Yue	4–1, 4–1, 3–5, 4–1, 1–4, 3–5, 7–5, 1–4, 7–4
Chiang Wan-chi	4–2	Zhao Lei	2–4, 5–3, 4–1, 4–2, 2–4, 6–4

==== Final ====
3 December	South Korea	2–1	Japan

Min Soo-kyoung / Lee Bok-soon	2–5	Harumi Gyokusen / Ayumi Ueshima	0–4, 4–2, 7–5, 2–4, 4–6, 0–4, 3–5
Kim Kyung-ryun	4–3	Miwa Tsuji	2–4, 5–7, 0–4, 5–3, 8–6, 4–1, 7–5
Kim Ji-eun / Lee Kyung-pyo	5–4	Eri Uehara / Hiromi Hamanaka	4–1, 4–6, 1–4, 3–5, 5–3, 4–1, 5–3, 1–4, 7–1
