= Soft tennis at the 2006 Asian Games – Men's team =

Men's team at the 2006 Asian Games
- Venue: Khalifa International Tennis and Squash Complex
- Dates: 2–3 December 2006
- Competitors: 34 from 7 nations

Medalists
gold medal	Japan; Noaya Hanada, Tatsuro Kawamura, Shigeo Nakahori, Hidenori Shinohara, Tsuneo Takagawa
silver medal	Chinese Taipei; Li Chia-hung, Lin Shun-wu, Wang Chun-yen, Yang Sheng-fa, Yeh Chia-lin
bronze medal	South Korea; Jong Young-pal, Kim Jae-bok, Nam Taek-ho, We Hyu-hwan, You Young-dong

The men's team soft tennis event was part of the soft tennis programme and took place between December 2 and 3, at the Khalifa International Tennis and Squash Complex.

== Schedule ==
All times are Arabia Standard Time (UTC+03:00)

Date	Time	Event
Saturday, 2 December 2006	12:00	Group round
Saturday, 2 December 2006	17:30	Quarterfinals
Sunday, 3 December 2006	09:00	Semifinals
Sunday, 3 December 2006	14:00	Final for bronze
Sunday, 3 December 2006	15:45	Final

== Results ==
Legend

- WO — Won by walkover

=== Group round ===
==== Group A ====
Pos	Team	Pld	W	L	MF	MA	MD	Qualification
1	South Korea	2	2	0	6	0	+6	Quarterfinals
2	Mongolia	2	1	1	2	4	−2	Quarterfinals
3	Maldives	2	0	2	1	5	−4	Quarterfinals

Source: Official website

2 December	Maldives	0–3	South Korea

Ignaz Mansoor / Ahmed Musthafa	0–5	Jong Young-pal / We Hyu-hwan	1–4, 2–4, 1–4, 1–4, 1–4
Ibrahim Shinan	0–4	Kim Jae-bok	0–4, 0–4, 3–5, 0–4
Ahmed Akram / Fareeh Ibrahim	1–5	Nam Taek-ho / You Young-dong	0–4, 5–3, 0–4, 1–4, 1–4, 0–4

2 December	Mongolia	2–1	Maldives

Radnaabazaryn Bayartogtokh / Lkhagvasürengiin Temüüjin	5–1	Ignaz Mansoor / Fareeh Ibrahim	4–1, 2–4, 4–1, 8–6, 4–2, 4–2
Bolortuyaagiin Enkhjin	1–4	Ibrahim Shinan	0–4, 10–12, 4–2, 3–5, 3–5
Gantulgyn Enkhtüvshin / Ochirsaikhany Bayasgalant	5–2	Ahmed Musthafa / Ahmed Akram	4–2, 2–4, 4–1, 1–4, 8–6, 4–1, 7–5

2 December	Mongolia	0–3	South Korea

Radnaabazaryn Bayartogtokh / Lkhagvasürengiin Temüüjin	2–5	Kim Jae-bok / We Hyu-hwan	4–2, 9–11, 4–2, 2–4, 1–4, 2–4, 2–4
Bolortuyaagiin Enkhjin	0–4	Nam Taek-ho	0–4, 0–4, 0–4, 2–4
Gantulgyn Enkhtüvshin / Ochirsaikhany Bayasgalant	0–5	Jong Young-pal / You Young-dong	0–4, 6–8, 0–4, 0–4, 1–4

==== Group B ====
Pos	Team	Pld	W	L	MF	MA	MD	Qualification
1	Chinese Taipei	3	3	0	8	1	+7	Semifinals
2	Japan	3	2	1	7	2	+5	Quarterfinals
3	Nepal	3	1	2	2	7	−5	Quarterfinals
4	Philippines	3	0	3	1	8	−7	Quarterfinals

Source: Official website

2 December	Nepal	0–3	Japan

Abhishek Aman Jha / Raju Putuwar	1–5	Noaya Hanada / Tatsuro Kawamura	2–4, 0–4, 4–2, 1–4, 0–4, 0–4
Krishna Bahadur Raut	0–4	Hidenori Shinohara	0–4, 0–4, 0–4, 0–4
Shyam Kumar Lama / Dipendra Thapa	0–5	Shigeo Nakahori / Tsuneo Takagawa	1–4, 5–7, 1–4, 0–4, 0–4

2 December	Chinese Taipei	3–0	Philippines

Li Chia-hung / Yang Sheng-fa	5–0	Wenifredo de Leon / Orlando Silvoza	4–1, 4–1, 4–0, 4–0, 5–3
Lin Shun-wu	4–0	Samuel Noguit	4–2, 4–1, 4–2, 6–4
Wang Chun-yen / Yeh Chia-lin	5–0	—	Walkover

2 December	Philippines	0–3	Japan

Wenifredo de Leon / Orlando Silvoza	0–5	Shigeo Nakahori / Tsuneo Takagawa	2–4, 0–4, 1–4, 2–4, 1–4
Michael Enriquez	0–4	Hidenori Shinohara	6–8, 6–8, 4–6, 3–5
—	0–5	Noaya Hanada / Tatsuro Kawamura	Walkover

2 December	Chinese Taipei	3–0	Nepal

Lin Shun-wu / Yeh Chia-lin	5–0	Abhishek Aman Jha / Raju Putuwar	4–2, 4–0, 4–2, 4–0, 4–0
Wang Chun-yen	4–0	Krishna Bahadur Raut	4–2, 4–1, 4–0, 4–2
Yang Sheng-fa / Li Chia-hung	5–0	Shyam Kumar Lama / Dipendra Thapa	4–0, 4–1, 6–4, 4–0, 4–0

2 December	Chinese Taipei	2–1	Japan

Li Chia-hung / Yang Sheng-fa	5–4	Shigeo Nakahori / Tsuneo Takagawa	2–4, 0–4, 4–2, 4–0, 2–4, 4–0, 4–6, 4–2, 7–5
Wang Chun-yen	4–0	Hidenori Shinohara	4–2, 4–1, 5–3, 5–3
Lin Shun-wu / Yeh Chia-lin	4–5	Noaya Hanada / Tatsuro Kawamura	4–0, 3–5, 2–4, 1–4, 4–1, 6–4, 6–4, 2–4, 1–7

2 December	Philippines	1–2	Nepal

Wenifredo de Leon / Orlando Silvoza	3–5	Abhishek Aman Jha / Raju Putuwar	5–3, 6–8, 3–5, 5–3, 4–1, 1–4, 1–4, 0–4
Michael Enriquez	4–0	Krishna Bahadur Raut	4–1, 4–2, 7–5, 4–2
—	0–5	Shyam Kumar Lama / Dipendra Thapa	Walkover

=== Final round ===
Quarterfinals
A1	South Korea	2
B4	Philippines	0
A3	Maldives	0
B2	Japan	2
A2	Mongolia	2
B3	Nepal	0

Semifinals
A1	South Korea	0
B2	Japan	2
A2	Mongolia	0
B1	Chinese Taipei	2

Final
B2	Japan	2
B1	Chinese Taipei	1
Final for bronze
A1	South Korea	2
A2	Mongolia	0

Classification 5–8			Classification 5–6
B4	Philippines	WO
A3	Maldives		B4	Philippines	2
			B3	Nepal	0

==== Quarterfinals ====
2 December	South Korea	2–0	Philippines

Kim Jae-bok / You Young-dong	5–0	Wenifredo de Leon / Samuel Noguit	4–0, 4–1, 4–1, 4–2, 4–1
Nam Taek-ho	4–1	Orlando Silvoza	3–5, 4–1, 4–1, 5–3, 4–1

2 December	Maldives	0–2	Japan

Ignaz Mansoor / Fareeh Ibrahim	0–5	Noaya Hanada / Tatsuro Kawamura	1–4, 1–4, 0–4, 3–5, 2–4
Ahmed Akram	0–4	Hidenori Shinohara	1–4, 1–4, 2–4, 2–4

2 December	Mongolia	2–0	Nepal

Ochirsaikhany Bayasgalant / Lkhagvasürengiin Temüüjin	5–1	Krishna Bahadur Raut / Dipendra Thapa	4–2, 4–2, 5–3, 1–4, 4–0, 4–2
Radnaabazaryn Bayartogtokh	4–1	Shyam Kumar Lama	4–1, 5–3, 4–6, 4–0, 4–2

==== Classification 5–8 ====
3 December	Philippines	2–0	Maldives

—	5–0	—	Walkover
—	4–0	—	Walkover

==== Semifinals ====
3 December	South Korea	0–2	Japan

Kim Jae-bok / You Young-dong	2–5	Noaya Hanada / Tatsuro Kawamura	5–3, 2–4, 5–3, 2–4, 4–6, 1–4, 2–4
Nam Taek-ho	2–4	Hidenori Shinohara	4–6, 4–2, 3–5, 2–4, 4–1, 0–4

3 December	Mongolia	0–2	Chinese Taipei

Lkhagvasürengiin Temüüjin / Ochirsaikhany Bayasgalant	0–5	Li Chia-hung / Yang Sheng-fa	5–7, 1–4, 1–4, 2–4, 1–4
Radnaabazaryn Bayartogtokh	2–4	Wang Chun-yen	0–4, 2–4, 7–5, 4–1, 1–4, 2–4

==== Classification 5–6 ====
3 December	Philippines	2–0	Nepal

Wenifredo de Leon / Samuel Noguit	5–0	Raju Putuwar / Abhishek Aman Jha	4–2, 4–2, 4–1, 4–2, 4–0
Michael Enriquez	4–0	Krishna Bahadur Raut	7–5, 6–4, 4–2, 4–2

==== Final for bronze ====
3 December	South Korea	2–0	Mongolia

Jong Young-pal / We Hyu-hwan	5–0	Ochirsaikhany Bayasgalant / Lkhagvasürengiin Temüüjin	4–2, 5–3, 5–3, 4–2, 4–0
Kim Jae-bok	4–3	Radnaabazaryn Bayartogtokh	4–2, 5–3, 2–4, 2–4, 4–2, 5–7, 7–5

==== Final ====
3 December	Japan	2–1	Chinese Taipei

Noaya Hanada / Tatsuro Kawamura	1–5	Li Chia-hung / Yang Sheng-fa	0–4, 2–4, 4–2, 3–5, 0–4, 1–4
Hidenori Shinohara	4–1	Wang Chun-yen	0–4, 4–2, 4–1, 4–1, 5–3
Shigeo Nakahori / Tsuneo Takagawa	5–3	Lin Shun-wu / Yeh Chia-lin	4–1, 4–1, 4–0, 2–4, 2–4, 5–7, 4–0, 4–1
