= Soft tennis at the 2006 Asian Games – Men's doubles =

Men's doubles at the 2006 Asian Games
- Venue: Khalifa International Tennis and Squash Complex
- Dates: 8 December 2006
- Competitors: 32 from 9 nations

Medalists
gold medal	Li Chia-hung; Yang Sheng-fa	Chinese Taipei
silver medal	Kim Jae-bok; You Young-dong	South Korea
bronze medal	Shigeo Nakahori; Tsuneo Takagawa	Japan

The men's doubles soft tennis event was part of the soft tennis programme and took place on December 8, at the Khalifa International Tennis and Squash Complex.

== Schedule ==
All times are Arabia Standard Time (UTC+03:00)

Date	Time	Event
Friday, 8 December 2006	09:20	Round of 16
Friday, 8 December 2006	11:00	Quarterfinals
Friday, 8 December 2006	15:00	Semifinals
Friday, 8 December 2006	17:00	Final for bronze
Friday, 8 December 2006	19:00	Final

== Results ==
=== Finals ===
Final
1	Kim Jae-bok (KOR); You Young-dong (KOR)	3	2	2	4	1	4	8	2
6	Li Chia-hung (TPE); Yang Sheng-fa (TPE)	5	4	4	2	4	1	6	4

Final for bronze
5	Naoya Hanada (JPN); Tatsuro Kawamura (JPN)	3	0	0	3	4	0
2	Shigeo Nakahori (JPN); Tsuneo Takagawa (JPN)	5	4	4	5	1	4

Classification 5–8									Classification 5–6
8	Gantulgyn Enkhtüvshin (MGL); Ochirsaikhany Bayasgalant (MGL)	0	4	3	5	4	5	4
4	Lin Shun-wu (TPE); Yeh Chia-lin (TPE)	4	2	5	3	2	3	0	8	Gantulgyn Enkhtüvshin (MGL); Ochirsaikhany Bayasgalant (MGL)	5	1	2	0	1	4
3	Jong Young-pal (KOR); We Hyu-hwan (KOR)	4	6	1	3	4	2	0	7	Xiong Jun (CHN); Zhang Dan (CHN)	3	4	4	4	4	6
7	Xiong Jun (CHN); Zhang Dan (CHN)	1	4	4	5	6	4	4

=== Top half ===
Round of 16
1	Kim Jae-bok (KOR); You Young-dong (KOR)	4	6	4	4	4
Fareeh Ibrahim (MDV); Ignaz Mansoor (MDV)	0	4	0	0	2
Negmatullo Rajabaliev (TJK); Anvar Rakhmatov (TJK)	1	0	0	3	4
8	Gantulgyn Enkhtüvshin (MGL); Ochirsaikhany Bayasgalant (MGL)	4	4	4	5	6
5	Naoya Hanada (JPN); Tatsuro Kawamura (JPN)	4	1	2	4	4	4	4
Michael Enriquez (PHI); Orlando Silvoza (PHI)	2	4	4	0	0	1	2
Abhishek Aman Jha (NEP); Raju Putuwar (NEP)	1	2	2	4	0	1
4	Lin Shun-wu (TPE); Yeh Chia-lin (TPE)	4	4	4	2	4	4

Quarterfinals
1	Kim Jae-bok (KOR); You Young-dong (KOR)	4	4	4	4	4
8	Gantulgyn Enkhtüvshin (MGL); Ochirsaikhany Bayasgalant (MGL)	1	0	1	1	2
5	Naoya Hanada (JPN); Tatsuro Kawamura (JPN)	4	4	2	0	4	4	4
4	Lin Shun-wu (TPE); Yeh Chia-lin (TPE)	2	2	4	4	2	2	2

Semifinals
1	Kim Jae-bok (KOR); You Young-dong (KOR)	1	4	5	5	4	4
5	Naoya Hanada (JPN); Tatsuro Kawamura (JPN)	4	1	3	3	0	2

=== Bottom half ===
Round of 16
3	Jong Young-pal (KOR); We Hyu-hwan (KOR)	4	4	4	4	6
Krishna Bahadur Raut (NEP); Dipendra Thapa (NEP)	0	2	1	2	4
Ahmed Akram (MDV); Ahmed Musthafa (MDV)	1	2	1	0	0
6	Li Chia-hung (TPE); Yang Sheng-fa (TPE)	4	4	4	4	4
7	Xiong Jun (CHN); Zhang Dan (CHN)	5	7	5	6	4
Wenifredo de Leon (PHI); Samuel Noguit (PHI)	3	5	3	4	1
Lkhagvasürengiin Temüüjin (MGL); Radnaabazaryn Bayartogtokh (MGL)	1	1	0	0	1
2	Shigeo Nakahori (JPN); Tsuneo Takagawa (JPN)	4	4	4	4	4

Quarterfinals
3	Jong Young-pal (KOR); We Hyu-hwan (KOR)	2	1	3	4	4	2
6	Li Chia-hung (TPE); Yang Sheng-fa (TPE)	4	4	5	2	6	4
7	Xiong Jun (CHN); Zhang Dan (CHN)	0	0	5	1	4	3	3
2	Shigeo Nakahori (JPN); Tsuneo Takagawa (JPN)	4	4	3	4	2	5	5

Semifinals
6	Li Chia-hung (TPE); Yang Sheng-fa (TPE)	3	4	5	2	3	7	7	7	7
2	Shigeo Nakahori (JPN); Tsuneo Takagawa (JPN)	5	0	3	4	5	5	9	5	1
