= Soft tennis at the 2006 Asian Games – Women's singles =

Women's singles at the 2006 Asian Games
- Venue: Khalifa International Tennis and Squash Complex
- Dates: 5–6 December 2006
- Competitors: 13 from 7 nations

Medalists
gold medal	Chiang Wan-chi	Chinese Taipei
silver medal	Jiang Ting	China
bronze medal	Miwa Tsuji	Japan

The women's singles soft tennis event was part of the soft tennis programme and took place between December 5 and 6, at the Khalifa International Tennis and Squash Complex.

== Schedule ==
All times are Arabia Standard Time (UTC+03:00)

Date	Time	Event
Tuesday, 5 December 2006	09:00	Group round
Tuesday, 5 December 2006	18:00	Quarterfinals
Wednesday, 6 December 2006	09:00	Semifinals
Wednesday, 6 December 2006	13:00	Final for bronze
Wednesday, 6 December 2006	15:00	Final

== Results ==
Legend

- WO — Won by walkover

=== Group round ===
==== Group A ====
Pos	Athlete	Pld	W	L	GF	GA	GD	Qualification
1	Kim Kyung-ryun (KOR)	2	2	0	8	1	+7	Quarterfinals
2	Fang Yen-ling (TPE)	2	1	1	5	5	0	Quarterfinals
3	Belen Dante (PHI)	2	0	2	1	8	−7	

Source: Official website

	Score		Game						
	Score		1	2	3	4	5	6	7
Belen Dante (PHI)	0–4	Kim Kyung-ryun (KOR)	0–4	2–4	0–4	1–4			
Fang Yen-ling (TPE)	4–1	Belen Dante (PHI)	4–1	1–4	4–0	4–2	4–2		
Fang Yen-ling (TPE)	1–4	Kim Kyung-ryun (KOR)	5–7	13–11	1–4	0–4	3–5		

==== Group B ====
Pos	Athlete	Pld	W	L	GF	GA	GD	Qualification
1	Harumi Gyokusen (JPN)	2	2	0	8	2	+6	Quarterfinals
2	Zhao Lei (CHN)	2	1	1	6	4	+2	Quarterfinals
3	Möngöntsetsegiin Anudari (MGL)	2	0	2	0	8	−8	

Source: Official website

	Score		Game						
	Score		1	2	3	4	5	6	7
Möngöntsetsegiin Anudari (MGL)	0–4	Harumi Gyokusen (JPN)	2–4	1–4	0–4	1–4			
Zhao Lei (CHN)	4–0	Möngöntsetsegiin Anudari (MGL)	4–1	4–1	4–1	4–2			
Zhao Lei (CHN)	2–4	Harumi Gyokusen (JPN)	5–3	3–5	1–4	3–5	5–3	1–4	

==== Group C ====
Pos	Athlete	Pld	W	L	GF	GA	GD	Qualification
1	Chiang Wan-chi (TPE)	2	2	0	8	3	+5	Quarterfinals
2	Jiang Ting (CHN)	2	1	1	7	4	+3	Quarterfinals
3	Petrona Bantay (PHI)	2	0	2	0	8	−8	

Source: Official website

	Score		Game						
	Score		1	2	3	4	5	6	7
Petrona Bantay (PHI)	0–4	Jiang Ting (CHN)	2–4	0–4	6–8	3–5			
Chiang Wan-chi (TPE)	4–0	Petrona Bantay (PHI)	5–3	4–0	4–1	4–2			
Chiang Wan-chi (TPE)	4–3	Jiang Ting (CHN)	2–4	6–4	4–0	4–6	6–4	1–4	11–9

==== Group D ====
Pos	Athlete	Pld	W	L	GF	GA	GD	Qualification
1	Kim Ji-eun (KOR)	3	3	0	12	0	+12	Quarterfinals
2	Miwa Tsuji (JPN)	3	2	1	8	4	+4	Quarterfinals
3	Gombyn Altanzul (MGL)	3	1	2	4	9	−5	
4	Asel Otunchieva (KGZ)	3	0	3	1	12	−11	

Source: Official website

	Score		Game						
	Score		1	2	3	4	5	6	7
Asel Otunchieva (KGZ)	0–4	Kim Ji-eun (KOR)	0–4	1–4	0–4	0–4			
Miwa Tsuji (JPN)	4–0	Gombyn Altanzul (MGL)	4–1	4–2	4–0	4–0			
Gombyn Altanzul (MGL)	0–4	Kim Ji-eun (KOR)	0–4	0–4	0–4	1–4			
Miwa Tsuji (JPN)	4–0	Asel Otunchieva (KGZ)	4–0	4–0	4–1	4–0			
Miwa Tsuji (JPN)	0–4	Kim Ji-eun (KOR)	1–4	2–4	2–4	5–7			
Gombyn Altanzul (MGL)	4–1	Asel Otunchieva (KGZ)	4–2	4–2	7–5	1–4	5–3		

=== Final round ===
Quarterfinals
A1	Kim Kyung-ryun (KOR)	4	1	2	6	2	4	6
D2	Miwa Tsuji (JPN)	1	4	4	4	4	2	8
C2	Jiang Ting (CHN)	1	1	4	4	4	4
B1	Harumi Gyokusen (JPN)	4	4	2	1	1	1
C1	Chiang Wan-chi (TPE)	3	4	4	5	6	4	7
B2	Zhao Lei (CHN)	5	1	6	3	8	0	2
A2	Fang Yen-ling (TPE)	4	0	2	4	2
D1	Kim Ji-eun (KOR)	2	4	4	6	4

Semifinals
D2	Miwa Tsuji (JPN)	2	2	4	5	4	1
C2	Jiang Ting (CHN)	4	4	1	7	1	4
C1	Chiang Wan-chi (TPE)	4	7	6	4
D1	Kim Ji-eun (KOR)	2	5	4	2

Final
C2	Jiang Ting (CHN)	2	1	1	4	1
C1	Chiang Wan-chi (TPE)	4	4	4	2	4
Final for bronze
D2	Miwa Tsuji (JPN)	W	O
D1	Kim Ji-eun (KOR)

Classification 5–8									Classification 5–6
A1	Kim Kyung-ryun (KOR)	1	0	1	3
B1	Harumi Gyokusen (JPN)	4	4	4	5				B1	Harumi Gyokusen (JPN)	4	8	4	2	1	6
B2	Zhao Lei (CHN)	3	4	4	5	6	4	7	B2	Zhao Lei (CHN)	2	6	0	4	4	4
A2	Fang Yen-ling (TPE)	5	1	6	3	8	0	2
