= Soft tennis at the 2006 Asian Games – Mixed doubles =

Men's doubles at the 2006 Asian Games
- Venue: Khalifa International Tennis and Squash Complex
- Dates: 4 December 2006
- Competitors: 26 from 7 nations

Medalists
gold medal	We Hyu-hwan; Kim Ji-eun	South Korea
silver medal	You Young-dong; Kim Kyung-ryun	South Korea
bronze medal	Tsuneo Takagawa; Harumi Gyokusen	Japan

The mixed doubles soft tennis event was part of the soft tennis programme and took place on December 4, at the Khalifa International Tennis and Squash Complex.

== Schedule ==
All times are Arabia Standard Time (UTC+03:00)

Date	Time	Event
Monday, 4 December 2006	09:00	Round of 16
Monday, 4 December 2006	10:00	Quarterfinals
Monday, 4 December 2006	15:00	Semifinals
Monday, 4 December 2006	17:00	Final for bronze
Monday, 4 December 2006	18:00	Final

== Results ==
=== Finals ===
Final
1	You Young-dong (KOR); Kim Kyung-ryun (KOR)	0	4	5	4	1	1	4
	We Hyu-hwan (KOR); Kim Ji-eun (KOR)	4	1	7	2	4	4	6

Final for bronze
	Shigeo Nakahori (JPN); Ayumi Ueshima (JPN)	4	1	1	1	5	1	4	3
3	Tsuneo Takagawa (JPN); Harumi Gyokusen (JPN)	2	4	4	4	3	4	2	5

Classification 5–8								Classification 5–6
	Radnaabazaryn Bayartogtokh (MGL); Möngöntsetsegiin Anudari (MGL)	2	2	3	6	2	2
	Yeh Chia-lin (TPE); Fang Yen-ling (TPE)	4	4	5	4	4	4		Yeh Chia-lin (TPE); Fang Yen-ling (TPE)	3	7	0	3	2	1
	Orlando Silvoza (PHI); Petrona Bantay (PHI)	3	0	0	3	2		2	Li Chia-hung (TPE); Chou Chiu-ping (TPE)	5	5	4	5	4	4
2	Li Chia-hung (TPE); Chou Chiu-ping (TPE)	5	4	4	5	4

=== Top half ===
Round of 16
Radnaabazaryn Bayartogtokh (MGL); Möngöntsetsegiin Anudari (MGL)	4	4	4	4	4
Aleksandr Logvinenko (KGZ); Asel Otunchieva (KGZ)	1	1	0	1	0
Wenifredo de Leon (PHI); Divina Escala (PHI)	4	1	1	2	1	4
Yeh Chia-lin (TPE); Fang Yen-ling (TPE)	2	4	4	4	4	6
Shigeo Nakahori (JPN); Ayumi Ueshima (JPN)	2	4	0	4	4	5	4
4	Zhang Dan (CHN); Jiang Ting (CHN)	4	1	4	1	2	3	0

Quarterfinals
1	You Young-dong (KOR); Kim Kyung-ryun (KOR)	2	4	6	4	4	4	5
Radnaabazaryn Bayartogtokh (MGL); Möngöntsetsegiin Anudari (MGL)	4	1	8	1	2	2	3
Yeh Chia-lin (TPE); Fang Yen-ling (TPE)	8	7	2	3	2	2
Shigeo Nakahori (JPN); Ayumi Ueshima (JPN)	6	9	4	5	4	4

Semifinals
1	You Young-dong (KOR); Kim Kyung-ryun (KOR)	3	5	5	4	4	5	5
Shigeo Nakahori (JPN); Ayumi Ueshima (JPN)	5	3	7	2	0	3	3

=== Bottom half ===
Round of 16								Quarterfinals								Semifinals
								3	Tsuneo Takagawa (JPN); Harumi Gyokusen (JPN)	3	4	5	4	4	4
Orlando Silvoza (PHI); Petrona Bantay (PHI)	4	5	4	5	4				Orlando Silvoza (PHI); Petrona Bantay (PHI)	5	2	3	0	1	2
Lkhagvasürengiin Temüüjin (MGL); Enkh-Amaryn Azzayaa (MGL)	0	3	0	3	1											3	Tsuneo Takagawa (JPN); Harumi Gyokusen (JPN)	1	1	1	4	3	1
We Hyu-hwan (KOR); Kim Ji-eun (KOR)	4	4	3	4	2	4	4										We Hyu-hwan (KOR); Kim Ji-eun (KOR)	4	4	4	1	5	4
Xiong Jun (CHN); Zhao Tingting (CHN)	0	2	5	2	4	1	1		We Hyu-hwan (KOR); Kim Ji-eun (KOR)	4	4	4	4	4
								2	Li Chia-hung (TPE); Chou Chiu-ping (TPE)	1	1	1	2	2
