= Soft tennis at the 2006 Asian Games – Women's doubles =

Women's doubles at the 2006 Asian Games
- Venue: Khalifa International Tennis and Squash Complex
- Dates: 8 December 2006
- Competitors: 22 from 6 nations

Medalists
gold medal	Harumi Gyokusen; Ayumi Ueshima	Japan
silver medal	Hiromi Hamanaka; Miwa Tsuji	Japan
bronze medal	Kim Kyung-ryun; Lee Kyung-pyo	South Korea

The women's doubles soft tennis event was part of the soft tennis programme and took place on December 8, at the Khalifa International Tennis and Squash Complex.

== Schedule ==
All times are Arabia Standard Time (UTC+03:00)

Date	Time	Event
Friday, 8 December 2006	09:20	Round of 16
Friday, 8 December 2006	10:00	Quarterfinals
Friday, 8 December 2006	12:00	Semifinals
Friday, 8 December 2006	16:00	Final for bronze
Friday, 8 December 2006	17:00	Final

== Results ==
=== Finals ===
Final
1	Harumi Gyokusen (JPN); Ayumi Ueshima (JPN)	1	2	2	2	5	5	4	4	7
7	Hiromi Hamanaka (JPN); Miwa Tsuji (JPN)	4	4	4	4	3	3	2	1	3

Final for bronze
4	Kim Kyung-ryun (KOR); Lee Kyung-pyo (KOR)	4	4	1	5	1	4	4	4
3	Kim Ji-eun (KOR); Lee Bok-soon (KOR)	2	1	4	7	4	2	0	2

Classification 5–8										Classification 5–6
	Chou Chiu-ping (TPE); Yang Hui-ju (TPE)	1	0	4	4	4	2	4	1
5	Jiang Ting (CHN); Shi Yue (CHN)	4	4	2	2	6	4	2	4	5	Jiang Ting (CHN); Shi Yue (CHN)	4	4	3	4	5	3	4	4
6	Zhang Yan (CHN); Zhao Tingting (CHN)	4	4	4	5	0	4	4	5	6	Zhang Yan (CHN); Zhao Tingting (CHN)	0	1	5	2	7	5	0	2
2	Fang Yen-ling (TPE); Lan Yi-yun (TPE)	2	6	2	3	4	6	1	3

=== Top half ===
Round of 16							Quarterfinals											Semifinals
							1	Harumi Gyokusen (JPN); Ayumi Ueshima (JPN)	6	2	4	6	4	4	4	6	7
	Chou Chiu-ping (TPE); Yang Hui-ju (TPE)	4	4	4	4	5		Chou Chiu-ping (TPE); Yang Hui-ju (TPE)	4	4	6	4	0	6	0	8	4
8	Enkh-Amaryn Azzayaa (MGL); Möngöntsetsegiin Anudari (MGL)	0	0	2	1	3												1	Harumi Gyokusen (JPN); Ayumi Ueshima (JPN)	6	4	4	4	4
																		4	Kim Kyung-ryun (KOR); Lee Kyung-pyo (KOR)	4	2	2	1	2
							5	Jiang Ting (CHN); Shi Yue (CHN)	3	1	4	2	4
							4	Kim Kyung-ryun (KOR); Lee Kyung-pyo (KOR)	5	4	6	4	6

=== Bottom half ===
Round of 16								Quarterfinals								Semifinals
								3	Kim Ji-eun (KOR); Lee Bok-soon (KOR)	4	7	4	4	4	4
	Batdorjiin Soyoloo (MGL); Gombyn Altanzul (MGL)	0	1	0	1	0		6	Zhang Yan (CHN); Zhao Tingting (CHN)	2	9	0	2	0	1
6	Zhang Yan (CHN); Zhao Tingting (CHN)	4	4	4	4	4										3	Kim Ji-eun (KOR); Lee Bok-soon (KOR)	5	1	4	3	4	5	1	5
7	Hiromi Hamanaka (JPN); Miwa Tsuji (JPN)	4	1	5	4	4	4									7	Hiromi Hamanaka (JPN); Miwa Tsuji (JPN)	7	4	1	5	2	3	4	7
	Petrona Bantay (PHI); Divina Escala (PHI)	2	4	3	1	1	0	7	Hiromi Hamanaka (JPN); Miwa Tsuji (JPN)	4	5	4	5	4
								2	Fang Yen-ling (TPE); Lan Yi-yun (TPE)	2	3	1	3	1
