= Wrestling at the 2006 Asian Games – Women's freestyle 48 kg =

Women's freestyle 48 kg at the 2006 Asian Games
- Venue: Aspire Hall 4
- Date: 11 December 2006
- Competitors: 13 from 13 nations

Medalists
gold medal	Chiharu Icho	Japan
silver medal	Kim Hyung-joo	South Korea
bronze medal	Tsogtbazaryn Enkhjargal	Mongolia
bronze medal	Li Xiaomei	China

The women's freestyle 48 kilograms wrestling competition at the 2006 Asian Games in Doha was held on 11 December 2006 at the Aspire Hall 4.

This freestyle wrestling competition consisted of a single-elimination tournament, with a repechage used to determine the winner of two bronze medals. The two finalists faced off for gold and silver medals. Each wrestler who lost to one of the two finalists moved into the repechage, culminating in a pair of bronze medal matches featuring the semifinal losers each facing the remaining repechage opponent from their half of the bracket.

Each bout consisted of up to three rounds, lasting two minutes apiece. The wrestler who scored more points in each round was the winner of that rounds; the bout finished when one wrestler had won two rounds (and thus the match).

== Schedule ==
All times are Arabia Standard Time (UTC+03:00)

Date	Time	Event
Monday, 11 December 2006	09:00	Preliminary
Monday, 11 December 2006	09:00	Quarterfinals
Monday, 11 December 2006	09:00	Semifinals
Monday, 11 December 2006	09:00	Repechages
Monday, 11 December 2006	18:00	Finals

== Results ==
Legend

- F — Won by fall

=== Main bracket ===
Preliminary
Kang Son-a (PRK)	3	2	4
Sunisa Klahan (THA)	0	5	1
Li Xiaomei (CHN)	3	5
Neha Rathi (IND)	0	1
Dinara Mirzaeva (UZB)	0	1
Lê Thị Trang (VIE)	1	7
Zhuldyz Eshimova (KAZ)	3^{F}
Chov Sotheara (CAM)	0
Chiharu Icho (JPN)	1	8
Wu Li-chuan (TPE)	0	0

Quarterfinals
Kim Hyung-joo (KOR)	0	1	3
Tsogtbazaryn Enkhjargal (MGL)	1	0	0
Gulnara Isabekova (KGZ)	0	0
Kang Son-a (PRK)	2	4^{F}
Li Xiaomei (CHN)	5	2
Lê Thị Trang (VIE)	0	0
Zhuldyz Eshimova (KAZ)	0	0
Chiharu Icho (JPN)	1	1

Semifinals
Kim Hyung-joo (KOR)	3	1
Kang Son-a (PRK)	0	0
Li Xiaomei (CHN)	1	0	1
Chiharu Icho (JPN)	0	1	3

Gold medal match
Kim Hyung-joo (KOR)	0	0
Chiharu Icho (JPN)	1	3

=== Repechage ===
Repechage
Wu Li-chuan (TPE)	1	3	2
Zhuldyz Eshimova (KAZ)	1	3	1

Bronze medal match
Tsogtbazaryn Enkhjargal (MGL)	3	3
Kang Son-a (PRK)	1	0
Wu Li-chuan (TPE)	0	1
Li Xiaomei (CHN)	1	2

== Final standing ==
Rank	Athlete
1st place, gold medalist(s)	Chiharu Icho (JPN)
2nd place, silver medalist(s)	Kim Hyung-joo (KOR)
3rd place, bronze medalist(s)	Tsogtbazaryn Enkhjargal (MGL)
3rd place, bronze medalist(s)	Li Xiaomei (CHN)
5	Kang Son-a (PRK)
5	Wu Li-chuan (TPE)
7	Zhuldyz Eshimova (KAZ)
8	Lê Thị Trang (VIE)
9	Sunisa Klahan (THA)
10	Dinara Mirzaeva (UZB)
10	Neha Rathi (IND)
12	Chov Sotheara (CAM)
13	Gulnara Isabekova (KGZ)
