= Boxing at the 2006 Asian Games – Men's 54 kg =

Boxing competitions

Men's 54 kg at the 2006 Asian Games
- Venue: Aspire Hall 5
- Date: 2–13 December 2006
- Competitors: 19 from 19 nations

Medalists
gold medal	Joan Tipon	Philippines
silver medal	Han Soon-chul	South Korea
bronze medal	Worapoj Petchkoom	Thailand
bronze medal	Enkhbatyn Badar-Uugan	Mongolia

The men's bantamweight (54 kilograms) event at the 2006 Asian Games took place from 2 to 13 December 2006 at Aspire Hall 5, Doha, Qatar.

== Schedule ==
All times are Arabia Standard Time (UTC+03:00)

Date	Time	Event
Saturday, 2 December 2006	14:00	Qualification
Monday, 4 December 2006	14:00	Preliminary
Friday, 8 December 2006	14:00	Quarterfinals
Monday, 11 December 2006	14:00	Semifinals
Wednesday, 13 December 2006	14:00	Final

== Results ==
Legend

- RSCO — Won by referee stop contest outscored

=== Final ===
Final
Joan Tipon (PHI)	21
Han Soon-chul (KOR)	10

=== Top half ===
Qualification

Preliminary
Adel Chakeri (QAT)	27
Rohollah Mustafa (AFG)	9
Sou Weng Chon (MAC)
Worapoj Petchkoom (THA)	RSCO
Kim Won-guk (PRK)	30
Gu Yu (CHN)	16
Joan Tipon (PHI)	23
Liu Shih-jung (TPE)	10

Quarterfinals
Adel Chakeri (QAT)
Worapoj Petchkoom (THA)	RSCO
Kim Won-guk (PRK)	15
Joan Tipon (PHI)	22

Semifinals
Worapoj Petchkoom (THA)	13
Joan Tipon (PHI)	+13

=== Bottom half ===
Qualification
Manju Wanniarachchi (SRI)	15
Tilek Saparbek Uulu (KGZ)	38
Ibrahim Al-Bishi (KSA)
Orzubek Shayimov (UZB)	RSCO
Ibrahim Al-Gharaghir (JOR)	16
Akhil Kumar (IND)	36

Preliminary
Kanat Abutalipov (KAZ)	27
Han Soon-chul (KOR)	40
Emomali Malaev (TJK)	19
Abid Ali (PAK)	22
Enkhbatyn Badar-Uugan (MGL)	RSCO
Tilek Saparbek Uulu (KGZ)
Orzubek Shayimov (UZB)	RSCO
Akhil Kumar (IND)

Quarterfinals
Han Soon-chul (KOR)	RSCO
Abid Ali (PAK)
Enkhbatyn Badar-Uugan (MGL)	30
Orzubek Shayimov (UZB)	25

Semifinals
Han Soon-chul (KOR)	29
Enkhbatyn Badar-Uugan (MGL)	19
