= Shooting at the 2006 Asian Games – Women's 25 metre pistol team =

Women's 25 metre pistol team at the 2006 Asian Games
- Venue: Lusail Shooting Range
- Dates: 5 December 2006
- Competitors: 45 from 15 nations

Medalists
| gold medal | China; Cao Ying, Chen Ying, Tao Luna |
| silver medal | Japan; Michiko Fukushima, Yoko Inada, Yukari Konishi |
| bronze medal | Mongolia; Otryadyn Gündegmaa, Gantömöriin Kherlentsetseg, Tsogbadrakhyn Mönkhzul |

The women's 25 metre pistol team competition at the 2006 Asian Games in Doha, Qatar was held on 5 December at the Lusail Shooting Range.

== Schedule ==
All times are Arabia Standard Time (UTC+03:00)

| Date | Time | Event |
|---|---|---|
| Tuesday, 5 December 2006 | 08:00 | Final |

== Records ==
Prior to this competition, the existing world, Asian and Games records were as follows.

| World Record | China | 1768 | Busan, South Korea | 4 October 2002 |
| Asian Record | China | 1768 | Busan, South Korea | 4 October 2002 |
| Games Record | China | 1768 | Busan, South Korea | 4 October 2002 |

== Results ==
| Rank | Team | Precision | | | Rapid | | | Total | Notes |
| Rank | Team | 1 | 2 | 3 | 1 | 2 | 3 | Total | Notes |
|---|---|---|---|---|---|---|---|---|---|
| 1st place, gold medalist(s) | China (CHN) | 288 | 294 | 295 | 290 | 295 | 287 | 1749 | |
| | Cao Ying | 96 | 98 | 97 | 96 | 97 | 91 | 575 | |
| | Chen Ying | 96 | 96 | 99 | 99 | 98 | 99 | 587 | |
| | Tao Luna | 96 | 100 | 99 | 95 | 100 | 97 | 587 | |
| 2nd place, silver medalist(s) | Japan (JPN) | 290 | 286 | 289 | 286 | 289 | 289 | 1729 | |
| | Michiko Fukushima | 94 | 94 | 97 | 97 | 99 | 95 | 576 | |
| | Yoko Inada | 98 | 97 | 96 | 96 | 93 | 97 | 577 | |
| | Yukari Konishi | 98 | 95 | 96 | 93 | 97 | 97 | 576 | |
| 3rd place, bronze medalist(s) | Mongolia (MGL) | 280 | 275 | 289 | 288 | 288 | 294 | 1714 | |
| | Otryadyn Gündegmaa | 92 | 95 | 97 | 95 | 99 | 99 | 577 | |
| | Gantömöriin Kherlentsetseg | 93 | 92 | 95 | 96 | 91 | 98 | 565 | |
| | Tsogbadrakhyn Mönkhzul | 95 | 88 | 97 | 97 | 98 | 97 | 572 | |
| 4 | Vietnam (VIE) | 276 | 282 | 285 | 289 | 290 | 292 | 1714 | |
| | Đặng Lê Ngọc Mai | 93 | 90 | 95 | 98 | 98 | 97 | 571 | |
| | Nguyễn Thu Vân | 90 | 96 | 93 | 96 | 98 | 99 | 572 | |
| | Phạm Thị Hà | 93 | 96 | 97 | 95 | 94 | 96 | 571 | |
| 5 | South Korea (KOR) | 286 | 286 | 285 | 280 | 289 | 286 | 1712 | |
| | Boo Soon-hee | 92 | 94 | 94 | 90 | 95 | 93 | 558 | |
| | Choi Kum-ran | 95 | 95 | 92 | 99 | 96 | 99 | 576 | |
| | Kim Byung-hee | 99 | 97 | 99 | 91 | 98 | 94 | 578 | |
| 6 | Malaysia (MAS) | 286 | 283 | 289 | 287 | 279 | 279 | 1703 | |
| | Siti Nur Masitah Badrin | 95 | 97 | 95 | 98 | 95 | 91 | 571 | |
| | Joseline Cheah | 94 | 91 | 96 | 91 | 91 | 92 | 555 | |
| | Bibiana Ng | 97 | 95 | 98 | 98 | 93 | 96 | 577 | |
| 7 | North Korea (PRK) | 288 | 287 | 285 | 270 | 278 | 291 | 1699 | |
| | Kang Un-byol | 96 | 96 | 96 | 89 | 96 | 94 | 567 | |
| | Pak Sol-hwa | 98 | 95 | 94 | 93 | 91 | 99 | 570 | |
| | Ri Hyang-sun | 94 | 96 | 95 | 88 | 91 | 98 | 562 | |
| 8 | Kazakhstan (KAZ) | 280 | 283 | 287 | 279 | 285 | 280 | 1694 | |
| | Zauresh Baibussinova | 96 | 96 | 97 | 97 | 95 | 95 | 576 | |
| | Assel Berkina | 90 | 92 | 93 | 85 | 91 | 90 | 541 | |
| | Yuliya Bondareva | 94 | 95 | 97 | 97 | 99 | 95 | 577 | |
| 9 | Thailand (THA) | 279 | 275 | 290 | 281 | 281 | 283 | 1689 | |
| | Phanchang Chaisaard | 94 | 91 | 99 | 89 | 92 | 93 | 558 | |
| | Chanyanuch Kobkuntnachai | 90 | 92 | 93 | 95 | 95 | 96 | 561 | |
| | Tanyaporn Prucksakorn | 95 | 92 | 98 | 97 | 94 | 94 | 570 | |
| 10 | Kyrgyzstan (KGZ) | 276 | 279 | 284 | 271 | 269 | 278 | 1657 | |
| | Meri Ismailova | 88 | 90 | 96 | 85 | 87 | 90 | 536 | |
| | Elena Travas | 92 | 94 | 93 | 88 | 88 | 91 | 546 | |
| | Zabida Yrsalieva | 96 | 95 | 95 | 98 | 94 | 97 | 575 | |
| 11 | Macau (MAC) | 269 | 270 | 274 | 279 | 282 | 282 | 1656 | |
| | Chan Pou Pou | 92 | 92 | 91 | 92 | 94 | 96 | 557 | |
| | Chong Kuai Iok | 92 | 94 | 91 | 97 | 93 | 95 | 562 | |
| | Iun Hang I | 85 | 84 | 92 | 90 | 95 | 91 | 537 | |
| 12 | Iran (IRI) | 265 | 283 | 277 | 254 | 267 | 253 | 1599 | |
| | Shokoufeh Akasheh | 90 | 94 | 94 | 73 | 79 | 69 | 499 | |
| | Nasim Hassanpour | 95 | 97 | 90 | 93 | 96 | 93 | 564 | |
| | Marzieh Mehrabi | 80 | 92 | 93 | 88 | 92 | 91 | 536 | |
| 13 | Qatar (QAT) | 256 | 267 | 264 | 257 | 253 | 273 | 1570 | |
| | Souad Al-Khater | 93 | 94 | 90 | 91 | 93 | 95 | 556 | |
| | Hana Al-Mohammed | 73 | 84 | 81 | 74 | 78 | 84 | 474 | |
| | Hanadi Salem | 90 | 89 | 93 | 92 | 82 | 94 | 540 | |
| 14 | Bahrain (BRN) | 243 | 257 | 245 | 222 | 244 | 245 | 1456 | |
| | Afrah Ajaj | 80 | 79 | 66 | 82 | 81 | 88 | 476 | |
| | Noora Ajoor | 77 | 82 | 85 | 64 | 79 | 76 | 463 | |
| | Naheed Mohamed | 86 | 96 | 94 | 76 | 84 | 81 | 517 | |
| 15 | Maldives (MDV) | 223 | 233 | 238 | 159 | 154 | 161 | 1168 | |
| | Ramziyya Abdulla | 75 | 69 | 79 | 70 | 60 | 69 | 422 | |
| | Fathimath Azima | 56 | 73 | 70 | | | | 199 | |
| | Aishath Zeena | 92 | 91 | 89 | 89 | 94 | 92 | 547 | |
