= Soft tennis at the 1990 Asian Games =

- Venue: Beijing International Tennis Center
- Dates: 24–30 September 1990

Soft tennis was contested as a demonstration sport at the 1990 Asian Games. The competition took place from 24 to 30 September 1990. All events were held at the Beijing International Tennis Center in Beijing, China.

Japan topped the medal table winning two gold medals.

== Medalists ==
Event	Gold	Silver	Bronze
Men's doubles	Japan; Akihiro Uematsu; Motoji Ohashi	South Korea; Jang Han-sub; Lee Suk-woo	South Korea; Kim Sung-soo; Chang Bong-hoon
Men's doubles	Japan; Akihiro Uematsu; Motoji Ohashi	South Korea; Jang Han-sub; Lee Suk-woo	Japan; Hiromi Tsunori; Ichiro Uchida
Men's team	Chinese Taipei	Japan	South Korea
Men's team	Chinese Taipei	Japan	China
Women's doubles	South Korea; Oh Mi-sun; Lee Ahn-sun	Japan; Kayo Tokunaga; Izumi Kobayashi	Japan; Reiko Sahashi; Chiharu Sadamoto
Women's doubles	South Korea; Oh Mi-sun; Lee Ahn-sun	Japan; Kayo Tokunaga; Izumi Kobayashi	Japan; Mayumi Munemori; Ritsuko Shiozaki
Women's team	Japan	South Korea	China
Women's team	Japan	South Korea	Chinese Taipei

== Medal table ==
Rank	Nation	Gold	Silver	Bronze	Total
1	Japan (JPN)	2	2	3	7
2	South Korea (KOR)	1	2	2	5
3	Chinese Taipei (TPE)	1	0	1	2
4	China (CHN)	0	0	2	2
Totals (4 entries)		4	4	8	16

== Results ==
=== Men's team ===
==== Preliminary round ====
===== Group A =====
Pos	Team	Pld	W	L	MF	MA	MD	KOR	CHN	PHI	NEP
1	South Korea	3	3	0	9	0	+9	—	3–0	3–0	3–0
2	China	3	2	1	6	3	+3	0–3	—	3–0	3–0
3	Philippines	3	1	2	3	6	−3	0–3	0–3	—	3–0
4	Nepal	3	0	3	0	9	−9	0–3	0–3	0–3	—

Source: Results

===== Group B =====
Pos	Team	Pld	W	L	MF	MA	MD	JPN	TPE	THA	SIN
1	Japan	3	3	0	8	1	+7	—	2–1	3–0	3–0
2	Chinese Taipei	3	2	1	7	2	+5	1–2	—	3–0	3–0
3	Thailand	3	1	2	2	7	−5	0–3	0–3	—	2–1
4	Singapore	3	0	3	1	8	−7	0–3	0–3	1–2	—

Source: Results

==== Knockout round ====
Semifinals		Final
South Korea	1
Chinese Taipei	2	Chinese Taipei	3
Japan	3	Japan	0
China	0

=== Women's team ===
==== Preliminary round ====
===== Group A =====
Pos	Team	Pld	W	L	MF	MA	MD	JPN	TPE	SIN
1	Japan	2	2	0	6	0	+6	—	3–0	3–0
2	Chinese Taipei	2	1	1	3	3	0	0–3	—	3–0
3	Singapore	2	0	2	0	6	−6	0–3	0–3	—

Source: Results

===== Group B =====
Pos	Team	Pld	W	L	MF	MA	MD	KOR	CHN	THA	MAL
1	South Korea	3	3	0	9	0	+9	—	3–0	3–0	3–0
2	China	3	2	1	6	3	+3	0–3	—	3–0	3–0
3	Thailand	3	1	2	3	6	−3	0–3	0–3	—	3–0
4	Malaysia	3	0	3	0	9	−9	0–3	0–3	0–3	—

Source: Results

==== Knockout round ====
Semifinals		Final
Japan	3
China	0	Japan	2
South Korea	3	South Korea	1
Chinese Taipei	0
