= Mongolia at the 2006 Asian Games =

- IOC code: MGL
- NOC: Mongolian National Olympic Committee

in Doha
- Flag bearer: Khashbaataryn Tsagaanbaatar
- Medals Ranked 21st: Gold 2 Silver 5 Bronze 8 Total 15

Asian Games appearances (overview)
- 1974; 1978; 1982; 1986; 1990; 1994; 1998; 2002; 2006; 2010; 2014; 2018; 2022; 2026

Mongolia participated in the 15th Asian Games, officially known as the XV Asiad held in Doha, Qatar from December 1 to December 15, 2006. Mongolia ranked 21st with two gold medals in this edition of the Asiad.

== Medal summary ==
=== Medals by sport ===
| Sport | Gold | Silver | Bronze | Total |
|---|---|---|---|---|
| Boxing | | 2 | 1 | 3 |
| Judo | 2 | 3 | 1 | 6 |
| Shooting | | | 1 | 1 |
| Wrestling | | | 5 | 5 |
| Total | 2 | 5 | 8 | 15 |

=== Medalists ===
| Medal | Athlete | Sport | Event | Date |
|---|---|---|---|---|
| Gold | Damdinsürengiin Nyamkhüü | Judo | Men's 81 kg | 3 |
| Gold | Khashbaataryn Tsagaanbaatar | Judo | Men's 66 kg | 4 |
| Silver | Dorjgotovyn Tserenkhand | Judo | Women's + 78 kg | 2 |
| Silver | Mönkhbaataryn Bundmaa | Judo | Women's 52 kg | 4 |
| Silver | Dorjgotovyn Tserenkhand | Judo | Women's openweight | 5 |
| Silver | Zorigtbaataryn Enkhzorig | Boxing | Men's 57 kg | 12 |
| Silver | Uranchimegiin Mönkh-Erdene | Boxing | Men's 60 kg | 13 |
| Bronze | Pürevjargalyn Lkhamdegd | Judo | Women's 78 kg | 2 |
| Bronze | Otryadyn Gündegmaa; Gantömöriin Kherlentsetseg; Tsogbadrakhyn Mönkhzul | Shooting | Women's 25 metre pistol team | 5 |
| Bronze | Tsogtbazaryn Enkhjargal | Wrestling | Women's freestyle 48 kg | 11 |
| Bronze | Naidangiin Otgonjargal | Wrestling | Women's freestyle 55 kg | 11 |
| Bronze | Badrakhyn Odonchimeg | Wrestling | Women's freestyle 63 kg | 11 |
| Bronze | Ochirbatyn Burmaa | Wrestling | Women's freestyle 72 kg | 11 |
| Bronze | Enkhbatyn Badar-Uugan | Boxing | Men's 54 kg | 13 |
| Bronze | Buyanjavyn Batzorig | Wrestling | Men's freestyle 66 kg | 14 |
