= Khalifa International Tennis and Squash Complex =

Tennis and squash complex in Doha, Qatar

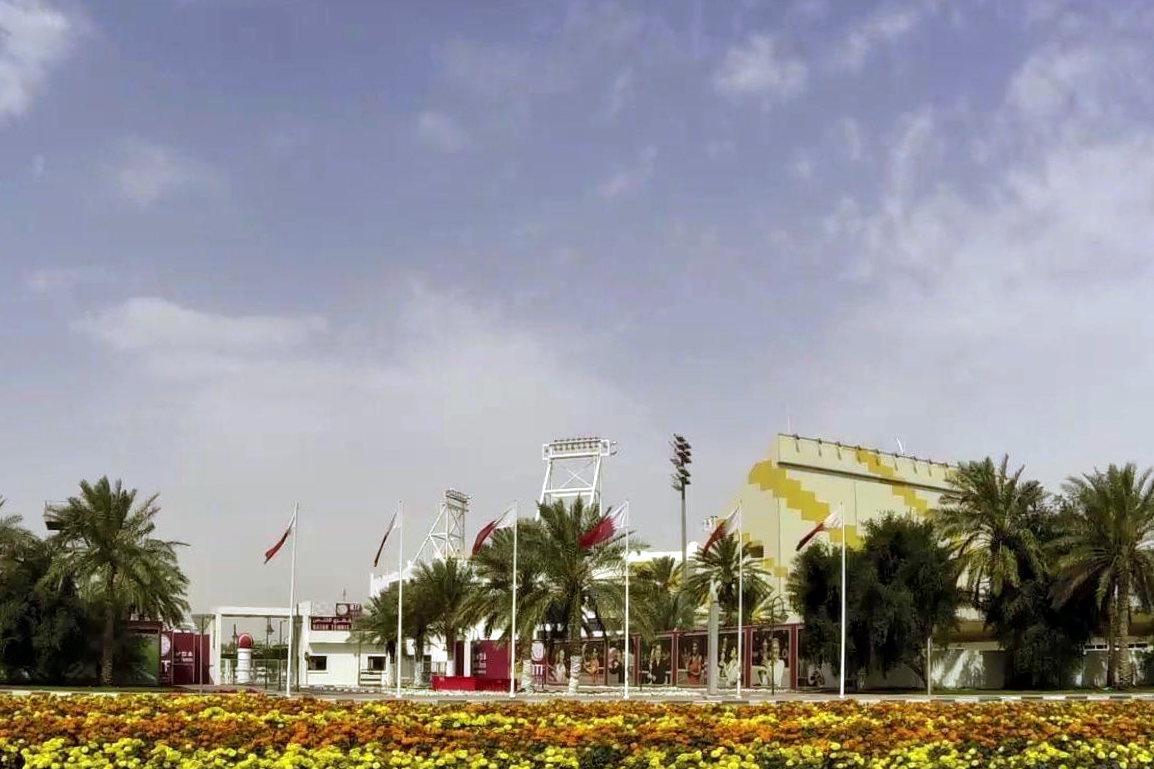
- Interactive map of Khalifa International Tennis and Squash Complex
- Location: Doha, Qatar
- Coordinates: 25°18′44.56″N 51°30′52.02″E
- Owner: Qatar Tennis Federation
- Capacity: 7,000 (2008–present); 4,500 (1992–2007)
- Surface: Hard, outdoors

Construction
- Opened: 16 December 1992
- Expanded: 2008
- Architects: Nussli Group (expanded 2008)

Tenants
- Qatar ExxonMobil Open (tennis) (1993–present); Qatar Total Open (tennis) (2001–2008, 2011–); WTA Tour Championships (tennis) (2008–2010); Asian Games (tennis) (2006); Pan Arab Games (tennis) (2011)

The Khalifa International Tennis and Squash Complex (Arabic: مجمع خليفة الدولي للتنس والاسكواش) is a tennis and squash complex in Doha, Qatar. The center is owned and operated by the Qatar Tennis Federation. It is the home venue of the ATP World Tour's Qatar ExxonMobil Open and WTA event Qatar Total Open. It formerly hosted the year-ending WTA Tour Championships in 2008–2010. It has also hosted the tennis and squash competitions at the 2006 Asian Games, as well as Padel World Championship in 2021 and 2024.

== History ==
Professional tennis in Qatar started with exhibition tournaments featuring distinguished players. Due to the success of these games, it was decided that an official organization should be created for the same. On 9 April 1984, the Qatar Tennis Federation was established. In 1987 tennis was introduced to major sports clubs in Qatar. Games were held at four major sports clubs – Al Arabi, Al Saad, Al Ahli, and Al Rayyan.

In 1991 facilities at the Qatar Tennis Federation had increased including the number of tennis courts and on 16 December 1992 this new complex was inaugurated. The complex was recently built the Phase III which was a major upgrade for the complex.

During the 2006 Asian Games, the tennis, squash and soft tennis matches were held here. For the occasion, eight additional training courts and four squash venues were constructed.

== Location ==
The facility is located adjacent to the Qatar Sports club and Doha compound in the Al Dafna area of Doha. It sits on one end of the West Bay district at the intersection of the Majilis Al Taawon and Al Markhiya streets.

It is within walking distance of major hotels and commercial establishments in the district. Several food chains like Fuddruckers and Burger king also have branches with in or around the complex.

== Expansion and facilities ==
The stadium had an initial capacity of 4500 seats. It was renovated and enlarged in 2008 increasing its seating capacity to 7000. Additional areas introduced corporate boxes, lower, middle and upper sections. A media center and sponsor booths are also incorporated.

To cater to local needs, a VIP and a general public area with food courts and entertainment were gradually introduced. The complex has 24 courts and all the necessary facilities to host major tennis tournaments in the world.

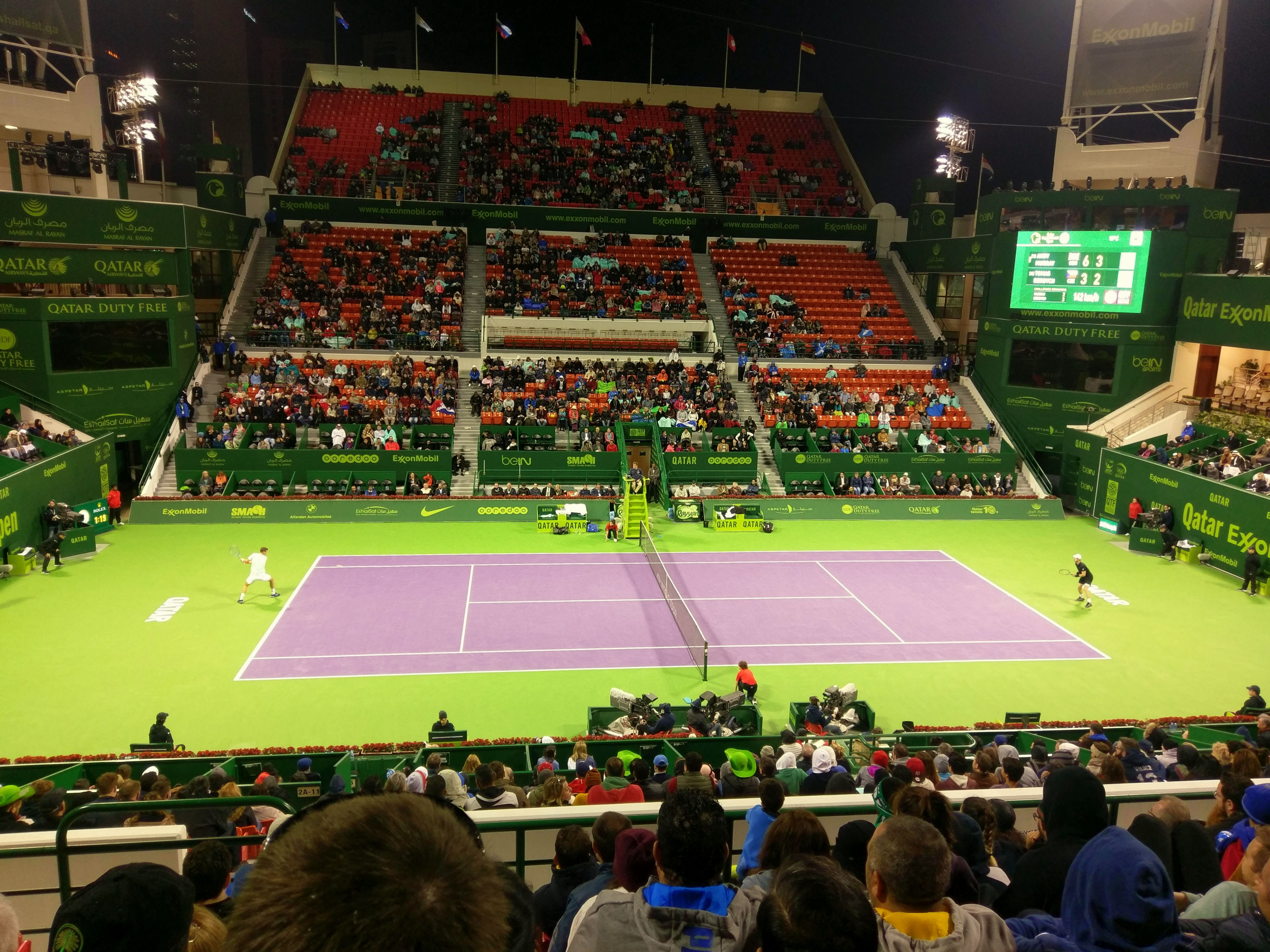
A view of the main center court Tennis court of the complex.

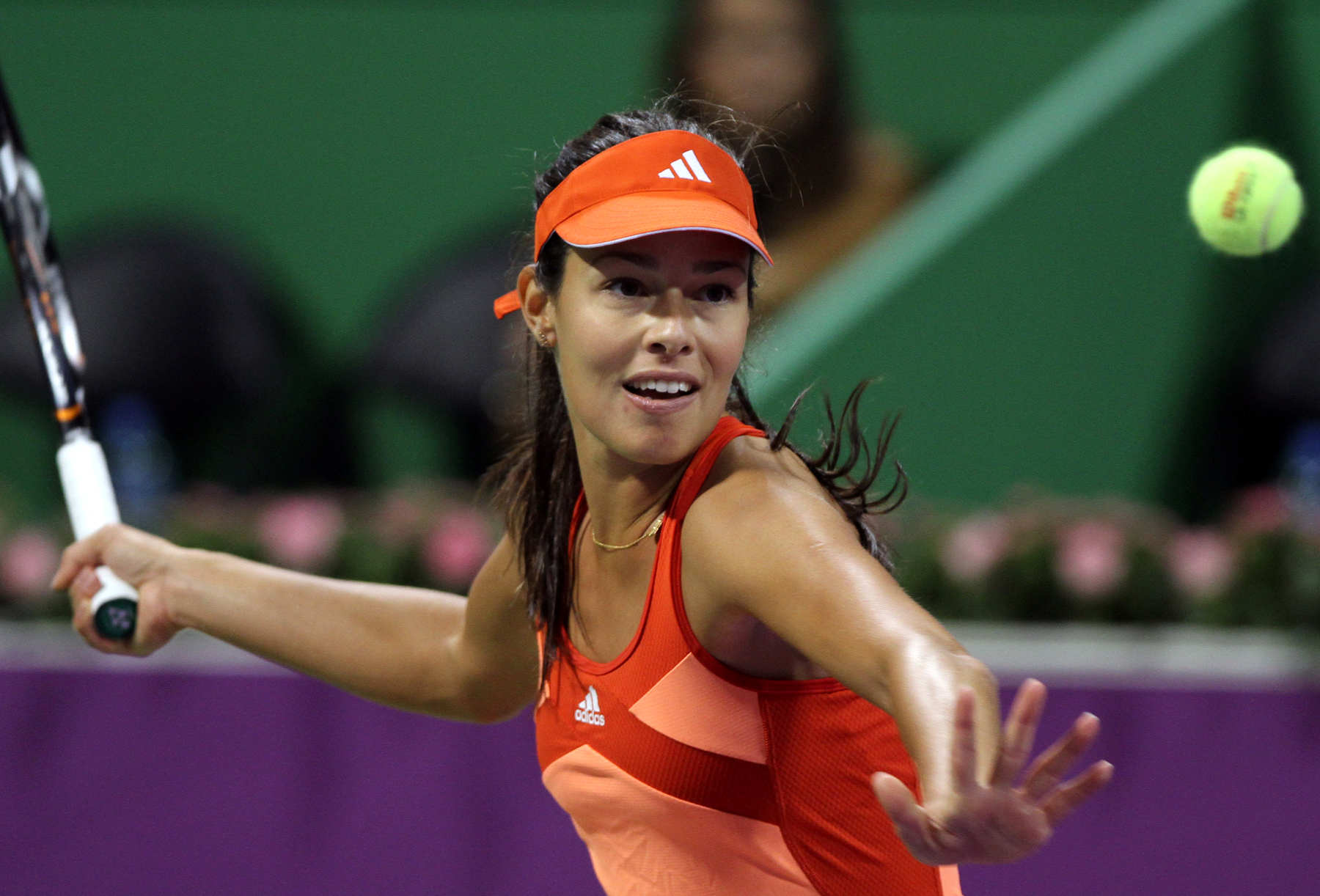
Ana Ivanovic at the Qatar Open.

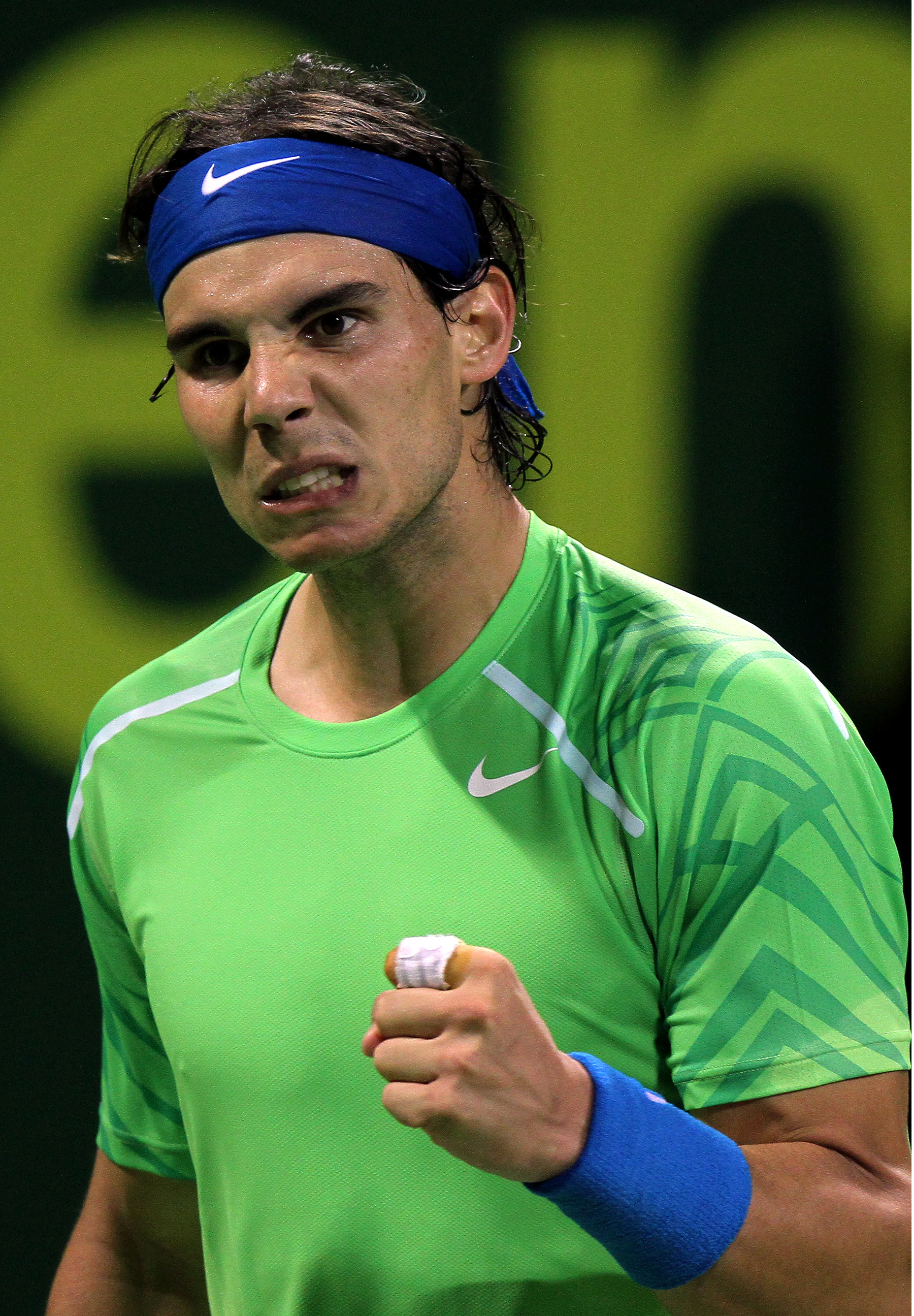
Rafael Nadal at the complex during one of the games.

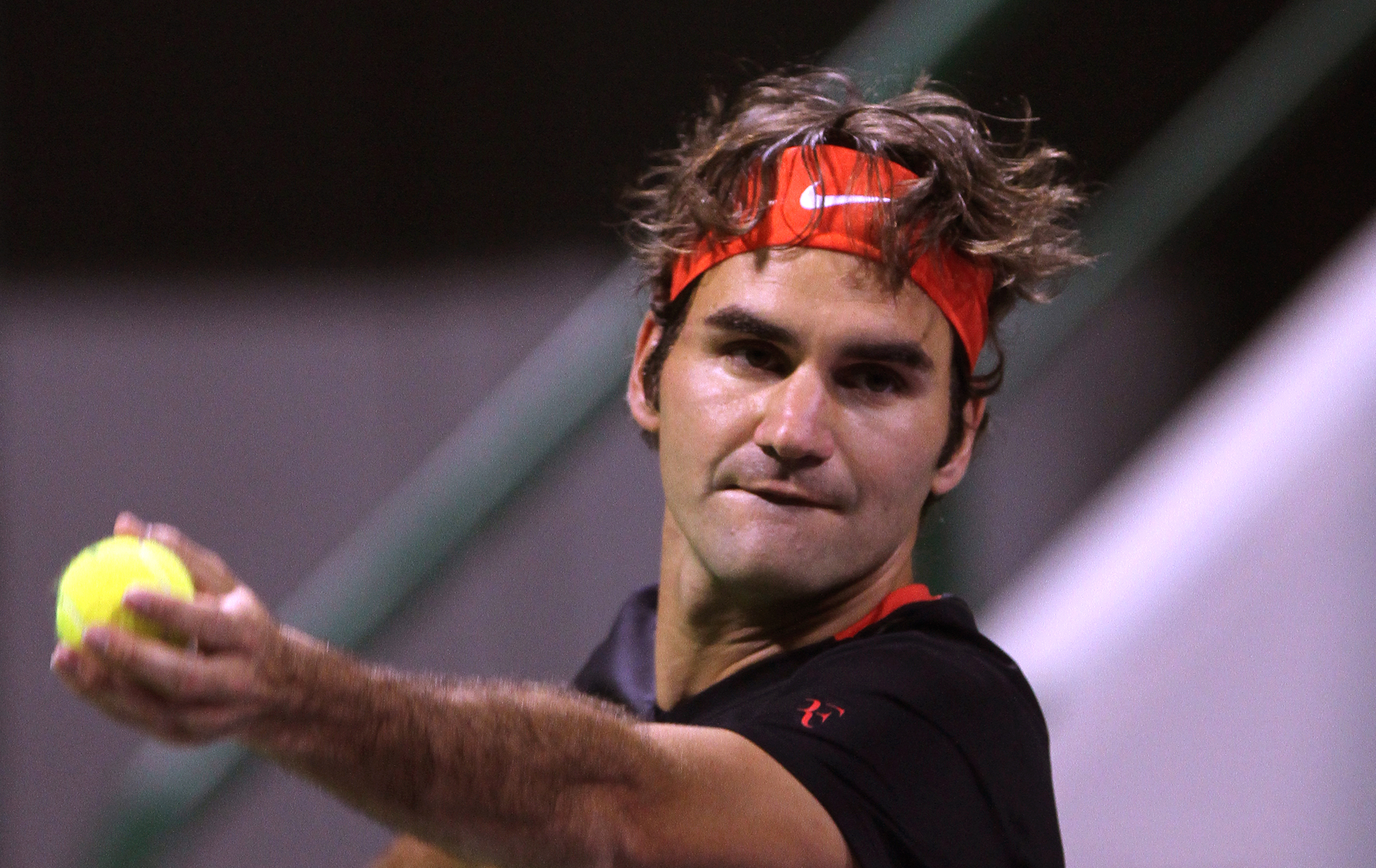
Roger Federer swings to take a shot in Doha.

== See also ==
- List of tennis stadiums by capacity

Preceded by Madrid Arena; Madrid	WTA Year-end Championships; Venue; 2008–2010	Succeeded by Sinan Erdem Dome; Istanbul
