= Chinese Taipei at the 2006 Asian Games =

- IOC code: TPE
- NOC: Chinese Taipei Olympic Committee

in Doha
- Competitors: 399
- Medals Ranked 10th: Gold 9 Silver 10 Bronze 27 Total 46

Asian Games appearances (overview)
- 1954; 1958; 1962; 1966; 1970; 1974–1986; 1990; 1994; 1998; 2002; 2006; 2010; 2014; 2018; 2022; 2026

Flag of the Republic of China

Chinese Taipei (simplified Chinese: 中华台北; traditional Chinese: 中華臺北; pinyin: Zhōnghuá Táiběi) competed in the 2006 Asian Games in Doha, Qatar, in November and December 2006. The Chinese Taipei team sent 399 athletes to the games, making Chinese Taipei the fourth largest delegation after China, Japan, and South Korea. Despite Taiwan's small size, Chinese Taipei is a second-rank Asian sports power, finishing tenth in gold medals and seventh in overall medals at the 2006 Asian Games, a slight drop from its performance in the 2002 Asian Games in Busan, South Korea.

== Medals ==
Rank	Sport	Gold	Silver	Bronze	Total
1	Soft Tennis	3	1	1	5
2	Cue Sports	2	0	2	4
3	Taekwondo	1	2	4	7
4	Tennis	1	1	2	4
5	Karate	1	0	3	4
6	Baseball	1	0	0	1
7	Archery	0	1	2	3
7	Golf	0	1	2	3
9	Basketball	0	1	0	1
9	Cycling	0	1	0	1
9	Equestrian	0	1	0	1
9	Softball	0	1	0	1
13	Athletics (Track and Field)	0	0	3	3
13	Table Tennis	0	0	3	3
15	Shooting	0	0	2	2
16	Judo	0	0	1	1
16	Volleyball	0	0	1	1
16	Weightlifting	0	0	1	1
Totals (18 entries)		9	10	27	46

Taiwan finishes tenth in the medal table and eighth in overall medals.

== Archery ==
Men

Qualification Round

Archer	Place	December 9		December 10		10s	Xs	Score
Archer	Place	90M	70M	50M	30M	10s	Xs	Score
Kuo Cheng Wei	6th	294 / 8	328 / 4	337 / 5	348 / 21	61	33	1307
Chen Szu Yuan	13th	289 / 10	319 / 13	331 / 11	346 / 25	55	23	1285
Wang Cheng Pang	14th	283 / 15	319 / 14	329 / 15	352 / 8	64	27	1283
Hsu Tzu Yi	19th	283 / 15	309 / 26	329 / 19	349 / 16	53	22	1270

Team: Qualified as the second seed

- Quarterfinals December 13: v. Kazakhstan - Win 223–214
- Semifinals December 13: v. India - Win 220–210
- Gold Medal Match December 13: v. South Korea - Loss 211–216
  - Won Silver Medal

Chen Szu Yuan: Qualified as the 10th seed

- Round of 32 December 12: v. (Bhutan) Tashi Peljor Win 102–91
- Round of 16 December 12: v. (Indonesia) Rahmat Sulistyawan Loss 102-102 (shoot-off 8–9)

Kuo Cheng Wei: Qualified as the fourth seed

- Round of 32 December 12: v. (Hong Kong) Chan Kam Shing Win 102–88
- Round of 16 December 12: v. (Philippines) Marvin Cordero Win 106–97
- Quarterfinals December 12: v. (Malaysia) Cheng Chu Sian Win 114–108
- Semifinals December 12: v. (South Korea) Im Dong Hyun Loss 100–106
- Bronze Medal Match December 12: v. (Indonesia) Rahmat Sulistyawan Win 109–100

Women's

Qualification Round

Archer	Place	December 9		December 10		10s	Xs	Score
Archer	Place	70M	60M	50M	30M	10s	Xs	Score
Yuan Shu Chi	10th	307 / 15	326 / 6	313 / 20	348 / 6	53	19	1294
Wu Hui Ju	17th	309 / 12	314 / 18	317 / 12	346 / 10	49	13	1286
Lin Hua Shan	22nd	294 / 23	311 / 23	310 / 24	337 / 33	35	12	1252
Lai Yi Hsin	24th	297 / 21	307 / 27	317 / 11	327 / 44	40	9	1248

Team: qualified as the fourth seed

- Round of 16 December 13: v. Mongolia Win 202–166
- Quarterfinals December 13: v. Indonesia Win 207–187
- Semifinals December 13: v. South Korea Loss 196–211
- Bronze Medal Match December 13: v. (North Korea) DPR Korea Win 208–206

Wu Hui Ju: Qualified as the 12th seed

- Round of 32 December 11: (Bhutan) Dorji Dema Win 103–95
- Round of 16 December 11: (China) Zhang Juanjuan Loss 101–109

Yuan Shi Chi: Qualified as the seventh seed

- Round of 32 December 11: (Mongolia) Urantungalag Bishindee Lost 103–107

== Athletics ==
Men

Chang Chia Che

- Marathon
  - Final December 10 - 2:23:50; 10th place

Chang Ming Huang

- Shot Put
  - Final December 11–19.45 meters; Bronze Medal

Chao Chih Chien

- Long Jump
  - Qualification December 8 - 7.39m; 9th place (failed to qualify for final)

Chen Chin Hsuan

- 400 Meters
  - First Round, Heat 3, December 8 - 47.92; 3rd place (did not advance)

Chen Fu Pin

- 800 Meters
  - Heats, Heat 1, December 9 - 1:54.66; 7th place (did not advance)
- 1500 Meters,
  - Heats, Heat 1, December 8 - 3:49.85; 7th place (advanced to final)
  - Final, December 10 - 3:52.72; 11th place

Chung Chen Kang

- 400 Meters
  - First Round, Heat 1, December 8 - 48.00; 5th place (did not advance)

Hsiao Szu Pin

- Decathlon, December 10 and 11

Athlete	Rank	December 10					December 11					Total Score
Athlete	Rank	100 Meters	Long Jump	Shot Put	High Jump	400 Meters	110m Hurdles	Discus	Pole Vault	Javelin	1500 Meter	Total Score
Hsiao Szu Pin	9th	11.13; 832	7.08; 833	13.55; 701	2.00; 803	51.25; 758	15.46; 795	42.27; 711	NM; 0	55.36; 668	5:19.84; 451	6552

Liu Yuan Kai

- 100 meters
  - Round 1 - Heat 3 December 8–10.68; 3rd place (advance to semifinals)
  - Semifinal - Heat 1 December 9–10.57; 6th place (did not advance)

Wu Wen Chien

- 3000m Steeplechase
  - Final December 8–9:12.31; 8th place

Yi Wei Chen

- 200 meters
  - Round 1 - Heat 1 December 9–21.71; 5th place (did not advance)

400 Meter (4x100 Meter) Relay

- Liu Chih Hung, Liu Yuan Kai, Yi Wei Chen, Tsai Meng Lin
  - Heats - Heat 1 December 11–39.93; 3rd place (advance to final)
  - Final December 12–39.99; 4th place

1600 Meter (4x400 Meter) Relay

- Chung Chen Kang, Chen Chin Hsuan, Yi Wei Chen, Chang Chi Sheng
  - Final December 12 - 3:12.03; 6th place

Women

Chuang Shu Chuan

- 100 Meters
  - Heats, Heat 3 December 8–11.95; 4th place (did not advance)

Lin Chia Ying

- Shot Put,
  - Final December 9–16.70m; Bronze Medal

Lin Yin Chun

- 100 Meters
  - Heats, Heat 1 December 8–12.11; 4th place (did not advance)

400 Meter (4x100 Meter) Relay

- Lin Yi-chun, Chuang Shu-chuan, Chen Ying Ru, Yu Sheue An
  - Final December 12 - 45.86; Bronze Medal

== Badminton ==
Women's

Singles

- Pai Min Jie
  - Round of 32: December 5 v. (South Korea) Hwang Hye-youn - Loss (0–2) 8-21, 11–21
- Cheng Shao-chieh
  - Round of 32: December 5 v. (Singapore) Li Li - Loss (1–2) 11–21, 21–18, 15–21

Doubles

- Chien Yu Chin & Cheng Wen-Hsing
  - Round of 16 December 7 v. (Japan) Kumiko Ogura & Reiko Shiota - Loss 0–2; 17–21, 19–21
- Chou Chia Chi & Ku Pei Ting
  - Round of 32 December 6 v. (Japan) Satoko Suetsuna & Miyuki Maeda - Loss 0–2; 18–21, 12–21

Team

The Taiwanese women were drawn with Japan and Korea for opening round group play.

- December 2 (09:00) v. Japan - Lost 1–4
- December 2 (17:00) v. (South Korea) Korea - Lost 0–3

Team	Pts	Pld	W	L	GF	GA
Japan	4	2	2	0	7	3
(South Korea) Korea	3	2	1	1	5	3
Chinese Taipei	2	2	0	2	1	7

Mixed doubles

- Tsai Chia-Hsin and Cheng Wen-Hsing
  - Round of 16: December 6 v. Lee Jae Jin & Lee Hyo-jung: Loss 0–2; 16–21, 21–23

== Baseball ==
The Taiwanese competed with Japan, South Korea, Philippines, Thailand, and China in a round robin baseball competition. There is no medal round, so medals were determined based upon round robin results. The Taiwanese came from behind in the ninth inning to defeat the Japanese in the final round robin game to win the gold medal.

- November 30 - v. South Korea Win 4–2
- December 2 - v. Thailand Win 16-0 (5 innings)
- December 4 - v. China Win 4–2
- December 5 - v. Philippines Win 15–0
- December 7 - v. Japan Win 8–7

Table

Rank	NOC	W	L	Pct.	RS	RA	DI	RA/9DI
1	Chinese Taipei	5	0	1.000	47	11	37	2.68
2	Japan	4	1	.800	56	17	36.1	4.24
3	South Korea	3	2	.600	45	19	39.1	4.35
4	China	2	3	.400	23	37	34.1	9.70
5	Thailand	1	4	.200	10	39	39	9.00
6	Philippines	0	5	.000	9	67	31.1	19.25

== Basketball ==
The Taiwanese sent both a men's and women's team to the 2006 Asian Games.

Men

The men automatically advance to the second round and will play in group F with China, Lebanon, Japan. Uzbekistan and Kazakhstan qualified in from round one.

- December 2 v. Japan - Loss 75–85
- December 4 v. Kazakhstan - Win 81–79
- December 6 v. China - Loss 65–101
- December 8 v. Lebanon - Win 86–72
- December 10 v. Uzbekistan - Win 106–69

Team	Pts	Pld	W	L	PF	PA	Diff
China	10	5	5	0	450	351	+99
Japan	8	5	3	2	378	369	+9
Kazakhstan	8	5	3	2	413	394	+19
Chinese Taipei	8	5	3	2	413	406	+7
Lebanon	6	5	1	4	393	389	+4
Uzbekistan	5	5	0	5	340	478	−138

- Quarterfinal: December 12 v. Qatar - Loss 96-103 (2 OT)
- Classification: December 13 v. Japan - Loss 67–78
- Seventh Place: December 14 v. Kazakhstan - Loss 74–100
  - Finished in Eighth Place

Women

The women will play their first round in group Y with South Korea, Thailand, and Kazakhstan.

- December 5 - v. South Korea - Win 80–73
- December 7 - v. Thailand - Win 102–73

Team	Pts	Pld	W	L	PF	PA	Diff
Chinese Taipei	4	2	2	0	182	146	+36
South Korea	3	2	1	1	168	117	+51
Thailand	2	1	0	2	110	197	−87

- Semifinal - December 11 v. Japan - Win 70–59
- Gold Medal Game - December 14 v. China - Loss 59–90
  - Won Silver Medal

== Bodybuilding ==
Chen Jung Sheng

- 60 Kilogram class
  - Prejudging December 8–30 points; 6th place (did not advance)

Hsu Chia Hao

- 90+ Kilogram class
  - Prejudging December 9–39 points; 8th place (did not advance)

== Bowling ==
=== Men's ===
Rk	Name	NOC	G1	G2	G3	G4	G5	G6	Tot
7	Cheng Chao Sheng	(Chinese Taipei)	244	216	193	238	224	234	1,349

Rk	Name	NOC	G1	G2	G3	G4	G5	G6	Tot	Grand Total
29	Hsieh Yu Ping; Wang Tien Fu	(Chinese Taipei)	203; 211	215; 211	204; 217	225; 246	238; 181	156; 191	1241; 1257	2498
39	Cheng Fang Yu; Chen Yung Chuan	(Chinese Taipei)	191; 169	203; 169	259; 190	216; 201	167; 222	265; 184	1301; 1135	2436
41	Cheng Chao Sheng; Kao Hai Yuan	(Chinese Taipei)	212; 192	204; 193	232; 212	191; 205	168; 226	233; 151	1240; 1179	2419

Rk	Name	NOC	G1	G2	G3	G4	G5	G6	Tot	Grand Total
12	Cheng Chao Sheng; Hsieh Yu Ping; Wang Tien Fu	(Chinese Taipei)	181; 183; 211	212; 223; 245	238; 212; 211	235; 237; 203	200; 197; 194	164; 231; 210	1230; 1283; 1274	3787
16	Chen Yung Chuan; Cheng Fang Yu; Kao Hai Yuan	(Chinese Taipei)	178; 190; 203	190; 177; 216	189; 205; 237	200; 233; 182	206; 244; 195	206; 235; 193	1169; 1314; 1226	3709

=== Women's ===
Rk	Name	NOC	G1	G2	G3	G4	G5	G6	Tot	Grand Total
9	Chien Hsiu Lan; Tsai Hsin Yi; Chou Miao Lin	(Chinese Taipei)	180; 177; 235	198; 212; 202	204; 204; 211	217; 180; 194	190; 169; 211	231; 204; 199	1236; 1146; 1232	3598
13	Chu Yu Chieh; Pan Yu Fen; Wang Yu Ling	(Chinese Taipei)	197; 202; 203	184; 186; 167	220; 222; 205	194; 176; 147	205; 203; 197	192; 193; 167	1192; 1182; 1086	3598

== Boxing ==
=== Standing ===
Rank		Gold	Silver	Bronze	Total
15	Chinese Taipei	0	0	0	0

=== Results ===
- Venue: ASPIRE Hall 5

Qualification bouts
December 2, 2006
Weight division	Corner-Name(NOC)	Winner	Points	Time/Decision
Featherweight	RED (Chinese Taipei) CHUNG Chun An (TPE); BLUE (Tajikistan) KARIMOV Bahodur (TJK)	RED	23:11	PTS
Light Welterweight	BLUE (Chinese Taipei) TSAI Yao Chun (TPE); RED (Saudi Arabia) HADADI Mabkhot Yahya (KSA)	BLUE	42:30	PTS
Preliminary bouts
December 3, 2006
Featherweight	BLUE (Chinese Taipei) CHUNG Chun An (TPE); RED (Thailand) ADI Sailom (THA)	BLUE	28:11	PTS
December 4, 2006
Bantamweight	BLUE (Chinese Taipei) LIU Shih Jung (TPE); RED (Philippines) TIPON Joan (PHI)	RED	10:23	PTS
December 5, 2006
Light Welterweight	RED (Chinese Taipei) TSAI Yao Chun (TPE); BLUE (India) KUMAR Manoj (IND)	BLUE	25:10	PTS
Heavyweight	BLUE (Chinese Taipei) TSAI Li Teh (TPE); RED (India) SINGH Harpreet (IND)	RED	13:25	PTS
Quarterfinals
December 7, 2006
Featherweight	BLUE (Chinese Taipei) CHUNG Chun An (TPE); RED (Mongolia) ZORIGTBAATAR Enkhzorig	RED	25:28	PTS

Legend:
PTS - Points

== Cue sports ==
Men

Singles

Chang Chien Wen

Carom Three-Cushion

- December 7 Round of 16 v. (South Korea) Kim Kyung Roul - Loss 27–40

Huang Kun Chang

Eight-Ball

- December 8 Round of 32 v. (Japan) Yukio Akagariyama - Win 9–3
- December 8 Round of 16 v. (Malaysia) Ooi Fook Yuen - Win 9–7
- December 8 Quarterfinal v. (China) Xu Meng - Win 9–7
- December 9 Semifinal v. (Philippines) Antonio Gabica - Loss 7–9
- December 9 Bronze Medal Match v. (Philippines) Leonardo Andam - Win 9–5

Ku Chih Wei

Snooker

- December 6 Round of 32 v. (Thailand) Atthasit Mahitthi - Loss 2–4

Lee Po Hsien

Snooker

- December 6 Round of 32 v. (Vietnam) Do Hoang Quan - Loss 2–4

Wu Chia Ching

8-Ball

- December 8 Round of 32 v. (South Korea) Ham Won Sik - Win 9–7
- December 8 Round of 16 v. (Malaysia) Ibrahim Amir - Loss 8–9

9-Ball

- December 10 Round of 32 v. (Hong Kong) Lee Chen Man - Win 11–4
- December 10 Round of 16 v. (India) Sumit Talwar - Win 11–1
- December 11 Quarterfinal v. (South Korea) Jeoung Young Hwa - Loss 9–11

Yang Ching Shun

9-Ball

- December 9 Round of 32 v. (Singapore) Toh Lian Han - Win 11–9
- December 10 Round of 16 v. (Vietnam) Lương Chí Dũng - Win 11–5
- December 11 Quarterfinal v. (South Korea) Lee Gun Jae - Win 11–10
- December 11 Semifinal v. (Philippines) Jeff De Luna - Loss 7–11
- December 11 Bronze Medal Match v. (South Korea) Jeoung Young Hwa - Win 11–7

Yuan Yung Kuo

Carom Three-Cushion - Singles

- December 7 Round of 16 v. (Thailand) Thawat Sujaritthurakarn - Win 40–4
- December 8 Quarterfinal v. (Japan) Ryuji Umeda - Loss 27–40

Snooker - Doubles

Ku Chih Wei & Lee Po Hsien

- December 4 Round of 16 v. (Qatar) Mohsen Bukshaisha & Ahmed Saif - Loss 2–3

Snooker - Team

Ku Chih Wei & Lee Po Hsien

- December 5 Round of 32 v. (Vietnam) Do Hoang Quan & Lương Chí Dũng - Loss 1–3

Women

Lin Yuan Chun

8-ball singles

- Round of 16 - December 8 v. (Japan) Miyuki Fuke - Win 7–6
- Quarterfinal - December 8 v. (South Korea) Cha You Ram - Win 7–6
- Semifinal - December 9 v. (China) Pan Xiaoting - Win 7–5
- Gold Medal Match - December 9 v. (South Korea) Kim Ga Young - Win 7–6

Liu Shin Mei

8-ball singles

- Round of 16 - December 8 v. (Malaysia) Esther Kwan Suet Yee - Win 7–2
- Quarterfinal - December 8 v. (South Korea) Kim Ga Young - Loss 4–7

9-ball singles

- Round of 32 - December 9 v. (Syria) Nada Abd Alla - Win 7–0
- Round of 16 - December 9 v. (India) Vidya Pillai - Win 7–6
- Quarterfinal - December 10 v. (Malaysia) Suhana Dewi Sabtu - Win 7–2
- Semifinal - December 11 v, (China) Pan Xiaoting - Win 7–3
- Gold Medal Match - December 11 v. (Malaysia) Esther Kwan Suet Yee - Win 7–3

Tan Hsiang Lin

9-ball singles

- Round of 32 - December 9 v. (South Korea) Kim Ga Young - Win 7–4
- Round of 16 - December 9 v. (Thailand) Vuthiphan Kongkaket - Win 7–4
- Quarterfinal - December 10 v. (Philippines) Iris Ranola - Loss 6–7

== Cycling ==
Road

Men

December 3 Individual Road Race

- Chen Keng Hsien - 4:02.16, 18th place
- Wu Po Hung - DNF

Women

December 4 Individual Road Race

- I Fang Ju - 3:07.38, 12th place

December 5 Individual Time Trial

- Huang Ho Hsun - 36:02.05, 8th place

Track

Men

Chen Keng Hsien

- 15 km Points Race - December 12 Heat 1 - 13 points; 7th place (advance to final)
- 40 km Points Race - December 13 Final - −35; Did not finish

Huang Hsin Hua

4km Individual Pursuit

- Qualifications December 9: 4:44.112; 10th place (did not advance)

Hung Chia Wei

Sprint

- Qualifications December 11: 11.059; 10th place (advance to Round of 16)
- Round of 16 December 11 v. (Japan) Kazunari Watanabe - Loss
- Quarterfinals B December 12 v. (Bahrain) Mohamed Husain - Win 12.012
- Semifinals B December 13 v. (Philippines) Jan Paul Morales - Loss
- Finals B December 13 v. (United Arab Emirates) Badr Ali Shambih - Win 11.798 (11th place)

Liu Chin Feng

4km Individual Pursuit

- Qualifications December 9: 4:53.006; 19th place (did not advance)

Liao Kuo Lung

1km Time Trial

- Final December 9: 1:06.358; 4th place

Keirin

- Round 1 December 14: Heat 1 - 2nd place (advance to semifinal)
- Semifinal December 14: Heat 2 - 5th place (did not advance)
- Final B December 14 - 2nd place (8th place overall)

Lin Kun Hung

Sprint

- Qualifications December 11: 10.957; 9th place (advance to Round of 16)
- Round of 16 December 11 v. (South Korea) Jeon Yeong Gyu - Loss
- Quarterfinals B December 12 v. (Iraq) Mohammad Farkad - Win (w/o)
- Semifinals B December 13 v. (United Arab Emirates) Badr Ali Shambih - Win 11.345
- Finals B December 13 v. (Philippines) Jan Paul Morales - Win 11.652 (9th place)

Keirin

- Round 1 December 14: Heat 2 - DNF
- Repechage December 14: Heat 2 - 3rd Place (advance to Semifinals)
- Semifinals December 14: Heat 1; 6th place (did not advance)
- Final B December 14 - 5th place (11th place overall)

Wu Po Hung

- 15 km Points Race - December 12 Heat 2 - 24 points; 6th place (advance to final)
- 40 km Points Race - December 13 Final - 7 points; 6th place

Team Sprint Hung Chia Wei, Li Chung Ling, and Liao Kuo Lung

- Qualifications December 10: 48.295; 6th place (did not advance)
- Quarterfinals B December 12 v. (Bahrain) Mohamed Husain - Win 12.012

4 km Team Pursuit Chen Chien Ting, Lee Wei Cheng, Lin Heng Hui, and Liu Chin Feng

- Qualifications December 11: 4:24.940; 6th place (did not advance)

50 km Madison Chen Keng Hsien & Wu Po Hung

- Final December 14 - 9 points; 5th place

Women

Hsiao Mei Yu

500m Time Trial

- Final December 9: :36.190; Silver Medal

Sprint

- Qualification December 11: :11.957; 3rd place (advance to Quarterfinals)
- Quarterfinals December 12: v. (Japan) Sakie Tsukuda - Win 2 races to 1
- Semifinals December 13: v. (China) Gong Jinjie - Loss 0–2
- Bronze Medal Race December 13: v. (South Korea) You Jin A - Loss 0–2

Huang Ho Hsun

3km Individual Pursuit

- Qualification December 10: 3:53.553; 6th place (did not advance)

25km Points Race

- Final December 14: 3 Points; 10th place

I Fang Ju

3km Individual Pursuit

- Qualification December 10: 3:54.680; 8th place (did not advance)

25km Points Race

- Final December 14: 6 Points; 8th place

== Diving ==
Women

3 Meter Springboard Synchro

Lu En Tien & Lu Hsin

- Final December 11 - 271.53 points; 4th place

Chen Lu

1 Meter Springboard

- Final December 12 - 220.90 points; 7th place

Lu En Tien

3 Meter Springboard

- Preliminary December 13 - 245.45 points; 7th place (Quality for final)
- Final December 13 - 249.75 points; 8th place

Lu Hsin

3 Meter Springboard

- Preliminary December 13 - 277.00 points; 5th place (Qualify for final)
- Final December 13 - 254.95 points; 6th place

== Equestrian ==
December 4 Team Dressage: 60.037, 5th place

- Lee Yuan riding Laszlo 30, Lin Chun Shen riding Pani, Yeh Hsiu Hua riding Lear

December 10 and 11 Team Jumping: 32 faults, 7th place

- Jasmine Chen Shao Man riding Comodoro, Chen Yi Tsung riding Parodie 290, Joy Chen Shao Chiao riding Qualdandro, Wang Yi Hsiu riding Pik Papageno

Joy Chen Shao Chiao riding Qualdandro

Jumping

- Qualifier December 10 - 8 faults - 20th place (tie)
- Final December 12 - 5 faults - 4 faults (total 9 faults) (tied for fourth)

Jasmine Chen Shao Man riding Comodoro

Jumping

- Qualifier December 11 - 4 faults - 6th place (tie) (advance to final)
- Final December 12 - 4 faults - 4 faults (total 8 faults) (tied for second)
- Jump-off December 12 - 8 faults (win) Silver Medal

Chiang Han Ju riding Game Boy

Three-Day Eventing

- Dressage December 6 - 53.80 penalty points - 9th place
- Cross Country December 7 - Eliminated on course

Lee Yuan riding Laszlo 30

Dressage

- Qualifier I December 4 - 58.883%; 22nd place (did not advance)

Lin Chun Shen riding Pani

Dressage

- Qualifier I December 4 - 60.722%; 16th place (advance to next round)
- Qualifier II December 5 - 59.761%; 14th place (did not advance)

Yeh Hsiu Hua riding Lear

Dressage

- Qualifier I December 14 - 60.556%; 18th place (advance to next round)
- Qualifier II December 15 - 59.856; 12th place (advance to final)
- Final December 15 - 60.420%; 12th place

Wang Yi Hsiu riding Pik Papageno

Jumping

- Qualifier December 11–12 faults; 30th place (tied)

== Fencing ==
Women

Chang Chia Ling

Epee

- Pool 4

Fencer	NOC	Pld	W	L	Pct.	TD-TR	TR
Park Se Ra	(South Korea)	5	5	0	1.000	19	24
Hiroko Narita	(Japan)	5	3	2	0.600	2	19
Chang Chia Ling	(Chinese Taipei)	5	3	2	0.600	2	17
Ha Thi Sen	(Vietnam)	5	2	3	0.400	2	19
Roza Bikkinina	(Kyrgyzstan)	5	2	3	0.400	-10	10
Ho Sin Mei	(Macau)	5	0	5	0.000	-15	10

  - v. Park Se Ra (South Korea) - Lost 1–5
  - v. Hiroko Narita (Japan) - Lost 1–5
  - v. Ha Thi Sen (Vietnam) - Won 5–4
  - v. Roza Bikkinina (Kyrgyzstan) - Won 5–0
  - v. Ho Sin Mei (Macau) - Won 5–1
- Round of 16 v. Yeung Chui Ling (Hong Kong) - Lost 9–15

Yu Mi Hsuan

Epee

- Pool 1

Fencer	NOC	Pld	W	L	Pct.	TD-TR	TR
Li Na	(China)	6	6	0	1.000	20	28
Bjork Cheng Yuk Han	(Hong Kong)	6	5	1	0.833	15	26
Tatiana Ruban	(Kyrgyzstan)	6	3	3	0.500	3	23
Yu Mi Hsuan	(Chinese Taipei)	6	2	4	0.333	-3	21
Siritida Choochokkul	(Thailand)	6	2	4	0.333	-8	20
Ruchi Trikha	(India)	6	2	4	0.333	-9	16
Abeer Alselmi	(Kuwait)	6	1	5	0.167	-18	10

  - v. Li Na (China) - Lost 2–5
  - v. Bjork Cheng Yuk Han (Hong Kong) - Lost 2–5
  - v. Siritida Choochokkul (Thailand) - Lost 4–5
  - v. Abeer Alselmi (Kuwait) - Won 5–1
  - v. Ruchi Trikha (India) - Won 5–3
  - v. Tatiana Ruban (Kyrgyzstan) - Lost 3–5
- Round of 32 v. Roza Bikkinina (Kyrgyzstan) - Won 15–6
- Round of 16 v. Li Na (China) - Lost 9–15

Team

Yu Mi Hsuan, Cheng Ya Wen, Chen Yin Hua

- Round of 16 v. Kuwait - Win 45–20
- Quarterfinals v. China - Loss 26–43

== Football ==
Taiwan is not fielding a men's team at the Asian Games.

The women's football team will compete in group Y with North Korea, along with South Korea and Vietnam.

- November 30 - v. South Korea - Loss 0–2
- December 4 - (North Korea) v. DPR Korea - Loss 0–4
- December 7 - v. Vietnam - Win 3–1

Group Y

Team	Pts	Pld	W	D	L	GF	GA	GD
North Korea	9	3	3	0	0	13	1	+12
South Korea	6	3	2	0	1	6	5	+1
Chinese Taipei	3	3	1	0	2	3	7	−4
Vietnam	0	3	0	0	3	2	11	−9

== Golf ==
Men

Rk	Golfer	Round 1 Dec. 8	Round 2 Dec. 9	Round 3 Dec. 10	Round 4 Dec. 11	Total	+/- Par
2	Pan Cheng Tsung	66	71	68	72	277	-11
11	Chiang Chen Chih	70	69	74	72	285	-3
28	Chan Shih Chang	69	70	77	78	294	+6
41	Pan Fu Chiang	76	77	73	76	302	+14

Rk	Team	Round 1 Dec. 8	Round 2 Dec. 9	Round 3 Dec. 10	Round 4 Dec. 11	Total	+/- Par
3	Chinese Taipei	205	210	215	220	850	-14

Women

Rk	Golfer	Round 1 Dec. 8	Round 2 Dec. 9	Round 3 Dec. 10	Round 4 Dec. 11	Total	+/- Par
4	Tseng Ya Ni	67	68	69	69	273	-19
7	Yu Pei Lin	70	74	63	72	279	-13
14	Lu Kwan Chih	76	72	74	72	294	+2

Rk	Team	Round 1 Dec. 8	Round 2 Dec. 9	Round 3 Dec. 10	Round 4 Dec. 11	Total	+/- Par
3	Chinese Taipei	137	140	132	141	550	-36

== Gymnastics ==
Artistic Gymnastics (Men)

- Team December 2 - 345.9 (Sixth place)

Pos.	NOC/Names	Floor	P.Horse	Rings	Vault	P.Bars	H.Bar	Total
6	Chinese Taipei	54.650	59.150	57.750	62.750	56.550	55.150	345.900
	Chang Che-Wei; Huang Che-Kuei; Huang Tai-I; Huang Yi-Hsueh; Lin Hsiang Wei; Weng Shih-Hang	NC; 13.350; 13.050; 13.750; 14.500; NC	13.850; 15.550; 14.450; 12.950; 15.300; NC	13.650; 14.700; 13.900; 14.150; NC; 15.000	NC; 15.700; 14.850; 16.600; 15.600; 14.750	13.950; 14.550; 13.550; 14.400; NC; NC	13.600; 14.650; 12.900; 14.000; NC; NC	55.050; 88.500; 82.700; 85.850; 45.400; 29.750

- Pommel Horse December 5
  - Huang Che Kuei - 14.700 (fourth place)
  - Lin Hsiang Wei - 14.600 (sixth place)
- Vault December 6
  - Huang Yi Hsueh - 1st Vault: 16.475; 2nd Vault: 0.000; TOTAL: 8.237

Rhythmic Gymnastics (Women)

Pos.	NOC/Names	Rope	Ball	Clubs	Ribbon	Total
7	Chinese Taipei	38.350	39.050	38.425	39.550	131.775
	Lai Ying Tzu (12th); Wu Pei Yi (23rd); Yu Pei Lung (22nd)	13.400; 12.400; 12.550	14.275; 13.175; 11.600	13.550; 12.000; 12.875	13.350; 12.975; 13.225	41.225; 38.550; 38.650

Rank	Athlete	NOC	Rope	Ball	Clubs	Ribbon	Total
12	Lai Ying Tzu	(Chinese Taipei)	13.200	14.075	13.600	12.900	53.775
16	Yu Pei Lung	(Chinese Taipei)	12.950	13.525	12.700	12.725	51.900

== Handball ==
There was no Taiwanese men's team at the event.

Taiwan's women's team has been drawn in Group B with Japan, South Korea, and Thailand.

- December 7 - v. Japan - Loss 20–31
- December 9 - v. South Korea - Loss 17–44
- December 10 - v. Thailand - Win 30–24
- December 12 - v. Uzbekistan - Win 26-25 (Fifth place match)

Team	Pts	Pld	W	D	L	GF	GA	GD
South Korea	6	3	3	0	0	117	52	+65
Japan	4	3	2	0	1	92	61	+31
Chinese Taipei	2	3	1	0	2	67	99	− 32
Thailand	0	3	0	0	3	51	115	− 64

== Hockey ==
There will be men's and women's teams fielded by the Taiwanese in the field hockey tournaments.

Men

The men were drawn into group A with Hong Kong, Japan, Malaysia, and Pakistan.

- December 4, 2006 v. Hong Kong - Win 1–0
- December 7, 2006 v. Japan - Loss 0–4
- December 9, 2006 v. Pakistan - Loss 0–9
- December 10, 2006 v. Malaysia - Loss 0–9
- December 12, 2006 v. India - Loss 1-12 (classification round)
- December 14, 2006 v. Bangladesh - Loss 1-5 (seventh place match)

Goal Scorers

Huang Po-Hsiung 1
Fan Kuo-Heng 1
Tsai Ming-Heng 1

Team	Pts	Pld	W	D	L	GF	GA	GD
Pakistan	8	4	2	2	0	20	2	+18
Japan	8	4	2	2	0	18	3	+15
Malaysia	8	4	2	2	0	14	4	+10
Chinese Taipei	3	4	1	0	3	1	22	−21
Hong Kong	0	4	0	0	4	3	25	−22

Women

All women's entrants played in a single round robin group.

- December 2, 2006 (South Korea) Korea - Lost 0–8
- December 3, 2006 India - Lost 0–7
- December 5, 2006 Japan - Lost 0–12
- December 6, 2006 Hong Kong - Draw 0–0
- December 8, 2006 Malaysia - Loss 0–2
- December 9, 2006 China - Loss 0–7
- December 13, 2006 Malaysia - Loss 0-5 (Fifth place match)

Team	Pts	Pld	W	D	L	GF	GA	GD
Japan	16	6	5	1	0	35	2	+33
China	15	6	5	0	1	24	5	+19
(South Korea) Korea	13	6	4	1	1	32	5	+27
India	9	6	3	0	3	21	10	+11
Malaysia	6	6	2	0	4	8	20	−12
Chinese Taipei	1	6	0	1	5	0	36	−36
Hong Kong	1	6	0	1	5	1	43	−42

== Judo ==
=== Men ===
60 Kilograms

- Lin Chueh Chen - lost Bronze Medal Match

=== Women ===
Liu Shu Yun

- 70 Kilograms
  - Bronze Medalist

Wang Chin Fang

- 63 Kilograms
  - Lost Bronze Medal Match

== Rowing ==
=== Men ===
- Double Sculls
  - Wang Ming Hui and Chang Chien Hsiung
    - December 3 Heat 2 - 3:59.90, 2nd Place - advance to Semifinals
    - December 5 A/B Semifinal 1 - 3:31.55, 3rd Place - B Final
    - December 6 Final B - 3:22.77, 2nd Place (6th place overall)
- Lightweight Double Sculls
  - Wen Kuang Cheng & Lin Yen Chen
    - December 3 Heat 4 - 4:34.07, 1st Place - advance to Semifinals
    - December 5 A/B Semifinal 2 - 3:40.43, 3rd Place - B Final
    - December 6 Final B - 3:28.31, 3rd Place (7th place overall)

=== Women ===
- Single Sculls
  - Chiang Chieh Ju
    - December 3 Heat 2 - 5:04.20, 2nd Place - advance to Semifinals
    - December 5 A/B Semifinal 1 - 3:44.21, 3rd Place - Final B
- Lightweight Double Sculls
  - Lu Ming Chen and Liu Yu Hsin
    - December 3 Heat 1 - 5:10.01, 3rd Place - repechage
    - December 4 Repechage - 4:31.84, 3rd Place - Final B
    - December 6 Final B - 4:04.49, 1st Place (5th place overall)
- Four Oars Without Coxswain
  - Tsai Chia Ying, Hsieh Li Chun, Lin Pei Yin, Yu Chen Chun
    - December 3 Heat 2 - 4:49.12, 4th Place - repechage
    - December 4 Repechage - 4:02.49, 1st Place - advance to Semifinals
    - December 5 A/B Semifinal 2 - 3:47.91, 3rd Place - Final B
    - December 6 Final B - 3:47.83, 1st Place (5th place overall)

== Rugby Sevens ==
Taiwan will field a team and have been drawn in Group C with Qatar and rivals Japan.

December 10

- 18:00 - v. Qatar
- 21:30 - v. Japan

Team	Pts	Pld	W	L	GW	GL
Chinese Taipei	0	0	0	0	0	0
Qatar	0	0	0	0	0	0
Japan	0	0	0	0	0	0

- December 2 v. Philippines - Win 3–0
- December 2 v. Nepal
- December 2 v. Japan

Team	Pts	Pld	W	L	GF	GA
Japan	2	1	1	0	3	0
Chinese Taipei	2	1	1	0	3	0
Nepal	1	1	0	1	0	3
Philippines	1	1	0	1	0	3

== Sailing ==
=== Women's ===
- Single Handed Dinghy Optimist

Sailor	NOC	Dec. 5	Dec. 6	Dec. 7			Dec. 8			Dec. 10		Dec. 11	Dec. 12	Total	Net
Sailor	NOC	1	2	3	4	5	6	7	8	9	10	11	12	Total	Net
Won Kai Han	Sixth	4	5	6	5	7	5	6	7	6	6			57	50

== Shooting ==
=== Women ===
Lin Yin Chun

- Trap
  - December 2 - Final BRONZE MEDAL

== Soft Tennis ==
=== Men ===
- December 2 v. Philippines - Win 3–0
- December 2 v. Nepal - Win 3–0
- December 2 v. Japan - Win 2–1

Team	Pts	Pld	W	L	GF	GA
Chinese Taipei	6	3	3	0	9	0
Japan	5	3	2	1	6	3
Nepal	4	3	1	2	2	7
Philippines	3	3	0	3	1	8

- December 2 Quarterfinals - Bye
- December 3 Semifinals - v. Mongolia Win 2–0
- December 3 Gold Medal Match - v. Japan Loss 1–2

=== Women ===
- December 2 v. Mongolia - Win 3–0
- December 2 v. Japan - Lost 1–2

Japan	3–0	Mongolia
Chinese Taipei	3–0	Mongolia
Chinese Taipei	1–2	Japan

- December 2 Quarterfinals v. Philippines - Win 2–0
- December 3 Semifinals v. Korea - Loss 0–2
- December 3 Bronze Medal Match v. China - Win 2–0

=== Mixed doubles ===
Fang Yen Ling & Yeh Chia Lin

1st Round - v. DE LEON JR. Wenifredo & ESCALA Divina Gracia (Philippines) - Win 5-1
2nd Round - v. NAKAHORI Shigeo & UESHIMA Ayumi (Japan) - Loss 1-5
Classification - v. MUNGUNTSETSEG Anudari & RADNAABAZAR Bayartogtokh (Mongolia) - Win 5-1
Fifth Place Match - v. Chou Chiu Ping & Li Chia Hung (Chinese Taipei) - Loss 1-5

Chou Chiu Ping & Li Chia Hung

1st Round - BYE
2nd Round - v. KIM Ji Eun & WE Hyu Hwan (South Korea) - Loss 0-5
Classification - v. BANTAY Petrona & SILVOZA Orlando II (Philippines) - Win 5-0
Fifth Place Match - v. FANG Yen Ling & YEH Chia Lin (Chinese Taipei) - Win 5-1

== Softball ==
The Taiwanese will join four other East Asian neighbors for the softball competition.

- December 10, 2006 (08:30) v. (South Korea) Korea
- December 10, 2006 (13:30) v. (North Korea) Korea DPR
- December 11, 2006 (11:00) v. Japan
- December 12, 2006 (11:00) v. China

Team	W	L	Pct.	RS	RA	DI	RA/9DI
Chinese Taipei							
(South Korea) Korea							
Japan							
China							
(North Korea) Korea DPR							

== Swimming ==
=== Men ===
Chen Te Tung

- 200 m freestyle December 3
  - Heat - 1:57.96 (6th in heat)

Chiang Hsin Hung

- 50 m breaststroke December 3
  - Heat - :29.34 (2nd in heat)
  - Final -

Hsu Chi Chieh

- 100 m butterfly December 3
  - Heat - :55.29 (3rd in heat)
  - Final - :55.60 (8th in final)
- 200 m butterfly December 2
  - Heat - 2:02.00 (3rd in heat)
  - Final - 2:00.27 (5th in final)

Lin Yu An

- 400 m individual medley December 2
  - Heat - 4:42.11 (4th in heat)

Tang Sheng Chieh

- 200 m freestyle December 3
  - Heat - 1:55.32 (4th in heat)

Tsai Kuo Chuan

- 400 m individual medley December 2
  - Heat - 4:39.95 (3rd in heat)

Wang Wei Wen

- 50 m breaststroke December 3
  - Heat - :30.55 (6th in heat)

=== Women ===
He Hsu Jung

- 200m Backstroke December 3
  - Heat - 2:21.62 (4th in heat)

Lin Man Hsu

- 400m Individual Medley December 3
  - Heat - 4:58.00 (4th in heat)
  - Final - 4:55.88 (6th in final)

Nieh Pin Chieh

- 200 Meter Freestyle
  - Heat - 2:05.71 (3rd in heat)
  - Final - 2:07.35 (8th in final)

Tsai I Chuan

- 100m Butterfly
  - Heat - 1:05.93 (5th in heat)

Yang Chin Kuei

- 200 Meter Freestyle
  - Heat - 2:03.22 (2nd in heat)
  - Final - 2:02.21 (5th in final)

400m Medley Relay - He Hsu Jung, Lin Man Hsu, Yang Chin Kuei, Nieh Pin Chieh

- Final - 4:22.14 (6th in final)

400m Freestyle Relay - Yang Chin Kuei, Nieh Pin Chieh, Tsai I Chuan, Lin Man Hsu

- Heat - 3:52.80 (2nd in heat)
- Final -

== Table Tennis ==
=== Team ===
The Taiwanese are fielding a men's team for the Table Tennis team event. They have been drawn in Group D with Tajikistan (who later withdrew,) Singapore, and North Korea.

- November 29 19:00 v. Singapore - Win 3–1
- December 30 12:30 v. (North Korea) Korea DPR - Win 3–1

Team	Pts	Pld	W	L	GW	GL
Chinese Taipei	4	2	2	0	6	2
Singapore	3	2	1	1	4	5
(North Korea) Korea DPR	2	2	0	2	3	6

- Quarterfinal: November 30 v. Vietnam - Win 3–0
- Semifinal: December 2 v. China - Loss 0–3

=== Doubles ===
==== Men ====
Chiang Peng Lung & Chuang Chih Yuan

- Round of 32: December 4 v. (Bahrain) Hamad Bu Hijji & Anwar Saleh

Chang Yen Shu & Wu Chih Chi

- Round of 32: December 4 v. (India) Pathik Nisheeth Mehta & Subhajit Saha

==== Women ====
Huang Yi Hua & Lu Yun Feng

- Round of 32: December 4 v. (Thailand) Nanthana Komwong & Anisara Muangsuk

==== Mixed ====
Chuang Chih Yuan & Huang Yi Hua

- Round of 32: December 3 v. (Macau) Vong Hon Weng & Wong Sio Leng Win 3-0 (11–5, 11–5, 11–3)
- Round of 16:

Chiang Peng Lung & Lu Yun Feng

- Round of 32: December 3 v. (North Korea) Ri Chol Guk & Kim Mi Yong Loss 1-3 (12–10, 9–11, 6–11, 4–11)

== Taekwondo ==
=== Men ===
Chu Mu Yen December 8 – 58 kg - bronze medalist

Liao Chia Hsing December 8 – 78 kg bronze medalist

=== Women ===
Su Li Wen December 7 – 63 kg gold medalist

Wu Yen Ni December 8 – 51 kg silver medalist

Yang Shu Chun December 7 – 47 kg silver medalist

== Volleyball ==
=== Men ===
==== Round One ====
The Men's Volleyball Team has been drawn in Group C in the first round and will play Kuwait and Maldives in the first round.

November 27, 2006

Country	Game 1	Game 2	Game 3	Game 4	Match Score
Chinese Taipei	25	25	25	25	3
Kuwait	17	18	25	18	1

November 28, 2006

Country	Game 1	Game 2	Game 3	Match Score
Maldives	0	0	0	0
Chinese Taipei	25	25	25	3

- Forfeit

Team	Pts	Pld	W	L	GW	GL
Chinese Taipei	4	2	2	0	6	1
Kuwait	3	2	1	1	4	3
Maldives	2	2	0	2	0	6

==== Round Two ====
December 3

Country	Game 1	Game 2	Game 3	Match Score
Macau	12	23	13	0
Chinese Taipei	25	25	25	3

December 5

Country	Game 1	Game 2	Game 3	Match Score
Chinese Taipei	25	25	25	3
Hong Kong	15	18	19	0

December 7

Country	Game 1	Game 2	Game 3	Match Score
Thailand	15	13	21	0
Chinese Taipei	25	25	25	3

December 9

Country	Game 1	Game 2	Game 3	Match Score		
Chinese Taipei	25	23	25	19	13	2
Bahrain	18	25	17	25	15	3

Team	Pts	Pld	W	L	GW	GL
Bahrain	8	4	4	0	12	3
Chinese Taipei	7	4	3	1	11	3
Thailand	6	4	2	2	7	6
Hong Kong	5	4	1	3	3	9
Macau	4	4	0	4	0	12

=== Women ===
The Taiwanese women have been drawn into group A for the first preliminary round with China, Vietnam, and South Korea.

- November 30

Country	Game 1	Game 2	Game 3	Game 4	Game 5	Match Score
South Korea	21	20	25	25	15	3
Chinese Taipei	25	25	23	19	9	2

December 3, 2006

Country	Game 1	Game 2	Game 3	Game 4	Match Score
Vietnam	25	18	15	14	1
Chinese Taipei	23	25	25	25	3

December 6

Country	Game 1	Game 2	Game 3	Match Score
Chinese Taipei	17	17	17	0
China	25	25	25	3

Team	Pts	Pld	W	L	GW	GL
China	6	3	3	0	9	0
South Korea	5	3	2	1	6	5
Chinese Taipei	4	3	1	2	5	7
Vietnam	3	3	0	3	1	9

- Quarterfinals - December 8

December 3, 2006

Country	Game 1	Game 2	Game 3	Game 4	Game 5	Match Score
Kazakhstan	19	25	25	29	13	2
Chinese Taipei	25	22	22	31	15	3

- Semifinal - December 10

December 3, 2006

Country	Game 1	Game 2	Game 3	Match Score
China	25	25	25	3
Chinese Taipei	17	13	17	0

- Bronze Medal match - December 12 v. Thailand

== Weightlifting ==
=== Men ===
Wang Shin Yuan

- 56 Kilogram: Snatch - 118 kg; Clean & Jerk - 155 kg; TOTAL - 273 kg (5th in final)

=== Women ===
Fang Hsin Tzu

- 53 Kilogram: Snatch - 80 kg; Clean & Jerk - 116 kg; TOTAL - 186 kg (7th in final)
