= List of Asian Games medalists in soft tennis =

Asian Games

This is the complete list of Asian Games medalists in soft tennis from 1994 to 2022.

== Events ==
=== Men's singles ===
Games	Gold	Silver	Bronze
2002 Busan	Kim Kyung-han (KOR)	Kim Hee-soo (KOR)	Liao Nan-kai (TPE)
2006 Doha	Wang Chun-yen (TPE)	Hidenori Shinohara (JPN)	Nam Taek-ho (KOR)
2010 Guangzhou	Lee Yo-han (KOR)	Bae Hwan-sung (KOR)	Keiya Nakamoto (JPN)
2010 Guangzhou	Lee Yo-han (KOR)	Bae Hwan-sung (KOR)	Yang Sheng-fa (TPE)
2014 Incheon	Kim Hyeong-jun (KOR)	Edi Kusdaryanto (INA)	Zhou Mo (CHN)
2014 Incheon	Kim Hyeong-jun (KOR)	Edi Kusdaryanto (INA)	Kim Dong-hoon (KOR)
2018 Jakarta–Palembang	Kim Jin-woong (KOR)	Elbert Sie (INA)	Prima Simpatiaji (INA)
2018 Jakarta–Palembang	Kim Jin-woong (KOR)	Elbert Sie (INA)	Kim Dong-hoon (KOR)
2022 Hangzhou	Toshiki Uematsu (JPN)	Chang Yu-sung (TPE)	Yoon Hyoung-wook (KOR)
2022 Hangzhou	Toshiki Uematsu (JPN)	Chang Yu-sung (TPE)	Chen Yu-hsun (TPE)

=== Men's doubles ===
Games	Gold	Silver	Bronze
1994 Hiroshima	Lee Myung-gu and You Young-dong (KOR)	Jang Han-sub and Lee Suk-woo (KOR)	Liao Nan-kai and Lai Yung-liao (TPE)
1998 Bangkok	Kuo Hsu-tung and Fang Tung-hsien (TPE)	Liao Nan-kai and Yeh I-ming (TPE)	Jun In-soo and You Young-dong (KOR)
2002 Busan	Lee Won-hak and You Young-dong (KOR)	Hwang Jeong-hwan and Kim Hee-soo (KOR)	Liao Nan-kai and Tsai Ho-tsen (TPE)
2006 Doha	Li Chia-hung and Yang Sheng-fa (TPE)	Kim Jae-bok and You Young-dong (KOR)	Shigeo Nakahori and Tsuneo Takagawa (JPN)
2010 Guangzhou	Li Chia-hung and Yang Sheng-fa (TPE)	Bae Hwan-sung and Kim Tae-jung (KOR)	Koji Kobayashi and Hidenori Shinohara (JPN)
2010 Guangzhou	Li Chia-hung and Yang Sheng-fa (TPE)	Bae Hwan-sung and Kim Tae-jung (KOR)	Shigeo Nakahori and Tsuneo Takagawa (JPN)
2014 Incheon	Kim Dong-hoon and Kim Beom-jun (KOR)	Lin Ting-chun and Li Chia-hung (TPE)	Lee Sang-gwon and Park Kyu-cheol (KOR)
2014 Incheon	Kim Dong-hoon and Kim Beom-jun (KOR)	Lin Ting-chun and Li Chia-hung (TPE)	Ho Meng-hsun and Lai Li-huang (TPE)

=== Men's team ===
Games	Gold	Silver	Bronze
1994 Hiroshima	Chinese Taipei (TPE); Chen Hsin-teng; Hsieh Shun-feng; Lai Yung-liao; Liao Nan-kai; Liu Hung-yu	South Korea (KOR); Jang Han-sub; Kim Tae-kyun; Lee Myung-gu; Lee Suk-woo; You Young-dong	Japan (JPN); Takahisa Hirayama; Hideyuki Kitamoto; Hironobu Saito; Tsuneo Takagawa; Akihiro Uematsu
1998 Bangkok	South Korea (KOR); Choi Ji-hun; Jun In-soo; Kim Hee-soo; Kim Kyung-han; You Young-dong	Chinese Taipei (TPE); Fang Tung-hsien; Kuo Hsu-tung; Liao Nan-kai; Sie Shun-feng; Yeh I-ming	Japan (JPN); Takahisa Hirayama; Hideyuki Kitamoto; Shigeo Nakahori; Hironobu Saito; Tsuneo Takagawa
2002 Busan	South Korea (KOR); Hwang Jeong-hwan; Kim Hee-soo; Kim Kyung-han; Lee Won-hak; You Young-dong	Japan (JPN); Shuji Komine; Yasuhito Mitsuishi; Shigeo Nakahori; Tsuneo Takagawa; Hikotsugu Watanabe	Chinese Taipei (TPE); Fang Tung-hsien; Kuo Hsu-tung; Liao Nan-kai; Liu Chia-lun; Tsai Ho-tsen
2006 Doha	Japan (JPN); Noaya Hanada; Tatsuro Kawamura; Shigeo Nakahori; Hidenori Shinohara; Tsuneo Takagawa	Chinese Taipei (TPE); Li Chia-hung; Lin Shun-wu; Wang Chun-yen; Yang Sheng-fa; Yeh Chia-lin	South Korea (KOR); Jong Young-pal; Kim Jae-bok; Nam Taek-ho; We Hyu-hwan; You Young-dong
2010 Guangzhou	Chinese Taipei (TPE); Kuo Chia-wei; Li Chia-hung; Lin Ting-chun; Liu Chia-lun; Yang Sheng-fa	Japan (JPN); Koji Kobayashi; Shigeo Nakahori; Keiya Nakamoto; Hidenori Shinohara; Tsuneo Takagawa	China (CHN); Chai Jin; Chen Mingdong; Jiao Yang; Li Xiang; Shi Bo
2010 Guangzhou	Chinese Taipei (TPE); Kuo Chia-wei; Li Chia-hung; Lin Ting-chun; Liu Chia-lun; Yang Sheng-fa	Japan (JPN); Koji Kobayashi; Shigeo Nakahori; Keiya Nakamoto; Hidenori Shinohara; Tsuneo Takagawa	South Korea (KOR); Bae Hwan-sung; Ji Yong-min; Kim Tae-jung; Lee Yeon; Lee Yo-han
2014 Incheon	South Korea (KOR); Kim Beom-jun; Kim Dong-hoon; Kim Hyeong-jun; Lee Sang-gwon; Park Kyu-cheol	Japan (JPN); Takuya Katsura; Koji Kobayashi; Koichi Nagae; Keiya Nakamoto; Hidenori Shinohara	China (CHN); Li Ze; Lin Chengwei; Shi Xiaolin; Zhang Yusheng; Zhou Mo
2014 Incheon	South Korea (KOR); Kim Beom-jun; Kim Dong-hoon; Kim Hyeong-jun; Lee Sang-gwon; Park Kyu-cheol	Japan (JPN); Takuya Katsura; Koji Kobayashi; Koichi Nagae; Keiya Nakamoto; Hidenori Shinohara	Chinese Taipei (TPE); Ho Meng-hsun; Lai Li-huang; Li Chia-hung; Lin Ting-chun; Lin Yu-tse
2018 Jakarta–Palembang	South Korea (KOR); Jeon Jee-heon; Kim Beom-jun; Kim Dong-hoon; Kim Jin-woong; Kim Ki-sung	Japan (JPN); Hayato Funemizu; Taimei Marunaka; Kento Masuda; Koichi Nagae; Toshiki Uematsu	Indonesia (INA); Hemat Bhakti Anugerah; Irfandi Hendrawan; Gusti Jaya Kusuma; Elbert Sie; Prima Simpatiaji
2018 Jakarta–Palembang	South Korea (KOR); Jeon Jee-heon; Kim Beom-jun; Kim Dong-hoon; Kim Jin-woong; Kim Ki-sung	Japan (JPN); Hayato Funemizu; Taimei Marunaka; Kento Masuda; Koichi Nagae; Toshiki Uematsu	Chinese Taipei (TPE); Chen Tsung-wen; Chen Yu-hsun; Kuo Chien-chun; Lin Wei-chieh; Yu Kai-wen
2022 Hangzhou	Japan (JPN); Hayato Funemizu; Sora Hirooka; Riku Uchida; Takafumi Uchimoto; Toshiki Uematsu	Chinese Taipei (TPE); Chang Yu-sung; Chen Po-yi; Chen Yu-hsun; Lin Wei-chieh; Yu Kai-wen	Indonesia (INA); Mario Harley Alibasa; Hemat Bhakti Anugerah; Tio Juliandi Hutauruk; Fernando Sanger; Sunu Wahyu Trijati
2022 Hangzhou	Japan (JPN); Hayato Funemizu; Sora Hirooka; Riku Uchida; Takafumi Uchimoto; Toshiki Uematsu	Chinese Taipei (TPE); Chang Yu-sung; Chen Po-yi; Chen Yu-hsun; Lin Wei-chieh; Yu Kai-wen	South Korea (KOR); Kim Byung-gook; Kim Hyun-soo; Kim Tae-min; Lee Hyeon-su; Yoon Hyoung-wook

=== Women's singles ===
Games	Gold	Silver	Bronze
2002 Busan	Park Young-hee (KOR)	Kim Hyun-ju (KOR)	Zhao Ying (CHN)
2006 Doha	Chiang Wan-chi (TPE)	Jiang Ting (CHN)	Miwa Tsuji (JPN)
2010 Guangzhou	Zhao Lei (CHN)	Kim Ae-kyung (KOR)	Kim Kyung-ryun (KOR)
2010 Guangzhou	Zhao Lei (CHN)	Kim Ae-kyung (KOR)	Chiang Wan-chi (TPE)
2014 Incheon	Kim Bo-mi (KOR)	Chen Hui (CHN)	Zhong Yi (CHN)
2014 Incheon	Kim Bo-mi (KOR)	Chen Hui (CHN)	Kim Ae-kyung (KOR)
2018 Jakarta–Palembang	Noa Takahashi (JPN)	Cheng Chu-ling (TPE)	Yu Yuanyi (CHN)
2018 Jakarta–Palembang	Noa Takahashi (JPN)	Cheng Chu-ling (TPE)	Dwi Rahayu Pitri (INA)
2022 Hangzhou	Mun Hye-gyeong (KOR)	Noa Takahashi (JPN)	Li Denglin (CHN)
2022 Hangzhou	Mun Hye-gyeong (KOR)	Noa Takahashi (JPN)	Ma Yue (CHN)

=== Women's doubles ===
Games	Gold	Silver	Bronze
1994 Hiroshima	Miyuki Kumano and Yuriko Sunamoto (JPN)	Yoon Sun-kyung and Jung Soon-young (KOR)	Reiko Sahashi and Miyuki Furusawa (JPN)
1998 Bangkok	Kang Ji-sook and Lee Mi-kyung (KOR)	Lin Li-jung and Cheng Shu-chen (TPE)	Naoko Higashi and Yuko Miyaji (JPN)
2002 Busan	Kim Seo-woon and Jang Mi-hwa (KOR)	Shino Mizukami and Shiho Yatagai (JPN)	Park Young-hee and Kim Myung-hee (KOR)
2006 Doha	Harumi Gyokusen and Ayumi Ueshima (JPN)	Hiromi Hamanaka and Miwa Tsuji (JPN)	Kim Kyung-ryun and Lee Kyung-pyo (KOR)
2010 Guangzhou	Hitomi Sugimoto and Eri Uehara (JPN)	Joo Og and Kim Ae-kyung (KOR)	Xin Yani and Zhao Lei (CHN)
2010 Guangzhou	Hitomi Sugimoto and Eri Uehara (JPN)	Joo Og and Kim Ae-kyung (KOR)	Ayaka Oba and Mai Sasaki (JPN)
2014 Incheon	Joo Og and Kim Ae-kyung (KOR)	Yoon Soo-jung and Kim Ji-yeon (KOR)	Nao Morita and Hikaru Yamashita (JPN)
2014 Incheon	Joo Og and Kim Ae-kyung (KOR)	Yoon Soo-jung and Kim Ji-yeon (KOR)	Cheng Chu-ling and Chen Yi-chia (TPE)

=== Women's team ===
Games	Gold	Silver	Bronze
1994 Hiroshima	South Korea (KOR); Jung Soon-young; Kang Ji-sook; Park Soon-joung; Park Young-a; Yoon Sun-kyung	Chinese Taipei (TPE); Chang Shih-tsung; Chang Shu-chuan; Cheng Shu-chen; Lin Li-jung; Peng Mei-yuan	Japan (JPN); Miyuki Furusawa; Yoshiko Goto; Miyuki Kumano; Reiko Sahashi; Yuriko Sunamoto
1998 Bangkok	South Korea (KOR); Kang Ji-sook; Lee Mi-hwa; Lee Mi-kyung; Yang Kum-yo; Yoon Sun-kyung	Japan (JPN); Naoko Higashi; Satoko Ishikawa; Yuko Miyaji; Shino Mizukami; Tomoka Oku	Chinese Taipei (TPE); Chang Shu-chuan; Cheng Shu-chen; Hsu I-chia; Lin Li-jung; Lin Mei-ling
2002 Busan	South Korea (KOR); Jang Mi-hwa; Kim Hyun-ju; Kim Myung-hee; Kim Seo-woon; Park Young-hee	Japan (JPN); Harumi Gyokusen; Shino Mizukami; Miwa Tsuji; Ayumi Ueshima; Shiho Yatagai	Chinese Taipei (TPE); Chang Fang-tzu; Chiang Wan-chi; Chou Chiu-ping; Lan Yi-yun; Wang Shi-ting
2006 Doha	South Korea (KOR); Kim Ji-eun; Kim Kyung-ryun; Lee Bok-soon; Lee Kyung-pyo; Min Soo-kyoung	Japan (JPN); Harumi Gyokusen; Hiromi Hamanaka; Miwa Tsuji; Eri Uehara; Ayumi Ueshima	Chinese Taipei (TPE); Chiang Wan-chi; Chou Chiu-ping; Fang Yen-ling; Lan Yi-yun; Yang Hui-ju
2010 Guangzhou	Japan (JPN); Kana Morihara; Ayaka Oba; Mai Sasaki; Hitomi Sugimoto; Eri Uehara	Chinese Taipei (TPE); Chang Wen-hsin; Cheng Chu-ling; Chiang Wan-chi; Chu Yun-hsuan; Hang Chia-ling	China (CHN); Gao Tong; Hao Jie; Qiu Sisi; Xin Yani; Zhao Lei
2010 Guangzhou	Japan (JPN); Kana Morihara; Ayaka Oba; Mai Sasaki; Hitomi Sugimoto; Eri Uehara	Chinese Taipei (TPE); Chang Wen-hsin; Cheng Chu-ling; Chiang Wan-chi; Chu Yun-hsuan; Hang Chia-ling	South Korea (KOR); Joo Og; Kim Ae-kyung; Kim Kyung-ryun; Kwon Ran-hee; Park Soon-joung
2014 Incheon	South Korea (KOR); Joo Og; Kim Ae-kyung; Kim Bo-mi; Kim Ji-yeon; Yoon Soo-jung	Japan (JPN); Nao Kobayashi; Kana Morihara; Nao Morita; Ayaka Oba; Hikaru Yamashita	China (CHN); Chen Hui; Feng Zixuan; Liu Ge; Xin Yani; Zhong Yi
2014 Incheon	South Korea (KOR); Joo Og; Kim Ae-kyung; Kim Bo-mi; Kim Ji-yeon; Yoon Soo-jung	Japan (JPN); Nao Kobayashi; Kana Morihara; Nao Morita; Ayaka Oba; Hikaru Yamashita	Chinese Taipei (TPE); Chan Chia-hsin; Chen Yi-chia; Cheng Chu-ling; Chiang Wan-chi; Kuo Chien-chi
2018 Jakarta–Palembang	Japan (JPN); Misaki Hangai; Riko Hayashida; Rurika Kuroki; Kurumi Onoue; Noa Takahashi	South Korea (KOR); Baek Seol; Kim Ji-yeon; Kim Young-hai; Mun Hye-gyeong; Yoo Ye-seul	China (CHN); Feng Zixuan; Liu Yin; Ma Yue; Wang Yufei; Yu Yuanyi
2018 Jakarta–Palembang	Japan (JPN); Misaki Hangai; Riko Hayashida; Rurika Kuroki; Kurumi Onoue; Noa Takahashi	South Korea (KOR); Baek Seol; Kim Ji-yeon; Kim Young-hai; Mun Hye-gyeong; Yoo Ye-seul	Chinese Taipei (TPE); Chan Chia-hsin; Cheng Chu-ling; Huang Shih-yuan; Kuo Chien-chi; Lee Ching-wen
2022 Hangzhou	Japan (JPN); Haruka Kubo; Kurumi Onoue; Tomomi Shimuta; Noa Takahashi; Emina Watanabe	Chinese Taipei (TPE); Cheng Chu-ling; Hsu Chiao-ying; Huang Shih-yuan; Kuo Chien-chi; Lo Shu-ting	China (CHN); Fu Xiaochen; Li Denglin; Ma Yue
2022 Hangzhou	Japan (JPN); Haruka Kubo; Kurumi Onoue; Tomomi Shimuta; Noa Takahashi; Emina Watanabe	Chinese Taipei (TPE); Cheng Chu-ling; Hsu Chiao-ying; Huang Shih-yuan; Kuo Chien-chi; Lo Shu-ting	South Korea (KOR); Ji Da-young; Ko Eun-ji; Lee Min-seon; Lim Jin-ah; Mun Hye-gyeong

=== Mixed doubles ===
Games	Gold	Silver	Bronze
2002 Busan	You Young-dong and Kim Seo-woon (KOR)	Fang Tung-hsien and Chou Chiu-ping (TPE)	Kim Hee-soo and Park Young-hee (KOR)
2006 Doha	We Hyu-hwan and Kim Ji-eun (KOR)	You Young-dong and Kim Kyung-ryun (KOR)	Tsuneo Takagawa and Harumi Gyokusen (JPN)
2010 Guangzhou	Ji Yong-min and Kim Kyung-ryun (KOR)	Li Chia-hung and Cheng Chu-ling (TPE)	Kim Tae-jung and Kim Ae-kyung (KOR)
2010 Guangzhou	Ji Yong-min and Kim Kyung-ryun (KOR)	Li Chia-hung and Cheng Chu-ling (TPE)	Liu Chia-lun and Hang Chia-ling (TPE)
2014 Incheon	Kim Beom-jun and Kim Ae-kyung (KOR)	Zhou Mo and Chen Hui (CHN)	Prima Simpatiaji and Maya Rosa (INA)
2014 Incheon	Kim Beom-jun and Kim Ae-kyung (KOR)	Zhou Mo and Chen Hui (CHN)	Park Kyu-cheol and Kim Ji-yeon (KOR)
2018 Jakarta–Palembang	Yu Kai-wen and Cheng Chu-ling (TPE)	Kim Ki-sung and Mun Hye-gyeong (KOR)	Toshiki Uematsu and Riko Hayashida (JPN)
2018 Jakarta–Palembang	Yu Kai-wen and Cheng Chu-ling (TPE)	Kim Ki-sung and Mun Hye-gyeong (KOR)	Kim Beom-jun and Kim Ji-yeon (KOR)
2022 Hangzhou	Toshiki Uematsu and Noa Takahashi (JPN)	Riku Uchida and Tomomi Shimuta (JPN)	Kim Hyun-soo and Mun Hye-gyeong (KOR)
2022 Hangzhou	Toshiki Uematsu and Noa Takahashi (JPN)	Riku Uchida and Tomomi Shimuta (JPN)	Lin Wei-chieh and Huang Shih-yuan (TPE)
