= Soft tennis at the 2022 Asian Games – Men's team =

Men's team at the 2022 Asian Games
- Venue: Hangzhou Olympic Expo Tennis Center
- Dates: 3–4 October 2023
- Competitors: 45 from 9 nations

Medalists
gold medal	Japan; Hayato Funemizu, Sora Hirooka, Riku Uchida, Takafumi Uchimoto, Toshiki Uematsu
silver medal	Chinese Taipei; Chang Yu-sung, Chen Po-yi, Chen Yu-hsun, Lin Wei-chieh, Yu Kai-wen
bronze medal	Indonesia; Mario Harley Alibasa, Hemat Bhakti Anugerah, Tio Juliandi Hutauruk, Fernando Sanger, Sunu Wahyu Trijati
bronze medal	South Korea; Kim Byung-gook, Kim Hyun-soo, Kim Tae-min, Lee Hyeon-su, Yoon Hyoung-wook

The men's team soft tennis event was part of the soft tennis programme and took place on 3 and 4 October 2023, at the Hangzhou Olympic Center Tennis Center.

== Schedule ==
All times are China Standard Time (UTC+08:00)

Date	Time	Event
Tuesday, 3 October 2023	10:00	Preliminary round
Wednesday, 4 October 2023	10:00	Semifinals
Wednesday, 4 October 2023	10:00	Final

== Results ==
=== Preliminary round ===
==== Group A ====
Pos	Team	Pld	W	L	MF	MA	MD	Qualification
1	Chinese Taipei	4	4	0	10	2	+8	Semifinals
2	South Korea	4	3	1	9	3	+6	Semifinals
3	Thailand	4	2	2	4	8	−4	
4	India	4	1	3	6	6	0	
5	Cambodia	4	0	4	1	11	−10	

Source: ASTF

3 October	South Korea	3–0	Cambodia

Kim Tae-min / Kim Hyun-soo	5–0	Doeum Samsocheaphearun / Say Sochetra	4–0, 4–0, 4–2, 4–0, 4–1
Yoon Hyoung-wook	4–0	Sam Chankaby	5–3, 4–2, 4–2, 4–0
Lee Hyeon-su / Kim Byung-gook	5–0	John Mada / Kann Sophorn	4–2, 4–1, 4–1, 4–2, 7–5

3 October	Thailand	2–1	India

Anawat Geraprasitt / Sippakorn Thong-ngiu	5–0	Aditya Dubey / Rohit Dhiman	4–1, 4–1, 4–1, 4–2, 4–1
Supakit Jaroensil	0–4	Jay Meena	1–4, 6–8, 2–4, 0–4
Kawin Yannarit / Phakkapon Thienchaipong	5–1	Aniket Patel / Rajveer Mahendrasinh Amaliyar	4–2, 7–5, 4–0, 4–0, 1–4, 5–3

3 October	Cambodia	0–3	Chinese Taipei

John Mada / Kann Sophorn	1–5	Chen Po-yi / Chang Yu-sung	1–4, 0–4, 2–4, 0–4, 4–2, 3–5
Doeum Samsocheaphearun	0–4	Chen Yu-hsun	0–4, 1–4, 1–4, 2–4
Sam Chankaby / Say Sochetra	0–5	Yu Kai-wen / Lin Wei-chieh	1–4, 3–5, 1–4, 0–4, 2–4

3 October	South Korea	3–0	Thailand

Lee Hyeon-su / Kim Byung-gook	5–2	Anawat Geraprasitt / Kawin Yannarit	4–1, 4–0, 0–4, 3–5, 4–2, 6–4, 4–0
Kim Tae-min	4–0	Supakit Jaroensil	4–0, 9–7, 4–0, 7–5
Yoon Hyoung-wook / Kim Hyun-soo	5–1	Phakkapon Thienchaipong / Sippakorn Thong-ngiu	6–4, 5–3, 4–1, 4–2, 2–4, 4–0

3 October	India	1–2	Chinese Taipei

Aditya Dubey / Rajveer Mahendrasinh Amaliyar	0–5	Chen Po-yi / Chang Yu-sung	0–4, 0–4, 2–4, 0–4, 0–4
Aniket Patel	0–4	Chen Yu-hsun	1–4, 3–5, 0–4, 2–4
Jay Meena / Rohit Dhiman	5–0	Yu Kai-wen / Lin Wei-chieh	Walkover

3 October	Cambodia	1–2	Thailand

Kann Sophorn / John Mada	4–5	Anawat Geraprasitt / Sippakorn Thong-ngiu	4–1, 2–4, 4–1, 2–4, 4–1, 4–1, 10–12, 4–6, 4–7
Doeum Samsocheaphearun	4–2	Kawin Yannarit	4–2, 4–2, 2–4, 4–1, 2–4, 5–3
Say Sochetra / Sam Chankaby	3–5	Supakit Jaroensil / Phakkapon Thienchaipong	2–4, 5–7, 5–3, 4–6, 4–1, 2–4, 4–1, 0–4

3 October	South Korea	2–1	India

Kim Hyun-soo / Kim Tae-min	5–0	Aniket Patel / Rajveer Mahendrasinh Amaliyar	5–3, 4–2, 4–2, 4–0, 4–2
Yoon Hyoung-wook	3–4	Jay Meena	4–1, 1–4, 1–4, 6–4, 3–5, 4–0, 5–7
Lee Hyeon-su / Kim Byung-gook	5–0	Aditya Dubey / Rohit Dhiman	4–0, 4–2, 6–4, 4–2, 4–1

3 October	Thailand	0–3	Chinese Taipei

Phakkapon Thienchaipong / Sippakorn Thong-ngiu	4–5	Chen Yu-hsun / Chen Po-yi	1–4, 0–4, 4–2, 5–3, 1–4, 4–2, 4–2, 1–4, 1–7
Anawat Geraprasitt	0–4	Chang Yu-sung	3–5, 2–4, 5–7, 2–4
Kawin Yannarit / Supakit Jaroensil	1–5	Lin Wei-chieh / Yu Kai-wen	4–0, 1–4, 3–5, 0–4, 1–4, 2–4

3 October	Cambodia	0–3	India

Kann Sophorn / John Mada	4–5	Jay Meena / Aniket Patel	4–2, 4–1, 2–4, 5–7, 3–5, 1–4, 4–2, 5–3, 4–7
Sam Chankaby	0–4	Aditya Dubey	0–4, 1–4, 3–5, 7–9
Doeum Samsocheaphearun / Say Sochetra	2–5	Rajveer Mahendrasinh Amaliyar / Rohit Dhiman	4–1, 1–4, 3–5, 4–1, 1–4, 1–4, 3–5

3 October	South Korea	1–2	Chinese Taipei

Kim Tae-min / Kim Hyun-soo	4–5	Yu Kai-wen / Lin Wei-chieh	1–4, 1–4, 1–4, 5–3, 0–4, 4–0, 7–5, 7–5, 6–8
Yoon Hyoung-wook	1–4	Chen Yu-hsun	10–8, 5–7, 3–5, 0–4, 1–4
Lee Hyeon-su / Kim Byung-gook	5–2	Chen Po-yi / Chang Yu-sung	4–2, 1–4, 6–8, 4–2, 4–2, 5–3, 4–2

==== Group B ====
Pos	Team	Pld	W	L	MF	MA	MD	Qualification
1	Japan	3	3	0	9	0	+9	Semifinals
2	Indonesia	3	2	1	5	4	+1	Semifinals
3	Philippines	3	1	2	3	6	−3	
4	Mongolia	3	0	3	1	8	−7	

Source: ASTF

3 October	Japan	3–0	Philippines

Takafumi Uchimoto / Riku Uchida	5–1	Sherwin Nuguit / Samuel Nuguit	4–2, 6–4, 4–2, 4–2, 2–4, 4–0
Sora Hirooka	4–1	Adjuthor Moralde	3–5, 7–5, 4–1, 5–3, 4–1
Hayato Funemizu / Toshiki Uematsu	5–0	Joseph Arcilla / Dheo Talatayod	6–4, 4–1, 5–3, 4–0, 5–3

3 October	Mongolia	1–2	Indonesia

Bayarmaagiin Bilgüün / Möngöniin Baljinnyam	1–5	Mario Harley Alibasa / Sunu Wahyu Trijati	3–5, 4–0, 0–4, 1–4, 1–4, 1–4
Bataagiin Mönkhtulga	4–3	Hemat Bhakti Anugerah	4–2, 5–3, 2–4, 2–4, 5–3, 2–4, 7–5
Amarkhüügiin Amarbayasgalan / Khürelbayaryn Khaliunbayar	0–5	Tio Juliandi Hutauruk / Fernando Sanger	1–4, 2–4, 0–4, 0–4, 1–4

3 October	Japan	3–0	Mongolia

Takafumi Uchimoto / Riku Uchida	5–0	Bayarmaagiin Bilgüün / Möngöniin Baljinnyam	4–0, 4–2, 4–0, 4–1, 5–3
Sora Hirooka	4–0	Bataagiin Mönkhtulga	4–1, 4–0, 4–0, 4–1
Hayato Funemizu / Toshiki Uematsu	5–0	Amarkhüügiin Amarbayasgalan / Khürelbayaryn Khaliunbayar	4–0, 4–1, 4–0, 5–3, 4–1

3 October	Philippines	0–3	Indonesia

Sherwin Nuguit / Samuel Nuguit	3–5	Mario Harley Alibasa / Sunu Wahyu Trijati	6–4, 1–4, 4–0, 0–4, 5–3, 0–4, 3–5, 1–4
Adjuthor Moralde	1–4	Hemat Bhakti Anugerah	2–4, 2–4, 1–4, 5–3, 2–4
Dheo Talatayod / Joseph Arcilla	1–5	Tio Juliandi Hutauruk / Fernando Sanger	4–0, 3–5, 1–4, 1–4, 1–4, 6–8

3 October	Philippines	3–0	Mongolia

Joseph Arcilla / Dheo Talatayod	5–0	Amarkhüügiin Amarbayasgalan / Khürelbayaryn Khaliunbayar	4–0, 4–1, 4–2, 4–1, 4–1
Adjuthor Moralde	4–2	Bataagiin Mönkhtulga	4–1, 5–7, 4–1, 4–0, 1–4, 4–0
Sherwin Nuguit / Samuel Nuguit	5–2	Möngöniin Baljinnyam / Bayarmaagiin Bilgüün	4–0, 4–1, 3–5, 3–5, 5–3, 4–0, 5–3

3 October	Japan	3–0	Indonesia

Hayato Funemizu / Riku Uchida	5–0	Tio Juliandi Hutauruk / Fernando Sanger	4–2, 5–3, 4–2, 4–2, 4–0
Sora Hirooka	4–0	Mario Harley Alibasa	5–3, 5–3, 4–2, 4–2
Takafumi Uchimoto / Toshiki Uematsu	5–0	Sunu Wahyu Trijati / Hemat Bhakti Anugerah	Walkover

=== Knockout round ===
Semifinals			Final
A1	Chinese Taipei	2
B2	Indonesia	0	A1	Chinese Taipei	0
A2	South Korea	0	B1	Japan	2
B1	Japan	2

==== Semifinals ====
4 October	Chinese Taipei	2–0	Indonesia

Yu Kai-wen / Lin Wei-chieh	5–0	Mario Harley Alibasa / Sunu Wahyu Trijati	4–2, 4–2, 4–1, 4–2, 11–9
Chang Yu-sung	4–0	Hemat Bhakti Anugerah	6–4, 9–7, 4–2, 4–1

4 October	South Korea	0–2	Japan

Kim Tae-min / Kim Hyun-soo	2–5	Takafumi Uchimoto / Sora Hirooka	4–2, 3–5, 2–4, 1–4, 6–4, 2–4, 0–4
Yoon Hyoung-wook	3–4	Toshiki Uematsu	2–4, 4–2, 4–0, 2–4, 5–3, 0–4, 4–7

==== Final ====
4 October	Chinese Taipei	0–2	Japan

Yu Kai-wen / Lin Wei-chieh	3–5	Takafumi Uchimoto / Sora Hirooka	3–5, 4–0, 1–4, 1–4, 4–0, 4–1, 0–4, 1–4
Chang Yu-sung	1–4	Toshiki Uematsu	0–4, 4–0, 5–7, 1–4, 1–4
