= Soft tennis at the 2022 Asian Games – Women's team =

Women's team at the 2022 Asian Games
- Venue: Hangzhou Olympic Expo Tennis Center
- Dates: 3–4 October 2023
- Competitors: 46 from 10 nations

Medalists
gold medal	Japan; Haruka Kubo, Kurumi Onoue, Tomomi Shimuta, Noa Takahashi, Emina Watanabe
silver medal	Chinese Taipei; Cheng Chu-ling, Hsu Chiao-ying, Huang Shih-yuan, Kuo Chien-chi, Lo Shu-ting
bronze medal	South Korea; Ji Da-young, Ko Eun-ji, Lee Min-seon, Lim Jin-ah, Mun Hye-gyeong
bronze medal	China; Fu Xiaochen, Li Denglin, Ma Yue

The men's team soft tennis event was part of the soft tennis programme and took place on 3 and 4 October 2023, at the Hangzhou Olympic Center Tennis Center.

== Schedule ==
All times are China Standard Time (UTC+08:00)

Date	Time	Event
Tuesday, 3 October 2023	10:00	Preliminary round
Wednesday, 4 October 2023	10:00	Semifinals
Wednesday, 4 October 2023	10:00	Final

== Results ==
=== Preliminary round ===
==== Group A ====
Pos	Team	Pld	W	L	MF	MA	MD	Qualification
1	Japan	4	4	0	12	0	+12	Semifinals
2	China	4	3	1	6	5	+1	Semifinals
3	India	4	2	2	7	5	+2	
4	Mongolia	4	1	3	3	9	−6	
5	Vietnam	4	0	4	1	10	−9	

Source: ASTF

3 October	Japan	3–0	Vietnam

Noa Takahashi / Emina Watanabe	5–0	Đặng Thị Hạnh / Trần Diễm Ngọc	4–0, 4–0, 4–0, 4–0, 4–0
Kurumi Onoue	4–0	Nguyễn Thị Mai Hương	4–0, 4–1, 4–0, 4–0
Tomomi Shimuta / Haruka Kubo	5–0	—	Walkover

3 October	India	3–0	Mongolia

Tushita Singh / Raga Sri Kulandaivelu	5–1	Ganboldyn Khongorzul / Erdembilegiin Namuunkhüslen	4–0, 4–2, 4–1, 4–0, 1–4, 4–1
Aadhya Tiwari	4–2	Bataagiin Chinmörön	4–2, 0–4, 4–2, 1–4, 6–4, 4–0
Anusha Nelakuditi / Nikita Bishnoi	5–1	Ganzorigiin Enkhlen / Batbayaryn Nandintsetseg	7–5, 1–4, 5–3, 6–4, 4–2, 5–3

3 October	Vietnam	0–2	China

Nguyễn Thị Mai Hương / Đặng Thị Hạnh	0–5	Ma Yue / Fu Xiaochen	1–4, 0–4, 0–4, 1–4, 0–4
Trần Diễm Ngọc	0–4	Li Denglin	2–4, 2–4, 0–4, 2–4
—	—

3 October	Japan	3–0	India

Noa Takahashi / Emina Watanabe	5–2	Tushita Singh / Raga Sri Kulandaivelu	4–1, 4–2, 8–6, 3–5, 2–4, 4–2, 6–4
Kurumi Onoue	4–0	Aadhya Tiwari	4–1, 4–1, 4–1, 4–1
Tomomi Shimuta / Haruka Kubo	5–0	Nikita Bishnoi / Anusha Nelakuditi	4–2, 4–1, 4–0, 4–1, 4–0

3 October	Mongolia	1–2	China

Bataagiin Chinmörön / Erdembilegiin Namuunkhüslen	0–5	Ma Yue / Fu Xiaochen	3–5, 1–4, 4–6, 0–4, 3–5
Ganboldyn Khongorzul	0–4	Li Denglin	2–4, 4–2, 1–4, 2–4, 0–4
Batbayaryn Nandintsetseg / Ganzorigiin Enkhlen	5–0	—	Walkover

3 October	Vietnam	0–3	India

Trần Diễm Ngọc / Nguyễn Thị Mai Hương	1–5	Tushita Singh / Raga Sri Kulandaivelu	1–4, 2–4, 2–4, 6–4, 2–4, 0–4
Đặng Thị Hạnh	0–4	Aadhya Tiwari	0–4, 2–4, 0–4, 2–4
—	0–5	Anusha Nelakuditi / Nikita Bishnoi	Walkover

3 October	Japan	3–0	Mongolia

Noa Takahashi / Emina Watanabe	5–0	Erdembilegiin Namuunkhüslen / Ganboldyn Khongorzul	4–1, 4–1, 4–1, 4–1, 4–0
Kurumi Onoue	4–1	Bataagiin Chinmörön	1–4, 4–2, 4–0, 4–2, 4–1
Tomomi Shimuta / Haruka Kubo	5–0	Ganzorigiin Enkhlen / Batbayaryn Nandintsetseg	Walkover

3 October	India	1–2	China

Tushita Singh / Aadhya Tiwari	1–5	Ma Yue / Fu Xiaochen	1–4, 0–4, 2–4, 5–7, 5–3, 0–4
Raga Sri Kulandaivelu	0–4	Li Denglin	1–4, 3–5, 2–4, 1–4
Anusha Nelakuditi / Nikita Bishnoi	5–0	—	Walkover

3 October	Vietnam	1–2	Mongolia

Nguyễn Thị Mai Hương / Đặng Thị Hạnh	5–0	Ganzorigiin Enkhlen / Batbayaryn Nandintsetseg	4–0, 5–3, 4–1, 4–0, 4–0
Trần Diễm Ngọc	0–4	Bataagiin Chinmörön	0–4, 1–4, 0–4, 0–4
—	0–5	Ganboldyn Khongorzul / Erdembilegiin Namuunkhüslen	Walkover

3 October	Japan	3–0	China

Tomomi Shimuta / Haruka Kubo	5–2	Ma Yue / Fu Xiaochen	4–2, 4–1, 0–4, 4–6, 4–2, 4–2, 4–2
Kurumi Onoue	4–0	Li Denglin	4–2, 4–2, 6–4, 4–2
Noa Takahashi / Emina Watanabe	5–0	—	Walkover

==== Group B ====
Pos	Team	Pld	W	L	MF	MA	MD	Qualification
1	Chinese Taipei	4	4	0	10	2	+8	Semifinals
2	South Korea	4	3	1	8	4	+4	Semifinals
3	Philippines	4	2	2	6	6	0	
4	Cambodia	4	1	3	4	8	−4	
5	Thailand	4	0	4	2	10	−8	

Source: ASTF

3 October	South Korea	3–0	Philippines

Mun Hye-gyeong / Ko Eun-ji	5–1	Bien Zoleta-Mañalac / Princess Catindig	1–4, 4–0, 4–2, 4–2, 4–1, 4–0
Lee Min-seon	4–2	Bambi Zoleta	4–2, 0–4, 4–2, 7–5, 2–4, 4–1
Ji Da-young / Lim Jin-ah	5–2	Virvienica Bejosano / Christy Sañosa	4–2, 0–4, 6–4, 3–5, 4–1, 5–3, 4–2

3 October	Thailand	1–2	Cambodia

Thanpitcha Somsanit / Alisha Ziegler	1–5	Ho Sreynoch / Yean Sokhoeun	2–4, 1–4, 4–0, 3–5, 2–4, 2–4
Praewa Jongjit	2–4	Meth Mariyan	7–5, 1–4, 2–4, 2–4, 4–0, 2–4
Tananchanok Tanarod / Rasita Koolnongdaeng	5–3	Khun Chanroseka / Ki Mengchoung	4–6, 2–4, 2–4, 4–1, 7–5, 4–2, 8–6, 4–0

3 October	Philippines	0–3	Chinese Taipei

Bien Zoleta-Mañalac / Christy Sañosa	0–5	Cheng Chu-ling / Hsu Chiao-ying	1–4, 2–4, 3–5, 4–6, 1–4
Bambi Zoleta	0–4	Lo Shu-ting	0–4, 2–4, 0–4, 1–4
Princess Catindig / Virvienica Bejosano	3–5	Huang Shih-yuan / Kuo Chien-chi	4–2, 0–4, 1–4, 6–4, 2–4, 4–2, 1–4, 0–4

3 October	South Korea	3–0	Thailand

Ji Da-young / Lim Jin-ah	5–4	Praewa Jongjit / Thanpitcha Somsanit	2–4, 3–5, 4–2, 4–0, 4–2, 4–2, 3–5, 5–7, 7–1
Lee Min-seon	4–0	Alisha Ziegler	5–3, 4–0, 4–2, 6–4
Mun Hye-gyeong / Ko Eun-ji	5–1	Tananchanok Tanarod / Rasita Koolnongdaeng	5–3, 1–4, 4–1, 4–1, 4–1, 4–0

3 October	Cambodia	1–2	Chinese Taipei

Khun Chanroseka /Ki Mengchoung	0–5	Cheng Chu-ling / Hsu Chiao-ying	1–4, 0–4, 3–5, 1–4, 0–4
Meth Mariyan	4–3	Lo Shu-ting	1–4, 4–1, 2–4, 0–4, 4–1, 11–9, 7–1
Ho Sreynoch / Yean Sokhoeun	1–5	Huang Shih-yuan / Kuo Chien-chi	2–4, 2–4, 4–2, 2–4, 0–4, 2–4

3 October	Philippines	3–0	Thailand

Princess Catindig / Virvienica Bejosano	5–0	Praewa Jongjit / Thanpitcha Somsanit	4–1, 4–0, 6–4, 4–1, 9–7
Bambi Zoleta	4–2	Alisha Ziegler	4–6, 4–2, 4–1, 6–4, 1–4, 4–0
Bien Zoleta-Mañalac / Christy Sañosa	5–2	Rasita Koolnongdaeng / Tananchanok Tanarod	6–4, 4–1, 4–6, 4–0, 1–4, 4–1, 4–1

3 October	South Korea	2–1	Cambodia

Ji Da-young / Lim Jin-ah	5–2	Ho Sreynoch / Meth Mariyan	2–4, 4–2, 3–5, 7–5, 4–0, 4–0, 4–1
Mun Hye-gyeong	4–0	Yean Sokhoeun	4–2, 4–1, 4–1, 4–0
Lee Min-seon / Ko Eun-ji	0–5	Khun Chanroseka / Ki Mengchoung	Walkover

3 October	Thailand	1–2	Chinese Taipei

Tananchanok Tanarod / Alisha Ziegler	1–5	Huang Shih-yuan / Hsu Chiao-ying	5–3, 0–4, 3–5, 0–4, 1–4, 0–4
Thanpitcha Somsanit	0–4	Cheng Chu-ling	2–4, 2–4, 3–5, 2–4
Rasita Koolnongdaeng / Praewa Jongjit	5–0	Lo Shu-ting / Kuo Chien-chi	Walkover

3 October	Philippines	3–0	Cambodia

Christy Sañosa / Virvienica Bejosano	5–0	Khun Chanroseka / Ki Mengchoung	6–4, 4–2, 5–3, 4–1, 4–2
Bambi Zoleta	4–3	Meth Mariyan	4–1, 4–0, 0–4, 2–4, 4–2, 2–4, 7–2
Princess Catindig / Bien Zoleta-Mañalac	5–0	Ho Sreynoch / Yean Sokhoeun	4–2, 7–5, 4–2, 4–2, 4–1

3 October	South Korea	0–3	Chinese Taipei

Ji Da-young / Lim Jin-ah	4–5	Kuo Chien-chi / Lo Shu-ting	1–4, 4–1, 5–3, 5–3, 5–3, 0–4, 3–5, 2–4, 4–7
Lee Min-seon	0–4	Cheng Chu-ling	0–4, 2–4, 2–4, 3–5
Mun Hye-gyeong / Ko Eun-ji	2–5	Huang Shih-yuan / Hsu Chiao-ying	4–1, 4–1, 3–5, 0–4, 0–4, 0–4, 0–4

=== Knockout round ===
Semifinals			Final
A1	Japan	2
B2	South Korea	0	A1	Japan	2
A2	China	0	B1	Chinese Taipei	1
B1	Chinese Taipei	2

==== Semifinals ====
4 October	Japan	2–0	South Korea

Noa Takahashi / Emina Watanabe	5–4	Ji Da-young / Lim Jin-ah	1–4, 4–2, 4–6, 2–4, 4–2, 2–4, 4–2, 6–4, 7–4
Kurumi Onoue	4–1	Lee Min-seon	4–1, 4–1, 4–2, 2–4, 4–1

4 October	China	0–2	Chinese Taipei

Ma Yue / Fu Xiaochen	2–5	Huang Shih-yuan / Hsu Chiao-ying	4–2, 6–4, 2–4, 1–4, 0–4, 1–4, 5–7
Li Denglin	2–4	Cheng Chu-ling	4–2, 10–12, 4–6, 5–3, 1–4, 2–4

==== Final ====
4 October	Japan	2–1	Chinese Taipei

Noa Takahashi / Emina Watanabe	5–4	Kuo Chien-chi / Lo Shu-ting	4–1, 3–5, 4–0, 8–10, 5–3, 4–1, 1–4, 3–5, 7–3
Kurumi Onoue	2–4	Cheng Chu-ling	4–2, 0–4, 6–4, 1–4, 0–4, 6–8
Tomomi Shimuta / Haruka Kubo	5–3	Huang Shih-yuan / Hsu Chiao-ying	1–4, 2–4, 1–4, 4–1, 4–0, 4–1, 4–1, 7–5
