= Soft tennis at the 2018 Asian Games – Men's singles =

Men's singles at the 2018 Asian Games
- Venue: Jakabaring Tennis Courts
- Dates: 28–29 August 2018
- Competitors: 26 from 13 nations

Medalists
gold medal	Kim Jin-woong	South Korea
silver medal	Elbert Sie	Indonesia
bronze medal	Kim Dong-hoon	South Korea
bronze medal	Prima Simpatiaji	Indonesia

The men's singles soft tennis event was part of the soft tennis programme and took place between August 28 and 29, at the Jakabaring Sport City Tennis Court.

== Schedule ==
All times are Western Indonesia Time (UTC+07:00)

Date	Time	Event
Tuesday, 28 September 2018	09:00	Preliminary round
Wednesday, 29 September 2018	09:00	Quarterfinals
Wednesday, 29 September 2018	10:00	Semifinals
Wednesday, 29 September 2018	11:00	Final

== Results ==
=== Preliminary round ===
==== Group A ====
Pos	Athlete	Pld	W	L	GF	GA	GD	Qualification
1	Kim Dong-hoon (KOR)	2	2	0	8	0	+8	Quarterfinals
2	Noel Damian (PHI)	2	1	1	4	7	−3	
3	Enkhbaataryn Telmen (MGL)	2	0	2	3	8	−5	

Source: OCA

	Score		Game						
	Score		1	2	3	4	5	6	7
Kim Dong-hoon (KOR)	4–0	Noel Damian (PHI)	4–0	5–3	4–0	4–2			
Noel Damian (PHI)	4–3	Enkhbaataryn Telmen (MGL)	0–4	4–0	4–0	0–4	0–4	4–0	7–4
Kim Dong-hoon (KOR)	4–0	Enkhbaataryn Telmen (MGL)	5–3	5–3	4–2	4–0			

==== Group B ====
Pos	Athlete	Pld	W	L	GF	GA	GD	Qualification
1	Koichi Nagae (JPN)	3	3	0	12	3	+9	Quarterfinals
2	Chen Yu-hsun (TPE)	3	2	1	11	5	+6	
3	Palinya Inthalangsy (LAO)	3	1	2	5	8	−3	
4	Trần Văn Chiến (VIE)	3	0	3	0	12	−12	

Source: OCA

	Score		Game						
	Score		1	2	3	4	5	6	7
Chen Yu-hsun (TPE)	4–0	Trần Văn Chiến (VIE)	4–1	4–1	4–2	4–0			
Palinya Inthalangsy (LAO)	0–4	Koichi Nagae (JPN)	0–4	0–4	1–4	0–4			
Chen Yu-hsun (TPE)	4–1	Palinya Inthalangsy (LAO)	4–0	1–4	4–2	4–1	8–6		
Trần Văn Chiến (VIE)	0–4	Koichi Nagae (JPN)	0–4	2–4	1–4	1–4			
Chen Yu-hsun (TPE)	3–4	Koichi Nagae (JPN)	3–5	1–4	2–4	6–4	4–1	4–0	3–7
Trần Văn Chiến (VIE)	0–4	Palinya Inthalangsy (LAO)	1–4	0–4	0–4	2–4			

==== Group C ====
Pos	Athlete	Pld	W	L	GF	GA	GD	Qualification
1	Kim Jin-woong (KOR)	2	2	0	8	0	+8	Quarterfinals
2	Hayato Funemizu (JPN)	2	1	1	4	4	0	
3	Muhammad Yahya (PAK)	2	0	2	0	8	−8	

Source: OCA

	Score		Game						
	Score		1	2	3	4	5	6	7
Hayato Funemizu (JPN)	4–0	Muhammad Yahya (PAK)	4–1	4–1	4–0	4–0			
Muhammad Yahya (PAK)	0–4	Kim Jin-woong (KOR)	0–4	0–4	0–4	1–4			
Hayato Funemizu (JPN)	0–4	Kim Jin-woong (KOR)	2–4	1–4	0–4	2–4			

==== Group D ====
Pos	Athlete	Pld	W	L	GF	GA	GD	Qualification
1	Ri Chung-il (PRK)	2	2	0	8	5	+3	Quarterfinals
2	Chen Tsung-wen (TPE)	2	1	1	7	5	+2	
3	Jitender Singh Mehlda (IND)	2	0	2	3	8	−5	

Source: OCA

	Score		Game						
	Score		1	2	3	4	5	6	7
Chen Tsung-wen (TPE)	4–1	Jitender Singh Mehlda (IND)	4–1	5–3	2–4	4–0	6–4		
Jitender Singh Mehlda (IND)	2–4	Ri Chung-il (PRK)	4–6	1–4	2–4	8–6	4–1	0–4	
Chen Tsung-wen (TPE)	3–4	Ri Chung-il (PRK)	5–3	4–0	6–8	6–4	1–4	0–4	1–7

==== Group E ====
Pos	Athlete	Pld	W	L	GF	GA	GD	Qualification
1	Sorrachet Uayporn (THA)	2	2	0	8	2	+6	Quarterfinals
2	Jay Meena (IND)	2	1	1	5	7	−2	
3	Kann Sophorn (CAM)	2	0	2	4	8	−4	

Source: OCA

	Score		Game						
	Score		1	2	3	4	5	6	7
Sorrachet Uayporn (THA)	4–1	Kann Sophorn (CAM)	4–1	2–4	4–1	6–4	5–3		
Kann Sophorn (CAM)	3–4	Jay Meena (IND)	3–5	5–3	2–4	6–4	3–5	5–3	5–7
Sorrachet Uayporn (THA)	4–1	Jay Meena (IND)	4–2	4–6	4–0	4–1	5–3		

==== Group F ====
Pos	Athlete	Pld	W	L	GF	GA	GD	Qualification
1	Prima Simpatiaji (INA)	2	2	0	8	1	+7	Quarterfinals
2	Bolortuyaagiin Enkhjin (MGL)	2	1	1	5	4	+1	
3	Eibad Sarwar Hussain Khan (PAK)	2	0	2	0	8	−8	

Source: OCA

	Score		Game						
	Score		1	2	3	4	5	6	7
Bolortuyaagiin Enkhjin (MGL)	4–0	Eibad Sarwar Hussain Khan (PAK)	4–2	4–2	4–2	4–1			
Eibad Sarwar Hussain Khan (PAK)	0–4	Prima Simpatiaji (INA)	0–4	2–4	4–6	4–6			
Bolortuyaagiin Enkhjin (MGL)	1–4	Prima Simpatiaji (INA)	4–6	1–4	4–2	2–4	1–4		

==== Group G ====
Pos	Athlete	Pld	W	L	GF	GA	GD	Qualification
1	Elbert Sie (INA)	3	3	0	12	0	+12	Quarterfinals
2	Doeum Samsocheaphearun (CAM)	3	2	1	8	7	+1	
3	Somxay Vannasak (LAO)	3	1	2	5	10	−5	
4	Lê Phước Vĩnh (VIE)	3	0	3	4	12	−8	

Source: OCA

	Score		Game						
	Score		1	2	3	4	5	6	7
Doeum Samsocheaphearun (CAM)	0–4	Elbert Sie (INA)	1–4	1–4	3–5	1–4			
Lê Phước Vĩnh (VIE)	2–4	Somxay Vannasak (LAO)	2–4	4–2	4–1	3–5	2–4	3–5	
Doeum Samsocheaphearun (CAM)	4–2	Lê Phước Vĩnh (VIE)	5–3	2–4	1–4	4–2	4–2	4–1	
Elbert Sie (INA)	4–0	Somxay Vannasak (LAO)	4–0	4–0	4–0	5–3			
Doeum Samsocheaphearun (CAM)	4–1	Somxay Vannasak (LAO)	4–2	6–4	4–1	0–4	5–3		
Elbert Sie (INA)	4–0	Lê Phước Vĩnh (VIE)	4–1	4–1	4–1	4–1			

==== Group H ====
Pos	Athlete	Pld	W	L	GF	GA	GD	Qualification
1	So Je-il (PRK)	2	2	0	8	2	+6	Quarterfinals
2	Chaiwit Leampriboon (THA)	2	1	1	5	7	−2	
3	Joseph Arcilla (PHI)	2	0	2	4	8	−4	

Source: OCA

	Score		Game						
	Score		1	2	3	4	5	6	7
Joseph Arcilla (PHI)	1–4	So Je-il (PRK)	2–4	4–1	1–4	2–4	0–4		
So Je-il (PRK)	4–1	Chaiwit Leampriboon (THA)	6–4	4–1	4–0	4–6	4–2		
Joseph Arcilla (PHI)	3–4	Chaiwit Leampriboon (THA)	2–4	6–4	6–8	4–1	2–4	4–2	5–7

=== Knockout round ===
Quarterfinals
A1	Kim Dong-hoon (KOR)	4	4	4	4
B1	Koichi Nagae (JPN)	2	0	1	0
C1	Kim Jin-woong (KOR)	4	1	4	5	2	8
D1	Ri Chung-il (PRK)	0	4	1	3	4	6
E1	Sorrachet Uayporn (THA)	1	1	2	1
F1	Prima Simpatiaji (INA)	4	4	4	4
G1	Elbert Sie (INA)	4	4	0	4	4
H1	So Je-il (PRK)	2	1	4	1	1

Semifinals
A1	Kim Dong-hoon (KOR)	3	5	0	6	4
C1	Kim Jin-woong (KOR)	5	3	4	8	6
F1	Prima Simpatiaji (INA)	3	4	0	0	0
G1	Elbert Sie (INA)	5	1	4	4	4

Final
C1	Kim Jin-woong (KOR)	5	8	6	4	3	4
G1	Elbert Sie (INA)	3	6	8	1	5	2
