= Soft tennis at the 2022 Asian Games – Men's singles =

Men's singles at the 2022 Asian Games
- Venue: Hangzhou Olympic Expo Tennis Center
- Dates: 6–7 October 2023
- Competitors: 21 from 11 nations

Medalists
gold medal	Toshiki Uematsu	Japan
silver medal	Chang Yu-sung	Chinese Taipei
bronze medal	Yoon Hyoung-wook	South Korea
bronze medal	Chen Yu-hsun	Chinese Taipei

The men's singles soft tennis event was part of the soft tennis programme and took place between 6 and 7 October 2023, at the Hangzhou Olympic Center Tennis Center.

== Schedule ==
All times are China Standard Time (UTC+08:00)

Date	Time	Event
Friday, 6 October 2023	10:00	Preliminary round
Saturday, 7 October 2023	10:00	Second stage
Saturday, 7 October 2023	10:00	Quarterfinals
Saturday, 7 October 2023	10:00	Semifinals
Saturday, 7 October 2023	10:00	Final

== Results ==
Legend

- Ret — Retired
- WO — Won by walkover

=== Preliminary round ===
==== Group A ====
Pos	Athlete	Pld	W	L	GF	GA	GD	Qualification
1	Jay Meena (IND)	2	2	0	8	3	+5	Quarterfinals
2	Chen Yu-hsun (TPE)	2	1	1	6	6	0	Second stage
3	Mario Harley Alibasa (INA)	2	0	2	3	8	−5	

Source: ASTF

	Score		Game						
	Score		1	2	3	4	5	6	7
Chen Yu-hsun (TPE)	4–2	Mario Harley Alibasa (INA)	4–2	4–6	4–6	4–0	4–1	4–2	
Mario Harley Alibasa (INA)	1–4	Jay Meena (IND)	1–4	5–7	4–1	2–4	1–4		
Chen Yu-hsun (TPE)	2–4	Jay Meena (IND)	6–8	4–0	3–5	1–4	4–1	4–6	

==== Group B ====
Pos	Athlete	Pld	W	L	GF	GA	GD	Qualification
1	Yoon Hyoung-wook (KOR)	3	3	0	12	0	+12	Second stage
2	Kawin Yannarit (THA)	3	2	1	8	4	+4	Second stage
3	Say Sochetra (CAM)	3	1	2	4	11	−7	
4	Bataagiin Mönkhtulga (MGL)	3	0	3	3	12	−9	

Source: ASTF

	Score		Game						
	Score		1	2	3	4	5	6	7
Bataagiin Mönkhtulga (MGL)	0–4	Yoon Hyoung-wook (KOR)	1–4	2–4	1–4	1–4			
Say Sochetra (CAM)	0–4	Kawin Yannarit (THA)	1–4	1–4	0–4	2–4			
Bataagiin Mönkhtulga (MGL)	3–4	Say Sochetra (CAM)	5–3	6–8	7–5	4–2	1–4	1–4	4–7
Yoon Hyoung-wook (KOR)	4–0	Kawin Yannarit (THA)	4–2	4–1	4–0	5–3			
Yoon Hyoung-wook (KOR)	4–0	Say Sochetra (CAM)	4–1	4–0	4–1	4–1			
Bataagiin Mönkhtulga (MGL)	0–4	Kawin Yannarit (THA)	1–4	1–4	4–6	1–4			

==== Group C ====
Pos	Athlete	Pld	W	L	GF	GA	GD	Qualification
1	Ri Ryong-hae (PRK)	2	2	0	8	4	+4	Quarterfinals
2	Toshiki Uematsu (JPN)	2	1	1	6	4	+2	Second stage
3	Samuel Nuguit (PHI)	2	0	2	2	8	−6	

Source: ASTF

	Score		Game						
	Score		1	2	3	4	5	6	7
Ri Ryong-hae (PRK)	4–2	Samuel Nuguit (PHI)	0–4	4–2	4–2	4–6	4–0	4–2	
Samuel Nuguit (PHI)	0–4	Toshiki Uematsu (JPN)	3–5	2–4	1–4	0–4			
Ri Ryong-hae (PRK)	4–2	Toshiki Uematsu (JPN)	2–4	4–2	2–4	4–2	4–2	4–0	

==== Group D ====
Pos	Athlete	Pld	W	L	GF	GA	GD	Qualification
1	Kim Tae-min (KOR)	3	3	0	12	2	+10	Quarterfinals
2	Sunu Wahyu Trijati (INA)	3	2	1	8	7	+1	Second stage
3	Han Song-ryong (PRK)	3	1	2	7	10	−3	
4	Anawat Geraprasitt (THA)	3	0	3	4	12	−8	

Source: ASTF

	Score		Game						
	Score		1	2	3	4	5	6	7
Kim Tae-min (KOR)	4–0	Sunu Wahyu Trijati (INA)	4–2	4–1	4–1	4–2			
Anawat Geraprasitt (THA)	2–4	Han Song-ryong (PRK)	5–3	6–4	1–4	3–5	1–4	1–4	
Kim Tae-min (KOR)	4–1	Anawat Geraprasitt (THA)	2–4	4–1	5–3	4–1	8–6		
Sunu Wahyu Trijati (INA)	4–2	Han Song-ryong (PRK)	4–2	1–4	4–1	3–5	4–0	4–1	
Sunu Wahyu Trijati (INA)	4–1	Anawat Geraprasitt (THA)	6–4	2–4	4–1	4–0	4–0		
Kim Tae-min (KOR)	4–1	Han Song-ryong (PRK)	4–1	4–1	4–0	1–4	4–2		

==== Group E ====
Pos	Athlete	Pld	W	L	GF	GA	GD	Qualification
1	Hayato Funemizu (JPN)	3	3	0	8	0	+8	Second stage
2	Chang Yu-sung (TPE)	3	2	1	4	5	−1	Second stage
3	Doeum Samsocheaphearun (CAM)	3	1	2	2	8	−6	
4	Bayarmaagiin Bilgüün (MGL)	3	0	3	0	1	−1	

Source: ASTF

	Score		Game						
	Score		1	2	3	4	5	6	7
Chang Yu-sung (TPE)	0–4	Hayato Funemizu (JPN)	4–6	0–4	3–5	6–8			
Bayarmaagiin Bilgüün (MGL)	Ret	Doeum Samsocheaphearun (CAM)	0–4	0–0					
Chang Yu-sung (TPE)	WO	Bayarmaagiin Bilgüün (MGL)							
Hayato Funemizu (JPN)	4–0	Doeum Samsocheaphearun (CAM)	4–2	4–0	6–4	4–1			
Hayato Funemizu (JPN)	WO	Bayarmaagiin Bilgüün (MGL)							
Chang Yu-sung (TPE)	4–1	Doeum Samsocheaphearun (CAM)	4–2	4–6	4–1	5–3	4–1		

==== Group F ====
Pos	Athlete	Pld	W	L	GF	GA	GD	Qualification
1	Adjuthor Moralde (PHI)	2	2	0	8	0	+8	Quarterfinals
2	Aniket Patel (IND)	2	1	1	4	4	0	Second stage
3	Nguyễn Nhật Quang (VIE)	2	0	2	0	8	−8	

Source: ASTF

	Score		Game						
	Score		1	2	3	4	5	6	7
Nguyễn Nhật Quang (VIE)	0–4	Adjuthor Moralde (PHI)	5–7	1–4	0–4	0–4			
Adjuthor Moralde (PHI)	4–0	Aniket Patel (IND)	4–1	4–0	4–0	5–3			
Nguyễn Nhật Quang (VIE)	0–4	Aniket Patel (IND)	0–4	2–4	2–4	2–4			

=== Knockout round ===
==== Final ====
Final
E2	Chang Yu-sung (TPE)	3	2	2	1
C2	Toshiki Uematsu (JPN)	5	4	4	4

==== Top half ====
Second stage								Quarterfinals							Semifinals
								A1	Jay Meena (IND)	0	4	3	6	1
E2	Chang Yu-sung (TPE)	4	4	4	4			E2	Chang Yu-sung (TPE)	4	6	5	4	4
F2	Aniket Patel (IND)	1	1	1	1										E2	Chang Yu-sung (TPE)	1	4	6	8	4	2	7
B1	Yoon Hyoung-wook (KOR)	1	4	4	4	2	7								B1	Yoon Hyoung-wook (KOR)	4	1	4	10	0	4	3
D2	Sunu Wahyu Trijati (INA)	4	1	2	0	4	5	B1	Yoon Hyoung-wook (KOR)	4	4	7	9
								C1	Ri Ryong-hae (PRK)	2	0	5	7

==== Bottom half ====
Second stage									Quarterfinals								Semifinals
									D1	Kim Tae-min (KOR)	3	7	2	3	4	2
E1	Hayato Funemizu (JPN)	4	4	2	9	3	2	4	C2	Toshiki Uematsu (JPN)	5	5	4	5	1	4
C2	Toshiki Uematsu (JPN)	1	1	4	7	5	4	7									C2	Toshiki Uematsu (JPN)	4	4	2	2	4	1	7
A2	Chen Yu-hsun (TPE)	2	4	4	4	4											A2	Chen Yu-hsun (TPE)	0	2	4	4	2	4	4
B2	Kawin Yannarit (THA)	4	2	0	1	1			A2	Chen Yu-hsun (TPE)	4	4	4	6
									F1	Adjuthor Moralde (PHI)	2	1	0	4
