= Soft tennis at the 2022 Asian Games – Women's singles =

Women's singles at the 2022 Asian Games
- Venue: Hangzhou Olympic Expo Tennis Center
- Dates: 6–7 October 2023
- Competitors: 23 from 12 nations

Medalists
| gold medal | Mun Hye-gyeong | South Korea |
| silver medal | Noa Takahashi | Japan |
| bronze medal | Li Denglin | China |
| bronze medal | Ma Yue | China |

The women's singles soft tennis event was part of the soft tennis programme and took place between 6 and 7 October 2023, at the Hangzhou Olympic Center Tennis Center.

== Schedule ==
All times are China Standard Time (UTC+08:00)

| Date | Time | Event |
|---|---|---|
| Friday, 6 October 2023 | 10:00 | Preliminary round |
| Saturday, 7 October 2023 | 10:00 | Quarterfinals |
| Saturday, 7 October 2023 | 10:00 | Semifinals |
| Saturday, 7 October 2023 | 10:00 | Final |

== Results ==
=== Preliminary round ===
==== Group A ====
| Pos | Athlete | Pld | W | L | GF | GA | GD | Qualification |
|---|---|---|---|---|---|---|---|---|
| 1 | Noa Takahashi (JPN) | 1 | 1 | 0 | 4 | 0 | +4 | Quarterfinals |
| 2 | Bataagiin Chinmörön (MGL) | 1 | 0 | 1 | 0 | 4 | −4 | |

Source: ASTF

| | Score | | Game | | | | | | |
| | Score | | 1 | 2 | 3 | 4 | 5 | 6 | 7 |
|---|---|---|---|---|---|---|---|---|---|
| Noa Takahashi (JPN) | 4–0 | Bataagiin Chinmörön (MGL) | 4–0 | 4–1 | 4–0 | 4–0 | | | |

==== Group B ====
| Pos | Athlete | Pld | W | L | GF | GA | GD | Qualification |
|---|---|---|---|---|---|---|---|---|
| 1 | Lee Min-seon (KOR) | 2 | 2 | 0 | 8 | 0 | +8 | Quarterfinals |
| 2 | Lo Shu-ting (TPE) | 2 | 1 | 1 | 4 | 5 | −1 | |
| 3 | Aadhya Tiwari (IND) | 2 | 0 | 2 | 1 | 8 | −7 | |

Source: ASTF

| | Score | | Game | | | | | | |
| | Score | | 1 | 2 | 3 | 4 | 5 | 6 | 7 |
|---|---|---|---|---|---|---|---|---|---|
| Lee Min-seon (KOR) | 4–0 | Aadhya Tiwari (IND) | 4–1 | 4–0 | 4–1 | 4–2 | | | |
| Aadhya Tiwari (IND) | 1–4 | Lo Shu-ting (TPE) | 2–4 | 0–4 | 4–1 | 0–4 | 2–4 | | |
| Lee Min-seon (KOR) | 4–0 | Lo Shu-ting (TPE) | 6–4 | 4–2 | 4–1 | 4–1 | | | |

==== Group C ====
| Pos | Athlete | Pld | W | L | GF | GA | GD | Qualification |
|---|---|---|---|---|---|---|---|---|
| 1 | Li Denglin (CHN) | 2 | 2 | 0 | 8 | 2 | +6 | Quarterfinals |
| 2 | Yean Sokhoeun (CAM) | 2 | 1 | 1 | 4 | 4 | 0 | |
| 3 | Đặng Thị Hạnh (VIE) | 2 | 0 | 2 | 2 | 8 | −6 | |

Source: ASTF

| | Score | | Game | | | | | | |
| | Score | | 1 | 2 | 3 | 4 | 5 | 6 | 7 |
|---|---|---|---|---|---|---|---|---|---|
| Li Denglin (CHN) | 4–0 | Yean Sokhoeun (CAM) | 4–1 | 4–2 | 4–0 | 4–1 | | | |
| Yean Sokhoeun (CAM) | 4–0 | Đặng Thị Hạnh (VIE) | 4–1 | 7–5 | 5–3 | 5–3 | | | |
| Li Denglin (CHN) | 4–2 | Đặng Thị Hạnh (VIE) | 4–1 | 4–2 | 4–6 | 0–4 | 4–1 | 4–1 | |

==== Group D ====
| Pos | Athlete | Pld | W | L | GF | GA | GD | Qualification |
|---|---|---|---|---|---|---|---|---|
| 1 | Dwi Rahayu Pitri (INA) | 2 | 2 | 0 | 8 | 3 | +5 | Quarterfinals |
| 2 | Bambi Zoleta (PHI) | 2 | 1 | 1 | 7 | 4 | +3 | |
| 3 | Thanpitcha Somsanit (THA) | 2 | 0 | 2 | 0 | 8 | −8 | |

Source: ASTF

| | Score | | Game | | | | | | |
| | Score | | 1 | 2 | 3 | 4 | 5 | 6 | 7 |
|---|---|---|---|---|---|---|---|---|---|
| Dwi Rahayu Pitri (INA) | 4–3 | Bambi Zoleta (PHI) | 4–0 | 3–5 | 2–4 | 3–5 | 4–0 | 4–0 | 7–4 |
| Bambi Zoleta (PHI) | 4–0 | Thanpitcha Somsanit (THA) | 4–2 | 4–2 | 4–0 | 4–1 | | | |
| Dwi Rahayu Pitri (INA) | 4–0 | Thanpitcha Somsanit (THA) | 4–1 | 4–1 | 4–1 | 4–0 | | | |

==== Group E ====
| Pos | Athlete | Pld | W | L | GF | GA | GD | Qualification |
|---|---|---|---|---|---|---|---|---|
| 1 | Ma Yue (CHN) | 2 | 2 | 0 | 8 | 0 | +8 | Quarterfinals |
| 2 | Praewa Jongjit (THA) | 2 | 1 | 1 | 4 | 7 | −3 | |
| 3 | Erdembilegiin Namuunkhüslen (MGL) | 2 | 0 | 2 | 3 | 8 | −5 | |

Source: ASTF

| | Score | | Game | | | | | | |
| | Score | | 1 | 2 | 3 | 4 | 5 | 6 | 7 |
|---|---|---|---|---|---|---|---|---|---|
| Ma Yue (CHN) | 4–0 | Erdembilegiin Namuunkhüslen (MGL) | 4–1 | 5–3 | 4–0 | 4–0 | | | |
| Erdembilegiin Namuunkhüslen (MGL) | 3–4 | Praewa Jongjit (THA) | 2–4 | 4–1 | 1–4 | 4–2 | 2–4 | 4–2 | 2–7 |
| Ma Yue (CHN) | 4–0 | Praewa Jongjit (THA) | 4–0 | 4–0 | 6–4 | 4–2 | | | |

==== Group F ====
| Pos | Athlete | Pld | W | L | GF | GA | GD | Qualification |
|---|---|---|---|---|---|---|---|---|
| 1 | Raga Sri Kulandaivelu (IND) | 2 | 2 | 0 | 8 | 1 | +7 | Quarterfinals |
| 2 | Ki Mengchoung (CAM) | 2 | 1 | 1 | 5 | 4 | +1 | |
| 3 | Nguyễn Thị Mai Hương (VIE) | 2 | 0 | 2 | 0 | 8 | −8 | |

Source: ASTF

| | Score | | Game | | | | | | |
| | Score | | 1 | 2 | 3 | 4 | 5 | 6 | 7 |
|---|---|---|---|---|---|---|---|---|---|
| Ki Mengchoung (CAM) | 1–4 | Raga Sri Kulandaivelu (IND) | 4–6 | 2–4 | 4–2 | 1–4 | 2–4 | | |
| Raga Sri Kulandaivelu (IND) | 4–0 | Nguyễn Thị Mai Hương (VIE) | 6–4 | 4–2 | 5–3 | 4–2 | | | |
| Ki Mengchoung (CAM) | 4–0 | Nguyễn Thị Mai Hương (VIE) | 10–8 | 4–2 | 4–1 | 4–0 | | | |

==== Group G ====
| Pos | Athlete | Pld | W | L | GF | GA | GD | Qualification |
|---|---|---|---|---|---|---|---|---|
| 1 | Mun Hye-gyeong (KOR) | 2 | 2 | 0 | 8 | 2 | +6 | Quarterfinals |
| 2 | Princess Catindig (PHI) | 2 | 1 | 1 | 4 | 6 | −2 | |
| 3 | Allif Nafiiah (INA) | 2 | 0 | 2 | 4 | 8 | −4 | |

Source: ASTF

| | Score | | Game | | | | | | |
| | Score | | 1 | 2 | 3 | 4 | 5 | 6 | 7 |
|---|---|---|---|---|---|---|---|---|---|
| Allif Nafiiah (INA) | 2–4 | Princess Catindig (PHI) | 1–4 | 2–4 | 5–3 | 4–2 | 4–6 | 2–4 | |
| Princess Catindig (PHI) | 0–4 | Mun Hye-gyeong (KOR) | 5–7 | 3–5 | 0–4 | 0–4 | | | |
| Allif Nafiiah (INA) | 2–4 | Mun Hye-gyeong (KOR) | 0–4 | 1–4 | 5–3 | 5–3 | 1–4 | 2–4 | |

==== Group H ====
| Pos | Athlete | Pld | W | L | GF | GA | GD | Qualification |
|---|---|---|---|---|---|---|---|---|
| 1 | Kurumi Onoue (JPN) | 2 | 1 (Note: Tied on head-to-head wins (1). Head-to-head game difference: JPN +2, TPE −1, PRK −1. Head-to-head point difference: TPE +4, PRK −4.) | 1 | 7 | 5 | +2 | Quarterfinals |
| 2 | Cheng Chu-ling (TPE) | 2 | 1 | 1 | 5 | 6 | −1 | |
| 3 | Ri Jin-mi (PRK) | 2 | 1 | 1 | 6 | 7 | −1 | |

Source: ASTF
Notes:

| | Score | | Game | | | | | | |
| | Score | | 1 | 2 | 3 | 4 | 5 | 6 | 7 |
|---|---|---|---|---|---|---|---|---|---|
| Cheng Chu-ling (TPE) | 1–4 | Kurumi Onoue (JPN) | 4–1 | 4–6 | 2–4 | 2–4 | 1–4 | | |
| Kurumi Onoue (JPN) | 3–4 | Ri Jin-mi (PRK) | 0–4 | 4–2 | 4–2 | 2–4 | 4–2 | 1–4 | 4–7 |
| Cheng Chu-ling (TPE) | 4–2 | Ri Jin-mi (PRK) | 4–1 | 2–4 | 4–0 | 4–6 | 4–1 | 4–0 | |

=== Knockout round ===
Quarterfinals
A1 | Noa Takahashi (JPN) | 3 | 2 | 3 | 4 | 4 | 4 | 7
B1 | Lee Min-seon (KOR) | 5 | 4 | 5 | 1 | 2 | 1 | 1
C1 | Li Denglin (CHN) | 4 | 1 | 4 | 2 | 4 | 5
D1 | Dwi Rahayu Pitri (INA) | 2 | 4 | 2 | 4 | 2 | 3
E1 | Ma Yue (CHN) | 2 | 4 | 4 | 5 | 4
F1 | Raga Sri Kulandaivelu (IND) | 4 | 2 | 1 | 3 | 1
G1 | Mun Hye-gyeong (KOR) | 1 | 4 | 4 | 5 | 2 | 4
H1 | Kurumi Onoue (JPN) | 4 | 0 | 2 | 3 | 4 | 1

Semifinals
A1 | Noa Takahashi (JPN) | 3 | 5 | 4 | 6 | 4
C1 | Li Denglin (CHN) | 5 | 3 | 1 | 4 | 1
E1 | Ma Yue (CHN) | 1 | 4 | 2 | 0
G1 | Mun Hye-gyeong (KOR) | 4 | 6 | 4 | 4

Final
A1 | Noa Takahashi (JPN) | 2 | 2 | 0 | 0
G1 | Mun Hye-gyeong (KOR) | 4 | 4 | 4 | 4
