= Soft tennis at the 2018 Asian Games – Men's team =

Men's team at the 2018 Asian Games
- Venue: Jakabaring Tennis Courts
- Dates: 31 August – 1 September 2018
- Competitors: 56 from 12 nations

Medalists
gold medal	South Korea; Jeon Jee-heon, Kim Beom-jun, Kim Dong-hoon, Kim Jin-woong, Kim Ki-sung
silver medal	Japan; Hayato Funemizu, Taimei Marunaka, Kento Masuda, Koichi Nagae, Toshiki Uematsu
bronze medal	Indonesia; Hemat Bhakti Anugerah, Irfandi Hendrawan, Gusti Jaya Kusuma, Elbert Sie, Prima Simpatiaji
bronze medal	Chinese Taipei; Chen Tsung-wen, Chen Yu-hsun, Kuo Chien-chun, Lin Wei-chieh, Yu Kai-wen

The men's team soft tennis event was part of the soft tennis programme and took place on August 31 and September 1, at the JSC - Tennis Court. South Korea clinched the gold medal in this event after beat Japan team in the final.

== Schedule ==
All times are Western Indonesia Time (UTC+07:00)

Date	Time	Event
Friday, 31 August 2018	09:00	Preliminary round
Saturday, 1 September 2018	09:00	Quarterfinals
Saturday, 1 September 2018	11:30	Semifinals
Saturday, 1 September 2018	14:00	Final

== Results ==
=== Preliminary round ===
==== Group A ====
Pos	Team	Pld	W	L	MF	MA	MD	Qualification
1	South Korea	3	3	0	9	0	+9	Semifinals
2	Philippines	3	2	1	4	5	−1	Quarterfinals
3	Laos	3	1	2	4	5	−1	
4	Pakistan	3	0	3	1	8	−7	

Source: OCA

31 August	South Korea	3–0	Pakistan

Kim Dong-hoon / Kim Ki-sung	5–0	Eibad Sarwar Hussain Khan / Muhammad Usama Saeed	4–0, 4–0, 4–0, 4–0, 4–0
Kim Jin-woong	4–0	Muhammad Nauman Aftab	4–0, 4–2, 4–1, 4–0
Jeon Jee-heon / Kim Beom-jun	5–0	Muhammad Ahmed Ehtisham / Muhammad Yahya	5–3, 4–1, 4–0, 4–0, 4–1

31 August	Laos	1–2	Philippines

Somxay Vannasak / Anandone Khamphoumy	2–5	Noel Damian / Mac Alcoseba	4–6, 2–4, 3–5, 4–2, 4–0, 2–4, 1–4
Palinya Inthalangsy	0–4	Joseph Arcilla	4–6, 0–4, 3–5, 3–5
Khanthanou Phongsavanh / Chittakone Xaiyalin	5–0	—	Walkover

31 August	South Korea	3–0	Laos

Jeon Jee-heon / Kim Ki-sung	5–0	Anandone Khamphoumy / Chittakone Xaiyalin	4–0, 7–5, 5–3, 4–2, 4–2
Kim Jin-woong	4–0	Somxay Vannasak	5–3, 4–0, 4–2, 4–1
Kim Dong-hoon / Kim Beom-jun	5–0	Khanthanou Phongsavanh / Palinya Inthalangsy	4–0, 4–2, 4–0, 4–2, 4–0

31 August	Pakistan	1–2	Philippines

Muhammad Yahya / Eibad Sarwar Hussain Khan	1–5	Noel Damian / Mac Alcoseba	2–4, 0–4, 4–0, 4–6, 2–4, 1–4
Muhammad Nauman Aftab	0–4	Joseph Arcilla	0–4, 2–4, 0–4, 1–4
Muhammad Usama Saeed / Muhammad Ahmed Ehtisham	5–0	—	Walkover

31 August	South Korea	3–0	Philippines

Kim Dong-hoon / Kim Beom-jun	5–1	Noel Damian / Mac Alcoseba	0–4, 4–2, 5–3, 4–1, 4–0, 4–1
Kim Jin-woong	4–0	Joseph Arcilla	4–0, 4–2, 4–2, 4–1
Jeon Jee-heon / Kim Ki-sung	5–0	—	Walkover

31 August	Pakistan	0–3	Laos

Muhammad Usama Saeed / Muhammad Ahmed Ehtisham	0–5	Khanthanou Phongsavanh / Somxay Vannasak	0–4, 4–6, 1–4, 0–4, 0–4
Eibad Sarwar Hussain Khan	1–4	Chittakone Xaiyalin	3–5, 4–1, 0–4, 2–4, 0–4
Muhammad Nauman Aftab / Muhammad Yahya	2–5	Anandone Khamphoumy / Palinya Inthalangsy	0–4, 1–4, 2–4, 1–4, 4–1, 4–2, 3–5

==== Group B ====
Pos	Team	Pld	W	L	MF	MA	MD	Qualification
1	Chinese Taipei	3	3	0	8	1	+7	Quarterfinals
2	Mongolia	3	2	1	5	4	+1	Quarterfinals
3	Thailand	3	1	2	5	4	+1	
4	Vietnam	3	0	3	0	9	−9	

Source: OCA

31 August	Chinese Taipei	3–0	Mongolia

Chen Tsung-wen / Kuo Chien-chun	5–1	Tsogbadrakhyn Bilgüün / Gantulgyn Enkhtüvshin	4–1, 2–4, 4–1, 9–7, 4–2, 4–0
Chen Yu-hsun	4–2	Enkhbaataryn Telmen	9–7, 3–5, 2–4, 4–1, 4–1, 4–1
Yu Kai-wen / Lin Wei-chieh	5–1	Bolortuyaagiin Enkhjin / Altankhuyagiin Damdin	4–1, 2–4, 4–1, 9–7, 4–2, 4–0

31 August	Vietnam	0–3	Thailand

Lâm Quang Trí / Lê Phước Vĩnh	2–5	Worranun Ratthapobkorrapak / Worrawoot Philuek	1–4, 3–5, 4–2, 3–5, 5–3, 1–4, 3–5
Trần Văn Chiến	0–4	Chaiwit Leampriboon	0–4, 0–4, 1–4, 0–4
—	0–5	Sorrachet Uayporn / Kawin Yannarit	Walkover

31 August	Chinese Taipei	3–0	Vietnam

Chen Tsung-wen / Kuo Chien-chun	5–0	Lâm Quang Trí / Lê Phước Vĩnh	4–2, 4–2, 4–0, 4–0, 4–2
Chen Yu-hsun	4–0	Trần Văn Chiến	4–2, 4–2, 4–0, 4–0
Yu Kai-wen / Lin Wei-chieh	5–0	—	Walkover

31 August	Mongolia	2–1	Thailand

Bolortuyaagiin Enkhjin / Altankhuyagiin Damdin	1–5	Worranun Ratthapobkorrapak / Sorrachet Uayporn	4–2, 2–4, 3–5, 0–4, 2–4, 6–8
Enkhbaataryn Telmen	4–0	Chaiwit Leampriboon	2–4, 10–8, 4–1, 4–0, 4–1
Tsogbadrakhyn Bilgüün / Gantulgyn Enkhtüvshin	5–4	Worrawoot Philuek / Kawin Yannarit	2–4, 1–4, 2–4, 3–5, 4–2, 4–2, 4–2, 4–2, 7–5

31 August	Chinese Taipei	2–1	Thailand

Yu Kai-wen / Lin Wei-chieh	5–0	Worranun Ratthapobkorrapak / Worrawoot Philuek	4–2, 4–0, 4–2, 4–2, 4–1
Chen Yu-hsun	1–4	Sorrachet Uayporn	3–5, 4–0, 1–4, 2–4, 5–7
Kuo Chien-chun / Chen Tsung-wen	5–3	Kawin Yannarit / Chaiwit Leampriboon	0–4, 4–1, 6–4, 4–1, 2–4, 2–4, 4–0, 4–1

31 August	Mongolia	3–0	Vietnam

Tsogbadrakhyn Bilgüün / Gantulgyn Enkhtüvshin	5–0	Lâm Quang Trí / Lê Phước Vĩnh	4–0, 4–2, 4–2, 4–2, 4–2
Bolortuyaagiin Enkhjin	4–0	Trần Văn Chiến	4–2, 4–1, 4–1, 4–2
Enkhbaataryn Telmen / Altankhuyagiin Damdin	5–0	—	Walkover

==== Group C ====
Pos	Team	Pld	W	L	MF	MA	MD	Qualification
1	Japan	3	3	0	9	0	+9	Semifinals
2	Indonesia	3	2	1	6	3	+3	Quarterfinals
3	Cambodia	3	1	2	3	6	−3	
4	India	3	0	3	0	9	−9	

Source: OCA

31 August	Japan	3–0	Indonesia

Taimei Marunaka / Koichi Nagae	5–2	Prima Simpatiaji / Irfandi Hendrawan	4–0, 4–1, 3–5, 4–6, 4–2, 4–0, 4–2
Hayato Funemizu	4–1	Elbert Sie	2–4, 4–2, 4–0, 4–2, 6–4
Kento Masuda / Toshiki Uematsu	5–1	Hemat Bhakti Anugerah / Gusti Jaya Kusuma	7–5, 7–5, 4–6, 4–2, 4–1, 4–0

31 August	Cambodia	3–0	India

Orn Sambath / Ek Chamroeun	5–4	Aniket Patel / Rohit Dhiman	2–4, 1–4, 3–5, 4–1, 4–1, 7–5, 4–1, 3–5, 7–5
Doeum Samsocheaphearun	4–2	Jay Meena	4–2, 2–4, 1–4, 4–2, 7–5, 4–1
Kann Sophorn / Yi Sarsarith	5–3	Jitender Singh Mehlda / Kamlesh Kumar Shukla	4–6, 1–4, 5–3, 4–2, 3–5, 5–3, 4–2, 4–2

31 August	Japan	3–0	Cambodia

Taimei Marunaka / Koichi Nagae	5–0	Kann Sophorn / Doeum Samsocheaphearun	4–0, 4–2, 5–3, 4–0, 4–0
Hayato Funemizu	4–0	Yi Sarsarith	4–0, 4–0, 4–0, 4–0
Kento Masuda / Toshiki Uematsu	5–0	Ek Chamroeun / Orn Sambath	7–5, 4–1, 4–1, 4–1, 4–1

31 August	Indonesia	3–0	India

Elbert Sie / Prima Simpatiaji	5–2	Rohit Dhiman / Jay Meena	2–4, 4–1, 2–4, 4–1, 4–1, 4–0, 4–2
Irfandi Hendrawan	4–0	Aniket Patel	4–0, 6–4, 4–1, 4–2
Hemat Bhakti Anugerah / Gusti Jaya Kusuma	5–0	Jitender Singh Mehlda / Kamlesh Kumar Shukla	Walkover

31 August	Japan	3–0	India

Kento Masuda / Toshiki Uematsu	5–0	Jay Meena / Kamlesh Kumar Shukla	5–3, 4–1, 4–0, 4–2, 4–0
Hayato Funemizu	4–0	Rohit Dhiman	4–0, 4–1, 4–1, 4–0
Taimei Marunaka / Koichi Nagae	5–1	Aniket Patel / Jitender Singh Mehlda	6–4, 4–1, 5–7, 4–1, 4–1, 4–1

31 August	Indonesia	3–0	Cambodia

Prima Simpatiaji / Elbert Sie	5–3	Kann Sophorn / Doeum Samsocheaphearun	4–2, 4–2, 2–4, 4–2, 1–4, 2–4, 4–1, 4–2
Irfandi Hendrawan	4–0	Yi Sarsarith	4–1, 4–1, 4–2, 4–1
Gusti Jaya Kusuma / Hemat Bhakti Anugerah	5–3	Ek Chamroeun / Orn Sambath	4–2, 0–4, 4–1, 3–5, 4–2, 0–4, 5–3, 4–0

=== Knockout round ===
Quarterfinals			Semifinals			Final
			A1	South Korea	2
C2	Indonesia	2	C2	Indonesia	0
B2	Mongolia	0				A1	South Korea	2
B1	Chinese Taipei	2				C1	Japan	0
A2	Philippines	0	B1	Chinese Taipei	0
			C1	Japan	2

==== Quarterfinals ====
1 September	Indonesia	2–0	Mongolia

Prima Simpatiaji / Irfandi Hendrawan	5–0	Enkhbaataryn Telmen / Altankhuyagiin Damdin	4–1, 4–0, 4–0, 4–1, 4–0
Elbert Sie	4–1	Bolortuyaagiin Enkhjin	4–1, 1–4, 4–0, 4–2, 4–0

1 September	Chinese Taipei	2–0	Philippines

Kuo Chien-chun / Chen Tsung-wen	5–1	Noel Damian / Mac Alcoseba	4–0, 4–1, 5–3, 6–8, 4–2, 4–1
Chen Yu-hsun	4–0	Joseph Arcilla	4–2, 4–0, 4–2, 4–0

==== Semifinals ====
1 September	South Korea	2–0	Indonesia

Kim Dong-hoon / Kim Beom-jun	5–0	Prima Simpatiaji / Irfandi Hendrawan	5–3, 4–1, 4–2, 4–2, 4–2
Kim Jin-woong	4–2	Elbert Sie	5–3, 5–3, 0–4, 6–4, 0–4, 4–2

1 September	Chinese Taipei	0–2	Japan

Yu Kai-wen / Lin Wei-chieh	0–5	Kento Masuda / Toshiki Uematsu	1–4, 2–4, 5–7, 2–4, 1–4
Chen Yu-hsun	3–4	Hayato Funemizu	1–4, 4–0, 4–2, 2–4, 4–2, 3–5, 4–7

==== Final ====
1 September	South Korea	2–0	Japan

Kim Dong-hoon / Kim Beom-jun	5–2	Taimei Marunaka / Koichi Nagae	4–1, 3–5, 4–1, 2–4, 8–6, 5–3, 6–4
Kim Jin-woong	4–2	Hayato Funemizu	5–3, 2–4, 4–2, 2–4, 7–5, 8–6
