= Soft tennis at the 2018 Asian Games – Women's team =

Women's team at the 2018 Asian Games
- Venue: Jakabaring Tennis Courts
- Dates: 31 August – 1 September 2018
- Competitors: 48 from 10 nations

Medalists
| gold medal | Japan; Misaki Hangai, Riko Hayashida, Rurika Kuroki, Kurumi Onoue, Noa Takahashi |
| silver medal | South Korea; Baek Seol, Kim Ji-yeon, Kim Young-hai, Mun Hye-gyeong, Yoo Ye-seul |
| bronze medal | China; Feng Zixuan, Liu Yin, Ma Yue, Wang Yufei, Yu Yuanyi |
| bronze medal | Chinese Taipei; Chan Chia-hsin, Cheng Chu-ling, Huang Shih-yuan, Kuo Chien-chi, Lee Ching-wen |

The women's team soft tennis event was part of the soft tennis programme and took place on August 31 and September 1, at the JSC - Tennis Court. Japanese women's team clinched the gold medal in this event after beat the South Korean team in the final.

== Schedule ==
All times are Western Indonesia Time (UTC+07:00)

| Date | Time | Event |
|---|---|---|
| Friday, 31 August 2018 | 09:00 | Preliminary round |
| Saturday, 1 September 2018 | 09:00 | Quarterfinals |
| Saturday, 1 September 2018 | 11:30 | Semifinals |
| Saturday, 1 September 2018 | 15:00 | Final |

== Results ==
=== Preliminary round ===
==== Group A ====
| Pos | Team | Pld | W | L | MF | MA | MD | Qualification |
|---|---|---|---|---|---|---|---|---|
| 1 | South Korea | 3 | 3 | 0 | 9 | 0 | +9 | Semifinals |
| 2 | Thailand | 3 | 2 | 1 | 6 | 3 | +3 | Quarterfinals |
| 3 | India | 3 | 1 | 2 | 3 | 6 | −3 | |
| 4 | Mongolia | 3 | 0 | 3 | 0 | 9 | −9 | |

Source: OCA

| 31 August | South Korea | 3–0 | Thailand |

Mun Hye-gyeong / Baek Seol | 5–0 | Sawitre Naree / Thatdao Bunteng | 4–2, 4–0, 4–1, 4–0, 4–1
Kim Ji-yeon | 4–0 | Dares Srirungreang | 4–2, 4–2, 10–8, 5–3
Kim Young-hai / Yoo Ye-seul | 5–3 | Natchatjira Kerdsomboon / Sunatcha Kraiya | 4–1, 7–5, 5–7, 1–4, 4–1, 1–4, 5–3, 4–1

| 31 August | India | 3–0 | Mongolia |

Namita Seth / Aadhya Tiwari | 5–3 | Bulgany Norovsüren / Turbatyn Iveel | 2–4, 5–7, 5–7, 4–1, 4–2, 4–0, 4–2, 4–2
Abhilasha Mehra | 4–1 | Bataagiin Chinmörön | 4–2, 4–1, 4–1, 5–7, 4–1
Shubh Gulati / Saayana Prakash | 5–0 | — | Walkover

| 31 August | South Korea | 3–0 | India |

Mun Hye-gyeong / Baek Seol | 5–0 | Shubh Gulati / Saayana Prakash | 4–2, 4–0, 4–2, 4–0, 4–2
Kim Ji-yeon | 4–0 | Abhilasha Mehra | 5–3, 4–1, 4–2, 4–0
Kim Young-hai / Yoo Ye-seul | 5–1 | Namita Seth / Aadhya Tiwari | 4–1, 4–1, 4–6, 4–1, 4–2, 7–5

| 31 August | Thailand | 3–0 | Mongolia |

Sawitre Naree / Natchatjira Kerdsomboon | 5–0 | Bataagiin Chinmörön / Turbatyn Iveel | 4–0, 4–1, 4–1, 4–1, 4–0
Dares Srirungreang | 4–0 | Bulgany Norovsüren | 4–2, 4–2, 4–2, 5–3
Thatdao Bunteng / Sunatcha Kraiya | 5–0 | — | Walkover

| 31 August | South Korea | 3–0 | Mongolia |

Kim Young-hai / Yoo Ye-seul | 5–0 | Turbatyn Iveel / Bataagiin Chinmörön | 4–0, 4–1, 4–0, 4–2, 4–2
Kim Ji-yeon | 4–0 | Bulgany Norovsüren | 4–2, 4–0, 4–0, 4–2
Mun Hye-gyeong / Baek Seol | 5–0 | — | Walkover

| 31 August | Thailand | 3–0 | India |

Sawitre Naree / Thatdao Bunteng | 5–2 | Namita Seth / Aadhya Tiwari | 4–2, 2–4, 2–4, 5–3, 4–0, 4–2, 4–2
Dares Srirungreang | 4–0 | Abhilasha Mehra | 4–2, 4–1, 4–1, 5–3
Natchatjira Kerdsomboon / Sunatcha Kraiya | 5–0 | Shubh Gulati / Saayana Prakash | 4–0, 4–1, 4–0, 4–0, 4–2

==== Group B ====
| Pos | Team | Pld | W | L | MF | MA | MD | Qualification |
|---|---|---|---|---|---|---|---|---|
| 1 | Chinese Taipei | 2 | 2 | 0 | 5 | 1 | +4 | Quarterfinals |
| 2 | China | 2 | 1 | 1 | 4 | 2 | +2 | Quarterfinals |
| 3 | Philippines | 2 | 0 | 2 | 0 | 6 | −6 | |

Source: OCA

| 31 August | Chinese Taipei | 2–1 | China |

Cheng Chu-ling / Chan Chia-hsin | 4–5 | Feng Zixuan / Wang Yufei | 8–6, 5–3, 4–2, 5–3, 2–4, 1–4, 3–5, 2–4, 6–8
Kuo Chien-chi | 4–0 | Yu Yuanyi | 7–5, 4–1, 4–0, 4–0
Lee Ching-wen / Huang Shih-yuan | 5–2 | Liu Yin / Ma Yue | 4–0, 4–0, 4–2, 3–5, 4–2, 1–4, 4–0

| 31 August | China | 3–0 | Philippines |

Feng Zixuan / Wang Yufei | 5–1 | Khyshana Hitosis / Jamaica Daquio | 4–2, 4–0, 5–3, 4–0, 0–4, 6–4
Yu Yuanyi | 4–0 | Bien Zoleta-Mañalac | 8–6, 7–5, 4–2, 5–3
Ma Yue / Liu Yin | 5–2 | Guia Arzaga / Princess Catindig | 4–2, 3–5, 4–1, 2–4, 4–1, 7–5, 4–1

| 31 August | Chinese Taipei | 3–0 | Philippines |

Kuo Chien-chi / Chan Chia-hsin | 5–0 | Khyshana Hitosis / Jamaica Daquio | 4–1, 4–1, 5–3, 4–0, 4–0
Huang Shih-yuan | 4–1 | Bien Zoleta-Mañalac | 4–1, 4–2, 2–4, 4–1, 4–0
Cheng Chu-ling / Lee Ching-wen | 5–0 | Guia Arzaga / Princess Catindig | 4–0, 5–3, 5–3, 4–1, 4–0

==== Group C ====
| Pos | Team | Pld | W | L | MF | MA | MD | Qualification |
|---|---|---|---|---|---|---|---|---|
| 1 | Japan | 2 | 2 | 0 | 6 | 0 | +6 | Semifinals |
| 2 | Indonesia | 2 | 1 | 1 | 3 | 3 | 0 | Quarterfinals |
| 3 | Pakistan | 2 | 0 | 2 | 0 | 6 | −6 | |

Source: OCA

| 31 August | Japan | 3–0 | Indonesia |

Noa Takahashi / Misaki Hangai | 5–2 | Dede Tari Kusrini / Anadeleyda Kawengian | 4–1, 5–3, 4–6, 4–6, 4–1, 4–0, 4–0
Kurumi Onoue | 4–1 | Siti Nur Arasy | 4–2, 2–4, 4–1, 4–1, 4–1
Riko Hayashida / Rurika Kuroki | 5–0 | Dwi Rahayu Pitri / Voni Darlina | 4–2, 6–4, 4–1, 4–2, 6–4

| 31 August | Indonesia | 3–0 | Pakistan |

Dede Tari Kusrini / Anadeleyda Kawengian | 5–0 | Syeda Eraj Batool Zaidi / Varisha Khan | 4–0, 4–0, 4–0, 4–1, 4–0
Voni Darlina | 4–0 | Marium Shahid | 4–1, 4–0, 4–0, 4–1
Dwi Rahayu Pitri / Siti Nur Arasy | 5–0 | — | Walkover

| 31 August | Japan | 3–0 | Pakistan |

Noa Takahashi / Misaki Hangai | 5–0 | Syeda Eraj Batool Zaidi / Varisha Khan | 4–1, 4–0, 4–1, 4–0, 4–0
Kurumi Onoue | 4–0 | Marium Shahid | 4–0, 4–0, 4–0, 4–2
Riko Hayashida / Rurika Kuroki | 5–0 | — | Walkover

=== Knockout round ===
| Quarterfinals | | | Semifinals | | | Final |
| | | | A1 | South Korea | 2 |
| C2 | Indonesia | 0 | B2 | China | 0 |
| B2 | China | 2 | | | | A1 | South Korea | 1 |
| B1 | Chinese Taipei | 2 | | | | C1 | Japan | 2 |
| A2 | Thailand | 0 | B1 | Chinese Taipei | 0 |
| | | | C1 | Japan | 2 |

==== Quarterfinals ====
| 1 September | Indonesia | 0–2 | China |

Dede Tari Kusrini / Anadeleyda Kawengian | 2–5 | Feng Zixuan / Wang Yufei | 0–4, 6–4, 1–4, 1–4, 4–6, 4–2, 2–4
Dwi Rahayu Pitri | 1–4 | Yu Yuanyi | 2–4, 6–8, 1–4, 4–2, 3–5

| 1 September | Chinese Taipei | 2–0 | Thailand |

Kuo Chien-chi / Chan Chia-hsin | 5–3 | Sawitre Naree / Natchatjira Kerdsomboon | 0–4, 8–6, 4–2, 4–2, 3–5, 1–4, 4–1, 4–1
Huang Shih-yuan | 4–0 | Dares Srirungreang | 4–0, 10–8, 4–1, 5–3

==== Semifinals ====
| 1 September | South Korea | 2–0 | China |

Mun Hye-gyeong / Baek Seol | 5–4 | Feng Zixuan / Wang Yufei | 4–2, 2–4, 4–0, 2–4, 4–2, 4–1, 1–4, 2–4, 7–3
Kim Ji-yeon | 4–0 | Yu Yuanyi | 4–2, 6–4, 4–2, 4–2

| 1 September | Chinese Taipei | 0–2 | Japan |

Kuo Chien-chi / Chan Chia-hsin | 2–5 | Riko Hayashida / Rurika Kuroki | 4–1, 5–3, 4–6, 3–5, 1–4, 0–4, 2–4
Cheng Chu-ling | 2–4 | Kurumi Onoue | 2–4, 4–6, 4–2, 1–4, 5–3, 0–4

==== Final ====
| 1 September | South Korea | 1–2 | Japan |

Mun Hye-gyeong / Baek Seol | 4–5 | Noa Takahashi / Misaki Hangai | 4–1, 3–5, 4–0, 4–2, 1–4, 1–4, 1–4, 4–0, 8–10
Kim Ji-yeon | 4–1 | Kurumi Onoue | 4–2, 4–1, 1–4, 4–0, 4–0
Kim Young-hai / Yoo Ye-seul | 2–5 | Riko Hayashida / Rurika Kuroki | 4–2, 0–4, 0–4, 2–4, 5–3, 2–4, 1–4

== Non-participating athletes ==
- Möngöntsetsegiin Anudari (MGL)
- Boldbaataryn Sevjidmaa (MGL)
