= Soft tennis at the 2018 Asian Games – Mixed doubles =

Mixed doubles at the 2018 Asian Games
- Venue: Jakabaring Tennis Courts
- Dates: 29–30 August 2018
- Competitors: 50 from 13 nations

Medalists
gold medal	Yu Kai-wen; Cheng Chu-ling	Chinese Taipei
silver medal	Kim Ki-sung; Mun Hye-gyeong	South Korea
bronze medal	Kim Beom-jun; Kim Ji-yeon	South Korea
bronze medal	Toshiki Uematsu; Riko Hayashida	Japan

The mixed doubles soft tennis event was part of the soft tennis programme and took place between August 29 and 30, at the Jakabaring Sport City Tennis Court. Yu Kai-wen and Cheng Chu-ling of Chinese Taipei won the gold medal in this event.

== Schedule ==
All times are Western Indonesia Time (UTC+07:00)

Date	Time	Event
Wednesday, 29 August 2018	14:30	Preliminary round
Thursday, 30 August 2018	10:00	Quarterfinals
Thursday, 30 August 2018	11:00	Semifinals
Thursday, 30 August 2018	13:30	Final

== Results ==
Legend

- WO — Won by walkover

=== Preliminary round ===
==== Group A ====
Pos	Team	Pld	W	L	GF	GA	GD	Qualification
1	Kim Beom-jun (KOR) Kim Ji-yeon (KOR)	2	2	0	10	2	+8	Quarterfinals
2	Worranun Ratthapobkorrapak (THA) Sawitre Naree (THA)	2	1	1	6	8	−2	
3	Yi Sarsarith (CAM) Meth Mariyan (CAM)	2	0	2	4	10	−6	

Source: OCA

	Score		Game								
	Score		1	2	3	4	5	6	7	8	9
Kim Beom-jun (KOR); Kim Ji-yeon (KOR)	5–1	Worranun Ratthapobkorrapak (THA); Sawitre Naree (THA)	4–1	4–2	4–0	3–5	4–1	4–0			
Worranun Ratthapobkorrapak (THA); Sawitre Naree (THA)	5–3	Yi Sarsarith (CAM); Meth Mariyan (CAM)	4–2	2–4	4–2	4–1	5–3	2–4	0–4	4–1	
Kim Beom-jun (KOR); Kim Ji-yeon (KOR)	5–1	Yi Sarsarith (CAM); Meth Mariyan (CAM)	4–0	4–0	4–0	4–0	2–4	4–0			

==== Group B ====
Pos	Team	Pld	W	L	GF	GA	GD	Qualification
1	So Je-il (PRK) Kim Mi-hyang (PRK)	3	3	0	15	4	+11	Quarterfinals
2	Hemat Bhakti Anugerah (INA) Voni Darlina (INA)	3	2	1	12	9	+3	
3	Mac Alcoseba (PHI) Princess Catindig (PHI)	3	1	2	11	12	−1	
4	Lâm Quang Trí (VIE) Trần Thanh Hoàng Ngân (VIE)	3	0	3	2	15	−13	

Source: OCA

	Score		Game								
	Score		1	2	3	4	5	6	7	8	9
So Je-il (PRK); Kim Mi-hyang (PRK)	5–0	Lâm Quang Trí (VIE); Trần Thanh Hoàng Ngân (VIE)	4–0	4–0	4–0	4–1	4–0				
Mac Alcoseba (PHI); Princess Catindig (PHI)	4–5	Hemat Bhakti Anugerah (INA); Voni Darlina (INA)	2–4	4–0	1–4	3–5	1–4	4–2	4–0	6–4	3–7
So Je-il (PRK); Kim Mi-hyang (PRK)	5–2	Mac Alcoseba (PHI); Princess Catindig (PHI)	4–2	5–3	5–7	4–0	4–6	6–4	6–4		
Lâm Quang Trí (VIE); Trần Thanh Hoàng Ngân (VIE)	0–5	Hemat Bhakti Anugerah (INA); Voni Darlina (INA)	1–4	2–4	4–6	0–4	2–4				
So Je-il (PRK); Kim Mi-hyang (PRK)	5–2	Hemat Bhakti Anugerah (INA); Voni Darlina (INA)	1–4	5–3	0–4	4–1	5–3	4–2	4–1		
Lâm Quang Trí (VIE); Trần Thanh Hoàng Ngân (VIE)	2–5	Mac Alcoseba (PHI); Princess Catindig (PHI)	3–5	4–2	4–2	0–4	0–4	2–4	1–4		

==== Group C ====
Pos	Team	Pld	W	L	GF	GA	GD	Qualification
1	Yu Kai-wen (TPE) Cheng Chu-ling (TPE)	2	2	0	10	0	+10	Quarterfinals
2	Chittakone Xaiyalin (LAO) Phonesamai Champamanivong (LAO)	2	1	1	5	8	−3	
3	Rohit Dhiman (IND) Aadhya Tiwari (IND)	2	0	2	3	10	−7	

Source: OCA

	Score		Game								
	Score		1	2	3	4	5	6	7	8	9
Yu Kai-wen (TPE); Cheng Chu-ling (TPE)	5–0	Rohit Dhiman (IND); Aadhya Tiwari (IND)	4–0	4–0	4–0	4–1	4–2				
Rohit Dhiman (IND); Aadhya Tiwari (IND)	3–5	Chittakone Xaiyalin (LAO); Phonesamai Champamanivong (LAO)	7–5	1–4	5–3	1–4	4–0	2–4	1–4	1–4	
Yu Kai-wen (TPE); Cheng Chu-ling (TPE)	5–0	Chittakone Xaiyalin (LAO); Phonesamai Champamanivong (LAO)	4–2	4–2	4–0	4–0	4–1				

==== Group D ====
Pos	Team	Pld	W	L	GF	GA	GD	Qualification
1	Kento Masuda (JPN) Rurika Kuroki (JPN)	2	2	0	10	2	+8	Quarterfinals
2	Bolortuyaagiin Enkhjin (MGL) Bulgany Norovsüren (MGL)	2	1	1	7	6	+1	
3	Muhammad Ahmed Ehtisham (PAK) Syeda Eraj Batool Zaidi (PAK)	2	0	2	1	10	−9	

Source: OCA

	Score		Game								
	Score		1	2	3	4	5	6	7	8	9
Bolortuyaagiin Enkhjin (MGL); Bulgany Norovsüren (MGL)	2–5	Kento Masuda (JPN); Rurika Kuroki (JPN)	6–4	4–6	0–4	5–3	4–6	2–4	0–4		
Kento Masuda (JPN); Rurika Kuroki (JPN)	5–0	Muhammad Ahmed Ehtisham (PAK); Syeda Eraj Batool Zaidi (PAK)	4–1	4–2	4–2	4–1	5–3				
Bolortuyaagiin Enkhjin (MGL); Bulgany Norovsüren (MGL)	5–1	Muhammad Ahmed Ehtisham (PAK); Syeda Eraj Batool Zaidi (PAK)	1–4	4–0	4–0	4–1	4–1	4–0			

==== Group E ====
Pos	Team	Pld	W	L	GF	GA	GD	Qualification
1	Chaiwit Leampriboon (THA) Thatdao Bunteng (THA)	2	2	0	10	2	+8	Quarterfinals
2	Noel Damian (PHI) Bien Zoleta-Mañalac (PHI)	2	1	1	5	6	−1	
3	Orn Sambath (CAM) Rin Sotheary (CAM)	2	0	2	3	10	−7	

Source: OCA

	Score		Game								
	Score		1	2	3	4	5	6	7	8	9
Noel Damian (PHI); Bien Zoleta-Mañalac (PHI)	5–1	Orn Sambath (CAM); Rin Sotheary (CAM)	4–0	4–1	4–0	4–0	2–4	4–0			
Orn Sambath (CAM); Rin Sotheary (CAM)	2–5	Chaiwit Leampriboon (THA); Thatdao Bunteng (THA)	4–2	2–4	0–4	1–4	4–2	0–4	1–4		
Noel Damian (PHI); Bien Zoleta-Mañalac (PHI)	0–5	Chaiwit Leampriboon (THA); Thatdao Bunteng (THA)	3–5	2–4	1–4	6–8	2–4				

==== Group F ====
Pos	Team	Pld	W	L	GF	GA	GD	Qualification
1	Toshiki Uematsu (JPN) Riko Hayashida (JPN)	2	2	0	5	0	+5	Quarterfinals
2	Aniket Patel (IND) Namita Seth (IND)	2	1	1	0	5	−5	
3	Altankhuyagiin Damdin (MGL) Möngöntsetsegiin Anudari (MGL)	2	0	2	0	0	0	

Source: OCA

	Score		Game								
	Score		1	2	3	4	5	6	7	8	9
Aniket Patel (IND); Namita Seth (IND)	WO	Altankhuyagiin Damdin (MGL); Möngöntsetsegiin Anudari (MGL)									
Altankhuyagiin Damdin (MGL); Möngöntsetsegiin Anudari (MGL)	WO	Toshiki Uematsu (JPN); Riko Hayashida (JPN)									
Aniket Patel (IND); Namita Seth (IND)	0–5	Toshiki Uematsu (JPN); Riko Hayashida (JPN)	0–4	0–4	1–4	0–4	0–4				

==== Group G ====
Pos	Team	Pld	W	L	GF	GA	GD	Qualification
1	Kuo Chien-chun (TPE) Kuo Chien-chi (TPE)	2	2	0	10	1	+9	Quarterfinals
2	Irfandi Hendrawan (INA) Dede Tari Kusrini (INA)	2	1	1	6	5	+1	
3	Muhammad Nauman Aftab (PAK) Marium Shahid (PAK)	2	0	2	0	10	−10	

Source: OCA

	Score		Game								
	Score		1	2	3	4	5	6	7	8	9
Irfandi Hendrawan (INA); Dede Tari Kusrini (INA)	5–0	Muhammad Nauman Aftab (PAK); Marium Shahid (PAK)	4–0	4–2	4–2	5–3	4–0				
Muhammad Nauman Aftab (PAK); Marium Shahid (PAK)	0–5	Kuo Chien-chun (TPE); Kuo Chien-chi (TPE)	0–4	0–4	1–4	0–4	0–4				
Irfandi Hendrawan (INA); Dede Tari Kusrini (INA)	1–5	Kuo Chien-chun (TPE); Kuo Chien-chi (TPE)	5–3	0–4	2–4	0–4	0–4	1–4			

==== Group H ====
Pos	Team	Pld	W	L	GF	GA	GD	Qualification
1	Kim Ki-sung (KOR) Mun Hye-gyeong (KOR)	2	2	0	5	0	+5	Quarterfinals
2	Somxay Vannasak (LAO) Aliya Maniphone (LAO)	2	1	1	0	5	−5	
3	Ri Chung-il (PRK) Hong Ji-sun (PRK)	2	0	2	0	0	0	

Source: OCA

	Score		Game								
	Score		1	2	3	4	5	6	7	8	9
Kim Ki-sung (KOR); Mun Hye-gyeong (KOR)	WO	Ri Chung-il (PRK); Hong Ji-sun (PRK)									
Ri Chung-il (PRK); Hong Ji-sun (PRK)	WO	Somxay Vannasak (LAO); Aliya Maniphone (LAO)									
Kim Ki-sung (KOR); Mun Hye-gyeong (KOR)	5–0	Somxay Vannasak (LAO); Aliya Maniphone (LAO)	4–1	4–0	4–0	4–1	4–0				

=== Knockout round ===
Quarterfinals
A1	Kim Beom-jun (KOR); Kim Ji-yeon (KOR)	4	1	7	5	4	4
B1	So Je-il (PRK); Kim Mi-hyang (PRK)	2	4	5	3	2	0
C1	Yu Kai-wen (TPE); Cheng Chu-ling (TPE)	3	4	4	5	1	4	5
D1	Kento Masuda (JPN); Rurika Kuroki (JPN)	5	2	2	3	4	0	3
E1	Chaiwit Leampriboon (THA); Thatdao Bunteng (THA)	2	1	0	0	2
F1	Toshiki Uematsu (JPN); Riko Hayashida (JPN)	4	4	4	4	4
G1	Kuo Chien-chun (TPE); Kuo Chien-chi (TPE)	3	4	1	2	4	4	1
H1	Kim Ki-sung (KOR); Mun Hye-gyeong (KOR)	5	2	4	4	6	1	4

Semifinals
A1	Kim Beom-jun (KOR); Kim Ji-yeon (KOR)	2	1	4	2	1	0
C1	Yu Kai-wen (TPE); Cheng Chu-ling (TPE)	4	4	1	4	4	4
F1	Toshiki Uematsu (JPN); Riko Hayashida (JPN)	1	5	4	1	6	5	0	0
H1	Kim Ki-sung (KOR); Mun Hye-gyeong (KOR)	4	3	6	4	4	3	4	4

Final
C1	Yu Kai-wen (TPE); Cheng Chu-ling (TPE)	4	1	2	4	4	2	4	4
H1	Kim Ki-sung (KOR); Mun Hye-gyeong (KOR)	1	4	4	1	2	4	2	0
