= Soft tennis at the 2018 Asian Games =

- Venue: Jakabaring Tennis Court
- Dates: 28 August – 1 September 2018
- Competitors: 113 from 14 nations

Soft tennis at the 2018 Asian Games was held at the JSC Tennis Court, Palembang, Indonesia. It was held from 28 August to 1 September 2018.

Soft tennis had team and singles events for men and women, as well as a mixed doubles competition.

== Schedule ==
P	Preliminary round	¼	Quarterfinals	½	Semifinals	F	Final

Event↓/Date →	28th Tue	29th Wed			30th Thu			31st Fri	1st Sat		
Men's singles	P	¼	½	F							
Men's team								P	¼	½	F
Women's singles	P	¼	½	F							
Women's team								P	¼	½	F
Mixed doubles		P			¼	½	F				

== Medalists ==
Event	Gold	Silver	Bronze
Men's singles	Kim Jin-woong; South Korea	Elbert Sie; Indonesia	Kim Dong-hoon; South Korea
Men's singles	Kim Jin-woong; South Korea	Elbert Sie; Indonesia	Prima Simpatiaji; Indonesia
Men's team	South Korea; Jeon Jee-heon; Kim Beom-jun; Kim Dong-hoon; Kim Jin-woong; Kim Ki-sung	Japan; Hayato Funemizu; Taimei Marunaka; Kento Masuda; Koichi Nagae; Toshiki Uematsu	Indonesia; Hemat Bhakti Anugerah; Irfandi Hendrawan; Gusti Jaya Kusuma; Elbert Sie; Prima Simpatiaji
Men's team	South Korea; Jeon Jee-heon; Kim Beom-jun; Kim Dong-hoon; Kim Jin-woong; Kim Ki-sung	Japan; Hayato Funemizu; Taimei Marunaka; Kento Masuda; Koichi Nagae; Toshiki Uematsu	Chinese Taipei; Chen Tsung-wen; Chen Yu-hsun; Kuo Chien-chun; Lin Wei-chieh; Yu Kai-wen
Women's singles	Noa Takahashi; Japan	Cheng Chu-ling; Chinese Taipei	Yu Yuanyi; China
Women's singles	Noa Takahashi; Japan	Cheng Chu-ling; Chinese Taipei	Dwi Rahayu Pitri; Indonesia
Women's team	Japan; Misaki Hangai; Riko Hayashida; Rurika Kuroki; Kurumi Onoue; Noa Takahashi	South Korea; Baek Seol; Kim Ji-yeon; Kim Young-hai; Mun Hye-gyeong; Yoo Ye-seul	China; Feng Zixuan; Liu Yin; Ma Yue; Wang Yufei; Yu Yuanyi
Women's team	Japan; Misaki Hangai; Riko Hayashida; Rurika Kuroki; Kurumi Onoue; Noa Takahashi	South Korea; Baek Seol; Kim Ji-yeon; Kim Young-hai; Mun Hye-gyeong; Yoo Ye-seul	Chinese Taipei; Chan Chia-hsin; Cheng Chu-ling; Huang Shih-yuan; Kuo Chien-chi; Lee Ching-wen
Mixed doubles	Chinese Taipei; Yu Kai-wen; Cheng Chu-ling	South Korea; Kim Ki-sung; Mun Hye-gyeong	South Korea; Kim Beom-jun; Kim Ji-yeon
Mixed doubles	Chinese Taipei; Yu Kai-wen; Cheng Chu-ling	South Korea; Kim Ki-sung; Mun Hye-gyeong	Japan; Toshiki Uematsu; Riko Hayashida

== Medal table ==
Rank	Nation	Gold	Silver	Bronze	Total
1	South Korea (KOR)	2	2	2	6
2	Japan (JPN)	2	1	1	4
3	Chinese Taipei (TPE)	1	1	2	4
4	Indonesia (INA)	0	1	3	4
5	China (CHN)	0	0	2	2
Totals (5 entries)		5	5	10	20

== Participating nations ==
A total of 113 athletes from 14 nations competed in soft tennis at the 2018 Asian Games:

- Cambodia (7)
- China (5)
- Chinese Taipei (10)
- India (10)
- Indonesia (10)
- Japan (10)
- Laos (7)
- Mongolia (10)
- North Korea (4)
- Pakistan (8)
- Philippines (8)
- South Korea (10)
- Thailand (10)
- Vietnam (4)
