= Sam Chankaby =

Cambodian soft tennis player

Personal information
- Native name: សំ ចាន់កាប៊ី
- Full name: Sam Chankaby
- Nationality: Cambodian
- Home town: Phnom Penh, Cambodia

Sport
- Country: Cambodia
- Sport: Soft tennis
Medal record
Representing Cambodia
SEA Games
Gold medal – first place	2023 Cambodia	Mixed doubles

Sam Chankaby (Khmer: សំ ចាន់កាប៊ី) is a Cambodian soft tennis player. He is the gold medalist at the 2023 SEA Games.

== Career ==
He participated in the 1st Asian Junior Soft Tennis Championship under-15 category. In the men's singles, he topped the group stage and advanced to the next stage, where he lost to a South Korean player. In the men's doubles, he and Say Sochetra finished first in the group stage and lost to Chinese Taipei 3–4 in the semifinals, earning a bronze medal.

At the 2023 SEA Games, he and Khun Chanroseka won the gold medal at the mixed doubles event after defeating their compatriots Ho Srey Nouch and Say Sochetra 5–2 in the final.

At the Korea Cup International Soft Tennis Tournament 2023 held in Incheon, South Korea, he won a bronze medal in the men's singles event.
