= Toshiki Uematsu =

Japanese soft tennis player

Toshiki Uematsu 上松 俊貴
Personal information
- Native name: 上松俊貴
- Nationality: Japanese
- Born: 11 June 1998 (age 28) Okayama, Japan

Sport
- Country: Japan
- Sport: Soft tennis
- Position: Regular footed
Medal record
Soft tennis
Representing Japan
Asian Games
Gold medal – first place	2022 Hangzhou	Singles
Gold medal – first place	2022 Hangzhou	Team
Gold medal – first place	2022 Hangzhou	Mixed doubles
Gold medal – first place	2026 Nagoya	Team
Silver medal – second place	2018 Palembang	Team
Bronze medal – third place	2018 Palembang	Mixed doubles

Toshiki Uematsu (上松俊貴, Uematsu Toshiki; born 11 June 1998) is a Japanese soft tennis player.

He is the gold medalist at the 2022 Asian Games in men's singles, men's team, and mixed doubles events. With three gold medals, he is the most successful Japanese athlete at the games.
