= Soft tennis at the 2022 Asian Games =

- Venue: Hangzhou Olympic Expo Tennis Center
- Dates: 3–7 October 2023
- Competitors: 97 from 12 nations

Soft tennis at the 2022 Asian Games was held at the Hangzhou Olympic Center Tennis Center, Hangzhou, China from 3 to 7 October 2023.

Soft tennis had team and singles events for men and women, as well as a mixed doubles competition.

== Schedule ==
P	Preliminary rounds	¼	Quarterfinals	½	Semifinals	F	Final

Event↓/Date →	3rd Tue	4th Wed		5th Thu				6th Fri	7th Sat			
Men's singles								P	P	¼	½	F
Men's team	P	½	F									
Women's singles								P	¼		½	F
Women's team	P	½	F									
Mixed doubles				P	¼	½	F					

== Medalists ==
Event	Gold	Silver	Bronze
Men's singles	Toshiki Uematsu; Japan	Chang Yu-sung; Chinese Taipei	Yoon Hyoung-wook; South Korea
Men's singles	Toshiki Uematsu; Japan	Chang Yu-sung; Chinese Taipei	Chen Yu-hsun; Chinese Taipei
Men's team	Japan; Hayato Funemizu; Sora Hirooka; Riku Uchida; Takafumi Uchimoto; Toshiki Uematsu	Chinese Taipei; Chang Yu-sung; Chen Po-yi; Chen Yu-hsun; Lin Wei-chieh; Yu Kai-wen	Indonesia; Mario Harley Alibasa; Hemat Bhakti Anugerah; Tio Juliandi Hutauruk; Fernando Sanger; Sunu Wahyu Trijati
Men's team	Japan; Hayato Funemizu; Sora Hirooka; Riku Uchida; Takafumi Uchimoto; Toshiki Uematsu	Chinese Taipei; Chang Yu-sung; Chen Po-yi; Chen Yu-hsun; Lin Wei-chieh; Yu Kai-wen	South Korea; Kim Byung-gook; Kim Hyun-soo; Kim Tae-min; Lee Hyeon-su; Yoon Hyoung-wook
Women's singles	Mun Hye-gyeong; South Korea	Noa Takahashi; Japan	Li Denglin; China
Women's singles	Mun Hye-gyeong; South Korea	Noa Takahashi; Japan	Ma Yue; China
Women's team	Japan; Haruka Kubo; Kurumi Onoue; Tomomi Shimuta; Noa Takahashi; Emina Watanabe	Chinese Taipei; Cheng Chu-ling; Hsu Chiao-ying; Huang Shih-yuan; Kuo Chien-chi; Lo Shu-ting	South Korea; Ji Da-young; Ko Eun-ji; Lee Min-seon; Lim Jin-ah; Mun Hye-gyeong
Women's team	Japan; Haruka Kubo; Kurumi Onoue; Tomomi Shimuta; Noa Takahashi; Emina Watanabe	Chinese Taipei; Cheng Chu-ling; Hsu Chiao-ying; Huang Shih-yuan; Kuo Chien-chi; Lo Shu-ting	China; Fu Xiaochen; Li Denglin; Ma Yue
Mixed doubles	Japan; Toshiki Uematsu; Noa Takahashi	Japan; Riku Uchida; Tomomi Shimuta	Chinese Taipei; Lin Wei-chieh; Huang Shih-yuan
Mixed doubles	Japan; Toshiki Uematsu; Noa Takahashi	Japan; Riku Uchida; Tomomi Shimuta	South Korea; Kim Hyun-soo; Mun Hye-gyeong

== Medal table ==
Rank	Nation	Gold	Silver	Bronze	Total
1	Japan (JPN)	4	2	0	6
2	South Korea (KOR)	1	0	4	5
3	Chinese Taipei (TPE)	0	3	2	5
4	China (CHN)	0	0	3	3
5	Indonesia (INA)	0	0	1	1
Totals (5 entries)		5	5	10	20

== Participating nations ==
A total of 97 athletes from 12 nations competed in soft tennis at the 2022 Asian Games:

- Cambodia (10)
- China (3)
- Chinese Taipei (10)
- India (10)
- Indonesia (7)
- Japan (10)
- Mongolia (10)
- North Korea (3)
- Philippines (10)
- South Korea (10)
- Thailand (10)
- Vietnam (4)

== Mixed doubles ==
Mixed doubles at the 2022 Asian Games
- Venue: Hangzhou Olympic Expo Tennis Center
- Dates: 5 October 2023
- Competitors: 40 from 11 nations

Medalists
gold medal	Toshiki Uematsu; Noa Takahashi	Japan
silver medal	Riku Uchida; Tomomi Shimuta	Japan
bronze medal	Lin Wei-chieh; Huang Shih-yuan	Chinese Taipei
bronze medal	Kim Hyun-soo; Mun Hye-gyeong	South Korea

The mixed doubles soft tennis event took place on 5 October 2023 at the Hangzhou Olympic Center Tennis Center.

=== Schedule ===
All times are China Standard Time (UTC+08:00)

Date	Time	Event
Thursday, 5 October 2023	10:00	Preliminary round
Thursday, 5 October 2023	10:00	Second stage
Thursday, 5 October 2023	10:00	Quarterfinals
Thursday, 5 October 2023	10:00	Semifinals
Thursday, 5 October 2023	10:00	Final

=== Results ===
==== Preliminary round ====
===== Group A =====
Pos	Team	Pld	W	L	GF	GA	GD	Qualification
1	Yu Kai-wen (TPE) Cheng Chu-ling (TPE)	2	2	0	10	2	+8	Quarterfinals
2	Dheo Talatayod (PHI) Bien Zoleta-Mañalac (PHI)	2	1	1	6	8	−2	Second stage
3	Jay Meena (IND) Aadhya Tiwari (IND)	2	0	2	4	10	−6	

Source: ASTF

	Score		Game								
	Score		1	2	3	4	5	6	7	8	9
Yu Kai-wen (TPE); Cheng Chu-ling (TPE)	5–1	Jay Meena (IND); Aadhya Tiwari (IND)	4–2	4–1	5–3	4–0	4–6	12–10			
Jay Meena (IND); Aadhya Tiwari (IND)	3–5	Dheo Talatayod (PHI); Bien Zoleta-Mañalac (PHI)	4–2	3–5	4–2	4–6	4–1	2–4	4–6	5–7	
Yu Kai-wen (TPE); Cheng Chu-ling (TPE)	5–1	Dheo Talatayod (PHI); Bien Zoleta-Mañalac (PHI)	5–3	5–3	0–4	4–1	4–1	4–2			

===== Group B =====
Pos	Team	Pld	W	L	GF	GA	GD	Qualification
1	Kim Byung-gook (KOR) Ji Da-young (KOR)	3	3	0	15	2	+13	Second stage
2	Han Song-ryong (PRK) Ri Jin-mi (PRK)	3	2	1	12	7	+5	Second stage
3	Sippakorn Thong-ngiu (THA) Thanpitcha Somsanit (THA)	3	1	2	7	10	−3	
4	Bayarmaagiin Bilgüün (MGL) Ganboldyn Khongorzul (MGL)	3	0	3	0	15	−15	

Source: ASTF

	Score		Game								
	Score		1	2	3	4	5	6	7	8	9
Kim Byung-gook (KOR); Ji Da-young (KOR)	5–2	Han Song-ryong (PRK); Ri Jin-mi (PRK)	4–1	4–1	2–4	4–2	4–1	2–4	4–2		
Sippakorn Thong-ngiu (THA); Thanpitcha Somsanit (THA)	5–0	Bayarmaagiin Bilgüün (MGL); Ganboldyn Khongorzul (MGL)	4–0	4–0	4–1	4–1	6–4				
Kim Byung-gook (KOR); Ji Da-young (KOR)	5–0	Sippakorn Thong-ngiu (THA); Thanpitcha Somsanit (THA)	4–0	5–3	7–5	4–2	4–0				
Han Song-ryong (PRK); Ri Jin-mi (PRK)	5–0	Bayarmaagiin Bilgüün (MGL); Ganboldyn Khongorzul (MGL)	4–2	4–0	5–3	4–1	4–2				
Han Song-ryong (PRK); Ri Jin-mi (PRK)	5–2	Sippakorn Thong-ngiu (THA); Thanpitcha Somsanit (THA)	0–4	5–3	5–3	4–1	5–7	4–2	4–1		
Kim Byung-gook (KOR); Ji Da-young (KOR)	5–0	Bayarmaagiin Bilgüün (MGL); Ganboldyn Khongorzul (MGL)	4–0	4–1	4–1	4–0	4–1				

===== Group C =====
Pos	Team	Pld	W	L	GF	GA	GD	Qualification
1	Toshiki Uematsu (JPN) Noa Takahashi (JPN)	2	2	0	10	0	+10	Quarterfinals
2	Tio Juliandi Hutauruk (INA) Dwi Rahayu Pitri (INA)	2	1	1	5	5	0	Second stage
3	John Mada (CAM) Ho Sreynoch (CAM)	2	0	2	0	10	−10	

Source: ASTF

	Score		Game								
	Score		1	2	3	4	5	6	7	8	9
Toshiki Uematsu (JPN); Noa Takahashi (JPN)	5–0	John Mada (CAM); Ho Sreynoch (CAM)	4–1	4–2	4–1	4–2	4–1				
John Mada (CAM); Ho Sreynoch (CAM)	0–5	Tio Juliandi Hutauruk (INA); Dwi Rahayu Pitri (INA)	2–4	1–4	2–4	1–4	1–4				
Toshiki Uematsu (JPN); Noa Takahashi (JPN)	5–0	Tio Juliandi Hutauruk (INA); Dwi Rahayu Pitri (INA)	4–0	4–1	4–0	4–0	4–2				

===== Group D =====
Pos	Team	Pld	W	L	GF	GA	GD	Qualification
1	Riku Uchida (JPN) Tomomi Shimuta (JPN)	2	2	0	10	0	+10	Quarterfinals
2	Fernando Sanger (INA) Allif Nafiiah (INA)	2	1	1	5	5	0	Second stage
3	Nguyễn Nhật Quang (VIE) Đặng Thị Hạnh (VIE)	2	0	2	0	10	−10	

Source: ASTF

	Score		Game								
	Score		1	2	3	4	5	6	7	8	9
Riku Uchida (JPN); Tomomi Shimuta (JPN)	5–0	Nguyễn Nhật Quang (VIE); Đặng Thị Hạnh (VIE)	4–0	4–1	4–0	4–1	4–0				
Nguyễn Nhật Quang (VIE); Đặng Thị Hạnh (VIE)	0–5	Fernando Sanger (INA); Allif Nafiiah (INA)	1–4	0–4	2–4	0–4	3–5				
Riku Uchida (JPN); Tomomi Shimuta (JPN)	5–0	Fernando Sanger (INA); Allif Nafiiah (INA)	4–1	4–1	4–0	4–1	6–4				

===== Group E =====
Pos	Team	Pld	W	L	GF	GA	GD	Qualification
1	Bataagiin Mönkhtulga (MGL) Bataagiin Chinmörön (MGL)	2	2	0	10	6	+4	Second stage
2	Kawin Yannarit (THA) Praewa Jongjit (THA)	2	1	1	7	9	−2	Second stage
3	Kann Sophorn (CAM) Meth Mariyan (CAM)	2	0	2	8	10	−2	

Source: ASTF

	Score		Game								
	Score		1	2	3	4	5	6	7	8	9
Kawin Yannarit (THA); Praewa Jongjit (THA)	5–4	Kann Sophorn (CAM); Meth Mariyan (CAM)	4–1	0–4	4–2	2–4	3–5	4–1	3–5	5–3	10–8
Kann Sophorn (CAM); Meth Mariyan (CAM)	4–5	Bataagiin Mönkhtulga (MGL); Bataagiin Chinmörön (MGL)	6–4	4–1	4–1	4–2	1–4	2–4	5–7	3–5	5–7
Kawin Yannarit (THA); Praewa Jongjit (THA)	2–5	Bataagiin Mönkhtulga (MGL); Bataagiin Chinmörön (MGL)	1–4	3–5	4–2	5–3	5–7	5–7	2–4		

===== Group F =====
Pos	Team	Pld	W	L	GF	GA	GD	Qualification
1	Kim Hyun-soo (KOR) Mun Hye-gyeong (KOR)	3	3	0	15	1	+14	Quarterfinals
2	Lin Wei-chieh (TPE) Huang Shih-yuan (TPE)	3	2	1	10	8	+2	Second stage
3	Aniket Patel (IND) Raga Sri Kulandaivelu (IND)	3	1	2	5	13	−8	
4	Joseph Arcilla (PHI) Christy Sañosa (PHI)	3	0	3	7	15	−8	

Source: ASTF

	Score		Game								
	Score		1	2	3	4	5	6	7	8	9
Kim Hyun-soo (KOR); Mun Hye-gyeong (KOR)	5–0	Aniket Patel (IND); Raga Sri Kulandaivelu (IND)	4–2	4–1	4–2	4–1	4–2				
Joseph Arcilla (PHI); Christy Sañosa (PHI)	3–5	Lin Wei-chieh (TPE); Huang Shih-yuan (TPE)	4–0	0–4	0–4	1–4	0–4	6–4	4–2	2–4	
Kim Hyun-soo (KOR); Mun Hye-gyeong (KOR)	5–1	Joseph Arcilla (PHI); Christy Sañosa (PHI)	6–8	4–2	6–4	4–2	4–2	4–0			
Aniket Patel (IND); Raga Sri Kulandaivelu (IND)	0–5	Lin Wei-chieh (TPE); Huang Shih-yuan (TPE)	0–4	1–4	1–4	1–4	3–5				
Aniket Patel (IND); Raga Sri Kulandaivelu (IND)	5–3	Joseph Arcilla (PHI); Christy Sañosa (PHI)	1–4	4–0	2–4	2–4	4–1	4–1	4–2	4–2	
Kim Hyun-soo (KOR); Mun Hye-gyeong (KOR)	5–0	Lin Wei-chieh (TPE); Huang Shih-yuan (TPE)	4–1	4–2	4–0	4–2	4–0				

==== Knockout round ====
===== Final =====
Final
C1	Toshiki Uematsu (JPN); Noa Takahashi (JPN)	4	6	5	2	5	3	6	4
D1	Riku Uchida (JPN); Tomomi Shimuta (JPN)	6	4	3	4	3	5	4	1

===== Top half =====
Second stage								Quarterfinals									Semifinals
								A1	Yu Kai-wen (TPE); Cheng Chu-ling (TPE)	1	2	4	1	2
E2	Kawin Yannarit (THA); Praewa Jongjit (THA)	0	0	2	0	1		F2	Lin Wei-chieh (TPE); Huang Shih-yuan (TPE)	4	4	6	4	4
F2	Lin Wei-chieh (TPE); Huang Shih-yuan (TPE)	4	4	4	4	4											F2	Lin Wei-chieh (TPE); Huang Shih-yuan (TPE)	4	1	3	4	2	1	3
B1	Kim Byung-gook (KOR); Ji Da-young (KOR)	5	3	5	4	6	4										C1	Toshiki Uematsu (JPN); Noa Takahashi (JPN)	0	4	5	1	4	4	5
D2	Fernando Sanger (INA); Allif Nafiiah (INA)	3	5	3	0	4	2	B1	Kim Byung-gook (KOR); Ji Da-young (KOR)	2	5	1	1	4	4	1
								C1	Toshiki Uematsu (JPN); Noa Takahashi (JPN)	4	7	4	4	1	0	4

===== Bottom half =====
Second stage											Quarterfinals									Semifinals
											D1	Riku Uchida (JPN); Tomomi Shimuta (JPN)	2	4	4	4	4	4
E1	Bataagiin Mönkhtulga (MGL); Bataagiin Chinmörön (MGL)	4	1	1	4	0	2	0			C2	Tio Juliandi Hutauruk (INA); Dwi Rahayu Pitri (INA)	4	2	0	2	1	1
C2	Tio Juliandi Hutauruk (INA); Dwi Rahayu Pitri (INA)	2	4	4	2	4	4	4												D1	Riku Uchida (JPN); Tomomi Shimuta (JPN)	1	6	5	3	3	1	4	4	7
A2	Dheo Talatayod (PHI); Bien Zoleta-Mañalac (PHI)	4	6	4	3	11	2	4	6	5										F1	Kim Hyun-soo (KOR); Mun Hye-gyeong (KOR)	4	4	3	5	5	4	1	1	4
B2	Han Song-ryong (PRK); Ri Jin-mi (PRK)	6	4	1	5	9	4	2	8	7	B2	Han Song-ryong (PRK); Ri Jin-mi (PRK)	3	1	1	1	4	4	1
											F1	Kim Hyun-soo (KOR); Mun Hye-gyeong (KOR)	5	4	4	4	1	2	4
