= Prima Simpatiaji =

Indonesian tennis player

- Full name: Prima Simpatiaji
- Country (sports): Indonesia
- Born: 16 October 1981 (age 45)
- Plays: Right-handed
- Prize money: $10,840

Singles
- Highest ranking: No. 613 (19 June 2006)

Doubles
- Highest ranking: No. 635 (25 July 2005)

Prima Simpatiaji (born 16 October 1981) is a former professional tennis player from Indonesia.

== Biography ==
A right-handed player, Simpatiaji featured in twelve Davis Cup ties for Indonesia from 2003 to 2009. All of his 20 matches were in singles.

Simpatiaji represented Indonesia at tennis in various multi-sport competitions during his career. He won a total of six medals at the Southeast Asian Games, including team gold in 2003, as well as a silver at the 2005 Islamic Solidarity Games and a bronze at the 2007 Summer Universiade, both in the men's doubles.

Since retiring from the tennis circuit he has taken up the sport of soft tennis. At the 2011 Southeast Asian Games he won singles, doubles and team gold in his adopted sport. He also competed in soft tennis at the 2014 Asian Games and won a bronze medal in the mixed doubles.

== See also ==
- List of Indonesia Davis Cup team representatives
