= Cambodia at the 2022 Asian Games =

Cambodia in Multi Sports event

- IOC code: CAM
- NOC: National Olympic Committee of Cambodia

in Hangzhou, China 23 September 2023 – 8 October 2023
- Competitors: 131 (84 men and 47 women) in 18 sports
- Flag bearer: Chhorath Tep
- Medals: Gold 0 Silver 0 Bronze 1 Total 1

Asian Games appearances (overview)
- 1954; 1958; 1962; 1966; 1970; 1974; 1978–1990; 1994; 1998; 2002; 2006; 2010; 2014; 2018; 2022; 2026

Cambodia competed at the 2022 Asian Games in Hangzhou, Zhejiang, China, which began on 23 September 2023 and ended on 8 October 2023. The event was scheduled to be held in September 2022 but was postponed due to the rising COVID-19 cases in China. The event was later rescheduled to be held in September–October 2023.

== Competitors ==
Sport	Women	Man	Total
3x3 basketball	0	4	4
Athletics	1	9	10
Badminton	0	2	2
Cricket	0	13	13
Dragon boat	0	14	14
Fencing	2	0	2
Football	22	0	22
Judo	0	2	2
Ju-jitsu	0	1	1
Karate	6	4	10
Sailing	0	3	3
Soft tennis	5	5	10
Swimming	2	2	4
Taekwondo	3	2	5
Triathlon	1	0	1
Volleyball	0	12	12
Wrestling	5	9	14
Xiangqi	0	2	2
Total	47	84	131

== Athletics ==
The Cambodian contingent sent 10 names of athletes consisting of 9 male athletes and 1 female athletes each.

Key
- Note–Ranks given for track events are within the athlete's heat only
- Q = Qualified for the next round
- q = Qualified for the next round as a fastest loser or, in field events, by position without achieving the qualifying target
- SB = Season Best
- PB = Personal Best
- NR = National record
- N/A = Round not applicable for the event
- Bye = Athlete not required to compete in round

=== Men's ===
Track & road events

Athlete(s)	Event	Heat		Semifinal		Final	
Athlete(s)	Event	Result	Rank	Result	Rank	Result	Rank
Pen Sokong	100 m	10.93	8	Did not advance			
Noeb Chanyourong	100 m	10.89 PB	9	Did not advance			
Yatpitou Chantivea	200 m	22.61 SB	7	Did not advance			
Chhun Bunthorn	800 m	1:50.97	4	—		Did not advance	
Sorn Pisey	800 m	DNF		—		Did not advance	
Sorn Pisey	1500 m	4:25.38 PB	11	—		Did not advance	
Chhun Bunthorn	1500 m	3:59.97 NR	9	—		Did not advance	
Ouk Rohit	5000 m	—				15:38.56 SB	18
Van Pheara	10000 m	—				32:52.13 NR	13

Field events

Athlete	Event	Qualification		Final	
Athlete	Event	Result	Rank	Result	Rank
Yan Chan	High jump	1.90	15	Did not advance	
Sim Samedy	shot put	—		13.94	13
Sim Samedy	discus throw	—		39.12 PB	11

=== Women's ===
Track & road events

Athlete(s)	Event	Heat		Semifinal		Final	
Athlete(s)	Event	Result	Rank	Result	Rank	Result	Rank
Sang Lida	100 m	12.64	8	—		Did not advance	
