= 2012 FINA World Swimming Championships (25 m) – Men's 50 metre freestyle =

Men's 50m Freestyle at the 2012 Short Course Worlds
- Dates: 13 December (heats and semifinals); 14 December (final)
- Winning time: 20.55

Medalists
gold medal	Vladimir Morozov	Russia
silver medal	Florent Manaudou	France
bronze medal	Anthony Ervin	United States

The men's 50 metre freestyle event at the 11th FINA World Swimming Championships (25m) took place 13 – 14 December 2012 at the Sinan Erdem Dome.

== Records ==
Prior to this competition, the existing world and championship records were as follows.

	Name	Nation	Time	Location	Date
World record	Roland Schoeman	South Africa	20.30	Pietermaritzburg	8 August 2009
Championship record	César Cielo	Brazil	20.51	Dubai	17 December 2010

No new records were set during this competition.

== Results ==
=== Heats ===
Rank	Heat	Lane	Name	Time	Notes
1	16	4	Vladimir Morozov (RUS)	20.98	Q
2	17	4	Florent Manaudou (FRA)	21.06	Q
3	15	5	Marco Orsi (ITA)	21.36	Q
4	15	4	George Bovell (TRI)	21.39	Q
5	17	6	Kenta Ito (JPN)	21.49	Q
6	15	3	Nicholas Santos (BRA)	21.50	
6	17	5	Anthony Ervin (USA)	21.50	Q
8	17	3	Federico Bocchia (ITA)	21.51	Q
9	16	3	Ari-Pekka Liukkonen (FIN)	21.57	Q
10	17	1	Cameron Simpson (NZL)	21.62	Q, NR
11	16	5	Konrad Czerniak (POL)	21.64	Q
12	15	2	François Heersbrandt (BEL)	21.67	Q
13	15	6	Shinri Shioura (JPN)	21.68	Q
14	16	2	Andrii Govorov (UKR)	21.69	Q
15	16	1	Josh Schneider (USA)	21.70	Q
16	17	2	Kyle Richardson (AUS)	21.78	Q
17	16	7	Amaury Leveaux (FRA)	21.89	Q
18	14	0	Peter Mankoč (SLO)	21.95	
19	14	1	Yauhen Tsurkin (BLR)	21.96	NR
19	16	8	Lü Zhiwu (CHN)	21.96	
19	16	6	Krisztián Takács (HUN)	21.96	
22	12	8	Luke Peddie (CAN)	21.98	
23	2	9	Mindaugas Sadauskas (LTU)	22.01	
24	15	1	Hanser García (CUB)	22.04	NR
24	15	9	Norbert Trandafir (ROU)	22.04	
24	17	9	Pjotr Degtjarov (EST)	22.04	
27	15	8	Joshua McLeod (TRI)	22.12	
28	15	7	Kemal Arda Gurdal (TUR)	22.13	
29	14	5	Kristian Golomeev (GRE)	22.14	
30	16	9	Dominik Kozma (HUN)	22.18	
31	15	0	Shi Yang (CHN)	22.19	
32	13	4	Leith Shankland (RSA)	22.21	
32	17	8	Leonardo Alcover (BRA)	22.21	
34	17	7	Tomas Plevko (CZE)	22.23	
35	13	9	Guy Barnea (ISR)	22.30	
36	14	4	Iskender Baslakov (TUR)	22.31	
37	2	6	Arnel Dudic (BIH)	22.38	NR
38	16	0	Thomas Gossland (CAN)	22.43	
39	14	8	Viacheslav Prudnikov (RUS)	22.48	
40	12	5	Martin Verner (CZE)	22.49	
41	14	7	Ivan Levaj (CRO)	22.53	
42	13	6	Mihael Vukic (CRO)	22.57	
43	14	6	Oussama Sahnoune (ALG)	22.62	
44	13	5	Enzo Martinez Scarpe (URU)	22.63	
45	13	8	Daniel Ramirez Carranza (MEX)	22.70	
46	13	3	Matias Aguilera (ARG)	22.73	
47	14	2	Gabriel Melconian (URU)	22.75	
48	12	3	Hoang Quy Phuoc (VIE)	22.90	
49	14	3	Alon Mandel (ISR)	22.92	
50	13	2	Andrew Chetcuti (MLT)	22.95	NR
51	2	7	Mohammed Madouh (KUW)	22.96	NR
52	14	9	Joaquin Belza (ARG)	23.02	
53	13	7	Lao Kuan Fong (MAC)	23.05	
54	10	3	Sean Gunn (ZIM)	23.06	
55	13	1	Abdoul Khadre Mbaye Niane (SEN)	23.10	
56	12	1	Khurshidjon Tursunov (UZB)	23.14	
56	13	0	Orri Freyr Gudmundsson (ISL)	23.14	
58	10	6	Emmanuel Crescimbeni (PER)	23.16	
59	12	2	Vahan Mkhitaryan (ARM)	23.24	
60	11	4	José Montoya (CRC)	23.29	
61	11	2	JP Engelbrecht (NAM)	23.31	NR
62	12	0	Jusuf Nikola Ustavdich Velez (PER)	23.33	
63	12	4	Chun Nam Derrick Ng (HKG)	23.36	
64	10	8	David Sikharulidze (GEO)	23.37	
65	12	9	Ramadhan Abdallah Vyombo (KEN)	23.39	
66	9	4	Esau Simpson (GRN)	23.41	
67	10	0	Jordan Augier (LCA)	23.52	NR
67	11	7	Omiros Zagkas (CYP)	23.52	
69	12	7	Stanislav Karnaukhov (KGZ)	23.63	
70	10	7	Ahmad Attellesey (LBA)	23.71	
71	8	4	Andrew Rutherfurd (BOL)	23.74	
72	11	9	Jose Emmanuel Lobo Martinez (PAR)	23.75	
73	11	8	Jemal Le Grand (ARU)	23.79	
74	10	5	Samson Opuakpo (NGR)	23.82	
75	17	0	Christopher Duenas (GUM)	23.85	
76	9	7	Nicholas Coard (GRN)	23.88	
77	10	1	Omar Yousif (BHR)	23.90	
78	1	6	Adrian Todd (BOT)	23.92	
79	11	0	Radhames Kalaf (DOM)	24.02	
80	7	6	Eliebenezer San Jose Wong (NMI)	24.03	
81	2	8	Mahfizur Rahman Sagor (BAN)	24.10	
81	12	6	Sarma Nair (IND)	24.10	
83	9	3	Lionel Khoo (SIN)	24.12	
84	9	8	Malick Fall (SEN)	24.18	
85	8	2	Stanford Gore Kawale (PNG)	24.30	
86	9	9	Ngou Pok Man (MAC)	24.31	
87	7	0	Christian Selby (BAR)	24.32	
88	8	5	Bradford Worrell (LCA)	24.36	
88	11	3	Mbeh Tanji (CMR)	24.36	
90	8	3	James Sanderson (GIB)	24.37	NR
91	8	6	Dulguun Batsaikhan (MGL)	24.45	
92	6	6	Paul Elaisa (FIJ)	24.46	
93	9	5	Hilal Hemed Hilal (TAN)	24.52	
94	11	1	Obaid Al-Jasmi (UAE)	24.54	
95	5	5	Oriol Cuñat (AND)	24.56	
95	11	6	Neil Himanshu Contractor (IND)	24.56	
97	8	9	Adam Viktora (SEY)	24.57	
98	9	0	Christian Nazario Nikles (BRU)	24.74	
99	9	6	Nuno Rola (ANG)	24.80	
100	11	5	Ahmed Salam Al-Dulaimi (IRQ)	24.86	
101	7	2	Fernando Medrano Medina (NCA)	24.87	
102	9	1	Zaur Arkaniya (AZE)	24.92	
103	7	4	Tepaia Zac Payne (COK)	24.94	
104	7	1	Mohammad Abdo (PLE)	24.97	
105	8	1	David van der Colff (BOT)	25.02	
106	8	0	Tory Michael Pragassa (KEN)	25.12	
107	9	2	Johnny Rivera (GUM)	25.17	
108	1	5	Mamadou Amara Soumare (MLI)	25.27	
109	7	5	Tolga Akcayli (VIN)	25.36	
109	8	7	Omar Mithqal (JOR)	25.36	
111	8	8	Pierre Andre Adam (SEY)	25.64	
112	2	3	Borhane Ahmed Mohamed Abro (DJI)	25.80	
113	6	4	Abdulrahman Al-Kuwari (QAT)	25.84	
114	4	2	Chamraen Youri Maximov (CAM)	25.85	
115	6	5	Tano Pierre Claver Atta (CIV)	25.90	
116	5	8	Farhan Farhan (BHR)	25.92	
117	6	1	Suleyman Atayev (TKM)	25.96	
118	6	8	Kensuke Kimura (NMI)	26.07	
119	6	2	Milimo Mweetwa (ZAM)	26.11	
120	5	2	Giordan Harris (MHL)	26.13	
120	6	7	Valentin Gorshkov (TKM)	26.13	
122	4	4	Joshua Tibatemwa (UGA)	26.14	
123	1	3	Aung Thiha (MYA)	26.17	
124	5	7	Majd Tawil (PLE)	26.19	
125	5	0	Ponloeu Hemthon (CAM)	26.22	
126	7	3	C. Andrews (COK)	26.23	
127	4	8	Joseph Seguina (GUY)	26.27	
128	7	9	Oliver Quick (GIB)	26.34	
129	6	0	Umarkhon Alizoda (TJK)	26.49	
130	6	3	Ammaar Ghadiyali (TAN)	26.55	
131	2	0	Abdourahman Osman (DJI)	26.91	
132	5	9	S. Soukshathaphone (LAO)	26.92	
133	4	5	Ganzi Mugula (UGA)	27.08	
134	5	6	Mohamed Muthasim Adnan (MDV)	27.17	
135	5	4	Alassane Sylla (CIV)	27.28	
136	3	6	Brandon Schuster (SAM)	27.38	
137	4	1	Franc Aleksi (ALB)	27.39	
138	4	6	Hannibal Gaskin (GUY)	27.46	
139	3	3	Miraj Prajapati (NEP)	27.64	
140	4	7	Abdulla Al-Yehari (QAT)	27.66	
141	3	7	Shawn Dingilius-Wallace (PLW)	27.87	
142	5	1	Phathana Inthavong (LAO)	27.88	
143	3	8	Amadou Camara (GUI)	28.10	
144	3	5	Jamal Tamasese (SAM)	28.31	
145	5	3	Shamshod Dzhumaev (TJK)	28.47	
146	3	2	Billy-Scott Irakoze (BDI)	28.53	
147	3	1	Wilfried Tevoedjre (BEN)	28.86	
148	1	8	Eloi Imaniraguha (RWA)	29.08	
149	6	9	Ben Moussa Abdulkadry Djinguy (CMR)	29.97	
150	4	0	Carmel Bavuna (BDI)	30.06	
151	1	1	Mehiboob Chantilal (RWA)	30.16	
152	2	2	Taylor Ebwa (COD)	30.30	
153	3	9	Chavez Joseph (VIN)	31.07	
154	1	7	Doukure Yokamanzanga (COD)	32.82	
155	1	4	Ntseke Setho (LES)	32.98	
	1	2	Abdoul Bassith Wend Yam Traore (BUR)	DNS	
	2	1	Mohamed Mamane Sani Ousmane (NIG)	DNS	
	2	4	Crox Acuña (VEN)	DNS	
	2	5	Abdoul Ahmadou Youssoufou (NIG)	DNS	
	3	0	Ahmed Adam (SUD)	DNS	
	3	4	Ezeldeen Edris (SUD)	DNS	
	4	3	Kofi Komla Anku (GHA)	DNS	
	4	9	Ralph Benjamin Teiko Quaye (GHA)	DNS	
	7	7	Athoumani Youssouf (COM)	DNS	
	7	8	Aonzoudine Chaoili (COM)	DNS	
	10	2	João Aguiar (ANG)	DNS	
	10	4	Mohammed Al-Ghafri (UAE)	DNS	
	10	9	Barry Murphy (IRL)	DNS	

=== Semifinals ===
Rank	Heat	Lane	Name	Nationality	Time	Notes
1	1	4	Florent Manaudou	France	20.92	Q
2	2	4	Vladimir Morozov	Russia	20.95	Q
3	1	5	George Bovell	Trinidad and Tobago	21.09	Q
4	1	3	Anthony Ervin	United States	21.17	Q
5	2	1	Andrii Govorov	Ukraine	21.27	Q, NR
6	1	1	Josh Schneider	United States	21.28	Q
7	2	5	Marco Orsi	Italy	21.37	Q
8	2	6	Federico Bocchia	Italy	21.41	Q
9	2	3	Kenta Ito	Japan	21.44	
10	1	2	Konrad Czerniak	Poland	21.46	
11	2	8	Kyle Richardson	Australia	21.58	
12	1	8	Amaury Leveaux	France	21.62	
13	2	7	François Heersbrandt	Belgium	21.70	
14	1	6	Ari-Pekka Liukkonen	Finland	21.74	
15	1	7	Shinri Shioura	Japan	21.78	
16	2	2	Cameron Simpson	New Zealand	21.81	

=== Final ===
The final was held at 20:40.

Rank	Lane	Name	Nationality	Time	Notes
1st place, gold medalist(s)	5	Vladimir Morozov	Russia	20.55	NR
2nd place, silver medalist(s)	4	Florent Manaudou	France	20.88	
3rd place, bronze medalist(s)	6	Anthony Ervin	United States	20.99	
4	3	George Bovell	Trinidad and Tobago	21.03	
5	1	Marco Orsi	Italy	21.23	
6	7	Josh Schneider	United States	21.38	
7	2	Andrii Govorov	Ukraine	21.44	
8	8	Federico Bocchia	Italy	21.58	
