= Soft tennis at the 2014 Asian Games – Mixed doubles =

Double Soft tennis Event

Mixed doubles at the 2014 Asian Games
- Venue: Yeorumul Tennis Courts
- Dates: 1 October 2014
- Competitors: 38 from 11 nations

Medalists
gold medal	Kim Beom-jun; Kim Ae-kyung	South Korea
silver medal	Zhou Mo; Chen Hui	China
bronze medal	Park Kyu-cheol; Kim Ji-yeon	South Korea
bronze medal	Prima Simpatiaji; Maya Rosa	Indonesia

The mixed doubles soft tennis event was part of the soft tennis programme and took place on October 1, at the Yeorumul Tennis Courts.

== Schedule ==
All times are Korea Standard Time (UTC+09:00)

Date	Time	Event
Wednesday, 1 October 2014	09:00	Preliminary round
Wednesday, 1 October 2014	15:00	Quarterfinals
Wednesday, 1 October 2014	16:00	Semifinals
Wednesday, 1 October 2014	17:20	Final

== Results ==
Legend

- WO — Won by walkover

=== Preliminary round ===
==== Group A ====
Pos	Team	Pld	W	L	GF	GA	GD	Qualification
1	Hidenori Shinohara (JPN) Kana Morihara (JPN)	4	4	0	20	7	+13	Quarterfinals
2	Kim Beom-jun (KOR) Kim Ae-kyung (KOR)	4	3	1	18	7	+11	Quarterfinals
3	Ho Meng-hsun (TPE) Kuo Chien-chi (TPE)	4	2	2	15	14	+1	
4	Shi Xiaolin (CHN) Zhong Yi (CHN)	4	1	3	8	17	−9	
5	Gantulgyn Enkhtüvshin (MGL) Möngöntsetsegiin Anudari (MGL)	4	0	4	4	20	−16	

Source: OCA

	Score		Game								
	Score		1	2	3	4	5	6	7	8	9
Hidenori Shinohara (JPN); Kana Morihara (JPN)	5–0	Gantulgyn Enkhtüvshin (MGL); Möngöntsetsegiin Anudari (MGL)	4–1	4–0	4–0	5–3	4–2				
Ho Meng-hsun (TPE); Kuo Chien-chi (TPE)	5–2	Shi Xiaolin (CHN); Zhong Yi (CHN)	4–6	4–1	4–1	3–5	4–1	4–0	9–7		
Kim Beom-jun (KOR); Kim Ae-kyung (KOR)	5–0	Gantulgyn Enkhtüvshin (MGL); Möngöntsetsegiin Anudari (MGL)	4–1	4–0	4–2	4–0	4–0				
Hidenori Shinohara (JPN); Kana Morihara (JPN)	5–3	Ho Meng-hsun (TPE); Kuo Chien-chi (TPE)	4–1	4–0	2–4	4–1	4–6	6–8	4–1	4–0	
Kim Beom-jun (KOR); Kim Ae-kyung (KOR)	5–0	Shi Xiaolin (CHN); Zhong Yi (CHN)	4–1	4–1	6–4	4–2	4–1				
Ho Meng-hsun (TPE); Kuo Chien-chi (TPE)	5–2	Gantulgyn Enkhtüvshin (MGL); Möngöntsetsegiin Anudari (MGL)	4–0	1–4	4–1	1–4	4–0	4–1	5–3		
Kim Beom-jun (KOR); Kim Ae-kyung (KOR)	5–2	Ho Meng-hsun (TPE); Kuo Chien-chi (TPE)	5–3	8–6	1–4	4–2	4–1	2–4	4–2		
Hidenori Shinohara (JPN); Kana Morihara (JPN)	5–1	Shi Xiaolin (CHN); Zhong Yi (CHN)	4–1	4–2	4–2	4–2	1–4	4–1			
Kim Beom-jun (KOR); Kim Ae-kyung (KOR)	3–5	Hidenori Shinohara (JPN); Kana Morihara (JPN)	4–1	1–4	4–2	4–2	2–4	5–7	1–4	3–5	
Shi Xiaolin (CHN); Zhong Yi (CHN)	5–2	Gantulgyn Enkhtüvshin (MGL); Möngöntsetsegiin Anudari (MGL)	4–2	3–5	6–4	4–1	4–1	2–4	4–2		

==== Group B ====
Pos	Team	Pld	W	L	GF	GA	GD	Qualification
1	Keiya Nakamoto (JPN) Nao Kobayashi (JPN)	3	3	0	15	6	+9	Quarterfinals
2	Park Kyu-cheol (KOR) Kim Ji-yeon (KOR)	3	2	1	13	6	+7	Quarterfinals
3	Li Chia-hung (TPE) Cheng Chu-ling (TPE)	3	1	2	7	12	−5	
4	Ferdy Fauzi Narun (INA) Dwi Rahayu Pitri (INA)	3	0	3	4	15	−11	

Source: OCA

	Score		Game								
	Score		1	2	3	4	5	6	7	8	9
Park Kyu-cheol (KOR); Kim Ji-yeon (KOR)	5–0	Ferdy Fauzi Narun (INA); Dwi Rahayu Pitri (INA)	4–2	4–0	5–3	4–0	4–1				
Keiya Nakamoto (JPN); Nao Kobayashi (JPN)	5–1	Li Chia-hung (TPE); Cheng Chu-ling (TPE)	4–2	4–2	6–4	8–10	4–1	4–0			
Park Kyu-cheol (KOR); Kim Ji-yeon (KOR)	5–1	Li Chia-hung (TPE); Cheng Chu-ling (TPE)	6–4	2–4	4–0	4–0	4–2	4–2			
Keiya Nakamoto (JPN); Nao Kobayashi (JPN)	5–2	Ferdy Fauzi Narun (INA); Dwi Rahayu Pitri (INA)	4–0	4–0	1–4	4–0	2–4	4–1	4–2		
Park Kyu-cheol (KOR); Kim Ji-yeon (KOR)	3–5	Keiya Nakamoto (JPN); Nao Kobayashi (JPN)	1–4	5–3	5–3	2–4	1–4	1–4	6–4	1–4	
Li Chia-hung (TPE); Cheng Chu-ling (TPE)	5–2	Ferdy Fauzi Narun (INA); Dwi Rahayu Pitri (INA)	2–4	6–4	4–0	4–1	2–4	4–0	5–3		

==== Group C ====
Pos	Team	Pld	W	L	GF	GA	GD	Qualification
1	Zhou Mo (CHN) Chen Hui (CHN)	4	4	0	20	1	+19	Quarterfinals
2	Prima Simpatiaji (INA) Maya Rosa (INA)	4	3	1	15	8	+7	Quarterfinals
3	Manoj Subba (NEP) Neeru Kayastha (NEP)	4	2	2	12	12	0	
4	Huỳnh Chí Khương (VIE) Trần Thanh Hoàng Ngân (VIE)	4	1	3	7	16	−9	
5	Khampaseuth Bounsaath (LAO) Kinnaly Sengchanh (LAO)	4	0	4	3	20	−17	

Source: OCA

	Score		Game								
	Score		1	2	3	4	5	6	7	8	9
Prima Simpatiaji (INA); Maya Rosa (INA)	5–1	Khampaseuth Bounsaath (LAO); Kinnaly Sengchanh (LAO)	5–3	4–1	0–4	4–0	4–0	7–5			
Huỳnh Chí Khương (VIE); Trần Thanh Hoàng Ngân (VIE)	1–5	Manoj Subba (NEP); Neeru Kayastha (NEP)	2–4	4–1	4–6	2–4	5–7	3–5			
Zhou Mo (CHN); Chen Hui (CHN)	5–0	Khampaseuth Bounsaath (LAO); Kinnaly Sengchanh (LAO)	4–1	4–1	4–0	4–1	4–0				
Prima Simpatiaji (INA); Maya Rosa (INA)	5–0	Huỳnh Chí Khương (VIE); Trần Thanh Hoàng Ngân (VIE)	4–0	4–0	4–0	8–6	4–0				
Zhou Mo (CHN); Chen Hui (CHN)	5–0	Manoj Subba (NEP); Neeru Kayastha (NEP)	4–0	5–3	4–0	6–4	4–0				
Huỳnh Chí Khương (VIE); Trần Thanh Hoàng Ngân (VIE)	5–1	Khampaseuth Bounsaath (LAO); Kinnaly Sengchanh (LAO)	5–3	4–1	4–1	4–2	7–9	4–2			
Zhou Mo (CHN); Chen Hui (CHN)	5–1	Huỳnh Chí Khương (VIE); Trần Thanh Hoàng Ngân (VIE)	4–1	4–1	4–2	4–0	1–4	4–1			
Prima Simpatiaji (INA); Maya Rosa (INA)	5–2	Manoj Subba (NEP); Neeru Kayastha (NEP)	4–6	4–1	4–1	4–1	4–1	2–4	4–0		
Zhou Mo (CHN); Chen Hui (CHN)	5–0	Prima Simpatiaji (INA); Maya Rosa (INA)	4–2	8–6	4–1	4–0	5–3				
Manoj Subba (NEP); Neeru Kayastha (NEP)	5–1	Khampaseuth Bounsaath (LAO); Kinnaly Sengchanh (LAO)	5–3	2–4	4–1	4–2	4–2	4–2			

==== Group D ====
Pos	Team	Pld	W	L	GF	GA	GD	Qualification
1	Ochirsaikhany Bayasgalant (MGL) Bulgany Norovsüren (MGL)	4	4	0	15	3	+12	Quarterfinals
2	Jhomar Arcilla (PHI) Bien Zoleta (PHI)	4	3	1	12	5	+7	Quarterfinals
3	Kamal Bahadur Bhandari (NEP) Eliza Ranjit (NEP)	4	2	2	5	14	−9	
4	Chittakone Sayaline (LAO) Phonesamai Champamanivong (LAO)	4	1	3	5	15	−10	
—	Orn Sambath (CAM) Yi Sophany (CAM)	4	0	4	0	0	0	

Source: OCA

	Score		Game								
	Score		1	2	3	4	5	6	7	8	9
Ochirsaikhany Bayasgalant (MGL); Bulgany Norovsüren (MGL)	WO	Orn Sambath (CAM); Yi Sophany (CAM)									
Kamal Bahadur Bhandari (NEP); Eliza Ranjit (NEP)	5–4	Chittakone Sayaline (LAO); Phonesamai Champamanivong (LAO)	7–5	0–4	0–4	4–2	0–4	4–1	2–4	4–2	7–3
Jhomar Arcilla (PHI); Bien Zoleta (PHI)	WO	Orn Sambath (CAM); Yi Sophany (CAM)									
Ochirsaikhany Bayasgalant (MGL); Bulgany Norovsüren (MGL)	5–0	Kamal Bahadur Bhandari (NEP); Eliza Ranjit (NEP)	4–1	4–2	4–2	4–0	4–2				
Jhomar Arcilla (PHI); Bien Zoleta (PHI)	5–0	Chittakone Sayaline (LAO); Phonesamai Champamanivong (LAO)	4–0	4–2	4–2	7–5	7–5				
Kamal Bahadur Bhandari (NEP); Eliza Ranjit (NEP)	WO	Orn Sambath (CAM); Yi Sophany (CAM)									
Jhomar Arcilla (PHI); Bien Zoleta (PHI)	5–0	Kamal Bahadur Bhandari (NEP); Eliza Ranjit (NEP)	4–1	4–1	4–1	4–1	4–1				
Ochirsaikhany Bayasgalant (MGL); Bulgany Norovsüren (MGL)	5–1	Chittakone Sayaline (LAO); Phonesamai Champamanivong (LAO)	4–2	4–1	4–2	4–1	2–4	5–3			
Jhomar Arcilla (PHI); Bien Zoleta (PHI)	2–5	Ochirsaikhany Bayasgalant (MGL); Bulgany Norovsüren (MGL)	7–5	2–4	0–4	5–3	2–4	3–5	0–4		
Chittakone Sayaline (LAO); Phonesamai Champamanivong (LAO)	WO	Orn Sambath (CAM); Yi Sophany (CAM)									

- Yi Sophany of Cambodia was disqualified from the competition after she tested positive for Sibutramine before the start.

=== Knockout round ===
Quarterfinals
A1	Hidenori Shinohara (JPN); Kana Morihara (JPN)	4	1	2	4	5	4	3	1
B2	Park Kyu-cheol (KOR); Kim Ji-yeon (KOR)	2	4	4	2	7	2	5	4
A2	Kim Beom-jun (KOR); Kim Ae-kyung (KOR)	4	2	6	4	4	2	5
B1	Keiya Nakamoto (JPN); Nao Kobayashi (JPN)	1	4	4	2	2	4	3
C1	Zhou Mo (CHN); Chen Hui (CHN)	4	6	4	2	2	6	4
D1	Jhomar Arcilla (PHI); Bien Zoleta (PHI)	0	4	1	4	4	4	2
C2	Prima Simpatiaji (INA); Maya Rosa (INA)	4	5	4	2	3	4	2	4	11
D1	Ochirsaikhany Bayasgalant (MGL); Bulgany Norovsüren (MGL)	1	7	2	4	5	2	4	0	9

Semifinals
B2	Park Kyu-cheol (KOR); Kim Ji-yeon (KOR)	2	0	3	4	4	4	3	2
A2	Kim Beom-jun (KOR); Kim Ae-kyung (KOR)	4	4	5	0	1	2	5	4
C1	Zhou Mo (CHN); Chen Hui (CHN)	2	0	4	0	4	5	4	6
C2	Prima Simpatiaji (INA); Maya Rosa (INA)	4	4	0	4	1	3	0	4

Final
A2	Kim Beom-jun (KOR); Kim Ae-kyung (KOR)	4	8	1	4	4	4
C1	Zhou Mo (CHN); Chen Hui (CHN)	2	6	4	2	2	0
