= Phathana Inthavong =

Laotian swimmer

Personal information
- Full name: Phathana Inthavong
- Nickname: Jimmy
- Nationality: Laotian
- Born: February 15, 1997 (age 29) Vientiane, Laos
- Height: 1.75 m (5 ft 9 in)

Sport
- Sport: Swimming
- Strokes: Backstroke, Freestyle

Phathana Inthavong (born February 15, 1997, in Vientiane, Laos) is a Laotian swimmer specializing in Freestyle and Backstroke. He swam for Laos at the 2012 Summer Olympics. In August 2013 he joined the FINA World Aquatics Championships in Barcelona, Spain.

At the 2012 Summer Olympics, he ranked number 56th of the event.

== Early life ==
Phathana was born and raised in Vientiane, located in the centre of Laos. He studied in Kiettisack International School, 2014 and currently in Dong-a University. Phathana is the second of three children. Phathana began swimming at the age of nine, partly because of the influence of his sisters and partly to provide him with an outlet for his energy. By the age of 12, he swam in the 2009 Southeast Asian Games held in Vientiane, Laos.

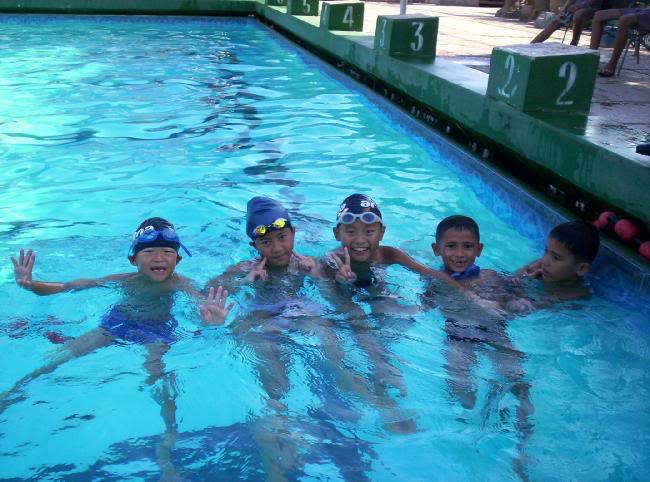
Phathana and his colleagues in 2007

At the end of 2010 Phathana and his teammates participated in Lao-Korean Friendship Training Course held by KOICA. The program was in Incheon, South Korea from 30 July until 31 August.

== Swimming career ==
=== World Aquatics Championships ===
Phathana competed at the 2011 World Aquatics Championships in Shanghai, China between July 16 and 31, 2011. July 29, 2011, he swam 50 Freestyle heat 3 on lane number 8 with the time of 28.94. July 30, 2011, he swam 50 Backstroke heat 1 lane number 4 with the time of 35.30.

Rank	Heat	Lane	Events	Time	Venue	Location	Year
101	3	8	Freestyle 50	28.94	Shanghai Oriental Sports Center	Shanghai, CHN	2011
37	1	4	Backstroke 50	35.30	Shanghai Oriental Sports Center	Shanghai, CHN	2011
142	5	1	Freestyle 50	27.88	Sinan Erdem Dome	Istanbul, TUR	2012
85	2	8	Freestyle 100	1.02.85	Palau Sant Jordi	Barcelona, ESP	2013
148	2	7	Freestyle 100	1.01.66	Hamad Aquatic Centre	Doha, Qatar	2014
86	1	8	Backstroke 100	1.10.52	Hamad Aquatic Centre	Doha, Qatar	2014

=== 2011 Southeast Asian Games ===
Rank	Events	Time	Venue	Location	Year
12	Backstroke 50	34.32	Jakabaring Sport Complex	Palembang, INA	2011
12	Breaststroke 50	35.50	Jakabaring Sport Complex	Palembang, INA	2011
13	Backstroke 100	1.13.77	Jakabaring Sport Complex	Palembang, INA	2011
6	4 × 100 m Freestyle Relay	4.11.36	Jakabaring Sport Complex	Palembang, INA	2011

=== 2012 Summer Olympics ===
Rank	Heat	Lane	Events	Time	Location	Location	Year
56	1	4	Freestyle 50	28.17	London Aquatics Centre	London, GBR	2012

=== 2014 Asian Games ===
Rank	Heat	Lane	Events	Time	Venue	Location	Year
36	1	1	Freestyle 100	1.02.46	Munhak Park Tae-hwan Aquatics Center	Incheon, South Korea	2014
39	1	4	Freestyle 50	28.09	Munhak Park Tae-hwan Aquatics Center	Incheon, South Korea	2014

2012 FINA World Swimming Championships (25 m) – Men's 50 metre freestyle

== See also ==
- Swimming at the 2015 World Aquatics Championships
- Laos at the 2015 World Aquatics Championships
- Laos at the 2013 World Aquatics Championships
- Laos at the 2011 World Aquatics Championships
- 2012 FINA World Swimming Championships (25 m)
- 2014 FINA World Swimming Championships (25 m)
