= Soft tennis at the 2014 Asian Games – Women's singles =

Women's singles at the 2014 Asian Games
- Venue: Yeorumul Tennis Courts
- Dates: 29–30 September 2014
- Competitors: 19 from 11 nations

Medalists
gold medal	Kim Bo-mi	South Korea
silver medal	Chen Hui	China
bronze medal	Kim Ae-kyung	South Korea
bronze medal	Zhong Yi	China

The women's singles soft tennis event was part of the soft tennis programme and took place between September 29 and 30, at the Yeorumul Tennis Courts.

== Schedule ==
All times are Korea Standard Time (UTC+09:00)

Date	Time	Event
Monday, 29 September 2014	16:30	Preliminary round
Tuesday, 30 September 2014	09:00	Preliminary round
Tuesday, 30 September 2014	12:00	Quarterfinals
Tuesday, 30 September 2014	14:30	Semifinals
Tuesday, 30 September 2014	16:50	Final

== Results ==
Legend

- WO — Won by walkover

=== Preliminary round ===
==== Group A ====
Pos	Athlete	Pld	W	L	GF	GA	GD	Qualification
1	Kim Ae-kyung (KOR)	4	4	0	12	1	+11	Quarterfinals
2	Chiang Wan-chi (TPE)	4	3	1	9	5	+4	Quarterfinals
3	Hikaru Yamashita (JPN)	4	2	2	5	8	−3	
4	Kinnaly Sengchanh (LAO)	4	1	3	0	12	−12	
—	Yi Sophany (CAM)	4	0	4	0	0	0	

Source: OCA

	Score		Game						
	Score		1	2	3	4	5	6	7
Chiang Wan-chi (TPE)	WO	Yi Sophany (CAM)							
Hikaru Yamashita (JPN)	4–0	Kinnaly Sengchanh (LAO)	4–0	4–0	4–1	4–1			
Kim Ae-kyung (KOR)	WO	Yi Sophany (CAM)							
Chiang Wan-chi (TPE)	4–1	Hikaru Yamashita (JPN)	4–1	4–1	1–4	4–1	4–0		
Kim Ae-kyung (KOR)	4–0	Kinnaly Sengchanh (LAO)	4–2	4–1	4–0	4–0			
Hikaru Yamashita (JPN)	WO	Yi Sophany (CAM)							
Chiang Wan-chi (TPE)	4–0	Kinnaly Sengchanh (LAO)	4–0	4–2	4–0	4–0			
Kim Ae-kyung (KOR)	4–0	Hikaru Yamashita (JPN)	6–4	4–2	6–4	5–3			
Kinnaly Sengchanh (LAO)	WO	Yi Sophany (CAM)							
Kim Ae-kyung (KOR)	4–1	Chiang Wan-chi (TPE)	4–1	4–0	3–5	4–1	4–1		

- Yi Sophany of Cambodia was disqualified from the competition after she tested positive for Sibutramine before the start.

==== Group B ====
Pos	Athlete	Pld	W	L	GF	GA	GD	Qualification
1	Kim Bo-mi (KOR)	3	3	0	12	5	+7	Quarterfinals
2	Ayaka Oba (JPN)	3	2	1	11	8	+3	Quarterfinals
3	Cheng Chu-ling (TPE)	3	1	2	8	8	0	
4	Dwi Rahayu Pitri (INA)	3	0	3	2	12	−10	

Source: OCA

	Score		Game						
	Score		1	2	3	4	5	6	7
Kim Bo-mi (KOR)	4–1	Dwi Rahayu Pitri (INA)	4–1	4–2	0–4	4–0	4–2		
Cheng Chu-ling (TPE)	3–4	Ayaka Oba (JPN)	4–6	3–5	4–1	4–2	4–1	2–4	2–7
Kim Bo-mi (KOR)	4–3	Ayaka Oba (JPN)	1–4	1–4	5–3	2–4	4–1	4–0	8–6
Cheng Chu-ling (TPE)	4–0	Dwi Rahayu Pitri (INA)	4–0	4–2	4–1	4–0			
Kim Bo-mi (KOR)	4–1	Cheng Chu-ling (TPE)	1–4	5–3	4–2	4–0	4–1		
Ayaka Oba (JPN)	4–1	Dwi Rahayu Pitri (INA)	2–4	4–2	4–2	4–0	5–3		

==== Group C ====
Pos	Athlete	Pld	W	L	GF	GA	GD	Qualification
1	Chen Hui (CHN)	4	4	0	16	0	+16	Quarterfinals
2	Bien Zoleta (PHI)	4	3	1	12	6	+6	Quarterfinals
3	Möngöntsetsegiin Anudari (MGL)	4	2	2	10	9	+1	
4	Eliza Ranjit (NEP)	4	1	3	5	15	−10	
5	Phonesamai Champamanivong (LAO)	4	0	4	3	16	−13	

Source: OCA

	Score		Game						
	Score		1	2	3	4	5	6	7
Phonesamai Champamanivong (LAO)	0–4	Bien Zoleta (PHI)	2–4	2–4	1–4	0–4			
Möngöntsetsegiin Anudari (MGL)	4–1	Eliza Ranjit (NEP)	4–0	1–4	4–1	4–1	4–1		
Chen Hui (CHN)	4–0	Bien Zoleta (PHI)	4–2	4–1	4–1	4–1			
Phonesamai Champamanivong (LAO)	0–4	Möngöntsetsegiin Anudari (MGL)	0–4	0–4	0–4	1–4			
Chen Hui (CHN)	4–0	Eliza Ranjit (NEP)	4–0	4–1	4–2	4–0			
Möngöntsetsegiin Anudari (MGL)	2–4	Bien Zoleta (PHI)	1–4	4–2	0–4	4–1	4–6	3–5	
Phonesamai Champamanivong (LAO)	3–4	Eliza Ranjit (NEP)	4–2	4–1	2–4	4–2	3–5	3–5	6–8
Chen Hui (CHN)	4–0	Möngöntsetsegiin Anudari (MGL)	4–1	4–1	4–1	4–0			
Eliza Ranjit (NEP)	0–4	Bien Zoleta (PHI)	0–4	0–4	1–4	4–6			
Chen Hui (CHN)	4–0	Phonesamai Champamanivong (LAO)	4–0	4–0	4–1	4–2			

==== Group D ====
Pos	Athlete	Pld	W	L	GF	GA	GD	Qualification
1	Zhong Yi (CHN)	4	4	0	16	1	+15	Quarterfinals
2	Maya Rosa (INA)	4	3	1	12	4	+8	Quarterfinals
3	Trần Thanh Hoàng Ngân (VIE)	4	2	2	8	12	−4	
4	Amarsanaagiin Mönkh-Uchral (MGL)	4	1	3	6	12	−6	
5	Neeru Kayastha (NEP)	4	0	4	3	16	−13	

Source: OCA

	Score		Game						
	Score		1	2	3	4	5	6	7
Maya Rosa (INA)	4–0	Trần Thanh Hoàng Ngân (VIE)	5–3	4–2	4–1	4–2			
Amarsanaagiin Mönkh-Uchral (MGL)	4–0	Neeru Kayastha (NEP)	5–3	4–1	7–5	4–2			
Zhong Yi (CHN)	4–0	Trần Thanh Hoàng Ngân (VIE)	4–0	4–2	4–1	4–1			
Maya Rosa (INA)	4–0	Amarsanaagiin Mönkh-Uchral (MGL)	6–4	4–0	4–0	4–1			
Zhong Yi (CHN)	4–1	Neeru Kayastha (NEP)	1–4	4–0	4–0	4–1	4–1		
Amarsanaagiin Mönkh-Uchral (MGL)	2–4	Trần Thanh Hoàng Ngân (VIE)	2–4	4–2	4–2	5–7	0–4	2–4	
Maya Rosa (INA)	4–0	Neeru Kayastha (NEP)	8–6	4–1	4–1	4–2			
Zhong Yi (CHN)	4–0	Amarsanaagiin Mönkh-Uchral (MGL)	4–0	4–1	4–1	4–0			
Neeru Kayastha (NEP)	2–4	Trần Thanh Hoàng Ngân (VIE)	0–4	5–3	4–2	1–4	2–4	1–4	
Zhong Yi (CHN)	4–0	Maya Rosa (INA)	6–4	4–1	4–0	9–7			

=== Knockout round ===
Quarterfinals
A1	Kim Ae-kyung (KOR)	5	9	5	5	2	3	7
B2	Ayaka Oba (JPN)	3	11	3	3	4	5	3
A2	Chiang Wan-chi (TPE)	0	5	4	2	4	4	2
B1	Kim Bo-mi (KOR)	4	3	2	4	6	2	7
C1	Chen Hui (CHN)	4	4	4	4
D2	Maya Rosa (INA)	2	0	0	1
C2	Bien Zoleta (PHI)	1	4	4	3	2	1
D1	Zhong Yi (CHN)	4	2	1	5	4	4

Semifinals
A1	Kim Ae-kyung (KOR)	2	4	2	4	5	1
B1	Kim Bo-mi (KOR)	4	1	4	6	3	4
C1	Chen Hui (CHN)	4	4	4	4
D1	Zhong Yi (CHN)	2	2	1	2

Final
B1	Kim Bo-mi (KOR)	1	5	4	4	4
C1	Chen Hui (CHN)	4	3	1	2	1
