= Soft tennis at the 2014 Asian Games – Women's doubles =

Women's doubles at the 2014 Asian Games
- Venue: Yeorumul Tennis Courts
- Dates: 2 October 2014
- Competitors: 28 from 8 nations

Medalists
gold medal	Joo Og; Kim Ae-kyung	South Korea
silver medal	Yoon Soo-jung; Kim Ji-yeon	South Korea
bronze medal	Nao Morita; Hikaru Yamashita	Japan
bronze medal	Cheng Chu-ling; Chen Yi-chia	Chinese Taipei

The women's doubles soft tennis event was part of the soft tennis programme and took place on October 2, at the Yeorumul Tennis Courts.

== Schedule ==
All times are Korea Standard Time (UTC+09:00)

Date	Time	Event
Thursday, 2 October 2014	09:00	Preliminary round
Thursday, 2 October 2014	13:30	Quarterfinals
Thursday, 2 October 2014	16:10	Semifinals
Thursday, 2 October 2014	18:00	Final

== Results ==
=== Preliminary round ===
==== Group A ====
Pos	Team	Pld	W	L	GF	GA	GD	Qualification
1	Nao Morita (JPN) Hikaru Yamashita (JPN)	2	2	0	10	0	+10	Quarterfinals
2	Enkhbaataryn Solongo (MGL) Bulgany Norovsüren (MGL)	2	1	1	5	7	−2	Quarterfinals
3	Nira Kayastha (NEP) Neeru Kayastha (NEP)	2	0	2	2	10	−8	

Source: OCA

	Score		Game								
	Score		1	2	3	4	5	6	7	8	9
Enkhbaataryn Solongo (MGL); Bulgany Norovsüren (MGL)	5–2	Nira Kayastha (NEP); Neeru Kayastha (NEP)	1–4	4–1	4–6	7–5	5–3	4–1	4–2		
Nao Morita (JPN); Hikaru Yamashita (JPN)	5–0	Nira Kayastha (NEP); Neeru Kayastha (NEP)	6–4	4–0	4–0	4–1	4–2				
Nao Morita (JPN); Hikaru Yamashita (JPN)	5–0	Enkhbaataryn Solongo (MGL); Bulgany Norovsüren (MGL)	5–3	6–4	4–0	4–1	4–0				

==== Group B ====
Pos	Team	Pld	W	L	GF	GA	GD	Qualification
1	Yoon Soo-jung (KOR) Kim Ji-yeon (KOR)	2	2	0	10	1	+9	Quarterfinals
2	Chan Chia-hsin (TPE) Kuo Chien-chi (TPE)	2	1	1	5	7	−2	Quarterfinals
3	Feng Zixuan (CHN) Zhong Yi (CHN)	2	0	2	3	10	−7	

Source: OCA

	Score		Game								
	Score		1	2	3	4	5	6	7	8	9
Yoon Soo-jung (KOR); Kim Ji-yeon (KOR)	5–0	Chan Chia-hsin (TPE); Kuo Chien-chi (TPE)	4–2	4–1	5–3	5–3	4–2				
Feng Zixuan (CHN); Zhong Yi (CHN)	2–5	Chan Chia-hsin (TPE); Kuo Chien-chi (TPE)	1–4	4–1	4–6	4–2	3–5	2–4	3–5		
Feng Zixuan (CHN); Zhong Yi (CHN)	1–5	Yoon Soo-jung (KOR); Kim Ji-yeon (KOR)	2–4	3–5	4–0	0–4	2–4	9–11			

==== Group C ====
Pos	Team	Pld	W	L	GF	GA	GD	Qualification
1	Cheng Chu-ling (TPE) Chen Yi-chia (TPE)	3	3	0	15	2	+13	Quarterfinals
2	Kana Morihara (JPN) Nao Kobayashi (JPN)	3	2	1	12	8	+4	Quarterfinals
3	Dwi Rahayu Pitri (INA) Maya Rosa (INA)	3	1	2	6	12	−6	
4	Sugaryn Ganchimeg (MGL) Amarsanaagiin Mönkh-Uchral (MGL)	3	0	3	4	15	−11	

Source: OCA

	Score		Game								
	Score		1	2	3	4	5	6	7	8	9
Cheng Chu-ling (TPE); Chen Yi-chia (TPE)	5–0	Dwi Rahayu Pitri (INA); Maya Rosa (INA)	5–3	4–1	4–1	4–2	6–4				
Kana Morihara (JPN); Nao Kobayashi (JPN)	5–2	Sugaryn Ganchimeg (MGL); Amarsanaagiin Mönkh-Uchral (MGL)	4–1	2–4	4–0	3–5	4–2	4–1	5–3		
Cheng Chu-ling (TPE); Chen Yi-chia (TPE)	5–0	Sugaryn Ganchimeg (MGL); Amarsanaagiin Mönkh-Uchral (MGL)	4–0	4–2	4–2	4–1	4–0				
Kana Morihara (JPN); Nao Kobayashi (JPN)	5–1	Dwi Rahayu Pitri (INA); Maya Rosa (INA)	4–0	4–0	4–2	4–1	4–6	4–0			
Cheng Chu-ling (TPE); Chen Yi-chia (TPE)	5–2	Kana Morihara (JPN); Nao Kobayashi (JPN)	1–4	5–3	5–3	4–1	4–0	0–4	4–1		
Sugaryn Ganchimeg (MGL); Amarsanaagiin Mönkh-Uchral (MGL)	2–5	Dwi Rahayu Pitri (INA); Maya Rosa (INA)	0–4	5–3	1–4	5–3	2–4	1–4	0–4		

==== Group D ====
Pos	Team	Pld	W	L	GF	GA	GD	Qualification
1	Joo Og (KOR) Kim Ae-kyung (KOR)	3	3	0	15	1	+14	Quarterfinals
2	Chen Hui (CHN) Xin Yani (CHN)	3	2	1	11	5	+6	Quarterfinals
3	Chandra Maya Rai (NEP) Eliza Ranjit (NEP)	3	1	2	5	13	−8	
4	Phonesamai Champamanivong (LAO) Kinnaly Sengchanh (LAO)	3	0	3	3	15	−12	

Source: OCA

	Score		Game								
	Score		1	2	3	4	5	6	7	8	9
Joo Og (KOR); Kim Ae-kyung (KOR)	5–0	Chandra Maya Rai (NEP); Eliza Ranjit (NEP)	4–0	4–0	4–0	4–0	4–0				
Chen Hui (CHN); Xin Yani (CHN)	5–0	Phonesamai Champamanivong (LAO); Kinnaly Sengchanh (LAO)	4–1	4–2	4–1	4–2	4–2				
Joo Og (KOR); Kim Ae-kyung (KOR)	5–0	Phonesamai Champamanivong (LAO); Kinnaly Sengchanh (LAO)	4–2	4–0	4–0	4–2	4–0				
Chen Hui (CHN); Xin Yani (CHN)	5–0	Chandra Maya Rai (NEP); Eliza Ranjit (NEP)	4–0	4–2	4–1	4–1	4–0				
Joo Og (KOR); Kim Ae-kyung (KOR)	5–1	Chen Hui (CHN); Xin Yani (CHN)	4–2	2–4	4–2	4–1	4–2	5–3			
Phonesamai Champamanivong (LAO); Kinnaly Sengchanh (LAO)	3–5	Chandra Maya Rai (NEP); Eliza Ranjit (NEP)	4–0	4–2	3–5	4–0	2–4	1–4	1–4	2–4	

=== Knockout round ===
Quarterfinals
A1	Nao Morita (JPN); Hikaru Yamashita (JPN)	4	4	5	1	0	4	4
B2	Chan Chia-hsin (TPE); Kuo Chien-chi (TPE)	1	2	3	4	4	1	2
A2	Enkhbaataryn Solongo (MGL); Bulgany Norovsüren (MGL)	2	0	0	0	4	4	5
B1	Yoon Soo-jung (KOR); Kim Ji-yeon (KOR)	4	4	4	4	1	1	7
C1	Cheng Chu-ling (TPE); Chen Yi-chia (TPE)	4	4	5	1	0	4	4
D1	Chen Hui (CHN); Xin Yani (CHN)	1	2	3	4	4	2	2
C2	Kana Morihara (JPN); Nao Kobayashi (JPN)	3	1	2	3	0
D1	Joo Og (KOR); Kim Ae-kyung (KOR)	5	4	4	5	4

Semifinals
A1	Nao Morita (JPN); Hikaru Yamashita (JPN)	3	0	1	1	3
B1	Yoon Soo-jung (KOR); Kim Ji-yeon (KOR)	5	4	4	4	5
C1	Cheng Chu-ling (TPE); Chen Yi-chia (TPE)	2	2	1	1	5	0
D1	Joo Og (KOR); Kim Ae-kyung (KOR)	4	4	4	4	3	4

Final
B1	Yoon Soo-jung (KOR); Kim Ji-yeon (KOR)	2	3	6	4	2	1
D1	Joo Og (KOR); Kim Ae-kyung (KOR)	4	5	8	2	4	4
