= Ekane =

Ekane is a surname. Notable people with the surname include:

- Anicet Ekane (1951–2025), Cameroonian politician and activist
- Paul Edingue Ekane (born 1990), Cameroonian swimmer
