= Venues of the 2014 Asian Games =

The 2014 Asian Games featured 49 competition venues and 48 training facilities on the sixteen days Games competition from September 19 to October 4, 2014. Of them, there are ten venues are newly built. All of the competition venues will be used after the opening ceremony bar football venues, which is held from September 14, 2014.

== Sporting venues ==
=== Bupyeong District ===
Venue	Sports	Capacity	Ref.
Samsan Gymnasium	Basketball	7,406	
Yeorumul Squash Courts	Squash	1,275	
Yeorumul Tennis Courts	Tennis, Soft tennis	5,802	

=== Dong District ===
Venue	Sports	Capacity	Ref.
Songnim Gymnasium	Volleyball	5,009	

=== Ganghwa County ===
Venue	Sports	Capacity	Ref.
Ganghwa Asiad BMX Track	Cycling	1,010	
Ganghwa Dolmens Gymnasium	Taekwondo, Wushu	4,014	

=== Gyeyang District ===
Venue	Sports	Capacity	Ref.
Gyeyang Asiad Archery Field	Archery	1,181	
Gyeyang Gymnasium	Badminton, Karate	4,304	
Incheon International Velodrome	Cycling (track)	1,508	

=== Jung District ===
Venue	Sports	Capacity	Ref.
Dowon Gymnasium	Judo, Wrestling	3,167	
Incheon Football Stadium	Football	20,500	
Yeongjong Baegunsan MTB Course	Cycling (mountain bike)	100	
Wangsan Marina	Sailing	N/A	

=== Nam District ===
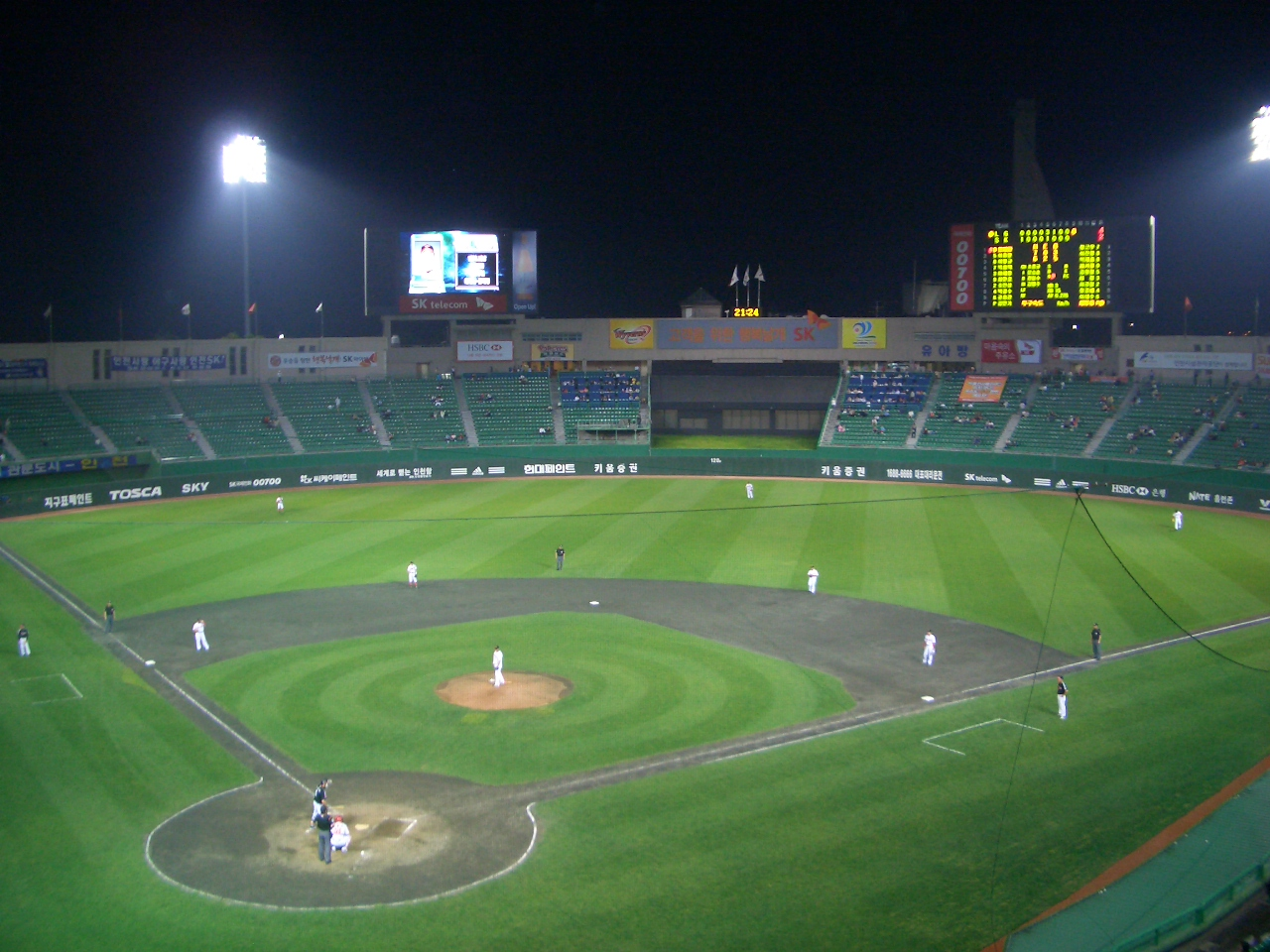
Munhak Baseball Stadium host baseball match

Venue	Sports	Capacity	Ref.
Incheon Munhak Stadium	Football	52,179	
Munhak Baseball Stadium	Baseball	27,877	
Munhak Park Tae-hwan Aquatics Center	Diving, Swimming, Synchronized swimming	3,006	

=== Namdong District ===
Venue	Sports	Capacity	Ref.
Namdong Asiad Rugby Field	Football, Rugby sevens	5,078	
Namdong Gymnasium	Gymnastics	8,828	

=== Seo District ===
Venue	Sports	Capacity	Ref.
Dream Park Aquatics Center	Modern pentathlon, Water polo	1,100	
Dream Park Complex	Modern pentathlon	1,264	
Dream Park Country Club	Golf	N/A	
Dream Park Equestrian Venue	Equestrian, Modern pentathlon	1,264	
Dream Park Modern Pentathlon Fencing Venue	Modern pentathlon	500	
Incheon Asiad Main Stadium	Athletics	61,074	
Yeonhui Cricket Ground	Cricket	2,353	

=== Yeonsu District ===
Venue	Sports	Capacity	Ref.
Moonlight Festival Garden Weightlifting Venue	Weightlifting	1,500	
Ongnyeon International Shooting Range	Shooting	1,337	
Seonhak Gymnasium	Boxing	2,104	
Seonhak Hockey Stadium	Field hockey	3,311	
Seonhak International Ice Rink	Handball	3,011	
Songdo Global University Beach Volleyball Venue	Beach volleyball	3,204	
Songdo Central Park	Triathlon	500	
Songdo Global University Gymnasium	Kabaddi	1,643	
Songdo LNG Baseball Stadium	Softball	1,376	
Songdo Road Cycling Course	Cycling (road)	500	

=== Outside Incheon ===
==== Gyeonggi Province ====
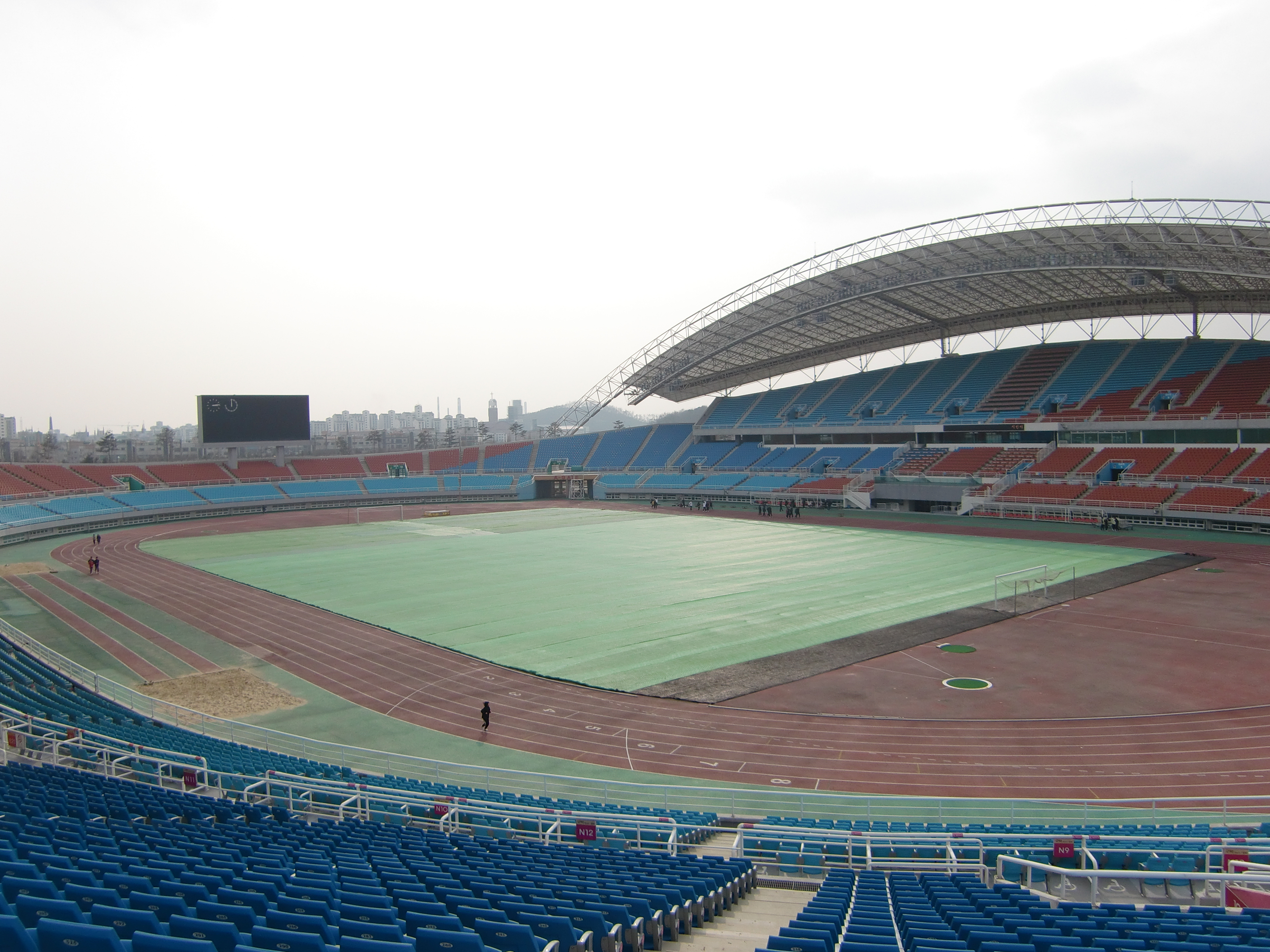
Ansan Wa~ Stadium was one of the five football stadium used in the Games

Venue	City	Sports	Capacity	Ref.
Ansan Sangroksu Gymnasium	Ansan	Volleyball	2,865	
Ansan Wa~ Stadium	Ansan	Football	35,000	
Anyang Hogye Gymnasium	Anyang	Bowling	270	
Bucheon Gymnasium	Bucheon	Sepaktakraw	5,420	
Goyang Gymnasium	Goyang	Fencing	6,216	
Goyang Stadium	Goyang	Football	41,311	
Gyeonggi Province Shooting Range	Hwaseong	Shooting	200	
Hwaseong Sports Complex	Hwaseong	Basketball	5,158	
Hwaseong Stadium	Hwaseong	Football	35,266	
Misari Rowing Center	Hanam	Canoeing	250	
Suwon Gymnasium	Suwon	Handball, Table tennis	5,145	

==== Others ====
Venue	City	Sports	Capacity	Ref.
Chungju Tangeum Lake International Rowing Center	Chungju	Rowing	1,100	
Mokdong Baseball Stadium	Seoul	Baseball	10,600	
