= Soft tennis at the 2014 Asian Games – Women's team =

Women's team at the 2014 Asian Games
- Venue: Yeorumul Tennis Courts
- Dates: 3–4 October 2014
- Competitors: 30 from 6 nations

Medalists
gold medal	South Korea; Joo Og, Kim Ae-kyung, Kim Bo-mi, Kim Ji-yeon, Yoon Soo-jung
silver medal	Japan; Nao Kobayashi, Kana Morihara, Nao Morita, Ayaka Oba, Hikaru Yamashita
bronze medal	Chinese Taipei; Chan Chia-hsin, Chen Yi-chia, Cheng Chu-ling, Chiang Wan-chi, Kuo Chien-chi
bronze medal	China; Chen Hui, Feng Zixuan, Liu Ge, Xin Yani, Zhong Yi

The women's team soft tennis event was part of the soft tennis programme and took place on October 3 and 4, at the Yeorumul Tennis Courts.

== Schedule ==
All times are Korea Standard Time (UTC+09:00)

Date	Time	Event
Friday, 3 October 2014	09:00	Preliminary round
Saturday, 4 October 2014	09:00	Semifinals
Saturday, 4 October 2014	12:00	Final

== Results ==
=== Preliminary round ===
==== Group A ====
Pos	Team	Pld	W	L	MF	MA	MD	Qualification
1	South Korea	2	2	0	5	1	+4	Semifinals
2	Japan	2	1	1	4	2	+2	Semifinals
3	Nepal	2	0	2	0	6	−6	

Source: OCA

3 October	South Korea	3–0	Nepal

Joo Og / Kim Ji-yeon	5–0	Chandra Maya Rai / Eliza Ranjit	4–1, 4–2, 4–1, 6–4, 4–0
Kim Bo-mi	4–0	Neeru Kayastha	4–1, 4–1, 4–2, 4–0
Yoon Soo-jung / Kim Ae-kyung	5–0	Rekha Tuladhar / Nira Kayastha	4–0, 4–1, 4–0, 4–0, 4–0

3 October	Japan	3–0	Nepal

Kana Morihara / Nao Kobayashi	5–0	Rekha Tuladhar / Nira Kayastha	4–0, 4–0, 4–0, 4–1, 4–0
Ayaka Oba	4–0	Chandra Maya Rai	4–1, 4–1, 4–0, 4–0
Nao Morita / Hikaru Yamashita	5–1	Eliza Ranjit / Neeru Kayastha	1–4, 4–1, 4–2, 4–1, 4–1, 4–1

3 October	Japan	1–2	South Korea

Nao Morita / Hikaru Yamashita	4–5	Joo Og / Kim Ji-yeon	1–4, 4–1, 4–1, 4–0, 3–5, 0–4, 6–4, 3–5, 3–7
Ayaka Oba	1–4	Kim Bo-mi	4–1, 5–7, 1–4, 1–4, 2–4
Kana Morihara / Nao Kobayashi	5–2	Yoon Soo-jung / Kim Ae-kyung	2–4, 4–2, 5–3, 1–4, 4–2, 7–5, 6–4

==== Group B ====
Pos	Team	Pld	W	L	MF	MA	MD	Qualification
1	China	2	2	0	5	1	+4	Semifinals
2	Chinese Taipei	2	1	1	4	2	+2	Semifinals
3	Mongolia	2	0	2	0	6	−6	

Source: OCA

3 October	China	3–0	Mongolia

Zhong Yi / Xin Yani	5–1	Enkhbaataryn Solongo / Bulgany Norovsüren	4–2, 4–2, 7–5, 3–5, 4–2, 4–2
Chen Hui	4–0	Amarsanaagiin Mönkh-Uchral	4–1, 4–0, 4–1, 4–1
Feng Zixuan / Liu Ge	5–1	Sugaryn Ganchimeg / Möngöntsetsegiin Anudari	4–2, 5–3, 3–5, 5–3, 4–0, 4–1

3 October	Chinese Taipei	3–0	Mongolia

Cheng Chu-ling / Chan Chia-hsin	5–2	Sugaryn Ganchimeg / Amarsanaagiin Mönkh-Uchral	4–0, 3–5, 4–1, 3–5, 4–1, 4–2, 4–0
Chiang Wan-chi	4–1	Bulgany Norovsüren	1–4, 4–0, 4–1, 4–1, 4–1
Chen Yi-chia / Kuo Chien-chi	5–0	Enkhbaataryn Solongo / Möngöntsetsegiin Anudari	4–0, 4–1, 5–3, 4–2, 5–3

3 October	Chinese Taipei	1–2	China

Cheng Chu-ling / Chen Yi-chia	3–5	Zhong Yi / Xin Yani	9–7, 1–4, 4–6, 2–4, 5–3, 4–1, 1–4, 1–4
Chiang Wan-chi	0–4	Chen Hui	1–4, 1–4, 1–4, 0–4
Chan Chia-hsin / Kuo Chien-chi	5–3	Feng Zixuan / Liu Ge	1–4, 5–3, 2–4, 4–2, 2–4, 4–1, 4–1, 5–3

=== Knockout round ===
Semifinals			Final
A1	South Korea	2
B2	Chinese Taipei	0	A1	South Korea	2
A2	Japan	2	A2	Japan	1
B1	China	1

==== Semifinals ====
4 October	South Korea	2–0	Chinese Taipei

Joo Og / Kim Ji-yeon	5–2	Chen Yi-chia / Kuo Chien-chi	4–0, 4–1, 5–3, 3–5, 6–4, 3–5, 4–2
Kim Bo-mi	4–0	Chiang Wan-chi	6–4, 4–1, 4–2, 4–2

4 October	Japan	2–1	China

Nao Morita / Hikaru Yamashita	5–3	Zhong Yi / Xin Yani	4–0, 4–2, 2–4, 4–2, 2–4, 4–2, 4–6, 7–5
Ayaka Oba	1–4	Chen Hui	1–4, 5–3, 3–5, 4–6, 1–4
Kana Morihara / Nao Kobayashi	5–2	Feng Zixuan / Liu Ge	4–0, 4–0, 1–4, 9–7, 2–4, 5–3, 4–0

==== Final ====
4 October	South Korea	2–1	Japan

Joo Og / Kim Ji-yeon	5–2	Kana Morihara / Nao Kobayashi	3–5, 4–1, 4–6, 4–1, 7–5, 4–2, 4–1
Kim Bo-mi	1–4	Ayaka Oba	2–4, 4–0, 1–4, 5–7, 0–4
Yoon Soo-jung / Kim Ae-kyung	5–2	Nao Morita / Hikaru Yamashita	4–2, 4–1, 5–3, 0–4, 1–4, 4–0, 4–2
