= Soft tennis at the 2014 Asian Games – Men's team =

Men's team at the 2014 Asian Games
- Venue: Yeorumul Tennis Courts
- Dates: 3–4 October 2014
- Competitors: 43 from 9 nations

Medalists
gold medal	South Korea; Kim Beom-jun, Kim Dong-hoon, Kim Hyeong-jun, Lee Sang-gwon, Park Kyu-cheol
silver medal	Japan; Takuya Katsura, Koji Kobayashi, Koichi Nagae, Keiya Nakamoto, Hidenori Shinohara
bronze medal	Chinese Taipei; Ho Meng-hsun, Lai Li-huang, Li Chia-hung, Lin Ting-chun, Lin Yu-tse
bronze medal	China; Li Ze, Lin Chengwei, Shi Xiaolin, Zhang Yusheng, Zhou Mo

The men's team soft tennis event was part of the soft tennis programme and took place on October 3 and 4, at the Yeorumul Tennis Courts.

== Schedule ==
All times are Korea Standard Time (UTC+09:00)

Date	Time	Event
Friday, 3 October 2014	09:00	Preliminary round
Saturday, 4 October 2014	09:00	Semifinals
Saturday, 4 October 2014	12:00	Final

== Results ==
=== Preliminary round ===
==== Group A ====
Pos	Team	Pld	W	L	MF	MA	MD	Qualification
1	Chinese Taipei	4	4	0	12	0	+12	Semifinals
2	China	4	3	1	8	4	+4	Semifinals
3	Indonesia	4	2	2	7	5	+2	
4	Nepal	4	1	3	3	9	−6	
5	Vietnam	4	0	4	0	12	−12	

Source: OCA

3 October	China	3–0	Vietnam

Zhang Yusheng / Lin Chengwei	5–0	Trần Thanh Hoàng / Huỳnh Chí Khương	4–1, 4–0, 5–3, 4–2, 4–1
Zhou Mo	4–0	Lâm Quang Trí	4–2, 4–1, 4–1, 4–0
Shi Xiaolin / Li Ze	5–0	—	Walkover

3 October	Indonesia	3–0	Nepal

Hendri Susilo Pramono / Edi Kusdaryanto	5–0	Sohan Dhauvadel / Manoj Subba	4–2, 6–4, 4–2, 4–2, 4–0
Prima Simpatiaji	4–0	Kamal Bahadur Bhandari	4–1, 4–2, 4–2, 5–3
Ferdy Fauzi Narun / Qamariah Ferly Montolalu	5–0	Shakti Sharma / Sthapit Ujjol	Walkover

3 October	Chinese Taipei	3–0	Vietnam

Ho Meng-hsun / Lai Li-huang	5–0	—	Walkover
Lin Yu-tse	4–0	—	Walkover
Lin Ting-chun / Li Chia-hung	5–0	—	Walkover

3 October	China	2–1	Indonesia

Zhang Yusheng / Lin Chengwei	5–3	Hendri Susilo Pramono / Edi Kusdaryanto	4–0, 1–4, 1–4, 4–1, 4–1, 5–3, 3–5, 9–7
Zhou Mo	3–4	Prima Simpatiaji	4–0, 5–3, 4–1, 0–4, 5–7, 1–4, 3–7
Shi Xiaolin / Li Ze	5–2	Ferdy Fauzi Narun / Qamariah Ferly Montolalu	4–1, 4–2, 6–4, 4–0, 1–4, 2–4, 4–1

3 October	Chinese Taipei	3–0	Nepal

Ho Meng-hsun / Lai Li-huang	5–0	Kamal Bahadur Bhandari / Manoj Subba	4–2, 4–0, 4–0, 4–2, 4–1
Lin Yu-tse	4–0	Sohan Dhauvadel	4–0, 4–1, 4–0, 4–0
Lin Ting-chun / Li Chia-hung	5–0	Shakti Sharma / Sthapit Ujjol	Walkover

3 October	Indonesia	3–0	Vietnam

Hendri Susilo Pramono / Edi Kusdaryanto	5–0	—	Walkover
Prima Simpatiaji	4–0	—	Walkover
Ferdy Fauzi Narun / Qamariah Ferly Montolalu	5–0	—	Walkover

3 October	Chinese Taipei	3–0	Indonesia

Ho Meng-hsun / Lai Li-huang	5–0	Ferdy Fauzi Narun / Qamariah Ferly Montolalu	4–1, 4–2, 4–2, 4–0, 6–4
Lin Yu-tse	4–1	Prima Simpatiaji	4–0, 5–7, 4–1, 4–1, 6–4
Lin Ting-chun / Li Chia-hung	5–0	Hendri Susilo Pramono / Edi Kusdaryanto	4–0, 4–0, 7–5, 4–2, 4–1

3 October	China	3–0	Nepal

Zhang Yusheng / Lin Chengwei	5–1	Kamal Bahadur Bhandari / Manoj Subba	1–4, 5–3, 4–1, 4–2, 9–7, 4–0
Zhou Mo	4–0	Sohan Dhauvadel	4–1, 4–2, 4–2, 4–1
Shi Xiaolin / Li Ze	5–0	Shakti Sharma / Sthapit Ujjol	Walkover

3 October	Chinese Taipei	3–0	China

Ho Meng-hsun / Lai Li-huang	5–1	Zhang Yusheng / Lin Chengwei	5–3, 4–0, 1–4, 4–2, 4–0, 6–4
Lin Yu-tse	4–0	Zhou Mo	5–3, 6–4, 4–1, 7–5
Lin Ting-chun / Li Chia-hung	5–0	Shi Xiaolin / Li Ze	4–0, 4–1, 4–1, 4–1, 6–4

3 October	Nepal	3–0	Vietnam

Sohan Dhauvadel / Manoj Subba	5–0	—	Walkover
Kamal Bahadur Bhandari	4–0	—	Walkover
Shakti Sharma / Sthapit Ujjol	5–0	—	Walkover

==== Group B ====
Pos	Team	Pld	W	L	MF	MA	MD	Qualification
1	South Korea	3	3	0	9	0	+9	Semifinals
2	Japan	3	2	1	6	3	+3	Semifinals
3	Mongolia	3	1	2	2	7	−5	
4	Laos	3	0	3	1	8	−7	

Source: OCA

3 October	Japan	3–0	Laos

Hidenori Shinohara / Koji Kobayashi	5–0	Khanthanou Phongsavanh / Ananda Khamphoumy	4–1, 4–1, 4–0, 4–1, 4–1
Koichi Nagae	4–0	Somxay Vannasak	4–1, 4–0, 4–2, 4–1
Takuya Katsura / Keiya Nakamoto	5–0	Chittakone Sayaline / Khampaseuth Bounsaath	4–2, 4–0, 4–2, 4–2, 6–4

3 October	South Korea	3–0	Mongolia

Kim Dong-hoon / Kim Beom-jun	5–1	Altankhuyagiin Damdin / Ochirsaikhany Bayasgalant	6–4, 4–0, 4–1, 3–5, 4–2, 4–0
Kim Hyeong-jun	4–0	Bolortuyaagiin Enkhjin	4–0, 4–0, 6–4, 4–1
Lee Sang-gwon / Park Kyu-cheol	5–1	Gantulgyn Enkhtüvshin / Enkhbaataryn Telmen	4–0, 6–4, 5–3, 5–3, 3–5, 4–0

3 October	Japan	3–0	Mongolia

Hidenori Shinohara / Koji Kobayashi	5–1	Altankhuyagiin Damdin / Ochirsaikhany Bayasgalant	2–4, 4–2, 4–0, 4–0, 4–1, 5–3
Koichi Nagae	4–0	Bolortuyaagiin Enkhjin	4–1, 4–0, 4–2, 4–1
Takuya Katsura / Keiya Nakamoto	5–0	Enkhbaataryn Telmen / Gantulgyn Enkhtüvshin	Walkover

3 October	South Korea	3–0	Laos

Lee Sang-gwon / Park Kyu-cheol	5–0	Khanthanou Phongsavanh / Ananda Khamphoumy	4–1, 4–0, 4–1, 4–2, 4–0
Kim Hyeong-jun	4–0	Somxay Vannasak	5–3, 4–0, 4–1, 4–1
Kim Dong-hoon / Kim Beom-jun	5–0	Chittakone Sayaline / Khampaseuth Bounsaath	4–0, 4–0, 4–2, 4–0, 4–1

3 October	Japan	0–3	South Korea

Hidenori Shinohara / Koji Kobayashi	4–5	Kim Dong-hoon / Kim Beom-jun	3–5, 4–1, 6–8, 5–3, 4–2, 4–0, 2–4, 2–4, 3–7
Koichi Nagae	0–4	Kim Hyeong-jun	0–4, 1–4, 1–4, 0–4
Takuya Katsura / Keiya Nakamoto	2–5	Lee Sang-gwon / Park Kyu-cheol	4–1, 4–6, 1–4, 3–5, 1–4, 4–1, 2–4

3 October	Mongolia	2–1	Laos

Altankhuyagiin Damdin / Ochirsaikhany Bayasgalant	5–1	Khanthanou Phongsavanh / Ananda Khamphoumy	4–0, 8–6, 4–2, 4–2, 4–6, 4–2
Enkhbaataryn Telmen	4–2	Somxay Vannasak	3–5, 4–0, 1–4, 4–1, 4–1, 4–0
Gantulgyn Enkhtüvshin / Bolortuyaagiin Enkhjin	0–5	Chittakone Sayaline / Khampaseuth Bounsaath	Walkover

=== Knockout round ===
Semifinals			Final
A1	Chinese Taipei	0
B2	Japan	2	B2	Japan	0
A2	China	0	B1	South Korea	2
B1	South Korea	2

==== Semifinals ====
4 October	Chinese Taipei	0–2	Japan

Lin Ting-chun / Li Chia-hung	2–5	Hidenori Shinohara / Koji Kobayashi	5–3, 1–4, 2–4, 0–4, 3–5, 4–2, 2–4
Lin Yu-tse	0–4	Koichi Nagae	1–4, 1–4, 1–4, 3–5

4 October	China	0–2	South Korea

Zhang Yusheng / Lin Chengwei	1–5	Lee Sang-gwon / Park Kyu-cheol	1–4, 4–6, 4–2, 3–5, 1–4, 5–7
Zhou Mo	0–4	Kim Hyeong-jun	4–6, 1–4, 4–6, 2–4

==== Final ====
4 October	Japan	0–2	South Korea

Hidenori Shinohara / Koji Kobayashi	3–5	Kim Dong-hoon / Kim Beom-jun	4–2, 2–4, 6–4, 5–7, 1–4, 2–4, 4–0, 2–4
Koichi Nagae	2–4	Kim Hyeong-jun	2–4, 3–5, 6–4, 10–8, 2–4, 2–4
