= Anthony Ervin =

American swimmer (born 1981)

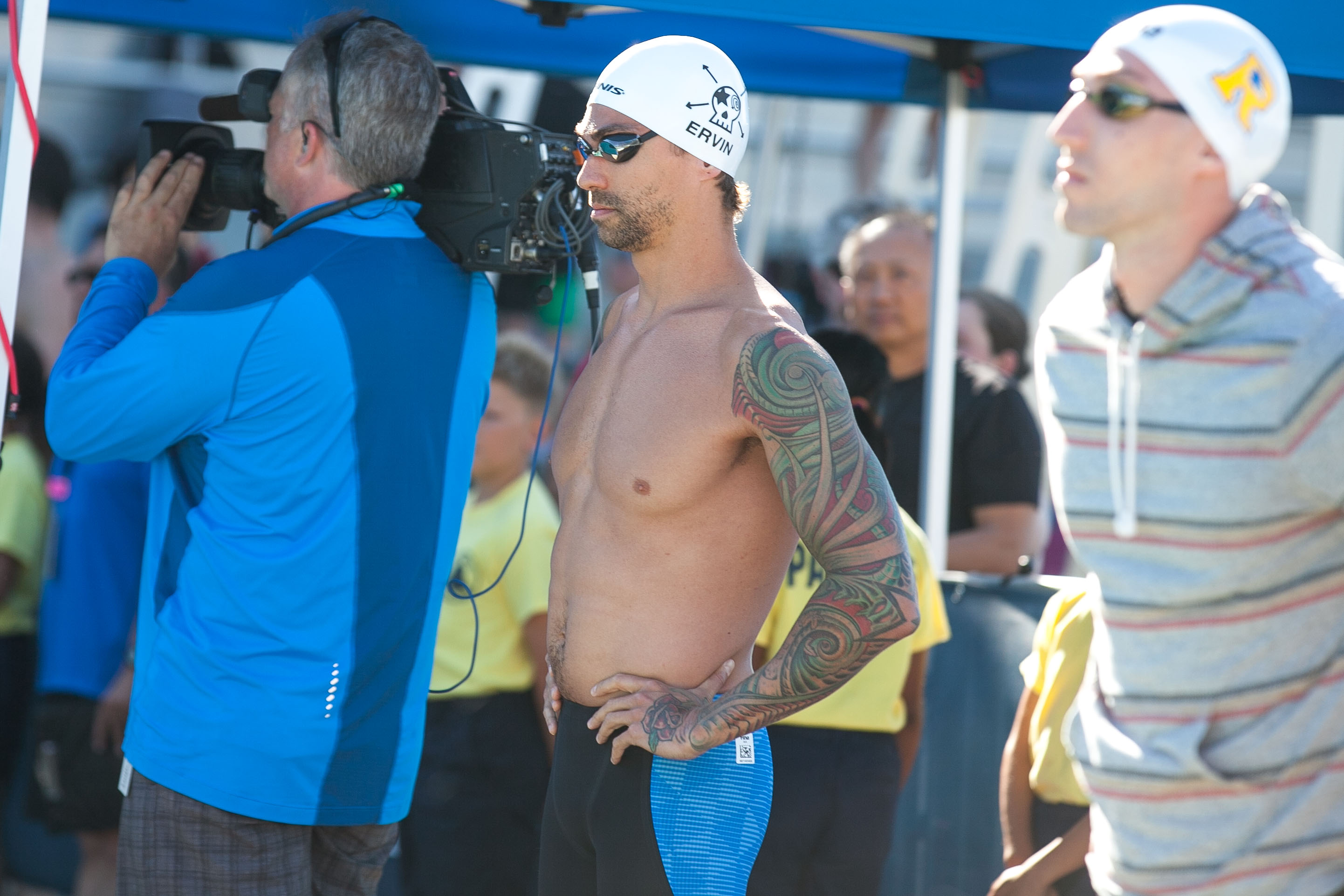
- Ervin in 2016

Personal information
- Full name: Anthony Lee Ervin
- Nickname: Tony
- National team: United States
- Born: May 26, 1981 (age 45) Santa Clarita, California, U.S.
- Height: 6 ft 3 in (1.91 m)
- Weight: 176 lb (80 kg)
- Website: AnthonyErvin.com

Sport
- Sport: Swimming
- Strokes: Freestyle
- College team: University of California, Berkeley
- Coach: Nort Thornton, Dave Durden (U. Cal. Berkeley)
Medal record
Men's swimming
Representing United States
Olympic Games
Gold medal – first place	2000 Sydney	50 m freestyle
Gold medal – first place	2016 Rio de Janeiro	50 m freestyle
Gold medal – first place	2016 Rio de Janeiro	4×100 m freestyle
Silver medal – second place	2000 Sydney	4×100 m freestyle
World Championships (LC)
Gold medal – first place	2001 Fukuoka	50 m freestyle
Gold medal – first place	2001 Fukuoka	100 m freestyle
Silver medal – second place	2013 Barcelona	4×100 m freestyle
World Championships (SC)
Gold medal – first place	2012 Istanbul	4×100 m freestyle
Gold medal – first place	2012 Istanbul	4×100 m medley
Bronze medal – third place	2012 Istanbul	50 m freestyle
Pan Pacific Championships
Silver medal – second place	2002 Yokohama	50 m freestyle
Silver medal – second place	2002 Yokohama	4×100 m freestyle
Silver medal – second place	2014 Gold Coast	50 m freestyle
Silver medal – second place	2014 Gold Coast	4×100 m freestyle
Maccabiah Games
Gold medal – first place	2017 Israel	50 m freestyle
Gold medal – first place	2017 Israel	100 m freestyle
Gold medal – first place	2017 Israel	4×100 m medley
Silver medal – second place	2017 Israel	4×100 m freestyle

Anthony Lee Ervin (born May 26, 1981) is an American competitive swimmer who has won four Olympic medals and two World Championship golds. At the 2000 Summer Olympics, he won a gold medal in the men's 50-meter freestyle, and earned a silver medal as a member of the second-place United States relay team in the 4×100-meter freestyle event. He was the second swimmer of African descent, after Anthony Nesty of Suriname, to win an individual gold medal in Olympic swimming. He is the first United States citizen of African descent to earn a gold medal in an individual Olympic swimming event. In 2017, he knelt for the US national anthem prior to the start of a competition in Brazil.

Ervin stopped swimming competitively at the age of 22 in 2003 and auctioned off his 2000 Olympic gold medal on eBay to aid survivors of the 2004 tsunami, but he began to train again in 2011.

Ervin competed in the 50-meter freestyle event at the 2012 Summer Olympics where he placed fifth. In the spring of 2016, Akashic Books released Ervin's memoir, Chasing Water, co-authored by Ervin and Constantine Markides. At the 2016 Summer Olympics, 16 years after his first Olympic gold medal, he won the event for the second time, at the age of 35, becoming the oldest individual Olympic gold medal winner in swimming.

== Personal life ==
Ervin is African-American and Jewish, and was born in Hollywood. He is of Ashkenazi Jewish descent on his mother's side and African-American and Indian-American descent on his father's. He was raised in Valencia, Santa Clarita, California. Ervin has described himself as a "Zen Buddhist". He practiced Zen meditation. In July 2017 he said: "I'm proud to be American and I'm proud to be a Jew."

While living in Santa Clarita, he swam for Canyons Aquatic Club, and also competed on Hart High School's swim team. Anthony enrolled and swam for the University of California, Berkeley, under Hall of Fame Head Coach Nort Thornton Jr., receiving his bachelor's degree in English in 2010. Ervin also received coaching from Berkeley Head Coach Dave Durden.

He has pursued a graduate degree in sport, culture and education at Berkeley.

As a youth, Ervin had tics that he described "as an itch that constantly [wanted] to be scratched"; as a young adult he would attract negative attention for the symptoms. He attributes his success in the pool to his Tourette syndrome. He states that swimming helped him manage his facial tics when he was young and the condition made him learn how to cope with anxiety from an early age, which benefitted him when he was in the Olympic finals. Ervin was a youth ambassador for the Tourette Association of America from 2017 to 2018.

== Career ==
=== 2000: Sydney Summer Olympic Games ===
At the 2000 United States Olympic Trials in Indianapolis, Ervin competed in two events: the 50-meter and 100-meter freestyle. In the finals of the 100-meter freestyle, Ervin finished fifth with a time of 49.29, ensuring him a spot on the 4×100-meter freestyle relay. In the final of the 50-meter freestyle, Ervin finished second to Gary Hall Jr. with a time of 21.80.

2000 Summer Olympics
Gold medal – first place	50 m freestyle	21.98
Silver medal – second place	4x100 m freestyle relay	3:13.86 (AM)

At the 2000 Summer Olympics, Ervin won one gold and one silver medal. In his first final, the 4×100-meter freestyle relay, Ervin teamed up with Gary Hall Jr., Neil Walker and Jason Lezak. Going into the final, the Americans had never lost the event at the Olympics. Ervin swam the leadoff leg in 48.89, the second best lead-off behind Michael Klim's world record time of 48.18. The American team ended up finishing in second place with a time of 3:13.86 behind Australia, who finished in a world record time of 3:13.67. In the final of the 50-meter freestyle, Ervin tied Gary Hall Jr. for the gold with a time of 21.98.

After the gold medal race, reporter Jim Gray asked Ervin what it felt like to be the first swimmer of African American descent to win gold. Referring to this moment in a 2012 interview, Ervin stated, "I didn't know a thing about what it was like to be part of the black experience. But now I do. It's like winning gold and having a bunch of old white people ask you what it's like to be black. That is my black experience."

=== 2001–2003: World Championships and Pan Pacs ===
Ervin won two gold medals at the 2001 World Aquatics Championships in the 50-meter freestyle and the 100-meter freestyle. He also competed in the 4 x 100 freestyle relay, but the United States relay team was disqualified. At the 2002 Pan Pacific Swimming Championships Ervin won silver medals in both the 50-meter freestyle and the 4 x 100 freestyle relay.

=== Hiatus ===
In 2003, he took the abrupt decision to quit the sport at the age of 22. During the following years he tried many things, such as learning guitar and Buddhism, and he stopped telling people he had used to be an Olympic swimming champion. Then he began abusing drugs. At times he was hardly able to rise from a sofa for days. He started to train again in 2011.

=== 2012: Comeback and Summer Olympics ===
Twelve years after competing in his last Olympics as a 19-year-old, Ervin qualified for his second United States Olympic team as a 31-year-old at the 2012 United States Olympic Trials in Omaha, Nebraska, by finishing second in the men's 50-meter freestyle. His time of 21.60 seconds was only one one-hundredth (0.01) of a second behind Cullen Jones (21.59) and also a personal best for Ervin. At the 2012 Summer Olympics in London, he finished fifth in the finals of the 50-meter freestyle with a time of 21.78 seconds. Ervin made history with Jones and Lia Neal by being the first African-Americans on a U.S. Olympic swim team with more than one African-American swimmer.

=== 2013–14: World Championships and Pan Pacs ===
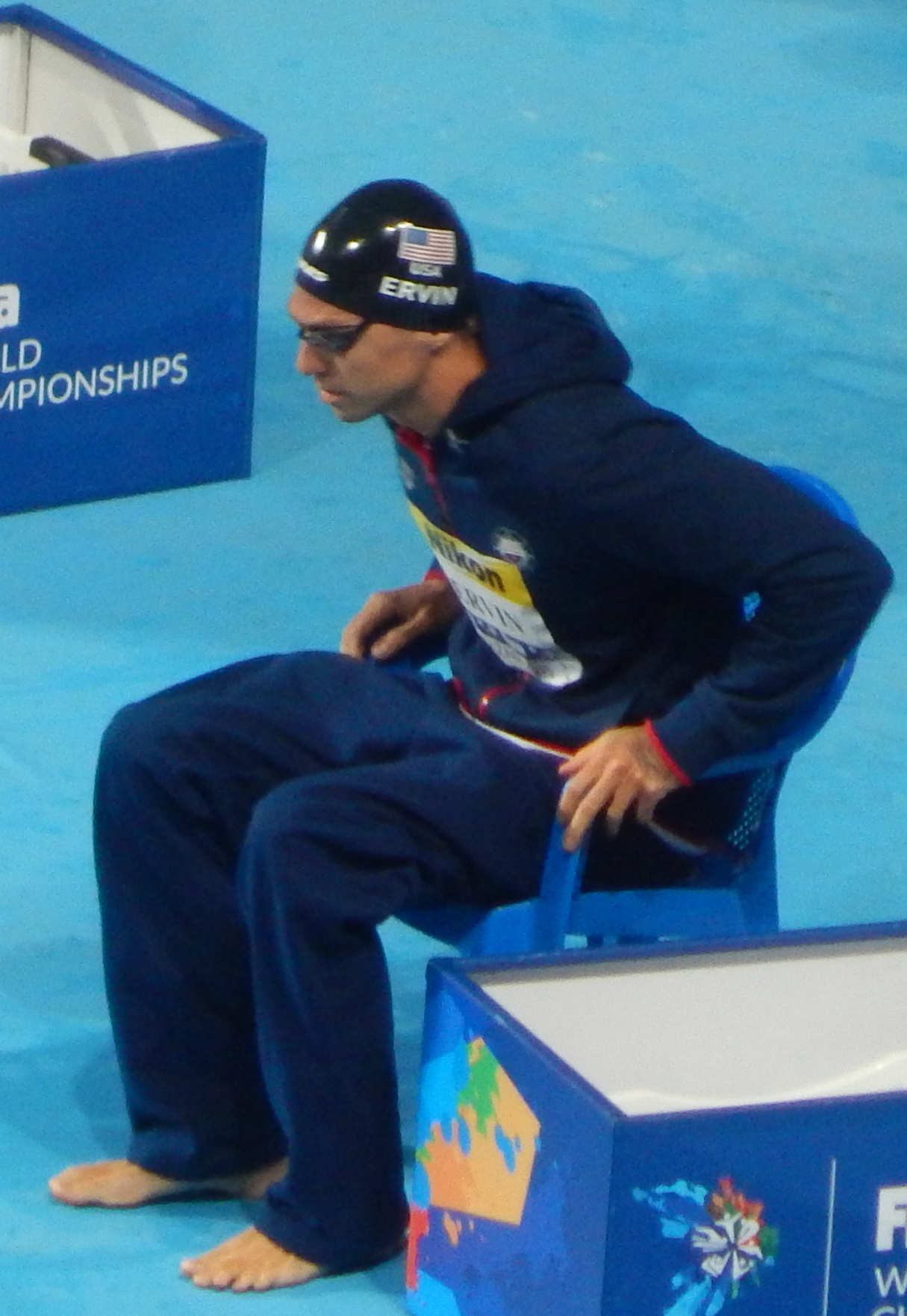
Ervin at the 2015 World Championships

At the 2013 US National Championships, Ervin qualified to swim at the 2013 World Aquatics Championships in Barcelona by placing second in the 50-meter freestyle with a time of 21.70, and third in the 100-meter freestyle with a time of 48.49.

In his first event at the World Championships, Ervin combined with Nathan Adrian, Ryan Lochte and Jimmy Feigen in the 4×100-meter freestyle relay, with the team finishing behind France. Swimming the third leg, Ervin recorded a split of 47.44, and the team finished with a final time of 3:11.44. Ervin's split was the fastest among the Americans.

In his only individual event, the 50-meter freestyle, Ervin entered the final as the second seed with a semi-final time of 21.42, a personal best for him and only 2-hundredths of a second behind the American record. In the final, Ervin finished in 6th place with a time of 21.65.

In 2014, on the Gold Coast, Ervin collected 2 silver medals at the Pan Pacs.

=== 2016 Summer Olympics ===
2016 Summer Olympics
Gold medal – first place	50 m freestyle	21.40
Gold medal – first place	4x100 m freestyle relay	3:09.92

In the 2016 Olympics, Ervin swam the 50 m freestyle, placing 1st in the final with a time of 21.40 seconds. At the age of 35, this made him the oldest individual Olympic gold medal winner in swimming, taking the record from Michael Phelps. He also won a gold medal in the 4 × 100 m freestyle relay with United States by swimming in the morning heat.

=== 2017 Maccabiah Games ===
At the 2017 Maccabiah Games, Ervin was honored as the final torchbearer who lit the flame to officially open the event. He then won gold medals in the 50-meter freestyle (with a time of 22.05 seconds), the 100-meter freestyle (with a time of 49.76 seconds), and the 4 × 100 m medley relay (with the Americans clocking 3:41.82). In the special 4x50m relay race between Israeli and American all-star teams, American Olympic champions Ervin, Lenny Krayzelburg (four Olympic golds), and Jason Lezak (four Olympic golds), with masters swimmer Alex Blavatnik, swam a time of 1:48.23 and defeated Israeli Olympians Guy Barnea, Yoav Bruck, Eran Groumi, and Tal Stricker, who had a time of 1:51.25.

=== 2021 ===
==== 2020 US Olympic Trials ====
At the 2020 USA Swimming Olympic Trials in Omaha, Nebraska and held in June 2021 due to the COVID-19 pandemic, Ervin competed in the 50-meter freestyle. He swam a 22.61 in the heats, ranked 23rd overall, and did not qualify for the 2020 Summer Olympics.

==== Swim clinic at World Championships ====
The week of competition at the 2021 World Short Course Championships, held at Etihad Arena in Abu Dhabi, United Arab Emirates, Ervin conducted a swim clinic with Florian Wellbrock of Germany for young swimmers.

== Accolades ==
In 2003, he was inducted into the Southern California Jewish Sports Hall of Fame.

At the 2017 Maccabiah Games,

== Autobiography ==
Ervin's memoir was released by Akashic Books in 2016. Co-authored by Ervin and Constantine Markides, Chasing Water received The Buck Dawson Authors Award from the International Swimming Hall of Fame in 2018.

== See also ==
- List of Jewish swimmers
- List of Olympic medalists in swimming (men)
- List of University of California, Berkeley alumni
- List of World Aquatics Championships medalists in swimming (men)
- World record progression 50 metres freestyle

Records
Preceded by Roland Schoeman	Men's 50-meter freestyle world record-holder (short course); March 23, 2000 – January 28, 2001	Succeeded by Mark Foster
