= Canyons Aquatic Club =

USA Swimming Club in Santa Clarita, California

Canyons Aquatic Club, (CAC or CANY) is a competitive swim team located in Santa Clarita, California. CAC is a USA Swimming affiliated swim team competing in the Southern California Swimming region. CAC's home pool is located on the campus of College of the Canyons but also has practice locations at the Santa Clarita Aquatics Center, Santa Clarita Park, and the Antelope Valley.

Founded in 1978, CAC has grown into what is now one of the largest swim clubs in Southern California. Its most notable alumni are Olympic medalists Anthony Ervin (three gold, one silver), Abbey Weitzeil (one gold, one silver), and Gabe Woodward (one bronze).

Canyons has over 600 members at various competitive levels, ranging from novice/introductory levels through to nationally ranked competitors. As of 2000 the Canyons Aquatic Club had produced a U.S. Olympic team alternate, four USA national titlists, two U.S. Olympic Festival selections and numerous high school All-Americans. In 2010 five of its swimmers qualified for the Conoco Phillips National Championships. In 2012, Canyons Aquatics sent seven swimmers to the United States Swimming Olympic Trials, the most in club history.

The current head coach of the club is Kyle Hastings. Prior, notable, head coaches include Kevin Nielsen(2019-2021), Coley Stickels (2012-2017, Jeff Conwell (2005-2012), Bruce Patmos (1989-2005), Jennifer Salles-Cunha (~1987-1989), Steve Neale (~1985-1987), Steve Schomber (~1985), Fernando Maldonado (~1984), and Jerry and Joe Walsh (~1978-1984)
