= Swimming at the 2012 Summer Olympics – Men's 50 metre freestyle =

Men's 50 metre freestyle at the Games of the XXX Olympiad
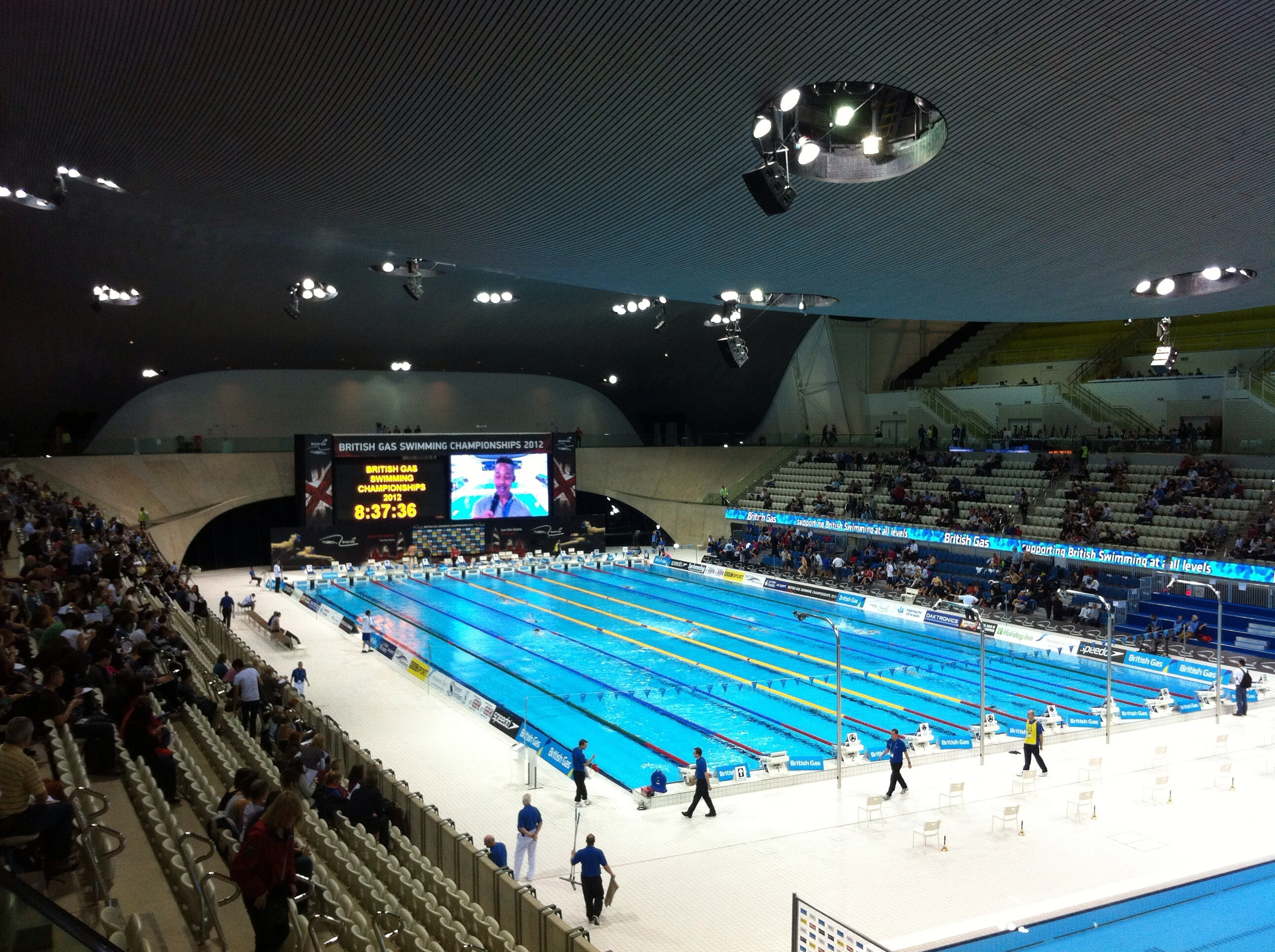
- London Aquatics Centre (2012)
- Venue: London Aquatics Centre
- Dates: August 2, 2012 (heats & semifinals); August 3, 2012 (final)
- Competitors: 58 from 51 nations
- Winning time: 21.34

Medalists
| 1st place, gold medalist(s) | | Florent Manaudou | France |
| 2nd place, silver medalist(s) | | Cullen Jones | United States |
| 3rd place, bronze medalist(s) | | César Cielo | Brazil |

The men's 50 metre freestyle event at the 2012 Summer Olympics took place on 2–3 August at the London Aquatics Centre in London, United Kingdom.

France's Florent Manaudou stunned the entire field to join his sister Laure Manaudou on top of the podium for the Olympic sprint freestyle title. Swimming in lane seven, the dark horse threw down a scorching time and a textile best of 21.34 to hold off U.S. swimmer Cullen Jones and the event's Brazilian world record holder and defending Olympic champion César Cielo by two-tenths of a second, a sizable chunk in the Olympic swimming's shortest race. Jones took home the silver in 21.54 to match his semifinal time in the process, while Cielo missed his chance to defend the title with a bronze medal in 21.59.

Cielo's teammate Bruno Fratus finished outside the podium by almost a fingertip with a fourth-place time in 21.61. After twelve years of absence as a 31-year-old, U.S. swimmer Anthony Ervin, who previously tied with Gary Hall, Jr. for the gold in 2000, managed to pull off a fifth-place finish in 21.78. Ervin was followed in sixth and seventh by four-time Olympians Roland Mark Schoeman of South Africa (21.80) and George Bovell of Trinidad and Tobago (21.82). Plagued by injury, Australia's Eamon Sullivan struggled to mount a sprint challenge in a high-calibre race as he finished eighth in 21.98.

Earlier in the semifinals, Australia's top sprinter James Magnussen missed the star-studded roster with an eleventh-place time in 22.00. Other notable swimmers featured Swedish veteran Stefan Nystrand (22.32) and France's Amaury Leveaux (22.35), the defending silver medalist, both of whom fell short of the semifinal field by a small fraction of a second on the morning prelims.

== Records ==
Prior to this competition, the existing world and Olympic records were as follows.

| World record | César Cielo (BRA) | 20.91 | São Paulo, Brazil | 18 December 2009 |
| Olympic record | César Cielo (BRA) | 21.30 | Beijing, China | 16 August 2008 |

== Qualification ==
The Olympic Qualifying Time for the event was 22.11 seconds. Up to two swimmers per National Olympic Committee (NOC) could automatically qualify by swimming that time at an approved qualification event. The Olympic Selection Time was 22.88 seconds. Up to one swimmer per NOC meeting that time was eligible for selection, allocated by world ranking until the maximum quota for all swimming events was reached. NOCs without a male swimmer qualified in any event could also use their universality place.

== Competition format ==
The competition consists of three rounds: heats, semifinals, and a final. The swimmers with the best 16 times in the heats advance to the semifinals. The swimmers with the best 8 times in the semifinals advance to the final. Swim-offs are used as necessary to break ties for advancement to the next round.

== Results ==
=== Heats ===
The swimmers with the top 16 times, regardless of heat, advanced to the semifinals.

| Rank | Heat | Lane | Name | Nation | Time | Notes |
|---|---|---|---|---|---|---|
| 1 | 6 | 3 | George Bovell | Trinidad and Tobago | 21.77 | Q |
| 2 | 8 | 4 | César Cielo | Brazil | 21.80 | Q |
| 3 | 8 | 5 | Bruno Fratus | Brazil | 21.82 | Q |
| 4 | 6 | 4 | Anthony Ervin | United States | 21.83 | Q |
| 5 | 7 | 1 | Roland Schoeman | South Africa | 21.92 | Q |
| 6 | 7 | 4 | Cullen Jones | United States | 21.95 | Q |
| 7 | 6 | 5 | Andrey Grechin | Russia | 22.09 | Q |
| 7 | 7 | 7 | Andriy Govorov | Ukraine | 22.09 | Q |
| 7 | 8 | 3 | Florent Manaudou | France | 22.09 | Q |
| 10 | 7 | 5 | James Magnussen | Australia | 22.11 | Q |
| 11 | 8 | 6 | Luca Dotto | Italy | 22.12 | Q |
| 11 | 8 | 7 | Gideon Louw | South Africa | 22.12 | Q |
| 13 | 8 | 8 | Brent Hayden | Canada | 22.15 | Q |
| 14 | 6 | 6 | Krisztián Takács | Hungary | 22.19 | Q |
| 15 | 6 | 8 | Norbert Trandafir | Romania | 22.22 | Q, NR |
| 16 | 7 | 3 | Eamon Sullivan | Australia | 22.27 | Q |
| 17 | 6 | 2 | Stefan Nystrand | Sweden | 22.32 | |
| 18 | 7 | 6 | Amaury Leveaux | France | 22.35 | |
| 19 | 7 | 2 | Marco Orsi | Italy | 22.36 | |
| 20 | 6 | 7 | Adam Brown | Great Britain | 22.39 | |
| 21 | 8 | 2 | Sergey Fesikov | Russia | 22.42 | |
| 22 | 5 | 3 | Jasper Aerents | Belgium | 22.43 | |
| 23 | 6 | 1 | Hanser García | Cuba | 22.45 | |
| 24 | 4 | 4 | Roy-Allan Burch | Bermuda | 22.47 | NR |
| 25 | 7 | 8 | Ari-Pekka Liukkonen | Finland | 22.57 | |
| 26 | 5 | 1 | Shi Yang | China | 22.64 | |
| 27 | 5 | 4 | David Dunford | Kenya | 22.72 | |
| 28 | 5 | 7 | Mario Todorović | Croatia | 22.75 | |
| 29 | 4 | 5 | Barry Murphy | Ireland | 22.76 | |
| 30 | 8 | 1 | Ioannis Kalargaris | Greece | 22.80 | |
| 31 | 5 | 8 | Árni Már Árnason | Iceland | 22.81 | NR |
| 32 | 5 | 5 | Brett Fraser | Cayman Islands | 22.91 | |
| 33 | 5 | 6 | Kacper Majchrzak | Poland | 23.00 | |
| 34 | 4 | 3 | Shehab Younis | Egypt | 23.16 | |
| 35 | 5 | 2 | Federico Grabich | Argentina | 23.30 | |
| 36 | 4 | 6 | Luke Hall | Swaziland | 23.48 | NR |
| 37 | 4 | 2 | Kareem Ennab | Jordan | 24.09 | |
| 38 | 4 | 7 | Chakyl Camal | Mozambique | 24.43 | |
| 39 | 4 | 1 | Mahfizur Rahman Sagor | Bangladesh | 24.64 | |
| 40 | 3 | 6 | Kerson Hadley | Federated States of Micronesia | 24.82 | |
| 41 | 3 | 4 | Adama Ouedraogo | Burkina Faso | 25.26 | NR |
| 42 | 4 | 8 | Zachary Payne | Cook Islands | 25.26 | |
| 43 | 3 | 5 | Emile Bakale | Republic of the Congo | 25.64 | |
| 44 | 3 | 2 | Kouassi Brou | Ivory Coast | 25.82 | |
| 45 | 3 | 3 | Tolga Akcayli | Saint Vincent and the Grenadines | 26.27 | |
| 46 | 3 | 1 | Giordan Harris | Marshall Islands | 26.88 | |
| 47 | 3 | 8 | Prasiddha Jung Shah | Nepal | 26.93 | |
| 48 | 3 | 7 | Hemthon Ponloeu | Cambodia | 27.03 | |
| 49 | 2 | 2 | Abdourahman Osman | Djibouti | 27.25 | |
| 50 | 2 | 6 | Mohamed Elkhedr | Sudan | 27.26 | |
| 51 | 2 | 3 | Ching Maou Wei | American Samoa | 27.30 | |
| 52 | 2 | 7 | Jackson Niyomugabo | Rwanda | 27.38 | |
| 53 | 2 | 5 | Ganzi Mugula | Uganda | 27.58 | |
| 54 | 2 | 4 | Paul Edingue Ekane | Cameroon | 27.87 | |
| 55 | 1 | 5 | Christian Nassif | Central African Republic | 28.04 | |
| 56 | 1 | 4 | Phathana Inthavong | Laos | 28.17 | |
| 57 | 2 | 1 | Mulualem Girma Teshale | Ethiopia | 28.99 | |
| 58 | 1 | 3 | Wilfried Tevoedjre | Benin | 29.77 | |

=== Semifinals ===
The swimmers with the top 8 times, regardless of heat, advanced to the final.

| Rank | Heat | Lane | Name | Nation | Time | Notes |
|---|---|---|---|---|---|---|
| 1 | 1 | 3 | Cullen Jones | United States | 21.54 | Q |
| 1 | 1 | 4 | César Cielo | Brazil | 21.54 | Q |
| 3 | 1 | 5 | Anthony Ervin | United States | 21.62 | Q |
| 4 | 2 | 5 | Bruno Fratus | Brazil | 21.63 | Q |
| 5 | 2 | 4 | George Bovell | Trinidad and Tobago | 21.77 | Q |
| 6 | 2 | 2 | Florent Manaudou | France | 21.80 | Q |
| 7 | 1 | 8 | Eamon Sullivan | Australia | 21.88 | Q |
| 8 | 2 | 3 | Roland Schoeman | South Africa | 21.88 | Q |
| 9 | 1 | 7 | Gideon Louw | South Africa | 21.92 | |
| 10 | 2 | 6 | Andrey Grechin | Russia | 21.98 | |
| 11 | 1 | 2 | James Magnussen | Australia | 22.00 | |
| 12 | 1 | 1 | Krisztián Takács | Hungary | 22.01 | |
| 13 | 2 | 7 | Luca Dotto | Italy | 22.09 | |
| 14 | 1 | 6 | Andriy Govorov | Ukraine | 22.12 | |
| 15 | 2 | 1 | Brent Hayden | Canada | 22.12 | |
| 16 | 2 | 8 | Norbert Trandafir | Romania | 22.30 | |

=== Final ===
| Rank | Lane | Name | Nation | Time | Notes |
|---|---|---|---|---|---|
| 1st place, gold medalist(s) | 7 | Florent Manaudou | France | 21.34 | |
| 2nd place, silver medalist(s) | 5 | Cullen Jones | United States | 21.54 | |
| 3rd place, bronze medalist(s) | 4 | César Cielo | Brazil | 21.59 | |
| 4 | 6 | Bruno Fratus | Brazil | 21.61 | |
| 5 | 3 | Anthony Ervin | United States | 21.78 | |
| 6 | 8 | Roland Mark Schoeman | South Africa | 21.80 | |
| 7 | 2 | George Bovell | Trinidad and Tobago | 21.82 | |
| 8 | 1 | Eamon Sullivan | Australia | 21.98 | |
