= 2014 FINA World Swimming Championships (25 m) – Men's 100 metre freestyle =

Men's 100 metre freestyle at the 2014 FINA World Swimming Championships (25 m)
- Location: Doha, Qatar
- Dates: 6 December (heats and semifinals); 7 December (final)
- Competitors: 152 from 102 nations
- Winning time: 45.75

Medalists
| gold medal | César Cielo | Brazil |
| silver medal | Florent Manaudou | France |
| bronze medal | Danila Izotov | Russia |

The Men's 100 metre freestyle competition of the 2014 FINA World Swimming Championships (25 m) was held in Doha, Qatar, with the heats and the semifinals on 6 December and the final on 7 December.

== Records ==
Prior to the competition, the existing world and championship records were as follows.

| | Name | Nation | Time | Location | Date |
|---|---|---|---|---|---|
| World record | Amaury Leveaux | France | 44.94 | Rijeka | 13 December 2008 |
| Championship record | Vladimir Morozov | Russia | 45.51 | Doha | 3 December 2014 |

== Results ==
=== Heats ===
The heats were held at 09:55.

| Rank | Heat | Lane | Name | Nationality | Time | Notes |
|---|---|---|---|---|---|---|
| 1 | 16 | 4 | César Cielo | Brazil | 46.50 | Q |
| 2 | 15 | 4 | Ning Zetao | China | 46.76 | Q, AS, WD |
| 3 | 17 | 2 | João de Lucca | Brazil | 46.84 | Q |
| 4 | 15 | 5 | Tommaso D'Orsogna | Australia | 46.88 | Q |
| 5 | 16 | 5 | Cameron McEvoy | Australia | 46.89 | Q |
| 6 | 17 | 5 | Danila Izotov | Russia | 47.00 | Q |
| 7 | 17 | 0 | Pieter Timmers | Belgium | 47.05 | Q |
| 8 | 16 | 6 | Mehdy Metella | France | 47.26 | Q |
| 9 | 17 | 3 | Katsumi Nakamura | Japan | 47.32 | Q |
| 10 | 17 | 4 | Florent Manaudou | France | 47.38 | Q |
| 11 | 16 | 3 | Jimmy Feigen | United States | 47.40 | Q |
| 12 | 17 | 6 | Shinri Shioura | Japan | 47.45 | Q |
| 13 | 16 | 2 | Luca Dotto | Italy | 47.68 | Q |
| 14 | 15 | 6 | Leith Shankland | South Africa | 47.72 | Q |
| 15 | 15 | 2 | Hanser García | Cuba | 47.73 | Q |
| 16 | 15 | 1 | Brett Fraser | Cayman Islands | 47.81 | Q |
| 17 | 14 | 0 | Conor Dwyer | United States | 47.86 | Q |
| 18 | 14 | 6 | Alexandre Haldemann | Switzerland | 47.91 | |
| 19 | 13 | 1 | Cristian Quintero | Venezuela | 47.92 | |
| 20 | 16 | 8 | Federico Grabich | Argentina | 47.97 | |
| 21 | 16 | 1 | Ben Proud | Great Britain | 48.01 | |
| 22 | 14 | 9 | Péter Holoda | Hungary | 48.02 | |
| 23 | 15 | 7 | Mindaugas Sadauskas | Lithuania | 48.04 | |
| 24 | 15 | 0 | Ben Hockin | Paraguay | 48.10 | |
| 25 | 17 | 8 | Sahnoune Ouassama | Algeria | 48.21 | |
| 26 | 14 | 1 | Clayton Jimmie | South Africa | 48.22 | |
| 27 | 15 | 3 | Nikita Konovalov | Russia | 48.23 | |
| 28 | 13 | 5 | Ryan Pini | Papua New Guinea | 48.24 | |
| 29 | 14 | 7 | Radovan Siljevski | Serbia | 48.35 | |
| 30 | 14 | 2 | Daniel Carranza | Mexico | 48.38 | |
| 31 | 15 | 8 | Marco di Carli | Germany | 48.42 | |
| 32 | 13 | 6 | Roy-Allan Burch | Bermuda | 48.56 | |
| 33 | 14 | 4 | Pjotr Degtjarjov | Estonia | 48.63 | |
| 34 | 14 | 3 | David Gamburg | Israel | 48.65 | |
| 35 | 16 | 0 | Yu Hexin | China | 48.69 | |
| 35 | 17 | 9 | Ivan Levaj | Croatia | 48.69 | |
| 37 | 14 | 5 | Frederik Pedersen | Denmark | 48.79 | |
| 38 | 13 | 3 | Matias Aguilera | Argentina | 48.93 | |
| 39 | 13 | 4 | Marius Radu | Romania | 48.99 | |
| 40 | 13 | 7 | Julien Henx | Luxembourg | 49.28 | |
| 41 | 13 | 0 | Povilas Strazdas | Lithuania | 49.33 | |
| 42 | 15 | 9 | Nazim Belkhodja | Algeria | 49.37 | |
| 43 | 12 | 4 | Wang Yu-lian | Chinese Taipei | 49.51 | |
| 44 | 13 | 9 | Bogdan Plavin | Ukraine | 49.65 | |
| 45 | 13 | 8 | Charles Hockin | Paraguay | 49.66 | |
| 46 | 10 | 5 | Oliver Elliot | Chile | 49.67 | |
| 47 | 11 | 8 | Matthew Abeysinghe | Sri Lanka | 49.75 | |
| 48 | 12 | 1 | Hüseyin Sakçı | Turkey | 49.76 | |
| 49 | 12 | 6 | Khurshidjon Tursunov | Uzbekistan | 50.06 | |
| 50 | 11 | 2 | Stanislav Karnaukhov | Kyrgyzstan | 50.26 | |
| 51 | 10 | 8 | Matthew Zammit | Malta | 50.31 | |
| 51 | 11 | 4 | Henri Reinsalu | Estonia | 50.31 | |
| 53 | 11 | 5 | Riku Poytakivi | Finland | 50.37 | |
| 54 | 12 | 5 | Ng Chun Nam Derick | Hong Kong | 50.48 | |
| 55 | 11 | 1 | Jevon Atkinson | Jamaica | 50.57 | |
| 56 | 12 | 0 | Mikel Schreuders | Aruba | 50.58 | |
| 57 | 9 | 6 | Nico Campbell | Jamaica | 50.65 | |
| 58 | 9 | 1 | Winter Heaven | Samoa | 50.67 | |
| 59 | 10 | 4 | Abdoul Niane | Senegal | 50.69 | |
| 60 | 10 | 6 | Mathieu Marquet | Mauritius | 50.73 | |
| 60 | 12 | 7 | Chang Kuo-chi | Chinese Taipei | 50.73 | |
| 62 | 9 | 0 | Peter Wetzlar | Zimbabwe | 50.78 | |
| 63 | 12 | 3 | Khader Baqlah | Jordan | 50.83 | |
| 64 | 11 | 6 | Kristofer Sigurðsson | Iceland | 50.93 | |
| 64 | 12 | 9 | Irakli Revishvili | Georgia | 50.93 | |
| 66 | 12 | 8 | Daniil Tulupov | Uzbekistan | 50.94 | |
| 66 | 13 | 2 | Renzo Tjon-A-Joe | Suriname | 50.94 | |
| 68 | 12 | 2 | Zuhayr Pigot | Suriname | 50.97 | |
| 69 | 11 | 7 | Mohammed Madouh | Kuwait | 51.00 | |
| 70 | 9 | 2 | Raoul Stafrace | Malta | 51.09 | |
| 71 | 9 | 5 | Rodrigo Suriano | El Salvador | 51.10 | |
| 72 | 9 | 8 | Ivan Andrianov | Azerbaijan | 51.22 | |
| 73 | 10 | 2 | Isaac Beitia | Panama | 51.28 | |
| 74 | 10 | 3 | Matias Pinto | Chile | 51.29 | |
| 75 | 11 | 0 | Sooud Al-Tayyar | Kuwait | 51.40 | |
| 76 | 11 | 9 | Kevin Avila Soto | Guatemala | 51.53 | |
| 77 | 10 | 9 | Jeremy Kostons | Curaçao | 51.68 | |
| 78 | 10 | 7 | Arnel Dudić | Bosnia and Herzegovina | 51.76 | |
| 79 | 8 | 7 | Galvez Capriles | Dominican Republic | 51.83 | |
| 80 | 8 | 1 | Meli Malani | Fiji | 52.01 | |
| 81 | 14 | 0 | Bradley Vincent | Mauritius | 52.02 | |
| 82 | 11 | 0 | Chad Idensohn | Zimbabwe | 52.07 | |
| 83 | 9 | 0 | Vahan Mkhitaryan | Armenia | 52.13 | |
| 84 | 8 | 0 | Farhan Saleh | Bahrain | 52.22 | |
| 85 | 6 | 0 | Stanford Kawale | Papua New Guinea | 52.45 | |
| 86 | 9 | 0 | Axel Ngui | Philippines | 52.50 | |
| 87 | 8 | 0 | Cherantha de Silva | Sri Lanka | 52.58 | |
| 88 | 10 | 0 | Alexandre Bakhtiarov | Cyprus | 52.61 | |
| 89 | 5 | 0 | Abel Fazekas | Azerbaijan | 52.63 | |
| 90 | 6 | 0 | Noah Mascoll-Gomes | Antigua and Barbuda | 52.65 | |
| 90 | 8 | 0 | Mahmoud Daaboul | Lebanon | 52.65 | |
| 92 | 6 | 0 | Patrick Groters | Aruba | 52.66 | |
| 93 | 8 | 0 | David van der Colff | Botswana | 52.67 | |
| 94 | 7 | 0 | Jim Sanderson | Gibraltar | 52.70 | |
| 94 | 7 | 0 | Aldo Castillo | Bolivia | 52.70 | |
| 96 | 7 | 0 | Rafael Sta | Philippines | 52.95 | |
| 97 | 9 | 0 | Gavin Lewis | Thailand | 53.16 | |
| 98 | 7 | 0 | Faraj Saleh | Bahrain | 53.20 | |
| 99 | 7 | 0 | Mark Burnley | Curaçao | 53.54 | |
| 100 | 10 | 0 | Maksim Bakharev | Kyrgyzstan | 53.59 | |
| 101 | 7 | 0 | Omar Hesham | Qatar | 53.62 | |
| 102 | 6 | 0 | Jesús Monge | Peru | 53.71 | |
| 103 | 8 | 0 | Adam Allouche | Lebanon | 53.81 | |
| 104 | 7 | 0 | Alex Sobers | Barbados | 53.86 | |
| 105 | 7 | 0 | Dulguun Batsaikhan | Mongolia | 54.10 | |
| 106 | 5 | 0 | Cristian Santi | San Marino | 54.26 | |
| 107 | 8 | 0 | Christian Nikles | Brunei | 54.27 | |
| 108 | 6 | 0 | Zandanbal Gunsennorov | Mongolia | 54.49 | |
| 109 | 4 | 2 | Kitso Matija | Botswana | 54.52 | |
| 110 | 5 | 4 | González Leonardo | Honduras | 54.58 | |
| 111 | 6 | 7 | Dean Hoffman | Seychelles | 54.72 | |
| 112 | 6 | 6 | Christopher Duenas | Guam | 54.74 | |
| 113 | 8 | 0 | Miguel Mena | Nicaragua | 54.79 | |
| 114 | 4 | 7 | Giordan Harris | Marshall Islands | 54.84 | |
| 115 | 7 | 8 | Franci Aleksi | Albania | 55.17 | |
| 116 | 3 | 5 | Valdo Laurenco | Mozambique | 55.20 | |
| 117 | 5 | 5 | Gianluca Pasolini | San Marino | 55.52 | |
| 118 | 6 | 5 | Ahmed Atari | Qatar | 55.55 | |
| 119 | 4 | 3 | Andrew Hopkin | Grenada | 55.57 | |
| 120 | 5 | 9 | J'Air Smith | Antigua and Barbuda | 55.60 | |
| 121 | 4 | 6 | Matthew Shone | Zambia | 55.03 | |
| 122 | 5 | 8 | Nikolas Sylvester | Saint Vincent and the Grenadines | 55.95 | |
| 122 | 6 | 3 | Guillermo López | Nicaragua | 55.95 | |
| 124 | 4 | 5 | Ahmed Al-Mutairy | Iraq | 56.10 | |
| 125 | 5 | 7 | Syed Javaid | Pakistan | 56.21 | |
| 126 | 6 | 0 | Brandon Schuster | Samoa | 56.38 | |
| 127 | 3 | 3 | Ibrahim Nishwan | Maldives | 56.81 | |
| 128 | 5 | 2 | Rony Bakale | Republic of the Congo | 56.85 | |
| 129 | 4 | 4 | Karl Pardo | Gibraltar | 57.03 | |
| 130 | 3 | 4 | Sirish Gurung | Nepal | 57.15 | |
| 130 | 3 | 6 | Tanner Poppe | Guam | 57.15 | |
| 132 | 4 | 0 | Temaruata Strickland | Cook Islands | 57.71 | |
| 133 | 5 | 1 | Mamadou Soumaré | Mali | 57.93 | |
| 134 | 5 | 0 | Kwesi Jackson | Ghana | 58.16 | |
| 134 | 2 | 3 | Adam Moncherry | Seychelles | 58.22 | |
| 136 | 2 | 4 | Tongli Panuve | Tonga | 58.46 | |
| 137 | 3 | 0 | Dionisio Augustine | Federated States of Micronesia | 58.59 | |
| 138 | 2 | 6 | Miraj Prajapati | Nepal | 58.64 | |
| 139 | 3 | 8 | Shawn Dingilius | Palau | 59.05 | |
| 140 | 4 | 1 | Aleksander Ngresi | Albania | 59.26 | |
| 141 | 4 | 9 | Omar Adams | Guyana | 59.33 | |
| 142 | 2 | 5 | Takumi Sugie | Northern Mariana Islands | 59.38 | |
| 143 | 3 | 2 | Umarkhon Alizoda | Tajikistan | 59.90 | |
| 144 | 3 | 1 | Aliasger Karimjee | Tanzania | 59.98 | |
| 145 | 3 | 9 | Storm Hablich | Saint Vincent and the Grenadines | 1:00.81 | |
| 146 | 2 | 0 | Christian Villacrusis | Northern Mariana Islands | 1:00.88 | |
| 147 | 3 | 7 | Billy-Scott Irakoze | Burundi | 1:01.54 | |
| 148 | 2 | 7 | Phathana Inthavong | Laos | 1:01.66 | |
| 149 | 2 | 1 | Idriss Mutankabandi | Burundi | 1:03.60 | |
| 150 | 2 | 8 | Andrew Fowler | Guyana | 1:04.48 | |
| 151 | 1 | 4 | Faridun Navruzov | Tajikistan | 1:05.33 | |
| 152 | 1 | 3 | Rayane Alognisso | Benin | 1:14.67 | |
| — | 1 | 5 | Jynior Ndinga | Republic of the Congo | | DNS |
| — | 2 | 2 | Apostolos Christou | Greece | | DNS |
| — | 4 | 8 | Atta Atta | Ivory Coast | | DNS |
| — | 7 | 3 | Ahmed Al-Hosani | United Arab Emirates | | DNS |
| — | 8 | 3 | Kitiphat Popimnan | Thailand | | DNS |
| — | 9 | 4 | Marcelo Acosta | El Salvador | | DNS |
| — | 16 | 7 | Dominik Kozma | Hungary | | DNS |
| — | 16 | 9 | Ari-Pekka Liukkonen | Finland | | DNS |
| — | 17 | 1 | Luca Leonardi | Italy | | DNS |
| — | 17 | 7 | Steffen Deibler | Germany | | DNS |

=== Semifinals ===
The semifinals were held at 18:30.

==== Semifinal 1 ====
| Rank | Lane | Name | Nationality | Time | Notes |
|---|---|---|---|---|---|
| 1 | 4 | João de Lucca | Brazil | 46.29 | Q |
| 2 | 5 | Cameron McEvoy | Australia | 46.68 | Q |
| 3 | 3 | Pieter Timmers | Belgium | 46.82 | Q |
| 4 | 6 | Katsumi Nakamura | Japan | 47.11 | |
| 5 | 7 | Luca Dotto | Italy | 47.26 | |
| 6 | 2 | Jimmy Feigen | United States | 47.44 | |
| 7 | 1 | Hanser García | Cuba | 47.59 | |
| 8 | 8 | Conor Dwyer | United States | 48.16 | |

==== Semifinal 2 ====
| Rank | Lane | Name | Nationality | Time | Notes |
|---|---|---|---|---|---|
| 1 | 4 | César Cielo | Brazil | 46.21 | Q |
| 2 | 2 | Florent Manaudou | France | 46.37 | Q |
| 3 | 5 | Tommaso D'Orsogna | Australia | 46.40 | Q |
| 4 | 3 | Danila Izotov | Russia | 46.45 | Q |
| 5 | 7 | Shinri Shioura | Japan | 46.70 | Q, AS |
| 6 | 6 | Mehdy Metella | France | 47.08 | |
| 7 | 1 | Leith Shankland | South Africa | 47.46 | |
| 8 | 8 | Brett Fraser | Cayman Islands | 48.00 | |

=== Final ===
The final was held at 18:06.

| Rank | Lane | Name | Nationality | Time | Notes |
|---|---|---|---|---|---|
| 1st place, gold medalist(s) | 4 | César Cielo | Brazil | 45.75 | |
| 2nd place, silver medalist(s) | 3 | Florent Manaudou | France | 45.81 | |
| 3rd place, bronze medalist(s) | 2 | Danila Izotov | Russia | 46.09 | |
| 4 | 6 | Tommaso D'Orsogna | Australia | 46.13 | |
| 5 | 7 | Cameron McEvoy | Australia | 46.66 | |
| 6 | 8 | Pieter Timmers | Belgium | 46.90 | |
| 7 | 5 | João de Lucca | Brazil | 47.05 | |
| 8 | 1 | Shinri Shioura | Japan | 47.38 | |
