= Soft tennis at the 2014 Asian Games =

- Venue: Yeorumul Tennis Courts
- Dates: 29 September – 4 October 2014
- Competitors: 87 from 13 nations

Soft tennis at the 2014 Asian Games was held in Incheon, South Korea from September 29 to October 4, 2014. All events were held at the Yeorumul Tennis Courts.

Soft tennis had team, doubles and singles events for men and women, as well as a mixed doubles competition.

== Schedule ==
P	Preliminary round	¼	Quarterfinals	½	Semifinals	F	Final

Event↓/Date →	29th Mon	30th Tue				1st Wed				2nd Thu				3rd Fri	4th Sat	
Men's singles	P	P	¼	½	F											
Men's doubles										P	¼	½	F			
Men's team														P	½	F
Women's singles	P	P	¼	½	F											
Women's doubles										P	¼	½	F			
Women's team														P	½	F
Mixed doubles						P	¼	½	F							

== Medalists ==
Event	Gold	Silver	Bronze
Men's singles	Kim Hyeong-jun; South Korea	Edi Kusdaryanto; Indonesia	Kim Dong-hoon; South Korea
Men's singles	Kim Hyeong-jun; South Korea	Edi Kusdaryanto; Indonesia	Zhou Mo; China
Men's doubles	South Korea; Kim Dong-hoon; Kim Beom-jun	Chinese Taipei; Lin Ting-chun; Li Chia-hung	South Korea; Lee Sang-gwon; Park Kyu-cheol
Men's doubles	South Korea; Kim Dong-hoon; Kim Beom-jun	Chinese Taipei; Lin Ting-chun; Li Chia-hung	Chinese Taipei; Ho Meng-hsun; Lai Li-huang
Men's team	South Korea; Kim Beom-jun; Kim Dong-hoon; Kim Hyeong-jun; Lee Sang-gwon; Park Kyu-cheol	Japan; Takuya Katsura; Koji Kobayashi; Koichi Nagae; Keiya Nakamoto; Hidenori Shinohara	Chinese Taipei; Ho Meng-hsun; Lai Li-huang; Li Chia-hung; Lin Ting-chun; Lin Yu-tse
Men's team	South Korea; Kim Beom-jun; Kim Dong-hoon; Kim Hyeong-jun; Lee Sang-gwon; Park Kyu-cheol	Japan; Takuya Katsura; Koji Kobayashi; Koichi Nagae; Keiya Nakamoto; Hidenori Shinohara	China; Li Ze; Lin Chengwei; Shi Xiaolin; Zhang Yusheng; Zhou Mo
Women's singles	Kim Bo-mi; South Korea	Chen Hui; China	Kim Ae-kyung; South Korea
Women's singles	Kim Bo-mi; South Korea	Chen Hui; China	Zhong Yi; China
Women's doubles	South Korea; Joo Og; Kim Ae-kyung	South Korea; Yoon Soo-jung; Kim Ji-yeon	Japan; Nao Morita; Hikaru Yamashita
Women's doubles	South Korea; Joo Og; Kim Ae-kyung	South Korea; Yoon Soo-jung; Kim Ji-yeon	Chinese Taipei; Cheng Chu-ling; Chen Yi-chia
Women's team	South Korea; Joo Og; Kim Ae-kyung; Kim Bo-mi; Kim Ji-yeon; Yoon Soo-jung	Japan; Nao Kobayashi; Kana Morihara; Nao Morita; Ayaka Oba; Hikaru Yamashita	Chinese Taipei; Chan Chia-hsin; Chen Yi-chia; Cheng Chu-ling; Chiang Wan-chi; Kuo Chien-chi
Women's team	South Korea; Joo Og; Kim Ae-kyung; Kim Bo-mi; Kim Ji-yeon; Yoon Soo-jung	Japan; Nao Kobayashi; Kana Morihara; Nao Morita; Ayaka Oba; Hikaru Yamashita	China; Chen Hui; Feng Zixuan; Liu Ge; Xin Yani; Zhong Yi
Mixed doubles	South Korea; Kim Beom-jun; Kim Ae-kyung	China; Zhou Mo; Chen Hui	South Korea; Park Kyu-cheol; Kim Ji-yeon
Mixed doubles	South Korea; Kim Beom-jun; Kim Ae-kyung	China; Zhou Mo; Chen Hui	Indonesia; Prima Simpatiaji; Maya Rosa

== Medal table ==
Rank	Nation	Gold	Silver	Bronze	Total
1	South Korea (KOR)	7	1	4	12
2	China (CHN)	0	2	4	6
3	Japan (JPN)	0	2	1	3
4	Chinese Taipei (TPE)	0	1	4	5
5	Indonesia (INA)	0	1	1	2
Totals (5 entries)		7	7	14	28

== Participating nations ==
A total of 87 athletes from 13 nations competed in soft tennis at the 2014 Asian Games:

- Cambodia (3)
- China (10)
- Chinese Taipei (10)
- Indonesia (7)
- Japan (10)
- Laos (7)
- Mongolia (10)
- Nepal (10)
- Philippines (3)
- South Korea (10)
- Tajikistan (2)
- Thailand (1)
- Vietnam (4)
