= Abdourahman Osman =

Djiboutian swimmer

Personal information
- Born: December 7, 1993 (age 32) Tadjoura, Djibouti

Sport
- Sport: Swimming

Abdourahman Osman (born 7 December 1993) is a Djiboutian swimmer specializing in freestyle. He competed in the 50 m event at the 2012 Summer Olympics.
