= Süleýman Ataýew =

Turkmenistani swimmer (born 1996)

Personal information
- Born: 1996 (age 29–30)

Sport
- Sport: Swimming
- Strokes: Freestyle

Suleyman Atayev (born 1996) is a Turkmenistani swimmer.

== International Career ==
=== 2012 FINA World Swimming Championships (25 m) ===
Suleyman represented Turkmenistan at the 2012 FINA World Swimming Championships (25 m), where he competed in the 50m freestyle and ranked 117. He could not advance.

=== 2013 World Aquatics Championships ===
Suleyman represented Turkmenistan at the 2013 World Aquatics Championships, where he competed in the 50 metre freestyle (ranked 75), 100 metre freestyle, and 200 metre freestyle (ranked 67) events. He could not advance and lost to Azerbaijani swimmer Suleyman Ismayilzade.
