= Paul Edingue Ekane =

Cameroonian swimmer

Personal information
- Born: September 23, 1990 (age 35)

Sport
- Sport: Swimming

Paul Edingue Ekane (born 23 September 1990) is a Cameroonian swimmer specializing in freestyle. He competed in the 50 m event at the 2012 Summer Olympics. He placed sixth in his heat and thus did not qualify for the semi-finals of the event. Ekane is one of seven Cameroonian athletes who disappeared from the Olympic Village during the Olympics, sparking speculation that they would attempt to defect to the United Kingdom.
