= Wilfried Tevoedjre =

Beninese swimmer

Personal information
- National team: Benin
- Born: 20 September 1979 (age 46) Cotonou, Benin

Sport
- Sport: Swimming
- Strokes: Freestyle Swimming

Wilfried Tevoedjre (born 20 September 1979) is a Beninese swimmer specializing in freestyle. He competed in the 50 m event at the 2012 Summer Olympics and in the 50m event at the 2013 World Aquatics Championships.
