= Maya Rosa =

Indonesian tennis player

- Full name: Maya Rosa Ariana Stefanie
- Country (sports): Indonesia
- Residence: Wonosobo, Indonesia
- Born: 17 August 1986 (age 40) Wonosobo
- Height: 1.62 m (5 ft 4 in)
- Turned pro: 2003
- Plays: Right-handed
- Prize money: $5,709

Singles
- Career record: 12–19
- Career titles: 0
- Highest ranking: No. 788 (26 April 2004)

Doubles
- Career record: 31–19
- Career titles: 2 ITF
- Highest ranking: No. 450 (3 May 2004)
Medal record
Southeast Asian Games
Gold medal – first place	2003 Ho Chi Minh City	Women's doubles
Silver medal – second place	2003 Ho Chi Minh City	Women's team
Silver medal – second place	2003 Ho Chi Minh City	Mixed doubles
Gold medal – first place	2011 Palembang	Soft Tennis Women's doubles
Gold medal – first place	2011 Palembang	Soft Tennis Women's team
Silver medal – second place	2011 Palembang	Soft Tennis Mixed doubles
Asian Games
Bronze medal – third place	2014 Incheon	Soft Tennis Mixed doubles

Maya Rosa Ariana Stefanie (born 17 August 1986) better known as Maya Rosa, is an Indonesian former tennis player. She made her debut as a professional in 2003, aged 16, at an ITF tournament in Jakarta. In that year, she won gold in the women's doubles, silver in the women's team, and silver in the mixed doubles at the Southeast Asian Games in Ho Chi Minh City.

In her first year of professional competition, she won two ITF doubles titles, at Jakarta and Manila.

Her most recent ITF Circuit match was played in 2006.

In 2011, she returned to international competition in a different sport, Soft Tennis. At the 2011 Southeast Asian Games in Palembang, she won two gold medals for Women's doubles and Women's team, and one silver medal for Mixed doubles. Along with partner Prima Simpatiaji, she won the mixed doubles bronze medal in Soft Tennis at the 2014 Asian Games in Incheon.

== ITF finals ==
=== Doubles (2–1) ===
Legend
$25,000 tournaments
$10,000 tournaments

Outcome	No.	Date	Tournament	Surface	Partner	Opponent	Score
Winner	1.	5 October 2003	Jakarta, Indonesia	Hard	(Indonesia) Septi Mende	(Thailand) Wilawan Choptang (India) Shruti Dhawan	7–6^{(6)}, 6–4
Winner	2.	16 November 2003	Manila, Philippines	Hard	(Indonesia) Wynne Prakusya	(South Korea) Kim Eun-ha (South Korea) Kim Ji-young	2–6, 6–0, 6–4
Runner-up	3.	3 May 2005	Tarakan, Indonesia	Hard (i)	(Indonesia) Eny Sulistyowati	(Indonesia) Wynne Prakusya (Indonesia) Romana Tedjakusuma	5–7, 2–6
