= Soft tennis at the 2002 Asian Games – Mixed doubles =

Mixed doubles at the 2002 Asian Games
- Venue: Sajik Tennis Courts
- Dates: 7 October 2002
- Competitors: 24 from 6 nations

Medalists
gold medal	You Young-dong; Kim Seo-woon	South Korea
silver medal	Fang Tung-hsien; Chou Chiu-ping	Chinese Taipei
bronze medal	Kim Hee-soo; Park Young-hee	South Korea

The mixed doubles soft tennis event was part of the soft tennis programme and took place on October 7, at the Sajik Tennis Courts.

== Schedule ==
All times are Korea Standard Time (UTC+09:00)

Date	Time	Event
Monday, 7 October 2002	08:00	Preliminary round
Monday, 7 October 2002	10:10	Quarterfinals
Monday, 7 October 2002	11:30	Semifinals
Monday, 7 October 2002	12:20	3rd–6th finals
Monday, 7 October 2002	15:40	Final

== Results ==
=== Preliminary round ===
==== Group A ====
Pos	Team	Pld	W	L	GF	GA	GD	Qualification
1	Zhang Zhuo (CHN) Zhao Ying (CHN)	2	2	0	10	4	+6	Quarterfinals
2	Kim Hee-soo (KOR) Park Young-hee (KOR)	2	1	1	9	5	+4	Quarterfinals
3	Richmond Paguyo (PHI) Josephine Paguyo (PHI)	2	0	2	0	10	−10	

Source: Report

	Score		Game								
	Score		1	2	3	4	5	6	7	8	9
Kim Hee-soo (KOR); Park Young-hee (KOR)	4–5	Zhang Zhuo (CHN); Zhao Ying (CHN)	4–0	2–4	6–4	4–2	2–4	1–4	4–2	0–4	3–7
Kim Hee-soo (KOR); Park Young-hee (KOR)	5–0	Richmond Paguyo (PHI); Josephine Paguyo (PHI)	4–0	4–2	5–3	5–3	4–0				
Zhang Zhuo (CHN); Zhao Ying (CHN)	5–0	Richmond Paguyo (PHI); Josephine Paguyo (PHI)	4–1	4–1	5–3	5–3	4–0				

==== Group B ====
Pos	Team	Pld	W	L	GF	GA	GD	Qualification
1	You Young-dong (KOR) Kim Seo-woon (KOR)	2	2	0	10	2	+8	Quarterfinals
2	Ren Changsheng (CHN) Wang Fang (CHN)	2	1	1	7	5	+2	Quarterfinals
3	Radnaabazaryn Bayartogtokh (MGL) Borbaataryn Enkhmaa (MGL)	2	0	2	0	10	−10	

Source: Report

	Score		Game								
	Score		1	2	3	4	5	6	7	8	9
Ren Changsheng (CHN); Wang Fang (CHN)	2–5	You Young-dong (KOR); Kim Seo-woon (KOR)	4–0	3–5	1–4	3–5	4–1	0–4	3–5		
Ren Changsheng (CHN); Wang Fang (CHN)	5–0	Radnaabazaryn Bayartogtokh (MGL); Borbaataryn Enkhmaa (MGL)	4–2	4–2	5–3	4–0	4–0				
You Young-dong (KOR); Kim Seo-woon (KOR)	5–0	Radnaabazaryn Bayartogtokh (MGL); Borbaataryn Enkhmaa (MGL)	4–1	4–0	4–2	4–1	4–2				

==== Group C ====
Pos	Team	Pld	W	L	GF	GA	GD	Qualification
1	Tsuneo Takagawa (JPN) Harumi Gyokusen (JPN)	2	2	0	10	5	+5	Quarterfinals
2	Tsai Ho-tsen (TPE) Chiang Wan-chi (TPE)	2	1	1	7	6	+1	Quarterfinals
3	Wenifredo de Leon (PHI) Petrona Bantay (PHI)	2	0	2	4	10	−6	

Source: Report

	Score		Game								
	Score		1	2	3	4	5	6	7	8	9
Tsuneo Takagawa (JPN); Harumi Gyokusen (JPN)	5–2	Tsai Ho-tsen (TPE); Chiang Wan-chi (TPE)	4–0	3–5	4–0	4–1	4–2	2–4	6–4		
Tsuneo Takagawa (JPN); Harumi Gyokusen (JPN)	5–3	Wenifredo de Leon (PHI); Petrona Bantay (PHI)	2–4	4–1	1–4	1–4	5–3	4–1	4–2	6–4	
Tsai Ho-tsen (TPE); Chiang Wan-chi (TPE)	5–1	Wenifredo de Leon (PHI); Petrona Bantay (PHI)	7–5	4–1	4–1	5–3	4–6	5–3			

==== Group D ====
Pos	Team	Pld	W	L	GF	GA	GD	Qualification
1	Fang Tung-hsien (TPE) Chou Chiu-ping (TPE)	2	2	0	10	4	+6	Quarterfinals
2	Shuji Komine (JPN) Miwa Tsuji (JPN)	2	1	1	7	7	0	Quarterfinals
3	Yondongiin Khuyagbaatar (MGL) Nyangaryn Gerelmaa (MGL)	2	0	2	4	10	−6	

Source: Report

	Score		Game								
	Score		1	2	3	4	5	6	7	8	9
Fang Tung-hsien (TPE); Chou Chiu-ping (TPE)	5–2	Shuji Komine (JPN); Miwa Tsuji (JPN)	4–2	0–4	5–3	1–4	4–2	7–5	8–6		
Fang Tung-hsien (TPE); Chou Chiu-ping (TPE)	5–2	Yondongiin Khuyagbaatar (MGL); Nyangaryn Gerelmaa (MGL)	2–4	4–1	1–4	5–3	4–0	4–2	4–2		
Shuji Komine (JPN); Miwa Tsuji (JPN)	5–2	Yondongiin Khuyagbaatar (MGL); Nyangaryn Gerelmaa (MGL)	4–1	4–2	4–2	1–4	4–0	2–4	4–2		

=== Final round ===
Quarterfinals
A1	Zhang Zhuo (CHN); Zhao Ying (CHN)	4	4	4	4	2	1	5
C2	Tsai Ho-tsen (TPE); Chiang Wan-chi (TPE)	0	0	2	0	4	4	3
B2	Ren Changsheng (CHN); Wang Fang (CHN)	2	2	4	4	2	3	2
D1	Fang Tung-hsien (TPE); Chou Chiu-ping (TPE)	4	4	2	2	4	5	4
C1	Tsuneo Takagawa (JPN); Harumi Gyokusen (JPN)	2	4	0	4	5	1	2	5
A2	Kim Hee-soo (KOR); Park Young-hee (KOR)	4	2	4	0	3	4	4	7
D2	Shuji Komine (JPN); Miwa Tsuji (JPN)	4	5	8	6	4	2	2	4	2
B1	You Young-dong (KOR); Kim Seo-woon (KOR)	2	3	10	8	0	4	4	1	7

Semifinals
A1	Zhang Zhuo (CHN); Zhao Ying (CHN)	3	4	4	10	2	2	1	1
D1	Fang Tung-hsien (TPE); Chou Chiu-ping (TPE)	5	1	1	8	4	4	4	4
A2	Kim Hee-soo (KOR); Park Young-hee (KOR)	0	7	2	4	1	2
B1	You Young-dong (KOR); Kim Seo-woon (KOR)	4	5	4	6	4	4

Final
D1	Fang Tung-hsien (TPE); Chou Chiu-ping (TPE)	0	3	3	2	4	0
B1	You Young-dong (KOR); Kim Seo-woon (KOR)	4	5	5	4	2	4
3rd–4th place
A1	Zhang Zhuo (CHN); Zhao Ying (CHN)	2	7	1	3	2
A2	Kim Hee-soo (KOR); Park Young-hee (KOR)	4	9	4	5	4

Round for 5th–6th									5th–6th place
C2	Tsai Ho-tsen (TPE); Chiang Wan-chi (TPE)	2	1	2	4	2	5	3
B2	Ren Changsheng (CHN); Wang Fang (CHN)	4	4	4	0	4	3	5	B2	Ren Changsheng (CHN); Wang Fang (CHN)	4	1	2	0	3
C1	Tsuneo Takagawa (JPN); Harumi Gyokusen (JPN)	5	5	6	5	6	4		C1	Tsuneo Takagawa (JPN); Harumi Gyokusen (JPN)	6	4	4	4	5
D2	Shuji Komine (JPN); Miwa Tsuji (JPN)	3	3	4	7	4	2
