= Soft tennis at the 2002 Asian Games – Men's team =

Men's team at the 2002 Asian Games
- Venue: Sajik Tennis Courts
- Dates: 1–3 October 2002
- Competitors: 24 from 5 nations

Medalists
gold medal	South Korea; Hwang Jeong-hwan, Kim Hee-soo, Kim Kyung-han, Lee Won-hak, You Young-dong
silver medal	Japan; Shuji Komine, Yasuhito Mitsuishi, Shigeo Nakahori, Tsuneo Takagawa, Hikotsugu Watanabe
bronze medal	Chinese Taipei; Fang Tung-hsien, Kuo Hsu-tung, Liao Nan-kai, Liu Chia-lun, Tsai Ho-tsen

The men's team soft tennis event was part of the soft tennis programme and took place between October 1 and 3, at the Sajik Tennis Courts.

== Schedule ==
All times are Korea Standard Time (UTC+09:00)

Date	Time	Event
Tuesday, 1 October 2002	10:00	Round 1
Tuesday, 1 October 2002	14:00	Round 2
Wednesday, 2 October 2002	10:00	Round 3
Wednesday, 2 October 2002	14:00	Round 4
Thursday, 3 October 2002	10:00	Round 5

== Results ==
Pos	Team	Pld	W	L	MF	MA	MD
1	South Korea	4	4	0	12	1	+11
2	Japan	4	3	1	9	5	+4
3	Chinese Taipei	4	2	2	7	6	+1
4	China	4	1	3	5	9	−4
5	Mongolia	4	0	4	0	12	−12

Source: Report

1 October	South Korea	3–0	Mongolia

Hwang Jeong-hwan / Kim Hee-soo	5–1	Radnaabazaryn Bayartogtokh / Bayarbilegiin Batzorig	4–1, 3–5, 4–2, 4–1, 4–0, 4–0
Kim Kyung-han	4–0	Düürenbayaryn Bayartsogt	4–1, 7–5, 4–0, 4–1
Lee Won-hak / You Young-dong	5–1	Yondongiin Khuyagbaatar / Dügeriin Bat-Erdene	4–0, 1–4, 5–3, 4–0, 5–3, 4–2

1 October	Chinese Taipei	3–0	China

Kuo Hsu-tung / Fang Tung-hsien	5–1	Zhang Zhuo / Ren Changsheng	3–5, 4–2, 4–0, 4–0, 4–1, 4–0
Liu Chia-lun	4–3	Zhang Zhuo	2–4, 1–4, 6–4, 1–4, 4–2, 4–2, 8–6
Liao Nan-kai / Tsai Ho-tsen	5–0	Huo Rui / Zhao Yang	4–1, 4–1, 5–3, 6–4, 4–0

1 October	Japan	3–0	Mongolia

Yasuhito Mitsuishi / Hikotsugu Watanabe	5–0	Radnaabazaryn Bayartogtokh / Dügeriin Bat-Erdene	5–3, 4–0, 4–2, 4–0, 4–1
Shuji Komine	4–0	Radnaabazaryn Bayartogtokh	4–2, 4–1, 4–2, 6–4
Shigeo Nakahori / Tsuneo Takagawa	5–0	Yondongiin Khuyagbaatar / Bayarbilegiin Batzorig	4–0, 5–3, 4–2, 4–0, 4–2

1 October	South Korea	3–1	China

Lee Won-hak / Kim Hee-soo	1–5	Zhang Zhuo / Ren Changsheng	2–4, 2–4, 4–0, 2–4, 6–8, 1–4
Kim Kyung-han	4–0	Zhao Yang	4–0, 4–1, 4–0, 5–3
Hwang Jeong-hwan / You Young-dong	5–0	Huo Rui / Zhao Yang	4–0, 4–2, 4–2, 4–1, 4–1
Kim Hee-soo	4–0	Zhang Zhuo	4–1, 4–0, 4–0, 4–1

2 October	Chinese Taipei	1–3	Japan

Liao Nan-kai / Fang Tung-hsien	2–5	Shigeo Nakahori / Tsuneo Takagawa	4–6, 2–4, 2–4, 4–0, 5–3, 2–4, 3–5
Liu Chia-lun	4–3	Shuji Komine	2–4, 2–4, 4–0, 4–2, 3–5, 4–2, 7–2
Kuo Hsu-tung / Tsai Ho-tsen	4–5	Yasuhito Mitsuishi / Hikotsugu Watanabe	2–4, 2–4, 3–5, 4–2, 0–4, 4–2, 4–1, 4–1, 4–7
Liao Nan-kai	3–4	Tsuneo Takagawa	6–4, 2–4, 4–1, 7–9, 2–4, 4–1, 1–7

2 October	China	3–0	Mongolia

Zhang Zhuo / Ren Changsheng	5–1	Yondongiin Khuyagbaatar / Dügeriin Bat-Erdene	4–1, 4–2, 2–4, 5–3, 4–2, 4–2
Zhang Zhuo	4–0	Radnaabazaryn Bayartogtokh	4–2, 4–1, 4–1, 4–0
Huo Rui / Zhao Yang	5–1	Radnaabazaryn Bayartogtokh / Bayarbilegiin Batzorig	4–0, 6–4, 0–4, 4–2, 4–0, 4–2

2 October	South Korea	3–0	Japan

Lee Won-hak / You Young-dong	5–1	Shigeo Nakahori / Tsuneo Takagawa	4–0, 1–4, 5–3, 6–4, 4–1, 4–1
Kim Kyung-han	4–0	Shuji Komine	4–1, 4–2, 5–3, 5–3
Hwang Jeong-hwan / Kim Hee-soo	5–4	Yasuhito Mitsuishi / Hikotsugu Watanabe	4–1, 4–2, 6–4, 4–6, 2–4, 1–4, 1–4, 4–2, 7–2

2 October	Chinese Taipei	3–0	Mongolia

Kuo Hsu-tung / Tsai Ho-tsen	5–0	Radnaabazaryn Bayartogtokh / Dügeriin Bat-Erdene	4–2, 4–0, 4–1, 4–2, 4–0
Liu Chia-lun	4–0	Düürenbayaryn Bayartsogt	4–1, 4–0, 4–2, 4–2
Liao Nan-kai / Fang Tung-hsien	5–0	Düürenbayaryn Bayartsogt / Bayarbilegiin Batzorig	4–2, 4–0, 4–2, 4–2, 4–1

3 October	Japan	3–1	China

Shigeo Nakahori / Tsuneo Takagawa	5–0	Huo Rui / Zhao Yang	4–2, 5–3, 4–2, 4–1, 4–2
Shuji Komine	4–0	Zhang Zhuo	7–5, 4–1, 5–3, 4–1
Yasuhito Mitsuishi / Hikotsugu Watanabe	2–5	Zhang Zhuo / Ren Changsheng	2–4, 7–9, 4–2, 9–7, 2–4, 3–5, 3–5
Shigeo Nakahori	4–1	Zhao Yang	4–1, 3–5, 4–2, 4–0, 4–0

3 October	South Korea	3–0	Chinese Taipei

Lee Won-hak / You Young-dong	5–2	Liao Nan-kai / Fang Tung-hsien	4–0, 2–4, 4–2, 4–2, 4–1, 3–5, 4–1
Kim Kyung-han	4–2	Liu Chia-lun	4–2, 4–2, 4–1, 3–5, 3–5, 4–0
Hwang Jeong-hwan / Kim Hee-soo	5–1	Kuo Hsu-tung / Tsai Ho-tsen	4–0, 1–4, 4–2, 4–1, 4–2, 4–1
