= Soft tennis at the 2002 Asian Games =

- Venue: Sajik Tennis Courts
- Dates: 1–7 October 2002
- Competitors: 54 from 7 nations

Soft tennis was a discipline of the tennis competitions at the 2002 Asian Games. Competition took place from October 1 to October 7. All events were held at Sajik Tennis Courts. The host nation South Korea dominated the competition by winning all seven gold medals.

== Schedule ==
●	Round	●	Last round	P	Preliminary round	¼	Quarterfinals	½	Semifinals	B	Bronze medal match	G	Gold medal match

Event↓/Date →	1st Tue	2nd Wed	3rd Thu	4th Fri				5th Sat				6th Sun	7th Mon				
Men's singles								P	¼	½	B		G				
Men's doubles				P	¼	½	B						G				
Men's team	●	●	●														
Women's singles								P	¼	½	B		G				
Women's doubles				P	¼	½	B						G				
Women's team	●	●	●														
Mixed doubles													P	¼	½	B	G

== Medalists ==
Event	Gold	Silver	Bronze
Men's singles	Kim Kyung-han; South Korea	Kim Hee-soo; South Korea	Liao Nan-kai; Chinese Taipei
Men's doubles	South Korea; Lee Won-hak; You Young-dong	South Korea; Hwang Jeong-hwan; Kim Hee-soo	Chinese Taipei; Liao Nan-kai; Tsai Ho-tsen
Men's team	South Korea; Hwang Jeong-hwan; Kim Hee-soo; Kim Kyung-han; Lee Won-hak; You Young-dong	Japan; Shuji Komine; Yasuhito Mitsuishi; Shigeo Nakahori; Tsuneo Takagawa; Hikotsugu Watanabe	Chinese Taipei; Fang Tung-hsien; Kuo Hsu-tung; Liao Nan-kai; Liu Chia-lun; Tsai Ho-tsen
Women's singles	Park Young-hee; South Korea	Kim Hyun-ju; South Korea	Zhao Ying; China
Women's doubles	South Korea; Kim Seo-woon; Jang Mi-hwa	Japan; Shino Mizukami; Shiho Yatagai	South Korea; Park Young-hee; Kim Myung-hee
Women's team	South Korea; Jang Mi-hwa; Kim Hyun-ju; Kim Myung-hee; Kim Seo-woon; Park Young-hee	Japan; Harumi Gyokusen; Shino Mizukami; Miwa Tsuji; Ayumi Ueshima; Shiho Yatagai	Chinese Taipei; Chang Fang-tzu; Chiang Wan-chi; Chou Chiu-ping; Lan Yi-yun; Wang Shi-ting
Mixed doubles	South Korea; You Young-dong; Kim Seo-woon	Chinese Taipei; Fang Tung-hsien; Chou Chiu-ping	South Korea; Kim Hee-soo; Park Young-hee

== Medal table ==
Rank	Nation	Gold	Silver	Bronze	Total
1	South Korea (KOR)	7	3	2	12
2	Japan (JPN)	0	3	0	3
3	Chinese Taipei (TPE)	0	1	4	5
4	China (CHN)	0	0	1	1
Totals (4 entries)		7	7	7	21

== Participating nations ==
A total of 54 athletes from 7 nations competed in soft tennis at the 2002 Asian Games:

- China (8)
- Chinese Taipei (10)
- Japan (10)
- Mongolia (10)
- Nepal (2)
- Philippines (4)
- South Korea (10)
