= Soft tennis at the 2002 Asian Games – Women's singles =

Women's singles at the 2002 Asian Games
- Venue: Sajik Tennis Courts
- Dates: 5–7 October 2002
- Competitors: 10 from 5 nations

Medalists
| gold medal | Park Young-hee | South Korea |
| silver medal | Kim Hyun-ju | South Korea |
| bronze medal | Zhao Ying | China |

The women's singles soft tennis event was part of the soft tennis programme and took place between October 5 and 7, at the Sajik Tennis Courts.

== Schedule ==
All times are Korea Standard Time (UTC+09:00)

| Date | Time | Event |
|---|---|---|
| Saturday, 5 October 2002 | 09:00 | Preliminary round |
| Saturday, 5 October 2002 | 14:10 | Quarterfinals |
| Saturday, 5 October 2002 | 15:20 | Semifinals |
| Saturday, 5 October 2002 | 16:30 | 3rd–6th finals |
| Monday, 7 October 2002 | 13:00 | Final |

== Results ==
=== Preliminary round ===
==== Group A ====
| Pos | Athlete | Pld | W | L | GF | GA | GD | Qualification |
|---|---|---|---|---|---|---|---|---|
| 1 | Park Young-hee (KOR) | 2 | 2 | 0 | 8 | 0 | +8 | Semifinals |
| 2 | Wang Fang (CHN) | 2 | 1 | 1 | 4 | 4 | 0 | Quarterfinals |
| 3 | Saruulyn Urantegsh (MGL) | 2 | 0 | 2 | 0 | 8 | −8 | |

Source: Report

| | Score | | Game | | | | | | |
| | Score | | 1 | 2 | 3 | 4 | 5 | 6 | 7 |
|---|---|---|---|---|---|---|---|---|---|
| Park Young-hee (KOR) | 4–0 | Wang Fang (CHN) | 4–1 | 4–2 | 4–2 | 4–1 | | | |
| Park Young-hee (KOR) | 4–0 | Saruulyn Urantegsh (MGL) | 4–0 | 4–1 | 4–0 | 4–0 | | | |
| Wang Fang (CHN) | 4–0 | Saruulyn Urantegsh (MGL) | 4–1 | 4–0 | 4–0 | 4–0 | | | |

==== Group B ====
| Pos | Athlete | Pld | W | L | GF | GA | GD | Qualification |
|---|---|---|---|---|---|---|---|---|
| 1 | Shino Mizukami (JPN) | 2 | 2 | 0 | 8 | 2 | +6 | Semifinals |
| 2 | Zhao Ying (CHN) | 2 | 1 | 1 | 6 | 5 | +1 | Quarterfinals |
| 3 | Chiang Wan-chi (TPE) | 2 | 0 | 2 | 1 | 8 | −7 | |

Source: Report

| | Score | | Game | | | | | | |
| | Score | | 1 | 2 | 3 | 4 | 5 | 6 | 7 |
|---|---|---|---|---|---|---|---|---|---|
| Shino Mizukami (JPN) | 4–2 | Zhao Ying (CHN) | 4–2 | 1–4 | 4–6 | 4–0 | 4–1 | 4–0 | |
| Shino Mizukami (JPN) | 4–0 | Chiang Wan-chi (TPE) | 5–3 | 4–2 | 4–2 | 6–4 | | | |
| Zhao Ying (CHN) | 4–1 | Chiang Wan-chi (TPE) | 4–1 | 4–0 | 2–4 | 4–1 | 4–0 | | |

==== Group C ====
| Pos | Athlete | Pld | W | L | GF | GA | GD | Qualification |
|---|---|---|---|---|---|---|---|---|
| 1 | Kim Hyun-ju (KOR) | 3 | 3 | 0 | 12 | 5 | +7 | Quarterfinals |
| 2 | Wang Shi-ting (TPE) | 3 | 2 | 1 | 11 | 4 | +7 | Quarterfinals |
| 3 | Miwa Tsuji (JPN) | 3 | 1 | 2 | 6 | 8 | −2 | |
| 4 | Nyangaryn Gerelmaa (MGL) | 3 | 0 | 3 | 0 | 12 | −12 | |

Source: Report

| | Score | | Game | | | | | | |
| | Score | | 1 | 2 | 3 | 4 | 5 | 6 | 7 |
|---|---|---|---|---|---|---|---|---|---|
| Wang Shi-ting (TPE) | 3–4 | Kim Hyun-ju (KOR) | 4–2 | 4–2 | 5–3 | 2–4 | 0–4 | 3–5 | 4–7 |
| Miwa Tsuji (JPN) | 4–0 | Nyangaryn Gerelmaa (MGL) | 4–1 | 4–1 | 4–0 | 4–0 | | | |
| Wang Shi-ting (TPE) | 4–0 | Miwa Tsuji (JPN) | 8–6 | 6–4 | 4–1 | 4–2 | | | |
| Kim Hyun-ju (KOR) | 4–0 | Nyangaryn Gerelmaa (MGL) | 4–1 | 5–3 | 4–2 | 4–1 | | | |
| Wang Shi-ting (TPE) | 4–0 | Nyangaryn Gerelmaa (MGL) | 4–0 | 4–1 | 4–2 | 4–1 | | | |
| Kim Hyun-ju (KOR) | 4–2 | Miwa Tsuji (JPN) | 4–6 | 4–1 | 8–6 | 3–5 | 4–2 | 4–2 | |

=== Final round ===
Quarterfinals
C2 | Wang Shi-ting (TPE) | 2 | 4 | 4 | 4 | 0 | 1 | 5
B2 | Zhao Ying (CHN) | 4 | 0 | 2 | 1 | 4 | 4 | 7
C1 | Kim Hyun-ju (KOR) | 1 | 4 | 4 | 4 | 4
A2 | Wang Fang (CHN) | 4 | 2 | 2 | 2 | 0

Semifinals
A1 | Park Young-hee (KOR) | 4 | 7 | 4 | 4
B2 | Zhao Ying (CHN) | 2 | 5 | 0 | 0
C1 | Kim Hyun-ju (KOR) | 4 | 4 | 5 | 4
B1 | Shino Mizukami (JPN) | 0 | 1 | 3 | 2

Final
A1 | Park Young-hee (KOR) | 0 | 0 | 4 | 5 | 3 | 5 | 8
C1 | Kim Hyun-ju (KOR) | 4 | 4 | 2 | 3 | 5 | 3 | 6
3rd–4th place
B2 | Zhao Ying (CHN) | 4 | 4 | 4 | 4
B1 | Shino Mizukami (JPN) | 0 | 2 | 2 | 1

| 5th–6th place |
| C2 | Wang Shi-ting (TPE) | 3 | 4 | 1 | 4 | 4 | 4 |
| A2 | Wang Fang (CHN) | 5 | 2 | 4 | 0 | 1 | 2 |
