= Soft tennis at the 2002 Asian Games – Women's doubles =

Women's doubles at the 2002 Asian Games
- Venue: Sajik Tennis Courts
- Dates: 4–7 October 2002
- Competitors: 22 from 6 nations

Medalists
gold medal	Kim Seo-woon; Jang Mi-hwa	South Korea
silver medal	Shino Mizukami; Shiho Yatagai	Japan
bronze medal	Park Young-hee; Kim Myung-hee	South Korea

The women's doubles soft tennis event was part of the soft tennis programme and took place between October 4 and 7, at the Sajik Tennis Courts.

== Schedule ==
All times are Korea Standard Time (UTC+09:00)

Date	Time	Event
Friday, 4 October 2002	09:00	Preliminary round
Friday, 4 October 2002	14:10	Quarterfinals
Friday, 4 October 2002	15:20	Semifinals
Friday, 4 October 2002	16:30	3rd–6th finals
Monday, 7 October 2002	14:20	Final

== Results ==
=== Preliminary round ===
==== Group A ====
Pos	Team	Pld	W	L	GF	GA	GD	Qualification
1	Harumi Gyokusen (JPN) Ayumi Ueshima (JPN)	2	2	0	10	2	+8	Semifinals
2	Chang Fang-tzu (TPE) Lan Yi-yun (TPE)	2	1	1	7	7	0	Quarterfinals
3	Wang Fang (CHN) Zhao Ying (CHN)	2	0	2	2	10	−8	

Source: Report

	Score		Game								
	Score		1	2	3	4	5	6	7	8	9
Harumi Gyokusen (JPN); Ayumi Ueshima (JPN)	5–2	Chang Fang-tzu (TPE); Lan Yi-yun (TPE)	4–2	2–4	4–1	4–2	3–5	5–3	4–2		
Harumi Gyokusen (JPN); Ayumi Ueshima (JPN)	5–0	Wang Fang (CHN); Zhao Ying (CHN)	4–0	4–2	4–2	4–2	5–3				
Chang Fang-tzu (TPE); Lan Yi-yun (TPE)	5–2	Wang Fang (CHN); Zhao Ying (CHN)	4–1	4–0	1–4	4–2	7–5	3–5	4–2		

==== Group B ====
Pos	Team	Pld	W	L	GF	GA	GD	Qualification
1	Park Young-hee (KOR) Kim Myung-hee (KOR)	3	3	0	15	2	+13	Semifinals
2	Chou Chiu-ping (TPE) Wang Shi-ting (TPE)	3	2	1	12	6	+6	Quarterfinals
3	Josephine Paguyo (PHI) Petrona Bantay (PHI)	3	1	2	6	10	−4	
4	Lkhagvajavyn Narantsetseg (MGL) Borbaataryn Enkhmaa (MGL)	3	0	3	0	15	−15	

Source: Report

	Score		Game								
	Score		1	2	3	4	5	6	7	8	9
Chou Chiu-ping (TPE); Wang Shi-ting (TPE)	2–5	Park Young-hee (KOR); Kim Myung-hee (KOR)	1–4	2–4	2–4	0–4	4–1	5–3	0–4		
Josephine Paguyo (PHI); Petrona Bantay (PHI)	5–0	Lkhagvajavyn Narantsetseg (MGL); Borbaataryn Enkhmaa (MGL)	4–0	5–3	5–3	4–0	5–3				
Chou Chiu-ping (TPE); Wang Shi-ting (TPE)	5–1	Josephine Paguyo (PHI); Petrona Bantay (PHI)	4–1	0–4	4–0	6–4	4–2	4–1			
Park Young-hee (KOR); Kim Myung-hee (KOR)	5–0	Lkhagvajavyn Narantsetseg (MGL); Borbaataryn Enkhmaa (MGL)	4–0	7–5	4–1	4–2	4–2				
Chou Chiu-ping (TPE); Wang Shi-ting (TPE)	5–0	Lkhagvajavyn Narantsetseg (MGL); Borbaataryn Enkhmaa (MGL)	4–1	4–0	4–1	4–0	4–1				
Park Young-hee (KOR); Kim Myung-hee (KOR)	5–0	Josephine Paguyo (PHI); Petrona Bantay (PHI)	4–0	4–2	4–0	4–1	4–1				

==== Group C ====
Pos	Team	Pld	W	L	GF	GA	GD	Qualification
1	Shino Mizukami (JPN) Shiho Yatagai (JPN)	3	3	0	15	2	+13	Quarterfinals
2	Kim Seo-woon (KOR) Jang Mi-hwa (KOR)	3	2	1	11	5	+6	Quarterfinals
3	Jiang Ting (CHN) Dai Tingting (CHN)	3	1	2	6	10	−4	
4	Saruulyn Urantegsh (MGL) Tsogtgereliin Uranchimeg (MGL)	3	0	3	0	15	−15	

Source: Report

	Score		Game								
	Score		1	2	3	4	5	6	7	8	9
Kim Seo-woon (KOR); Jang Mi-hwa (KOR)	1–5	Shino Mizukami (JPN); Shiho Yatagai (JPN)	4–1	2–4	1–4	3–5	0–4	1–4			
Saruulyn Urantegsh (MGL); Tsogtgereliin Uranchimeg (MGL)	0–5	Jiang Ting (CHN); Dai Tingting (CHN)	0–4	1–4	1–4	2–4	2–4				
Kim Seo-woon (KOR); Jang Mi-hwa (KOR)	5–0	Saruulyn Urantegsh (MGL); Tsogtgereliin Uranchimeg (MGL)	4–0	7–5	4–0	4–0	4–1				
Shino Mizukami (JPN); Shiho Yatagai (JPN)	5–1	Jiang Ting (CHN); Dai Tingting (CHN)	1–4	5–3	4–2	5–3	4–0	5–3			
Kim Seo-woon (KOR); Jang Mi-hwa (KOR)	5–0	Jiang Ting (CHN); Dai Tingting (CHN)	7–5	4–0	4–2	4–2	4–2				
Shino Mizukami (JPN); Shiho Yatagai (JPN)	5–0	Saruulyn Urantegsh (MGL); Tsogtgereliin Uranchimeg (MGL)	4–0	4–0	4–1	4–1	4–0				

=== Final round ===
Quarterfinals
C2	Kim Seo-woon (KOR); Jang Mi-hwa (KOR)	3	6	5	4	4	3	8
B2	Chou Chiu-ping (TPE); Wang Shi-ting (TPE)	5	4	3	2	1	5	6
C1	Shino Mizukami (JPN); Shiho Yatagai (JPN)	4	5	7	6	2	4
A2	Chang Fang-tzu (TPE); Lan Yi-yun (TPE)	2	3	5	4	4	0

Semifinals
A1	Harumi Gyokusen (JPN); Ayumi Ueshima (JPN)	4	4	5	6	3	0	2
C2	Kim Seo-woon (KOR); Jang Mi-hwa (KOR)	0	6	7	4	5	4	4
C1	Shino Mizukami (JPN); Shiho Yatagai (JPN)	0	0	4	4	4	3	4	6
B1	Park Young-hee (KOR); Kim Myung-hee (KOR)	4	4	2	1	2	5	2	4

Final
C2	Kim Seo-woon (KOR); Jang Mi-hwa (KOR)	0	4	4	5	4	4
C1	Shino Mizukami (JPN); Shiho Yatagai (JPN)	4	0	0	3	1	2
3rd–4th place
A1	Harumi Gyokusen (JPN); Ayumi Ueshima (JPN)	1	0	4	4	0	1	5	4	6
B1	Park Young-hee (KOR); Kim Myung-hee (KOR)	4	4	2	2	4	4	3	0	8

5th–6th place
B2	Chou Chiu-ping (TPE); Wang Shi-ting (TPE)	2	0	2	6	2	2
A2	Chang Fang-tzu (TPE); Lan Yi-yun (TPE)	4	4	4	4	4	4
