= Soft tennis at the 2002 Asian Games – Women's team =

Woman's Soft Tennis Event

Women's team at the 2002 Asian Games
- Venue: Sajik Tennis Courts
- Dates: 1–3 October 2002
- Competitors: 24 from 5 nations

Medalists
gold medal	South Korea; Jang Mi-hwa, Kim Hyun-ju, Kim Myung-hee, Kim Seo-woon, Park Young-hee
silver medal	Japan; Harumi Gyokusen, Shino Mizukami, Miwa Tsuji, Ayumi Ueshima, Shiho Yatagai
bronze medal	Chinese Taipei; Chang Fang-tzu, Chiang Wan-chi, Chou Chiu-ping, Lan Yi-yun, Wang Shi-ting

The women's team soft tennis event was part of the soft tennis programme and took place between October 1 and 3, at the Sajik Tennis Courts.

== Schedule ==
All times are Korea Standard Time (UTC+09:00)

Date	Time	Event
Tuesday, 1 October 2002	10:00	Round 1
Tuesday, 1 October 2002	14:00	Round 2
Wednesday, 2 October 2002	10:00	Round 3
Wednesday, 2 October 2002	14:00	Round 4
Thursday, 3 October 2002	10:00	Round 5

== Results ==
Pos	Team	Pld	W	L	MF	MA	MD
1	South Korea	4	4	0	12	1	+11
2	Japan	4	3	1	9	6	+3
3	Chinese Taipei	4	2	2	9	7	+2
4	China	4	1	3	5	9	−4
5	Mongolia	4	0	4	0	12	−12

Source: Report

1 October	South Korea	3–0	Mongolia

Kim Hyun-ju / Kim Myung-hee	5–0	Lkhagvajavyn Narantsetseg / Borbaataryn Enkhmaa	4–1, 4–1, 4–0, 4–1, 4–0
Park Young-hee	4–0	Nyangaryn Gerelmaa	4–1, 4–1, 4–1, 4–0
Kim Seo-woon / Jang Mi-hwa	5–0	Saruulyn Urantegsh / Tsogtgereliin Uranchimeg	4–0, 4–1, 4–2, 4–0, 4–1

1 October	Japan	3–1	China

Miwa Tsuji / Shiho Yatagai	4–5	Wang Fang / Zhao Ying	4–2, 4–0, 5–3, 0–4, 4–0, 3–5, 2–4, 5–7, 12–14
Shino Mizukami	4–3	Zhao Ying	1–4, 1–4, 5–7, 4–2, 6–4, 4–1, 7–3
Harumi Gyokusen / Ayumi Ueshima	5–3	Jiang Ting / Dai Tingting	4–2, 3–5, 4–0, 4–1, 6–4, 1–4, 2–4, 4–2
Miwa Tsuji	4–2	Dai Tingting	2–4, 4–2, 4–2, 2–4, 4–0, 4–2

1 October	Chinese Taipei	3–0	Mongolia

Chou Chiu-ping / Wang Shi-ting	5–1	Lkhagvajavyn Narantsetseg / Borbaataryn Enkhmaa	4–0, 4–1, 2–4, 4–1, 4–1, 4–0
Chiang Wan-chi	4–1	Nyangaryn Gerelmaa	4–1, 4–2, 2–4, 4–1, 4–1
Chang Fang-tzu / Lan Yi-yun	5–0	Tsogtgereliin Uranchimeg / Saruulyn Urantegsh	4–0, 4–1, 5–3, 4–1, 4–0

1 October	South Korea	3–0	China

Park Young-hee / Kim Myung-hee	5–2	Wang Fang / Zhao Ying	4–1, 4–2, 2–4, 5–3, 4–6, 4–0, 4–2
Kim Hyun-ju	4–0	Zhao Ying	4–1, 4–1, 7–5, 6–4
Kim Seo-woon / Jang Mi-hwa	5–0	Jiang Ting / Dai Tingting	4–2, 4–2, 6–4, 4–2, 7–5

2 October	Japan	3–2	Chinese Taipei

Miwa Tsuji / Shiho Yatagai	4–5	Chou Chiu-ping / Wang Shi-ting	4–1, 2–4, 6–4, 4–1, 2–4, 5–7, 2–4, 4–1, 3–7
Shino Mizukami	4–3	Wang Shi-ting	1–4, 4–0, 2–4, 4–2, 4–1, 2–4, 8–6
Harumi Gyokusen / Ayumi Ueshima	2–5	Chang Fang-tzu / Lan Yi-yun	4–0, 5–7, 3–5, 3–5, 2–4, 4–0, 1–4
Miwa Tsuji	4–3	Chiang Wan-chi	2–4, 4–2, 4–2, 3–5, 5–3, 6–8, 7–4
Shino Mizukami / Shiho Yatagai	5–1	Chou Chiu-ping / Chang Fang-tzu	4–1, 4–2, 4–1, 4–0, 2–4, 5–3

2 October	China	3–0	Mongolia

Wang Fang / Zhao Ying	5–0	Saruulyn Urantegsh / Nyangaryn Gerelmaa	4–1, 4–2, 4–0, 4–2, 4–1
Zhao Ying	4–0	Nyangaryn Gerelmaa	4–2, 4–0, 6–4, 4–1
Dai Tingting / Jiang Ting	5–0	Lkhagvajavyn Narantsetseg / Borbaataryn Enkhmaa	4–2, 4–1, 4–1, 4–1, 4–1

2 October	South Korea	3–1	Chinese Taipei

Park Young-hee / Kim Myung-hee	5–1	Chou Chiu-ping / Wang Shi-ting	4–1, 4–1, 4–6, 5–3, 8–6, 6–4
Kim Hyun-ju	0–4	Wang Shi-ting	1–4, 0–4, 1–4, 2–4
Kim Seo-woon / Jang Mi-hwa	5–2	Chang Fang-tzu / Lan Yi-yun	9–7, 2–4, 4–0, 4–2, 2–4, 5–3, 4–2
Park Young-hee	4–2	Chiang Wan-chi	4–1, 2–4, 4–1, 1–4, 4–2, 4–1

2 October	Japan	3–0	Mongolia

Harumi Gyokusen / Ayumi Ueshima	5–0	Lkhagvajavyn Narantsetseg / Borbaataryn Enkhmaa	4–0, 4–0, 4–0, 5–3, 4–0
Harumi Gyokusen	4–0	Nyangaryn Gerelmaa	4–0, 4–1, 4–2, 4–0
Miwa Tsuji / Shiho Yatagai	5–0	Tsogtgereliin Uranchimeg / Saruulyn Urantegsh	4–1, 4–1, 4–1, 4–0, 4–1

3 October	Chinese Taipei	3–1	China

Chang Fang-tzu / Lan Yi-yun	3–5	Zhao Ying / Wang Fang	4–1, 3–5, 2–4, 1–4, 5–3, 4–1, 2–4, 4–6
Wang Shi-ting	4–3	Zhao Ying	4–2, 4–2, 2–4, 1–4, 5–3, 1–4, 7–5
Chou Chiu-ping / Wang Shi-ting	5–0	Jiang Ting / Dai Tingting	4–0, 4–1, 4–2, 4–0, 4–0
Chiang Wan-chi	4–1	Dai Tingting	3–5, 5–3, 4–1, 11–9, 5–3

3 October	South Korea	3–0	Japan

Kim Seo-woon / Jang Mi-hwa	5–0	Shino Mizukami / Shiho Yatagai	6–4, 5–3, 4–2, 4–2, 4–0
Kim Hyun-ju	4–1	Miwa Tsuji	4–1, 4–1, 1–4, 4–2, 5–3
Park Young-hee / Kim Myung-hee	5–3	Harumi Gyokusen / Ayumi Ueshima	1–4, 4–0, 4–6, 5–3, 2–4, 4–0, 4–0, 5–3
