= List of Asian Games medalists in sailing =

This is the complete list of Asian Games medalists in sailing from 1970 to 2022.

== Men ==
=== Formula Kite ===
Games	Gold	Silver	Bronze
2022 Hangzhou	Max Maeder (SGP)	Zhang Haoran (CHN)	Joseph Weston (THA)

=== Division II ===
- Open to both genders

Games	Gold	Silver	Bronze
1986 Seoul	Qi Jianguo (CHN)	Saard Panyawan (THA)	Abdul Malik Faisal (INA)

=== iQFoil ===
Games	Gold	Silver	Bronze
2022 Hangzhou	Bi Kun (CHN)	Lee Tae-hoon (KOR)	Cheng Ching Yin (HKG)

=== Lechner A-390 ===
Games	Gold	Silver	Bronze
1990 Beijing	Jiang Chen (CHN)	Saard Panyawan (THA)	Suh Young-keun (KOR)

=== Mistral ===
Games	Gold	Silver	Bronze
1994 Hiroshima	Qian Hong (CHN)	Sam Wong (HKG)	Arun Homraruen (THA)
2010 Guangzhou	Chan King Yin (HKG)	Oka Sulaksana (INA)	Yao Fuwen (CHN)
2014 Incheon	Cheng Kwok Fai (HKG)	Natthaphong Phonoppharat (THA)	Shi Chuankun (CHN)

=== Mistral light ===
Games	Gold	Silver	Bronze
1998 Bangkok	Arun Homraruen (THA)	Ted Huang (TPE)	Li Mingdong (CHN)
2002 Busan	Zhou Yuanguo (CHN)	Arun Homraruen (THA)	Ikuo Inoue (JPN)
2006 Doha	Chan King Yin (HKG)	Zeng Xiaohong (CHN)	Arun Homraruen (THA)

=== Mistral heavy ===
Games	Gold	Silver	Bronze
1998 Bangkok	Oka Sulaksana (INA)	Motokazu Kenjo (JPN)	Kookiat Sakulfaeng (THA)
2002 Busan	Oka Sulaksana (INA)	Mo Zehai (CHN)	Motokazu Kenjo (JPN)
2006 Doha	Yao Xinhao (CHN)	Ho Chi Ho (HKG)	Oka Sulaksana (INA)

=== Raceboard light ===
Games	Gold	Silver	Bronze
1998 Bangkok	Zhou Yuanguo (CHN)	Sam Wong (HKG)	Ok Duck-pil (KOR)
2002 Busan	Ok Duck-pil (KOR)	Gao Chuanwei (CHN)	Chan King Yin (HKG)

=== Raceboard heavy ===
Games	Gold	Silver	Bronze
1998 Bangkok	Suhaimee Moohammadkasem (THA)	Chen Zhanying (CHN)	Hong A-ram (KOR)
2002 Busan	Sun Maochun (CHN)	Suhaimee Moohammadkasem (THA)	Hong A-ram (KOR)

=== RS:X ===
Games	Gold	Silver	Bronze
2010 Guangzhou	Wang Aichen (CHN)	Ek Boonsawad (THA)	Lee Tae-hoon (KOR)
2014 Incheon	Wang Aichen (CHN)	Andy Leung (HKG)	Ek Boonsawad (THA)
2018 Jakarta–Palembang	Bi Kun (CHN)	Michael Cheng (HKG)	Lee Tae-hoon (KOR)
2022 Hangzhou	Cho Won-woo (KOR)	Natthaphong Phonoppharat (THA)	Eabad Ali (IND)

=== Windglider ===
- Open to both genders

Games	Gold	Silver	Bronze
1982 New Delhi	Tsunemoto Ishiwata (JPN)	Policarpio Ortega (PHI)	Ken Choi (HKG)

=== Laser 4.7 ===
- From 2006 to 2018, Open to both genders

Games	Gold	Silver	Bronze
2006 Doha	Colin Cheng (SIN)	Waleed Al-Sharshani (QAT)	Nurul Elia Anuar (MAS)
2018 Jakarta–Palembang	Fauzi Kaman Shah (MAS)	Wang Jianxiong (CHN)	Harshita Tomar (IND)
2022 Hangzhou	Weka Bhanubandh (THA)	Isaac Goh (SGP)	Asnawi Iqbal Adam (MAS)

=== Laser Radial ===
- Open to both genders

Games	Gold	Silver	Bronze
2002 Busan	Shen Sheng (CHN)	Kim Jung-gon (KOR)	Rajesh Choudhary (IND)
2006 Doha	Xu Lijia (CHN)	Koh Seng Leong (SIN)	Rajesh Choudhary (IND)
2010 Guangzhou	Keerati Bualong (THA)	Hisaki Nagai (JPN)	Scott Glen Sydney (SIN)

=== Laser ===
- From 1986 to 1994, open to both genders

Games	Gold	Silver	Bronze
1986 Seoul	Park Kil-chul (KOR)	Koichiro Naito (JPN)	Ma Youming (CHN)
1990 Beijing	Park Kil-chul (KOR)	Cao Xiaobo (CHN)	Tomoyuki Sasaki (JPN)
1994 Hiroshima	Benedict Tan (SIN)	Jin Hong-chul (KOR)	Cao Xiaobo (CHN)
1998 Bangkok	Kim Ho-kon (KOR)	Kevin Lim (MAS)	Cao Xiaobo (CHN)
2002 Busan	Kim Ho-kon (KOR)	Kevin Lim (MAS)	Kunio Suzuki (JPN)
2006 Doha	Maximilian Soh (SIN)	Yoichi Iijima (JPN)	Kim Ho-kon (KOR)
2010 Guangzhou	Ha Jee-min (KOR)	Colin Cheng (SIN)	Chen Huichao (CHN)
2014 Incheon	Ha Jee-min (KOR)	Khairulnizam Afendy (MAS)	Colin Cheng (SIN)
2018 Jakarta–Palembang	Ha Jee-min (KOR)	Khairulnizam Afendy (MAS)	Ryan Lo (SGP)
2022 Hangzhou	Ryan Lo (SGP)	Ha Jee-min (KOR)	Vishnu Saravanan (IND)

=== OK ===
- Open to both genders

Games	Gold	Silver	Bronze
1970 Bangkok	Kazuoki Matsuyama (JPN)	Rachot Kanjanavanit (THA)	Khin Thein (BIR)
1978 Bangkok	Naoki Nagatsu (JPN)	Santi Thamasucharit (THA)	Tan Swee Hung (SIN)
1982 New Delhi	Khalid Akhtar (PAK)	Naoki Nagatsu (JPN)	C. S. Pradipak (IND)
1998 Bangkok	Jin Hong-chul (KOR)	Anthony Kiong (SIN)	Prasertsak Moolprasert (THA)
2002 Busan	Jin Hong-chul (KOR)	Nitin Mongia (IND)	Veerasit Puangnak (THA)

=== Optimist ===
- From 1986 to 1994, open to both genders

Games	Gold	Silver	Bronze
1986 Seoul	Park Jong-woo (KOR)	Daisuke Miyamoto (JPN)	Tosaporn Painupong (THA)
1990 Beijing	Kazuto Seki (JPN)	Choi Jung-yeon (KOR)	Thaweewat Ploypathom (THA)
1994 Hiroshima	Ryan Tan (MAS)	Tetsuya Matsunaga (JPN)	Arsalan Khan (PAK)
1998 Bangkok	Chae Bong-jin (KOR)	Mohd Nazmi Sharif (MAS)	Roy Tay (SIN)
2002 Busan	Shibuki Iitsuka (JPN)	Zhu Ye (CHN)	Teo Wee Chin (SIN)
2006 Doha	Ni Wei (CHN)	Navee Thamsoontorn (THA)	Sean Lee (SIN)
2010 Guangzhou	Zhang Xiaotian (CHN)	Ahmad Latif Khan (MAS)	Ryan Lo (SIN)
2014 Incheon	Park Sung-bin (KOR)	Raynn Kwok (SIN)	Suthon Yampinid (THA)

=== Super Moth ===
- Open to both genders

Games	Gold	Silver	Bronze
1970 Bangkok	Takao Otani (JPN)	Yeo See Teck (SIN)	Krirk Vanikkul (THA)
1978 Bangkok	Damrong Sirisakorn (THA)	Khin Thein (BIR)	Masaaki Ogura (JPN)
1998 Bangkok	Damrongsak Vongtim (THA)	Malik Sulaiman (MAS)	Zahid Rauf (PAK)

=== 420 ===
Games	Gold	Silver	Bronze
1998 Bangkok	Singapore (SIN); Siew Shaw Her; Colin Ng	South Korea (KOR); Park Jong-woo; Kim Hyeong-tae	Thailand (THA); Wiwat Poonpat; Kitipong Khambang
2002 Busan	South Korea (KOR); Lee Dong-woo; Park Jong-woo	Thailand (THA); Damrongsak Vongtim; Sittisak Musikul	China (CHN); Tang Mingfeng; Ma Zhicheng
2006 Doha	Singapore (SIN); Justin Liu; Sherman Cheng	Japan (JPN); Shibuki Iitsuka; Shingen Furuya	Myanmar (MYA); Nay La Kyaw; Min Min
2010 Guangzhou	Singapore (SIN); Justin Liu; Sherman Cheng	South Korea (KOR); Lee Sang-min; Yang Ho-yeob	Malaysia (MAS); Ku Anas Ku Zamil; Hafizzudin Mazelan
2014 Incheon	Malaysia (MAS); Faizal Norizan; Ahmad Syukri Abdul Aziz	Japan (JPN); Ibuki Koizumi; Kotaro Matsuo	Singapore (SIN); Loh Jia Yi; Jonathan Yeo

=== 470 ===
- In 1986, open to both genders

Games	Gold	Silver	Bronze
1986 Seoul	China (CHN); Lin Jiacheng; Chen Hongtai	India (IND); Farokh Tarapore; Dhruv Bhandari	Japan (JPN); Norio Ogasawara; Hiroyuki Kuriyama
1990 Beijing	Japan (JPN); Kenji Nakamura; Masayuki Takahashi	China (CHN); Zhang Yongqiang; Wang Yong	India (IND); Farokh Tarapore; Cyrus Cama
1994 Hiroshima	Japan (JPN); Kenji Nakamura; Masato Takaki	Singapore (SIN); Siew Shaw Her; Charles Lim	India (IND); Farokh Tarapore; Kelly Subbanand Rao
1998 Bangkok	South Korea (KOR); Kim Dae-young; Jung Sung-ahn	Japan (JPN); Eiichiro Hamazaki; Masato Takaki	Singapore (SIN); Tan Wearn Haw; Charles Lim
2002 Busan	South Korea (KOR); Jung Sung-ahn; Kim Dae-young	Japan (JPN); Kazuto Seki; Kenjiro Todoroki	Singapore (SIN); Tan Wearn Haw; Chung Pei Ming
2006 Doha	South Korea (KOR); Kim Dae-young; Jung Sung-ahn	Singapore (SIN); Xu Yuan Zhen; Terence Koh	Japan (JPN); Kan Yamada; Kenichi Nakamura
2010 Guangzhou	Japan (JPN); Ryunosuke Harada; Yugo Yoshida	China (CHN); Wang Weidong; Deng Daokun	South Korea (KOR); Kim Dae-young; Jung Sung-ahn
2014 Incheon	South Korea (KOR); Kim Chang-ju; Kim Ji-hoon	Japan (JPN); Kazuto Doi; Kimihiko Imamura	China (CHN); Lan Hao; Wang Chao
2018 Jakarta–Palembang	Japan (JPN); Tetsuya Isozaki; Akira Takayanagi	China (CHN); Wang Chao; Xu Zangjun	Thailand (THA); Navee Thamsoontorn; Nut Butmarasri

=== Enterprise ===
- Open to both genders

Games	Gold	Silver	Bronze
1970 Bangkok	Burma (BIR); Htoo Aung Gyi; Tun Kyi	Ceylon (CEY); Ray Wijewardene; Ekendra Edirisinghe	India (IND); Soli Contractor; Afsar Hussain
1978 Bangkok	Pakistan (PAK); Byram D. Avari; Munir Sadiq	India (IND); Surinder Mongia; Dharmendra Kumar	Thailand (THA); Vinai Vongtim; Boonrawd Maneenoparat
1982 New Delhi	Pakistan (PAK); Byram D. Avari; Goshpi Avari	India (IND); Jeejee Unwalla; Fali Unwalla	Japan (JPN); Hiroshi Inoue; Hideo Baba
1986 Seoul	Pakistan (PAK); Munir Sadiq; Muhammad Zakaullah	South Korea (KOR); Ahn Cheul-ung; Kim Seung-suk	Japan (JPN); Saburo Sato; Tatsuya Wakinaga
1990 Beijing	Pakistan (PAK); Munir Sadiq; Muhammad Zakaullah	Japan (JPN); Saburo Sato; Nobuhiro Utada	India (IND); Pushpendra Kumar Garg; Homi Motivala
1994 Hiroshima	Japan (JPN); Hiroshi Maeda; Takayuki Goto	Pakistan (PAK); Munir Sadiq; Mamoon Sadiq	India (IND); Homi Motivala; Pushpendra Kumar Garg
1998 Bangkok	South Korea (KOR); Chung Yoon-gil; Lim Jin-young	Pakistan (PAK); Mamoon Sadiq; Munir Sadiq	Sri Lanka (SRI); Lalin Jirasinha; Krishan Janaka
2002 Busan	South Korea (KOR); Jun Joo-hyun; Jung Kwon	Pakistan (PAK); Shehryar Arshad; Muhammad Riaz	India (IND); Aashim Mongia; Mahesh Ramchandran

=== Fireball ===
- Open to both genders

Games	Gold	Silver	Bronze
1970 Bangkok	Thailand (THA); Birabongse Bhanubandh; Arunee Bhanubandh	Singapore (SIN); David Low; James Tham	Burma (BIR); Tun Thein; Than Sein
1978 Bangkok	Japan (JPN); Shinichi Menjo; Shigeru Muto	Thailand (THA); Chamnong Sampanyoo; Panasarn Hasdin	Singapore (SIN); Tan Kok Wah; Lewis Liem
1982 New Delhi	India (IND); Farokh Tarapore; Zarir Karanjia	Japan (JPN); Nobuhiko Yagi; Toshio Tanaka	Thailand (THA); Panasarn Hasdin; Surapol Tippavongse

=== Flying Dutchman ===
- Open to both genders

Games	Gold	Silver	Bronze
1970 Bangkok	Japan (JPN); Akira Yamamura; Takashi Yamamura	Thailand (THA); Dawee Chullasapya; Suthep Indrakosoom	Indonesia (INA); John Gunawan; David Udjulawa

=== 49er ===
Games	Gold	Silver	Bronze
2018 Jakarta–Palembang	Japan (JPN); Shingen Furuya; Shinji Hachiyama	South Korea (KOR); Chae Bon-jin; Kim Dong-wook	India (IND); Varun Thakkar; K. C. Ganapathy
2022 Hangzhou	China (CHN); Wen Zaiding; Liu Tian	Oman (OMA); Musab Al-Hadi; Waleed Al-Kendi	Hong Kong (HKG); Akira Sakai; Russell Aylsworth

=== Hobie 16 ===
- Open to both genders

Games	Gold	Silver	Bronze
2006 Doha	Thailand (THA); Damrongsak Vongtim; Sakda Vongtim	South Korea (KOR); Park Kyu-tae; Sung Chang-il	Singapore (SIN); Melcolm Huang; Chung Pei Quan
2010 Guangzhou	Thailand (THA); Damrongsak Vongtim; Kitsada Vongtim	South Korea (KOR); Jun Joo-hyun; Jeong Gweon	Singapore (SIN); Teo Wee Chin; Justin Wong
2014 Incheon	South Korea (KOR); Kim Keun-soo; Song Min-jae	Thailand (THA); Damrongsak Vongtim; Kitsada Vongtim	Hong Kong (HKG); Tong Yui Shing; Tong Kit Fong

=== Match racing ===
- Beneteau First Class 7.5: 2006
- J/80: 2010–2014
- Open to both genders

Games	Gold	Silver	Bronze
2006 Doha	Singapore (SIN); Ivan Tan; Justin Wong; Renfred Tay; Teo Wee Chin; Roy Tay	India (IND); Sanjeev Chauhan; Girdhari Yadav; Nitin Mongia; Mahesh Ramchandran	South Korea (KOR); Yoon Cheul; Kim Tae-jung; Kim Hyeong-tae; Kim Sang-suk
2010 Guangzhou	Japan (JPN); Wataru Sakamoto; Daichi Wada; Yasuhiro Okamoto; Hiroaki Yoshifuji	India (IND); Farokh Tarapore; Balraj; Atool Sinha; Shekhar Singh Yadav; Balkrishna Helegaonkar	South Korea (KOR); Park Gun-woo; Lee Dong-woo; Kim Sung-wok; Cho Sung-min; Nam Yong-jin
2014 Incheon	Singapore (SIN); Maximilian Soh; Justin Wong; Andrew Paul Chan; Russell Kan; Christopher Lim	South Korea (KOR); Park Gun-woo; Cho Sung-min; Kim Sung-wok; Yang Ho-yeob; Chae Bong-jin	Japan (JPN); Wataru Sakamoto; Daichi Wada; Nobuyuki Imai; Yasuhiro Okamoto

== Women ==
=== Formula Kite ===
Games	Gold	Silver	Bronze
2022 Hangzhou	Chen Jingyue (CHN)	Benyapa Jantawan (THA)	Lee Young-eun (KOR)

=== iQFoil ===
Games	Gold	Silver	Bronze
2022 Hangzhou	Huang Xianting (CHN)	Ma Kwan Ching (HKG)	Aticha Homraruen (THA)

=== Lechner A-390 ===
Games	Gold	Silver	Bronze
1990 Beijing	Zhang Xiaodong (CHN)	Lee Lai Shan (HKG)	Joo Soon-ahn (KOR)

=== Mistral ===
Games	Gold	Silver	Bronze
1994 Hiroshima	Li Ke (CHN)	Lee Lai Shan (HKG)	Joo Soon-ahn (KOR)
1998 Bangkok	Lee Lai Shan (HKG)	Huang Ying (CHN)	Masako Imai (JPN)
2002 Busan	Lee Lai Shan (HKG)	Yin Jian (CHN)	Masako Imai (JPN)
2006 Doha	Chen Lina (CHN)	Chan Wai Kei (HKG)	Napalai Tansai (THA)
2010 Guangzhou	Wang Ning (CHN)	Hayley Chan (HKG)	Napalai Tansai (THA)

=== RS:One ===
Games	Gold	Silver	Bronze
2014 Incheon	Weng Qiaoshan (CHN)	Sonia Lo (HKG)	Siripon Kaewduang-ngam (THA)

=== RS:X ===
Games	Gold	Silver	Bronze
2010 Guangzhou	Sun Sasa (CHN)	Chan Wai Kei (HKG)	Sarocha Prumprai (THA)
2014 Incheon	Hayley Chan (HKG)	Sun Jiali (CHN)	Sarocha Prumprai (THA)
2018 Jakarta–Palembang	Chen Peina (CHN)	Hayley Chan (HKG)	Siripon Kaewduang-ngam (THA)
2022 Hangzhou	Siripon Kaewduang-ngam (THA)	Ngai Wai Yan (HKG)	Tengku Nuraini (MAS)

=== Europe ===
Games	Gold	Silver	Bronze
1998 Bangkok	Zhang Hong (CHN)	Aiko Saito (JPN)	Tracey Tan (SIN)
2002 Busan	Lu Chunfeng (CHN)	Maiko Sato (JPN)	Hong Jin-young (KOR)

=== Laser 4.7 ===
Games	Gold	Silver	Bronze
2022 Hangzhou	Noppasorn Khunboonjan (THA)	Neha Thakur (IND)	Keira Carlyle (SGP)

=== Laser Radial ===
Games	Gold	Silver	Bronze
2014 Incheon	Zhang Dongshuang (CHN)	Manami Doi (JPN)	Kamolwan Chanyim (THA)
2018 Jakarta–Palembang	Manami Doi (JPN)	Zhang Dongshuang (CHN)	Nur Shazrin Mohd Latif (MAS)
2022 Hangzhou	Nur Shazrin Mohd Latif (MAS)	Stephanie Norton (HKG)	Victoria Chan (SGP)

=== Optimist ===
Games	Gold	Silver	Bronze
1998 Bangkok	Kim Suk-kyong (KOR)	Shen Xiaoying (CHN)	Prapawadee Damdangdee (THA)
2002 Busan	Xu Lijia (CHN)	Yoko Kiuchi (JPN)	Sarah Tan (SIN)
2006 Doha	Rufina Tan (MAS)	Haruka Komiya (JPN)	Benjamas Poonpat (THA)
2010 Guangzhou	Noppakao Poonpat (THA)	Kimberly Lim (SIN)	Lu Yuting (CHN)
2014 Incheon	Jodie Lai (SIN)	Yu Huijia (CHN)	Kamonchanok Klahan (THA)

=== 420 ===
Games	Gold	Silver	Bronze
1998 Bangkok	Singapore (SIN); Joan Huang; Naomi Tan	Thailand (THA); Wandee Vongtim; Theeranoot Vongruck	Hong Kong (HKG); Mou Lap Kam; Lee Chun Yi
2002 Busan	China (CHN); Wang Yan; Song Xiaqun	South Korea (KOR); Kim Suk-kyong; Her Jung-eun	Singapore (SIN); Toh Liying; Joan Huang
2006 Doha	Singapore (SIN); Sarah Tan; Lim Tze Ting	Japan (JPN); Yumi Takahashi; Kae Tsugaya	Myanmar (MYA); Su Sandar Wai; Zin April Aung
2010 Guangzhou	Singapore (SIN); Rachel Lee; Cecilia Low	Malaysia (MAS); Khairunnisa Afendy; Norashikin Sayed	China (CHN); Wei Mengxi; Gao Haiyan
2014 Incheon	Singapore (SIN); Kimberly Lim; Savannah Siew	Malaysia (MAS); Nuraisyah Jamil; Umi Norwahida Sallahuddin	South Korea (KOR); Lee Na-kyung; Choi Seo-eun

=== 470 ===
Games	Gold	Silver	Bronze
1990 Beijing	Japan (JPN); Yoko Uo; Muneko Adachi	China (CHN); Liao Xiaoyan; Liu Meiyun	South Korea (KOR); Kim Hye-suk; Jung Eun-suk
1994 Hiroshima	China (CHN); Li Sumei; Chen Xiumei	Japan (JPN); Mieko Kasai; Chinatsu Ojima	Hong Kong (HKG); Cheung Mei Han; Cheung Pui Shan
1998 Bangkok	China (CHN); Yang Xiaoyan; Li Dongying	Japan (JPN); Chizuko Ijima; Makiko Ikuta	South Korea (KOR); Kim Myoung-hwa; Jung Eun-suk
2006 Doha	Japan (JPN); Ai Kondo; Naoko Kamata	Singapore (SIN); Toh Liying; Elizabeth Tan	China (CHN); Yu Chunyan; Wen Yimei
2010 Guangzhou	Japan (JPN); Ai Kondo; Wakako Tabata	China (CHN); Cai Liping; Gao Yang	Singapore (SIN); Dawn Liu; Siobhan Tam
2018 Jakarta–Palembang	Japan (JPN); Ai Yoshida; Miho Yoshioka	China (CHN); Wei Mengxi; Gao Haiyan	Malaysia (MAS); Nuraisyah Jamil; Norashikin Sayed

=== 29er ===
Games	Gold	Silver	Bronze
2014 Incheon	Thailand (THA); Noppakao Poonpat; Nichapa Waiwai	Singapore (SIN); Priscilla Low; Cecilia Low	India (IND); Varsha Gautham; Aishwarya Nedunchezhiyan

=== 49erFX ===
Games	Gold	Silver	Bronze
2018 Jakarta–Palembang	Singapore (SGP); Kimberly Lim; Cecilia Low	India (IND); Varsha Gautham; Sweta Shervegar	Thailand (THA); Nichapa Waiwai; Kamonchanok Klahan
2022 Hangzhou	China (CHN); Hu Xiaoyu; Shan Mengyuan	Japan (JPN); Misaki Tanaka; Sera Nagamatsu	Singapore (SGP); Kimberly Lim; Cecilia Low

== Mixed ==
=== RS:One ===
Games	Gold	Silver	Bronze
2018 Jakarta–Palembang	China (CHN); Chen Hao; Tan Yue	Hong Kong (HKG); Rafeek Kikabhoy; Ma Kwan Ching	Malaysia (MAS); Ilham Wahab; Nur Fatin Solehah

=== 470 ===
Games	Gold	Silver	Bronze
2022 Hangzhou	Japan (JPN); Keiju Okada; Miho Yoshioka	China (CHN); Dong Wenju; Wang Jingsa	South Korea (KOR); Kim Ji-a; Cho Sung-min

=== Nacra 17 ===
Games	Gold	Silver	Bronze
2022 Hangzhou	China (CHN); Zhao Huancheng; Wang Saibo	Singapore (SGP); Justin Liu; Denise Lim	Japan (JPN); Shibuki Iitsuka; Oura Nishida Capiglia
