= Sailing at the 2002 Asian Games =

- Venue: Busan Yachting Center
- Dates: 3–9 October 2002
- Competitors: 128 from 16 nations

Sailing was contested at the 2002 Asian Games from October 3 to October 9. Competition took place in various sailing disciplines at the Busan Yachting Center. 15 Gold medals were awarded in the various classes competing, from the Olympic 470 and Mistral to the Junior Optimist, in a regatta that saw very few of the eleven scheduled races not completed for all classes.

== Schedule ==
| ● | Round | ● | Last round |

| Event↓/Date → | 3rd Thu | 4th Fri | 5th Sat | 6th Sun | 7th Mon | 8th Tue | 9th Wed |
|---|---|---|---|---|---|---|---|
| Men's Mistral light | ●● | ● | ●●● | | ● | ●●● | ● |
| Men's Mistral heavy | ●● | ● | ●●● | | ● | ●●● | ● |
| Men's Raceboard light | ●● | ● | ●●● | | ●● | ●● | ● |
| Men's Raceboard heavy | ●● | ● | ●●● | | ● | ●● | ●● |
| Men's Laser | ●● | ● | ●●● | | ●● | ●● | ● |
| Boys' Optimist | ●● | ● | ●●● | | ●● | ● | ●● |
| Men's 420 | ●● | ● | ●●● | | ●● | ●● | ● |
| Men's 470 | ●● | ● | ●●● | | ●● | ●● | ● |
| Women's Mistral | ●● | ● | ●●● | | ●● | ●● | ● |
| Women's Europe | ●● | ● | ●●● | | ●● | ●● | ● |
| Girls' Optimist | ●● | ● | ●●● | | ●● | ● | ●● |
| Women's 420 | ●● | ● | ●●● | | ● | ●● | ●● |
| Open Laser Radial | ●● | ● | ●●● | | ●● | ●● | ● |
| Open OK | ●● | ● | ●●● | | ●● | ●● | ● |
| Open Enterprise | ●● | ● | ●●● | | ● | ●● | ●● |

== Medalists ==
=== Men ===
| Event | Gold | Silver | Bronze |
|---|---|---|---|
| Mistral light | Zhou Yuanguo; China | Arun Homraruen; Thailand | Ikuo Inoue; Japan |
| Mistral heavy | Oka Sulaksana; Indonesia | Mo Zehai; China | Motokazu Kenjo; Japan |
| Raceboard light | Ok Duck-pil; South Korea | Gao Chuanwei; China | Chan King Yin; Hong Kong |
| Raceboard heavy | Sun Maochun; China | Suhaimee Moohammadkasem; Thailand | Hong A-ram; South Korea |
| Laser | Kim Ho-kon; South Korea | Kevin Lim; Malaysia | Kunio Suzuki; Japan |
| Optimist | Shibuki Iitsuka; Japan | Zhu Ye; China | Teo Wee Chin; Singapore |
| 420 | South Korea; Lee Dong-woo; Park Jong-woo | Thailand; Damrongsak Vongtim; Sittisak Musikul | China; Tang Mingfeng; Ma Zhicheng |
| 470 | South Korea; Jung Sung-ahn; Kim Dae-young | Japan; Kazuto Seki; Kenjiro Todoroki | Singapore; Tan Wearn Haw; Chung Pei Ming |

=== Women ===
| Event | Gold | Silver | Bronze |
|---|---|---|---|
| Mistral | Lee Lai Shan; Hong Kong | Yin Jian; China | Masako Imai; Japan |
| Europe | Lu Chunfeng; China | Maiko Sato; Japan | Hong Jin-young; South Korea |
| Optimist | Xu Lijia; China | Yoko Kiuchi; Japan | Sarah Tan; Singapore |
| 420 | China; Wang Yan; Song Xiaqun | South Korea; Kim Suk-kyong; Her Jung-eun | Singapore; Toh Liying; Joan Huang |

=== Open ===
| Event | Gold | Silver | Bronze |
|---|---|---|---|
| Laser Radial | Shen Sheng; China | Kim Jung-gon; South Korea | Rajesh Choudhary; India |
| OK | Jin Hong-chul; South Korea | Nitin Mongia; India | Veerasit Puangnak; Thailand |
| Enterprise | South Korea; Jun Joo-hyun; Jung Kwon | Pakistan; Shehryar Arshad; Muhammad Riaz | India; Aashim Mongia; Mahesh Ramchandran |

== Medal table ==
| Rank | Nation | Gold | Silver | Bronze | Total |
|---|---|---|---|---|---|
| 1 | China (CHN) | 6 | 4 | 1 | 11 |
| 2 | South Korea (KOR) | 6 | 2 | 2 | 10 |
| 3 | Japan (JPN) | 1 | 3 | 4 | 8 |
| 4 | Hong Kong (HKG) | 1 | 0 | 1 | 2 |
| 5 | Indonesia (INA) | 1 | 0 | 0 | 1 |
| 6 | Thailand (THA) | 0 | 3 | 1 | 4 |
| 7 | India (IND) | 0 | 1 | 2 | 3 |
| 8 | Malaysia (MAS) | 0 | 1 | 0 | 1 |
| 8 | Pakistan (PAK) | 0 | 1 | 0 | 1 |
| 10 | Singapore (SIN) | 0 | 0 | 4 | 4 |
| Totals (10 entries) | | 15 | 15 | 15 | 45 |

== Participating nations ==
A total of 128 athletes from 16 nations competed in sailing at the 2002 Asian Games:

- China (16)
- Chinese Taipei (2)
- Hong Kong (7)
- India (11)
- Indonesia (2)
- Japan (11)
- Kuwait (4)
- Malaysia (8)
- Myanmar (8)
- Pakistan (8)
- Philippines (4)
- Qatar (3)
- Singapore (12)
- South Korea (19)
- Sri Lanka (2)
- Thailand (11)
