= Sailing at the 1998 Asian Games =

- Venue: Ao-dongtarn Jomtien Beach
- Dates: 8–13 December 1998
- Competitors: 122 from 16 nations

Sailing (as Yachting) was contested at the 1998 Asian Games from December 8 to December 13. Competition took place in various sailing disciplines at the Ao-dongtarn Jomtien Beach in Pattaya, Chonburi Province.

== Medalists ==
=== Men ===
Event	Gold	Silver	Bronze
Mistral light	Arun Homraruen; Thailand	Ted Huang; Chinese Taipei	Li Mingdong; China
Mistral heavy	Oka Sulaksana; Indonesia	Motokazu Kenjo; Japan	Kookiat Sakulfaeng; Thailand
Raceboard light	Zhou Yuanguo; China	Sam Wong; Hong Kong	Ok Duck-pil; South Korea
Raceboard heavy	Suhaimee Moohammadkasem; Thailand	Chen Zhanying; China	Hong A-ram; South Korea
Laser	Kim Ho-kon; South Korea	Kevin Lim; Malaysia	Cao Xiaobo; China
Optimist	Chae Bong-jin; South Korea	Mohd Nazmi Sharif; Malaysia	Roy Tay; Singapore
420	Singapore; Siew Shaw Her; Colin Ng	South Korea; Park Jong-woo; Kim Hyeong-tae	Thailand; Wiwat Poonpat; Kitipong Khambang
470	South Korea; Kim Dae-young; Jung Sung-ahn	Japan; Eiichiro Hamazaki; Masato Takaki	Singapore; Tan Wearn Haw; Charles Lim

=== Women ===
Event	Gold	Silver	Bronze
Mistral	Lee Lai Shan; Hong Kong	Huang Ying; China	Masako Imai; Japan
Europe	Zhang Hong; China	Aiko Saito; Japan	Tracey Tan; Singapore
Optimist	Kim Suk-kyong; South Korea	Shen Xiaoying; China	Prapawadee Damdangdee; Thailand
420	Singapore; Joan Huang; Naomi Tan	Thailand; Wandee Vongtim; Theeranoot Vongruck	Hong Kong; Mou Lap Kam; Lee Chun Yi
470	China; Yang Xiaoyan; Li Dongying	Japan; Chizuko Ijima; Makiko Ikuta	South Korea; Kim Myoung-hwa; Jung Eun-suk

=== Open ===
Event	Gold	Silver	Bronze
OK	Jin Hong-chul; South Korea	Anthony Kiong; Singapore	Prasertsak Moolprasert; Thailand
Super Moth	Damrongsak Vongtim; Thailand	Malik Sulaiman; Malaysia	Zahid Rauf; Pakistan
Enterprise	South Korea; Chung Yoon-gil; Lim Jin-young	Pakistan; Mamoon Sadiq; Munir Sadiq	Sri Lanka; Lalin Jirasinha; Krishan Janaka

== Medal table ==
Rank	Nation	Gold	Silver	Bronze	Total
1	South Korea (KOR)	6	1	3	10
2	China (CHN)	3	3	2	8
3	Thailand (THA)	3	1	4	8
4	Singapore (SIN)	2	1	3	6
5	Hong Kong (HKG)	1	1	1	3
6	Indonesia (INA)	1	0	0	1
7	Japan (JPN)	0	4	1	5
8	Malaysia (MAS)	0	3	0	3
9	Pakistan (PAK)	0	1	1	2
10	Chinese Taipei (TPE)	0	1	0	1
11	Sri Lanka (SRI)	0	0	1	1
Totals (11 entries)		16	16	16	48

== Participating nations ==
A total of 122 athletes from 16 nations competed in sailing at the 1998 Asian Games:

- China (13)
- Chinese Taipei (3)
- Hong Kong (14)
- India (7)
- Indonesia (3)
- Japan (11)
- Kazakhstan (1)
- Kuwait (2)
- Malaysia (3)
- Pakistan (10)
- Philippines (3)
- Qatar (1)
- Singapore (11)
- South Korea (15)
- Sri Lanka (4)
- Thailand (21)
