= Sailing at the 2000 Summer Olympics – Men's Mistral One Design =

Sailing at the Olympics

Men's Mistral One Design at the Games of the XXVII Olympiad
- Line drawing of the Mistral One Design
- Venue: Sydney
- Dates: First race: 17 September 2000; Last race: 24 September 2000
- Competitors: 36 from 36 nations

Medalists
| 1st place, gold medalist(s) | | Christoph Sieber | Austria |
| 2nd place, silver medalist(s) | | Carlos Espinola | Argentina |
| 3rd place, bronze medalist(s) | | Aaron McIntosh | New Zealand |

The Men's Mistral One Design Class was a sailing event on the Sailing at the 2000 Summer Olympics program in Sydney. Eleven races were scheduled and completed. 36 sailors, on 36 sailboards, from 36 nations competed.

== Race schedule ==
| ● | Event competitions | ● | Event finals |

| Date | September | | | | | | | | | | | | | | | | October |
| Date | 15 Fri | 16 Sat | 17 Sun | 18 Mon | 19 Tue | 20 Wed | 21 Thu | 22 Fri | 23 Sat | 24 Sun | 25 Mon | 26 Tue | 27 Wed | 28 Thu | 29 Fri | 30 Sat | 1 Sun |
|---|---|---|---|---|---|---|---|---|---|---|---|---|---|---|---|---|---|
| Men's Mistral One Design | | | 2 | 1 | 1 | 2 | 2 | 2 | Spare day | 1 | | | | | | | |

== Final results ==
| Rank | Country | Helmsman | Race 1 | | Race 2 | | Race 3 | | Race 4 | | Race 5 | | Race 6 | | Race 7 | | Race 8 | | Race 9 | | Race 10 | | Race 11 | | Total | Total – discard |
| Rank | Country | Helmsman | Pos. | Pts. | Pos. | Pts. | Pos. | Pts. | Pos. | Pts. | Pos. | Pts. | Pos. | Pts. | Pos. | Pts. | Pos. | Pts. | Pos. | Pts. | Pos. | Pts. | Pos. | Pts. | Total | Total – discard |
| 1st place, gold medalist(s) | Austria | Christoph Sieber | 1 | 1.0 | 2 | 2.0 | 1 | 1.0 | ~~24~~ | ~~24.0~~ | 1 | 1.0 | 10 | 10.0 | 7 | 7.0 | ~~23~~ | ~~23.0~~ | 4 | 4.0 | 5 | 5.0 | 7 | 7.0 | 85.0 | 38.0 |
| 2nd place, silver medalist(s) | Argentina | Carlos Espínola | 8 | 8.0 | 3 | 3.0 | 8 | 8.0 | 1 | 1.0 | 5 | 5.0 | 7 | 7.0 | 2 | 2.0 | ~~26~~ | ~~26.~~ | 6 | 6.0 | ~~11~~ | ~~11.0~~ | 3 | 3.0 | 80.0 | 43.0 |
| 3rd place, bronze medalist(s) | New Zealand | Aaron McIntosh | ~~OCS~~ | ~~37.0~~ | 9 | 9.0 | 4 | 4.0 | 10 | 10.0 | 9 | 9.0 | 3 | 3.0 | 1 | 1.0 | 5 | 5.0 | ~~12~~ | ~~12.0~~ | 3 | 3.0 | 4 | 4.0 | 97.0 | 48.0 |
| 4 | Australia | Lars Kleppich | 4 | 4.0 | ~~OCS~~ | ~~37.0~~ | ~~18~~ | ~~18.0~~ | 3 | 3.0 | 8 | 8.0 | 1 | 1.0 | 18 | 18.0 | 8 | 8.0 | 5 | 5.0 | 9 | 9.0 | 5 | 5.0 | 116.0 | 61.0 |
| 5 | China | Zhou Yuanguo | ~~OCS~~ | ~~37.0~~ | 6 | 6.0 | 23 | 23.0 | ~~DSQ~~ | ~~37.0~~ | 18 | 18.0 | 2 | 2.0 | 3 | 3.0 | 2 | 2.0 | 1 | 1.0 | 1 | 1.0 | 8 | 8.0 | 138.0 | 64.0 |
| 6 | Greece | Nikolaos Kaklamanakis | ~~20~~ | ~~20.0~~ | 12 | 12.0 | 5 | 5.0 | 9 | 9.0 | 7 | 7.0 | 6 | 6.0 | 4 | 4.0 | ~~DSQ~~ | ~~37.0~~ | 7 | 7.0 | 13 | 13.0 | 1 | 1.0 | 121.0 | 64.0 |
| 7 | Israel | Amit Inbar | 3 | 3.0 | 13 | 13.0 | ~~14~~ | ~~14.0~~ | 13 | 13.0 | 13 | 13.0 | 5 | 5.0 | ~~OCS~~ | ~~37.0~~ | 4 | 4.0 | 13 | 13.0 | 4 | 4.0 | 11 | 11.0 | 130.0 | 79.0 |
| 8 | Poland | Przemysław Miarczyński | ~~19~~ | ~~19.0~~ | 8 | 8.0 | 7 | 7.0 | 14 | 14.0 | 2 | 2.0 | 8 | 8.0 | 15 | 15.0 | ~~18~~ | ~~18.0~~ | 10 | 10.0 | 6 | 6.0 | 14 | 14.0 | 121.0 | 84.0 |
| 9 | Germany | Alexander Baronjan | 13 | 13.0 | 5 | 5.0 | 6 | 6.0 | 5 | 5.0 | 10 | 10.0 | 11 | 11.0 | 9 | 9.0 | ~~DNF~~ | ~~37.0~~ | 17 | 17.0 | 8 | 8.0 | ~~18~~ | ~~18.0~~ | 139.0 | 84.0 |
| 10 | Fiji | Tony Philp | 17 | 17.0 | 11 | 11.0 | 3 | 3.0 | 21 | 21.0 | ~~33~~ | ~~33.0~~ | 13 | 13.0 | ~~22~~ | ~~22.0~~ | 3 | 3.0 | 2 | 2.0 | 12 | 12.0 | 6 | 6.0 | 143.0 | 88.0 |
| 11 | United States | Mike Gebhardt | 2 | 2.0 | ~~22~~ | ~~22.0~~ | 10 | 10.0 | 16 | 16.0 | 11 | 11.0 | 9 | 9.0 | 10 | 10.0 | 7 | 7.0 | 11 | 11.0 | 16 | 16.0 | ~~17~~ | ~~17.0~~ | 131.0 | 92.0 |
| 12 | France | Alexandre Guyader | 22 | 22.0 | 4 | 4.0 | ~~28~~ | ~~28.0~~ | 6 | 6.0 | 4 | 4.0 | 15 | 15.0 | 5 | 5.0 | 11 | 11.0 | 9 | 9.0 | ~~26~~ | ~~26.0~~ | 24 | 24.0 | 154.0 | 100.0 |
| 13 | Chinese Taipei | Ted Huang | 6 | 6.0 | 7 | 7.0 | 16 | 16.0 | ~~22~~ | ~~22.0~~ | 14 | 14.0 | ~~17~~ | ~~17.0~~ | 13 | 13.0 | 6 | 6.0 | 8 | 8.0 | 14 | 14.0 | 16 | 16.0 | 139.0 | 100.0 |
| 14 | Ukraine | Maksym Oberemko | 7 | 7.0 | 23 | 23.0 | 15 | 15.0 | 18 | 18.0 | ~~30~~ | ~~30.0~~ | 16 | 16.0 | 6 | 6.0 | 1 | 1.0 | ~~26~~ | ~~26.0~~ | 20 | 20.0 | 2 | 2.0 | 164.0 | 108.0 |
| 15 | Brazil | Ricardo Santos | 5 | 5.0 | 10 | 10.0 | 21 | 21.0 | 12 | 12.0 | 22 | 22.0 | 4 | 4.0 | 8 | 8.0 | 14 | 14.0 | ~~OCS~~ | ~~37.0~~ | 21 | 21.0 | ~~26~~ | ~~26.0~~ | 180.0 | 117.0 |
| 16 | Great Britain | Nick Dempsey | ~~OCS~~ | ~~37.0~~ | 15 | 15.0 | 2 | 2.0 | ~~28~~ | ~~28.0~~ | 19 | 19.0 | 27 | 27.0 | 23 | 23.0 | 9 | 9.0 | 19 | 19.0 | 2 | 2.0 | 9 | 9.0 | 190.0 | 125.0 |
| 17 | Italy | Riccardo Giordano | ~~25~~ | ~~25.0~~ | 14 | 14.0 | 22 | 22.0 | ~~29~~ | ~~29.0~~ | 6 | 6.0 | 21 | 21.0 | 11 | 11.0 | 21 | 21.0 | 3 | 3.0 | 18 | 18.0 | 12 | 12.0 | 182.0 | 128.0 |
| 18 | Portugal | João Rodrigues | 9 | 9.0 | 25 | 25.0 | ~~DNF~~ | ~~37.0~~ | 7 | 7.0 | 3 | 3.0 | 20 | 20.0 | ~~28~~ | ~~28.0~~ | 19 | 19.0 | 16 | 16.0 | 7 | 7.0 | 23 | 23.0 | 194.0 | 129.0 |
| 19 | Indonesia | I Gusti Made Oka Sulaksana | 15 | 15.0 | 1 | 1.0 | 11 | 11.0 | ~~27~~ | ~~27.0~~ | 23 | 23.0 | ~~25~~ | ~~25.0~~ | 17 | 17.0 | 10 | 10.0 | 22 | 22.0 | 24 | 24.0 | 10 | 10.0 | 185.0 | 133.0 |
| 20 | Japan | Motokazu Kenjo | 10 | 10.0 | 18 | 18.0 | 9 | 9.0 | 20 | 20.0 | 28 | 28.0 | 12 | 12.0 | 12 | 12.0 | 12 | 12.0 | 15 | 15.0 | ~~OCS~~ | ~~37.0~~ | ~~31~~ | ~~31.0~~ | 204.0 | 136.0 |
| 21 | South Korea | Ok Duck-pil | 21 | 21.0 | ~~28~~ | ~~28.0~~ | 12 | 12.0 | 4 | 4.0 | 16 | 16.0 | 18 | 18.0 | 14 | 14.0 | 24 | 24.0 | 20 | 20.0 | 23 | 23.0 | ~~25~~ | ~~25.0~~ | 205.0 | 152.0 |
| 22 | Spain | Andres Jorge Maciel | 16 | 16.0 | 17 | 17.0 | ~~25~~ | ~~25.0~~ | 8 | 8.0 | 25 | 25.0 | 22 | 22.0 | 20 | 20.0 | 20 | 20.0 | ~~DNF~~ | ~~37.0~~ | 15 | 15.0 | 19 | 19.0 | 224.0 | 162.0 |
| 23 | Sweden | Fredrik Palm | ~~30~~ | ~~30.0~~ | 21 | 21.0 | ~~30~~ | ~~30.0~~ | 2 | 2.0 | 12 | 12.0 | 14 | 14.0 | 26 | 26.0 | 22 | 22.0 | 25 | 25.0 | 28 | 28.0 | 15 | 15.0 | 225.0 | 165.0 |
| 24 | Hungary | Áron Gádorfalvi | ~~24~~ | ~~24.0~~ | 19 | 19.0 | 19 | 19.0 | 23 | 23.0 | 21 | 21.0 | 23 | 23.0 | 21 | 21.0 | 17 | 17.0 | 14 | 14.0 | ~~OCS~~ | ~~37.0~~ | 20 | 20.0 | 238.0 | 177.0 |
| 25 | Mexico | David Mier | 14 | 14.0 | 24 | 24.0 | 26 | 26.0 | 17 | 17.0 | 26 | 26.0 | 19 | 19.0 | 16 | 16.0 | 15 | 15.0 | 28 | 28.0 | ~~OCS~~ | ~~37.0~~ | ~~27~~ | ~~27.0~~ | 249.0 | 184.0 |
| 26 | Slovakia | Patrik Pollák | 11 | 11.0 | 20 | 20.0 | ~~27~~ | ~~27.0~~ | 26 | 26.0 | 17 | 17.0 | 24 | 24.0 | 25 | 25.0 | 27 | 27.0 | 21 | 21.0 | 17 | 17.0 | ~~30~~ | ~~30.0~~ | 245.0 | 188.0 |
| 27 | Venezuela | Yamil Saba | 18 | 18.0 | 30 | 30.0 | ~~DNF~~ | ~~37.0~~ | 15 | 15.0 | 20 | 20.0 | 29 | 29.0 | ~~34~~ | ~~34.0~~ | 32 | 32.0 | 24 | 24.0 | 10 | 10.0 | 22 | 22.0 | 271.0 | 200.0 |
| 28 | Hong Kong | Ho Chi Ho | 12 | 12.0 | 29 | 29.0 | 29 | 29.0 | 19 | 19.0 | 24 | 24.0 | ~~31~~ | ~~31.0~~ | 27 | 27.0 | 13 | 13.0 | 18 | 18.0 | ~~32~~ | ~~32.0~~ | 29 | 29.0 | 263.0 | 200.0 |
| 29 | Thailand | Arun Homraruen | 27 | 27.0 | 26 | 26.0 | 13 | 13.0 | 25 | 25.0 | 29 | 29.0 | 26 | 26.0 | 19 | 19.0 | 16 | 16.0 | 23 | 23.0 | ~~30~~ | ~~30.0~~ | ~~32~~ | ~~32.0~~ | 266.0 | 204.0 |
| 30 | Cyprus | Demetris Lappas | 28 | 28.0 | 16 | 16.0 | 20 | 20.0 | ~~32~~ | ~~32.0~~ | 27 | 27.0 | ~~33~~ | ~~33.0~~ | 31 | 31.0 | 29 | 29.0 | 30 | 30.0 | 19 | 19.0 | 13 | 13.0 | 278.0 | 213.0 |
| 31 | Turkey | Ertuğrul İçingir | 26 | 26.0 | ~~OCS~~ | ~~37.0~~ | 24 | 24.0 | 11 | 11.0 | 15 | 15.0 | 28 | 28.0 | 29 | 29.0 | 25 | 25.0 | ~~OCS~~ | ~~37.0~~ | 22 | 22.0 | DSQ | 37.0 | 291.0 | 217.0 |
| 32 | Virgin Islands | Paul Stoeken | 23 | 23.0 | 27 | 27.0 | ~~DNF~~ | ~~37.0~~ | 31 | 31.0 | 32 | 32.0 | 30 | 30.0 | 24 | 24.0 | ~~28~~ | ~~28.0~~ | 27 | 27.0 | 25 | 25.0 | 21 | 21.0 | 305.0 | 236.0 |
| 33 | Russia | Vladimir Moiseyev | 29 | 29.0 | ~~31~~ | ~~31.0~~ | 17 | 17.0 | ~~30~~ | ~~30.0~~ | 34 | 34.0 | 32 | 32.0 | 30 | 30.0 | 30 | 30.0 | 29 | 29.0 | 27 | 27.0 | 28 | 28.0 | 317.0 | 251.0 |
| 34 | Barbados | O'Neal Marshall | ~~DNF~~ | ~~37.0~~ | 32 | 32.0 | 32 | 32.0 | ~~34~~ | ~~34.0~~ | 31 | 31.0 | 34 | 34.0 | 32 | 32.0 | 31 | 31.0 | 31 | 31.0 | 31 | 31.0 | 33 | 33.0 | 358.0 | 287.0 |
| 35 | Seychelles | Jonathan Barbe | 31 | 31.0 | 33 | 33.0 | 31 | 31.0 | 33 | 33.0 | ~~35~~ | ~~35.0~~ | ~~DNC~~ | ~~37.0~~ | 33 | 33.0 | 33 | 33.0 | DNC | 33.0 | 29 | 29.0 | 34 | 34.0 | 366.0 | 292.0 |
| 36 | Morocco | Rachid Roussafi | 32 | 32.0 | 34 | 34.0 | 33 | 33.0 | ~~35~~ | ~~35.0~~ | ~~36~~ | ~~36.0~~ | 35 | 35.0 | 35 | 35.0 | 34 | 34.0 | 32 | 32.0 | 33 | 33.0 | 35 | 35.0 | 374.0 | 303.0 |

Legend: DNC – Did not come to the starting area; DNF – Did not finish; DSQ – Disqualified; OCS – On the course side of the starting line;
Discard is crossed out and does not count for the overall result.

== Daily standings ==
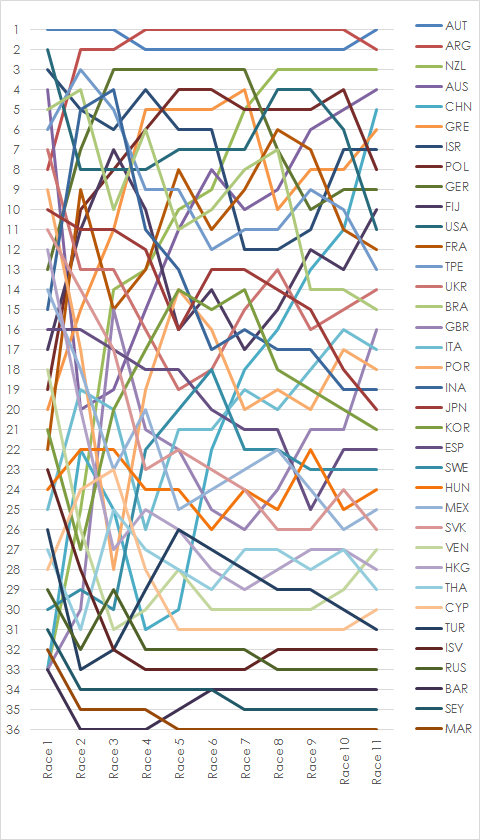
Graph showing the daily standings in the Men's Mistral One Design during the 2000 Summer Olympics
