= Sailing at the 1994 Asian Games =

- Venue: Hiroshima Bay
- Dates: 4–11 October 1994
- Competitors: 56 from 12 nations

Sailing was contested at the 1994 Asian Games in Kannon Marina, Hiroshima Bay, Hiroshima, Japan from October 4 to October 11.

== Medalists ==
=== Men ===
Event	Gold	Silver	Bronze
Mistral	Qian Hong; China	Sam Wong; Hong Kong	Arun Homraruen; Thailand
470	Japan; Kenji Nakamura; Masato Takaki	Singapore; Siew Shaw Her; Charles Lim	India; Farokh Tarapore; Kelly Subbanand Rao

=== Women ===
Event	Gold	Silver	Bronze
Mistral	Li Ke; China	Lee Lai Shan; Hong Kong	Joo Soon-ahn; South Korea
470	China; Li Sumei; Chen Xiumei	Japan; Mieko Kasai; Chinatsu Ojima	Hong Kong; Cheung Mei Han; Cheung Pui Shan

=== Open ===
Event	Gold	Silver	Bronze
Laser	Benedict Tan; Singapore	Jin Hong-chul; South Korea	Cao Xiaobo; China
Optimist	Ryan Tan; Malaysia	Tetsuya Matsunaga; Japan	Arsalan Khan; Pakistan
Enterprise	Japan; Hiroshi Maeda; Takayuki Goto	Pakistan; Munir Sadiq; Mamoon Sadiq	India; Homi Motivala; Pushpendra Kumar Garg

== Medal table ==
Rank	Nation	Gold	Silver	Bronze	Total
1	China (CHN)	3	0	1	4
2	Japan (JPN)	2	2	0	4
3	Singapore (SIN)	1	1	0	2
4	Malaysia (MAS)	1	0	0	1
5	Hong Kong (HKG)	0	2	1	3
6	Pakistan (PAK)	0	1	1	2
6	South Korea (KOR)	0	1	1	2
8	India (IND)	0	0	2	2
9	Thailand (THA)	0	0	1	1
Totals (9 entries)		7	7	7	21

== Participating nations ==
A total of 56 athletes from 12 nations competed in sailing at the 1994 Asian Games:

- China (8)
- Hong Kong (7)
- India (4)
- Indonesia (2)
- Japan (10)
- Malaysia (2)
- Myanmar (3)
- Pakistan (5)
- Philippines (1)
- Singapore (3)
- South Korea (10)
- Thailand (1)
