= Sailing at the 1970 Asian Games =

- Venue: Pattaya Bay

Sailing (as Yachting) was contested at the 1970 Asian Games in Pattaya Bay, Pattaya, Thailand in December 1970. There were five events in the competition.

== Medalists ==
Event	Gold	Silver	Bronze
OK	Kazuoki Matsuyama; Japan	Rachot Kanjanavanit; Thailand	Khin Thein; Burma
Super Moth	Takao Otani; Japan	Yeo See Teck; Singapore	Krirk Vanikkul; Thailand
Enterprise	Burma; Htoo Aung Gyi; Tun Kyi	Ceylon; Ray Wijewardene; Ekendra Edirisinghe	India; Soli Contractor; Afsar Hussain
Fireball	Thailand; Birabongse Bhanubandh; Arunee Bhanubandh	Singapore; David Low; James Tham	Burma; Tun Thein; Than Sein
Flying Dutchman	Japan; Akira Yamamura; Takashi Yamamura	Thailand; Dawee Chullasapya; Suthep Indrakosoom	Indonesia; John Gunawan; David Udjulawa

== Medal table ==
Rank	Nation	Gold	Silver	Bronze	Total
1	Japan (JPN)	3	0	0	3
2	Thailand (THA)	1	2	1	4
3	Burma (BIR)	1	0	2	3
4	Singapore (SIN)	0	2	0	2
5	Ceylon (CEY)	0	1	0	1
6	India (IND)	0	0	1	1
6	Indonesia (INA)	0	0	1	1
Totals (7 entries)		5	5	5	15
