= Sailing at the 1990 Asian Games =

- Venue: Qinhuangdao Aquatics sports center
- Dates: 23–30 September 1990

Sailing was contested at the 1990 Asian Games in Qinhuangdao, China from September 23 to September 30.

== Medalists ==
=== Men ===
Event	Gold	Silver	Bronze
Lechner A-390	Jiang Chen; China	Saard Panyawan; Thailand	Suh Young-keun; South Korea
470	Japan; Kenji Nakamura; Masayuki Takahashi	China; Zhang Yongqiang; Wang Yong	India; Farokh Tarapore; Cyrus Cama

=== Women ===
Event	Gold	Silver	Bronze
Lechner A-390	Zhang Xiaodong; China	Lee Lai Shan; Hong Kong	Joo Soon-ahn; South Korea
470	Japan; Yoko Uo; Muneko Adachi	China; Liao Xiaoyan; Liu Meiyun	South Korea; Kim Hye-suk; Jung Eun-suk

=== Open ===
Event	Gold	Silver	Bronze
Laser	Park Kil-chul; South Korea	Cao Xiaobo; China	Tomoyuki Sasaki; Japan
Optimist	Kazuto Seki; Japan	Choi Jung-yeon; South Korea	Thaweewat Ploypathom; Thailand
Enterprise	Pakistan; Munir Sadiq; Muhammad Zakaullah	Japan; Saburo Sato; Nobuhiro Utada	India; Pushpendra Kumar Garg; Homi Motivala

== Medal table ==
Rank	Nation	Gold	Silver	Bronze	Total
1	Japan (JPN)	3	1	1	5
2	China (CHN)	2	3	0	5
3	South Korea (KOR)	1	1	3	5
4	Pakistan (PAK)	1	0	0	1
5	Thailand (THA)	0	1	1	2
6	Hong Kong (HKG)	0	1	0	1
7	India (IND)	0	0	2	2
Totals (7 entries)		7	7	7	21
