= Sailing at the 1986 Asian Games =

- Venue: Busan Yachting Center
- Dates: 23–29 September 1986

Sailing was contested at the 1986 Asian Games in Busan Yachting Center, Busan, South Korea from 23 September 1986 to 29 September 1986.

There were five events in the competition.

== Medalists ==
Event	Gold	Silver	Bronze
Division II	Qi Jianguo; China	Saard Panyawan; Thailand	Abdul Malik Faisal; Indonesia
Laser	Park Kil-chul; South Korea	Koichiro Naito; Japan	Ma Youming; China
Optimist	Park Jong-woo; South Korea	Daisuke Miyamoto; Japan	Tosaporn Painupong; Thailand
470	China; Lin Jiacheng; Chen Hongtai	India; Farokh Tarapore; Dhruv Bhandari	Japan; Norio Ogasawara; Hiroyuki Kuriyama
Enterprise	Pakistan; Munir Sadiq; Muhammad Zakaullah	South Korea; Ahn Cheul-ung; Kim Seung-suk	Japan; Saburo Sato; Tatsuya Wakinaga

== Medal table ==
Rank	Nation	Gold	Silver	Bronze	Total
1	South Korea (KOR)	2	1	0	3
2	China (CHN)	2	0	1	3
3	Pakistan (PAK)	1	0	0	1
4	Japan (JPN)	0	2	2	4
5	Thailand (THA)	0	1	1	2
6	India (IND)	0	1	0	1
7	Indonesia (INA)	0	0	1	1
Totals (7 entries)		5	5	5	15
