= Singapore Sailing Federation =

Singapore Sailing Federation SSF
- IOC nation: Singapore
- Sport: Sailing
- Official website: www.sailing.org.sg

HISTORY
- Year of formation: 1954

AFFILIATIONS
- International federation: International Sailing Federation (ISAF)
- ISAF members page: www.sailing.org/about-isaf/mna/singapore.php
- ISAF member since: 1960s
- National Olympic Committee: Singapore National Olympic Council

ELECTED
- President: Lincoln Chee
- Executive Director: Terence Ho

FINANCE
- Company status: Charity Organisation

The Singapore Sailing Federation (Abbreviation: SSF; Chinese: 新加坡帆船协会), also known as SingaporeSailing, is the National Sports Association (NSA) responsible for the management and organisation of the sport of sailing in Singapore.

The Federation works closely with Sport Singapore, on various fronts and adheres to the various rules and regulations required by Sport Singapore for NSAs. SingaporeSailing works with various clubs and affiliates in Singapore and also the Singapore National Olympic Council (SNOC) and World Sailing on the high performance front.

The Federation is currently headed by Lincoln Chee and it is headquartered at the National Sailing Centre in East Coast Park.

== History ==
In 1966, the Singapore Yachting Association was founded by Jack Snowden who served as its first president.

In 1994, the National Optimist Sailing Scheme (NOSS) was set up to focus on training sailors on the Optimist class. A National Optimist Certification Scheme was introduced in 2000 to recognise young sailors who take up sailing.

On 29 April 2000, the Singapore Yachting Association was renamed as Singapore Sailing Federation, also known as SingaporeSailing.

== Organisation ==
In September 2010, Federation revealed a strategic blueprint called The Next Leg. It seeks to steer the development of sailing in the next decade via 10 Strategic Thrusts. These thrusts guide the Federation's efforts as it continues to forge ahead. Besides heightening focus on High Performance operations and programmes, in line with the recommendations put forth by the Olympic Pathway Taskforce in 2011, the Federation also set up a High Participation Committee in 2015 to coordinate efforts in sailing participation islandwide.

=== Executive committee and board members ===
- President - Lincoln Chee
- Deputy President - Stanley Chan
- Vice President - Jevan Tan
- Vice President - Pamela Goh
- Vice President - Alan Goh
- Honorary Treasurer - James Tan
- Deputy Treasurer - Toh Liying

=== Presidents ===
- Jack Snowden - 1965 to 1972
- Seah Peng Yong - 1972 to 1975
- C. Kuttan - 1975 to 1989
- Ng Ser Miang - 1989 to 1991
- Peter H. L. Lim - 1992 to 1993
- Ong Siong Kai - 1993 to 1998
- Low Teo Ping - 1998 to 2010
- Ben Tan - 2010 to 2018
- Lincoln Chee - 2018 to Present

=== Clubs and affiliates ===
- Changi Sailing Club
- Constant Wind Sea Sports @ NSRCC Sea Sports Centre
- Kitesurfing Association of Singapore
- Marina at Keppel Bay
- One Degree 15 Marina Club
- Outward Bound Singapore
- Raffles Marina
- Republic of Singapore Yacht Club
- SAF Yacht Club
- Seletar Country Club
- Singapore Disability Sports Council
- Singapore Polytechnic Student Yacht Club
- SMU Sailing Club
- Water Venture PA (East Coast)
- Windsurfing Association of Singapore
- Aloha Sea Sports Centre

== Events ==
SingaporeSailing organises several events and regattas each year to maintain a sailing landscape and to engage the community. While there are many regattas each year, some are staple regattas that are held every year.

=== Singapore Youth Sailing Championship ===
The Singapore Youth Sailing Championship is the largest youth regatta in the local sailing calendar. It is typically held in March, in conjunction with the week-long school holiday in Singapore. The regatta is held at the National Sailing Centre, which is an accredited World Sailing Approved Training Centre.

The Singapore Youth Sailing Championship is also an international regatta where sailors from overseas are allowed to participate in. The regatta typically witnesses around 350 sailors from 11 different countries competing over 3 or 4 days.

The title of the regatta also varies depending on sponsorship as well as the theme of the event. In 2019, the regatta is called the Singapore Youth Team Racing Championship.

=== Singapore National Sailing Championship ===
The Singapore National Sailing Championship is the largest regatta in the local sailing calendar, attracting more than 400 sailors from 15 countries. The regatta is typically held in June, coinciding with the month-long June school holidays and it is held over 5 days.

Similar to the Singapore Youth Sailing Championship, the Singapore National Sailing Championship is held at the National Sailing Centre.

=== NSC Cup Series ===
The NSC Cup Series comprises three small regattas where sailors across different boat classes compete over three days of racing. Each regatta has a small awards ceremony, while the third and final regatta determines the overall winner of the NSC Cup Series for the year. Points are calculated and aggregated based on the performance of sailors across all three regattas.

== Notable sailors ==
- Griselda Khng (49er FX) - Olympian
- Kimberly Lim (49er FX) - Olympian, Optimist World Championship Champion
- Ryan Lo (Laser Standard) - Olympian
- Cecilia Low (49er FX) - Olympian
- Jovina Choo Bei Fen (470) - Olympian
- Elisa Yukie Yokoyama (470), Optimist World Championship Champion
- Justin Liu (Nacra 17) - Olympian
- Denise Lim (Nacra 17) - Olympian
- Audrey Yong (Techno 293) - Olympian
- Colin Cheng (Laser) - Olympian

=== Asian Games Gold Medalists ===
- Andrew Paul Chan
- Colin Cheng
- Sherman Cheng
- Joan Huang
- Russell Kan
- Terence Koh
- Raynn Kwok
- Jodie Lai
- Rachel Lee
- Christopher Lim
- Kimberly Lim
- Lim Tze Ting
- Cecilia Low
- Colin Ng
- Savannah Siew
- Siew Shaw Her
- Maximilian Soh
- Benedict Tan
- Ivan Tan
- Naomi Tan
- Sarah Tan
- Renfred Tay
- Roy Tay
- Teo Wee Chin
- Justin Wong
- Xu Yuan Zhen
