= Kim Hye-suk =

Kim Hye-suk may refer to:

- Kim Hye-suk (speed skater)
- Kim Hye-suk (sailor)
