= Qian Hong =

Qian Hong is the name of:

- Qian Hong (Jin dynasty) (died 271), Chinese military general of the Jin dynasty
- Qian Hong (swimmer) (born 1971), female Chinese swimmer
- Qian Hong (windsurfer) (born 1971), Chinese windsurfer
- Qian Hong (badminton) (born 1976), Chinese badminton player
