= Changi Sailing Club =

Sailing club in Singapore

Logo

Changi Sailing Club (Abbreviation: CSC; Chinese: 樟宜帆船俱乐部) is a sailing club located in Changi, in the North-East of Singapore. It regularly organises and holds competitions for both dinghies as well as keelboats. Started in 1936, the club has had a rich history and is known for having produced notable sailors such as Benedict Tan, Siew Shaw Her, and more recently, Teo Wee Chin. It was originally the Royal Air Force sailing club alongside RAF Changi. The Sembawang Dockyard history also gives little mention of the years it was a Royal Naval Dockyard.

The club houses a bar where patrons can enjoy the seaview. The bar offers drinks and finger food.

== See also ==
- Sport in Singapore
