= Li Dongying =

Li Dongying, may refer to:

- Li Dongying (metallurgist) (1920–2020), Chinese metallurgist, member of the Chinese Academy of Engineering
- Li Dongying (sailor) (born 1978), Chinese sailor who competed in the 2000 Summer Olympics
