= Ken Choi =

Ken Choi may refer to:

- Kenneth Choi (born 1971), American actor
- Ken Choi (singer) (born 1960), singer and actor from Hong Kong
- Ken Choi (windsurfer) (born 1961), Hong Kong windsurfer
