= Saard Panyawan =

Thai windsurfer (born 1965)

Personal information
- Nationality: Thai
- Born: 11 January 1965 (age 61)

Sailing career
- Sport: Sailing
- Class(es): Windglider, Lechner Division II, Lechner A-390
Medal record
Men's sailing
Representing Thailand
Asian Games
Silver medal – second place	1986 Seoul	Lechner Division II
Silver medal – second place	1990 Beijing	Lechner A-390

Saard Panyawan (Thai: สะอาด ปัญญาวัน, born 11 January 1965) is a Thai windsurfer. He placed 23rd in the Windglider event the 1984 Summer Olympics and 26th in the Men's Lechner A-390 event at the 1992 Summer Olympics.
