= Abdul Malik Faisal =

Indonesian windsurfer (born 1967)

Personal information
- Nationality: Indonesian
- Born: 3 April 1967 (age 59)
- Height: 172 cm (5 ft 8 in)
- Weight: 66 kg (146 lb)

Sailing career
- Sport: Sailing
- Class: Lechner Division II
Medal record
Men's sailing
Representing Indonesia
Asian Games
Bronze medal – third place	1986 Seoul	Lechner Division II

Abdul Malik Faisal (born 3 April 1967) is an Indonesian windsurfer. He competed in the men's Division II event at the 1988 Summer Olympics.
