= Rachid Roussafi =

Moroccan windsurfer

Personal information
- Nationality: Moroccan
- Born: 16 December 1970 (age 55)

Sport
- Sport: Windsurfing

Rachid Roussafi (born 16 December 1970) is a Moroccan windsurfer. He competed in the men's Mistral One Design event at the 2000 Summer Olympics.
