= Park Kil-chul =

South Korean sailor

Personal information
- Nationality: South Korean
- Born: 19 April 1963 (age 63) Yeocheon City, South Korea
- Height: 184 cm (6 ft 0 in)
- Weight: 81 kg (179 lb)

Korean name
- Hangul: 박길철
- Hanja: 朴吉哲
- RR: Bak Gilcheol
- MR: Pak Kilch'ŏl

Sailing career
- Sport: Sailing
- College team: Yeosu National Fisheries University
- Class(es): Laser, Finn
Medal record
Sailing
Representing South Korea
Asian Games
Gold medal – first place	1986 Seoul	Laser
Gold medal – first place	1990 Beijing	Laser

Park Kil-chul (Korean: 박길철, also known as Park Gil-cheol, born 19 April 1963) is a South Korean sailor. He competed in the Finn event at the 1988 Summer Olympics.

Born in Yeocheon City, Park began learning to sail in 1982 at Manseong-ri Beach. Park attended Daejeon Gubong High School and Yeosu National Fisheries University (now the Chonnam National University College of Fisheries and Ocean Sciences). In domestic competition, he represented Yeosu City and later Yeocheon City. He won a gold medal for South Korea at the 1986 Asian Games. In later years he served variously as the head coach of the Yeosu City Hall sailing team, a vice-president of the Korea Sailing Federation, and a member of the board of directors of the Jeonnam Sailing Federation.
