= Policarpio Ortega =

Filipino windsurfer

Personal information
- Nationality: Filipino

Sailing career
- Sport: Sailing
- Class: Windglider
Medal record
Men's sailing
Representing Philippines
Asian Games
Silver medal – second place	1982 Delhi	Windglider

Policarpio Ortega is a Filipino windsurfer. He competed in the Windglider event at the 1984 Summer Olympics.
