= Jiang Chen (windsurfer) =

Chinese windsurfer (born 1966)

Personal information
- Nationality: Chinese
- Born: 1 March 1966 (age 60) Dalai, Heilongjiang

Sailing career
- Sport: Sailing
- Class(es): Lechner, ILCA 7
Medal record
Men's sailing
Representing China
Asian Games
Gold medal – first place	1990 Beijing	Lechner A-390

Jiang Chen (Chinese: 蔣琛, born 1 March 1966) is a Chinese windsurfer. He competed at the 1988 Summer Olympics and the 1992 Summer Olympics.
