= Suh Young-keun =

South Korean windsurfer

Personal information
- Nationality: South Korean
- Born: 13 September 1967 (age 58)

Sailing career
- Sport: Sailing
- Class: Lechner A-390
Medal record
Men's sailing
Representing South Korea
Asian Games
Bronze medal – third place	1990 Beijing	Lechner A-390

Suh Young-keun (Korean: 서용근, also known as Seo Yong-geun, born 13 September 1967) is a South Korean windsurfer. He competed in the men's Lechner A-390 event at the 1992 Summer Olympics.
