= Sam Wong (windsurfer) =

Hong Kong windsurfer

Personal information
- Full name: Tak Sum Wong
- Nationality: China Hong Kong
- Born: 22 January 1965 (age 61) Hong Kong
- Height: 1.70 m (5 ft 7 in)
- Weight: 63 kg (139 lb)

Sailing career
- Sport: Sailing
Medal record
Men's sailing
Representing Hong Kong
Asian Games
Silver medal – second place	1994 Hiroshima	Mistral
Silver medal – second place	1998 Bangkok	Raceboard light

Tak Sum Wong (Chinese: 黃德森, also known as Sam Wong, born 22 January 1965) is a Hong Kong windsurfer. He competed in the 1988 Summer Olympics, the 1992 Summer Olympics, and the 1996 Summer Olympics. He has been appointed as the Commissioner for Sports at the Culture, Sports and Tourism Bureau of the Government of Hong Kong on 22 August 2023.
