= Sailing at the 2002 Asian Games – Laser Radial =

Open Laser Radial at the 2002 Asian Games
- Venue: Busan Yachting Center
- Date: 3–9 October 2002
- Competitors: 6 from 6 nations

Medalists
gold medal	Shen Sheng	China
silver medal	Kim Jung-gon	South Korea
bronze medal	Rajesh Choudhary	India

The open Laser Radial competition at the 2002 Asian Games in Busan was held from 3 to 9 October 2002.

== Schedule ==
All times are Korea Standard Time (UTC+09:00)

Date	Time	Event
Thursday, 3 October 2002	11:00	Race 1
Thursday, 3 October 2002	14:00	Race 2
Friday, 4 October 2002	11:00	Race 3
Saturday, 5 October 2002	10:00	Race 4
Saturday, 5 October 2002	11:00	Race 5
Saturday, 5 October 2002	14:00	Race 6
Monday, 7 October 2002	11:00	Race 7
Monday, 7 October 2002	14:00	Race 8
Tuesday, 8 October 2002	11:00	Race 9
Tuesday, 8 October 2002	14:00	Race 10
Wednesday, 9 October 2002	11:00	Race 11

== Results ==
Legend

- DSQ — Disqualification
- RAF — Retired after finishing

Rank	Athlete	Race											Total
Rank	Athlete	1	2	3	4	5	6	7	8	9	10	11	Total
1st place, gold medalist(s)	Shen Sheng (CHN)	1	1	1	1	1	1	2	~~(4)~~	1	~~(4)~~	X	9
2nd place, silver medalist(s)	Kim Jung-gon (KOR)	2	2	~~(3)~~	2	2	2	1	1	~~(7)~~; ~~DSQ~~	3	X	15
3rd place, bronze medalist(s)	Rajesh Choudhary (IND)	~~(4)~~	3	2	3	~~(4)~~	4	3	3	3	1	X	22
4	Stanley Tan (SIN)	3	~~(4)~~	~~(4)~~	4	3	3	4	2	2	2	X	23
5	Nayef Al-Hadah (KUW)	5	5	~~(6)~~	5	5	~~(7)~~; RAF	5	5	5	5	X	40
6	Hassan Al-Baker (QAT)	~~(6)~~	~~(6)~~	6	6	6	5	6	6	4	6	X	45
