= Aiko Saito =

Japanese sailor (born 1958)

Personal information
- Nationality: Japanese
- Born: 8 August 1958 (age 67) Tokyo, Japan
- Height: 165 cm (5 ft 5 in)
- Weight: 74 kg (163 lb)

Sailing career
- Sport: Sailing
- Club: TOA Yacht Club
- Class(es): Europe, 470, ILCA 7
Medal record
Women's sailing
Representing Japan
Asian Games
Silver medal – second place	1998 Bangkok	Europe

Aiko Saito (齋藤 愛子, Saitō Aiko; born 8 August 1958) is a Japanese sailor. She competed at the 1988 Summer Olympics and the 1996 Summer Olympics.
