= Joo Soon-ahn =

South Korean windsurfer (born 1970)

Personal information
- Nationality: South Korea
- Born: 7 August 1970 (age 55) Yochon, South Korea
- Height: 1.65 m (5 ft 5 in)
- Weight: 63 kg (139 lb)

Sailing career
- Sport: Sailing
- Class: Mistral
Medal record
Women's sailing
Representing South Korea
Asian Games
Bronze medal – third place	1990 Beijing	Lechner A-390
Bronze medal – third place	1994 Hiroshima	Mistral

Joo Soon-ahn (Korean: 주순안, also known as Ju Sun-an, born 7 August 1970) is a South Korean sailor. She competed in the 1996 Summer Olympics and the 2000 Summer Olympics.
