= Li Ke (windsurfer) =

Chinese windsurfer

Personal information
- Nationality: Chinese
- Born: 1 July 1969 (age 56) Fushun, Liaoning, China
- Height: 167 cm (5 ft 6 in)
- Weight: 68 kg (150 lb)

Sailing career
- Sport: Sailing
- Class: Mistral
Medal record
Women's sailing
Representing China
Asian Games
Gold medal – first place	1994 Hiroshima	Mistral

Li Ke (Chinese: 李科; pinyin: Lǐ Kē; born 1 July 1969) is a Chinese windsurfer. She finished 4th in the Women's Mistral One Design event at the 1996 Summer Olympics.
