= Sailing at the 2002 Asian Games – Enterprise =

Open Enterprise at the 2002 Asian Games
- Venue: Busan Yachting Center
- Date: 3–9 October 2002
- Competitors: 10 from 5 nations

Medalists
gold medal	Jun Joo-hyun; Jung Kwon	South Korea
silver medal	Shehryar Arshad; Muhammad Riaz	Pakistan
bronze medal	Aashim Mongia; Mahesh Ramchandran	India

The open Enterprise competition at the 2002 Asian Games in Busan was held from 3 to 9 October 2002.

== Schedule ==
All times are Korea Standard Time (UTC+09:00)

Date	Time	Event
Thursday, 3 October 2002	11:00	Race 1
Thursday, 3 October 2002	14:00	Race 2
Friday, 4 October 2002	11:00	Race 3
Saturday, 5 October 2002	10:00	Race 4
Saturday, 5 October 2002	11:00	Race 5
Saturday, 5 October 2002	14:00	Race 6
Monday, 7 October 2002	11:00	Race 7
Tuesday, 8 October 2002	10:00	Race 8
Tuesday, 8 October 2002	11:00	Race 9
Wednesday, 9 October 2002	11:00	Race 10
Wednesday, 9 October 2002	14:00	Race 11

== Results ==
Legend

- DNF — Did not finish
- DSQ — Disqualification

Rank	Team	Race											Total
Rank	Team	1	2	3	4	5	6	7	8	9	10	11	Total
1st place, gold medalist(s)	South Korea (KOR); Jun Joo-hyun; Jung Kwon	1	1	~~(3)~~	1	1	1	2	3	2	X	X	12
2nd place, silver medalist(s)	Pakistan (PAK); Shehryar Arshad; Muhammad Riaz	3	~~(6)~~; DSQ	1	4	4	4	1	1	3	X	X	21
3rd place, bronze medalist(s)	India (IND); Aashim Mongia; Mahesh Ramchandran	2	2	~~4~~	2	2	2	4	4	4	X	X	22
4	Sri Lanka (SRI); Krishan Janaka; Lalin Jirasinha	4	~~(6)~~; DNF	5	3	5	3	3	2	1	X	X	26
5	Myanmar (MYA); Aung Myin Thu; Sai Pyae Sone Hein	~~(5)~~	3	2	5	3	5	5	5	5	X	X	33
