= Sailing at the 2002 Asian Games – OK =

Open OK at the 2002 Asian Games
- Venue: Busan Yachting Center
- Date: 3–9 October 2002
- Competitors: 4 from 4 nations

Medalists
gold medal	Jin Hong-chul	South Korea
silver medal	Nitin Mongia	India
bronze medal	Veerasit Puangnak	Thailand

The open OK Dinghy competition at the 2002 Asian Games in Busan was held from 3 to 9 October 2002.

== Schedule ==
All times are Korea Standard Time (UTC+09:00)

Date	Time	Event
Thursday, 3 October 2002	11:00	Race 1
Thursday, 3 October 2002	14:00	Race 2
Friday, 4 October 2002	11:00	Race 3
Saturday, 5 October 2002	10:00	Race 4
Saturday, 5 October 2002	11:00	Race 5
Saturday, 5 October 2002	14:00	Race 6
Monday, 7 October 2002	11:00	Race 7
Monday, 7 October 2002	14:00	Race 8
Tuesday, 8 October 2002	11:00	Race 9
Tuesday, 8 October 2002	14:00	Race 10
Wednesday, 9 October 2002	11:00	Race 11

== Results ==
Legend

- DSQ — Disqualification

Rank	Athlete	Race											Total
Rank	Athlete	1	2	3	4	5	6	7	8	9	10	11	Total
1st place, gold medalist(s)	Jin Hong-chul (KOR)	~~(2)~~	2	1	1	2	2	~~(4)~~	1	1	1	X	11
2nd place, silver medalist(s)	Nitin Mongia (IND)	1	1	~~(3)~~	3	1	1	2	~~(5)~~; DSQ	2	3	X	14
3rd place, bronze medalist(s)	Veerasit Puangnak (THA)	~~(3)~~	~~(3)~~	2	2	3	3	1	2	3	2	X	18
4	Stanley Chan (SIN)	~~(4)~~	~~(4)~~	4	4	4	4	3	3	4	4	X	30
