= Sailing at the 2002 Asian Games – Men's 420 =

Men's 420 at the 2002 Asian Games
- Venue: Busan Yachting Center
- Date: 3–9 October 2002
- Competitors: 16 from 8 nations

Medalists
gold medal	Lee Dong-woo; Park Jong-woo	South Korea
silver medal	Damrongsak Vongtim; Sittisak Musikul	Thailand
bronze medal	Tang Mingfeng; Ma Zhicheng	China

The men's 420 competition at the 2002 Asian Games in Busan was held from 3 to 9 October 2002.

== Schedule ==
All times are Korea Standard Time (UTC+09:00)

Date	Time	Event
Thursday, 3 October 2002	11:00	Race 1
Thursday, 3 October 2002	14:00	Race 2
Friday, 4 October 2002	11:00	Race 3
Saturday, 5 October 2002	10:00	Race 4
Saturday, 5 October 2002	11:00	Race 5
Saturday, 5 October 2002	14:00	Race 6
Monday, 7 October 2002	11:00	Race 7
Monday, 7 October 2002	14:00	Race 8
Tuesday, 8 October 2002	11:00	Race 9
Tuesday, 8 October 2002	14:00	Race 10
Wednesday, 9 October 2002	11:00	Race 11

== Results ==
Legend

- DNF — Did not finish

Rank	Team	Race											Total
Rank	Team	1	2	3	4	5	6	7	8	9	10	11	Total
1st place, gold medalist(s)	South Korea (KOR); Lee Dong-woo; Park Jong-woo	~~(3)~~	3	1	1	1	3	~~(5)~~	2	1	2	X	14
2nd place, silver medalist(s)	Thailand (THA); Damrongsak Vongtim; Sittisak Musikul	2	~~(5)~~	5	2	3	5	~~(7)~~	1	5	3	X	26
3rd place, bronze medalist(s)	China (CHN); Tang Mingfeng; Ma Zhicheng	1	1	~~(8)~~	7	4	1	6	~~(9)~~; DNF	3	5	X	28
4	India (IND); Farokh Tarapore; Vikas Kapila	~~(8)~~	~~(6)~~	4	3	2	6	3	5	2	4	X	29
5	Singapore (SIN); Ou Dahui; Roy Tay	5	2	3	~~(8)~~	5	4	1	6	4	~~(7)~~	X	30
6	Malaysia (MAS); Jeremy Koo; Looi Sing Yew	~~(6)~~	4	~~(6)~~	6	6	2	4	3	6	6	X	37
7	Myanmar (MYA); Phone Kyaw Moe Myint; Sithu Moe Myint	4	~~(8)~~	2	4	7	~~(8)~~	8	7	8	1	X	41
8	Hong Kong (HKG); Ashun Tong; Cheung Ka Ho	7	7	7	5	~~(8)~~	7	2	4	7	~~(8)~~	X	46
