= Akira Yamamura =

Japanese sailor (born 1936)

Personal information
- Nationality: Japanese
- Born: 8 June 1936
- Died: 3 November 2005 (aged 69)
- Height: 177 cm (5 ft 10 in)
- Weight: 78 kg (172 lb)

Sailing career
- Sport: Sailing
- Class: Flying Dutchman
Medal record
Sailing
Representing Japan
Asian Games
Gold medal – first place	1970 Bangkok	Flying Dutchman

Akira Yamamura (Japanese: 山村彰, 8 June 1936 – 3 November 2005) was a Japanese sailor. He competed in the Flying Dutchman event at the 1972 Summer Olympics.
