= Masako Imai =

Japanese windsurfer (born 1967)

Personal information
- Nationality: Japanese
- Born: 28 January 1967 (age 59) Setagaya, Japan
- Height: 1.50 m (4 ft 11 in)
- Weight: 55 kg (121 lb)

Sport
- Sport: Windsurfing
Medal record
Women's sailing
Representing Japan
Asian Games
Bronze medal – third place	1998 Bangkok	Mistral
Bronze medal – third place	2002 Busan	Mistral

Masako Imai (born 28 January 1967 in Setagaya) is a Japanese windsurfer. She competed in the 1996 Summer Olympics, the 2000 Summer Olympics, and the 2004 Summer Olympics.
