= Oka Sulaksana =

Indonesian sailor and windsurfer

Personal information
- Nationality: Indonesian
- Born: I Gusti Made Oka Sulaksana; 29 April 1971 (age 55) Sanur, Bali, Indonesia
Medal record
Men's sailing
Representing Indonesia
Asian Games
| Gold medal – first place | 1998 Bangkok | Mistral heavy |
| Gold medal – first place | 2002 Busan | Mistral heavy |
| Silver medal – second place | 2010 Guangzhou | Mistral |
| Bronze medal – third place | 2006 Doha | Mistral heavy |
Asian Beach Games
| Gold medal – first place | 2008 Bali | Mistral heavy |
Asian Championships
| Gold medal – first place | 2008 Sanur | Mistral OD |
SEA Games
| Gold medal – first place | 2007 Nakhon Ratchasima | Mistral heavy |
| Silver medal – second place | 2005 Manila | RS:X |
| Silver medal – second place | 2011 Jakarta–Palembang | Mistral OD |
| Bronze medal – third place | 2015 Singapore | RS:X |

I Gusti Made Oka Sulaksana (also known as Oka Sulaksana; born 29 April 1971) is an Indonesian professional sailor and windsurfer.

Oka won two Asian Games gold medal in 1998 and 2002. He also represented Indonesia in the 1996, 2000, and 2004 Summer Olympics, all of which in Mistral One Design event. He also represented Indonesia in the 2008 Summer Olympics on RS:X event and was the flag-bearer for the country at the opening ceremony.

Olympic Games
| Preceded by Christian Hadinata | Flagbearer for Indonesia; Beijing 2008 | Succeeded by I Gede Siman Sudartawa |
