= Sailing at the 2002 Asian Games – Men's Mistral light =

Men's Mistral light at the 2002 Asian Games
- Venue: Busan Yachting Center
- Date: 3–9 October 2002
- Competitors: 7 from 7 nations

Medalists
gold medal	Zhou Yuanguo	China
silver medal	Arun Homraruen	Thailand
bronze medal	Ikuo Inoue	Japan

The men's Mistral light competition at the 2002 Asian Games in Busan was held from 3 to 9 October 2002.

== Schedule ==
All times are Korea Standard Time (UTC+09:00)

Date	Time	Event
Thursday, 3 October 2002	11:00	Race 1
Thursday, 3 October 2002	14:00	Race 2
Friday, 4 October 2002	11:00	Race 3
Saturday, 5 October 2002	10:00	Race 4
Saturday, 5 October 2002	11:00	Race 5
Saturday, 5 October 2002	14:00	Race 6
Monday, 7 October 2002	11:00	Race 7
Tuesday, 8 October 2002	10:00	Race 8
Tuesday, 8 October 2002	11:00	Race 9
Tuesday, 8 October 2002	14:00	Race 10
Wednesday, 9 October 2002	11:00	Race 11

== Results ==
Legend

- DNC — Did not come to the starting area
- DNF — Did not finish

Rank	Athlete	Race											Total
Rank	Athlete	1	2	3	4	5	6	7	8	9	10	11	Total
1st place, gold medalist(s)	Zhou Yuanguo (CHN)	~~(5)~~	1	1	1	2	3	~~(4)~~	3	1	4	1	17
2nd place, silver medalist(s)	Arun Homraruen (THA)	3	2	~~(5)~~	2	1	1	1	2	~~(4)~~	2	3	17
3rd place, bronze medalist(s)	Ikuo Inoue (JPN)	1	~~(5)~~	3	4	4	2	2	1	3	1	~~(5)~~	21
4	Ho Chi Ho (HKG)	2	4	2	3	~~(5)~~	4	3	4	2	~~(5)~~	2	26
5	Song Myung-keun (KOR)	4	3	4	~~(5)~~	3	~~(5)~~	5	5	5	3	4	36
6	Andrew Foo (SIN)	~~(6)~~	6	6	6	6	6	6	6	6	~~(7)~~	6	54
7	Hsin Chin-lung (TPE)	7	7	7	7	7	7	7	7	~~(8)~~; DNF	6	~~(8)~~; DNC	62
