= Sailing at the 2002 Asian Games – Men's Raceboard light =

Men's Raceboard light at the 2002 Asian Games
- Venue: Busan Yachting Center
- Date: 3–9 October 2002
- Competitors: 6 from 6 nations

Medalists
gold medal	Ok Duck-pil	South Korea
silver medal	Gao Chuanwei	China
bronze medal	Chan King Yin	Hong Kong

The men's Raceboard light competition at the 2002 Asian Games in Busan was held from 3 to 9 October 2002.

== Schedule ==
All times are Korea Standard Time (UTC+09:00)

Date	Time	Event
Thursday, 3 October 2002	11:00	Race 1
Thursday, 3 October 2002	14:00	Race 2
Friday, 4 October 2002	11:00	Race 3
Saturday, 5 October 2002	10:00	Race 4
Saturday, 5 October 2002	11:00	Race 5
Saturday, 5 October 2002	14:00	Race 6
Monday, 7 October 2002	11:00	Race 7
Monday, 7 October 2002	14:00	Race 8
Tuesday, 8 October 2002	11:00	Race 9
Tuesday, 8 October 2002	14:00	Race 10
Wednesday, 9 October 2002	11:00	Race 11

== Results ==
Legend

- DNC — Did not come to the starting area
- DNF — Did not finish
- DSQ — Disqualification

Rank	Athlete	Race											Total
Rank	Athlete	1	2	3	4	5	6	7	8	9	10	11	Total
1st place, gold medalist(s)	Ok Duck-pil (KOR)	1	1	2	1	~~(4)~~	2	~~(7)~~; DNF	3	1	2	1	14
2nd place, silver medalist(s)	Gao Chuanwei (CHN)	~~(5)~~	2	1	2	1	1	1	1	2	~~(5)~~	3	14
3rd place, bronze medalist(s)	Chan King Yin (HKG)	2	~~(5)~~	3	~~(6)~~	3	3	2	5	5	1	2	26
4	Ryutaro Oishi (JPN)	3	3	~~(4)~~	3	~~(5)~~	4	3	2	3	3	4	28
5	Phanuthat Ruamsap (THA)	4	4	6	4	2	5	~~(7)~~; DSQ	6	4	~~(7)~~; DNF	7 DNC	42
6	Fadly Faisal Yusuf (INA)	~~(6)~~	6	6	5	6	6	4	4	6	4	~~(7)~~; DNC	47
