= Motokazu Kenjo =

Japanese windsurfer (born 1969)

Personal information
- Nationality: Japanese
- Born: 18 March 1969 (age 57) Fujisawa, Japan

Sport
- Sport: Windsurfing
Medal record
Men's sailing
Representing Japan
Asian Games
Silver medal – second place	1998 Bangkok	Mistral heavy
Bronze medal – third place	2002 Busan	Mistral heavy

Motokazu Kenjo (born 18 March 1969) is a Japanese windsurfer. He competed at the 2000 Summer Olympics and the 2004 Summer Olympics.
