= Zhou Yuanguo =

Chinese windsurfer

Medal record

Men's sailing

Representing China

Asian Games
Gold medal – first place	1998 Bangkok	Raceboard light
Gold medal – first place	2002 Busan	Mistral light

Zhou Yuanguo (born 28 December 1977) is a Chinese windsurfer who competed in the 2000 Summer Olympics and in the 2004 Summer Olympics.
