= Qian Hong (windsurfer) =

Chinese windsurfer

Personal information
- Nationality: Chinese
- Born: 9 November 1971 (age 54) Ningbo, Zhejiang, China
- Height: 172 cm (5 ft 8 in)
- Weight: 70 kg (154 lb)

Sailing career
- Sport: Sailing
Medal record
Men's sailing
Representing China
Asian Games
Gold medal – first place	1994 Hiroshima	Mistral

Qian Hong (Chinese: 錢紅, born 9 November 1971) is a Chinese windsurfer. He finished 12th in the men's Mistral One Design event at the 1996 Summer Olympics.
