= Sailing at the 2002 Asian Games – Men's Raceboard heavy =

Men's Raceboard heavy at the 2002 Asian Games
- Venue: Busan Yachting Center
- Date: 3–9 October 2002
- Competitors: 5 from 5 nations

Medalists
gold medal	Sun Maochun	China
silver medal	Suhaimee Moohammadkasem	Thailand
bronze medal	Hong A-ram	South Korea

The men's Raceboard heavy competition at the 2002 Asian Games in Busan was held from 3 to 9 October 2002.

== Schedule ==
All times are Korea Standard Time (UTC+09:00)

Date	Time	Event
Thursday, 3 October 2002	11:00	Race 1
Thursday, 3 October 2002	14:00	Race 2
Friday, 4 October 2002	11:00	Race 3
Saturday, 5 October 2002	10:00	Race 4
Saturday, 5 October 2002	11:00	Race 5
Saturday, 5 October 2002	14:00	Race 6
Monday, 7 October 2002	11:00	Race 7
Tuesday, 8 October 2002	10:00	Race 8
Tuesday, 8 October 2002	11:00	Race 9
Wednesday, 9 October 2002	10:00	Race 10
Wednesday, 9 October 2002	11:00	Race 11

== Results ==
Rank	Athlete	Race											Total
Rank	Athlete	1	2	3	4	5	6	7	8	9	10	11	Total
1st place, gold medalist(s)	Sun Maochun (CHN)	~~(3)~~	1	1	1	2	2	1	1	~~(3)~~	1	X	10
2nd place, silver medalist(s)	Suhaimee Moohammadkasem (THA)	1	2	~~(3)~~	2	1	1	2	2	~~(4)~~	3	X	14
3rd place, bronze medalist(s)	Hong A-ram (KOR)	2	~~(4)~~	2	3	4	3	3	~~(5)~~	1	2	X	20
4	Kazuya Ueno (JPN)	4	3	4	4	3	4	~~(5)~~	3	~~(5)~~	5	X	30
5	Tang Luen Chun (HKG)	~~(5)~~	~~(5)~~	5	5	5	5	4	4	2	4	X	34
