= Mamoon Sadiq =

Pakistani sailor (born 1965)

Personal information
- Nationality: Pakistani
- Born: 10 April 1965 (age 61)

Sport
- Sport: Sailing
Medal record
Men's sailing
Representing Pakistan
Silver medal – second place	1994 Hiroshima	Enterprise
Silver medal – second place	1998 Bangkok	Enterprise

Mamoon Sadiq (born 10 April 1965) is a Pakistani sailor. He competed at the 1988 Summer Olympics and the 1992 Summer Olympics.

At the 1994 Asian Games, in the Enterprise class event, he partnered with his elder brother, also a naval officer and two-time and then reigning Asian Games champion in the event Munir Sadiq. They won a silver medal.
