= Sailing at the 2002 Asian Games – Men's Mistral heavy =

Men's Mistral heavy at the 2002 Asian Games
- Venue: Busan Yachting Center
- Date: 3–9 October 2002
- Competitors: 6 from 6 nations

Medalists
gold medal	Oka Sulaksana	Indonesia
silver medal	Mo Zehai	China
bronze medal	Motokazu Kenjo	Japan

The men's Mistral heavy competition at the 2002 Asian Games in Busan was held from 3 to 9 October 2002.

== Schedule ==
All times are Korea Standard Time (UTC+09:00)

Date	Time	Event
Thursday, 3 October 2002	11:00	Race 1
Thursday, 3 October 2002	14:00	Race 2
Friday, 4 October 2002	11:00	Race 3
Saturday, 5 October 2002	10:00	Race 4
Saturday, 5 October 2002	11:00	Race 5
Saturday, 5 October 2002	14:00	Race 6
Monday, 7 October 2002	11:00	Race 7
Tuesday, 8 October 2002	10:00	Race 8
Tuesday, 8 October 2002	11:00	Race 9
Tuesday, 8 October 2002	14:00	Race 10
Wednesday, 9 October 2002	11:00	Race 11

== Results ==
Legend

- DNC — Did not come to the starting area
- DNF — Did not finish
- DSQ — Disqualification

Rank	Athlete	Race											Total
Rank	Athlete	1	2	3	4	5	6	7	8	9	10	11	Total
1st place, gold medalist(s)	Oka Sulaksana (INA)	~~(2)~~	1	1	1	1	1	2	2	2	2	~~(7)~~; DNC	13
2nd place, silver medalist(s)	Mo Zehai (CHN)	1	2	2	~~(3)~~	3	~~(7)~~; DSQ	1	1	3	1	2	16
3rd place, bronze medalist(s)	Motokazu Kenjo (JPN)	~~(3)~~	3	3	2	2	2	3	3	1	~~(4)~~	1	20
4	Cho Jun-ho (KOR)	~~(5)~~	4	4	4	4	4	4	4	4	3	~~(7)~~; DNC	35
5	Kriangkrai Sakulfaeng (THA)	4	5	5	5	5	3	5	~~(7)~~; DNF	~~(7)~~; DNF	7 DNF	7 DNC	46
6	Muhammad Tanveer (PAK)	~~(6)~~	6	6	6	6	5	6	5	5	5	~~(7)~~; DNC	50
