= Kim Hye-suk (sailor) =

South Korean sailor (born 1968)

Personal information
- Nationality: South Korean
- Born: 22 December 1968 (age 57)

Sailing career
- Sport: Sailing
Medal record
Women's sailing
Representing South Korea
Asian Games
Bronze medal – third place	1990 Beijing	470

Kim Hye-suk (Korean: 김혜숙, also known as Kim Hye-sook, born 22 December 1968) is a South Korean sailor. She competed in the women's 470 event at the 1988 Summer Olympics.
