= Ok Duck-pil =

South Korean sailor

Personal information
- Full name: Ok Duck-pil
- Nationality: South Korea
- Born: 10 September 1974 (age 52)

Sailing career
- Sport: Sailing
Medal record
Men's sailing
Representing South Korea
Asian Games
Gold medal – first place	2002 Busan	Raceboard light
Bronze medal – third place	1998 Bangkok	Raceboard light

Ok Duck-pil (born 10 September 1974) is a South Korean former windsurfer. He competed at the 1996 Summer Olympics, 2000 Summer Olympics and the 2004 Summer Olympics.
