= Ken Choi (windsurfer) =

Hong Kong windsurfer (born 1961)

Personal information
- Full name: Lee Keung Choi
- Nationality: Hong Konger
- Born: 19 November 1961 (age 64)

Sailing career
- Sport: Sailing
Medal record
Men's sailing
Representing Hong Kong
Asian Games
Bronze medal – third place	1982 Delhi	Windglider

Lee Keung Choi (Chinese: 利強蔡, also known as Ken Choi, born 19 November 1961) is a Hong Kong windsurfer. He competed in the Windglider event at the 1984 Summer Olympics.
