= Arun Homraruen =

Thai windsurfer (born 1970)

Personal information
- Nationality: Thai
- Born: 18 January 1970 (age 56)
- Height: 174 cm (5 ft 9 in)
- Weight: 64 kg (141 lb)

Sailing career
- Sport: Sailing
- Class: Mistral
Medal record
Men's sailing
Representing Thailand
Asian Games
| Bronze medal – third place | 1994 Hiroshima | Mistral |
| Gold medal – first place | 1998 Bangkok | Mistral light |
| Silver medal – second place | 2002 Busan | Mistral light |
| Bronze medal – third place | 2006 Doha | Mistral light |
Asian Beach Games
| Silver medal – second place | 2008 Bali | Mistral heavy |

Arun Homraruen (Thai: อรัญ หอมระรื่น, born 18 January 1970) is a Thai windsurfer. He competed at the 1996 Summer Olympics, the 2000 Summer Olympics, and the 2004 Summer Olympics.
