= Sailing at the 2006 Asian Games – Men's Mistral light =

Men's Mistral light at the 2006 Asian Games
- Venue: Doha Sailing Club
- Date: 5–11 December 2006
- Competitors: 7 from 7 nations

Medalists
gold medal	Chan King Yin	Hong Kong
silver medal	Zeng Xiaohong	China
bronze medal	Arun Homraruen	Thailand

The men's Mistral light competition at the 2006 Asian Games in Doha was held from 5 to 11 December 2006.

== Schedule ==
All times are Arabia Standard Time (UTC+03:00)

Date	Time	Event
Tuesday, 5 December 2006	11:00	Race 1
Tuesday, 5 December 2006	11:00	Race 2
Wednesday, 6 December 2006	11:00	Race 3
Thursday, 7 December 2006	11:00	Race 4
Thursday, 7 December 2006	11:00	Race 5
Friday, 8 December 2006	11:00	Race 6
Friday, 8 December 2006	11:00	Race 7
Monday, 11 December 2006	11:00	Race 8
Monday, 11 December 2006	11:00	Race 9

== Results ==
Legend

- DNF — Did not finish
- DNS — Did not start

Rank	Athlete	Race									Total
Rank	Athlete	1	2	3	4	5	6	7	8	9	Total
1st place, gold medalist(s)	Chan King Yin (HKG)	~~(1)~~	1	1	1	1	1	1	1	1	8
2nd place, silver medalist(s)	Zeng Xiaohong (CHN)	2	2	2	~~(4)~~	2	3	2	2	4	19
3rd place, bronze medalist(s)	Arun Homraruen (THA)	~~(3)~~	3	3	2	3	2	3	3	2	21
4	Kim Joon-sik (KOR)	5	~~(6)~~	4	3	5	5	4	4	3	33
5	Gede Subagiasa (INA)	4	4	5	~~(6)~~	4	4	5	5	6	37
6	German Paz (PHI)	~~(6)~~	5	6	5	6	6	6	6	5	45
7	Upul De Silva (SRI)	7	7	7	~~(8)~~; DNF	8 DNS	7	7	7	8 DNS	58
