= Benedict Tan =

Singaporean sailor

Ben Tan
Personal information
- Nationality: Singaporean
- Born: 21 November 1967 (age 58)

Sport
- Sport: Sailing
Medal record
Sailing
Representing Singapore
Asian Games
Gold medal – first place	1994 Hiroshima	Laser

Benedict Tan Chi Loong (born 21 November 1967) is a former Singaporean sailor and a doctor. He competed in the Laser event at the 1996 Summer Olympics. Tan was the former president of the Singapore Sailing Federation (SSF) from 2010 to 2018.

== Early life ==
Tan was born in a Peranakan family with a younger sibling. He studied in Eunos Primary, Ghim Moh Secondary School, and Hwa Chong Junior College.

== Sailing ==
At the 1994 Asian Games held at Hiroshima, Japan, Tan won the gold medal in the Laser class. In 2010, Tan became the president of the SSF. In 2018, he stepped down from the position.

== Sports ==
In 2018, Tan was elected as one of the Singapore National Olympic Council's vice presidents.
