= Sailing at the 2002 Asian Games – Women's Mistral =

Women's Mistral at the 2002 Asian Games
- Venue: Busan Yachting Center
- Date: 3–9 October 2002
- Competitors: 6 from 6 nations

Medalists
gold medal	Lee Lai Shan	Hong Kong
silver medal	Yin Jian	China
bronze medal	Masako Imai	Japan

The women's Mistral competition at the 2002 Asian Games in Busan was held from 3 to 9 October 2002.

== Schedule ==
All times are Korea Standard Time (UTC+09:00)

Date	Time	Event
Thursday, 3 October 2002	11:00	Race 1
Thursday, 3 October 2002	14:00	Race 2
Friday, 4 October 2002	11:00	Race 3
Saturday, 5 October 2002	10:00	Race 4
Saturday, 5 October 2002	11:00	Race 5
Saturday, 5 October 2002	14:00	Race 6
Monday, 7 October 2002	11:00	Race 7
Monday, 7 October 2002	14:00	Race 8
Tuesday, 8 October 2002	11:00	Race 9
Tuesday, 8 October 2002	14:00	Race 10
Wednesday, 9 October 2002	11:00	Race 11

== Results ==
Legend

- DNC — Did not come to the starting area
- DNF — Did not finish
- RAF — Retired after finishing

Rank	Athlete	Race											Total
Rank	Athlete	1	2	3	4	5	6	7	8	9	10	11	Total
1st place, gold medalist(s)	Lee Lai Shan (HKG)	1	1	2	1	1	1	1	2	1	~~(7)~~; DNF	~~(7)~~; DNC	11
2nd place, silver medalist(s)	Yin Jian (CHN)	3	~~(4)~~	1	2	3	~~(4)~~	4	1	2	1	1	18
3rd place, bronze medalist(s)	Masako Imai (JPN)	2	2	~~(4)~~	~~(4)~~	2	2	3	3	3	2	2	21
4	Napalai Tansai (THA)	4	3	3	3	4	3	2	4	5	~~(7)~~; DNF	~~(7)~~; DNC	31
5	Shin Ji-hyun (KOR)	~~(5)~~	~~(5)~~	5	5	5	5	5	5	4	3	3	40
6	Kuan Hsin (TPE)	~~(6)~~	~~(7)~~; RAF	6	6	6	6	6	6	6	4	4	50
