= Sailing at the Asian Games =

- Governing bodies: WS (World) / ASAF (Asia)
- Events: 14 (men: 6; women: 6; mixed: 2)

Games
- 1951; 1954; 1958; 1962; 1966; 1970; 1974; 1978; 1982; 1986; 1990; 1994; 1998; 2002; 2006; 2010; 2014; 2018; 2022; 2026
- Medalists

Sailing is an Asian Games sport since the 1970 edition and has been held at every edition since, After not being included in 1974.

== Editions ==
Games	Year	Host city	Best nation
VI	1970	Bangkok, Thailand	Japan
VIII	1978	Bangkok, Thailand	Japan
IX	1982	New Delhi, India	Pakistan
X	1986	Seoul, South Korea	South Korea
XI	1990	Beijing, China	Japan
XII	1994	Hiroshima, Japan	China
XIII	1998	Bangkok, Thailand	South Korea
XIV	2002	Busan, South Korea	China
XV	2006	Doha, Qatar	Singapore
XVI	2010	Guangzhou, China	China
XVII	2014	Incheon, South Korea	South Korea
XVIII	2018	Jakarta–Palembang, Indonesia	Japan
XIX	2022	Hangzhou, China	China
XX	2026	Aichi–Nagoya, Japan	Hong Kong

== Events ==
Legend

- M — Men
- O — Open
- W — Women
- X — Mixed

Event	70	78	82	86	90	94	98	02	06	10	14	18	22	26	Years
Kiteboard
Formula Kite													M W		1
Sailboard
Division II				O											1
iQFoil													M W	M W	2
iQFoil Youth														M W	1
Lechner A-390					M W										1
Mistral						M W	W	W	W	M W	M				6
Mistral light							M	M	M						3
Mistral heavy							M	M	M						3
Raceboard light							M	M							2
Raceboard heavy							M	M							2
RS:One											W	X			2
RS:X										M W	M W	M W	M W		4
Windglider			O												1
Dinghy
Europe							W	W							2
Laser 4.7 (ILCA 4)									O			O	M W	M W	4
Laser Radial (ILCA 6)								O	O	O	W	W	W	W	7
Laser (ILCA 7)				O	O	O	M	M	M	M	M	M	M	M	11
OK	O	O	O				O	O							5
Optimist				O	O	O	M W	M W	M W	M W	M W				8
Super Moth	O	O					O								3
420							M W	M W	M W	M W	M W			X	6
470				O	M W	M W	M W	M	M W	M W	M	M W	X	X	11
Enterprise	O	O	O	O	O	O	O	O							8
Fireball	O	O	O												3
Flying Dutchman	O														1
Skiff
29er											W			M W	2
49er												M	M	M	3
49erFX												W	W	W	3
Multihull
Hobie 16									O	O	O				3
Nacra 17													X		1
Keelboat
Beneteau First Class 7.5									O						1
J/80										O	O				2
Total	5	4	4	5	7	7	16	15	14	14	14	10	14	14	143

== Medal table ==
Rank	Nation	Gold	Silver	Bronze	Total
1	China (CHN)	36	21	12	69
2	South Korea (KOR)	23	13	18	54
3	Japan (JPN)	21	23	13	57
4	Singapore (SGP)	16	13	21	50
5	Thailand (THA)	13	16	27	56
6	Hong Kong (HKG)	6	16	7	29
7	Malaysia (MAS)	5	9	7	21
8	Pakistan (PAK)	5	3	2	10
9	Indonesia (INA)	2	1	3	6
10	India (IND)	1	9	16	26
11	Myanmar (MYA)	1	1	4	6
12	Sri Lanka (SRI)	0	1	1	2
13	Chinese Taipei (TPE)	0	1	0	1
13	Oman (OMA)	0	1	0	1
13	Philippines (PHI)	0	1	0	1
13	Qatar (QAT)	0	1	0	1
Totals (16 entries)		129	130	131	390
