= Sailing at the 2010 Asian Games – Laser Radial =

Open Laser Radial at the 2010 Asian Games
- Venue: Shanwei Water Sports Center
- Date: 14–20 November 2010
- Competitors: 12 from 12 nations

Medalists
gold medal	Ha Jee-min	Thailand
silver medal	Hisaki Nagai	Japan
bronze medal	Scott Glen Sydney	Singapore

The open Laser Radial competition at the 2010 Asian Games in Shanwei was held from 14 to 20 November 2010.

== Schedule ==
All times are China Standard Time (UTC+08:00)

Date	Time	Event
Sunday, 14 November 2010	12:00	Race 1
Sunday, 14 November 2010	12:00	Race 2
Monday, 15 November 2010	12:00	Race 3
Monday, 15 November 2010	12:00	Race 4
Tuesday, 16 November 2010	12:00	Race 5
Tuesday, 16 November 2010	12:00	Race 6
Wednesday, 17 November 2010	12:00	Race 7
Wednesday, 17 November 2010	12:00	Race 8
Friday, 19 November 2010	12:00	Race 9
Friday, 19 November 2010	12:00	Race 10
Saturday, 20 November 2010	12:00	Race 11
Saturday, 20 November 2010	12:00	Race 12

== Results ==
Rank	Athlete	Race												Total
Rank	Athlete	1	2	3	4	5	6	7	8	9	10	11	12	Total
1st place, gold medalist(s)	Keerati Bualong (THA)	~~(8)~~	1	5	2	5	3	5	1	2	3	2	4	33
2nd place, silver medalist(s)	Hisaki Nagai (JPN)	5	5	1	1	4	2	~~(7)~~	2	6	2	3	5	36
3rd place, bronze medalist(s)	Scott Glen Sydney (SIN)	4	6	3	3	9	4	1	3	4	~~(10)~~	1	1	39
4	Kim In-sub (KOR)	6	2	2	5	~~(11)~~	7	2	4	5	7	6	2	48
5	Waleed Al-Sharshani (QAT)	2	3	6	4	3	~~(8)~~	4	8	3	5	4	6	48
6	Mohd Romzi Mohamad (MAS)	3	4	4	6	6	5	3	6	~~(9)~~	8	5	3	53
7	Zhang Dongshuang (CHN)	1	~~(10)~~	8	9	1	1	8	9	1	4	10	10	62
8	Rajesh Choudhary (IND)	7	7	7	7	2	6	~~(10)~~	7	8	1	7	9	68
9	Adil Khalid (UAE)	9	8	9	8	7	9	6	5	7	~~(12)~~	9	8	85
10	Najeeb Ullah Khan (PAK)	10	9	10	10	8	10	9	10	~~(11)~~	9	8	7	100
11	Vladimir Solenyi (KGZ)	11	11	11	11	10	~~(12)~~	11	11	10	11	11	11	119
12	Krishan Janaka (SRI)	~~(12)~~	12	12	12	12	11	12	12	12	6	12	12	125
