= Khalid Akhtar (sailor) =

Pakistani sailor (born 1941)

Personal information
- Nationality: Pakistan
- Born: 4 November 1941 (age 83)
- Height: 1.85 m (6 ft 1 in)
- Weight: 85 kg (187 lb)

Sport
- Sport: Sailing

Khalid Akhtar (born 4 November 1941) is a Pakistani sailor. He competed in the 1984 Summer Olympics. Khalid also won a gold medal during the 1982 Asian Games in the OK Dinghy.
