= Munir Sadiq =

Pakistani sailor (born 1955)

Personal information
- Nationality: Pakistani
- Born: 23 February 1955 (age 71)

Sport
- Sport: Sailing
Medal record
Men's sailing
Representing Pakistan
Asian Games
Gold medal – first place	1978 Bangkok	Enterprise
Gold medal – first place	1986 Seoul	Enterprise
Gold medal – first place	1990 Beijing	Enterprise
Silver medal – second place	1994 Hiroshima	Enterprise
Silver medal – second place	1998 Bangkok	Enterprise

Munir Sadiq (born 23 February 1955) is a Pakistani former sailor, a three-time Asian Games gold medalist, winning his first at the 1978 Games in Bangkok. With a silver medal in the open enterprise class at the 1998 Asian Games, Sadiq became the first sailor to win five medals at the Asian Games. He also competed in the 470 event at the 1984 Summer Olympics.

== Early life and education ==
Munir completed his early education from Cadet College, Petaro in 1973.

== Career ==
After graduating from Cadet College Petaro, he joined Pakistan Navy as an officer. After his career he retired as a Captain from the Pakistan Navy, he moved to the UAE to join the UAE's Rashid bin Saeed Al Maktoum Naval College where he coached the cadets and helped them with winning the world championship.

== Sailing career ==
Munir started sailing during his time in the Navy. In 1978, he partnered with Byram Avari to win Pakistan's first sailing gold in the Enterprise class at the Asian Games. He went on to win two more golds with a new partner, Muhammad Zakaullah, winning at the 1986 Asian Games at Seoul, South Korea, and the 1990 Asian Games at Beijing, China. Pakistan's sailing dominance at these Games ended when at the 1994 Hiroshima Games, he was relegated to the silver with a new partner, his younger brother and fellow naval officer, Mamoon Sadiq.

== Family ==
Sadiq is married with two children, a son, Arsalan Sadiq, and daughter Nowayrah Sadiq.

== Award ==
- President's Pride of Performance (1987) by the president of Pakistan and the Tamgha-e-Imtiaz (Military) from Pakistan Navy.
