= Takashi Yamamura (sailor) =

Japanese sailor (born 1940)

Personal information
- Nationality: Japanese
- Born: 19 September 1940 (age 84)

Sport
- Sport: Sailing

Takashi Yamamura (born 19 September 1940) is a Japanese sailor. He competed in the Flying Dutchman event at the 1972 Summer Olympics.
