= Lee Lai Shan =

Hong Kong windsurfer

Lee Lai Shan BBS MBE
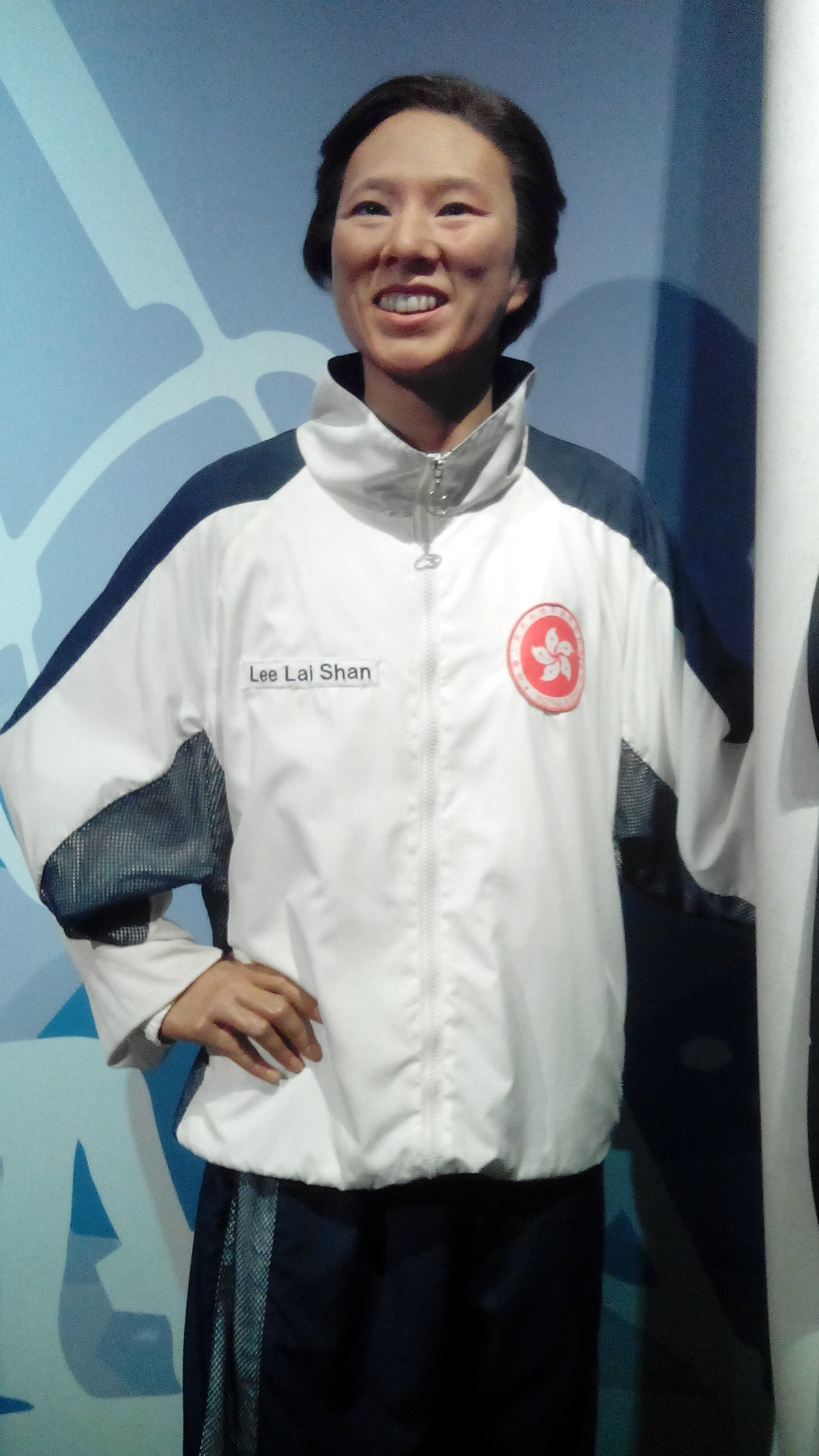
- A wax figure of Lee at Madame Tussauds Hong Kong

Personal information
- Nickname: San San
- Born: 5 September 1970 (age 56) Cheung Chau, British Hong Kong
- Height: 170 cm (5 ft 7 in)
- Weight: 59 kg (130 lb)

Sailing career
- Sport: Sailing
- Club: Windsurfing Association of Hong Kong
- Classes: Mistral, Lechner, Raceboard
Medal record
Women's windsurfing
Representing Hong Kong
Olympic Games
Gold medal – first place	1996 Atlanta	Board (Mistral)
Asian Games
Silver medal – second place	1990 Beijing	Board (Mistral)
Silver medal – second place	1994 Hiroshima	Board (Mistral)
World Championships
Gold medal – first place	1993 Kashiwazaki	Board (Mistral)
Silver medal – second place	1996 Haifa	Board (Mistral)
Bronze medal – third place	1995 Port Elizabeth	Board (Mistral)
Representing Hong Kong (Note: The official name of the team in ISAF is Hong Kong, and named Hong Kong, China during Asian Games and Summer Olympics.)
Asian Games
Gold medal – first place	1998 Bangkok	Board (Mistral)
Gold medal – first place	2002 Busan	Board (Mistral)
World Championships
Gold medal – first place	1997 Fremantle	Board (Mistral)
Gold medal – first place	2001 Varkiza	Board (Mistral)
Silver medal – second place	1998 Brest	Board (Mistral)
Silver medal – second place	2000 Mar del Plata	Board (Mistral)

Lee Lai Shan
- Traditional Chinese: 李麗珊
- Simplified Chinese: 李丽珊
- Cantonese Yale: Léih Laihsāan
Transcriptions
Standard Mandarin
- Hanyu Pinyin: Lǐ Lìshān
- Wade–Giles: Li^{3} Li^{4}-shan^{1}
- IPA: [lì lî.ʂán]
Yue: Cantonese
- Yale Romanization: Léih Laihsāan
- Jyutping: Lei^{5} Lai^{6} saan^{1}
- IPA: [lej˩˧ lɐj˨.san˥]

Lee Lai Shan BBS MBE (Chinese: 李麗珊, born 5 September 1970 in Cheung Chau, Hong Kong) is a former world champion and Olympic gold medal-winning professional windsurfer from Hong Kong. She was the first athlete to win an Olympic medal representing British Hong Kong.

== Sports career ==
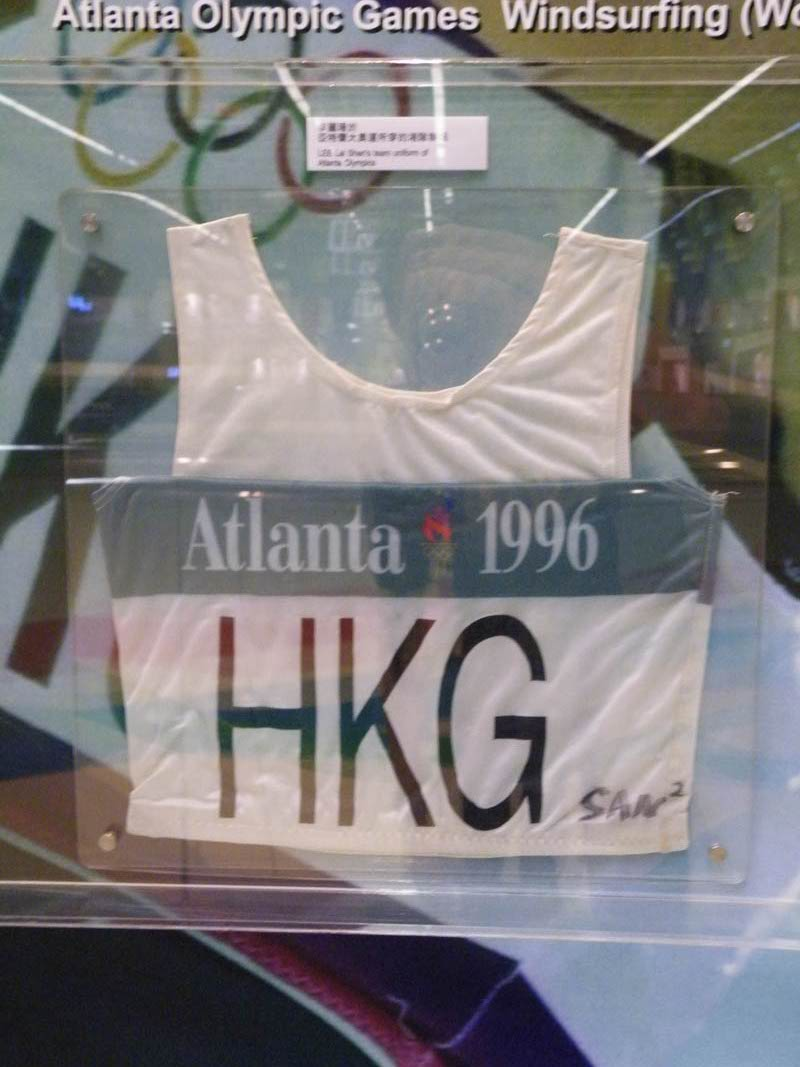
The bib that Lee wore during 1996 Summer Olympics

Lee Lai Shan, popularly known as "San San", was born in Cheung Chau and started windsurfing aged 12. She began to take part in windsurfing competitions at the age of 17 and joined the Hong Kong team at 19. Over the years, Lee won many international competitions, including the first-ever Olympic gold medal for British Hong Kong, in the women's mistral boardsailing class, at the 1996 Summer Olympics and the first champion in the Asian Games representing Hong Kong when it was a British territory.

Hong Kong had never been able to win any medals for as long as it had participated in the Olympic games since 1952 until Lee Lai Shan's victory at Atlanta 1996. Notably, the 1996 Summer Olympics was the last international sporting event that Hong Kong participated in as a British Dependent Territory, making Lee's medal the only medal that the British Hong Kong team won as in 1997 , the handover of Hong Kong happened. It was at that time Lee famously declared to the media: "Hong Kong athletes are not rubbish!"

After the Games she became a student of sports management at Australia's University of Canberra in 1996. She was the first Hong Kong athlete to be awarded an honorary Doctorate in social sciences by The Chinese University of Hong Kong.

Lee became a recipient of the "Ten Outstanding Young Persons Award" and the Bronze Bauhinia Star Award in recognition of her outstanding achievements in the international sports scene. There is a monument resembling a windsurf board and mast erected in her honour near the beachfront at Cheung Chau.

In the 1997 New Year Honours, she was appointed Member of the Order of the British Empire (MBE) for services to sport.

In 2008, she was the first person to carry the Olympic torch in the torch relay leg in Hong Kong. She was also the final torchbearer in the 2008 Summer Olympics sailing opening ceremony at Qingdao International Marina.

=== Participation record ===
- 1990 Beijing Asian Games – 2nd
- 1992 Barcelona Olympic Games – 11th
- 1993 World Championships – 1st
- 1994 Hiroshima Asian Games – 2nd
- 1995 World Championships – 3rd
- 1996 World Championships – 2nd
- 1996 Atlanta Olympic Games – 1st
- 1997 World Championships – 1st
- 1998 Bangkok Asian Games – 1st
- 2000 Sydney Olympic Games – 6th Mistral
- 2001 World Championships – 1st
- 2001 National Games – 1st Mistral
- 2002 Busan Asian Games – 1st
- 2004 Athens Olympic Games – 4th Mistral

== Honors ==
- 1994 – Named Best Athlete of Asia
- 1995 –1996 & 1999–2000 – Named one of Hong Kong Sports Stars of the Year for four times
- 1995 – Selected Best Athlete in Hong Kong for 1994
- 1998 – Voted one of Hong Kong Top Ten Athletes for 1988–1998 by Hong Kong Sports Press Association
- 1999 – Selected one of China's Top Ten Athletes for 1998
- 1999 – Awarded Special Prize in the "Best Athletes of the Century" selection jointly organised by the Chinese Olympic Committee, Henry Fok Foundation and China Sports Press Association

== Personal information ==
Lee married longtime partner Wong Tak-Sum (黃德森) (known in English as Sam Wong), who has also represented Hong Kong internationally in windsurfing, and gave birth to a daughter, Haylie Wong (黃希皚), in August 2005, and to a second daughter, Kallie Wong (黃嘉怡), in August 2007. This was one of the reasons she took a break from competition, though she has not ruled out competing altogether. In 2008, she was involved in the Summer Olympics again when she was one of the presenting team for ATV, in addition to commentating in the sailing event.

In 2006, Lee was featured in a Hang Seng Bank advertisement, in which she said the cost of raising a child in Hong Kong will be HK$4 million (US$510,000). It has caused a slight controversy in Hong Kong as most people do not think it will actually cost that much, and most think that Hang Seng Bank exaggerated the figures.

== See also ==
- Sport in Hong Kong
