= Malik Sulaiman =

Personal information
- Born: Malik Sulaiman; 1968 (age 57–58) Muar, Johor
- Height: 1.75 m (5 ft 9 in)
- Weight: 62 kg (137 lb)

Sport
- Country: Malaysia
- Sport: Badminton

Laser, Dragon, Enterprise, J24, and OK Dinghy, Super Moth class of Yacht Regatta Sailing Sport
- Current ranking: Coaching

Captain (Naval) Malik bin Sulaiman (born 1968) is a Malaysian yachtsman and officer of the Royal Malaysian Navy (RMN). Born in June 1968, at Muar, Johor, Malaysia, he joined the Royal Malaysian Navy (RMN) at the age of 18. He was promoted to the rank of Captain (Capt) on 18 March 2016.

His interest in sailing started at age 17. His debut in racing was made in the Armed Forces National Championship, and he won the competition. He was then 19 years old. The first boat that he has sailed is of Laser class. His primary training session started when he undergone his intern as a warfare electrician at HMAS Nirimba, Sydney, Australia.

In addition, other than competing in Laser class, he has also competed in other classes including Dragon, Enterprise, [J24], and OK Dinghy. Present class that he put his interest is in Platu 25 and IRC racing in Farr 52. He has also been competing in various international sailing competitions and was the silver medalist of Super Moth Class of Regatta event at the Bangkok 1998 XIII Asian Games (ASIAD). Prior to the Games, he has represented the nation in the series of South East Asia Games (SEA Games) including Manila 1991, Singapore 1993 and Chiang Mai 1995. He is also a sailor with high profile and competing actively in Raja Muda Selangor International Regatta Royal, Langkawi International Regatta and Terengganu Monsoon Cup which are held annually coast of Peninsular Malaysia. Currently, he is attached to RMN Yacht Club and has been coaching since 1986 for various classes.

Besides coaching at his yacht club, he also holds the position of National Sailing Technical Director, Malaysian Yachting Association. He is a naval Electronics Engineer specialised in naval weapon and training system. He is a certified Professional Engineer of Board of Engineers Malaysia (BEM) which carries the title of Ir. His academic qualification is in microelectronics. He has completed his Bachelor or Engineering (Hons) in Microelectronics and Master of Science in the same field from Universiti Kebangsaan Malaysia (UKM) (i.e. Malaysian National University) in year 2002 and 2014 respectively. Currently he is pursuing a doctorate degree in the same field at the same university.
