= Dhruv Bhandari (sailor) =

Indian sailor

Personal information
- Nationality: Indian
- Born: 28 December 1959 (age 65)

Sport
- Sport: Sailing

Dhruv Bhandari (born 28 December 1959) is an Indian sailor. He competed in the 470 event at the 1984 Summer Olympics.
