= John Gunawan =

Indonesian sailor

Personal information
- Nationality: Indonesian
- Born: 17 October 1925 Sukabumi, Dutch East Indies

Sport
- Sport: Sailing

John Gunawan (born 17 October 1925) was an Indonesian sailor. He competed in the Flying Dutchman event at the 1968 Summer Olympics.
