= Tatsuya Wakinaga =

Japanese sailor (born 1965)

Personal information
- Nationality: Japanese
- Born: 7 January 1965 (age 60)

Sport
- Sport: Sailing

Tatsuya Wakinaga (born 7 January 1965) is a Japanese sailor. He competed at the 1984 Summer Olympics and the 1988 Summer Olympics.
