= Masayuki Takahashi =

Japanese sailor (born 1962)

Personal information
- Nationality: Japanese
- Born: 23 October 1962
- Died: 27 December 2002 (aged 40)

Sport
- Sport: Sailing

Masayuki Takahashi (高橋 雅之, Takahashi Masayuki; 23 October 1962 - 27 December 2002) is a Japanese sailor. He competed in the men's 470 event at the 1988 Summer Olympics. He died at 11:21 AM on 27 December 2002.
