= Cyrus Cama =

Indian sailor

Personal information
- Nationality: Indian
- Born: 6 November 1971 (age 53)

Sport
- Sport: Sailing

Cyrus Cama (born 6 November 1971) is an Indian sailor. He competed in the men's 470 event at the 1992 Summer Olympics.
