= Tracey Tan =

Singaporean sailor

Personal information
- Nationality: Singaporean
- Born: 16 July 1976 (age 48)

Sport
- Sport: Sailing

Tracey Tan (born 16 July 1976) is a Singaporean sailor. She competed in the Europe event at the 1996 Summer Olympics.
