= Cheung Mei Han =

Hong Kong sailor (born 1965)

Personal information
- Nationality: Hong Konger
- Born: 18 December 1965 (age 59)

Sport
- Sport: Sailing

Cheung Mei Han (Chinese: 張美嫻; born 18 December 1965) is a Hong Kong sailor. She competed in the women's 470 event at the 1996 Summer Olympics.
