= Farokh Tarapore =

Indian sailor

Personal information
- Nationality: Indian
- Born: 3 August 1960 (age 65)

Sport
- Sport: Sailing

Farokh Tarapore (born 3 August 1960) is an Indian sailor. He competed at the 1984 Summer Olympics, the 1988 Summer Olympics, and the 1992 Summer Olympics.

== Awards and accolades ==
=== Asian Games ===
Year	Class of Boats	Event	Venue	Achievement	Ref.
1982	Fireball	IX Asian Games	Bombay	Gold medal	
1986	470	X Asian Games	South Korea	Silver medal	
1990	470	XI Asian Games	China	Bronze medal	
1994	470	XII Asian Games	Japan	Bronze medal	
2010	Match Racing	XVI Asian Games	China	Silver medal	
