= Lalin Jirasinha =

Sri Lankan sailor (born 1958)

Personal information
- Born: 23 June 1958 (age 68)

Sport
- Sport: Sailing
Medal record
Men's sailing
Representing Sri Lanka
1998 Asian Games
Bronze medal – third place	Sailing	Enterprise

Lalin Jirasinha (born 23 June 1958) is a former Sri Lankan male sailor. He competed at the Summer Olympics on two occasions - in 1984 Summer Olympics held in Los Angeles at the age of 26 and later after 16 years, again he participated in the event in 2000 Summer Olympics which was held in Sydney at the age of 42. During the 1984 Summer Olympics, he was the flagbearer for Sri Lanka.

Jirasinha has also participated in the Asian Games in 1998 and in the 2002 Asian Games. At the 1998 Asian Games, he won the bronze medal in the sailing - Enterprise event.
