= Sailing at the 1982 Asian Games =

- Venue: Arabian Sea
- Dates: 21–27 November 1982

Sailing (as Yachting) was contested at the 1982 Asian Games at the Arabian Sea near Mumbai, India from 21 November to 27 November.

OK Dinghy, Enterprise, Fireball and Windglider classes were held in the competition.

== Medalists ==
| Event | Gold | Silver | Bronze |
|---|---|---|---|
| Windglider | Tsunemoto Ishiwata; Japan | Policarpio Ortega; Philippines | Ken Choi; Hong Kong |
| OK | Khalid Akhtar; Pakistan | Naoki Nagatsu; Japan | C. S. Pradipak; India |
| Enterprise | Pakistan; Byram D. Avari; Goshpi Avari | India; Jeejee Unwalla; Fali Unwalla | Japan; Hiroshi Inoue; Hideo Baba |
| Fireball | India; Farokh Tarapore; Zarir Karanjia | Japan; Nobuhiko Yagi; Toshio Tanaka | Thailand; Panasarn Hasdin; Surapol Tippavongse |

== Medal table ==
| Rank | Nation | Gold | Silver | Bronze | Total |
|---|---|---|---|---|---|
| 1 | Pakistan (PAK) | 2 | 0 | 0 | 2 |
| 2 | Japan (JPN) | 1 | 2 | 1 | 4 |
| 3 | India (IND) | 1 | 1 | 1 | 3 |
| 4 | Philippines (PHI) | 0 | 1 | 0 | 1 |
| 5 | Hong Kong (HKG) | 0 | 0 | 1 | 1 |
| 5 | Thailand (THA) | 0 | 0 | 1 | 1 |
| Totals (6 entries) | | 4 | 4 | 4 | 12 |
