= Tan Wearn Haw =

Singaporean sailor

Tan Wearn Haw (born 12 November 1978) is the Head of National Youth Sports Institute and former Olympic sailor. Tan attended Victoria School and Raffles Junior College. He was the Sportsboy of the Year for 1992 and 1995, and a Public Service Commission (PSC) scholar, graduating from Imperial College, London with a master's degree in Aeronautical Engineering.

Tan was the first Singaporean to win the Asian and multiple ASEAN Optimist Championships. He subsequently progressed through the various youth classes to the Olympic 470 class.

He competed in the Sydney Olympic Games in 2000, and won a bronze medal for Singapore at the 2002 Asian Games in Korea. In 2007, he was based in Valencia, Spain, for two years, competing in the Louis Vuitton Cup for Team China, qualifying series to sailing's most prestigious event, the America's Cup.

Tan became the youngest person to lead a national sports association in Singapore when he became the CEO of the Singapore Sailing Federation at the age of 31 in 2011. His main task is to achieve an Olympic gold medal in sailing for Singapore.
