= Soli Contractor =

Indian sailor

Personal information
- Full name: Sohrab Janshed Contractor
- Nationality: Indian
- Born: 27 July 1938 (age 86)

Sport
- Sport: Sailing

Sohrab Janshed "Soli" Contractor (born 27 July 1938) is an Indian sailor. He competed in the Flying Dutchman event at the 1972 Summer Olympics.
