= Kazuoki Matsuyama =

Japanese sailor (born 1942)

Personal information
- Nationality: Japanese
- Born: 8 January 1942 (age 83)

Sport
- Sport: Sailing

Kazuoki Matsuyama (松山 和興, Matsuyama Kazuoki; born 8 January 1942) is a Japanese sailor. He competed in the Finn event at the 1972 Summer Olympics.
