= Eiichiro Hamazaki =

Japanese sailor (born 1973)

Personal information
- Nationality: Japanese
- Born: 28 June 1973 (age 51); Tokyo, Japan

Sport
- Sport: Sailing

Eiichiro Hamazaki (born 28 June 1973) is a Japanese sailor. He competed in the men's 470 event at the 2000 Summer Olympics.
