= Chen Xiumei =

Chinese sailor (born 1966)

Personal information
- Nationality: Chinese
- Born: 21 February 1966 (age 59)

Sport
- Sport: Sailing

Chen Xiumei (born 21 February 1966) is a Chinese sailor. She competed in the women's 470 event at the 1988 Summer Olympics.
