= Colin Ng =

Singaporean yachtsman

Medal record

Representing Singapore

Men's sailing

Asian Games
Gold medal – first place	1998 Bangkok	International 420

Southeast Asian Games
Gold medal – first place	1993 Singapore	International 420
Gold medal – first place	1997 Jakarta	International 420
Gold medal – first place	2015 Singapore	Keelboat Fleet racing
Silver medal – second place	2015 Singapore	Keelboat Match Racing
Silver medal – second place	2019 Philippines	Keelboat Match racing
Silver medal – second place	2019 Philippines	Keelboat fleet racing

Ng Wee Tai Colin is a Singaporean yachtsman best known for winning a gold medal in the 13th Asian Games held in Bangkok, Thailand.

Ng partnered Siew Shaw Her in the 13th Asian Games to win the International 420 class. In 1993, won Gold with Anthony Kiong in the 420 class at the SEA Games. In 1997, he partnered with Khor Teck Lin to win the International 420 class in the 1997 Southeast Asian Games held in Jakarta, Indonesia. In 2015, he sailed to a Gold and Silver medal at the 2015 SEA Games in the Men's keelboat. To date - 1 Asian Games Gold, 3 SEA Games Gold medals and 3 Silver medal. He was inducted in the Singapore Sports Hall of Fame together with Siew in 1999.
