= Rachot Kanjanavanit =

Thai sailor

- Born: 5 August 1924; Songkhla, Thailand
- Died: 1996 (aged 71–72)
- Occupations: Engineer, professor, sailor

Rachot Kanjanavanit (Thai: รชฎ กาญจนะวณิชย์, RTGS: Rachot Kanchanawanit; 5 August 1924 – 1996) was a Thai civil engineer. He was a professor at the Faculty of Engineering of Chulalongkorn University, and served as president of the Engineering Institute of Thailand. His firm, R.K.V. Engineering Consultant, was responsible for the construction of the MBK Center shopping mall, Central Chidlom department store, the factory of Siam City Cement, and Map Ta Phut Industrial Port. He was also a sailor, and competed at the 1964 Summer Olympics, the 1968 Summer Olympics, and the 1972 Summer Olympics.
