= Shen Sheng =

Chinese sailor

Shen Sheng (born January 17, 1979, in Wuhan, Hubei) is a male Chinese sports sailor who has competed with Team China at the 2008 Summer Olympics.

== Major performances ==
- 1999/2001/2004 National Championships – 1st Laser class;
- 2000/2006/2007 National Championships – 2nd/3rd/3rd Laser class;
- 2001 National Games – 1st Laser class;
- 2002 National Championships/Asian Games – 1st Laser Radial;
- 2006 Asian Games – 6th Laser class
