= Saburo Sato =

Japanese sailor (born 1960)

Personal information
- Nationality: Japanese
- Born: 18 December 1960 (age 64)

Sport
- Sport: Sailing

Saburo Sato (佐藤 三郎, Satō Saburō; born 18 December 1960) is a Japanese sailor. He competed at the 1984 Summer Olympics and the 1988 Summer Olympics.
