= Veerasit Puangnak =

Thai sailor (born 1966)

Personal information
- Nationality: Thai
- Born: 10 August 1966 (age 59)

Sport
- Sport: Sailing

Veerasit Puangnak (born 10 August 1966) is a Thai sailor. He competed in the Laser event at the 2000 Summer Olympics.
