= Charles Lim =

Singaporean contemporary artist

Charles Lim Yi Yong (林育荣)
- Born: 10 July 1973 (age 52); Singapore
- Education: BFA (Central Saint Martins School of Art and Design, 2001)
- Known for: Film, video art, installation art, sound art, drawing, photography
- Movement: Contemporary art
- Website: https://www.seastate.sg/

Charles Lim Yi Yong (Chinese: 林育荣; pinyin: Lín Yùróng; born 10 July 1973) is a Singaporean contemporary artist and former Olympic sailor. Lim's work as an artist spans film, installation, sound, text, drawing, and photography. He co-founded the seminal Singapore-based internet art collective, tsunamii.net. In 2015, he represented Singapore at their national pavilion in the prestigious Venice Biennale, with the exhibition SEA STATE.

Lim was a former national sailor who competed in the 1996 Summer Olympics representing Singapore in the men's 470 event, and Team China in the 2007 America's Cup.

== Career ==
In 2005, Lim began developing a body of work titled SEA STATE, which explores the political, biophysical and psychic contours of Singapore through the lenses of the sea. The artist's practice involves extensive research about Singapore's maritime history and its geography, examining the impact of mankind on the physical environment, and the relationships between nature and technology, land and sea. For the installation SEA STATE 9: proclamation garden (2019), Lim replaced the original ornamental landscaping in the National Gallery Singapore's roof garden with 30 species of plants foraged from reclaimed areas. This was intended to draw attention to life that was disrupted and re-emerged elsewhere, and unsettle neat settler-colonizer tropes. This work recalibrates the habitual behaviours of museum staff and the public, asking visitors to accept the coexistence of fauna other than themselves.
