= Li Dongying (sailor) =

Chinese sailor

Li Dongying (born 14 February 1978) is a Chinese sailor who competed in the 2000 Summer Olympics.
