= Kenji Nakamura (sailor) =

Japanese sailor (born 1964)

Personal information
- Nationality: Japanese
- Born: 18 February 1964 (age 61)

Sport
- Sport: Sailing

Kenji Nakamura (中村 健次, Nakamura Kenji; born 18 February 1964) is a Japanese sailor. He competed at the 1988, 1996, 2000 and the 2004 Summer Olympics.
