= Masato Takaki =

Japanese sailor (born 1966)

Personal information
- Nationality: Japanese
- Born: 4 August 1966 (age 58)

Sport
- Sport: Sailing

Masato Takaki (高木 正人, Takaki Masato; born 4 August 1966) is a Japanese sailor. He competed at the 1996 Summer Olympics and the 2004 Summer Olympics.
