= Siew Shaw Her =

Singaporean sailor

Personal information
- Nationality: Singapore
- Born: 17 July 1957 (age 69) Singapore

Sailing career
- Sport: Sailing
Medal record
Sailing
Asian Games
Gold medal – first place	Bangkok 1998	420
Silver medal – second place	Japan 1994	470
Southeast Asian Games
Gold medal – first place	Singapore 1983	470
Gold medal – first place	Indonesia 1987	470
Gold medal – first place	Malaysia 1989	470
Gold medal – first place	Singapore 1993	470
Gold medal – first place	Thailand 1995	470
Gold medal – first place	Indonesia 1997	470
Silver medal – second place	Singapore 1985	Fireball

Siew Shaw Her (Chinese: 萧邵和; pinyin: Xiāo Shàohè; born 17 July 1957) is a former Singaporean sailor who started his sailing career in 1974. Siew won a gold medal at the Asian Games and six gold medals at the Southeast Asian Games. He also represented Singapore in the Summer Olympics.

Siew won his first gold medal at the 1983 Southeast Asian Games in the 470 Men's Dinghy race. In the 1985 Southeast Asian Games, he competed in the Fireball class as a crew to Tan Tee Suan and won a silver medal. Siew went back to the 470 class and went on to win five consecutive gold medals at the Southeast Asian Games from 1987 to 1997, with different sailing crew.

Siew achieved 5th place in the 1982 Asian Games, a silver medal in the 470 class at the 1994 Asian Games and finally the gold medal in the 420 class at the 1998 Asian Games

Siew also represented Singapore at three consecutive Summer Olympics from 1988 to 1996. At the 1988 Summer Olympics's 470 Men's Dinghy race, Siew and his teammate Joseph Chan capsized and were thrown into the rough water. They were injured and unable to right their damaged boat. Canadian sailor Lawrence Lemieux, competing in his Finn class heat, broke away and sailed to rescue them. Chan and Siew were rescued and transferred onto an official patrol boat.

He went on to compete in the same class at the 1992 Olympics and 1996 Olympics without much success.

For his sporting achievements, Siew was awarded the Sportsman of the Year title in 1999. He was also ranked 30th in a list of Singapore's 50 Greatest Athletes of the Century by The Straits Times in 1999.

== Personal life ==
Siew has a daughter, Savannah Siew, who is also a national sailor, and two sons, Sebastian Siew and Sylvester Siew, who holds a PUB scholarship.
