= Cao Xiaobo =

Chinese sailor (born 1967)

Cao Xiaobo (Chinese: 曹晓波; pinyin: Cáo Xiǎobō, born 25 May 1967) is a Chinese sailor who competed in the 1996 Summer Olympics. He is from Qingdao.
