= Busan Yachting Center =

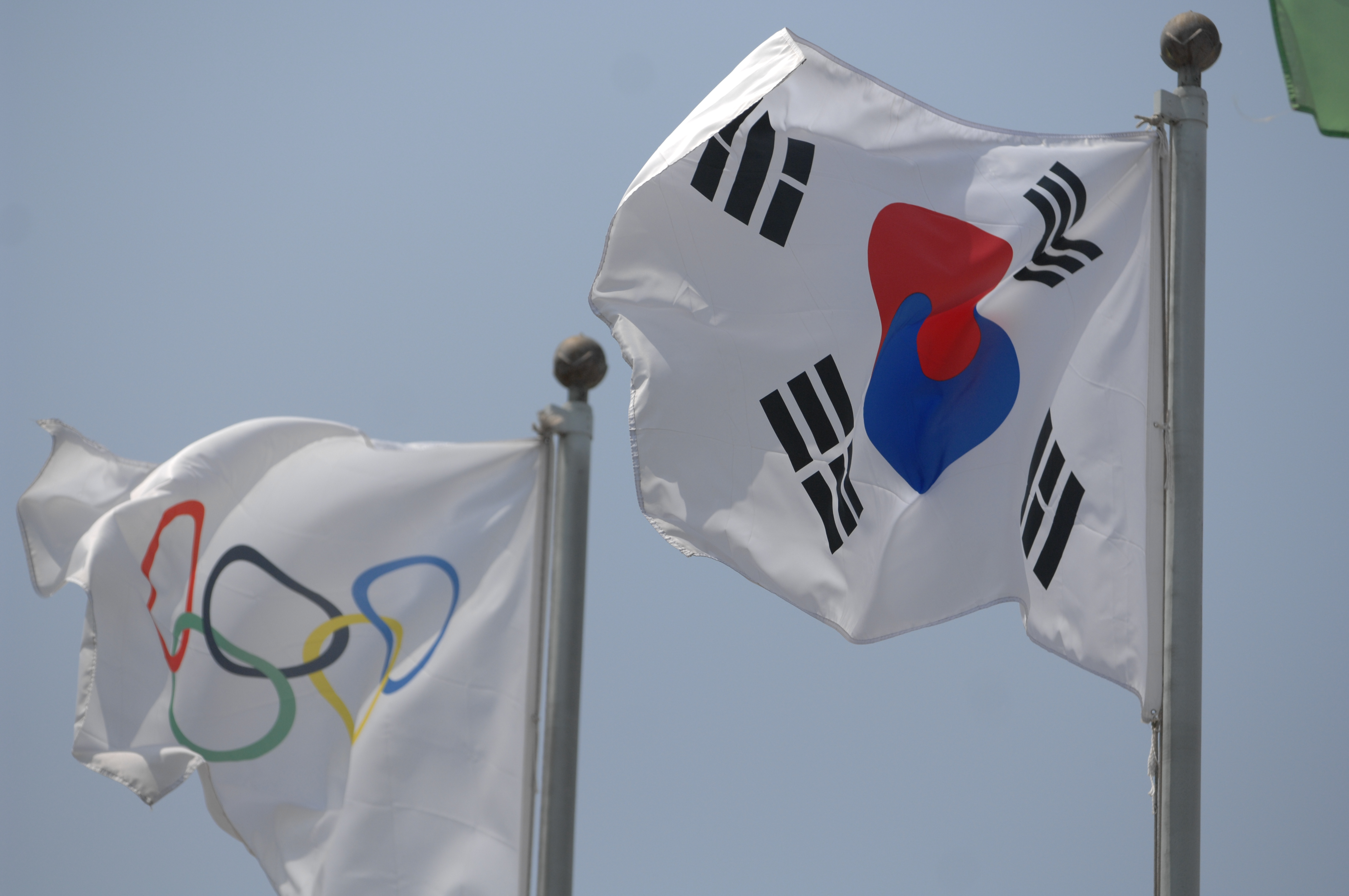
- Flag

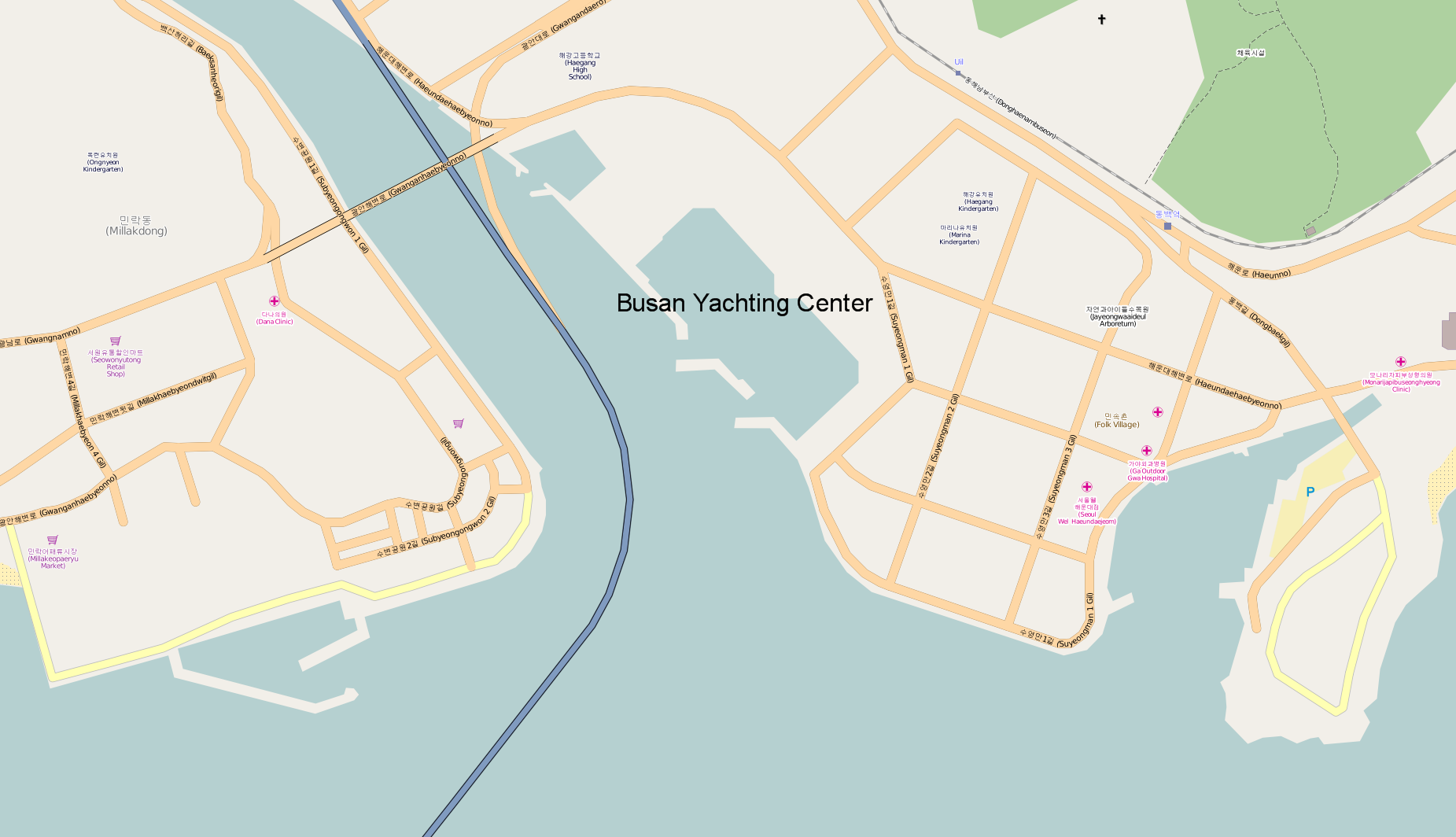
- Coordinates: 35°9′32″N 129°8′18″E
- Country: South Korea
- Region: Yeongnam
- Established: Between June 1983 and May 1986
- Website: http://visitkorea.or.kr/enu/SI/SI_EN_3_1_1_1.jsp?cid=266887

The Busan Yachting Center (Korean: 수영만 요트경기장) is a yachting center in Busan, South Korea. Constructed between June 1983 and May 1986 after receiving permission from the Busan Port Authority in early 1982, the venue hosted the sailing competitions for the 1988 Summer Olympics in Seoul.
