= Sailing at the 2006 Asian Games =

- Venue: Doha Sailing Club
- Dates: 5–13 December 2006
- Competitors: 168 from 19 nations

Sailing was contested at the 2006 Asian Games from December 5 to December 13. Competition took place in various sailing disciplines at the Doha Sailing Club.

== Schedule ==
●	Round	●	Last round	P	Preliminary	F	Finals

Event↓/Date →	5th Tue	6th Wed	7th Thu	8th Fri	9th Sat	10th Sun	11th Mon	12th Tue	13th Wed
Men's Mistral light	●●	●	●●	●●			●●		
Men's Mistral heavy	●●	●	●●	●●			●●		
Men's Laser	●●	●	●●●	●●●		●	●	●	
Boys' Optimist	●	●	●●●	●●●		●●	●	●	
Boys' 420	●		●●●	●●●		●●●	●		●
Men's 470	●	●	●●●	●●●		●●	●		●
Women's Mistral	●●	●	●●	●●			●●		
Girls' Optimist	●	●	●●●	●●●		●●	●	●	
Girls' 420	●		●●●	●●●		●●●	●		●
Women's 470	●	●	●●●	●●●		●●	●		●
Open Laser 4.7	●	●	●●●	●●●		●	●●	●	
Open Laser Radial	●	●	●●●	●●●		●	●●	●	
Open Hobie 16	●●	●	●●●	●●●			●●		●
Open match racing		P	P	P		P	P	P	F

== Medalists ==
=== Men ===
Event	Gold	Silver	Bronze
Mistral light	Chan King Yin; Hong Kong	Zeng Xiaohong; China	Arun Homraruen; Thailand
Mistral heavy	Yao Xinhao; China	Ho Chi Ho; Hong Kong	Oka Sulaksana; Indonesia
Laser	Maximilian Soh; Singapore	Yoichi Iijima; Japan	Kim Ho-kon; South Korea
Optimist	Ni Wei; China	Navee Thamsoontorn; Thailand	Sean Lee; Singapore
420	Singapore; Justin Liu; Sherman Cheng	Japan; Shibuki Iitsuka; Shingen Furuya	Myanmar; Nay La Kyaw; Min Min
470	South Korea; Kim Dae-young; Jung Sung-ahn	Singapore; Xu Yuan Zhen; Terence Koh	Japan; Kan Yamada; Kenichi Nakamura

=== Women ===
Event	Gold	Silver	Bronze
Mistral	Chen Lina; China	Chan Wai Kei; Hong Kong	Napalai Tansai; Thailand
Optimist	Rufina Tan; Malaysia	Haruka Komiya; Japan	Benjamas Poonpat; Thailand
420	Singapore; Sarah Tan; Lim Tze Ting	Japan; Yumi Takahashi; Kae Tsugaya	Myanmar; Su Sandar Wai; Zin April Aung
470	Japan; Ai Kondo; Naoko Kamata	Singapore; Toh Liying; Elizabeth Tan	China; Yu Chunyan; Wen Yimei

=== Open ===
Event	Gold	Silver	Bronze
Laser 4.7	Colin Cheng; Singapore	Waleed Al-Sharshani; Qatar	Nurul Elia Anuar; Malaysia
Laser Radial	Xu Lijia; China	Koh Seng Leong; Singapore	Rajesh Choudhary; India
Hobie 16	Thailand; Damrongsak Vongtim; Sakda Vongtim	South Korea; Park Kyu-tae; Sung Chang-il	Singapore; Melcolm Huang; Chung Pei Quan
Match racing	Singapore; Ivan Tan; Justin Wong; Renfred Tay; Teo Wee Chin; Roy Tay	India; Sanjeev Chauhan; Girdhari Yadav; Nitin Mongia; Mahesh Ramchandran	South Korea; Yoon Cheul; Kim Tae-jung; Kim Hyeong-tae; Kim Sang-suk

== Medal table ==
Rank	Nation	Gold	Silver	Bronze	Total
1	Singapore (SIN)	5	3	2	10
2	China (CHN)	4	1	1	6
3	Japan (JPN)	1	4	1	6
4	Hong Kong (HKG)	1	2	0	3
5	Thailand (THA)	1	1	3	5
6	South Korea (KOR)	1	1	2	4
7	Malaysia (MAS)	1	0	1	2
8	India (IND)	0	1	1	2
9	Qatar (QAT)	0	1	0	1
10	Myanmar (MYA)	0	0	2	2
11	Indonesia (INA)	0	0	1	1
Totals (11 entries)		14	14	14	42

== Participating nations ==
A total of 168 athletes from 19 nations competed in sailing at the 2006 Asian Games:

- Bahrain (9)
- China (13)
- Chinese Taipei (1)
- Hong Kong (7)
- India (9)
- Indonesia (2)
- Japan (12)
- Kazakhstan (4)
- Kuwait (6)
- Malaysia (7)
- Myanmar (8)
- Oman (3)
- Pakistan (13)
- Philippines (4)
- Qatar (14)
- Singapore (20)
- South Korea (18)
- Sri Lanka (6)
- Thailand (12)
