= Bodybuilding at the 2006 Asian Games =

- Venue: Al-Dana Banquet Hall
- Dates: 8–9 December 2006
- Competitors: 94 from 25 nations

Bodybuilding was an event which took place at the 2006 Asian Games in Doha, Qatar on December 8 and 9. The competition included only men's events for eight different weight categories. All events were held at the Al-Dana Banquet Hall. Qatar finished first in the medal table by winning two goals.

== Schedule ==
P	Preliminary	F	Final

Event↓/Date →	8th Fri		9th Sat	
Men's 60 kg	P	F		
Men's 65 kg	P	F		
Men's 70 kg	P	F		
Men's 75 kg	P	F		
Men's 80 kg			P	F
Men's 85 kg			P	F
Men's 90 kg			P	F
Men's +90 kg			P	F

== Medalists ==
Event	Gold	Silver	Bronze
60 kg	Qian Jicheng; China	Phạm Văn Mách; Vietnam	Ibrahim Sihat; Singapore
65 kg	Mohammed Salem Al-Zahmi; United Arab Emirates	Sazali Abdul Samad; Malaysia	Chong Ka Lap; Macau
70 kg	Simon Chua; Singapore	Syafrizaldy; Indonesia	Kenji Kondo; Japan
75 kg	Chan Yun To; Hong Kong	Yoshihiro Yano; Japan	Mohd Ismail Muhammad; Singapore
80 kg	Sitthi Charoenrith; Thailand	Mohamed Sabah; Bahrain	Lee Do-hee; South Korea
85 kg	Kamal El-Gargni; Qatar	Fadhel Moussa; Bahrain	Kang Kyung-won; South Korea
90 kg	Ali Tabrizi; Qatar	Hassan Al-Saka; Syria	Lam Man Shing; Hong Kong
+90 kg	Tareq Al-Farsani; Bahrain	Jassim Abdulla; Qatar	Ahmad Al-Saafeen; Jordan

== Medal table ==
Rank	Nation	Gold	Silver	Bronze	Total
1	Qatar (QAT)	2	1	0	3
2	Bahrain (BRN)	1	2	0	3
3	Singapore (SIN)	1	0	2	3
4	Hong Kong (HKG)	1	0	1	2
5	China (CHN)	1	0	0	1
5	Thailand (THA)	1	0	0	1
5	United Arab Emirates (UAE)	1	0	0	1
8	Japan (JPN)	0	1	1	2
9	Indonesia (INA)	0	1	0	1
9	Malaysia (MAS)	0	1	0	1
9	Syria (SYR)	0	1	0	1
9	Vietnam (VIE)	0	1	0	1
13	South Korea (KOR)	0	0	2	2
14	Jordan (JOR)	0	0	1	1
14	Macau (MAC)	0	0	1	1
Totals (15 entries)		8	8	8	24

== Participating nations ==
A total of 94 athletes from 25 nations competed in bodybuilding at the 2006 Asian Games:

- Afghanistan (4)
- Bahrain (8)
- China (4)
- Chinese Taipei (2)
- Hong Kong (4)
- Indonesia (2)
- Iran (8)
- Iraq (5)
- Japan (4)
- Jordan (1)
- Kazakhstan (2)
- Lebanon (1)
- Macau (4)
- Malaysia (2)
- Maldives (3)
- Nepal (1)
- Oman (4)
- Philippines (2)
- Qatar (7)
- Singapore (6)
- South Korea (7)
- Syria (2)
- Thailand (3)
- United Arab Emirates (4)
- Vietnam (4)
