= Cue sports at the 2006 Asian Games – Men's English billiards singles =

Men's English billiards singles at the 2006 Asian Games
- Venue: Al-Sadd Multi-Purpose Hall
- Dates: 4–5 December 2006
- Competitors: 20 from 11 nations

Medalists
gold medal	Pankaj Advani	India
silver medal	Ashok Shandilya	India
bronze medal	Peter Gilchrist	Singapore

The men's English billiards singles tournament at the 2006 Asian Games in Doha took place from 4 December to 5 December at Al-Sadd Multi-Purpose Hall.

== Schedule ==
All times are Arabia Standard Time (UTC+03:00)

Date	Time	Event
Monday, 4 December 2006	10:00	Round of 32
Monday, 4 December 2006	10:00	Round of 16
Monday, 4 December 2006	20:35	Quarterfinals
Tuesday, 5 December 2006	10:00	Semifinals
Tuesday, 5 December 2006	16:00	Finals

== Results ==
=== Finals ===
Gold medal match
	Pankaj Advani (IND)	3
3	Ashok Shandilya (IND)	1

Bronze medal match
4	Aung San Oo (MYA)	1
	Peter Gilchrist (SIN)	3

=== Top half ===
Round of 32
Nguyễn Thanh Long (VIE)	3
Mohanna Al-Obaidly (QAT)	0
Imran Shahzad (PAK)	3
Park Seung-chil (KOR)	1

Round of 16
1	Praprut Chaithanasakun (THA)	3
Mohammed Omar Ashiq (BRN)	0
Pankaj Advani (IND)	3
Nguyễn Thanh Long (VIE)	2
Imran Shahzad (PAK)	3
Alan Puan (SIN)	2
Khobala Sirisoma (SRI)	0
4	Aung San Oo (MYA)	3

Quarterfinals
1	Praprut Chaithanasakun (THA)	0
Pankaj Advani (IND)	3
Imran Shahzad (PAK)	0
4	Aung San Oo (MYA)	3

Semifinals
Pankaj Advani (IND)	3
4	Aung San Oo (MYA)	1

=== Bottom half ===
Round of 32
Lee Wan-soo (KOR)	3
Ali Al-Obaidly (QAT)	1
Farhan Mirza (PAK)	0
Nguyễn Thanh Bình (VIE)	3

Round of 16
3	Ashok Shandilya (IND)	3
Ahmed Ghulam Muanedi (BRN)	0
Reynaldo Grandea (PHI)	3
Lee Wan-soo (KOR)	1
Nguyễn Thanh Bình (VIE)	0
Thawat Sujaritthurakarn (THA)	3
Peter Gilchrist (SIN)	3
2	Kyaw Oo (MYA)	2

Quarterfinals
3	Ashok Shandilya (IND)	3
Reynaldo Grandea (PHI)	0
Thawat Sujaritthurakarn (THA)	1
Peter Gilchrist (SIN)	3

Semifinals
3	Ashok Shandilya (IND)	3
Peter Gilchrist (SIN)	0
