= Weightlifting at the 2006 Asian Games – Women's 48 kg =

Women's 48 kg at the 2006 Asian Games
- Venue: Al-Dana Banquet Hall
- Date: 2 December 2006
- Competitors: 9 from 8 nations

Medalists
gold medal	Wang Mingjuan	China
silver medal	Pensiri Laosirikul	Thailand
bronze medal	Thongyim Bunphithak	Thailand

The women's 48 kilograms event at the 2006 Asian Games took place on December 2, 2006 at Al-Dana Banquet Hall in Doha.

== Schedule ==
All times are Arabia Standard Time (UTC+03:00)

Date	Time	Event
Saturday, 2 December 2006	13:00	Group A

== Records ==
Prior to this competition, the existing world, Asian and Games records were as follows.

World Record	Snatch	Yang Lian (CHN)	98 kg	Santo Domingo, Dominican Rep.	1 October 2006
World Record	Clean & Jerk	Yang Lian (CHN)	119 kg	Santo Domingo, Dominican Rep.	1 October 2006
World Record	Total	Yang Lian (CHN)	217 kg	Santo Domingo, Dominican Rep.	1 October 2006
Asian Record	Snatch	Yang Lian (CHN)	98 kg	Santo Domingo, Dominican Rep.	1 October 2006
Asian Record	Clean & Jerk	Yang Lian (CHN)	119 kg	Santo Domingo, Dominican Rep.	1 October 2006
Asian Record	Total	Yang Lian (CHN)	217 kg	Santo Domingo, Dominican Rep.	1 October 2006
Games Record	Snatch	Kay Thi Win (MYA)	90 kg	Busan, South Korea	30 September 2002
Games Record	Clean & Jerk	Raema Lisa Rumbewas (INA)	110 kg	Busan, South Korea	30 September 2002
Games Record	Total	Kay Thi Win (MYA)	200 kg	Busan, South Korea	30 September 2002

== Results ==
Rank	Athlete	Group	Body weight	Snatch (kg)				Clean & Jerk (kg)				Total
Rank	Athlete	Group	Body weight	1	2	3	Result	1	2	3	Result	Total
1st place, gold medalist(s)	Wang Mingjuan (CHN)	A	47.96	88	90	~~92~~	90	112	116	~~118~~	116	206
2nd place, silver medalist(s)	Pensiri Laosirikul (THA)	A	47.43	80	~~85~~	85	85	~~107~~	107	~~115~~	107	192
3rd place, bronze medalist(s)	Thongyim Bunphithak (THA)	A	47.51	82	~~87~~	~~87~~	82	106	109	~~112~~	109	191
4	Paek Un-hui (PRK)	A	47.94	80	~~82~~	~~83~~	80	100	104	107	107	187
5	Hiromi Miyake (JPN)	A	47.74	78	80	~~82~~	80	~~105~~	~~105~~	105	105	185
6	Nguyễn Bích Hà (VIE)	A	47.83	77	80	82	82	96	101	103	103	185
7	Asmahan Elayyan (JOR)	A	47.37	65	~~70~~	~~70~~	65	~~85~~	~~85~~	85	85	150
8	Gongoryn Otgontuyaa (MGL)	A	47.65	56	59	~~60~~	59	69	~~76~~	~~76~~	69	128
DQ	Kyi Kyi Than (MYA)	A	47.74	83	~~88~~	~~88~~	83	105	~~108~~	~~108~~	105	~~188~~

- Kyi Kyi Than of Myanmar originally finished 4th, but was disqualified after she tested positive for Diuretic.

== New records ==
The following records were established during the competition.

Clean & Jerk	116	Wang Mingjuan (CHN)	GR
Total	202	Wang Mingjuan (CHN)	GR
Total	206	Wang Mingjuan (CHN)	GR
