= Bowling at the 2006 Asian Games – Men's masters =

Men's masters at the 2006 Asian Games
- Venue: Qatar Bowling Center
- Date: 9–10 December 2006
- Competitors: 16 from 11 nations

Medalists
gold medal	Jo Nam-yi	South Korea
silver medal	Remy Ong	Singapore
bronze medal	Choi Bok-eum	South Korea

The men's masters competition at the 2006 Asian Games in Doha was held on 9 and 10 December 2006 at Qatar Bowling Centre.

The Masters event comprises the top 16 bowlers (maximum two per country) from the all-events competition.

== Schedule ==
All times are Arabia Standard Time (UTC+03:00)

Date	Time	Event
Saturday, 9 December 2006	09:00	First block
Sunday, 10 December 2006	12:30	Second block
Sunday, 10 December 2006	17:30	2nd/3rd place
Sunday, 10 December 2006	18:00	1st/2nd place

== Results ==
Legend

- DNF — Did not finish

=== Preliminary ===
Rank	Athlete	Game																Total
Rank	Athlete	1	2	3	4	5	6	7	8	9	10	11	12	13	14	15	16	Total
1	Jo Nam-yi (KOR)	265; 10	201; 10	196; 10	237; 10	220; 0	236; 10	247; 10	189; 0	252; 10	246; 10	255; 10	227; 10	230; 10	257; 10	216; 0	201; 10	3805
2	Remy Ong (SIN)	220; 10	179; 0	194; 0	181; 0	238; 10	240; 10	266; 10	213; 0	255; 10	247; 10	248; 0	228; 10	258; 0	233; 10	225; 0	253; 10	3768
3	Choi Bok-eum (KOR)	167; 0	240; 10	225; 10	189; 0	256; 10	215; 10	199; 0	277; 10	234; 10	239; 10	253; 10	279; 10	257; 10	183; 0	214; 0	162; 0	3689
4	Wu Siu Hong (HKG)	193; 0	227; 10	195; 0	279; 10	187; 0	222; 10	213; 0	212; 10	279; 10	203; 0	214; 0	244; 0	270; 10	196; 0	218; 10	237; 10	3669
5	Alex Liew (MAS)	193; 10	181; 0	188; 0	232; 0	213; 10	218; 0	246; 10	237; 10	234; 10	207; 0	235; 10	258; 10	204; 10	256; 10	232; 10	227; 0	3661
6	Somjed Kusonphithak (THA)	224; 10	209; 10	193; 0	246; 10	192; 0	201; 10	216; 10	170; 0	224; 0	216; 10	237; 10	288; 10	202; 0	277; 10	254; 10	195; 0	3644
7	Ryan Leonard Lalisang (INA)	243; 10	217; 0	194; 0	191; 0	213; 10	207; 10	191; 0	238; 10	212; 0	205; 0	246; 10	279; 10	237; 0	194; 0	259; 10	217; 10	3623
8	Toshihiko Takahashi (JPN)	246; 10	227; 10	199; 10	216; 10	223; 10	193; 10	223; 10	179; 0	254; 0	171; 0	204; 0	245; 10	228; 10	237; 0	222; 10	226; 10	3603
9	Hassan Al-Shaikh (KSA)	255; 10	180; 0	176; 10	225; 10	216; 0	266; 10	220; 10	199; 10	237; 0	201; 0	236; 0	228; 0	201; 0	215; 0	236; 10	225; 0	3586
10	Yannaphon Larpapharat (THA)	180; 0	218; 0	206; 10	224; 10	236; 10	191; 0	197; 0	256; 10	278; 10	191; 10	243; 10	195; 0	168; 0	225; 10	225; 0	256; 10	3579
11	Lee Yu Wen (SIN)	165; 0	247; 10	204; 0	235; 10	233; 0	179; 0	180; 0	198; 0	249; 10	217; 10	256; 10	215; 0	218; 10	245; 10	259; 10	185; 0	3565
12	Saeed Al-Hajri (QAT)	237; 10	249; 10	209; 10	194; 0	211; 10	204; 0	195; 10	215; 10	197; 0	228; 0	193; 0	204; 0	181; 0	223; 0	216; 10	245; 10	3481
13	Markwin Tee (PHI)	176; 0	215; 0	172; 0	257; 0	228; 10	177; 0	257; 10	203; 10	242; 10	213; 0	201; 0	224; 0	211; 10	226; 10	216; 0	201; 0	3479
14	Bader Al-Shaikh (KSA)	163; 0	242; 10	233; 10	200; 10	189; 0	218; 0	166; 0	195; 0	221; 0	223; 10	258; 10	299; 10	191; 0	202; 0	211; 0	191; 0	3462
15	Aaron Kong (MAS)	180; 0	204; 0	223; 10	190; 0	200; 0	200; 0	205; 0	161; 0	186; 0	226; 10	203; 0	222; 0	244; 10	249; 10	213; 0	235; 10	3391
—	Nayef Eqab (UAE)	179; 0	208; 0	202; 10	214; 10	160; 0	223; 10	202; 0	177; 0									DNF

=== Stepladder finals ===
2nd/3rd place			1st/2nd place
			1	Jo Nam-yi (KOR)	221	234	455
2	Remy Ong (SIN)	259	2	Remy Ong (SIN)	199	212	411
3	Choi Bok-eum (KOR)	195
