= 2010 World Professional Billiards Championship =

The 2010 World Professional Billiards Championship, the top international professional competition in English billiards, was held between 27 and 31 October 2010 at the Northern Snooker Centre in Leeds, England. The 20 players were divided into four groups of five, with the top two in each group advancing into the knock-out round.

Mike Russell won his 10th World Professional Billiards Championship title after beating Dhruv Sitwala 1738–1204 in the final.

== Group round ==
=== Group A ===
Player	Score	Player	Score
(India) Pankaj Advani	1150	(India) Sushrut Pandia	167
(India) Devendra Joshi	280	(India) Sourav Kothari	728
(India) Pankaj Advani	684	(England) Martin Goodwill	637
(India) Devendra Joshi	839	(India) Sushrut Pandia	299
(India) Sourav Kothari	718	(England) Martin Goodwill	262
(India) Pankaj Advani	818	(India) Devendra Joshi	469
(India) Sourav Kothari	1152	(India) Sushrut Pandia	189
(India) Devendra Joshi	493	(England) Martin Goodwill	500
(India) Pankaj Advani	965	(India) Sourav Kothari	457
(India) Sushrut Pandia	239	(England) Martin Goodwill	906

Rank	Player	P	W	L	F	A
1	(India) Pankaj Advani	4	4	0	3617	1730
2	(India) Sourav Kothari	4	3	1	3055	1696
3	(England) Martin Goodwill	4	1	3	2305	2134
4	(India) Devendra Joshi	4	1	3	2081	2345
5	(India) Sushrut Pandia	4	0	4	894	4047

=== Group B ===
Player	Score	Player	Score
(India) Rupesh Shah	702	(England) Bem French	239
(India) Geet Sethi	781	(India) Siddharth Parikh	397
(India) Rupesh Shah	618	(England) Matthew Sutton	414
(India) Geet Sethi	1223	(England) Bem French	186
(India) Siddharth Parikh	964	(England) Bem French	201
(India) Rupesh Shah	441	(India) Geet Sethi	461
(India) Siddharth Parikh	351	(England) Matthew Sutton	385
(India) Geet Sethi	1199	(England) Matthew Sutton	223
(India) Rupesh Shah	352	(India) Siddharth Parikh	416
(England) Bem French	242	(England) Matthew Sutton	705

Rank	Player	P	W	L	F	A
1	(India) Geet Sethi	4	4	0	3664	1247
2	(India) Rupesh Shah	4	2	2	2113	1530
3	(India) Siddharth Parikh	4	2	2	2128	1719
4	(England) Matthew Sutton	4	2	2	1727	2410
5	(England) Bem French	4	0	4	868	3594

=== Group C ===
Player	Score	Player	Score
(India) Dhruv Sitwala	283	(India) Ashok Shandilya	504
(England) David Causier	868	(England) Mark Hirst	289
(India) Dhruv Sitwala	533	(England) Phil Mumford	480
(England) David Causier	911	(India) Ashok Shandilya	391
(England) Mark Hirst	347	(England) Phil Mumford	599
(India) Dhruv Sitwala	593	(England) David Causier	498
(England) Mark Hirst	560	(India) Ashok Shandilya	386
(England) David Causier	1150	(England) Phil Mumford	289
(India) Dhruv Sitwala	430	(England) Mark Hirst	429
(India) Ashok Shandilya	566	(England) Phil Mumford	554

Rank	Player	P	W	L	F	A
1	(England) David Causier	4	3	1	3427	1562
2	(India) Dhruv Sitwala	4	3	1	1839	1911
3	(India) Ashok Shandilya	4	2	2	1847	2308
4	(England) Mark Hirst	4	1	3	1625	2283
5	(England) Phil Mumford	4	1	3	1922	2596

=== Group D ===
Player	Score	Player	Score
(Qatar) Mike Russell	1070	(England) Ian Williamson	262
(Singapore) Peter Gilchrist	616	(England) Gary Rogers	394
(Qatar) Mike Russell	413	(England) Robert Marshall	614
(Singapore) Peter Gilchrist	961	(England) Ian Williamson	275
(England) Gary Rogers	148	(England) Robert Marshall	730
(Qatar) Mike Russell	719	(Singapore) Peter Gilchrist	393
(England) Gary Rogers	368	(England) Ian Williamson	277
(Singapore) Peter Gilchrist	674	(England) Robert Marshall	422
(Qatar) Mike Russell	820	(England) Gary Rogers	338
(England) Ian Williamson	375	(England) Robert Marshall	321

Rank	Player	P	W	L	F	A
1	(Qatar) Mike Russell	4	3	1	3022	1607
2	(Singapore) Peter Gilchrist	4	3	1	2644	1810
3	(England) Robert Marshall	4	2	2	2087	1610
4	(England) Gary Rogers	4	1	3	1248	2443
5	(England) Ian Williamson	4	1	3	1189	2720

== Knock-out round ==
Quarterfinals; 2½ hours		Semifinals; 4 hours		Final; 5 hours
(India) Pankaj Advani	608
(India) Dhruv Sitwala	723	(India) Dhruv Sitwala	980
(Singapore) Peter Gilchrist	445	(India) Geet Sethi	979
(India) Geet Sethi	969			(India) Dhruv Sitwala	1204
(England) David Causier	1356			(Qatar) Mike Russell	1738
(India) Sourav Kothari	499	(England) David Causier	1279
(India) Rupesh Shah	496	(Qatar) Mike Russell	1525
(Qatar) Mike Russell	995
