= Sailing at the 2006 Asian Games – Boys' 420 =

Boys' 420 at the 2006 Asian Games
- Venue: Doha Sailing Club
- Date: 5–13 December 2006
- Competitors: 16 from 8 nations

Medalists
gold medal	Justin Liu; Sherman Cheng	Singapore
silver medal	Shibuki Iitsuka; Shingen Furuya	Japan
bronze medal	Nay La Kyaw; Min Min	Myanmar

The boys' 420 competition at the 2006 Asian Games in Doha was held from 5 to 13 December 2006. It was an under-19 event and sailors born in or after 1988 were eligible to compete.

== Schedule ==
All times are Arabia Standard Time (UTC+03:00)

Date	Time	Event
Tuesday, 5 December 2006	11:00	Race 1
Thursday, 7 December 2006	11:00	Race 2
Thursday, 7 December 2006	11:00	Race 3
Thursday, 7 December 2006	11:00	Race 4
Friday, 8 December 2006	11:00	Race 5
Friday, 8 December 2006	11:00	Race 6
Friday, 8 December 2006	11:00	Race 7
Sunday, 10 December 2006	11:00	Race 8
Sunday, 10 December 2006	11:00	Race 9
Sunday, 10 December 2006	11:00	Race 10
Monday, 11 December 2006	11:00	Race 11
Wednesday, 13 December 2006	11:00	Race 12

== Results ==
Legend

- DNC — Did not come to the starting area
- OCS — On course side

Rank	Team	Race												Total
Rank	Team	1	2	3	4	5	6	7	8	9	10	11	12	Total
1st place, gold medalist(s)	Singapore (SIN); Justin Liu; Sherman Cheng	4	1	2	4	2	1	1	1	1	1	~~(5)~~	4	22
2nd place, silver medalist(s)	Japan (JPN); Shibuki Iitsuka; Shingen Furuya	5	2	1	1	1	~~(9)~~; OCS	4	5	3	2	3	3	30
3rd place, bronze medalist(s)	Myanmar (MYA); Nay La Kyaw; Min Min	1	4	4	5	4	2	~~(9)~~; OCS	4	5	5	2	2	38
4	Hong Kong (HKG); Isamu Kendal Sakai; Bryan Tse	6	6	5	2	6	~~(9)~~; OCS	9 OCS	3	2	3	6	1	49
5	Malaysia (MAS); Hazwan Hazim Dermawan; Lim Chern Wei	2	~~(7)~~	6	6	7	3	5	6	4	4	1	5	49
6	South Korea (KOR); Kim Jang-nam; Kim Jong-seung	7	3	3	3	3	~~(9)~~; OCS	2	2	6	6	9 OCS	7	51
7	China (CHN); Yang Shuai; Zhou Bolin	3	5	~~(9)~~; OCS	7	5	4	3	7	7	7	4	6	58
8	Qatar (QAT); Hussain Al-Sharshani; Mohammed Al-Zaini	8	8	7	~~(9)~~; OCS	8	9 OCS	6	8	8	8	7	9 DNC	86
