= 2006 Asian Games opening ceremony =

Event held at Khalifa International Stadium, Qatar

- Part of 2006 Asian Games
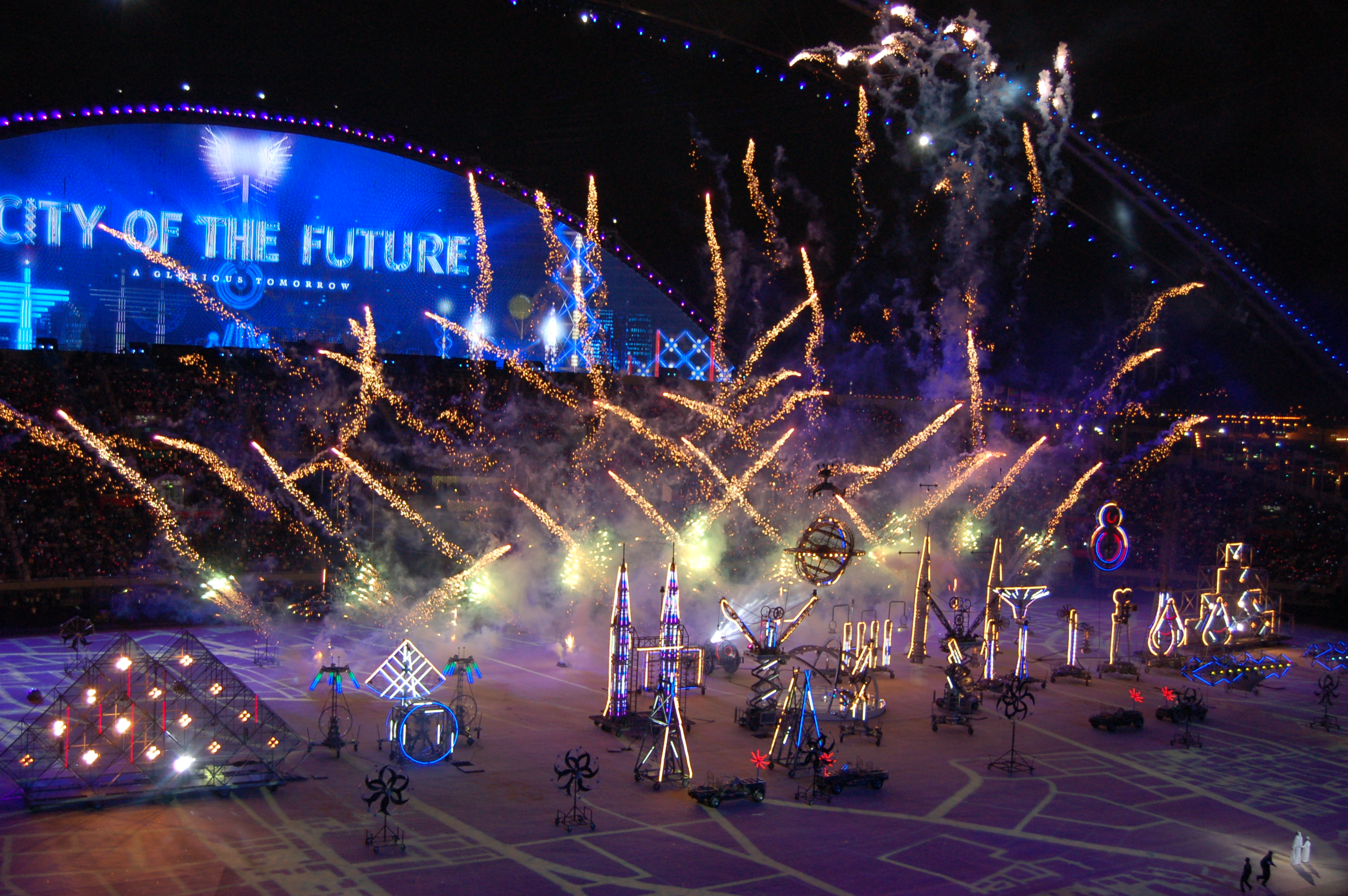
- Performers at the opening ceremony
- Date: 1 December 2006
- Time: 20:00 – 22:05 AST (UTC+3)
- Venue: Khalifa International Stadium
- Location: Al-Rayyan, Qatar

The 2006 Asian Games opening ceremony was held on 1 December at the multi-purpose Khalifa International Stadium. The opening ceremony was described by the media to be one of the most breathtaking and technologically spectacular multi-sport event ceremonies in the history of the Asian Games (and also one of the most expensive) at that time. It was created and produced by David Atkins (who had previously helmed the 2000 Summer Olympics opening ceremony in Sydney, Australia) and was filmed and broadcast live by International Games Broadcast Services' (IGBS) precursor Doha Asian Games Broadcast Services (DAGBS). 10 composers from Qatar, Lebanon, Egypt, Singapore, Japan, India, South Korea, Germany and Australia composed the score for the ceremonies.

== Proceedings ==
=== Pre-ceremonial events ===
Prior to the opening ceremony, Qatari youngsters spent 10 minutes creating a traditional Qatari Al Sadu carpet on the stadium floor. This was followed by youngsters from Aspire Academy, who raced around the stadium chasing Orry, the Games’ mascot to represent Qatar’s bid to make the country the sports capital of the Middle East.

=== Preface ===
The ceremony started with the arrival of Emir of Qatar Sheikh Hamad bin Khalifa Al Thani, OCA chairman Sheikh Ahmed Al-Fahad and their wives into the stadium.

=== Countdown ===
After that, a 10-second countdown projection on the stadium floor began to signal the start of the opening ceremony. A group of 2,300 young people then used flares to form the national flag followed by a message consisting of the Arabic and English greetings "As-salamu alaykum" (Arabic: ٱلسَّلَامُ عَلَيْكُمْ, "peace be upon you").

=== Main event ===
A group of children, led by Nasser Khaled Al Kubaisi, then sang Qatar's national anthem to accompany the raising of the national flag by Qatari Armed Forces personnel.

A cultural performance that told the story of the "Seeker" and his journey to Asia was presented, which began with footage that displayed an astronomical zoom from an atom to the universe, the Milky Way, the Solar System and Earth, before stopping at the games' host nation, Qatar. The main protagonist was played by local actor Adel Al Ansari.

The artistic segment revolved around a man known as the "Seeker" who was born and lived in the nation of Qatar, where the people of the desert and the people of the sea lived harmoniously together. The people of the desert are experts in poetry while the people of the sea are experts in fishing for pearls named "tears of the moon". As a boy, he dreamed of following a falcon that leads him up to a tower and finds an astrolabe, an instrument used to make astronomical measurements. When the boy grew up into a young man, he left behind his family and his love before he proceeded to begin his adventure in a pearling boat, searching for pearls with a few pearl divers from his homeland, guided only by the stars and his astrolabe. One day, he encountered a fierce storm at sea that overturned the pearling boats of the pearl divers that followed him, causing most of them to get lost and never return to their families. He later encountered a terrifying and colossal half-human half-amphibian sea jinn named Abu Darya (meaning in Arabic "Lord of the Sea"), who threatened to destroy his ship and devour him. Fortunately, he was rescued by a giant falcon who defeated the jinn, landing him on safe ground where he continued his path to Asia and discovered its colourful history and cultures. The Angkor Wat, the Taj Mahal, the Temple of Heaven and Borobudur were among the important landmarks he passed. The Seeker was also treated to a multicultural presentation that displayed the cultures of different Asian countries such as China, Japan, India, Indonesia, Kazakhstan and Thailand. Many people in the continent came to greet him, sending him gifts such as gold, silk, spices and incense. Meanwhile, back at the Seeker’s homeland, his love was in despair, waiting for his arrival. With his Asian brothers helping him in his way back to his homeland, the Seeker safely made it back to his love, and invited all of Asia to celebrate their wedding as guests. To honour his guests, the Seeker presented them a troupe of horsemen that put on a special performance. Years later, the Seeker had a son. He showed him the Arab world's contributions to modern science in the past, the present and the future, Qatar's natural resources and the country’s vision for the future.

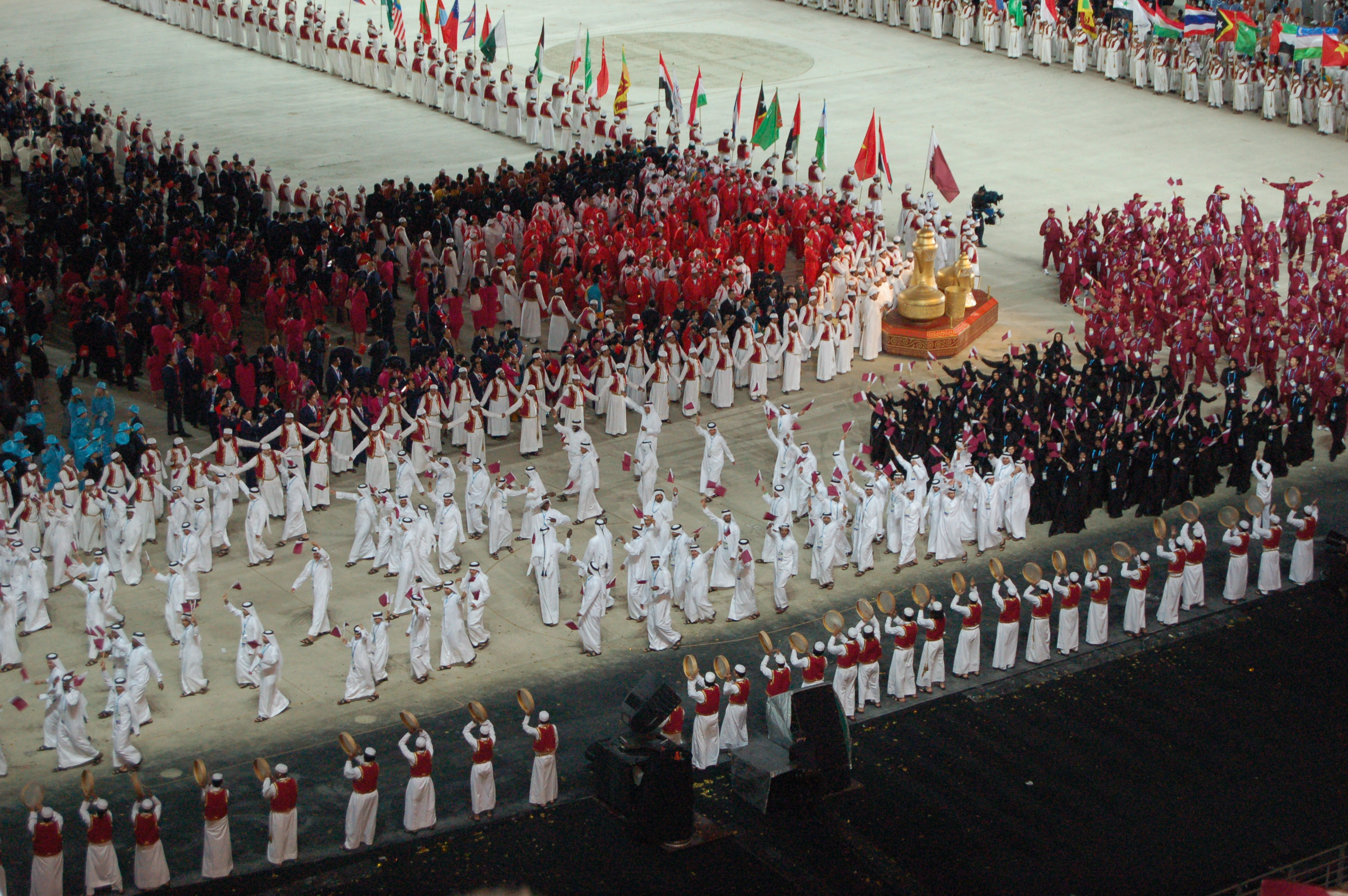
Delegates from Host Qatar enters the stadium.

Delegates from the 45 countries and regions of Asia entered the stadium after Hong Kong artist Jacky Cheung sang "Together Now". As host nation, Qatar enters the stadium last. For the fifth time after the 2000 Summer Olympics, 2002 Asian Games, 2004 Summer Olympics, and the 2006 Winter Olympics, North Korea and South Korea jointly entered the stadium under Korean Unification Flag. Once all the delegates gathered inside the stadium, India's Bollywood star Sunidhi Chauhan sang "Reach Out" written by award winning songwriters Paul Begaud and Vanessa Corish. Hundreds of performers brought out dove sculptures and formed the word "peace." Then, the games' organising committee chairman Sheikh Tamim bin Hamad Al Thani and Olympic Council of Asia chairman Sheikh Ahmad Al-Fahad Al-Sabah gave their respective speeches and Emir of Qatar Sheikh Hamad bin Khalifa Al Thani declared the games open. Qatar’s armed forces personnel later raised the flag of the Olympic Council of Asia (OCA), the games' governing body which was brought in by representatives of Reach Out To Asia (ROTA), a Qatari charity organisation. The flag bore the old logo of the Olympic Council of Asia, which was replaced by a new and current version the following day at the Flag Square of the Asian Games Athletes village. Mubarak Eid Belal (a Qatari volleyball player) took the athletes' oath, while Abdullah Al Balushi (a Qatari football referee) took the judges' oath.

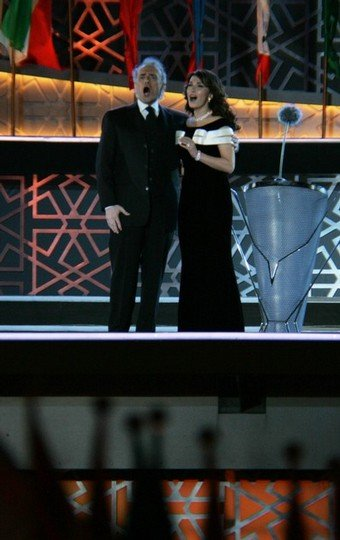
Majida El Roumi performing "Light The Way" with José Carreras during the opening ceremony

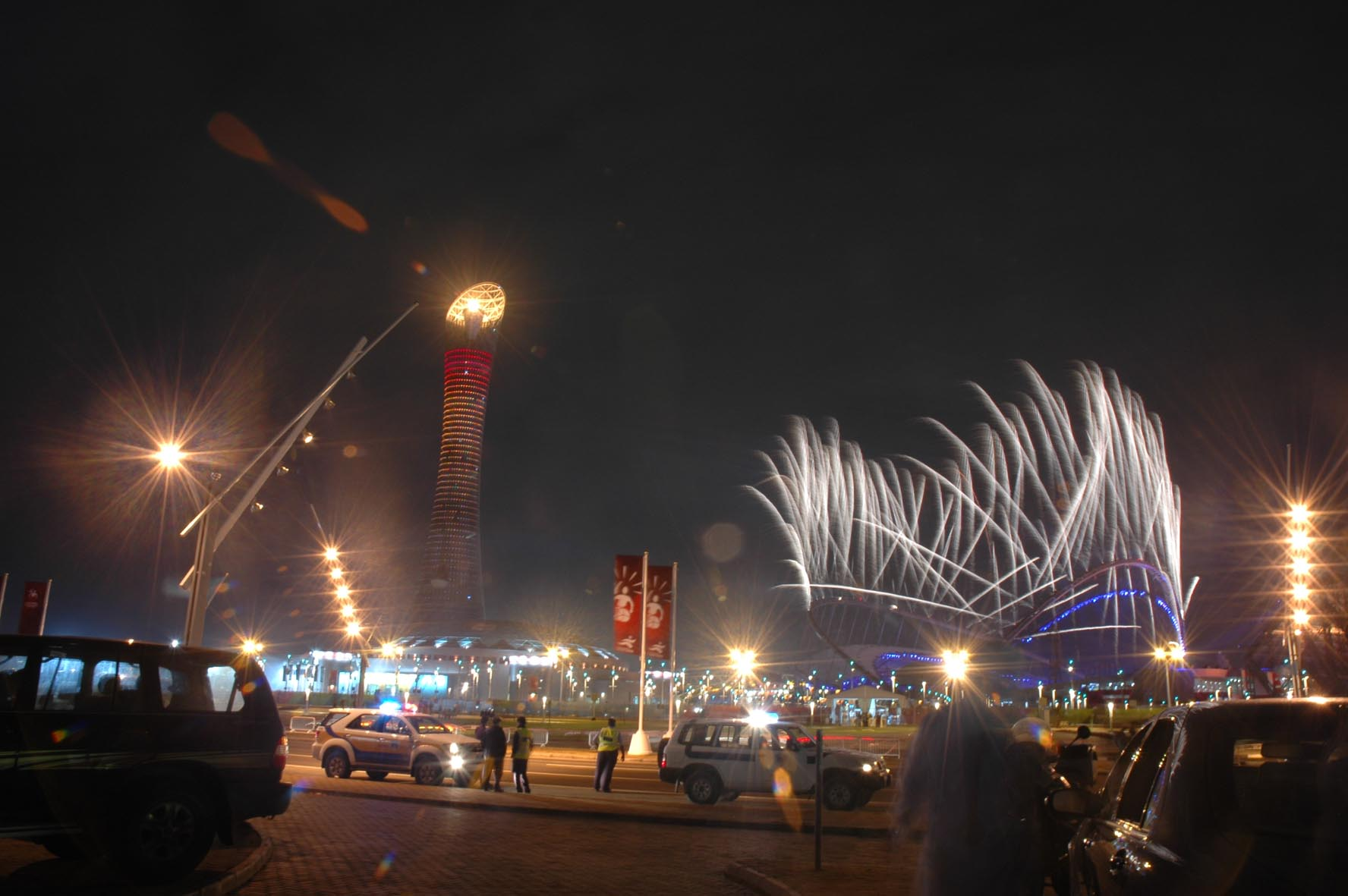
Fireworks display at the opening ceremony outside the stadium

Before the torch relay section, Lebanon's Majida El Roumi and Spanish tenor José Carreras performed "Light the Way". The torch was relayed into the stadium by bowler Salem Bu Sharbak, volleyball player Mubarak Mustafa, shooter Nasser Al-Atiyya, Mohamed Suleiman, footballer Mansoor Muftah Sheikh and Talal Mansour. Mohammed Bin Hamad Al-Thani, son of the emir and captain of the Qatar equestrian endurance team, rode his horse up the stairs to the top of the stadium to light up the giant cauldron that took the form of a giant astrolabe. The flame was transferred electronically to the Aspire Tower just outside the stadium, and fireworks soon went off, signalling the start of the 2006 Asian Games. The horse nearly slipped in the process and a clip of this incident made it onto the official broadcast.

== Parade of Nations ==
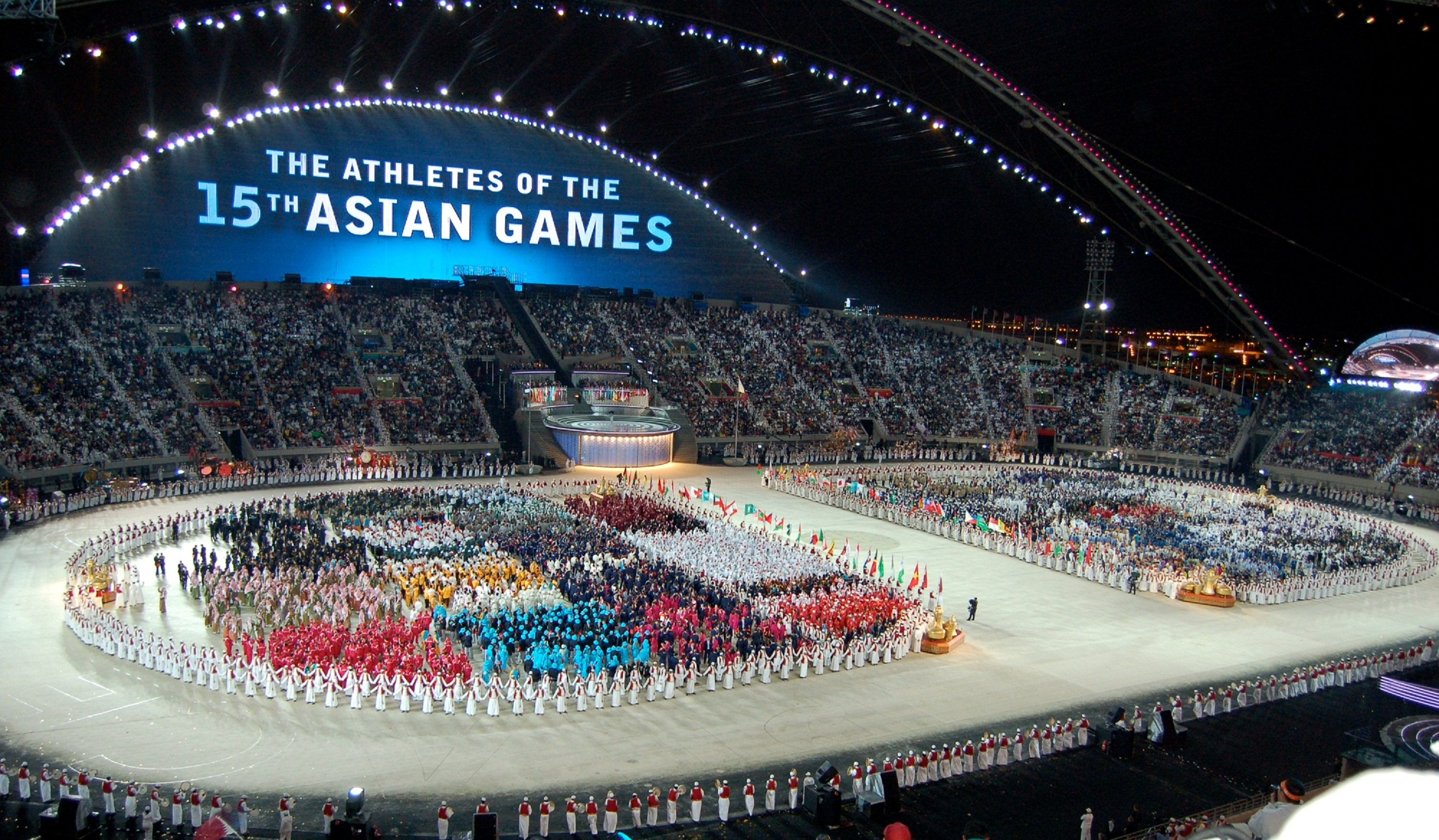
Athletes of the 2006 Asian Games.

All 45 contingents participated in the parade in English alphabetical order, from Afghanistan to Yemen, with host Qatar marching last. The traditional music of several Asian regions accompanied the athletes as they marched into the stadium, performed by international dancers on parade floats.

Whilst most countries entered under their short names, a few entered under alternative names, sometimes due to political disputes. Taiwan (Republic of China) entered with the compromised name and flag of "Chinese Taipei" under T so that they did not enter together with conflicting "China", which entered under C.

North Korea and South Korea marched together under the Korean Unification Flag, but competed separately.

While the placards were displayed only in English, the participating countries were announced in English and Arabic.

Order	Nation	Placard Name	Arabic name	Romanized	Flag bearer	Sport
1	Afghanistan (AFG)	Afghanistan	أفغانستان	‘Afghanistan		
2	Bahrain (BRN)	Kingdom of Bahrain	مملكة البحرين	Mamlakat Albahrayn	Nasser bin Hamad Al Khalifa	Equestrian
3	Bangladesh (BAN)	Bangladesh	بنغلاديش	Banghladish	Shajahan Ali Shajahan Md	
4	Bhutan (BHU)	Bhutan	بوتان	Butan		
5	Brunei (BRU)	Brunei Darussalam	بروناي دار السلام	Brunay Dar Alsalam	HJ Mustafa Md Shawal	
6	Cambodia (CAM)	Cambodia	كمبوديا	Kambudya		
7	China (CHN)	People's Republic of China	جمهورية الصين الشعبية	Jumhuriat Alsiyn Alshaebia	Bao Chunlai	Badminton
8	Hong Kong (HKG)	Hong Kong, China	هونغ كونغ، الصين	Hungh Kunghi, Alsiyn		
9	India (IND)	India	الهند	Alhind	Jyoti Sunita Kullu	Hockey
10	Indonesia (INA)	Indonesia	أندونيسيا	‘Andunysya	Andy Ardiyansah	Beach volleyball
11	Iran (IRI)	Islamic Republic of Iran	الجمهورية الإسلامية الإيرانية	Aljumhuriat Al’Iislamiat Al’Iirania	Hossein Rezazadeh	Weightlifting
12	Iraq (IRQ)	Iraq	العراق	Aleiraq	Ali Salman	Wrestling
13	Japan (JPN)	Japan	اليابان	Alyaban	Saori Yoshida	Wrestling
14	Jordan (JOR)	Jordan	الأردن	Al’Urdunu	Nadin Dawani	Taekwondo
15	Kazakhstan (KAZ)	Kazakhstan	كازاخستان	Kazakhstan	Bakhtiyar Artayev	Boxing
16	North Korea (PRK)	Korea	كوريا	Kuria	Ri Kum-suk	Football
17	South Korea (KOR)	Korea	كوريا	Kuria	Lee Kyu-sup	Basketball
18	Kuwait (KUW)	Kuwait	الكويت	Alkuayt		
19	Kyrgyzstan (KGZ)	Kyrgyzstan	قيرغيزستان	Qirghizstan		
20	Laos (LAO)	Lao People's Democratic Republic	جمهورية لاو الديمقراطية الشعبية	Jumhuriat Law Aldiymuqratiat Alshaebia		
21	Lebanon (LIB)	Lebanon	لبنان	Lubnan	Alain Saade	Volleyball
22	Macau (MAC)	Macau, China	ماكاو، الصين	Makaw, Alsiyn	Han Jing	Wushu
23	Malaysia (MAS)	Malaysia	ماليزيا	Malizia	Josiah Ng	Cycling
24	Maldives (MDV)	Maldives	المالديف	Almaldif		
25	Mongolia (MGL)	Mongolia	منغوليا	Manghulia	Khashbaataryn Tsagaanbaatar	Judo
26	Myanmar (MYA)	Myanmar	ميانمار	Mianmar		
27	Nepal (NEP)	Nepal	نيبال	Nybal		
28	Oman (OMA)	Sultanate of Oman	سلطنة عمان	Saltanat Euman		
29	Pakistan (PAK)	Pakistan	باكستان	Bakistan	Shujauddin Malik	Weightlifting
30	Palestine (PLE)	Palestine	فلسطين	Filastin	Abu Hawelah Rami	Taekwondo
31	Philippines (PHI)	Philippines	فيلبيني	Filbini	Paeng Nepomuceno	Bowling
32	Saudi Arabia (KSA)	Kingdom of Saudi Arabia	المملكة العربية السعودية	Almamlakat Alearabiat Alsueudia	Alharkan Fahad Abdullah	
33	Singapore (SIN)	Singapore	سنغافورة	Singhafura	Roy Tay Junhao	Sailing
34	Sri Lanka (SRI)	Sri Lanka	سريلانكا	Sirilanka	Manjula Kumara	Athletics
35	Syria (SYR)	Syrian Arab Republic	الجمهورية العربية السورية	Aljumhuriat Alearabiat Alsuwria	Ahed Joughili	Weightlifting
36	Chinese Taipei (TPE)	Chinese Taipei	تايبيه الصينية	Taybyh Alsiynia		
37	Tajikistan (TJK)	Tajikistan	طاجيكستان	Tajikistan	Sherali Dostiev	Boxing
38	Thailand (THA)	Thailand	تايلاند	Tayland	Supachai Jitjumroon	Volleyball
39	Timor-Leste (TLS)	Timor-Leste	تيمور الشرقية	Taymur Alsharqia		
40	Turkmenistan (TKM)	Turkmenistan	تركمانستان	Turkamanistan		
41	United Arab Emirates (UAE)	United Arab Emirates	الإمارات العربية المتحدة	Al’Iimarat Alearabiat Almutahida	Maitha Al-Maktoum	Karate
42	Uzbekistan (UZB)	Uzbekistan	أوزبكستان	‘Uwzbakistan	Utkirbek Haydarov	Boxing
43	Vietnam (VIE)	Vietnam	فيتنام	Fiatnam	Trong Cuong Nguyen	Taekwondo
44	Yemen (YEM)	Republic of Yemen	الجمهورية اليمنية	Aljumhuriat Alyamania	Anas Aqlan	Taekwondo
45	Qatar (QAT)	State of Qatar	دولة قطر	Dawlat Qatar	Ahmed Saad Al Saad	Handball

=== Notes ===
- Three teams entered under their short names in English, but their full names in Arabic:
  - Jordan entered as "Hashemite Kingdom of Jordan" (Arabic: المملكة الأردنية الهاشمية, romanized: Al-Mamlakah al-’Urdunniyyah Al-Hāshimiyyah).
  - Kuwait entered as "State of Kuwait" (Arabic: دولة الكويت, romanized: Dawlat al-Kuwayt).
  - Palestine entered as "State of Palestine" (Arabic: دولة فلسطين, romanized: Dawlat Filasṭīn).
- For unknown reasons, Hong Kong was announced as هُونْغ كُونْغ، الصين Hung Kung, Alsiyn in Arabic, while Macau was announced as "Macau, China" (in English by the Arabic-language announcer).

== Notable guests ==
=== Qataris ===
- Hamad bin Khalifa Al Thani, Emir of Qatar
- Moza bint Nasser, Consort of Emir of Qatar
- Tamim bin Hamad Al Thani, Heir Apparent of Qatar and games' organising committee chairman
- Abdullah bin Khalifa Al Thani, Prime Minister of Qatar
- Jassem bin Hamad Al Thani, the personal representative of the Emir of Qatar

=== Foreign dignitaries ===
- International Olympic Committee president Jacques Rogge
- Sheikh Ahmad Al-Fahad Al-Sabah, chairman of the Olympic Council of Asia
- FIFA president Sepp Blatter
- President of Iran Mahmoud Ahmadinejad
- Prime Minister of Palestine Ismail Haniyeh
- President of Syria Bashar al-Assad
