= Sailing at the 2006 Asian Games – Girls' Optimist =

Girls' Optimist at the 2006 Asian Games
- Venue: Doha Sailing Club
- Date: 5–12 December 2006
- Competitors: 10 from 10 nations

Medalists
gold medal	Rufina Tan	Malaysia
silver medal	Haruka Komiya	Japan
bronze medal	Benjamas Poonpat	Thailand

The girls' Optimist competition at the 2006 Asian Games in Doha was held from 5 to 12 December 2006. It was an under-16 event and sailors born in or after 1991 were eligible to compete.

== Schedule ==
All times are Arabia Standard Time (UTC+03:00)

Date	Time	Event
Tuesday, 5 December 2006	11:00	Race 1
Wednesday, 6 December 2006	11:00	Race 2
Thursday, 7 December 2006	11:00	Race 3
Thursday, 7 December 2006	11:00	Race 4
Thursday, 7 December 2006	11:00	Race 5
Friday, 8 December 2006	11:00	Race 6
Friday, 8 December 2006	11:00	Race 7
Friday, 8 December 2006	11:00	Race 8
Sunday, 10 December 2006	11:00	Race 9
Sunday, 10 December 2006	11:00	Race 10
Monday, 11 December 2006	11:00	Race 11
Tuesday, 12 December 2006	11:00	Race 12

== Results ==
Legend

- DNC — Did not come to the starting area
- DNF — Did not finish
- OCS — On course side

Rank	Athlete	Race												Total
Rank	Athlete	1	2	3	4	5	6	7	8	9	10	11	12	Total
1st place, gold medalist(s)	Rufina Tan (MAS)	3	2	2	4	2	3	1	1	1	2	3	~~(6)~~	24
2nd place, silver medalist(s)	Haruka Komiya (JPN)	~~(11)~~; OCS	1	3	6	3	1	2	4	4	4	2	1	31
3rd place, bronze medalist(s)	Benjamas Poonpat (THA)	2	4	4	3	4	2	4	~~(5)~~	3	3	1	2	32
4	Griselda Khng (SIN)	~~(6)~~	6	1	2	1	6	3	3	2	1	6	4	35
5	Zhang Lihua (CHN)	1	3	5	1	5	4	5	2	5	~~(11)~~; OCS	4	3	38
6	Won Kai-han (TPE)	4	5	6	5	~~(7)~~	5	6	7	6	5	5	5	59
7	Radhika Jirasinha (SRI)	5	7	7	8	6	7	7	6	7	6	~~(11)~~; OCS	7	73
8	Lee Gyeong-jin (KOR)	8	~~(9)~~	8	7	8	9	9	9	9	7	7	9	90
9	Ghazal Mir Masood (PAK)	7	8	9	9	9	8	8	8	8	8	~~(11)~~; OCS	8	90
10	Alaa Shouhdy (QAT)	~~(11)~~; DNF	11; DNC	11; DNC	11; DNC	11; DNC	11; DNC	11; DNC	11; DNC	11; DNC	11; DNC	11; DNC	11; DNC	121
