= Bodybuilding at the 2006 Asian Games – Men's 60 kg =

Men's 60 kg at the 2006 Asian Games
- Venue: Al-Dana Banquet Hall
- Date: 8 December 2006
- Competitors: 15 from 13 nations

Medalists
gold medal	Qian Jicheng	China
silver medal	Phạm Văn Mách	Vietnam
bronze medal	Ibrahim Sihat	Singapore

The men's 60 kilograms event at the 2006 Asian Games was held on December 8, 2006 at the Al-Dana Banquet Hall in Doha, Qatar.

== Schedule ==
All times are Arabia Standard Time (UTC+03:00)

Date	Time	Event
Friday, 8 December 2006	10:00	Prejudging round
Friday, 8 December 2006	16:00	Final round

== Results ==
=== Prejudging round ===
Rank	Athlete	Score
1	Qian Jicheng (CHN)	5
2	Phạm Văn Mách (VIE)	14
3	Ibrahim Sihat (SIN)	18
4	Abbas Maki (BRN)	27
5	Cho Wang-bung (KOR)	27
6	Chen Jung-sheng (TPE)	30
7	Li Bo (CHN)	33
8	Somkhit Sumethowetchakun (THA)	36
9	Ng Han Cheng (SIN)	43
10	Salim Mazban (IRQ)	46
11	Dick Takiban (PHI)	54
12	Sachit Pradhan (NEP)	63
13	Lei Kuok Ieng (MAC)	69
14	Mahmood Ziyad (MDV)	73
DQ	Abdul Basir Latifi (AFG)	~~58~~

- Abdul Basir Latifi of Afghanistan originally got the 12th place, but was disqualified.

=== Final round ===
Rank	Athlete	Prej.	Final	Total
1st place, gold medalist(s)	Qian Jicheng (CHN)	5	5	10
2nd place, silver medalist(s)	Phạm Văn Mách (VIE)	14	14	28
3rd place, bronze medalist(s)	Ibrahim Sihat (SIN)	18	10	28
4	Cho Wang-bung (KOR)	27	20	47
5	Abbas Maki (BRN)	27	25	52
