= Cue sports at the 2006 Asian Games – Men's English billiards doubles =

Men's English billiards doubles at the 2006 Asian Games
- Venue: Al-Sadd Multi-Purpose Hall
- Dates: 6–7 December 2006
- Competitors: 18 from 9 nations

Medalists
gold medal	Praprut Chaithanasakun; Udon Khaimuk	Thailand
silver medal	Aung San Oo; Kyaw Oo	Myanmar
bronze medal	Geet Sethi; Ashok Shandilya	India

The men's English billiards doubles tournament at the 2006 Asian Games in Doha took place from 6 December to 7 December at Al-Sadd Multi-Purpose Hall.

The teams were seeded based on their final ranking at the same event at the 2002 Asian Games in Busan.

Thailand won the gold after beating Myanmar in the final 3 to 1, while bronze medal went to Indian team, they beat Pakistan in the bronze medal match 3 to 0.

== Schedule ==
All times are Arabia Standard Time (UTC+03:00)

Date	Time	Event
Wednesday, 6 December 2006	16:30	Round of 16
Wednesday, 6 December 2006	19:00	Quarterfinals
Thursday, 7 December 2006	10:00	Semifinals
Thursday, 7 December 2006	16:00	Finals

== Results ==
Round of 16
Alan Puan (SIN); Peter Gilchrist (SIN)	3
Mohammed Al-Khaldi (QAT); Khamis Al-Obaidly (QAT)	0

Quarterfinals
1	Praprut Chaithanasakun (THA); Udon Khaimuk (THA)	3
Nguyễn Thanh Bình (VIE); Nguyễn Thanh Long (VIE)	1
Nawaf Al-Ameer (BRN); Hussain Al-Watani (BRN)	0
4	Vishan Gir (PAK); Sohail Shahzad (PAK)	3
3	Aung San Oo (MYA); Kyaw Oo (MYA)	3
Alan Puan (SIN); Peter Gilchrist (SIN)	2
Lee Wan-soo (KOR); Park Seung-chil (KOR)	0
2	Geet Sethi (IND); Ashok Shandilya (IND)	3

Semifinals
1	Praprut Chaithanasakun (THA); Udon Khaimuk (THA)	3
4	Vishan Gir (PAK); Sohail Shahzad (PAK)	1
3	Aung San Oo (MYA); Kyaw Oo (MYA)	3
2	Geet Sethi (IND); Ashok Shandilya (IND)	2

Gold medal match
1	Praprut Chaithanasakun (THA); Udon Khaimuk (THA)	3
3	Aung San Oo (MYA); Kyaw Oo (MYA)	1
Bronze medal match
4	Vishan Gir (PAK); Sohail Shahzad (PAK)	0
2	Geet Sethi (IND); Ashok Shandilya (IND)	3
