= Shooting at the 2006 Asian Games – Women's 50 metre rifle prone team =

Women's 50 metre rifle prone team at the 2006 Asian Games
- Venue: Lusail Shooting Range
- Dates: 4 December 2006
- Competitors: 33 from 11 nations

Medalists
gold medal	Thailand; Thanyalak Chotphibunsin, Paramaporn Ponglaokham, Supamas Wankaew
silver medal	China; Liu Bo, Wang Chengyi, Wu Liuxi
bronze medal	Kazakhstan; Olga Dovgun, Galina Korchma, Varvara Kovalenko

The women's 50 metre rifle prone team competition at the 2006 Asian Games in Doha, Qatar was held on 4 December at the Lusail Shooting Range.

== Schedule ==
All times are Arabia Standard Time (UTC+03:00)

Date	Time	Event
Monday, 4 December 2006	09:45	Final

== Records ==
Prior to this competition, the existing world, Asian and Games records were as follows.

World Record	Soviet Union	1786	Moscow, Soviet Union	15 August 1990
Asian Record	China; South Korea	1778	Busan, South Korea	4 October 2002
Games Record	China; South Korea	1778	Busan, South Korea	4 October 2002

== Results ==
Rank	Team	Series						Total	Notes
Rank	Team	1	2	3	4	5	6	Total	Notes
1st place, gold medalist(s)	Thailand (THA)	292	296	295	294	296	294	1767	
	Thanyalak Chotphibunsin	99	98	98	98	99	99	591	
	Paramaporn Ponglaokham	97	100	97	98	98	96	586	
	Supamas Wankaew	96	98	100	98	99	99	590	
2nd place, silver medalist(s)	China (CHN)	292	296	292	295	292	293	1760	
	Liu Bo	98	99	98	98	96	96	585	
	Wang Chengyi	98	100	98	99	98	98	591	
	Wu Liuxi	96	97	96	98	98	99	584	
3rd place, bronze medalist(s)	Kazakhstan (KAZ)	294	293	291	290	292	297	1757	
	Olga Dovgun	99	97	97	100	99	99	591	
	Galina Korchma	97	99	97	96	96	100	585	
	Varvara Kovalenko	98	97	97	94	97	98	581	
4	South Korea (KOR)	291	292	290	296	291	297	1757	
	Hwang Su-hyun	94	97	97	100	94	100	582	
	Na Yoon-kyung	98	97	98	98	100	98	589	
	Yi Sang-soon	99	98	95	98	97	99	586	
5	India (IND)	291	293	288	287	286	292	1737	
	Anjali Bhagwat	96	99	95	96	96	96	578	
	Deepali Deshpande	97	96	97	94	95	99	578	
	Tejaswini Sawant	98	98	96	97	95	97	581	
6	Malaysia (MAS)	291	293	288	287	286	292	1734	
	Nor Dalilah Abu Bakar	95	96	98	97	97	94	577	
	Mariani Rafali	97	97	96	96	95	93	574	
	Nur Suryani Taibi	94	97	98	96	99	99	583	
7	Vietnam (VIE)	292	291	285	286	290	287	1731	
	Đàm Thị Nga	97	96	94	96	97	96	576	
	Nguyễn Thị Hòa	97	98	96	97	95	96	579	
	Thẩm Thúy Hồng	98	97	95	93	98	95	576	
8	Uzbekistan (UZB)	285	286	291	288	291	289	1730	
	Yana Fatkhi	98	92	96	98	99	98	581	
	Elena Kuznetsova	96	98	97	93	97	96	577	
	Sakina Mamedova	91	96	98	97	95	95	572	
9	Mongolia (MGL)	289	286	287	291	282	292	1727	
	Zorigtyn Batkhuyag	96	98	95	98	94	98	579	
	Damdinsürengiin Lkhamsüren	96	95	93	96	95	98	573	
	Chuluunbadrakhyn Narantuyaa	97	93	99	97	93	96	575	
10	Bahrain (BRN)	289	284	291	291	281	288	1724	
	Ruqaya Al-Rowaiei	95	96	98	96	90	95	570	
	Lulwa Al-Zayani	96	95	96	97	98	98	580	
	Aysha Suwaileh	98	93	97	98	93	95	574	
11	Qatar (QAT)	291	289	284	283	287	284	1718	
	Mahbubeh Akhlaghi	98	98	96	96	96	95	579	
	Matara Al-Aseiri	97	98	95	96	97	95	578	
	Maytha Al-Kubaisi	96	93	93	91	94	94	561	
