= Singapore at the 2006 Asian Games =

- IOC code: SIN
- NOC: Singapore National Olympic Council
- Website: www.singaporeolympics.com (in English)

in Doha
- Competitors: 134
- Flag bearer: Roy Tay Junhao
- Medals Ranked 12th: Gold 8 Silver 7 Bronze 12 Total 27

Asian Games appearances (overview)
- 1951; 1954; 1958; 1962; 1966; 1970; 1974; 1978; 1982; 1986; 1990; 1994; 1998; 2002; 2006; 2010; 2014; 2018; 2022; 2026

Singapore participated at the 2006 Asian Games in Doha under the IOC country code SIN. It sent its largest contingent since participating in the Asian Games in 1951, with 215 members: 134 athletes and 81 officials. The contingent was led by Chef-de-Mission Annabel Pennefather and the flag-bearer was sailor Tay Junhao Roy.

A total of eight gold medals were targeted prior to the commencement of the games, three more than its best-ever haul in the 2002 Asian Games in Busan. These medals were expected in bowling, bodybuilding, sailing and cue sports. By 10 December bowling and bodybuilding delivered a gold each, although the later did not reach their target of two gold medals. Shooting and cue sports failed to deliver, while swimming contributed a surprise gold medal. They reached their target of 8 golds at 13 December 2006, a surprising 5 golds in Sailing, beating China in the Sailing Medal Table, making it Singapore's best ever performance at the Asian games.

== Medals ==
Rank	sport	Gold	Silver	Bronze	Total
1	Sailing	5	3	2	10
2	Bowling	1	2	2	5
3	Bodybuilding	1	0	2	3
4	Swimming	1	0	1	2
5	Table tennis	0	1	2	3
6	Shooting	0	1	0	1
7	Badminton	0	0	1	1
7	Cue sports	0	0	1	1
7	Wushu	0	0	1	1
10	Athletics	0	0	0	0
10	Fencing	0	0	0	0
10	Football	0	0	0	0
10	Golf	0	0	0	0
10	Gymnastics	0	0	0	0
10	Karate	0	0	0	0
10	Rowing	0	0	0	0
Totals (16 entries)		8	7	12	27

Sport	No. of athletes
Sailing	20
Bowling	12
Bodybuilding	6
Swimming	15
Table tennis	10
Shooting	9
Badminton	12
Cue sports	9
Athletics	1
Fencing	4
Football	20
Golf	4
Gymnastics	1
Karate	1
Rowing	1
Wushu	7
Total	132

== Medalists ==
Medal	Name	Sport	Event	Date
Gold	Michelle Kwang; Valerie Teo	Bowling	Women's doubles	4
Gold	Tao Li	Swimming	Women's 50 metre butterfly	7
Gold	Chua Ling Fung Simon	Bodybuilding	Men's 70 kg	8
Gold	Maximilian Soh	Sailing	Men's Laser	12
Gold	Colin Cheng	Sailing	Laser 4.7	12
Gold	Justin Liu; Sherman Cheng	Sailing	Boys' 420	13
Gold	Sarah Tan; Lim Tze Ting	Sailing	Girls' 420	13
Gold	Ivan Tan; Justin Wong; Renfred Tay; Teo Wee Chin; Roy Tay	Sailing	Match racing	13
Silver	Adrienne Ser; Jasmine Ser; Vanessa Yong	Shooting	Women's 10 metre air rifle team	2
Silver	Li Jiawei; Sun Beibei; Tan Paey Fern; Tan Yan Zhen; Zhang Xueling	Table tennis	Women's team	3
Silver	Lee Yu Wen; Jason Yeong-Nathan; Remy Ong	Bowling	Men's trios	6
Silver	Remy Ong	Bowling	Men's masters	10
Silver	Koh Seng Leong	Sailing	Laser Radial	12
Silver	Xu Yuan Zhen; Terence Koh	Sailing	Men's 470	13
Silver	Toh Liying; Elizabeth Tan	Sailing	Women's 470	13
Bronze	Tao Li	Swimming	Women's 100 metre butterfly	2
Bronze	Siti Noor Ashikin; Jiang Yanmei; Li Li; Li Yujia; Frances Liu; Vanessa Neo; Shinta Mulia Sari; Xing Aiying	Badminton	Women's team	5
Bronze	Peter Gilchrist	Cue sports	Men's English billiards singles	5
Bronze	Li Jiawei	Table tennis	Women's singles	7
Bronze	Yang Zi; Li Jiawei	Table tennis	Mixed doubles	7
Bronze	Ibrahim Sihat	Bodybuilding	Men's 60 kg	8
Bronze	Mohd Ismail Muhammad	Bodybuilding	Men's 75 kg	8
Bronze	Jennifer Tan; Cherie Tan; Evelyn Chan; Michelle Kwang; Valerie Teo; Sabrina Lim	Bowling	Women's team of 5	8
Bronze	Valerie Teo	Bowling	Women's all-events	8
Bronze	Sean Lee	Sailing	Men's Optimist	12
Bronze	Melcolm Huang; Chung Pei Quan	Sailing	Hobie 16	13
Bronze	Goh Qiu Bin	Wushu	Men's taijiquan	13

== Results by event ==
=== Athletics ===
Women's High Jump

- Sng Suat Li Michelle (1.75, finished 9th out of 13)

=== Badminton ===
Men's singles

- Kendrick Lee
  - Round of 32: lost to Japan 0-2
- Ronald Susilo
  - Round of 32: defeated Syria (Tarek Shalboum) 2-0
  - Round of 16: lost to China (Bao Chunlai) 1-2

Men's doubles

- Hendri Kurniawan Saputra, Hendra Wijaya
  - Round of 32: defeated Japan 2-0
  - Round of 16: lost to Indonesia 0-2

Women's singles

- Li Li
  - Round of 32: defeated Chinese Taipei 2-1
  - Round of 16: lost to Hong Kong, China (Wang Chen) 0-2
- Xing Aiying
  - Round of 32: defeated Nepal (Sumina Shrestha) 2-0
  - Round of 16: defeated Japan (Kaori Mori) 2-0
  - Quarterfinal: lost to Korea (Hwang Hye Yeon) 1-2

Women's doubles

- Shinta Mulia Sari, Vanessa Neo
  - Round of 32: lost to Indonesia 0-2
- Jiang Yanmei, Li Yujia
  - Round of 16: defeated Hong Kong, China (Koon Wai Chee Louisa, Wong Man Ching) 2-1
  - Quarterfinal: lost to Korea (Lee Kyung-won, Lee Hyo-jung) 0-2

Women's team:

- Jiang Yanmei, Li Li, Li Yujia, Vanessa Neo, Shinta Mulia Sari, Xing Aiying
  - League Stage (Pool X): defeated Thailand 4-1
  - League Stage (Pool X): lost to Hong Kong, China 2-3
  - Semi-final: lost to Japan 3-0, finished 3rd

Mixed doubles

- Li Yujia, Hendri Kurniawan Saputra
  - Round of 16: lost to Malaysia 0-2
- Hendra Wijaya, Frances Liu
  - Round of 16: lost to Malaysia 0-2

=== Bodybuilding ===
Men's 60 kg

- Ibrahim bin Sihat
  - Pre-judging Round: 18, ranked 3rd out of 14
  - Final Round: 46, ranked 3rd out of 5
- Ng Han Cheng Vincent
  - Pre-judging Round: 43, ranked 9th out of 14

Men's 65 kg

- Amir bin Zainal
  - Pre-judging Round: 36, ranked 6th out of 15
- Nor Perwira Jaya Rahmat
  - Pre-judging Round: 41, ranked 9th out of 15

Men's 70 kg

- Chua Ling Fung Simon
  - Pre-judging Round: 5, ranked 1st out of 15
  - Final Round: 15, ranked 1st out of 5

Men's 75 kg

- Mohamed Ismail Muhammad
  - Pre-judging Round: 20, ranked 3rd out of 8
  - Final Round: 57, ranked 3rd out of 5

=== Bowling ===
Men's singles

- De Vries Carl Jan: (176 209 224 146 205 202 Total: 1162, finished 80th out of 114)
- Lee Yu-Wen: (204 184 211 236 222 204 Total: 1261, finished 29th out of 114)
- Lim Guo Liang Lionel: (213 179 181 233 178 224 Total: 1208, finished 61st out of 114)
- Ng Qenn Shaun: (184 199 191 202 235 186 Total: 1197, finished 65th out of 114)
- Ong Remy: (223 192 193 205 257 179 Total: 1249, finished 37th out of 114)
- Yeong Nathan Jason: (269 259 207 202 184 137 Total: 1258, finished 31st out of 114)

Men's doubles

- Lee Yu-Wen, Ong Remy (2734, finished 6th out of 56)
- Yeong Nathan Jason, Ng Qenn Shaun (2717, finished 7th out of 56)
- De Vries Carl Jan, Lim Guo Liang Lionel (2693, finished 9th out of 56)

Men's Trios

- Lee Yu-Wen, Yeong Nathan Jason, Ong Remy (3985, finished 2nd out of 37)
- Lim Guo Liang Lionel, De Vries Carl Jan, Ng Qenn Shaun (3802, finished 8th out of 37)

Men's Five Player Teams

- De Vries Carl Jan, Lee Yu-Wen, Lim Guo Liang Lionel, Ng Qenn Shaun, Ong Remy, Yeong Nathan Jason: (6346, finished 4th out of 20)

Men's All Events

- De Vries Carl Jan 210.5, finished 35th out of 114
- Lee Yu-Wen 217.5, finished 13th out of 114
- Lim Guo Liang Lionel 204.4, finished 62nd out of 114
- Ng Qenn Shaun 216.3, finished 20th out of 114
- Ong Remy 218.6, finished 10th out of 114
- Yeong Nathan Jason 215.0, finished 23 out of 114

Men's Masters

- Lee Yu-Wen
  - 222.8, finished 11th out of 16
- Ong Remy
  - 235.5, finished 2nd out of 16
  - 2nd/3rd Place: defeated Korea (Choi Bok Eum) 259-195
  - 1st/2nd Place: lost to Korea (Jo Nam Yi) 411(199,212)-455(221,234), finished 2nd

Women's singles

- Chan Lu Ee Evelyn: (156 246 175 188 180 182 Total: 1127, finished 53rd out of 77)
- Kwang Tien Mei Michelle: (184 219 174 182 210 249 Total: 1218, finished 26th out of 77)
- Lim Li Koon Sabrina: (211 183 195 215 183 174 Total: 1161, finished 42nd out of 77)
- Tan Bee Leng: (192 234 238 224 206 224 Total: 1318, finished 5th out of 77)
- Tan Shi Hua Cherie: (195 186 210 222 171 225 Total: 1209, finished 29th out of 77)
- Teo Hui Ying Valerie: (234 179 226 216 195 225 Total: 1275, finished 14th out of 77)

Women's Double

- Kwang Tien Mei Michelle, Teo Hui Ying Valerie: (2671, finished 1st out of 37)
- Tan Bee Leng, Tan Shi Hua Cherie: (2582, finished 4th out of 37)
- Lim Li Koon Sabrina, Chan Lu Ee Evelyn: (2528, finished 9th out of 37)

Women's Trios

- Tan Bee Leng, Kwang Tien Mei Michelle, Teo Hui Ying Valerie: (3884, finished 4th out of 24)
- Tan Shi Hua Cherie, Lim Li Koon Sabrina, Chan Lu Ee Evelyn: (3533, finished 10th out of 24)

Women's Five Player Teams

- Chan Lu Ee Evelyn, Kwang Tien Mei Michelle, Tan Bee Leng, Tan Shi Hua Cherie, Teo Hui Ying Valerie: (6239, finished 3rd out of 12)

Women's All Events

- Chan Lu Ee Evelyn 199.4, finished 31st out of 77
- Kwang Tien Mei Michelle 211.3, finished 16th out of 77
- Lim Li Koon Sabrina 196.0, finished 41st out of 77
- Tan Bee Leng 216.1, finished 4th out of 77
- Tan Shi Hua Cherie 204.8, finished 22nd out of 77
- Teo Hui Ying Valerie 218.5, finished 3rd out of 77

Women's Masters

- Tan Bee Leng
  - 206.5, finished 12th out of 16
- Teo Hui Ying Valerie
  - 211.5, finished 9th out of 16

=== Cue sports ===
Men's 8 Ball Pool-Singles

- Tan Tiong Boon
  - Round of 32: lost to Korea (Jeoung Young Hwa) 5-9
- Tay Choon Kiat Bernard
  - Round of 32: lost to Japan 6-9

Men's 9 Ball Pool-Singles

- Chan Keng Kwang
  - Round of 64: lost to Indonesia (Muhammad Zulfikri Fikri) 7-11
- Toh Lian Han
  - Round of 32: lost to Chinese Taipei (Yang Ching Shun) 9-11

Men's English Billiard-Singles

- Peter Gilchrist
  - Round of 16: defeated Myanmar (Kyaw Oo) 3-2
  - Quarterfinal: defeated Thailand (Sujartthurakarn Thawat) 3-1
  - Semifinal: lost to India (Shandil Ya Ashok Harishankar) 0-3
  - Bronze Medal Match: defeated Myanmar (Aung San Oo) 3-1, finished 3rd
- Puan Teik Chong Alan
  - Round of 16: lost to Pakistan (Shahzad Imran) 2-3

Men's English Billiard-Doubles

- Peter Gilchrist, Puan Teik Chong Alan
  - Round of 16: defeated Qatar (AL Khaldi Mohammed, AL Obaidli Khamis) 3-0
  - Quarterfinal: lost to Myanmar (Aung San Oo, Kyaw Oo) 2-3

Men's Snooker-Singles

- E Boon Aun Keith
  - Round of 32: lost to Hong Kong, China (Fu Ka Chun Marco) 1-4

Men's Snooker-Doubles

- E Boon Aun Keith, Peter Gilchrist
  - Round of 32: lost to Malaysia (Lai Chee Wei, Moh Keen Hoo) 0-1

Men's Snooker-Teams

- E Boon Aun Keith, Peter Gilchrist
  - Round of 32: lost to India 0-1

Women's 8 Ball Pool-Singles

- Chai Zeet Huey Charlene
  - Round of 32: lost to China (Pan Xiaoting) 0-7
- Hoe Shu Wah Amy
  - Round of 32: lost to Philippines (Basas Mary Ann) 6-7

Women's 9 Ball Pool-Singles

- Chai Zeet Huey Charlene
  - Round of 16: lost to China (Pan Xiaoting) 3-7
- Hoe Shu Wah Amy
  - Round of 16: lost to Malaysia (Kwan Esther Suet Yee) 5-7

=== Fencing ===
Women's Individual Foil

- Ng Yi Lin Ruth
  - Round of Pooles: 21
  - Round of 16: lost to China (Chen Jinyan) 1-15
- Tan Yu Ling
  - Round of Pooles: 21
  - Round of 16: defeated Philippines (Nuestro Veena Tessa) 15-8
  - Quarterfinals: lost to Korea (Nam Hyun Hee) 2-15

Women's Team Foil

- Ng Yi Lin Ruth, Ser Xue Ling Serene, Tan Yu Ling, Wang Wenying
- Quarterfinals: lost to Kazakhstan 34-45

=== Football ===
Men's team:

- First round (Group B): tied with Syria, 0-0
- First round (Group B): lost to Iraq, 0-2
- First round (Group B): tied with Indonesia, 1-1

Finished at third position in Group B and failed to advance to next stage. No results from Doha website regarding these results.

=== Golf ===
Men's Individual

- Choo Tze Huang (70, 70, 69, 70, finished 4th out of 69)
- Han Wen Yuan Justin (75, 74, 79, 80, finished 48th out of 69)
- Khua Kian Ann Vincent (72, 75, 72, 80, finished 38th out of 69)
- Leong Kit Wai Jonathan (74, 71, 70, 73, finished 16th out of 69)

Men's Team

- Choo Tze Huang, Han Wen Yuan Justin, Khua Kian Ann Vincent, Leong Kit Wai Jonathan (216, 215, 211, 223, finished 6th out of 17)

=== Gymnastics ===
Women's Floor

- Lim Heem Wei (Floor: 13.450, 8th out of 8)

Women's Vault

- Lim Heem Wei (Vault: 13.500, 13.150, Total: 13.325, 7th out of 8)

Women's Team Individual Qualification

- Lim Heem Wei (Vault: 13.150, Uneven Bars: 11.600, Beam: 12.00, Floor: 14.050, Total: 50.800, 16th out of 37)

Women's Individual All-Around

- Lim Heem Wei (Vault: 13.200, Uneven Bars: 11.600, Beam: 13.050, Floor: 14.150, Total: 52.000, 9th out of 20)

=== Rowing ===
Women's Lightweight Single Sculls

- Lim Kim Hiok Elsie
  - Heats: 6:11.92
  - Semifinal A/B: 3:38.22, 7th out of 8
  - Final B: 4:38.62, 4th out of 4

Women's Single Sculls

- Lim Kim Hiok Elsie
  - Heats: 5:15.80
  - Repechage: 3:56.23
  - Semifinal A/B: 3:49.40, 5th out of 8
  - Final B: 4:33.77, 2nd out of 4

=== Sailing ===
Event	Participant	1	2	3	4	5	6	7	8	9	10	11	12	Rank
Men's 420	Cheng Feng Yuan Sherman; Liu Xiaman Justin	4	1	2	4	2	1	1	1	1	1	5	4	1
Men's 470	Koh Seng Kiat Terence; Xu Yuan Zhen	1	3	1	2	5	1	3	7P	1	5	9 DNE	7	2
Men's Laser	Soh Khyan Tat Maximilian	12OCS	1	3	2	1	5	1	1	3	2	1	2	1
Men's Optimist	Lee Teik Ren Sean	8	7	5	3	3	2	2	1	4	4	12 OCS	2	3
Women's 420	Lim Tze Ting; Tan Wei Lin Sarah	1	1	1	1	1	1	1	2	1	1	3	1	1
Women's 470	Tan Li Yong Elizabeth; Toh Liying	2	2	2	1	4	3	3	3	3	2	3	2	3
Women's Optimist	Griselda Khng	6	6	1	2	1	6	3	3	2	1	6	4	4
Hobie 16 Open	Chung Pei Quan; Huang Jingjie Melcolm	1	3	4	3	3	3	1	2	1	2	3	4	3
Laser 4.7 Open	Cheng Xinru Colin	2	1	9OCS	2	1	6	1	2	3	3	1	1	1
Laser Radial Open	Koh Seng Leong	3	4	4	4	5	1	5	2	7	3	1	1	2

Open Beneteau 7.5

- Tan Hsiao Loong Ivan, Tay Junhao Roy, Tay Renfred, Teo Wee Chin, Wong Ming Ho Justin
  - Preliminary Round: 11 points, ranked 1 out of 8
  - Final - SIN beat IND

=== Shooting ===
Men's 10m Air Rifle

- Ong Jun Hong (Qualification: 99, 98, 99, 97, 97, 97, Total: 587, 20th out of 54)
- Zhang Jin (Qualification: 97, 97, 97, 97, 98, 100, Total: 586, 22nd out of 54)
- Koh Tien Wei Jonathan (Qualification: 97, 96, 97, 100, 100, 96, Total: 586, 23rd out of 54)

Team score: 1759

Men's Trap

- Choo Choon Seng (Qualification: 20, 20, 23, 19, 19, Total: 101, 17th out of 34)
- Lee Wung Yew (Qualification: 21, 20, 24, 21, 21, Total: 107, 7th out of 34)
- Mohd Zain Amat (Qualification: 19, 20, 21, 21, 20, Total: 101, 16th out of 34)

Team score: 309

Women's 10m Air Rifle

- Ser Xiang Wei Jasmine (Qualification: 99, 99, 98, 100, Total: 396, 5th out of 54; Finals: 9.8, 9.5, 10.6, 9.3, 9.6, 10.8, 10.6, 10.6, 10.6, 10.3, Total: 101.7, Grand Total: 497.7, 7th position out of 8)
- Ser Xiang Ying Adrienne (Qualification: 98, 98, 98, 99, Total: 393, 11th out of 54)
- Yong Yu Zhen Vanessa (Qualification: 97, 99, 100, 98, Total: 394, 10th out of 54)

Team score: 1183, 2nd position

=== Swimming ===
Event	Competitor	Heats		Finals	
Event	Competitor	Time	Position	Time	Position
Men's 50m Backstroke	Tan Lee Yu Gary	27.58	11h out of 30	Did not qualify	
Men's 50m Breaststroke	Tan Jin Leonard	30.17	16th out of 35	Did not qualify	
Men's 50m Breaststroke	Tan Lee Yu Gary	30.65	19th out of 35	Did not qualify	
Men's 100m Backstroke	Tan Lee Yu Gary	58.81	8th out of 29	59.08	8th
Men's 100m Breaststroke	Tan Jin Leonard	1:05.43	15th out of 34	Did not qualify	
Men's 100m Freestyle	Tan Lee Yu Gary	52.67	14th out of 42	Did not qualify	
Men's 100m Freestyle	Tay Zhirong	51.75	8th out of 42	51.44	8th
Men's 200m Breaststroke	Lim Zhi Cong	2:28.89	17th out of 26	Did not qualify	
Men's 200m Breaststroke	Tan Jin Leonard	2:22.48	13th out of 26	Did not qualify	
Men's 200m Freestyle	Cheah Mingzhe Marcus	1:55.99	15th out of 35	Did not qualify	
Men's 200m Freestyle	Tay Zhirong	1:53.04	7th out of 35	1:52.09	7th
Men's 200m Individual Medley	Lim Zhi Cong	2:09.09	9th out of 23	Did not qualify	
Men's 1500m Freestyle	Cheah Mingzhe Marcus	Not held		16:04.33	8th out of 15
Women's 50m Butterfly	Tao Li	26.87	2nd out of 28	26.73	1st
Women's 50m Butterfly	Joscelin Yeo	27.63	6th out of 28	27.69	7th
Women's 200m Individual Medley	Joscelin Yeo	2:17.60	2nd out of 18	2:17.11	4th

Men's 400m Freestyle

- Cheah Mingzhe Marcus (Heats: 4:03.94; 9th out of 26)
- Sng Ju Wei (Heats: Withdrew)

Men's 400m Individual Medley

- Lim Zhi Cong (Heats: 4:35.27, 8th out of 17; Finals: 4:35.56, 7th)

Men's 4 × 200 m Freestyle Relay

- Cheah Mingzhe Marcus, Tan Lee Yu Gary, Tay Zhirong, Sng Ju Wei (Heats: 7:42.74; Finals: 7:39.61, 4th)

Women's 50m Backstroke

- Lynette Ng (Heats: 30.31, 9th out of 23)
- Tao Li (Heats: 29.40,4th out of 23; Finals: 29.20, 6th)

Women's 50m Breaststroke

- Ho Ru En (Heats: 34.62, 9th out of 19)
- Nicolette Teo (Heats: 33.33, 5th out of 19; Finals: 33.35, 7th)

Women's 50m Freestyle

- Ho Shu Yong (Heats: 27.45; 15th out of 34)
- Lynette Ng (Heats: 27.22, 12th out of 34)

Women's 100m Backstroke

- Lynette Ng (Heats: 1:06.81, ranked 10th out of 19)

Women's 100m Breaststroke

- Nicolette Teo (Heats: 1:11.65, 5th out of 17; Finals: 1:11.16, 5th)

Women's 100m Butterfly

- Tao Li (Heats: 59.53, 1st out of 20; Finals: 58.96, 3rd)
- Joscelin Yeo (Heats: 1:00.97, 8th out of 20; Finals: 1:00.65, 8th)

Women's 100m Freestyle

- Mylene Ong (Heats: 59.29, 13th out of 28)
- Lynette Ng (Heats: 59.39, 14th out of 28)

Women's 200m Breaststroke

- Nicolette Teo (Heats: 2:37.41, 7th out of 14; Finals: 2:38.43, 7th)

Women's 200m Butterfly

- Quah Ting Wen (2:20.52; Finals: 2:21.27, 8th)

Women's 200m Freestyle

- Quah Ting Wen (Heats: 2:07:51, 9th out of 21)
- Mylene Ong (Heats: 2:08:33, 10th out of 21)

Women's 400m Freestyle

- Quah Ting Wen (Heats: 4:22:72; Finals: 4:21:00, 7th out of 17)
- Tan Pei Shan (Heats: 4:30:07, 13th out of 17)

Women's 800m Freestyle

- Quah Ting Wen (Finals: 9:01.01, 7th out of 13)
- Tan Pei Shan (Finals: 9:21.10, 12th out of 13)

Women's 4 × 100 m Freestyle Relay

- Ho Shu Yong, Lynette Ng, Mylene Ong, Tao Li (Heats: 3:58.47 5th out of 9; Finals: 3:53.33, 5th)

Women's 4 × 200 m Freestyle Relay

- Mylene Ong, Quah Ting Wen, Tan Pei Shan, Tao Li (Heats: 8:46.16 5th out of 9; Finals: 8:31.78, 7th)

Women's 4 × 100 m Medley Relay

- Mylene Ong, Tao Li, Nicolette Teo, Joscelin Yeo (Finals: 4:16.87, 5th)

=== Table tennis ===
Men's singles

- Gao Ning
  - Round of 32: Defeated Sri Lanka (Rohana Sirisena) 4-0
  - Round of 16: lost to Chinese Taipei (Chuang Chih Yuan) 1-4
- Yang Zi
  - Round of 32: Defeated Kuwait (Hatem Wadi) 4-0
  - Round of 16: lost to China (Ma Lin) 0-4

Men's doubles

- Cai Xiaoli, Lee Tien Hoe Clarence
  - Round of 32: defeated Qatar 3-0
  - Round of 16: lost to Korea 1-3
- Gao Ning, Yang Zi
  - Round of 32: defeated Macau, China 3-0
  - Round of 16: lost to Japan 1-3

Men's Team

- Cai Xiaoli, Gao Ning, Ho Jia Ren Jason, Lee Tien Hoe Clarence, Yang Zi
  - Stage 1 (Group D): defeated North Korea 3-2
  - Stage 1 (Group D): lost to Chinese Taipei 1-3
  - Quarterfinal: lost to South Korea 0-3

Women's singles

- Li Jiawei
  - Round of 32: Defeated Kuwait (Dalal Alhammad) 4-0
  - Round of 16: Defeated Thailand (Anisara Muangsuk) 4-3
  - Quarterfinal: Defeated South Korea (Kwak Bang Bang) 4-0
  - Semifinals: lost to China (Guo Yue) 1-4; finished 3rd
- Sun Beibei
  - Round of 32: Defeated Lebanon (Lara Kejebachian) 4-0
  - Round of 16: lost to China (Wang Nan) 1-4

Women's doubles

- Li Jiawei, Sun Beibei
  - Round of 32: defeated Macau, China 3-0
  - Round of 16: defeated Uzbekistan 3-0
  - Quarterfinal: lost to China (Guo Yue, Li Xiaoxia) 0-3
- Tan Paey Fern, Zhang Xueling
  - Round of 32: lost to China 1-3

Women's Team

- Li Jiawei, Sun Beibei, Tan Paey Fern, Tan Yan Zhen, Zhang Xueling
  - Stage 1 (Group D): defeated Macau 3-0
  - Stage 1 (Group D): defeated Thailand 3-1
  - Quarterfinal: defeated Hong Kong, China 3–1
  - Semifinal: defeated North Korea 3–2
  - Finals: lost to China 3-0; finished 2nd

Mixed doubles

- Gao Ning, Zhang Xueling
  - Round of 32: defeated India (Roy Soumyadeep, Das Mouma) 3-1
  - Round of 16: lost to Hong Kong, China (Ko Lai Chak, Zhang Rui) 1-3
- Yang Zi, Li Jiawei
  - Round of 16: defeated Japan (Seiya Kishikawa, Ai Fujinuma) 3-2
  - Quarterfinals: defeated Hong Kong, China (Li Ching, Tie Ya Na) 3-2
  - Semifinals: lost to Korea (Lee Jung Woo, Lee Eun Hee) 0-4; finished 3rd

=== Wushu ===
Men's Changquan - Three Events Combined

- Siow Kin Yan
  - Changquan (Long-fist): 8.91, 12th out of 20
  - Daoshu (Broadsword): 9.32, 11th out of 20
  - Gunshu (Cudgel): 9.37, 8th out of 20
  - Overall: 10th out of 20

Women's Changquan - Three Events Combined

- Khor Poh Chin Michelle
  - Qiangshu (Spear): 9.25, 6th out of 12
  - Changquan (Long-fist): 9.38, 4th out of 12
  - Jianshu (Sword): 9.47, 7th out of 12
  - Overall: 4th out of 12
- Ng Xinni
  - Qiangshu (Spear): 9.05, 8th out of 12
  - Changquan (Long-fist): 9.26, 6th out of 12
  - Jianshu (Sword): 9.45, 8th out of 12
  - Overall: 8th out of 12

Women's Taijiquan - Two Events Combined

- Tao Yi Jun
  - Taijiquan (Shadow boxing): 9.49, 9th out of 16
  - Taijijian (Taiji sword): 9.35, 11th out of 16
  - Overall: 11th out of 16

Men's Taijiquan - Two Events Combined

- Yang Yong Kai Eugene
  - Taijiquan (Shadow boxing): 9.5, 5th out of 17
  - Taijijian (Taiji sword): 9.54, 5th out of 17
  - Overall: 5th out of 17
- Goh Qiu Bin
  - Taijiquan (Shadow boxing): 9.59, 3rd out of 17
  - Taijijian (Taiji sword): 9.54, 5th out of 17
  - Overall: 3rd out of 17

Women's Nanquan - Three Events Combined

- Deng Ying Zhi
  - Southern-fist: 0, 10th out of 11
  - Southern-style Cudgel: 9.27, 7th out of 11
  - Southern Broadsword: 9.05, 8th out of 11
  - Overall: 10th out of 11
