= Shooting at the 2006 Asian Games – Women's double trap =

Women's double trap at the 2006 Asian Games
- Venue: Lusail Shooting Range
- Dates: 5 December 2006
- Competitors: 19 from 7 nations

Medalists
gold medal	Son Hye-kyoung	South Korea
silver medal	Janejira Srisongkram	Thailand
bronze medal	Lee Bo-na	South Korea

The women's double trap competition at the 2006 Asian Games in Doha, Qatar was held on 5 December at the Lusail Shooting Range.

== Schedule ==
All times are Arabia Standard Time (UTC+03:00)

Date	Time	Event
Tuesday, 5 December 2006	08:30	Final

== Records ==
Prior to this competition, the existing world, Asian and Games records were as follows.

World Record	Zhang Yafei (CHN)	115	Nicosia, Cyprus	20 October 2000
Asian Record	Zhang Yafei (CHN)	115	Nicosia, Cyprus	20 October 2000
Games Record	Wang Yujin (CHN)	112	Hiroshima, Japan	10 October 1994

== Results ==
Rank	Athlete	Round			Total	S-off	Notes
Rank	Athlete	1	2	3	Total	S-off	Notes
1st place, gold medalist(s)	Son Hye-kyoung (KOR)	34	37	34	105		
2nd place, silver medalist(s)	Janejira Srisongkram (THA)	39	33	31	103		
3rd place, bronze medalist(s)	Lee Bo-na (KOR)	36	33	32	101		
4	Hsu Hsiao-ju (TPE)	36	29	35	100		
5	Zhang Yafei (CHN)	32	33	33	98		
6	Kim Mi-jin (KOR)	34	36	27	97		
7	Wang Yujin (CHN)	34	31	31	96		
8	Zhu Mei (CHN)	35	29	30	94		
9	Punnapa Asvanit (THA)	28	28	31	87		
10	Supornpan Chewchalermmit (THA)	30	27	28	85		
11	Hoàng Thị Tuất (VIE)	27	28	26	81		
12	Anastassiya Davydova (KAZ)	30	26	22	78		
13	Yelena Struchayeva (KAZ)	25	23	25	73		
14	Mariya Dmitriyenko (KAZ)	25	26	20	71		
15	Noora Al-Ali (QAT)	25	17	21	63		
16	Nguyễn Thị Tuyết Mai (VIE)	18	21	16	55		
17	Nguyễn Thùy Dương (VIE)	23	15	15	53		
18	Hanaa Hassan (QAT)	16	19	13	48		
19	Amna Al-Abdulla (QAT)	18	12	8	38		
