= Sepak takraw at the 2006 Asian Games – Women's team regu =

Women's team regu at the 2006 Asian Games
- Venue: Al-Sadd Indoor Hall
- Date: 2–6 December 2006
- Competitors: 64 from 6 nations

Medalists
gold medal	Vietnam
silver medal	Thailand
bronze medal	China
bronze medal	South Korea

The women's team regu sepak takraw competition at the 2006 Asian Games in Doha was held from 2 December to 6 December at the Al-Sadd Indoor Hall.

== Squads ==
China	India	Japan	South Korea
Zhou Ronghong; Sun Xiaodan; Wang Xiaohua; Wang Jianshuang; Lu Jiajia; Song Cheng; Chen Caiping; Feng Zhiying; Wang Yan; Li Yajing	Ronibala Chanu; Meri Devi Moirangthem; Premila Devi Seram; Bilashini Devi Oinam; Romita Devi Maibam; Memi Devi Thounam; Anitha Kancharla; Priyanka Purvaja Muregesh; Anita Sahoo; Aruna Devi Mutum; Rasheshwari Devi Elangbam; Gajendran Gayathri	Keiko Ishikawa; Sawa Aoki; Chiharu Oku; Mari Nakagawa; Maki Osamura; Ayumi Yajima; Aika Hara; Keiko Takayama; Satomi Ishihara	Lee Myung-eun; Park Keum-duk; Jung Ji-yung; Ahn Soon-ok; Jeong In-seon; Yu Yeong-sim; Kim Hee-jin; Park Na-yeon; Song Jung-a; Kim Mi-jeong
Thailand	Vietnam		
Areerat Takan; Nitinadda Kaewkamsai; Nittaya Tukaew; Anchalee Suvanmajo; Nisa Thanaattawut; Tidawan Daosakul; Payom Srihongsa; Pinporn Klongbungkar; Phutsadi Suancharun; Sahattiya Faksra; Chotika Boonthong; Viparat Ruangrat	Nguyễn Đức Thu Hiền; Lưu Thị Thanh; Nguyễn Thị Thúy An; Nguyễn Thị Hoa; Nguyễn Thị Bích Thủy; Nguyễn Thịnh Thu Ba; Nguyễn Hải Thảo; Lê Thị Hạnh; Đỗ Thị Thu Hiền; Cao Thị Yến; Nguyễn Bạch Vân		

== Results ==
All times are Arabia Standard Time (UTC+03:00)

=== Preliminary ===
==== Group X ====
Pos	Team	Pld	W	L	MF	MA	MD	Pts	Qualification
1	Thailand	2	2	0	6	0	+6	4	Semifinals
2	South Korea	2	1	1	3	3	0	2	Semifinals
3	India	2	0	2	0	6	−6	0	

Source: Official website

Date	Time		Score		Regu 1			Regu 2			Regu 3		
Date	Time		Score		Set 1	Set 2	Set 3	Set 1	Set 2	Set 3	Set 1	Set 2	Set 3
02 Dec	12:00	Thailand	3–0	South Korea	2–0			2–0			2–0		
02 Dec	12:00	Thailand	3–0	South Korea	21–18	21–9		21–12	21–7		21–6	21–9	
03 Dec	12:00	Thailand	3–0	India	2–0			2–0			2–0		
03 Dec	12:00	Thailand	3–0	India	21–5	21–5		21–4	21–4		21–2	21–4	
04 Dec	12:00	South Korea	3–0	India	2–0			2–0			2–0		
04 Dec	12:00	South Korea	3–0	India	21–6	21–9		21–6	21–12		21–6	21–14	

==== Group Y ====
Pos	Team	Pld	W	L	MF	MA	MD	Pts	Qualification
1	Vietnam	2	2	0	5	1	+4	4	Semifinals
2	China	2	1	1	4	2	+2	2	Semifinals
3	Japan	2	0	2	0	6	−6	0	

Source: Official website

Date	Time		Score		Regu 1			Regu 2			Regu 3		
Date	Time		Score		Set 1	Set 2	Set 3	Set 1	Set 2	Set 3	Set 1	Set 2	Set 3
02 Dec	12:00	Vietnam	3–0	Japan	2–0			2–0			2–0		
02 Dec	12:00	Vietnam	3–0	Japan	21–19	21–18		21–11	21–10		21–13	21–17	
03 Dec	12:00	Vietnam	2–1	China	0–2			2–1			2–0		
03 Dec	12:00	Vietnam	2–1	China	19–21	17–21		21–23	21–9	15–8	21–11	21–10	
04 Dec	12:00	China	3–0	Japan	2–1			2–0			2–1		
04 Dec	12:00	China	3–0	Japan	21–9	15–21	15–8	21–13	21–8		21–13	18–21	15–12

=== Knockout round ===
Semifinals
5 December
Thailand	2
China	1
5 December
Vietnam	3
South Korea	0

Final
6 December
Thailand	1
Vietnam	2

==== Semifinals ====
Date	Time		Score		Regu 1			Regu 2			Regu 3		
Date	Time		Score		Set 1	Set 2	Set 3	Set 1	Set 2	Set 3	Set 1	Set 2	Set 3
05 Dec	09:00	Thailand	2–1	China	2–0			0–2			2–0		
05 Dec	09:00	Thailand	2–1	China	21–5	21–4		17–21	16–21		21–11	21–8	
05 Dec	12:00	Vietnam	3–0	South Korea	2–0			2–0			2–0		
05 Dec	12:00	Vietnam	3–0	South Korea	21–10	21–9		21–12	21–11		21–11	21–15	

==== Final ====
Date	Time		Score		Regu 1			Regu 2			Regu 3		
Date	Time		Score		Set 1	Set 2	Set 3	Set 1	Set 2	Set 3	Set 1	Set 2	Set 3
06 Dec	12:00	Thailand	1–2	Vietnam	1–2			2–0			1–2		
06 Dec	12:00	Thailand	1–2	Vietnam	21–13	14–21	11–15	21–12	21–15		21–12	15–21	11–15
