= Sailing at the 2010 Asian Games – Women's Mistral =

Women's Mistral at the 2010 Asian Games
- Venue: Shanwei Water Sports Center
- Date: 14–20 November 2010
- Competitors: 5 from 5 nations

Medalists
gold medal	Wang Ning	China
silver medal	Hayley Chan	Hong Kong
bronze medal	Napalai Tansai	Thailand

The women's Mistral competition at the 2010 Asian Games in Shanwei was held from 14 to 20 November 2010.

== Schedule ==
All times are China Standard Time (UTC+08:00)

Date	Time	Event
Sunday, 14 November 2010	12:00	Race 1
Sunday, 14 November 2010	12:00	Race 2
Monday, 15 November 2010	12:00	Race 3
Monday, 15 November 2010	12:00	Race 4
Tuesday, 16 November 2010	12:00	Race 5
Tuesday, 16 November 2010	12:00	Race 6
Wednesday, 17 November 2010	12:00	Race 7
Wednesday, 17 November 2010	12:00	Race 8
Friday, 19 November 2010	12:00	Race 9
Saturday, 20 November 2010	12:00	Race 10
Saturday, 20 November 2010	12:00	Race 11
Saturday, 20 November 2010	12:00	Race 12

== Results ==
Legend

- DNF — Did not finish
- RAF — Retired after finishing

Rank	Athlete	Race												Total
Rank	Athlete	1	2	3	4	5	6	7	8	9	10	11	12	Total
1st place, gold medalist(s)	Wang Ning (CHN)	2	1	1	1	1	1	1	~~(6)~~; RAF	1	1	1	2	13
2nd place, silver medalist(s)	Hayley Chan (HKG)	1	~~(3)~~	2	2	2	2	3	1	2	3	2	1	21
3rd place, bronze medalist(s)	Napalai Tansai (THA)	~~(3)~~	2	3	3	3	3	2	2	3	2	3	3	29
4	Hoiriyah (INA)	~~(4)~~	4	4	4	4	4	4	4	4	4	4	4	44
5	Koe Sin Yee (MAS)	5	5	~~(6)~~; DNF	6 DNF	5	5	5	3	5	5	5	5	54
