= Rajesh Choudhary =

Personal information
- Nationality: India

Sailing career
- Sport: Sailing
- Class: Laser Radial
Medal record
Men's sailing
Representing India
Asian Games
Bronze medal – third place	2002 Busan	Laser Radial
Bronze medal – third place	2006 Doha	Laser Radial

Rajesh Choudhary is an Indian sports sailor. He won bronze medals in the 2002 Busan and 2006 Doha Asian Games in the Laser Radial class.
