= Sailing at the 2010 Asian Games – Women's RS:X =

Women's RS:X at the 2010 Asian Games
- Venue: Shanwei Water Sports Center
- Date: 14–20 November 2010
- Competitors: 5 from 5 nations

Medalists
gold medal	Sun Sasa	China
silver medal	Chan Wai Kei	Hong Kong
bronze medal	Sarocha Prumprai	Thailand

The women's RS:X competition at the 2010 Asian Games in Shanwei was held from 14 to 20 November 2010.

== Schedule ==
All times are China Standard Time (UTC+08:00)

Date	Time	Event
Sunday, 14 November 2010	12:00	Race 1
Sunday, 14 November 2010	12:00	Race 2
Monday, 15 November 2010	12:00	Race 3
Monday, 15 November 2010	12:00	Race 4
Tuesday, 16 November 2010	12:00	Race 5
Tuesday, 16 November 2010	12:00	Race 6
Wednesday, 17 November 2010	12:00	Race 7
Wednesday, 17 November 2010	12:00	Race 8
Friday, 19 November 2010	12:00	Race 9
Saturday, 20 November 2010	12:00	Race 10
Saturday, 20 November 2010	12:00	Race 11
Saturday, 20 November 2010	12:00	Race 12

== Results ==
Legend

- DNF — Did not finish
- RAF — Retired after finishing

Rank	Athlete	Race												Total
Rank	Athlete	1	2	3	4	5	6	7	8	9	10	11	12	Total
1st place, gold medalist(s)	Sun Sasa (CHN)	1	1	1	1	~~(2)~~	1	1	1	1	2	1	2	13
2nd place, silver medalist(s)	Chan Wai Kei (HKG)	~~(2)~~	2	2	2	1	2	2	2	2	1	2	1	19
3rd place, bronze medalist(s)	Sarocha Prumprai (THA)	3	3	3	~~(6)~~; DNF	3	3	3	3	3	3	3	3	33
4	Ratiah (INA)	5	~~(6)~~; RAF	6 DNF	6 DNF	4	4	4	4	4	5	4	5	51
5	Geh Cheow Lin (MAS)	4	~~(6)~~; DNF	6 DNF	6 DNF	5	5	5	5	5	4	5	4	54
