= Wushu at the 2006 Asian Games – Men's sanshou 52 kg =

Men's sanshou 52 kg at the 2006 Asian Games
- Venue: Aspire Hall 3
- Dates: 11–14 December 2006
- Competitors: 15 from 15 nations

Medalists
gold medal	Rene Catalan	Philippines
silver medal	Phan Quốc Vinh	Vietnam
bronze medal	Naji Al-Ashwal	Yemen
bronze medal	Khwanyuen Chanthra	Thailand

The men's sanshou 52 kilograms at the 2006 Asian Games in Doha, Qatar was held from 11 to 14 December at the Aspire Hall 3 in Aspire Zone.

A total of fifteen competitors from fifteen countries competed in this event, limited to fighters whose body weight was less than 52 kilograms.

Rene Catalan from the Philippines won the gold medal after beating Phan Quốc Vinh of Vietnam in gold medal bout 2–0.

== Schedule ==
All times are Arabia Standard Time (UTC+03:00)

Date	Time	Event
Monday, 11 December 2006	15:30	Preliminary
Tuesday, 12 December 2006	14:00	Quarterfinals
Wednesday, 13 December 2006	16:00	Semifinals
Thursday, 14 December 2006	15:00	Final

== Results ==
Legend

- AV — Absolute victory
- KO — Won by knockout

Preliminary
Chao Chi Meng (MAC)	2
Raj Kumar Rasaili (NEP)	1
Utkir Hudoyarov (KGZ)	0
Rene Catalan (PHI)	2
Mntsar Al-Mhid (SYR)	0
Phoukhong Khamsounthone (LAO)	2
Phan Quốc Vinh (VIE)	2
Wong Ting Hong (HKG)	0
Yang Tsai-yu (TPE)	0
Woo Seung-soo (KOR)	2
Ali Fathi (IRI)	1
Khwanyuen Chanthra (THA)	2
Almas Sakayev (KAZ)	0
Naresh Kumar Sharma (IND)	2

Quarterfinals
Naji Al-Ashwal (YEM)	2
Chao Chi Meng (MAC)	0
Rene Catalan (PHI)	AV
Phoukhong Khamsounthone (LAO)
Phan Quốc Vinh (VIE)	2
Woo Seung-soo (KOR)	0
Khwanyuen Chanthra (THA)	KO
Naresh Kumar Sharma (IND)

Semifinals
Naji Al-Ashwal (YEM)	0
Rene Catalan (PHI)	2
Phan Quốc Vinh (VIE)	2
Khwanyuen Chanthra (THA)	0

Final
Rene Catalan (PHI)	2
Phan Quốc Vinh (VIE)	0
