= Chan Wai Kei =

Hong Kong windsurfer (born 1981)

Medal record

Women's sailing

Representing Hong Kong

Asian Games
Silver medal – second place	2006 Doha	Mistral
Silver medal – second place	2010 Guangzhou	RS:X

Chan Wai Kei (Chinese: 陳慧琪; Jyutping: can^{4} wai^{3} kei^{4}; born 19 March 1981), also known as Vicky Chan, is a sailor from Hong Kong who won a silver medal at the 2006 Asian Games in the mistral class. She also competed in the windsurfing event at the 2008 Beijing Olympics, finishing in 9th position.
