= Bodybuilding at the 2006 Asian Games – Men's 75 kg =

Men's 75 kg at the 2006 Asian Games
- Venue: Al-Dana Banquet Hall
- Date: 8 December 2006
- Competitors: 9 from 9 nations

Medalists
| gold medal | Chan Yun To | Hong Kong |
| silver medal | Yoshihiro Yano | Japan |
| bronze medal | Mohd Ismail Muhammad | Singapore |

The men's 75 kilograms event at the 2006 Asian Games was held on December 8, 2006 at the Al-Dana Banquet Hall in Doha, Qatar.

== Schedule ==
All times are Arabia Standard Time (UTC+03:00)

| Date | Time | Event |
|---|---|---|
| Friday, 8 December 2006 | 12:15 | Prejudging round |
| Friday, 8 December 2006 | 18:05 | Final round |

== Results ==
=== Prejudging round ===
| Rank | Athlete | Score |
|---|---|---|
| 1 | Chan Yun To (HKG) | 5 |
| 2 | Yoshihiro Yano (JPN) | 12 |
| 3 | Mohd Ismail Muhammad (SIN) | 20 |
| 4 | Kim Myung-sub (KOR) | 20 |
| 5 | Haji Shaban Al-Balushi (OMA) | 23 |
| 6 | Beitollah Abbaspour (IRI) | 26 |
| 7 | Ibrahim Salem Al-Zaabi (UAE) | 41 |
| 8 | Abdulwahab Al-Naemi (QAT) | 42 |
| DQ | Faez Abdul-Hassan (IRQ) | ~~36~~ |

- Faez Abdul-Hassan of Iraq originally finished 7th, but was disqualified after 134 ampoules of nandrolone were found in his luggage at Doha International Airport.

=== Final round ===
| Rank | Athlete | Prej. | Final | Total |
|---|---|---|---|---|
| 1st place, gold medalist(s) | Chan Yun To (HKG) | 5 | 5 | 10 |
| 2nd place, silver medalist(s) | Yoshihiro Yano (JPN) | 12 | 15 | 27 |
| 3rd place, bronze medalist(s) | Mohd Ismail Muhammad (SIN) | 20 | 17 | 37 |
| 4 | Kim Myung-sub (KOR) | 20 | 17 | 37 |
| 5 | Haji Shaban Al-Balushi (OMA) | 23 | 20 | 43 |
