= Sailing at the 2006 Asian Games – Laser Radial =

Open Laser Radial at the 2006 Asian Games
- Venue: Doha Sailing Club
- Date: 5–12 December 2006
- Competitors: 11 from 11 nations

Medalists
gold medal	Xu Lijia	China
silver medal	Koh Seng Leong	Singapore
bronze medal	Rajesh Choudhary	India

The open Laser Radial competition at the 2006 Asian Games in Doha was held from 5 to 12 December 2006.

== Schedule ==
All times are Arabia Standard Time (UTC+03:00)

Date	Time	Event
Tuesday, 5 December 2006	11:00	Race 1
Wednesday, 6 December 2006	11:00	Race 2
Thursday, 7 December 2006	11:00	Race 3
Thursday, 7 December 2006	11:00	Race 4
Thursday, 7 December 2006	11:00	Race 5
Friday, 8 December 2006	11:00	Race 6
Friday, 8 December 2006	11:00	Race 7
Friday, 8 December 2006	11:00	Race 8
Sunday, 10 December 2006	11:00	Race 9
Monday, 11 December 2006	11:00	Race 10
Monday, 11 December 2006	11:00	Race 11
Tuesday, 12 December 2006	11:00	Race 12

== Results ==
Legend

- DNC — Did not come to the starting area
- DNF — Did not finish
- DSQ — Disqualification
- OCS — On course side

Rank	Athlete	Race												Total
Rank	Athlete	1	2	3	4	5	6	7	8	9	10	11	12	Total
1st place, gold medalist(s)	Xu Lijia (CHN)	1	5	2	3	4	2	1	1	~~(8)~~	7	2	3	31
2nd place, silver medalist(s)	Koh Seng Leong (SIN)	3	4	4	4	5	1	5	2	~~(7)~~	3	1	1	33
3rd place, bronze medalist(s)	Rajesh Choudhary (IND)	5	2	3	1	2	3	4	3	~~(6)~~	1	5	4	33
4	Mohd Romzi Mohamad (MAS)	6	1	1	2	3	4	2	~~(12)~~; OCS	1	5	4	5	34
5	Kim Sang-kyu (KOR)	2	~~(12)~~; DSQ	6	6	1	12; OCS	3	4	3	4	3	2	46
6	Abdulla Janahi (BRN)	7	3	8	~~(9)~~	6	8	7	6	2	2	8	6	63
7	Hassan Al-Baker (QAT)	4	7	5	8	7	6	6	5	5	8	6	~~(9)~~	67
8	Ruslan Jangazov (KAZ)	~~(9)~~	6	7	7	8	7	9	7	4	6	7	8	76
9	Ashfaq Iqbal (PAK)	8	~~(12)~~; DNF	10	5	9	5	8	8	10	9	9	7	88
10	Krishan Janaka (SRI)	10	8	9	10	10	9	10	9	9	10	10	~~(12)~~; DNC	104
11	Sami Abdulsalam (KUW)	~~(12)~~; DNF	12; DNF	12; DNF	11	11	10	11	10	12; DNF	12; DNC	12; DNC	12; DNC	125
