= Sailing at the 2006 Asian Games – Boys' Optimist =

Boys' Optimist at the 2006 Asian Games
- Venue: Doha Sailing Club
- Date: 5–12 December 2006
- Competitors: 11 from 11 nations

Medalists
gold medal	Ni Wei	China
silver medal	Navee Thamsoontorn	Thailand
bronze medal	Sean Lee	Singapore

The boys' Optimist competition at the 2006 Asian Games in Doha was held from 5 to 12 December 2006. It was an under-16 event and sailors born in or after 1991 were eligible to compete.

== Schedule ==
All times are Arabia Standard Time (UTC+03:00)

Date	Time	Event
Tuesday, 5 December 2006	11:00	Race 1
Wednesday, 6 December 2006	11:00	Race 2
Thursday, 7 December 2006	11:00	Race 3
Thursday, 7 December 2006	11:00	Race 4
Thursday, 7 December 2006	11:00	Race 5
Friday, 8 December 2006	11:00	Race 6
Friday, 8 December 2006	11:00	Race 7
Friday, 8 December 2006	11:00	Race 8
Sunday, 10 December 2006	11:00	Race 9
Sunday, 10 December 2006	11:00	Race 10
Monday, 11 December 2006	11:00	Race 11
Tuesday, 12 December 2006	11:00	Race 12

== Results ==
Legend

- DNF — Did not finish
- DSQ — Disqualification
- OCS — On course side

Rank	Athlete	Race												Total
Rank	Athlete	1	2	3	4	5	6	7	8	9	10	11	12	Total
1st place, gold medalist(s)	Ni Wei (CHN)	2	1	1	2	1	1	1	2	1	1	1	~~(3)~~	14
2nd place, silver medalist(s)	Navee Thamsoontorn (THA)	5	3	2	1	2	4	3	3	2	2	~~(12)~~; OCS	6	33
3rd place, bronze medalist(s)	Sean Lee (SIN)	8	7	5	3	3	2	2	1	4	4	~~(12)~~; OCS	2	41
4	Faizani Yahya (MAS)	1	6	3	6	5	~~(8)~~	5	5	3	6	2	4	46
5	Tetsuya Isozaki (JPN)	10	2	4	4	6	5	4	4	5	3	~~(12)~~; DSQ	1	48
6	Hassan Al-Tamimi (QAT)	9	4	6	~~(12)~~; DNF	4	3	6	12; DNF	6	5	3	5	63
7	Xerxes Bamboat (IND)	4	5	9	5	8	7	8	6	9	~~(10)~~	7	7	75
8	Park Min-hyeo (KOR)	6	8	~~(10)~~	7	7	9	7	9	8	7	6	10	84
9	Omar Ahmed Abdulla (BRN)	~~(11)~~	9	7	9	10	10	9	7	7	9	4	9	90
10	Devin Gunawardene (SRI)	7	~~(11)~~	8	8	9	6	10	8	11	11	5	8	91
11	Muhammad Abdur Rehman (PAK)	3	10	~~(11)~~	10	11	11	11	10	10	8	8	11	103
