= Sailing at the 2006 Asian Games – Women's Mistral =

Women's Mistral at the 2006 Asian Games
- Venue: Doha Sailing Club
- Date: 5–11 December 2006
- Competitors: 5 from 5 nations

Medalists
gold medal	Chen Lina	China
silver medal	Chan Wai Kei	Hong Kong
bronze medal	Napalai Tansai	Thailand

The women's Mistral competition at the 2006 Asian Games in Doha was held from 5 to 11 December 2006.

== Schedule ==
All times are Arabia Standard Time (UTC+03:00)

Date	Time	Event
Tuesday, 5 December 2006	11:00	Race 1
Tuesday, 5 December 2006	11:00	Race 2
Wednesday, 6 December 2006	11:00	Race 3
Thursday, 7 December 2006	11:00	Race 4
Thursday, 7 December 2006	11:00	Race 5
Friday, 8 December 2006	11:00	Race 6
Friday, 8 December 2006	11:00	Race 7
Monday, 11 December 2006	11:00	Race 8
Monday, 11 December 2006	11:00	Race 9

== Results ==
Legend

- OCS — On course side

Rank	Athlete	Race									Total
Rank	Athlete	1	2	3	4	5	6	7	8	9	Total
1st place, gold medalist(s)	Chen Lina (CHN)	~~(3)~~	3	2	1	1	1	1	1	2	12
2nd place, silver medalist(s)	Chan Wai Kei (HKG)	1	1	1	~~(2)~~	2	2	2	2	1	12
3rd place, bronze medalist(s)	Napalai Tansai (THA)	~~(5)~~	5	3	3	3	3	3	3	3	26
4	Fujiko Onishi (JPN)	2	2	4	4	4	4	~~(6)~~; OCS	4	5	29
5	Shin Ji-hyun (KOR)	4	4	~~(5)~~	5	5	5	4	5	4	36
