= Chan Yun To =

Hong Kong bodybuilder

- Chinese: 陳潤韜
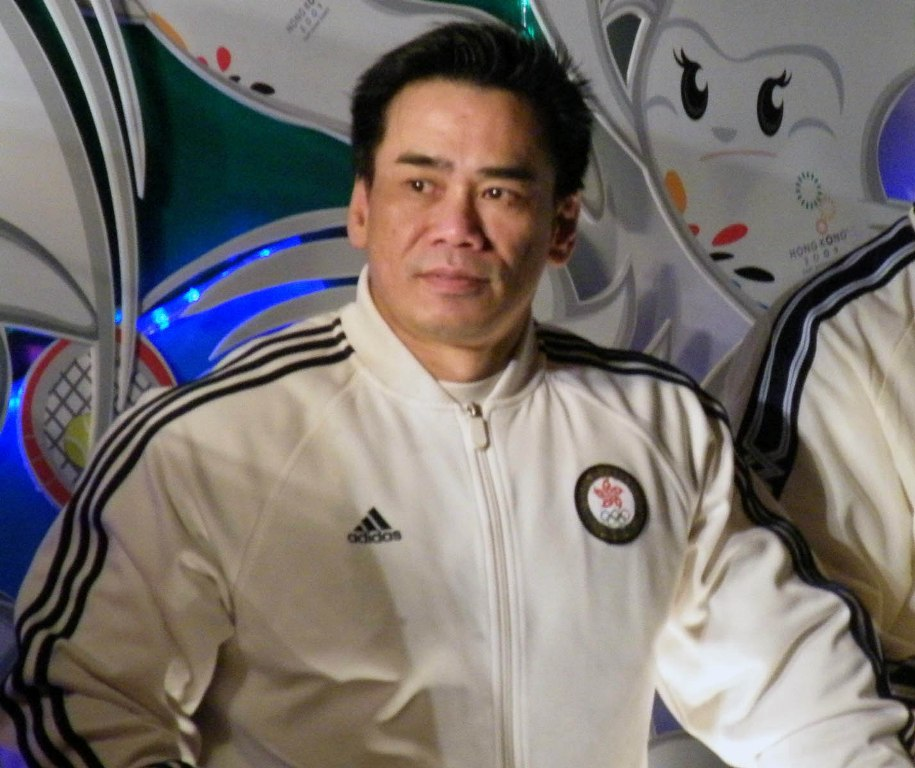
- Chan at 2009 Chinese New Year Night Parade
- Born: 21 February 1966 (age 59)
- Occupation: Olympian Body Builder

Chan Yun To
Medal record

Men's Bodybuilding

Asian Games
| Gold medal – first place | 2006 Doha | -75 kg |

Chan Yun To (Chinese: 陳潤韜; Jyutping: can^{4} jeon^{6} tou^{1}; born 21 February 1966) is a bodybuilder from Hong Kong who won a gold medal at the 2006 Asian Games in the men's -75 kg class.
