= Sailing at the 2006 Asian Games – Hobie 16 =

Open Hobie 16 at the 2006 Asian Games
- Venue: Doha Sailing Club
- Date: 5–13 December 2006
- Competitors: 14 from 7 nations

Medalists
gold medal	Damrongsak Vongtim; Sakda Vongtim	Thailand
silver medal	Park Kyu-tae; Sung Chang-il	South Korea
bronze medal	Melcolm Huang; Chung Pei Quan	Singapore

The open Hobie 16 competition at the 2006 Asian Games in Doha was held from 5 to 13 December 2006.

== Schedule ==
All times are Arabia Standard Time (UTC+03:00)

Date	Time	Event
Tuesday, 5 December 2006	11:00	Race 1
Tuesday, 5 December 2006	11:00	Race 2
Wednesday, 6 December 2006	11:00	Race 3
Thursday, 7 December 2006	11:00	Race 4
Thursday, 7 December 2006	11:00	Race 5
Thursday, 7 December 2006	11:00	Race 6
Friday, 8 December 2006	11:00	Race 7
Friday, 8 December 2006	11:00	Race 8
Friday, 8 December 2006	11:00	Race 9
Monday, 11 December 2006	11:00	Race 10
Monday, 11 December 2006	11:00	Race 11
Wednesday, 13 December 2006	11:00	Race 12

== Results ==
Legend

- DNC — Did not come to the starting area

Rank	Team	Race												Total
Rank	Team	1	2	3	4	5	6	7	8	9	10	11	12	Total
1st place, gold medalist(s)	Thailand (THA); Damrongsak Vongtim; Sakda Vongtim	2	1	~~(3)~~	2	1	2	2	1	2	3	1	2	19
2nd place, silver medalist(s)	South Korea (KOR); Park Kyu-tae; Sung Chang-il	~~(4)~~	2	2	1	2	1	3	3	4	1	3	1	23
3rd place, bronze medalist(s)	Singapore (SIN); Melcolm Huang; Chung Pei Quan	1	3	~~(4)~~	3	3	3	1	2	1	2	2	4	25
4	Hong Kong (HKG); Tong Yui Shing; Lo Kin Yee	3	~~(4)~~	1	4	4	4	4	4	3	4	4	3	38
5	Kazakhstan (KAZ); Galymzhan Darigul; Magomet Dalakov	5	5	5	~~(6)~~	6	5	6	5	6	6	6	6	61
6	Oman (OMA); Safyia Al-Habsi; Fasial Al-Riyami	6	6	6	5	5	6	5	7	7	5	~~(8)~~; DNC	7	65
7	Qatar (QAT); Amro Shouhdy; Ali Al-Tamimi	~~(7)~~	7	7	7	7	7	7	6	5	7	5	5	70
