= Bodybuilding at the 2006 Asian Games – Men's 80 kg =

Men's 80 kg at the 2006 Asian Games
- Venue: Al-Dana Banquet Hall
- Date: 9 December 2006
- Competitors: 12 from 12 nations

Medalists
gold medal	Sitthi Charoenrith	Thailand
silver medal	Mohamed Sabah	Bahrain
bronze medal	Lee Do-hee	South Korea

The men's 80 kilograms event at the 2006 Asian Games was held on December 9, 2006 at the Al-Dana Banquet Hall in Doha, Qatar.

== Schedule ==
All times are Arabia Standard Time (UTC+03:00)

Date	Time	Event
Saturday, 9 December 2006	10:00	Prejudging round
Saturday, 9 December 2006	16:00	Final round

== Results ==
=== Prejudging round ===
Rank	Athlete	Score
1	Sitthi Charoenrith (THA)	6
2	Mohamed Sabah (BRN)	9
3	Lee Do-hee (KOR)	15
4	Liaw Teck Leong (MAS)	26
5	Salem Ghanem Al-Shamsi (UAE)	~~27~~
6	Rezk Khalil (SYR)	29
7	Chan Ka Chun (HKG)	30
8	Abbas Agheli (IRI)	41
9	Giáp Trí Dũng (VIE)	50
10	Asaad Hamid (IRQ)	50
11	Koichi Aikawa (JPN)	52
12	Ahmed Al-Harthi (OMA)	53

=== Final round ===
Rank	Athlete	Prej.	Final	Total
1st place, gold medalist(s)	Sitthi Charoenrith (THA)	6	7	13
2nd place, silver medalist(s)	Mohamed Sabah (BRN)	9	8	17
3rd place, bronze medalist(s)	Lee Do-hee (KOR)	15	15	30
4	Liaw Teck Leong (MAS)	26	22	48
DQ	Salem Ghanem Al-Shamsi (UAE)	27	23	~~50~~

- Salem Ghanem Al-Shamsi of the United Arab Emirates originally finished 5th, but was disqualified after he failed the drug test.
