= Napalai Tansai =

Thai windsurfer

Medal record

Women's sailing

Representing Thailand

Asian Games
Bronze medal – third place	2006 Doha	Mistral
Bronze medal – third place	2010 Guangzhou	Mistral

Southeast Asian Games
Silver medal – second place	2011 Jakarta-Palembang	Mistral

Napalai Tansai (born 20 May 1982 in Chonburi) is a Thai windsurfer. She has competed at three Olympics, at the 2000, 2008 and 2012 Summer Olympics. In 2000, sailing in the Mistral One class, she finished in 19th place. The Mistral class was replaced with the RS:X class in which she finished in 20th place in 2008 and 24th place in 2012.
