= Sailing at the 2006 Asian Games – Girls' 420 =

Girls' 420 at the 2006 Asian Games
- Venue: Doha Sailing Club
- Date: 5–13 December 2006
- Competitors: 8 from 4 nations

Medalists
gold medal	Sarah Tan; Lim Tze Ting	Singapore
silver medal	Yumi Takahashi; Kae Tsugaya	Japan
bronze medal	Su Sandar Wai; Zin April Aung	Myanmar

The girls' 420 competition at the 2006 Asian Games in Doha was held from 5 to 13 December 2006. It was an under-19 event and sailors born in or after 1988 were eligible to compete.

== Schedule ==
All times are Arabia Standard Time (UTC+03:00)

Date	Time	Event
Tuesday, 5 December 2006	11:00	Race 1
Thursday, 7 December 2006	11:00	Race 2
Thursday, 7 December 2006	11:00	Race 3
Thursday, 7 December 2006	11:00	Race 4
Friday, 8 December 2006	11:00	Race 5
Friday, 8 December 2006	11:00	Race 6
Friday, 8 December 2006	11:00	Race 7
Sunday, 10 December 2006	11:00	Race 8
Sunday, 10 December 2006	11:00	Race 9
Sunday, 10 December 2006	11:00	Race 10
Monday, 11 December 2006	11:00	Race 11
Wednesday, 13 December 2006	11:00	Race 12

== Results ==
Rank	Team	Race												Total
Rank	Team	1	2	3	4	5	6	7	8	9	10	11	12	Total
1st place, gold medalist(s)	Singapore (SIN); Sarah Tan; Lim Tze Ting	1	1	1	1	1	1	1	2	1	1	~~(3)~~	1	12
2nd place, silver medalist(s)	Japan (JPN); Yumi Takahashi; Kae Tsugaya	~~(3)~~	3	2	2	2	2	2	3	2	2	1	3	24
3rd place, bronze medalist(s)	Myanmar (MYA); Su Sandar Wai; Zin April Aung	2	2	~~(3)~~	3	3	3	3	1	3	3	2	2	27
4	Pakistan (PAK); Ujala Mir Masood; Maria Sahr	~~(4)~~	4	4	4	4	4	4	4	4	4	4	4	44
