= Koh Seng Leong =

Singaporean sailor (born 1983)

Personal information
- Full name: Joseph Koh Seng Leong
- Nationality: Singapore
- Born: 19 September 1983 (age 42) Singapore
- Height: 1.76 m (5 ft 9 1/2 in)
- Weight: 71 kg (157 lb)

Sailing career
- Sport: Sailing
- Club: SAF Yachting Club
- Coached by: Brett Beyer (AUS)
- Class: Dinghy
Medal record
Men's sailing
Representing Singapore
Asian Games
Silver medal – second place	2006 Doha	Laser Radial
Southeast Asian Games
Silver medal – second place	2007 Bangkok	Laser

Joseph Koh Seng Leong (born 19 September 1983) is a Singaporean former sailor, who specialized in the Laser and 470 classes. He represented Singapore across two editions of the Summer Olympic Games (2000 and 2008), finishing outside the top twenty-five each in two separate boats, respectively. Outside Olympic career, Koh collected a total of two medals in a continental regatta, spanning the 2006 Asian Games in Doha and the 2007 Southeast Asian Games in Nakhon Ratchasima. Koh trained throughout his sporting career at SAF Yachting Club in Changi, under the tutelage of his personal coach Brett Beyer, a six-time Laser Apprentice Master world champion from Australia.

At the age of 16, Koh became the youngest sailor to compete in Sydney 2000. There, he and his partner Tan Wearn Haw finished twenty-eighth in the men's 470 class with a net grade of 192, sparing them from the back of the fleet by a twelve-point edge over the Hungarian duo of Marcell Goszleth and Ádám Szőrényi. Switching to a single-handed dinghy, Koh sought to bid in the open Laser for Athens 2004, but he lost the selection to two-time Olympian Stanley Tan. In 2005, Koh had his left hand fractured in a freak motorbike accident, impelling him to sail a boat in the forthcoming regattas with a modified technique.

Eight years after competing in his maiden Games, Koh qualified for his second Singaporean team, as a 24-year-old, in the Laser class at the 2008 Summer Olympics in Beijing. He finished twenty-third out of 52 sailors in the silver fleet to lock one of the ten quota places available at the Worlds six months earlier in Terrigal, New South Wales. Koh stayed in the middle of the fleet throughout the series, until he chased harder to finish third on the penultimate leg by a few marks ahead of Poland's Maciej Grabowski. Koh's best result, however, was not enough to reach the top of the overall scoreboard, sitting him in thirty-sixth with 239 net points.
