= Ashok Shandilya =

Indian billiards player

Personal information
- Nationality: India
- Born: 30 November 1968 (age 57)
Medal record
English billiards
Representing India
Asian Games
Gold medal – first place	1998 Bangkok	English billiards singles
Gold medal – first place	1998 Bangkok	English billiards doubles
Silver medal – second place	2006 Doha	English billiards singles
Bronze medal – third place	2006 Doha	doubles

Ashok Shandilya is an Indian billiards player.He plays from Indian Railways (Central Railway). He has been the coach of the National Billiards Teams of India to many Championships across the World. He won the IBSF World Billiards Championship in 2002, and was runner-up in 1990, 1997, 2001, and 2007.

== Career ==
He won the 2002 Asian Billiards Championship, defeating 16-year old Pankaj Advani by 5:4.
