= Shibuki Iitsuka =

Japanese sailor (born 1988)

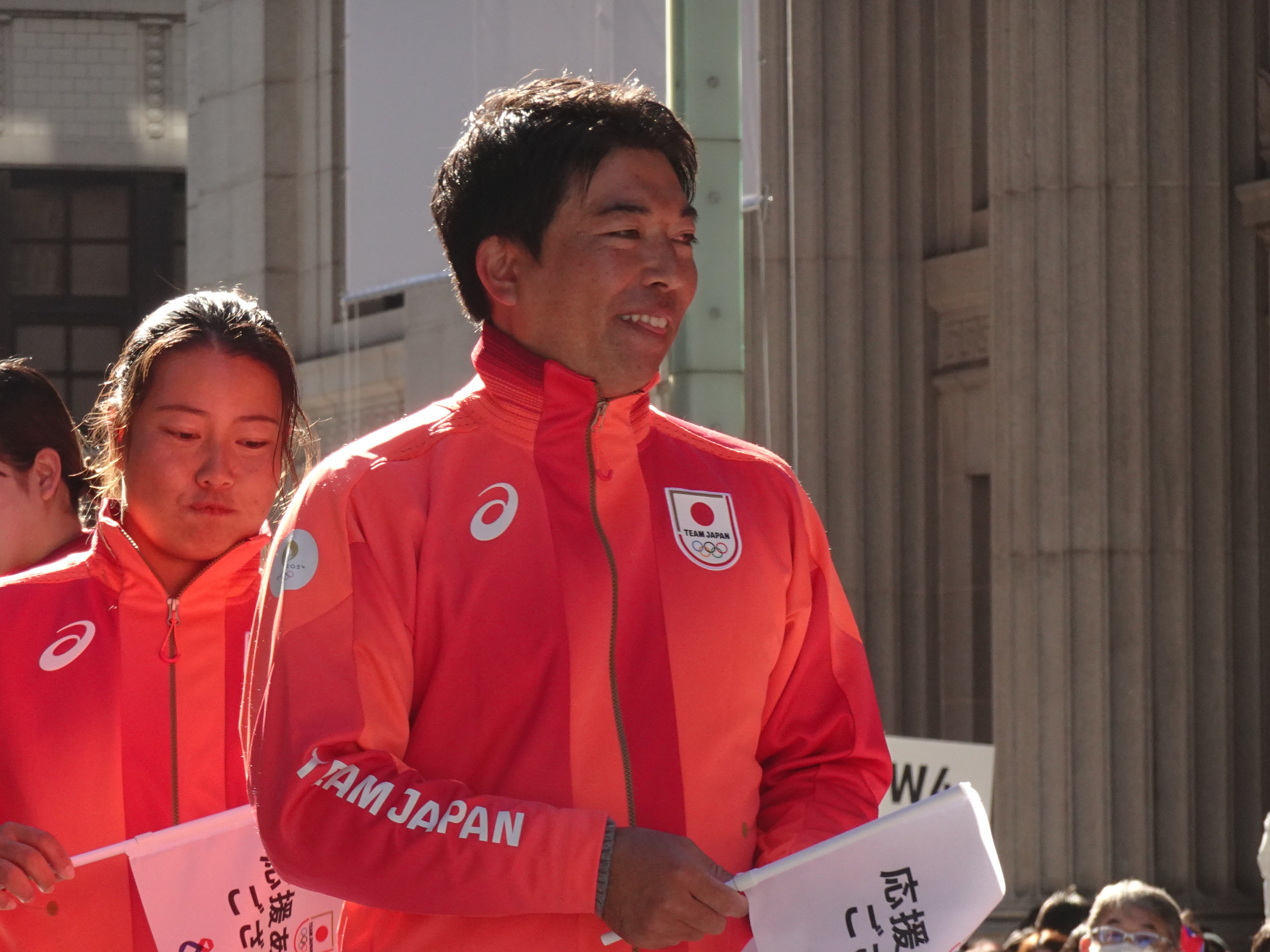
- On November 30th, 2024 in Tokyo, Japan

Personal information
- Nationality: Japanese
- Born: 23 August 1988 (age 38) Yokohama, Japan

Sailing career
- Sport: Sailing
- Class: Nacra 17

Shibuki Iitsuka (Japanese: 飯束 潮吹, born 23 August 1988) is a Japanese sailor. He competed in the Nacra 17 event at the 2020 Summer Olympics.
