= Thailand at the 2006 Asian Games =

- IOC code: THA
- NOC: National Olympic Committee of Thailand
- Website: www.olympicthai.or.th/eng (in English and Thai)

in Doha
- Flag bearer: Supachai Jitjumroon
- Medals Ranked 5th: Gold 13 Silver 15 Bronze 26 Total 54

Asian Games appearances (overview)
- 1951; 1954; 1958; 1962; 1966; 1970; 1974; 1978; 1982; 1986; 1990; 1994; 1998; 2002; 2006; 2010; 2014; 2018; 2022; 2026

Thailand participated in the 2006 Asian Games held in Doha, Qatar from 1–15 December 2006. Thailand ended the games at 54 overall medals including 13 gold medals.

== Medalists ==
Medal	Name	Sport	Event	Date
Gold	Thanyalak Chotpaibunsin; Supamas Wankaew; Paramaporn Ponglaokham	Shooting	Women's 50 metre rifle prone team	4 Dec
Gold	Pawina Thongsuk	Weightlifting	Women's 63 kg	4 Dec
Gold	Sakol Jandoung; Suebsak Phunsueb; Panomporn Aiemsaard; Sarawut Inlek; Pornchai Kaokaew; Rangsirod Sirisamutsarn; Worapot Thongsai; Terdsak Pilae; Somporn Jaisinghol; Suriyan Peachan; Singha Somsakul; Prasert Pongpung	Sepak takraw	Men's team regu	6 Dec
Gold	Praprut Chaithanasakun; Udon Khaimuk	Cue sports	Men's English billiards doubles	7 Dec
Gold	Buoban Pamang	Athletics	Women's javelin throw	9 Dec
Gold	Sitthi Charoenrith	Bodybuilding	80 kg	9 Dec
Gold	Areerat Takan; Nitinadda Kaewkamsai; Tidawan Daosakul; Pinporn Klongbungkar; Phutsadi Suancharun	Sepak takraw	Women's regu	10 Dec
Gold	Suebsak Phunsueb; Panomporn Aiemsaard; Pornchai Kaokaew; Somporn Jaisinghol; Singha Somsakul	Sepak takraw	Men's regu	10 Dec
Gold	Manus Boonjumnong	Boxing	Light welterweight	12 Dec
Gold	Seksan Wongsala; Wachara Sondee; Ekkachai Janthana; Sittichai Suwonprateep	Athletics	Men's 4 × 100 metres relay	12 Dec
Gold	Damrongsak Vongtim; Sakda Vongtim	Sailing	Hobie 16	13 Dec
Gold	Rawat Parbchompoo; Purich Pansira; Rattikorn Pealun	Sepak takraw	Men's doubles	13 Dec
Gold	Danai Udomchoke	Tennis	Men's singles	14 Dec
Silver	Pensiri Laosirikul	Weightlifting	Women's 48 kg	2 Dec
Silver	Junpim Kuntatean	Weightlifting	Women's 53 kg	2 Dec
Silver	Wandee Kameaim	Weightlifting	Women's 58 kg	3 Dec
Silver	Thanyalak Chotphibunsin	Shooting	Women's 50 metre rifle prone	4 Dec
Silver	Janejira Srisongkram	Shooting	Women's double trap	5 Dec
Silver	Ruthtanaphol Theppibal; Anupong Thainjam	Rowing	Men's lightweight double sculls	6 Dec
Silver	Areerat Takan; Nitinadda Kaewkamsai; Nittaya Tukaew; Anchalee Suvanmajo; Nisa Thanaattawut; Tidawan Daosakul; Payom Srihongsa; Pinporn Klongbungkar; Phutsadi Suancharun; Sahattiya Faksra; Chotika Boonthong; Viparat Ruangrat	Sepak takraw	Women's team regu	6 Dec
Silver	Vasavat Somswang	Taekwondo	Men's 54 kg	7 Dec
Silver	Dhunyanun Premwaew	Taekwondo	Women's 63 kg	7 Dec
Silver	Nattapong Tewawetchapong	Taekwondo	Men's 58 kg	8 Dec
Silver	Somjit Jongjohor	Boxing	Men's 51 kg	12 Dec
Silver	Navee Thamsoontorn	Sailing	Men's Optimist	12 Dec
Silver	Suban Pannon	Boxing	Men's 48 kg	13 Dec
Silver	Angkhan Chomphuphuang	Boxing	Men's 69 kg	13 Dec
Silver	Sanchai Ratiwatana; Sonchat Ratiwatana	Tennis	Men's doubles	13 Dec
Bronze	Thongyim Bunphithak	Weightlifting	Women's 48 kg	2 Dec
Bronze	Angkana Netrviseth	Bowling	Women's singles	3 Dec
Bronze	Atthasit Mahitthi; Phaitoon Phonbun	Cue sports	Men's snooker doubles	5 Dec
Bronze	Punnapa Asvanit; Supornpan Chewchalermmit; Janejira Srisongkram	Shooting	Women's double trap team	5 Dec
Bronze	Phuttharaksa Neegree; Bussayamas Phaengkathok	Rowing	Women's lightweight double sculls	6 Dec
Bronze	Annipa Moontar	Weightlifting	Women's +75 kg	6 Dec
Bronze	Atthasit Mahitthi	Cue sports	Men's snooker singles	7 Dec
Bronze	Ruthtanaphol Theppibal	Rowing	Men's lightweight single sculls	7 Dec
Bronze	Phuttharaksa Neegree	Rowing	Women's lightweight single sculls	7 Dec
Bronze	Pongpol Kulchairattana; Jakkrit Panichpatikum; Opas Ruengpanyawut	Shooting	Men's 25 metre standard pistol team	7 Dec
Bronze	Yaowapa Boorapolchai	Taekwondo	Women's 47 kg	7 Dec
Bronze	Yannaphon Larpapharat	Bowling	Men's all-events	8 Dec
Bronze	Sudket Prapakamol; Saralee Thungthongkam	Badminton	Mixed doubles	8 Dec
Bronze	Jakkrit Panichpatikum	Shooting	Men's 25 metre center fire pistol	8 Dec
Bronze	Natthaya Sangsasiton	Taekwondo	Women's 51 kg	8 Dec
Bronze	Sanchai Ratiwatana; Sonchat Ratiwatana; Paradorn Srichaphan; Danai Udomchoke	Tennis	Men's team	8 Dec
Bronze	Wachara Sondee	Athletics	Men's 100 metres	9 Dec
Bronze	Wiradech Kothny	Fencing	Men's individual sabre	10 Dec
Bronze	Arun Homraruen	Sailing	Men's Mistral light	11 Dec
Bronze	Napalai Tansai	Sailing	Women's Mistral	11 Dec
Bronze	Jittikan Tiemsurakan	Karate	Women's kumite 48 kg	12 Dec
Bronze	Benjamas Poonpat	Sailing	Women's Optimist	12 Dec
Bronze	Natee Kattancharoen; Ekkathet Ketiam; Wiradech Kothny; Sares Limkangwanmongkol	Fencing	Men's team sabre	13 Dec
Bronze	Worapoj Petchkoom	Boxing	Men's 54 kg	13 Dec
Bronze	Chanpeng Nontasin	Cycling	Women's points race	14 Dec
Bronze	Khwanyuen Chanthra	Wushu	Men's sanda 52 kg	14 Dec
