= China at the 2006 Asian Games =

- IOC code: CHN
- NOC: Chinese Olympic Committee external link (in Chinese and English)

in Doha
- Competitors: 647
- Flag bearer: Bao Chunlai
- Medals Ranked 1st: Gold 165 Silver 88 Bronze 63 Total 316

Asian Games appearances (overview)
- 1974; 1978; 1982; 1986; 1990; 1994; 1998; 2002; 2006; 2010; 2014; 2018; 2022; 2026

China competed in the 2006 Asian Games held in Doha, Qatar from December 1, 2006 to December 15, 2006. The team is composed of athletes from People's Republic of China only – each of China's two special administrative regions had its own team (with the designations 'Hong Kong, China' and 'Macau, China', respectively). China topped again the medal tally with 165 gold medals, which was the record amongst the Games as a non-host country at that time (before being surpassed also by China in the 2026 Asian Games).

== Participation details ==
=== Boxing ===
China was represented by 10 amateur boxing athletes competing for the 11 gold medals at stake in this edition of the Asiad. Half of the entry list qualified for the semifinal bouts.

==== Entry list ====
- Bantamweight - GU Yu
- Light Flyweight - HU Qing
- Heavyweight - LI Bin
- Welterweight - SILAMU Hanati
- Light Welterweight - XIA Wenjie
- Featherweight - XIE Long Wang
- Flyweight - YANG Bo
- Middleweight - ZHANG Jianting
- Light Heavyweight - ZHANG Xiaoping
- Light Flyweight - ZOU Shimming

==== Standings ====
Rank		Gold	Silver	Bronze	Total
2	China	2	0	3	5

==== Results ====
- Venue: ASPIRE Hall 5

Quarterfinal bouts December 7, 2006
Weight division	Corner-Name (NOC)	Winner	Points	Time/Decision
Flyweight	BLUE (China) YANG Bo (CHN); RED (South Korea) LEE Ok Sung (KOR)	BLUE	41:21	PTS
December 8, 2006
Light Flyweight	BLUE (China) ZOU Shiming (CHN); RED (India) KOLTE Sanjay Kisan (IND)	BLUE	25:5	RSCOS-R3
Middle Weight	BLUE (China) ZHANG Jianting (CHN); RED (Pakistan) BUX Allah (PAK)	BLUE	26:6	RSCOS-R3
December 9, 2006
Lightweight	BLUE (China) HU Qing (CHN); RED (Kyrgyzstan) TALASBAEV Asylbek (KGZ)	BLUE	28:8	RSCOS-R3
Welterweight	BLUE (China) SILAMU Hanati (CHN) (Uzbekistan) YUNUSOV Behzodbek (UZB)	BLUE	49:26	PTS
Semifinals; December 10, 2006
Flyweight	RED (China) YANG Bo (CHN); BLUE (Philippines) PAYLA Violito (PHI)	BLUE	20:40	RSCOS-R3
Middleweight	RED (China) ZHANG Jianting (CHN); BLUE (Uzbekistan) RASULOV Elshod (UZB)	BLUE	14:25	PTS
December 11, 2006
Light Flyweight	RED (China) ZOU Shiming (CHN); BLUE (South Korea) HONG Moo Won (KOR)	RED	17:9	PTS
Lightweight	RED (China) HU Qing (CHN) (Philippines) BASADRE Genebert (PHI)	RED	29:18	PTS
Welterweight	RED (China) SILAMU Hanati (CHN) (Kazakhstan) SARSEKBAYEV Bakhyt (KAZ)	BLUE	30:37	PTS
Finals; December 12, 2006

Legend:
PTS - Points, RSCOS - Referee Stop Contest Outscored, R - Round

== See also ==
- China at the Asian Games
- China at the Olympics
- Sports in China
