= Sailing at the 2018 Asian Games =

- Venue: Ancol Beach Marina
- Dates: 24–31 August 2018
- Competitors: 145 from 20 nations

Sailing at the 2018 Asian Games was held at the Ancol Beach Marina, Jakarta, Indonesia. It was held from 24 to 31 August 2018.

== Schedule ==
●	Round	●	Last round

Event↓/Date →	24th Fri	25th Sat	26th Sun	27th Mon	28th Tue	29th Wed	30th Thu	31st Fri
Men's RS:X	●●	●●●	●●●		●●●	●●●		●
Men's Laser	●●	●●●	●●		●●	●●		●
Men's 470	●●	●●●	●●		●●	●●		●
Men's 49er	●●	●●●	●●●		●●●	●●●		●
Women's RS:X	●●	●●●	●●●		●●●	●●●		●
Women's Laser Radial	●●	●●●	●●		●●	●●		●
Women's 470	●●	●●●	●●		●●	●●		●
Women's 49erFX	●●	●●●	●●●		●●●	●●●		●
Mixed RS:One team	●●	●●●	●●●	●●	●	●●●		●
Open Laser 4.7	●●	●●●	●●		●●	●●		●

== Medalists ==
=== Men ===
Event	Gold	Silver	Bronze
RS:X	Bi Kun; China	Michael Cheng; Hong Kong	Lee Tae-hoon; South Korea
Laser	Ha Jee-min; South Korea	Khairulnizam Afendy; Malaysia	Ryan Lo; Singapore
470	Japan; Tetsuya Isozaki; Akira Takayanagi	China; Wang Chao; Xu Zangjun	Thailand; Navee Thamsoontorn; Nut Butmarasri
49er	Japan; Shingen Furuya; Shinji Hachiyama	South Korea; Chae Bon-jin; Kim Dong-wook	India; Varun Thakkar; K. C. Ganapathy

=== Women ===
Event	Gold	Silver	Bronze
RS:X	Chen Peina; China	Hayley Chan; Hong Kong	Siripon Kaewduang-ngam; Thailand
Laser Radial	Manami Doi; Japan	Zhang Dongshuang; China	Nur Shazrin Mohd Latif; Malaysia
470	Japan; Ai Yoshida; Miho Yoshioka	China; Wei Mengxi; Gao Haiyan	Malaysia; Nuraisyah Jamil; Norashikin Sayed
49erFX	Singapore; Kimberly Lim; Cecilia Low	India; Varsha Gautham; Sweta Shervegar	Thailand; Nichapa Waiwai; Kamonchanok Klahan

=== Mixed ===
Event	Gold	Silver	Bronze
RS:One	China; Chen Hao; Tan Yue	Hong Kong; Rafeek Kikabhoy; Ma Kwan Ching	Malaysia; Ilham Wahab; Nur Fatin Solehah
Laser 4.7	Fauzi Kaman Shah; Malaysia	Wang Jianxiong; China	Harshita Tomar; India

== Medal table ==
Rank	Nation	Gold	Silver	Bronze	Total
1	Japan (JPN)	4	0	0	4
2	China (CHN)	3	4	0	7
3	Malaysia (MAS)	1	1	3	5
4	South Korea (KOR)	1	1	1	3
5	Singapore (SGP)	1	0	1	2
6	Hong Kong (HKG)	0	3	0	3
7	India (IND)	0	1	2	3
8	Thailand (THA)	0	0	3	3
Totals (8 entries)		10	10	10	30

== Participating nations ==
A total of 145 athletes from 20 nations competed in sailing at the 2018 Asian Games:

- Bahrain (1)
- Cambodia (3)
- China (16)
- Chinese Taipei (1)
- Hong Kong (12)
- India (9)
- Indonesia (16)
- Iran (2)
- Japan (12)
- Kazakhstan (4)
- Malaysia (10)
- Oman (3)
- Pakistan (5)
- Philippines (3)
- Qatar (2)
- Singapore (15)
- South Korea (11)
- Sri Lanka (1)
- Thailand (16)
- United Arab Emirates (3)
