= List of Asian Championships medalists in sailing =

This is a List of Asian Championships medalists in sailing.

== Nacra 17 ==
Year	Gold	Silver	Bronze
2017 Shanghai	Italy; Ruggero Tita; Caterina Banti	United States; Riley Gibbs; Louisa Chafee	Denmark; Annette Vibourg; Mattias Brun

== RS:X ==
=== Men ===
Year	Gold	Silver	Bronze
2014 Singapore	Ek Boonsawad (THA)	Chang Hao (TPE)	Leonard Ong (SIN)
2015 Enoshima	Andy Leung (HKG)	Lee Chun Ting (HKG)	Daiya Kuramochi (JPN)
2016 Abu Dhabi	Cho Won-woo (KOR)	Michael Cheng (HKG)	Natthaphong Phonoppharat (THA)
2017 Penghu	Lee Tae-hoon (KOR)	Cho Won-woo (KOR)	Makoto Tomizawa (JPN)

=== Women ===
Year	Gold	Silver	Bronze
2014 Singapore	Wai Yan Ngai (HKG)	Sin Lam Sonia Lo (HKG)	Siripon Kaewduang-ngam (THA)
2015 Enoshima	Megumi Komine (JPN)	Wai Yan Ngai (HKG)	Ma Kwan Ching (HKG)
2016 Abu Dhabi	Sin Lam Sonia Lo (HKG)	Siripon Kaewduang-ngam (THA)	Sabin Chun (KOR)
2017 Penghu	Hei Man Chan (HKG)	Sin Lam Sonia Lo (HKG)	Wai Yan Ngai (HKG)

== See also ==
- ASF
