= Sailing at the 2010 Asian Games – Girls' 420 =

Girls' 420 at the 2010 Asian Games
- Venue: Shanwei Water Sports Center
- Date: 14–20 November 2010
- Competitors: 12 from 6 nations

Medalists
gold medal	Rachel Lee; Cecilia Low	Singapore
silver medal	Khairunnisa Afendy; Norashikin Sayed	Malaysia
bronze medal	Wei Mengxi; Gao Haiyan	China

The girls' 420 competition at the 2010 Asian Games in Shanwei was held from 14 to 20 November 2010. It was an under-19 event and sailors born in or after 1991 were eligible to compete.

== Schedule ==
All times are China Standard Time (UTC+08:00)

Date	Time	Event
Sunday, 14 November 2010	12:00	Race 1
Sunday, 14 November 2010	12:00	Race 2
Monday, 15 November 2010	12:00	Race 3
Monday, 15 November 2010	12:00	Race 4
Tuesday, 16 November 2010	12:00	Race 5
Tuesday, 16 November 2010	12:00	Race 6
Wednesday, 17 November 2010	12:00	Race 7
Wednesday, 17 November 2010	12:00	Race 8
Friday, 19 November 2010	12:00	Race 9
Saturday, 20 November 2010	12:00	Race 10
Saturday, 20 November 2010	12:00	Race 11
Saturday, 20 November 2010	12:00	Race 12

== Results ==
Legend

- DNC — Did not come to the starting area
- DNF — Did not finish
- DNS — Did not start
- OCS — On course side

Rank	Team	Race												Total
Rank	Team	1	2	3	4	5	6	7	8	9	10	11	12	Total
1st place, gold medalist(s)	Singapore (SIN); Rachel Lee; Cecilia Low	1	1	1	1	1	1	2	1	1	~~(3)~~	1	1	12
2nd place, silver medalist(s)	Malaysia (MAS); Khairunnisa Afendy; Norashikin Sayed	3	2	2	~~(4)~~	4	4	1	2	2	2	2	3	27
3rd place, bronze medalist(s)	China (CHN); Wei Mengxi; Gao Haiyan	~~(4)~~	3	3	3	2	2	3	4	3	1	4	4	32
4	Thailand (THA); Patteera Meeusamsen; Narisara Yusawat	2	~~(4)~~	4	2	3	3	4	3	4	4	3	2	34
5	Iran (IRI); Parisa Moradi; Kimia Minabinejad	5	5	5	5	5	5	5	5	5	~~(7)~~; OCS	5	5	55
6	Pakistan (PAK); Fabiha Khan; Hadia Khan	6	~~(7)~~; DNF	7 DNF	7 DNC	7 DNF	6	7 DNC	7 DNS	7 DNS	5	6	6	71
