= Sailing at the 2014 Asian Games – Women's 29er =

Women's 29er at the 2014 Asian Games
- Venue: Wangsan Marina
- Date: 24–30 September 2014
- Competitors: 12 from 6 nations

Medalists
gold medal	Noppakao Poonpat; Nichapa Waiwai	Thailand
silver medal	Priscilla Low; Cecilia Low	Singapore
bronze medal	Varsha Gautham; Aishwarya Nedunchezhiyan	India

The women's 29er competition at the 2014 Asian Games in Incheon was held from 24 to 30 September 2014.

== Schedule ==
All times are Korea Standard Time (UTC+09:00)

Date	Time	Event
Wednesday, 24 September 2014	12:00	Race 1
Wednesday, 24 September 2014	12:00	Race 2
Wednesday, 24 September 2014	12:00	Race 3
Wednesday, 24 September 2014	12:00	Race 4
Thursday, 25 September 2014	11:00	Race 5
Thursday, 25 September 2014	11:00	Race 6
Friday, 26 September 2014	11:00	Race 7
Friday, 26 September 2014	11:00	Race 8
Saturday, 27 September 2014	11:00	Race 9
Saturday, 27 September 2014	11:00	Race 10
Tuesday, 30 September 2014	11:00	Race 11
Tuesday, 30 September 2014	11:00	Race 12

== Results ==
Legend

- DSQ — Disqualification

Rank	Team	Race												Total
Rank	Team	1	2	3	4	5	6	7	8	9	10	11	12	Total
1st place, gold medalist(s)	Thailand (THA); Noppakao Poonpat; Nichapa Waiwai	2	2	2	1	2	2	1	2	~~(7)~~; DSQ	2	2	1	19
2nd place, silver medalist(s)	Singapore (SIN); Priscilla Low; Cecilia Low	~~(3)~~	3	3	2	1	1	2	1	1	1	3	3	21
3rd place, bronze medalist(s)	India (IND); Varsha Gautham; Aishwarya Nedunchezhiyan	1	1	1	3	3	4	~~(7)~~; DSQ	3	2	4	1	2	25
4	Malaysia (MAS); Nurul Elia Anuar; Norashikin Sayed	4	4	4	4	~~(5)~~	3	3	4	4	3	5	4	42
5	South Korea (KOR); Kim Ji-a; Kang Jea-hyeon	5	~~(6)~~	6	5	4	5	4	6	3	5	4	5	52
6	Chinese Taipei (TPE); Liu Yu-chun; Chou Li-yu	~~(6)~~	5	5	6	6	6	5	5	5	6	6	6	61
