= Ancol (Transjakarta) =

Bus rapid transit station in Jakarta, Indonesia

5 01 Ancol
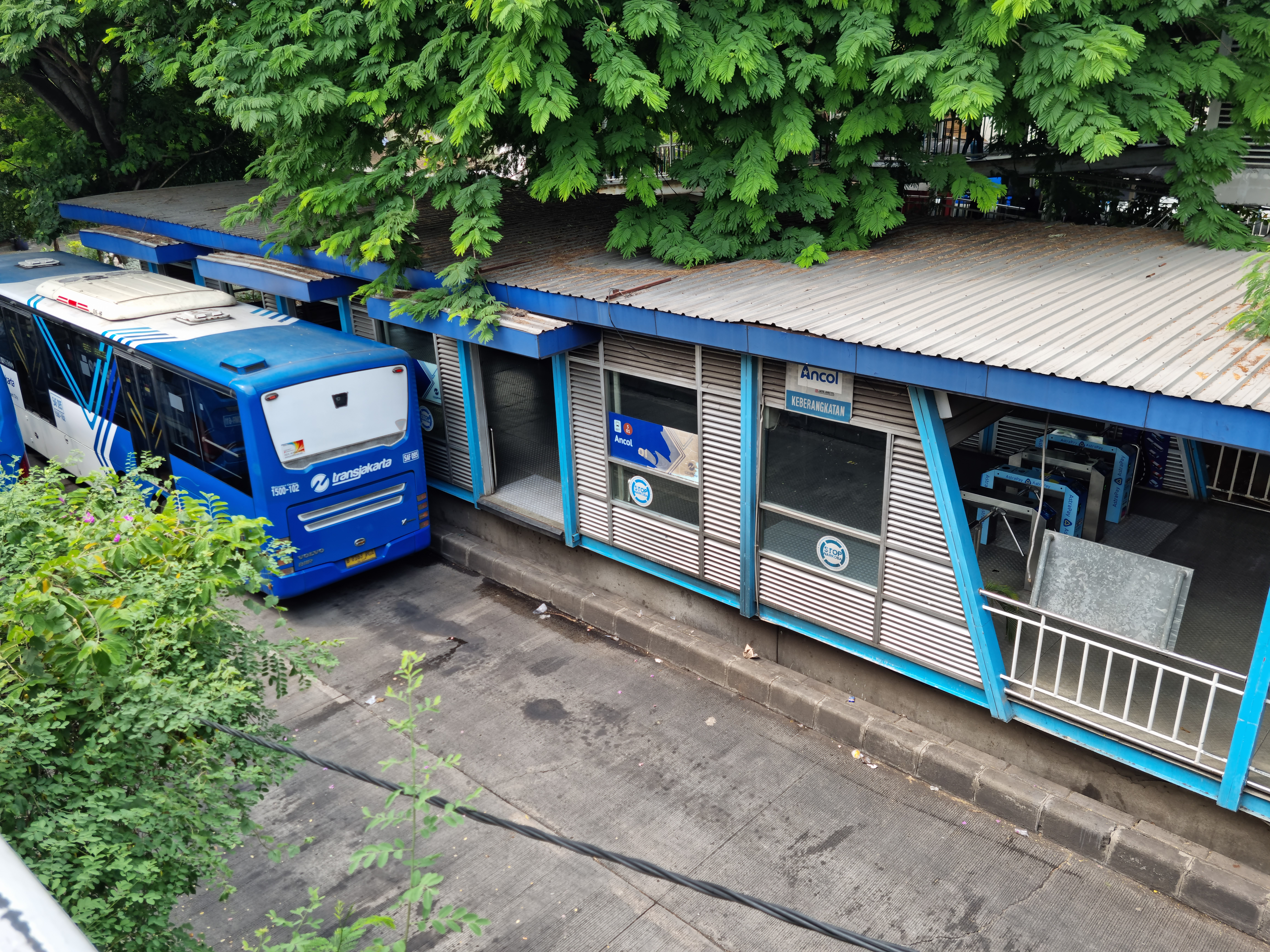

General information
- Location: Ancol Dreamland, Pantai Indah Street, Ancol, Pademangan, North Jakarta 14430, Indonesia
- Coordinates: 6.1276°S 106.8303°E
- System: Transjakarta bus rapid transit station
- Owner: Transjakarta
- Operator: Transjakarta
- Lines: List of Transjakarta corridors#Corridor 5
- Platforms: Two side platforms with separate paid area per platform

Construction
- Structure type: At-grade
- Cycle facilities: No

Other information
- Status: In service

History
- Opened: 27 January 2007

Services
Preceding		Following
Terminus	Corridor 5 Terminus	Pademangan towards Kampung Melayu
Location

Ancol is a Transjakarta bus rapid transit station located in Ancol Dreamland, Pademangan, North Jakarta, Indonesia. It is the northern terminus of Corridor 5, and is named after the theme park it is located in.

Ancol BRT station commenced operations on 27 January 2007, along with the inauguration ceremony of corridors 4-7 that took place here.

== Building and layout ==
The Ancol station was opened to provide public transit access to Ancol Dreamland. Passengers can exit from the arrival platform and proceed to the level 2 concourse to buy the theme park ticket.

The station, like some other terminus stations, has a separate paid area for each departure and arrival platform. Transferring requires tapping out and paying again. Although located inside the theme park, there is also an exit to Lodan Raya Street at south. In the station concourse outside the paid area, there are automatic vending machines, public toilets, and praying rooms (musala).

West	Arrivals
Side platform, doors open on the right		Linkway	Waiting area
Access ramp to Ancol Dreamland ⇠		Linkway	Waiting area
Side platform, doors open on the right		Linkway	Waiting area
East	← (Pademangan) towards Kampung Melayu

== Non-BRT bus services ==
Type	Route	Destination	Notes
Inner city feeder		Blok M—Ancol	Inside the station
Inner city feeder		Arrivals only from Cibubur Junction	Inside the station
Mikrotrans Jak Lingko	JAK 88	Tanjung Priok—Ancol Barat	Outside the station

== Places nearby ==
- Ancol Dreamland
  - Dunia Fantasi
  - SeaWorld Ancol
  - Atlantis Water Adventure
  - Ancol Festival Beach
  - Pasar Seni
  - Allianz Eco Park

== Incident ==
On 12 December 2025, a tree fell into the bus track in the east building for passenger boarding after an all-day-long heavy rain and gales.

== Gallery ==
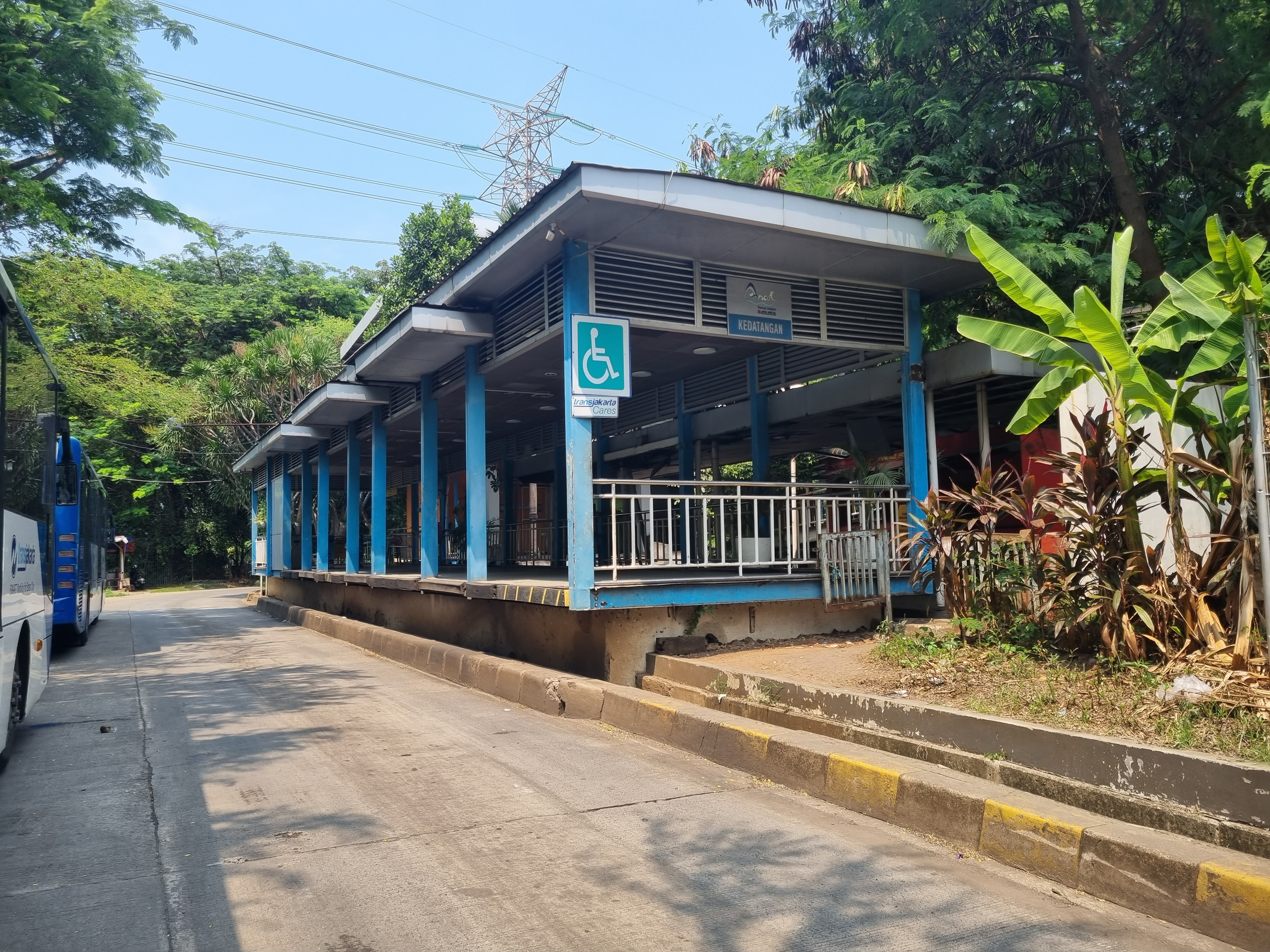
Arrival platform, 2023

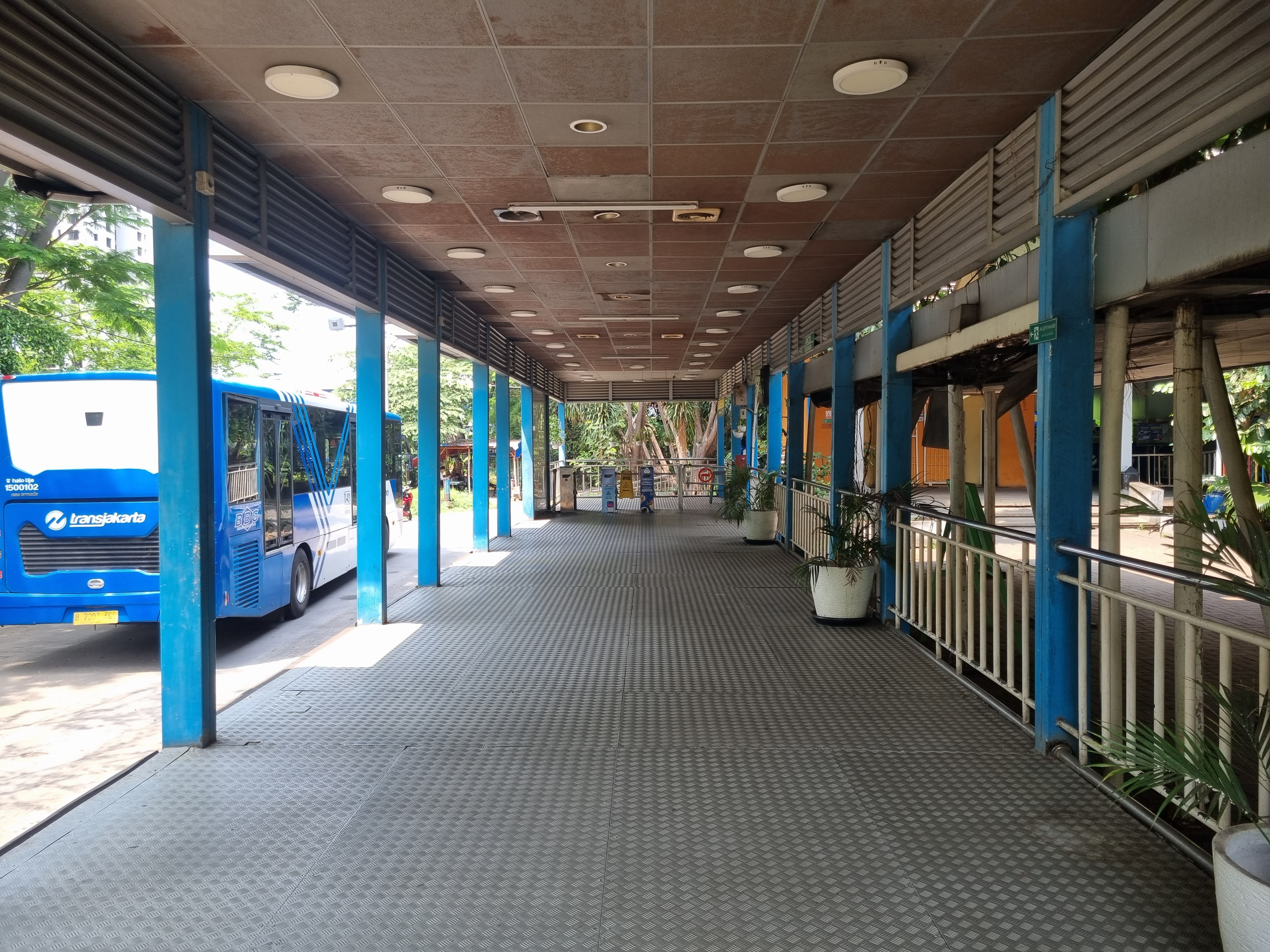
Arrival platform, 2023

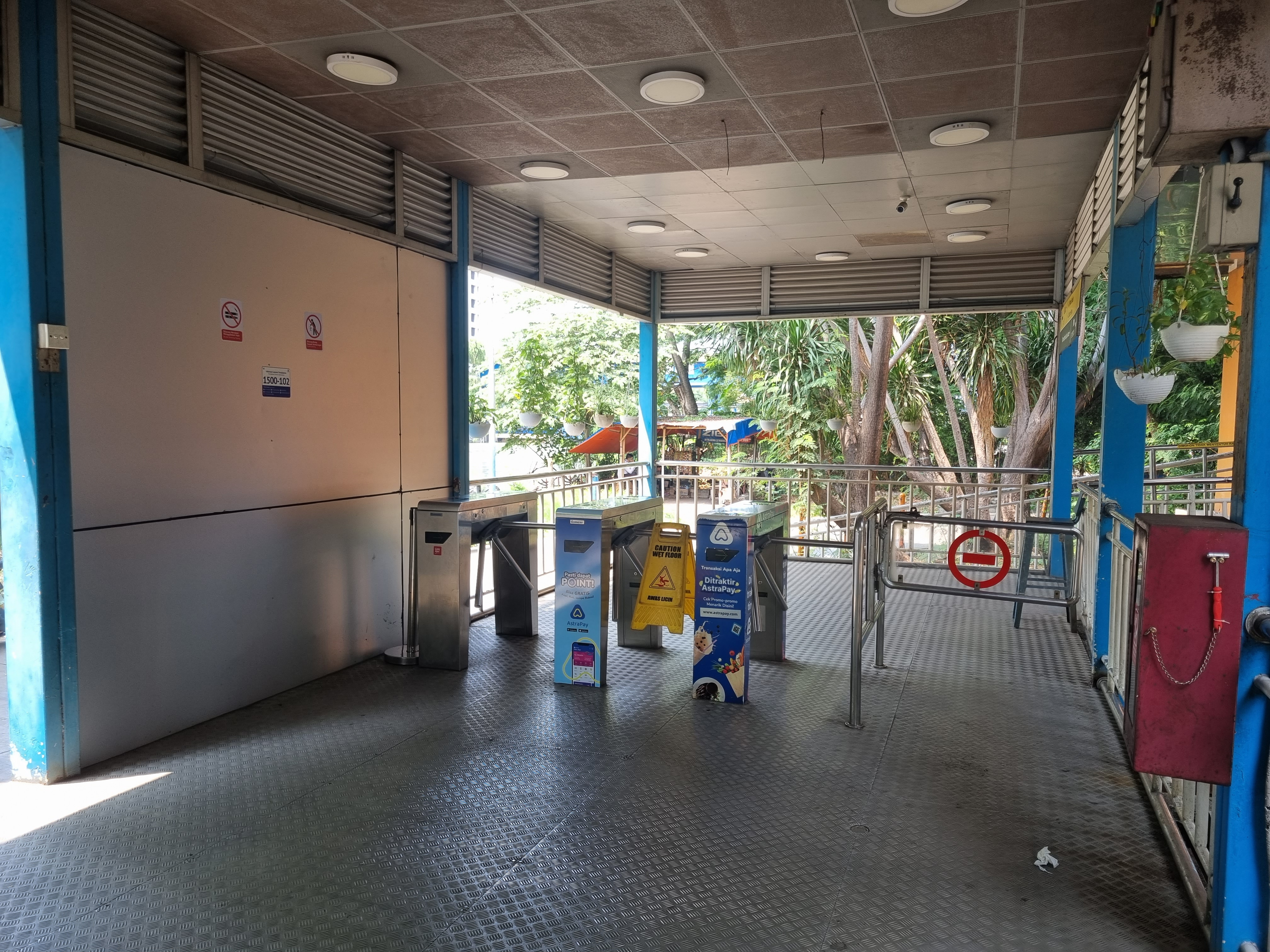
Faregates to exit the arrival platform, 2023

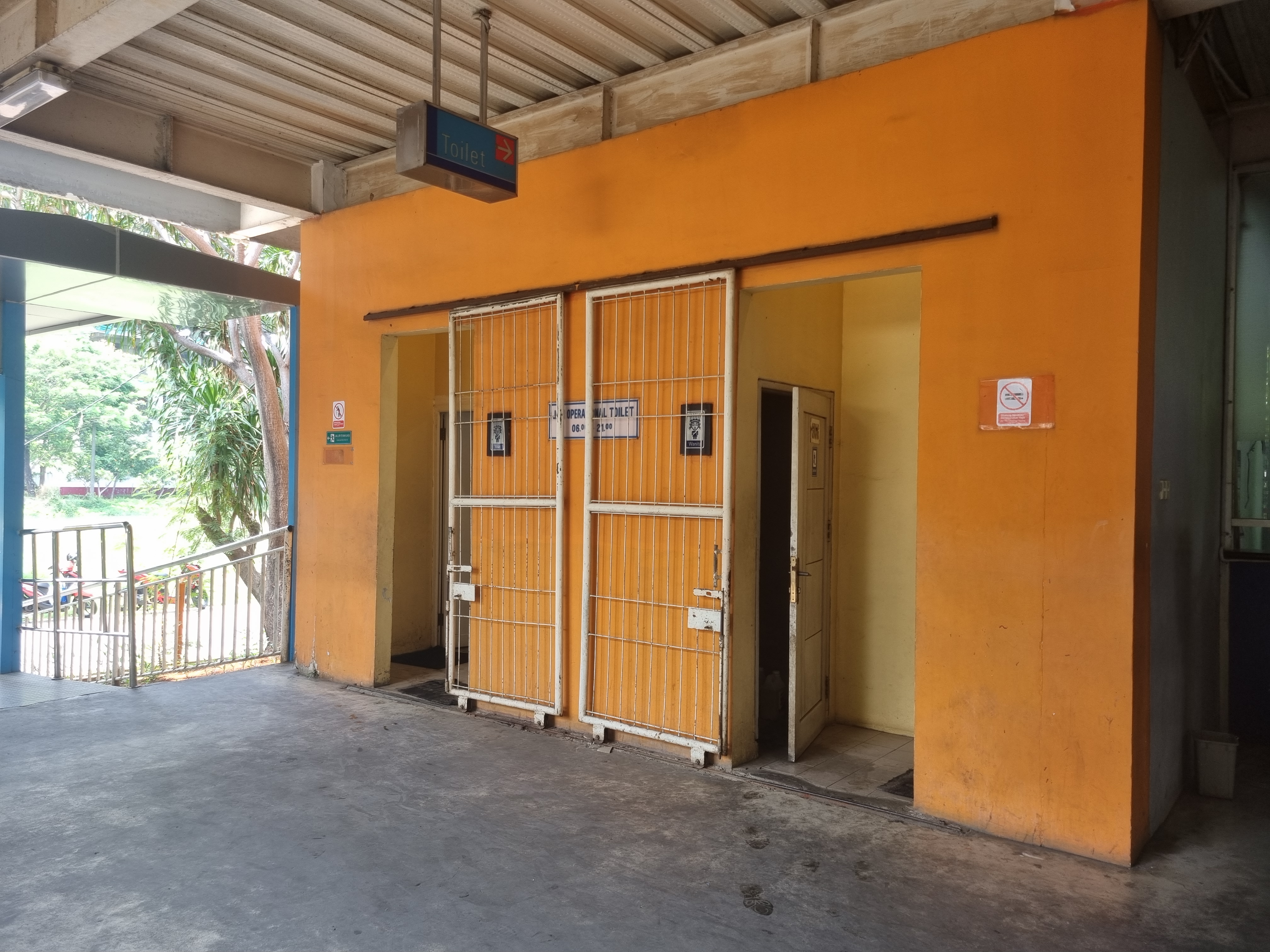
Toilets

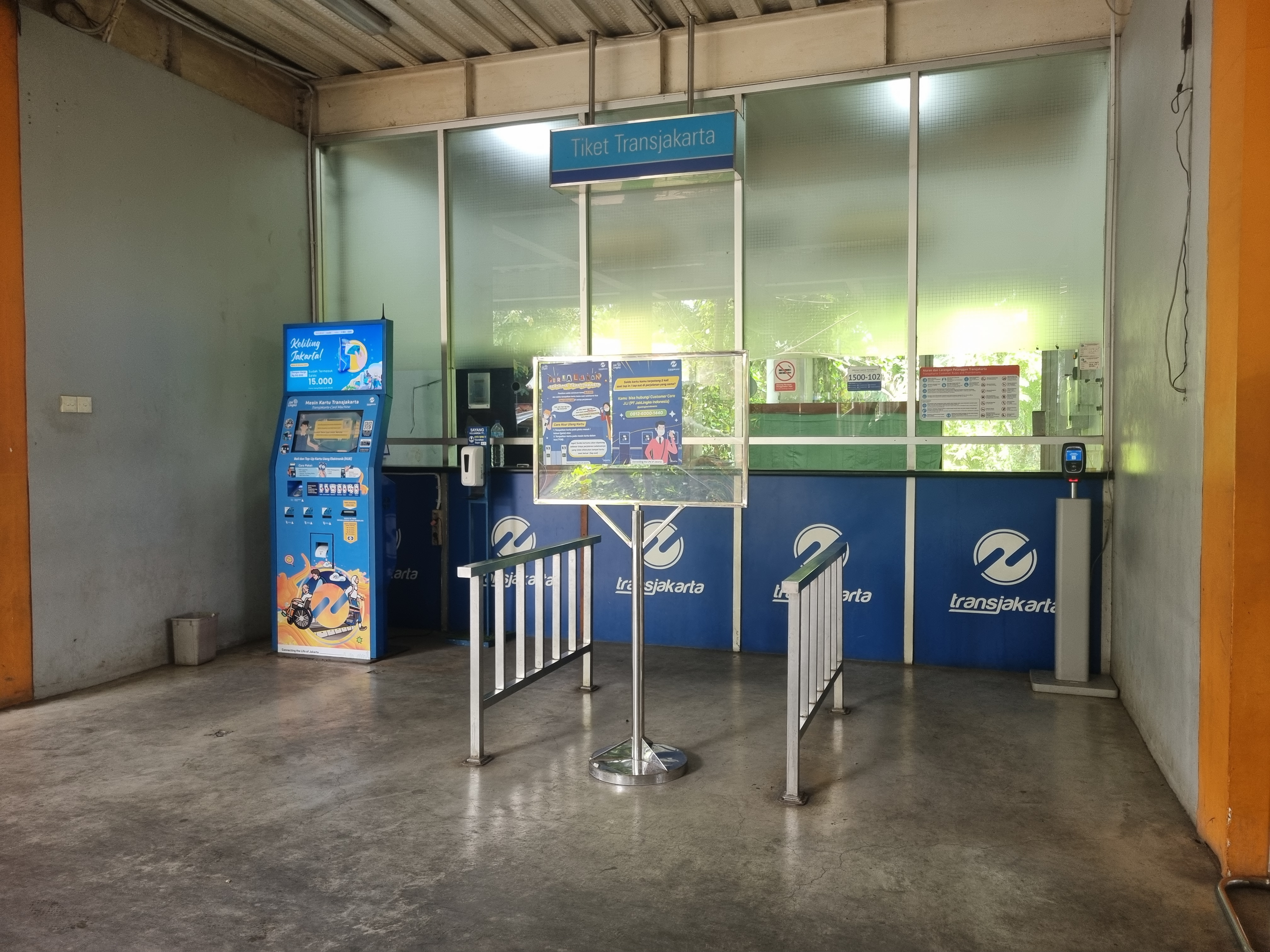
Manual ticket counter, 2023

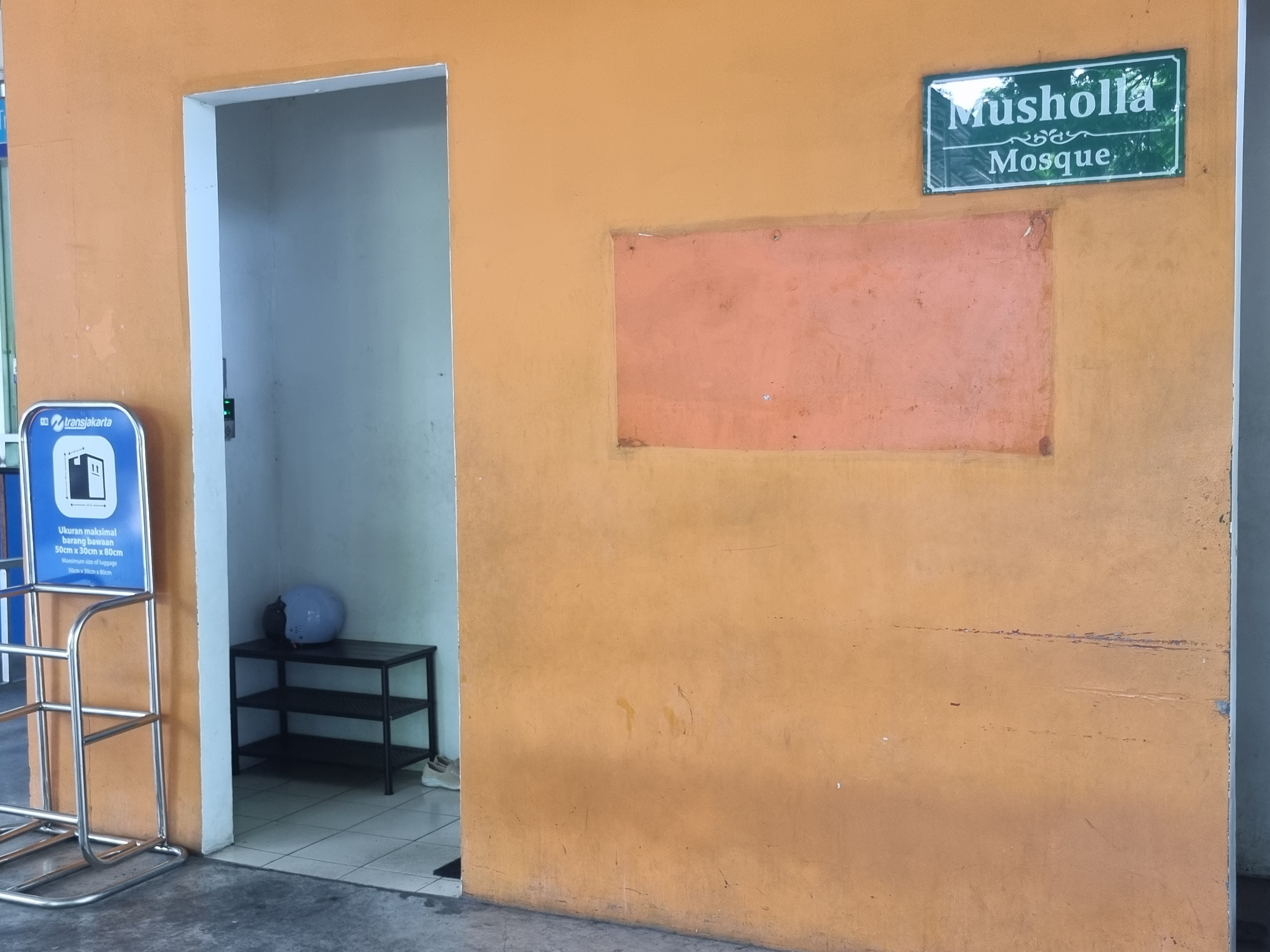
Praying room, 2023

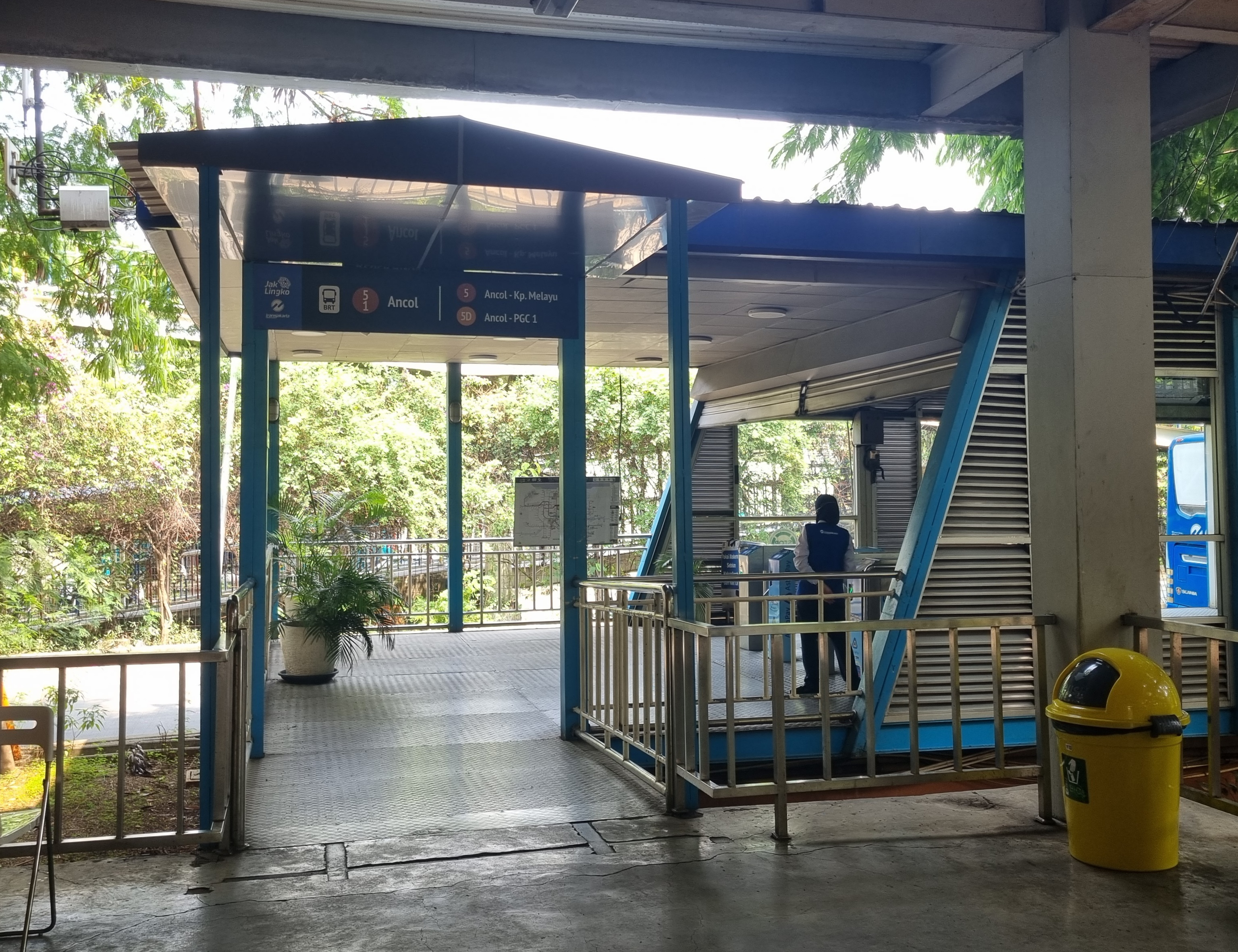
Access to departure platform, 2023

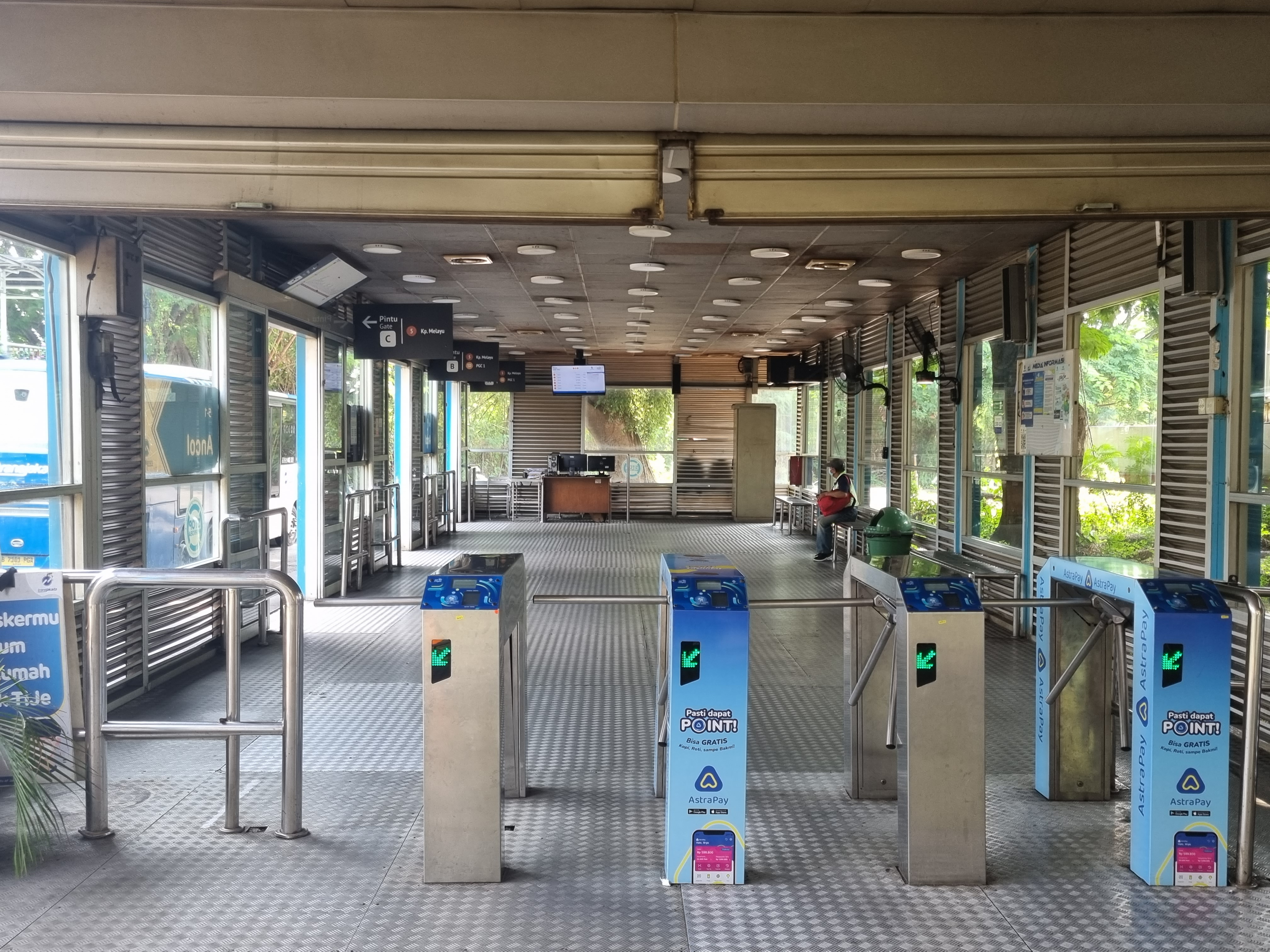
Departure platform, 2023

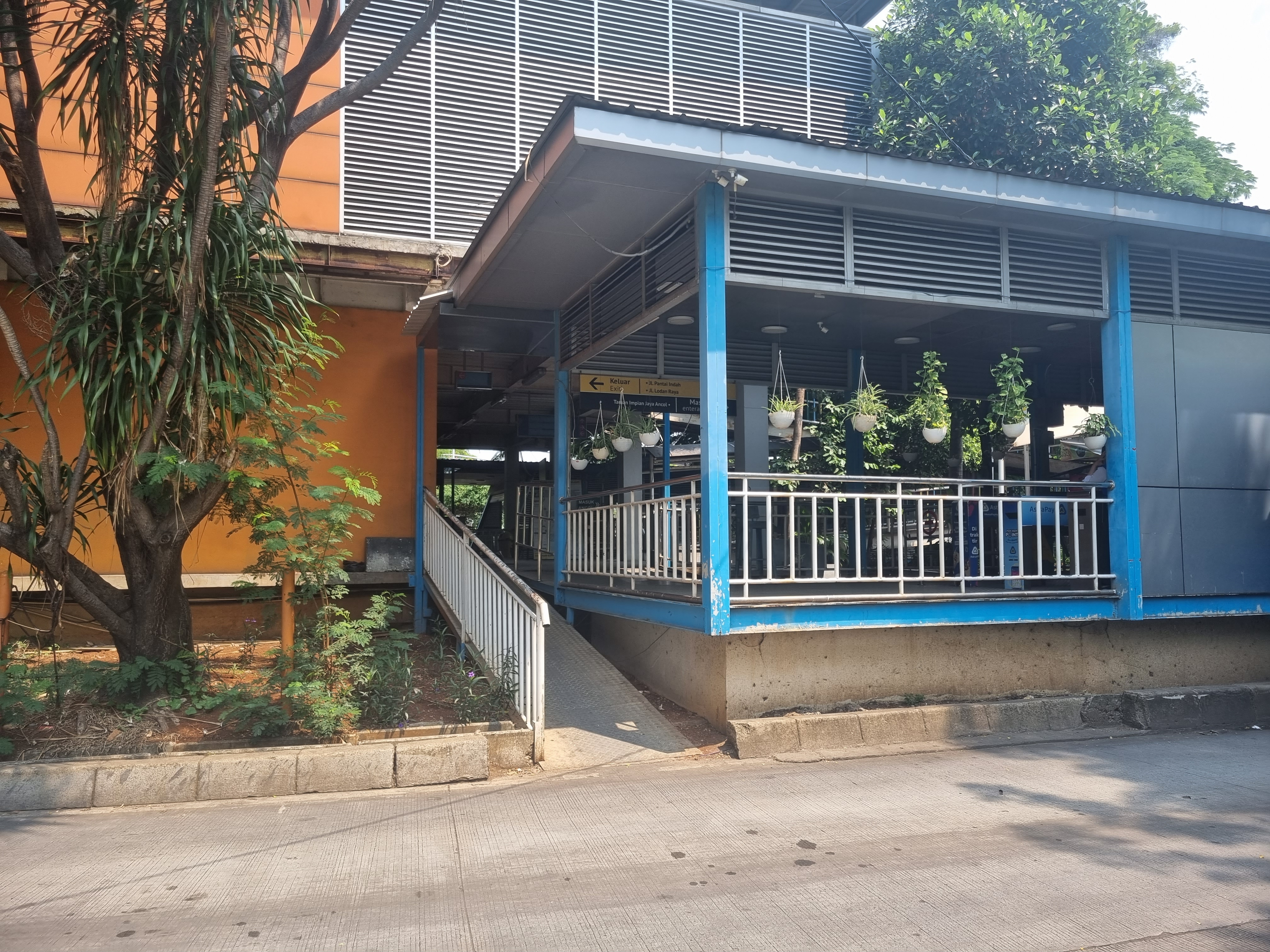
Station access ramp, 2023.

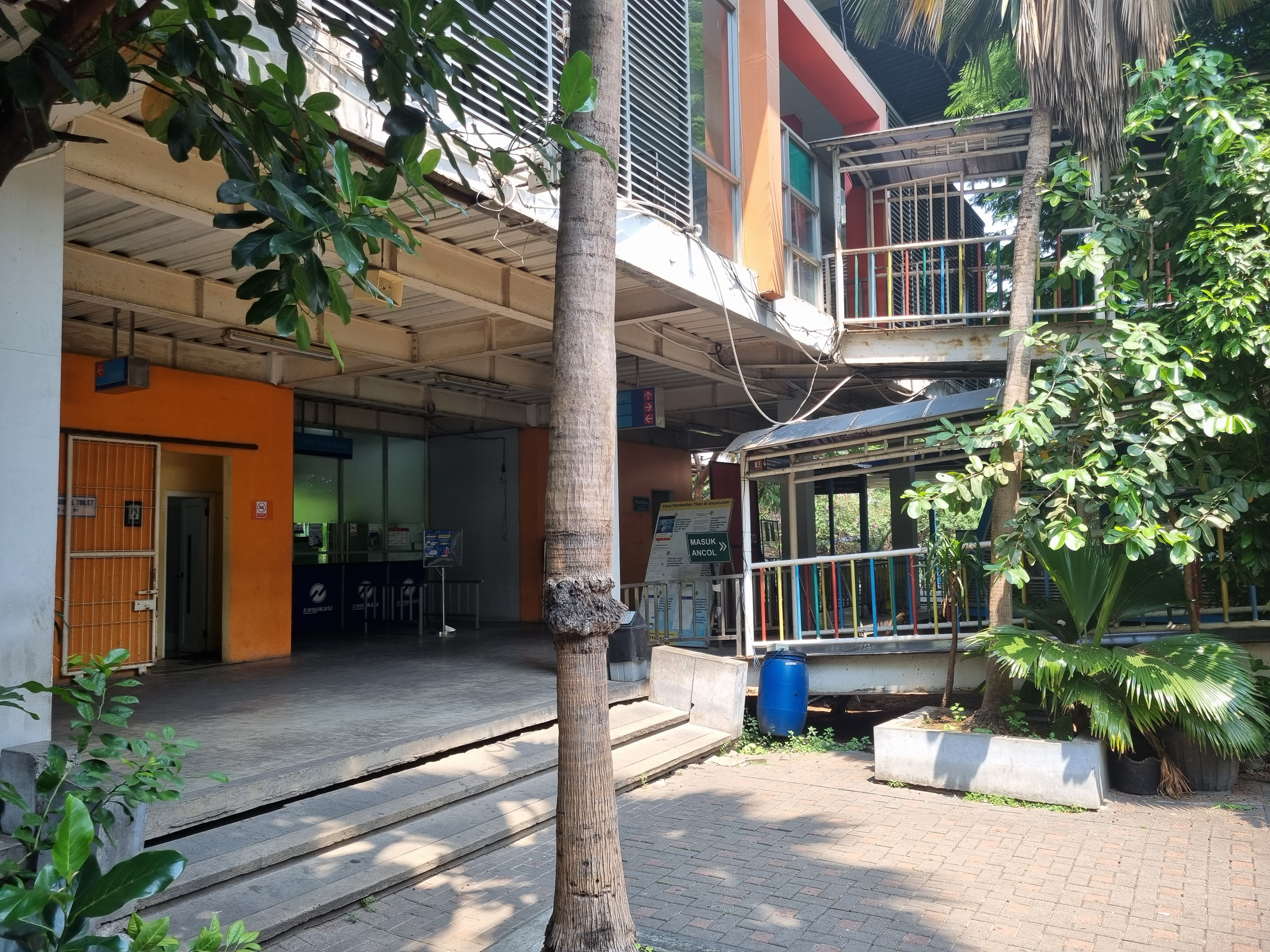
Former commercial area, 2023.

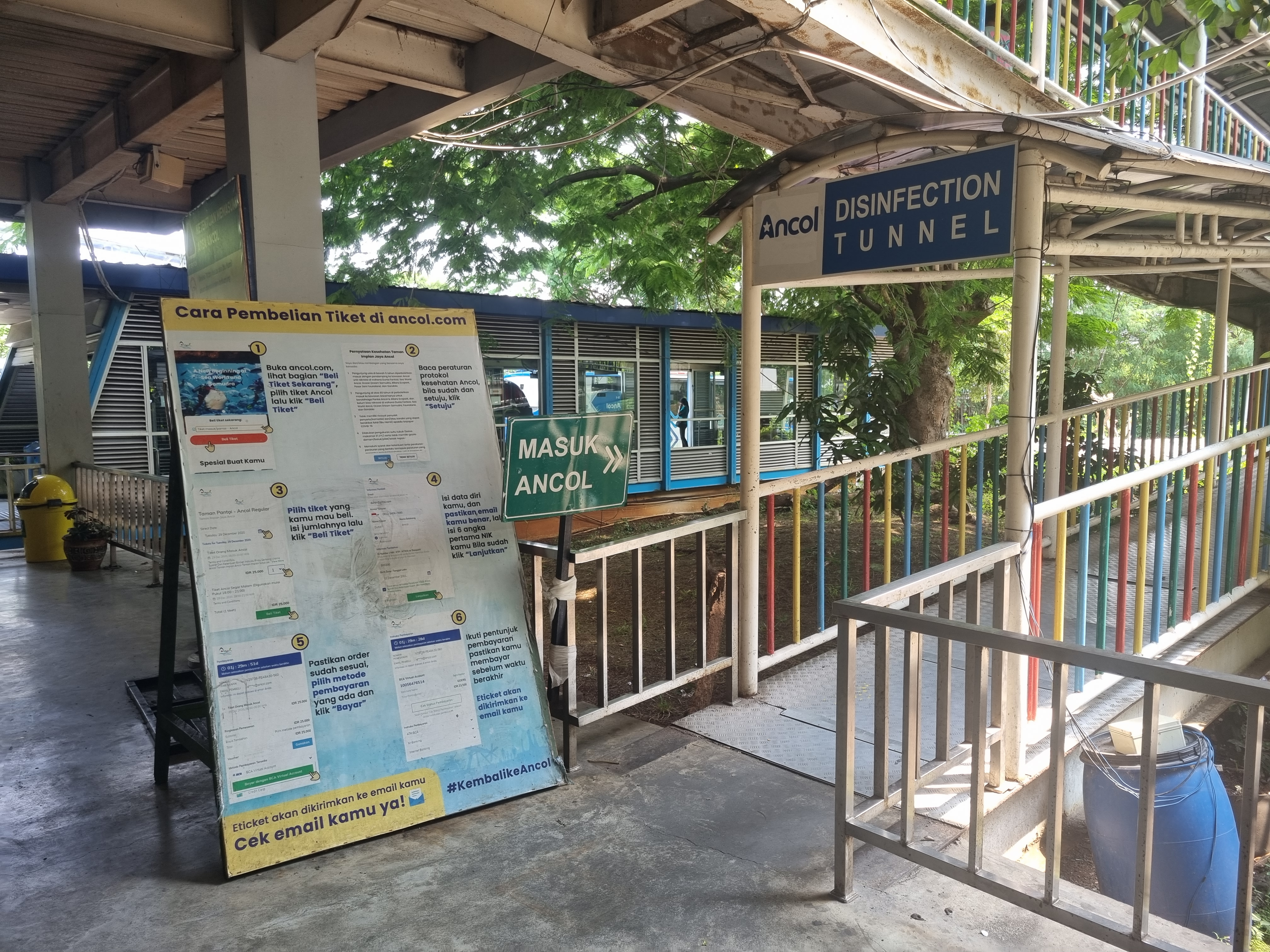
Access ramp to the theme park, 2023.

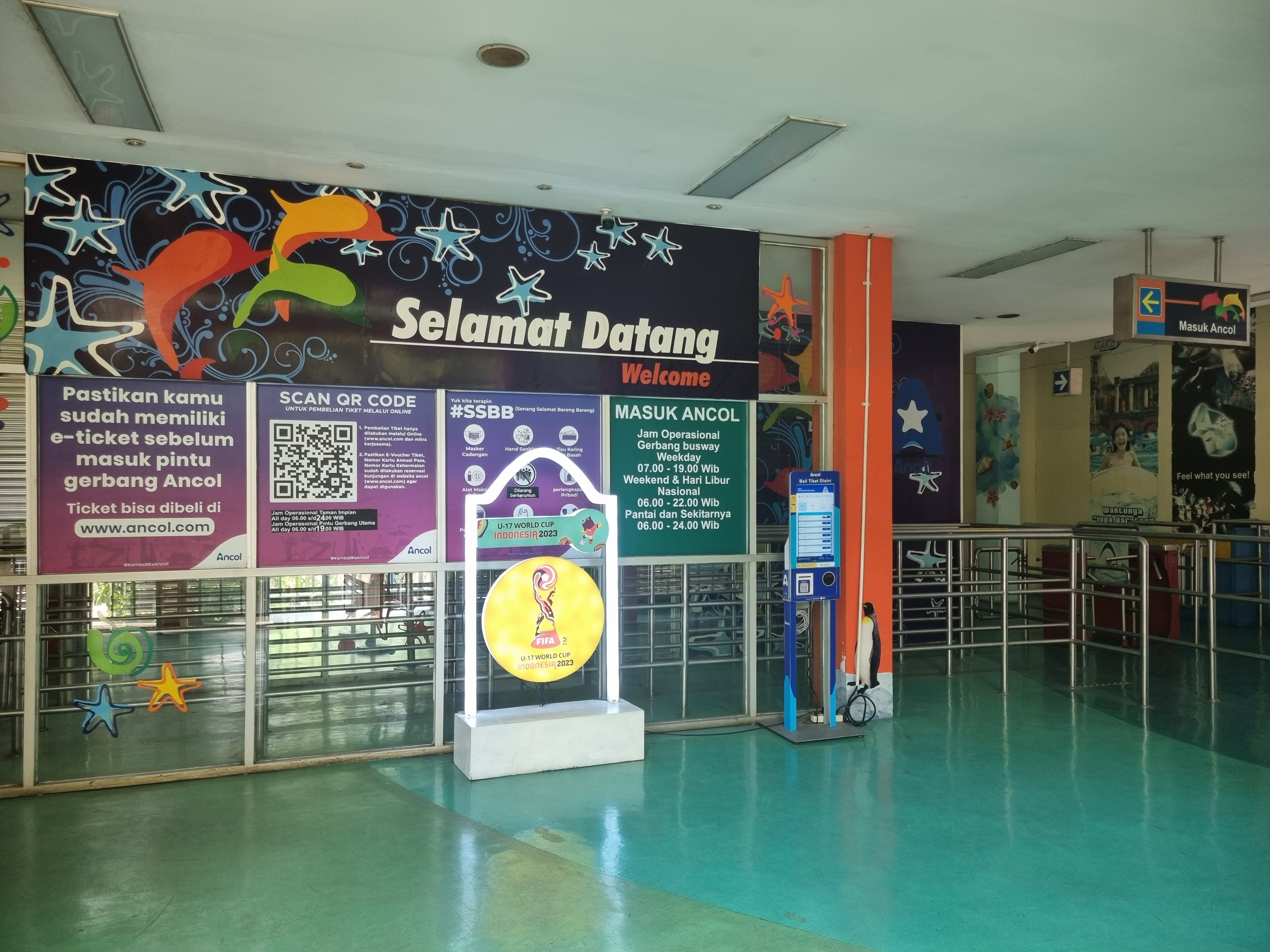
Level 2 concourse, 2023.

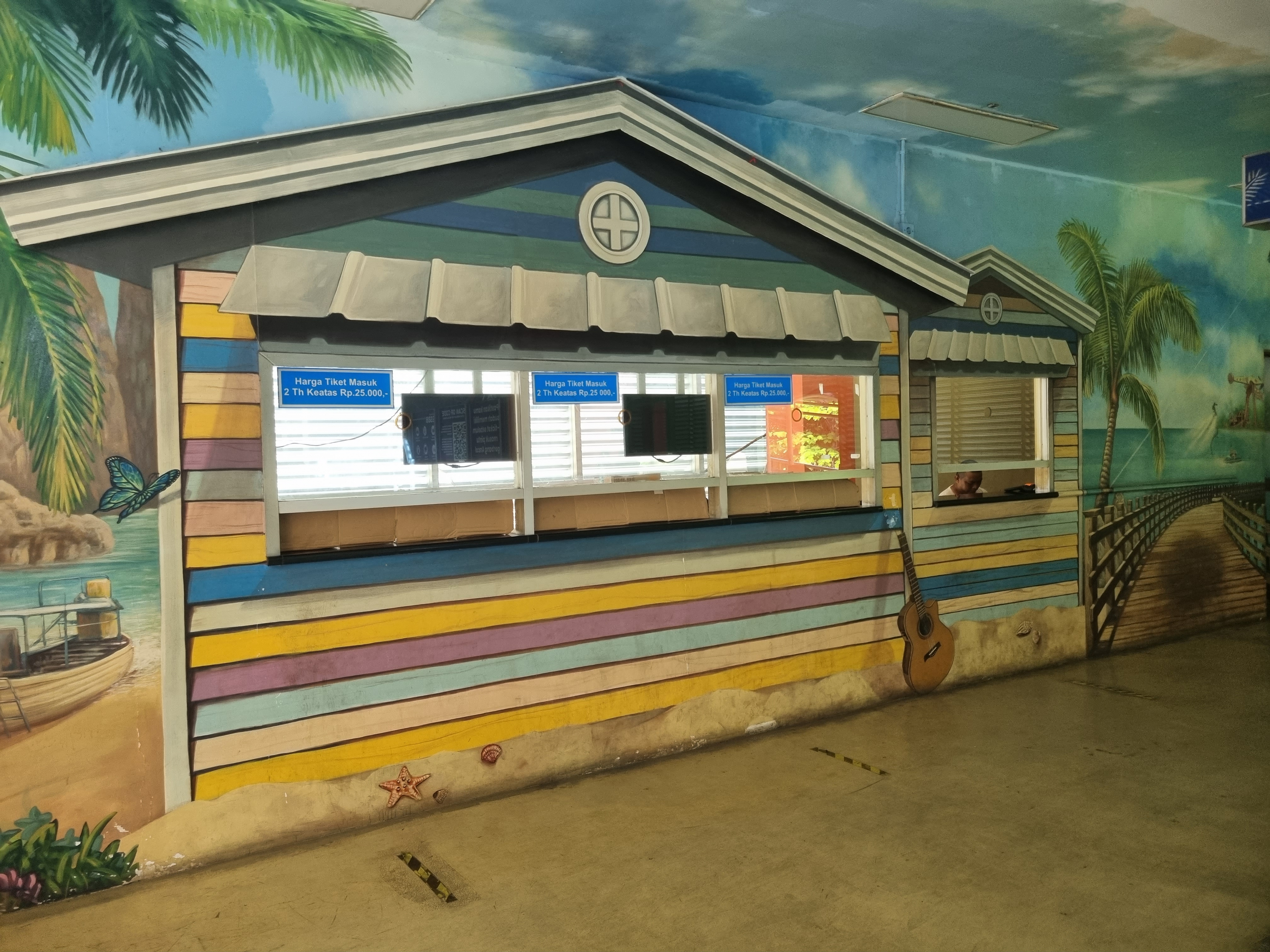
Theme park ticket counter, 2023
