= Sailing at the 2014 Asian Games – Women's RS:X =

Women's RS:X at the 2014 Asian Games
- Venue: Wangsan Marina
- Date: 24–30 September 2014
- Competitors: 4 from 4 nations

Medalists
gold medal	Hayley Chan	Hong Kong
silver medal	Sun Jiali	China
bronze medal	Sarocha Prumprai	Thailand

The women's RS:X competition at the 2014 Asian Games in Incheon was held from 24 to 30 September 2014.

== Schedule ==
All times are Korea Standard Time (UTC+09:00)

Date	Time	Event
Wednesday, 24 September 2014	12:00	Race 1
Wednesday, 24 September 2014	12:00	Race 2
Wednesday, 24 September 2014	12:00	Race 3
Thursday, 25 September 2014	11:00	Race 4
Thursday, 25 September 2014	11:00	Race 5
Thursday, 25 September 2014	11:00	Race 6
Friday, 26 September 2014	11:00	Race 7
Friday, 26 September 2014	11:00	Race 8
Saturday, 27 September 2014	11:00	Race 9
Saturday, 27 September 2014	11:00	Race 10
Tuesday, 30 September 2014	11:00	Race 11
Tuesday, 30 September 2014	11:00	Race 12

== Results ==
Rank	Athlete	Race												Total
Rank	Athlete	1	2	3	4	5	6	7	8	9	10	11	12	Total
1st place, gold medalist(s)	Hayley Chan (HKG)	~~(1)~~	1	1	1	1	1	1	1	1	1	1	1	11
2nd place, silver medalist(s)	Sun Jiali (CHN)	2	2	2	2	~~(3)~~	2	2	2	2	2	2	2	22
3rd place, bronze medalist(s)	Sarocha Prumprai (THA)	3	3	~~(4)~~	3	2	3	3	3	4	3	3	3	33
4	Chun Sa-bin (KOR)	~~(4)~~	4	3	4	4	4	4	4	3	4	4	4	42
