= Aishwarya Nedunchezhiyan =

Indian sailor (born 1996)

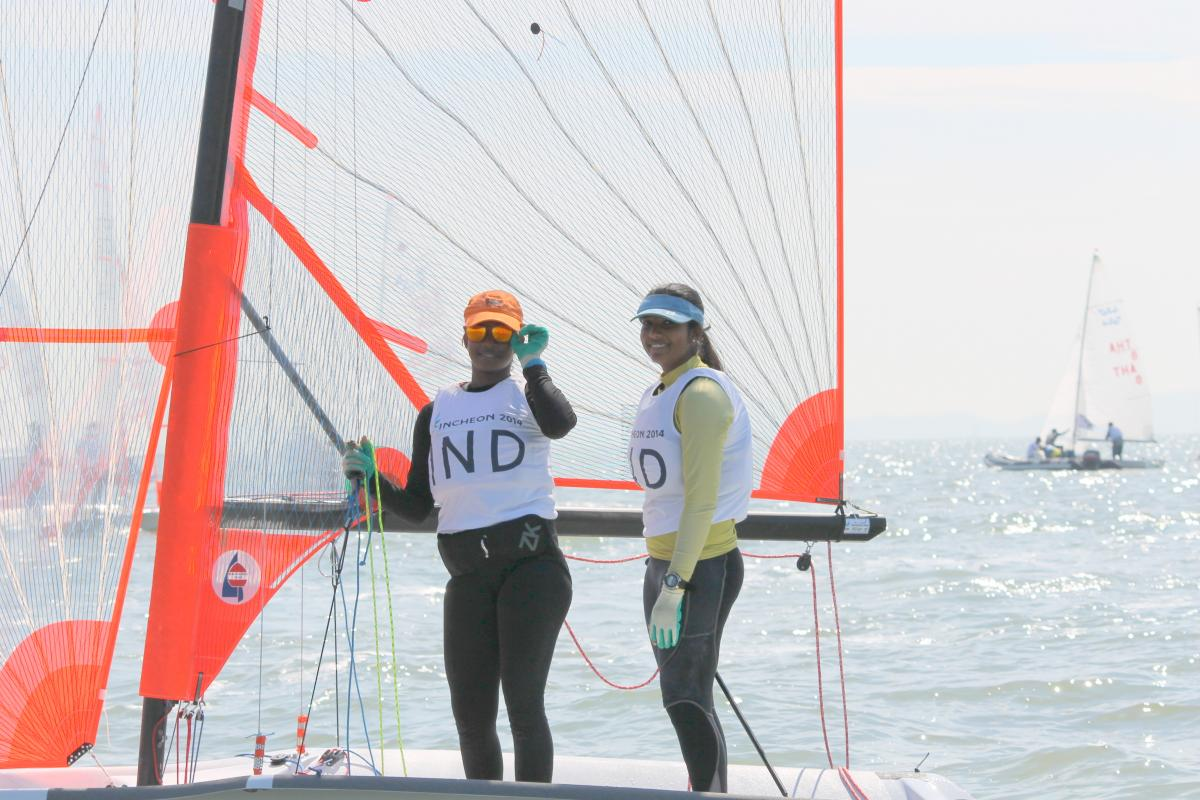
- Varsha Gautham & Aishwarya Neduchezian

Personal information
- Nationality: India
- Born: 1 January 1996 (age 30) Chennai, India
- Height: 163 cm (5 ft 4 in)
- Weight: 56 kg (123 lb)

Sailing career
- Sport: Sailing
- Class(es): 49er FX, 29er
Medal record
Women's sailing
Representing India
Asian Games
Bronze medal – third place	2014 Incheon	29er

Aishwarya Nedunchezhiyan (born 1 January 1996) is an Indian sailor. She won the bronze medal at 2014 Asian Games in Women's 29er event, along with Varsha Gautham.
