= Savannah Siew =

Singaporean sailor

Personal information
- Nationality: Singapore
- Born: Siew Kiah Hui; 18 June 1996 (age 30) Singapore

Sailing career
- Sport: Sailing
Medal record
Women's sailing
Representing Singapore
420 World Championships
Gold medal – first place	2012 Austria U16	420
Gold medal – first place	2012 Austria U18	420
Gold medal – first place	2014 Germany U18	420
Silver medal – second place	2013 Spain	420
Silver medal – second place	2013 Spain U18	420
Silver medal – second place	2014 Germany	420
Asian Games
Gold medal – first place	2014 Incheon	420
Southeast Asian Games
Gold medal – first place	2013 Myanmar	420

Siew Kiah Hui (born 18 June 1996), known as Savannah Siew, is a Singaporean sailor.

As the daughter of former national sailor, Siew Shaw Her, Siew followed in her father's footsteps and started learning sailing at the age of 7.

Siew tasted her first success in 2012 at the 420 World Championships, winning gold medals at both the U16 and U18 categories. However, she missed getting a medal at the Open category, coming in at 4th.

In 2013, Siew won a silver medal in both the Open category and U18 category at the 420 World Championships. She won the silver medal again in the Open category and the gold medal in the U18 category in 2014.

Siew went on to win the gold medal in the 420 class at the 2013 Southeast Asian Games held at Myanmar.

Siew's success continued at the Incheon Asian Games 2014 where she won a gold medal on the 420 class with Kimberly Lim. However, after the 2014 Asian Games, Siew separated from her sailing crew, Lim, and changed to the 470 class while Lim to the 49er FX.

Siew subsequently competed in the 470 class in the 2015 Southeast Asian Games. She came in third during the competition but was not awarded the bronze medal as there were only three teams for the race.
