= Sailing at the 2010 Asian Games – Girls' Optimist =

Girls' Optimist at the 2010 Asian Games
- Venue: Shanwei Water Sports Center
- Date: 14–20 November 2010
- Competitors: 9 from 9 nations

Medalists
gold medal	Noppakao Poonpat	Thailand
silver medal	Kimberly Lim	Singapore
bronze medal	Lu Yuting	China

The girl's Optimist competition at the 2010 Asian Games in Shanwei was held from 14 to 20 November 2010. It was an under-16 event and sailors born in or after 1995 were eligible to compete.

== Schedule ==
All times are China Standard Time (UTC+08:00)

Date	Time	Event
Sunday, 14 November 2010	12:00	Race 1
Sunday, 14 November 2010	12:00	Race 2
Monday, 15 November 2010	12:00	Race 3
Monday, 15 November 2010	12:00	Race 4
Tuesday, 16 November 2010	12:00	Race 5
Wednesday, 17 November 2010	12:00	Race 6
Wednesday, 17 November 2010	12:00	Race 7
Wednesday, 17 November 2010	12:00	Race 8
Friday, 19 November 2010	12:00	Race 9
Friday, 19 November 2010	12:00	Race 10
Saturday, 20 November 2010	12:00	Race 11
Saturday, 20 November 2010	12:00	Race 12

== Results ==
Legend

- DNE — Non-excludable disqualification
- OCS — On course side

Rank	Athlete	Race												Total
Rank	Athlete	1	2	3	4	5	6	7	8	9	10	11	12	Total
1st place, gold medalist(s)	Noppakao Poonpat (THA)	~~(4)~~	1	2	1	1	2	1	4	2	2	3	1	20
2nd place, silver medalist(s)	Kimberly Lim (SIN)	~~(8)~~	3	1	3	2	3	3	2	1	3	1	4	26
3rd place, bronze medalist(s)	Lu Yuting (CHN)	1	2	3	2	~~(6)~~	1	2	1	3	4	2	10; DNE	31
4	Nurul Izzatul Akmar Ruzaimi (MAS)	3	4	4	~~(8)~~	3	4	4	3	5	1	7	3	41
5	Eri Fukasawa (JPN)	5	5	5	6	4	~~(8)~~	7	6	4	5	4	5	56
6	Zephra Currimbhoy (IND)	2	~~(8)~~	6	5	5	7	6	5	6	7	5	6	60
7	Kim Da-hye (KOR)	6	6	7	4	7	6	5	7	~~(8)~~	6	6	2	62
8	Fatemeh Jafari (IRI)	7	7	8	7	9	5	9	8	7	8	~~(10)~~; OCS	8	83
9	Sureni Gunaratne (SRI)	~~(9)~~	9	9	9	8	9	8	9	9	9	8	7	94
