= Sailing at the 2014 Asian Games – Girls' 420 =

Girls' 420 at the 2014 Asian Games
- Venue: Wangsan Marina
- Date: 24–30 September 2014
- Competitors: 12 from 6 nations

Medalists
gold medal	Kimberly Lim; Savannah Siew	Singapore
silver medal	Nuraisyah Jamil; Umi Norwahida Sallahuddin	Malaysia
bronze medal	Lee Na-kyung; Choi Seo-eun	South Korea

The girls' 420 competition at the 2014 Asian Games in Incheon was held from 24 to 30 September 2014. It was an under-19 event and sailors born on or after 1 January 1996 were eligible to compete.

== Schedule ==
All times are Korea Standard Time (UTC+09:00)

Date	Time	Event
Wednesday, 24 September 2014	12:00	Race 1
Wednesday, 24 September 2014	12:00	Race 2
Wednesday, 24 September 2014	12:00	Race 3
Wednesday, 24 September 2014	12:00	Race 4
Thursday, 25 September 2014	11:00	Race 5
Friday, 26 September 2014	11:00	Race 6
Friday, 26 September 2014	11:00	Race 7
Friday, 26 September 2014	11:00	Race 8
Saturday, 27 September 2014	11:00	Race 9
Saturday, 27 September 2014	11:00	Race 10
Tuesday, 30 September 2014	11:00	Race 11
Tuesday, 30 September 2014	11:00	Race 12

== Results ==
Rank	Team	Race												Total
Rank	Team	1	2	3	4	5	6	7	8	9	10	11	12	Total
1st place, gold medalist(s)	Singapore (SIN); Kimberly Lim; Savannah Siew	1	2	2	1	1	1	~~(3)~~	2	1	3	3	1	18
2nd place, silver medalist(s)	Malaysia (MAS); Nuraisyah Jamil; Umi Norwahida Sallahuddin	2	1	3	2	2	2	~~(5)~~	4	2	2	1	2	23
3rd place, bronze medalist(s)	South Korea (KOR); Lee Na-kyung; Choi Seo-eun	~~(5)~~	5	1	5	4	3	1	1	3	1	2	3	29
4	Japan (JPN); Misaki Tanaka; Sena Takano	3	4	4	3	3	4	2	3	4	4	~~(5)~~	5	39
5	China (CHN); Jiang Xinyu; Shen Xinyu	4	3	5	~~(6)~~	6	5	4	5	6	5	6	4	53
6	India (IND); Diya Anna Correa; Zara Khuzaima Arsiwalla	~~(6)~~	6	6	4	5	6	6	6	5	6	4	6	60
