= Sailing at the 2014 Asian Games – Women's RS:One =

Women's RS:One at the 2014 Asian Games
- Venue: Wangsan Marina
- Date: 24–30 September 2014
- Competitors: 7 from 7 nations

Medalists
gold medal	Weng Qiaoshan	China
silver medal	Sonia Lo	Hong Kong
bronze medal	Siripon Kaewduang-ngam	Thailand

The women's RS:One competition at the 2014 Asian Games in Incheon, South Korea was held from 24 to 30 September 2014.

== Schedule ==
All times are Korea Standard Time (UTC+09:00)

Date	Time	Event
Wednesday, 24 September 2014	12:00	Race 1
Wednesday, 24 September 2014	12:00	Race 2
Wednesday, 24 September 2014	12:00	Race 3
Thursday, 25 September 2014	11:00	Race 4
Thursday, 25 September 2014	11:00	Race 5
Thursday, 25 September 2014	11:00	Race 6
Friday, 26 September 2014	11:00	Race 7
Friday, 26 September 2014	11:00	Race 8
Saturday, 27 September 2014	11:00	Race 9
Saturday, 27 September 2014	11:00	Race 10
Tuesday, 30 September 2014	11:00	Race 11
Tuesday, 30 September 2014	11:00	Race 12

== Results ==
Rank	Athlete	Race												Total
Rank	Athlete	1	2	3	4	5	6	7	8	9	10	11	12	Total
1st place, gold medalist(s)	Weng Qiaoshan (CHN)	~~(3)~~	3	1	1	1	3	1	1	2	2	2	3	20
2nd place, silver medalist(s)	Sonia Lo (HKG)	1	1	3	2	~~(4)~~	1	2	2	1	3	3	4	23
3rd place, bronze medalist(s)	Siripon Kaewduang-ngam (THA)	2	2	2	~~(4)~~	2	4	3	3	4	1	1	1	25
4	Audrey Yong (SIN)	~~(4)~~	4	4	3	3	2	4	4	3	4	4	2	37
5	Hoiriyah (INA)	5	5	5	~~(6)~~	6	5	6	6	6	5	6	5	60
6	Lee Yu-jin (KOR)	6	6	6	5	5	6	5	~~(7)~~	5	6	5	6	61
7	Geh Cheow Lin (MAS)	~~(7)~~	7	7	7	7	7	7	5	7	7	7	7	75
