= Sea World Ancol =

Coordinates: 6°07′32″S 106°50′34″E

Sea World Jakarta
- Interactive map of Sea World Jakarta
- Date opened: 1980
- Location: Ancol, North Jakarta, Jakarta, Indonesia
- No. of animals: 3500+
- No. of species: 500+
- Major exhibits: 8+
- Website: www.ancol.com/unit-rekreasi/sea-world-ancol--3

Sea World Ancol, also known as Sea World Jakarta or Sea World Indonesia, is a marine aquarium attraction in North Jakarta, Jakarta, Indonesia. It is part of the Ancol Dreamland complex, and consists of a main tank, a shark tank, and various other tanks, including a turtle exhibit. The main tank is one of the largest aquariums in Southeast Asia. Despite its name, it is completely unaffiliated with the US-based SeaWorld Parks & Entertainment and their chain of theme parks in the United States.

Sea World Ancol was the largest oceanarium in South East Asia at the time it was opened, in 1996, as SeaWorld Jakarta. It was owned by Lippo Group until 2014, when contract problems caused it to be closed in September 2014. It reopened to the public on July 17, 2015. and is now owned by the Jakarta city-owned company PT Pembangunan Jaya Ancol.

It features an aquarium tunnel known as the Antasena tunnel as well as a touch pool and shark aquarium.

The aquarium used to keep a couple of dugong named Doel and Diana since 2000, both died in 2016. In 2018, SeaWorld rescued a baby dugong that was caught by fishermen. After being treated intensively and being able to start eating seagrass, the baby dugong was able to be released back into its natural habitat.

Parni the giant stingray was the former icon of SeaWorld Ancol. Parni was caught by fishermen from Palabuhanratu, Sukabumi, West Java. The aquarium rescued Parni and placed in the main aquarium. Parni lived in SeaWorld for nine years until it died in 2008 due to old age. Parni's body was preserved and placed in the aquarium's museum.

SeaWorld Ancol considered making a reptile exhibit called HerpetoZone and a Humboldt penguin exhibit, but were cancelled due to lack of funding and space. They also considered introducing the ocean sunfish and mahi-mahi to their main aquarium, but it was canned since these two species required large, open exhibits with no rocks nor reefs. A plan for a Raja Ampat Islands thematic exhibit that featured species such as the Indonesian speckled carpetshark was canned as well. The penguin exhibit plan was transferred to Ocean Dream Samudera in 2018, which they managed to build and open in 2019.

Sea World drew controversy among Indonesian environmental activists when they were reported to be planning to bring in a whale shark from the water of Berau Regency, East Kalimantan to the main aquarium. There were worries that the whale shark would be stressed and eventually die when kept in the aquarium. Opposition to the reported plan was expressed via an online petition at Change.org. SeaWorld denied the whale shark plans, saying that the whale shark was not in the cooperation agreement with the Berau Regency government.

In 2013, Sea World Jakarta acquired 10 scalloped hammerhead sharks from the Farglory Ocean Park in Taiwan, becoming the first and only public aquarium to keep the hammerhead shark in Indonesia. After a period of adjustment, six hammerhead sharks were displayed in the aquarium's shark tank in December 2013. As of 2022, no hammerhead sharks were on display.
