= Sailing at the 2018 Asian Games – Women's 49erFX =

Women's Sailing at 2018 Asian Games

Women's 49erFX at the 2018 Asian Games
- Venue: Ancol Beach Marina
- Date: 24–31 August 2018
- Competitors: 10 from 5 nations

Medalists
| gold medal | Kimberly Lim; Cecilia Low | Singapore |
| silver medal | Varsha Gautham; Sweta Shervegar | India |
| bronze medal | Nichapa Waiwai; Kamonchanok Klahan | Thailand |

The women's 49erFX competition at the 2018 Asian Games was held from 24 to 31 August 2018.

== Schedule ==
All times are Western Indonesia Time (UTC+07:00)

| Date | Time | Event |
|---|---|---|
| Friday, 24 August 2018 | 14:10 | Race 1 |
| Friday, 24 August 2018 | 15:10 | Race 2 |
| Saturday, 25 August 2018 | 12:12 | Race 3 |
| Saturday, 25 August 2018 | 13:12 | Race 4 |
| Saturday, 25 August 2018 | 14:05 | Race 5 |
| Sunday, 26 August 2018 | 12:12 | Race 6 |
| Sunday, 26 August 2018 | 13:07 | Race 7 |
| Sunday, 26 August 2018 | 14:07 | Race 8 |
| Tuesday, 28 August 2018 | 12:05 | Race 9 |
| Tuesday, 28 August 2018 | 13:05 | Race 10 |
| Tuesday, 28 August 2018 | 14:05 | Race 11 |
| Wednesday, 29 August 2018 | 12:05 | Race 12 |
| Wednesday, 29 August 2018 | 13:05 | Race 13 |
| Wednesday, 29 August 2018 | 14:24 | Race 14 |
| Friday, 31 August 2018 | 14:05 | Race 15 |

== Results ==
Legend

- DNF — Did not finish
- DSQ — Disqualification

| Rank | Team | Race | | | | | | | | | | | | | | | Total |
| Rank | Team | 1 | 2 | 3 | 4 | 5 | 6 | 7 | 8 | 9 | 10 | 11 | 12 | 13 | 14 | 15 | Total |
|---|---|---|---|---|---|---|---|---|---|---|---|---|---|---|---|---|---|
| 1st place, gold medalist(s) | Singapore (SGP); Kimberly Lim; Cecilia Low | ~~(1)~~ | 1 | 1 | 1 | 1 | 1 | 1 | 1 | 1 | 1 | 1 | 1 | 1 | 1 | 1 | 14 |
| 2nd place, silver medalist(s) | India (IND); Varsha Gautham; Sweta Shervegar | ~~(4)~~ | 2 | 3 | 3 | 3 | 2 | 2 | 2 | 2 | 4 | 3 | 4 | 3 | 3 | 4 | 40 |
| 3rd place, bronze medalist(s) | Thailand (THA); Nichapa Waiwai; Kamonchanok Klahan | 3 | ~~(4)~~ | 4 | 4 | 2 | 3 | 3 | 3 | 3 | 3 | 4 | 3 | 2 | 2 | 3 | 42 |
| 4 | China (CHN); He Xian; Yu Xuebin | 2 | 3 | 2 | 2 | 4 | 4 | ~~(6)~~; DSQ | 4 | 4 | 2 | 2 | 2 | 4 | 6 DSQ | 2 | 43 |
| 5 | Indonesia (INA); Nurul Rahma Iedha; Noviana Puspita Sari | ~~(6)~~; DNF | 6 DNF | 5 | 6 DNF | 6 DNF | 5 | 4 | 6 DNF | 5 | 5 | 5 | 5 | 5 | 4 | 6 DNF | 73 |
