= Kimberly Lim =

Singaporean sailor

Personal information
- Nationality: Singapore
- Born: Lim Min; 26 August 1996 (age 30) Singapore

Sailing career
- Sport: Sailing
- Classes: 49erFX, 420, 470, Optimist
Medal record
Women's sailing
Representing Singapore
420 World Championships
Gold medal – first place	2014 Germany U18	420
Silver medal – second place	2013 Spain	420
Silver medal – second place	2013 Spain U18	420
Silver medal – second place	2014 Germany	420
Optimist World Championships
Gold medal – first place	2011 Napier	Optimist
Optimist Asian Championships
Gold medal – first place	2011	Optimist
Gold medal – first place	2010	Optimist
Asian Games
Gold medal – first place	2018 Jakarta–Palembang	49er FX
Gold medal – first place	2014 Incheon	420
Silver medal – second place	2010 Guangzhou	Optimist
Southeast Asian Games
Gold medal – first place	2013 Myanmar	420

Lim Min (born 26 August 1996), known as Kimberly Lim, is a Singaporean sailor. She was a multiple medalist in various sailing classes in various editions of the Asian Games and also the champion of the Optimist World Championships in 2011. She participated in the 2020 Summer Olympics.

== Early life ==
Lim studied in CHIJ Katong Convent Primary School then at Tanjong Katong Girls' School.

She started sailing at 10 and started racing a year later.

== Sailing career ==
=== Optimist ===
Lim won her first sailing event at the Optimist Australian Championships 2009 in the Optimist class, placing first at the girls' event and second at the overall event.

In the 2010 Optimist Asian Championships, Lim won the championship, tying in points with second placed Carlos Robles Lorente but winning more races than him. She also won the silver medal in the team racing event with the Singapore team.

Her success at the Optimist Asian Championships continued in 2011 when she won the championship again.

At the 2010 Asian Games, Lim won the silver medal in the Optimist class.

In the 2011 Optimist World Championships, Lim won the gold medal in the girl event. She was also part of the racing team for the Nation's Cup (Miami Herald Trophy) and won the gold medal also.

=== 420 ===
At the 2013 Southeast Asian Games held at Myanmar, Lim won the gold medal in the 420 class.

In 2013, Lim with her sailing crew, Savannah Siew won a silver medal in both the Open and U18 categories at the 420 World Championships. Together with Siew, she won the silver medal in the Open category and the gold medal in the U18 category in the 2014 420 World Championships.

Lim's success continued at the 2014 Incheon Asian Games where she won the gold medal in the 420 class with Siew. However, after the Asian Games, both Lim and Siew changed sailing class, with Lim changing to the 49er FX and Siew to the 470 class.

=== 49erFX ===
In 2016, Lim and her teammate, Cecilia Low, participated in the Sailing World Cup in the 49erFX class but without much success, coming in at 8th at Hyeres and 12th at Miami.

With a new coach, Fernando Kuo, Lim and Low came in third at the Trofeo Princesa Sofía sailing regatta held at Palma de Mallorca, Spain in 2017.

In the 2017 Sailing World Cup series, Lim and Low finished in ninth place at Hyères, France. With the results from Trofeo Princesa Sofía, both were able to compete at the Sailing World Cup Final held in Santander. They eventually finished in seventh place.

In 2018, Lim and Low won the gold medal at the 2018 Asian Games in the 49erFX class with one race to spare.

In 2021, Lim and Low participated at the 2020 Summer Olympics in the 49erFX class. The pair became the first Singaporean sailors to participate in a medal race in the Olympics and finished 10th, the best result in sailing for Singapore.

== Awards ==
- 2011/2012 Singapore Sports Award - Meritorious Award Sportsboy/Sportsgirl
- 2011 Singapore Sports Award - Meritorious Award (Sportboy/Sportgirl Team)
- 2014 Singapore Sports Award - (Team of the Year) - Won with Siew for sailing in the 420 class.
- 2015 Singapore Sports Award - Meritorious Award (Team of the Year)
