= Sailing at the 2018 Asian Games – Women's RS:X =

Women's RS:X at the 2018 Asian Games
- Venue: Ancol Beach Marina
- Date: 24–31 August 2018
- Competitors: 6 from 6 nations

Medalists
gold medal	Chen Peina	China
silver medal	Hayley Chan	Hong Kong
bronze medal	Siripon Kaewduang-ngam	Thailand

The women's RS:X competition at the 2018 Asian Games was held from 24 to 31 August 2018.

== Schedule ==
All times are Western Indonesia Time (UTC+07:00)

Date	Time	Event
Friday, 24 August 2018	14:10	Race 1
Friday, 24 August 2018	14:55	Race 2
Saturday, 25 August 2018	12:10	Race 3
Saturday, 25 August 2018	13:15	Race 4
Saturday, 25 August 2018	14:25	Race 5
Sunday, 26 August 2018	12:12	Race 6
Sunday, 26 August 2018	13:22	Race 7
Sunday, 26 August 2018	14:12	Race 8
Tuesday, 28 August 2018	12:05	Race 9
Tuesday, 28 August 2018	12:50	Race 10
Tuesday, 28 August 2018	13:35	Race 11
Wednesday, 29 August 2018	12:05	Race 12
Wednesday, 29 August 2018	12:50	Race 13
Wednesday, 29 August 2018	13:35	Race 14
Friday, 31 August 2018	14:05	Race 15

== Results ==
Rank	Athlete	Race															Total
Rank	Athlete	1	2	3	4	5	6	7	8	9	10	11	12	13	14	15	Total
1st place, gold medalist(s)	Chen Peina (CHN)	~~(2)~~	1	2	1	1	2	1	2	1	2	1	1	1	1	2	19
2nd place, silver medalist(s)	Hayley Chan (HKG)	1	2	1	2	2	1	2	1	~~(3)~~	3	2	2	2	2	1	24
3rd place, bronze medalist(s)	Siripon Kaewduang-ngam (THA)	3	3	4	~~(5)~~	3	3	3	3	2	1	3	3	3	3	4	41
4	Amanda Ng (SGP)	4	4	3	3	4	5	4	4	~~(6)~~	6	4	5	4	6	3	59
5	Megumi Komine (JPN)	~~(6)~~	6	5	4	5	4	5	5	4	5	5	4	6	5	5	68
6	Hoiriyah (INA)	5	5	~~(6)~~	6	6	6	6	6	5	4	6	6	5	4	6	76
