= Sailing at the 2018 Asian Games – Women's 470 =

Women's 470 at the 2018 Asian Games
- Venue: Ancol Beach Marina
- Date: 24–31 August 2018
- Competitors: 14 from 7 nations

Medalists
gold medal	Ai Yoshida; Miho Yoshioka	Japan
silver medal	Wei Mengxi; Gao Haiyan	China
bronze medal	Nuraisyah Jamil; Norashikin Sayed	Malaysia

The women's 470 competition at the 2018 Asian Games was held from 24 to 31 August 2018.

== Schedule ==
All times are Western Indonesia Time (UTC+07:00)

Date	Time	Event
Friday, 24 August 2018	14:10	Race 1
Friday, 24 August 2018	15:10	Race 2
Saturday, 25 August 2018	12:10	Race 3
Saturday, 25 August 2018	13:27	Race 4
Saturday, 25 August 2018	14:45	Race 5
Sunday, 26 August 2018	12:10	Race 6
Sunday, 26 August 2018	13:20	Race 7
Tuesday, 28 August 2018	12:05	Race 8
Tuesday, 28 August 2018	13:05	Race 9
Wednesday, 29 August 2018	12:05	Race 10
Wednesday, 29 August 2018	14:10	Race 11
Friday, 31 August 2018	14:05	Race 12

== Results ==
Legend

- DSQ — Disqualification
- OCS — On course side

Rank	Team	Race												Total
Rank	Team	1	2	3	4	5	6	7	8	9	10	11	12	Total
1st place, gold medalist(s)	Japan (JPN); Ai Yoshida; Miho Yoshioka	1	1	1	1	1	1	1	1	1	2	~~(8)~~; OCS	1	12
2nd place, silver medalist(s)	China (CHN); Wei Mengxi; Gao Haiyan	2	2	2	2	2	~~(8)~~; DSQ	2	2	2	1	1	3	21
3rd place, bronze medalist(s)	Malaysia (MAS); Nuraisyah Jamil; Norashikin Sayed	5	3	~~(6)~~	4	4	2	3	3	3	3	3	4	37
4	Singapore (SGP); Elisa Yukie Yokoyama; Cheryl Teo	3	4	4	~~(5)~~	3	4	4	4	4	4	2	2	38
5	Thailand (THA); Narisara Satta; Sutida Poonpat	4	5	3	3	6	~~(8)~~; DSQ	6	5	5	5	4	5	51
6	Hong Kong (HKG); Tong Kit Fong; Anna Fisher	6	6	5	6	5	3	5	6	~~(7)~~	7	5	6	60
7	Indonesia (INA); Nurul Octaviani Basri; Zefanya Eldiva Finandika	7	7	7	7	7	5	7	7	6	6	~~(8)~~; OCS	7	73
