= Varsha Gautham =

Indian sailor (born 1998)

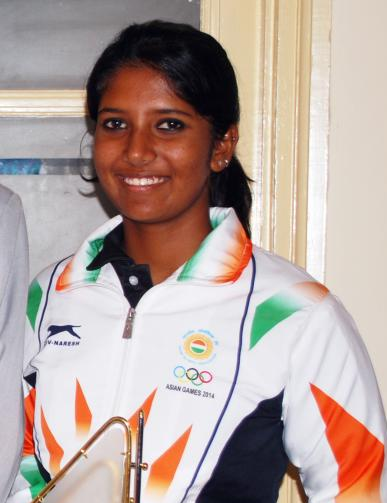
- Varsha Gautham in 2014

Personal information
- Nationality: India
- Born: 12 January 1998 (age 28)
- Height: 171 cm (5 ft 7 1/2 in)
- Weight: 55 kg (121 lb)

Sailing career
- Sport: Sailing
- Class(es): 49er FX, 29er
Medal record
Women's sailing
Representing India
Asian Games
Bronze medal – third place	2014 Incheon	29er
Silver medal – second place	2018 Jakarta	49er FX

Varsha Gautham (born 12 January 1998) is an Indian sailor. She won the bronze medal at the 2014 Asian Games in the women's 29er event, along with Aishwarya Nedunchezhiyan. In doing so, she became the youngest Indian to win an Asian Games medal, at the age of 16. Four years later, Gautham won the silver medal at the 2018 Jakarta Asian Games in the 49er event, along with Sweta Shervegar.
