= Siripon Kaewduang-ngam =

Thai windsurfer (born 1994)

Siripon Kaewduang-Ngam
Personal information
- Nickname: Nong Dao (Young Star)
- Born: 27 July 1994 (age 31) Pattaya, Thailand
- Height: 167 cm (5 ft 6 in)
- Weight: 50 kg (110 lb)

Sailing career
- Sport: Sailing
- Class(es): RS:X, RS:One
Medal record
Women's sailing
Representing Thailand
Asian Games
Gold medal – first place	2022 Hangzhou	RS:X
Bronze medal – third place	2014 Incheon	RS:One
Bronze medal – third place	2018 Jakarta-Palembang	RS:X
Southeast Asian Games
Gold medal – first place	2011 Jakarta-Palembang	RS:X
Youth Olympics
Gold medal – first place	2010 Singapore	Techno 293

Siripon Kaewduang-Ngam (Thai: ศิริพร แก้วดวงงาม, born 27 July 1994) is a Thai competitive windsurfer. She competed at the 2016 Summer Olympics in Rio de Janeiro, in the women's RS:X.
