= Sweta Shervegar =

Indian sailor (born 1990)

Personal information
- Nationality: India
- Born: 12 November 1990 (age 35) Mumbai, India
- Height: 175 cm (5 ft 9 in)
- Weight: 68 kg (150 lb)

Sailing career
- Country: India
- Sport: Sailing
- Class: 49er FX
Medal record
Women's sailing
Representing India
Asian Games
Silver medal – second place	2018 Jakarta	Women's 49er

Sweta Shervegar (born 12 November 1990) is an Indian sailor. She won the silver medal at the 2018 Asian Games in women's 49er event, along with Varsha Gautham. She is a homeopathic doctor and she did her internship in Yerala Medical College in Navi Mumbai.
