= Gao Haiyan (sailor) =

Chinese sailor

Personal information
- Nationality: Chinese
- Born: 26 March 1991 (age 35) Jiaxing, Zhejiang, China

Sailing career
- Sport: Sailing
Medal record
Women's sailing
Representing China
Asian Games
Silver medal – second place	2018 Jakarta-Palembang	470

Gao Haiyan (Chinese: 高海燕, born 26 March 1991) is a Chinese sailor who competed at the 2020 Summer Olympics.
