= Wei Mengxi =

Chinese sailor

Personal information
- Born: 16 February 1994 (age 32) Taizhou, Zhejiang, China

Sport
- Country: China
- Sport: Sailing
Medal record
Women's sailing
Representing China
Asian Games
Silver medal – second place	2018 Jakarta-Palembang	470

Wei Mengxi (February 6, 1994) is a Chinese sailor. She competed in the 2020 Summer Olympics.
