= Hayley Chan =

Hong Kong windsurfer (born 1991)

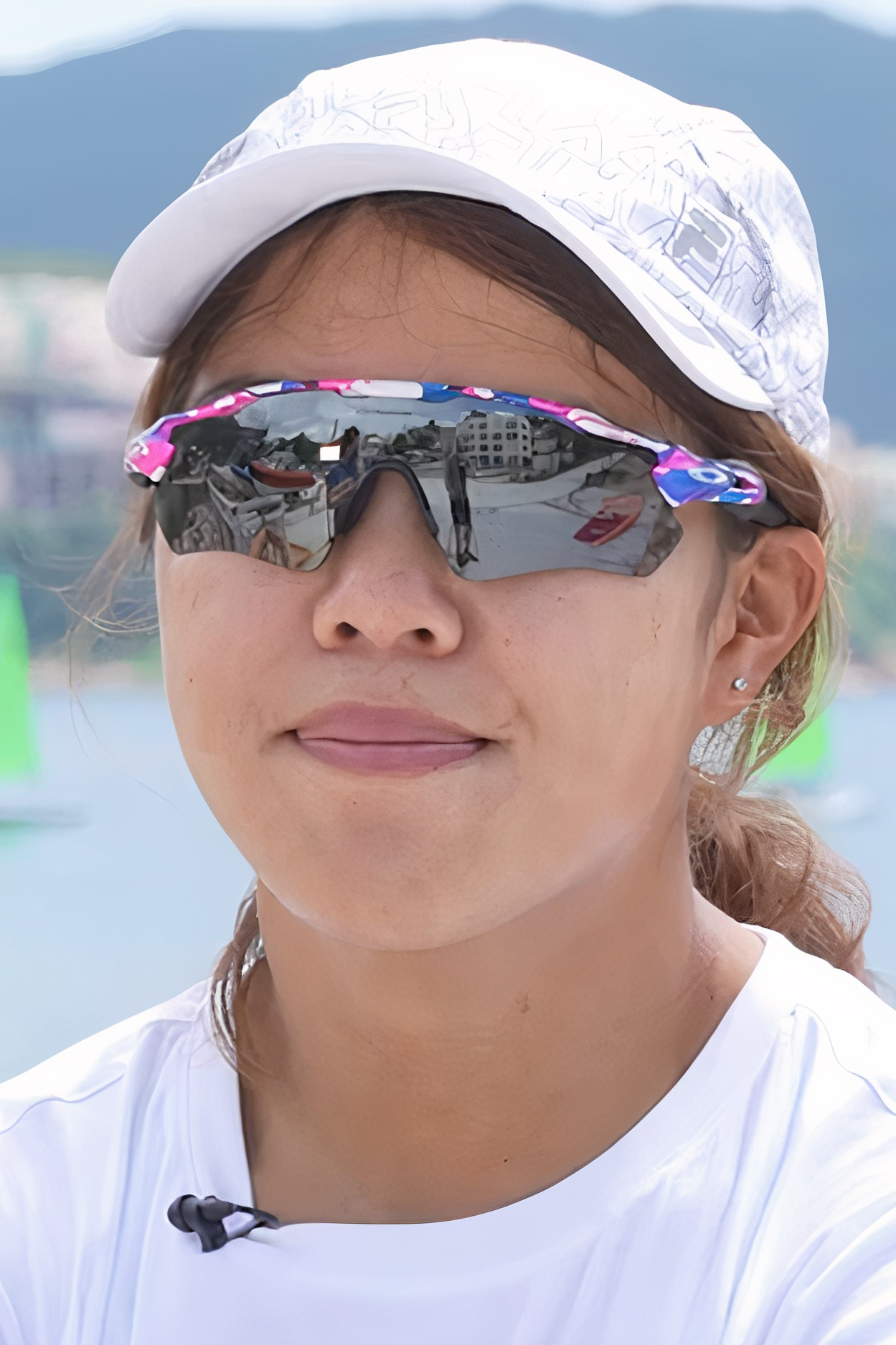
- Interviewed by am730

Personal information
- Full name: Hayley Victoria Chan
- Nationality: Hong Kong
- Born: Chan Hei-man; 10 January 1991 (age 35) Hong Kong, Hong Kong
- Height: 1.66 m (5 ft 5 in)
- Weight: 60 kg (132 lb)

Sailing career
- Sport: Sailing
- Club: Windsurfing Association of Hong; Kong
- Coached by: Chan Hai Shun
- Class: Sailboard
Medal record
Women's sailing
Representing Hong Kong
Asian Games
Silver medal – second place	2010 Guangzhou	Mistral
Gold medal – first place	2014 Incheon	RS:X
Silver medal – second place	2018 Jakarta-Palembang	RS:X

Hayley Victoria Chan (Chinese: 陳晞文, Chan Hei-man, born 10 January 1991) is a Hong Kong windsurfer, who specialised in Neil Pryde RS:X class. She captured a silver medal in windsurfing at the 2010 Asian Games, and later represented Hong Kong at the 2012 Summer Olympics. Chan trains for the Windsurfing Association of Hong Kong under her personal coach Chan Hai Shun. As of September 2013, Chan is ranked fourth in the world for the sailboard class by the International Sailing Federation, following her successes at the One World Championships in Boracay, Philippines and at the World Championships in Armação dos Búzios, Brazil.

Chan made her official worldwide debut at the 2010 Asian Games in Guangzhou, China, where she captured a silver medal in the women's Mistral class with a net score of 21, trailing host nation's Wang Ning by eight points.

At the 2012 Summer Olympics in London, Chan competed in the women's RS:X class after receiving a berth through her result at the World Championships in Perth, Australia. She narrowly missed a chance to sail for the medal race by seven points, finishing twelfth in a fleet of twenty-six sailors with a net score of 96 points.
