= Sonia Lo =

Hong Kong windsurfer (born 1992)

Personal information
- Native name: 盧善琳
- Born: Lo Sin Lam; 18 December 1992 (age 33) Hong Kong

Sailing career
- Sport: Sailing
- Class(es): RS:One, RS:X
Medal record
Women's sailing
Representing Hong Kong
Asian Games
| Silver medal – second place | 2014 Incheon | RS:One |

Lo Sin Lam (Chinese: 盧善琳, born 18 December 1992), known as Sonia Lo, is a Hong Kong windsurfer.

She qualified for the 2016 Summer Olympics in Rio de Janeiro, and was selected to represent Hong Kong in the women's RS:X event.
