= Cecilia Low =

Singaporean sailor

Personal information
- Full name: Low Rui Qi Cecilia
- Nationality: Singaporean
- Born: 1 April 1991 (age 35)

Sport
- Sport: Sailing
Medal record
Women's sailing
Representing Singapore
420 World Championship
Gold medal – first place	2012 Austria, Neusiedl am See	420
ISAF Youth World Championship
Bronze medal – third place	2009 Brazil, Buzios	420
Asian Games
Bronze medal – third place	2022 China, Hangzhou	49erFX
Gold medal – first place	2018 Jakarta, Palembang	49erFX
Silver medal – second place	2014 Korea, Incheon	29er
Gold medal – first place	2010 China, Guangzhou	420
SEA Games
Gold medal – first place	2013 Myanmar, Ngwe Saung Beach	470

Rui Qi "Cecilia" Low (born 1 April 1991) is a Singaporean sailor. She competed in the 49er FX event at the 2020 Summer Olympics.

== Sailing career ==
In 2016, Low and her teammate, Kimberly Lim, participated in the Sailing World Cup in the 49erFX class but without much success, coming in at 8th at Hyeres and 12th at Miami.

With a new coach, Fernando Kuo, Lim and Low came in third at the Trofeo Princesa Sofía sailing regatta held at Palma de Mallorca, Spain in 2017.

In the 2017 Sailing World Cup series, Low and Lim finished in ninth place at Hyères, France. With the results from Trofeo Princesa Sofía, both were able to compete at the Sailing World Cup Final held in Santander. They eventually finished in seventh place.

In 2018, Low and Lim won the gold medal at the 2018 Asian Games in the 49erFX class with one race to spare.

In 2021, Low and Lim participated at the 2020 Summer Olympics in the 49erFX class. The pair became the first Singaporean sailors to participate in a medal race in the Olympics and finished 10th, the best result in sailing for Singapore.
