= Ancol Dreamland =

Indonesian tou0ism area

Coordinates: 6°07′22″S 106°49′54″E

PT Pembangunan Jaya Ancol Tbk
- Type: Public
- Traded as: IDX: PJAA
- Industry: Tourism & Property Management
- Founded: 1966
- Headquarters: Jl. Lodan Timur 7 Jakarta, Indonesia
- Key people: C. Paul Tehusijarana (CEO), Honggo Widjojo Kangmasto (President Commissioner)
- Products: Recreations Place, and Property
- Revenue: ▲ Rp 1.28 trillion (2016)
- Net income: ▲ Rp 131 billion (2016)
- Total assets: ▲ Rp 3.769 trillion (2016)
- Total equity: ▲ Rp 1.828 trillion (2016)
- Owner: Government of Jakarta (72%); PT Pembangunan Jaya (18%); Public float (10%)
- Number of employees: 781 (2016)
- Website: www.ancol.com (in Indonesian)

Map

Taman Impian Jaya Ancol also known as Ancol Dreamland is an integral part of Ancol Bay City, a resort destination located along Jakarta's waterfront, in Ancol (Kelurahan), Pademangan, North Jakarta. It is owned by PT. Pembangunan Jaya Ancol Tbk, a subsidiary of Pembangunan Jaya Group. Ancol Dreamland opened in 1966 and is currently the largest integrated tourism area in Southeast Asia, boasting an international championship golf course, a theme park, hotels and other recreational facilities.

== History ==
Before Ancol Dreamland, Ancol was a mosquito-infested swamp and fish pond, and the source of a century-old malaria outbreak in Batavia. The idea to convert the marshy area of Ancol into Jakarta's largest entertainment center, with housing and industrial estates adjoining it, was proposed by President Sukarno in the early 1960s. The idea opposed the initial plan to convert the area of Ancol into a purely industrial area.

The development of Ancol was started during the tenure of Ali Sadikin, the governor of Jakarta in 1966. The entertainment complex was named Taman Impian Jaya Ancol or Ancol Dreamland. The first facility was the Bina Ria Ancol beach, best known for its drive-in theater especially during the 1970s, then followed with a golf course, swimming pool, oceanarium, Putri Duyung cottage, Hotel Horison and its casino. The Dunia Fantasi (Fantasy World) theme park was built in 1984 and first opened in 1985.

== Entertainment and amusement parks ==
Today, the 552 hectare recreation area is known as the Ancol Jakarta Bay City. It contains hotels, cottages, beaches, a theme park, traditional market places, an oceanarium, a golf field and marina.

=== Dunia Fantasi (Fantasy World) ===
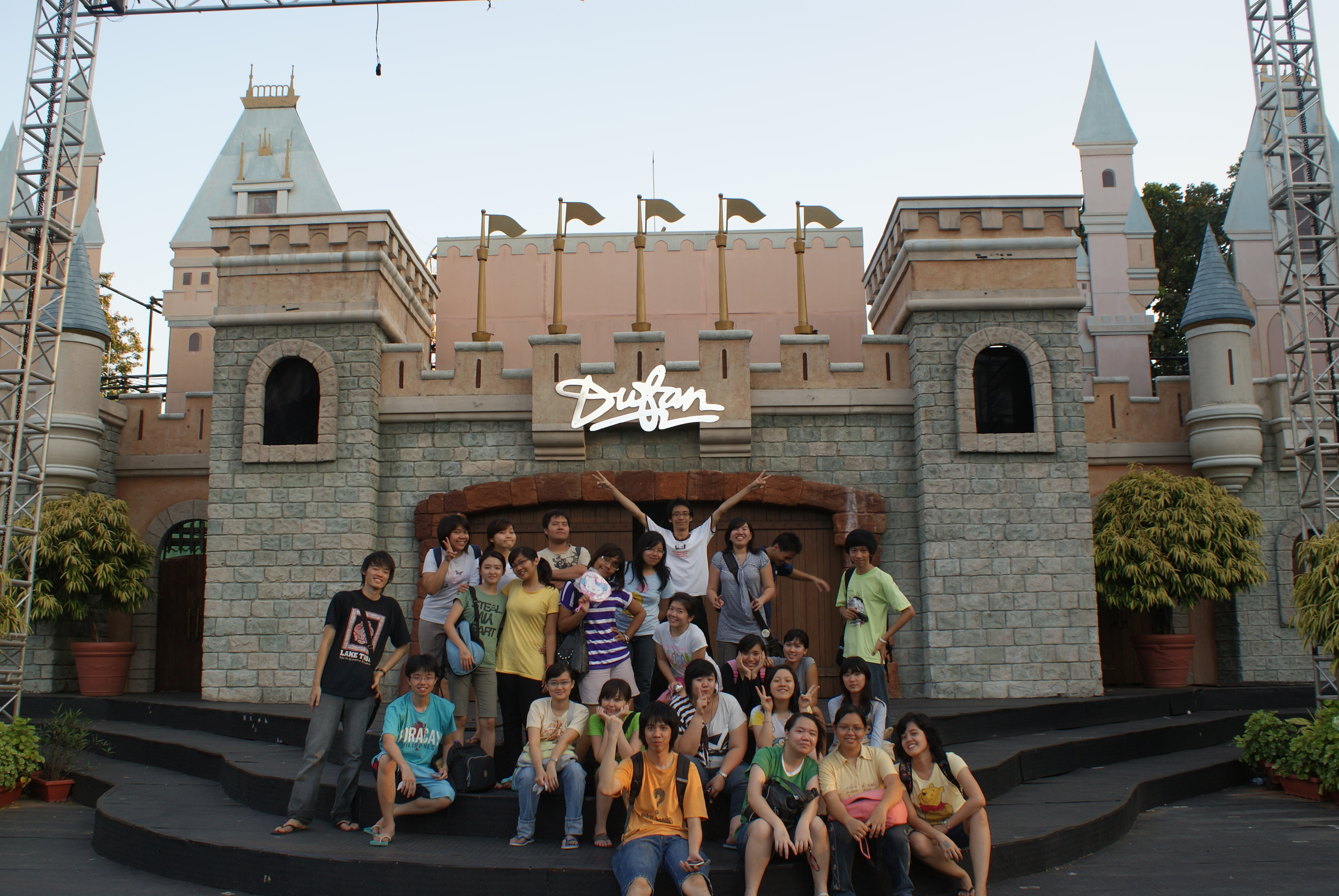
Fantasy World

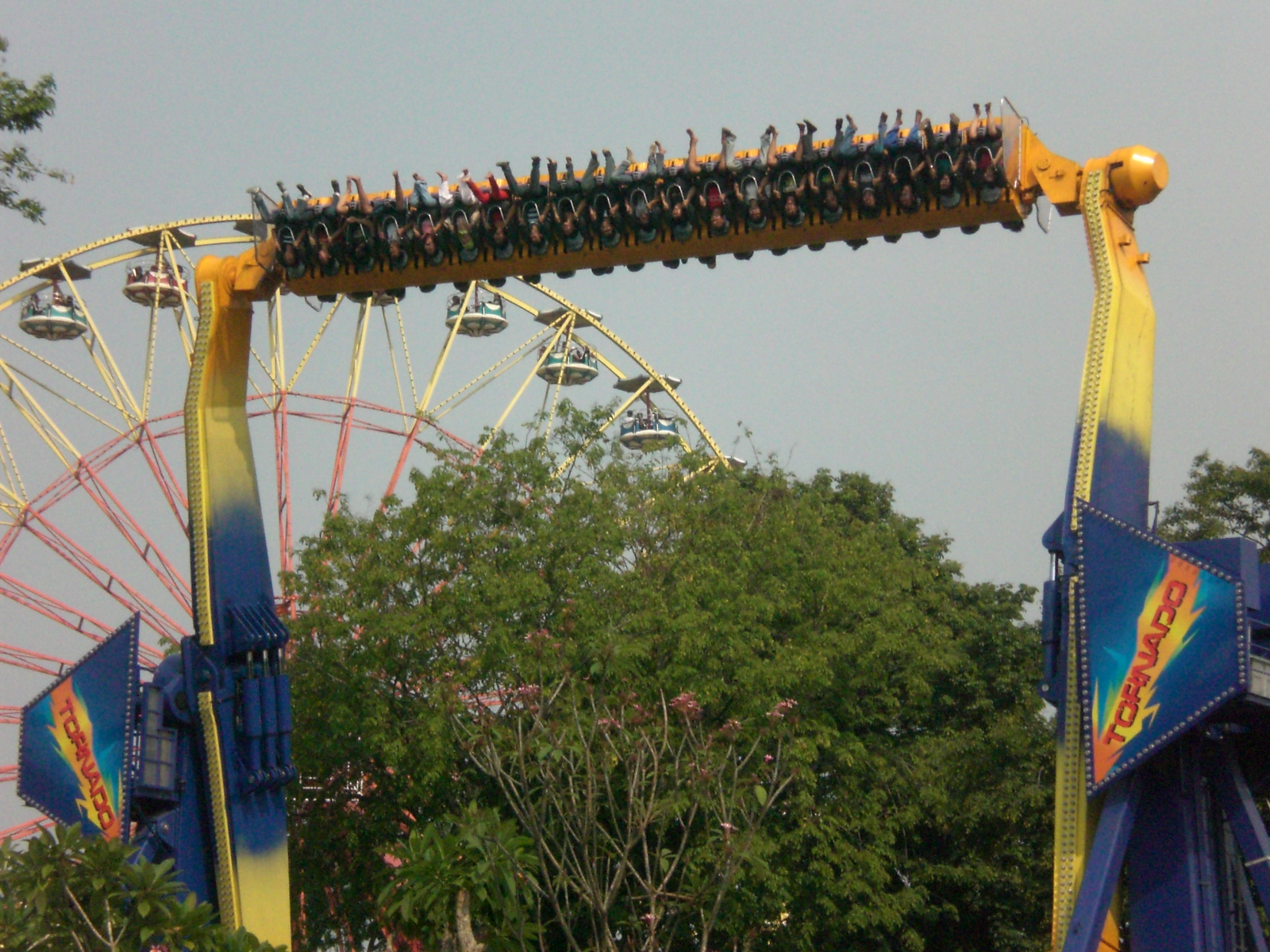
Tornado at Dunia Fantasi (Fantasy World)

Dunia Fantasi (often shortened to "Dufan") is Jakarta's own theme park complete with over 40 rides and attractions. It is located in North Jakarta, facing the Java Sea. It was opened on 29 August 1985. The theme park is divided into eight regions which are Jakarta, Indonesia, Asia, Africa, America, Europe, and Fantasi Hikayat (Legendary Fantasy) region featuring Ancient Greece and Ancient Egypt architecture. The theme park complies with international standards through ISO 9001:2000 certification. Admission to Dunia Fantasi is chargeable at around Rp 295.000 from Mondays to Fridays, and Rp 325.000 on Saturday, Sundays and public holidays. It is considered as Jakarta's largest and most interesting recreation park, and located on reclaimed land at the Bay of Jakarta. According to the Jakarta Tourism & Culture Office website, other attractions within include the Art Market, an Eco-Park and an Ocean Park. In the district of Ancol where Dunia Fantasi is located, it is a common getaway for tourists and locals alike, away from the hustle and bustle of the city.

Among its most popular attractions are Halilintar (a roller coaster manufactured by Arrow Dynamics), Niagara-gara (a log flume), Istana Boneka (a local version of Disney's It's a Small World) and Balada Kera (Monkey Parody – animatronics show) Theater show. Other attractions include Bianglala (ferris wheel), Kora-Kora (swinging ship), Poci-Poci (spinning cups ride), Kereta Misteri, (an indoor roller coaster manufactured by Intamin), and the Hysteria (drop tower).

Several of the latest and newest rides are Kicir-Kicir (Power Surge) (2004), Perang Bintang (Star Wars) (changed to Galactica a Battle for Mars since 2017) (2005) - an interactive dark ride, Meteor Attack (2006) and Tornado (Windshear by Zamperla) (2007). Some seasonal attractions include Le Belles cabaret show, Russian Circus and Euro Kids Circus.

A former Show Building that used to house the Ramashinta: Legend of The Future ride was burned in 2004 and then converted into a large indoor exhibition hall, occasionally hosting special shows. Then in 2014 is reimagined into Indoor Dufan Section that contain Ice Age: Sid's Tour, Kontiki, Hello Kitty Adventure (Rumored will be replaced).

Since June 21, 2011 Dunia Fantasi (Dufan) will open Kalila Adventure Animatronic Theater which is the most complete in the world. The theme stories are about Beautiful Indonesia. Then in 2018 Kalila Section is closed to make way the expansion of America Section in the park that contain the biggest indoor coaster in Indonesia themed to America on the 19th Century that will tell the story of the Werewolf that lived in the house.

In March 2019 the park has announced a new area set to open mid to late 2019 with 9 new attractions: Baling Baling (a Zierer Star Shape, also the first in Asia), Paralayang (an SBF Visa Group Airborne Shot), Turbo Drop (an SBF Visa Group Drop'n Twist), Fantastique 2.0 (Delay until further notice), Kereta Misteri (a werewolf themed indoor tracked ride from an Intamin Manufacturer), Karavel, Kolibri, Zig Zag and Ontang Anting.

=== Atlantis Water Adventure ===
Atlantis Water Adventure was built on the former site of Gelanggang Renang (‘swimming arena’). Occupying over five hectares (12.36 acres) of land, this water park is themed after the mythological underwater world of Atlantis. Attractions include a wave pool, continuously-flowing “lazy river”, rainbow ball pool, waterfalls, several water slides, two small children's pools, in addition to five restaurants and a food court, with various international cuisines from countries such as Bangladesh, Brazil, India and Spain. A volleyball court and an events center are also available to accommodate the needs of visitors.

=== Ocean Dream Samudra ===
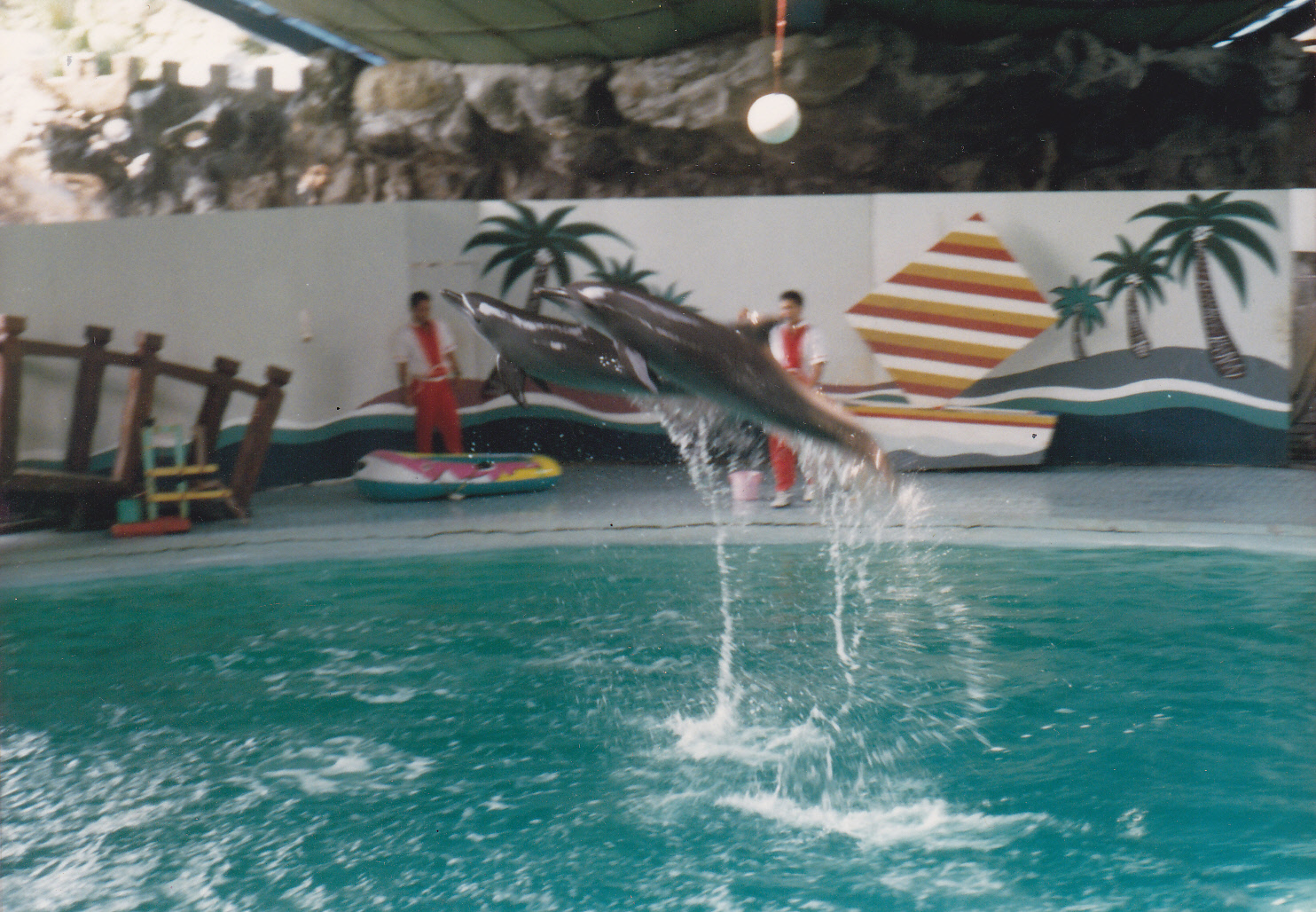
Dolphin show

Ocean Dream Samudra features several animal shows, a small aquarium, and a 4D theater. The trained animal shows include a dolphin show and sea lion show. The 4D theater projects 3D image movies with sensations such as cool breezes and water sprays located inside a large building with Mesoamerican pyramid theme. In 2011 Ocean Dream Samudra will be revitalized with a budget of Rp.27 billion ($3.1 million). Ocean Dream Samudra now holds the "Under the Sea Musical Dance" attraction at Underwater Theater.

=== Sea World Ancol ===
SeaWorld Ancol was the largest oceanarium in South East Asia at the time it was opened, in 1996, as SeaWorld Jakarta. It was owned by Lippo Group until 2014, when contract problems caused it to be owned by Jaya Ancol now. It features the acclaimed Antasena tunnel as well as the touch pool and shark aquarium. Despite its name, it is completely unaffiliated with the US-based SeaWorld Parks & Entertainment and their parks in Orlando, San Antonio, and San Diego.

=== Beaches ===
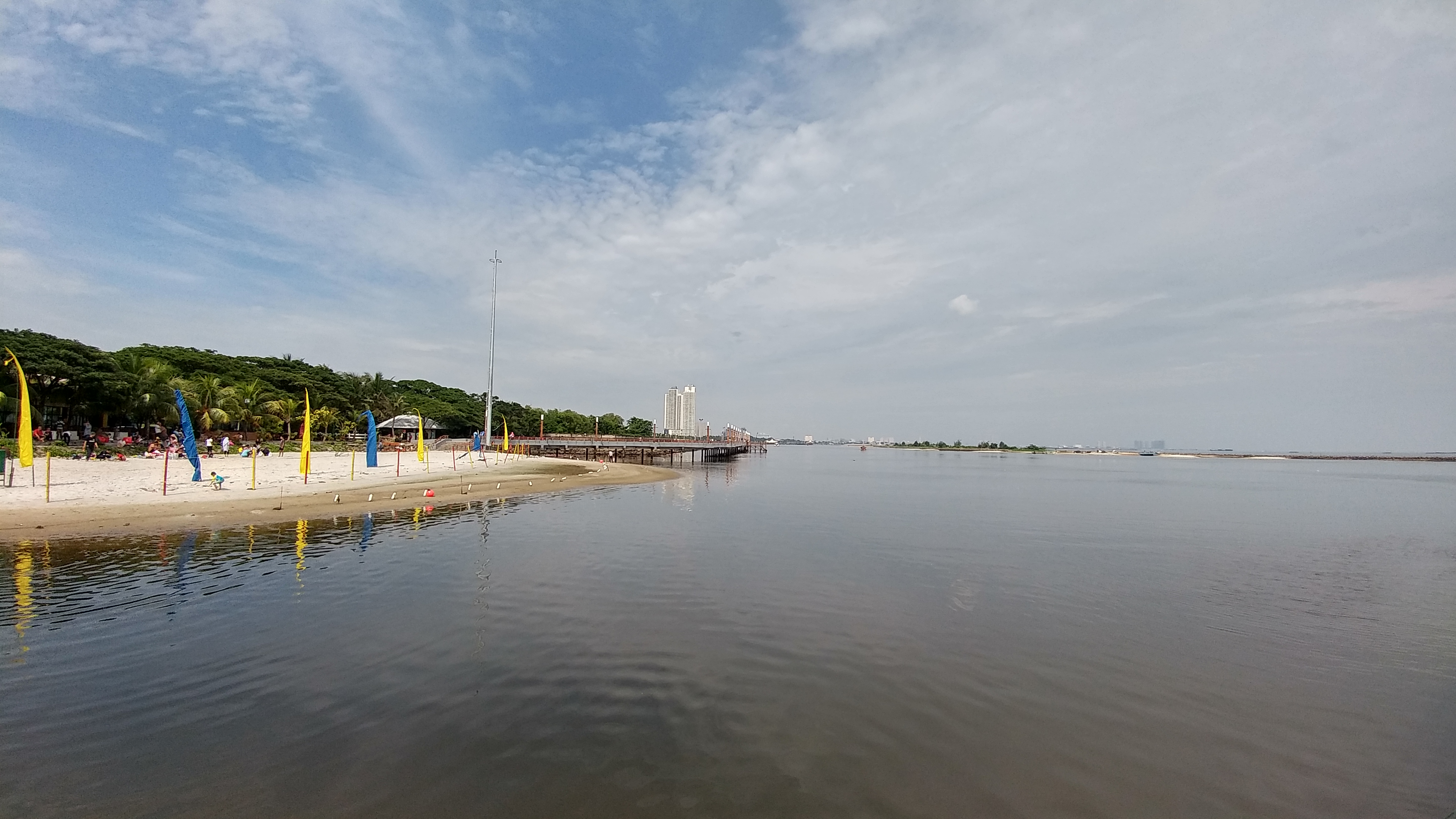
Ancol Beach

There are two main beaches within the resort, the Carnival and Festival beach. British band Iron Maiden played its first concert in Indonesia on 17 February 2011 at the Carnival Beach site, to an over 25,000 strong crowd.

=== Pasar Seni ===
Pasar Seni (lit. ‘art market’) is an art market and artist-residency which began over 25 years ago. It has since become a hub and resource for artists, creatives, makers of handicrafts, ceramics, painters and visual artworks, supplies and products. This market also has an open public area and main plaza with souvenir shops. Pasar Seni has become a destination for artists and art-buyers. Every Friday night at 20:30, Pasar Seni Ancol holds a music series, "New Friday Jazz Nite".

=== Executive Golf Fun ===
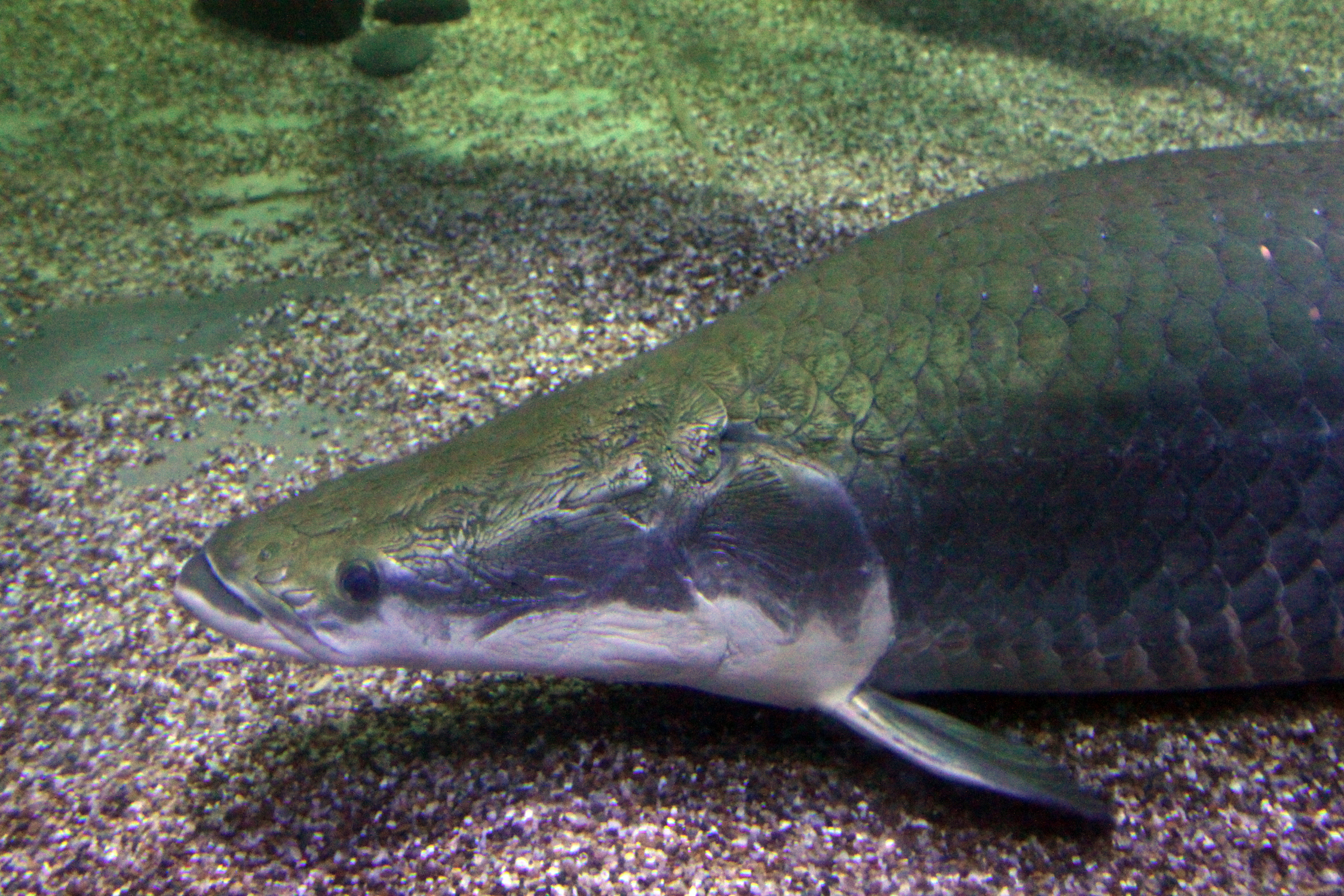
Arapaima fish at Sea World

Ancol's Golf Course has recently relaunched as Executive Golf Fun. This is Indonesia's first international beach golf course with 18 holes spread over an area of 33 hectares. The golf course has a pro-shop, an executive room, a meeting hall and restaurants.

=== Jaya Bowling ===
Ancol Dreamland has several facilities for games and entertainment. One of these facilities is Jaya Bowling. This bowling center is the first and largest bowling center in Indonesia. Indonesia's National Bowling Training Center is in Jaya Bowling.

=== Allianz Eco Park ===
Built in 2011 by PT Global Land Development Tbk, with a reported budget of Rp.15 billion ($1.7 million), Allianz Eco Park consists of four themes: Eco Energy, Eco Care, Eco Nature and Eco Art. Allianz Eco Park has hosted the 2013 World Robot Olympiad, as well as the finale and reunion episodes of Indonesian Idol (2012).

Balada Kera one of entertainment in Ancol Dreamland

Ancol Dreamland in the beginning of 1990s

=== Faunaland ===
Faunaland is a mini zoo located inside Allianz Ecopark and stands on an area of approximately 5 hectares consisting of land and water. Faunaland carries the concept of New Guinea.

=== Ancol Beach City ===
Ancol Beach City is a new Lifestyle & Entertainment Center in Ancol, Jakarta. It was built by PT Wahana Agung Indonesia, a subsidiary of PT Global Land Development Tbk (now MNC Land). It contains a Madame Tussauds Wax Museum, Beach City International Stadium concert hall with a maximum capacity of 22.000, 77 culinary centre, 42 shops, etc.

=== Jakarta International e-Prix Circuit ===
A racing circuit is located on the eastern proper of Ancol Dreamland, named Jakarta International e-Prix Circuit. With a length of 2.370 kilometres (1.473 mi), it hosts the annual Jakarta ePrix of the FIA Formula E Championship. The circuit encircles Ancol Beach City and was opened during the first edition of Jakarta ePrix on 4 June 2022.

== Transportation ==
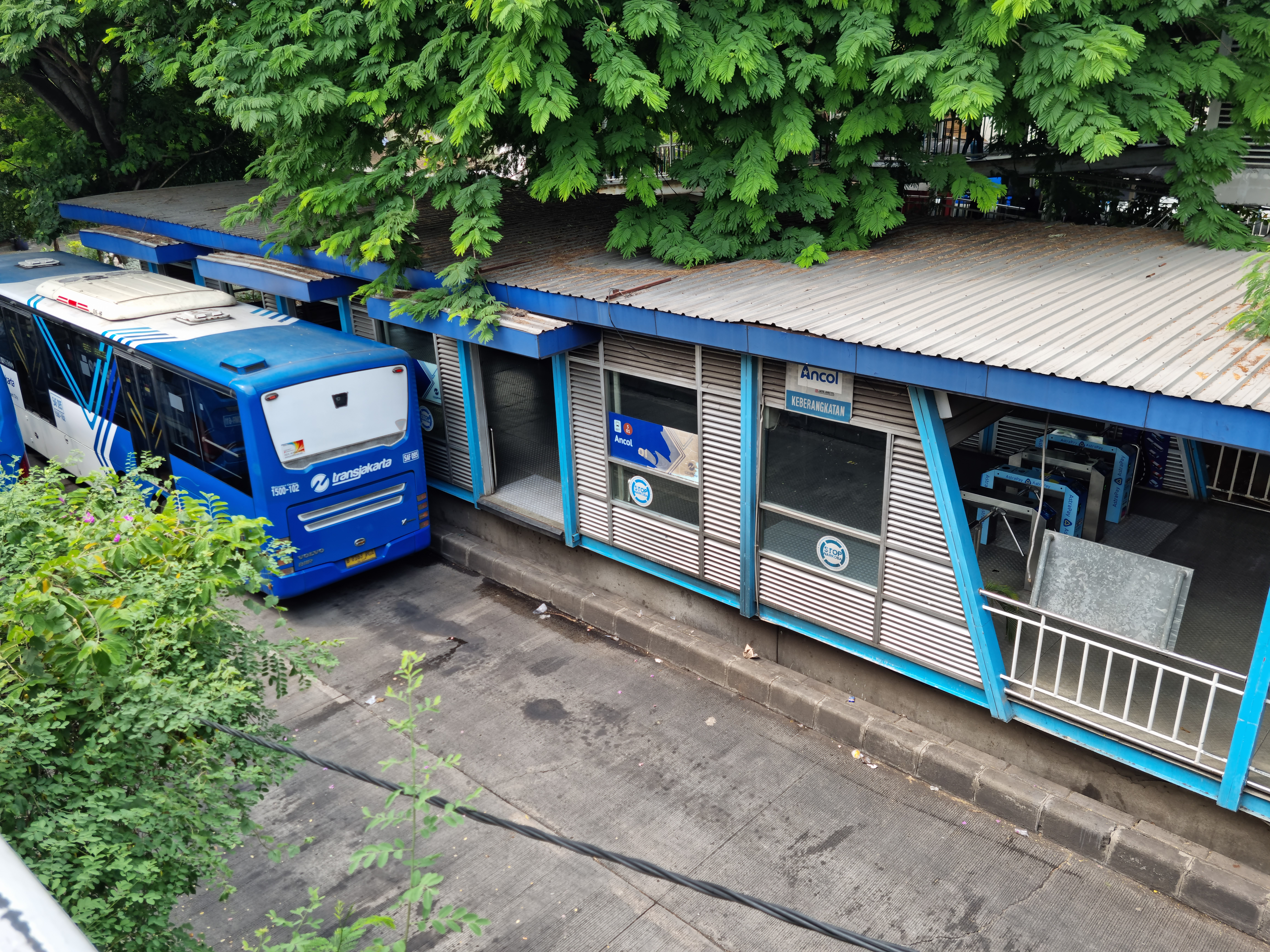
The Ancol terminus station of the Transjakarta bus rapid transit

Ancol Dreamland can be reached by car, motorcycle, KRL Commuterline, or the Transjakarta BRT. Passengers who want to go to Ancol Dreamland by train can alight at Ancol or Jakarta International Stadium stations. Because Ancol Dreamland is so large, effective transportation has been a concern. Some transportation methods around Ancol Dreamland include wara-wiri shuttle bus service and gondola to help tourists navigate around the area to their next destination. Passengers from Kampung Melayu in East Jakarta can use Transjakarta Corridor 5 to go to Ancol Dreamland, and those from Blok M in South Jakarta can take route 1W to Ancol Dreamland. Every Sunday morning from 06:00 to 10:00, Transjakarta provides a specialized shuttle route labeled 51ST from Bundaran Senayan BRT station during the car-free day event at Ancol. Instead of terminating at the designated bus station near the west entrance gate, route 51ST terminates at the Symphony of the Sea roundabout just after passing the east entrance. People can access Ancol Dreamland free of charge when using this specialized service only. During Eid al-Fitr and Christmas holiday seasons, Transjakarta provides a seasonal route from Juanda railway station to Ancol Dreamland, namely route 5H.

=== Gondola ===
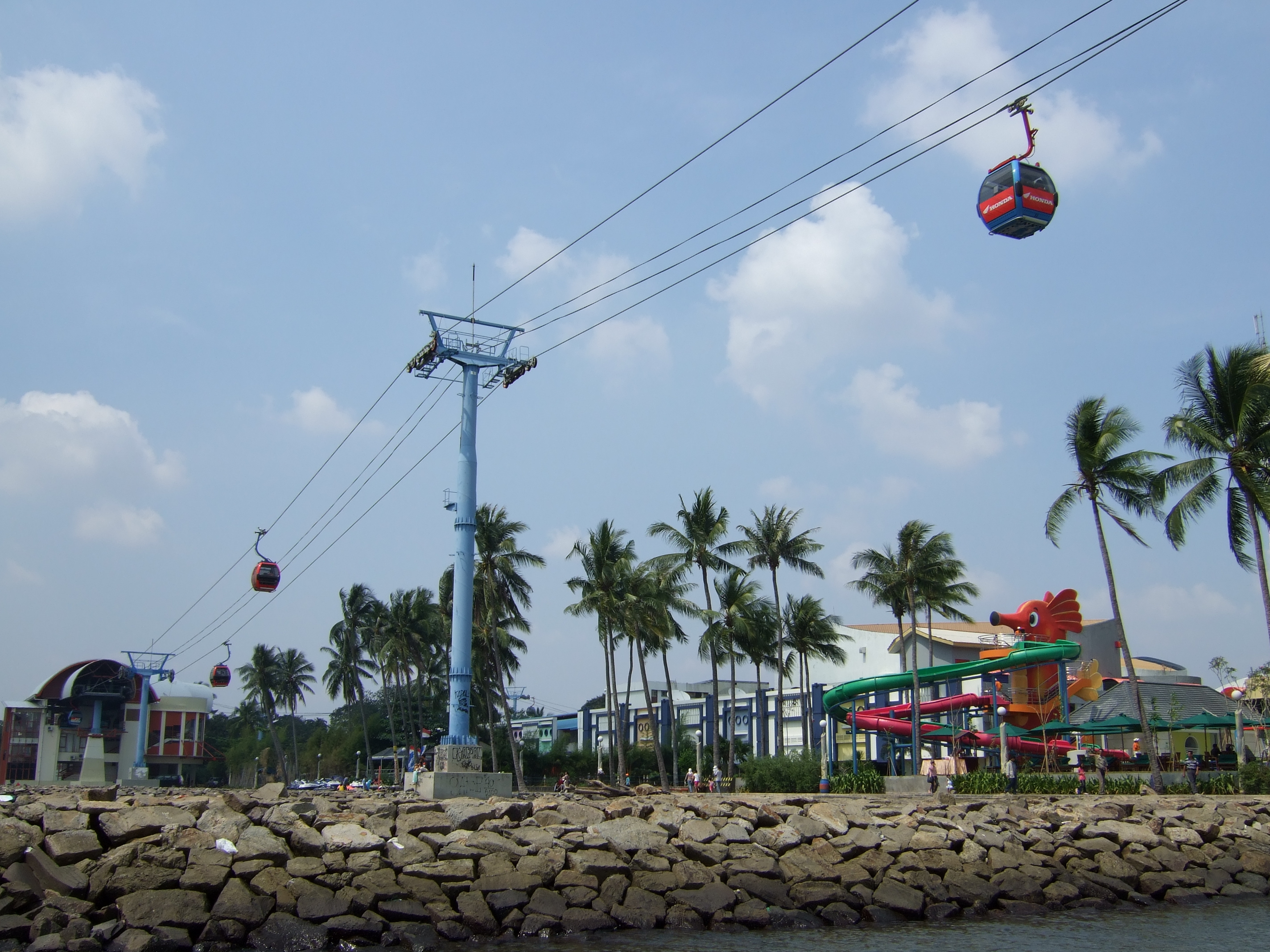
Ancol Gondola

This is the latest transportation alternative in the area. The Gondola is a skylift cable car system with thirty-seven cars built along the shore of Jakarta's bay. It offers a view of the resort and the sea as well as the city.

=== Wara-Wiri buses ===
Ancol Dreamland provides a free shuttle bus service named Wara-Wiri. It operates from 06:00 – 24:00 and consist of three routes:

- Southern line (Blue Line), stops at:
  - Gondola station (nearby Atlantis Water Adventure, Sea World, Ocean Dream Samudera and Jakarta Bird Land)
  - Pasar Seni
  - Ecovention Hall
  - Dufan
  - Danau Ancol
  - Gondola station (nearby Atlantis Water Adventure, Sea World, Ocean Dream Samudera and Jakarta Bird Land)
- Western line (Yellow Line)
  - Pintu Gerbang Barat (west entrance gate)
  - Transjakarta (Ancol bus station)
  - Marina
  - Pantai Festival
  - Pantai Indah
  - Putri Duyung
  - Ecopark Ancol
  - Halilintar
  - Dufan
  - Pintu Gerbang Barat (west entrance gate)
- Northern line (Red Line)
  - Taman Lumba-Lumba (nearby Atlantis Water Adventure, Sea World, Ocean Dream Samudera and Jakarta Bird Land)
  - Danau Ancol
  - Symphony of the Sea
  - Pantai Lagoon
  - Pantai Carnaval
  - Bende (Gong Ancol)
  - Beach Pool
  - Symphony of the Sea
  - Taman Lumba-Lumba (nearby Atlantis Water Adventure, Sea World, Ocean Dream Samudera and Jakarta Bird Land)

== Hotels ==
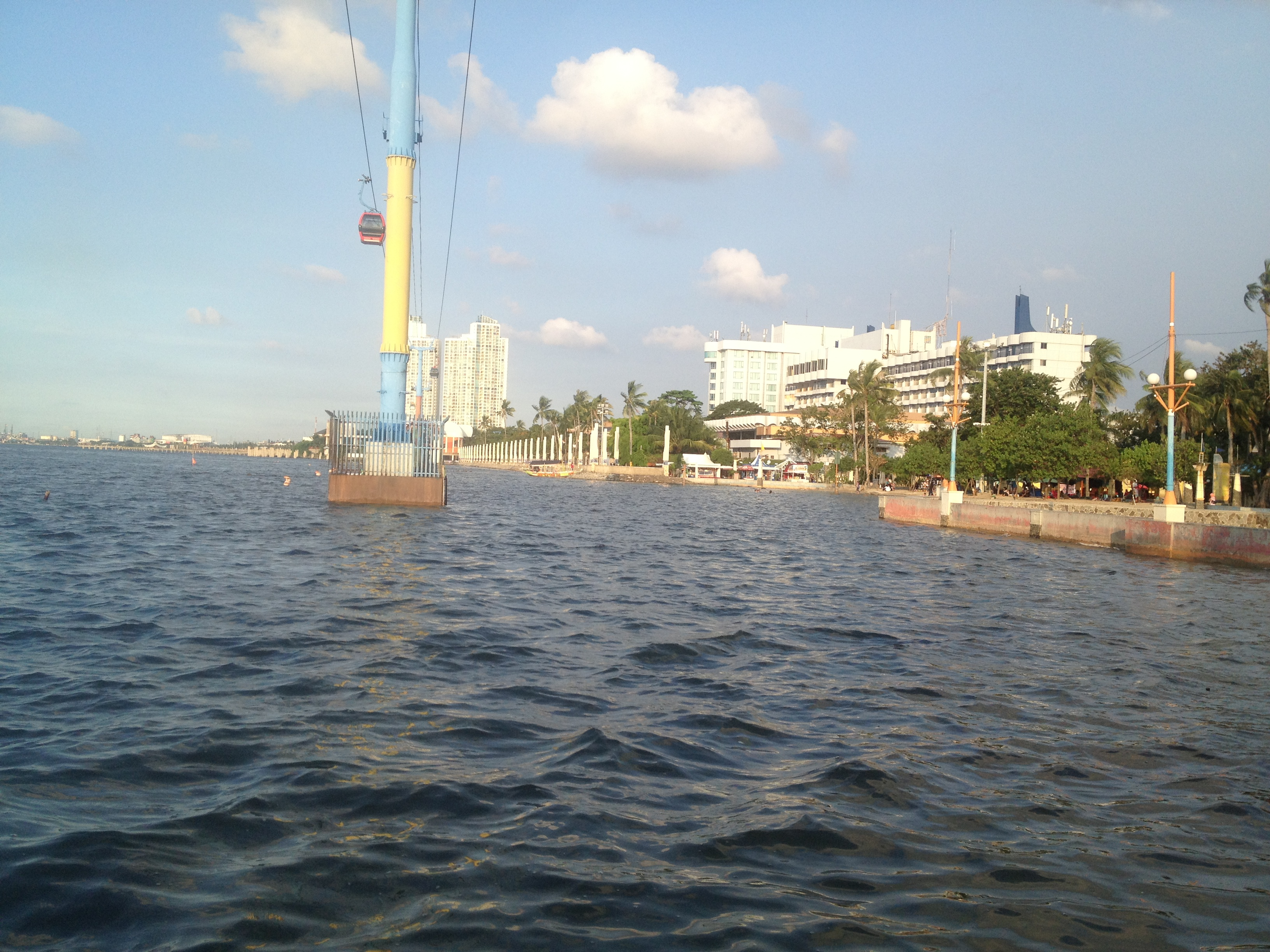
Seaside hotels at Ancol beach

- Putri Duyung Cottage is the home of beach cottages with over 137 waterfront rooms. Putri Duyung Cottage is also one of building projects of PT Global Land Development Tbk.
- Mercure Convention Centre, formerly the Hotel Horison, is a four-star hotel that consists of a hotel tower and large mice facility. The hotel was built in the 1970s as the largest hotel at Ancol. In the 1970s, there was the Copacabana Casino, one of the three legal casinos in Jakarta that were licensed in 1967 by Governor Ali Sadikin (the others being casinos on Jalan Thamrin and Jalan Hayam Wuruk) in order to raise venture to help fund development of the city's infrastructure. Pressure from religious leaders eventually forced the government to ban all gambling in 1981.
- Hotel Raddin Ancol is an Accor's Mercure managed hotel located by the side of Dunia Fantasi.

== Residential ==
Ancol project also included a residential development to the east of Putri Duyung Cottage developed back in the 1970s. Some of the residential projects were the Ancol Mansion apartment complex.

== Future developments ==
Ancol Taman Impian is planned to be expanded mainly through land reclamation along Jakarta's bay with a land reserve of over eighty hectares. A long-term goal includes a major project named Ocean Fantasy (Theme Park names not yet final and may be changed in the future as Ancol does not yet speak further of this project) as well as the construction of the Marina Sports Centre and Carnival Beach Club. This year, Ancol is going to build the Bird Park right next to Ocean Dream Samudra.

== Accidents ==
A cement-based decorative wall of a water slide of the Atlantis Water Adventure Park collapsed due to corrosion and made a part of the wall of water slide also collapse on September 25, 2011 injuring four visitors, including a child. The Jakarta Construction Supervision and Regulation Agency said, "There will be an audit by a consultant before the management is allowed to rebuild the collapsed structure." Less than 3 months previously, there was another cement structure that collapsed and in July 2011, fifteen passengers panicked when they were stuck on their seats when the Tornado thrill ride stalled.

== See also ==
- Ancol
- Jakarta
- Vihara Bahtera Bhakti

== Cited works ==
- Merrillees, Scott (2015). Jakarta: Portraits of a Capital 1950-1980. Jakarta: Equinox Publishing. ISBN 9786028397308.
