= Sailing at the 2010 Asian Games =

- Venue: Shanwei Water Sports Center
- Dates: 14–20 November 2010
- Competitors: 167 from 17 nations

Sailing at the 2010 Asian Games was held in Shanwei Water Sports Center, Shanwei, China from 14 to 20 November 2010.

== Schedule ==
●	Round	●	Last round	P	Preliminary	F	Finals

Event↓/Date →	14th Sun	15th Mon	16th Tue	17th Wed	18th Thu	19th Fri	20th Sat	
Men's Mistral	●●	●●	●●	●●		●	●●●	
Men's RS:X	●●	●●	●●	●●		●	●●●	
Men's Laser	●●	●●	●●	●●		●●	●●	
Boys' Optimist	●●	●●	●●	●●		●●	●●	
Boys' 420	●●	●●	●●	●●		●	●●●	
Men's 470	●●	●●	●●	●●		●	●●●	
Women's Mistral	●●	●●	●●	●●		●	●●●	
Women's RS:X	●●	●●	●●	●●		●	●●●	
Girls' Optimist	●●	●●	●	●●●		●●	●●	
Girls' 420	●●	●●	●●	●●		●	●●●	
Women's 470	●●	●●	●●	●●		●	●●●	
Open Laser Radial	●●	●●	●●	●●		●●	●●	
Open Hobie 16	●●	●●	●●	●●		●	●●●	
Open match racing			P	P		P	P	F

== Medalists ==
=== Men ===
Event	Gold	Silver	Bronze
Mistral	Chan King Yin; Hong Kong	Oka Sulaksana; Indonesia	Yao Fuwen; China
RS:X	Wang Aichen; China	Ek Boonsawad; Thailand	Lee Tae-hoon; South Korea
Laser	Ha Jee-min; South Korea	Colin Cheng; Singapore	Chen Huichao; China
Optimist	Zhang Xiaotian; China	Ahmad Latif Khan; Malaysia	Ryan Lo; Singapore
420	Singapore; Justin Liu; Sherman Cheng	South Korea; Lee Sang-min; Yang Ho-yeob	Malaysia; Ku Anas Ku Zamil; Hafizzudin Mazelan
470	Japan; Ryunosuke Harada; Yugo Yoshida	China; Wang Weidong; Deng Daokun	South Korea; Kim Dae-young; Jung Sung-ahn

=== Women ===
Event	Gold	Silver	Bronze
Mistral	Wang Ning; China	Hayley Chan; Hong Kong	Napalai Tansai; Thailand
RS:X	Sun Sasa; China	Chan Wai Kei; Hong Kong	Sarocha Prumprai; Thailand
Optimist	Noppakao Poonpat; Thailand	Kimberly Lim; Singapore	Lu Yuting; China
420	Singapore; Rachel Lee; Cecilia Low	Malaysia; Khairunnisa Afendy; Norashikin Sayed	China; Wei Mengxi; Gao Haiyan
470	Japan; Ai Kondo; Wakako Tabata	China; Cai Liping; Gao Yang	Singapore; Dawn Liu; Siobhan Tam

=== Open ===
Event	Gold	Silver	Bronze
Laser Radial	Keerati Bualong; Thailand	Hisaki Nagai; Japan	Scott Glen Sydney; Singapore
Hobie 16	Thailand; Damrongsak Vongtim; Kitsada Vongtim	South Korea; Jun Joo-hyun; Jeong Gweon	Singapore; Teo Wee Chin; Justin Wong
Match racing	Japan; Wataru Sakamoto; Daichi Wada; Yasuhiro Okamoto; Hiroaki Yoshifuji	India; Farokh Tarapore; Balraj; Atool Sinha; Shekhar Singh Yadav; Balkrishna Helegaonkar	South Korea; Park Gun-woo; Lee Dong-woo; Kim Sung-wok; Cho Sung-min; Nam Yong-jin

== Medal table ==
Rank	Nation	Gold	Silver	Bronze	Total
1	China (CHN)	4	2	4	10
2	Thailand (THA)	3	1	2	6
3	Japan (JPN)	3	1	0	4
4	Singapore (SIN)	2	2	4	8
5	South Korea (KOR)	1	2	3	6
6	Hong Kong (HKG)	1	2	0	3
7	Malaysia (MAS)	0	2	1	3
8	India (IND)	0	1	0	1
8	Indonesia (INA)	0	1	0	1
Totals (9 entries)		14	14	14	42

== Participating nations ==
A total of 167 athletes from 17 nations competed in sailing at the 2010 Asian Games:

- Bahrain (6)
- China (23)
- Hong Kong (8)
- India (8)
- Indonesia (5)
- Iran (9)
- Japan (14)
- Kyrgyzstan (2)
- Malaysia (18)
- Pakistan (14)
- Philippines (3)
- Qatar (1)
- Singapore (20)
- South Korea (17)
- Sri Lanka (4)
- Thailand (13)
- United Arab Emirates (2)
