= 1982 IYRU Youth Sailing World Championships – 420 =

420 at the 1982 IYRU Youth Sailing World Championships
- Venue: Livorno, Italy
- Dates: 1 - 10 September
- Competitors: 46 from 23 nations

Medalists
gold medal	Fernando León Boissier; Nunez	Spain
silver medal	Dennis Jones; Anthony Dean	Australia
bronze medal	Georg Hecht; Zander	Germany

The 420 competition at the 1982 IYRU Youth Sailing World Championships took place between September 1 and 10.

== Results ==
Pos	Helm	Crew	Country	P1	P2	P3	P4	P5	P6		
1st	Fernando León Boissier	Nunez	Spain	4	1	(7)	7	1	1	21	14
2nd	Dennis Jones	Anthony Dean	Australia	2	3	1	(15)	7	6	34	19
3rd	Georg Hecht	Zander	Germany	10	2	3	(18)	3	5	41	23
4th	Björn Bengtsson		Sweden	1	4	2	14	5	(20)	46	26
5th	Hofer	Paewlka	Austria	7	9	6	(17)	2	2	43	26
6th	Greenwood	David Clark	New Zealand	6	(12)	12	1	4	8	43	31
7th	Goyan	Shaddan	United States	5	(13)	8	9	6	3	44	31
8th	Le Troquer	Hay	France	12	5	10	4	(15)	4	50	35
9th	Zeltner	Seger	Switzerland	(30 DSQ)	8	14	2	13	7	74	44
10th	Andrewes	Doyle	Zimbabwe	9	10	(30 DSQ)	8	10	9	76	46
11th	Maldonado	Da Silva	Portugal	(16)	11	4	12	14	10	67	51
12th	Jason Belben	Andrew Hemmings	United Kingdom	3	7	(30 OCS)	10	30 DSQ	13	93	63
13th	Paul Natorp	Hans Natorp	Denmark	11	6	17	(30 DSQ)	11	11	86	56
14th	Van De Rest	Van Beek	Netherlands	14	16	9	3	(18)	18	78	60
15th	Andrea Mura	Ciabatti	Italy	(30 DSQ)	30 DSQ	5	5	8	19	97	67
16th	Theo Lyttle	Stephen Saunders	Ireland	13	(30 DSQ)	11	13	9	15	91	61
17th	Hank Lammens	J. Lammens	Canada	(18)	14	15	6	16	16	85	67
18th	Marinac	Nicolich	Yugoslavia	8	(30 DSQ)	30 RET	11	12	17	108	78
19th	Ellis	Patterson	Hong Kong	19	(30 DSQ)	19	16	17	14	115	85
20th	Leskinen	Backman	Finland	15	17	13	20	21	(23)	109	86
21st	D. Pahoumasa	Pahoumas	Greece	17	(30 DSQ)	18	30 DSQ	19	12	126	96
22nd	Saneyers	Van Huyneghem	Belgium	20	15	16	19	20	(21)	111	90
23rd	Hermann Megenthaler	Caso	Mexico	21	18	(30 RET)	30 RET	22	22	143	113
