= Sailing at the 2010 Asian Games – Men's 470 =

Men's 470 at the 2010 Asian Games
- Venue: Shanwei Water Sports Center
- Date: 14–20 November 2010
- Competitors: 14 from 7 nations

Medalists
gold medal	Ryunosuke Harada; Yugo Yoshida	Japan
silver medal	Wang Weidong; Deng Daokun	China
bronze medal	Kim Dae-young; Jung Sung-ahn	South Korea

The men's 470 competition at the 2010 Asian Games in Shanwei was held from 14 to 20 November 2010.

== Schedule ==
All times are China Standard Time (UTC+08:00)

Date	Time	Event
Sunday, 14 November 2010	12:00	Race 1
Sunday, 14 November 2010	12:00	Race 2
Monday, 15 November 2010	12:00	Race 3
Monday, 15 November 2010	12:00	Race 4
Tuesday, 16 November 2010	12:00	Race 5
Tuesday, 16 November 2010	12:00	Race 6
Wednesday, 17 November 2010	12:00	Race 7
Wednesday, 17 November 2010	12:00	Race 8
Friday, 19 November 2010	12:00	Race 9
Saturday, 20 November 2010	12:00	Race 10
Saturday, 20 November 2010	12:00	Race 11
Saturday, 20 November 2010	12:00	Race 12

== Results ==
Rank	Team	Race												Total
Rank	Team	1	2	3	4	5	6	7	8	9	10	11	12	Total
1st place, gold medalist(s)	Japan (JPN); Ryunosuke Harada; Yugo Yoshida	1	1	2	~~(3)~~	1	1	1	3	1	2	2	2	17
2nd place, silver medalist(s)	China (CHN); Wang Weidong; Deng Daokun	2	2	1	1	~~(6)~~	5	3	1	6	1	1	1	24
3rd place, bronze medalist(s)	South Korea (KOR); Kim Dae-young; Jung Sung-ahn	4	3	3	2	4	4	~~(5)~~	2	2	3	3	3	33
4	Singapore (SIN); Roy Tay; Terence Koh	3	4	5	4	2	3	~~(6)~~	4	3	4	4	4	40
5	Philippines (PHI); Emerson Villena; Lester Tayong	5	6	4	5	3	2	2	5	5	~~(7)~~	5	5	47
6	Malaysia (MAS); Razman Mat Ali; Ahmad Hakhimi	6	5	~~(7)~~	7	5	6	4	6	4	5	7	7	62
7	Pakistan (PAK); Xerxes Byram Avari; Mehboob Rafiq	~~(7)~~	7	6	6	7	7	7	7	7	6	6	6	72
