= Sailing at the 1984 Summer Olympics – 470 =

Sailing at the Olympics

470 at the Games of the XXIII Olympiad
- 470
- Venue: Long Beach
- Dates: 31 July to 8 August
- Competitors: 56 from 28 nations
- Teams: 28

Medalists
1st place, gold medalist(s)		Luis Doreste; Roberto Molina	Spain
2nd place, silver medalist(s)		Stephen Benjamin; Christopher H. Steinfeld	United States
3rd place, bronze medalist(s)		Thierry Peponnet; Luc Pillot	France

The 470 was a sailing event on the Sailing at the 1984 Summer Olympics program in Long Beach, Los Angeles County, California . Seven races were scheduled. 56 sailors, on 28 boats, from 28 nations competed.

== Results ==
Rank	Helmsman (Country)	Crew	Race I		Race II		Race III		Race IV		Race V		Race VI		Race VII		Total Points	Total -1
Rank	Helmsman (Country)	Crew	Rank	Points	Rank	Points	Rank	Points	Rank	Points	Rank	Points	Rank	Points	Rank	Points	Total Points	Total -1
1st place, gold medalist(s)	Luis Doreste (ESP)	Roberto Molina	3	5.7	1	0.0	5	10.0	2	3.0	1	0.0	9	15.0	~~DNS~~	~~35.0~~	68.7	33.7
2nd place, silver medalist(s)	Stephen Benjamin (USA)	Chris Steinfeld	10	16.0	2	3.0	1	0.0	4	8.0	~~PMS~~	~~35.0~~	7	13.0	2	3.0	78.0	43.0
3rd place, bronze medalist(s)	Thierry Peponnet (FRA)	Luc Pillot	2	3.0	9	15.0	~~14~~	~~20.0~~	8	14.0	3	5.7	1	0.0	6	11.7	69.4	49.4
4	Wolfgang Hunger (FRG)	Joachim Hunger	1	0.0	13	19.0	3	5.7	6	11.7	~~DSQ~~	~~35.0~~	3	5.7	4	8.0	85.1	50.1
5	Tommaso Chieffi (ITA)	Enrico Chieffi	5	10.0	5	10.0	4	8.0	1	0.0	~~PMS~~	~~35.0~~	8	14.0	9	15.0	92.0	57.0
6	Peter von Koskull (FIN)	Johan von Koskull	4	8.0	6	11.7	6	11.7	7	13.0	5	10.0	~~18~~	~~24.0~~	7	13.0	91.4	67.4
7	Cathy Foster (GBR)	Peter Newlands	~~14~~	~~20.0~~	7	13.0	9	15.0	5	10.0	7	13.0	13	19.0	1	0.0	90.0	70.0
8	Shimshon Brockman (ISR)	Eitan Friedlander	~~13~~	~~19.0~~	8	14.0	11	17.0	12	18.0	4	8.0	2	3.0	5	10.0	89.0	70.0
9	John Stavenuiter (NED)	Guido Alkemade	6	11.7	~~19~~	~~25.0~~	2	3.0	3	5.7	12	18.0	14	20.0	11	17.0	100.4	75.4
10	Carlos Irigoyen (ARG)	Gonzalo Heredia	~~DSQ~~	~~35.0~~	3	5.7	8	14.0	13	19.0	10	16.0	10	16.0	14	20.0	125.7	90.7
11	Yutaka Takagi (JPN)	Satoru Yamamoto	11	17.0	4	8.0	7	13.0	11	17.0	8	14.0	~~DSQ~~	~~35.0~~	18	24.0	128.0	93.0
12	Charles Favre (SUI)	Luc DuBois	7	13.0	14	20.0	13	19.0	~~16~~	~~22.0~~	6	11.7	11	17.0	12	18.0	120.7	98.7
13	Marco Paradeda (BRA)	Rolf Nehn	17	23.0	16	22.0	16	22.0	9	15.0	2	3.0	~~19~~	~~25.0~~	8	14.0	124.0	99.0
14	Peter Evans (NZL)	Sean Reeves	8	14.0	15	21.0	10	16.0	~~DSQ~~	~~35.0~~	PMS	35.0	5	10.0	3	5.7	136.7	101.7
15	Frank McLaughlin (CAN)	Martin Tenhove	9	15.0	10	16.0	~~19~~	25.0	17	23.0	15	21.0	4	8.0	13	19.0	127.0	102.0
16	Dan Lovén (SWE)	Magnus Holmberg	12	18.0	17	23.0	15	21.0	14	20.0	~~DSQ~~	~~35.0~~	6	11.7	16	22.0	150.7	115.7
17	Farokh Tarapore (IND)	Dhruv Bhandari	15	21.0	20	26.0	12	18.0	18	24.0	11	17.0	~~DNF~~	~~35.0~~	17	23.0	164.0	129.0
18	Alberto González (CHI)	Juan Barahona	21	27.0	~~22~~	~~28.0~~	21	27.0	20	26.0	13	19.0	15	21.0	10	16.0	164.0	136.0
19	Lim Kui-aon (TPE)	Lim Yal-aon	16	22.0	~~23~~	~~29.0~~	17	23.0	19	25.0	14	20.0	16	22.0	19	25.0	166.0	137.0
20	Hermann Megenthaler (MEX)	Alejandro Terrones	19	25.0	18	24.0	22	28.0	15	21.0	~~DSQ~~	~~35.0~~	17	23.0	15	21.0	177.0	142.0
21	Chris Tillett (AUS)	Richard Lumb	~~DSQ~~	~~35.0~~	11	17.0	18	24.0	10	16.0	PMS	35.0	12	18.0	DNF	35.0	180.0	145.0
22	Munir Sadid (PAK)	Mohammad Zakaullah	20	26.0	21	27.0	20	26.0	21	27.0	9	15.0	20	26.0	~~DNF~~	~~35.0~~	182.0	147.0
23	Gunnlaugur Jónasson (ISL)	Jón Pétursson	18	24.0	12	18.0	~~DSQ~~	~~35.0~~	24	30.0	16	22.0	21	27.0	20	26.0	182.0	147.0
24	Xu Xianyuan (CHN)	Zheng Kaiping	~~DSQ~~	~~35.0~~	24	30.0	23	29.0	23	29.0	17	23.0	21	27.0	22	28.0	201.0	166.0
25	Keith Barker (IVB)	Peter Barker	22	28.0	25	31.0	24	30.0	22	28.0	YMP	23.0	24	30.0	~~DNF~~	~~35.0~~	205.0	170.0
26	Eric Zucker (ISV)	Trace Tervo	24	30.0	26	32.0	27	33.0	~~25~~	~~31.0~~	18	24.0	23	29.0	22	28.0	207.0	174.0
27	Lalin Jirasinha (SRI)	Ranil Dias	23	29.0	27	~~33.0~~	26	32.0	26	32.0	20	26.0	25	31.0	23	29.0	212.0	179.0
28	John Bodden (CAY)	Carson Ebanks	25	31.0	28	34.0	25	31.0	27	33.0	21	27.0	26	32.0	~~DNF~~	~~35.0~~	223.0	188.0

DNF = Did Not Finish, DNS= Did Not Start, DSQ = Disqualified, PMS = Premature Start, YMP = Yacht Materially Prejudiced
= Male, = Female

=== Daily standings ===
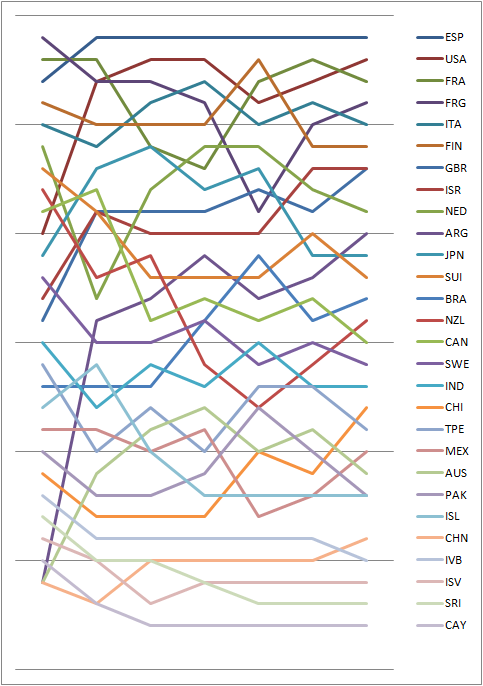
Graph showing the daily standings in the 470 during the 1984 Summer Olympics

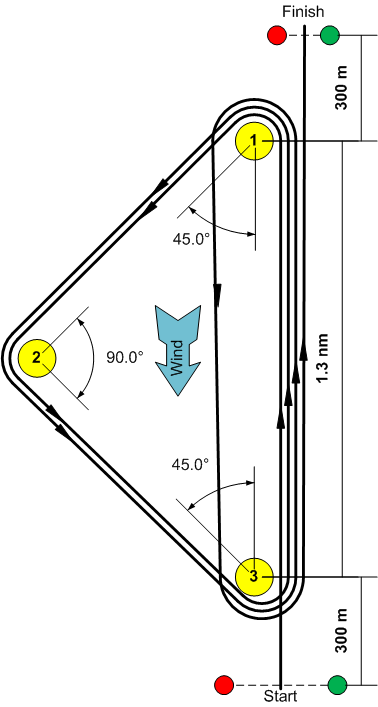
470 Course Map
