= 1982 IYRU Youth Sailing World Championships – Europe =

Europe at the 1982 IYRU Youth Sailing World Championships
- Venue: Livorno, Italy
- Dates: 1 - 10 September
- Competitors: 24 from 24 nations

Medalists
gold medal	Tom Rindell	Finland
silver medal	Stephan Lange	Germany
bronze medal	Fabio Ascoli	Italy

The Europe competition at the 1982 IYRU Youth Sailing World Championships took place between September 1 and 10.

== Results ==
Pos	Name	Country	Race 1	Race 2	Race 3	Race 3	Race 4	Race 5	Tot	Net
1	Tom Rindell	Finland	(31 RET)	4	1	3	1	2	42	11
2	Stephan Lange	Germany	2	1	(11)	6	3	1	24	13
3	Fabio Ascoli	Italy	1	6	(9)	1	6	4	27	18
4	J. Loriot	France	3	(31 DSQ)	2	8	4	3	51	20
5	John Irvine	New Zealand	13	3	3	(16)	2	7	44	28
6	W. Ghijs	Belgium	4	(31 DSQ)	18	4	5	6	68	37
7	Armando Ortolano	Greece	5	8	10	9	(31 RET)	5	68	37
8	M. Melsen	Denmark	6	7	6	(12)	8	10	49	37
9	J. Thordid	Denmark	11	5	13	19	9	(31 RET)	88	57
10	Simon Cole	United Kingdom	(18)	9	7	18	10	12	74	56
11	Gordon Anderson	Canada	12	12	4	(22)	13	18	81	59
12	Pedro-Juan Gala Izquierdo	Spain	9	(31 DSQ)	20	2	7	31 OCS	100	69
13	G. Andersen	Norway	10	2	(31 DSQ)	10	17	31 OCS	101	70
14	Mark Lyttle	Ireland	19	10	5	13	19	(20)	86	66
15	M. Keesman	Netherlands	(21)	16	14	11	18	8	88	67
16	V. Tidy	Australia	14	11	(19)	17	16	9	86	67
17	M. Stowell	Zimbabwe	8	15	15	(31 DSQ)	14	17	100	69
18	J. Santos Madeira	Portugal	16	14	(23)	5	15	21	94	71
19	Michael Luschan	Austria	7	(31 RET)	21	7	21	15	102	71
20	L. Munier	Switzerland	(20)	18	12	20	11	13	94	74
21	V. Kirby	United States	17	13	8	21	(22)	19	100	78
22	A. Kustic	Yugoslavia	15	19	16	15	(31 RET)	14	110	79
23	L. Morgan	Hong Kong	(31 DSQ)	20	22	14	12	16	115	84
24	Eric Mergenthaler	Mexico	22	17	17	(31 RET)	20	11	118	87
