= Sailing at the 2006 Asian Games – Men's 470 =

Men's 470 at the 2006 Asian Games
- Venue: Doha Sailing Club
- Date: 5–13 December 2006
- Competitors: 16 from 8 nations

Medalists
| gold medal | Kim Dae-young; Jung Sung-ahn | South Korea |
| silver medal | Xu Yuan Zhen; Terence Koh | Singapore |
| bronze medal | Kan Yamada; Kenichi Nakamura | Japan |

The men's 470 competition at the 2006 Asian Games in Doha was held from 5 to 13 December 2006.

== Schedule ==
All times are Arabia Standard Time (UTC+03:00)

| Date | Time | Event |
|---|---|---|
| Tuesday, 5 December 2006 | 11:00 | Race 1 |
| Wednesday, 6 December 2006 | 11:00 | Race 2 |
| Thursday, 7 December 2006 | 11:00 | Race 3 |
| Thursday, 7 December 2006 | 11:00 | Race 4 |
| Thursday, 7 December 2006 | 11:00 | Race 5 |
| Friday, 8 December 2006 | 11:00 | Race 6 |
| Friday, 8 December 2006 | 11:00 | Race 7 |
| Friday, 8 December 2006 | 11:00 | Race 8 |
| Sunday, 10 December 2006 | 11:00 | Race 9 |
| Sunday, 10 December 2006 | 11:00 | Race 10 |
| Monday, 11 December 2006 | 11:00 | Race 11 |
| Wednesday, 13 December 2006 | 11:00 | Race 12 |

== Results ==
Legend

- DNE — Non-excludable disqualification
- DSQ — Disqualification
- OCS — On course side

| Rank | Team | Race | | | | | | | | | | | | Total |
| Rank | Team | 1 | 2 | 3 | 4 | 5 | 6 | 7 | 8 | 9 | 10 | 11 | 12 | Total |
|---|---|---|---|---|---|---|---|---|---|---|---|---|---|---|
| 1st place, gold medalist(s) | South Korea (KOR); Kim Dae-young; Jung Sung-ahn | 4 | 1 | 2 | 1 | 4 | 2 | 1 | ~~(9)~~; DSQ | 2 | 1 | 1 | 1 | 20 |
| 2nd place, silver medalist(s) | Singapore (SIN); Xu Yuan Zhen; Terence Koh | 1 | 3 | 1 | 2 | 5 | 1 | 3 | 7 | 1 | 5 | 9 DNE | ~~(7)~~ | 38 |
| 3rd place, bronze medalist(s) | Japan (JPN); Kan Yamada; Kenichi Nakamura | 2 | 2 | ~~(7)~~ | 6 | 3 | 6 | 4 | 3 | 4 | 2 | 2 | 6 | 40 |
| 4 | Philippines (PHI); Ridgely Balladares; Rommel Chavez | 3 | 6 | 3 | 4 | ~~(7)~~ | 3 | 5 | 2 | 5 | 4 | 4 | 2 | 41 |
| 5 | India (IND); Farokh Tarapore; Vikas Kapila | 5 | ~~(7)~~ | 5 | 3 | 1 | 4 | 2 | 6 | 3 | 6 | 6 | 3 | 44 |
| 6 | China (CHN); Wang Weidong; Deng Daokun | 7 | 5 | ~~(8)~~ | 8 | 2 | 5 | 6 | 1 | 6 | 3 | 5 | 5 | 53 |
| 7 | Myanmar (MYA); Aung Myin Thu; Sai Pyae Sone Hein | 6 | ~~(8)~~ | 4 | 5 | 6 | 7 | 7 | 5 | 7 | 7 | 7 | 4 | 65 |
| 8 | Pakistan (PAK); Xerxes Byram Avari; Mehboob Rafiq | 8 | 4 | 6 | 7 | 8 | 8 | 8 | 4 | 8 | ~~(9)~~; OCS | 3 | 8 | 72 |
