= Sailing at the 2012 Summer Olympics – Men's 470 =

Men's 470 at the Games of the XXX Olympiad
- Line drawing of the 470
- Venue: Weymouth and Portland National Sailing Academy
- Dates: 2–9 August
- Competitors: 54 from 27 nations
- Teams: 27 (boats)

Medalists
1st place, gold medalist(s)		Mathew Belcher; Malcolm Page	Australia
2nd place, silver medalist(s)		Luke Patience; Stuart Bithell	Great Britain
3rd place, bronze medalist(s)		Lucas Calabrese; Juan de la Fuente	Argentina

The men's 470 was a sailing event on the Sailing at the 2012 Summer Olympics program in Weymouth and Portland National Sailing Academy, in the 470 dinghy Eleven races (last one a medal race) were scheduled and completed. 54 sailors, on 27 boats, from 27 nations competed. Crews of ten boats qualified for the medal race on course area Nothe in front of Weymouth, where each position scored double points.

== Schedule ==
●	Practice race	●	Race on Portland	●	Race on Nothe	●	Race on West	●	Race on South	●	Medal race on Nothe

Date	July						August												
Date	26 Thu	27 Fri	28 Sat	29 Sun	30 Mon	31 Tue	1 Wed	2 Thu		3 Fri	4 Sat	5 Sun	6 Mon	7 Tue	8 Wed	9 Thu	10 Fri	11 Sat	12 Sun
Men's 470							●	1	1	2	2	Spare day	2	2	Spare day	MR			

== Course areas and course configurations ==
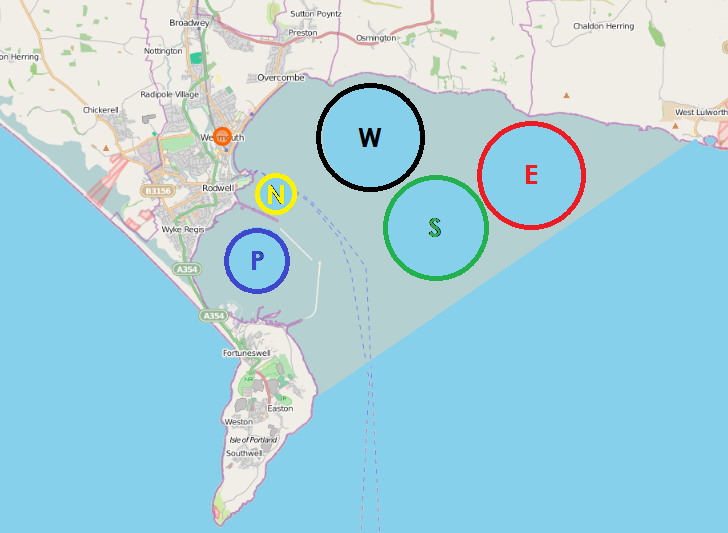
Course areas: Portland (P) Nothe (N) West (W) / South (S) East (E)

For the 470 course areas Portland, Nothe, West, and South were used. The location (50° 35.19’ N, 02° 26.54’ W) points to the center Portland course area, the location (50° 36.18’ N 02° 25.98’ W) points to the center of the Nothe course area, the location (50° 37.18’ N 02° 23.55’ W) points to the center of the West course area and the location (50° 35.71’ N 02° 22.08’ W) points to the center of the South course area. The target time for the course was 60 minutes for the races and 30 minutes for the medal race. The race management could choose from many course configurations.

== Results ==
Results of individual races
Pos	Helmsman	Country	I	II	III	IV	V	VI	VII	VIII	IX	X	MR	Tot	Pts
Gold medal	Mathew Belcher; Malcolm Page	Australia	3	9^{†}	2	1	1	1	3	5	1	1	4	31.0	22.0
Silver medal	Luke Patience; Stuart Bithell	Great Britain	2	1	4	2	3	4	1	6^{†}	3	2	8	36.0	30.0
Bronze medal	Lucas Calabrese; Juan de la Fuente	Argentina	5	24^{†}	3	9	17	8	2	2	5	6	6	87.0	63.0
4	Gabrio Zandonà; Pietro Zucchetti	Italy	6	26^{†}	1	8	6	13	8	4	11	3	12	98.0	72.0
5	Paul Snow-Hansen; Jason Saunders	New Zealand	DSQ 28^{†}	3	5	4	16	3	7	9	13	12	14	114.0	86.0
6	Šime Fantela; Igor Marenić	Croatia	DSQ 28^{†}	13	9	10	8	5	15	1	2	22	2	115.0	87.0
7	Pierre Leboucher; Vincent Garos	France	9	10	11	6	10	2	19^{†}	11	4	11	16	109.0	90.0
8	Álvaro Marinho; Miguel Nunes	Portugal	12	2	16	5	11	7	17	3	10	OCS 28^{†}	10	121.0	93.0
9	Matthias Schmid; Florian Reichstädter	Austria	1	4	7	19	4	16	24^{†}	10	14	14	18	131.0	107.0
10	Anton Dahlberg; Sebastian Östling	Sweden	4	6	8	14	13	9	14	24^{†}	22	13	20	147.0	123.0
11	Onán Barreiros; Aarón Sarmiento	Spain	7	8	12	27^{†}	24	6	10	13	15	9		131.0	104.0
12	Sven Coster; Kalle Coster	Netherlands	8	5	19	7	21	24^{†}	9	22	6	8		129.0	105.0
13	Ferdinand Gerz; Patrick Follmann	Germany	13	17^{†}	13	16	9	10	11	14	9	10		122.0	105.0
14	Stuart McNay; Graham Biehl	United States	15	22	10	3	23^{†}	23	6	18	7	4		131.0	108.0
15	Gideon Kliger; Eran Sela	Israel	17	11	17	11	2	14	5	12	OCS 28^{†}	23		140.0	112.0
16	Yannick Brauchli; Romuald Hausser	Switzerland	11	16	18	22	14	12	12	7	23^{†}	7		142.0	119.0
17	Mikhail Sheremetyev; Maxim Sheremetyev	Russia	21	18	14	13	5	20	4	25^{†}	18	17		155.0	130.0
18	Ryunosuke Harada; Yugo Yoshida	Japan	19	12	25^{†}	12	7	11	21	17	17	15		156.0	131.0
19	Panagiotis Kampouridis; Efstathios Papadopoulos	Greece	14	7	20	15	18	DSQ 28^{†}	27	19	8	20		176.0	148.0
20	Wang Weidong; Deng Daokun	China	20	15	6	26	27^{†}	17	22	26	12	16		187.0	160.0
21	Joonas Lindgren; Niklas Lindgren	Finland	22	19	22	17	12	15	26^{†}	21	21	18		193.0	167.0
22	Park Gun-woo; Cho Sung-min	South Korea	23	14	15	24	20	25^{†}	20	8	24	21		194.0	169.0
23	Ger Owens; Scott Flanigan	Ireland	16	25	24	25	15	22	25	27^{†}	16	5		200.0	173.0
24	Deniz Çınar; Ateş Çınar	Turkey	10	23	26^{†}	18	22	21	23	16	19	26		204.0	178.0
25	Luke Ramsay; Mike Leigh	Canada	24	20	21	21	19	19	16	20	26^{†}	19		205.0	179.0
26	Asenathi Jim; Roger Hudson	South Africa	18	27^{†}	27	20	26	26	13	15	25	24		221.0	194.0
27	Benjamín Grez; Diego González	Chile	25^{†}	21	23	23	25	18	18	23	20	25		221.0	196.0

Scoring system: low-point system; Source:
Legend: – Qualified for medal race(s); DSQ – Disqualified; OCS – On the course side of the starting line; † – Discarded race not counted in the overall result;

== Daily standings ==
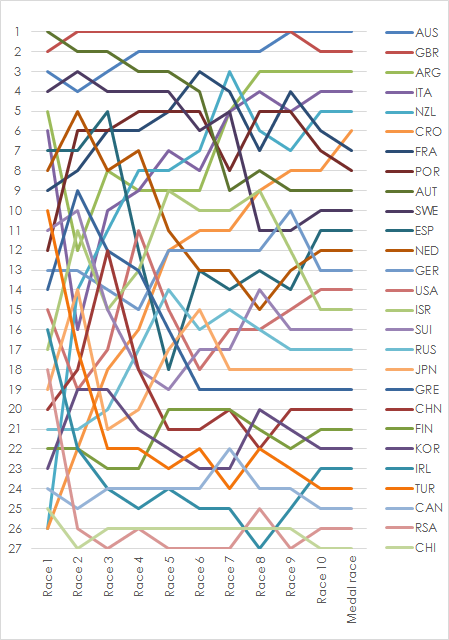
Graph showing the daily standings in the Men's 470 during the 2012 Summer Olympics
