= McIlquham =

McIlquham is a surname. Notable people with the surname include:

- Gord McIlquham (born 1961), Canadian sailor
- Harriet McIlquham (1837–1910), English suffragist
- Mary McIlquham (1901–?), English tennis player
