= Yugo Yoshida =

Japanese sailor

Personal information
- Nickname: Weed
- Nationality: Japan
- Born: 11 November 1983 (age 43) Karatsu, Saga, Japan
- Height: 1.81 m (5 ft 11 in)
- Weight: 72 kg (159 lb)

Sailing career
- Sport: Sailing
- Club: ABeam Consulting
- Coached by: Kazunori Komatsu
- Class: Dinghy
Medal record
Men's sailing
Representing Japan
Asian Games
Gold medal – first place	2010 Guangzhou	470

Yugo Yoshida (吉田 雄悟, Yoshida Yugo; born 11 November 1983 in Karatsu, Saga) is a Japanese sailor, who specializes in the two-person dinghy (470) class. He shared gold medals with his partner Ryunosuke Harada in the 470 class at the 2010 Asian Games, and later represented Japan at the 2012 Summer Olympics. Throughout most of his sailing career, Yoshida trained for the ABeam Consulting Team under his personal coach and mentor Kazunori Komatsu. As of September 2013, Yoshida is ranked no. 190 in the world for two-person dinghy class by the International Sailing Federation.

Yoshida and his partner and skipper Ryunosuke Harada made their official debut at the 2010 Asian Games in Guangzhou, China, where they edged out the host nation's Wang Weidong and Deng Daokun by a seven-point advantage for the gold medal in the men's 470 class, accumulating a net score of 17 points.

At the 2012 Summer Olympics in London, Yoshida competed again as a crew member in the men's 470 class by finishing sixth and receiving a berth from the World Championships in Barcelona, Spain. Teaming with Harada in the opening series, Yoshida mounted a spirited challenge on the fifth leg to deliver the Japanese duo a seventh spot, but fell short of the medal race with an eighteenth-place finish on 131 net points.

On February 14, 2013, Yoshida was married to his counterpart, fellow 470 sailing star, and teammate Ai Kondo at a private ceremony in Waikiki Beach, Hawaii, United States.
