= 2016 Cadet World Championship =

International sailing regatta

The 2016 Cadet World Championship were held in San Isidro Buenos Aires, Argentina between 26 December 2016 and 4 January 2017.

== Podium ==
Games	Gold	Silver	Bronze
Cadet World Championship	Jamie Harris (GBR); Antonia Wilkinson (GBR)	Santiago Plantie (ARG); Matias Finsterbusch (ARG)	Mateo Ronchi (ARG); Valentino Lancon (ARG)
