= 1982 IYRU Youth Sailing World Championships =

1982 ISAF Youth Sailing World Championships
Event title
- Edition: 12th

Event details
- Venue: Livorno, Italy
- Dates: 1 - 10 September 1982

The 1982 IYRU Youth Sailing World Championships took place in Lake Como, Italy between 1 and 10 September 1982. It was the 12th edition of the IYRU Youth Sailing World Championships.

== Competition format ==
=== Events and equipment ===
Event	Equipment
Open dinghy (single hander)	Europe
Open dinghy (double hander)	420

== Summary ==
=== Medal table ===
* Host nation (Italy)

Rank	Nation	Gold	Silver	Bronze	Total
1	Finland	1	0	0	1
1	Spain	1	0	0	1
3	Germany	0	1	1	2
4	Australia	0	1	0	1
5	Italy	0	0	1	1
Totals (5 entries)		2	2	2	6

=== Event medalists ===
==== Open events ====
Event	First	Second	Third
Europe	Tom Rindell; Finland	Stephan Lang; Germany	Fabio Ascoli; Italy
420	Fernando León Boissier; Nunez; Spain	Dennis Jones; Anthony Dean; Australia	Georg Hecht; Zander; Germany

=== Europe Youth Open ===
Pos.	Sail No.		Nats	Total points	Net points	Race 1		Race 2		Race 3		Race 4		Race 5		Race 6	
Pos.	Sail No.		Nats	Total points	Net points	Place	Points	Place	Points	Place	Points	Place	Points	Place	Points	Place	Points
1	L 11	Tom Rindell	Finland	47.7	16.7	(RET)	31	4	8	1	0	3	5.7	1	0	2	3
2	G 24	Stephan Lange	Germany	37.4	20.4	2	3	1	0	(11)	17	6	11.7	3	5.7	1	0
3	I 18	Fabio Ascoli	Italy	46.4	31.4	1	0	6	11.7	(9)	15	1	0	6	11.7	4	8
4	F 8	J Loriot	France	67.4	36.4	3	5.7	(DSQ)	31	2	3	8	14	4	8	3	5.7
5	KZ 15	John Irvine	New Zealand	68.4	46.4	13	19	3	5.7	3	5.7	(16)	22	2	3	7	13
6	B 16	W Ghijs	Belgium	92.7	61.7	4	8	(DSQ)	31	18	24	4	8	5	10	6	11.7
7	GR 12	Armandos Ortoland	Greece	96	65	5	10	8	14	10	16	9	15	RET	31	5	10
8	D 7	M Melsen	Denmark	84.4	66.4	6	11.7	7	13	6	11.7	(12)	18	8	14	10	16
9	S 19	J Thordid	Sweden	117	86	11	17	5	10	13	19	19	25	9	15	DNS	31
10	K 22	Simon Cole	United Kingdom	110	86	(18)	24	9	15	7	13	18	24	10	16	12	18
11	KC 23	Gordon Anderson	Canada	115	87	12	18	12	18	4	8	(22)	28	13	19	18	24
12	E 10	Pedro-Jan Gala Izquierdo	Spain	119	88	9	15	(DSQ)	31	20	26	2	3	7	13	OCS	31
13	N 21	G Andersen	Norway	120	89	10	16	2	3	(DSQ)	31	10	16	17	23	OCS	31
14	IR 17	Mark Lyttle	Ireland	121	95	19	25	10	16	5	10	13	19	19	25	(20)	26
15	H 4	M Keesman	Netherlands	124	97	(21)	27	16	22	14	20	11	17	18	24	8	14
16	KA 13	V Tidy	Australia	122	97	14	20	11	17	(19)	25	17	23	16	22	9	15
17	ZB 20	M Stowell	Zimbabwe	130	99	8	14	15	21	15	21	(DSQ)	31	14	20	17	23
18	P 9	J Santos Madeira	Portugal	129	100	16	22	14	20	(23)	29	5	10	15	21	21	27
19	OE 1	Michael Luschan	Austria	132	101	7	13	(RET)	31	21	27	7	13	21	27	15	21
20	Z 14	L Munier	Switzerland	130	104	(20)	26	18	24	12	18	20	26	11	17	13	19
21	US 5	V Kirby	United States	136	108	17	23	13	19	8	14	21	27	(22)	28	19	25
22	Y 6	A Kustic	Yugoslavia	140	109	15	21	19	25	16	22	15	21	(RET)	31	14	20
23	KH 3	L Morgan	Hong Kong	145	114	(DSQ)	31	20	26	22	28	14	20	12	18	16	22
24	MX 2	Eric Mergenthaler	Mexico	148	117	22	28	17	23	17	23	(RET)	31	20	26	11	17

=== 420 Youth Open ===
Pos.	Sail No.		Nats	Total points	Net points	Race 1		Race 2		Race 3		Race 4		Race 5		Race 6	
Pos.	Sail No.		Nats	Total points	Net points	Place	Points	Place	Points	Place	Points	Place	Points	Place	Points	Place	Points
1	E	Fernando Leon: Nunez	Spain	34	21	4	8	1	0	(7)	13	7	13	1	0	1	0
2	KA	Denis Jones; Anthony Dean	Australia	54.4	33.4	2	3	3	5.7	1	0	(15)	21	7	13	6	11.7
3	GR	Hecht; Zander	Germany	64.4	40.4	10	16	2	3	3	5.7	(18)	24	3	5.7	5	10
4	S	Bjorn Bengtsson; Birgitta Bengtsson	Sweden	77	41	1	0	4	8	2	3	14	20	5	10	(20)	36
5	OE	Hofer; Paewlka	Austria	68.7	45.7	7	13	9	15	6	11.7	(17)	23	2	3	2	3
6	KZ	Greenwood; David Clark	New Zealand	69.7	51.7	6	11.7	(12)	18	12	18	1	0	4	8	8	14
7	US	Shaddan; Goyan	United States	75.4	56.4	5	10	(13)	19	8	14	9	15	6	11.7	3	5.7
8	F	Le Troquer; Hay	France	81	60	12	18	5	10	10	16	4	8	(15)	21	4	8
9	Z	Seger; Zeltner	Switzerland	99	69	(DSQ)	30	8	14	14	20	2	3	13	19	7	13
10	ZB	Andrews; Doyle	Zimbabwe	106	76	9	15	10	16	(DSQ)	30	8	14	10	16	9	15
11	P	Da Silva; Maldonado	Portugal	57	79	16	-22	11	17	4	8	12	18	14	20	10	16
12	K	Jason Belben; Andrew Hemmings	United Kingdom	113.7	83.7	3	5.7	7	13	(OCS)	30	10	16	DSQ	30	13	19
13	D	P Natorp; H Natorp	Denmark	115.7	85.7	11	17	6	11.7	17	23	(DSQ)	30	11	17	11	17
14	H	Van Beek; Van De Rest	Netherlands	110.7	86.7	14	20	16	22	9	15	3	5.7	(18)	24	18	24
15	I	Andrea Mura: Ciabatti	Italy	119	89	(DSQ)	30	DSQ	30	5	10	5	10	8	14	19	25
16	IR	Theo Lyttle; Stephen Saunders	Ireland	121	91	13	19	(DSQ)	30	11	17	13	19	9	15	15	21
17	KC	H Lammens; J Lammens	Canada	120.7	96.7	(18)	24	14	20	15	21	6	11.7	16	22	16	22
18	Y	Nicolich; Marinac	Yugoslavia	132	102	8	14	(DSQ)	30	RET	30	11	17	12	18	17	23
19	KH	Ellis; Patterson	Hong Kong	145	115	19	25	(DSQ)	30	19	25	16	22	17	23	14	20
20	L	Leskinen; Backman	Finland	145	116	15	21	17	23	13	19	20	26	21	27	(23)	29
21	GR	D Pahoumas; A Pahoumas	Greece	150	120	17	23	(DSQ)	30	18	24	DSQ	30	19	25	12	18
22	B	Van Huyneghem; Saneyers	Belgium	147	120	20	26	15	21	16	22	19	25	20	26	(21)	27
23	MX	Hermann Mergenthaler: Caso	Mexico	167	137	21	27	18	24	(RET)	30	RET	30	22	28	22	28
24	14054	Marion Frantz; J.M. Frantz	Luxembourg	158	127	20	26	12	18	24	30	16	22	(25)	31	25	31
25	12566	TH. Dietz; E. Dietz	Netherlands	181	147	25	31	19	25	25	31	25	31	23	29	(28)	34
