= Sin Gwang-su =

Sin Gwang-su (also Shin Kwang-su) may refer to:

- Sin Gwang-su (poet) (1712-1775), noted poet of the late Joseon Dynasty
- Sin Gwang-su (sailor) (born 1965), South Korean Olympic sailor
- Sin Gwang-su (spy) (born 1929), North Korean operative involved in the North Korean abductions of Japanese
