= Tervo (surname) =

Tervo is a Finnish surname. Notable people with the surname include:

- Jari Tervo (born 1959), Finnish author
- Krista Tervo (born 1997), Finnish athlete
- Penna Tervo (1901–1956), Finnish politician
- Trace Tervo (born 1962), United States Virgin Islands sailor
