= Ryunosuke Harada =

Japanese sailor (born 1985)

Personal information
- Nationality: Japan
- Born: 6 May 1985 (age 41) Nagasaki, Japan
- Height: 1.71 m (5 ft 7 1/2 in)
- Weight: 58 kg (128 lb)

Sailing career
- Sport: Sailing
- Club: ABeam Consulting
- Coached by: Kazunori Komatsu
- Class: Dinghy
Medal record
Men's sailing
Representing Japan
Asian Games
Gold medal – first place	2010 Guangzhou	470

Ryunosuke Harada (原田 龍之介, Harada Ryunosuke; born May 6, 1985 in Nagasaki) is a Japanese sailor, who specialized in two-person dinghy (470) class. He shared gold medals with his partner Yugo Yoshida in the 470 class at the 2010 Asian Games, and later the pair represented Japan at the 2012 Summer Olympics. As throughout most of his sailing career, Harada currently trains for the ABeam Consulting Team under his personal coach and mentor Kazunori Komatsu. As of September 2013, Harada is ranked no. 190 in the world for two-person dinghy class by the International Sailing Federation.

Harada and his partner and crew member Yugo Yoshida made their official debut at the 2010 Asian Games in Guangzhou, China, where they edged out the host nation's Wang Weidong and Deng Daokun by seven-points for the gold medal in the men's 470 class, accumulating a net score of 17 points.

Harada qualified to compete in the men's 470 class at the 2012 Olympic Games by finishing sixth at World Championships in Barcelona, Spain. Teaming with Yoshida in the opening series, Harada skippered a spirited challenge on the fifth leg to deliver the Japanese duo a seventh spot in that leg, but they fell short of the medal race with an eighteenth-place finish on 131 net points.
