= Alkemade (surname) =

Alkemade is a surname. Notable people with the surname include:

- Guido Alkemade (born 1962), Dutch sailor
- Kimberly Alkemade (born 1990), Dutch Paralympic athlete
- Leo Alkemade (born 1980), Dutch comedian and actor
- Nicholas Alkemade (1922–1987), English Royal Air Force tail gunner
