= Peter Evans (sailor) =

New Zealand sailor (born 1961)

Peter Evans (born 1961) is a New Zealand sailor who has competed in two Olympic Games and in six America's Cup campaigns.

== Early years ==
Evans was born in 1961 and grew up in Devonport. He is a member of the Wakatere Boating Club. He started sailing Frostbites before earning several National Championships in Sabots, Starlings and Lasers. He then moved to sailing in a Europe before moving to the 470 Olympic class.

== Olympics ==
Evans, alongside Sean Reeves, sailed in a 470 at the 1984 Summer Olympics, finishing 14th. That year, they also finished third at the 470 World Championships in Auckland.

He again represented New Zealand at the 1988 Summer Olympics in the men's 470 event, this time finishing in 6th place with Simon Mander.

He later coached the sailing team for Chinese Taipei at the 1996 Summer Olympics.

== America's Cup ==
In 1990, he joined New Zealand Challenge to help with their build up for the 1992 Louis Vuitton Cup. Evans won the 1992 Match Racing World Championship.

Evans was part of Nippon Challenge during the 1995 Louis Vuitton Cup.

He joined Team New Zealand for their 2000 America's Cup defence and was in the afterguard during their unsuccessful 2003 America's Cup campaign.

Evans joined Alinghi in 2006, and he was the tactician on board their training boat during the 2007 America's Cup. During the 2010 America's Cup, Evans controlled the pre-starts on board Alinghi 5.
