= Steve Benjamin =

Steve Benjamin may refer to:

- Steve Benjamin (sailor) (born 1955), American Olympic medalist in men's sailing
- Stephen K. Benjamin (born 1969), American politician
