= Sailing at the 1988 Summer Olympics – Men's 470 =

Men's 470 at the Games of the XXIV Olympiad
- 470 dinghy
- Venue: Busan 부산 釜山
- Dates: 20–27 September
- Competitors: 58 from 29 nations
- Teams: 29

Medalists
1st place, gold medalist(s)		Thierry Péponnet; Luc Pillot	France
2nd place, silver medalist(s)		Tõnu Tõniste; Toomas Tõniste	Soviet Union
3rd place, bronze medalist(s)		John Shadden; Charles McKee	United States

The men's 470 was a sailing event on the Sailing at the 1988 Summer Olympics program in Pusan, South Korea. Seven races were scheduled. 58 sailors, on 29 boats, from 29 nations competed.

== Results ==
Rank	Helmsman (Country)	Crew	Race I		Race II		Race III		Race IV		Race V		Race VI		Race VII		Total Points	Total -1
Rank	Helmsman (Country)	Crew	Rank	Points	Rank	Points	Rank	Points	Rank	Points	Rank	Points	Rank	Points	Rank	Points	Total Points	Total -1
1st place, gold medalist(s)	Thierry Péponnet (FRA)	Luc Pillot	1	0.0	3	5.7	1	0.0	10	16.0	11	17.0	5	10.0	2	3.0	51.7	34.7
2nd place, silver medalist(s)	Tõnu Tõniste (URS)	Toomas Tõniste	11	17.0	4	8.0	12	18.0	1	0.0	1	0.0	2	3.0	RET	36.0	82.0	46.0
3rd place, bronze medalist(s)	John Shadden (USA)	Charles McKee	5	10.0	2	3.0	2	3.0	11	17.0	5	10.0	12	18.0	4	8.0	69.0	51.0
4	Fernando León (ESP)	Kiko Sánchez	4	8.0	11	17.0	4	8.0	4	8.0	PMS	36.0	1	0.0	8	14.0	91.0	55.0
5	Wolfgang Hunger (FRG)	Joachim Hunger	2	3.0	5	10.0	9	15.0	13	19.0	3	5.7	4	8.0	11	17.0	77.7	58.7
6	Peter Evans (NZL)	Simon Mander	3	5.7	8	14.0	11	17.0	18	24.0	2	3.0	7	13.0	5	10.0	86.7	62.7
7	Sandro Montefusco (ITA)	Paolo Montefusco	DSQ	36.0	1	0.0	7	13.0	9	15.0	15	21.0	8	14.0	3	5.7	104.7	68.7
8	Nigel Cochrane (CAN)	Gord McIlquham	8	14.0	10	16.0	3	5.7	2	3.0	13	19.0	11	17.0	10	16.0	90.7	71.7
9	Robert Drontmann (NED)	Mark Drontmann	6	11.7	7	13.0	15	21.0	7	13.0	RET	36.0	6	11.7	7	13.0	119.4	83.4
10	Carlos Wanderley (BRA)	Bernardo Arndt	7	13.0	9	15.0	DSQ	36.0	19	25.0	6	11.7	13	19.0	1	0.0	119.7	83.7
11	Jürgen Brietzke (GDR)	Ekkehard Schulz	18	24.0	15	21.0	5	10.0	21	27.0	4	8.0	3	5.7	12	18.0	113.7	86.7
12	Kenji Nakamura (JPN)	Masayuki Takahashi	10	16.0	12	18.0	8	14.0	12	18.0	14	20.0	9	15.0	9	15.0	116.0	96.0
13	Herman Horn Johannessen (NOR)	Karl-Einar Jensen	13	19.0	13	19.0	10	16.0	14	20.0	9	15.0	10	16.0	6	11.7	116.7	96.7
14	Jonas Häggbom (SWE)	Anders Liljeblad	12	18.0	16	22.0	16	22.0	23	29.0	10	16.0	16	22.0	14	20.0	149.0	120.0
15	Jason Belben (GBR)	Andrew Hemmings	16	22.0	14	20.0	13	19.0	20	26.0	8	14.0	19	25.0	18	24.0	150.0	124.0
16	Peter von Koskull (FIN)	Johan von Koskull	RET	36.0	6	11.7	6	11.7	8	14.0	PMS	36.0	14	20.0	PMS	36.0	165.4	129.4
17	Farokh Tarapore (IND)	Kelly Subbanand Rao	19	25.0	20	26.0	19	25.0	6	11.7	RET	36.0	20	26.0	15	21.0	170.7	134.7
18	Dan Torten (ISR)	Ram-Jacob Torten	9	15.0	RET	36.0	14	20.0	3	5.7	YMP	22.5	DNC	36.0	DNC	36.0	171.2	135.2
19	Carlos Irigoyen (ARG)	Guillermo Parada	17	23.0	21	27.0	23	29.0	22	28.0	16	22.0	15	21.0	13	19.0	169.0	140.0
20	Jodok Wicki (SUI)	Andreas Frey	PMS	36.0	YMP	36.0	17	23.0	17	23.0	7	0.6	17	23.0	RET	36.0	177.6	141.6
21	Hans Natorp (DEN)	Paul Natorp	14	20.0	18	24.0	22	28.0	PMS	36.0	18	24.0	18	24.0	17	23.0	179.0	143.0
22	Gunnlaugur Jónasson (ISL)	Ísleifur Friðriksson	21	27.0	17	23.0	20	26.0	15	21.0	DNF	36.0	21	27.0	16	22.0	182.0	146.0
23	Gyula Nyári (HUN)	Zsolt Nyári	DSQ	36.0	23	29.0	24	30.0	5	10.0	12	18.0	22	28.0	RET	36.0	187.0	151.0
24	Christian Binder (AUT)	Heimo Hecht	15	21.0	19	25.0	18	24.0	16	22.0	17	23.0	RET	36.0	RET	36.0	187.0	151.0
25	Yang Shanfeng (CHN)	Lin Bo	20	26.0	22	28.0	21	27.0	24	30.0	PMS	36.0	24	30.0	23	29.0	206.0	170.0
26	Park Ki-chul (KOR)	Shin Kwang-soo	22	28.0	24	30.0	27	33.0	PMS	36.0	19	25.0	DSQ	36.0	19	25.0	213.0	177.0
27	Siew Shaw Her (SIN)	Joseph Chan	25	31.0	27	33.0	25	31.0	25	31.0	RET	36.0	23	29.0	21	27.0	218.0	182.0
28	Andreas Karapatakis (CYP)	Khristos Khristoforou	23	29.0	25	31.0	26	32.0	27	33.0	DNF	36.0	RET	36.0	20	26.0	223.0	187.0
29	Mamoon Sadiq (PAK)	Javed Rasool	24	30.0	26	32.0	28	34.0	26	32.0	DNC	36.0	25	31.0	22	28.0	223.0	187.0

DNF = Did Not Finish, DSQ = Disqualified, PMS = Premature Start
Crossed out results did not count for the total result.
= Male, = Female

=== Daily standings ===
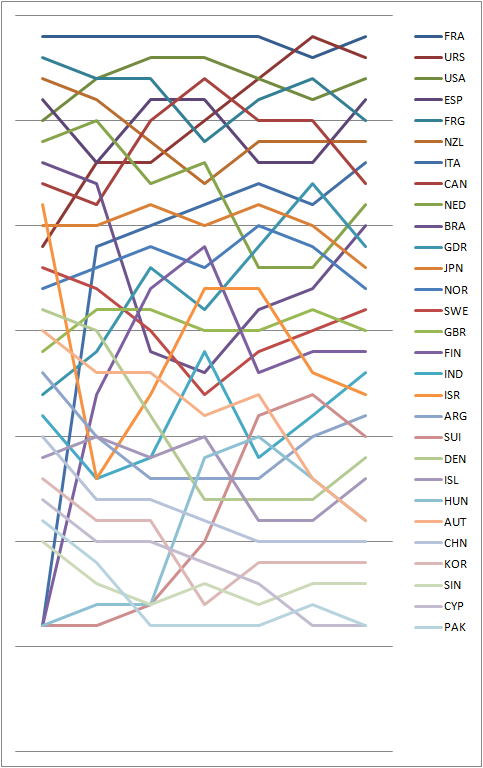
Graph showing the daily standings in the 470 during the 1988 Summer Olympics
