= Park Gun-woo =

Park Gun-woo may refer to:

- Park Gun-woo (sailor)
- Park Gun-woo (actor)
- Park Keon-woo, South Korean cyclist
