= Ranil =

Ranil may refer to

- Ranil Wickremesinghe, former President of Sri Lanka
- Ranil Jayawardena, Sri Lankan British Politician
- Ranil Abeynaike, Sri Lankan cricketer
- Ranil Dhammika, Sri Lankan cricketer
- Ranil Dias, Sri Lankan sailor
