= Ísleifur Friðriksson =

Icelandic sailor (born 1956)

Personal information
- Nationality: Icelandic
- Born: 30 July 1956 (age 69)

Sport
- Sport: Sailing

Ísleifur Friðriksson (born 30 July 1956) is an Icelandic sailor. He competed in the men's 470 event at the 1988 Summer Olympics with Gunnlaugur Jónasson where the finished 22nd.
