= Ten Hove =

ten Hove is a surname of Dutch origin.

== People with the surname ==
- Alexandra ten Hove (born 1995), Canadian sailor
- Ramón ten Hove (born 1998), Dutch professional footballer
- Tamara ten Hove, Dutch politician

== See also ==
- Martin Tenhove
