= Peter Barker (sailor) =

British Virgin Islands sailor (1955–2000)

Peter Barker (February 24, 1955 – September 14, 2000) was a sailor who competed for the British Virgin Islands. Barker with his younger brother Keith Barker competed at the 1984 Summer Olympics in Los Angeles, they entered the 470 class and out of 28 crews they finished 25th.
