= Keith Barker (sailor) =

British Virgin Islands sailor (born 1959)

Keith Barker (born February 11, 1959) is a sailor who competed for the British Virgin Islands. Barker with his older brother Peter Barker competed at the 1984 Summer Olympics in Los Angeles, they entered the 470 class and out of 28 crews they finished 25th.
