= Ferdinand Gerz =

German sailor (born 1988)

Personal information
- Nickname: Ferdi
- Nationality: Germany
- Born: 17 November 1988 (age 37) Munich, West Germany
- Height: 1.76 m (5 ft 9 in)
- Weight: 61 kg (134 lb)

Sailing career
- Sport: Sailing
- Club: Deutscher Touring Yacht Club
- Class: Dinghy

Ferdinand Gerz (born 17 November 1988) is a German sailor, who specialized in two-person dinghy (470) class. He represented Germany, along with his partner Patrick Follmann, in the men's 470 class at the 2012 Summer Olympics, and has also been training throughout most of his sporting career at Deutscher Touring Yacht Club in Tutzing.

== Career ==
Gerz was born in Munich.

Gerz qualified as a crew member for the German squad in the men's 470 class at the 2012 Summer Olympics in London by placing fifteenth and receiving a berth from the ISAF World Championships in Perth, Western Australia. Teaming with skipper Patrick Follmann in the opening series, the German duo recorded a score of 105 net points to establish a 13th-place finish in a fleet of 27 boats.

He also obtained a career best result with a single victory for the German squad at the 2012 Kiel Week regatta in Kiel. As of September 2014, Gerz is ranked no. 13 in the world for two-person dinghy class by the International Sailing Federation. Coming from a sporting pedigree, Gerz is the son of legendary sailor and 1983 world champion Wolfgang Gerz, who finished 5th under the former West German sailing team in the Finn class at the 1984 Summer Olympics in Los Angeles.
