= Sailing at the 2014 Asian Games – Match racing =

Open match racing at the 2014 Asian Games
- Venue: Wangsan Marina
- Date: 27 September – 1 October 2014
- Competitors: 40 from 9 nations

Medalists
| gold medal | Singapore; Maximilian Soh, Justin Wong, Andrew Paul Chan, Russell Kan, Christopher Lim |
| silver medal | South Korea; Park Gun-woo, Cho Sung-min, Kim Sung-wok, Yang Ho-yeob, Chae Bong-jin |
| bronze medal | Japan; Wataru Sakamoto, Daichi Wada, Nobuyuki Imai, Yasuhiro Okamoto |

The open J/80 competition at the 2014 Asian Games in Incheon was held from 27 September to 1 October 2014. The competition was match race format. It consisted of a round-robin a semi-finals and final series. The top four crews from the round-robin were seeded into the semifinal.

== Schedule ==
All times are China Standard Time (UTC+08:00)

| Date | Time | Event |
|---|---|---|
| Saturday, 27 September 2014 | 10:30 | Round robin |
| Sunday, 28 September 2014 | 10:30 | Round robin |
| Monday, 29 September 2014 | 10:30 | Round robin |
| Tuesday, 30 September 2014 | 10:00 | Round robin |
| Wednesday, 1 October 2014 | 09:30 | Semifinals |
| Wednesday, 1 October 2014 | 09:30 | Finals |

== Squads ==
| Bahrain | China | Chinese Taipei | Hong Kong |
|---|---|---|---|
| Ebrahim Abdulla Sadeq; Ebrahim Duaij Al-Doseri; Ahmed Al-Naar; Abdulrahim Abdulla Sadeq | Xu Xiaomei; Gao Haiyan; Huang Lizhu; Liu Wuwei; Lü Dongwu | Chung Chia-jung; Liu Ji-jeng; Chung Jia-wenn; Lee Chieh | Lui Kam; Yeung Chun Cheong; Tong Ping Shun; Law Yat Fung; Owen Wong |
| India | Japan | Malaysia | Singapore |
| Ayaz Ahmed Shaikh; Nijeesh Bhaskar; Sandip Jain; P. V. Santhosh | Wataru Sakamoto; Daichi Wada; Nobuyuki Imai; Yasuhiro Okamoto | Jeremy Koo; Looi Sing Yew; Fauzi Mustafa; Sean Ong | Maximilian Soh; Justin Wong; Andrew Paul Chan; Russell Kan; Christopher Lim |
| South Korea | | | |
| Park Gun-woo; Cho Sung-min; Kim Sung-wok; Yang Ho-yeob; Chae Bong-jin | | | |

== Results ==
=== Round robin ===
| Pos | Team | Pld | W | L | Pts | SIN | JPN | KOR | MAS | BRN | IND | CHN | HKG | TPE |
|---|---|---|---|---|---|---|---|---|---|---|---|---|---|---|
| 1 | Singapore | 16 | 15 | 1 | 15 | — | W W | W L | W W | W W | W W | W W | W W | W W |
| 2 | Japan | 16 | 12 | 4 | 12 | L L | — | W W | W L | W W | W W | W W | L W | W W |
| 3 | South Korea | 16 | 11 | 5 | 11 | L W | L L | — | L W | W W | W L | W W | W W | W W |
| 4 | Malaysia | 16 | 10 | 6 | 10 | L L | L W | W L | — | W L | W L | W W | W W | W W |
| 5 | Bahrain | 16 | 7 | 9 | 7 | L L | L L | L L | L W | — | W W | W W | W L | W L |
| 6 | India | 16 | 6 | 10 | 6 | L L | L L | L W | L W | L L | — | W L | L W | W W |
| 7 | China | 16 | 5 | 11 | 5 | L L | L L | L L | L L | L L | L W | — | W W | W W |
| 8 | Hong Kong | 16 | 5 | 11 | 5 | L L | W L | L L | L L | L W | W L | L L | — | W W |
| 9 | Chinese Taipei | 16 | 1 | 15 | 1 | L L | L L | L L | L L | L W | L L | L L | L L | — |

Source: Official results

=== Knockout round ===
Semifinals
1 | Singapore | W | W | W
4 | Malaysia | L | L | L
2 | Japan | L | W | W | L | L
3 | South Korea | W | L | L | W | W

Gold match
1 | Singapore | W | W
3 | South Korea | L | L
Bronze match
4 | Malaysia | L | L
2 | Japan | W | W
