= Chris Tillett =

Australian sailor

Personal information
- Nationality: Australian
- Born: 25 February 1954 (age 72)

Sport
- Sport: Sailing

Chris Tillett (born 25 February 1954) is an Australian sailor. He competed in the 470 event at the 1984 Summer Olympics.
