= Sailing at the 2002 Asian Games – Men's 470 =

Men's 470 at the 2002 Asian Games
- Venue: Busan Yachting Center
- Date: 3–9 October 2002
- Competitors: 16 from 8 nations

Medalists
gold medal	Jung Sung-ahn; Kim Dae-young	South Korea
silver medal	Kazuto Seki; Kenjiro Todoroki	Japan
bronze medal	Tan Wearn Haw; Chung Pei Ming	Singapore

The men's 470 competition at the 2002 Asian Games in Busan was held from 3 to 9 October 2002.

== Schedule ==
All times are Korea Standard Time (UTC+09:00)

Date	Time	Event
Thursday, 3 October 2002	11:00	Race 1
Thursday, 3 October 2002	14:00	Race 2
Friday, 4 October 2002	11:00	Race 3
Saturday, 5 October 2002	10:00	Race 4
Saturday, 5 October 2002	11:00	Race 5
Saturday, 5 October 2002	14:00	Race 6
Monday, 7 October 2002	11:00	Race 7
Monday, 7 October 2002	14:00	Race 8
Tuesday, 8 October 2002	11:00	Race 9
Tuesday, 8 October 2002	14:00	Race 10
Wednesday, 9 October 2002	11:00	Race 11

== Results ==
Legend

- DNC — Did not come to the starting area
- DNF — Did not finish
- DSQ — Disqualification
- RAF — Retired after finishing

Rank	Team	Race											Total
Rank	Team	1	2	3	4	5	6	7	8	9	10	11	Total
1st place, gold medalist(s)	South Korea (KOR); Jung Sung-ahn; Kim Dae-young	1	2	1	1	1	1	1	~~(4)~~	1	~~(9)~~; RAF	X	9
2nd place, silver medalist(s)	Japan (JPN); Kazuto Seki; Kenjiro Todoroki	2	~~(6)~~	2	3	2	~~(4)~~	2	3	2	2	X	18
3rd place, bronze medalist(s)	Singapore (SIN); Tan Wearn Haw; Chung Pei Ming	~~(4)~~	3	3	2	3	3	~~(4)~~	2	3	3	X	22
4	China (CHN); Fu Zhiqiang; Zheng Feng	3	1	5	4	~~(9)~~; DSQ	2	3	~~(6)~~	5	4	X	27
5	Philippines (PHI); Ridgely Balladares; Rommel Chavez	~~(5)~~	4	4	5	5	~~(6)~~	5	1	4	1	X	29
6	Pakistan (PAK); Xerxes Byram Avari; Kamil Aziz Khan	~~(6)~~	5	~~(6)~~	6	4	5	6	5	6	5	X	42
7	Kuwait (KUW); Mohammad Al-Hamdan; Abdulaziz Abdullah	~~(9)~~; RAF	8	~~(9)~~; DSQ	7	6	9	7	7	7	9 DNF	X	60
8	Qatar (QAT); Zayed Al-Maadeed; Ahmed Al-Kuwari	7	7	7	8	~~(9)~~; RAF	~~(9)~~; DNC	9 DNF	9 DNC	9 DNC	9 DNC	X	65
