= Anders Liljeblad =

Swedish sailor

Personal information
- Nationality: Swedish
- Born: 16 November 1959 (age 65); Tranås, Sweden

Sport
- Sport: Sailing

Anders Liljeblad (born 16 November 1959) is a Swedish sailor. He competed in the men's 470 event at the 1988 Summer Olympics.
