= Andreas Frey (sailor) =

Swiss sailor (born 1965)

Personal information
- Nationality: Swiss
- Born: 20 May 1965 (age 60)

Sport
- Sport: Sailing

Andreas Frey (born 20 May 1965) is a Swiss sailor. He competed in the men's 470 event at the 1988 Summer Olympics.
