= Patrick Follmann =

German sailor

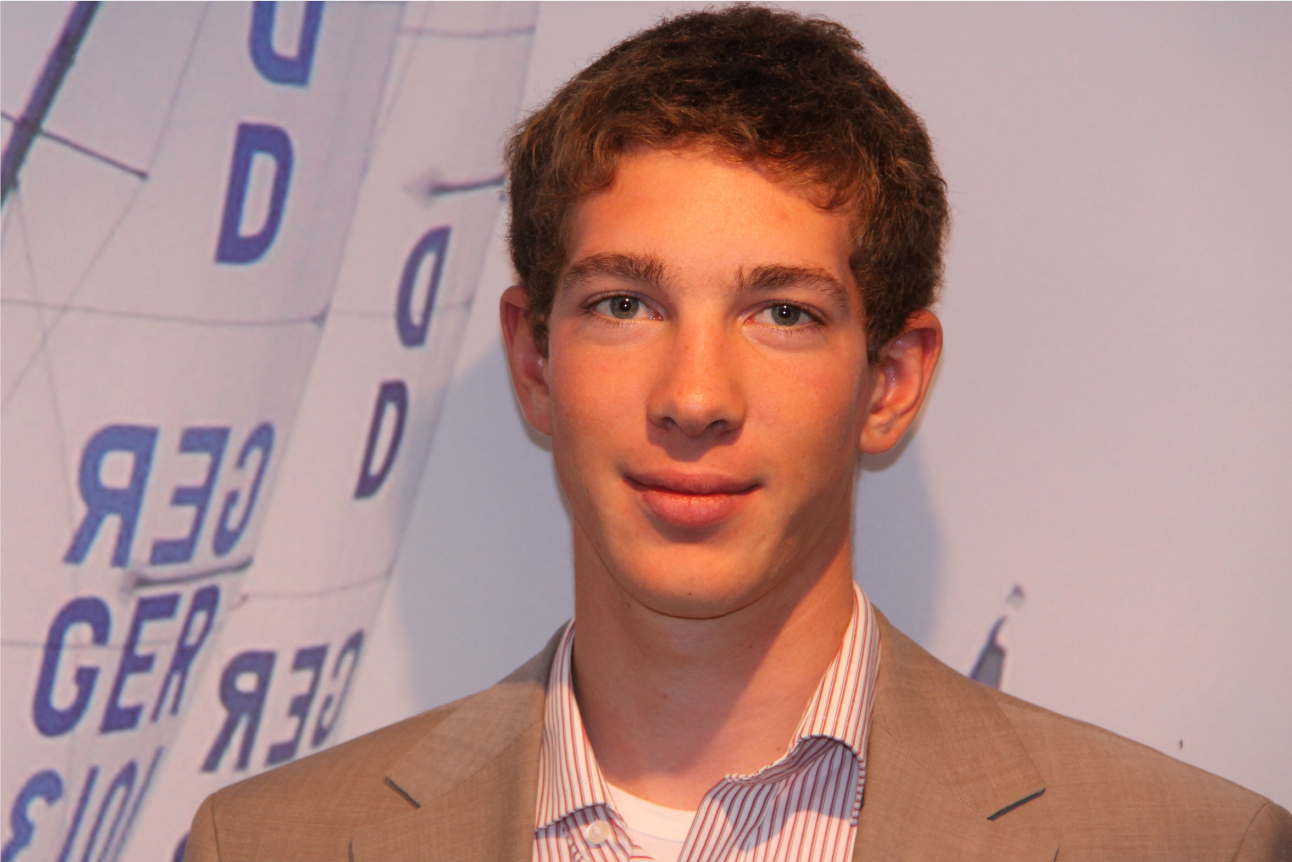
- Follmann in 2009

Personal information
- Nickname: Paddo
- Nationality: Germany
- Born: 20 April 1989 (age 37) Regensburg, West Germany
- Height: 1.93 m (6 ft 4 in)
- Weight: 74 kg (163 lb)

Sailing career
- Sport: Sailing
- Club: Deutscher Touring Yacht Club
- Class: Dinghy

Patrick Follmann (born 20 April 1989 in Regensburg) is a German sailor, who specialized in two-person dinghy (470) class. He represented Germany, along with his partner Ferdinand Gerz, at the 2012 Summer Olympics, and has also been training throughout most of his sporting career at Deutscher Touring Yacht Club in Tutzing. He also obtained a career best result with a single victory for the German squad in the men's 470 class at the 2012 Kiel Week Tournament in Kiel. As of September 2014, Follmann is ranked no. 147 in the world for two-person dinghy class by the International Sailing Federation.

Follmann qualified as a skipper for the German squad in the men's 470 class at the 2012 Summer Olympics in London by placing fifteenth at the ISAF World Championships in Perth, Western Australia. Teaming with crew member Ferdinand Gerz in the opening series, the German duo recorded a score of 105 net points to establish a thirteenth-place finish in a fleet of twenty-seven boats.
