= Rolf Nehn =

Brazilian sailor

Personal information
- Born: 21 February 1959 (age 66); Porto Alegre, Brazil

Sport
- Sport: Sailing

Rolf Nehn (born 21 February 1959) is a Brazilian sailor. He competed in the 470 event at the 1984 Summer Olympics.
