= Park Gi-cheol =

South Korean sailor (born 1961)

Personal information
- Nationality: South Korean
- Born: 3 March 1961 (age 64)
- Height: 171 cm (5 ft 7 in)
- Weight: 66 kg (146 lb)

Sport
- Sport: Sailing

Park Gi-cheol (Korean: 박기철, also known as Park Ki-chul, born 3 March 1961) is a South Korean former sailor. He competed in the men's 470 event at the 1988 Summer Olympics.
