= Chan King Yin =

Hong Kong windsurfer (born 1982)

Personal information
- Born: 13 December 1982 (age 43) Hong Kong

Chinese name
- Traditional Chinese: 陳敬然
- Simplified Chinese: 陈敬然
Transcriptions
Standard Mandarin
- Hanyu Pinyin: Chén Jìngrán
Yue: Cantonese
- Jyutping: can^{4} ging^{3} jin^{4}
Medal record
Men's sailing
Representing Hong Kong
Asian Games
Bronze medal – third place	2002 Busan	Raceboard light
Gold medal – first place	2006 Doha	Mistral light
Gold medal – first place	2010 Guangzhou	Mistral

Chan King Yin (Chinese: 陳敬然; Jyutping: can^{4} ging^{3} jin^{4}; born 13 December 1982) is a windsurfer from Hong Kong, China, who won a gold medal at the 2006 Asian Games in the mistral light class. At the 2010 Asian Games, Chan earned his second Asian Games gold medal, in the mistral event.
