= Robert Drontmann =

Dutch sailor (born 1968)

Personal information
- Full name: Robert Gerard Drontmann
- Nationality: Dutch
- Born: 1 June 1968 (age 58) The Hague, Netherlands
- Height: 1.78 m (5.8 ft)

Sailing career
- Sport: Sailing
- Class: 470
Competition record
Sailing
Representing Netherlands
Olympic Games
9th	1988 Pusan	470 Male
- Updated on 2014-01-10

Robert Gerard Drontmann (born 1 June 1968 in The Hague) is a sailor from the Netherlands, who was world champion in the Cadet class in 1985 and represented his country at the 1988 Summer Olympics in Pusan. With his older brother Mark Drontmann as crew, Drontman took the 9th place in the 470 Male.

== Professional life ==
Drontmann works since 2009 as Sales Manager & Yacht Broker at Moonen shipyard, 's-Hertogenbosch.

== Sources ==
- "Robert Drontmann Bio, Stats, and Results". Olympic Sports. Sports-Reference.com. Archived from the original on 18 April 2020.
- "De Nederlandse olympische zeilploeg". De Telegraaf (in Dutch). 10 September 1988.
- "Nederlandse zeilploeg met lege handen naar huis". De Telegraaf (in Dutch). 28 September 1988.
- Official Report, Volume 1: Organization and Planning (PDF). Seoul: Olympic Organizing Committee. 1989. Archived from the original (PDF) on 4 March 2016.
- Official Report, Volume 2: Competition, Summary and Results (PDF). Seoul: Seoul Olympic Organizing Committee. 1989. Archived from the original (PDF) on 7 October 2013.
- "Robert Drontmann". www.linkedin.com.
- "Moonen Shipyard". www.moonen.com.
