= Gonzalo Heredia (sailor) =

Argentine sailor

Personal information
- Nationality: Argentine
- Born: 23 April 1962 (age 62)

Sport
- Sport: Sailing

Gonzalo Heredia (born 23 April 1962) is an Argentine sailor. He competed in the 470 event at the 1984 Summer Olympics.
