= Lim Kui-aon =

Taiwanese sailor

Personal information
- Nationality: Taiwanese
- Born: 14 July 1956 (age 69)

Sport
- Sport: Sailing

Lim Kui-aon (born 14 July 1956) is a Taiwanese sailor. He competed in the 470 event at the 1984 Summer Olympics.
