= Luc DuBois =

Swiss sailor

Personal information
- Nationality: Swiss
- Born: 11 July 1962 (age 62)

Sport
- Sport: Sailing

Luc DuBois (born 11 July 1962) is a Swiss sailor. He competed in the 470 event at the 1984 Summer Olympics.
