= Mark Drontmann =

Dutch sailor (born 1964)

Personal information
- Full name: Mark Wilhelm Drontmann
- Nationality: Dutch
- Born: 26 March 1964 (age 62) The Hague
- Height: 1.76 m (5.8 ft)

Sailing career
- Sport: Sailing
- Class: 470
Competition record
Representing Netherlands
Olympic Games
| 9th | 1988 Pusan | 470 Male |
- Updated on 2014-01-10

Mark Wilhelm Drontmann (born 26 March 1964 in The Hague) is a sailor from the Netherlands, who represented his country at the 1988 Summer Olympics in Pusan. With his younger brother Robert Drontmann as helmsman, Drontman took the 9th place in the 470 Male.

== Professional life ==
Drontmann holds a Master’s Degree in Management and Organization at the University of Tilburg. He worked for Oce several roles, from Business unit manager up to Vice-President of the Document Printing SBU of Océ Technologies (1990–2010). He nowadays works as Commercial Director Europe for brandloyalty, 's-Hertogenbosch.

== Sources ==
- "Mark Drontmann Bio, Stats, and Results". Olympic Sports. Sports-Reference.com. Archived from the original on 2020-04-18.
- "De Nederlandse olympische zeilploeg". De Telegraaf (in Dutch). 1988-09-10.
- "Nederlandse zeilploeg met lege handen naar huis". De Telegraaf (in Dutch). 1988-09-28.
- Official Report, Volume 1: Organization and Planning (PDF). Seoul: Olympic Organizing Committee. 1989. Archived from the original (PDF) on March 4, 2016.
- Official Report, Volume 2: Competition, Summary and Results (PDF). Seoul: Seoul Olympic Organizing Committee. 1989. Archived from the original (PDF) on October 7, 2013.
- "Mark Drontmann". www.linkedin.com.
- "Brandloyalty". www.brandloyalty-int.com. Archived from the original on 2014-02-04.
