= Kim Dae-young =

South Korean sailor (born 1975)

Personal information
- Nationality: South Korean
- Born: 16 March 1975 (age 51)
- Height: 164 cm (5 ft 5 in)
- Weight: 60 kg (132 lb)

Sailing career
- Sport: Sailing
- Classes: 470, 420
Medal record
Men's sailing
Representing South Korea
Asian Games
Gold medal – first place	1998 Bangkok	420
Gold medal – first place	2002 Busan	470
Gold medal – first place	2006 Doha	470
Bronze medal – third place	2010 Guangzhou	470

Kim Dae-young (Korean: 김대영, born 16 March 1975) is a South Korean former sailor. He competed at the 1996 Summer Olympics, the 2000 Summer Olympics, and the 2004 Summer Olympics.
