= Jung Sung-ahn =

South Korean sailor (born 1971)

Personal information
- Nationality: South Korean
- Born: 26 November 1971 (age 54)
- Height: 184 cm (6 ft 0 in)
- Weight: 78 kg (172 lb)

Sailing career
- Sport: Sailing
- Classes: 470, 420
Medal record
Men's sailing
Representing South Korea
Asian Games
Gold medal – first place	1998 Bangkok	420
Gold medal – first place	2002 Busan	470
Gold medal – first place	2006 Doha	470
Bronze medal – third place	2010 Guangzhou	470

Jung Sung-ahn (Korean: 정성안, born 26 November 1971) is a South Korean former sailor. He competed at the 1992, 1996, 2000, and the 2004 Summer Olympics.
