= Carlos Wanderley =

Brazilian sailor

Personal information
- Born: 16 December 1966 (age 58); Rio de Janeiro, Brazil

Sport
- Sport: Sailing

Carlos Wanderley (born 16 December 1966) is a Brazilian sailor. He competed in the men's 470 event at the 1988 Summer Olympics.
