= 2009 Cadet World Championship =

International sailing regatta

The 2009 Cadet World Championship were held in Buenos Aires, Argentina between 1 and 10 December 2009.

== Podium ==
Games	Gold	Silver	Bronze
Cadet World Championship	Clara Cosentino (ARG); Cristobal Billoch (ARG)	Chris Brewer (GBR); Ole Alcock (GBR)	Alec Bailey (AUS); Samantha Bailey (AUS)
