= Satoru Yamamoto (sailor) =

Japanese sailor

Personal information
- Nationality: Japanese
- Born: 19 March 1963 (age 62)

Sport
- Sport: Sailing

Satoru Yamamoto (born 19 March 1963) is a Japanese sailor. He competed in the 470 event at the 1984 Summer Olympics.
