= John Stavenuiter =

Dutch sailor

Personal information
- Full name: John Stavenuiter
- Nationality: Dutch
- Born: 10 February 1956 (age 70) Haarlem
- Height: 1.76 m (5.8 ft)

Sailing career
- Sport: Sailing
- Class: 470
- Updated on 2014-01-10

John Stavenuiter (born 10 February 1956 in Haarlem) is a sailor from the Netherlands, who represented his country at the 1984 Summer Olympics in Los Angeles. With Guido Alkemade as crew, Stavenuiter took the 9th place in the 470.

== Professional life ==
Stavenuiter got a BSc in Naval engineering at the Haarlem Business School (1974–1977), a MSc in Maritime Business Engineering (1985–1989) and a PhD in Asset Management Control (1997–2002) at the Delft University of Technology. He worked as Naval engineer – Head System Management (1983–2008) and as Program Director at Asset Management Control Research Foundation (2007 – present).

== Sources ==
- "John Stavenuiter Bio, Stats, and Results". Olympic Sports. Sports-Reference.com. Archived from the original on 2013-12-19.
- "Oranje équipe met 207 personen op de Zomerspelen". Dagblad De Telegraaf (in Dutch). 1984-07-11.
- "Toppers bijeen in Hyeres Olympisch zeilexamen". Dagblad De Telegraaf (in Dutch). 1984-04-19.
- "Aspiraties". Dagblad De Telegraaf (in Dutch). 1984-04-30.
- "Verwachtingen voor Los Angeles hoog gespannen Gouden kansen voor olympische zeilptoeg". Dagblad De Telegraaf (in Dutch). 1984-07-28.
- "Zeilcoach rekent op een medaille". Dagblad De Telegraaf (in Dutch). 1984-07-31.
- "Zeilers smeken om meer wind". Dagblad De Telegraaf (in Dutch). 1984-08-03.
- "Zeilers verspelen kansen op medaille Tijdperk 'Vliegende Hollanders' voorbij". Dagblad De Telegraaf (in Dutch). 1984-08-08.
- "Surfgoud kan impuls geven Watersport wacht op frisse wind". Dagblad De Telegraaf (in Dutch). 1984-08-11.
- Official Report Los Angeles 1984, Volume 1: Organization and Planning (part 1) (PDF). Los Angeles: Los Angeles Olympic Organizing Committee. 1985. Archived from the original (PDF) on January 28, 2015.
- Official Report Los Angeles 1984, Volume 1: Organization and Planning (part 2) (PDF). Los Angeles: Los Angeles Olympic Organizing Committee. 1985. Archived from the original (PDF) on October 17, 2013.
- Official Report Los Angeles 1984, Volume 1: Organization and Planning (part 3) (PDF). Los Angeles: Los Angeles Olympic Organizing Committee. 1985. Archived from the original (PDF) on October 17, 2013.
- Official Report Los Angeles 1984, Volume 2: Competition and Summary and Results (part 1) (PDF). Los Angeles: Los Angeles Olympic Organizing Committee. 1985. Archived from the original (PDF) on October 17, 2013.
- Official Report Los Angeles 1984, Volume 2: Competition and Summary and Results (part 2) (PDF). Los Angeles: Los Angeles Olympic Organizing Committee. 1985. Archived from the original (PDF) on October 7, 2013.
- Official Report Los Angeles 1984, Volume 2: Competition and Summary and Results (part 3) (PDF). Los Angeles: Los Angeles Olympic Organizing Committee. 1985. Archived from the original (PDF) on October 17, 2013.
- "John Stavenuiter". www.linkedin.com.
- "AMCplaze". AMC.
