= Dan Torten =

Israeli sailor (born 1964)

Personal information
- Native name: דן טורטן
- Full name: Dan Noam Torten
- Nationality: Israel
- Born: September 15, 1964 (age 62) Israel
- Height: 5 ft 8 in (173 cm)
- Weight: 137 lb (62 kg)

Sailing career
- Sport: Sailing
- Class: Men's 470 Class Two-Person Dinghy

Dan Noam Torten (also "Tortan"; Hebrew: דן טורטן; September 15, 1964) is an Israeli former Olympic competitive sailor. He was born in Israel and is Jewish.

== Sailing career ==
In 1986, Torten and his brother Ran Torten came in sixth in the 470 World Championships.

He competed for Israel at the 1988 Summer Olympics in Seoul, South Korea at the age of 24 in Sailing, with his brother. In the Men's 470 Class Two-Person Dinghy they came in 18th. When he competed in the Olympics he was 5 feet 8 inches (173 cm) tall and weighed 137 pounds (62 kg).

Sailors at the Olympics are judged by the best six of their seven races. One of the brothers' races, their fifth—as they were 10th in the standings—fell on Yom Kippur (the holiest day on the Jewish calendar), and the delegation instructed them to not compete. They ignored the Israeli National Olympic Committee's instructions, sailed to a # 9 finish, were thrown off the Israeli team, and were sent back to Israel the following day. Uri Afek, the Israeli delegation head, said, "Everyone knew no Israelis compete on Yom Kippur," but the brothers said they were not racing but rather sailing for their own enjoyment. The brothers' appeals against the disciplinary committee's decision was rejected by the District and Supreme Court. They were suspended by the Israeli Sports Association for a period of five years, but the Israeli High Court overturned that decision.
