= Alejandro Terrones =

Mexican sailor (born 1951)

Personal information
- Born: 21 August 1951 (age 73); Mexico City, Mexico

Sport
- Sport: Sailing

Alejandro Terrones (born 21 August 1951) is a Mexican sailor. He competed in the 470 event at the 1984 Summer Olympics.
