= Cadet World Championship =

Annual international sailing regatta

The Cadet World Championship are international sailing regattas in the Cadet class organized by the International Sailing Federation and the International Cadet Class Association.

== International Cadet Week ==
(The Cadet champions from 1950 up to and including 1966 won the International Cadet Week, the forerunner of the World Championships).
1950 – Burnham-on-Crouch, England – D Thorpe / R Pratt (GBR)
1951 – Burnham-on-Crouch, England – R Ellis / B Ellis (GBR)
1952 – Burnham-on-Crouch, England – B W Appleton / R Vines (GBR)
1953 – Burnham-on-Crouch, England – B Ellis / R Walsh (GBR)
1954 – Burnham-on-Crouch, England – B Ellis / R Walsh (GBR)
1955 – Burnham-on-Crouch, England – B Ellis / Walsh (GBR)
1956 – Burnham-on-Crouch, England – J Prosser / P Assheton (GBR)
1957 – Burnham-on-Crouch, England – B Steel / R Steel (GBR)
1958 – Burnham-on-Crouch, England – P van Godsenhoven / R Joski (BEL)
1959 – Burnham-on-Crouch, England – J Rogge / P Rogge (BEL)
1960 – Burnham-on-Crouch, England – R Pattisson / J Pattisson (GBR)
1961 – Burnham-on-Crouch, England – P Bateman / T Jenkins (GBR)
1962 – Burnham-on-Crouch, England – S Clifford / A Harden (GBR) and Georges Wackens/Annette Verhaegen (BEL) Tied - the only occasion this has occurred
1963 – Burnham-on-Crouch, England – I Gray / I Gray (GBR)
1964 – Burnham-on-Crouch, England – M Harrison / A Tucker (GBR)
1965 – Plymouth, England – N Boult / D Long (GBR)
1966 – Plymouth, England – B Wyszkowsk / A Nowicki (POL)

== World Championships ==
Medallists
Year	Gold	Silver	Bronze
1967 Montreal	Zbigniew Kania (POL); Konrad Fick (POL)	Paul Whitehead (GBR); John Whitehead (GBR)	W. Simmons (USA); M. McDowell (USA)
1968 Gizycko	L Wrobel (POL); E Pietracha (POL)	Jan Bronicki (POL); Wojciech Nowicki (POL)	Thomas Hecht (GDR); Ekkehard Richter (GDR)
1969 La Coruña	Carl Winters (BEL); P Winters (BEL)	Michael Ellis (GBR); John Burton (GBR)	Nick Morgan (GBR); John Whitehead (GBR)
1970 Tasmania	Chris Tillet (AUS); David Tillet (AUS)	Roger Hickman (AUS); R. Street (AUS)	Carl Winters (BEL); P Winters (BEL)
1971 Whitstable	Peter Marchant (GBR); Martin McCaffrey (GBR)	Gareth Owen (GBR); Richard Bradshaw (GBR)	Martin Brown (GBR); Michael Law (GBR)
1972 Split	Gareth Owen (GBR); Richard Bradshaw (GBR)	P Winters (BEL); Patrick Van Damm (BEL)	Gregory Wrona (POL); Jerzy Ruziak (POL)
1973 Veere	Nigel Barrow (GBR); Geoffrey Grimes (GBR)	Gareth Owen (GBR); Richard Boolt (GBR)	P Winters (BEL); Benoit Goemans (BEL)
1974 Troia	Frank Bucek (AUS); Addy Bucek (AUS)	Matthew Anderson (AUS); Robert Oldmeadow (AUS)	Henryk Blaszka (POL); Slawomir Blaszka (POL)
1975 Trieste	Ian Videlo (GBR); Karen Videlo (GBR)	Howard Williams (GBR); Simon Hartley (GBR)	Robert Molnar (CZE); Milan Puchon (CZE)
1976 Mumbai Bombay	Keith Videlo (GBR); David Green (GBR)	Nick Rees (AUS); David Rees (AUS)	Faroukh Tarapore (IND); Sanjeev Rawell (IND)
1977 Monnickendam	Simon Girven (GBR); James Cons (GBR)	Martín Billoch (ARG); Guillermo Baquerizas (ARG)	Rudi Cleeren (BEL); Christian Lambrechts (BEL)
1978 Glenelg	David Rees (AUS); Grant Maddock (AUS)	Peter Iszatt (GBR); Annabel Morris (GBR)	Chris Jones (AUS); Damian Hardy (AUS)
1979 Torquay	Rod Behrens (AUS); Justin Keating (AUS)	I. Brown (GBR); P. Newman (GBR)	Santiago Lange (ARG); Miguel Saubidet (ARG)
1980 Çeşme	Carlos Castrillo (ARG); Flavio Naviera (ARG)	Gabriel Mariani (ARG); Gustavo Mariani (ARG)	Chris Trainor (GBR); Giles Sinkinson (GBR)
1981 Buenos Aires	Raul Saubidet (ARG); Julio Saubidet (ARG)	Robert Smith (GBR); Richard Sinkinson (GBR)	Carlos Castrillo (ARG); Martín Castrillo (ARG)
1982 Cartagena	Rutger Mohr (NED); Dirk Pepping (NED)	Guillermo Parada (ARG); Agustin Bracco (ARG)	Robert Drontmann (NED); Jaap de Vriend (NED)
1983 Brouwershaven	Guillermo Parada (ARG); Mariano Parada (ARG)	Robert Drontmann (NED); Jaap de Vriend (NED)	Thierry Den Hartigh (BEL); Peter Laureyssens (BEL)
1984 Lake Velence	Mariano Parada (ARG); Mathias Blanco (ARG)	Thierry Den Hartigh (BEL); Peter Laureyssens (BEL)	Robert Drontmann (NED); Jaap de Vriend (NED)
1985 Melbourne	Robert Drontmann (NED); Matthijs van Velden (NED)	Paul Burnell (AUS); Nicholas Behrens (AUS)	C. Frers (ARG); P. Tedin (ARG)
1986 Laredo	Paul Burnell (AUS); Nicholas Behrens (AUS)	Joaquin Molle (ARG); J. Bertres (ARG)	Mariano Parada (ARG); S. Merrill (AUS)
1987 Pwllheli	Paul Burnell (AUS); Rhys Menadue (AUS)	Mariano Parada (ARG)	Gerard Mitchell (GBR)
1988 Bombay	Cyrus Cama (IND); Amish Ved (IND)	Jamie Lea (GBR); Adam May (GBR)	Nikhil Ved (IND); Vikas Kapila (IND)
1989 Andijk	Antonio Otero Novoa (ESP); Ivan Perez Candaras (ESP)	Julio Magdalena (ARG); Cesar Chichizda (ARG)	Tom Bayliss (GBR); James Cameron (GBR)
1990 Puck	Jamie Lea (GBR); James Ward (GBR)	Frank Rowsell (GBR); Harry Mogridge (GBR)	James Flinterman (NED); Wynke Bodewess (NED)
1991 Buenos Aires	Pancho Paillot (ARG); Eizayaga (ARG)		
1992 Lake Balaton	Javier Conte (ARG); F Alema (ARG)		
1993 Nieuwpoort	Juan de la Fuente (ARG); Mariano de la Fuent (ARG)	Patricio Rocha (ARG)	Nicolás Fracchia (ARG); Hernán Oppo (ARG)
1994 Tasmania	Francisco "K-Jon" van Avermaete (ARG); Andrés Grimaldi (ARG)		
1995 Mallorca	Sebastian Marcone (ARG); Jonathan Izquierdo (ARG)	Rodrigo Cordero (ARG); Federico Diez (ARG)	
1996 Bombay	Alejandro Baudoino (ARG); Alejandro Smurra (ARG)	Ben Rhodes (GBR); Mark "Corky" Rhodes (GBR)	Nicolas Guille (ARG); Leandro Cimino (ARG)
1997 Torquay	Alejandro Baudoino (ARG); Alejandro Smurra (ARG)	Alejandro Primavera (ARG); Damián Marsili (ARG)	Luis Soto (ESP); Miguel Soto (ESP)
1998 Kurenpolder	Federico Alonso (ESP); Altor Esquibe (ESP)	José Diez (ARG); Damian Marsili (ARG)	Juan P. Lupo (ARG); Ayelen Gavin (ARG)
1999 Geelong	G Pollitzer (ARG); M Manrique (ARG)		Juan P. Lupo (ARG); Ayelen Gavin (ARG)
2000 Gdynia	Sam Carter (GBR); Robert Graves (GBR)	Jim Haverhals (BEL); Kyoo-lee Michielsens (BEL)	Matías Bühler (ARG); Fernando Garillo (ARG)
2001 Buenos Aires	Fernando Gwozdz (ARG); Julian De Mare (ARG)	Mariano Pellegrino (ARG); Santiago Verdino] (ARG)	Alejo Rigoni (ARG); Santiago Rigoni (ARG)
2002 Ribnitz	Mariano Pellegrino (ARG); Santiago Verdino (ARG)	Jim Haverhals (BEL); Roger De Munck (BEL)	Danill Adzintsou (BLR); Allaksandr Trayan (BLR)
2003 Nieuwpoort	Maria Agustina Torre (ARG); Rosario Torre (ARG)	James Wade (GBR)	
2004 Adelaide	Manuel Bologna (ARG); Rosario Torre (ARG)		
2005 Sanxenxo	James Rusden (GBR); Erin Clark (GBR)	Stephen Videlo (GBR); Aaron Woolf (GBR)	Victoria Travascio (ARG); Maria Eugenia (ARG)
2006 Lake Balaton (HUN)	Francisco Cosentino (ARG); Sancho Castro (ARG)	Hamish Stone (GBR); Aaron Woolf (GBR)	Gonsala Cosentino (ARG); Lucas Cabrai (ARG)
2007 Pwllheli (GBR)	Francisco Cosentino (ARG); Sancho Castro (ARG)	Francisco Gojenola (ARG); Agustin Romero (ARG)	Michal Tomaszewski (POL); Agata Tomaszewska (POL)
2008 Medemblik (NED)	Quinten Lauwers (BEL); Nele De Munck (BEL)	Joanna Freeman (GBR); Holly Francis (GBR)	Thomas Kennedy (AUS); Ellie Chesterman (AUS)
2009 Buenos Aires (ARG)	Clara Cosentino (ARG); Cristobal Billoch (ARG)	Chris Brewer (GBR); Ole Alcock (GBR)	Alec Bailey (AUS); Samantha Bailey (AUS)
2010; Puck (POL)	Krzysztof Malecki (POL); Mikolaj Mickiewicz (POL)	Anton Sasson (AUS); Julian Sasson (AUS)	Alec Bailey (AUS); Samantha Bailey (AUS)
2011; Kuehlungsborn	Maciej Kamiński (POL); Szymon Ostrowski (POL)	Ilya Polyschuk (RUS); Ilya Gaydaenko (RUS)	Anton Sasson (AUS); Julian Sasson (AUS)
2012; Tasmania (AUS)	Oleksandr Izarov (UKR); Andriy Kalinchuk (UKR)	Danyil Martynov (UKR); Pavlo Merezhko (UKR)	Alex Corby (GBR); Robert Keen (GBR)
2013; Nieuwpoort (BEL)	Igor Lvov (UKR); Vladislav Ymenko (UKR)	Arran Holman (GBR); Lucie Offord (GBR)	Nastassia Kryutsova (BLR); Veranika Melnichdnak (BLR)
2014; Weymouth (GBR)	Thomas Alexander (AUS); Sophie Alexander (AUS)	Igor Lvov (UKR); Maria Kulbashna (UKR)	Lucy Terkelson (GBR); Cally Terkelson (GBR)
2015; Riva (ITA)	Sam Abel (AUS); Hugo Allison (AUS)	Archie Penn (GBR); Hazel Whittle (GBR)	Yehor Samarin (UKR); Maksim Remez (UKR)
2016; Buenos Aires (ARG)	Jamie Harris (GBR); Antonia Wilkinson (GBR)	Santiago Plantie (ARG); Matias Finsterbusch (ARG)	Mateo Ronchi (ARG); Valentino Lancon (ARG)
2017; Bruinisse (NED)	Eryk Martynko (POL); Kinga Martynko (POL)	Teo Zecchin (ARG); Ana Zecchin (ARG)	Santiago Plantie (ARG); Matias Finsterbusch (ARG)
2018; Bodstedt (GER)	ARG 9723; Teo Zecchin (ARG); Ana Zecchin (ARG)	ARG 9988; Julian Finsterbusch (ARG)	GBR 9754; Charlotte Videlo (GBR); Tom Shepherd (GBR)
2019; Krynica Morska (POL)	ARG 9988; Julian Finsterbusch (ARG); Franco Barone (ARG)	BEL 10055; Thibaud Dirix (BEL); Thomas Winand (BEL)	POL 9602; Paweł Kajeta (POL); Tymoteusz Roszkowski (POL)
2020	Canceled due to COVID-19		
2021; Riva del Garda (ITA)	Matias Finsterbusch (ARG); Franco Barone (ARG)	Zuzanna Ostrowska (POL); Alicja Labanowska (POL)	Krystian Krysiak (POL); Zofia Sienkiewicz (POL)
2022; Williamstown (AUS)	Toby Bush (GBR); Kemmel Thorogood (GBR)	Will Shepherd (GBR); Annabel Shepherd (GBR)	Luca Groves (AUS); Adela Thomas (AUS)
2023; Nieuwpoort (BEL)	Tomas Fernandez Jardon (ARG); Vicente Carloni Bohl (ARG)	Franciszek Massalski (POL); Wojciech Szarynski (POL)	Evie McDonald (AUS); Jack Jones (AUS)
2024; Plymouth (GBR)	Josh Garner (AUS); Jack Benyan (AUS)	Uliana Postrelko (UKR); David Gutiiev (UKR)	Sam Hooper (AUS); Thomas Pitt (AUS)
2025	Uliana Postrelko (UKR); Katerina Butenko (UKR)	Alexander Enkel (GBR); Jude Baldock (GBR)	Jack Benyan (AUS); Louis Davis (AUS)
