= Ran Torten =

Israeli sailor

Personal information
- Native name: רן טורטן
- Full name: Ran Jacob Torten
- Nationality: Israel
- Born: December 14, 1966 (age 59) Israel
- Height: 5 ft 11.5 in (182 cm)
- Weight: 154 lb (70 kg)

Sport

Sailing career
- Class: Men's 470 Class Two-Person Dinghy

Ran Jacob Torten (also "Ram" and "Ron," and "Tortan"; Hebrew: רן טורטן; December 14, 1966) is an Israeli former Olympic competitive sailor. He was born in Israel, and is Jewish.

== Sailing career ==
In 1986, Torten and his brother Dan Torten came in sixth in the 470 World Championships.

He competed for Israel at the 1988 Summer Olympics in Seoul, South Korea at the age of 24 in Sailing, with his brother. In the Men's 470 Class Two-Person Dinghy they came in 18th. When he competed in the Olympics he was 5 ft 11.5 in (182 cm) tall and weighed 154 lb (70 kg).

Sailors at the Olympics are judged by the best six of their seven races. One of the brothers' races, their fifth—as they were 10th in the standings—fell on Yom Kippur (the holiest day on the Jewish calendar), and the delegation instructed them to not compete. They ignored the Israeli National Olympic Committee's instructions, sailed to a # 9 finish, were thrown off the Israeli team, and were sent back to Israel the following day. Uri Afek, the Israeli delegation head, said, "Everyone knew no Israelis compete on Yom Kippur," but the brothers said they were not racing but rather sailing for their own enjoyment. The brothers' appeals against the disciplinary committee's decision was rejected by the District and Supreme Court. They were suspended by the Israeli Sports Association for a period of five years, but the Israeli High Court overturned that decision.
