= Ai Yoshida =

Japanese sailor (born 1980)

Personal information
- Full name: Ai Kondo Yoshida
- Nationality: Japanese
- Born: Ai Kondo; 5 November 1980 (age 46) Hachiōji, Japan
- Spouse: Yugo Yoshida

Sailing career
- Sport: Sailing
- Class: 470
Medal record
Women's sailing
Representing Japan
World Championships
Gold medal – first place	2018 Aarhus	Women's 470
Silver medal – second place	2006 Rizhao	Women's 470
Silver medal – second place	2019 Enoshima	Women's 470
Gold medal – first place	2025 Enoshima	Women's Snipe
Asian Games
Gold medal – first place	2006 Doha	Women's 470
Gold medal – first place	2010 Guangzhou	Women's 470
Gold medal – first place	2018 Jakarta-Palembang	Women's 470
- Updated on March 2021

Ai Kondo Yoshida (吉田(近藤) 愛, Yoshida (Kondō) Ai; born 5 November 1980) is a Japanese sports sailor.

At the 2008 Summer Olympics, she competed in the women's 470 class with Naoko Kamata, finishing in 14th place. At the 2012 Summer Olympics, she competed in the same event, finishing in 14th place again, with her teammate this time being Wakako Tabata. At the 2016 Summer Olympics, she competed in the same event with Miho Yoshioka, finishing in 5th place. At the 2020 Summer Olympics, she competed in the same event with Miho Yoshioka, finishing in 7th place.

For the 2006 Women's 470 World Championships, Yoshida teamed up with Naoko Kamata winning silver. For the 2018 Women's 470 World Championships, Yoshida teamed up with Miho Yoshioka winning gold. For the 2019 Women's 470 World Championships, Yoshida teamed up with Miho Yoshioka again, winning silver.

For the 2025 Female Snipe World Championship, Yoshida teamed up with Honoka Miura winning gold.
