= Khristos Khristoforou =

Cypriot sailor (born 1971)

Personal information
- Nationality: Cypriot
- Born: 1 November 1971 (age 54)

Sport
- Sport: Sailing

Khristos Khristoforou (born 1 November 1971) is a Cypriot sailor. He competed in the men's 470 event at the 1988 Summer Olympics.
