= Karl-Einar Jensen =

Norwegian sailor (born 1965)

Personal information
- Nationality: Norwegian
- Born: 16 June 1965 (age 60) Oslo, Norway

Sport
- Sport: Sailing

Karl-Einar Jensen (born 16 June 1965) is a Norwegian sailor. He competed in the men's 470 event at the 1988 Summer Olympics.
