= 1981 Cadet World Championship =

International sailing regatta

The 1981 Cadet World Championship was held in Buenos Aires, Argentina between 27 December 1981 and 2 January 1982.

== Podium ==
At the podium were the following. An Argentine team won.

| Games | Gold | Silver | Bronze |
|---|---|---|---|
| Cadet World Championship | Raul Saubidet (ARG); Julio Saubidet (ARG) | Robert Smith (GBR) Richard Sinkinson (GBR) | Carlos Castrillo (ARG); Martín Castrillo (ARG) |
