= Juan Barahona (sailor) =

Chilean sailor

Personal information
- Nationality: Chilean
- Born: 19 August 1961 (age 63)

Sport
- Sport: Sailing

Juan Barahona (born 19 August 1961) is a Chilean sailor. He competed in the 470 event at the 1984 Summer Olympics.
