= Richard Lumb (sailor) =

Australian sailor

Personal information
- Nationality: Australian
- Born: 18 November 1955 (age 69)

Sport
- Sport: Sailing

Richard Lumb (born 18 November 1955) is an Australian sailor. He competed in the 470 event at the 1984 Summer Olympics.
