= Cho Sung-min (sailor) =

South Korean sailor

Personal information
- Nationality: South Korea
- Born: 29 January 1987 (age 39) Seoul, South Korea
- Height: 1.77 m (5 ft 10 in)
- Weight: 68 kg (150 lb)

Korean name
- Hangul: 조성민
- RR: Jo Seongmin
- MR: Cho Sŏngmin

Sailing career
- Sport: Sailing
- Club: Su-Young Man Yachting Center
- Class(es): Dinghy, match race
Medal record
Men's sailing
Representing South Korea
Asian Games
Bronze medal – third place	2010 Guangzhou	Match racing
Silver medal – second place	2014 Incheon	Match racing

Cho Sung-min (Korean: 조성민; born January 29, 1987, in Seoul) is a South Korean sailor, who specialized in two-person dinghy (470) and open match racing classes. He claimed a bronze medal, as a member of the South Korean sailing team, in match racing at the 2010 Asian Games, and later represented South Korea at the 2012 Summer Olympics. As of September 2013, Cho is ranked no. 134 in the world for two-person dinghy class by the International Sailing Federation.

Cho made his official debut at the 2010 Asian Games in Guangzhou, where he captured a bronze medal for the South Korean team in a match duel against the host nation China with a scintillating record of 3–1.

At the 2012 Summer Olympics in London, Cho competed as a boat crew member in the men's 470 class after receiving a berth from the World Championships in Barcelona, Spain. Teaming with his partner and skipper Park Gun-woo in the opening series, Cho pulled off a twenty-second-place finish in a fleet of twenty-seven boats with an accumulated net score of 169 points.
