= Lin Bo =

Chinese sailor

Personal information
- Nationality: Chinese
- Born: 20 October 1962 (age 62)

Sport
- Sport: Sailing

Lin Bo (born 20 October 1962) is a Chinese sailor. He competed in the men's 470 event at the 1988 Summer Olympics.
