= Xu Xianyuan =

Chinese sailor

Personal information
- Nationality: Chinese
- Born: 9 November 1957 (age 67)

Sport
- Sport: Sailing

Xu Xianyuan (born 9 November 1957) is a Chinese sailor. He competed in the 470 event at the 1984 Summer Olympics.
