= Jón Pétursson (sailor) =

Icelandic sailor (born 1967)

Personal information
- Nationality: Icelandic
- Born: 4 May 1967 (age 58)

Sport
- Sport: Sailing

Jón Pétursson (born 4 May 1967) is an Icelandic sailor. He competed in the 470 event at the 1984 Summer Olympics.
