= Eric Zucker =

United States Virgin Islands sailor

Personal information
- Nationality: American Virgin Islander
- Born: October 4, 1963 (age 61); St. Thomas, U.S. Virgin Islands
- Height: 170 cm (5 ft 7 in)
- Weight: 67 kg (148 lb)

Sport
- Sport: Sailing

Eric Zucker (born October 4, 1963) is a sailor who represented the United States Virgin Islands. He competed in the 470 event at the 1984 Summer Olympics.
