= Heimo Hecht =

Austrian sailor (born 1961)

Personal information
- Nationality: Austrian
- Born: 25 April 1961 (age 64) Mödling, Austria

Sport
- Sport: Sailing

Heimo Hecht (born 25 April 1961) is an Austrian sailor. He competed in the men's 470 event at the 1988 Summer Olympics.
