= Dan Lovén =

Swedish sailor (1961–2019)

Personal information
- Nationality: Swedish
- Born: 26 February 1961; Gothenburg, Sweden
- Died: 26 September 2019 (aged 58)

Sport
- Sport: Sailing

Dan Lovén (26 February 1961 – 26 September 2019) was a Swedish sailor. He competed in the 470 event at the 1984 Summer Olympics.
