= Lucas Calabrese =

Argentine sailor (born 1986)

Personal information
- Born: 12 December 1986 (age 39) Olivos, Argentina
- Height: 168 cm (5 ft 6 in)
- Weight: 60 kg (132 lb)

Sailing career
- Sport: Sailing
- Class(es): 470, Optimist, J/70, 420, Etchells
Medal record
Sailing
Representing Argentina
Olympic Games
| Bronze medal – third place | 2012 London | Men's 470 |

Lucas Calabrese (born 12 December 1986 in Olivos) is an Argentine sailor. He competed in the 470 class (with Juan de la Fuente) at the 2012 Summer Olympics and won the bronze medal. He had earlier won gold and silver at the 2001 and 2000 Optimist World Championships.

He is part of the American Magic team competing in the 2024 America's Cup.
