= Zheng Kaiping =

Chinese sailor

Personal information
- Nationality: Chinese
- Born: 7 November 1961 (age 63)

Sport
- Sport: Sailing

Zheng Kaiping (born 7 November 1961) is a Chinese sailor. He competed in the 470 event at the 1984 Summer Olympics.
