= Yutaka Takagi (sailor) =

Japanese sailor (1960–2018)

Personal information
- Nationality: Japanese
- Born: 13 July 1960
- Died: 16 July 2018 (aged 58)

Sport
- Sport: Sailing

Yutaka Takagi (13 July 1960 – 16 July 2018) was a Japanese sailor. He competed in the 470 event at the 1984 Summer Olympics.
