= Lim Yal-aon =

Taiwanese sailor

Personal information
- Nationality: Taiwanese
- Born: 14 January 1955 (age 70)

Sport
- Sport: Sailing

Lim Yal-aon (born 14 January 1955) is a Taiwanese sailor. He competed in the 470 event at the 1984 Summer Olympics.
