= Terence Koh (sailor) =

Singaporean sailor (born 1987)

Personal information
- Full name: Terence Koh
- Nationality: Singapore
- Born: 24 August 1987 (age 39) Singapore
- Height: 1.80 m (5 ft 11 in)
- Weight: 68 kg (150 lb)

Sailing career
- Sport: Sailing
- Club: National Optimist Sailing Scheme
- Coached by: Craig Ferris (AUS)
- Class: Dinghy
Medal record
Men's sailing
Representing Singapore
Asian Games
Silver medal – second place	2006 Doha	470

Terence Koh (born 24 August 1987) is a Singaporean former sailor, who specialized in the two-person dinghy (470) class. Together with his partner Xu Yuan Zhen, he was named one of the country's top sailors in the double-handed dinghy for the 2008 Summer Olympics, finishing in twenty-second place. A linear regression analysis showed this to be a credible result given the accumulated experience of the Singaporean pair, who were among the youngest in the fleet. Outside his Olympic career, he and Xu gave the Singaporeans a sterling silver medal in the men's 470 at the 2006 Asian Games in Doha, Qatar. A member of the Singapore Sailing Federation, Koh trained for the Games under the tutelage of Australian-born head coach Craig Ferris. He is also the younger brother of two-time Olympian Koh Seng Leong.

Koh competed for the Singaporean sailing squad, as a crew member in the men's 470 class, at the 2008 Summer Olympics in Beijing. He and skipper Xu topped the selection criteria in a three-way battle with the quota recipients Roy Tay and Chung Peiming, and Teo Wee Chin and Benjamin Tan to lock the country's berth, based on their cumulative scores attained at three international regattas stipulated by the Singapore Sailing Federation. Stranded in the middle of a vast 29-boat fleet at the very start, the Singaporean duo held off a late charge from behind to attain a top-ten mark on the seventh leg of the series. Another wave of substantial outcomes towards the final stretch, however, diminished the Singaporeans' prospect to enter the medal round, sitting them in twenty-second overall with 159 net points.
