= Yang Shanfeng =

Chinese sailor (born 1966)

Personal information
- Nationality: Chinese
- Born: 8 January 1966 (age 60)

Sport
- Sport: Sailing

Yang Shanfeng (born 8 January 1966) is a Chinese sailor. He competed in the men's 470 event at the 1988 Summer Olympics.
