= Jonas Häggbom =

Swedish sailor (born 1960)

Personal information
- Nationality: Swedish
- Born: 29 July 1960 (age 65) Sollentuna, Sweden

Sport
- Sport: Sailing

Jonas Häggbom (born 29 July 1960) is a Swedish sailor. He competed in the men's 470 event at the 1988 Summer Olympics.
