= Paul Natorp (sailor) =

Danish sailor (born 1966)

Personal information
- Nationality: Danish
- Born: 16 August 1966 (age 59) Sønderborg, Denmark

Sport
- Sport: Sailing

Paul Natorp (born 16 August 1966) is a Danish sailor. He competed in the men's 470 event at the 1988 Summer Olympics.
