= Armanto Ortolano =

Greek sailor

Personal information
- Nationality: Greek
- Born: 19 February 1965 (age 60); Kassel, Germany

Sport
- Sport: Sailing

Armanto Ortolano (born 19 February 1965) is a Greek sailor. He competed at the 1984 Summer Olympics, the 1988 Summer Olympics, and the 1992 Summer Olympics.
