= Sailing at the 2010 Asian Games – Men's Mistral =

Men's Mistral at the 2010 Asian Games
- Venue: Shanwei Water Sports Center
- Date: 14–20 November 2010
- Competitors: 8 from 8 nations

Medalists
gold medal	Chan King Yin	Hong Kong
silver medal	Oka Sulaksana	Indonesia
bronze medal	Yao Fuwen	China

The men's Mistral competition at the 2010 Asian Games in Shanwei was held from 14 to 20 November 2010.

== Schedule ==
All times are China Standard Time (UTC+08:00)

Date	Time	Event
Sunday, 14 November 2010	12:00	Race 1
Sunday, 14 November 2010	12:00	Race 2
Monday, 15 November 2010	12:00	Race 3
Monday, 15 November 2010	12:00	Race 4
Tuesday, 16 November 2010	12:00	Race 5
Tuesday, 16 November 2010	12:00	Race 6
Wednesday, 17 November 2010	12:00	Race 7
Wednesday, 17 November 2010	12:00	Race 8
Friday, 19 November 2010	12:00	Race 9
Saturday, 20 November 2010	12:00	Race 10
Saturday, 20 November 2010	12:00	Race 11
Saturday, 20 November 2010	12:00	Race 12

== Results ==
Legend

- DNC — Did not come to the starting area
- DNF — Did not finish

Rank	Athlete	Race												Total
Rank	Athlete	1	2	3	4	5	6	7	8	9	10	11	12	Total
1st place, gold medalist(s)	Chan King Yin (HKG)	1	~~(5)~~	2	3	3	2	1	2	2	1	1	1	19
2nd place, silver medalist(s)	Oka Sulaksana (INA)	2	2	1	2	~~(4)~~	1	3	1	1	4	4	2	23
3rd place, bronze medalist(s)	Yao Fuwen (CHN)	3	1	3	1	1	3	2	~~(4)~~	3	2	3	4	26
4	Song Myung-keun (KOR)	4	3	4	~~(5)~~	5	4	5	3	4	3	2	3	40
5	Seksan Khunthong (THA)	5	4	5	4	2	~~(6)~~	4	5	5	5	6	6	51
6	Joshua Choo (SIN)	6	6	6	6	6	5	6	6	6	6	~~(7)~~	7	66
7	Muhammad Sajjad (PAK)	7	8	7	7	8	7	~~(9)~~; DNF	9 DNC	7	7	5	5	77
8	Chameera Lakshan (SRI)	~~(8)~~	7	8	8	7	8	7	7	8	8	8	8	84
