= Xu Yuan Zhen =

Singaporean sailor

Personal information
- Full name: Xu Yuan Zhen
- Nickname: XYZ
- Nationality: Singapore
- Born: 25 April 1985 (age 41) Singapore
- Height: 1.69 m (5 ft 6 1/2 in)
- Weight: 60 kg (132 lb)

Sailing career
- Sport: Sailing
- Club: National Optimist Sailing Scheme
- Coached by: Craig Ferris (AUS)
- Class: Dinghy (470)
Medal record
Men's sailing
Representing Singapore
Asian Games
Silver medal – second place	2006 Doha	470

Xu Yuan Zhen (born 25 April 1985) is a Singaporean former sailor, who specialized in the two-person dinghy (470) class. A member of the Singapore Sailing Federation, Xu trained for the Games under head coach Craig Ferris.

At the 2006 Asian Games in Doha, Qatar, Xu and Terence Koh won the silver medal in the men's 470.

Xu competed for the Singaporean sailing squad, as a skipper in the men's 470 class, at the 2008 Summer Olympics in Beijing. He and Koh topped the selection criteria in a three-way battle with two other teams comprising Roy Tay and Chung Peiming, and Teo Wee Chin and Benjamin Tan, based on their cumulative scores attained at three international regattas stipulated by the Singapore Sailing Federation.

At the Olympics, Xu and Koh suffered a disqualification in the 5th race. However they managed two top 10 finishes in the 6th and 7th races, coming in at the 8th and 10th position respectively. Discarding the points from the disqualification, they were placed twenty-second overall with 159 net points.

After the Olympics, Xu stopped sailing to concentrate on studies while his partner retired due to a back injury and focusing on his business and studies.
