= Hans Natorp =

Danish sailor (born 1964)

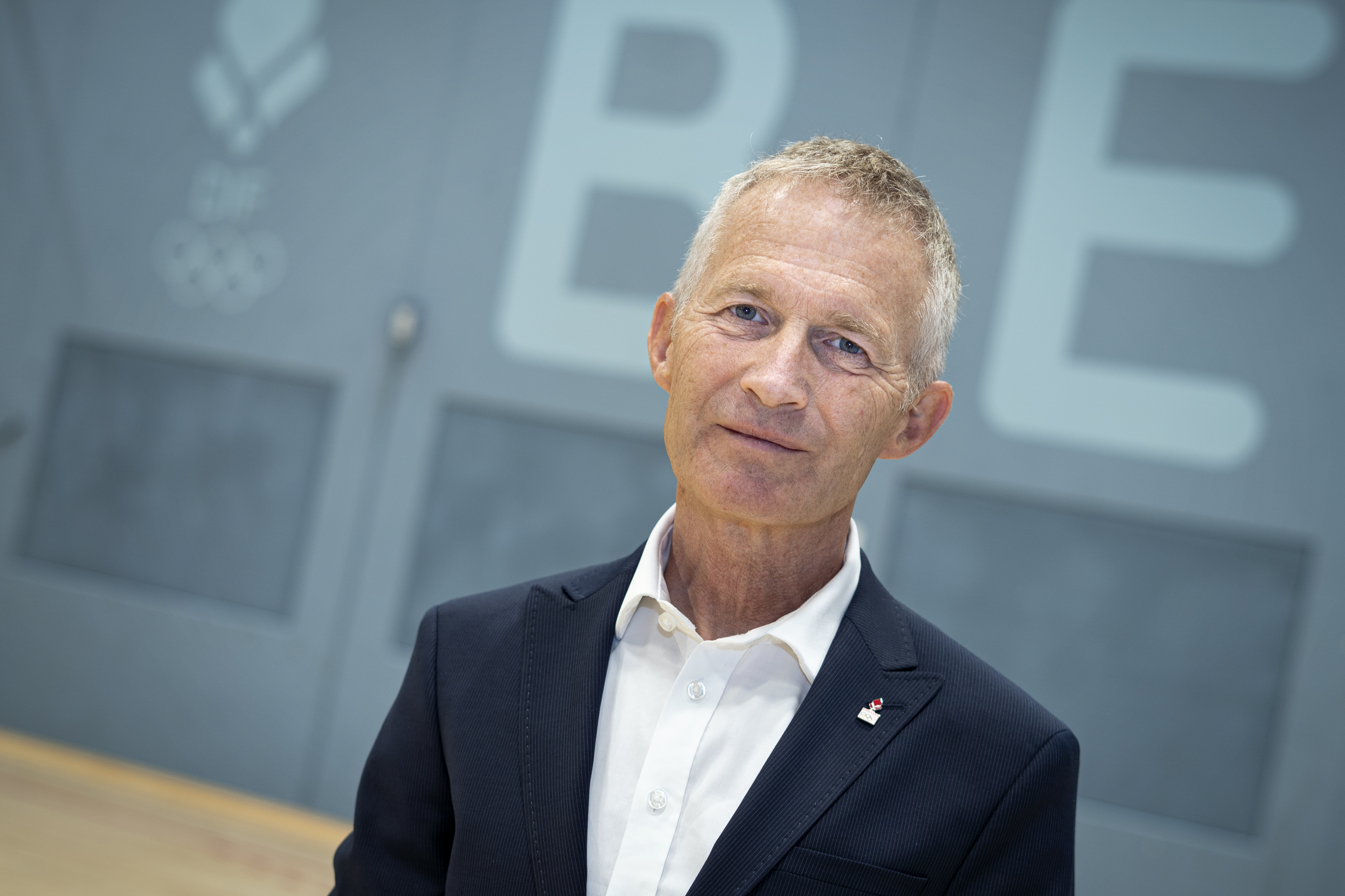

Personal information
- Nationality: Danish
- Born: 29 August 1964 (age 61) Sønderborg, Denmark

Sport
- Sport: Sailing

Hans Natorp (born 29 August 1964) is a Danish sailor. He competed in the men's 470 event at the 1988 Summer Olympics. On 21 June 2021, he was elected President of the National Olympic Committee and Sports Confederation of Denmark.
