= Hermann Megenthaler =

Mexican sailor (born 1962)

Personal information
- Nationality: Mexican
- Born: 15 March 1962 (age 63)

Sport
- Sport: Sailing

Hermann Megenthaler (born 15 March 1962) is a Mexican sailor. He competed in the 470 event at the 1984 Summer Olympics.
