= Sean Reeves =

New Zealand sailor

Personal information
- Nationality: New Zealand
- Born: 23 May 1961 (age 63); New Plymouth, New Zealand

Sport
- Sport: Sailing

Sean Reeves (born 23 May 1961) is a New Zealand sailor. He competed in the 470 event at the 1984 Summer Olympics.
