= Sailing at the 2010 Asian Games – Match racing =

2010 Asian Games event

Open match racing at the 2010 Asian Games
- Venue: Shanwei Water Sports Center
- Date: 16–20 November 2010
- Competitors: 38 from 8 nations

Medalists
gold medal	Japan; Wataru Sakamoto, Daichi Wada, Yasuhiro Okamoto, Hiroaki Yoshifuji
silver medal	India; Farokh Tarapore, Balraj, Atool Sinha, Shekhar Singh Yadav, Balkrishna Helegaonkar
bronze medal	South Korea; Park Gun-woo, Lee Dong-woo, Kim Sung-wok, Cho Sung-min, Nam Yong-jin

The open J/80 competition at the 2010 Asian Games in Shanwei was held from 16 to 20 November 2010. The competition was match race format. It consisted of a round-robin a semi-finals and final series. The top four crews from the round-robin were seeded into the semifinal.

== Schedule ==
All times are China Standard Time (UTC+08:00)

Date	Time	Event
Tuesday, 16 November 2010	11:00	Round robin
Wednesday, 17 November 2010	11:00	Round robin
Friday, 19 November 2010	11:00	Round robin
Saturday, 20 November 2010	11:00	Round robin
Saturday, 20 November 2010	11:00	Semifinals
Saturday, 20 November 2010	11:00	Finals

== Squads ==
Bahrain	China	India	Japan
Kacem Ben Jemia; Abdulrahim Abdulla Sadeq; Ebrahim Abdulla Sadeq; Ebrahim Khamis Hazeem; Muhanna Al-Doseri	Wang Ru; Ni Xiaowen; Li Xiaoni; Pan Tingting; Zhou Jing	Farokh Tarapore; Balraj; Atool Sinha; Shekhar Singh Yadav; Balkrishna Helegaonkar	Wataru Sakamoto; Daichi Wada; Yasuhiro Okamoto; Hiroaki Yoshifuji
Malaysia	Pakistan	Singapore	South Korea
Masyuri Rahmat; Mohd Farizol Rejab; Ahmad Fakhrizan Deraman; Mohd Adib Ariff; Mohd Karimi Bakar	Zahid Rauf; Rana Waqas; Abdul Hameed; Khalid Hussain; Rehman Ullah	Tan Wearn Haw; Benjamin Tan; Yurii Siegel; Colin Ng	Park Gun-woo; Lee Dong-woo; Kim Sung-wok; Cho Sung-min; Nam Yong-jin

== Results ==
=== Round robin ===
Pos	Team	Pld	W	L	Pts	KOR	CHN	IND	JPN	SIN	PAK	BRN	MAS
1	South Korea	13	11	2	11	—	W L	W W	W X	W W	W W	W L	W W
2	China	13	9	4	9	L W	—	L W	W L	W L	W W	W W	W X
3	India	14	9	5	9	L L	W L	—	L W	W L	W W	W W	W W
4	Japan	13	8	5	8	L X	L W	W L	—	W L	W W	W L	W W
5	Singapore	14	7	7	7	L L	L W	L W	L W	—	L L	W W	W W
6	Pakistan	14	4	10	4	L L	L L	L L	L L	W W	—	L W	W L
7	Bahrain	14	4	10	4	L W	L L	L L	L W	L L	W L	—	W L
8	Malaysia	13	2	11	2	L L	L X	L L	L L	L L	L W	L W	—

Source: Official results

=== Knockout round ===
Semifinals
1	South Korea	L	L	L
4	Japan	W	W	W
2	China	W	W	L	L	L
3	India	L	L	W	W	W

Final
4	Japan	W	W	W
3	India	L	L	L
Bronze
1	South Korea	W	W	L	W
2	China	L	L	W	L
