= Wakako Tabata =

Japanese sailor (born 1983)

Wakako Tabata (田畑 和歌子; born 12 October 1983) is a Japanese sports sailor. She competed in the 2011 ISAF Sailing World Championships – Women's 470 with Ai Kondo Yoshida, finishing in 6th place. She won the gold in the Women's 470 (also with Kondo) at the 2010 Asian Games as a representative of Japan. At the 2012 Summer Olympics, she competed in the Women's 470 class, once again with Kondo.
