= Sailing at the 2010 Asian Games – Women's 470 =

Women's 470 at the 2010 Asian Games
- Venue: Shanwei Water Sports Center
- Date: 14–20 November 2010
- Competitors: 6 from 3 nations

Medalists
gold medal	Ai Kondo; Wakako Tabata	Japan
silver medal	Cai Liping; Gao Yang	China
bronze medal	Dawn Liu; Siobhan Tam	Singapore

The women's 470 competition at the 2010 Asian Games in Shanwei was held from 14 to 20 November 2010.

== Schedule ==
All times are China Standard Time (UTC+08:00)

Date	Time	Event
Sunday, 14 November 2010	12:00	Race 1
Sunday, 14 November 2010	12:00	Race 2
Monday, 15 November 2010	12:00	Race 3
Monday, 15 November 2010	12:00	Race 4
Tuesday, 16 November 2010	12:00	Race 5
Tuesday, 16 November 2010	12:00	Race 6
Wednesday, 17 November 2010	12:00	Race 7
Wednesday, 17 November 2010	12:00	Race 8
Friday, 19 November 2010	12:00	Race 9
Saturday, 20 November 2010	12:00	Race 10
Saturday, 20 November 2010	12:00	Race 11
Saturday, 20 November 2010	12:00	Race 12

== Results ==
Rank	Team	Race												Total
Rank	Team	1	2	3	4	5	6	7	8	9	10	11	12	Total
1st place, gold medalist(s)	Japan (JPN); Ai Kondo; Wakako Tabata	1	1	1	1	~~(2)~~	1	1	1	1	1	1	2	12
2nd place, silver medalist(s)	China (CHN); Cai Liping; Gao Yang	2	2	2	2	~~(3)~~	3	2	2	2	2	2	1	22
3rd place, bronze medalist(s)	Singapore (SIN); Dawn Liu; Siobhan Tam	~~(3)~~	3	3	3	1	2	3	3	3	3	3	3	30
