= Andrew Hemmings =

British sailor (born 1954)

Andrew Gailbraith Hemmings (born 9 August 1964 in Reading, Berkshire) is a British sailor who has sailed at the Olympic Games and in multiple America's Cups. He is the author of the book, Crewing to Win published in 1994.

Hemmings was a world youth champion in the 470 and former UK and world champion in the 420. He was also UK, European and World champion in the J/24. He was selected to represent Great Britain at the 1988 Summer Olympics, sailing in a 470 with Jason Belben. The pair placed 15th. He again represented Great Britain at the 1992 Summer Olympics, placing 6th in the Men's 470 alongside Paul Brotherton.

Hemmings sailed as a trimmer with Luna Rossa Challenge in the 2003 Louis Vuitton Cup before joining Team New Zealand for the 2007 Louis Vuitton Cup. Hemmings currently sails as a downwind trimmer on Alegre in the TP52 Super Series and Heartbreaker in the GL52 series co-winning the GL52 Summer series in 2023.
