= Park Gun-woo (sailor) =

South Korean sailor

Personal information
- Nationality: South Korea
- Born: 31 March 1981 (age 45) Seoul, South Korea
- Height: 1.74 m (5 ft 9 in)
- Weight: 64 kg (141 lb)

Sailing career
- Sport: Sailing
- Club: Busan Match Team
- Class(es): Dinghy, match race
Medal record
Men's sailing
Representing South Korea
Asian Games
Bronze medal – third place	2010 Guangzhou	Match racing
Silver medal – second place	2014 Incheon	Match racing

Park Gun-woo (Korean: 박건우, also known as Park Geon-wu, born 31 March 1981 in Seoul) is a South Korean sailor, who specialized in two-person dinghy (470) and open match racing classes. He claimed a bronze medal, as a member of the South Korean sailing team, in match racing at the 2010 Asian Games, and later represented South Korea at the 2012 Summer Olympics. As of September 2013, Park is ranked no. 134 in the world for two-person dinghy class by the International Sailing Federation.

Park made his official debut at the 2010 Asian Games in Guangzhou, where he captured a bronze medal for the South Korean team in a match duel against the host nation China with a scintillating record of 3–1.

At the 2012 Summer Olympics in London, Park competed as a boat skipper in the men's 470 class by receiving a berth from the World Championships in Barcelona, Spain. Teaming with his crew member and partner Cho Sung-Min in the opening series, Park pulled off a twenty-second-place finish in a fleet of twenty-seven boats with an accumulated net score of 169 points.
