= Juan de la Fuente =

Argentine sailor (born 1976)

Medal record

Men's sailing

Representing Argentina

Olympic Games
Bronze medal – third place	2000 Sydney	Men's 470
Bronze medal – third place	2012 London	Men's 470

Juan María de la Fuente (born 15 August 1976 in Buenos Aires) is a sailor from Argentina who won a bronze medal at the 2000 Summer Olympics in Sydney, alongside Javier Conte. At the 2012 Summer Olympics in London he also won a bronze medal alongside Lucas Calabrese.
