= Gord McIlquham =

Canadian sailor

Personal information
- Full name: Gordon McIlquham
- Born: 9 January 1961 (age 65) Kingston, Ontario, Canada

Sport
- Sport: Sailing

Gord McIlquham (born 9 January 1961) is a Canadian sailor. He competed in the men's 470 event at the 1988 Summer Olympics.
