= Sin Gwang-su (sailor) =

South Korean sailor

Personal information
- Nationality: South Korean
- Born: 1 March 1965 (age 60)
- Height: 175 cm (5 ft 9 in)
- Weight: 66 kg (146 lb)

Sport
- Sport: Sailing

Sin Gwang-su (Korean: 신광수, also known as Shin Kwang-soo, born 1 March 1965) is a South Korean former sailor. He competed in the men's 470 event at the 1988 Summer Olympics.
