= Martin Tenhove =

Canadian sailor

Personal information
- Born: 20 August 1959 (age 67) Hamilton, Ontario, Canada

Sport
- Sport: Sailing

Martin Tenhove (born 20 August 1959) is a Canadian sailor. He competed in the 470 event at the 1984 Summer Olympics.
