= Trace Tervo =

United States Virgin Islands sailor

Personal information
- Full name: Trace Alexander Tervo
- Born: October 30, 1962 (age 62); Minnesota, U.S.
- Height: 177 cm (5 ft 10 in)
- Weight: 74 kg (163 lb)

Sport
- Sport: Sailing

Trace Alexander Tervo (born October 30, 1962) is a sailor who represented the United States Virgin Islands. He competed in the 470 event at the 1984 Summer Olympics.
