= Chris Steinfeld =

American sailor

Personal information
- Born: December 14, 1959 (age 66) Denver, Colorado, USA
Medal record
Men's sailing
Representing the United States
Olympic Games
| Silver medal – second place | 1984 Los Angeles | 470 class |

Hans Christopher Steinfeld (born December 14, 1959, in Denver, Colorado) is a former American competitive sailor and Olympic silver medalist.

== Career ==
At the 1984 Summer Olympics, Steinfeld finished in 2nd place in the 470 class Mixed Two-Person Dinghy along with his partner Steve Benjamin.
