= Ranil Dias =

Sri Lankan sailor

Personal information
- Nationality: Sri Lankan
- Born: 2 August 1957 (age 68)

Sport
- Sport: Sailing

Ranil Dias (born 2 August 1957) is a Sri Lankan sailor. He competed in the 470 event at the 1984 Summer Olympics.
