= Steve Benjamin (sailor) =

American sailor (born 1955)

Personal information
- Full name: Stephen DeLancey Benjamin
- Born: September 29, 1955 (age 70) Glen Cove, New York, U.S.

Sport
- College team: Yale University
Medal record
Men's sailing
Representing the United States
Olympic Games
Silver medal – second place	1984 Los Angeles	470 class

Stephen DeLancey Benjamin (born September 29, 1955) is an American competitive sailor and Olympic silver medalist.

== Career ==
He was College Sailor of the Year in 1978. At the 1984 Summer Olympics, Benjamin finished in 2nd place in the 470 class Mixed Two-Person Dinghy along with his partner Chris Steinfeld.

Steve is an Etchells Class World Champion, having won the championship in 2017 and finishing in 2nd place in 2023.

Steve is an Atlantic Class National Champion, having won the National Championship 5 times.

Steve was named US Sailing’s 2015 Yachtsman of the Year
