= Mark Lyttle =

Irish sailor

Personal information
- Nationality: Irish
- Born: 16 June 1963 (age 61); Dublin, Ireland

Sport
- Sport: Sailing

Mark Lyttle (born 16 June 1963) is an Irish sailor. He competed in the Laser event at the 1996 Summer Olympics.
