= Jason Belben =

British sailor (born 1965)

Personal information
- Nationality: British
- Born: 13 September 1965 (age 60) Gosport, England

Sport
- Sport: Sailing

Jason Belben (born 13 September 1965) is a British sailor. He competed in the men's 470 event at the 1988 Summer Olympics.
