= Gunnlaugur Jónasson =

Icelandic sailor (born 1962)

Personal information
- Nationality: Icelandic
- Born: 9 April 1962 (age 64)

Sport
- Sport: Sailing

Gunnlaugur Jónasson (born 9 April 1962) is an Icelandic sailor. He competed at the 1984 Summer Olympics and the 1988 Summer Olympics.
