= Deng Daokun =

Chinese sailor

Personal information
- National team: Team China
- Born: May 22, 1978 (age 47); Haikou, Hainan

Deng Daokun (born May 22, 1978, in Haikou, Hainan) is a male Chinese sports sailor. He competed for Team China at the 2008 Summer Olympics, and also participated in the 2012 Summer Olympics.

== Major performances ==
- 2002/2004/2006 National Championships - 3rd/2nd/2nd 470 class;
- 2005/2006/2008 National Champions Tournament - 1st 470 class;
- 2007 National Water Sports Games/National Championships - 1st 470 class
