= Wang Weidong =

Chinese sailor

Wang Weidong (born 22 January 1982 in Baisha, Hainan) is a male Chinese sports sailor who competed for Team China at the 2008 Summer Olympics. He also participated in the 2012 Summer Olympics.

== Major performances ==
- 1997/2005 National Games – 3rd OP class/1st 470 class;
- 2006/2007/2008 National Champions Tournament – 1st 470 class;
- 2006 Asian Championships – 2nd 470 class;
- 2006 Asian Games – 6th 470 class;
- 2007 National Water Sports Games – 1st 470 class
