= Iran at the 2006 Asian Games =

- IOC code: IRI
- NOC: National Olympic Committee of the Islamic Republic of Iran

in Doha
- Competitors: 239 in 25 sports
- Flag bearer: Hossein Rezazadeh
- Medals Ranked 6th: Gold 11 Silver 15 Bronze 22 Total 48

Asian Games appearances (overview)
- 1951; 1954; 1958; 1962; 1966; 1970; 1974; 1978; 1982; 1986; 1990; 1994; 1998; 2002; 2006; 2010; 2014; 2018; 2022; 2026

Iran participated in the 2006 Asian Games held in the city of Doha. This country is ranked 6th with 11 gold medals in this edition of the Asiad.

== Competitors ==
Sport	Men	Women	Total
Athletics	11	3	14
Badminton		2	2
Basketball	12		12
Bodybuilding	8		8
Boxing	10		10
Canoeing	7	2	9
Chess	2	1	3
Cycling	12		12
Equestrian	3	1	4
Fencing	10		10
Football	20		20
Gymnastics artistic	5		5
Handball	15		15
Judo	8		8
Kabaddi	12		12
Karate	5		5
Rowing	4	4	8
Sepak takraw	4		4
Shooting	4	7	11
Swimming	8		8
Taekwondo	6	6	12
Volleyball	12		12
Water polo	13		13
Weightlifting	1		1
Wrestling	14		14
Wushu	7		7
Total	213	26	239

== Medal summary ==
=== Medals by sport ===
Sport	Gold	Silver	Bronze	Total
Athletics	1		1	2
Basketball			1	1
Boxing	1		3	4
Canoeing		1		1
Chess			1	1
Cycling road		2		2
Cycling track		1	1	2
Fencing			2	2
Football			1	1
Handball			1	1
Judo		3	1	4
Karate	3		2	5
Taekwondo	1	2	5	8
Weightlifting	1			1
Wrestling	4	5	1	10
Wushu		1	2	3
Total	11	15	22	48

=== Medalists ===
Medal	Name	Sport	Event
Gold	Ehsan Haddadi	Athletics	Men's discus throw
Gold	Ali Mazaheri	Boxing	Men's 91 kg
Gold	Hossein Rouhani	Karate	Men's kumite 60 kg
Gold	Hassan Rouhani	Karate	Men's kumite 65 kg
Gold	Jasem Vishkaei	Karate	Men's kumite 75 kg
Gold	Yousef Karami	Taekwondo	Men's 84 kg
Gold	Hossein Rezazadeh	Weightlifting	Men's +105 kg
Gold	Morad Mohammadi	Wrestling	Men's freestyle 60 kg
Gold	Ali Asghar Bazri	Wrestling	Men's freestyle 74 kg
Gold	Reza Yazdani	Wrestling	Men's freestyle 84 kg
Gold	Alireza Heidari	Wrestling	Men's freestyle 96 kg
Silver	Abbas Sayyadi; Reza Raeisi	Canoeing	Men's K2 1000 m
Silver	Mehdi Sohrabi	Cycling road	Men's road race
Silver	Hossein Askari; Alireza Haghi; Ghader Mizbani; Abbas Saeidi Tanha	Cycling road	Men's team time trial
Silver	Hossein Nateghi; Abbas Saeidi Tanha; Mehdi Sohrabi; Amir Zargari	Cycling track	Men's team pursuit
Silver	Arash Miresmaeili	Judo	Men's 66 kg
Silver	Mohammad Reza Roudaki	Judo	Men's +100 kg
Silver	Mahmoud Miran	Judo	Men's openweight
Silver	Mehdi Bibak	Taekwondo	Men's 78 kg
Silver	Mehdi Navaei	Taekwondo	Men's +84 kg
Silver	Fardin Masoumi	Wrestling	Men's freestyle 120 kg
Silver	Jasem Amiri	Wrestling	Men's Greco-Roman 55 kg
Silver	Davoud Abedinzadeh	Wrestling	Men's Greco-Roman 74 kg
Silver	Masoud Hashemzadeh	Wrestling	Men's Greco-Roman 96 kg
Silver	Mehdi Sharabiani	Wrestling	Men's Greco-Roman 120 kg
Silver	Alireza Sahraneshini	Wushu	Men's sanshou 60 kg
Bronze	Ehsan Mohajer Shojaei	Athletics	Men's 800 m
Bronze	Pouya Tajik; Amir Amini; Saman Veisi; Mehdi Kamrani; Samad Nikkhah Bahrami; Iman Zandi; Hamed Afagh; Alireza Honardoust; Aidin Nikkhah Bahrami; Karam Ahmadian; Mousa Nabipour; Hamed Haddadi	Basketball	Men
Bronze	Mohammad Sattarpour	Boxing	Men's 69 kg
Bronze	Mehdi Ghorbani	Boxing	Men's 81 kg
Bronze	Jasem Delavari	Boxing	Men's +91 kg
Bronze	Ehsan Ghaemmaghami; Elshan Moradi; Atousa Pourkashian	Chess	Mixed team standard
Bronze	Mehdi Sohrabi; Amir Zargari	Cycling track	Men's madison
Bronze	Ali Yaghoubian	Fencing	Men's individual épée
Bronze	Siamak Feiz-Asgari; Mohammad Rezaei; Hamed Sedaghati; Ali Yaghoubian	Fencing	Men's team épée
Bronze	Alireza Haghighi; Mohsen Arzani; Jalal Akbari; Jalal Hosseini; Pejman Montazeri; Behshad Yavarzadeh; Milad Nouri; Maziar Zare; Mehrdad Oladi; Arash Borhani; Mohammad Gholamin; Sheys Rezaei; Saeid Chahjouei; Hossein Mahini; Mohammad Nouri; Khosro Heidari; Ehsan Khorsandi; Adel Kolahkaj; Mehrdad Pouladi; Hassan Roudbarian	Football	Men
Bronze	Iman Ehsannejad; Mohammad Reza Rajabi; Mohammad Reza Jafarnia; Hani Zamani; Masoud Zohrabi; Saeid Pourghasemi; Mostafa Sadati; Allahkaram Esteki; Farid Alimoradi; Alireza Rabie; Hossein Shahabi; Ali Akbar Khoshnevis; Rasoul Dehghani; Peyman Sadeghi; Hojjat Rahshenas	Handball	Men
Bronze	Masoud Haji Akhondzadeh	Judo	Men's 60 kg
Bronze	Saeid Farrokhi	Karate	Men's kumite 70 kg
Bronze	Esmaeil Torkzad	Karate	Men's kumite 80 kg
Bronze	Behzad Khodadad	Taekwondo	Men's 58 kg
Bronze	Alireza Nasr Azadani	Taekwondo	Men's 67 kg
Bronze	Hadi Saei	Taekwondo	Men's 72 kg
Bronze	Mahrouz Saei	Taekwondo	Women's 72 kg
Bronze	Afsaneh Sheikhi	Taekwondo	Women's +72 kg
Bronze	Hamid Reihani	Wrestling	Men's Greco-Roman 66 kg
Bronze	Jalil Ataei	Wushu	Men's sanshou 56 kg
Bronze	Khosro Minoo	Wushu	Men's sanshou 70 kg

== Results by event ==
=== Aquatics ===
==== Swimming ====
Athlete	Event	Heats		Final	
Athlete	Event	Time	Rank	Time	Rank
Hamid Reza Mobarrez	Men's 50 m freestyle	24.23	17	Did not advance	
Pasha Vahdati	Men's 50 m freestyle	24.40	20	Did not advance	
Mohammad Bidarian	Men's 100 m freestyle	52.44	12	Did not advance	
Pasha Vahdati	Men's 100 m freestyle	53.89	23	Did not advance	
Mohammad Bidarian	Men's 200 m freestyle	1:56.84	19	Did not advance	
Soheil Maleka Ashtiani	Men's 200 m freestyle	1:58.17	22	Did not advance	
Soheil Maleka Ashtiani	Men's 400 m freestyle	4:31.66	23	Did not advance	
Mohammad Bidarian	Men's 1500 m freestyle	DNS	—	—N/a	
Shahin Baradaran	Men's 50 m backstroke	28.74	22	Did not advance	
Shahin Baradaran	Men's 100 m backstroke	1:01.14	15	Did not advance	
Shahin Baradaran	Men's 200 m backstroke	2:13.61	14	Did not advance	
Mohammad Alirezaei	Men's 50 m breaststroke	29.65	12	Did not advance	
Mohammad Alirezaei	Men's 100 m breaststroke	1:05.04	12	Did not advance	
Saeid Maleka Ashtiani	Men's 50 m butterfly	27.24	32	Did not advance	
Hamid Reza Mobarrez	Men's 50 m butterfly	25.55	14	Did not advance	
Saeid Maleka Ashtiani	Men's 100 m butterfly	59.09	24	Did not advance	
Hamid Reza Mobarrez	Men's 100 m butterfly	56.51	15	Did not advance	
Shahin Baradaran	Men's 200 m individual medley	2:14.15	18	Did not advance	
Shahin Baradaran	Men's 400 m individual medley	4:43.61	14	Did not advance	
Saeid Maleka Ashtiani	Men's 400 m individual medley	4:45.13	16	Did not advance	
Emin Noshadi; Mohammad Bidarian; Pasha Vahdati; Soheil Maleka Ashtiani	Men's 4 × 100 m freestyle relay	3:33.09	9	Did not advance	
Emin Noshadi; Mohammad Bidarian; Saeid Maleka Ashtiani; Soheil Maleka Ashtiani	Men's 4 × 200 m freestyle relay	7:45.54	8 Q	7:50.10	7
Shahin Baradaran; Mohammad Alirezaei; Hamid Reza Mobarrez; Mohammad Bidarian	Men's 4 × 100 m medley relay	3:56.12	8 Q	3:55.11	8

==== Water polo ====
Team	Event	Preliminary round					Semifinal	Final	Rank
Team	Event	Round 1	Round 2	Round 3	Round 4	Rank	Semifinal	Final	Rank
Iran	Men	Kazakhstan; D 10–10	Qatar; W 17–3	Philippines; W WO (5–0)	South Korea; W 14–9	2 Q	China; L 7–12	3rd place match Kazakhstan; L 8–12	4
Roster: Alireza Shahidipour; Bahman Mouchehkiani; Saeid Mirmehdi; Milad Mohammadi; Mohammad Mehdi Tayyaran; Mehdi Karami; Amir Abbas Akbarnejad; Soheil Khadempir; Kambiz Rakhshanimehr; Yashar Soltani; Arameh Aghazarian; Mohsen Rezvani; Meisam Jafari; Coach: (Croatia) Neven Kovačević

=== Athletics ===
Track

Athlete	Event	Round 1		Final	Rank
Athlete	Event	Time	Rank	Time	Rank
Reza Bouazar	Men's 400 m	46.96	2 Q	47.07	5
Ehsan Mohajer Shojaei	Men's 800 m	1:52.18	2 Q	1:47.43	3rd place, bronze medalist(s)
Sajjad Moradi	Men's 1500 m	3:51.11	3 Q	DNF	—
Rouhollah Asgari	Men's 110 m hurdles	DNS	—	Did not advance	—
Maryam Tousi	Women's 200 m	25.23	4	Did not advance	13
Maryam Tousi	Women's 400 m	57.83	6	Did not advance	11
Leila Ebrahimi	Women's 800 m	2:17.16	4	Did not advance	12
Mina Pourseifi	Women's 800 m	2:18.35	5	Did not advance	13
Leila Ebrahimi	Women's 1500 m	—N/a		4:42.91	10
Mina Pourseifi	Women's 1500 m	—N/a		4:47.99	11

Field

Athlete	Event	Qualification		Final	
Athlete	Event	Result	Rank	Result	Rank
Mohsen Rabbani	Men's pole vault	—N/a		5.30	4
Mohammad Arzandeh	Men's long jump	6.92	15	Did not advance	
Afshin Daghari Hemadi	Men's triple jump	—N/a		15.63	11
Mehdi Shahrokhi	Men's shot put	—N/a		17.50	8
Ehsan Haddadi	Men's discus throw	—N/a		63.79	1st place, gold medalist(s)
Abbas Samimi	Men's discus throw	—N/a		59.69	4

Combined

Athlete	Event	100m	LJ	SP	HJ	400m	110mH	DT	PV	JT	1500m	Total	Rank
Hadi Sepehrzad	Men's decathlon	10.94; 874	6.45 m 686	15.26 m 806	1.85 m 670	51.04; 767	15.35; 808	46.75 m 803	3.80 m 562	46.41 m 536	5:14.28; 480	6992	7

=== Badminton ===
Athlete	Event	Round of 32	Round of 16	Quarterfinal	Semifinal	Final	Rank
Behnaz Pirzamanbin	Women's singles	Ponsana (THA); L 0–2 (4–21, 8–21)	Did not advance				17
Nakisa Soltani	Women's singles	Chansrisukot (THA); L 0–2 (2–21, 13–21)	Did not advance				17
Behnaz Pirzamanbin; Nakisa Soltani	Women's doubles	Bye	Zhang and Yang (CHN); L RET (2–21)	Did not advance			9

=== Basketball ===
Team	Event	Qualification round	Preliminary round						Quarterfinal	Semifinal	Final	Rank
Team	Event	Qualification round	Round 1	Round 2	Round 3	Round 4	Round 5	Rank	Quarterfinal	Semifinal	Final	Rank
Iran	Men	Bye	Jordan; L 59–62	South Korea; W 89–75	Bahrain; W 112–77	Qatar; L 61–78	Syria; W 95–79	3 Q	Japan; W 68–64	Qatar; L 64–67	3rd place match Jordan; W 84–78	3rd place, bronze medalist(s)
Roster: Pouya Tajik; Amir Amini; Saman Veisi; Mehdi Kamrani; Samad Nikkhah Bahrami; Iman Zandi; Hamed Afagh; Alireza Honardoust; Aidin Nikkhah Bahrami; Karam Ahmadian; Mousa Nabipour; Hamed Haddadi; Coach: (Nigeria) Fred Oniga

=== Bodybuilding ===
Athlete	Event	Prejudging		Final		
Athlete	Event	Score	Rank	Score	Total	Rank
Saman Sarabi	Men's 70 kg	22	4 Q	23	45	4
Beitollah Abbaspour	Men's 75 kg	26	6	Did not advance		
Abbas Agheli	Men's 80 kg	41	8	Did not advance		
Reza Bagherzadeh	Men's 85 kg	26	5 Q	23	49	5
Ali Imani	Men's 85 kg	26	6	Did not advance		
Ehsanollah Kangarloo	Men's 90 kg	32	7	Did not advance		
Mohsen Ghorannevis	Men's +90 kg	36	7	Did not advance		
Fereydoun Haghi	Men's +90 kg	30	6	Did not advance		

=== Boxing ===
Athlete	Event	Round of 32	Round of 16	Quarterfinal	Semifinal	Final	Rank
Sadegh Farajzadeh	Men's 48 kg	Bye	Aouda (SYR); L 19–32	Did not advance			9
Omran Akbari	Men's 51 kg	Payla (PHI); L 13–33	Did not advance				17
Mehrdad Hamidian	Men's 57 kg	Dmirieh (SYR); L 7–21	Did not advance				17
Saeid Norouzi	Men's 60 kg	Faizulloev (TJK); L RSCOS	Did not advance				17
Morteza Sepahvand	Men's 64 kg	Hawawreh (JOR); W RSCOS	Murzakerimov (KGZ); W 32–12	Boonjumnong (THA); L 10–14	Did not advance		5
Mohammad Sattarpour	Men's 69 kg	Bye	Kumara (SRI); W 28–19	Hirano (JPN); W 27–15	Chomphuphuang (THA); L 18–36	Did not advance	3rd place, bronze medalist(s)
Homayoun Amiri	Men's 75 kg	—N/a	Rasulov (UZB); L RET	Did not advance			9
Mehdi Ghorbani	Men's 81 kg	—N/a	Al-Shemmari (KUW); W RSCOS	Haydarov (UZB); W 31–18	Qurbonov (TJK); L RSCOS	Did not advance	3rd place, bronze medalist(s)
Ali Mazaheri	Men's 91 kg	—N/a	Makrausov (TJK); W RSCOS	Turgunov (KGZ); W RSCI	Gotfrid (KAZ); W 26–24	Matchanov (UZB); W 25–19	1st place, gold medalist(s)
Jasem Delavari	Men's +91 kg	—N/a		Ismael (SYR); W 26–13	Saidov (UZB); L RSCOS	Did not advance	3rd place, bronze medalist(s)

=== Canoeing ===
Athlete	Event	Heat		Semifinal		Final	Rank
Athlete	Event	Time	Rank	Time	Rank	Time	Rank
Shahoo Nasseri	Men's C1 500 m	2:18.225	2 QS	2:11.707	2 Q	2:17.109	6
Shahoo Nasseri	Men's C1 1000 m	4:57.421	4 QS	4:31.468	1 Q	5:57.471	6
Omid Khoshkhoo; Sirvan Ahmadi	Men's C2 500 m	1:56.795	2 QS	1:59.712	5	Did not advance	7
Omid Khoshkhoo; Sirvan Ahmadi	Men's C2 1000 m	4:34.671	2 QS	4:06.354	5	Did not advance	7
Reza Raeisi	Men's K1 500 m	2:06.331	2 QS	2:00.050	4	Did not advance	7
Yaser Hedayati	Men's K1 1000 m	4:17.899	1 QF	Bye		4:43.884	5
Yaser Hedayati; Mohsen Milad	Men's K2 500 m	1:44.396	2 QS	1:46.355	2 Q	1:41.182	6
Abbas Sayyadi; Reza Raeisi	Men's K2 1000 m	3:52.036	2 QS	3:37.831	2 Q	3:58.491	2nd place, silver medalist(s)
Elaheh Kharazmi	Women's K1 500 m	2:20.861	3 QS	2:15.332	4 Q	2:12.528	6
Sonia Nourizad; Elaheh Kharazmi	Women's K2 500 m	2:12.843	1 QF	Bye		1:54.997	6

=== Chess ===
Individual rapid

Athlete	Event	Swiss round									Rank
Athlete	Event	Round 1	Round 2	Round 3	Round 4	Round 5	Round 6	Round 7	Round 8	Round 9	Rank
Ehsan Ghaemmaghami	Men	Gündavaa (MGL); D ½–½	Hakki (SYR); W 1–0	Laylo (PHI); D ½–½	Anuruddha (SRI); W 1–0	Đào (VIE); L 0–1	Batchuluun (MGL); W 1–0	Hossain (BAN); D ½–½	Nguyễn (VIE); D ½–½	Harikrishna (IND); L 0–1	16
Elshan Moradi	Men	Ayyad (BRN); W 1–0	Harikrishna (IND); D ½–½	Adianto (INA); W 1–0	Al-Modiahki (QAT); L 0–1	Laylo (PHI); D ½–½	Megaranto (INA); W 1–0	Nguyễn (VIE); D ½–½	Hossain (BAN); W 1–0	Đào (VIE); L 0–1	7
Atousa Pourkashian	Women	Methmali (SRI); W 1–0	Mutaywea (BRN); W 1–0	Zhu (QAT); W 1–0	Humpy (IND); L 0–1	Nguyễn (VIE); D ½–½	Sabirova (UZB); W 1–0	Zhao (CHN); L 0–1	Möngöntuul (MGL); W 1–0	Geldiýewa (TKM); L 0–1	4

Team standard

Athlete	Event	Swiss round									Rank
Athlete	Event	Round 1	Round 2	Round 3	Round 4	Round 5	Round 6	Round 7	Round 8	Round 9	Rank
Ehsan Ghaemmaghami; Elshan Moradi; Atousa Pourkashian	Mixed	Sri Lanka; W 2½–½	Bangladesh; D 1½–1½	China; L ½–2½	Mongolia; W 2½–½	Indonesia; D 1½–1½	Turkmenistan; W 3–0	India; L ½–2½	Uzbekistan; D 1½–1½	Qatar; W 3–0	3rd place, bronze medalist(s)

=== Cycling ===
==== Road ====
Athlete	Event	Time	Rank
Hossein Askari	Men's road race	3:45:05	7
Mehdi Sohrabi	Men's road race	3:45:02	2nd place, silver medalist(s)
Ghader Mizbani	Men's individual time trial	58:09.35	5
Hossein Askari; Alireza Haghi; Ghader Mizbani; Abbas Saeidi Tanha	Men's team time trial	1:25:56.60	2nd place, silver medalist(s)

==== Track ====
Sprint

Athlete	Event	Qualifying		Round of 16	Quarterfinal	Semifinal	Final	Rank
Athlete	Event	Time	Rank	Round of 16	Quarterfinal	Semifinal	Time	Rank
Mohammad Abouheidari	Men's sprint	11.625	14 Q	Tang (CHN); L 0–1	9th–16th places Morales (PHI); L 0–1	Did not advance		14
Alireza Ahmadi	Men's sprint	11.482	12 Q	Wang (CHN); L 0–1	9th–16th places Shambih (UAE); L 0–1	Did not advance		13
Hassan Ali Varposhti	Men's 1 km time trial	—N/a					1:07.128	6
Farshid Farsinejadian; Mahmoud Parash; Hassan Ali Varposhti	Men's team sprint	47.768	5	—N/a			Did not advance	5

Keirin

Athlete	Event	Round 1	Repechage	Round 2	Final	Rank
Athlete	Event	Rank	Rank	Rank	Rank	Rank
Farshid Farsinejadian	Men's keirin	4	1 Q	4 QB	Final B 4	10
Mahmoud Parash	Men's keirin	2 Q	Bye	3 QA	6	6

Endurance

Athlete	Event	Qualifying		Final	Rank
Athlete	Event	Time / Score	Rank	Time / Score	Rank
Alireza Haghi	Men's individual pursuit	4:42.882	8	Did not advance	8
Mehdi Sohrabi	Men's individual pursuit	4:39.265	4 QB	3rd place match Hwang (KOR); L 4:39.525–4:38.589	4
Hossein Askari	Men's points race	23 pts	7 Q	4 pts	7
Abbas Saeidi Tanha	Men's points race	21 pts	5 Q	DNF	—
Mehdi Sohrabi; Amir Zargari	Men's madison	—N/a		17 pts	3rd place, bronze medalist(s)
Hossein Nateghi; Abbas Saeidi Tanha; Mehdi Sohrabi; Amir Zargari	Men's team pursuit	4:16.519	2 Q	South Korea; L 4:14.226–4:12.746	2nd place, silver medalist(s)

=== Equestrian ===
Athlete	Event	Qualifier / Team final				Final			Jump-off		Rank
Athlete	Event	1st	2nd	Total	Rank	1st	2nd	Total	Pen.	Time	Rank
Arash Gholami Yekta on Enigma 3	Individual jumping	28	16	44	44	Did not advance					44
Alireza Khoshdel on Calumeez	Individual jumping	20	12	32	42	Did not advance					42
Haleh Nikouei on Oklahoma 1	Individual jumping	8	12	20	34	Did not advance					37
Majid Sharifi on Apachee	Individual jumping	12	4	16	26 Q	8	19	27	Not needed		17
Arash Gholami Yekta on Enigma 3 Haleh Nikouei on Oklahoma 1 Majid Sharifi on Apachee; Alireza Khoshdel on Calumeez	Team jumping	40	28	68	10	—N/a					

=== Fencing ===
Épée

Athlete	Event	Pool round		Round of 32	Round of 16	Quarterfinal	Semifinal	Final	Rank
Athlete	Event	Results	Rank	Round of 32	Round of 16	Quarterfinal	Semifinal	Final	Rank
Mohammad Rezaei	Men's individual	Wang (CHN) L 2–5; Shabalin (KAZ) L 3–5; Muzammil (AFG) W 5–1; Hoi (MAC) W 5–2; Mirdjaliev (KGZ) L 4–5; Victorino (PHI) W 5–0	13 Q	Jamaan (QAT); W 15–5	Yaghoubian (IRI); L 12–15	Did not advance			13
Ali Yaghoubian	Men's individual	Kim (KOR) W 5–3; Xie (CHN) L 2–5; Filinov (UZB) W 5–1; El-Khoury (LIB) W 5–4; Busafar (BRN) W 5–3; Salih (IRQ) W 5–0	4 Q	Bye	Rezaei (IRI); W 15–12	Kim (KOR); W 15–13	Wang (CHN); L 5–15	Did not advance	3rd place, bronze medalist(s)
Siamak Feiz-Asgari; Mohammad Rezaei; Hamed Sedaghati; Ali Yaghoubian	Men's team	—N/a			Bye	Kyrgyzstan; W 45–31	China; L 24–45	Did not advance	3rd place, bronze medalist(s)

Foil

Athlete	Event	Pool round		Round of 32	Round of 16	Quarterfinal	Semifinal	Final	Rank
Athlete	Event	Results	Rank	Round of 32	Round of 16	Quarterfinal	Semifinal	Final	Rank
Javad Rezaei	Men's individual	Najem (KUW) W 5–2; Salih (IRQ) W 4–1; Ota (JPN) W 5–4; Ha (KOR) W 5–4; Kudayev (UZB) L 2–5	7 Q	Bye	Segui (PHI); W 14–12	Lei (CHN); L 12–15	Did not advance		7
Hamed Sayyad Ghanbari	Men's individual	Lei (CHN) L 3–5; Dostmuhamedov (UZB) W 5–4; Ngan (HKG) L 2–5; Kadhim (IRQ) W 5–3; Panchan (THA) L 4–5; Al-Hammadi (QAT) W 5–4	14 Q	Endriano (PHI); W 15–13	Panchan (THA); L 9–15	Did not advance			14
Siamak Feiz-Asgari; Javad Rezaei; Mohammad Rezaei; Hamed Sayyad Ghanbari	Men's team	—N/a			Bye	Hong Kong; L 30–45	Did not advance		5

Sabre

Athlete	Event	Pool round		Round of 16	Quarterfinal	Semifinal	Final	Rank
Athlete	Event	Results	Rank	Round of 16	Quarterfinal	Semifinal	Final	Rank
Mojtaba Abedini	Men's individual	Zhou (CHN) L 4–5; Oh (KOR) W 5–1; Tse (HKG) W 5–4; Watanabe (JPN) W 5–1; Al-Saadi (QAT) W 5–1	5 Q	Oh (KOR); W 15–14	Kothny (THA); L 13–15, DSQ	Did not advance		—
Peyman Fakhri	Men's individual	Oh (KOR) L 3–5; Nagara (JPN) W 5–2; Frolov (KAZ) L 1–5; Kazem (KUW) W 5–4; Ketiam (THA) W 5–2; Nocom (PHI) W 5–2	8 Q	Mendoza (PHI); W 15–4	Oh (KOR); L 13–15	Did not advance		6
Parviz Darvishi; Peyman Fakhri; Hamid Reza Taherkhani	Men's team	—N/a		Philippines; W 45–28	China; L 39–45	Did not advance		8

=== Football ===
Team	Event	Qualification round	Preliminary round				Quarterfinal	Semifinal	Final	Rank
Team	Event	Qualification round	Round 1	Round 2	Round 3	Rank	Quarterfinal	Semifinal	Final	Rank
Iran	Men	Bye	Maldives; W 3–1	Hong Kong; W 2–1	India; W 2–0	1 Q	China; W 2–2 (8–7 P)	Qatar; L 0–2	3rd place match South Korea; W 1–0	3rd place, bronze medalist(s)
Roster: Alireza Haghighi; Mohsen Arzani; Jalal Akbari; Jalal Hosseini; Pejman Montazeri; Behshad Yavarzadeh; Milad Nouri; Maziar Zare; Mehrdad Oladi; Arash Borhani; Mohammad Gholamin; Sheys Rezaei; Saeid Chahjouei; Hossein Mahini; Mohammad Nouri; Khosro Heidari; Ehsan Khorsandi; Adel Kolahkaj; Mehrdad Pouladi; Hassan Roudbarian; Coach: (Brazil) René Simões

=== Gymnastics ===
Men – Qualification

Athlete	Event	Floor		Pommel horse		Rings		Vault		Parallel bars		Horizontal bar		Total	
Athlete	Event	Score	Rank	Score	Rank	Score	Rank	Score	Rank	Score	Rank	Score	Rank	Score	Rank
Hamid Reza Babaei	Individual	13.250	41	13.150	36	15.050	11 QR	14.800	—N/a	13.550	44	12.800	47	82.600	23 Q
Mohammad Mehdi Gaeini	Individual	13.550	35	—N/a		—N/a		14.850	—N/a	—N/a		12.100	55	40.500	73
Vahid Izadfar	Individual	—N/a		14.500	21	13.550	35	—N/a		13.600	41	—N/a		41.650	71
Hadi Khanarinejad	Individual	14.050	25	12.550	48	13.000	40	14.950	—N/a	13.950	36	13.750	31	82.250	24 Q
Mohammad Ramezanpour	Individual	13.100	46	14.200	28	12.950	41	14.900	—N/a	13.850	39	13.100	40	82.100	25 (32)
Hamid Reza Babaei; Mohammad Mehdi Gaeini; Vahid Izadfar; Hadi Khanarinejad; Mohammad Ramezanpour	Team	53.950		54.400		54.550		59.500		54.950		51.750		329.100	8

Men – Finals

Athlete	Event	FX	PH	SR	VT	PB	HB	Total	Rank
Hamid Reza Babaei	Individual all-around	13.600	13.300	14.800	14.800	13.600	13.300	83.400	12
Hadi Khanarinejad	Individual all-around	14.450	13.900	14.000	12.450	13.550	13.600	81.950	13
Hamid Reza Babaei	Rings	—N/a		14.900	—N/a				8

=== Handball ===
Team	Event	Preliminary round				Second round				Semifinal	Final	Rank
Team	Event	Round 1	Round 2	Round 3	Rank	Round 1	Round 2	Round 3	Rank	Semifinal	Final	Rank
Iran	Men	China; W 27–25	Kuwait; L 22–31	Hong Kong; W 36–18	2 Q	Qatar; L 24–27	Saudi Arabia; W 28–19	Syria; W 30–25	2 Q	Kuwait; L 22–31	3rd place match South Korea; W 31–27	3rd place, bronze medalist(s)
Roster: Iman Ehsannejad; Mohammad Reza Rajabi; Mohammad Reza Jafarnia; Hani Zamani; Masoud Zohrabi; Saeid Pourghasemi; Mostafa Sadati; Allahkaram Esteki; Farid Alimoradi; Alireza Rabie; Hossein Shahabi; Ali Akbar Khoshnevis; Rasoul Dehghani; Peyman Sadeghi; Hojjat Rahshenas; Coach: (Russia) Yury Klimov

=== Judo ===
Athlete	Event	Round of 32	Round of 16	Quarterfinal	Semifinal	Repechage	Final	Rank
Masoud Haji Akhondzadeh	Men's 60 kg	Sok (CAM); W 1001–0000	Ng (MAC); W 1101–0000	Jia (CHN); W 1121–0002	Cho (KOR); L 0013–0110	Bye	3rd place match Lin (TPE); W 0110–0001	3rd place, bronze medalist(s)
Arash Miresmaeili	Men's 66 kg	Bye	Taslim (INA); W 1000–0000	Al-Hazmi (KSA); W 1000–0000	Nurmuhammedow (TKM); W 1020–0000	Bye	Tsagaanbaatar (MGL); L 0000–0100	2nd place, silver medalist(s)
Zakaria Moradi	Men's 73 kg	Muminov (UZB); L 0001–1001	Did not advance	Repechage; Ralli (THA); W 1000–0000	Repechage; Shi (CHN); W 1031–0010	Repechage; Boqiev (TJK); L 0000–0010	Did not advance	7
Reza Chahkhandagh	Men's 81 kg	—N/a	Hukmatov (TJK); W 1000–0000	Al-Otaibi (KUW); W 1000–0000	Atayev (KAZ); L 0000–0002	Bye	3rd place match Ono (JPN); L 0000–0002	5
Hossein Ghomi	Men's 90 kg	—N/a	Kumar (IND); W 1010–0000	Ariun-Erdene (MGL); W 1100–0001	Rakov (KAZ); L 0001–0010	Bye	3rd place match Sayidov (UZB); L 0000–1000	5
Abbas Fallah	Men's 100 kg	—N/a	Ishii (JPN); L 0000–1000	Did not advance	Repechage; Asranqulov (TJK); W 0011–0010	Repechage; Yin (CHN); W 0110–0010	3rd place match Zhitkeyev (KAZ); L 0001–0021	5
Mohammad Reza Roudaki	Men's +100 kg	—N/a	Bye	Sutthiphun (THA); W 1000–0000	Baeg (KOR); W 0011–0000	Bye	Muneta (JPN); L 0001–0120	2nd place, silver medalist(s)
Mahmoud Miran	Men's openweight	—N/a	Al-Araifi (BRN); W 1001–0001	Kumar (IND); W 1001–0000	Takai (JPN); W 1000–0000	Bye	Kim (KOR); L 0000–0001	2nd place, silver medalist(s)

=== Kabaddi ===
Team	Event	Round robin					Final	Rank
Team	Event	Round 1	Round 2	Round 3	Round 4	Rank	Final	Rank
Iran	Men	Pakistan; L 25–45	Japan; D 24–24	Bangladesh; W 56–39	India; L 17–38	3 QB	3rd place match Bangladesh; L 26–37	4
Roster: Mohammad Shabani; Behzad Bamedi; Abdolhamid Maghsoudloo; Ramezan Ali Paeinmahalli; Aref Fojerdi; Farhad Kamal Gharibi; Ali Doustmohammadi; Mostafa Nodehi; Ali Roshanshomal; Hossein Nosrati; Kianoush Naderian; Nasser Roumiani; Coach: (India) Manjit Singh

=== Karate ===
Athlete	Event	Round of 32	Round of 16	Quarterfinal	Semifinal	Final	Rank
Hossein Rouhani	Men's 60 kg	El-Zein (LIB); W 5–0	Zolbayar (MGL); W WO	Dalloul (QAT); W 7–1	Nguyễn (VIE); W 7–4	Kunasilan (MAS); W 4–3	1st place, gold medalist(s)
Hassan Rouhani	Men's 65 kg	Hasaballah (SYR); W 6–3	Kutuev (UZB); W 5–4	Al-Najjar (JOR); W 3–0	Lim (MAS); W 2–2	Kayahara (JPN); W 8–7	1st place, gold medalist(s)
Saeid Farrokhi	Men's 70 kg	Rezayee (AFG); W 5–3	Hsu (TPE); W 4–2	Eid (BRN); W 4–2	Al-Hamwi (SYR); L 2–4	3rd place match Dalloul (QAT); W 5–2	3rd place, bronze medalist(s)
Jasem Vishkaei	Men's 75 kg	Huang (TPE); W 2–1	Shakya (NEP); W 9–0	Abumouamar (PLE); W 11–1	Kazhymukanov (KAZ); W 8–0	Matsuhisa (JPN); W 3–2	1st place, gold medalist(s)
Esmaeil Torkzad	Men's 80 kg	Al-Aaraj (QAT); W 1–1	Vũ (VIE); W 4–0	Kim (KOR); W 4–3	Muneer (KUW); L 4–5	3rd place match Salim (INA); W 7–1	3rd place, bronze medalist(s)

=== Rowing ===
Athlete	Event	Heat		Repechage		Semifinal		Final		Rank
Athlete	Event	Time	Rank	Time	Rank	Time	Rank	Time	Rank	Rank
Amin Gilanpour; Mahmoud Piltan; Arman Mokhtaba; Shahin Zareei	Men's coxless four	3:46.19	3	3:17.10	3 QC	Did not advance		Final C 3:33.80	3	11
Mahmoud Piltan	Men's lightweight single sculls	4:50.82	3	3:43.51	3 QC/D	Semifinal C/D; 3:36.91	3 QD	Final D 4:09.64	2	14
Mina Amini; Sahra Zolghadr; Minoo Zargari; Saba Shayesteh	Women's coxless four	5:50.60	4	5:01.56	4 QB	Did not advance		Final B 4:43.68	3	7

=== Sepak takraw ===
Athlete	Event	Preliminary round					Semifinal	Final	Rank
Athlete	Event	Round 1	Round 2	Round 3	Round 4	Rank	Semifinal	Final	Rank
Armin Farazmand; Majid Salmani; Jamil Kor	Men's doubles	Japan; L 0–2 (14–21, 8–21)	Indonesia; L 0–2 (9–21, 15–21)	Vietnam; L 1–2 (15–21, 21–17, 13–15)	Myanmar; L 0–2 (8–21, 11–21)	5	Did not advance		9
Armin Farazmand; Majid Salmani; Jamil Kor; Hamid Jafaripour	Men's regu	Myanmar; L 0–2 (7–21, 7–21)	India; L 0–2 (9–21, 9–21)	Philippines; L 0–2 (14–21, 13–21)	Malaysia; L 0–2 (7–21, 14–21)	5	Did not advance		9

=== Shooting ===
Athlete	Event	Qualification		Final			Team events			
Athlete	Event	Score	Rank	Score	Total	Rank	Athlete	Event	Score	Rank
Ebrahim Barkhordari	Men's 10 m air pistol	556	46	Did not advance			Ebrahim Barkhordari; Hossein Hosseini; Mohsen Nasr Esfahani	Men's 10 m air pistol team	1683	10
Hossein Hosseini	Men's 10 m air pistol	562	39	Did not advance			Ebrahim Barkhordari; Hossein Hosseini; Mohsen Nasr Esfahani	Men's 10 m air pistol team	1683	10
Mohsen Nasr Esfahani	Men's 10 m air pistol	565	32	Did not advance			Ebrahim Barkhordari; Hossein Hosseini; Mohsen Nasr Esfahani	Men's 10 m air pistol team	1683	10
Ebrahim Barkhordari	Men's 25 m center fire pistol	566	31	—N/a			Ebrahim Barkhordari; Hossein Hosseini; Mohsen Nasr Esfahani	Men's 25 m center fire pistol team	1658	13
Hossein Hosseini	Men's 25 m center fire pistol	512	47	—N/a			Ebrahim Barkhordari; Hossein Hosseini; Mohsen Nasr Esfahani	Men's 25 m center fire pistol team	1658	13
Mohsen Nasr Esfahani	Men's 25 m center fire pistol	580	7	—N/a			Ebrahim Barkhordari; Hossein Hosseini; Mohsen Nasr Esfahani	Men's 25 m center fire pistol team	1658	13
Ebrahim Barkhordari	Men's 50 m pistol	531	35	Did not advance			Ebrahim Barkhordari; Hossein Hosseini; Mohsen Nasr Esfahani	Men's 50 m pistol team	1573	11
Hossein Hosseini	Men's 50 m pistol	511	46	Did not advance			Ebrahim Barkhordari; Hossein Hosseini; Mohsen Nasr Esfahani	Men's 50 m pistol team	1573	11
Mohsen Nasr Esfahani	Men's 50 m pistol	531	36	Did not advance			Ebrahim Barkhordari; Hossein Hosseini; Mohsen Nasr Esfahani	Men's 50 m pistol team	1573	11
Amir Abri Lavasani	Men's trap	111	3 Q	14	125, +3 SO	4	—N/a			
Shokoufeh Akasheh	Women's 10 m air pistol	369	39	Did not advance			Shokoufeh Akasheh; Nasim Hassanpour; Marzieh Mehrabi	Women's 10 m air pistol team	1117	12
Nasim Hassanpour	Women's 10 m air pistol	379	13	Did not advance			Shokoufeh Akasheh; Nasim Hassanpour; Marzieh Mehrabi	Women's 10 m air pistol team	1117	12
Marzieh Mehrabi	Women's 10 m air pistol	369	40	Did not advance			Shokoufeh Akasheh; Nasim Hassanpour; Marzieh Mehrabi	Women's 10 m air pistol team	1117	12
Shokoufeh Akasheh	Women's 25 m pistol	499	49	Did not advance			Shokoufeh Akasheh; Nasim Hassanpour; Marzieh Mehrabi	Women's 25 m pistol team	1599	12
Nasim Hassanpour	Women's 25 m pistol	564	25	Did not advance			Shokoufeh Akasheh; Nasim Hassanpour; Marzieh Mehrabi	Women's 25 m pistol team	1599	12
Marzieh Mehrabi	Women's 25 m pistol	536	44	Did not advance			Shokoufeh Akasheh; Nasim Hassanpour; Marzieh Mehrabi	Women's 25 m pistol team	1599	12
Elaheh Ahmadi	Women's 10 m air rifle	390	23	Did not advance			—N/a			
Elaheh Ahmadi	Women's 50 m rifle prone	565	37	—N/a			—N/a			
Elaheh Ahmadi	Women's 50 m rifle 3 positions	567	23	Did not advance			—N/a			
Nahla Aboumansour	Women's trap	62	10	Did not advance			Nahla Aboumansour; Masoumeh Ameri; Sepideh Sirani	Women's trap team	166	7
Masoumeh Ameri	Women's trap	48	28	Did not advance			Nahla Aboumansour; Masoumeh Ameri; Sepideh Sirani	Women's trap team	166	7
Sepideh Sirani	Women's trap	56	19	Did not advance			Nahla Aboumansour; Masoumeh Ameri; Sepideh Sirani	Women's trap team	166	7

=== Taekwondo ===
Athlete	Event	Round of 32	Round of 16	Quarterfinal	Semifinal	Final	Rank
Behzad Khodadad	Men's 58 kg	Chaaya (LIB); W 5–2	Gomes (MAC); W 6–0	Al-Hurais (KUW); W 8–2	You (KOR); L 7–8	Did not advance	3rd place, bronze medalist(s)
Alireza Nasr Azadani	Men's 67 kg	Bye	Thanaroekchai (THA); W 1–0	Ahmedov (UZB); W WO	Song (KOR); L 4–5	Did not advance	3rd place, bronze medalist(s)
Hadi Saei	Men's 72 kg	Bye	Abulibdeh (JOR); W 4–2	Sung (TPE); W 4–3	Lee (KOR); L 1–3	Did not advance	3rd place, bronze medalist(s)
Mehdi Bibak	Men's 78 kg	—N/a	Chernov (UZB); W 11–7	Akkam (SYR); W 10–8	Liao (TPE); W 1–0	Hikmat (QAT); L 5–8	2nd place, silver medalist(s)
Yousef Karami	Men's 84 kg	—N/a	Rosandi (INA); W KO (2–0)	Liu (CHN); W 7–−1	Chilmanov (KAZ); W 5–1	Park (KOR); W 4–3	1st place, gold medalist(s)
Mehdi Navaei	Men's +84 kg	—N/a	Multazim (AFG); W 3–1	Kalimbetov (KAZ); W 1–0	Liu (CHN); W 3–1	Kim (KOR); L 0–2	2nd place, silver medalist(s)
Nazila Nezami	Women's 47 kg	Bye	Putri (INA); L 2–7	Did not advance			9
Sara Khoshjamal Fekri	Women's 51 kg	Chakar (LIB); W 6–1	Wang (CHN); W 3–2	Đỗ (VIE); L 1–3	Did not advance		5
Zeinab Heidari	Women's 55 kg	—N/a	Bye	Sardarova (KAZ); L 1–2	Did not advance		5
Marjan Tatlari	Women's 59 kg	—N/a	Nguyễn (VIE); L 1–2	Did not advance			9
Mahrouz Saei	Women's 72 kg	—N/a		Roxas (PHI); W 5–4	Kutkut (JOR); L 0–1	Did not advance	3rd place, bronze medalist(s)
Afsaneh Sheikhi	Women's +72 kg	—N/a		Prasopsuk (THA); W 2–1	Karimova (UZB); L 0–1	Did not advance	3rd place, bronze medalist(s)

=== Volleyball ===
Team	Event	Qualification round	Preliminary round	Quarterfinal	Semifinal	Final	Rank
Iran	Men	Bye		South Korea; L 1–3 (23–25, 25–23, 15–25, 18–25)	5th–8th places Bahrain; W 3–1 (25–19, 23–25, 25–23, 25–20)	5th place match Japan; L 2–3 (23–25, 25–23, 27–25, 22–25, 9–15)	6
Roster: Amir Hossein Monazzami; Mohammad Shariati; Amir Hosseini; Davoud Moghbeli; Peyman Akbari; Mohammad Mansouri; Farhad Zarif; Alireza Nadi; Behnam Mahmoudi; Mohammad Torkashvand; Mohammad Soleimani; Mohammad Mohammadkazem; Coach: (Serbia) Milorad Kijac

=== Weightlifting ===
Athlete	Event	Snatch		Clean & Jerk		Total	
Athlete	Event	Result	Rank	Result	Rank	Result	Rank
Hossein Rezazadeh	Men's +105 kg	195	1	230	1	425	1st place, gold medalist(s)

=== Wrestling ===
Freestyle

Athlete	Event	Round of 16	Quarterfinal	Semifinal	Final	Rank
Taghi Dadashi	Men's 55 kg	Turgunbayev (KAZ); W 2–0 (3–0, 3–0)	Kumar (IND); W 2–0 (2–1, 6–1)	Mansurov (UZB); L 1–2 (2–1, 0–6, 0–1)	3rd place match Taoka (JPN); L 1–2 (0–3, 1–0, 0–1)	5
Morad Mohammadi	Men's 60 kg	Al-Qubaisi (UAE); W 2–0 (7–0, 6–0)	Ri (PRK); W 2–1 (1–3, 6–0, 3–1)	Gao (CHN); W 2–0 (6–0, 2–1)	Song (KOR); W 2–0 (3–0, 3–0)	1st place, gold medalist(s)
Masoud Mostafa-Jokar	Men's 66 kg	Chab (CAM); W 2–0 (3–0, 5–0)	Batzorig (MGL); L 1–2 (3–1, 1–2, 4–4)	Did not advance		7
Ali Asghar Bazri	Men's 74 kg	Mendsaikhan (MGL); W 2–0 (2–0, 2–0)	Obata (JPN); W 2–0 (3–0, 3–0)	Tigiev (UZB); W 2–0 (1–0, 3–1)	Cho (KOR); W 2–0 (2–1, 1–0)	1st place, gold medalist(s)
Reza Yazdani	Men's 84 kg	Kurugliyev (KAZ); W 2–1 (1–0, 1–1, 4–0)	Chaudhary (IND); W 2–0 (1–0, 5–0)	Matsumoto (JPN); W 2–0 (8–3, 6–0)	Sokhiev (UZB); W 2–0 (3–1, 4–0)	1st place, gold medalist(s)
Alireza Heidari	Men's 96 kg	Tigiyev (KAZ); W 2–0 (3–1, 1–0)	Narender (IND); W 2–0 (3–0, 2–0)	Wang (CHN); W Fall (4–1, 2–0)	Kallagov (UZB); W 2–0 (2–0, 2–1)	1st place, gold medalist(s)
Fardin Masoumi	Men's 120 kg	Jabr (IRQ); W 2–0 (2–0, 3–0)	Cheema (IND); W 2–0 (3–1, 4–0)	Mutalimov (KAZ); W 2–0 (1–0, 3–1)	Taymazov (UZB); L 0–2 (0–8, 0–5)	2nd place, silver medalist(s)

Greco-Roman

Athlete	Event	Round of 16	Quarterfinal	Semifinal	Final	Rank
Jasem Amiri	Men's 55 kg	Najah (IRQ); W 2–1 (4–0, 2–3, 4–0)	Angana (PHI); W 2–0 (4–3, 6–0)	Cha (PRK); W 2–1 (2–1, 1–3, 1–1)	Jiao (CHN); L 1–2 (3–2, 1–1, 4–5)	2nd place, silver medalist(s)
Ali Ashkani	Men's 60 kg	Kang (KOR); L 0–2 (0–4, 1–2)	Did not advance			11
Hamid Reihani	Men's 66 kg	Al-Najjar (PLE); W Fall (7–0)	Abişew (TKM); W 2–0 (2–1, 7–1)	Kim (KOR); L 1–2 (7–0, 0–5, 1–1)	3rd place match Qiao (CHN); W 2–0 (5–0, 3–0)	3rd place, bronze medalist(s)
Davoud Abedinzadeh	Men's 74 kg	Gulgeldiýew (TKM); W 2–0 (4–0, 2–1)	Zdorikov (UZB); W 2–1 (1–1, 3–0, 1–1)	Kobonov (KGZ); W 2–1 (1–1, 0–7, 2–1)	Melyoshin (KAZ); L 0–2 (2–2, 1–5)	2nd place, silver medalist(s)
Saman Tahmasebi	Men's 84 kg	Kumar (IND); W 2–0 (4–0, 7–0)	Kenjeev (KGZ); L Fall (1–4, 4–1, 0–5)	Did not advance		9
Masoud Hashemzadeh	Men's 96 kg	Kumar (IND); W 2–0 (3–0, 5–0)	Al-Ken (SYR); W Fall (6–0)	Jiang (CHN); W 2–1 (4–0, 1–4, 1–1)	Han (KOR); L 0–2 (1–1, 0–3)	2nd place, silver medalist(s)
Mehdi Sharabiani	Men's 120 kg	Bye	Al-Batneeji (PLE); W 2–0 (2–1, 4–1)	Ibragimov (KGZ); W 2–0 (2–0, 2–0)	Kim (KOR); L 0–2 (1–1, 1–1)	2nd place, silver medalist(s)

=== Wushu ===
Taolu

Athlete	Event	Round 1			Round 2			Round 3			Total	Rank
Athlete	Event	Form	Score	Rank	Form	Score	Rank	Form	Score	Rank	Total	Rank
Ghaffar Amani	Men's changquan combined	Changquan	9.50	7	Daoshu	9.04	13	Gunshu	8.75	15	27.29	13
Farshad Arabi	Men's nanquan combined	Nanquan	9.30	10	Nandao	9.42	12	Nangun	9.61	10	28.33	11

Sanshou

Athlete	Event	Round of 32	Round of 16	Quarterfinal	Semifinal	Final	Rank
Ali Fathi	Men's 52 kg	—N/a	Chanthra (THA); L 1–2	Did not advance			9
Jalil Ataei	Men's 56 kg	—N/a	Abdullayev (KAZ); W 2–1	Hettiarachchi (SRI); W 2–0	Aphailath (LAO); L 0–2	Did not advance	3rd place, bronze medalist(s)
Alireza Sahraneshini	Men's 60 kg	Bye	Nguyễn (VIE); W 2–1	Masopha (LAO); W 2–0	Singh (IND); W 2–0	Ma (CHN); L 0–2	2nd place, silver medalist(s)
Saed Siahmoshtehei	Men's 65 kg	—N/a	Batjargal (MGL); W 2–0	Cai (MAC); L KO	Did not advance		5
Khosro Minoo	Men's 70 kg	—N/a	Singh (IND); W 2–0	Bu-Taibaan (KUW); W DSQ	Folayang (PHI); L 1–2	Did not advance	3rd place, bronze medalist(s)
