= Wushu at the 2006 Asian Games =

- Venue: Aspire Hall 3
- Dates: 11–14 December 2006
- Competitors: 168 from 29 nations

Wushu was contested by both men and women at the 2006 Asian Games in Doha, Qatar from December 11 to December 14, 2006. It was competed in the disciplines of Taijiquan, Taijijian, Changquan, Daoshu, Jianshu, Gunshu, Qiangshu, Nanquan, Nangun, Nandao, and Sanshou. All events were held at Aspire Hall 3.

== Schedule ==
●	Round	●	Last round	P	Round of 32	R	Round of 16	¼	Quarterfinals	½	Semifinals	F	Final

Event↓/Date →	11th Mon		12th Tue	13th Wed	14th Thu
Men's changquan combined	●		●		●
Men's nanquan combined	●			●	●
Men's taijiquan combined			●	●	
Men's sanshou 52 kg	R		¼	½	F
Men's sanshou 56 kg	R		¼	½	F
Men's sanshou 60 kg	P	R	¼	½	F
Men's sanshou 65 kg	R		¼	½	F
Men's sanshou 70 kg	R		¼	½	F
Women's changquan combined	●		●		●
Women's nanquan combined			●	●	●
Women's taijiquan combined	●			●	

== Medalists ==
=== Men's taolu ===
Event	Gold	Silver	Bronze
Changquan combined	Yuan Xiaochao; China	Jia Rui; Macau	Aung Si Thu; Myanmar
Nanquan combined	Wu Caibao; China	Phạm Quốc Khánh; Vietnam	Lee Seung-kuen; South Korea
Taijiquan combined	Wu Yanan; China	Hei Zhihong; Hong Kong	Goh Qiu Bin; Singapore

=== Men's sanshou ===
Event	Gold	Silver	Bronze
52 kg	Rene Catalan; Philippines	Phan Quốc Vinh; Vietnam	Naji Al-Ashwal; Yemen
52 kg	Rene Catalan; Philippines	Phan Quốc Vinh; Vietnam	Khwanyuen Chanthra; Thailand
56 kg	Li Teng; China	Phoxay Aphailath; Laos	Kim Jun-yul; South Korea
56 kg	Li Teng; China	Phoxay Aphailath; Laos	Jalil Ataei; Iran
60 kg	Ma Chao; China	Alireza Sahraneshini; Iran	Qin Zhi Jian; Macau
60 kg	Ma Chao; China	Alireza Sahraneshini; Iran	M. Bimoljit Singh; India
65 kg	Zhao Guangyong; China	Nguyễn Đức Trung; Vietnam	Cai Liang Chan; Macau
65 kg	Zhao Guangyong; China	Nguyễn Đức Trung; Vietnam	Maratab Ali Shah; Pakistan
70 kg	Xu Yanfei; China	Eduard Folayang; Philippines	Ahn Yong-woon; South Korea
70 kg	Xu Yanfei; China	Eduard Folayang; Philippines	Khosro Minoo; Iran

=== Women's taolu ===
Event	Gold	Silver	Bronze
Changquan combined	Ma Lingjuan; China	Susyana Tjhan; Indonesia	Han Jing; Macau
Nanquan combined	Mao Yaqi; China	Angie Tsang; Hong Kong	Diana Bong; Malaysia
Taijiquan combined	Chai Fong Ying; Malaysia	Ai Miyaoka; Japan	Ng Shin Yii; Malaysia

== Medal table ==
Rank	Nation	Gold	Silver	Bronze	Total
1	China (CHN)	9	0	0	9
2	Philippines (PHI)	1	1	0	2
3	Malaysia (MAS)	1	0	2	3
4	Vietnam (VIE)	0	3	0	3
5	Hong Kong (HKG)	0	2	0	2
6	Macau (MAC)	0	1	3	4
7	Iran (IRI)	0	1	2	3
8	Indonesia (INA)	0	1	0	1
8	Japan (JPN)	0	1	0	1
8	Laos (LAO)	0	1	0	1
11	South Korea (KOR)	0	0	3	3
12	India (IND)	0	0	1	1
12	Myanmar (MYA)	0	0	1	1
12	Pakistan (PAK)	0	0	1	1
12	Singapore (SIN)	0	0	1	1
12	Thailand (THA)	0	0	1	1
12	Yemen (YEM)	0	0	1	1
Totals (17 entries)		11	11	16	38

== Participating nations ==
A total of 168 athletes from 29 nations competed in wushu at the 2006 Asian Games:

- Afghanistan (2)
- China (9)
- Chinese Taipei (11)
- Hong Kong (9)
- India (7)
- Indonesia (3)
- Iran (7)
- Japan (6)
- Kazakhstan (6)
- Kuwait (1)
- Kyrgyzstan (9)
- Laos (3)
- Lebanon (5)
- Macau (11)
- Malaysia (6)
- Mongolia (3)
- Myanmar (4)
- Nepal (8)
- North Korea (1)
- Pakistan (3)
- Philippines (8)
- Singapore (7)
- South Korea (11)
- Sri Lanka (4)
- Syria (4)
- Thailand (5)
- Uzbekistan (4)
- Vietnam (8)
- Yemen (3)
