= Taekwondo at the 2006 Asian Games – Men's 67 kg =

Taekwondo competition

Men's 67 kg at the 2006 Asian Games
- Venue: Qatar SC Indoor Hall
- Date: 10 December 2006
- Competitors: 24 from 24 nations

Medalists
gold medal	Song Myeong-seob	South Korea
silver medal	Jamil Al-Khuffash	Jordan
bronze medal	Alireza Nasr Azadani	Iran
bronze medal	Manuel Rivero	Philippines

The men's featherweight (−67 kilograms) event at the 2006 Asian Games took place on 10 December 2006 at Qatar SC Indoor Hall, Doha, Qatar.

== Schedule ==
All times are Arabia Standard Time (UTC+03:00)

Date	Time	Event
Sunday, 10 December 2006	14:00	1/16 finals
Sunday, 10 December 2006	14:00	1/8 finals
Sunday, 10 December 2006	14:00	Quarterfinals
Sunday, 10 December 2006	14:00	Semifinals
Sunday, 10 December 2006	14:00	Final

== Results ==
Legend

- W — Won by withdrawal

=== Final ===
Final
Song Myeong-seob (KOR)	5
Jamil Al-Khuffash (JOR)	0

=== Top half ===
1/16 finals
Tashi Tashi (BHU)	−1
Daren Tubbs (CAM)	2
Sultan Al-Mutairi (KUW)	2
Chanatha Thanaroekchai (THA)	3
Marcel Saad (LIB)	−1
Song Myeong-seob (KOR)	4
Sawatvilay Phimmasone (LAO)	1
Tseng Ching-hsiang (TPE)	6

1/8 finals
Rashid Ahmedov (UZB)	3
Daren Tubbs (CAM)	2
Chanatha Thanaroekchai (THA)	0
Alireza Nasr Azadani (IRI)	1
Anas Aqlan (YEM)	0
Song Myeong-seob (KOR)	2
Tseng Ching-hsiang (TPE)	5
Lin Wai Tin (MAC)	0

Quarterfinals
Rashid Ahmedov (UZB)
Alireza Nasr Azadani (IRI)	W
Song Myeong-seob (KOR)	2
Tseng Ching-hsiang (TPE)	0

Semifinals
Alireza Nasr Azadani (IRI)	4
Song Myeong-seob (KOR)	5

=== Bottom half ===
1/16 finals
Nguyễn Minh Hiếu (VIE)	0
Abas Hussaini (AFG)	1
Hussam Al-Najm (SYR)	2
Ghali Al-Matrafi (KSA)	3
Taufik Krisna Nugraha (INA)	0
Jamil Al-Khuffash (JOR)	7
Khusrav Giyosov (TJK)	2
Abdulla Ahmed Thani (BRN)	3

1/8 finals
Manuel Rivero (PHI)	5
Abas Hussaini (AFG)	2
Ghali Al-Matrafi (KSA)	2
Rasul Abduraim (KGZ)	5
Yerlan Amanzhol (KAZ)	0
Jamil Al-Khuffash (JOR)	7
Abdulla Ahmed Thani (BRN)	1
Li Lai (CHN)	2

Quarterfinals
Manuel Rivero (PHI)	3
Rasul Abduraim (KGZ)	2
Jamil Al-Khuffash (JOR)	1
Li Lai (CHN)	1

Semifinals
Manuel Rivero (PHI)	0
Jamil Al-Khuffash (JOR)	2
