= Taekwondo at the 2006 Asian Games – Men's 72 kg =

Taekwondo competition

Men's 72 kg at the 2006 Asian Games
- Venue: Qatar SC Indoor Hall
- Date: 7 December 2006
- Competitors: 23 from 23 nations

Medalists
gold medal	Lee Young-yeoul	South Korea
silver medal	Wang Hao	China
bronze medal	Nesar Ahmad Bahave	Afghanistan
bronze medal	Hadi Saei	Iran

The men's lightweight (−72 kilograms) event at the 2006 Asian Games took place on 7 December 2006 at Qatar SC Indoor Hall, Doha, Qatar.

== Schedule ==
All times are Arabia Standard Time (UTC+03:00)

Date	Time	Event
Thursday, 7 December 2006	14:00	1/16 finals
Thursday, 7 December 2006	14:00	1/8 finals
Thursday, 7 December 2006	14:00	Quarterfinals
Thursday, 7 December 2006	14:00	Semifinals
Thursday, 7 December 2006	14:00	Final

== Results ==
=== Final ===
Final
Wang Hao (CHN)	0
Lee Young-Yeoul (KOR)	7

=== Top half ===
1/16 finals
Ramesh Kumar Shrestha (NEP)	0
Islomiddin Fazylov (TJK)	4
Pankaj Dheer (IND)	1
Vitaliy An (UZB)	4
Patiwat Thongsalap (THA)	5
Yesbol Sultanov (KAZ)	4

1/8 finals
Phimmasone Mangkheua (LAO)	8
Islomiddin Fazylov (TJK)	1
Deyaa Al-Dah (SYR)	1
Nesar Ahmad Bahave (AFG)	2
Wang Hao (CHN)	2
Vitaliy An (UZB)	1
Patiwat Thongsalap (THA)	6
Donald Geisler (PHI)	3

Quarterfinals
Phimmasone Mangkheua (LAO)	2
Nesar Ahmad Bahave (AFG)	4
Wang Hao (CHN)	1
Patiwat Thongsalap (THA)	0

Semifinals
Nesar Ahmad Bahave (AFG)	6
Wang Hao (CHN)	7

=== Bottom half ===
1/16 finals
Cao Trọng Chinh (VIE)	3
Sung Yu-chi (TPE)	9
Mohammad Abulibdeh (JOR)	8
Tashi Dukpa (BHU)	1
Hani Al-Matrafi (KSA)	4
Othman Boularas (QAT)	0
Lee Young-yeoul (KOR)	7
Waleed Farhan (KUW)	1

1/8 finals
Chhoy Po Thea (CAM)	1
Sung Yu-chi (TPE)	2
Mohammad Abulibdeh (JOR)	2
Hadi Saei (IRI)	4
Malek Aqlan (YEM)	−1
Hani Al-Matrafi (KSA)	0
Lee Young-yeoul (KOR)	4
Sami Matta (LIB)	0

Quarterfinals
Sung Yu-chi (TPE)	3
Hadi Saei (IRI)	4
Hani Al-Matrafi (KSA)	2
Lee Young-yeoul (KOR)	4

Semifinals
Hadi Saei (IRI)	1
Lee Young-yeoul (KOR)	3
