= Karate at the 2006 Asian Games – Men's kumite 70 kg =

Karate competition

Men's kumite 70 kg at the 2006 Asian Games
- Venue: Qatar SC Indoor Hall
- Date: 13 December 2006
- Competitors: 22 from 22 nations

Medalists
gold medal	Abdullah Al-Otaibi	Kuwait
silver medal	Naowras Al-Hamwi	Syria
bronze medal	Saeid Farrokhi	Iran
bronze medal	Takuro Nihei	Japan

The men's kumite 70 kilograms competition at the 2006 Asian Games in Doha, Qatar was held on 13 December 2006 at the Qatar SC Indoor Hall.

== Schedule ==
All times are Arabia Standard Time (UTC+03:00)

Date	Time	Event
Wednesday, 13 December 2006	13:00	1/16 finals
Wednesday, 13 December 2006	13:00	1/8 finals
Wednesday, 13 December 2006	13:00	Quarterfinals
Wednesday, 13 December 2006	13:00	Semifinals
Wednesday, 13 December 2006	13:00	Repechage 1R
Wednesday, 13 December 2006	13:00	Repechage 2R
Wednesday, 13 December 2006	13:00	Finals

== Results ==
=== Main bracket ===
==== Final ====
Final
Naowras Al-Hamwi (SYR)	4
Abdullah Al-Otaibi (KUW)	8

==== Top half ====
1/16 finals
Tarik Ammar (PLE)	1
Bùi Việt Bằng (VIE)	2
Bassam Eid (BRN)	6
Yahya Maydy (KSA)	2
Saeid Farrokhi (IRI)	5
Hussin Ali Rezayee (AFG)	3

1/8 finals
Naowras Al-Hamwi (SYR)	8
Badriddin Umedov (TJK)	1
Bùi Việt Bằng (VIE)	0
Abdulaziz Dalloul (QAT)	5
Fuad Al-Sharabi (YEM)	1
Bassam Eid (BRN)	5
Saeid Farrokhi (IRI)	4
Hsu Hsiang-ming (TPE)	2

Quarterfinals
Naowras Al-Hamwi (SYR)	3
Abdulaziz Dalloul (QAT)	2
Bassam Eid (BRN)	2
Saeid Farrokhi (IRI)	4

Semifinals
Naowras Al-Hamwi (SYR)	4
Saeid Farrokhi (IRI)	2

==== Bottom half ====
1/16 finals
Ali Younes (LIB)	1
Abdullah Al-Otaibi (KUW)	5
Mansoor Aziz (UAE)	1
Rustam Tashnazarov (UZB)	4
Yerzhan Kozhayev (KAZ)	6
Takuro Nihei (JPN)	7

1/8 finals
Junel Perania (PHI)	0
Abdullah Al-Otaibi (KUW)	8
Rustam Tashnazarov (UZB)	4
Abdul Raziq (PAK)	1
Gaspar Leong (MAC)	1
Takuro Nihei (JPN)	5
Asem Abujamous (JOR)	2
Mahendran Supremaniam (MAS)	3

Quarterfinals
Abdullah Al-Otaibi (KUW)	7
Rustam Tashnazarov (UZB)	5
Takuro Nihei (JPN)	3
Mahendran Supremaniam (MAS)	2

Semifinals
Abdullah Al-Otaibi (KUW)	8
Takuro Nihei (JPN)	3

=== Repechage ===
Repechage 1R
Junel Perania (PHI)	5
Ali Younes (LIB)	7

Repechage 2R
Abdulaziz Dalloul (QAT)	9
Badriddin Umedov (TJK)	0
Ali Younes (LIB)	4
Rustam Tashnazarov (UZB)	1

Final repechage
Saeid Farrokhi (IRI)	5
Abdulaziz Dalloul (QAT)	2
Ali Younes (LIB)	2
Takuro Nihei (JPN)	6
