= Wrestling at the 2006 Asian Games – Men's Greco-Roman 96 kg =

Men's Greco-Roman 96 kg at the 2006 Asian Games
- Venue: Aspire Hall 4
- Date: 9 December 2006
- Competitors: 12 from 12 nations

Medalists
gold medal	Han Tae-young	South Korea
silver medal	Davoud Abedinzadeh	Iran
bronze medal	Gennady Chkhaidze	Uzbekistan
bronze medal	Mohammad Al-Ken	Syria

The men's Greco-Roman 96 kilograms wrestling competition at the 2006 Asian Games in Doha was held on 9 December 2006 at the Aspire Hall 4.

This Greco-Roman wrestling competition consisted of a single-elimination tournament, with a repechage used to determine the winner of two bronze medals. The two finalists faced off for gold and silver medals. Each wrestler who lost to one of the two finalists moved into the repechage, culminating in a pair of bronze medal matches featuring the semifinal losers each facing the remaining repechage opponent from their half of the bracket.

Each bout consisted of up to three rounds, lasting two minutes apiece. The wrestler who scored more points in each round was the winner of that rounds; the bout finished when one wrestler had won two rounds (and thus the match).

== Schedule ==
All times are Arabia Standard Time (UTC+03:00)

Date	Time	Event
Saturday, 9 December 2006	09:00	Preliminary
Saturday, 9 December 2006	09:00	Quarterfinals
Saturday, 9 December 2006	09:00	Semifinals
Saturday, 9 December 2006	09:00	Repechages
Saturday, 9 December 2006	18:00	Finals

== Results ==
Legend

- F — Won by fall

=== Main bracket ===
Preliminary
Azamat Erkimbaev (KGZ)	0	4	0
Mohammad Al-Ken (SYR)	7	0	3
Masoud Hashemzadeh (IRI)	3	5
Anil Kumar (IND)	0	0
Margulan Assembekov (KAZ)	2	1
Jiang Huachen (CHN)	2	2
Muhammetmyrad Orazow (TKM)	0	2
Shodi Bakhromov (TJK)	3	7

Quarterfinals
Ali Nadhim (IRQ)	3	1
Nguyễn Văn Dực (VIE)	1	1
Han Tae-young (KOR)	2	2
Gennady Chkhaidze (UZB)	1	1
Mohammad Al-Ken (SYR)	0
Masoud Hashemzadeh (IRI)	6^{F}
Jiang Huachen (CHN)	7	6^{F}
Shodi Bakhromov (TJK)	2	0

Semifinals
Ali Nadhim (IRQ)	0	0
Han Tae-young (KOR)	6	4
Masoud Hashemzadeh (IRI)	4	1	1
Jiang Huachen (CHN)	0	4	1

Gold medal match
Han Tae-young (KOR)	1	3
Masoud Hashemzadeh (IRI)	1	0

=== Repechage ===
Repechage
Anil Kumar (IND)	0	0
Mohammad Al-Ken (SYR)	6	7^{F}

Bronze medal match
Gennady Chkhaidze (UZB)	2	3
Ali Nadhim (IRQ)	1	0
Mohammad Al-Ken (SYR)	4^{F}
Jiang Huachen (CHN)	0

== Final standing ==
Rank	Athlete
1st place, gold medalist(s)	Han Tae-young (KOR)
2nd place, silver medalist(s)	Masoud Hashemzadeh (IRI)
3rd place, bronze medalist(s)	Gennady Chkhaidze (UZB)
3rd place, bronze medalist(s)	Mohammad Al-Ken (SYR)
5	Ali Nadhim (IRQ)
5	Jiang Huachen (CHN)
7	Shodi Bakhromov (TJK)
8	Azamat Erkimbaev (KGZ)
9	Margulan Assembekov (KAZ)
10	Nguyễn Văn Dực (VIE)
11	Muhammetmyrad Orazow (TKM)
12	Anil Kumar (IND)
