= Karate at the 2006 Asian Games – Men's kumite 75 kg =

Karate competition

Men's kumite 75 kg at the 2006 Asian Games
- Venue: Qatar SC Indoor Hall
- Date: 13 December 2006
- Competitors: 20 from 20 nations

Medalists
gold medal	Jasem Vishkaei	Iran
silver medal	Ko Matsuhisa	Japan
bronze medal	Shattyk Kazhymukanov	Kazakhstan
bronze medal	Talat Khalil	Jordan

The men's kumite 75 kilograms competition at the 2006 Asian Games in Doha, Qatar was held on 13 December 2006 at the Qatar SC Indoor Hall.

== Schedule ==
All times are Arabia Standard Time (UTC+03:00)

Date	Time	Event
Wednesday, 13 December 2006	13:00	1/16 finals
Wednesday, 13 December 2006	13:00	1/8 finals
Wednesday, 13 December 2006	13:00	Quarterfinals
Wednesday, 13 December 2006	13:00	Semifinals
Wednesday, 13 December 2006	13:00	Repechage 1R
Wednesday, 13 December 2006	13:00	Repechage 2R
Wednesday, 13 December 2006	13:00	Finals

== Results ==
=== Main bracket ===
==== Final ====
Final
Jasem Vishkaei (IRI)	3
Ko Matsuhisa (JPN)	2

==== Top half ====
1/16 finals
Khaled Abobaker (YEM)	1
Saher Al-Shabib (BRN)	2
Jasem Vishkaei (IRI)	2
Huang Hao-yun (TPE)	1

1/8 finals
Namsrain Chinzorig (MGL)	0
Shattyk Kazhymukanov (KAZ)	7
Saher Al-Shabib (BRN)	2
Mohammad Fedaee (AFG)	5
Binod Shakya (NEP)	0
Jasem Vishkaei (IRI)	9
Fayez Abumouamar (PLE)	5
Hassan Yazbeck (LIB)	4

Quarterfinals
Shattyk Kazhymukanov (KAZ)	2
Mohammad Fedaee (AFG)	0
Jasem Vishkaei (IRI)	11
Fayez Abumouamar (PLE)	1

Semifinals
Shattyk Kazhymukanov (KAZ)	0
Jasem Vishkaei (IRI)	8

==== Bottom half ====
1/16 finals
Md Fazil Rewandie (BRU)	0
Hussein Samir Jumaa (UAE)	8
Ammar Al-Sabsabi (SYR)	3
Christo Mondolu (INA)	5

1/8 finals
Chamal Suranga Silva (SRI)	0
Timur Bekov (TJK)	6
Hussein Samir Jumaa (UAE)	0
Ko Matsuhisa (JPN)	5
Jin Min-kyu (KOR)	3
Christo Mondolu (INA)	11
Talat Khalil (JOR)	4
Wesam Ghulam (KSA)	1

Quarterfinals
Timur Bekov (TJK)	2
Ko Matsuhisa (JPN)	10
Christo Mondolu (INA)	0
Talat Khalil (JOR)	4

Semifinals
Ko Matsuhisa (JPN)	9
Talat Khalil (JOR)	5

=== Repechage ===
Repechage 1R
Huang Hao-yun (TPE)	3
Binod Shakya (NEP)	1

Repechage 2R
Fayez Abumouamar (PLE)	1
Huang Hao-yun (TPE)	9
Hussein Samir Jumaa (UAE)	4
Timur Bekov (TJK)	3

Final repechage
Shattyk Kazhymukanov (KAZ)	5
Huang Hao-yun (TPE)	2
Hussein Samir Jumaa (UAE)	2
Talat Khalil (JOR)	4
