= Wrestling at the 2006 Asian Games – Men's freestyle 60 kg =

Men's freestyle 60 kg at the 2006 Asian Games
- Venue: Aspire Hall 4
- Date: 13 December 2006
- Competitors: 15 from 15 nations

Medalists
gold medal	Morad Mohammadi	Iran
silver medal	Song Jae-myung	South Korea
bronze medal	Yogeshwar Dutt	India
bronze medal	Ri Yong-chol	North Korea

The men's freestyle 60 kilograms wrestling competition at the 2006 Asian Games in Doha was held on 13 December 2006 at the Aspire Hall 4.

This freestyle wrestling competition consisted of a single-elimination tournament, with a repechage used to determine the winner of two bronze medals. The two finalists faced off for gold and silver medals. Each wrestler who lost to one of the two finalists moved into the repechage, culminating in a pair of bronze medal matches featuring the semifinal losers each facing the remaining repechage opponent from their half of the bracket.

Each bout consisted of up to three rounds, lasting two minutes apiece. The wrestler who scored more points in each round was the winner of that rounds; the bout finished when one wrestler had won two rounds (and thus the match).

== Schedule ==
All times are Arabia Standard Time (UTC+03:00)

Date	Time	Event
Wednesday, 13 December 2006	09:00	Preliminary
Wednesday, 13 December 2006	09:00	Quarterfinals
Wednesday, 13 December 2006	09:00	Semifinals
Wednesday, 13 December 2006	09:00	Repechages
Wednesday, 13 December 2006	18:00	Finals

== Results ==
=== Main bracket ===
Preliminary
Song Jae-myung (KOR)	3	4
Abdulqader Omar (QAT)	0	0
Dustmurod Kakhorov (TJK)	0	0
Ramazan Kambarow (TKM)	2	8
Bauyrzhan Orazgaliyev (KAZ)	1	3
Ali Mohammed (IRQ)	0	0
Ghazwan Lazkani (SYR)	1	1	3
Damir Zakhartdinov (UZB)	2	0	2
Gao Feng (CHN)	2	1
Maksat Djakshylykov (KGZ)	2	0
Saeed Al-Qubaisi (UAE)	0	0
Morad Mohammadi (IRI)	7	6
Noriyuki Takatsuka (JPN)	0	4	0
Ri Yong-chol (PRK)	1	1	1

Quarterfinals
Yogeshwar Dutt (IND)	0	1	0
Song Jae-myung (KOR)	1	0	1
Ramazan Kambarow (TKM)	0	0
Bauyrzhan Orazgaliyev (KAZ)	1	1
Ghazwan Lazkani (SYR)	0	3
Gao Feng (CHN)	2	8
Morad Mohammadi (IRI)	1	6	3
Ri Yong-chol (PRK)	3	0	1

Semifinals
Song Jae-myung (KOR)	0	1	2
Bauyrzhan Orazgaliyev (KAZ)	2	0	0
Gao Feng (CHN)	0	1
Morad Mohammadi (IRI)	6	2

Gold medal match
Song Jae-myung (KOR)	0	0
Morad Mohammadi (IRI)	3	3

=== Repechage ===
Repechage
Abdulqader Omar (QAT)	0	0
Yogeshwar Dutt (IND)	5	3
Saeed Al-Qubaisi (UAE)	0	0
Ri Yong-chol (PRK)	3	7

Bronze medal match
Yogeshwar Dutt (IND)	1	0	4
Bauyrzhan Orazgaliyev (KAZ)	1	1	2
Ri Yong-chol (PRK)	2	2
Gao Feng (CHN)	0	1

== Final standing ==
Rank	Athlete
1st place, gold medalist(s)	Morad Mohammadi (IRI)
2nd place, silver medalist(s)	Song Jae-myung (KOR)
3rd place, bronze medalist(s)	Yogeshwar Dutt (IND)
3rd place, bronze medalist(s)	Ri Yong-chol (PRK)
5	Bauyrzhan Orazgaliyev (KAZ)
5	Gao Feng (CHN)
7	Ghazwan Lazkani (SYR)
8	Ramazan Kambarow (TKM)
9	Noriyuki Takatsuka (JPN)
10	Damir Zakhartdinov (UZB)
11	Maksat Djakshylykov (KGZ)
12	Ali Mohammed (IRQ)
13	Dustmurod Kakhorov (TJK)
14	Abdulqader Omar (QAT)
15	Saeed Al-Qubaisi (UAE)
