= Wushu at the 2006 Asian Games – Men's sanshou 60 kg =

Men's sanshou 60 kg at the 2006 Asian Games
- Venue: Aspire Hall 3
- Dates: 11–14 December 2006
- Competitors: 18 from 18 nations

Medalists
gold medal	Ma Chao	China
silver medal	Alireza Sahraneshini	Iran
bronze medal	Qin Zhi Jian	Macau
bronze medal	M. Bimoljit Singh	India

The men's sanshou 60 kilograms at the 2006 Asian Games in Doha, Qatar was held from 11 to 14 December at the Aspire Hall 3 in Aspire Zone.

== Schedule ==
All times are Arabia Standard Time (UTC+03:00)

Date	Time	Event
Monday, 11 December 2006	15:30	Preliminary 1
Monday, 11 December 2006	15:30	Preliminary 2
Tuesday, 12 December 2006	14:00	Quarterfinals
Wednesday, 13 December 2006	16:00	Semifinals
Thursday, 14 December 2006	15:00	Final

== Results ==
Legend

- KO — Won by knockout

=== Final ===
Final
Ma Chao (CHN)	2
Alireza Sahraneshini (IRI)	0

=== Top half ===
Preliminary 1
Rustam Magdiev (UZB)	2
Hamzeh Al-Atiki (SYR)	0

Preliminary 2
Satya Man Lama (NEP)
Rustam Magdiev (UZB)	KO
Joseph Kamel (LIB)	0
Ma Chao (CHN)	2
Yoo Jung-sun (KOR)	2
Erdenechuluuny Buyanbat (MGL)	0
Ruangchai Srakao (THA)	0
Qin Zhi Jian (MAC)	2

Quarterfinals
Rustam Magdiev (UZB)	0
Ma Chao (CHN)	2
Yoo Jung-sun (KOR)	0
Qin Zhi Jian (MAC)	2

Semifinals
Ma Chao (CHN)	2
Qin Zhi Jian (MAC)	0

=== Bottom half ===
Preliminary 1
Aleksey Fedoseev (KGZ)	0
Mark Eddiva (PHI)	2

Preliminary 2
Amirshah Amiri (AFG)	0
Won To-song (PRK)	2
M. Bimoljit Singh (IND)	2
Medet Abzhanov (KAZ)	0
Nguyễn Văn Tuấn (VIE)	1
Alireza Sahraneshini (IRI)	2
Mark Eddiva (PHI)	1
Langsanh Masopha (LAO)	2

Quarterfinals
Won To-song (PRK)	1
M. Bimoljit Singh (IND)	2
Alireza Sahraneshini (IRI)	2
Langsanh Masopha (LAO)	0

Semifinals
M. Bimoljit Singh (IND)	0
Alireza Sahraneshini (IRI)	2
