= Boxing at the 2006 Asian Games – Men's 69 kg =

Boxing competitions

Men's 69 kg at the 2006 Asian Games
- Venue: Aspire Hall 5
- Date: 2–13 December 2006
- Competitors: 19 from 19 nations

Medalists
gold medal	Bakhyt Sarsekbayev	Kazakhstan
silver medal	Angkhan Chomphuphuang	Thailand
bronze medal	Hanati Silamu	China
bronze medal	Mohammad Sattarpour	Iran

The men's welterweight (69 kilograms) event at the 2006 Asian Games took place from 2 to 13 December 2006 at Aspire Hall 5, Doha, Qatar.

== Schedule ==
All times are Arabia Standard Time (UTC+03:00)

Date	Time	Event
Saturday, 2 December 2006	14:00	Qualification
Wednesday, 6 December 2006	14:00	Preliminary
Saturday, 9 December 2006	14:00	Quarterfinals
Monday, 11 December 2006	14:00	Semifinals
Wednesday, 13 December 2006	14:00	Final

== Results ==
Legend

- RSC — Won by referee stop contest
- RSCH — Won by referee stop contest head blow
- RSCO — Won by referee stop contest outscored

=== Final ===
Final
Bakhyt Sarsekbayev (KAZ)	RSCO
Angkhan Chomphuphuang (THA)

=== Top half ===
Qualification

Preliminary
Cao Văn Trưởng (VIE)	22
Behzodbek Yunusov (UZB)	49
Dilbag Singh (IND)
Hanati Silamu (CHN)	RSCO
Eshak Waez (SYR)	3
Bakhyt Sarsekbayev (KAZ)	24
Aliasker Başirow (TKM)	RSCO
Dur Muhammad Baloch (PAK)

Quarterfinals
Behzodbek Yunusov (UZB)	26
Hanati Silamu (CHN)	49
Bakhyt Sarsekbayev (KAZ)	34
Aliasker Başirow (TKM)	11

Semifinals
Hanati Silamu (CHN)	30
Bakhyt Sarsekbayev (KAZ)	37

=== Bottom half ===
Qualification
Kim Jung-joo (KOR)	16
Angkhan Chomphuphuang (THA)	22
Sherali Mamadaliev (TJK)	RSCH
Abdulaziz Al-Yaaqoubi (UAE)
Tömörkhuyagiin Chuluuntömör (MGL)	24
Hakan Nuraydin (QAT)	13

Preliminary
Mohammad Sattarpour (IRI)	28
Samantha Kumara (SRI)	19
Yoshiyuki Hirano (JPN)	+19
Ruslan Karipov (KGZ)	19
Francis Joven (PHI)
Angkhan Chomphuphuang (THA)	RSC
Sherali Mamadaliev (TJK)	RSCO
Tömörkhuyagiin Chuluuntömör (MGL)

Quarterfinals
Mohammad Sattarpour (IRI)	27
Yoshiyuki Hirano (JPN)	15
Angkhan Chomphuphuang (THA)	29
Sherali Mamadaliev (TJK)	21

Semifinals
Mohammad Sattarpour (IRI)	18
Angkhan Chomphuphuang (THA)	36
