= Wrestling at the 2006 Asian Games – Men's freestyle 96 kg =

Men's freestyle 96 kg at the 2006 Asian Games
- Venue: Aspire Hall 4
- Date: 13 December 2006
- Competitors: 14 from 14 nations

Medalists
gold medal	Alireza Heidari	Iran
silver medal	Oleg Kallagov	Uzbekistan
bronze medal	Aleksey Krupnyakov	Kyrgyzstan
bronze medal	Taimuraz Tigiyev	Kazakhstan

The men's freestyle 96 kilograms wrestling competition at the 2006 Asian Games in Doha was held on 13 December 2006 at the Aspire Hall 4.

This freestyle wrestling competition consisted of a single-elimination tournament, with a repechage used to determine the winner of two bronze medals. The two finalists faced off for gold and silver medals. Each wrestler who lost to one of the two finalists moved into the repechage, culminating in a pair of bronze medal matches featuring the semifinal losers each facing the remaining repechage opponent from their half of the bracket.

Each bout consisted of up to three rounds, lasting two minutes apiece. The wrestler who scored more points in each round was the winner of that rounds; the bout finished when one wrestler had won two rounds (and thus the match).

== Schedule ==
All times are Arabia Standard Time (UTC+03:00)

Date	Time	Event
Wednesday, 13 December 2006	09:00	Preliminary
Wednesday, 13 December 2006	09:00	Quarterfinals
Wednesday, 13 December 2006	09:00	Semifinals
Wednesday, 13 December 2006	09:00	Repechages
Wednesday, 13 December 2006	18:00	Finals

== Results ==
Legend

- F — Won by fall

=== Main bracket ===
Preliminary
Hà Văn Hiếu (VIE)	0
Oleg Kallagov (UZB)	4^{F}
Koo Tae-hyun (KOR)	1	1
Raja Al-Karrad (SYR)	1	0
Alireza Heidari (IRI)	3	1
Taimuraz Tigiyev (KAZ)	1	0
Narender (IND)	3	6
Ahmad Shah Ahmadi (AFG)	0	0
Husniddin Mallaev (TJK)	0	0
Wang Yuanyuan (CHN)	4	3
Jargalsaikhany Chuluunbat (MGL)	2	0	3
Hani Al-Marafi (JOR)	0	2	0

Quarterfinals
Farkad Bassam (IRQ)	0	0
Aleksey Krupnyakov (KGZ)	6	5^{F}
Oleg Kallagov (UZB)	4	2
Koo Tae-hyun (KOR)	0	0
Alireza Heidari (IRI)	3	2
Narender (IND)	0	0
Wang Yuanyuan (CHN)	5	1	3
Jargalsaikhany Chuluunbat (MGL)	2	1	0

Semifinals
Aleksey Krupnyakov (KGZ)	1	1	0
Oleg Kallagov (UZB)	0	3	1
Alireza Heidari (IRI)	4	2^{F}
Wang Yuanyuan (CHN)	1	0

Gold medal match
Oleg Kallagov (UZB)	0	1
Alireza Heidari (IRI)	2	2

=== Repechage ===
Repechage
Hà Văn Hiếu (VIE)	0	0
Koo Tae-hyun (KOR)	1	6
Taimuraz Tigiyev (KAZ)	6	4
Narender (IND)	0	0

Bronze medal match
Koo Tae-hyun (KOR)	0	0
Aleksey Krupnyakov (KGZ)	2	3
Taimuraz Tigiyev (KAZ)	3	3
Wang Yuanyuan (CHN)	1	1

== Final standing ==
Rank	Athlete
1st place, gold medalist(s)	Alireza Heidari (IRI)
2nd place, silver medalist(s)	Oleg Kallagov (UZB)
3rd place, bronze medalist(s)	Aleksey Krupnyakov (KGZ)
3rd place, bronze medalist(s)	Taimuraz Tigiyev (KAZ)
5	Koo Tae-hyun (KOR)
5	Wang Yuanyuan (CHN)
7	Jargalsaikhany Chuluunbat (MGL)
8	Narender (IND)
9	Hani Al-Marafi (JOR)
10	Raja Al-Karrad (SYR)
11	Husniddin Mallaev (TJK)
12	Ahmad Shah Ahmadi (AFG)
13	Farkad Bassam (IRQ)
13	Hà Văn Hiếu (VIE)
