= Karate at the 2006 Asian Games – Men's kumite 60 kg =

Karate competition

Men's kumite 60 kg at the 2006 Asian Games
- Venue: Qatar SC Indoor Hall
- Date: 12 December 2006
- Competitors: 19 from 19 nations

Medalists
gold medal	Hossein Rouhani	Iran
silver medal	Kunasilan Lakanathan	Malaysia
bronze medal	Huang Hsiang-chen	Chinese Taipei
bronze medal	Abdullah Dalloul	Qatar

The men's kumite 60 kilograms competition at the 2006 Asian Games in Doha, Qatar was held on 12 December 2006 at the Qatar SC Indoor Hall.

== Schedule ==
All times are Arabia Standard Time (UTC+03:00)

Date	Time	Event
Tuesday, 12 December 2006	14:00	1/16 finals
Tuesday, 12 December 2006	14:00	1/8 finals
Tuesday, 12 December 2006	14:00	Quarterfinals
Tuesday, 12 December 2006	14:00	Semifinals
Tuesday, 12 December 2006	14:00	Repechage 1R
Tuesday, 12 December 2006	14:00	Repechage 2R
Tuesday, 12 December 2006	14:00	Finals

== Results ==
Legend

- H — Won by hansoku
- K — Won by kiken (8–0)

=== Main bracket ===
==== Final ====
Final
Kunasilan Lakanathan (MAS)	3
Hossein Rouhani (IRI)	4

==== Top half ====
1/16 finals
Karem Othman (SYR)	8
Tong Wai Kit (MAC)	0

1/8 finals
Mohammed Khamees (UAE)	4
Park Sang-ho (KOR)	4
Kunasilan Lakanathan (MAS)	5
Deepak Shrestha (NEP)	4
Huang Hsiang-chen (TPE)	4
Karem Othman (SYR)	1
Jawad Hussaini (AFG)	4^{H}
Kim Ju-song (PRK)	0

Quarterfinals
Park Sang-ho (KOR)	1
Kunasilan Lakanathan (MAS)	10
Huang Hsiang-chen (TPE)	7
Jawad Hussaini (AFG)	0

Semifinals
Kunasilan Lakanathan (MAS)	5
Huang Hsiang-chen (TPE)	1

==== Bottom half ====
1/16 finals
Shaukat Ali (PAK)	0
Nguyễn Ngọc Thành (VIE)	1
Hossein Rouhani (IRI)	5
Samer El-Zein (LIB)	0

1/8 finals
Maher Salem (YEM)	3
Dilovar Sharipov (TJK)	4
Nguyễn Ngọc Thành (VIE)	3
Hussain Al-Qattan (KUW)	3
Myagmarjavyn Zolbayar (MGL)
Hossein Rouhani (IRI)	K
Abdullah Dalloul (QAT)	6
Bernardino Chu (PHI)	0

Quarterfinals
Dilovar Sharipov (TJK)	2
Nguyễn Ngọc Thành (VIE)	6
Hossein Rouhani (IRI)	7
Abdullah Dalloul (QAT)	1

Semifinals
Nguyễn Ngọc Thành (VIE)	4
Hossein Rouhani (IRI)	7

=== Repechage ===
Repechage 1R
Myagmarjavyn Zolbayar (MGL)
Samer El-Zein (LIB)	K

Repechage 2R
Park Sang-ho (KOR)	5
Deepak Shrestha (NEP)	8
Samer El-Zein (LIB)	1
Abdullah Dalloul (QAT)	9

Final repechage
Huang Hsiang-chen (TPE)	7
Deepak Shrestha (NEP)	5
Abdullah Dalloul (QAT)	6
Nguyễn Ngọc Thành (VIE)	2
