= Wrestling at the 2006 Asian Games – Men's Greco-Roman 66 kg =

Men's Greco-Roman 66 kg at the 2006 Asian Games
- Venue: Aspire Hall 4
- Date: 10 December 2006
- Competitors: 16 from 16 nations

Medalists
| gold medal | Kim Min-chul | South Korea |
| silver medal | Ravshan Ruzikulov | Uzbekistan |
| bronze medal | Hamid Reihani | Iran |
| bronze medal | Masaki Imuro | Japan |

The men's Greco-Roman 66 kilograms wrestling competition at the 2006 Asian Games in Doha was held on 10 December 2006 at the Aspire Hall 4.

This Greco-Roman wrestling competition consisted of a single-elimination tournament, with a repechage used to determine the winner of two bronze medals. The two finalists faced off for gold and silver medals. Each wrestler who lost to one of the two finalists moved into the repechage, culminating in a pair of bronze medal matches featuring the semifinal losers each facing the remaining repechage opponent from their half of the bracket.

Each bout consisted of up to three rounds, lasting two minutes apiece. The wrestler who scored more points in each round was the winner of that rounds; the bout finished when one wrestler had won two rounds (and thus the match).

== Schedule ==
All times are Arabia Standard Time (UTC+03:00)

| Date | Time | Event |
|---|---|---|
| Sunday, 10 December 2006 | 09:00 | Preliminary |
| Sunday, 10 December 2006 | 09:00 | Quarterfinals |
| Sunday, 10 December 2006 | 09:00 | Semifinals |
| Sunday, 10 December 2006 | 09:00 | Repechages |
| Sunday, 10 December 2006 | 18:00 | Finals |

== Results ==
Legend

- F — Won by fall

=== Main bracket ===
Preliminary
Qiao Huameng (CHN) | 0 | 3 | 0
Kim Min-chul (KOR) | 2 | 0 | 3
Kanatbek Begaliev (KGZ) | 7 | 7
Mohammad Al-Faoure (SYR) | 0 | 0
Maher Al-Barqawi (KSA) | 0 | 0
Temirlan Abişew (TKM) | 6 | 6
Mohammed Al-Najjar (PLE) | 0
Hamid Reihani (IRI) | 7^{F}
Ravshan Ruzikulov (UZB) | 5 | 6^{F}
Jafar Khan (QAT) | 0 | 0
Masaki Imuro (JPN) | 3^{F}
Ibrahim Hasan (IRQ) | 0
Amer El-Jeneidi (LIB) | 0 | 1
Shripati Patil (IND) | 8 | 6
Aibek Yensekhanov (KAZ) | 3 | 2
Kim Kum-chol (PRK) | 2 | 0

Quarterfinals
Kim Min-chul (KOR) | 0 | 2 | 3
Kanatbek Begaliev (KGZ) | 3 | 0 | 0
Temirlan Abişew (TKM) | 1 | 1
Hamid Reihani (IRI) | 2 | 7
Ravshan Ruzikulov (UZB) | 6 | 1
Masaki Imuro (JPN) | 0 | 1
Shripati Patil (IND) | 0 | 1
Aibek Yensekhanov (KAZ) | 4 | 4

Semifinals
Kim Min-chul (KOR) | 0 | 5 | 1
Hamid Reihani (IRI) | 7 | 0 | 1
Ravshan Ruzikulov (UZB) | 4 | 3
Aibek Yensekhanov (KAZ) | 0 | 1

Gold medal match
Kim Min-chul (KOR) | 2 | 0 | 1
Ravshan Ruzikulov (UZB) | 0 | 3 | 1

=== Repechage ===
Repechage
Qiao Huameng (CHN) | 0 | 4 | 1
Kanatbek Begaliev (KGZ) | 4 | 0 | 1
Jafar Khan (QAT) | 0
Masaki Imuro (JPN) | 5^{F}

Bronze medal match
Qiao Huameng (CHN) | 0 | 0
Hamid Reihani (IRI) | 5 | 3
Masaki Imuro (JPN) | 0 | 2 | 3
Aibek Yensekhanov (KAZ) | 3 | 1 | 0

== Final standing ==
| Rank | Athlete |
|---|---|
| 1st place, gold medalist(s) | Kim Min-chul (KOR) |
| 2nd place, silver medalist(s) | Ravshan Ruzikulov (UZB) |
| 3rd place, bronze medalist(s) | Hamid Reihani (IRI) |
| 3rd place, bronze medalist(s) | Masaki Imuro (JPN) |
| 5 | Qiao Huameng (CHN) |
| 5 | Aibek Yensekhanov (KAZ) |
| 7 | Kanatbek Begaliev (KGZ) |
| 8 | Temirlan Abişew (TKM) |
| 9 | Shripati Patil (IND) |
| 10 | Kim Kum-chol (PRK) |
| 11 | Amer El-Jeneidi (LIB) |
| 12 | Ibrahim Hasan (IRQ) |
| 13 | Mohammed Al-Najjar (PLE) |
| 14 | Maher Al-Barqawi (KSA) |
| 15 | Mohammad Al-Faoure (SYR) |
| 16 | Jafar Khan (QAT) |
