= Boxing at the 2006 Asian Games – Men's 91 kg =

Boxing competitions

Men's 91 kg at the 2006 Asian Games
- Venue: Aspire Hall 5
- Date: 5–12 December 2006
- Competitors: 13 from 13 nations

Medalists
gold medal	Ali Mazaheri	Iran
silver medal	Jasur Matchanov	Uzbekistan
bronze medal	Dmitriy Gotfrid	Kazakhstan
bronze medal	Nasser Al-Shami	Syria

The men's heavyweight (91 kilograms) event at the 2006 Asian Games took place from 5 to 12 December 2006 at Aspire Hall 5, Doha, Qatar.

== Schedule ==
All times are Arabia Standard Time (UTC+03:00)

Date	Time	Event
Tuesday, 5 December 2006	14:00	Preliminary
Friday, 8 December 2006	14:00	Quarterfinals
Sunday, 10 December 2006	14:00	Semifinals
Tuesday, 12 December 2006	14:00	Final

== Results ==
Legend

- RSCI — Won by referee stop contest injury
- RSCO — Won by referee stop contest outscored
- WO — Won by walkover

Preliminary
Konstantin Makrausov (TJK)
Ali Mazaheri (IRI)	RSCO
Harpreet Singh (IND)	25
Tsai Li-teh (TPE)	13
Nasser Al-Shami (SYR)	RSCO
Hứa Đức Trọng (VIE)
Jasur Matchanov (UZB)	17
Li Bin (CHN)	5
Jeon Byeong-gook (KOR)	23
Khaled Abdulrahman (QAT)	19

Quarterfinals
Dmitriy Gotfrid (KAZ)	RSCO
Ali Khalil (IRQ)
Bekzod Turgunov (KGZ)
Ali Mazaheri (IRI)	RSCI
Harpreet Singh (IND)	22
Nasser Al-Shami (SYR)	40
Jasur Matchanov (UZB)	33
Jeon Byeong-gook (KOR)	17

Semifinals
Dmitriy Gotfrid (KAZ)	24
Ali Mazaheri (IRI)	26
Nasser Al-Shami (SYR)
Jasur Matchanov (UZB)	WO

Final
Ali Mazaheri (IRI)	25
Jasur Matchanov (UZB)	19
