= Wrestling at the 2006 Asian Games – Men's freestyle 55 kg =

Men's freestyle 55 kg at the 2006 Asian Games
- Venue: Aspire Hall 4
- Date: 14 December 2006
- Competitors: 15 from 15 nations

Medalists
gold medal	Dilshod Mansurov	Uzbekistan
silver medal	Jon Hyon-guk	North Korea
bronze medal	Kim Hyo-sub	South Korea
bronze medal	Hidenori Taoka	Japan

The men's freestyle 55 kilograms wrestling competition at the 2006 Asian Games in Doha was held on 14 December 2006 at the Aspire Hall 4.

This freestyle wrestling competition consisted of a single-elimination tournament, with a repechage used to determine the winner of two bronze medals. The two finalists faced off for gold and silver medals. Each wrestler who lost to one of the two finalists moved into the repechage, culminating in a pair of bronze medal matches featuring the semifinal losers each facing the remaining repechage opponent from their half of the bracket.

Each bout consisted of up to three rounds, lasting two minutes apiece. The wrestler who scored more points in each round was the winner of that rounds; the bout finished when one wrestler had won two rounds (and thus the match).

== Schedule ==
All times are Arabia Standard Time (UTC+03:00)

Date	Time	Event
Thursday, 14 December 2006	09:00	Preliminary
Thursday, 14 December 2006	09:00	Quarterfinals
Thursday, 14 December 2006	09:00	Semifinals
Thursday, 14 December 2006	09:00	Repechages
Thursday, 14 December 2006	18:00	Finals

== Results ==
Legend

- F — Won by fall

=== Main bracket ===
Preliminary
Nurlan Turarbek Uulu (KGZ)	2	0
Kim Hyo-sub (KOR)	7	1
Bayaraagiin Naranbaatar (MGL)	1	3
Firas Al-Rifaei (SYR)	0	1
Ramil Rejepow (TKM)	0	0
Jon Hyon-guk (PRK)	1	6
Hussain Gowdooei (QAT)	0	0
Hidenori Taoka (JPN)	2	6
Jerry Angana (PHI)	0	0
Dilshod Mansurov (UZB)	6	3
Hun Sumreat (CAM)	2	0
Vinod Kumar (IND)	8	5
Taghi Dadashi (IRI)	3	3
Yerkebala Turgunbayev (KAZ)	0	0

Quarterfinals
Abdul Karim Wahedi (AFG)	0	0
Kim Hyo-sub (KOR)	2	3
Bayaraagiin Naranbaatar (MGL)	0	1
Jon Hyon-guk (PRK)	2	1
Hidenori Taoka (JPN)	0	0
Dilshod Mansurov (UZB)	1	2
Vinod Kumar (IND)	1	1
Taghi Dadashi (IRI)	2	6

Semifinals
Kim Hyo-sub (KOR)	0	2
Jon Hyon-guk (PRK)	1	2
Dilshod Mansurov (UZB)	1	6	1
Taghi Dadashi (IRI)	2	0	0

Gold medal match
Jon Hyon-guk (PRK)	0	0
Dilshod Mansurov (UZB)	3	2

=== Repechage ===
Repechage
Ramil Rejepow (TKM)	0	0
Bayaraagiin Naranbaatar (MGL)	4	1
Jerry Angana (PHI)	0	0
Hidenori Taoka (JPN)	6	3^{F}

Bronze medal match
Bayaraagiin Naranbaatar (MGL)	0	1	0
Kim Hyo-sub (KOR)	3	1	1
Hidenori Taoka (JPN)	3	0	1
Taghi Dadashi (IRI)	0	1	0

== Final standing ==
Rank	Athlete
1st place, gold medalist(s)	Dilshod Mansurov (UZB)
2nd place, silver medalist(s)	Jon Hyon-guk (PRK)
3rd place, bronze medalist(s)	Kim Hyo-sub (KOR)
3rd place, bronze medalist(s)	Hidenori Taoka (JPN)
5	Bayaraagiin Naranbaatar (MGL)
5	Taghi Dadashi (IRI)
7	Vinod Kumar (IND)
8	Hun Sumreat (CAM)
9	Firas Al-Rifaei (SYR)
10	Nurlan Turarbek Uulu (KGZ)
11	Abdul Karim Wahedi (AFG)
12	Yerkebala Turgunbayev (KAZ)
13	Hussain Gowdooei (QAT)
14	Ramil Rejepow (TKM)
15	Jerry Angana (PHI)
