= Cycling at the 2006 Asian Games – Men's road race =

Men's road race at the 2006 Asian Games
- Venue: Doha Cycling Street Circuit
- Date: 3 December 2006
- Competitors: 46 from 24 nations

Medalists
gold medal	Wong Kam Po	Hong Kong
silver medal	Mehdi Sohrabi	Iran
bronze medal	Park Sung-baek	South Korea

The men's 156.4 km road race competition at the 2006 Asian Games was held on 3 December at the Cycling Street Circuit.

== Schedule ==
All times are Arabia Standard Time (UTC+03:00)

Date	Time	Event
Sunday, 3 December 2006	11:00	Final

== Results ==
Legend

- DNF — Did not finish
- DSQ — Disqualified

Rank	Athlete	Time
1st place, gold medalist(s)	Wong Kam Po (HKG)	3:45:02
2nd place, silver medalist(s)	Mehdi Sohrabi (IRI)	3:45:02
3rd place, bronze medalist(s)	Park Sung-baek (KOR)	3:45:02
4	Jamsrangiin Ölzii-Orshikh (MGL)	3:45:05
5	Ilya Chernyshov (KAZ)	3:45:05
6	Makoto Iijima (JPN)	3:45:05
7	Hossein Askari (IRI)	3:45:05
8	Andrey Medyannikov (KAZ)	3:45:05
9	Fumiyuki Beppu (JPN)	3:47:57
10	Li Fuyu (CHN)	3:55:17
11	Badr Mirza (UAE)	3:55:17
12	Lam Kai Tsun (HKG)	3:55:17
13	Arnel Quirimit (PHI)	3:55:17
14	Fadi Shaikhouni (SYR)	3:55:17
15	Boldbaataryn Bold-Erdene (MGL)	3:55:17
16	Jamal Al-Doseri (BRN)	3:55:21
17	Khalil Al-Rahman (QAT)	3:58:57
18	Omar Hasanin (SYR)	4:00:43
19	Chen Keng-hsien (TPE)	4:02:16
20	Khalid Ali Shambih (UAE)	4:09:14
21	Warren Davadilla (PHI)	4:10:52
22	Đặng Trung Hiếu (VIE)	4:10:52
23	Zahid Gulfam (PAK)	4:10:54
24	Samai Amari (INA)	4:10:54
25	Suhardi Hassan (MAS)	4:10:54
26	Choi Suk-yoon (KOR)	4:10:54
27	Fathi Al-Muslim (KSA)	4:10:54
28	Radhwan Al-Moraqab (QAT)	4:11:27
29	Upul Lokuge (SRI)	4:18:11
30	Samir Liane (LIB)	4:18:20
—	Ahmed Al-Doseri (BRN)	DNF
—	Mat Nur (INA)	DNF
—	Ahmed Assiri (KSA)	DNF
—	Dilsher Ali (PAK)	DNF
—	Chan Lam Fai (MAC)	DNF
—	Kwan Chung Yin (MAC)	DNF
—	Wu Po-hung (TPE)	DNF
—	Shahrulneeza Razali (MAS)	DNF
—	Mai Công Hiếu (VIE)	DNF
—	Eugen Wacker (KGZ)	DNF
—	Hemantha Kumara (SRI)	DNF
—	Jean-Pierre Fargialla (LIB)	DNF
—	Song Baoqing (CHN)	DNF
—	Mohsen Fadhel (IRQ)	DSQ
—	Farkad Jassim (IRQ)	DSQ
—	Vadim Shaekhov (UZB)	DSQ
