= Wrestling at the 2006 Asian Games – Men's freestyle 84 kg =

Men's freestyle 84 kg at the 2006 Asian Games
- Venue: Aspire Hall 4
- Date: 14 December 2006
- Competitors: 15 from 15 nations

Medalists
gold medal	Reza Yazdani	Iran
silver medal	Zaurbek Sokhiev	Uzbekistan
bronze medal	Noh Je-hyoun	South Korea
bronze medal	Magomed Kurugliyev	Kazakhstan

The men's freestyle 84 kilograms wrestling competition at the 2006 Asian Games in Doha was held on 14 December 2006 at the Aspire Hall 4.

This freestyle wrestling competition consisted of a single-elimination tournament, with a repechage used to determine the winner of two bronze medals. The two finalists faced off for gold and silver medals. Each wrestler who lost to one of the two finalists moved into the repechage, culminating in a pair of bronze medal matches featuring the semifinal losers each facing the remaining repechage opponent from their half of the bracket.

Each bout consisted of up to three rounds, lasting two minutes apiece. The wrestler who scored more points in each round was the winner of that rounds; the bout finished when one wrestler had won two rounds (and thus the match).

== Schedule ==
All times are Arabia Standard Time (UTC+03:00)

Date	Time	Event
Thursday, 14 December 2006	09:00	Preliminary
Thursday, 14 December 2006	09:00	Quarterfinals
Thursday, 14 December 2006	09:00	Semifinals
Thursday, 14 December 2006	09:00	Repechages
Thursday, 14 December 2006	18:00	Finals

== Results ==
Legend

- F — Won by fall

=== Main bracket ===
Preliminary
Zaurbek Sokhiev (UZB)	3	3
Noh Je-hyoun (KOR)	0	0
Xu Xiangzhan (CHN)	1	5
Komiljon Sheraliev (TJK)	0	2
Hasan Fadhel (IRQ)	0	0
Samatbek Tolubaev (KGZ)	3	3
Shinya Matsumoto (JPN)	0	6^{F}
Chagnaadorjiin Ganzorig (MGL)	1	0
Mohammad Rajab Nasseri (AFG)	0	0
Usman Majeed (PAK)	1	1
Reza Yazdani (IRI)	1	1	4
Magomed Kurugliyev (KAZ)	0	1	0
Marcus Valda (PHI)	0	1
Anuj Chaudhary (IND)	4	4

Quarterfinals
Seyed Abbas Zandavi (QAT)	0	0
Zaurbek Sokhiev (UZB)	1	3
Xu Xiangzhan (CHN)	0	0
Samatbek Tolubaev (KGZ)	1	4
Shinya Matsumoto (JPN)	5	1
Usman Majeed (PAK)	0	0
Reza Yazdani (IRI)	1	5
Anuj Chaudhary (IND)	0	0

Semifinals
Zaurbek Sokhiev (UZB)	3	3
Samatbek Tolubaev (KGZ)	0	0
Shinya Matsumoto (JPN)	3	0
Reza Yazdani (IRI)	8	6

Gold medal match
Zaurbek Sokhiev (UZB)	1	0
Reza Yazdani (IRI)	3	4

=== Repechage ===
Repechage
Noh Je-hyoun (KOR)	7	7
Seyed Abbas Zandavi (QAT)	0	0
Magomed Kurugliyev (KAZ)	1	4
Anuj Chaudhary (IND)	0	0

Bronze medal match
Noh Je-hyoun (KOR)	1	2
Samatbek Tolubaev (KGZ)	0	1
Magomed Kurugliyev (KAZ)	4	3
Shinya Matsumoto (JPN)	1	2

== Final standing ==
Rank	Athlete
1st place, gold medalist(s)	Reza Yazdani (IRI)
2nd place, silver medalist(s)	Zaurbek Sokhiev (UZB)
3rd place, bronze medalist(s)	Noh Je-hyoun (KOR)
3rd place, bronze medalist(s)	Magomed Kurugliyev (KAZ)
5	Samatbek Tolubaev (KGZ)
5	Shinya Matsumoto (JPN)
7	Anuj Chaudhary (IND)
8	Xu Xiangzhan (CHN)
9	Usman Majeed (PAK)
10	Komiljon Sheraliev (TJK)
11	Marcus Valda (PHI)
12	Chagnaadorjiin Ganzorig (MGL)
13	Mohammad Rajab Nasseri (AFG)
14	Hassan Fadhel (IRQ)
15	Seyed Abbas Zandavi (QAT)
