= Taekwondo at the 2006 Asian Games – Men's +84 kg =

Taekwondo competition

Men's +84 kg at the 2006 Asian Games
- Venue: Qatar SC Indoor Hall
- Date: 10 December 2006
- Competitors: 13 from 13 nations

Medalists
gold medal	Kim Hak-hwan	South Korea
silver medal	Mehdi Navaei	Iran
bronze medal	Abdulqader Al-Adhami	Qatar
bronze medal	Liu Xiaobo	China

The women's heavyweight (+84 kilograms) event at the 2006 Asian Games took place on 10 December 2006 at Qatar SC Indoor Hall, Doha, Qatar.

A total of thirteen competitors from thirteen countries competed in this event, limited to fighters whose body weight was more than 84 kilograms.

Kim Hak-hwan from South Korea won the gold medal after beating Mehdi Navaei of Iran in gold medal match 2–0, The bronze medal was shared by Abdulqader Al-Adhami from Qatar and Liu Xiaobo of China. Nakul Malhotra from India, Faisal Mahmood from Pakistan, Rami Abu-Hawelah of Palestine and Sagynysh Kalimbetov from Kazakhstan they all lost in quarterfinal round and shared the fifth place. Five more athletes lost in the first round and finished ninth.

== Schedule ==
All times are Arabia Standard Time (UTC+03:00)

Date	Time	Event
Sunday, 10 December 2006	14:00	1/8 finals
Sunday, 10 December 2006	14:00	Quarterfinals
Sunday, 10 December 2006	14:00	Semifinals
Sunday, 10 December 2006	14:00	Final

== Results ==
1/8 finals
Abdulqader Al-Adhami (QAT)	8
Akmal Irgashev (UZB)	5
Faisal Mahmood (PAK)	2
Ranjith Muramudalige (SRI)	1
Yoseef Aje (SYR)	1
Kim Hak-hwan (KOR)	8
Liu Xiaobo (CHN)	2
Tariq Habaib (JOR)	1
Badamgul Multazim (AFG)	1
Mehdi Navaei (IRI)	3

Quarterfinals
Nakul Malhotra (IND)	−1
Abdulqader Al-Adhami (QAT)	1
Faisal Mahmood (PAK)	0
Kim Hak-hwan (KOR)	7
Rami Abu Hawelah (PLE)	−1
Liu Xiaobo (CHN)	0
Mehdi Navaei (IRI)	1
Sagynysh Kalimbetov (KAZ)	0

Semifinals
Abdulqader Al-Adhami (QAT)	3
Kim Hak-hwan (KOR)	4
Liu Xiaobo (CHN)	1
Mehdi Navaei (IRI)	3

Final
Kim Hak-hwan (KOR)	2
Mehdi Navaei (IRI)	0
