= Karate at the 2006 Asian Games – Men's kumite 80 kg =

Karate competition

Men's kumite 80 kg at the 2006 Asian Games
- Venue: Qatar SC Indoor Hall
- Date: 13 December 2006
- Competitors: 17 from 17 nations

Medalists
gold medal	Ahmad Muneer	Kuwait
silver medal	Ryosuke Shimizu	Japan
bronze medal	Mutasembellah Khair	Jordan
bronze medal	Esmaeil Torkzad	Iran

The men's kumite 80 kilograms competition at the 2006 Asian Games in Doha, Qatar was held on 13 December 2006 at the Qatar SC Indoor Hall.

== Schedule ==
All times are Arabia Standard Time (UTC+03:00)

Date	Time	Event
Wednesday, 13 December 2006	13:00	1/16 finals
Wednesday, 13 December 2006	13:00	1/8 finals
Wednesday, 13 December 2006	13:00	Quarterfinals
Wednesday, 13 December 2006	13:00	Semifinals
Wednesday, 13 December 2006	13:00	Repechage 2R
Wednesday, 13 December 2006	13:00	Finals

== Results ==
Legend

- H — Won by hansoku
- K — Won by kiken (8–0)

=== Main bracket ===
==== Final ====
Final
Ryosuke Shimizu (JPN)	1
Ahmad Muneer (KUW)	5^{H}

==== Top half ====
1/16 finals

1/8 finals
Fakhruddin Abdulmajid (UAE)	5
Ali Alawie (LIB)	0
Mohamed Nifaz Jurampathy (SRI)	2
Askar Baitleuov (KAZ)	3
Davron Toshpolatov (UZB)	1
Mutasembellah Khair (JOR)	9
Shen Chia-hao (TPE)	2
Ryosuke Shimizu (JPN)	7

Quarterfinals
Fakhruddin Abdulmajid (UAE)	1
Askar Baitleuov (KAZ)	4
Mutasembellah Khair (JOR)	2
Ryosuke Shimizu (JPN)	3

Semifinals
Askar Baitleuov (KAZ)	2
Ryosuke Shimizu (JPN)	8

==== Bottom half ====
1/16 finals
Younis Al-Aaraj (QAT)	1
Esmaeil Torkzad (IRI)	1

1/8 finals
Kim Byung-chul (KOR)	7
Agha Muhammad (PAK)	3
Esmaeil Torkzad (IRI)	4
Vũ Minh Ngọc (VIE)	0
Hendro Salim (INA)	9
Mohamed Al-Abed (BRN)	1
Ahmad Muneer (KUW)	10
Ramsaran Twati (NEP)	2

Quarterfinals
Kim Byung-chul (KOR)	3
Esmaeil Torkzad (IRI)	4
Hendro Salim (INA)	2
Ahmad Muneer (KUW)	3

Semifinals
Esmaeil Torkzad (IRI)	4
Ahmad Muneer (KUW)	5

=== Repechage ===
Repechage 2R
Mutasembellah Khair (JOR)	K
Shen Chia-hao (TPE)
Ramsaran Twati (NEP)	3
Hendro Salim (INA)	4

Final repechage
Askar Baitleuov (KAZ)	2
Mutasembellah Khair (JOR)	3
Hendro Salim (INA)	1
Esmaeil Torkzad (IRI)	7
