= Wushu at the 2006 Asian Games – Men's sanshou 56 kg =

Men's sanshou 56 kg at the 2006 Asian Games
- Venue: Aspire Hall 3
- Dates: 11–14 December 2006
- Competitors: 14 from 14 nations

Medalists
gold medal	Li Teng	China
silver medal	Phoxay Aphailath	Laos
bronze medal	Kim Jun-yul	South Korea
bronze medal	Jalil Ataei	Iran

The men's sanshou 56 kilograms at the 2006 Asian Games in Doha, Qatar was held from 11 to 14 December at the Aspire Hall 3 in Aspire Zone.

A total of fourteen competitors from fourteen countries competed in this event, which is limited to fighters whose body weight was less than 56 kilograms.

Li Teng from China won the gold medal after his opponent Phoxay Aphailath of Laos did not show up for the gold medal bout and lost the final by default.

Kim Jun-yul of South Korea and Jalil Ataei from Iran won the bronze medal.

== Schedule ==
All times are Arabia Standard Time (UTC+03:00)

Date	Time	Event
Monday, 11 December 2006	15:30	Preliminary
Tuesday, 12 December 2006	14:00	Quarterfinals
Wednesday, 13 December 2006	16:00	Semifinals
Thursday, 14 December 2006	15:00	Final

== Results ==
Legend

- WO — Won by walkover

Preliminary
Rexel Nganhayna (PHI)	2
Wang Shih-hung (TPE)	0
Samart Khaphol (THA)	0
Li Teng (CHN)	2
Mirbek Suiumbaev (KGZ)	0
Trần Nhật Huy (VIE)	2
Mohammed Al-Ashwal (YEM)	2
Muhammad Bashir (PAK)	1
Ölziibadrakhyn Saruul-Od (MGL)	0
Phoxay Aphailath (LAO)	2
Jalil Ataei (IRI)	2
Rustam Abdullayev (KAZ)	1

Quarterfinals
Kim Jun-yul (KOR)	2
Rexel Nganhayna (PHI)	0
Li Teng (CHN)	2
Trần Nhật Huy (VIE)	0
Mohammed Al-Ashwal (YEM)	0
Phoxay Aphailath (LAO)	2
Jalil Ataei (IRI)	2
Lakshman Hettiarachchi (SRI)	0

Semifinals
Kim Jun-yul (KOR)	0
Li Teng (CHN)	2
Phoxay Aphailath (LAO)	2
Jalil Ataei (IRI)	0

Final
Li Teng (CHN)	WO
Phoxay Aphailath (LAO)
