= Wushu at the 2006 Asian Games – Men's sanshou 70 kg =

Men's sanshou 70 kg at the 2006 Asian Games
- Venue: Aspire Hall 3
- Dates: 11–14 December 2006
- Competitors: 13 from 13 nations

Medalists
gold medal	Xu Yanfei	China
silver medal	Eduard Folayang	Philippines
bronze medal	Ahn Yong-woon	South Korea
bronze medal	Khosro Minoo	Iran

The men's sanshou 70 kilograms at the 2006 Asian Games in Doha, Qatar was held from 11 to 14 December at the Aspire Hall 3 in Aspire Zone.

A total of thirteen competitors from thirteen countries competed in this event, limited to fighters whose body weight was less than 70 kilograms.

Xu Yanfei from China won the gold medal after beating Eduard Folayang in gold medal bout 2–0.

== Schedule ==
All times are Arabia Standard Time (UTC+03:00)

Date	Time	Event
Monday, 11 December 2006	15:30	Preliminary
Tuesday, 12 December 2006	14:00	Quarterfinals
Wednesday, 13 December 2006	16:00	Semifinals
Thursday, 14 December 2006	15:00	Final

== Results ==
Legend

- DQ — Won by disqualification
- KO — Won by knockout

Preliminary
Prajaksin Kaenjanbai (THA)	0
Ahn Yong-woon (KOR)	2
Mario Khnaisser (LIB)	0
Muzaffar Yusupov (UZB)	2
Xu Yanfei (CHN)	2
Dhanbir Maharjan (NEP)	0
O. Joy Singh (IND)	0
Khosro Minoo (IRI)	2
Eduard Folayang (PHI)	2
Ijaz Ahmed (PAK)	0

Quarterfinals
Ahmad Al-Zaabi (SYR)	0
Ahn Yong-woon (KOR)	2
Muzaffar Yusupov (UZB)
Xu Yanfei (CHN)	KO
Omer Bu-Taibaan (KUW)
Khosro Minoo (IRI)	DQ
Eduard Folayang (PHI)	2
Kumar Jaliev (KGZ)	0

Semifinals
Ahn Yong-woon (KOR)	0
Xu Yanfei (CHN)	2
Khosro Minoo (IRI)	1
Eduard Folayang (PHI)	2

Final
Xu Yanfei (CHN)	2
Eduard Folayang (PHI)	0
