= Shooting at the 2006 Asian Games – Women's trap =

Women's trap at the 2006 Asian Games
- Venue: Lusail Shooting Range
- Dates: 2 December 2006
- Competitors: 34 from 13 nations

Medalists
gold medal	Chen Li	China
silver medal	Zhu Mei	China
bronze medal	Lin Yi-chun	Chinese Taipei

The women's trap competition at the 2006 Asian Games in Doha, Qatar was held on 2 December at the Lusail Shooting Range.

== Schedule ==
All times are Arabia Standard Time (UTC+03:00)

Date	Time	Event
Saturday, 2 December 2006	08:00	Qualification
Saturday, 2 December 2006	12:30	Final

== Records ==
Prior to this competition, the existing world, Asian and Games records were as follows.

Qualification
World Record	Viktoria Chuyko (UKR)	74	Nicosia, Cyprus	13 June 1998
Asian Record	Chen Li (CHN)	74	Qingyuan, China	4 April 2006
Games Record	Pak Yong-hui (PRK); Ri Hye-gyong (PRK)	64	Busan, South Korea	2 October 2002
Final
World Record	Zuzana Štefečeková (SVK)	96	Qingyuan, China	4 April 2006
Asian Record	Chen Li (CHN)	95	Qingyuan, China	4 April 2006
Games Record	—	—	—	—

== Results ==
=== Qualification ===
Rank	Athlete	Round			Total	S-off	Notes
Rank	Athlete	1	2	3	Total	S-off	Notes
1	Chen Li (CHN)	23	22	24	69		GR
2	Lin Yi-chun (TPE)	22	24	20	66		
3	Kim Yong-bok (PRK)	22	22	20	64		
4	Lee Myung-ae (KOR)	18	20	25	63	+3	
5	Pak Yong-hui (PRK)	22	19	22	63	+3	
6	Zhu Mei (CHN)	20	23	20	63	+3	
7	Wang Yujin (CHN)	21	19	23	63	+2	
8	Chattaya Kitcharoen (THA)	19	25	19	63	+1	
9	Yukie Nakayama (JPN)	19	22	21	62		
10	Nahla Aboumansour (IRI)	22	22	18	62		
11	Lee Bo-na (KOR)	20	20	20	60		
12	Ray Bassil (LIB)	21	22	17	60		
13	Keiko Suzu (JPN)	19	19	21	59		
14	Chae Hye-gyong (PRK)	21	19	19	59		
15	Mariya Dmitriyenko (KAZ)	20	19	19	58		
16	Yelena Struchayeva (KAZ)	21	16	20	57		
17	Gay Corral (PHI)	17	18	21	56		
18	Nguyễn Thị Tuyết Mai (VIE)	17	19	20	56		
19	Sepideh Sirani (IRI)	18	20	18	56		
20	Aimee Gana (PHI)	17	19	19	55		
21	Hoàng Thị Tuất (VIE)	18	19	18	55		
22	Supawan Karjaejuntasak (THA)	19	19	17	55		
23	Anastassiya Davydova (KAZ)	21	16	17	54		
24	Nanpapas Viravaidya (THA)	21	18	14	53		
25	Megumi Inoue (JPN)	17	17	18	52		
26	Lee Jung-a (KOR)	20	18	13	51		
27	Veneranda Garcia (PHI)	18	13	18	49		
28	Masoumeh Ameri (IRI)	19	14	15	48		
29	Zaineb Al-Suwaidi (QAT)	14	12	20	46		
30	Shahad Al-Hawal (KUW)	14	16	15	45		
31	Nguyễn Thùy Dương (VIE)	18	16	11	45		
32	Zulaikha Al-Kubaisi (QAT)	13	15	16	44		
33	Noora Al-Ali (QAT)	13	11	19	43		
34	Sumaiah Al-Juhail (KUW)	14	13	14	41		

=== Final ===
Rank	Athlete	Qual.	Final	Total	S-off	Notes
1st place, gold medalist(s)	Chen Li (CHN)	69	20	89		GR
2nd place, silver medalist(s)	Zhu Mei (CHN)	63	17	80	+1	
3rd place, bronze medalist(s)	Lin Yi-chun (TPE)	66	14	80	+0	
4	Lee Myung-ae (KOR)	63	16	79		
5	Pak Yong-hui (PRK)	63	15	78		
6	Kim Yong-bok (PRK)	64	11	75		
