= Wushu at the 2006 Asian Games – Men's sanshou 65 kg =

Men's sanshou 65 kg at the 2006 Asian Games
- Venue: Aspire Hall 3
- Dates: 11–14 December 2006
- Competitors: 12 from 12 nations

Medalists
gold medal	Zhao Guangyong	China
silver medal	Nguyễn Đức Trung	Vietnam
bronze medal	Cai Liang Chan	Macau
bronze medal	Maratab Ali Shah	Pakistan

The men's sanshou 65 kilograms at the 2006 Asian Games in Doha, Qatar was held from 11 to 14 December at the Aspire Hall 3 in Aspire Zone.

A total of fifteen competitors from fifteen countries competed in this event, limited to fighters whose body weight was less than 65 kilograms.

Zhao Guangyong from China won the gold medal after beating Nguyễn Đức Trung of Vietnam in gold medal bout 2–0 after winning both rounds in the final. The bronze medal was shared by both semifinal losers Cai Liang Chan from Macau and Maratab Ali Shah of Pakistan.

== Schedule ==
All times are Arabia Standard Time (UTC+03:00)

Date	Time	Event
Monday, 11 December 2006	15:30	Preliminary
Tuesday, 12 December 2006	14:00	Quarterfinals
Wednesday, 13 December 2006	16:00	Semifinals
Thursday, 14 December 2006	15:00	Final

== Results ==
Legend

- KO — Won by knockout

Preliminary
Saed Siahmoshtehei (IRI)	2
Magsarjavyn Batjargal (MGL)	0
Zhao Guangyong (CHN)	2
Maxut Ibrayev (KAZ)	0
Maratab Ali Shah (PAK)	2
Emil Toktogonov (KGZ)	0
Bekzod Bahodirov (UZB)	0
Chou Ting-yuan (TPE)	2

Quarterfinals
Cai Liang Chan (MAC)	KO
Saed Siahmoshtehei (IRI)
Zhao Guangyong (CHN)	KO
Habibullah Habibi (AFG)
Ratkamphon Thongnopakhun (THA)
Maratab Ali Shah (PAK)	KO
Chou Ting-yuan (TPE)	0
Nguyễn Đức Trung (VIE)	2

Semifinals
Cai Liang Chan (MAC)	0
Zhao Guangyong (CHN)	2
Maratab Ali Shah (PAK)	0
Nguyễn Đức Trung (VIE)	2

Final
Zhao Guangyong (CHN)	2
Nguyễn Đức Trung (VIE)	0
