= Cycling at the 2006 Asian Games – Men's madison =

Men's madison at the 2006 Asian Games
- Venue: Aspire Hall 1
- Date: 14 December 2006
- Competitors: 18 from 9 nations

Medalists
gold medal	Jang Sun-jae; Park Sung-baek	South Korea
silver medal	Ilya Chernyshov; Alexey Lyalko	Kazakhstan
bronze medal	Mehdi Sohrabi; Amir Zargari	Iran

The men's 50 km madison competition at the 2006 Asian Games was held on 14 December at the Aspire Hall 1.

== Schedule ==
All times are Arabia Standard Time (UTC+03:00)

Date	Time	Event
Thursday, 14 December 2006	14:00	Final

== Results ==
Legend

- DNF — Did not finish

Rank	Team	Sprint										Laps down	Total	Finish order
Rank	Team	1	2	3	4	5	6	7	8	9	10	Laps down	Total	Finish order
1st place, gold medalist(s)	South Korea (KOR); Jang Sun-jae; Park Sung-baek	5	5	5	3	5	5	2	3	2			35	5
2nd place, silver medalist(s)	Kazakhstan (KAZ); Ilya Chernyshov; Alexey Lyalko	3	3	3	2	3	2	5					21	7
3rd place, bronze medalist(s)	Iran (IRI); Mehdi Sohrabi; Amir Zargari			2		2	3	3	1	3	3		17	2
4	Hong Kong (HKG); Cheung King Wai; Wong Kam Po	2	2	1		1			5	1	1		13	4
5	Chinese Taipei (TPE); Chen Keng-hsien; Wu Po-hung								2	5	2		9	3
6	China (CHN); Song Baoqing; Wen Hairui	1	1		5		1	1				−1	9	6
7	Japan (JPN); Kazuhiro Mori; Taiji Nishitani				1						5	−2	6	1
—	Indonesia (INA); Fatahillah Abdullah; Kaswanto											−7	DNF	
—	Philippines (PHI); Alvin Benosa; Arnold Marcelo											−8	DNF	
