= Taekwondo at the 2006 Asian Games – Women's +72 kg =

Taekwondo competition

Women's +72 kg at the 2006 Asian Games
- Venue: Qatar SC Indoor Hall
- Date: 10 December 2006
- Competitors: 6 from 6 nations

Medalists
| gold medal | Chen Zhong | China |
| silver medal | Evgeniya Karimova | Uzbekistan |
| bronze medal | Afsaneh Sheikhi | Iran |
| bronze medal | Amalia Kurniasih Palupi | Indonesia |

The women's heavyweight (+72 kilograms) event at the 2006 Asian Games took place on 10 December 2006 at Qatar SC Indoor Hall, Doha, Qatar.

== Schedule ==
All times are Arabia Standard Time (UTC+03:00)

| Date | Time | Event |
|---|---|---|
| Sunday, 10 December 2006 | 14:00 | Quarterfinals |
| Sunday, 10 December 2006 | 14:00 | Semifinals |
| Sunday, 10 December 2006 | 14:00 | Final |

== Results ==
| Quarterfinals | | Semifinals | | Final |
| | | Evgeniya Karimova (UZB) | 1 |
| Rapatkorn Prasopsuk (THA) | 1 | Afsaneh Sheikhi (IRI) | 0 |
| Afsaneh Sheikhi (IRI) | 2 | | | Evgeniya Karimova (UZB) | 0 |
| Nadin Dawani (JOR) | 1 | | | Chen Zhong (CHN) | 4 |
| Chen Zhong (CHN) | 2 | Chen Zhong (CHN) | 7 |
| | | Amalia Kurniasih Palupi (INA) | 0 |
