= Taekwondo at the 2006 Asian Games – Men's 84 kg =

Taekwondo competition

Men's 84 kg at the 2006 Asian Games
- Venue: Qatar SC Indoor Hall
- Date: 9 December 2006
- Competitors: 12 from 12 nations

Medalists
gold medal	Yousef Karami	Iran
silver medal	Park Kyeong-hoon	South Korea
bronze medal	Arman Chilmanov	Kazakhstan
bronze medal	Shokirjon Rajabov	Tajikistan

The men's middleweight (−84 kilograms) taekwondo event at the 2006 Asian Games took place on 9 December 2006 at Qatar SC Indoor Hall, Doha, Qatar.

A total of twelve competitors from twelve countries competed in this event, limited to fighters whose body weight was less than 84 kilograms.

== Schedule ==
All times are Arabia Standard Time (UTC+03:00)

Date	Time	Event
Saturday, 9 December 2006	14:00	1/8 finals
Saturday, 9 December 2006	14:00	Quarterfinals
Saturday, 9 December 2006	14:00	Semifinals
Saturday, 9 December 2006	14:00	Final

== Results ==
Legend

- K — Won by knockout
- R — Won by referee stop contest

1/8 finals
Abdelhameed Atalla (QAT)	0
Arman Chilmanov (KAZ)	5
Rosandi (INA)	0
Yousef Karami (IRI)	2^{K}
Park Kyeong-hoon (KOR)	0^{R}
Nguyễn Trọng Cường (VIE)	0
Phub Thinley (BHU)	−1
Shokirjon Rajabov (TJK)	6

Quarterfinals
Sandeep Kundu (IND)	3
Arman Chilmanov (KAZ)	7
Yousef Karami (IRI)	7
Liu Guangsong (CHN)	−1
Alexander Briones (PHI)	2
Park Kyeong-hoon (KOR)	3
Shokirjon Rajabov (TJK)	4
Mohammed Kahla (PLE)	−1

Semifinals
Arman Chilmanov (KAZ)	1
Yousef Karami (IRI)	5
Park Kyeong-hoon (KOR)	6
Shokirjon Rajabov (TJK)	0

Final
Yousef Karami (IRI)	4
Park Kyeong-hoon (KOR)	3
