= 2006 Asian Games medal table =

- Malaysian sepak takraw player Azlan Mubin executing an acrobatic overhead kick at the 2006 Doha Asian Games.
- Location: Doha, Qatar

Highlights
- Most gold medals: China 165
- Most total medals: China 316
- Medalling NOCs: 38

The 2006 Asian Games medal table is a list of nations ranked by the medals won by their athletes during the multi-sport event, which was held in Doha, Qatar, from 1 to 15 December 2006. The National Olympic Committees are ranked by number of gold medals first, with number of silver then bronze medals acting as the rank decider in the event of equal standing. Other alternative methods of ranking include listing by total medals.

== Medal table ==
* Host nation (Qatar)

Rank	NOC	Gold	Silver	Bronze	Total
1	China (CHN)	165	88	63	316
2	South Korea (KOR)	58	52	83	193
3	Japan (JPN)	50	72	78	200
4	Kazakhstan (KAZ)	23	20	42	85
5	Thailand (THA)	13	15	26	54
6	Iran (IRI)	11	15	22	48
7	Uzbekistan (UZB)	11	14	15	40
8	India (IND)	10	17	26	53
9	Qatar (QAT)*	9	12	11	32
10	Chinese Taipei (TPE)	9	10	27	46
11	Malaysia (MAS)	8	17	17	42
12	Singapore (SIN)	8	7	12	27
13	Saudi Arabia (KSA)	8	0	6	14
14	Bahrain (BRN)	7	9	4	20
15	Hong Kong (HKG)	6	12	11	29
16	North Korea (PRK)	6	8	15	29
17	Kuwait (KUW)	6	5	2	13
18	Philippines (PHI)	4	6	9	19
19	Vietnam (VIE)	3	13	7	23
20	United Arab Emirates (UAE)	3	4	3	10
21	Mongolia (MGL)	2	5	8	15
22	Indonesia (INA)	2	4	14	20
23	Syria (SYR)	2	2	2	6
24	Tajikistan (TJK)	2	0	2	4
25	Jordan (JOR)	1	3	4	8
26	Lebanon (LIB)	1	0	2	3
27	Myanmar (MYA)	0	4	7	11
28	Kyrgyzstan (KGZ)	0	2	6	8
29	Iraq (IRQ)	0	2	1	3
30	Macau (MAC)	0	1	6	7
31	Pakistan (PAK)	0	1	3	4
32	Sri Lanka (SRI)	0	1	2	3
33	Laos (LAO)	0	1	0	1
33	Turkmenistan (TKM)	0	1	0	1
35	Nepal (NEP)	0	0	3	3
36	Afghanistan (AFG)	0	0	1	1
36	Bangladesh (BAN)	0	0	1	1
36	Yemen (YEM)	0	0	1	1
Totals (38 entries)		428	423	542	1,393

== Changes in medal standings ==
Ruling date	Sport	Event	Nation	Gold	Silver	Bronze	Total
11 December 2006	Weightlifting	Women's 75 kg	Myanmar		–1		–1
11 December 2006	Weightlifting	Women's 75 kg	South Korea		+1	–1	0
11 December 2006	Weightlifting	Women's 75 kg	Indonesia			+1	+1
18 December 2006	Athletics	Women's 800 m	India		–1		–1
18 December 2006	Athletics	Women's 800 m	Kazakhstan		+1	–1	0
18 December 2006	Athletics	Women's 800 m	Uzbekistan			+1	+1
15 May 2007	Bodybuilding	Men's 70 kg	Bahrain		–1		–1
15 May 2007	Bodybuilding	Men's 70 kg	Indonesia		+1	–1	0
15 May 2007	Bodybuilding	Men's 70 kg	Japan			+1	+1
15 May 2007	Bodybuilding	Men's 90 kg	South Korea		–1		–1
15 May 2007	Bodybuilding	Men's 90 kg	Syria		+1	–1	0
15 May 2007	Bodybuilding	Men's 90 kg	Hong Kong			+1	+1
17 September 2014	Gymnastics – Artistic	Women's uneven bars	North Korea			–1	–1
17 September 2014	Gymnastics – Artistic	Women's uneven bars	Japan			+1	+1
17 September 2014	Gymnastics – Artistic	Women's team	North Korea		–1		–1
17 September 2014	Gymnastics – Artistic	Women's team	Japan		+1	–1	0
17 September 2014	Gymnastics – Artistic	Women's team	South Korea			+1	+1
