= Taekwondo at the 2006 Asian Games – Women's 72 kg =

Taekwondo competition

Women's 72 kg at the 2006 Asian Games
- Venue: Qatar SC Indoor Hall
- Date: 9 December 2006
- Competitors: 9 from 9 nations

Medalists
gold medal	Luo Wei	China
silver medal	Alaa Kutkut	Jordan
bronze medal	Mahrouz Saei	Iran
bronze medal	Lee In-jong	South Korea

The women's middleweight (−72 kilograms) event at the 2006 Asian Games took place on 9 December 2006 at Qatar SC Indoor Hall, Doha, Qatar.

A total of nine competitors from nine countries (NOCs) competed in this event, limited to fighters whose body weight was less than 72 kilograms.

Luo Wei of China, who had won a bronze medal four years ago at the 2002 Asian Games in Busan of South Korea, won the gold medal after beating Alaa Kutkut of Jordan in gold medal match 1–0, The bronze medal was shared by Iranian Mahrouz Saei and Lee In-jong of South Korea.

Athletes from Bahrain, Vietnam, Chinese Taipei and the Philippines lost in the quarterfinal round and shared the fifth place.

== Schedule ==
All times are Arabia Standard Time (UTC+03:00)

Date	Time	Event
Saturday, 9 December 2006	14:00	1/8 finals
Saturday, 9 December 2006	14:00	Quarterfinals
Saturday, 9 December 2006	14:00	Semifinals
Saturday, 9 December 2006	14:00	Final

== Results ==
1/8 finals
Abrar Al-Fahad (KUW)	1
Criselda Roxas (PHI)	3

Quarterfinals
Mahrouz Saei (IRI)	5
Criselda Roxas (PHI)	4
Nguyễn Lan Anh (VIE)	0
Alaa Kutkut (JOR)	7
Lee In-jong (KOR)	5
Haneen Abdulaziz (BRN)	0
Yang Wen-chen (TPE)	−1
Luo Wei (CHN)	1

Semifinals
Mahrouz Saei (IRI)	0
Alaa Kutkut (JOR)	1
Lee In-jong (KOR)	6
Luo Wei (CHN)	7

Final
Alaa Kutkut (JOR)	0
Luo Wei (CHN)	1
