= Nasser al-Shami =

Syrian boxer

Personal information
- Born: June 27, 1982 (age 44)

Sport
- Sport: Boxing
- Weight class: Heavyweight
Medal record
Men's boxing
Representing Syria
Olympic Games
| Bronze medal – third place | 2004 Athens | Heavyweight |
Asian Games
| Bronze medal – third place | 2002 Busan | Heavyweight |
| Bronze medal – third place | 2006 Doha | Heavyweight |
Asian Championships
| Gold medal – first place | 2004 Puerto Princesa | Heavyweight |
| Bronze medal – third place | 2002 Seremban | Heavyweight |

Nasser Al Shami (Arabic: ناصر الشامي; born June 27, 1982) is a Syrian boxer, who competed in the heavyweight division (– 91 kg) at the 2004 Summer Olympics and won a bronze medal.

== Career ==
At the 2002 Asian Games he was defeated by Shoukat Ali and won the bronze medal. He qualified for the Athens Games by winning the gold medal at the 2004 Asian Amateur Boxing Championships in Puerto Princesa, Philippines. In the final he defeated Kazakhstan's Pavel Storozhuk.

Olympics 2004:

- Defeated Emmanuel Izonritei (Nigeria) 30-17
- Defeated Vugar Alakparov (Azerbaijan) DQ 4 (1:40)
- Lost to Odlanier Solis Fonte (Cuba) RSC 3 (1:29)

At the 2006 Asian Games he lost to Uzbek Jasur Matchanov by walkover.

== Injury ==
On July 4, 2011, Al Shami participated in the 2011 Syrian uprisings against the Syrian government, where he joined the mass protests in the city of Hama, Syria. On that day, he was allegedly injured by government security forces.
