= Mohsen Arzani =

Iranian football player

Personal information
- Full name: Mohsen Arzani
- Date of birth: September 23, 1984 (age 42)
- Place of birth: Iran
- Position: Defender

Team information
- Current team: Saipa
- Number: 21

Senior career*
Years	Team	Apps	(Gls)
2002–2008	Saipa	53	(2)
2008–2009	Payam Mashhad	32	(0)
2009–2010	Esteghlal Ahvaz	27	(1)
2010–2012	Paykan	50	(2)
2012–	Saipa	34	(2)

International career
2001	Iran U17	3	(0)
2005–2006	Iran U23	10	(1)
Medal record
Representing Iran
Men's Football
Bronze medal – third place	2006 Qatar	Team competition
- * Club domestic league appearances and goals as of 15 May 2015

Mohsen Arzani (Persian: محسن ارزانی; born September 23, 1984) is an Iranian football player currently playing in the Iran's Premier Football League. Arzani played for Iran at the 2001 FIFA U-17 World Championship in Trinidad and Tobago. He was a member of Iran national under-23 football team, participating in the 2006 Asian Games in Qatar.
