= Taimuraz Tigiyev =

Russian-Kazakhstani freestyle wrestler (born 1982)

Personal information
- Born: 15 January 1982 (age 44) Vladikavkaz
- Height: 185 cm (6 ft 1 in)

Sport
- Country: Kazakhstan
- Sport: Freestyle wrestling
- Weight class: 96 kg
Medal record
Asian Games
Bronze medal – third place	2006 Doha	96 kg

Taimuraz Tigiyev (born 15 January 1982 in Vladikavkaz) is a Russian-Kazakhstani wrestler from Moscow of Ossetian origin. He initially won a silver medal at the 2008 Summer Olympics in the men's freestyle 96 kg event. In 2016, he was stripped of his Olympic medal after a retest of his doping sample tested positive for steroids.

At the 2012 Summer Olympics in the men's freestyle 96 kg event, he lost in the second round to Abdusalam Gadisov of Russia.
