= Jiang Huachen =

Chinese Greco-Roman wrestler

Jiang Huachen (born February 3, 1982, in Shandong) is a Chinese Greco-Roman wrestler who competed at the 2008 Summer Olympics. Prior to that, his personal best performance was coming first at the 2006 National Championships - 96 kg Greco-Roman class.

== See also ==
- China at the 2008 Summer Olympics for more details
