= Jasur Matchanov =

Uzbekistani boxer (born 1984)

Personal information
- Full name: Jasur Matchanov
- Nationality: Uzbekistan
- Born: March 15, 1984 (age 42) Tashkent, Uzbekistan

Sport
- Sport: Boxing
- Weight class: Heavyweight
Medal record
World Amateur Championships
Bronze medal – third place	2005 Mianyang	Heavyweight
Asian Games
Silver medal – second place	2006 Doha	Heavyweight
Asian Championships
Silver medal – second place	2005 Ho Chi Minh City	Heavyweight
Bronze medal – third place	2007 Ulan Bator	Heavyweight

Jasur Matchanov (born March 15, 1984) is an Uzbek amateur boxer from Tashkent who medaled repeatedly at 201 lbs in international tournaments.

== Career ==
In 2004 he boxed at super heavyweight at the military world championships, winning bronze after losing to Steffen Kretschmann.

In 2005 at the world championships he competed at 201 lbs where he bested Jose Julio Payares and Clemente Russo, but lost 19-25 to Elchin Alizade and won bronze.

He won silver at the Military World Championships 2006 when he beat Hamsat Gilishanov from Kazachstan but lost the final to hard-hitting Russian favorite Rakhim Chakhkeiv 4-21.

At the 2006 Asian Games he lost the final to Iranian Ali Mazaheri 19-25 .

At the 2007 World Championships he was upset early by Moldavian Michael Muntyan . He did not compete in the 2009 World Championships.

In 2009 he ended his career in amateur boxing.

At the moment he is studying in MPA of the APA (Academy of Public Administration) of Uzbekistan, has a family, a son and a daughter.
