= Laos at the 2006 Asian Games =

- IOC code: LAO
- NOC: National Olympic Committee of Lao

in Doha
- Competitors: 15
- Medals Ranked 33rd: Gold 0 Silver 1 Bronze 0 Total 1

Asian Games appearances (overview)
- 1974; 1978; 1982; 1986; 1990; 1994; 1998; 2002; 2006; 2010; 2014; 2018; 2022; 2026

Laos participated in the 15th Asian Games, officially known as the XV Asiad held in Doha, Qatar from December 1 to December 15, 2006. Laos ranked 33rd along with Turkmenistan with a lone silver medal in this edition of the Asiad.

== Medalist ==
Medal	Name	Sport	Event	Date
Silver	Phoxay Aphaylath	Wushu	Men's Sanda 56kg	14
