= Jordan at the 2006 Asian Games =

- IOC code: JOR
- NOC: Jordan Olympic Committee

in Doha
- Flag bearer: Nadin Dawani
- Medals Ranked 25th: Gold 1 Silver 3 Bronze 4 Total 8

Asian Games appearances (overview)
- 1986; 1990; 1994; 1998; 2002; 2006; 2010; 2014; 2018; 2022; 2026

Jordan participated in the 15th Asian Games, officially known as the XV Asiad held in Doha, Qatar from December 1 to December 15, 2006. Jordan ranked 25th with a lone gold medal and 3 silver medals in this edition of the Asiad.

== Medalists ==
Medal	Name	Sport	Event	Date
Gold	Mohammad Al-Bakhit	Taekwondo	Men's 54 kg	7
Silver	Alaa Kutkut	Taekwondo	Women's 72 kg	9
Silver	Jamil Al-Khuffash	Taekwondo	Men's 67 kg	10
Silver	Yahia Abu-Tabeekh	Wrestling	Men's Greco-Roman 84 kg	10
Bronze	Ahmad Al-Saafeen	Bodybuilding	Men's +90 kg	9
Bronze	Talat Khalil	Karate	Men's kumite 75 kg	13
Bronze	Mutasembellah Khair	Karate	Men's kumite 80 kg	13
Bronze	Amer Abu-Afifeh	Karate	Men's kumite +80 kg	13
