= Turkmenistan at the 2006 Asian Games =

- IOC code: TKM
- NOC: National Olympic Committee of Turkmenistan

in Doha
- Medals Ranked 33rd: Gold 0 Silver 1 Bronze 0 Total 1

Asian Games appearances (overview)
- 1994; 1998; 2002; 2006; 2010; 2014; 2018; 2022; 2026

Turkmenistan participated at the 2006 Asian Games, held in Doha, Qatar from December 1 to December 15, 2006. Turkmenistan ranked 33rd along with Laos with a lone silver medal in this edition of the Asiad.

== Medalist ==
| Medal | Name | Sport | Event | Date |
|---|---|---|---|---|
| Silver | Igor Pirekeyev | Shooting | Men's 50 metre rifle prone | 4 |
