= Yemen at the 2006 Asian Games =

- IOC code: YEM
- NOC: Yemen Olympic Committee
- Website: www.nocyemen.org (in Arabic and English)

in Doha
- Competitors: 24
- Flag bearer: Anas Aqlan
- Medals Ranked 36th: Gold 0 Silver 0 Bronze 1 Total 1

Asian Games appearances (overview)
- 1990; 1994; 1998; 2002; 2006; 2010; 2014; 2018; 2022; 2026

Other related appearances
- North Yemen (1982, 1986); South Yemen (1982)

Yemen participated in the 2006 Asian Games held in Doha, Qatar with a total of 24 athletes (24 male, 0 female) in six different sports.

== Medalists ==
Medal	Name	Sport	Event	Date
Bronze	Naji Al Ashwal	Wushu	Men's sanda 52 kg	14
