= Afghanistan at the 2006 Asian Games =

- IOC code: AFG
- NOC: Afghanistan National Olympic Committee

in Doha
- Competitors: 47
- Medals Ranked 36th: Gold 0 Silver 0 Bronze 1 Total 1

Asian Games appearances (overview)
- 1951; 1954; 1958; 1962; 1966; 1970; 1974; 1978; 1982; 1986; 1990; 1994; 1998; 2002; 2006; 2010; 2014; 2018; 2022; 2026

Afghanistan participated in the 2006 Asian Games held in Doha, Qatar from December 1 to December 15, 2006. The country was represented by 42 athletes participating in 10 sports. Nesar Ahmad Bahave won a bronze medal in the men's -72 kg taekwondo tournament.

== Medalists ==
Medal	Name	Sport	Event	Date
Bronze	Nesar Ahmad Bahave	Taekwondo	Men's 72 kg	7
