= Tajikistan at the 2006 Asian Games =

- IOC code: TJK
- NOC: National Olympic Committee of the Republic of Tajikistan

in Doha
- Flag bearer: Sherali Dostiev
- Medals Ranked 24th: Gold 2 Silver 0 Bronze 2 Total 4

Asian Games appearances (overview)
- 1994; 1998; 2002; 2006; 2010; 2014; 2018; 2022; 2026

Tajikistan participated at the 2006 Asian Games held in Doha from December 1 to December 15, 2006. Tajikistan ranked 24th with 2 gold medals in this edition of the Asiad.

== Medalists ==
Medal	Name	Sport	Event	Date
Gold	Dilshod Nazarov	Athletics	Men's hammer throw	8
Gold	Jahon Qurbonov	Boxing	Men's 81 kg	13
Bronze	Rasul Boqiev	Judo	Men's 73 kg	4
Bronze	Shokirjon Rajabov	Taekwondo	Men's 84 kg	9
