= Lebanon at the 2006 Asian Games =

- IOC code: LIB
- NOC: Lebanese Olympic Committee

in Doha
- Competitors: 132 in 23 sports
- Flag bearer: Alain Saade
- Medals Ranked 26th: Gold 1 Silver 0 Bronze 2 Total 3

Asian Games appearances (overview)
- 1978; 1982; 1986; 1990; 1994; 1998; 2002; 2006; 2010; 2014; 2018; 2022; 2026

Lebanon participated in the 15th Asian Games, officially known as the XV Asiad held in Doha, Qatar from December 1 to December 15, 2006. Lebanon ranked 26th with a lone gold medal and 2 bronze medals in this edition of the Asiad.

== Medalists ==
Medal	Name	Sport	Event	Date
Gold	Jean-Claude Rabbath	Athletics	Men's high jump	9
Bronze	Talih Bou-Kamel; Joseph Hanna; Joe Salem	Shooting	Men's trap team	3
Bronze	Cosette Basbous	Taekwondo	Women's 55 kg	9
