= Kyrgyzstan at the 2006 Asian Games =

- IOC code: KGZ
- NOC: National Olympic Committee of the Republic of Kyrgyzstan

in Doha
- Medals Ranked 28th: Gold 0 Silver 2 Bronze 6 Total 8

Asian Games appearances (overview)
- 1994; 1998; 2002; 2006; 2010; 2014; 2018; 2022; 2026

Kyrgyzstan participated at the 2006 Asian Games held in Doha, Qatar from December 1 to December 15, 2006. Kyrgyzstan ranked 28th with 2 silver medals and 6 bronze medals in this edition of the Asiad.

== Medalists ==
Medal	Name	Sport	Event	Date
Silver	Eugen Wacker	Cycling	Men's individual time trial	5
Silver	Tatyana Efimenko	Athletics	Women's high jump	11
Bronze	Ruslan Tyumenbayev	Wrestling	Men's Greco-Roman 60 kg	9
Bronze	Daniar Kobonov	Wrestling	Men's Greco-Roman 74 kg	9
Bronze	Janarbek Kenjeev	Wrestling	Men's Greco-Roman 84 kg	10
Bronze	Nurbek Ibragimov	Wrestling	Men's Greco-Roman 120 kg	10
Bronze	Iana Panova	Wrestling	Women's freestyle 72 kg	11
Bronze	Aleksey Krupnyakov	Wrestling	Men's freestyle 96 kg	13
