= Syria at the 2006 Asian Games =

- IOC code: SYR
- NOC: Syrian Olympic Committee

in Doha
- Flag bearer: Ahed Joughili
- Medals Ranked 23rd: Gold 2 Silver 2 Bronze 2 Total 6

Asian Games appearances (overview)
- 1951; 1954; 1958; 1962; 1966; 1970; 1974; 1978; 1982; 1986; 1990; 1994; 1998; 2002; 2006; 2010; 2014; 2018; 2022; 2026

Syria competed at the 2006 Asian Games in Doha, Qatar. It won a total of 6 medals.

== Medals ==
=== Gold ===
Swimming

- Men's 50 m Freestyle: Rafd Zyad Al-Masri 4

Weightlifting

- Men's 105 kg: Ahed Joughili 6

=== Silver ===
Bodybuilding

- Men's 90 Kilograms: Hassan Al-Saka 9

Karate

- Men's Kumite 70 kg: Nawras Al-Hamawi

13

=== Bronze ===
Wrestling

- Men's Greco-Roman 96 kg: Muhammad Al Ken 9

Boxing

- Men's Heavyweight 91 kg: Naser Al-Shami 12

== See also ==
- Syria at the 2005 Mediterranean Games
