= Kazakhstan at the 2006 Asian Games =

- IOC code: KAZ
- NOC: National Olympic Committee of the Republic of Kazakhstan

in Doha
- Competitors: 338
- Flag bearer: Bakhtiyar Artayev
- Medals Ranked 4th: Gold 23 Silver 20 Bronze 42 Total 85

Asian Games appearances (overview)
- 1994; 1998; 2002; 2006; 2010; 2014; 2018; 2022; 2026

Kazakhstan competed at the 2006 Asian Games, held in Doha, Qatar, from December 1 to 15, 2006 and ranked 4th with 23 gold medals.
