= 2003 US Open – Women's singles qualifying =

Women's singles qualifying
- 2003 US Open

Events
Singles	men	women		boys	girls
Doubles	men	women	mixed	boys	girls
WC Singles	men	women	quad
WC Doubles	men	women	quad
Legends	men	women	mixed

Qualification
Singles	men	women
- US Open

This article displays the qualifying draw for the Women's Singles at the 2003 US Open.

== Seeds ==
1. (Croatia) Jelena Kostanić Tošić (qualified)
2. (Spain) Anabel Medina Garrigues (second round)
3. (United States) Lindsay Lee-Waters (first round)
4. (Russia) Alina Jidkova (qualified)
5. (Czech Republic) Sandra Kleinová (second round)
6. (Italy) Adriana Serra Zanetti (qualifying competition, lucky loser)
7. (Puerto Rico) Kristina Brandi (qualifying competition)
8. (Israel) Tzipora Obziler (first round)
9. (Germany) Julia Schruff (first round)
10. (Australia) Evie Dominikovic (first round)
11. (Netherlands) Seda Noorlander (first round)
12. (Venezuela) Milagros Sequera (qualified)
13. (Czech Republic) Renata Voráčová (first round)
14. (Canada) Maureen Drake (qualified)
15. (Paraguay) Rossana de los Ríos (second round)
16. (Czech Republic) Eva Birnerová (second round)
17. (Belarus) Olga Barabanschikova (first round)
18. (Belarus) Tatiana Poutchek (qualified)
19. (Italy) Mara Santangelo (qualified)
20. (Russia) Anastasia Rodionova (first round)
21. (Hungary) Anikó Kapros (qualified)
22. (Russia) Evgenia Kulikovskaya (first round)
23. (United States) Mashona Washington (second round)
24. (United States) Tara Snyder (first round)
25. (Sweden) Sofia Arvidsson (second round)
26. (China) Zheng Jie (second round)
27. (Serbia and Montenegro) Jelena Janković (qualifying competition)
28. (Czech Republic) Michaela Paštiková (first round)
29. (Italy) Nathalie Viérin (first round)
30. (Argentina) Gisela Dulko (second round)
31. (Canada) Vanessa Webb (first round)
32. (Russia) Vera Dushevina (qualified)

== Qualifiers ==
1. (Croatia) Jelena Kostanić Tošić
2. (Hungary) Anikó Kapros
3. (Czech Republic) Alena Vašková
4. (Russia) Alina Jidkova
5. (United States) Gabriela Lastra
6. (Russia) Maria Kirilenko
7. (Colombia) Catalina Castaño
8. (Germany) Stephanie Gehrlein
9. (Russia) Vera Dushevina
10. (Ukraine) Yuliya Beygelzimer
11. (China) Sun Tiantian
12. (Venezuela) Milagros Sequera
13. (Italy) Mara Santangelo
14. (Canada) Maureen Drake
15. (Belarus) Tatiana Poutchek
16. (Argentina) María Emilia Salerni

== Lucky loser ==
1. (Italy) Adriana Serra Zanetti

== Qualifying draw ==
Key

- Q = Qualifier
- WC = Wild card
- LL = Lucky loser
- Alt = Alternate
- ITF = ITF entry
- PR = Protected ranking
- SR = Special ranking
- SE = Special exempt
- JE = Junior exempt
- JR = Junior Accelerator Programme entrant
- CO = College Accelerator Programme entrant
- NG = Next Gen Accelerator Program entrant
- w/o = Walkover
- r = Retired
- d = Defaulted

=== First qualifier ===
First round
1	(Croatia) Jelena Kostanić Tošić	6	6
(Germany) Nina Dübbers	0	0
WC	(United States) Jewel Peterson	6	3	4
(United States) Lilia Osterloh	3	6	6
(Germany) Bianka Lamade	7^{7}	7^{9}
(South Korea) Jeon Mi-ra	6^{5}	6^{7}
WC	(United States) Kelly McCain	3	6	6
31	(Canada) Vanessa Webb	6	4	3

Second round
1	(Croatia) Jelena Kostanić Tošić	6	6
(United States) Lilia Osterloh	1	1
(Germany) Bianka Lamade	6	6
WC	(United States) Kelly McCain	3	4

Qualifying competition
1	(Croatia) Jelena Kostanić Tošić	6	4	6
(Germany) Bianka Lamade	1	6	3

=== Second qualifier ===
First round
2	(Spain) Anabel Medina Garrigues	6	6
(France) Camille Pin	0	3
(Austria) Patricia Wartusch	3	6	2
(Slovakia) Jarmila Gajdošová	6	4	6
(Estonia) Kaia Kanepi	6	6
(Indonesia) Wynne Prakusya	3	4
WC	(United States) Jamea Jackson	1	1
21	(Hungary) Anikó Kapros	6	6

Second round
2	(Spain) Anabel Medina Garrigues	0	5
(Slovakia) Jarmila Gajdošová	6	7
(Estonia) Kaia Kanepi	4	2
21	(Hungary) Anikó Kapros	6	6

Qualifying competition
(Slovakia) Jarmila Gajdošová	3	2
21	(Hungary) Anikó Kapros	6	6

=== Third qualifier ===
First round
3	(United States) Lindsay Lee-Waters	5	6	4
(Czech Republic) Magdalena Zděnovcová	7	4	6
(China) Yan Zi	6	6
(United States) Sunitha Rao	3	2
(Serbia and Montenegro) Katarina Mišić	3	2
(Czech Republic) Alena Vašková	6	6
(Croatia) Ivana Abramovic	6	6
28	(Czech Republic) Michaela Paštiková	2	4

Second round
(Czech Republic) Magdalena Zděnovcová	6	6^{8}	6
(China) Yan Zi	3	7^{10}	3
(Czech Republic) Alena Vašková	1	7	6
(Croatia) Ivana Abramovic	6	5	1

Qualifying competition
(Czech Republic) Magdalena Zděnovcová	2	4
(Czech Republic) Alena Vašková	6	6

=== Fourth qualifier ===
First round
4	(Russia) Alina Jidkova	6	6
(South Africa) Natalie Grandin	4	1
(Ukraine) Alona Bondarenko	7^{12}	5	7
(Japan) Rika Fujiwara	6^{10}	7	5
(Italy) Giulia Casoni	6	1	2
(Austria) Evelyn Fauth	4	6	6
(Romania) Edina Gallovits	2	3
27	(Serbia and Montenegro) Jelena Janković	6	6

Second round
4	(Russia) Alina Jidkova	6	6
(Ukraine) Alona Bondarenko	2	3
(Austria) Evelyn Fauth	0	2
27	(Serbia and Montenegro) Jelena Janković	6	6

Qualifying competition
4	(Russia) Alina Jidkova	4	6	6
27	(Serbia and Montenegro) Jelena Janković	6	3	2

=== Fifth qualifier ===
First round
5	(Czech Republic) Sandra Kleinová	6	4	6
(Germany) Sandra Klösel	0	6	2
WC	(United States) Kristen Schlukebir	4	6	4
(United States) Gabriela Lastra	6	3	6
(Spain) Nuria Llagostera Vives	6	7^{7}
(France) Séverine Beltrame	4	6^{4}
(Czech Republic) Olga Blahotová	2	3
25	(Sweden) Sofia Arvidsson	6	6

Second round
5	(Czech Republic) Sandra Kleinová	0	2
(United States) Gabriela Lastra	6	6
(Spain) Nuria Llagostera Vives	6	2	6
25	(Sweden) Sofia Arvidsson	2	6	2

Qualifying competition
(United States) Gabriela Lastra	6	6
(Spain) Nuria Llagostera Vives	2	2

=== Sixth qualifier ===
First round
6	(Italy) Adriana Serra Zanetti	7	3	6
(Czech Republic) Libuše Prušová	5	6	1
(Netherlands) Kristie Boogert	4	4
(Australia) Samantha Stosur	6	6
(Russia) Maria Kirilenko	5	6	6
(Hungary) Katalin Marosi	7	3	1
(Chinese Taipei) Janet Lee	4	2
26	(China) Zheng Jie	6	6

Second round
6	(Italy) Adriana Serra Zanetti	7^{7}	6
(Australia) Samantha Stosur	6^{1}	3
(Russia) Maria Kirilenko	7	7^{7}
26	(China) Zheng Jie	5	6^{4}

Qualifying competition
6	(Italy) Adriana Serra Zanetti	5	1
(Russia) Maria Kirilenko	7	6

=== Seventh qualifier ===
First round
7	(Puerto Rico) Kristina Brandi	6	6
(Japan) Miho Saeki	3	2
(Argentina) Natalia Gussoni	4	2
(Ukraine) Elena Tatarkova	6	6
(France) Amandine Dulon	6	6
WC	(United States) Shadisha Robinson	3	2
(Colombia) Catalina Castaño	6	6
17	(Belarus) Olga Barabanschikova	1	1

Second round
7	(Puerto Rico) Kristina Brandi	6	6
(Ukraine) Elena Tatarkova	1	3
(France) Amandine Dulon	1	4
(Colombia) Catalina Castaño	6	6

Qualifying competition
7	(Puerto Rico) Kristina Brandi	6	1	3
(Colombia) Catalina Castaño	4	6	6

=== Eighth qualifier ===
First round
8	(Israel) Tzipora Obziler	6	5	6^{6}
(France) Virginie Pichet	2	7	7^{8}
(Russia) Olga Kalyuzhnaya	4	6	6
WC	(United States) Jessica Kirkland	6	1	2
(Germany) Angelika Bachmann	5	4
(Germany) Stephanie Gehrlein	7	6
(Hungary) Zsófia Gubacsi	7	6
22	(Russia) Evgenia Kulikovskaya	5	3

Second round
(France) Virginie Pichet	6	6
(Russia) Olga Kalyuzhnaya	4	4
(Germany) Stephanie Gehrlein	5	7^{7}	6
(Hungary) Zsófia Gubacsi	7	6^{5}	1

Qualifying competition
(France) Virginie Pichet	6	0	0
(Germany) Stephanie Gehrlein	4	6	6

=== Ninth qualifier ===
First round
9	(Germany) Julia Schruff	1	6	4
(Estonia) Maret Ani	6	2	6
(Japan) Shiho Hisamatsu	0	6^{2}
(United States) Jennifer Hopkins	6	7^{7}
(Romania) Andreea Vanc	4	6	7
(South Africa) Chanelle Scheepers	6	3	5
(Hungary) Kira Nagy	2	2
32	(Russia) Vera Dushevina	6	6

Second round
(Estonia) Maret Ani	7^{10}	6
(United States) Jennifer Hopkins	6^{8}	3
(Romania) Andreea Vanc	6	0	2
32	(Russia) Vera Dushevina	4	6	6

Qualifying competition
(Estonia) Maret Ani	2	6^{6}
32	(Russia) Vera Dushevina	6	7^{8}

=== Tenth qualifier ===
First round
10	(Australia) Evie Dominikovic	5	1
(Germany) Adriana Barna	7	6
(Australia) Christina Wheeler	6	6
(France) Sophie Lefèvre	2	1
(Czech Republic) Zuzana Hejdová	3	3
(Ukraine) Yuliya Beygelzimer	6	6
(United Kingdom) Lucie Ahl	2	7	2
30	(Argentina) Gisela Dulko	6	5	6

Second round
(Germany) Adriana Barna	4	6	4
(Australia) Christina Wheeler	6	4	6
(Ukraine) Yuliya Beygelzimer	2	6	6
30	(Argentina) Gisela Dulko	6	4	2

Qualifying competition
(Australia) Christina Wheeler	4	6	5
(Ukraine) Yuliya Beygelzimer	6	3	7

=== Eleventh qualifier ===
First round
11	(Netherlands) Seda Noorlander	2	6	3
WC	(United States) Tanner Cochran	6	3	6
(China) Sun Tiantian	6	6
(Slovakia) Gabriela Voleková	0	2
(Germany) Martina Müller	6^{8}	0
(Tunisia) Selima Sfar	7^{10}	6
(Czech Republic) Lenka Nemecková	6	7^{7}
24	(United States) Tara Snyder	3	6^{4}

Second round
WC	(United States) Tanner Cochran	4	4
(China) Sun Tiantian	6	6
(Tunisia) Selima Sfar	6	6
(Czech Republic) Lenka Nemecková	4	1

Qualifying competition
(China) Sun Tiantian	6	3	6
(Tunisia) Selima Sfar	3	6	4

=== Twelfth qualifier ===
First round
12	(Venezuela) Milagros Sequera	7^{9}	6
(Germany) Vanessa Henke	6^{7}	0
WC	(United States) Ally Baker	5	6	6
(Croatia) Mirjana Lučić	7	1	4
(United States) Teryn Ashley	6	6
(Ukraine) Yuliana Fedak	1	1
(Germany) Anna-Lena Grönefeld	7	6
20	(Russia) Anastasia Rodionova	5	2

Second round
12	(Venezuela) Milagros Sequera	7	6
WC	(United States) Ally Baker	5	2
(United States) Teryn Ashley	6	6
(Germany) Anna-Lena Grönefeld	2	2

Qualifying competition
12	(Venezuela) Milagros Sequera	6	6
(United States) Teryn Ashley	4	2

=== Thirteenth qualifier ===
First round
13	(Czech Republic) Renata Voráčová	4	2
(Czech Republic) Barbora Strýcová	6	6
(Japan) Yuka Yoshida	7^{7}	6
(Netherlands) Anousjka van Exel	6^{5}	3
(Bulgaria) Lubomira Bacheva	7	6
(Czech Republic) Jana Hlaváčková	5	4
(United Kingdom) Jane O'Donoghue	2	6	3
19	(Italy) Mara Santangelo	6	4	6

Second round
(Czech Republic) Barbora Strýcová	7	6
(Japan) Yuka Yoshida	5	2
(Bulgaria) Lubomira Bacheva	0	7^{7}	4
19	(Italy) Mara Santangelo	6	6^{4}	6

Qualifying competition
(Czech Republic) Barbora Strýcová	2	2
19	(Italy) Mara Santangelo	6	6

=== Fourteenth qualifier ===
First round
14	(Canada) Maureen Drake	7	6
(Bulgaria) Svetlana Krivencheva	5	4
(Brazil) Maria-Fernanda Alves	6	6
(Australia) Rachel McQuillan	2	3
(Morocco) Bahia Mouhtassine	6	5	0
(United Kingdom) Anne Keothavong	4	7	6
(Canada) Marie-Ève Pelletier	6^{4}	2
23	(United States) Mashona Washington	7^{7}	6

Second round
14	(Canada) Maureen Drake	6	0	6
(Brazil) Maria-Fernanda Alves	3	6	4
(United Kingdom) Anne Keothavong	6	3	6
23	(United States) Mashona Washington	3	6	4

Qualifying competition
14	(Canada) Maureen Drake	7	6
(United Kingdom) Anne Keothavong	5	1

=== Fifteenth qualifier ===
First round
15	(Paraguay) Rossana de los Ríos	6	3
(Czech Republic) Hana Šromová	0	3^{r}
(Hungary) Rita Kuti-Kis	6	6
(Slovakia) Zuzana Kucová	4	2
(Bulgaria) Maria Geznenge	7^{7}	6^{3}	6
(United States) Meilen Tu	6^{3}	7^{7}	4
(Germany) Gréta Arn	4	3
18	(Belarus) Tatiana Poutchek	6	6

Second round
15	(Paraguay) Rossana de los Ríos	4	5
(Hungary) Rita Kuti-Kis	6	7
(Bulgaria) Maria Geznenge	3	0
18	(Belarus) Tatiana Poutchek	6	6

Qualifying competition
(Hungary) Rita Kuti-Kis	4	7^{7}	3
18	(Belarus) Tatiana Poutchek	6	6^{4}	6

=== Sixteenth qualifier ===
First round
16	(Czech Republic) Eva Birnerová	6	6^{5}	6
WC	(United States) Cory Ann Avants	1	7^{7}	3
(Republic of Ireland) Kelly Liggan	6	6
(Canada) Jana Nejedly	3	1
(Russia) Galina Fokina	7	6
(Belarus) Nadejda Ostrovskaya	5	4
(Argentina) María Emilia Salerni	6	4
29	(Italy) Nathalie Viérin	3	4^{r}

Second round
16	(Czech Republic) Eva Birnerová	6^{6}	4
(Republic of Ireland) Kelly Liggan	7^{8}	6
(Russia) Galina Fokina	6	2	0
(Argentina) María Emilia Salerni	3	6	6

Qualifying competition
(Republic of Ireland) Kelly Liggan	1	3
(Argentina) María Emilia Salerni	6	6
