= 2007 Fed Cup Asia/Oceania Zone Group I – Pool A =

Group A of the 2007 Fed Cup Asia/Oceania Zone Group I was one of two pools in the Asia/Oceania Zone Group I of the 2007 Fed Cup. Five teams competed in a round robin competition, with the top team proceeding to their respective sections of the play-offs: the top team played for advancement to the World Group II Play-offs.

		(Thailand) THA	(South Korea) KOR	(Uzbekistan) UZB	(Hong Kong) HKG	(Singapore) SIN	Match; W–L	Set; W–L	Game; W–L	Standings
20	Thailand		2–1	1–2	3–0	2–1	3–1	19–11	149–122	1
31	South Korea	1–2		1–2	1–2	2–1	1–3	12–14	113–113	4
45	Uzbekistan	2–1	2–1		1–2	3–0	3–1	16–11	135–112	2
53	Hong Kong	0–3	2–1	2–1		3–0	3–1	17–14	153–139	3
62	Singapore	1–2	1–2	0–3	0–3		0–4	7–21	83–147	5

== Thailand vs. Hong Kong ==
Thailand
3
Scenic Circles Hotel Tennis Centre, Christchurch, New Zealand
16 April 2007
Plexipave (outdoors)

Hong Kong
0

			1	2	3
1	(Thailand) (Hong Kong)	Montinee Tangphong; Zhang Ling	3; 6	6; 3	6; 4
2	(Thailand) (Hong Kong)	Napaporn Tongsalee; Chan Wing-yau	7^{7} 6^{4}	6; 4
3	(Thailand) (Hong Kong)	Napaporn Tongsalee / Nungnadda Wannasuk; Lam Po Kuen / Tong Ka-po	3; 6	6; 4	7; 5

== Uzbekistan vs. Singapore ==
Uzbekistan
3
Scenic Circles Hotel Tennis Centre, Christchurch, New Zealand
16 April 2007
Plexipave (outdoors)

Singapore
0

			1	2	3
1	(Uzbekistan) (Singapore)	Albina Khabibulina; Beier Ko	6; 2	6; 4
2	(Uzbekistan) (Singapore)	Dilyara Saidkhodjayeva; Lee Wei-ping	6; 0	6; 2
3	(Uzbekistan) (Singapore)	Albina Khabibulina / Dilyara Saidkhodjayeva; Beier Ko / Lee Wei-ping	6; 0	6; 4

== South Korea vs. Singapore ==
South Korea
2
Scenic Circles Hotel Tennis Centre, Christchurch, New Zealand
17 April 2007
Plexipave (outdoors)

Singapore
1

			1	2	3
1	(South Korea) (Singapore)	Lee Jin-a; Beier Ko	4; 6	3; 6
2	(South Korea) (Singapore)	Cho Eun-hye; Lee Wei-ping	6; 1	6; 1
3	(South Korea) (Singapore)	Lee Ye-ra / Yoo Mi; Beier Ko / Lee Wei-ping	6; 2	6; 3

== Uzbekistan vs. Hong Kong ==
Uzbekistan
3
Scenic Circles Hotel Tennis Centre, Christchurch, New Zealand
17 April 2007
Plexipave (outdoors)

Hong Kong
0

			1	2	3
1	(Uzbekistan) (Hong Kong)	Akgul Amanmuradova; Zhang Ling	3; 6	3; 6
2	(Uzbekistan) (Hong Kong)	Iroda Tulyaganova; Chan Wing-yau	3; 6	6; 1	5; 7
3	(Uzbekistan) (Hong Kong)	Albina Khabibulina / Dilyara Saidkhodjayeva; Lam Po Kuen / Tong Ka-po	6; 2	5; 7	3; 3	retired

== Thailand vs. Singapore ==
Thailand
2
Scenic Circles Hotel Tennis Centre, Christchurch, New Zealand
18 April 2007
Plexipave (outdoors)

Singapore
1

			1	2	3
1	(Thailand) (Singapore)	Nungnadda Wannasuk; Beier Ko	6; 2	3; 6	2; 6
2	(Thailand) (Singapore)	Tamarine Tanasugarn; Lee Wei-ping	6; 1	6; 0
3	(Thailand) (Singapore)	Montinee Tangphong / Napaporn Tongsalee; Beier Ko / Lee Wei-ping	2; 6	6; 4	6; 0

== South Korea vs. Uzbekistan ==
South Korea
1
Scenic Circles Hotel Tennis Centre, Christchurch, New Zealand
18 April 2007
Plexipave (outdoors)

Uzbekistan
2

			1	2	3
1	(South Korea) (Uzbekistan)	Lee Ye-ra; Dilyara Saidkhodjayeva	6; 1	6; 4
2	(South Korea) (Uzbekistan)	Yoo Mi; Akgul Amanmuradova	2; 6	2; 6
3	(South Korea) (Uzbekistan)	Lee Ye-ra / Yoo Mi; Akgul Amanmuradova / Iroda Tulyaganova	3; 6	5; 7

== Thailand vs. Uzbekistan ==
Thailand
1
Scenic Circles Hotel Tennis Centre, Christchurch, New Zealand
19 April 2007
Plexipave (outdoors)

Uzbekistan
2

			1	2	3
1	(Thailand) (Uzbekistan)	Montinee Tangphong; Akgul Amanmuradova	7^{7} 6^{5}	3; 6	2; 6
2	(Thailand) (Uzbekistan)	Tamarine Tanasugarn; Iroda Tulyaganova	6; 3	6; 2
3	(Thailand) (Uzbekistan)	Tamarine Tanasugarn / Napaporn Tongsalee; Akgul Amanmuradova / Iroda Tulyaganova	4; 6	6; 0	4; 6

== South Korea vs. Hong Kong ==
South Korea
1
Scenic Circles Hotel Tennis Centre, Christchurch, New Zealand
19 April 2007
Plexipave (outdoors)

Hong Kong
2

			1	2	3
1	(South Korea) (Hong Kong)	Lee Ye-ra; Zhang Ling	6; 3	4; 6	2; 6
2	(South Korea) (Hong Kong)	Yoo Mi; Chan Wing-yau	7; 5	6; 1
3	(South Korea) (Hong Kong)	Lee Ye-ra / Yoo Mi; Tong Ka-po / Zhang Ling	3; 6	6; 1	0; 6

== Thailand vs. South Korea ==
Thailand
2
Scenic Circles Hotel Tennis Centre, Christchurch, New Zealand
20 April 2007
Plexipave (outdoors)

South Korea
1

			1	2	3
1	(Thailand) (South Korea)	Montinee Tangphong; Cho Eun-hye	6; 2	6; 3
2	(Thailand) (South Korea)	Tamarine Tanasugarn; Yoo Mi	6; 3	6; 4
3	(Thailand) (South Korea)	Tamarine Tanasugarn / Napaporn Tongsalee; Lee Ye-ra / Yoo Mi	4; 6	2; 6

== Hong Kong vs. Singapore ==
Hong Kong
3
Scenic Circles Hotel Tennis Centre, Christchurch, New Zealand
20 April 2007
Plexipave (outdoors)

Singapore
0

			1	2	3
1	(Hong Kong) (Singapore)	Zhang Ling; Beier Ko	6; 3	1; 6	6; 2
2	(Hong Kong) (Singapore)	Chan Wing-yau; Lee Wei-ping	6; 2	6; 2
3	(Hong Kong) (Singapore)	Chan Wing-yau / Lam Po Kuen; Celina Goetti / Stefanie Tan	6; 2	6^{5} 7^{7}	6; 3

== See also ==
- Fed Cup structure
