= Khwarrahbud =

4th-century Persian scribe

Khwarrahbud was a 4th-century scribe (dabir) active during the reign of the Sasanian king (shah) Shapur II (r. 309–379). Captured by the Romans and sent to stay in their territory, Khwarrahbud wrote a book on the accomplishments of Shapur II and Julian, and also learned Greek. He made a Greek translation of a Middle Persian book written by Rāstsakhwan, one of his captive associates. The 6th-century Roman historian Agathias later used this book.

== Sources ==
- Rajabzadeh, Hashem (1993). "Dabīr". Encyclopaedia Iranica, Vol. VI, Fasc. 5. pp. 534–539.
