= Beier Ko =

Singaporean tennis player

- Country (sports): Canada (2001-2005); Singapore (2006-2007)
- Born: 17 July 1986 (age 40) Singapore
- Retired: 2007
- Plays: Right-handed (two-handed backhand)
- College: Harvard University
- Prize money: 28,315

Singles
- Career record: 62–59
- Career titles: 1 ITF
- Highest ranking: No. 299 (14 June 2004)

Grand Slam singles results
- Australian Open Junior: QF (2003)
- French Open Junior: 1R (2003)
- Wimbledon Junior: 2R (2003)
- US Open Junior: 2R (2003)

Doubles
- Career record: 8–15
- Highest ranking: No. 329 (12 August 2002)

Grand Slam doubles results
- Australian Open Junior: QF (2001)
- French Open Junior: 1R (2003)
- US Open Junior: 2R (2002)

Team competitions
- Fed Cup: 3–5

Beier Ko (born 17 July 1986) is a Singaporean former professional tennis player. Ko had previously played for Canada before representing Singapore.

== Tennis career ==
Ko won the singles title in 2002 on the ITF Women's Circuit in Toronto, Canada. In 2004, she achieved a singles ranking of #299 on the WTA Tour at 17 years old.

Ko decided to follow the college route and played for the Harvard University Crimson varsity tennis team from 2007 to 2009. In 2009, Ko was undefeated and unanimously named Ivy League Player of the Year. She was also named to the All-Ivy first team in singles and doubles.

Ko then played for Singapore at the 2007 Fed Cup, Ko has accumulated a win–loss record of 3–2.

== Personal ==
Ko was born in Singapore but moved with her family to Canada when she was four years old. In 2005, she exchanged her Canadian passport for Singapore and represented Singapore in the 2007 Fed Cup.

== ITF Finals ==
=== Singles (1 titles, 2 runner–ups) ===
Result	W–L	Date	Tournament	Tier	Surface	Opponent	Score
Win	1–0	Aug 2008	ITF Toronto, Canada	10,000	Hard	(Australia) Christina Horiatopoulos	6–2, 6–2
Loss	1–1	Jun 2002	ITF Lachine, Canada	10,000	Hard	(Canada) Aleksandra Wozniak	0–6, 3–6
Loss	1–2	Jun 2003	ITF Hamilton, Canada	25,000	Clay	(Germany) Anna-Lena Grönefeld	3–6, 3–6

== Fed Cup participation ==
=== Singles ===
Edition	Stage	Date	Location	Against	Surface	Opponent	W/L	Score
2007 Fed Cup; Asia/Oceania Zone Group I	R/R	16 April 2007	Christchurch, New Zealand	(Uzbekistan) Uzbekistan	Hard	(Uzbekistan) Albina Khabibulina	L	2–6, 4–6
2007 Fed Cup; Asia/Oceania Zone Group I	R/R	17 April 2007	Christchurch, New Zealand	South Korea	Hard	(South Korea) Lee Jin-a	W	6–4, 6–3
2007 Fed Cup; Asia/Oceania Zone Group I	R/R	18 April 2007	Christchurch, New Zealand	Thailand	Hard	(Thailand) Nungnadda Wannasuk	W	2–6, 6–3, 6–2
2007 Fed Cup; Asia/Oceania Zone Group I	R/R	20 April 2007	Christchurch, New Zealand	Hong Kong	Hard	(Hong Kong) Zhang Ling	L	3–6, 6–1, 2–6
2007 Fed Cup; Asia/Oceania Zone Group I	P/O	21 April 2007	Christchurch, New Zealand	(Jordan) Jordan	Hard	(Jordan) Sahar Al Disi	W	6–0, 6–0

=== Doubles ===
Edition	Stage	Date	Location	Against	Surface	Partner	Opponents	W/L	Score
2007 Fed Cup; Asia/Oceania Zone Group I	R/R	16 April 2007	Christchurch, New Zealand	(Uzbekistan) Uzbekistan	Hard	(Singapore) Lee Wei-ping	(Uzbekistan) Albina Khabibulina (Uzbekistan) Dilyara Saidkhodjayeva	L	0–6, 4–6
2007 Fed Cup; Asia/Oceania Zone Group I	R/R	17 April 2007	Christchurch, New Zealand	South Korea	Hard	(Singapore) Lee Wei-ping	(South Korea) Lee Ye-ra (South Korea) Yoo Mi	L	2–6, 3–6
2007 Fed Cup; Asia/Oceania Zone Group I	R/R	18 April 2007	Christchurch, New Zealand	Thailand	Hard	(Singapore) Lee Wei-ping	(Thailand) Montinee Tangphong (Thailand) Napaporn Tongsalee	L	6–2, 4–6, 0–6

== ITF junior results ==
=== Singles (2–2) ===
Legend (Win/Loss)
Category GA
Category G1
Category G2
Category G3
Category G4
Category G5

Outcome	No.	Date	Location	Surface	Opponent	Score
Winner	1.	March 2000	Santa Tecla, El Salvador	Hard	(Canada) Genevieve Charron	7–5, 6–1
Runner-up	2.	July 2000	Tunis, Tunisia	Clay	(Netherlands) Dominique van Boekel	3–6, 3–6
Winner	3.	January 2002	Cuenca, Ecuador	Clay	(Croatia) Nika Ožegović	6–3, 6–4
Runner-up	4.	December 20002	Mérida, Mexico	Hard	(Netherlands) Michaëlla Krajicek	2–6, 1–6

=== Doubles (2–1) ===
Outcome	No.	Date	Location	Surface	Partner	Opponents	Score
Winner	1.	March 2000	Santa Tecla, El Salvador	Hard	(United States) Danielle Schwartz	(Canada) Genevieve Charron (Canada) Cynthia Goulet	6–3, 6–4
Winner	2.	July 2000	Casablanca, Morocco	Clay	(Serbia) Jelena Janković	(Slovakia) Linda Smolenaková (Netherlands) Dominique van Boekel	7–5, 4–6, 6–3
Runner-up	3.	March 2001	Lambaré, Paraguay	Hard	(Algeria) Feriel Esseghir	(Czech Republic) Eva Hrdinová (Czech Republic) Ema Janašková	3–6, 4–6
