= 2007 Fed Cup Asia/Oceania Zone Group I – play-offs =

International tennis competition play-offs

The play-offs of the 2007 Fed Cup Asia/Oceania Zone Group I were the final stages of the Zonal Competition involving teams from Asia and Oceania. Using the positions determined in their pools, the ten teams faced off to determine their placing in the 2007 Fed Cup Asia/Oceania Zone. The team that placed first overall advanced to the World Group II.

Placing	Pool A	Pool B
1	Thailand	Chinese Taipei
2	Uzbekistan	India
3	Hong Kong	New Zealand
4	South Korea	Kazakhstan
5	Singapore	Jordan

== Promotion play-offs ==
The top team of each pool was placed against each other in a head-to-head round. The winner of the round advanced to World Group II for next year.

=== Thailand vs. Chinese Taipei ===
Thailand
0
Scenic Circles Hotel Tennis Centre, Christchurch, New Zealand
21 April 2007
Plexipave (outdoors)

Chinese Taipei
3

			1	2	3
1	(Thailand) (Chinese Taipei)	Napaporn Tongsalee; Chan Chin-wei	4; 6	5; 7
2	(Thailand) (Chinese Taipei)	Tamarine Tanasugarn; Hsieh Su-wei	6; 4	5; 7	4; 6
3	(Thailand) (Chinese Taipei)	Montinee Tangphong / Nungnadda Wannasuk; Hsu Wen-hsin / Hwang I-hsuan	6^{2} 7^{7}	2; 6

== Third to Fourth play-offs ==
The second-placed teams from each pool were drawn in head-to-head rounds to find the third and fourth placed teams.

=== Uzbekistan vs. India ===
Uzbekistan
3
Scenic Circles Hotel Tennis Centre, Christchurch, New Zealand
21 April 2007
Plexipave (outdoors)

India
0

			1	2	3
1	(Uzbekistan) (India)	Albina Khabibulina; Tara Iyer	6; 4	7^{7} 6^{3}
2	(Uzbekistan) (India)	Dilyara Saidkhodjayeva; Ankita Bhambri	6; 4	6; 4
3	(Uzbekistan) (India)	Albina Khabibulina / Dilyara Saidkhodjayeva; Ankita Bhambri / Tara Iyer	3; 6	7; 5	7^{13} 6^{11}

== Fifth to Sixth play-offs ==
The third-placed teams from each pool were drawn in head-to-head rounds to find the fifth and sixth placed teams.

=== Hong Kong vs. New Zealand ===
Hong Kong
1
Scenic Circles Hotel Tennis Centre, Christchurch, New Zealand
21 April 2007
Plexipave (outdoors)

New Zealand
2

			1	2	3
1	(Hong Kong) (New Zealand)	Zhang Ling; Sacha Jones	2; 6	7; 5	1; 6
2	(Hong Kong) (New Zealand)	Chan Wing-yau; Leanne Baker	4; 6	6; 3	6; 3
3	(Hong Kong) (New Zealand)	Chan Wing-yau / Tong Ka-po; Leanne Baker / Dianne Hollands	4; 6	5; 7

== Seventh to Eighth play-offs ==
The fourth-placed teams from each pool were drawn in head-to-head rounds to find the seventh and eighth placed teams.

=== South Korea vs. Kazakhstan ===
South Korea
3
Scenic Circles Hotel Tennis Centre, Christchurch, New Zealand
21 April 2007
Plexipave (outdoors)

Kazakhstan
0

			1	2	3
1	(South Korea) (Kazakhstan)	Lee Ye-ra; Tatyana Ignatchenko	6; 0	6; 1
2	(South Korea) (Kazakhstan)	Yoo Mi; Mariya Kovaleva	6; 3	6; 4
3	(South Korea) (Kazakhstan)	Cho Eun-hye / Lee Jin-a; Tatyana Ignatchenko / Mariya Kovaleva	6; 2	6; 1

== Ninth to Tenth play-offs ==
The fifth-placed teams from each pool were drawn in head-to-head rounds to find the ninth and tenth placed teams.

=== Singapore vs. Jordan ===
Singapore
3
Scenic Circles Hotel Tennis Centre, Christchurch, New Zealand
21 April 2007
Plexipave (outdoors)

Jordan
0

			1	2	3
1	(Singapore) (Jordan)	Beier Ko; Sahar Al Disi	6; 0	6; 0
2	(Singapore) (Jordan)	Lee Wei-ping; Leen Irani	6; 1	6; 3
3	(Singapore) (Jordan)	Celina Goetti / Stefanie Tan; Sahar Al Disi / Leen Irani	6; 0	6; 0

== Final Placements ==
Placing	Teams
Promoted	Chinese Taipei
Second	Thailand
Third	Uzbekistan
Fourth	India
Fifth	New Zealand
Sixth	Hong Kong
Seventh	South Korea
Eighth	Kazakhstan
Ninth	Singapore
Tenth	Jordan

- Chinese Taipei advanced to the World Group II play-offs, and were drawn against Croatia, where they lost 2–3. The team thus fell back to Group I for the next year.

== See also ==
- Fed Cup structure
