= Theresa Logar =

American tennis player

- Country (sports): United States
- Born: March 10, 1985 (age 40)
- Height: 5 ft 9 in (175 cm)
- Plays: Left-handed
- Prize money: $21,878

Singles
- Career record: 25–31
- Highest ranking: No. 529 (Oct 20, 2008)

Grand Slam singles results
- US Open: 1R (2003)

Doubles
- Career record: 2–7
- Highest ranking: No. 999 (Sep 22, 2008)

Theresa Logar (born March 10, 1985), now Theresa Mullane, is an American former professional tennis player.

A left-handed player from Rochester Hills, Michigan, Logar earned a wildcard into the women's singles main draw of the 2003 US Open by winning the USTA 18s National Championships and was beaten in the first round by Maria Kirilenko.

Logar was a varsity tennis player at Stanford University while studying for a degree in international relations.

== ITF finals ==
=== Singles: 2 (0–2) ===
Outcome	No.	Date	Tournament	Surface	Opponent	Score
Runner-up	1.	May 2008	ITF Sumter	Hard	(United States) Mallory Cecil	6–3, 6–7, 4–6
Runner-up	2.	Jun 2008	ITF Hilton Head	Hard	(United States) Mallory Cecil	2–6, 6–3, 2–6
