= 2003 US Open – Girls' singles =

Girls' singles
- 2003 US Open

Final
- Champion: (Belgium) Kirsten Flipkens
- Runner-up: (Netherlands) Michaëlla Krajicek
- Score: 6–3, 7–5

Events
Singles	men	women		boys	girls
Doubles	men	women	mixed	boys	girls
WC Singles	men	women	quad
WC Doubles	men	women	quad
Legends	men	women	mixed
- US Open

Maria Kirilenko was the defending champion, but did not compete in the juniors that year.

Kirsten Flipkens won the tournament, defeating Michaëlla Krajicek in the final, 6–3, 7–5.

== Seeds ==
1. (United States) Bethanie Mattek (third round)
2. (Netherlands) Michaëlla Krajicek (final)
3. (Slovakia) Jarmila Gajdosova (first round)
4. (Belgium) Kirsten Flipkens (champion)
5. (France) Tatiana Golovin (quarterfinals)
6. (Czech Republic) Kateřina Böhmová (first round)
7. (Poland) Marta Domachowska (third round)
8. (United States) Allison Baker (second round)
9. (Serbia and Montenegro) Vojislava Lukić (first round)
10. (Finland) Emma Laine (third round)
11. (Czech Republic) Andrea Hlaváčková (third round)
12. (Japan) Ryōko Fuda (quarterfinals)
13. (Canada) Bei'er Ko (second round)
14. (Croatia) Nadja Pavic (second round)
15. (Ukraine) Kateryna Bondarenko (semifinals)
16. (Russia) Anna Chakvetadze (second round)

== Draw ==
Key

- Q = Qualifier
- WC = Wild card
- LL = Lucky loser
- Alt = Alternate
- ITF = ITF entry
- PR = Protected ranking
- SR = Special ranking
- SE = Special exempt
- JE = Junior exempt
- JR = Junior Accelerator Programme entrant
- CO = College Accelerator Programme entrant
- NG = Next Gen Accelerator Program entrant
- w/o = Walkover
- r = Retired
- d = Defaulted

=== Finals ===
Quarterfinals
15	(Ukraine) Kateryna Bondarenko	6	6^{3}	7^{7}
12	(Japan) Ryōko Fuda	4	7^{7}	6^{4}
4	(Belgium) Kirsten Flipkens	6	4	6
(Belarus) Olga Govortsova	1	6	3
(Serbia and Montenegro) Ana Ivanovic	2	4
Q	(United States) Cory Ann Avants	6	6
5	(France) Tatiana Golovin	1	4
2	(Netherlands) Michaëlla Krajicek	6	6

Semifinals
15	(Ukraine) Kateryna Bondarenko	1	6	2
4	(Belgium) Kirsten Flipkens	6	4	6
Q	(United States) Cory Ann Avants	2	2
2	(Netherlands) Michaëlla Krajicek	6	6

Final
4	(Belgium) Kirsten Flipkens	6	7
2	(Netherlands) Michaëlla Krajicek	3	5

=== Top half ===
==== Section 1 ====
First round
1	(United States) Bethanie Mattek	6	6
Q	(India) Tara Iyer	0	4
(Egypt) Haidy El Tabakh	3	6^{4}
Q	(United States) Lindsay Burdette	6	7^{7}
(Canada) Katarina Zoricic	?	6
Q	(United States) Neha Uberoi	?	4
(Russia) Alla Kudryavtseva	7^{7}	3	2
15	(Ukraine) Kateryna Bondarenko	6^{3}	6	6
12	(Japan) Ryōko Fuda	4	6	6
WC	(United States) Alexa Glatch	6	2	3
WC	(United States) Mary Gambale	5	6	6
WC	(United States) Jessica Kirkland	7	0	4
(Czech Republic) Lucie Šafářová	7	7
(United States) Michelle Mitchell	5	5
Q	(United States) Jessi Robinson	5	0
7	(Poland) Marta Domachowska	7	6

Second round
1	(United States) B Mattek	6	5	6
Q	(United States) L Burdette	3	7	2
(Canada) K Zoricic	4	4
15	(Ukraine) K Bondarenko	6	6
12	(Japan) R Fuda	6	6
WC	(United States) M Gambale	3	3
(Czech Republic) L Šafářová	3	5
7	(Poland) M Domachowska	6	7

Third round
1	(United States) B Mattek	0	6	4
15	(Ukraine) K Bondarenko	6	4	6
12	(Japan) R Fuda	6	6
7	(Poland) M Domachowska	4	4

Quarterfinals
15	(Ukraine) K Bondarenko	6	6^{3}	7^{7}
12	(Japan) R Fuda	4	7^{7}	6^{4}

==== Section 2 ====
First round
4	(Belgium) Kirsten Flipkens	6	6
(United States) Julia Cohen	3	1
WC	(United States) Audra Cohen	1	6^{5}
WC	(United States) Vania King	6	7^{7}
(Croatia) Sanja Ančić	3	6	6
WC	(United States) Alexandra Mueller	6	4	4
(Jamaica) Megan Moulton-Levy	2	4
13	(Canada) Beier Ko	6	6
9	(Serbia and Montenegro) Vojislava Lukić	2	2
(United States) Jamea Jackson	6	6
(India) Sanaa Bhambri	2	0^{r}
(Belarus) Olga Govortsova	6	3
WC	(United States) Theresa Logar	6	6
(Romania) Mădălina Gojnea	3	1
(China) Sun Sheng-Nan	7	6
6	(Czech Republic) Kateřina Böhmová	5	3

Second round
4	(Belgium) K Flipkens	6	6
WC	(United States) V King	1	1
(Croatia) S Ančić	6	3	6
13	(Canada) B Ko	4	6	2
(United States) J Jackson	4	6	2
(Belarus) O Govortsova	6	4	6
WC	(United States) T Logar	1	6^{2}
(China) S-N Sun	6	7^{7}

Third round
4	(Belgium) K Flipkens	6	6
(Croatia) S Ančić	0	2
(Belarus) O Govortsova	6	6
(China) S-N Sun	2	2

Quarterfinals
4	(Belgium) K Flipkens	6	4	6
(Belarus) O Govortsova	1	6	3

=== Bottom half ===
==== Section 3 ====
First round
8	(United States) Allison Baker	6	6
(Sweden) Mari Andersson	1	1
(Switzerland) Timea Bacsinszky	6	1	2
(Serbia and Montenegro) Ana Ivanovic	3	6	6
Q	(United States) Jennifer-Lee Heinser	0	6^{4}
(Hungary) Ágnes Szávay	6	7^{7}
(New Zealand) Eden Marama	3	3
11	(Czech Republic) Andrea Hlaváčková	6	6
16	(Russia) Anna Chakvetadze	6	6
(Bulgaria) Sessil Karatantcheva	0	1
(United States) Megan Falcon	4	4
(Israel) Shahar Pe'er	6	6
(Canada) Aleksandra Wozniak	6	6^{2}	2
(China) Peng Shuai	4	7^{7}	6
Q	(United States) Cory Ann Avants	6^{6}	6	6
3	(Slovakia) Jarmila Gajdosova	7^{8}	4	3

Second round
8	(United States) A Baker	6	3	5
(Serbia and Montenegro) A Ivanovic	2	6	7
(Hungary) Á Szávay	2	2
11	(Czech Republic) A Hlaváčková	6	6
16	(Russia) A Chakvetadze	6^{6}	2
(Israel) S Pe'er	7^{8}	6
(China) S Peng	6	5	6^{6}
Q	(United States) CA Avants	2	7	7^{8}

Third round
(Serbia and Montenegro) A Ivanovic	6	6
11	(Czech Republic) A Hlaváčková	4	0
(Israel) S Pe'er	2	3
Q	(United States) CA Avants	6	6

Quarterfinals
(Serbia and Montenegro) A Ivanovic	2	4
Q	(United States) CA Avants	6	6

==== Section 4 ====
First round
5	(France) Tatiana Golovin	7^{7}	6
Q	(Russia) Olga Puchkova	6^{4}	3
(Romania) Ágnes Szatmári	3	2
(United States) Iris Ichim	6	6
(Australia) Lara Giltinan	3	2
(India) Sania Mirza	6	6
Q	(United States) Ellah Nze	2	0
10	(Finland) Emma Laine	6	6
14	(Croatia) Nadja Pavic	6	6
(Chinese Taipei) Yung-Jan Chan	0	3
(China) Rui Du	2	4
(Czech Republic) Nicole Vaidišová	6	6
(Ukraine) Olena Tsutskova	6	1	6
WC	(United States) Elizabeth Kobak	2	6	3
(United States) Krystina Marcio	2	1
2	(Netherlands) Michaëlla Krajicek	6	6

Second round
5	(France) T Golovin	6	6
(United States) I Ichim	3	1
(India) S Mirza	2	4
10	(Finland) E Laine	6	6
14	(Croatia) N Pavic	2	2
(Czech Republic) N Vaidišová	6	6
(Ukraine) O Tsutskova	4	1
2	(Netherlands) M Krajicek	6	6

Third round
5	(France) T Golovin	6	6
10	(Finland) E Laine	2	2
(Czech Republic) N Vaidišová	2	3
2	(Netherlands) M Krajicek	6	6

Quarterfinals
5	(France) T Golovin	1	4
2	(Netherlands) M Krajicek	6	6

== Sources ==
- Draw
