= 2005 Fed Cup Asia/Oceania Zone Group II – Pool =

The Pool of the 2005 Fed Cup Asia/Oceania Zone Group II composed of four teams competing in a round robin competition. The top two teams qualifying for Group I next year.

| | | (Uzbekistan) UZB | (Philippines) PHI | (Syria) SYR | (Turkmenistan) TKM | RR; W–L | Set; W–L | Game; W–L | Standings |
| 53 | Uzbekistan | | 3–0 | 3–0 | 3–0 | 3–0 | 18–1 | 113–28 | 1 |
| 64 | Philippines | 0–3 | | 3–0 | 3–0 | 2–1 | 13–6 | 95–50 | 2 |
| 79 | Syria | 0–3 | 0–3 | | 2–1 | 1–2 | 4–14 | 36–94 | 3 |
| 91 | Turkmenistan | 0–3 | 0–3 | 1–2 | | 0–3 | 2–16 | 28–100 | 4 |

== Uzbekistan vs. Philippines ==
Uzbekistan
3
R.K. Khanna Tennis Complex, New Delhi, India
19 April 2005
Decoturf (outdoors)

Philippines
0

| | | | 1 | 2 | 3 |
|---|---|---|---|---|---|
| 1 | (Uzbekistan) (Philippines) | Ivanna Israilova; Anja-Vanessa Peter | 4; 6 | 6; 2 | 7; 5 |
| 2 | (Uzbekistan) (Philippines) | Akgul Amanmuradova; Czarina-Mae Arévalo | 6; 0 | 6; 2 |
| 3 | (Uzbekistan) (Philippines) | Akgul Amanmuradova / Dilyara Saidkhodjayeva; Czarina-Mae Arévalo / Denise Dy | 6; 4 | 6; 4 |

== Syria vs. Turkmenistan ==
Syria
2
R.K. Khanna Tennis Complex, New Delhi, India
19 April 2005
Decoturf (outdoors)

Turkmenistan
1

| | | | 1 | 2 | 3 |
|---|---|---|---|---|---|
| 1 | (Syria) (Turkmenistan) | Hazar Sidki; Ummarahmat Hummetova | 2; 6 | 2; 6 |
| 2 | (Syria) (Turkmenistan) | Shaza Tinawi; Almira Hallyeva | 6; 3 | 6; 3 |
| 3 | (Syria) (Turkmenistan) | Hazar Sidki / Shaza Tinawi; Ummarahmat Hummetova / Almira Hallyeva | 6; 1 | 6; 3 |

== Uzbekistan vs. Syria ==
Uzbekistan
3
R.K. Khanna Tennis Complex, New Delhi, India
20 April 2005
Decoturf (outdoors)

Syria
0

| | | | 1 | 2 | 3 |
|---|---|---|---|---|---|
| 1 | (Uzbekistan) (Syria) | Dilyara Saidkhodjayeva; Nivin Kezbari | 6; 0 | 6; 0 |
| 2 | (Uzbekistan) (Syria) | Akgul Amanmuradova; Shaza Tinawi | 6; 0 | 6; 0 |
| 3 | (Uzbekistan) (Syria) | Akgul Amanmuradova / Dilyara Saidkhodjayeva; Nivin Kezbari / Hazar Sidki | 6; 1 | 6; 2 |

== Philippines vs. Turkmenistan ==
Philippines
3
R.K. Khanna Tennis Complex, New Delhi, India
20 April 2005
Decoturf (outdoors)

Turkmenistan
0

| | | | 1 | 2 | 3 |
|---|---|---|---|---|---|
| 1 | (Philippines) (Turkmenistan) | Denise Dy; Inna Gavrilenko | 6; 1 | 6; 0 |
| 2 | (Philippines) (Turkmenistan) | Anja-Vanessa Peter; Almira Hallyeva | 6; 1 | 6; 1 |
| 3 | (Philippines) (Turkmenistan) | Czarina-Mae Arévalo / Denise Dy; Ummarahmat Hummetova / Almira Hallyeva | 6; 1 | 6; 0 |

== Uzbekistan vs. Turkmenistan ==
Uzbekistan
3
R.K. Khanna Tennis Complex, New Delhi, India
21 April 2005
Decoturf (outdoors)

Turkmenistan
0

| | | | 1 | 2 | 3 |
|---|---|---|---|---|---|
| 1 | (Uzbekistan) (Turkmenistan) | Dilyara Saidkhodjayeva; Ummarahmat Hummetova | 6; 0 | 6; 0 |
| 2 | (Uzbekistan) (Turkmenistan) | Akgul Amanmuradova; Almira Hallyeva | 6; 0 | 6; 2 |
| 3 | (Uzbekistan) (Turkmenistan) | Akgul Amanmuradova / Dilyara Saidkhodjayeva; Ummarahmat Hummetova / Almira Hallyeva | 6; 0 | 6; 0 |

== Philippines vs. Syria ==
Philippines
3
R.K. Khanna Tennis Complex, New Delhi, India
21 April 2005
Decoturf (outdoors)

Syria
0

| | | | 1 | 2 | 3 |
|---|---|---|---|---|---|
| 1 | (Philippines) (Syria) | Denise Dy; Hazar Sidki | 6; 0 | 6; 0 |
| 2 | (Philippines) (Syria) | Anja-Vanessa Peter; Shaza Tinawi | 6; 0 | 6; 3 |
| 3 | (Philippines) (Syria) | Czarina-Mae Arévalo / Denise Dy; Nivin Kezbari / Hazar Sidki | 6; 1 | 6; 1 |

- Uzbekistan and Philippines advanced to Group I for next year. Uzbekistan placed fourth, whereas Philippines placed sixth, and was thus relegated back down to Group II for 2007.

== See also ==
- Fed Cup structure
