= Dilyara Saidkhodjayeva =

Uzbekistani tennis player (born 1990)

- Country (sports): Uzbekistan
- Born: 29 January 1990 (age 35) Tashkent, Uzbekistan
- Retired: 2010
- Plays: Right-handed (two-handed backhand)
- Prize money: $8,107

Singles
- Highest ranking: No. 886 (16 July 2007)

Doubles
- Highest ranking: No. 664 (7 July 2008)

Team competitions
- Fed Cup: 10–1
Medal record
Asian Games
Bronze medal – third place	2006 Doha	Women's team

Dilyara Saidkhodjayeva (born 29 January 1990) is an Uzbekistani former professional tennis player.

Saidkhodjayeva has career-high WTA rankings of 886 in singles, achieved on 16 July 2007, and 664 in doubles, set on 7 July 2008.

Her only WTA Tour main-draw appearance came at the Tashkent Open where she partnered Albina Khabibulina in the doubles event. They lost in the quarterfinals to Italian Maria Elena Camerin and Swiss Emmanuelle Gagliardi.

Saidkhodjayeva retired from professional tour in 2010.

Playing for Uzbekistan in Fed Cup, she has a win–loss record of 10–1.

== ITF Circuit finals ==
=== Doubles (0–1) ===
Legend
$25,000 tournaments
$15,000 tournaments

Result	Date	Tournament	Surface	Partner	Opponents	Score
Loss	May 2008	ITF Bangkok, Thailand	Hard	(Uzbekistan) Albina Khabibulina	(Thailand) Napaporn Tongsalee (Thailand) Suchanun Viratprasert	6–1, 6–7^{(3)}, [8–10]

== Fed Cup participation ==
=== Singles (4–1) ===
Edition	Stage	Date	Location	Against	Surface	Opponent	W/L	Score
2005 Fed Cup; Oceania Zone Group II	R/R	20 April 2005	New Delhi, India	(Syria) Syria	Hard	(Syria) Nivin Kezbari	W	6–0, 6–0
2005 Fed Cup; Oceania Zone Group II	R/R	21 April 2005	New Delhi, India	Turkmenistan	Hard	(Turkmenistan) Ummarahmat Hummetova	W	6–0, 6–0
2007 Fed Cup; Asia/Oceania Zone Group I	R/R	16 April 2007	Christchurch, New Zealand	(Singapore) Singapore	Hard	(Singapore) Lee Wei-ping	W	6–0, 6–2
2007 Fed Cup; Asia/Oceania Zone Group I	R/R	18 April 2007	Christchurch, New Zealand	South Korea	Hard	(South Korea) Lee Ye-ra	L	1–6, 4–6
2007 Fed Cup; Asia/Oceania Zone Group I	P/O	21 April 2007	Christchurch, New Zealand	India	Hard	(India) Ankita Bhambri	W	6–4, 6–4

=== Doubles (6–0) ===
Edition	Stage	Date	Location	Against	Surface	Partner	Opponents	W/L	Score
2005 Fed Cup; Asia/Oceania Zone Group II	R/R	19 April 2005	New Delhi, India	(Philippines) Philippines	Hard	(Uzbekistan) Akgul Amanmuradova	(Philippines) Czarina-Mae Arévalo (Philippines) Denise Dy	W	6-4, 6-4
2005 Fed Cup; Asia/Oceania Zone Group II	R/R	20 April 2005	New Delhi, India	Syria	Hard	(Uzbekistan) Akgul Amanmuradova	(Syria) Nivin Kezbari (Syria) Hazar Sidki	W	6-1, 6-2
2005 Fed Cup; Asia/Oceania Zone Group II	R/R	21 April 2005	New Delhi, India	Turkmenistan	Hard	(Uzbekistan) Akgul Amanmuradova	(Turkmenistan) Ummarahmat Hummetova (Turkmenistan) Almira Hallyeva	W	6-0, 6-0
2007 Fed Cup; Asia/Oceania Zone Group I	R/R	16 April 2007	Christchurch, New Zealand	(Singapore) Singapore	Hard	(Uzbekistan) Albina Khabibulina	(Singapore) Beier Ko (Singapore) Lee Wei-ping	W	6-0, 6-4
2007 Fed Cup; Asia/Oceania Zone Group I	R/R	17 April 2007	Christchurch, New Zealand	Hong Kong	Hard	(Uzbekistan) Albina Khabibulina	(Hong Kong) Lam Po Kuen (Hong Kong) Tong Ka-po	W	6-2, 5–7, 3-3 ret.
2007 Fed Cup; Asia/Oceania Zone Group I	P/O	21 April 2007	Christchurch, New Zealand	India	Hard	(Uzbekistan) Albina Khabibulina	(India) Ankita Bhambri (India) Tara Iyer	W	6-3, 7–5, 7-6^{(11)}

== ITF Junior Circuit finals ==
Legend (W/L)
Category G1
Category G2
Category G3
Category G4
Category G5

=== Singles (5–3) ===
Outcome	No.	Date	Location	Grade	Surface	Opponent	Score
Runner-up	1.	Jun 2003	Bishkek, Kyrgyzstan	G5	Clay	(Kazakhstan) Amina Rakhim	1–6, 1–6
Runner-up	2.	Aug 2003	Bishkek, Kyrgyzstan	G4	Clay	(Russia) Ekaterina Biakina	0–6, 6–7
Winner	1.	Jun 2004	Bishkek, Kyrgyzstan	G5	Clay	(Kyrgyzstan) Ksenia Palkina	6–3, 6–3
Winner	2.	Aug 2004	Almaty, Kazakhstan	G4	Hard	(Kazakhstan) Amina Rakhim	6–3, 6–3
Winner	3.	Jun 2005	Tashkent, Uzbekistan	G3	Hard	(Indonesia) Lutfiana-Aris Budiharto	6–0, 6–3
Winner	4.	Jul 2005	Cairo, Egypt	G3	Clay	(India) Sandhya Nagaraj	6–4, 6–3
Winner	5.	Sep 2005	Tashkent, Uzbekistan	G4	Hard	(Israel) Vlada Katic	6–0, 6–4
Runner-up	3.	Oct 2005	Nonthaburi, Thailand	G2	Hard	(Russia) Maya Gaverova	5–7, 4–6

=== Doubles (3–4) ===
Outcome	No.	Date	Location	Grade	Surface	Partner	Opponents	Score
Runner-up	1.	Aug 2003	Bishkek, Kyrgyzstan	G4	Clay	(Kyrgyzstan) Kanykey Koichumanova	(Kazakhstan) Mariya Kovaleva (Kazakhstan) Yekaterina Morozova	6–4, 6–7, 4–6
Runner-up	2.	Jan 2004	Rajshahi, Bangladesh	G3	Hard	(Slovenia) Tjaša Smrekar	(Chinese Taipei) Lee Ya-wen (Chinese Taipei) Lin Yu-ting	5–7, 2–6
Winner	1.	Jun 2004	Bishkek, Kyrgyzstan	G5	Clay	(Kyrgyzstan) Ksenia Palkina	(Kyrgyzstan) Kanykey Koichumanova (Uzbekistan) Diana Narzikulova	6–3, 7–6
Runner-up	3.	Aug 2004	Almaty, Kazakhstan	G4	Hard	(Russia) Daria Bykodarova	(Kazakhstan) Mariya Kovaleva (Kazakhstan) Yekaterina Morozova	1–6, 2–6
Winner	2.	Jun 2005	Namangan, Uzbekistan	G3	Hard	(Thailand) Varatchaya Wongteanchai	(Israel) Vlada Katic (Ukraine) Irina Matiychyk	6–1, 6–7, 7–5
Winner	3.	Sep 2005	Tashkent, Uzbekistan	G4	Hard	(Kazakhstan) Yekaterina Morozova	(Kazakhstan) Tatyana Ignatchenko (Uzbekistan) Nigora Sirojiddinova	6–1, 6–3
Runner-up	4.	Oct 2005	Bangkok, Thailand	G1	Hard	(Indonesia) Jessy Rompies	(Australia) Tyra Calderwood (Australia) Jessica Moore	5–7, 4–6
