= Dabir =

Dabir is a title and surname of Persian origin used in Iran and the Indian subcontinent. It is derived from the Persian word Dibīr (Middle Persian for "secretary/scribe"). Dibīr was the title of one of the four classes in the society of Sasanian Iran, which played a major role in Sasanian politics. The term fell out of favour under the Umayyad Caliphate, when Persian was replaced with Arabic as the administrative language. The title again became an administrative title as New Persian form dabīr (دبیر) when Persian was revived as the language of administration under the Samanids and Ghaznavids. The title was thereafter used for decades till the Safavid period, when it was replaced by the title of monshi (منشی). However, dabīr was in use once again under the Qajar dynasty.

During the Mughal Empire in the Indian subcontinent, the Persian word Dabir was used as an honorific title for writers, government secretaries, and administrators. The Indian poet Mirza Ghalib was given the honorific title Dabir-ul-Mulk. 16th century Indian teacher Rupa Goswami was among those who held the title Dabir Khas during his reign as the Sultan's chief secretary. In addition to its use as an honorific and surname, it is occasionally used as a given name. Notable people with the name include:

== People ==
=== Given name ===
- Dabir Uddin Ahmed (1927–1996), Bangladeshi politician
- Dabirul Islam (1948–2026), Bangladeshi politician
- Dabir Khan (1905–1972), Indian vocalist

=== Surname ===
- Alireza Dabir (born 1977), Iranian wrestler
- Mohammad Dabir Moghaddam (born 1953), Iranian linguist
- Pramod Dabir (born 1984), American tennis player
- Sangita Dabir (born 1971), Indian cricketer
- Soniya Dabir (born 1980), Indian cricketer

== Sources ==
- Rajabzadeh, Hashem (1993). "Dabīr". Encyclopaedia Iranica, Vol. VI, Fasc. 5. pp. 534–539.
