= 2003 US Open – Men's singles =

Men's singles
- 2003 US Open

Final
- Champion: (United States) Andy Roddick
- Runner-up: (Spain) Juan Carlos Ferrero
- Score: 6–3, 7–6^{(7–2)}, 6–3

Details
- Draw: 128
- Seeds: 32

Events
Singles	men	women		boys	girls
Doubles	men	women	mixed	boys	girls
WC Singles	men	women	quad
WC Doubles	men	women	quad
Legends	men	women	mixed
- US Open

Andy Roddick defeated Juan Carlos Ferrero in the final, 6–3, 7–6^{(7–2)}, 6–3 to win the men's singles tennis title at the 2003 US Open. It was his first and only major title. Roddick saved a match point en route to the title, in the semifinals against David Nalbandian. He also completed the Summer Slam, having won the Canada Masters and Cincinnati Masters. Roddick remains the most recent American to win a major men's singles title.

Pete Sampras was the reigning champion, but he retired from professional tennis in August 2003.

This tournament marked the first US Open main draw appearance of future four-time champion Rafael Nadal. It also marked the final major appearances of former major champions Michael Chang and Yevgeny Kafelnikov.

== Seeds ==
1. (United States) Andre Agassi (semifinals)
2. (Switzerland) Roger Federer (fourth round)
3. (Spain) Juan Carlos Ferrero (final)
4. (United States) Andy Roddick (champion)
5. (Argentina) Guillermo Coria (quarterfinals)
6. (Australia) Lleyton Hewitt (quarterfinals)
7. (Spain) Carlos Moyà (fourth round)
8. (Germany) Rainer Schüttler (fourth round)
9. (France) Sébastien Grosjean (first round)
10. (Czech Republic) Jiří Novák (third round)
11. (Thailand) Paradorn Srichaphan (fourth round)
12. (Netherlands) Sjeng Schalken (quarterfinals)
13. (Argentina) David Nalbandian (semifinals)
14. (Brazil) Gustavo Kuerten (first round)
15. (Chile) Fernando González (third round)
16. (Netherlands) Martin Verkerk (second round)
17. (Spain) Tommy Robredo (first round)
18. (Belarus) Max Mirnyi (first round)
19. (Argentina) Agustín Calleri (second round)
20. (Australia) Mark Philippoussis (third round)
21. (Spain) Félix Mantilla (first round)
22. (Morocco) Younes El Aynaoui (quarterfinals)
23. (South Africa) Wayne Ferreira (second round)
24. (United States) Mardy Fish (second round)
25. (Spain) Albert Costa (second round)
26. (Argentina) Mariano Zabaleta (first round)
27. (Russia) Yevgeny Kafelnikov (third round)
28. (Spain) Feliciano López (first round)
29. (Argentina) Gastón Gaudio (first round)
30. (France) Arnaud Clément (second round)
31. (United States) Vincent Spadea (first round)
32. (Argentina) Juan Ignacio Chela (third round)

== Draw ==
Key

- Q = Qualifier
- WC = Wild card
- LL = Lucky loser
- Alt = Alternate
- ITF = ITF entry
- PR = Protected ranking
- SR = Special ranking
- SE = Special exempt
- JE = Junior exempt
- JR = Junior Accelerator Programme entrant
- CO = College Accelerator Programme entrant
- NG = Next Gen Accelerator Program entrant
- w/o = Walkover
- r = Retired
- d = Defaulted

=== Finals ===
Quarterfinals
1	(United States) Andre Agassi	6	6	7
5	(Argentina) Guillermo Coria	4	3	5
3	(Spain) Juan Carlos Ferrero	4	6	7^{7}	6
6	(Australia) Lleyton Hewitt	6	3	6^{5}	1
12	(Netherlands) Sjeng Schalken	4	2	3
4	(United States) Andy Roddick	6	6	6
22	(Morocco) Younes El Aynaoui	6^{2}	2	6	5
13	(Argentina) David Nalbandian	7^{7}	6	3	7

Semifinals
1	(United States) Andre Agassi	4	3	6	4
3	(Spain) Juan Carlos Ferrero	6	6	3	6
4	(United States) Andy Roddick	6^{4}	3	7^{9}	6	6
13	(Argentina) David Nalbandian	7^{7}	6	6^{7}	1	3

Final
3	(Spain) Juan Carlos Ferrero	3	6^{2}	3
4	(United States) Andy Roddick	6	7^{7}	6

=== Top half ===
==== Section 1 ====
First round
1	(United States) A Agassi	6	6	6
(Spain) À Corretja	1	2	2
(Sweden) A Vinciguerra	7^{7}	6^{2}	7	1	6
WC	(United States) R Kendrick	6^{4}	7^{7}	5	6	1
(Denmark) K Carlsen	6	3	6	6
WC	(United States) J Morrison	2	6	3	4
(Belgium) K Vliegen	6	6^{1}	2	2
27	(Russia) Y Kafelnikov	3	7^{7}	6	6
18	(Belarus) M Mirnyi	6^{3}	6	2	6^{6}
(Russia) N Davydenko	7^{7}	2	6	7^{8}
(United States) T Dent	7^{7}	6	3	6
Q	(Sweden) R Söderling	6^{1}	3	6	4
Q	(Italy) G Galimberti	7	2	2	6^{4}
(Austria) S Koubek	5	6	6	7^{7}
WC	(United States) M Chang	3	5	7	4
15	(Chile) F González	6	7	5	6

Second round
1	(United States) A Agassi	7^{7}	6	6
(Sweden) A Vinciguerra	6^{1}	1	4
(Denmark) K Carlsen	6	2	3	3
27	(Russia) Y Kafelnikov	4	6	6	6
(Russia) N Davydenko	3	4	6^{7}
(United States) T Dent	6	6	7^{9}
(Austria) S Koubek	6^{1}	1	2
15	(Chile) F González	7^{7}	6	6

Third round
1	(United States) A Agassi	6	7^{7}	6
27	(Russia) Y Kafelnikov	3	6^{4}	4
(United States) T Dent	7^{11}	6^{3}	3	7^{7}	6
15	(Chile) F González	6^{9}	7^{7}	6	6^{4}	4

Fourth round
1	(United States) A Agassi	6^{5}	6	7	0
(United States) T Dent	7^{7}	4	5	0^{r}

==== Section 2 ====
First round
9	(France) S Grosjean	4	7^{7}	6	6^{7}	4
Q	(Paraguay) R Delgado	6	6^{3}	4	7^{9}	6
(Sweden) J Björkman	6	6	6
(Italy) F Volandri	1	4	0
(Slovakia) K Kučera	6	7	6
(Germany) A Popp	2	5	3
Q	(Sweden) J Johansson	3	2	4
24	(United States) M Fish	6	6	6
30	(France) A Clément	6^{6}	7^{8}	6	6
(United States) B Vahaly	7^{8}	6^{6}	3	4
(France) G Carraz	6	4	6	5	6
(United Kingdom) G Rusedski	4	6	2	7	4
PR	(Czech Republic) B Ulihrach	4	6	6	6
Q	(Germany) M Abel	6	4	3	1
(Argentina) M Puerta	4	3	1
5	(Argentina) G Coria	6	6	6

Second round
Q	(Paraguay) R Delgado	6	4	4	6	3
(Sweden) J Björkman	4	6	6	3	6
(Slovakia) K Kučera	6	7^{9}	6
24	(United States) M Fish	4	6^{7}	4
30	(France) A Clément	6	6	2	6^{3}	1
(France) G Carraz	3	1	6	7^{7}	6
PR	(Czech Republic) B Ulihrach	2	1	4
5	(Argentina) G Coria	6	6	6

Third round
(Sweden) J Björkman	6	4	6^{3}	6	6
(Slovakia) K Kučera	4	6	7^{7}	4	4
(France) G Carraz	5	1	5
5	(Argentina) G Coria	7	6	7

Fourth round
(Sweden) J Björkman	2	3	6	2
5	(Argentina) G Coria	6	6	4	6

==== Section 3 ====
First round
3	(Spain) JC Ferrero	6	4	6	6
Q	(Czech Republic) J Vacek	2	6	3	2
(Austria) J Melzer	6	6	5	6
WC	(United States) B Baker	3	3	7	3
LL	(Czech Republic) T Berdych	5	6	6	6
(Germany) T Behrend	7	3	2	3
Q	(Croatia) R Karanušić	4	6^{2}	3
32	(Argentina) JI Chela	6	7^{7}	6
23	(South Africa) W Ferreira	6	6	6
(Peru) I Miranda	4	3	1
(Spain) D Ferrer	2	3	3
(United States) R Ginepri	6	6	6
WC	(United States) R Yim	1	6^{7}	2
(United States) T Martin	6	7^{9}	6
WC	(United States) A Bogomolov Jr.	6^{4}	6	6	6^{9}	0^{r}
16	(Netherlands) M Verkerk	7^{7}	4	3	7^{11}	1

Second round
3	(Spain) JC Ferrero	1	7^{7}	6	6
(Austria) J Melzer	6	6^{2}	2	4
LL	(Czech Republic) T Berdych	6	1	4	3
32	(Argentina) JI Chela	2	6	6	6
23	(South Africa) W Ferreira	2	4	7^{7}	2
(United States) R Ginepri	6	6	6^{0}	6
(United States) T Martin	6	6	6^{5}	7^{11}
16	(Netherlands) M Verkerk	3	4	7^{7}	6^{9}

Third round
3	(Spain) JC Ferrero	7	7	6
32	(Argentina) JI Chela	5	5	1
(United States) R Ginepri	7^{7}	6^{4}	4	4
(United States) T Martin	6^{2}	7^{7}	6	6

Fourth round
3	(Spain) JC Ferrero	6	6	3	5	6
(United States) T Martin	2	4	6	7	3

==== Section 4 ====
First round
11	(Thailand) P Srichaphan	2	6	6	7^{7}
(France) C Saulnier	6	2	3	6^{4}
(United States) J Gimelstob	3	4	2
(Slovakia) D Hrbatý	6	6	6
(Spain) R Ramírez Hidalgo	6	0	6	1	1
(Italy) D Sanguinetti	4	6	3	6	6
LL	(Spain) F Verdasco	6	6	6
17	(Spain) T Robredo	3	4	2
28	(Spain) F López	4	4	4
(Czech Republic) R Štěpánek	6	6	6
Q	(France) J Benneteau	6	5	2	2
(France) F Santoro	0	7	6	6
(South Korea) H-t Lee	6	6	7^{7}
(Belarus) V Voltchkov	3	4	6^{3}
(Romania) V Hănescu	3	2	2
6	(Australia) L Hewitt	6	6	6

Second round
11	(Thailand) P Srichaphan	6	6	6
(Slovakia) D Hrbatý	4	4	3
(Italy) D Sanguinetti	6^{6}	6^{5}	6	3
LL	(Spain) F Verdasco	7^{8}	7^{7}	4	6
(Czech Republic) R Štěpánek	6	6	6^{6}	6
(France) F Santoro	2	4	7^{8}	3
(South Korea) H-t Lee	7	2	2	4
6	(Australia) L Hewitt	5	6	6	6

Third round
11	(Thailand) P Srichaphan	6	6	6
LL	(Spain) F Verdasco	3	4	3
(Czech Republic) R Štěpánek	1	0^{r}
6	(Australia) L Hewitt	6	3

Fourth round
11	(Thailand) P Srichaphan	6	2	4	2
6	(Australia) L Hewitt	4	6	6	6

=== Bottom half ===
==== Section 5 ====
First round
8	(Germany) R Schüttler	4	6	6	6
(Australia) W Arthurs	6	3	2	4
(Germany) N Kiefer	6	5
(Argentina) F Squillari	3	0^{r}
(France) O Mutis	0	3	1
(Spain) A Martín	6	6	6
(Netherlands) R Sluiter	6^{5}	6^{3}	6	3
25	(Spain) A Costa	7^{7}	7^{7}	2	6
21	(Spain) F Mantilla	4	4	4
Q	(Croatia) I Karlović	6	6	6
Q	(United States) J Salzenstein	1	6^{4}	3
(Morocco) H Arazi	6	7^{7}	6
(Peru) L Horna	4	6	6	5	1
(Germany) L Burgsmüller	6	4	3	7	6
(France) J Boutter	2	3	2
12	(Netherlands) S Schalken	6	6	6

Second round
8	(Germany) R Schüttler	6	7	2	6
(Germany) N Kiefer	1	5	6	4
(Spain) A Martín	6	6	3	6
25	(Spain) A Costa	3	3	6	2
Q	(Croatia) I Karlović	3	7^{7}	7^{7}	7^{8}
(Morocco) H Arazi	6	6^{5}	6^{4}	6^{6}
(Germany) L Burgsmüller	6	6	2	2	0
12	(Netherlands) S Schalken	4	2	6	6	6

Third round
8	(Germany) R Schüttler	6	6	6
(Spain) A Martín	1	4	2
Q	(Croatia) I Karlović	6^{8}	6^{5}	6^{3}
12	(Netherlands) S Schalken	7^{10}	7^{7}	7^{7}

Fourth round
8	(Germany) R Schüttler	1	6	3	4
12	(Netherlands) S Schalken	6	4	6	6

==== Section 6 ====
First round
14	(Brazil) G Kuerten	7	2	2	6	6^{1}
Q	(Russia) D Tursunov	5	6	6	4	7^{7}
(Belgium) C Rochus	0	2	2
(Netherlands) J van Lottum	6	6	6
(Belgium) X Malisse	6	6	6
(Belgium) O Rochus	3	4	2
(Austria) W Eschauer	6^{4}	6^{2}	6	4
19	(Argentina) A Calleri	7^{7}	7^{7}	1	6
31	(United States) V Spadea	3	1	7	6^{8}
(Brazil) F Saretta	6	6	5	7^{10}
(Slovakia) K Beck	6	3	5	6	4
(Ecuador) N Lapentti	4	6	7	3	6
(Croatia) I Ljubičić	6	6	7
(France) P-H Mathieu	4	2	5
(United Kingdom) T Henman	3	6^{2}	3
4	(United States) A Roddick	6	7^{7}	6

Second round
Q	(Russia) D Tursunov	6	3	6	5	6
(Netherlands) J van Lottum	4	6	3	7	2
(Belgium) X Malisse	6	6^{3}	6	3	6
19	(Argentina) A Calleri	2	7^{7}	3	6	3
(Brazil) F Saretta	6	6	6
(Ecuador) N Lapentti	2	4	0
(Croatia) I Ljubičić	3	7^{7}	3	6^{8}
4	(United States) A Roddick	6	6^{4}	6	7^{10}

Third round
Q	(Russia) D Tursunov	5	4	6^{8}
(Belgium) X Malisse	7	6	7^{10}
(Brazil) F Saretta	1	3	3
4	(United States) A Roddick	6	6	6

Fourth round
(Belgium) X Malisse	3	4	6^{5}
4	(United States) A Roddick	6	6	7^{7}

==== Section 7 ====
First round
7	(Spain) C Moyà	4	6	7	7^{8}
(Australia) S Draper	6	4	5	6^{6}
Q	(South Africa) W Moodie	7^{7}	6	6
(Spain) Á Montañés	6^{3}	2	2
Q	(Sweden) T Enqvist	6	6	6
(Spain) A Portas	2	3	1
(Chile) N Massú	6	6	6
29	(Argentina) G Gaudio	3	3	2
22	(Morocco) Y El Aynaoui	7	7^{7}	6
WC	(United States) A Kim	5	6^{5}	3
(Spain) R Nadal	6	6	6
(Spain) F Vicente	4	3	3
(Spain) D Sánchez	6^{3}	2	2
(United States) J-M Gambill	7^{7}	6	6
(Croatia) M Ančić	6	3	7	2	2
10	(Czech Republic) J Novák	3	6	5	6	6

Second round
7	(Spain) C Moyà	6	7^{8}	6
Q	(South Africa) W Moodie	2	6^{6}	3
Q	(Sweden) T Enqvist	3	2	5
(Chile) N Massú	6	6	7
22	(Morocco) Y El Aynaoui	7^{8}	6	7^{8}
(Spain) R Nadal	6^{6}	3	6^{6}
(United States) J-M Gambill	4	4	4
10	(Czech Republic) J Novák	6	6	6

Third round
7	(Spain) C Moyà	7	6	3	6
(Chile) N Massú	5	4	6	3
22	(Morocco) Y El Aynaoui	7^{7}	5	3	6	7^{7}
10	(Czech Republic) J Novák	6^{1}	7	6	3	6^{5}

Fourth round
7	(Spain) C Moyà	6^{4}	6^{7}	6	4
22	(Morocco) Y El Aynaoui	7^{7}	7^{9}	4	6

==== Section 8 ====
First round
13	(Argentina) D Nalbandian	6	7^{7}	6
Q	(Germany) P Kohlschreiber	4	6^{4}	3
(Finland) J Nieminen	6	6	7
Q	(France) N Mahut	2	4	5
(Russia) M Youzhny	7	4	6	3	5
(France) A Dupuis	5	6	3	6	7
Q	(Serbia and Montenegro) J Tipsarević	2	6^{4}	4
20	(Australia) M Philippoussis	6	7^{7}	6
26	(Argentina) M Zabaleta	6^{4}	3	2
(United States) J Blake	7^{7}	6	6
WC	(United States) A Delic	6	3	7^{7}	2	5
(Armenia) S Sargsian	4	6	6^{3}	6	7
(France) J-R Lisnard	6	6	6^{4}	0	7^{7}
(Sweden) M Norman	2	2	7^{7}	6	6^{4}
(Argentina) J Acasuso	7	3	3	0^{r}
2	(Switzerland) R Federer	5	6	6	2

Second round
13	(Argentina) D Nalbandian	5	6	6	4	7^{7}
(Finland) J Nieminen	7	3	1	6	6^{3}
(France) A Dupuis	2	3	4
20	(Australia) M Philippoussis	6	6	6
(United States) J Blake	6	6	4	7^{8}
(Armenia) S Sargsian	3	4	6	6^{6}
(France) J-R Lisnard	1	2	0
2	(Switzerland) R Federer	6	6	6

Third round
13	(Argentina) D Nalbandian	7	6^{10}	6	6
20	(Australia) M Philippoussis	5	7^{12}	3	2
(United States) J Blake	3	6^{4}	3
2	(Switzerland) R Federer	6	7^{7}	6

Fourth round
13	(Argentina) D Nalbandian	3	7^{7}	6	6
2	(Switzerland) R Federer	6	6^{1}	4	3

Preceded by 2003 Wimbledon Championships – Men's singles	Grand Slam men's singles	Succeeded by 2004 Australian Open – Men's singles
