= 2003 US Open – Women's singles =

Women's singles
- 2003 US Open

Final
- Champion: (Belgium) Justine Henin-Hardenne
- Runner-up: (Belgium) Kim Clijsters
- Score: 7–5, 6–1

Details
- Draw: 128
- Seeds: 32

Events
Singles	men	women		boys	girls
Doubles	men	women	mixed	boys	girls
WC Singles	men	women	quad
WC Doubles	men	women	quad
Legends	men	women	mixed
← 2002 ·	US Open	· 2004 →

Justine Henin-Hardenne defeated Kim Clijsters in the final, 7–5, 6–1 to win the women's singles tennis title at the 2003 US Open. It was her first US Open title and second major title overall.

Serena Williams was the reigning champion, but did not participate due to injury. Defending finalist Venus Williams also withdrew before the tournament due to injury, marking the first time in the Open Era that neither of the reigning US Open finalists returned. This was also the only major between the 1997 Australian Open and the 2011 French Open (a span of 56 events) where neither of the Williams sisters competed.

This marked the first US Open main draw appearance of future champion Flavia Pennetta, as well as the first US Open appearance of future world No. 1 and five-time major champion Maria Sharapova, who would win the title three years later; they lost to Svetlana Kuznetsova and Émilie Loit in the first and second rounds, respectively.

== Seeds ==
1. (Belgium) Kim Clijsters (final)
2. (Belgium) Justine Henin-Hardenne (champion)
3. (United States) Lindsay Davenport (semifinals)
4. (United States) Venus Williams (withdrew)
5. (France) Amélie Mauresmo (quarterfinals)
6. (United States) Jennifer Capriati (semifinals)
7. (Russia) Anastasia Myskina (quarterfinals)
8. (United States) Chanda Rubin (first round)
9. (Slovakia) Daniela Hantuchová (third round)
10. (Bulgaria) Magdalena Maleeva (first round)
11. (Russia) Elena Dementieva (fourth round)
12. (Spain) Conchita Martínez (second round)
13. (Russia) Vera Zvonareva (third round)
14. (South Africa) Amanda Coetzer (third round)
15. (Japan) Ai Sugiyama (fourth round)
16. (Russia) Elena Bovina (first round)
17. (United States) Meghann Shaughnessy (fourth round)
18. (Switzerland) Patty Schnyder (second round)
19. (Russia) Nadia Petrova (third round)
20. (Italy) Silvia Farina Elia (second round)
21. (Israel) Anna Pistolesi (first round)
22. (Serbia and Montenegro) Jelena Dokić (second round)
23. (France) Nathalie Dechy (second round)
24. (Argentina) Paola Suárez (quarterfinals)
25. (Greece) Eleni Daniilidou (first round)
26. (Russia) Lina Krasnoroutskaya (first round)
27. (Russia) Svetlana Kuznetsova (third round)
28. (United States) Lisa Raymond (second round)
29. (Italy) Francesca Schiavone (quarterfinals)
30. (Spain) Magüi Serna (second round)
31. (United States) Alexandra Stevenson (first round)
32. (Switzerland) Marie-Gayanay Mikaelian (second round)
33. (Slovenia) Katarina Srebotnik (second round)

== Draw ==
=== Key ===
- Q = Qualifier
- WC = Wild card
- LL = Lucky loser
- Alt = Alternate
- ITF = ITF entry
- PR = Protected ranking
- SR = Special ranking
- SE = Special exempt
- JE = Junior exempt
- JR = Junior Accelerator Programme entrant
- CO = College Accelerator Programme entrant
- NG = Next Gen Accelerator Program entrant
- w/o = Walkover
- r = Retired
- d = Defaulted

=== Finals ===
Quarterfinals
1	(Belgium) Kim Clijsters	6	6
5	(France) Amélie Mauresmo	1	4
3	(United States) Lindsay Davenport	6	6
24	(Argentina) Paola Suárez	4	0
6	(United States) Jennifer Capriati	6	6
29	(Italy) Francesca Schiavone	1	3
7	(Russia) Anastasia Myskina	2	3
2	(Belgium) Justine Henin-Hardenne	6	6

Semifinals
1	(Belgium) Kim Clijsters	6	6
3	(United States) Lindsay Davenport	2	3
6	(United States) Jennifer Capriati	6	5	6^{4}
2	(Belgium) Justine Henin-Hardenne	4	7	7^{7}

Final
1	(Belgium) Kim Clijsters	5	1
2	(Belgium) Justine Henin-Hardenne	7	6

=== Top half ===
==== Section 1 ====
First round
1	(Belgium) K Clijsters	6	6
WC	(United States) A Liu	2	3
(United States) L Granville	6	6
(United States) A Cargill	4	0
(Hungary) P Mandula	7	6
(Zimbabwe) C Black	5	2
(Italy) F Pennetta	1	1
27	(Russia) S Kuznetsova	6	6
17	(United States) M Shaughnessy	6	6
(Croatia) K Šprem	3	2
WC	(United States) C Morariu	3	5
(Slovenia) M Matevžič	6	7
Q	(Russia) V Douchevina	4	2
(United States) A Harkleroad	6	6
(Slovakia) Ľ Kurhajcová	3	2
13	(Russia) V Zvonareva	6	6

Second round
1	(Belgium) K Clijsters	6	6
(United States) L Granville	1	1
(Hungary) P Mandula	3	3
27	(Russia) S Kuznetsova	6	6
17	(United States) M Shaughnessy	6	7
(Slovenia) M Matevžič	3	5
(United States) A Harkleroad	3	6	1
13	(Russia) V Zvonareva	6	4	6

Third round
1	(Belgium) K Clijsters	6	6
27	(Russia) S Kuznetsova	3	2
17	(United States) M Shaughnessy	4	6	6
13	(Russia) V Zvonareva	6	4	2

Fourth round
1	(Belgium) K Clijsters	6	6
17	(United States) M Shaughnessy	2	4

==== Section 2 ====
First round
9	(Slovakia) D Hantuchová	6	6
(France) M Bartoli	3	2
(Ukraine) J Vakulenko	7	6
(Germany) B Rittner	5	2
(Thailand) T Tanasugarn	6	7
(Italy) R Grande	0	5
WC	(United States) B Bielik	1	4
18	(Switzerland) P Schnyder	6	6
26	(Russia) L Krasnoroutskaya	1	6	3
(Germany) A Barna	6	0	6
WC	(United States) T Logar	4	2
Q	(Russia) M Kirilenko	6	6
(France) S Cohen-Aloro	6	6
Q	(Russia) A Jidkova	2	4
(Indonesia) A Widjaja	0	2
5	(France) A Mauresmo	6	6

Second round
9	(Slovakia) D Hantuchová	6	6
(Ukraine) J Vakulenko	3	2
(Thailand) T Tanasugarn	6	6
18	(Switzerland) P Schnyder	4	3
(Germany) A Barna	6	6^{4}	5
Q	(Russia) M Kirilenko	3	7^{7}	7
(France) S Cohen-Aloro	2	2
5	(France) A Mauresmo	6	6

Third round
9	(Slovakia) D Hantuchová	2	4
(Thailand) T Tanasugarn	6	6
Q	(Russia) M Kirilenko	4	2
5	(France) A Mauresmo	6	6

Fourth round
(Thailand) T Tanasugarn	2	2
5	(France) A Mauresmo	6	6

==== Section 3 ====
First round
3	(United States) L Davenport	6	6
(Belgium) E Callens	1	0
(Czech Republic) D Bedáňová	4	0
(Italy) ME Camerin	6	6
(Argentina) C Fernández	6	1	5
(Hungary) M Czink	3	6	7
Q	(Belarus) T Poutchek	3	6^{1}
28	(United States) L Raymond	6	7^{7}
19	(Russia) N Petrova	6	6
Q	(Colombia) C Castaño	4	0
(Czech Republic) D Chládková	6	1	6
LL	(Italy) Ad Serra Zanetti	4	6	1
(Austria) B Schett	7^{7}	7
(Slovakia) J Husárová	6^{3}	5
Q	(United States) G Lastra	0	2
14	(South Africa) A Coetzer	6	6

Second round
3	(United States) L Davenport	6	6
(Italy) ME Camerin	2	4
(Hungary) M Czink	4	6	6
28	(United States) L Raymond	6	4	1
19	(Russia) N Petrova	6	6
(Czech Republic) D Chládková	1	2
(Austria) B Schett	6	5	2
14	(South Africa) A Coetzer	3	7	6

Third round
3	(United States) L Davenport	6	6
(Hungary) M Czink	0	2
19	(Russia) N Petrova	6	6
14	(South Africa) A Coetzer	0	1

Fourth round
3	(United States) L Davenport	6	6^{6}	6
19	(Russia) N Petrova	0	7^{8}	2

==== Section 4 ====
First round
12	(Spain) C Martínez	6	6
(United States) S Taylor	3	4
(Australia) A Molik	7^{7}	6
Q	(Croatia) J Kostanić	6^{4}	3
(Czech Republic) Z Ondrášková	2	1
Q	(Venezuela) M Sequera	6	6
(Germany) A Rösch	3	3
24	(Argentina) P Suárez	6	6
25	(Greece) E Daniilidou	3	1
(Switzerland) M Casanova	6	6
(Colombia) F Zuluaga	6	6
(Japan) A Morigami	1	4
(Russia) E Likhovtseva	6	6
(Croatia) I Majoli	1	1
(Venezuela) M Vento-Kabchi	6	6
8	(United States) C Rubin	4	4

Second round
12	(Spain) C Martínez	5	4
(Australia) A Molik	7	6
Q	(Venezuela) M Sequera	1	0
24	(Argentina) P Suárez	6	6
(Switzerland) M Casanova	5	3
(Colombia) F Zuluaga	7	6
(Russia) E Likhovtseva	7	6
(Venezuela) M Vento-Kabchi	5	3

Third round
(Australia) A Molik	4	6	2
24	(Argentina) P Suárez	6	4	6
(Colombia) F Zuluaga	6^{4}	4
(Russia) E Likhovtseva	7^{7}	6

Fourth round
24	(Argentina) P Suárez	6	3	7
(Russia) E Likhovtseva	2	6	5

=== Bottom half ===
==== Section 5 ====
First round
6	(United States) J Capriati	6	6
(Spain) C Torrens Valero	0	1
(United States) M Irvin	2	6^{5}
(Slovakia) M Suchá	6	7^{7}
(Russia) M Sharapova	6	6
(Spain) V Ruano-Pascual	1	1
(France) É Loit	6	5	6
31	(United States) A Stevenson	2	7	4
23	(France) N Dechy	3	6	6
WC	(United States) B Mattek	6	4	4
WC	(United States) S Perry	3	1
(United States) A Frazier	6	6
(Ukraine) T Perebiynis	6	6
(Spain) M Marrero	1	4
Q	(Czech Republic) A Vašková	2	3
11	(Russia) E Dementieva	6	6

Second round
6	(United States) J Capriati	6	6
(Slovakia) M Suchá	1	1
(Russia) M Sharapova	3	4
(France) É Loit	6	6
23	(France) N Dechy
(United States) A Frazier	w/o
(Ukraine) T Perebiynis	7	4	0
11	(Russia) E Dementieva	5	6	6

Third round
6	(United States) J Capriati	6	2	6
(France) É Loit	2	6	2
(United States) A Frazier	6^{1}	6^{3}
11	(Russia) E Dementieva	7^{7}	7^{7}

Fourth round
6	(United States) J Capriati	6	7
11	(Russia) E Dementieva	2	5

==== Section 6 ====
First Round
15	(Japan) A Sugiyama	6	6
(Spain) C Martínez Granados	1	0
(Spain) G León García	1	0
(France) V Razzano	6	6
(United States) J Craybas	5	0
(Australia) N Pratt	7	6
Q	(Argentina) ME Salerni	4	1
20	(Italy) S Farina Elia	6	6
29	(Italy) F Schiavone	6	6
(Slovakia) E Fislová	4	4
(Spain) A Parra Santonja	6	1	6
(Czech Republic) K Koukalová	2	6	2
(Slovenia) T Pisnik	6	6
WC	(United States) A Haynes	4	2
Q	(Canada) M Drake	6	6^{2}	1
33	(Slovenia) K Srebotnik	0	7^{7}	6

Second round
15	(Japan) A Sugiyama	1	6	6
(France) V Razzano	6	3	3
(Australia) N Pratt	7^{7}	4	6
20	(Italy) S Farina Elia	6^{5}	6	1
29	(Italy) F Schiavone	6	6
(Spain) A Parra Santonja	4	3
(Slovenia) T Pisnik	7	6
33	(Slovenia) K Srebotnik	5	0

Third round
15	(Japan) A Sugiyama	3	6	6
(Australia) N Pratt	6	4	3
29	(Italy) F Schiavone	7	7^{11}
(Slovenia) T Pisnik	5	6^{9}

Fourth round
15	(Japan) A Sugiyama	7^{7}	5	2
29	(Italy) F Schiavone	6^{5}	7	6

==== Section 7 ====
First round
7	(Russia) A Myskina	6	3	6
(Slovakia) H Nagyová	2	6	1
(France) S Foretz	6	5	4
(Italy) An Serra Zanetti	3	7	6
Q	(Ukraine) Y Beygelzimer	6^{10}	5
(Spain) M Sánchez Lorenzo	7^{12}	7
(South Korea) Y-j Cho	6	2	1
30	(Spain) M Serna	3	6	6
22	(Serbia and Montenegro) J Dokić	6	6
(Switzerland) E Gagliardi	4	2
(France) M Pierce	6	6
Q	(Germany) S Gehrlein	3	2
(Italy) T Garbin	4	7^{8}	6
Q	(Italy) M Santangelo	6	6^{6}	4
(Japan) S Asagoe	6	6
10	(Bulgaria) M Maleeva	4	3

Second round
7	(Russia) A Myskina	6	2	7^{7}
(Italy) An Serra Zanetti	2	6	6^{3}
(Spain) M Sánchez Lorenzo	7	6
30	(Spain) M Serna	5	1
22	(Serbia and Montenegro) J Dokić	2	7^{7}	6^{5}
(France) M Pierce	6	6^{5}	7^{7}
(Italy) T Garbin	2	6	2
(Japan) S Asagoe	6	3	6

Third round
7	(Russia) A Myskina	2	6	6
(Spain) M Sánchez Lorenzo	6	4	3
(France) M Pierce	6	6
(Japan) S Asagoe	4	1

Fourth round
7	(Russia) A Myskina	7^{7}	6
(France) M Pierce	6^{2}	1

==== Section 8 ====
First round
16	(Russia) E Bovina	6	6^{3}	4
(Slovakia) Ľ Cervanová	4	7^{7}	6
(Russia) D Safina	7	6
WC	(United States) C Gullickson	5	2
(United States) S Reeves	6	6
(Czech Republic) I Benešová	1	1
(Luxembourg) C Schaul	7^{7}	6
21	(Israel) A Pistolesi	6^{5}	2
32	(Switzerland) M-G Mikaelian	6	6
(Germany) M Weingärtner	3	1
Q	(China) T Sun	2	5
(Japan) S Obata	6	7
(Madagascar) D Randriantefy	3	0
(Croatia) S Talaja	6	6
Q	(Hungary) A Kapros	5	3
2	(Belgium) J Henin-Hardenne	7	6

Second round
(Slovakia) Ľ Cervanová	4	1
(Russia) D Safina	6	6
(United States) S Reeves	1	6	3
(Luxembourg) C Schaul	6	4	6
32	(Switzerland) M-G Mikaelian	5	4
(Japan) S Obata	7	6
(Croatia) S Talaja	1	2
2	(Belgium) J Henin-Hardenne	6	6

Third round
(Russia) D Safina	6	7
(Luxembourg) C Schaul	4	5
(Japan) S Obata	1	2
2	(Belgium) J Henin-Hardenne	6	6

Fourth round
(Russia) D Safina	0	3
2	(Belgium) J Henin-Hardenne	6	6

Preceded by 2003 Wimbledon Championships – Women's singles	Grand Slam women's singles	Succeeded by 2004 Australian Open – Women's singles
