= Pramod Dabir =

American entrepreneur and investor

- Country (sports): United States
- Born: October 5, 1984 (age 41) Fairfax, Virginia
- Height: 6 ft 2 in (188 cm)

Singles
- Highest ranking: No. 1326 (December 9, 2002)

Doubles
- Career record: 0–1
- Highest ranking: No. 1243 (February 20, 2006)

Grand Slam doubles results
- US Open: 1R (2003)

Pramod Dabir (born October 5, 1984) is an American entrepreneur, investor, and former competitive tennis player. He is the founder of Open Doors Partners, an investment platform focused on private-market opportunities in technology and artificial intelligence. He is also the founder of West Agile Labs, a digital product engineering firm that was acquired in 2023 in a transaction involving BayLink Capital and Trive Capital.

Following the transaction, West Agile Labs and Wavelabs Technologies were combined to form Veltris, backed by Trive Capital and BayLink Capital, and Dabir assumed the role of President.

== Early life and education ==
Dabir grew up in Monta Vista and was ranked as high as fourth nationally in the United States for the 16s age group, holding the top ranking in Northern California for the 18s division.

The son of engineers, he attended the University of Illinois Urbana–Champaign, where he earned a degree in Electrical Engineering and competed in collegiate tennis.

== Tennis career ==
Dabir played collegiate tennis for the University of Illinois. The Illinois men's tennis team won the 2003 NCAA Division I National Championship and recorded a 64-match winning streak during his tenure, which has been cited as the longest in NCAA men’s tennis history.

In 2003, Dabir partnered with John Isner to win the national doubles title at the USTA Boys’ 18s Championships in Kalamazoo. The pair later competed as wildcards in the men's doubles main draw of the 2003 US Open.

== Career ==
=== Finance ===
After college, Dabir worked in investment banking at Goldman Sachs and later at TA Associates, where he focused on internet and software investing.

=== West Agile Labs and Veltris ===
Dabir founded West Agile Labs and served as its Chief Executive Officer. In 2023, the company was acquired in a transaction involving BayLink Capital and Trive Capital.

In October 2023, Trive Capital and BayLink Capital announced the formation of Veltris through the combination of West Agile Labs and Wavelabs Technologies, with Dabir assuming the role of President.

=== Cents ===
Dabir is a co-founder of Cents, a laundry business management platform serving laundromats and dry cleaners. In 2022, the company raised a $40 million Series B and reported more than $77 million in total funding, with investors including Tiger Global and Bessemer Venture Partners.

=== Open Doors Partners ===
In 2017, Dabir founded Open Doors Partners, an investment platform that structures special purpose vehicles (SPVs) to invest in private companies. The platform has utilized third-party infrastructure providers to support SPV administration and investor onboarding.
