= 2003 US Open – Women's doubles =

Women's doubles
- 2003 US Open

Final
- Champions: (Spain) Virginia Ruano Pascual (Argentina) Paola Suárez
- Runners-up: (Russia) Svetlana Kuznetsova (United States) Martina Navratilova
- Score: 6–2, 6–3

Details
- Draw: 64 (7 WC )
- Seeds: 16

Events
Singles	men	women		boys	girls
Doubles	men	women	mixed	boys	girls
WC Singles	men	women	quad
WC Doubles	men	women	quad
Legends	men	women	mixed
← 2002 ·	US Open	· 2004 →

Defending champions Virginia Ruano Pascual and Paola Suárez defeated Svetlana Kuznetsova and Martina Navratilova in the final, 6–2, 6–3 to win the women's doubles tennis title at the 2003 US Open. It was both players' fourth career major doubles title and second title at the US Open.

This was Navratilova’s 12th US Open women’s doubles final, having won the title a record 9 times. She would win her first US Open women’s doubles title back at the 1977 edition of the US Open, 8 years before her partner was born (Kuznetsova b. 27 June 1985).

== Seeds ==
1. (Belgium) Kim Clijsters / (Japan) Ai Sugiyama (second round, withdrew)
2. (Spain) Virginia Ruano Pascual / (Argentina) Paola Suárez (champions)
3. (Zimbabwe) Cara Black / (Russia) Elena Likhovtseva (semifinals)
4. (Russia) Svetlana Kuznetsova / (United States) Martina Navratilova (final)
5. (Russia) Elena Bovina / (Australia) Rennae Stubbs (quarterfinals)
6. (Russia) Elena Dementieva / (Russia) Lina Krasnoroutskaya (third round)
7. (Slovakia) Janette Husárová / (Spain) Conchita Martínez (quarterfinals)
8. (South Africa) Liezel Huber / (Bulgaria) Magdalena Maleeva (quarterfinals)
9. (Hungary) Petra Mandula / (Austria) Patricia Wartusch (third round)
10. (Russia) Nadia Petrova / (France) Mary Pierce (third round)
11. (Switzerland) Emmanuelle Gagliardi / (United States) Meghann Shaughnessy (first round)
12. (Slovakia) Daniela Hantuchová / (United States) Chanda Rubin (third round)
13. (Venezuela) María Vento-Kabchi / (Indonesia) Angelique Widjaja (quarterfinals)
14. (Japan) Shinobu Asagoe / (Japan) Nana Miyagi (second round)
15. (Slovenia) Tina Križan / (Slovenia) Katarina Srebotnik (third round)
16. (Chinese Taipei) Janet Lee / (Indonesia) Wynne Prakusya (first round)

== Draw ==
=== Key ===
- Q = Qualifier
- WC = Wild card
- LL = Lucky loser
- Alt = Alternate
- ITF = ITF entry
- PR = Protected ranking
- SR = Special ranking
- SE = Special exempt
- JE = Junior exempt
- JR = Junior Accelerator Programme entrant
- CO = College Accelerator Programme entrant
- NG = Next Gen Accelerator Program entrant
- w/o = Walkover
- r = Retired
- d = Defaulted

=== Finals ===
Quarterfinals
13	(Venezuela) María Vento-Kabchi (Indonesia) Angelique Widjaja	2	2
(France) Marion Bartoli (Switzerland) Myriam Casanova	6	6
4	(Russia) Svetlana Kuznetsova (United States) Martina Navratilova	6	6
8	(South Africa) Liezel Huber (Bulgaria) Magdalena Maleeva	3	3
7	(Slovakia) Janette Husárová (Spain) Conchita Martínez	6^{4}	3
3	(Zimbabwe) Cara Black (Russia) Elena Likhovtseva	7^{7}	6
5	(Russia) Elena Bovina (Australia) Rennae Stubbs	3	6^{4}
2	(Spain) Virginia Ruano Pascual (Argentina) Paola Suárez	6	7^{7}

Semifinals
(France) Marion Bartoli (Switzerland) Myriam Casanova	4	6^{0}
4	(Russia) Svetlana Kuznetsova (United States) Martina Navratilova	6	7^{7}
3	(Zimbabwe) Cara Black (Russia) Elena Likhovtseva	2	6^{7}
2	(Spain) Virginia Ruano Pascual (Argentina) Paola Suárez	6	7^{9}

Final
4	(Russia) Svetlana Kuznetsova (United States) Martina Navratilova	2	3
2	(Spain) Virginia Ruano Pascual (Argentina) Paola Suárez	6	6

=== Top half ===
==== Section 1 ====
First round
1	(Belgium) K Clijsters (Japan) A Sugiyama	6	6
(Federal Republic of Yugoslavia) J Dokic (United States) C Morariu	2	2
(Australia) L McShea (Australia) T Musgrave	7^{7}	6^{4}	6
(Estonia) M Ani (France) C Dhenin	6^{4}	7^{7}	4
(France) S Cohen-Aloro (Ukraine) T Perebiynis	7^{7}	6
(Canada) S Jeyaseelan (Croatia) J Kostanić	6^{5}	4
WC	(United States) A Baker (United States) A Haynes	3	2
13	(Venezuela) M Vento-Kabchi (Indonesia) A Widjaja	6	6
11	(Switzerland) E Gagliardi (United States) M Shaughnessy	4	7	4
(France) M Bartoli (Switzerland) M Casanova	6	5	6
(Italy) F Pennetta (United States) M Washington	4	5
(Ukraine) Y Beygelzimer (Belarus) T Poutchek	6	7
(United States) T Ashley (United States) A Spears	4	6	6
(Germany) B Lamade (Russia) A Myskina	6	1	3
(Australia) A Molik (Spain) M Serna	5	1
6	(Russia) E Dementieva (Russia) L Krasnoroutskaya	7	6

Second round
1	(Belgium) K Clijsters (Japan) A Sugiyama
(Australia) L McShea (Australia) T Musgrave	w/o
(France) S Cohen-Aloro (Ukraine) T Perebiynis	3	4
13	(Venezuela) M Vento-Kabchi (Indonesia) A Widjaja	6	6
(France) M Bartoli (Switzerland) M Casanova	6	7^{7}
(Ukraine) Y Beygelzimer (Belarus) T Poutchek	3	6^{5}
(United States) T Ashley (United States) A Spears	4	0
6	(Russia) E Dementieva (Russia) L Krasnoroutskaya	6	6

Third round
(Australia) L McShea (Australia) T Musgrave	7	5	6^{1}
13	(Venezuela) M Vento-Kabchi (Indonesia) A Widjaja	5	7	7^{7}
(France) M Bartoli (Switzerland) M Casanova	4	6	6
6	(Russia) E Dementieva (Russia) L Krasnoroutskaya	6	1	3

Quarterfinals
13	(Venezuela) M Vento-Kabchi (Indonesia) A Widjaja	2	2
(France) M Bartoli (Switzerland) M Casanova	6	6

==== Section 2 ====
First round
4	(Russia) S Kuznetsova (United States) M Navratilova	7	6
(United States) J Craybas (Spain) C Martínez Granados	5	2
WC	(United States) L Raymond (Russia) M Sharapova	7^{7}	7^{7}
(Russia) A Jidkova (Japan) A Morigami	6^{5}	6^{2}
(Italy) S Farina Elia (Italy) T Garbin	3	7	3
(Slovenia) M Matevžič (Slovakia) H Nagyová	6	5	6
(Netherlands) K Boogert (Australia) E Dominikovic	4	4
14	(Japan) S Asagoe (Japan) N Miyagi	6	6
9	(Hungary) P Mandula (Austria) P Wartusch	6	5	6
WC	(United States) C Fusano (United States) R Kops-Jones	3	7	1
(South Korea) Y-j Cho (Australia) S Stosur	6	6
(Russia) E Kulikovskaya (Croatia) S Talaja	2	3
(Australia) N Pratt (Germany) B Rittner	1	6	0
(Austria) B Schett (Switzerland) P Schnyder	6	3	6
WC	(United States) A Yelsey (United States) R Zalameda	4	2
8	(South Africa) L Huber (Bulgaria) M Maleeva	6	6

Second round
4	(Russia) S Kuznetsova (United States) M Navratilova	6	6
WC	(United States) L Raymond (Russia) M Sharapova	2	2
(Slovenia) M Matevžič (Slovakia) H Nagyová	7	6
14	(Japan) S Asagoe (Japan) N Miyagi	5	4
9	(Hungary) P Mandula (Austria) P Wartusch	6	6
(South Korea) Y-j Cho (Australia) S Stosur	4	0
(Austria) B Schett (Switzerland) P Schnyder	7	2	2
8	(South Africa) L Huber (Bulgaria) M Maleeva	5	6	6

Third round
4	(Russia) S Kuznetsova (United States) M Navratilova	6	6
(Slovenia) M Matevžič (Slovakia) H Nagyová	2	3
9	(Hungary) P Mandula (Austria) P Wartusch	4	1
8	(South Africa) L Huber (Bulgaria) M Maleeva	6	6

Quarterfinals
4	(Russia) S Kuznetsova (United States) M Navratilova	6	6
8	(South Africa) L Huber (Bulgaria) M Maleeva	3	3

=== Bottom half ===
==== Section 3 ====
First round
7	(Slovakia) J Husárová (Spain) C Martínez	6	7^{7}
WC	(United States) B Bielik (United States) J Lehnhoff	4	6^{3}
(United States) S Reeves (Venezuela) M Sequera	4	3
(South Africa) K Grant (Australia) B Stewart	6	6
WC	(United States) B Mattek (United States) S Perry	6	6
(South Africa) N de Villiers (Czech Republic) G Navrátilová	0	0
(Germany) K Freye (South Africa) J Kruger	2	4
12	(Slovakia) D Hantuchová (United States) C Rubin	6	6
15	(Slovenia) T Križan (Slovenia) K Srebotnik	6	6
(South Africa) N Grandin (Hungary) K Marosi	1	2
(Argentina) G Dulko (United States) A Harkleroad	6^{5}	2
WC	(United States) C Gullickson (United States) S Taylor	7^{7}	6
(France) É Loit (Italy) F Schiavone	6^{5}	6	6
(Greece) E Daniilidou (Italy) R Grande	7^{7}	4	4
(Romania) A Vanc (Czech Republic) R Voráčová	4	3
3	(Zimbabwe) C Black (Russia) E Likhovtseva	6	6

Second round
7	(Slovakia) J Husárová (Spain) C Martínez	7	6
(South Africa) K Grant (Australia) B Stewart	5	2
WC	(United States) B Mattek (United States) S Perry	2	4
12	(Slovakia) D Hantuchová (United States) C Rubin	6	6
15	(Slovenia) T Križan (Slovenia) K Srebotnik	5	6	6
WC	(United States) C Gullickson (United States) S Taylor	7	1	2
(France) É Loit (Italy) F Schiavone	4	3
3	(Zimbabwe) C Black (Russia) E Likhovtseva	6	6

Third round
7	(Slovakia) J Husárová (Spain) C Martínez	6	6
12	(Slovakia) D Hantuchová (United States) C Rubin	2	3
15	(Slovenia) T Križan (Slovenia) K Srebotnik	1	2
3	(Zimbabwe) C Black (Russia) E Likhovtseva	6	6

Quarterfinals
7	(Slovakia) J Husárová (Spain) C Martínez	6^{4}	3
3	(Zimbabwe) C Black (Russia) E Likhovtseva	7^{7}	6

==== Section 4 ====
First round
5	(Russia) E Bovina (Australia) R Stubbs	6	6
(United States) A Augustus (Slovakia) K Habšudová	1	2
(Czech Republic) D Bedáňová (Ukraine) E Tatarkova	6	5	6
(China) Z Yan (China) J Zheng	4	7	1
(United States) A Cargill (Australia) C Wheeler	6	2	6
(United States) J Embry (United States) J Hopkins	3	6	4
(China) T Li (China) T Sun	6	5	4
10	(Russia) N Petrova (France) M Pierce	3	7	6
16	(Chinese Taipei) J Lee (Indonesia) W Prakusya	6	3	6^{2}
(Belgium) E Callens (United States) M Tu	3	6	7^{7}
(United States) L Granville (United States) A Stevenson	6	6
(Croatia) I Majoli (Spain) M Marrero	1	4
(Australia) R McQuillan (Paraguay) R Neffa-de los Ríos	6^{2}	4
(Argentina) P Tarabini (Netherlands) C Vis	7^{7}	6
(Japan) R Fujiwara (Japan) S Obata	2	5
2	(Spain) V Ruano Pascual (Argentina) P Suárez	6	7

Second round
5	(Russia) E Bovina (Australia) R Stubbs	7^{7}	6
(Czech Republic) D Bedáňová (Ukraine) E Tatarkova	6^{4}	1
(United States) A Cargill (Australia) C Wheeler	3	2
10	(Russia) N Petrova (France) M Pierce	6	6
(Belgium) E Callens (United States) M Tu	6	6
(United States) L Granville (United States) A Stevenson	2	1
(Argentina) P Tarabini (Netherlands) C Vis	3	3
2	(Spain) V Ruano Pascual (Argentina) P Suárez	6	6

Third round
5	(Russia) E Bovina (Australia) R Stubbs	6	7^{7}
10	(Russia) N Petrova (France) M Pierce	1	6^{3}
(Belgium) E Callens (United States) M Tu	7^{7}	2	2
2	(Spain) V Ruano Pascual (Argentina) P Suárez	6^{4}	6	6

Quarterfinals
5	(Russia) E Bovina (Australia) R Stubbs	3	6^{4}
2	(Spain) V Ruano Pascual (Argentina) P Suárez	6	7^{7}
