= 2003 US Open – Men's doubles =

Men's doubles
- 2003 US Open

Final
- Champion: (Sweden) Jonas Björkman (Australia) Todd Woodbridge
- Runner-up: (United States) Bob Bryan (United States) Mike Bryan
- Score: 5–7, 6–0, 7–5

Details
- Draw: 64
- Seeds: 16

Events
Singles	men	women		boys	girls
Doubles	men	women	mixed	boys	girls
WC Singles	men	women	quad
WC Doubles	men	women	quad
Legends	men	women	mixed
← 2002 ·	US Open	· 2004 →

Mahesh Bhupathi and Max Mirnyi were the defending champions, but lost in the quarterfinals to Michaël Llodra and Fabrice Santoro.

Jonas Björkman and Todd Woodbridge won the title, defeating Bob Bryan and Mike Bryan 5–7, 6–0, 7–5 in the final.

== Seeds ==
1. (India) Mahesh Bhupathi / (Belarus) Max Mirnyi (quarterfinals)
2. (United States) Bob Bryan / (United States) Mike Bryan (final)
3. (The Bahamas) Mark Knowles / (Canada) Daniel Nestor (semifinals)
4. (Sweden) Jonas Björkman / (Australia) Todd Woodbridge (champions)
5. (Australia) Wayne Arthurs / (Australia) Paul Hanley (quarterfinals)
6. (France) Michaël Llodra / (France) Fabrice Santoro (semifinals)
7. (Russia) Yevgeny Kafelnikov / (Czech Republic) David Rikl (first round)
8. (Czech Republic) Martin Damm / (Czech Republic) Cyril Suk (quarterfinals)
9. (Zimbabwe) Wayne Black / (Zimbabwe) Kevin Ullyett (third round)
10. (Australia) Joshua Eagle / (United States) Jared Palmer (third round)
11. (Argentina) Gastón Etlis / (Argentina) Martín Rodríguez (first round)
12. (Czech Republic) Tomáš Cibulec / (Czech Republic) Pavel Vízner (second round)
13. (South Africa) Chris Haggard / (United States) Donald Johnson (third round)
14. (Czech Republic) František Čermák / (Czech Republic) Leoš Friedl (third round)
15. (Argentina) Lucas Arnold Ker / (Argentina) Mariano Hood (third round)
16. (Czech Republic) Jiří Novák / (Czech Republic) Radek Štěpánek (second round)

== Draw ==
=== Key ===
- Q = Qualifier
- WC = Wild card
- LL = Lucky loser
- Alt = Alternate
- SE = Special exempt
- PR = Protected ranking
- ITF = ITF entry
- JE = Junior exempt
- w/o = Walkover
- r = Retired
- d = Defaulted
- SR = Special ranking

=== Finals ===
Quarterfinals
1	(India) Mahesh Bhupathi (Belarus) Max Mirnyi	2	2
6	(France) Michaël Llodra (France) Fabrice Santoro	6	6
4	(Sweden) Jonas Björkman (Australia) Todd Woodbridge	6	7^{7}
8	(Czech Republic) Martin Damm (Czech Republic) Cyril Suk	3	6^{4}
5	(Australia) Wayne Arthurs (Australia) Paul Hanley	4	5
3	(The Bahamas) Mark Knowles (Canada) Daniel Nestor	6	7
(Croatia) Mario Ančić (Croatia) Ivan Ljubičić	4	6	6^{4}
2	(United States) Bob Bryan (United States) Mike Bryan	6	2	7^{7}

Semifinals
6	(France) Michaël Llodra (France) Fabrice Santoro	6^{2}	2
4	(Sweden) Jonas Björkman (Australia) Todd Woodbridge	7^{7}	6
3	(The Bahamas) Mark Knowles (Canada) Daniel Nestor	3	0
2	(United States) Bob Bryan (United States) Mike Bryan	6	6

Final
4	(Sweden) Jonas Björkman (Australia) Todd Woodbridge	5	6	7
2	(United States) Bob Bryan (United States) Mike Bryan	7	0	5

=== Top half ===
==== Section 1 ====
First round
1	(India) M Bhupathi (Belarus) M Mirnyi	6	7^{7}
(Slovakia) D Hrbatý (Brazil) A Sá	3	6^{3}
(Russia) A Olhovskiy (Armenia) S Sargisian	2	4
(France) A Dupuis (South Korea) H-t Lee	6	6
(Australia) T Perry (Belgium) O Rochus	3	6	7^{7}
(United States) D Bowen (Australia) A Fisher	6	4	6^{2}
(Argentina) J Acasuso (Argentina) G Gaudio	2	0
15	(Argentina) L Arnold Ker (Argentina) M Hood	6	6
9	(Zimbabwe) W Black (Zimbabwe) K Ullyett	6	4	7
(Spain) D Ferrer (Spain) F Vicente	2	6	5
WC	(United States) R Ginepri (United States) B Reynolds	6	6
WC	(United States) R Ram (United States) B Wilson	4	4
(Belgium) X Malisse (Belgium) T Vanhoudt	6	6
(Russia) N Davydenko (Austria) S Koubek	1	3
(Morocco) H Arazi (Morocco) Y El Aynaoui	3	4
6	(France) M Llodra (France) F Santoro	6	6

Second round
1	(India) M Bhupathi (Belarus) M Mirnyi	6^{7}	7^{7}	6
(France) A Dupuis (South Korea) H-t Lee	7^{9}	6^{4}	3
(Australia) T Perry (Belgium) O Rochus	1	1
15	(Argentina) L Arnold Ker (Argentina) M Hood	6	6
9	(Zimbabwe) W Black (Zimbabwe) K Ullyett	6	7
WC	(United States) R Ginepri (United States) B Reynolds	4	5
(Belgium) X Malisse (Belgium) T Vanhoudt	2	4
6	(France) M Llodra (France) F Santoro	6	6

Third round
1	(India) M Bhupathi (Belarus) M Mirnyi	7^{10}	6
15	(Argentina) L Arnold Ker (Argentina) M Hood	6^{8}	2
9	(Zimbabwe) W Black (Zimbabwe) K Ullyett	3	3
6	(France) M Llodra (France) F Santoro	6	6

Quarterfinals
1	(India) M Bhupathi (Belarus) M Mirnyi	2	2
6	(France) M Llodra (France) F Santoro	6	6

==== Section 2 ====
First round
4	(Sweden) J Björkman (Australia) T Woodbridge	6	6
(Spain) A Portas (Spain) T Robredo	3	3
(Switzerland) Y Allegro (Germany) R Schüttler	7^{7}	6^{4}	7
WC	(United States) M Fish (United States) B Hodge	6^{2}	7^{7}	5
(Ecuador) N Lapentti (Spain) F López	6	6
(United States) B Coupe (United States) V Spadea	1	4
(Argentina) J I Chela (Peru) L Horna	1	3
16	(Czech Republic) J Novák (Czech Republic) R Štěpánek	6	6
11	(Argentina) G Etlis (Argentina) M Rodríguez	3	4
(South Africa) R Koenig (Czech Republic) P Pála	6	6
(Argentina) S Prieto (United States) J Thomas	6	1	6
(Israel) J Erlich (Israel) A Ram	1	6	1
(Spain) A Martín (Chile) N Massú	2	4
(Netherlands) R Sluiter (Netherlands) M Verkerk	6	6
(Sweden) J Landsberg (United States) J Tarango	1	6	1
8	(Czech Republic) M Damm (Czech Republic) C Suk	6	3	6

Second round
4	(Sweden) J Björkman (Australia) T Woodbridge	6	6
(Switzerland) Y Allegro (Germany) R Schüttler	3	4
(Ecuador) N Lapentti (Spain) F López	w/o
16	(Czech Republic) J Novák (Czech Republic) R Štěpánek
(South Africa) R Koenig (Czech Republic) P Pála	5	6	4
(Argentina) S Prieto (United States) J Thomas	7	4	6
(Netherlands) R Sluiter (Netherlands) M Verkerk	4	4
8	(Czech Republic) M Damm (Czech Republic) C Suk	6	6

Third round
4	(Sweden) J Björkman (Australia) T Woodbridge	6	6
(Ecuador) N Lapentti (Spain) F López	1	4
(Argentina) S Prieto (United States) J Thomas	4	4
8	(Czech Republic) M Damm (Czech Republic) C Suk	6	6

Quarterfinals
4	(Sweden) J Björkman (Australia) T Woodbridge	6	7^{7}
8	(Czech Republic) M Damm (Czech Republic) C Suk	3	6^{4}

=== Bottom half ===
==== Section 3 ====
First round
5	(Australia) W Arthurs (Australia) P Hanley	7	6^{3}	6
(Chile) F González (Argentina) M Puerta	5	7^{7}	4
(United States) R Leach (United States) B Macphie	7	1
(Argentina) A Calleri (Argentina) A Schneiter	5	0^{r}
(Slovakia) K Kučera (Czech Republic) B Ulihrach	6	6
WC	(United States) T Dent (United States) J Morrison	4	4
(Germany) T Behrend (Russia) M Youzhny	3	0
10	(Australia) J Eagle (United States) J Palmer	6	6
14	(Czech Republic) F Čermák (Czech Republic) L Friedl	6^{4}	6	7^{7}
(Spain) JI Carrasco (Spain) A Costa	7^{7}	0	6^{2}
(Argentina) M García (United States) G Oliver	6	6
(South Africa) D Adams (Australia) A Kratzmann	1	4
(Germany) M Kohlmann (Austria) J Knowle	7^{10}	6^{5}	7^{9}
(Brazil) G Kuerten (Netherlands) J van Lottum	6^{8}	7^{7}	6^{7}
(Spain) R Nadal (Spain) D Sánchez	4	0
3	(The Bahamas) M Knowles (Canada) D Nestor	6	6

Second round
5	(Australia) W Arthurs (Australia) P Hanley	6	1	6
(United States) R Leach (United States) B Macphie	3	6	3
(Slovakia) K Kučera (Czech Republic) B Ulihrach
10	(Australia) J Eagle (United States) J Palmer	w/o
14	(Czech Republic) F Čermák (Czech Republic) L Friedl	3	6	6
(Argentina) M García (United States) G Oliver	6	3	4
(Germany) M Kohlmann (Austria) J Knowle	4	5
3	(The Bahamas) M Knowles (Canada) D Nestor	6	7

Third round
5	(Australia) W Arthurs (Australia) P Hanley	7^{7}	6^{2}	7
10	(Australia) J Eagle (United States) J Palmer	6^{4}	7^{7}	5
14	(Czech Republic) F Čermák (Czech Republic) L Friedl	4	4
3	(The Bahamas) M Knowles (Canada) D Nestor	6	6

Quarterfinals
5	(Australia) W Arthurs (Australia) P Hanley	4	5
3	(The Bahamas) M Knowles (Canada) D Nestor	6	7

==== Section 4 ====
First round
7	(Russia) Y Kafelnikov (Czech Republic) D Rikl	2	6	3
(Croatia) M Ančić (Croatia) I Ljubičić	6	4	6
(Austria) J Melzer (Italy) F Volandri	1	7^{7}	6
(Sweden) S Aspelin (Italy) M Bertolini	6	6^{4}	3
(Czech Republic) P Luxa (Czech Republic) D Škoch	6	6
WC	(United States) A Kim (United States) J Salzenstein	2	4
(United States) J Gimelstob (Serbia and Montenegro) N Zimonjić	6^{3}	6	5
12	(Czech Republic) T Cibulec (Czech Republic) P Vízner	7^{7}	2	7
13	(South Africa) C Haggard (United States) D Johnson	6	5	7^{7}
(United States) S Humphries (The Bahamas) M Merklein	3	7	6^{3}
(South Africa) J Coetzee (South Africa) J-F de Jager	1	2
(Australia) N Healey (Australia) J Kerr	6	6
(Spain) Á López Morón (Spain) F Mantilla	7^{7}	6
WC	(United States) P Dabir (United States) J Isner	6^{2}	2
WC	(United States) J-M Gambill (United States) T Parrott	4	2
2	(United States) B Bryan (United States) M Bryan	6	6

Second round
(Croatia) M Ančić (Croatia) I Ljubičić	4	6	7
(Austria) J Melzer (Italy) F Volandri	6	3	5
(Czech Republic) P Luxa (Czech Republic) D Škoch	7^{7}	3	7
12	(Czech Republic) T Cibulec (Czech Republic) P Vízner	6^{5}	6	5
13	(South Africa) C Haggard (United States) D Johnson	6^{3}	6	7^{9}
(Australia) N Healey (Australia) J Kerr	7^{7}	4	6^{7}
(Spain) Á López Morón (Spain) F Mantilla	5	4
2	(United States) B Bryan (United States) M Bryan	7	6

Third round
(Croatia) M Ančić (Croatia) I Ljubičić	5	6	6
(Czech Republic) P Luxa (Czech Republic) D Škoch	7	1	2
13	(South Africa) C Haggard (United States) D Johnson	3	5
2	(United States) B Bryan (United States) M Bryan	6	7

Quarterfinals
(Croatia) M Ančić (Croatia) I Ljubičić	4	6	6^{4}
2	(United States) B Bryan (United States) M Bryan	6	2	7^{7}
