= 2003 US Open – Mixed doubles =

Mixed doubles
- 2003 US Open

Final
- Champions: (Slovenia) Katarina Srebotnik (United States) Bob Bryan
- Runners-up: (Russia) Lina Krasnoroutskaya (Canada) Daniel Nestor
- Score: 5–7, 7–5, [10–5]

Details
- Draw: 32
- Seeds: 8

Events
Singles	men	women		boys	girls
Doubles	men	women	mixed	boys	girls
WC Singles	men	women	quad
WC Doubles	men	women	quad
Legends	men	women	mixed
- US Open

Katarina Srebotnik and Bob Bryan defeated Lina Krasnoroutskaya and Daniel Nestor in the final, 5–7, 7–5, [10–5] to win the mixed doubles tennis title at the 2003 US Open.

Lisa Raymond and Mike Bryan were the defending champions, but lost in the quarterfinals to Cara Black and Wayne Black.

== Seeds ==
1. (Argentina) Paola Suárez / (India) Mahesh Bhupathi (second round, withdrew)
2. (United States) Lisa Raymond / (United States) Mike Bryan (quarterfinals)
3. (Spain) Virginia Ruano Pascual / (The Bahamas) Mark Knowles (quarterfinals)
4. (Russia) Elena Likhovtseva / (Australia) Todd Woodbridge (second round)
5. (Russia) Lina Krasnoroutskaya / (Canada) Daniel Nestor (final)
6. (Slovakia) Janette Husárová / (Czech Republic) Leoš Friedl (semifinal)
7. (Zimbabwe) Cara Black / (Zimbabwe) Wayne Black (semifinal)
8. (Slovenia) Katarina Srebotnik / (United States) Bob Bryan (champions)

== Draw ==
Key

- Q = Qualifier
- WC = Wild card
- LL = Lucky loser
- Alt = Alternate
- ITF = ITF entry
- PR = Protected ranking
- SR = Special ranking
- SE = Special exempt
- JE = Junior exempt
- JR = Junior Accelerator Programme entrant
- CO = College Accelerator Programme entrant
- NG = Next Gen Accelerator Program entrant
- w/o = Walkover
- r = Retired
- d = Defaulted

=== Finals ===
Semifinals
6	(Slovakia) Janette Husárová (Czech Republic) Leoš Friedl	1	3
8	(Slovenia) Katarina Srebotnik (United States) Bob Bryan	6	6
5	(Russia) Lina Krasnoroutskaya (Canada) Daniel Nestor	7^{7}	7^{7}
7	(Zimbabwe) Cara Black (Zimbabwe) Wayne Black	6^{2}	6^{5}

Final
8	(Slovenia) Katarina Srebotnik (United States) Bob Bryan	5	7	[10]
5	(Russia) Lina Krasnoroutskaya (Canada) Daniel Nestor	7	5	[5]

=== Top half ===
First round
1	(Argentina) P Suárez (India) M Bhupathi	6^{7}	6	[10]
(Hungary) P Mandula (United States) G Oliver	7^{9}	4	[6]
(South Africa) L Huber (Czech Republic) P Vízner	6	6
(Switzerland) E Gagliardi (Czech Republic) D Rikl	3	2
(Japan) N Miyagi (Czech Republic) C Suk	5	6	[10]
(Federal Republic of Yugoslavia) J Dokic (Federal Republic of Yugoslavia) N Zimonjić	7	3	[5]
WC	(United States) M Washington (United States) J Tarango	4	4
6	(Slovakia) J Husárová (Czech Republic) L Friedl	6	6
3	(Spain) V Ruano Pascual (The Bahamas) M Knowles	6	6
WC	(United States) A Cargill (United States) B Vahaly	1	2
WC	(United States) M Shaughnessy (United States) R Leach	5	6	[10]
(United States) C Rubin (Sweden) J Björkman	7	4	[5]
(Austria) P Wartusch (Czech Republic) F Čermák	3	3
(Australia) R Stubbs (United States) D Johnson	6	6
(Belgium) E Callens (Argentina) G Etlis	3	6^{6}
8	(Slovenia) K Srebotnik (United States) B Bryan	6	7^{8}

Second round
1	(Argentina) P Suárez (India) M Bhupathi
(South Africa) L Huber (Czech Republic) P Vízner	w/o
(Japan) N Miyagi (Czech Republic) C Suk	3	6	[5]
6	(Slovakia) J Husárová (Czech Republic) L Friedl	6	3	[10]
3	(Spain) V Ruano Pascual (The Bahamas) M Knowles	w/o
WC	(United States) M Shaughnessy (United States) R Leach
(Australia) R Stubbs (United States) D Johnson	6	3	[6]
8	(Slovenia) K Srebotnik (United States) B Bryan	4	6	[10]

Quarterfinals
(South Africa) L Huber (Czech Republic) P Vízner	5	4
6	(Slovakia) J Husárová (Czech Republic) L Friedl	7	6
3	(Spain) V Ruano Pascual (The Bahamas) M Knowles	6	2	[7]
8	(Slovenia) K Srebotnik (United States) B Bryan	2	6	[10]

Semifinals
6	(Slovakia) J Husárová (Czech Republic) L Friedl	1	3
8	(Slovenia) K Srebotnik (United States) B Bryan	6	6

=== Bottom half ===
First round
5	(Russia) L Krasnoroutskaya (Canada) D Nestor	6	7
(Slovakia) D Hantuchová (Zimbabwe) K Ullyett	4	5
(Venezuela) M Vento-Kabchi (Argentina) M Hood	6	6
(Israel) A Pistolesi (South Africa) J Coetzee	2	4
WC	(United States) A Stevenson (United States) V Spadea	7^{8}	2	[10]
(Russia) V Zvonareva (Australia) J Eagle	6^{6}	6	[8]
WC	(United States) C Morariu (United States) J Gimelstob	0	5
4	(Russia) E Likhovtseva (Australia) T Woodbridge	6	7
7	(Zimbabwe) C Black (Zimbabwe) W Black	7	6
(Czech Republic) D Chládková (Czech Republic) M Damm	5	0
(Greece) E Daniilidou (South Africa) C Haggard	6	7^{8}
WC	(United States) A Harkleroad (United States) A Bogomolov Jr.	3	6^{6}
(Chinese Taipei) J Lee (United States) J Palmer	2	7	[10]
(Russia) A Myskina (United States) B MacPhie	6	5	[7]
(Australia) N Pratt (Australia) P Hanley	3	5
2	(United States) L Raymond (United States) M Bryan	6	7

Second round
5	(Russia) L Krasnoroutskaya (Canada) D Nestor	7	6
(Venezuela) M Vento-Kabchi (Argentina) M Hood	5	3
WC	(United States) A Stevenson (United States) V Spadea	6	6^{5}	[10]
4	(Russia) E Likhovtseva (Australia) T Woodbridge	1	7^{7}	[8]
7	(Zimbabwe) C Black (Zimbabwe) W Black	4	7^{7}	[10]
(Greece) E Daniilidou (South Africa) C Haggard	6	6^{5}	[5]
(Chinese Taipei) J Lee (United States) J Palmer	0	1
2	(United States) L Raymond (United States) M Bryan	6	6

Quarterfinals
5	(Russia) L Krasnoroutskaya (Canada) D Nestor	6	6
WC	(United States) A Stevenson (United States) V Spadea	1	1
7	(Zimbabwe) C Black (Zimbabwe) W Black	7^{7}	6
2	(United States) L Raymond (United States) M Bryan	6^{4}	2

Semifinals
5	(Russia) L Krasnoroutskaya (Canada) D Nestor	7^{7}	7^{7}
7	(Zimbabwe) C Black (Zimbabwe) W Black	6^{2}	6^{5}
