= 2003 US Open (tennis) =

- Date: August 25 - September 7
- Edition: 123rd
- Category: Grand Slam (ITF)
- Surface: Hardcourt
- Location: New York City, U.S.
- Venue: USTA Billie Jean King National Tennis Center

Champions

Men's singles
- (United States) Andy Roddick

Women's singles
- (Belgium) Justine Henin-Hardenne

Men's doubles
- (Sweden) Jonas Björkman / (Australia) Todd Woodbridge

Women's doubles
- (Spain) Virginia Ruano Pascual / (Argentina) Paola Suárez

Mixed doubles
- (United States) Bob Bryan / (Slovenia) Katarina Srebotnik

Boys' singles
- (France) Jo-Wilfried Tsonga

Girls' singles
- (Belgium) Kirsten Flipkens
← 2002 ·	US Open	· 2004 →

The 2003 US Open was held between August 25 – September 7, 2003.

Both Pete Sampras and Serena Williams did not defend their titles from 2002; Sampras unofficially retired after winning his final Grand Slam title the previous year, and Serena Williams was forced to miss the tournament after withdrawing through injury. This was the first time since 1971 in which neither champion was able to defend their title.

Andy Roddick, who previously won the 2000 US Open as a junior, won his only Grand Slam title, defeating Juan Carlos Ferrero (who inherited the World No.1 ranking after the tournament) in the final. Justine Henin-Hardenne won her first US Open title and second Grand Slam title, defeating her compatriot, rival and future 3-time US Open champion Kim Clijsters in the final, dropping only one set through her run.

== Seniors ==
=== Men's singles ===
(United States) Andy Roddick defeated (Spain) Juan Carlos Ferrero, 6–3, 7–6^{(7–2)}, 6–3

• It was Roddick's 1st and only career Grand Slam singles title. It was Roddick's 6th title of the year, and his 11th overall.

=== Women's singles ===
(Belgium) Justine Henin-Hardenne defeated (Belgium) Kim Clijsters, 7–5, 6–1

• It was Henin-Hardenne's 2nd career Grand Slam singles title and her 1st title at the US Open. It was Henin-Hardenne's 7th title of the year, and her 13th overall. She became the first Belgian tennis player to win the US Open singles crown.

=== Men's doubles ===
(Sweden) Jonas Björkman / (Australia) Todd Woodbridge defeated (United States) Mike Bryan / (United States) Bob Bryan, 5–7, 6–0, 7–5

• It was Björkman's 6th career Grand Slam doubles title and his 1st and only title at the US Open.
• It was Woodbridge's 15th career Grand Slam doubles title and his 3rd and last title at the US Open.

=== Women's doubles ===
(Spain) Virginia Ruano Pascual / (Argentina) Paola Suárez defeated (Russia) Svetlana Kuznetsova / (United States) Martina Navratilova, 6–2, 6–3

• It was Ruano Pascual's 4th career Grand Slam doubles title and her 2nd title at the US Open.
• It was Suárez' 4th career Grand Slam doubles title and her 2nd title at the US Open.

=== Mixed doubles ===
(Slovenia) Katarina Srebotnik / (United States) Bob Bryan defeated (Russia) Lina Krasnoroutskaya / (Canada) Daniel Nestor, 5–7, 7–5, 7–6^{(7–5)}

• It was Srebotnik's 2nd career Grand Slam mixed doubles title and her 1st and only title at the US Open.
• It was Bryan's 1st career Grand Slam mixed doubles title.

== Juniors ==
=== Boys' singles ===
(France) Jo-Wilfried Tsonga defeated (Cyprus) Marcos Baghdatis, 7–6, 6–3

=== Girls' singles ===
(Belgium) Kirsten Flipkens defeated (Netherlands) Michaëlla Krajicek, 6–3, 7–5

=== Boys' doubles ===
Not played due to inclement weather.

=== Girls' doubles ===
Not played due to inclement weather.

Preceded by 2003 Wimbledon Championships	Grand Slams	Succeeded by 2004 Australian Open
