= Albina Khabibulina =

Uzbekistani tennis player

- Country (sports): Uzbekistan; Kazakhstan
- Born: 11 May 1992 (age 34) Tashkent
- Height: 1.62 m (5 ft 4 in)
- Plays: Right-handed (two-handed backhand)
- Prize money: $78,468

Singles
- Career record: 191–191
- Career titles: 1 ITF
- Highest ranking: No. 492 (4 July 2011)

Doubles
- Career record: 266–143
- Career titles: 31 ITF
- Highest ranking: No. 208 (4 August 2014)

Team competitions
- Fed Cup: 11–13

Albina Khabibulina (born 11 May 1992) is a Kazakhstani padel player, and former professional tennis player and member of the Uzbekistan Fed Cup team. She is of Tatar descent.

On 4 July 2011, she reached her highest WTA singles ranking of 492, whilst her best doubles ranking was 208 on 4 August 2014.

Playing for the Uzbekistan Fed Cup team, Khabibulina has a win-loss record of 11–13.

As of November 2019, Khabibulina has been provisionally suspended by the Tennis Integrity Unit.

== ITF Circuit finals ==
=== Singles: 7 (1 title, 6 runner-ups) ===
Legend $50,000 tournaments $25,000 tournaments $15,000 tournaments $10,000 tournaments	Finals by surface Hard (0–2) Clay (1–4)

Result	No.	Date	Tournament	Surface	Opponent	Score
Loss	1.	May 2008	ITF Bangkok, Thailand	Hard	(South Korea) Kim Sun-jung	5–7, 6–7^{(5)}
Loss	2.	Jun 2008	ITF Almaty, Kazakhstan	Clay	(Russia) Yuliya Kalabina	4–6, 3–6
Win	1.	Apr 2009	ITF Shymkent, Kazakhstan	Clay	(India) Poojashree Venkatesha	6–7^{(5)}, 6–3, 6–1
Loss	3.	Nov 2013	ITF Astana, Kazakhstan	Hard (i)	(Kazakhstan) Kamila Kerimbayeva	1–6, 3–6
Loss	4.	Apr 2017	ITF Shymkent, Kazakhstan	Clay	(Kazakhstan) Kamila Kerimbayeva	4–6, 0–6
Loss	5.	Jun 2017	ITF Minsk, Belarus	Clay	(Russia) Daria Kruzhkova	6–7^{(3)}, 3–6
Loss	6.	Aug 2017	ITF Oldenzaal, Netherlands	Clay	(United States) Chiara Scholl	1–6, 1–6

=== Doubles: 51 (31 titles, 20 runner-ups) ===
Result	No.	Date	Tournament	Surface	Partner	Opponents	Score
Loss	1.	May 2008	ITF Bangkok, Thailand	Hard	(Uzbekistan) Dilyara Saidkhodjayeva	(Thailand) Napaporn Tongsalee (Thailand) Suchanun Viratprasert	6–1, 6–7^{(3)}, [8–10]
Loss	2.	Sep 2008	ITF Qarshi, Uzbekistan	Hard	(Uzbekistan) Alexandra Kolesnichenko	(Belarus) Ima Bohush (Ukraine) Lesia Tsurenko	3–6, 1–6
Win	1.	1 May 2009	ITF Namangan, Uzbekistan	Hard	(Kyrgyzstan) Ksenia Palkina	(Turkey) Çağla Büyükakçay (Turkey) Pemra Özgen	6–4, 6–7^{(6)}, [10–5]
Win	2.	4 September 2009	ITF Nonthaburi, Thailand	Hard	(Thailand) Kanyapat Narattana	(Indonesia) Lavinia Tananta (Thailand) Varatchaya Wongteanchai	5–7, 6–4, [10–8]
Win	3.	17 October 2009	ITF Antalya, Turkey	Clay	(Turkey) Çağla Büyükakçay	(United Kingdom) Amanda Carreras (Italy) Valentina Confalonieri	2–6, 7–5, [10–7]
Win	4.	30 July 2010	ITF Almaty, Kazakhstan	Hard	(Kyrgyzstan) Ksenia Palkina	(Ukraine) Yulia Beygelzimer (United Kingdom) Emily Webley-Smith	6–4, 6–4
Loss	3.	14 August 2010	Tatarstan Open, Russia	Hard	(Kyrgyzstan) Ksenia Palkina	(Belarus) Ekaterina Dzehalevich (Ukraine) Lesia Tsurenko	2–6, 3–6
Win	5.	25 March 2011	ITF Namangan, Uzbekistan	Hard	(Uzbekistan) Nigina Abduraimova	(Russia) Ekaterina Bychkova (Russia) Marina Shamayko	4–6, 7–6^{(4)}, [10–8]
Win	6.	8 April 2011	ITF Almaty, Kazakhstan	Hard (i)	(Slovakia) Zuzana Luknárová	(Belarus) Lidziya Marozava (Belarus) Sviatlana Pirazhenka	7–6^{(2)}, 4–6, [10–5]
Win	7.	22 April 2011	ITF Qarshi, Uzbekistan	Hard	(Uzbekistan) Nigina Abduraimova	(Ukraine) Anna Shkudun (Russia) Ekaterina Yashina	6–1, 6–2
Win	8.	30 July 2011	Fergana Challenger, Uzbekistan	Hard	(Uzbekistan) Nigina Abduraimova	(United States) Elizaveta Anna Nemchev (Turkmenistan) Anastasiya Prenko	6–3, 6–3
Loss	4.	17 March 2012	ITF Astana, Kazakhstan	Hard (i)	(Belarus) Ilona Kremen	(Russia) Eugeniya Pashkova (Ukraine) Anastasiya Vasylyeva	5–7, 2–6
Loss	5.	24 March 2012	ITF Almaty, Kazakhstan	Hard (i)	(Belarus) Ilona Kremen	(Georgia (country)) Oksana Kalashnikova (Russia) Eugeniya Pashkova	1–6, 5–7
Win	9.	28 April 2012	ITF Andijan, Uzbekistan	Hard	(Ukraine) Anastasiya Vasylyeva	(Uzbekistan) Sabina Sharipova (Russia) Ekaterina Yashina	6–0, 6–2
Win	10.	5 May 2012	ITF Shymkent, Kazakhstan	Hard	(Ukraine) Anastasiya Vasylyeva	(Russia) Maya Gaverova (Kyrgyzstan) Ksenia Palkina	3–6, 6–1, [10–6]
Loss	6.	12 May 2012	ITF Almaty, Kazakhstan	Hard	(Ukraine) Anastasiya Vasylyeva	(Uzbekistan) Sabina Sharipova (Russia) Ekaterina Yashina	4–6, 6–3, [3–10]
Loss	7.	19 May 2012	Fergana Challenger, Uzbekistan	Hard	(Ukraine) Anastasiya Vasylyeva	(Ukraine) Lyudmyla Kichenok (Ukraine) Nadiya Kichenok	4–6, 1–6
Loss	8.	2 June 2012	ITF Qarshi, Uzbekistan	Hard	(Ukraine) Anastasiya Vasylyeva	(Belarus) Darya Lebesheva (Russia) Ekaterina Yashina	6–7^{(5)}, 2–6
Win	11.	19 April 2013	ITF Namangan, Uzbekistan	Hard	(Ukraine) Anastasiya Vasylyeva	(Ukraine) Valentyna Ivakhnenko (Kyrgyzstan) Ksenia Palkina	6–3, 6–3
Win	12.	27 April 2013	ITF Andijan, Uzbekistan	Hard	(Ukraine) Anastasiya Vasylyeva	(Russia) Polina Monova (Russia) Ekaterina Yashina	7–5, 6–4
Win	13.	4 May 2013	ITF Shymkent, Kazakhstan	Clay	(Ukraine) Anastasiya Vasylyeva	(Russia) Polina Monova (Russia) Anna Smolina	2–6, 6–4, [11–9]
Win	14.	12 May 2013	ITF Shymkent, Kazakhstan	Clay	(Kyrgyzstan) Ksenia Palkina	(Russia) Polina Monova (Russia) Anna Smolina	6–2, 6–2
Win	15.	2 June 2013	ITF Qarshi, Uzbekistan	Hard	(Ukraine) Alyona Sotnikova	(Uzbekistan) Sabina Sharipova (Russia) Ekaterina Yashina	7–5, 6–3
Loss	9.	10 August 2013	ITF Moscow, Russia	Hard	(Ukraine) Anastasiya Vasylyeva	(Ukraine) Alona Fomina (Ukraine) Anna Shkudun	2–6, 5–7
Loss	10.	17 November 2013	ITF Astana, Kazakhstan	Hard (i)	(Kyrgyzstan) Ksenia Palkina	(Russia) Polina Monova (Russia) Alena Tarasova	6–4, 1–6, [6–10]
Win	16.	24 November 2013	ITF Astana, Kazakhstan	Hard (i)	(Slovakia) Chantal Škamlová	(Kazakhstan) Asiya Dair (Russia) Ivanka Karamalak	6–2, 6–3
Win	17.	24 February 2014	ITF Astana, Kazakhstan	Hard (i)	(Kyrgyzstan) Ksenia Palkina	(Kazakhstan) Kamila Kerimbayeva (Ukraine) Veronika Kapshay	6–4, 7–5
Win	18.	14 April 2014	ITF Qarshi, Uzbekistan	Hard	(Ukraine) Anastasiya Vasylyeva	(Russia) Ekaterina Bychkova (Russia) Veronika Kudermetova	2–6, 7–5, [10–4]
Win	19.	28 April 2014	ITF Andijan, Uzbekistan	Hard	(Russia) Veronika Kudermetova	(Russia) Polina Monova (Russia) Yana Sizikova	6–4, 7–6^{(5)}
Loss	11.	16 June 2014	ITF Astana, Kazakhstan	Hard	(Kazakhstan) Ekaterina Kylueva	(Georgia (country)) Sofia Kvatsabaia (Montenegro) Ana Veselinović	6–7, 6–7
Win	20.	23 June 2014	ITF Astana, Kazakhstan	Hard	(Kazakhstan) Ekaterina Kylueva	(Russia) Anna Grigoryan (Russia) Julia Valetova	6–3, 6–1
Win	21.	29 September 2014	ITF Shymkent, Kazakhstan	Clay	(Belarus) Polina Pekhova	(Kyrgyzstan) Ksenia Palkina (Kazakhstan) Alexandra Grinchishina	w/o
Win	22.	6 October 2014	ITF Shymkent, Kazakhstan	Clay	(Kazakhstan) Ekaterina Kylueva	(Belarus) Polina Pekhova (Russia) Daria Lodikova	6–4, 6–4
Win	23.	24 November 2014	ITF Astana, Kazakhstan	Hard	(Uzbekistan) Polina Merenkova	(Kazakhstan) Kamila Kerimbayeva (Russia) Ekaterina Yashina	6–2, 6–2
Win	24.	25 January 2015	ITF Aktobe, Kazakhstan	Hard (i)	(Uzbekistan) Polina Merenkova	(Kazakhstan) Alexandra Grinchishina (Kazakhstan) Ekaterina Klyueva	6–4, 6–1
Win	25.	1 February 2015	ITF Aktobe, Kazakhstan	Hard (i)	(Uzbekistan) Polina Merenkova	(Kyrgyzstan) Ksenia Palkina (Netherlands) Eva Wacanno	6–2, 7–6^{(6)}
Win	26.	1 May 2015	ITF Shymkent, Kazakhstan	Clay	(Uzbekistan) Polina Merenkova	(Uzbekistan) Vlada Ekshibarova (Russia) Daria Lodikova	6–3, 6–1
Loss	12.	10 October 2015	ITF Shymkent, Kazakhstan	Clay	(Uzbekistan) Polina Merenkova	(Georgia (country)) Ekaterine Gorgodze (Georgia (country)) Sofia Kvatsabaia	5–7, 6–3, [6–10]
Win	27.	24 June 2017	ITF Kaltenkirchen, Germany	Clay	(Germany) Lisa Ponomar	(Australia) Gabriella Da Silva-Fick (Belgium) Magali Kempen	6–4, 6–0
Win	28.	25 August 2017	ITF Rotterdam, Netherlands	Clay	(Netherlands) Stephanie Judith Visscher	(Belgium) Deborah Kerfs (United States) Chiara Scholl	7–6^{(3)}, 7–5
Win	29.	7 October 2017	ITF Antalya, Turkey	Clay	(Turkey) İpek Öz	(Hungary) Réka Luca Jani (Ukraine) Sofiya Kovalets	7–5, 1–6, [11–9]
Loss	13.	1 December 2017	ITF Indore, India	Hard	(Kyrgyzstan) Ksenia Palkina	(Bosnia and Herzegovina) Dea Herdzelas (Chinese Taipei) Hsu Ching-wen	2–6, 1–6
Loss	14.	16 March 2018	ITF Gwalior, India	Hard	(United Kingdom) Freya Christie	(Russia) Yana Sizikova (Montenegro) Ana Veselinović	3–6, 6–2, [5–10]
Loss	15.	30 June 2018	Bella Cup Torún, Poland	Clay	(Belgium) Hélène Scholsen	(Poland) Maja Chwalińska (Poland) Katarzyna Kawa	1–6, 4–6
Win	30.	5 August 2018	ITF Bad Saulgau, Germany	Clay	(Belgium) Hélène Scholsen	(Croatia) Lea Bošković (United States) Chiara Scholl	6–2, 6–4
Loss	16.	14 September 2018	ITF Almaty, Kazakhstan	Clay	(Kyrgyzstan) Ksenia Palkina	(Ukraine) Maryna Chernyshova (Israel) Vlada Ekshibarova	6–7^{(3)}, 2–6
Win	31.	21 December 2018	ITF Navi Mumbai, India	Hard	(Russia) Ekaterina Yashina	(Turkey) Berfu Cengiz (Indonesia) Jessy Rompies	6–2, 6–1
Loss	17.	11 June 2019	ITF Kaltenkirchen, Germany	Clay	(Romania) Oana Georgeta Simion	(Australia) Gabriella Da Silva-Fick (Germany) Anna Klasen	4–6, 5–7
Loss	18.	21 June 2019	Open Montpellier, France	Clay	(Germany) Julia Wachaczyk	(Russia) Marina Melnikova (Netherlands) Eva Wacanno	6–4, 4–6, [3–10]
Loss	19.	July 2019	ITF Horb, Germany	Clay	(Georgia (country)) Sofia Shapatava	(Germany) Katharina Gerlach (Germany) Julia Wachaczyk	1–6, 3–6
Loss	20.	August 2019	ITF Braunschweig, Germany	Clay	(Uzbekistan) Akgul Amanmuradova	(Russia) Polina Leykina (France) Marine Partaud	4–6, 6–1, [5–10]
