= Taekwondo at the 2006 Asian Games =

Taekwondo competition

- Venue: Qatar SC Indoor Hall
- Dates: 7–10 December 2006
- Competitors: 251 from 34 nations

Taekwondo took place from December 7 to December 10 at the 2006 Asian Games in Doha, Qatar. Men's and women's competitions were held in eight weight categories for each. All competition took place at the Qatar Sports Club Indoor Hall. Each country except the host nation was limited to having 6 men and 6 women.

== Schedule ==
P	Preliminary rounds	F	Final

Event↓/Date →	7th Thu		8th Fri		9th Sat		10th Sun	
Men's 54 kg	P	F						
Men's 58 kg			P	F				
Men's 62 kg					P	F		
Men's 67 kg							P	F
Men's 72 kg	P	F						
Men's 78 kg			P	F				
Men's 84 kg					P	F		
Men's +84 kg							P	F
Women's 47 kg	P	F						
Women's 51 kg			P	F				
Women's 55 kg					P	F		
Women's 59 kg							P	F
Women's 63 kg	P	F						
Women's 67 kg			P	F				
Women's 72 kg					P	F		
Women's +72 kg							P	F

== Medalists ==
=== Men ===
Event	Gold	Silver	Bronze
Finweight (−54 kg)	Mohammad Al-Bakhit; Jordan	Vasavat Somswang; Thailand	Renat Kuralbayev; Kazakhstan
Finweight (−54 kg)	Mohammad Al-Bakhit; Jordan	Vasavat Somswang; Thailand	Abdulrahim Abdulhameed; Bahrain
Flyweight (−58 kg)	You Young-dae; South Korea	Nattapong Tewawetchapong; Thailand	Chu Mu-yen; Chinese Taipei
Flyweight (−58 kg)	You Young-dae; South Korea	Nattapong Tewawetchapong; Thailand	Behzad Khodadad; Iran
Bantamweight (−62 kg)	Kim Ju-young; South Korea	Tshomlee Go; Philippines	Vũ Anh Tuấn; Vietnam
Bantamweight (−62 kg)	Kim Ju-young; South Korea	Tshomlee Go; Philippines	Su Tai-yuan; Chinese Taipei
Featherweight (−67 kg)	Song Myeong-seob; South Korea	Jamil Al-Khuffash; Jordan	Alireza Nasr Azadani; Iran
Featherweight (−67 kg)	Song Myeong-seob; South Korea	Jamil Al-Khuffash; Jordan	Manuel Rivero; Philippines
Lightweight (−72 kg)	Lee Young-yeoul; South Korea	Wang Hao; China	Nesar Ahmad Bahave; Afghanistan
Lightweight (−72 kg)	Lee Young-yeoul; South Korea	Wang Hao; China	Hadi Saei; Iran
Welterweight (−78 kg)	Abdulqader Hikmat; Qatar	Mehdi Bibak; Iran	Liao Chia-hsing; Chinese Taipei
Welterweight (−78 kg)	Abdulqader Hikmat; Qatar	Mehdi Bibak; Iran	Deepak Bista; Nepal
Middleweight (−84 kg)	Yousef Karami; Iran	Park Kyeong-hoon; South Korea	Arman Chilmanov; Kazakhstan
Middleweight (−84 kg)	Yousef Karami; Iran	Park Kyeong-hoon; South Korea	Shokirjon Rajabov; Tajikistan
Heavyweight (+84 kg)	Kim Hak-hwan; South Korea	Mehdi Navaei; Iran	Abdulqader Al-Adhami; Qatar
Heavyweight (+84 kg)	Kim Hak-hwan; South Korea	Mehdi Navaei; Iran	Liu Xiaobo; China

=== Women ===
Event	Gold	Silver	Bronze
Finweight (−47 kg)	Wu Jingyu; China	Yang Shu-chun; Chinese Taipei	Yaowapa Boorapolchai; Thailand
Finweight (−47 kg)	Wu Jingyu; China	Yang Shu-chun; Chinese Taipei	Eunice Alora; Philippines
Flyweight (−51 kg)	Kwon Eun-kyung; South Korea	Wu Yen-ni; Chinese Taipei	Đỗ Thị Bích Hạnh; Vietnam
Flyweight (−51 kg)	Kwon Eun-kyung; South Korea	Wu Yen-ni; Chinese Taipei	Natthaya Sangsasiton; Thailand
Bantamweight (−55 kg)	Kim Bo-hye; South Korea	Hoàng Hà Giang; Vietnam	Saule Sardarova; Kazakhstan
Bantamweight (−55 kg)	Kim Bo-hye; South Korea	Hoàng Hà Giang; Vietnam	Cosette Basbous; Lebanon
Featherweight (−59 kg)	Lee Sung-hye; South Korea	Nguyễn Thị Hoài Thu; Vietnam	Ayasha Shakya; Nepal
Featherweight (−59 kg)	Lee Sung-hye; South Korea	Nguyễn Thị Hoài Thu; Vietnam	Tseng Pei-hua; Chinese Taipei
Lightweight (−63 kg)	Su Li-wen; Chinese Taipei	Chonnapas Premwaew; Thailand	Veronica Domingo; Philippines
Lightweight (−63 kg)	Su Li-wen; Chinese Taipei	Chonnapas Premwaew; Thailand	Manita Shahi; Nepal
Welterweight (−67 kg)	Hwang Kyung-seon; South Korea	Toni Rivero; Philippines	Bùi Thu Hiền; Vietnam
Welterweight (−67 kg)	Hwang Kyung-seon; South Korea	Toni Rivero; Philippines	Jiang Lingling; China
Middleweight (−72 kg)	Luo Wei; China	Alaa Kutkut; Jordan	Mahrouz Saei; Iran
Middleweight (−72 kg)	Luo Wei; China	Alaa Kutkut; Jordan	Lee In-jong; South Korea
Heavyweight (+72 kg)	Chen Zhong; China	Evgeniya Karimova; Uzbekistan	Afsaneh Sheikhi; Iran
Heavyweight (+72 kg)	Chen Zhong; China	Evgeniya Karimova; Uzbekistan	Amalia Kurniasih Palupi; Indonesia

== Medal table ==
Rank	Nation	Gold	Silver	Bronze	Total
1	South Korea (KOR)	9	1	1	11
2	China (CHN)	3	1	2	6
3	Iran (IRI)	1	2	5	8
4	Chinese Taipei (TPE)	1	2	4	7
5	Jordan (JOR)	1	2	0	3
6	Qatar (QAT)	1	0	1	2
7	Thailand (THA)	0	3	2	5
8	Philippines (PHI)	0	2	3	5
8	Vietnam (VIE)	0	2	3	5
10	Uzbekistan (UZB)	0	1	0	1
11	Kazakhstan (KAZ)	0	0	3	3
11	Nepal (NEP)	0	0	3	3
13	Afghanistan (AFG)	0	0	1	1
13	Bahrain (BRN)	0	0	1	1
13	Indonesia (INA)	0	0	1	1
13	Lebanon (LIB)	0	0	1	1
13	Tajikistan (TJK)	0	0	1	1
Totals (17 entries)		16	16	32	64

== Participating nations ==
A total of 251 athletes from 34 nations competed in taekwondo at the 2006 Asian Games:

- Afghanistan (9)
- Bahrain (7)
- Bangladesh (1)
- Bhutan (8)
- Cambodia (3)
- China (11)
- Chinese Taipei (12)
- India (6)
- Indonesia (6)
- Iran (12)
- Japan (1)
- Jordan (11)
- Kazakhstan (12)
- Kuwait (10)
- Kyrgyzstan (4)
- Laos (4)
- Lebanon (11)
- Macau (5)
- Mongolia (1)
- Nepal (9)
- Pakistan (4)
- Palestine (6)
- Philippines (12)
- Qatar (10)
- Saudi Arabia (6)
- South Korea (12)
- Sri Lanka (4)
- Syria (4)
- Tajikistan (10)
- Thailand (10)
- Timor-Leste (3)
- Uzbekistan (9)
- Vietnam (12)
- Yemen (6)
