= Indonesia at the 2006 Asian Games =

- IOC code: INA
- NOC: Indonesian Olympic Committee
- Website: www.nocindonesia.or.id (in English)

in Doha
- Flag bearer: Andy Ardiyansah
- Medals Ranked 22nd: Gold 2 Silver 4 Bronze 14 Total 20

Asian Games appearances (overview)
- 1951; 1954; 1958; 1962; 1966; 1970; 1974; 1978; 1982; 1986; 1990; 1994; 1998; 2002; 2006; 2010; 2014; 2018; 2022; 2026

Indonesia participated in the 2006 Asian Games held in the city of Doha, Qatar from 1 December 2006 to 15 December 2006. Indonesia ranked 20th with 2 gold medals in this edition of the Asiad.

== Competitors ==
| Sport | Men | Women | Total |
|---|---|---|---|
| Archery | 1 | 4 | 5 |
| Badminton | 8 | 8 | 16 |
| Beach volleyball | 4 | 0 | 4 |
| Bodybuilding | 2 | 0 | 2 |
| Bowling | 6 | 6 | 12 |
| Canoeing | 5 | 1 | 6 |
| Chess | 2 | 1 | 3 |
| Cue sports | 2 | 0 | 2 |
| Cycling | 6 | 1 | 7 |
| Equestrian | 4 | 0 | 4 |
| Football | 20 | 0 | 20 |
| Judo | 2 | 0 | 2 |
| Karate | 5 | 3 | 8 |
| Rowing | 5 | 1 | 6 |
| Sailing | 2 | 0 | 2 |
| Sepaktakraw | 12 | 0 | 12 |
| Taekwondo | 4 | 2 | 6 |
| Tennis | 0 | 4 | 4 |
| Weightlifting | 2 | 3 | 5 |
| Wushu | 2 | 1 | 3 |
| Total | 94 | 35 | 129 |

== Medal summary ==
=== Medal table ===
| Sport | Gold | Silver | Bronze | Total |
|---|---|---|---|---|
| Badminton | 1 | 1 | 2 | 4 |
| Bowling | 1 | 1 | 0 | 2 |
| Body Building | 0 | 1 | 0 | 1 |
| Wushu | 0 | 1 | 0 | 1 |
| Karate | 0 | 0 | 3 | 3 |
| Sepaktakraw | 0 | 0 | 3 | 3 |
| Rowing | 0 | 0 | 2 | 2 |
| Beach volleyball | 0 | 0 | 1 | 1 |
| Sailing | 0 | 0 | 1 | 1 |
| Taekwondo | 0 | 0 | 1 | 1 |
| Weightlifting | 0 | 0 | 1 | 1 |
| Total | 2 | 4 | 14 | 20 |

=== Medalists ===
| Medal | Name | Sport | Event | Date | Ref |
|---|---|---|---|---|---|
| Gold | Ryan Leonard Lalisang | Bowling | Men's singles | 3 | |
| Gold | Taufik Hidayat | Badminton | Men's singles | 9 | |
| Silver | Putty Armein | Bowling | Women's singles | 3 | |
| Silver | Syafrizaldy | Bodybuilding | Men's 70 kg | 8 | |
| Silver | Luluk Hadiyanto; Alvent Yulianto | Badminton | Men's doubles | 9 | |
| Silver | Susyana Tjhan | Wushu | Women's changquan | 14 | |
| Bronze | Luluk Hadiyanto; Taufik Hidayat; Markis Kido; Sony Dwi Kuncoro; Simon Santoso; Hendra Setiawan; Nova Widianto; Alvent Yulianto | Badminton | Men's team | 5 | |
| Bronze | Sinta Darmariani | Weightlifting | Women's −75 kg | 5 | |
| Bronze | Abrian Sihab Aldilatama; Suko Hartono; Yudi Purnomo; Wisnu Dwi Suhantoro; Muhammad Nasrum; Triaji; Jusri Pakke; Husni Uba; Muhammad Suardi; Edy Suwarno; Nurkholis; Stephanus Sampe | Sepaktakraw | Men's team | 6 | |
| Bronze | Thomas Hallatu; Sumardi; Jamaluddin; Iswandi | Rowing | Men's Coxless Four | 7 | |
| Bronze | Pere Karoba | Rowing | Women's single sculls | 7 | |
| Bronze | Markis Kido; Hendra Setiawan | Badminton | Men's doubles | 9 | |
| Bronze | Yudi Purnomo; Muhammad Nasrum; Jusri Pakke; Husni Uba; Edy Suwarno | Sepaktakraw | Men's Regu | 10 | |
| Bronze | Amalia Kurniasih Palupi | Taekwondo | Women's +72 kg | 10 | |
| Bronze | Agus Salim; Supriadi | Beach volleyball | Men | 11 | |
| Bronze | Oka Sulaksana | Sailing | Men's Mistral Heavyweight | 11 | |
| Bronze | Jenny Zeannet Lolong | Karate | Women's kumite −53 kg | 12 | |
| Bronze | Umar Syarief | Karate | Men's kumite +80 kg | 13 | |
| Bronze | Mardiah Nasution | Karate | Women's kumite +60 kg | 13 | |
| Bronze | Yudi Purnomo; Jusri Pakke; Husni Uba | Sepaktakraw | Men's double | 13 | |

== Archery ==
Men

| Athlete | Event | Qualification | | Round of 32 | Round of 16 | Quarterfinals | Semifinals | Final/BM | |
| Athlete | Event | Score | Seed | Opposition Score | Opposition Score | Opposition Score | Opposition Score | Opposition Score | Rank |
|---|---|---|---|---|---|---|---|---|---|
| Rahmat Sulistyawan | Individual | 1289 | 9 | (34) Tun (MYA); W 89-70 | (13) Chen (TPE); W 102 (9)-102 (8) | (2) Park (KOR); W 105-100 | (14) Wakino (JPN); L 82-105 | Bronze medal match (6) Kuo (TPE); L 100-109 | 4 |

Women

| Athlete | Event | Qualification | | Round of 32 | Round of 16 | Quarterfinals | Semifinals | Final/BM | |
| Athlete | Event | Score | Seed | Opposition Score | Opposition Score | Opposition Score | Opposition Score | Opposition Score | Rank |
|---|---|---|---|---|---|---|---|---|---|
| Yasmidar Hamid | Individual | 1205 | 36 | did not advance | | | | | |
| Novia Nuraini | Individual | 1289 | 14 | (44) Tagoeva (TJK); W 101-86 | (10) Kumari (IND); W 108-98 | (1) Park (KOR); L 93-104 | did not advance | | |
| Gina Rahayu Sugiharti | Individual | 1251 | 23 | did not advance | | | | | |
| Rina Dewi Puspitasari | Individual | 1282 | 18 | (29) Santos (PHI); W 103-101 | (6) Zhao (CHN); L 100-102 | did not advance | | | |
| Yasmidar Hamid; Novia Nuraini; Gina Rahayu Sugiharti; Rina Dewi Puspitasari | Team | 3822 | 5 | | (12) Uzbekistan (UZB); W 195-161 | (4) Chinese Taipei (TPE); L 187-207 | did not advance | | |

== Badminton ==
Men
Team

| Team | Event | League stage | | | Repechage | | | Semifinal | Final | |
| Team | Event | Opposition Score | Opposition Score | Rank | Opposition Score | Opposition Score | Rank | Opposition Score | Opposition Score | Rank |
|---|---|---|---|---|---|---|---|---|---|---|
| Luluk Hadiyanto; Taufik Hidayat; Markis Kido; Sony Dwi Kuncoro; Simon Santoso; Hendra Setiawan; Nova Widianto; Alvent Yulianto | Team | India (IND); W 5–0 | China (CHN); L 1–3 | 2 R | Japan (JPN); W 5–0 | Thailand (THA); W 3–2 | 1 Q | China (CHN); L 1–3 | Did not advance | 3rd place, bronze medalist(s) |

Individual

| Athlete | Event | Round of 32 | Round of 16 | Quarterfinals | Semifinals | Final | |
| Athlete | Event | Opposition Score | Opposition Score | Opposition Score | Opposition Score | Opposition Score | Rank |
|---|---|---|---|---|---|---|---|
| (7) Taufik Hidayat | Singles | Nguyễn (VIE); W 21–18, 21–13 | Park (KOR); W 21–17, 17–21, 21–18 | (3) Bao (CHN); W 21–16, 21–14 | (2) Lee (MAS); W 21–16, 21–18 | (1) Lin (CHN); W 21–15, 22–20 | 1st place, gold medalist(s) |
| Simon Santoso | Singles | Nguyễn (VIE); W 21–16, 21–19 | (8) Ng (HKG); L 18–21, 13–21 | did not advance | | | |
| (3) Markis Kido; Hendra Setiawan | Doubles | Bye | Saputra / Wijaya (SIN); W 21–14, 21–17 | Thomas / Kumar (IND); W 18–21, 21–9, 21–11 | Koo / Tan (MAS); L 16–21, 13–21 | Did not advance | 3rd place, bronze medalist(s) |
| (5) Luluk Hadiyanto; Alvent Yulianto | Doubles | Enkhbat / Davaasüren (MGL); W 21–7, 21–6 | Leong / Lam (MAC); W 21–4, 21–7 | Guo / Zheng (CHN); W 15–21, 21–18, 21–14 | (2) Jung / Lee (KOR); W 23–25, 21–18, 21–19 | Koo / Tan (MAS); L 13–21, 14–21 | 2nd place, silver medalist(s) |

Women
Team

| Team | Event | League stage | | | Repechage | | | Semifinal | Final | |
| Team | Event | Opposition Score | Opposition Score | Rank | Opposition Score | Opposition Score | Rank | Opposition Score | Opposition Score | Rank |
|---|---|---|---|---|---|---|---|---|---|---|
| Pia Zebadiah Bernadet; Adriyanti Firdasari; Vita Marissa; Liliyana Natsir; Jo Novita; Lita Nurlita; Greysia Polii; Fransisca Ratnasari | Team | China (CHN); L 0–5 | India (IND); W 3–2 | 2 R | South Korea (KOR); L 2–3 | Hong Kong (HKG); L 0–5 | 3 | did not advance | | |

Individual

| Athlete | Event | Round of 32 | Round of 16 | Quarterfinals | Semifinals | Final | |
| Athlete | Event | Opposition Score | Opposition Score | Opposition Score | Opposition Score | Opposition Score | Rank |
|---|---|---|---|---|---|---|---|
| Fransisca Ratnasari | Singles | Jayasinghe (SRI); W 21–12, 21–13 | (1) Zhang (CHN); L 11–21, 12–21 | did not advance | | | |
| Adriyanti Firdasari | Singles | Lee (KOR); L 19–21, 14–21 | did not advance | | | | |
| (6) Pia Zebadiah Bernadet; Greysia Polii | Doubles | Bye | Maeda / Suetsuna (JPN); L 19–21, 21–12, 13–21 | did not advance | | | |
| Lita Nurlita; Vita Marissa | Doubles | Sari / Neo (SIN); W 21–12, 21–6 | (5) Thungthongkam / Chankrachangwong (THA); W 22–20, 21–12 | (2) Zhang / Yang (CHN); L 5–21, 23–21, 17–21 | did not advance | | |

Mixed

| Athlete | Event | Round of 32 | Round of 16 | Quarterfinals | Semifinals | Final | |
| Athlete | Event | Opposition Score | Opposition Score | Opposition Score | Opposition Score | Opposition Score | Rank |
|---|---|---|---|---|---|---|---|
| (1) Nova Widianto; Liliyana Natsir | Doubles | Bye | Wong / Ng (HKG); W 21–6, 21–14 | Zheng / Gao (CHN); L 19–21, 10–21 | did not advance | | |
| Alvent Yulianto; Vita Marissa | Doubles | Masuda / Yonekura (JPN); W 21–12, 21–15 | (5) Lee / Hwang (KOR); L 15–21, 17–21 | did not advance | | | |

== Beach volleyball ==
Men

| Athlete | Event | Round 1 | Round 2 | Rank 17 | Round 3 | Rank 13 | Rank 9 | Round 4 | Rank 7 | Rank 5 | Semifinals | Final/BM | |
| Athlete | Event | Opposition Score | Opposition Score | Opposition Score | Opposition Score | Opposition Score | Opposition Score | Opposition Score | Opposition Score | Opposition Score | Opposition Score | Opposition Score | Rank |
|---|---|---|---|---|---|---|---|---|---|---|---|---|---|
| Andy Ardiyansah; Koko Prasetyo Darkuncoro | Men's Team | Bye | Al-Jamani / Benlouaer (QAT); W 24-22, 21-15 | auto advancement | Wu / Xu (CHN); L 19-21, 19-21 | auto advancement | Al-Jabri / Al-Subhi (OMA); W 21-17, 22-20 | | Vorobyev / Sidorenko (KAZ); W 23-21, 21-17 | Nishimura / Watanabe (JPN); W 21-18, 21-15 | Wu / Xu (CHN); L 10-21, 21-14, 10-15 | Bronze medal match Salim / Supriadi (INA); L 23-21, 18-21, 13-15 | 4 |
| Agus Salim; Supriadi | Men's Team | Som / Koung (CAM); W 21-23, 23-21, 15-11 | Anber / Al-Kuwari (QAT); W 21-7, 21-17 | auto advancement | Asahi / Shiratori (JPN); W 25-23, 21-17 | auto advancement | auto advancement | Asahi / Shiratori (JPN); W 21-16, 21-15 | auto advancement | auto advancement | Zhou / Li (CHN); L 23-25, 21-16, 13-15 | Bronze medal match Ardiyansah / Darkuncoro (INA); W 21-23, 21-18, 15-13 | 3rd place, bronze medalist(s) |

== Bodybuilding ==
Men

| Athlete | Event | Prejudging | | Final | |
| Athlete | Event | Score | Rank | Score | Rank |
|---|---|---|---|---|---|
| Pojoh Benny Heintje | 65 kg | 57 Pts | 12 | did not advance | |
| Syafrizaldy | 70 kg | 19 Pts | 2 Q | 15 Pts (34 pts) | 2nd place, silver medalist(s) |

* Syafrizaldy originally won the bronze medal, but Sayed Faisal Husain of Bahrain the original silver medalist was disqualified after he failed the drug test.

== Bowling ==
Men

| Athlete | Event | Score | Rank |
|---|---|---|---|
| Ryan Leonard Lalisang | Singles | 1442 | 1st place, gold medalist(s) |
| Dennis Ranova Pulunggono | Singles | 1273 | 25 |
| Haqi Rumandung | Singles | 1218 | 57 |
| Hengki Susanto | Singles | 1138 | 88 |
| Edwin Lioe | Singles | 1131 | 91 |
| Rudy Goenawan | Singles | 1100 | 95 |
| Ryan Leonard Lalisang; Rudy Goenawan | Doubles | 2485 | 31 |
| Dennis Ranova Pulunggono; Edwin Lioe | Doubles | 2296 | 45 |
| Haqi Rumandung; Hengki Susanto | Doubles | 2286 | 46 |
| Edwin Lioe; Haqi Rumandung; Rudy Goenawan | Trios | 3676 | 21 |
| Dennis Ranova Pulunggono; Hengki Susanto; Ryan Leonard Lalisang | Trios | 3647 | 23 |
| Ryan Leonard Lalisang; Dennis Ranova Pulunggono; Haqi Rumandung; Hengki Susanto; Rudy Goenawan | Team of 5 | 6180 | 9 |
| Ryan Leonard Lalisang | All-events | 5289 | 5 |
| Dennis Ranova Pulunggono | All-events | 4865 | 68 |
| Haqi Rumandung | All-events | 4852 | 71 |
| Rudy Goenawan | All-events | 4709 | 79 |
| Hengki Susanto | All-events | 4695 | 82 |
| Edwin Lioe | All-events | 4572 | 90 |
| Ryan Leonard Lalisang | Masters | 3623 | 7 |

Women

| Athlete | Event | Score | Rank |
|---|---|---|---|
| Putty Armein | Singles | 1395 | 2nd place, silver medalist(s) |
| Ivana Hie | Singles | 1289 | 10 |
| Tannya Roumimper | Singles | 1281 | 13 |
| Happy Ari Dewanti Soediyono | Singles | 1267 | 17 |
| Renila Anisha Nugroho | Singles | 1223 | 25 |
| Novie Phang | Singles | 1152 | 45 |
| Tannya Roumimper; Novie Phang | Doubles | 2404 | 15 |
| Happy Ari Dewanti Soediyono; Putty Armein | Doubles | 2375 | 17 |
| Renila Anisha Nugroho; Ivana Hie | Doubles | 2204 | 27 |
| Tannya Roumimper; Happy Ari Dewanti Soediyono; Putty Armein | Trios | 3685 | 6 |
| Renila Anisha Nugroho; Novie Phang; Ivana Hie | Trios | 3412 | 17 |
| Happy Ari Dewanti Soediyono; Tannya Roumimper; Renila Anisha Nugroho; Novie Phang; Putty Armein; Ivana Hie | Team of 5 | 5908 | 6 |
| Putty Armein | All-events | 5107 | 12 |
| Happy Ari Dewanti Soediyono | All-events | 4955 | 20 |
| Tannya Roumimper | All-events | 4808 | 29 |
| Novie Phang | All-events | 4717 | 38 |
| Renila Anisha Nugroho | All-events | 4584 | 47 |
| Ivana Hie | All-events | 4560 | 51 |
| Putty Armein | Masters | 3497 | 5 |
| Happy Ari Dewanti Soediyono | Masters | 3273 | 14 |

== Canoeing ==
Men

| Athletes | Event | Heats | | Semifinal | | Final | |
| Athletes | Event | Time | Rank | Time | Rank | Time | Rank |
|---|---|---|---|---|---|---|---|
| Roinadi | Canoe Single 500 metres | 2:27.769 | 6 | Did not advance | | | |
| Asnawir | Canoe Single 1000 metres | 5:01.176 | 3 QS | 4:37.440 | 5 | Did not advance | |
| Asnawir; Roinadi | Canoe Double 500 metres | 1:57.127 | 3 QS | 1:59.460 | 4 QF | 1:49.317 | 4 |
| Asnawir; Roinadi | Canoe Double 1000 metres | 4:20.366 | 3 QS | 4:04.470 | 3 QF | 4:25.875 | 4 |
| Kuat | Kayak Single 500 metres | 2:08.343 | 3 QS | 2:07.566 | 6 | Did not advance | |
| Silo | Kayak Single 1000 metres | 4:38.787 | 5 | Did not advance | | | |
| Sayadin; Silo | Kayak Double 500 metres | 1:47.508 | 4 | Did not advance | | | |
| Kuat; Sayadin | Kayak Double 1000 metres | 3:56.417 | 3 QS | 3:43.883 | 4 | Did not advance | |

Women

| Athletes | Event | Heats | | Semifinal | | Final | |
| Athletes | Event | Time | Rank | Time | Rank | Time | Rank |
|---|---|---|---|---|---|---|---|
| Sarce Aronggear | Kayak Single 500 metres | 2:14.615 | 1 QF | | | 2:07.808 | 5 |

== Chess ==
Men

| Athlete | Event | Played | Won | Draw | Lost | Points | Rank |
|---|---|---|---|---|---|---|---|
| Susanto Megaranto | Men's Individual | 9 | 4 | 2 | 3 | 5.0 | 17 |
| Utut Adianto | Men's Individual | 9 | 3 | 2 | 4 | 4.0 | 27 |

Women

| Athlete | Event | Played | Won | Draw | Lost | Points | Rank |
|---|---|---|---|---|---|---|---|
| Irine Kharisma Sukandar | Women's Individual | 9 | 5 | 1 | 3 | 5.5 | 8 |

Mixed

| Athletes | Event | Played | Won | Draw | Lost | Points | Rank |
|---|---|---|---|---|---|---|---|
| Utut Adianto; Susanto Megaranto; Irine Kharisma Sukandar | Mixed team | 27 | 13 | 6 | 8 | 16 | 5 |

== Cue Sports ==
Men

| Athlete | Event | Round of 64 | Round of 32 | Round of 16 | Quarterfinals | Semifinals | Final | |
| Athlete | Event | Opposition Score | Opposition Score | Opposition Score | Opposition Score | Opposition Score | Opposition Score | Rank |
|---|---|---|---|---|---|---|---|---|
| Ricky Yang | 8-Ball Pool Singles | Al-Damen (JOR); W 9-0 | Au (HKG); W 9-8 | Gabica (PHI); L 5-9 | Did not advance | | | |
| Muhammad Zulfikri | 8-Ball Pool Singles | Chotipong (THA); L 8-9 | Did not advance | | | | | |
| Ricky Yang | 9-Ball Pool Singles | Battulga (MGL); W 11-1 | Lee (KOR); L 10-11 | Did not advance | | | | |
| Muhammad Zulfikri | 9-Ball Pool Singles | Chan (SIN); W 11-7 | Talwar (IND); L 10-11 | Did not advance | | | | |

== Cycling ==
=== Road ===
Men

| Athletes | Event | Final | |
| Athletes | Event | Time | Rank |
|---|---|---|---|
| Samai Amari | Individual Road Race | 4:10:54 | 24 |
| Mat Nur | Individual Road Race | --- | DNF |
| Tonton Susanto | Individual Time Trial | 1:01:12.49 | 10 |

Women

| Athletes | Event | Final | |
| Athletes | Event | Time | Rank |
|---|---|---|---|
| Uyun Muzizah | Individual Road Race | 3:07:38 | 15 |

=== Track ===
Keirin

| Athletes | Event | Round 1 Rank | Repechage Rank | Round 2 Rank | Final Rank |
|---|---|---|---|---|---|
| Edi Purnomo | Men's Keirin | 5 QR | 6 | Did not advance | |
| Samai Amari | Men's Keirin | DNS | Did not advance | | |

Pursuit

| Athletes | Event | Qualifying | | Final | |
| Athletes | Event | Time | Rank | Time | Rank |
|---|---|---|---|---|---|
| Tonton Susanto | Men's Individual pursuit | 4:50.750 | 18 | Did not advance | |
| Fatahillah Abdullah | Men's Individual pursuit | 4:55.645 | 20 | Did not advance | |
| Uyun Muzizah | Women's Individual pursuit | 3:54.006 | 7 | Did not advance | |

Omnium

| Athletes | Event | Qualifying | | | | Final | | | |
| Athletes | Event | Points | Laps | Total | Rank | Points | Laps | Total | Rank |
|---|---|---|---|---|---|---|---|---|---|
| Mat Nur | Men's points race | 1 | | 1 | 10 Q | Did not finish | | | |
| Samai Amari | Men's points race | 6 | 1 | 26 | 3 Q | Did not finish | | | |
| Fatahillah Abdullah; Kaswanto | Men's madison | | | | | Did not finish | | | |
| Uyun Muzizah | Women's points race | | | | | 7 | | 7 | 6 |

== Equestrian ==
Eventing

| Athlete | Horse | Event | Dressage | Cross-country | | | Jumping | | | Total score | Rank |
| Athlete | Horse | Event | Dressage | Jump | Time | Total | Jump | Time | Total | Total score | Rank |
|---|---|---|---|---|---|---|---|---|---|---|---|
| Asep Lesmana | Aswatama Nottage H. | Individual eventing | 70.20 | 0.00 | 17.20 | 17.20 | 16 | 2.00 | 18.00 | 105.40 | 21 |
| Dikie Mardiyanto | Aswatama R-Jay | Individual eventing | 54.50 | 0.00 | 7.60 | 7.60 | 8 | 0.00 | 8.00 | 70.10 | 9 |
| Endarjanto Bambang | Aswatama Frankie Jay | Individual eventing | 50.70 | 20 | 0.00 | 20.00 | 0 | 0.00 | 0.00 | 70.70 | 10 |
| Andry Prasetyono | Aswatama Sportzgirl | Individual eventing | 56.40 | 25 | 0.00 | 25.00 | 0 | 0.00 | EL | EL | — |
| Asep Lesmana; Dikie Mardiyanto; Endarjanto Bambang; Andry Prasetyono | Aswatama Nottage H. Aswatama R-Jay; Aswatama Frankie Jay; Aswatama Sportzgirl | Team eventing | 175.40 | 44.80 | | | 26.00 | | | 246.20 | 4 |

== Football ==
=== Men's tournament ===
Round 1

==== Group B ====
| Pos | Team | Pld | W | D | L | GF | GA | GD | Pts |
|---|---|---|---|---|---|---|---|---|---|
| 1 | Iraq | 3 | 2 | 1 | 0 | 8 | 0 | +8 | 7 |
| 2 | Syria | 3 | 1 | 2 | 0 | 4 | 1 | +3 | 5 |
| 3 | Singapore | 3 | 0 | 2 | 1 | 1 | 3 | −2 | 2 |
| 4 | Indonesia | 3 | 0 | 1 | 2 | 2 | 11 | −9 | 1 |

Source: RSSSF
18 November
18:00

| Indonesia | 0–6 | Iraq |
|---|---|---|
| | | Jassim 18'; Abid Ali 24'; Karim 36' (pen.), 63'; Mansour 82'; Rehema 89' |

Al-Ahli Stadium, Doha
Attendance: 1,300
Referee: Yang Zhiqiang (China)

21 November
16:00

| Syria | 4–1 | Indonesia |
|---|---|---|
| Al-Agha 2', 11'; Al-Sayed 17'; Al-Hamwi 87' | | Setya 50' |

Al-Ahli Stadium, Doha
Attendance: 1,000
Referee: Abdulrahman Abdou (Qatar)

24 November
18:00

| Indonesia | 1–1 | Singapore |
|---|---|---|
| Sucipto 53' | | Shariff 83' (pen.) |

Al-Wakrah Stadium, Al-Wakrah
Attendance: 1,803
Referee: Nasser Darwish (Jordan)

== Judo ==
Men

| Athlete | Event | Round of 32 | Round of 16 | Quarterfinals | Semifinals | Final | |
| Athlete | Event | Opposition Score | Opposition Score | Opposition Score | Opposition Score | Opposition Score | Rank |
|---|---|---|---|---|---|---|---|
| Peter Taslim | -66 kg | da Silva (MAC); W 1000 : 0000 | Miresmaeili (IRI); L 0000 : 1000 | Repechage −1R; Al-Hazmi (KSA); L 0010 : 1000 | Did not advance | | |
| Krisna Bayu | -90 kg | | Schwarzkopf (PHI); W 1000 : 0000 | Sobirov (TJK); L 0000 : 1000 | Repechage Final; Sayidov (UZB); L 0000 : 0202 | Did not advance | |
| Krisna Bayu | Open | | Sahatov (TKM); L 0000 : 0200 | Did not advance | | | |

== Karate ==
Legend

- KK – Forfeit (Kiken)

Men

| Athlete | Event | Round of 32 | Round of 16 | Quarterfinals | Semifinals | Final | |
| Athlete | Event | Opposition Score | Opposition Score | Opposition Score | Opposition Score | Opposition Score | Rank |
|---|---|---|---|---|---|---|---|
| Bambang Maulidin | -55 kg | | Al-Mawali (BRN); W 6 - 0 | Sarimasqov (TJK); W 3 - 1 | Ramasamy (MAS); L 0^{KK} - 8 | Bronze medal match Phạm (VIE); L 0^{KK} - 8 | 5 |
| Donny Dharmawan | -65 kg | Bye | Adwan (QAT); L 8 - 9 | Did not advance | | | |
| Christo Mondolu | -75 kg | Al-Sabsabi (SYR); W 5 - 3 | Jin (KOR); W 11 - 3 | Khalil (JOR); L 0 - 4 | Did not advance | | |
| Hendro Salim | -80 kg | Bye | Al-Abed (BRN); W 9 - 1 | Munir (KUW); L 2 - 3 | Repechage 2R; Twati (NEP); W 4 - 3 | Bronze medal match Torkzad (IRI); L 1 - 7 | 5 |
| Umar Syarief | +80 kg | | Bye | Abdullah (BRU); W 9 - 1 | Al-Hammad (KUW); L 3 - 7 | Bronze medal match Jeong (KOR); W 6 - 3 | 3rd place, bronze medalist(s) |

Women

| Athlete | Event | Round of 32 | Round of 16 | Quarterfinals | Semifinals | Final | |
| Athlete | Event | Opposition Score | Opposition Score | Opposition Score | Opposition Score | Opposition Score | Rank |
|---|---|---|---|---|---|---|---|
| Jenny Zeannet | -53 kg | | Amaral (TLS); W 7 - 0 | Viriyaphant (THA); W 7 - 1 | Araga (JPN); L 1 - 7 | Bronze medal match Shaheen (SYR); W 7 - 0 | 3rd place, bronze medalist(s) |
| Puspa Meonk | -60 kg | | Torrattanawathana (THA); L 0 - 5 | Did not advance | | | |
| Mardiah Nasution | +60 kg | | Bye | Shath (JOR); W 6 - 3 | Al-Maktoum (UAE); L 3 - 4 | Bronze medal match Abdulsayed (KUW); W 6 - 4 | 3rd place, bronze medalist(s) |

== Rowing ==
Men

| Athlete | Event | Heats | | Repechage | | Semi final | | Final | |
| Athlete | Event | Time | Rank | Time | Rank | Time | Rank | Time | Rank |
|---|---|---|---|---|---|---|---|---|---|
| Lasmin | Single Sculls | 4:14.77 | 3rd R | 3:24.88 | 1st SF A/B | Semi final A/B; 3:27.91 | 4th FB | Final B 4:18.73 | 8th |
| Thomas Hallatu; Sumardi; Jamaluddin; Iswandi | Coxless Four | 3:28.84 | 2nd SF A/B | auto advancement | | Semi final A/B; 2:52.56 | 2nd FA | Final A 3:09.83 | 3rd place, bronze medalist(s) |

Women

| Athlete | Event | Heats | | Repechage | | Semi final | | Final | |
| Athlete | Event | Time | Rank | Time | Rank | Time | Rank | Time | Rank |
|---|---|---|---|---|---|---|---|---|---|
| Pere Karoba | Single Sculls | 5:10.82 | 2nd SF A/B | auto advancement | | Semi final A/B; 3:50.31 | 2nd QF A | Final A 4:27.76 | 3rd place, bronze medalist(s) |

== Sailing ==
Men

| Athlete | Event | Race | | | | | | | | | Total | Rank |
| Athlete | Event | 1 | 2 | 3 | 4 | 5 | 6 | 7 | 8 | 9 | Total | Rank |
|---|---|---|---|---|---|---|---|---|---|---|---|---|
| Gede Subagiasa | Mistral Light | 4 | 4 | 5 | ~~(6)~~ | 4 | 4 | 5 | 5 | 6 | 37 | 5 |
| I Gusti Made Oka Sulaksana | Mistral Heavy | ~~(8)~~; OCS | 2 | 2 | 4 | 3 | 4 | 3 | 3 | 2 | 23 | 3rd place, bronze medalist(s) |

== Sepaktakraw ==
Men

| Athlete | Event | Preliminary | | | | Semifinals | Final | |
| Athlete | Event | Opposition Score | Opposition Score | Opposition Score | Opposition Score | Opposition Score | Opposition Score | Rank |
|---|---|---|---|---|---|---|---|---|
| Yudi Purnomo; Jusri Pakke; Husni Uba | Double Regu | Vietnam (VIE); W 2-0 (21-16, 21-11) | Iran (IRI); W 2-0 (21-9, 21-15) | Myanmar (MYA); L 0-2 (19-21, 21-23) | Japan (JPN); W 2-1 (16-21, 21-14, 15-12) | Thailand (THA); L 0-2 (18-21, 24-25) | Did not advance | 3rd place, bronze medalist(s) |
| Yudi Purnomo; Muhammad Nasrum; Jusri Pakke; Husni Uba; Edy Suwarno | Regu | Thailand (THA); L 0-2 (17-21, 16-21) | South Korea (KOR); W 2-0 (21-14, 23-21) | Japan (JPN); W 2-1 (21-16, 21-10) | Vietnam (VIE); W 2-0 (21-15, 21-18) | Malaysia (MAS); L 0-2 (18-21, 19-21) | Did not advance | 3rd place, bronze medalist(s) |
| Abrian Sihab Aldilatama; Suko Hartono; Yudi Purnomo; Wisnu Dwi Suhantoro; Muhammad Nasrum; Triaji; Jusri Pakke; Husni Uba; Muhammad Suardi; Edy Suwarno; Nurkholis; Stephanus Sampe | Team | South Korea (KOR); W 2-1 (2-0, 2-0, 1-2) | Thailand (THA); L 0-2 (0-2, 0-2, 0-2) | | | Malaysia (MAS); L 0-2 (0-2, 0-2, 0-2) | Did not advance | 3rd place, bronze medalist(s) |

== Taekwondo ==
Legend

- K – Won by knockout

Men

| Athlete | Event | Round of 32 | Round of 16 | Quarterfinals | Semifinals | Final | |
| Athlete | Event | Opposition Score | Opposition Score | Opposition Score | Opposition Score | Opposition Score | Rank |
|---|---|---|---|---|---|---|---|
| Muhammad Dalam Imam | -54 kg | Bye | Lizardo (PHI); L 1-2 | Did not advance | | | |
| Taufik Krisna Nugraha | -67 kg | Al-Khuffash (JOR); L 0-7 | Did not advance | | | | |
| Basuki Nugroho | -78 kg | | Hikmat (QAT); L 1-4 | Did not advance | | | |
| Rosandi | -84 kg | | Karami (IRI); L 0-2^{K} | Did not advance | | | |

Women

| Athlete | Event | Round of 32 | Round of 16 | Quarterfinals | Semifinals | Final | |
| Athlete | Event | Opposition Score | Opposition Score | Opposition Score | Opposition Score | Opposition Score | Rank |
|---|---|---|---|---|---|---|---|
| Juana Wangsa Putri | -47 kg | Pathak (IND); W 2-1 | Nezami (IRI); W 7-2 | Alora (PHI); L 0-1 | Did not advance | | |
| Amalia Kurniasih Palupi | +72 kg | | | Bye | Chen (CHN); L 0-7 | Did not advance | 3rd place, bronze medalist(s) |

== Tennis ==
Women

| Athlete | Event | Round of 32 | Round of 16 | Quarterfinals | Semifinals | Final | |
| Athlete | Event | Opposition Score | Opposition Score | Opposition Score | Opposition Score | Opposition Score | Rank |
|---|---|---|---|---|---|---|---|
| Sandy Gumulya | Singles | Chan (TPE); W 3-6, 6-1, 3-2^{r} | (1) Li (CHN); L 1-6, 3-6 | did not advance | | | |
| Romana Tedjakusuma | Singles | (6) Chan (TPE); L 2-6, 2-6 | did not advance | | | | |
| (6) Romana Tedjakusuma; Angelique Widjaja | Doubles | Bye | Saidkhodjaeva / Khabibulina (UZB); W 6-2, 6-1 | (4) Chan / Chuang (TPE); L 4-6, 4-6 | did not advance | | |
| Sandy Gumulya; Lavinia Tananta | Doubles | Al-Jazaf / Al-Felaij (KUW); W 6-0, 6-0 | (1) Zheng / Yan (CHN); L 1-6, 0-6 | did not advance | | | |
| Sandy Gumulya; Romana Tedjakusuma; Angelique Widjaja; Lavinia Tananta | Team | | Uzbekistan (UZB); L 1-2 | did not advance | | | |

== Weightlifting ==
Men

| Athlete | Event | Snatch | | Clean & jerk | | Total | Rank |
| Athlete | Event | Result | Rank | Result | Rank | Total | Rank |
|---|---|---|---|---|---|---|---|
| Eko Yuli Irawan | -56 kg | 121 kg | 5 | 150 kg | 5 | 271 kg | 6 |
| Triyatno | -62 kg | 130 kg | 6 | 161 kg | 4 | 291 kg | 4 |

Women

| Athlete | Event | Snatch | | Clean & jerk | | Total | Rank |
| Athlete | Event | Result | Rank | Result | Rank | Total | Rank |
|---|---|---|---|---|---|---|---|
| Raema Lisa Rumbewas | -53 kg | 92 kg | 3 | 115 kg | 4 | 207 kg | 4 |
| Okta Dwi Pramita | -53 kg | 85 kg | 6 | 105 kg | 7 | 190 kg | 6 |
| Sinta Darmariani | -75 kg | 100 kg | 4 | 130 kg | 3 | 230 kg | 3rd place, bronze medalist(s) |

- Sinta Darmariani originally place fourth in Women's -75 kg but Mya Sanda Oo of Myanmar who originally won the silver medal, was disqualified after she tested positive for Metabolite.

== Wushu ==
Men's Taolu

| Athlete | Event | Nanquan | Nandao | Nangun | Total | Rank |
|---|---|---|---|---|---|---|
| Heryanto | Nanquan | 9.63 | 9.58 | 9.61 | 28.82 | 5 |
| Sandry Liong | Nanquan | 9.27 | 9.40 | 9.65 | 28.32 | 12 |

Women's Taolu

| Athlete | Event | Nanquan | Nandao | Nangun | Total | Rank |
|---|---|---|---|---|---|---|
| Susyana Tjhan | Changquan | 9.38 | 9.53 | 9.65 | 28.56 | 2nd place, silver medalist(s) |
