= Taekwondo at the 2006 Asian Games – Women's 59 kg =

Taekwondo competition

Women's 59 kg at the 2006 Asian Games
- Venue: Qatar SC Indoor Hall
- Date: 10 December 2006
- Competitors: 12 from 12 nations

Medalists
gold medal	Lee Sung-hye	South Korea
silver medal	Nguyễn Thị Hoài Thu	Vietnam
bronze medal	Ayasha Shakya	Nepal
bronze medal	Tseng Pei-hua	Chinese Taipei

The women's featherweight (−59 kilograms) event at the 2006 Asian Games took place on 10 December 2006 at Qatar SC Indoor Hall, Doha, Qatar.

A total of twelve competitors from twelve countries competed in this event, limited to fighters whose body weight was less than 59 kilograms.

Lee Sung-hye from South Korea won the gold medal after beating Nguyễn Thị Hoài Thu of Vietnam in gold medal match 3–0, The bronze medal was shared by Nepalese Ayasha Shakya and Tseng Pei-hua of Chinese Taipei. Athletes from Uzbekistan, Kazakhstan, China and Philippines shared the fifth place.

The bronze medalist Tseng Pei-hua later changed her name to Tseng Li-cheng.

== Schedule ==
All times are Arabia Standard Time (UTC+03:00)

Date	Time	Event
Sunday, 10 December 2006	14:00	1/8 finals
Sunday, 10 December 2006	14:00	Quarterfinals
Sunday, 10 December 2006	14:00	Semifinals
Sunday, 10 December 2006	14:00	Final

== Results ==
1/8 finals
Nguyễn Thị Hoài Thu (VIE)	2
Marjan Tatlari (IRI)	1
Dong Fengming (CHN)	2
Watcharaporn Dongnoi (THA)	−1
Lamis Khalil (LIB)	0
Tseng Pei-hua (TPE)	7
Takhmina Khojaeva (TJK)	0
Kirstie Alora (PHI)	5

Quarterfinals
Zarina Shamshatkyzy (KAZ)	0
Nguyễn Thị Hoài Thu (VIE)	3
Dong Fengming (CHN)	0
Ayasha Shakya (NEP)	1
Dilobar Saydullaeva (UZB)	0
Tseng Pei-hua (TPE)	8
Kirstie Alora (PHI)	0
Lee Sung-hye (KOR)	4

Semifinals
Nguyễn Thị Hoài Thu (VIE)	2
Ayasha Shakya (NEP)	1
Tseng Pei-hua (TPE)	1
Lee Sung-hye (KOR)	2

Final
Nguyễn Thị Hoài Thu (VIE)	0
Lee Sung-hye (KOR)	3
