= Cue sports at the 2006 Asian Games =

- Venue: Al-Sadd Multi-Purpose Hall
- Dates: 4–11 December 2006
- Competitors: 196 from 28 nations

The cue sports of snooker, English billiards, and three-cushion carom for men, as well as eight-ball and nine-ball pool for both men and women, were contested at the 2006 Asian Games in Doha, Qatar from December 4 to December 11. All events were held at the Al-Sadd Multi-Purpose Hall.

== Schedule ==
P	Preliminary rounds	¼	Quarterfinals	½	Semifinals	F	Finals

Event↓/Date →	4th Mon			5th Tue		6th Wed		7th Thu				8th Fri			9th Sat		10th Sun	11th Mon		
Men's three-cushion singles								P		¼		¼	½	F						
Men's English billiards singles	P		¼	½	F															
Men's English billiards doubles						P	¼	½		F										
Men's eight-ball singles								P				P		¼	½	F				
Men's nine-ball singles															P		P	¼	½	F
Men's snooker singles						P		P	¼	½	F									
Men's snooker doubles	P	¼	½	F																
Men's snooker team				P	¼	½	F													
Women's eight-ball singles												P		¼	½	F				
Women's nine-ball singles															P		¼	½		F

== Medalists ==
=== Men ===
Event	Gold	Silver	Bronze
Three-cushion singles	Ryuji Umeda; Japan	Dương Anh Vũ; Vietnam	Kim Kyung-roul; South Korea
English billiards singles	Pankaj Advani; India	Ashok Shandilya; India	Peter Gilchrist; Singapore
English billiards doubles	Thailand; Praprut Chaithanasakun; Udon Khaimuk	Myanmar; Aung San Oo; Kyaw Oo	India; Geet Sethi; Ashok Shandilya
Eight-ball singles	Satoshi Kawabata; Japan	Antonio Gabica; Philippines	Huang Kun-chang; Chinese Taipei
Nine-ball singles	Antonio Gabica; Philippines	Jeff de Luna; Philippines	Yang Ching-shun; Chinese Taipei
Snooker singles	Ding Junhui; China	Liang Wenbo; China	Atthasit Mahitthi; Thailand
Snooker doubles	China; Ding Junhui; Tian Pengfei	Hong Kong; Chan Wai Ki; Marco Fu	Thailand; Atthasit Mahitthi; Phaitoon Phonbun
Snooker team	China; Liang Wenbo; Tian Pengfei; Ding Junhui	Hong Kong; Fung Kwok Wai; Marco Fu; Chan Wai Ki	India; Aditya Mehta; Yasin Merchant; Rupesh Shah

=== Women ===
Event	Gold	Silver	Bronze
Eight-ball singles	Lin Yuan-chun; Chinese Taipei	Kim Ga-young; South Korea	Pan Xiaoting; China
Nine-ball singles	Liu Shin-mei; Chinese Taipei	Esther Kwan; Malaysia	Pan Xiaoting; China

== Medal table ==
Rank	Nation	Gold	Silver	Bronze	Total
1	China (CHN)	3	1	2	6
2	Chinese Taipei (TPE)	2	0	2	4
3	Japan (JPN)	2	0	0	2
4	Philippines (PHI)	1	2	0	3
5	India (IND)	1	1	2	4
6	Thailand (THA)	1	0	2	3
7	Hong Kong (HKG)	0	2	0	2
8	South Korea (KOR)	0	1	1	2
9	Malaysia (MAS)	0	1	0	1
9	Myanmar (MYA)	0	1	0	1
9	Vietnam (VIE)	0	1	0	1
12	Singapore (SIN)	0	0	1	1
Totals (12 entries)		10	10	10	30

== Participating nations ==
A total of 196 athletes from 28 nations competed in cue sports at the 2006 Asian Games:

- Afghanistan (2)
- Bahrain (13)
- Bangladesh (5)
- Cambodia (2)
- China (7)
- Chinese Taipei (11)
- Hong Kong (5)
- India (17)
- Indonesia (2)
- Iraq (3)
- Japan (6)
- Jordan (5)
- Kuwait (11)
- Macau (3)
- Malaysia (7)
- Mongolia (10)
- Myanmar (3)
- Pakistan (12)
- Philippines (9)
- Qatar (10)
- Saudi Arabia (4)
- Singapore (9)
- South Korea (10)
- Sri Lanka (5)
- Syria (2)
- Thailand (11)
- United Arab Emirates (3)
- Vietnam (9)
