= Cue sports at the 2006 Asian Games – Men's nine-ball singles =

Men's nine-ball singles at the 2006 Asian Games
- Venue: Al-Sadd Multi-Purpose Hall
- Dates: 9–11 December 2006
- Competitors: 41 from 22 nations

Medalists
| gold medal | Antonio Gabica | Philippines |
| silver medal | Jeff de Luna | Philippines |
| bronze medal | Yang Ching-shun | Chinese Taipei |

The men's nine-ball singles tournament at the 2006 Asian Games in Doha took place from 9 December to 11 December at Al-Sadd Multi-Purpose Hall.

== Schedule ==
All times are Arabia Standard Time (UTC+03:00)

| Date | Time | Event |
|---|---|---|
| Saturday, 9 December 2006 | 10:00 | Round of 64 |
| Saturday, 9 December 2006 | 16:00 | Round of 32 |
| Sunday, 10 December 2006 | 10:00 | Round of 32 |
| Sunday, 10 December 2006 | 19:00 | Round of 16 |
| Monday, 11 December 2006 | 10:00 | Quarterfinals |
| Monday, 11 December 2006 | 13:00 | Semifinals |
| Monday, 11 December 2006 | 19:30 | Finals |

== Results ==
Legend

- WO — Won by walkover

=== Finals ===
Semifinals
1 | Yang Ching-shun (TPE) | 7
4 | Jeff de Luna (PHI) | 11
3 | Jeong Young-hwa (KOR) | 5
2 | Antonio Gabica (PHI) | 11

Gold medal match
4 | Jeff de Luna (PHI) | 7
2 | Antonio Gabica (PHI) | 11
Bronze medal match
1 | Yang Ching-shun (TPE) | 11
3 | Jeong Young-hwa (KOR) | 7

=== Top half ===
==== Section 1 ====
Round of 64
Imtaz Serwer (PAK) | 8
Firas Kamel (IRQ) | 11
Erdenesükhiin Battulga (MGL) | 1
Ricky Yang (INA) | 11

Round of 32
1 | Yang Ching-shun (TPE) | 11
Toh Lian Han (SIN) | 9
Lương Chí Dũng (VIE) | 11
Au Chi Wai (HKG) | 7
Firas Kamel (IRQ) | 11
Hamed Dhaif (BRN) | 10
Ricky Yang (INA) | 10
Lee Gun-jae (KOR) | 11

Round of 16
1 | Yang Ching-shun (TPE) | 11
Lương Chí Dũng (VIE) | 5
Firas Kamel (IRQ) | 10
Lee Gun-jae (KOR) | 11

Quarterfinals
1 | Yang Ching-shun (TPE) | 11
Lee Gun-jae (KOR) | 10

==== Section 2 ====
Round of 64
Li Hewen (CHN) | 9
Yukio Akakariyama (JPN) | 11
Ahmed Al-Sada (QAT) | 2
Ahmad Al-Mutairi (KUW) | 11

Round of 32
Patrick Ooi (MAS) | 9
Yukio Akakariyama (JPN) | 11
Zaid Thweib (JOR) | 0
Ahmad Al-Mutairi (KUW) | 11
Tepwin Arunnath (THA) | 11
Mohammed Asim (IND) | 7
Sayeem Hossain (BAN) | 2
4 | Jeff de Luna (PHI) | 11

Round of 16
Yukio Akakariyama (JPN) | 11
Ahmad Al-Mutairi (KUW) | 8
Tepwin Arunnath (THA) | 2
4 | Jeff de Luna (PHI) | 11

Quarterfinals
Yukio Akakariyama (JPN) | 10
4 | Jeff de Luna (PHI) | 11

=== Bottom half ===
==== Section 3 ====
Round of 64
Satoshi Kawabata (JPN) | WO
Shaker Wahdan (JOR)
Chan Keng Kwang (SIN) | 7
Muhammad Zulfikri (INA) | 11
Lee Chen Man (HKG) | 11
Myagmaryn Garidmagnai (MGL) | 7

Round of 32
3 | Jeong Young-hwa (KOR) | 11
Jaffer Ahmed Mohemed (SRI) | 2
Satoshi Kawabata (JPN) | 11
Yousef Al-Wadi (KSA) | 5
Muhammad Zulfikri (INA) | 10
Sumit Talwar (IND) | 11
Lee Chen Man (HKG) | 4
Wu Chia-ching (TPE) | 11

Round of 16
3 | Jeong Young-hwa (KOR) | 11
Satoshi Kawabata (JPN) | 7
Sumit Talwar (IND) | 1
Wu Chia-ching (TPE) | 11

Quarterfinals
3 | Jeong Young-hwa (KOR) | 11
Wu Chia-ching (TPE) | 9

==== Section 4 ====
Round of 64
Nguyễn Thành Nam (VIE) | 11
Ayhab Hasan (IRQ) | 5
Abdullah Al-Yousef (KUW) | 11
Mesam Ali Zaidi (PAK) | 6

Round of 32
Amnuayporn Chotipong (THA) | 11
Nguyễn Thành Nam (VIE) | 5
Xu Meng (CHN) | 11
Abdullah Al-Yousef (KUW) | 7
Bashar Hussein (QAT) | 9
Ibrahim Amir (MAS) | 11
Raed Ahmed (BRN) | 2
2 | Antonio Gabica (PHI) | 11

Round of 16
Amnuayporn Chotipong (THA) | 10
Xu Meng (CHN) | 11
Ibrahim Amir (MAS) | 5
2 | Antonio Gabica (PHI) | 11

Quarterfinals
Xu Meng (CHN) | 8
2 | Antonio Gabica (PHI) | 11
