= Cycling at the 2006 Asian Games – Men's individual pursuit =

Men's individual pursuit at the 2006 Asian Games
- Venue: Aspire Hall 1
- Date: 9–10 December 2006
- Competitors: 26 from 15 nations

Medalists
gold medal	Jang Sun-jae	South Korea
silver medal	Taiji Nishitani	Japan
bronze medal	Hwang In-hyeok	South Korea

The men's 4 km individual pursuit competition at the 2006 Asian Games was held on 9 and 10 December at the Aspire Hall 1.

== Schedule ==
All times are Arabia Standard Time (UTC+03:00)

Date	Time	Event
Saturday, 9 December 2006	12:30	Qualifying
Sunday, 10 December 2006	13:45	Finals

== Records ==
Prior to this competition, the existing world, Asian and Games records were as follows.

World Record	Chris Boardman (GBR)	4:11.114	Manchester, United Kingdom	29 August 1996
Asian Record	Yuriy Yuda (KAZ)	4:29.676	Athens, Greece	20 August 2004
Games Record	Vadim Kravchenko (KAZ)	4:35.571	Hiroshima, Japan	11 October 1994

== Results ==
Legend

- DSQ — Disqualified

=== Qualifying ===
Rank	Athlete	Time	Notes
1	Jang Sun-jae (KOR)	4:30.355	GR
2	Taiji Nishitani (JPN)	4:36.763	
3	Hwang In-hyeok (KOR)	4:37.766	
4	Mehdi Sohrabi (IRI)	4:39.265	
5	Wen Hairui (CHN)	4:39.686	
6	Wang Youguo (CHN)	4:40.788	
7	Alexey Lyalko (KAZ)	4:41.414	
8	Alireza Haghi (IRI)	4:42.882	
9	Vladimir Tuychiev (UZB)	4:43.996	
10	Huang Hsin-hua (TPE)	4:44.112	
11	Kei Uchida (JPN)	4:44.264	
12	Berik Kupeshov (KAZ)	4:44.843	
13	Nikolay Kazakbaev (UZB)	4:45.887	
14	Alfie Catalan (PHI)	4:48.275	
15	Amir Mustafa Rusli (MAS)	4:48.484	
16	Tang Wang Yip (HKG)	4:49.515	
17	Moosa Khalfan Said (QAT)	4:49.827	
18	Tonton Susanto (INA)	4:50.750	
19	Liu Chin-feng (TPE)	4:53.006	
20	Fatahillah Abdullah (INA)	4:55.645	
21	Hamad Salem Afif (QAT)	5:00.606	
22	Mansoor Jawad (BRN)	5:08.136	
23	Bader Al-Yasin (KSA)	5:16.620	
24	Mohsen Fadhel (IRQ)	5:20.480	
25	Aqeel Thamer (BRN)	5:26.065	
—	Thum Weng Kin (MAS)	DSQ	

=== Finals ===
==== Bronze ====
Rank	Athlete	Time	Notes
3rd place, bronze medalist(s)	Hwang In-hyeok (KOR)	4:38.589	
4	Mehdi Sohrabi (IRI)	4:39.525	

==== Gold ====
Rank	Athlete	Time	Notes
1st place, gold medalist(s)	Jang Sun-jae (KOR)	4:35.433	
2nd place, silver medalist(s)	Taiji Nishitani (JPN)	4:42.081	
