= Cue sports at the 2006 Asian Games – Men's eight-ball singles =

Men's eight-ball singles at the 2006 Asian Games
- Venue: Al-Sadd Multi-Purpose Hall
- Dates: 7–9 December 2006
- Competitors: 42 from 22 nations

Medalists
gold medal	Satoshi Kawabata	Japan
silver medal	Antonio Gabica	Philippines
bronze medal	Huang Kun-chang	Chinese Taipei

The men's eight-ball singles tournament at the 2006 Asian Games in Doha, Qatar took place from 7 December to 9 December at Al-Sadd Multi-Purpose Hall.

== Schedule ==
All times are Arabia Standard Time (UTC+03:00)

Date	Time	Event
Thursday, 7 December 2006	13:00	Round of 64
Thursday, 7 December 2006	13:00	Round of 32
Friday, 8 December 2006	10:00	Round of 32
Friday, 8 December 2006	13:00	Round of 16
Friday, 8 December 2006	19:00	Quarterfinals
Saturday, 9 December 2006	13:00	Semifinals
Saturday, 9 December 2006	19:30	Finals

== Results ==
=== Finals ===
Semifinals
1	Huang Kun-chang (TPE)	7
Antonio Gabica (PHI)	9
3	Leonardo Andam (PHI)	6
Satoshi Kawabata (JPN)	9

Gold medal match
Antonio Gabica (PHI)	7
Satoshi Kawabata (JPN)	9
Bronze medal match
1	Huang Kun-chang (TPE)	9
3	Leonardo Andam (PHI)	5

=== Top half ===
==== Section 1 ====
Round of 64
Xu Meng (CHN)	9
Salman Haroon (BAN)	5
Mohammed Al-Binali (QAT)	9
Ali Mohammed Abbas (BRN)	6
Tareq Al-Mulla (KUW)	7
Tepwin Arunnath (THA)	9

Round of 32
1	Huang Kun-chang (TPE)	9
Yukio Akakariyama (JPN)	3
Nguyễn Anh Tuấn (VIE)	6
Patrick Ooi (MAS)	9
Xu Meng (CHN)	9
Mohammed Al-Binali (QAT)	4
Tepwin Arunnath (THA)	9
Reenat Walem (IRQ)	2

Round of 16
1	Huang Kun-chang (TPE)	9
Patrick Ooi (MAS)	7
Xu Meng (CHN)	9
Tepwin Arunnath (THA)	4

Quarterfinals
1	Huang Kun-chang (TPE)	9
Xu Meng (CHN)	7

==== Section 2 ====
Round of 64
Au Chi Wai (HKG)	9
Rambail Gul (PAK)	2
Ashraf Al-Damen (JOR)	0
Ricky Yang (INA)	9

Round of 32
Au Chi Wai (HKG)	8
Ricky Yang (INA)	9
Antonio Gabica (PHI)	9
Baatarchuluuny Gündsambuu (MGL)	1
Nayef Al-Jawini (KSA)	7
Alok Kumar (IND)	9
Jeong Young-hwa (KOR)	9
4	Tan Tiong Boon (SIN)	5

Round of 16
Ricky Yang (INA)	5
Antonio Gabica (PHI)	9
Alok Kumar (IND)	9
Jeong Young-hwa (KOR)	5

Quarterfinals
Antonio Gabica (PHI)	9
Alok Kumar (IND)	6

=== Bottom half ===
==== Section 3 ====
Round of 64
Salman Shaikh (PAK)	9
Fahad Khalaf (BRN)	6
Muhammad Zulfikri (INA)	8
Amnuayporn Chotipong (THA)	9
Jalal Odetalah (JOR)	9
Mezaf Chowdhury (BAN)	3

Round of 32
3	Leonardo Andam (PHI)	9
Nguyễn Hoàng Lâm (VIE)	2
Ayhab Hasan (IRQ)	9
Shabbir Hazari (SRI)	3
Salman Shaikh (PAK)	0
Amnuayporn Chotipong (THA)	9
Jalal Odetalah (JOR)	9
Dharminder Lilly (IND)	7

Round of 16
3	Leonardo Andam (PHI)	9
Ayhab Hasan (IRQ)	3
Amnuayporn Chotipong (THA)	9
Jalal Odetalah (JOR)	7

Quarterfinals
3	Leonardo Andam (PHI)	9
Amnuayporn Chotipong (THA)	8

==== Section 4 ====
Round of 64
Lee Chen Man (HKG)	9
Fahad Al-Mohammedi (QAT)	5
Khaled Al-Mutairi (KUW)	6
Li Hewen (CHN)	9

Round of 32
Lee Chen Man (HKG)	9
Li Hewen (CHN)	7
Tay Choon Kiat (SIN)	6
Satoshi Kawabata (JPN)	9
Ibrahim Amir (MAS)	9
Bayasgalangiin Enkh-Amgalan (MGL)	2
Ham Won-sik (KOR)	7
2	Wu Chia-ching (TPE)	9

Round of 16
Lee Chen Man (HKG)	8
Satoshi Kawabata (JPN)	9
Ibrahim Amir (MAS)	9
2	Wu Chia-ching (TPE)	8

Quarterfinals
Satoshi Kawabata (JPN)	9
Ibrahim Amir (MAS)	3
