= Taekwondo at the 2006 Asian Games – Women's 55 kg =

Taekwondo competition

Women's 55 kg at the 2006 Asian Games
- Venue: Qatar SC Indoor Hall
- Date: 9 December 2006
- Competitors: 12 from 12 nations

Medalists
gold medal	Kim Bo-hye	South Korea
silver medal	Hoàng Hà Giang	Vietnam
bronze medal	Saule Sardarova	Kazakhstan
bronze medal	Cosette Basbous	Lebanon

The women's bantamweight (−55 kilograms) event at the 2006 Asian Games took place on 9 December 2006 at Qatar SC Indoor Hall, Doha, Qatar.

A total of twelve competitors from twelve countries competed in this event, limited to fighters whose body weight was less than 55 kilograms.

Kim Bo-hye from South Korea won the gold medal after beating Hoàng Hà Giang of Vietnam in gold medal match 2–0 after three rounds, The bronze medal was shared by Kazakh Saule Sardarova and Cosette Basbous of Lebanon, they both lost in the semifinal round to Kim Bo-hye and Hoàng Hà Giang.

Athletes from Uzbekistan, Qatar, Iran and Tajikistan shared the fifth place after losing in the quarterfinal round.

== Schedule ==
All times are Arabia Standard Time (UTC+03:00)

Date	Time	Event
Saturday, 9 December 2006	14:00	1/8 finals
Saturday, 9 December 2006	14:00	Quarterfinals
Saturday, 9 December 2006	14:00	Semifinals
Saturday, 9 December 2006	14:00	Final

== Results ==
1/8 finals
Tseng Yi-hsuan (TPE)	0
Kim Bo-hye (KOR)	3
Saule Sardarova (KAZ)	7
Gayathri Sandamali (SRI)	0
Fatma Al-Boinin (QAT)	1
Layegha Hashemi (AFG)	0
Hoàng Hà Giang (VIE)	7
Wadhehah Al-Mane (KUW)	0

Quarterfinals
Venera Abdurazakova (UZB)	0
Kim Bo-hye (KOR)	1
Saule Sardarova (KAZ)	2
Zeinab Heidari (IRI)	1
Cosette Basbous (LIB)	7
Fatma Al-Boinin (QAT)	0
Hoàng Hà Giang (VIE)	3
Ekaterina Trubitsina (TJK)	2

Semifinals
Kim Bo-hye (KOR)	3
Saule Sardarova (KAZ)	1
Cosette Basbous (LIB)	0
Hoàng Hà Giang (VIE)	2

Final
Kim Bo-hye (KOR)	2
Hoàng Hà Giang (VIE)	0
