= Rowing at the 2006 Asian Games – Men's single sculls =

Men's single sculls at the 2006 Asian Games
- Venue: West Bay Lagoon
- Date: 3–7 December 2006
- Competitors: 12 from 12 nations

Medalists
gold medal	Shin Eun-chul	South Korea
silver medal	Bajrang Lal Takhar	India
bronze medal	Mikhail Garnik	Kazakhstan

The men's single sculls competition at the 2006 Asian Games in Doha was held from 3 December to 7 December at the West Bay Lagoon.

Since Doha was scarce of water the distance had to be shortened from standard 2000 meters to 1000 meters.

== Schedule ==
All times are Arabia Standard Time (UTC+03:00)

Date	Time	Event
Sunday, 3 December 2006	15:40	Heats
Monday, 4 December 2006	15:00	Repechages
Tuesday, 5 December 2006	15:20	Semifinals
Thursday, 7 December 2006	10:10	Finals

== Results ==
=== Heats ===
- Qualification: 1–2 → Semifinals A/B (SA/B), 3–4 → Repechages (R)

==== Heat 1 ====
Rank	Athlete	Time	Notes
1	Chen Zheng (CHN)	4:08.73	SA/B
2	Kang Jin-chol (PRK)	4:19.55	SA/B
3	Bahadir Davletyarov (UZB)	4:24.47	R
4	Hamad Al-Adham (QAT)	6:04.29	R

==== Heat 2 ====
Rank	Athlete	Time	Notes
1	Mikhail Garnik (KAZ)	4:10.18	SA/B
2	Jose Rodriguez (PHI)	4:12.73	SA/B
3	Lasmin (INA)	4:14.77	R
4	Maqbool Ali (PAK)	4:32.71	R

==== Heat 3 ====
Rank	Athlete	Time	Notes
1	Shin Eun-chul (KOR)	4:05.55	SA/B
2	Bajrang Lal Takhar (IND)	4:09.64	SA/B
3	Chow Kwong Wing (HKG)	4:24.97	R
4	Raed Al-Failakawi (KUW)	5:23.71	R

=== Repechages ===
- Qualification: 1 → Semifinals A/B (SA/B), 2–3 → Final C (FC)

==== Repechage 1 ====
Rank	Athlete	Time	Notes
1	Lasmin (INA)	3:24.88	SA/B
2	Bahadir Davletyarov (UZB)	3:26.41	FC
3	Raed Al-Failakawi (KUW)	3:56.21	FC

==== Repechage 2 ====
Rank	Athlete	Time	Notes
1	Chow Kwong Wing (HKG)	3:30.81	SA/B
2	Maqbool Ali (PAK)	3:38.26	FC
3	Hamad Al-Adham (QAT)	4:32.94	FC

=== Semifinals ===
- Qualification: 1–2 → Final A (FA), 3–4 → Final B (FB)

==== Semifinal A/B 1 ====
Rank	Athlete	Time	Notes
1	Shin Eun-chul (KOR)	3:15.51	FA
2	Mikhail Garnik (KAZ)	3:20.19	FA
3	Kang Jin-chol (PRK)	3:22.70	FB
4	Lasmin (INA)	3:27.91	FB

==== Semifinal A/B 2 ====
Rank	Athlete	Time	Notes
1	Chen Zheng (CHN)	3:15.27	FA
2	Bajrang Lal Takhar (IND)	3:20.11	FA
3	Chow Kwong Wing (HKG)	3:24.88	FB
4	Jose Rodriguez (PHI)	3:25.90	FB

=== Finals ===
==== Final C ====
Rank	Athlete	Time
1	Bahadir Davletyraov (UZB)	4:00.50
2	Maqbool Ali (PAK)	4:12.70
3	Raed Al-Failakawi (KUW)	4:39.85
4	Hamad Al-Adham (QAT)	4:50.60

==== Final B ====
Rank	Athlete	Time
1	Kang Jin-chol (PRK)	3:56.23
2	Chow Kwong Wing (HKG)	3:58.62
3	Jose Rodriguez (PHI)	4:00.29
4	Lasmin (INA)	4:18.73

==== Final A ====
Rank	Athlete	Time
1st place, gold medalist(s)	Shin Eun-chul (KOR)	3:38.04
2nd place, silver medalist(s)	Bajrang Lal Takhar (IND)	3:39.43
3rd place, bronze medalist(s)	Mikhail Garnik (KAZ)	3:44.58
4	Chen Zheng (CHN)	3:45.62
