= Canoeing at the 2006 Asian Games – Men's C-1 1000 metres =

Men's C-1 1000 metres at the 2006 Asian Games
- Venue: West Bay Lagoon
- Date: 10–11 December 2006
- Competitors: 10 from 10 nations

Medalists
gold medal	Vadim Menkov	Uzbekistan
silver medal	Yevgeniy Bezhnar	Kazakhstan
bronze medal	Taito Ambo	Japan

The men's C-1 1000 metres sprint canoeing competition at the 2006 Asian Games in Doha was held on 10 and 11 December at the West Bay Lagoon.

== Schedule ==
All times are Arabia Standard Time (UTC+03:00)

Date	Time	Event
Sunday, 10 December 2006	09:30	Heats
Sunday, 10 December 2006	14:10	Semifinal
Monday, 11 December 2006	14:10	Final

== Results ==
=== Heats ===
- Qualification: 1 → Final (QF), 2–4 → Semifinal (QS)

==== Heat 1 ====
Rank	Athlete	Time	Notes
1	Vadim Menkov (UZB)	4:47.869	QF
2	Taito Ambo (JPN)	4:50.524	QS
3	Asnawir (INA)	5:01.176	QS
4	Nguyễn Đức Cảnh (VIE)	5:09.173	QS
5	Dany Funelas (PHI)	5:21.952	

==== Heat 2 ====
Rank	Athlete	Time	Notes
1	Yang Wenjun (CHN)	4:46.345	QF
2	Yevgeniy Bezhnar (KAZ)	4:49.829	QS
3	An Hyun-jin (KOR)	4:56.385	QS
4	Shahoo Nasseri (IRI)	4:57.421	QS
5	Amarjeet Singh (IND)	4:58.157	

=== Semifinal ===
- Qualification: 1–4 → Final (QF)

Rank	Athlete	Time	Notes
1	Shahoo Nasseri (IRI)	4:31.468	QF
2	Yevgeniy Bezhnar (KAZ)	4:32.612	QF
3	Taito Ambo (JPN)	4:33.404	QF
4	An Hyun-jin (KOR)	4:36.972	QF
5	Asnawir (INA)	4:37.440	
6	Nguyễn Đức Cảnh (VIE)	4:38.544	

=== Final ===
Rank	Athlete	Time
1st place, gold medalist(s)	Vadim Menkov (UZB)	4:57.815
2nd place, silver medalist(s)	Yevgeniy Bezhnar (KAZ)	4:58.571
3rd place, bronze medalist(s)	Taito Ambo (JPN)	5:08.883
4	An Hyun-jin (KOR)	5:11.799
5	Yang Wenjun (CHN)	5:20.247
6	Shahoo Nasseri (IRI)	5:57.471
