= Taekwondo at the 2006 Asian Games – Men's 54 kg =

Taekwondo competition

Men's 54 kg at the 2006 Asian Games
- Venue: Qatar SC Indoor Hall
- Date: 7 December 2006
- Competitors: 24 from 24 nations

Medalists
gold medal	Mohammad Al-Bakhit	Jordan
silver medal	Vasavat Somswang	Thailand
bronze medal	Renat Kuralbayev	Kazakhstan
bronze medal	Abdulrahim Abdulhameed	Bahrain

The men's finweight (−54 kilograms) event at the 2006 Asian Games took place on 7 December 2006 at Qatar SC Indoor Hall, Doha, Qatar.

== Schedule ==
All times are Arabia Standard Time (UTC+03:00)

Date	Time	Event
Thursday, 7 December 2006	14:00	1/16 finals
Thursday, 7 December 2006	14:00	1/8 finals
Thursday, 7 December 2006	14:00	Quarterfinals
Thursday, 7 December 2006	14:00	Semifinals
Thursday, 7 December 2006	14:00	Final

== Results ==
=== Final ===
Final
Vasavat Somswang (THA)	0
Mohammad Al-Bakhit (JOR)	1

=== Top half ===
1/16 finals
Adli Ghanem (YEM)	1
Maree Thabaya (PLE)	0
Azamat Ergeshov (KGZ)	3
Fredinal Soares (TLS)	0
Cheong Ngai Hou (MAC)	1
Habib Zarife (LIB)	5
Tandin Dendup (BHU)	−1
Kumar Manandhar (NEP)	5

1/8 finals
Renat Kuralbayev (KAZ)	8
Adli Ghanem (YEM)	5
Azamat Ergeshov (KGZ)	−1
Chen Wei-chang (TPE)	4
Naskhidin Vorisov (TJK)	4
Habib Zarife (LIB)	2
Kumar Manandhar (NEP)	1
Vasavat Somswang (THA)	5

Quarterfinals
Renat Kuralbayev (KAZ)	−1
Chen Wei-chang (TPE)	−2
Naskhidin Vorisov (TJK)	2
Vasavat Somswang (THA)	3

Semifinals
Renat Kuralbayev (KAZ)	0
Vasavat Somswang (THA)	4

=== Bottom half ===
1/16 finals
Malik Shahzad Ahmed (PAK)	1
Thongkanh Vongphakdy (LAO)	0
Wahid Bin Azim (BAN)	0
Japoy Lizardo (PHI)	7
Evgeniy Tsoy (UZB)	3
Mohammad Al-Bakhit (JOR)	7
Mamdoh Al-Mowalad (KSA)	3
Sulaiman Al-Rasheidi (KUW)	4

1/8 finals
Abdulrahim Abdulhameed (BRN)	2
Malik Shahzad Ahmed (PAK)	0
Japoy Lizardo (PHI)	2
Muhammad Dalam Imam (INA)	1
Ali Abdulla (QAT)	−1
Mohammad Al-Bakhit (JOR)	5
Sulaiman Al-Rasheidi (KUW)	2
Nguyễn Hữu Nhân (VIE)	3

Quarterfinals
Abdulrahim Abdulhameed (BRN)	3
Japoy Lizardo (PHI)	1
Mohammad Al-Bakhit (JOR)	5
Nguyễn Hữu Nhân (VIE)	2

Semifinals
Abdulrahim Abdulhameed (BRN)	−1
Mohammad Al-Bakhit (JOR)	1
