= Taekwondo at the 2006 Asian Games – Men's 78 kg =

Taekwondo competition

Men's 78 kg at the 2006 Asian Games
- Venue: Qatar SC Indoor Hall
- Date: 8 December 2006
- Competitors: 16 from 16 nations

Medalists
gold medal	Abdulqader Hikmat	Qatar
silver medal	Mehdi Bibak	Iran
bronze medal	Liao Chia-hsing	Chinese Taipei
bronze medal	Deepak Bista	Nepal

The men's welterweight (−78 kilograms) taekwondo event at the 2006 Asian Games took place on 8 December 2006 at Qatar SC Indoor Hall, Doha, Qatar.

A total of sixteen competitors from sixteen countries competed in this event, limited to fighters whose body weight was less than 78 kilograms.

Abdulqader Hikmat Sarhan of Qatar won his country's first ever Asian Games taekwondo gold medal after beating 1998 Asian Games gold medalist Mehdi Bibak of Iran in a controversial final 8–5. Bibak claimed he was cheated by the officials and he had so much more valid kicks than his Qatari opponent.

Liao Chia-hsing of Chinese Taipei and Deepak Bista from Nepal lost in semifinal and won the bronze medal.

== Schedule ==
All times are Arabia Standard Time (UTC+03:00)

Date	Time	Event
Friday, 8 December 2006	14:00	1/8 finals
Friday, 8 December 2006	14:00	Quarterfinals
Friday, 8 December 2006	14:00	Semifinals
Friday, 8 December 2006	14:00	Final

== Results ==
1/8 finals
Mehdi Bibak (IRI)	11
Georgiy Chernov (UZB)	7
Sonam Penjor (BHU)	0
Moataz Akkam (SYR)	7
Ali Al-Mutawa (BRN)	2
Pan Dongdong (CHN)	1
Liao Chia-hsing (TPE)	6
Ernesto Juan Mendoza (PHI)	1
Yahya Al-Ahdal (YEM)	2
Bader Al-Enezi (KUW)	9
Deepak Bista (NEP)	3
Ahmed Mabrouk (PLE)	1
Basuki Nugroho (INA)	1
Abdulqader Hikmat (QAT)	4
Mohammad Ahangarzada (AFG)	1
Yasser Al-Harbi (KSA)	3

Quarterfinals
Mehdi Bibak (IRI)	10
Moataz Akkam (SYR)	8
Ali Al-Mutawa (BRN)	1
Liao Chia-hsing (TPE)	2
Bader Al-Enezi (KUW)	2
Deepak Bista (NEP)	3
Abdulqader Hikmat (QAT)	2
Yasser Al-Harbi (KSA)	1

Semifinals
Mehdi Bibak (IRI)	1
Liao Chia-hsing (TPE)	0
Deepak Bista (NEP)	1
Abdulqader Hikmat (QAT)	8

Final
Mehdi Bibak (IRI)	5
Abdulqader Hikmat (QAT)	8
