= Taekwondo at the 2006 Asian Games – Women's 63 kg =

Taekwondo competition

Women's 63 kg at the 2006 Asian Games
- Venue: Qatar SC Indoor Hall
- Date: 7 December 2006
- Competitors: 10 from 10 nations

Medalists
gold medal	Su Li-wen	Chinese Taipei
silver medal	Chonnapas Premwaew	Thailand
bronze medal	Veronica Domingo	Philippines
bronze medal	Manita Shahi	Nepal

The women's lightweight (−63 kilograms) taekwondo event at the 2006 Asian Games took place on 7 December 2006 at Qatar SC Indoor Hall, Doha, Qatar.

A total of ten competitors from ten different countries (NOCs) competed in this event, limited to fighters whose body weight was less than 63 kilograms.

Su Li-wen of Chinese Taipei won the gold medal after beating Chonnapas Premwaew of Thailand in the gold medal match 1–0, The bronze medal was shared by Manita Shahi of Nepal and Veronica Domingo from the Philippines.

The silver medalist Chonnapas Premwaew later changed her name to Dhunyanun Premwaew. She beat the Korean favorite Jin Chae-lin in the quarterfinal round 2–0.

== Schedule ==
All times are Arabia Standard Time (UTC+03:00)

Date	Time	Event
Thursday, 7 December 2006	14:00	1/8 finals
Thursday, 7 December 2006	14:00	Quarterfinals
Thursday, 7 December 2006	14:00	Semifinals
Thursday, 7 December 2006	14:00	Final

== Results ==
1/8 finals
Jin Chae-lin (KOR)	4
Yekaterina Dmitriyeva (KAZ)	1
Varsha Bende (IND)	0
Manita Shahi (NEP)	1

Quarterfinals
Chonnapas Premwaew (THA)	2
Jin Chae-lin (KOR)	0
Veronica Domingo (PHI)	5
Carina Hammoud (LIB)	1
Shaden Thweib (JOR)	0
Su Li-wen (TPE)	3
Manita Shahi (NEP)	3
Sangay Wangmo (BHU)	2

Semifinals
Chonnapas Premwaew (THA)	7
Veronica Domingo (PHI)	0
Su Li-wen (TPE)	8
Manita Shahi (NEP)	1

Final
Chonnapas Premwaew (THA)	0
Su Li-wen (TPE)	1
