= Sailing at the 2006 Asian Games – Men's Mistral heavy =

Men's Mistral heavy at the 2006 Asian Games
- Venue: Doha Sailing Club
- Date: 5–11 December 2006
- Competitors: 7 from 7 nations

Medalists
gold medal	Yao Xinhao	China
silver medal	Ho Chi Ho	Hong Kong
bronze medal	Oka Sulaksana	Indonesia

The men's Mistral heavy competition at the 2006 Asian Games in Doha was held from 5 to 11 December 2006.

== Schedule ==
All times are Arabia Standard Time (UTC+03:00)

Date	Time	Event
Tuesday, 5 December 2006	11:00	Race 1
Tuesday, 5 December 2006	11:00	Race 2
Wednesday, 6 December 2006	11:00	Race 3
Thursday, 7 December 2006	11:00	Race 4
Thursday, 7 December 2006	11:00	Race 5
Friday, 8 December 2006	11:00	Race 6
Friday, 8 December 2006	11:00	Race 7
Monday, 11 December 2006	11:00	Race 8
Monday, 11 December 2006	11:00	Race 9

== Results ==
Legend

- OCS — On course side

Rank	Athlete	Race									Total
Rank	Athlete	1	2	3	4	5	6	7	8	9	Total
1st place, gold medalist(s)	Yao Xinhao (CHN)	2	1	1	2	2	1	1	2	~~(3)~~	12
2nd place, silver medalist(s)	Ho Chi Ho (HKG)	1	~~(4)~~	4	1	1	2	2	4	1	16
3rd place, bronze medalist(s)	Oka Sulaksana (INA)	~~(8)~~; OCS	2	2	4	3	4	3	3	2	23
4	Phanuthat Ruamsap (THA)	4	3	~~(5)~~	3	4	3	4	1	4	26
5	Moon Chang-sung (KOR)	3	~~(5)~~	3	5	5	5	5	5	5	36
6	Reneric Moreno (PHI)	5	~~(6)~~	6	6	6	6	6	6	6	47
7	Priyantha Gunawardene (SRI)	6	~~(7)~~	7	7	7	7	7	7	7	55
