= You Young-dae =

South Korean taekwondo practitioner

- Nationality: South Korean; Taiwanese
- Division: flyweight
- Style: Taekwondo

You Young-dae is a South Korean taekwondo practitioner.

You won the flyweight gold medal at the 2006 Asian Taekwondo Championships, and earned another gold medal within the same weight class at the 2006 Asian Games. He later moved to Taiwan and trained the Chinese Taipei women's taekwondo team from 2013 to 2019, during the 2014 and 2018 Asian Games. You naturalized as a citizen of the Republic of China in April 2020 without yielding his South Korean citizenship, due to a provision in Taiwanese nationality law for high-level professionals to obtain dual nationality through naturalization.
