= Karate at the 2006 Asian Games – Men's kumite +80 kg =

Karate competition

Men's kumite +80 kg at the 2006 Asian Games
- Venue: Qatar SC Indoor Hall
- Date: 13 December 2006
- Competitors: 10 from 10 nations

Medalists
gold medal	Khalid Khalidov	Kazakhstan
silver medal	Jaber Al-Hammad	Kuwait
bronze medal	Amer Abu Afifeh	Jordan
bronze medal	Umar Syarief	Indonesia

The men's kumite +80 kilograms competition at the 2006 Asian Games in Qatar SC Indoor Hall, Doha, Qatar was held on 13 December 2006 at the Qatar SC Indoor Hall.

A total of ten competitors from ten countries competed in this event, limited to fighters whose body weight was more than 80 kilograms.

Khalid Khalidov of Kazakhstan won the gold medal, he beat Jaber Al-Hammad from Kuwait in the final, Amer Abu Afifeh of Jordan and Umar Syarief of Indonesia won the bronze medal.

== Schedule ==
All times are Arabia Standard Time (UTC+03:00)

Date	Time	Event
Wednesday, 13 December 2006	13:00	1/8 finals
Wednesday, 13 December 2006	13:00	Quarterfinals
Wednesday, 13 December 2006	13:00	Semifinals
Wednesday, 13 December 2006	13:00	Finals

== Results ==
Legend

- K — Won by kiken (8–0)

1/8 finals
Mahmoud Dalloul (QAT)
Shadi Al-Ali (SYR)	K
Jaber Jassim (UAE)	2
Jeong Kwon-hong (KOR)	5

Quarterfinals
Mohammed Al-Khateeb (PLE)	0
Amer Abu Afifeh (JOR)	2
Shadi Al-Ali (SYR)	1
Khalid Khalidov (KAZ)	9
Jaber Al-Hammad (KUW)	6
Jeong Kwon-hong (KOR)	2
Umar Syarief (INA)	9
Md Sofian Abdullah (BRU)	1

Semifinals
Amer Abu Afifeh (JOR)	3
Khalid Khalidov (KAZ)	11
Jaber Al-Hammad (KUW)	7
Umar Syarief (INA)	3

Final
Khalid Khalidov (KAZ)	10
Jaber Al-Hammad (KUW)	2

=== Repechage ===
Final repechage
Amer Abu Afifeh (JOR)	11
Shadi Al-Ali (SYR)	8
Jeong Kwon-hong (KOR)	3
Umar Syarief (INA)	6
