= Taekwondo at the 2006 Asian Games – Men's 58 kg =

Taekwondo competition

Men's 58 kg at the 2006 Asian Games
- Venue: Qatar SC Indoor Hall
- Date: 8 December 2006
- Competitors: 26 from 26 nations

Medalists
gold medal	You Young-dae	South Korea
silver medal	Nattapong Tewawetchapong	Thailand
bronze medal	Chu Mu-yen	Chinese Taipei
bronze medal	Behzad Khodadad	Iran

The men's flyweight (−58 kilograms) event at the 2006 Asian Games took place on 8 December 2006 at Qatar SC Indoor Hall, Doha, Qatar.

== Schedule ==
All times are Arabia Standard Time (UTC+03:00)

Date	Time	Event
Friday, 8 December 2006	14:00	1/16 finals
Friday, 8 December 2006	14:00	1/8 finals
Friday, 8 December 2006	14:00	Quarterfinals
Friday, 8 December 2006	14:00	Semifinals
Friday, 8 December 2006	14:00	Final

== Results ==
Legend

- DQ — Won by disqualification

=== Final ===
Final
Nattapong Tewawetchapong (THA)	−1
You Young-dae (KOR)	1

=== Top half ===
1/16 finals
Ali Al-Jahrabi (YEM)	1
Rohullah Nikpai (AFG)	5
Faheem Jawad Butt (PAK)	3
Yam Bahadur Pun Magar (NEP)	1
Faris Al-Assaf (JOR)	2
Phouthavong Outhasak (LAO)	1
Matin Boboev (TJK)	1
Bader Yusif (BRN)	1
Kinley Rabgay (BHU)	DQ
Ahmed Matar (PLE)	DQ

1/8 finals
Nattapong Tewawetchapong (THA)	2
Rohullah Nikpai (AFG)	0
Faheem Jawad Butt (PAK)	0
Faris Al-Assaf (JOR)	5
Chu Mu-yen (TPE)	4
Bader Yusif (BRN)	1
Bye
Lê Huỳnh Châu (VIE)

Quarterfinals
Nattapong Tewawetchapong (THA)	2
Faris Al-Assaf (JOR)	0
Chu Mu-yen (TPE)	3
Lê Huỳnh Châu (VIE)	2

Semifinals
Nattapong Tewawetchapong (THA)	2
Chu Mu-yen (TPE)	1

=== Bottom half ===
1/16 finals
Naser Al-Hurais (KUW)	3
Abdul Mobeen Khan (IND)	2
Samer Chaaya (LIB)	2
Behzad Khodadad (IRI)	5
Sugath Weraduwage (SRI)	DQ
Enkhbatyn Itgel (MGL)
Batyrbek Yestavletov (KAZ)	6
Yusupdjan Abdumaminov (KGZ)	1
You Young-dae (KOR)	7
Awal Verdial (TLS)	0

1/8 finals
Imad Al-Matrafi (KSA)	2
Naser Al-Hurais (KUW)	7
Behzad Khodadad (IRI)	6
Luis Gomes (MAC)	0
Sugath Weraduwage (SRI)	0
Batyrbek Yestavletov (KAZ)	8
You Young-dae (KOR)	3
Ibrahim Saad (QAT)	−1

Quarterfinals
Naser Al-Hurais (KUW)	2
Behzad Khodadad (IRI)	8
Batyrbek Yestavletov (KAZ)	2
You Young-dae (KOR)	3

Semifinals
Behzad Khodadad (IRI)	7
You Young-dae (KOR)	8
