= Weightlifting at the 2006 Asian Games – Women's 75 kg =

Women's 75 kg at the 2006 Asian Games
- Venue: Al-Dana Banquet Hall
- Date: 5 December 2006
- Competitors: 8 from 8 nations

Medalists
| gold medal | Cao Lei | China |
| silver medal | Kim Soon-hee | South Korea |
| bronze medal | Sinta Darmariani | Indonesia |

The women's 75 kilograms event at the 2006 Asian Games took place on December 5, 2006 at Al-Dana Banquet Hall in Doha.

== Schedule ==
All times are Arabia Standard Time (UTC+03:00)

| Date | Time | Event |
|---|---|---|
| Tuesday, 5 December 2006 | 13:00 | Group A |

== Records ==
Prior to this competition, the existing world, Asian and Games records were as follows.

| World Record | Snatch | Natalya Zabolotnaya (RUS) | 130 kg | Doha, Qatar | 13 November 2005 |
| World Record | Clean & Jerk | Liu Chunhong (CHN) | 159 kg | Doha, Qatar | 13 November 2005 |
| World Record | Total | Svetlana Podobedova (RUS) | 286 kg | Hangzhou, China | 2 June 2006 |
| Asian Record | Snatch | Liu Chunhong (CHN) | 126 kg | Doha, Qatar | 13 November 2005 |
| Asian Record | Clean & Jerk | Liu Chunhong (CHN) | 159 kg | Doha, Qatar | 13 November 2005 |
| Asian Record | Total | Liu Chunhong (CHN) | 285 kg | Doha, Qatar | 13 November 2005 |
| Games Record | Snatch | Sun Ruiping (CHN) | 118 kg | Busan, South Korea | 7 October 2002 |
| Games Record | Clean & Jerk | Sun Ruiping (CHN) | 152 kg | Busan, South Korea | 7 October 2002 |
| Games Record | Total | Sun Ruiping (CHN) | 270 kg | Busan, South Korea | 7 October 2002 |

== Results ==
Legend

- NM — No mark

| Rank | Athlete | Group | Body weight | Snatch (kg) | | | | Clean & Jerk (kg) | | | | Total |
| Rank | Athlete | Group | Body weight | 1 | 2 | 3 | Result | 1 | 2 | 3 | Result | Total |
|---|---|---|---|---|---|---|---|---|---|---|---|---|
| 1st place, gold medalist(s) | Cao Lei (CHN) | A | 73.23 | 110 | 115 | 120 | 120 | 141 | 147 | 152 | 152 | 272 |
| 2nd place, silver medalist(s) | Kim Soon-hee (KOR) | A | 74.93 | 105 | 108 | 110 | 110 | 133 | 136 | ~~141~~ | 136 | 246 |
| 3rd place, bronze medalist(s) | Sinta Darmariani (INA) | A | 73.24 | 100 | ~~104~~ | ~~104~~ | 100 | 130 | ~~140~~ | ~~140~~ | 130 | 230 |
| 4 | Irina Vlassova (KAZ) | A | 74.93 | 96 | 101 | ~~105~~ | 101 | ~~125~~ | 125 | ~~128~~ | 125 | 226 |
| 5 | Yang Houqin (MAC) | A | 74.64 | 100 | ~~105~~ | ~~105~~ | 100 | 125 | ~~130~~ | ~~130~~ | 125 | 225 |
| 6 | Nguyễn Thị Phương Loan (VIE) | A | 72.83 | ~~95~~ | ~~95~~ | 95 | 95 | 123 | 126 | ~~130~~ | 126 | 221 |
| 7 | Kazue Imahoko (JPN) | A | 74.71 | 95 | 100 | ~~105~~ | 100 | 118 | ~~123~~ | ~~124~~ | 118 | 218 |
| DQ | Mya Sanda Oo (MYA) | A | 74.82 | 100 | 105 | 110 | 110 | 131 | 135 | 140 | 140 | ~~250~~ |

- Mya Sanda Oo of Myanmar originally won the silver medal, but was disqualified after she tested positive for Metabolite.

== New records ==
The following records were established during the competition.

| Snatch | 120 | Cao Lei (CHN) | GR |
| Total | 272 | Cao Lei (CHN) | GR |
