= Nguyễn Thị Hoài Thu =

Vietnamese taekwondo practitioner

Nguyen Thi Hoai Thu
Personal information
- Nationality: Vietnam
- Born: 7 January 1985 (age 41) Hanoi, Vietnam
- Height: 1.67 m (5 ft 5 1/2 in)
- Weight: 57 kg (126 lb)

Sport
- Sport: Taekwondo
- Event: 57 kg
Medal record
Women's taekwondo
Representing Vietnam
Asian Games
Silver medal – second place	2006 Doha	57 kg
Silver medal – second place	2010 Guangzhou	57 kg
Southeast Asian Games
Gold medal – first place	2007 Bangkok	59 kg
Gold medal – first place	2009 Vientiane	57 kg
Bronze medal – third place	2005 Manila	59 kg

Nguyễn Thị Hoài Thu (January 7, 1985) is a Vietnamese taekwondo practitioner. She is a three-time medalist (two golds and one bronze) for the women's featherweight division at the Southeast Asian Games. She also captured two silver medals in the 53 and 59 kg classes at the 2006 Asian Games in Doha, Qatar, and at the 2010 Asian Games in Guangzhou, China, losing out to South Korea's Lee Sung-Hye and Thailand's Sarita Phongsri, respectively.

Nguyen qualified for the women's 57 kg class at the 2008 Summer Olympics in Beijing. After placing second from the Asian Qualification Tournament in Ho Chi Minh City, Vietnam. She lost the first preliminary round match to Senegal's Bineta Diedhiou, with a sudden death score of 0–1.
