= Canoeing at the 2006 Asian Games – Men's C-2 1000 metres =

Men's C-2 1000 metres at the 2006 Asian Games
- Venue: West Bay Lagoon
- Date: 10–11 December 2006
- Competitors: 16 from 8 nations

Medalists
gold medal	Ma Xiaojie; Huang Shaokun	China
silver medal	Gerasim Kochnev; Serik Mirbekov	Uzbekistan
bronze medal	Taito Ambo; Kosuke Fujii	Japan

The men's C-2 1000 metres sprint canoeing competition at the 2006 Asian Games in Doha was held on 10 and 11 December at the West Bay Lagoon.

== Schedule ==
All times are Arabia Standard Time (UTC+03:00)

Date	Time	Event
Sunday, 10 December 2006	10:20	Heats
Sunday, 10 December 2006	14:30	Semifinal
Monday, 11 December 2006	14:50	Final

== Results ==
=== Heats ===
- Qualification: 1 → Final (QF), Rest → Semifinal (QS)

==== Heat 1 ====
Rank	Athlete	Time	Notes
1	Japan (JPN); Taito Ambo; Kosuke Fujii	4:18.451	QF
2	Iran (IRI); Omid Khoshkhoo; Sirvan Ahmadi	4:34.671	QS
3	Kazakhstan (KAZ); Kaisar Nurmaganbetov; Alexandr Dyadchuk	4:44.207	QS
4	India (IND); Sawlabow; M. Sanjit Singh	4:47.359	QS

==== Heat 2 ====
Rank	Athlete	Time	Notes
1	Uzbekistan (UZB); Gerasim Kochnev; Serik Mirbekov	4:16.938	QF
2	China (CHN); Ma Xiaojie; Huang Shaokun	4:18.482	QS
3	Indonesia (INA); Asnawir; Roinadi	4:20.366	QS
4	Vietnam (VIE); Hoàng Hồng Anh; Trần Văn Long	4:37.762	QS

=== Semifinal ===
- Qualification: 1–4 → Final (QF)

Rank	Athlete	Time	Notes
1	Vietnam (VIE); Hoàng Hồng Anh; Trần Văn Long	4:03.178	QF
2	Kazakhstan (KAZ); Kaisar Nurmaganbetov; Alexandr Dyadchuk	4:03.746	QF
3	Indonesia (INA); Asnawir; Roinadi	4:04.470	QF
4	China (CHN); Ma Xiaojie; Huang Shaokun	4:04.830	QF
5	Iran (IRI); Omid Khoshkhoo; Sirvan Ahmadi	4:06.354	
6	India (IND); Sawlabow; M. Sanjit Singh	4:45.238	

=== Final ===
Rank	Team	Time
1st place, gold medalist(s)	China (CHN); Ma Xiaojie; Huang Shaokun	4:22.003
2nd place, silver medalist(s)	Uzbekistan (UZB); Gerasim Kochnev; Serik Mirbekov	4:25.511
3rd place, bronze medalist(s)	Japan (JPN); Taito Ambo; Kosuke Fujii	4:25.863
4	Indonesia (INA); Asnawir; Roinadi	4:25.875
5	Vietnam (VIE); Hoàng Hồng Anh; Trần Văn Long	4:50.331
6	Kazakhstan (KAZ); Kaisar Nurmaganbetov; Alexandr Dyadchuk	5:04.471
