= Dhunyanun Premwaew =

Thai taekwondo practitioner

Medal record

Women's taekwondo

Representing Thailand

World Championships
Bronze medal – third place	2005 Madrid	62 kg
Bronze medal – third place	2009 Copenhagen	63 kg

Asian Games
Silver medal – second place	2002 Busan	55 kg
Silver medal – second place	2006 Doha	63 kg

Asian Championships
Silver medal – second place	2006 Bangkok	59 kg
Silver medal – second place	2010 Astana	62 kg
Bronze medal – third place	2002 Amman	55 kg

Southeast Asian Games
Gold medal – first place	2005 Manila	67 kg
Gold medal – first place	2007 Nakhon Ratchasima	63 kg
Gold medal – first place	2011 Jakarta-Palembang	67 kg
Bronze medal – third place	2009 Vientiane	63 kg

Universiade
Silver medal – second place	2007 Bangkok	59 kg
Silver medal – second place	2009 Belgrade	63 kg

Asian Junior Championships
Bronze medal – third place	2001 Chang Hua	52 kg

Dhunyanun Premwaew (Thai: ชลนภัส เปรมแหวว; born July 20, 1987), formerly Chonnapas Premwaew, is a Thai taekwondo practitioner.
