= Kim Bo-hye =

South Korean taekwondo practitioner

Personal information
- Nationality: South Korean

Sport
- Sport: Taekwondo
Medal record
Representing South Korea
Women's taekwondo
World Championships
Gold medal – first place	2005 Madrid	Bantamweight
Asian Games
Gold medal – first place	2006 Doha	Bantamweight

Kim Bo-hye is a South Korean taekwondo practitioner.

She won a gold medal in bantamweight at the 2005 World Taekwondo Championships in Madrid. She won a gold medal at the 2006 Asian Games.
