= Abdulqader Hikmat =

Qatari taekwondo practitioner

Personal information
- Full name: Abdulqader Hikmat Sarhan
- Born: 19 August 1987 (age 39)
- Height: 180 cm (5 ft 11 in)
- Weight: 80 kg (176 lb)
Medal record
Men's taekwondo
Representing Qatar
Asian Games
Gold medal – first place	2006 Doha	Welterweight

Abdulqader Hikmat Sarhan (Arabic: عبد القادر حكمت سرحان, born 19 August 1987) is a male Qatari Taekwondo practitioner. He won the gold medal in the welterweight category (-78 kg) at the 2006 Asian Games, and competed at the 2008 Summer Olympics.
