= Hoàng Hà Giang =

Vietnamese taekwondo practitioner (1991–2015)

- Hoàng Hà Giang at the 2006 Asian Games

Personal information
- Nationality: Vietnamese
- Born: Hoàng Hà Giang; 30 April 1991 Ho Chi Minh City, Vietnam
- Died: 7 December 2015 (aged 24) Ho Chi Minh City, Vietnam

Sport
- Sport: Taekwondo
- Event: –55 kg
- Turned pro: 2006
- Retired: 2008
Medal record
Representing Vietnam
Asian Games
Silver medal – second place	2006 Doha	–55 kg

Hoàng Hà Giang (30 April 1991 – 7 December 2015) was a Vietnamese taekwondo practitioner who won a silver medal at the 2006 Asian Games.

In 2008, when just 17 years old and qualified for Beijing Olympic, Hà Giang was diagnosed with SLE, which made her give up this competition and retire from professional taekwondo. In 2013, she was caught in a traffic accident that broke her leg. She died on 7 December 2015.
