= Nepal at the 2006 Asian Games =

- IOC code: NEP
- NOC: Nepal Olympic Committee

in Doha
- Medals Ranked 35th: Gold 0 Silver 0 Bronze 3 Total 3

Asian Games appearances (overview)
- 1951; 1954; 1958; 1962; 1966; 1970; 1974; 1978; 1982; 1986; 1990; 1994; 1998; 2002; 2006; 2010; 2014; 2018; 2022; 2026

Nepal participated in the 15th Asian Games, officially known as the XV Asiad held in Doha from December 1 to December 15, 2006. Nepal ranked 35th with 3 bronze medals in this edition of the Asiad.

== Medalists ==
Medal	Name	Sport	Event	Date
Bronze	Manita Shahi	Taekwondo	Women's 63 kg	7
Bronze	Deepak Bista	Taekwondo	Men's 78 kg	8
Bronze	Ayasha Shakya	Taekwondo	Women's 59 kg	10
