= Deepak Bista =

Nepalese taekwondo practitioner

Deepak Bista OLY
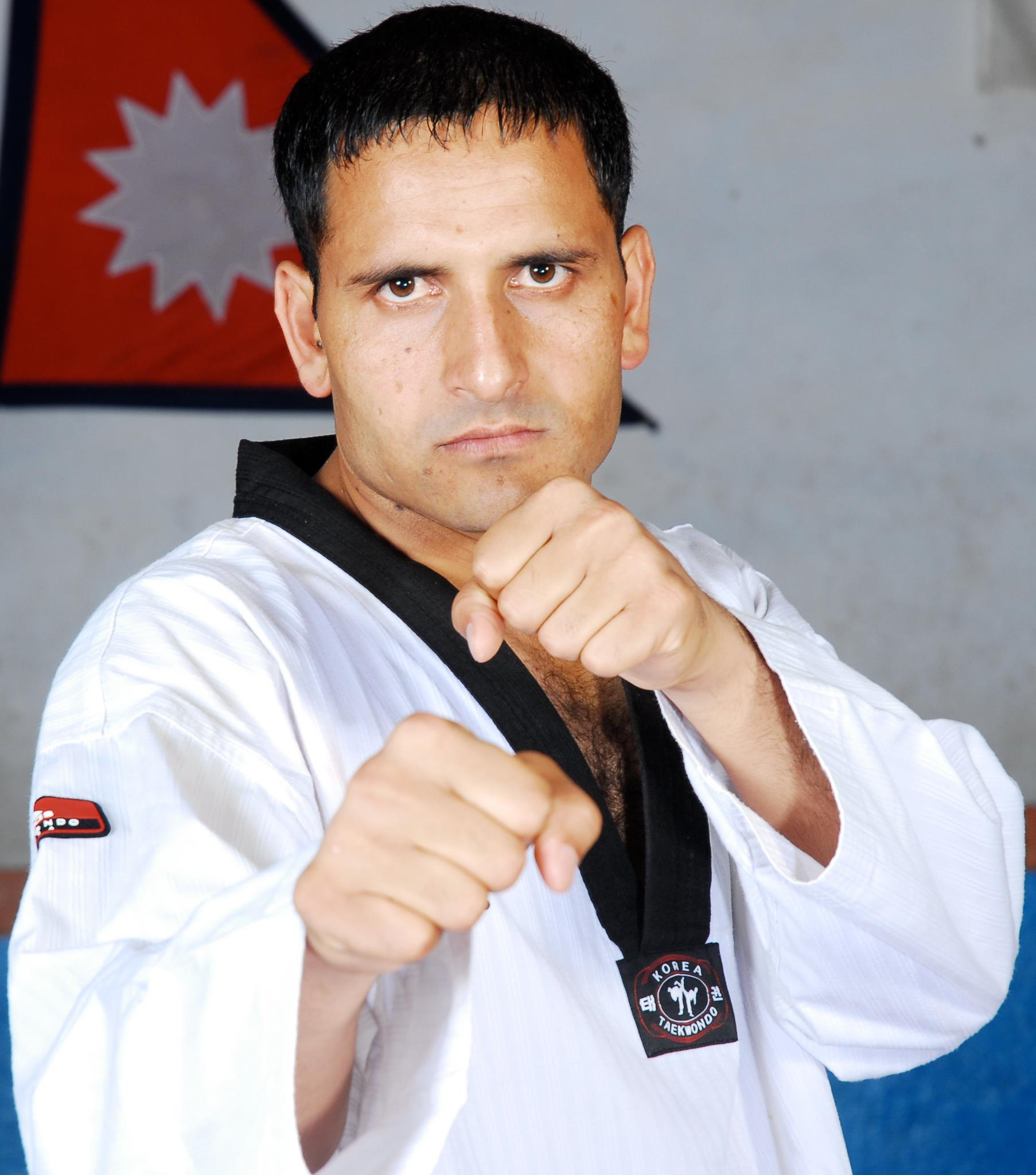
- Olympian Deepak Bista

Personal information
- Native name: दीपक विष्ट
- Born: 2 July 1976 (age 50) Kanchanpur, Nepal
- Height: 179 cm (5 ft 10 in)
- Spouse: Ayasha Shakya
- Parents: Mahabir Bista (father); Kalawati Devi Bista (mother)

Sport
- Country: Nepal
- Sport: Taekwondo
- Event: Kyorugi
Medal record
Men's taekwondo
Representing Nepal
Asian Games
Bronze medal – third place	2002 Busan	Featherweight
Bronze medal – third place	2006 Doha	Welterweight
South Asian Games
Gold medal – first place	1999 Kathmandu
Gold medal – first place	2004 Islamabad
Gold medal – first place	2006 Colombo
Gold medal – first place	2010 Dhaka
Taekwondo at the 2008 Summer Olympics – Qualification
Bronze medal – third place	Ho Chi Minh City, Vietnam Asian 2007

Deepak Bista (Nepali: दीपक विष्ट, born 2 July 1976) is a male Nepalese taekwondo former player and practitioner. One of the most popular and highly popular sportsperson in Nepal, he competed at the 2008 Summer Olympics. On August 8, 2008, at the opening ceremony of the Beijing Olympics, Bista was the flagbearer for Nepal.

Bista is the first Nepalese male athlete Qualification to be selected for the 2008 Summer Olympics He won two consecutive bronze medals in the Asian Games and a historical four consecutive gold medals in the South Asian Games.

Bista is an undefeated player in South Asian Region and holds the record for the highest number of gold medals, tied with Gaurika Singh, in the South Asian Games.

Bista played taekwondo for a long time as an athlete in the Nepal Taekwondo Association then he officially retired from taekwondo in 2015. In 2021, he was elected as president of Nepal Olympian Association.

== Personal life ==
Deepak Bista married Ayasha Shakya in 2011. They have two sons.

== Awards and Prizes ==
1. 3rd Suprabl Gorkha Dakshin Bahu - 2000 AD
2. 3rd Subikhayat Trishakti Patta - 2003 AD
3. 3rd Supradipta Birendra Prajantantra Bhaskar - 2005 AD
4. 4th Shree Prabal Jana Sewa Shree - 2023 AD

== Gallery ==
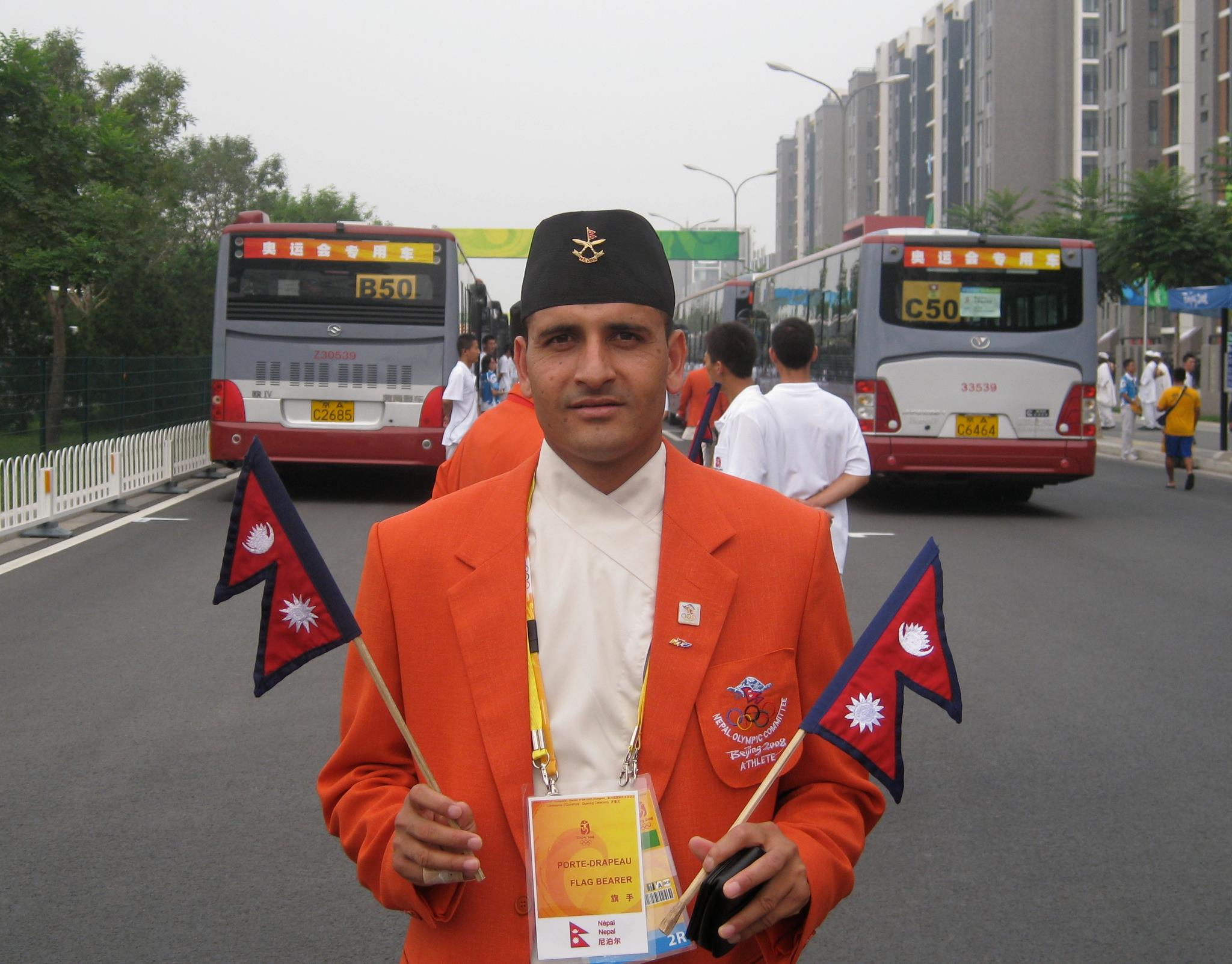
Deepak Bista at Olympics

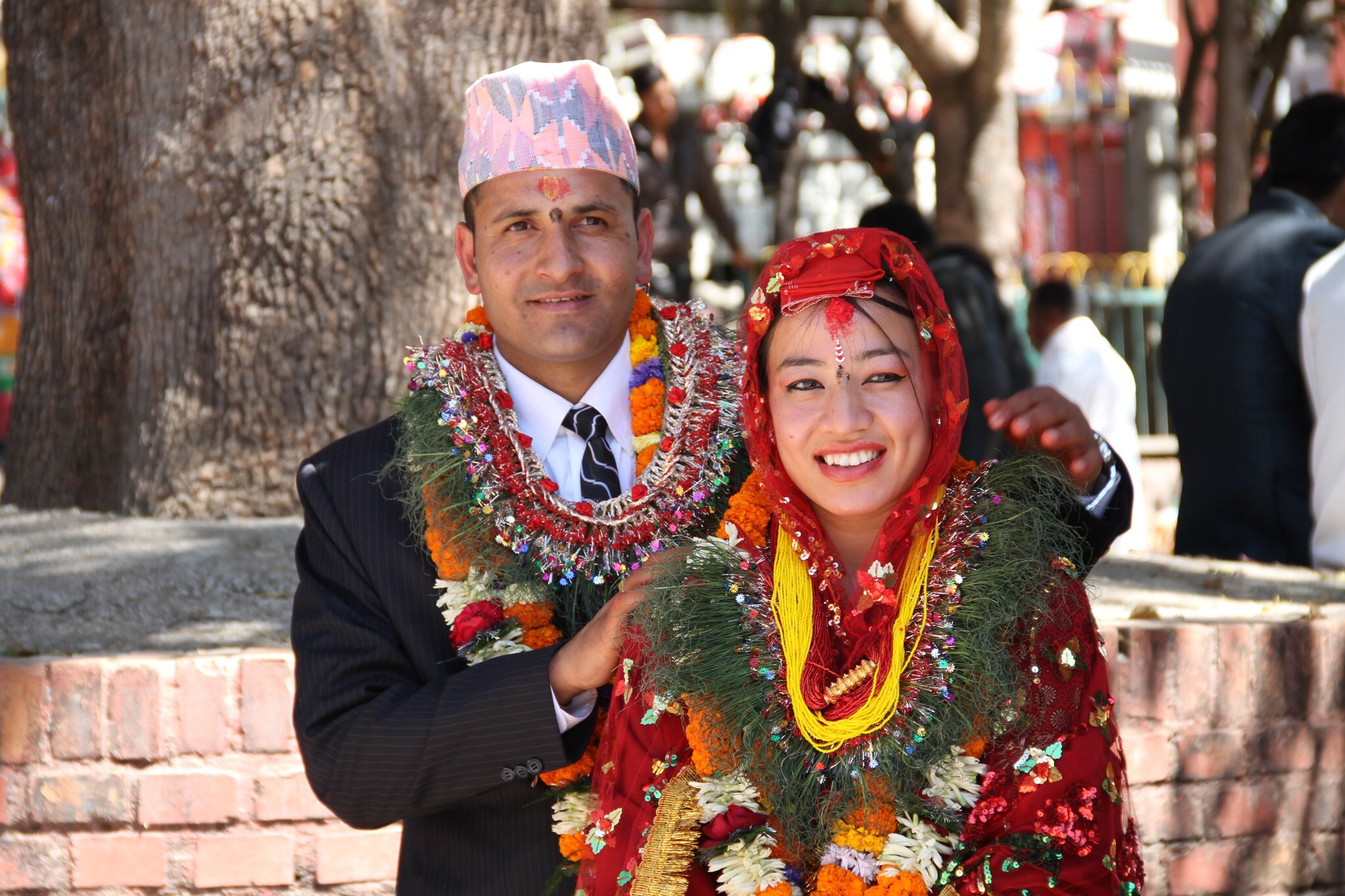
Deepak Bista married Ayasha Shakya in 2011.

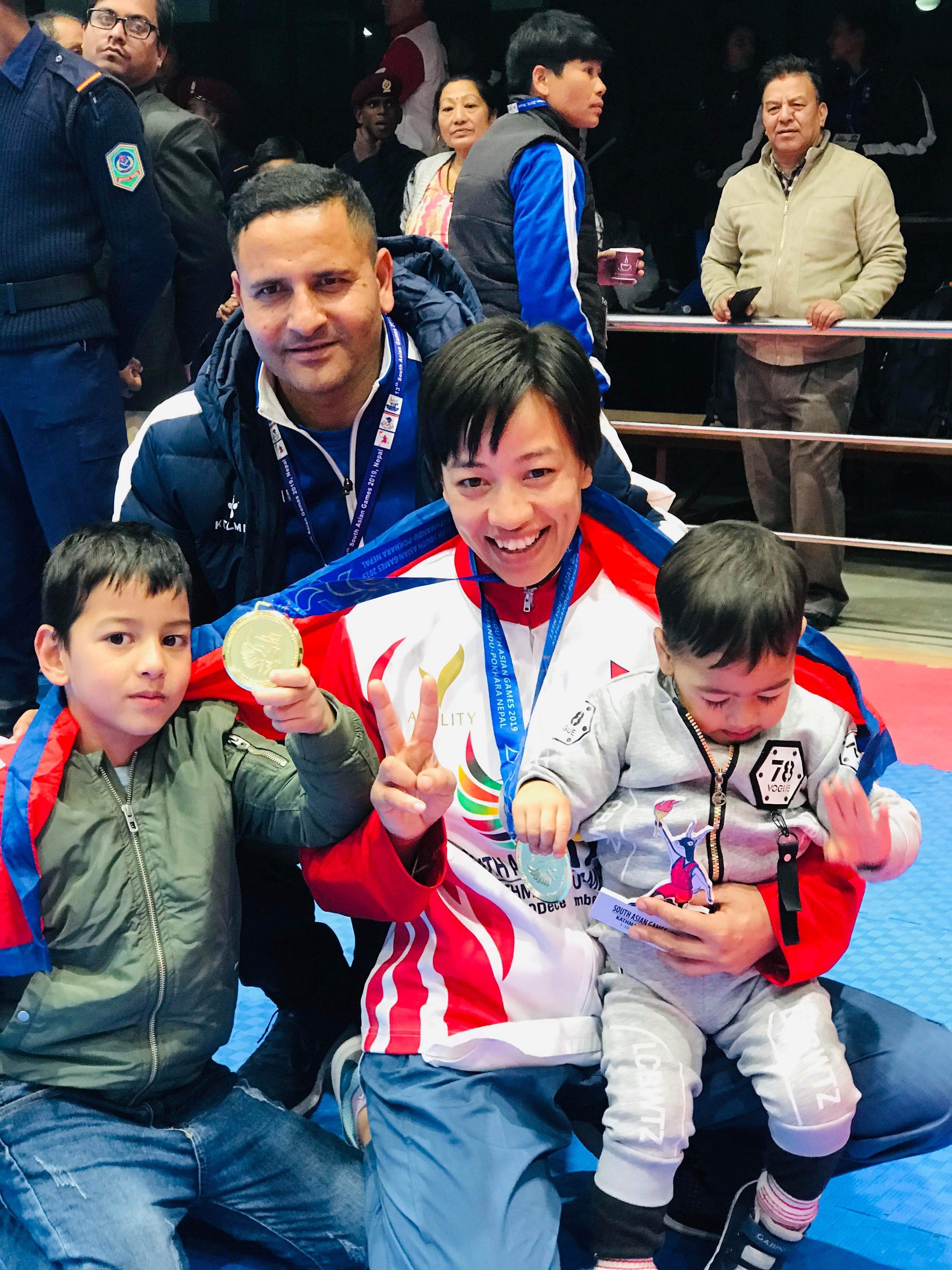
Ayasha Shakya celebrates her gold medal win with her family(2019)
