= Lee Sung-hye (taekwondo) =

South Korean taekwondo practitioner

Medal record

Women's taekwondo

Representing South Korea

World Championships
| Gold medal – first place | 2007 Beijing | Featherweight |

Asian Games
| Gold medal – first place | 2010 Guangzhou | Featherweight |
| Gold medal – first place | 2006 Doha | Featherweight |

Universiade
| Gold medal – first place | 2005 Izmir | Featherweight |

Lee Sung-Hye (Korean: 이성혜, born October 21, 1984, in Seoul) is a South Korean taekwondo practitioner. She is the first female South Korean taekwondo athlete to win two gold medals at the Asian Games.
