= Ayasha Shakya =

Nepalese taekwondo practitioner (born 1987)

Personal information
- Native name: आयशा शाक्य
- Nationality: Nepali
- Born: 28 July 1987 (age 39) Lalitpur, Nepal
- Height: 1.68 m (5 ft 6 in)
- Spouse: Deepak Bista

Sport
- Country: Nepal
- Sport: Taekwondo
Medal record
Women's taekwondo
Representing Nepal
Asian Games
Bronze medal – third place	2006 Doha	-59 Kg
South Asian Games
Gold medal – first place	2010 Dhaka
Gold medal – first place	2019 Kathmandu
Gold medal – first place	2019 Kathmandu

Ayasha Shakya (आयशा शाक्य) (born 28 July 1987 in Lalitpur) is a Nepalese Taekwondo practitioner. Shakya played taekwondo for a long time as an athlete in the Nepal Taekwondo Association. She won two gold medals in both the individual and pair poomsae category for Nepal in the 2019 South Asian Games. A mother of two, she has given encouragement to women who quit sports after getting married or having children. She also won a gold medal for Nepal in the 2010 South Asian Games.

Shakya won a Bronze medal for Nepal in the 2006 Asian Games 2006 Doha.

In 2019, Shakya won the gold medal at the 13th South Asian Games in the above 30 years category.

== Personal life ==
Shakya married Deepak Bista in 2011. They have two sons.
