= Iraq at the 2006 Asian Games =

- IOC code: IRQ
- NOC: National Olympic Committee of Iraq

in Doha
- Competitors: 86
- Medals Ranked 29th: Gold 0 Silver 2 Bronze 1 Total 3

Asian Games appearances (overview)
- 1974; 1978; 1982; 1986; 1990–2002; 2006; 2010; 2014; 2018; 2022; 2026

Iraq, despite going through a civil war, participated in the 2006 Asian Games held in Doha, Qatar.

The country was represented by 86 athletes participating in 17 sports, including football, cue sports, and weightlifting. Its last medals at the Asian Games were in 1986 at Seoul, South Korea, where it won five silver and two bronze medals.

== Participation details ==
=== Boxing ===
Five boxers represented Iraq in this edition of the Asiad. Three of the five athletes made it to the quarterfinals but none succeeded in pushing through the semifinals, leaving Iraq ranked 15th in boxing.

==== Entry list ====
- Featherweight - MAHDI Suraka
- Flyweight - MUTUSHR Majeed
- Light Flyweight - NAJAH Ali
- Light Welterweight - ZUHIR Jabar
- Heavyweight - ALI Salman

==== Results ====
- Venue: ASPIRE Hall 5

Qualification bouts December 2, 2006
Weight division	Corner-Name (NOC)	Winner	Points	Time/Decision
Featherweight	RED (Iraq) MAHDI Suraka (IRQ); BLUE (Pakistan) SAJID Muhamad (PAK)	RED	+27:27	PTS^{1}
Preliminary bouts December 3, 2006
Flyweight	BLUE (Iraq) MUTUSHR Majeed (IRQ); RED (Japan) SUSA Katsuaki (JPN)	RED	4:24	RSCOS-R3
Featherweight	BLUE (Iraq) MAHDI Suraka (IRQ); RED (Philippines) MARCIAL Anthony (PHI)	RED	4:24	RSCOS-R2
December 4, 2006
Light Flyweight	RED (Iraq) NAJAH Ali (IRQ); BLUE (Mongolia) JIGJID Otgonbayar (MGL)	RED	33:8	PTS
December 5, 2006
Light Welterweight	BLUE (Iraq) ZUHIR Jabar (IRQ); RED (Afghanistan) AMINI Mohammad Naim (AFG)	BLUE	34:13	PTS
Quarterfinals; December 7, 2006
Light Welterweight	RED (Iraq) ZUHIR Jabar (IRQ); BLUE (South Korea) SHIN Myung Hoon (KOR)	BLUE	10:29	PTS
December 8, 2006
Light Flyweight	BLUE (Iraq) NAJAH Ali (IRQ); RED (Thailand) PANNON Suban (THA)	RED	21:30	PTS
Heavyweight	BLUE (Iraq) ALI Salman (IRQ); RED (Kazakhstan) GOTFRID Dmitriy (KAZ)	RED	2:22	RSCOS-R2

Legend:
PTS - Points, Referee Stop Contest, RSCOS - Referee Stop Contest Outscored, R - Round

^1 The winner was based on the points scored on the third round

=== Football ===
==== Round One ====
===== Group B =====
Unlike other nations, Iraqi olympic football team (U-23) represented the nation in the Asian games.

Pos	Team	Pld	W	D	L	GF	GA	GD	Pts
1	Iraq	3	2	1	0	8	0	+8	7
2	Syria	3	1	2	0	4	1	+3	5
3	Singapore	3	0	2	1	1	3	−2	2
4	Indonesia	3	0	1	2	2	11	−9	1

Source: RSSSF
November 18, 2006
18:00

Indonesia	0–6	Iraq
		Karrar 18'; Ahmed 24'; Mostafa 36', 63'; Alwan 82'; Rehema 89'

Al-Ahly Stadium
Attendance: 1300
Referee: Yang Zhiqiang (China)

November 21, 2006
18:00

Iraq	2–0	Singapore
Mostafa 5'; Mahmoud 7'

Al-Ahly Stadium
Attendance: 300
Referee: Abdullah Balideh (Qatar)

November 24, 2006
18:00

Iraq	0–0	Syria

Al-Ahly Stadium
Attendance: 2200
Referee: Krishnan Ramachandran (Malaysia)

==== Round Two ====
===== Group E =====
Pos	Team	Pld	W	D	L	GF	GA	GD	Pts
1	China	3	3	0	0	6	2	+4	9
2	Iraq	3	2	0	1	6	1	+5	6
3	Oman	3	1	0	2	4	5	−1	3
4	Malaysia	3	0	0	3	2	10	−8	0

Source: RSSSF
November 29, 2006
19:45

China	1–0	Iraq
Zhou Haibin 7'

Grand Hamad Stadium
Attendance: 615
Referee: Abdulrahman Abdou (Qatar)

December 3, 2006
19:45

Oman	0–2	Iraq
		Rehema 30'; Abdul-Zahra 47'+

Grand Hamad Stadium
Referee: Ajja Gowder (India)

December 6, 2006
19:45

Malaysia	0–4	Iraq
		Rehema 14'; Mahmoud 54', 55'; Mostafa 65'

Grand Hamad Stadium
Referee: Naser Alghafary (Jordan)

==== Quarterfinal ====
December 9, 2006
16:00

Uzbekistan	1–2	Iraq
Geyhrikh 46'+		Karra 10'; Alwan 95'

Al-Gharrafa Stadium
Referee: Krishnan Ramachandran (Malaysia)

==== Semi finals ====
December 12, 2006
16:00

Iraq	1–0	South Korea
Samer 24'

Jassim Bin Hamad Stadium
Referee: Ali Albadwawi (UAE)

==== Gold medal match ====
December 15, 2006
15:00

Qatar	1–0	Iraq
Bilal 65'

Jassim Bin Hamad Stadium
Referee: Hiroyoshi Takayama (Japan)

Iraq wins silver medal

=== Weightlifting ===
The 21-year-old Harem Ali earned Iraq its first medal in the 2006 Asian games, as he captured bronze in the Men's 77 kg.

==== Men's 77Kg ====
- December 4, 18:00
- Al-Dana Banquet Hall

Athlete	NOC	Snatch	Clean & Jerk	Total
LI Hongli	(China)	165	196	361
LEE Jeong Jae	(South Korea)	150	191	341
ALI Harem	(Iraq)	155	186	341

==== Men's 105Kg ====
- December 6, 16:00
- Al-Dana Banquet Hall

Athlete	NOC	Snatch	Clean & Jerk	Total
JOUGHILI Ahed	(Syria)	170	222	392
ALJUAIFRI Mahammad	(Iraq)	175	216	391
AKHMETOV Bakhyt	(Kazakhstan)	175	213	388
KIM Wha Seung	(South Korea)	176	200	376
KHUDAIR Khudair	(Iraq)	165	205	370

==== Men's 105+ Kg ====
- December 6, 19:00
- Al-Dana Banquet Hall

Athlete	NOC	Snatch	Clean & Jerk	Total
REZA ZADEH Hossein	(Iran)	195	230	425
SALEM Jaber	(Qatar)	185	225	410
MARTEMYANOV Andrey	(Uzbekistan)	168	213	381
MHAMED Haidar	(Iraq)	174	206	380
