= Antonio Gabica =

Philippine pool player, born October 1972

Personal information
- Nickname: "Ga-Ga"
- Born: October 2, 1972 (age 53) Cotabato City

Pool career
- Country: Philippines
- Best finish: Runner-up 2013 WPA World Nine-ball Championship
Medal record
Men's Eight-ball
Representing Philippines
Asian Games
Silver medal – second place	2006 Doha	Singles
Southeast Asian Games
Gold medal – first place	2005 Manila	Doubles
Men's Nine-ball
Representing Philippines
Asian Games
Gold medal – first place	2006 Doha	Singles
Southeast Asian Games
Gold medal – first place	2007 Nakhon Ratchasima	Doubles
Bronze medal – third place	2007 Nakhon Ratchasima	Singles
Men's 15-ball
Representing Philippines
Silver medal – second place	2005 Manila	Singles

Antonio Gabica (born October 2, 1972) is a Philippine pool player. Gabica was the runner up at the 2013 WPA World Nine-ball Championship.

== Titles ==
- 2008 Mandaluyong Mayor's Cup
- 2007 Philippine 9-Ball Open
- 2007 San Miguel Beer World 9-Ball Challenge
- 2007 Southeast Asian Games Nine-ball Doubles
- 2006 Philippine Sportsman of the Year
- 2006 Asian Games Nine-ball Singles
- 2005 Southeast Asian Games Eight-ball Doubles
- 2004 MotoLite Philippine 9-Ball Open

High ranking runout against Dennis Orcullo (11 racks total)
