= Philippines at the 2006 Asian Games =

- IOC code: PHI
- NOC: Philippine Olympic Committee
- Website: www.olympic.ph (in English)

in Doha
- Competitors: 233
- Flag bearer: Paeng Nepomuceno
- Medals Ranked 18th: Gold 4 Silver 6 Bronze 9 Total 19

Asian Games appearances (overview)
- 1951; 1954; 1958; 1962; 1966; 1970; 1974; 1978; 1982; 1986; 1990; 1994; 1998; 2002; 2006; 2010; 2014; 2018; 2022; 2026

The Philippines participated in the 2006 Asian Games held in Doha, Qatar; for the 15th straight time in the same number of stagings of the Games. The country did not participate in Men's and Women's Basketball for the first time due to the continuing suspension by International Basketball Federation (Fédération Internationale de Basketball or FIBA).

The country was represented by 233 athletes participating in 31 sports, including boxing, cue sports, and taekwondo which brought the most medals to the country.

== Medalists ==
=== Gold ===
No.	Medal	Name	Sport	Event
1	Gold	Violito Payla	Boxing	Flyweight 51kg
2	Gold	Joan Tipon	Boxing	Bantamweight 54kg
3	Gold	Antonio Gabica	Cue sports	Men's 9-Ball Singles
4	Gold	Rene Catalan	Wushu	Men's Sanda 52kg

=== Silver ===
No.	Medal	Name	Sport	Event
1	Silver	Antonio Gabica	Cue sports	Men's 8-Ball Singles
2	Silver	Jeff de Luna	Cue sports	Men's 9-Ball Singles
3	Silver	Marne Pabillore	Karate	Women's Kumite -53kg
4	Silver	Tshomlee Go	Taekwondo	Men's Bantamweight -62kg
5	Silver	Toni Rivero	Taekwondo	Women's Welterweight -67kg
6	Silver	Eduard Folayang	Wushu	Men's Sanda 70kg

=== Bronze ===
No.	Medal	Name	Sport	Event
1	Bronze	Godfrey Castro	Boxing	Light flyweight 48kg
2	Bronze	Genebert Basadre	Boxing	Lightweight 60kg
3	Bronze	Michael Bibat	Golf	Men's Individual
4	Bronze	Noel Espinosa	Karate	Men's Kata
5	Bronze	Manuel Rivero	Taekwondo	Men's Featherweight -67kg
6	Bronze	Eunice Alora	Taekwondo	Women's Finweight -47kg
7	Bronze	Veronica Domingo	Taekwondo	Women's Lightweight -63kg
8	Bronze	Cecil Mamiit	Tennis	Men's Singles
9	Bronze	Cecil Mamiit; Eric Taino	Tennis	Men's Doubles

=== Multiple ===
Name	Sport	Gold	Silver	Bronze	Total
Antonio Gabica	Cue sports	1	1	0	2
Cecil Mamiit	Tennis	0	0	2	2

== Medal summary ==
=== Medal by sports ===
Sports	Gold	Silver	Bronze	Total
Boxing	2	0	2	4
Cue sports	1	2	0	3
Wushu	1	1	0	2
Taekwondo	0	2	3	5
Karate	0	1	1	2
Tennis	0	0	2	2
Golf	0	0	1	1

== Participation details ==
=== Baseball ===
The 2005 Southeast Asian Games (SEA Games) gold medallists and Southeast Asian powerhouse competed in the Baseball competitions of this edition of the Asian Games, and went up against World Baseball Classic (WBC) champions Japan, Korea, China, Chinese Taipei, and Thailand.

The country finished last in the field after an upset by neighbor Thailand in their last match, 1–8.

==== Standings ====
Rank		W	L	Pct.	RS	RA	DI	RA/9DI
6	Philippines	0	5	.000	9	67	31.1	19.25

==== Results ====
- Match 2: vs Japan (JPN)

Game time: November 29 13:30 (UTC+3)
Venue: Al-Rayyan Sports Club

Team	1	2	3	4	5	6	7	8	9	R	H	E
Japan	8	1	1	7	0	×	×	×	×	17	13	0
Philippines	0	0	0	2	0	×	×	×	×	2	3	1
WP: ISHIGURO Takuya (1-0) LP: LABRADOR Charlie (0-1) Note: Completed early due to Run Difference Rule (RDR); Home runs: JPN: SUZUKI Kenji; PHI: 0

- Match 4: vs China (CHN)

Game time: November 30 13:30 (UTC+3)
Venue: Al-Rayyan Sports Club

Team	1	2	3	4	5	6	7	8	9	R	H	E
China	0	4	3	2	6	0	0	×	×	15	17	1
Philippines	0	0	0	2	0	2	0	×	×	4	8	2
WP: Zhang Wanjun (1-0) LP: BINARAO Ernesto (0-1) Note: Completed early due to Run Difference Rule (RDR); Home runs: CHN: WANG Wei; PHI: 0

- Match 7: vs (South Korea) Korea Republic (KOR)

Game time: December 3 09:00(UTC+3)
Venue: Al-Rayyan Sports Club

Team	1	2	3	4	5	6	7	8	9	R	H	E
Philippines	0	0	1	0	0	0	1	×	×	2	2	0
(South Korea) Korea Republic	3	4	2	2	0	0	1	×	×	12	12	1
WP: JANG Won Sam (1-0) LP: DELA CALZADA Darwin (0-1) Note: Completed early due to Run Difference Rule (RDR); Home runs: PHI: 0 KOR: CHO Dong Chan, LEE Dae Ho, LEE Jin Young

- Match 12: vs Chinese Taipei (TPE)

Game time: December 5 13:30(UTC+3)
Venue: Al-Rayyan Sports Club

Team	1	2	3	4	5	6	7	8	9	R	H	E
Philippines	0	0	0	0	0	×	×	×	×	0	4	2
Chinese Taipei	7	1	0	5	2	×	×	×	×	15	17	1
WP: LIN Ko Chien (1-0) LP: LABRADOR Charlie (0-2) Note: Completed early due to Run Difference Rule (RDR); Home runs: PHI: 0 TPE: CHEN Yung Chi, LIN Chih Sheng

- Match 13: vs Thailand (THA)

Game time: December 6 09:00 (UTC+3)
Venue: Al-Rayyan Sports Club

Team	1	2	3	4	5	6	7	8	9	R	H	E
Thailand	0	0	0	1	0	0	0	0	7	8	11	2
Philippines	0	0	0	0	0	1	0	0	0	1	8	1
WP: HEEBTHONG Krissada (1-2) LP: DELA CALZADA Darwin (0-2); Home runs: THA: 0 PHI: 0

=== Boxing ===
Seven amateur boxers compete for 11 gold medals at stake in this edition of the Asiad. Two out of the eight boxers are gold medal winners in the last 2005 SEA Games. Four boxers qualified for the semifinals and two boxers reached the final bouts slated on 13 December.

==== Standings ====
Rank		Gold	Silver	Bronze	Total
3	Philippines	2	0	2	4

==== Bout details ====
Quarterfinal bouts December 7, 2006
Weight division	Corner-Name (NOC)	Winner	Points	Time/Decision
Flyweight	RED (Philippines) Violito Payla (PHI); BLUE (India) Jitender Kumar (IND)	RED	27:7	PTS
Featherweight	RED (Philippines) Anthony Marcial (PHI); BLUE (Kazakhstan) Galib Jafarov (KAZ)	BLUE	12:27	PTS
December 8, 2006
Light Flyweight	RED (Philippines) Godfrey Castro (PHI); BLUE (Saudi Arabia) Ali Saad Al Ahmry (KSA)	RED	25:5	RSCOS-R2
Bantamweight	BLUE (Philippines) Joan Tipon (PHI); RED (North Korea) Won Guk Kim (PRK)	BLUE	22:15	PTS
December 9, 2006
Lightweight	RED (Philippines) Genebert Basadre (PHI); BLUE (Turkmenistan) Serdar Hudayberdiyev (TKM)	RED	24:4	RSCOS-R3
Semifinals; December 10, 2006
Flyweight	BLUE (Philippines) Violito Payla (PHI); RED (China) Bo Yang (CHN)	BLUE	40:20	RSCOS-R3
December 11, 2006
Light Flyweight	RED (Philippines) Godfrey Castro (PHI); BLUE (Thailand) Suban Pannon (THA)	BLUE	20:40	RSCOS-R3
Bantamweight	BLUE (Philippines) Joan Tipon (PHI); RED (Thailand) Worapoj Petchkoom (THA)	BLUE	+13:13	PTS
Lightweight	BLUE (Philippines) Genebert Basadre (PHI); RED (China) Hu Qing (CHN)	RED	29:18	PTS
Finals; December 12, 2006
Flyweight	BLUE (Philippines) Violito Payla (PHI); RED (Thailand) Somjit Jongjohor (THA)	BLUE	31:15	PTS
December 13, 2006
Bantamweight	RED (Philippines) Joan Tipon (PHI); BLUE (South Korea) Han Soon Chul (KOR)	RED	21:10	PTS

Legend:
PTS - Points, RSCOS - Referee Stop Contest Outscored, R - Round

=== Gymnastics Artistic ===
The country was represented by a lone male gymnast, Roel Ramirez. He qualified for the Finals of Men's Vault Event, and finished sixth in the field.

==== Results ====
Qualified for the Finals	Finals

Event	Score	Rank	Remarks
Team Final and Individual Qualification - PHI	78.100	20	Team
Team Final and Individual Qualification	78.2	33	All-around
Team Final and Individual Qualification - Floor	14.250	23	Individual
Men's Team Final and Individual Qualification - Horizontal Bar	12.600	50	Individual
Team Final and Individual Qualification - Parallel Bars	11.250	67	Individual
Team Final and Individual Qualification - Rings	10.750	64	Individual
Team Final and Individual Qualification - Vault	15.750	6	Individual
Team Final and Individual Qualification - Pommel Horse	13.600	35	Individual
Men's Vault Final - Vault	15.700	6	Individual

=== Sepaktakraw ===
As released by the DAGOC at the same date at the Games website, the Philippines will be joined by Southeast Asian neighbors Indonesia and Malaysia in Group C in Men's Regu, and Thailand, Myanmar, and Japan in Group A in Women's Regu. The nation competes also with Thailand and Indonesia in Group A of Men's Doubles, and Thailand, Vietnam, and China in Women's Doubles.

=== Swimming ===
Ten swimmers represented the country in the competitions in this edition of the Games.

==== Entry list ====
- UY Kendrick
- COAKLEY Daniel
- MOLINA Miguel
- AGUILAR Johansen Benedict
- ARABEJO Ryan Paolo
- WALSH James
- DEE Ernest Lorenzo
- BORDADO Gerard
- TOTTEN Erica
- GANDIONCO Maria Giorgina
- CORDERO Denjylie

==== Results ====
Qualified for Finals	Finals

December 2, 2006
Event No.	Event	Phase	Rank	Lane	Swimmer	Time
1	Women's 200m Free	Heat 1	5	2	GANDIONCO Maria Giorgina	2:09:72
1	Women's 200m Free	Heat 2	5	3	TOTTEN Erica	2:08:83
2	Men's 400m IM	Heat 1	2	4	MOLINA Miguel	4:28.99
2	Men's 400m IM	Finals	4	6	MOLINA Miguel	4:28.44
3	Women's 100m Fly	Heat 1	5	2	TOTTEN Erica	1:08.04
4	Women's 50m Breast	Heat 2	5	2	CORDERO Denjylie	36.02
5	Men's 200m Fly	Heat 1	4	6	WALSH James	2:01.94
5	Men's 200m Fly	Finals	8	7	WALSH James	2:01.95
December 3, 2006
Event No.	Event	Phase	Rank	Lane	Swimmer	Time
7	Men's 100m Fly	Heat 2	6	7	DEE Ernest Lorenzo	57.18
7	Men's 100m Fly	Heat 4	5	7	WALSH James	55.91
9	Men's 200m Free	Heat 3	4	3	MOLINA Miguel	1:54.62
9	Men's 200m Free	Heat 4	8	8	UY Kendrick	2:04.80
11	Men's 50m Breast	Heat 3	3	8	MOLINA Miguel	29.44
11	Men's 50m Breast	Heat 4	6	7	BORDADO Gerard	30.15
December 4, 2006
Event No.	Event	Phase	Rank	Lane	Swimmer/s	Time
14	Men's 50m Free	Heat 3	5	2	COAKLEY Daniel	23.98
14	Men's 50m Free	Heat 4	8	1	UY Kendrick	24.54
15	Women's 400m Free	Heat 3	4	3	TOTTEN Erica	4:27:98
15	Women's 400m Free	Heat 3	5	2	GANDIONCO, Maria Giorgina	4:28:68
16	Men's 100m Breast	Heat 5	6	7	BORDADO Gerard	1:05.47
17	Women's 200m Fly	Heat 1	4	2	GANDIONCO, Maria Giorgina	2:22.70
17	Women's 200m Fly	Heat 2	6	2	TOTTEN Erica	2:24.89
19	Men's 4 × 200 m Free Relay	Heat 1	4	4	MOLINA Miguel; DEE Ernest Lorenzo; WALSH James; ARABEJO Ryan Paolo	7:44.98
19	Men's 4 × 200 m Free Relay	Finals	6	7	MOLINA Miguel; ARABEJO Ryan Paolo; DEE Ernest Lorenzo; WALSH James	7:44.93
December 5, 2006
Event No.	Event	Phase	Rank	Lane	Swimmer/s	Time
20	Men's 50m Fly	Heat 2	2	2	DEE Ernest Lorenzo	26.13
20	Men's 50m Fly	Heat 5	5	1	WALSH James	26.02
21	Women's 100m Breast	Heat 1	5	2	CORDERO Denjylie	1:17.33
22	Men's 400m Free	Heat 3	5	2	ARABEJO, Ryan Paolo	4:05.60
23	Women's 50m Free	Heat 4	7	1	TOTTEN Erica	27.91
24	Men's 100m Back	Heat 4	7	7	ARABEJO, Ryan Paolo	1:01.57
26	Men's 4 × 100 m Free Relay	Heat 2	4	3	UY Kendrick; COAKLEY Daniel; WALSH James; MOLINA Miguel	3:31.91
26	Men's 4 × 100 m Free Relay	Finals	6	2	MOLINA Miguel; COAKLEY Daniel; WALSH James; UY Kendrick	3:31.00
December 6, 2006
Event No.	Event	Phase	Rank	Lane	Swimmer/s	Time
27	Women's 100m Free	Heat 2	5	7	TOTTEN Erica	59.44
28	Men's 100m Free	Heat 5	5	7	UY Kendrick	52.83
29	Women's 200m Breast	Heat 1	6	7	CORDERO Denjylie	2:41.41
30	Men's 200m IM	Heat 3	3	3	MOLINA Miguel	2:08.18
30	Men's 200m IM	Finals	5	7	MOLINA Miguel	2:05.18
32	Women's 800m Free	Finals 2	3	6	GANDIONCO Maria Giorgina	9:14.80

=== Taekwondo ===
Twelve taekwondo jins represented the country in the competitions for this edition of the Asiad. The team accumulated five medals: two silvers and three bronzes, marking the best showing of the country (so far) in the sport in this quadrennial event.

==== Standings ====
Rank		Gold	Silver	Bronze	Total
9	Philippines	0	2	3	5

=== Withdrawn events ===
- Softball: The 2005 SEA Games gold medallists and Southeast Asian powerhouse was reported to participate in the Games, however current revisions on the schedule reflect otherwise.
- Water Polo: As released by the Doha Asian Games Organizing Committee (DAGOC) on September 7, 2006, at the Games website, the 2005 SEA Games silver medallists was supposed to compete in this sport; however, the country was not able to send a team due to priority given to the baseball team, as the lone team sport contingent to the Games. The supposed-to-be opponents of the team in Group A will be awarded automatic wins (with a score of 5-0).

== See also ==
- 2006 Asian Games
- FESPIC Games
