= Tennis at the 2006 Asian Games – Men's doubles =

Men's doubles at the 2006 Asian Games
- Venue: Khalifa International Tennis and Squash Complex
- Dates: 8–13 December 2006
- Competitors: 64 from 20 nations

Medalists
gold medal	Leander Paes; Mahesh Bhupathi	India
silver medal	Sanchai Ratiwatana; Sonchat Ratiwatana	Thailand
bronze medal	Cecil Mamiit; Eric Taino	Philippines
bronze medal	Jun Woong-sun; Kim Sun-yong	South Korea

Men's doubles
- Tennis at the 2006 Asian Games

Events
Singles	men	women
Doubles	men	women	mixed
Team	men	women
- Asian Games

Men's doubles at the 2006 Asian Games was won by Mahesh Bhupathi and Leander Paes of India.

== Schedule ==
All times are Arabia Standard Time (UTC+03:00)

Date	Time	Event
Friday, 8 December 2006	10:00	Round of 32
Saturday, 9 December 2006	12:00	Round of 32
Sunday, 10 December 2006	11:00	Round of 16
Monday, 11 December 2006	11:00	Quarterfinals
Tuesday, 12 December 2006	11:00	Semifinals
Wednesday, 13 December 2006	13:00	Final

== Results ==
=== Final ===
Final
1	Leander Paes (IND); Mahesh Bhupathi (IND)	5	7^{9}	6
2	Sanchai Ratiwatana (THA); Sonchat Ratiwatana (THA)	7	6^{7}	3

=== Top half ===
Round of 32
1	Leander Paes (IND); Mahesh Bhupathi (IND)	6	6
Yu Hiu Tung (HKG); Wayne Wong (HKG)	0	4
Khaled Al-Thawadi (BRN); Abdulkarim Abdulreda (BRN)	0	3
Mohammad Ghareeb (KUW); Ahmad Al-Rabee (KUW)	6	6
Farhod Saidov (TJK); Rahmatullo Rajabaliev (TJK)	0	1
Sultan Al-Alawi (QAT); Abdulla Al-Haji (QAT)	6	6
Aisam-ul-Haq Qureshi (PAK); Aqeel Khan (PAK)	6	3	7
6	Zeng Shaoxuan (CHN); Yu Xinyuan (CHN)	3	6	5
3	Denis Istomin (UZB); Murad Inoyatov (UZB)	6	6
Go Soeda (JPN); Toshihide Matsui (JPN)	1	2
Edgar Wong (MAC); Lei Hou In (MAC)	6	3	4
Baataryn Oyuunbat (MGL); Mönkhbaataryn Badrakh (MGL)	4	6	6
Sankha Atukorale (SRI); Dinusha Wijesuriya (SRI)	0	2
Chen Ti (TPE); Yi Chu-huan (TPE)	6	6
Chung Hee-seok (KOR); An Jae-sung (KOR)	6	3	6^{4}
5	Cecil Mamiit (PHI); Eric Taino (PHI)	0	6	7^{7}

Round of 16
1	Leander Paes (IND); Mahesh Bhupathi (IND)	6	6
Mohammad Ghareeb (KUW); Ahmad Al-Rabee (KUW)	1	1
Sultan Al-Alawi (QAT); Abdulla Al-Haji (QAT)	1	1
Aisam-ul-Haq Qureshi (PAK); Aqeel Khan (PAK)	6	6
3	Denis Istomin (UZB); Murad Inoyatov (UZB)	6	6
Baataryn Oyuunbat (MGL); Mönkhbaataryn Badrakh (MGL)	2	2
Chen Ti (TPE); Yi Chu-huan (TPE)	6^{2}	2
5	Cecil Mamiit (PHI); Eric Taino (PHI)	7^{7}	6

Quarterfinals
1	Leander Paes (IND); Mahesh Bhupathi (IND)	6	6
Aisam-ul-Haq Qureshi (PAK); Aqeel Khan (PAK)	2	4
3	Denis Istomin (UZB); Murad Inoyatov (UZB)	6	6^{5}	6^{4}
5	Cecil Mamiit (PHI); Eric Taino (PHI)	3	7^{7}	7^{7}

Semifinals
1	Leander Paes (IND); Mahesh Bhupathi (IND)	6	6
5	Cecil Mamiit (PHI); Eric Taino (PHI)	2	4

=== Bottom half ===
Round of 32
7	Jun Woong-sun (KOR); Kim Sun-yong (KOR)	6	6
Patrick Chucri (LIB); Karim Alayli (LIB)	3	4
Mohammed Al-Shammari (QAT); Abdulla Al-Shammari (QAT)	7	6
Baataryn Oyuunbold (MGL); Sükhbaataryn Sükhjargal (MGL)	5	1
Lee Hsin-han (TPE); Hsieh Wang-cheng (TPE)	6	1	6
Wang Yu (CHN); Li Zhe (CHN)	4	6	3
Abdulrahman Shehab (BRN); Abdullatif Mohamed (BRN)	2	1
4	Mustafa Ghouse (IND); Rohan Bopanna (IND)	6	6
8	Satoshi Iwabuchi (JPN); Takao Suzuki (JPN)	6	6
Abdullah Maqdes (KUW); Ali Al-Sheikh (KUW)	1	1
Đỗ Minh Quân (VIE); Lê Quốc Khánh (VIE)	4	6	6
Asim Shafik (PAK); Nomi Qamar (PAK)	6	2	4
Patrick John Tierro (PHI); Johnny Arcilla (PHI)	7	6
Harshana Godamanna (SRI); Rajeev Rajapakse (SRI)	5	2
Deepesh Chhetri (BHU); Kinley Wangchuk (BHU)	1	0
2	Sanchai Ratiwatana (THA); Sonchat Ratiwatana (THA)	6	6

Round of 16
7	Jun Woong-sun (KOR); Kim Sun-yong (KOR)	6	6
Mohammed Al-Shammari (QAT); Abdulla Al-Shammari (QAT)	1	0
Lee Hsin-han (TPE); Hsieh Wang-cheng (TPE)	1	6^{0}
4	Mustafa Ghouse (IND); Rohan Bopanna (IND)	6	7^{7}
8	Satoshi Iwabuchi (JPN); Takao Suzuki (JPN)	6	6
Đỗ Minh Quân (VIE); Lê Quốc Khánh (VIE)	1	0
Patrick John Tierro (PHI); Johnny Arcilla (PHI)	2	6	2
2	Sanchai Ratiwatana (THA); Sonchat Ratiwatana (THA)	6	4	6

Quarterfinals
7	Jun Woong-sun (KOR); Kim Sun-yong (KOR)	7^{7}	6
4	Mustafa Ghouse (IND); Rohan Bopanna (IND)	6^{2}	1
8	Satoshi Iwabuchi (JPN); Takao Suzuki (JPN)	5	4
2	Sanchai Ratiwatana (THA); Sonchat Ratiwatana (THA)	7	6

Semifinals
7	Jun Woong-sun (KOR); Kim Sun-yong (KOR)	1	3
2	Sanchai Ratiwatana (THA); Sonchat Ratiwatana (THA)	6	6
