= Tennis at the 2006 Asian Games – Mixed doubles =

Mixed doubles at the 2006 Asian Games
- Venue: Khalifa International Tennis and Squash Complex
- Dates: 8–13 December 2006
- Competitors: 44 from 12 nations

Medalists
gold medal	Leander Paes; Sania Mirza	India
silver medal	Satoshi Iwabuchi; Akiko Morigami	Japan
bronze medal	Yu Xinyuan; Sun Tiantian	China
bronze medal	Lu Yen-hsun; Hsieh Su-wei	Chinese Taipei

Mixed doubles
- Tennis at the 2006 Asian Games

Events
Singles	men	women
Doubles	men	women	mixed
Team	men	women
- Asian Games

Mixed doubles at the 2006 Asian Games was won by Sania Mirza and Leander Paes of India.

== Schedule ==
All times are Arabia Standard Time (UTC+03:00)

Date	Time	Event
Friday, 8 December 2006	15:00	Round of 32
Saturday, 9 December 2006	11:00	Round of 16
Sunday, 10 December 2006	16:00	Quarterfinals
Tuesday, 12 December 2006	11:00	Semifinals
Wednesday, 13 December 2006	18:00	Final

== Results ==
=== Final ===
Final
1	Leander Paes (IND); Sania Mirza (IND)	7	5	6
7	Satoshi Iwabuchi (JPN); Akiko Morigami (JPN)	5	7	2

=== Top half ===
Round of 32
Murad Inoyatov (UZB); Dilyara Saidkhodjayeva (UZB)	6^{2}	7	6
Wayne Wong (HKG); Lam Po Kuen (HKG)	7^{7}	5	1
Mirhusein Yakhyaev (TJK); Zarrina Fayzullaeva (TJK)	0	0
Abdulrahman Shehab (BRN); Linda Abu Mushref (BRN)	6	6
Im Kyu-tae (KOR); Kim Mi-ok (KOR)	6	6
Patrick John Tierro (PHI); Czarina Arevalo (PHI)	2	4

Round of 16
1	Leander Paes (IND); Sania Mirza (IND)	6	6
Murad Inoyatov (UZB); Dilyara Saidkhodjayeva (UZB)	1	3
Abdulrahman Shehab (BRN); Linda Abu Mushref (BRN)	3	1
6	Sonchat Ratiwatana (THA); Montinee Tangphong (THA)	6	6
4	Yu Xinyuan (CHN); Sun Tiantian (CHN)	6	6
Im Kyu-tae (KOR); Kim Mi-ok (KOR)	4	1
Toshihide Matsui (JPN); Tomoko Yonemura (JPN)	2	3
8	Jimmy Wang (TPE); Chuang Chia-jung (TPE)	6	6

Quarterfinals
1	Leander Paes (IND); Sania Mirza (IND)	6	6
6	Sonchat Ratiwatana (THA); Montinee Tangphong (THA)	4	3
4	Yu Xinyuan (CHN); Sun Tiantian (CHN)	6	6
8	Jimmy Wang (TPE); Chuang Chia-jung (TPE)	2	4

Semifinals
1	Leander Paes (IND); Sania Mirza (IND)	6	2	6
4	Yu Xinyuan (CHN); Sun Tiantian (CHN)	3	6	1

=== Bottom half ===
Round of 32
Sarvar Ikramov (UZB); Albina Khabibulina (UZB)	6	7
Lê Quốc Khánh (VIE); Huỳnh Mai Huỳnh (VIE)	1	5
Yu Hiu Tung (HKG); Tong Ka-po (HKG)	6	3	2
An Jae-sung (KOR); Kim So-jung (KOR)	3	6	6
Johnny Arcilla (PHI); Denise Dy (PHI)	6	6
Abdullatif Mohamed (BRN); Safa Haji (BRN)	1	0

Round of 16
5	Zeng Shaoxuan (CHN); Yan Zi (CHN)	6	6
Sarvar Ikramov (UZB); Albina Khabibulina (UZB)	1	2
An Jae-sung (KOR); Kim So-jung (KOR)	7	2	3
3	Lu Yen-hsun (TPE); Hsieh Su-wei (TPE)	5	6	6
7	Satoshi Iwabuchi (JPN); Akiko Morigami (JPN)	6	6
Johnny Arcilla (PHI); Denise Dy (PHI)	0	4
Sanchai Ratiwatana (THA); Suchanun Viratprasert (THA)	6	6
2	Mahesh Bhupathi (IND); Shikha Uberoi (IND)	4	4

Quarterfinals
5	Zeng Shaoxuan (CHN); Yan Zi (CHN)	4	3
3	Lu Yen-hsun (TPE); Hsieh Su-wei (TPE)	6	6
7	Satoshi Iwabuchi (JPN); Akiko Morigami (JPN)	6	6
Sanchai Ratiwatana (THA); Suchanun Viratprasert (THA)	4	3

Semifinals
3	Lu Yen-hsun (TPE); Hsieh Su-wei (TPE)	6^{5}	3
7	Satoshi Iwabuchi (JPN); Akiko Morigami (JPN)	7^{7}	6
