= Tennis at the 2006 Asian Games – Men's team =

Men's team at the 2006 Asian Games
- Venue: Khalifa International Tennis and Squash Complex
- Dates: 4–8 December 2006
- Competitors: 63 from 16 nations

Medalists
gold medal	South Korea; An Jae-sung, Chung Hee-seok, Jun Woong-sun, Lee Hyung-taik
silver medal	Japan; Satoshi Iwabuchi, Toshihide Matsui, Go Soeda, Takao Suzuki
bronze medal	Thailand; Sanchai Ratiwatana, Sonchat Ratiwatana, Paradorn Srichaphan, Danai Udomchoke
bronze medal	Chinese Taipei; Chen Ti, Lu Yen-hsun, Jimmy Wang, Yi Chu-huan

Men's team
- Tennis at the 2006 Asian Games

Events
Singles	men	women
Doubles	men	women	mixed
Team	men	women
- Asian Games

The team tennis competition at the 2006 Asian Games was arranged in a 16-team knockout bracket. Each tie consisted of two singles and one doubles match.

South Korea won the men's competition after beating Japan in the final. Thailand and Chinese Taipei both finished third and won bronze medal.

== Schedule ==
All times are Arabia Standard Time (UTC+03:00)

Date	Time	Event
Monday, 4 December 2006	10:00	Round of 16
Tuesday, 5 December 2006	10:00	Quarterfinals
Wednesday, 6 December 2006	10:00	Semifinals
Friday, 8 December 2006	10:00	Final

== Results ==
Round of 16
1	Thailand	2
Sri Lanka	1
Uzbekistan	3
Pakistan	0
4	Japan	2
China	1
Tajikistan	0
Bahrain	3
Mongolia	0
Qatar	3
Hong Kong	0
3	South Korea	3
Kuwait	1
Philippines	2
India	1
2	Chinese Taipei	2

Quarterfinals
1	Thailand	2
Uzbekistan	1
4	Japan	3
Bahrain	0
Qatar	0
3	South Korea	3
Philippines	1
2	Chinese Taipei	2

Semifinals
1	Thailand	1
4	Japan	2
3	South Korea	2
2	Chinese Taipei	1

Final
4	Japan	1
3	South Korea	2

=== Round of 16 ===
4 December	Thailand	2–1	Sri Lanka

Danai Udomchoke	2–0	Rajeev Rajapakse	6–0, 6–2
Sanchai Ratiwatana	1–2	Harshana Godamanna	6–7^{(4–7)}, 6–2, 2–6
Danai Udomchoke / Sonchat Ratiwatana	0–2	Harshana Godamanna / Rajeev Rajapakse	6–0, 6–0

4 December	Uzbekistan	3–0	Pakistan

Murad Inoyatov	2–0	Aqeel Khan	6–3, 6–2
Denis Istomin	2–0	Aisam-ul-Haq Qureshi	6–4, 6–2
Sarvar Ikramov / Murad Inoyatov	2–1	Aisam-ul-Haq Qureshi / Aqeel Khan	4–6, 6–4, 6–2

4 December	Japan	2–1	China

Toshihide Matsui	1–2	Sun Peng	4–6, 6–3, 3–6
Go Soeda	2–0	Wang Yu	6–0, 6–3
Satoshi Iwabuchi / Takao Suzuki	2–0	Yu Xinyuan / Zeng Shaoxuan	7–5, 7–5

4 December	Tajikistan	0–3	Bahrain

Mirhusein Yakhyaev	0–2	Abdulrahman Shehab	3–6, 3–6
Dilshod Sharifi	1–2	Khaled Al-Thawadi	3–6, 6–1, 3–6
Rahmatullo Rajabaliev / Farhod Saidov	0–2	Abdullatif Mohamed / Abdulkarim Abdulreda	1–6, 1–6

4 December	Mongolia	0–3	Qatar

Mönkhbaataryn Badrakh	0–2	Abdulla Al-Haji	3–6, 1–6
Baataryn Oyuunbat	0–2	Sultan Al-Alawi	1–6, 5–7
Baataryn Oyuunbold / Sükhbaataryn Sükhjargal	0–2	Mohammed Al-Shammari / Abdulla Al-Shammari	4–6, 2–6

4 December	Hong Kong	0–3	South Korea

Wayne Wong	0–2	Chung Hee-seok	3–6, 1–6
Yu Hiu Tung	0–2	Lee Hyung-taik	1–6, 1–6
Wayne Wong / Yu Hiu Tung	0–2	Jun Woong-sun / An Jae-sung	1–6, 1–6

4 December	Kuwait	1–2	Philippines

Abdullah Maqdes	1–2	Eric Taino	6–3, 3–6, 2–6
Mohammad Ghareeb	2–0	Cecil Mamiit	7–5, 7–6^{(7–5)}
Mohammad Ghareeb / Abdullah Maqdes	0–2	Cecil Mamiit / Eric Taino	2–6, 2–6

4 December	India	1–2	Chinese Taipei

Karan Rastogi	0–2	Jimmy Wang	1–6, 3–6
Rohan Bopanna	2–1	Lu Yen-hsun	4–6, 7–6^{(7–1)}, 6–4
Leander Paes / Mahesh Bhupathi	0–2	Jimmy Wang / Lu Yen-hsun	2–6, 3–6

=== Quarterfinals ===
5 December	Thailand	2–1	Uzbekistan

Danai Udomchoke	2–0	Murad Inoyatov	6–3, 6–0
Paradorn Srichaphan	0–2	Denis Istomin	3–6, 0–2, Retired
Sanchai Ratiwatana / Sonchat Ratiwatana	2–1	Denis Istomin / Murad Inoyatov	7–6^{(9–7)}, 3–6, 7–6^{(7–2)}

5 December	Japan	3–0	Bahrain

Toshihide Matsui	2–0	Abdulrahman Shehab	6–1, 6–1
Go Soeda	2–0	Khaled Al-Thawadi	6–1, 6–0
Takao Suzuki / Satoshi Iwabuchi	2–0	Abdullatif Mohamed / Abdulkarim Abdulreda	6–0, 6–0

5 December	Qatar	0–3	South Korea

Abdulla Al-Haji	0–2	Jun Woong-sun	1–6, 2–6
Sultan Al-Alawi	0–2	Lee Hyung-taik	1–6, 3–6
Mohammed Al-Shammari / Abdulla Al-Shammari	0–2	Lee Hyung-taik / Jun Woong-sun	0–6, 0–6

5 December	Philippines	1–2	Chinese Taipei

Eric Taino	0–2	Jimmy Wang	2–6, 2–6
Cecil Mamiit	1–2	Lu Yen-hsun	6–2, 3–6, 4–6
Johnny Arcilla / Patrick John Tierro	2–0	Chen Ti / Yi Chu-huan	7–6^{(7–3)}, 6–4

=== Semifinals ===
6 December	Thailand	1–2	Japan

Danai Udomchoke	2–1	Satoshi Iwabuchi	6–4, 6–7^{(5–7)}, 6–2
Paradorn Srichaphan	1–2	Go Soeda	7–6^{(7–2)}, 0–6, 4–6
Sanchai Ratiwatana / Sonchat Ratiwatana	0–2	Takao Suzuki / Satoshi Iwabuchi	3–6, 6–7^{(4–7)}

6 December	South Korea	2–1	Chinese Taipei

Jun Woong-sun	0–2	Jimmy Wang	3–6, 2–6
Lee Hyung-taik	2–0	Lu Yen-hsun	6–4, 6–2
Lee Hyung-taik / Jun Woong-sun	2–1	Lu Yen-hsun / Jimmy Wang	4–6, 6–4, 6–4

=== Final ===
8 December	Japan	1–2	South Korea

Takao Suzuki	2–1	Chung Hee-seok	6–0, 3–6, 6–3
Go Soeda	0–2	Lee Hyung-taik	3–6, 6–7^{(4–7)}
Takao Suzuki / Satoshi Iwabuchi	1–2	Lee Hyung-taik / Jun Woong-sun	2–6, 7–5, 2–6

== Non-participating athletes ==
- Derek Ling (HKG)
- Ahmad Al-Rabee (KUW)
- Ali Al-Sheikh (KUW)
- Nomi Qamar (PAK)
- Asim Shafik (PAK)
- Sankha Atukorale (SRI)
- Dinusha Wijesuriya (SRI)
- Farrukh Dustov (UZB)
