= Tennis at the 2006 Asian Games – Men's singles =

Men's singles at the 2006 Asian Games
- Venue: Khalifa International Tennis and Squash Complex
- Dates: 8–14 December 2006
- Competitors: 38 from 20 nations

Medalists
gold medal	Danai Udomchoke	Thailand
silver medal	Lee Hyung-taik	South Korea
bronze medal	Cecil Mamiit	Philippines
bronze medal	Go Soeda	Japan

Men's singles
- Tennis at the 2006 Asian Games

Events
Singles	men	women
Doubles	men	women	mixed
Team	men	women
- Asian Games

Men's singles at the 2006 Asian Games was won by Danai Udomchoke of Thailand.

== Schedule ==
All times are Arabia Standard Time (UTC+03:00)

Date	Time	Event
Friday, 8 December 2006	10:00	Round of 64
Saturday, 9 December 2006	10:00	Round of 32
Sunday, 10 December 2006	10:00	Round of 16
Monday, 11 December 2006	10:00	Quarterfinals
Tuesday, 12 December 2006	10:00	Semifinals
Thursday, 14 December 2006	15:00	Final

== Results ==
=== Finals ===
Semifinals					Final
1	Lee Hyung-taik (KOR)	7	6
6	Cecil Mamiit (PHI)	5	0		1	Lee Hyung-taik (KOR)	5	3
3	Danai Udomchoke (THA)	6	2	6	3	Danai Udomchoke (THA)	7	6
5	Go Soeda (JPN)	0	6	2

=== Top half ===
==== Section 1 ====
Round of 64
Abdulrahman Shehab (BRN)	2	2
Sultan Al-Alawi (QAT)	6	6

Round of 32
1	Lee Hyung-taik (KOR)	6	6
Karim Alayli (LIB)	1	0
Lei Hou In (MAC)	0	0
Wang Yu (CHN)	6	6
Aisam-ul-Haq Qureshi (PAK)	6	6
Sultan Al-Alawi (QAT)	1	1
Mirhusein Yakhyaev (TJK)	0	1
7	Denis Istomin (UZB)	6	6

Round of 16
1	Lee Hyung-taik (KOR)	6	6
Wang Yu (CHN)	2	0
Aisam-ul-Haq Qureshi (PAK)	4	3
7	Denis Istomin (UZB)	6	6

Quarterfinals
1	Lee Hyung-taik (KOR)	6	7
7	Denis Istomin (UZB)	1	5

==== Section 2 ====
Round of 64
Deepesh Chhetri (BHU)	2	0
Yu Hiu Tung (HKG)	6	6

Round of 32
4	Jimmy Wang (TPE)	6	6
Yu Hiu Tung (HKG)	3	2
Baataryn Oyuunbat (MGL)	0	1
Karan Rastogi (IND)	6	6
Toshihide Matsui (JPN)	7^{7}	4	6
Abdullah Maqdes (KUW)	6^{4}	6	2
Rajeev Rajapakse (SRI)	0	0
6	Cecil Mamiit (PHI)	6	6

Round of 16
4	Jimmy Wang (TPE)	2	7	7
Karan Rastogi (IND)	6	5	5
Toshihide Matsui (JPN)	2	6	1
6	Cecil Mamiit (PHI)	6	3	6

Quarterfinals
4	Jimmy Wang (TPE)	6	2	2
6	Cecil Mamiit (PHI)	2	6	6

=== Bottom half ===
==== Section 3 ====
Round of 64
Khaled Al-Thawadi (BRN)	1	2
Sun Peng (CHN)	6	6
Mönkhbaataryn Badrakh (MGL)	0	0
Wayne Wong (HKG)	6	6

Round of 32
8	Rohan Bopanna (IND)	3	3
Sun Peng (CHN)	6	6
Abdulla Al-Haji (QAT)	0	0
Jun Woong-sun (KOR)	6	6
Aqeel Khan (PAK)	2	2
Wayne Wong (HKG)	6	6
Dilshod Sharifi (TJK)	0	0
3	Danai Udomchoke (THA)	6	6

Round of 16
Sun Peng (CHN)	2	6	1
Jun Woong-sun (KOR)	6	3	6
Wayne Wong (HKG)	1	1
3	Danai Udomchoke (THA)	6	6

Quarterfinals
Jun Woong-sun (KOR)	6^{4}	6	3
3	Danai Udomchoke (THA)	7^{7}	3	6

==== Section 4 ====
Round of 64
Harshana Godamanna (SRI)	2	0
Sarvar Ikramov (UZB)	6	6
Kinley Wangchuk (BHU)	2	2
Edgar Wong (MAC)	6	6

Round of 32
5	Go Soeda (JPN)	7^{7}	7^{10}
Sarvar Ikramov (UZB)	6^{4}	6^{8}
Đỗ Minh Quân (VIE)	2	4
Mohammad Ghareeb (KUW)	6	6
Eric Taino (PHI)	6	6
Edgar Wong (MAC)	1	0
Patrick Chucri (LIB)	1	2
2	Lu Yen-hsun (TPE)	6	6

Round of 16
5	Go Soeda (JPN)	6	6
Mohammad Ghareeb (KUW)	2	1
Eric Taino (PHI)	6^{1}	2
2	Lu Yen-hsun (TPE)	7^{7}	6

Quarterfinals
5	Go Soeda (JPN)	4	6	6
2	Lu Yen-hsun (TPE)	6	2	1
