= Tennis at the 2006 Asian Games – Women's team =

Women's team at the 2006 Asian Games
- Venue: Khalifa International Tennis and Squash Complex
- Dates: 4–8 December 2006
- Competitors: 41 from 11 nations

Medalists
gold medal	Chinese Taipei; Chan Chin-wei, Latisha Chan, Chuang Chia-jung, Hsieh Su-wei
silver medal	India; Ankita Bhambri, Isha Lakhani, Sania Mirza, Shikha Uberoi
bronze medal	Uzbekistan; Akgul Amanmuradova, Albina Khabibulina, Dilyara Saidkhodjayeva, Iroda Tulyaganova
bronze medal	Japan; Ryoko Fuda, Akiko Morigami, Aiko Nakamura, Tomoko Yonemura

Women's team
- Tennis at the 2006 Asian Games

Events
Singles	men	women
Doubles	men	women	mixed
Team	men	women
- Asian Games

The women's team tennis event was part of the tennis programme and took place between October 2 and 5, at the Khalifa International Tennis and Squash Complex.

Chinese Taipei won the gold after beating the Indian women's team in the final, India finished second, Japan and Uzbekistan won bronze medals.

The first seed China lost to Uzbekistan in the first round.

== Schedule ==
All times are Arabia Standard Time (UTC+03:00)

Date	Time	Event
Monday, 4 December 2006	15:00	Round of 16
Tuesday, 5 December 2006	10:00	Quarterfinals
Wednesday, 6 December 2006	14:00	Semifinals
Friday, 8 December 2006	20:00	Final

== Results ==
Round of 16
Uzbekistan	2
Indonesia	1
Thailand	3
Bahrain	0
South Korea	3
Hong Kong	0

Quarterfinals
1	China	0
Uzbekistan	2
4	India	2
Thailand	1
Kuwait	0
3	Chinese Taipei	3
South Korea	0
2	Japan	3

Semifinals
Uzbekistan	0
4	India	2
3	Chinese Taipei	2
2	Japan	0

Final
4	India	1
3	Chinese Taipei	2

=== Round of 16 ===
4 December	Uzbekistan	2–1	Indonesia

Akgul Amanmuradova	2–0	Romana Tedjakusuma	6–4, 6–3
Iroda Tulyaganova	2–1	Sandy Gumulya	6–1, 4–6, 6–2
Dilyara Saidkhodjayeva / Albina Khabibulina	0–2	Romana Tedjakusuma / Lavinia Tananta	6–7^{(3–7)}, 5–7

4 December	Thailand	3–0	Bahrain

Suchanun Viratprasert	2–0	Linda Abu Mushref	6–2, 6–1
Tamarine Tanasugarn	2–0	Safa Haji	6–0, 6–0
Suchanun Viratprasert / Montinee Tangphong	2–0	Linda Abu Mushref / Safa Haji	6–1, 6–1

4 December	South Korea	3–0	Hong Kong

Kim So-jung	2–0	Lam Po Kuen	6–0, 6–1
Yoo Mi	2–0	Venise Chan	6–3, 6–1
Kim So-jung / Kim Mi-ok	2–0	Lam Po Kuen / Tong Ka Po	6–1, 6–3

=== Quarterfinals ===
5 December	China	0–2	Uzbekistan

Zheng Jie	1–2	Akgul Amanmuradova	3–6, 6–3, 6–7^{(4–7)}
Li Na	1–2	Iroda Tulyaganova	4–6, 6–1, 1–6

5 December	India	2–1	Thailand

Shikha Uberoi	2–0	Suchanun Viratprasert	6–3, 6–4
Sania Mirza	2–0	Tamarine Tanasugarn	6–3, 6–3
Ankita Bhambri / Isha Lakhani	0–2	Suchanun Viratprasert / Montinee Tangphong	4–6, 3–6

5 December	Kuwait	0–3	Chinese Taipei

Danah Al-Felaij	0–2	Hsieh Su-wei	1–6, 0–6
Manar Al-Jazaf	0–2	Latisha Chan	0–6, 0–6
Danah Al-Felaij / Manar Al-Jazaf	0–2	Chuang Chia-jung / Latisha Chan	0–6, 0–6

5 December	South Korea	0–3	Japan

Kim So-jung	0–2	Akiko Morigami	1–6, 3–6
Yoo Mi	0–2	Aiko Nakamura	3–6, 2–6
Lee Ye-ra / Kim Mi-ok	0–2	Ryoko Fuda / Tomoko Yonemura	1–4, Retired

=== Semifinals ===
6 December	Uzbekistan	0–2	India

Akgul Amanmuradova	1–2	Shikha Uberoi	6–7^{(7–9)}, 6–4, 3–6
Iroda Tulyaganova	0–2	Sania Mirza	3–6, 0–6

6 December	Chinese Taipei	2–0	Japan

Hsieh Su-wei	2–1	Akiko Morigami	3–6, 6–3, 6–0
Latisha Chan	2–0	Aiko Nakamura	6–4, 7–5

=== Final ===
8 December	India	1–2	Chinese Taipei

Shikha Uberoi	0–2	Hsieh Su-wei	2–6, 5–7
Sania Mirza	2–0	Latisha Chan	6–2, 6–2
Sania Mirza / Shikha Uberoi	0–2	Chuang Chia-jung / Hsieh Su-wei	6–7^{(2–7)}, 1–6

== Non-participating athletes ==
- Sarah Al-Zayani (BRN)
- Peng Shuai (CHN)
- Yan Zi (CHN)
- Angelique Widjaja (INA)
- Asrar Abdulmajid (KUW)
- Sarah Behbehani (KUW)
- Chan Chin-wei (TPE)
