= Tennis at the 2006 Asian Games – Women's doubles =

Women's doubles at the 2006 Asian Games
- Venue: Khalifa International Tennis and Squash Complex
- Dates: 8–14 December 2006
- Competitors: 40 from 12 nations

Medalists
gold medal	Zheng Jie; Yan Zi	China
silver medal	Latisha Chan; Chuang Chia-jung	Chinese Taipei
bronze medal	Ryoko Fuda; Tomoko Yonemura	Japan
bronze medal	Li Ting; Sun Tiantian	China

Women's doubles
- Tennis at the 2006 Asian Games

Events
Singles	men	women
Doubles	men	women	mixed
Team	men	women
- Asian Games

Women's doubles at the 2006 Asian Games was won by Yan Zi and Zheng Jie of the People's Republic of China.

== Schedule ==
All times are Arabia Standard Time (UTC+03:00)

Date	Time	Event
Friday, 8 December 2006	10:00	Round of 32
Saturday, 9 December 2006	12:00	Round of 32
Saturday, 9 December 2006	12:00	Round of 16
Sunday, 10 December 2006	12:00	Round of 16
Monday, 11 December 2006	13:00	Quarterfinals
Tuesday, 12 December 2006	12:00	Semifinals
Thursday, 14 December 2006	13:00	Final

== Results ==
=== Final ===
Final
1	Zheng Jie (CHN); Yan Zi (CHN)	6	7^{7}
4	Latisha Chan (TPE); Chuang Chia-jung (TPE)	1	6^{5}

=== Top half ===
Round of 32
Sandy Gumulya (INA); Lavinia Tananta (INA)	6	6
Manar Al-Jazaf (KUW); Danah Al-Felaij (KUW)	0	0
Ryoko Fuda (JPN); Tomoko Yonemura (JPN)	6	6
Linda Abu Mushref (BRN); Safa Haji (BRN)	0	0

Round of 16
1	Zheng Jie (CHN); Yan Zi (CHN)	6	6
Sandy Gumulya (INA); Lavinia Tananta (INA)	1	0
Kim So-jung (KOR); Kim Mi-ok (KOR)	4	6	2
5	Hsieh Su-wei (TPE); Chan Chin-wei (TPE)	6	4	6
3	Sania Mirza (IND); Shikha Uberoi (IND)	3	6^{6}
Ryoko Fuda (JPN); Tomoko Yonemura (JPN)	6	7^{8}
Tong Ka-po (HKG); Lam Po Kuen (HKG)	3	7	4
8	Iroda Tulyaganova (UZB); Akgul Amanmuradova (UZB)	6	5	6

Quarterfinals
1	Zheng Jie (CHN); Yan Zi (CHN)	7	4	6
5	Hsieh Su-wei (TPE); Chan Chin-wei (TPE)	5	6	1
Ryoko Fuda (JPN); Tomoko Yonemura (JPN)	6	6
8	Iroda Tulyaganova (UZB); Akgul Amanmuradova (UZB)	4	3

Semifinals
1	Zheng Jie (CHN); Yan Zi (CHN)	6	6
Ryoko Fuda (JPN); Tomoko Yonemura (JPN)	2	2

=== Bottom half ===
Round of 32
Dilyara Saidkhodjayeva (UZB); Albina Khabibulina (UZB)	6	6
Asrar Abdulmajid (KUW); Sarah Behbehani (KUW)	0	0
Huỳnh Mai Huỳnh (VIE); Ngô Việt Hà (VIE)	3	3
Ankita Bhambri (IND); Rushmi Chakravarthi (IND)	6	6

Round of 16
6	Romana Tedjakusuma (INA); Angelique Widjaja (INA)	6	6
Dilyara Saidkhodjayeva (UZB); Albina Khabibulina (UZB)	2	1
Czarina Arevalo (PHI); Denise Dy (PHI)	6^{6}	3
4	Latisha Chan (TPE); Chuang Chia-jung (TPE)	7^{8}	6
7	Akiko Morigami (JPN); Aiko Nakamura (JPN)	6	6
Ankita Bhambri (IND); Rushmi Chakravarthi (IND)	3	4
Yoo Mi (KOR); Lee Jin-a (KOR)	6^{3}	2
2	Li Ting (CHN); Sun Tiantian (CHN)	7^{7}	6

Quarterfinals
6	Romana Tedjakusuma (INA); Angelique Widjaja (INA)	4	4
4	Latisha Chan (TPE); Chuang Chia-jung (TPE)	6	6
7	Akiko Morigami (JPN); Aiko Nakamura (JPN)	3	1
2	Li Ting (CHN); Sun Tiantian (CHN)	6	6

Semifinals
4	Latisha Chan (TPE); Chuang Chia-jung (TPE)	6	6
2	Li Ting (CHN); Sun Tiantian (CHN)	3	2
