= Tennis at the 2006 Asian Games =

- Venue: Khalifa International Tennis and Squash Complex
- Dates: 4–14 December 2006
- Competitors: 130 from 22 nations

Tennis were contested at the 2006 Asian Games in Doha, Qatar from December 4 to December 14, 2006. Tennis had team, doubles, and singles events for men and women, as well as a mixed doubles competition.

The tennis competition was held at the Khalifa International Tennis and Squash Complex. India finished first in the medal table for the first time with two gold medals.

== Schedule ==
P	Preliminary rounds	¼	Quarterfinals	½	Semifinals	F	Final

Event↓/Date →	4th Mon	5th Tue	6th Wed	7th Thu	8th Fri	9th Sat	10th Sun	11th Mon	12th Tue	13th Wed	14th Thu
Men's singles					P	P	P	¼	½		F
Men's doubles					P	P	P	¼	½	F	
Men's team	P	¼	½		F						
Women's singles					P	P	P	¼	½	F	
Women's doubles					P	P	P	¼	½		F
Women's team	P	¼	½		F						
Mixed doubles					P	P	¼		½	F	

== Medalists ==
Event	Gold	Silver	Bronze
Men's singles	Danai Udomchoke; Thailand	Lee Hyung-taik; South Korea	Cecil Mamiit; Philippines
Men's singles	Danai Udomchoke; Thailand	Lee Hyung-taik; South Korea	Go Soeda; Japan
Men's doubles	India; Leander Paes; Mahesh Bhupathi	Thailand; Sanchai Ratiwatana; Sonchat Ratiwatana	Philippines; Cecil Mamiit; Eric Taino
Men's doubles	India; Leander Paes; Mahesh Bhupathi	Thailand; Sanchai Ratiwatana; Sonchat Ratiwatana	South Korea; Jun Woong-sun; Kim Sun-yong
Men's team	South Korea; An Jae-sung; Chung Hee-seok; Jun Woong-sun; Lee Hyung-taik	Japan; Satoshi Iwabuchi; Toshihide Matsui; Go Soeda; Takao Suzuki	Thailand; Sanchai Ratiwatana; Sonchat Ratiwatana; Paradorn Srichaphan; Danai Udomchoke
Men's team	South Korea; An Jae-sung; Chung Hee-seok; Jun Woong-sun; Lee Hyung-taik	Japan; Satoshi Iwabuchi; Toshihide Matsui; Go Soeda; Takao Suzuki	Chinese Taipei; Chen Ti; Lu Yen-hsun; Jimmy Wang; Yi Chu-huan
Women's singles	Zheng Jie; China	Sania Mirza; India	Li Na; China
Women's singles	Zheng Jie; China	Sania Mirza; India	Aiko Nakamura; Japan
Women's doubles	China; Zheng Jie; Yan Zi	Chinese Taipei; Latisha Chan; Chuang Chia-jung	Japan; Ryoko Fuda; Tomoko Yonemura
Women's doubles	China; Zheng Jie; Yan Zi	Chinese Taipei; Latisha Chan; Chuang Chia-jung	China; Li Ting; Sun Tiantian
Women's team	Chinese Taipei; Chan Chin-wei; Latisha Chan; Chuang Chia-jung; Hsieh Su-wei	India; Ankita Bhambri; Isha Lakhani; Sania Mirza; Shikha Uberoi	Uzbekistan; Akgul Amanmuradova; Albina Khabibulina; Dilyara Saidkhodjayeva; Iroda Tulyaganova
Women's team	Chinese Taipei; Chan Chin-wei; Latisha Chan; Chuang Chia-jung; Hsieh Su-wei	India; Ankita Bhambri; Isha Lakhani; Sania Mirza; Shikha Uberoi	Japan; Ryoko Fuda; Akiko Morigami; Aiko Nakamura; Tomoko Yonemura
Mixed doubles	India; Leander Paes; Sania Mirza	Japan; Satoshi Iwabuchi; Akiko Morigami	China; Yu Xinyuan; Sun Tiantian
Mixed doubles	India; Leander Paes; Sania Mirza	Japan; Satoshi Iwabuchi; Akiko Morigami	Chinese Taipei; Lu Yen-hsun; Hsieh Su-wei

== Medal table ==
Rank	Nation	Gold	Silver	Bronze	Total
1	India (IND)	2	2	0	4
2	China (CHN)	2	0	3	5
3	Chinese Taipei (TPE)	1	1	2	4
4	South Korea (KOR)	1	1	1	3
4	Thailand (THA)	1	1	1	3
6	Japan (JPN)	0	2	4	6
7	Philippines (PHI)	0	0	2	2
8	Uzbekistan (UZB)	0	0	1	1
Totals (8 entries)		7	7	14	28

== Participating nations ==
A total of 130 athletes from 22 nations competed in tennis at the 2006 Asian Games:

- Bahrain (7)
- Bhutan (2)
- China (11)
- Chinese Taipei (10)
- Hong Kong (6)
- India (10)
- Indonesia (4)
- Japan (8)
- Kuwait (8)
- Kyrgyzstan (1)
- Lebanon (2)
- Macau (2)
- Mongolia (4)
- Pakistan (4)
- Philippines (6)
- Qatar (4)
- South Korea (12)
- Sri Lanka (4)
- Tajikistan (5)
- Thailand (7)
- Uzbekistan (8)
- Vietnam (5)
