= Tennis at the 2006 Asian Games – Women's singles =

Women's singles at the 2006 Asian Games
- Venue: Khalifa International Tennis and Squash Complex
- Dates: 8–13 December 2006
- Competitors: 28 from 15 nations

Medalists
gold medal	Zheng Jie	China
silver medal	Sania Mirza	India
bronze medal	Li Na	China
bronze medal	Aiko Nakamura	Japan

Women's singles
- Tennis at the 2006 Asian Games

Events
Singles	men	women
Doubles	men	women	mixed
Team	men	women
- Asian Games

Women's singles at the 2006 Asian Games was won by Zheng Jie of the People's Republic of China.

== Schedule ==
All times are Arabia Standard Time (UTC+03:00)

Date	Time	Event
Friday, 8 December 2006	10:00	Round of 32
Saturday, 9 December 2006	12:00	Round of 32
Sunday, 10 December 2006	10:00	Round of 16
Monday, 11 December 2006	10:00	Quarterfinals
Tuesday, 12 December 2006	11:00	Semifinals
Wednesday, 13 December 2006	11:00	Final

== Results ==
Legend

- r — Retired
- WO — Won by walkover

=== Final ===
Final
4	Sania Mirza (IND)	4	6	1
2	Zheng Jie (CHN)	6	1	6

=== Top half ===
Round of 32
Chan Chin-wei (TPE)	6	1	2^{r}
Sandy Gumulya (INA)	3	6	3
Nguyễn Thùy Dung (VIE)	6	1	4
Czarina Arevalo (PHI)	2	6	6
Bermet Duvanaeva (KGZ)	1	0
8	Iroda Tulyaganova (UZB)	6	6
Safa Haji (BRN)	0	0
Yoo Mi (KOR)	6	6
Lam Po Kuen (HKG)	6	6
Asrar Abdulmajid (KUW)	0	0
Suchanun Viratprasert (THA)	W	O
7	Akiko Morigami (JPN)

Round of 16
1	Li Na (CHN)	6	6
Sandy Gumulya (INA)	1	3
Czarina Arevalo (PHI)	1	1
8	Iroda Tulyaganova (UZB)	6	6
4	Sania Mirza (IND)	6	6
Yoo Mi (KOR)	1	4
Lam Po Kuen (HKG)	2	1
Suchanun Viratprasert (THA)	6	6

Quarterfinals
1	Li Na (CHN)	3	7	6
8	Iroda Tulyaganova (UZB)	6	5	2
4	Sania Mirza (IND)	6	6
Suchanun Viratprasert (THA)	3	2

Semifinals
1	Li Na (CHN)	2	2
4	Sania Mirza (IND)	6	6

=== Bottom half ===
Round of 32
5	Tamarine Tanasugarn (THA)	6	6
Akgul Amanmuradova (UZB)	4	4
Zarrina Fayzullaeva (TJK)	1	0
Denise Dy (PHI)	6	6
Kim Jin-hee (KOR)	4	6	6
Venise Chan (HKG)	6	1	2
6	Latisha Chan (TPE)	6	6
Romana Tedjakusuma (INA)	2	2
Manar Al-Jazaf (KUW)	1	1
Ngô Việt Hà (VIE)	6	6
Shikha Uberoi (IND)	6	6^{5}	7
Linda Abu Mushref (BRN)	3	7^{7}	5

Round of 16
5	Tamarine Tanasugarn (THA)	6	7
Denise Dy (PHI)	4	5
Kim Jin-hee (KOR)	2	2
3	Aiko Nakamura (JPN)	6	6
6	Latisha Chan (TPE)	6	6
Ngô Việt Hà (VIE)	1	1
Shikha Uberoi (IND)	0^{r}
2	Zheng Jie (CHN)	4

Quarterfinals
5	Tamarine Tanasugarn (THA)	6	3	1^{r}
3	Aiko Nakamura (JPN)	3	6	4
6	Latisha Chan (TPE)	6	4	2
2	Zheng Jie (CHN)	3	6	6

Semifinals
3	Aiko Nakamura (JPN)	3	2
2	Zheng Jie (CHN)	6	6
