= Tennis at the 2007 Summer Universiade =

- Edition: 13
- Location: National Tennis Development Center, Bangkok

Champions

Men's singles
- Danai Udomchoke (THA)

Women's singles
- Alisa Kleybanova (RUS)

Men's doubles
- Sanchai Ratiwatana / Sonchat Ratiwatana (THA)

Women's doubles
- Chan Chin-wei / Chuang Chia-jung (TPE)

Mixed doubles
- Eva Hrdinová / Pavel Šnobel (CZE)
- Summer Universiade

Tennis events were contested at the 2007 Summer Universiade in Bangkok, Thailand.

== Medal summary ==
Event	Gold	Silver	Bronze
Men's singles	Danai Udomchoke (THA)	An Jae-sung (KOR)	Charles-Antoine Brézac (FRA)
Men's singles	Danai Udomchoke (THA)	An Jae-sung (KOR)	Chen Ti (TPE)
Men's doubles	Sanchai Ratiwatana and Sonchat Ratiwatana (THA)	Pavel Chekhov and Alexandre Krasnoroutskiy (RUS)	Prima Simpatiaji and Sunu Wahyu Trijati (INA)
Men's doubles	Sanchai Ratiwatana and Sonchat Ratiwatana (THA)	Pavel Chekhov and Alexandre Krasnoroutskiy (RUS)	An Jae-sung and Kim Sun-yong (KOR)
Women's singles	Alisa Kleybanova (RUS)	Margit Rüütel (EST)	Chan Chin-wei (TPE)
Women's singles	Alisa Kleybanova (RUS)	Margit Rüütel (EST)	Sandy Gumulya (INA)
Women's doubles	Chan Chin-wei and Chuang Chia-jung (TPE)	Amina Rakhim and Madina Rakhim (KAZ)	Ivana Abramović and Maria Abramović (CRO)
Women's doubles	Chan Chin-wei and Chuang Chia-jung (TPE)	Amina Rakhim and Madina Rakhim (KAZ)	Lee Jin-a and Yoo Mi (KOR)
Mixed doubles	Eva Hrdinová and Pavel Šnobel (CZE)	Alisa Kleybanova and Alexandre Krasnoroutskiy (RUS)	Ivana Abramović and Ivan Cerović (CRO)
Mixed doubles	Eva Hrdinová and Pavel Šnobel (CZE)	Alisa Kleybanova and Alexandre Krasnoroutskiy (RUS)	Chuang Chia-jung and Chen Ti (TPE)

== Medal table ==
Rank	Nation	Gold	Silver	Bronze	Total
1	Thailand (THA)	2	0	0	2
2	Russia (RUS)	1	2	0	3
3	Chinese Taipei (TPE)	1	0	3	4
4	Czech Republic (CZE)	1	0	0	1
5	South Korea (KOR)	0	1	2	3
6	Estonia (EST)	0	1	0	1
6	Kazakhstan (KAZ)	0	1	0	1
8	Croatia (CRO)	0	0	2	2
8	Indonesia (INA)	0	0	2	2
10	France (FRA)	0	0	1	1
Totals (10 entries)		5	5	10	20

== See also ==
- Tennis at the Summer Universiade
