= Chen Ti =

Taiwanese tennis player

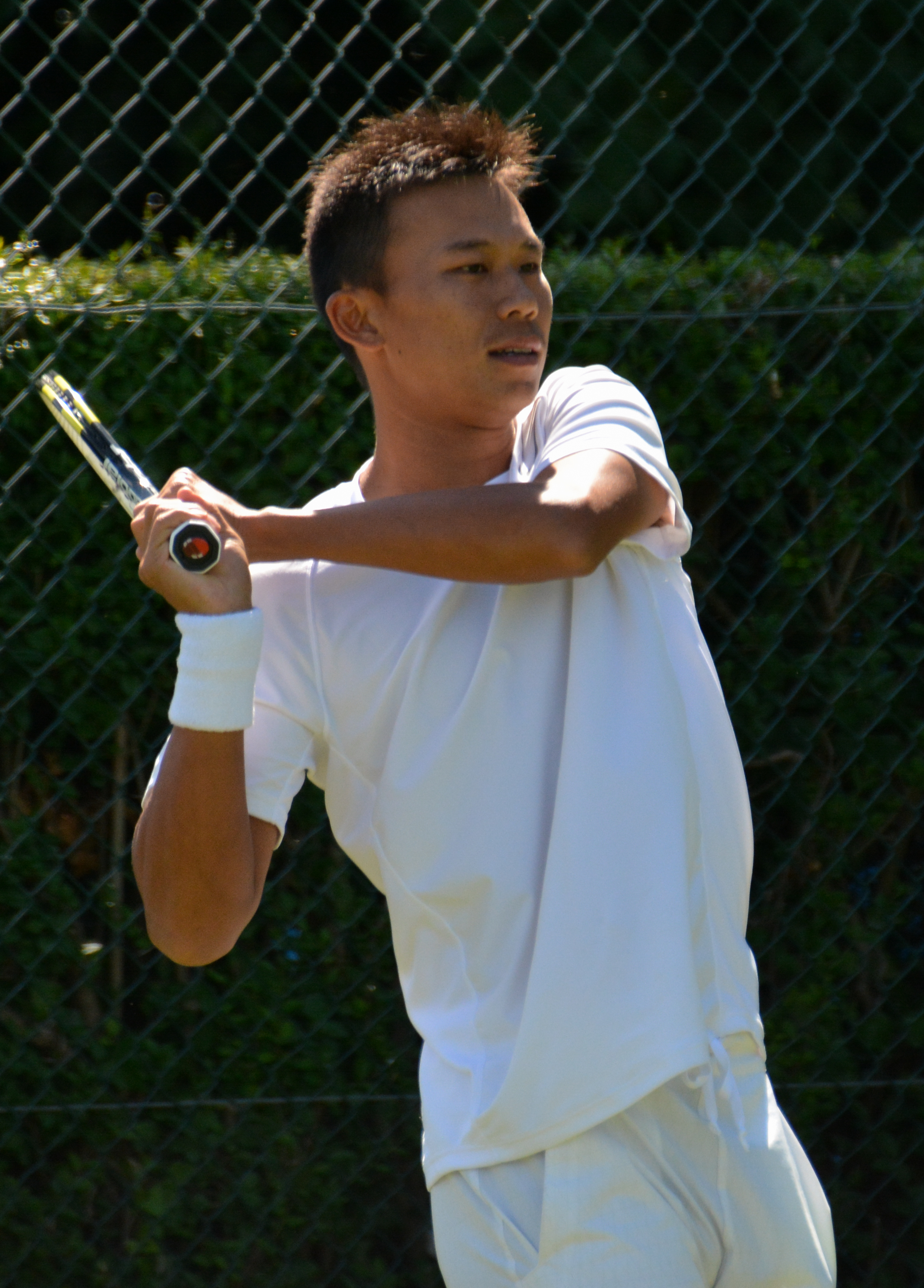
- Country (sports): Chinese Taipei
- Residence: Taiwan
- Born: 3 October 1983 (age 42) Keelung, Taiwan
- Height: 1.83 m (6 ft 0 in)
- Turned pro: 2002
- Retired: 2019 (last match played)
- Plays: Right-handed (two-handed backhand)
- Prize money: US$488,025

Singles
- Career record: 15–20
- Career titles: 0
- Highest ranking: No. 184 (14 September 2015)

Grand Slam singles results
- Australian Open: Q3 (2008)
- French Open: Q1 (2013, 2017)
- Wimbledon: Q2 (2008, 2017)
- US Open: Q1 (2005, 2008, 2012, 2015)

Doubles
- Career record: 3–5
- Career titles: 0
- Highest ranking: No. 119 (28 July 2014)
Medal record
Representing Chinese Taipei
Men's Tennis
Asian Games
Bronze medal – third place	2006 Doha	Men's Team
Gold medal – first place	2010 Guangzhou	Men's Team
Universiade
Gold medal – first place	2005 Izmir	Mixed doubles
Bronze medal – third place	2007 Bangkok	Men's singles
Bronze medal – third place	2007 Bangkok	Mixed doubles
- Last updated on: 20 October 2025.

Chen Ti
- Traditional Chinese: 陳迪
- Simplified Chinese: 陈迪
Transcriptions
Standard Mandarin
- Hanyu Pinyin: Chén Dí

Chen Ti (Chinese: 陳迪; born 3 October 1983) is a Taiwanese former professional tennis player. He competed mainly on the ATP Challenger Tour and ITF Futures, both in singles and doubles. He was part of the Chinese Taipei Davis Cup team.

== Career ==
In singles, all of Chen's appearances in a final of a tournament have come at the ITF Tour level, where he has a record of 23 wins and 23 losses. The time from when he won his first title to when he won his most recent title spanned 15 years, from September 2003 to July 2018.

In 2005, Chen qualified for his first main draw at the ATP Tour level, at the 2005 Thailand Open defeating Tatsushi Fakuda and Nathan Healey in qualifying before being eliminated in the first round by Paradorn Srichaphan of Thailand, 3–6, 4–6. He has since made 2 other singles main draw appearances; the 2006 Tokyo tournament defeating Takahiro Ittogi and Lars Burgsmüller in qualifying before losing to Japan's Satoshi Iwabuchi in the first round 2–6, 1–6, and the 2007 Mumbai tournament where he defeated Tushar Liberhan and Leoš Friedl in qualifying before losing to Australia's Lleyton Hewitt in the first round 3–6, 3–6. He has yet to win a singles main draw match other than in Davis Cup play.

In June 2012, Chen reached the finals of Toyota Bangalore Open ITF tournament, losing to Vishnu Vardhan, 6–2, 4–6, 6–1.

Im doubles, Chen has won 6 ATP Challenger Tour titles and 25 on the ITF Futures Tour. In total, he has a doubles finals record of 31 wins and 29 losses. Other than Davis Cup matches, Chen has played made 2 main doubles draw appearances At the ATP Tour level, at the 2008 Cincinnati Masters partnering with Phillip King where they lost to John Isner and Mardy Fish 4–6, 6–7^{(2–7)}, and secondly at the 2015 Shenzhen Open partnering Austin Krajicek where they lost to Chris Guccione and André Sá 1–6, 5–7.

In Davis Cup matches playing for Chinese Taipei, Chen has a singles record of 15–17, and a doubles record of 3–3.

== Grand Slams ==
Chen has competed in the qualifying rounds of a Grand Slam tournament on 18 occasions, none of which saw him advance through to the main draw. His best result was reaching the 3rd and final round of qualifying at the 2008 Australian Open.

== Performance timeline ==
Key
W	F	SF	QF	#R	RR	Q#	DNQ	A	NH

(W) winner; (F) finalist; (SF) semifinalist; (QF) quarterfinalist; (#R) rounds 4, 3, 2, 1; (RR) round-robin stage; (Q#) qualification round; (DNQ) did not qualify; (A) absent; (NH) not held; (SR) strike rate (events won / competed); (W–L) win–loss record.
To avoid confusion and double counting, these charts are updated at the conclusion of a tournament or when the player's participation has ended.

=== Singles ===
Tournament	2005	2006	2007	2008	2009–11	2012	2013	2014	2015	2016	2017	2018–19	SR	W–L
Grand Slam tournaments
Australian Open	Q1	A	A	Q3	A	A	Q2	A	Q1	Q1	A	A	0 / 0	0–0
French Open	A	A	A	A	A	A	Q1	A	A	A	Q1	A	0 / 0	0–0
Wimbledon	Q1	A	Q1	Q2	A	A	Q1	A	Q1	Q1	Q2	A	0 / 0	0–0
US Open	Q1	A	A	Q1	A	Q1	A	A	Q1	A	A	A	0 / 0	0–0
Win–loss	0–0	0–0	0–0	0–0	0–0	0–0	0–0	0–0	0–0	0–0	0–0	0–0	0 / 0	0–0
ATP Tour Masters 1000
Canadian Open	A	A	A	Q2	A	A	Q2	A	A	A	A	A	0 / 0	0–0
Cincinnati Masters	A	A	A	Q1	A	A	A	A	A	A	A	A	0 / 0	0–0

== ATP Challenger and ITF Futures finals ==
=== Singles: 46 (23–23) ===
Legend ATP Challenger (0–1) ITF Futures (23–22)	Finals by surface Hard (23–22) Clay (0–1) Grass (0–0) Carpet (0–0)

Result	W–L	Date	Tournament	Tier	Surface	Opponent	Score
Loss	0–1	Sep 2003	Indonesia F2, Jakarta	Futures	Hard	(Chinese Taipei) Jimmy Wang	6–7^{(4–7)}, 4–6
Loss	0–2	Sep 2004	Japan F2, Kashiwa	Futures	Hard	(Japan) Satoshi Iwabuchi	4–6, 2–6
Loss	0–3	Oct 2004	USA F30, Baton Rouge	Futures	Hard	(South Africa) Justin Bower	7–6^{(8–6)}, 4–6, 4–6
Win	1–3	Feb 2005	Australia F1, Wollongong	Futures	Hard	(Australia) Todd Reid	6–3, 6–0
Win	2–3	Jul 2005	China F5, Beijing	Futures	Hard	(South Korea) Oh-Hee Kwon	3–6, 6–1, 6–1
Loss	2–4	Jul 2006	Penza, Russia	Challenger	Hard	(Uzbekistan) Farrukh Dustov	7–5, 2–6, 4–6
Loss	2–5	Aug 2006	Thailand F4, Bangkok	Futures	Hard	(South Korea) Hee-Seok Chung	4–6, 0–6
Loss	2–6	Feb 2007	Australia F2, Sydney	Futures	Hard	(Finland) Timo Nieminen	5–7, 4–6
Loss	2–7	Apr 2007	Japan F2, Tokyo	Futures	Hard	(South Korea) Kyu-Tae Im	6–7^{(5–7)}, 6–7^{(2–7)}
Loss	2–8	Mar 2008	Japan F1, Tokyo	Futures	Hard	(Japan) Tatsuma Ito	2–6, 4–6
Win	3–8	Sep 2008	Thailand F4, Khon Kaen	Futures	Hard	(Japan) Tasuku Iwami	6–1, 6–0
Win	4–8	Sep 2008	Thailand F5, Bangkok	Futures	Hard	(United States) Nathan Thompson	6–2, 6–4
Win	5–8	Jul 2009	Malaysia F3, Kuala Lumpur	Futures	Hard	(Italy) Luigi D'Agord	7–5, 6–4
Win	6–8	Jul 2009	Korea F5, Gyeongsan	Futures	Hard	(Chinese Taipei) Yang Tsung-hua	6–2, 6–2
Loss	6–9	Oct 2010	Japan F9, Kashiwa	Futures	Hard	(Thailand) Danai Udomchoke	4–6, 2–6
Loss	6–10	Apr 2011	Thailand F1, Khon Kaen	Futures	Hard	(Thailand) Danai Udomchoke	0–6, 2–6
Win	7–10	Apr 2011	China F3, Chengdu	Futures	Hard	(South Korea) Lim Yong-kyu	3–6, 6–1, 6–4
Win	8–10	May 2011	China F5, Nanjing	Futures	Hard	(China) Chuhan Wang	6–2, 1–0 ret.
Loss	8–11	Nov 2011	Chinese Taipei F4, Tainan	Futures	Clay	(Russia) Victor Baluda	7–6^{(8–6)}, 3–6, 5–7
Win	9–11	Apr 2012	Vietnam F3, Ho Chi Minh City	Futures	Hard	(France) Kevin Botti	7–5, 6–2
Loss	9–12	May 2012	China F8, Fuzhou	Futures	Hard	(China) Di Wu	1–6, 2–6
Loss	9–13	Jun 2012	India F9, Bangalore	Futures	Hard	(India) Vishnu Vardhan	2–6, 6–4, 1–6
Loss	9–14	Jul 2012	Indonesia F2, Jakarta	Futures	Hard	(Japan) Yūichi Sugita	2–6, 5–7
Loss	9–15	Jul 2012	Kazakhstan F7, Astana	Futures	Hard	(Belarus) Dzmitry Zhyrmont	1–6, 4–6
Loss	9–16	Sep 2012	Kuwait F2, Meshref	Futures	Hard	(Kuwait) Mohammed Ghareeb	7–5, 6–7^{(6–8)}, 2–6
Win	10–16	Oct 2012	Kuwait F3, Meshref	Futures	Hard	(Kuwait) Abdullah Maqdes	6–3, 6–1
Win	11–16	Mar 2013	Israel F6, Netanya	Futures	Hard	(Austria) Maximilian Neuchrist	6–4, 6–3
Win	12–16	Jul 2013	Spain F20, Bakio	Futures	Hard	(Spain) Carlos Boluda-Purkiss	6–3, 6–3
Win	13–16	Dec 2013	Cambodia F3, Phnom Penh	Futures	Hard	(Japan) Toshihide Matsui	6–3, 6–4
Win	14–16	Jul 2014	Thailand F8, Bangkok	Futures	Hard	(Japan) Kento Takeuchi	6–4, 6–1
Win	15–16	Jul 2014	Thailand F9, Bangkok	Futures	Hard	(Australia) Dayne Kelly	6–4, 6–1
Loss	15–17	Aug 2014	Kazakhstan F10, Astana	Futures	Hard	(Ukraine) Denys Molchanov	3–6, 4–6
Win	16–17	Jun 2015	Hong Kong F1	Futures	Hard	(United States) Alexander Sarkissian	4–1 ret.
Loss	16–18	Aug 2015	Thailand F6, Bangkok	Futures	Hard	(Australia) Jordan Thompson	2–6, 2–6
Loss	16–19	Aug 2015	Thailand F7, Bangkok	Futures	Hard	(Australia) Jordan Thompson	0–6, 6–3, 2–6
Loss	16–20	Dec 2015	Cambodia F3, Phnom Penh	Futures	Hard	(South Korea) Kim Cheong-Eui	3–6, 4–6
Loss	16–21	May 2016	Uzbekistan F3, Andijan	Futures	Hard	(Uzbekistan) Temur Ismailov	6–2, 5–7, 5–7
Win	17–21	Jun 2016	Uzbekistan F4, Namangan	Futures	Hard	(Russia) Markos Kalovelonis	6–4, 6–2
Loss	17–22	Jul 2016	Korea F4, Gimcheon	Futures	Hard	(Japan) Makoto Ochi	6–2, 0–6, 1–6
Win	18–22	Aug 2016	Thailand F1, Hua Hin	Futures	Hard	(China) Fajing Sun	6–3, 6–1
Win	19–22	Oct 2016	Vietnam F6, Thủ Dầu Một	Futures	Hard	(Japan) Makoto Ochi	6–0, 6–0
Win	20–22	Feb 2017	Indonesia F1, Jakarta	Futures	Hard	(China) Fajing Sun	7–6^{(7–4)}, 6–3
Win	21–22	Apr 2017	Indonesia F5, Jakarta	Futures	Hard	(United Kingdom) Brydan Klein	3–6, 7–6^{(7–2)}, 6–3
Win	22–22	Apr 2017	Indonesia F6, Jakarta	Futures	Hard	(Australia) Max Purcell	6–3, 6–4
Win	23–22	Jun 2017	Thailand F2, Hua Hin	Futures	Hard	(Australia) Dayne Kelly	6–3, 4–6, 6–4
Loss	23–23	Jul 2018	Chinese Taipei F2, Taiwan	Futures	Hard	(Chinese Taipei) Tseng Chun Hsin	1–6, 7–6^{(7–5)}, 6–7^{(1–7)}

=== Doubles: 60 (31–29) ===
Legend ATP Challenger (6–11) ITF Futures (25–18)	Finals by surface Hard (29–29) Clay (2–0) Grass (0–0) Carpet (0–0)

Result	W–L	Date	Tournament	Tier	Surface	Partner	Opponents	Score
Win	1–0	Oct 2004	USA F29, Arlington	Futures	Hard	(Japan) Go Soeda	(United States) Scott Lipsky (United States) Todd Widom	7–5, 6–2
Loss	1–1	Nov 2004	China F1, Jiangmen	Futures	Hard	(United States) Shuon Madden	(Italy) Flavio Cipolla (Italy) Alessandro Motti	6–7^{(4–7)}, 1–6
Loss	1–2	Jun 2005	Spain F13, Lanzarote	Futures	Hard	(Chinese Taipei) Jimmy Wang	(Togo) Komlavi Loglo (Spain) Rafael Moreno-Negrin	5–7, 7–6^{(10–8)}, 4–6
Loss	1–3	May 2007	Uzbekistan F2, Namangan	Futures	Hard	(Chinese Taipei) Jimmy Wang	(Czech Republic) Lukáš Rosol (Austria) Martin Slanar	2–6, 6–3, 1–6
Win	2–3	Oct 2007	China F6, Beijing	Futures	Hard	(United States) Phillip King	(China) Xin-Yuan Yu (China) Shao-Xuan Zeng	7–5, 3–6, [10–7]
Win	3–3	Nov 2007	Caloundra, Australia	Challenger	Hard	(South Korea) Woong-Sun Jun	(Croatia) Ivan Cerović (Croatia) Vjekoslav Skenderovic	6–2, 6–3
Win	4–3	May 2008	Uzbekistan F2, Namangan	Futures	Hard	(Germany) Sebastian Rieschick	(Ukraine) Sergey Bubka (Ukraine) Vladyslav Klymenko	7–5, 5–7, [10–5]
Loss	4–4	Jul 2008	Winnetka, United States	Challenger	Hard	(Australia) José Statham	(United States) Todd Widom (United States) Michael Yani	2–6, 2–6
Loss	4–5	Sep 2008	Thailand F4, Khon Kaen	Futures	Hard	(Australia) Mikal Statham	(China) Gao Wan (China) Xin-Yuan Yu	5–7, 7–6^{(10–8)}, [7–10]
Loss	4–6	Nov 2008	Toyota, Japan	Challenger	Hard	(Poland) Grzegorz Panfil	(Denmark) Frederik Nielsen (Pakistan) Aisam Qureshi	5–7, 3–6
Loss	4–7	Mar 2009	Melbourne, Australia	Challenger	Hard	(Thailand) Danai Udomchoke	(Thailand) Sanchai Ratiwatana (Thailand) Sonchat Ratiwatana	6–7^{(5–7)}, 7–5, [7–10]
Loss	4–8	Jun 2009	Malaysia F2, Petaling Jaya	Futures	Hard	(United States) Phillip King	(Spain) Arnau Brugués Davi (Italy) Luigi D'Agord	2–6, 3–6
Win	5–8	Jul 2009	Korea F5, Gyeongsan	Futures	Hard	(Chinese Taipei) Yang Tsung-hua	(Japan) Satoshi Iwabuchi (Japan) Gouichi Motomura	7–6^{(7–4)}, 6–4
Loss	5–9	Jul 2009	Korea F6, Gyeongsan	Futures	Hard	(Japan) Satoshi Iwabuchi	(Chinese Taipei) Yang Tsung-hua (Chinese Taipei) Lee Hsin-han	6–7^{(4–7)}, 7–5, [8–10]
Win	6–9	Mar 2010	USA F7, McAllen	Futures	Hard	(Georgia (country)) Nikoloz Basilashvili	(Australia) Jared Easton (Australia) Matheson Klein	7–5, 4–6, [10–4]
Loss	6–10	Apr 2011	China F3, Chengdu	Futures	Hard	(China) Xu Junchao	(China) Zhe Li (China) Mao-Xin Gong	0–6, 3–6
Win	7–10	May 2011	Korea F2, Changwon	Futures	Hard	(Japan) Hiroki Kondo	(South Korea) Lim Yong-kyu (South Korea) Im Kyu-Tae	6–4, 6–2
Win	8–10	May 2012	Israel F8, Ramat HaSharon	Futures	Hard	(New Zealand) Marcus Daniell	(Israel) Noam Behr (Israel) Noam Okun	7–6^{(7–1)}, ret.
Win	9–10	May 2012	Israel F9, Ramat HaSharon	Futures	Hard	(New Zealand) Marcus Daniell	(Israel) Aviv Ben Shabat (Israel) Noam Okun	6–0, 6–2
Win	10–10	Feb 2013	Turkey F6, Antalya	Futures	Hard	(Japan) Hiroki Kondo	(China) Yu Chang (China) Zhe Li	6–0, 6–2
Win	11–10	Mar 2013	Turkey F8, Antalya	Futures	Hard	(China) Gao Wan	(Czech Republic) Michal Konecny (Slovakia) Michal Pazicky	7–6^{(7–3)}, 6–3
Win	12–10	Mar 2013	Israel F6, Netanya	Futures	Hard	(Austria) Maximilian Neuchrist	(France) Jérôme Inzerillo (France) Alexis Musialek	7–5, 6–3
Win	13–10	Apr 2013	Uzbekistan F1, Namangan	Futures	Hard	(Serbia) Marek Semjan	(Belarus) Sergey Betov (Belarus) Dzmitry Zhyrmont	6–2, 7–6^{(7–3)}
Win	14–10	May 2013	Qarshi, Uzbekistan	Challenger	Hard	(Spain) Guillermo Olaso	(Australia) Jordan Kerr (Russia) Konstantin Kravchuk	7–6^{(7–5)}, 7–5
Win	15–10	Aug 2013	Chinese Taipei F1, Taipei	Futures	Hard	(Chinese Taipei) Huang Liang-chi	(Japan) Hiroki Kondo (Japan) Yuichi Ito	6–1, 6–1
Win	16–10	Sep 2013	Bangkok, Thailand	Challenger	Hard	(Chinese Taipei) Huang Liang-chi	(South Korea) Ji Sung Nam (South Korea) Suk-Young Jeong	6–3, 6–2
Win	17–10	Dec 2013	Turkey F51, Istanbul	Futures	Hard	(Russia) Stanislav Vovk	(Turkey) Tuna Altuna (Turkey) Baris Erguden	6–2, 6–1
Loss	17–11	Mar 2014	China F2, Guangzhou	Futures	Hard	(South Africa) Ruan Roelofse	(Italy) Riccardo Ghedin (Italy) Claudio Grassi	4–6, 1–6
Win	18–11	Apr 2014	Qatar F2, Doha	Futures	Hard	(South Africa) Ruan Roelofse	(United Kingdom) Luke Bambridge (France) Antoine Benneteau	6–4, 6–3
Win	19–11	Apr 2014	Qatar F3, Doha	Futures	Hard	(South Africa) Ruan Roelofse	(United Kingdom) Oliver Golding (United Kingdom) Joshua Ward-Hibbert	6–1, 6–1
Win	20–11	Jun 2014	Nanchang, China	Challenger	Hard	(Chinese Taipei) Peng Hsien-Yin	(Australia) Jordan Kerr (France) Fabrice Martin	6–2, 3–6, [12–10]
Loss	20–12	Jul 2014	Thailand F9, Bangkok	Futures	Hard	(South Africa) Ruan Roelofse	(Thailand) Pruchya Isaro (Thailand) Nuttanon Kadchapanan	4–6, 1–6
Loss	20–13	Jul 2014	Kaohsiung, Taiwan	Challenger	Hard	(Chinese Taipei) Huang Liang-chi	(Chinese Taipei) Peng Hsien-Yin (China) Mao-Xin Gong	3–6, 2–6
Loss	20–14	Jul 2014	Astana, Kazakhstan	Challenger	Hard	(Chinese Taipei) Huang Liang-chi	(Ukraine) Sergey Bubka (Switzerland) Marco Chiudinelli	3–6, 4–6
Win	21–14	Aug 2014	Kazakhstan F11, Astana	Futures	Hard	(Russia) Denis Matsukevich	(India) N.Sriram Balaji (India) Ranjeet Virali-Murugesan	6–2, 6–3
Loss	21–15	Aug 2014	Chinese Taipei F1, Kaohsiung	Futures	Hard	(Chinese Taipei) Huang Liang-chi	(Japan) Arata Onozawa (Japan) Takao Suzuki	6–7^{(3–7)}, 3–6
Loss	21–16	Aug 2014	Bangkok, Thailand	Challenger	Hard	(Chinese Taipei) Peng Hsien-Yin	(Thailand) Pruchya Isaro (Thailand) Nuttanon Kadchapanan	4–6, 4–6
Loss	21–17	Feb 2015	Egypt F4, Sharm El Sheikh	Futures	Hard	(Italy) Stefano Travaglia	(Serbia) Ivan Bjelica (Croatia) Matija Pecotić	3–6, 2–6
Loss	21–18	May 2015	Turkey F19, Antalya	Futures	Hard	(Italy) Francesco Vilardo	(Italy) Erik Crepaldi (France) Hugo Grenier	4–6, 3–6
Loss	21–19	May 2015	Eskişehir, Turkey	Challenger	Hard	(South Africa) Ruan Roelofse	(Belarus) Sergey Betov (Russia) Mikhail Elgin	4–6, 7–6^{(7–2)}, [7–10]
Loss	21–20	Jul 2015	China F10, Xi'an	Futures	Hard	(China) Yan Bai	(India) N.Sriram Balaji (China) Zhe Li	6–4, 6–7^{(2–7)}, [11–13]
Loss	21–21	Sep 2015	Bangkok, Thailand	Challenger	Hard	(China) Zhe Li	(Italy) Riccardo Ghedin (China) Yan Bai	2–6, 5–7
Loss	21–22	Nov 2015	Kobe, Japan	Challenger	Hard	(Croatia) Franko Škugor	(Thailand) Sonchat Ratiwatana (Thailand) Sanchai Ratiwatana	4–6, 6–2, [9–11]
Loss	21–23	Dec 2015	Thailand F9, Bangkok	Futures	Hard	(United States) Connor Smith	(Thailand) Pruchya Isaro (Thailand) Nuttanon Kadchapanan	3–6, 6–7^{(4–7)}
Win	22–23	Apr 2016	Uzbekistan F1, Qarshi	Futures	Hard	(India) Sumit Nagal	(Uzbekistan) Sanjar Fayziev (Uzbekistan) Jurabek Karimov	5–5 ret.
Win	23–23	May 2016	Bangkok, Thailand	Challenger	Hard	(Chinese Taipei) Jason Jung	(South Africa) Ruan Roelofse (South Africa) Dean O'Brien	6–4, 3–6, [10–8]
Loss	23–24	Jun 2016	Uzbekistan F4, Namangan	Futures	Hard	(Russia) Denis Matsukevich	(Kazakhstan) Timur Khabibulin (Belarus) Yaraslav Shyla	3–6, 3–6
Win	24–24	Aug 2016	Thailand F1, Hua Hin	Futures	Hard	(United States) John Paul Fruttero	(South Korea) Yunseong Chung (China) Xin Gao	6–2, 6–2
Win	25–24	Oct 2016	Vietnam F6, Thủ Dầu Một	Futures	Hard	(Chinese Taipei) Hung Jui-Chen	(Chinese Taipei) Chiu Yu Hsiang (Japan) Ken Onishi	4–6, 6–1, [11–9]
Win	26–24	Nov 2016	Vietnam F9, Thủ Dầu Một	Futures	Hard	(Vietnam) Nam Hoang Ly	(South Korea) Ju-Hae Moon (South Korea) Sang-Woo Noh	6–2, 4–6, [10–5]
Loss	26–25	Mar 2017	Egypt F8, Sharm El Sheikh	Futures	Hard	(Russia) Fajing Sun	(Philippines) Francis Casey Alcantara (Zimbabwe) Benjamin Lock	3–6, 7–6^{(9–7)}, [7–10]
Loss	26–26	Sep 2017	Zhangjiagang, China	Challenger	Hard	(Chinese Taipei) Yi Chu-Huan	(China) Xin Gao (China) Zhizhen Zhang	2–6, 3–6
Win	27–26	Sep 2017	Gwangju, South Korea	Challenger	Hard	(Japan) Ben McLachlan	(Australia) Jarryd Chaplin (Australia) Luke Saville	2–6, 7–6^{(7–1)}, [10–1]
Win	28–26	Oct 2017	Thailand F9, Pattaya	Futures	Hard	(Australia) Max Purcell	(Hong Kong) Skyler Butts (China) Yuanfeng Li	6–1, 6–1
Win	29–26	Dec 2017	Hong Kong F4	Futures	Hard	(Portugal) Gonçalo Oliveira	(Japan) Shintaro Imai (South Korea) Cheong-Eui Kim	4–6, 7–5, [10–8]
Loss	29–27	May 2018	Seoul, South Korea	Challenger	Hard	(Chinese Taipei) Yi Chu-Huan	(Japan) Toshihide Matsui (Denmark) Frederik Nielsen	4–6, 6–7^{(3–7)}
Loss	29–28	Jul 2018	China F10, Shenzhen	Futures	Hard	(Australia) Rubin Statham	(South Korea) Ji Sung Nam (South Korea) Min-Kyu Song	6–7^{(3–7)}, 2–6
Loss	29–29	Nov 2018	Thailand F9, Nonthaburi	Futures	Hard	(Japan) Sora Fakuta	(Thailand) Pruchya Isaro (South Korea) Min-Kyu Song	3–6, 6–4, [11–13]
Win	30–29	Jan 2019	M15 Anning, China	World Tennis Tour	Clay	(Chinese Taipei) Ray Ho	(India) Anirudh Chandrasekar (India) N. Vijay Sundar Prashanth	6–4, 7–6^{(10–8)}
Win	31–29	Jan 2019	M15 Anning, China	World Tennis Tour	Clay	(Chinese Taipei) Ray Ho	(Chinese Taipei) Lee Kuan-Yi (Hong Kong) Hong Kit Wong	6–4, 3–6, [10–8]
