= An Jae-sung =

South Korean tennis player

- Born: 28 May 1985 (age 41); Suncheon, South Korea
- Education: Konkuk University

Korean name
- Hangul: 안재성
- RR: An Jaeseong
- MR: An Chaesŏng
- Tennis career
- Country (sports): South Korea
- Plays: Right-handed
- Prize money: $77,609

Singles
- Career record: 3–2
- Career titles: 0
- Highest ranking: No. 289 (14 April 2008)

Doubles
- Career record: 1–1
- Career titles: 0
- Highest ranking: No. 454 (18 August 2008)
- Last updated on: 28 March 2018.

An Jae-sung (born 28 May 1985) is a retired South Korean tennis player.

An has a career high ATP singles ranking of 289 achieved on 14 April 2008. He also has a career high doubles ranking of 454 achieved on 18 August 2008.

== Early life and career ==
An attended Konkuk University. While a student, he represented South Korea in tennis at the 2006 Asian Games in Doha, Qatar, where he and his teammates won a gold medal in the men's team event, thus securing an exemption from his mandatory military service.

An has been a member of the South Korea Davis Cup team from 2005 until 2008, competing in the World Group first round tie in 2008 against Germany.

In 2008, he captured his only ATP Challenger Tour doubles title in Moncton, Canada.

He retired in 2014, and now runs a tennis academy in Jeju.

== ATP Challenger and ITF Futures finals ==
=== Singles: 11 (3–8) ===
ATP Challenger (0–1)
ITF Futures (3–7)

| Result | W–L | Date | Tournament | Tier | Surface | Opponent | Score |
|---|---|---|---|---|---|---|---|
| Loss | 0–1 | Jun 2005 | Karuizawa, Japan | Futures | Clay | (South Korea) Kwon Oh-hee | 2–6, 5–7 |
| Loss | 0–2 | Apr 2007 | Kōfu, Japan | Futures | Carpet | (South Korea) Kwon Hyung-tae | 5–7, 1–6 |
| Win | 1–2 | Apr 2007 | Seogwipo, South Korea | Futures | Hard | (Japan) Norikazu Sugiyama | 3–6, 6–3, 6–2 |
| Win | 2–2 | Jun 2007 | Khon Kaen, Thailand | Futures | Hard | (New Zealand) Simon Rea | 6–4, 6–1 |
| Loss | 2–3 | Jun 2007 | Chiang Mai, Thailand | Futures | Hard | (United States) Justin Diao Natale | 4–6, 4–6 |
| Loss | 0–1 | Dec 2007 | New Delhi, India | Challenger | Hard | (Pakistan) Aisam-ul-Haq Qureshi | 5–7, 4–6 |
| Loss | 2–4 | Mar 2008 | Nishitōkyō, Japan | Futures | Hard | (Japan) Gouichi Motomura | 7–5, 1–6, 2–6 |
| Win | 3–4 | Apr 2009 | Kōfu, Japan | Futures | Hard | (Japan) Yūichi Sugita | 5–7, 6–4, 7–6^{(7–5)} |
| Loss | 3–5 | Jun 2010 | Tarakan, Indonesia | Futures | Hard (i) | (Indonesia) Christopher Rungkat | 3–6, 6–0, 2–6 |
| Loss | 3–6 | Jun 2011 | Shenzhen, China | Futures | Hard | (China) Zhang Ze | 4–6, 2–6 |
| Loss | 3–7 | Jun 2011 | Taipei, Taiwan | Futures | Hard | (Japan) Hiroki Moriya | 3–6, 6–4, 3–6 |

=== Doubles: 17 (9–8) ===
ATP Challenger (1–0)
ITF Futures (8–8)

| Result | W–L | Date | Tournament | Tier | Surface | Partner | Opponents | Score |
|---|---|---|---|---|---|---|---|---|
| Loss | 0–1 | May 2004 | Seogwipo, South Korea | Futures | Hard | (South Korea) Im Kyu-tae | (South Korea) Kim Dong-hyun (South Korea) Kwon Oh-hee | 6–7^{(2–7)}, 2–6 |
| Win | 1–1 | Mar 2006 | Andong, South Korea | Futures | Hard | (South Korea) Chung Hee-seok | (South Korea) Jun Woong-sun (South Korea) Kim Sun-yong | 7–5, 6–4 |
| Win | 2–1 | Mar 2006 | Andong, South Korea | Futures | Hard | (South Korea) Kwon Hyung-tae | (South Korea) Im Kyu-tae (Japan) Takahiro Terachi | 3–6, 4–6 |
| Loss | 2–2 | Jun 2006 | Kusatsu, Japan | Futures | Carpet | (South Korea) Kim Dong-hyun | (Japan) Yaoki Ishii (Japan) Joji Miyao | 6–3, 4–6, 2–6 |
| Loss | 2–3 | Aug 2006 | Bangkok, Thailand | Futures | Hard | (South Korea) Chung Hee-seok | (China) Yu Xinyuan (China) Zeng Shaoxuan | 2–6, 7–5, 4–6 |
| Loss | 2–4 | Aug 2006 | Nonthaburi, Thailand | Futures | Hard | (South Korea) Chung Hee-seok | (China) Yu Xinyuan (China) Zeng Shaoxuan | 2–6, 6–4, 2–6 |
| Loss | 2–5 | Apr 2007 | Kōfu, Japan | Futures | Carpet | (South Korea) Daniel Yoo | (Japan) Akito Higa (Japan) Tomohiro Shinokawa | 6–3, 4–6, 4–6 |
| Loss | 2–6 | May 2007 | Gimcheon, South Korea | Futures | Hard | (South Korea) Chung Hee-seok | (Spain) Óscar Burrieza (Russia) Nikolai Nesterov | 6–1, 7–5 |
| Win | 1–0 | Jul 2008 | Moncton, Canada | Challenger | Hard | (Japan) Hiroki Kondo | (Canada) Daniel Chu (Canada) Adil Shamasdin | 6–2, 2–6, [12–10] |
| Win | 3–6 | Apr 2010 | Seogwipo, South Korea | Futures | Hard | (South Korea) Lee Chul-hee | (France) Gary Lugassy (France) Ludovic Walter | 7–6^{(9–7)}, 7–5 |
| Win | 4–6 | May 2010 | Gimcheon, South Korea | Futures | Hard | (South Korea) Lim Yong-kyu | (Japan) Junn Mitsuhashi (Chinese Taipei) Yi Chu-huan | 7–6^{(7–4)}, 6–4 |
| Win | 5–6 | Jun 2010 | Bandung, Indonesia | Futures | Hard (i) | (South Korea) Kim Young-jun | (Indonesia) Elbert Sie (India) Karunuday Singh | 6–2, 5–7, [10–8] |
| Win | 6–6 | Nov 2006 | Daegu, South Korea | Futures | Hard | (South Korea) Kim Young-jun | (Germany) Jaan-Frederik Brunken (United States) Michael McClune | 5–7, 7–5, [10–4] |
| Loss | 6–7 | Sep 2011 | Cairns, Australia | Futures | Hard | (Indonesia) Elbert Sie | (Australia) Brydan Klein (Australia) James Lemke | w/o |
| Loss | 6–8 | Apr 2012 | Kaohsiung, Taiwan | Futures | Hard | (South Korea) Kim Young-jun | (Russia) Denis Matsukevich (Denmark) Frederik Nielsen | 4–6, 1–6 |
| Win | 7–8 | Oct 2012 | Ōarai, Japan | Futures | Hard | (Japan) Arata Onozawa | (Japan) Toshihide Matsui (Chinese Taipei) Yi Chu-huan | 2–6, 6–1, [10–6] |
| Win | 8–8 | May 2013 | Seoul, South Korea | Futures | Hard | (South Korea) Lim Yong-kyu | (South Korea) Chung Hyeon (South Korea) Nam Ji-sung | 6–3, 6–2 |
