= Chuang Chia-jung =

Taiwanese tennis player

Chuang Chia-jung 莊佳容
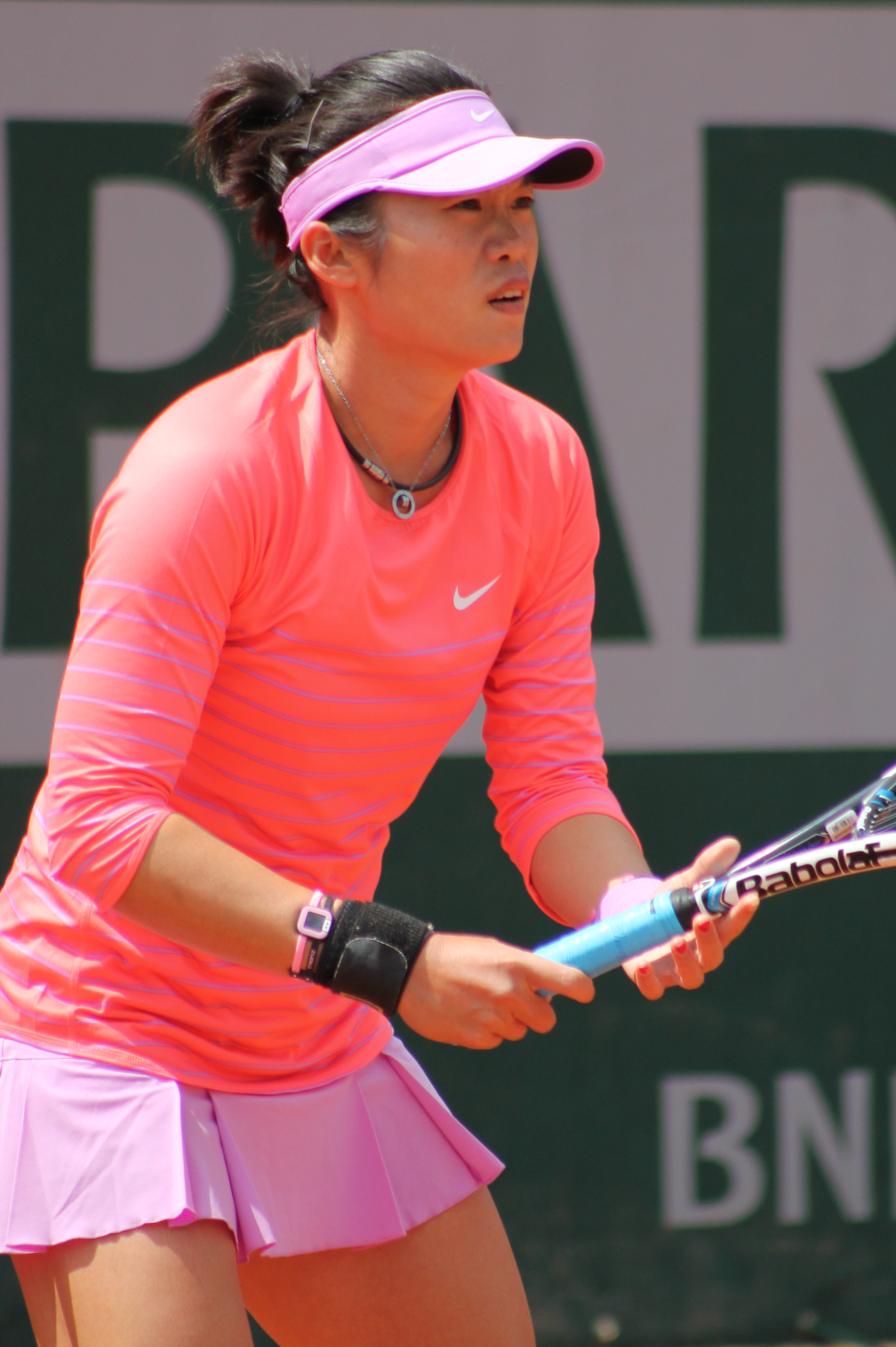
- Chuang at the 2015 French Open
- Country (sports): Chinese Taipei
- Residence: Kaohsiung, Taiwan
- Born: 10 January 1985 (age 41) Kaohsiung
- Height: 1.68 m (5 ft 6 in)
- Turned pro: 2001
- Retired: 28 October 2018
- Plays: Right-handed (two-handed backhand)
- Prize money: US$1,636,548

Singles
- Career record: 184–107
- Career titles: 10 ITF
- Highest ranking: No. 177 (13 November 2006)

Grand Slam singles results
- Australian Open: 1R (2004)

Doubles
- Career record: 487–255
- Career titles: 22 WTA, 3 WTA Challenger
- Highest ranking: No. 5 (18 August 2008)

Grand Slam doubles results
- Australian Open: F (2007)
- French Open: QF (2007, 2008)
- Wimbledon: 3R (2007)
- US Open: F (2007)

Grand Slam mixed doubles results
- Australian Open: QF (2008, 2010, 2011)
- French Open: QF (2007)
- Wimbledon: QF (2008)
- US Open: 2R (2007)

Team competitions
- Fed Cup: 26–11
Medal record
Representing Chinese Taipei
Women's tennis
Asian Games
Gold medal – first place	2006 Doha	Women's team
Gold medal – first place	2010 Guangzhou	Women's doubles
Silver medal – second place	2006 Doha	Women's doubles
Silver medal – second place	2010 Guangzhou	Women's team
Bronze medal – third place	2002 Busan	Women's team
Universiade
Gold medal – first place	2009 Belgrade	Mixed doubles
Gold medal – first place	2007 Bangkok	Women's doubles
Gold medal – first place	2005 Izmir	Women's doubles
Gold medal – first place	2005 Izmir	Mixed doubles
Gold medal – first place	2003 Daegu	Women's doubles
Bronze medal – third place	2007 Bangkok	Mixed doubles

Chuang Chia-jung (Chinese: 莊佳容; pinyin: Zhuāng Jiāróng; Taiwanese Mandarin: [tswáŋ.tɕjá zʊ̌ŋ]; born 10 January 1985) is a Taiwanese former tennis player.

In her career, she won 22 doubles titles on the WTA Tour and three doubles titles on tournaments of the WTA Challenger Tour, as well as ten singles and 33 doubles titles on the ITF Circuit. On 13 November 2006, she reached a career-high singles ranking of world No. 177. On 18 August 2008, she peaked at No. 5 in the WTA doubles rankings.

On 28 October 2018, Chuang announced her retirement from pro tour and her marriage via Instagram.

== Career ==
At the 2007 Australian Open, Chuang reached the final of the women's doubles tournament with her partner Chan Yung-jan that they lost in three sets to Cara Black and Liezel Huber. She also reached the women's doubles final of the 2007 US Open.

In 2001, Chuang played for the first time for the Chinese Taipei Fed Cup team. Her win–loss record in Fed Cup is 26–11.

== Biography ==
Chuang was coached by her father Chuang Wen-teng. Her mother Xie Xiu-ling is a pharmacist. Chuang's favorite surface is hardcourt, and her best shot is her serve. She started playing tennis at age seven when introduced to it by her father. She speaks Mandarin, English, and Taiwanese.

== Grand Slam finals ==
=== Doubles: 2 (runner-ups) ===
Result	Year	Championship	Surface	Partner	Opponents	Score
Loss	2007	Australian Open	Hard	(Chinese Taipei) Chan Yung-jan	(Zimbabwe) Cara Black (South Africa) Liezel Huber	4–6, 7–6^{(7–4)}, 1–6
Loss	2007	US Open	Hard	(Chinese Taipei) Chan Yung-jan	(France) Nathalie Dechy (Russia) Dinara Safina	4–6, 2–6

== Grand Slam performance timelines ==
Key
W	F	SF	QF	#R	RR	Q#	DNQ	A	NH

(W) winner; (F) finalist; (SF) semifinalist; (QF) quarterfinalist; (#R) rounds 4, 3, 2, 1; (RR) round-robin stage; (Q#) qualification round; (DNQ) did not qualify; (A) absent; (NH) not held; (SR) strike rate (events won / competed); (W–L) win–loss record.

=== Doubles ===
Tournament	2005	2006	2007	2008	2009	2010	2011	2012	2013	2014	2015	2016	2017	W–L
Australian Open	3R	1R	F	3R	1R	2R	QF	1R	A	1R	1R	1R	1R	13–12
French Open	A	A	QF	QF	2R	1R	1R	2R	A	A	2R	1R	1R	9–9
Wimbledon	A	A	3R	1R	2R	2R	1R	1R	A	A	1R	1R	2R	5–9
US Open	2R	A	F	1R	1R	2R	1R	QF	A	A	2R	1R	2R	12–10
Win–loss	3–2	0–1	15–4	5–4	2–4	3–4	3–4	4–4	0–0	0–1	2–4	0–4	2–4	39–40

=== Mixed doubles ===
Tournament	2007	2008	2009	2010	2011	2016	W–L
Australian Open	A	QF	2R	QF	QF	A	7–4
French Open	QF	1R	1R	1R	2R	2R	4–6
Wimbledon	3R	QF	2R	1R	1R	2R	5–6
US Open	2R	1R	1R	A	A	A	1–3
Win–loss	5–3	4–4	2–4	2–3	3–3	1–2	17–19

== WTA Tour finals ==
=== Doubles: 36 (22 titles, 14 runner-ups) ===
Before 2009	Starting in 2009
Grand Slam tournaments (0–2)
Tier I (1–1)	Premier M (1–0)
Tier II (2–1)	Premier 5 (0–0)
Tier III (3–2)	Premier (3–2)
Tier IV & V (4–4)	International (8–2)

Result	No.	Date	Tournament	Surface	Partner	Opponents	Score
Loss	1.	3 October 2004	Korea Open	Hard	(Chinese Taipei) Hsieh Su-wei	(South Korea) Cho Yoon-jeong (South Korea) Jeon Mi-ra	3–6, 6–1, 5–7
Win	1.	2 October 2005	Korea Open	Hard	(Chinese Taipei) Chan Yung-jan	(United States) Jill Craybas (South Africa) Natalie Grandin	6–2, 6–4
Loss	2.	1 October 2006	Korea Open	Hard	(Argentina) Mariana Díaz Oliva	(Spain) Virginia Ruano Pascual (Argentina) Paola Suárez	2–6, 3–6
Loss	3.	8 October 2006	Japan Open	Hard	(Chinese Taipei) Chan Yung-jan	(United States) Vania King (Croatia) Jelena Kostanić Tošić	6–7^{(2)}, 7–5, 2–6
Loss	4.	27 January 2007	Australian Open	Hard	(Chinese Taipei) Chan Yung-jan	(Zimbabwe) Cara Black (South Africa) Liezel Huber	4–6, 7–6^{(4)}, 1–6
Loss	5.	11 February 2007	Pattaya Open, Thailand	Hard	(Chinese Taipei) Chan Yung-jan	(Australia) Nicole Pratt (Italy) Mara Santangelo	4–6, 6–7^{(4)}
Win	2.	18 February 2007	Bangalore Open, India	Hard	(Chinese Taipei) Chan Yung-jan	(Chinese Taipei) Hsieh Su-wei (Russia) Alla Kudryavtseva	6–7^{(4)}, 6–2, [11–9]
Loss	6.	18 March 2007	Indian Wells Open, U.S.	Hard	(Chinese Taipei) Chan Yung-jan	(United States) Lisa Raymond (Australia) Samantha Stosur	3–6, 5–7
Win	3.	17 June 2007	Birmingham Classic, UK	Grass	(Chinese Taipei) Chan Yung-jan	(China) Sun Tiantian (United States) Meilen Tu	7–6^{(3)}, 6–3
Win	4.	23 June 2007	Rosmalen Open, Netherlands	Grass	(Chinese Taipei) Chan Yung-jan	(Spain) Anabel Medina Garrigues (Spain) Virginia Ruano Pascual	7–5, 6–2
Loss	7.	9 September 2007	US Open	Hard	(Chinese Taipei) Chan Yung-jan	(France) Nathalie Dechy (Russia) Dinara Safina	4–6, 2–6
Win	5.	23 September 2007	China Open	Hard	(Chinese Taipei) Hsieh Su-wei	(China) Han Xinyun (China) Xu Yifan	7–6^{(2)}, 6–3
Win	6.	30 September 2007	Korea Open	Hard	(Chinese Taipei) Hsieh Su-wei	(Greece) Eleni Daniilidou (Germany) Jasmin Wöhr	6–2, 6–2
Loss	8.	7 October 2007	Japan Open	Hard	(United States) Vania King	(China) Sun Tiantian (China) Yan Zi	6–1, 2–6, [6–10]
Win	7.	10 February 2008	Pattaya Open, Thailand	Hard	(Chinese Taipei) Chan Yung-jan	(Chinese Taipei) Hsieh Su-wei (United States) Vania King	6–4, 6–3
Loss	9.	9 March 2008	Bangalore Open, India	Hard	(Chinese Taipei) Chan Yung-jan	(China) Peng Shuai (China) Sun Tiantian	4–6, 7–5, [8–10]
Win	8.	18 May 2008	Italian Open	Clay	(Chinese Taipei) Chan Yung-jan	(Czech Republic) Iveta Benešová (Slovakia) Janette Husárová	7–6^{(5)}, 6–3
Loss	10.	24 May 2008	Internationaux de Strasbourg, France	Clay	(Chinese Taipei) Chan Yung-jan	(China) Yan Zi (Ukraine) Tatiana Perebiynis	4–6, 7–6^{(3)}, [6–10]
Win	9.	27 July 2008	Los Angeles Classic, U.S.	Hard	(Chinese Taipei) Chan Yung-jan	(Czech Republic) Eva Hrdinová (Czech Republic) Vladimíra Uhlířová	2–6, 7–5, [10–4]
Win	10.	28 September 2008	Korea Open	Hard	(Chinese Taipei) Hsieh Su-wei	(Russia) Vera Dushevina (Russia) Maria Kirilenko	6–3, 6–0
Win	11.	12 April 2009	Ponte Vedra Beach, U.S.	Clay	(India) Sania Mirza	(Czech Republic) Květa Peschke (United States) Lisa Raymond	6–3, 4–6, [10–7]
Win	12.	9 August 2009	Los Angeles Classic, U.S.	Hard	(China) Yan Zi	(Russia) Maria Kirilenko (Poland) Agnieszka Radwańska	6–0, 4–6, [10–7]
Win	13.	18 October 2009	Osaka Open, Japan	Hard	(United States) Lisa Raymond	(South Africa) Chanelle Scheepers (United States) Abigail Spears	6–2, 6–4
Win	14.	16 January 2010	Hobart International, Australia	Hard	(Czech Republic) Květa Peschke	(Chinese Taipei) Chan Yung-jan (Romania) Monica Niculescu	3–6, 6–3, [10–7]
Loss	11.	11 April 2010	Ponte Vedra Beach, U.S.	Clay	(China) Peng Shuai	(United States) Bethanie Mattek-Sands (China) Yan Zi	6–4, 4–6, [8–10]
Win	15.	9 October 2010	China Open	Hard	(Belarus) Olga Govortsova	(Argentina) Gisela Dulko (Italy) Flavia Pennetta	7–6^{(2)}, 1–6, [10–7]
Win	16.	21 May 2011	Internationaux de Strasbourg, France	Clay	(Uzbekistan) Akgul Amanmuradova	(South Africa) Natalie Grandin (Czech Republic) Vladimíra Uhlířová	6–4, 5–7, [10–2]
Win	17.	27 August 2011	New Haven Open, U.S.	Hard	(Belarus) Olga Govortsova	(Italy) Sara Errani (Italy) Roberta Vinci	7–5, 6–2
Loss	12.	14 January 2012	Hobart International, Australia	Hard	(New Zealand) Marina Erakovic	(Romania) Irina-Camelia Begu (Romania) Monica Niculescu	6–7^{(4)}, 7–6^{(4)}, [5–10]
Win	18.	4 March 2012	Malaysia Open	Hard	(Chinese Taipei) Chang Kai-chen	(Chinese Taipei) Chan Hao-ching (Japan) Rika Fujiwara	7–5, 6–4
Win	19.	5 May 2012	Portugal Open	Clay	(China) Zhang Shuai	(Kazakhstan) Yaroslava Shvedova (Kazakhstan) Galina Voskoboeva	4–6, 6–1, [11–9]
Win	20.	20 September 2014	Guangzhou Open, China	Hard	(China) Liang Chen	(France) Alizé Cornet (Poland) Magda Linette	2–6, 7–6^{(3)}, [10–7]
Win	21.	23 May 2015	Internationaux de Strasbourg, France	Clay	(China) Liang Chen	(Ukraine) Nadiia Kichenok (China) Zheng Saisai	4–6, 6–4, [12–10]
Loss	13.	29 August 2015	Connecticut Open, U.S.	Hard	(China) Liang Chen	(Germany) Julia Görges (Czech Republic) Lucie Hradecká	3–6, 1–6
Win	22.	20 February 2016	Dubai Championships, United Arab Emirates	Hard	(Croatia) Darija Jurak	(France) Caroline Garcia (France) Kristina Mladenovic	6–4, 6–4
Loss	14.	27 August 2016	Connecticut Open, U.S.	Hard	(Ukraine) Kateryna Bondarenko	(India) Sania Mirza (Romania) Monica Niculescu	5–7, 4–6

== WTA Challenger finals ==
=== Doubles: 5 (3 titles, 2 runner-ups) ===
Result	W–L	Date	Tournament	Surface	Partner	Opponents	Score
Win	1-0	Jul 2014	Jiangxi Open, China	Hard	(Japan) Junri Namigata	(Chinese Taipei) Chan Chin-wei (China) Xu Yifan	7–6^{(4)}, 6–3
Win	2-0	Sep 2014	Suzhou Ladies Open, China	Hard	(Chinese Taipei) Chan Chin-wei	(Japan) Misa Eguchi (Japan) Eri Hozumi	6–1, 3–6, [10–7]
Loss	2-1	Nov 2014	Taipei Ladies Open, Taiwan	Carpet (i)	(Chinese Taipei) Chang Kai-chen	(Chinese Taipei) Chan Hao-ching (Chinese Taipei) Chan Yung-jan	4–6, 3–6
Loss	2-2	Nov 2016	Taipei Challenger, Taiwan	Hard (i)	(Chinese Taipei) Chang Kai-chen	(Russia) Natela Dzalamidze (Russia) Veronika Kudermetova	6–4, 3–6, [5–10]
Win	3-2	Jun 2017	Bol Ladies Open, Croatia	Clay	(Czech Republic) Renata Voracova	(North Macedonia) Lina Gjorcheska (Bulgaria) Aleksandrina Naydenova	6–4, 6–2

== ITF Circuit finals ==
$100,000 tournaments
$75,000 tournaments
$50,000 tournaments
$25,000 tournaments
$10,000 tournaments

=== Singles: 15 (10–5) ===
Result	No.	Date	Tournament	Surface	Opponent	Score
Loss	1.	18 March 2001	ITF Kaohsiung, Taiwan	Hard	(Chinese Taipei) Hsieh Su-wei	4–6, 6–3, 3–6
Win	1.	28 October 2001	ITF Manila, Philippines	Hard	(Philippines) Dianne Matias	6–2, 6–1
Win	2.	4 November 2001	ITF Manila, Philippines	Hard	(Thailand) Prariyawan Ratanakrong	6–0, 6–1
Win	3.	28 April 2003	ITF Jakarta, Indonesia	Clay	(Malaysia) Khoo Chin-bee	7–5, 6–4
Win	4.	11 May 2003	ITF Surabaya, Indonesia	Clay	(Indonesia) Liza Andriyani	6–3, 3–6, 6–1
Win	5.	8 June 2003	ITF Seoul, South Korea	Hard	(Uzbekistan) Ivanna Israilova	6–2, 6–2
Win	6.	10 August 2003	ITF Nonthaburi, Thailand	Hard	(Thailand) Suchanun Viratprasert	6–2, 6–1
Win	7.	10 April 2004	ITF New Delhi, India	Hard	(China) Hao Jie	6–3, 6–1
Win	8.	21 June 2004	ITF Incheon, South Korea	Hard	(South Korea) Lee Eun-jeong	6–3, 6–2
Win	9.	28 August 2004	ITF New Delhi, India	Hard	(India) Sania Mirza	7–5, 6–4
Loss	2.	22 May 2005	ITF Changwon, South Korea	Hard	(South Korea) Kim Jin-hee	6–4, 3–6, 4–6
Loss	3.	13 November 2005	ITF Jakarta, Indonesia	Hard	(Indonesia) Wynne Prakusya	4–6, 6–4, 1–6
Loss	4.	23 July 2006	Kurume Cup, Japan	Carpet	(Chinese Taipei) Latisha Chan	7–5, 4–6, 2–6
Win	10.	22 October 2006	ITF Makinohara, Japan	Carpet	(Japan) Erika Takao	6–0, 6–4
Loss	5.	18 March 2001	ITF Sutama, Japan	Hard	(Chinese Taipei) Hsieh Su-wei	4–6, 3–6

=== Doubles: 48 (33–15) ===
Result	No.	Date	Tournament	Surface	Partner	Opponents	Score
Win	1.	28 October 2001	ITF Manila, Philippines	Hard	(Chinese Taipei) Weng Tzu-ting	(Chinese Taipei) Chao Hsiao-han (Malaysia) Khoo Chin-bee	6–4, 6–4
Win	2.	11 November 2001	ITF Manila, Philippines	Hard	(Chinese Taipei) Weng Tzu-ting	(South Korea) Ha Ji-sun (South Korea) Shin Mi-ran	6–0, 6–3
Win	3.	3 February 2002	ITF Wellington, New Zealand	Hard	(Chinese Taipei) Chan Chin-wei	(Australia) Nicole Kriz (Australia) Sarah Stone	4–6, 7–6^{(3)}, 6–2
Loss	1.	26 May 2002	ITF Tianjin, China	Hard (i)	(Chinese Taipei) Chan Chin-wei	(China) Yan Zi (China) Zheng Jie	0–6, 4–6
Loss	2.	28 January 2003	ITF Wellington, New Zealand	Hard	(New Zealand) Ilke Gers	(Australia) Lauren Breadmore (Australia) Kristen van Elden	4–6, 1–6
Loss	3.	3 March 2003	ITF Warrnambool, Australia	Grass	(New Zealand) Ilke Gers	(Australia) Monique Adamczak (Germany) Madita Suer	4–6, 4–6
Win	4.	17 March 2003	ITF Yarrawonga, Australia	Grass	(New Zealand) Ilke Gers	(United Kingdom) Sarah Borwell (Australia) Bree Calderwood	6–1, 7–5
Loss	4.	24 March 2003	ITF Albury, Australia	Grass	(New Zealand) Ilke Gers	(Australia) Nicole Sewell (Netherlands) Andrea van den Hurk	6–2, 1–6, 4–6
Win	5.	4 May 2003	ITF Jakarta, Indonesia	Clay	(Chinese Taipei) Hwang I-hsuan	(Indonesia) Sandy Gumulya (Indonesia) Septi Mende	6–4, 6–3
Win	6.	11 May 2003	ITF Surabaya, Indonesia	Clay	(Malaysia) Khoo Chin-bee	(Indonesia) Liza Andriyani (Indonesia) Wukirasih Sawondari	6–1, 6–0
Loss	5.	15 June 2003	ITF Seoul, South Korea	Hard	(Chinese Taipei) Chan Chin-wei	(South Korea) Choi Jin-young (South Korea) Kim Mi-ok	2–6, 6–4, 5–7
Win	7.	10 August 2003	ITF Nonthaburi, Thailand	Hard	(Chinese Taipei) Chan Chin-wei	(South Korea) Kim Jin-hee (Japan) Ryoko Takemura	6–2, 7–5
Win	8.	17 August 2003	ITF Nakhon Ratchasima, Thailand	Hard	(Chinese Taipei) Chan Chin-wei	(China) Dong Yanhua (China) Zhang Yao	6–4, 6–1
Win	9.	22 November 2003	ITF Tainan, Taiwan	Clay	(Chinese Taipei) Chan Chin-wei	(Japan) Satomi Kinjo (Chinese Taipei) Wang I-ting	6–3, 6–1
Loss	6.	5 April 2004	ITF New Delhi, India	Hard	(Malaysia) Khoo Chin-bee	(China) Yang Shujing (China) Yu Ying	6–7^{(8)}, 1–2 ret.
Loss	7.	2 May 2004	Kangaroo Cup, Japan	Carpet	(Indonesia) Wynne Prakusya	(South Korea) Cho Yoon-jeong (South Korea) Jeon Mi-ra	6–7^{(4)}, 2–6
Win	10.	6 June 2004	ITF Wulanhaote, China	Hard	(Thailand) Napaporn Tongsalee	(China) Du Rui (China) Liu Nannan	3–6, 6–2, 6–3
Win	11.	13 June 2004	ITF Beijing, China	Hard (i)	(Indonesia) Wynne Prakusya	(Latvia) Līga Dekmeijere (Turkey) İpek Şenoğlu	6–3, 6–1
Win	12.	29 August 2004	ITF New Delhi, India	Hard	(Chinese Taipei) Hsieh Su-wei	(Uzbekistan) Akgul Amanmuradova (India) Sania Mirza	7–6^{(8)}, 6–4
Loss	8.	24 October 2004	ITF Haibara, Japan	Carpet	(Chinese Taipei) Hsieh Su-wei	(Chinese Taipei) Chan Chin-wei (Chinese Taipei) Latisha Chan	6–7^{(5)}, 6–4, 6–7^{(3)}
Loss	9.	30 October 2004	ITF Shenzhen, China	Hard	(Chinese Taipei) Hsieh Su-wei	(China) Yan Zi (China) Zheng Jie	3–6, 1–6
Win	13.	27 February 2005	ITF Taipei, Taiwan	Hard	(Chinese Taipei) Hsieh Su-wei	(Japan) Ryōko Fuda (Japan) Seiko Okamoto	6–3, 6–2
Loss	10.	14 May 2005	Fukuoka International, Japan	Carpet	(Chinese Taipei) Latisha Chan	(Japan) Ryōko Fuda (Japan) Seiko Okamoto	2–6, 6–7
Win	14.	22 May 2005	ITF Changwon, South Korea	Hard	(Japan) Seiko Okamoto	(Chinese Taipei) Chan Chin-wei (Chinese Taipei) Hsieh Su-wei	6–2, 7–5
Win	15.	29 May 2005	ITF Shanghai, China	Hard	(Japan) Remi Tezuka	(China) Liu Wanting (China) Sun Shengnan	4–6, 6–4, 6–1
Win	16.	5 June 2005	ITF Nanjing, China	Hard	(China) Xie Yanze	(Argentina) María José Argeri (Brazil) Letícia Sobral	6–3, 6–7^{(5)}, 6–2
Loss	11.	8 November 2005	ITF Jakarta, Indonesia	Hard	(Chinese Taipei) Latisha Chan	(Japan) Ryōko Fuda (Indonesia) Wynne Prakusya	4–6, 4–6
Win	17.	17 February 2006	ITF Sydney, Australia	Hard	(Chinese Taipei) Latisha Chan	(Japan) Ayumi Morita (Japan) Junri Namigata	6–2, 6–1
Win	18.	26 February 2006	ITF Gosford, Australia	Hard	(Chinese Taipei) Latisha Chan	(Australia) Beti Sekulovski (Australia) Cindy Watson	6–2, 6–3
Loss	12.	24 March 2006	ITF Melbourne, Australia	Clay	(Chinese Taipei) Latisha Chan	(Australia) Monique Adamczak (Argentina) Erica Krauth	6–7^{(4)}, 6–1, 1–6
Loss	13.	2 May 2006	Kangaroo Cup, Japan	Carpet	(Chinese Taipei) Latisha Chan	(Chinese Taipei) Chan Chin-wei (Chinese Taipei) Hsieh Su-wei	6–7^{(5)}, 6–3, 5–7
Win	19.	14 May 2006	Fukuoka International, Japan	Grass	(Chinese Taipei) Latisha Chan	(New Zealand) Leanne Baker (Australia) Christina Horiatopoulos	6–1, 6–2
Win	20.	21 May 2006	ITF Ho Chi Minh City, Vietnam	Hard	(Thailand) Napaporn Tongsalee	(Latvia) Līga Dekmeijere (Australia) Trudi Musgrave	4–6, 6–1, 6–0
Win	21.	23 May 2006	ITF Beijing, China	Hard (i)	(Thailand) Tamarine Tanasugarn	(Russia) Nina Bratchikova (Latvia) Līga Dekmeijere	4–6, 6–2, 6–3
Win	22.	18 June 2006	ITF Incheon, South Korea	Hard	(Thailand) Napaporn Tongsalee	(South Korea) Yoo Mi (South Korea) Lee Jin-a	6–2, 6–4
Win	23.	9 July 2006	ITF Nagoya, Japan	Hard	(Japan) Shiho Hisamatsu	(Japan) Ayami Takase (Japan) Seiko Okamoto	6–2, 6–3
Win	24.	23 July 2006	Kurume Cup, Japan	Carpet	(Chinese Taipei) Latisha Chan	(Japan) Ayami Takase (Japan) Seiko Okamoto	w/o
Win	25.	21 August 2006	ITF Nanjing, China	Hard	(China) Xie Yanze	(Indonesia) Ji Chunmei (Indonesia) Sun Shengnan	6–1, 7–6^{(11)}
Win	26.	29 October 2006	ITF Hamanako, Japan	Carpet	(Chinese Taipei) Hsieh Su-wei	(Japan) Maki Arai (Japan) Seiko Okamoto	7–6^{(2)}, 7–5
Win	27.	14 November 2006	ITF Kaohsiung, Taiwan	Hard	(Chinese Taipei) Latisha Chan	(Chinese Taipei) Chan Chin-wei (Chinese Taipei) Hsieh Su-wei	7–6^{(1)}, 6–1
Win	28.	22 April 2007	ITF Dothan, United States	Clay	(Chinese Taipei) Latisha Chan	(Germany) Angelika Bachmann (Germany) Vanessa Henke	6–2, 6–3
Win	29.	26 October 2008	Taipei Open, Taiwan	Carpet (i)	(Chinese Taipei) Hsieh Su-wei	(Chinese Taipei) Hsu Wen-hsin (Chinese Taipei) Hwang I-hsuan	6–3, 6–3
Win	30.	2 November 2009	Taipei Open, Taiwan	Hard (i)	(Chinese Taipei) Latisha Chan	(Indonesia) Yayuk Basuki (United States) Riza Zalameda	6–3, 3–6, [10–7]
Win	31.	7 November 2010	Taipei Open, Taiwan	Carpet (i)	(Chinese Taipei) Chang Kai-chen	(India) Sania Mirza (Chinese Taipei) Hsieh Su-wei	6–4, 6–2
Loss	14.	13 December 2013	ITF Hong Kong	Hard	(Chinese Taipei) Lee Ya-hsuan	(Australia) Ellen Perez (Australia) Abbie Myers	6–4, 3–6, [8–10]
Win	32.	27 April 2014	ITF Seoul, South Korea	Hard	(Chinese Taipei) Chan Chin-wei	(France) Irena Pavlovic (Czech Republic) Kristýna Plíšková	6–4, 6–3
Win	33.	31 May 2014	ITF Changwon, Korea	Hard	(Japan) Junri Namigata	(South Korea) Lee Ye-ra (South Korea) Kim So-jung	7–6^{(5)}, 6–0
Loss	15.	21 May 2017	Empire Slovak Open, Slovakia	Clay	(Czech Republic) Renata Voráčová	(United Kingdom) Naomi Broady (United Kingdom) Heather Watson	3–6, 2–6
