= Kim Sun-yong =

South Korean tennis player (born 1987)

- Country (sports): South Korea
- Born: 26 May 1987 (age 39) Seoul, South Korea
- Plays: Right-handed

Singles
- Career record: 3-1
- Highest ranking: No. 660 (8 May 2006)

Doubles
- Highest ranking: No. 327 (10 July 2006)
Medal record
Asian Games
Bronze medal – third place	2006 Doha	Men's doubles
Universiade
Bronze medal – third place	2007 Bangkok	Men's doubles

Kim Sun-yong Jr. (born 26 May 1987) is a South Korean former professional tennis player.

Kim, who was born in Seoul, won the junior doubles title at the 2005 Australian Open, partnering Taiwan's Yi Chu-huan. He was runner-up in the boys' singles event to Donald Young and was also a singles semi-finalist at the 2005 US Open juniors.

A right-handed player, Kim featured in three Davis Cup ties for South Korea. In 2005 he won both of his singles matches against Pacific Oceania, then played a dead rubber in the Group II final against New Zealand, which he lost to Jose Statham. His only other appearance came in 2007, when he won in the singles against Dmitriy Makeyev of Kazakhstan.

== See also ==
- List of South Korea Davis Cup team representatives
