= Joji Miyao =

Japanese tennis player (born 1981)

- Country (sports): Japan
- Born: 15 June 1981 (age 43)
- Prize money: $22,754

Singles
- Career record: 0–2
- Highest ranking: No. 863 (6 January 2003)

Doubles
- Career record: 0–1
- Highest ranking: No. 503 (6 June 2005)

Joji Miyao (born 15 June 1981) is a Japanese former professional tennis player.

== Biography ==
Miyao competed in the main draw in three editions of the Japan Open, the singles in 2000, doubles in 2001, then singles again in 2002, all as a local wildcard.

He made one ATP Challenger final during his career, the doubles at Kyoto in 2005, which he and Atsuo Ogawa lost in three sets to Czechs Pavel Šnobel and Michal Tabara.

A student at Waseda University, Miyao represented Japan at the 2005 Summer Universiade in Izmir, Turkey and won a bronze medal for the mixed doubles.

In 2008 he was arrested by police in Tokyo for possession of cannabis.
