= Ryōko Fuda =

Japanese tennis player (born 1986)

- Native name: 不田涼子
- Country (sports): Japan
- Residence: Kobe, Hyogo
- Born: 25 October 1986 (age 38) Kobe, Hyogo
- Height: 1.65 m (5 ft 5 in)
- Turned pro: 2003
- Retired: 2012
- Plays: Right-handed (two-handed backhand)
- Prize money: US$ 185,680

Singles
- Career record: 211–149
- Career titles: 0 WTA, 4 ITF
- Highest ranking: No. 143 (30 January 2006)

Grand Slam singles results
- Australian Open: Q3 (2006)
- French Open: Q1 (2010)
- Wimbledon: Q1 (2005)
- US Open: Q3 (2006)

Doubles
- Career record: 86–56
- Career titles: 0 WTA, 7 ITF
- Highest ranking: No. 144 (20 February 2006)

Ryōko Fuda (不田涼子, Fuda Ryōko) (born 25 October 1986) is a retired Japanese tennis player. She turned professional in December 2003.

== Biography ==
Fuda began playing at age five and was introduced to the sport by her father, Koji, a business owner, and mother, Atsuko. She speaks both Japanese and English and her favorite playing surface is hardcourt. She was coached by Masahide Sakamoto. Ryoko plays using her right hand. According to the WTA, she was introduced to tennis by playing on neighborhood courts.

In her career, Fuda won four singles titles and seven doubles titles on tournaments of the ITF Circuit.

== ITF finals ==
Legend
$100,000 tournaments
$75,000 tournaments
$50,000 tournaments
$25,000 tournaments
$10,000 tournaments

=== Singles: 6 (4–2) ===
Result	No.	Date	Tournament	Surface	Opponent	Score
Win	1.	26 October 2003	ITF Tokyo, Japan	Hard	(Japan) Maki Arai	5–7, 6–3, 6–3
Loss	1.	29 March 2005	ITF Poza Rica, Mexico	Hard	(Italy) Mara Santangelo	6–3, 2–6, 0–6
Win	2.	1 May 2005	ITF Hamanako, Japan	Hard	(Australia) Casey Dellacqua	4–1 ret.
Win	3.	23 May 2005	ITF Phuket, Thailand	Hard	(Thailand) Montinee Tangphong	6–1, 6–4
Win	4.	22 November 2005	ITF Mount Gambier, Australia	Hard	(Australia) Anastasia Rodionova	6–2, 6–3
Loss	2.	7 June 2010	ITF El Paso, United States	Hard	(United States) CoCo Vandeweghe	2–6, 1–6

=== Doubles: 15 (7–8) ===
Result	No.	Date	Tournament	Surface	Partner	Opponents	Score
Loss	1.	20 April 2003	ITF Yamaguchi, Japan	Clay	(Japan) Maki Arai	(Japan) Akiko Kinebuchi (Japan) Tomoko Taira	6–3, 6–7^{(7)}, 4–6
Win	1.	26 October 2003	ITF Tokyo, Japan	Hard	(Japan) Maki Arai	(Japan) Shizu Katsumi (South Korea) Kim Hea-mi	6–2, 6–3
Loss	2.	10 May 2004	ITF Karuizawa, Japan	Carpet	(Japan) Seiko Okamoto	(Japan) Rika Fujiwara (South Korea) Jeon Mi-ra	2–6, 6–2, 6–7
Loss	3.	22 November 2004	ITF Mount Gambier, Australia	Hard	(Chinese Taipei) Hsieh Su-wei	(Chinese Taipei) Chan Chin-wei (Chinese Taipei) Chan Yung-jan	3–6, 7–5, 5–7
Loss	4.	14 February 2005	ITF Bromma, Sweden	Hard (i)	(Japan) Rika Fujiwara	(Netherlands) Michelle Gerards (Netherlands) Anousjka van Exel	w/o
Loss	5.	21 February 2005	ITF Taipei, Taiwan	Hard	(Japan) Seiko Okamoto	(Chinese Taipei) Chuang Chia-jung (Chinese Taipei) Hsieh Su-wei	3–6, 2–6
Win	2.	1 May 2005	ITF Hamanako, Japan	Hard	(Japan) Seiko Okamoto	(Japan) Shiho Hisamatsu (Japan) Ayami Takase	7–5, 6–4
Loss	6.	8 May 2005	ITF Gifu, Japan	Carpet	(Japan) Seiko Okamoto	(Japan) Rika Fujiwara (Japan) Saori Obata	1–6, 2–6
Win	3.	14 May 2005	ITF Fukuoka, Japan	Carpet	(Japan) Seiko Okamoto	(Chinese Taipei) Chan Yung-jan (Chinese Taipei) Chuang Chia-jung	6–2, 7–6
Win	4.	8 November 2005	ITF Jakarta, Indonesia	Hard	(Indonesia) Wynne Prakusya	(Chinese Taipei) Chan Yung-jan (Chinese Taipei) Chuang Chia-jung	6–4, 6–4
Win	5.	27 November 2005	ITF Mount Gambier, Australia	Hard	(United States) Sunitha Rao	(Germany) Gréta Arn (Australia) Anastasia Rodionova	6–1, ret.
Loss	7.	23 July 2006	ITF Hammond, United States	Hard	(United States) Sunitha Rao	(United States) Christina Fusano (United States) Raquel Kops-Jones	6–7, 6–4, 1–6
Win	6.	19 February 2007	ITF Clearwater, United States	Hard	(Japan) Seiko Okamoto	(Bosnia and Herzegovina) Mervana Jugić-Salkić (Italy) Antonella Serra Zanetti	5–7, 6–3, 6–4
Loss	8.	4 June 2007	ITF Hilton Head, United States	Hard	(United States) Mami Inoue	(United States) Alexandra Mueller (United States) Stacia Fonseca	3–6, 2–6
Win	7.	17 June 2007	ITF Allentown, United States	Hard	(United States) Sunitha Rao	(United States) Angela Haynes (United States) Lindsay Lee-Waters	6–7^{(3)}, 6–4, 6–1
