= Abdulla Al-Haji =

Qatari tennis player

- Country (sports): Qatar
- Born: December 5, 1990 (age 34)
- Prize money: $35,376

Singles
- Career record: 0–3

Doubles
- Career record: 0–2

Abdulla Al-Haji (born December 5, 1990) is a tennis player from Qatar. He played an Association of Tennis Professionals (ATP) tournament at the 2008 Qatar Open, where he fell to Michael Berrer. He again participated in the 2010 Qatar Open, where he lost to Olivier Rochus.
