= Yu Xinyuan =

Chinese tennis player

Yu Xinyuan 于欣源
- Country (sports): China
- Residence: Beijing, China
- Born: 13 February 1985 (age 41) Beijing, China
- Height: 1.81 m (5 ft 11 in)
- Retired: 2010
- Plays: Left-handed (two-handed backhand)
- Prize money: US$78,457

Singles
- Career record: 6–8
- Career titles: 0; 0 Challenger, 3 Futures
- Highest ranking: No. 389 (10 July 2006)

Other tournaments
- Olympic Games: 1R (2008)

Doubles
- Career record: 10–9
- Career titles: 0; 4 Challenger, 19 Futures
- Highest ranking: No. 136 (3 November 2008)

Other doubles tournaments
- Olympic Games: 1R (2008)
- Last updated on: 29 June 2021.

Yu Xinyuan (Chinese: 于欣源; born February 13, 1985) is a Chinese former tennis player.

He competed for China at the 2008 Summer Olympics in the men's singles and in men's doubles with partner Zeng Shao-Xuan.

== ATP Challenger and ITF Futures finals ==
=== Singles: 4 (3–1) ===
Legend ATP Challenger (0–0) ITF Futures (3–1)	Finals by surface Hard (3–1) Clay (0–0) Grass (0–0) Carpet (0–0)

Result	W–L	Date	Tournament	Tier	Surface	Opponent	Score
Win	1–0	May 2005	China F2, Tianjin	Futures	Hard	(China) Lu Hao	1–6, 6–3, 6–0
Win	2–0	Mar 2006	China F4, Jiangmen	Futures	Hard	(Netherlands) Antal Van Der Duim	6–1, 6–2
Win	3–0	Jul 2006	Japan F8, Tokyo	Futures	Hard	(Japan) Gouichi Motomura	7–5, 6–3
Loss	3–1	Jul 2007	China F5, Shenzhen	Futures	Hard	(United States) Phillip King	4–6, 1–6

=== Doubles: 37 (23–14) ===
Legend ATP Challenger (4–3) ITF Futures (19–11)	Finals by surface Hard (22–11) Clay (1–3) Grass (0–0) Carpet (0–0)

Result	W–L	Date	Tournament	Tier	Surface	Partner	Opponents	Score
Loss	0–1	Apr 2005	Japan F2, Hokuto	Futures	Clay	(China) Lu Hao	(United States) David Martin (New Zealand) Mark Nielsen	4–6, 1–6
Win	1–1	May 2005	China F1, Beijing	Futures	Hard	(China) Ben-Qiang Zhu	(Brazil) Josh Goffi (United States) Philip Stolt	6–4, 7–5
Win	2–1	May 2005	China F2, Tianjin	Futures	Hard	(China) Ben-Qiang Zhu	(Brazil) Josh Goffi (United States) Philip Stolt	6–4, 2–6, 6–4
Win	3–1	Jun 2005	China F3, Wuhan	Futures	Hard	(China) Lu Hao	(Chinese Taipei) Lee Hsin-Han (Chinese Taipei) Liu Tai-Wei	7–6^{(7–4)}, 6–3
Win	4–1	Jul 2005	China F5, Beijing	Futures	Hard	(China) Yu Zhang	(Chinese Taipei) Chang Kai-Lung (Chinese Taipei) Hsieh Wang-Cheng	4–6, 7–5, 6–1
Loss	4–2	Nov 2005	China F7, Jiangmen	Futures	Hard	(China) Yu Wang	(Austria) Alexander Peya (Germany) Lars Uebel	6–7^{(7–9)}, 4–6
Win	5–2	Mar 2006	China F4, Jiangmen	Futures	Hard	(China) Ben-Qiang Zhu	(United Kingdom) Chris Eaton (United Kingdom) Andrew Kennaugh	6–4, 7–5
Loss	5–3	Jun 2006	Spain F17, Maspalomas	Futures	Clay	(Spain) J Ramos-Martinez	(Spain) Mariano Albert-Ferrando (Spain) A Baldellou-Esteva	6–4, 2–6, 4–6
Win	6–3	Jun 2006	Thailand F2, Bangkok	Futures	Hard	(China) Ben-Qiang Zhu	(South Africa) Stephen Mitchell (South Africa) Izak Van Der Merwe	1–6, 6–2, 6–4
Win	7–3	Jul 2006	Japan F8, Tokyo	Futures	Hard	(China) Ben-Qiang Zhu	(Japan) Yaoki Ishii (Japan) Joji Miyao	6–0, 6–3
Win	8–3	Aug 2006	Thailand F4, Bangkok	Futures	Hard	(China) Ben-Qiang Zhu	(South Korea) An Jae-Sung (South Korea) Chung Hee-seok	6–2, 5–7, 6–4
Win	9–3	Aug 2006	Thailand F5, Nonthaburi	Futures	Hard	(China) Ben-Qiang Zhu	(South Korea) An Jae-Sung (South Korea) Chung Hee-seok	6–2, 4–6, 6–2
Loss	9–4	Oct 2006	Japan F11, Kashiwa	Futures	Hard	(China) Gong Maoxin	(United States) Minh Le (Japan) Hiroyasu Sato	6–7^{(1–7)}, 3–6
Win	10–4	Mar 2007	Ho Chi Minh City, Vietnam	Challenger	Hard	(China) Zeng Shaoxuan	(Germany) Sebastian Rieschick (Chinese Taipei) Jimmy Wang	7–6^{(7–2)}, 6–3
Win	11–4	Mar 2007	Japan F1, Tokyo	Futures	Hard	(China) Zeng Shaoxuan	(United States) Minh Le (Japan) Hiroyasu Sato	6–2, 7–6^{(7–3)}
Win	12–4	Apr 2007	Japan F2, Tokyo	Futures	Hard	(China) Zeng Shaoxuan	(China) Yu Wang (Japan) Hiroyasu Sato	6–3, 7–5
Win	13–4	May 2007	Korea F2, Daegu	Futures	Hard	(China) Zeng Shaoxuan	(Japan) Satoshi Iwabuchi (Japan) Toshihide Matsui	6–3, 5–7, 6–3
Loss	13–5	Jun 2007	China F4, Guangzhou	Futures	Hard	(China) Zeng Shaoxuan	(Chinese Taipei) Yang Tsung-Hua (Chinese Taipei) Lee Hsin-Han	4–6, 6–2, 6–7^{(5–7)}
Win	14–5	Jul 2007	China F5, Shenzhen	Futures	Hard	(China) Zeng Shaoxuan	(Austria) Martin Slanar (United States) Shane La Porte	3–6, 6–3, 6–3
Loss	14–6	Jul 2007	Recanati, Italy	Challenger	Hard	(China) Zeng Shaoxuan	(Italy) Fabio Colangelo (Ukraine) Sergiy Stakhovsky	6–1, 6–7^{(3–7)}, [7–10]
Loss	14–7	Oct 2007	China F6, Beijing	Futures	Hard	(China) Zeng Shaoxuan	(Chinese Taipei) Ti Chen (United States) Phillip King	5–7, 6–3, [7–10]
Win	15–7	Oct 2007	China F7, Beijing	Futures	Hard	(China) Zeng Shaoxuan	(Chinese Taipei) Lin Tzu-Yang (Chinese Taipei) Yi Chu-Huan	7–6^{(7–4)}, 6–3
Win	16–7	Dec 2007	New Delhi, India	Challenger	Hard	(China) Zeng Shaoxuan	(Russia) Pavel Chekhov (Russia) Mikhail Elgin	6–3, 6–3
Win	17–7	Jan 2008	China F1, Shenzhen	Futures	Hard	(China) Zeng Shaoxuan	(Italy) Giancarlo Petrazzuolo (Italy) Paolo Lorenzi	7–6^{(7–1)}, 7–6^{(7–3)}
Win	18–7	Feb 2008	Guangzhou, China	Challenger	Hard	(China) Zeng Shaoxuan	(United States) Phillip King (Thailand) Danai Udomchoke	1–6, 6–3, [10–5]
Loss	18–8	Apr 2008	Saint Brieuc, France	Challenger	Clay	(China) Zeng Shaoxuan	(Romania) Adrian Cruciat (Spain) Daniel Muñoz de la Nava	6–4, 4–6, [4–10]
Loss	18–9	Apr 2008	China F4, Taizhou	Futures	Hard	(China) Zeng Shaoxuan	(Chinese Taipei) Lin Tzu-Yang (Chinese Taipei) Yi Chu-Huan	1–6, 1–6
Loss	18–10	Jun 2008	Recanati, Italy	Challenger	Hard	(China) Zeng Shaoxuan	(Germany) Benedikt Dorsch (Germany) Björn Phau	3–6, 5–7
Win	19–10	Jun 2008	Reggio Emilia, Italy	Challenger	Clay	(China) Zeng Shaoxuan	(Argentina) Mariano Hood (Argentina) Leonardo Mayer	6–3, 6–4
Win	20–10	Sep 2008	Thailand F4, Khon Kaen	Futures	Hard	(China) Gao Wan	(Chinese Taipei) Ti Chen (New Zealand) Mikal Statham	7–5, 6–7^{(8–10)}, [10–7]
Win	21–10	Nov 2008	Malaysia F2, Petaling Jaya	Futures	Hard	(New Zealand) Mikal Statham	(Australia) Steven Goh (Australia) Joel Lindner	6–1, 6–7^{(5–7)}, [10–4]
Loss	21–11	Mar 2009	New Zealand F1, Auckland	Futures	Hard	(China) Gong Maoxin	(New Zealand) G.D. Jones (New Zealand) Daniel King-Turner	3–6, 4–6
Loss	21–12	Mar 2009	New Zealand F2, Hamilton	Futures	Hard	(China) Gong Maoxin	(Australia) Miles Armstrong (Australia) Adam Feeney	2–6, 6–7^{(4–7)}
Win	22–12	Jul 2009	Malaysia F3, Kuala Lumpur	Futures	Hard	(Chinese Taipei) Yang Tsung-Hua	(Malaysia) Yew-Ming Si (Pakistan) Aqeel Khan	7–6^{(7–4)}, 6–3
Win	23–12	May 2010	India F5, New Delhi	Futures	Hard	(India) Ranjeet Virali-Murugesan	(Thailand) Weerapat Doakmaiklee (Thailand) Kittiphong Wachiramanowong	3–6, 6–1, [11–9]
Loss	23–13	Jun 2010	China F5, Wuhan	Futures	Hard	(China) Ma Ya-Nan	(China) Gong Maoxin (China) Zhe Li	5–7, 3–6
Loss	23–14	Sep 2010	China F7, Hangzhou	Futures	Hard	(China) Feng Xue	(China) Peng Gao (China) Wan Gao	3–6, 7–6^{(7–3)}, [6–10]

== See also ==
- Tennis in China
