= Wayne Wong (tennis) =

Hong Kong tennis player

- Full name: "Wayne" Wong Wing-Luen
- Country (sports): Hong Kong
- Born: March 21, 1981 (age 44)
- Plays: Right-handed

Singles
- Career record: 14–11 (ATP Tour & Davis Cup)
- Highest ranking: No. 1158 (February 14, 2005)

Doubles
- Career record: 4–4 (ATP Tour & Davis Cup)
- Highest ranking: No. 1153 (April 14, 1997)

Wong Wing-Luen, Wayne (Chinese: 汪穎麟; Jyutping: wong^{1} wing^{6} leon^{4}, born March 21, 1981, in Hong Kong) is a former tennis player from Hong Kong. He also goes by the nickname "Wayne". As of February 14, 2005, Wong was #1158 in world in the ATP rankings, which is the highest in his career. The right-hander stands 5 feet 7 inches and weighs 140 pounds.

Wong quickly emerged as one of Hong Kong's most highly touted junior players. Between 1995 and 1999, Wong was ranked No. 1 in the Hong Kong Boys' 18U age group each year since the age of 14. Highlights of his junior career include ascending to a number 137 junior world ranking.

Wong is a member of the Hong Kong, China Davis Cup team, he debuted for Hong Kong at age 15 years 332 days in a reverse singles dead rubber against Thailand in an Asia/Oceania Zone Group II First Round tie at Victoria Park in February 1997. He has compiled an 18–12 record in Davis Cup action since 1997.

At the 2006 Asian Games, Wayne won the first round singles match against Mongolia's Badrakh Munkhbaatar, also, he won the second round match against Pakistan's Aqeel Khan. He lost in the third round to eventual gold medalist Danai Udomchoke. In doubles, he and Yu Hiu Tung lost to former World No. 1s and eventual gold medalists Mahesh Bhupathi and Leander Paes. But his run into the men's singles third round is the best result of the Hong Kong tennis team in this event.
