= Lam Po Kuen =

Hong Kong tennis player

- Full name: Polly Lam Po Kuen
- Country (sports): Hong Kong
- Born: 20 April 1982 (age 43)
- Plays: Right-handed
- Prize money: $11,799

Singles
- Career record: 5–10 (Fed Cup)
- Highest ranking: No. 655 (10 Nov 2003)

Doubles
- Career record: 7–10 (Fed Cup)
- Highest ranking: No. 666 (7 Mar 2005)

Polly Lam Po Kuen (born 20 April 1982) is a Hong Kong former professional tennis player.

Lam competed for the Hong Kong Fed Cup team between 1999 and 2010, appearing in a total of 32 rubbers across 24 ties, for five singles and seven doubles wins. She was also a Hong Kong representative at the All-China Games, East Asian Games, 2005 Summer Universiade and 2006 Asian Games.

On the professional tour, Lam featured at ITF circuit level and reached a best singles ranking of 655 in the world.
