= Jun Woong-sun =

South Korean tennis player

- Country (sports): South Korea
- Residence: Seoul, South Korea
- Born: 14 June 1986 (age 40) Seoul, South Korea
- Height: 1.90 m (6 ft 3 in)
- Turned pro: 2005
- Plays: Right-handed
- Prize money: US$172,182

Singles
- Career record: 10–12
- Career titles: 0
- Highest ranking: No. 230 (26 May 2008)

Grand Slam singles results
- Australian Open: Q1 (2009)
- French Open: DNP
- Wimbledon: Q1 (2008)
- US Open: Q2 (2008)

Doubles
- Career record: 3–3
- Career titles: 0
- Highest ranking: No. 253 (19 March 2007)
Medal record
Asian Games
Gold medal – first place	2006 Doha	Team Event
Bronze medal – third place	2006 Doha	Men's Doubles

- Jun Woong-sun
- Hangul: 전웅선
- Hanja: 田雄善
- RR: Jeon Ungseon
- MR: Chŏn Ungsŏn

Jun Woong-sun (born 14 June 1986) is a professional South Korean tennis player.

Jun reached his highest individual ranking on the ATP Tour on May 26, 2008, when he became World number 230. He plays primarily on the Futures circuit and the Challenger circuit.

Jun has been a member of the South Korean Davis Cup team, posting a 9–5 record in singles and a 3–3 record in doubles in twelve ties played.

== Performance timeline ==
Key
W	F	SF	QF	#R	RR	Q#	DNQ	A	NH

(W) winner; (F) finalist; (SF) semifinalist; (QF) quarterfinalist; (#R) rounds 4, 3, 2, 1; (RR) round-robin stage; (Q#) qualification round; (DNQ) did not qualify; (A) absent; (NH) not held; (SR) strike rate (events won / competed); (W–L) win–loss record.

=== Singles ===
Tournament	2008	2009	SR	W–L	Win%
Grand Slam tournaments
Australian Open		Q1	0 / 0	0–0	–
French Open			0 / 0	0–0	–
Wimbledon	Q1		0 / 0	0–0	–
US Open	Q2		0 / 0	0–0	–
Win–loss	0–0	0–0	0 / 0	0–0	–
ATP World Tour Masters 1000
Shanghai Masters	NH		/		–
Win–loss	0–0	0–0	0 / 0	0–0	

== Tour singles titles – all levels (2–2) ==
Legend (singles)
Grand Slam (0–0)
Tennis Masters Cup (0–0)
ATP Masters Series (0–0)
ATP Tour (0–0)
Challengers (0–2)
Futures (2–0)

Outcome	No.	Date	Tournament	Surface	Opponent in the final	Score
Winner	1.	17 April 2006	Kofu, Japan	Carpet	(Japan) Tetsuya Chaen	7–6, 7–5
Winner	2.	24 April 2006	Shizuoka, Japan	Carpet	(South Korea) Kim Son-yong	2–6, 6–3, 6–3
Runner-up	1.	25 June 2007	Almaty, Kazakhstan	Clay	(Germany) Simon Greul	3–6, 2–6
Runner-up	2.	5 May 2008	Dresden, Germany	Clay	(Germany) Andreas Beck	6–2, 3–6, 5–7
