= Zeng Shaoxuan =

Chinese tennis player

Zeng Shaoxuan 曾少眩
- Country (sports): China
- Residence: Jiangsu, China
- Born: 29 August 1981 (age 45) Nanjing, Jiangsu, China
- Height: 1.85 m (6 ft 1 in)
- Turned pro: 2002
- Plays: Right-handed (two-handed backhand)
- Prize money: US$118,412

Singles
- Career record: 5-10
- Highest ranking: No. 299 (4 January 2010)

Other tournaments
- Olympic Games: 1R (2008)

Doubles
- Career record: 18-15
- Highest ranking: No. 129 (9 August 2004)
- Last updated on: 4 February 2012.

Zeng Shaoxuan (also spelled as Zeng Shao-Xuan, Chinese: 曾少眩; pinyin: Zēng Shàoxuàn; Mandarin pronunciation: [tsə́ŋ ʂâʊ ɕɥɛ̂n]; born August 29, 1981) is a Chinese former tennis player. He competed for China at the 2008 Summer Olympics in the men's singles and men's doubles with partner Yu Xinyuan.

In the 2009, ATP Shanghai Masters 1000 (as a wildcard entrant), he made the second round. He defeated Israeli Dudi Sela 2–6, 6–1, 6–4 before losing to Jo-Wilfried Tsonga 3–6, 3–6.

== Performance timeline ==
Key
W	F	SF	QF	#R	RR	Q#	DNQ	A	NH

(W) winner; (F) finalist; (SF) semifinalist; (QF) quarterfinalist; (#R) rounds 4, 3, 2, 1; (RR) round-robin stage; (Q#) qualification round; (DNQ) did not qualify; (A) absent; (NH) not held; (SR) strike rate (events won / competed); (W–L) win–loss record.
To avoid confusion and double counting, these charts are updated at the conclusion of a tournament or when the player's participation has ended.

=== Singles ===
Tournament	2009	SR	W–L	Win %
Shanghai	2R	0 / 1	1–1	50%
Win–loss	1–1	0 / 1	1–1	50%

== See also ==
- Tennis in China
