= Uzbekistan at the 2006 Asian Games =

- IOC code: UZB
- NOC: National Olympic Committee of the Republic of Uzbekistan

in Doha
- Medals Ranked 7th: Gold 11 Silver 14 Bronze 15 Total 40

Asian Games appearances (overview)
- 1994; 1998; 2002; 2006; 2010; 2014; 2018; 2022; 2026

Uzbekistan competed in the 15th Asian Games, officially known as the XV Asiad held in Doha, Qatar from December 1 to December 15, 2006. Uzbekistan ranked 7th with 11 gold medals in this edition of the Asiad.

== Medal table ==
Sport	Gold	Silver	Bronze	Total
Boxing	3	1	2	6
Canoe/Kayak Sprint	2	4	2	8
Wrestling	2	3	3	8
Rowing	2	0	0	2
Athletics	1	4	1	6
Karate	1	0	0	1
Cycling	0	1	0	1
Taekwondo	0	1	0	1
Judo	0	0	4	4
Gymnastics	0	0	1	1
Tennis	0	0	1	1
Weightlifting	0	0	1	1
Total	11	14	15	40
