= Bowling at the 2014 Asian Games – Men's all-events =

Men's all-events at the 2014 Asian Games
- Venue: Anyang Hogye Gymnasium
- Date: 23–30 September 2014
- Competitors: 103 from 18 nations

Medalists
gold medal	Park Jong-woo	South Korea
silver medal	Yannaphon Larpapharat	Thailand
bronze medal	Kang Hee-won	South Korea

The men's all-events competition at the 2014 Asian Games in Incheon was held from 23 to 30 September 2014 at Anyang Hogye Gymnasium.

All-events scores are compiled by totaling series scores from the singles, doubles, trios and team competitions.

== Schedule ==
All times are Korea Standard Time (UTC+09:00)

Date	Time	Event
Tuesday, 23 September 2014	09:00	Singles
Thursday, 25 September 2014	09:00	Doubles
Saturday, 27 September 2014	09:00	Trios – 1st block
Sunday, 28 September 2014	13:30	Trios – 2nd block
Monday, 29 September 2014	09:00	Team – 1st block
Tuesday, 30 September 2014	14:30	Team – 2nd block

== Results ==
Rank	Athlete	Singles	Doubles	Trios	Team	Total
1st place, gold medalist(s)	Park Jong-woo (KOR)	1269	1213	1258	1307	5047
2nd place, silver medalist(s)	Yannaphon Larpapharat (THA)	1319	1135	1309	1252	5015
3rd place, bronze medalist(s)	Kang Hee-won (KOR)	1207	1187	1286	1319	4999
4	Ryan Leonard Lalisang (INA)	1253	1244	1281	1208	4986
5	Zulmazran Zulkifli (MAS)	1298	1163	1234	1285	4980
6	Toshihiko Takahashi (JPN)	1181	1265	1322	1211	4979
7	Kim Kyung-min (KOR)	1260	1256	1224	1227	4967
8	Justin Lim (SIN)	1183	1263	1253	1266	4965
9	Shaker Ali Al-Hassan (UAE)	1230	1281	1186	1237	4934
10	Billy Muhammad Islam (INA)	1218	1275	1157	1264	4914
11	Wu Siu Hong (HKG)	1266	1248	1267	1117	4898
12	Choi Bok-eum (KOR)	1231	1214	1233	1191	4869
13	Hussain Nasir Al-Suwaidi (UAE)	1234	1270	1125	1230	4859
14	Adrian Ang (MAS)	1208	1138	1245	1267	4858
15	Yoshinao Masatoki (JPN)	1201	1268	1206	1179	4854
16	Du Jianchao (CHN)	1300	1138	1129	1285	4852
17	Sithiphol Kunaksorn (THA)	1299	1132	1172	1238	4841
18	Shin Seung-hyeon (KOR)	1263	1140	1153	1273	4829
19	Muhammad Rafiq Ismail (MAS)	1212	1222	1184	1209	4827
20	Nayef Eqab (UAE)	1239	1191	1160	1236	4826
20	Michael Mak (HKG)	1195	1138	1212	1281	4826
22	Timmy Tan (MAS)	1180	1177	1300	1155	4812
23	Tomoyuki Sasaki (JPN)	1174	1219	1230	1180	4803
24	Diwan Rezaldy (INA)	1147	1322	1250	1083	4802
25	Shusaku Asato (JPN)	1060	1258	1309	1167	4794
26	Syafiq Ridhwan (MAS)	1195	1161	1267	1170	4793
27	Wang Zhiyong (CHN)	1257	1180	1191	1159	4787
28	Alex Liew (MAS)	1170	1192	1211	1201	4774
29	Kenneth Chua (PHI)	1171	1136	1238	1223	4768
29	Yeri Ramadona (INA)	1216	1181	1211	1160	4768
31	Hong Hae-sol (KOR)	1229	1136	1147	1241	4753
32	Shogo Wada (JPN)	1221	1115	1342	1072	4750
33	Wang Shizhen (CHN)	1111	1230	1186	1219	4746
34	Mubarak Al-Merikhi (QAT)	1153	1180	1195	1200	4728
35	Biboy Rivera (PHI)	1158	1189	1229	1148	4724
36	Keith Saw (SIN)	1176	1130	1252	1162	4720
37	Mi Zhongli (CHN)	1168	1233	1121	1185	4707
38	Enrico Hernandez (PHI)	1215	1131	1179	1179	4704
38	Frederick Ong (PHI)	1228	1218	1191	1067	4704
40	Hardy Rachmadian (INA)	1171	1214	1194	1122	4701
41	Atittarat Cheng (THA)	1184	1183	1145	1182	4694
42	Ng Chiew Pang (SIN)	1183	1159	1196	1117	4655
43	Kam Siu Lun (HKG)	1133	1200	1141	1179	4653
44	Jassim Al-Merikhi (QAT)	1199	1162	1148	1141	4650
45	Yousef Al-Jaber (QAT)	1183	1168	1197	1098	4646
46	Wicky Yeung (HKG)	1126	1169	1161	1174	4630
47	Daisuke Yoshida (JPN)	1090	1283	1158	1097	4628
48	Lee Tak Man (MAC)	1112	1187	1199	1121	4619
49	Jomar Jumapao (PHI)	1098	1101	1208	1210	4617
50	Annop Arromsaranon (THA)	1273	1056	1215	1069	4613
51	Eric Tseng (HKG)	1134	1116	1211	1149	4610
52	Jasem Al-Saqer (KUW)	1225	1110	1156	1112	4603
53	Joel Tan (SIN)	1115	1159	1076	1204	4554
54	Benshir Layoso (PHI)	1160	1068	1132	1186	4546
55	Yaqoub Al-Shatti (KUW)	1186	1131	1191	1029	4537
56	Abdullah Ahmad (KUW)	1111	1189	1194	1042	4536
57	Yang Wei (CHN)	1206	1075	1072	1155	4508
58	Khalid Al-Dosari (QAT)	1175	1133	1140	1056	4504
58	Hareb Al-Mansoori (UAE)	1131	1149	1128	1096	4504
60	Mostafa Al-Mousawi (KUW)	1172	1104	1090	1131	4497
61	Talal Al-Towireb (KSA)	1089	1151	1146	1099	4485
62	Rakan Al-Ameeri (KUW)	1145	1038	1167	1134	4484
63	Jaris Goh (SIN)	1180	1138	1125	1034	4477
64	Choi Io Fai (MAC)	1048	1167	1143	1115	4473
65	Jassem Al-Deyab (QAT)	1188	1217	1085	975	4465
66	Tam Tsz Sun (MAC)	1007	1210	1054	1187	4458
67	Mahmood Al-Attar (UAE)	1111	1044	1201	1097	4453
68	Bakhtiyor Dalabaev (UZB)	1230	1086	1010	1123	4449
69	Abdullah Al-Dolijan (KSA)	1169	1089	1091	1092	4441
70	Ahmed Al-Deyab (QAT)	1188	1204	1030	1018	4440
71	Javier Tan (SIN)	1091	1162	1081	1099	4433
72	Nguyễn Thành Phố (VIE)	1101	998	1136	1192	4427
73	Panuruj Vilailak (THA)	1136	1034	1157	1089	4416
74	Adel Al-Bariqi (KSA)	1051	1068	1120	1142	4381
75	Qi Wankang (CHN)	1051	1176	1102	1048	4377
76	Zoe Dias Ma (MAC)	1145	1091	1127	989	4352
77	Yasser Abulreesh (KSA)	1200	1010	1042	1087	4339
78	Basel Al-Anzi (KUW)	1050	1069	1138	1072	4329
79	Phạm Quốc Bảo Kỳ (VIE)	1067	1101	1041	1116	4325
80	Sergey Sapov (UZB)	1094	1166	922	1124	4306
81	Adhiguna Widiantoro (INA)	1161	997	1049	1094	4301
82	Mohammed Al-Saud (KSA)	1141	1082	1051	1022	4296
83	Bakhodir Arifov (UZB)	1142	1100	947	1095	4284
84	Chan Yat Long (HKG)	1102	1144	965	1063	4274
85	Đào Xuân Phúc (VIE)	1035	941	1198	1087	4261
86	Mohamed Al-Marzooqi (UAE)	1007	1024	1105	1101	4237
87	Chan Kam Seng (MAC)	1041	1079	1059	1032	4211
88	Ihab Al-Hashimi (YEM)	1120	1140	939	992	4191
89	Fayzulla Nasirov (UZB)	1012	1035	972	1129	4148
90	Dondovyn Zorigt (MGL)	975	1027	1029	1086	4117
91	Bader Al-Shaikh (KSA)	1205	1177	1214	520	4116
92	Jamtsyn Sodnomdorj (MGL)	1084	1003	1044	972	4103
93	Lê Anh Tuấn (VIE)	972	1068	1028	1003	4071
94	Man Si Kei (MAC)	1050	963	1054	1000	4067
95	Viktor Smirnov (UZB)	1032	997	981	1043	4053
96	Bayaraagiin Batmönkh (MGL)	1127	984	986	862	3959
97	Kudrat Khilyamov (UZB)	938	986	933	964	3821
98	Lê Hồng Minh (VIE)	936	906	906	967	3715
99	Ganboldyn Altangerel (MGL)	947	842	947	841	3577
100	Tseveen-Ochiryn Batjargal (MGL)	1039	0	1051	977	3067
101	Miyesengyn Tüvshinsanaa (MGL)	1074	0	1040	944	3058
102	Saeed Al-Hushail (YEM)	978	1044	0	0	2022
103	Phạm Gia Phú (VIE)	0	0	0	0	0
