= Bowling at the 2006 Asian Games – Men's all-events =

Men's all-events at the 2006 Asian Games
- Venue: Qatar Bowling Center
- Date: 3–8 December 2006
- Competitors: 114 from 20 nations

Medalists
gold medal	Bader Al-Shaikh	Saudi Arabia
silver medal	Nayef Eqab	United Arab Emirates
bronze medal	Yannaphon Larpapharat	Thailand

The men's all-events competition at the 2006 Asian Games in Doha was held from 3 December to 8 December 2006 at Qatar Bowling Centre.

All-events scores are compiled by totalling series scores from the singles, doubles, trios and team events.

== Schedule ==
All times are Arabia Standard Time (UTC+03:00)

Date	Time	Event
Sunday, 3 December 2006	17:00	Singles
Monday, 4 December 2006	09:00	Doubles
Tuesday, 5 December 2006	09:00	Trios – First block
Wednesday, 6 December 2006	13:00	Trios – Second block
Thursday, 7 December 2006	09:00	Team – First block
Friday, 8 December 2006	13:30	Team – Second block

== Results ==
Rank	Athlete	Singles	Doubles	Trios	Team	Total
1st place, gold medalist(s)	Bader Al-Shaikh (KSA)	1294	1392	1382	1414	5482
2nd place, silver medalist(s)	Nayef Eqab (UAE)	1245	1446	1362	1354	5407
3rd place, bronze medalist(s)	Yannaphon Larpapharat (THA)	1358	1275	1334	1365	5332
4	Hassan Al-Shaikh (KSA)	1303	1429	1309	1279	5320
5	Ryan Leonard Lalisang (INA)	1442	1328	1203	1316	5289
6	Somjed Kusonphithak (THA)	1253	1493	1299	1236	5281
7	Toshihiko Takahashi (JPN)	1283	1368	1280	1342	5273
8	Aaron Kong (MAS)	1221	1307	1392	1348	5268
9	Jo Nam-yi (KOR)	1264	1243	1406	1347	5260
10	Remy Ong (SIN)	1249	1316	1353	1329	5247
11	Markwin Tee (PHI)	1210	1468	1314	1244	5236
12	Alex Liew (MAS)	1270	1392	1315	1252	5229
13	Lee Yu Wen (SIN)	1261	1418	1309	1232	5220
14	Daniel Lim (MAS)	1241	1355	1323	1293	5212
14	Ben Heng (MAS)	1265	1286	1374	1287	5212
16	Choi Bok-eum (KOR)	1419	1172	1279	1327	5197
17	Saeed Al-Hajri (QAT)	1300	1372	1223	1301	5196
18	Wu Siu Hong (HKG)	1257	1361	1302	1275	5195
19	Tomokatsu Yamashita (JPN)	1258	1277	1336	1323	5194
20	Shaun Ng (SIN)	1197	1361	1223	1411	5192
21	Bandar Al-Shafi (QAT)	1239	1386	1265	1297	5187
22	Abdulla Al-Qattan (QAT)	1257	1410	1260	1241	5168
23	Jason Yeong-Nathan (SIN)	1258	1356	1323	1224	5161
24	Yoshinao Masatoki (JPN)	1365	1231	1273	1283	5152
25	Biboy Rivera (PHI)	1345	1256	1294	1250	5145
26	Azidi Ameran (MAS)	1260	1371	1266	1239	5136
27	Chinnapong Chansuk (THA)	1235	1257	1346	1284	5122
28	Joung Seoung-joo (KOR)	1237	1347	1246	1281	5111
29	Mahmood Al-Attar (UAE)	1401	1195	1176	1334	5106
30	Mohammed Al-Qubaisi (UAE)	1349	1399	1143	1214	5105
31	Masaaki Takemoto (JPN)	1287	1307	1239	1267	5100
32	Kang Hee-won (KOR)	1359	1358	1188	1179	5084
33	Khaled Al-Debayyan (KUW)	1319	1338	1220	1190	5067
34	Khalifa Al-Kubaisi (QAT)	1253	1361	1192	1252	5058
35	Carl de Vries (SIN)	1162	1378	1344	1168	5052
36	Byun Ho-jin (KOR)	1302	1343	1206	1193	5044
37	Osama Khalfan (BRN)	1157	1261	1372	1251	5041
38	Zulmazran Zulkifli (MAS)	1297	1264	1271	1205	5037
39	Jamal Ali Mohammed (UAE)	1196	1336	1257	1247	5036
39	Ahmed Shahin Al-Merikhi (QAT)	1148	1333	1320	1235	5036
41	Paeng Nepomuceno (PHI)	1244	1223	1336	1230	5033
42	Hsieh Yu-ping (TPE)	1181	1241	1283	1322	5027
43	Wang Shizhen (CHN)	1210	1265	1284	1261	5020
44	Hussain Nasir Al-Suwaidi (UAE)	1247	1378	1233	1160	5018
44	Tomoyuki Sasaki (JPN)	1199	1285	1200	1334	5018
46	Wang Tien-fu (TPE)	1290	1257	1274	1189	5010
47	Mohamed Al-Shawoosh (BRN)	1301	1229	1283	1189	5002
48	Christian Jan Suarez (PHI)	1221	1295	1211	1270	4997
48	Yusuf Mohamed Falah (BRN)	1249	1266	1236	1246	4997
50	Fadhel Al-Mousawi (KUW)	1308	1229	1182	1274	4993
51	Faisal Al-Juraifani (KSA)	1233	1357	1180	1213	4983
51	Cheng Fang-yu (TPE)	1169	1301	1314	1199	4983
53	Mubarak Al-Merikhi (QAT)	1202	1262	1298	1200	4962
54	Cheng Chao-sheng (TPE)	1349	1240	1230	1125	4944
55	Daniel Yiu (HKG)	1234	1407	1172	1129	4942
56	Masaru Ito (JPN)	1181	1151	1314	1293	4939
57	Sithiphol Kunaksorn (THA)	1300	1182	1161	1293	4936
58	Ahmed Al-Hdyan (KSA)	1173	1205	1321	1231	4930
59	Zhang Ye (CHN)	1219	1281	1222	1200	4922
60	Park Sang-pil (KOR)	1205	1329	1144	1234	4912
61	Sayed Ibrahim Al-Hashemi (UAE)	1195	1280	1211	1225	4911
62	Daniel Lim (SIN)	1208	1315	1235	1148	4906
63	Cyrus Cheung (HKG)	1237	1292	1208	1161	4898
64	Sou Wai Chon (MAC)	1236	1231	1158	1254	4879
65	Chester King (PHI)	1178	1275	1229	1196	4878
66	Yousif Akbar (KSA)	1158	1292	1214	1212	4876
67	Mohamed Ahmed Mustafa (BRN)	1240	1265	1175	1193	4873
68	Dennis Ranova Pulunggono (INA)	1273	1118	1220	1254	4865
69	Hameed Taqi (BRN)	1172	1182	1259	1247	4860
70	Wicky Yeung (HKG)	1193	1185	1227	1249	4854
71	Haqi Rumandung (INA)	1218	1100	1249	1285	4852
72	Kao Hai-yuan (TPE)	1217	1179	1226	1219	4841
73	Choi Io Fai (MAC)	1227	1194	1218	1164	4803
74	Basel Al-Anzi (KUW)	1238	1316	1163	1076	4793
75	Kairat Baibolatov (KAZ)	1309	1184	1107	1172	4772
76	Jasem Al-Saqer (KUW)	1274	1195	1139	1160	4768
77	Tyrone Ongpauco (PHI)	1125	1274	1169	1191	4759
78	Kot Ka Kit (MAC)	1189	1153	1181	1192	4715
79	Rudy Goenawan (INA)	1100	1157	1274	1178	4709
80	Wang Bin (CHN)	1098	1176	1137	1292	4703
81	Van Ka Kei (MAC)	1142	1160	1229	1165	4696
82	Hengki Susanto (INA)	1138	1186	1224	1147	4695
83	Chen Yung-chuan (TPE)	1278	1135	1169	1112	4694
84	Jia Ling (CHN)	1167	1256	1169	1076	4668
85	Mohammad Al-Regeebah (KUW)	1076	1251	1222	1077	4626
86	Rakan Al-Ameeri (KUW)	1122	1126	1153	1224	4625
87	Wang Yingjun (CHN)	1165	1188	1120	1132	4605
88	Ng Cheng Chok (MAC)	1103	1147	1092	1247	4589
89	Michael Tsang (HKG)	1094	1179	1142	1159	4574
90	Edwin Lioe (INA)	1113	1178	1153	1128	4572
91	Eric Tseng (HKG)	1149	1170	1175	1052	4546
92	Girish Ashok Gaba (IND)	1154	1104	1120	1150	4528
93	Aswathanarayana Srinath (IND)	1068	1205	1112	1128	4513
94	Ahmed Al-Bastiki (BRN)	1194	1185	1079	1046	4504
95	Abdrakhman Abinayev (KAZ)	1184	998	1106	1215	4503
96	Hj Yakob Hj Abu Bakar (BRU)	1104	1172	1087	1115	4478
97	Vijay Punjabi (IND)	1054	1066	1237	1089	4446
98	Md Shahwall Hj Mustafa (BRU)	1140	1107	1097	1086	4430
99	Faisal Sugati (KSA)	1067	1127	1047	1173	4414
100	Sergey Sapov (UZB)	1063	1011	1173	1155	4402
101	Khondamir Shaabdurakhmanov (UZB)	1226	991	1071	1100	4388
102	Sethu Madhavan (IND)	1106	1054	1106	1070	4336
103	Makhmut Lazaridi (KAZ)	1093	956	1165	1104	4318
104	Ajay Singh (IND)	1069	1060	1133	1041	4303
105	Mohammad Aizat (BRU)	1096	1117	995	1089	4297
106	Dinesh Kumar (IND)	1049	1054	1095	1080	4278
107	Bakhodir Arifov (UZB)	1009	1134	1080	1003	4226
108	Shavkat Shakasimov (UZB)	1044	1030	1025	1090	4189
109	Kudrat Khilyamov (UZB)	1055	1062	1026	1004	4147
110	German Roshonok (KAZ)	1014	984	1060	1029	4087
111	Oleg Minulin (KAZ)	1022	1052	877	1079	4030
112	Ravshan Abdusamadov (UZB)	961	891	1081	1017	3950
113	Yevgeniy Kuznetsov (KAZ)	992	898	984	1045	3919
114	Lok Hei Ieong (MAC)	1092	1228	1034	0	3354
