= Bowling at the 2006 Asian Games – Men's singles =

Men's singles at the 2006 Asian Games
- Venue: Qatar Bowling Center
- Date: 3 December 2006
- Competitors: 114 from 20 nations

Medalists
gold medal	Ryan Leonard Lalisang	Indonesia
silver medal	Choi Bok-eum	South Korea
bronze medal	Mahmood Al-Attar	United Arab Emirates

The men's singles competition at the 2006 Asian Games in Doha was held on 3 December 2006 at Qatar Bowling Centre.

== Schedule ==
All times are Arabia Standard Time (UTC+03:00)

Date	Time	Event
Sunday, 3 December 2006	17:00	Squad A
Sunday, 3 December 2006	21:00	Squad B

== Results ==
Rank	Athlete	Game						Total
Rank	Athlete	1	2	3	4	5	6	Total
1st place, gold medalist(s)	Ryan Leonard Lalisang (INA)	200	299	245	259	213	226	1442
2nd place, silver medalist(s)	Choi Bok-eum (KOR)	215	247	213	238	248	258	1419
3rd place, bronze medalist(s)	Mahmood Al-Attar (UAE)	243	233	257	247	221	200	1401
4	Yoshinao Masatoki (JPN)	213	228	244	212	213	255	1365
5	Kang Hee-won (KOR)	235	248	237	224	197	218	1359
6	Yannaphon Larpapharat (THA)	203	246	222	214	228	245	1358
7	Mohammed Al-Qubaisi (UAE)	247	207	196	235	235	229	1349
7	Cheng Chao-sheng (TPE)	244	216	193	238	224	234	1349
9	Biboy Rivera (PHI)	191	233	227	203	222	269	1345
10	Khaled Al-Debayyan (KUW)	236	187	208	187	222	279	1319
11	Kairat Baibolatov (KAZ)	267	195	227	222	199	199	1309
12	Fadhel Al-Mousawi (KUW)	194	237	247	219	176	235	1308
13	Hassan Al-Shaikh (KSA)	183	202	216	246	217	239	1303
14	Byun Ho-jin (KOR)	214	215	194	246	216	217	1302
15	Mohamed Al-Shawoosh (BRN)	189	211	208	232	256	205	1301
16	Sithiphol Kunaksorn (THA)	194	241	206	214	186	259	1300
16	Saeed Al-Hajri (QAT)	203	217	225	197	200	258	1300
18	Zulmazran Zulkifli (MAS)	182	225	235	227	217	211	1297
19	Bader Al-Shaikh (KSA)	224	171	244	208	202	245	1294
20	Wang Tien-fu (TPE)	234	204	212	237	201	202	1290
21	Masaaki Takemoto (JPN)	210	224	208	243	186	216	1287
22	Toshihiko Takahashi (JPN)	225	227	222	214	204	191	1283
23	Chen Yung-chuan (TPE)	237	191	214	214	224	198	1278
24	Jasem Al-Saqer (KUW)	224	256	176	221	204	193	1274
25	Dennis Ranova Pulunggono (INA)	181	185	198	237	270	202	1273
26	Alex Liew (MAS)	255	217	196	195	191	216	1270
27	Ben Heng (MAS)	195	225	211	194	222	218	1265
28	Jo Nam-yi (KOR)	184	175	226	217	227	235	1264
29	Lee Yu Wen (SIN)	204	184	211	236	222	204	1261
30	Azidi Ameran (MAS)	226	226	188	189	206	225	1260
31	Jason Yeong-Nathan (SIN)	269	259	207	202	184	137	1258
31	Tomokatsu Yamashita (JPN)	162	227	194	237	245	193	1258
33	Abdulla Al-Qattan (QAT)	201	210	193	236	212	205	1257
33	Wu Siu Hong (HKG)	206	248	197	204	198	204	1257
35	Somjed Kusonphithak (THA)	196	204	236	217	199	201	1253
35	Khalifa Al-Kubaisi (QAT)	222	212	182	221	234	182	1253
37	Remy Ong (SIN)	223	192	193	205	257	179	1249
37	Yusuf Mohamed Falah (BRN)	172	208	217	217	233	202	1249
39	Hussain Nasir Al-Suwaidi (UAE)	219	215	235	196	180	202	1247
40	Nayef Eqab (UAE)	267	227	176	195	165	215	1245
41	Paeng Nepomuceno (PHI)	235	192	208	200	220	189	1244
42	Daniel Lim (MAS)	215	226	186	227	191	196	1241
43	Mohamed Ahmed Mustafa (BRN)	188	213	192	199	226	222	1240
44	Bandar Al-Shafi (QAT)	183	202	237	179	214	224	1239
45	Basel Al-Anzi (KUW)	223	234	190	192	214	185	1238
46	Joung Seoung-joo (KOR)	173	224	184	237	212	207	1237
46	Cyrus Cheung (HKG)	175	214	168	195	216	269	1237
48	Sou Wai Chon (MAC)	188	228	203	183	268	166	1236
49	Chinnapong Chansuk (THA)	226	204	195	145	209	256	1235
50	Daniel Yiu (HKG)	234	188	180	182	192	258	1234
51	Faisal Al-Juraifani (KSA)	198	205	200	191	214	225	1233
52	Choi Io Fai (MAC)	232	189	225	231	182	168	1227
53	Khondamir Shaabdurakhmanov (UZB)	186	208	176	257	212	187	1226
54	Christian Jan Suarez (PHI)	211	267	194	163	180	206	1221
54	Aaron Kong (MAS)	205	186	190	189	221	230	1221
56	Zhang Ye (CHN)	225	216	195	201	208	174	1219
57	Haqi Rumandung (INA)	195	175	193	224	253	178	1218
58	Kao Hai-yuan (TPE)	183	205	215	186	185	243	1217
59	Markwin Tee (PHI)	151	213	244	194	206	202	1210
59	Wang Shizhen (CHN)	214	213	221	200	182	180	1210
61	Lionel Lim (SIN)	213	179	181	233	178	224	1208
62	Park Sang-pil (KOR)	177	185	220	204	216	203	1205
63	Mubarak Al-Merikhi (QAT)	232	218	216	157	188	191	1202
64	Tomoyuki Sasaki (JPN)	191	167	224	221	201	195	1199
65	Shaun Ng (SIN)	184	199	191	202	235	186	1197
66	Jamal Ali Mohammed (UAE)	202	188	201	204	200	201	1196
67	Sayed Ibrahim Al-Hashemi (UAE)	188	200	216	179	209	203	1195
68	Ahmed Al-Bastiki (BRN)	170	199	227	187	245	166	1194
69	Wicky Yeung (HKG)	226	211	166	193	209	188	1193
70	Kot Ka Kit (MAC)	221	184	195	213	171	205	1189
71	Abdrakhman Abinayev (KAZ)	160	183	212	233	191	205	1184
72	Masaru Ito (JPN)	212	202	160	199	194	214	1181
72	Hsieh Yu-ping (TPE)	170	201	213	234	192	171	1181
74	Chester King (PHI)	208	205	214	185	194	172	1178
75	Ahmed Al-Hdyan (KSA)	211	214	175	197	177	199	1173
76	Hameed Taqi (BRN)	170	222	190	212	199	179	1172
77	Cheng Fang-yu (TPE)	169	193	210	190	183	224	1169
78	Jia Ling (CHN)	165	195	182	202	201	222	1167
79	Wang Yingjun (CHN)	200	209	226	173	194	163	1165
80	Carl de Vries (SIN)	176	209	224	146	205	202	1162
81	Yousif Akbar (KSA)	196	206	175	194	188	199	1158
82	Osama Khalfan (BRN)	193	175	205	200	204	180	1157
83	Girish Ashok Gaba (IND)	171	189	200	217	182	195	1154
84	Eric Tseng (HKG)	210	164	222	208	183	162	1149
85	Ahmed Shahin Al-Merikhi (QAT)	183	186	209	172	203	195	1148
86	Van Ka Kei (MAC)	210	198	188	171	207	168	1142
87	Md Shahwall Hj Mustafa (BRU)	193	171	204	168	191	213	1140
88	Hengki Susanto (INA)	173	186	245	165	184	185	1138
89	Tyrone Ongpauco (PHI)	202	157	159	192	224	191	1125
90	Rakan Al-Ameeri (KUW)	214	181	175	206	186	160	1122
91	Edwin Lioe (INA)	174	193	176	197	201	172	1113
92	Sethu Madhavan (IND)	205	185	170	179	168	199	1106
93	Hj Yakob Hj Abu Bakar (BRU)	213	177	198	173	155	188	1104
94	Ng Cheng Chok (MAC)	191	159	202	170	169	212	1103
95	Rudy Goenawan (INA)	186	214	200	180	169	151	1100
96	Wang Bin (CHN)	214	206	171	190	159	158	1098
97	Mohammad Aizat (BRU)	152	194	201	172	189	188	1096
98	Michael Tsang (HKG)	171	166	162	202	190	203	1094
99	Makhmut Lazaridi (KAZ)	175	182	167	179	152	238	1093
100	Lok Hei Ieong (MAC)	235	180	190	156	160	171	1092
101	Mohammad Al-Regeebah (KUW)	179	155	209	170	170	193	1076
102	Ajay Singh (IND)	179	175	162	222	167	164	1069
103	Aswathanarayana Srinath (IND)	199	164	171	186	185	163	1068
104	Faisal Sugati (KSA)	162	155	200	190	212	148	1067
105	Sergey Sapov (UZB)	169	169	187	156	192	190	1063
106	Kudrat Khilyamov (UZB)	158	164	180	179	225	149	1055
107	Vijay Punjabi (IND)	221	168	172	163	165	165	1054
108	Dinesh Kumar (IND)	150	184	178	180	203	154	1049
109	Shavkat Shakasimov (UZB)	196	177	171	189	158	153	1044
110	Oleg Minulin (KAZ)	212	135	151	154	191	179	1022
111	German Roshonok (KAZ)	148	136	201	200	158	171	1014
112	Bakhodir Arifov (UZB)	163	157	157	205	163	164	1009
113	Yevgeniy Kuznetsov (KAZ)	176	160	182	175	158	141	992
114	Ravshan Abdusamadov (UZB)	150	169	169	139	156	178	961
