= Bowling at the 2014 Asian Games – Men's trios =

2014 men's trio bowling competition

Men's trios at the 2014 Asian Games
- Venue: Anyang Hogye Gymnasium
- Date: 27–28 September 2014
- Competitors: 99 from 17 nations

Medalists
gold medal	Japan; Tomoyuki Sasaki, Shogo Wada, Shusaku Asato
silver medal	Malaysia; Syafiq Ridhwan, Timmy Tan, Zulmazran Zulkifli
bronze medal	South Korea; Kim Kyung-min, Park Jong-woo, Choi Bok-eum

The men's trios competition at the 2014 Asian Games in Incheon was held on 27 and 28 September 2014 at Anyang Hogye Gymnasium.

== Schedule ==
All times are Korea Standard Time (UTC+09:00)

Date	Time	Event
Saturday, 27 September 2014	09:00	1st block
Sunday, 28 September 2014	13:30	2nd block

== Results ==
Rank	Team	Game						Total
Rank	Team	1	2	3	4	5	6	Total
1st place, gold medalist(s)	Japan 1 (JPN)	584	622	709	629	706	631	3881
	Tomoyuki Sasaki	198	175	255	204	214	184	1230
	Shogo Wada	211	222	213	252	246	198	1342
	Shusaku Asato	175	225	241	173	246	249	1309
2nd place, silver medalist(s)	Malaysia 2 (MAS)	567	624	692	602	719	597	3801
	Syafiq Ridhwan	169	213	216	203	257	209	1267
	Timmy Tan	187	228	223	221	244	197	1300
	Zulmazran Zulkifli	211	183	253	178	218	191	1234
3rd place, bronze medalist(s)	South Korea 2 (KOR)	602	584	585	635	693	616	3715
	Kim Kyung-min	194	206	196	208	222	198	1224
	Park Jong-woo	204	197	213	221	226	197	1258
	Choi Bok-eum	204	181	176	206	245	221	1233
4	Singapore 2 (SIN)	613	673	564	681	535	635	3701
	Keith Saw	210	178	194	268	166	236	1252
	Ng Chiew Pang	167	279	183	198	195	174	1196
	Justin Lim	236	216	187	215	174	225	1253
5	Thailand 1 (THA)	547	643	625	629	668	584	3696
	Annop Arromsaranon	180	246	222	213	206	148	1215
	Sithiphol Kunaksorn	190	173	168	194	236	211	1172
	Yannaphon Larpapharat	177	224	235	222	226	225	1309
6	Hong Kong 2 (HKG)	661	507	657	606	622	637	3690
	Eric Tseng	220	149	236	210	194	202	1211
	Wu Siu Hong	235	180	193	210	236	213	1267
	Michael Mak	206	178	228	186	192	222	1212
7	Indonesia 2 (INA)	570	555	584	578	694	705	3686
	Ryan Leonard Lalisang	182	170	181	223	236	289	1281
	Yeri Ramadona	186	227	202	183	200	213	1211
	Hardy Rachmadian	202	158	201	172	258	203	1194
7	Japan 2 (JPN)	600	573	602	707	608	596	3686
	Daisuke Yoshida	205	183	199	202	171	198	1158
	Toshihiko Takahashi	192	200	248	259	210	213	1322
	Yoshinao Masatoki	203	190	155	246	227	185	1206
9	Philippines 1 (PHI)	606	633	580	616	627	596	3658
	Frederick Ong	192	190	203	198	223	185	1191
	Kenneth Chua	180	224	192	228	224	190	1238
	Biboy Rivera	234	219	185	190	180	221	1229
10	Malaysia 1 (MAS)	585	580	598	593	632	652	3640
	Adrian Ang	211	198	210	202	228	196	1245
	Muhammad Rafiq Ismail	191	177	205	198	179	234	1184
	Alex Liew	183	205	183	193	225	222	1211
11	South Korea 1 (KOR)	676	621	574	544	594	577	3586
	Shin Seung-hyeon	191	202	200	184	215	161	1153
	Hong Hae-sol	226	236	168	176	170	171	1147
	Kang Hee-won	259	183	206	184	209	245	1286
12	Qatar 2 (QAT)	584	586	618	567	600	577	3532
	Yousef Al-Jaber	190	248	195	207	170	187	1197
	Khalid Al-Dosari	204	165	176	165	227	203	1140
	Mubarak Al-Merikhi	190	173	247	195	203	187	1195
13	Philippines 2 (PHI)	567	625	583	597	603	544	3519
	Enrico Hernandez	181	210	207	211	190	180	1179
	Jomar Jumapao	221	213	208	179	201	186	1208
	Benshir Layoso	165	202	168	207	212	178	1132
14	Kuwait 2 (KUW)	544	593	586	601	606	558	3488
	Basel Al-Anzi	177	220	186	201	200	154	1138
	Abdullah Ahmad	191	200	212	204	196	191	1194
	Jasem Al-Saqer	176	173	188	196	210	213	1156
15	United Arab Emirates 2 (UAE)	535	572	545	603	645	571	3471
	Hussain Nasir Al-Suwaidi	155	170	171	237	216	176	1125
	Nayef Eqab	189	186	196	202	202	185	1160
	Shaker Ali Al-Hassan	191	216	178	164	227	210	1186
16	Macau 1 (MAC)	551	599	614	561	525	619	3469
	Lee Tak Man	181	218	202	200	172	226	1199
	Zoe Dias Ma	175	216	178	185	171	202	1127
	Choi Io Fai	195	165	234	176	182	191	1143
17	Indonesia 1 (INA)	579	528	555	617	615	562	3456
	Billy Muhammad Islam	152	167	213	211	215	199	1157
	Diwan Rezaldy	236	195	189	219	211	200	1250
	Adhiguna Widiantoro	191	166	153	187	189	163	1049
18	Kuwait 1 (KUW)	581	567	559	640	566	535	3448
	Rakan Al-Ameeri	192	164	188	233	199	191	1167
	Mostafa Al-Mousawi	178	202	195	191	196	128	1090
	Yaqoub Al-Shatti	211	201	176	216	171	216	1191
19	China 2 (CHN)	580	588	567	584	520	597	3436
	Du Jianchao	204	194	195	165	167	204	1129
	Mi Zhongli	182	198	179	214	160	188	1121
	Wang Zhiyong	194	196	193	205	193	205	1186
20	United Arab Emirates 1 (UAE)	576	527	615	631	546	539	3434
	Mahmood Al-Attar	205	167	181	279	185	184	1201
	Mohamed Al-Marzooqi	168	200	223	165	176	173	1105
	Hareb Al-Mansoori	203	160	211	187	185	182	1128
21	China 1 (CHN)	616	516	547	511	515	660	3365
	Qi Wankang	196	159	217	189	175	166	1102
	Wang Shizhen	206	190	167	169	190	269	1191
	Yang Wei	214	167	163	153	150	225	1072
22	Saudi Arabia 2 (KSA)	528	559	623	518	493	635	3356
	Mohammed Al-Saud	167	181	193	156	148	206	1051
	Abdullah Al-Dolijan	159	167	172	191	177	225	1091
	Bader Al-Shaikh	202	211	258	171	168	204	1214
23	Saudi Arabia 1 (KSA)	568	526	534	539	542	599	3308
	Adel Al-Bariqi	217	165	207	151	201	179	1120
	Yasser Abulreesh	145	180	150	198	164	205	1042
	Talal Al-Towireb	206	181	177	190	177	215	1146
24	Singapore 1 (SIN)	544	545	512	616	588	477	3282
	Javier Tan	193	196	185	175	165	167	1081
	Joel Tan	159	202	155	185	232	143	1076
	Jaris Goh	192	147	172	256	191	167	1125
25	Hong Kong 1 (HKG)	571	528	513	538	568	549	3267
	Kam Siu Lun	204	233	146	184	193	181	1141
	Wicky Yeung	200	152	210	223	222	154	1161
	Chan Yat Long	167	143	157	131	153	214	965
26	Qatar 1 (QAT)	568	561	506	512	543	573	3263
	Jassim Al-Merikhi	152	191	197	143	231	234	1148
	Ahmed Al-Deyab	219	172	143	180	137	179	1030
	Jassem Al-Deyab	197	198	166	189	175	160	1085
27	Vietnam 2 (VIE)	490	498	548	545	579	545	3205
	Lê Anh Tuấn	174	170	170	149	183	182	1028
	Phạm Quốc Bảo Kỳ	145	160	165	194	196	181	1041
	Nguyễn Thành Phố	171	168	213	202	200	182	1136
28	Macau 2 (MAC)	560	516	479	507	543	562	3167
	Tam Tsz Sun	205	133	132	158	213	213	1054
	Man Si Kei	195	199	173	163	163	161	1054
	Chan Kam Seng	160	184	174	186	167	188	1059
29	Mongolia 2 (MGL)	514	469	436	560	531	560	3070
	Bayaraagiin Batmönkh	153	153	132	188	159	201	986
	Jamtsyn Sodnomdorj	169	166	146	221	168	174	1044
	Miyesengyn Tüvshinsanaa	192	150	158	151	204	185	1040
30	Mongolia 1 (MGL)	435	527	506	500	547	512	3027
	Dondovyn Zorigt	177	173	162	177	179	161	1029
	Ganboldyn Altangerel	131	157	153	167	162	177	947
	Tseveen-Ochiryn Batjargal	127	197	191	156	206	174	1051
31	Uzbekistan 2 (UZB)	442	425	515	537	404	577	2900
	Viktor Smirnov	153	133	175	157	134	229	981
	Bakhodir Arifov	139	139	159	184	135	191	947
	Fayzulla Nasirov	150	153	181	196	135	157	972
32	Uzbekistan 1 (UZB)	530	442	453	488	487	465	2865
	Bakhtiyor Dalabaev	189	134	189	164	184	150	1010
	Sergey Sapov	153	162	138	159	141	169	922
	Kudrat Khilyamov	188	146	126	165	162	146	933
33	Vietnam 1 (VIE)	324	434	275	366	378	327	2104
	Lê Hồng Minh	118	200	114	145	186	143	906
	Đào Xuân Phúc	206	234	161	221	192	184	1198
	Phạm Gia Phú	0	0	0	0	0	0	0
Individuals
	Atittarat Cheng (THA)	176	169	168	242	203	187	1145
	Panuruj Vilailak (THA)	189	149	200	246	189	184	1157
	Ihab Al-Hashimi (YEM)	135	178	130	181	157	158	939
	Saeed Al-Hushail (YEM)	0	0	0	0	0	0	0
