= Bowling at the 2014 Asian Games – Men's singles =

Athletic competition

Men's singles at the 2014 Asian Games
- Venue: Anyang Hogye Gymnasium
- Date: 23 September 2014
- Competitors: 103 from 18 nations

Medalists
gold medal	Yannaphon Larpapharat	Thailand
silver medal	Du Jianchao	China
bronze medal	Sithiphol Kunaksorn	Thailand

The men's singles competition at the 2014 Asian Games in Incheon was held on 23 September 2014 at Anyang Hogye Gymnasium.

== Schedule ==
All times are Korea Standard Time (UTC+09:00)

Date	Time	Event
Tuesday, 23 September 2014	09:00	Squad A
Tuesday, 23 September 2014	14:30	Squad B

== Results ==
Rank	Athlete	Game						Total
Rank	Athlete	1	2	3	4	5	6	Total
1st place, gold medalist(s)	Yannaphon Larpapharat (THA)	222	203	199	234	216	245	1319
2nd place, silver medalist(s)	Du Jianchao (CHN)	224	223	212	202	237	202	1300
3rd place, bronze medalist(s)	Sithiphol Kunaksorn (THA)	210	244	245	212	216	172	1299
4	Zulmazran Zulkifli (MAS)	233	187	235	203	226	214	1298
5	Annop Arromsaranon (THA)	207	181	206	214	227	238	1273
6	Park Jong-woo (KOR)	175	258	227	234	184	191	1269
7	Wu Siu Hong (HKG)	188	224	228	235	153	238	1266
8	Shin Seung-hyeon (KOR)	217	187	185	219	248	207	1263
9	Kim Kyung-min (KOR)	181	247	201	204	189	238	1260
10	Wang Zhiyong (CHN)	216	163	225	195	211	247	1257
11	Ryan Leonard Lalisang (INA)	204	190	255	232	195	177	1253
12	Nayef Eqab (UAE)	160	203	220	214	215	227	1239
13	Hussain Nasir Al-Suwaidi (UAE)	187	232	196	188	231	200	1234
14	Choi Bok-eum (KOR)	233	220	192	203	200	183	1231
15	Bakhtiyor Dalabaev (UZB)	223	180	223	197	216	191	1230
15	Shaker Ali Al-Hassan (UAE)	185	235	207	185	205	213	1230
17	Hong Hae-sol (KOR)	167	206	227	233	198	198	1229
18	Frederick Ong (PHI)	268	199	192	205	201	163	1228
19	Jasem Al-Saqer (KUW)	178	197	252	196	197	205	1225
20	Shogo Wada (JPN)	200	203	182	232	215	189	1221
21	Billy Muhammad Islam (INA)	214	203	213	156	226	206	1218
22	Yeri Ramadona (INA)	205	247	155	226	191	192	1216
23	Enrico Hernandez (PHI)	186	191	204	224	221	189	1215
24	Muhammad Rafiq Ismail (MAS)	210	209	190	204	183	216	1212
25	Adrian Ang (MAS)	234	184	193	226	202	169	1208
26	Kang Hee-won (KOR)	222	172	170	258	221	164	1207
27	Yang Wei (CHN)	223	173	205	198	205	202	1206
28	Bader Al-Shaikh (KSA)	216	195	195	166	200	233	1205
29	Yoshinao Masatoki (JPN)	215	185	181	191	216	213	1201
30	Yasser Abulreesh (KSA)	177	184	227	234	184	194	1200
31	Jassim Al-Merikhi (QAT)	213	204	228	158	167	229	1199
32	Michael Mak (HKG)	186	193	216	239	201	160	1195
32	Syafiq Ridhwan (MAS)	192	192	209	190	205	207	1195
34	Jassem Al-Deyab (QAT)	177	196	236	189	215	175	1188
34	Ahmed Al-Deyab (QAT)	177	178	259	202	173	199	1188
36	Yaqoub Al-Shatti (KUW)	155	215	184	213	227	192	1186
37	Atittarat Cheng (THA)	225	220	169	225	172	173	1184
38	Justin Lim (SIN)	176	229	202	204	224	148	1183
38	Ng Chiew Pang (SIN)	205	187	178	215	180	218	1183
38	Yousef Al-Jaber (QAT)	166	177	222	220	215	183	1183
41	Toshihiko Takahashi (JPN)	228	193	243	141	171	205	1181
42	Timmy Tan (MAS)	191	191	221	182	213	182	1180
42	Jaris Goh (SIN)	184	191	185	237	181	202	1180
44	Keith Saw (SIN)	177	213	179	232	212	163	1176
45	Khalid Al-Dosari (QAT)	193	169	199	180	232	202	1175
46	Tomoyuki Sasaki (JPN)	211	224	201	197	158	183	1174
47	Mostafa Al-Mousawi (KUW)	225	179	208	244	151	165	1172
48	Hardy Rachmadian (INA)	212	201	165	164	194	235	1171
48	Kenneth Chua (PHI)	223	160	204	191	203	190	1171
50	Alex Liew (MAS)	192	196	182	208	215	177	1170
51	Abdullah Al-Dolijan (KSA)	191	176	200	224	175	203	1169
52	Mi Zhongli (CHN)	183	213	190	190	200	192	1168
53	Adhiguna Widiantoro (INA)	210	184	196	201	201	169	1161
54	Benshir Layoso (PHI)	177	190	185	186	232	190	1160
55	Biboy Rivera (PHI)	211	183	185	198	176	205	1158
56	Mubarak Al-Merikhi (QAT)	198	165	200	202	177	211	1153
57	Diwan Rezaldy (INA)	199	205	167	180	181	215	1147
58	Rakan Al-Ameeri (KUW)	205	199	181	231	162	167	1145
58	Zoe Dias Ma (MAC)	174	170	215	237	174	175	1145
60	Bakhodir Arifov (UZB)	201	179	155	185	214	208	1142
61	Mohammed Al-Saud (KSA)	168	211	224	162	168	208	1141
62	Panuruj Vilailak (THA)	191	222	182	204	168	169	1136
63	Eric Tseng (HKG)	167	177	231	198	189	172	1134
64	Kam Siu Lun (HKG)	211	157	183	221	182	179	1133
65	Hareb Al-Mansoori (UAE)	158	244	170	202	179	178	1131
66	Bayaraagiin Batmönkh (MGL)	154	219	183	160	177	234	1127
67	Wicky Yeung (HKG)	194	240	166	146	223	157	1126
68	Ihab Al-Hashimi (YEM)	169	160	200	191	167	233	1120
69	Joel Tan (SIN)	184	200	181	201	187	162	1115
70	Lee Tak Man (MAC)	152	232	181	200	170	177	1112
71	Abdullah Ahmad (KUW)	193	188	181	169	184	196	1111
71	Wang Shizhen (CHN)	184	182	203	206	152	184	1111
71	Mahmood Al-Attar (UAE)	222	150	193	190	192	164	1111
74	Chan Yat Long (HKG)	142	153	233	182	213	179	1102
75	Nguyễn Thành Phố (VIE)	212	170	170	160	155	234	1101
76	Jomar Jumapao (PHI)	160	152	209	207	166	204	1098
77	Sergey Sapov (UZB)	193	188	181	174	170	188	1094
78	Javier Tan (SIN)	176	195	169	190	218	143	1091
79	Daisuke Yoshida (JPN)	192	149	159	189	178	223	1090
80	Talal Al-Towireb (KSA)	163	167	230	170	192	167	1089
81	Jamtsyn Sodnomdorj (MGL)	161	169	185	197	197	175	1084
82	Miyesengyn Tüvshinsanaa (MGL)	148	197	172	209	166	182	1074
83	Phạm Quốc Bảo Kỳ (VIE)	214	201	159	147	180	166	1067
84	Shusaku Asato (JPN)	165	205	171	179	156	184	1060
85	Adel Al-Bariqi (KSA)	170	190	182	171	154	184	1051
85	Qi Wankang (CHN)	174	130	200	178	194	175	1051
87	Man Si Kei (MAC)	152	176	187	215	170	150	1050
87	Basel Al-Anzi (KUW)	187	169	143	177	196	178	1050
89	Choi Io Fai (MAC)	150	156	205	193	158	186	1048
90	Chan Kam Seng (MAC)	170	196	182	157	160	176	1041
91	Tseveen-Ochiryn Batjargal (MGL)	153	159	182	192	150	203	1039
92	Đào Xuân Phúc (VIE)	210	161	161	205	150	148	1035
93	Viktor Smirnov (UZB)	154	165	183	191	199	140	1032
94	Fayzulla Nasirov (UZB)	177	137	211	147	157	183	1012
95	Tam Tsz Sun (MAC)	198	179	155	163	143	169	1007
95	Mohamed Al-Marzooqi (UAE)	184	145	177	167	199	135	1007
97	Saeed Al-Hushail (YEM)	138	192	147	184	168	149	978
98	Dondovyn Zorigt (MGL)	173	169	156	146	171	160	975
99	Lê Anh Tuấn (VIE)	139	170	166	144	169	184	972
100	Ganboldyn Altangerel (MGL)	164	179	149	166	171	118	947
101	Kudrat Khilyamov (UZB)	150	156	156	157	139	180	938
102	Lê Hồng Minh (VIE)	118	142	159	163	139	215	936
103	Phạm Gia Phú (VIE)	0	0	0	0	0	0	0
