= Bowling at the 2014 Asian Games – Men's doubles =

Men's doubles at the 2014 Asian Games
- Venue: Anyang Hogye Gymnasium
- Date: 25 September 2014
- Competitors: 102 from 18 nations

Medalists
gold medal	Toshihiko Takahashi; Yoshinao Masatoki	Japan
silver medal	Tomoyuki Sasaki; Daisuke Yoshida	Japan
bronze medal	Billy Muhammad Islam; Hardy Rachmadian	Indonesia

The men's doubles competition at the 2014 Asian Games in Incheon was held on 25 September 2014 at Anyang Hogye Gymnasium.

== Schedule ==
All times are Korea Standard Time (UTC+09:00)

Date	Time	Event
Thursday, 25 September 2014	09:00	Squad A
Thursday, 25 September 2014	14:30	Squad B

== Results ==
Rank	Team	Game						Total
Rank	Team	1	2	3	4	5	6	Total
1st place, gold medalist(s)	Japan 3 (JPN)	354	415	487	471	422	384	2533
	Toshihiko Takahashi	155	218	228	237	235	192	1265
	Yoshinao Masatoki	199	197	259	234	187	192	1268
2nd place, silver medalist(s)	Japan 1 (JPN)	398	408	354	425	435	482	2502
	Tomoyuki Sasaki	219	210	148	202	214	226	1219
	Daisuke Yoshida	179	198	206	223	221	256	1283
3rd place, bronze medalist(s)	Indonesia 3 (INA)	446	425	409	423	338	448	2489
	Billy Muhammad Islam	225	234	202	202	179	233	1275
	Hardy Rachmadian	221	191	207	221	159	215	1214
4	United Arab Emirates 1 (UAE)	408	368	427	426	428	404	2461
	Hussain Nasir Al-Suwaidi	209	166	214	215	222	244	1270
	Nayef Eqab	199	202	213	211	206	160	1191
5	United Arab Emirates 3 (UAE)	384	372	407	419	461	387	2430
	Hareb Al-Mansoori	152	172	207	191	243	184	1149
	Shaker Ali Al-Hassan	232	200	200	228	218	203	1281
6	South Korea 1 (KOR)	346	445	411	461	419	345	2427
	Choi Bok-eum	178	219	200	236	224	157	1214
	Park Jong-woo	168	226	211	225	195	188	1213
7	Indonesia 2 (INA)	423	444	423	323	407	405	2425
	Ryan Leonard Lalisang	204	243	226	143	206	222	1244
	Yeri Ramadona	219	201	197	180	201	183	1181
8	Singapore 3 (SIN)	407	392	443	406	372	402	2422
	Joel Tan	187	205	201	213	171	182	1159
	Justin Lim	220	187	242	193	201	220	1263
9	Malaysia 1 (MAS)	386	368	422	439	403	396	2414
	Muhammad Rafiq Ismail	172	179	227	246	185	213	1222
	Alex Liew	214	189	195	193	218	183	1192
10	China 2 (CHN)	355	365	394	457	398	444	2413
	Mi Zhongli	169	210	190	255	185	224	1233
	Wang Zhiyong	186	155	204	202	213	220	1180
11	China 1 (CHN)	426	345	382	373	441	439	2406
	Wang Shizhen	191	157	225	195	247	215	1230
	Qi Wankang	235	188	157	178	194	224	1176
12	South Korea 3 (KOR)	392	407	414	418	406	355	2392
	Kim Kyung-min	200	224	206	218	220	188	1256
	Hong Hae-sol	192	183	208	200	186	167	1136
13	Hong Kong 3 (HKG)	356	353	431	409	429	408	2386
	Wu Siu Hong	176	176	247	232	208	209	1248
	Michael Mak	180	177	184	177	221	199	1138
14	Japan 2 (JPN)	393	406	395	446	395	338	2373
	Shogo Wada	184	184	211	210	159	167	1115
	Shusaku Asato	209	222	184	236	236	171	1258
15	Qatar 3 (QAT)	435	412	329	376	407	407	2366
	Jassim Al-Merikhi	193	233	147	183	193	213	1162
	Ahmed Al-Deyab	242	179	182	193	214	194	1204
16	Qatar 1 (QAT)	417	370	430	365	380	388	2350
	Jassem Al-Deyab	195	147	240	194	235	206	1217
	Khalid Al-Dosari	222	223	190	171	145	182	1133
17	Philippines 2 (PHI)	332	321	391	440	479	386	2349
	Frederick Ong	159	159	203	213	258	226	1218
	Enrico Hernandez	173	162	188	227	221	160	1131
18	Qatar 2 (QAT)	392	440	374	350	428	364	2348
	Yousef Al-Jaber	204	213	176	175	208	192	1168
	Mubarak Al-Merikhi	188	227	198	175	220	172	1180
19	Hong Kong 2 (HKG)	378	435	394	358	330	449	2344
	Kam Siu Lun	164	211	197	176	195	257	1200
	Chan Yat Long	214	224	197	182	135	192	1144
20	South Korea 2 (KOR)	337	352	373	474	402	389	2327
	Shin Seung-hyeon	167	176	179	236	184	198	1140
	Kang Hee-won	170	176	194	238	218	191	1187
21	Philippines 3 (PHI)	383	342	418	370	374	438	2325
	Kenneth Chua	171	170	225	190	176	204	1136
	Biboy Rivera	212	172	193	180	198	234	1189
22	Malaysia 3 (MAS)	380	367	390	371	369	447	2324
	Syafiq Ridhwan	204	154	226	195	167	215	1161
	Zulmazran Zulkifli	176	213	164	176	202	232	1163
23	Singapore 1 (SIN)	442	321	414	391	402	351	2321
	Javier Tan	199	156	201	225	211	170	1162
	Ng Chiew Pang	243	165	213	166	191	181	1159
24	Indonesia 1 (INA)	363	340	414	413	354	435	2319
	Diwan Rezaldy	200	192	255	256	199	220	1322
	Adhiguna Widiantoro	163	148	159	157	155	215	997
25	Malaysia 2 (MAS)	397	374	424	320	420	380	2315
	Adrian Ang	185	216	208	158	216	155	1138
	Timmy Tan	212	158	216	162	204	225	1177
26	Hong Kong 1 (HKG)	359	426	327	412	382	379	2285
	Wicky Yeung	188	246	157	201	187	190	1169
	Eric Tseng	171	180	170	211	195	189	1116
27	Macau 3 (MAC)	368	427	396	356	355	376	2278
	Lee Tak Man	204	235	218	199	157	174	1187
	Zoe Dias Ma	164	192	178	157	198	202	1091
28	Singapore 2 (SIN)	314	383	354	446	379	392	2268
	Keith Saw	164	167	184	223	158	234	1130
	Jaris Goh	150	216	170	223	221	158	1138
29	Thailand 2 (THA)	406	380	355	392	353	381	2267
	Sithiphol Kunaksorn	221	202	156	190	167	196	1132
	Yannaphon Larpapharat	185	178	199	202	186	185	1135
30	Saudi Arabia 3 (KSA)	355	372	368	386	381	404	2266
	Abdullah Al-Dolijan	165	194	170	163	179	218	1089
	Bader Al-Shaikh	190	178	198	223	202	186	1177
31	Kuwait 3 (KUW)	333	419	393	354	357	402	2258
	Abdullah Ahmad	176	222	223	156	186	226	1189
	Basel Al-Anzi	157	197	170	198	171	176	1069
32	Macau 2 (MAC)	353	410	368	348	418	349	2246
	Chan Kam Seng	173	203	194	180	182	147	1079
	Choi Io Fai	180	207	174	168	236	202	1167
33	Thailand 1 (THA)	398	357	376	364	371	373	2239
	Annop Arromsaranon	194	151	173	170	180	188	1056
	Atittarat Cheng	204	206	203	194	191	185	1183
34	Kuwait 1 (KUW)	365	381	419	412	342	316	2235
	Mostafa Al-Mousawi	171	211	204	205	164	149	1104
	Yaqoub Al-Shatti	194	170	215	207	178	167	1131
35	Saudi Arabia 2 (KSA)	373	396	395	351	351	353	2219
	Adel Al-Bariqi	160	208	196	162	167	175	1068
	Talal Al-Towireb	213	188	199	189	184	178	1151
36	China 3 (CHN)	384	345	389	330	412	353	2213
	Du Jianchao	202	165	225	161	203	182	1138
	Yang Wei	182	180	164	169	209	171	1075
37	Yemen 1 (YEM)	316	413	346	384	352	373	2184
	Saeed Al-Hushail	145	167	200	202	181	149	1044
	Ihab Al-Hashimi	171	246	146	182	171	224	1140
38	Macau 1 (MAC)	361	358	333	386	343	392	2173
	Tam Tsz Sun	193	194	180	204	212	227	1210
	Man Si Kei	168	164	153	182	131	165	963
39	Philippines 1 (PHI)	360	367	371	331	380	360	2169
	Jomar Jumapao	193	202	205	140	183	178	1101
	Benshir Layoso	167	165	166	191	197	182	1068
39	Vietnam 3 (VIE)	354	436	355	344	305	375	2169
	Lê Anh Tuấn	169	194	184	193	149	179	1068
	Phạm Quốc Bảo Kỳ	185	242	171	151	156	196	1101
41	Uzbekistan 2 (UZB)	331	324	406	365	372	365	2163
	Sergey Sapov	160	178	244	181	204	199	1166
	Viktor Smirnov	171	146	162	184	168	166	997
42	Kuwait 2 (KUW)	359	410	358	315	342	364	2148
	Jasem Al-Saqer	195	198	189	175	157	196	1110
	Rakan Al-Ameeri	164	212	169	140	185	168	1038
43	Uzbekistan 3 (UZB)	327	346	337	363	394	368	2135
	Bakhodir Arifov	156	163	156	189	238	198	1100
	Fayzulla Nasirov	171	183	181	174	156	170	1035
44	Saudi Arabia 1 (KSA)	320	324	370	385	339	354	2092
	Yasser Abulreesh	153	171	188	161	160	177	1010
	Mohammed Al-Saud	167	153	182	224	179	177	1082
45	Uzbekistan 1 (UZB)	314	358	301	308	404	387	2072
	Kudrat Khilyamov	159	180	148	148	181	170	986
	Bakhtiyor Dalabaev	155	178	153	160	223	217	1086
46	United Arab Emirates 2 (UAE)	348	376	362	370	287	325	2068
	Mahmood Al-Attar	153	189	184	199	164	155	1044
	Mohamed Al-Marzooqi	195	187	178	171	123	170	1024
47	Mongolia 1 (MGL)	306	342	364	367	316	292	1987
	Bayaraagiin Batmönkh	168	158	176	172	152	158	984
	Jamtsyn Sodnomdorj	138	184	188	195	164	134	1003
48	Vietnam 2 (VIE)	313	312	278	359	299	378	1939
	Đào Xuân Phúc	152	163	145	180	149	152	941
	Nguyễn Thành Phố	161	149	133	179	150	226	998
49	Mongolia 3 (MGL)	367	301	349	260	269	323	1869
	Dondovyn Zorigt	200	164	213	144	140	166	1027
	Ganboldyn Altangerel	167	137	136	116	129	157	842
50	Vietnam 1 (VIE)	154	128	170	174	145	135	906
	Lê Hồng Minh	154	128	170	174	145	135	906
	Phạm Gia Phú	0	0	0	0	0	0	0
51	Mongolia 2 (MGL)	0	0	0	0	0	0	0
	Miyesengyn Tüvshinsanaa	0	0	0	0	0	0	0
	Tseveen-Ochiryn Batjargal	0	0	0	0	0	0	0
Individuals
	Panuruj Vilailak (THA)	159	135	232	184	180	144	1034
