= Bowling at the 2006 Asian Games – Men's team =

Men's team of 5 at the 2006 Asian Games
- Venue: Qatar Bowling Center
- Date: 7–8 December 2006
- Competitors: 107 from 18 nations

Medalists
| gold medal | Japan; Toshihiko Takahashi, Masaaki Takemoto, Tomoyuki Sasaki, Tomokatsu Yamashita, Masaru Ito, Yoshinao Masatoki |
| silver medal | South Korea; Choi Bok-eum, Joung Seoung-joo, Byun Ho-jin, Kang Hee-won, Jo Nam-yi, Park Sang-pil |
| bronze medal | Saudi Arabia; Hassan Al-Shaikh, Bader Al-Shaikh, Faisal Al-Juraifani, Ahmed Al-Hdyan, Yousif Akbar, Faisal Sugati |

The men's team of five competition at the 2006 Asian Games in Doha was held on 7 and 8 December 2006 at Qatar Bowling Centre.

== Schedule ==
All times are Arabia Standard Time (UTC+03:00)

| Date | Time | Event |
|---|---|---|
| Thursday, 7 December 2006 | 09:00 | First Block |
| Friday, 8 December 2006 | 13:30 | Second block |

== Results ==
| Rank | Team | Game | | | | | | Total |
| Rank | Team | 1 | 2 | 3 | 4 | 5 | 6 | Total |
|---|---|---|---|---|---|---|---|---|
| 1st place, gold medalist(s) | Japan (JPN) | 997 | 1055 | 1025 | 1234 | 1136 | 1132 | 6579 |
| | Toshihiko Takahashi | 212 | 246 | 224 | 236 | 223 | 201 | 1342 |
| | Masaaki Takemoto | 206 | 222 | 179 | 229 | 204 | 227 | 1267 |
| | Tomoyuki Sasaki | | | | 279 | 266 | 202 | 747 |
| | Tomokatsu Yamashita | 199 | 183 | 213 | 245 | 225 | 258 | 1323 |
| | Masaru Ito | 188 | 210 | 188 | 245 | 218 | 244 | 1293 |
| | Yoshinao Masatoki | 192 | 194 | 221 | | | | 607 |
| 2nd place, silver medalist(s) | South Korea (KOR) | 1132 | 1107 | 1099 | 987 | 1075 | 1028 | 6428 |
| | Choi Bok-eum | 199 | 246 | 226 | 256 | 166 | 234 | 1327 |
| | Joung Seoung-joo | 267 | 203 | 226 | 203 | 193 | 189 | 1281 |
| | Byun Ho-jin | | | | 174 | 257 | 222 | 653 |
| | Kang Hee-won | 233 | 224 | 166 | 186 | 202 | 168 | 1179 |
| | Jo Nam-yi | 241 | 200 | 266 | 168 | 257 | 215 | 1347 |
| | Park Sang-pil | 192 | 234 | 215 | | | | 641 |
| 3rd place, bronze medalist(s) | Saudi Arabia (KSA) | 1013 | 1090 | 993 | 1124 | 1067 | 1062 | 6349 |
| | Hassan Al-Shaikh | 216 | 233 | 197 | 226 | 205 | 202 | 1279 |
| | Bader Al-Shaikh | 225 | 278 | 197 | 257 | 213 | 244 | 1414 |
| | Faisal Al-Juraifani | 213 | 194 | 171 | 209 | 226 | 200 | 1213 |
| | Ahmed Al-Hdyan | 169 | 198 | 213 | 227 | 202 | 222 | 1231 |
| | Yousif Akbar | 190 | 187 | 215 | 205 | 221 | 194 | 1212 |
| 4 | Singapore (SIN) | 1049 | 970 | 1015 | 1082 | 1165 | 1065 | 6346 |
| | Lee Yu Wen | 204 | 178 | 195 | 221 | 213 | 221 | 1232 |
| | Carl de Vries | | | | 150 | 268 | 192 | 610 |
| | Jason Yeong-Nathan | 178 | 198 | 180 | 258 | 192 | 218 | 1224 |
| | Shaun Ng | 286 | 189 | 219 | 258 | 248 | 211 | 1411 |
| | Remy Ong | 213 | 245 | 209 | 195 | 244 | 223 | 1329 |
| | Lionel Lim | 168 | 160 | 212 | | | | 540 |
| 5 | Malaysia (MAS) | 934 | 1182 | 976 | 1071 | 1066 | 1103 | 6332 |
| | Daniel Lim | | | | 266 | 171 | 198 | 635 |
| | Zulmazran Zulkifli | 165 | 203 | 180 | 222 | 225 | 210 | 1205 |
| | Alex Liew | 193 | 223 | 189 | 176 | 254 | 217 | 1252 |
| | Ben Heng | 188 | 245 | 223 | 197 | 225 | 209 | 1287 |
| | Aaron Kong | 195 | 268 | 215 | 210 | 191 | 269 | 1348 |
| | Azidi Ameran | 193 | 243 | 169 | | | | 605 |
| 6 | Qatar (QAT) | 997 | 1079 | 1043 | 1119 | 1086 | 950 | 6274 |
| | Bandar Al-Shafi | 214 | 258 | 169 | 236 | 198 | 222 | 1297 |
| | Mubarak Al-Merikhi | 170 | 200 | 162 | 191 | 299 | 178 | 1200 |
| | Ahmed Shahin Al-Merikhi | 176 | 215 | 223 | 268 | 180 | 173 | 1235 |
| | Abdulla Al-Qattan | 244 | 216 | 232 | 228 | 182 | 139 | 1241 |
| | Saeed Al-Hajri | 193 | 190 | 257 | 196 | 227 | 238 | 1301 |
| 7 | United Arab Emirates (UAE) | 1021 | 1001 | 1032 | 1015 | 1067 | 1097 | 6233 |
| | Sayed Ibrahim Al-Hashemi | 166 | 184 | 182 | 227 | 220 | 246 | 1225 |
| | Hussain Nasir Al-Suwaidi | | | | 195 | 188 | 197 | 580 |
| | Nayef Eqab | 238 | 192 | 228 | 195 | 254 | 247 | 1354 |
| | Jamal Ali Mohammed | 195 | 159 | 235 | 218 | 203 | 237 | 1247 |
| | Mohammed Al-Qubaisi | 216 | 236 | 210 | 180 | 202 | 170 | 1214 |
| | Mahmood Al-Attar | 206 | 230 | 177 | | | | 613 |
| 8 | Philippines (PHI) | 955 | 1067 | 1092 | 1075 | 1041 | 960 | 6190 |
| | Markwin Tee | 168 | 252 | 249 | 206 | 192 | 177 | 1244 |
| | Christian Jan Suarez | 223 | 222 | 235 | 197 | 203 | 190 | 1270 |
| | Biboy Rivera | 215 | 207 | 203 | 209 | 237 | 179 | 1250 |
| | Chester King | 167 | 173 | 223 | 197 | 212 | 224 | 1196 |
| | Paeng Nepomuceno | 182 | 213 | 182 | 266 | 197 | 190 | 1230 |
| 9 | Indonesia (INA) | 1015 | 1061 | 999 | 1085 | 1059 | 961 | 6180 |
| | Ryan Leonard Lalisang | 208 | 206 | 216 | 201 | 278 | 207 | 1316 |
| | Dennis Ranova Pulunggono | 167 | 253 | 257 | 215 | 181 | 181 | 1254 |
| | Haqi Rumandung | 220 | 175 | 172 | 265 | 233 | 220 | 1285 |
| | Hengki Susanto | 200 | 204 | 167 | 203 | 214 | 159 | 1147 |
| | Rudy Goenawan | 220 | 223 | 187 | 201 | 153 | 194 | 1178 |
| 10 | Bahrain (BRN) | 932 | 1006 | 1055 | 1063 | 1002 | 1068 | 6126 |
| | Mohamed Ahmed Mustafa | 201 | 231 | 194 | 164 | 192 | 211 | 1193 |
| | Osama Khalfan | 146 | 213 | 264 | 215 | 172 | 241 | 1251 |
| | Hameed Taqi | 173 | 190 | 234 | 247 | 211 | 192 | 1247 |
| | Mohamed Al-Shawoosh | 217 | 168 | 174 | 233 | 208 | 189 | 1189 |
| | Yusuf Mohamed Falah | 195 | 204 | 189 | 204 | 219 | 235 | 1246 |
| 11 | Chinese Taipei (TPE) | 993 | 981 | 1061 | 986 | 966 | 1067 | 6054 |
| | Cheng Chao-sheng | 223 | 167 | 173 | 147 | 202 | 213 | 1125 |
| | Hsieh Yu-ping | 196 | 224 | 237 | 259 | 181 | 225 | 1322 |
| | Cheng Fang-yu | 182 | 173 | 214 | 207 | 188 | 235 | 1199 |
| | Wang Tien-fu | 197 | 204 | 212 | 191 | 205 | 180 | 1189 |
| | Kao Hai-yuan | 195 | 213 | 225 | 182 | 190 | 214 | 1219 |
| 12 | Macau (MAC) | 976 | 969 | 1065 | 927 | 1027 | 1058 | 6022 |
| | Kot Ka Kit | 210 | 202 | 219 | 163 | 216 | 182 | 1192 |
| | Van Ka Kei | 180 | 198 | 192 | 200 | 203 | 192 | 1165 |
| | Ng Cheng Chok | 179 | 191 | 252 | 183 | 194 | 248 | 1247 |
| | Sou Wai Chon | 224 | 206 | 185 | 190 | 224 | 225 | 1254 |
| | Choi Io Fai | 183 | 172 | 217 | 191 | 190 | 211 | 1164 |
| 13 | China (CHN) | 975 | 982 | 989 | 1021 | 994 | 1000 | 5961 |
| | Wang Bin | 176 | 224 | 202 | 226 | 258 | 206 | 1292 |
| | Zhang Ye | 198 | 182 | 189 | 222 | 182 | 227 | 1200 |
| | Wang Yingjun | 204 | 173 | 220 | 179 | 189 | 167 | 1132 |
| | Jia Ling | 193 | 184 | 169 | 177 | 181 | 172 | 1076 |
| | Wang Shizhen | 204 | 219 | 209 | 217 | 184 | 228 | 1261 |
| 14 | Hong Kong (HKG) | 959 | 889 | 918 | 991 | 1170 | 939 | 5866 |
| | Wu Siu Hong | 173 | 196 | 171 | 247 | 278 | 210 | 1275 |
| | Eric Tseng | 190 | 161 | 203 | 157 | 182 | 159 | 1052 |
| | Cyrus Cheung | 220 | 145 | 171 | 202 | 245 | 178 | 1161 |
| | Daniel Yiu | 190 | 184 | 184 | 187 | 203 | 181 | 1129 |
| | Wicky Yeung | 186 | 203 | 189 | 198 | 262 | 211 | 1249 |
| 15 | Kuwait (KUW) | 951 | 827 | 980 | 986 | 1003 | 974 | 5721 |
| | Fadhel Al-Mousawi | 236 | 207 | 238 | 223 | 168 | 202 | 1274 |
| | Basel Al-Anzi | 209 | 132 | 198 | 169 | 182 | 186 | 1076 |
| | Khaled Al-Debayyan | 157 | 193 | 146 | 221 | 266 | 207 | 1190 |
| | Rakan Al-Ameeri | | | | 193 | 165 | 187 | 545 |
| | Jasem Al-Saqer | 180 | 159 | 227 | 180 | 222 | 192 | 1160 |
| | Mohammad Al-Regeebah | 169 | 136 | 171 | | | | 476 |
| 16 | Kazakhstan (KAZ) | 949 | 876 | 1003 | 893 | 979 | 840 | 5540 |
| | German Roshonok | 210 | 167 | 195 | 147 | 154 | 156 | 1029 |
| | Oleg Minulin | 158 | 133 | 214 | 192 | 195 | 187 | 1079 |
| | Abdrakhman Abinayev | 209 | 225 | 212 | 172 | 218 | 179 | 1215 |
| | Yevgeniy Kuznetsov | 178 | 169 | 206 | 191 | 155 | 146 | 1045 |
| | Kairat Baibolatov | 194 | 182 | 176 | 191 | 257 | 172 | 1172 |
| 17 | India (IND) | 995 | 962 | 916 | 863 | 915 | 829 | 5480 |
| | Vijay Punjabi | 195 | 201 | 165 | 169 | 195 | 164 | 1089 |
| | Ajay Singh | 166 | 193 | 185 | 147 | 168 | 182 | 1041 |
| | Aswathanarayana Srinath | 202 | 182 | 213 | 164 | 191 | 176 | 1128 |
| | Dinesh Kumar | | | | 179 | 170 | 156 | 505 |
| | Girish Ashok Gaba | 233 | 187 | 184 | 204 | 191 | 151 | 1150 |
| | Sethu Madhavan | 199 | 199 | 169 | | | | 567 |
| 18 | Uzbekistan (UZB) | 847 | 901 | 939 | 846 | 789 | 957 | 5279 |
| | Khondamir Shaabdurakhmanov | 144 | 214 | 163 | 176 | 158 | 245 | 1100 |
| | Ravshan Abdusamadov | 182 | 169 | 233 | 150 | 114 | 169 | 1017 |
| | Bakhodir Arifov | 195 | 162 | 140 | 174 | 144 | 188 | 1003 |
| | Kudrat Khilyamov | 135 | 182 | 177 | 147 | 191 | 172 | 1004 |
| | Sergey Sapov | 191 | 174 | 226 | 199 | 182 | 183 | 1155 |
Individuals
| | Ahmed Al-Bastiki (BRN) | 186 | 167 | 147 | 205 | 177 | 164 | 1046 |
| | Mohammad Aizat (BRU) | 180 | 182 | 193 | 180 | 192 | 162 | 1089 |
| | Hj Yakob Hj Abu Bakar (BRU) | 193 | 138 | 171 | 175 | 202 | 236 | 1115 |
| | Md Shahwall Hj Mustafa (BRU) | 175 | 158 | 176 | 162 | 216 | 199 | 1086 |
| | Michael Tsang (HKG) | 206 | 173 | 198 | 176 | 210 | 196 | 1159 |
| | Edwin Lioe (INA) | 169 | 211 | 190 | 153 | 192 | 213 | 1128 |
| | Dinesh Kumar (IND) | 202 | 182 | 191 | | | | 575 |
| | Sethu Madhavan (IND) | | | | 172 | 169 | 162 | 503 |
| | Yoshinao Masatoki (JPN) | | | | 200 | 228 | 248 | 676 |
| | Tomoyuki Sasaki (JPN) | 205 | 185 | 197 | | | | 587 |
| | Makhmut Lazaridi (KAZ) | 171 | 209 | 188 | 225 | 147 | 164 | 1104 |
| | Byun Ho-jin (KOR) | 189 | 168 | 183 | | | | 540 |
| | Park Sang-pil (KOR) | | | | 163 | 207 | 223 | 593 |
| | Faisal Sugati (KSA) | 201 | 173 | 204 | 169 | 214 | 212 | 1173 |
| | Rakan Al-Ameeri (KUW) | 246 | 257 | 176 | | | | 679 |
| | Mohammad Al-Regeebah (KUW) | | | | 195 | 211 | 195 | 601 |
| | Lok Hei Ieong (MAC) | 0 | 0 | 0 | 0 | 0 | 0 | 0 |
| | Azidi Ameran (MAS) | | | | 259 | 161 | 214 | 634 |
| | Daniel Lim (MAS) | 219 | 234 | 205 | | | | 658 |
| | Tyrone Ongpauco (PHI) | 159 | 192 | 226 | 227 | 182 | 205 | 1191 |
| | Khalifa Al-Kubaisi (QAT) | 162 | 241 | 217 | 187 | 189 | 256 | 1252 |
| | Carl de Vries (SIN) | 181 | 185 | 192 | | | | 558 |
| | Lionel Lim (SIN) | | | | 199 | 235 | 174 | 608 |
| | Chinnapong Chansuk (THA) | 217 | 212 | 199 | 213 | 219 | 224 | 1284 |
| | Sithiphol Kunaksorn (THA) | 194 | 194 | 225 | 241 | 248 | 191 | 1293 |
| | Somjed Kusonphithak (THA) | 205 | 196 | 193 | 246 | 192 | 204 | 1236 |
| | Yannaphon Larpapharat (THA) | 234 | 203 | 267 | 213 | 237 | 211 | 1365 |
| | Chen Yung-chuan (TPE) | 196 | 179 | 172 | 158 | 192 | 215 | 1112 |
| | Mahmood Al-Attar (UAE) | | | | 226 | 216 | 279 | 721 |
| | Hussain Nasir Al-Suwaidi (UAE) | 217 | 178 | 185 | | | | 580 |
| | Shavkat Shakasimov (UZB) | 160 | 189 | 197 | 166 | 204 | 174 | 1090 |
