= Bowling at the 2014 Asian Games – Men's team =

Men's team of 5 at the 2014 Asian Games
- Venue: Anyang Hogye Gymnasium
- Date: 29–30 September 2014
- Competitors: 101 from 17 nations

Medalists
gold medal	South Korea; Park Jong-woo, Choi Bok-eum, Kim Kyung-min, Shin Seung-hyeon, Kang Hee-won, Hong Hae-sol
silver medal	Malaysia; Syafiq Ridhwan, Adrian Ang, Timmy Tan, Zulmazran Zulkifli, Alex Liew, Muhammad Rafiq Ismail
bronze medal	Hong Kong; Wicky Yeung, Kam Siu Lun, Eric Tseng, Wu Siu Hong, Michael Mak, Chan Yat Long

The men's team of five competition at the 2014 Asian Games in Incheon was held on 29 and 30 September 2014 at Anyang Hogye Gymnasium.

== Schedule ==
All times are Korea Standard Time (UTC+09:00)

Date	Time	Event
Monday, 29 September 2014	09:00	1st block
Tuesday, 30 September 2014	14:30	2nd block

== Results ==
Rank	Team	Game						Total
Rank	Team	1	2	3	4	5	6	Total
1st place, gold medalist(s)	South Korea (KOR)	1069	1035	1052	1058	1027	987	6228
	Park Jong-woo	241	223	202	228	233	180	1307
	Choi Bok-eum	194	203	203	228	167	196	1191
	Kim Kyung-min	254	171	212	212	161	217	1227
	Shin Seung-hyeon	192	206	229	195	255	196	1273
	Kang Hee-won	188	232	206				626
	Hong Hae-sol				195	211	198	604
2nd place, silver medalist(s)	Malaysia (MAS)	977	911	1050	978	1060	1010	5986
	Syafiq Ridhwan	214	214	182	173	213	174	1170
	Adrian Ang	190	165	221	248	185	258	1267
	Timmy Tan	216	137	208	181	214	199	1155
	Zulmazran Zulkifli	209	199	253	188	258	178	1285
	Alex Liew	148	196	186				530
	Muhammad Rafiq Ismail				188	190	201	579
3rd place, bronze medalist(s)	Hong Kong (HKG)	999	1035	1021	1002	926	917	5900
	Wicky Yeung	212	186	244	181	202	149	1174
	Kam Siu Lun	179	258	189	199	201	153	1179
	Eric Tseng	192	200	195	170	170	222	1149
	Wu Siu Hong	215	200	181	205	144	172	1117
	Michael Mak	201	191	212	247	209	221	1281
4	China (CHN)	1023	901	1044	1023	951	954	5896
	Mi Zhongli	202	213	191	192	199	188	1185
	Wang Shizhen	236	159	237	206	191	190	1219
	Qi Wankang	192	144	179	197	157	179	1048
	Wang Zhiyong	187	179	222	200	191	180	1159
	Du Jianchao	206	206	215	228	213	217	1285
4	United Arab Emirates (UAE)	1061	1024	944	912	940	1015	5896
	Hussain Nasir Al-Suwaidi	211	247	177	191	164	240	1230
	Hareb Al-Mansoori	226	168	198	161	170	173	1096
	Mahmood Al-Attar	191	172	199	149	202	184	1097
	Nayef Eqab	212	225	191	230	180	198	1236
	Shaker Ali Al-Hassan	221	212	179	181	224	220	1237
6	Indonesia (INA)	1001	1063	1013	931	903	926	5837
	Ryan Leonard Lalisang	191	223	218	169	197	210	1208
	Billy Muhammad Islam	216	276	216	178	185	193	1264
	Diwan Rezaldy	231	160	165	173	166	188	1083
	Yeri Ramadona	168	204	210	198	191	189	1160
	Hardy Rachmadian	195	200	204	213	164	146	1122
7	Thailand (THA)	1139	894	989	951	884	973	5830
	Annop Arromsaranon	191	180	172	197	160	169	1069
	Panuruj Vilailak	199	169	178	162	204	177	1089
	Atittarat Cheng	237	168	211	191	154	221	1182
	Sithiphol Kunaksorn	244	190	181	221	190	212	1238
	Yannaphon Larpapharat	268	187	247	180	176	194	1252
8	Philippines (PHI)	978	1024	967	907	883	1068	5827
	Biboy Rivera	179	226	178	193	193	179	1148
	Frederick Ong	190	193	170	158	186	170	1067
	Kenneth Chua	213	210	214	169	177	240	1223
	Jomar Jumapao	189	213	222	153	167	266	1210
	Enrico Hernandez	207	182	183	234	160	213	1179
9	Singapore (SIN)	1016	968	921	943	1013	923	5784
	Joel Tan	223	236	174	182	192	197	1204
	Ng Chiew Pang	215	185	198	167	180	172	1117
	Keith Saw	195	173	187	237	204	166	1162
	Justin Lim	205	205	195	210	254	197	1266
	Jaris Goh	178	169	167				514
	Javier Tan				147	183	191	521
10	Japan (JPN)	898	1024	973	951	982	941	5769
	Tomoyuki Sasaki	193	142	204	217	225	199	1180
	Shogo Wada	158	201	177	193	193	150	1072
	Toshihiko Takahashi	183	255	168	177	217	211	1211
	Yoshinao Masatoki	197	222	222	184	186	168	1179
	Shusaku Asato	167	204	202				573
	Daisuke Yoshida				180	161	213	554
11	Uzbekistan (UZB)	961	928	1005	864	846	910	5514
	Bakhtiyor Dalabaev	235	170	174	186	161	197	1123
	Sergey Sapov	156	220	223	170	174	181	1124
	Fayzulla Nasirov	159	187	235	182	190	176	1129
	Viktor Smirnov	203	209	162	146	173	150	1043
	Bakhodir Arifov	208	142	211	180	148	206	1095
12	Qatar (QAT)	939	895	925	855	851	967	5432
	Yousef Al-Jaber	196	216	178	154	168	186	1098
	Jassim Al-Merikhi	183	193	218	177	168	202	1141
	Ahmed Al-Deyab	174	166	179	177	134	188	1018
	Jassem Al-Deyab	191	126	151	163	149	195	975
	Mubarak Al-Merikhi	195	194	199	184	232	196	1200
13	Macau (MAC)	951	911	933	874	871	886	5426
	Zoe Dias Ma	181	156	192	181	134	145	989
	Tam Tsz Sun	221	209	160	149	197	251	1187
	Lee Tak Man	186	154	226	197	175	183	1121
	Choi Io Fai	158	224	221	170	181	161	1115
	Chan Kam Seng	205	168	134				507
	Man Si Kei				177	184	146	507
14	Saudi Arabia (KSA)	977	887	819	898	879	961	5421
	Adel Al-Bariqi	172	149	169	232	218	202	1142
	Mohammed Al-Saud	177	182	158	152	171	182	1022
	Yasser Abulreesh	220	185	150	193	184	155	1087
	Abdullah Al-Dolijan	219	213	169	164	135	192	1092
	Talal Al-Towireb				157	171	230	558
	Bader Al-Shaikh	189	158	173				520
15	Kuwait (KUW)	922	834	943	837	930	936	5402
	Abdullah Ahmad	193	167	174	162	154	192	1042
	Basel Al-Anzi	189	156	207	152	181	187	1072
	Jasem Al-Saqer	178	197	179	151	213	194	1112
	Rakan Al-Ameeri	158	179	214	176	216	191	1134
	Yaqoub Al-Shatti	204	135	169				508
	Mostafa Al-Mousawi				196	166	172	534
16	Vietnam (VIE)	837	916	862	944	920	886	5365
	Lê Anh Tuấn	141	200	119	182	187	174	1003
	Đào Xuân Phúc	154	185	206	211	176	155	1087
	Lê Hồng Minh	145	151	182	179	150	160	967
	Phạm Quốc Bảo Kỳ	224	172	150	196	206	168	1116
	Nguyễn Thành Phố	173	208	205	176	201	229	1192
17	Mongolia (MGL)	803	802	819	782	854	781	4841
	Dondovyn Zorigt	194	178	186	157	183	188	1086
	Tseveen-Ochiryn Batjargal	146	173	176	157	176	149	977
	Jamtsyn Sodnomdorj	171	192	145	151	156	157	972
	Bayaraagiin Batmönkh	131	119	158	151	181	122	862
	Miyesengyn Tüvshinsanaa	161	140	154	166	158	165	944
Individuals
	Yang Wei (CHN)	193	200	235	187	181	159	1155
	Chan Yat Long (HKG)	173	178	149	161	180	222	1063
	Adhiguna Widiantoro (INA)	179	201	149	160	172	233	1094
	Shusaku Asato (JPN)				180	202	212	594
	Daisuke Yoshida (JPN)	200	149	194				543
	Hong Hae-sol (KOR)	196	205	236				637
	Kang Hee-won (KOR)				226	222	245	693
	Bader Al-Shaikh (KSA)				0	0	0	0
	Talal Al-Towireb (KSA)	165	197	179				541
	Mostafa Al-Mousawi (KUW)	191	200	206				597
	Yaqoub Al-Shatti (KUW)				209	144	168	521
	Chan Kam Seng (MAC)				159	190	176	525
	Man Si Kei (MAC)	159	162	172				493
	Muhammad Rafiq Ismail (MAS)	211	203	216				630
	Alex Liew (MAS)				191	285	195	671
	Ganboldyn Altangerel (MGL)	149	129	157	128	157	121	841
	Benshir Layoso (PHI)	192	155	204	205	196	234	1186
	Khalid Al-Dosari (QAT)	200	170	134	210	138	204	1056
	Jaris Goh (SIN)				160	157	203	520
	Javier Tan (SIN)	220	168	190				578
	Mohamed Al-Marzooqi (UAE)	211	205	121	181	177	206	1101
	Kudrat Khilyamov (UZB)	169	141	148	184	155	167	964
	Phạm Gia Phú (VIE)	0	0	0	0	0	0	0
	Ihab Al-Hashimi (YEM)	180	190	159	148	172	143	992
	Saeed Al-Hushail (YEM)	0	0	0	0	0	0	0
