= Bowling at the 2006 Asian Games – Men's trios =

Men's trios at the 2006 Asian Games
- Venue: Qatar Bowling Center
- Date: 5–6 December 2006
- Competitors: 111 from 20 nations

Medalists
gold medal	Malaysia; Daniel Lim, Ben Heng, Aaron Kong
silver medal	Singapore; Lee Yu Wen, Jason Yeong-Nathan, Remy Ong
bronze medal	Saudi Arabia; Bader Al-Shaikh, Faisal Al-Juraifani, Hassan Al-Shaikh

The men's trios competition at the 2006 Asian Games in Doha was held on 5 and 6 December 2006 at Qatar Bowling Centre.

== Schedule ==
All times are Arabia Standard Time (UTC+03:00)

Date	Time	Event
Tuesday, 5 December 2006	09:00	First block squad A
Tuesday, 5 December 2006	13:00	First block squad B
Wednesday, 6 December 2006	13:00	Second block squad A
Wednesday, 6 December 2006	17:00	Second block squad B

== Results ==
Rank	Team	Game						Total
Rank	Team	1	2	3	4	5	6	Total
1st place, gold medalist(s)	Malaysia 2 (MAS)	665	704	629	695	710	686	4089
	Daniel Lim	210	234	161	231	278	209	1323
	Ben Heng	198	237	268	233	206	232	1374
	Aaron Kong	257	233	200	231	226	245	1392
2nd place, silver medalist(s)	Singapore 2 (SIN)	620	700	621	643	686	715	3985
	Lee Yu Wen	225	258	182	226	219	199	1309
	Jason Yeong-Nathan	214	218	230	164	240	257	1323
	Remy Ong	181	224	209	253	227	259	1353
3rd place, bronze medalist(s)	Saudi Arabia 2 (KSA)	628	592	647	679	604	721	3871
	Hassan Al-Shaikh	193	184	211	256	229	236	1309
	Faisal Al-Juraifani	212	211	188	189	184	196	1180
	Bader Al-Shaikh	223	197	248	234	191	289	1382
4	Malaysia 1 (MAS)	568	622	640	730	681	611	3852
	Azidi Ameran	184	204	230	225	231	192	1266
	Zulmazran Zulkifli	196	183	184	268	235	205	1271
	Alex Liew	188	235	226	237	215	214	1315
5	Japan 2 (JPN)	543	619	640	721	593	734	3850
	Tomoyuki Sasaki	167	204	194	197	184	254	1200
	Tomokatsu Yamashita	184	233	191	289	206	233	1336
	Masaru Ito	192	182	255	235	203	247	1314
6	Philippines 1 (PHI)	597	657	568	686	656	655	3819
	Christian Jan Suarez	179	188	191	210	223	220	1211
	Markwin Tee	204	234	179	241	208	248	1314
	Biboy Rivera	214	235	198	235	225	187	1294
7	Qatar 1 (QAT)	604	570	615	667	732	615	3803
	Abdulla Al-Qattan	214	211	185	187	232	231	1260
	Ahmed Shahin Al-Merikhi	195	163	248	257	256	201	1320
	Saeed Al-Hajri	195	196	182	223	244	183	1223
8	Singapore 1 (SIN)	586	625	544	730	664	653	3802
	Lionel Lim	191	213	162	236	204	229	1235
	Carl de Vries	200	223	219	258	246	198	1344
	Shaun Ng	195	189	163	236	214	226	1223
9	South Korea 2 (KOR)	683	623	640	667	552	631	3796
	Joung Seoung-joo	193	184	257	213	222	177	1246
	Park Sang-pil	222	213	146	201	152	210	1144
	Jo Nam-yi	268	226	237	253	178	244	1406
10	Thailand 1 (THA)	627	548	612	652	629	726	3794
	Sithiphol Kunaksorn	198	141	192	197	210	223	1161
	Somjed Kusonphithak	203	206	206	232	195	257	1299
	Yannaphon Larpapharat	226	201	214	223	224	246	1334
11	Japan 1 (JPN)	613	692	676	560	647	604	3792
	Toshihiko Takahashi	189	235	235	207	203	211	1280
	Yoshinao Masatoki	226	200	245	183	196	223	1273
	Masaaki Takemoto	198	257	196	170	248	170	1239
12	Chinese Taipei 2 (TPE)	575	680	661	675	591	605	3787
	Cheng Chao-sheng	181	212	238	235	200	164	1230
	Hsieh Yu-ping	183	223	212	237	197	231	1283
	Wang Tien-fu	211	245	211	203	194	210	1274
13	Qatar 2 (QAT)	582	642	579	632	699	621	3755
	Bandar Al-Shafi	218	213	202	237	183	212	1265
	Khalifa Al-Kubaisi	173	230	214	163	250	162	1192
	Mubarak Al-Merikhi	191	199	163	232	266	247	1298
14	Philippines 2 (PHI)	654	641	694	635	528	582	3734
	Paeng Nepomuceno	246	196	298	203	180	213	1336
	Tyrone Ongpauco	193	227	185	201	184	179	1169
	Chester King	215	218	211	231	164	190	1229
15	Bahrain 1 (BRN)	540	588	627	634	719	602	3710
	Hameed Taqi	192	203	195	226	248	195	1259
	Ahmed Al-Bastiki	172	173	164	204	223	143	1079
	Osama Khalfan	176	212	268	204	248	264	1372
16	Chinese Taipei 1 (TPE)	571	583	661	615	645	634	3709
	Chen Yung-chuan	178	190	189	200	206	206	1169
	Cheng Fang-yu	190	177	235	233	244	235	1314
	Kao Hai-yuan	203	216	237	182	195	193	1226
17	Hong Kong 2 (HKG)	627	592	557	637	701	587	3701
	Wicky Yeung	219	189	190	193	255	181	1227
	Daniel Yiu	206	192	172	231	212	159	1172
	Wu Siu Hong	202	211	195	213	234	247	1302
17	United Arab Emirates 1 (UAE)	528	626	576	614	647	710	3701
	Sayed Ibrahim Al-Hashemi	171	199	213	216	205	207	1211
	Jamal Ali Mohammed	181	214	197	205	215	245	1257
	Hussain Nasir Al-Suwaidi	176	213	166	193	227	258	1233
19	Bahrain 2 (BRN)	616	573	610	636	651	608	3694
	Mohamed Ahmed Mustafa	204	159	226	191	195	200	1175
	Mohamed Al-Shawoosh	199	200	191	236	242	215	1283
	Yusuf Mohamed Falah	213	214	193	209	214	193	1236
20	United Arab Emirates 2 (UAE)	547	578	653	539	652	712	3681
	Mahmood Al-Attar	187	179	235	108	233	234	1176
	Nayef Eqab	201	216	246	230	214	255	1362
	Mohammed Al-Qubaisi	159	183	172	201	205	223	1143
21	Indonesia 2 (INA)	619	592	620	629	579	637	3676
	Edwin Lioe	157	212	212	194	176	202	1153
	Haqi Rumandung	214	188	199	256	213	179	1249
	Rudy Goenawan	248	192	209	179	190	256	1274
22	South Korea 1 (KOR)	558	620	641	615	593	646	3673
	Kang Hee-won	160	186	256	190	211	185	1188
	Byun Ho-jin	215	205	169	206	209	202	1206
	Choi Bok-eum	183	229	216	219	173	259	1279
23	Indonesia 1 (INA)	602	601	544	627	682	591	3647
	Dennis Ranova Pulunggono	184	225	170	200	264	177	1220
	Hengki Susanto	236	196	184	203	225	180	1224
	Ryan Leonard Lalisang	182	180	190	224	193	234	1203
24	Macau 2 (MAC)	579	567	665	583	594	617	3605
	Choi Io Fai	180	208	213	202	204	211	1218
	Van Ka Kei	199	166	226	225	200	213	1229
	Sou Wai Chon	200	193	226	156	190	193	1158
25	Saudi Arabia 1 (KSA)	567	624	505	644	622	620	3582
	Ahmed Al-Hdyan	211	216	181	247	231	235	1321
	Faisal Sugati	177	200	153	182	197	138	1047
	Yousif Akbar	179	208	171	215	194	247	1214
26	Kuwait 1 (KUW)	632	522	611	644	598	558	3565
	Khaled Al-Debayyan	210	157	205	252	206	190	1220
	Basel Al-Anzi	192	183	191	194	203	200	1163
	Fadhel Al-Mousawi	230	182	215	198	189	168	1182
27	China 1 (CHN)	552	592	539	593	613	639	3528
	Jia Ling	171	221	179	200	218	180	1169
	Wang Bin	184	170	181	205	184	213	1137
	Zhang Ye	197	201	179	188	211	246	1222
28	Hong Kong 1 (HKG)	614	542	575	573	585	636	3525
	Eric Tseng	206	163	204	193	192	217	1175
	Michael Tsang	185	176	184	183	194	220	1142
	Cyrus Cheung	223	203	187	197	199	199	1208
29	Kuwait 2 (KUW)	601	492	557	606	640	618	3514
	Jasem Al-Saqer	200	132	223	201	191	192	1139
	Rakan Al-Ameeri	178	198	160	202	214	201	1153
	Mohammad Al-Regeebah	223	162	174	203	235	225	1222
30	India 1 (IND)	611	497	562	632	635	532	3469
	Vijay Punjabi	221	157	212	266	195	186	1237
	Aswathanarayana Srinath	224	148	161	207	193	179	1112
	Girish Ashok Gaba	166	192	189	159	247	167	1120
31	India 2 (IND)	592	559	503	569	578	533	3334
	Dinesh Kumar	182	193	174	172	207	167	1095
	Ajay Singh	184	188	157	218	203	183	1133
	Sethu Madhavan	226	178	172	179	168	183	1106
32	Macau 1 (MAC)	644	545	532	524	524	538	3307
	Lok Hei Ieong	227	174	152	159	139	183	1034
	Kot Ka Kit	232	161	202	194	225	167	1181
	Ng Cheng Chok	185	210	178	171	160	188	1092
33	Uzbekistan 1 (UZB)	595	498	524	499	554	600	3270
	Khondamir Shaabdurakhmanov	210	137	163	184	183	194	1071
	Kudrat Khilyamov	171	176	158	149	169	203	1026
	Sergey Sapov	214	185	203	166	202	203	1173
34	Kazakhstan 1 (KAZ)	564	521	477	561	567	519	3209
	German Roshonok	210	198	177	203	134	138	1060
	Yevgeniy Kuznetsov	204	157	165	148	166	144	984
	Makhmut Lazaridi	150	166	135	210	267	237	1165
35	Uzbekistan 2 (UZB)	573	548	559	464	502	540	3186
	Bakhodir Arifov	212	176	209	167	149	167	1080
	Ravshan Abdusamadov	183	188	194	132	185	199	1081
	Shavkat Shakasimov	178	184	156	165	168	174	1025
36	Brunei 1 (BRU)	521	538	540	554	479	547	3179
	Mohammad Aizat	181	157	161	173	135	188	995
	Hj Yakob Hj Abu Bakar	163	196	180	181	175	192	1087
	Md Shahwall Hj Mustafa	177	185	199	200	169	167	1097
37	Kazakhstan 2 (KAZ)	531	480	506	503	475	595	3090
	Abdrakhman Abinayev	167	183	198	159	151	248	1106
	Oleg Minulin	143	129	135	140	142	188	877
	Kairat Baibolatov	221	168	173	204	182	159	1107
Individuals
	Wang Shizhen (CHN)	173	278	216	217	206	194	1284
	Wang Yingjun (CHN)	170	209	193	167	181	200	1120
	Chinnapong Chansuk (THA)	211	214	192	235	259	235	1346
