= Bowling at the 2014 Asian Games – Men's masters =

Men's masters at the 2014 Asian Games
- Venue: Anyang Hogye Gymnasium
- Date: 1–2 October 2014
- Competitors: 16 from 9 nations

Medalists
gold medal	Park Jong-woo	South Korea
silver medal	Wu Siu Hong	Hong Kong
bronze medal	Shaker Ali Al-Hassan	United Arab Emirates

The men's masters competition at the 2014 Asian Games in Incheon was held on 1 and 2 October 2014 at Anyang Hogye Gymnasium.

The Masters event comprises the top 16 bowlers (maximum two per country) from the all-events competition.

== Schedule ==
All times are Korea Standard Time (UTC+09:00)

Date	Time	Event
Wednesday, 1 October 2014	09:00	1st block
Thursday, 2 October 2014	12:00	2nd block
Thursday, 2 October 2014	17:30	Stepladder final round 1
Thursday, 2 October 2014	17:30	Stepladder final round 2

== Results ==
=== Preliminary ===
Rank	Athlete	Game																Total
Rank	Athlete	1	2	3	4	5	6	7	8	9	10	11	12	13	14	15	16	Total
1	Park Jong-woo (KOR)	226; 10	192; 10	226; 10	227; 10	211; 10	182; 0	170; 0	218; 0	247; 10	226; 10	211; 10	221; 0	214; 10	226; 10	182; 10	202; 0	3491
2	Wu Siu Hong (HKG)	193; 0	221; 10	211; 10	246; 0	211; 5	181; 10	234; 10	212; 10	183; 0	225; 10	204; 0	214; 10	199; 0	226; 10	200; 0	210; 10	3465
3	Shaker Ali Al-Hassan (UAE)	257; 10	214; 10	192; 0	212; 10	211; 5	238; 10	163; 0	183; 0	224; 10	214; 0	226; 10	204; 10	192; 10	216; 10	157; 0	202; 10	3410
4	Du Jianchao (CHN)	228; 10	217; 10	196; 0	182; 10	213; 10	209; 0	203; 10	217; 10	172; 0	187; 0	214; 10	203; 0	191; 10	215; 10	216; 10	228; 10	3401
5	Michael Mak (HKG)	227; 10	180; 0	235; 10	156; 0	245; 10	245; 10	178; 0	177; 0	256; 10	237; 10	198; 0	183; 0	154; 0	200; 10	208; 10	211; 10	3380
6	Hussain Nasir Al-Suwaidi (UAE)	209; 0	200; 0	222; 10	212; 0	220; 0	258; 10	187; 0	216; 10	195; 0	222; 10	190; 0	234; 10	193; 0	183; 0	174; 10	201; 0	3376
7	Yannaphon Larpapharat (THA)	206; 0	215; 0	190; 10	181; 0	243; 10	165; 0	223; 10	203; 0	247; 10	194; 0	255; 10	195; 0	222; 10	210; 0	159; 0	194; 0	3362
8	Zulmazran Zulkifli (MAS)	234; 10	159; 10	185; 0	201; 10	200; 0	221; 0	179; 0	225; 10	236; 0	196; 0	202; 10	224; 0	233; 10	214; 0	186; 0	195; 0	3350
8	Ryan Leonard Lalisang (INA)	161; 0	228; 10	244; 10	194; 0	216; 0	185; 0	211; 10	203; 10	187; 0	232; 10	225; 10	205; 10	199; 10	201; 10	181; 0	188; 0	3350
10	Yoshinao Masatoki (JPN)	227; 10	216; 10	200; 10	232; 10	198; 0	179; 0	165; 0	248; 10	148; 0	178; 0	215; 0	236; 10	187; 0	180; 10	211; 10	208; 10	3318
11	Billy Muhammad Islam (INA)	253; 10	151; 0	185; 0	187; 10	208; 0	192; 10	256; 10	199; 10	203; 10	149; 0	163; 0	190; 0	227; 10	205; 0	214; 10	212; 10	3284
12	Adrian Ang (MAS)	199; 0	196; 0	219; 0	174; 0	178; 0	185; 10	176; 0	174; 0	225; 0	236; 10	226; 10	175; 0	190; 0	231; 10	212; 10	212; 10	3268
13	Toshihiko Takahashi (JPN)	162; 0	184; 0	162; 0	193; 0	167; 10	177; 0	239; 10	213; 10	248; 10	189; 0	249; 10	237; 10	191; 0	192; 0	181; 10	210; 0	3264
14	Kang Hee-won (KOR)	224; 0	218; 10	184; 0	180; 10	216; 10	245; 10	213; 10	183; 0	212; 10	212; 10	211; 0	164; 0	185; 0	159; 0	199; 0	183; 0	3258
15	Sithiphol Kunaksorn (THA)	223; 10	184; 0	190; 10	172; 0	185; 10	203; 10	210; 0	175; 0	189; 10	226; 10	166; 0	224; 10	212; 10	168; 0	173; 0	238; 10	3228
16	Justin Lim (SIN)	209; 0	185; 0	204; 0	279; 10	160; 0	173; 0	172; 10	178; 0	171; 0	198; 0	180; 0	183; 10	211; 0	190; 0	147; 0	170; 0	3040

=== Stepladder finals ===
Stepladder final round 1			Stepladder final round 2
			1	Park Jong-woo (KOR)	225	182	407
2	Wu Siu Hong (HKG)	183^{35}	2	Wu Siu Hong (HKG)	187	214	401
3	Shaker Ali Al-Hassan (UAE)	183^{27}
