= Bowling at the 2006 Asian Games – Men's doubles =

Men's doubles at the 2006 Asian Games
- Venue: Qatar Bowling Center
- Date: 4 December 2006
- Competitors: 112 from 20 nations

Medalists
gold medal	Hassan Al-Shaikh; Bader Al-Shaikh	Saudi Arabia
silver medal	Abdulla Al-Qattan; Saeed Al-Hajri	Qatar
silver medal	Jamal Ali Mohammed; Nayef Eqab	United Arab Emirates

The men's doubles competition at the 2006 Asian Games in Doha was held on 4 December 2006 at the Qatar Bowling Centre.

== Schedule ==
All times are Arabia Standard Time (UTC+03:00)

Date	Time	Event
Monday, 4 December 2006	09:00	Squad A
Monday, 4 December 2006	13:00	Squad B

== Results ==
Rank	Team	Game						Total
Rank	Team	1	2	3	4	5	6	Total
1st place, gold medalist(s)	Saudi Arabia 3 (KSA)	435	444	479	458	526	479	2821
	Hassan Al-Shaikh	223	248	234	201	279	244	1429
	Bader Al-Shaikh	212	196	245	257	247	235	1392
2nd place, silver medalist(s)	Qatar 1 (QAT)	358	480	480	495	483	486	2782
	Abdulla Al-Qattan	180	233	266	255	256	220	1410
	Saeed Al-Hajri	178	247	214	240	227	266	1372
2nd place, silver medalist(s)	United Arab Emirates 1 (UAE)	452	418	439	438	498	537	2782
	Jamal Ali Mohammed	237	194	224	200	244	237	1336
	Nayef Eqab	215	224	215	238	254	300	1446
4	Thailand 2 (THA)	502	446	427	499	422	472	2768
	Somjed Kusonphithak	266	260	227	276	219	245	1493
	Yannaphon Larpapharat	236	186	200	223	203	227	1275
5	Philippines 1 (PHI)	409	447	451	487	425	523	2742
	Tyrone Ongpauco	204	189	204	242	201	234	1274
	Markwin Tee	205	258	247	245	224	289	1468
6	Singapore 3 (SIN)	469	493	427	425	448	472	2734
	Lee Yu Wen	223	244	215	222	266	248	1418
	Remy Ong	246	249	212	203	182	224	1316
7	Singapore 2 (SIN)	478	421	470	470	420	458	2717
	Jason Yeong-Nathan	242	215	233	246	216	204	1356
	Shaun Ng	236	206	237	224	204	254	1361
8	Qatar 2 (QAT)	359	499	481	450	442	463	2694
	Ahmed Shahin Al-Merikhi	181	244	223	225	223	237	1333
	Khalifa Al-Kubaisi	178	255	258	225	219	226	1361
9	Singapore 1 (SIN)	482	441	483	384	404	499	2693
	Carl de Vries	235	259	236	202	182	264	1378
	Lionel Lim	247	182	247	182	222	235	1315
10	United Arab Emirates 3 (UAE)	483	433	481	401	442	439	2679
	Sayed Ibrahim Al-Hashemi	227	213	224	198	207	211	1280
	Mohammed Al-Qubaisi	256	220	257	203	235	228	1399
11	Malaysia 2 (MAS)	459	411	426	482	453	447	2678
	Azidi Ameran	259	193	222	237	226	234	1371
	Aaron Kong	200	218	204	245	227	213	1307
11	Malaysia 1 (MAS)	419	522	379	462	438	458	2678
	Alex Liew	216	256	205	235	225	255	1392
	Ben Heng	203	266	174	227	213	203	1286
13	South Korea 1 (KOR)	455	493	424	427	384	489	2672
	Park Sang-pil	245	258	198	226	181	221	1329
	Byun Ho-jin	210	235	226	201	203	268	1343
14	Saudi Arabia 2 (KSA)	427	507	441	425	415	439	2649
	Faisal Al-Juraifani	236	258	246	213	213	211	1377
	Yousif Akbar	191	249	195	212	202	228	1277
15	Qatar 3 (QAT)	462	499	459	409	382	437	2648
	Bandar Al-Shafi	225	298	246	214	168	235	1386
	Mubarak Al-Merikhi	237	201	213	195	214	202	1262
16	Malaysia 3 (MAS)	408	451	454	368	452	486	2619
	Daniel Lim	201	234	257	174	221	268	1355
	Zulmazran Zulkifli	207	217	197	194	231	218	1264
17	South Korea 3 (KOR)	431	416	441	400	479	423	2590
	Joung Seoung-joo	247	225	215	205	243	212	1347
	Jo Nam-yi	184	191	226	195	236	211	1243
18	Hong Kong 2 (HKG)	458	493	433	369	397	436	2586
	Michael Tsang	213	216	212	179	170	189	1179
	Daniel Yiu	245	277	221	190	227	247	1407
19	Japan 3 (JPN)	462	398	384	440	474	426	2584
	Tomokatsu Yamashita	239	183	173	234	222	226	1277
	Masaaki Takemoto	223	215	211	206	252	200	1307
20	United Arab Emirates 2 (UAE)	385	439	471	482	385	411	2573
	Hussain Nasir Al-Suwaidi	211	233	259	257	201	217	1378
	Mahmood Al-Attar	174	206	212	225	184	194	1195
21	Hong Kong 3 (HKG)	414	430	446	454	393	409	2546
	Wicky Yeung	204	216	181	206	214	164	1185
	Wu Siu Hong	210	214	265	248	179	245	1361
22	China 2 (CHN)	449	470	401	448	411	358	2537
	Jia Ling	225	213	236	245	205	132	1256
	Zhang Ye	224	257	165	203	206	226	1281
23	Philippines 2 (PHI)	447	448	440	424	460	312	2531
	Chester King	211	221	247	197	235	164	1275
	Biboy Rivera	236	227	193	227	225	148	1256
24	South Korea 2 (KOR)	427	404	432	427	408	432	2530
	Choi Bok-eum	183	174	184	178	196	257	1172
	Kang Hee-won	244	230	248	249	212	175	1358
25	Japan 2 (JPN)	403	455	393	430	462	376	519
	Masaru Ito	200	177	180	227	195	172	1151
	Toshihiko Takahashi	203	278	213	203	267	204	1368
26	Philippines 3 (PHI)	436	443	414	365	480	380	2518
	Christian Jan Suarez	223	249	211	190	237	185	1295
	Paeng Nepomuceno	213	194	203	175	243	195	1223
27	Japan 1 (JPN)	377	321	431	444	461	482	2516
	Tomoyuki Sasaki	190	145	229	233	245	243	1285
	Yoshinao Masatoki	187	176	202	211	216	239	1231
28	Kuwait 1 (KUW)	448	436	454	385	393	395	2511
	Jasem Al-Saqer	202	223	208	205	207	150	1195
	Basel Al-Anzi	246	213	246	180	186	245	1316
29	Chinese Taipei 3 (TPE)	414	426	421	471	419	347	2498
	Hsieh Yu-ping	203	215	204	225	238	156	1241
	Wang Tien-fu	211	211	217	246	181	191	1257
30	Bahrain 1 (BRN)	400	413	471	419	410	382	2495
	Mohamed Al-Shawoosh	205	203	235	208	189	189	1229
	Yusuf Mohamed Falah	195	210	236	211	221	193	1266
31	Indonesia 3 (INA)	383	430	460	434	375	403	2485
	Ryan Leonard Lalisang	223	247	216	235	193	214	1328
	Rudy Goenawan	160	183	244	199	182	189	1157
32	Kuwait 3 (KUW)	462	402	407	415	407	387	2480
	Fadhel Al-Mousawi	228	183	204	181	216	217	1229
	Mohammad Al-Regeebah	234	219	203	234	191	170	1251
33	Kuwait 2 (KUW)	397	390	431	429	431	386	2464
	Rakan Al-Ameeri	161	155	183	226	204	197	1126
	Khaled Al-Debayyan	236	235	248	203	227	189	1338
34	Hong Kong 1 (HKG)	457	393	427	451	291	443	2462
	Eric Tseng	232	166	222	193	151	206	1170
	Cyrus Cheung	225	227	205	258	140	237	1292
35	Bahrain 2 (BRN)	401	416	373	415	471	371	2447
	Hameed Taqi	170	211	171	217	237	176	1182
	Mohamed Ahmed Mustafa	231	205	202	198	234	195	1265
36	Bahrain 3 (BRN)	415	419	452	335	470	355	2446
	Ahmed Al-Bastiki	216	184	239	169	193	184	1185
	Osama Khalfan	199	235	213	166	277	171	1261
37	China 1 (CHN)	400	407	401	418	376	439	2441
	Wang Bin	186	182	185	227	174	222	1176
	Wang Shizhen	214	225	216	191	202	217	1265
38	Thailand 1 (THA)	387	409	407	390	367	479	2439
	Chinnapong Chansuk	189	232	172	208	200	256	1257
	Sithiphol Kunaksorn	198	177	235	182	167	223	1182
39	Chinese Taipei 2 (TPE)	360	372	449	417	389	449	2436
	Cheng Fang-yu	191	203	259	216	167	265	1301
	Chen Yung-chuan	169	169	190	201	222	184	1135
40	Macau 2 (MAC)	458	450	306	414	385	412	2425
	Choi Io Fai	214	225	174	178	206	197	1194
	Sou Wai Chon	244	225	132	236	179	215	1231
41	Chinese Taipei (TPE)	404	397	444	396	394	384	2419
	Cheng Chao-sheng	212	204	232	191	168	233	1240
	Kao Hai-yuan	192	193	212	205	226	151	1179
42	Macau 1 (MAC)	396	385	441	451	347	355	2375
	Lok Hei Ieong	227	203	215	245	156	182	1228
	Ng Cheng Chok	169	182	226	206	191	173	1147
43	Saudi Arabia 1 (KSA)	389	367	396	369	361	450	2332
	Faisal Sugati	228	168	177	183	147	224	1127
	Ahmed Al-Hdyan	161	199	219	186	214	226	1205
44	Macau 3 (MAC)	426	374	395	391	370	357	2313
	Kot Ka Kit	219	172	206	188	185	183	1153
	Van Ka Kei	207	202	189	203	185	174	1160
45	Indonesia 2 (INA)	402	341	361	402	374	416	2296
	Dennis Ranova Pulunggono	184	176	166	168	200	224	1118
	Edwin Lioe	218	165	195	234	174	192	1178
46	Indonesia 1 (INA)	360	373	434	365	404	350	2286
	Haqi Rumandung	156	192	189	192	194	177	1100
	Hengki Susanto	204	181	245	173	210	173	1186
47	Brunei 1 (BRU)	394	410	364	383	339	389	2279
	Md Shahwall Hj Mustafa	215	227	175	193	189	173	1172
	Hj Yakob Hj Abu Bakar	179	183	189	190	150	216	1107
48	India 1 (IND)	357	333	374	368	409	418	2259
	Dinesh Kumar	172	170	170	180	179	183	1054
	Aswathanarayana Srinath	185	163	204	188	230	235	1205
49	Kazakhstan 2 (KAZ)	360	320	377	384	350	391	2182
	Abdrakhman Abinayev	179	126	178	176	146	193	998
	Kairat Baibolatov	181	194	199	208	204	198	1184
50	India 3 (IND)	419	365	353	367	291	375	2170
	Vijay Punjabi	195	167	184	180	138	202	1066
	Girish Ashok Gaba	224	198	169	187	153	173	1104
51	Uzbekistan 3 (UZB)	367	323	394	377	300	364	2125
	Khondamir Shaabdurakhmanov	169	132	202	175	147	166	991
	Bakhodir Arifov	198	191	192	202	153	198	1134
52	India 2 (IND)	365	345	373	372	329	330	2114
	Ajay Singh	178	185	185	179	167	166	1060
	Sethu Madhavan	187	160	188	193	162	164	1054
53	Uzbekistan 1 (UZB)	327	393	317	351	340	345	2073
	Sergey Sapov	168	192	158	193	144	156	1011
	Kudrat Khilyamov	159	201	159	158	196	189	1062
54	Kazakhstan 1 (KAZ)	399	349	298	301	372	289	2008
	Oleg Minulin	232	176	162	155	191	136	1052
	Makhmut Lazaridi	167	173	136	146	181	153	956
55	Uzbekistan 2 (UZB)	293	369	281	336	341	301	1921
	Ravshan Abdusamadov	156	145	102	179	164	145	891
	Shavkat Shakasimov	137	224	179	157	177	156	1030
56	Kazakhstan 3 (KAZ)	309	309	334	315	290	325	1882
	Yevgeniy Kuznetsov	161	142	163	151	149	132	898
	German Roshonok	148	167	171	164	141	193	984
Individuals
	Mohammad Aizat (BRU)	205	176	187	174	185	190	1117
	Wang Yingjun (CHN)	169	191	196	205	203	224	1188
