= Wrestling at the 2006 Asian Games – Men's Greco-Roman 60 kg =

Men's Greco-Roman 60 kg at the 2006 Asian Games
- Venue: Aspire Hall 4
- Date: 9 December 2006
- Competitors: 14 from 14 nations

Medalists
gold medal	Makoto Sasamoto	Japan
silver medal	Sheng Jiang	China
bronze medal	Dilshod Aripov	Uzbekistan
bronze medal	Ruslan Tyumenbayev	Kyrgyzstan

The men's Greco-Roman 60 kilograms wrestling competition at the 2006 Asian Games in Doha was held on 9 December 2006 at the Aspire Hall 4.

This Greco-Roman wrestling competition consisted of a single-elimination tournament, with a repechage used to determine the winner of two bronze medals. The two finalists faced off for gold and silver medals. Each wrestler who lost to one of the two finalists moved into the repechage, culminating in a pair of bronze medal matches featuring the semifinal losers each facing the remaining repechage opponent from their half of the bracket.

Each bout consisted of up to three rounds, lasting two minutes apiece. The wrestler who scored more points in each round was the winner of that rounds; the bout finished when one wrestler had won two rounds (and thus the match).

== Schedule ==
All times are Arabia Standard Time (UTC+03:00)

Date	Time	Event
Saturday, 9 December 2006	09:00	Preliminary
Saturday, 9 December 2006	09:00	Quarterfinals
Saturday, 9 December 2006	09:00	Semifinals
Saturday, 9 December 2006	09:00	Repechages
Saturday, 9 December 2006	18:00	Finals

== Results ==
Legend

- F — Won by fall

=== Main bracket ===
Preliminary
Sheng Jiang (CHN)	2	1	1
Dilshod Aripov (UZB)	0	1	1
Ravinder Singh (IND)	3	3
Ahmed Juma (IRQ)	0	0
Döwletberdi Mamedow (TKM)	0	0
Ruslan Tyumenbayev (KGZ)	5	3
Yasser Fallatah (KSA)	0	0
Makoto Sasamoto (JPN)	7	9^{F}
O Yun (PRK)	1	1
Nurbakyt Tengizbayev (KAZ)	4	1
Ali Ashkani (IRI)	0	1
Kang Kyung-il (KOR)	4	2

Quarterfinals
Mustafa Al-Nakadli (SYR)	3	7
Adnan Nosrati (QAT)	0	0
Sheng Jiang (CHN)	3	1	5
Ravinder Singh (IND)	1	2	2
Ruslan Tyumenbayev (KGZ)	0	0
Makoto Sasamoto (JPN)	6	6
Nurbakyt Tengizbayev (KAZ)	2	1	2
Kang Kyung-il (KOR)	1	4	1

Semifinals
Mustafa Al-Nakadli (SYR)	4	0	0
Sheng Jiang (CHN)	0	3	3
Makoto Sasamoto (JPN)	2	4
Nurbakyt Tengizbayev (KAZ)	2	1

Gold medal match
Sheng Jiang (CHN)	5	1	3
Makoto Sasamoto (JPN)	0	4	4

=== Repechage ===
Repechage
Dilshod Aripov (UZB)	5	4
Ravinder Singh (IND)	0	0
Yasser Fallatah (KSA)	0	2
Ruslan Tyumenbayev (KGZ)	10	11

Bronze medal match
Dilshod Aripov (UZB)	5	4^{F}
Mustafa Al-Nakadli (SYR)	0	0
Ruslan Tyumenbayev (KGZ)	0	2	2
Nurbakyt Tengizbayev (KAZ)	4	1	1

== Final standing ==
Rank	Athlete
1st place, gold medalist(s)	Makoto Sasamoto (JPN)
2nd place, silver medalist(s)	Sheng Jiang (CHN)
3rd place, bronze medalist(s)	Dilshod Aripov (UZB)
3rd place, bronze medalist(s)	Ruslan Tyumenbayev (KGZ)
5	Mustafa Al-Nakadli (SYR)
5	Nurbakyt Tengizbayev (KAZ)
7	Kang Kyung-il (KOR)
8	Ravinder Singh (IND)
9	O Yun (PRK)
10	Yasser Fallatah (KSA)
11	Ali Ashkani (IRI)
12	Ahmed Juma (IRQ)
13	Döwletberdi Mamedow (TKM)
14	Adnan Nosrati (QAT)
