= Shooting at the 2014 Asian Games – Men's 50 metre rifle prone =

Men's 50 metre rifle prone at the 2014 Asian Games
- Venue: Ongnyeon International Shooting Range
- Dates: 25 September 2014
- Competitors: 53 from 21 nations

Medalists
gold medal	Zhao Shengbo	China
silver medal	Ezuan Nasir Khan	Malaysia
bronze medal	Park Bong-duk	South Korea

The men's 50 metre rifle prone competition at the 2014 Asian Games in Incheon, South Korea was held on 25 September at the Ongnyeon International Shooting Range.

== Schedule ==
All times are Korea Standard Time (UTC+09:00)

Date	Time	Event
Thursday, 25 September 2014	09:00	Qualification
Thursday, 25 September 2014	11:30	Final

== Records ==
Prior to this competition, the existing world, Asian and Games records were as follows.

Qualification
World Record	Sergey Kamenskiy (RUS)	632.3	Granada, Spain	11 September 2014
Asian Record	Liu Gang (CHN)	629.6	Fort Benning, United States	2 April 2014
Games Record	—	—	—	—
Final
World Record	Henri Junghänel (GER)	211.2	Munich, Germany	11 November 2013
Asian Record	Zhao Shengbo (CHN)	209.0	Maribor, Slovenia	17 June 2014
Games Record	—	—	—	—

== Results ==
Legend

- DNS — Did not start

=== Qualification ===
Rank	Athlete	Series						Total	Notes
Rank	Athlete	1	2	3	4	5	6	Total	Notes
1	Zhao Shengbo (CHN)	104.4	103.7	104.0	103.6	105.0	105.5	626.2	GR
2	Lan Xing (CHN)	103.9	104.7	102.7	105.7	105.1	103.5	625.6	
3	Liu Gang (CHN)	103.4	103.8	104.2	104.2	106.1	102.5	624.2	
4	Kwon Jun-cheol (KOR)	102.7	104.1	104.5	103.9	104.0	104.6	623.8	
5	Attapon Uea-aree (THA)	104.7	103.6	103.5	104.2	103.7	103.1	622.8	
6	Park Bong-duk (KOR)	103.4	104.1	104.8	103.1	103.2	104.1	622.7	
7	You Jae-jin (KOR)	103.9	103.0	105.4	103.2	102.8	104.2	622.5	
8	Ezuan Nasir Khan (MAS)	102.1	105.1	102.9	103.3	104.2	104.6	622.2	
9	Ratmir Mindiyarov (KAZ)	103.0	103.5	105.6	102.7	103.6	103.5	621.9	
10	Joydeep Karmakar (IND)	103.8	103.9	103.1	104.3	103.3	102.8	621.2	
11	Yuriy Yurkov (KAZ)	103.8	102.3	103.8	102.5	102.3	105.0	619.7	
12	Olzodyn Enkhsaikhan (MGL)	101.9	102.9	104.1	103.4	102.6	104.4	619.3	
13	Janchivdorjiin Gankhuyag (MGL)	103.1	103.6	104.4	101.0	103.9	102.9	618.9	
14	Gagan Narang (IND)	103.3	102.7	102.2	102.8	102.9	104.5	618.4	
15	Khalid Al-Anazi (KSA)	103.9	101.9	102.7	103.2	104.5	101.9	618.1	
16	Tevarit Majchacheep (THA)	102.9	103.9	102.6	103.8	102.4	102.4	618.0	
17	Mehdi Jafari Pouya (IRI)	102.5	102.4	103.7	102.9	105.1	101.2	617.8	
18	Igor Pirekeyev (KAZ)	102.1	102.0	103.2	101.6	105.5	103.0	617.4	
19	Midori Yajima (JPN)	103.4	100.6	105.7	104.6	101.3	101.5	617.1	
20	Ali Al-Muhannadi (QAT)	104.5	101.6	103.2	100.6	100.5	104.7	615.1	
21	Toshikazu Yamashita (JPN)	104.0	103.2	102.9	102.2	101.1	101.7	615.1	
22	Abdulrahman Al-Juhaydili (KSA)	102.1	103.0	102.6	102.5	101.4	103.4	615.0	
23	Jamal Al-Sebbah (BRN)	103.4	102.0	102.4	102.8	102.2	102.2	615.0	
24	Nguyễn Duy Hoàng (VIE)	102.2	102.9	104.5	101.3	101.6	102.0	614.5	
25	Sasan Shahsavari (IRI)	102.2	103.5	102.4	102.1	101.9	102.3	614.4	
26	Mohd Hadafi Jaafar (MAS)	102.0	103.4	103.0	101.2	101.9	102.7	614.2	
27	Nyantain Bayaraa (MGL)	103.4	102.5	102.0	101.6	102.1	102.1	613.7	
28	Hossein Bagheri (IRI)	101.2	100.3	102.6	101.5	103.3	104.3	613.2	
29	Hariom Singh (IND)	101.7	101.7	102.1	102.2	101.6	103.9	613.2	
30	Takayuki Matsumoto (JPN)	103.7	100.8	101.3	101.6	103.0	101.9	612.3	
31	Vyacheslav Skoromnov (QAT)	100.4	99.9	103.9	102.9	103.9	101.3	612.3	
32	Lin Aung (MYA)	101.6	99.8	102.5	102.2	102.0	103.3	611.4	
33	Porapon Worayuttakarn (THA)	100.3	100.5	102.9	102.5	103.0	102.0	611.2	
34	Hamed Al-Khatri (OMA)	99.4	102.5	100.1	103.6	103.1	101.8	610.5	
35	Wai Yan Min Thu (MYA)	102.2	101.7	101.0	101.2	102.2	102.0	610.3	
36	Pavel Savinich (UZB)	99.5	99.9	103.4	101.9	101.5	103.4	609.6	
37	Mohammed Al-Hattali (OMA)	100.2	103.8	102.5	103.0	101.0	99.0	609.5	
38	Ayaz Tahir (PAK)	100.5	99.6	101.1	101.3	102.4	104.3	609.2	
39	Abdulaziz Al-Anazi (KSA)	103.7	101.5	102.1	99.9	102.4	99.6	609.2	
40	Hassan Abdul Gafoor (MDV)	101.5	101.0	102.8	99.8	101.7	102.3	609.1	
41	Siddique Umer (PAK)	99.4	102.7	101.9	102.0	102.3	100.6	608.9	
42	Khaled Al-Subaie (KUW)	96.7	100.1	102.7	103.2	103.9	102.1	608.7	
43	Sinan Al-Nasri (OMA)	99.8	101.7	102.0	101.9	101.8	101.3	608.5	
44	Nguyễn Thành Đạt (VIE)	99.3	102.9	101.9	101.2	100.2	102.9	608.4	
45	Abdulla Al-Madeed (QAT)	101.2	101.8	101.2	99.2	102.3	102.3	608.0	
46	Mohd Zubair Mohammad (MAS)	101.5	100.0	99.1	102.4	100.5	102.0	605.5	
47	Dương Anh Quân (VIE)	99.0	100.6	100.0	99.3	99.5	103.6	602.0	
48	Ong Jun Hong (SIN)	99.2	99.2	100.8	98.0	102.7	101.8	601.7	
49	Ruslan Ismailov (KGZ)	100.0	99.2	97.9	98.3	101.0	102.2	598.6	
50	Ibrahim Simad (MDV)	101.2	102.2	99.0	93.8	98.1	97.9	592.2	
51	Majed Al-Osaimi (KUW)	86.9	101.7	101.8	99.4	102.7	99.4	591.9	
52	Ahmed Mumthaz (MDV)	100.4	98.1	99.3	98.3	98.7	96.1	590.9	
—	Salman Hasan Zaman (BRN)							DNS	

=== Final ===
Rank	Athlete	1st stage		2nd stage – Elimination							S-off	Notes
Rank	Athlete	1	2	1	2	3	4	5	6	7	S-off	Notes
1st place, gold medalist(s)	Zhao Shengbo (CHN)	31.6	62.5	83.6	104.3	125.3	146.2	167.3	188.9	209.1		AR
2nd place, silver medalist(s)	Ezuan Nasir Khan (MAS)	31.5	62.7	83.2	104.1	125.6	146.2	166.7	187.6	208.5		
3rd place, bronze medalist(s)	Park Bong-duk (KOR)	30.1	62.2	83.4	104.4	124.9	145.5	166.1	186.6			
4	You Jae-jin (KOR)	31.2	61.8	82.4	103.3	124.3	145.1	165.6				
5	Kwon Jun-cheol (KOR)	30.5	61.3	81.1	102.5	122.2	143.0					
6	Attapon Uea-aree (THA)	30.2	60.3	81.1	102.1	121.4						
7	Lan Xing (CHN)	30.1	61.2	81.8	101.9							
8	Liu Gang (CHN)	29.9	60.1	79.1								
