= Shooting at the 2014 Asian Games – Men's 50 metre rifle prone team =

Men's 50 metre rifle prone team at the 2014 Asian Games
- Venue: Ongnyeon International Shooting Range
- Dates: 25 September 2014
- Competitors: 42 from 14 nations

Medalists
gold medal	China; Lan Xing, Liu Gang, Zhao Shengbo
silver medal	South Korea; Kwon Jun-cheol, Park Bong-duk, You Jae-jin
bronze medal	Kazakhstan; Ratmir Mindiyarov, Igor Pirekeyev, Yuriy Yurkov

The men's 50 metre rifle prone team competition at the 2014 Asian Games in Incheon, South Korea was held on 25 September at the Ongnyeon International Shooting Range.

== Schedule ==
All times are Korea Standard Time (UTC+09:00)

Date	Time	Event
Thursday, 25 September 2014	09:00	Final

== Records ==
Prior to this competition, the existing world, Asian and Games records were as follows.

World Record	France	1873.6	Osijek, Croatia	23 July 2013
Asian Record	China	1870.8	Granada, Spain	10 September 2014
Games Record	—	—	—	—

== Results ==
Rank	Team	Series						Total	Notes
Rank	Team	1	2	3	4	5	6	Total	Notes
1st place, gold medalist(s)	China (CHN)	311.7	312.2	310.9	313.5	316.2	311.5	1876.0	WR
	Lan Xing	103.9	104.7	102.7	105.7	105.1	103.5	625.6	
	Liu Gang	103.4	103.8	104.2	104.2	106.1	102.5	624.2	
	Zhao Shengbo	104.4	103.7	104.0	103.6	105.0	105.5	626.2	
2nd place, silver medalist(s)	South Korea (KOR)	310.0	311.2	314.7	310.2	310.0	312.9	1869.0	
	Kwon Jun-cheol	102.7	104.1	104.5	103.9	104.0	104.6	623.8	
	Park Bong-duk	103.4	104.1	104.8	103.1	103.2	104.1	622.7	
	You Jae-jin	103.9	103.0	105.4	103.2	102.8	104.2	622.5	
3rd place, bronze medalist(s)	Kazakhstan (KAZ)	308.9	307.8	312.6	306.8	311.4	311.5	1859.0	
	Ratmir Mindiyarov	103.0	103.5	105.6	102.7	103.6	103.5	621.9	
	Igor Pirekeyev	102.1	102.0	103.2	101.6	105.5	103.0	617.4	
	Yuriy Yurkov	103.8	102.3	103.8	102.5	102.3	105.0	619.7	
4	India (IND)	308.8	308.3	307.4	309.3	307.8	311.2	1852.8	
	Joydeep Karmakar	103.8	103.9	103.1	104.3	103.3	102.8	621.2	
	Gagan Narang	103.3	102.7	102.2	102.8	102.9	104.5	618.4	
	Hariom Singh	101.7	101.7	102.1	102.2	101.6	103.9	613.2	
5	Thailand (THA)	307.9	308.0	309.0	310.5	309.1	307.5	1852.0	
	Tevarit Majchacheep	102.9	103.9	102.6	103.8	102.4	102.4	618.0	
	Attapon Uea-aree	104.7	103.6	103.5	104.2	103.7	103.1	622.8	
	Porapon Worayuttakarn	100.3	100.5	102.9	102.5	103.0	102.0	611.2	
6	Mongolia (MGL)	308.4	309.0	310.5	306.0	308.6	309.4	1851.9	
	Nyantain Bayaraa	103.4	102.5	102.0	101.6	102.1	102.1	613.7	
	Olzodyn Enkhsaikhan	101.9	102.9	104.1	103.4	102.6	104.4	619.3	
	Janchivdorjiin Gankhuyag	103.1	103.6	104.4	101.0	103.9	102.9	618.9	
7	Iran (IRI)	305.9	306.2	308.7	306.5	310.3	307.8	1845.4	
	Hossein Bagheri	101.2	100.3	102.6	101.5	103.3	104.3	613.2	
	Mehdi Jafari Pouya	102.5	102.4	103.7	102.9	105.1	101.2	617.8	
	Sasan Shahsavari	102.2	103.5	102.4	102.1	101.9	102.3	614.4	
8	Japan (JPN)	311.1	304.6	309.9	308.4	305.4	305.1	1844.5	
	Takayuki Matsumoto	103.7	100.8	101.3	101.6	103.0	101.9	612.3	
	Midori Yajima	103.4	100.6	105.7	104.6	101.3	101.5	617.1	
	Toshikazu Yamashita	104.0	103.2	102.9	102.2	101.1	101.7	615.1	
9	Saudi Arabia (KSA)	309.7	306.4	307.4	305.6	308.3	304.9	1842.3	
	Abdulaziz Al-Anazi	103.7	101.5	102.1	99.9	102.4	99.6	609.2	
	Khalid Al-Anazi	103.9	101.9	102.7	103.2	104.5	101.9	618.1	
	Abdulrahman Al-Juhaydili	102.1	103.0	102.6	102.5	101.4	103.4	615.0	
10	Malaysia (MAS)	305.6	308.5	305.0	306.9	306.6	309.3	1841.9	
	Mohd Hadafi Jaafar	102.0	103.4	103.0	101.2	101.9	102.7	614.2	
	Ezuan Nasir Khan	102.1	105.1	102.9	103.3	104.2	104.6	622.2	
	Mohd Zubair Mohammad	101.5	100.0	99.1	102.4	100.5	102.0	605.5	
11	Qatar (QAT)	306.1	303.3	308.3	302.7	306.7	308.3	1835.4	
	Abdulla Al-Madeed	101.2	101.8	101.2	99.2	102.3	102.3	608.0	
	Ali Al-Muhannadi	104.5	101.6	103.2	100.6	100.5	104.7	615.1	
	Vyacheslav Skoromnov	100.4	99.9	103.9	102.9	103.9	101.3	612.3	
12	Oman (OMA)	299.4	308.0	304.6	308.5	305.9	302.1	1828.5	
	Mohammed Al-Hattali	100.2	103.8	102.5	103.0	101.0	99.0	609.5	
	Hamed Al-Khatri	99.4	102.5	100.1	103.6	103.1	101.8	610.5	
	Sinan Al-Nasri	99.8	101.7	102.0	101.9	101.8	101.3	608.5	
13	Vietnam (VIE)	300.5	306.4	306.4	301.8	301.3	308.5	1824.9	
	Dương Anh Quân	99.0	100.6	100.0	99.3	99.5	103.6	602.0	
	Nguyễn Duy Hoàng	102.2	102.9	104.5	101.3	101.6	102.0	614.5	
	Nguyễn Thành Đạt	99.3	102.9	101.9	101.2	100.2	102.9	608.4	
14	Maldives (MDV)	303.1	301.3	301.1	291.9	298.5	296.3	1792.2	
	Hassan Abdul Gafoor	101.5	101.0	102.8	99.8	101.7	102.3	609.1	
	Ahmed Mumthaz	100.4	98.1	99.3	98.3	98.7	96.1	590.9	
	Ibrahim Simad	101.2	102.2	99.0	93.8	98.1	97.9	592.2	
