= Shooting at the 2014 Asian Games – Men's double trap =

Men's double trap at the 2014 Asian Games
- Venue: Gyeonggido Shooting Range
- Dates: 25 September 2014
- Competitors: 28 from 11 nations

Medalists
gold medal	Hu Binyuan	China
silver medal	Fehaid Al-Deehani	Kuwait
bronze medal	Juma Al-Maktoum	United Arab Emirates

The men's double trap competition at the 2014 Asian Games in Incheon, South Korea was held on 25 September at the Gyeonggido Shooting Range.

== Schedule ==
All times are Korea Standard Time (UTC+09:00)

Date	Time	Event
Thursday, 25 September 2014	09:00	Qualification
Thursday, 25 September 2014	14:30	Semifinal
Thursday, 25 September 2014	14:30	Finals

== Records ==
Prior to this competition, the existing world, Asian and Games records were as follows.

World Record	Tim Kneale (GBR)	148	Munich, Germany	9 June 2014
Asian Record	Wang Hao (CHN)	146	Munich, Germany	9 June 2014
Games Record	—	—	—	—

== Results ==
Legend

- DNS — Did not start

=== Qualification ===
Rank	Athlete	Round					Total	S-off	Notes
Rank	Athlete	1	2	3	4	5	Total	S-off	Notes
1	Fehaid Al-Deehani (KUW)	29	30	28	28	27	142		GR
2	Juma Al-Maktoum (UAE)	29	25	28	29	28	139		
3	Shin Hyun-woo (KOR)	29	29	29	26	26	139		
4	Hu Binyuan (CHN)	26	27	28	28	29	138		
5	Masoud Hamad Al-Athba (QAT)	26	28	28	26	29	137		
6	Rashid Hamad Al-Athba (QAT)	27	27	26	29	27	136	+2	
7	Ankur Mittal (IND)	26	27	29	26	28	136	+0	
8	Hwang Sung-jin (KOR)	27	29	27	27	25	135		
9	Mo Junjie (CHN)	26	25	29	28	26	134		
10	Saif Al-Shamsi (UAE)	25	27	24	28	29	133		
11	Elias Kaadi (LIB)	27	25	27	24	29	132		
12	Li Jun (CHN)	25	26	28	25	28	132		
13	Ahmad Al-Afasi (KUW)	26	27	27	25	27	132		
14	Amir Chavoshi (IRI)	25	23	27	28	28	131		
15	Hamad Al-Marri (QAT)	26	26	24	27	28	131		
16	Sangram Dahiya (IND)	26	26	26	26	27	131		
17	Mohammed Asab (IND)	27	25	26	26	27	131		
18	Elie Akiki (LIB)	25	26	27	28	25	131		
19	Wissam Khalil (LIB)	26	27	28	27	23	131		
20	Hamad Al-Afasi (KUW)	27	22	28	26	27	130		
21	Benjamin Khor (MAS)	26	28	26	23	26	129		
22	Khaled Al-Kaabi (UAE)	26	25	28	23	26	128		
23	Chun Hong-jae (KOR)	26	27	23	27	24	127		
24	Siavash Khoshnevis (IRI)	23	25	25	28	25	126		
25	Khor Seng Chye (MAS)	26	24	23	26	25	124		
26	Salim Al-Hamidhi (OMA)	25	21	23	26	24	119		
27	Shih Wei-tin (TPE)	24	23	22	27	23	119		
—	Masoud Azizian (IRI)						DNS		

=== Semifinal ===
Rank	Athlete	Score	S-off
1	Hu Binyuan (CHN)	30	
2	Fehaid Al-Deehani (KUW)	29	
3	Juma Al-Maktoum (UAE)	28	
4	Rashid Hamad Al-Athba (QAT)	26	
5	Shin Hyun-woo (KOR)	25	
6	Masoud Hamad Al-Athba (QAT)	23	

=== Finals ===
==== Bronze medal match ====
Rank	Athlete	Score	S-off
3rd place, bronze medalist(s)	Juma Al-Maktoum (UAE)	29	
4	Rashid Hamad Al-Athba (QAT)	28	

==== Gold medal match ====
Rank	Athlete	Score	S-off
1st place, gold medalist(s)	Hu Binyuan (CHN)	26	
2nd place, silver medalist(s)	Fehaid Al-Deehani (KUW)	25	
