= Saudi Arabia at the 2006 Asian Games =

- IOC code: KSA
- NOC: Saudi Arabian Olympic Committee

in Doha
- Medals Ranked 13th: Gold 8 Silver 0 Bronze 6 Total 14

Asian Games appearances (overview)
- 1978; 1982; 1986; 1990; 1994; 1998; 2002; 2006; 2010; 2014; 2018; 2022; 2026

Saudi Arabia participated in the 2006 Asian Games, held in Doha, Qatar from 1 to 15 December 2006. Saudi Arabia ranked 13th with 8 gold medals.

== Medalists ==
Medal	Name	Sport	Event	Date
Gold	Hassan Al-Shaikh; Bader Al-Shaikh	Bowling	Men's doubles	4
Gold	Bader Al-Shaikh	Bowling	Men's all-events	8
Gold	Yahya Habeeb	Athletics	Men's 100 metres	9
Gold	Hussein Al-Sabee	Athletics	Men's long jump	9
Gold	Hamdan Al-Bishi	Athletics	Men's 400 metres	10
Gold	Sultan Al-Hebshi	Athletics	Men's shot put	11
Gold	Khaled Al-Eid; Abdullah Al-Saud; Kamal Bahamdan; Abdullah Al-Sharbatly	Equestrian	Team jumping	11
Gold	Ismail Al-Sabiani; Hamed Al-Bishi; Mohammed Al-Salhi; Hamdan Al-Bishi	Athletics	Men's 4 × 400 metres relay	12
Bronze	Bader Al-Shaikh; Faisal Al-Juraifani; Hassan Al-Shaikh	Bowling	Men's trios	6
Bronze	Hassan Al-Shaikh; Bader Al-Shaikh; Faisal Al-Juraifani; Ahmed Al-Hdyan; Yousif Akbar; Faisal Sugati	Bowling	Men's team	8
Bronze	Ahmed Faiz	Athletics	Men's long jump	9
Bronze	Sultan Al-Dawoodi	Athletics	Men's discus throw	10
Bronze	Thamer Al-Malki	Karate	Men's kumite 55 kg	12
Bronze	Ahmed Al-Bakhit; Naif Al-Buhassoun; Yahya Hanash; Ibrahim Al-Harbi; Abdullah Al-Bahli; Sharif Al-Khalifa; Khalil Hajji; Thamer Al-Dossari; Khalid Ozaibi; Ismail Al-Khaibari; Masfer Al-Bishi; Yasser Al-Makawni	Volleyball	Men	14
