= United Arab Emirates at the 2006 Asian Games =

- IOC code: UAE
- NOC: United Arab Emirates National Olympic Committee

in Doha 1 to 15 December
- Flag bearer: Maitha bint Mohammed bin Rashid Al Maktoum
- Medals Ranked 20th: Gold 3 Silver 4 Bronze 3 Total 10

Asian Games appearances (overview)
- 1978; 1982; 1986; 1990; 1994; 1998; 2002; 2006; 2010; 2014; 2018; 2022; 2026

The United Arab Emirates participated in the 2006 Asian Games held in Doha, Qatar from December 1 to December 15, 2006. The United Arab Emirates ranked 20th with 3 gold medals in this edition of the Asiad.

== Medalists ==
Medal	Name	Sport	Event	Date
Gold	Mohammed Salem Al-Zahmi	Bodybuilding	Men's 65 kg	8
Gold	Rashid Al-Maktoum	Equestrian	Individual endurance	14
Gold	Rashid Al-Maktoum; Hamdan Al-Maktoum; Ahmed Al-Maktoum; Majid Al-Maktoum	Equestrian	Team endurance	14
Silver	Jamal Ali Mohammed; Nayef Eqab	Bowling	Men's doubles	4
Silver	Nayef Eqab	Bowling	Men's all-events	8
Silver	Saeed Al-Maktoum	Shooting	Men's skeet	8
Silver	Maitha Al-Maktoum	Karate	Women's kumite +60 kg	13
Bronze	Mahmood Al-Attar	Bowling	Men's singles	3
Bronze	Latifa Al-Maktoum; Abdullah Al-Marri; Abdullah Al-Muhairi; Mohamed Al-Kumaiti	Equestrian	Team jumping	11
Bronze	Sultan Bin Sulayem	Equestrian	Individual endurance	14
