= Hong Kong at the 2014 Asian Games =

- IOC code: HKG
- NOC: Sports Federation and Olympic Committee of Hong Kong, China

in Incheon
- Medals Ranked 13th: Gold 6 Silver 11 Bronze 25 Total 42

Asian Games appearances (overview)
- 1954; 1958; 1962; 1966; 1970; 1974; 1978; 1982; 1986; 1990; 1994; 1998; 2002; 2006; 2010; 2014; 2018; 2022; 2026

Hong Kong participated in the 2014 Asian Games in Incheon, South Korea from 19 September to 4 October 2014.

== Medal summary ==
=== Medalists ===
Medal	Name	Sport	Event	Date
Gold	Lee Wai Sze	Track cycling	Women's sprint	25 Sep
Gold	Lee Wai Sze	Track cycling	Women's keirin	21 Sep
Gold	Shek Wai Hung	Gymnastics	Men's vault	25 Sep
Gold	Lok Kwan Hoi	Rowing	Men's lightweight single sculls	24 Sep
Gold	Cheng Kwok Fai	Sailing	Men's Mistral	30 Sep
Gold	Hayley Chan	Sailing	MWomen's RS:X	30 Sep
Silver	Wu Siu Hong	Bowling	Men's masters	2 Oct
Bronze	Camille Cheng; Stephanie Au; Sze Hang Yu; Siobhán Haughey	Swimming	Women's 4 × 100 metre freestyle relay	21 Sep
Bronze	Camille Cheng; Stephanie Au; Sze Hang Yu; Siobhán Haughey	Swimming	Women's 4 × 200 metre freestyle relay	23 Sep
Bronze	Geoffrey Cheah; Jeremy Wong; Derick Ng; Kent Cheung; Raymond Mak; David Wong	Swimming	Men's 4 × 100 metre freestyle relay	24 Sep
Bronze	Stephanie Au; Yvette Kong; Sze Hang Yu; Siobhán Haughey; Claudia Lau; Jamie Yeung; Chan Kin Lok; Tam Hoi Lam	Swimming	Women's 4 × 100 metre medley relay	25 Sep
Bronze	Wei Nan	Badminton	Men's singles	28 Sep
Bronze	Wicky Yeung; Kam Siu Lun; Eric Tseng; Wu Siu Hong; Michael Mak; Chan Yat Long	Bowling	Men's team	29 Sep
Bronze	Tang Yik Chun; So Chun Hong; Ng Ka Fung; Tsui Chi Ho	Athletics	Men's 4 × 100 metres relay	29 Sep

Last updated 4 October 2014

== Delegation List ==
All members ：

NOC Representatives

- OCA Vice President & NOC President

FOK Timothy Tsun Ting (霍震霆)

- NOC Hon. Secretary General

PANG Chung (彭冲)
Headquarters

- Chef de Mission

KWOK Chi Leung Karl (郭志樑)

- Deputy Chef de Mission

LAU Chiang Chu Vivien (劉掌珠)
Thomas Brian STEVENSON (施文信)
PUI Kwan Kay (貝鈞奇)

- Headquarters Official

LEUNG Mee Lee (梁美莉)
FOK Kai Kong Kenneth (霍啟剛)

- Asian Federation Representatives

YUE Kwok Leung (余國樑)
HU Shao Ming Herman (胡曉明)
TONG Wai Lun (湯徫掄)
WONG Man Chiu Ronnie (王敏超)
