= Lee Yu Wen =

Singaporean ten-pin bowler (born 1980)

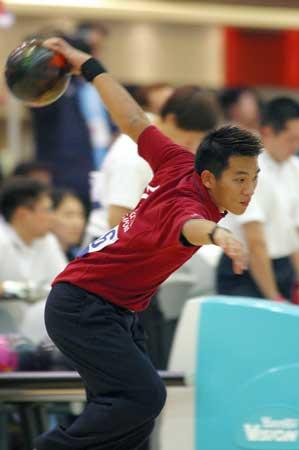
Lee Yu-Wen bowling at the 2002 Asian Games.

Lee Yu-Wen (born December 21, 1980) is a Singaporean bowler.

== Sports career ==
Lee started bowling when he was 14 years old, and was selected to join the national team in April 2001. His first major tournament was the 2001 SEA Games, where he won a bronze medal in the Trios event. Upon his return, he won the Cathay Bowl Junior Classic and dedicated his win to his father who had died weeks earlier. Lee then went on to win the Champion of Champions title.

His run continued into 2002 with a victory at the Vietnam Open. Lee then hit his career high, winning a Gold medal for Trios (with Remy Ong and Sam Goh) at the 14th Asian Games.

Since then he has won the prestigious Qatar Open (2005) (with a cash prize of US$40000) as well as the 39th edition of the Singapore Open (2006).

Although that meant the start of a 3-year title drought, but he emerged once more at the 40th Singapore National Championship as Champion over Remy Ong in 2009.

== Other pursuits ==
In addition to his love of all sports, Lee's other passions include singing and dancing. He was a cast member in The Toy Factory's productions of Army Daze and Spring Singing.
