= United Arab Emirates at the 2014 Asian Games =

- IOC code: UAE
- NOC: United Arab Emirates National Olympic Committee

in Incheon
- Competitors: 89 in 7 sports
- Medals Ranked 25th: Gold 1 Silver 0 Bronze 3 Total 4

Asian Games appearances (overview)
- 1978; 1982; 1986; 1990; 1994; 1998; 2002; 2006; 2010; 2014; 2018; 2022; 2026

United Arab Emirates participated in the 2014 Asian Games in Incheon, South Korea from 19 September to 4 October 2014.

== Medalists ==
Medal	Name	Sport	Event
Gold	Alia Saeed Mohammed	Athletics	Women's 10,000 metres
Bronze	Shaker Ali Al-Hassan	Bowling	Men's masters
Bronze	Marwan Al-Maazmi	Karate	Men's individual kata
Bronze	Juma Al-Maktoum	Shooting	Men's double trap
