= Bader Al-Shaikh =

Saudi bowler

Personal information
- Nationality: Saudi Arabian
- Education: King Saud University

Sport
- Sport: Bowling
Medal record
Bowling
Representing Saudi Arabia
Asian Games
Gold medal – first place	2006 Doha	doubles
Gold medal – first place	2006 Doha	all-events
Bronze medal – third place	2006 Doha	team
Bronze medal – third place	2006 Doha	trios

Bader Al-Shaikh also spelt Badr Al-Shaikh, is a Saudi bowler. He is known for his performance at the 2006 Asian Games, where he won two gold and two bronze medals. In 2017, he became president of the Saudi Bowling Federation.

== Early life ==
His father is Abdullah Al-Shaikh. His brother is fellow bowler and Asian games gold medalist Hassan. He studied petroleum engineering at the King Saud University.

== Career ==
He won gold at the 2006 Asian Games in doubles, partnered with Hassan. He also won gold at the all events category, with a combined score of 5482. He was part of the Saudi team which won bronze at the team competition, and the trio which won bronze at the trios competition.

At the 2007 Asian Indoor Games, he stood 37th in the singles category. Partnered with Hassan, he stood 7th in doubles.

He participated at the 2014 Asian Games, ranking 28th in the men's singles category. Partnered with Abdullah Al-Dolijan, he placed 30th in doubles.

=== Presidency of SBF ===
In 2017, he became president of the Saudi Bowling Federation. During his presidency, the first national women's team was formed in 2018.
