= Sithiphol Kunaksorn =

Thai ten-pin bowling player

Sithiphol Kunaksorn is a bowling player from Thailand. He has played and won various national and international tournaments and won the Bronze at the 2014 Asian Games in Incheon.
