= Wu Siu Hong =

Hong Kong ten-pin bowling player

Wu Siu Hong (Chinese: 胡兆康; Jyutping: wu^{4} siu^{6} hong^{1}; born October 22, 1984) is a ten-pin bowling player from Hong Kong who won the 2015 QubicaAMF Bowling World Cup.
