= Malaysia at the 2006 Asian Games =

- IOC code: MAS
- NOC: Olympic Council of Malaysia
- Website: www.olympic.org.my (in English)

in Doha
- Competitors: 244 in 23 sports
- Flag bearer: Josiah Ng
- Medals Ranked 11th: Gold 8 Silver 17 Bronze 17 Total 42

Asian Games appearances (overview)
- 1954; 1958; 1962; 1966; 1970; 1974; 1978; 1982; 1986; 1990; 1994; 1998; 2002; 2006; 2010; 2014; 2018; 2022; 2026

Other related appearances
- North Borneo (1954, 1958, 1962); Sarawak (1962)

Malaysia competed in the 2006 Asian Games in Doha, Qatar. The country was represented by 244 athletes competing in 23 of the 39 sports provided. Among the popular sports were aquatics, athletics, badminton, bodybuilding, bowling, cycling, hockey, football, golf, gymnastics, kabaddi, karate-do, sepak takraw, squash, table tennis, taekwondo, weightlifting and wushu. Athletes from Malaysia won overall 42 medals (including eight golds), and clinched the eleventh spot in the medal table. Abdullah Sani Karim was the chief of the delegation.

== Medal summary ==
=== Medals by sport ===
Sport	Gold	Silver	Bronze	Total	Rank
Athletics	0	1	1	2	16
Badminton	1	0	3	4	4
Bodybuilding	0	1	0	1	9
Bowling	3	3	0	6	2
Cue sports	0	1	0	1	9
Cycling	0	1	0	1	7
Diving	0	1	3	4	3
Equestrian	0	1	2	3	6
Gymnastics	0	1	0	1	6
Karate	0	4	3	7	8
Sailing	1	0	1	2	7
Sepaktakraw	0	2	1	3	4
Squash	2	1	1	4	1
Wushu	1	0	2	3	3
Total	8	17	17	42	11

=== Multiple medalists ===
Malaysian competitors that have won at least two medals.

Name	Sport	Gold	Silver	Bronze	Total
Esther Cheah	Bowling	2	3		5
Shalin Zulkifli	Bowling	1	1		2
Zandra Aziela Ibrahim	Bowling	1	1		2
Koo Kien Keat	Badminton	1		1	2
Tan Boon Heong	Badminton	1		1	2
Azlan Mubin	Sepaktakraw		2		2
Mohd Normanizam Ahmad	Sepaktakraw		2		2
Muhd Futra Abdul Ghani	Sepaktakraw		2		2
Sulaiman Salleh	Sepaktakraw		2		2
Zulkarnain Arif	Sepaktakraw		2		2
Azman Nasruddin	Sepaktakraw		1	1	2
Qabil Ambak Mahamad Fathil	Equestrian		1	1	2
Saufi Salleh	Sepaktakraw		1	1	2
Elizabeth Jimie	Diving			2	2
Lee Chong Wei	Badminton			2	2
Leong Mun Yee	Diving			2	2
Mohd Fairuzizuan Mohd Tazari	Badminton			2	2
Wong Pei Tty	Badminton			2	2

=== Medallists ===
The following Malaysian competitors won medals at the games; all dates are for December 2006.

Medal	Name	Sport	Event	Date
Gold	Koo Kien Keat; Tan Boon Heong	Badminton	Men's doubles	9
Gold	Aaron Kong; Ben Heng; Daniel Lim	Bowling	Men's trios	6
Gold	Esther Cheah	Bowling	Women's singles	3
Gold	Esther Cheah; Sharon Koh; Wendy Chai; Zandra Aziela Ibrahim; Shalin Zulkifli; Choy Poh Lai	Bowling	Women's team	8
Gold	Rufina Tan	Sailing	Women's optimist	12
Gold	Ong Beng Hee	Squash	Men's singles	14
Gold	Nicol David	Squash	Women's singles	14
Gold	Chai Fong Ying	Wushu	Women's taijiquan	13
Silver	Roslinda Samsu	Athletics	Women's pole vault	12
Silver	Sazali Samad	Bodybuilding	Men's 65 kg	8
Silver	Esther Cheah; Zandra Aziela Ibrahim; Shalin Zulkifli	Bowling	Women's trios	6
Silver	Esther Cheah	Bowling	Women's all-events	8
Silver	Esther Cheah	Bowling	Women's masters	10
Silver	Esther Kwan Suet Yee	Cue sports	Women's nine-ball singles	11
Silver	Josiah Ng	Cycling	Men's keirin	14
Silver	Rossharisham Roslan; Yeoh Ken Nee	Diving	Men's synchronised 3 metre springboard	10
Silver	Diani Lee Cheng; Putri Alia Soraya; Nur Quzandria Mahamad Fathil; Qabil Ambak Mahamad Fathil	Equestrian	Team dressage	4
Silver	Ng Shu Wai	Gymnastics	Men's vault	6
Silver	Ku Jin Keat	Karate	Men's individual kata	12
Silver	Puvaneswaran Ramasamy	Karate	Men's kumite 55 kg	12
Silver	Kunasilan Lakanathan	Karate	Men's kumite 60 kg	12
Silver	Vasantha Marial Anthony	Karate	Women's kumite 48 kg	12
Silver	Normanizam Ahmad; Sulaiman Salleh; Futra Abd Ghani; Azlan Mubin; Zulkarnain Arif	Sepaktakraw	Men's regu	10
Silver	Normanizam Ahmad; Sulaiman Salleh; Saifudin Hussin; Ahmad Sufi Hashim; Futra Abd Ghani; Azlan Mubin; Azman Nasruddin; Noor Ariffin Pawanteh; Zulhafizazudin Rosslan; Zulkarnain Arif; Rukman Mustapha; Saufi Salleh	Sepaktakraw	Men's team	6
Silver	Mohd Azlan Iskandar	Squash	Men's singles	13
Bronze	Noraseela Mohd Khalid	Athletics	Women's 400 metres hurdles	10
Bronze	Lee Chong Wei	Badminton	Men's singles	9
Bronze	Mohd Fairuzizuan Mohd Tazari; Wong Pei Tty	Badminton	Mixed doubles	8
Bronze	Muhammad Hafiz Hashim; Koo Kien Keat; Kuan Beng Hong; Lee Chong Wei; Lin Woon Fui; Mohd Fairuzizuan Mohd Tazari; Tan Boon Heong; Wong Choong Hann	Badminton	Men's team	5
Bronze	Elizabeth Jimie	Diving	Women's 1 metre springboard	12
Bronze	Leong Mun Yee	Diving	Women's 3 metre springboard	13
Bronze	Elizabeth Jimie; Leong Mun Yee	Diving	Women's synchronised 3 metre springboard	11
Bronze	Qabil Ambak Mahamad Fathil	Equestrian	Individual dressage	5
Bronze	Husref Malek	Equestrian	Individual eventing	8
Bronze	Lim Yoke Wai	Karate	Men's kumite 65 kg	13
Bronze	Lim Lee Lee	Karate	Women's individual kata	12
Bronze	Yamini Gopalasamy	Karate	Women's kumite 60 kg	13
Bronze	Nurul Elia Anuar	Sailing	Laser 4.7	12
Bronze	Azman Nasruddin; Saiful Nizam Mohd; Saufi Salleh	Sepaktakraw	Men's double regu	13
Bronze	Sharon Wee	Squash	Women's singles	14
Bronze	Diana Bong	Wushu	Women's nanquan	14
Bronze	Ng Shin Yii	Wushu	Women's taijiquan	13

== Archery ==
Men's recurve

Athlete	Event	Qualification		1/16 elimination	1/8 elimination	1/4 elimination	1/2 elimination	Final	Rank
Athlete	Event	Score	Seed	Opposition Score	Opposition Score	Opposition Score	Opposition Score	Opposition Score	Rank
Cheng Chu Sian	Individual	1303	7 Q	Tsogtyn Badamkhatan (MGL); W 100 – 86	Ryuichi Moriya (JPN); W 109 – 97	Kuo Cheng-wei (TPE); L 108 – 114	Did not advance		
Muhammad Marbawi	Individual	1264	20 Q	Ali Ahmed Salem (QAT); W 81^{9} – 81^{5}	Yong Fujun (CHN); L 97 – 99	Did not advance			
Nazrin Aizad	Individual	1145	47	Did not advance					
Wan Khalmizam	Individual	1231	29	Did not advance					
Cheng Chu Sian; Muhammad Marbawi; Nazrin Aizad; Wan Khalmizam	Team	3798	5 Q	—N/a	Mongolia; W 209 – 195	China; W 218 – 215	South Korea; L 216 – 224	India; L 207 – 211	4

Women's recurve

Athlete	Event	Qualification		1/16 elimination	1/8 elimination	1/4 elimination	1/2 elimination	Final	Rank
Athlete	Event	Score	Seed	Opposition Score	Opposition Score	Opposition Score	Opposition Score	Opposition Score	Rank
Anbarasi Subramaniam	Individual	1227	34 Q	Dola Banerjee (IND); L 104 – 112	Did not advance				
Mon Redee Sut Txi	Individual	1180	40	Did not advance					
Noor Aziera Taip	Individual	1195	37	Did not advance					
Siti Sholeha Yusof	Individual	1234	28 Q	Yelena Plotnikova (KAZ); L 98 – 99	Did not advance				
Anbarasi Subramaniam; Mon Redee Sut Txi; Noor Aziera Taip; Siti Sholeha Yusof	Team	3656	11 Q	—N/a	India; L 166 – 197	Did not advance			

== Athletics ==
Roslinda Samsu won a silver in women's pole vault while Noraseela Mohd Khalid earned a bronze in the women's 400 metres hurdles.

Key

- Note – Ranks given for track events are within the athlete's heat only
- Q = Qualified for the next round
- q = Qualified for the next round as a fastest loser or, in field events, by position without achieving the qualifying target
- NR = National record
- N/A = Round not applicable for the event
- Bye = Athlete not required to compete in round

Men
Track event

Athlete	Event	Round 1		Semifinal		Final	
Athlete	Event	Time	Rank	Time	Rank	Time	Rank
Mohd Robani Hassan	110 m hurdles	14.11	8 q	—N/a		14.04	8

Field event

Athlete	Event	Qualification		Final	
Athlete	Event	Distance	Rank	Distance	Rank
Lee Hup Wei	High jump	—N/a		2.15	9

Women
Track event

Athlete	Event	Round 1		Semifinal		Final	
Athlete	Event	Time	Rank	Time	Rank	Time	Rank
Noraseela Mohd Khalid	400 m hurdles	—N/a				56.85	3rd place, bronze medalist(s)

Field events

Athlete	Event	Qualification		Final	
Athlete	Event	Distance	Rank	Distance	Rank
Roslinda Samsu	Pole vault	—N/a		4.30	2nd place, silver medalist(s)
Ngew Sin Mei	Triple jump	—N/a		13.60	4

== Badminton ==
Malaysia's biggest hope, the second seed ranking in the world, Lee Chong Wei is looking forward for at least a gold. However, after losing to the third seed from Korea, Lee Hyun-il by 21-19, 21-19, the Malaysian badminton team 2 men's double were beaten by the Korean team. Malaysia won the bronze medal in the men's team, after losing to South Korea by 3-1.

In the individual section, Lee Chong Wei faced Taufik Hidayat in the semifinals and losing to 21-16, 21-18. Again, he got a bronze medal only. However, Malaysia unseeded men's doubles pair of Koo Kien Kiat and Tan Boon Heong went all the way. After the world no. 1 Chinese pair in the quarterfinal and World Champion Indonesian doubles Kido Markis and Setiawan Hendra, they again beat another Indonesian team in the final, winning a victory gold medal for Malaysia in the men's double. This was Malaysia's 1st gold medal in badminton for 36 years. Malaysia was even unable to progress to the final in Asian games; they lost to Indonesia 12 years ago.

Besides the men's singles and doubles, Malaysia also attained 2 bronze in the men's team event and also the mixed double.

Athlete	Event	Round of 32	Round of 16	Quarterfinal	Semifinal	Final	
Athlete	Event	Opposition Score	Opposition Score	Opposition Score	Opposition Score	Opposition Score	Rank
Lee Chong Wei (2)	Men's singles	Bye	S Sato (JPN); W 21–17, 21–18	B Ponsana (THA); W 20–22, 21–11, 21–7	T Hidayat (INA); L 16–21, 18–21	Did not advance	3rd place, bronze medalist(s)
Muhammad Hafiz Hashim (5)	Men's singles	Bye	E Awad (SYR); W 21–5, 21–6	S Sasaki (JPN); W 21–14, 21–17	Lee H-i (KOR); L 20–22, 6–21	Did not advance	
Koo Kien Keat; Tan Boon Heong	Men's doubles	SH Ebrahim / SJ Ebrahim (BRN); W 21–1, 21–3	Hwang J-m / Lee J-j (KOR); W 21–18, 21–14	Cai Y / Fu HF (CHN); W 21–9, 21–19	M Kido / H Setiawan (INA); W 21–16, 21–13	L Hadiyanto / A Yulianto (INA); W 21–13, 21–14	1st place, gold medalist(s)
Fairuzizuan Tazari; Lin Woon Fui (4)	Men's doubles	Bye	Guo ZD / Zheng B (CHN); L 20–22, 23–25	Did not advance			
Julia Wong	Women's singles	T Murgunde (IND); W W/O	Hwang H-y (KOR); L 16–21, 9–21	Did not advance			
Wong Mew Choo (6)	Women's singles	R Matar (SYR); W 21–5, 21–2	Lee Y-h (KOR); L 12–21, 21–14, 12–21	Did not advance			
Joanne Quay; Lim Pek Siah	Women's doubles	Bye	Gao L / Huang S (CHN); L 8–21, 11–21	Did not advance			
Chin Eei Hui; Wong Pei Tty (7)	Women's doubles	Bye	Ha J-e / Hwang Y-m (KOR); W 21–12, 20–22, 21–12	K Ogura / R Shiota (JPN); L 14–21, 12–21	Did not advance		
Koo Kien Keat; Joanne Quay	Mixed doubles	K Asuncion / K Asuncion (PHI); W 21–13, 21–15	H Wijaya / F Liu (SIN); W 21–9, 21–16	Xie ZB / Zhang YW (CHN); L 9–21, 5–21	Did not advance		
Fairuzizuan Tazari; Wong Pei Tty	Mixed doubles	T Otsuka / S Suetsuna (JPN); W 22–20, 20–22, 24–22	H Saputra / Li YJ (SIN); W 21–19, 21–13	Lee J-j / Lee H-j (KOR); W 22–20, 11–21, 21–13	Zheng B / Gao L (CHN); L 11–21, 13–21	Did not advance	3rd place, bronze medalist(s)

Men's team
Pool C

Team	Pld	W	L	MF	MA
Malaysia	2	2	0	8	1
Japan	2	1	1	5	5
Hong Kong	2	0	2	1	8

30 November	Japan	0–5	Malaysia

Shoji Sato	0–2	Lee Chong Wei	10–21, 18–21
Sho Sasaki	0–2	Mohd Hafiz Hashim	13–21, 13–21
Keita Masuda	0–2	Kuan Beng Hong	12–21, 6–21
Shoji Sato / Sho Sasaki	0–2	Koo Kien Keat / Tan Boon Heong	13–21, 15–21
Keita Masuda / Tadashi Otsuka	0–2	Lin Woon Fui / Fairuzizuan Tazari	19–21, 20–22

2 December	Hong Kong	1–3	Malaysia

Ng Wei	2–1	Mohd Hafiz Hashim	16–21, 21–15, 21–18
Chan Yan Kit	0–2	Kuan Beng Hong	25–27, 19–21
Wong Wai Hong	0–2	Wong Choong Hann	19–21, 15–21
Albertus Susanto Njoto / Yohan Hadikusumo Wiratama	1–2	Lin Woon Fui / Fairuzizuan Tazari	13–21, 21–18, 14–21

Semifinal

4 December	South Korea	3–1	Malaysia

Lee Hyun-il	2–0	Lee Chong Wei	21–19, 21–19
Jung Jae-sung / Lee Yong-dae	2–1	Lin Woon Fui / Fairuzizuan Tazari	19–21, 22–20, 21–16
Park Sung-hwan	1–2	Mohd Hafiz Hashim	12–21, 21–11, 17–21
Lee Jae-jin / Hwang Ji-man	2–0	Koo Kien Keat / Tan Boon Heong	21–14, 23–21

Ranked 3rd in final standings

Women's team
Pool W

Team	Pld	W	L	MF	MA
China	2	2	0	10	0
Indonesia	2	1	1	3	7
Malaysia	2	0	2	2	8

30 November	Malaysia	0–5	China

Wong Mew Choo	1–2	Zhang Ning	21–19, 18–21, 18–21
Chin Eei Hui / Wong Pei Tty	0–2	Gao Ling / Huang Sui	20–22, 17–21
Julia Wong	0–2	Xie Xingfang	5–21, 9–21
Joanne Quay / Lim Pek Siah	0–2	Yang Wei / Zhang Jiewen	10–21, 9–21
Ooi Sock Ai	0–2	Zhu Lin	13–21, 3–21

2 December	Indonesia	3–2	Malaysia

Fransisca Ratnasari	0–2	Wong Mew Choo	13–21, 16–21
Jo Novita / Greysia Polii	1–2	Wong Pei Tty / Chin Eei Hui	21–17, 20–22, retired
Adriyanti Firdasari	2–0	Julia Wong	21–18, 21–15
Liliyana Natsir / Lita Nurlita	2–0	Joanne Quay / Lim Pek Siah	21–9, 21–19
Pia Zebadiah Bernadet	2–0	Norsyahliza Baharum	21–14, 21–13

== Bodybuilding ==
In the 65 kg bodybuilding final, Sazali Samad earned a silver medal.

Men

Athlete	Event	Prejudging round		Final		Total	Rank
Athlete	Event	Result	Rank	Result	Rank	Total	Rank
Sazali Samad	65 kg	8	2 Q	8	2	16	2nd place, silver medalist(s)
Liaw Teck Leong	80 kg	26	4 Q	22	4	48	4

== Bowling ==
Esther Cheah won gold for the tenpin bowling women's singles, with an Asian Games record of 1,444 for a six-game series and an average of 240.7. She became the first Malaysian to win this event.

Holloway Cheah, Cheah's father and Malaysian national coach, who won gold for the men's team of five event at the 1978 Asian Games, said, "I trained her very hard for it. I leave everything with the Lord and I'm very proud for her. I knew that she could make it. It is the best Asian Games that I have attended in my life."

Indonesia's Putty Insavilla Armein won silver, the first ever medal for her country in women's singles at the Asian Games, despite earlier breaking the eight-year-old record with a total of 1,395. Armein paid tribute to Cheah's victory, "I was not disappointed, she did better today. The battle of the day is over. My best today was not good enough to earn the gold. I didn't know I had set a then record, but felt extremely happy that I did that. What I did today is my best performance in this event."

Angkana Netrviseth claimed the bronze medal with a total of 1,331, three pins better than that of Japanese bowler Kanako Ishimine.

Cheah also helped Malaysia win the women's team of five crown with a Games record 6,555 total for a six-game series. She won silver in the all events competition behind Choi Jin A of Korea on Friday 8 December.

The medals took Cheah's personal haul at Doha 2006 to two gold medals and two silver, the 20-year-old having already become the first Malaysian to win the women's singles and then claimed silver in the women's trios.

Cheah and teammates Sharon Koh Suet Len, Wendy Chai De Choo, Zandra Aziela and Shalin Zulkifli at the Qatar Bowling Centre to shatter the previous six-game record of 6,272 – set by Japan in Busan four years ago.

However, this was not the only record the Malaysians claimed on the way to victory, posting new benchmarks for a one-game series and three-game series which had stood at 1,156 and 3,183 respectively.

Malaysia took gold by 239 pins from the Korean quintet of Choi, Hwang Sun Ok, Gang Hye Eun, Kim Yeau Jin and Nam Bo Ra – the latter two having won the gold medal in this event in 2002 – who scored 6,316.

"We are very happy after winning gold today for the team of five. We got second in the last game of trios and after that we set our target for gold only and we have done it [as] this time we beat the team of Korea," Cheah said.

The bronze medal went to Tan Bee Leng, Cherie Tan Shi Hua, Evelyn Chan Lu Ee, Michelle Kwang Tien Mei and Valerie Teo Hui Ying of Singapore with their total of 6,239 being 165 pins better than the Chinese team.

Choi, who led the Korean team by example with the top total of her compatriots, though had cause to smile after pipping Cheah to the all events gold medal with an average of 222.5.

A bowler's totals from the singles, doubles, trios and team of five competitions are added together to determine the all events champion, with Choi's total of 5,339 being not only 43 pins better than that of Cheah, but also a Games record.

This gave Choi her fourth medal of the Games like Cheah, the Korean having also won silver in the doubles and bronze in the trios earlier in the week. Teo also collected her third medal with the bronze on 5,245, the Singaporean having also won the doubles with Kwang.

Singles

Player	Event	Total	Final rank
Aaron Kong Eng Chuan	Men's singles	1221	54
Alex Liew Kien Liang	Men's singles	1270	26
Azidi Ameran	Men's singles	1260	30
Ben Heng Boon Hian	Men's singles	1265	27
Daniel Lim Tow Chuang	Men's singles	1241	42
Zulmazran Zulkifli	Men's singles	1297	18
Crystal Choy Poh Lai	Women's singles	1233	21
Esther Cheah Mei Lan	Women's singles	1444 GR	1st place, gold medalist(s)
Shalin Zulkifli	Women's singles	1190	33
Sharon Koh Suet Lan	Women's singles	1275	14
Wendy Chai De Choo	Women's singles	1184	35
Zandra Aziela Ibrahim	Women's singles	1291	9

Doubles

Player	Event	Total	Final rank
Aaron Kong Eng Chuan; Azidi Ameran	Men's doubles	2678	11
Alex Liew Kien Liang; Ben Heng Boon Hian	Men's doubles	2678	11
Daniel Lim Tow Chuang; Zulmazran Zulkifli	Men's doubles	2619	16
Esther Cheah Mei Lan; Shalin Zulkifli	Women's doubles	2533	8
Crystal Choy Poh Lai; Wendy Chai De Choo	Women's doubles	2409	14
Sharon Koh Suet Lan; Zandra Aziela Ibrahim	Women's doubles	2361	20

Trios

Player	Event	Total	Final rank
Aaron Kong Eng Chuan; Ben Heng Boon Hian; Daniel Lim Tow Chuang	Men's trios	4089 GR	1st place, gold medalist(s)
Alex Liew Kien Liang; Azidi Ameran; Zulmazran Zulkifli	Men's trios	3852	4
Crystal Choy Poh Lai; Sharon Koh Suet Lan; Wendy Chai De Choo	Women's trios	3462	12
Esther Cheah Mei Lan; Shalin Zulkifli; Zandra Aziela Ibrahim	Women's trios	3973	2nd place, silver medalist(s)

Team

Player	Event	Total	Final rank
Aaron Kong Eng Chuan; Alex Liew Kien Liang; Azidi Ameran; Ben Heng Boon Hian; Daniel Lim Tow Chuang; Zulmazran Zulkifli	Men's team	6332	5
Crystal Choy Poh Lai; Esther Cheah Mei Lan; Shalin Zulkifli; Sharon Koh Suet Lan; Wendy Chai De Choo; Zandra Aziela Ibrahim	Women's team	6555 GR	1st place, gold medalist(s)

All-events

Player	Event	Final					Final rank
Player	Event	Singles	Doubles	Trios	Team	Total	Final rank
Aaron Kong Eng Chuan	Men's all-events	1221	1307	1392	1348	5268	8
Alex Liew Kien Liang	Men's all-events	1270	1392	1315	1252	5229	12
Azidi Ameran	Men's all-events	1260	1371	1266	1239	5136	26
Ben Heng Boon Hian	Men's all-events	1265	1286	1374	1287	5212	14
Daniel Lim Tow Chuang	Men's all-events	1241	1355	1323	1293	5212	14
Zulmazran Zulkifli	Men's all-events	1297	1264	1271	1205	5037	38
Crystal Choy Poh Lai	Women's all-events	1233	1186	1145	1147	4711	40
Esther Cheah Mei Lan	Women's all-events	1444	1253	1299	1300	5296	2nd place, silver medalist(s)
Shalin Zulkifli	Women's all-events	1190	1280	1371	1337	5178	5
Sharon Koh Suet Lan	Women's all-events	1275	1163	1098	1235	4771	33
Wendy Chai De Choo	Women's all-events	1184	1223	1219	1362	4988	19
Zandra Aziela Ibrahim	Women's all-events	1291	1198	1303	1321	5113	11

Masters

Player	Event	Preliminary		Stepladder finals	
Player	Event	Score	Rank	Score	Final rank
Aaron Kong Eng Chuan	Men's masters	3391	15	Did not advance	
Alex Liew Kien Liang	Men's masters	3661	5	Did not advance	
Esther Cheah Mei Lan	Women's masters	3572	3 Q	2nd – 3rd placement match Kim Yeau-jin (KOR); W 215–212; Gold medal match Choi Jin-a (KOR); L 397–482	2nd place, silver medalist(s)
Shalin Zulkifli	Women's masters	3465	6	Did not advance	

== Boxing ==
Three boxers represented Malaysia and competed for 11 gold medals at stake in this edition of the Asiad. The country garnered three bronze medals in boxing at the 2005 Southeast Asian Games in the Philippines. The Busan 2002 Asian Games powerhouse countries include: Uzbekistan, South Korea, Kazakhstan, Pakistan and Thailand.

Athlete	Event	Round of 32	Round of 16	Quarterfinal	Semifinal	Final	
Athlete	Event	Opposition Score	Opposition Score	Opposition Score	Opposition Score	Opposition Score	Rank
Zamzai Azizi Mohamad	Men's light flyweight (48 kg)	Bye	Godfrey Castro (PHI); L 6–26 RSCO	Did not advance			
Eddey Kalai	Men's featherweight (57 kg)	Bye	Bahodirjon Sultonov (UZB); L 4–14 RSCO	Did not advance			
Paunandes Paulus	Men's lightweight (60 kg)	Bye	Hu Qing (CHN); L 10–29	Did not advance			

== Cue sports ==
Esther Kwan Suet Yee earned a silver in women 9 ball pool-singles.

Men

Athlete	Event	Round of 64	Round of 32	Round of 16	Quarterfinals	Semifinals	Final	Rank
Athlete	Event	Opposition Score	Opposition Score	Opposition Score	Opposition Score	Opposition Score	Opposition Score	Rank
Ibrahim Amir	Eight-ball singles	Bye	Bayasgalangiin Enkh-Amgalan (MGL); W 9 - 2	Wu Jia-qing (TPE); W 9 - 8	Satoshi Kawabata (JPN); L 3 - 9	Did not advance		
Patrick Ooi	Eight-ball singles	Bye	Nguyễn Anh Tuấn (VIE); W 9 - 6	Huang Kun-chang (TPE); L 7 - 9	Did not advance			
Ibrahim Amir	Nine-ball singles	Bye	Bashar Hussein (QAT); W 11 - 9	Antonio Gabica (PHI); L 5 - 11	Did not advance			
Patrick Ooi	Nine-ball singles	Bye	Yukio Akagariyama (JPN); L 9 - 11	Did not advance				
Moh Keen Hoo	Snooker singles	Ahmed Aseeri (KSA); W 4 - 0	Shokat Ali (PAK); W 4 - 1	Mohammed Shehab (UAE); L 2 - 4	Did not advance			
Thor Chuan Leong	Snooker singles	Saleh Mohammad (AFG); L 1 - 4	Did not advance					
Lai Chee Wei; Moh Keen Hoo	Snooker doubles	—N/a	Keith E. Boon; Peter Gilchrist (SIN); W W/O	Đỗ Hoàng Quân; Lương Chí Dũng (VIE); W 3 - 1	Naveen Perwani; Muhammad Yousaf (PAK); W 3 - 1	Chan Wai Ki; Marco Fu (HKG); L 0 - 3	Bronze medal match Atthasit Mahitthi; Phaithoon Phonbun (THA); L 1 - 3	4
Lai Chee Wei; Moh Keen Hoo; Thor Chuan Leong (4)	Snooker team	—N/a	Bye	Mongolia; W 3 - 0	Qatar; W 3 - 1	Hong Kong; L 1 - 3	Bronze medal match India; L 0 - 3	4

Women

Athlete	Event	Round of 32	Round of 16	Quarterfinals	Semifinals	Final	Rank
Athlete	Event	Opposition Score	Opposition Score	Opposition Score	Opposition Score	Opposition Score	Rank
Esther Kwan Suet Yee	Eight-ball singles	Bye	Liu Shin-mei (TPE); L 2 - 7	Did not advance			
Suhana Dewi Sabtu	Eight-ball singles	Bye	Cha Yu-ram (KOR); L 5 - 7	Did not advance			
Esther Kwan Suet Yee	Nine-ball singles	Bye	Amy Hoe (SIN); W 7 - 5	Meenal Thakur (IND); W 7 - 2	Iris Ranola (PHI); W 7 - 4	Liu Shin-mei (TPE); L 3 - 7	2nd place, silver medalist(s)
Suhana Dewi Sabtu	Nine-ball singles	Bye	Cha Yu-ram (KOR); W 7 - 4	Liu Shin-mei (TPE); L 2 - 7	Did not advance		

== Cycling ==
=== Road ===
Athletes	Event	Time	Rank
Shahrulneeza Razali	Men's individual road race	Did not finish	
Suhardi Hassan	Men's individual road race	4:10:54	25
Shahrulneeza Razali	Men's individual time trial	1:05:01.08	15
Amir Mustafa Rusli; Mohammad Akmal Amrun; Mohd Jasmin Ruslan; Shahrulneeza Razali	Men's team time trial	1:37:29.08	13
Noor Azian Alias	Women's individual road race	3:07:38	11
Uracca Leow Hoay Sim	Women's individual road race	3:07:38	13
Uracca Leow Hoay Sim	Women's individual time trial	Did not start	

=== Track ===
Sprint

Athlete	Event	Qualifying		1/8 final	Quarterfinal	Semifinal	Final	
Athlete	Event	Time	Rank	Opposition Time	Opposition Time	Opposition Time	Opposition Time	Rank
Josiah Ng	Men's sprint	10.537 GR	1 Q	Farkad Jassim (IRQ); W	Jeon Yeong-gyu (KOR); W 11.171, W 11.126	Tsubasa Kitatsuru (JPN); W 11.362, L, L	Bronze medal match Tang Qi (CHN); L, L	4
Mohd Rizal Tisin	Men's sprint	10.684	6 Q	Jan Paul Morales (PHI); W	Tang Qi (CHN); L, L	Bye	5th – 8th classification Kazunari Watanabe (JPN); Wang Qiming (CHN); Jeon Yeong-gyu (KOR); L	6
Josiah Ng; Junaidi Mohamad Nasir; Mohd Rizal Tisin	Men's team sprint	46.829	4 q	—N/a			Bronze medal match South Korea (KOR); Choi Lae-seon; Kang Dong-jin; Yang Hee-chun; L 46.455	4

Pursuit

Athlete	Event	Qualifying		Final	
Athlete	Event	Time	Rank	Opposition Time	Rank
Amir Mustafa Rusli	Men's individual pursuit	4:48.484	15	Did not advance	
Thum Weng Kin	Men's individual pursuit	Disqualified		Did not advance	
Amir Mustafa Rusli; Mohamed Harrif Salleh; Mohammad Akmal Amrun; Thum Weng Kin	Men's team pursuit	4:23.974	5	Did not advance	
Uracca Leow Hoay Sim	Women's individual pursuit	3:50.146	3 Q	3:50.891	4

Time trial

Athlete	Event	Time Speed (km/h)	Rank
Mohamad Hafiz Sufian	Men's 1 km time trial	1:06.667	5

Points race

Athlete	Event	Qualification		Final	
Athlete	Event	Points	Rank	Points	Rank
Mohamed Harrif Salleh	Men's points race	8	13 Q	Did not finish	
Mohd Jasmin Ruslan	Men's points race	5	10 Q	-16	11
Noor Azian Alias	Women's points race	—N/a		7	5
Uracca Leow Hoay Sim	Women's points race	—N/a		2	13

Keirin

Athlete	Event	Round 1		Repechage 1		Round 2		Final	
Athlete	Event	Time	Rank	Time	Rank	Time	Rank	Time	Rank
Josiah Ng	Men's keirin	Yang Hee-chun (KOR); Wang Qiming (CHN); Keita Ebine (JPN); Jan Paul Morales (PHI); Lin Kun-hung (TPE); W	1 Q	Bye		Yang Hee-chun (KOR); Mahmoud Parash (IRI); Gao Yahui (CHN); Liao Kuo-lung (TPE); Mohamed Husain (IRI); W	1 Q	1st – 6th classification Kang Dong-jin (KOR); Hiroyuki Inagaki (JPN); Yang Hee-chun (KOR); Wang Qiming (CHN); Mahmoud Parash (IRI); L	2nd place, silver medalist(s)
Mohd Rizal Tisin	Men's keirin	Kang Dong-jin (KOR); Mahmoud Parash (IRI); Badr Ali Shambih (UAE); Edi Purnomo (INA); Mohamed Husain (BRN); L	3 R	Farshid Farsinejadian (IRI); Mohamed Husain (BRN); Gao Yahui (CHN); Keita Ebine (JPN); Jan Paul Morales (PHI); L	4 Q	Hiroyuki Inagaki (JPN); Kang Dong-jin (KOR); Wang Qiming (CHN); Farshid Farsinejadian (IRI); Lin Kun-hung (TPE); L	5	7th – 12th classification Gao Yahui (CHN); Liao Kuo-lung (TPE); Farshid Farsinejadian (IRI); Lin Kun-hung (TPE); Mohamed Husain (BRN); L	9

== Diving ==
Malaysian diver Elizabeth Jimie may only be 14 years old and have just two international appearances to her name, but she will be among the contenders to land a medal at the 15th Asian Games Doha 2006.

Jimie is already a world champion after her victory on home soil in the Group B (14–15 years old) 1 m springboard event at the 16th World Youth Championships in Kuala Lumpur in August.

Jimie beat two Chinese divers to take that gold at the Federation Internationale de Natation (FINA) event, and become the first Malaysian female diver to win a world title – only a month after making her debut on the international stage at the World Cup in Changshu, China.

However Jimie, who comes from a family of four siblings in Kuching, is no stranger to the Malaysian scene. She was first drafted into the national squad as an 11-year-old, only to suffer from homesickness and return home to the state of Sarawak.

“I will be partnering Leong Mun Yee for the 3m synchronised event,” Jimie told The Star newspaper. “I will also compete in the 1m and 3m springboard individual events.

“It will be great to reach the final, but I want to concentrate on improving my diving skills.”

Malaysia has high hopes for her with Edwin Chong, the Amateur Swimming Union of Malaysia (ASUM) Secretary, admitting that “it is not beyond her abilities to win an Asian Games medal, especially in the 3m synchronised event”.

As a result, in the women's 3 m synchronised event held on 11 December, Malaysia team of Edwin Chong and Elizabeth Jimie won a bronze medal with a total point of 275.04 points, 50.40 points behind the gold medalist (the China diving team).

The next day, again Elizabeth Jimie got another bronze medal in the Women's 1 m Springboard Final, with 280.30 points. The other two Chinese girls got a gold and a silver. Another Malaysian, Leong Mun Yee, got 4th place in the game.

In the men's synchro 3 m springboard final, Malaysian representative of Roslan Rossharisham and Yeoh Ken Nee get a total result of 393.36, 55.14 points behind the china gold medallist and got another silver medal for Malaysia.

Yeoh Ken Nee, as Malaysia another medal prospect in the Men's 1m Springboard Final event, got a 4th place, with a difference of 19.35 points behind Japan's Terauchi Ken. Earlier in the preliminary round, Yeoh get a 3rd place, only slightly behind China's Luo and Qin.

Men

Athlete	Event	Preliminary		Final	
Athlete	Event	Score	Rank	Score	Rank
Khairul Safwan Mansur	1 m springboard	338.30	5 Q	344.45	6
Yeoh Ken Nee	1 m springboard	320.60	9 Q	400.40	4
Khairul Safwan Mansur	3 m springboard	398.85	6 Q	411.20	7
Yeoh Ken Nee	3 m springboard	403.55	4 Q	431.55	4
Bryan Nickson Lomas	10 m platform	376.95	7 Q	394.20	9
Bryan Nickson Lomas; Rossharisham Roslan	3 m synchronised springboard	—N/a		393.36	2nd place, silver medalist(s)

Women

Athlete	Event	Preliminary		Final	
Athlete	Event	Score	Rank	Score	Rank
Elizabeth Jimie	1 m springboard	—N/a		280.30	3rd place, bronze medalist(s)
Leong Mun Yee	1 m springboard	—N/a		262.25	4
Elizabeth Jimie	3 m springboard	274.50	6 Q	253.20	7
Leong Mun Yee	3 m springboard	303.70	3 Q	307.80	3rd place, bronze medalist(s)
Elizabeth Jimie; Leong Mun Yee	3 m synchronised springboard	—N/a		275.04	3rd place, bronze medalist(s)

== Equestrian ==
A bronze each from dressage - individual and Eventing - Individual, while a silver from dressage - Team.

Dressage

Athlete	Horse	Event	Grand Prix Qualifier		Final							Rank
Athlete	Horse	Event	Grand Prix Qualifier		GPS		Total score (GP + GPS)		GPF		Total score (GP + GPS + GPF)	Rank
Athlete	Horse	Event	% Score	Rank	% Score	Rank	% Score	Rank	% Score	Rank	Total score (GP + GPS + GPF)	Rank
Diani Lee Cheng	Antschar	Individual dressage	60.833	15	Did not advance							20
Nur Quzandria Mahamad Fathil	Havel	Individual dressage	65.278	5 Q	62.889	9	64.083	6 Q	60.500	12	62.889	8
Putri Alia Soraya	Chagall Junior	Individual dressage	61.389	14	Did not advance							19
Qabil Ambak Mahamad Fathil	Charming 8	Individual dressage	66.000	3 Q	66.222	3	66.111	3 Q	68.900	2	67.041	3rd place, bronze medalist(s)
Diani Lee Cheng; Nur Quzandria Mahamad Fathil; Putri Alia Soraya; Qabil Ambak Mahamad Fathil	Antschar; Havel; Chagall Junior; Charming 8;	Team dressage	—N/a								64.222	2nd place, silver medalist(s)

Endurance

Athlete	Horse	Event	Time	Rank
Rahman Azman	Colorado	Individual endurance	EL	

Eventing

Athlete	Horse	Event	Dressage	Cross-country			Jumping			Total score	Rank
Athlete	Horse	Event	Dressage	Jump	Time	Total	Jump	Time	Total	Total score	Rank
Amir Zulkefle	Aachen	Individual eventing	68.10	80	28.80	108.80	12	0.00	12.00	188.90	25
Husref Malek	Dashper	Individual eventing	53.30	0	0.00	0	4	0.00	4.00	57.30	3rd place, bronze medalist(s)
Johari Lee	Star Portrait	Individual eventing	61.70	0	0.00	0	0	0.00	0.00	61.70	5
Amir Zulkefle; Husref Malek; Johari Lee	Aachen	Team eventing	183.10	108.80			16.00			307.90	6

Jumping

Athlete	Horse	Event	Qualifier						Final					
Athlete	Horse	Event	First		Second		Total		Round A		Round B		Total score (A + B)	
Athlete	Horse	Event	Pen.	Rank	Pen.	Rank	Pen.	Rank	Pen.	Rank	Pen.	Rank	Pen.	Rank
Alex Maurer	Tandonia	Individual jumping	4	6 Q	20	43	24	39	Did not advance					
Qabil Ambak Mahamad Fathil	Parvina	Individual jumping	12	30 Q	4	18	16	26 Q	0	1 Q	14	12	14	9
Quzier Ambak Mahamad Fathil	Calano	Individual jumping	12	30 Q	8	30	20	34	Did not advance					
Syed Omar Al-Mohdzar	Lui 24	Individual jumping	4	6 Q	8	30	12	20 Q	0	1 Q	9	8	9	4
Alex Maurer; Qabil Ambak Mahamad Fathil; Quzier Ambak Mahamad Fathil; Syed Omar Al-Mohdzar	Tandonia; Parvina; Calano; Lui 24;	Team jumping	—N/a						20	5 Q	20	9	40	9

== Field hockey ==
=== Men's tournament ===
The Malaysian men team shared the same group with Pakistan, Japan, Hong Kong and Chinese Taipei.

Squad list	Preliminary league		Rank	Semifinal	Final	Rank
Amin Rahim; Azlan Misron; Chua Boon Huat; Jivan Mohan; Jiwa Mohan; Kuhan Shanmuganathan; Kumar Subramaniam; Madzli Ikmar; Megat Azrafiq Termizi; Nor Azlan Bakar; Razie Rahim; Roslan Jamaluddin; Sallehin Abdul Ghani; Shahrun Nabil; Sukri Mutalib; Tengku Ahmad Tajuddin	Pakistan; D 1–1; Kuhan 52'; Zubair 69'	Hong Kong; W 2–1; Kuhan 21'; Jiw. Mohan 29'; Ar. Ali 13'	3 Q	Bangladesh; W 6–1; Jiw. Mohan 5', 34'; Chua Boon Huat 9'; A. Rahim 24', 47'; R. Rahim 30'; Alam 16'	5th/6th classification India; L 0–4; Raghunath 13', 61'; R. Singh 41'; G. Singh 64'	6
Amin Rahim; Azlan Misron; Chua Boon Huat; Jivan Mohan; Jiwa Mohan; Kuhan Shanmuganathan; Kumar Subramaniam; Madzli Ikmar; Megat Azrafiq Termizi; Nor Azlan Bakar; Razie Rahim; Roslan Jamaluddin; Sallehin Abdul Ghani; Shahrun Nabil; Sukri Mutalib; Tengku Ahmad Tajuddin	Japan; D 2–2; Chua Boon Huat 32'; Nabil 47'; Yamabori 9', 43'	Chinese Taipei; W 9–0; A. Rahim 4', 29', 33'; Chua Boon Huat 5', 58'; Tajuddin 17', 42'; R. Rahim 46', 66'	3 Q	Bangladesh; W 6–1; Jiw. Mohan 5', 34'; Chua Boon Huat 9'; A. Rahim 24', 47'; R. Rahim 30'; Alam 16'	5th/6th classification India; L 0–4; Raghunath 13', 61'; R. Singh 41'; G. Singh 64'	6

=== Women's tournament ===
Squad list	Preliminary league		Rank	Final	Rank
Intan Nurairah Khusaini; Sebah Kari; Noor Hasliza Md Ali; Siti Noor Amarina Ruhaini; Juliani Mohamad Din; Norfaraha Hashim; Siti Rahmah Othman; Nurul Nadia Mokhtar; Chitra Devi Arumugam; Kannagi Arumugam; Nadia Abdul Rahman; Norbaini Hashim; Ernawati Mahmud; Catherine Lambor; Siti Sarah Nurfarahah; Fauziah Mizan	Japan; L 0–7; Chiba 5', 9', 39'; Iwao 18'; Ozawa 33', 54'; Tsukui 60'	Chinese Taipei; W 2–0; Abdul Rahman 8'; Ruhaini 39'	5	Fifth and sixth place classification Thailand; W 5–0; Khusaini 4'; Othman 22', 32'; Chitra Devi 28'; Abdul Rahman 57'	5
Intan Nurairah Khusaini; Sebah Kari; Noor Hasliza Md Ali; Siti Noor Amarina Ruhaini; Juliani Mohamad Din; Norfaraha Hashim; Siti Rahmah Othman; Nurul Nadia Mokhtar; Chitra Devi Arumugam; Kannagi Arumugam; Nadia Abdul Rahman; Norbaini Hashim; Ernawati Mahmud; Catherine Lambor; Siti Sarah Nurfarahah; Fauziah Mizan	Hong Kong; W 3–1; Kannagi 5'; Othman 40', 65'; O. Chiu 19'	South Korea; L 0–4; Kim Mi-seon 2'; Park Mi-hyun 27'; Kang Na-young 34'; Choi Eun-young 55'	5	Fifth and sixth place classification Thailand; W 5–0; Khusaini 4'; Othman 22', 32'; Chitra Devi 28'; Abdul Rahman 57'	5
Intan Nurairah Khusaini; Sebah Kari; Noor Hasliza Md Ali; Siti Noor Amarina Ruhaini; Juliani Mohamad Din; Norfaraha Hashim; Siti Rahmah Othman; Nurul Nadia Mokhtar; Chitra Devi Arumugam; Kannagi Arumugam; Nadia Abdul Rahman; Norbaini Hashim; Ernawati Mahmud; Catherine Lambor; Siti Sarah Nurfarahah; Fauziah Mizan	India; L 2–4; Kannagi 9'; Abdul Rahman 54'; Lakra 3'; Toppo 24'; Karim 29'; Kharab 68'	China; L 1–4; Ren Ye 14'; Ma Yibo 32', 53'; Tang Chunling 45'; Mokhtar 45'	5	Fifth and sixth place classification Thailand; W 5–0; Khusaini 4'; Othman 22', 32'; Chitra Devi 28'; Abdul Rahman 57'	5

== Football ==
=== Men's tournament ===
Squad list	Round 1	Round 2		Quarterfinal	Semifinal	Final	Rank
Squad list	Round 1	Group E	Rank	Quarterfinal	Semifinal	Final	Rank
Syed Adney Syed Hussein; Mohd Nor Farhan Muhammad; Ahmad Azlan Zainal; Subramaniam Sooryapparad; Mohd Iqbal Suhaimi; Mohammad Hardi Jaafar; Thirumurugan Veeran; Mohd Fadzli Shaari; Ronny Harun; Rudie Ramli; Es Lizuan Zahid Amir; Mohd Norhafiz Zamani Misbah; Azi Shahril Azmi; Wan Zaman Wan Mustapha; Mohd Norizam Salaman; Azlan Ismail; Samransak Kram; Norshahrul Idlan Talaha; Mohd Saufi Ibrahim; Mohd Sharbinee Allawee Ramli	Bye	Oman; L 1 – 3 Jaafar 62'; Nor Farhan 40' (o.g.); I. Al-Gheilani 57'; Al-Maimani 90+1'	4	Did not advance			
Syed Adney Syed Hussein; Mohd Nor Farhan Muhammad; Ahmad Azlan Zainal; Subramaniam Sooryapparad; Mohd Iqbal Suhaimi; Mohammad Hardi Jaafar; Thirumurugan Veeran; Mohd Fadzli Shaari; Ronny Harun; Rudie Ramli; Es Lizuan Zahid Amir; Mohd Norhafiz Zamani Misbah; Azi Shahril Azmi; Wan Zaman Wan Mustapha; Mohd Norizam Salaman; Azlan Ismail; Samransak Kram; Norshahrul Idlan Talaha; Mohd Saufi Ibrahim; Mohd Sharbinee Allawee Ramli	Bye	China; L 1 – 3 Jaafar 66'; Zhou Haibin 41'; Gao Lin 52'; Feng Xiaoting 72'	4	Did not advance			
Syed Adney Syed Hussein; Mohd Nor Farhan Muhammad; Ahmad Azlan Zainal; Subramaniam Sooryapparad; Mohd Iqbal Suhaimi; Mohammad Hardi Jaafar; Thirumurugan Veeran; Mohd Fadzli Shaari; Ronny Harun; Rudie Ramli; Es Lizuan Zahid Amir; Mohd Norhafiz Zamani Misbah; Azi Shahril Azmi; Wan Zaman Wan Mustapha; Mohd Norizam Salaman; Azlan Ismail; Samransak Kram; Norshahrul Idlan Talaha; Mohd Saufi Ibrahim; Mohd Sharbinee Allawee Ramli	Bye	Iraq; L 0 – 4 Rehema 14'; Mahmoud 54', 55'; Karim 65'	4	Did not advance			

== Golf ==
Men

Athlete	Event	Round 1	Round 2	Round 3	Round 4	Total Score	Par	Final rank
Athlete	Event	Score	Score	Score	Score	Total Score	Par	Final rank
Ben Leong	Individual	69	70	74	71	284	-4	9
Edmund Au	Individual	72	75	75	78	300	+12	39
Shukree Othman	Individual	73	73	77	73	296	+8	31
Siva Chandhran Supramaniam	Individual	72	71	73	75	291	+3	21
Ben Leong; Edmund Au; Shukree Othman; Siva Chandhran Supramaniam	Team	213	214	222	219	868	+4	7

== Gymnastics ==
=== Artistic ===
Ng Shu Wai had won a silver in men's vault.

Men

Athlete	Event								
Athlete	Event	F Rank	PH Rank	R Rank	V Rank	PB Rank	HB Rank	Total	Rank
Ng Shu Mun	Qualification	13.900; 29	13.050; 38	13.100; 39	15.350; 38	14.150; 30	14.250; 27	83.800	19 Q
Ng Shu Wai	Qualification	13.200; 42	14.250; 25	13.950; 29	16.600; 3 Q	14.900; 23	14.900; 17	87.800	14 Q
Ooi Wei Siang	Qualification	12.850; 53	13.000; 41	13.650; 32	15.800; 20	11.650; 66	14.300; 25	81.250	27
Yap Kiam Bun	Qualification	13.650; 34	15.000; 15	12.350; 51	15.000; 42	14.000; 34	13.150; 39	83.150	20
Ng Shu Mun; Ng Shu Wai; Ooi Wei Siang; Yap Kiam Bun	Team all-around	53.600; 8	55.300; 7	53.050; 10	62.750; 6	54.700; 10	56.600; 6	336.000	7
Ng Shu Mun	Individual all-around	14.300; 10	13.250; 17	13.450; 15	15.700; 7	14.000; 13	13.900; 12	84.600	11
Ng Shu Wai	Individual all-around	Did not start						0.000	24
Ng Shu Wai	Vault	—N/a			16.487; 2	—N/a		16.487	2nd place, silver medalist(s)

Women

Athlete	Event	VT Rank	UB Rank	BB Rank	FX Rank	Total	Rank
Nurul Fatiha Abdul Hamid	Qualification	11.900; 30	12.050; 23	11.900; 28	11.850; 25	47.700	18 Q
Nurul Fatiha Abdul Hamid	Individual all-around	13.800; 14	12.250; 9	12.400; 11	12.700; 11	51.050	11

=== Rhythmic ===
Women

Athlete	Event	Qualification						Final					
Athlete	Event	Rope Rank	Hoop Rank	Ball Rank	Clubs Rank	Total	Rank	Rope Rank	Hoop Rank	Ball Rank	Clubs Rank	Total	Rank
Chrystal Lim Wen Chean	Individual all-around	14.125; 6	13.700; 15	14.050; 9	13.600; 9	41.875	8 Q	14.200; 7	14.225; 7	13.675; 10	13.000; 10	55.100	8
Foong Seow Ting	Individual all-around	13.600; 13	13.725; 14	13.925; 11	13.800; 8	41.450	11 Q	13.600; 11	13.600; 14	13.850; 7	13.075; 9	54.125	10
Jaime Lee	Individual all-around	13.175; 18	12.250; 24	12.850; 22	12.475; 18	38.500	24	Did not advance					

== Karate ==
The Karate event had begun on 12 December, but on the 1st day, Malaysia had already won 5 medals, including 4 silver and a bronze. Ramasamy Puvaneswaran, Lakanathan Kunasilan, Ku Jin Keat and Anthony Vasantha Marial won a silver in Men's Kumite -55 kg, Men's Kumite -60 kg, Men's individual Kata and Women's Kumite -48 kg events respectively, while Lim Lee Lee won a bronze in the Women's individual Kata event.

Men

Athlete	Event	1/16 final	1/8 final	Quarterfinal	Semifinal	Final	Rank
Athlete	Event	Opposition Score	Opposition Score	Opposition Score	Opposition Score	Opposition Score	Rank
Ku Jin Keat	Individual kata	—N/a	Enkhbatyn Enkhjin (MGL); W 5–0	Ghulam Ali (PAK); W 5–0	Shen Chia-hao (TPE); W 3–2	Gold medal match Tetsuya Furukawa (JPN); L 0–5	2nd place, silver medalist(s)
Puvaneswaran Ramasamy	Kumite 55 kg	—N/a	Phạm Trần Nguyên (VIE); W 4–3	Eddie Jofriani Johari (BRU); W 4–3	Bambang Maulidin (INA); W 8–0	Gold medal match Hsieh Cheng-kang (TPE); L 2–3	2nd place, silver medalist(s)
Kunasilan Lakanathan	Kumite 60 kg	Bye	Deepak Shrestha (NEP); W 5–4	Park Sang-ho (KOR); W 10–1	Huang Hsiang-chen (TPE); W 5–1	Gold medal match Hossein Rouhani (IRI); L 3–4	2nd place, silver medalist(s)
Lim Yoke Wai	Kumite 65 kg	Meshal Al-Handal (KUW); W 3–2	Ali Al-Shamrani (KSA); W 3–1	Nelson Pacalso (PHI); W 7–1	Hassan Rouhani (IRI); L 2–2	Bronze medal match Rinat Kutuev (UZB); W 5–1	3rd place, bronze medalist(s)
Mahendran Supremaniam	Kumite 70 kg	Bye	Asem Abu-Jamous (JOR); W 3–2	Takuro Nihei (JPN); L 2–3	Did not advance		

Women

Athlete	Event	1/16 final	1/8 final	Quarterfinal	Semifinal	Final	Rank
Athlete	Event	Opposition Score	Opposition Score	Opposition Score	Opposition Score	Opposition Score	Rank
Lim Lee Lee	Individual kata	—N/a	Gantömöriin Erdenechimeg (MGL); W 5–0	Nao Morooka (JPN); L 0–5	Repechage 1 Nour Al-Atari (JOR); W 5–0	Bronze medal match Huang Yu-chi (TPE); W 5–0	3rd place, bronze medalist(s)
Vasantha Marial Anthony	Kumite 48 kg	—N/a	Hiba Harmoush (UAE); W 4–1	Kou Man I (MAC); W 5–1	Chen Yen-hui (TPE); W 7–4	Gold medal match Vũ Thị Nguyệt Ánh (VIE); L 1–6	2nd place, silver medalist(s)
Lim Lee Lee	Kumite 53 kg	—N/a	Gantömöriin Erdenechimeg (MGL); W 3–0	Nour Al-Atari (JOR); W 4–2	Marna Pabillore (PHI); L 1–3	Bronze medal match Venera Zhetibay (KAZ); L 3–9	4
Yamini Gopalasamy	Kumite 60 kg	—N/a	Souzan Amer (SYR); W 8–0	Yuka Sato (JPN); L 1–9	Did not advance	Bronze medal match Yanisa Torrattanawathana (THA); W 4–3	3rd place, bronze medalist(s)

== Sailing ==
Unexpectedly, 15 years old Rufina Tan Hong Mui, who took part in the women's optimist event, won a gold for her country, winning the 1st medal in the sailing events of Malaysia, as well as the 1st gold medal in the Asian games since 1994. She had 30 points in total, 12 points higher than the silver winning Japanese competitor, Komiya Haruka.

In the Laser 4.7 Open, Malaysia's Nurul Elia Anuar also won a bronze with 47 points in total after 12 races.

Men

Athlete	Event	Race												Net points	Rank
Athlete	Event	1	2	3	4	5	6	7	8	9	10	11	12	Net points	Rank
Faizani Yahya	Dinghy Optimist	1	6	3	6	5	~~8~~	5	5	3	6	2	4	46	4
Kevin Lim	Laser	~~12~~; OCS	12; DNF	1	3	4	4	7	5	1	1	2	1	41	4
Hazwan Hazim Dermawan; Lim Chern Wei	Double Handed Dinghy 420	2	~~7~~	6	6	7	3	5	6	4	4	1	5	49	5

Women

Athlete	Event	Race												Net points	Rank
Athlete	Event	1	2	3	4	5	6	7	8	9	10	11	12	Net points	Rank
Rufina Tan Hong Mui	Dinghy Optimist	3	2	2	4	2	3	1	1	1	2	3	~~6~~	24	1st place, gold medalist(s)

Open

Athlete	Event	Race												Net points	Rank
Athlete	Event	1	2	3	4	5	6	7	8	9	10	11	12	Net points	Rank
Nurul Elia Anuar	Laser 4.7	6	~~9~~; OCS	3	7	2	1	2	1	4	2	5	5	38	3rd place, bronze medalist(s)
Mohd Romzi Muhamad	Laser Radial	6	1	1	2	3	4	2	~~12~~; OCS	1	5	4	5	34	4

== Sepaktakraw ==
In men's regu and men's team, Malaysian team went into final and lost to the Thailand teams, winning two silver for Malaysia. However, in the men's double, Malaysia was defeated by Myanmar and only manage to get a bronze.

Men

Squad list	Event	Preliminary		Semifinal	Final	Rank
Squad list	Event	Opposition Score	Rank	Opposition Score	Opposition Score	Rank
Azman Nasruddin; Saiful Nizam Mohd; Saufi Salleh	Double regu	Thailand; L 15-21, 16-21	2 Q	Myanmar; L 16-21, 25-23, 12-15	Did not advance	3rd place, bronze medalist(s)
Azman Nasruddin; Saiful Nizam Mohd; Saufi Salleh	Double regu	India; W 21-7, 21-15	2 Q	Myanmar; L 16-21, 25-23, 12-15	Did not advance	3rd place, bronze medalist(s)
Azman Nasruddin; Saiful Nizam Mohd; Saufi Salleh	Double regu	South Korea; W 21-14, 14-21, 15-11	2 Q	Myanmar; L 16-21, 25-23, 12-15	Did not advance	3rd place, bronze medalist(s)
Azman Nasruddin; Saiful Nizam Mohd; Saufi Salleh	Double regu	Philippines; W 21-14, 21-18	2 Q	Myanmar; L 16-21, 25-23, 12-15	Did not advance	3rd place, bronze medalist(s)
Azlan Mubin; Mohd Normanizam Ahmad; Muhd Futra Abdul Ghani; Sulaiman Salleh; Zulkarnain Arif	Regu	Myanmar; W 21-14, 21-18	1 Q	Indonesia; W 21-18, 21-19	Gold medal match Thailand; L 19-21, 20-22	2nd place, silver medalist(s)
Azlan Mubin; Mohd Normanizam Ahmad; Muhd Futra Abdul Ghani; Sulaiman Salleh; Zulkarnain Arif	Regu	Philippines; W 14-21, 21-13, 15-7	1 Q	Indonesia; W 21-18, 21-19	Gold medal match Thailand; L 19-21, 20-22	2nd place, silver medalist(s)
Azlan Mubin; Mohd Normanizam Ahmad; Muhd Futra Abdul Ghani; Sulaiman Salleh; Zulkarnain Arif	Regu	India; W 21-7, 21-7	1 Q	Indonesia; W 21-18, 21-19	Gold medal match Thailand; L 19-21, 20-22	2nd place, silver medalist(s)
Azlan Mubin; Mohd Normanizam Ahmad; Muhd Futra Abdul Ghani; Sulaiman Salleh; Zulkarnain Arif	Regu	Iran; W 21-7, 21-14	1 Q	Indonesia; W 21-18, 21-19	Gold medal match Thailand; L 19-21, 20-22	2nd place, silver medalist(s)
Ahmad Sufi Hashim; Azlan Mubin; Azman Nasruddin; Mohd Normanizam Ahmad; Muhd Futra Abdul Ghani; Noor Arifin Pawanteh; Rukman Mustapha; Saifudin Hussin; Saufi Salleh; Sulaiman Salleh; Zulhafizazudin Rosslan; Zulkarnain Arif	Team	India; W 21-7, 21-10; 21-12, 21-7; Walkover	1 Q	Indonesia; W 21-9, 21-11; 21-16, 21-16; 21-17, 21-13	Gold medal match Thailand; L 15-21, 15-21; 20-22, 12-21	2nd place, silver medalist(s)
Ahmad Sufi Hashim; Azlan Mubin; Azman Nasruddin; Mohd Normanizam Ahmad; Muhd Futra Abdul Ghani; Noor Arifin Pawanteh; Rukman Mustapha; Saifudin Hussin; Saufi Salleh; Sulaiman Salleh; Zulhafizazudin Rosslan; Zulkarnain Arif	Team	Japan; W 21-16, 21-13; 21-14, 21-8; 21-14, 21-12	1 Q	Indonesia; W 21-9, 21-11; 21-16, 21-16; 21-17, 21-13	Gold medal match Thailand; L 15-21, 15-21; 20-22, 12-21	2nd place, silver medalist(s)
Ahmad Sufi Hashim; Azlan Mubin; Azman Nasruddin; Mohd Normanizam Ahmad; Muhd Futra Abdul Ghani; Noor Arifin Pawanteh; Rukman Mustapha; Saifudin Hussin; Saufi Salleh; Sulaiman Salleh; Zulhafizazudin Rosslan; Zulkarnain Arif	Team	Myanmar; W 21-6, 21-17; 21-10, 21-18; 21-9, 19-21, 15-8	1 Q	Indonesia; W 21-9, 21-11; 21-16, 21-16; 21-17, 21-13	Gold medal match Thailand; L 15-21, 15-21; 20-22, 12-21	2nd place, silver medalist(s)

== Shooting ==
Men

Athlete	Event	Elimination		Qualification		Final	
Athlete	Event	Score	Rank	Score	Rank	Score	Rank
Hasli Izwan Amir Hassan	25 m center fire pistol	—N/a		568	26	Did not advance	
Hasli Izwan Amir Hassan	25 m rapid fire pistol	—N/a		567	15	Did not advance	
Mohamed Hameleay Abdul Mutalib	10 m air rifle	—N/a		588	16	Did not advance	
Mohamed Hameleay Abdul Mutalib	50 m rifle prone	573	38	580	30	Did not advance	
Mohamed Hameleay Abdul Mutalib	50 m rifle 3 positions	—N/a		1128	33	Did not advance	
Bernard Yeoh Cheng Han	Trap	—N/a		106	11	Did not advance	
Leong Wei Heng	Trap	—N/a		97	27	Did not advance	
Ng Beng Chong	Trap	—N/a		90	32	Did not advance	
Bernard Yeoh Cheng Han; Leong Wei Heng; Ng Beng Chong	Trap team	—N/a				293	7
Ricky Teh Chee Fei	Skeet	—N/a		109	33	Did not advance	

Women

Athlete	Event	Qualification		Final	
Athlete	Event	Score	Rank	Score	Rank
Bibiana Ng Pei Chin	10 m air pistol	373	31	Did not advance	
Joseline Cheah Lee Yean	10 m air pistol	377	19	Did not advance	
Siti Nur Masitah Badrin	10 m air pistol	374	25	Did not advance	
Bibiana Ng Pei Chin; Joseline Cheah Lee Yean; Siti Nur Masitah Badrin	10 m air pistol team	—N/a		1124	8
Bibiana Ng Pei Chin	25 m pistol	577	6 Q	773.3	8
Joseline Cheah Lee Yean	25 m pistol	555	35	Did not advance	
Siti Nur Masitah Badrin	25 m pistol	571	18	Did not advance	
Bibiana Ng Pei Chin; Joseline Cheah Lee Yean; Siti Nur Masitah Badrin	25 m pistol team	—N/a		1703	6
Cynthia Karen Leong	10 m air rifle	387	56	Did not advance	
Muslifah Zulkifli	10 m air rifle	391	17	Did not advance	
Nur Suryani Taibi	10 m air rifle	387	33	Did not advance	
Cynthia Karen Leong; Muslifah Zulkifli; Nur Suryani Taibi	10 m air rifle team	—N/a		1165	10
Mariani Mohamad Rafali	50 m rifle prone	—N/a		574	32
Nor Dalilah Abu Bakar	50 m rifle prone	—N/a		577	24
Nur Suryani Taibi	50 m rifle prone	—N/a		583	11
Mariani Mohamad Rafali; Nor Dalilah Abu Bakar; Nur Suryani Taibi	50 m rifle prone team	—N/a		1734	6
Mariani Mohamad Rafali	50 m rifle 3 positions	548	33	Did not advance	
Nor Dalilah Abu Bakar	50 m rifle 3 positions	551	30	Did not advance	
Nur Suryani Taibi	50 m rifle 3 positions	575	10	Did not advance	
Mariani Mohamad Rafali; Nor Dalilah Abu Bakar; Nur Suryani Taibi	50 m rifle 3 positions team	—N/a		1674	9

== Squash ==
Four Malaysian got themselves into the men's and women's individual semifinals. Sharon Wee Ee Lin was defeated by Hong Kong's Chiu Wing Yin with 9-6, 9-1, 9-3. Nicol Ann David and the other two Malaysian men's squash players did reach the final.

Defending champion Ong Beng Hee of Malaysia beat compatriot and top seed Mohamad Azlan Iskandar to claim the gold medal in the men's singles squash final at Khalifa International Complex on Thursday.

In a closely fought encounter, which could have gone either way, Ong prevailed 5–9, 9–1,10–9, 9–5. Iskander began the stronger, winning a series of long rallies and he was good value for his first set win. But thereafter things went awry for the top seed and Ong began to dictate terms.

Iskandar used gamesmanship on several occasions, prompting a number of lets during the match, but he was unable to disturb the concentration of Ong. Indeed, it was Iskandar who cracked first, throwing his racket to the ground in the crucial third game, which Ong just edged.

With Nicol Ann David's comfortable victory in the women's singles earlier in the day, Malaysia cleaned up on the courts, much to the delight of their supporters.

After the game, Ong said, "We've both done well. There were Malaysian finalists in both events. There were also a lot of VIPs here tonight, I see a lot of relieved faces!

"It's good to win, you never know when you can win another Asian Games gold medal. I was very nervous, I think he was very nervous too. I was very lucky to win the third game 10-9. If Azlan had won the third game 10-9, then it might have been a different story.

"I didn't think I played very well, but this was a tough match against a tough opponent who can easily dominate the court. I tried to use my mobility to move my opponent around the court."

Iskandar said, "I just hit too many errors, made too many mistakes. It's not rocket science.

"I've been mentally tired. But the best athletes have to back it up every match. The objective is to win, simple."

As expected, World no 1 Nicol Ann David won gold in the women's squash singles at the Khalifa International Complex on Thursday, 14 December. Four years ago, she suffered a devastating loss to Chiu Wing Yin at the final in Busan, Korea which caused her to take a four-month break from the game to reassess her career in the sport. But this time around it was a different story as she brushed aside her rival from Hong Kong, China 9–0, 9–3, 9–3 in just 30 minutes.

Clad in a striking red and black outfit, she stamped her authority on the game early on and raced into a 3–0 lead. She made good use of the court to stretch that advantage to 5–0. Try as she might, Chiu had no answer to Davis's incessant pressure and the opening game ended with a 9–0 whitewash in just six minutes.

David began the second game in similar fashion, winning the first point by varying her pace. Chiu finally broke the ice with a powerful shot to the right-hand corner of the court. But David was soon on top again and, after a series of long rallies, she stretched her lead to 4–1, before wrapping up the second game, 9–3.

In the third, the world No 1 raced into a 3–0 lead. Chiu managed to win a few points after an impressive array of shots and evened the score at 3-3. But David returned with a series of clinical executions to confirm her status as the Asian Games' top player and seal the match with a 9–3 score in the final game. Her gold was the 200th for Malaysia in Asian Games history.

After the game, David was keen to play down any talk of revenge, she said, “There is no thought of revenge. It is more about wanting to win that medal. She is a hard player to play and I had to keep her out of her comfort zone.

Individual

Athlete	Event	Round of 32	Round of 16	Quarterfinal	Semifinal	Final	
Athlete	Event	Opposition Score	Opposition Score	Opposition Score	Opposition Score	Opposition Score	Rank
Mohd Azlan Iskandar (1)	Men's singles	Bye	Kim Sung-young (KOR); W 9–3, 9–2, 9–0	Aamir Atlas Khan (PAK); W 9–7, 9–5, 9–2	Mansoor Zaman (PAK); W 10–8, 9–6, 9–7	Gold medal match Ong Beng Hee (MAS); L 9–5, 1–9, 9–10, 5–9	2nd place, silver medalist(s)
Ong Beng Hee (2)	Men's singles	Bye		Ali Al-Ramezi (KUW); W 9–6, 9–1, 9–0	Saurav Ghosal (IND); W 9–6, 9–1, 9–3	Gold medal match Mohd Azlan Iskandar (MAS); W 5–9, 9–1, 10–9, 9–5	1st place, gold medalist(s)
Nicol David (1)	Women's singles	—N/a	Bye	Park Eun-ok (KOR); W 9–0, 9–0, 9–4	Christina Mak (HKG); W 9–0, 9–1, 9–0	Gold medal match Rebecca Chiu (HKG); W 9–0, 9–3, 9–3	1st place, gold medalist(s)
Sharon Wee (3)	Women's singles	—N/a	Joyce Kuok (MAC); W 9–0, 9–0, 9–0	Chinatsu Matsui (JPN); W 9–3, 9–2, 9–2	Rebecca Chiu (HKG); L 6–9, 1–9, 3–9	Did not advance	3rd place, bronze medalist(s)

== Swimming ==
Men

Athlete	Event	Heat		Final	
Athlete	Event	Time	Rank	Time	Rank
Daniel Bego	100 m freestyle	52.17	11	Did not advance	
Daniel Bego	200 m freestyle	1:54.37	8 Q	1:56.25	8
Daniel Bego	400 m freestyle	4:01.17	7 Q	3:57.34	7
Alex Lim	50 m backstroke	26.16	4 Q	26.06	5
Alex Lim	100 m backstroke	57.39	4 Q	57.55	6
Alex Lim	50 m butterfly	25.37	11	Did not advance	
Daniel Bego	50 m butterfly	25.48	13	Did not advance	
Daniel Bego	100 m butterfly	54.93	5 Q	54.44	6
Daniel Bego	200 m butterfly	2:01.67	5 Q	2:01.32	7

Women

Athlete	Event	Heat		Final	
Athlete	Event	Time	Rank	Time	Rank
Chui Lai Kwan	50 m freestyle	27.55	16	Did not advance	
Chui Lai Kwan	100 m freestyle	1:00.13	17	Did not advance	
Ong Ming Xiu	200 m freestyle	2:08.81	12	Did not advance	
Ong Ming Xiu	400 m freestyle	4:29.13	12	Did not advance	
Ong Ming Xiu	800 m freestyle	—N/a		9:12.26	10
Chui Lai Kwan	50 m backstroke	31.46	12	Did not advance	
Chui Lai Kwan	100 m backstroke	1:08.12	13	Did not advance	
Ong Ming Xiu	200 m backstroke	2:24.74	9	Did not advance	
Siow Yi Ting	100 m breaststroke	1:11.72	6 Q	1:11.29	6
Siow Yi Ting	200 m breaststroke	2:32.95	4 Q	2:30.64	5
Siow Yi Ting	200 m individual medley	2:19.56	6 Q	2:17.57	6
Siow Yi Ting	400 m individual medley	5:06.93	9	Did not advance	

== Synchronized swimming ==
Athlete	Event	Technical routine		Free routine		Total points	Rank
Athlete	Event	Score	Rank	Score	Rank	Total points	Rank
Jillian Ng Siew Mei; Katrina Ann Abdul Hadi; Yshai Poo Voon	Duet	38.500	7	39.334	7	77.834	7
Irene Chong See Win; Jillian Ng Siew Mei; Katrina Ann Abdul Hadi; Mandy Yeap Mun Xin; Png Hui Chuen; Tan May Mei; Yeo Pei Ling; Yshai Poo Voon; Yshai Poo Yee; Zyanne Lee Zhien Huey	Team	40.667	5	42.000	5	82.667	5

== Triathlon ==
Athlete	Event	Swim (1.5 km) Rank	Transition 1 + Bike (40 km) Rank	Transition 2 + Run (10 km) Rank	Total time	Rank
Chan Wai Yong	Men's individual	23:59.00; 24	1:07:36.00; 19	44:45.92; 23	2:16:20.92	23
Heidilee Mohammad	Men's individual	28:21.00; 28	1:07:12.00; 17	37:47.05; 18	2:13:20.05	21
Kimbeley Yap Fui Lin	Women's individual	19:39.00; 1	1:08:17.00; 5	42:11.32; 9	2:10:07.32	7

== Volleyball ==
=== Beach volleyball ===
Men

Athlete	Round 1	Round 2	Round 3	Round 4	Semifinal	Final	Rank
Athlete	Opposition Score	Opposition Score	Opposition Score	Opposition Score	Opposition Score	Opposition Score	Rank
Mohd Rafiq Latif; Khoo Chong Long	Ayman Odeh (PLE); Rafi Asfour (PLE); W 1 - 2; 17-21, 21-14, 15-11	Koichi Nishimura (JPN); Satoshi Watanabe (JPN); L 0 - 2; 14-21, 5-21	Did not advance			17th placement match Khalifa Al-Jabri (OMA); Badar Al-Subhi (OMA); L 0 - 2; 15-21, 19-21	17

Women

Athlete	Round 1	Round 2	Round 3	Semifinal	Final	Rank
Athlete	Opposition Score	Opposition Score	Opposition Score	Opposition Score	Opposition Score	Rank
Luk Teck Hua; Beh Shun Thing	Irina Penkina (KAZ); Olga Dyachenko (KAZ); W 2 - 0; 21-19, 21-10	Wang Jie (CHN); Tian Jia (CHN); L 0 - 2; 10-21, 13-21	Did not advance		9th placement match Tse Wing Hung (HKG); Kong Cheuk Yee (HKG); W 2 - 0; 21-10, 26-24; 7th placement match Chiaki Kusuhara (JPN); Satoko Urata (JPN); L 0 - 2; 12-21, 17-21	7

== Weightlifting ==
Men

Athlete	Event	Snatch		Clean & Jerk		Total	Rank
Athlete	Event	Result	Rank	Result	Rank	Total	Rank
Roswadi Abdul Rashid	62 kg	115	12	135	12	250	11
Muhamad Hidayat Hamidon	69 kg	125	9	160	7	285	8
Che Mohd Azrul Che Mat	+105 kg	161	5	185	6	346	6

== Wushu ==
In women's Taijiquan - two events combined, Malaysian girls won both gold and bronze.

Chai Fong Ying of Malaysia has won the first wushu medal of Doha 2006 by securing the women's taijiquan two events combined crown. This is also the sixth gold of Malaysia in this game.

The World No.1 was a convincing winner, coming out on top in both the taijiquan (shadow boxing) and taijijian (taiji sword) disciplines to win with a score of 19.38.

Taolu

Athlete	Event	Changquan Score Rank	Daoshu Score Rank	Gunshu Score Rank	Total	Rank
Ang Eng Chong	Men's changquan	9.65; 3	9.60; 4	9.40; 6	28.65	5

Athlete	Event	Nanquan Score Rank	Nandao Score Rank	Nangun Score Rank	Total	Rank
Pui Fook Chien	Men's nanquan	9.23; 13	9.58; 6	9.67; 6	28.48	10
Diana Bong Siong Lin	Women's nanquan	9.22; 4	9.56; 5	9.50; 4	28.28	3rd place, bronze medalist(s)

Athlete	Event	Taijiquan Score Rank	Taijijian Score Rank	Total	Rank
Lee Yang	Men's taijiquan	9.17; 8	9.60; 3	18.77	8
Chai Fong Ying	Women's taijiquan	9.71; 1	9.67; 1	19.38	1st place, gold medalist(s)
Ng Shin Yii	Women's taijiquan	9.65; 3	9.57; 4	19.22	3rd place, bronze medalist(s)
