= Karate at the 2006 Asian Games =

Karate competition

- Venue: Qatar SC Indoor Hall
- Dates: 12–13 December 2006
- Competitors: 196 from 34 nations

Karate competed by men and women at the 2006 Asian Games in Doha, Qatar. Kata contested along with Kumite in seven weight classes for men and four for women. All competition took place at the Qatar Sports Club Indoor Hall on December 12 and 13. Each country was limited to having 5 male and 3 female athletes.

== Schedule ==
P	Preliminary rounds & Repechage	F	Finals

Event↓/Date →	12th Tue		13th Wed	
Men's kata	P	F		
Men's kumite 55 kg	P	F		
Men's kumite 60 kg	P	F		
Men's kumite 65 kg			P	F
Men's kumite 70 kg			P	F
Men's kumite 75 kg			P	F
Men's kumite 80 kg			P	F
Men's kumite +80 kg			P	F
Women's kata	P	F		
Women's kumite 48 kg	P	F		
Women's kumite 53 kg	P	F		
Women's kumite 60 kg			P	F
Women's kumite +60 kg			P	F

== Medalists ==
=== Men ===
Event	Gold	Silver	Bronze
Kata	Tetsuya Furukawa; Japan	Ku Jin Keat; Malaysia	Noel Espinosa; Philippines
Kata	Tetsuya Furukawa; Japan	Ku Jin Keat; Malaysia	Shen Chia-hao; Chinese Taipei
Kumite −55 kg	Hsieh Cheng-kang; Chinese Taipei	Puvaneswaran Ramasamy; Malaysia	Thamer Al-Malki; Saudi Arabia
Kumite −55 kg	Hsieh Cheng-kang; Chinese Taipei	Puvaneswaran Ramasamy; Malaysia	Phạm Trần Nguyên; Vietnam
Kumite −60 kg	Hossein Rouhani; Iran	Kunasilan Lakanathan; Malaysia	Huang Hsiang-chen; Chinese Taipei
Kumite −60 kg	Hossein Rouhani; Iran	Kunasilan Lakanathan; Malaysia	Abdullah Dalloul; Qatar
Kumite −65 kg	Hassan Rouhani; Iran	Shion Kayahara; Japan	Lim Yoke Wai; Malaysia
Kumite −65 kg	Hassan Rouhani; Iran	Shion Kayahara; Japan	Magid Adwan; Qatar
Kumite −70 kg	Abdullah Al-Otaibi; Kuwait	Naowras Al-Hamwi; Syria	Saeid Farrokhi; Iran
Kumite −70 kg	Abdullah Al-Otaibi; Kuwait	Naowras Al-Hamwi; Syria	Takuro Nihei; Japan
Kumite −75 kg	Jasem Vishkaei; Iran	Ko Matsuhisa; Japan	Shattyk Kazhymukanov; Kazakhstan
Kumite −75 kg	Jasem Vishkaei; Iran	Ko Matsuhisa; Japan	Talat Khalil; Jordan
Kumite −80 kg	Ahmad Muneer; Kuwait	Ryosuke Shimizu; Japan	Mutasembellah Khair; Jordan
Kumite −80 kg	Ahmad Muneer; Kuwait	Ryosuke Shimizu; Japan	Esmaeil Torkzad; Iran
Kumite +80 kg	Khalid Khalidov; Kazakhstan	Jaber Al-Hammad; Kuwait	Amer Abu Afifeh; Jordan
Kumite +80 kg	Khalid Khalidov; Kazakhstan	Jaber Al-Hammad; Kuwait	Umar Syarief; Indonesia

=== Women ===
Event	Gold	Silver	Bronze
Kata	Nao Morooka; Japan	Nguyễn Hoàng Ngân; Vietnam	Cheung Pui Si; Macau
Kata	Nao Morooka; Japan	Nguyễn Hoàng Ngân; Vietnam	Lim Lee Lee; Malaysia
Kumite −48 kg	Vũ Thị Nguyệt Ánh; Vietnam	Vasantha Marial Anthony; Malaysia	Jittikan Tiemsurakan; Thailand
Kumite −48 kg	Vũ Thị Nguyệt Ánh; Vietnam	Vasantha Marial Anthony; Malaysia	Chen Yen-hui; Chinese Taipei
Kumite −53 kg	Tomoko Araga; Japan	Marna Pabillore; Philippines	Venera Zhetibay; Kazakhstan
Kumite −53 kg	Tomoko Araga; Japan	Marna Pabillore; Philippines	Jenny Zeannet; Indonesia
Kumite −60 kg	Yuka Sato; Japan	Nguyễn Thị Hải Yến; Vietnam	Chan Ka Man; Hong Kong
Kumite −60 kg	Yuka Sato; Japan	Nguyễn Thị Hải Yến; Vietnam	Yamini Gopalasamy; Malaysia
Kumite +60 kg	Sofiya Kaspulatova; Uzbekistan	Maitha Al-Maktoum; United Arab Emirates	Mardiah Nasution; Indonesia
Kumite +60 kg	Sofiya Kaspulatova; Uzbekistan	Maitha Al-Maktoum; United Arab Emirates	Paula Carion; Macau

== Medal table ==
Rank	Nation	Gold	Silver	Bronze	Total
1	Japan (JPN)	4	3	1	8
2	Iran (IRI)	3	0	2	5
3	Kuwait (KUW)	2	1	0	3
4	Vietnam (VIE)	1	2	1	4
5	Chinese Taipei (TPE)	1	0	3	4
6	Kazakhstan (KAZ)	1	0	2	3
7	Uzbekistan (UZB)	1	0	0	1
8	Malaysia (MAS)	0	4	3	7
9	Philippines (PHI)	0	1	1	2
10	Syria (SYR)	0	1	0	1
10	United Arab Emirates (UAE)	0	1	0	1
12	Indonesia (INA)	0	0	3	3
12	Jordan (JOR)	0	0	3	3
14	Macau (MAC)	0	0	2	2
14	Qatar (QAT)	0	0	2	2
16	Hong Kong (HKG)	0	0	1	1
16	Saudi Arabia (KSA)	0	0	1	1
16	Thailand (THA)	0	0	1	1
Totals (18 entries)		13	13	26	52

== Participating nations ==
A total of 196 athletes from 34 nations competed in karate at the 2006 Asian Games:

- Afghanistan (6)
- Bahrain (4)
- Brunei (4)
- Chinese Taipei (8)
- Hong Kong (3)
- Indonesia (8)
- Iran (5)
- Japan (8)
- Jordan (7)
- Kazakhstan (8)
- Kuwait (6)
- Laos (1)
- Lebanon (8)
- Macau (7)
- Malaysia (8)
- Mongolia (6)
- Nepal (8)
- North Korea (5)
- Pakistan (5)
- Palestine (4)
- Philippines (8)
- Qatar (5)
- Saudi Arabia (4)
- Singapore (1)
- South Korea (7)
- Sri Lanka (7)
- Syria (8)
- Tajikistan (4)
- Thailand (3)
- Timor-Leste (4)
- United Arab Emirates (8)
- Uzbekistan (5)
- Vietnam (8)
- Yemen (5)
