= Squash at the 2006 Asian Games – Women's singles =

Women's singles at the 2006 Asian Games
- Venue: Khalifa International Tennis and Squash Complex
- Dates: 10–14 December 2006
- Competitors: 15 from 9 nations

Medalists
gold medal	Nicol David	Malaysia
silver medal	Rebecca Chiu	Hong Kong
bronze medal	Christina Mak	Hong Kong
bronze medal	Sharon Wee	Malaysia

The women's singles Squash event was part of the squash programme and took place between December 10 and 14, at the Khalifa International Tennis and Squash Complex.

== Schedule ==
All times are Arabia Standard Time (UTC+03:00)

Date	Time	Event
Sunday, 10 December 2006	15:00	Round 1
Monday, 11 December 2006	15:00	Round 1
Tuesday, 12 December 2006	12:00	Quarterfinals
Wednesday, 13 December 2006	16:00	Semifinals
Thursday, 14 December 2006	18:00	Final

== Results ==
=== Final ===
Final
1	Nicol David (MAS)	9	9	9
2	Rebecca Chiu (HKG)	0	3	3

=== Top half ===
Round 1
Dareen Toro (LIB)	0	0	0
8	Park Eun-ok (KOR)	9	9	9
7	Mami Nishio (JPN)	9	9	9
Nirasha Guruge (SRI)	1	2	1
Wendy Chan (MAC)	2	4	3
4	Christina Mak (HKG)	9	9	9

Quarterfinals
1	Nicol David (MAS)	9	9	9
8	Park Eun-ok (KOR)	0	0	4
7	Mami Nishio (JPN)	7	1	3
4	Christina Mak (HKG)	9	9	9

Semifinals
1	Nicol David (MAS)	9	9	9
4	Christina Mak (HKG)	0	1	0

=== Bottom half ===
Round 1
3	Sharon Wee (MAS)	9	9	9
Joyce Kuok (MAC)	0	0	0
Tehani Guruge (SRI)	0	2	3
6	Chinatsu Matsui (JPN)	9	9	9
5	Joshna Chinappa (IND)	10	4	9	9
Ahn Eun-chan (KOR)	8	9	7	4
Wu Zhenzhen (CHN)	2	6	1
2	Rebecca Chiu (HKG)	9	9	9

Quarterfinals
3	Sharon Wee (MAS)	9	9	9
6	Chinatsu Matsui (JPN)	3	2	2
5	Joshna Chinappa (IND)	3	1	2
2	Rebecca Chiu (HKG)	9	9	9

Semifinals
3	Sharon Wee (MAS)	6	1	3
2	Rebecca Chiu (HKG)	9	9	9
