= Diving at the 2006 Asian Games – Women's 3 metre springboard =

Women's 3 metre springboard at the 2006 Asian Games
- Venue: Hamad Aquatic Centre
- Date: 13 December 2006
- Competitors: 13 from 8 nations

Medalists
gold medal	Wu Minxia	China
silver medal	He Zi	China
bronze medal	Leong Mun Yee	Malaysia

The women's 3 metre springboard diving competition at the 2006 Asian Games in Doha was held on 13 December at the Hamad Aquatic Centre.

== Schedule ==
All times are Arabia Standard Time (UTC+03:00)

Date	Time	Event
Wednesday, 13 December 2006	10:00	Preliminary
Wednesday, 13 December 2006	18:00	Final

== Results ==
=== Preliminary ===
Rank	Athlete	Dive					Total
Rank	Athlete	1	2	3	4	5	Total
1	Wu Minxia (CHN)	75.00	75.40	75.95	76.50	78.00	380.85
2	He Zi (CHN)	73.50	74.40	70.50	72.00	67.50	357.90
3	Leong Mun Yee (MAS)	57.60	63.00	61.60	60.00	61.50	303.70
4	Ryoko Nishii (JPN)	57.60	54.00	67.50	45.00	64.50	288.60
5	Lu Hsin (TPE)	56.70	60.20	60.20	38.40	61.50	277.00
6	Elizabeth Jimie (MAS)	52.80	45.00	61.50	67.20	48.00	274.50
7	Lu En-tien (TPE)	52.80	44.55	50.40	60.20	37.50	245.45
8	Ceseil Domenios (PHI)	49.20	54.60	37.80	52.65	45.60	239.85
9	Choi Sut Ian (MAC)	43.20	49.20	44.55	51.80	51.00	239.75
10	Misako Yamashita (JPN)	57.60	63.00	16.50	54.00	48.00	239.10
11	Sukrutai Tommaoros (THA)	49.20	59.40	46.20	40.60	42.00	237.40
12	Nguyễn Hoài Anh (VIE)	48.00	36.45	46.00	42.00	44.10	216.55
13	Lei Sio I (MAC)	44.40	43.20	51.00	31.50	37.05	207.15

=== Final ===
Rank	Athlete	Dive					Total
Rank	Athlete	1	2	3	4	5	Total
1st place, gold medalist(s)	Wu Minxia (CHN)	75.00	75.40	75.95	78.00	67.50	371.85
2nd place, silver medalist(s)	He Zi (CHN)	73.50	74.40	72.00	75.00	72.00	366.90
3rd place, bronze medalist(s)	Leong Mun Yee (MAS)	57.60	64.50	67.20	49.50	69.00	307.80
4	Ryoko Nishii (JPN)	57.60	67.50	61.50	37.50	63.00	287.10
5	Misako Yamashita (JPN)	54.00	64.50	37.50	64.50	45.00	265.60
6	Lu Hsin (TPE)	52.65	57.40	33.60	52.80	58.50	254.95
7	Elizabeth Jimie (MAS)	51.60	49.50	34.50	67.20	50.40	253.20
8	Lu En-tien (TPE)	51.60	47.25	50.40	63.00	37.50	249.75
9	Choi Sut Ian (MAC)	39.60	49.20	41.85	58.80	55.50	244.95
10	Ceseil Domenios (PHI)	44.40	43.40	46.20	54.00	45.60	233.60
11	Nguyễn Hoài Anh (VIE)	45.60	48.60	30.00	39.20	45.15	208.55
12	Sukrutai Tommaoros (THA)	48.00	55.35	40.60	23.80	34.80	202.55
