= Cycling at the 2006 Asian Games – Men's keirin =

Men's keirin at the 2006 Asian Games
- Venue: Aspire Hall 1
- Date: 14 December 2006
- Competitors: 18 from 10 nations

Medalists
gold medal	Kang Dong-jin	South Korea
silver medal	Josiah Ng	Malaysia
bronze medal	Hiroyuki Inagaki	Japan

The men's keirin competition at the 2006 Asian Games was held on 14 December at the Aspire Hall 1.

== Schedule ==
All times are Arabia Standard Time (UTC+03:00)

Date	Time	Event
Thursday, 14 December 2006	12:30	First round
Thursday, 14 December 2006	13:47	First round repechages
Thursday, 14 December 2006	15:00	Second round
Thursday, 14 December 2006	15:28	Finals

== Results ==
Legend

- DNF — Did not finish
- DNS — Did not start
- REL — Relegated

=== First round ===
==== Heat 1 ====
Rank	Athlete	Notes
1	Kang Dong-jin (KOR)	
2	Mahmoud Parash (IRI)	
3	Mohd Rizal Tisin (MAS)	
4	Badr Ali Shambih (UAE)	
5	Edi Purnomo (INA)	
6	Mohamed Husain (BRN)	

==== Heat 2 ====
Rank	Athlete	Notes
1	Hiroyuki Inagaki (JPN)	
2	Liao Kuo-lung (TPE)	
3	Carlo Jazul (PHI)	
4	Farshid Farsinejadian (IRI)	
—	Gao Yahui (CHN)	REL
—	Samai Amari (INA)	DNS

==== Heat 3 ====
Rank	Athlete	Notes
1	Josiah Ng (MAS)	
—	Yang Hee-chun (KOR)	REL
—	Wang Qiming (CHN)	DNF
—	Keita Ebine (JPN)	DNF
—	Jan Paul Morales (PHI)	DNF
—	Lin Kun-hung (TPE)	DNF

=== First round repechages ===
==== Heat 1 ====
Rank	Athlete	Notes
1	Farshid Farsinejadian (IRI)	
2	Mohamed Husain (BRN)	
3	Gao Yahui (CHN)	
4	Mohd Rizal Tisin (MAS)	
—	Keita Ebine (JPN)	DNS
—	Jan Paul Morales (PHI)	DNS

==== Heat 2 ====
Rank	Athlete	Notes
1	Wang Qiming (CHN)	
2	Yang Hee-chun (KOR)	
3	Lin Kun-hung (TPE)	
4	Badr Ali Shambih (UAE)	
5	Carlo Jazul (PHI)	
6	Edi Purnomo (INA)	

=== Second round ===
==== Heat 1 ====
Rank	Athlete	Notes
1	Hiroyuki Inagaki (JPN)	
2	Kang Dong-jin (KOR)	
3	Wang Qiming (CHN)	
4	Farshid Farsinejadian (IRI)	
5	Mohd Rizal Tisin (MAS)	
6	Lin Kun-hung (TPE)	

==== Heat 2 ====
Rank	Athlete	Notes
1	Josiah Ng (MAS)	
2	Yang Hee-chun (KOR)	
3	Mahmoud Parash (IRI)	
4	Gao Yahui (CHN)	
5	Liao Kuo-lung (TPE)	
6	Mohamed Husain (BRN)	

=== Finals ===
==== Final B ====
Rank	Athlete	Notes
1	Gao Yahui (CHN)	
2	Liao Kuo-lung (TPE)	
3	Mohd Rizal Tisin (MAS)	
4	Farshid Farsinejadian (IRI)	
5	Lin Kun-hung (TPE)	
6	Mohamed Husain (BRN)	

==== Final A ====
Rank	Athlete	Notes
1	Kang Dong-jin (KOR)	
2	Josiah Ng (MAS)	
3	Hiroyuki Inagaki (JPN)	
4	Yang Hee-chun (KOR)	
5	Wang Qiming (CHN)	
6	Mahmoud Parash (IRI)	

== Final standing ==
Rank	Athlete
1st place, gold medalist(s)	Kang Dong-jin (KOR)
2nd place, silver medalist(s)	Josiah Ng (MAS)
3rd place, bronze medalist(s)	Hiroyuki Inagaki (JPN)
4	Yang Hee-chun (KOR)
5	Wang Qiming (CHN)
6	Mahmoud Parash (IRI)
7	Gao Yahui (CHN)
8	Liao Kuo-lung (TPE)
9	Mohd Rizal Tisin (MAS)
10	Farshid Farsinejadian (IRI)
11	Lin Kun-hung (TPE)
12	Mohamed Husain (BRN)
13	Badr Ali Shambih (UAE)
14	Carlo Jazul (PHI)
15	Edi Purnomo (INA)
16	Keita Ebine (JPN)
16	Jan Paul Morales (PHI)
—	Samai Amari (INA)
