= Diving at the 2006 Asian Games – Women's synchronized 3 metre springboard =

Asian Games diving event

Women's synchronized 3 metre springboard at the 2006 Asian Games
- Venue: Hamad Aquatic Centre
- Date: 11 December 2006
- Competitors: 12 from 6 nations

Medalists
gold medal	Guo Jingjing; Li Ting	China
silver medal	Misako Yamashita; Ryoko Nishii	Japan
bronze medal	Leong Mun Yee; Elizabeth Jimie	Malaysia

The women's synchronised 3 metre springboard diving competition at the 2006 Asian Games in Doha was held on 11 December at the Hamad Aquatic Centre.

== Schedule ==
All times are Arabia Standard Time (UTC+03:00)

Date	Time	Event
Monday, 11 December 2006	18:00	Final

== Results ==
Rank	Team	Dive					Total
Rank	Team	1	2	3	4	5	Total
1st place, gold medalist(s)	China (CHN); Guo Jingjing; Li Ting	52.80	54.60	76.50	74.70	79.20	337.80
2nd place, silver medalist(s)	Japan (JPN); Misako Yamashita; Ryoko Nishii	48.60	48.00	60.30	65.70	64.80	287.40
3rd place, bronze medalist(s)	Malaysia (MAS); Leong Mun Yee; Elizabeth Jimie	48.60	47.40	60.30	63.84	54.90	275.04
4	Chinese Taipei (TPE); Lu En-tien; Lu Hsin	46.80	45.60	57.51	61.32	60.30	271.53
5	Philippines (PHI); Sheila Mae Perez; Ceseil Domenios	45.60	43.80	50.40	56.28	55.44	251.52
6	Macau (MAC); Choi Sut Kuan; Choi Sut Ian	40.20	44.40	50.40	52.65	63.00	250.65
