= Diving at the 2006 Asian Games – Women's 1 metre springboard =

Men's 1 metre springboard at the 2006 Asian Games
- Venue: Hamad Aquatic Centre
- Date: 12 December 2006
- Competitors: 10 from 6 nations

Medalists
gold medal	Wu Minxia	China
silver medal	He Zi	China
bronze medal	Elizabeth Jimie	Malaysia

The women's 1 metre springboard diving competition at the 2006 Asian Games in Doha was held on 12 December at the Hamad Aquatic Centre.

== Schedule ==
All times are Arabia Standard Time (UTC+03:00)

Date	Time	Event
Tuesday, 12 December 2006	19:25	Final

== Results ==
Rank	Athlete	Dive					Total
Rank	Athlete	1	2	3	4	5	Total
1st place, gold medalist(s)	Wu Minxia (CHN)	60.00	60.95	62.40	66.30	67.60	317.25
2nd place, silver medalist(s)	He Zi (CHN)	62.40	62.00	55.20	69.00	63.70	312.30
3rd place, bronze medalist(s)	Elizabeth Jimie (MAS)	55.20	50.70	50.60	58.80	65.00	280.30
4	Leong Mun Yee (MAS)	51.60	52.00	47.15	50.40	61.10	262.25
5	Risa Asada (JPN)	54.00	51.60	50.60	52.80	47.30	256.30
6	Ryoko Nishii (JPN)	48.40	58.50	52.90	37.50	58.80	256.10
7	Lu Chen (TPE)	44.40	46.00	44.10	39.60	46.80	220.90
8	Hoàng Thanh Trà (VIE)	44.20	36.80	38.85	54.00	41.80	215.65
9	Lei Sio I (MAC)	36.75	46.80	22.10	44.85	40.80	191.30
10	Cheong Un Teng (MAC)	34.85	39.60	35.00	34.65	28.35	172.45
