= Squash at the 2006 Asian Games =

- Venue: Khalifa International Tennis and Squash Complex
- Dates: 10–14 December 2006
- Competitors: 42 from 16 nations

Squash was contested from 10 December 2006 to 14 December 2006 at the 2006 Asian Games in Doha, Qatar. Competition consists of men's and women's singles competition with all matches to be played at the Khalifa International Tennis and Squash Complex.

Malaysia finished first in medal table, winning both gold medals.

== Schedule ==
P	Preliminary rounds	¼	Quarterfinals	½	Semifinals	F	Final

Event↓/Date →	10th Sun	11th Mon	12th Tue	13th Wed	14th Thu
Men's singles	P	P	¼	½	F
Women's singles	P	P	¼	½	F

== Medalists ==
Event	Gold	Silver	Bronze
Men's singles	Ong Beng Hee; Malaysia	Mohd Azlan Iskandar; Malaysia	Mansoor Zaman; Pakistan
Men's singles	Ong Beng Hee; Malaysia	Mohd Azlan Iskandar; Malaysia	Saurav Ghosal; India
Women's singles	Nicol David; Malaysia	Rebecca Chiu; Hong Kong	Christina Mak; Hong Kong
Women's singles	Nicol David; Malaysia	Rebecca Chiu; Hong Kong	Sharon Wee; Malaysia

== Medal table ==
Rank	Nation	Gold	Silver	Bronze	Total
1	Malaysia (MAS)	2	1	1	4
2	Hong Kong (HKG)	0	1	1	2
3	India (IND)	0	0	1	1
3	Pakistan (PAK)	0	0	1	1
Totals (4 entries)		2	2	4	8

== Participating nations ==
A total of 42 athletes from 16 nations competed in squash at the 2006 Asian Games:

- Bahrain (2)
- China (2)
- Hong Kong (4)
- India (3)
- Iraq (1)
- Japan (2)
- Jordan (2)
- Kuwait (1)
- Lebanon (3)
- Macau (4)
- Malaysia (4)
- Pakistan (2)
- Philippines (2)
- Qatar (2)
- South Korea (4)
- Sri Lanka (4)
