= Swimming at the 2006 Asian Games – Women's 200 metre breaststroke =

Women's 200 metre breaststroke at the 2006 Asian Games
- Venue: Hamad Aquatic Centre
- Date: 6 December 2006
- Competitors: 14 from 10 nations

Medalists
gold medal	Qi Hui	China
silver medal	Luo Nan	China
bronze medal	Jung Seul-ki	South Korea

The women's 200m breaststroke swimming event at the 2006 Asian Games was held on December 6, 2006, at the Hamad Aquatic Centre in Doha, Qatar.

== Schedule ==
All times are Arabia Standard Time (UTC+03:00)

Date	Time	Event
Wednesday, 6 December 2006	10:32	Heats
Wednesday, 6 December 2006	18:12	Final

== Records ==
Prior to this competition, the existing world, Asian and Games records were as follows.

World Record	Leisel Jones (AUS)	2:20.54	Melbourne, Australia	1 February 2006
Asian Record	Qi Hui (CHN)	2:22.99	Hangzhou, China	13 April 2001
Games Record	Qi Hui (CHN)	2:24.01	Busan, South Korea	3 October 2002

== Results ==
=== Heats ===
Rank	Heat	Athlete	Time	Notes
1	2	Qi Hui (CHN)	2:28.71	
2	2	Asami Kitagawa (JPN)	2:30.11	
3	1	Jung Seul-ki (KOR)	2:30.29	
4	2	Siow Yi Ting (MAS)	2:32.95	
5	1	Luo Nan (CHN)	2:33.30	
6	1	Back Su-yeon (KOR)	2:33.37	
7	1	Nicolette Teo (SIN)	2:37.41	
8	2	Yoshimi Miwa (JPN)	2:39.68	
9	1	Sally Tse (HKG)	2:41.05	
10	1	Denjylie Cordero (PHI)	2:41.41	
11	2	Vũ Thùy Dương (VIE)	2:45.94	
12	2	Lei Sin Ian (MAC)	2:49.28	
13	1	Lei On Kei (MAC)	2:50.29	
14	2	Mayumi Raheem (SRI)	2:51.59	

=== Final ===
Rank	Athlete	Time	Notes
1st place, gold medalist(s)	Qi Hui (CHN)	2:23.93	GR
2nd place, silver medalist(s)	Luo Nan (CHN)	2:27.49	
3rd place, bronze medalist(s)	Jung Seul-ki (KOR)	2:27.82	
4	Asami Kitagawa (JPN)	2:28.81	
5	Siow Yi Ting (MAS)	2:30.64	
6	Back Su-yeon (KOR)	2:30.85	
7	Nicolette Teo (SIN)	2:38.43	
8	Yoshimi Miwa (JPN)	2:39.73	
