= Cycling at the 2006 Asian Games – Men's 1 kilometre time trial =

Men's 1 kilometre time trial at the 2006 Asian Games
- Venue: Aspire Hall 1
- Date: 9 December 2006
- Competitors: 11 from 11 nations

Medalists
gold medal	Feng Yong	China
silver medal	Yusho Oikawa	Japan
bronze medal	Kang Dong-jin	South Korea

The men's 1 km time trial competition at the 2006 Asian Games was held on 9 December at the Aspire Hall 1.

== Schedule ==
All times are Arabia Standard Time (UTC+03:00)

Date	Time	Event
Saturday, 9 December 2006	14:58	Final

== Records ==
Prior to this competition, the existing world, Asian and Games records were as follows.

World Record	Arnaud Tournant (FRA)	58.875	La Paz, Bolivia	10 October 2001
Asian Record	Toshiaki Fushimi (JPN)	1:02.158	Kunming, China	11 August 2002
Games Record	Ji Sung-hwan (KOR)	1:05.406	Bangkok, Thailand	14 December 1998

== Results ==
Rank	Athlete	Time	Notes
1st place, gold medalist(s)	Feng Yong (CHN)	1:04.607	GR
2nd place, silver medalist(s)	Yusho Oikawa (JPN)	1:04.775	
3rd place, bronze medalist(s)	Kang Dong-jin (KOR)	1:04.786	
4	Liao Kuo-lung (TPE)	1:06.358	
5	Mohd Hafiz Sufian (MAS)	1:06.667	
6	Hassan Ali Varposhti (IRI)	1:07.128	
7	Jan Paul Morales (PHI)	1:08.442	
8	Badr Ali Shambih (UAE)	1:09.869	
9	Ayman Al-Habriti (KSA)	1:16.516	
10	Sayed Ahmed Alawi (BRN)	1:16.582	
11	Farkad Jassim (IRQ)	1:17.585	
