= Karate at the 2006 Asian Games – Women's kumite 48 kg =

Karate competition

Women's kumite 48 kg at the 2006 Asian Games
- Venue: Qatar SC Indoor Hall
- Date: 12 December 2006
- Competitors: 14 from 14 nations

Medalists
gold medal	Vũ Thị Nguyệt Ánh	Vietnam
silver medal	Vasantha Marial Anthony	Malaysia
bronze medal	Jittikan Tiemsurakan	Thailand
bronze medal	Chen Yen-hui	Chinese Taipei

The women's kumite 48 kilograms competition at the 2006 Asian Games in Doha, Qatar, was held on 12 December 2006 at the Qatar SC Indoor Hall.

== Schedule ==
All times are Arabia Standard Time (UTC+03:00)

Date	Time	Event
Tuesday, 12 December 2006	14:00	1/8 finals
Tuesday, 12 December 2006	14:00	Quarterfinals
Tuesday, 12 December 2006	14:00	Semifinals
Tuesday, 12 December 2006	14:00	Repechage 1R
Tuesday, 12 December 2006	14:00	Finals

== Results ==
Legend

- H — Won by hansoku

=== Main bracket ===
1/8 finals
Ana Maria Pinto (TLS)	1
Mae Soriano (PHI)	9
Kang Ji-ui (PRK)	6^{H}
Amali Iresha Perera (SRI)	1
Jittikan Tiemsurakan (THA)	8
Sanaobar Akbari (AFG)	0
Hiba Harmoush (UAE)	1
Vasantha Marial Anthony (MAS)	4
Kou Man I (MAC)	6
Krishna Kala (NEP)	3
Chen Yen-hui (TPE)	4
Galina Vassilyeva (KAZ)	2

Quarterfinals
Vũ Thị Nguyệt Ánh (VIE)	2
Mae Soriano (PHI)	1
Kang Ji-ui (PRK)	0
Jittikan Tiemsurakan (THA)	5
Vasantha Marial Anthony (MAS)	5
Kou Man I (MAC)	1
Chen Yen-hui (TPE)	3
Kim Jin (KOR)	1

Semifinals
Vũ Thị Nguyệt Ánh (VIE)	4
Jittikan Tiemsurakan (THA)	0
Vasantha Marial Anthony (MAS)	7
Chen Yen-hui (TPE)	4

Final
Vũ Thị Nguyệt Ánh (VIE)	6
Vasantha Marial Anthony (MAS)	1

=== Repechage ===
Repechage 1R
Kou Man I (MAC)	2
Hiba Harmoush (UAE)	1

Final repechage
Jittikan Tiemsurakan (THA)	3
Mae Soriano (PHI)	1
Kou Man I (MAC)	3
Chen Yen-hui (TPE)	9
