= Karate at the 2006 Asian Games – Men's kata =

Karate competition

Men's kata at the 2006 Asian Games
- Venue: Qatar SC Indoor Hall
- Date: 12 December 2006
- Competitors: 13 from 13 nations

Medalists
gold medal	Tetsuya Furukawa	Japan
silver medal	Ku Jin Keat	Malaysia
bronze medal	Noel Espinosa	Philippines
bronze medal	Shen Chia-hao	Chinese Taipei

The men's individual kata competition at the 2006 Asian Games in Doha, Qatar was held on 12 December 2006 at the Qatar SC Indoor Hall.

Tetsuya Furukawa from Japan won the gold medal.

== Schedule ==
All times are Arabia Standard Time (UTC+03:00)

Date	Time	Event
Tuesday, 12 December 2006	10:00	1/8 finals
Tuesday, 12 December 2006	10:00	Quarterfinals
Tuesday, 12 December 2006	10:00	Semifinals
Tuesday, 12 December 2006	10:00	Repechage 1R
Tuesday, 12 December 2006	11:30	Finals

== Results ==
=== Main bracket ===
1/8 finals
Noel Espinosa (PHI)	5
Inthanousone Vilaysouk (LAO)	0
Diaaldeen Al-Karaky (PLE)	5
Vijayantha Gunarathna (SRI)	0
Ghulam Ali (PAK)	3
Abdul Malik Mohd Zaini (BRU)	2
Enkhbatyn Enkhjin (MGL)	0
Ku Jin Keat (MAS)	5
Abdulaziz Dalloul (QAT)	2
Vong Ka Seng (MAC)	3

Quarterfinals
Lee Chi Kit (HKG)	1
Noel Espinosa (PHI)	4
Diaaldeen Al-Karaky (PLE)	0
Tetsuya Furukawa (JPN)	5
Ghulam Ali (PAK)	0
Ku Jin Keat (MAS)	5
Vong Ka Seng (MAC)	1
Shen Chia-hao (TPE)	4

Semifinals
Noel Espinosa (PHI)	0
Tetsuya Furukawa (JPN)	5
Ku Jin Keat (MAS)	3
Shen Chia-hao (TPE)	2

Final
Tetsuya Furukawa (JPN)	5
Ku Jin Keat (MAS)	0

=== Repechage ===
Repechage 1R
Ghulam Ali (PAK)	5
Enkhbatyn Enkhjin (MGL)	0

Final repechage
Noel Espinosa (PHI)	5
Diaaldeen Al-Karaky (PLE)	0
Ghulam Ali (PAK)	1
Shen Chia-hao (TPE)	4
