= Sepak takraw at the 2006 Asian Games – Men's regu =

Men's regu at the 2006 Asian Games
- Venue: Al-Sadd Indoor Hall
- Date: 8–10 December 2006
- Competitors: 48 from 10 nations

Medalists
gold medal	Thailand
silver medal	Malaysia
bronze medal	Myanmar
bronze medal	Indonesia

The men's regu sepak takraw competition at the 2006 Asian Games in Doha was held from 8 December to 10 December at the Al-Sadd Indoor Hall.

== Squads ==
India	Indonesia	Iran	Japan
Chinganbam Geskant; Surjit Singh Waikom; Biken Singh Chabungbam; Jotin Singh Khangembam; Kiran Kumar Singh	Yudi Purnomo; Muhammad Nasrum; Jusri Pakke; Husni Uba; Edy Suwarno	Armin Farazmand; Majid Salmani; Jamil Kor; Hamid Jafaripour	Susumu Teramoto; Yuichi Matsuda; Takeshi Terashima; Yoshitaka Iida; Tomoyuki Nakatsuka
Malaysia	Myanmar	Philippines	South Korea
Normanizam Ahmad; Sulaiman Salleh; Futra Abd Ghani; Azlan Abdul Mubin; Zulkarnain Arif	Yazar Tun; Zaw Latt; Oaka Soe; Aung Cho Myint; Zaw Zaw Aung	Harrison Castañares; Jolly Aglubo; Danilo Alipan; Metodio Suico	Kim Hyun-jun; Lee Jun-ho; Han Sang-hwi; Joo Hyun-jin; Ko Myung-suk
Thailand	Vietnam		
Suebsak Phunsueb; Panomporn Aiemsaard; Pornchai Kaokaew; Somporn Jaisinghol; Singha Somsakul	Trịnh Đình Kiên; Đỗ Trung Hiếu; Đinh Quang Tuấn; Phạm Viết Thành; Nguyễn Trọng Thủy		

== Results ==
All times are Arabia Standard Time (UTC+03:00)

=== Preliminary ===
==== Group A ====
Pos	Team	Pld	W	L	SF	SA	SD	Pts	Qualification
1	Thailand	4	4	0	8	0	+8	8	Semifinals
2	Indonesia	4	3	1	6	2	+4	6	Semifinals
3	Vietnam	4	2	2	4	4	0	4	
4	South Korea	4	1	3	2	6	−4	2	
5	Japan	4	0	4	0	8	−8	0	

Source: Official website

Date	Time		Score		Set 1	Set 2	Set 3
08 Dec	09:00	Thailand	2–0	Vietnam	21–7	21–16	
08 Dec	10:00	South Korea	2–0	Japan	21–15	21–18	
08 Dec	15:00	Thailand	2–0	Indonesia	21–17	21–16	
08 Dec	16:00	Japan	0–2	Vietnam	20–22	23–25	
08 Dec	19:00	South Korea	0–2	Indonesia	14–21	21–23	
09 Dec	09:00	South Korea	0–2	Vietnam	15–21	17–21	
09 Dec	10:00	Indonesia	2–0	Japan	21–16	21–10	
09 Dec	14:00	Thailand	2–0	South Korea	21–16	21–8	
09 Dec	15:00	Indonesia	2–0	Vietnam	21–15	21–18	
09 Dec	18:00	Thailand	2–0	Japan	21–8	21–14	

==== Group B ====
Pos	Team	Pld	W	L	SF	SA	SD	Pts	Qualification
1	Malaysia	4	4	0	8	1	+7	8	Semifinals
2	Myanmar	4	3	1	6	3	+3	6	Semifinals
3	Philippines	4	2	2	6	5	+1	4	
4	India	4	1	3	3	6	−3	2	
5	Iran	4	0	4	0	8	−8	0	

Source: Official website

Date	Time		Score		Set 1	Set 2	Set 3
08 Dec	09:00	Myanmar	2–0	Iran	21–7	21–7	
08 Dec	10:00	Philippines	2–1	India	19–21	21–18	15–9
08 Dec	15:00	Myanmar	0–2	Malaysia	14–21	18–21	
08 Dec	16:00	India	2–0	Iran	21–9	21–9	
08 Dec	20:00	Philippines	1–2	Malaysia	21–14	3–21	7–15
09 Dec	09:00	Philippines	2–0	Iran	21–14	21–13	
09 Dec	10:00	Malaysia	2–0	India	21–7	21–7	
09 Dec	14:00	Myanmar	2–1	Philippines	21–19	18–21	15–9
09 Dec	15:00	Malaysia	2–0	Iran	21–7	21–14	
09 Dec	18:00	Myanmar	2–0	India	21–17	21–17	

=== Knockout round ===
Semifinals
10 December
Thailand	2
Myanmar	0
10 December
Malaysia	2
Indonesia	0

Final
10 December
Thailand	2
Malaysia	0

==== Semifinals ====
Date	Time		Score		Set 1	Set 2	Set 3
10 Dec	11:00	Thailand	2–0	Myanmar	21–14	21–17	
10 Dec	12:00	Malaysia	2–0	Indonesia	21–18	21–19	

==== Final ====
Date	Time		Score		Set 1	Set 2	Set 3
10 Dec	17:00	Thailand	2–0	Malaysia	21–19	22–20	
