= Gymnastics at the 2006 Asian Games – Men's vault =

Men's vault at the 2006 Asian Games
- Venue: Aspire Hall 2
- Date: 2–6 December 2006
- Competitors: 14 from 11 nations

Medalists
gold medal	Ri Se-gwang	North Korea
silver medal	Ng Shu Wai	Malaysia
bronze medal	Yernar Yerimbetov	Kazakhstan

The men's vault competition at the 2006 Asian Games in Doha, Qatar was held on 2 and 6 December 2006 at the Aspire Hall 2.

== Schedule ==
All times are Arabia Standard Time (UTC+03:00)

Date	Time	Event
Saturday, 2 December 2006	12:00	Qualification
Wednesday, 6 December 2006	16:00	Final

== Results ==
=== Qualification ===
Rank	Athlete	Vault 1	Vault 2	Total
1	Ng Shu Wai (MAS)	16.600	16.150	16.375
2	Ri Se-gwang (PRK)	16.650	15.650	16.150
3	Huang Yi-hsueh (TPE)	16.600	15.650	16.125
4	Nguyễn Hà Thanh (VIE)	15.800	16.350	16.075
5	Yernar Yerimbetov (KAZ)	15.900	15.950	15.925
6	Roel Ramirez (PHI)	15.650	15.850	15.750
7	Maki Al-Mubiareek (KSA)	15.850	15.500	15.675
8	Sain Autalipov (KAZ)	15.650	15.200	15.425
9	Ooi Wei Siang (MAS)	15.800	14.950	15.375
10	Jad Mazahreh (JOR)	15.450	15.150	15.300
11	Mayank Srivastava (IND)	15.100	14.700	14.900
12	Nasser Al-Hamad (QAT)	14.500	14.050	14.275
13	Muhammad Afzal (PAK)	14.150	13.350	13.750
14	Hầu Trung Linh (VIE)	15.050	0.000	7.525

=== Final ===
Rank	Athlete	Vault 1	Vault 2	Total
1st place, gold medalist(s)	Ri Se-gwang (PRK)	16.575	16.675	16.625
2nd place, silver medalist(s)	Ng Shu Wai (MAS)	16.325	16.650	16.487
3rd place, bronze medalist(s)	Yernar Yerimbetov (KAZ)	16.375	16.225	16.300
4	Sain Autalipov (KAZ)	16.175	16.100	16.137
5	Nguyễn Hà Thanh (VIE)	15.625	16.275	15.950
6	Roel Ramirez (PHI)	15.600	15.800	15.700
7	Maki Al-Mubiareek (KSA)	15.375	15.725	15.550
8	Huang Yi-hsueh (TPE)	16.475	0.000	8.237
