= List of Asian Games records in bowling =

This is the list of Asian Games records in bowling.

== Men ==
Event	Pinfalls	Athlete	Nation	Games	Date
Singles
1 Game	289	Takuya Miyazawa	Japan	2018 Jakarta–Palembang	27 August 2018
1 Game	289	Koo Seong-hoi	South Korea	2018 Jakarta–Palembang	27 August 2018
12 Games	2925	Ryan Leonard Lalisang	Indonesia	2018 Jakarta–Palembang	23–25 August 2018
16 Games + Bonus	4005	Muhammad Rafiq Ismail	Malaysia	2018 Jakarta–Palembang	26–27 August 2018
Trios
1 Game	798	Tomoyuki Sasaki; Shogo Wada; Shusaku Asato	Japan	2018 Jakarta–Palembang	23 August 2018
3 Games	2286	Tomoyuki Sasaki; Shogo Wada; Shusaku Asato	Japan	2018 Jakarta–Palembang	23 August 2018
6 Games	4344	Tomoyuki Sasaki; Shogo Wada; Shusaku Asato	Japan	2018 Jakarta–Palembang	23 August 2018
Team of 6
1 Game	1519	Choi Bok-eum; Hong Hae-sol; Park Jong-woo; Kim Jong-wook; Koo Seong-hoi; Kang Hee-won	South Korea	2018 Jakarta–Palembang	25 August 2018
3 Games	4378	Choi Bok-eum; Hong Hae-sol; Park Jong-woo; Kim Jong-wook; Koo Seong-hoi; Kang Hee-won	South Korea	2018 Jakarta–Palembang	25 August 2018
6 Games	8540	Choi Bok-eum; Hong Hae-sol; Park Jong-woo; Kim Jong-wook; Koo Seong-hoi; Kang Hee-won	South Korea	2018 Jakarta–Palembang	25 August 2018

== Women ==
Event	Pinfalls	Athlete	Nation	Games	Date
Singles
1 Game	278	Daphne Tan	Singapore	2018 Jakarta–Palembang	26 August 2018
1 Game	278	Lee Yeon-ji	South Korea	2018 Jakarta–Palembang	27 August 2018
12 Games	2918	Syaidatul Afifah	Malaysia	2018 Jakarta–Palembang	22–24 August 2018
16 Games + Bonus	3948	Mirai Ishimoto	Japan	2018 Jakarta–Palembang	26–27 August 2018
Trios
1 Game	820	Joey Yeo; Daphne Tan; Bernice Lim	Singapore	2018 Jakarta–Palembang	22 August 2018
3 Games	2257	Joey Yeo; Daphne Tan; Bernice Lim	Singapore	2018 Jakarta–Palembang	22 August 2018
6 Games	4326	Esther Cheah; Siti Safiyah; Syaidatul Afifah	Malaysia	2018 Jakarta–Palembang	22 August 2018
Team of 6
1 Game	1557	Baek Seung-ja; Han Byul; Kim Hyun-mi; Lee Yeon-ji; Ryu Seo-yeon; Lee Na-young	South Korea	2018 Jakarta–Palembang	24 August 2018
3 Games	4247	Baek Seung-ja; Han Byul; Kim Hyun-mi; Lee Yeon-ji; Ryu Seo-yeon; Lee Na-young	South Korea	2018 Jakarta–Palembang	24 August 2018
6 Games	8338	Baek Seung-ja; Han Byul; Kim Hyun-mi; Lee Yeon-ji; Ryu Seo-yeon; Lee Na-young	South Korea	2018 Jakarta–Palembang	24 August 2018
