= Cue sports at the 2006 Asian Games – Women's nine-ball singles =

Women's nine-ball singles at the 2006 Asian Games
- Venue: Al-Sadd Multi-Purpose Hall
- Dates: 9–11 December 2006
- Competitors: 20 from 10 nations

Medalists
gold medal	Liu Shin-mei	Chinese Taipei
silver medal	Esther Kwan	Malaysia
bronze medal	Pan Xiaoting	China

The women's nine-ball singles tournament at the 2006 Asian Games in Doha took place from 9 December to 11 December at Al-Sadd Multi-Purpose Hall.

== Schedule ==
All times are Arabia Standard Time (UTC+03:00)

Date	Time	Event
Saturday, 9 December 2006	13:00	Round of 32
Saturday, 9 December 2006	13:00	Round of 16
Sunday, 10 December 2006	16:00	Quarterfinals
Monday, 11 December 2006	10:00	Semifinals
Monday, 11 December 2006	16:00	Finals

== Results ==
Legend

- WO — Won by walkover

=== Finals ===
Gold medal match
Liu Shin-mei (TPE)	7
Esther Kwan (MAS)	3

Bronze medal match
Pan Xiaoting (CHN)	7
Iris Ranola (PHI)	6

=== Top half ===
Round of 32
Liu Shin-mei (TPE)	7
Nada Abdullah (SYR)	0
Cha Yu-ram (KOR)	7
Rubilen Amit (PHI)	5

Round of 16
Pan Xiaoting (CHN)	7
Charlene Chai (SIN)	3
Santhinee Jaisuekul (THA)	7
Miyuki Fuke (JPN)	2
Liu Shin-mei (TPE)	7
Vidya Pillai (IND)	6
Cha Yu-ram (KOR)	4
Suhana Dewi Sabtu (MAS)	7

Quarterfinals
Pan Xiaoting (CHN)	7
Santhinee Jaisuekul (THA)	3
Liu Shin-mei (TPE)	7
Suhana Dewi Sabtu (MAS)	2

Semifinals
Pan Xiaoting (CHN)	3
Liu Shin-mei (TPE)	7

=== Bottom half ===
Round of 32
Iris Ranola (PHI)	7
Vana Degermanji (SYR)	3
Kim Ga-young (KOR)	4
Tan Hsiang-lin (TPE)	7

Round of 16
Akio Otani (JPN)	6
Iris Ranola (PHI)	7
Vutthiphan Kongkaket (THA)	4
Tan Hsiang-lin (TPE)	7
Amy Hoe (SIN)	5
Esther Kwan (MAS)	7
Meenal Thakur (IND)	WO
Zhou Mengmeng (CHN)

Quarterfinals
Iris Ranola (PHI)	7
Tan Hsiang-lin (TPE)	6
Esther Kwan (MAS)	7
Meenal Thakur (IND)	2

Semifinals
Iris Ranola (PHI)	4
Esther Kwan (MAS)	7
