= Bodybuilding at the 2006 Asian Games – Men's 65 kg =

Men's 65 kg at the 2006 Asian Games
- Venue: Al-Dana Banquet Hall
- Date: 8 December 2006
- Competitors: 15 from 13 nations

Medalists
| gold medal | Mohammed Salem Al-Zahmi | United Arab Emirates |
| silver medal | Sazali Abdul Samad | Malaysia |
| bronze medal | Chong Ka Lap | Macau |

The men's 65 kilograms event at the 2006 Asian Games was held on December 8, 2006 at the Al-Dana Banquet Hall in Doha, Qatar.

== Schedule ==
All times are Arabia Standard Time (UTC+03:00)

| Date | Time | Event |
|---|---|---|
| Friday, 8 December 2006 | 10:45 | Prejudging round |
| Friday, 8 December 2006 | 16:35 | Final round |

== Results ==
=== Prejudging round ===
| Rank | Athlete | Score |
|---|---|---|
| 1 | Mohammed Salem Al-Zahmi (UAE) | 7 |
| 2 | Sazali Abdul Samad (MAS) | 8 |
| 3 | Chong Ka Lap (MAC) | 17 |
| 4 | Faisal Al-Salman (BRN) | 20 |
| 5 | Nasser Al-Maskari (OMA) | 34 |
| 6 | Amir Zainal (SIN) | 36 |
| 7 | Somsri Turinthaisong (THA) | 37 |
| 8 | Nguyễn Văn Lâm (VIE) | 37 |
| 9 | Nor Perwira Jaya Rahmat (SIN) | 41 |
| 10 | Andy Wong (HKG) | 43 |
| 11 | Rezvan Aliyev (KAZ) | 55 |
| 12 | Pojoh Benny Heintje (INA) | 57 |
| 13 | Ricky Posas (PHI) | 67 |
| 14 | Lei Sio Lon (MAC) | 68 |
| 15 | Nihad Rasheed (MDV) | 74 |

=== Final round ===
| Rank | Athlete | Prej. | Final | Total |
|---|---|---|---|---|
| 1st place, gold medalist(s) | Mohammed Salem Al-Zahmi (UAE) | 7 | 7 | 14 |
| 2nd place, silver medalist(s) | Sazali Abdul Samad (MAS) | 8 | 8 | 16 |
| 3rd place, bronze medalist(s) | Chong Ka Lap (MAC) | 17 | 16 | 33 |
| 4 | Faisal Al-Salman (BRN) | 20 | 19 | 39 |
| 5 | Nasser Al-Maskari (OMA) | 34 | 24 | 58 |
