= Karate at the 2006 Asian Games – Women's kumite +60 kg =

Karate competition

Women's kumite +60 kg at the 2006 Asian Games
- Venue: Qatar SC Indoor Hall
- Date: 13 December 2006
- Competitors: 13 from 13 nations

Medalists
gold medal	Sofiya Kaspulatova	Uzbekistan
silver medal	Maitha Al-Maktoum	United Arab Emirates
bronze medal	Mardiah Nasution	Indonesia
bronze medal	Paula Carion	Macau

The women's kumite +60 kilograms competition at the 2006 Asian Games in Doha, Qatar was held on 13 December 2006 at the Qatar SC Indoor Hall.

== Schedule ==
All times are Arabia Standard Time (UTC+03:00)

Date	Time	Event
Wednesday, 13 December 2006	13:00	1/8 finals
Wednesday, 13 December 2006	13:00	Quarterfinals
Wednesday, 13 December 2006	13:00	Semifinals
Wednesday, 13 December 2006	13:00	Repechage 1R
Wednesday, 13 December 2006	13:00	Finals

== Results ==
Legend

- H — Won by hansoku
- K — Won by kiken (8–0)

=== Main bracket ===
1/8 finals
Aliya Kuanova (KAZ)	1
Manar Shath (JOR)	2
Souha Salman (LIB)
Abrar Abdulsayed (KUW)	K
Choe Un-ju (PRK)	3
Sofiya Kaspulatova (UZB)	7
Paula Carion (MAC)	7
Gretchen Malalad (PHI)	5
Pashkagiin Sugarmaa (MGL)	1
Aghadeer Haydar (SYR)	9

Quarterfinals
Mardiah Nasution (INA)	6
Manar Shath (JOR)	3
Abrar Abdulsayed (KUW)	1
Maitha Al-Maktoum (UAE)	7
Sofiya Kaspulatova (UZB)	9
Paula Carion (MAC)	8
Aghadeer Haydar (SYR)	7
Liu Ya-li (TPE)	8

Semifinals
Mardiah Nasution (INA)	3
Maitha Al-Maktoum (UAE)	4
Sofiya Kaspulatova (UZB)	5
Liu Ya-li (TPE)	2

Final
Maitha Al-Maktoum (UAE)	0
Sofiya Kaspulatova (UZB)	5

=== Repechage ===
Repechage 1R
Paula Carion (MAC)	12^{H}
Choe Un-ju (PRK)	5

Final repechage
Mardiah Nasution (INA)	6
Abrar Abdulsayed (KUW)	4
Paula Carion (MAC)	2
Liu Ya-li (TPE)	0
