= Karate at the 2006 Asian Games – Women's kumite 53 kg =

Karate competition

Women's kumite 53 kg at the 2006 Asian Games
- Venue: Qatar SC Indoor Hall
- Date: 12 December 2006
- Competitors: 14 from 14 nations

Medalists
| gold medal | Tomoko Araga | Japan |
| silver medal | Marna Pabillore | Philippines |
| bronze medal | Venera Zhetibay | Kazakhstan |
| bronze medal | Jenny Zeannet | Indonesia |

The women's kumite 53 kilograms competition at the 2006 Asian Games in Doha, Qatar was held on 12 December 2006 at the Qatar SC Indoor Hall.

A total of fourteen competitors from fourteen countries competed in this event, limited to fighters whose body weight was less than 53 kilograms.

== Schedule ==
All times are Arabia Standard Time (UTC+03:00)

| Date | Time | Event |
|---|---|---|
| Tuesday, 12 December 2006 | 14:00 | 1/8 finals |
| Tuesday, 12 December 2006 | 14:00 | Quarterfinals |
| Tuesday, 12 December 2006 | 14:00 | Semifinals |
| Tuesday, 12 December 2006 | 14:00 | Repechage 1R |
| Tuesday, 12 December 2006 | 14:00 | Finals |

== Results ==
=== Main bracket ===
1/8 finals
Lim Lee Lee (MAS) | 3
Gantömöriin Erdenechimeg (MGL) | 0
Kim Kyung-ju (KOR) | 1
Venera Zhetibay (KAZ) | 3
Marna Pabillore (PHI) | 7
Ha Ryon-bok (PRK) | 1
Amrita Shakya (NEP) | 0
Tomoko Araga (JPN) | 8
Sahar Shaheen (SYR) | 9
Rihab Sawaya (LIB) | 0
Licinia Gomes Amaral (TLS) | 0
Jenny Zeannet (INA) | 7

Quarterfinals
Nour Al-Atari (JOR) | 2
Lim Lee Lee (MAS) | 4
Venera Zhetibay (KAZ) | 1
Marna Pabillore (PHI) | 3
Tomoko Araga (JPN) | 10
Sahar Shaheen (SYR) | 2
Jenny Zeannet (INA) | 7
Rubporn Viriyaphant (THA) | 1

Semifinals
Lim Lee Lee (MAS) | 1
Marna Pabillore (PHI) | 3
Tomoko Araga (JPN) | 7
Jenny Zeannet (INA) | 1

Final
Marna Pabillore (PHI) | 1
Tomoko Araga (JPN) | 9

=== Repechage ===
Repechage 1R
Ha Ryon-bok (PRK) | 3
Venera Zhetibay (KAZ) | 7
Sahar Shaheen (SYR) | 8
Amrita Shakya (NEP) | 0

Final repechage
Lim Lee Lee (MAS) | 3
Venera Zhetibay (KAZ) | 9
Sahar Shaheen (SYR) | 0
Jenny Zeannet (INA) | 7
