= Karate at the 2006 Asian Games – Women's kata =

Karate competition

Women's kata at the 2006 Asian Games
- Venue: Qatar SC Indoor Hall
- Date: 12 December 2006
- Competitors: 15 from 15 nations

Medalists
gold medal	Nao Morooka	Japan
silver medal	Nguyễn Hoàng Ngân	Vietnam
bronze medal	Cheung Pui Si	Macau
bronze medal	Lim Lee Lee	Malaysia

The women's individual kata competition at the 2006 Asian Games in Doha, Qatar was held on 12 December 2006 at the Qatar SC Indoor Hall.

== Schedule ==
All times are Arabia Standard Time (UTC+03:00)

Date	Time	Event
Tuesday, 12 December 2006	09:00	1/8 finals
Tuesday, 12 December 2006	09:00	Quarterfinals
Tuesday, 12 December 2006	09:00	Semifinals
Tuesday, 12 December 2006	09:00	Repechage 1R
Tuesday, 12 December 2006	11:30	Finals

== Results ==
Legend

- K — Won by kiken

=== Main bracket ===
1/8 finals
Nguyễn Hoàng Ngân (VIE)	4
Cheung Pui Si (MAC)	1
Sulochana Sijakhwa (NEP)	4
Ziba Akhtari (AFG)	1
Sanjeewani Ranasinghe (SRI)	K
Haya Samir Jumaa (UAE)
Lim Lee Lee (MAS)	5
Gantömöriin Erdenechimeg (MGL)	0
Nao Morooka (JPN)	5
Nour Al-Atari (JOR)	0
Yanisa Torrattanawathana (THA)	3
Ng Pei Yi (SIN)	2
Huang Yu-chi (TPE)	5
Abrar Abdulsayed (KUW)	0

Quarterfinals
Yip Ching Yee (HKG)	0
Nguyễn Hoàng Ngân (VIE)	5
Sulochana Sijakhwa (NEP)	5
Sanjeewani Ranasinghe (SRI)	0
Lim Lee Lee (MAS)	0
Nao Morooka (JPN)	5
Yanisa Torrattanawathana (THA)	2
Huang Yu-chi (TPE)	3

Semifinals
Nguyễn Hoàng Ngân (VIE)	5
Sulochana Sijakhwa (NEP)	0
Nao Morooka (JPN)	5
Huang Yu-chi (TPE)	0

Final
Nguyễn Hoàng Ngân (VIE)	0
Nao Morooka (JPN)	5

=== Repechage ===
Repechage 1R
Yip Ching Yee (HKG)	0
Cheung Pui Si (MAC)	5
Lim Lee Lee (MAS)	5
Nour Al-Atari (JOR)	0

Final repechage
Sulochana Sijakhwa (NEP)	0
Cheung Pui Si (MAC)	5
Lim Lee Lee (MAS)	5
Huang Yu-chi (TPE)	0
