= Bowling at the 2018 Asian Games – Women's masters =

Women's masters at the 2018 Asian Games
- Venue: Jakabaring Bowling Center
- Date: 26–27 August 2018
- Competitors: 16 from 9 nations

Medalists
gold medal	Mirai Ishimoto	Japan
silver medal	Lee Yeon-ji	South Korea
bronze medal	Lee Na-young	South Korea

The women's masters competition at the 2018 Asian Games in Palembang was held on 26 and 27 August 2018 at Jakabaring Bowling Center.

The Masters event comprises the top 16 bowlers (maximum two per country) from the all-events category. Block 1 were played on long oil pattern lane, while Block 2 were played on medium oil pattern lane.

== Schedule ==
All times are Western Indonesia Time (UTC+07:00)

Date	Time	Event
Sunday, 26 August 2018	13:00	1st block
Monday, 27 August 2018	09:00	2nd block
Monday, 27 August 2018	15:30	Stepladder final round 1
Monday, 27 August 2018	15:30	Stepladder final round 2

== Results ==
=== Preliminary ===
Rank	Athlete	Game																Total
Rank	Athlete	1	2	3	4	5	6	7	8	9	10	11	12	13	14	15	16	Total
1	Mirai Ishimoto (JPN)	254; 10	229; 10	247; 10	233; 10	244; 10	223; 10	254; 10	212; 0	223; 10	267; 10	243; 10	234; 10	231; 0	224; 0	256; 10	244; 10	3948
2	Lee Na-young (KOR)	262; 10	235; 0	234; 10	210; 0	208; 0	192; 0	277; 10	265; 10	245; 0	220; 10	253; 10	244; 0	255; 10	235; 10	208; 10	221; 0	3854
3	Lee Yeon-ji (KOR)	212; 0	222; 0	247; 10	254; 10	219; 10	235; 10	255; 10	242; 10	257; 10	235; 0	217; 10	228; 10	278; 10	191; 0	246; 0	209; 0	3847
4	Joey Yeo (SGP)	233; 10	257; 10	232; 0	263; 10	254; 10	221; 0	201; 0	230; 10	212; 5	267; 10	236; 0	199; 0	230; 10	224; 0	240; 10	243; 10	3837
5	Daphne Tan (SGP)	252; 0	231; 0	232; 10	224; 0	278; 10	223; 10	212; 0	247; 10	222; 0	231; 0	221; 10	250; 10	229; 0	210; 10	231; 0	235; 10	3808
6	Chou Chia-chen (TPE)	234; 0	267; 10	201; 0	263; 10	235; 10	268; 10	204; 0	223; 0	212; 5	200; 0	202; 0	252; 10	226; 10	256; 10	190; 0	245; 10	3763
7	Alexis Sy (PHI)	224; 10	231; 10	250; 10	219; 0	227; 0	219; 10	207; 10	219; 0	242; 10	198; 0	243; 0	193; 5	256; 10	255; 10	245; 10	221; 0	3744
8	Yuri Sato (JPN)	221; 0	225; 10	243; 10	196; 0	243; 10	231; 0	241; 0	217; 0	213; 0	242; 10	266; 10	212; 0	229; 0	233; 10	220; 0	225; 0	3717
9	Yanee Saebe (THA)	232; 10	213; 10	180; 0	180; 0	220; 0	240; 10	207; 10	230; 10	230; 0	254; 10	257; 10	253; 10	246; 10	238; 10	245; 10	179; 0	3714
10	Natasha Roslan (MAS)	207; 0	244; 10	232; 10	197; 10	201; 0	199; 0	229; 0	262; 10	249; 0	245; 10	268; 10	225; 0	188; 0	233; 10	193; 0	243; 10	3695
11	Huang Chiung-yao (TPE)	180; 0	223; 0	212; 0	196; 0	202; 0	198; 0	213; 10	232; 10	254; 10	249; 10	199; 0	234; 10	231; 10	233; 10	254; 10	222; 10	3622
12	Lara Posadas (PHI)	247; 10	206; 0	190; 0	200; 10	264; 0	245; 10	198; 0	223; 10	199; 0	236; 10	262; 0	209; 10	181; 0	223; 0	210; 10	225; 10	3598
13	Tannya Roumimper (INA)	233; 0	209; 0	241; 10	219; 0	212; 10	234; 0	199; 0	245; 0	234; 10	223; 0	220; 0	193; 5	213; 0	246; 0	210; 0	208; 0	3574
14	Syaidatul Afifah (MAS)	235; 10	199; 0	224; 0	211; 10	208; 0	210; 0	246; 10	234; 0	225; 10	230; 0	193; 0	222; 0	223; 0	242; 0	199; 0	203; 0	3544
15	Nadia Pramanik Nuramalina (INA)	216; 0	179; 0	225; 0	256; 10	221; 0	255; 10	196; 0	204; 0	211; 0	231; 0	209; 10	177; 0	232; 10	211; 0	209; 10	223; 0	3505
16	Wong Son Ian (MAC)	243; 10	244; 10	221; 0	181; 0	256; 10	185; 0	247; 10	208; 0	232; 10	180; 0	178; 0	157; 0	245; 0	210; 0	201; 0	231; 10	3479

=== Stepladder finals ===
Stepladder final round 1			Stepladder final round 2
			1	Mirai Ishimoto (JPN)	240	241	481
2	Lee Na-young (KOR)	211	3	Lee Yeon-ji (KOR)	229	244	473
3	Lee Yeon-ji (KOR)	230
