= Karate at the 2006 Asian Games – Men's kumite 55 kg =

Karate competition

Men's kumite 55 kg at the 2006 Asian Games
- Venue: Qatar SC Indoor Hall
- Date: 12 December 2006
- Competitors: 16 from 16 nations

Medalists
gold medal	Hsieh Cheng-kang	Chinese Taipei
silver medal	Puvaneswaran Ramasamy	Malaysia
bronze medal	Thamer Al-Malki	Saudi Arabia
bronze medal	Phạm Trần Nguyên	Vietnam

The men's kumite 55 kilograms competition at the 2006 Asian Games in Doha, Qatar was held on 12 December 2006 at the Qatar SC Indoor Hall.

== Schedule ==
All times are Arabia Standard Time (UTC+03:00)

Date	Time	Event
Tuesday, 12 December 2006	14:00	1/8 finals
Tuesday, 12 December 2006	14:00	Quarterfinals
Tuesday, 12 December 2006	14:00	Semifinals
Tuesday, 12 December 2006	14:00	Repechage 1R
Tuesday, 12 December 2006	14:00	Finals

== Results ==
Legend

- K — Won by kiken (8–0)

=== Main bracket ===
1/8 finals
Vimukthi Gunarathna (SRI)	0
Hsieh Cheng-kang (TPE)	3
Thamer Al-Malki (KSA)	7
Jaime Godinho Soares (TLS)	0
Mohammed Mohammed (YEM)	0
Ikhtiyor Sharapov (UZB)	8
Irineo Toribio (PHI)	4
Inthanousone Vilaysouk (LAO)	0
Bambang Maulidin (INA)	6
Shaker Al-Mawali (BRN)	0
Ram Limbu (NEP)	5
Alijon Sarimasqov (TJK)	7
Hj Eddie Jofriani Hj Johari (BRU)	5
Saadi Abbas Jalbani (PAK)	3
Puvaneswaran Ramasamy (MAS)	4
Phạm Trần Nguyên (VIE)	3

Quarterfinals
Hsieh Cheng-kang (TPE)	5
Thamer Al-Malki (KSA)	1
Ikhtiyor Sharapov (UZB)	1
Irineo Toribio (PHI)	0
Bambang Maulidin (INA)	3
Alijon Sarimasqov (TJK)	1
Hj Eddie Jofriani Hj Johari (BRU)	3
Puvaneswaran Ramasamy (MAS)	4

Semifinals
Hsieh Cheng-kang (TPE)	5
Ikhtiyor Sharapov (UZB)	1
Bambang Maulidin (INA)
Puvaneswaran Ramasamy (MAS)	K

Final
Hsieh Cheng-kang (TPE)	3
Puvaneswaran Ramasamy (MAS)	2

=== Repechage ===
Repechage 1R
Vimukthi Gunarathna (SRI)
Thamer Al-Malki (KSA)	K
Hj Eddie Jofriani Hj Johari (BRU)	1
Phạm Trần Nguyên (VIE)	7

Final repechage
Ikhtiyor Sharapov (UZB)	1
Thamer Al-Malki (KSA)	3
Phạm Trần Nguyên (VIE)	K
Bambang Maulidin (INA)
