= Karate at the 2006 Asian Games – Women's kumite 60 kg =

Karate competition

Women's kumite 60 kg at the 2006 Asian Games
- Venue: Qatar SC Indoor Hall
- Date: 13 December 2006
- Competitors: 11 from 11 nations

Medalists
gold medal	Yuka Sato	Japan
silver medal	Nguyễn Thị Hải Yến	Vietnam
bronze medal	Chan Ka Man	Hong Kong
bronze medal	Yamini Gopalasamy	Malaysia

The women's kumite 60 kilograms competition at the 2006 Asian Games in Doha, Qatar was held on 13 December 2006 at the Qatar SC Indoor Hall.

A total of eleven competitors from eleven countries competed in this event, limited to fighters whose body weight was less than 60 kilograms.

Yuka Sato of Japan won the gold medal.

== Schedule ==
All times are Arabia Standard Time (UTC+03:00)

Date	Time	Event
Wednesday, 13 December 2006	13:00	1/8 finals
Wednesday, 13 December 2006	13:00	Quarterfinals
Wednesday, 13 December 2006	13:00	Semifinals
Wednesday, 13 December 2006	13:00	Finals

== Results ==
=== Main bracket ===
1/8 finals
Chan Ka Man (HKG)	7
Huang Yu-chi (TPE)	1
Yanisa Torrattanawathana (THA)	5
Puspa Meonk (INA)	0
Souzan Amer (SYR)	0
Yamini Gopalasamy (MAS)	8

Quarterfinals
Choi Cho-rong (KOR)	3
Nguyễn Thị Hải Yến (VIE)	5
Chan Ka Man (HKG)	5
Lkhagvasürengiin Pürevdulam (MGL)	0
Sara El-Zein (LIB)	0
Yanisa Torrattanawathana (THA)	4
Yamini Gopalasamy (MAS)	1
Yuka Sato (JPN)	9

Semifinals
Nguyễn Thị Hải Yến (VIE)	2
Chan Ka Man (HKG)	1
Yanisa Torrattanawathana (THA)	1
Yuka Sato (JPN)	5

Final
Nguyễn Thị Hải Yến (VIE)	2
Yuka Sato (JPN)	6

=== Repechage ===
Final repechage
Chan Ka Man (HKG)	3
Choi Cho-rong (KOR)	1
Yamini Gopalasamy (MAS)	4
Yanisa Torrattanawathana (THA)	3
