= Christina Mak =

Hong Kong squash player (born 1978)

Personal information
- Born: Mak Pui Hin; March 6, 1978 (age 48) Guangdong, People's Republic of China

Sport
- Country: Hong Kong
- Handedness: Right Handed
- Turned pro: 1996
- Coached by: Tony Choi

Women's singles
- Highest ranking: 31 (July, 2007)
- Current ranking: 39 (May, 2009)
Medal record
Women's Squash
Asian Games
Bronze medal – third place	2006 Doha	Individual
- Updated on May 15, 2009

Mak Pui Hin (Chinese: 麥珮軒; Jyutping: mak^{6} pui^{3} hin^{1}; born 6 March 1978) is a Hong Kong squash player. She won a bronze medal at the 2006 Asian Games in the women's squash singles event.
