= Yang Hee-chun =

South Korean cyclist

Personal information
- Born: 8 December 1982 (age 43)

Cycling career
- Sport: Cycling

Yang Hee-chun (born 8 December 1982) is a South Korean cyclist. He competed in two events at the 2004 Summer Olympics.
