= Chinatsu Matsui =

Japanese squash player (born 1977)

Personal information
- Born: August 8, 1977 (age 48) Kawasaki, Japan

Sport
- Country: Japan
- Handedness: Left Handed
- Turned pro: 2001
- Coached by: Yoshihiro Watanabe
- Racquet used: Head

Women's singles
- Highest ranking: No. 50 (September, 2007)
- Title: 1
- Tour final: 4
- Updated on August, 2013

Chinatsu Matsui (松井千夏, Matsui Chinatsu; born 8 August 1977 in Kawasaki) is a professional squash player who represents Japan. She reached a career-high world ranking of World No. 50 in September 2007.
