= Kang Dong-jin =

South Korean cyclist (born 1987)

Personal information
- Born: 23 December 1987 (age 38)

Cycling career
- Sport: Cycling
- Role: Rider

Kang Dong-jin (Korean: 강동진, Korean pronunciation: [kaŋ.doŋ.dʑin] or [kaŋ] [toŋ.dʑin]; born 23 December 1987) is a South Korean professional racing cyclist. He rode at the 2015 UCI Track Cycling World Championships. He competed at the 2006 and 2014 Asian Games.

In 2010 he was suspended for two years after he failed a drug test for methyltestosterone doping.
