= Elizabeth Jimie =

Malaysian swimmer

Personal information
- Nationality: Malaysia
- Born: 28 June 1992 (age 34) Kuching, Sarawak, Malaysia
- Height: 1.62 m (5 ft 4 in)
- Weight: 59 kg (130 lb)

Sport
- Sport: Diving
- Event: Springboard
- Partner: Leong Mun Yee
Medal record
Women's diving
Representing Malaysia
Asian Games
Bronze medal – third place	2006 Doha	1 m springboard
Bronze medal – third place	2006 Doha	3 m spring synchro
Southeast Asian Games
Gold medal – first place	2007 Bangkok	3 m spring synchro
Bronze medal – third place	2007 Bangkok	1 m springboard

Elizabeth Jimie (born 28 June 1992 in Kuching, Sarawak) is a Malaysian diver, who specialised in individual and synchronised springboard events. She won the gold medal, along with her partner Leong Mun Yee, in the women's 3 m synchronised springboard event, and added the bronze for the 1 m springboard at the 2007 Southeast Asian Games in Bangkok, Thailand. She is also a two-time bronze medalist at the 2006 Asian Games in Doha, Qatar.

Jimie qualified for the women's 3 m individual springboard event at the 2008 Summer Olympics in Beijing, after finishing fifth in the Olympic test event. She finished twenty-first in the preliminary rounds of the competition, with a score of 253.50 points, tying a position with her diving partner Leung Mun Yee.
