= Macau at the 2006 Asian Games =

- IOC code: MAC
- NOC: Macau Sports and Olympic Committee

in Doha
- Flag bearer: Han Jing
- Medals Ranked 30th: Gold 0 Silver 1 Bronze 6 Total 7

Asian Games appearances (overview)
- 1990; 1994; 1998; 2002; 2006; 2010; 2014; 2018; 2022; 2026

Macau participated in the 15th Asian Games, officially known as the XV Asiad held in Doha from 1 to 15 December 2006. Macau ranked 30th with a lone silver medal and 6 bronze medals in this edition of the Asiad.

== Medalists ==
Medal	Name	Sport	Event	Date
Silver	Jia Rui	Wushu	Men's changquan	14
Bronze	Chong Ka Lap	Bodybuilding	Men's 65 kg	8
Bronze	Cheung Pui Si	Karate	Women's kata	12
Bronze	Paula Carion	Karate	Women's kumite +60 kg	13
Bronze	Qin Zhi Jian	Wushu	Men's sanda 60 kg	14
Bronze	Cai Liang Chan	Wushu	Men's sanda 65 kg	14
Bronze	Han Jing	Wushu	Women's changquan	14
