= Bowling at the 2014 Asian Games =

- Venue: Anyang Hogye Gymnasium
- Dates: 23 September – 2 October 2014
- Competitors: 177 from 19 nations

Bowling at the 2014 Asian Games was held in Incheon, South Korea from September 23 to October 2, 2014.

== Schedule ==
| ● | Round | ● | Last round | P | Preliminary | F | Final |

| Event↓/Date → | 23rd Tue | 24th Wed | 25th Thu | 26th Fri | 27th Sat | 28th Sun | 29th Mon | 30th Tue | 1st Wed | 2nd Thu | |
|---|---|---|---|---|---|---|---|---|---|---|---|
| Men's singles | ● | | | | | | | | | | |
| Men's doubles | | | ● | | | | | | | | |
| Men's trios | | | | | ● | ● | | | | | |
| Men's team of 5 | | | | | | | ● | ● | | | |
| Men's all-events | ● | | ● | | ● | ● | ● | ● | | | |
| Men's masters | | | | | | | | | P | P | F |
| Women's singles | | ● | | | | | | | | | |
| Women's doubles | | | | ● | | | | | | | |
| Women's trios | | | | | ● | ● | | | | | |
| Women's team of 5 | | | | | | | ● | ● | | | |
| Women's all-events | | ● | | ● | ● | ● | ● | ● | | | |
| Women's masters | | | | | | | | | P | P | F |

== Medalists ==
=== Men ===
| Event | Gold | Silver | Bronze |
|---|---|---|---|
| Singles | Yannaphon Larpapharat; Thailand | Du Jianchao; China | Sithiphol Kunaksorn; Thailand |
| Doubles | Japan; Toshihiko Takahashi; Yoshinao Masatoki | Japan; Tomoyuki Sasaki; Daisuke Yoshida | Indonesia; Billy Muhammad Islam; Hardy Rachmadian |
| Trios | Japan; Tomoyuki Sasaki; Shogo Wada; Shusaku Asato | Malaysia; Syafiq Ridhwan; Timmy Tan; Zulmazran Zulkifli | South Korea; Kim Kyung-min; Park Jong-woo; Choi Bok-eum |
| Team of 5 | South Korea; Park Jong-woo; Choi Bok-eum; Kim Kyung-min; Shin Seung-hyeon; Kang Hee-won; Hong Hae-sol | Malaysia; Syafiq Ridhwan; Adrian Ang; Timmy Tan; Zulmazran Zulkifli; Alex Liew; Muhammad Rafiq Ismail | Hong Kong; Wicky Yeung; Kam Siu Lun; Eric Tseng; Wu Siu Hong; Michael Mak; Chan Yat Long |
| All-events | Park Jong-woo; South Korea | Yannaphon Larpapharat; Thailand | Kang Hee-won; South Korea |
| Masters | Park Jong-woo; South Korea | Wu Siu Hong; Hong Kong | Shaker Ali Al-Hassan; United Arab Emirates |

=== Women ===
| Event | Gold | Silver | Bronze |
|---|---|---|---|
| Singles | Chou Chia-chen; Chinese Taipei | Jazreel Tan; Singapore | Lee Na-young; South Korea |
| Doubles | South Korea; Lee Na-young; Son Yun-hee | Malaysia; Jane Sin; Shalin Zulkifli | South Korea; Lee Yeong-seung; Jung Da-wun |
| Trios | South Korea; Lee Na-young; Jung Da-wun; Son Yun-hee | Singapore; Cherie Tan; New Hui Fen; Jazreel Tan | South Korea; Lee Yeong-seung; Jeon Eun-hee; Kim Jin-sun |
| Team of 5 | Singapore; Cherie Tan; Daphne Tan; Shayna Ng; New Hui Fen; Jazreel Tan; Joey Yeo | South Korea; Lee Na-young; Jung Da-wun; Kim Jin-sun; Son Yun-hee; Jeon Eun-hee; Lee Yeong-seung | Indonesia; Tannya Roumimper; Novie Phang; Alisha Nabila Larasati; Sharon Limansantoso; Putty Armein; Cheya Chantika |
| All-events | Lee Na-young; South Korea | Jane Sin; Malaysia | Jazreel Tan; Singapore |
| Masters | Lee Na-young; South Korea | Wang Ya-ting; Chinese Taipei | Son Yun-hee; South Korea |

== Medal table ==
| Rank | Nation | Gold | Silver | Bronze | Total |
|---|---|---|---|---|---|
| 1 | South Korea (KOR) | 7 | 1 | 6 | 14 |
| 2 | Japan (JPN) | 2 | 1 | 0 | 3 |
| 3 | Singapore (SIN) | 1 | 2 | 1 | 4 |
| 4 | Thailand (THA) | 1 | 1 | 1 | 3 |
| 5 | Chinese Taipei (TPE) | 1 | 1 | 0 | 2 |
| 6 | Malaysia (MAS) | 0 | 4 | 0 | 4 |
| 7 | Hong Kong (HKG) | 0 | 1 | 1 | 2 |
| 8 | China (CHN) | 0 | 1 | 0 | 1 |
| 9 | Indonesia (INA) | 0 | 0 | 2 | 2 |
| 10 | United Arab Emirates (UAE) | 0 | 0 | 1 | 1 |
| Totals (10 entries) | | 12 | 12 | 12 | 36 |

== Participating nations ==
A total of 177 athletes from 19 nations competed in bowling at the 2014 Asian Games:

- China (12)
- Chinese Taipei (6)
- Hong Kong (10)
- Indonesia (12)
- Japan (12)
- Kuwait (12)
- Macau (12)
- Malaysia (12)
- Mongolia (10)
- Philippines (12)
- Qatar (6)
- Saudi Arabia (6)
- Singapore (12)
- South Korea (12)
- Thailand (10)
- United Arab Emirates (6)
- Uzbekistan (6)
- Vietnam (6)
- Yemen (3)
