= Bowling at the 2014 Asian Games – Women's all-events =

Women's all-events at the 2014 Asian Games
- Venue: Anyang Hogye Gymnasium
- Date: 24–30 September 2014
- Competitors: 74 from 14 nations

Medalists
| gold medal | Lee Na-young | South Korea |
| silver medal | Jane Sin | Malaysia |
| bronze medal | Jazreel Tan | Singapore |

The women's all-events competition at the 2014 Asian Games in Incheon was held from 24 to 30 September 2014 at Anyang Hogye Gymnasium.

All-events scores are compiled by totaling series scores from the singles, doubles, trios and team competitions.

== Schedule ==
All times are Korea Standard Time (UTC+09:00)

| Date | Time | Event |
|---|---|---|
| Wednesday, 24 September 2014 | 09:00 | Singles |
| Friday, 26 September 2014 | 09:00 | Doubles |
| Saturday, 27 September 2014 | 18:00 | Trios – 1st block |
| Sunday, 28 September 2014 | 09:00 | Trios – 2nd block |
| Monday, 29 September 2014 | 15:00 | Team – 1st block |
| Tuesday, 30 September 2014 | 09:00 | Team – 2nd block |

== Results ==
| Rank | Athlete | Singles | Doubles | Trios | Team | Total |
|---|---|---|---|---|---|---|
| 1st place, gold medalist(s) | Lee Na-young (KOR) | 1272 | 1243 | 1361 | 1256 | 5132 |
| 2nd place, silver medalist(s) | Jane Sin (MAS) | 1232 | 1289 | 1380 | 1194 | 5095 |
| 3rd place, bronze medalist(s) | Jazreel Tan (SIN) | 1277 | 1223 | 1251 | 1262 | 5013 |
| 4 | Son Yun-hee (KOR) | 1237 | 1310 | 1268 | 1178 | 4993 |
| 5 | Cherie Tan (SIN) | 1219 | 1250 | 1323 | 1166 | 4958 |
| 6 | Lee Yeong-seung (KOR) | 1236 | 1224 | 1196 | 1286 | 4942 |
| 7 | Jung Da-wun (KOR) | 1234 | 1238 | 1267 | 1193 | 4932 |
| 8 | Yang Suiling (CHN) | 1250 | 1292 | 1190 | 1177 | 4909 |
| 9 | Kim Jin-sun (KOR) | 1219 | 1186 | 1295 | 1202 | 4902 |
| 10 | New Hui Fen (SIN) | 1271 | 1224 | 1179 | 1209 | 4883 |
| 11 | Zhang Yuhong (CHN) | 1254 | 1073 | 1238 | 1270 | 4835 |
| 12 | Sharon Limansantoso (INA) | 1246 | 1241 | 1198 | 1141 | 4826 |
| 13 | Shayna Ng (SIN) | 1159 | 1174 | 1191 | 1269 | 4793 |
| 14 | Daphne Tan (SIN) | 1239 | 1102 | 1234 | 1213 | 4788 |
| 15 | Putty Armein (INA) | 1225 | 1192 | 1255 | 1113 | 4785 |
| 16 | Shalin Zulkifli (MAS) | 1126 | 1229 | 1231 | 1191 | 4777 |
| 17 | Haruka Matsuda (JPN) | 1225 | 1183 | 1184 | 1174 | 4766 |
| 18 | Tannya Roumimper (INA) | 1110 | 1188 | 1231 | 1213 | 4742 |
| 19 | Chou Chia-chen (TPE) | 1291 | 1221 | 1106 | 1110 | 4728 |
| 20 | Wang Ya-ting (TPE) | 1204 | 1240 | 1130 | 1148 | 4722 |
| 21 | Pan Yu-fen (TPE) | 1177 | 1068 | 1310 | 1160 | 4715 |
| 22 | Chan Shuk Han (HKG) | 1176 | 1134 | 1177 | 1213 | 4700 |
| 23 | Tsai Hsin-yi (TPE) | 1202 | 1071 | 1203 | 1223 | 4699 |
| 24 | Angkana Netrviseth (THA) | 1149 | 1196 | 1193 | 1155 | 4693 |
| 25 | Alexis Sy (PHI) | 1128 | 1160 | 1172 | 1214 | 4674 |
| 26 | Joey Yeo (SIN) | 1205 | 1058 | 1214 | 1196 | 4673 |
| 27 | Syaidatul Afifah (MAS) | 1204 | 1216 | 1168 | 1076 | 4664 |
| 28 | Chien Hsiu-lan (TPE) | 1177 | 1157 | 1154 | 1175 | 4663 |
| 29 | Misaki Mukotani (JPN) | 1114 | 1180 | 1203 | 1154 | 4651 |
| 30 | Hee Kar Yen (MAS) | 1184 | 1203 | 1094 | 1164 | 4645 |
| 31 | Liza Clutario (PHI) | 1102 | 1209 | 1138 | 1195 | 4644 |
| 32 | Natsuki Teshima (JPN) | 1176 | 1151 | 1147 | 1169 | 4643 |
| 33 | Jeon Eun-hee (KOR) | 1107 | 1182 | 1201 | 1150 | 4640 |
| 34 | Liza del Rosario (PHI) | 1150 | 1139 | 1191 | 1140 | 4620 |
| 34 | Siti Safiyah (MAS) | 1198 | 1148 | 1106 | 1168 | 4620 |
| 36 | Zhang Chunli (CHN) | 1099 | 1172 | 1197 | 1140 | 4608 |
| 37 | Kanako Ishimine (JPN) | 1068 | 1172 | 1206 | 1159 | 4605 |
| 38 | Lara Posadas (PHI) | 1158 | 1135 | 1155 | 1144 | 4592 |
| 39 | Hikaru Takekawa (JPN) | 1073 | 1157 | 1172 | 1188 | 4590 |
| 40 | Korngunya Aree (THA) | 1106 | 1200 | 1138 | 1142 | 4586 |
| 41 | Chang Yu-hsuan (TPE) | 1222 | 1087 | 1150 | 1108 | 4567 |
| 42 | Kong Min (CHN) | 1172 | 1118 | 1114 | 1146 | 4550 |
| 43 | Mitsuki Okamoto (JPN) | 1157 | 1133 | 1129 | 1096 | 4515 |
| 44 | Esther Cheah (MAS) | 1255 | 1087 | 1050 | 1115 | 4507 |
| 45 | Novie Phang (INA) | 1180 | 1118 | 1001 | 1201 | 4500 |
| 46 | Sun Hongdou (CHN) | 1048 | 1121 | 1166 | 1133 | 4468 |
| 47 | Alisha Nabila Larasati (INA) | 1067 | 1131 | 1073 | 1172 | 4443 |
| 48 | Arpakorn Netrviseth (THA) | 1096 | 1110 | 1136 | 1090 | 4432 |
| 49 | Hui Tong (MAC) | 1047 | 1157 | 1058 | 1165 | 4427 |
| 50 | Julia Lam (MAC) | 1042 | 1153 | 1089 | 1135 | 4419 |
| 51 | Filomena Choi (MAC) | 1051 | 1118 | 1151 | 1089 | 4409 |
| 52 | Krizziah Tabora (PHI) | 1067 | 1013 | 1229 | 1094 | 4403 |
| 53 | Tanaprang Sathean (THA) | 1062 | 998 | 1158 | 1182 | 4400 |
| 54 | Milki Ng (HKG) | 1174 | 1087 | 1126 | 993 | 4380 |
| 55 | Li Ling (CHN) | 1095 | 1149 | 1065 | 1031 | 4340 |
| 56 | Ku Sok Va (MAC) | 1088 | 1013 | 1037 | 1118 | 4256 |
| 57 | Kritsanakorn Sangaroon (THA) | 1136 | 1068 | 1071 | 966 | 4241 |
| 58 | Zoe Tam (HKG) | 986 | 1127 | 1070 | 1036 | 4219 |
| 59 | Joan Cheng (HKG) | 1122 | 1009 | 980 | 1051 | 4162 |
| 60 | Anne Marie Kiac (PHI) | 1060 | 1006 | 1026 | 1059 | 4151 |
| 61 | Cheya Chantika (INA) | 1059 | 1009 | 1003 | 1068 | 4139 |
| 62 | Veronica de Souza (MAC) | 1050 | 995 | 1078 | 980 | 4103 |
| 63 | Au Man Wai (MAC) | 998 | 967 | 971 | 966 | 3902 |
| 64 | Khalzangiin Ölziikhorol (MGL) | 934 | 956 | 974 | 973 | 3837 |
| 65 | Fatima Mohammad (KUW) | 904 | 1035 | 813 | 994 | 3746 |
| 66 | Samdangiin Delgertsetseg (MGL) | 940 | 982 | 876 | 938 | 3736 |
| 67 | Shaikha Al-Hendi (KUW) | 922 | 869 | 888 | 881 | 3560 |
| 68 | Terveegiin Dorjderem (MGL) | 878 | 843 | 948 | 881 | 3550 |
| 69 | Altaf Karam (KUW) | 894 | 772 | 875 | 862 | 3403 |
| 70 | Luvsandagvyn Tsetsegsüren (MGL) | 875 | 757 | 848 | 904 | 3384 |
| 71 | Maleha Al-Azzani (YEM) | 922 | 748 | 764 | 870 | 3304 |
| 72 | Hessah Al-Juraied (KUW) | 832 | 822 | 775 | 752 | 3181 |
| 73 | Rawan Al-Omani (KUW) | 775 | 666 | 748 | 803 | 2992 |
| 74 | Aseel Mohammad (KUW) | 813 | 0 | 0 | 806 | 1619 |
