= Malaysia at the 2014 Asian Games =

- IOC code: MAS
- NOC: Olympic Council of Malaysia
- Website: www.olympic.org.my (in English)

in Incheon
- Competitors: 277 in 28 sports
- Flag bearer: Nicol David
- Officials: 140
- Medals Ranked 14th: Gold 5 Silver 14 Bronze 14 Total 33

Asian Games appearances (overview)
- 1954; 1958; 1962; 1966; 1970; 1974; 1978; 1982; 1986; 1990; 1994; 1998; 2002; 2006; 2010; 2014; 2018; 2022; 2026

Other related appearances
- North Borneo (1954, 1958, 1962); Sarawak (1962)

Malaysia participated in the 2014 Asian Games in Incheon, South Korea from 19 September to 4 October 2014. Danyal Balagopal Abdullah was the chief of the delegation.

== Media coverage ==
Malaysian satellite television provider Astro and Media Prima Group private broadcasters TV3 (Sistem Televisyen Malaysia Berhad) and TV9 (Ch-9 Media Sdn Bhd) held the broadcast rights of the 2014 Asian Games in the country. The latter two replaced Radio Televisyen Malaysia (last broadcast the 2010 edition) as the free-to-air right holders for the event. It was the only such case in Malaysian sports telecast, as Radio Televisyen Malaysia would later return to hold the free-to-air broadcast rights in 2018. Astro was also one of the production teams for host broadcaster Incheon Asian Games Host Broadcasting Management.

== Medal summary ==
=== Medal table ===
Sport	Gold	Silver	Bronze	Total
Squash	2	2	1	5
Karate	2	0	2	4
Sailing	1	2	0	3
Bowling	0	4	0	4
Diving	0	2	3	5
Shooting	0	2	1	3
Cycling	0	1	1	2
Archery	0	1	0	1
Badminton	0	0	4	4
Sepaktakraw	0	0	2	2
Totals (10 entries)	5	14	14	33

=== Multiple medalists ===
Malaysian competitors that have won at least two medals.

Name	Sport	Gold	Silver	Bronze	Total	Rank
Nicol David	Squash	2			2	28
Low Wee Wern	Squash	1	1		2	101
Muhamad Syafiq Ridhwan Abdul Malek	Bowling		2		2	244
Sin Li Jane	Bowling		2		2	244
Tan Chye Chern	Bowling		2		2	244
Zulmazran Zulkifli	Bowling		2		2	244
Cheong Jun Hoong	Diving		1	1	2	284
Nur Suryani Mohamed Taibi	Shooting		1	1	2	284
Ong Beng Hee	Squash		1	1	2	284
Ooi Tze Liang	Diving		1	1	2	284
Ahmad Aizat Mohd Nor Azmi	Sepaktakraw			2	2	351
Goh V Shem	Badminton			2	2	351
Lee Chong Wei	Badminton			2	2	351
Mohd Fadzli Muhd Roslan	Sepaktakraw			2	2	351
Mohd Syahir Mohd Rosdi	Sepaktakraw			2	2	351
Mohd Syazreenqamar Salehan	Sepaktakraw			2	2	351
Mohd Zamree Mohd Dahan	Sepaktakraw			2	2	351
Tan Wee Kiong	Badminton			2	2	351

=== Medalists ===
Medal	Name	Sport	Event	Date
Gold	Nicol David	Squash	Women's singles	23 September
Gold	Delia Arnold; Low Wee Wern; Nicol David; Vanessa Raj	Squash	Women's team	27 September
Gold	Ahmad Syukri Abdul Aziz; Mohamad Faizal Norizan	Sailing	Men's two person dinghy 420	30 September
Gold	Lim Chee Wei	Karate	Men's individual kata	2 October
Gold	Syakilla Salni Jefry Krisnan	Karate	Women's kumite 61 kg	3 October
Silver	Fatehah Mustapa	Cycling	Women's keirin	21 September
Silver	Low Wee Wern	Squash	Women's singles	23 September
Silver	Nur Suryani Mohamed Taibi	Shooting	Women's 50 metre rifle prone	24 September
Silver	Muhammad Ezuan Nasir Khan	Shooting	Men's 50 metre rifle prone	25 September
Silver	Shalin Zulkifli; Sin Li Jane	Bowling	Women's doubles	26 September
Silver	Ivan Yuen; Mohd Azlan Iskandar; Mohd Nafiizwan Adnan; Ong Beng Hee	Squash	Men's team	27 September
Silver	Atiq Bazil Bakri; Haziq Kamaruddin; Khairul Anuar Mohamad; Muhammad Ikram Joni	Archery	Men's team recurve	28 September
Silver	Muhamad Syafiq Ridhwan Abdul Malek; Tan Chye Chern; Zulmazran Zulkifli	Bowling	Men's trios	28 September
Silver	Cheong Jun Hoong; Ng Yan Yee	Diving	Women's synchronized 3 metre springboard	29 September
Silver	Sin Li Jane	Bowling	Women's all events	30 September
Silver	Ahmad Amsyar Azman; Ooi Tze Liang	Diving	Men's synchronized 3 metre springboard	30 September
Silver	Adrian Ang Hsien Loong; Alex Liew Kien Liang; Muhd Rafiq Ismail; Muhamad Syafiq Ridhwan Abdul Malek; Tan Chye Chern; Zulmazran Zulkifli	Bowling	Men's team	30 September
Silver	Khairulnizam Afendy	Sailing	Men's one person dinghy laser	30 September
Silver	Nuraisyah Jamil; Umi Norwahida Sallahuddin	Sailing	Women's two person dinghy 420	30 September
Bronze	Chan Peng Soon; Chong Wei Feng; Goh Soon Huat; Goh V Shem; Hoon Thien How; Iskandar Zulkarnain Zainuddin; Lee Chong Wei; Lim Khim Wah; Tan Boon Heong; Tan Wee Kiong	Badminton	Men's team	22 September
Bronze	Ong Beng Hee	Squash	Men's singles	22 September
Bronze	Muslifah Zulkifli; Nur Ayuni Farhana Abdul Halim; Nur Suryani Mohamed Taibi	Shooting	Women's 50 metre rifle prone team	24 September
Bronze	Josiah Ng	Cycling	Men's keirin	25 September
Bronze	Amirul Zazwan Amir; Ahmad Aizat Mohd Nor Azmi; Izurin Refin; Mohd Fadzli Muhd Roslan; Mohd Helmi Ismail; Mohd Kamal Alfiza Syafie; Mohd Muqlis Borhan; Mohd Syahir Mohd Rosdi; Mohd Syazreenqamar Salehan; Mohd Zamree Mohd Dahan; Muhd Idham Sulaiman; Zulfendi Sumari	Sepaktakraw	Men's team	26 September
Bronze	Vivian Hoo Kah Mun; Woon Khe Wei	Badminton	Women's doubles	26 September
Bronze	Goh V Shem; Tan Wee Kiong	Badminton	Men's doubles	27 September
Bronze	Lee Chong Wei	Badminton	Men's singles	28 September
Bronze	Chew Yi Wei; Ooi Tze Liang	Diving	Men's synchronized 10 metre platform	29 September
Bronze	Leong Mun Yee; Pandelela Rinong	Diving	Women's synchronized 10 metre platform	30 September
Bronze	Ahmad Aizat Mohd Nor Azmi; Mohd Fadzli Muhd Roslan; Mohd Syahir Mohd Rosdi; Mohd Syazreenqamar Salehan; Mohd Zamree Mohd Dahan	Sepaktakraw	Men's regu	2 October
Bronze	Senthil Kumaran Silvarajoo	Karate	Men's kumite 55 kg	3 October
Bronze	Cheong Jun Hoong	Diving	Women's 3 metre springboard	3 October
Bronze	Shree Sharmini Segaran	Karate	Women's kumite 68 kg	3 October

== Aquatics ==
=== Diving ===
Men

Athlete	Event	Preliminary		Final	
Athlete	Event	Score	Rank	Score	Rank
Ahmad Amsyar Azman	1 m springboard	—N/a		352.75	6
Ooi Tze Liang	1 m springboard	—N/a		356.70	5
Ahmad Amsyar Azman	3 m springboard	417.90	5 Q	402.85	8
Ooi Tze Liang	3 m springboard	407.90	6 Q	425.15	7
Chew Yi Wei	10 m platform	326.50	10 Q	406.60	8
Ooi Tze Liang	10 m platform	437.45	4 Q	414.00	7
Ahmad Amsyar Azman; Ooi Tze Liang	3 m synchronized springboard	—N/a		405.81	2nd place, silver medalist(s)
Chew Yi Wei; Ooi Tze Liang	10 m synchronized platform	—N/a		384.90	3rd place, bronze medalist(s)

Women

Athlete	Event	Preliminary		Final	
Athlete	Event	Score	Rank	Score	Rank
Cheong Jun Hoong	1 m springboard	—N/a		257.75	5
Nur Dhabitah Sabri	1 m springboard	—N/a		254.40	6
Cheong Jun Hoong	3 m springboard	—N/a		327.10	3rd place, bronze medalist(s)
Ng Yan Yee	3 m springboard	—N/a		287.80	5
Loh Zhiayi	10 m platform	—N/a		321.00	4
Pandelela Rinong	10 m platform	—N/a		309.35	7
Cheong Jun Hoong; Ng Yan Yee	3 m synchronized springboard	—N/a		287.70	2nd place, silver medalist(s)
Leong Mun Yee; Pandelela Rinong	10 m synchronized platform	—N/a		313.92	3rd place, bronze medalist(s)

=== Swimming ===
Men

Athlete	Event	Heats		Final	
Athlete	Event	Time	Overall rank	Time	Rank
Alwyn Tan Yean Yang	50 m freestyle	23.55	15	Did not advance	
Alwyn Tan Yean Yang	100 m freestyle	51.47	15	Did not advance	
Welson Sim Wee Sheng	200 m freestyle	1:52.47	12	Did not advance	
Kevin Yeap Soon Choy	400 m freestyle	3:56.85	6 Q	3:55.52	7
Vernon Lee Jeau Zhi	400 m freestyle	3:58.27	8 Q	3:57.29	8
Kevin Yeap Soon Choy	1500 m freestyle	—N/a		15:31.67	6
Welson Sim Wee Sheng	1500 m freestyle	—N/a		15:43.04	10

Women

Athlete	Event	Heats		Final	
Athlete	Event	Time	Overall rank	Time	Rank
Chui Lai Kwan	50 m freestyle	26.39	12	Did not advance	
Chui Lai Kwan	100 m freestyle	58.78	15	Did not advance	
Khoo Cai Lin	400 m freestyle	4:18.07	8 Q	4:18.13	6
Khoo Cai Lin	800 m freestyle	—N/a		8:53.51	8

=== Synchronised swimming ===
Women

Athlete	Event	Technical routine		Free routine		Total points	Rank
Athlete	Event	Score	Rank	Score	Rank	Total points	Rank
Katrina Ann Abdul Hadi; Tasha Jane Taher Ali; Zyanne Lee Zhien Huey	Duet	73.4241	7	74.8333	7	148.2574	7

== Archery ==
Malaysia won its first medal in archery in Asian Games history through the trio of Khairul Anuar Mohamad, Haziq Kamaruddin and Atiq Bazil Bakri in the men's recurve team event.

Men's recurve

Athlete	Event	Qualification		1/32 elimination	1/16 elimination	1/8 elimination	1/4 elimination	1/2 elimination	Final	Rank
Athlete	Event	Score	Seed	Opposition Score	Opposition Score	Opposition Score	Opposition Score	Opposition Score	Opposition Score	Rank
Atiq Bazil Bakri	Individual	1312	16 Q	Bye	Ganzorig Myagmardorj (MGL); W 6 – 4; 28-26, 28–27, 27-28, 26–28, 27-26	Hideki Kikuchi (JPN); L 1 – 7; 26-29, 28-28, 28-29, 25-28	Did not advance			
Haziq Kamaruddin	Individual	1299	23	Did not advance						
Khairul Anuar Mohamad	Individual	1344	6 Q	Bye	Ali Ahmed Salem (QAT); W 6 – 2; 27-28, 29–26, 27–24, 27-18	Jayanta Talukdar (IND); W 7 – 1; 30-29, 28–27, 28-28, 29-26	Hideki Kikuchi (JPN); L 5 – 6; 27-28, 30–28, 28-28, 28–27, 27-28, T10-T10*	Did not advance		
Muhammad Ikram Joni	Individual	1280	31	Did not advance						
Atiq Bazil Bakri; Haziq Kamaruddin; Khairul Anuar Mohamad	Team	3955	3 Q	—N/a		Nepal; W 5 – 1; 52-52, 52–47, 56-51	Hong Kong; W 6 – 0; 57-51, 55–54, 54-49	Japan; W 5 – 1; 59-56, 54–53, 54-54	Gold medal match China; L 0 – 6; 54-57, 53–57, 57-58	2nd place, silver medalist(s)

Men's compound

Athlete	Event	Qualification		1/32 elimination	1/16 elimination	1/8 elimination	1/4 elimination	1/2 elimination	Final	Rank
Athlete	Event	Score	Seed	Opposition Score	Opposition Score	Opposition Score	Opposition Score	Opposition Score	Opposition Score	Rank
Lee Kin Lip	Individual	677	28	Did not advance						
Mohd Juwaidi Mazuki	Individual	685	23 Q	Bye	Eshaq Ibrahim Mahammed Al Daghman (IRQ); L 141 – 144; 28-28, 27–28, 29-30, 29-29, 28-29	Did not advance				
Mohd Kaharuddin Ashah	Individual	674	31	Did not advance						
Muhammad Zaki Mahazam	Individual	691	16 Q	Bye	Abdulaziz Ahmed A Alobadi (QAT); W 139 – 133; 28-25, 27–25, 28-29, 29–28, 27-26	Chen Po-kai (TPE); W 142 – 136; 28-29, 28–27, 28-28, 30–28, 28-24	Amir Kazempour (IRI); W 140 – 140; 30-27, 29–28, 28-27, 26–28, 27-30, T10-T9	Abhishek Verma (IND); L 135 – 143; 24-28, 26–29, 26-29, 30–28, 29-29	Bronze medal match Paul Marton Dela Cruz (PHI); L 139 – 140; 24-28, 30–26, 29-29, 28–29, 28-28	4
Lee Kin Lip; Mohd Juwaidi Mazuki; Mohd Kaharuddin Ashah; Muhammad Zaki Mahazam	Team	2053	6 Q	—N/a		Iraq; W 230 – 220; 55-56, 58–54, 60-53, 57-57	India; L 229 – 234; 56-59, 58-58, 58-57, 57-60	Did not advance		

== Athletics ==
Key

- Note–Ranks given for track events are within the athlete's heat only
- Q = Qualified for the next round
- q = Qualified for the next round as a fastest loser or, in field events, by position without achieving the qualifying target
- NR = National record
- PB = Personal best
- SB = Season's best
- N/A = Round not applicable for the event
- Bye = Athlete not required to compete in round

Men
Field events

Athlete	Event	Qualification		Final	
Athlete	Event	Distance	Rank	Distance	Rank
Nauraj Singh Randhawa	High jump	—N/a		2.15	14
Iskandar Alwi	Pole vault	—N/a		5.10	8
Muhammad Hakimi Ismail	Triple jump	—N/a		16.29	6
Muhammad Irfan Shamshuddin	Discus throw	—N/a		53.86	12

Women
Track event

Athlete	Event	Round 1			Semifinal			Final	
Athlete	Event	Time	Rank	Overall rank	Time	Rank	Overall rank	Time	Rank
Siti Nur Afiqah Abdul Razak	400 m	54.47	3	12	—N/a			Did not advance	

Field event

Athlete	Event	Qualification		Final	
Athlete	Event	Distance	Rank	Distance	Rank
Noor Amira Mohamad Nafiah	Triple jump	—N/a		13.12 SB	11

== Badminton ==
Individual

Athlete	Event	Round of 64	Round of 32	Round of 16	Quarterfinals	Semifinals	Final	Rank
Athlete	Event	Opposition Score	Opposition Score	Opposition Score	Opposition Score	Opposition Score	Opposition Score	Rank
Lee Chong Wei (1)	Men's singles	Bye	Umer Zeeshan (PAK); W 2-0; 21-14, 21-6	Kashyap Parupalli (IND); W 2-0; 21-12, 21-11	Nguyễn Tiến Minh (VIE); W 2-1; 21-23, 21–16, 21-17	Lin Dan (CHN); L 1-2; 20-22, 21–12, 9-21	Did not advance	3rd place, bronze medalist(s)
Chong Wei Feng	Men's singles	Bye	Chen Long (CHN) (2) L 0-2; 7-21, 13-21	Did not advance				
Tee Jing Yi	Women's singles	—N/a	Akane Yamaguchi (JPN); L 0-2; 14-21, 16-21	Did not advance				
Yang Li Lian	Women's singles	—N/a	Maisa Fathuhulla Ismail (MDV); W W/O	Sung Ji-hyun (KOR) (3) L 0-2; 16-21, 13-21	Did not advance			

Doubles

Athlete	Event	Round of 32	Round of 16	Quarterfinals	Semifinals	Final	Rank
Athlete	Event	Opposition Score	Opposition Score	Opposition Score	Opposition Score	Opposition Score	Rank
Tan Wee Kiong; Goh V Shem	Men's doubles	Lee Sheng-mu; Tsai Chia-hsin (TPE) (5) W 2-1; 15-21, 21–12, 22-20	Wannawat Ampunsuwan; Patiphat Chalardchalaem (THA); W 2-1; 21-19, 15–21, 21-15	Hiroyuki Endo; Kenichi Hayakawa (JPN) (3) W 2-0; 21-16, 21-16	Lee Yong-dae; Yoo Yeon-seong (KOR) (1) L 0-2; 6-21, 15-21	Did not advance	3rd place, bronze medalist(s)
Hoon Thien How; Tan Boon Heong	Men's doubles	Liu Xiaolong; Qiu Zihan (CHN) (6) L W/O	Did not advance				
Woon Khe Wei; Vivian Hoo Kah Mun	Women's doubles	Chen Hsiao-huan; Lai Chia-wen (TPE); W 2-0; 21-15, 21-6	Wang Xiaoli; Yu Yang (CHN) (5); W 2-1; 17-21, 21–11, 22-20	Wang Rong; Zhang Zhibo (MAC); W 2-1; 21-15, 19–21, 21-19	Misaki Matsutomo; Ayaka Takahashi (JPN) (1); L 0-2; 16-21, 17-21	Did not advance	3rd place, bronze medalist(s)
Amelia Alicia Anscelly; Soong Fie Cho	Women's doubles	Puttita Supajirakul; Sapsiree Taerattanachai (THA); L 0-2; 27-29, 16-21	Did not advance				
Chan Peng Soon; Ng Hui Lin	Mixed doubles	Danny Bawa Chrisnanta; Vanessa Neo Yu Yan (SIN) (6) L 1-2; 15-21, 21–6, 15-21	Did not advance				
Lim Khim Wah; Lim Yin Loo	Mixed doubles	Chen Hung-ling; Cheng Wen-hsing (TPE); L 0-2; 19-21, 19-21	Did not advance				

Team

Athlete	Event	Round of 32	Round of 16	Quarterfinals	Semifinals	Final	
Athlete	Event	Opposition Score	Opposition Score	Opposition Score	Opposition Score	Opposition Score	Rank
Chan Peng Soon; Chong Wei Feng; Goh Soon Huat; Goh V Shem; Hoon Thien How; Iskandar Zulkarnain Zainuddin; Lee Chong Wei; Lim Khim Wah; Tan Boon Heong; Tan Wee Kiong (3)	Men's team	—N/a	Bye	Nepal (NEP); W 3-0	China (CHN)(1); L 0-3	Did not advance	3rd place, bronze medalist(s)
Amelia Alicia Anscelly; Lim Chiew Sien; Lim Yin Fun; Lim Yin Loo; Ng Hui Lin; Soong Fie Cho; Tee Jing Yi; Vivian Hoo Kah Mun; Woon Khe Wei; Yang Li Lian	Women's team	—N/a	Nepal (NEP); W 3-0	China (CHN) (1); L 0-3	Did not advance		

== Bowling ==
Singles

Player	Event	Squad A		Squad B		Final rank
Player	Event	Score	Rank	Score	Rank	Final rank
Adrian Ang Hsien Loong	Men's singles			1208	9	25
Alex Liew Kien Liang	Men's singles	1170	26			50
Muhamad Syafiq Ridhwan Abdul Malek	Men's singles			1195	14	32
Muhd Rafiq Ismail	Men's singles	1212	16			24
Tan Chye Chern	Men's singles	1180	24			42
Zulmazran Zulkifli	Men's singles	1298	1			4
Esther Cheah Mei Lan	Women's singles			1255	3	5
Hee Kar Yen	Women's singles	1184	12			24
Shalin Zulkifli	Women's singles	1126	21			39
Sin Li Jane	Women's singles			1232	9	13
Siti Safiyah	Women's singles	1198	11			23
Syaidatul Afifah	Women's singles	1204	9			20

Doubles

Player	Event	Squad A		Squad B		Final rank
Player	Event	Score	Rank	Score	Rank	Final rank
Adrian Ang Hsien Loong; Tan Chye Chern	Men's doubles			2315	14	25
Alex Liew Kien Liang; Muhd Rafiq Ismail	Men's doubles	2414	4			9
Muhamad Syafiq Ridhwan Abdul Malek; Zulmazran Zulkifli	Men's doubles			2324	13	22
Esther Cheah Mei Lan; Syaidatul Afifah	Women's doubles			2303	10	17
Hee Kar Yen; Siti Safiyah	Women's doubles	2351	4			11
Shalin Zulkifli; Sin Li Jane	Women's doubles	2518	1			2nd place, silver medalist(s)

Trios

Player	Event	Block 1		Block 2		Total	Final rank
Player	Event	Score	Rank	Score	Rank	Total	Final rank
Adrian Ang Hsien Loong; Alex Liew Kien Liang; Muhd Rafiq Ismail	Men's trios	1763	13	1877		3640	10
Muhamad Syafiq Ridhwan Abdul Malek; Tan Chye Chern; Zulmazran Zulkifli	Men's trios	1883	2	1918		3801	2nd place, silver medalist(s)
Esther Cheah Mei Lan; Shalin Zulkifli; Sin Li Jane	Women's trios	1797	7	1864		3661	6
Hee Kar Yen; Siti Safiyah; Syaidatul Afifah	Women's trios	1686	16	1682		3368	16

Team

Player	Event	Block 1		Block 2		Total	Final rank
Player	Event	Score	Rank	Score	Rank	Total	Final rank
Adrian Ang Hsien Loong; Alex Liew Kien Liang; Muhd Rafiq Ismail; Muhamad Syafiq Ridhwan Abdul Malek; Tan Chye Chern; Zulmazran Zulkifli	Men's team	2938	8	3048		5986	2nd place, silver medalist(s)
Esther Cheah Mei Lan; Hee Kar Yen; Shalin Zulkifli; Sin Lin Jane; Siti Safiyah; Syaidatul Afifah	Women's team	2830	7	2963		5793	7

All-events

Player	Event	Final					Final rank
Player	Event	Singles	Doubles	Trios	Team	Total	Final rank
Adrian Ang Hsien Loong	Men's all-events	1208	1138	1245	1267	4858	14
Alex Liew Kien Liang	Men's all-events	1170	1192	1211	1201	4774	28
Muhamad Syafiq Ridhwan Abdul Malek	Men's all-events	1195	1161	1267	1170	4793	26
Muhd Rafiq Ismail	Men's all-events	1212	1222	1184	1209	4827	19
Tan Chye Chern	Men's all-events	1180	1177	1300	1155	4812	22
Zulmazran Zulkifli	Men's all-events	1298	1163	1234	1285	4980	5
Esther Cheah Mei Lan	Women's all-events	1255	1087	1050	1115	4507	44
Hee Kar Yen	Women's all-events	1184	1203	1094	1164	4645	30
Shalin Zulkifli	Women's all-events	1126	1229	1231	1191	4777	16
Sin Lin Jane	Women's all-events	1232	1289	1380	1194	5095	2nd place, silver medalist(s)
Siti Safiyah	Women's all-events	1198	1148	1106	1168	4620	34
Syaidatul Afifah	Women's all-events	1204	1216	1168	1076	4664	27

Masters

Player	Event	Preliminary		Stepladder finals	
Player	Event	Score	Rank	Score	Final rank
Adrian Ang Hsien Loong	Men's masters	3268	12	Did not advance	
Zulmazran Zulkifli	Men's masters	3350	8	Did not advance	
Sin Li Jane	Women's masters	3236	10	Did not advance	
Shalin Zulkifli	Women's masters	3266	8	Did not advance	

== Boxing ==
Men

Athlete	Event	Round of 32	Round of 16	Quarterfinals	Semifinals	Final	
Athlete	Event	Opposition Result	Opposition Result	Opposition Result	Opposition Result	Opposition Result	Rank
Muhamad Fuad Mohd Redzuan	Light flyweight (49 kg)	Bye	Bikram Pariyar (NEP); W 3 - 0	Birzhan Zhakypov (KAZ); L 0 - 3	Did not advance		
Khir Akyazlan Azmi	Light welterweight (64 kg)	Abdulrahman Fahad (KUW); W 3 - 0	Chinzorig Baatarsukh (MGL); L 0 - 3	Did not advance			

== Cricket ==
=== Men's tournament ===
Squad list	Group stage		Quarterfinals	Semifinals	Final	Rank
Squad list	Group A	Rank	Quarterfinals	Semifinals	Final	Rank
Ahmad Faiz Mohammad Noor; Ahmad Tajuddin Ismail; Aminuddin Ramly; Mohd Anwar Aruddin; Mohd Nazril Abdul Rahman; Mohd Shafiq Mohd Sharif; Mohd Shahrulnizam Mohd Yusof; Mohd Shukri Abdul Rahim; Mohd Suharril Fetri Shuib; Muhammad Faruq Hakimin Azmi; Muhammad Wafiq Irfan Zabani; Pavandeep Singh; Rakesh Madhavan; Suhan Kumar Alagaratanam; Suresh Navaratnam	South Korea; W 71/8 (20.0 overs) - 72/2 (11.5 overs)	1 Q	Hong Kong; L 129/7 (20.0 overs) - 130/3 (19.4 overs)	Did not advance		5
Ahmad Faiz Mohammad Noor; Ahmad Tajuddin Ismail; Aminuddin Ramly; Mohd Anwar Aruddin; Mohd Nazril Abdul Rahman; Mohd Shafiq Mohd Sharif; Mohd Shahrulnizam Mohd Yusof; Mohd Shukri Abdul Rahim; Mohd Suharril Fetri Shuib; Muhammad Faruq Hakimin Azmi; Muhammad Wafiq Irfan Zabani; Pavandeep Singh; Rakesh Madhavan; Suhan Kumar Alagaratanam; Suresh Navaratnam	China; W 58/1 (9.0 overs) - 56/7 (20.0 overs)	1 Q	Hong Kong; L 129/7 (20.0 overs) - 130/3 (19.4 overs)	Did not advance		5

=== Women's tournament ===
Squad list	Group stage		Quarterfinals	Semifinals	Final	Rank
Squad list	Group D	Rank	Quarterfinals	Semifinals	Final	Rank
Winifred Duraisingam (C); Nur Aishah Sua Gile; Emylia Eliani Md Rahim; Christina Nina Baret (WK); Rewina Mohammad; Jennifer Francis; Jannadiah Halim; Dewi Idora Chunam; Intan Jamahidayu Jaafar; Nur Nadhirah Moh Nasruddin; Fathinah Nusrah Yusra Mohd Nasri	Thailand; L 49/8 (20.0 overs) - 50/1 (11.4 overs)	3	Did not advance			10
Winifred Duraisingam (C); Nur Aishah Sua Gile; Emylia Eliani Md Rahim; Christina Nina Baret (WK); Rewina Mohammad; Jennifer Francis; Jannadiah Halim; Dewi Idora Chunam; Intan Jamahidayu Jaafar; Nur Nadhirah Moh Nasruddin; Fathinah Nusrah Yusra Mohd Nasri	Nepal; L 42 (14.5 overs) - 88/3 (20.0 overs)	3	Did not advance			10

== Cycling ==
=== Road ===
Athletes	Event	Time	Rank
Loh Sea Keong	Men's individual road race	4:10:47	11
Muhammad Fauzan Ahmad Lutfi	Men's individual road race	4:17:10	32
Muhammad Fauzan Ahmad Lutfi	Men's individual time trial	54:10.21	9

=== Track ===
Sprint

Athlete	Event	Qualifying		1/16 final	1/8 final	Quarterfinal	Semifinal	Final	
Athlete	Event	Time Speed (km/h)	Rank	Opposition Time Speed (km/h)	Opposition Time Speed (km/h)	Opposition	Opposition	Opposition	Rank
Azizulhasni Awang	Men's sprint	10.062; 71.556	2 Q	Habeeb Salman Al-Shabeeb (KSA); W 11.724; 61.412	Law Kwun Wa (HKG); W 11.202; 64.274	Im Chae-bin (KOR); W 10.567, W 10.376	Tomoyuki Kawabata (JPN); L, L	Bronze medal match Bao Saifei (CHN); W 10.547, L, L	4
Muhammad Edrus Md Yunos	Men's sprint	10.185; 70.692	8 Q	Liao Kuo-lung (TPE); W 10.711; 67.220	Bao Saifei (CHN); L	Did not advance			
Muhammad Edrus Md Yunos	Men's sprint	10.185; 70.692	8 Q	Liao Kuo-lung (TPE); W 10.711; 67.220	1/8 Repechages; Choi Lae-seon (KOR); Law Kwun Wa (HKG); L	Did not advance			
Azizulhasni Awang; Josiah Ng; Muhammad Edrus Md Yunos	Men's team sprint	China (CHN); Xu Chao; Hu Ke; Bao Saifei; L 1:02.077; 57.992	5	—N/a				Did not advance	
Fatehah Mustapa	Women's sprint	11.211; 64.222	5 Q	—N/a		Lee Hye-jin (KOR); W 12.252, W 12.112	Zhong Tianshi (CHN); L, L	Bronze medal match Lin Junhong (CHN); L, W 11.836, L	4
Fatehah Mustapa; Jupha Somnet	Women's team sprint	Chinese Taipei (TPE); Hsiao Mei-yu; Huang Ting-ying; L 46.988; 51.025	5	—N/a				Did not advance	

Omnium

Athlete	Event	Points race		Flying lap		Time trial		Elimination race	Individual pursuit		Scratch race	Total points	Rank
Athlete	Event	Points	Rank	Time	Rank	Time	Rank	Rank	Time	Rank	Rank	Total points	Rank
Jupha Somnet	Women's omnium	23	3	20.755	6	47.620	6	5	4:01.395	6	6	175	6

Keirin

Athlete	Event	Round 1		Repechage 1		Round 2		Final	
Athlete	Event	Opposition Time	Rank	Opposition Time	Rank	Opposition Time	Rank	Opposition Time	Rank
Azizulhasni Awang	Men's keirin	Kang Dong-jin (KOR); Bao Saifei (CHN); Wu Lok Chun (HKG); Mahmoud Parash (IRI); Ahmed Yousef Al-Mansoori (UAE); L +0.010	2 Q	Bye		Yuta Wakimoto (JPN); Bao Saifei (CHN); Im Chae-bin (KOR); Xu Chao (CHN); Law Kwun Wa (HKG); L +0.282	3 Q	1st – 6th classification Mohammad Daneshvarkhourram (IRI); Kazunari Watanabe (JPN); Josiah Ng (MAS); Bao Saifei (CHN); Yuta Wakimoto (JPN); L REL	6
Josiah Ng	Men's keirin	Yuta Wakimoto (JPN); Mohammad Daneshvarkhourram (IRI); Im Chae-bin (KOR); Liao Kuo-lung (TPE); Amrit Singh (IND); Moslim Ali (KUW); L DNF	7 R	Bao Saifei (CHN); Mahmoud Parash (IRI); Liao Kuo-lung (TPE); Amarjit Singh Nagi (IND); Muhammad Shakeel (PAK); Moslim Ali (KUW); W	1 Q	Kazunari Watanabe (JPN); Mohammad Daneshvarkhourram (IRI); Kang Dong-jin (KOR); Mahmoud Parash (IRI); Satjakul Sianglam (KOR); L +0.026	2 Q	1st – 6th classification Mohammad Daneshvarkhourram (IRI); Kazunari Watanabe (JPN); Bao Saifei (CHN); Yuta Wakimoto (JPN); Azizulhasni Awang (MAS); L +0.124	3rd place, bronze medalist(s)
Fatehah Mustapa	Women's keirin	Lin Junhong (CHN); Lee Hye-jin (KOR); Takako Ishii (JPN); Mohan Mahitha (IND); Jutatip Maneephan (THA); L +0.001	2 Q	—N/a				1st – 6th classification Lee Wai Sze (HKG); Zhong Tianshi (CHN); Lee Hye-jin (KOR); Kim Wong-yeong (KOR); Lin Junhong (CHN); L +0.070	2nd place, silver medalist(s)

== Equestrian ==
Jumping

Athlete	Horse	Event	Qualifier						Final						Rank
Athlete	Horse	Event	First		Second		Total		Round A		Round B		Total score (A + B)		Rank
Athlete	Horse	Event	Pen.	Rank	Pen.	Rank	Pen.	Rank	Pen.	Rank	Pen.	Rank	Pen.	Rank	Rank
Syed Omar Syed Abu Bakar Al-Mohdzar	Apart	Individual jumping	Did not advance												

== Field hockey ==
=== Men's tournament ===
Group A

Rank	Team	Pld	W	D	L	GF	GA	GD	Pts
8	South Korea	4	4	0	0	25	1	+24	12
13	Malaysia	4	3	0	1	18	6	+12	9
14	Japan	4	2	0	2	22	8	+15	6
30	Bangladesh	4	1	0	2	3	21	-18	3
36	Singapore	4	0	0	4	3	35	-32	0

20 September
15:00

Malaysia	8–2	Singapore
Razie Rahim 2' 17' 35'; Fitri Saari 3'; Firhan Ashaari 30'; Tengku Ahmad Tajuddin 37'; Izwan Firdaus Ahmad Tajuddin 48'; Shahrun Nabil 51'	Report	Enrico Elifh Abdul Lathif Marican 11'; Silas Abdul Razak Noor Shah 28'

Seonhak Hockey Stadium, Incheon
Umpires:
Haider Rasool (PAK)
Lam Ho Yeung (HKG)

21 September
13:00

Malaysia	5–1	Bangladesh
Razie Rahim 20' 60'; Marhan Jalil 46'; Izwan Firdaus Ahmad Tajuddin 52'; Shahrun Nabil 59'	Report	Krishna Kumar Das 30'

Seonhak Hockey Stadium, Incheon
Umpires:
Simon Taylor (NZL)
Sulaiyam Balushi (OMA)

25 September
19:00

Malaysia	1–2	South Korea
Marhan Jalil 59'	Report	Nam Hyun-woo 24' 43'

Seonhak Hockey Stadium, Incheon
Umpires:
Chen Dekang (CHN)
Javed Nuruddin Shaikh (IND)

27 September
15:00

Japan	1–4	Malaysia
Toshiro Tachibana 14'	Report	Firhan Ashaari 2'; Razie Rahim 20' 39'; Izwan Firdaus Ahmad Tajuddin 42'

Seonhak Hockey Stadium, Incheon
Umpires:
Haider Rasool (PAK)
Jakub Mejzlik (CZE)

Semifinal

September 30
19:00

Pakistan	1–0	Malaysia
Muhammad Imran 24'	Report

Seonhak Hockey Stadium, Incheon
Umpires:
Simon Taylor (NZL)
Chen Dekang (CHN)

Bronze medal match

October 2
16:30

South Korea	3–2	Malaysia
Jang Jong-hyun 19' 43'; Kim Young-jin 30'	Report	Razie Rahim 34' 44'

Seonhak Hockey Stadium, Incheon
Umpires:
Javed Nuruddin Shaikh (IND)
Haider Rasool (PAK)

Ranked 4th in final standings

=== Women's tournament ===
Pool A

Rank	Team	Pld	W	D	L	GF	GA	GD	Pts
5	China	3	3	0	0	8	1	+7	9
13	India	3	2	0	1	10	3	+7	6
21	Malaysia	3	1	0	2	3	8	-5	3
53	Thailand	3	0	0	3	1	10	-9	0

22 September
13:00

China	1–0	Malaysia
Wu Mengrong 41'	Report

Seonhak Hockey Stadium, Incheon
Umpires:
Claire Adenot (FRA)
Nirmla Dagar (IND)

24 September
15:00

Malaysia	2–1	Thailand
Fazilla Sylvester Silin 24'; Siti Noor Amarina Ruhani 27'	Report	Tikhamporn Sakunpithak 53'

Seonhak Hockey Stadium, Incheon
Umpires:
Emi Yamada (JPN)
Allison Robertson (CAN)

26 September
17:00

Malaysia	1–6	India
Nadia Abdul Rahman 41'	Report	Rani Rampal 4' 20'; Jaspreet Kaur 9' 39'; Namita Toppo 17'; Ritu Rani 41'; Vandana Kataria 50'

Seonhak Hockey Stadium, Incheon
Umpires:
Laurine Delforge (BEL)
Ompimol Kittiteerasopon (THA)

Fifth and sixth place classification

1 October
14:00

Malaysia	8–0	Kazakhstan
Rabiatul Adawiyah Mohamed 20'; Norbaini Hashim 38'; Norazlin Sumantri 38'; Nuraini Abdul Rashid 45' 53' 55'; Norhasikin Halim 51'; Fazilla Sylvester Silin 56'	Report

Seonhak Hockey Stadium, Incheon
Umpires:
Ompimol Kittiteerasopon (THA)
Allison Robertson (CAN)

Ranked 5th in final standings

== Football ==
=== Men's tournament ===
==== First round ====
Pos	Team	Pld	W	D	L	GF	GA	GD	Pts
1	South Korea	3	3	0	0	6	0	+6	9
2	Saudi Arabia	3	2	0	1	6	1	+5	6
3	Malaysia	3	1	0	2	4	6	−2	3
4	Laos	3	0	0	3	0	9	−9	0

Source: RSSSF
14 September
17:00

South Korea	3–0	Malaysia
Rim Chang-woo 27'; Kim Shin-wook 78'; Kim Seung-dae 82'	Report

Incheon Munhak Stadium
Referee: Abdullah Balideh (Qatar)

17 September
17:00

Malaysia	4–0	Laos
Aidil 12'; Farhan 76'; Fandi 79'; Ferris 83'	Report

Ansan Wa~ Stadium
Referee: Mohamed Al Zarouni (United Arab Emirates)

21 September
17:00

Malaysia	0–3	Saudi Arabia
	Report	Al Hafith 56'; Majed Omar 73'; Al Shehri 84'

Goyang Stadium
Referee: Sivakorn Pu-Udom (Thailand)

Ranked 19th in final standings

== Golf ==
Men

Athlete	Event	Round 1	Round 2	Round 3	Round 4	Total score	Par	Final rank
Athlete	Event	Score	Score	Score	Score	Total score	Par	Final rank
Chan Tuck Soon	Individual	72	77	73	70	292	+4	34
Low Khai Jie	Individual	69	75	70	72	286	-2	=22
Muhd Afif Muhammad Razif	Individual	71	71	73	72	287	-1	=26
Muhd Wafi Abdul Manaf	Individual	75	78	72	72	297	+9	=39
Chan Tuck Soon; Low Khai Jie; Muhd Afif Muhammad Razif; Muhd Wafi Abdul Manaf	Team	212	223	215	214	864	0	8

== Gymnastics ==
=== Artistic ===
Women

Athlete	Event	VT Rank	UB Rank	BB Rank	FX Rank	Total	Rank
Farah Ann Abdul Hadi	Qualification	13.650; 19	10.450; 28	13.000; 13	13.225; 9 Q	50.325	16 Q
Farah Ann Abdul Hadi	Individual all-around	13.650; 6	12.800; 6	12.250; 12	13.050; 4	51.750	7
Farah Ann Abdul Hadi	Floor	—N/a			13.266; 7	13.266	7

== Kabaddi ==
=== Men's tournament ===
Squad list	Preliminary round		Semifinal	Final	Rank
Squad list	Group B	Rank	Semifinal	Final	Rank
Jegankumar Balaraman (C); Kartigeyen Bandi; Mugilan Batumalai; Justin Johnson; Sasi Kumar Manimaran; Dunishwaran Markandan; Prem Mohan; Edwin Srirush Muniandy; Krishnan Nair Prakash; Premkumar Pushparajan	Iran; L 22 – 56	3	Did not advance		5
Jegankumar Balaraman (C); Kartigeyen Bandi; Mugilan Batumalai; Justin Johnson; Sasi Kumar Manimaran; Dunishwaran Markandan; Prem Mohan; Edwin Srirush Muniandy; Krishnan Nair Prakash; Premkumar Pushparajan	Japan; W 23 – 19	3	Did not advance		5
Jegankumar Balaraman (C); Kartigeyen Bandi; Mugilan Batumalai; Justin Johnson; Sasi Kumar Manimaran; Dunishwaran Markandan; Prem Mohan; Edwin Srirush Muniandy; Krishnan Nair Prakash; Premkumar Pushparajan	South Korea; L 32 – 38	3	Did not advance		5

== Karate ==
Men

Athlete	Event	1/16 final	1/8 final	Quarterfinal	Semifinal	Final	Rank
Athlete	Event	Opposition Score	Opposition Score	Opposition Score	Opposition Score	Opposition Score	Rank
Lim Chee Wei	Individual kata	—N/a	Bye	Bastola Parshu Ram (NEP); W 5 – 0	Issei Shimbaba (JPN); W 4 – 1	Gold medal match Fidelys Lolobua (INA); W 3 – 2	1st place, gold medalist(s)
Senthil Kumaran Silvarajoo	Kumite 55 kg	—N/a	Bye	Bijay Lama (NEP); W 7 – 0	Abdullah Imubarak Al-Harbi (KSA); L 0 – 8	Bronze medal match Suryadi (INA); W 4^{5} – 4^{0}	3rd place, bronze medalist(s)
Sharmendran Raghonathan	Kumite 67 kg	Bye	Mukhammadzaid Iminov (UZB); W 4 – 0	Abdulaziz Ali (KUW); L 2 – 7	Did not advance		

Women

Athlete	Event	1/16 final	1/8 final	Quarterfinal	Semifinal	Final	Rank
Athlete	Event	Opposition Score	Opposition Score	Opposition Score	Opposition Score	Opposition Score	Rank
Nisha Alagasan	Kumite 55 kg	—N/a	Wen Tzu-yun (TPE); L 1 – 5	Did not advance	Repechage 1 Phuong Tran Hoang Yen (VIE); W 8 – 0	Bronze medal match Miki Kobayashi (JPN); L 0 – 1	4
Syakilla Salni Jefry Krisnan	Kumite 61 kg	—N/a	Princess Diane Sicangco (PHI); W 3 – 1	Han Bui Thi Ngoc (VIE); W 2^{4} – 2^{1}	Yin Xiaoyan (CHN); W 2 – 0	Gold medal match Barno Mirzaeva (UZB); W 10 – 2	1st place, gold medalist(s)
Shree Sharmini Segaran	Kumite 68 kg	—N/a	Bye	Kayo Someya (JPN); W 3 – 0	Guzaliya Gafurova (KAZ); L 0 – 2	Bronze medal match Pegah Zangenehkarkooti (IRI); W 2 – 1	3rd place, bronze medalist(s)

== Rugby sevens ==
=== Men's tournament ===
Squad list	Preliminary round		Quarterfinal	Semifinal	Final	Rank
Squad list	Pool A	Rank	Quarterfinal	Semifinal	Final	Rank
Anwarrul Aswad Ahmad; Anwarul Hafiz Ahmad; Dinesvaran Krishnan; Mohd Fairuz Abdul Rahman; Mohd Izwan Abu Bakar; Muhammad Ameer Nasrun Zulkeffli; Muhammad Danial Noor Hamidi; Muhammad Faridzal Ismail; Muhammad Hanafi Zaini; Nazuriddin Abdul Latiff; Wanizzuddin Ismail; Zulkiflee Azmi	Thailand; L 10 – 17 (5-10, 5-7)	3	Did not advance		Ninth to twelfth place classification Pakistan; W 36 – 0 (14-0, 22-0)	9
Anwarrul Aswad Ahmad; Anwarul Hafiz Ahmad; Dinesvaran Krishnan; Mohd Fairuz Abdul Rahman; Mohd Izwan Abu Bakar; Muhammad Ameer Nasrun Zulkeffli; Muhammad Danial Noor Hamidi; Muhammad Faridzal Ismail; Muhammad Hanafi Zaini; Nazuriddin Abdul Latiff; Wanizzuddin Ismail; Zulkiflee Azmi	Saudi Arabia; W 55 – 0 (31-0, 24-0)	3	Did not advance		Ninth and tenth place classification Lebanon; W 35 – 5 (14-5, 21-0)	9
Anwarrul Aswad Ahmad; Anwarul Hafiz Ahmad; Dinesvaran Krishnan; Mohd Fairuz Abdul Rahman; Mohd Izwan Abu Bakar; Muhammad Ameer Nasrun Zulkeffli; Muhammad Danial Noor Hamidi; Muhammad Faridzal Ismail; Muhammad Hanafi Zaini; Nazuriddin Abdul Latiff; Wanizzuddin Ismail; Zulkiflee Azmi	Japan; L 0 – 57 (0-24, 0-33)	3	Did not advance		Ninth and tenth place classification Lebanon; W 35 – 5 (14-5, 21-0)	9

=== Women's tournament ===
Squad list	Preliminary round		Semifinal	Final	Rank
Squad list	Pool B	Rank	Semifinal	Final	Rank
Aki Loh Nong Sim; Cut Iffa Izza Tengku Ermanda; Fidelia Limang Telajan; Haslinda Mohd Salleh; Jasmine Kaur Bhatt; Liyana Kamarul Baharin; Mas Mulsah Ismail; Mona Tiara Izaniah Abdul Manan; Nor Halina Mohd Zaini; Normasyirah Zahari; Nurfarah Hanim Rahim; Rozzaiti Che Roslee	Thailand; L 0 – 52 (0-26, 0-26)	4	Did not advance	Fifth to eighth place classification Singapore; L 0 – 27 (0-10, 0-17)	8
Aki Loh Nong Sim; Cut Iffa Izza Tengku Ermanda; Fidelia Limang Telajan; Haslinda Mohd Salleh; Jasmine Kaur Bhatt; Liyana Kamarul Baharin; Mas Mulsah Ismail; Mona Tiara Izaniah Abdul Manan; Nor Halina Mohd Zaini; Normasyirah Zahari; Nurfarah Hanim Rahim; Rozzaiti Che Roslee	Hong Kong; L 0 – 65 (0-24, 0-41)	4	Did not advance	Fifth to eighth place classification Singapore; L 0 – 27 (0-10, 0-17)	8
Aki Loh Nong Sim; Cut Iffa Izza Tengku Ermanda; Fidelia Limang Telajan; Haslinda Mohd Salleh; Jasmine Kaur Bhatt; Liyana Kamarul Baharin; Mas Mulsah Ismail; Mona Tiara Izaniah Abdul Manan; Nor Halina Mohd Zaini; Normasyirah Zahari; Nurfarah Hanim Rahim; Rozzaiti Che Roslee	Kazakhstan; L 0 – 56 (0-31, 0-25)	4	Did not advance	Seventh and eighth place classification Uzbekistan; L 5 – 12 (0-5, 5-7)	8
Aki Loh Nong Sim; Cut Iffa Izza Tengku Ermanda; Fidelia Limang Telajan; Haslinda Mohd Salleh; Jasmine Kaur Bhatt; Liyana Kamarul Baharin; Mas Mulsah Ismail; Mona Tiara Izaniah Abdul Manan; Nor Halina Mohd Zaini; Normasyirah Zahari; Nurfarah Hanim Rahim; Rozzaiti Che Roslee	Laos; W 12 – 5 (12-0, 0-5)	4	Did not advance	Seventh and eighth place classification Uzbekistan; L 5 – 12 (0-5, 5-7)	8

== Sailing ==
Men

Athlete	Event	Race												Net points	Rank
Athlete	Event	1	2	3	4	5	6	7	8	9	10	11	12	Net points	Rank
Muhammad Dhiauddin Rozaini	One Person Dinghy Optimist	1	2	4	1	5	11; OCS	1	6	2	2	~~11~~; DSQ	3	38	4
Khairulnizam Afendy	One Person Dinghy Laser	1	1	2	2	2	3	3	2	2	2	~~4~~	3	23	2nd place, silver medalist(s)
Ahmad Syukri Abdul Aziz; Mohamad Faizal Norizan	Two Person Dinghy 420	1	1	2	3	1	1	3	~~4~~	1	1	1	2	17	1st place, gold medalist(s)
Ku Anas Ku Zamil; Mohamad Hafizzudin Mazelan	Two Person Dinghy 470	6	~~6~~	2	4	3	5	5	4	1	5	3	1	39	5

Women

Athlete	Event	Race												Net points	Rank
Athlete	Event	1	2	3	4	5	6	7	8	9	10	11	12	Net points	Rank
Geh Cheow Lin	Windsurfer RS:One	7	7	7	7	7	7	7	5	7	7	7	~~7~~	75	7
Nor Nabila Natasha Mohd Nazri	One Person Dinghy Optimist	4	3	4	3	2	2	3	5	~~5~~	4	4	1	35	4
Nur Amirah Hamid	One Person Dinghy Laser Radial	4	5	4	6	3	3	6	~~8~~	5	6	6	6	54	5
Nuraisyah Jamil; Umi Norwahida Sallahuddin	Two Person Dinghy 420	2	1	3	2	2	2	~~5~~	4	2	2	1	2	23	2nd place, silver medalist(s)
Norashikin Mohamad Sayed; Nurul Elia Anuar	Two Person Dinghy 29er	4	4	4	4	5	3	3	4	4	3	~~5~~	4	42	4

Open

Athlete	Event	Round Robin		Semifinals	Final	Rank
Athlete	Event	Opponent Score	Rank	Opponent Score	Opponent Score	Rank
Jeremy Koo Wui Ken; Looi Sing Yew; Mohamed Fauzi Mohamed Mustafa; Ong Khong Shing	Match racing J80	Singapore (SIN); L 0–2; Japan (JPN); W 1–1; South Korea (KOR); W 1–1; Bahrain (BRN); W 1–1; India (IND); W 1–1; China (CHN); W 2–0; Hong Kong (HKG); W 2–0; Chinese Taipei (TPE); W 2–0	4 Q	Singapore (SIN); L 0–3	Bronze medal match Japan (JPN); L 0–2	4

== Sepaktakraw ==
Men

Squad list	Event	Preliminary	Rank	Semifinal	Final	Rank
Izurin Refin; Mohamad Fadzli Muhammad Roslan; Mohammad Syahir Mohd Rosdi; Mohd Syazreenqamar Salehan; Mohd Zamree Mohd Dahan	Regu	South Korea; L 1 - 2; 21-14, 16–21, 10-21	2	Thailand; L 0 - 2; 9-21, 8-21	Did not advance	3rd place, bronze medalist(s)
Izurin Refin; Mohamad Fadzli Muhammad Roslan; Mohammad Syahir Mohd Rosdi; Mohd Syazreenqamar Salehan; Mohd Zamree Mohd Dahan	Regu	Brunei; W 2 - 0; 21-18, 21-10	2	Thailand; L 0 - 2; 9-21, 8-21	Did not advance	3rd place, bronze medalist(s)
Izurin Refin; Mohamad Fadzli Muhammad Roslan; Mohammad Syahir Mohd Rosdi; Mohd Syazreenqamar Salehan; Mohd Zamree Mohd Dahan	Regu	India; W 2 - 0; 24-22, 21-18	2	Thailand; L 0 - 2; 9-21, 8-21	Did not advance	3rd place, bronze medalist(s)
Izurin Refin; Mohamad Fadzli Muhammad Roslan; Mohammad Syahir Mohd Rosdi; Mohd Syazreenqamar Salehan; Mohd Zamree Mohd Dahan	Regu	Nepal; W 2 - 0 DNS	2	Thailand; L 0 - 2; 9-21, 8-21	Did not advance	3rd place, bronze medalist(s)
Ahmad Aizat Mohd Nor Azmi; Amirul Zazwan Amir; Izurin Refin; Mohamad Fadzli Muhammad Roslan; Mohammad Syahir Mohd Rosdi; Mohd Helmi Ismail; Mohd Kamal Alfiza Shafie; Mohd Muqlis Borhan; Mohd Syazreenqamar Salehan; Mohd Zamree Mohd Dahan; Muhammad Idham Sulaiman; Zuleffendi Sumari	Team	Indonesia; L 1 - 2; 19-21, 14–21; 22-20, 25–23; 11-21, 21-23	2 Q	Thailand; L 0 - 2; 16-21, 10–21; 14-21, 11-21	Did not advance	3rd place, bronze medalist(s)
Ahmad Aizat Mohd Nor Azmi; Amirul Zazwan Amir; Izurin Refin; Mohamad Fadzli Muhammad Roslan; Mohammad Syahir Mohd Rosdi; Mohd Helmi Ismail; Mohd Kamal Alfiza Shafie; Mohd Muqlis Borhan; Mohd Syazreenqamar Salehan; Mohd Zamree Mohd Dahan; Muhammad Idham Sulaiman; Zuleffendi Sumari	Team	China; W 3 - 0; 21-17, 21–18; 22-20, 21–12; 21-4, 21-16	2 Q	Thailand; L 0 - 2; 16-21, 10–21; 14-21, 11-21	Did not advance	3rd place, bronze medalist(s)

Women

Squad list	Event	Preliminary	Rank	Semifinal	Final	Rank
Kamisah Khamis; Nurul Aqirah Mat Tahir; Nurul Izzatul Hikmah Md Zulkifli	Double regu	Vietnam; L 0 - 2; 14-21, 10-21	3	Did not advance		
Kamisah Khamis; Nurul Aqirah Mat Tahir; Nurul Izzatul Hikmah Md Zulkifli	Double regu	Myanmar; L 0 - 2; 11-21, 11-21	3	Did not advance		
Elly Syahira Rosli; Noor Fairuz Azizan; Nor Farhana Ismail; Nurrashidah Abdul Rashid; Siti Norzubaidah Che Abdul Wahab	Regu	Japan; L 1 - 2; 21-17, 15–21, 12-21	4	Did not advance		
Elly Syahira Rosli; Noor Fairuz Azizan; Nor Farhana Ismail; Nurrashidah Abdul Rashid; Siti Norzubaidah Che Abdul Wahab	Regu	South Korea; L 0 - 2; 6-21, 9-21	4	Did not advance		
Elly Syahira Rosli; Noor Fairuz Azizan; Nor Farhana Ismail; Nurrashidah Abdul Rashid; Siti Norzubaidah Che Abdul Wahab	Regu	Thailand; L 0 - 2; 6-21, 11-21	4	Did not advance		

== Shooting ==
Men

Athlete	Event	Qualification		Final	
Athlete	Event	Score	Rank	Score	Rank
Choo Wen Yan	10 m air pistol	567-14x	35	Did not advance	
Eddy Chew	10 m air pistol	565-14x	39	Did not advance	
Jonathan Wong Guanjie	10 m air pistol	574-18x	22	Did not advance	
Choo Wen Yan; Eddy Chew; Jonathan Wong Guanjie	10 m air pistol team	—N/a		1706-46x	9
Choo Wen Yan	50 m pistol	526-11x	43	Did not advance	
Eddy Chew	50 m pistol	529-8x	39	Did not advance	
Jonathan Wong Guanjie	50 m pistol	550-8x	18	Did not advance	
Choo Wen Yan; Eddy Chew; Jonathan Wong Guanjie	50 m pistol team	—N/a		1605-27x	11
Mohammad Zubair Muhammad	10 m air rifle	603.5-25x	48	Did not advance	
Mohd Hadafi Jaafar	10 m air rifle	603.9-28x	47	Did not advance	
Muhammad Ezuan Nasir Khan	10 m air rifle	616.6-42x	25	Did not advance	
Mohammad Zubair Muhammad; Mohd Hadafi Jaafar; Muhammad Ezuan Nasir Khan	10 m air rifle team	—N/a		1824.0-95x	14
Mohammad Zubair Muhammad	50 m rifle prone	605.5-23x	46	Did not advance	
Mohd Hadafi Jaafar	50 m rifle prone	614.2-31x	26	Did not advance	
Muhammad Ezuan Nasir Khan	50 m rifle prone	622.2-34x	8 Q	208.5	2nd place, silver medalist(s)
Mohammad Zubair Muhammad; Mohd Hadafi Jaafar; Muhammad Ezuan Nasir Khan	50 m rifle prone team	—N/a		1841.9-88x	10
Mohammad Zubair Muhammad	50 m rifle three positions	1138-38x	31	Did not advance	
Mohd Hadafi Jaafar	50 m rifle three positions	1130-33x	34	Did not advance	
Muhammad Ezuan Nasir Khan	50 m rifle three positions	1122-37x	38	Did not advance	
Mohammad Zubair Muhammad; Mohd Hadafi Jaafar; Muhammad Ezuan Nasir Khan	50 m rifle three positions team	—N/a		3390-108x	12

Shotgun

Athlete	Event	Qualification		Semifinals		Final	
Athlete	Event	Points	Rank	Points	Rank	Points	Rank
Benjamin Khor Cheng Jie	Double trap	129	21	Did not advance			
Khor Seng Chye	Double trap	124	25	Did not advance			

Women

Athlete	Event	Qualification		Semifinal		Final	
Athlete	Event	Score	Rank	Score	Rank	Score	Rank
Alia Sazana Azahari	10 m air pistol	370-7x	31	—N/a		Did not advance	
Alia Sazana Azahari	25 m pistol	569-17x	25	Did not advance			
Muslifah Zulkifli	10 m air rifle	409.1-26x	32	—N/a		Did not advance	
Nur Ayuni Farhana Abdul Halim	10 m air rifle	412.9-29x	17	—N/a		Did not advance	
Nur Suryani Taibi	10 m air rifle	414.3-29x	11	—N/a		Did not advance	
Muslifah Zulkifli; Nur Ayuni Farhana Abdul Halim; Nur Suryani Taibi	10 m air rifle team	—N/a				1236.3-84x	7
Muslifah Zulkifli	50 m rifle prone	—N/a				618.3-30x	10
Nur Ayuni Farhana Abdul Halim	50 m rifle prone	—N/a				614.7-32x	21
Nur Suryani Taibi	50 m rifle prone	—N/a				620.6-39x	2nd place, silver medalist(s)
Muslifah Zulkifli; Nur Ayuni Farhana Abdul Halim; Nur Suryani Taibi	50 m rifle prone team	—N/a				1853.6-101x	3rd place, bronze medalist(s)
Muslifah Zulkifli	50 m rifle three positions	572-21x	26	—N/a		Did not advance	
Nur Ayuni Farhana Abdul Halim	50 m rifle three positions	575-18x	18	—N/a		Did not advance	
Nur Suryani Taibi	50 m rifle three positions	576-24x	11	—N/a		Did not advance	
Muslifah Zulkifli; Nur Ayuni Farhana Abdul Halim; Nur Suryani Taibi	50 m rifle three positions team	—N/a				1723-63x	5

== Squash ==
Individual

Athlete	Event	Round of 32	Round of 16	Quarterfinal	Semifinal	Final	Rank
Athlete	Event	Opposition Score	Opposition Score	Opposition Score	Opposition Score	Opposition Score	Rank
Mohd Nafiizwan Adnan (4)	Men's singles	Bye	Wang Junjie (CHN); W 11–5, 11–7, 11-6	Abdullah Al-Muzayen (KUW); L 7-11, 11–6, 6-11, 6-11	Did not advance		
Ong Beng Hee (3)	Men's singles	Bye	Farhan Mehboob (PAK); W 11–9, 11–6, 11-3	Leo Au (HKG); W 11–8, 9-11, 11–9, 11-7	Saurav Ghosal (IND); L 9-11, 4-11, 5-11	Did not advance	3rd place, bronze medalist(s)
Low Wee Wern (2)	Women's singles	—N/a	Park Eu-nok (KOR); W 11–6, 11–9, 11-6	Joey Chan (HKG); W 11–6, 8-11, 11–6, 11-5	Annie Au (HKG); W 11–9, 11–5, 11-5	Gold medal match Nicol David (MAS); 11-9, 5-11, 6-11, 10-12	2nd place, silver medalist(s)
Nicol David (1)	Women's singles	—N/a	Bye	Misaki Kobayashi (JPN); W 11–7, 11–5, 11-7	Dipika Pallikal (IND); W 11–4, 11–4, 11-5	Gold medal match Low Wee Wern (MAS); 9-11, 11–5, 11–6, 12-10	1st place, gold medalist(s)

=== Men's team ===
Pool B

Team	Pld	W	L	MF	MA
Malaysia	4	4	0	0	0
India	4	3	1	0	0
Jordan	4	2	2	0	0
Japan	4	1	3	0	0
China	4	0	4	0	0

23 September Report	Malaysia	3–0	China

Mohd Azlan Iskandar	3–0	Liang Jun	11–1, 11–2, 11–1
Mohd Nafiizwan Adnan	3–1	Wang Junjie	5–11, 11–8, 11–1, 11–4
Ivan Yuen	3–0	Shen Jiaqi	11–6, 11–8, 11–7

24 September Report	Malaysia	2–1	Jordan

Ong Beng Hee	3–0	Ahmad Khaleel Ahmad Al-Sarraj	11–9, 11–5, 11–9
Ivan Yuen	0–3	Mohammad Khalil Ahmad Al-Sarraj	11–13, 10–12, 8–11
Mohd Azlan Iskandar	3–0	Ibrahim Khaleel Ibrahim Abulaban	11–3, 11–4, 11–1

24 September Report	Malaysia	3–0	Japan

Ong Beng Hee	3–0	Yuta Fukui	11–8, 11–8, 11–7
Mohd Nafiizwan Adnan	3–0	Shinnosuke Tsukue	11–7, 13–11, 11–6
Ivan Yuen	3–0	Takanori Shimizu	11–6, 11–8, 11–4

25 September Report	Malaysia	2–1	India

Mohd Nafiizwan Adnan	3–2	Harinder Pal Sandhu	11–4, 10–12, 11–8, 8–11, 11–4
Mohd Azlan Iskandar	3–1	Kumar Kush	12–10, 11–7, 5–11, 12–10
Ong Beng Hee	0–3	Mahesh Mangaonkar	9–11, 3–11, 1–11

Semifinal

26 September Report	Hong Kong	0–2	Malaysia

Au Chun Ming	1–3	Mohd Nafiizwan Adnan	8–11, 11–19, 8–11, 7–11
Lee Ho Yin	1–3	Ong Beng Hee	11–2, 6–11, 11–13, 8–11
Yip Tsz Fung	Mohd Azlan Iskandar	not played

Gold medal match

27 September Report	India	2–0	Malaysia

Harinder Pal Sandhu	3–1	Mohd Azlan Iskandar	11–8, 11–6, 8–11, 11–4
Saurav Ghosal	3–2	Ong Beng Hee	6–11, 11–7, 11–6, 12–14, 11–9
Mahesh Mangaonkar	Mohd Nafiizwan Adnan	not played

=== Women's team ===
Team	Pld	W	L	MF	MA
Malaysia	2	2	0	0	0
South Korea	2	1	1	0	0
Japan	2	0	2	0	0

24 September Report	Malaysia	3–0	Japan

Nicol David	3–0	Misaki Kobayashi	11–5, 11–3, 11–9
Delia Arnold	3–2	Chinatsu Matsui	11–5, 9–11, 11–3, 7–11, 11–7
Vanessa Raj	3–0	Satomi Watanabe	11–6, 11–9, 11–2

25 September Report	Malaysia	3–0	South Korea

Delia Arnold	3–0	Yang Yeon-soo	11–3, 11–3, 11–7
Vanessa Raj	3–0	Lee Ji-hyun	11–7, 11–7, 11–5
Low Wee Wern	3–0	Song Sun-mi	11–8, 11–7, 11–4

Semifinal

26 September Report	Malaysia	2–0	Hong Kong

Low Wee Wern	3–0	Chan Ho Ling	11–5, 11–5, 11–7
Nicol David	3–1	Annie Au	4–11, 11–5, 11–8, 11–6
Delia Arnold	Liu Tsz Ling	not played

Gold medal match

27 September Report	Malaysia	2–0	India

Delia Arnold	3–0	Anaka Alankamony	11–9, 12–10, 11–2
Nicol David	3–0	Dipika Pallikal	11–7, 11–6, 11–3
Low Wee Wern	Joshna Chinappa	not played

== Table tennis ==
Singles

Athlete	Event	Round of 64	Round of 32	Round of 16	Quarterfinal	Semifinal	Final	Rank
Athlete	Event	Opposition Score	Opposition Score	Opposition Score	Opposition Score	Opposition Score	Opposition Score	Rank
Beh Lee Wei	Women's singles	Bye	Kasumi Ishikawa (JPN); L 0 – 4; 1-11, 4-11, 6-11, 9-11	Did not advance				
Lee Rou You	Women's singles	Bye	Zhu Yuling (CHN); L 0 – 4; 5-11, 3-11, 2-11, 3-11	Did not advance				

Doubles

Athlete	Event	Round of 64	Round of 32	Round of 16	Quarterfinal	Semifinal	Final	Rank
Athlete	Event	Opposition Score	Opposition Score	Opposition Score	Opposition Score	Opposition Score	Opposition Score	Rank
Ho Ying; Lee Rou You	Women's doubles	—N/a	Lee Ho Ching (HKG); Ng Wing Nam (HKG); L 0 – 3; 4-11, 10–12, 10-12	Did not advance				

=== Women's team ===
Team	Pld	W	L	MF	MA	Pts
China	3	3	0	9	0	6
India	3	2	1	6	3	4
Malaysia	3	1	2	3	6	2
Nepal	3	0	3	0	9	0

27 September Report	Malaysia	0–3	India

Beh Lee Wei	1–3	Poulomi Ghatak	9–11, 17–15, 8–11, 5–11
Ho Ying	0–3	Manika Batra	5–11, 8–11, 7–11
Lee Rou You	0–3	Neha Aggarwal	6–11, 6–11, 4–11

27 September Report	China	3–0	Malaysia

Ding Ning	3–0	Lee Rou You	11–4, 11–6, 11–2
Liu Shiwen	3–0	Beh Lee Wei	11–3, 11–5, 11–4
Wu Yang	3–0	Ho Ying	11–3, 11–8, 11–2

28 September Report	Malaysia	3–0	Nepal

Lee Rou You	3–0	Rabina Maharjan	11–3, 11–5, 11–2
Ho Ying	3–0	Rita Maiya Prajapati	11–4, 11–7, 11–9
Beh Lee Wei	3–0	Shrestha Nabita	11–2, 11–4, 11–4

== Taekwondo ==
Men

Athlete	Event	Round of 32	Round of 16	Quarterfinal	Semifinal	Final	Rank
Athlete	Event	Opposition Score	Opposition Score	Opposition Score	Opposition Score	Opposition Score	Rank
Ryan Chong Wy Lunn	Bantamweight (63 kg)	Bye	Chen Yen-ming (TPE); L 2 – 3	Did not advance			
Thinagaran Naidu Papunaidu	Featherweight (68 kg)	Kairat Sarymsakov (KAZ); L 2 – 16	Did not advance				

Women

Athlete	Event	Round of 32	Round of 16	Quarterfinal	Semifinal	Final	Rank
Athlete	Event	Opposition Score	Opposition Score	Opposition Score	Opposition Score	Opposition Score	Rank
Nur Dhia Liyana Shaharuddin	Flyweight (49 kg)	—N/a	Yan Kumari Chaulagain (NEP); W 7 – 2	Sun Nuei-ning (TPE); L 0 – 16	Did not advance		

== Volleyball ==
=== Beach volleyball ===
Men

Athlete	Preliminary	Rank	Round of 16	Quarterfinals	Semifinals	Final	Rank
Mohd Aizzat Mohd Zokri; Raja Nazmi Saifuddin Raja Hussin	Hitoshi Murakami (JPN); Takumi Takahashi (JPN); L 0 - 2; 12-21, 13-21	3	Did not advance				17
Mohd Aizzat Mohd Zokri; Raja Nazmi Saifuddin Raja Hussin	Halikejiang (CHN); Bao Jian (CHN); L 0 - 2; 17-21, 14-21	3	Did not advance				17
Mohd Aizzat Mohd Zokri; Raja Nazmi Saifuddin Raja Hussin	Gaudencio Duarte Fernandes Xavier (TLS); Adriano Da Ressureicao Correia (TLS); W 2 - 0; 21-15, 21-13	3	Did not advance				17
Mohd Razif Mahadi; Rafi Asruki Nordin	Alexandr Dyachenko (KAZ); Alexey Sidorenko (KAZ); L 0 - 2; 9-21, 13-21	2 Q	Ade Candra Rachmawan (INA); Koko Prasetyo Darkuncoro (INA); L 0 - 2; 11-21, 13-21	Did not advance			9
Mohd Razif Mahadi; Rafi Asruki Nordin	Mazin Sulaiman Zahran Hashmi (OMA); Faisal Said Abdullah Subhi (OMA); W 2 - 0; 21-13, 21-19	2 Q	Ade Candra Rachmawan (INA); Koko Prasetyo Darkuncoro (INA); L 0 - 2; 11-21, 13-21	Did not advance			9

== Weightlifting ==
Men

Athlete	Event	Snatch		Clean & jerk		Total	Rank
Athlete	Event	Result	Rank	Result	Rank	Total	Rank
Zulhelmi Md Pisol	56 kg	108	12	140	9	248	11

== Wushu ==
Taolu

Athlete	Event	Nanquan Score Rank	Nangun Score Rank	Total	Rank
Ho Mun Hua	Men's nanquan and nangun all-round	9.62; 7	9.62; 7	19.24	7

Athlete	Event	Nandao Score Rank	Nanquan Score Rank	Total	Rank
Diana Bong Siong Lin	Women's nandao and nanquan all-round	9.20; 10	9.05; 12	18.25	12
Tai Cheau Xuen	Women's nandao and nanquan all-round	9.62; 3	9.61; 1	19.23	DSQ

Athlete	Event	Taijijian Score Rank	Taijiquan Score Rank	Total	Rank
Jack Loh Chang	Men's taijijian and taijiquan all-round	9.60; 7	9.35; 11	18.95	10
Lee Yang	Men's taijijian and taijiquan all-round	9.62; 3	9.52; 6	19.24	5
Ng Shin Yii	Women's taijijian and taijiquan all-round	9.53; 6	9.63; 4	19.16	6

Athlete	Event	Jianshu Score Rank	Qiangshu Score Rank	Total	Rank
Phoon Eyin	Women's jianshu and qiangshu all-round	9.58; 5	9.56; 4	19.14	5

Sanshou

Athlete	Event	Round of 16	Quarterfinal	Semifinal	Final	Rank
Athlete	Event	Opposition Score	Opposition Score	Opposition Score	Opposition Score	Rank
Lee Wei Loong	Men's sanshou 56 kg	Wong Ting Hong (HKG); L 0 - 2	Did not advance			
