= Bowling at the 2014 Asian Games – Women's masters =

Women's masters at the 2014 Asian Games
- Venue: Anyang Hogye Gymnasium
- Date: 1–2 October 2014
- Competitors: 16 from 10 nations

Medalists
gold medal	Lee Na-young	South Korea
silver medal	Wang Ya-ting	Chinese Taipei
bronze medal	Son Yun-hee	South Korea

The women's masters competition at the 2014 Asian Games in Incheon was held on 1 and 2 October 2014 at Anyang Hogye Gymnasium.

The Masters event comprises the top 16 bowlers (maximum two per country) from the all-events competition.

== Schedule ==
All times are Korea Standard Time (UTC+09:00)

Date	Time	Event
Wednesday, 1 October 2014	13:00	1st block
Thursday, 2 October 2014	08:00	2nd block
Thursday, 2 October 2014	16:00	Stepladder final round 1
Thursday, 2 October 2014	16:00	Stepladder final round 2

== Results ==
=== Preliminary ===
Rank	Athlete	Game																Total
Rank	Athlete	1	2	3	4	5	6	7	8	9	10	11	12	13	14	15	16	Total
1	Lee Na-young (KOR)	213; 0	182; 10	221; 10	199; 10	203; 0	212; 10	216; 10	201; 0	225; 10	206; 10	233; 10	241; 10	190; 0	213; 10	195; 0	214; 10	3474
2	Son Yun-hee (KOR)	236; 10	225; 10	223; 10	182; 0	212; 10	204; 0	187; 0	202; 0	238; 10	152; 0	210; 10	227; 10	211; 10	227; 10	220; 10	193; 0	3449
3	Wang Ya-ting (TPE)	156; 0	211; 10	211; 10	182; 5	190; 10	226; 10	224; 10	176; 0	220; 0	237; 10	196; 10	191; 0	228; 10	235; 10	196; 0	204; 0	3378
4	Sharon Limansantoso (INA)	202; 0	207; 10	183; 0	193; 10	206; 10	206; 0	194; 10	218; 10	219; 10	159; 0	225; 10	225; 0	180; 0	213; 10	179; 10	212; 10	3321
5	Chan Shuk Han (HKG)	177; 0	201; 10	192; 10	200; 10	173; 0	213; 10	181; 0	183; 10	190; 0	215; 10	203; 0	257; 10	193; 0	175; 0	238; 10	236; 10	3317
6	Yang Suiling (CHN)	204; 0	196; 10	167; 0	213; 0	215; 10	246; 10	212; 10	174; 0	213; 0	185; 0	190; 0	216; 10	205; 0	206; 10	157; 0	225; 10	3294
7	Haruka Matsuda (JPN)	210; 10	178; 0	203; 0	141; 0	196; 0	240; 10	166; 0	182; 0	191; 0	214; 10	245; 10	197; 0	204; 10	194; 0	244; 10	199; 10	3274
8	Shalin Zulkifli (MAS)	174; 0	181; 0	199; 10	212; 10	226; 10	169; 0	200; 10	223; 10	226; 10	162; 0	191; 0	215; 10	202; 10	175; 0	221; 10	200; 0	3266
9	Jazreel Tan (SIN)	163; 0	177; 10	215; 0	154; 0	232; 10	204; 10	181; 0	187; 0	175; 10	179; 10	207; 0	210; 0	223; 10	223; 0	223; 10	223; 0	3246
10	Jane Sin (MAS)	221; 10	181; 0	201; 10	218; 10	213; 0	155; 0	212; 0	231; 10	228; 10	153; 0	198; 0	203; 10	187; 10	212; 10	172; 0	171; 0	3236
11	Cherie Tan (SIN)	179; 10	187; 0	197; 0	199; 0	171; 0	167; 0	168; 0	176; 0	173; 0	203; 0	240; 10	212; 10	198; 10	223; 10	247; 10	195; 0	3195
12	Putty Armein (INA)	204; 10	162; 0	214; 10	182; 5	209; 10	172; 0	176; 10	207; 10	175; 10	197; 10	209; 10	184; 0	132; 0	236; 10	201; 0	216; 10	3181
13	Angkana Netrviseth (THA)	168; 10	189; 10	178; 0	204; 10	201; 0	183; 0	180; 0	201; 10	174; 0	183; 10	225; 10	200; 10	185; 0	187; 0	193; 0	217; 10	3148
14	Zhang Yuhong (CHN)	214; 10	169; 0	197; 0	196; 10	197; 0	201; 10	201; 10	185; 10	193; 10	171; 0	182; 0	192; 0	191; 10	188; 0	179; 0	202; 0	3128
15	Chou Chia-chen (TPE)	160; 10	178; 0	190; 0	190; 0	233; 10	173; 0	181; 10	186; 10	148; 0	204; 10	203; 0	208; 0	170; 0	190; 0	222; 10	204; 0	3100
16	Alexis Sy (PHI)	158; 0	183; 0	205; 10	149; 0	183; 0	192; 10	157; 0	150; 0	167; 0	195; 0	230; 0	172; 0	162; 0	202; 0	193; 0	225; 10	2953

=== Stepladder finals ===
Stepladder final round 1			Stepladder final round 2
			1	Lee Na-young (KOR)	223	254	477
2	Son Yun-hee (KOR)	190	3	Wang Ya-ting (TPE)	202	235	437
3	Wang Ya-ting (TPE)	193
