= Diving at the 2014 Asian Games – Men's 10 metre platform =

Men's 10 metre platform at the 2014 Asian Games
- Venue: Munhak Park Tae-hwan Aquatics Center
- Date: 3 October 2014
- Competitors: 10 from 5 nations

Medalists
gold medal	Qiu Bo	China
silver medal	Yang Jian	China
bronze medal	Woo Ha-ram	South Korea

The men's 10 metre platform diving competition at the 2014 Asian Games in Incheon was held on 3 October at the Munhak Park Tae-hwan Aquatics Center.

== Schedule ==
All times are Korea Standard Time (UTC+09:00)

Date	Time	Event
Friday, 3 October 2014	12:00	Preliminary
Friday, 3 October 2014	16:00	Final

== Results ==
=== Preliminary ===
Rank	Athlete	Dive						Total
Rank	Athlete	1	2	3	4	5	6	Total
1	Yang Jian (CHN)	89.25	79.90	92.75	99.00	88.20	104.55	553.65
2	Qiu Bo (CHN)	96.25	91.00	91.80	100.80	77.70	91.20	548.75
3	Kim Yeong-nam (KOR)	72.00	76.80	75.60	76.50	65.10	91.80	457.80
4	Ooi Tze Liang (MAS)	65.60	76.80	67.50	74.25	76.50	76.80	437.45
5	Yu Okamoto (JPN)	67.20	76.50	80.00	62.40	71.40	73.80	431.30
6	Woo Ha-ram (KOR)	75.60	76.50	76.80	47.60	91.80	54.25	422.55
7	Kazuki Murakami (JPN)	76.80	67.20	79.20	64.75	39.10	78.40	405.45
8	Hyon Il-myong (PRK)	72.00	72.00	57.80	34.20	78.40	64.80	379.20
9	Ri Hyon-ju (PRK)	70.40	51.80	66.30	90.00	68.40	29.75	376.65
10	Chew Yiwei (MAS)	63.00	65.60	42.90	68.80	23.80	62.40	326.50

=== Final ===
Rank	Athlete	Dive						Total
Rank	Athlete	1	2	3	4	5	6	Total
1st place, gold medalist(s)	Qiu Bo (CHN)	84.00	96.25	102.00	91.80	105.45	96.90	576.40
2nd place, silver medalist(s)	Yang Jian (CHN)	84.00	90.10	75.25	84.60	86.40	106.60	526.95
3rd place, bronze medalist(s)	Woo Ha-ram (KOR)	86.40	76.50	78.40	90.10	93.60	74.40	499.40
4	Kim Yeong-nam (KOR)	66.00	70.40	86.40	85.00	69.75	75.60	453.15
5	Kazuki Murakami (JPN)	76.80	72.00	75.60	69.00	76.50	76.80	446.70
6	Hyon Il-myong (PRK)	75.00	76.80	69.70	73.80	70.40	75.60	441.30
7	Ooi Tze Liang (MAS)	78.40	72.00	70.50	29.70	85.00	78.40	414.00
8	Chew Yiwei (MAS)	69.00	67.20	72.60	76.80	44.20	76.80	406.60
9	Ri Hyon-ju (PRK)	67.20	53.65	76.50	82.80	77.40	42.00	399.55
10	Yu Okamoto (JPN)	76.80	76.50	24.00	72.00	47.60	82.80	379.70
