= Sailing at the 2014 Asian Games – Boys' Optimist =

Boys' Optimist at the 2014 Asian Games
- Venue: Wangsan Marina
- Date: 24–30 September 2014
- Competitors: 10 from 10 nations

Medalists
| gold medal | Park Sung-bin | South Korea |
| silver medal | Raynn Kwok | Singapore |
| bronze medal | Suthon Yampinid | Thailand |

The boys' Optimist competition at the 2014 Asian Games in Incheon was held from 24 to 30 September 2014. It was an under-16 event and boys born on or after 1 January 1999 were eligible to compete.

== Schedule ==
All times are Korea Standard Time (UTC+09:00)

| Date | Time | Event |
|---|---|---|
| Wednesday, 24 September 2014 | 12:00 | Race 1 |
| Wednesday, 24 September 2014 | 12:00 | Race 2 |
| Wednesday, 24 September 2014 | 12:00 | Race 3 |
| Wednesday, 24 September 2014 | 12:00 | Race 4 |
| Thursday, 25 September 2014 | 11:00 | Race 5 |
| Thursday, 25 September 2014 | 11:00 | Race 6 |
| Friday, 26 September 2014 | 11:00 | Race 7 |
| Friday, 26 September 2014 | 11:00 | Race 8 |
| Saturday, 27 September 2014 | 11:00 | Race 9 |
| Saturday, 27 September 2014 | 11:00 | Race 10 |
| Tuesday, 30 September 2014 | 11:00 | Race 11 |
| Tuesday, 30 September 2014 | 11:00 | Race 12 |

== Results ==
Legend

- DNE — Non-excludable disqualification
- DSQ — Disqualification
- OCS — On course side
- RAF — Retired after finishing

| Rank | Athlete | Race | | | | | | | | | | | | Total |
| Rank | Athlete | 1 | 2 | 3 | 4 | 5 | 6 | 7 | 8 | 9 | 10 | 11 | 12 | Total |
|---|---|---|---|---|---|---|---|---|---|---|---|---|---|---|
| 1st place, gold medalist(s) | Park Sung-bin (KOR) | 2 | 1 | 1 | 2 | 2 | 2 | ~~(11)~~; DSQ | 1 | 1 | 1 | 1 | 2 | 16 |
| 2nd place, silver medalist(s) | Raynn Kwok (SIN) | ~~(11)~~; OCS | 4 | 2 | 3 | 1 | 3 | 4 | 3 | 5 | 3 | 3 | 5 | 36 |
| 3rd place, bronze medalist(s) | Suthon Yampinid (THA) | 3 | 3 | 3 | 7 | 4 | 1 | 2 | 2 | 4 | 4 | ~~(11)~~; DSQ | 4 | 37 |
| 4 | Dhiauddin Rozaini (MAS) | 1 | 2 | 4 | 1 | 5 | ~~(11)~~; OCS | 1 | 6 | 2 | 2 | 11; DSQ | 3 | 38 |
| 5 | Wang Jie (CHN) | 4 | 5 | 5 | 4 | 3 | ~~(11)~~; OCS | 3 | 4 | 3 | 6 | 2 | 1 | 40 |
| 6 | Chitresh Tatha (IND) | ~~(11)~~; OCS | 6 | 6 | 6 | 6 | 5 | 5 | 5 | 8 | 5 | 4 | 6 | 62 |
| 7 | Zakariya Al-Wahabi (OMA) | 5 | ~~(11)~~; DSQ | 7 | 5 | 11; DNE | 4 | 6 | 7 | 6 | 8 | 5 | 7 | 71 |
| 8 | Mohamed Al-Hammadi (UAE) | ~~(11)~~; OCS | 7 | 9 | 8 | 7 | 6 | 8 | 8 | 7 | 7 | 6 | 8 | 81 |
| 9 | Ghanim Al-Suwaidi (QAT) | ~~(11)~~; OCS | 8 | 8 | 9 | 8 | 7 | 7 | 9 | 11; OCS | 9 | 7 | 9 | 92 |
| 10 | Abdulaziz Al-Mojbel (KSA) | 6 | ~~(11)~~; DSQ | 11; DSQ | 11; RAF | 11; DSQ | 11; DSQ | 9 | 10 | 9 | 10 | 8 | 10 | 106 |
