= Diving at the 2018 Asian Games – Men's 10 metre platform =

Men's 10 metre platform at the 2018 Asian Games
- Venue: Gelora Bung Karno Aquatic Stadium
- Date: 1 September 2018
- Competitors: 10 from 7 nations

Medalists
gold medal	Yang Jian	China
silver medal	Qiu Bo	China
bronze medal	Woo Ha-ram	South Korea

The men's 10 metre platform competition at the 2018 Asian Games took place on 1 September 2018 at the Gelora Bung Karno Aquatic Stadium.

== Schedule ==
All times are Western Indonesia Time (UTC+07:00)

Date	Time	Event
Saturday, 1 September 2018	14:15	Preliminary
Saturday, 1 September 2018	20:50	Final

== Results ==
=== Preliminary ===
Rank	Athlete	Dive						Total
Rank	Athlete	1	2	3	4	5	6	Total
1	Qiu Bo (CHN)	80.00	96.90	89.30	101.50	95.40	98.05	561.15
2	Yang Jian (CHN)	64.75	81.60	91.20	91.00	99.00	104.55	532.10
3	Woo Ha-ram (KOR)	72.00	76.50	86.40	59.50	85.10	79.80	459.30
4	Kim Yeong-nam (KOR)	76.80	69.70	77.40	64.80	85.10	81.00	454.80
5	Hyon Il-myong (PRK)	78.40	71.40	77.00	79.20	51.80	75.60	433.40
6	Kazuki Murakami (JPN)	78.40	72.00	74.25	69.00	54.40	76.80	424.85
7	Jellson Jabillin (MAS)	60.00	76.80	49.00	61.05	67.20	76.80	390.85
8	Rim Kum-song (PRK)	65.60	73.10	63.00	57.75	78.40	38.85	376.70
9	Siddharth Pardeshi (IND)	60.00	72.00	72.00	72.00	62.40	37.80	376.20
10	Conrad Lewandowski (THA)	48.00	44.95	50.40	60.20	54.40	65.60	323.55

=== Final ===
Rank	Athlete	Dive						Total
Rank	Athlete	1	2	3	4	5	6	Total
1st place, gold medalist(s)	Yang Jian (CHN)	87.50	86.70	102.60	98.00	93.60	110.70	579.10
2nd place, silver medalist(s)	Qiu Bo (CHN)	91.20	83.30	96.90	103.25	82.80	109.15	566.60
3rd place, bronze medalist(s)	Woo Ha-ram (KOR)	78.40	86.70	90.00	61.25	81.40	79.80	477.55
4	Kim Yeong-nam (KOR)	83.20	61.20	86.40	72.00	86.95	72.00	461.75
5	Hyon Il-myong (PRK)	78.40	56.10	68.25	86.40	75.85	86.40	451.40
6	Rim Kum-song (PRK)	76.80	79.90	21.60	64.75	78.40	77.70	399.15
7	Kazuki Murakami (JPN)	76.80	57.60	84.15	70.50	27.20	70.40	386.65
8	Jellson Jabillin (MAS)	52.50	67.20	60.20	64.35	60.80	80.00	385.05
9	Siddharth Pardeshi (IND)	67.50	49.60	73.60	72.00	64.00	48.60	375.30
10	Conrad Lewandowski (THA)	63.00	60.90	51.80	67.20	28.80	52.80	324.50
