= Sailing at the 2014 Asian Games – Boys' 420 =

Boys' 420 at the 2014 Asian Games
- Venue: Wangsan Marina
- Date: 24–30 September 2014
- Competitors: 18 from 9 nations

Medalists
gold medal	Faizal Norizan; Ahmad Syukri Abdul Aziz	Malaysia
silver medal	Ibuki Koizumi; Kotaro Matsuo	Japan
bronze medal	Loh Jia Yi; Jonathan Yeo	Singapore

The boys' 420 competition at the 2014 Asian Games in Incheon was held from 24 to 30 September 2014. It was an under-19 event and sailors born on or after 1 January 1996 were eligible to compete.

== Schedule ==
All times are Korea Standard Time (UTC+09:00)

Date	Time	Event
Wednesday, 24 September 2014	12:00	Race 1
Wednesday, 24 September 2014	12:00	Race 2
Wednesday, 24 September 2014	12:00	Race 3
Wednesday, 24 September 2014	12:00	Race 4
Thursday, 25 September 2014	11:00	Race 5
Friday, 26 September 2014	11:00	Race 6
Friday, 26 September 2014	11:00	Race 7
Friday, 26 September 2014	11:00	Race 8
Saturday, 27 September 2014	11:00	Race 9
Saturday, 27 September 2014	11:00	Race 10
Tuesday, 30 September 2014	11:00	Race 11
Tuesday, 30 September 2014	11:00	Race 12

== Results ==
Legend

- RAF — Retired after finishing

Rank	Team	Race												Total
Rank	Team	1	2	3	4	5	6	7	8	9	10	11	12	Total
1st place, gold medalist(s)	Malaysia (MAS); Faizal Norizan; Ahmad Syukri Abdul Aziz	1	1	2	3	1	1	3	~~(4)~~	1	1	1	2	17
2nd place, silver medalist(s)	Japan (JPN); Ibuki Koizumi; Kotaro Matsuo	2	3	1	2	3	2	2	2	3	2	~~(4)~~	1	23
3rd place, bronze medalist(s)	Singapore (SIN); Loh Jia Yi; Jonathan Yeo	4	4	3	1	2	~~(5)~~	5	3	4	3	2	5	36
4	Hong Kong (HKG); Tse Sui Lun; Chik Ho Yin	3	2	4	4	4	4	~~(6)~~	1	5	4	3	4	38
5	Thailand (THA); Jirawat Jadklay; Sarawut Phetsiri	5	~~(8)~~	5	8	5	6	4	6	6	5	5	6	61
6	China (CHN); Lan Jingcheng; Zhou Weijie	~~(8)~~	7	6	6	6	3	7	5	7	6	6	3	62
7	India (IND); Upamanyu Dutta; Arosh Chaudhari	7	6	~~(8)~~	5	8	8	1	7	2	7	7	8	66
8	South Korea (KOR); Kim Woo-yop; Kim In-su	6	5	7	7	7	7	~~(8)~~	8	8	8	8	7	78
9	Qatar (QAT); Abdulrahman Al-Nasr; Ali Abdulla Al-Muftah	~~(10)~~; RAF	10; RAF	10; RAF	10; RAF	9	10; RAF	10; RAF	10; RAF	9	9	9	9	105
