= Bowling at the 2014 Asian Games – Women's doubles =

Women's doubles at the 2014 Asian Games
- Venue: Anyang Hogye Gymnasium
- Date: 26 September 2014
- Competitors: 72 from 13 nations

Medalists
gold medal	Lee Na-young; Son Yun-hee	South Korea
silver medal	Jane Sin; Shalin Zulkifli	Malaysia
bronze medal	Lee Yeong-seung; Jung Da-wun	South Korea

The women's doubles competition at the 2014 Asian Games in Incheon was held on 26 September 2014 at Anyang Hogye Gymnasium.

== Schedule ==
All times are Korea Standard Time (UTC+09:00)

Date	Time	Event
Friday, 26 September 2014	09:00	Squad A
Friday, 26 September 2014	14:30	Squad B

== Results ==
Rank	Team	Game						Total
Rank	Team	1	2	3	4	5	6	Total
1st place, gold medalist(s)	South Korea 3 (KOR)	424	434	370	480	416	429	2553
	Lee Na-young	222	199	160	212	236	214	1243
	Son Yun-hee	202	235	210	268	180	215	1310
2nd place, silver medalist(s)	Malaysia 1 (MAS)	376	373	421	446	453	449	2518
	Jane Sin	201	206	200	243	223	216	1289
	Shalin Zulkifli	175	167	221	203	230	233	1229
3rd place, bronze medalist(s)	South Korea 2 (KOR)	420	386	388	396	422	450	2462
	Lee Yeong-seung	195	181	188	199	213	248	1224
	Jung Da-wun	225	205	200	197	209	202	1238
4	Singapore 3 (SIN)	378	399	471	385	427	387	2447
	New Hui Fen	192	196	243	197	212	184	1224
	Jazreel Tan	186	203	228	188	215	203	1223
5	Indonesia 3 (INA)	379	444	442	339	419	410	2433
	Sharon Limansantoso	184	234	246	143	212	222	1241
	Putty Armein	195	210	196	196	207	188	1192
6	Singapore 2 (SIN)	368	382	405	423	438	408	2424
	Cherie Tan	203	186	212	237	203	209	1250
	Shayna Ng	165	196	193	186	235	199	1174
7	Thailand 2 (THA)	373	408	406	360	438	411	2396
	Korngunya Aree	171	202	234	150	247	196	1200
	Angkana Netrviseth	202	206	172	210	191	215	1196
8	South Korea 1 (KOR)	384	364	395	378	404	443	2368
	Jeon Eun-hee	149	183	193	184	218	255	1182
	Kim Jin-sun	235	181	202	194	186	188	1186
9	China 2 (CHN)	399	351	354	432	396	433	2365
	Yang Suiling	226	181	191	246	194	254	1292
	Zhang Yuhong	173	170	163	186	202	179	1073
10	Japan 3 (JPN)	373	340	415	448	402	374	2352
	Kanako Ishimine	169	190	212	220	179	202	1172
	Misaki Mukotani	204	150	203	228	223	172	1180
11	Malaysia 2 (MAS)	432	417	383	340	373	406	2351
	Hee Kar Yen	214	211	197	203	182	196	1203
	Siti Safiyah	218	206	186	137	191	210	1148
12	Japan 1 (JPN)	361	388	414	407	393	371	2334
	Natsuki Teshima	172	174	235	210	178	182	1151
	Haruka Matsuda	189	214	179	197	215	189	1183
13	Chinese Taipei 2 (TPE)	367	371	407	385	361	420	2311
	Tsai Hsin-yi	173	172	182	171	157	216	1071
	Wang Ya-ting	194	199	225	214	204	204	1240
14	Macau 3 (MAC)	372	369	363	449	373	384	2310
	Julia Lam	187	181	184	237	192	172	1153
	Hui Tong	185	188	179	212	181	212	1157
15	Chinese Taipei 1 (TPE)	395	359	292	449	403	410	2308
	Chou Chia-chen	218	202	131	246	223	201	1221
	Chang Yu-hsuan	177	157	161	203	180	209	1087
16	Indonesia 1 (INA)	428	352	415	334	373	404	2306
	Novie Phang	202	192	222	162	151	189	1118
	Tannya Roumimper	226	160	193	172	222	215	1188
17	Malaysia 3 (MAS)	391	380	337	420	437	338	2303
	Esther Cheah	177	161	173	191	225	160	1087
	Syaidatul Afifah	214	219	164	229	212	178	1216
18	China 3 (CHN)	404	353	395	365	363	413	2293
	Sun Hongdou	192	164	213	161	146	245	1121
	Zhang Chunli	212	189	182	204	217	168	1172
19	Japan 2 (JPN)	336	376	426	393	399	360	2290
	Mitsuki Okamoto	165	175	210	210	195	178	1133
	Hikaru Takekawa	171	201	216	183	204	182	1157
20	Philippines 2 (PHI)	316	418	406	385	363	386	2274
	Liza del Rosario	144	214	227	214	179	161	1139
	Lara Posadas	172	204	179	171	184	225	1135
21	China 1 (CHN)	364	331	378	395	390	409	2267
	Kong Min	191	170	192	213	167	185	1118
	Li Ling	173	161	186	182	223	224	1149
22	Chinese Taipei 3 (TPE)	350	417	313	387	338	420	2225
	Chien Hsiu-lan	174	216	175	203	168	221	1157
	Pan Yu-fen	176	201	138	184	170	199	1068
23	Hong Kong 1 (HKG)	365	371	372	340	379	394	2221
	Milki Ng	172	195	170	163	187	200	1087
	Chan Shuk Han	193	176	202	177	192	194	1134
24	Philippines 1 (PHI)	368	352	380	443	324	348	2215
	Anne Marie Kiac	164	148	204	185	145	160	1006
	Liza Clutario	204	204	176	258	179	188	1209
25	Philippines 3 (PHI)	364	384	368	355	336	366	2173
	Alexis Sy	220	172	200	187	185	196	1160
	Krizziah Tabora	144	212	168	168	151	170	1013
26	Singapore 1 (SIN)	344	370	332	343	358	413	2160
	Joey Yeo	184	172	149	172	180	201	1058
	Daphne Tan	160	198	183	171	178	212	1102
27	Indonesia 2 (INA)	294	413	368	376	348	341	2140
	Cheya Chantika	135	181	169	191	155	178	1009
	Alisha Nabila Larasati	159	232	199	185	193	163	1131
28	Hong Kong 2 (HKG)	353	329	353	416	339	346	2136
	Zoe Tam	192	183	199	200	192	161	1127
	Joan Cheng	161	146	154	216	147	185	1009
29	Macau 1 (MAC)	338	368	328	321	373	403	2131
	Filomena Choi	188	212	146	165	181	226	1118
	Ku Sok Va	150	156	182	156	192	177	1013
30	Thailand 1 (THA)	367	338	364	336	335	368	2108
	Tanaprang Sathean	168	161	174	148	180	167	998
	Arpakorn Netrviseth	199	177	190	188	155	201	1110
31	Macau 2 (MAC)	340	365	344	290	300	323	1962
	Au Man Wai	173	147	170	138	156	183	967
	Veronica de Souza	167	218	174	152	144	140	995
32	Mongolia 2 (MGL)	280	310	329	372	322	325	1938
	Khalzangiin Ölziikhorol	148	161	155	153	178	161	956
	Samdangiin Delgertsetseg	132	149	174	219	144	164	982
33	Kuwait 3 (KUW)	339	298	305	302	369	291	1904
	Fatima Mohammad	179	171	189	160	190	146	1035
	Shaikha Al-Hendi	160	127	116	142	179	145	869
34	Mongolia 1 (MGL)	256	300	244	234	301	265	1600
	Luvsandagvyn Tsetsegsüren	135	147	113	111	134	117	757
	Terveegiin Dorjderem	121	153	131	123	167	148	843
35	Kuwait 1 (KUW)	247	236	217	242	282	264	1488
	Rawan Al-Omani	107	116	105	94	113	131	666
	Hessah Al-Juraied	140	120	112	148	169	133	822
36	Kuwait 2 (KUW)	137	117	102	168	116	132	772
	Altaf Karam	137	117	102	168	116	132	772
	Aseel Mohammad	0	0	0	0	0	0	0
Individuals
	Kritsanakorn Sangaroon (THA)	159	213	147	197	159	193	1068
	Maleha Al-Azzani (YEM)	144	137	109	120	143	95	748
