= Karate at the 2014 Asian Games – Men's kata =

Karate competition

Men's kata at the 2014 Asian Games
- Venue: Gyeyang Gymnasium
- Date: 2 October 2014
- Competitors: 14 from 14 nations

Medalists
gold medal	Lim Chee Wei	Malaysia
silver medal	Fidelys Lolobua	Indonesia
bronze medal	Issei Shimbaba	Japan
bronze medal	Marwan Al-Maazmi	United Arab Emirates

The men's individual kata competition at the 2014 Asian Games in Incheon, South Korea was held on 2 October 2014 at the Gyeyang Gymnasium.

== Schedule ==
All times are Korea Standard Time (UTC+09:00)

Date	Time	Event
Thursday, 2 October 2014	09:30	1/8 finals
Thursday, 2 October 2014	09:30	Quarterfinals
Thursday, 2 October 2014	09:30	Semifinals
Thursday, 2 October 2014	09:30	Final of repechage
Thursday, 2 October 2014	09:30	Finals

== Results ==
Legend

- K — Won by kiken

=== Main bracket ===
1/8 finals
Issei Shimbaba (JPN)	5
Perman Işanow (TKM)	0
Wang Yi-ta (TPE)	2
Kuok Kin Hang (MAC)	3
Parshu Ram Bastola (NEP)	K
Abdullah Al-Harbi (KSA)
Amkha Vongphachan (LAO)	5
Baz Muhammad (PAK)	0
Chris Cheng (HKG)	4
James delos Santos (PHI)	1
Fidelys Lolobua (INA)	4
Adham Abdulnasser (QAT)	1

Quarterfinals
Issei Shimbaba (JPN)	5
Kuok Kin Hang (MAC)	0
Parshu Ram Bastola (NEP)	0
Lim Chee Wei (MAS)	5
Amkha Vongphachan (LAO)	2
Chris Cheng (HKG)	3
Fidelys Lolobua (INA)	3
Marwan Al-Maazmi (UAE)	2

Semifinals
Issei Shimbaba (JPN)	1
Lim Chee Wei (MAS)	4
Chris Cheng (HKG)	0
Fidelys Lolobua (INA)	5

Final
Lim Chee Wei (MAS)	3
Fidelys Lolobua (INA)	2

=== Repechage ===
Final of repechage
Adham Abdulnasser (QAT)	0
Marwan Al-Maazmi (UAE)	5

Bronze medal contest
Parshu Ram Bastola (NEP)	0
Issei Shimbaba (JPN)	5
Marwan Al-Maazmi (UAE)	3
Chris Cheng (HKG)	2
