= Ibuki Koizumi =

Japanese sailor (born 1996)

Personal information
- Nationality: Japanese
- Born: 1 September 1996 (age 29)

Sailing career
- Sport: Sailing
Medal record
Men's sailing
Representing Japan
Asian Games
Silver medal – second place	2014 Incheon	420

Ibuki Koizumi (Japanese: 小泉 維吹, Koizumi Ibuki, born 1 September 1996) is a Japanese sailor. He competed in the 49er event at the 2020 Summer Olympics.
