= Bowling at the 2014 Asian Games – Women's singles =

Women's singles at the 2014 Asian Games
- Venue: Anyang Hogye Gymnasium
- Date: 24 September 2014
- Competitors: 74 from 14 nations

Medalists
gold medal	Chou Chia-chen	Chinese Taipei
silver medal	Jazreel Tan	Singapore
bronze medal	Lee Na-young	South Korea

The women's singles competition at the 2014 Asian Games in Incheon was held on 24 September 2014 at Anyang Hogye Gymnasium.

== Schedule ==
All times are Korea Standard Time (UTC+09:00)

Date	Time	Event
Wednesday, 24 September 2014	09:00	Squad A
Wednesday, 24 September 2014	14:30	Squad B

== Results ==
Rank	Athlete	Game						Total
Rank	Athlete	1	2	3	4	5	6	Total
1st place, gold medalist(s)	Chou Chia-chen (TPE)	217	216	268	203	230	157	1291
2nd place, silver medalist(s)	Jazreel Tan (SIN)	245	199	203	178	196	256	1277
3rd place, bronze medalist(s)	Lee Na-young (KOR)	211	226	226	196	190	223	1272
4	New Hui Fen (SIN)	210	234	206	215	190	216	1271
5	Esther Cheah (MAS)	218	194	212	188	245	198	1255
6	Zhang Yuhong (CHN)	183	244	234	183	166	244	1254
7	Yang Suiling (CHN)	201	213	203	223	200	210	1250
8	Sharon Limansantoso (INA)	221	180	248	193	203	201	1246
9	Daphne Tan (SIN)	245	206	183	169	212	224	1239
10	Son Yun-hee (KOR)	224	225	183	203	197	205	1237
11	Lee Yeong-seung (KOR)	197	226	204	169	248	192	1236
12	Jung Da-wun (KOR)	215	200	206	187	224	202	1234
13	Jane Sin (MAS)	235	180	184	231	191	211	1232
14	Putty Armein (INA)	201	208	203	201	224	188	1225
14	Haruka Matsuda (JPN)	194	158	222	205	199	247	1225
16	Chang Yu-hsuan (TPE)	216	206	204	189	204	203	1222
17	Cherie Tan (SIN)	195	211	194	201	216	202	1219
17	Kim Jin-sun (KOR)	212	195	224	179	217	192	1219
19	Joey Yeo (SIN)	175	215	184	183	212	236	1205
20	Syaidatul Afifah (MAS)	180	199	207	224	212	182	1204
20	Wang Ya-ting (TPE)	185	225	178	199	204	213	1204
22	Tsai Hsin-yi (TPE)	211	193	175	190	205	228	1202
23	Siti Safiyah (MAS)	201	243	194	195	180	185	1198
24	Hee Kar Yen (MAS)	205	200	201	213	183	182	1184
25	Novie Phang (INA)	188	189	194	217	210	182	1180
26	Chien Hsiu-lan (TPE)	190	194	183	201	194	215	1177
26	Pan Yu-fen (TPE)	171	228	196	174	195	213	1177
28	Natsuki Teshima (JPN)	202	212	169	199	208	186	1176
28	Chan Shuk Han (HKG)	212	214	174	189	196	191	1176
30	Milki Ng (HKG)	191	192	190	221	180	200	1174
31	Kong Min (CHN)	186	192	206	203	180	205	1172
32	Shayna Ng (SIN)	209	192	153	221	193	191	1159
33	Lara Posadas (PHI)	237	170	176	194	200	181	1158
34	Mitsuki Okamoto (JPN)	183	179	166	201	213	215	1157
35	Liza del Rosario (PHI)	200	175	167	180	207	221	1150
36	Angkana Netrviseth (THA)	220	177	215	164	198	175	1149
37	Kritsanakorn Sangaroon (THA)	173	190	188	154	222	209	1136
38	Alexis Sy (PHI)	186	171	195	183	211	182	1128
39	Shalin Zulkifli (MAS)	161	183	187	175	219	201	1126
40	Joan Cheng (HKG)	159	214	190	181	194	184	1122
41	Misaki Mukotani (JPN)	197	155	155	188	186	233	1114
42	Tannya Roumimper (INA)	210	166	166	190	183	195	1110
43	Jeon Eun-hee (KOR)	203	171	184	167	183	199	1107
44	Korngunya Aree (THA)	178	200	192	187	171	178	1106
45	Liza Clutario (PHI)	159	171	215	179	194	184	1102
46	Zhang Chunli (CHN)	191	195	181	136	194	202	1099
47	Arpakorn Netrviseth (THA)	189	199	163	202	157	186	1096
48	Li Ling (CHN)	158	173	201	169	191	203	1095
49	Ku Sok Va (MAC)	201	188	148	178	161	212	1088
50	Hikaru Takekawa (JPN)	169	149	197	170	187	201	1073
51	Kanako Ishimine (JPN)	192	144	162	190	201	179	1068
52	Alisha Nabila Larasati (INA)	171	189	181	169	181	176	1067
52	Krizziah Tabora (PHI)	210	178	150	194	180	155	1067
54	Tanaprang Sathean (THA)	200	174	164	191	158	175	1062
55	Anne Marie Kiac (PHI)	207	148	178	191	155	181	1060
56	Cheya Chantika (INA)	157	167	191	202	172	170	1059
57	Filomena Choi (MAC)	208	149	213	155	182	144	1051
58	Veronica de Souza (MAC)	181	173	187	172	172	165	1050
59	Sun Hongdou (CHN)	163	176	159	188	173	189	1048
60	Hui Tong (MAC)	189	191	147	159	193	168	1047
61	Julia Lam (MAC)	178	181	158	167	187	171	1042
62	Au Man Wai (MAC)	159	146	189	175	182	147	998
63	Zoe Tam (HKG)	162	157	176	143	187	161	986
64	Samdangiin Delgertsetseg (MGL)	182	135	153	144	177	149	940
65	Khalzangiin Ölziikhorol (MGL)	149	148	147	160	171	159	934
66	Maleha Al-Azzani (YEM)	161	138	182	154	139	148	922
66	Shaikha Al-Hendi (KUW)	170	158	141	114	174	165	922
68	Fatima Mohammad (KUW)	181	124	166	156	134	143	904
69	Altaf Karam (KUW)	193	140	109	162	144	146	894
70	Terveegiin Dorjderem (MGL)	211	127	135	132	137	136	878
71	Luvsandagvyn Tsetsegsüren (MGL)	153	148	134	161	138	141	875
72	Hessah Al-Juraied (KUW)	120	118	152	146	142	154	832
73	Aseel Mohammad (KUW)	125	109	159	127	144	149	813
74	Rawan Al-Omani (KUW)	125	128	146	119	127	130	775
