= Lim Chee Wei =

Malaysian karateka (born 1991)

- Born: 16 January 1991 (age 35); Penang, Malaysia
- Height: 160 cm (5 ft 3 in)
- Weight: 56 kg (123 lb; 8 st 11 lb)
- Style: Karate

Lim Chee Wei (born 16 January 1991) is a Malaysian male karateka competing in the Kata division. He won the gold medal in the individual kata event at the 2014 Asian Games.
