= Bowling at the 2014 Asian Games – Women's team =

Women's team of 5 at the 2014 Asian Games
- Venue: Anyang Hogye Gymnasium
- Date: 29–30 September 2014
- Competitors: 65 from 11 nations

Medalists
gold medal	Singapore; Cherie Tan, Daphne Tan, Shayna Ng, New Hui Fen, Jazreel Tan, Joey Yeo
silver medal	South Korea; Lee Na-young, Jung Da-wun, Kim Jin-sun, Son Yun-hee, Jeon Eun-hee, Lee Yeong-seung
bronze medal	Indonesia; Tannya Roumimper, Novie Phang, Alisha Nabila Larasati, Sharon Limansantoso, Putty Armein, Cheya Chantika

The women's team of five competition at the 2014 Asian Games in Incheon was held on 29 and 30 September 2014 at Anyang Hogye Gymnasium.

== Schedule ==
All times are Korea Standard Time (UTC+09:00)

Date	Time	Event
Monday, 29 September 2014	15:00	1st block
Tuesday, 30 September 2014	09:00	2nd block

== Results ==
Rank	Team	Game						Total
Rank	Team	1	2	3	4	5	6	Total
1st place, gold medalist(s)	Singapore (SIN)	908	1103	1133	975	1016	984	6119
	Cherie Tan	194	202	247	179	165	179	1166
	Daphne Tan	160	209	235	236	206	167	1213
	Shayna Ng	186	246	214	173	203	247	1269
	New Hui Fen	201	209	212	182	197	208	1209
	Jazreel Tan	167	237	225	205	245	183	1262
2nd place, silver medalist(s)	South Korea (KOR)	1088	1003	958	1039	925	1035	6048
	Lee Na-young	228	192	183	233	204	216	1256
	Jung Da-wun	258	196	167	208	160	204	1193
	Kim Jin-sun	212	242	206	168	194	180	1202
	Son Yun-hee	211	185	213	182	177	210	1178
	Jeon Eun-hee	179	188	189				556
	Lee Yeong-seung				248	190	225	663
3rd place, bronze medalist(s)	Indonesia (INA)	918	1024	989	1020	933	956	5840
	Tannya Roumimper	182	211	215	238	172	195	1213
	Novie Phang	179	200	214	183	180	245	1201
	Alisha Nabila Larasati	161	224	214	223	198	152	1172
	Sharon Limansantoso	214	202	172	183	173	197	1141
	Putty Armein	182	187	174	193	210	167	1113
4	Chinese Taipei (TPE)	1053	1003	939	936	970	915	5816
	Chou Chia-chen	201	182	202	194	193	138	1110
	Chien Hsiu-lan	246	203	167	200	169	190	1175
	Pan Yu-fen	209	200	191	180	203	177	1160
	Tsai Hsin-yi	233	205	183	185	182	235	1223
	Wang Ya-ting	164	213	196	177	223	175	1148
5	China (CHN)	987	1034	951	932	1015	892	5811
	Sun Hongdou	193	215	184	157	221	163	1133
	Zhang Chunli	200	195	194	187	158	206	1140
	Zhang Yuhong	235	238	202	213	222	160	1270
	Yang Suiling	196	195	193	186	235	172	1177
	Li Ling	163	191	178				532
	Kong Min				189	179	191	559
6	Japan (JPN)	900	970	930	1050	973	977	5800
	Natsuki Teshima	174	191	182	226	220	176	1169
	Kanako Ishimine	194	180	165	233	187	200	1159
	Haruka Matsuda	208	216	202	208	178	162	1174
	Misaki Mukotani	160	197	201	171	189	236	1154
	Mitsuki Okamoto	164	186	180				530
	Hikaru Takekawa				212	199	203	614
7	Malaysia (MAS)	1019	916	895	947	1000	1016	5793
	Jane Sin	233	186	168	169	222	216	1194
	Syaidatul Afifah	190	170	156	199	179	182	1076
	Siti Safiyah	176	214	188	191	199	200	1168
	Hee Kar Yen	216	182	185	200	181	200	1164
	Shalin Zulkifli	204	164	198	188	219	218	1191
8	Philippines (PHI)	887	917	980	997	1010	996	5787
	Liza del Rosario	206	146	165	199	208	216	1140
	Alexis Sy	187	221	191	186	221	208	1214
	Liza Clutario	169	179	244	196	206	201	1195
	Krizziah Tabora	147	181	180	201	195	190	1094
	Lara Posadas	178	190	200	215	180	181	1144
9	Thailand (THA)	963	936	954	877	891	914	5535
	Korngunya Aree	208	167	236	160	203	168	1142
	Kritsanakorn Sangaroon	189	200	174	146	113	144	966
	Arpakorn Netrviseth	190	177	155	179	184	205	1090
	Tanaprang Sathean	205	214	188	191	190	194	1182
	Angkana Netrviseth	171	178	201	201	201	203	1155
10	Macau (MAC)	967	906	917	929	892	876	5487
	Filomena Choi	170	185	192	172	145	225	1089
	Ku Sok Va	217	162	179	210	199	151	1118
	Veronica de Souza	167	155	176	190	155	137	980
	Julia Lam	181	179	191	195	224	165	1135
	Hui Tong	232	225	179	162	169	198	1165
11	Kuwait (KUW)	713	794	718	673	712	670	4280
	Altaf Karam	163	184	155	140	106	114	862
	Hessah Al-Juraied	116	134	149	111	125	117	752
	Shaikha Al-Hendi	156	147	129	132	143	174	881
	Fatima Mohammad	158	148	195	165	202	126	994
	Rawan Al-Omani	120	181	90				391
	Aseel Mohammad				125	136	139	400
Individuals
	Kong Min (CHN)	199	224	164				587
	Li Ling (CHN)				154	163	182	499
	Chan Shuk Han (HKG)	204	190	192	180	203	244	1213
	Joan Cheng (HKG)	171	149	206	175	202	148	1051
	Milki Ng (HKG)	161	169	187	147	169	160	993
	Zoe Tam (HKG)	181	163	182	154	182	174	1036
	Cheya Chantika (INA)	170	189	210	146	222	131	1068
	Mitsuki Okamoto (JPN)				163	199	204	566
	Hikaru Takekawa (JPN)	195	168	211				574
	Jeon Eun-hee (KOR)				211	203	180	594
	Lee Yeong-seung (KOR)	278	161	184				623
	Rawan Al-Omani (KUW)				127	117	168	412
	Aseel Mohammad (KUW)	140	136	130				406
	Au Man Wai (MAC)	121	148	175	169	166	187	966
	Esther Cheah (MAS)	202	214	192	171	178	158	1115
	Samdangiin Delgertsetseg (MGL)	117	161	168	171	151	170	938
	Terveegiin Dorjderem (MGL)	177	172	135	135	124	138	881
	Khalzangiin Ölziikhorol (MGL)	146	170	147	190	169	151	973
	Luvsandagvyn Tsetsegsüren (MGL)	147	158	136	184	128	151	904
	Anne Marie Kiac (PHI)	180	185	173	164	172	185	1059
	Joey Yeo (SIN)	173	170	249	191	176	237	1196
	Chang Yu-hsuan (TPE)	213	146	203	181	200	165	1108
	Maleha Al-Azzani (YEM)	154	135	159	122	158	142	870
