= Bowling at the 2014 Asian Games – Women's trios =

Women's trios at the 2014 Asian Games
- Venue: Anyang Hogye Gymnasium
- Date: 27–28 September 2014
- Competitors: 69 from 13 nations

Medalists
gold medal	South Korea; Lee Na-young, Jung Da-wun, Son Yun-hee
silver medal	Singapore; Cherie Tan, New Hui Fen, Jazreel Tan
bronze medal	South Korea; Lee Yeong-seung, Jeon Eun-hee, Kim Jin-sun

The women's trios competition at the 2014 Asian Games in Incheon was held on 27 and 28 September 2014 at Anyang Hogye Gymnasium.

== Schedule ==
All times are Korea Standard Time (UTC+09:00)

Date	Time	Event
Saturday, 27 September 2014	18:00	1st block
Sunday, 28 September 2014	09:00	2nd block

== Results ==
Rank	Team	Game						Total
Rank	Team	1	2	3	4	5	6	Total
1st place, gold medalist(s)	South Korea 1 (KOR)	694	657	684	602	607	652	3896
	Lee Na-young	268	224	226	221	197	225	1361
	Jung Da-wun	226	168	257	197	206	213	1267
	Son Yun-hee	200	265	201	184	204	214	1268
2nd place, silver medalist(s)	Singapore 1 (SIN)	625	605	626	694	599	604	3753
	Cherie Tan	211	227	243	236	189	217	1323
	New Hui Fen	210	170	182	221	175	221	1179
	Jazreel Tan	204	208	201	237	235	166	1251
3rd place, bronze medalist(s)	South Korea 2 (KOR)	603	593	562	665	648	621	3692
	Lee Yeong-seung	200	202	162	232	189	211	1196
	Jeon Eun-hee	155	228	189	200	225	204	1201
	Kim Jin-sun	248	163	211	233	234	206	1295
4	Indonesia 2 (INA)	649	552	660	620	595	608	3684
	Sharon Limansantoso	198	179	180	204	228	209	1198
	Tannya Roumimper	226	192	245	205	189	174	1231
	Putty Armein	225	181	235	211	178	225	1255
5	Chinese Taipei 1 (TPE)	631	653	606	532	651	590	3663
	Pan Yu-fen	246	215	233	187	226	203	1310
	Chang Yu-hsuan	183	224	162	160	212	209	1150
	Tsai Hsin-yi	202	214	211	185	213	178	1203
6	Malaysia 2 (MAS)	587	573	637	645	662	557	3661
	Jane Sin	185	221	242	243	279	210	1380
	Esther Cheah	212	174	148	188	182	146	1050
	Shalin Zulkifli	190	178	247	214	201	201	1231
7	Singapore 2 (SIN)	651	619	594	591	586	598	3639
	Daphne Tan	214	215	205	186	211	203	1234
	Joey Yeo	214	203	221	188	184	204	1214
	Shayna Ng	223	201	168	217	191	191	1191
8	China 2 (CHN)	661	560	571	575	605	653	3625
	Yang Suiling	223	191	189	181	178	228	1190
	Zhang Chunli	213	187	189	196	212	200	1197
	Zhang Yuhong	225	182	193	198	215	225	1238
9	Japan 1 (JPN)	609	598	665	513	555	597	3537
	Natsuki Teshima	199	201	194	169	210	174	1147
	Haruka Matsuda	216	205	245	171	159	188	1184
	Kanako Ishimine	194	192	226	173	186	235	1206
10	Japan 2 (JPN)	566	524	609	555	646	604	3504
	Mitsuki Okamoto	179	168	181	179	223	199	1129
	Hikaru Takekawa	180	190	233	164	227	178	1172
	Misaki Mukotani	207	166	195	212	196	227	1203
11	Philippines 1 (PHI)	568	581	582	593	589	571	3484
	Liza del Rosario	222	212	200	179	197	181	1191
	Liza Clutario	164	210	184	192	192	196	1138
	Lara Posadas	182	159	198	222	200	194	1155
12	Thailand 1 (THA)	553	599	605	615	557	538	3467
	Korngunya Aree	185	165	216	215	179	178	1138
	Arpakorn Netrviseth	177	195	205	217	163	179	1136
	Angkana Netrviseth	191	239	184	183	215	181	1193
13	Philippines 2 (PHI)	519	574	595	537	587	615	3427
	Alexis Sy	178	179	216	169	234	196	1172
	Anne Marie Kiac	173	173	157	180	163	180	1026
	Krizziah Tabora	168	222	222	188	190	239	1229
14	Chinese Taipei 2 (TPE)	583	550	578	545	576	558	3390
	Chien Hsiu-lan	202	165	211	169	201	206	1154
	Chou Chia-chen	189	191	177	172	193	184	1106
	Wang Ya-ting	192	194	190	204	182	168	1130
15	Hong Kong 1 (HKG)	634	570	566	527	531	545	3373
	Milki Ng	219	185	191	153	186	192	1126
	Zoe Tam	192	193	165	191	148	181	1070
	Chan Shuk Han	223	192	210	183	197	172	1177
16	Malaysia 1 (MAS)	558	543	585	600	520	562	3368
	Syaidatul Afifah	186	188	237	188	175	194	1168
	Siti Safiyah	209	184	167	189	188	169	1106
	Hee Kar Yen	163	171	181	223	157	199	1094
17	China 1 (CHN)	591	544	530	518	588	574	3345
	Sun Hongdou	222	162	196	149	213	224	1166
	Kong Min	188	201	170	180	206	169	1114
	Li Ling	181	181	164	189	169	181	1065
18	Macau 1 (MAC)	537	529	551	557	522	602	3298
	Filomena Choi	157	181	236	202	150	225	1151
	Julia Lam	196	178	152	182	178	203	1089
	Hui Tong	184	170	163	173	194	174	1058
19	Macau 2 (MAC)	494	533	565	533	453	508	3086
	Veronica de Souza	185	193	245	182	124	149	1078
	Au Man Wai	138	180	166	179	150	158	971
	Ku Sok Va	171	160	154	172	179	201	1037
20	Indonesia 1 (INA)	501	481	527	479	514	575	3077
	Novie Phang	139	136	164	146	189	227	1001
	Cheya Chantika	168	158	166	162	170	179	1003
	Alisha Nabila Larasati	194	187	197	171	155	169	1073
21	Mongolia 1 (MGL)	431	438	423	529	489	488	2798
	Khalzangiin Ölziikhorol	149	159	142	161	177	186	974
	Samdangiin Delgertsetseg	138	132	144	169	145	148	876
	Terveegiin Dorjderem	144	147	137	199	167	154	948
22	Kuwait 1 (KUW)	420	394	420	463	423	456	2576
	Altaf Karam	162	149	138	156	133	137	875
	Shaikha Al-Hendi	136	111	142	192	145	162	888
	Fatima Mohammad	122	134	140	115	145	157	813
23	Kuwait 2 (KUW)	225	258	246	265	271	258	1523
	Rawan Al-Omani	112	164	101	137	127	107	748
	Hessah Al-Juraied	113	94	145	128	144	151	775
	Aseel Mohammad	0	0	0	0	0	0	0
Individuals
	Joan Cheng (HKG)	144	176	187	159	155	159	980
	Luvsandagvyn Tsetsegsüren (MGL)	125	112	160	157	149	145	848
	Kritsanakorn Sangaroon (THA)	163	194	208	146	183	177	1071
	Tanaprang Sathean (THA)	175	222	172	213	191	185	1158
	Maleha Al-Azzani (YEM)	118	124	99	156	118	149	764
