= Singapore at the 2014 Asian Games =

- IOC code: SIN
- NOC: Singapore National Olympic Council
- Website: www.singaporeolympics.com (in English)

in Incheon
- Competitors: 227 in 20 sports
- Flag bearer: Gary Yeo
- Medals Ranked 15th: Gold 5 Silver 6 Bronze 14 Total 25

Asian Games appearances (overview)
- 1951; 1954; 1958; 1962; 1966; 1970; 1974; 1978; 1982; 1986; 1990; 1994; 1998; 2002; 2006; 2010; 2014; 2018; 2022; 2026

Singapore participated in the 2014 Asian Games in Incheon, South Korea from 19 September to 4 October 2014.

On 22 September, Tao Li won a silver medal for swimming in the women's 50m butterfly with a time of 26.28 seconds, missing out on a third consecutive Asian Games gold for the 50m butterfly.

Also on 22 September, the men's doubles team for Sepak Takraw were bronze medalists. The Laos team were disqualified for failure to play their semi-final match. Singapore had the best record of the teams that were eliminated from progression to the semi-finals, which was the fifth best record of all teams after the group stage. The team consisted of Mohamad Farhan Amran, Muhammad Hafiz Nor Izam Ja'afar and Eddy Nor Shafiq Sahari.

On 24 September, Schooling won Singapore's first gold medal at the 2014 Games, finishing first at the 100m butterfly final. He was the first male Singaporean swimmer to win a gold medal at the Asian Games, since Ang Peng Siong’s gold medal at the men's 100m freestyle at the 1982 Asiad in New Delhi.

== Media coverage ==
Singaporean public broadcasting conglomerate Mediacorp held the broadcast rights of the 2014 Asian Games in the country.

== Medalists ==
Medal	Name	Sport	Event	Date
Gold	Cherie Tan; Daphne Tan; Shayna Ng; New Hui Fen; Jazreel Tan; Joey Yeo	Bowling	Women's Team of 5	
Gold	Jodie Lai	Sailing	Women's Optimist	
Gold	Kimberley Lim; Savannah Siew	Sailing	Women's 420	
Gold	Maximilian Soh; Justin Wong; Andrew Paul Chan; Russell Kan; Christopher Lim	Sailing	Match racing	
Gold	Joseph Schooling	Swimming	Men's 100 m butterfly	
Silver	Jazreel Tan	Bowling	Women's Singles	
Silver	Cherie Tan; New Hui Fen; Jazreel Tan	Bowling	Women's Trios	
Silver	Raynn Kwok	Sailing	Men's Optimist	
Silver	Priscilla Low; Cecilia Low	Sailing	Women's 29er	
Silver	Joseph Schooling	Swimming	Men's 50 m butterfly	
Silver	Tao Li	Swimming	Women's 50 m butterfly	
Bronze	Jazreel Tan	Bowling	Women's All-events	
Bronze	Lim Wei Wen	Fencing	Men's individual épée	20 September
Bronze	Farhan Amran; Eddy Nor Shafiq Sahari; Hafiz Nor Izam Jaafar	Sepak takraw	Men's double regu	
Bronze	Colin Cheng	Sailing	Men's Laser	
Bronze	Loh Jia Yi; Jonathan Yeo	Sailing	Men's 420	
Bronze	Gai Bin	Shooting	Men's 25 m center fire pistol	
Bronze	Gai Bin; Lim Swee Hon; Poh Lip Meng	Shooting	25 m standard pistol team	
Bronze	Joseph Schooling	Swimming	Men's 200 m butterfly	21 September
Bronze	Danny Yeo; Pang Sheng Jun; Teo Zhen Ren; Clement Lim	Swimming	Men's 4 × 200 m freestyle relay	
Bronze	Tao Li	Swimming	Women's 100 m butterfly	
Bronze	Gao Ning; Li Hu	Table tennis	Men's doubles	
Bronze	Feng Tianwei	Table tennis	Women's singles	
Bronze	Feng Tianwei; Isabelle Li; Lin Ye; Yu Mengyu; Zhou Yihan	Table tennis	Women's team	
Bronze	Tan Yan Ni	Wushu	Women's changquan	
