= Bowling at the 2006 Asian Games =

- Venue: Qatar Bowling Center
- Dates: 3–10 December 2006
- Competitors: 191 from 20 nations

Bowling took place for the men's and women's individual, doubles, trios, and team events at the 2006 Asian Games in Doha, Qatar from December 3 to December 10. All events were held at the Qatar Bowling Center.

== Schedule ==
●	Round	●	Last round	P	Preliminary	F	Final

Event↓/Date →	3rd Sun	4th Mon	5th Tue	6th Wed	7th Thu	8th Fri	9th Sat	10th Sun	
Men's singles	●								
Men's doubles		●							
Men's trios			●	●					
Men's team of 5					●	●			
Men's all-events	●	●	●	●	●	●			
Men's masters							P	P	F
Women's singles	●								
Women's doubles		●							
Women's trios			●	●					
Women's team of 5					●	●			
Women's all-events	●	●	●	●	●	●			
Women's masters							P	P	F

== Medalists ==
=== Men ===
Event	Gold	Silver	Bronze
Singles	Ryan Leonard Lalisang; Indonesia	Choi Bok-eum; South Korea	Mahmood Al-Attar; United Arab Emirates
Doubles	Saudi Arabia; Hassan Al-Shaikh; Bader Al-Shaikh	Qatar; Abdulla Al-Qattan; Saeed Al-Hajri	Shared silver
Doubles	Saudi Arabia; Hassan Al-Shaikh; Bader Al-Shaikh	United Arab Emirates; Jamal Ali Mohammed; Nayef Eqab	Shared silver
Trios	Malaysia; Daniel Lim; Ben Heng; Aaron Kong	Singapore; Lee Yu Wen; Jason Yeong-Nathan; Remy Ong	Saudi Arabia; Bader Al-Shaikh; Faisal Al-Juraifani; Hassan Al-Shaikh
Team of 5	Japan; Toshihiko Takahashi; Masaaki Takemoto; Tomoyuki Sasaki; Tomokatsu Yamashita; Masaru Ito; Yoshinao Masatoki	South Korea; Choi Bok-eum; Joung Seoung-joo; Byun Ho-jin; Kang Hee-won; Jo Nam-yi; Park Sang-pil	Saudi Arabia; Hassan Al-Shaikh; Bader Al-Shaikh; Faisal Al-Juraifani; Ahmed Al-Hdyan; Yousif Akbar; Faisal Sugati
All-events	Bader Al-Shaikh; Saudi Arabia	Nayef Eqab; United Arab Emirates	Yannaphon Larpapharat; Thailand
Masters	Jo Nam-yi; South Korea	Remy Ong; Singapore	Choi Bok-eum; South Korea

=== Women ===
Event	Gold	Silver	Bronze
Singles	Esther Cheah; Malaysia	Putty Armein; Indonesia	Angkana Netrviseth; Thailand
Doubles	Singapore; Michelle Kwang; Valerie Teo	South Korea; Choi Jin-a; Kim Yeau-jin	Japan; Maki Nakano; Kanako Ishimine
Trios	South Korea; Kim Hyo-mi; Hwang Sun-ok; Nam Bo-ra	Malaysia; Esther Cheah; Zandra Aziela; Shalin Zulkifli	South Korea; Choi Jin-a; Gang Hye-eun; Kim Yeau-jin
Team of 5	Malaysia; Esther Cheah; Sharon Koh; Wendy Chai; Zandra Aziela; Shalin Zulkifli; Choy Poh Lai	South Korea; Choi Jin-a; Hwang Sun-ok; Gang Hye-eun; Kim Yeau-jin; Nam Bo-ra; Kim Hyo-mi	Singapore; Jennifer Tan; Cherie Tan; Evelyn Chan; Michelle Kwang; Valerie Teo; Sabrina Lim
All-events	Choi Jin-a; South Korea	Esther Cheah; Malaysia	Valerie Teo; Singapore
Masters	Choi Jin-a; South Korea	Esther Cheah; Malaysia	Kim Yeau-jin; South Korea

== Medal table ==
Rank	Nation	Gold	Silver	Bronze	Total
1	South Korea (KOR)	4	4	3	11
2	Malaysia (MAS)	3	3	0	6
3	Saudi Arabia (KSA)	2	0	2	4
4	Singapore (SIN)	1	2	2	5
5	Indonesia (INA)	1	1	0	2
6	Japan (JPN)	1	0	1	2
7	United Arab Emirates (UAE)	0	2	1	3
8	Qatar (QAT)	0	1	0	1
9	Thailand (THA)	0	0	2	2
Totals (9 entries)		12	13	11	36

== Participating nations ==
A total of 191 athletes from 20 nations competed in bowling at the 2006 Asian Games:

- Bahrain (12)
- Brunei (3)
- China (10)
- Chinese Taipei (12)
- Hong Kong (9)
- India (12)
- Indonesia (12)
- Japan (12)
- Kazakhstan (7)
- Kuwait (12)
- Macau (12)
- Malaysia (12)
- Philippines (12)
- Qatar (6)
- Saudi Arabia (6)
- Singapore (12)
- South Korea (12)
- Thailand (6)
- United Arab Emirates (6)
- Uzbekistan (6)
