= Bowling at the 2006 Asian Games – Women's all-events =

Bowling at the 2006 Asian Games - Women's all-events

Women's all-events at the 2006 Asian Games
- Venue: Qatar Bowling Center
- Date: 3–8 December 2006
- Competitors: 77 from 15 nations

Medalists
gold medal	Choi Jin-a	South Korea
silver medal	Esther Cheah	Malaysia
bronze medal	Valerie Teo	Singapore

The women's all-events competition at the 2006 Asian Games in Doha was held from 3 December to 8 December 2006 at Qatar Bowling Centre.

All-events scores are compiled by totaling series scores from the singles, doubles, trios and team events.

== Schedule ==
All times are Arabia Standard Time (UTC+03:00)

Date	Time	Event
Sunday, 3 December 2006	09:00	Singles
Monday, 4 December 2006	17:30	Doubles
Tuesday, 5 December 2006	17:30	Trios – First block
Wednesday, 6 December 2006	09:00	Trios – Second block
Thursday, 7 December 2006	13:30	Team – First block
Friday, 8 December 2006	09:00	Team – Second block

== Results ==
Rank	Athlete	Singles	Doubles	Trios	Team	Total
1st place, gold medalist(s)	Choi Jin-a (KOR)	1282	1356	1354	1347	5339
2nd place, silver medalist(s)	Esther Cheah (MAS)	1444	1253	1299	1300	5296
3rd place, bronze medalist(s)	Valerie Teo (SIN)	1275	1407	1272	1291	5245
4	Jennifer Tan (SIN)	1318	1380	1280	1209	5187
5	Shalin Zulkifli (MAS)	1190	1280	1371	1337	5178
6	Kanako Ishimine (JPN)	1328	1502	1239	1102	5171
7	Kim Yeau-jin (KOR)	1266	1264	1346	1272	5148
8	Hwang Sun-ok (KOR)	1205	1286	1440	1202	5133
9	Nam Bo-ra (KOR)	1316	1189	1307	1315	5127
10	Kim Hyo-mi (KOR)	1225	1250	1236	1404	5115
11	Zandra Aziela (MAS)	1291	1198	1303	1321	5113
12	Putty Armein (INA)	1395	1102	1309	1301	5107
13	Apple Posadas (PHI)	1214	1380	1209	1300	5103
14	Yang Suiling (CHN)	1312	1231	1312	1243	5098
15	Gang Hye-eun (KOR)	1284	1380	1240	1180	5084
16	Michelle Kwang (SIN)	1218	1264	1332	1257	5071
17	Liza del Rosario (PHI)	1138	1290	1292	1297	5017
18	Angkana Netrviseth (THA)	1331	1195	1282	1189	4997
19	Wendy Chai (MAS)	1184	1223	1219	1362	4988
20	Happy Ari Dewanti Soediyono (INA)	1267	1273	1231	1184	4955
21	Yuka Tsuchiya (JPN)	1192	1279	1255	1201	4927
22	Cherie Tan (SIN)	1209	1202	1217	1287	4915
23	Zhang Yuhong (CHN)	1226	1214	1246	1224	4910
24	Xu Lan (CHN)	1315	1133	1257	1151	4856
25	Tsai Hsin-yi (TPE)	1257	1191	1146	1249	4843
26	Chien Hsiu-lan (TPE)	1169	1206	1220	1225	4820
27	Zhang Chunli (CHN)	1255	1147	1210	1201	4813
28	Vanessa Fung (HKG)	1134	1193	1171	1312	4810
29	Tannya Roumimper (INA)	1281	1186	1145	1196	4808
30	Chou Miao-lin (TPE)	1190	1256	1232	1128	4806
31	Evelyn Chan (SIN)	1127	1315	1148	1195	4785
32	Nadia Al-Awadhi (BRN)	1139	1245	1280	1111	4775
33	Sharon Koh (MAS)	1275	1163	1098	1235	4771
33	Shen Yuye (CHN)	1146	1267	1103	1255	4771
35	Haruka Matsuda (JPN)	1166	1228	1103	1259	4756
36	Kumi Tsuzawa (JPN)	1173	1252	1148	1168	4741
37	Joey Yip (HKG)	1214	1162	1209	1141	4726
38	Novie Phang (INA)	1152	1218	1226	1121	4717
39	Josephine Canare (PHI)	1183	1237	1163	1132	4715
40	Choy Poh Lai (MAS)	1233	1186	1145	1147	4711
41	Sabrina Lim (SIN)	1161	1213	1168	1161	4703
42	Maki Nakano (JPN)	1271	1096	1199	1132	4698
43	Chu Yu-chieh (TPE)	1170	1175	1192	1151	4688
44	Liza Clutario (PHI)	1108	1188	1153	1190	4639
45	Cecilia Yap (PHI)	1227	1112	1094	1205	4638
46	Julia Lam (MAC)	1194	1153	1206	1077	4630
47	Renila Anisha Nugroho (INA)	1223	1129	1083	1149	4584
48	Filomena Choi (MAC)	1155	1126	1137	1150	4568
49	Pan Yu-fen (TPE)	1117	1087	1182	1180	4566
50	Irene Garcia (PHI)	1056	1162	1254	1091	4563
51	Ivana Hie (INA)	1289	1075	1103	1093	4560
52	Ayano Katai (JPN)	1157	1172	1157	1059	4545
53	Yasmin Al-Awadhi (BRN)	1128	1139	1031	1216	4514
54	Wang Yu-ling (TPE)	1053	1167	1086	1146	4452
55	Janet Lam (HKG)	1116	1199	1071	995	4381
56	Alexandra Foo (MAC)	1128	1093	1107	1048	4376
57	Saruta Songserm (THA)	1116	1076	1092	1052	4336
58	Nora Al-Roudan (KUW)	997	1132	1036	1095	4260
59	Sabeena Saleem (IND)	1136	1018	1000	1105	4259
60	Sumathi Nallabantu (IND)	1019	1112	1045	1058	4234
61	Yuen Nga Lai (MAC)	1163	1020	981	1059	4223
62	Veronika Solozhenkina (KAZ)	1080	1019	1015	1073	4187
63	Choi Pui Hing (MAC)	1046	1011	1065	1061	4183
64	Fatima Al-Qaseer (BRN)	1047	1019	1071	988	4125
65	Chan Weng Sam (MAC)	983	970	981	1106	4040
66	Mariam Habib (BRN)	1022	983	1022	1004	4031
67	Pratima Hegde (IND)	1010	968	1053	953	3984
68	Hanadi Al-Mezaiel (KUW)	1013	1015	928	937	3893
69	Judy Alban (IND)	977	986	916	996	3875
70	Sana Saleem (IND)	906	1014	954	965	3839
71	Sheela Kumari (IND)	956	958	914	992	3820
72	Bashaer Rashed (KUW)	888	771	997	925	3581
73	Fatima Mohammad (KUW)	890	920	841	903	3554
74	Noora Majed Sultan (BRN)	1071	965	960	478	3474
75	Shaikha Al-Hendi (KUW)	836	763	843	825	3267
76	Yasmin Al-Raees (BRN)	991	851	828	441	3111
77	Farah Al-Mulla (KUW)	934	817	611	0	2362
