= Bowling at the 2006 Asian Games – Women's doubles =

2006 Asian Games Doha

Women's doubles at the 2006 Asian Games
- Venue: Qatar Bowling Center
- Date: 4 December 2006
- Competitors: 74 from 14 nations

Medalists
gold medal	Michelle Kwang; Valerie Teo	Singapore
silver medal	Choi Jin-a; Kim Yeau-jin	South Korea
bronze medal	Maki Nakano; Kanako Ishimine	Japan

The women's doubles competition at the 2006 Asian Games in Doha was held on 4 December 2006 at Qatar Bowling Centre.

== Schedule ==
All times are Arabia Standard Time (UTC+03:00)

Date	Time	Event
Monday, 4 December 2006	17:30	Squad A
Monday, 4 December 2006	21:30	Squad B

== Results ==
Rank	Team	Game						Total
Rank	Team	1	2	3	4	5	6	Total
1st place, gold medalist(s)	Singapore 1 (SIN)	452	444	485	437	388	465	2671
	Michelle Kwang	217	202	206	213	201	225	1264
	Valerie Teo	235	242	279	224	187	240	1407
2nd place, silver medalist(s)	South Korea 1 (KOR)	448	416	435	398	463	460	2620
	Choi Jin-a	225	203	200	215	257	256	1356
	Kim Yeau-jin	223	213	235	183	206	204	1264
3rd place, bronze medalist(s)	Japan 1 (JPN)	470	475	472	390	364	427	2598
	Maki Nakano	234	186	236	132	149	159	1096
	Kanako Ishimine	236	289	236	258	215	268	1502
4	Singapore 2 (SIN)	437	482	443	381	401	438	2582
	Jennifer Tan	214	269	230	216	207	244	1380
	Cherie Tan	223	213	213	165	194	194	1202
5	South Korea 3 (KOR)	527	374	379	432	387	470	2569
	Gang Hye-eun	300	191	203	218	202	266	1380
	Nam Bo-ra	227	183	176	214	185	204	1189
6	Philippines 3 (PHI)	461	447	493	369	397	401	2568
	Apple Posadas	269	245	266	182	214	204	1380
	Liza Clutario	192	202	227	187	183	197	1188
7	South Korea 2 (KOR)	401	386	363	438	466	482	2536
	Hwang Sun-ok	211	184	190	235	228	238	1286
	Kim Hyo-mi	190	202	173	203	238	244	1250
8	Malaysia 3 (MAS)	417	429	417	414	389	467	2533
	Esther Cheah	192	203	228	193	194	243	1253
	Shalin Zulkifli	225	226	189	221	195	224	1280
9	Singapore 3 (SIN)	420	482	403	341	444	438	2528
	Sabrina Lim	194	278	220	160	180	181	1213
	Evelyn Chan	226	204	183	181	264	257	1315
10	Philippines 1 (PHI)	418	440	383	409	442	435	2527
	Liza del Rosario	192	195	203	207	257	236	1290
	Josephine Canare	226	245	180	202	185	199	1237
11	Japan 3 (JPN)	378	409	426	420	455	392	2480
	Haruka Matsuda	180	206	225	184	229	204	1228
	Kumi Tsuzawa	198	203	201	236	226	188	1252
12	Japan 2 (JPN)	417	356	417	421	390	450	2451
	Ayano Katai	186	149	215	215	178	229	1172
	Yuka Tsuchiya	231	207	202	206	212	221	1279
13	Chinese Taipei 1 (TPE)	400	375	467	406	417	382	2447
	Tsai Hsin-yi	190	188	213	180	236	184	1191
	Chou Miao-lin	210	187	254	226	181	198	1256
14	Malaysia 2 (MAS)	408	418	389	385	373	436	2409
	Wendy Chai	191	221	203	192	201	215	1223
	Choy Poh Lai	217	197	186	193	172	221	1186
15	Indonesia 2 (INA)	415	403	404	411	371	400	2404
	Tannya Roumimper	196	190	207	190	200	203	1186
	Novie Phang	219	213	197	221	171	197	1218
16	Bahrain 2 (BRN)	315	390	448	357	428	446	2384
	Yasmin Al-Awadhi	157	185	246	181	192	178	1139
	Nadia Al-Awadhi	158	205	202	176	236	268	1245
17	Indonesia 1 (INA)	387	397	357	461	356	417	2375
	Happy Ari Dewanti Soediyono	214	185	160	268	211	235	1273
	Putty Armein	173	212	197	193	145	182	1102
18	Chinese Taipei 3 (TPE)	394	425	396	403	373	382	2373
	Chien Hsiu-lan	185	248	192	201	190	190	1206
	Wang Yu-ling	209	177	204	202	183	192	1167
19	China 2 (CHN)	393	382	386	396	379	428	2364
	Xu Lan	203	192	152	181	170	235	1133
	Yang Suiling	190	190	234	215	209	193	1231
20	China 1 (CHN)	452	373	397	366	405	368	2361
	Zhang Chunli	204	169	183	180	212	199	1147
	Zhang Yuhong	248	204	214	186	193	169	1214
20	Malaysia 1 (MAS)	428	392	390	378	396	377	2361
	Sharon Koh	223	196	167	195	185	197	1163
	Zandra Aziela	205	196	223	183	211	180	1198
22	Hong Kong 1 (HKG)	376	439	323	456	331	430	2355
	Vanessa Fung	200	213	178	199	168	235	1193
	Joey Yip	176	226	145	257	163	195	1162
23	Macau 1 (MAC)	361	423	359	373	367	396	2279
	Julia Lam	191	212	186	182	178	204	1153
	Filomena Choi	170	211	173	191	189	192	1126
24	Philippines 2 (PHI)	335	377	337	428	349	448	2274
	Irene Garcia	198	212	148	238	175	191	1162
	Cecilia Yap	137	165	189	190	174	257	1112
25	Thailand 1 (THA)	333	286	383	414	458	397	2271
	Saruta Songserm	164	117	178	203	202	212	1076
	Angkana Netrviseth	169	169	205	211	256	185	1195
26	Chinese Taipei 2 (TPE)	361	314	400	399	417	371	2262
	Pan Yu-fen	160	154	185	185	220	183	1087
	Chu Yu-chieh	201	160	215	214	197	188	1175
27	Indonesia 3 (INA)	326	306	423	362	428	359	2204
	Renila Anisha Nugroho	181	168	227	183	201	169	1129
	Ivana Hie	145	138	196	179	227	190	1075
28	Kuwait 1 (KUW)	406	330	383	334	370	324	2147
	Nora Al-Roudan	221	171	225	145	219	151	1132
	Hanadi Al-Mezaiel	185	159	158	189	151	173	1015
29	Macau 2 (MAC)	344	382	359	357	336	335	2113
	Alexandra Foo	189	212	203	166	166	157	1093
	Yuen Nga Lai	155	170	156	191	170	178	1020
30	India 2 (IND)	339	335	352	366	361	317	2070
	Sheela Kumari	154	163	194	166	149	132	958
	Sumathi Nallabantu	185	172	158	200	212	185	1112
31	India 3 (IND)	285	354	347	318	359	337	2000
	Judy Alban	145	171	168	169	190	143	986
	Sana Saleem	140	183	179	149	169	194	1014
32	India 1 (IND)	397	343	349	306	294	297	1986
	Pratima Hegde	191	183	158	163	137	136	968
	Sabeena Saleem	206	160	191	143	157	161	1018
33	Bahrain 1 (BRN)	323	312	310	282	355	402	1984
	Fatima Al-Qaseer	166	153	137	151	200	212	1019
	Noora Majed Sultan	157	159	173	131	155	190	965
34	Macau 3 (MAC)	286	304	325	321	378	367	1981
	Chan Weng Sam	139	151	163	159	180	178	970
	Choi Pui Hing	147	153	162	162	198	189	1011
35	Bahrain 3 (BRN)	279	299	297	333	295	331	1834
	Yasmin Al-Raees	143	128	123	157	136	164	851
	Mariam Habib	136	171	174	176	159	167	983
36	Kuwait 2 (KUW)	299	270	329	304	257	278	1737
	Fatima Mohammad	157	134	180	141	158	150	920
	Farah Al-Mulla	142	136	149	163	99	128	817
37	Kuwait 3 (KUW)	322	265	227	213	249	258	1534
	Bashaer Rashed	163	140	117	122	107	122	771
	Shaikha Al-Hendi	159	125	110	91	142	136	763
Individuals
	Shen Yuye (CHN)	188	150	240	248	229	212	1267
	Janet Lam (HKG)	199	190	206	178	203	223	1199
	Veronika Solozhenkina (KAZ)	159	193	176	146	149	196	1019
