= Anugerah Sukan Negara for Sportswoman of the Year =

List of winners and nominees of the Anugerah Sukan Negara: Sportswoman of the Year.

== List of winners and nominees ==
Year	Athlete	Sport	Refs
1966	Mary Rajamani	Athletics	
1966	Teoh Siew Yong	Badminton	
1966	Annie Goh Koon Gee	Basketball	
1966	Kelene Theseira	Fencing	
1966	Daphne Boudville	Field hockey	
1966	Lim Geok Wah	Swimming	
1966	Tan Sok Hong	Table tennis	
1966	Ho Yeok Keow	Volleyball	
1967	Mary Rajamani	Athletics	
1967	Rosalind Singha Ang	Badminton	
1967	Ho Chung Ying	Basketball	
1967	Kelene Theseira	Fencing	
1967	Ruby Kunaratnam	Field hockey	
1967	Radhika Menon	Tennis	
1967	Audrey Gan	Swimming	
1967	Tan Sok Hong	Table tennis	
1967	Shue Pei Tuan	Volleyball	
1968	Annie Goh Koon Gee	Basketball	
1968	Mary Rajamani	Athletics	
1968	Ong Mei Lin	Swimming	
1968	Rosalind Singha Ang	Badminton	
1968	Radhika Menon	Tennis	
1968	Ho Moy Chai	Volleyball	
1969	Ong Mei Lin	Swimming	
1969	P. Savithri	Athletics	
1969	Rosalind Singha Ang	Badminton	
1969	Soo Ah Noi	Basketball	
1969	Kelene Theseira	Fencing	
1969	Radhika Menon	Tennis	
1969	Chong Sook Fong	Table tennis	
1969	Hon So Hooi	Volleyball	
1970	Radhika Menon	Tennis	
1970	Gladys Chai Ng Mei	Athletics	
1970	Sylvia Ng Meow Eng	Badminton	
1970	Annie Goh Koon Gee	Basketball	
1970	Kessy Theseira	Fencing	
1970	Rani Kaur	Field hockey	
1970	Yap Pow Thong	Shooting	
1970	Ong Mei Lin	Swimming	
1970	Tan Sok Hong	Table tennis	
1970	Hon So Hoo	Volleyball	
1971	Junaidah Aman	Athletics	
1972	Junaidah Aman	Athletics	
1973	Gladys Chai Ng Mei	Athletics	
1973	Rosanna Lam Ai Leng	Swimming	
1973	Sylvia Ng Meow Eng	Badminton	
1973	Kelene Theseira	Fencing	
1973	Wong Boon Heng	Field hockey	
1973	Lim Khee Suan	Tennis	
1973	Tan Sok Hong	Table tennis	
1973	Chai Geek Hua	Volleyball	
1973	Soo Ah Noi	Basketball	
1974	Rani Kaur	Field hockey	
1974	Junaidah Aman	Athletics	
1974	Sylvia Ng Meow Eng	Badminton	
1975	Sylvia Ng Meow Eng	Badminton	
1975	Gladys Chai Ng Mei	Athletics	
1975	Tan Sok Hong	Table tennis	
1975	Sam Amoy	Basketball	
1975	Vivian Tham	Swimming	
1975	Jessie Lee	Bowling	
1975	Cheah Leong Chiew	Tennis	
1975	Hon Soo Hooi	Volleyball	
1976	Marina Chin Leng Sim	Athletics	
1976	Daphne Boudville	Field hockey	
1976	Sylvia Ng Meow Eng	Badminton	
1977	Marina Chin Leng Sim	Athletics	
1978	Sylvia Ng Meow Eng	Badminton	
1979	Shirley Chow Chew Chun	Bowling	
1979	Marina Chin Leng Sim	Athletics	
1979	Katherine Teh	Badminton	
1979	Lee Siok Kian	Basketball	
1979	Fadzillah Mohamed Noor	Football	
1979	Mary Soo	Field hockey	
1979	Liew Mei Ling	Judo	
1979	Carmen Edmonds	Netball	
1979	Cheah Mok Lan	Softball	
1979	Sandra Liew	Squash	
1979	Christina Lam	Swimming	
1979	Tan Sok Hong and Chong Sulk Fong	Table tennis	
1979	Cheah Sing Yong	Taekwondo	
1979	Toh Seok Har	Tennis	
1979	Hii Bai Seng	Volleyball	
1980	Katerina Ong Su Mei	Swimming	
1981	Helen Chow	Swimming	
1981	Mumtaz Begum Jaafar	Athletics	
1982	Zaiton Othman	Athletics	
1982	Ng Swee Fong	Basketball	
1982	Shirley Chow Chew Chun	Bowling	
1982	Nancy Lim	Fencing	
1982	Saadiah Idrus	Football	
1982	Mary Lim	Field hockey	
1982	Tean Peak Lim	Netball	
1982	Yau Siew Fun	Softball	
1982	Anna Kronenburg	Squash	
1982	Helen Chow	Swimming	
1982	Goh Shwu Pang	Table tennis	
1982	Tan Bee Keng	Taekwondo	
1982	Kam Su Shin	Tennis	
1982	Hii Bai Seng	Volleyball	
1983	Norsham Yoon	Athletics	
1984	none awarded	none awarded	
1984	Jessie Lee	Bowling	
1984	May Tan	Swimming	
1985	Nurul Huda Abdullah	Swimming	
1985	Pearly Chong	Bowling	
1986	Nurul Huda Abdullah	Swimming	
1987	Nurul Huda Abdullah	Swimming	
1988	Nurul Huda Abdullah	Swimming	
1988	Lisa Kwan	Bowling	
1988	Chong Fui Mei	Karate	
1989	Nurul Huda Abdullah	Swimming	
1990	Lydia Kwah Poh Ling	Bowling	
1991	Lisa Kwan	Bowling	
1991	Lim Geok Fong	Archery	
1991	Shanti Govindasamy	Athletics	
1991	Chew Kun Nee	Basketball	
1991	Kartina Natra Mohamed	Field hockey	
1991	Irene Yeoh	Golf	
1991	Michelle Koh	Karate	
1991	Rogayah Ahmad	Netball	
1991	Phun Bee Sim	Table tennis	
1991	Sarah Chung	Taekwondo	
1991	Elaine Chew	Tennis	
1992	Lim Ai Lian	Golf	
1993	Lisa Kwan	Bowling	
1993	Siti Aishah Sudin	Archery	
1993	P. Jayanthi	Athletics	
1993	Lee Wai Leng	Badminton	
1993	Koh Orchid	Basketball	
1993	Eliza Hanum Ibrahim	Chess	
1993	Annie Foo May Lan	Fencing	
1993	Farrah Hani Imran	Rhythmic gymnastics	
1993	Kartina Natra Mohamed	Field hockey	
1993	Yeoh Oon Oon	Judo	
1993	Adelyn Prudente	Karate	
1993	Beatrice Yaw	Football	
1993	Fatimah Salleh	Netball	
1993	Noriha Rani	Shooting	
1993	Phua Bee Sim	Table tennis	
1993	Sarah Chung	Taekwondo	
1993	Khoo Chin Bee	Tennis	
1993	Diong Mee Lee	Volleyball	
1994	Shalin Zulkifli	Bowling	
1995	Sharon Low Su Lin	Bowling	
1995	Anastasia Karen Raj	Athletics	
1995	Sarah Chung	Taekwondo	
1996	Shalin Zulkifli	Bowling	
1996	Anastasia Karen Raj	Athletics	
1996	Thye Chee Kiat	Rhythmic gymnastics	
1996	Leong Siu Lynn	Squash	
1997	Shalin Zulkifli	Bowling	
1997	Shanti Govindasamy	Athletics	
1997	Au Li Yen	Artistic gymnastics	
1997	Nurul Hudda Baharin	Shooting	
1998	Shanti Govindasamy	Athletics	
1998	Nurul Hudda Baharin	Shooting	
1998	Nicol David	Squash	
1999	Nicol David	Squash	
1999	Tang Mee Huong	Netball	
1999	Choo Seck Yun	Basketball	
1999	Ong Siew Meei	Volleyball	
1999	Au Li Yen	Artistic gymnastics	
1999	Lim Lee Lee	Karate	
1999	Nor Hashimah Ismail	Lawn bowls	
1999	Roslina Bakar	Shooting	
1999	Yuan Yufang	Athletics	
1999	Lee Wan Yuen	Taekwondo	
2000	Noraseela Mohd Khalid	Athletics	
2000	Nicol David	Squash	
2000	Shalin Zulkifli	Bowling	
2000	Wong Mei Yee	Netball	
2000	Low Bee Chuan	Basketball	
2000	Ong Siew Meei	Volleyball	
2000	M. Sri Rajarajeswari	Karate	
2000	Roslina Bakar	Shooting	
2000	Beh Lee Fong	Table tennis	
2000	Sia Wai Yen	Swimming	
2000	Azlinda Ahmad	Pencak silat	
2000	Lee Wan Yuen	Taekwondo	
2001	Shalin Zulkifli	Bowling	
2001	Nicol David	Squash	
2002	Shalin Zulkifli	Bowling	
2002	S. Premila	Karate	
2002	Siti Zalina Ahmad	Lawn bowls	
2002	Bibiana Ng Pei Chin	Shooting	
2002	Yuan Yufang	Athletics	
2002	Lee Wan Yuen	Taekwondo	
2003	Nicol David	Squash	
2003	Wong Mew Choo	Badminton	
2003	Shalin Zulkifli	Bowling	
2003	Durratun Nasihin Rosli	Rhythmic gymnastics	
2003	Yuan Yufang	Athletics	
2003	Siow Yi Ting	Swimming	
2004	Elaine Teo	Karate	
2004	Nicol David	Squash	
2004	Yuan Yufang	Athletics	
2004	Leong Mun Yee	Diving	
2004	Mastura Sapuan	Pencak silat	
2004	Noor Azian Alias	Cycling	
2004	Putri Aliya Soraya Ahmad Shuhaimi	Equestrian	
2005	Nicol David	Squash	
2005	Roslinda Samsu	Athletics	
2005	Chin Eei Hui and Wong Pei Tty	Badminton	
2005	Chow Siao Foong	Basketball	
2005	Wendy Chai De Choo	Bowling	
2005	Noor Azian Alias	Cycling	
2005	Leong Mun Yee	Diving	
2005	Foong Seow Ting	Rhythmic gymnastics	
2005	A. Vasantha Marial	Karate	
2005	Nor Iryani Azmi	Lawn bowls	
2005	Luk Teck Eng	Volleyball	
2005	Chai Fong Ying	Wushu	
2006	Nicol David	Squash	
2006	Roslinda Samsu	Athletics	
2006	Esther Cheah Mei Lan	Bowling	
2006	Siti Zalina Ahmad	Lawn bowls	
2006	Chai Fong Ying	Wushu	
2007	Nicol David	Squash	
2007	Shalin Zulkifli	Bowling	
2007	Wong Mew Choo	Badminton	
2007	Roslinda Samsu	Athletics	
2007	Yamini Gopalasamy	Karate	
2007	Chow Siao Foong	Basketball	
2007	Quzandria Nur Mahamad Fathil	Equestrian	
2007	Lim Wen Chen	Rhythmic gymnastics	
2007	Siti Zalina Ahmad	Lawn bowls	
2007	Ng Sock Khim	Table tennis	
2007	Khoo Cai Lin	Swimming	
2007	Che Chew Chan	Taekwondo	
2007	Chai Fong Ying	Wushu	
2008	Nicol David	Squash	
2008	Wong Pei Tty and Chin Eei Hui	Badminton	
2008	Chai Fong Ying	Wushu	
2008	Fatehah Mustapa	Cycling	
2008	Wendy Chai De Choo	Bowling	
2008	Siti Zalina Ahmad	Lawn bowls	
2008	Siow Yi Ting	Swimming	
2009	Nicol David	Squash	
2009	Wong Pei Tty and Chin Eei Hui	Badminton	
2009	Siti Safiyah Amirah Abdul Rahman	Bowling	
2009	Siow Yi Ting	Swimming	
2009	Noraseela Mohd Khalid	Athletics	
2009	Jamaliah Jamaluddin	Karate	
2010	Nicol David	Squash	
2010	Pandelela Rinong	Diving	
2010	Elaine Koon	Rhythmic gymnastics	
2010	Nur Suryani Mohd Taibi	Shooting	
2010	Chai Fong Ying	Wushu	
2010	Lim Lee Lee	Karate	
2011	Pandelela Rinong	Diving	
2011	Nicol David	Squash	
2011	Nur Suryani Mohd Taibi	Shooting	
2011	Fatehah Mustapa	Cycling	
2011	Chai Fong Ying	Wushu	
2011	Jacqueline Jenelee Sijore	Bowling	
2012	Pandelela Rinong	Diving	
2012	Nicol David	Squash	
2012	Nur Suryani Mohd Taibi	Shooting	
2012	Esther Cheah Mei Lan	Bowling	
2012	Chai Fong Ying	Wushu	
2012	Quzandria Nur Muhamad Fathil	Equestrian	
2012	Fatehah Mustapa	Cycling	
2013	Nicol David	Squash	
2013	Pandelela Rinong	Diving	
2013	Diana Bong Siong Lin	Wushu	
2013	Kelly Tan	Golf	
2013	Casier Renee Kelly Lee	Athletics	
2013	Nisha Alagasan	Karate	
2014	Nicol David	Squash	
2014	Cheong Jun Hoong	Diving	
2014	Nur Suryani Mohd Taibi	Shooting	
2014	Sin Li Jane	Bowling	
2014	Siti Rahmah Mohamed Nasir	Pencak silat	
2014	Siti Zalina Ahmad	Lawn bowls	
2014	Syakilla Salni Jefri Krisnan	Karate	
2014	Tan Li Lian	Bodybuilding	
2015	Pandelela Rinong	Diving	
2015	Nur Izzati Yaakob	Basketball	
2015	Fatin Nurfatehah Mat Salleh	Archery	
2015	Siti Rahmah Mohamed Nasir	Pencak silat	
2015	Nur Syazrin Muhamad Latif	Sailing	
2015	Chan Lu Yi	Wushu	
2016	Siti Rahmah Mohamed Nasir	Pencak silat	
2016	Pandelela Rinong	Diving	
2016	Siti Zalina Ahmad	Lawn bowls	
2016	Sin Li Jane	Bowling	
2016	Tan Li Lian	Bodybuilding	
2016	Aaliyah Yoong Hanifah	Waterskiing	
2017	Cheong Jun Hoong	Diving	
2017	S Sivasangari	Squash	
2017	Koi Sie Yan	Rhythmic gymnastics	
2017	Fatehah Mustapa	Cycling	
2017	Emma Firyana Saroji	Lawn bowls	
2017	Siti Safiyah Amirah Abdul Rahman	Bowling	
2018	Amy Kwan	Rhythmic gymnastics	
2018	S Sivasangari	Squash	
2018	Siti Zalina Ahmad	Lawn bowls	
2018	Siti Safiyah Amirah Abdul Rahman	Bowling	
2018	Tan Li Lian	Bodybuilding	
2019/ 2020	Tan Cheong Min	Wushu	
2019/ 2020	Pandelela Rinong	Diving	
2019/ 2020	Siti Zalina Ahmad	Lawn bowls	
2019/ 2020	Sin Li Jane	Bowling	
2019/ 2020	Farah Ann Abdul Hadi	Artistic gymnastics	
2021	Pandelela Rinong	Diving	
2021	Rachel Arnold	Squash	
2021	Aifa Azman	Squash	
2021	Meilaura Dora Jimmy	Bodybuilding	
2021	Nur Amisha Azrilrizal	Muay Thai	
2022	Ng Joe Ee	Rhythmic gymnastics	
2022	Pandelela Rinong	Diving	
2022	Nur Dhabitah Sabri	Diving	
2022	Nur Amisha Azrilrizal	Muay Thai	
2022	Nur Ain Syuhada Mohd Asri	Pétanque	
2023	Natasha Mohamed Roslan	Bowling	
2023	Sivasangari Subramaniam	Squash	
2023	Nur Amisha Azrilrizal	Muay Thai	
2023	Nur Syazrin Mohamad Latif	Sailing	
2023	Alyani Jamil	Lawn bowls	
2024	Nor Farah Ain Abdullah	Lawn bowls	
2024	Sin Li Jane	Bowling	
2024	Tan Cheong Min	Wushu	
2024	Nurul Izzah Izzati Mohd Asri	Cycling	
2024	Nor Farah Mazlan	Pencak silat	

== See also ==
- Anugerah Sukan Negara for Sportsman of the Year
- Athlete of the Year
