= Bowling at the 2006 Asian Games – Women's singles =

Women's singles at the 2006 Asian Games
- Venue: Qatar Bowling Center
- Date: 3 December 2006
- Competitors: 77 from 15 nations

Medalists
gold medal	Esther Cheah	Malaysia
silver medal	Putty Armein	Indonesia
bronze medal	Angkana Netrviseth	Thailand

The women's singles competition at the 2006 Asian Games in Doha was held on 3 December 2006 at Qatar Bowling Center.

== Schedule ==
All times are Arabia Standard Time (UTC+03:00)

Date	Time	Event
Sunday, 3 December 2006	09:00	Squad A
Sunday, 3 December 2006	13:00	Squad B

== Results ==
Rank	Athlete	Game						Total
Rank	Athlete	1	2	3	4	5	6	Total
1st place, gold medalist(s)	Esther Cheah (MAS)	243	243	213	258	233	254	1444
2nd place, silver medalist(s)	Putty Armein (INA)	235	258	214	178	276	234	1395
3rd place, bronze medalist(s)	Angkana Netrviseth (THA)	192	210	257	228	207	237	1331
4	Kanako Ishimine (JPN)	256	199	186	204	235	248	1328
5	Jennifer Tan (SIN)	192	234	238	224	206	224	1318
6	Nam Bo-ra (KOR)	187	222	207	235	258	207	1316
7	Xu Lan (CHN)	184	247	243	203	224	214	1315
8	Yang Suiling (CHN)	203	249	196	254	216	194	1312
9	Zandra Aziela (MAS)	174	201	209	228	242	237	1291
10	Ivana Hie (INA)	158	245	202	211	236	237	1289
11	Gang Hye-eun (KOR)	255	180	210	230	219	190	1284
12	Choi Jin-a (KOR)	203	225	214	225	204	211	1282
13	Tannya Roumimper (INA)	190	211	258	203	207	212	1281
14	Valerie Teo (SIN)	234	179	226	216	195	225	1275
14	Sharon Koh (MAS)	187	214	222	190	258	204	1275
16	Maki Nakano (JPN)	224	219	207	215	214	192	1271
17	Happy Ari Dewanti Soediyono (INA)	214	170	172	221	286	204	1267
18	Kim Yeau-jin (KOR)	167	212	210	191	207	279	1266
19	Tsai Hsin-yi (TPE)	202	205	223	197	192	238	1257
20	Zhang Chunli (CHN)	200	204	199	257	209	186	1255
21	Choy Poh Lai (MAS)	185	201	219	187	199	242	1233
22	Cecilia Yap (PHI)	195	223	190	180	239	200	1227
23	Zhang Yuhong (CHN)	209	202	182	202	196	235	1226
24	Kim Hyo-mi (KOR)	206	222	220	178	176	223	1225
25	Renila Anisha Nugroho (INA)	231	197	222	198	181	194	1223
26	Michelle Kwang (SIN)	184	219	174	182	210	249	1218
27	Apple Posadas (PHI)	202	161	225	179	222	225	1214
27	Joey Yip (HKG)	202	234	222	233	171	152	1214
29	Cherie Tan (SIN)	195	186	210	222	171	225	1209
30	Hwang Sun-ok (KOR)	206	173	180	218	211	217	1205
31	Julia Lam (MAC)	189	193	245	186	185	196	1194
32	Yuka Tsuchiya (JPN)	174	179	214	182	198	245	1192
33	Shalin Zulkifli (MAS)	221	207	190	181	178	213	1190
33	Chou Miao-lin (TPE)	211	192	223	206	188	170	1190
35	Wendy Chai (MAS)	173	182	190	213	248	178	1184
36	Josephine Canare (PHI)	162	220	234	175	200	192	1183
37	Kumi Tsuzawa (JPN)	194	190	195	211	206	177	1173
38	Chu Yu-chieh (TPE)	204	209	203	179	183	192	1170
39	Chien Hsiu-lan (TPE)	182	181	225	178	188	215	1169
40	Haruka Matsuda (JPN)	179	210	195	202	145	235	1166
41	Yuen Nga Lai (MAC)	181	198	185	212	193	194	1163
42	Sabrina Lim (SIN)	211	183	195	215	183	174	1161
43	Ayano Katai (JPN)	178	181	204	181	212	201	1157
44	Filomena Choi (MAC)	170	226	191	213	185	170	1155
45	Novie Phang (INA)	171	194	224	181	195	187	1152
46	Shen Yuye (CHN)	167	182	171	211	205	210	1146
47	Nadia Al-Awadhi (BRN)	162	166	225	194	225	167	1139
48	Liza del Rosario (PHI)	208	171	196	206	201	156	1138
49	Sabeena Saleem (IND)	190	202	177	211	192	164	1136
50	Vanessa Fung (HKG)	213	208	165	201	170	177	1134
51	Alexandra Foo (MAC)	182	174	199	170	193	210	1128
51	Yasmin Al-Awadhi (BRN)	198	202	172	182	173	201	1128
53	Evelyn Chan (SIN)	156	246	175	188	180	182	1127
54	Pan Yu-fen (TPE)	170	161	203	201	165	217	1117
55	Saruta Songserm (THA)	152	215	165	198	207	179	1116
55	Janet Lam (HKG)	193	171	159	191	216	186	1116
57	Liza Clutario (PHI)	171	183	151	209	199	195	1108
58	Veronika Solozhenkina (KAZ)	209	171	172	171	212	145	1080
59	Noora Majed Sultan (BRN)	191	195	182	171	171	161	1071
60	Irene Garcia (PHI)	166	177	181	189	182	161	1056
61	Wang Yu-ling (TPE)	161	193	169	155	185	190	1053
62	Fatima Al-Qaseer (BRN)	208	144	189	151	167	188	1047
63	Choi Pui Hing (MAC)	137	144	182	159	227	197	1046
64	Mariam Habib (BRN)	167	153	156	209	167	170	1022
65	Sumathi Nallabantu (IND)	168	178	152	182	159	180	1019
66	Hanadi Al-Mezaiel (KUW)	142	186	145	203	191	146	1013
67	Pratima Hegde (IND)	153	127	176	178	191	185	1010
68	Nora Al-Roudan (KUW)	197	136	156	195	167	146	997
69	Yasmin Al-Raees (BRN)	148	181	185	131	194	152	991
70	Chan Weng Sam (MAC)	164	168	163	160	188	140	983
71	Judy Alban (IND)	156	174	176	157	177	137	977
72	Sheela Kumari (IND)	157	147	177	161	187	127	956
73	Farah Al-Mulla (KUW)	149	168	175	121	165	156	934
74	Sana Saleem (IND)	166	124	157	148	137	174	906
75	Fatima Mohammad (KUW)	135	147	158	127	152	171	890
76	Bashaer Rashed (KUW)	149	119	155	149	146	170	888
77	Shaikha Al-Hendi (KUW)	140	119	115	162	173	127	836
