= Bowling at the 2006 Asian Games – Women's team =

Bowling event in Doha, Qatar

Women's team of 5 at the 2006 Asian Games
- Venue: Qatar Bowling Center
- Date: 7–8 December 2006
- Competitors: 71 from 12 nations

Medalists
gold medal	Malaysia; Esther Cheah, Sharon Koh, Wendy Chai, Zandra Aziela, Shalin Zulkifli, Choy Poh Lai
silver medal	South Korea; Choi Jin-a, Hwang Sun-ok, Gang Hye-eun, Kim Yeau-jin, Nam Bo-ra, Kim Hyo-mi
bronze medal	Singapore; Jennifer Tan, Cherie Tan, Evelyn Chan, Michelle Kwang, Valerie Teo, Sabrina Lim

The women's team of five competition at the 2006 Asian Games in Doha was held on 7 and 8 December 2006 at Qatar Bowling Centre.

== Schedule ==
All times are Arabia Standard Time (UTC+03:00)

Date	Time	Event
Thursday, 7 December 2006	13:30	First Block
Friday, 8 December 2006	09:00	Second block

== Results ==
Rank	Team	Game						Total
Rank	Team	1	2	3	4	5	6	Total
1st place, gold medalist(s)	Malaysia (MAS)	984	1105	1040	1140	1063	1223	6555
	Esther Cheah	232	213	189	216	215	235	1300
	Sharon Koh	166	217	183	230	213	226	1235
	Wendy Chai	223	205	204	227	234	269	1362
	Zandra Aziela	194	211	255	211	205	245	1321
	Shalin Zulkifli	169	259	209	256	196	248	1337
2nd place, silver medalist(s)	South Korea (KOR)	1010	943	954	1035	1218	1156	6316
	Choi Jin-a	214	194	177	268	246	248	1347
	Hwang Sun-ok	231	168	182	156	249	216	1202
	Gang Hye-eun	179	188	184	214	213	202	1180
	Kim Yeau-jin	173	191	226	194	254	234	1272
	Nam Bo-ra	213	202	185	203	256	256	1315
3rd place, bronze medalist(s)	Singapore (SIN)	1026	1013	996	1085	1109	1010	6239
	Jennifer Tan	182	223	206	181	204	213	1209
	Cherie Tan	217	227	233	245	175	190	1287
	Evelyn Chan	214	156	170	257	205	193	1195
	Michelle Kwang	226	222	188	218	247	156	1257
	Valerie Teo	187	185	199	184	278	258	1291
4	China (CHN)	1027	1079	996	994	998	980	6074
	Zhang Chunli	210	205	170	181	248	187	1201
	Yang Suiling	214	245	208	184	190	202	1243
	Zhang Yuhong	200	208	226	213	195	182	1224
	Shen Yuye	210	220	211	227	190	197	1255
	Xu Lan	193	201	181	189	175	212	1151
5	Philippines (PHI)	1062	1027	981	1010	960	970	6010
	Liza del Rosario	235	236	186	193	223	224	1297
	Irene Garcia	171	171	186	191	171	201	1091
	Apple Posadas	233	192	235	237	212	191	1300
	Liza Clutario	209	204	182	218	199	178	1190
	Josephine Canare	214	224	192	171	155	176	1132
6	Indonesia (INA)	1059	959	1027	818	948	1097	5908
	Happy Ari Dewanti Soediyono	181	210	202	153	223	215	1184
	Tannya Roumimper	236	211	202	146	169	232	1196
	Renila Anisha Nugroho				170	168	222	560
	Novie Phang	204	178	205	149	183	202	1121
	Putty Armein	248	195	227	200	205	226	1301
	Ivana Hie	190	165	191				546
7	Chinese Taipei (TPE)	1041	1010	1021	946	962	925	5905
	Chien Hsiu-lan	244	192	223	193	173	200	1225
	Pan Yu-fen	220	221	168	202	183	186	1180
	Tsai Hsin-yi	212	213	233	179	220	192	1249
	Chu Yu-chieh				206	171	178	555
	Chou Miao-lin	184	201	193	166	215	169	1128
	Wang Yu-ling	181	183	204				568
8	Japan (JPN)	881	947	1034	902	872	1062	5698
	Kanako Ishimine	168	187	212	145	177	213	1102
	Maki Nakano				191	189	206	586
	Ayano Katai	182	151	199	153	171	203	1059
	Yuka Tsuchiya	173	222	174	225	168	239	1201
	Kumi Tsuzawa	187	199	226	188	167	201	1168
	Haruka Matsuda	171	188	223				582
9	Macau (MAC)	938	941	917	941	826	877	5440
	Julia Lam	212	170	142	205	172	176	1077
	Filomena Choi	213	191	196	198	142	210	1150
	Chan Weng Sam	182	200	170	201	175	178	1106
	Yuen Nga Lai	147	198	212	154	170	178	1059
	Alexandra Foo	184	182	197	183	167	135	1048
10	Bahrain (BRN)	888	948	856	812	837	897	5238
	Yasmin Al-Awadhi	198	209	214	161	202	232	1216
	Mariam Habib	186	176	133	182	156	171	1004
	Yasmin Al-Raees				153	154	134	441
	Fatima Al-Qaseer	158	181	167	158	159	165	988
	Nadia Al-Awadhi	188	234	170	158	166	195	1111
	Noora Majed Sultan	158	148	172				478
11	India (IND)	827	813	870	835	846	886	5077
	Sumathi Nallabantu	165	184	168	178	182	181	1058
	Judy Alban	164	142	176	169	163	182	996
	Sana Saleem	156	144	166	175	146	178	965
	Pratima Hegde	137	152	167	155	156	186	953
	Sabeena Saleem	205	191	193	158	199	159	1105
12	Kuwait (KUW)	819	719	755	873	871	648	4685
	Hanadi Al-Mezaiel	163	131	147	166	192	138	937
	Shaikha Al-Hendi	153	143	139	170	128	92	825
	Fatima Mohammad	187	151	131	153	169	112	903
	Bashaer Rashed	159	157	177	173	119	140	925
	Nora Al-Roudan	157	137	161	211	263	166	1095
Individuals
	Yasmin Al-Raees (BRN)	0	0	0				0
	Noora Majed Sultan (BRN)				0	0	0	0
	Vanessa Fung (HKG)	193	235	204	211	246	223	1312
	Janet Lam (HKG)	177	162	198	147	144	167	995
	Joey Yip (HKG)	191	181	200	214	188	167	1141
	Ivana Hie (INA)				184	152	211	547
	Renila Anisha Nugroho (INA)	213	189	187				589
	Sheela Kumari (IND)	168	199	161	166	132	166	992
	Haruka Matsuda (JPN)				196	247	234	677
	Maki Nakano (JPN)	187	169	190				546
	Veronika Solozhenkina (KAZ)	157	181	180	148	226	181	1073
	Kim Hyo-mi (KOR)	224	277	226	226	228	223	1404
	Farah Al-Mulla (KUW)	0	0	0	0	0	0	0
	Choi Pui Hing (MAC)	182	167	169	190	180	173	1061
	Choy Poh Lai (MAS)	194	203	197	157	207	189	1147
	Cecilia Yap (PHI)	180	223	198	195	183	226	1205
	Sabrina Lim (SIN)	224	214	187	189	180	167	1161
	Angkana Netrviseth (THA)	201	178	183	227	193	207	1189
	Saruta Songserm (THA)	176	171	205	178	162	160	1052
	Chu Yu-chieh (TPE)	203	212	181				596
	Wang Yu-ling (TPE)				198	226	154	578
