= Bowling at the 2010 Asian Games – Women's team =

Women's team of 5 at the 2010 Asian Games
- Venue: Tianhe Bowling Hall
- Date: 21–22 November 2010
- Competitors: 65 from 11 nations

Medalists
gold medal	South Korea; Choi Jin-a, Gang Hye-eun, Hong Su-yeon, Son Yun-hee, Hwang Sun-ok, Jeon Eun-hee
silver medal	Indonesia; Putty Armein, Ivana Hie, Novie Phang, Sharon Limansantoso, Tannya Roumimper, Shalima Zalsha
bronze medal	Malaysia; Esther Cheah, Sharon Koh, Zatil Iman, Shalin Zulkifli, Zandra Aziela, Jane Sin

The women's team of five competition at the 2010 Asian Games in Guangzhou was held on 21 and 22 November 2010 at Tianhe Bowling Hall.

== Schedule ==
All times are China Standard Time (UTC+08:00)

Date	Time	Event
Sunday, 21 November 2010	14:30	First block
Monday, 22 November 2010	14:30	Second block

== Results ==
Rank	Team	Game						Total
Rank	Team	1	2	3	4	5	6	Total
1st place, gold medalist(s)	South Korea (KOR)	1049	1036	1125	1028	1244	1229	6711
	Choi Jin-a	245	233	232	226	246	237	1419
	Gang Hye-eun				172	258	249	679
	Hong Su-yeon	191	219	234				644
	Son Yun-hee	227	172	207	180	236	247	1269
	Hwang Sun-ok	179	207	238	253	278	259	1414
	Jeon Eun-hee	207	205	214	197	226	237	1286
2nd place, silver medalist(s)	Indonesia (INA)	940	984	1247	1127	1054	988	6340
	Putty Armein	161	184	224	256	234	196	1255
	Ivana Hie	144	196	290	237	231	194	1292
	Novie Phang	204	213	290	223	179	203	1312
	Sharon Limansantoso	218	202	207	205	210	202	1244
	Tannya Roumimper	213	189	236	206	200	193	1237
3rd place, bronze medalist(s)	Malaysia (MAS)	1075	919	1089	1005	1046	1161	6295
	Esther Cheah	236	224	235	228	254	258	1435
	Sharon Koh	202	194	224	164	223	236	1243
	Zatil Iman	194	204	224	182	191	218	1213
	Shalin Zulkifli	220	147	216	206	174	226	1189
	Zandra Aziela	223	150	190	225	204	223	1215
4	Philippines (PHI)	916	936	984	1019	1122	1196	6173
	Liza Clutario	185	193	195	234	205	215	1227
	Liza del Rosario	170	206	201	198	257	244	1276
	Kimberly Lao	210	174	215	215	212	248	1274
	Apple Posadas	172	188	207	196	243	242	1248
	Lara Posadas	179	175	166	176	205	247	1148
5	China (CHN)	933	1062	1009	1081	1030	996	6111
	Zhang Yuhong	213	254	201	248	227	207	1350
	Yang Suiling	190	223	155	204	235	199	1206
	Chen Dongdong	153	235	222	214	198	228	1250
	Sun Hongdou	200	179	200	217	177	186	1159
	Xu Lan	177	171	231	198	193	176	1146
6	Japan (JPN)	1006	935	1024	1015	981	1117	6078
	Maki Nakano	201	147	191	208	155	215	1117
	Misaki Mukotani	213	170	200	210	190	235	1218
	Kanako Ishimine	187	197	212	207	224	207	1234
	Haruka Matsuda	201	196	214	175	210	237	1233
	Yukari Honma				215	202	223	640
	Nao Ohishi	204	225	207				636
7	Hong Kong (HKG)	934	945	978	1059	998	983	5897
	Chan Shuk Han	210	195	204	205	210	183	1207
	Vanessa Fung	192	195	217	202	208	211	1225
	Milki Ng	170	206	224	248	217	197	1262
	Zoe Tam	181	183	173	178	212	210	1137
	Sonia Ho	181	166	160	226	151	182	1066
8	Chinese Taipei (TPE)	986	1032	960	993	941	961	5873
	Pan Yu-fen	194	224	212	212	204	205	1251
	Tsai Hsin-yi	224	231	181	195	192	228	1251
	Wang Yu-ling	185	189	166	143	184	145	1012
	Yang Hao-ting	193	180	180	201	177	198	1129
	Tang Ya-chun	190	208	221	242	184	185	1230
9	Singapore (SIN)	929	961	866	1027	980	1092	5855
	Jasmine Yeong-Nathan	184	184	135	238	179	153	1073
	Jazreel Tan	181	165	167				513
	Cherie Tan	188	178	190	221	210	264	1251
	Geraldine Ng	158	193	182	203	170	215	1121
	New Hui Fen				197	185	245	627
	Shayna Ng	218	241	192	168	236	215	1270
10	Macau (MAC)	889	876	915	880	948	901	5409
	Chan Weng Sam	204	178	216	204	200	252	1254
	Un Im Cheng	177	194	160	161	186	122	1000
	Julia Lam	183	173	158	216	186	204	1120
	Hui Tong	159	199	178	148	196	169	1049
	Filomena Choi	166	132	203	151	180	154	986
11	Athletes from Kuwait (IOC)	740	726	780	795	869	739	4649
	Hanadi Al-Mezaiel	189	142	170	160	235	178	1074
	Bashaer Rashed	121	145	151	161	164	137	879
	Shaikha Al-Hendi	135	161	135	126	154	134	845
	Farah Al-Mulla	148	102	142	168	165	141	866
	Fatima Mohammad	147	176	182	180	151	149	985
Individuals
	Jiang Wei (CHN)	194	213	182	189	191	181	1150
	Shalima Zalsha (INA)	172	160	176	214	244	248	1214
	Pratima Hegde (IND)	163	204	164	173	208	169	1081
	Swapna Mitra (IND)	191	201	182	182	169	180	1105
	Abrar Al-Zanki (IOC)	118	104	121	0	0	0	343
	Yukari Honma (JPN)	195	254	214				663
	Nao Ohishi (JPN)				193	202	218	613
	Gang Hye-eun (KOR)	153	212	199				564
	Hong Su-yeon (KOR)				216	237	247	700
	Tchiang Sin U (MAC)	159	157	156	159	184	167	982
	Jane Sin (MAS)	149	180	182	204	267	220	1202
	Terveegiin Dorjderem (MGL)	0	0	0	0	0	0	0
	Shatarbalyn Gerlee (MGL)	0	0	0	0	0	0	0
	Sosoryn Khandaa (MGL)	0	0	0	0	0	0	0
	Tsodongiin Urantsetseg (MGL)	0	0	0	0	0	0	0
	Krizziah Tabora (PHI)	192	166	173	225	181	188	1125
	New Hui Fen (SIN)	168	248	228				644
	Jazreel Tan (SIN)				199	257	267	723
	Panacha Boonma (THA)	214	187	165	172	157	164	1059
	Apinyata Jonbumrung (THA)	170	204	167	165	213	188	1107
	Angkana Netrviseth (THA)	176	233	169	194	205	181	1158
	Benchawan Poungthong (THA)	210	180	235	156	176	207	1164
	Wang Ting-wen (TPE)	225	173	200	178	167	213	1156
