= Bowling at the 2018 Asian Games – Women's team =

Women's team of 6 at the 2018 Asian Games
- Venue: Jakabaring Bowling Center
- Date: 24 August 2018
- Competitors: 66 from 12 nations

Medalists
gold medal	South Korea; Baek Seung-ja, Han Byul, Kim Hyun-mi, Lee Yeon-ji, Ryu Seo-yeon, Lee Na-young
silver medal	Malaysia; Esther Cheah, Syaidatul Afifah, Natasha Roslan, Jane Sin, Siti Safiyah, Shalin Zulkifli
bronze medal	Chinese Taipei; Chang Yu-hsuan, Pan Yu-fen, Chou Chia-chen, Tsai Hsin-yi, Huang Chiung-yao, Wang Ya-ting

The women's team of six competition at the 2018 Asian Games in Palembang was held on 24 August 2018 at Jakabaring Bowling Center.

Block 1 were played on long oil pattern lane, while Block 2 were played on medium oil pattern lane.

== Schedule ==
All times are Western Indonesia Time (UTC+07:00)

Date	Time	Event
Friday, 24 August 2018	09:00	1st block
Friday, 24 August 2018	15:00	2nd block

== Results ==
Rank	Team	Game						Total
Rank	Team	1	2	3	4	5	6	Total
1st place, gold medalist(s)	South Korea (KOR)	1557	1350	1184	1355	1494	1398	8338
	Baek Seung-ja	266	214	223	190	229	220	1342
	Han Byul	254	209	193	256	245	234	1391
	Kim Hyun-mi	264	223	197	222	244	235	1385
	Lee Yeon-ji	266	230	198	243	232	234	1403
	Ryu Seo-yeon	265	232	169	200	255	233	1354
	Lee Na-young	242	242	204	244	289	242	1463
2nd place, silver medalist(s)	Malaysia (MAS)	1347	1312	1365	1407	1336	1382	8149
	Esther Cheah	220	230	220	267	148	213	1298
	Syaidatul Afifah	235	254	235	235	234	268	1461
	Natasha Roslan	267	184	236	222	268	223	1400
	Jane Sin	199	213	222	165	218	232	1249
	Siti Safiyah	206	221	208	265	224	251	1375
	Shalin Zulkifli	220	210	244	253	244	195	1366
3rd place, bronze medalist(s)	Chinese Taipei (TPE)	1387	1315	1316	1267	1343	1341	7969
	Chang Yu-hsuan	233	214	218	198	256	221	1340
	Pan Yu-fen	232	201	245	181	198	154	1211
	Chou Chia-chen	244	247	207	184	211	255	1348
	Tsai Hsin-yi	211	243	191	242	234	210	1331
	Huang Chiung-yao	213	213	222	219	245	256	1368
	Wang Ya-ting	254	197	233	243	199	245	1371
4	Philippines (PHI)	1307	1282	1327	1301	1371	1363	7951
	Liza del Rosario	255	169	229	244	244	267	1408
	Dyan Coronacion	244	205	242	188	256	177	1312
	Mades Arles	191	211	221	251	216	210	1300
	Rachelle Leon	211	221	202	203	187	190	1214
	Alexis Sy	190	255	179	214	235	254	1327
	Lara Posadas	216	221	254	201	233	265	1390
5	Indonesia (INA)	1317	1392	1177	1332	1345	1387	7950
	Sharon Limansantoso	233	246	200	224	232	191	1326
	Putty Armein	241	242	192	210	200	213	1298
	Alisha Nabila Larasati	197	188	167	233	232	196	1213
	Aldila Indryati	188	202	217	187	221	221	1236
	Nadia Pramanik Nuramalina	245	257	221	267	204	300	1494
	Tannya Roumimper	213	257	180	211	256	266	1383
6	Japan (JPN)	1261	1295	1361	1284	1377	1300	7878
	Yuri Sato	226	231	244	199	183	264	1347
	Megumi Kitamura	213	242	257	239	230	213	1394
	Hikaru Takekawa	191	165	188	198	199	161	1102
	Mirai Ishimoto	231	217	195	214	267	257	1381
	Futaba Imai	189	211	232	224	245	203	1304
	Misaki Mukotani	211	229	245	210	253	202	1350
7	Singapore (SGP)	1329	1187	1270	1224	1352	1312	7674
	Cherie Tan	218	196	192	195	266	168	1235
	Jazreel Tan	218	220	218	223	220	267	1366
	Joey Yeo	267	158	221	212	231	241	1330
	Daphne Tan	225	213	200	240	211	221	1310
	Bernice Lim	223	190	230	185	222	190	1240
	Shayna Ng	178	210	209	169	202	225	1193
8	Macau (MAC)	1334	1222	1250	1224	1201	1315	7546
	Wong Son Ian	214	211	231	243	213	233	1345
	Che Weng Si	178	220	246	191	191	223	1249
	Filomena Choi	232	188	197	189	222	210	1238
	Veronica de Souza	265	220	176	243	202	219	1325
	Julia Lam	255	196	180	157	190	231	1209
	Hui Tong	190	187	220	201	183	199	1180
9	Thailand (THA)	1285	1127	1096	1271	1318	1287	7384
	Yanee Saebe	263	178	174	231	214	232	1292
	Thitima Thongsaard	205	175	203	219	218	218	1238
	Kalyawat Ponganekkul	177	161	154	199	187	191	1069
	Thanchanok Vilailak	231	156	211	199	242	220	1259
	Natthida Sertluecha	177	228	188	179	234	202	1208
	Kantaporn Singhabubpha	232	229	166	244	223	224	1318
10	Mongolia (MGL)	983	995	917	908	954	1045	5802
	Khalzangiin Ölziikhorol	151	171	137	150	196	171	976
	Tsodongiin Urantsetseg	174	171	131	151	119	159	905
	Shatarbalyn Gerlee	190	119	179	186	178	134	986
	Luvsandagvyn Tsetsegsüren	154	175	152	144	131	216	972
	Tömörjavyn Dolgormaa	168	149	158	142	184	200	1001
	Samdangiin Delgertsetseg	146	210	160	135	146	165	962
11	Hong Kong (HKG)	608	582	558	584	592	537	3461
	Joan Cheng	206	172	154	195	234	185	1146
	Milki Ng	158	165	180	229	191	185	1108
	Chan Shuk Han	244	245	224	160	167	167	1207
12	Kazakhstan (KAZ)	527	619	535	630	469	606	3386
	Natalya Mandritsa	224	235	211	243	171	214	1298
	Natalya Orlova	189	172	167	179	155	165	1027
	Yelena Grishinenko	114	212	157	208	143	227	1061
