= Bowling at the 2006 Asian Games – Women's masters =

Women's masters at the 2006 Asian Games
- Venue: Qatar Bowling Center
- Date: 9–10 December 2006
- Competitors: 16 from 9 nations

Medalists
gold medal	Choi Jin-a	South Korea
silver medal	Esther Cheah	Malaysia
bronze medal	Kim Yeau-jin	South Korea

The women's masters competition at the 2006 Asian Games in Doha was held on 9 and 10 December 2006 at Qatar Bowling Centre.

The Masters event comprises the top 16 bowlers (maximum two per country) from the all-events competition.

== Schedule ==
All times are Arabia Standard Time (UTC+03:00)

Date	Time	Event
Saturday, 9 December 2006	12:30	First block
Sunday, 10 December 2006	09:00	Second block
Sunday, 10 December 2006	16:00	2nd/3rd place
Sunday, 10 December 2006	16:30	1st/2nd place

== Results ==
=== Preliminary ===
Rank	Athlete	Game																Total
Rank	Athlete	1	2	3	4	5	6	7	8	9	10	11	12	13	14	15	16	Total
1	Choi Jin-a (KOR)	203; 0	187; 0	232; 10	250; 10	255; 10	197; 0	212; 10	228; 10	217; 10	223; 0	257; 10	279; 10	242; 10	207; 0	245; 10	216; 0	3750
2	Kim Yeau-jin (KOR)	215; 10	235; 10	180; 0	219; 10	257; 10	186; 0	215; 10	178; 0	214; 0	256; 10	278; 10	206; 10	206; 10	234; 0	182; 0	225; 10	3586
3	Esther Cheah (MAS)	174; 0	224; 0	246; 10	215; 10	228; 10	200; 10	193; 0	246; 10	247; 10	232; 10	180; 0	204; 0	204; 0	215; 0	248; 10	226; 10	3572
4	Angkana Netrviseth (THA)	203; 0	180; 0	195; 0	255; 10	201; 0	236; 10	199; 0	233; 10	268; 10	162; 0	211; 0	218; 0	162; 0	245; 10	227; 0	246; 10	3501
5	Putty Armein (INA)	239; 10	211; 10	165; 0	205; 0	216; 10	227; 10	222; 10	221; 10	223; 10	202; 0	204; 10	213; 10	230; 0	205; 0	223; 10	191; 0	3497
6	Shalin Zulkifli (MAS)	228; 10	205; 10	208; 10	191; 10	200; 10	206; 10	204; 0	215; 0	202; 10	209; 10	206; 10	237; 10	201; 10	211; 5	201; 10	206; 10	3465
7	Kanako Ishimine (JPN)	171; 0	212; 10	205; 0	203; 0	233; 0	219; 10	181; 10	203; 0	217; 10	217; 10	168; 0	179; 0	222; 10	222; 0	247; 10	265; 10	3444
8	Yang Suiling (CHN)	190; 0	217; 10	205; 10	265; 10	205; 0	184; 0	218; 10	237; 10	166; 0	237; 0	236; 10	206; 0	227; 10	235; 10	164; 0	170; 0	3442
9	Valerie Teo (SIN)	278; 10	226; 10	233; 10	200; 0	225; 0	201; 0	163; 0	173; 0	168; 0	238; 10	202; 0	199; 10	222; 10	207; 10	206; 0	173; 0	3384
10	Liza del Rosario (PHI)	200; 0	169; 0	202; 10	202; 0	188; 0	157; 0	183; 0	180; 0	218; 0	204; 10	257; 10	216; 10	208; 0	211; 5	215; 10	288; 10	3363
11	Apple Posadas (PHI)	206; 10	181; 0	214; 10	191; 0	254; 10	208; 0	231; 10	212; 10	168; 0	189; 0	190; 0	180; 0	230; 10	207; 10	231; 0	187; 0	3349
12	Jennifer Tan (SIN)	193; 0	196; 0	195; 0	182; 0	193; 0	246; 10	162; 0	208; 10	277; 10	213; 0	182; 0	228; 10	216; 0	214; 10	192; 10	147; 0	3304
13	Zhang Yuhong (CHN)	213; 10	205; 10	189; 10	212; 0	205; 10	167; 0	148; 0	199; 10	182; 0	229; 10	190; 10	224; 0	167; 0	223; 10	235; 10	211; 10	3299
14	Happy Ari Dewanti Soediyono (INA)	223; 0	183; 10	186; 0	219; 10	173; 0	184; 10	213; 0	206; 0	213; 0	215; 0	214; 0	185; 0	196; 0	235; 10	188; 0	200; 0	3273
15	Yuka Tsuchiya (JPN)	192; 10	184; 0	222; 0	192; 0	149; 0	187; 0	221; 10	191; 0	232; 10	181; 0	165; 0	233; 10	234; 10	194; 0	184; 0	247; 10	3268
16	Tsai Hsin-yi (TPE)	247; 10	193; 0	196; 0	226; 10	192; 10	204; 10	204; 10	134; 0	181; 0	237; 10	200; 10	178; 0	219; 0	194; 0	163; 0	174; 0	3212

=== Stepladder finals ===
2nd/3rd place			1st/2nd place
			1	Choi Jin-a (KOR)	236	246	482
2	Kim Yeau-jin (KOR)	212	3	Esther Cheah (MAS)	199	198	397
3	Esther Cheah (MAS)	215
