= Bowling at the 2018 Asian Games =

- Venue: Jakabaring Bowling Center
- Dates: 22–27 August 2018
- Competitors: 166 from 18 nations

Bowling at the 2018 Asian Games was held at Jakabaring Bowling Center, Palembang, Indonesia from 22 August to 27 August 2018.

== Schedule ==
P	Preliminary	F	Final

Event↓/Date →	22nd Wed	23rd Thu	24th Fri	25th Sat	26th Sun	27th Mon	
Men's trios		F					
Men's team of 6				F			
Men's masters					P	P	F
Women's trios	F						
Women's team of 6			F				
Women's masters					P	P	F

== Medalists ==
=== Men ===
Event	Gold	Silver	Bronze
Trios	Japan; Tomoyuki Sasaki; Shogo Wada; Shusaku Asato	Malaysia; Timmy Tan; Ahmad Muaz Fishol; Muhammad Rafiq Ismail	Singapore; Alex Chong; Darren Ong; Jaris Goh
Team of 6	South Korea; Choi Bok-eum; Hong Hae-sol; Park Jong-woo; Kim Jong-wook; Koo Seong-hoi; Kang Hee-won	Hong Kong; Ivan Tse; Lau Kwun Ho; Wong Kwan Yuen; Eric Tseng; Michael Mak; Wu Siu Hong	Chinese Taipei; Wu Hao-ming; Chen Hsin-an; Hung Kun-yi; Chen Ming-tang; Lin Pai-feng; Hsieh Chin-liang
Masters	Muhammad Rafiq Ismail; Malaysia	Park Jong-woo; South Korea	Koo Seong-hoi; South Korea

=== Women ===
Event	Gold	Silver	Bronze
Trios	Malaysia; Esther Cheah; Siti Safiyah; Syaidatul Afifah	Chinese Taipei; Pan Yu-fen; Chou Chia-chen; Tsai Hsin-yi	Singapore; Joey Yeo; Daphne Tan; Bernice Lim
Team of 6	South Korea; Baek Seung-ja; Han Byul; Kim Hyun-mi; Lee Yeon-ji; Ryu Seo-yeon; Lee Na-young	Malaysia; Esther Cheah; Syaidatul Afifah; Natasha Roslan; Jane Sin; Siti Safiyah; Shalin Zulkifli	Chinese Taipei; Chang Yu-hsuan; Pan Yu-fen; Chou Chia-chen; Tsai Hsin-yi; Huang Chiung-yao; Wang Ya-ting
Masters	Mirai Ishimoto; Japan	Lee Yeon-ji; South Korea	Lee Na-young; South Korea

== Medal table ==
Rank	Nation	Gold	Silver	Bronze	Total
1	South Korea (KOR)	2	2	2	6
2	Malaysia (MAS)	2	2	0	4
3	Japan (JPN)	2	0	0	2
4	Chinese Taipei (TPE)	0	1	2	3
5	Hong Kong (HKG)	0	1	0	1
6	Singapore (SGP)	0	0	2	2
Totals (6 entries)		6	6	6	18

== Participating nations ==
A total of 166 athletes from 18 nations competed in bowling at the 2018 Asian Games:

- Bahrain (6)
- China (6)
- Chinese Taipei (12)
- Hong Kong (9)
- India (6)
- Indonesia (12)
- Japan (12)
- Kazakhstan (5)
- Macau (12)
- Malaysia (12)
- Mongolia (12)
- Philippines (12)
- Qatar (6)
- Saudi Arabia (6)
- Singapore (12)
- South Korea (12)
- Thailand (12)
- Vietnam (2)
