= Bowling at the 2018 Asian Games – Women's trios =

Women's trios at the 2018 Asian Games
- Venue: Jakabaring Bowling Center
- Date: 22 August 2018
- Competitors: 69 from 13 nations

Medalists
| gold medal | Malaysia; Esther Cheah, Siti Safiyah, Syaidatul Afifah |
| silver medal | Chinese Taipei; Pan Yu-fen, Chou Chia-chen, Tsai Hsin-yi |
| bronze medal | Singapore; Joey Yeo, Daphne Tan, Bernice Lim |

The women's trios competition at the 2018 Asian Games in Palembang was held on 22 August 2018 at Jakabaring Bowling Center. Block 1 were played on long oil pattern lane, while Block 2 were played on medium oil pattern lane.

== Schedule ==
All times are Western Indonesia Time (UTC+07:00)

| Date | Time | Event |
|---|---|---|
| Wednesday, 22 August 2018 | 10:00 | 1st block |
| Wednesday, 22 August 2018 | 14:30 | 2nd block |

== Results ==
| Rank | Team | Game | | | | | | Total |
| Rank | Team | 1 | 2 | 3 | 4 | 5 | 6 | Total |
|---|---|---|---|---|---|---|---|---|
| 1st place, gold medalist(s) | Malaysia 2 (MAS) | 688 | 734 | 762 | 711 | 701 | 730 | 4326 |
| | Esther Cheah | 231 | 246 | 231 | 251 | 215 | 265 | 1439 |
| | Siti Safiyah | 235 | 245 | 268 | 193 | 256 | 233 | 1430 |
| | Syaidatul Afifah | 222 | 243 | 263 | 267 | 230 | 232 | 1457 |
| 2nd place, silver medalist(s) | Chinese Taipei 2 (TPE) | 754 | 676 | 708 | 672 | 722 | 723 | 4255 |
| | Pan Yu-fen | 246 | 255 | 244 | 203 | 244 | 245 | 1437 |
| | Chou Chia-chen | 266 | 190 | 254 | 245 | 243 | 232 | 1430 |
| | Tsai Hsin-yi | 242 | 231 | 210 | 224 | 235 | 246 | 1388 |
| 3rd place, bronze medalist(s) | Singapore 2 (SGP) | 651 | 704 | 638 | 717 | 820 | 720 | 4250 |
| | Joey Yeo | 224 | 251 | 210 | 264 | 276 | 230 | 1455 |
| | Daphne Tan | 204 | 243 | 252 | 227 | 256 | 233 | 1415 |
| | Bernice Lim | 223 | 210 | 176 | 226 | 288 | 257 | 1380 |
| 4 | Malaysia 1 (MAS) | 706 | 725 | 720 | 614 | 715 | 664 | 4144 |
| | Jane Sin | 223 | 233 | 199 | 200 | 255 | 211 | 1321 |
| | Natasha Roslan | 243 | 275 | 275 | 172 | 221 | 242 | 1428 |
| | Shalin Zulkifli | 240 | 217 | 246 | 242 | 239 | 211 | 1395 |
| 5 | South Korea 1 (KOR) | 637 | 675 | 741 | 744 | 681 | 639 | 4117 |
| | Lee Yeon-ji | 233 | 253 | 244 | 201 | 206 | 229 | 1366 |
| | Ryu Seo-yeon | 219 | 200 | 243 | 289 | 243 | 179 | 1373 |
| | Lee Na-young | 185 | 222 | 254 | 254 | 232 | 231 | 1378 |
| 6 | Chinese Taipei 1 (TPE) | 719 | 643 | 677 | 703 | 676 | 676 | 4094 |
| | Chang Yu-hsuan | 233 | 245 | 211 | 255 | 200 | 223 | 1367 |
| | Wang Ya-ting | 245 | 179 | 225 | 254 | 224 | 234 | 1361 |
| | Huang Chiung-yao | 241 | 219 | 241 | 194 | 252 | 219 | 1366 |
| 7 | Philippines 2 (PHI) | 643 | 609 | 655 | 647 | 722 | 750 | 4026 |
| | Liza del Rosario | 212 | 168 | 254 | 214 | 212 | 220 | 1280 |
| | Alexis Sy | 186 | 253 | 201 | 245 | 253 | 263 | 1401 |
| | Lara Posadas | 245 | 188 | 200 | 188 | 257 | 267 | 1345 |
| 8 | Indonesia 2 (INA) | 683 | 662 | 700 | 703 | 622 | 606 | 3976 |
| | Aldila Indryati | 200 | 211 | 245 | 219 | 209 | 212 | 1296 |
| | Nadia Pramanik Nuramalina | 241 | 234 | 233 | 234 | 220 | 206 | 1368 |
| | Tannya Roumimper | 242 | 217 | 222 | 250 | 193 | 188 | 1312 |
| 9 | Singapore 1 (SGP) | 730 | 598 | 612 | 687 | 656 | 653 | 3936 |
| | Cherie Tan | 242 | 199 | 218 | 235 | 190 | 231 | 1315 |
| | Shayna Ng | 254 | 200 | 196 | 242 | 230 | 230 | 1352 |
| | Jazreel Tan | 234 | 199 | 198 | 210 | 236 | 192 | 1269 |
| 10 | Philippines 1 (PHI) | 591 | 651 | 607 | 704 | 648 | 722 | 3923 |
| | Mades Arles | 222 | 208 | 180 | 216 | 221 | 217 | 1264 |
| | Rachelle Leon | 177 | 202 | 187 | 242 | 230 | 279 | 1317 |
| | Dyan Coronacion | 192 | 241 | 240 | 246 | 197 | 226 | 1342 |
| 11 | South Korea 2 (KOR) | 628 | 638 | 576 | 726 | 579 | 732 | 3879 |
| | Han Byul | 201 | 203 | 160 | 245 | 175 | 278 | 1262 |
| | Kim Hyun-mi | 220 | 201 | 185 | 228 | 186 | 223 | 1243 |
| | Baek Seung-ja | 207 | 234 | 231 | 253 | 218 | 231 | 1374 |
| 12 | Japan 1 (JPN) | 635 | 624 | 632 | 679 | 650 | 637 | 3857 |
| | Yuri Sato | 225 | 208 | 221 | 256 | 172 | 204 | 1286 |
| | Megumi Kitamura | 189 | 192 | 189 | 211 | 210 | 225 | 1216 |
| | Hikaru Takekawa | 221 | 224 | 222 | 212 | 268 | 208 | 1355 |
| 13 | Indonesia 1 (INA) | 605 | 672 | 601 | 610 | 660 | 706 | 3854 |
| | Alisha Nabila Larasati | 176 | 221 | 222 | 224 | 223 | 256 | 1322 |
| | Putty Armein | 187 | 223 | 210 | 196 | 252 | 217 | 1285 |
| | Sharon Limansantoso | 242 | 228 | 169 | 190 | 185 | 233 | 1247 |
| 14 | Japan 2 (JPN) | 577 | 629 | 639 | 567 | 676 | 685 | 3773 |
| | Mirai Ishimoto | 201 | 234 | 241 | 193 | 244 | 224 | 1337 |
| | Futaba Imai | 211 | 209 | 178 | 183 | 209 | 209 | 1199 |
| | Misaki Mukotani | 165 | 186 | 220 | 191 | 223 | 252 | 1237 |
| 15 | Macau 1 (MAC) | 665 | 624 | 655 | 615 | 609 | 593 | 3761 |
| | Wong Son Ian | 220 | 243 | 232 | 231 | 214 | 231 | 1371 |
| | Che Weng Si | 253 | 181 | 222 | 171 | 205 | 202 | 1234 |
| | Filomena Choi | 192 | 200 | 201 | 213 | 190 | 160 | 1156 |
| 16 | China 1 (CHN) | 581 | 682 | 594 | 670 | 589 | 631 | 3747 |
| | Yang Liyan | 180 | 222 | 221 | 209 | 167 | 190 | 1189 |
| | Wang Xinlin | 192 | 208 | 197 | 266 | 233 | 222 | 1318 |
| | Zhang Chunli | 209 | 252 | 176 | 195 | 189 | 219 | 1240 |
| 17 | Thailand 1 (THA) | 640 | 676 | 608 | 647 | 600 | 575 | 3746 |
| | Yanee Saebe | 204 | 287 | 225 | 233 | 203 | 224 | 1376 |
| | Natthida Sertluecha | 218 | 186 | 209 | 221 | 183 | 170 | 1187 |
| | Kantaporn Singhabubpha | 218 | 203 | 174 | 193 | 214 | 181 | 1183 |
| 18 | Hong Kong 1 (HKG) | 663 | 672 | 612 | 637 | 630 | 523 | 3737 |
| | Joan Cheng | 228 | 196 | 176 | 246 | 195 | 155 | 1196 |
| | Milki Ng | 233 | 255 | 210 | 157 | 201 | 165 | 1221 |
| | Chan Shuk Han | 202 | 221 | 226 | 234 | 234 | 203 | 1320 |
| 19 | Macau 2 (MAC) | 673 | 601 | 527 | 687 | 586 | 647 | 3721 |
| | Veronica de Souza | 199 | 224 | 163 | 232 | 214 | 221 | 1253 |
| | Julia Lam | 242 | 200 | 192 | 231 | 151 | 218 | 1234 |
| | Hui Tong | 232 | 177 | 172 | 224 | 221 | 208 | 1234 |
| 20 | Kazakhstan 1 (KAZ) | 609 | 552 | 498 | 497 | 598 | 657 | 3411 |
| | Natalya Mandritsa | 179 | 218 | 203 | 199 | 221 | 264 | 1284 |
| | Natalya Orlova | 184 | 156 | 159 | 157 | 210 | 185 | 1051 |
| | Yelena Grishinenko | 246 | 178 | 136 | 141 | 167 | 208 | 1076 |
| 21 | Thailand 2 (THA) | 557 | 600 | 570 | 566 | 476 | 574 | 3343 |
| | Thitima Thongsaard | 208 | 210 | 157 | 178 | 195 | 228 | 1176 |
| | Kalyawat Ponganekkul | 196 | 215 | 234 | 167 | 137 | 162 | 1111 |
| | Thanchanok Vilailak | 153 | 175 | 179 | 221 | 144 | 184 | 1056 |
| 22 | Mongolia 1 (MGL) | 520 | 450 | 455 | 527 | 540 | 556 | 3048 |
| | Khalzangiin Ölziikhorol | 187 | 159 | 181 | 198 | 209 | 186 | 1120 |
| | Luvsandagvyn Tsetsegsüren | 179 | 149 | 129 | 176 | 163 | 160 | 956 |
| | Samdangiin Delgertsetseg | 154 | 142 | 145 | 153 | 168 | 210 | 972 |
| 23 | Mongolia 2 (MGL) | 493 | 484 | 507 | 420 | 475 | 527 | 2906 |
| | Tömörjavyn Dolgormaa | 154 | 147 | 186 | 158 | 163 | 167 | 975 |
| | Tsodongiin Urantsetseg | 156 | 135 | 159 | 151 | 132 | 163 | 896 |
| | Shatarbalyn Gerlee | 183 | 202 | 162 | 111 | 180 | 197 | 1035 |
