= Bowling at the 2006 Asian Games – Women's trios =

Women's trios at the 2006 Asian Games
- Venue: Qatar Bowling Center
- Date: 5–6 December 2006
- Competitors: 72 from 13 nations

Medalists
gold medal	South Korea; Kim Hyo-mi, Hwang Sun-ok, Nam Bo-ra
silver medal	Malaysia; Esther Cheah, Zandra Aziela, Shalin Zulkifli
bronze medal	South Korea; Choi Jin-a, Gang Hye-eun, Kim Yeau-jin

The women's trios competition at the 2006 Asian Games in Doha was held on 5 and 6 December 2006 at Qatar Bowling Centre.

== Schedule ==
All times are Arabia Standard Time (UTC+03:00)

Date	Time	Event
Tuesday, 5 December 2006	17:30	First block
Wednesday, 6 December 2006	09:00	Second block

== Results ==
Rank	Team	Game						Total
Rank	Team	1	2	3	4	5	6	Total
1st place, gold medalist(s)	South Korea 1 (KOR)	637	753	661	660	677	595	3983
	Kim Hyo-mi	191	212	213	213	205	202	1236
	Hwang Sun-ok	219	299	241	257	226	198	1440
	Nam Bo-ra	227	242	207	190	246	195	1307
2nd place, silver medalist(s)	Malaysia 1 (MAS)	674	713	651	603	659	673	3973
	Esther Cheah	231	267	181	201	195	224	1299
	Zandra Aziela	195	211	235	205	241	216	1303
	Shalin Zulkifli	248	235	235	197	223	233	1371
3rd place, bronze medalist(s)	South Korea 2 (KOR)	683	622	613	629	719	674	3940
	Choi Jin-a	238	195	204	239	279	199	1354
	Gang Hye-eun	206	182	202	189	224	237	1240
	Kim Yeau-jin	239	245	207	201	216	238	1346
4	Singapore 2 (SIN)	646	631	623	664	658	637	3884
	Jennifer Tan	183	193	210	225	248	221	1280
	Michelle Kwang	206	225	234	201	205	236	1307
	Valerie Teo	257	213	179	238	205	180	1272
5	China 1 (CHN)	628	631	641	619	626	670	3815
	Yang Suiling	187	201	255	206	228	235	1312
	Zhang Yuhong	192	237	175	201	205	236	1246
	Xu Lan	249	193	211	212	193	199	1257
6	Indonesia 1 (INA)	582	620	651	496	688	648	3685
	Tannya Roumimper	171	191	224	165	212	182	1145
	Happy Ari Dewanti Soediyono	190	258	215	147	222	199	1231
	Putty Armein	221	171	212	184	254	267	1309
7	Philippines 1 (PHI)	596	636	598	558	601	675	3664
	Liza del Rosario	177	268	193	203	234	217	1292
	Apple Posadas	244	179	205	160	196	225	1209
	Josephine Canare	175	189	200	195	171	233	1163
8	Japan 1 (JPN)	607	617	574	536	691	626	3651
	Ayano Katai	180	204	181	170	218	204	1157
	Yuka Tsuchiya	211	203	181	177	259	224	1255
	Kanako Ishimine	216	210	212	189	214	198	1239
9	Chinese Taipei 1 (TPE)	592	612	619	571	570	634	3598
	Chien Hsiu-lan	180	198	204	217	190	231	1220
	Tsai Hsin-yi	177	212	204	180	169	204	1146
	Chou Miao-lin	235	202	211	174	211	199	1232
10	Singapore 1 (SIN)	631	595	535	593	589	590	3533
	Cherie Tan	224	213	196	179	195	210	1217
	Sabrina Lim	170	224	154	212	214	194	1168
	Evelyn Chan	237	158	185	202	180	186	1148
11	Philippines 2 (PHI)	544	561	614	525	648	609	3501
	Liza Clutario	160	189	213	188	189	214	1153
	Irene Garcia	206	207	223	182	244	192	1254
	Cecilia Yap	178	165	178	155	215	203	1094
12	Malaysia 2 (MAS)	560	616	623	561	619	483	3462
	Wendy Chai	170	225	233	198	211	182	1219
	Choy Poh Lai	194	198	187	183	242	141	1145
	Sharon Koh	196	193	203	180	166	160	1098
13	Chinese Taipei 2 (TPE)	602	537	647	517	605	552	3460
	Chu Yu-chieh	197	184	220	194	205	192	1192
	Pan Yu-fen	202	186	222	176	203	193	1182
	Wang Yu-ling	203	167	205	147	197	167	1086
14	Hong Kong 1 (HKG)	592	546	630	547	572	564	3451
	Joey Yip	186	189	247	194	222	171	1209
	Janet Lam	207	165	189	170	164	176	1071
	Vanessa Fung	199	192	194	183	186	217	1171
15	Japan 2 (JPN)	570	529	616	619	619	497	3450
	Haruka Matsuda	191	166	201	170	208	167	1103
	Maki Nakano	180	145	212	245	220	197	1199
	Kumi Tsuzawa	199	218	203	204	191	133	1148
15	Macau 1 (MAC)	564	598	616	531	597	544	3450
	Julia Lam	203	206	222	178	220	177	1206
	Filomena Choi	201	168	200	162	194	212	1137
	Alexandra Foo	160	224	194	191	183	155	1107
17	Indonesia 2 (INA)	603	606	575	560	486	582	3412
	Renila Anisha Nugroho	128	191	173	189	197	205	1083
	Novie Phang	217	193	235	186	143	252	1226
	Ivana Hie	258	222	167	185	146	125	1103
18	Bahrain 1 (BRN)	536	510	579	542	561	543	3271
	Yasmin Al-Awadhi	149	175	198	166	156	187	1031
	Noora Majed Sultan	203	145	135	170	170	137	960
	Nadia Al-Awadhi	184	190	246	206	235	219	1280
19	India 1 (IND)	516	592	517	486	536	451	3098
	Sumathi Nallabantu	179	213	169	165	169	150	1045
	Pratima Hegde	196	199	160	163	194	141	1053
	Sabeena Saleem	141	180	188	158	173	160	1000
20	Macau 2 (MAC)	533	521	476	496	516	485	3027
	Choi Pui Hing	199	182	147	177	202	158	1065
	Chan Weng Sam	166	157	161	148	170	179	981
	Yuen Nga Lai	168	182	168	171	144	148	981
21	Bahrain 2 (BRN)	541	452	474	461	466	527	2921
	Mariam Habib	192	146	179	177	170	158	1022
	Yasmin Al-Raees	154	125	108	119	139	183	828
	Fatima Al-Qaseer	195	181	187	165	157	186	1071
22	Kuwait 1 (KUW)	500	463	457	432	448	505	2805
	Nora Al-Roudan	187	182	165	158	151	193	1036
	Fatima Mohammad	164	130	141	130	129	147	841
	Hanadi Al-Mezaiel	149	151	151	144	168	165	928
23	India 2 (IND)	528	455	480	453	401	467	2784
	Judy Alban	162	129	173	140	144	168	916
	Sana Saleem	160	176	159	161	150	148	954
	Sheela Kumari	206	150	148	152	107	151	914
24	Kuwait 2 (KUW)	495	440	526	418	343	229	2451
	Shaikha Al-Hendi	132	136	175	142	153	105	843
	Farah Al-Mulla	145	143	145	135	43	0	611
	Bashaer Rashed	218	161	206	141	147	124	997
Individuals
	Shen Yuye (CHN)	221	180	162	175	183	182	1103
	Zhang Chunli (CHN)	174	182	219	201	248	186	1210
	Veronika Solozhenkina (KAZ)	187	162	165	150	172	179	1015
	Angkana Netrviseth (THA)	233	235	215	212	182	205	1282
	Saruta Songserm (THA)	169	221	179	178	186	159	1092
