= Bowling at the 2019 SEA Games – Women's team of 4 =

Bowling – Women's team of 4 at the 2019 SEA Games
- Venue: Coronado Lanes, Starmall EDSA-Shaw
- Location: Mandaluyong, Philippines
- Date: 6 December 2019
- Competitors: 24 from 6 nations

Medalists
gold medal	Daphne Tan; New Hui Fen; Shayna Ng; Cherie Tan	Singapore
silver medal	Esther Cheah; Sin Li Jane; Shalin Zulkifli; Siti Safiyah	Malaysia
bronze medal	Alexis Sy; Liza Del Rosario; Lara Posadas-Wong; Bea Hernandez	Philippines

The women's team of four competition for bowling at the 2019 SEA Games in Philippines was held on 6 December 2019 at Coronado Lanes, Starmall EDSA-Shaw.

== Schedule ==
All times are Philippine Standard Time (UTC+8).

Date	Time	Squad
Fri, 6 December 2019	09:00	1st block
Fri, 6 December 2019	14:00	2nd block

== Results ==
Detailed result as in below:

Rank	Team	Game						Total
Rank	Team	1	2	3	4	5	6	Total
1st place, gold medalist(s)	Singapore (SGP)	860	739	834	801	858	741	4833
	Daphne Tan	202	189	159	160	245	150	1105
	New Hui Fen	206	177	234	202	233	169	1221
	Shayna Ng	204	169	208	244	180	193	1198
	Cherie Tan	248	204	233	195	200	229	1309
2nd place, silver medalist(s)	Malaysia (MAS)	730	820	833	723	860	837	4803
	Esther Cheah	177	239	215	170	224	170	1195
	Sin Li Jane	179	181	195	171	258	226	1210
	Shalin Zulkifli	203	176	169	193	183	196	1120
	Siti Safiyah	171	224	254	189	195	245	1278
3rd place, bronze medalist(s)	Philippines (PHI)	876	866	710	729	786	768	4735
	Alexis Sy	199	258	157	159	193	203	1169
	Liza Del Rosario	161	179	162	179	183	147	1011
	Lara Posadas-Wong	238	192	189	169	204	193	1185
	Bea Hernandez	278	237	202	222	206	225	1370
4	Indonesia (INA)	799	825	758	783	754	777	4696
	Sharon Limansantoso	187	196	179	188	169	168	1087
	Nadia Pramanik	193	189	191	224	220	205	1222
	Aldila Indryati	224	226	183	176	172	209	1190
	Tannya Roumimper	195	214	205	195	193	195	1197
5	Thailand (THA)	723	671	725	778	713	739	4349
	Kantaporn Singhabubpha	204	151	204	188	176	147	1070
	Khattiya Ngoenkham	151	161	147	176	162	175	972
	Pitchapa Reongsiri	185	170	174	210	196	216	1151
	Yanee Saebe	183	189	200	204	179	201	1156
6	Brunei (BRU)	682	782	711	638	677	714	4204
	Siti Hawa Natasya	172	171	181	146	178	166	1014
	Dayangku Nadia Nabila	151	185	172	159	158	184	1009
	Fatin Nur Ashikin	170	201	160	162	183	173	1049
	Fatin Adilah Haji Mahadi	189	225	198	171	158	191	1132
