= Sin Li Jane =

Sin Li Jane is a Malaysian tenpin bowler from Ipoh, Perak. As of May 2026, she had won six titles on the Professional Women's Bowling Association Tour. They include the 2024 U.S. Women's Open and the 2024 PWBA Tour Championship.

Her four title season in 2024 made her the first Asian bowler to receive the PWBA Player of the Year award. Representing Malaysia, Sin was part of the team that won gold at the 2017 World Bowling Championships. She also won three gold medals at the 2024 Asian Championships.

== Early life and education ==
Sin was born in Pasir Puteh in Ipoh. She began bowling at the Royal Perak Golf Club when she was eight and represented Perak the following year. At 14, she moved to Kuala Lumpur, where she studied at Bukit Jalil Sports School and trained at Sunway Megalanes.

== Bowling career ==
=== 2007 to 2014 ===
Sin won team bronze at the 2007 Asian Indoor Games. At the 2008 Commonwealth Tenpin Bowling Championships, she earned two gold and three silver medals. She also took team silver at the 2008 Asian Championships.

In 2010, Sin won team bronze at both the Asian Games and the World Youth Championships. She won one gold and one silver medal at the 2012 Asian Championships, followed by team bronze at the 2013 World Bowling Women's Championships. Her other wins during this period included the Singapore Open in 2010, 2013 and 2014.

=== 2015 to 2023 ===
At the 2015 SEA Games in Singapore, Sin and Esther Cheah won the women's doubles. Sin also bowled for the Malaysian women's team that won gold. She won doubles gold at the Asian Championships in 2015 and 2016.

Sin joined the PWBA Tour in 2016. In June 2017, she and Siti Safiyah became the first Malaysian winners on the tour. Siti won the Wichita Open before Sin defeated Thashaina Seraus by 222 to 186 in the Lincoln Open final.

Later in 2017, Malaysia won the team gold at the World Bowling Championships in Las Vegas. Sin also earned silver in doubles with Shalin Zulkifli and silver in Masters. At the SEA Games that year, she won gold in mixed doubles, trios and team, along with silver in singles.

Sin won the Brunswick Ballmaster Open in 2018 and finished second at the QubicaAMF Bowling World Cup. She and Natasha Roslan won doubles bronze at the 2022 World Games. At the 2023 IBF World Championships, Sin took silver in singles and in the women's team event.

=== 2024 to present ===
After three seasons away from the PWBA Tour, Sin returned in 2024. She won the Rockford Open, the Greater Nashville Classic, the U.S. Women's Open and the PWBA Tour Championship.

The U.S. Women's Open was her first major title. Sin defeated Diana Zavjalova by 226 to 214 and became the first Malaysian to win the event. She later beat Jordan Richard by 215 to 209 in the Tour Championship final. The fourth title secured her Player of the Year season.

At the 2024 Asian Championships in Bangkok, Sin won gold in doubles with Natasha Roslan, all events and Masters. She also earned silver in trios and team.

Sin finished second at the 2025 USBC Queens after losing the title match to Josie Barnes by 211 to 198. In May 2026, she won her sixth PWBA title at the Rockford Open, where she defeated New Hui Fen by 257 to 234. She was runner up at the 2026 U.S. Women's Open after losing a roll off to Jillian Martin by one pin.
