= Bowling at the 2007 SEA Games =

Bowling at the 2007 SEA Games was held at the SF Strike Bowl in Bangkok, Thailand. The bowling schedule began on December 8 to December 14.

== Medal tally ==
* Host nation (Thailand)

Rank	Nation	Gold	Silver	Bronze	Total
1	Malaysia	4	3	6	13
2	Singapore	3	0	1	4
3	Thailand*	2	4	2	8
4	Indonesia	2	3	2	7
5	Philippines	0	1	0	1
Totals (5 entries)		11	11	11	33

== Medalists ==
=== Men ===
Event	Gold	Silver	Bronze
Singles	Shaun Ng Qenn; Singapore	Alex Liew Kien Liang; Malaysia	Zulmazran Zulkifli; Malaysia
Doubles	Thailand (THA); Annop Aromsaranon; Phoemphun Yakasem	Thailand (THA); Somjed Kusonpithak; Yannaphon Larpapharat	Malaysia (MAS); Aaron Kong Eng Chuan; Zulmazran Zulkifli
Trios	Singapore (SIN); Jason Yeong-Nathan; Remy Ong; Shaun Ng Qenn	Indonesia (INA); Haqi Rumandung; Oscar; Ryan Leonard Lalisang	Malaysia (MAS); Aaron Kong Eng Chuan; Adrian Ang Hsien Loong; Zulmazran Zulkifli
Team of five	Thailand (THA); Bodin Lertpiriyasakulkit; Phoemphun Yakasem; Somjed Kusonpithak; Surasak Manuwong; Yannaphon Larpapharat	Malaysia (MAS); Aaron Kong Eng Chuan; Adrian Ang Hsien Loong; Alex Liew Kien Liang; Daniel Lim Tow Chuang; Zulmazran Zulkifli	Indonesia (INA); Dennis Ranova Pulunggono; Haqi Rumandung; Oscar; Rangga Dwichandra Yudhira; Ryan Leonard Lalisang
Masters	Remy Ong; Singapore	Ryan Leonard Lalisang; Indonesia	Zulmazran Zulkifli; Malaysia

=== Women ===
Event	Gold	Silver	Bronze
Singles	Tannya Roumimper; Indonesia	Angkana Netrviseth; Thailand	Shalin Zulkifli; Malaysia
Doubles	Malaysia (MAS); Esther Cheah Mei Lan; Zatil Iman Abdul Ghani	Thailand (THA); Angkana Netrviseth; Saowapha Kunaksorn	Malaysia (MAS); Shalin Zulkifli; Siti Safiyah Amirah
Trios	Malaysia (MAS); Esther Cheah Mei Lan; Shalin Zulkifli; Zatil Iman Abdul Ghani	Thailand (THA); Angkana Netrviseth; Gunnalada Aree; Saowapha Kunaksorn	Singapore (SIN); Amanda Ng; Evelyn Chan; Jasmine Yeong-Nathan
Team of five	Malaysia (MAS); Esther Cheah Mei Lan; Shalin Zulkifli; Sharon Koh Suet Len; Siti Safiyah Amirah; Zatil Iman Abdul Ghani	Indonesia (INA); Happy Ari Dewanti Soediyono; Putty Insavilla Armein; Shalima Zalsha; Sharon Limansantoso; Tannya Roumimper	Thailand (THA); Angkana Netrviseth; Gunnalada Aree; Husanee Chupinij; Saowapha Kunaksorn; Thanyarat Lerdcharoentrakul
Masters	Sharon Limansantoso; Indonesia	Esther Cheah Mei Lan; Malaysia	Tannya Roumimper; Indonesia

=== Mixed ===
Event	Gold	Silver	Bronze
Doubles	Malaysia (MAS); Shalin Zulkifli; Zulmazran Zulkifli	Philippines (PHI); Engelberto Rivera; Maria Iza del Rosario	Thailand (THA); Angkana Netrviseth; Yannaphon Larpapharat
