= Ryan Leonard =

Ryan Leonard may refer to:

- Ryan Leonard (footballer) (born 1992), English footballer
- Ryan Leonard (ice hockey) (born 2005), American ice hockey player
- Ryan Leonard Lalisang (born 1980), Indonesian ten-pin bowler
