= Bowling at the 2005 SEA Games =

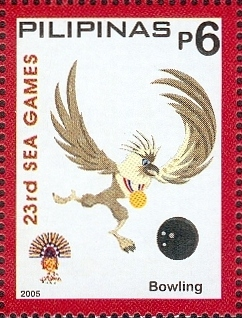
- Logo of bowling at the 2005 Southeast Asian Games on a 2005 stamp of the Philippines
- Venue: Pearl Bowling Center
- Location: Parañaque, Metro Manila
- Date: November 27 – December 4, 2005

Bowling at the 2005 SEA Games took place in the Pearl Bowling Center in Parañaque, Metro Manila, Philippines.

== Medal table ==
* Host nation (Philippines)

Rank	Nation	Gold	Silver	Bronze	Total
1	Philippines*	4	6	0	10
2	Malaysia	3	3	3	9
3	Indonesia	3	0	4	7
4	Singapore	0	2	2	4
Totals (4 entries)		10	11	9	30

== Medalists ==
=== Men ===
Event	Gold	Silver	Bronze
Singles	Ryan Leonard Lalisang; Indonesia	Markwin Tee; Philippines	Lie Joe Tjam; Indonesia
Doubles	Philippines; Christian Jan Suarez; Ernesto Gatchalian Jr.	Malaysia; Alex Liew Kien Liang; Ben Heng Boon Hian	Malaysia; Daniel Lim Tow Chuang; Aaron Kong Eng Chuan
Trios	Malaysia; Daniel Lim Tow Chuang; Aaron Kong Eng Chuan; Zulmazran Zulkifli	Philippines; Christian Jan Suarez; Ernesto Gatchalian Jr. Constantine Chester King	Malaysia; Alex Liew Kien Liang; Ben Heng Boon Hian; Azidi Ameran
Team of five	Malaysia; Daniel Lim Tow Chuang; Aaron Kong Eng Chuan; Zulmazran Zulkifli; Alex Liew Kien Liang; Ben Heng Boon Hian	Philippines; Christian Jan Suarez; Ernesto Gatchalian Jr. Constantine Chester King; Markwin Tee; Tyrone Christopher Ongpauco	Singapore; Remy Ong; Terence Tan Siong Koon; Lee Yu Wen; Goh Heng Soon; Jason Yeong Nathan
Masters	Markwin Tee; Philippines	Remy Ong; Singapore	Ryan Leonard Lalisang; Indonesia

=== Women ===
Event	Gold	Silver	Bronze
Singles	Maria Cecilia Yap; Philippines	Zandra Aziela; Malaysia	Novie Phang; Indonesia
Doubles	Indonesia; Happy Ari Dewanti Soediyono; Putty Armein	Malaysia; Wendy Chai de Choo; Zandra Aziela	shared silver
Doubles	Indonesia; Happy Ari Dewanti Soediyono; Putty Armein	Philippines; Maria Cecilia Yap; Liza Clutario	shared silver
Trios	Indonesia; Happy Ari Dewanti Soediyono; Putty Armein; Novie Phang	Philippines; Maria Cecilia Yap; Liza Clutario; Maria Liza del Rosario	Malaysia; Wendy Chai de Choo; Zandra Aziela; Esther Cheah
Team of five	Malaysia; Wendy Chai de Choo; Zandra Aziela; Esther Cheah; Crystal Choy Poh Lai; Lai Kin Ngoh	Philippines; Maria Cecilia Yap; Liza Clutario; Maria Liza del Rosario; Elaine Florencio; Josephine Canare	Singapore; Kwang Tien Mei; Evelyn Chan; Jazreel Tan; Tan Bee Leng; Tay Hong Keow
Masters	Liza Clutario; Philippines	Jazreel Tan; Singapore	Putty Armein; Indonesia
