= Bowling at the 2017 SEA Games =

- Venue: Sunway Mega Lanes
- Location: Petaling Jaya, Selangor, Malaysia
- Dates: 20–25 August 2017
- Nations: 7

The bowling competitions at the 2017 SEA Games in Kuala Lumpur were held at Sunway Mega Lanes in Selangor.

The 2017 Games will feature competitions in eleven events (men 5 events, women 5 events and mixed 1 events).

== Events ==
The following events will be contested:

- Singles
- Doubles
- Mixed doubles
- Trios
- Masters
- Team of five

== Participation ==
=== Participating nations ===
- Indonesia (12)
- Malaysia (12)
- Myanmar (6)
- Philippines (12)
- Singapore (12)
- Thailand (12)
- Vietnam (9)

== Medal summary ==
=== Medal table ===
* Host nation (Malaysia)

Rank	Nation	Gold	Silver	Bronze	Total
1	Malaysia*	7	4	3	14
2	Singapore	2	3	2	7
3	Indonesia	1	2	3	6
4	Thailand	1	2	2	5
5	Philippines	0	0	1	1
Totals (5 entries)		11	11	11	33

=== Men's events ===
Event	Gold	Silver	Bronze
Singles	Muhammad Rafiq Ismail; Malaysia	Adrian Ang Hsien Loong; Malaysia	Yeri Ramadona; Indonesia
Doubles	Malaysia; Alex Liew; Syafiq Ridhwan Abdul Malik	Malaysia; Adrian Ang Hsien Loong; Muhammad Rafiq Ismail	Indonesia; Billy Muhammad Islam; Hardy Rachmadian
Trios	Thailand; Atchariya Cheng; Sithiphol Kunaksorn; Surasak Manuwong	Thailand; Annop Arromsaranon; Erik Kim Bolleby; Yannaphon Larpapharat	Indonesia; Billy Muhammad Islam; Hardy Rachmadian; Ryan Leonard Lalisang
Team of five	Singapore; Basil Dill Ng Jui Chang; Cheah Ray Han; Muhammad Jaris Goh; Darren Ong Wei Siong; Keith Saw Hui-xun; Timothy Tham Fu Rong	Indonesia; Billy Muhammad Islam; Diwan Rezaldy Syahril; Hardy Rachmadian; Hengki; Ryan Leonard Lalisang; Yeri Ramadona	Thailand; Atchariya Cheng; Annop Arromsaranon; Erik Kim Bolleby; Sithiphol Kunaksorn; Surasak Manuwong; Yannaphon Larpapharat
Masters	Muhammad Rafiq Ismail; Malaysia	Yannaphon Larpapharat; Thailand	Alex Liew; Malaysia

=== Women's events ===
Event	Gold	Silver	Bronze
Singles	Cherie Tan Shi Hua; Singapore	Sin Li Jane; Malaysia	Shalin Zulkifli; Malaysia
Doubles	Indonesia; Sharon Limansantoso; Tannya Roumimper	Singapore; Cherie Tan Shi Hua; New Hui Fen	Singapore; Daphne Tan Shi Jing; Shayna Ng Lin Zi
Trios	Malaysia; Esther Cheah Mei Lan; Shalin Zulkifli; Sin Li Jane	Singapore; Cherie Tan Shi Hua; New Hui Fen; Shayna Ng Lin Zi	Malaysia; Natasha Roslan; Siti Safiyah Amirah Ab Rahman; Syaidatul Afifah
Team of five	Malaysia; Esther Cheah Mei Lan; Natasha Roslan; Shalin Zulkifli; Sin Li Jane; Siti Safiyah Amirah Ab Rahman; Syaidatul 'Afifah Badrul Hamidi	Singapore; Jazreel Tan Shi Hua; Bernice Lim Hui Ying; New Hui Fen; Shayna Ng Lin Zi; Cherie Tan Shi Hua; Daphne Tan Shi Jing	Philippines; Dyan Arcel Coronacion; Krizziah Lyn Tabora; Maria Liza Del Rosario; Maria Lourdes Arles; Marian Lara Posadas; Marie Alexis Sy
Masters	Shalin Zulkifli; Malaysia	Tannya Roumimper; Indonesia	Shayna Ng Lin Zi; Singapore

=== Mixed events ===
Event	Gold	Silver	Bronze
Doubles	Malaysia; Muhammad Rafiq Ismail; Sin Li Jane	Malaysia; Alex Liew; Shalin Zulkifli	Thailand; Annop Arromsaranon; Yanee Saebe

== See also ==
- Bowling at the 2017 ASEAN Para Games
