= Junaidah Aman =

Malaysian sprinter

Personal information
- Nationality: Malaysian
- Born: 18 February 1955 (age 70) Taiping, British Malaya

Sport
- Sport: Sprinting
- Event: 400 metres

Junaidah Aman (born 18 February 1955) is a Malaysian sprinter. She competed in the women's 400 metres at the 1972 Summer Olympics.
