= Ryan Leonard Lalisang =

Indonesian ten-pin bowler

Personal information
- Nationality: Indonesian
- Born: 21 August 1980 (age 45) Balikpapan, East Kalimantan

Sport
- Sport: Bowling

Achievements and titles
- World finals: 2009 AMF Bowling World Cup : 3rd Place
- Regional finals: 2007 Kuwait Open : Champion
Medal record
Men's bowling
Representing Indonesia
Asian Games
| Gold medal – first place | 2006 Doha | Men's singles |
Asian Championships
| Gold medal – first place | 2006 | Men's singles |
Asian Indoor and Martial Arts Games
| Bronze medal – third place | 2009 Hanoi | Men's doubles |
Southeast Asian Games
| Gold medal – first place | 2005 Manila | Men's singles |
| Gold medal – first place | 2019 Philippines | Mixed doubles |
| Silver medal – second place | 2007 Nakhon Ratchasima | Men's trios |
| Silver medal – second place | 2007 Nakhon Ratchasima | Men's masters |
| Silver medal – second place | 2015 Singapore | Men's doubles |
| Silver medal – second place | 2015 Singapore | Men's Team of five |
| Silver medal – second place | 2017 Kuala Lumpur | Men's team of five |
| Silver medal – second place | 2019 Philippines | Men's masters |
| Bronze medal – third place | 2005 Manila | Men's masters |
| Bronze medal – third place | 2007 Nakhon Ratchasima | Men's team of five |
| Bronze medal – third place | 2011 Jakarta | Men's team of five |
| Bronze medal – third place | 2015 Singapore | Men's trios |
| Bronze medal – third place | 2017 Kuala Lumpur | Men's trios |

Ryan Leonard Lalisang (born 21 August 1980 in Balikpapan, Kalimantan Timur) is an Indonesian ten-pin bowler.

== Career ==
Ryan Leonard Lalisang finished 11th position of the combined rankings at the 2006 AMF Bowling World Cup, Caracas, Venezuela. He won the gold medal in Sea Games 2005 in Manila, Asian Bowling Championships 2006 and Asian Games 2006 Doha, Qatar for the Indonesian bowling national team. He won Kuwait open 2007 Kuwait. He got bronze on men's double in Asian Indoor and Martial Arts Games in 2009, Vietnam. He finished 3rd position at the 2009 AMF Bowling World Cup Malacca, Malaysia. He got 5 Gold medals at PON KALTIM 2008,Samarinda. He is now #1 Bowler in Indonesia for 10 times.
