= Esther Cheah =

Malaysian ten-pin bowling player

Personal information
- Native name: Cheah Mei Lan
- Full name: Esther Cheah Mei Lan
- Nationality: Malaysian
- Born: 31 March 1986 (age 40) Petaling Jaya, Selangor, Malaysia
- Height: 164 cm (5 ft 5 in)
- Weight: 50 kg (110 lb)

Sport
- Country: Malaysia
- Sport: Bowling
- Events: singles, trio, team of 5, masters
Medal record
Women's Ten-pin Bowling
Representing Malaysia
Event	1st	2nd	3rd
World Bowling Championships	3	1	1
Asian Games	3	4	1
Southeast Asian Games	8	2	3
Total	14	7	5
WTBA World Tenpin Bowling Championships
Gold medal – first place	2005 Aalborg	singles
Gold medal – first place	2007 Monterrey	team of five
Gold medal – first place	2017 Las Vegas	team of five
Silver medal – second place	2023 Kuwait	team of five
Bronze medal – third place	2013 Henderson	team of five
Asian Bowling Championships
Gold medal – first place	2008 Hong Kong	doubles
Gold medal – first place	2016 Hong Kong	doubles
Gold medal – first place	2019 Kuwait	masters
Gold medal – first place	2019 Kuwait	trios
Silver medal – second place	2008 Hong Kong	team of five
Silver medal – second place	2016 Hong Kong	team of five
Silver medal – second place	2019 Kuwait	team of five
Bronze medal – third place	2004 Bangkok	team of five
Bronze medal – third place	2016 Hong Kong	all events
Bronze medal – third place	2019 Kuwait	doubles
Asian Games
Gold medal – first place	2006 Doha	singles
Gold medal – first place	2006 Doha	team of five
Gold medal – first place	2018 Jakarta-Palembang	trios
Silver medal – second place	2006 Doha	trios
Silver medal – second place	2006 Doha	all events
Silver medal – second place	2006 Doha	masters
Silver medal – second place	2018 Jakarta-Palembang	team of six
Bronze medal – third place	2010 Gangzhou	team of five
Southeast Asian Games
Gold medal – first place	2005 Manila	team of five
Gold medal – first place	2007 Bangkok	doubles
Gold medal – first place	2007 Bangkok	trios
Gold medal – first place	2007 Bangkok	team of five
Gold medal – first place	2015 Singapore	doubles
Gold medal – first place	2015 Singapore	team of five
Gold medal – first place	2017 Kuala Lumpur	trios
Gold medal – first place	2017 Kuala Lumpur	team of five
Silver medal – second place	2007 Bangkok	masters
Silver medal – second place	2019 Philippines	team of four
Bronze medal – third place	2005 Manila	trio
Bronze medal – third place	2015 Singapore	singles
Bronze medal – third place	2019 Philippines	doubles

Esther Cheah Mei Lan (born 31 March 1986) is a Malaysian female medal winning tenpin bowler who has represented Malaysia in several international competitive events including Asian Games, Southeast Asian Games. She is currently considered one of the most experienced and finest female bowlers to have represented Malaysia internationally.

== Biography ==
Cheah was born in Petaling Jaya on 31 March 1986. Her father Holloway Cheah inspired her to practice the sport of bowling during her childhood as her father was also a former tenpin bowler who claimed a gold medal in bowling at the 1978 Asian Games. Cheah is also coached by her own father who is also the current national coach for the Malaysian tenpin bowling team.

== Career ==
Cheah rose to prominence in international level after claiming a stunning gold medal just at the age of 19 in the women's singles at the 2005 WTBA World Tenpin Bowling Championships, which was also her first senior level competitive event.

After her debut success at the 2005 WTBA Championships, she made her Asian Games debut representing Malaysia at the 2006 Asian Games and went onto claim 6 medals including 2 gold and 4 silver medals at the 2006 Asian Games. During the event, she also registered in history for becoming the first Malaysian female to win an Asian Games gold in women's singles bowling event after defeating Indonesian Putty Armein in the final. At the 2006 Asian Games, Cheah followed the footsteps of her father by winning gold in the team of five category at an Asian Games competition whereas her father also clinched gold medal in the relevant event for men during the 1978 Asian Games.

She was nominated as one of the recipients for the Malaysian prestigious sport award Anugerah Sukan Negara for Sportswoman of the Year in 2006 and 2012. She was part of the Malaysian women's bowling team which received the 2017 Team of the Year award at the 2017 Malaysian National Sports Awards.

Cheah claimed her third Asian Games gold medal and her first Asian Games gold medal since 2006 in the women's trio event at the 2018 Asian Games. This also ultimately became the first gold medal for Malaysia at the 2018 Asian Games and also was the first Asian Games gold medal in bowling for Malaysia at the Asian Games since 2006. However Malaysian women's bowling team couldn't secure a gold medal in the women's team of six event during the 2018 Asian Games as they were thrashed by South Korea.
