= Sabeena Saleem =

Indian bowler from Tamil Nadu (born 1968)

Sabeena Saleem Athika (born 1968) is an Indian bowler from Tamil Nadu. She has won four national championships. She has also participated in five AMF World Cups. In 2006, along with her 20-year-old daughter Sana, Sabeena captured the National Bowling Doubles Championship.

== Early life ==
Sabeena Saleem was born in India to a Muslim family. She studied in the M.W.A School(Conran Smith Road, Chennai) then in Adarsh Vidyalaya in Chennai. She married a businessman, Anwar Saleem, when she was 18 years old, thus leaving her academic and sports career. From her school days, Sabeena was an athlete and sports enthusiast. Sabeena represented her school in throwball, cricket and basketball. She won a lot of trophies in her teenage days. After that, she took up a course to become a fashion designer. It was not until 1998, when she was 30 years old, that she took to the sport of bowling professionally. Being from a traditional and conservative Muslim family, it wasn't easy for Sabeena to enter sports. But she got immense support from her family before and after her marriage. Indeed, she gives the credit of her success to her husband, Anwar Saleem and her children, daughter Sana (herself a professional bowler) and son Ahad.

== Professional career ==
Sabeena took to bowling in 1999 after watching her daughter Sana play the game in a local club. She became so interested in the game that she took it up professionally, putting her business of fashion designing on the back burner. Since then, she has won four National Championships in singles and one in doubles with daughter Sana. Sabeena first won the national championship in 2001 in Mumbai. Then she became the national champion again in 2003 beating D Elizabeth. She has also represented India at the Kuala Lumpur Games in 2002. She was the only Indian woman to qualify for the tourney after she scored at an average of 169.36, just higher than the 165 cut-off average for the Games. She was also the only Indian women to represent the country at the AMF World Cup 2002 in Honduras where 90 countries participated. Out of the 90 participants, she was ranked 61st in the World Cup. Sabeena has also won the National Championships in 2006 and is the current Nation Champion in India.

In late 2006, Sabeena and her daughter Sana made history of sorts after being selected for the Indian bowling team for the Asian Games in Doha. It is for the first time in the history of Indian Bowling that a mother and her daughter have made it to the Asian Games simultaneously. Mother Sabeena and daughter Sana have participated together in tournaments earlier at the Bangkok Open and the National Championships, but not at a stage as big as the Asian Games. When she started, Sabeena's bowling style was straight bowling. However, since 2001, she has been learning hooked bowling and has taken up hooked bowling full-time. She is a self-taught bowling professional.

== Career synopsis ==
- 1998 – Started her career in bowling.
- 1999 – Played her first state-level competitive tournament.
- 2000 – Participated in the National Championships for the first time.
- 2001 – Won the National Championship for the first time.
- 2002 – Represented India at the Kuala Lumpur Asiad and the AMF World Cup.
- 2003 – Won the National Championships for the second time.
- 2004 – Won the National Championships again.
- 2005 – Won the DU Bowl Championship in Chennai.
- 2006 – Won the National Championships with her daughter Sana in the doubles and along with her daughter made it to the Indian team for the Doha Asian Games.

== See also ==
- Ten-pin bowling
