= Evelyn Chan =

Singaporean bowler

Personal information
- Full name: Evelyn Chan Lu Ee
- Nationality: Singaporean

Sport
- Country: Singapore
- Sport: Bowling

Achievements and titles
- National finals: 36th Singapore International Open: Champion
Medal record
Representing Singapore
Women's Bowling
Commonwealth Tenpin Bowling Championships
Bronze medal – third place	2005 Paphos	Doubles
Southeast Asian Games
Bronze medal – third place	2005 Manila	team of five
Bronze medal – third place	2007 Bangkok	Trios

Evelyn Chan Lu Ee is a Singaporean bowler.

In 2003, Chan won the 36th Singapore International Open, her first International title.

At the 2nd Commonwealth Tenpin Bowling Championships in 2005, Chan won bronze medal at the Ladies Singles event and the gold medal with Jennifer Tan.

Chan was also part of the Singapore woman bowling team which won bronze in the Women's Team of Five at bowling at the 2005 Southeast Asian Games and Women's Trios at bowling at the 2007 Southeast Asian Games. For those accomplishments, she received the Singapore Bowling Federation's Recognition Awards in 2006 and 2007.

Chan, as part of the women's bowling team, was also awarded the Meritorious Award (Team) of the Singapore Sports Awards in 2007.
