= Siti Safiyah =

Malaysian ten-pin bowler

Medal record

Women's ten-pin bowling

Representing Malaysia

Asian Games
Gold medal – first place	2018 Jakarta-Palembang	Trios
Silver medal – second place	2018 Jakarta-Palembang	Team of Six

Siti Safiyah Amirah is a Malaysian ten-pin bowler. She finished first place at the 2009 WTBA World Ranking Masters.
