= Liza del Rosario =

Filipino bowler

Medal record
Women's Ten-pinBowling
Representing Philippines
Event	1st	2nd	3rd
World Bowling Championships	1	–	–
World Games	–	–	1
Asian Championships	2	–	–
Asian Indoor Games	–	1	–
Southeast Asian Games	1	6	2
Total	4	7	3
World Tenpin Bowling Championships
Gold medal – first place	2003 Kuala Lumpur	Trios
World Games
Bronze medal – third place	2009 Kaohsiung	Singles
AMF Bowling World Cup
Second place	2001 Thailand	Finals
Third place	2003 Singapore	Finals
Asian Championships
Gold medal – first place	2002 Hong Kong	Singles
Gold medal – first place	2002 Hong Kong	All Events
Asian Indoor and Martial Arts Games
Silver medal – second place	2017 Ashgabat	Team
Southeast Asian Games
Bronze medal – third place	2019 Manila	Team
Silver medal – second place	2007 Thailand	Mixed Doubles
Silver medal – second place	2005 Manila	Trios
Gold medal – first place	2001 Malaysia	Doubles
Silver medal – second place	2001 Malaysia	Trios
Silver medal – second place	2001 Malaysia	Team
Silver medal – second place	2001 Malaysia	Masters
Silver medal – second place	1997 Indonesia	Trios
Bronze medal – third place	1997 Indonesia	All Events
Asian Bowling Tour
Winner	Singapore Open 2004	Masters
Winner	Malaysian Open 2003	Masters
Winner	Indonesian Open 2004	Masters
Winner	Hong Kong Leg 2005	Women

Liza del Rosario is a Filipino ten-pin bowling player. She won the Trios Gold medal at the 2003 World Championships in Kuala Lumpur. It was the first gold medal for the Philippines in the world championships in 20 years. She won the Singles and All Events gold medals at the 17th Asian Championships in Hong Kong in 2002.

Del Rosario attended De La Salle University and was awarded DLSAA Lasallian Sports Achievement award in 2006 and 2008.

== World Events ==
She won the Trios Gold medal at the 2003 World Championships in Kuala Lumpur with Liza Clutario and Cecilia Yap. She placed third in Singles at the World Games in 2009 held in Kaohsiung

== Southeast Asian Games ==
She won the doubles gold medal with Arianne Cerdeña at the 21st SEA Games in Penang, Malaysia in 2001. She won the silver medal Mixed doubles with Biboy Rivera at 24th SEA Games held in Bangkok, Thailand in 2007 when the event was first introduced in the games.
