= Putty Armein =

Indonesian ten-pin bowler (born 1981)

Medal record

Women's ten-pin bowling

Representing Indonesia

Asian Games
Silver medal – second place	2006 Doha	Singles
Silver medal – second place	2010 Guangzhou	Team of Five
Bronze medal – third place	2014 Incheon	Team of Five

Putty Insavilla Armein (born 24 October 1981 in Palembang, South Sumatra) is an Indonesian ten-pin bowler. She finished in 8th position of the combined rankings at the 2006 AMF World Cup. During the final round she finished in 8th position as well. Her father name is Haji Armein Yuspar and her mother name is Irma Alfat. She won two gold and two bronze medals for Indonesia bowling national team in 2005 Southeast Asian Games in Manila.

She won two gold medals and two silver medals in Asian Bowling Cup in 2006. Additionally, she won a silver medal in the Asian Games 2006 in Doha, Qatar.
