= Shalin Zulkifli =

Malaysian ten-pin bowling player

Yang Berbahagia Datuk Shalin Zulkifli PMW JSM KMN AMN
Personal information
- Born: 28 March 1978 (age 48) London, United Kingdom

Sport
- Country: Malaysia
- Sport: Bowling

Achievements and titles
- World finals: 2001 World Tenpin Masters: Champion; 1996 AMF Bowling World Cup: 2nd Place; 1998 AMF Bowling World Cup: 3rd Place
- Regional finals: 2001 Kota Kinabalu Open: Singles Champion 2002 Thailand International Open: Masters Champion; 2002 Philippines International Open: Champion; 2002 Pre-Asian Games Storm Cup Korea Open Masters: Champion; 2003 Asian Bowling Tour Grand Slam: Champion; 2003 Asian Bowling Tour Malaysia (Philippines Leg): Champion; 2004 Bahrain Open: Champion; 2004 Sinai Open: Champion; 2004 ABF Tour (Thailand Leg): Champion; 2004 Malaysian International Open: Champion 2009 Ancol Open Bowling Championship, Jakarta: Champion
- National finals: 5-time Malaysian National Championship Champion; 4th consecutive win in 2004
Medal record
Women's Ten-pin Bowling
Representing Malaysia
Event	1st	2nd	3rd
World Bowling Championships	2	4	2
World Tenpin Team Cup	1	–	1
Asian Games	4	3	1
Asian Championships	1	3	3
Commonwealth Games	3	1	1
Southeast Asian Games	20	8	5
Total	31	19	13
World Tenpin Bowling Championships
Gold medal – first place	2017 Las Vegas	Team
Silver medal – second place	2017 Las Vegas	Doubles
Bronze medal – third place	2013 Henderson	Team
Gold medal – first place	2003 Kuala Lumpur	Team
Bronze medal – third place	1999 Abu Dhabi	Singles
Silver medal – second place	1999 Abu Dhabi	Doubles
Silver medal – second place	1999 Abu Dhabi	All Events
Silver medal – second place	1995 Reno	Trios
World Tenpin Team Cup
Bronze medal – third place	1996 Calgary	Team
Gold medal – first place	2003 Denmark	Team
Asian Games
Gold medal – first place	1994 Hiroshima	Trios
Gold medal – first place	1994 Hiroshima	All Events
Gold medal – first place	2002 Busan	Masters
Gold medal – first place	2006 Doha	Team of Five
Silver medal – second place	2006 Doha	Trios
Silver medal – second place	2014 Incheon	Doubles
Silver medal – second place	2018 Palembang	Team of Six
Bronze medal – third place	2002 Busan	Trios
Bronze medal – third place	2010 Guangzhou	Team of Five
Asian Championships
Silver medal – second place	2000 Qatar	Doubles
Bronze medal – third place	2000 Qatar	Team
Bronze medal – third place	2000 Qatar	All Events
Gold medal – first place	2008 Hong Kong	Doubles
Silver medal – second place	2008 Hong Kong	Team
Silver medal – second place	2016 Hong Kong	Team
Bronze medal – third place	2016 Hong Kong	Trios
Commonwealth Games
Silver medal – second place	Kuala Lumpur 1998	Doubles
Gold medal – first place	Cyprus 2005	Masters
Gold medal – first place	Cyprus 2005	Mixed Doubles
Gold medal – first place	Cyprus 2005	Team
Bronze medal – third place	Cyprus 2005	Team
Southeast Asian Games
Gold medal – first place	Singapore 1994	Trios
Gold medal – first place	Singapore 1994	Team
Silver medal – second place	Singapore 1994	Doubles
Silver medal – second place	Singapore 1994	Masters
Silver medal – second place	Chiang Mai 1995	Trios
Silver medal – second place	Chiang Mai 1995	Team
Gold medal – first place	Jakarta 1997	Doubles
Gold medal – first place	Jakarta 1997	Trios
Silver medal – second place	Jakarta 1997	All Events
Silver medal – second place	Jakarta 1997	Masters
Gold medal – first place	Brunei 1999	Doubles
Gold medal – first place	Brunei 1999	Trios
Gold medal – first place	Brunei 1999	Team
Gold medal – first place	Brunei 1999	All Events
Gold medal – first place	Brunei 1999	Masters
Bronze medal – third place	Brunei 1999	Singles
Gold medal – first place	Malaysia 2001	Singles
Gold medal – first place	Malaysia 2001	Trios
Gold medal – first place	Malaysia 2001	Team
Gold medal – first place	Malaysia 2001	All Events
Gold medal – first place	Thailand 2007	Trios
Gold medal – first place	Thailand 2007	Team
Gold medal – first place	Thailand 2007	Mixed Doubles
Bronze medal – third place	Thailand 2007	Singles
Bronze medal – third place	Thailand 2007	Doubles
Gold medal – first place	Singapore 2015	Team
Bronze medal – third place	Singapore 2015	Doubles
Gold medal – first place	Malaysia 2017	Trios
Gold medal – first place	Malaysia 2017	Team
Gold medal – first place	Malaysia 2017	Masters
Silver medal – second place	Malaysia 2017	Mixed Doubles
Bronze medal – third place	Malaysia 2017	Mixed Singles
Silver medal – second place	Manila 2019	Mixed Team

Datuk Shalin binti Zulkifli (born 28 March 1978 in Islington, London, United Kingdom) is a Malaysian professional tenpin bowler. She has played and won various national and international tournaments, and has at various points in her career ranked No. 1 of the professional tenpin bowlers in Malaysia and Asia.

== Career ==
Before Shalin Zulkifli competed in the final match of the 2001 World Tenpin Masters, she achieved victories over Marek Charezinski from Poland in the first round, followed by Chris Van Damme from Belgium in the quarter-finals, and Paeng Nepomuceno from the Philippines in the semi-finals. And most importantly, in her final appearance, Zulkifli triumphed over Tore Torgersen from Norway, concluding the match with a final aggregate score of 455-450. This victory marks her significant achievement as the 2001 World Tenpin Masters champion on March 11th, 2001. In 2004, she was inducted into the International Bowling Hall of Fame. Bowling in the United States of America, she was a quarterfinalist at the 2008 US Women's Open, and competed in the 2008-09 PBA Women's Series. In Southeast Asian Games, she is the most successful bowling athlete with a record of 20 gold medals being achieved.

Shalin was born in North Islington and spent her childhood in Kuala Lumpur, Malaysia. She began bowling at the age of 9 and joined the national bowling team in the late 1980s. In 1991, she was named Selangor’s Most Promising Sportsgirl of the Year, and in 1994, she became the youngest player and first Malaysian to win the Ladies Open of the Kent Malaysian All-Stars. In 1997, she became the first woman to bowl a 300 in the AMF Bowling World Cup.

Shalin holds a degree in Sports Science that specializes in Sports Psychology and Coaching. She currently heads the Malaysian Athlete Career and Education Secretariat at the National Sports Council of Malaysia. She used to run a bowling center at The Curve, a shopping mall located in Mutiara Damansara.

In 2021, Shalin has retired from the national team, ended her 28-year-long international bowling career.

== Achievements ==
- Malaysian Sportswoman Award (1997, 1996, 1994, 2001, and 2002)
- Malaysian National Champion (1996, 2001, 2002, and 2003)
- Malaysian Olympian Award (1994 and 1999)
- Asian No. 1 Rank (2000, 2001, 2002, and 2004)
- International Bowler of the Year (2002)
- International Bowling Hall of Fame Inductee (2004)
- Kent Malaysian All-Stars - Ladies Open Champion

1993

- Gold, Women's Trios, SEA Games 1993, Singapore
- Gold, Women's Team of 5, SEA Games 1993, Singapore
- Silver, Women's Doubles, SEA Games 1993, Singapore
- Silver, Women's Masters, SEA Games 1993, Singapore

1994

- Gold, Women's Trios, Asian Games, Hiroshima, Japan
- Gold, Women's All Events, Asian Games, Hiroshima, Japan

1995

- Silver, Women's Trios, SEA Games 1995, Chiang Mai, Thailand
- Silver, Women's Team, SEA Games 1995, Chiang Mai, Thailand

1996

- World Tenpin Team Cup (Calgary, Canada) - Bronze & Voted MVP
- AMF World Cup 1996 (Belfast, Northern Ireland) - 2nd place
- World Youth Championship - Bronze - Girl's Doubles

1997

- Gold, Women's Doubles, SEA Games 1997, Jakarta, Indonesia
- Gold, Women's Trios, SEA Games 1997, Jakarta, Indonesia
- Bronze, Women's Team of 5, SEA Games 1997, Jakarta, Indonesia
- Silver, Women's All Events, SEA Games 1997, Jakarta, Indonesia
- Silver, Women's Masters, SEA Games 1997, Jakarta, Indonesia

1998

- AMF World Cup 1998 (Kobe, Japan) - Record for qualifying for 3 consecutive stepladder final appearances; overall 3rd place
- Silver, Women's Doubles, Commonwealth Games, Kuala Lumpur, Malaysia
- Gold, Girl's Singles, World Youth Championship, Incheon, South Korea
- Bronze, Girl's Doubles, World Youth Championship, Incheon, South Korea
- Bronze, Girl's Team of Five, World Youth Championship, Incheon, South Korea
- Gold medal, Girl's All Events, World Youth Championship, Incheon, South Korea

1999

- Asian Youth (Singapore)
  - Doubles Gold Medal Champion
  - Team Gold Medal Champion
- SEA Games 1999 (Bandar Seri Begawan, Brunei)
  - Doubles Gold Medal Champion
  - Trios Gold Medal Champion
  - Team Gold Medal Champion
  - All Events Gold Medal Champion
  - Masters Gold Medal Champion
  - Singles Bronze Medal Champion

2000

- Silver, Girl's All Events, World Youth Championship, Santo Domingo, Dominican Republic
- Silver, Women's Doubles, Asian Championship, Doha, Qatar
- Bronze, Women's Team of Five, Asian Championship, Doha, Qatar
- Bronze, Women's All Events, Asian Championship, Doha, Qatar
- Top 8, AMF World Cup 2000, Lisbon, Portugal
- 1st runner-up, Thailand International Open

2001

- World Tenpin Masters 2001 (Dagenham, United Kingdom) - For successfully beating Tore Torgersen of Norway - scored by 455-450 in the championship match
- SEA Games 2001 (Kuala Lumpur, Malaysia)
  - Singles Gold Medal Champion
  - All-Events Gold Medal Champion
  - Trios Gold Medal Champion
  - Team Gold Medal Champion
  - Set 8 Sea Games Records
- Kota Kinabalu Open - Singles Champion

2002

- Thailand International Open - Women's Open Masters Champion
- Philippines International Open - Women's Champion
- Pre-Asian Games Storm Cup Korea Open Masters - Women's Champion
- Bronze, Women's Trios, Asian Games, Busan, South Korea
- Gold, Women's Masters, Asian Games, Busan, South Korea

2003

- World Tenpin Team Cup (Odense, Denmark) - Women's Team Gold Medal Champion
- World Championships (Kuala Lumpur, Malaysia) - Women's Team of Six Gold Medal Champion
- Santa Claus Open - 2nd place
- Asian Bowling Tour Grand Slam - Women's Champion
- Beating the men’s champion Purvis Granger of the Philippines 226-225 to win the ESPN Champion’s Challenge trophy.
- Asian Bowling Tour Malaysia (Philippines Leg) - Women's Champion

2004

- Bahrain Open - Ladies Open Champion
- Sinai Open - Women's Champion
- ABF Tour (Thailand Leg) - Women's Champion
- Malaysian International Open - Women's Champion

2005

- 2nd Commonwealth Bowling Championship (Cyprus)
  - Masters Gold Medal Champion
  - Mixed Doubles Gold Medal Champion
  - Team Gold Medal Champion
  - Singles Bronze Medal Champion
- Malaysian National Championship - Ladies Open Champion (4th consecutive win & 5th in her career)

2006

- Silver, Women's Trios, Asian Games 2006, Doha, Qatar
- Gold, Women's Team of 5, Asian Games 2006, Doha, Qatar

2007

- Bronze, Women's Singles, SEA Games 2007, Nakhon Ratchasima, Thailand
- Bronze, Women's Doubles, SEA Games 2007, Nakhon Ratchasima, Thailand
- Gold, Women's Trios, SEA Games 2007, Nakhon Ratchasima, Thailand
- Gold, Women's Team of Five, SEA Games 2007, Nakhon Ratchasima, Thailand
- Gold, Mixed Doubles, SEA Games 2007, Nakhon Ratchasima, Thailand
- Gold, Women's Team of Six, World Women Championship, Monterrey, Mexico

2008

- Gold, Women's Doubles, Asian Championship, Hong Kong, China
- Silver, Women's Team of Five, Asian Championship, Hong Kong, China

2009

- 3rd Singapore International Open, Singapore
- Women Champion 2nd Ancol Open Bowling Championship, Jakarta, Indonesia

2010

- Bronze medal, Women's Team of Six, Asian Games, Guangzhou, China
- 4th place, 12th Sinai International Open Bowling Championship, Cairo, Egypt
- Women's Open Champion, Hong Kong International Open, Hong Kong, China

2012

- 2nd place, Women's Division, Indonesia International Open, Jakarta, Indonesia
- 2nd place, Women's Division, Kuala Lumpur International Open, Kuala Lumpur, Malaysia

2013

- 2nd place, Women's Division, Singapore International Open, Singapore
- Bronze, Team of 6, World Championship, Las Vegas, NV, USA

2014

- Silver, Women's Doubles, Asian Games, Incheon, South Korea

2015

- 6th place, 41st MWA Singha Thailand International Open, Bangkok, Thailand
- Gold, Women's Team of Six, SEA Games 2015, Singapore
- Bronze, Women's Doubles, SEA Games 2015, Singapore

2016

- Bronze, Women's Trios, A6, Asian Championship, Hong Kong, China
- 2nd place, Women's Open, Indonesia International Open, Jakarta, Indonesia

2017

- Bronze, Women's Singles, SEA Games 2017, Kuala Lumpur, Malaysia
- Silver, Mixed Doubles, SEA Games 2017, Kuala Lumpur, Malaysia
- Gold, Women's Trios, SEA Games 2017, Kuala Lumpur, Malaysia
- Gold, Women's Team of 5, SEA Games 2017, Kuala Lumpur, Malaysia
- Gold, Women's Masters, SEA Games 2017, Kuala Lumpur, Malaysia
- Gold, Women's Team of Six, World Championship, Las Vegas, NV, USA
- Silver, Women's Doubles, World Championship, Las Vegas, NV, USA

2018

- Silver, Women's Team of Six, Asian Games, Palembang, Indonesia

2019

- Silver, Women's Team of Four, SEA Games 2019, Manila, Philippines

== Honors ==
=== Honors of Malaysia ===
- Malaysia
  - Member of the Order of the Defender of the Realm (AMN) (1995)
  - Officer of the Order of the Defender of the Realm (KMN) (2001)
  - Companion of the Order of Loyalty to the Crown of Malaysia (JSM) (2021)
- Federal Territory (Malaysia)
  - Commander of the Order of the Territorial Crown (PMW) – Datuk (2023)

== In popular culture ==
From 2020 and 2022, Shalin involved as an advisor technical with her protégé Syaidatul Afifah acting as Sandra for TV Malay drama called Ratu Ten Pin (Queen of Tenpin) Season 1-2 aired by Astro Ria.

In Season 2, character Shalin, carried by Jasmine Suraya Chin, Jasmine tell about how style play, routine, and learn story from Shalin also keeping short hair.
