= Sepak takraw at the 2014 Asian Games =

- Venue: Bucheon Gymnasium
- Dates: 20 September – 3 October 2014
- Competitors: 210 from 13 nations

Sepak takraw at the 2014 Asian Games in Incheon was held from 20 September 2014 to 3 October 2014 at the Bucheon Gymnasium.

== Schedule ==
P	Preliminary round	½	Semifinals	F	Final

Event↓/Date →	20th Sat	21st Sun		22nd Mon	23rd Tue	24th Wed	25th Thu	26th Fri	27th Sat	28th Sun	29th Mon	30th Tue	1st Wed	2nd Thu	3rd Fri
Men's doubles	P	P	½	F											
Men's regu											P	P	P	½	F
Men's team regu					P	P	P	½		F					
Women's doubles	P	P	½	F											
Women's regu											P	P	P	½	F
Women's team regu					P	P	P		½	F					

== Medalists ==
=== Men ===
Event	Gold	Silver	Bronze
Doubles	Myanmar; Zaw Zaw Aung; Zaw Latt; Wai Lin Aung	South Korea; Kim Young-man; Im An-soo; Jeong Won-deok	Singapore; Farhan Amran; Eddy Nor Shafiq Sahari; Hafiz Nor Izam Jaafar
Doubles	Myanmar; Zaw Zaw Aung; Zaw Latt; Wai Lin Aung	South Korea; Kim Young-man; Im An-soo; Jeong Won-deok	Japan; Susumu Teramoto; Seiya Takano; Takeshi Terashima
Regu	Thailand; Anuwat Chaichana; Siriwat Sakha; Pornchai Kaokaew; Pattarapong Yupadee; Sittipong Khamchan	South Korea; Park Hyeon-geun; Shim Jae-chul; Kim Young-man; Im An-soo; Jeong Won-deok	Malaysia; Ahmad Aizat Nor Azmi; Syazreenqamar Salehan; Fadzli Roslan; Zamree Dahan; Syahir Rosdi
Regu	Thailand; Anuwat Chaichana; Siriwat Sakha; Pornchai Kaokaew; Pattarapong Yupadee; Sittipong Khamchan	South Korea; Park Hyeon-geun; Shim Jae-chul; Kim Young-man; Im An-soo; Jeong Won-deok	Myanmar; Htoo Aung Kyaw; Zaw Zaw Aung; Naing Lin Aung; Aung Pyae Tun; Kyaw Soe Win
Team regu	Thailand; Anuwat Chaichana; Siriwat Sakha; Kritsana Tanakorn; Assadin Wongyota; Pornchai Kaokaew; Sahachat Sakhoncharoen; Pattarapong Yupadee; Thanawat Chumsena; Somporn Jaisinghol; Suriyan Peachan; Supachai Maneenat; Sittipong Khamchan	South Korea; Park Hyeon-geun; Woo Gyeong-han; Jeon Young-man; Kim Hyun-jun; Shim Jae-chul; Kim Young-man; Go Jae-uk; Sin Seung-tae; Im An-soo; Shin Choo-kwang; Jeong Won-deok; Hong Seung-hyun	Malaysia; Ahmad Aizat Nor Azmi; Izurin Refin; Syazreenqamar Salehan; Mohd Helmi Ismail; Fadzli Roslan; Kamal Alfiza Shafie; Amirul Zazwan Amir; Muqlis Borhan; Zuleffendi Sumari; Zamree Dahan; Syahir Rosdi; Idham Sulaiman
Team regu	Thailand; Anuwat Chaichana; Siriwat Sakha; Kritsana Tanakorn; Assadin Wongyota; Pornchai Kaokaew; Sahachat Sakhoncharoen; Pattarapong Yupadee; Thanawat Chumsena; Somporn Jaisinghol; Suriyan Peachan; Supachai Maneenat; Sittipong Khamchan	South Korea; Park Hyeon-geun; Woo Gyeong-han; Jeon Young-man; Kim Hyun-jun; Shim Jae-chul; Kim Young-man; Go Jae-uk; Sin Seung-tae; Im An-soo; Shin Choo-kwang; Jeong Won-deok; Hong Seung-hyun	Indonesia; Syamsul Hadi; Syamsul Akmal; Yovi Hendra Utama; Muhammad Ruswan Wajib; Andi Paturay; Firmansyah; Saiful Rijal; Husni Uba; Nofrizal; Hendra Pago; Abrian Sihab Aldilatama; Victoria Eka Prasetyo

=== Women ===
Event	Gold	Silver	Bronze
Doubles	Myanmar; Kyu Kyu Thin; Khin Hnin Wai; Phyu Phyu Than	Laos; Nouandam Volabouth; Koy Xayavong; Sonsavan Keosouliya	Vietnam; Nguyễn Thị Quyên; Lê Thị Tâm; Dương Thị Xuyên
Doubles	Myanmar; Kyu Kyu Thin; Khin Hnin Wai; Phyu Phyu Than	Laos; Nouandam Volabouth; Koy Xayavong; Sonsavan Keosouliya	Japan; Yukie Sato; Sawa Aoki; Chiharu Yano
Regu	Thailand; Masaya Duangsri; Sunthari Rupsung; Fueangfa Praphatsarang; Wanwisa Jankaen; Payom Srihongsa	South Korea; Park Seon-ju; Kim I-seul; Lee Min-ju; Lee Jin-hee; Sim Su-yeon	China; Lao Tianxue; Zhang Yanan; Liu Xiaofang; Song Cheng; Cui Yonghui
Regu	Thailand; Masaya Duangsri; Sunthari Rupsung; Fueangfa Praphatsarang; Wanwisa Jankaen; Payom Srihongsa	South Korea; Park Seon-ju; Kim I-seul; Lee Min-ju; Lee Jin-hee; Sim Su-yeon	Indonesia; Leni; Florensia Cristy; Lena; Rike Media Sari; Dini Mita Sari
Team regu	Thailand; Masaya Duangsri; Sunthari Rupsung; Rungtip Tanaking; Kaewjai Pumsawangkaew; Priyapat Saton; Wiphada Chitphuan; Fueangfa Praphatsarang; Sasiwimol Janthasit; Wanwisa Jankaen; Somruedee Pruepruk; Payom Srihongsa; Nattiya Chantavet	Myanmar; Ei Thin Zar; Nant Yin Yin Myint; Kyu Kyu Thin; Khin Hnin Wai; Htut Kay Zin; Phyu Phyu Than; Thin Zar Soe Nyunt; Nan Su Myat San; Nwe Nwe Htwe	Indonesia; Irma Wati; Leni; Widya Andrini Modjundju; Jumasiah; Florensia Cristy; Lena; Rike Media Sari; Nur Isni Chikita Sumito; Kusnelia; Dini Mita Sari; Hasmawati Umar
Team regu	Thailand; Masaya Duangsri; Sunthari Rupsung; Rungtip Tanaking; Kaewjai Pumsawangkaew; Priyapat Saton; Wiphada Chitphuan; Fueangfa Praphatsarang; Sasiwimol Janthasit; Wanwisa Jankaen; Somruedee Pruepruk; Payom Srihongsa; Nattiya Chantavet	Myanmar; Ei Thin Zar; Nant Yin Yin Myint; Kyu Kyu Thin; Khin Hnin Wai; Htut Kay Zin; Phyu Phyu Than; Thin Zar Soe Nyunt; Nan Su Myat San; Nwe Nwe Htwe	Vietnam; Nguyễn Thị Quyên; Cao Thị Hải Yến; Lê Thị Tâm; Trần Thị Thùy Linh; Cao Thị Yến; Nguyễn Thị Bích Thủy; Dương Thị Xuyên; Nguyễn Thị Hòa; Bùi Thị Hải Yến; Nguyễn Bạch Vân; Trần Thị Thu Hoài

== Medal table ==
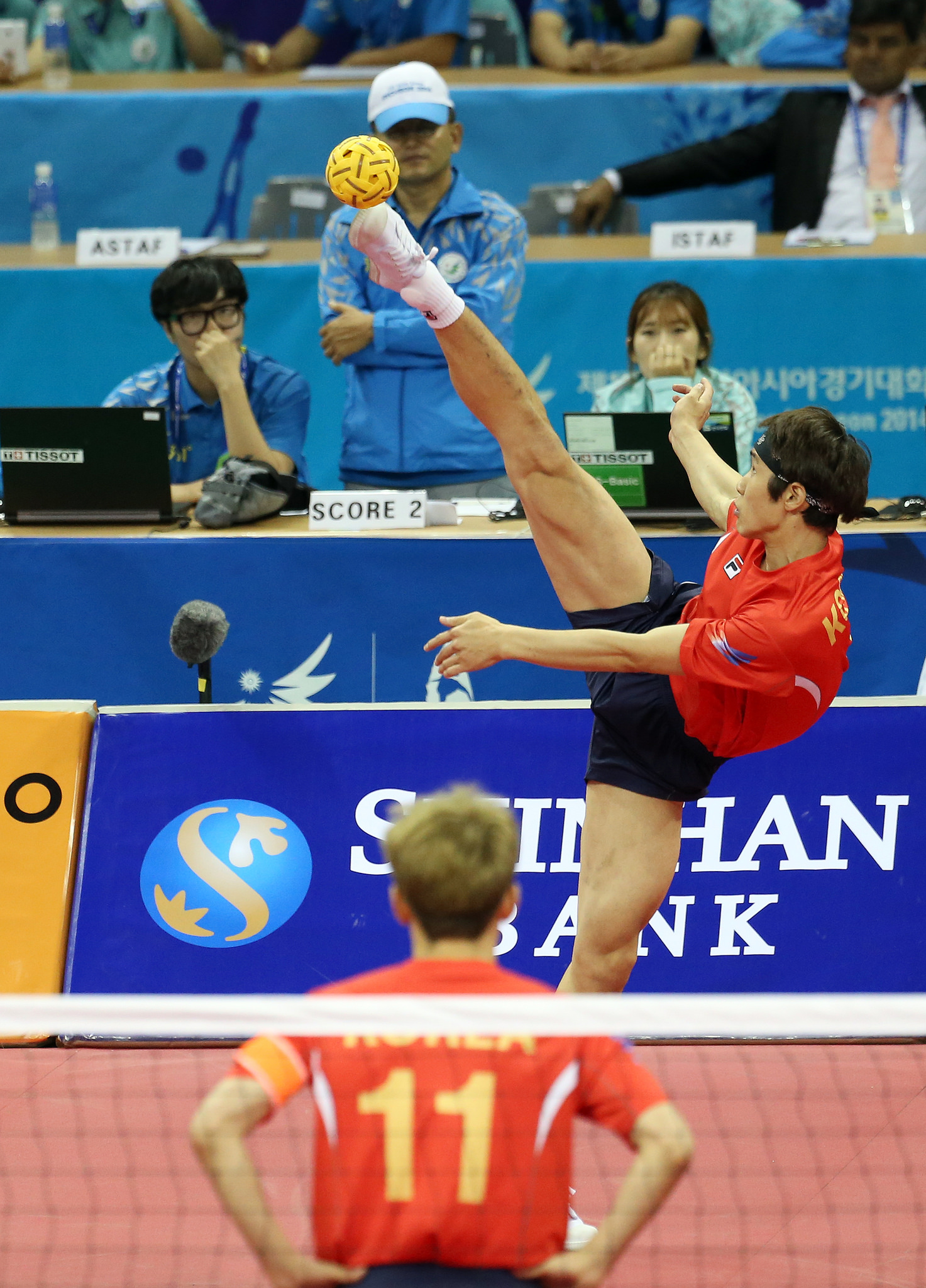
South Korea team

Rank	Nation	Gold	Silver	Bronze	Total
1	Thailand (THA)	4	0	0	4
2	Myanmar (MYA)	2	1	1	4
3	South Korea (KOR)	0	4	0	4
4	Laos (LAO)	0	1	0	1
5	Indonesia (INA)	0	0	3	3
6	Japan (JPN)	0	0	2	2
6	Malaysia (MAS)	0	0	2	2
6	Vietnam (VIE)	0	0	2	2
9	China (CHN)	0	0	1	1
9	Singapore (SIN)	0	0	1	1
Totals (10 entries)		6	6	12	24

== Participating nations ==
A total of 210 athletes from 13 nations competed in sepak takraw at the 2014 Asian Games:

- Brunei (7)
- China (25)
- India (24)
- Indonesia (23)
- Japan (17)
- Laos (10)
- Malaysia (20)
- Myanmar (16)
- Nepal (4)
- Singapore (5)
- South Korea (24)
- Thailand (24)
- Vietnam (11)
