= Sepak takraw at the 2014 Asian Games – Men's regu =

Men's regu at the 2014 Asian Games
- Venue: Bucheon Gymnasium
- Date: 29 September – 3 October 2014
- Competitors: 48 from 10 nations

Medalists
gold medal	Thailand
silver medal	South Korea
bronze medal	Malaysia
bronze medal	Myanmar

The men's regu sepak takraw competition at the 2014 Asian Games in Incheon was held from 29 September to 3 October at the Bucheon Gymnasium.

== Squads ==
Brunei	China	India	Laos
Hafizuddin Jamaluddin; Nur Alimin Sungoh; Mohd Shukri Jaineh; Marzuki Munap; Ismail Ang	Li Pengfei; Ge Yusheng; Jin Jie; Kang Xinyu; Li Huanhuan	Gurumayum Jiteshor Sharma; Akash Yumnam; Niken Singh Khangembam; Jotin Singh Ngathem; Nanao Singh Moirangthem	Vanhkham Sonmani; Yothin Sombatphouthone; Daovy Sanavongxay; Sengvanh Boulommavong; Noum Souvannalith
Malaysia	Myanmar	Nepal	Singapore
Ahmad Aizat Nor Azmi; Syazreenqamar Salehan; Fadzli Roslan; Zamree Dahan; Syahir Rosdi	Htoo Aung Kyaw; Zaw Zaw Aung; Naing Lin Aung; Aung Pyae Tun; Kyaw Soe Win	Alen Gurung; Aman Pode; Anil Gurung	Farhan Amran; Danial Feriza Padzli; Magrib Ibrahim; Eddy Nor Shafiq Sahari; Hafiz Nor Izam Jaafar
South Korea	Thailand		
Park Hyeon-geun; Shim Jae-chul; Kim Young-man; Im An-soo; Jeong Won-deok	Anuwat Chaichana; Siriwat Sakha; Pornchai Kaokaew; Pattarapong Yupadee; Sittipong Khamchan		

== Results ==
All times are Korea Standard Time (UTC+09:00)

=== Preliminary ===
==== Group A ====
Pos	Team	Pld	W	L	SF	SA	SD	Pts	Qualification
1	Thailand	4	4	0	8	0	+8	8	Semifinals
2	Myanmar	4	3	1	6	4	+2	6	Semifinals
3	Laos	4	2	2	4	4	0	4	
4	Singapore	4	1	3	3	7	−4	2	
5	China	4	0	4	2	8	−6	0	

Source: Official website

Date	Time		Score		Set 1	Set 2	Set 3
29 Sep	09:00	Singapore	0–2	Laos	20–22	15–21	
29 Sep	09:00	China	1–2	Myanmar	21–8	14–21	19–21
29 Sep	14:00	Thailand	2–0	Laos	21–11	21–13	
29 Sep	14:00	Singapore	2–1	China	6–21	21–16	21–19
30 Sep	09:00	China	0–2	Laos	19–21	8–21	
30 Sep	09:00	Thailand	2–0	Myanmar	21–13	21–10	
30 Sep	14:00	Thailand	2–0	China	21–16	21–4	
30 Sep	14:00	Singapore	1–2	Myanmar	15–21	21–19	17–21
01 Oct	09:00	Myanmar	2–0	Laos	21–15	22–20	
01 Oct	09:00	Thailand	2–0	Singapore	21–8	21–7	

==== Group B ====
Pos	Team	Pld	W	L	SF	SA	SD	Pts	Qualification
1	South Korea	4	4	0	8	1	+7	8	Semifinals
2	Malaysia	4	3	1	7	2	+5	6	Semifinals
3	India	4	2	2	4	4	0	4	
4	Brunei	4	1	3	2	6	−4	2	
5	Nepal	4	0	4	0	8	−8	0	

Source: Official website

Date	Time		Score		Set 1	Set 2	Set 3
29 Sep	11:00	Nepal	0–2	South Korea	Walkover		
29 Sep	11:00	India	2–0	Brunei	21–12	21–15	
29 Sep	16:00	Nepal	0–2	India	Walkover		
29 Sep	16:00	Malaysia	1–2	South Korea	21–14	16–21	10–21
30 Sep	11:00	Malaysia	2–0	Brunei	21–18	21–10	
30 Sep	11:00	India	0–2	South Korea	13–21	6–21	
30 Sep	16:00	Nepal	0–2	Brunei	Walkover		
30 Sep	16:00	Malaysia	2–0	India	24–22	21–18	
01 Oct	11:00	Malaysia	2–0	Nepal	Walkover		
01 Oct	11:00	Brunei	0–2	South Korea	16–21	15–21	

=== Knockout round ===
Semifinals
2 October
Thailand	2
Malaysia	0
2 October
South Korea	2
Myanmar	1

Gold medal match
3 October
Thailand	2
South Korea	0

==== Semifinals ====
Date	Time		Score		Set 1	Set 2	Set 3
02 Oct	09:00	Thailand	2–0	Malaysia	21–9	21–8	
02 Oct	11:00	South Korea	2–1	Myanmar	21–11	17–21	21–16

==== Gold medal match ====
Date	Time		Score		Set 1	Set 2	Set 3
03 Oct	11:30	Thailand	2–0	South Korea	21–16	21–14	
