= Sepak takraw at the 2014 Asian Games – Women's team regu =

Women's team regu at the 2014 Asian Games
- Venue: Bucheon Gymnasium
- Date: 23–28 September 2014
- Competitors: 79 from 7 nations

Medalists
| gold medal | Thailand |
| silver medal | Myanmar |
| bronze medal | Indonesia |
| bronze medal | Vietnam |

The women's team sepak takraw competition at the 2014 Asian Games in Incheon was held from 23 September to 28 September at the Bucheon Gymnasium.

== Squads ==
| China | India | Indonesia | Myanmar |
|---|---|---|---|
| Xu Jinling; Gu Xihui; Lao Tianxue; Zhai Heyang; Zhang Yanan; Liu Xiaofang; Wang Qiyue; Song Cheng; Cui Yonghui; Cao Xulian; Cui Yongyan; Geng Xuekai | Maipak Devi Ayekpam; Jimi Devi Okram; Omita Devi Khangenbam; Lairikyengbam Thoinu Chanu; Priya Devi Khaidem; Keneileno Nakhro; Khangembam Bijata Chanu; Pangambam Linthoingambi Chanu; Navatha Ralla; Chaoba Devi Oinam; Manisha Kumari; Dolly Srivastava | Irma Wati; Leni; Widya Andrini Modjundju; Jumasiah; Florensia Cristy; Lena; Rike Media Sari; Nur Isni Chikita Sumito; Kusnelia; Dini Mita Sari; Hasmawati Umar | Ei Thin Zar; Nant Yin Yin Myint; Kyu Kyu Thin; Khin Hnin Wai; Htut Kay Zin; Phyu Phyu Than; Thin Zar Soe Nyunt; Nan Su Myat San; Nwe Nwe Htwe |
| South Korea | Thailand | Vietnam | |
| Park Seon-ju; Kim I-seul; Bae Han-oul; Kim Dong-hee; Song Mi-jeong; Lee Min-ju; Lee Jin-hee; Sim Su-yeon; Kim Min-jung; Choi Ji-na; Um Mi-sun; Been Won-yeong | Masaya Duangsri; Sunthari Rupsung; Rungtip Tanaking; Kaewjai Pumsawangkaew; Priyapat Saton; Wiphada Chitphuan; Fueangfa Praphatsarang; Sasiwimol Janthasit; Wanwisa Jankaen; Somruedee Pruepruk; Payom Srihongsa; Nattiya Chantavet | Nguyễn Thị Quyên; Cao Thị Hải Yến; Lê Thị Tâm; Trần Thị Thùy Linh; Cao Thị Yến; Nguyễn Thị Bích Thủy; Dương Thị Xuyên; Nguyễn Thị Hòa; Bùi Thị Hải Yến; Nguyễn Bạch Vân; Trần Thị Thu Hoài | |

== Results ==
All times are Korea Standard Time (UTC+09:00)

=== Preliminary ===
==== Group A ====
| Pos | Team | Pld | W | L | MF | MA | MD | Pts | Qualification |
|---|---|---|---|---|---|---|---|---|---|
| 1 | Indonesia | 2 | 2 | 0 | 4 | 2 | +2 | 4 | Semifinals |
| 2 | Vietnam | 2 | 1 | 1 | 4 | 2 | +2 | 2 | Semifinals |
| 3 | China | 2 | 0 | 2 | 1 | 5 | −4 | 0 | |

Source: Official website

| Date | Time | | Score | | Regu 1 | | | Regu 2 | | | Regu 3 | | |
| Date | Time | | Score | | Set 1 | Set 2 | Set 3 | Set 1 | Set 2 | Set 3 | Set 1 | Set 2 | Set 3 |
|---|---|---|---|---|---|---|---|---|---|---|---|---|---|
| 23 Sep | 14:30 | Vietnam | 1–2 | Indonesia | 0–2 | | | 0–2 | | | 2–0 | | |
| 23 Sep | 14:30 | Vietnam | 1–2 | Indonesia | 19–21 | 19–21 | | 19–21 | 17–21 | | 22–20 | 21–16 | |
| 24 Sep | 14:30 | China | 1–2 | Indonesia | 0–2 | | | 0–2 | | | 2–0 | | |
| 24 Sep | 14:30 | China | 1–2 | Indonesia | 11–21 | 14–21 | | 9–21 | 13–21 | | 21–12 | 21–15 | |
| 25 Sep | 14:30 | China | 0–3 | Vietnam | 1–2 | | | 0–2 | | | 0–2 | | |
| 25 Sep | 14:30 | China | 0–3 | Vietnam | 21–6 | 13–21 | 12–21 | 7–21 | 9–21 | | 13–21 | 15–21 | |

==== Group B ====
| Pos | Team | Pld | W | L | MF | MA | MD | Pts | Qualification |
|---|---|---|---|---|---|---|---|---|---|
| 1 | Thailand | 3 | 3 | 0 | 9 | 0 | +9 | 6 | Semifinals |
| 2 | Myanmar | 3 | 2 | 1 | 5 | 4 | +1 | 4 | Semifinals |
| 3 | South Korea | 3 | 1 | 2 | 4 | 5 | −1 | 2 | |
| 4 | India | 3 | 0 | 3 | 0 | 9 | −9 | 0 | |

Source: Official website

| Date | Time | | Score | | Regu 1 | | | Regu 2 | | | Regu 3 | | |
| Date | Time | | Score | | Set 1 | Set 2 | Set 3 | Set 1 | Set 2 | Set 3 | Set 1 | Set 2 | Set 3 |
|---|---|---|---|---|---|---|---|---|---|---|---|---|---|
| 23 Sep | 14:30 | Myanmar | 3–0 | India | 2–1 | | | 2–0 | | | 2–0 | | |
| 23 Sep | 14:30 | Myanmar | 3–0 | India | 20–22 | 21–19 | 21–11 | 21–4 | 21–3 | | 21–8 | 21–11 | |
| 23 Sep | 14:30 | Thailand | 3–0 | South Korea | 2–0 | | | 2–1 | | | 2–0 | | |
| 23 Sep | 14:30 | Thailand | 3–0 | South Korea | 21–9 | 21–15 | | 24–22 | 18–21 | 21–12 | 21–2 | 21–4 | |
| 24 Sep | 14:30 | Thailand | 3–0 | India | 2–0 | | | 2–0 | | | 2–0 | | |
| 24 Sep | 14:30 | Thailand | 3–0 | India | 21–7 | 21–7 | | 21–4 | 21–14 | | 21–6 | 21–6 | |
| 24 Sep | 14:30 | Myanmar | 2–1 | South Korea | 0–2 | | | 2–1 | | | 2–0 | | |
| 24 Sep | 14:30 | Myanmar | 2–1 | South Korea | 20–22 | 16–21 | | 21–13 | 17–21 | 21–18 | 21–15 | 21–11 | |
| 25 Sep | 14:30 | India | 0–3 | South Korea | 0–2 | | | 0–2 | | | 0–2 | | |
| 25 Sep | 14:30 | India | 0–3 | South Korea | 8–21 | 16–21 | | 18–21 | 16–21 | | 13–21 | 7–21 | |
| 25 Sep | 14:30 | Thailand | 3–0 | Myanmar | 2–0 | | | 2–0 | | | 2–0 | | |
| 25 Sep | 14:30 | Thailand | 3–0 | Myanmar | 21–13 | 21–17 | | 21–7 | 21–10 | | 21–14 | 21–11 | |

=== Knockout round ===
Semifinals
27 September
Indonesia | 1
Myanmar | 2
27 September
Thailand | 2
Vietnam | 0

Gold medal match
28 September
Myanmar | 0
Thailand | 2

==== Semifinals ====
| Date | Time | | Score | | Regu 1 | | | Regu 2 | | | Regu 3 | | |
| Date | Time | | Score | | Set 1 | Set 2 | Set 3 | Set 1 | Set 2 | Set 3 | Set 1 | Set 2 | Set 3 |
|---|---|---|---|---|---|---|---|---|---|---|---|---|---|
| 27 Sep | 09:00 | Indonesia | 1–2 | Myanmar | 2–0 | | | 1–2 | | | 1–2 | | |
| 27 Sep | 09:00 | Indonesia | 1–2 | Myanmar | 21–19 | 21–18 | | 21–13 | 15–21 | 12–21 | 11–21 | 21–19 | 14–21 |
| 27 Sep | 14:30 | Thailand | 2–0 | Vietnam | 2–1 | | | 2–0 | | | | | |
| 27 Sep | 14:30 | Thailand | 2–0 | Vietnam | 21–15 | 19–21 | 21–6 | 21–14 | 21–8 | | | | |

==== Gold medal match ====
| Date | Time | | Score | | Regu 1 | | | Regu 2 | | | Regu 3 | | |
| Date | Time | | Score | | Set 1 | Set 2 | Set 3 | Set 1 | Set 2 | Set 3 | Set 1 | Set 2 | Set 3 |
|---|---|---|---|---|---|---|---|---|---|---|---|---|---|
| 28 Sep | 09:30 | Myanmar | 0–2 | Thailand | 1–2 | | | 0–2 | | | | | |
| 28 Sep | 09:30 | Myanmar | 0–2 | Thailand | 11–21 | 21–11 | 16–21 | 9–21 | 13–21 | | | | |
