= Sepak takraw at the 2014 Asian Games – Men's doubles =

Men's doubles at the 2014 Asian Games
- Venue: Bucheon Gymnasium
- Date: 20–22 September 2014
- Competitors: 24 from 8 nations

Medalists
gold medal	Myanmar
silver medal	South Korea
bronze medal	Singapore
bronze medal	Japan

The men's double regu sepak takraw competition at the 2014 Asian Games in Incheon was held from 20 September to 22 September at the Bucheon Gymnasium.

== Squads ==
Brunei	Indonesia	Japan	Laos
Abdul Hadi Ariffin Matali; Ismail Ang; Jamaluddin Hj Marzi	Syamsul Hadi; Saiful Rijal; Nofrizal	Susumu Teramoto; Seiya Takano; Takeshi Terashima	Vanhkham Sonmani; Daovy Sanavongxay; Noum Souvannalith
Myanmar	Nepal	Singapore	South Korea
Zaw Zaw Aung; Zaw Latt; Wai Lin Aung	Aman Pode; Rupesh Sunar; Anil Gurung	Farhan Amran; Eddy Nor Shafiq Sahari; Hafiz Nor Izam Jaafar	Kim Young-man; Im An-soo; Jeong Won-deok

== Results ==
All times are Korea Standard Time (UTC+09:00)

=== Preliminary ===
==== Group A ====
Pos	Team	Pld	W	L	SF	SA	SD	Pts	Qualification
1	South Korea	3	3	0	6	1	+5	6	Semifinals
2	Japan	3	2	1	5	3	+2	4	Semifinals
3	Singapore	3	1	2	3	4	−1	2	
4	Nepal	3	0	3	0	6	−6	0	

Source: Official website

Date	Time		Score		Set 1	Set 2	Set 3
20 Sep	09:00	Japan	1–2	South Korea	21–18	16–21	7–21
20 Sep	09:00	Singapore	2–0	Nepal	21–14	21–7	
20 Sep	14:00	Japan	2–0	Nepal	21–6	21–6	
20 Sep	14:00	Singapore	0–2	South Korea	11–21	6–21	
21 Sep	09:00	Nepal	0–2	South Korea	4–21	9–21	
21 Sep	09:00	Japan	2–1	Singapore	19–21	21–14	25–23

==== Group B ====
Pos	Team	Pld	W	L	SF	SA	SD	Pts	Qualification
1	Myanmar	3	3	0	6	1	+5	6	Semifinals
2	Laos	3	2	1	4	2	+2	4	Semifinals
3	Indonesia	3	1	2	2	4	−2	2	
4	Brunei	3	0	3	1	6	−5	0	

Source: Official website

Date	Time		Score		Set 1	Set 2	Set 3
20 Sep	11:00	Myanmar	2–1	Brunei	21–18	21–23	21–17
20 Sep	11:00	Indonesia	0–2	Laos	16–21	17–21	
20 Sep	16:00	Indonesia	2–0	Brunei	21–11	21–16	
20 Sep	16:00	Myanmar	2–0	Laos	21–19	21–17	
21 Sep	11:00	Laos	2–0	Brunei	21–19	22–20	
21 Sep	11:00	Myanmar	2–0	Indonesia	21–15	21–16	

=== Knockout round ===
Semifinals
21 September
South Korea	2
Laos	0
21 September
Myanmar	2
Japan	0

Gold medal match
22 September
South Korea	0
Myanmar	2

==== Semifinals ====
Date	Time		Score		Set 1	Set 2	Set 3
21 Sep	14:00	South Korea	2–0	Laos	Walkover		
21 Sep	14:00	Myanmar	2–0	Japan	21–13	21–17	

- Laos was disqualified for failing to show up in their match against South Korea. Singapore was awarded bronze as they were the fifth-best team after the group stage.

==== Gold medal match ====
Date	Time		Score		Set 1	Set 2	Set 3
22 Sep	11:00	South Korea	0–2	Myanmar	19–21	18–21	
