= Sepak takraw at the 2014 Asian Games – Women's regu =

Women's regu at the 2014 Asian Games
- Venue: Bucheon Gymnasium
- Date: 29 September – 3 October 2014
- Competitors: 40 from 8 nations

Medalists
gold medal	Thailand
silver medal	South Korea
bronze medal	China
bronze medal	Indonesia

The women's regu sepak takraw competition at the 2014 Asian Games in Incheon was held from 29 September to 3 October at the Bucheon Gymnasium.

== Squads ==
China	India	Indonesia	Japan
Lao Tianxue; Zhang Yanan; Liu Xiaofang; Song Cheng; Cui Yonghui	Jimi Devi Okram; Omita Devi Khangenbam; Priya Devi Khaidem; Keneileno Nakhro; Chaoba Devi Oinam	Leni; Florensia Cristy; Lena; Rike Media Sari; Dini Mita Sari	Sawa Aoki; Chiharu Yano; Satomi Ishihara; Yuumi Kawamata; Yuka Watanabe
Laos	Malaysia	South Korea	Thailand
Nouandam Volabouth; Mely Matmanivong; Koy Xayavong; Sonsavan Keosouliya; Mithananh Bounpaseuth	Noor Fairuz Azizan; Siti Norzubaidah Che Wahab; Elly Syahira Rosli; Nor Farhana Ismail; Nurrashidah Abdul Rashid	Park Seon-ju; Kim I-seul; Lee Min-ju; Lee Jin-hee; Sim Su-yeon	Masaya Duangsri; Sunthari Rupsung; Fueangfa Praphatsarang; Wanwisa Jankaen; Payom Srihongsa

== Results ==
All times are Korea Standard Time (UTC+09:00)

=== Preliminary ===
==== Group A ====
Pos	Team	Pld	W	L	SF	SA	SD	Pts	Qualification
1	China	3	3	0	6	1	+5	6	Semifinals
2	Indonesia	3	2	1	5	2	+3	4	Semifinals
3	Laos	3	1	2	2	4	−2	2	
4	India	3	0	3	0	6	−6	0	

Source: Official website

Date	Time		Score		Set 1	Set 2	Set 3
29 Sep	09:00	China	2–0	Laos	21–16	21–19	
29 Sep	11:00	India	0–2	Indonesia	12–21	13–21	
30 Sep	09:00	China	2–1	Indonesia	13–21	21–12	21–19
30 Sep	11:00	India	0–2	Laos	16–21	14–21	
01 Oct	09:00	China	2–0	India	21–9	21–7	
01 Oct	11:00	Indonesia	2–0	Laos	21–14	21–18	

==== Group B ====
Pos	Team	Pld	W	L	SF	SA	SD	Pts	Qualification
1	Thailand	3	3	0	6	0	+6	6	Semifinals
2	South Korea	3	2	1	4	2	+2	4	Semifinals
3	Japan	3	1	2	2	5	−3	2	
4	Malaysia	3	0	3	1	6	−5	0	

Source: Official website

Date	Time		Score		Set 1	Set 2	Set 3
29 Sep	14:00	Thailand	2–0	South Korea	21–10	21–9	
29 Sep	16:00	Malaysia	1–2	Japan	21–17	15–21	12–21
30 Sep	14:00	Thailand	2–0	Japan	21–10	21–5	
30 Sep	16:00	Malaysia	0–2	South Korea	6–21	9–21	
01 Oct	14:00	Thailand	2–0	Malaysia	21–6	21–11	
01 Oct	14:00	Japan	0–2	South Korea	17–21	14–21	

=== Knockout round ===
Semifinals
2 October
China	1
South Korea	2
2 October
Thailand	2
Indonesia	0

Gold medal match
3 October
South Korea	0
Thailand	2

==== Semifinals ====
Date	Time		Score		Set 1	Set 2	Set 3
02 Oct	14:00	China	1–2	South Korea	21–19	12–21	13–21
02 Oct	16:00	Thailand	2–0	Indonesia	21–19	21–11	

==== Gold medal match ====
Date	Time		Score		Set 1	Set 2	Set 3
03 Oct	09:30	South Korea	0–2	Thailand	12–21	16–21	
