= Yeonhui-dong =

Yeonhui-dong may refer to

- Yeonhui-dong, Seoul
- Yeonhui-dong, Incheon
