= Sepak takraw at the 2014 Asian Games – Men's team regu =

Men's team regu at the 2014 Asian Games
- Venue: Bucheon Gymnasium
- Date: 23–28 September 2014
- Competitors: 83 from 7 nations

Medalists
gold medal	Thailand
silver medal	South Korea
bronze medal	Malaysia
bronze medal	Indonesia

The men's team sepak takraw competition at the 2014 Asian Games in Incheon was held from 23 September to 28 September at the Bucheon Gymnasium.

== Squads ==
China	India	Indonesia	Japan
Wang Maohui; Wu Haoran; Fan Xu; Li Pengfei; Zhang Linye; Yang Jiapeng; Ge Yusheng; Jin Jie; Li Huanhuan; Xu Mingchi; Zhang Ruhao; Gao Xiangyu	Gurumayum Jiteshor Sharma; Sanjeck Singh Waikhom; Akash Yumnam; Dheeraj Kumar; Sandeep Kumar; Gopen Singh Taiyenjam; Niken Singh Khangembam; Lalit Kumar; Jotin Singh Ngathem; Nanao Singh Moirangthem; Viseyie Koso; Seitaram Singh Thokchom	Syamsul Hadi; Syamsul Akmal; Yovi Hendra Utama; Muhammad Ruswan Wajib; Andi Paturay; Firmansyah; Saiful Rijal; Husni Uba; Nofrizal; Hendra Pago; Abrian Sihab Aldilatama; Victoria Eka Prasetyo	Susumu Teramoto; Seiya Takano; Takeshi Terashima; Ryutaro Sakamoto; Tsubasa Sato; Atsuki Shimizu; Masahiro Yamada; Hirokazu Kobayashi; Masanori Hayashi; Toshitaka Naito; Masayuki Ishizuka
Malaysia	South Korea	Thailand	
Ahmad Aizat Nor Azmi; Izurin Refin; Syazreenqamar Salehan; Mohd Helmi Ismail; Fadzli Roslan; Kamal Alfiza Shafie; Amirul Zazwan Amir; Muqlis Borhan; Zuleffendi Sumari; Zamree Dahan; Syahir Rosdi; Idham Sulaiman	Park Hyeon-geun; Woo Gyeong-han; Jeon Young-man; Kim Hyun-jun; Shim Jae-chul; Kim Young-man; Go Jae-uk; Sin Seung-tae; Im An-soo; Shin Choo-kwang; Jeong Won-deok; Hong Seung-hyun	Anuwat Chaichana; Siriwat Sakha; Kritsana Tanakorn; Assadin Wongyota; Pornchai Kaokaew; Sahachat Sakhoncharoen; Pattarapong Yupadee; Thanawat Chumsena; Somporn Jaisinghol; Suriyan Peachan; Supachai Maneenat; Sittipong Khamchan	

== Results ==
All times are Korea Standard Time (UTC+09:00)

=== Preliminary ===
==== Group A ====
Pos	Team	Pld	W	L	MF	MA	MD	Pts	Qualification
1	Thailand	3	3	0	9	0	+9	6	Semifinals
2	South Korea	3	2	1	6	3	+3	4	Semifinals
3	Japan	3	1	2	2	7	−5	2	
4	India	3	0	3	1	8	−7	0	

Source: Official website

Date	Time		Score		Regu 1			Regu 2			Regu 3		
Date	Time		Score		Set 1	Set 2	Set 3	Set 1	Set 2	Set 3	Set 1	Set 2	Set 3
23 Sep	09:00	Thailand	3–0	South Korea	2–0			2–1			2–1		
23 Sep	09:00	Thailand	3–0	South Korea	21–16	21–12		17–21	21–11	21–15	13–21	21–19	21–11
23 Sep	09:00	Japan	2–1	India	1–2			2–0			2–0		
23 Sep	09:00	Japan	2–1	India	21–16	18–21	16–21	21–18	21–15		21–11	21–19	
24 Sep	09:00	Thailand	3–0	India	2–0			2–0			2–0		
24 Sep	09:00	Thailand	3–0	India	21–6	21–13		21–9	21–3		21–9	21–5	
24 Sep	09:00	Japan	0–3	South Korea	0–2			0–2			0–2		
24 Sep	09:00	Japan	0–3	South Korea	9–21	15–21		14–21	14–21		9–21	14–21	
25 Sep	09:00	Thailand	3–0	Japan	2–0			2–0			2–0		
25 Sep	09:00	Thailand	3–0	Japan	21–5	21–7		21–9	21–10		21–13	21–10	
25 Sep	09:00	India	0–3	South Korea	0–2			0–2			0–2		
25 Sep	09:00	India	0–3	South Korea	14–21	11–21		6–21	7–21		5–21	6–21	

==== Group B ====
Pos	Team	Pld	W	L	MF	MA	MD	Pts	Qualification
1	Indonesia	2	2	0	4	2	+2	4	Semifinals
2	Malaysia	2	1	1	4	2	+2	2	Semifinals
3	China	2	0	2	1	5	−4	0	

Source: Official website

Date	Time		Score		Regu 1			Regu 2			Regu 3		
Date	Time		Score		Set 1	Set 2	Set 3	Set 1	Set 2	Set 3	Set 1	Set 2	Set 3
23 Sep	09:00	China	1–2	Indonesia	0–2			0–2			2–1		
23 Sep	09:00	China	1–2	Indonesia	13–21	10–21		12–21	9–21		16–21	24–22	21–18
24 Sep	09:00	Malaysia	1–2	Indonesia	0–2			2–0			0–2		
24 Sep	09:00	Malaysia	1–2	Indonesia	19–21	14–21		22–20	25–23		11–21	21–23	
25 Sep	09:00	Malaysia	3–0	China	2–0			2–0			2–0		
25 Sep	09:00	Malaysia	3–0	China	21–17	21–18		22–20	21–12		21–4	21–16	

=== Knockout round ===
Semifinals
26 September
Thailand	2
Malaysia	0
26 September
Indonesia	0
South Korea	2

Gold medal match
28 September
Thailand	2
South Korea	0

==== Semifinals ====
Date	Time		Score		Regu 1			Regu 2			Regu 3		
Date	Time		Score		Set 1	Set 2	Set 3	Set 1	Set 2	Set 3	Set 1	Set 2	Set 3
26 Sep	09:00	Thailand	2–0	Malaysia	2–0			2–0					
26 Sep	09:00	Thailand	2–0	Malaysia	21–16	21–10		21–14	21–11				
26 Sep	14:30	Indonesia	0–2	South Korea	1–2			1–2					
26 Sep	14:30	Indonesia	0–2	South Korea	21–18	13–21	19–21	19–21	21–19	17–21			

==== Gold medal match ====
Date	Time		Score		Regu 1			Regu 2			Regu 3		
Date	Time		Score		Set 1	Set 2	Set 3	Set 1	Set 2	Set 3	Set 1	Set 2	Set 3
28 Sep	14:30	Thailand	2–0	South Korea	2–0			2–0					
28 Sep	14:30	Thailand	2–0	South Korea	21–10	21–9		21–16	21–14				
