= Sepak takraw at the 2014 Asian Games – Women's doubles =

Women's doubles at the 2014 Asian Games
- Venue: Bucheon Gymnasium
- Date: 20–22 September 2014
- Competitors: 18 from 6 nations

Medalists
gold medal	Myanmar
silver medal	Laos
bronze medal	Vietnam
bronze medal	Japan

The women's double regu sepak takraw competition at the 2014 Asian Games in Incheon was held from 20 September to 22 September at the Bucheon Gymnasium.

== Squads ==
Japan	Laos	Malaysia	Myanmar
Yukie Sato; Sawa Aoki; Chiharu Yano	Nouandam Volabouth; Koy Xayavong; Sonsavan Keosouliya	Nurul Izzatul Hikmah; Nurul Aqirah Mat Tahir; Kamisah Khamis	Kyu Kyu Thin; Khin Hnin Wai; Phyu Phyu Than
South Korea	Vietnam		
Park Seon-ju; Kim I-seul; Lee Min-ju	Nguyễn Thị Quyên; Lê Thị Tâm; Dương Thị Xuyên		

== Results ==
All times are Korea Standard Time (UTC+09:00)

=== Preliminary ===
==== Group A ====
Pos	Team	Pld	W	L	SF	SA	SD	Pts	Qualification
1	Laos	2	1	1	3	2	+1	2	Semifinals
2	Japan	2	1	1	2	2	0	2	Semifinals
3	South Korea	2	1	1	2	3	−1	2	

Source: Official website

Date	Time		Score		Set 1	Set 2	Set 3
20 Sep	09:00	Laos	1–2	South Korea	16–21	21–17	9–21
20 Sep	14:00	Japan	2–0	South Korea	22–20	21–16	
21 Sep	09:00	Japan	0–2	Laos	19–21	18–21	

==== Group B ====
Pos	Team	Pld	W	L	SF	SA	SD	Pts	Qualification
1	Myanmar	2	2	0	4	0	+4	4	Semifinals
2	Vietnam	2	1	1	2	2	0	2	Semifinals
3	Malaysia	2	0	2	0	4	−4	0	

Source: Official website

Date	Time		Score		Set 1	Set 2	Set 3
20 Sep	11:00	Vietnam	2–0	Malaysia	21–14	21–10	
20 Sep	16:00	Myanmar	2–0	Malaysia	21–11	21–11	
21 Sep	11:00	Myanmar	2–0	Vietnam	21–18	21–11	

=== Knockout round ===
Semifinals
21 September
Laos	2
Vietnam	0
21 September
Myanmar	2
Japan	0

Gold medal match
22 September
Laos	0
Myanmar	2

==== Semifinals ====
Date	Time		Score		Set 1	Set 2	Set 3
21 Sep	16:00	Laos	2–0	Vietnam	21–19	21–16	
21 Sep	16:00	Myanmar	2–0	Japan	21–15	21–17	

==== Gold medal match ====
Date	Time		Score		Set 1	Set 2	Set 3
22 Sep	09:30	Laos	0–2	Myanmar	16–21	15–21	
