= Indonesia at the 2014 Asian Games =

- IOC code: INA
- NOC: Indonesian Olympic Committee
- Website: www.nocindonesia.or.id (in English)

in Incheon
- Competitors: 186 in 23 sports
- Flag bearer: I Gede Siman Sudartawa
- Officials: 129
- Medals Ranked 17th: Gold 4 Silver 5 Bronze 11 Total 20

Asian Games appearances (overview)
- 1951; 1954; 1958; 1962; 1966; 1970; 1974; 1978; 1982; 1986; 1990; 1994; 1998; 2002; 2006; 2010; 2014; 2018; 2022; 2026

Indonesia participated in the 2014 Asian Games in Incheon, South Korea from 19 September to 4 October 2014.

== Competitors ==
Sport	Men	Women	Total
Archery	1	8	9
Athletics	0	3	3
Badminton	9	9	18
Beach volleyball	4	0	4
Bowling	6	6	12
Boxing	2	0	2
Canoeing	11	1	12
Cycling	6	5	11
Equestrian	2	2	4
Fencing	0	3	3
Football	20	0	20
Judo	3	0	3
Karate	4	4	8
Rowing	7	6	13
Sailing	1	1	2
Sepaktakraw	12	11	23
Soft Tennis	5	2	7
Swimming	6	0	6
Taekwondo	2	2	4
Tennis	4	0	4
Weightlifting	6	4	10
Wrestling	2	0	2
Wushu	2	4	6
Total	115	71	186

== Medal summary ==
=== Medal by sport ===
Medals by sport
Sport	1st place, gold medalist(s)	2nd place, silver medalist(s)	3rd place, bronze medalist(s)	Total
Athletics	1	0	0	1
Badminton	2	1	1	4
Bowling	0	0	2	2
Equestrian	0	0	1	1
Karate	0	1	0	1
Rowing	0	0	1	1
Sepaktakraw	0	0	3	3
Soft Tennis	0	1	1	2
Weightlifting	0	1	1	2
Wushu	1	1	1	3
Total	4	5	11	20

=== Medal by Date ===
Medals by date
Day	Date	1st place, gold medalist(s)	2nd place, silver medalist(s)	3rd place, bronze medalist(s)	Total
1	20 Sep	0	1	0	1
2	21 Sep	0	0	1	1
3	22 Sep	0	1	0	1
4	23 Sep	0	0	1	1
5	24 Sep	0	0	0	0
6	25 Sep	0	0	2	2
7	26 Sep	0	0	1	1
8	27 Sep	1	0	1	2
9	28 Sep	1	0	1	2
10	29 Sep	1	1	0	2
11	30 Sep	0	1	1	2
12	1 Oct	0	0	1	1
13	2 Oct	1	1	1	4
14	3 Oct	0	0	0	0
15	4 Oct	0	0	0	0
Total		4	5	11	20

=== Medalists ===
Medal	Name	Sport	Event	Date
Gold	Nitya Krishinda Maheswari; Greysia Polii	Badminton	Women's doubles	27 Sep
Gold	Mohammad Ahsan; Hendra Setiawan	Badminton	Men's doubles	28 Sep
Gold	Maria Natalia Londa	Athletics	Women's long jump	29 Sep
~~Silver~~ Gold	Juwita Niza Wasni	Wushu	Women's nanquan	~~20 Sep~~ 2 Oct
Silver	Sri Wahyuni Agustiani	Weightlifting	Women's 48 kg	20 Sep
Silver	Lindswell Kwok	Wushu	Women's taijiquan	22 Sep
Silver	Tontowi Ahmad; Liliyana Natsir	Badminton	Mixed doubles	29 Sep
Silver	Edi Kusdaryanto	Soft tennis	Men's singles	30 Sep
Silver	Fidelys Lolobua	Karate	Men's individual kata	2 Oct
Bronze	Eko Yuli Irawan	Weightlifting	Men's 62 kg	21 Sep
Bronze	Larasati Gading	Equestrian	Individual dressage	23 Sep
Bronze	Tanzil Hadid; Ihram; Ardi Isadi; Muhad Yakin	Rowing	Men's Lightweight Quadruple Sculls	25 Sep
Bronze	Billy Muhammad Islam; Hardy Rachmadian	Bowling	Men's doubles	25 Sep
Bronze	Saiful Rijal; Victoria Eka Prasetyo; Syamsul Hadi; Novrizal; Abrian Sihab Aldilatama; Yovi Hendra Utama; Husni Uba; Syamsul Akmal; Hendra Pago; Muhammad Ruswan Wajib; Andi Paturay; Firmansyah	Sepaktakraw	Men's team	26 Sep
Bronze	Kusnelia; Jumaisah; Rike Sari; Lena; Leni; Isni Sumito; Dini Mita Sari; Widya Modjundju; Irma Wati; Florensia Cristy; Hasmawati Umar	Sepaktakraw	Women's Team	27 Sep
Bronze	Praveen Jordan; Debby Susanto	Badminton	Mixed doubles	28 Sep
Bronze	Tannya Roumimper; Putty Insavilla Armein; Sharon Santoso; Novie Phang; Alisha Larasati	Bowling	Women's team of five	30 Sep
Bronze	Prima Simpatiaji; Maya Rosa	Soft tennis	Mixed doubles	1 Oct
Bronze	Ivana Ardelia Irmanto	Wushu	Women's nanquan	2 Oct
Bronze	Rike Sari; Lena; Leni; Dini Mita Sari; Florensia Cristy	Sepaktakraw	Women's regu	2 Oct

Last updated 4 October 2014

== Archery ==
Men
Athlete	Event	Qualification		Round of 64	Round of 32	Round of 16	Quarterfinals	Semifinals	Final	
Athlete	Event	Score	Seed	Opposition Score	Opposition Score	Opposition Score	Opposition Score	Opposition Score	Opposition Score	Rank
Sapriatno	Compound Individual	684	24	Bye	(21) Alrodhan (KSA); W 144-141	(2) Choi (KOR); L 140-146	did not advance			

Women
Athlete	Event	Qualification		Round of 32	Round of 16	Quarterfinals	Semifinals	Final	
Athlete	Event	Score	Seed	Opposition Score	Opposition Score	Opposition Score	Opposition Score	Opposition Score	Rank
Della Adisty Handayani	Compound Individual	659	29	did not advance					
Rona Riska Sari	Compound Individual	670	22	did not advance					
Sri Ranti	Compound Individual	681	9	Bye	(10) Al Mashhadani (IRQ); W 143-138	(1) Choi (KOR); L 142-144	did not advance		
Threesyadinda Dellie	Compound Individual	683	6	Bye	(16) Tindugan (PHI); W 138-136	(5) Huang (TPE); L 132-141	did not advance		
Diananda Choirunisa	Recurve Individual	1318	16	(36) Ray (BAN); W 6-2 (2-0, 2-0, 0-2, 2-0)	(8) Kumari (IND); W 6-0 (2-0, 2-0, 2-0)	(4) Xu (CHN); L 4-6 (0-2, 2-0, 0-2, 1-1, 1-1)	did not advance		
Erwina Safitri	Recurve Individual	1285	25	did not advance					
Ika Yuliana Rochmawati	Recurve Individual	1294	23	(26) Loc (VIE); L 2-6 (1-1, 0-2, 1-1, 0-2)	did not advance				
Titik Kusumawardani	Recurve Individual	1273	29	did not advance					
Rona Riska Sari; Sri Ranti; Threesyadinda Dellie	Compound Team	2034	5		Bye	(4) Iran (IRI); L 222-227	did not advance		
Diananda Choirunisa; Erwina Safitri; Ika Yuliana Rochmawati	Recurve Team	3897	6		(11) Bangladesh (BAN); W 6-0 (2-0, 2-0, 2-0)	(3) Japan (JPN); L 4-5 (0-2, 2-0, 0-2, 2-0, 0-1)	did not advance		

== Athletics ==
Women
Athletes	Event	Heat		Final	
Athletes	Event	Result	Rank	Result	Rank
Dedeh Erawati	100 m Hurdles	13.70	4 q	Disqualified	
Rini Budiarti	3000 m Steeplechase			9:49.46 NR	5
Maria Londa	Long Jump			6.55 m =NR	Gold medal
Maria Londa	Triple Jump			13.39 m	10

== Badminton ==
Men
Athlete	Event	Round of 32	Round of 16	Quarterfinals	Semifinals	Final	
Athlete	Event	Opposition Score	Opposition Score	Opposition Score	Opposition Score	Opposition Score	Rank
(4) Tommy Sugiarto	Singles	Rasheed (MDV); W 21-6, 21-8	Wei (HKG); L 17-21, 23-21, 16-21	Did not advance			
Ihsan Maulana Mustofa	Singles	Al Yafei (QAT); W 21-3, 21-2	Nguyễn (VIE); L 9-21, 13-21	Did not advance			
(2) Mohammad Ahsan; Hendra Setiawan	Doubles	Bye	Lee / Tang (HKG); W 21-11, 21-15	Attri / Reddy (IND); W 21-12, 21-19	(4) Kim / Kim (KOR); W 19-21, 21-16, 21-18	(1) Lee / Yoo (KOR); W 21-16, 16-21, 21-17	Gold medal
(7) Angga Pratama; Rian Agung Saputro	Doubles	Bye	Cai / Fu (CHN); W 12-21, 21-19, 22-20	(1) Lee / Yoo (KOR); L 11-21, 16-21	Did not advance		
(2) Tommy Sugiarto; Ihsan Maulana Mustofa; Jonatan Christie; Mohammad Ahsan; Hendra Setiawan; Angga Pratama; Rian Agung Saputro	Team		Bye	Chinese Taipei (TPE); L 1-3	Did not advance		

Women
Athlete	Event	Round of 32	Round of 16	Quarterfinals	Semifinals	Final	
Athlete	Event	Opposition Score	Opposition Score	Opposition Score	Opposition Score	Opposition Score	Rank
Lindaweni Fanetri	Singles	(2) Wang (CHN); L 16-21, 16-21	Did not advance				
Bellaetrix Manuputty	Singles	Tamang (NEP); W 21-5, 21-17	(8) Sindhu (IND); W 20-22, 21-16, 22-20	(1) Li (CHN); L 9-21, 19-21	Did not advance		
(7) Greysia Polii; Nitya Krishinda Maheswari	Doubles	Rasheed / Abdul Razzaq (MDV); W 21-8, 21-5	Cheng / Hsieh (TPE); W 21-17, 16-21, 24-22	(3) Kakiiwa / Maeda (JPN); W 22-20, 21-17	(2) Tian / Zhao (CHN); W 21-17, 19-21, 21-17	(1) Matsutomo / Takahashi (JPN); W 21-15, 21-9	Gold medal
Suci Rizki Andini; Tiara Rosalia Nuraidah	Doubles	Tamang / Tamang (NEP); W 21-4, 21-13	(1) Matsutomo / Takahashi (JPN); L 22-20, 16-21, 6-21	Did not advance			
Lindaweni Fanetri; Bellaetrix Manuputty; Hana Ramadhini; Greysia Polii; Nitya Krishinda Maheswari; Suci Rizki Andini; Tiara Rosalia Nuraidah	Team		Maldives (MDV); W 3-0	(3) Japan (JPN); L 0-3	Did not advance		

Mixed
Athlete	Event	Round of 32	Round of 16	Quarterfinals	Semifinals	Final	
Athlete	Event	Opposition Score	Opposition Score	Opposition Score	Opposition Score	Opposition Score	Rank
(3) Tontowi Ahmad; Liliyana Natsir	Doubles	Shrestha / Tamang (NEP); W 21-4, 21-9	Chan / Tse (HKG); W 21-19, 21-12	Shin / Chang (KOR); W 19-21, 21-16, 21-9	(2) Xu / Ma (CHN); W 21-12, 21-10	(1) Zhang / Zhao (CHN); L 16-21, 14-21	Silver medal
Praveen Jordan; Debby Susanto	Doubles	Bhatti / Bashir (PAK); W 21-13, 21-3	(7) Lee / Chau (HKG); W 21-19, 21-19	(4) Ko / Kim (KOR); W 21-9, 9-21, 21-15	(1) Zhang / Zhao (CHN); L 19-21, 17-21	Did not advance	3rd place, bronze medalist(s)

== Beach volleyball ==
Men
Athlete	Event	Preliminary Round			Round of 16	Quarterfinals	Semifinals	Final	
Athlete	Event	Opposition Score	Opposition Score	Opposition Score	Opposition Score	Opposition Score	Opposition Score	Opposition Score	Rank
Ade Candra Rachmawan; Koko Prasetyo Darkuncoro	Men's Team	Meyagul / Sadat (AFG); W 2-0 (21-12, 21-11)	Yungtin / Sukarayotin (THA); W 2-0 (22-20, 21-18)	Abdulaziz / Yaqoub (KUW); W 2-0 (21-9, 21-0)	Rafi / Razif (MAS); W 2-0 (21-11, 21-13)	Santoso / Fahriansyah (INA); W 2-0 (21-7, 21-17)	Chen / Li (CHN); L 1-2 (21-15, 20-22, 13-15)	Bronze-medal match Halikejiang / Bao (CHN)} L 0-2 (17-21, 11-21)	4
Dian Putra Santoso; Fahriansyah	Men's Team	Lekamalage / Ekanayakage (SRI); W 2-1 (14-21, 21-18, 15-10)	Chen / Li (CHN); L 0-2 (17-21, 13-21)	Safi / Ali Mohammad (AFG); W 2-0 (21-12, 21-18)	Santos / Pereira (QAT); W 2-1 (11-21, 21-19, 17-15)	Rachmawan / Darkuncoro (INA); L 0-2 (7-21, 17-21)	did not advance		

== Bowling ==
Men
Athlete	Event	Score	Rank
Ryan Leonard Lalisang	Singles	1253	11
Ryan Leonard Lalisang	All Event	4986	4
Ryan Leonard Lalisang	Masters	3350	8
Yeri Ramadona	Singles	1216	22
Yeri Ramadona	All Event	4768	29
Billy Muhammad Islam	Singles	1218	21
Billy Muhammad Islam	All Event	4914	10
Billy Muhammad Islam	Masters	3284	11
Diwan Rezaldy Syahril	Singles	1147	57
Diwan Rezaldy Syahril	All Event	4802	24
Hardy Rachmadian	Singles	1171	48
Hardy Rachmadian	All Event	4701	40
Adhiguna Widiantoro	Singles	1161	53
Adhiguna Widiantoro	All Event	4301	81
Adhiguna Widiantoro; Diwan Rezaldy Syahril	Doubles	2319	25
Billy Muhammad Islam; Hardy Rachmadian	Doubles	2489	3rd place, bronze medalist(s)
Ryan Leonard Lalisang; Yeri Ramadona	Doubles	2425	7
Ryan Leonard Lalisang; Yeri Ramadona; Hardy Rachmadian	Trios	3686	7
Billy Muhammad Islam; Diwan Rezaldy; Adhiguna Widiantoro	Trios	3456	17
Ryan Leonard Lalisang; Yeri Ramadona; Hardy Rachmadian; Billy Muhammad Islam; Diwan Rezaldy	Team of Five	5837	6

Women
Athlete	Event	Score	Rank
Tannya Roumimper	Singles	1110	42
Tannya Roumimper	All Event	4742	18
Putty Insavilla Armein	Singles	1225	14
Putty Insavilla Armein	All Event	4785	15
Putty Insavilla Armein	Masters	3181	12
Novie Phang	Singles	1180	25
Novie Phang	All Event	4500	45
Cheya Chantika	Singles	1059	56
Cheya Chantika	All Event	4136	61
Sharon Santoso	Singles	1246	8
Sharon Santoso	All Event	4826	12
Sharon Santoso	Masters	3321	4
Alisha Larasati	Singles	1067	52
Alisha Larasati	All Event	4443	47
Novie Phang; Tannya Roumimper	Doubles	2306	16
Alisha Larasati; Cheya Chantika	Doubles	2140	27
Putty Insavilla Armein; Sharon Santoso	Doubles	2433	5
Novie Phang; Alisha Larasati; Cheya Chantika	Trios	3077	20
Tannya Roumimper; Putty Insavilla Armein; Sharon Santoso	Trios	3684	4
Tannya Roumimper; Putty Insavilla Armein; Sharon Santoso; Novie Phang; Alisha Larasati	Team of Five	5840	3rd place, bronze medalist(s)

== Boxing ==
Men
Athlete	Event	Round of 32	Round of 16	Quarterfinals	Semifinals	Final	
Athlete	Event	Opposition Score	Opposition Score	Opposition Score	Opposition Score	Opposition Score	Rank
Kornelis Kwangu Langu	-49 kg	Rasulov (TJK); W 2-1	Dusmatov (UZB); L 3-0	Did not advance			
Julio Bria	-52 kg	Bye	Suleimenov (KAZ); L 0-3	Did not advance			

== Canoeing ==
=== Sprint ===
Men
Athletes	Event	Heat Summary		Semifinal		Final	
Athletes	Event	Result	Rank	Result	Rank	Result	Rank
Spens Stuber Mehue	Canoe Single 200 m	41.246	7	42.976	2	43.085	8
Anwar Tarra	Canoe Single 1000 m	4:23.372	6 Q			4:18.536	8
Marjuki; Spens Stuber Mehue	Canoe Double 1000 m	4:02.606	5 Q			4:17.739	9
Andri Sugiarto	Kayak Single 200 m	36.061	8	37.850	3	38.086	9
Sutrisno	Kayak Single 1000 m	4:09.204	10	4:06.299	6	Did not advance	
Gandie; Silo	Kayak Double 200 m	33.116	9	34.628	3	34.466	8
Gandie; Silo	Kayak Double 1000 m	3:35.651	9	3:45.955	5	Did not advance	
Andri Sugiarto; Maizir Riyondra; Dedi Suyatno; Muchlis	Kayak Four 1000 m	3:10.312	5 Q			3:12.178	5

Women
Athletes	Event	Heat Summary		Semifinal		Final	
Athletes	Event	Result	Rank	Result	Rank	Result	Rank
Erni Sokoy	Kayak Single 200 m	44.496	9	44.961	3	44.736	9
Erni Sokoy	Kayak Single 500 m	2:04.217	7 Q			2:04.763	9

== Cycling ==
=== BMX ===
Men
Athletes	Event	Seeding Run		Run 1		Run 2		Run 3		Total points	
Athletes	Event	Result	Rank	Result	Rank	Result	Rank	Result	Rank	Point	Rank
Toni Syarifudin	Men's BMX	37.056	7	36.856	4	37.835	5	36.624	4	13	5

Women
Athletes	Event	Seeding Run		Run 1		Run 2		Run 3		Total points	
Athletes	Event	Result	Rank	Result	Rank	Result	Rank	Result	Rank	Point	Rank
Elga Kharisma Novanda	Women's BMX	39.618	4	39.435	3	40.368	4	40.640	4	11	4

=== Mountain Bike ===
Men
Athletes	Event	Time	Rank
Bandi Sugito	Men's Mountain Bike	1:58:56	14
Chandra Rafsanzani	Men's Mountain Bike	1:54:40	12

Women
Athletes	Event	Time	Rank
Kusmawati Yazid	Women's Mountain Bike	1:35:36	5
Wilhemina	Women's Mountain Bike	1:36:57	7

=== Road ===
Men
Athletes	Event	Time	Rank
Ryan Ariehaan	Individual Time Trial	56:20.02	14
Cahyadi Aiman	Road Race	4:17:10	27
Hari Fitrianto	Road Race	4:17:10	29

Women
Athletes	Event	Time	Rank
Fitriani	Road Race	3:39:33	16
Yanthi Fuchianty	Road Race	3:39:33	18

== Equestrian ==
Dressage
Athlete	Horse	Event	Prix St-George		Intermediate I		Final	
Athlete	Horse	Event	Points	Rank	Points	Rank	Points	Rank
Larasati Gading	Wallenstein 145	Individual	70.684	4 Q	71.632	3 Q	74.075	3rd place, bronze medalist(s)
Alfaro Menayang	Diamond Boy 8	Individual	67.342	14 Q	68.763	9 Q	68.600	9
Ferry Hadiyanto	Romaniero	Individual	63.921	25 Q	65.079	24	Did not advance	
Larasati Gading; Alfaro Menayang; Ferry Hadiyanto	Wallenstein 145; Diamond Boy 8 Doucer 3	Team					67.316	4

Jumping
Athlete	Horse	Event	Qualifiers			Final			Jump Off		Rank
Athlete	Horse	Event	1st	2nd	Total	Round A	Round B	Total	Penalty	Time	Rank
Diah Wulandari Hamidjojo	General G	Individual	15 (36)	7 (28)	22 (33)	17 (=26)	did not advance				20

== Fencing ==
Women
Athletes	Event	Qualifying		Round of 16	Quarterfinal	Semifinal	Final	
Athletes	Event	Win–loss Ratio	Rank	Opposition Score	Opposition Score	Opposition Score	Opposition Score	Rank
Diah Permatasari	Sabre Individual	0.4000 (2W-3L)	4	Au (HKG); L 9-15	Did not advance			
Reni Anggraini	Sabre Individual	0.0000 (0W-4L)	5	Did not advance				
Diah Permatasari; Ima Sapitri; Reni Anggraini	Sabre Team				Kazakhstan (KAZ); L 31-45	did not advance		

== Football ==
=== Men's tournament ===
==== First round ====
Pos	Team	Pld	W	D	L	GF	GA	GD	Pts
1	Thailand	3	3	0	0	11	0	+11	9
2	Indonesia	3	2	0	1	11	6	+5	6
3	Maldives	3	1	0	2	3	8	−5	3
4	East Timor	3	0	0	3	2	13	−11	0

Source: RSSSF
September 15, 2014
17:00

Timor-Leste	0–7	Indonesia
	Report	F. Sinaga 7', 11', 36', 84'; Tuasalamony 78' (pen.); Novri 82'; Fandi Eko 87'

Goyang Stadium
Referee: Yu Ming-hsun (Chinese Taipei)

September 18, 2014
14:00

Maldives	0–4	Indonesia
5	Report	Lestaluhu 12'; F. Sinaga 49', 82' (pen.); Gatra 57'

Incheon Football Stadium
Referee: Ali Sabah Adday Al-Qaysi (Iraq)

September 22, 2014
20:00

Indonesia	0–6	Thailand
	Report	Chayanan 7'; Adisak 17', 90+1'; Chanathip 57'; Kroekrit 76'; Pinyo 82'

Incheon Football Stadium
Referee: Armughan Rowan (India)

==== Round of 16 ====
September 26
20:00

North Korea	4–1	Indonesia
Pak Kwang-Ryong 19'; Jo Kwang 40'; Jong Il-gwan 41', 66'	Report	Fandi Eko 60'

Ansan Wa~ Stadium
Referee: Khamis Al-Marri (Qatar)

== Judo ==
Men
Athlete	Event	Round of 32	Round of 16	Quarterfinals	Semifinals	Final	
Athlete	Event	Opposition Score	Opposition Score	Opposition Score	Opposition Score	Opposition Score	Rank
Iksan Apriyadi	-73 kg	Al Ansi (QAT); W 110 : 000	Huang (TPE); L 000 : 100	Did not advance			
Putu Wiradumangga Adesta	-81 kg	bye	Kalkamanuly (KAZ); L 000 : 100	Did not advance			
Horas Manurung	-90 kg	Khankan (SYR); W 010 : 000	Bolat (KAZ); L 000 : 100	Did not advance			

== Karate ==
Men
Athlete	Event	Round of 32	Round of 16	Quarterfinals	Semifinals	Final	
Athlete	Event	Opposition Score	Opposition Score	Opposition Score	Opposition Score	Opposition Score	Rank
Fidelys Lolobua	Kata		Hashem (QAT); W 4 - 1	Almaazmi (UAE); W 3 - 2	Cheng (HKG); W 5 - 0	Lim (MAS); L 2 - 3	2nd place, silver medalist(s)
Suryadi	-55 kg		Alharbi (KSA); L 2 - 4	Repechage Contest; Cheung (HKG); W 5 - 1	Repechage Bronze medal Silvarajoo (MAS); L 4 - 4 (0-5)	Did not advance	
Jintar Simanjuntak	-67 kg	Bye	Kang (PRK); W 6 - 0	Shinohara (JPN); L 0 - 1	Repechage Contest; Kim (KOR); L 1 - 2	Did not advance	
Hendro Salim	-84 kg		Islam (BAN); W 9 - 3	Shadykanov (KGZ); W 9 - 3	Alnweam (KUW); L 1 - 2	Repechage Bronze medal Akhatov (UZB); L 7 - 7 (0-6)	

Women
Athlete	Event	Round of 32	Round of 16	Quarterfinals	Semifinals	Final	
Athlete	Event	Opposition Score	Opposition Score	Opposition Score	Opposition Score	Opposition Score	Rank
Sisilia Agustiani Ora	Kata		Bye	Shimizu (JPN); L 0 - 5	Repechage Bronze medal Cheung (MAC); L 1 - 5	Did not advance	
Sru Nita Sari Sukatendel	-50 kg	Bye	Arevalo (PHI); W 8 - 0	Doustri (IRI); L 3 - 4	Did not advance		
Cok Istri Agung Sanistyarani	-55 kg		Zakharova (KAZ); L 0 - 8	Repechage Contest; Ahn (KOR); W 2 - 1	Repechage Bronze medal Soriano (PHI); L 3 - 11	Did not advance	
Yuswinda Eka Puspitasari	+68 kg			Bye	Abbasali (IRI); L 0 - 7	Repechage Bronze medal Pereira (MAC); L 2 - 3	

== Rowing ==
Men
Athletes	Event	Heat Summary		Repechage		Final B		Final A	
Athletes	Event	Result	Rank	Result	Rank	Result	Rank	Result	Rank
Memo	Single Sculls	7:23.19	4	7:13.14	2			7:17.29	4
Arief; Thomas Hallatu	Lightweight Double Sculls	6:54.82	7	6:49.82	5	7:01.09	4	did not advance	
Tanzil Hadid; Ihram; Ardi Isadi; Muhad Yakin	Lightweight Quadruple Sculls	6:16.82	3	6:13.97	1			6:09.80	3rd place, bronze medalist(s)

Women
Athletes	Event	Heat Summary		Repechage		Final	
Athletes	Event	Result	Rank	Result	Rank	Result	Rank
Chelsea Corputty; Wa Ode Fitri	Pair	7:49.59	4			7:53.80	4
Maryam Daimoi; Yuniarty	Lightweight Double Sculls	7:43.42	4			7:33.43	4
Maryam Daimoi; Syiva Lisdiana; Yayah Rokayah; Yuniarty	Lightweight Quadruple Sculls	6:59.98	1			7:50.02	5

== Sailing ==
Men
Athlete	Event	Race												Total	Rank
Athlete	Event	1	2	3	4	5	6	7	8	9	10	11	12	Total	Rank
I Gede Subagiasa	Mistral	4	6	4	5	3	3	6	3	5	5	~~6~~	3	47	5

Women
Athlete	Event	Race												Total	Rank
Athlete	Event	1	2	3	4	5	6	7	8	9	10	11	12	Total	Rank
Hoiriyah	RS:One	5	5	5	6	6	5	6	6	6	5	~~6~~	5	60	5

== Sepaktakraw ==
Men
Athlete	Event	Preliminary Pool			Semifinals	Final	
Athlete	Event	Opposition Score	Opposition Score	Opposition Score	Opposition Score	Opposition Score	Rank
Saiful Rijal; Nofrizal; Syamsul Hadi	Doubles	Laos (LAO); L 0-2 (16-21, 17-21)	Brunei (BRU); W 2-0 (21-11, 21-16)	Myanmar (MYA); L 0-2 (15-21, 16-21)	did not advance		
Eka Prasetyo; Saiful Rijal; Syamsul Akmal; Hendra Pago; Nofrizal; Abrian Aldilatama; Husni Uba; Ruswan Wajib; Yovi Utama; Syamsul Hadi; Andi Paturay; Firmansyah	Team	China (CHN); W 2-1 (2-0, 2-0, 1-2)	Malaysia (MAS); W 2-1 (2-0, 0-2, 2-0)		South Korea (KOR); L 0-2 (1-2, 1-2)	Did not advance	3rd place, bronze medalist(s)

Women
Athlete	Event	Preliminary Pool			Semifinals	Final	
Athlete	Event	Opposition Score	Opposition Score	Opposition Score	Opposition Score	Opposition Score	Rank
Rike Sari; Lena; Leni; Dini Mita Sari; Florensia Cristy	Regu	India (IND); W 2-0 (21-12, 21-13)	China (CHN); L 1-2 (13-21, 21-12, 19-21)	Laos (LAO); W 2-0 (21-14, 21-18)	Thailand (THA); L 0-2 (19-21, 11-21)	Did not advance	3rd place, bronze medalist(s)
Kusnelia; Jumaisah; Rike Sari; Lena; Leni; Isni Sumito; Dini Mita Sari; Widya Modjundju; Irma Wati; Florensia Cristy; Hasmawati Umar	Team	Vietnam (VIE); W 2-1 (2-0, 2-0, 0-2)	China (CHN); W 2-1 (2-0, 2-0, 0-2)		Myanmar (MYA); L 1-2 (2-0, 1-2, 1-2)	Did not advance	3rd place, bronze medalist(s)

== Soft Tennis ==
Men
Athlete	Event	Preliminary Round	Quarterfinals	Semifinals	Final	
Athlete	Event	Opposition Score	Opposition Score	Opposition Score	Opposition Score	Rank
Edi Kusdaryanto	Singles	Uayporn (THA); W 4 - 1 (2-4, 4-1, 6-4, 4-2, 4-1); Arcilla (PHI); W 4 - 2 (0-4, 2-4, 4-1, 4-1, 4-2, 5-3); Bhandari (NEP); W 4 - 0 (4-2, 4-0, 11-9, 4-2); Bolortuya (MGL); L 1 - 4 (6-4, 3-5, 1-4, 2-4, 1-4); Zhang (CHN); W 4 - 3 (5-3, 3-5, 4-1, 5-7, 4-0, 0-4, 7-3)	Arcilla (PHI); W 4 - 1 (4-2, 4-2, 5-3, 4-6, 5-3)	Zhou (CHN); W 4 - 1 (4-1, 5-3, 4-2, 4-6, 5-3)	Kim (KOR); L 0 - 4 (2-4, 0-4, 0-4, 2-4)	Silver medal
Hendri Pramono	Singles	Tran (VIE); W 4 - 0 (5-3, 7-5, 4-2, 4-2); Arcilla (PHI); L 2 - 4 (4-2, 2-4, 4-1, 2-4, 1-4, 1-4); Bounsa (LAO); W 4 - 2 (2-4, 5-3, 1-4, 4-1, 5-3, 4-2); Enkhbaatar (MGL); W 4 - 2 (4-0, 2-4, 4-1, 4-2, 11-13, 4-0); Zhou (CHN); L 1 - 4 (4-2, 3-5, 3-5, 1-4, 1-4)	did not advance			
Prima Simpatiaji; Edi Kusdaryanto	Doubles	Lin / Li (TPE); L 1 - 5 (5-7, 6-4, 4-6, 1-4, 0-4, 2-4); Yakhyaev / Rajabaliev (TJK); W 5 - 0 (4-0, 4-2, 7-5, 4-1, 4-2); Lin / Zhang (CHN); W 5 - 3 (6-4, 2-4, 4-2, 3-5, 4-6, 4-2, 4-1, 4-0); Khamphoumy / Phongsavanh (LAO); W 5 - 0 (5-3, 8-6, 4-2, 6-4, 4-0)	Park (KOR); L 0 - 5 (1-4, 3-5, 1-4, 2-4, 1-4)	Did not advance		
Hendri Pramono; Ferdy Narun	Doubles	Kim / Kim (KOR); L 0 - 5 (3-5, 2-4, 1-4, 2-4, 3-5); Zhou / Shi (CHN); W 5 - 2 (2-4, 4-0, 3-5, 4-2, 4-2, 10-8, 4-2); Subba / Bhandari (NEP); W 5 - 4 (2-4, 0-4, 2-4, 3-5, 4-2, 4-2, 4-1, 4-1, 7-4); Bounsa / Chittakone (LAO); W 5 - 0 (4-0, 4-1, 4-2, 6-4, 4-2)	Lai / Ho (TPE); L 2 - 5 (2-4, 4-1, 4-1, 4-6, 1-4, 3-5, 2-4)	Did not advance		
Prima Simpatiaji; Edi Kusdaryanto; Hendri Pramono; Ferdy Narun	Team	Chinese Taipei (TPE); L 0 - 3 (0-5, 1-4, 0-5); China (CHN); L 1 - 2 (3-5, 4-3, 2-5); Nepal (NEP); W 2 - 0 (5-0, 4-0); Vietnam (VIE); W 2 - 0 Retired		Did not advance		

Women
Athlete	Event	Preliminary Round	Quarterfinals	Semifinals	Final	
Athlete	Event	Opposition Score	Opposition Score	Opposition Score	Opposition Score	Rank
Dwi Rahayu Pitri	Singles	Kim (KOR); L 1 - 4 (1-4, 2-4, 4-0, 0-4, 2-4); Cheng (TPE); L 0 - 4 (0-4, 2-4, 1-4, 0-4); Oba (JPN); L 1 - 4 (4-2, 2-4, 2-4, 0-4, 3-5)	did not advance			
Maya Rosa Stefanie	Singles	Tran (VIE); W 4 - 0 (5-3, 4-2, 4-1, 4-2); Amarsanaa (MGL); W 4 - 0 (6-4, 4-0, 4-0, 4-1); Kayastha (NEP); W 4 - 0 (8-6, 4-1, 4-1, 4-2); Zhong (CHN); L 0 - 4 (4-6-0, 1-4, 0-4, 7-9)	Chen Hui (CHN); L 0 - 4 (2-4-0, 0-4, 0-4, 1-4)	Did not advance		
Dwi Rahayu Pitri; Maya Rosa Stefanie	Doubles	Cheng / Chen (TPE); L 0 - 5 (3-5, 1-4, 1-4, 2-4, 4-6); Kobayashi / Morihara (JPN); L 1 - 5 (0-4, 0-4, 2-4, 1-4, 6-4, 0-4); Amarsanaa / Sugar (MGL); W 5 - 2 (4-0, 3-5, 4-1, 3-5, 4-2, 4-1, 4-0)	Did not advance			

Mixed
Athlete	Event	Preliminary Round	Quarterfinals	Semifinals	Final	
Athlete	Event	Opposition Score	Opposition Score	Opposition Score	Opposition Score	Rank
Dwi Rahayu Pitri; Ferdy Fauzi Narun	Doubles	Kim / Kim (KOR); L 0 - 5 (2-4, 0-4, 3-5, 0-4, 1-4); Nakamoto / Kobayashi (JPN); L 2 - 5 (0-4, 0-4, 4-1, 0-4, 4-2, 1-4, 2-4); Li / Cheng (TPE); L 2 - 5 (4-2, 4-6, 0-4, 1-4, 4-2, 0-4, 3-5)	did not advance			
Maya Rosa Stefanie; Prima Simpatiaji	Doubles	Sengchanh / Bounsa Ath (LAO); W 5 - 1 (5-3, 4-1, 0-4, 4-0, 4-0, 7-5); Ngan / Khuong (VIE); W 5 - 0 (4-0, 4-0, 4-0, 8-6, 4-0); Subba / Kayastha (NEP); W 5 - 2 (4-6, 4-1, 4-1, 4-1, 4-1, 2-4, 4-0); Zhou / Chen Hui (CHN); L 0 - 5 (2-4, 6-8, 1-4, 0-4, 3-5)	Uchirsaikhan / Bulgan (MGL); W 5 - 4 (4-1, 5-7, 4-2, 2-4, 3-5, 4-2, 2-4, 4-0, 11-9)	Zhou / Chen Hui (CHN); L 3 - 5 (4-2, 4-0, 0-4, 4-0, 1-4, 3-5, 4-6)	Did not advance	3rd place, bronze medalist(s)

== Swimming ==
Men
Athletes	Event	Heat Summary		Final	
Athletes	Event	Result	Rank	Result	Rank
Alexis Omar Wijaya	100m Freestyle	52.69	20	did not advance	
Dennis Josua Tiwa	50m Breaststroke	29.38	13	did not advance	
Dennis Josua Tiwa	100m Breaststroke	1:04.57	19	did not advance	
Glenn Victor Sutanto	50m Butterfly	24.87	9 A	did not advance	
Glenn Victor Sutanto	100m Butterfly	53.86	7 Q	53.79	7
Glenn Victor Sutanto	50m Freestyle	23.75	18	did not advance	
I Gede Siman Sudartawa	50m Backstroke	25.40	4 Q	25.42	4
I Gede Siman Sudartawa	100m Backstroke	56.35	6 Q	55.73	6
Ricky Anggawidjaja	50m Backstroke	26.84	15	did not advance	
Ricky Anggawidjaja	100m Backstroke	58.03	18	did not advance	
Ricky Anggawidjaja	200m Backstroke	2:05.55	7 Q	2:06.41	7
Ricky Anggawidjaja	200m Freestyle	1:57.39	18	did not advance	
Ricky Anggawidjaja	400m Freestyle	4:04.81	15	did not advance	
Triady Fauzi Sidiq	50m Freestyle	23.31	9 A	did not advance	
Triady Fauzi Sidiq	100m Freestyle	51.48	16	did not advance	
Triady Fauzi Sidiq	200m Individual Medley	2:02.47	5 Q	2:02.80	6
Triady Fauzi Sidiq; Alexis Wijaya Ohmar; I Gede Siman Sudartawa; Ricky Anggawidjaja	4 × 100 m Freestyle Relay	3:28.32	8 Q	3:27.54	8
I Gede Siman Sudartawa; Dennis Josua Tiwa; Glenn Victor Sutanto; Triady Fauzi Sidiq	4 × 100 m Medley Relay	3:45.93	5 Q	3:43.81	5

== Taekwondo ==
Men
Athlete	Event	Round of 32	Round of 16	Quarterfinals	Semifinals	Final	
Athlete	Event	Opposition Score	Opposition Score	Opposition Score	Opposition Score	Opposition Score	Rank
Aggie Prasbowo	-54 kg	Sawekwiharee (THA); L 8 - 15	Did not advance				
Ario Ong	-58 kg	Almaazmi (UAE); W 15 - 6	Penjor (BHU); W 7 - 2	Mamayev (KAZ); L 4- 10	Did not advance		

Women
Athlete	Event	Round of 32	Round of 16	Quarterfinals	Semifinals	Final	
Athlete	Event	Opposition Score	Opposition Score	Opposition Score	Opposition Score	Opposition Score	Rank
Aghniny Haque	-46 kg	Bye	Aladaileh (JOR); W 17-4	Kim (KOR); L 1-4	Did not advance		
Mariska Halinda	-57 kg	Sheshpari (IRI); L 6-12	Did not advance				

== Tennis ==
Men
Athlete	Event	First round	Second round	Third round	Quarterfinals	Semifinals	Final	
Athlete	Event	Opposition Score	Opposition Score	Opposition Score	Opposition Score	Opposition Score	Opposition Score	Rank
(13) Christopher Rungkat	Singles	Bye	Sofaer (HKG); W 6-2, 6-3	(4) Bhambri (IND); L 3-6, 3-6	Did not advance			
David Agung Susanto	Singles	Zayed (QAT); W 6-1, 6-3	(8) Wu (CHN); L 3-6, 0-6	Did not advance				
David Agung Susanto; Aditya Harry Sasongko	Doubles	Mohammad / Abdulhameed (KUW); W 6-2, 6-2	(8) Chung / Lim (KOR); L 5-7, 1-6		Did not advance			
Christopher Rungkat; Alexander Elbert Sie	Doubles	Sofaer / Li (HKG); W 6-2, 7-5	(3) Chen / Peng (TPE); L 4-6, 4-6		Did not advance			
Aditya Harry Sasongko; Alexander Elbert Sie; Christopher Rungkat; David Agung Susanto	Team	Bye	Thailand (THA); L 0-3 (0-2, 0-2, 0-2)		Did not advance			

== Weightlifting ==
Men
Athlete	Event	Snatch		Clean & jerk		Total	Rank
Athlete	Event	Result	Rank	Result	Rank	Total	Rank
Surahmat Wijoyo	-56 kg	114 kg	9	149 kg	6	263 kg	8
Eko Yuli Irawan	-62 kg	142 kg	4	166 kg	3	308 kg	3rd place, bronze medalist(s)
Muhamad Hasbi	-62 kg	133 kg	6	165 kg	4	298 kg	6
Deni	-69 kg	146 kg	4	176 kg	4	322 kg	4
I Ketut Ariana	-69 kg	Did not finish					
Triyatno	-77 kg	145 kg	8	176 kg	5	321 kg	8

Women
Athlete	Event	Snatch		Clean & jerk		Total	Rank
Athlete	Event	Result	Rank	Result	Rank	Total	Rank
Sri Wahyuni Agustiani	-48 kg	80 kg	6	107 kg	1	187 kg	2nd place, silver medalist(s)
Citra Febrianti	-53 kg	Did not finish					
Syarah Anggraini	-53 kg	82 kg	9	101 kg	10	183 kg	10
Sinta Darmariani	-63 kg	92 kg	6	115 kg	6	207 kg	6

== Wrestling ==
Men
Athlete	Event	1/8 Finals	1/4 Finals	Semifinals	Final	
Athlete	Event	Opposition Score	Opposition Score	Opposition Score	Opposition Score	Rank
Kusno Hadi Saputra	Men's Greco-Roman 75 kg	Sirithahan (THA); W 5-0	Kanakubo (JPN); L 0-3	Repechage Contests; Atayev (TKM); L 1-3	Did not advance	7
Fahriansyah	Men's Freestyle 86 kg	Melejayef (TKM); L 1 - 3	Did not advance			11

== Wushu ==
Men's Taolu
Athlete	Event	Qualification	Final	Total	Rank
Achmad Hulaefi	Daoshu/Gunshu	9.59	9.50	19.09	5

Men's Sanda
Athlete	Event	Round of 16	Quarterfinals	Semifinals	Final	
Athlete	Event	Opposition Score	Opposition Score	Opposition Score	Opposition Score	Rank
Hendrik Tarigan	-60 kg	Alhajj (YEM); W 2-0	Saclag (PHI); L 0-2	Did not advance		

Women's Taolu
Athlete	Event	Qualification	Final	Total	Rank
Juwita Niza Wasni	Nandao/Nanquan	9.63	9.56	19.19	Gold medal
Ivana Ardelia Irmanto	Nandao/Nanquan	9.57	9.55	19.12	~~4~~ (bronze)
Lindswell	Taijiquan/Taijijian	9.69	9.68	19.37	Silver medal

Women's Sanda
Athlete	Event	Round of 16	Quarterfinals	Semifinals	Final	
Athlete	Event	Opposition Score	Opposition Score	Opposition Score	Opposition Score	Rank
Hertati	-52 kg	Mansoryansamiroumi (IRI); L 0-2	Did not advance			
