= Yeonhui-dong, Incheon =

Neighbourhood in Incheon, South Korea

Yeonhui-dong
- Neighbourhood
- Interactive map of Yeonhui-dong
- Country: South Korea
- Region: Sudogwon
- Provincial level: Incheon

Area
  - Total: 11.9 km^{2} (4.6 sq mi)

Population (January 1, 2012)
  - Total: 46,583
  - Density: 3,910/km^{2} (10,100/sq mi)
  - Dialect: Seoul
- Website: Yeonhui-dong

Korean name
- Hangul: 연희동
- Hanja: 連喜洞
- RR: Yeonhui-dong
- MR: Yŏnhŭi-dong

Yeonhui-dong (Korean: 연희동) is an administrative division and dong located in Seohae District Korea. Yeonhui-dong is a mixed rural and urban use area based on flower gardens and farming, and was formed for commerce with the native farming region of Gongcheon-dong.

== History ==
- 2000 Community Center built
- 1995 January 1 Name changed to Incheon Metropolitan City, Seo-gu, Yeonhui-dong
- 1988 January 1 Named change to Incheon Direct Controlled Municipality, Seo-gu, Yeonhui-dong
- 1981 Named changed to Incheon Direct Controlled Municipality, Buk-gu, Yeonhui-dong
- 1955 Gongchon-dong consolidated with Simgok-dong
- 1914 Bukcheon-gun, Seogot-myeon

== Administrative divisions ==
- Yeonhui-dong
- Gongchon-dong
- Simgok-dong

== Schools ==
- Incheon Seogot Elementary School
- Incheon Cheongra Elementary School
- Incheon Yangji Elementary School
- Simgok Elementary School
- Seogot Middle School
- Daein High School
- Incheon Design High School
