= Daein High School =

Boys high school in Incheon, South Korea

Coordinates: 37.5578°N 126.6784°E

Daein High School (Korean: 대인고등학교) is a private, general boys high-school located in Gongchon-dong, Seo District, Incheon, South Korea.

== School History ==
- August 16, 1989 School legally recognized as Daein High School, Foundation President Kim Byeong-Su appointed.
- October 23, 1989 Building construction started of Daein High School
- November 28, 1990 Name change to Daein General High School recognized (6 general grades, 6 business grades)
- March 2, 1991 First admissions (600 students)
- April 13, 1991 Celebration ceremony of school establishment
- August 20, 1991 School change of 6 general grades, 4 business-industrial grades, 2 information processing grades
- September 23, 1996 Name change to Daein High School recognized
- July 6, 2005 Selected as an English training activity-focused school, and construction of an exclusive English area completed
