= Pornchai Kaokaew =

Thai sepaktakraw player and army officer (born 1981)

Personal information
- Native name: พรชัย เค้าแก้ว
- Full name: Roi Tho Pornchai Kaokaew
- Nickname: Pui (ปุ้ย)
- National team: Thailand
- Born: 10 August 1981 (age 45) Khon Kaen, Thailand
- Height: 179 cm (5 ft 10 in)

Sport
- Sport: Sepak takraw
- Position: Striker (or killer/attacker)
- Retired: 2025
Medal record
Men's sepak takraw
Representing Thailand
Event	1st	2nd	3rd
Asian Games	10	0	0
SEA Games	18	1	1
Total	28	1	1
Asian Games
Gold medal – first place	2002 Busan	Regu
Gold medal – first place	2002 Busan	Team regu
Gold medal – first place	2006 Doha	Regu
Gold medal – first place	2006 Doha	Team regu
Gold medal – first place	2010 Guangzhou	Regu
Gold medal – first place	2010 Guangzhou	Team regu
Gold medal – first place	2014 Incheon	Regu
Gold medal – first place	2014 Incheon	Team regu
Gold medal – first place	2018 Jakarta–Palembang	Team doubles
Gold medal – first place	2018 Jakarta–Palembang	Team regu
SEA Games
Gold medal – first place	2003 Hanoi	Regu
Gold medal – first place	2003 Hanoi	Team regu
Gold medal – first place	2007 Nakhon Ratchasima	Regu
Gold medal – first place	2007 Nakhon Ratchasima	Team regu
Gold medal – first place	2009 Vientiane	Team regu
Gold medal – first place	2011 Palembang–Jakarta	Regu
Gold medal – first place	2011 Palembang–Jakarta	Team regu
Gold medal – first place	2013 Naypyidaw	Regu
Gold medal – first place	2013 Naypyidaw	Team regu
Gold medal – first place	2015 Singapore	Team doubles
Gold medal – first place	2015 Singapore	Team regu
Gold medal – first place	2017 Kuala Lumpur	Quadrant
Gold medal – first place	2017 Kuala Lumpur	Team doubles
Gold medal – first place	2017 Kuala Lumpur	Team regu
Gold medal – first place	2019 Philippines	Regu
Gold medal – first place	2019 Philippines	Team regu
Gold medal – first place	2021 Hanoi	Regu
Gold medal – first place	2021 Hanoi	Team regu
Silver medal – second place	2005 Manila	Regu
Bronze medal – third place	2005 Manila	Doubles

Pornchai Kaokaew (Thai: พรชัย เค้าแก้ว; born 10 August 1981) is a Thai former sepak takraw player, former soccer player, and current soldier of the army.

== Royal decorations ==
- 2009 – Commander (Third Class) of The Most Admirable Order of the Direkgunabhorn
- 2021 – Companion (Fourth Class) of The Most Noble Order of the Crown of Thailand
