= Brunei at the 2014 Asian Games =

- IOC code: BRU
- NOC: Brunei Darussalam National Olympic Council
- Website: www.bruneiolympic.org (in English)

in Incheon
- Competitors: 11 in 4 sports
- Medals Ranked 38th: Gold 0 Silver 0 Bronze 0 Total 0

Asian Games appearances (overview)
- 1990; 1994; 1998; 2002; 2006; 2010; 2014; 2018; 2022; 2026

Brunei participated in the 2014 Asian Games in Incheon, South Korea from 19 September to 4 October 2014. It did not win any medals.

== Fencing ==
Athlete	Event	Preliminaries	Round of 32	Round of 16	Quarterfinal	Semifinal	Final / BM	
Athlete	Event	Opposition Score	Opposition Score	Opposition Score	Opposition Score	Opposition Score	Opposition Score	Rank
Rzaul Asad	Individual Sabre	Yerali (KAZ); L 0–5 Konovalov Evgeniy (UZB); L 2–5; Junghwan (KOR); L 1–5; Yingming (CHN); L 0–5; An (VIE); L 2–5	did not advance					

== Sepaktakraw ==
=== Men's double regu ===
Team

Hadi Ariffin Bin Matali Abdul
Ang Ismail
Jamaludin Haji Marzi

Preliminary

Group B

Team	Pld	W	L	SF	SA	Pts
Myanmar	3	3	0	6	1	6
Laos	3	2	1	4	2	5
Indonesia	3	1	2	2	4	4
Brunei	3	0	3	1	6	3

Date		Score		Set 1	Set 2	Set 3
20 September	Myanmar	2–1	Brunei	21–18	21–23	21–17
20 September	Indonesia	2–0	Brunei	21–11	21–16	
21 September	Laos	2–0	Brunei	21–19	22–20	
