= Thailand at the 2014 Asian Games =

- IOC code: THA
- NOC: National Olympic Committee of Thailand
- Website: www.olympicthai.or.th/eng (in English and Thai)

in Incheon
- Competitors: 518 in 23 sports
- Flag bearer: Kawin Thammasatchanan
- Medals Ranked 6th: Gold 12 Silver 7 Bronze 28 Total 47

Asian Games appearances (overview)
- 1951; 1954; 1958; 1962; 1966; 1970; 1974; 1978; 1982; 1986; 1990; 1994; 1998; 2002; 2006; 2010; 2014; 2018; 2022; 2026

Thailand participated in the 2014 Asian Games in Incheon, South Korea from 19 September to 4 October 2014.

== Medal summary ==
=== Medals by sport ===
Medals by sport
Sport	Gold	Silver	Bronze	Total
Sepaktakraw	4	0	0	4
Cycling	2	0	0	2
Sailing	1	2	6	9
Taekwondo	1	1	4	6
Golf	1	1	2	4
Bowling	1	1	1	3
Tennis	1	1	1	3
Boxing	1	0	1	2
Volleyball – Beach	0	1	0	1
Shooting	0	0	3	3
Weightlifting	0	0	3	3
Rowing	0	0	2	2
Athletics	0	0	1	1
Judo	0	0	1	1
Kabaddi	0	0	1	1
Karate	0	0	1	1
Volleyball – Indoor	0	0	1	1
Total	12	7	28	47

=== Medalists ===
The following Thai competitors won medals at the games.

Medal	Name	Sport	Event	Date
Gold	Yannaphon Larp Apharat	Bowling	Men's Singles	23 Sep
Gold	Thai men's national sepaktakraw team: Anuwat Chaichana; Thanawat Chumsena; Somporn Jaisinghol; Pornchai Kaokaew; Sittipong Khamchan; Supachai Maneenat; Suriyan Peachan; Siriwat Sakha; Sahachat Sakhoncharoen; Kritsana Tanakorn; Assadin Wongyota; Pattarapong Yapadee	Sepaktakraw	Men's Team	28 Sep
Gold	Thai women's national sepaktakraw team: Nattiya Chantavet; Wiphada Chitphuan; Masaya Duangsri; Wanwisa Jankaen; Sasiwimol Janthasit; Fueangfa Praphatsarang; Somruedee Pruepruk; Kaewjai Pumsawangkaew; Sunthari Rupsung; Priyapat Saton; Payom Srihongsa; Rungtip Tanaking	Sepaktakraw	Women's Team	28 Sep
Gold	Benyapa Niphatsophon; Supamas Sangchan; Budsabakorn Sukapan	Golf	Women's Team	28 Sep
Gold	Jutatip Maneephan	Cycling – Road	Women's Road Race	29 Sep
Gold	Luksika Kumkhum; Tamarine Tanasugarn	Tennis	Women's Doubles	29 Sep
Gold	Noppakao Poonpat, Nichapa Waiwai	Sailing	29er – Women's Two Person Dinghy	30 Sep
Gold	Chanatip Sonkham	Taekwondo	Women's Flyweight (−49 kg)	30 Sep
Gold	Amanda Carr	Cycling – BMX	Women BMX	1 Oct
Gold	Masaya Duangsri; Wanwisa Jankaen; Fueangfa Praphatsarang; Sunthari Rupsung; Payom Srihongsa	Sepaktakraw	Women's Regu	3 Oct
Gold	Anuwat Chaichana; Pornchai Kaokaew; Sittipong Khamchan; Siriwat Sakha; Pattarapong Yapadee	Sepaktakraw	Men's Regu	3 Oct
Gold	Wuttichai Masuk	Boxing	Men's Light Welter (64kg)	3 Oct
Silver	Varapatsorn Radarong; Tanarattha Udomchavee	Volleyball - Beach	Women's Team	28 Sep
Silver	Budsabakorn Sukapan	Golf	Women's individual	28 Sep
Silver	Yannaphon Larp Apharat	Bowling	Men's All Events	30 Sep
Silver	Damrongsak Vongtim, Kitsada Vongtim	Sailing	Hobie-16 - Open Multihull	30 Sep
Silver	Natthaphong Phonoppharat	Sailing	Mistral – Men's Windsurfer	30 Sep
Silver	Luksika Kumkhum	Tennis	Women's Singles	30 Sep
Silver	Akkarin Kitwijarn	Taekwondo	Bantamweight (−63 kg)	2 Oct
Bronze	Rattikan Gulnoi	Weightlifting	Women's 58kg	22 Sep
Bronze	Thonthan Satjadet	Judo	Women's +78 kg	22 Sep
Bronze	Chattaya Kitcharoen	Shooting	Trap Women's	23 Sep
Bronze	Sithiphol Kunaksorn	Bowling	Men's Singles	23 Sep
Bronze	Chatuphum Chinnawong	Weightlifting	Men's 77kg	23 Sep
Bronze	Rojjana Raklao; Phuttharaksa Neegree	Rowing	Women's Double Sculls	24 Sep
Bronze	Rojjana Raklao; Phuttharaksa Neegree	Rowing	Lightweight Women's Double Sculls	25 Sep
Bronze	Chitchanok Pulsabsakul	Weightlifting	Women's +75kg	26 Sep
Bronze	Isarapa Imprasertsuk; Sutiya Jiewchaloemmit; Nutchaya Sutarporn	Shooting	Skeet Women's Team	27 Sep
Bronze	Sutiya Jiewchaloemmit	Shooting	Skeet Women's	27 Sep
Bronze	Sanchai Ratiwatana; Sonchat Ratiwatana	Tennis	Men's Doubles	28 Sep
Bronze	Supamas Sangchan	Golf	Women's individual	28 Sep
Bronze	Danthai Boonma; Kasidit Lepkurte; Tawan Phongphun; Natipong Srithong	Golf	Men's Team	28 Sep
Bronze	Jamras Rittidet	Athletics	Men's 110m Hurdles	30 Sep
Bronze	Ek Boonsawad	Sailing	RS:X – Men's Windsurfer	30 Sep
Bronze	Suthon Yampinid	Sailing	Optimist – Men's One Person Dinghy	30 Sep
Bronze	Siripon Kaewduang-ngam	Sailing	RS:One – Women's Windsurfer	30 Sep
Bronze	Sarocha Prumrai	Sailing	RS:X – Women's Windsurfer	30 Sep
Bronze	Kamolwan Chanyim	Sailing	Laser Radial – Women's One Person Dinghy	30 Sep
Bronze	Kamonchanok Klahan	Sailing	Optimist – Women's One Person Dinghy	30 Sep
Bronze	Nattapat Tantramart	Taekwondo	Men's Middleweight (−87 kg)	30 Sep
Bronze	Panipak Wongpattanakit	Taekwondo	Women's Finweight (−46 kg)	1 Oct
Bronze	Rangsiya Nisaisom	Taekwondo	Women's Featherweight (−57 kg)	1 Oct
Bronze	Thai women's national kabaddi team: Chonlada Chaiprapan; Sai Jaemjaroen; Wattakan Kammachot; Namfon Kangkeeree; Naleerat Ketsaro; Alisa Limsamran; Nuchanart Maiwan; Nantharat Nantakitkosol; Atchara Puangngern; Rattana Rueangkoet; Kamontip Suwanchana; Alisa Thongsook	Kabaddi	Women's Team	2 Oct
Bronze	Thai women's national volleyball team: Piyanut Pannoy; Em-orn Phanusit; Thatdao Nuekjang; Pleumjit Thinkaow; Onuma Sittirak; Khatthalee Pinsuwan; Wilavan Apinyapong; Tapaphaipun Chaisri; Nootsara Tomkom; Malika Kanthong; Kaewkalaya Kamulthala; Parinya Pankaew	Volleyball - Indoor	Women's Team	2 Oct
Bronze	Apichet Saensit	Boxing	Men's Welter (69kg)	2 Oct
Bronze	Songvut Amuntaen	Karate	Men's -75kg	2 Oct
Bronze	Ramnarong Sawekwiharee	Taekwondo	Men's Finweight (−54 kg)	3 Oct

Medals by date
Day	Date	1st place, gold medalist(s)	2nd place, silver medalist(s)	3rd place, bronze medalist(s)	Total
1	20 Sep	0	0	0	0
2	21 Sep	0	0	0	0
3	22 Sep	0	0	2	2
4	23 Sep	1	0	3	4
5	24 Sep	0	0	1	1
6	25 Sep	0	0	1	1
7	26 Sep	0	0	1	1
8	27 Sep	0	0	2	2
9	28 Sep	3	2	3	8
10	29 Sep	2	0	0	2
11	30 Sep	2	4	8	14
12	1 Oct	1	0	2	3
13	2 Oct	0	1	4	5
14	3 Oct	3	0	1	4
15	4 Oct	0	0	0	0
Total		12	7	28	47

== Archery ==
Men

Athlete	Event	Ranking round		First Round	Round of 32	Round of 16	Quarterfinals	Semifinals	Final	
Athlete	Event	Score	Seed	Opposition Score	Opposition Score	Opposition Score	Opposition Score	Opposition Score	Opposition Score	Rank
Denchai Thepna	Individual compound	688	20	Bye	Nguyen (VIE); L 137-139	did not advance				
Khomkrit Duangsuwan	Individual recurve	1251	40	Nurmanbetov (KGZ); W 6-0	Gu (CHN); L 2-6	did not advance				
Itsarin Thaiuea	Individual recurve	1192	51	did not advance						
Witthaya Thamwong	Individual recurve	1276	33	Bye	Talukdar (IND); L 0-6	did not advance				
Khomkrit Duangsuwan; Itsarin Thaiuea; Witthaya Thamwong	Team recurve	3719	12			China (CHN); L 6-0	did not advance			

== Badminton ==
Men

Athlete	Event	Round of 32	Round of 16	Quarterfinals	Semifinals	Final	
Athlete	Event	Opposition Score	Opposition Score	Opposition Score	Opposition Score	Opposition Score	Rank
Boonsak Ponsana (8)	Singles	Nguyen (VIE); L 0-2	did not advance				
Tanongsak Saensomboonsuk	Singles	Momota (JPN); L 0-2	did not advance				
Maneepong Jongjit; Nipitphon PhuangPhuapet (8)	Doubles	Iek and Lou (MAC); W 2-0	Sonoda and Kamura (JPN); L 1-2	did not advance			
Wannawat Ampunsuwan; Patiphat Chalardchalaem	Doubles	Shaheem and Rasheed (MDV); W 2-0	Goh and Tan (MAS); L 1-2	did not advance			
Boonsak Ponsana; Tanongsak Saensomboonsuk; Sitthikom Thammasin; Maneepong Jongjit; Nipitphon PhuangPhuapet; Wannawat Ampunsuwan; Sudket Prapakamol	Team		Chinese Taipei (TPE); L 0-3	did not advance			

Women

Athlete	Event	Round of 32	Round of 16	Quarterfinals	Semifinals	Final	
Athlete	Event	Opposition Score	Opposition Score	Opposition Score	Opposition Score	Opposition Score	Rank
Ratchanok Intanon (4)	Singles	Vu (VIE); W 2-0	Bashir (PAK); W 2-0	Bae (KOR) (5); L 1-2	did not advance		
Nichaon Jindapon	Singles	Shahzad (PAK); W 2-0	Tai (TPE) (7); L 0-2	did not advance			
Duanganong Aroonkesorn; Kunchala Voravichitchaikul (8)	Doubles		Munkhbayar and Baatar (MGL); W 2-0	Takahashi and Matsutomo (JPN)(1); L 0-2	did not advance		
Sapsiree Taerattanachai; Puttita Supajirakul	Doubles		Kim and Jung (KOR)(6); L 0-2	did not advance			
Ratchanok Intanon; Porntip Buranaprasertsuk; Busanan Ongbumrungphan; Kunchala Voravichitchaikul; Sapsiree Taerattanachai; Saralee Thoungthongkam	Team		Bye	India (IND); L 2-3	did not advance		

Mixed

Athlete	Event	Round of 32	Round of 16	Quarterfinals	Semifinals	Final	
Athlete	Event	Opposition Score	Opposition Score	Opposition Score	Opposition Score	Opposition Score	Rank
Sudket Prapakamol; Saralee Thoungthongkam (5)	Doubles	Do and Le (VIE); W 2-0	Chen and Cheng (TPE); W 2-0	Zhang and Zhao (CHN) (1); L 0-2	did not advance		
Maneepong Jongjit; Sapsiree Taerattanachai (8)	Doubles	Jargalsaikhan and Baatar (MGL); W 2-0	Shin and Jang (KOR); L 1-2	did not advance			

== Boxing ==
Men

Athlete	Event	Round of 32	Round of 16	Quarterfinals	Semifinals	Final	
Athlete	Event	Opposition Result	Opposition Result	Opposition Result	Opposition Result	Opposition Result	Rank
Tanes Ongjunta	Light flyweight 49 kg	Bye	Gankhuyag (MGL); L 0-3	did not advance			
Chatchai Butdee	Flyweight; 52 kg	Suleimenov (KAZ); L 0-3	did not advance				
Donchai Thathi	Bantamweight; 56 kg	Fernandez (PHI); L 0-3	did not advance				
Saylom Ardee	Lightweight; 60 kg	Golara (IRI); W 2-1	Han (KOR); L 0-3	did not advance			
Wuttichai Masuk	Light welterweight 64 kg	Bye	Thapa (NEP); W 3-0	Turdiev (UZB); W 2-1	Bebitov (TKM); W 3-0	Lim (KOR); W 2-1	1st place, gold medalist(s)
Apichet Saensit	Welterweight; 69 kg	Bye	da Silva (TLS); W TKO	Jangra (IND); W 3-0	Madrimov (UZB); L 0-3	did not advance	3rd place, bronze medalist(s)
Anavat Thongkrathok	Light heavyweight 81 kg		Kuldep (IND); L 1-2	did not advance			

Women

Athlete	Event	Round of 16	Quarterfinals	Semifinals	Final	
Athlete	Event	Opposition Result	Opposition Result	Opposition Result	Opposition Result	Rank
Sopida Satumrum	Flyweight; 51 kg	Si (CHN); L 1-2	did not advance			
Tassamalee Thongjan	Lightweight; 60 kg	Yin (CHN); L 0-3	did not advance			

== Taekwondo ==
Men

Athlete	Event	Round of 32	Round of 16	Quarterfinals	Semifinals	Final	
Athlete	Event	Opposition Result	Opposition Result	Opposition Result	Opposition Result	Opposition Result	Rank
Ramnarong Sawekwiharee	−54 kg	Prasbowo (INA); W 15-8	Sheraliev (UZB); W 13-8	Murataliev (KGZ); W 19-6	Huang (TPE); L 5-8	did not advance	3rd place, bronze medalist(s)
Akkarin Kitwijarn	−63 kg	Phimmasone (LAO); W 13-1	El Hayek (LIB); W 12-2	Le (VIE); W 4-1	Chen (TPE); W 5-2	Lee (KOR); L 2-18	2nd place, silver medalist(s)
Chetrapee Tangjai	−68 kg	Tashanov (KGZ); W 24-6	Thammavong (LAO); W 13-1	Sembrano (PHI); L 9-12	did not advance		
Peerathep Silaon	−74 kg	Wang (CHN); W 12-7	Saad (QAT); W 12-8	Rafalovich (UZB); L 1-13	did not advance		
Nattapat Tantramart	−87 kg		Bye	Abdrambek (KAZ); W 10-1	Chen (CHN); L 9-11	did not advance	3rd place, bronze medalist(s)

Women

Athlete	Event	Round of 32	Round of 16	Quarterfinals	Semifinals	Final	
Athlete	Event	Opposition Result	Opposition Result	Opposition Result	Opposition Result	Opposition Result	Rank
Panipak Wongpattanakit	−46 kg		Truong (VIE); W 9-3	Boudsingkhone (LAO); W 16-0	Lin (TPE); L 4-5	did not advance	3rd place, bronze medalist(s)
Chanatip Sonkham	−49 kg		Saparbek (KAZ); W 11-2	Park (KOR); W 9-6	Sun (TPE); W 4-3	Li (CHN); W 10-3	1st place, gold medalist(s)
Sarita Phongsri	−53 kg		Cham (PHI); W 12-0	Hajipourgoli (IRI); L 6-7	did not advance		
Rangsiya Nisaisom	−57 kg	Bye	Tarman (JOR); W 3-1	Saydullaeva (UZB); W 6-2	Lee (KOR); L 1-5	did not advance	3rd place, bronze medalist(s)

== Tennis ==
Men

Athlete	Event	First Round	Round of 32	Round of 16	Quarterfinals	Semifinals	Final	
Athlete	Event	Opposition Score	Opposition Score	Opposition Score	Opposition Score	Opposition Score	Opposition Score	Rank
Danai Udomchoke (9)	Singles	Bye	Kotliarevskii (KGZ); W 6-0, 6-1	Zhang (CHN) (7); W 7-5, 3-6, 6-3	Bhambri (IND) (4); L 3-6,2-6	did not advance		
Pruchya Isaro (14)	Singles	Bye	Mammetgulyyev (TKM); W 6-2, 6-3	Lu (TPE) (1); L 0-6, 3-6	did not advance			
Sanchai Ratiwatana; Sonchat Ratiwatana (1)	Doubles		Bye	Zayed and Al Mutawa (QAT); W 6-0, 6-0	Gong and Li (CHN) (6); W 7–6^{(4)}, 7-5	Myneni and Singh (IND) (5); L 6-4, 3-6, [6]-[10]	did not advance	3rd place, bronze medalist(s)
Pruchya Isaro; Nuttanon Kadchapanan (7)	Doubles		Kotliarevskii and Duldaev (KGZ); W w/o	Wang and Lee (TPE); L 2-6, 1-6	did not advance			
Danai Udomchoke; Pruchya Isaro; Sanchai Ratiwatana; Sonchat Ratiwatana (8)	Team		Bye	Indonesia (INA); W 3-0	Japan (JPN) (4); L 1-2	did not advance		

Women

Athlete	Event	First Round	Round of 32	Round of 16	Quarterfinals	Semifinals	Final	
Athlete	Event	Opposition Score	Opposition Score	Opposition Score	Opposition Score	Opposition Score	Opposition Score	Rank
Luksika Kumkhum (1)	Singles	Bye	Al-Olfi (YEM); W 6-1, 6-0	Lee (KOR) (14); W 6-1, 6-1	Hsu (TPE) (10); W 6-0, 6-2	Hozumi (JPN) (6); W 6-4, 6-2	Wang (CHN) (2); L 3-6, 6^{(5)}-7	2nd place, silver medalist(s)
Noppawan Lertcheewakarn (9)	Singles	Bye	Palha (IND); W 7-5, 6-3	Zhang (HKG) (8); L 2-6, 1-6	did not advance			
Peangtarn Plipuech; Nicha Lertpitaksinchai (4)	Doubles		Bye	Al-Balushi and Al-Nabhani (OMA); W 6-1, 6-1	Mirza and Thombare (IND) (5); L 1-6, 6^{(4)}-7	did not advance		
Luksika Kumkhum; Tamarine Tanasugarn (7)	Doubles		Bye	Chong and Zhang (HKG); W 6-4, 6-4	Aoyama and Hozumi (JPN) (3); W 1-6, 6-2, [10]-[8]	C Hao-ching and C Yung-jan (TPE) (1); W 6-4, 6-4	C Chin-wei and Hsieh (TPE) (2); W 7-5, 3-6, [10]-[3]	1st place, gold medalist(s)
Luksika Kumkhum; Tamarine Tanasugarn; Noppawan Lertcheewakarn; Varatchaya Wongteanchai (4)	Team			Uzbekistan (UZB); W 2-1	Chinese Taipei (TPE); L 1-2	did not advance		

Mixed

Athlete	Event	Round of 32	Round of 16	Quarterfinals	Semifinals	Final	
Athlete	Event	Opposition Score	Opposition Score	Opposition Score	Opposition Score	Opposition Score	Rank
Sanchai Ratiwatana; Peangtarn Plipuech (3)	Doubles	Bye	Gonzales and Lehnert (PHI); W 6-3, 4-6, [11]-[9]	Sugita and Aoyama (JPN) (6); L 6-4, 3-6, [10]-[12]	did not advance		
Danai Udomchoke; Tamarine Tanasugarn (5)	Doubles	Bye	Huey and Dy (PHI); W 6-3, 6-4	Zhang and Zheng (CHN) (4); L 6-4, 2-6, [11]-[13]	did not advance		
