= Myanmar at the 2014 Asian Games =

- IOC code: MYA
- NOC: Myanmar Olympic Committee

in Incheon
- Medals Ranked 20th: Gold 2 Silver 1 Bronze 1 Total 4

Asian Games appearances (overview)
- 1951; 1954; 1958; 1962; 1966; 1970; 1974; 1978; 1982; 1986; 1990; 1994; 1998; 2002; 2006; 2010; 2014; 2018; 2022; 2026

Myanmar participated in the 2014 Asian Games in Incheon, South Korea from 19 September to 4 October 2014.

== Medalists ==
Medal	Name	Sport	Event	Date
Gold	Zaw Zaw Aung; Zaw Lat; Wai Lin Aung	Sepaktakraw	Men's Double Regu	22 September
Gold	Kyu Kyu Thin; Phyu Phyu Than; Khin Hnin Wai	Sepaktakraw	Women's Double Regu	22 September
Silver	Myanmar Sepaktakraw Women's Team	Sepaktakraw	Women's Team	28 September
Bronze	Aung Pyae Tun; Htoo Aung Kyaw; Kyaw Soe Win; Naing Lin Aung; Zaw Zaw Aung	Sepaktakraw	Men's Regu	2 October

== Shooting ==
- Ye Tun Naung
