= 2014 Asian Games =

Multi-sport event in Incheon, South Korea

Coordinates: 37°58′N 124°39′E

XVII Asian Games
- Host city: Incheon, South Korea
- Motto: Diversity Shines Here (Korean: 평화의 숨결, 아시아의 미래, romanized: Pyeonghwaui sumgyeol, asiaui mirae, Hanja: 平和의 숨결, 아시아의 未來)
- Nations: 45
- Athletes: 9,501
- Events: 439 in 36 sports (50 disciplines)
- Opening: 19 September 2014
- Closing: 4 October 2014
- Opened by: Park Geun-hye; President of South Korea
- Closed by: Ahmad Al-Fahad Al-Sabah; President of the Olympic Council of Asia
- Athlete's Oath: Oh Jin-hyek; Nam Hyun-hee
- Judge's Oath: Kim Hong-lae; Shu Hea-jung
- Torch lighter: Lee Young-ae
- Main venue: Incheon Asiad Main Stadium
- Website: incheon2014ag.org (archived)

Summer

Winter

The 2014 Asian Games, officially known as the XVII Asian Games (제17회 아시아 경기대회) and also known as Incheon 2014, were a pan-Asian multi-sport event held from 19 September to 4 October 2014 in Incheon, South Korea.

On 17 April 2007, Incheon was awarded the right to host the games, defeating Delhi, India and was the third city in South Korea after Seoul (1986) and Busan (2002). The games were held from 19 September to 4 October 2014, although several pre-competitive events began between 14 and 19 September 2014. Approximately 9,501 athletes participated in the event which featured 439 events in 36 sports. It was opened by the President of South Korea, Park Geun-hye at the Incheon Asiad Main Stadium.

The final medal tally was led by China, followed by the host South Korea and Japan, while Cambodia won its first-ever Asian Games gold medal. During the games, 14 world and 27 Asian records were broken. Japanese swimmer Kosuke Hagino was announced as the most valuable player (MVP) of the Games. Though there were several controversies, the Games were deemed generally successful with their low hosting cost and with the rising standard of competition amongst the Asian nations.

== Bidding process ==
New Delhi and Incheon submitted their formal bid by the official deadline, 30 June 2005. A 5-member evaluation committee of the Olympic Council of Asia, headed by then vice-president of the association Celso Dayrit inspected New Delhi from 9 to 11 November 2006 and Incheon from 12 to 14 November 2006.

2014 Asian Games bidding results
City	NOC	Round 1
Incheon	South Korea	32
New Delhi	India	13

The vote was held on 17 April 2007 in Kuwait City, Kuwait during the 26th Olympic Council of Asia (OCA) General Assembly. During the final presentation before voting, Incheon made a new offer, raising US$20 million in funds to support countries that had yet to win a medal in the Games. It also offered free flight tickets and accommodation to all participants; India, however, made no changes to its offer. All 45 members voted, with voting held in secret ballot. Later that day, it was announced that Incheon won the rights. Though the vote results were not released, it was revealed that Incheon won by 32 to 13.

It was widely felt that Delhi's lack of enthusiasm to host the event was the primary reason for its loss. Then Union Sports Minister of India, Mani Shankar Aiyar, spoke strongly against Delhi hosting the games, arguing that the money allocated by India's government to the sporting event would be better spent on building facilities for the poor. The Indian Olympic Association (IOA) president said that India's Sports Minister's remarks against hosting the Games was the main reason for New Delhi's loss. The IOA delegation added that the evaluation committee was concerned about pollution and traffic in Delhi. Delhi's offer of US$2 million to each team for games support against Incheon's offer of US$20 million to all 45 nations participating in the event could also have contributed to the defeat. Unlike Delhi, Incheon emphasized the high-tech facilities that would be available to the athletes.

== Development and preparations ==
=== Costs ===
The cost of the Games was estimated at US$1.62 billion, with the Korean government and Incheon government covering 19% and 78.9% respectively. Of the total budget, some US$1.39 billion was used for construction of venues and infrastructure, while approximately US$11 million covered the building and maintenance of training grounds. Around US$103 million was allocated for road and transportation projects.

A report in April 2012, however, suggested the city was under financial pressure from increasing debt.

The Incheon Asian Games Organising Committee (IAGOC) saved US$34 million after agreeing to reduce from 15,000 to 2,025 athletes to be provided free transportation and accommodation.

=== Volunteers ===
The volunteer program of Incheon 2014 Asian Games began on 1 November 2013 with a target to recruit 13,500 volunteers. As of 16 March 2014, 25,827 applications were received and 21,237 applicants were selected for training.

=== Torch relay ===
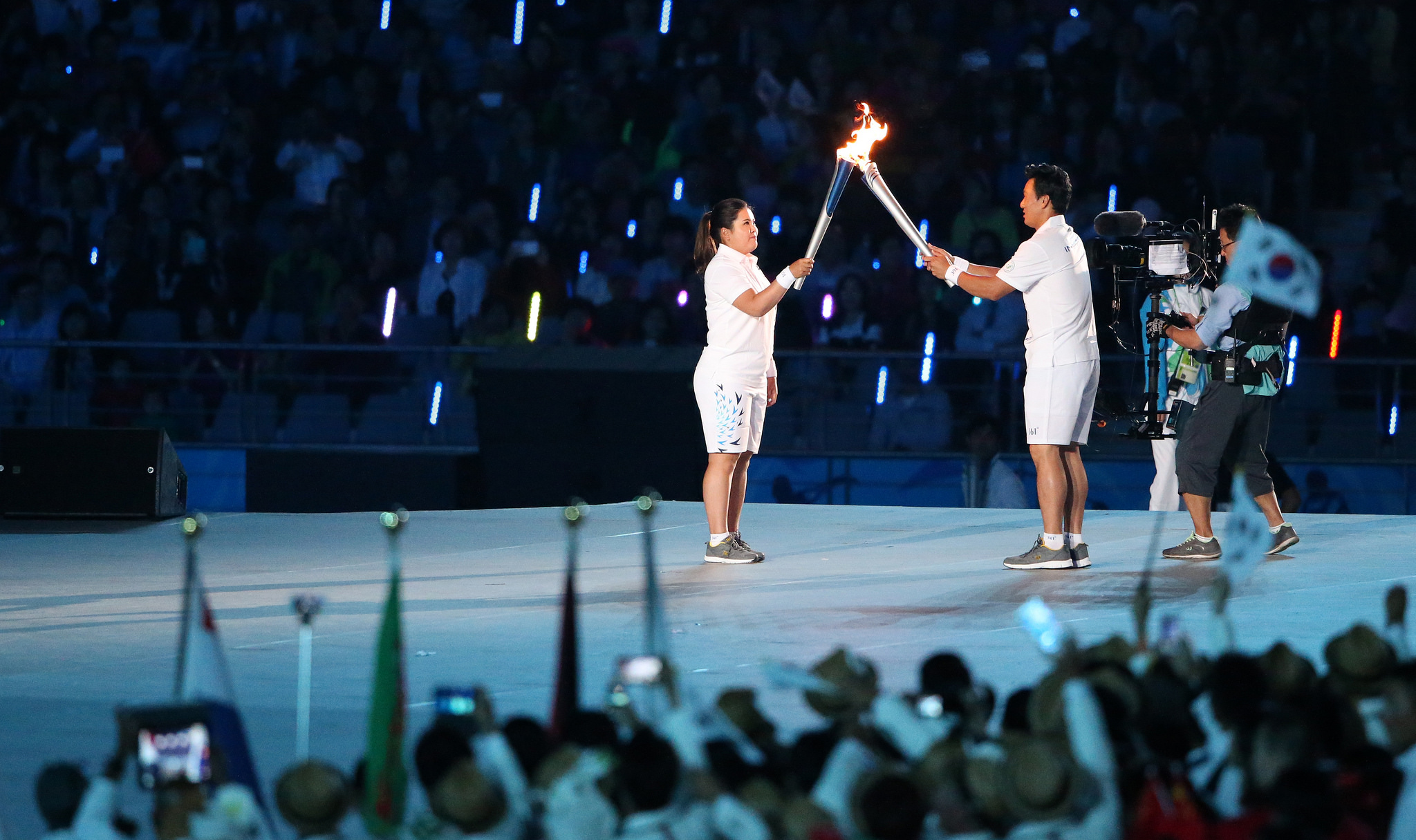
The torch relay during the opening ceremony. South Korean athletes Inbee Park move the fire to Lee Seung-yuop

The torch was revealed in October 2013, with a design motif based on the Crane, the official bird of Incheon Metropolitan City. The torch's blue internal cylinder signified the sky and the ocean of Incheon. Another four colors (green, yellow, red, violet) were intended to represent the five regions of Asia.

The torch was lit at Dhyan Chand National Stadium in New Delhi, India on August 9, 2014. This marked the first time the torch had been lit outside the host country, and that Weihai, a city in Shandong Province of the People's Republic of China, had hosted the relay, on August 12, 2014.

The domestic lighting ceremony was held at Manisan on Ganghwa Island on August 12, 2014. The domestic relay begin August 13, 2014 and traveled through 70 cities for 5,700 km. to reach the opening ceremony.

=== Marketing ===
==== Emblem ====
The official emblem was also revealed on the lighting ceremony, representing a wing configuration of the letter "A", for "Asia", with a shining sun at its upper left, symbolizing the Asian people holding hands in the sky.

==== Mascot ====
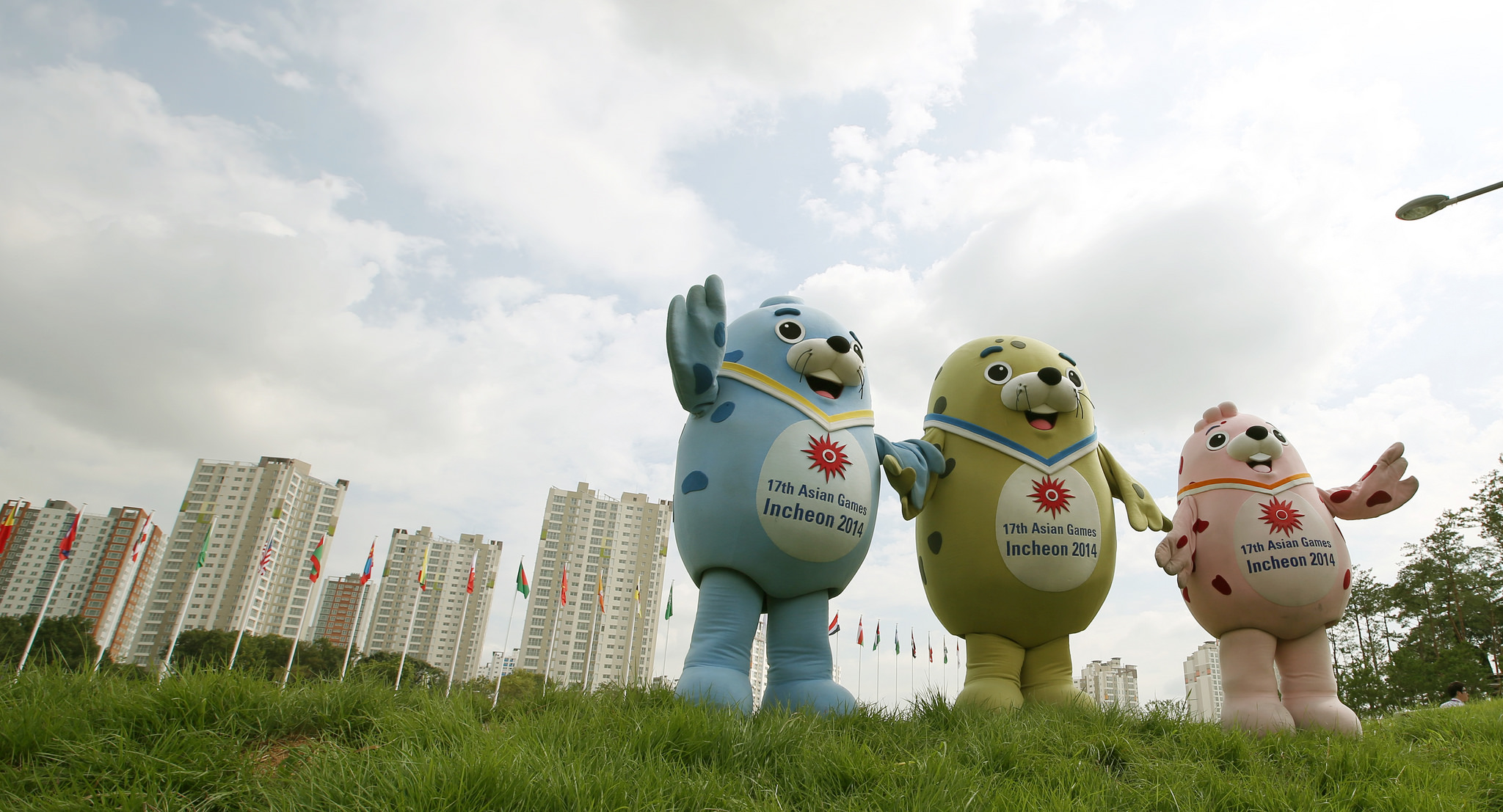
The Spotted Seals, the Games' mascots. Named from left to right: Barame, Vichuon, and Chumuro. The mascot statues at the Incheon Asiad Park.

The image of the mascots.

On November 4, 2010, three Spotted seal siblings were unveiled as the official mascots of the Games in Songdo Island, Incheon. The three seals, known as "Barame (바라메)", "Chumuro (추므로)" and "Vichuon (비추온)", meaning wind, dance and light in Korean, were chosen under the theme of the main venue. The prototype was taken from Baengnyeongdo. According to the organizers, the mascots were chosen to symbolise the future peace between South Korea and North Korea. Vichuon is the eldest of the three siblings, Barame is the second eldest, while Chumuro is the youngest and the only girl among the three siblings.

==== Medals ====
The medal design was approved by OCA on August 19, 2013. It features a pentagon-shaped symbol representing the five ports of Incheon — Airport, Seaport, Teleport, Leisureport, and Businessport, with the emblem of the Games inside. It symbolises the city as the hub of Northeast Asia.

==== Motto ====
Unveiled on September 16, 2010, "Diversity Shines Here" was the official English motto of the Games, celebrating the significance of Asia's wonderful diversity in history, cultures, and religions. The official slogan in Korean, "평화의 숨결, 아시아의 미래" (RR: Pyeonghwaui sumgyeol, asiaui mirae), literally means "Breath of Peace, Future of Asia".

==== Promotion ====
The six official posters for the Incheon Asian Games were released on March 31, 2011. The design represents the 28 Olympic sports categorized into five groups: racquet sports, ball sports, water sports, athletic sports and weight class. In various ways, the values and philosophy of the 17th Asian Games is represented in these posters.

==== Merchandising ====
Organisers began selling merchandise in July 2012. IB Worldwide was the exclusive online merchandiser of the event's licensed products.

==== Music ====
The official album was released by Universal Music on June 20, 2014, which featured "Only One", performed by JYJ as the Games' official theme song.

=== Venues ===
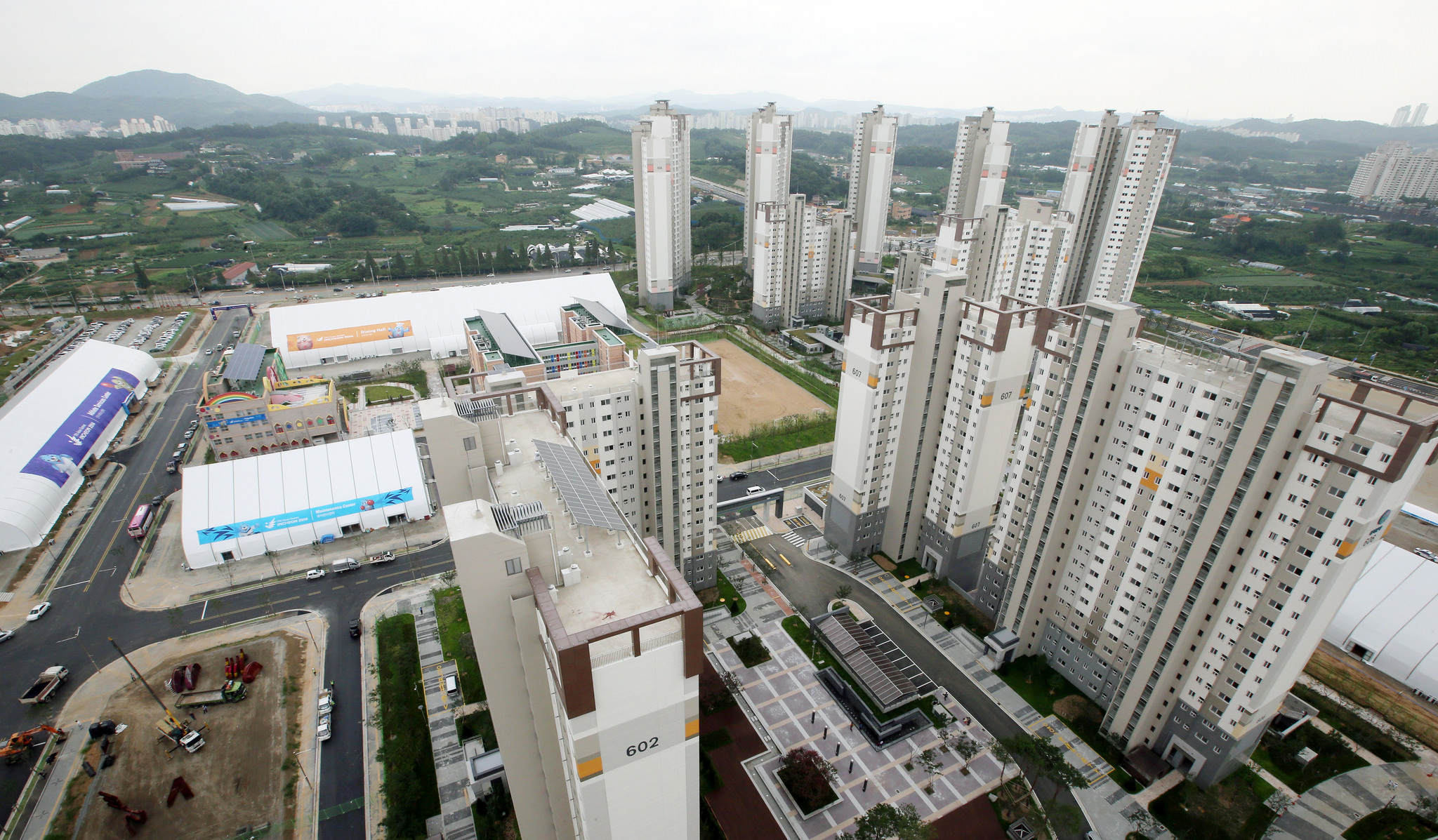
Aerial view of the Incheon Asiad Park in July 2014

The Games had 49 competition venues and 48 training facilities. Among the competition venues, ten were in six cities of Gyeonggi Province while another two were in Chungju and Seoul. The rest of the venues were in eight districts and a county inside metropolitan Incheon. Ten venues were constructed for the Games. The Games also provided over 3,300 units and 9,560 rooms for athletes and media personnel.

The main stadium, known as Incheon Asiad Main Stadium, had a seating capacity of 61,074 seats, with 30,000 seats variable after the Games. The US$400 million stadium, originally planned for 70,000 seats, was designed by Populous, which had designed several event venues around the world, including the Olympic Stadium of the 2012 Summer Olympics. The groundbreaking ceremony was held on June 28, 2011, in Yeonhui-dong. Construction began in June 2011 and finished in July 2014.

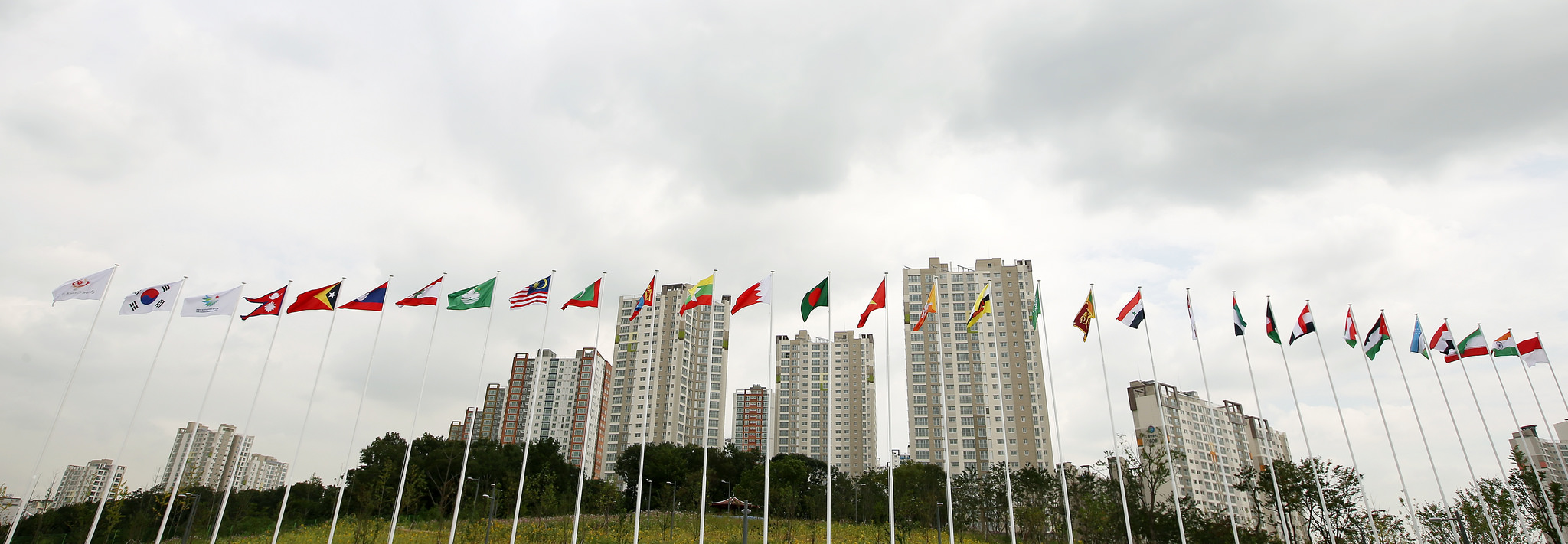
Flags at Asiad Park.

An athletes' village was built at Guwol, Namdong District, which had 2,220 units in 22 apartment buildings to accommodate around 14,500 athletes and officials.

=== Transport ===
Incheon Subway's construction period was shortened from a planned 2018 completion. Due to the increasing popularity of Incheon International Airport during the Games, immigration procedures were improved for passenger convenience.

== The Games ==
=== Opening ceremony ===
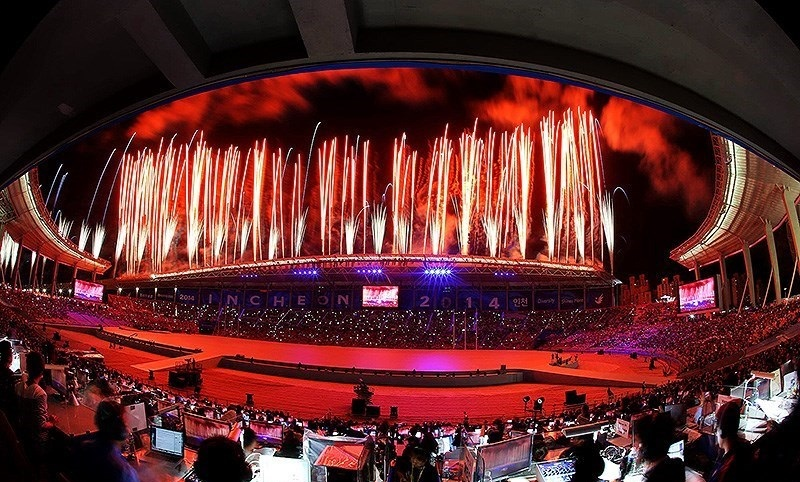
Opening ceremony

The opening ceremony began on September 19, 2014, at 18:00 local time. The performance was directed by film director Im Kwon-taek with playwright and actor Jang Jin, entertainer Kim Seong-ju and KBS host Yun Su-yeong as voiceovers of the ceremony. It was attended by President of South Korea Park Geun-hye who opened the games, President of International Olympic Committee Thomas Bach, Tokyo Governor Yōichi Masuzoe and also Incheon Mayor Yoo Jeong-bok.

Actors Jang Dong-gun and Kim Soo-hyun led the performance, consisting of four acts: "Asia long time ago", "Asia meeting through the sea", "Asia as family and friends", and "Asia as one and future joining with today", displaying the Korean past and future with digital technology. Other performers included Chinese pianist Lang Lang, the soprano diva Sumi Jo, along the k-pop stars JYJ, Exo, and Psy, who wrapped up the ceremony with a performance of his world hit song Gangnam Style.

Unlike in the 2002 Asian Games opening ceremony, South Korea as host marched separately from neighbor North Korea in the parade of nations.

=== Sports ===
The 2014 Asian Games featured 28 Olympic sports that would be contested at the 2016 Summer Olympics. In addition, eight non-Olympic sports were featured: baseball, ten-pin bowling, cricket, kabaddi, karate, sepak takraw, squash and wushu. The list was finalised on December 9, 2010, at the OCA's executive board meeting in Muscat, Oman. This resulted in dropping six other sports: roller sport, board games (chess, go, xiangqi), cue sports, softball, dancesport and dragon boat, which had been held in previous Games being dropped from the list. The list was approved on July 13, 2011, during the 30th annual general assembly in Tokyo as softball was incorporated with baseball as one sport while soft tennis came under the discipline of tennis. For the first time compound archery, mixed relay triathlon, and judo team events were introduced.

Changes to the non-Olympic sports featured at the Asian Games were influenced by discussions with organizers, who suggested cricket's removal from the program, as they felt too few countries played it and that they lacked the infrastructure to host it. The OCA disputed the proposed removal of cricket, however, noting its popularity and viewer interest.

2014 Asian Games Sports Programme
- Aquatics
  - Diving
  - Swimming
  - Synchronized swimming
  - Water polo
- Archery
- Athletics
- Badminton
- Baseball
  - Baseball
  - Softball
- Basketball
- Bowling
- Boxing
- Canoeing
  - Slalom
  - Sprint
- Cricket
- Cycling
  - BMX
  - Mountain Bike
  - Road
  - Track
- Equestrian
  - Dressage
  - Eventing
  - Jumping
- Fencing
- Field hockey
- Football
- Golf
- Gymnastics
  - Artistic
  - Rhythmic
  - Trampoline
- Handball
- Judo
- Kabaddi
- Karate
- Modern pentathlon
- Rowing
- Rugby sevens
- Sailing
- Sepak takraw
- Shooting
- Squash
- Table tennis
- Taekwondo
- Tennis
  - Tennis
  - Soft tennis
- Triathlon
- Volleyball
  - Beach volleyball
  - Volleyball
- Weightlifting
- Wrestling
- Wushu

=== Participating National Olympic Committees ===
All 45 members of the Olympic Council of Asia participated, including North Korea, which initially threatened to boycott the Games after disputes with South Korea over administrative issues about its delegation of athletes and officials. Saudi Arabia was the sole NOC to not send female athletes to the Games.

Below is a list of all the participating NOCs; the number of competitors per delegation is indicated in brackets.

Participating National Olympic Committees
- Afghanistan (69)
- Bahrain (69)
- Bangladesh (136)
- Bhutan (16)
- Brunei (11)
- Cambodia (20)
- China (894)
- Chinese Taipei (420)
- Timor-Leste (33)
- Hong Kong (476)
- India (515)
- Indonesia (186)
- Iran (282)
- Iraq (63)
- Japan (718)
- Jordan (97)
- Kazakhstan (415)
- North Korea (150)
- South Korea (833)(hosts)
- Kuwait (258)
- Kyrgyzstan (117)
- Laos (102)
- Lebanon (41)
- Macau (135)
- Malaysia (277)
- Maldives (142)
- Mongolia (234)
- Myanmar (64)
- Nepal (203)
- Oman (93)
- Pakistan (188)
- Palestine (56)
- Philippines (150)
- Qatar (251)
- Saudi Arabia (202)
- Singapore (230)
- Sri Lanka (80)
- Syria (30)
- Tajikistan (92)
- Thailand (518)
- Turkmenistan (80)
- United Arab Emirates (85)
- Uzbekistan (291)
- Vietnam (196)
- Yemen (34)

Number of Athletes by National Olympic Committees (highest to lowest)

IOC	Country	Athletes
CHN	China	894
KOR	South Korea	833
JPN	Japan	718
THA	Thailand	518
IND	India	515
HKG	Hong Kong	476
TPE	Chinese Taipei	420
KAZ	Kazakhstan	415
UZB	Uzbekistan	291
IRI	Iran	282
MAS	Malaysia	277
KUW	Kuwait	258
QAT	Qatar	251
MGL	Mongolia	234
SIN	Singapore	230
NEP	Nepal	203
KSA	Saudi Arabia	202
VIE	Vietnam	196
PAK	Pakistan	188
INA	Indonesia	186
PRK	North Korea	150
PHI	Philippines	150
MDV	Maldives	142
BAN	Bangladesh	136
MAC	Macau	135
KGZ	Kyrgyzstan	117
LAO	Laos	102
JOR	Jordan	97
OMA	Oman	93
TJK	Tajikistan	92
UAE	United Arab Emirates	85
SRI	Sri Lanka	80
TKM	Turkmenistan	80
AFG	Afghanistan	69
BRN	Bahrain	69
MYA	Myanmar	64
IRQ	Iraq	63
PLE	Palestine	56
LIB	Lebanon	41
YEM	Yemen	34
TLS	Timor-Leste	33
SYR	Syria	30
CAM	Cambodia	20
BHU	Bhutan	16
BRU	Brunei	11

=== Calendar ===
In the following calendar for the 2014 Asian Games, each blue box represents an event competition, such as a qualification round, on that day. The yellow boxes represent days during which medal-awarding finals for a sport were held, which numeric representing the number of finals that were contested on that day. On the left, the calendar lists each sport with events held during the Games, and at the right how many gold medals were won in that sport. There is a key at the top of the calendar to aid the reader.

All times are in Korea Standard Time (UTC+9)

OC	Opening ceremony	●	Event competitions	1	Gold medal events	CC	Closing ceremony

September/October		14th Sun	15th Mon	16th Tue	17th Wed	18th Thu	19th Fri	20th Sat	21st Sun	22nd Mon	23rd Tue	24th Wed	25th Thu	26th Fri	27th Sat	28th Sun	29th Mon	30th Tue	1st Wed	2nd Thu	3rd Fri	4th Sat	Events
Ceremonies							OC															CC	—N/a
Aquatics	Diving																2	2	2	2	2		53
Aquatics	Swimming								6	6	7	7	6	6									53
Aquatics	Synchronized swimming							1	●	1	1												53
Aquatics	Water polo							●	●	●	1	●	●	●	●	●	●	●	1				53
Archery											●	●	●	●	4	4							8
Athletics															5	8	7	4	11	11	1		47
Badminton								●	●	1	1	●	●	●	1	2	2						7
Baseball	Baseball								●	●	●	●	●		●	1							2
Baseball	Softball														●	●	●		●	1			2
Basketball								●	●	●	●	●	●	●	●	●	●		●	1	1		2
Bowling											1	1	1	1	●	2	●	4	●	2			12
Boxing											●	●	●	●	●	●	●	●	3	●	10		13
Canoeing	Slalom																		●	4			16
Canoeing	Sprint														●	●	12						16
Cricket								●	●	●	●	●	●	1	●	●	●	●	●	●	1		2
Cycling	BMX																		2				18
Cycling	Mountain bike																	2					18
Cycling	Road														2	1	1						18
Cycling	Track							2	2	1	1	1	3										18
Equestrian								1	●		1	●	●	2		1		1					6
Fencing								2	2	2	2	2	2										12
Football		●	●	●	●	●		●	●	●	●	●	●	●	●	●		●	1	1			2
Golf													●	●	●	4							4
Gymnastics	Artistic							1	1	2	5	5											18
Gymnastics	Rhythmic																		1	1			18
Gymnastics	Trampolining													2									18
Handball								●	●	●		●	●	●		●	●	●	1	1			2
Field hockey								●	●	●	●	●	●	●	●		●	●	1	1			2
Judo								4	5	5	2												16
Kabaddi																●	●	●	●	●	2		2
Karate																				5	5	3	13
Modern pentathlon																				2	2		4
Rowing								●	●	●	●	7	7										14
Rugby sevens																		●	●	2			2
Sailing												●	●	●	●	●	●	●	14				14
Sepak takraw								●	●	2	●	●	●	●	●	2	●	●	●	●	2		6
Shooting								4	4	4	4	4	10	6	6		●	2					44
Soft tennis																	●	2	1	2	●	2	7
Squash								●	●	●	2	●	●	●	2								4
Table tennis															●	●	●	2	●	●	3	2	7
Taekwondo																		4	4	4	4		16
Tennis								●	●	●	●	2	●	●	●	●	3	2					7
Triathlon													2	1									3
Volleyball	Beach							●	●	●	●	●	●	●	●	1	1						4
Volleyball	Indoor							●	●	●	●	●	●	●	●	●	●	●	●	1	1		4
Weightlifting								2	2	2	2	2	2	3									15
Wrestling															4	4	4	4	4				20
Wushu								2	2	2	2	7											15
Daily medal events								18	24	27	29	38	38	22	24	30	32	29	46	41	34	7	439
Cumulative Total								18	42	69	98	136	174	196	220	250	282	311	357	398	432	439	439
September/October		14th Sun	15th Mon	16th Tue	17th Wed	18th Thu	19th Fri	20th Sat	21st Sun	22nd Mon	23rd Tue	24th Wed	25th Thu	26th Fri	27th Sat	28th Sun	29th Mon	30th Tue	1st Wed	2nd Thu	3rd Fri	4th Sat	Total events

=== Closing ceremony ===
The closing ceremony was held on October 4, 2014, at 7:00 p.m. local time. The ceremony's theme was "Our Cherished Memories of Incheon". OCA President Sheikh Ahmad Al Fahad Al Sabah, Prime Minister of South Korea Jung Hong-won, and Mayor of Incheon Yoo Jeong-bok were guests at the ceremony. The events featured the performances of National Dance Company of Korea, Gugak Center Dance Troupe and Kukkiwon. Soprano Im Sun-hae then sang the national anthem, whereupon the athletes entered the stadium with volunteers and placard bearers. CNBLUE performed "I'm Sorry" and "Can't Stop" before Sheikh Ahmad Al Fahad Al Sabah presented the Japaneses Kosuke Hagino the Samsung MVP award and declared the Incheon 2014 Asian Games closed.

The OCA Flag was lowered and the flag of Indonesia, the next games' host nation, was raised as the Indonesian national anthem was played. IOC member Rita Subowo, Governor of South Sumatra Alex Noerdin, and the Governor of Jakarta Basuki Tjahaja Purnama received the Games flag for the 2018 Games. The ceremony proceeded with a small scale segment from the next Asian Games host cities, Jakarta and Palembang. It began with "The Colours of Jakarta", featuring Ronggeng, a Javanese dance. This was followed by "The Spirit of South Sumatra", featured a Malay dance accompaniment of Rampak Nusantara drums.

The K-Pop stars Big Bang who performed their hit songs "Hands up" and "Fantastic Baby" wrapped up the closing ceremony, while Sistar performed during the pre-show concert.

== Medal table ==
China led the medal table for the ninth consecutive time. Cambodia won their first Asian Games gold medal in taekwondo. A total of 37 NOCs won at least one medal, and 28 NOCs won at least one gold medal. Eight NOCs failed to win any medals at the Games.

The top ten ranked NOCs at these Games are listed below. The host nation, South Korea, is highlighted.

* Host nation (South Korea)

Rank	Nation	Gold	Silver	Bronze	Total
1	China	151	109	85	345
2	South Korea*	79	70	79	228
3	Japan	47	77	76	200
4	Kazakhstan	28	23	33	84
5	Iran	21	18	18	57
6	Thailand	12	7	28	47
7	North Korea	11	11	14	36
8	India	11	9	37	57
9	Chinese Taipei	10	18	23	51
10	Qatar	10	0	4	14
11–37	Remaining	59	97	179	335
Totals (37 entries)		439	439	576	1,454

== Broadcasting ==
Incheon Asian Games Host Broadcasting Management (IHB) (Korean: 인천 아시아 경기대회 주관방송, romanized: Incheon Asia gyeonggi daehoe jugwan bangsong), a joint venture between Korean Broadcasting System (KBS) and Munhwa Broadcasting Corporation (MBC), launched on 8 May 2013, served as the host broadcaster of the Games. The International Broadcasting Centre was constructed in Songdo Convensia in Yeonsu District.

== Concerns and controversies ==
Before the Games, there were several controversies arose over finances, lack of public interest, transportation shortages for journalists, and several administrative decisions about the opening ceremony and gala show. Organizers were able to generate interest yet a few hundred empty seats remained in the 61,000-capacity stadium at the start of the opening ceremony. Organizers also supplied additional shuttle buses for the late-night shift personnel at the request of various international media organizations.

The OCA and FIBA also failed to compromise on a couple of policies, which caused one team to boycott the event and forced three teams to find replacement players. The Qatari women's basketball team withdrew from the Games when FIBA reaffirmed its ban on hijab, citing safety concerns. Basketball was the only sport to enforce a hijab ban in the Games. On the other hand, OCA policy on naturalised players contradicted the eligibility rules set by FIBA. The OCA disqualified United States-born players Quincy Davis, Andray Blatche, and Aaron Haynes from the Chinese Taipei, Filipino, and South Korean teams.

Several controversies erupted during the Games, mostly surrounding poor officiating. The majority of poor judging allegations occurred in boxing, highlighted by the controversial semifinal loss of Indian lightweight boxer Laishram Sarita Devi against eventual silver medalist Park Jina of South Korea. The judging of the match, Sarita Devi's refusal to accept the bronze medal, and her questionable behavior at the medal ceremony received widespread international attention and sparked numerous debates. The high volume of controversial boxing decisions led to accusations of widespread incompetence and host favoritism against the judges. Criticisms of the new scoring system were also raised. Shooting, and wrestling saw initial rulings by officials being overturned upon appeals.

Some 1,920 fluid samples from 1,600 athletes were tested during the Games. Six athletes tested positive for banned substances and were expelled from the Games, including two gold medalists who were stripped of their medals.

== See also ==
- 2013 Asian Indoor and Martial Arts Games
- 2014 Asian Para Games
- 2015 Summer Universiade
- 2015 Military World Games
- Olympics celebrated in South Korea
  - 1988 Summer Olympics – Seoul

Preceded by Guangzhou	Asian Games; Incheon; XVII Asian Games (2014)	Succeeded by Jakarta and Palembang
