= Taekwondo at the 2014 Asian Games =

Taekwondo competition

- Venue: Ganghwa Dolmens Gymnasium
- Dates: 30 September – 3 October 2014
- Competitors: 248 from 37 nations

Taekwondo at the 2014 Asian Games was held in Incheon, South Korea from September 30 to 3 October 2014. Men's and women's competitions had eight weight categories for each gender. All competition took place at the Ganghwa Dolmens Gymnasium. Each country was limited to having 6 men and 6 women.

== Schedule ==
P	Preliminary rounds	F	Final

Event↓/Date →	30th Tue		1st Wed		2nd Thu		3rd Fri	
Men's 54 kg							P	F
Men's 58 kg							P	F
Men's 63 kg					P	F		
Men's 68 kg					P	F		
Men's 74 kg	P	F						
Men's 80 kg			P	F				
Men's 87 kg	P	F						
Men's +87 kg			P	F				
Women's 46 kg			P	F				
Women's 49 kg	P	F						
Women's 53 kg	P	F						
Women's 57 kg			P	F				
Women's 62 kg					P	F		
Women's 67 kg					P	F		
Women's 73 kg							P	F
Women's +73 kg							P	F

== Medalists ==
=== Men ===
Event	Gold	Silver	Bronze
Finweight (−54 kg)	Kim Tae-hun; South Korea	Huang Yu-jen; Chinese Taipei	Ramnarong Sawekwiharee; Thailand
Finweight (−54 kg)	Kim Tae-hun; South Korea	Huang Yu-jen; Chinese Taipei	Molomyn Tümenbayar; Mongolia
Flyweight (−58 kg)	Farzan Ashourzadeh; Iran	Nursultan Mamayev; Kazakhstan	Yuma Yamada; Japan
Flyweight (−58 kg)	Farzan Ashourzadeh; Iran	Nursultan Mamayev; Kazakhstan	Wei Chen-yang; Chinese Taipei
Bantamweight (−63 kg)	Lee Dae-hoon; South Korea	Akkarin Kitwijarn; Thailand	Chen Yen-ming; Chinese Taipei
Bantamweight (−63 kg)	Lee Dae-hoon; South Korea	Akkarin Kitwijarn; Thailand	Ahmad Roman Abasi; Afghanistan
Featherweight (−68 kg)	Behnam Asbaghi; Iran	Huang Jiannan; China	Kairat Sarymsakov; Kazakhstan
Featherweight (−68 kg)	Behnam Asbaghi; Iran	Huang Jiannan; China	Keith Sembrano; Philippines
Lightweight (−74 kg)	Masoud Hajji-Zavareh; Iran	Nikita Rafalovich; Uzbekistan	Song Young-geon; South Korea
Lightweight (−74 kg)	Masoud Hajji-Zavareh; Iran	Nikita Rafalovich; Uzbekistan	Samuel Morrison; Philippines
Welterweight (−80 kg)	Mehdi Khodabakhshi; Iran	Maksim Rafalovich; Uzbekistan	Farkhod Negmatov; Tajikistan
Welterweight (−80 kg)	Mehdi Khodabakhshi; Iran	Maksim Rafalovich; Uzbekistan	Qiao Sen; China
Middleweight (−87 kg)	Jasur Baykuziyev; Uzbekistan	Chen Linglong; China	Shin Yeong-rae; South Korea
Middleweight (−87 kg)	Jasur Baykuziyev; Uzbekistan	Chen Linglong; China	Nattapat Tantramart; Thailand
Heavyweight (+87 kg)	Jo Chol-ho; South Korea	Dmitriy Shokin; Uzbekistan	Alisher Gulov; Tajikistan
Heavyweight (+87 kg)	Jo Chol-ho; South Korea	Dmitriy Shokin; Uzbekistan	Elias El-Hidari; Lebanon

=== Women ===
Event	Gold	Silver	Bronze
Finweight (−46 kg)	Kim So-hui; South Korea	Lin Wan-ting; Chinese Taipei	Anjelay Pelaez; Philippines
Finweight (−46 kg)	Kim So-hui; South Korea	Lin Wan-ting; Chinese Taipei	Panipak Wongpattanakit; Thailand
Flyweight (−49 kg)	Chanatip Sonkham; Thailand	Li Zhaoyi; China	Sun Huei-ning; Chinese Taipei
Flyweight (−49 kg)	Chanatip Sonkham; Thailand	Li Zhaoyi; China	Ronna Ilao; Philippines
Bantamweight (−53 kg)	Huang Yun-wen; Chinese Taipei	Yoon Jeong-yeon; South Korea	Sousan Hajipour; Iran
Bantamweight (−53 kg)	Huang Yun-wen; Chinese Taipei	Yoon Jeong-yeon; South Korea	Wu Jingyu; China
Featherweight (−57 kg)	Lee Ah-reum; South Korea	Mayu Hamada; Japan	Wang Yun; China
Featherweight (−57 kg)	Lee Ah-reum; South Korea	Mayu Hamada; Japan	Rangsiya Nisaisom; Thailand
Lightweight (−62 kg)	Lee Da-bin; South Korea	Zhang Hua; China	Chuang Chia-chia; Chinese Taipei
Lightweight (−62 kg)	Lee Da-bin; South Korea	Zhang Hua; China	Phạm Thị Thu Hiền; Vietnam
Welterweight (−67 kg)	Guo Yunfei; China	Lee Won-jin; South Korea	Hà Thị Nguyên; Vietnam
Welterweight (−67 kg)	Guo Yunfei; China	Lee Won-jin; South Korea	Liu Qing; Macau
Middleweight (−73 kg)	Sorn Seavmey; Cambodia	Fatemeh Rouhani; Iran	Abrar Al-Fahad; Kuwait
Middleweight (−73 kg)	Sorn Seavmey; Cambodia	Fatemeh Rouhani; Iran	Kirstie Alora; Philippines
Heavyweight (+73 kg)	Li Donghua; China	Akram Khodabandeh; Iran	Wang Junnan; Macau
Heavyweight (+73 kg)	Li Donghua; China	Akram Khodabandeh; Iran	Mokhru Khalimova; Tajikistan

== Medal table ==
Rank	Nation	Gold	Silver	Bronze	Total
1	South Korea (KOR)	6	2	2	10
2	Iran (IRI)	4	2	1	7
3	China (CHN)	2	4	3	9
4	Uzbekistan (UZB)	1	3	0	4
5	Chinese Taipei (TPE)	1	2	4	7
6	Thailand (THA)	1	1	4	6
7	Cambodia (CAM)	1	0	0	1
8	Japan (JPN)	0	1	1	2
8	Kazakhstan (KAZ)	0	1	1	2
10	Philippines (PHI)	0	0	5	5
11	Tajikistan (TJK)	0	0	3	3
12	Macau (MAC)	0	0	2	2
12	Vietnam (VIE)	0	0	2	2
14	Afghanistan (AFG)	0	0	1	1
14	Kuwait (KUW)	0	0	1	1
14	Lebanon (LIB)	0	0	1	1
14	Mongolia (MGL)	0	0	1	1
Totals (17 entries)		16	16	32	64

== Participating nations ==
A total of 248 athletes from 37 nations competed in taekwondo at the 2014 Asian Games:

- Afghanistan (9)
- Bangladesh (2)
- Bhutan (3)
- Brunei (1)
- Cambodia (3)
- China (12)
- Chinese Taipei (12)
- Hong Kong (1)
- India (11)
- Indonesia (4)
- Iran (11)
- Japan (6)
- Jordan (12)
- Kazakhstan (12)
- Kuwait (7)
- Kyrgyzstan (5)
- Laos (8)
- Lebanon (4)
- Macau (7)
- Malaysia (3)
- Mongolia (6)
- Myanmar (5)
- Nepal (12)
- Pakistan (5)
- Palestine (1)
- Philippines (12)
- Qatar (6)
- Saudi Arabia (4)
- South Korea (12)
- Tajikistan (9)
- Thailand (10)
- Timor-Leste (2)
- Turkmenistan (5)
- United Arab Emirates (1)
- Uzbekistan (11)
- Vietnam (12)
- Yemen (2)
