= Tajikistan at the 2014 Asian Games =

- IOC code: TJK
- NOC: National Olympic Committee of the Republic of Tajikistan

in Incheon
- Flag bearer: Mavzuna Chorieva
- Medals Ranked 23rd: Gold 1 Silver 1 Bronze 3 Total 5

Asian Games appearances (overview)
- 1994; 1998; 2002; 2006; 2010; 2014; 2018; 2022; 2026

Tajikistan participated in the 2014 Asian Games in Incheon, South Korea from 19 September to 4 October 2014.

== Medal summary ==
=== Medalists ===
Medal	Name	Sport	Event
Gold	Dilshod Nazarov	Athletics	Men's hammer throw
Silver	Zalimkhan Yusupov	Wrestling	Men's freestyle 65 kg
Bronze	Farkhod Negmatov	Taekwondo	Men's 80 kg
Bronze	Alisher Gulov	Taekwondo	Men's +87 kg
Bronze	Mokhru Khalimova	Taekwondo	Women's +73 kg

== Archery ==
Men's recurve

Athlete	Event	Ranking Round			Round of 64	Round of 32	Round of 16	Quarterfinals	Semifinals	Final/BM	Rank
Athlete	Event	Score	Rank	Seed	Opposition Score	Opposition Score	Opposition Score	Opposition Score	Opposition Score	Opposition Score	Rank
Robert Nam	Individual	1231	43 Q	28	Al-Kurbi (KSA); W 6 – 5	Kikuchi (JPN); L 2 – 6	Did not advance				

Women's recurve

Athlete	Event	Ranking Round			Round of 32	Round of 16	Quarterfinals	Semifinals	Final/BM	Rank
Athlete	Event	Score	Rank	Seed	Opposition Score	Opposition Score	Opposition Score	Opposition Score	Opposition Score	Rank
Firuza Zubaydova	Individual	1185	44 Q	26	Yuan (TPE); L 1 – 7	Did not advance				

== Athletics ==
Men's

Athlete	Event	Round 1			Semifinal		Final	
Athlete	Event	Heat	Time	Rank	Time	Rank	Time	Rank
Davron Atabaev	200 m	3	21.91	25	Did not advance			
Davron Atabaev	400 m	4	49.10	25	Did not advance			
Alexandr Pronzhenko	200 m	5	21.82	22 Q	22.35	20	Did not advance	
Alexandr Pronzhenko	400 m	2	47.97	20	Did not advance			
Farkhod Kuralov	800 m	2	1:50.55	10			Did not advance	
Farkhod Kuralov	1500 m	2	3:55.56	13			Did not advance	

Athlete	Event	Final	
Athlete	Event	Result	Rank
Dilshod Nazarov	Hammer throw	76.82	1st place, gold medalist(s)

Women

Athlete	Event	100m H	HJ	SP	200m	LJ	JT	800m	Total	Rank
Kristina Pronzhenko	Heptathlon	15.98; 717	1.56; 689	7.21; 348	26.16; 783	5.51; 703	26.33; 407	2:21.30; 806	4453	11

== Beach volleyball ==
Men

Athlete	Preliminary round		Round of 16	Quarterfinals	Semifinals	Final	Rank
Athlete	Group H	Rank	Round of 16	Quarterfinals	Semifinals	Final	Rank
Mukhsini Rustamzoda; Sharif Yorzoda	Sukto (THA); Sangkhachot (THA); L 0 - 2; 13-21, 8-21	4	Did not advance				25
Mukhsini Rustamzoda; Sharif Yorzoda	Abdul Hameed (MDV); Adil (MDV); L 0 - 2; 15-21, 15-21	4	Did not advance				25
Mukhsini Rustamzoda; Sharif Yorzoda	Abdelrasoul (QAT); Khallouf (QAT); L 0 - 2; 7-21, 15-21	4	Did not advance				25

Women

Athlete	Preliminary round		Round of 16	Quarterfinals	Semifinals	Final	Rank
Athlete	Group A	Rank	Round of 16	Quarterfinals	Semifinals	Final	Rank
Shahnoza Nazirova; Malika Dilovarshoeva	Wang (CHN); Yue (CHN); L 0 - 2; 2-21, 9-21	2 Q	Lee (KOR); Yoon (KOR); L 0 - 2; 3-21, 4-21	Did not advance			9

== Boxing ==
Men

Athlete	Event	Round of 32	Round of 16	Quarterfinal	Semifinal	Final	Rank
Murodjon Rasulov	49 kg	Langu (INA); L 1-2	Did not advance				17
Asror Vohidov	56 kg	Bye	Al-Wadi (JOR); L 1-2	Did not advance			9
Anvar Yunusov	60 kg	Bye	Shimizu (JPN); L DSQ	Did not advance			9
Navruz Jafoev	75 kg	Bye	Normatov (UZB); L 0-3	Did not advance			9
Jahon Qurbonov	91 kg		Bye	Al-Matbouli (JOR); L 1-2	Did not advance		5

Women

Athlete	Event	Round of 16	Quarterfinal	Semifinal	Final	Rank
Svetlana Veglina	51 kg	Lê (VIE); L 0-3	Did not advance			9
Mavzuna Chorieva	60 kg	Minowa (JPN); W TKO	Lừu (VIE); L 1-2	Did not advance		5

== Canoeing ==
Sprint
Men

Athlete	Event	Heat			Semifinal		Final		Rank
Athlete	Event	Heat	Time	Rank	Time	Rank	Time	Rank	Rank
Vitalii Serikov	C1 200 m	1	41.296	5 QS	42.239	1 Q	42.661	7	7
Shahriyor Daminov	C1 1000 m	2	4:32.134	4 QS	4:22.683	3 Q	4:19.162	9	9
Abdusattor Gafurov	K1 200 m	1	38.274	7 QS	40.407	7	Did not advance		13
Tokhir Nurmukhammadi	K1 1000 m	1	4:15.344	7 QS	4:09.315	7	Did not advance		13
Abdusattor Gafurov; Tokhir Nurmukhammadi	K2 200 m	1	35.908	7 QS	38.194	8	Did not advance		14
Abdusattor Gafurov; Tokhir Nurmukhammadi	K2 1000 m	1	3:51.308	7 QS	3:47.482	7	Did not advance		13

== Football ==
Men

Squad list	Preliminary round		Round of 16	Quarterfinals	Semifinal	Final	Rank
Squad list	Group C	Rank	Round of 16	Quarterfinals	Semifinal	Final	Rank
Alisher Tuychiev; Naim Ulmasov; Siyovush Asrorov; Alisher Sharipov; Khurshed Beknazarov; Bakhtiyor Azimov; Umedzhon Sharipov; Nuriddin Davronov; Shodibek Gaforov; Jahongir Ergashev; Amirbek Juraboev; Rasul Payzov; Romish Jalilov; Abdullo Saidov; Muminjon Gadoyboev; Dilshod Vasiev; Fatkhullo Fatkhuloev; Akhtam Nazarov	Singapore; W 1-0	2 Q	Iraq; L 2-4	Did not advance			13
Alisher Tuychiev; Naim Ulmasov; Siyovush Asrorov; Alisher Sharipov; Khurshed Beknazarov; Bakhtiyor Azimov; Umedzhon Sharipov; Nuriddin Davronov; Shodibek Gaforov; Jahongir Ergashev; Amirbek Juraboev; Rasul Payzov; Romish Jalilov; Abdullo Saidov; Muminjon Gadoyboev; Dilshod Vasiev; Fatkhullo Fatkhuloev; Akhtam Nazarov	Palestine; L 1-2	2 Q	Iraq; L 2-4	Did not advance			13
Alisher Tuychiev; Naim Ulmasov; Siyovush Asrorov; Alisher Sharipov; Khurshed Beknazarov; Bakhtiyor Azimov; Umedzhon Sharipov; Nuriddin Davronov; Shodibek Gaforov; Jahongir Ergashev; Amirbek Juraboev; Rasul Payzov; Romish Jalilov; Abdullo Saidov; Muminjon Gadoyboev; Dilshod Vasiev; Fatkhullo Fatkhuloev; Akhtam Nazarov	Oman; W 1-0	2 Q	Iraq; L 2-4	Did not advance			13

== Judo ==
Men

Athlete	Event	Elimination round of 32	Elimination round of 16	Quarterfinal	Semifinal	Final	Rank
Kabatullo Aminov	60 kg	Sarhan (PLE); W 110–000	Smetov (KAZ); L 000-111	Did not advance			9
Rasul Abdusharipov	66 kg	Bye	Khousrof (YEM); W 100-000	Tömörkhüleg (MGL); L 000-101	Repechage; Ma (CHN); W 100-000	3rd place match Farmonov (UZB); L 000–100	5
Saidmukhtor Rasulov	73 kg	Phrommala (LAO); W 100–000	Odbayar (MGL); L 000–000	Did not advance			9
Farhod Rahimov	81 kg	Bye	Ghaseminejad (IRI); L 000–101	Did not advance			9
Komronshokh Ustopiriyon	90 kg	Bye	Hojamuhammedov (TKM); W 101–000	Cheng (CHN); W 001–000	Yoshida (JPN); L 000–001	3rd place match Gwak (KOR); L 000–100	5
Dadakhon Kurbonaliev	100 kg		Tüvshinbayar (MGL); L 000–010	Did not advance			9
Mukhamadmurod Abdurakhmonov	+100 kg		Joshi (NEP); W 110–000	Krakovetskii (KGZ); L 000–110	Repechage; Liu (CHN); W 100-000	3rd place match Kim (KOR); L 000–000	5

== Karate ==
Men's kumite

Athlete	Event	1/16 final	1/8 final	Quarterfinal	Semifinal	Final	Rank
Safarali Davlatov	60 kg	Bye	Mehdizadeh (IRI); L 0-8		Repechage; Wang (CHN); L 2-7	Did not advance	7

== Shooting ==
Men
Rifle

Athlete	Event	Qualification		Final	
Athlete	Event	Points	Rank	Points	Rank
Dzhafar Shermatov	10 m air pistol	545-8x	53	Did not advance	
Eradzhbek Kuchkarov	10 m air pistol	541-6x	54	Did not advance	
Nurmukhammad Arutyunyan	10 m air pistol	533-9x	55	Did not advance	
Daler Erov	10 m air rifle	613.6	33	Did not advance	
Todzhiddin Valiev	10 m air rifle	601.9	51	Did not advance	
Umed Usmanov	10 m air rifle	598.7	53	Did not advance	
Nurmukhammad Arutyunyan; Eradzhbek Kuchkarov; Dzhafar Shermatov	10 m air pistol team	—		1685-32x	15
Daler Erov; Umed Usmanov; Todzhiddin Valiev	10 m air rifle team	—		1814.2	15

Women
Rifle

Athlete	Event	Qualification		Final	
Athlete	Event	Points	Rank	Points	Rank
Anastasiya Kozak	10 m air pistol	346-4x	48	Did not advance	
Sabrina Akhmedova	10 m air pistol	340-4x	50	Did not advance	
Malika Lagutenko	10 m air rifle	405.5	40	Did not advance	
Lyubov Lapshina	10 m air rifle	403.9	42	Did not advance	
Anisa Shomakhmadova	10 m air rifle	395.0	51	Did not advance	
Malika Lagutenko; Lyubov Lapshina; Anisa Shomakhmadova	10 m air rifle team	—		1218.4	14

== Soft tennis ==
Men

Athlete	Event	Preliminary round		Round of 16	Quarterfinals	Semifinals	Final	Rank
Athlete	Event	Group	Rank	Round of 16	Quarterfinals	Semifinals	Final	Rank
Negmatullo Rajabaliev	Singles	Katsura (JPN); L 0 - 4; 0-4, 0-4, 0-4, 1-4	6	Did not advance				24
Negmatullo Rajabaliev	Singles	Kim (KOR); L 0 - 4; 2-4, 0-4, 2-4, 0-4	6	Did not advance				24
Negmatullo Rajabaliev	Singles	Lin (TPE); L 0 - 4; 0-4, 2-4, 0-4, 0-4	6	Did not advance				24
Negmatullo Rajabaliev	Singles	Sombath (CAM); L 0 - 4; 0-4, 1-4, 2-4, 1-4	6	Did not advance				24
Negmatullo Rajabaliev	Singles	Subba (NEP); L 0 - 4; 0-4, 2-4, 3-5, 2-4	6	Did not advance				24
Mirhusein Yakhyaev	Singles	Nagae (JPN); L 0 - 4; 2-4, 1-4, 4-6, 0-4	5	Did not advance				20
Mirhusein Yakhyaev	Singles	Kim (KOR); L 0 - 4; 0-4, 1-4, 0-4, 0-4	5	Did not advance				20
Mirhusein Yakhyaev	Singles	Lin (TPE); L 0 - 4; 1-4, 1-4, 6-8, 0-4	5	Did not advance				20
Mirhusein Yakhyaev	Singles	Lâm (VIE); L 1 - 4; 0-4, 2-4, 0-4, 4-2, 0-4	5	Did not advance				20
Mirhusein Yakhyaev	Singles	Sayaline (LAO); W 4 - 1; 4-2, 3-5, 5-3, 4-2, 4-1	5	Did not advance				20
Negmatullo Rajabaliev; Mirhusein Yakhyaev	Doubles	Zhang (CHN); Lin (CHN); L 0 - 5; 1-4, 1-4, 1-4, 4-6, 1-4	5	Did not advance				20
Negmatullo Rajabaliev; Mirhusein Yakhyaev	Doubles	Kusdaryanto (INA); Simpatiaji (INA); L 0 - 5; 0-4, 2-4, 5-7, 1-4, 2-4	5	Did not advance				20
Negmatullo Rajabaliev; Mirhusein Yakhyaev	Doubles	Phongsavanh (LAO); Khamphoumy (LAO); L 0 - 5; 1-4, 1-4, 0-4, 0-4, 0-4	5	Did not advance				20
Negmatullo Rajabaliev; Mirhusein Yakhyaev	Doubles	Lin (TPE); Li (TPE); L 0 - 5 walkover	5	Did not advance				20

== Swimming ==
Men

Athlete	Event	Heats		Final	
Athlete	Event	Time	Rank	Time	Rank
Olim Kurbanov	50 m freestyle	27.65	37	Did not advance	
Olim Kurbanov	50 m breaststroke	38.30	26	Did not advance	
Radzhabmurod Kasymov	50 m freestyle	28.29	41	Did not advance	
Radzhabmurod Kasymov	100 m freestyle	1:08.52	39	Did not advance	
Ramziyor Khorkashov	50 m breaststroke	37.71	25	Did not advance	
Yokubdzhon Umarov	100 m breaststroke	1:23.35	28	Did not advance	
Ali-Somon Aliakhmadzoda	50 m butterfly	30.63	26	Did not advance	

== Taekwondo ==
Men

Athlete	Event	1/16 final	1/8 final	Quarterfinal	Semifinal	Final	Rank
Navruz Khamidov	54 kg	Yskak (KAZ); L 5-16	Did not advance				17
Davlatmurod Karimov	63 kg	Bye	Poon (HKG); L 1-2 R	Did not advance			9
Khusrav Giyosov	68 kg	Bakhazi (LIB); L 5-10	Did not advance				17
Shakhriyor Karimov	74 kg	Bye	Al-Adarbi (JOR); L 3-13	Did not advance			9
Farkhod Negmatov	80 kg		Liu (TPE); W 6-2	Ebrahim (AFG); W 14-0	Khodabakhshi (IRI); L 2-7	Did not advance	3rd place, bronze medalist(s)
Alisher Gulov	+87 kg			Yang (CHN); W 4-3	Shokin (UZB); L 0-12	Did not advance	3rd place, bronze medalist(s)

Women

Athlete	Event	1/16 final	1/8 final	Quarterfinal	Semifinal	Final	Rank
Farzona Radzhabova	53 kg		Bhandari (IND); L 2-7	Did not advance			9
Makhbuba Sharipova	57 kg	Bye	Sheshpari (IRI); L 0-12	Did not advance			9
Mokhru Khalimova	+73 kg			Mamatova (UZB); W 6-2	Li (CHN); L 1-7	Did not advance	3rd place, bronze medalist(s)

== Weightlifting (men) ==
Athlete	Event	Snatch	Clean & jerk	Total	Rank
Nizom Sangov	69 kg	122	140	262	14
Azizjon Shukurov	94 kg	123	165	288	11

== Wrestling ==
Men's freestyle

Athlete	Event	1/8 final	Quarterfinal	Semifinal	Final	Rank
Nikolay Noev	57 kg	Al-Yamani (YEM); W 12–2	Kaliyev (KAZ); L 2–7	Repechage match Ghazwani (KSA); W 7-0 F	3rd place match Yun (KOR); L 2-5	5
Farkhodi Usmonzoda	61 kg	Ali Saleh (YEM); W 10-0	Punia (IND); L 7-17	Repechage match Tüvshintulga (MGL); L 0-8	Did not advance	7
Zalimkhan Yusupov	65 kg	Mamatov (KGZ); W 4-3	Navruzov (UZB); W 10-8	Ishida (JPN); W 5-5	Dutt (IND); L 0-1	2nd place, silver medalist(s)
Somirsho Vokhidov	70 kg	Abdurakhmonov (UZB); L 0-10		Repechage match Ling (CHN); L 7-8	Did not advance	8
Azamat Sufiev	74 kg	Zaw (MYA); W 10–0	Shimada (JPN); L 0-10	Did not advance		9
Bakhodur Kadirov	86 kg	Abu-Snaina (PLE); W 12-0	Melejaýew (TKM); W 6-2	Nurzhumbayev (KAZ); L 4-14	3rd place match Ismanov (UZB); L 1-12	5
Rustam Iskandari	97 kg	Cui (CHN); W 10-0	Ibragimov (KAZ); L 2-11	Did not advance		7

Men's Greco-Roman

Athlete	Event	1/8 final	Quarterfinal	Semifinal	Final	Rank
Azizbeki Sharifzoda	59 kg	Bye	Hasegawa (JPN); L 4-4 F	Repechage match Tian (CHN); L 0-3 C	Did not advance	11
Khusrav Obloberdiev	66 kg	Yadav (IND); W 10-0	Matsumoto (JPN); L 2-5	Repechage match Tun (MYA); W 8-0	3rd place match Ri (PRK); L 0-4	5
Khabibullo Abdulloev	98 kg	Bye	Saparmämmedow (TKM); L 4-7	Did not advance		7
Murodjon Tuychiev	130 kg	Bye	Ramonov (KGZ); L 0-1	Did not advance		8

== Wushu ==
Men's taolu

Athlete	Event	Nanquan		Nangun		Total	
Athlete	Event	Score	Rank	Score	Rank	Score	Rank
Mirzodalerkhon Khurshedzoda	Nanquan	6.60	16	6.92	16	13.52	16

Women's taolu

Athlete	Event	Nandao		Nanquan		Total	
Athlete	Event	Score	Rank	Score	Rank	Score	Rank
Mashvaa Rakhmanova	Nanquan	Did not start				—	—
