= Soft tennis at the 2014 Asian Games – Men's singles =

Men's singles at the 2014 Asian Games
- Venue: Yeorumul Tennis Courts
- Dates: 29–30 September 2014
- Competitors: 24 from 13 nations

Medalists
gold medal	Kim Hyeong-jun	South Korea
silver medal	Edi Kusdaryanto	Indonesia
bronze medal	Kim Dong-hoon	South Korea
bronze medal	Zhou Mo	China

The men's singles soft tennis event was part of the soft tennis programme and took place between September 29 and 30, at the Yeorumul Tennis Courts.

== Schedule ==
All times are Korea Standard Time (UTC+09:00)

Date	Time	Event
Monday, 29 September 2014	16:30	Preliminary round
Tuesday, 30 September 2014	09:00	Preliminary round
Tuesday, 30 September 2014	13:00	Quarterfinals
Tuesday, 30 September 2014	14:30	Semifinals
Tuesday, 30 September 2014	16:00	Final

== Results ==
Legend

- WO — Won by walkover

=== Preliminary round ===
==== Group A ====
Pos	Athlete	Pld	W	L	GF	GA	GD	Qualification
1	Kim Hyeong-jun (KOR)	5	5	0	20	1	+19	Quarterfinals
2	Takuya Katsura (JPN)	5	4	1	17	6	+11	Quarterfinals
3	Lin Ting-chun (TPE)	5	2 (Note: Tied on head-to-head wins (1). Head-to-head game difference: TPE +4, CAM −1, NEP −3.)	3	10	8	+2	
4	Orn Sambath (CAM)	5	2	3	7	12	−5	
5	Manoj Subba (NEP)	5	2	3	8	15	−7	
6	Negmatullo Rajabaliev (TJK)	5	0	5	0	20	−20	

Source: OCA
Notes:

	Score		Game						
	Score		1	2	3	4	5	6	7
Kim Hyeong-jun (KOR)	4–0	Orn Sambath (CAM)	4–0	4–0	4–0	4–0			
Takuya Katsura (JPN)	4–0	Negmatullo Rajabaliev (TJK)	4–0	4–0	4–0	4–1			
Lin Ting-chun (TPE)	4–0	Manoj Subba (NEP)	4–1	4–1	5–3	4–1			
Kim Hyeong-jun (KOR)	4–0	Negmatullo Rajabaliev (TJK)	4–2	4–0	4–2	4–0			
Manoj Subba (NEP)	4–3	Orn Sambath (CAM)	5–7	4–1	4–0	7–5	2–4	2–4	7–3
Takuya Katsura (JPN)	4–2	Lin Ting-chun (TPE)	3–5	4–0	0–4	4–2	5–3	6–4	
Kim Hyeong-jun (KOR)	4–0	Manoj Subba (NEP)	4–1	5–3	4–1	4–2			
Lin Ting-chun (TPE)	4–0	Negmatullo Rajabaliev (TJK)	4–0	4–2	4–0	4–0			
Takuya Katsura (JPN)	4–0	Orn Sambath (CAM)	4–2	4–0	4–0	4–1			
Kim Hyeong-jun (KOR)	4–0	Lin Ting-chun (TPE)	4–0	4–1	5–3	5–3			
Takuya Katsura (JPN)	4–0	Manoj Subba (NEP)	4–1	4–0	5–3	5–3			
Negmatullo Rajabaliev (TJK)	0–4	Orn Sambath (CAM)	0–4	1–4	2–4	1–4			
Kim Hyeong-jun (KOR)	4–1	Takuya Katsura (JPN)	4–0	1–4	4–1	4–1	4–1		
Lin Ting-chun (TPE)	WO	Orn Sambath (CAM)							
Manoj Subba (NEP)	4–0	Negmatullo Rajabaliev (TJK)	4–0	4–2	5–3	4–2			

==== Group B ====
Pos	Athlete	Pld	W	L	GF	GA	GD	Qualification
1	Kim Dong-hoon (KOR)	5	5	0	20	3	+17	Quarterfinals
2	Lin Yu-tse (TPE)	5	4	1	19	5	+14	Quarterfinals
3	Koichi Nagae (JPN)	5	3	2	13	9	+4	
4	Lâm Quang Trí (VIE)	5	2	3	8	15	−7	
5	Mirhusein Yakhyaev (TJK)	5	1	4	5	17	−12	
6	Chittakone Sayaline (LAO)	5	0	5	4	20	−16	

Source: OCA

	Score		Game						
	Score		1	2	3	4	5	6	7
Kim Dong-hoon (KOR)	4–0	Lâm Quang Trí (VIE)	4–0	4–0	4–0	4–1			
Koichi Nagae (JPN)	4–0	Mirhusein Yakhyaev (TJK)	4–2	4–1	6–4	4–0			
Lin Yu-tse (TPE)	4–0	Chittakone Sayaline (LAO)	4–2	4–0	4–1	7–5			
Kim Dong-hoon (KOR)	4–0	Mirhusein Yakhyaev (TJK)	4–0	4–1	4–0	4–0			
Koichi Nagae (JPN)	1–4	Lin Yu-tse (TPE)	2–4	1–4	5–3	2–4	2–4		
Chittakone Sayaline (LAO)	2–4	Lâm Quang Trí (VIE)	5–3	4–1	3–5	1–4	0–4	2–4	
Kim Dong-hoon (KOR)	4–0	Chittakone Sayaline (LAO)	4–1	4–0	4–0	4–1			
Koichi Nagae (JPN)	4–0	Lâm Quang Trí (VIE)	4–0	4–0	4–2	4–2			
Lin Yu-tse (TPE)	4–0	Mirhusein Yakhyaev (TJK)	4–1	4–1	8–6	4–0			
Kim Dong-hoon (KOR)	4–3	Lin Yu-tse (TPE)	2–4	4–2	1–4	3–5	4–2	4–1	7–1
Koichi Nagae (JPN)	4–1	Chittakone Sayaline (LAO)	4–0	5–3	4–1	2–4	5–3		
Mirhusein Yakhyaev (TJK)	1–4	Lâm Quang Trí (VIE)	0–4	2–4	0–4	4–2	0–4		
Kim Dong-hoon (KOR)	4–0	Koichi Nagae (JPN)	5–3	4–0	5–3	4–1			
Lin Yu-tse (TPE)	4–0	Lâm Quang Trí (VIE)	4–0	4–2	5–3	6–4			
Chittakone Sayaline (LAO)	1–4	Mirhusein Yakhyaev (TJK)	2–4	5–3	3–5	2–4	1–4		

==== Group C ====
Pos	Athlete	Pld	W	L	GF	GA	GD	Qualification
1	Edi Kusdaryanto (INA)	5	4 (Note: Head-to-head result: INA 4–1 THA.)	1	17	10	+7	Quarterfinals
2	Sorrachet Uayporn (THA)	5	4	1	17	9	+8	Quarterfinals
3	Zhang Yusheng (CHN)	5	3 (Note: Head-to-head result: CHN 4–1 MGL.)	2	15	10	+5	
4	Bolortuyaagiin Enkhjin (MGL)	5	3	2	16	12	+4	
5	Jhomar Arcilla (PHI)	5	1	4	11	16	−5	
6	Kamal Bahadur Bhandari (NEP)	5	0	5	1	20	−19	

Source: OCA
Notes:

	Score		Game						
	Score		1	2	3	4	5	6	7
Edi Kusdaryanto (INA)	4–1	Sorrachet Uayporn (THA)	2–4	4–1	6–4	4–2	4–1		
Zhang Yusheng (CHN)	4–1	Jhomar Arcilla (PHI)	4–1	2–4	4–2	9–7	4–1		
Edi Kusdaryanto (INA)	4–2	Jhomar Arcilla (PHI)	0–4	2–4	4–1	4–1	4–2	5–3	
Bolortuyaagiin Enkhjin (MGL)	4–1	Kamal Bahadur Bhandari (NEP)	4–2	4–1	4–2	0–4	4–2		
Zhang Yusheng (CHN)	4–1	Bolortuyaagiin Enkhjin (MGL)	2–4	4–1	5–3	4–0	5–3		
Kamal Bahadur Bhandari (NEP)	0–4	Sorrachet Uayporn (THA)	0–4	2–4	2–4	2–4			
Edi Kusdaryanto (INA)	4–0	Kamal Bahadur Bhandari (NEP)	4–2	4–0	11–9	4–2			
Bolortuyaagiin Enkhjin (MGL)	4–2	Jhomar Arcilla (PHI)	2–4	4–1	4–1	4–1	2–4	4–2	
Zhang Yusheng (CHN)	0–4	Sorrachet Uayporn (THA)	1–4	3–5	0–4	7–9			
Edi Kusdaryanto (INA)	1–4	Bolortuyaagiin Enkhjin (MGL)	6–4	3–5	1–4	2–4	1–4		
Zhang Yusheng (CHN)	4–0	Kamal Bahadur Bhandari (NEP)	4–2	4–1	4–2	4–1			
Jhomar Arcilla (PHI)	2–4	Sorrachet Uayporn (THA)	4–2	4–2	2–4	5–7	3–5	5–7	
Edi Kusdaryanto (INA)	4–3	Zhang Yusheng (CHN)	5–3	3–5	4–1	5–7	4–0	0–4	7–3
Bolortuyaagiin Enkhjin (MGL)	3–4	Sorrachet Uayporn (THA)	4–1	1–4	4–2	2–4	3–5	4–1	2–7
Kamal Bahadur Bhandari (NEP)	0–4	Jhomar Arcilla (PHI)	1–4	2–4	2–4	2–4			

==== Group D ====
Pos	Athlete	Pld	W	L	GF	GA	GD	Qualification
1	Zhou Mo (CHN)	5	5	0	20	3	+17	Quarterfinals
2	Joseph Arcilla (PHI)	5	4	1	16	11	+5	Quarterfinals
3	Hendri Susilo Pramono (INA)	5	3	2	15	12	+3	
4	Enkhbaataryn Telmen (MGL)	5	2	3	14	13	+1	
5	Trần Thanh Hoàng (VIE)	5	1	4	7	16	−9	
6	Khampaseuth Bounsaath (LAO)	5	0	5	3	20	−17	

Source: OCA

	Score		Game						
	Score		1	2	3	4	5	6	7
Hendri Susilo Pramono (INA)	4–0	Trần Thanh Hoàng (VIE)	5–3	7–5	4–2	4–2			
Zhou Mo (CHN)	4–0	Joseph Arcilla (PHI)	4–1	7–5	4–2	4–2			
Enkhbaataryn Telmen (MGL)	4–0	Khampaseuth Bounsaath (LAO)	4–1	4–2	4–1	4–2			
Hendri Susilo Pramono (INA)	2–4	Joseph Arcilla (PHI)	4–2	2–4	4–1	2–4	1–4	1–4	
Zhou Mo (CHN)	4–1	Enkhbaataryn Telmen (MGL)	1–4	5–3	4–0	4–2	4–2		
Khampaseuth Bounsaath (LAO)	0–4	Trần Thanh Hoàng (VIE)	1–4	5–7	0–4	2–4			
Hendri Susilo Pramono (INA)	4–2	Khampaseuth Bounsaath (LAO)	2–4	5–3	1–4	4–1	5–3	4–2	
Zhou Mo (CHN)	4–1	Trần Thanh Hoàng (VIE)	4–1	2–4	4–2	4–0	4–0		
Enkhbaataryn Telmen (MGL)	3–4	Joseph Arcilla (PHI)	4–6	2–4	5–3	4–0	4–0	4–6	1–7
Hendri Susilo Pramono (INA)	4–2	Enkhbaataryn Telmen (MGL)	4–0	2–4	4–1	4–2	11–13	4–0	
Zhou Mo (CHN)	4–0	Khampaseuth Bounsaath (LAO)	4–1	4–0	4–2	6–4			
Joseph Arcilla (PHI)	4–1	Trần Thanh Hoàng (VIE)	4–1	4–0	2–4	4–2	4–2		
Hendri Susilo Pramono (INA)	1–4	Zhou Mo (CHN)	4–2	3–5	3–5	1–4	1–4		
Enkhbaataryn Telmen (MGL)	4–1	Trần Thanh Hoàng (VIE)	4–2	4–2	3–5	4–2	5–3		
Khampaseuth Bounsaath (LAO)	1–4	Joseph Arcilla (PHI)	3–5	3–5	5–3	0–4	2–4		

=== Knockout round ===
Quarterfinals
A1	Kim Hyeong-jun (KOR)	2	0	5	4	6	4
B2	Lin Yu-tse (TPE)	4	4	3	0	4	0
A2	Takuya Katsura (JPN)	2	1	1	4	3
B1	Kim Dong-hoon (KOR)	4	4	4	1	5
C1	Edi Kusdaryanto (INA)	4	4	5	4	5
D2	Joseph Arcilla (PHI)	2	2	3	6	3
C2	Sorrachet Uayporn (THA)	0	4	8	1	1
D1	Zhou Mo (CHN)	4	2	10	4	4

Semifinals
A1	Kim Hyeong-jun (KOR)	2	4	5	4	5	3	7
B1	Kim Dong-hoon (KOR)	4	1	3	0	7	5	4
C1	Edi Kusdaryanto (INA)	4	5	4	4	5
D1	Zhou Mo (CHN)	1	3	2	6	3

Final
A1	Kim Hyeong-jun (KOR)	4	4	4	4
C1	Edi Kusdaryanto (INA)	2	0	0	2
