= Soft tennis at the 2014 Asian Games – Men's doubles =

Men's doubles at the 2014 Asian Games
- Venue: Yeorumul Tennis Courts
- Dates: 2 October 2014
- Competitors: 40 from 12 nations

Medalists
gold medal	Kim Dong-hoon; Kim Beom-jun	South Korea
silver medal	Lin Ting-chun; Li Chia-hung	Chinese Taipei
bronze medal	Lee Sang-gwon; Park Kyu-cheol	South Korea
bronze medal	Ho Meng-hsun; Lai Li-huang	Chinese Taipei

The men's doubles soft tennis event was part of the soft tennis programme and took place on October 2, at the Yeorumul Tennis Courts.

== Schedule ==
All times are Korea Standard Time (UTC+09:00)

Date	Time	Event
Thursday, 2 October 2014	09:00	Preliminary round
Thursday, 2 October 2014	13:30	Quarterfinals
Thursday, 2 October 2014	17:10	Semifinals
Thursday, 2 October 2014	18:30	Final

== Results ==
Legend

- WO — Won by walkover

=== Preliminary round ===
==== Group A ====
Pos	Team	Pld	W	L	GF	GA	GD	Qualification
1	Lin Ting-chun (TPE) Li Chia-hung (TPE)	4	4	0	15	1	+14	Quarterfinals
2	Edi Kusdaryanto (INA) Prima Simpatiaji (INA)	4	3	1	16	8	+8	Quarterfinals
3	Zhang Yusheng (CHN) Lin Chengwei (CHN)	4	2	2	13	10	+3	
4	Khanthanou Phongsavanh (LAO) Ananda Khamphoumy (LAO)	4	1	3	5	15	−10	
5	Negmatullo Rajabaliev (TJK) Mirhusein Yakhyaev (TJK)	4	0	4	0	15	−15	

Source: OCA

	Score		Game								
	Score		1	2	3	4	5	6	7	8	9
Edi Kusdaryanto (INA); Prima Simpatiaji (INA)	5–0	Khanthanou Phongsavanh (LAO); Ananda Khamphoumy (LAO)	5–3	8–6	4–2	6–4	4–0				
Negmatullo Rajabaliev (TJK); Mirhusein Yakhyaev (TJK)	0–5	Zhang Yusheng (CHN); Lin Chengwei (CHN)	1–4	1–4	1–4	4–6	1–4				
Lin Ting-chun (TPE); Li Chia-hung (TPE)	5–0	Khanthanou Phongsavanh (LAO); Ananda Khamphoumy (LAO)	5–3	4–0	4–0	4–2	4–2				
Edi Kusdaryanto (INA); Prima Simpatiaji (INA)	5–0	Negmatullo Rajabaliev (TJK); Mirhusein Yakhyaev (TJK)	4–0	4–2	7–5	4–1	4–2				
Lin Ting-chun (TPE); Li Chia-hung (TPE)	5–0	Zhang Yusheng (CHN); Lin Chengwei (CHN)	6–4	4–1	4–1	4–0	4–1				
Negmatullo Rajabaliev (TJK); Mirhusein Yakhyaev (TJK)	0–5	Khanthanou Phongsavanh (LAO); Ananda Khamphoumy (LAO)	1–4	1–4	0–4	0–4	0–4				
Lin Ting-chun (TPE); Li Chia-hung (TPE)	WO	Negmatullo Rajabaliev (TJK); Mirhusein Yakhyaev (TJK)									
Edi Kusdaryanto (INA); Prima Simpatiaji (INA)	5–3	Zhang Yusheng (CHN); Lin Chengwei (CHN)	6–4	2–4	4–2	3–5	4–6	4–2	4–1	4–0	
Lin Ting-chun (TPE); Li Chia-hung (TPE)	5–1	Edi Kusdaryanto (INA); Prima Simpatiaji (INA)	7–5	4–6	6–4	4–1	4–0	4–2			
Zhang Yusheng (CHN); Lin Chengwei (CHN)	5–0	Khanthanou Phongsavanh (LAO); Ananda Khamphoumy (LAO)	4–2	5–3	4–2	4–2	5–3				

==== Group B ====
Pos	Team	Pld	W	L	GF	GA	GD	Qualification
1	Lee Sang-gwon (KOR) Park Kyu-cheol (KOR)	4	4	0	20	4	+16	Quarterfinals
2	Hidenori Shinohara (JPN) Koji Kobayashi (JPN)	4	3	1	19	5	+14	Quarterfinals
3	Altankhuyagiin Damdin (MGL) Bolortuyaagiin Enkhjin (MGL)	4	2	2	10	11	−1	
4	Sohan Dhauvadel (NEP) Sthapit Ujjol (NEP)	4	1	3	6	16	−10	
5	Ngoun Meng Chheng (CAM) Orn Sambath (CAM)	4	0	4	1	20	−19	

Source: OCA

	Score		Game								
	Score		1	2	3	4	5	6	7	8	9
Lee Sang-gwon (KOR); Park Kyu-cheol (KOR)	5–0	Ngoun Meng Chheng (CAM); Orn Sambath (CAM)	4–1	4–0	4–2	4–0	4–0				
Altankhuyagiin Damdin (MGL); Bolortuyaagiin Enkhjin (MGL)	5–1	Sohan Dhauvadel (NEP); Sthapit Ujjol (NEP)	2–4	4–2	6–4	4–2	4–1	6–4			
Hidenori Shinohara (JPN); Koji Kobayashi (JPN)	5–0	Ngoun Meng Chheng (CAM); Orn Sambath (CAM)	4–0	4–2	4–0	4–0	4–1				
Lee Sang-gwon (KOR); Park Kyu-cheol (KOR)	5–0	Altankhuyagiin Damdin (MGL); Bolortuyaagiin Enkhjin (MGL)	4–2	4–0	8–6	4–0	4–0				
Hidenori Shinohara (JPN); Koji Kobayashi (JPN)	5–0	Sohan Dhauvadel (NEP); Sthapit Ujjol (NEP)	4–0	4–2	4–0	4–2	4–2				
Altankhuyagiin Damdin (MGL); Bolortuyaagiin Enkhjin (MGL)	5–0	Ngoun Meng Chheng (CAM); Orn Sambath (CAM)	4–0	5–3	8–6	4–0	4–0				
Hidenori Shinohara (JPN); Koji Kobayashi (JPN)	5–0	Altankhuyagiin Damdin (MGL); Bolortuyaagiin Enkhjin (MGL)	4–2	4–1	4–0	7–5	4–0				
Lee Sang-gwon (KOR); Park Kyu-cheol (KOR)	5–0	Sohan Dhauvadel (NEP); Sthapit Ujjol (NEP)	4–1	4–0	4–1	4–0	4–1				
Hidenori Shinohara (JPN); Koji Kobayashi (JPN)	4–5	Lee Sang-gwon (KOR); Park Kyu-cheol (KOR)	4–1	4–1	2–4	8–6	5–7	3–5	7–5	2–4	5–7
Sohan Dhauvadel (NEP); Sthapit Ujjol (NEP)	5–1	Ngoun Meng Chheng (CAM); Orn Sambath (CAM)	4–1	4–2	4–6	4–0	4–2	4–0			

==== Group C ====
Pos	Team	Pld	W	L	GF	GA	GD	Qualification
1	Ho Meng-hsun (TPE) Lai Li-huang (TPE)	4	4	0	20	5	+15	Quarterfinals
2	Takuya Katsura (JPN) Keiya Nakamoto (JPN)	4	3	1	19	8	+11	Quarterfinals
3	Lâm Quang Trí (VIE) Huỳnh Chí Khương (VIE)	4	1 (Note: Tied on head-to-head wins (1). Head-to-head game difference: VIE +3, PHI 0, MGL −3.)	3	9	16	−7	
4	Jhomar Arcilla (PHI) Joseph Arcilla (PHI)	4	1	3	9	16	−7	
5	Gantulgyn Enkhtüvshin (MGL) Ochirsaikhany Bayasgalant (MGL)	4	1	3	7	19	−12	

Source: OCA
Notes:

	Score		Game								
	Score		1	2	3	4	5	6	7	8	9
Takuya Katsura (JPN); Keiya Nakamoto (JPN)	5–0	Lâm Quang Trí (VIE); Huỳnh Chí Khương (VIE)	4–2	7–5	4–2	4–0	5–3				
Ho Meng-hsun (TPE); Lai Li-huang (TPE)	5–1	Gantulgyn Enkhtüvshin (MGL); Ochirsaikhany Bayasgalant (MGL)	4–0	2–4	4–1	4–0	6–4	4–2			
Jhomar Arcilla (PHI); Joseph Arcilla (PHI)	1–5	Lâm Quang Trí (VIE); Huỳnh Chí Khương (VIE)	3–5	4–6	3–5	2–4	4–1	0–4			
Takuya Katsura (JPN); Keiya Nakamoto (JPN)	4–5	Ho Meng-hsun (TPE); Lai Li-huang (TPE)	5–3	2–4	4–2	0–4	4–2	3–5	4–0	1–4	6–8
Jhomar Arcilla (PHI); Joseph Arcilla (PHI)	5–1	Gantulgyn Enkhtüvshin (MGL); Ochirsaikhany Bayasgalant (MGL)	4–2	5–7	4–2	4–2	4–1	4–1			
Ho Meng-hsun (TPE); Lai Li-huang (TPE)	5–0	Lâm Quang Trí (VIE); Huỳnh Chí Khương (VIE)	4–2	4–2	4–2	4–0	4–0				
Jhomar Arcilla (PHI); Joseph Arcilla (PHI)	0–5	Ho Meng-hsun (TPE); Lai Li-huang (TPE)	0–4	1–4	2–4	2–4	1–4				
Takuya Katsura (JPN); Keiya Nakamoto (JPN)	5–0	Gantulgyn Enkhtüvshin (MGL); Ochirsaikhany Bayasgalant (MGL)	4–0	4–0	4–1	4–1	4–3				
Jhomar Arcilla (PHI); Joseph Arcilla (PHI)	3–5	Takuya Katsura (JPN); Keiya Nakamoto (JPN)	4–6	3–5	4–6	5–3	4–1	0–4	4–1	0–4	
Gantulgyn Enkhtüvshin (MGL); Ochirsaikhany Bayasgalant (MGL)	5–4	Lâm Quang Trí (VIE); Huỳnh Chí Khương (VIE)	3–5	0–4	6–4	6–4	3–5	4–1	6–4	2–4	7–5

==== Group D ====
Pos	Team	Pld	W	L	GF	GA	GD	Qualification
1	Kim Dong-hoon (KOR) Kim Beom-jun (KOR)	4	4	0	20	0	+20	Quarterfinals
2	Ferdy Fauzi Narun (INA) Hendri Susilo Pramono (INA)	4	3	1	15	11	+4	Quarterfinals
3	Zhou Mo (CHN) Shi Xiaolin (CHN)	4	2	2	12	13	−1	
4	Kamal Bahadur Bhandari (NEP) Manoj Subba (NEP)	4	1	3	11	17	−6	
5	Chittakone Sayaline (LAO) Khampaseuth Bounsaath (LAO)	4	0	4	3	20	−17	

Source: OCA

	Score		Game								
	Score		1	2	3	4	5	6	7	8	9
Ferdy Fauzi Narun (INA); Hendri Susilo Pramono (INA)	5–0	Chittakone Sayaline (LAO); Khampaseuth Bounsaath (LAO)	4–0	4–1	4–2	6–4	4–2				
Zhou Mo (CHN); Shi Xiaolin (CHN)	5–2	Kamal Bahadur Bhandari (NEP); Manoj Subba (NEP)	4–1	4–0	5–3	5–7	4–2	1–4	4–0		
Kim Dong-hoon (KOR); Kim Beom-jun (KOR)	5–0	Chittakone Sayaline (LAO); Khampaseuth Bounsaath (LAO)	4–1	4–1	4–1	4–2	4–1				
Ferdy Fauzi Narun (INA); Hendri Susilo Pramono (INA)	5–2	Zhou Mo (CHN); Shi Xiaolin (CHN)	2–4	4–0	3–5	4–2	4–2	10–8	4–2		
Kim Dong-hoon (KOR); Kim Beom-jun (KOR)	5–0	Kamal Bahadur Bhandari (NEP); Manoj Subba (NEP)	4–0	4–2	4–0	4–2	4–1				
Zhou Mo (CHN); Shi Xiaolin (CHN)	5–1	Chittakone Sayaline (LAO); Khampaseuth Bounsaath (LAO)	4–0	1–4	4–2	4–0	4–1	4–1			
Kim Dong-hoon (KOR); Kim Beom-jun (KOR)	5–0	Zhou Mo (CHN); Shi Xiaolin (CHN)	4–2	4–2	4–1	4–1	7–5				
Ferdy Fauzi Narun (INA); Hendri Susilo Pramono (INA)	5–4	Kamal Bahadur Bhandari (NEP); Manoj Subba (NEP)	2–4	0–4	2–4	3–5	4–2	4–2	4–1	4–1	7–4
Kim Dong-hoon (KOR); Kim Beom-jun (KOR)	5–0	Ferdy Fauzi Narun (INA); Hendri Susilo Pramono (INA)	5–3	4–2	4–1	4–2	5–3				
Kamal Bahadur Bhandari (NEP); Manoj Subba (NEP)	5–2	Chittakone Sayaline (LAO); Khampaseuth Bounsaath (LAO)	4–1	4–0	5–7	4–1	2–4	6–4	4–1		

=== Knockout round ===
Quarterfinals
A1	Lin Ting-chun (TPE); Li Chia-hung (TPE)	0	2	8	0	4	4	4	4	7
B2	Hidenori Shinohara (JPN); Koji Kobayashi (JPN)	4	4	10	4	2	0	1	2	2
A2	Edi Kusdaryanto (INA); Prima Simpatiaji (INA)	1	3	1	2	1
B1	Lee Sang-gwon (KOR); Park Kyu-cheol (KOR)	4	5	4	4	4
C1	Ho Meng-hsun (TPE); Lai Li-huang (TPE)	4	1	1	6	4	5	4
D1	Ferdy Fauzi Narun (INA); Hendri Susilo Pramono (INA)	2	4	4	4	1	3	2
C2	Takuya Katsura (JPN); Keiya Nakamoto (JPN)	3	12	2	1	2	9	0
D1	Kim Dong-hoon (KOR); Kim Beom-jun (KOR)	5	10	4	4	4	7	4

Semifinals
A1	Lin Ting-chun (TPE); Li Chia-hung (TPE)	3	4	4	5	4	1	6
B1	Lee Sang-gwon (KOR); Park Kyu-cheol (KOR)	5	1	2	3	1	4	4
C1	Ho Meng-hsun (TPE); Lai Li-huang (TPE)	1	3	4	1	3	6
D1	Kim Dong-hoon (KOR); Kim Beom-jun (KOR)	4	5	0	4	5	8

Final
A1	Lin Ting-chun (TPE); Li Chia-hung (TPE)	8	5	4	2	3	4	1
D1	Kim Dong-hoon (KOR); Kim Beom-jun (KOR)	10	3	2	4	5	6	4
