= Swimming at the 2014 Asian Games – Men's 50 metre breaststroke =

Men's 50 metre breaststroke at the 2014 Asian Games
- Venue: Munhak Park Tae-hwan Aquatics Center
- Date: 26 September 2014
- Competitors: 28 from 20 nations

Medalists
gold medal	Dmitriy Balandin	Kazakhstan
silver medal	Yasuhiro Koseki	Japan
bronze medal	Sandeep Sejwal	India

The men's 50 metre breaststroke event at the 2014 Asian Games took place on 26 September 2014 at Munhak Park Tae-hwan Aquatics Center.

== Schedule ==
All times are Korea Standard Time (UTC+09:00)

Date	Time	Event
Friday, 26 September 2014	09:00	Heats
Friday, 26 September 2014	19:06	Final

== Records ==
Prior to this competition, the existing world, Asian and Games records were as follows.

World Record	Adam Peaty (GBR)	26.62	Berlin, Germany	22 August 2014
Asian Record	Kosuke Kitajima (JPN)	27.30	Tokyo, Japan	13 April 2010
Games Record	Xie Zhi (CHN)	27.80	Guangzhou, China	14 November 2010

== Results ==
Legend

- DNS — Did not start

=== Heats ===
Rank	Heat	Athlete	Time	Notes
1	4	Yasuhiro Koseki (JPN)	27.92	
2	2	Sandeep Sejwal (IND)	28.25	
3	4	Kim Myung-hwan (KOR)	28.45	
4	3	Dmitriy Balandin (KAZ)	28.49	
5	4	Wang Shuai (CHN)	28.57	
6	2	Ma Xiang (CHN)	28.58	
6	4	Vladislav Mustafin (UZB)	28.58	
8	2	Wong Chun Yan (HKG)	28.66	
9	3	Joshua Hall (PHI)	28.67	
10	3	Naoya Tomita (JPN)	28.77	
11	4	Ronald Tsui (HKG)	29.18	
12	3	Chao Man Hou (MAC)	29.25	
13	2	Dennis Josua Tiwa (INA)	29.38	
14	4	Mubarak Mohamed Al-Besher (UAE)	29.56	
15	2	Radomyos Matjiur (THA)	29.89	
16	3	Chou Kit (MAC)	29.94	
17	2	Dmitriy Shvetsov (UZB)	30.20	
18	3	Ahmad Al-Bader (KUW)	30.40	
19	3	Aria Nasimi Shad (IRI)	31.06	
20	2	Walid Dalloul (QAT)	31.60	
21	4	Kameil Al-Qallaf (KSA)	31.66	
22	1	Hem Thon Ponleu (CAM)	32.67	
23	1	Erdenebilegiin Byambasüren (MGL)	32.85	
24	3	Baasandorjiin Amarbold (MGL)	34.17	
25	1	Ramziyor Khorkashov (TJK)	37.71	
26	2	Olim Kurbanov (TJK)	38.30	
27	1	Mubal Azzam Ibrahim (MDV)	40.79	
—	4	Mehdi Ansari (IRI)	DNS	

=== Final ===
Rank	Athlete	Time	Notes
1st place, gold medalist(s)	Dmitriy Balandin (KAZ)	27.78	GR
2nd place, silver medalist(s)	Yasuhiro Koseki (JPN)	27.89	
3rd place, bronze medalist(s)	Sandeep Sejwal (IND)	28.26	
4	Vladislav Mustafin (UZB)	28.57	
5	Kim Myung-hwan (KOR)	28.76	
6	Wang Shuai (CHN)	28.79	
7	Ma Xiang (CHN)	28.80	
8	Wong Chun Yan (HKG)	28.94	
