= Taekwondo at the 2014 Asian Games – Women's 53 kg =

Taekwondo competition

Women's 53 kg at the 2014 Asian Games
- Venue: Ganghwa Dolmens Gymnasium
- Date: 30 September 2014
- Competitors: 16 from 16 nations

Medalists
gold medal	Huang Yun-wen	Chinese Taipei
silver medal	Yoon Jeong-yeon	South Korea
bronze medal	Sousan Hajipour	Iran
bronze medal	Wu Jingyu	China

The Women's bantamweight (53 kilograms) event at the 2014 Asian Games took place on 30 September 2014 at Ganghwa Dolmens Gymnasium, Incheon, South Korea.

A total of sixteen competitors from sixteen countries competed in this event, limited to fighters whose body weight was less than 53 kilograms.

Huang Yun-wen of Chinese Tapei won the title and gold medal after beating Yoon Jeong-yeon of South Korea in the gold medal match by the score of 4–2.

The bronze medal was shared by Wu Jingyu of China and Sousan Hajipour from Iran. Athletes from Vietnam, Thailand, Uzbekistan and India lost in quarterfinals and finished fifth.

== Schedule ==
All times are Korea Standard Time (UTC+09:00)

Date	Time	Event
Tuesday, 30 September 2014	09:30	Round of 16
Tuesday, 30 September 2014	15:30	Quarterfinals
Tuesday, 30 September 2014	15:30	Semifinals
Tuesday, 30 September 2014	18:00	Final

== Results ==
Round of 16
Neema Gurung (NEP)	0
Huang Yun-wen (TPE)	12
Nila Ahmadi (AFG)	0
Nguyễn Thanh Thảo (VIE)	13
Nicole Cham (PHI)	0
Sarita Phongsri (THA)	12
Fariza Aldangorova (KAZ)	3
Sousan Hajipour (IRI)	9
Latika Bhandari (IND)	7
Farzona Radzhabova (TJK)	2
Yoon Jeong-yeon (KOR)	15
Gansükhiin Oyuun-Erdene (MGL)	1
Aida Lemos (TLS)	3
Guzal Narbabaeva (UZB)	4
Aýlar Gurbanowa (TKM)	2
Wu Jingyu (CHN)	17

Quarterfinals
Huang Yun-wen (TPE)	13
Nguyễn Thanh Thảo (VIE)	5
Sarita Phongsri (THA)	6
Sousan Hajipour (IRI)	7
Latika Bhandari (IND)	1
Yoon Jeong-yeon (KOR)	13
Guzal Narbabaeva (UZB)	3
Wu Jingyu (CHN)	16

Semifinals
Huang Yun-wen (TPE)	5
Sousan Hajipour (IRI)	0
Yoon Jeong-yeon (KOR)	6
Wu Jingyu (CHN)	4

Final
Huang Yun-wen (TPE)	4
Yoon Jeong-yeon (KOR)	2
