= Taekwondo at the 2014 Asian Games – Men's 54 kg =

Taekwondo competition

Men's 54 kg at the 2014 Asian Games
- Venue: Ganghwa Dolmens Gymnasium
- Date: 3 October 2014
- Competitors: 22 from 22 nations

Medalists
gold medal	Kim Tae-hun	South Korea
silver medal	Huang Yu-jen	Chinese Taipei
bronze medal	Ramnarong Sawekwiharee	Thailand
bronze medal	Molomyn Tümenbayar	Mongolia

The men's finweight (54 kilograms) event at the 2014 Asian Games took place on 3 October 2014 at Ganghwa Dolmens Gymnasium, Incheon, South Korea.

== Schedule ==
All times are Korea Standard Time (UTC+09:00)

Date	Time	Event
Friday, 3 October 2014	09:30	Round of 32
Friday, 3 October 2014	09:30	Round of 16
Friday, 3 October 2014	15:30	Quarterfinals
Friday, 3 October 2014	15:30	Semifinals
Friday, 3 October 2014	18:00	Final

== Results ==
Legend

- DQ — Won by disqualification
- P — Won by punitive declaration

=== Final ===
Final
Huang Yu-jen (TPE)	3
Kim Tae-hun (KOR)	14

=== Top half ===
Round of 32
Ramnarong Sawekwiharee (THA)	15
Aggie Seftyan Prasbowo (INA)	8
Abdul Wahab Zazai (AFG)	20
Ban Khemara (CAM)	8
Takaya Nakagawa (JPN)	6
Huang Yu-jen (TPE)	15

Round of 16
Sarvarbek Sheraliev (UZB)	8
Ramnarong Sawekwiharee (THA)	13
Doten Dorji (BHU)	13
Ulukbek Murataliev (KGZ)	10^{P}
Muatasem Abuzaid (JOR)	18
Abdul Wahab Zazai (AFG)	21
Huang Yu-jen (TPE)	30
Aleksandr Kuwarzin (TKM)	4

Quarterfinals
Ramnarong Sawekwiharee (THA)	19
Ulukbek Murataliev (KGZ)	6
Abdul Wahab Zazai (AFG)	7
Huang Yu-jen (TPE)	20

Semifinals
Ramnarong Sawekwiharee (THA)	5
Huang Yu-jen (TPE)	8

=== Bottom half ===
Round of 32
Thipphakone Kuangmany (LAO)	3
Japoy Lizardo (PHI)	10
Yeldos Yskak (KAZ)	16
Navruz Khamidov (TJK)	5
Malik Abu Al-Rob (PLE)	23
Aye Chan Wai (MYA)	11

Round of 16
Ghazanfar Ali (PAK)	14
Japoy Lizardo (PHI)	12
Yeldos Yskak (KAZ)	1
Kim Tae-hun (KOR)	14
Abdulaziz Abed (KUW)
Molomyn Tümenbayar (MGL)	DQ
Malik Abu Al-Rob (PLE)	25
Arun Adhikari (NEP)	13

Quarterfinals
Ghazanfar Ali (PAK)	1
Kim Tae-hun (KOR)	13
Molomyn Tümenbayar (MGL)	11^{P}
Malik Abu Al-Rob (PLE)	4

Semifinals
Kim Tae-hun (KOR)	19
Molomyn Tümenbayar (MGL)	4
