= Boxing at the 2014 Asian Games – Women's 51 kg =

Boxing competitions

Women's 51 kg at the 2014 Asian Games
- Venue: Seonhak Gymnasium
- Date: 27 September – 1 October 2014
- Competitors: 16 from 16 nations

Medalists
gold medal	Mary Kom	India
silver medal	Zhaina Shekerbekova	Kazakhstan
bronze medal	Lê Thị Bằng	Vietnam
bronze medal	Myagmardulamyn Nandintsetseg	Mongolia

The women's flyweight (51 kilograms) event at the 2014 Asian Games took place from 27 September to 1 October 2014 at Seonhak Gymnasium, Incheon, South Korea.

Like all Asian Games boxing events, the competition was a straight single-elimination tournament. All bouts consisted of three three-minute rounds.

A total of 16 women from 16 countries competed in this event, flyweight division, limited to fighters whose body weight was less than 51 kilograms.

Mary Kom of India won the gold medal after beating Zhaina Shekerbekova from Kazakhstan in the final bout.

== Schedule ==
All times are Korea Standard Time (UTC+09:00)

Date	Time	Event
Saturday, 27 September 2014	14:00	Preliminaries
Sunday, 28 September 2014	14:00	Quarterfinals
Tuesday, 30 September 2014	14:00	Semifinals
Wednesday, 1 October 2014	15:00	Final

== Results ==
Legend

- TKO — Won by technical knockout

Preliminaries
Lin Yu-ting (TPE)	0
Josie Gabuco (PHI)	2
Svetlana Veglina (TJK)	0
Lê Thị Bằng (VIE)	3
Sopida Satumrum (THA)	1
Si Haijuan (CHN)	2
Kim Ye-ji (KOR)	0
Mary Kom (IND)	3
Myagmardulamyn Nandintsetseg (MGL)	TKO
Minu Gurung (NEP)
Mak Kit I (MAC)	0
Erandi Gimhani (SRI)	3
Nasiba Ruzimatova (UZB)	0
Ri Hyang-mi (PRK)	3
Tomoko Kugimiya (JPN)	0
Zhaina Shekerbekova (KAZ)	3

Quarterfinals
Josie Gabuco (PHI)	0
Lê Thị Bằng (VIE)	3
Si Haijuan (CHN)	0
Mary Kom (IND)	3
Myagmardulamyn Nandintsetseg (MGL)	3
Erandi Gimhani (SRI)	0
Ri Hyang-mi (PRK)	0
Zhaina Shekerbekova (KAZ)	3

Semifinals
Lê Thị Bằng (VIE)	0
Mary Kom (IND)	3
Myagmardulamyn Nandintsetseg (MGL)	0
Zhaina Shekerbekova (KAZ)	3

Final
Mary Kom (IND)	2
Zhaina Shekerbekova (KAZ)	0
