= Taekwondo at the 2014 Asian Games – Men's 80 kg =

Taekwondo competition

Men's 80 kg at the 2014 Asian Games
- Venue: Ganghwa Dolmens Gymnasium
- Date: 1 October 2014
- Competitors: 16 from 16 nations

Medalists
gold medal	Mehdi Khodabakhshi	Iran
silver medal	Maksim Rafalovich	Uzbekistan
bronze medal	Farkhod Negmatov	Tajikistan
bronze medal	Qiao Sen	China

The men's welterweight (80 kilograms) event at the 2014 Asian Games took place on 1 October 2014 at Ganghwa Dolmens Gymnasium, Incheon, South Korea.

A total of sixteen competitors from sixteen countries competed in this event, limited to fighters whose body weight was less than 80 kilograms.

Mehdi Khodabakhshi from Islamic Republic of Iran won the gold medal after defeating Maksim Rafalovich from Uzbekistan in the gold medal match 5–1.

The bronze medal was shared by both semifinal losers Qiao Sen of People's Republics of China and Farkhod Negmatov from Tajikistan.

== Schedule ==
All times are Korea Standard Time (UTC+09:00)

Date	Time	Event
Wednesday, 1 October 2014	09:30	Round of 16
Wednesday, 1 October 2014	15:30	Quarterfinals
Wednesday, 1 October 2014	15:30	Semifinals
Wednesday, 1 October 2014	18:00	Final

== Results ==
Round of 16
Farkhod Negmatov (TJK)	6
Liu Wei-ting (TPE)	2
Naser Mohammad Ebrahim (AFG)	3
Maree Fuad Al-Radhi (YEM)	1
Dan Bahadur Airie (NEP)	0
Mehdi Khodabakhshi (IRI)	16
Hidenori Ebata (JPN)	10
Nabil Talal (JOR)	6
Maksim Rafalovich (UZB)	10
Nguyễn Văn Sơn (VIE)	4
Mahmoud Abdelrahim (QAT)	2
Christian dela Cruz (PHI)	8
Qiao Sen (CHN)	14
Atief Arshad (PAK)	5
Park Yong-hyun (KOR)	7
Anand Pandiarajan (IND)	1

Quarterfinals
Farkhod Negmatov (TJK)	14
Naser Mohammad Ebrahim (AFG)	0
Mehdi Khodabakhshi (IRI)	5
Hidenori Ebata (JPN)	1
Maksim Rafalovich (UZB)	10
Christian dela Cruz (PHI)	9
Qiao Sen (CHN)	13
Park Yong-hyun (KOR)	12

Semifinals
Farkhod Negmatov (TJK)	2
Mehdi Khodabakhshi (IRI)	7
Maksim Rafalovich (UZB)	6
Qiao Sen (CHN)	5

Final
Mehdi Khodabakhshi (IRI)	5
Maksim Rafalovich (UZB)	1
