= Taekwondo at the 2014 Asian Games – Women's +73 kg =

Taekwondo competition

Women's +73 kg at the 2014 Asian Games
- Venue: Ganghwa Dolmens Gymnasium
- Date: 3 October 2014
- Competitors: 8 from 8 nations

Medalists
gold medal	Li Donghua	China
silver medal	Akram Khodabandeh	Iran
bronze medal	Wang Junnan	Macau
bronze medal	Mokhru Khalimova	Tajikistan

The women's heavyweight (+73 kilograms) event at the 2014 Asian Games took place on 3 October 2014 at Ganghwa Dolmens Gymnasium, Incheon, South Korea.

== Schedule ==
All times are Korea Standard Time (UTC+09:00)

Date	Time	Event
Friday, 3 October 2014	14:00	Quarterfinals
Friday, 3 October 2014	15:30	Semifinals
Friday, 3 October 2014	18:00	Final

== Results ==
Quarterfinals		Semifinals		Final
Akram Khodabandeh (IRI)	8
Sorn Davin (CAM)	1	Akram Khodabandeh (IRI)	14
Nisha Rawal (NEP)	4	Wang Junnan (MAC)	2
Wang Junnan (MAC)	11			Akram Khodabandeh (IRI)	8
Maria Margerette Regi (IND)	1			Li Donghua (CHN)	10
Li Donghua (CHN)	15	Li Donghua (CHN)	7
Mokhru Khalimova (TJK)	6	Mokhru Khalimova (TJK)	1
Natalya Mamatova (UZB)	2
