= Boxing at the 2014 Asian Games – Men's 60 kg =

Boxing competitions

Men's 60 kg at the 2014 Asian Games
- Venue: Seonhak Gymnasium
- Date: 24 September – 3 October 2014
- Competitors: 24 from 24 nations

Medalists
gold medal	Dorjnyambuugiin Otgondalai	Mongolia
silver medal	Charly Suarez	Philippines
bronze medal	Satoshi Shimizu	Japan
bronze medal	Obada Al-Kasbeh	Jordan

The men's lightweight (60 kilograms) event at the 2014 Asian Games took place from 24 September to 3 October 2014 at Seonhak Gymnasium, Incheon, South Korea.

== Schedule ==
All times are Korea Standard Time (UTC+09:00)

Date	Time	Event
Wednesday, 24 September 2014	19:00	Preliminaries 1
Friday, 26 September 2014	19:00	Preliminaries 2
Monday, 29 September 2014	14:00	Quarterfinals
Thursday, 2 October 2014	14:00	Semifinals
Friday, 3 October 2014	14:00	Final

== Results ==
Legend

- DSQ — Won by disqualification
- TKO — Won by technical knockout
- WO — Won by walkover

=== Final ===
Final
Dorjnyambuugiin Otgondalai (MGL)	2
Charly Suarez (PHI)	1

=== Top half ===
Preliminaries 1

Preliminaries 2
Dorjnyambuugiin Otgondalai (MGL)	3
Şöhrat Durdyýew (TKM)	0
Alaaeddin Eryan (PLE)
Akzhol Sulaimanbek Uulu (KGZ)	WO
Ng Ka Kei (MAC)
Wang Lei (CHN)	TKO
Anvar Yunusov (TJK)
Satoshi Shimizu (JPN)	DSQ

Quarterfinals
Dorjnyambuugiin Otgondalai (MGL)	3
Akzhol Sulaimanbek Uulu (KGZ)	0
Wang Lei (CHN)	1
Satoshi Shimizu (JPN)	2

Semifinals
Dorjnyambuugiin Otgondalai (MGL)	3
Satoshi Shimizu (JPN)	0

=== Bottom half ===
Preliminaries 1
Han Soon-chul (KOR)	3
Han Sang-ryong (PRK)	0
Sailom Adi (THA)	2
Foroutan Golara (IRI)	1
Berik Abdrakhmanov (KAZ)	1
Obada Al-Kasbeh (JOR)	2
Ahmad Ali (PAK)	3
Ali Mazafar (KUW)	0
Elnur Abduraimov (UZB)	1
Charly Suarez (PHI)	2
Purna Bahadur Lama (NEP)
Akhil Kumar (IND)	TKO
Fahad Al-Naji (KSA)	0
Abdullateef Sadiq (QAT)	3
Ammar Jabbar (IRQ)	3
Tshering Wangchuk (BHU)	0

Preliminaries 2
Han Soon-chul (KOR)	3
Sailom Adi (THA)	0
Obada Al-Kasbeh (JOR)	TKO
Ahmad Ali (PAK)
Charly Suarez (PHI)	2
Akhil Kumar (IND)	1
Abdullateef Sadiq (QAT)	0
Ammar Jabbar (IRQ)	3

Quarterfinals
Han Soon-chul (KOR)	0
Obada Al-Kasbeh (JOR)	3
Charly Suarez (PHI)	3
Ammar Jabbar (IRQ)	0

Semifinals
Obada Al-Kasbeh (JOR)	1
Charly Suarez (PHI)	2
