= Wrestling at the 2014 Asian Games – Men's freestyle 97 kg =

Men's freestyle 97 kg at the 2014 Asian Games
- Venue: Dowon Gymnasium
- Date: 28 September 2014
- Competitors: 11 from 11 nations

Medalists
gold medal	Reza Yazdani	Iran
silver medal	Magomed Musaev	Kyrgyzstan
bronze medal	Dorjkhandyn Khüderbulga	Mongolia
bronze medal	Mamed Ibragimov	Kazakhstan

The men's freestyle 97 kilograms wrestling competition at the 2014 Asian Games in Incheon was held on 28 September 2014 at the Dowon Gymnasium.

This freestyle wrestling competition consisted of a single-elimination tournament, with a repechage used to determine the winner of two bronze medals. The two finalists faced off for gold and silver medals. Each wrestler who lost to one of the two finalists moved into the repechage, culminating in a pair of bronze medal matches featuring the semifinal losers each facing the remaining repechage opponent from their half of the bracket.

== Schedule ==
All times are Korea Standard Time (UTC+09:00)

Date	Time	Event
Sunday, 28 September 2014	13:00	1/8 finals
Sunday, 28 September 2014	13:00	Quarterfinals
Sunday, 28 September 2014	13:00	Semifinals
Sunday, 28 September 2014	13:00	Repechages
Sunday, 28 September 2014	19:00	Finals

== Results ==
=== Main bracket ===
1/8 finals
Magomed Musaev (KGZ)	10
Bilal Hussain Awan (PAK)	0
Rustam Iskandari (TJK)	10
Cui Xiaocheng (CHN)	0
Mamed Ibragimov (KAZ)	10
Dorn Sov (CAM)	0

Quarterfinals
Nurýagdy Karataýew (TKM)	0
Yoon Chan-uk (KOR)	5
Dorjkhandyn Khüderbulga (MGL)	0
Reza Yazdani (IRI)	6
Satyawart Kadian (IND)	2
Magomed Musaev (KGZ)	3
Rustam Iskandari (TJK)	2
Mamed Ibragimov (KAZ)	11

Semifinals
Yoon Chan-uk (KOR)	1
Reza Yazdani (IRI)	6
Magomed Musaev (KGZ)	6
Mamed Ibragimov (KAZ)	2

Gold medal
Reza Yazdani (IRI)	14
Magomed Musaev (KGZ)	4

=== Repechage ===
Repechage
Bilal Hussain Awan (PAK)	0
Satyawart Kadian (IND)	12

Bronze medals
Dorjkhandyn Khüderbulga (MGL)	7
Yoon Chan-uk (KOR)	2
Satyawart Kadian (IND)	0
Mamed Ibragimov (KAZ)	3

== Final standing ==
Rank	Athlete
1st place, gold medalist(s)	Reza Yazdani (IRI)
2nd place, silver medalist(s)	Magomed Musaev (KGZ)
3rd place, bronze medalist(s)	Dorjkhandyn Khüderbulga (MGL)
3rd place, bronze medalist(s)	Mamed Ibragimov (KAZ)
5	Yoon Chan-uk (KOR)
5	Satyawart Kadian (IND)
7	Rustam Iskandari (TJK)
8	Nurýagdy Karataýew (TKM)
9	Cui Xiaocheng (CHN)
9	Dorn Sov (CAM)
11	Bilal Hussain Awan (PAK)
