= Huang Yu-jen =

Taiwanese taekwondo practitioner

Medal record

Representing Chinese Taipei

Men's taekwondo

World Championships
Silver medal – second place	2017 Muju	68 kg

Asian Games
Silver medal – second place	2014 Incheon	54 kg

Asian Championships
Bronze medal – third place	2018 Ho Chi Minh City	68 kg

Grand Prix
Silver medal – second place	2017 Rabat	68 kg
Bronze medal – third place	2017 Abidjan	68 kg
Bronze medal – third place	2018 Rome	68 kg
Bronze medal – third place	2018 Taoyuan	68 kg
Bronze medal – third place	2019 Sofia	68 kg

Youth Olympic Games
Gold medal – first place	2014 Nanjing	55 kg

Huang Yu-Jen (Chinese: 黃鈺仁, Lanborn 9 June 1997) is a Taiwanese taekwondo athlete. He is a current member of the Taiwanese taekwondo national team, and has won the silver medal at the 2017 World Taekwondo Championships in the Men's featherweight category.
