= Taekwondo at the 2014 Asian Games – Men's +87 kg =

Taekwondo competition

Men's +87 kg at the 2014 Asian Games
- Venue: Ganghwa Dolmens Gymnasium
- Date: 1 October 2014
- Competitors: 7 from 7 nations

Medalists
gold medal	Jo Chol-ho	South Korea
silver medal	Dmitriy Shokin	Uzbekistan
bronze medal	Alisher Gulov	Tajikistan
bronze medal	Elias El-Hidari	Lebanon

The men's heavyweight (+87 kilograms) event at the 2014 Asian Games took place on 1 October 2014 at Ganghwa Dolmens Gymnasium, Incheon, South Korea.

== Schedule ==
All times are Korea Standard Time (UTC+09:00)

Date	Time	Event
Wednesday, 1 October 2014	14:00	Quarterfinals
Wednesday, 1 October 2014	15:30	Semifinals
Wednesday, 1 October 2014	18:00	Final

== Results ==
Quarterfinals		Semifinals		Final
		Dmitriy Shokin (UZB)	12
Yang Yi (CHN)	3	Alisher Gulov (TJK)	0
Alisher Gulov (TJK)	4			Dmitriy Shokin (UZB)	6
Sajjad Mardani (IRI)	5			Jo Chol-ho (KOR)	7
Jo Chol-ho (KOR)	6	Jo Chol-ho (KOR)	4
Nakul Malhotra (IND)	1	Elias El-Hidari (LIB)	0
Elias El-Hidari (LIB)	2
