= Judo at the 2014 Asian Games – Men's +100 kg =

Judo competition

Men's +100 kg at the 2014 Asian Games
- Venue: Dowon Gymnasium
- Date: 22 September 2014
- Competitors: 11 from 11 nations

Medalists
gold medal	Takeshi Ojitani	Japan
silver medal	Ölziibayaryn Düürenbayar	Mongolia
bronze medal	Abdullo Tangriev	Uzbekistan
bronze medal	Kim Sung-min	South Korea

The men's +100 kilograms (Heavyweight) competition at the 2014 Asian Games in Incheon was held on 22 September 2014 at the Dowon Gymnasium.

Takeshi Ojitani of Japan won the gold medal after beating Ölziibayaryn Düürenbayar in the final.

== Schedule ==
All times are Korea Standard Time (UTC+09:00)

Date	Time	Event
Monday, 22 September 2014	14:00	Elimination round of 16
Monday, 22 September 2014	14:00	Quarterfinals
Monday, 22 September 2014	14:00	Semifinals
Monday, 22 September 2014	14:00	Final of repechage
Monday, 22 September 2014	19:00	Finals

== Results ==
=== Main bracket ===
Elimination round of 16
Abdullo Tangriev (UZB)	100
Ho Han Boon (SIN)	000
Mukhamadmurod Abdurakhmonov (TJK)	110
Rajan Joshi (NEP)	000
Liu Jian (CHN)	110
Hudaýberdi Sahatow (TKM)	000

Quarterfinals
Kim Sung-min (KOR)	010
Abdullo Tangriev (UZB)	000
Ölziibayaryn Düürenbayar (MGL)	002
Yerzhan Shynkeyev (KAZ)	001
Iurii Krakovetskii (KGZ)	110
Mukhamadmurod Abdurakhmonov (TJK)	000
Takeshi Ojitani (JPN)	101
Liu Jian (CHN)	000

Semifinals
Kim Sung-min (KOR)	000
Ölziibayaryn Düürenbayar (MGL)	100
Iurii Krakovetskii (KGZ)	000
Takeshi Ojitani (JPN)	100

Gold medal contest
Ölziibayaryn Düürenbayar (MGL)	000
Takeshi Ojitani (JPN)	001

=== Repechage ===
Final of repechage
Abdullo Tangriev (UZB)	000
Yerzhan Shynkeyev (KAZ)	000
Mukhamadmurod Abdurakhmonov (TJK)	1000
Liu Jian (CHN)	000

Bronze medal contests
Abdullo Tangriev (UZB)	100
Iurii Krakovetskii (KGZ)	000
Mukhamadmurod Abdurakhmonov (TJK)	000
Kim Sung-min (KOR)	000
