= Mamed Ibragimov =

Kazakhstani freestyle wrestler

Personal information
- Full name: Mamed Pashaevich Ibragimov
- Nationality: Kazakhstan
- Born: Мамед Пашаевич Ибрагимов; 9 June 1992 (age 34) Pavlodar, Kazakhstan
- Height: 171 cm (5 ft 7 in)

Sport
- Country: Kazakhstan
- Sport: Wrestling
- Weight class: 97 kg
- Event: Freestyle

Achievements and titles
- Olympic finals: 8th(2016)
- World finals: 5th(2017)
- Regional finals: (bronze) (2022)
Medal record
Men's Freestyle wrestling
Representing Kazakhstan
Asian Games
| Bronze medal – third place | 2014 Incheon | 97 kg |
Asian Championships
| Bronze medal – third place | 2022 Ulaanbaatar | 97 kg |
Islamic Solidarity Games
| Bronze medal – third place | 2021 Konya | 97 kg |
Dan Kolov & Nikola Petrov Tournament
| Silver medal – second place | 2021 Plovdiv | 97 kg |
Yasar Dogu Tournament
| Bronze medal – third place | 2022 Istanbul | 97 kg |
Asian Juniors Championships
| Bronze medal – third place | 2011 Jakarta | 120 kg |
Asian Cadets Championships
| Bronze medal – third place | 2008 Tashkent | 100 kg |

Mamed Ibragimov (born 9 June 1992 in Pavlodar region, Kazakhstan) is a Kazakhstani freestyle wrestler (Azerbaijani origin). He competed in the men's freestyle 97 kg event at the 2016 Summer Olympics, in which he was eliminated in the quarterfinals by Elizbar Odikadze. Mamed is 2014 Asian Games bronze medalist.
