= Mehdi Khodabakhshi =

Iranian taekwondo practitioner

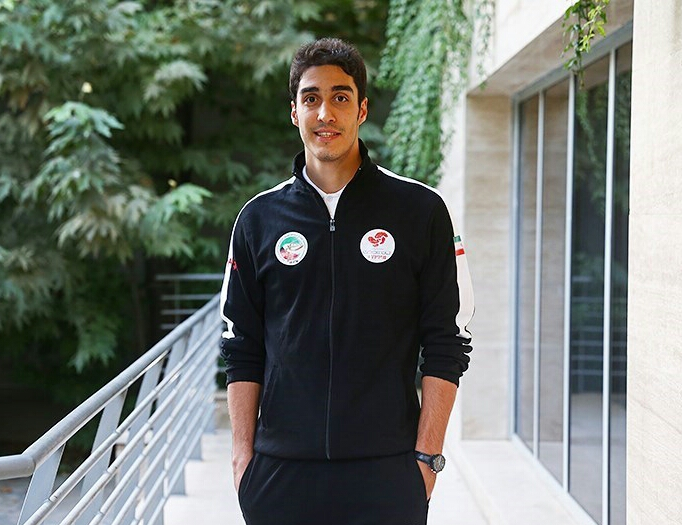

Personal information
- Native name: مهدی خدابخشی; Мехди Ходабахши
- Nationality: Iranian, Serbian
- Born: 21 April 1991 (age 35) Tonekabon, Iran
- Height: 190 cm (6 ft 3 in)

Sport
- Sport: Taekwondo
Medal record
Event	1st	2nd	3rd
World Championships	2	–	–
European Championships	-	1	-
Asian Games	1	–	–
Asian Championships	1	–	1
World Cup	–	–	1
World Grand Prix	3	1	1
Representing Serbia
World Championships
Gold medal – first place	2022 Guadalajara	87 kg
European Championships
Silver medal – second place	2021 Sofia	87 kg
Representing Iran
World Championships
Gold medal – first place	2015 Chelyabinsk	80 kg
Asian Games
Gold medal – first place	2014 Incheon	80 kg
Asian Championships
Gold medal – first place	2014 Tashkent	80 kg
Bronze medal – third place	2018 Ho Chi Minh City	80 kg
Islamic Solidarity Games
Gold medal – first place	2013 Palembang	+87 kg

Mehdi Khodabakhshi (Persian: مهدی خدابخشی, Serbian Cyrillic: Махди Ходабахши; born April 21, 1991, in Tonekabon, Iran) is an Iranian-born Serbian Taekwondo practitioner. He was two times world champion, in 2014 and in 2022.

== Career ==
He represented Iran until 2019 when he switched allegiance by representing Serbia through naturalisation. He has been involved in the sport for more than 15 years. He has beaten several Taekwondo notables such as Aaron Cook and Steven Lopez and was the world champion. Additionally, he won the gold medal in the welterweight division in the 2014 Asian Games in Incheon. He is a participant of the 2016 Rio Olympics, but lost in the 1/04-Final against the Iranian born Azeri Milad Beigi He won his second world title in 2022 World Taekwondo Championships, first time representing Serbia.
