= Yoon Jeong-yeon =

South Korean taekwondo practitioner

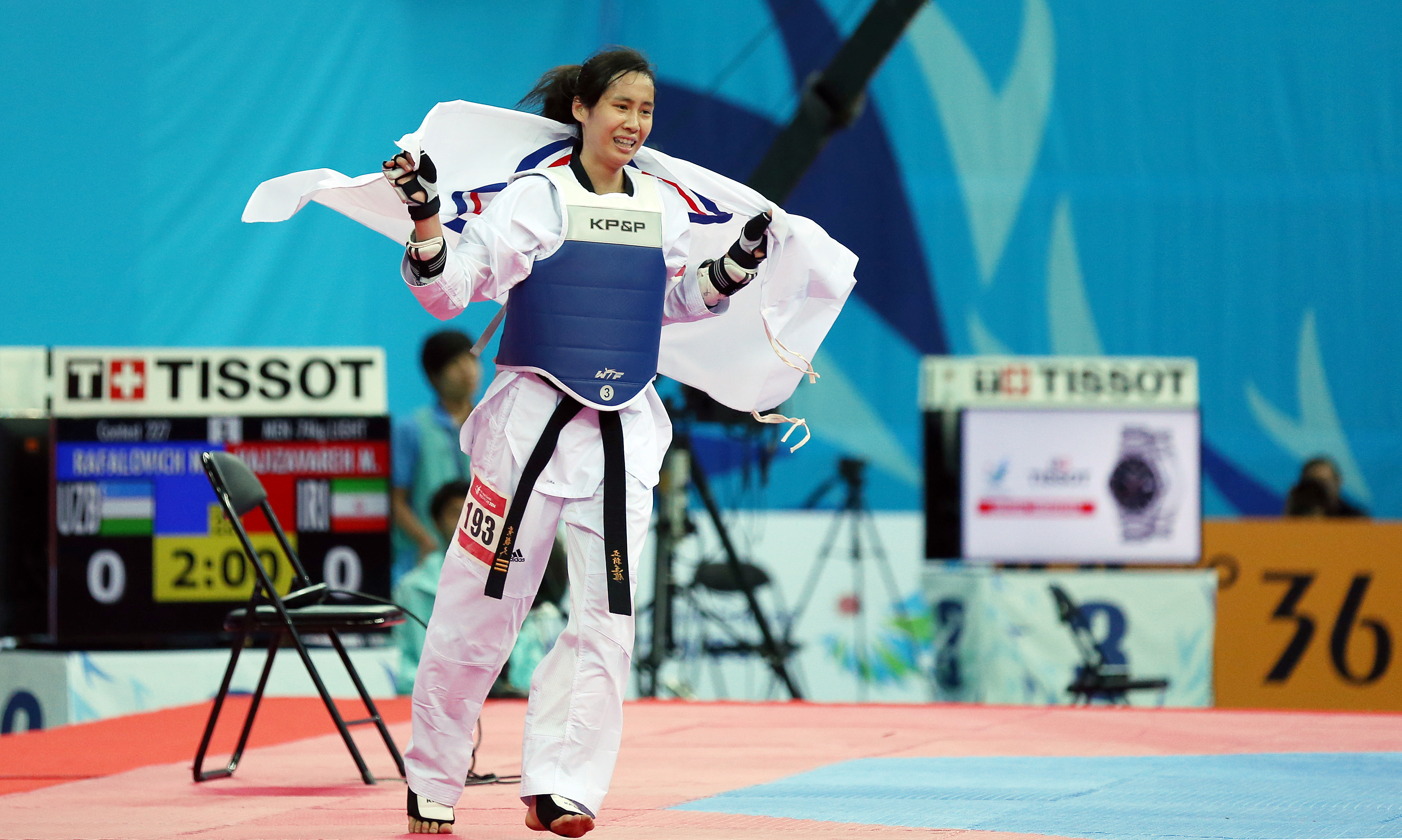
- Yoon in 2014

Personal information
- Born: November 9, 1992 (age 33)

Sport
- Country: South Korea
- Sport: Taekwondo
Medal record
Women's taekwondo
Representing South Korea
Asian Games
Silver medal – second place	2014 Incheon	Bantamweight
Asian Championships
Gold medal – first place	2014 Tashkent	Bantamweight

Yoon Jeong-yeon (born 9 November 1992) is a South Korean female taekwondo practitioner. She won a silver medal at the Asian Games in the women's 53 kg event.
