= Akram Khodabandeh =

Iranian taekwondo practitioner

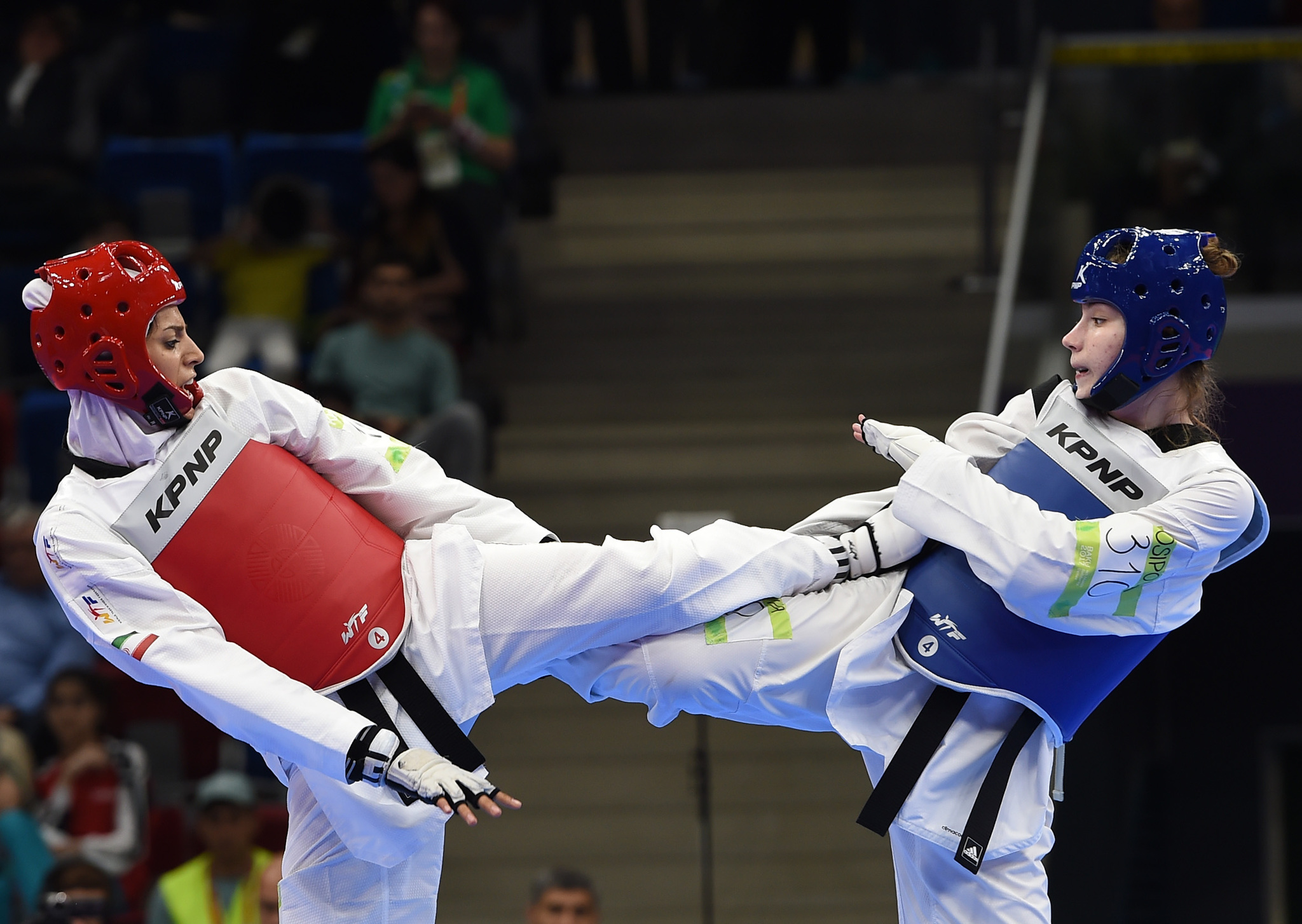
- Khodabandeh in left

Personal information
- Full name: Akram Khodabandeh
- Born: 25 September 1991 (age 34) Karaj, Iran

Sport
- Country: Iran
- Sport: Taekwondo
Medal record
Representing Iran
Asian Games
Silver medal – second place	2014 Incheon	+73 kg
Asian Championships
Gold medal – first place	2022 Chuncheon	+73 kg
Silver medal – second place	2014 Tashkent	+73 kg
Universiade
Gold medal – first place	2015 Gwangju	+73 kg
Islamic Solidarity Games
Gold medal – first place	2013 Palembang	+73 kg
Silver medal – second place	2017 Baku	+73 kg
Silver medal – second place	2021 Konya	+73 kg

Akram Khodabandeh (Persian: اکرم خدابنده, born 25 September 1991, in Karaj) is the captain of the Iranian women's national taekwondo team.

== Career ==
She started Taekwondo in 2008 and after 9 months of training, she won the first place in the national youth team selection competitions and in 2010 she became a member of the Iranian women's national taekwondo team. She became the runner-up in The 3rd Asian University Taekwondo Championship 2011 and since then has been the champion or runner-up in various competitions including the Asian Championship, World Military Championships, Islamic Solidarity Games, World Student Games (Universiade), and since 2014 has been the captain of the Iranian women's national taekwondo team.

Khodabandeh is a student of mechanical engineering and is the only Iranian female taekwondo fighter to have won the Universiade.
