= Farkhod Negmatov =

Tajikistani taekwondo practitioner

Personal information
- Born: 22 November 1989 (age 36) Vahdat, Tajikistan

Sport
- Sport: Taekwondo
Medal record
Men's taekwondo
Representing Tajikistan
Asian Games
| Bronze medal – third place | 2014 Incheon | 80 kg |

Farkhod Negmatov (born 22 November 1989 in Vahdat) is a Tajikistani taekwondo practitioner. He competed in the 80 kg event at the 2012 Summer Olympics and was eliminated in the preliminary round by Lutalo Muhammad.
