= Alisher Gulov =

Tajikistani taekwondo practitioner

Personal information
- Born: 24 August 1989 (age 37) Dushanbe, Tajikistan
- Height: 189 cm (6 ft 2 in)

Sport
- Sport: Taekwondo
Medal record
Men's taekwondo
Representing Tajikistan
Asian Games
Bronze medal – third place	2014 Incheon	+87 kg
Asian Taekwondo Championships
Silver medal – second place	2010 Astana	Men's -80kg

Alisher Gulov (born 24 August 1989 in Dushanbe) is a Tajikistani taekwondo practitioner. He competed in the +80 kg event at the 2012 Summer Olympics; he was defeated by Carlo Molfetta in the preliminary round and was eliminated by Liu Xiaobo in the repechage contest.

He is also the current Vice-President of the Tajikistan Taekwondo Federation. In 2019 he coached several students to medals in the USA AAU National Championships.
