= Edi Kusdaryanto =

Indonesian tennis player (born 1975)

- Country (sports): Indonesia
- Born: 9 May 1975 (age 51) Bondowoso, East Java

Singles
- Highest ranking: No. 1176 (10 Jun 1996)

Doubles
- Career record: 0–1 (ATP Tour)
- Highest ranking: No. 567 (4 Mar 1996)
Medal record
Tennis
Southeast Asian Games
Bronze medal – third place	1995 Chiang Mai	Men's doubles
Bronze medal – third place	1995 Chiang Mai	Men's team
Soft tennis
Southeast Asian Games
Gold medal – first place	2011 Palembang	Mixed doubles
Gold medal – first place	2011 Palembang	Men's doubles
Gold medal – first place	2011 Palembang	Men's team
Asian Games
Silver medal – second place	2014 Incheon	Men's singles

Edi Kusdaryanto (born 9 May 1975) is an Indonesian former professional tennis player. He represented Indonesia in the Davis Cup and made an ATP Tour main draw appearance in the doubles of the 1996 Indonesia Open.

Kusdaryanto featured in the doubles rubber in four Davis Cup ties and was unbeaten. On his Davis Cup debut in 1996 he partnered with Suwandi, to a win over South Korea's Chang Eui-jong and Lee Hyung-taik. For his three other rubbers, across 1999 and 2000, he teamed up with Hendri Susilo Pramono.

Later in his career he took up the sport of soft tennis and had success in regional competitions. He won three gold medals in soft tennis at the 2011 Southeast Asian Games and was the singles silver medalist at the 2014 Asian Games.

== See also ==
- List of Indonesia Davis Cup team representatives
