= Philippines at the 2014 Asian Games =

- IOC code: PHI
- NOC: Philippine Olympic Committee
- Website: www.olympic.ph (in English)

in Incheon
- Competitors: 159 in 25 sports
- Flag bearer: Geylord Coveta
- Medals Ranked 22nd: Gold 1 Silver 3 Bronze 11 Total 15

Asian Games appearances (overview)
- 1951; 1954; 1958; 1962; 1966; 1970; 1974; 1978; 1982; 1986; 1990; 1994; 1998; 2002; 2006; 2010; 2014; 2018; 2022; 2026

The Philippines participated in the 2014 Asian Games in Incheon, South Korea, held from 19 September to 4 October 2014. For the first time since Bangkok at the 1998 Asian Games, the country produced only one gold medal in the history of the country's participation in the games.

== Asian Games Performance ==
Daniel Caluag, a Filipino Olympian at the 2012 Summer Olympics, saved the Philippine team from the gold medal drought by winning the first place in the BMX cycling. This is also the Philippines' first gold medal in cycling in the entire history of Asian Games.

For the first time since 2002 (also held in South Korea), no Filipino boxer won the gold in a single Asian Games. Charly Suarez was beaten out by Mongolia's Otgondalai Dornjyambuu, in which the former settled for silver. The Philippine Basketball team was placed 7th, the poorest finish for the country in the history of Asian Games (the record was later broken in 2026 Asian Games where they finished 9th place.)

Ranked at No. 22 overall, the Philippines placed seventh behind Southeast Asian Asiad powerhouse Thailand, which is followed by Malaysia, Singapore, Indonesia, Myanmar and Vietnam. The Philippines is among the eight Southeast Asian teams to win at least one gold, with Cambodia winning its first gold medal and the only medal for that country in this games.

== Medalists ==
=== Gold ===
No.	Medal	Name	Sport	Event	Date
1	Gold	Daniel Caluag	Cycling	BMX Race	1 October

=== Silver ===
No.	Medal	Name	Sport	Event	Date
1	Silver	Charly Suarez	Boxing	Men's Lightweight	3 October
2	Silver	Daniel Parantac	Wushu	Men's Taijijian/Taijiquan	23 September
3	Silver	Jean Claude Saclag	Wushu	Men's Sanda -60kg	24 September

=== Bronze ===
No.	Medal	Name	Sport	Event	Date
1	Bronze	Paul Marton Dela Cruz	Archery	Men's individual compound	27 September
2	Bronze	Mark Anthony Barriga	Boxing	Men's Light Flyweight	2 October
3	Bronze	Mario Fernandez	Boxing	Men's Bantamweight	2 October
4	Bronze	Wilfredo Lopez	Boxing	Men's Middleweight	2 October
5	Bronze	Mae Soriano	Karate	Women's kumite -55kg	3 October
6	Bronze	Levita Ronna Ilao	Taekwondo	Women's -49kg	30 September
7	Bronze	Samuel Morrison	Taekwondo	Men's -74kg	30 September
8	Bronze	Mary Anjelay Pelaez	Taekwondo	Women's -46kg	1 October
9	Bronze	Benjamin Keith Sembrano	Taekwondo	Men's -68kg	2 October
10	Bronze	Kirstie Elaine Alora	Taekwondo	Women's -73kg	3 October
11	Bronze	Francisco Solis	Wushu	Men's Sanda -56kg	23 September

== Medal summary ==
=== Medal by sports ===
Sport	1st place, gold medalist(s)	2nd place, silver medalist(s)	3rd place, bronze medalist(s)	Total
Cycling	1	0	0	1
Wushu	0	2	1	3
Taekwondo	0	0	5	5
Archery	0	0	1	1
Boxing	0	1	3	4
Karate	0	0	1	1
Total	1	3	11	15

=== Medal by Date ===
Medals by date
Day	Date	1st place, gold medalist(s)	2nd place, silver medalist(s)	3rd place, bronze medalist(s)	Total
1	20 Sep	0	0	0	0
2	21 Sep	0	0	0	0
3	22 Sep	0	0	0	0
4	23 Sep	0	1	1	2
5	24 Sep	0	1	0	1
6	25 Sep	0	0	0	0
7	26 Sep	0	0	0	0
8	27 Sep	0	0	1	1
9	28 Sep	0	0	0	0
10	29 Sep	0	0	0	0
11	30 Sep	0	0	2	2
12	1 Oct	1	0	1	2
13	2 Oct	0	0	4	4
14	3 Oct	0	1	2	3
15	4 Oct	0	0	0	0
Total		1	3	11	15

== Archery ==
=== Men's ===
Athlete	Event	Ranking Round		Round of 64	Round of 32	Round of 16	Quarterfinals	Semifinals	Final
Athlete	Event	Total Score	Seed	Opposition Score	Opposition Score	Opposition Score	Opposition Score	Opposition Score	Opposition Score
Ian Patrick Chipeco	Men's Compound Individual	684	25	Did not advance					
Earl Benjamin Yap	Men's Compound Individual	688	19	BYE	Chang (HKG); W 144-141	Dela Cruz (PHI); L 141-145	Did not advance		
Jose Ferdinand Adriano	Men's Compound Individual	675	30	Did not advance					
Paul Marton Dela Cruz	Men's Compound Individual	701	4	BYE	Alabadi (QAT); W 141-138	Yap (PHI); W 145-141	Kumar (IND); W 141-135	Ebadi (IRI); L 224-227	Mahazan (MAS); W 140-139; Bronze
Paul Marton Dela Cruz; Jose Ferdinand Adriano; Earl Benjamin Yap; Ian Patrick Chipeco	Men's Compound Team	2073	4			Laos (LAO); W 225-214	Chinese Taipei (TPE); W 229-226	South Korea (KOR); L 227-228	Iran (IRI); L 224-227

=== Women's ===
Athlete	Event	Qualification Round		Round of 64	Round of 32	Round of 16	Quarterfinals	Semifinals	Final
Athlete	Event	Score	Seed	Opposition Score	Opposition Score	Opposition Score	Opposition Score	Opposition Score	Opposition Score
Amaya Amparo Cojuangco	Women's Compound Individual	674	18		Detsone (LAO); W 137-128	Huang (TPE) L 142-140	Did not advance		
Joann Tabanag	Women's Compound Individual	668	24	Did not advance					
Abigail Tindugan	Women's Compound Individual	676	16		Yaw (MYA); W 139-134	Threesyadinda (INA); L 138-136	Did not advance		
Abigail Tindugan; Joann Tabanag; Amaya Amparo Cojuangco	Women's Compound Team	2018	6			BYE	Chinese Taipei (TPE); L 215-226	Did not advance	

== Athletics ==
Track events

Event	Athletes	Heat Round 1		Semifinal		Final	
Event	Athletes	Result	Rank	Result	Rank	Result	Rank
400 m	Archand Christian Bagsit	46.88	4th QF	47.56	8th	Did not advance	
400 m	Edgardo Alejan Jr	47.29	4th QF	47.07	6th	Did not advance	

== Basketball ==
2014 Philippines Asian Games basketball team
- Head coach: Chot Reyes
- 2014 Asian Games: 7th Place

The 2014 Philippines men's Asian Games basketball team, was a Filipino Asian Games team assembled for the basketball competition on 2014 Asian Games.

=== Men ===
Philippines men's national basketball team - 2014 Asian Games roster
Players
Coaches

Pos.	No.	Name	Age – Date of birth	Height	Club
PG	4	Jimmy Alapag (C)	36 – 30 December 1977	1.74 m (5 ft 9 in)	Talk 'N Text Tropang Texters	(Philippines)
PG	5	LA Tenorio	30 – 9 July 1984	1.70 m (5 ft 7 in)	Barangay Ginebra San Miguel	(Philippines)
SG	6	Jeffrei Chan	31 – 11 February 1983	1.88 m (6 ft 2 in)	Rain or Shine Elasto Painters	(Philippines)
F	7	Jared Dillinger	30 – 6 January 1984	1.96 m (6 ft 5 in)	Meralco Bolts	(Philippines)
G/F	8	Gary David	36 – 13 July 1978	1.85 m (6 ft 1 in)	Meralco Bolts	(Philippines)
F	9	Ranidel de Ocampo	32 – 8 December 1981	1.95 m (6 ft 5 in)	Talk 'N Text Tropang Texters	(Philippines)
F	10	Gabe Norwood	29 – 9 February 1985	1.96 m (6 ft 5 in)	Rain or Shine Elasto Painters	(Philippines)
C	11	Marcus Douthit	34 – 15 April 1980	2.10 m (6 ft 11 in)	Free agent
C	12	June Mar Fajardo	24 – 17 November 1989	2.08 m (6 ft 10 in)	San Miguel Beermen	(Philippines)
G	13	Paul Lee	25 – 14 February 1989	1.85 m (6 ft 1 in)	Rain or Shine Elasto Painters	(Philippines)
F/C	14	Japeth Aguilar	27 – 25 January 1987	2.06 m (6 ft 9 in)	Barangay Ginebra San Miguel	(Philippines)
PF	15	Marc Pingris	32 – 16 October 1981	1.95 m (6 ft 5 in)	San Mig Super Coffee Mixers	(Philippines)

Head coach

- (Philippines) Chot Reyes

Assistant coach(es)

- (Philippines) Jong Uichico
- (Philippines) Nash Racela
- (Philippines) Josh Reyes

Legend

- (C) Team captain
- Club – describes last
  club before the tournament
- Age – describes age
  on September 19, 2014
- Source: incheon2014ag.org

Preliminary round

Group E

Team	Pld	W	L	PF	PA	PD	Pts
Iran	2	2	0	144	104	+40	4
Philippines	2	1	1	148	144	+4	3
India	2	0	2	117	161	−44	2

23 September
14:00

Boxscore

Philippines	85–76	India
Scoring by quarter: 24–15, 26–22, 20–19, 15–20
Pts: Douthit, Chan 14; Rebs: Douthit 10; Asts: Alapag, Norwood 3		Pts: Al. Singh 16; Rebs: Bhriguvanshi 6 Asts: Bhriguvanshi 5

Hwaseong Sports Complex, Hwaseong
Referees: Arsen Andryushkin (KAZ), Kijun Sung (KOR), Hsieh Wen Wei (TPE)

25 September
14:00

Boxscore

Iran	68–63	Philippines
Scoring by quarter: 29–17, 7–17, 14–19, 18–10
Pts: Nikkhah Bahrami 21; Rebs: Haddadi 15; Asts: Nikkhah Bahrami 5		Pts: Lee 11; Rebs: Douthit 10; Asts: Tenorio 2

Hwaseong Sports Complex, Hwaseong
Referees: Mansour Saeed Alahmari (KSA), Hwang Intae (KOR), Hsieh Wen Wei (TPE)

Quarterfinals

Group H

Team	Pld	W	L	PF	PA	PD	Pts	Tie
South Korea	3	3	0	239	213	+26	6	
Kazakhstan	3	1	2	190	201	−11	4	1–1; 1.048
Qatar	3	1	2	192	198	−6	4	1–1; 1.008
Philippines	3	1	2	230	239	−9	4	1–1; 0.951

26 September
18:30

Boxscore

Philippines	68–77	Qatar
Scoring by quarter: 19–19, 20–17, 12–20, 17–21
Pts: Alapag 15; Rebs: Pingris 8 Asts: Alapag, de Ocampo 3		Pts: Mohamed 19; Rebs: Mohamed 8 Asts: Watson, El Hadary 3

Hwaseong Sports Complex, Hwaseong
Referees: Harja Jaladri (INA), Man Lei Si (MAC), Mohammadreza Salehian (IRI)

27 September
14:00

Boxscore

South Korea	97–95	Philippines
Scoring by quarter: 18–22, 26–29, 27–21, 26–23
Pts: Moon 38; Rebs: Oh 8 Asts: Kim T.S. 5		Pts: Alapag 25; Rebs: Fajardo 10; Asts: Norwood 5

Samsan World Gymnasium, Incheon
Referees: Mohammad Alamiri (KUW), Yang Hongfeng (CHN), Mohammadreza Salehian (IRI)

28 September
15:15

Boxscore

Philippines	67–65	Kazakhstan
Scoring by quarter: 14–8, 21–13, 17–18, 15–26
Pts: Douthit 18; Rebs: Douthit 14; Asts: three players 2		Pts: Ilin 21; Rebs: Kolesnikov, Ponomarev 10; Asts: Ilin 4

Hwaseong Sports Complex, Hwaseong
Referees: Yuji Higashi (JPN), Girok Shin (KOR), Reza Azarafza (IRI)

Classification round

Semifinal
29 September – Samsan
Mongolia	78
Qatar	87
29 September – Hwaseong
China	78
Philippines	71

5th place game
1 October – Samsan
Qatar	60
China	70
7th place game
1 October – Hwaseong
Mongolia	68
Philippines	84

Semifinals 5th−8th

29 September
16:15

Boxscore

China	78–71	Philippines
Scoring by quarter: 21–17, 21–17, 23–19, 13–18
Pts: Liu 16; Rebs: Zhou Q. 9 Asts: Liu 5		Pts: Douthit 24; Rebs: Tenorio 10; Asts: Tenorio 3

Hwaseong Sports Complex, Hwaseong
Referees: Mohammad Alamiri (KUW), Jongkuk Kim (KOR), Mohammadreza Salehian (IRI)

7th place game

1 October
15:15

Boxscore

Mongolia	68–84	Philippines
Scoring by quarter: 21–18, 9–20, 25–25, 13–21
Pts: Battuvshin 18; Rebs: Davaasambuu 7 Asts: Otgonbaatar 4		Pts: de Ocampo 25; Rebs: Fajardo 12; Asts: de Ocampo 7

Hwaseong Sports Complex, Hwaseong
Referees: Reza Azarafza (IRI), Seungmu Lee (KOR), Kyoungjin Park (KOR)

== Bowling ==
=== Men ===
Athlete	Event	Games 1–6						Total	Average	Rank
Athlete	Event	1	2	3	4	5	6	Total	Average	Rank
Jo Mar Roland Jumapao	Men's singles	160	152	209	207	166	204	1098	183	76th
Frederick Ong	Men's singles	268	199	192	205	201	163	1228	204.67	18th
Enrico Lorenzo Hernandez	Men's singles	186	191	204	224	221	189	1215	202.5	23rd
Benshir Layoso	Men's singles	177	190	185	186	232	190	1160	193.33	54th
Kenneth Chua	Men's singles	223	160	204	191	203	190	1171	195.17	48th
Engelberto Rivera	Men's singles	211	183	185	198	176	205	1158	193	55th
Jo Mar Roland Jumapao; Benshir Layoso	Men's doubles	193; 167	202; 165	205; 166	140; 191	183; 197	178; 182	2169	183.5; 178	39th
Frederick Ong; Enrico Lorenzo Hernandez	Men's doubles	173; 159	162; 159	188; 203	227; 213	221; 258	160; 226	2349	188.5; 203	17th
Kenneth Chua; Engelberto Rivera	Men's doubles	171; 212	170; 172	225; 193	190; 180	176; 198	204; 234	2325	189.33; 198.17	22nd
Jo Mar Roland Jumapao; Benshir Layoso; Enrico Lorenzo Hernandez	Men's Trio	221; 165; 181	213; 202; 210	208; 168; 207	179; 207; 211	201; 212; 190	186; 178; 180	3519	201.33; 188.67; 196.50	13th
Kenneth Chua; Engelberto Rivera; Frederick Ong	Men's Trio	180; 234; 192	224; 219; 190	192; 185; 203	228; 190; 198	224; 180; 223	190; 221; 185	3658	206.33; 204.83; 198.50	9th
Engelberto Rivera; Frederick Ong; Kenneth Chua; Jo Mar Roland Jumapao; Enrico Lorenzo Hernandez	Men's team of five	179	226	178	193	193	179	1148	191.33	8th
Engelberto Rivera; Frederick Ong; Kenneth Chua; Jo Mar Roland Jumapao; Enrico Lorenzo Hernandez	Men's team of five	190	193	170	158	186	170	1067	177.83	8th
Engelberto Rivera; Frederick Ong; Kenneth Chua; Jo Mar Roland Jumapao; Enrico Lorenzo Hernandez	Men's team of five	213	210	214	169	177	240	1223	203.83	8th
Engelberto Rivera; Frederick Ong; Kenneth Chua; Jo Mar Roland Jumapao; Enrico Lorenzo Hernandez	Men's team of five	189	213	222	153	167	266	1210	201.67	8th
Engelberto Rivera; Frederick Ong; Kenneth Chua; Jo Mar Roland Jumapao; Enrico Lorenzo Hernandez	Men's team of five	207	182	183	234	160	213	11179	1906.50	8th
Benshir Layoso	Men's team of five booster	192	155	204	205	196	234	1186	197.67	

All events

Athlete	Event	Singles	Doubles	Trío	Team	Total	Average	Rank
Kenneth Chua	Men's all events	1171 1136 1238 1223 4768 198.67	1136	1238	1223	4768	198.67	29th
Engelberto Rivera	Men's all events	1158	1189	1229	1148	4724	196.83	35th
Enrico Lorenzo Hernandez	Men's all events	1215	1131	1179	1179	4704	196.00	38th
Frederick Ong	Men's all events	1228	1218	1191	1067	4704	196.00	52nd
Jo Mar Roland Jumapao	Men's all events	1098	1101	1208	1210	4617	192.38	48th
Benshir Layoso	Men's all events	1160	1068	1132	1186	4546	189.42	54th

=== Women ===
Athlete	Event	Games 1–6						Total	Average	Rank
Athlete	Event	1	2	3	4	5	6	Total	Average	Rank
Marie Alexis Sy	Women's singles	186	171	195	183	211	182	1128	188.00	20th
Anne Marie Kiac	Women's singles	207	148	178	191	155	181	1060	176.67	29th
Liza Clutario	Women's singles	59	171	215	179	194	184	1102	183.67	20th
Maria Liza del Rosario	Women's singles	200	175	167	180	207	221	1150	191.67	16th
Krizziah Lyn Tabora	Women's singles	210	178	150	194	180	155	1067	177.83	24th
Marian Lara Posadas	Women's singles	237	170	176	194	200	181	1158	193.00	15th
Anne Marie Kiac; Liza Clutario	Women's doubles	164; 204	148; 204	204; 176	185; 258	145; 179	160; 188	2215	167.67; 201.50	24th
Maria Liza del Rosario; Marian Lara Posadas	Women's doubles	144; 172	214; 204	227; 179	214; 171	179; 185	161; 225	2274	189.83; 189.17	20th
Marie Alexis Sy; Krizziah Lyn Tabora	Women's doubles	220; 144	172; 212	200; 168	187; 168	185; 151	196; 170	2173	201.50; 168.83	25th
Anne Marie Kiac; Marie Alexis Sy; Krizziah Lyn Tabora	Women's Trio	173; 178; 168	173; 179; 222	157; 216; 222	180; 169; 188	163; 234; 190	180; 196; 239	3427	171; 195.33; 204.83	13th
Liza Clutario; Maria Liza del Rosario; Marian Lara Posadas	Women's Trio	164; 222; 182	210; 212; 159	184; 200; 198	192; 179; 222	192; 197; 200	196; 181; 194	3484	189.67; 198.50; 192.50	11th
Maria Liza del Rosario; Marie Alexis Sy; Liza Clutario; Krizziah Lyn Tabora; Marian Lara Posadas	Women's team of five	206	146	165	199	208	216	1140	190.00	8th
Maria Liza del Rosario; Marie Alexis Sy; Liza Clutario; Krizziah Lyn Tabora; Marian Lara Posadas	Women's team of five	187	221	191	186	221	208	1214	202.33	8th
Maria Liza del Rosario; Marie Alexis Sy; Liza Clutario; Krizziah Lyn Tabora; Marian Lara Posadas	Women's team of five	169	179	244	196	206	201	1195	199.17	8th
Maria Liza del Rosario; Marie Alexis Sy; Liza Clutario; Krizziah Lyn Tabora; Marian Lara Posadas	Women's team of five	147	181	180	201	195	190	1094	182.33	8th
Maria Liza del Rosario; Marie Alexis Sy; Liza Clutario; Krizziah Lyn Tabora; Marian Lara Posadas	Women's team of five	178	190	200	215	180	181	1144	190.67	8th
Anne Marie Kiac	Women's team of five booster	180	185	173	164	172	185	1059	176.50	

All events

Athlete	Event	Singles	Doubles	Trío	Team	Total	Average	Rank
Marie Alexis Sy	Women's all events	1128	1160	1172	1214	4674	194.75	25th
Clutario Liza	Women's all events	1102	1209	1138	1195	4644	193.50	31st
Maria Liza del Rosario	Women's all events	1150	1139	1191	1140	4620	192.50	34th
Marian Lara Posadas	Women's all events	1158	1135	1155	1144	4592	191.33	38th
Krizziah Lyn Tabora	Women's all events	1067	1013	1229	1094	4403	183.46	52nd
Anne Marie Kiac	Women's all events	1060	1006	1026	1059	4151	172.96	60th

Masters

Athlete	Event	Block 1 (Games 1–8)								Block 2 (Games 1–8)								Grand total	Average	Rank	Stepladder 2nd - 3rd place	Stepladder 1st - 2nd place
Athlete	Event	1	2	3	4	5	6	7	8	1	2	3	4	5	6	7	8	Grand total	Average	Rank	Opposition Score	Opposition Score
Marie Alexis Sy	Women's masters	158; 0	183; 0	205; 10	149; 0	183; 0	192; 10	157; 0	150; 0	167; 0	195; 0	230; 0	172; 0	162; 0	202; 0	193; 0	225; 10	2953	182.69	16th		

== Boxing ==
Athlete	Event	Round of 32	Round of 16	Quarterfinals	Semifinals	Final
Athlete	Event	Opposition Result	Opposition Result	Opposition Result	Opposition Result	Opposition Result
Mario Fernandez	Men's Bantamweight	Donchai Thathi (THA); W 3-0	Puran Rai (NEP); W 3-0	Shiva Thapa (IND); W 3-0	Zhang Jiawei (CHN); L 0-3; Bronze	Did not advance
Charly Suarez	Men's Lightweight	Elnur Abduraimov (UZB); W 2-1	Akhil Kumar (IND); W 2-1	Ammar Jabbar Hasan Hasan (IRQ); W 3-0	ALKASBEH Obada Mohammad Mustafa (JOR); W 2-1	DORJNYAMBUU Otgondalai (MGL); L 1-2; Silver
Ian Clark Bautista	Men's Flyweight	Abdallah Maher Mohammad Shamon (JOR); W 3-0	Choe Sangdon (KOR); L 0-3	Did not advance		
Wilfredo Lopez	Men's Middleweight	Aziz Azilov (TKM); W 2-1	Waheed Abdulridha Waheed Waheed (IRQ); W 3-0	Shinebayar Narmandakh (MGL); W TKO	ALHINDAWI Odai Riyad Adel (JOR); L 1-2; Bronze	Did not advance
Mark Anthony Barriga	Men's Light Flyweight	Hussin Al Masri (SYR); W 2-1	Tosho Kashiwasaki (JPN); W 3-0	Hasanboy Dusmatov (UZB); W 2-1	Shin Jong-hun (KOR); L 0-3; Bronze	Did not advance
Dennis Galvan	Men's Light Welterweight	Chinzorig Baatarsukh (MGL); L 0-3	Did not advance			
Josie Gabuco	Women's Flyweight		Lin Yu Ting (TPE); W 2-0	Le Thi Bang (VIE); L 0-3	Did not advance	
Nesthy Petecio	Women's Flyweight		Gulzhaina Ubbiniyazova (KAZ); W 3-0	Yin Junhua (CHN); L 0-3	Did not advance	

== Canoeing ==
Men

Athlete	Event	Heats		Semifinals		Finals	
Athlete	Event	Time	Rank	Time	Rank	Time	Rank
Hermie Macaranas (PHI)	Canoe Single; Men's 1000m	4:34.409	5th	4:22.704	4th	Did not advance	
Hermie Macaranas (PHI)	Canoe Single; Men's 200m	Did not finish		Did not advance			

== Cycling ==
=== BMX ===
Athlete	Event	Qualifying	Final
Athlete	Event	Time	Rank
Daniel Caluag	Men's individual	35.277	1st place, gold medalist(s)
Christopher Caluag	Men's individual	37.377	4

=== Road ===
Athlete	Event	Time	Rank
Mark Galedo	Men's Individual Time Trial	55:45.91	13th
Ronald Oranza	Men's Road Race	4:10:47	13th
Mark Galedo	Men's Road Race	4:17:10	33rd

== Equestrian ==
=== Qualifications ===
Athlete	Event	Horse	1st qualifier			2nd qualifier			Total	Rank
Athlete	Event	Horse	Jump	Time	Total	Jump	Time	Total	Total	Rank
Joker Arroyo (PHI)	Individual Jumping	Didi De Goedereede	0	0	0	8	1	9	9	20 Q
Martin Diego Lorenzo Jr (PHI)	Individual Jumping	HS Contino	0	1	1	4	1	5	6	15 Q
Marie Antonette Leviste (PHI)	Individual Jumping	Maximillian	0	1	1	4	1	5	6	15 Q
Mateo Rafael Lorenzo (PHI)	Individual Jumping	Carlie 3	12	1	13	4	1	5	18	31

=== Finals ===
Athlete	Event	Horse	1st qualifier			2nd qualifier			Total	Rank
Athlete	Event	Horse	Jump	Time	Total	Jump	Time	Total	Total	Rank
Joker Arroyo (PHI)	Team Jumping	Didi De Goedereede	0	0	0	~~8~~	~~1~~	~~9~~	9	5th
Martin Diego Lorenzo Jr (PHI)	Team Jumping	HS Contino	0	1	1	4	1	5	6	5th
Marie Antonette Leviste (PHI)	Team Jumping	Maximillian	0	1	1	4	1	5	6	5th
Mateo Rafael Lorenzo (PHI)	Team Jumping	Carlie 3	~~12~~	~~1~~	~~13~~	4	1	5	18	5th

== Fencing ==
=== Men ===
Athlete	Event	Round of Pool	Round of 32	Round of 16	Quarterfinals	Semifinals	Final	
Athlete	Event	Result	Opposition Score	Opposition Score	Opposition Score	Opposition Score	Opposition Score	Rank
Nathaniel Perez	Individual foil	5W 1L; Q	Bye	Almansoori (UAE) L 11-15	Did not advance			
Wilfred Richard Curioso	Individual foil	1W 3L; Q	Bidarev (KAZ); W 15-14	Chen (CHN); L 5-15	Did not advance			

== Golf ==
Men

Athlete	Event	Round 1	Round 2	Round 3	Round 4	Total	Par	Rank
Ruperto Zaragoza III	Individual	72 (E)	74 (+2)	71 (-1)	67 (-5)	284	-4	18th
Justin Raphael Quiban	Individual	71 (-1)	74 (+2)	75 (+3)	76 (+4)	296	+8	37th
Raymart Tolentino	Individual	75 (+3)	79 (+7)	73 (+1)	72 (E)	299	+11	42nd
Kristoffer Arevalo	Individual	79 (+7)	73 (+1)	74 (+2)	75 (+3)	301	+11	45th
Justin Raphael Quiban; Kristoffer Arevalo; Ruperto Zaragoza III; Raymart Tolentino	Team	71; ~~79~~; 72; 75	74; 73; 74; ~~79~~	~~75~~; 74; 71; 73	~~76~~; 75; 67; 72	871	+7	9th

Women

Athlete	Event	Round 1	Round 2	Round 3	Round 4	Total	Par	Rank
Clare Amelia Legaspi	Individual	70 (-2)	72 (E)	71 (-1)	74 (+2)	287	-1	13th
Princess Mary Superal	Individual	69 (-3)	73 (+1)	72 (E)	70 (-2)	284	-4	11th
Pauline Beatriz del Rosario	Individual	78 (+6)	73 (+1)	75 (+3)	75 (+3)	301	+13	22nd
Princess Mary Superal; Pauline Beatriz del Rosario; Clare Amelia Legaspi	Team	69; ~~78~~; 70	73; ~~73~~; 72	72; ~~75~~; 71	70; ~~75~~; 74	571	-5	5th

== Gymnastics ==
=== Men ===
Individual

Athlete	Event	Qualification								Final							
Athlete	Event	Apparatus						Total	Rank	Apparatus						Total	Rank
Athlete	Event	F	PH	R	V	PB	HB	Total	Rank	F	PH	R	V	PB	HB	Total	Rank
Reyland Capellan	All-around	14.400	-	-	13.975	-	-	-	-	Did not advance							
Reyland Capellan	Floor Exercise	14.400	—N/a					14.400	18	Did not advance							
Reyland Capellan	Pommel Horse	—N/a	-	—N/a				-	-	Did not advance							
Reyland Capellan	Rings	—N/a		-	—N/a			-	-	Did not advance							
Reyland Capellan	Vault	—N/a			13.975	—N/a		13.975	18	Did not advance							
Reyland Capellan	Parallel Bars	—N/a				-	—N/a	-	-	Did not advance							
Reyland Capellan	Horizontal Bars	—N/a					-	-	-	Did not advance							

== Judo ==
=== Men ===
Athlete	Event	Round of 16	Quarterfinals	Final of table	Final
Athlete	Event	Opposition Result	Opposition Result	Opposition Result	Opposition Result
Gilbert Ramirez	-73 kg	Dastan Ykybyev (KAZ); L 000-110	Did not advance		

=== Women ===
Athlete	Event	Round of 16	Quarterfinals	Final of table	Finals
Athlete	Event	Opposition Result	Opposition Result	Opposition Result	Opposition Result
Kiyomi Watanabe	-63 kg	Gulnar Hayytbayeva (TKM); W 100-000	Kana Abe (JPN); L 000-002	Final of repechage match: Marian Urdabayeva (KAZ); L 000-100	Did not advance

== Karate ==
=== Men ===
Athlete	Event	1/8 Finals	Quarterfinals	Semifinals	Finals
Athlete	Event	Opposition Result	Opposition Result	Opposition Result	Opposition Result
Orencio James Virgil de los Santos	Individual kata	Cheng Tsz Man Chris (HKG); L 1-4	Did not advance		
Ramon Antonino Franco	Kumite -55kg	Muhammad Kashif (PAK); W 9-1	Sun Jingchao (CHN); L 0-2	Did not advance	

=== Women ===
Athlete	Event	1/8 Finals	Quarterfinals	Semifinals	Finals
Athlete	Event	Opposition Result	Opposition Result	Opposition Result	Opposition Result
Gay Mabel Arevalo	Kumite -50kg	Sru Nita Sari Sukatendel (INA); L 0-8	Did not advance		
Mae Soriano	Kumite -55kg	Ma Man Sum (HKG); W 4-2	Wong Sok I (MAC); W 11-3	Sabina Zhakarova (KAZ); L 1-6	Bronze medal Contest; Cok Istri Agung Sanistuarani (INA); W 11-3 (bronze)
Princess Diane Sicangco	Kumite -61kg	Syakilla Salni Binti Jefry Krisnan (MAS); L 1-3	Repecharge Contest; Han Bui Thi Ngoc (VIE); L 1-6	Did not advance	
Joanna Mae Ylanan	Kumite -68kg	Chao Jou (TPE); L 1-1 (2-3)	Did not advance		

== Rowing ==
Men

Athlete	Event	Heats		Repechage		Finals B		Finals A	
Athlete	Event	Time	Rank	Time	Rank	Time	Rank	Time	Rank
Benjamin Tolentino	Lightweight Men's Single Sculls	7:37.05	4	7:25.87	4	7:35.98	1	Did not advance	
Edgar Ilas (b); Nestor Cordova (s)	Lightweight Men's Double Sculls	6:54.52	3	6:40.95	1	Qualified for Finals A		7:36.03	6
Roque Abala Jr. (b); Alvin Amposta (s)	Men's Double Sculls	6:53.66	5	6:53.57	3	Did not advance			

== Sailing ==
Team	Event	Race												Total	Rank
Team	Event	1	2	3	4	5	6	7	8	9	10	11	12	Total	Rank
Ridgely Balladares; Whok Dimapilis	Men's 470	5	5	6	6	4	6	6	6	5	4	4	6		6
Geylord Coveta	Mistral Men's Windsurfer	5	7	6	6	6	7	3	5	4	3	5	6		6
John Harold Madrigal	RS:X Men's Windsurfer	4	8	7	9	7	8	8	8	7	7	6	6		6

== Softball ==
=== Women ===
Team

1.Veronica Belleza
4.Annalie Benjamen
6.Marlyn Francisco
8.Angelie Ursabia
9.Francesca Altomonte
10.Garnet Agnes Blando
11.Francesca Rose Foti
12.Lorna Adorable
14.Leia Ruiz
17.Luzviminda Embudo
30.Danielle Lindsey Gilmore
31.Gabrielle Elise Rodas
33.Morgan Teressa Janai Stuart
38.Rizza Bernardino
88.Elma Parohinog

All times are Korea Standard Time (UTC+09:00)

=== Preliminaries ===
Team	Pld	W	L	RF	RA	Pct
Japan	5	5	0	39	3	1.000
Chinese Taipei	5	4	1	21	11	0.800
China	5	3	2	19	10	0.600
Philippines	5	2	3	24	24	0.400
South Korea	5	1	4	8	18	0.200
Thailand	5	0	5	2	47	0.000

27 September; 11:30	South Korea	1–3	Philippines	Songdo LNG Baseball Stadium, Incheon

Team	1	2	3	4	5	6	7	R	H	E
South Korea	0	0	0	0	1	6	0	1	6	1
Philippines	2	0	0	0	1	0	X	3	9	0

27 September; 16:30	Japan	10–2 (F/5)	Philippines	Songdo LNG Baseball Stadium, Incheon

Team	1	2	3	4	5	R	H	E
Japan	6	0	0	4	0	10	11	0
Philippines	0	0	2	0	0	2	3	3

28 September; 11:30	China	8–2	Philippines	Songdo LNG Baseball Stadium, Incheon

Team	1	2	3	4	5	6	7	R	H	E
China	0	0	0	0	0	0	0	0	0	0
Philippines	0	0	0	0	0	0	0	0	0	0

29 September; 9:00	Chinese Taipei	5–4	Philippines	Songdo LNG Baseball Stadium, Incheon

Team	1	2	3	4	5	6	7	R	H	E
Chinese Taipei	0	0	0	0	0	0	0	0	0	0
Philippines	0	0	0	0	0	0	0	0	0	0

30 September; 14:00	Philippines	13–0 (F/4)	Thailand	Songdo LNG Baseball Stadium, Incheon

Team	1	2	3	4	R	H	E
Philippines	0	0	0	0	0	2	1
Thailand	0	7	6	X	13	15	0

=== Semifinals ===
1 October; 14:30	Philippines	0–3	China	Songdo LNG Baseball Stadium, Incheon

Team	1	2	3	4	5	6	7	R	H	E
Philippines	0	0	0	0	0	0	0	0	3	2
China	0	2	0	0	0	1	0	3	5	1

== Soft Tennis ==
Athlete	Event	Round Group					1st Round	Quarterfinals	Semifinals	Final
Athlete	Event	Match 1	Match 2	Match 3	Match 4	Match 5	1st Round	Quarterfinals	Semifinals	Final
Athlete	Event	Opposition Result	Opposition Result	Opposition Result	Opposition Result	Opposition Result	Opposition Result	Opposition Result	Opposition Result	Opposition Result
Jhomar Arcilla	Men´s Singles	Zhang Yusheng (CHN); L 1-4 (1-4, 4-2, 2-4, 7-9, 1-4)	Edi Kusdaryanto (INA); L 2-4 (4-0, 4-2, 1-4, 1-4, 2-4, 3-5)	Enkhjin Bolortuya (MGL); L 2-4 (4-0, 1-4, 1-4, 1-4, 4-2, 2-4)	Sorrachet Uayporn (THA); L 2-4 (4-2, 4-2, 2-4, 5-7, 3-5, 5-7)	Kamal Bahadur Bhandari (NEP); W 4-0 (4-0, 4-1, 4-2, 4-2)	Did not advance			
Joseph Arcilla	Men´s Singles	Zhou Mo (CHN); L 0-4 (1-4, 5-7, 2-4, 2-4)	Hendri Susilo Pramono (INA); W 4-2 (2-4, 4-2, 1-4, 4-2, 4-1, 4-1)	Telmen Enkhbaatar (MGL); W 4-3 ( 6-4, 4-2, 3-5, 0-4, 0-4, 6-4, 7-1)	Thanh Hoang Tran (VIE); W 4-1 ( 4-1, 4-0, 2-4, 4-2, 4-2)	Khampaseuth Bounsaath (LAO) 'W 4-1 ( 5-3, 5-3, 3-5, 4-0, 4-2)	Edi Kusdaryanto (INA); L 1-4 ( 2-4, 2-4, 3-5, 6-3, 3-5)	Did not advance		
Noelle Conchita Zoleta	Women´s Singles	Phonesamai Champamanivong (LAO); W 4-0 ( 4-2, 4-2, 4-1, 4-0)	Chen Hui (CHN); L 0-4; W 4-0 ( 2-4, 1-4, 1-4, 1-4)	Anudari Munguntsetseg (MGL); W 4-2 ( 4-1, 2-4, 4-0, 1-4, 6-4, 5-3)	Eliza Ranjit (NEP); W 4-0 ( 4-0, 4-0, 4-1, 6-4)		Zhong Yi (CHN); L 2-4 ( 1-4, 4-2, 4-1, 3-5, 2-4, 1-4)	Did not advance		
Jhomar Arcilla; Noelle Conchita Zoleta	Mixed Doubles	Sombath Orn (CAM) and Sophany Yi (CAM); W 5-0; Opposition Disqualified	Chittakone (LAO) and Phonesamai Champamanivong (LAO); W 5-0 ( 4-0, 4-2, 4-2, 7-5, 7-5)	Eliza Ranjit (NEP) and Kamal Bahadur Bhandari (NEP); W 5-0 ( 4-1, 4-1, 4-1, 4-1, 4-1)	Bayasgalant Uchirsaikhan (MGL) and Norovsuren Bulgan (MGL); L 2-5 ( 7-5, 2-4, 0-4, 5-3, 2-4, 3-5, 0-4)		Zhou Mo (CHN) and Chen Hui (CHN); L 2-5 ( 0-4, 4-6, 1-4, 4-2, 4-2, 4-6, 2-4)	Did not advance		
Joseph Arcilla; Jhomar Arcilla	Men's Doubles	Quang Tri Lam (VIE) and Khuong Huynh Chi (VIE); L 1-5 ( 3-5, 4-6, 3-5, 2-4, 4-1, 0-4, )	Bayasgalant Uchirsaikhan (MGL) and Enkhtuvshin Gantulga (MGL); W 5-1 ( 4-2, 5-7, 4-2, 4-2, 4-1, 4-1)	Lai Li Huang (TPE) and Ho Meng Hsun (TPE); L 0-5 ( 0-4, 1-4, 2-4, 2-4, 1-4)	Takuya Katsura (JPN) and Keiya Nakamoto (JPN); L 3-5 ( 4-6, 3-5, 4-6, 5-3, 4-1, 0-4, 5-3, 0-4)		Did not advance			

== Shooting ==
Men

Athlete	Event	Qualification		Final	
Athlete	Event	Score	Rank	Score	Rank
Eric Ang	Trap	108	37	Did not advance	
Hagen Alexander Topacio	Trap	112	28	Did not advance	

== Swimming ==
Men

Athlete	Event	Heats		Final	
Athlete	Event	Time	Rank	Time	Rank
Jessie Khing Lacuna	200 m freestyle	1:53.20	15th	Did not advance	
Jessie Khing Lacuna	100 m freestyle	51.89	17th	Did not advance	
Jessie Khing Lacuna	100 m butterfly	55.18	13th	Did not advance	
Joshua Hall	50 m breaststroke	28.67	9th	Did not advance	
Joshua Hall	100 m breaststroke	1:03.26	12th	Did not advance	

Women

Athlete	Event	Heats		Final	
Athlete	Event	Time	Rank	Time	Rank
Jasmine Alkhaldi	50 m freestyle	26.35	10th	Did not advance	
Jasmine Alkhaldi	100 m freestyle	56.92	9th	Did not advance	
Jasmine Alkhaldi	200 m freestyle	2:02.84	9th	Did not advance	
Jasmine Alkhaldi	100 m butterfly	1:02.34	9th	Did not advance	

== Taekwondo ==
=== Men ===
Athlete	Event	Round of 32	Round of 16	Quarterfinals	Semifinals	Final
Athlete	Event	Opposition Result	Opposition Result	Opposition Result	Opposition Result	Opposition Result
Samuel Thomas Harper Morrison	Lightweight (-74kg)	Wong Soi Chun (MAC); W PTS 17-0; Walkover	Yerzhan Abylkas (KAZ); W PTS 10-9	Akbar Aitakhunov (KGZ); W PTS 16-6	Masoud Hajizavareh (IRI); L RSC 1-5; Bronze	Did not advance
Kristopher Robert Uy	Middleweight (-87kg)		Hao Chao (MAC); W PTS 9-2	Cheng Linglong (CHN); L PTS 3-5	Did not advance	
Christian Al Dela Cruz	Welterweight (-80kg)		Mahmoud Hamdy M Abdelrahim (QAT); W PTS 8-2	Maksim Rafalovich (UZB); L PTS 9-10	Did not advance	
Benjamin Keith Sembrano	Featherweight (-68kg)		Gh M Hasan Abdullah (KUW); W PTS 12-10	Chetrapee Tangjai (THA); W PTS 12-9	Jiannan Huang (CHN); L PTS 3-16; Bronze	Did not advance
Japoy Lizardo	Finweight (-46kg)	Thipphakone Kuangmany (LAO); W PTS 10-3	Ghazanfar Ali (PAK); L PTS 12-14	Did not advance		
Francis Aaron Agojo	Flyweight (-58kg)		Shein Naing Dwe (MYA); W PTG 14-1	Yuma Yamada (JPN); L PTS 16-18	Did not advance	

=== Women ===
Athlete	Event	Round of 32	Round of 16	Quarterfinals	Semifinals	Final
Athlete	Event	Opposition Result	Opposition Result	Opposition Result	Opposition Result	Opposition Result
Levita Ronna Ilao	Flyweight (-49kg)		Thi Huong Giang Doan (VIE); W PTS 3-1	Luisa dos Santos Rosa (TLS); W PTS 6-2	Li Zhaoyi (CHN); L 1-5; Bronze	Did not advance
Nicole Abigail Cham	Bantamweight (-53kg)		Sarita Phongsri (THA); L PTS 0-12	Did not advance		
Pauline Louise Lopez	Featherweight (-57kg)		Yun Wang (CHN); L PTS 0-3	Did not advance		
Mary Anjelay Pelaez	Finweight (-46kg)			Nway Nway (MYA); W PTS 3-0	Kim Sohui (KOR); L PTS 2-14; Bronze	Did not advance
Jane Rafaelle Narra	Welterweight (-67kg)			Yunfei Guo (CHN); L PTS 0-5	Did not advance	
Kirstie Elaine Alora	Middleweight (-73kg)			Rima Abdel Karim Ibrahim Ananbeh (JOR); W PTS 3-2	Seavmey Sorn (CAM); L PTS 5-6; Bronze	Did not advance

== Tennis ==
Athlete	Event	Round of 64	Round of 32	Round of 16	Quarterfinals	Semifinals	Final
Athlete	Event	Opposition Result	Opposition Result	Opposition Result	Opposition Result	Opposition Result	Opposition Result
Ruben Gonzales Jr. Treat Conrad Huey; Patrick John Tierro	Men's Team	Mongolia (MGL); W 3-0	Chinese Taipei (TPE); L 1-2	Did not advance			
Denise Dy; Katharina Melissa Lehnert	Women's Team	South Korea (KOR); L 0-3	Did not advance				
Patrick John Tierro	Men's singles	Ho Tin Marco Leung (MAC); W 2-0	Chung Hyeon (KOR); L 0-2	Did not advance			
Denise Dy	Women's singles		Misa Eguchi (JPN); L 0-2	Did not advance			
Katharina Melissa Lehnert	Women's singles		Eri Hozumi (JPN); L 0-2	Did not advance			
Ruben Gonzales Jr. Katharina Melissa Lehnert	Mixed doubles	BYE	Anne Mathema (NEP) and Dawa Sonam Sherpa (NEP); W 2-0	Sanchai Ratiwatana (THA) and Peangtarn Pilipuech (THA); L 1-2	Did not advance		
Treat Conrad Huey; Denise Dy	Mixed doubles	BYE	Wong Chun Hun (HKG) and Katherine Cheng Ip (HKG); W 2-0	Danai Udomchoke (THA) and Tamarine Tanasugarin (THA); L 0-2	Did not advance		
Ruben Gonzales Jr. Treat Conrad Huey	Men's doubles		BYE	Chan Chi Neng (MAC) and Ho Tin Marco Leung (MAC); W 2-0	Lim Yongkyu (KOR) and Chung Hyeon (KOR); L 0-2	Did not advance	

== Triathlon ==
Athlete	Event	Swim (1.5 km)		Trans 1			Bike (40 km)			Trans 2			Run (10 km)		Total	Rank
Athlete	Event	Time	Swim Rank	Time	Transfer Rank	Overall Rank	Time	Bike Rank	Overall Rank	Time	Transfer Rank	Overall Rank	Time	Run Rank	Total	Rank
Nikko Bryan Huelgas	Men's Individual	21:08	14	0:35; 21:43	=21	17	1:00:31; 1:22:13	9	11	0:34; 1:22:46	18	14	36:31	10	1:59:17	11th
Jonard Saim	Men's Individual	21:13	18	0:29; 21:42	=9	16	1:00:31; 1:22:13	9	12	0:22; 1:22:35	=2	11	36:25	9	1:59:00	10th
Marion Kim Mangrobang	Women's Individual	20:21	9	0:30; 20:51	=3	9	1:09:15; 1:30:06	9	9	0:24; 1:30:30	=3	8	42:48	9	2:13:18	9th
Ma Claire Adorna	Women's Individual	20:09	6	0:34; 20:43	=10	6	1:05:57; 1:26:40	2	7	0:26; 1:27:06	=5	6	41:59	8	2:09:05	7th

== Weightlifting ==
Athlete	Event	Snatch			Clean & jerk			Total	Rank
Athlete	Event	Attempt 1	Attempt 2	Attempt 3	Attempt 1	Attempt 2	Attempt 3	Total	Rank
Nestor Colonia	Men's 56 kg	~~120~~	~~120~~	~~120~~	Did not finish				

== Wrestling ==
Greco-Roman

Athlete	Event	Round of 16	Quarterfinals	Semifinals	Final
Athlete	Event	Opposition Result	Opposition Result	Opposition Result	Opposition Result
Margarito Angana Jr.	59 kg	Ahmadjon Mahmudov (KAZ); L VT 0-5	Did not advance		
Jason Balabal	85 kg	Ibrahim S M Hanini (PLE); W ST 4-0	Azat Beishebekov (KGZ); L SP 2-11	Did not advance	

== Wushu ==
=== Men ===
Sanda

Athlete	Event	Round of 16	Quarterfinals	Semifinals	Final	Rank
Athlete	Event	Opposition Result	Opposition Result	Opposition Result	Opposition Result	Rank
Francisco Solis	-56 kg	Shams (PAK); W 2-0	Wong (HKG); W 2-0	Zhao (CHN); L 0-0; Default due to Injury	Did not advance	Bronze
Jean Claude Saclag	-60 kg	Li (MYA); W 2-0	Tarigan (INA); W 2-0	Grewal (IND); W 2-0	Kong (CHN); L 0-2	Silver
Clemente Tabugara Jr.	-65 kg	Mohammadseifi (IRI); L 0-1	Did not advance			

Taijiquan\Taijijian

Athlete	Event	Taijijian		Taijiquan		Total	
Athlete	Event	Result	Rank	Result	Rank	Result	Rank
Daniel Parantac	Taijiquan\Taijijian All-Round	9.58	8	9.68	2	19.26	Silver

=== Women ===
Sanda

Athlete	Event	Round of 16	Quarterfinals	Semifinals	Final
Athlete	Event	Opposition Result	Opposition Result	Opposition Result	Opposition Result
Divine Wally	-52 kg	Chao Yo Hee (HKG); W 2-0	Kim Hyebin (KOR); L 0-2	Did not advance	
