= Ganghwa Dolmens Gymnasium =

Sports venue in Incheon, South Korea

Ganghwa Dolmens Gymnasium 강화고인돌체육관
- Location: Ganghwa County, Incheon, South Korea
- Operator: Ganghwa County
- Capacity: 4,043 (1,428 adjustable)

Construction
- Opened: October 2013

Ganghwa Dolmens Gymnasium is an indoor arena in Incheon, South Korea. It has hosted numerous international tournaments such as the taekwondo and wushu events of the 2014 Asian Games.
