= Mongolia at the 2014 Asian Games =

- IOC code: MGL
- NOC: Mongolian National Olympic Committee

in Incheon
- Competitors: 234 in 24 sports
- Medals Ranked 16th: Gold 5 Silver 4 Bronze 12 Total 21

Asian Games appearances (overview)
- 1974; 1978; 1982; 1986; 1990; 1994; 1998; 2002; 2006; 2010; 2014; 2018; 2022; 2026

Mongolia participated in the 2014 Asian Games in Incheon, South Korea from 19 September to 4 October 2014.

== Medal summary ==
=== Medals by sport ===
Sport	Gold	Silver	Bronze	Total
Judo	3	3	4	10
Shooting	1	0	2	3
Wrestling	0	1	4	5
Boxing	1	0	1	2
Taekwondo	0	0	1	1
Total	5	4	12	21

=== Medalists ===
Medal	Athlete	Sport	Event	Date
Gold	Davaadorjiin Tömörkhüleg	Judo	Men's 66 kg	20 September
Gold	Mönkhbatyn Urantsetseg	Judo	Women's 48 kg	20 September
Gold	Naidangiin Tüvshinbayar	Judo	Men's 100 kg	22 September
Gold	Chuluunbadrakhyn Narantuyaa	Shooting	Women's 50 metre rifle prone	September
Gold	Dorjnyambuugiin Otgondalai	Boxing	Men's 60 kg	3 October
Silver	Ganbatyn Boldbaatar	Judo	Men's 60 kg	20 September
Silver	Ganbaataryn Odbayar	Judo	Men's 73 kg	21 September
Silver	Ölziibayaryn Duurenbayar	Judo	Men's + 100 kg	22 September
Silver	Sündeviin Byambatseren	Wrestling	Women's freestyle 55 kg	28 September
Bronze	Nyamsürengiin Dagvasüren	Judo	Men's 81 kg	21 September
Bronze	Lkhavgasurengiin Otgonbaatar	Judo	Men's 90 kg	September
Bronze	Dorjsürengiin Sumiyaa	Judo	Women's 57 kg	September
Bronze	Tsend-Ayuushiin Naranjargal	Judo	Women's 70 kg	September
Bronze	Otryadyn Gündegmaa	Shooting	Women's 25 metre pistol	September
Bronze	Otryadyn Gündegmaa; Tsogbadrakhyn Mönkhzul; Tömörchuduriin Bayartsetseg	Shooting	Women's 10 metre air pistol team	September
Bronze	Batboldyn Nomin	Wrestling	Men's freestyle 57 kg	27 September
Bronze	Dorjkhandyn Khüderbulga	Wrestling	Men's freestyle 97 kg	28 September
Bronze	Sükheegiin Tserenchimed	Wrestling	Women's freestyle 63 kg	27 September
Bronze	Ochirbatyn Burmaa	Wrestling	Women's freestyle 75 kg	28 September
Bronze	Myagmardulamyn Nandintsetseg	Boxing	Women's 51 kg	September
Bronze	Molomyn Tümenbayar	Taekwondo	Men's 54 kg	3 October
