= Cambodia at the 2014 Asian Games =

- IOC code: CAM
- NOC: National Olympic Committee of Cambodia
- Website: www.noccambodia.org (in Khmer and English)

in Incheon
- Medals Ranked 28th: Gold 1 Silver 0 Bronze 0 Total 1

Asian Games appearances (overview)
- 1954; 1958; 1962; 1966; 1970; 1974; 1978–1990; 1994; 1998; 2002; 2006; 2010; 2014; 2018; 2022; 2026

Cambodia participated in the 2014 Asian Games in Incheon, South Korea from 19 September to 4 October 2014. The country won its first-ever Asian Games gold medal courtesy of Sorn Seavmey in women's taekwondo middleweight class. Seavmey also was her country's only medalist in the competition.

== Medal summary ==
Cambodia won its first-ever Asian Games gold medal after 44 years of competing at the games. Taekwondo practitioner Sorn Seavmey, then aged 19, won the title competing in Taekwondo for Women's under 73 kg.

Medal	Name	Sport	Event	Date
Gold	Sorn Seavmey	Taekwondo	Women's Middleweight(−73kg)	3 October

== Athletics (track and field) ==
Key

- Note – Ranks given for track events are within the athlete's heat only
- Q = Qualified for the next round
- q = Qualified for the next round as a fastest loser or, in field events, by position without achieving the qualifying target
- NR = National record
- N/A = Round not applicable for the event
- Bye = Athlete not required to compete in round

Men
Track & road events

Athlete	Event	Heat		Semifinal		Final	
Athlete	Event	Result	Rank	Result	Rank	Result	Rank
Ma Viro	5000 m	—N/a				16:00.31	19
Kuniaki Takizaki	Marathon	—N/a				2:34:16	14
Hem Bunting	Marathon	—N/a				DNF	
