= Swimming at the 2014 Asian Games =

- Venue: Munhak Park Tae-hwan Aquatics Center
- Dates: 21–26 September 2014
- Competitors: 322 from 34 nations

Swimming events at the 2014 Asian Games was held at the Munhak Park Tae-hwan Aquatics Center in Incheon, South Korea from September 21 to 26, 2014. There were 38 long-course events: 19 for men and 19 for women.

== Schedule ==
H	Heats	F	Final

Event↓/Date →	21st Sun		22nd Mon		23rd Tue		24th Wed		25th Thu		26th Fri	
Men's 50 m freestyle					H	F						
Men's 100 m freestyle									H	F		
Men's 200 m freestyle	H	F										
Men's 400 m freestyle					H	F						
Men's 1500 m freestyle											F	
Men's 50 m backstroke			H	F								
Men's 100 m backstroke	H	F										
Men's 200 m backstroke									H	F		
Men's 50 m breaststroke											H	F
Men's 100 m breaststroke							H	F				
Men's 200 m breaststroke					H	F						
Men's 50 m butterfly									H	F		
Men's 100 m butterfly							H	F				
Men's 200 m butterfly	H	F										
Men's 200 m individual medley			H	F								
Men's 400 m individual medley							H	F				
Men's 4 × 100 m freestyle relay							H	F				
Men's 4 × 200 m freestyle relay			H	F								
Men's 4 × 100 m medley relay											H	F
Women's 50 m freestyle											H	F
Women's 100 m freestyle			H	F								
Women's 200 m freestyle							H	F				
Women's 400 m freestyle	H	F										
Women's 800 m freestyle									F			
Women's 50 m backstroke					H	F						
Women's 100 m backstroke							H	F				
Women's 200 m backstroke											H	F
Women's 50 m breaststroke									H	F		
Women's 100 m breaststroke	H	F										
Women's 200 m breaststroke			H	F								
Women's 50 m butterfly			H	F								
Women's 100 m butterfly					H	F						
Women's 200 m butterfly							H	F				
Women's 200 m individual medley											H	F
Women's 400 m individual medley					H	F						
Women's 4 × 100 m freestyle relay	H	F										
Women's 4 × 200 m freestyle relay					F							
Women's 4 × 100 m medley relay									H	F		

== Medalists ==
=== Men ===
Event	Gold		Silver		Bronze	
50 m freestyle	Ning Zetao; China	21.95	Shinri Shioura; Japan	22.11	Kenta Ito; Japan	22.16
100 m freestyle	Ning Zetao; China	47.70; AR	Shinri Shioura; Japan	48.85	Rammaru Harada; Japan	49.47
200 m freestyle	Kosuke Hagino; Japan	1:45.23	Sun Yang; China	1:45.28	Li Yunqi; China	1:49.25
400 m freestyle	Sun Yang; China	3:43.23	Kosuke Hagino; Japan	3:44.48	Hao Yun; China	3:50.38
1500 m freestyle	Sun Yang; China	14:49.75	Kohei Yamamoto; Japan	14:54.86	Wang Kecheng; China	15:06.73
50 m backstroke	Junya Koga; Japan	24.28; GR	Ryosuke Irie; Japan	24.98	Xu Jiayu; China	25.24
100 m backstroke	Ryosuke Irie; Japan	52.34; GR	Xu Jiayu; China	52.81	Kosuke Hagino; Japan	53.71
200 m backstroke	Ryosuke Irie; Japan	1:53.26; GR	Xu Jiayu; China	1:55.05	Kosuke Hagino; Japan	1:56.36
50 m breaststroke	Dmitriy Balandin; Kazakhstan	27.78; GR	Yasuhiro Koseki; Japan	27.89	Sandeep Sejwal; India	28.26
100 m breaststroke	Dmitriy Balandin; Kazakhstan	59.92; GR	Yasuhiro Koseki; Japan	1:00.23	Li Xiang; China	1:00.91
200 m breaststroke	Dmitriy Balandin; Kazakhstan	2:07.67; GR	Kazuki Kohinata; Japan	2:09.45	Yasuhiro Koseki; Japan	2:09.48
50 m butterfly	Shi Yang; China	23.46; GR	Joseph Schooling; Singapore	23.70	Yang Jung-doo; South Korea	23.79
100 m butterfly	Joseph Schooling; Singapore	51.76; GR	Li Zhuhao; China	51.91	Hirofumi Ikebata; Japan	52.08
200 m butterfly	Daiya Seto; Japan	1:54.08	Kenta Hirai; Japan	1:55.47	Joseph Schooling; Singapore	1:57.54
200 m individual medley	Kosuke Hagino; Japan	1:55.34; GR	Hiromasa Fujimori; Japan	1:58.56	Wang Shun; China	1:59.10
400 m individual medley	Kosuke Hagino; Japan	4:07.75; GR	Yang Zhixian; China	4:10.18	Daiya Seto; Japan	4:10.39
4 × 100 m freestyle relay	China; Yu Hexin; Lin Yongqing; Sun Yang; Ning Zetao; Hao Yun; Xu Qiheng; Liu Junwu	3:13.47; AR	Japan; Shinri Shioura; Rammaru Harada; Takuro Fujii; Katsumi Nakamura; Kenta Ito	3:14.38	Hong Kong; Geoffrey Cheah; Jeremy Wong; Derick Ng; Kent Cheung; Raymond Mak; David Wong	3:22.45
4 × 200 m freestyle relay	Japan; Yuki Kobori; Kosuke Hagino; Daiya Seto; Takeshi Matsuda	7:06.74; GR	China; Li Yunqi; Lin Yongqing; Mao Feilian; Xu Qiheng	7:16.51	Singapore; Danny Yeo; Pang Sheng Jun; Teo Zhen Ren; Clement Lim	7:25.46
4 × 100 m medley relay	China; Xu Jiayu; Li Xiang; Li Zhuhao; Ning Zetao; Jin Yan; Mao Feilian; Wang Yuxin; Yu Hexin	3:31.37; GR	Japan; Ryosuke Irie; Yasuhiro Koseki; Hirofumi Ikebata; Shinri Shioura	3:31.70	Uzbekistan; Daniil Bukin; Vladislav Mustafin; Islam Aslanov; Khurshidjon Tursunov; Dmitriy Shvetsov; Aleksey Derlyugov; Daniil Tulupov	3:43.54

=== Women ===
Event	Gold		Silver		Bronze	
50 m freestyle	Chen Xinyi; China	24.87; GR	Miki Uchida; Japan	25.11	Tang Yi; China	25.17
100 m freestyle	Shen Duo; China	54.37	Tang Yi; China	54.45	Miki Uchida; Japan	54.66
200 m freestyle	Shen Duo; China	1:57.66	Chihiro Igarashi; Japan	1:59.13	Tang Yi; China	1:59.34
400 m freestyle	Zhang Yuhan; China	4:07.67	Bi Yirong; China	4:08.23	Chihiro Igarashi; Japan	4:09.35
800 m freestyle	Bi Yirong; China	8:27.54	Xu Danlu; China	8:33.89	Asami Chida; Japan	8:34.66
50 m backstroke	Fu Yuanhui; China	27.66	Yekaterina Rudenko; Kazakhstan	28.04	Miyuki Takemura; Japan	28.27
100 m backstroke	Fu Yuanhui; China	59.95	Yekaterina Rudenko; Kazakhstan	1:00.61	Wang Xueer; China	1:01.09
200 m backstroke	Sayaka Akase; Japan	2:10.31	Chen Jie; China	2:10.53	Nguyễn Thị Ánh Viên; Vietnam	2:12.25
50 m breaststroke	Satomi Suzuki; Japan	31.34	Suo Ran; China	31.52	He Yuzhe; China	31.62
100 m breaststroke	Shi Jinglin; China	1:06.67; GR	Kanako Watanabe; Japan	1:06.80	He Yun; China	1:08.11
200 m breaststroke	Kanako Watanabe; Japan	2:21.82; GR	Rie Kaneto; Japan	2:21.92	Shi Jinglin; China	2:23.58
50 m butterfly	Lu Ying; China	25.83; GR	Tao Li; Singapore	26.28	Liu Lan; China	26.72
100 m butterfly	Chen Xinyi; China	56.61; GR	Lu Ying; China	58.45	Tao Li; Singapore	59.08
200 m butterfly	Jiao Liuyang; China	2:07.56	Natsumi Hoshi; Japan	2:08.04	Miyu Nakano; Japan	2:09.18
200 m individual medley	Ye Shiwen; China	2:08.94; GR	Kanako Watanabe; Japan	2:10.58	Miho Teramura; Japan	2:11.24
400 m individual medley	Ye Shiwen; China	4:32.97; GR	Sakiko Shimizu; Japan	4:38.63	Nguyễn Thị Ánh Viên; Vietnam	4:39.65
4 × 100 m freestyle relay	China; Ye Shiwen; Shen Duo; Zhang Yufei; Tang Yi; Qiu Yuhan; Chen Xinyi; Sun Meichen; Zhou Yilin	3:37.25	Japan; Miki Uchida; Misaki Yamaguchi; Kanako Watanabe; Yayoi Matsumoto; Yasuko Miyamoto	3:39.35	Hong Kong; Camille Cheng; Stephanie Au; Sze Hang Yu; Siobhán Haughey	3:39.94
4 × 200 m freestyle relay	China; Guo Junjun; Tang Yi; Cao Yue; Shen Duo	7:55.17	Japan; Chihiro Igarashi; Yasuko Miyamoto; Yayoi Matsumoto; Aya Takano	7:58.43	Hong Kong; Camille Cheng; Stephanie Au; Sze Hang Yu; Siobhán Haughey	8:04.55
4 × 100 m medley relay	Japan; Shiho Sakai; Kanako Watanabe; Natsumi Hoshi; Miki Uchida; Miyu Nakano	4:00.94	South Korea; Lee Da-lin; Yang Ji-won; An Se-hyeon; Ko Mi-so	4:04.82	Hong Kong; Stephanie Au; Yvette Kong; Sze Hang Yu; Siobhán Haughey; Claudia Lau; Jamie Yeung; Chan Kin Lok; Tam Hoi Lam	4:07.15

== Medal table ==
Rank	Nation	Gold	Silver	Bronze	Total
1	China (CHN)	22	12	13	47
2	Japan (JPN)	12	21	13	46
3	Kazakhstan (KAZ)	3	2	0	5
4	Singapore (SIN)	1	2	3	6
5	South Korea (KOR)	0	1	1	2
6	Hong Kong (HKG)	0	0	4	4
7	Vietnam (VIE)	0	0	2	2
8	India (IND)	0	0	1	1
8	Uzbekistan (UZB)	0	0	1	1
Totals (9 entries)		38	38	38	114

== Participating nations ==
A total of 322 athletes from 34 nations competed in swimming at the 2014 Asian Games:

- Cambodia (2)
- China (54)
- Chinese Taipei (24)
- Hong Kong (24)
- India (7)
- Indonesia (6)
- Iran (5)
- Japan (38)
- Kazakhstan (5)
- Kuwait (5)
- Kyrgyzstan (1)
- Laos (2)
- Lebanon (2)
- Macau (10)
- Malaysia (6)
- Maldives (8)
- Mongolia (9)
- Nepal (4)
- Oman (1)
- Pakistan (8)
- Palestine (3)
- Philippines (3)
- Qatar (1)
- Saudi Arabia (3)
- Singapore (17)
- South Korea (35)
- Syria (2)
- Tajikistan (5)
- Thailand (9)
- Turkmenistan (4)
- United Arab Emirates (3)
- Uzbekistan (10)
- Vietnam (4)
- Yemen (2)
