= China at the 2015 World Aquatics Championships =

- Flag of China
- World Aquatics code: CHN
- National federation: Chinese Swimming Association
- Website: swimmingsport.org.cn

in Kazan, Russia
- Competitors: 90 in 5 sports
- Medals Ranked 1st: Gold 15 Silver 10 Bronze 10 Total 35

World Aquatics Championships appearances
- 1973; 1975; 1978; 1982; 1986; 1991; 1994; 1998; 2001; 2003; 2005; 2007; 2009; 2011; 2013; 2015; 2017; 2019; 2022; 2023; 2024; 2025

The People's Republic of China competed at the 2015 World Aquatics Championships in Kazan, Russia from 24 July to 9 August 2015.

== Medalists ==
Medal	Name	Sport	Event	Date
Gold	Tai Xiaohu; Si Yajie	Diving	Mixed 10 m synchronized platform	July 25
Gold	Shi Tingmao; Wu Minxia	Diving	Women's 3 m synchronized springboard	July 25
Gold	Chen Aisen; Lin Yue	Diving	Men's 10 m synchronized platform	July 26
Gold	Xie Siyi	Diving	Men's 1 m springboard	July 27
Gold	Chen Ruolin; Liu Huixia	Diving	Women's 10 m synchronized platform	July 27
Gold	Cao Yuan; Qin Kai	Diving	Men's 3 m synchronized springboard	July 28
Gold	He Chao	Diving	Men's 3 m springboard	July 31
Gold	Shi Tingmao	Diving	Women's 3 m springboard	August 1
Gold	Wang Han; Yang Hao	Diving	Mixed 3 m synchronized springboard	August 2
Gold	Sun Yang	Swimming	Men's 400 m freestyle	August 2
Gold	Qiu Bo	Diving	Men's 10 m platform	August 2
Gold	Sun Yang	Swimming	Men's 800 m freestyle	August 5
Gold	Ning Zetao	Swimming	Men's 100 m freestyle	August 6
Gold	Fu Yuanhui	Swimming	Women's 50 m backstroke	August 6
Gold	Chen Xinyi*; Fu Yuanhui; Lu Ying; Qiu Yuhan*; Shen Duo; Shi Jinglin	Swimming	Women's 4 × 100 m medley relay	August 9
Silver	Huang Xuechen; Sun Wenyan	Synchronized swimming	Duet technical routine	July 26
Silver	Shi Tingmao	Diving	Women's 1 m springboard	July 27
Silver	Gu Xiao; Guo Li; Huang Xuechen; Li Xiaolu; Liang Xinping; Sun Wenyan; Tang Mengni; Xiao Yanning*; Yin Chengxin*; Zeng Zhen	Synchronized swimming	Team technical routine	July 27
Silver	Huang Xuechen	Synchronized swimming	Solo free routine	July 29
Silver	Huang Xuechen; Sun Wenyan	Synchronized swimming	Duet free routine	July 30
Silver	Ren Qian	Diving	Women's 10 m platform	July 30
Silver	Gu Xiao; Guo Li; Li Xiaolu; Liang Xinping; Sun Wenyan; Tang Mengni; Yin Chengxin; Zeng Zhen	Synchronized swimming	Team free routine	July 31
Silver	He Zi	Diving	Women's 3 m springboard	August 1
Silver	Gu Xiao; Guo Li; Li Xiaolu; Liang Xinping; Sun Wenyan; Tang Mengni; Xiao Yanning; Yin Chengxin; Zeng Zhen	Synchronized swimming	Free routine combination	August 1
Silver	Sun Yang	Swimming	Men's 200 m freestyle	August 4
Bronze	Sun Wenyan	Synchronized swimming	Solo technical routine	July 25
Bronze	He Zi	Diving	Women's 1 m springboard	July 27
Bronze	Xie Siyi; Chen Ruolin	Diving	Mixed team	July 29
Bronze	Lu Ying	Swimming	Women's 100 m butterfly	August 3
Bronze	Wang Shun	Swimming	Men's 200 m individual medley	August 6
Bronze	Zhang Yufei	Swimming	Women's 200 m butterfly	August 6
Bronze	Liu Xiang	Swimming	Women's 50 m backstroke	August 6
Bronze	Guo Junjun; Qiu Yuhan; Shao Yiwen*; Shen Duo; Zhang Yufei; Zhang Yuhan*	Swimming	Women's 4 × 200 m freestyle relay	August 6
Bronze	Shi Jinglin	Swimming	Women's 200 m breaststroke	August 7
Bronze	Lu Ying	Swimming	Women's 50 m butterfly	August 8

== Diving ==
Chinese divers are eligible for two spots in each individual event (1 m, 3 m, and 10 m) and one team spot for each synchronized event (3 m, 10 m, and team).

Men

Athlete	Event	Preliminaries		Semifinals		Final	
Athlete	Event	Points	Rank	Points	Rank	Points	Rank
He Chao	1 m springboard	394.95	5 Q	—N/a		415.50	7
Xie Siyi	1 m springboard	404.40	2 Q	—N/a		485.50	1st place, gold medalist(s)
Cao Yuan	3 m springboard	517.40	1 Q	540.80	1 Q	523.95	4
He Chao	3 m springboard	515.30	2 Q	527.95	2 Q	555.05	1st place, gold medalist(s)
Qiu Bo	10 m platform	513.00	3 Q	577.00	1 Q	587.00	1st place, gold medalist(s)
Yang Jian	10 m platform	501.00	4 Q	539.75	2 Q	451.20	10
Cao Yuan; Qin Kai	3 m synchronized springboard	434.43	2 Q	—N/a		471.45	1st place, gold medalist(s)
Chen Aisen; Lin Yue	10 m synchronized platform	470.13	1 Q	—N/a		495.72	1st place, gold medalist(s)

Women

Athlete	Event	Preliminaries		Semifinals		Final	
Athlete	Event	Points	Rank	Points	Rank	Points	Rank
He Zi	1 m springboard	285.40	3 Q	—N/a		300.30	3rd place, bronze medalist(s)
Shi Tingmao	1 m springboard	307.35	1 Q	—N/a		309.20	2nd place, silver medalist(s)
He Zi	3 m springboard	376.00	1 Q	371.40	2 Q	377.45	2nd place, silver medalist(s)
Shi Tingmao	3 m springboard	368.40	2 Q	381.90	1 Q	383.55	1st place, gold medalist(s)
Ren Qian	10 m platform	411.40	1 Q	423.15	1 Q	388.00	2nd place, silver medalist(s)
Si Yajie	10 m platform	377.75	2 Q	395.75	2 Q	384.40	4
Shi Tingmao; Wu Minxia	3 m synchronised springboard	312.90	1 Q	—N/a		351.30	1st place, gold medalist(s)
Chen Ruolin; Liu Huixia	10 m synchronised platform	330.24	1 Q	—N/a		359.52	1st place, gold medalist(s)

Mixed

Athlete	Event	Final	
Athlete	Event	Points	Rank
Wang Han; Yang Hao	3 m synchronized springboard	339.90	1st place, gold medalist(s)
Tai Xiaohu; Si Yajie	10 m synchronized platform	350.88	1st place, gold medalist(s)
Xie Siyi; Chen Ruolin	Team	425.40	3rd place, bronze medalist(s)

== Open water swimming ==
China has fielded a team of thirteen swimmers to compete in the open water marathon. Among the official roster featured 2012 Olympian Fang Yanqiao.

Men

Athlete	Event	Time	Rank
Lang Yuanpeng	5 km	59:42.8	37
Qiao Zhongyi	10 km	1:53:38.5	45
Yang Jintong	5 km	56:07.6	35
Ye Qianpeng	25 km	5:19:01.5	22
Zhang Zibin	25 km	Did not finish	
Zu Lijun	10 km	1:50:46.0	17

Women

Athlete	Event	Time	Rank
Cao Shiyue	25 km	6:02:49.7	17
Fang Yanqiao	5 km	1:00:51.7	20
Niu Xiaoxiao	5 km	1:03:50.4	26
Shi Yu	10 km	1:59:28.6	15
Yan Siyu	10 km	1:59:39.9	26
Yang Dandan	25 km	5:42:19.5	16

Mixed

Athlete	Event	Time	Rank
Qiao Zhongyi; Yan Siyu; Zu Lijun	Team	57:53.9	14

== Swimming ==
Chinese swimmers have achieved qualifying standards in the following events (up to a maximum of 2 swimmers in each event at the A-standard entry time, and 1 at the B-standard): Swimmers must qualify at the 2015 Chinese Swimming Championships (for pool events) to confirm their places for the Worlds.

The Chinese team consists of 51 swimmers (25 men and 26 women). Nineteen of these swimmers have competed at the previous World Championships in Barcelona including undisputed superstars and Olympic champions Sun Yang in the long-distance freestyle and Ye Shiwen in the individual medley.

Men

Athlete	Event	Heat		Semifinal		Final	
Athlete	Event	Time	Rank	Time	Rank	Time	Rank
Hao Yun	200 m butterfly	1:59.04	25	Did not advance			
Huang Chaosheng	400 m individual medley	4:19.11	19	—N/a		Did not advance	
Li Guangyuan	100 m backstroke	54.34	20	Did not advance			
Li Guangyuan	200 m backstroke	1:58.02	12 Q	1:57.12	8 Q	1:56.79	8
Li Xiang	100 m breaststroke	1:00.96	27	Did not advance			
Li Xiang	200 m breaststroke	2:11.30	17	Did not advance			
Li Yunqi	400 m freestyle	3:51.30	26	—N/a		Did not advance	
Li Zhuhao	100 m butterfly	51.54	3 Q	51.33	4 Q	51.66	8
Mao Feilian	200 m breaststroke	2:09.56	3 Q	2:09.54	7 Q	2:10.02	8
Ning Zetao	50 m freestyle	22.43	14 Q	22.18	15	Did not advance	
Ning Zetao	100 m freestyle	48.11	1 Q	48.13	2 Q	47.84	1st place, gold medalist(s)
Shi Weijia	50 m breaststroke	27.65	19	Did not advance			
Shi Yang	50 m butterfly	23.43	7 Q	23.44	=12	Did not advance	
Sun Yang	200 m freestyle	1:46.00	1 Q	1:46.17	5 Q	1:45.20	2nd place, silver medalist(s)
Sun Yang	400 m freestyle	3:44.99	1 Q	—N/a		3:42.58	1st place, gold medalist(s)
Sun Yang	800 m freestyle	7:47.87	6 Q	—N/a		7:39.96	1st place, gold medalist(s)
Sun Yang	1500 m freestyle	14:55.11	3 Q	—N/a		DNS	
Wang Kecheng	800 m freestyle	7:56.05	19	—N/a		Did not advance	
Wang Kecheng	1500 m freestyle	15:16.69	19	—N/a		Did not advance	
Wang Pudong	200 m butterfly	1:58.20	20	Did not advance			
Wang Shun	200 m individual medley	1:58.33	3 Q	1:57.07	2 Q	1:56.81	3rd place, bronze medalist(s)
Xu Jiayu	50 m backstroke	25.71	29	Did not advance			
Xu Jiayu	100 m backstroke	53.29	3 Q	53.15	7 Q	52.89	4
Xu Jiayu	200 m backstroke	1:56.90	5 Q	1:55.13	3 Q	1:55.20	6
Xu Qiheng	200 m freestyle	1:49.32	35	Did not advance			
Yang Zhixian	200 m individual medley	2:00.80	18	Did not advance			
Yang Zhixian	400 m individual medley	4:15.47	8 Q	—N/a		4:16.74	8
Yu Hexin	50 m freestyle	22.51	=20	Did not advance			
Yu Hexin	100 m freestyle	49.50	28	Did not advance			
Yu Hexin	50 m butterfly	23.87	=21	Did not advance			
Ning Zetao; Yu Hexin; Lin Yongqing; Xu Qiheng	4 × 100 m freestyle relay	3:15.47	8 Q	—N/a		3:15.41	7
Xu Qiheng; He Tianqi; Shang Keyuan; Zhang Jie	4 × 200 m freestyle relay	7:16.67	14	—N/a		Did not advance	
Hu Yixuan; Li Xiang; Li Zhuhao; Ning Zetao; Xu Jiayu; Yu Hexin; Zhang Qibin	4 × 100 m medley relay	3:35.21	11	—N/a		Did not advance	

Women

Athlete	Event	Heat		Semifinal		Final	
Athlete	Event	Time	Rank	Time	Rank	Time	Rank
Cao Yue	400 m freestyle	4:09.60	13	—N/a		Did not advance	
Cao Yue	800 m freestyle	8:43.24	25	—N/a		Did not advance	
Chen Jie	100 m backstroke	1:00.58	14 Q	1:00.42	14	Did not advance	
Chen Jie	200 m backstroke	2:11.75	18	Did not advance			
Chen Xinyi	100 m butterfly	58.34	11 Q	57.63	6 Q	57.85	6
Fu Yuanhui	50 m backstroke	27.66	1 Q	27.18	1 Q	27.11	1st place, gold medalist(s)
Fu Yuanhui	100 m backstroke	1:00.55	=12 Q	59.33	4 Q	59.02	4
Guo Junjun	200 m freestyle	1:58.27	=11 Q	1:57.79	12	Did not advance	
He Yun	100 m breaststroke	1:09.17	30	Did not advance			
Liu Xiang	50 m freestyle	24.82	9 Q	24.78	11	Did not advance	
Liu Xiang	50 m backstroke	27.79	4 Q	27.67	4 Q	27.58	3rd place, bronze medalist(s)
Liu Yaxin	200 m backstroke	2:12.30	22	Did not advance			
Lu Ying	50 m butterfly	25.69	4 Q	25.79	4 Q	25.37 AS	3rd place, bronze medalist(s)
Lu Ying	100 m butterfly	57.84	4 Q	57.36	3 Q	57.48	3rd place, bronze medalist(s)
Shao Yiwen	400 m freestyle	4:08.93	11	—N/a		Did not advance	
Shen Duo	100 m freestyle	53.93	6 Q	53.91	7 Q	54.76	8
Shen Duo	200 m freestyle	1:56.75	4 Q	1:56.44	3 Q	1:56.27	6
Shi Jinglin	50 m breaststroke	31.57	24	Did not advance			
Shi Jinglin	100 m breaststroke	1:06.45	2 Q	1:06.28	4 Q	1:06.55	5
Shi Jinglin	200 m breaststroke	2:24.09	10 Q	2:23.06	=8 Q	2:22.76	= (bronze)
Suo Ran	50 m breaststroke	31.12	14 Q	31.03	9 Q	30.74	6
Wang Guoyue	1500 m freestyle	16:28.18	14	—N/a		Did not advance	
Ye Shiwen	200 m individual medley	2:11.23	5 Q	2:11.39	8 Q	2:14.01	8
Ye Shiwen	400 m individual medley	4:42.96	15	—N/a		Did not advance	
Zhang Xinyu	200 m breaststroke	2:28.57	23	Did not advance			
Zhang Yufei	200 m butterfly	2:06.92	1 Q	2:07.08	4 Q	2:06.51	3rd place, bronze medalist(s)
Zhang Yuhan	800 m freestyle	8:35.17	14	—N/a		Did not advance	
Zhou Min	200 m individual medley	2:15.08	=22	Did not advance			
Zhou Min	400 m individual medley	4:50.36		—N/a		Did not advance	
Zhou Yilin	200 m butterfly	2:08.76	10 Q	2:07.69	8 Q	2:10.20	8
Zhu Menghui	50 m freestyle	25.19	17	Did not advance			
Zhu Menghui	100 m freestyle	54.41	12 Q	54.77	16	Did not advance	
Zhu Menghui; Tang Yuting; Fang Yi; Shen Duo	4 × 100 m freestyle relay	3:37.64	=5 Q	—N/a		3:37.64	7
Qiu Yuhan; Guo Junjun; Zhang Yufei; Shen Duo; Shao Yiwen*; Zhang Yuhan*	4 × 200 m freestyle relay	7:54.31	5 Q	—N/a		7:49.10	3rd place, bronze medalist(s)
Chen Xinyi*; Fu Yuanhui; Lu Ying; Shen Duo; Shi Jinglin; Qiu Yuhan*	4 × 100 m medley relay	3:57.04	1 Q	—N/a		3:54.41	1st place, gold medalist(s)

Mixed

Athlete	Event	Heat		Final	
Athlete	Event	Time	Rank	Time	Rank
Yu Hexin; Lin Yongqing; Qiu Yuhan; Tang Yuting	4 × 100 m freestyle relay	3:27.71	6 Q	3:26.94	7
Xu Jiayu; Li Xiang; Lu Ying; Zhu Menghui; Chen Xinyi*	4 × 100 m medley relay	3:47.48	6 Q	3:44.65	4

== Synchronized swimming ==
China has fielded a full squad of synchronized swimmers to compete in each of the following events at the World Championships.

Athlete	Event	Preliminaries		Final	
Athlete	Event	Points	Rank	Points	Rank
Sun Wenyan	Solo technical routine	91.3262	3 Q	91.5479	3rd place, bronze medalist(s)
Huang Xuechen	Solo free routine	95.2000	2 Q	94.9000	2nd place, silver medalist(s)
Huang Xuechen; Sun Wenyan	Duet technical routine	92.2791	2 Q	93.3279	2nd place, silver medalist(s)
Huang Xuechen; Sun Wenyan	Duet free routine	95.4667	2 Q	95.9000	2nd place, silver medalist(s)
Gu Xiao; Guo Li; Huang Xuechen; Li Xiaolu; Liang Xinping; Sun Wenyan; Tang Mengni; Xiao Yanning*; Yin Chengxin*; Zeng Zhen	Team technical routine	92.1032	2 Q	94.4605	2nd place, silver medalist(s)
Gu Xiao; Guo Li; Huang Xuechen*; Li Xiaolu; Liang Xinping; Sun Wenyan; Tang Mengni; Xiao Yanning*; Yin Chengxin; Zeng Zhen	Team free routine	95.5000	2 Q	96.1333	2nd place, silver medalist(s)
Gu Xiao; Guo Li; Huang Xuechen*; Li Mo*; Li Xiaolu; Liang Xinping; Sun Wenyan; Tang Mengni; Xiao Yanning; Yin Chengxin; Zeng Zhen	Free routine combination	94.9333	2 Q	96.2000	2nd place, silver medalist(s)

== Water polo ==
=== Men's tournament ===
Team roster

- Wu Honghui
- Tan Feihu
- Hu Zhangxin
- Dong Tao
- Lu Wenhui
- Li Li
- Chen Zhongxian
- Li Lun
- Xie Zekai
- Chen Jinghao
- Zhang Chufeng
- Liang Nianxiang
- Liang Zhiwei

Group play

Pos	Team	Pld	W	D	L	GF	GA	GD	Pts	Qualification
1	Croatia	3	3	0	0	39	17	+22	6	Advanced to quarterfinals
2	Canada	3	2	0	1	25	20	+5	4	Advanced to playoffs
3	Brazil	3	0	1	2	24	29	−5	1	Advanced to playoffs
4	China	3	0	1	2	12	34	−22	1	

Source: SportResult.com
Rules for classification: 1) points; 2) head-to-head points; 3) head-to-head goal difference; 4) head-to-head number of goals scored; 5) goal difference.

27 July 2015; 10:50	Report	Brazil	9–9	China	Kazan; Attendance: 700; Referees: Stanko Ivanovski (MNE), Vojin Putniković (SRB)
27 July 2015; 10:50	Report	Score by quarters: 3–4, 2–1, 3–4, 1–0			Kazan; Attendance: 700; Referees: Stanko Ivanovski (MNE), Vojin Putniković (SRB)
27 July 2015; 10:50	Report	Perrone 4	Goals	Dong Tao, Zhang Chufeng 3	Kazan; Attendance: 700; Referees: Stanko Ivanovski (MNE), Vojin Putniković (SRB)

29 July 2015; 20:10	Report	China	2–8	Canada	Kazan; Attendance: 240; Referees: Stanko Ivanovski (MNE), György Kun (HUN)
29 July 2015; 20:10	Report	Score by quarters: 0–3, 0–3, 1–1, 1–1			Kazan; Attendance: 240; Referees: Stanko Ivanovski (MNE), György Kun (HUN)
29 July 2015; 20:10	Report	Tan Feihu 2	Goals	McElroy 3	Kazan; Attendance: 240; Referees: Stanko Ivanovski (MNE), György Kun (HUN)

31 July 2015; 17:30	Report	Croatia	17–1	China	Kazan; Attendance: 874; Referees: Daniel Flahive (AUS), Masoud Rezvani (IRI)
31 July 2015; 17:30	Report	Score by quarters: 4–1, 5–0, 7–0, 1–0			Kazan; Attendance: 874; Referees: Daniel Flahive (AUS), Masoud Rezvani (IRI)
31 July 2015; 17:30	Report	three players 3	Goals	Zhang Chufeng 1	Kazan; Attendance: 874; Referees: Daniel Flahive (AUS), Masoud Rezvani (IRI)

13th–16th place semifinals

2 August 2015; 10:50	Report	China	10–10 (PSO)	Russia	Kazan; Attendance: 2,263; Referees: Stanko Ivanovski (MNE), Masoud Rezvani (IRI)
2 August 2015; 10:50	Report	Score by quarters: 1–2, 4–4, 2–1, 3–3 PSO: 1–4			Kazan; Attendance: 2,263; Referees: Stanko Ivanovski (MNE), Masoud Rezvani (IRI)
2 August 2015; 10:50	Report	Tan Feihu 4	Goals	four players 2	Kazan; Attendance: 2,263; Referees: Stanko Ivanovski (MNE), Masoud Rezvani (IRI)

15th place game

4 August 2015; 09:30	Report	China	16–9	Argentina	Kazan; Attendance: 753; Referees: Joseph Peila (USA), Tadao Tahara (JPN)
4 August 2015; 09:30	Report	Score by quarters: 6–2, 3–4, 4–2, 3–1			Kazan; Attendance: 753; Referees: Joseph Peila (USA), Tadao Tahara (JPN)
4 August 2015; 09:30	Report	Dong Tao 4	Goals	Yanez 5	Kazan; Attendance: 753; Referees: Joseph Peila (USA), Tadao Tahara (JPN)

=== Women's tournament ===
Team roster

- Yang Jun
- Tian Jianing
- Mei Xiaohan
- Xiong Dunhan
- Niu Guannan
- Sun Yating
- Song Donglun
- Zhang Cong
- Zhao Zihan
- Zhang Weiwei
- Wang Xinyan
- Zhang Jing
- Peng Lin

Group play

Pos	Team	Pld	W	D	L	GF	GA	GD	Pts	Qualification
1	Russia	3	2	1	0	38	25	+13	5	Advanced to quarterfinals
2	China	3	2	1	0	31	21	+10	5	Advanced to playoffs
3	Hungary	3	1	0	2	37	25	+12	2	Advanced to playoffs
4	France	3	0	0	3	12	47	−35	0	

Source: SportResult.com
Rules for classification: 1) points; 2) head-to-head points; 3) head-to-head goal difference; 4) head-to-head number of goals scored; 5) goal difference.

26 July 2015; 21:30	Report	Hungary	8–9	China	Kazan; Attendance: 200; Referees: Daniel Flahive (AUS), Nenad Peris (CRO)
26 July 2015; 21:30	Report	Score by quarters: 1–4, 4–1, 2–1, 1–3			Kazan; Attendance: 200; Referees: Daniel Flahive (AUS), Nenad Peris (CRO)
26 July 2015; 21:30	Report	Antal 2	Goals	Zhao Zihan 4	Kazan; Attendance: 200; Referees: Daniel Flahive (AUS), Nenad Peris (CRO)

28 July 2015; 17:30	Report	France	4–13	China	Kazan; Attendance: 1,700; Referees: Adrian Alexandrescu (ROU), Peter de Jong (NED)
28 July 2015; 17:30	Report	Score by quarters: 1–2, 1–0, 1–6, 1–5			Kazan; Attendance: 1,700; Referees: Adrian Alexandrescu (ROU), Peter de Jong (NED)
28 July 2015; 17:30	Report	Guillet 2	Goals	Niu Guannan 6	Kazan; Attendance: 1,700; Referees: Adrian Alexandrescu (ROU), Peter de Jong (NED)

30 July 2015; 18:50	Report	Russia	9–9	China	Kazan; Attendance: 2,653; Referees: Georgios Stavridis (GRE), Joseph Peila (USA)
30 July 2015; 18:50	Report	Score by quarters: 3–2, 1–2, 3–2, 2–3			Kazan; Attendance: 2,653; Referees: Georgios Stavridis (GRE), Joseph Peila (USA)
30 July 2015; 18:50	Report	Karimova, Prokofyeva 3	Goals	Niu Guannan 4	Kazan; Attendance: 2,653; Referees: Georgios Stavridis (GRE), Joseph Peila (USA)

Playoffs

1 August 2015; 20:10	Report	Brazil	8–10	China	Kazan; Attendance: 350; Referees: Stephane Roy (CAN), Dion Willis (RSA)
1 August 2015; 20:10	Report	Score by quarters: 1–2, 1–3, 4–3, 2–2			Kazan; Attendance: 350; Referees: Stephane Roy (CAN), Dion Willis (RSA)
1 August 2015; 20:10	Report	Chiappini 5	Goals	three players 2	Kazan; Attendance: 350; Referees: Stephane Roy (CAN), Dion Willis (RSA)

Quarterfinals

3 August 2015; 20:10	Report	Australia	7–7 (PSO)	China	Kazan; Attendance: 370; Referees: Francesc Buch (ESP), Vojin Putniković (SRB)
3 August 2015; 20:10	Report	Score by quarters: 2–3, 0–1, 4–2, 1–1 PSO: 5–3			Kazan; Attendance: 370; Referees: Francesc Buch (ESP), Vojin Putniković (SRB)
3 August 2015; 20:10	Report	seven players 1	Goals	Song Donglun, Zhao Zihan 2	Kazan; Attendance: 370; Referees: Francesc Buch (ESP), Vojin Putniković (SRB)

5th–8th place semifinals

5 August 2015; 15:30	Report	Spain	9–10	China	Kazan; Attendance: 297; Referees: Joseph Peila (USA), Joseph Peila (AUS)
5 August 2015; 15:30	Report	Score by quarters: 3–3, 2–1, 2–4, 2–2			Kazan; Attendance: 297; Referees: Joseph Peila (USA), Joseph Peila (AUS)
5 August 2015; 15:30	Report	Forca 3	Goals	Song Donglun, Zhao Zihan 4	Kazan; Attendance: 297; Referees: Joseph Peila (USA), Joseph Peila (AUS)

Fifth place game

7 August 2015; 15:30	Report	China	9–9 (PSO)	Greece	Kazan; Attendance: 940; Referees: Mark Koganov (AZE), György Kun (HUN)
7 August 2015; 15:30	Report	Score by quarters: 4–2, 1–3, 2–1, 2–3 PSO: 4–3			Kazan; Attendance: 940; Referees: Mark Koganov (AZE), György Kun (HUN)
7 August 2015; 15:30	Report	Niu Guannan 5	Goals	Asimaki 4	Kazan; Attendance: 940; Referees: Mark Koganov (AZE), György Kun (HUN)
