= Swimming at the 2014 Asian Games – Men's 4 × 100 metre medley relay =

Men's 4 × 100 metre medley relay at the 2014 Asian Games
- Venue: Munhak Park Tae-hwan Aquatics Center
- Date: 26 September 2014
- Competitors: 56 from 12 nations

Medalists
gold medal	China; Xu Jiayu, Li Xiang, Li Zhuhao, Ning Zetao, Jin Yan, Mao Feilian, Wang Yuxin, Yu Hexin
silver medal	Japan; Ryosuke Irie, Yasuhiro Koseki, Hirofumi Ikebata, Shinri Shioura
bronze medal	Uzbekistan; Daniil Bukin, Vladislav Mustafin, Islam Aslanov, Khurshidjon Tursunov, Dmitriy Shvetsov, Aleksey Derlyugov, Daniil Tulupov

The Men's 4 x 100 metre medley relay event at the 2014 Asian Games took place on 26 September 2014 at Munhak Park Tae-hwan Aquatics Center.

== Schedule ==
All times are Korea Standard Time (UTC+09:00)

Date	Time	Event
Friday, 26 September 2014	09:00	Heats
Friday, 26 September 2014	20:30	Final

== Records ==
Prior to this competition, the existing world, Asian and Games records were as follows.

World Record	United States	3:27.28	Rome, Italy	2 August 2009
Asian Record	Japan	3:30.74	Rome, Italy	2 August 2009
Games Record	Japan	3:34.10	Guangzhou, China	18 November 2010

== Results ==
Legend

- DNS — Did not start

=== Heats ===
Rank	Heat	Team	Time	Notes
1	2	Japan (JPN)	3:40.00	
		Ryosuke Irie	54.13	
		Yasuhiro Koseki	1:00.61	
		Hirofumi Ikebata	54.14	
		Shinri Shioura	51.12	
2	1	China (CHN)	3:41.69	
		Jin Yan	56.32	
		Mao Feilian	1:01.60	
		Wang Yuxin	53.67	
		Yu Hexin	50.10	
3	1	South Korea (KOR)	3:44.02	
		Im Tae-jeong	57.14	
		Ju Jang-hun	1:01.88	
		Yun Seok-hwan	54.92	
		Kim Sung-kyum	50.08	
4	2	Hong Kong (HKG)	3:45.23	
		Lau Shiu Yue	57.76	
		Ronald Tsui	1:03.45	
		Geoffrey Cheah	53.71	
		Jeremy Wong	50.31	
5	2	Indonesia (INA)	3:45.93	
		I Gede Siman Sudartawa	56.36	
		Dennis Josua Tiwa	1:04.32	
		Glenn Victor Sutanto	54.70	
		Triady Fauzi Sidiq	50.55	
6	2	Singapore (SIN)	3:46.73	
		Rainer Ng	58.29	
		Christopher Cheong	1:04.60	
		Joseph Schooling	53.57	
		Clement Lim	50.27	
7	1	Chinese Taipei (TPE)	3:46.78	
		Lin Chien-liang	57.48	
		Lee Hsuan-yen	1:03.43	
		Hsu Chi-chieh	54.57	
		Wang Yu-lian	51.30	
8	2	Uzbekistan (UZB)	3:50.88	
		Daniil Bukin	58.65	
		Dmitriy Shvetsov	1:04.98	
		Aleksey Derlyugov	55.31	
		Daniil Tulupov	51.94	
9	2	Macau (MAC)	3:51.26	
		Ngou Pok Man	57.26	
		Chou Kit	1:04.17	
		Chao Man Hou	56.68	
		Lao Kuan Fong	53.15	
10	1	Iran (IRI)	3:52.25	
		Jamal Chavoshifar	57.78	
		Aria Nasimi Shad	1:05.98	
		Ahmad Reza Jalali	56.37	
		Arsham Mirzaei	52.12	
11	1	India (IND)	3:53.96	
		P. S. Madhu	57.31	
		Neil Contractor	1:09.92	
		Sajan Prakash	55.28	
		Anshul Kothari	51.45	
—	1	Pakistan (PAK)	DNS	
		—		
		—		
		—		
		—		

=== Final ===
Rank	Team	Time	Notes
1st place, gold medalist(s)	China (CHN)	3:31.37	GR
	Xu Jiayu	53.18	
	Li Xiang	59.84	
	Li Zhuhao	51.44	
	Ning Zetao	46.91	
2nd place, silver medalist(s)	Japan (JPN)	3:31.70	
	Ryosuke Irie	52.45	
	Yasuhiro Koseki	59.03	
	Hirofumi Ikebata	52.12	
	Shinri Shioura	48.10	
3rd place, bronze medalist(s)	Uzbekistan (UZB)	3:43.54	
	Daniil Bukin	57.83	
	Vladislav Mustafin	1:01.51	
	Islam Aslanov	54.67	
	Khurshidjon Tursunov	49.53	
4	Indonesia (INA)	3:43.81	
	I Gede Siman Sudartawa	56.05	
	Dennis Josua Tiwa	1:03.57	
	Glenn Victor Sutanto	53.65	
	Triady Fauzi Sidiq	50.54	
5	Singapore (SIN)	3:44.17	
	Rainer Ng	57.62	
	Christopher Cheong	1:03.36	
	Joseph Schooling	53.75	
	Clement Lim	49.44	
6	Chinese Taipei (TPE)	3:44.77	
	Lin Shih-chieh	57.52	
	Lee Hsuan-yen	1:03.31	
	Hsu Chi-chieh	54.09	
	Wang Yu-lian	49.85	
7	Hong Kong (HKG)	3:44.83	
	Lau Shiu Yue	57.61	
	Ronald Tsui	1:03.32	
	Geoffrey Cheah	53.63	
	Jeremy Wong	50.27	
DQ	South Korea (KOR)	~~3:39.18~~	
	Park Seon-kwan	54.80	
	Choi Kyu-woong	1:01.13	
	Chang Gyu-cheol	53.44	
	Park Tae-hwan	49.81	

- South Korea originally won the bronze medal, but was later disqualified after Park Tae-hwan tested positive for Nebido.
