= 2014 FINA World Swimming Championships (25 m) – Men's 200 metre breaststroke =

Men's 200 metre breaststroke at the 2014 FINA World Swimming Championships (25 m)
- Dates: 5 December
- Competitors: 55 from 44 nations
- Winning time: 2:01.49

Medalists
| gold medal | Dániel Gyurta | Hungary |
| silver medal | Marco Koch | Germany |
| bronze medal | Kirill Prigoda | Russia |

The Men's 200 metre breaststroke competition of the 2014 FINA World Swimming Championships (25 m) was held on 5 December.

== Records ==
Prior to the competition, the existing world and championship records were as follows.

| | Name | Nation | Time | Location | Date |
|---|---|---|---|---|---|
| World record | Dániel Gyurta | Hungary | 2:00.48 | Dubai | 31 August 2014 |
| Championship record | Dániel Gyurta | Hungary | 2:01.35 | Istanbul | 14 December 2012 |

== Results ==
=== Heats ===
The heats were held at 13:08.

| Rank | Heat | Lane | Name | Nationality | Time | Notes |
|---|---|---|---|---|---|---|
| 1 | 6 | 4 | Dániel Gyurta | Hungary | 2:03.64 | Q |
| 2 | 4 | 4 | Yasuhiro Koseki | Japan | 2:04.04 | Q |
| 3 | 4 | 5 | Kirill Prigoda | Russia | 2:04.18 | Q |
| 4 | 5 | 4 | Marco Koch | Germany | 2:04.20 | Q |
| 5 | 6 | 5 | Oleg Kostin | Russia | 2:04.46 | Q |
| 6 | 6 | 6 | Felipe França Silva | Brazil | 2:04.63 | Q |
| 7 | 5 | 6 | Yuta Oshikiri | Japan | 2:04.90 | Q |
| 8 | 6 | 3 | Tomáš Klobučník | Slovakia | 2:05.01 | Q |
| 9 | 4 | 3 | Cody Miller | United States | 2:06.03 | |
| 10 | 6 | 8 | B.J. Johnson | United States | 2:06.24 | |
| 11 | 5 | 5 | Thiago Simon | Brazil | 2:06.42 | |
| 12 | 6 | 7 | Giedrius Titenis | Lithuania | 2:07.42 | |
| 13 | 4 | 2 | David Horvath | Hungary | 2:07.50 | |
| 14 | 4 | 1 | Adam Peaty | Great Britain | 2:07.56 | |
| 15 | 6 | 2 | Jake Packard | Australia | 2:07.86 | |
| 16 | 3 | 4 | Andriy Kovalenko | Ukraine | 2:08.02 | |
| 17 | 4 | 7 | Valeriy Dymo | Ukraine | 2:08.10 | |
| 18 | 4 | 6 | Laurent Carnol | Luxembourg | 2:08.22 | |
| 19 | 5 | 1 | Jorge Murillo | Colombia | 2:08.87 | NR |
| 20 | 5 | 7 | Glenn Snyders | New Zealand | 2:09.10 | |
| 21 | 3 | 5 | Vladislav Mustafin | Uzbekistan | 2:09.46 | |
| 22 | 5 | 2 | Chris Christensen | Denmark | 2:09.64 | |
| 23 | 5 | 8 | Martin Allikvee | Estonia | 2:09.75 | |
| 24 | 3 | 7 | Azad Al-Barazi | Syria | 2:10.21 | |
| 25 | 3 | 6 | Sverre Næss | Norway | 2:10.40 | |
| 26 | 4 | 0 | Chao Man Hou | Macau | 2:11.45 | |
| 27 | 5 | 0 | Josué Domínguez | Dominican Republic | 2:11.71 | |
| 28 | 6 | 9 | Alpkan Örnek | Turkey | 2:11.82 | |
| 29 | 4 | 8 | Christoph Meier | Liechtenstein | 2:12.17 | |
| 29 | 5 | 9 | Irakli Bolkvadze | Georgia | 2:12.17 | |
| 31 | 4 | 9 | Joshua Hall | Philippines | 2:13.61 | |
| 32 | 6 | 0 | Ahmad Al-Bader | Kuwait | 2:13.63 | |
| 33 | 3 | 0 | Anton Zheltiakov | Azerbaijan | 2:14.09 | |
| 34 | 3 | 1 | Davletbaev Damir | Kyrgyzstan | 2:15.26 | |
| 35 | 2 | 4 | Julian Fletcher | Bermuda | 2:16.25 | |
| 36 | 3 | 8 | Rafael van Leeuwaarde | Suriname | 2:16.83 | |
| 37 | 3 | 3 | Lee Hsuan-yen | Chinese Taipei | 2:18.06 | |
| 38 | 2 | 2 | James Lawson | Zimbabwe | 2:18.88 | |
| 39 | 2 | 6 | Jésus Flores | Honduras | 2:19.06 | |
| 40 | 3 | 9 | Micah Fernandes | Kenya | 2:20.35 | |
| 41 | 2 | 0 | Kiran Jasinghe | Sri Lanka | 2:21.61 | |
| 42 | 2 | 3 | Yosif Al-Musallam | Kuwait | 2:21.90 | |
| 43 | 2 | 5 | Ramazan Taimatov | Kyrgyzstan | 2:23.69 | |
| 44 | 1 | 2 | Matthew Shone | Zambia | 2:30.64 | |
| 45 | 1 | 4 | Deni Baholli | Albania | 2:30.88 | |
| 46 | 2 | 1 | Douglas Miller | Fiji | 2:31.13 | |
| 47 | 2 | 7 | Walid Daloul | Qatar | 2:33.50 | |
| 48 | 1 | 5 | Pierre-Andre Adam | Seychelles | 2:35.28 | |
| 49 | 2 | 8 | Brandon Schuster | Samoa | 2:35.71 | |
| 50 | 2 | 9 | Abdullah Al-Yehari | Qatar | 2:38.73 | |
| 51 | 1 | 6 | Nikolas Sylvester | Saint Vincent and the Grenadines | 2:40.90 | |
| 52 | 1 | 3 | Binald Mahmuti | Albania | 2:41.86 | |
| 53 | 1 | 7 | Tanner Poppe | Guam | 2:51.04 | |
| 54 | 1 | 1 | Justin Payet | Seychelles | 3:12.82 | |
| — | 5 | 3 | Giacomo Perez-Dortona | France | | DNS |
| — | 6 | 1 | Li Xiang | China | | DNS |
| — | 3 | 2 | Arnoldo Herrera | Costa Rica | | DSQ |

=== Final ===
The final was held at 18:38.

| Rank | Lane | Name | Nationality | Time | Notes |
|---|---|---|---|---|---|
| 1st place, gold medalist(s) | 4 | Dániel Gyurta | Hungary | 2:01.49 | |
| 2nd place, silver medalist(s) | 6 | Marco Koch | Germany | 2:01.91 | |
| 3rd place, bronze medalist(s) | 3 | Kirill Prigoda | Russia | 2:02.38 | |
| 4 | 5 | Yasuhiro Koseki | Japan | 2:02.45 | |
| 5 | 8 | Tomáš Klobučník | Slovakia | 2:04.29 | |
| 6 | 1 | Yuta Oshikiri | Japan | 2:05.09 | |
| 7 | 7 | Felipe França Silva | Brazil | 2:06.74 | |
| — | 2 | Oleg Kostin | Russia | | DSQ |
