= Swimming at the 2015 World Aquatics Championships – Men's 4 × 100 metre medley relay =

Men's 4 × 100 metre medley relay at the 2015 World Aquatics Championships
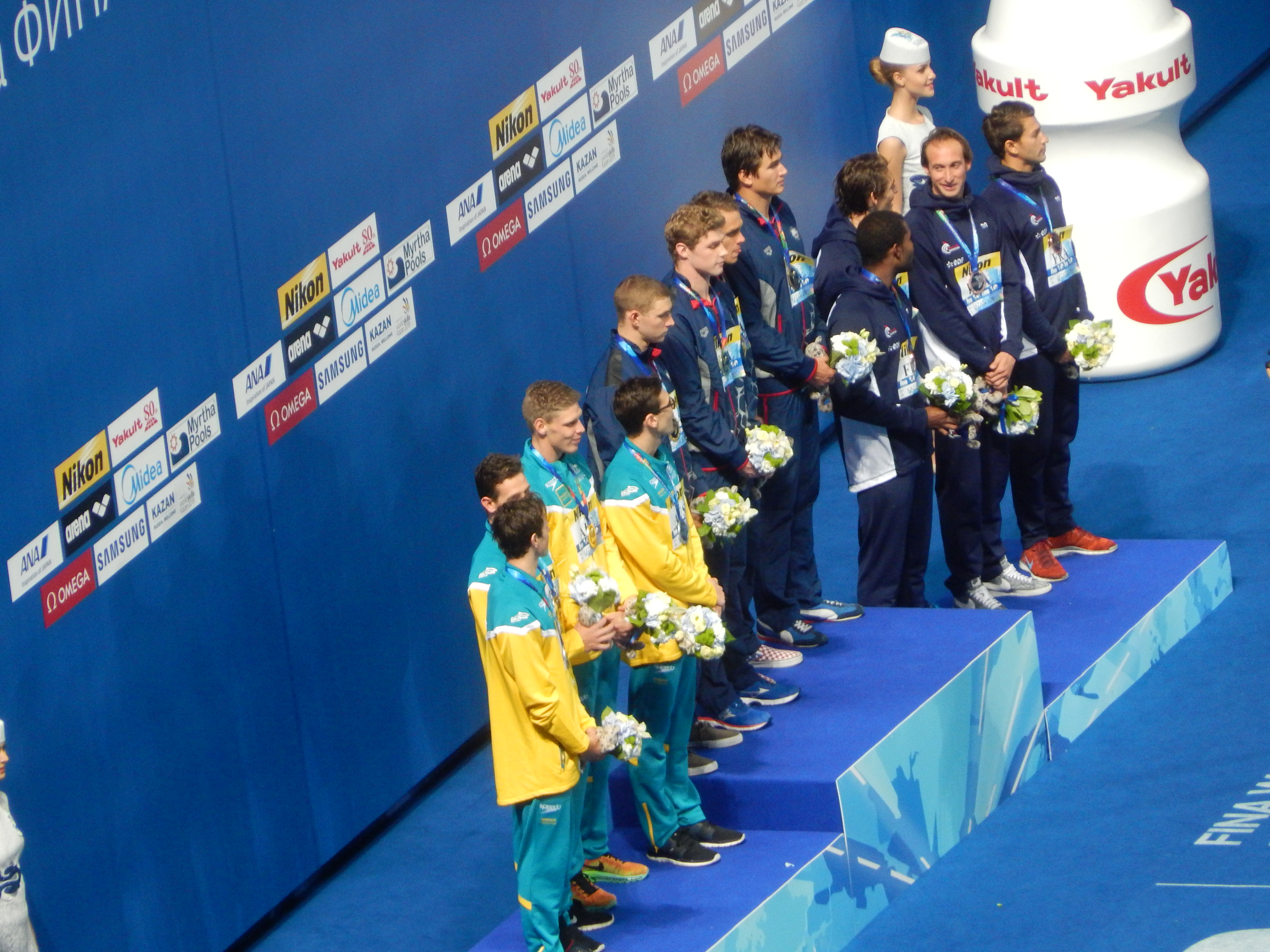
- Victory Ceremony
- Dates: 9 August (heats and final)
- Competitors: 127 from 29 nations
- Winning time: 3:29.93

Medalists
gold medal	Ryan Murphy; Kevin Cordes; Tom Shields; Nathan Adrian; Matt Grevers; Cody Miller; Tim Phillips; Ryan Lochte	United States
silver medal	Mitch Larkin; Jake Packard; Jayden Hadler; Cameron McEvoy; David Morgan; Kyle Chalmers	Australia
bronze medal	Camille Lacourt; Giacomo Perez-Dortona; Mehdy Metella; Fabien Gilot	France

The Men's 4 × 100 metre medley relay competition of the swimming events at the 2015 World Aquatics Championships was held on 9 August with the heats and final.

== Records ==
Prior to the competition, the existing world and championship records were as follows.

World record	United States	3:27.28	Rome, Italy	2 August 2009
Competition record	United States	3:27.28	Rome, Italy	2 August 2009

== Results ==
=== Heats ===
The heats were held at 10:27.

Rank	Heat	Lane	Nation	Swimmers	Time	Notes
1	4	1	United States	Matt Grevers (52.85); Cody Miller (59.23); Tim Phillips (51.03); Ryan Lochte (47.95)	3:31.06	Q
2	3	6	Australia	Mitch Larkin (52.37); Jake Packard (59.87); David Morgan (51.76); Kyle Chalmers (47.86)	3:31.86	Q
3	2	7	France	Camille Lacourt (53.50); Giacomo Perez-Dortona (1:00.06); Mehdy Metella (50.88); Fabien Gilot (48.07)	3:32.51	Q
4	4	4	Japan	Ryosuke Irie (53.23); Yasuhiro Koseki (59.65); Takuro Fujii (51.59); Shinri Shioura (48.35)	3:32.82	Q
5	1	5	Germany	Jan-Philip Glania (53.51); Hendrik Feldwehr (59.37); Steffen Deibler (51.76); Christoph Fildebrandt (48.30)	3:32.94	Q
6	2	6	Great Britain	Chris Walker-Hebborn (53.70); Ross Murdoch (59.20); Adam Barrett (52.29); Ben Proud (48.18)	3:33.37	Q
7	4	3	Poland	Radosław Kawęcki (53.90); Marcin Stolarski (1:00.66); Paweł Korzeniowski (51.30); Konrad Czerniak (47.64)	3:33.50	Q, NR
8	4	8	Russia	Grigory Tarasevich (54.09); Ilya Khomenko (59.58); Daniil Pakhomov (51.83); Alexandr Sukhorukov (48.52)	3:34.02	Q
9	3	3	Italy	Simone Sabbioni (54.17); Andrea Toniato (1:00.21); Matteo Rivolta (52.00); Marco Orsi (48.21)	3:34.59	
10	3	4	Brazil	Guilherme Guido (53.94); Felipe Lima (59.59); Arthur Mendes (52.86); Marcelo Chierighini (48.34)	3:34.73	
11	4	0	China	Xu Jiayu (53.44); Li Xiang (1:00.78); Li Zhuhao (51.61); Lin Yongqing (49.38)	3:35.21	
12	2	1	Lithuania	Danas Rapšys (54.71); Giedrius Titenis (58.96); Tadas Duškinas (52.69); Mindaugas Sadauskas (48.94)	3:35.30	NR
13	2	2	Canada	Russell Wood (54.95); Richard Funk (1:00.05); Santo Condorelli (52.29); Yuri Kisil (48.43)	3:35.72	
14	3	1	Greece	Apostolos Christou (55.43); Panagiotis Samilidis (1:01.44); Andreas Vazaios (52.42); Kristian Golomeev (48.57)	3:37.86	
15	2	5	Belarus	Pavel Sankovich (55.22); Ilya Shymanovich (1:02.24); Yauhen Tsurkin (51.66); Artsiom Machekin (49.11)	3:38.23	
16	3	2	New Zealand	Corey Main (54.40); Glenn Snyders (1:00.11); Bradlee Ashby (54.50); Matthew Stanley (49.68)	3:38.69	
17	1	4	Switzerland	Nils Liess (55.71); Yannick Käser (1:00.33); Nico van Duijn (53.03); Alexandre Haldemann (49.87)	3:38.94	NR
18	1	3	Turkey	Doruk Tekin (56.35); Demir Atasoy (1:01.62); Kaan Türker Ayar (53.99); Kemal Arda Gürdal (48.50)	3:40.46	NR
19	2	0	Singapore	Quah Zheng Wen (54.41); Khoo Chien Yin Lionel (1:02.50); Joseph Schooling (52.79); Yeo Kai Quan (51.23)	3:40.93	
20	3	7	Colombia	Omar Pinzón (55.11); Jorge Murillo (1:00.52); Esnaider Reales (54.33); Mateo de Angulo (51.48)	3:41.44	
21	4	6	Egypt	Mohamed Khaled (56.55); Youssef El-Kamash (1:01.85); Omar Eissa (53.73); Marwan El-Kamash (49.84)	3:41.97	NR
22	2	4	Uzbekistan	Daniil Bukin (57.53); Vladislav Mustafin (1:00.68); Aleksey Derlyugov (54.64); Daniil Tulupov (49.48)	3:42.33	
23	4	9	Estonia	Ralf Tribuntsov (55.03/ NR); Martin Allikvee (1:01.40); Martin Liivamägi (54.83); Martti Aljand (51.89)	3:43.15	
24	3	5	Czech Republic	Roman Dmytrijev (57.45); Petr Bartůněk (1:03.69); Jan Šefl (54.11); Martin Verner (48.96)	3:44.21	
25	2	8	Luxembourg	Raphaël Stacchiotti (57.51); Laurent Carnol (1:00.76); Julien Henx (55.04); Pit Brandenburger (50.91)	3:44.22	
26	3	9	Latvia	Janis Šaltans (56.36); Daniils Bobrovs (1:02.60); Nikolajs Maskalenko (56.11); Uvis Kalniņš (50.51)	3:45.58	
27	3	8	Kuwait	Yousef Al-Askari (1:01.13); Ahmad Al-Bader (1:03.51); Abbas Qali (54.39); Mohammad Madwa (51.72)	3:50.75	NR
	2	3	Mexico			DNS
	3	0	Azerbaijan			DNS
	4	5	India			DNS
	4	2	Venezuela	Carlos Omaña (DSQ); Carlos Claverie; Albert Subirats; Cristian Quintero		DSQ
	4	7	Hungary	Gábor Balog (54.06); Dániel Gyurta (DSQ); László Cseh; Krisztián Takács		DSQ

=== Final ===
The final was held at 19:07.

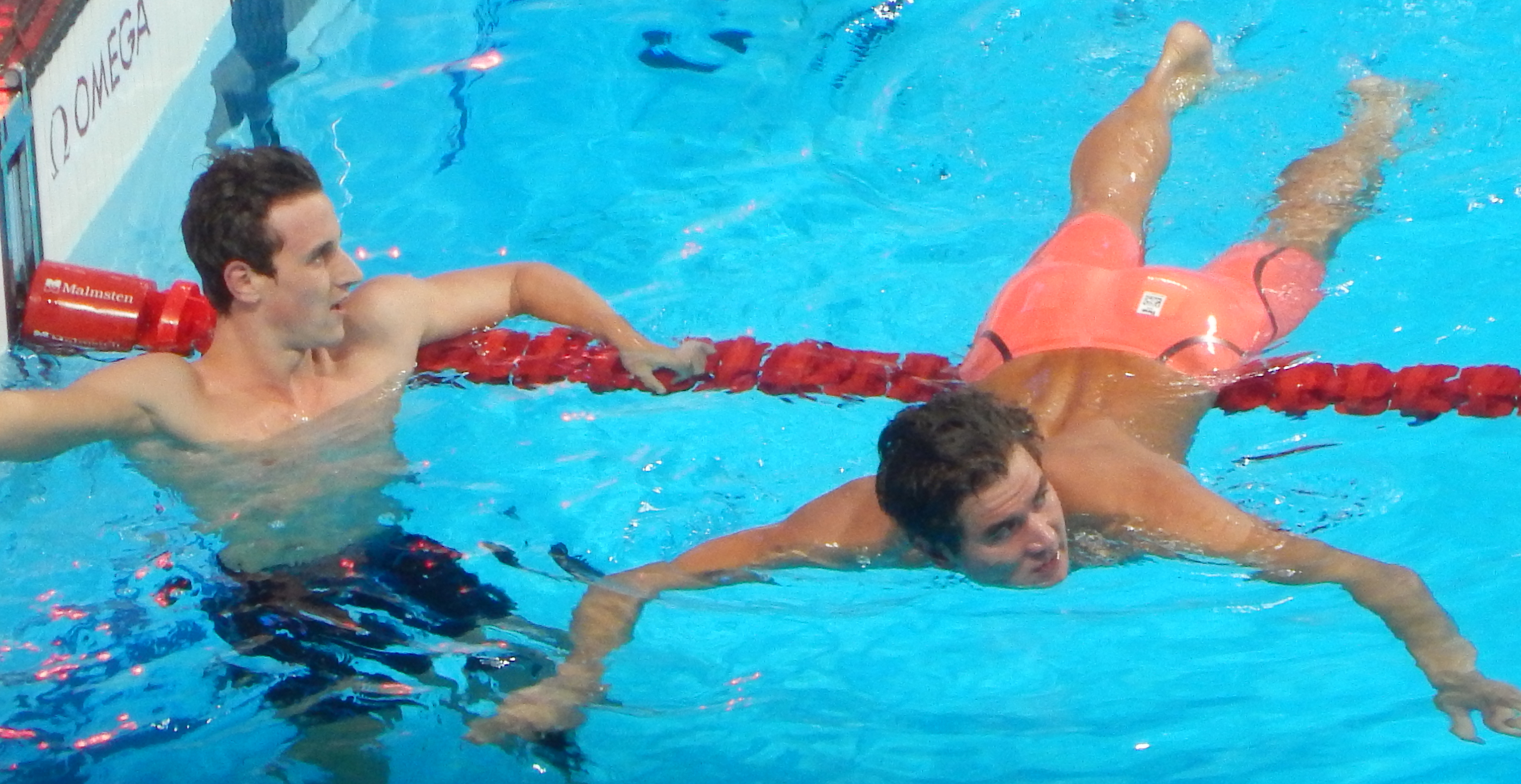
Adrian and McEvoy after finish

Rank	Lane	Nation	Swimmers	Time	Notes
1st place, gold medalist(s)	4	United States	Ryan Murphy (53.05); Kevin Cordes (58.88); Tom Shields (50.59); Nathan Adrian (47.41)	3:29.93	
2nd place, silver medalist(s)	5	Australia	Mitch Larkin (52.41); Jake Packard (59.16); Jayden Hadler (51.91); Cameron McEvoy (46.60)	3:30.08	
3rd place, bronze medalist(s)	3	France	Camille Lacourt (52.81); Giacomo Perez-Dortona (59.88); Mehdy Metella (50.39); Fabien Gilot (47.42)	3:30.50	
4	7	Great Britain	Chris Walker-Hebborn (53.23); Adam Peaty (57.74); James Guy (51.62); Ben Proud (48.08)	3:30.67	NR
5	8	Russia	Evgeny Rylov (53.21); Kirill Prigoda (59.11); Daniil Pakhomov (51.17); Vladimir Morozov (47.41)	3:30.90	
6	6	Japan	Ryosuke Irie (53.05); Yasuhiro Koseki (59.31); Takuro Fujii (51.15); Shinri Shioura (47.59)	3:31.10	
7	2	Germany	Jan-Philip Glania (53.48); Hendrik Feldwehr (59.15); Steffen Deibler (51.27); Christoph Fildebrandt (48.26)	3:32.16	
8	1	Poland	Radosław Kawęcki (54.25); Marcin Stolarski (1:00.57); Paweł Korzeniowski (51.14); Konrad Czerniak (48.38)	3:34.34	
