= Swimming at the 2014 Asian Games – Men's 100 metre breaststroke =

Men's 100 metre breaststroke at the 2014 Asian Games
- Venue: Munhak Park Tae-hwan Aquatics Center
- Date: 24 September 2014
- Competitors: 28 from 19 nations

Medalists
| gold medal | Dmitriy Balandin | Kazakhstan |
| silver medal | Yasuhiro Koseki | Japan |
| bronze medal | Li Xiang | China |

The men's 100 metre breaststroke event at the 2014 Asian Games took place on 24 September 2014 at Munhak Park Tae-hwan Aquatics Center.

== Schedule ==
All times are Korea Standard Time (UTC+09:00)

| Date | Time | Event |
|---|---|---|
| Wednesday, 24 September 2014 | 09:00 | Heats |
| Wednesday, 24 September 2014 | 19:21 | Final |

== Records ==
Prior to this competition, the existing world, Asian and Games records were as follows.

| World Record | Cameron van der Burgh (RSA) | 58.46 | London, United Kingdom | 29 July 2012 |
| Asian Record | Kosuke Kitajima (JPN) | 58.90 | Tokyo, Japan | 3 April 2012 |
| Games Record | Ryo Tateishi (JPN) | 1:00.38 | Guangzhou, China | 15 November 2010 |

== Results ==
=== Heats ===
| Rank | Heat | Athlete | Time | Notes |
|---|---|---|---|---|
| 1 | 4 | Yasuhiro Koseki (JPN) | 1:01.39 | |
| 2 | 4 | Dmitriy Balandin (KAZ) | 1:01.55 | |
| 3 | 4 | Vladislav Mustafin (UZB) | 1:01.64 | |
| 4 | 2 | Li Xiang (CHN) | 1:01.91 | |
| 5 | 3 | Naoya Tomita (JPN) | 1:02.20 | |
| 6 | 3 | Ju Jang-hun (KOR) | 1:02.33 | |
| 7 | 3 | Choi Kyu-woong (KOR) | 1:02.39 | |
| 8 | 2 | Mao Feilian (CHN) | 1:02.76 | |
| 9 | 2 | Radomyos Matjiur (THA) | 1:03.05 | |
| 10 | 3 | Lee Hsuan-yen (TPE) | 1:03.07 | |
| 11 | 3 | Sandeep Sejwal (IND) | 1:03.09 | |
| 12 | 2 | Joshua Hall (PHI) | 1:03.26 | |
| 13 | 2 | Nuttapong Ketin (THA) | 1:03.28 | |
| 14 | 3 | Ronald Tsui (HKG) | 1:03.77 | |
| 15 | 4 | Cai Bing-rong (TPE) | 1:03.82 | |
| 16 | 4 | Ahmad Al-Bader (KUW) | 1:04.12 | |
| 17 | 4 | Wong Chun Yan (HKG) | 1:04.13 | |
| 18 | 4 | Chao Man Hou (MAC) | 1:04.44 | |
| 19 | 2 | Dennis Josua Tiwa (INA) | 1:04.57 | |
| 20 | 2 | Christopher Cheong (SIN) | 1:04.68 | |
| 21 | 3 | Chou Kit (MAC) | 1:04.89 | |
| 22 | 4 | Dmitriy Shvetsov (UZB) | 1:05.62 | |
| 23 | 3 | Mubarak Mohamed Al-Besher (UAE) | 1:05.81 | |
| 24 | 2 | Aria Nasimi Shad (IRI) | 1:06.02 | |
| 25 | 1 | Kameil Al-Qallaf (KSA) | 1:12.31 | |
| 26 | 1 | Baasandorjiin Amarbold (MGL) | 1:12.48 | |
| 27 | 1 | Erdenebilegiin Byambasüren (MGL) | 1:13.87 | |
| 28 | 1 | Yokubdzhon Umarov (TJK) | 1:23.35 | |

=== Final ===
| Rank | Athlete | Time | Notes |
|---|---|---|---|
| 1st place, gold medalist(s) | Dmitriy Balandin (KAZ) | 59.92 | GR |
| 2nd place, silver medalist(s) | Yasuhiro Koseki (JPN) | 1:00.23 | |
| 3rd place, bronze medalist(s) | Li Xiang (CHN) | 1:00.91 | |
| 4 | Naoya Tomita (JPN) | 1:01.25 | |
| 5 | Mao Feilian (CHN) | 1:01.34 | |
| 6 | Choi Kyu-woong (KOR) | 1:01.60 | |
| 7 | Vladislav Mustafin (UZB) | 1:02.24 | |
| 8 | Ju Jang-hun (KOR) | 1:02.44 | |
