= Swimming at the 2014 Asian Games – Men's 4 × 200 metre freestyle relay =

Men's 4 × 200 metre freestyle relay at the 2014 Asian Games
- Venue: Munhak Park Tae-hwan Aquatics Center
- Date: 22 September 2014
- Competitors: 32 from 8 nations

Medalists
| gold medal | Japan; Yuki Kobori, Kosuke Hagino, Daiya Seto, Takeshi Matsuda |
| silver medal | China; Li Yunqi, Lin Yongqing, Mao Feilian, Xu Qiheng |
| bronze medal | Singapore; Danny Yeo, Pang Sheng Jun, Teo Zhen Ren, Clement Lim |

The men's 4 × 200 metre freestyle relay event at the 2014 Asian Games took place on 22 September 2014 at Munhak Park Tae-hwan Aquatics Center.

== Schedule ==
All times are Korea Standard Time (UTC+09:00)

| Date | Time | Event |
|---|---|---|
| Monday, 22 September 2014 | 20:24 | Final |

== Records ==
Prior to this competition, the existing world, Asian and Games records were as follows.

| World Record | United States | 6:58.55 | Rome, Italy | 31 July 2009 |
| Asian Record | Japan | 7:02.26 | Rome, Italy | 31 July 2009 |
| Games Record | China | 7:07.68 | Guangzhou, China | 15 November 2010 |

== Results ==
| Rank | Team | Time | Notes |
|---|---|---|---|
| 1st place, gold medalist(s) | Japan (JPN) | 7:06.74 | GR |
| | Yuki Kobori | 1:47.15 | |
| | Kosuke Hagino | 1:44.97 | |
| | Daiya Seto | 1:47.45 | |
| | Takeshi Matsuda | 1:47.17 | |
| 2nd place, silver medalist(s) | China (CHN) | 7:16.51 | |
| | Li Yunqi | 1:49.60 | |
| | Lin Yongqing | 1:48.54 | |
| | Mao Feilian | 1:49.23 | |
| | Xu Qiheng | 1:49.14 | |
| 3rd place, bronze medalist(s) | Singapore (SIN) | 7:25.46 | |
| | Danny Yeo | 1:49.68 | |
| | Pang Sheng Jun | 1:51.79 | |
| | Teo Zhen Ren | 1:52.79 | |
| | Clement Lim | 1:51.20 | |
| 4 | Chinese Taipei (TPE) | 7:29.28 | |
| | Wang Yu-lian | 1:50.39 | |
| | Wen Ren-hau | 1:54.68 | |
| | Hsiao Fu-yu | 1:52.20 | |
| | Huang Yen-hsin | 1:52.01 | |
| 5 | India (IND) | 7:34.50 | |
| | Aaron D'Souza | 1:51.67 | |
| | Sajan Prakash | 1:53.45 | |
| | Neil Contractor | 1:54.29 | |
| | Saurabh Sangvekar | 1:55.09 | |
| 6 | Hong Kong (HKG) | 7:34.57 | |
| | Derick Ng | 1:54.44 | |
| | Kong Kei Koi | 1:54.08 | |
| | Kent Cheung | 1:52.54 | |
| | David Wong | 1:53.51 | |
| 7 | Macau (MAC) | 8:00.83 | |
| | Ngou Pok Man | 1:55.18 | |
| | Chou Kit | 2:00.93 | |
| | Lao Kuan Fong | 2:04.98 | |
| | Chao Man Hou | 1:59.74 | |
| DQ | South Korea (KOR) | ~~7:21.37~~ | |
| | Nam Ki-woong | 1:51.78 | |
| | Yang June-hyuck | 1:49.07 | |
| | Jeong Jeong-soo | 1:50.78 | |
| | Park Tae-hwan | 1:49.74 | |

- South Korea originally won the bronze medal, but was later disqualified after Park Tae-hwan tested positive for Nebido.
