= Swimming at the 2014 Asian Games – Men's 200 metre breaststroke =

Men's 200 metre breaststroke at the 2014 Asian Games
- Venue: Munhak Park Tae-hwan Aquatics Center
- Date: 23 September 2014
- Competitors: 21 from 13 nations

Medalists
gold medal	Dmitriy Balandin	Kazakhstan
silver medal	Kazuki Kohinata	Japan
bronze medal	Yasuhiro Koseki	Japan

The men's 200 metre breaststroke event at the 2014 Asian Games took place on 23 September 2014 at Munhak Park Tae-hwan Aquatics Center.

== Schedule ==
All times are Korea Standard Time (UTC+09:00)

Date	Time	Event
Tuesday, 23 September 2014	09:00	Heats
Tuesday, 23 September 2014	19:43	Final

== Records ==
Prior to this competition, the existing world, Asian and Games records were as follows.

World Record	Akihiro Yamaguchi (JPN)	2:07.01	Gifu, Japan	15 September 2012
Asian Record	Akihiro Yamaguchi (JPN)	2:07.01	Gifu, Japan	15 September 2012
Games Record	Kosuke Kitajima (JPN)	2:09.97	Busan, South Korea	2 October 2002

== Results ==
=== Heats ===
Rank	Heat	Athlete	Time	Notes
1	2	Dmitriy Balandin (KAZ)	2:11.11	
2	2	Kazuki Kohinata (JPN)	2:11.28	
3	3	Choi Kyu-woong (KOR)	2:13.91	
4	3	Yasuhiro Koseki (JPN)	2:14.03	
5	3	Mao Feilian (CHN)	2:14.50	
6	1	Li Xiang (CHN)	2:14.76	
7	2	Nuttapong Ketin (THA)	2:15.18	
8	1	Vladislav Mustafin (UZB)	2:15.19	
9	1	Ju Jang-hun (KOR)	2:15.25	
10	1	Lee Hsuan-yen (TPE)	2:16.25	
11	2	Cai Bing-rong (TPE)	2:16.82	
12	2	Radomyos Matjiur (THA)	2:17.12	
13	3	Ahmad Al-Bader (KUW)	2:17.23	
14	3	Chao Man Hou (MAC)	2:19.20	
15	1	Dmitriy Shvetsov (UZB)	2:19.53	
16	1	Ronald Tsui (HKG)	2:19.68	
17	3	Aria Nasimi Shad (IRI)	2:20.02	
18	3	Christopher Cheong (SIN)	2:20.81	
19	2	Mehdi Ansari (IRI)	2:23.12	
20	2	Sutton Choi (HKG)	2:29.50	
21	1	Kameil Al-Qallaf (KSA)	2:42.85	

=== Final ===
Rank	Athlete	Time	Notes
1st place, gold medalist(s)	Dmitriy Balandin (KAZ)	2:07.67	GR
2nd place, silver medalist(s)	Kazuki Kohinata (JPN)	2:09.45	
3rd place, bronze medalist(s)	Yasuhiro Koseki (JPN)	2:09.48	
4	Mao Feilian (CHN)	2:11.31	
5	Li Xiang (CHN)	2:12.05	
6	Choi Kyu-woong (KOR)	2:12.53	
7	Nuttapong Ketin (THA)	2:14.29	
8	Vladislav Mustafin (UZB)	2:14.97	
