= Swimming at the 2014 Asian Games – Men's 100 metre freestyle =

Men's 100 metre freestyle at the 2014 Asian Games
- Venue: Munhak Park Tae-hwan Aquatics Center
- Date: 25 September 2014
- Competitors: 40 from 26 nations

Medalists
| gold medal | Ning Zetao | China |
| silver medal | Shinri Shioura | Japan |
| bronze medal | Rammaru Harada | Japan |

The men's 100 metre freestyle event at the 2014 Asian Games took place on 25 September 2014 at Munhak Park Tae-hwan Aquatics Center.

== Schedule ==
All times are Korea Standard Time (UTC+09:00)

| Date | Time | Event |
|---|---|---|
| Thursday, 25 September 2014 | 09:00 | Heats |
| Thursday, 25 September 2014 | 19:24 | Final |

== Records ==
Prior to this competition, the existing world, Asian and Games records were as follows.

| World Record | César Cielo (BRA) | 46.91 | Rome, Italy | 30 July 2009 |
| Asian Record | Ning Zetao (CHN) | 48.27 | Shenyang, China | 8 September 2013 |
| Games Record | Park Tae-hwan (KOR) | 48.70 | Guangzhou, China | 17 November 2010 |

== Results ==
Legend

- DNS — Did not start

=== Heats ===
| Rank | Heat | Athlete | Time | Notes |
|---|---|---|---|---|
| 1 | 3 | Park Tae-hwan (KOR) | ~~49.76~~ | |
| 2 | 4 | Rammaru Harada (JPN) | 50.20 | |
| 3 | 4 | Ning Zetao (CHN) | 50.43 | |
| 3 | 5 | Geoffrey Cheah (HKG) | 50.43 | |
| 5 | 3 | Yu Hexin (CHN) | 50.54 | |
| 6 | 5 | Shinri Shioura (JPN) | 50.59 | |
| 7 | 4 | Hoàng Quý Phước (VIE) | 50.65 | |
| 8 | 4 | Clement Lim (SIN) | 50.86 | |
| 9 | 5 | Jeremy Wong (HKG) | 50.93 | |
| 10 | 5 | Wang Yu-lian (TPE) | 51.01 | |
| 11 | 3 | Aleksey Derlyugov (UZB) | 51.18 | |
| 12 | 5 | Aaron D'Souza (IND) | 51.20 | |
| 13 | 3 | Daniil Tulupov (UZB) | 51.37 | |
| 14 | 3 | Danny Yeo (SIN) | 51.43 | |
| 15 | 5 | Alwyn Tan (MAS) | 51.47 | |
| 16 | 4 | Triady Fauzi Sidiq (INA) | 51.48 | |
| 17 | 4 | Jessie Lacuna (PHI) | 51.89 | |
| 18 | 2 | Ngou Pok Man (MAC) | 51.91 | |
| 19 | 4 | Mohammad Madwa (KUW) | 52.55 | |
| 20 | 2 | Ahmad Reza Jalali (IRI) | 52.69 | |
| 20 | 4 | Alexis Wijaya Ohmar (INA) | 52.69 | |
| 22 | 3 | Lin Chien-liang (TPE) | 52.90 | |
| 23 | 5 | Neil Contractor (IND) | 53.01 | |
| 24 | 2 | Arsham Mirzaei (IRI) | 53.14 | |
| 25 | 2 | Mohamed Al-Mheiri (UAE) | 54.96 | |
| 26 | 2 | Sergeý Krowýakow (TKM) | 55.52 | |
| 27 | 2 | Issa Al-Adawi (OMA) | 55.81 | |
| 28 | 3 | Lao Kuan Fong (MAC) | 55.94 | |
| 29 | 2 | Ahmed Al-Hashem (KSA) | 55.97 | |
| 30 | 2 | Myagmaryn Delgerkhüü (MGL) | 56.53 | |
| 31 | 1 | Muhammad Saad Amin (PAK) | 58.49 | |
| 32 | 1 | Sirish Gurung (NEP) | 58.72 | |
| 33 | 5 | Walid Dalloul (QAT) | 59.54 | |
| 34 | 1 | Erdenebilegiin Byambasüren (MGL) | 1:00.08 | |
| 35 | 1 | Nishwan Ibrahim (MDV) | 1:00.14 | |
| 36 | 1 | Miraj Prajapati (NEP) | 1:01.91 | |
| 37 | 1 | Phathana Inthavong (LAO) | 1:02.46 | |
| 38 | 1 | Mohamed Muthasim Adnan (MDV) | 1:03.87 | |
| 39 | 1 | Radzhabmurod Kasymov (TJK) | 1:08.52 | |
| — | 3 | Sooud Al-Tayyar (KUW) | DNS | |

=== Final ===
| Rank | Athlete | Time | Notes |
|---|---|---|---|
| 1st place, gold medalist(s) | Ning Zetao (CHN) | 47.70 | AR |
| 2nd place, silver medalist(s) | Shinri Shioura (JPN) | 48.85 | |
| 3rd place, bronze medalist(s) | Rammaru Harada (JPN) | 49.47 | |
| 4 | Yu Hexin (CHN) | 49.50 | |
| 5 | Hoàng Quý Phước (VIE) | 50.15 | |
| 6 | Geoffrey Cheah (HKG) | 50.41 | |
| 7 | Clement Lim (SIN) | 50.61 | |
| DQ | Park Tae-hwan (KOR) | ~~48.75~~ | |

- Park Tae-hwan of South Korea originally won the silver medal, but was later disqualified after he tested positive for Nebido.
