= Swimming at the 2014 Asian Games – Men's 4 × 100 metre freestyle relay =

Men's 4 × 100 metre freestyle relay at the 2014 Asian Games
- Venue: Munhak Park Tae-hwan Aquatics Center
- Date: 24 September 2014
- Competitors: 60 from 14 nations

Medalists
gold medal	China; Yu Hexin, Lin Yongqing, Sun Yang, Ning Zetao, Hao Yun, Xu Qiheng, Liu Junwu
silver medal	Japan; Shinri Shioura, Rammaru Harada, Takuro Fujii, Katsumi Nakamura, Kenta Ito
bronze medal	Hong Kong; Geoffrey Cheah, Jeremy Wong, Derick Ng, Kent Cheung, Raymond Mak, David Wong

The men's 4 × 100 metre freestyle relay event at the 2014 Asian Games took place on 24 September 2014 at Munhak Park Tae-hwan Aquatics Center, South Korea.

== Schedule ==
All times are Korea Standard Time (UTC+09:00)

Date	Time	Event
Wednesday, 24 September 2014	09:00	Heats
Wednesday, 24 September 2014	20:32	Final

== Records ==
Prior to this competition, the existing world, Asian and Games records were as follows.

World Record	United States	3:08.24	Beijing, China	11 August 2008
Asian Record	Japan	3:14.73	Hong Kong	8 December 2009
Games Record	China	3:16.34	Guangzhou, China	16 November 2010

== Results ==
Legend

- DNS — Did not start
- DSQ — Disqualified

=== Heats ===
Rank	Heat	Team	Time	Notes
1	2	Japan (JPN)	3:17.41	
		Shinri Shioura	49.29	
		Rammaru Harada	49.87	
		Kenta Ito	48.45	
		Katsumi Nakamura	49.80	
2	1	China (CHN)	3:19.73	
		Hao Yun	50.20	
		Xu Qiheng	49.95	
		Lin Yongqing	49.27	
		Liu Junwu	50.31	
3	2	South Korea (KOR)	3:21.64	
		Yang June-hyuck	50.83	
		Park Seon-kwan	49.99	
		Nam Ki-woong	50.26	
		Kim Sung-kyum	50.56	
4	2	Hong Kong (HKG)	3:24.04	
		Jeremy Wong	51.03	
		Kent Cheung	50.55	
		Raymond Mak	51.38	
		David Wong	51.08	
5	1	Chinese Taipei (TPE)	3:25.85	
		Huang Yen-hsin	51.63	
		Chang Kuo-chi	51.50	
		Lin Chien-liang	52.40	
		Wang Yu-lian	50.32	
6	1	Uzbekistan (UZB)	3:26.22	
		Daniil Tulupov	51.64	
		Daniil Bukin	52.89	
		Islam Aslanov	51.32	
		Khurshidjon Tursunov	50.37	
7	2	India (IND)	3:27.87	
		Anshul Kothari	52.12	
		Sajan Prakash	51.69	
		Neil Contractor	51.92	
		Aaron D'Souza	52.14	
8	1	Indonesia (INA)	3:28.32	
		Triady Fauzi Sidiq	51.13	
		Alexis Wijaya Ohmar	52.34	
		I Gede Siman Sudartawa	52.31	
		Ricky Anggawijaya	52.54	
9	1	Iran (IRI)	3:29.65	
		Mehdi Ansari	52.95	
		Arsham Mirzaei	52.41	
		Jamal Chavoshifar	51.69	
		Ahmad Reza Jalali	52.60	
10	1	Macau (MAC)	3:33.46	
		Ngou Pok Man	52.05	
		Chao Man Hou	52.72	
		Chou Kit	55.01	
		Lao Kuan Fong	53.68	
11	1	Mongolia (MGL)	3:55.67	
		Batsaikhany Dölgöön	56.34	
		Baasandorjiin Amarbold	1:02.08	
		Erdenebilegiin Byambasüren	1:01.41	
		Myagmaryn Delgerkhüü	55.84	
12	2	Maldives (MDV)	4:17.81	
		Nishwan Ibrahim	59.72	
		Mohamed Muthasim Adnan	1:02.42	
		Mubal Azzam Ibrahim	1:09.53	
		Ismail Muthasim Adnan	1:06.14	
—	2	Singapore (SIN)	DSQ	
		Clement Lim	50.99	
		Danny Yeo	51.24	
		Darren Lim		
		Rainer Ng		
—	2	Pakistan (PAK)	DNS	
		—		
		—		
		—		
		—		

=== Final ===
Rank	Team	Time	Notes
1st place, gold medalist(s)	China (CHN)	3:13.47	AR
	Yu Hexin	49.40	
	Lin Yongqing	48.44	
	Sun Yang	48.55	
	Ning Zetao	47.08	
2nd place, silver medalist(s)	Japan (JPN)	3:14.38	
	Shinri Shioura	49.03	
	Rammaru Harada	48.49	
	Takuro Fujii	48.92	
	Katsumi Nakamura	47.94	
3rd place, bronze medalist(s)	Hong Kong (HKG)	3:22.45	
	Geoffrey Cheah	50.26	
	Jeremy Wong	50.38	
	Derick Ng	50.91	
	Kent Cheung	50.90	
4	Chinese Taipei (TPE)	3:23.89	
	Chang Kuo-chi	51.60	
	Huang Yen-hsin	51.01	
	Lin Chien-liang	51.58	
	Wang Yu-lian	49.70	
5	Uzbekistan (UZB)	3:23.95	
	Daniil Tulupov	51.22	
	Aleksey Derlyugov	51.21	
	Islam Aslanov	51.85	
	Khurshidjon Tursunov	49.67	
6	India (IND)	3:25.94	
	Anshul Kothari	52.40	
	Sajan Prakash	51.50	
	Neil Contractor	52.03	
	Aaron D'Souza	50.01	
7	Indonesia (INA)	3:27.54	
	Triady Fauzi Sidiq	51.32	
	Alexis Wijaya Ohmar	51.50	
	I Gede Siman Sudartawa	51.29	
	Ricky Anggawijaya	53.43	
DQ	South Korea (KOR)	~~3:18.44~~	
	Kim Sung-kyum	50.58	
	Yang June-hyuck	50.29	
	Nam Ki-woong	48.93	
	Park Tae-hwan	48.64	

- South Korea originally won the bronze medal, but was later disqualified after Park Tae-hwan tested positive for Nebido.
