= Swimming at the 2014 Asian Games – Men's 100 metre butterfly =

Event at the 2014 Asian Games

Men's 100 metre butterfly at the 2014 Asian Games
- Venue: Munhak Park Tae-hwan Aquatics Center
- Date: 24 September 2014
- Competitors: 24 from 18 nations

Medalists
gold medal	Joseph Schooling	Singapore
silver medal	Li Zhuhao	China
bronze medal	Hirofumi Ikebata	Japan

The men's 100 metre butterfly event at the 2014 Asian Games took place on 24 September 2014 at Munhak Park Tae-hwan Aquatics Center.

== Schedule ==
All times are Korea Standard Time (UTC+09:00)

Date	Time	Event
Wednesday, 24 September 2014	09:00	Heats
Wednesday, 24 September 2014	19:00	Final

== Records ==
Prior to this competition, the existing world, Asian and Games records were as follows.

World Record	Michael Phelps (USA)	49.82	Rome, Italy	1 August 2009
Asian Record	Kohei Kawamoto (JPN)	51.00	Niigata, Japan	11 September 2009
Games Record	Zhou Jiawei (CHN)	51.83	Guangzhou, China	14 November 2010

== Results ==
Legend

- DNS — Did not start

=== Heats ===
Rank	Heat	Athlete	Time	Notes
1	2	Takuro Fujii (JPN)	52.83	
1	3	Joseph Schooling (SIN)	52.83	
3	2	Li Zhuhao (CHN)	52.98	
4	2	Zhang Qibin (CHN)	53.24	
5	1	Hirofumi Ikebata (JPN)	53.34	
6	3	Chang Gyu-cheol (KOR)	53.44	
7	1	Glenn Victor Sutanto (INA)	53.86	
8	2	Geoffrey Cheah (HKG)	53.97	
9	1	Hoàng Quý Phước (VIE)	54.21	
10	3	Yun Seok-hwan (KOR)	54.24	
11	3	Hsu Chi-chieh (TPE)	54.71	
12	2	Islam Aslanov (UZB)	55.01	
13	1	Jessie Lacuna (PHI)	55.18	
14	1	Derick Ng (HKG)	55.33	
15	3	Aleksey Derlyugov (UZB)	55.47	
16	3	Sajan Prakash (IND)	55.64	
17	3	Rainer Ng (SIN)	56.53	
18	2	Ayman Klzie (SYR)	56.56	
19	1	Mehdi Ansari (IRI)	57.18	
20	2	Anthony Barbar (LIB)	58.15	
21	1	Ali Ashkanani (KUW)	59.62	
22	3	Hassan Al-Mubarak (KSA)	1:02.56	
23	1	Ismail Muthasim Adnan (MDV)	1:13.96	
—	2	Nasir Ali (PAK)	DNS	

=== Final ===
Rank	Athlete	Time	Notes
1st place, gold medalist(s)	Joseph Schooling (SIN)	51.76	GR
2nd place, silver medalist(s)	Li Zhuhao (CHN)	51.91	
3rd place, bronze medalist(s)	Hirofumi Ikebata (JPN)	52.08	
4	Takuro Fujii (JPN)	52.09	
5	Zhang Qibin (CHN)	52.77	
6	Chang Gyu-cheol (KOR)	53.17	
7	Glenn Victor Sutanto (INA)	53.79	
8	Geoffrey Cheah (HKG)	53.86	
