= Swimming at the 2014 Asian Games – Women's 100 metre butterfly =

Women's 100 metre butterfly at the 2014 Asian Games
- Venue: Munhak Park Tae-hwan Aquatics Center
- Date: 23 September 2014
- Competitors: 15 from 10 nations

Medalists
gold medal	Chen Xinyi	China
silver medal	Lu Ying	China
bronze medal	Tao Li	Singapore

The women's 100 metre butterfly event at the 2014 Asian Games took place on 23 September 2014 at Munhak Park Tae-hwan Aquatics Center.

== Schedule ==
All times are Korea Standard Time (UTC+09:00)

Date	Time	Event
Tuesday, 23 September 2014	09:00	Heats
Tuesday, 23 September 2014	20:00	Final

== Records ==
Prior to this competition, the existing world, Asian and Games records were as follows.

World Record	Dana Vollmer (USA)	55.98	London, United Kingdom	29 July 2012
Asian Record	Liu Zige (CHN)	56.07	Jinan, China	18 October 2009
Games Record	Jiao Liuyang (CHN)	57.76	Guangzhou, China	13 November 2010

== Results ==
Legend

- DNS — Did not start

=== Heats ===
Rank	Heat	Athlete	Time	Notes
1	1	Chen Xinyi (CHN)	58.56	
2	1	Natsumi Hoshi (JPN)	59.60	
3	2	Miyu Nakano (JPN)	59.73	
4	2	An Se-hyeon (KOR)	1:00.16	
5	2	Lu Ying (CHN)	1:00.45	
6	1	Elmira Aigaliyeva (KAZ)	1:00.96	
7	2	Tao Li (SIN)	1:01.71	
8	1	Chan Kin Lok (HKG)	1:01.88	
9	1	Jasmine Al-Khaldi (PHI)	1:02.34	
10	2	Marina Chan (SIN)	1:02.86	
11	2	Patarawadee Kittiya (THA)	1:04.08	
12	2	Sutasinee Pankaew (THA)	1:04.26	
13	1	Sze Hang Yu (HKG)	1:05.72	
14	1	Ma Cheok Mei (MAC)	1:09.78	
—	2	Soha Sanjrani (PAK)	DNS	

=== Final ===
Rank	Athlete	Time	Notes
1st place, gold medalist(s)	Chen Xinyi (CHN)	56.61	GR
2nd place, silver medalist(s)	Lu Ying (CHN)	58.45	
3rd place, bronze medalist(s)	Tao Li (SIN)	59.08	
4	Natsumi Hoshi (JPN)	59.21	
5	An Se-hyeon (KOR)	59.22	
6	Miyu Nakano (JPN)	59.48	
7	Elmira Aigaliyeva (KAZ)	1:00.87	
8	Chan Kin Lok (HKG)	1:01.83	
