= Dmitriy Balandin =

Kazakhstani swimmer (born 1995)

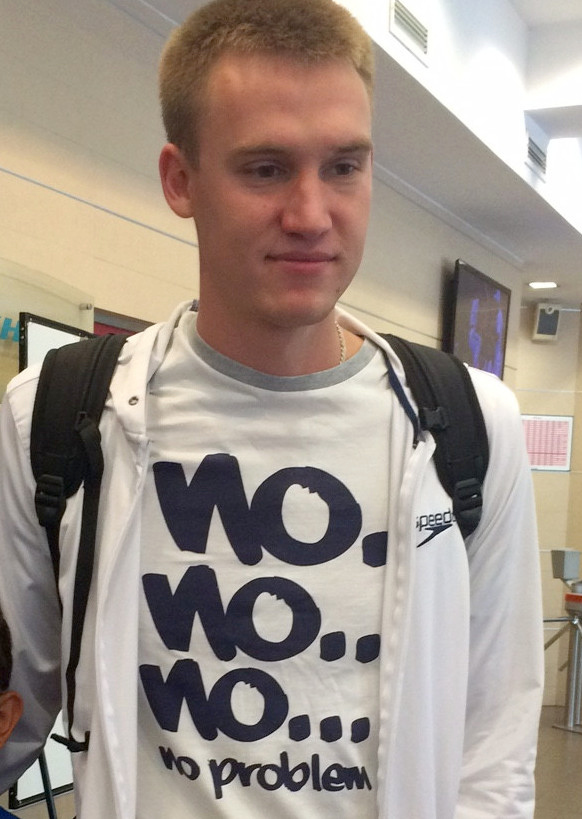
- Balandin in 2016

Personal information
- Full name: Dmitriy Igorevich Balandin
- National team: Kazakhstan
- Born: 4 April 1995 (age 31) Almaty, Kazakhstan
- Height: 1.95 m (6 ft 5 in)
- Weight: 85 kg (187 lb)

Sport
- Sport: Swimming
- Strokes: Breaststroke
- Coach: Vladimir Rybchenko
Medal record
Men's swimming
Representing Kazakhstan
Event	1st	2nd	3rd
Olympic Games	1	0	0
Asian Games	3	0	3
Summer Universiade	1	1	2
Total	5	1	5
Olympic Games
Gold medal – first place	2016 Rio de Janeiro	200 m breaststroke
Asian Games
Gold medal – first place	2014 Incheon	50 m breaststroke
Gold medal – first place	2014 Incheon	100 m breaststroke
Gold medal – first place	2014 Incheon	200 m breaststroke
Bronze medal – third place	2018 Jakarta	100 m breaststroke
Bronze medal – third place	2018 Jakarta	50 m breaststroke
Bronze medal – third place	2018 Jakarta	4×100 m medley
Summer Universiade
Gold medal – first place	2015 Gwangju	100 m breaststroke
Silver medal – second place	2017 Taipei	200 m breaststroke
Bronze medal – third place	2015 Gwangju	50 m breaststroke
Bronze medal – third place	2017 Taipei	100 m breaststroke

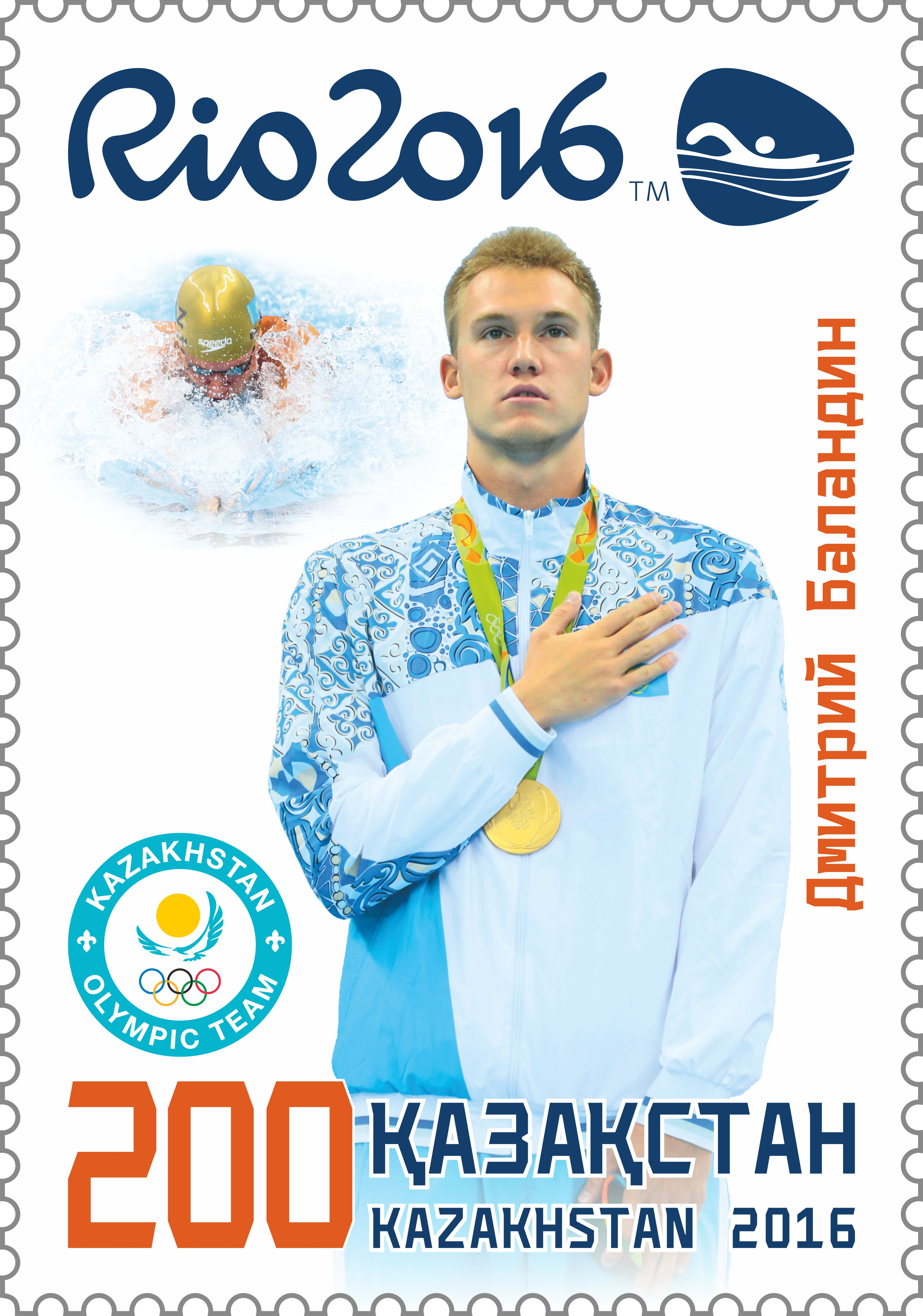
Balandin on a 2016 stamp of Kazakhstan

Dmitriy Igorevich Balandin (Russian: Дмитрий Игоревич Баландин; born 4 April 1995) is a retired Kazakh breaststroke swimmer. He won the 200 m breaststroke at the 2016 Summer Olympics, as well as the 50, 100 and 200 m breaststroke events at the 2014 Asian Games.

== Career ==
Balandin currently holds two Kazakh records in the 100 and 200 m breaststroke, and also set a historic milestone for his nation by striking the breaststroke triple at the 2014 Asian Games in Incheon, South Korea.

In the 2016 Rio Olympics, Balandin won a gold medal in the 200 m breaststroke, setting up new national record with 2:07.46. This was his first Olympic medal, and Kazakhstan's first-ever medal in a swimming event.

Balandin emerged as an unexpected medal contender at the 2014 Asian Games in Incheon, where he competed in all breaststroke events. In the men's 200 m breaststroke, Balandin moved from a top seed in the prelims to stun the entire crowd and crush the twelve-year-old meet record set by Japanese swimmer and four-time Olympic champion Kosuke Kitajima in a time of 2:07.67 for the gold medal, jumping him into third in the world rankings. The following day, in the men's 100 m breaststroke, Balandin threw down a Kazakh record in 59.92 to pick up his second gold of the meet. Additionally, he raced his stretch to overhaul a minute barrier for the first time in Asian Games history. On the final day of swimming, Balandin completed a remarkable meet with another Games record of 27.78 for his third straight gold of the meet in the 50 m breaststroke.

== Recognition ==
In 2016, a new pool was opened and named after Dmitry Balandin at Al-Farabi Kazakh National University in Alma-Ata.

In 2016, Dmitry Balandin was chosen as one of the nominees in the "proposed candidates" category of the national project «El Tulgasy» (Name of the Motherland) The idea of the project was to select the most significant citizens of Kazakhstan whose names are now associated with the achievements of the country. More than 350,000 people voted in this project, and Balandin was voted into 3rd place in his category.

== Personal best times ==
Event	Time	Location	Date	Notes
50 m breaststroke	27.24	Kazan	4 August 2015	
100 m breaststroke	59.38	Kazan	2 August 2015	
200 m breaststroke	2:07.46	Rio de Janeiro	10 August 2016	NR
