= Chao Man Hou =

Macau swimmer (born 1996)

Personal information
- Nationality: Macau
- Born: 21 February 1996 (age 30)

Chinese name
- Traditional Chinese: 周文顥
- Simplified Chinese: 周文颢
- Hanyu Pinyin: Zhōu Wénhào
- Yale Romanization: Jāu Màhn-houh
- Jyutping: Zau1 Man4-hou6

Sport
- Sport: Swimming

Chao Man Hou (born 21 February 1996) is a Macau swimmer. He competed at the 2015 World Aquatics Championships and the 2017 World Aquatics Championships.

He was the flag bearer for Macau at the 2014 Asian Games opening ceremony in Incheon, South Korea.

Chao graduated from the University of Macau in 2018. At the 2018 Asian Games, he set a new Macau record in the qualifiers for men's 200 metre breaststroke, with a time of 2:15.34, coming in 7th place overall. He is nicknamed "the frog king of Macau" (澳門蛙王, "frog style" being the literal translation of the Chinese name for the breaststroke).

== Major Results ==
=== Individual ===
Year	Competition	Venue	Position	Event	Notes
Representing Macau
2012	Asian Championships	Dubai, United Arab Emirates	14th (h)	50 m breaststroke	29.98
2012	Asian Championships	Dubai, United Arab Emirates	14th (h)	100 m breaststroke	1:06.31
2012	Asian Championships	Dubai, United Arab Emirates	13th (h)	200 m breaststroke	2:23.88
2012	Asian Championships	Dubai, United Arab Emirates	15th (h)	200 m medley	2:16.25
2014	Asian Games	Incheon, South Korea	12th (h)	50 m breaststroke	29.25
2014	Asian Games	Incheon, South Korea	18th (h)	100 m breaststroke	1:04.44
2014	Asian Games	Incheon, South Korea	14th (h)	200 m breaststroke	2:19.20
2015	World Championships	Kazan, Russia	47th (h)	50 m breaststroke	28.99
2015	World Championships	Kazan, Russia	49th (h)	100 m breaststroke	1:03.46
2016	Asian Championships	Tokyo, Japan	11th (h)	50 m breaststroke	28.61
2016	Asian Championships	Tokyo, Japan	8th	100 m breaststroke	1:03.32
2016	Asian Championships	Tokyo, Japan	11th (h)	200 m breaststroke	2:18.98
2017	World Championships	Budapest, Hungary	43rd (h)	100 m breaststroke	1:02.49
2017	World Championships	Budapest, Hungary	28th (h)	200 m breaststroke	2:15.41
2017	Universiade	(Chinese Taipei) Taipei, Taiwan	23rd (h)	50 m breaststroke	28.47
2017	Universiade	(Chinese Taipei) Taipei, Taiwan	27th (h)	100 m breaststroke	1:02.48
2017	Universiade	(Chinese Taipei) Taipei, Taiwan	30th (h)	200 m breaststroke	2:17.48
2018	Asian Games	Jakarta, Indonesia	6th	50 m breaststroke	27.91
2018	Asian Games	Jakarta, Indonesia	12th (h)	100 m breaststroke	1:02.23
2018	Asian Games	Jakarta, Indonesia	7th	200 m breaststroke	2:15.82
2019	World Championships	Gwangju, South Korea	36th (h)	50 m breaststroke	28.07
2019	World Championships	Gwangju, South Korea	41st (h)	100 m breaststroke	1:02.14
2023	Asian Games	Hangzhou, China	5th	50 m breaststroke	27.76
2023	Asian Games	Hangzhou, China	6th	100 m breaststroke	1:01.53

=== Relay ===
Year	Competition	Venue	Position	Event	Notes
Representing Macau
2012	Asian Championships	Dubai, United Arab Emirates	6th	4 × 100 m freestyle relay	3:36.80
2012	Asian Championships	Dubai, United Arab Emirates	-	4 × 100 m medley relay	DQ
2014	Asian Games	Incheon, South Korea	10th (h)	4 × 100 m freestyle relay	3:33.46
2014	Asian Games	Incheon, South Korea	7th	4 × 200 m freestyle relay	8:00.83
2014	Asian Games	Incheon, South Korea	9th (h)	4 × 100 m medley relay	3:51.26
2015	World Championships	Kazan, Russia	23rd (h)	Mixed 4 × 100 m freestyle relay	3:48.80
2015	World Championships	Kazan, Russia	21st (h)	Mixed 4 × 100 m medley relay	4.16.02
2016	Asian Championships	Tokyo, Japan	10th (h)	4 × 100 m freestyle relay	3:37.10
2016	Asian Championships	Tokyo, Japan	10th (h)	4 × 100 m medley relay	4:01.18
2017	World Championships	Budapest, Hungary	16th (h)	Mixed 4 × 100 m freestyle relay	3:43.49
2018	Asian Games	Jakarta, Indonesia	12th (h)	4 × 100 m freestyle relay	3:29.97
2018	Asian Games	Jakarta, Indonesia	9th (h)	4 × 200 m freestyle relay	7:51.00
2018	Asian Games	Jakarta, Indonesia	13th (h)	4 × 100 m medley relay	3:50.22
2018	Asian Games	Jakarta, Indonesia	9th (h)	Mixed 4 × 100 m medley relay	4:07.29

Sporting positions
Preceded by Au Ieong Sin Ieng	Flagbearer for Macau at the Asian Games; Incheon 2014	Succeeded by Sio Ka Kun
