= Yekaterina Rudenko =

Kazakhstani swimmer (born 1994)

Personal information
- Full name: Yekaterina Olegovna Rudenko
- National team: Kazakhstan
- Born: 16 October 1994 (age 31) Aqmola, Kazakhstan
- Height: 1.77 m (5 ft 10 in)
- Weight: 53 kg (117 lb)

Sport
- Sport: Swimming
- Strokes: Backstroke
- College team: Drury University (U.S.)
- Coach: Natalia Dolgikh; Natalia Shpileva
Medal record
Women's swimming
Representing Kazakhstan
Asian Games
Silver medal – second place	2014 Incheon	50 m backstroke
Silver medal – second place	2014 Incheon	100 m backstroke

Yekaterina Olegovna Rudenko (Kazakh: Екатерина Олеговна Руденко; born October 16, 1994) is a Kazakh swimmer, who specialized in backstroke events. She represented her nation Kazakhstan in two editions of the Olympic Games (2008 and 2012), finished fifth in the girls' 50 m backstroke at the 2010 Summer Youth Olympics in Singapore, and later captured two silver medals in the 50 and 100 m backstroke at the 2014 Asian Games in Incheon.

Rudenko became the youngest ever swimmer (aged 13) to compete for the Kazakh team at the 2008 Summer Olympics in Beijing, swimming in the 100 m backstroke. She cruised to the top of the field with a 1:03.84 to invincibly slide under the FINA B-cut (1:03.86) by two hundredths of a second (0.02) at the Kazakhstan Open Championships three months earlier in Almaty. Inexperienced to the Olympic scene, Rudenko rounded out the field to last place and forty-fifth overall in heat two with a 1:04.85.

At the 2012 Summer Olympics, Rudenko competed for the second time in the women's 100 m backstroke, by downing her FINA B-cut to 1:02.60 at the Kazakhstan Open. Rudenko touched behind the leader Tao Li of Singapore on the initial length in heat two, before fading down the stretch to save the seventh spot in 1:03.64, missing the semifinals with a much improved, thirty-eighth overall placement in the prelims.

Two years later, at the 2014 Asian Games in Incheon, Rudenko upgraded her standards with a striking silver medal double in the women's 50 and 100 m backstroke, blistering a lifetime best of 28.04 (50 m backstroke) and 1:00.61 (100 m backstroke), respectively.

Rudenko is currently training for the Drury Panthers women's swimming and diving team under head coach Brian Reynolds, while taking up undergraduate studies at Drury University in Springfield, Missouri.
