= Vladislav Mustafin =

Uzbekistani swimmer (born 1995)

Personal information
- Native name: Владислав Мустафин
- Nationality: Uzbekistani
- Born: 26 September 1995 (age 30) Tashkent, Uzbekistan

Sport
- Sport: Swimming
Medal record
Men's swimming
Representing Uzbekistan
Asian Games
Bronze medal – third place	2014 Incheon	4×100 m medley
Islamic Solidarity Games
Gold medal – first place	2021 Konya	4×100 m medley

Vladislav Mustafin (Владислав Мустафин, born 26 September 1995) is an Uzbekistani swimmer. He competed in the men's 100 metre breaststroke event at the 2016 Summer Olympics.

== Major results ==
=== Individual ===
Year	Competition	Venue	Position	Event	Notes
Representing Uzbekistan
2013	World Championships	Barcelona, Spain	49th (h)	50 m breaststroke	28.97
2013	World Championships	Barcelona, Spain	51st (h)	100 m breaststroke	1:03.76
2014	Asian Games	Incheon, South Korea	17th (h)	50 m butterfly	25.95
2014	Asian Games	Incheon, South Korea	4th	50 m breaststroke	28.57
2014	Asian Games	Incheon, South Korea	7th	100 m breaststroke	1:02.24
2014	Asian Games	Incheon, South Korea	8th	200 m breaststroke	2:14.97
2015	World Championships	Kazan, Russia	16th (sf)	50 m breaststroke	27.79
2015	World Championships	Kazan, Russia	20th (h)	100 m breaststroke	1:00.63
2015	World Championships	Kazan, Russia	30th (h)	200 m breaststroke	2:14.31
2016	Olympic Games	Rio de Janeiro, Brazil	34th (h)	100 m breaststroke	1:01.66
2016	Asian Championships	Tokyo, Japan	6th	50 m breaststroke	28.31
2016	Asian Championships	Tokyo, Japan	-	100 m breaststroke	DQ
2018	Asian Games	Jakarta, Indonesia	5th	50 m breaststroke	27.72
2018	Asian Games	Jakarta, Indonesia	7th	100 m breaststroke	1:01.49
2018	Asian Games	Jakarta, Indonesia	16th (h)	200 m breaststroke	2:19.02
2019	World Championships	Gwangju, South Korea	32nd (h)	50 m breaststroke	27.90
2019	World Championships	Gwangju, South Korea	20th (h)	100 m breaststroke	1:02.48

=== Relay ===
Year	Competition	Venue	Position	Event	Notes
Representing Uzbekistan
2014	Asian Games	Incheon, South Korea	3rd	4 × 100 m medley relay	3:43.54 *
2015	World Championships	Kazan, Russia	22nd (h)	4 × 100 m medley relay	3:42.33
2016	Asian Championships	Tokyo, Japan	7th	4 × 100 m freestyle relay	3:30.09 **
2016	Asian Championships	Tokyo, Japan	4th	4 × 100 m medley relay	3:46.12
2018	Asian Games	Jakarta, Indonesia	11th (h)	4 × 100 m freestyle relay	3:27.15
2018	Asian Games	Jakarta, Indonesia	10th (h)	4 × 100 m medley relay	3:45.64

- South Korea originally won the bronze medal, but was later disqualified after Park Tae-hwan tested positive for Nebido.
- In heat (he didn't participated in the final)
