= Kazuki Kohinata =

Japanese swimmer (born 1994)

Personal information
- Nationality: Japanese
- Born: 12 October 1994 (age 31) Tokyo, Japan

Sport
- Sport: Swimming
- Strokes: Breaststroke
Medal record
Men's swimming
Representing Japan
Asian Games
Silver medal – second place	2014 Incheon	200 m breaststroke
Asian Championships
Gold medal – first place	2012 Dubai	100 m breaststroke
Gold medal – first place	2012 Dubai	200 m breaststroke
Universiade
Silver medal – second place	2015 Gwangju	200 m breaststroke
Bronze medal – third place	2015 Gwangju	4×100 m medley
Junior Pan Pacific Championships
Silver medal – second place	2012 Honolulu	100 m breaststroke
Silver medal – second place	2012 Honolulu	200 m breaststroke

Kazuki Kohinata (小日向 一輝, Kohinata Kazuki; born 12 October 1994) is a Japanese swimmer. He competed in the men's 200 metre breaststroke at the 2019 World Aquatics Championships.
