= Yang Zhixian =

Chinese swimmer

Personal information
- Full name: Yang Zhixian
- National team: China
- Born: Hunan, China

Sport
- Sport: Swimming
- Strokes: Backstroke, medley
Medal record
Representing China
Asian Games
Silver medal – second place	2014 Incheon	400 m individual medley

Yang Zhixian is a Chinese competitive swimmer who specializes in the men's 400-metre individual medley.

== Early career ==
Yang is from Hunan province and emerged as a competitive swimmer specializing in medley and backstroke events. He qualified for international competition as a member of the Chinese national swimming team.

== Olympic career ==
Yang represented China at the 2012 Summer Olympics in London. He competed in the men's 400 metre individual medley, where he finished 12th overall in the heats and did not advance to the final.

== Asian Games ==
Yang competed at the 2014 Asian Games in Incheon, South Korea. He won a silver medal in the men's 400 metre individual medley, contributing to China’s medal tally in swimming.
