= Li Zhuhao =

Chinese swimmer (born 1999)

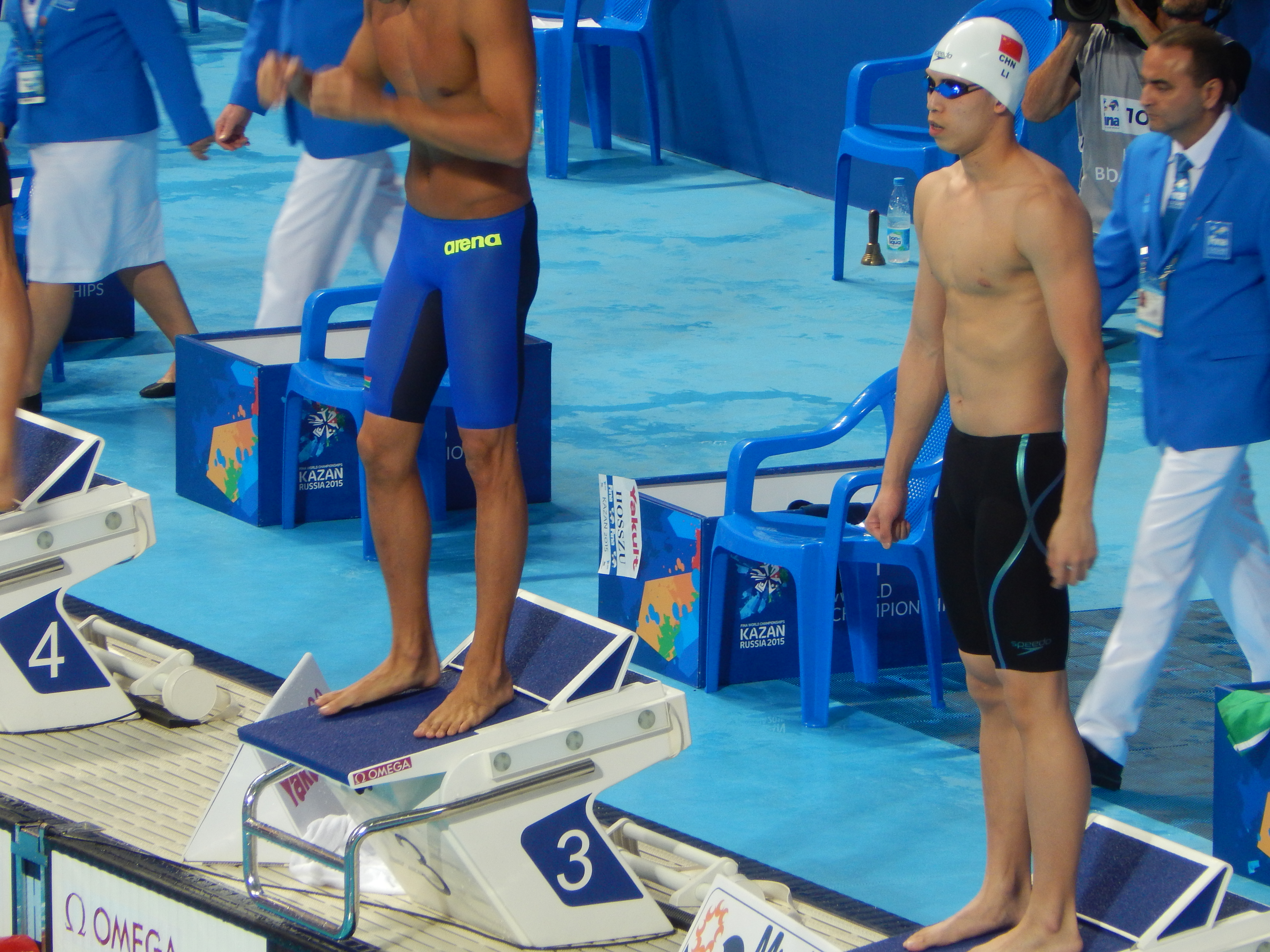
- Li at Kazan 2015

Personal information
- Full name: Li Zhuhao 李朱濠
- Nationality: China
- Born: January 9, 1999 (age 27) Wenzhou, Zhejiang, China
- Height: 1.83 m (6 ft 0 in)
- Weight: 73 kg (161 lb)

Sport
- Sport: Swimming
- Strokes: Butterfly
- Club: Zhejiang
Medal record
Men's swimming
Representing China
World Championships (LC)
Bronze medal – third place	2017 Budapest	4×100 m mixed medley
World Championships (SC)
Bronze medal – third place	2018 Hangzhou	100 m butterfly
Bronze medal – third place	2018 Hangzhou	200 m butterfly
Asian Games
Gold medal – first place	2014 Incheon	4×100 m medley
Gold medal – first place	2018 Jakarta	4×100 m medley
Silver medal – second place	2014 Incheon	100 m butterfly
Silver medal – second place	2018 Jakarta	100 m butterfly
Bronze medal – third place	2018 Jakarta	200 m butterfly

Li Zhuhao (born January 9, 1999) is a Chinese competitive swimmer, specializing in butterfly. At the 2014 Asian Games, he won the silver medal in the 100 metre butterfly and the gold medal in the 4 × 100 m medley relay, setting the Asian Games record.

In August 2015, Li competed in the World Championships in Kazan, Russia. In the semifinals of the 100 meter butterfly he broke the junior world record with a time of 51.33. He finished 8th in the final. A month later in Huangshan, Li broke the junior world record in the 200 meter butterfly (again in long course) with a time of 1:55.52.

On August 13, Li finished 5th in the finals of the 100 m butterfly at the Olympic Games in Rio.

== Personal bests (long course) ==
As of July 30, 2021

Event	Time	Meet	Date	Note(s)
50 m freestyle	22.85	2015 World Cup	September 30, 2015	
100 m freestyle	51.95	2019 World Cup	August 9, 2019	
400 m freestyle	3:50.10	1st Youth Swimming Championships	October 19, 2015	
50 m butterfly	23.36	Chinese National Championships	April 11, 2017	NR
100 m butterfly	50.96	2017 World Aquatics Championships	July 29, 2017	NR
200 m butterfly	1:55.09	Chinese National Championships	April 13, 2017	
