= Yasuhiro Koseki =

Japanese swimmer (born 1992)

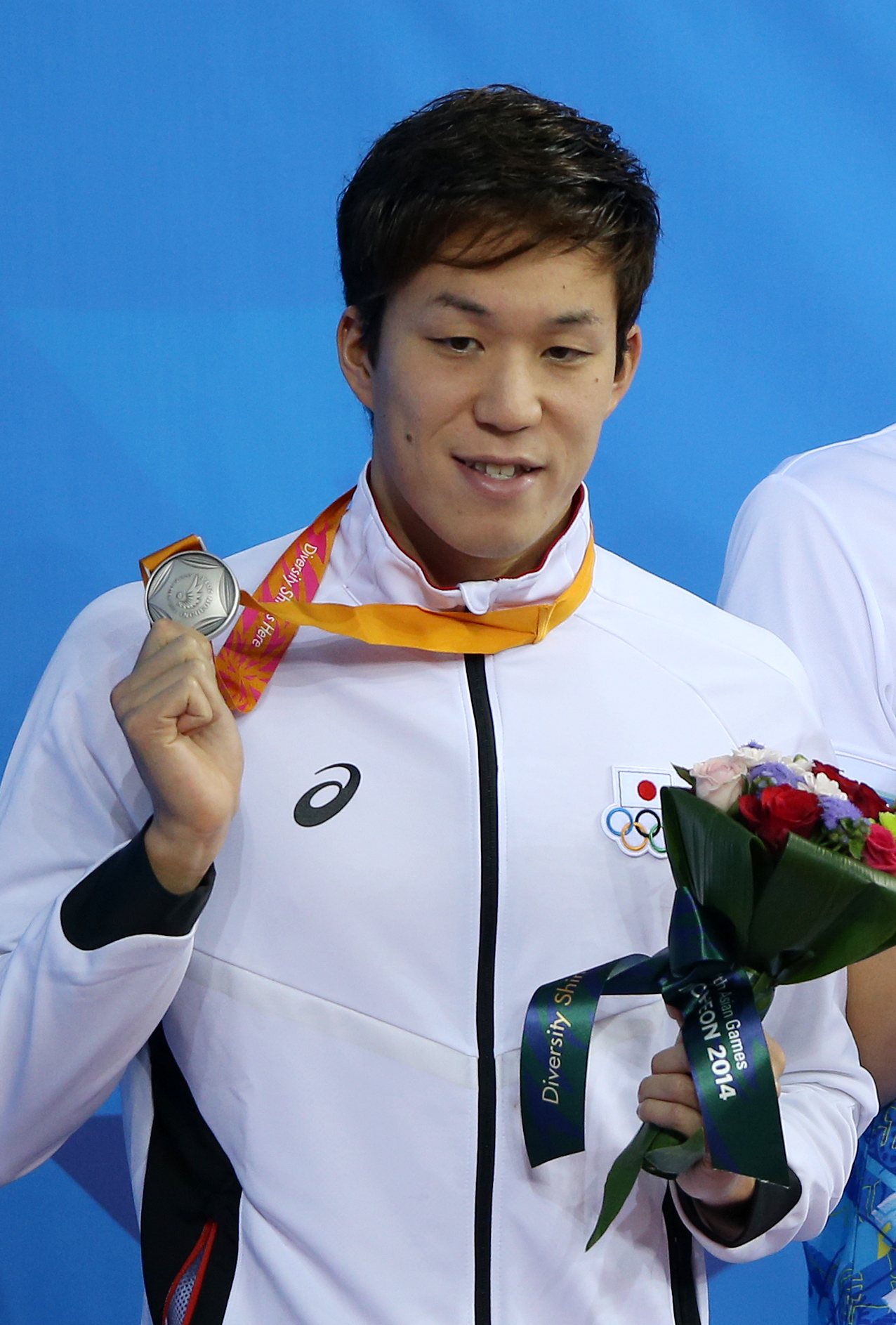

Personal information
- Full name: Yasuhiro Koseki
- National team: Japan
- Born: March 14, 1992 (age 34) Tsuruoka, Yamagata, Japan
- Height: 1.86 m (6 ft 1 in)
- Weight: 82 kg (181 lb)

Sport
- Sport: Swimming
- Strokes: Breaststroke
- Club: Miki House
Medal record
Men's swimming
Representing Japan
World Championships
Silver medal – second place	2017 Budapest	200 m breaststroke
World Championships (SC)
Bronze medal – third place	2018 Hangzhou	100 m breaststroke
Bronze medal – third place	2018 Hangzhou	4×100 m medley
Pan Pacific Championships
Gold medal – first place	2014 Gold Coast	100 m breaststroke
Gold medal – first place	2014 Gold Coast	200 m breaststroke
Gold medal – first place	2018 Tokyo	100 m breaststroke
Silver medal – second place	2014 Gold Coast	4×100 m medley
Silver medal – second place	2018 Tokyo	4×100 m medley
Silver medal – second place	2018 Tokyo	4×100 m mixed medley
Asian Games
Gold medal – first place	2018 Jakarta	50 m breaststroke
Gold medal – first place	2018 Jakarta	100 m breaststroke
Gold medal – first place	2018 Jakarta	200 m breaststroke
Silver medal – second place	2014 Incheon	50 m breaststroke
Silver medal – second place	2014 Incheon	100 m breaststroke
Silver medal – second place	2014 Incheon	4×100 m medley
Silver medal – second place	2018 Jakarta	4×100 m medley
Silver medal – second place	2018 Jakarta	4×100 m mixed medley
Bronze medal – third place	2014 Incheon	200 m breaststroke
Universiade
Gold medal – first place	2013 Kazan	100 m breaststroke
Silver medal – second place	2013 Kazan	4×100 m medley
East Asian Games
Gold medal – first place	2013 Tianjin	100 m breaststroke
Gold medal – first place	2013 Tianjin	4×100 m medley

Yasuhiro Koseki (小関也朱篤, Koseki Yasuhiro; born March 14, 1992) is a Japanese competitive swimmer and breaststroke specialist. He won the 100-meter event at the 2013 Summer Universiade, 2013 East Asian Games, and the 2014 Pan Pacific Swimming Championships. He hold the Asian record in this event, set in February 2014.

Since 2010 Koseki studied at the Nippon Sport Science University, where he first specialized in the freestyle, and only later changed to breaststroke, motivated by Kosuke Kitajima.
