= Zhang Qibin (swimmer) =

Chinese swimmer (born 1994)

Personal information
- Native name: 张麒斌
- Nationality: Chinese
- Born: June 23, 1994 (age 32) Zibo, Shandong
- Height: 1.85 m (6 ft 1 in)
- Weight: 85 kg (187 lb)

Sport
- Country: China
- Sport: Swimming

Zhang Qibin (Chinese: 张麒斌; pinyin: Zhāng Qí Bīn; born 23 June 1994 in Zibo, Shandong) is a Chinese male swimmer. In the 2016 Olympics, Zhang swam the 100 m butterfly, placing 27th in the final with a time of 52.84 seconds.
