= Chen Xinyi =

Chinese swimmer (born 1998)

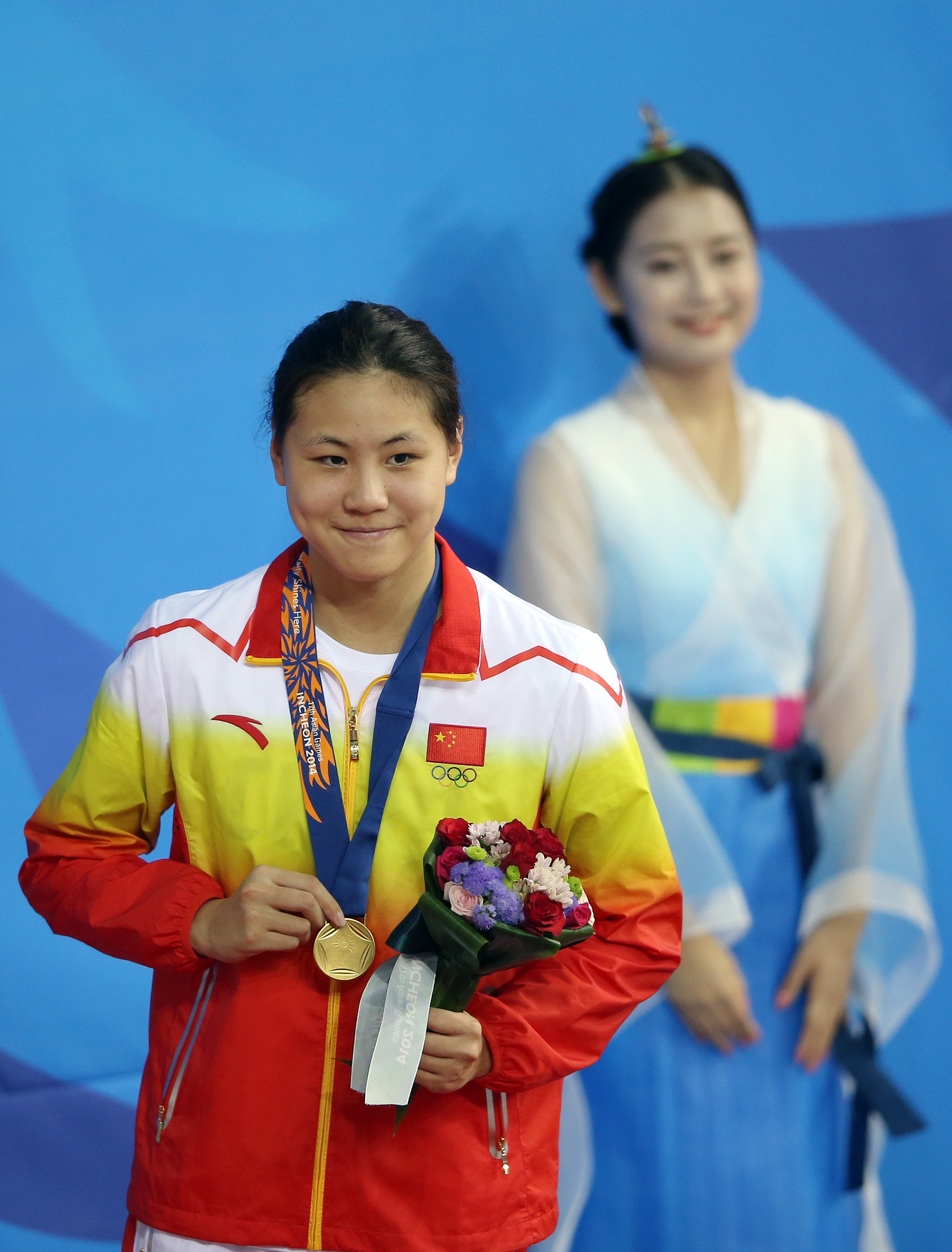

Personal information
- Full name: Chen Xinyi 陈欣怡
- Nationality: China
- Born: January 2, 1998 (age 28) Shanghai, China
- Height: 1.78 m (5 ft 10 in)
- Weight: 132 lb (60 kg)

Sport
- Sport: Swimming
- Strokes: freestyle, butterfly, individual medley
- Club: Shanghai
Medal record
Women's swimming
International aquatics competitions
| Event | 1st | 2nd | 3rd |
|---|---|---|---|
| World Championships (LC) | 1 | 0 | 0 |
| Asian Games | 3 | 0 | 0 |
| Total | 4 | 0 | 0 |
Women's swimming
World Championships (LC)
| Gold medal – first place | 2015 Kazan | 4×100 m medley |
Asian Games
| Gold medal – first place | 2014 Incheon | 50 m freestyle |
| Gold medal – first place | 2014 Incheon | 100 m butterfly |
| Gold medal – first place | 2014 Incheon | 4×100 m freestyle |

Chen Xinyi (born January 2, 1998) is a Chinese competitive swimmer, swimming freestyle, butterfly and individual medley.

== Career ==
At the 2014 Asian Games, she won gold medals in the 50 metre freestyle, 100 metre butterfly and 4 × 100 m freestyle relay.

=== Failed doping test ===
While swimming for the Chinese national team at the 2016 Summer Olympics, Xinyi tested positive for hydrochlorothiazide, a banned substance. Following this, she was suspended from competition in the 2016 Summer Olympics by the Court of Arbitration for Sport. The International Swimming Federation Doping Panel decided to impose on her a period of two years’ ineligibility, from August 11, 2016 to August 10, 2018 for her first anti-doping rule violation.

== Personal bests (long course) ==
As of September 30, 2014

| Event | Time | Meet | Date | Note(s) |
|---|---|---|---|---|
| 50 m freestyle | 24.53 | 2016 National Championship Games of China | April 10, 2016 | |
| 100 m freestyle | 53.84 | 2013 National Games of China | September 9, 2013 | |
| 100 m butterfly | 56.61 | 2014 Asian Games | September 23, 2014 | |
| 200 m individual medley | 2.09.55 | 2013 National Games of China | September 7, 2013 | |
| 400 m individual medley | 4.39.54 | 2013 World Aquatics Championships | August 4, 2013 | |
