= Li Yunqi =

Chinese swimmer (born 1993)

Medal record

Men's swimming

Representing China

Olympic Games
Bronze medal – third place	2012 London	4×200 m freestyle

World Championships (LC)
Bronze medal – third place	2013 Barcelona	4×200 m freestyle

Li Yunqi (Chinese: 李昀琦; pinyin: Lǐ Yúnqí; born August 28, 1993) is a Chinese swimmer. He competed at the 2012 Summer Olympics in the Men's 200 metre freestyle, finishing in 23rd place in the heats, failing to qualify for the semifinals.

== See also ==
- China at the 2012 Summer Olympics - Swimming
