= Aria Nasimi Shad =

Iranian swimmer (born 1995)

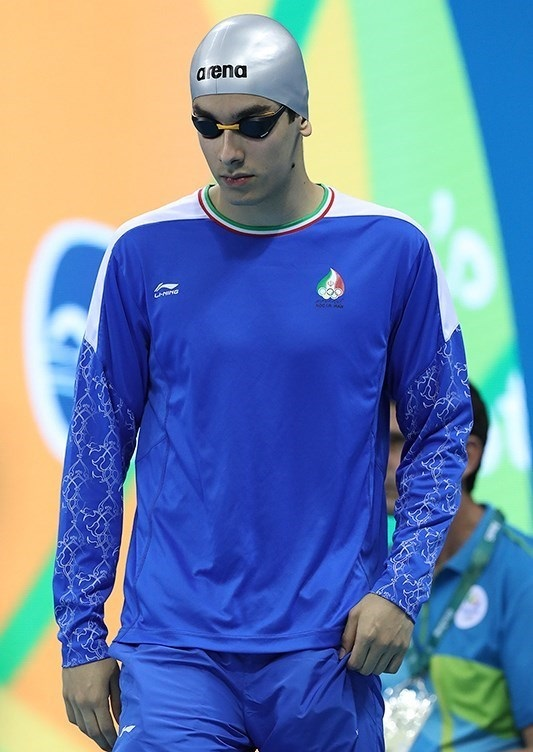
- Nasimi-Shad at the 2016 Summer Olympics

Personal information
- Full name: Aria Nasimi Shad
- Nationality: Iran
- Born: January 7, 1994 (age 32)
- Height: 1.78 m (5 ft 10 in)
- Weight: 67 kg (148 lb; 10.6 st)

Sport
- Sport: Swimming
Medal record
Representing Iran
Men's swimming
Islamic Solidarity Games
Bronze medal – third place	2017 Baku	Medley relay

Aria Nasimi Shad (Persian: آریا نسیمی‌شاد; born 7 November 1999 in Mashhad) is an Iranian swimmer. Nasimi-Shad competed in 2016 Summer Olympics – Men's 200 metre breaststroke.
