= Geoffrey Cheah =

Hong Kong swimmer (born 1990)

Personal information
- Nationality: Hong Konger
- Born: 10 November 1990 (age 35) London, United Kingdom
- Height: 1.85 m (6 ft 1 in)

Chinese name
- Traditional Chinese: 謝旻樹
- Simplified Chinese: 谢旻树
- Hanyu Pinyin: Xiè Mínshù
- Yale Romanization: Jeh Màhnsyuh
- Jyutping: Ze6 Man4-syu6

Sport
- Sport: Swimming
- College team: Stanford University
Medal record
Men's swimming
Representing Hong Kong
Asian Championships
Bronze medal – third place	2006 Singapore	4×100 m freestyle
Bronze medal – third place	2012 Dubai	4×100 m freestyle
Bronze medal – third place	2012 Dubai	4×200 m freestyle
Bronze medal – third place	2012 Dubai	4×100 m medley
Asian Games
Bronze medal – third place	2014 Incheon	4×100 m freestyle

Geoffrey Robin Cheah (Chinese: 謝旻樹; born 10 November 1990) is a Hong Kong competitive swimmer.

He qualified to the 2016 Summer Olympics in Rio de Janeiro, and was selected to represent Hong Kong in the men's 50 metre freestyle.

== Early life ==
Cheah was born in the United Kingdom. His father is Taiwanese, while his mother is Malaysian. He attended West Island School in Hong Kong. While a student, he competed at British Swimming's Age Group Championships in 2005, where he won gold medals in the 100 metres backstroke and 200 metres backstroke and a silver in the 100 metres freestyle. He broke Hong Kong age group and junior records in all three events. He graduated from Stanford University in 2013 with a degree in earth systems.
