= Lin Yongqing =

Chinese swimmer (born 1992)

Personal information
- Native name: 林 永庆
- Nationality: Chinese
- Born: 24 December 1992 (age 33) Liaoyang, Liaoning, China

Sport
- Sport: Swimming
Medal record
Representing China
Asian Games
Gold medal – first place	2014 Incheon	4x100m freestyle relay
Silver medal – second place	2014 Incheon	4x200m freestyle relay

Lin Yongqing (Chinese: 林 永庆, born 24 December 1992) is a Chinese swimmer. He competed in the men's 4 × 100 metre freestyle relay event at the 2016 Summer Olympics.
