= Lee Hsuan-yen =

Taiwanese swimmer (born 1993)

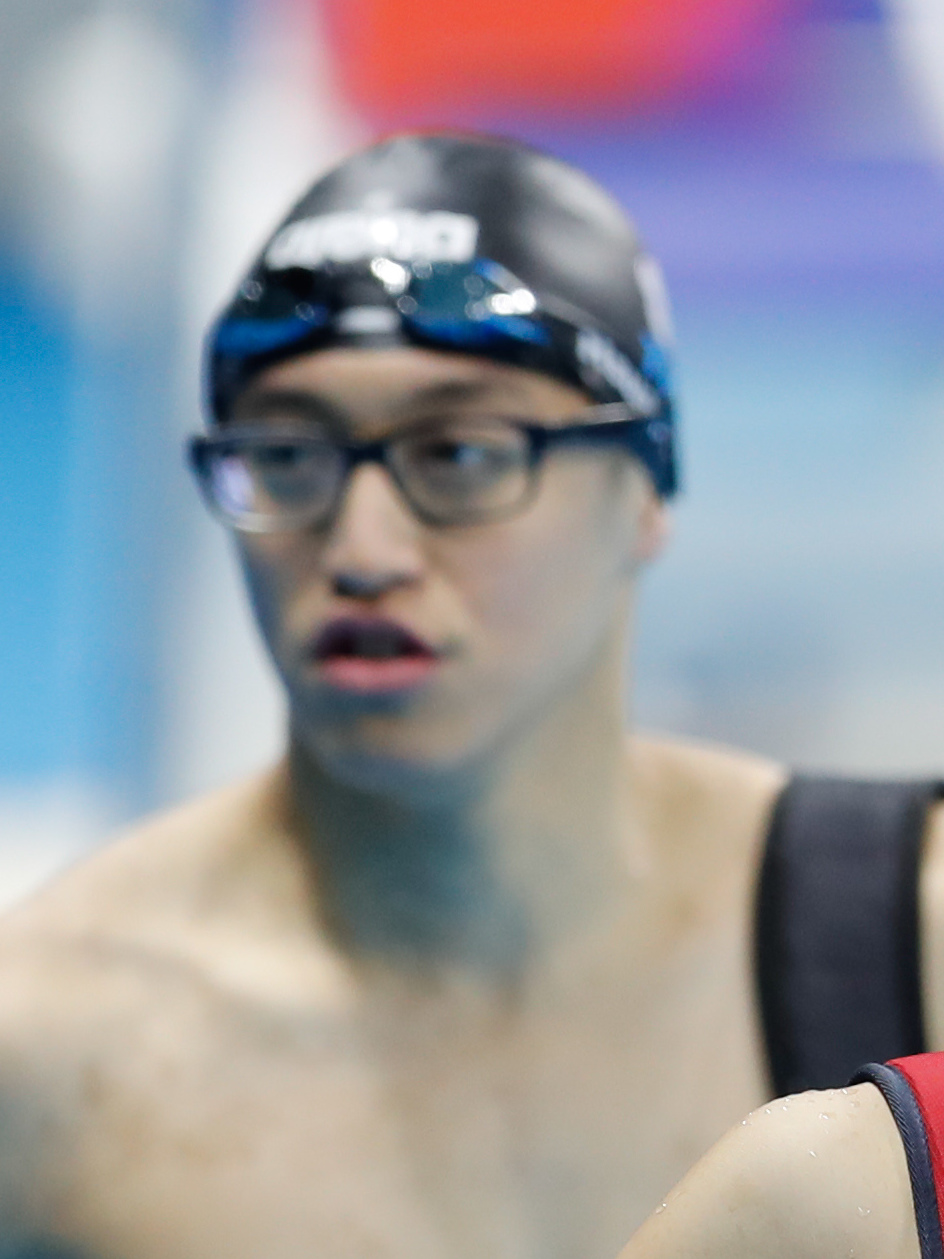

Personal information
- Born: 13 May 1993 (age 33)

Sport
- Sport: Swimming

Lee Hsuan-yen (born 13 May 1993) is a Taiwanese swimmer. He competed in the men's 200 metre breaststroke event at the 2016 Summer Olympics.
