= Yu Hexin =

Chinese swimmer (born 1996)

Personal information
- Native name: 余贺新
- Nationality: Chinese
- Born: 1 January 1996 (age 30) Canton, Guangdong, China
- Height: 1.94 m (6 ft 4 in)

Sport
- Sport: Swimming
Medal record
Men's swimming
Representing China
| Event | 1st | 2nd | 3rd |
|---|---|---|---|
| Asian Games | 3 | 1 | 1 |
| Youth Olympic Games | 4 | 1 | 0 |
| Total | 7 | 2 | 1 |
Asian Games
| Gold medal – first place | 2014 Incheon | 4×100 freestyle |
| Gold medal – first place | 2018 Jakarta-Palembang | 50 m freestyle |
| Gold medal – first place | 2018 Jakarta-Palembang | 4×100 m medley |
| Silver medal – second place | 2018 Jakarta-Palembang | 4×100 m freestyle |
| Bronze medal – third place | 2018 Jakarta-Palembang | 100 m freestyle |
Youth Olympic Games
| Gold medal – first place | 2014 Nanjing | 50 m freestyle |
| Gold medal – first place | 2014 Nanjing | 50 m butterfly |
| Gold medal – first place | 2014 Nanjing | 4×100 m mixed freestyle |
| Gold medal – first place | 2014 Nanjing | 4×100 m mixed medley |
| Silver medal – second place | 2014 Nanjing | 100 m freestyle |

Yu Hexin (Chinese: 余贺新; pinyin: Yúhèxīn born 1 January 1996) is a Chinese swimmer. He competed in the men's 4 × 100 metre freestyle relay event at the 2016 Summer Olympics. He won the men's 50m freestyle event at the 2018 Asian Games.

== Personal bests ==
As of 26 September 2021

=== Long course (50-meter pool) ===
| Event | Time | Meet | Date | Note(s) |
|---|---|---|---|---|
| 50 m freestyle | 21.68 | 2021 Chinese National Games | 26 September 2021 | NR |
| 100 m freestyle | 48.44 | 2020 Chinese National Championships | 29 September 2020 | |
| 50 m butterfly | 23.37 | 2015 Chinese National Championships | 9 April 2015 | |

=== Short course (25-meter pool) ===
| Event | Time | Meet | Date | Note(s) |
|---|---|---|---|---|
| 50 m freestyle | 21.98 | 2014 World Championships | 6 December 2014 | |
| 100 m freestyle | 48.69 | 2014 World Championships | 6 December 2014 | |
| 50 m butterfly | 23.32 | 2014 World Cup | 24 October 2014 | |
| 100 m butterfly | 55.76 | 2014 World Cup | 25 October 2014 | |

Key: NR = National Record; AS = Asian Record
