= Clement Lim =

Singaporean swimmer (born 1993)

Personal information
- Full name: Lim Yong En
- Born: 5 April 1993 (age 33) Singapore

Sport
- Sport: Swimming
- College team: Nanyang Technological University
Medal record
Men's swimming
Representing Singapore
Event	1st	2nd	3rd
Southeast Asian Games	7	0	0
Total	7	0	0
Southeast Asian Games
Gold medal – first place	2009 Vientiane	4x200 m freestyle
Gold medal – first place	2011 Palembang	4x100 m freestyle
Gold medal – first place	2011 Palembang	4×200 m freestyle
Gold medal – first place	2013 Naypyidaw	4x100 m freestyle
Gold medal – first place	2013 Naypyidaw	4×100 m medley
Gold medal – first place	2015 Singapore	4x100 m freestyle
Gold medal – first place	2015 Singapore	4×100 m medley

Clement Lim Yong En (Chinese: 林雍恩; born 5 April 1993) is a Singaporean swimmer who competed in the 50m and 100m freestyle, the 50m breaststroke, the 4x100m medley relay, and the 4x100m and 4x200m freestyle relay. Lim represented Singapore at the 2010 Youth Olympic Games (YOG).

In 2012, Lim was diagnosed with Ankylosing Spondylitis (AS), an incurable genetic disease that affects the spin and causes stiff and sore back, but went on to capture 4 gold medals at the 2013 and 2015 Southeast Asian Games (SEA Games).

== Career ==
At the 2009 SEA Games in Vientiane, Laos, Lim captured his first gold medal at the games with a game record time of 7:30.73s in the 4x200m freestyle relay event with teammates Marcus Cheah, Joshua Lim and Zach Ong. At the next meet in 2011, Lim captured two more gold medals in Palembang, Indonesia, in the 4x100m and the 4x200m freestyle relay events.

At the 2013 SEA Games in Naypyidaw, Myanmar, Lim once again set a game record, this time in the 4x100m freestyle relay with a time of 3:21.74s, with teammates Danny Yeo, Darren Lim and Joseph Schooling. He also captured a gold in the 4x100m medley relay with a time of 3:43.62s by swimming the final leg in 50.24s.

In his final SEA games appearance in 2015, Lim captured two more gold medals in Singapore, both in new game record time. In the 4x100m freestyle relay, Lim swam the third leg in 49.81s to help his team, which consisted of Joseph Schooling, Danny Yeo and Quah Zheng Wen, finish the race in 3:19.59s. Together with Quah Zheng Wen, Lionel Khoo and Joseph Schooling, Lim then swam the freestyle final leg of the 4x100m medley in 49.61s to complete the race in 3:38.25s.

Lim also participated in the 2014 Commonwealth Games and 2014 Asian Games, and recorded his personal best of 23.26s in 50m freestyle that year. He represented Singapore in the 2010 Youth Olympic Games.

== Personal life ==
In 2012, while serving his National Service, Lim lost vision in his right eye and was diagnosed with Ankylosing Spondylitis (AS). The genetic disease caused inflammation of his spinal joints and gave him perpetual stiff and sore back. As a result of his condition, Lim has to rely on drugs approved by sports medical body to cope with the pain.

In 2014, Lim's condition flared up and left him unable to swim for a month. The incident made him more eager to return to sports and motivated him to clock his personal best timing for 50m and 100m freestyle a few months later at the 2014 Commonwealth Games and the 2014 Asian Games.

Lim studied sports science and management at the Nanyang Technological University in Singapore.

=== Charity ===
Lim participated in the inaugural Swim for Rheumatology event organized by the Singapore General Hospital (SGH) to create awareness for rheumatism and raise fund for rheumatology research in Singapore. The event helped raise S$103,000 for the cause.
