= Mao Feilian =

Chinese swimmer (born 1993)

Personal information
- Nationality: Chinese
- Born: 30 July 1993 (age 32)

Sport
- Sport: Swimming
Medal record
Men's swimming
Representing China
Asian Games
Gold medal – first place	2014 Incheon	4x100 m medley
Silver medal – second place	2014 Incheon	4x200 m freestyle

Mao Feilian (born 30 July 1993) is a Chinese swimmer. He competed in the men's 200 metre breaststroke event at the 2016 Summer Olympics.
