= Li Xiang (swimmer) =

Chinese swimmer

Personal information
- Nationality: Chinese
- Born: July 2, 1993 (age 32) Tianjin, China
- Height: 1.91 m (6 ft 3 in)
- Weight: 85 kg (187 lb)

Sport
- Sport: Swimming
Medal record
Representing China
Asian Games
Gold medal – first place	2014 Incheon	4x100m medley relay
Bronze medal – third place	2014 Incheon	50m breaststroke

Li Xiang is a Chinese breaststroke swimmer.

He competed at the 2015 World Aquatics Championships and at the 2016 Summer Olympics in Rio de Janeiro.
