= Wushu at the 2014 Asian Games =

- Venue: Ganghwa Dolmens Gymnasium
- Dates: 20–24 September 2014
- Competitors: 190 from 29 nations

Wushu was contested by both men and women at the 2014 Asian Games in Incheon, South Korea from September 20 to 24, 2014. All events were held at the Ganghwa Dolmens Gymnasium.

== Schedule ==
●	Round	R	Round of 16	¼	Quarterfinals	½	Semifinals	F	Final

Event↓/Date →	20th Sat	21st Sun	22nd Mon	23rd Tue	24th Wed
Men's changquan	●				
Men's nanquan & nangun			●●		
Men's taijiquan & taijijian				●●	
Men's daoshu & gunshu		●●			
Men's sanda 56 kg	R		¼	½	F
Men's sanda 60 kg	R	R	¼	½	F
Men's sanda 65 kg	R	R	¼	½	F
Men's sanda 70 kg		R	¼	½	F
Men's sanda 75 kg		R	¼	½	F
Women's changquan				●	
Women's nanquan & nandao	●●				
Women's taijiquan & taijijian			●●		
Women's jianshu & qiangshu		●●			
Women's sanda 52 kg	R		¼	½	F
Women's sanda 60 kg	R		¼	½	F

== Medalists ==
=== Men's taolu ===
Event	Gold	Silver	Bronze
Changquan	Lee Ha-sung; South Korea	Jia Rui; Macau	Daisuke Ichikizaki; Japan
Nanquan & Nangun	Wang Di; China	Huang Junhua; Macau	Hsu Kai-kuei; Chinese Taipei
Taijiquan & Taijijian	Chen Zhouli; China	Daniel Parantac; Philippines	Nguyễn Thanh Tùng; Vietnam
Daoshu & Gunshu	Sun Peiyuan; China	Lee Yong-hyun; South Korea	Nguyễn Mạnh Quyền; Vietnam

=== Men's sanda ===
Event	Gold	Silver	Bronze
56 kg	Zhao Fuxiang; China	Bùi Trường Giang; Vietnam	Francisco Solis; Philippines
56 kg	Zhao Fuxiang; China	Bùi Trường Giang; Vietnam	Khamla Soukaphone; Laos
60 kg	Kong Hongxing; China	Jean Claude Saclag; Philippines	Narender Grewal; India
60 kg	Kong Hongxing; China	Jean Claude Saclag; Philippines	Kang Yeong-sik; South Korea
65 kg	Mohsen Mohammadseifi; Iran	Rishat Livensho; Kazakhstan	Salaheddin Baýramow; Turkmenistan
65 kg	Mohsen Mohammadseifi; Iran	Rishat Livensho; Kazakhstan	Chen Hongxing; China
70 kg	Zhang Kun; China	Yoo Sang-hoon; South Korea	Sajjad Abbasi; Iran
70 kg	Zhang Kun; China	Yoo Sang-hoon; South Korea	Maratab Ali Shah; Pakistan
75 kg	Kim Myeong-jin; South Korea	Hamid Reza Ladvar; Iran	Nursultan Tursynkulov; Kazakhstan
75 kg	Kim Myeong-jin; South Korea	Hamid Reza Ladvar; Iran	Ngô Văn Sỹ; Vietnam

=== Women's taolu ===
Event	Gold	Silver	Bronze
Changquan	Kan Wencong; China	Geng Xiaoling; Hong Kong	Tan Yan Ni; Singapore
Nanquan & Nandao	Juwita Niza Wasni; Indonesia	Wei Hong; China	Ivana Ardelia Irmanto; Indonesia
Taijiquan & Taijijian	Yu Mengmeng; China	Lindswell Kwok; Indonesia	Ai Uchida; Japan
Jianshu & Qiangshu	Dương Thúy Vi; Vietnam	Li Yi; Macau	Seo Hee-ju; South Korea

=== Women's sanda ===
Event	Gold	Silver	Bronze
52 kg	Zhang Luan; China	Elaheh Mansourian; Iran	Kim Hye-bin; South Korea
52 kg	Zhang Luan; China	Elaheh Mansourian; Iran	Yumnam Sanathoi Devi; India
60 kg	Wang Cong; China	Kao Yu-chuan; Chinese Taipei	Tân Thị Ly; Vietnam
60 kg	Wang Cong; China	Kao Yu-chuan; Chinese Taipei	Jennet Aýnazarowa; Turkmenistan

== Medal table ==
Rank	Nation	Gold	Silver	Bronze	Total
1	China (CHN)	10	1	1	12
2	South Korea (KOR)	2	2	3	7
3	Iran (IRI)	1	2	1	4
4	Vietnam (VIE)	1	1	4	6
5	Indonesia (INA)	1	1	1	3
6	Macau (MAC)	0	3	0	3
7	Philippines (PHI)	0	2	1	3
8	Chinese Taipei (TPE)	0	1	1	2
8	Kazakhstan (KAZ)	0	1	1	2
10	Hong Kong (HKG)	0	1	0	1
11	India (IND)	0	0	2	2
11	Japan (JPN)	0	0	2	2
11	Turkmenistan (TKM)	0	0	2	2
14	Laos (LAO)	0	0	1	1
14	Pakistan (PAK)	0	0	1	1
14	Singapore (SIN)	0	0	1	1
Totals (16 entries)		15	15	22	52

== Participating nations ==
A total of 190 athletes from 29 nations competed in wushu at the 2014 Asian Games:

- Afghanistan (5)
- Bangladesh (2)
- China (12)
- Chinese Taipei (8)
- Hong Kong (8)
- India (9)
- Indonesia (6)
- Iran (10)
- Japan (6)
- Jordan (4)
- Kazakhstan (4)
- Kuwait (2)
- Kyrgyzstan (6)
- Laos (7)
- Lebanon (3)
- Macau (9)
- Malaysia (8)
- Mongolia (3)
- Myanmar (7)
- Nepal (13)
- Pakistan (6)
- Philippines (5)
- Singapore (6)
- South Korea (13)
- Tajikistan (2)
- Turkmenistan (6)
- Uzbekistan (4)
- Vietnam (13)
- Yemen (3)
