= Pakistan at the 2014 Asian Games =

- IOC code: PAK
- NOC: Pakistan Olympic Association

in Incheon
- Competitors: 182 in 23 sports
- Flag bearer: Muhammad Imran
- Medals Ranked 23rd: Gold 1 Silver 1 Bronze 3 Total 5

Asian Games appearances (overview)
- 1954; 1958; 1962; 1966; 1970; 1974; 1978; 1982; 1986; 1990; 1994; 1998; 2002; 2006; 2010; 2014; 2018; 2022; 2026

Pakistan competed at the 2014 Asian Games held in Incheon, South Korea between 19 September and 5 October 2014. It sent 182 athletes to compete in 23 sports. It was defending its title in hockey (men's), squash (men's team) and cricket (women's) but successfully managed to defend the women's cricket title only.

== Medalists ==
Medal	Name	Sport	Event	Date
Gold	Pakistan national women's cricket team	Cricket	Women	26 September
Silver	Pakistan men's national field hockey team	Field Hockey	Men	2 October
Bronze	Syed Maratab Ali Shah	Wushu	Men's Sanda 70 kg	23 September
Bronze	Pakistan national kabaddi team	Kabaddi	Men	2 October
Bronze	Muhammad Waseem	Boxing	Men's Flyweight 52 kg	2 October

== Badminton ==
=== Men's Squad ===
1. Muhammad Irfan Saeed Bhatti
2. Umer Zeeshan

==== Men's singles ====
Athlete	Round of 64	Round of 32	Round of 16	Quarter Final	Semi Final	Final
Athlete	Opposition Result	Opposition Result	Opposition Result	Opposition Result	Opposition Result	Opposition Result
Muhammad Irfan Saeed Bhatti	Tamang Ratna Jit (NEP); W 2-1; 16-21, 22-20, 21-19	Derek Wong (SIN); L 0-2; 5-21, 16-21	Did Not Advance			
Umer Zeeshan	Bye	Lee Chong Wei (MAS); L 0-2; 14-21, 6-21	Did Not Advance			

==== Men's doubles ====
Athlete	Round of 32	Round of 16	Quarter Final	Semi Final	Final
Athlete	Opposition Result	Opposition Result	Opposition Result	Opposition Result	Opposition Result
Muhammad Irfan Saeed Bhatti/Umer Zeeshan	Wan Wai Chi (MAC)/ Wong Chi Chong (MAC); W 2-0; 21-13, 21-16	Kenichi Hayakawa (JPN)/ Hiroyuki Endo (JPN); L 0-2; 10-21, 11-21	Did Not Advance		

=== Women's Squad ===
1. Palwasha Bashir
2. Mahoor Shahzad

==== Women's singles ====
Athlete	Round of 32	Round of 16	Quarter Final	Semi Final	Final
Athlete	Opposition Result	Opposition Result	Opposition Result	Opposition Result	Opposition Result
Palwasha Bashir	Aishath Afnaan Rasheed (MDV); W 2-0; 21-16, 21-15	Ratchanok Intanon (THA); L 0-2; 9-21, 5-21	Did Not Advance		
Mahoor Shahzad	Nitchaon Jindapol (THA); L 0-2; 2-21, 9-21	Did Not Advance			

==== Women's doubles ====
Athlete	Round of 32	Round of 16	Quarter Final	Semi Final	Final
Athlete	Opposition Result	Opposition Result	Opposition Result	Opposition Result	Opposition Result
Palwasha Bashir/Mahoor Shahzad	U Teng Iok (MAC)/ Wong Kit Leng (MAC); L 0-2; 11-21, 8-21	Did Not Advance			

=== Mixed ===
==== Mixed doubles ====
Athlete	Round of 32	Round of 16	Quarter Final	Semi Final	Final
Athlete	Opposition Result	Opposition Result	Opposition Result	Opposition Result	Opposition Result
Umer Zeeshan/Mahoor Shahzad	Lian Min Chun (TPE)/ Chen Hsiao Huan (TPE); L 0-2; 13-21, 11-21	Did Not Advance			
Muhammad Irfan Saeed Bhatti/Palwasha Bashir	Praveen Jordan (INA)/ Debby Susanto (INA); L 0-2; 13-21, 3-21	Did Not Advance			

== Baseball ==
=== Men's Squad ===
1. Muhammad Ahsan Baig
2. Umair Imdad Bhatti
3. Adnan Butt
4. Nasir Nadeem Butt
5. Atif Dar
6. Muhammad Waqas Ismail
7. Burhan Johar
8. Khurram Raza Khan
9. Tariq Nadeem
10. Zubair Nawaz
11. Adil Sardar
12. Muhammad Abu Bakar Siddiqui
13. Dur I Hussain Syed
14. Fazal ur Rehman
15. Muhammad Usman
16. Muhammad Sumair Zawar

==== Preliminary ====
Pool A

Team	Pld	W	L	RF	RA	Pct
Japan	3	3	0	41	1	1.000
China	3	2	1	21	11	0.667
Pakistan	3	1	2	26	15	0.333
Mongolia	3	0	3	0	61	0.000

23 September; 18:30	Pakistan	1 – 9	Japan	Munhak Baseball Stadium
23 September; 18:30		Boxscore		Munhak Baseball Stadium

24 September; 18:30	Mongolia	0 – 25 (F/5)	Pakistan	Munhak Baseball Stadium
24 September; 18:30		Boxscore		Munhak Baseball Stadium

25 September; 18:30	Pakistan	0 – 6	China	Munhak Baseball Stadium
25 September; 18:30		Boxscore		Munhak Baseball Stadium

== Boxing ==
Pakistan Boxing Federation announced only one change to the 6 member squad which competed at the 2014 Commonwealth Games at Glasgow, UK, with Sanaullah (91 kg) added in place of Muhammad Asif (69 kg).

=== Men's Squad ===
Athlete	Event	Round of 32	Round of 16	Quarterfinals	Semifinals	Final
Athlete	Event	Opposition Result	Opposition Result	Opposition Result	Opposition Result	Opposition Result
Mohibullah	Light flyweight (49 kg)	Bye	Birzhan Zhakypov (KAZ); L 0-3	Did Not Advance		
Muhammad Waseem	Flyweight (52 kg)	Bye	Ri Chungil (PRK); W 2-1	Azat Usenaliev (KGZ); W TKO-I	Shakhobidin Zoirov (UZB); L 0-3	Did Not Advance
Nadir Baloch	Bantamweight (56 kg)	Phub Sigyel (BHU); W 2-1	Shiva Thapa (IND); L TKO-I	Did Not Advance		
Ali Ahmad	Lightweight (60 kg)	Ali A A H Mazafar (KUW); W 3-0	Alkasbeh Obada Mohammad Mustafa (JOR); L TKO	Did Not Advance		
Aamir Khan	Light Welterweight (64 kg)	Qraish Seif Emad Issa (JOR); W 3-0	Kawachi Masatsugu (JPN); L 0-3	Did Not Advance		
Sanaullah	Heavyweight (91 kg)	—N/a	Alqahtani Mohammed Ali K (KSA); W 3-0	Park Namhyeong (KOR); L 0-3	Did Not Advance	

== Cricket ==
The PCB has decided to send the women's team only to these Games so as to give them exposure as well as defend their title. On July 16, 2014, PCB announced the following squad for the Games. Pakistan got direct entry to the knockout stage.

=== Women's Squad ===
1. Sana Mir (Captain)
2. Bismah Maroof (Vice Captain)
3. Nain Abidi
4. Sidra Nawaz (Wicket-Keeper)
5. Nida Dar
6. Javeria Khan
7. Asmavia Iqbal
8. Marina Iqbal
9. Aliya Riaz
10. Kainat Imtiaz
11. Sumaiya Siddiqi
12. Qanita Jalil
13. Sania Khan
14. Anam Amin
15. Sadia Yousuf

==== Quarterfinals ====
24 September
09:30
Scorecard

Pakistan; 97/5 (14.0 overs)	v	Thailand; 46/7 (14.0 overs)
Nain Abidi 40 (40); Wongpaka Liengprasert 1/13 (3.0 ov)		Nattaya Boochatham 17 (24); Asmavia Iqbal 2/6 (3.0 ov)

Pakistan won by 51 runs (D/L method)
Yeonhui Cricket Ground, Incheon
Umpires: Ramani Batumalai and Buddhi Pradhan

- Thailand won the toss and chose to field
- Rain reduced the match to 14 overs per side.

==== Semifinals ====
25 September
09:30
Scorecard

Pakistan; 41/1 (8.0 overs)	v	China; 37 (19.0 overs)
Javeria Khan 21* (23); Zhou Haijie 1/14 (3.0 ov)		Zhang Mei 14 (41); Nida Dar 4/7 (3.0 ov)

Pakistan won by 9 wickets
Yeonhui Cricket Ground, Incheon
Umpires: Muhammad Kamruzzman and Buddhi Pradhan

- Pakistan won the toss and chose to field

==== Final ====
26 September
14:00
Scorecard

Pakistan; 97/6 (20.0 overs)	v	Bangladesh; 38/9 (7.0 overs)
Bismah Maroof 24 (27); Rumana Ahmed 2/13 (4.0 ov)		Farzana Hoque 10 (9); Sadia Yousuf, Nida Dar 2/2 (1.0 ov)

Pakistan won by 4 runs (D/L method)
Yeonhui Cricket Ground, Incheon
Umpires: Ramani Batumalai and Sarika Prasad

- Pakistan won the toss and chose to bat
- Rain Delay - Target revised to 43 from 7 overs (D/L method).

== Cycling ==
Pakistan sent only one athlete, who will be competing in both road and track events.

=== Men's Squad ===
1. ammar imtiaz
2. Muhammad Shakeel

==== Track ====
Athlete	Event	Qualifying		Round of 32		Round of 16		Quarterfinal		Semifinal		Final	
Athlete	Event	Time	Rank	Time	Rank	Time	Rank	Time	Rank	Time	Rank	Time	Rank
Muhammad Shakeel	Sprint	12.807	21	Did Not Advance									

Athlete	Event	Round 1		Repechage Round 1		Round 2		Final	
Athlete	Event	Gap	Rank	Gap	Rank	Gap	Rank	Gap	Rank
Muhammad Shakeel	Keirin	3.761	6	7.438	6	Did Not Advance			

==== Road ====
Athlete	Event	Time	Rank
Muhammad Shakeel	Road Race	DNF	NA

==== Track ====
Athlete	Event	Qualifying		Round of 32		Round of 16		Quarterfinal		Semifinal		Final	
Athlete	Event	Time	Rank	Time	Rank	Time	Rank	Time	Rank	Time	Rank	Time	Rank
Ammar imtiaz	Sprint	10.21	18	3.453	4	2.464	2	4.423	3	1.243	1	2.457	2

Athlete	Event	Round 1		Repechage Round 1		Round 2		Final
Athlete	Event	Gap	Rank	Gap	Rank	Gap	Rank	Gap	Rank
Ammar Imtiaz	Keirin	3.761	6	7.438	6					3.427	3

==== Road ====
Athlete	Event	Time	Rank
Ammar imtiaz	Road Race	2.234	2

== Field hockey ==
=== Men's Squad ===
1. Muhammad Imran (captain) (full back)
2. Shafqat Rasool (vice captain) (forward)
3. Imran Butt (goalkeeper)
4. Muhammad Irfan (full back)
5. Ammad Shakeel Butt (half back)
6. Muhammad Tousiq (half back)
7. Fareed Ahmed (half back)
8. Rashid Mehmood (half back)
9. Muhammad Rizwan Jr. (half back)
10. Kashif Shah (half back)
11. Muhammad Waqas (forward)
12. Muhammad Umar Bhutta (forward)
13. Abdul Haseem Khan (forward)
14. Muhammad Dilber (forward)
15. Shakeel Abbasi (forward)
16. Muhammad Rizwan Sr. (forward)

==== Preliminary ====
Group B

Team	Pld	W	D	L	GF	GA	GD	Pts
Pakistan	4	4	0	0	26	1	+25	12
India	4	3	0	1	18	2	+16	9
China	4	2	0	2	11	4	+7	6
Oman	4	1	0	3	3	21	-18	3
Sri Lanka	4	0	0	4	1	31	-30	0

September 20
17:00

Pakistan	14 – 0	Sri Lanka
Waqas 1'; Imran 2'; Irfan 12'; Irfan 14'; Imran 19'; Rizwan Sr. 20'; Bhutta 21'; Imran 25'; Bhutta 29'; Bhutta 39'; Tousiq 41'; Rizwan Sr. 45'; Rizwan Sr. 47'; Imran 54'	Report

Seonhak Hockey Stadium, Incheon

September 21
15:00

Pakistan	2 – 0	China
Khan 42'; Dilber 55'	Report

Seonhak Hockey Stadium, Incheon

September 25
17:00

Pakistan	2 – 1	India
Bhutta 38'; Waqas 54'	Report	Chandanda 53'

Seonhak Hockey Stadium, Incheon

September 27
13:00

Pakistan	8 – 0	Oman
Imran 15'; Dilber 16'; Irfan 20'; Khan 23'; Bhutta 38'; Imran 43'; Khan 47'; Irfan 60'	Report

Seonhak Hockey Stadium, Incheon

==== Semifinal ====
September 30
19:00

Pakistan	0 – 0 (a.e.t.)	Malaysia
	Report
Penalties
Rizwan Sr. (penalty shoot-out missed); Waqas (penalty shoot-out scored); Khan (penalty shoot-out scored); Mehmood (penalty shoot-out scored); Bhutta (penalty shoot-out missed) --- Khan (penalty shoot-out scored); Waqas (penalty shoot-out scored); Mehmood (penalty shoot-out scored)	6 – 5	Tengku (penalty shoot-out missed); Ashari (penalty shoot-out missed); Jalil (penalty shoot-out scored); Saabah (penalty shoot-out scored); Saari (penalty shoot-out scored) --- Saari (penalty shoot-out scored); Saabah (penalty shoot-out scored); Tengku (penalty shoot-out missed)

Seonhak Hockey Stadium, Incheon

==== Final ====
October 2
19:00

India	1 – 1 (a.e.t.)	Pakistan
Khadangbam 27'	Report	Rizwan Sr. 3'
Penalties
A Singh (penalty shoot-out scored); Rupinderpal Singh (penalty shoot-out scored); Manpreet Singh (penalty shoot-out missed); Lakra (penalty shoot-out scored); Dharamvir Singh (penalty shoot-out scored)	4 – 2	Khan (penalty shoot-out missed); Waqas (penalty shoot-out scored); Bhutta (penalty shoot-out missed); Rasool (penalty shoot-out scored)

Seonhak Hockey Stadium, Incheon

== Football ==
=== Men's tournament ===
==== Squad ====
1. Kaleemullah (FW) (Captain)
2. Saqib Hanif (GK)
3. Ahsanullah (GK)
4. Muzammil Hussain (GK)
5. Mohammad Ahmed (DF)
6. Mohammad Sohail (DF)
7. Mohammad Bilal (DF)
8. Naveed Ahmed (MF)
9. Mohsin Ali (DF)
10. Saddam Hussain (FW)
11. Ahsan Ullah (DF)
12. Mehmood Khan (MF)
13. Mohammad Riaz (MF)
14. Sher Ali (MF)
15. Mansoor Khan (FW)
16. Ashfaq Uddin (MF)
17. Mohammad Zeeshan (MF)

==== First round ====
Pos	Team	Pld	W	D	L	GF	GA	GD	Pts
1	North Korea	2	2	0	0	5	0	+5	6
2	China	2	1	0	1	1	3	−2	3
3	Pakistan	2	0	0	2	0	3	−3	0

Source: RSSSF
September 18, 2014
17:00

Pakistan	0–2	North Korea
	Report	So Kyong-jin 40' (pen.); Jong Il-gwan 67'

Hwaseong Stadium
Referee: Ahmed Al-Kaf (Oman)

September 22, 2014
20:00

China	1–0	Pakistan
Chang Feiya 20'	Report

Hwaseong Stadium
Referee: Timur Faizullin (Kyrgyzstan)

== Gymnastics ==
=== Men's Artistic Squad ===
1. Muhammad Afzal
2. Muhammad Yasir

==== Qualifying ====
Athlete	Event	F		V		PB	
Athlete	Event	Points	Rank	Points	Rank	Points	Rank
Muhammad Afzal	Individual	10.150	66	11.875	28	10.750	61
Muhammad Yasir	Individual	8.550	68	12.300	26	10.050	62

== Judo ==
=== Men's Squad ===
1. Shah Hussain Shah

Athlete	Event	Round of 16	Quarterfinals	Semifinals	Repechage	Bronze Medal Match	Final
Athlete	Event	Opposition Result	Opposition Result	Opposition Result	Opposition Result	Opposition Result	Opposition Result
Shah Hussain Shah	100 kg	Mohd Tawfiq Bakhshi (AFG); W 100-000	Maxim Rakov (KAZ); L 000-100	Did Not Advance	Nuraly Yalkapov (TKM); W 100-000	Ramziddin Sayidov (UZB); L 000-100	Did Not Advance

== Kabaddi ==
=== Men's Squad ===
1. Shabbir Ahmed
2. Hassan Ali
3. Nasir Ali
4. Wajid Ali
5. Muhammad Shahbaz Anwar
6. Syed Aqeel Hassan
7. Ibrar Hussain
8. Muhammad Kashif
9. Muhammad Nisar
10. Muhammad Rizwan
11. Wasim Sajjad
12. Atif Waheed

==== Preliminary ====
Group A

Team	Pld	W	D	L	PF	PA	PD	Pts
India	3	3	0	0	119	53	66	6
Pakistan	3	2	0	1	86	64	22	4
Thailand	3	1	0	2	94	153	-59	2
Bangladesh	3	0	0	3	62	91	-29	0

28 September; 15:00	Pakistan	51 – 30	Thailand	Songdo Global University Gymnasium, Incheon

29 September; 15:00	Pakistan	24 – 11	Bangladesh	Songdo Global University Gymnasium, Incheon

30 September; 16:00	India	23 – 11	Pakistan	Songdo Global University Gymnasium, Incheon

==== Semifinals ====
2 October; 14:00	Pakistan	14 – 25	Iran	Songdo Global University Gymnasium, Incheon

== Karate ==
=== Men's Squad ===
Athlete	Event	Round of 16	Quarterfinals	Semifinals	Repechage	Bronze Medal Match	Final
Athlete	Event	Opposition Result	Opposition Result	Opposition Result	Opposition Result	Opposition Result	Opposition Result
Baz Muhammad	Kata	Amkha Vongphachan (LAO); L 0-5	Did Not Advance				
Muhammad Kashif	55 kg	Ramon Antonio Franco (PHI); L 1-9	Did Not Advance				
Saadi Ghulam Abbas	67 kg	Saleh Ahmed Saleh Alradaei (YEM); W 4-1	Pang Iat Long (HKG); L 1-5	Did Not Advance			
Baz Muhammad	75 kg	Hosam Momdouh S Ahmed (QAT); L 2-4	Did Not Advance				
Muhammad Ramzan	84 kg	Theerapat Kangtong (THA); L 6-10	Did Not Advance				

=== Women's Squad ===
Athlete	Event	Round of 16	Quarterfinals	Semifinals	Repechage	Bronze Medal Match	Final
Athlete	Event	Opposition Result	Opposition Result	Opposition Result	Opposition Result	Opposition Result	Opposition Result
Kulsoom Hazara	Kata	Bye	Bimala Tamang (NEP); L 1-4	Did Not Advance			
Benish Akbar	50 kg	Cheung I Ching (MAC); W 9-1	Yekaterina Khupovets (KAZ); L 0-3	Did Not Advance	Elnura Kamchybekova (KGZ); L 1-4	Did Not Advance	
Kulsoom Hazara	68 kg	Pegah Zangenehkarkooti (IRI); L 0-1	Did Not Advance				

== Rowing ==
=== Men's Squad ===
1. Tanveer Arif
2. Muhammad Masood
3. Abdul Rehman

Athlete	Event	Heats		Repechage		Final	
Athlete	Event	Time	Rank	Time	Rank	Time	Rank
Abdul Rehman	Lightweight Single Sculls	8:13.75	4 R	8:05.79	5 FB	8:11.36	9
Muhammad Masood; Tanveer Arif	Lightweight Double Sculls	7:24.94	5 R	7:17.12	6 FB	7:44.00	10

Qualification Legend: F=Final; FA=Final A (medal); FB=Final B (non-medal); R=Repechage

== Rugby ==
=== Men's Squad ===
1. Ahmed Wasim Akram
2. Muhammad Basit
3. Daud Gill
4. Mian Hamza Hayaud Din
5. Muhammad Ghalib Javed
6. Muhammad Ali Khan
7. Muhammad Tahir Rafi
8. Sair Riaz
9. Syed Xeeshan Rizvi
10. Umer Usman
11. Ahmed Khalid Waqas
12. Ayub Zafar

==== Preliminary ====
Group B

Team	Pld	W	D	L	PF	PA	PD	Pts
Hong Kong	3	3	0	0	131	5	+126	9
China	3	2	0	1	72	33	+39	7
Philippines	3	1	0	2	73	59	+14	5
Pakistan	3	0	0	3	0	179	−179	3

September 30
13:12

Hong Kong	72–0	Pakistan

Namdong Asiad Rugby Field

September 30
17:14

China	48–0	Pakistan

Namdong Asiad Rugby Field

October 1
13:34

Philippines	59–0	Pakistan

Namdong Asiad Rugby Field

==== 9th-12th Place Semifinal ====
October 1
16:34

Malaysia	36–0	Pakistan

Namdong Asiad Rugby Field

==== 11th place match ====
October 2
14:06

Pakistan	12–7	Saudi Arabia

Namdong Asiad Rugby Field

== Shooting ==
=== Men's Squad ===
==== Pistol ====
1. Kalim Khan
2. Ghulam Mustafa Bashir
3. Uzair Ahmed

Athlete	Event	Qualification		Final	
Athlete	Event	Points	Rank	Points	Rank
Kalim Khan	50m pistol	540	32	Did Not Advance	
Uzair Ahmed	50m pistol	529	40	Did Not Advance	
Kalim Khan	10m air pistol	570	28	Did Not Advance	
Uzair Ahmed	10m air pistol	567	36	Did Not Advance	
Ghulam Mustafa Bashir	25m centre fire pistol	—N/a		580	10

Athlete	Event	Qualification 1		Qualification 2		Final	
Athlete	Event	Points	Rank	Points	Rank	Points	Rank
Ghulam Mustafa Bashir	25m rapid fire pistol	280	16	560	19	Did Not Advance	

==== Shotgun ====
1. Khurram Inam
2. Usman Chand
3. Fakhar-ul-Islam Qureshi
4. Aamer Iqbal

Athlete	Event	Qualification 1		Qualification 2		Semifinal		Bronze Medal		Final	
Athlete	Event	Points	Rank	Points	Rank	Points	Rank	Points	Rank	Points	Rank
Fakhar-ul-Islam Qureshi	Trap	66	26	109	35	Did Not Advance					
Usman Chand	Trap	66	27	106	40	Did Not Advance					
Aamer Iqbal	Trap	65	34	109	31	Did Not Advance					
Usman Chand; Aamer Iqbal; Fakhar-ul-Islam Qureshi	Trap team	—N/a								324	10
Usman Chand	Skeet	68	18	115	14	Did Not Advance					
Khurram Inam	Skeet	67	21	112	23	Did Not Advance					

==== Rifle ====
1. Siddique Umar
2. Muhammad Ayaz Tahir
3. Zeeshan Ul Shakir Farid

Athlete	Event	Qualification		Final	
Athlete	Event	Points	Rank	Points	Rank
Zeeshan-ul-Shakir Farid	10m air rifle	611.7	38	Did Not Advance	
Siddique Umar	10m air rifle	608.2	43	Did Not Advance	
Muhammad Ayaz Tahir	50m rifle prone	609.2	38	Did Not Advance	
Siddique Umar	50m rifle prone	608.9	41	Did Not Advance	
Muhammad Ayaz Tahir	50m rifle 3 positions	1128	36	Did Not Advance	
Siddique Umar	50m rifle 3 positions	1117	41	Did Not Advance	

=== Women's Squad ===
==== Pistol ====
1. Mahwish Farhan

Athlete	Event	Qualification		Final	
Athlete	Event	Points	Rank	Points	Rank
Mahwish Farhan	10m air pistol	368	37	Did Not Advance	

==== Rifle ====
1. Nadira Raees
2. Minhal Sohail

Athlete	Event	Qualification		Final	
Athlete	Event	Points	Rank	Points	Rank
Minhal Sohail	10m air rifle	412.2	22	Did Not Advance	
Nadira Raees	10m air rifle	390.7	53	Did Not Advance	
Nadira Raees	50m rifle 3 positions	562	38	Did Not Advance	

== Squash ==
=== Men's Squad ===
1. Nasir Iqbal
2. Farhan Zaman
3. Danish Atlas Khan
4. Farhan Mehboob

==== Men's singles ====
Athlete	Round of 32	Round of 16	Quarterfinals	Semifinals	Final
Athlete	Opposition Score	Opposition Score	Opposition Score	Opposition Score	Opposition Score
Farhan Zaman	Alsarraj Mohammad Khalil Ahmad (JOR); W 3-1; 8-11, 11-1, 11-2, 11-4	Ong Beng Hee (MAS); L 0-3; 9-11, 6-11, 3-11	did not advance		
Nasir Iqbal	Bye	Sehyun Lee (KOR); W 3-1; 6-11, 11-1, 11-4, 11-6	Saurav Ghosal (IND); L 1-3; 6-11, 11-9, 2-11, 9-11	did not advance	

==== Men's team ====
===== Preliminary =====
Pool A

Team	Pld	W	L	MF	MA
Kuwait	4	4	0	9	3
Hong Kong	4	3	1	8	4
Pakistan	4	2	2	8	4
South Korea	4	1	3	3	9
Qatar	4	0	4	2	10

23 September	Pakistan	3–0	Qatar

Danish Atlas Khan	3–0	Al Ishaq Abdulwahab Khalid M J	11–3, 11–2, 11–0
Nasir Iqbal	3–0	Al Ishaq Abdulwahab Khalid M J	11–3, 11–3, 11–7
Farhan Zaman	3–0	Mehawesh Sadam Sarhan A J	11–8, 11–2, 11–8

24 September	Pakistan	3–0	South Korea

Farhan Zaman	3–1	Lee Seungjoon	11–5, 11–7, 9–11, 11–8
Danish Atlas Khan	3–1	Hwang Joongwon	10–12, 11–6, 11–8, 15–13
Farhan Mehboob	3–0	Yoo Jaejin	11–1, 13–11, 11–5

24 September	Pakistan	1–2	Hong Kong

Nasir Iqbal	2–3	Lee Ho Yin	2–11, 11–8, 12–10, 10–12, 7–11
Farhan Zaman	2–3	Au Chun Ming	9–11, 9–11, 11–9, 11–4, 7–11
Farhan Mehboob	3–0	Tang Cheuk Yan	11–5, 11–4, 11–5

25 September	Pakistan	1–2	Kuwait

Farhan Zaman	3–1	Ammar A I A Altamimi	11–7, 11–7, 8–11, 11–4
Danish Atlas Khan	1–3	Ali B M E M Alramezi	11–8, 6–11, 8–11, 5–11
Nasir Iqbal	1–3	Abdullah Kh Kh H M Almezayen	9–11, 11–9, 3–11, 9–11

=== Women's Squad ===
1. Maria Toorpakay Wazir
2. Sammer Anjum
3. Moqaddas Ashraf
4. Riffat Khan

==== Women's singles ====
Athlete	Round of 16	Quarterfinals	Semifinals	Final
Athlete	Opposition Score	Opposition Score	Opposition Score	Opposition Score
Maria Toorpakay Wazir	Li Dongjin (CHN); W 3-1; 9-11, 13-11, 11-1, 11-2	Annie Au (HKG); L 0-3; 3-11, 4-11, 4-11	Did Not Advance	
Moqaddas Ashraf	Misaki Kobayashi (JPN); L 0-3; 2-11, 5-11, 4-11	Did Not Advance		

==== Women's team ====
Pool B

Team	Pld	W	L	MF	MA
India	3	3	0	8	1
Hong Kong	3	2	1	7	2
China	3	1	2	2	7
Pakistan	3	0	3	1	8

24 September	Pakistan	1–2	China

Maria Toorpakay Wazir	3–0	Li Dongjin	11–8, 11–9, 11–3
Moqaddas Ashraf	0–3	Gu Jinyue	5–11, 5–11, 4–11
Sammer Anjum	1–3	Xiu Chen	13–11, 8–11, 10–12, 9–11

24 September	Pakistan	0–3	India

Maria Toorpakay Wazir	2–3	Dipika Pallikal	11–8, 11–7, 10-12, 9–11, 6–11
Moqaddas Ashraf	0–3	Joshana Chinappa	4–11, 8–11, 9–11
Riffat Khan	0–3	Aparajitha Balamurukan	3–11, 3–11, 3–11

24 September	Pakistan	0–3	Hong Kong

Anjum Sammer	0–3	Chan Ho Ling	3–11, 4–11, 3–11
Riffat Khan	0–3	Liu Tsz Ling	6–11, 3–11, 3–11
Maria Toorpakay Wazir	0–3	Annie Au	3–11, 9–11, 5–11

== Swimming ==
=== Men's Squad ===
1. Nisar Ahmed
2. Nasir Ali
3. Muhammad Asif
4. Muhammad Saad

Athlete	Event	Heat		Final	
Athlete	Event	Time	Rank	Time	Rank
Nisar Ahmed	200m freestyle	DNS	NA	Did Not Advance	
Muhammad Asif	100m backstroke	1:07.48	8	Did Not Advance	
Muhammad Asif	50m backstroke	31.49	8	Did Not Advance	
Nisar Ahmed	200m individual medley	DNS	NA	Did Not Advance	
Muhammad Saad	50m freestyle	26.20	6	Did Not Advance	
Nasir Ali	100m butterfly	DNS	NA	Did Not Advance	
Muhammad Saad	50m butterfly	28.06	1	Did Not Advance	
Nasir Ali	50m butterfly	DNS	NA	Did Not Advance	
Muhammad Saad	100m freestyle	58.49	1	Did Not Advance	

=== Women's Squad ===
1. Anushe Dinyar Engineer
2. Simrah Nasir
3. Soha Sanjrani
4. Areeba Shaikh

Athlete	Event	Heat		Final	
Athlete	Event	Time	Rank	Time	Rank
Anushe Dinyar Engineer	100m breaststroke	1:24.60	7	Did Not Advance	
Areeba Shaikh	50m butterfly	31.52	6	Did Not Advance	
Simrah Nasir	50m butterfly	DNS	NA	Did Not Advance	
Areeba Shaikh	100m freestyle	1:06.52	7	Did Not Advance	
Soha Sanjrani	100m freestyle	DNS	NA	Did Not Advance	
Areeba Shaikh	50m backstroke	35.06	5	Did Not Advance	
Soha Sanjrani	100m butterfly	DNS	NA	Did Not Advance	
Anushe Dinyar Engineer	50m breaststroke	38.79	5	Did Not Advance	
Simrah Nasir	50m breaststroke	DNS	NA	Did Not Advance	
Areeba Shaikh	50m freestyle	29.55	7	Did Not Advance	

== Table tennis ==
=== Men's Squad ===
1. Muhammad Asim Qureshi
2. Syed Saleem Abbas Kazmi
3. Mohammad Rameez Khan

==== Men's singles ====
Athlete	Round 1	Round 2	Round 3	Quarterfinals	Semifinals	Final
Athlete	Opposition Score	Opposition Score	Opposition Score	Opposition Score	Opposition Score	Opposition Score
Muhammad Rameez	Che Long Lam (MAC); W Walkover	Noshad Alamiyan Daronkolaei (IRI); L 0-4; 6-11, 5-11, 4-11, 7-11	Did Not Advance			
Muhammad Asim Qureshi	Bye	Chuang Chih Yuan (TPE); L 0-4; 3-11, 7-11, 3-11, 5-11	Did Not Advance			

==== Men's doubles ====
Athlete	Round 1	Round 2	Round 3	Quarterfinals	Semifinals	Final
Athlete	Opposition Score	Opposition Score	Opposition Score	Opposition Score	Opposition Score	Opposition Score
Syed Saleem Abbas Kazmi/Muhammad Asim Qureshi	Bye	Mizutani Jun (JPN)/ Kishikawa Seiya (JPN); L 0-3; 4-11, 6-11, 4-11	Did Not Advance			

==== Men's team ====
Group C

Team	Pld	W	L	MF	MA	Pts
Japan	4	4	0	12	2	8
Chinese Taipei	4	3	1	11	3	6
Pakistan	4	2	2	6	8	4
Macau	4	1	3	5	9	2
Maldives	4	0	4	0	12	0

27 September Report	Macau	2–3	Pakistan

Che Chi Pan	0–3	Muhammad Asim Qureshi	8–11, 13–15, 7–11
Chang Hoi Wa	2–3	Muhammad Rameez	6–11, 11–6, 5–11, 11–9, 10–12
Xiao Zikang	3–2	Syed Saleem Abbas Kazmi	11–7, 7–11, 11–7, 8–11, 11–8
Chang Hoi Wa	3–0	Muhammad Asim Qureshi	13–11, 11–9, 11–7
Che Chi Pan	2–3	Muhammad Rameez	7–11, 11–6, 5–11, 11–4, 9–11

27 September Report	Japan	3–0	Pakistan

Yuto Muramatsu	3–0	Muhammad Rameez	11–4, 11–4, 11–5
Kenta Matsudaira	3–0	Muhammad Asim Qureshi	12–10, 11–4, 11–4
Koki Niwa	3–0	Syed Saleem Abbas Kazmi	11–4, 11–1, 11–5

28 September Report	Pakistan	0–3	Chinese Taipei

Muhammad Rameez	0–3	Chen Chien-an	4–11, 2–11, 1–11
Muhammad Asim Qureshi	0–3	Chiang Hung-chieh	3–11, 5–11, 8–11
Syed Saleem Abbas Kazmi	0–3	Huang Sheng-sheng	9–11, 4–11, 5–11

28 September Report	Pakistan	3–0	Maldives

Muhammad Asim Qureshi	3–0	Mohamed Zeesth Naseem	11–2, 11–8, 11–7
Muhammad Rameez	3–2	Moosa Munsif Ahmed	8–11, 11–8, 11–6, 9–11, 11–6
Syed Saleem Abbas Kazmi	3–1	Mohammad Maizaru Adam Zahir	4–11, 11–6, 11–7, 11–9

=== Women's Squad ===
1. Shabnam Bilal
2. Ayesha Iqbal Ansari
3. Rahila Kashif

==== Women's singles ====
Athlete	Round 1	Round 2	Round 3	Quarterfinals	Semifinals	Final
Athlete	Opposition Score	Opposition Score	Opposition Score	Opposition Score	Opposition Score	Opposition Score
Aisha Iqbal Ansari	Batkhishig Batsaikhan (MGL); L 1-4; 5-11, 11-9, 5-11, 9-11, 7-11	Did Not Advance				
Rahila Kashif	Bye	Suh Hyowon (KOR); L 0-4; 3-11, 3-11, 4-11, 2-11	Did Not Advance			

==== Women's doubles ====
Athlete	Round 1	Round 2	Quarterfinals	Semifinals	Final
Athlete	Opposition Score	Opposition Score	Opposition Score	Opposition Score	Opposition Score
Rahila Kashif/Shabnam Bilal	Poulomi Ghatak (IND)/ Ankita Das (IND); L 0-3; 5-11, 1-11, 7-11	Did Not Advance			

==== Women's team ====
Group C

Team	Pld	W	L	MF	MA	Pts
Japan	4	4	0	12	2	8
South Korea	4	3	1	11	3	6
Pakistan	4	2	2	6	6	4
Mongolia	4	1	3	3	9	2
Maldives	4	0	4	0	12	0

27 September Report	Mongolia	0–3	Pakistan

Enkhjin Barkhas	1–3	Rahila Kashif	11–9, 5–11, 9–11, 8–11
Batkhishig Batsaikhan	1–3	Shabnam Bilal	9–11, 11–4, 9–11, 10–12
Sodbolor Bat Ulzii	2–3	Aisha Iqbal Ansari	7–11, 11–4, 11–9, 5–11, 5–11

27 September Report	South Korea	3–0	Pakistan

Lee Eun-hee	3–0	Shabnam Bilal	11–4, 11–3, 11–6
Jeon Ji-hee	3–0	Rahila Kashif	11–1, 11–5, 11–4
Park Young-sook	3–0	Aisha Iqbal Ansari	11–5, 11–5, 11–4

28 September Report	Pakistan	0–3	Japan

Shabnam Bilal	0–3	Miu Hirano	5–11, 4–11, 6–11
Rahila Kashif	0–3	Misako Wakamiya	3–11, 5–11, 8–11
Aisha Iqbal Ansari	0–3	Sayaka Hirano	3–11, 1–11, 3–11

28 September Report	Pakistan	3–0	Maldives

Rahila Kashif	3–0	Fathimath Jumana Nimal	11–7, 12–10, 11–6
Shabnam Bilal	3–0	Mueena Mohamed	11–5, 11–7, 11–6
Aisha Iqbal Ansari	3–0	Aminath Shiura Shareef	11–6, 11–2, 11–7

=== Mixed ===
==== Mixed doubles ====
Athlete	Round 1	Round 2	Round 3	Quarterfinals	Semifinals	Final
Athlete	Opposition Score	Opposition Score	Opposition Score	Opposition Score	Opposition Score	Opposition Score
Aisha Iqbal Ansari/Syed Saleem Abbas Kazmi	Padasak Tanviriyaechakul (THA)/ Suthasini Sawettabut (THA); L 0-3; 9-11, 6-11, 3-11	Did Not Advance				
Rahila Kashif/Muhammad Asim Qureshi	Bye	Chuang Chih Yuan (TPE)/ Cheng I Ching (TPE); L 0-3; 7-11, 6-11, 4-11	Did Not Advance			

== Taekwondo ==
=== Men's Squad ===
Athlete	Event	Round of 32	Round of 16	Quarter Final	Semi Final	Final
Athlete	Event	Opposition Result	Opposition Result	Opposition Result	Opposition Result	Opposition Result
Ghazanfar Ali	54 kg	Bye	John Paul Lizardo (PHI); W 14-12	Kim Taehun (KOR); L 1-13	Did Not Advance	
Arsalan Asad Khan	63 kg	Chen Yen Ming (TPE); L 5-13	Did Not Advance			
Atief Arshad	80 kg	—N/a	Qiao Sen (CHN); L 5-14	Did Not Advance		

=== Women's Squad ===
Athlete	Event	Round of 16	Quarter Final	Semi Final	Final
Athlete	Event	Opposition Result	Opposition Result	Opposition Result	Opposition Result
Asia Batool	67 kg	Julyana Fuad Fawzi Al Sadeq (JOR); L 4-24	Did Not Advance		
Najia Rasool	73 kg	Binti Md Jaafar Nurulain (BRU); L 2-3	Did Not Advance		

== Tennis ==
=== Men's Squad ===
1. Aqeel Khan
2. Muhammad Abid

==== Men's singles ====
Athlete	Round 1	Round 2	Round 3	Quarter Final	Semi Final	Final
Athlete	Opposition Result	Opposition Result	Opposition Result	Opposition Result	Opposition Result	Opposition Result
Aqeel Khan	Ammar Alhaqbani (KSA); W 2-0; 6-4, 6-2	Lu Yen Hsun (TPE); L 0-2; 0-6, 1-6	Did Not Advance			
Muhammad Abid	Bye	Sanjar Fayziev (UZB); L 0-2; 2-6, 0-6	Did Not Advance			

==== Men's doubles ====
Athlete	Round 1	Round 2	Quarter Final	Semi Final	Final
Athlete	Opposition Result	Opposition Result	Opposition Result	Opposition Result	Opposition Result
Aqeel Khan/Muhammad Abid	Gong Maoxin (CHN)/ Li Zhe (CHN); L 0-2; 3-6, 1-6	Did Not Advance			

==== Men's team ====
Round 1	Round 2	Quarterfinals	Semifinals	Final
Opposition Result	Opposition Result	Opposition Result	Opposition Result	Opposition Result
(Qatar) Qatar; W 3-0	(China) China; L 0-3	Did Not Advance		

=== Women's Squad ===
1. Ushna Suhail
2. Sara Mansoor

==== Women's singles ====
Athlete	Round 1	Round 2	Round 3	Quarter Final	Semi Final	Final
Athlete	Opposition Result	Opposition Result	Opposition Result	Opposition Result	Opposition Result	Opposition Result
Ushna Suhail	Lee Pei Chi (TPE); L 0-2; 0-6, 2-6	Did Not Advance				
Sara Mansoor	Bye	Nigina Abduraimova (UZB); L 0-2; 0-6, 0-6	Did Not Advance			

==== Women's doubles ====
Athlete	Round 1	Round 2	Quarter Final	Semi Final	Final
Athlete	Opposition Result	Opposition Result	Opposition Result	Opposition Result	Opposition Result
Ushna Suhail/Sara Mansoor	Rishika Sunkara (IND)/ Shweta Rana (IND); L 0-2; 4-6, 0-6	Did Not Advance			

==== Women's team ====
Round 1	Round 2	Quarterfinals	Semifinals	Final
Opposition Result	Opposition Result	Opposition Result	Opposition Result	Opposition Result
(Hong Kong) Hong Kong; L 0-3	did not advance			

== Volleyball ==
=== Men ===
1. Muhammad Ismail Khan
2. Naseer Ahmed
3. Nasir Khan
4. Asif Nadeem
5. Aimal Khan
6. Syed Shujah Abbas Naqvi
7. Mohib Rasool
8. Imran Sultan
9. Mubashir Raza
10. Akhtar Ali
11. Muhammad Idrees
12. Murad Jehan

==== Preliminary ====
Pool B

Pos	Team	Pld	W	L	Pts	SW	SL	SR	SPW	SPL	SPR	Qualification
1	Japan	3	3	0	9	9	1	9.000	247	182	1.357	Play-off / Group E–F
2	Kuwait	3	2	1	6	7	3	2.333	224	224	1.000	Play-off / Group E–F
3	Saudi Arabia	3	1	2	3	3	6	0.500	184	210	0.876	Play-off / Group G–H
4	Pakistan	3	0	3	0	0	9	0.000	186	225	0.827	Play-off / Group G–H

Source: Results

Date	Time	Venue		Score		Set 1	Set 2	Set 3	Set 4	Set 5	Total	Report
20 Sep	12:30	SOG	Pakistan	0–3	Kuwait	22–25	21–25	16–25			59–75	59–75
23 Sep	15:30	ASG	Pakistan	0–3	Japan	23–25	23–25	23–25			69–75	69–75
26 Sep	17:30	ASG	Saudi Arabia	3–0	Pakistan	25–15	25–20	25–23			75–58	75–58

==== Playoff ====
Pool H

Pos	Team	Pld	W	L	Pts	SW	SL	SR	SPW	SPL	SPR	Qualification
1	Saudi Arabia	3	2	1	7	8	4	2.000	277	257	1.078	Classification 9th–12th
2	Pakistan	3	2	1	6	6	3	2.000	213	210	1.014	Classification 9th–12th
3	Turkmenistan	3	1	2	3	4	7	0.571	253	268	0.944	Classification 13th–16th
4	Myanmar	3	1	2	2	4	8	0.500	266	274	0.971	Classification 13th–16th

Source: Results

Date	Time	Venue		Score		Set 1	Set 2	Set 3	Set 4	Set 5	Total	Report
28 Sep	16:30	ASG	Pakistan	3–0	Turkmenistan	30–28	25–23	25–18			80–69	80–69
29 Sep	16:30	ASG	Pakistan	3–0	Myanmar	25–21	25–22	25–23			75–66	75–66

==== 9th–12th semifinals ====
Date	Time	Venue		Score		Set 1	Set 2	Set 3	Set 4	Set 5	Total	Report
30 Sep	19:30	SOG	Chinese Taipei	3–0	Pakistan	25–19	26–24	25–19			76–62	76–62

==== 11th place match ====
Date	Time	Venue		Score		Set 1	Set 2	Set 3	Set 4	Set 5	Total	Report
01 Oct	16:30	ASG	Saudi Arabia	0–3	Pakistan	27–29	17–25	16–25			60–79	60–79

== Weightlifting ==
=== Men's Squad ===
Athlete	Event	Snatch	Clean & Jerk	Total	Rank
Muhammad Shehzad	56 kg	111	DNF	DNF	NA
Abu Sufyan	69 kg	113	135	248	16
Muhammad Habib Asghar	85 kg	126	151	277	11
Haroon Shoukat	105 kg	145	167	312	11

== Wrestling ==
=== Men's Squad ===
1. Muhammad Inam
2. Bilal Hussain Awan
3. Muhammad Bilal
4. Muhammad Asad Butt
5. Sheraz Mohammed Ahmed Khan Qasuri

==== Freestyle ====
Athlete	Event	Round of 16	Quarterfinals	Semifinals	Repechage	Bronze Medal Match	Final
Athlete	Event	Opposition Result	Opposition Result	Opposition Result	Opposition Result	Opposition Result	Opposition Result
Muhammad Bilal	57 kg	Ramil Rejepov (TKM); L 0-4	Did Not Advance				
Muhammad Asad Butt	74 kg	Bye	Ezzatollah Akbarizarinkolaei (IRI); L 0-4	Did Not Advance	—N/a	Lee Sangkyu (KOR); L 1-3	Did Not Advance
Muhammad Inam	86 kg	Phoenaxay Phachanxay (LAO); W 5-0	Yesbolat Nurzhumbayev (KAZ); L 1-4	Did Not Advance	Umidjon Ismanov (UZB); L 0-4	Did Not Advance	
Bilal Hussain Awan	97 kg	Magomed Musaev (KGZ); L 0-4	Did Not Advance		Satywart Kadian (IND); L 0-4	Did Not Advance	

== Wushu ==
=== Men's Sanda ===
Athlete	Event	Round of 16	Quarter Final	Semi Final	Final
Athlete	Event	Opposition Result	Opposition Result	Opposition Result	Opposition Result
Shams-Ur-Rehman	56 kg	Francisco Solis (PHI); L 0-2	Did Not Advance		
Abdullah	60 kg	Abuhasoah Aday Ali Abdulraheem (JOR); W 2-0	Narendar Grewal (IND); L 0-2	Did Not Advance	
Ubaidullah	65 kg	Bye	Salaheddin Bayramov (TKM); L 0-2	Did Not Advance	
Syed Maratab Ali Shah	70 kg	Bye	Nurlanbek Mamateliev (KGZ); W 2-0	Zhang Kun (CHN); L 0-0 Technical Superiority	Did Not Advance

=== Women's Sanda ===
Athlete	Event	Round of 16	Quarter Final	Semi Final	Final
Athlete	Event	Opposition Result	Opposition Result	Opposition Result	Opposition Result
Hiba Moazzam	52 kg	Albina Mambetova (KGZ); L 0-2	Did Not Advance		
Rukhsana Hanif	60 kg	Bye	Tan Thi Ly (VIE); L 0-1	Did Not Advance	

== See also ==
- 2014 Asian Games
