= Turkmenistan at the 2014 Asian Games =

- IOC code: TKM
- NOC: National Olympic Committee of Turkmenistan

in Incheon
- Flag bearer: Kurban Kurbandurdyýew
- Medals Ranked 31st: Gold 0 Silver 1 Bronze 5 Total 6

Asian Games appearances (overview)
- 1994; 1998; 2002; 2006; 2010; 2014; 2018; 2022; 2026

Turkmenistan participated in the 2014 Asian Games held in Incheon, South Korea from 19 September to 4 October 2014.

80 Turkmen athletes were competing in 12 disciplines: athletics, boxing, cycling road, judo, karate, swimming, taekwondo, tennis, volleyball, weightlifting, wrestling, and wushu.

Turkmen sportsmen won 6 medals (1 silver and 5 bronze) and end up 32 out of 37 countries that took part in the Games.

== Medal table ==
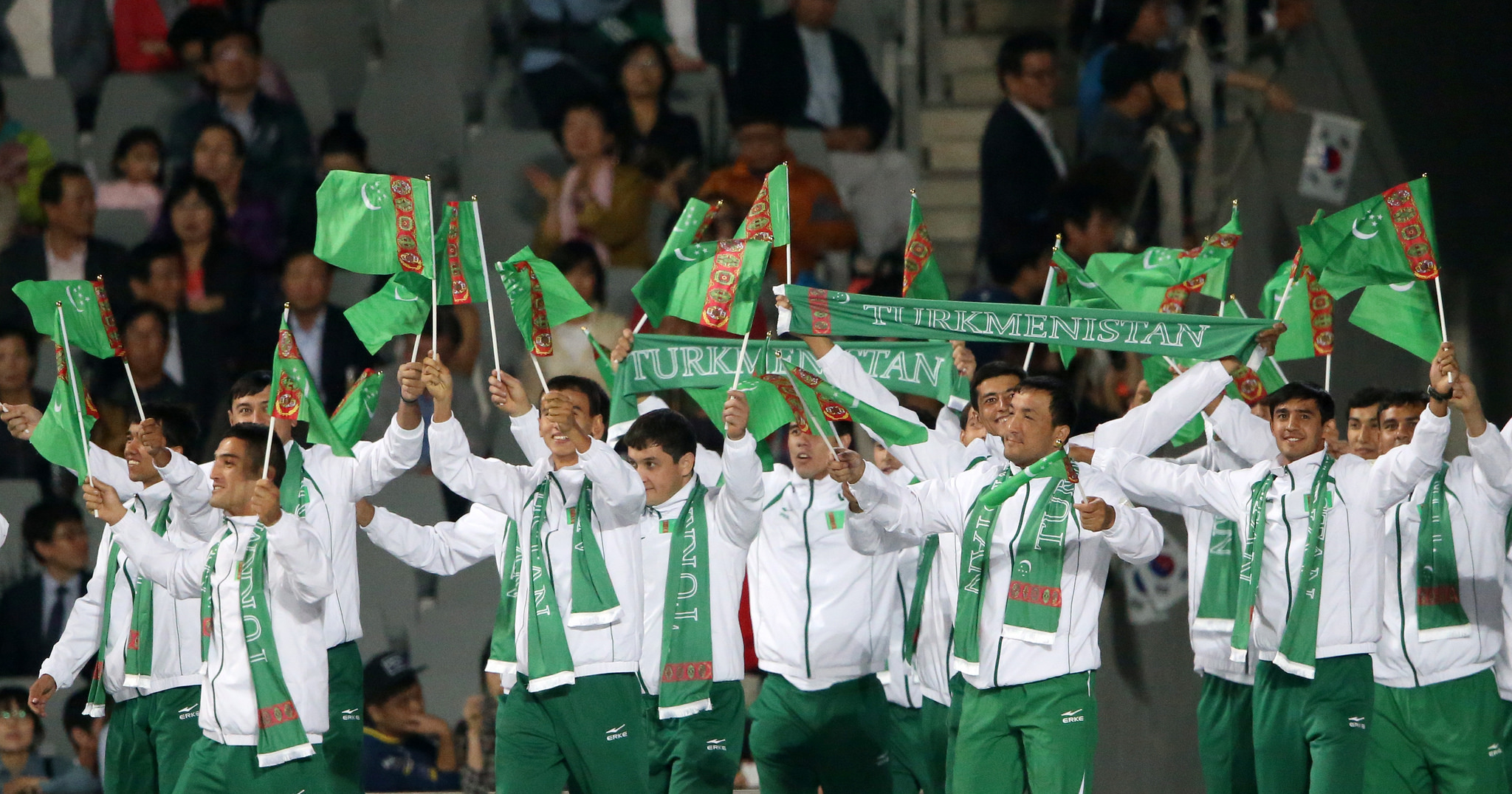
Turkmenistan team

Sport	Gold	Silver	Bronze	Total
Boxing	0	0	2	2
Judo	0	1	0	1
Wrestling	0	0	1	1
Wushu	0	0	2	2
Total	0	1	5	6

=== Medalists ===
Medal	Name	Sport	Event
Silver	Gulbadam Babamuratova	Judo	Women's 52 kg
Bronze	Aziz Bebitov	Boxing	Men's 64 kg
Bronze	Serdar Hudayberdiyev	Boxing	Men's 69 kg
Bronze	Shermet Permanov	Wrestling	Men's Greco-Roman 71 kg
Bronze	Salaheddin Bayramov	Wushu	Men's sanda 65 kg
Bronze	Jennet Aynazarova	Wushu	Women's sanda 60 kg

== Athletics ==
Men's

Athlete	Event	Final	
Athlete	Event	Result	Rank
Tejen Hommadov	Shot put	15.16	12
Mergen Mammedov	Hammer throw	68.68	7

Women

Athlete	Event	Round 1			Final	
Athlete	Event	Heat	Time	Rank	Time	Rank
Valentina Meredova	100 m	2	12.06	13	Did not advance	
Maysa Rejepova	200 m	3	25.34	16	Did not advance	

== Boxing ==
Men

Athlete	Event	Round of 32	Round of 16	Quarterfinal	Semifinal	Final	Rank
Zarip Jumaýew	52 kg	Bye	Al-Otaibi (KUW); W TKO	Hayashida (JPN); L 0-2	Did not advance		5
Ýakub Meredow	56 kg	Bye	Tögstsogt (MGL); L 0-3	Did not advance			9
Shohrat Durdiyev	60 kg	Bye	Otgondalai (MGL); L 0-3	Did not advance			9
Aziz Bebitow	64 kg	Bye	Khanxay (LAO); W 3-0	Kadhim (IRQ); W 3-0	Wuttichai (THA); L 0-3	Did not advance	3rd place, bronze medalist(s)
Serdar Hudaýberdiýew	69 kg	Bye	Al-Assi (JOR); W 3-0	Ghasemipour (IRI); W 3-0	Yeleussinov (KAZ); L 0-3	Did not advance	3rd place, bronze medalist(s)
Aziz Achilov	75 kg	Lopez (PHI); L 1-2	Did not advance				17
Arslanbek Açilow	81 kg		Kim (KOR); L 0-3	Did not advance			9

== Cycling ==
=== Road ===
Men

Athlete	Event	Time	Rank
Iner Jumaýew	Road race	4:17:06	23
Röwşen Amangeldiýew	Road race	4:17:06	24
Röwşen Amangeldiýew	Time trial	59:25.69	17

== Judo ==
Men

Athlete	Event	Elimination round of 32	Elimination round of 16	Quarterfinal	Semifinal	Final	Rank
Begli Meretgeldiýew	60 kg	Bahramian (IRI); L 000–001	Did not advance				17
Kemal Amanow	66 kg	Khousrof (YEM); L 000–002	Did not advance				17
Samwel Aýrapetýan	73 kg	Masayuki (THA); W 111–000	Hong (PRK); L 001–011	Did not advance			9
Tejen Tejenow	81 kg	Sheaibi (KUW); W 100–000	Pak (PRK); L 000-102	Did not advance			9
Batyr Hojamuhammedov	90 kg	Bye	Ustopiriyon (TJK); L 000–101	Did not advance			9
Nuraly Ýalkapow	100 kg	Bye	Mahjoub (IRI); L 000–101		Repechage; Hussain Shah (PAK); L 000-100	Did not advance	7
Hudaýberdi Sahatow	+100 kg		Liu (CHN); L 000–110	Did not advance			9
Begli Meretgeldiýew; Kemal Amanow; Samwel Aýrapetýan; Tejen Tejenow; Batyr Hojamuhammedov; Nuraly Ýalkapow; Hudaýberdi Sahatow	Team		Bye	Mongolia; L 0-5	Repechage; Iran; L 2-3	Did not advance	7

Women

Athlete	Event	Elimination round of 16	Quarterfinal	Semifinal	Final	Rank
Gülbadam Babamuratowa	52 kg	Beldiagina (KGZ); W 100–000	Jung (KOR); W 001–000	Mingazova (KAZ); W 001–000	Nakamura (JPN); L 000–100	2nd place, silver medalist(s)
Zuhra Madraimowa	57 kg	Kwok (HKG); W 001–000	Yamamoto (JPN); L 000–100	Repechage; Pongchaliew (THA); W 011–000	3rd place match Sumiyaa (MGL); L 000-101	5
Gülnar Haýytbaýewa	63 kg	Watanabe (PHI); L 000–100	Did not advance			9
Nasiba Surkiýewa	70 kg	Kudarova (KAZ); L 000–100	Did not advance			9

== Karate ==
Men's kumite

Athlete	Event	1/16 final	1/8 final	Quarterfinal	Semifinal	Final	Rank
Perman Işanow	Individual kata		Shimbaba (JPN); L 0–5	Did not advance			9
Amangeldi Bäşimow	60 kg	Bye	Liu (TPE); L 0-8	Did not advance			9
Sapadurdy Setdarow	67 kg	Bye	Maharjan (NEP); L 1-9	Did not advance			9
Aýbik Ýuldaşew	+84 kg		Al-Loh (PLE); W 8-0	Al-Mutairi (KUW); L 1-6		3rd place match Khalidov (KAZ); L 0–8	5

== Swimming ==
Men

Athlete	Event	Heats		Final	
Athlete	Event	Time	Rank	Time	Rank
Sergeý Krowýakow	50 m freestyle	24.96	26	Did not advance	
Sergeý Krowýakow	100 m freestyle	55.52	26	Did not advance	
Merdan Ataýew	50 m backstroke	26.31	9 SO	Did not advance	
Merdan Ataýew	100 m backstroke	56.63	7 Q	56.63	7

Women

Athlete	Event	Heats		Final	
Athlete	Event	Time	Rank	Time	Rank
Merjen Saryýewa	50 m freestyle	29.67	19	Did not advance	
Merjen Saryýewa	50 m butterfly	31.86	16	Did not advance	
Keýik Weliýewa	100 m freestyle	1:08.77	24	Did not advance	
Keýik Weliýewa	50 m breaststroke	39.32	16	Did not advance	

== Taekwondo ==
Men

Athlete	Event	1/16 final	1/8 final	Quarterfinal	Semifinal	Final	Rank
Aleksandr Kuwarzin	54 kg	Bye	Huang (TPE); L 4-30	Did not advance			9
Berdi Berdiýew	58 kg	Bye	Yamada (JPN); L 5-19	Did not advance			9
Şanepes Hudaýberdiýew	63 kg	Bye	Hamada (JPN); L 1-14	Did not advance			9

Women

Athlete	Event	1/16 final	1/8 final	Quarterfinal	Semifinal	Final	Rank
Selbi Kiçigulowa	49 kg		Rosa (TLS); L 2-16	Did not advance			9
Aýlar Gurbanowa	53 kg		Wu (CHN); L 2-17	Did not advance			9

== Tennis ==
Men

Athlete	Event	Round 1	Round 2	Round 3	Quarter Final	Semi Final	Final	Rank
Athlete	Event	Opposition Result	Opposition Result	Opposition Result	Opposition Result	Opposition Result	Opposition Result	Rank
Aleksandr Ernepesov	Singles	Wangchuk (BHU); W 2-0; 6-4 6-0	Nishioka (JPN); L 0-2; 1-6 1-6	Did not advance				17
Isa Mämmetgulyýew	Singles	Bye	Isaro (THA); L 0-2; 2-6 3-6	Did not advance				17
Aleksandr Ernepesov; Georgiý Poçaý	Doubles		Bajracharya (NEP); Karki (NEP); W 2-0; 6-1 6-2	Gong (CHN); Li (CHN); L 0-2; 2-6 0-6	Did not advance			9
Aleksandr Ernepesov; Isa Mämmetgulyýew; Georgiý Poçaý	team		(Cambodia); Cambodia; W 3-0	(South Korea); South Korea; L 0-3	Did not advance			9

Women

Athlete	Event	Round 1	Round 2	Round 3	Quarter Final	Semi Final	Final	Rank
Athlete	Event	Opposition Result	Opposition Result	Opposition Result	Opposition Result	Opposition Result	Opposition Result	Rank
Jahan Baýramowa	Singles	Bye	Jang (KOR); L 0-2; 0-6 1-6	Did not advance				17
Anastasiýa Prenko	Singles	Bye	Lee (KOR); L 0-2; 1-6 0-6	Did not advance				17
Jahan Baýramowa; Anastasiýa Prenko	Team			(Japan); Japan; L 0-3	Did not advance			9

Mixed Doubles

Athlete	Event	Round 1	Quarter Final	Semi Final	Final	Rank
Athlete	Event	Opposition Result	Opposition Result	Opposition Result	Opposition Result	Rank
Isa Mämmetgulyýew; Anastasiýa Prenko	Mixed Doubles	Sharan (IND); Raina (IND); L 0-2; 4-6 1-6	Did not advance			9

== Volleyball ==
Men

Squad list	Preliminary round		Play-off 9–16		Quarterfinal	Semifinal	Final	Rank
Squad list	Group D	Rank	Group H	Rank	Quarterfinal	Semifinal	Final	Rank
Gurbanmuhammet Gylyçdurdyýew; Berdimämmet Täçgeldiýew; Bahram Rozmetow; Ýusup Gurbanow; Merdan Azimow; Döwletgeldi Nuryýew; Mekan Massarow; Didar Nuryýew; Dawut Nuryýew; Ruslan Artykow; Begli Myratgeldiýew; Ezizmyrat Gaýypow	Thailand; L 0–3; 22–25, 16–25, 17–25	3	Pakistan; L 0–3; 28–30, 23–25, 18–25	3		Semifinal 13th–16th Maldives; W 3-1; 25–16, 16–25, 25–18, 25–12	Classification 13th–14th Myanmar; W 3-1; 17-25, 25–18, 25–16, 25–14	13
Gurbanmuhammet Gylyçdurdyýew; Berdimämmet Täçgeldiýew; Bahram Rozmetow; Ýusup Gurbanow; Merdan Azimow; Döwletgeldi Nuryýew; Mekan Massarow; Didar Nuryýew; Dawut Nuryýew; Ruslan Artykow; Begli Myratgeldiýew; Ezizmyrat Gaýypow	China; L 0–3; 15–25, 8–25, 10–25	3	Saudi Arabia; L 1-3; 25–23, 19–25, 20–25, 24–26	3		Semifinal 13th–16th Maldives; W 3-1; 25–16, 16–25, 25–18, 25–12	Classification 13th–14th Myanmar; W 3-1; 17-25, 25–18, 25–16, 25–14	13
Gurbanmuhammet Gylyçdurdyýew; Berdimämmet Täçgeldiýew; Bahram Rozmetow; Ýusup Gurbanow; Merdan Azimow; Döwletgeldi Nuryýew; Mekan Massarow; Didar Nuryýew; Dawut Nuryýew; Ruslan Artykow; Begli Myratgeldiýew; Ezizmyrat Gaýypow	Myanmar; W 3–1; 25–17, 27–25, 19–25, 25–22	3				Semifinal 13th–16th Maldives; W 3-1; 25–16, 16–25, 25–18, 25–12	Classification 13th–14th Myanmar; W 3-1; 17-25, 25–18, 25–16, 25–14	13

== Weightlifting ==
Athlete	Event	Snatch	Clean & jerk	Total	Rank
Men
Umurbek Bazarbayev	62 kg	137	164	301	4
Omarguly Handurdyýew	62 kg	120	152	272	11
Meretguly Sähetmyradow	69 kg	134	170	304	9
Rejepbaý Rejepow	77 kg	160	185	345	4
Daýanç Aşyrow	77 kg	150	175	325	7
Inoýat Jumaýew	85 kg	155	187	342	6
Jasurbek Jumaýew	94 kg	161	195	356	5
Hojamuhammet Toýçyýew	+105 kg	189	226	415	5

== Wrestling ==
Men's freestyle

Athlete	Event	1/8 final	Quarterfinal	Semifinal	Final	Rank
Ramil Rejepow	57 kg	Bilal (PAK); W 10–0	Morishita (JPN); L 0–6	Did not advance		8
Batyr Borjakow	61 kg	Niyazbekov (KAZ); L 1–9	Did not advance			12
Ramazan Kambarow	74 kg	Al-Quhali (YEM); W 10–0	Kurbanov (UZB); L 0-10	Repechage match Yadav (IND); L 1-11	Did not advance	8
Ýusup Melejaýew	86 kg	Fahriansyah (INA); W 6–4	Kadirov (TJK); L 2-6	Did not advance		10
Nurýagdy Karataýew	97 kg	Bye	Yoon (KOR); L 0-5	Did not advance		8

Men's Greco-Roman

Athlete	Event	1/8 final	Quarterfinal	Semifinal	Final	Rank
Arslan Oraşew	66 kg	Zhanbirov (KAZ); L 0-9	Did not advance			11
Şermet Permanow	71 kg	Bye	Turdiev (UZB); L 0-10		3rd place match Fujimura (JPN); W 4^{F} -6	3rd place, bronze medalist(s)
Amanaly Ataýew	75 kg	Kanakubo (JPN); L 1-5		Repechage match Saputra (INA); W 7-1	3rd place match Bouyeri (IRI); L 0-9	5
Kyýas Esenow	85 kg	Beishebekov (KGZ); L 0-4	Did not advance			8
Arslan Saparmämmedow	98 kg	Bye	Abdulloev (TJK); W 7–4	Xiao (CHN); L 0-2	3rd place match Saikawa (JPN); L 0–8	5

Women's freestyle

Athlete	Event	1/8 final	Quarterfinal	Semifinal	Final	Rank
Margarita Filippowa	48 kg	Bye	Sun (CHN); L 2-12	Repechage match Amanzhol (KAZ); L 0-10	Did not advance	11
Wioletta Şumilowa	63 kg	Jaratrawee (THA); L 0-10	Did not advance			11

== Wushu ==
Men's sanda

Athlete	Event	Round of 16	Quarterfinal	Semifinal	Final	Rank
Çarygylyç Tagangylyjow	56 kg	Bye	Soukaphone (LAO); L 0-2	Did not advance		5
Salaheddin Baýramow	65 kg	Bimoljit (IND); W KO	Ubaidullah (PAK); W 2–0	Livensho (KAZ); L 1–2	Did not advance	3rd place, bronze medalist(s)
Goçmyrat Jumanyýazow	70 kg	Bye	Abbasi (IRI); L 0–2	Did not advance		5
Kemal Sähedow	75 kg	Kim (KOR); L 0–2	Did not advance			9

Women's sanda

Athlete	Event	Round of 16	Quarterfinal	Semifinal	Final	Rank
Aýgül Rahymowa	52 kg	Gurung (NEP); L 0–2	Did not advance			9
Jennet Aýnazarowa	60 kg	Zuunnast (MGL); W 2-0	Lama (NEP); W 2-0	Yu (TPE); L 0-2	Did not advance	3rd place, bronze medalist(s)
