= Boxing at the 2014 Asian Games – Men's 69 kg =

Boxing competitions

Men's 69 kg at the 2014 Asian Games
- Venue: Seonhak Gymnasium
- Date: 24 September – 3 October 2014
- Competitors: 18 from 18 nations

Medalists
gold medal	Daniyar Yeleussinov	Kazakhstan
silver medal	Israil Madrimov	Uzbekistan
bronze medal	Serdar Hudaýberdiýew	Turkmenistan
bronze medal	Apichet Saensit	Thailand

The men's welterweight (69 kilograms) event at the 2014 Asian Games took place from 24 September to 3 October 2014 at Seonhak Gymnasium, Incheon, South Korea.

== Schedule ==
All times are Korea Standard Time (UTC+09:00)

Date	Time	Event
Wednesday, 24 September 2014	14:00	Preliminaries 1
Saturday, 27 September 2014	19:00	Preliminaries 2
Monday, 29 September 2014	19:00	Quarterfinals
Thursday, 2 October 2014	14:00	Semifinals
Friday, 3 October 2014	14:00	Final

== Results ==
Legend

- TKO — Won by technical knockout

=== Final ===
Final
Daniyar Yeleussinov (KAZ)	3
Israil Madrimov (UZB)	0

=== Top half ===
Preliminaries 1

Preliminaries 2
Mohammad Al-Assi (JOR)	0
Serdar Hudaýberdiýew (TKM)	3
Amin Ghasemipour (IRI)	3
Salem Faqihi (KSA)	0
Su Chin-cheng (TPE)	0
Daniyar Yeleussinov (KAZ)	3
Huzam Nabaah (QAT)	0
Byambyn Tüvshinbat (MGL)	3

Quarterfinals
Serdar Hudaýberdiýew (TKM)	3
Amin Ghasemipour (IRI)	0
Daniyar Yeleussinov (KAZ)	3
Byambyn Tüvshinbat (MGL)	0

Semifinals
Serdar Hudaýberdiýew (TKM)	0
Daniyar Yeleussinov (KAZ)	3

=== Bottom half ===
Preliminaries 1
Yasuhiro Suzuki (JPN)	3
Ku Gyo-seong (KOR)	0
Erkinbek Bolotbek Uulu (KGZ)	3
Sonam Thinley (BHU)	0

Preliminaries 2
Elio Jenoveva da Silva (TLS)
Apichet Saensit (THA)	TKO
Mandeep Jangra (IND)	2
Liu Wei (CHN)	1
Israil Madrimov (UZB)	TKO
Dipesh Lama (NEP)
Yasuhiro Suzuki (JPN)	3
Erkinbek Bolotbek Uulu (KGZ)	0

Quarterfinals
Apichet Saensit (THA)	3
Mandeep Jangra (IND)	0
Israil Madrimov (UZB)	TKO
Yasuhiro Suzuki (JPN)

Semifinals
Apichet Saensit (THA)	0
Israil Madrimov (UZB)	3
