= Boxing at the 2014 Asian Games =

Boxing competitions

- Venue: Seonhak Gymnasium
- Dates: 24 September – 3 October 2014
- Competitors: 216 from 34 nations

A boxing event at the 2014 Asian Games was held in the Seonhak Gymnasium in Incheon, South Korea from September 24, 2014 to October 3, 2014.

== Schedule ==
P	Round of 32	R	Round of 16	¼	Quarterfinals	½	Semifinals	F	Final

Event↓/Date →	24th Wed	25th Thu	26th Fri	27th Sat	28th Sun	29th Mon	30th Tue	1st Wed	2nd Thu	3rd Fri
Men's 49 kg		P			R		¼		½	F
Men's 52 kg		P		R		¼			½	F
Men's 56 kg	P		R				¼		½	F
Men's 60 kg	P		R			¼			½	F
Men's 64 kg		P			R		¼		½	F
Men's 69 kg	P			R		¼			½	F
Men's 75 kg		P				R	¼		½	F
Men's 81 kg			R			¼			½	F
Men's 91 kg			R				¼		½	F
Men's +91 kg			R				¼		½	F
Women's 51 kg				R	¼		½	F		
Women's 60 kg				R	¼		½	F		
Women's 75 kg				R	¼		½	F		

== Medalists ==
=== Men ===
Event	Gold	Silver	Bronze
Light flyweight (49 kg)	Shin Jong-hun; South Korea	Birzhan Zhakypov; Kazakhstan	Turat Osmonov; Kyrgyzstan
Light flyweight (49 kg)	Shin Jong-hun; South Korea	Birzhan Zhakypov; Kazakhstan	Mark Anthony Barriga; Philippines
Flyweight (52 kg)	Ilyas Suleimenov; Kazakhstan	Shakhobidin Zoirov; Uzbekistan	Muhammad Waseem; Pakistan
Flyweight (52 kg)	Ilyas Suleimenov; Kazakhstan	Shakhobidin Zoirov; Uzbekistan	Shota Hayashida; Japan
Bantamweight (56 kg)	Ham Sang-myeong; South Korea	Zhang Jiawei; China	Kairat Yeraliyev; Kazakhstan
Bantamweight (56 kg)	Ham Sang-myeong; South Korea	Zhang Jiawei; China	Mario Fernandez; Philippines
Lightweight (60 kg)	Dorjnyambuugiin Otgondalai; Mongolia	Charly Suarez; Philippines	Satoshi Shimizu; Japan
Lightweight (60 kg)	Dorjnyambuugiin Otgondalai; Mongolia	Charly Suarez; Philippines	Obada Al-Kasbeh; Jordan
Light welterweight (64 kg)	Wuttichai Masuk; Thailand	Lim Hyun-chul; South Korea	Aziz Bebitow; Turkmenistan
Light welterweight (64 kg)	Wuttichai Masuk; Thailand	Lim Hyun-chul; South Korea	Masatsugu Kawachi; Japan
Welterweight (69 kg)	Daniyar Yeleussinov; Kazakhstan	Israil Madrimov; Uzbekistan	Serdar Hudaýberdiýew; Turkmenistan
Welterweight (69 kg)	Daniyar Yeleussinov; Kazakhstan	Israil Madrimov; Uzbekistan	Apichet Saensit; Thailand
Middleweight (75 kg)	Zhanibek Alimkhanuly; Kazakhstan	Odai Al-Hindawi; Jordan	Vikas Krishan Yadav; India
Middleweight (75 kg)	Zhanibek Alimkhanuly; Kazakhstan	Odai Al-Hindawi; Jordan	Wilfredo Lopez; Philippines
Light heavyweight (81 kg)	Adilbek Niyazymbetov; Kazakhstan	Kim Hyeong-kyu; South Korea	Oybek Mamazulunov; Uzbekistan
Light heavyweight (81 kg)	Adilbek Niyazymbetov; Kazakhstan	Kim Hyeong-kyu; South Korea	Ehsan Rouzbahani; Iran
Heavyweight (91 kg)	Anton Pinchuk; Kazakhstan	Ali Mazaheri; Iran	Ihab Al-Matbouli; Jordan
Heavyweight (91 kg)	Anton Pinchuk; Kazakhstan	Ali Mazaheri; Iran	Park Nam-hyeong; South Korea
Super heavyweight (+91 kg)	Ivan Dychko; Kazakhstan	Jasem Delavari; Iran	Satish Kumar; India
Super heavyweight (+91 kg)	Ivan Dychko; Kazakhstan	Jasem Delavari; Iran	Mirzohid Abdullaev; Uzbekistan

=== Women ===
Event	Gold	Silver	Bronze
Flyweight (51 kg)	Mary Kom; India	Zhaina Shekerbekova; Kazakhstan	Lê Thị Bằng; Vietnam
Flyweight (51 kg)	Mary Kom; India	Zhaina Shekerbekova; Kazakhstan	Myagmardulamyn Nandintsetseg; Mongolia
Lightweight (60 kg)	Yin Junhua; China	Park Jin-a; South Korea	Laishram Sarita Devi; India
Lightweight (60 kg)	Yin Junhua; China	Park Jin-a; South Korea	Lừu Thị Duyên; Vietnam
Middleweight (75 kg)	Jang Un-hui; North Korea	Li Qian; China	Marina Volnova; Kazakhstan
Middleweight (75 kg)	Jang Un-hui; North Korea	Li Qian; China	Pooja Rani; India

== Medal table ==
Rank	Nation	Gold	Silver	Bronze	Total
1	Kazakhstan (KAZ)	6	2	2	10
2	South Korea (KOR)	2	3	1	6
3	China (CHN)	1	2	0	3
4	India (IND)	1	0	4	5
5	Mongolia (MGL)	1	0	1	2
5	Thailand (THA)	1	0	1	2
7	North Korea (PRK)	1	0	0	1
8	Uzbekistan (UZB)	0	2	2	4
9	Iran (IRI)	0	2	1	3
10	Philippines (PHI)	0	1	3	4
11	Jordan (JOR)	0	1	2	3
12	Japan (JPN)	0	0	3	3
13	Turkmenistan (TKM)	0	0	2	2
13	Vietnam (VIE)	0	0	2	2
15	Kyrgyzstan (KGZ)	0	0	1	1
15	Pakistan (PAK)	0	0	1	1
Totals (16 entries)		13	13	26	52

== Participating nations ==
A total of 216 athletes from 34 nations competed in boxing at the 2014 Asian Games:

- Afghanistan (1)
- Bhutan (5)
- China (13)
- Chinese Taipei (6)
- India (13)
- Indonesia (2)
- Iran (6)
- Iraq (5)
- Japan (8)
- Jordan (8)
- Kazakhstan (13)
- Kuwait (6)
- Kyrgyzstan (8)
- Laos (2)
- Lebanon (1)
- Macau (2)
- Malaysia (2)
- Mongolia (12)
- Nepal (9)
- North Korea (7)
- Pakistan (6)
- Palestine (2)
- Philippines (8)
- Qatar (4)
- Saudi Arabia (6)
- South Korea (13)
- Sri Lanka (4)
- Syria (3)
- Tajikistan (7)
- Thailand (9)
- Timor-Leste (2)
- Turkmenistan (7)
- Uzbekistan (13)
- Vietnam (3)
