= Wushu at the 2014 Asian Games – Men's sanda 65 kg =

Men's sanda 65 kg at the 2014 Asian Games
- Venue: Ganghwa Dolmens Gymnasium
- Dates: 20–24 September 2014
- Competitors: 15 from 15 nations

Medalists
gold medal	Mohsen Mohammadseifi	Iran
silver medal	Rishat Livensho	Kazakhstan
bronze medal	Salaheddin Baýramow	Turkmenistan
bronze medal	Chen Hongxing	China

The men's sanda 65 kilograms competition at the 2014 Asian Games in Incheon, South Korea will be held from 20 September to 24 September at the Ganghwa Dolmens Gymnasium.

Sanda is an unsanctioned fight is a Chinese self-defense system and combat sport. Amateur Sanda allows kicks, punches, knees (not to the head), and throws.

A total of 15 men from 15 countries competed in this event, limited to fighters whose body weight was less than 65 kilograms.

Mohsen Mohammadseifi from Iran won the gold medal after beating Rishat Livensho of Kazakhstan in gold medal bout 2–0, Mohammadseifi won both periods by the same score of 5–0.

== Schedule ==
All times are Korea Standard Time (UTC+09:00)

Date	Time	Event
Saturday, 20 September 2014	19:00	Round of 16
Sunday, 21 September 2014	19:00	Round of 16
Monday, 22 September 2014	19:00	Quarterfinals
Tuesday, 23 September 2014	19:00	Semifinals
Wednesday, 24 September 2014	15:00	Final

== Results ==
Legend

- KO — Won by knockout
- TV — Technical victory

Round of 16
Salaheddin Baýramow (TKM)	KO
M. Bimoljit Singh (IND)
Cai Aolong (MAC)	2
Kalanh Khotsombath (LAO)	0
Mahfuz Wafa (AFG)	0
Rishat Livensho (KAZ)	2
Nguyễn Văn Tài (VIE)	2
Jalal Al-Daajeh (JOR)	0
Chen Hongxing (CHN)	2
Park Seung-mo (KOR)	0
Mohsen Mohammadseifi (IRI)	TV
Clemente Tabugara (PHI)
Subanbek Bozhoev (KGZ)	2
Sombir Tamang (NEP)	1

Quarterfinals
Ubaidullah (PAK)	0
Salaheddin Baýramow (TKM)	2
Cai Aolong (MAC)	0
Rishat Livensho (KAZ)	2
Nguyễn Văn Tài (VIE)	1
Chen Hongxing (CHN)	2
Mohsen Mohammadseifi (IRI)	2
Subanbek Bozhoev (KGZ)	0

Semifinals
Salaheddin Baýramow (TKM)	1
Rishat Livensho (KAZ)	2
Chen Hongxing (CHN)	0
Mohsen Mohammadseifi (IRI)	2

Final
Rishat Livensho (KAZ)	0
Mohsen Mohammadseifi (IRI)	2
