= Swimming at the 2014 Asian Games – Women's 100 metre freestyle =

Women's 100 metre freestyle at the 2014 Asian Games
- Venue: Munhak Park Tae-hwan Aquatics Center
- Date: 22 September 2014
- Competitors: 27 from 18 nations

Medalists
gold medal	Shen Duo	China
silver medal	Tang Yi	China
bronze medal	Miki Uchida	Japan

The women's 100 metre freestyle event at the 2014 Asian Games took place on 22 September 2014 at Munhak Park Tae-hwan Aquatics Center.

== Schedule ==
All times are Korea Standard Time (UTC+09:00)

Date	Time	Event
Monday, 22 September 2014	09:00	Heats
Monday, 22 September 2014	19:24	Final

== Records ==
Prior to this competition, the existing world, Asian and Games records were as follows.

World Record	Britta Steffen (GER)	52.07	Rome, Italy	31 July 2009
Asian Record	Pang Jiaying (CHN)	53.13	Jinan, China	22 October 2009
Games Record	Tang Yi (CHN)	54.12	Guangzhou, China	17 November 2010

== Results ==
Legend

- DNS — Did not start

=== Heats ===
Rank	Heat	Athlete	Time	Notes
1	4	Shen Duo (CHN)	55.25	
2	3	Tang Yi (CHN)	55.35	
3	2	Miki Uchida (JPN)	55.48	
4	3	Yayoi Matsumoto (JPN)	56.09	
5	4	Siobhán Haughey (HKG)	56.12	
6	4	Camille Cheng (HKG)	56.68	
7	2	Ko Mi-so (KOR)	56.69	
8	4	Natthanan Junkrajang (THA)	56.73	
9	3	Jasmine Al-Khaldi (PHI)	56.92	
10	2	Elmira Aigaliyeva (KAZ)	57.06	
11	2	Amanda Lim (SIN)	57.12	
12	3	Yang Chin-kuei (TPE)	57.78	
13	2	Sung Hsin-yi (TPE)	57.92	
14	4	Marina Chan (SIN)	58.31	
15	3	Chui Lai Kwan (MAS)	58.78	
16	3	Bayan Jumah (SYR)	58.92	
17	4	Benjaporn Sriphanomthorn (THA)	59.23	
18	2	Tan Chi Yan (MAC)	1:00.19	
19	4	Choi Weng Tong (MAC)	1:01.33	
20	3	Sabine Hazboun (PLE)	1:03.46	
21	2	Areeba Shaikh (PAK)	1:06.52	
22	3	Tsogtgereliin Möngönsor (MGL)	1:07.36	
23	4	Aminath Shajan (MDV)	1:08.58	
24	1	Keýik Weliýewa (TKM)	1:08.77	
25	2	Sofia Shah (NEP)	1:09.29	
26	1	Enkhmandakhyn Nandinzayaa (MGL)	1:13.83	
—	1	Soha Sanjrani (PAK)	DNS	

=== Final ===
Rank	Athlete	Time	Notes
1st place, gold medalist(s)	Shen Duo (CHN)	54.37	
2nd place, silver medalist(s)	Tang Yi (CHN)	54.45	
3rd place, bronze medalist(s)	Miki Uchida (JPN)	54.66	
4	Siobhán Haughey (HKG)	54.94	
5	Yayoi Matsumoto (JPN)	55.97	
6	Camille Cheng (HKG)	56.18	
7	Ko Mi-so (KOR)	56.53	
8	Natthanan Junkrajang (THA)	56.65	
