= Cycling at the 2014 Asian Games – Men's road race =

Asian Games Cycling event

Men's road race at the 2014 Asian Games
- Venue: Songdo Road Cycling Course
- Date: 28 September 2014
- Competitors: 48 from 26 nations

Medalists
gold medal	Jang Kyung-gu	South Korea
silver medal	Arvin Moazzami	Iran
bronze medal	Leung Chun Wing	Hong Kong

The men's 182-kilometre road race competition at the 2014 Asian Games was held on 28 September. Jang Kyung-gu of South Korea, who finished 13th in the previous Asian Games, won the race.

== Schedule ==
All times are Korea Standard Time (UTC+09:00)

Date	Time	Event
Sunday, 28 September 2014	10:00	Final

== Results ==
Legend

- DNF — Did not finish

Rank	Athlete	Time
1st place, gold medalist(s)	Jang Kyung-gu (KOR)	4:07:52
2nd place, silver medalist(s)	Arvin Moazzami (IRI)	4:07:52
3rd place, bronze medalist(s)	Leung Chun Wing (HKG)	4:08:51
4	Yousif Mirza (UAE)	4:08:51
5	Ruslan Tleubayev (KAZ)	4:08:51
6	Zhao Jingbiao (CHN)	4:08:51
7	Takashi Miyazawa (JPN)	4:08:51
8	Wu Po-hung (TPE)	4:08:51
9	Vadim Shaekhov (UZB)	4:08:58
10	Feng Chun-kai (TPE)	4:08:58
11	Loh Sea Keong (MAS)	4:10:47
12	Lê Văn Duẩn (VIE)	4:10:47
13	Ronald Oranza (PHI)	4:10:47
14	Sayed Ahmed Alawi (BRN)	4:13:04
15	Altanzulyn Altansükh (MGL)	4:13:49
16	Park Sung-baek (KOR)	4:14:29
17	Cheung King Lok (HKG)	4:14:29
18	Mehdi Sohrabi (IRI)	4:14:29
19	Tuulkhangain Tögöldör (MGL)	4:15:31
20	Mai Nguyễn Hưng (VIE)	4:15:31
21	Yalmaz Habach (SYR)	4:15:36
22	Ahmed Al-Bardiny (QAT)	4:17:06
23	Iner Jumaýew (TKM)	4:17:06
24	Röwşen Amangeldiýew (TKM)	4:17:06
25	Kok Mun Wa (MAC)	4:17:06
26	Ariya Phounsavath (LAO)	4:17:10
27	Aiman Cahyadi (INA)	4:17:10
28	Mansoor Jawad (BRN)	4:17:10
29	Hari Fitrianto (INA)	4:17:10
30	Badr Mirza (UAE)	4:17:10
31	Fumiyuki Beppu (JPN)	4:17:10
32	Fauzan Ahmad Lutfi (MAS)	4:17:10
33	Mark Galedo (PHI)	4:17:10
34	Ruslan Karimov (UZB)	4:17:10
35	Khalil Al-Rahman (QAT)	4:19:20
36	Tam Chi Hin (MAC)	4:31:03
—	Alexey Lutsenko (KAZ)	DNF
—	Liu Jianpeng (CHN)	DNF
—	Ahmed Al-Shahrani (KSA)	DNF
—	Abdulhadi Al-Ajmi (KUW)	DNF
—	Hashmatullah Tookhi (AFG)	DNF
—	Eugen Wacker (KGZ)	DNF
—	Salah Rabah (LIB)	DNF
—	Nazir Jaser (SYR)	DNF
—	Sultan Assiri (KSA)	DNF
—	Othman Al-Mutairi (KUW)	DNF
—	Zabihullah Qahar (AFG)	DNF
—	Muhammad Shakeel (PAK)	DNF
