= Swimming at the 2014 Asian Games – Women's 50 metre freestyle =

Women's 50 metre freestyle at the 2014 Asian Games
- Venue: Munhak Park Tae-hwan Aquatics Center
- Date: 26 September 2014
- Competitors: 27 from 19 nations

Medalists
gold medal	Chen Xinyi	China
silver medal	Miki Uchida	Japan
bronze medal	Tang Yi	China

The women's 50 metre freestyle event at the 2014 Asian Games took place on 26 September 2014 at Munhak Park Tae-hwan Aquatics Center.

== Schedule ==
All times are Korea Standard Time (UTC+09:00)

Date	Time	Event
Friday, 26 September 2014	09:00	Heats
Friday, 26 September 2014	19:00	Final

== Records ==
Prior to this competition, the existing world, Asian and Games records were as follows.

World Record	Britta Steffen (GER)	23.73	Rome, Italy	2 August 2009
Asian Record	Le Jingyi (CHN)	24.51	Rome, Italy	11 September 1994
Games Record	Li Zhesi (CHN)	24.97	Guangzhou, China	16 November 2010

== Results ==
=== Heats ===
Rank	Heat	Athlete	Time	Notes
1	4	Miki Uchida (JPN)	25.35	
2	4	Chen Xinyi (CHN)	25.37	
3	3	Tang Yi (CHN)	25.58	
4	2	Siobhán Haughey (HKG)	25.72	
5	3	Yayoi Matsumoto (JPN)	25.78	
6	4	Amanda Lim (SIN)	25.81	
7	2	Lee Jae-young (KOR)	25.95	
8	4	Marina Chan (SIN)	26.21	
9	3	Jenjira Srisa-ard (THA)	26.28	
10	2	Elmira Aigaliyeva (KAZ)	26.35	
10	3	Jasmine Al-Khaldi (PHI)	26.35	
12	2	Chui Lai Kwan (MAS)	26.39	
13	2	Lei On Kei (MAC)	26.54	
14	3	Sze Hang Yu (HKG)	26.65	
15	4	Sung Hsin-yi (TPE)	26.88	
16	4	Choi Weng Tong (MAC)	28.13	
17	3	Sabine Hazboun (PLE)	29.28	
18	3	Areeba Shaikh (PAK)	29.55	
19	4	Merjen Saryýewa (TKM)	29.67	
20	1	Hem Thon Vitiny (CAM)	31.18	
21	2	Tsogtgereliin Möngönsor (MGL)	31.35	
22	2	Sofia Shah (NEP)	31.72	
23	3	Salie Al-Atrash (PLE)	32.06	
24	4	Balchindorjiin Enerel (MGL)	32.53	
25	1	Veomany Siriphone (LAO)	33.09	
26	2	Fathimath Zuhura Ismail (MDV)	35.00	
27	1	Aishath Anha Haisham (MDV)	36.53	

=== Final ===
Rank	Athlete	Time	Notes
1st place, gold medalist(s)	Chen Xinyi (CHN)	24.87	GR
2nd place, silver medalist(s)	Miki Uchida (JPN)	25.11	
3rd place, bronze medalist(s)	Tang Yi (CHN)	25.17	
4	Lee Jae-young (KOR)	25.48	
5	Siobhán Haughey (HKG)	25.53	
6	Yayoi Matsumoto (JPN)	25.72	
7	Amanda Lim (SIN)	25.73	
8	Marina Chan (SIN)	25.91	
