= Wushu at the 2014 Asian Games – Men's sanda 75 kg =

Men's sanda 75 kg at the 2014 Asian Games
- Venue: Ganghwa Dolmens Gymnasium
- Dates: 21–24 September 2014
- Competitors: 12 from 12 nations

Medalists
gold medal	Kim Myeong-jin	South Korea
silver medal	Hamid Reza Ladvar	Iran
bronze medal	Nursultan Tursynkulov	Kazakhstan
bronze medal	Ngô Văn Sỹ	Vietnam

The men's sanda 75 kilograms competition at the 2014 Asian Games in Incheon, South Korea was held from 21 September to 24 September at the Ganghwa Dolmens Gymnasium.

Sanda is an unsanctioned fight is a Chinese self-defense system and combat sport. Amateur Sanda allows kicks, punches, knees (not to the head), and throws.

A total of 12 men from 12 countries competed in this event, limited to fighters whose body weight was less than 75 kilograms.

Kim Myeong-jin from South Korea won the gold medal after beating Hamid Reza Ladvar of Iran in gold medal bout 2–1. The bronze medal was shared by Nursultan Tursynkulov from Kazakhstan and Ngô Văn Sỹ of Vietnam. Athletes from Macau, India, Lebanon and Jordan lost in the second round and finished 5th.

== Schedule ==
All times are Korea Standard Time (UTC+09:00)

Date	Time	Event
Sunday, 21 September 2014	19:00	Round of 16
Monday, 22 September 2014	19:00	Quarterfinals
Tuesday, 23 September 2014	19:00	Semifinals
Wednesday, 24 September 2014	15:00	Final

== Results ==
Legend

- KO — Won by knockout
- TV — Technical victory

Round of 16
Nursultan Tursynkulov (KAZ)	2
Ulugbek Toshmatov (KGZ)	0
Hamid Reza Ladvar (IRI)	2
Dhanbir Maharjan (NEP)	0
Ngô Văn Sỹ (VIE)	2
Khairullah Lalzad (AFG)	0
Kemal Sähedow (TKM)	0
Kim Myeong-jin (KOR)	2

Quarterfinals
Loi Soi Kei (MAC)
Nursultan Tursynkulov (KAZ)	TV
Hamid Reza Ladvar (IRI)	2
Jarrah Zeyad (JOR)	1
Rajani Deori (IND)	0
Ngô Văn Sỹ (VIE)	2
Kim Myeong-jin (KOR)	2
Elias El-Rayess (LIB)	0

Semifinals
Nursultan Tursynkulov (KAZ)	0
Hamid Reza Ladvar (IRI)	2
Ngô Văn Sỹ (VIE)
Kim Myeong-jin (KOR)	KO

Final
Hamid Reza Ladvar (IRI)	1
Kim Myeong-jin (KOR)	2
