= Wushu at the 2014 Asian Games – Men's sanda 70 kg =

Men's sanda 70 kg at the 2014 Asian Games
- Venue: Ganghwa Dolmens Gymnasium
- Dates: 21–24 September 2014
- Competitors: 9 from 9 nations

Medalists
gold medal	Zhang Kun	China
silver medal	Yoo Sang-hoon	South Korea
bronze medal	Sajjad Abbasi	Iran
bronze medal	Maratab Ali Shah	Pakistan

The men's sanda 70 kilograms competition at the 2014 Asian Games in Incheon, South Korea was held from 21 September to 24 September at the Ganghwa Dolmens Gymnasium.

A total of nine competitors from nine different countries (NOCs) competed in this event, limited to fighters whose body weight was less than 70 kilograms.

Zhang Kun from China won the gold medal after beating his opponent Yoo Sang-hoon of South Korea in gold medal bout 2–0, Zhang won both periods by the same score of 5–0.

The bronze medal was shared by Sajjad Abbasi from Iran and Maratab Ali Shah from Pakistan. Athletes from Afghanistan, Turkmenistan, Kyrgyzstan and Jordan lost in the second round (quarterfinals) and finished on fifth place. Ruslan Libirov of Kazakhstan was the only athlete losing in the pre-quarterfinal round.

== Schedule ==
All times are Korea Standard Time (UTC+09:00)

Date	Time	Event
Sunday, 21 September 2014	19:00	Round of 16
Monday, 22 September 2014	19:00	Quarterfinals
Tuesday, 23 September 2014	19:00	Semifinals
Wednesday, 24 September 2014	15:00	Final

== Results ==
Legend

- KO — Won by knockout
- TV — Technical victory

Round of 16
Ruslan Libirov (KAZ)	1
Yoo Sang-hoon (KOR)	2

Quarterfinals
Mohammad Salim Zarifi (AFG)
Yoo Sang-hoon (KOR)	KO
Sajjad Abbasi (IRI)	2
Goçmyrat Jumanyýazow (TKM)	0
Maratab Ali Shah (PAK)	2
Nurlanbek Mamataliev (KGZ)	0
Tariq Hamdi (JOR)	0
Zhang Kun (CHN)	2

Semifinals
Yoo Sang-hoon (KOR)	2
Sajjad Abbasi (IRI)	1
Maratab Ali Shah (PAK)
Zhang Kun (CHN)	TV

Final
Yoo Sang-hoon (KOR)	0
Zhang Kun (CHN)	2
