= Swimming at the 2014 Asian Games – Women's 50 metre backstroke =

Women's 50 metre backstroke at the 2014 Asian Games
- Venue: Munhak Park Tae-hwan Aquatics Center
- Date: 23 September 2014
- Competitors: 18 from 13 nations

Medalists
gold medal	Fu Yuanhui	China
silver medal	Yekaterina Rudenko	Kazakhstan
bronze medal	Miyuki Takemura	Japan

The women's 50 metre backstroke was an event at the 2014 Asian Games that was held on 23 September 2014 at Munhak Park Tae-hwan Aquatics Center.

== Schedule ==
All times are Korea Standard Time (UTC+09:00)

Date	Time	Event
Tuesday, 23 September 2014	09:00	Heats
Tuesday, 23 September 2014	19:00	Final

== Records ==
Prior to this competition, the existing world, Asian and Games records were as follows.

World Record	Zhao Jing (CHN)	27.06	Rome, Italy	30 July 2009
Asian Record	Zhao Jing (CHN)	27.06	Rome, Italy	30 July 2009
Games Record	Gao Chang (CHN)	27.45	Guangzhou, China	15 November 2010

== Results ==
=== Heats ===
Rank	Heat	Athlete	Time	Notes
1	3	Fu Yuanhui (CHN)	27.64	
2	2	Yekaterina Rudenko (KAZ)	28.27	
3	2	Cheng Haihua (CHN)	28.73	
4	1	Miyuki Takemura (JPN)	28.82	
5	3	Stephanie Au (HKG)	29.04	
6	2	Park Han-byeol (KOR)	29.08	
7	1	Sayaka Akase (JPN)	29.39	
8	3	Yulduz Kuchkarova (UZB)	29.79	
9	1	Yu Yi-chen (TPE)	29.93	
10	2	Erica Vong (MAC)	30.09	
11	3	Sabrina Kwok (HKG)	30.31	
12	1	Jenjira Srisa-ard (THA)	31.91	
13	1	Saintöriin Nomun (MGL)	34.68	
14	2	Areeba Shaikh (PAK)	35.06	
15	3	Bayaryn Yesüi (MGL)	36.74	
16	3	Salie Al-Atrash (PLE)	38.01	
17	2	Aishath Anha Haisham (MDV)	40.98	
18	1	Fathimath Zuhura Ismail (MDV)	41.79	

=== Final ===
Rank	Athlete	Time	Notes
1st place, gold medalist(s)	Fu Yuanhui (CHN)	27.66	
2nd place, silver medalist(s)	Yekaterina Rudenko (KAZ)	28.04	
3rd place, bronze medalist(s)	Miyuki Takemura (JPN)	28.27	
4	Park Han-byeol (KOR)	28.32	
5	Cheng Haihua (CHN)	28.37	
6	Stephanie Au (HKG)	28.67	
7	Sayaka Akase (JPN)	29.18	
8	Yulduz Kuchkarova (UZB)	29.31	
