= Boxing at the 2014 Asian Games – Men's 75 kg =

Boxing competitions

Men's 75 kg at the 2014 Asian Games
- Venue: Seonhak Gymnasium
- Date: 25 September – 3 October 2014
- Competitors: 18 from 18 nations

Medalists
gold medal	Zhanibek Alimkhanuly	Kazakhstan
silver medal	Odai Al-Hindawi	Jordan
bronze medal	Vikas Krishan Yadav	India
bronze medal	Wilfredo Lopez	Philippines

The men's middleweight (75 kilograms) event at the 2014 Asian Games took place from 25 September to 3 October 2014 at Seonhak Gymnasium, Incheon, South Korea.

== Schedule ==
All times are Korea Standard Time (UTC+09:00)

Date	Time	Event
Thursday, 25 September 2014	14:00	Preliminaries 1
Monday, 29 September 2014	14:00	Preliminaries 2
Tuesday, 30 September 2014	19:00	Quarterfinals
Thursday, 2 October 2014	19:00	Semifinals
Friday, 3 October 2014	14:00	Final

== Results ==
Legend

- DSQ — Won by disqualification
- KO — Won by knockout
- TKOI — Won by technical knockout injury

=== Final ===
Final
Zhanibek Alimkhanuly (KAZ)	3
Odai Al-Hindawi (JOR)	0

=== Top half ===
Preliminaries 1

Preliminaries 2
Navruz Jafoev (TJK)	0
Hurshidbek Normatov (UZB)	3
Vikas Krishan Yadav (IND)	3
Azamat Kanybek Uulu (KGZ)	0
Zhanibek Alimkhanuly (KAZ)	KO
Yang Yu-ting (TPE)
Islam Irshaid (PLE)	0
Sajjad Mehrabi (IRI)	3

Quarterfinals
Hurshidbek Normatov (UZB)	0
Vikas Krishan Yadav (IND)	3
Zhanibek Alimkhanuly (KAZ)	3
Sajjad Mehrabi (IRI)	0

Semifinals
Vikas Krishan Yadav (IND)	1
Zhanibek Alimkhanuly (KAZ)	2

=== Bottom half ===
Preliminaries 1
Aziz Açilow (TKM)	1
Wilfredo Lopez (PHI)	2
Waheed Abdul-Ridha (IRQ)	3
Kim Dae-hwan (KOR)	0

Preliminaries 2
Zhou Di (CHN)	3
Abdulla Al-Hadi (QAT)	0
Ujjar Singh Thapa (NEP)
Odai Al-Hindawi (JOR)	DSQ
Narmandakhyn Shinebayar (MGL)	3
Zaid Al-Mutairi (KUW)	0
Wilfredo Lopez (PHI)	3
Waheed Abdul-Ridha (IRQ)	0

Quarterfinals
Zhou Di (CHN)	0
Odai Al-Hindawi (JOR)	3
Narmandakhyn Shinebayar (MGL)
Wilfredo Lopez (PHI)	TKOI

Semifinals
Odai Al-Hindawi (JOR)	2
Wilfredo Lopez (PHI)	1
