= Wrestling at the 2014 Asian Games – Men's freestyle 86 kg =

Men's freestyle 86 kg at the 2014 Asian Games
- Venue: Dowon Gymnasium
- Date: 29 September 2014
- Competitors: 16 from 16 nations

Medalists
gold medal	Meisam Mostafa-Jokar	Iran
silver medal	Yesbolat Nurzhumbayev	Kazakhstan
bronze medal	Umidjon Ismanov	Uzbekistan
bronze medal	Kim Gwan-uk	South Korea

The men's freestyle 86 kilograms wrestling competition at the 2014 Asian Games in Incheon was held on 29 September 2014 at the Dowon Gymnasium.

== Schedule ==
All times are Korea Standard Time (UTC+09:00)

Date	Time	Event
Monday, 29 September 2014	13:00	1/8 finals
Monday, 29 September 2014	13:00	Quarterfinals
Monday, 29 September 2014	13:00	Semifinals
Monday, 29 September 2014	13:00	Repechages
Monday, 29 September 2014	19:00	Finals

== Results ==
Legend

- F — Won by fall

=== Main bracket ===
1/8 finals
Yesbolat Nurzhumbayev (KAZ)	5^{F}
Umidjon Ismanov (UZB)	8
Phonexay Phachanxay (LAO)	3
Muhammad Inam (PAK)	12^{F}
Fahriansyah (INA)	4
Ýusup Melejaýew (TKM)	6
Bakhodur Kadirov (TJK)	12
Alaa Abusnaina (PLE)	0
Zhang Feng (CHN)	1
Meisam Mostafa-Jokar (IRI)	11
Pawan Kumar (IND)	10
Sumir Kumar Shah (NEP)	0
Methee Tepakam (THA)	0
Pürveegiin Ösökhbaatar (MGL)	11
Kim Gwan-uk (KOR)	9
Shinya Matsumoto (JPN)	0

Quarterfinals
Yesbolat Nurzhumbayev (KAZ)	16
Muhammad Inam (PAK)	5
Ýusup Melejaýew (TKM)	2
Bakhodur Kadirov (TJK)	6
Meisam Mostafa-Jokar (IRI)	10
Pawan Kumar (IND)	0
Pürveegiin Ösökhbaatar (MGL)	6
Kim Gwan-uk (KOR)	10

Semifinals
Yesbolat Nurzhumbayev (KAZ)	14
Bakhodur Kadirov (TJK)	4
Meisam Mostafa-Jokar (IRI)	4
Kim Gwan-uk (KOR)	1

Gold medal
Yesbolat Nurzhumbayev (KAZ)	4
Meisam Mostafa-Jokar (IRI)	14

=== Repechage ===
Repechage
Umidjon Ismanov (UZB)	10
Muhammad Inam (PAK)	0
Zhang Feng (CHN)	4
Pawan Kumar (IND)	1

Bronze medals
Umidjon Ismanov (UZB)	12
Bakhodur Kadirov (TJK)	1
Zhang Feng (CHN)	0
Kim Gwan-uk (KOR)	10

== Final standing ==
Rank	Athlete
1st place, gold medalist(s)	Meisam Mostafa-Jokar (IRI)
2nd place, silver medalist(s)	Yesbolat Nurzhumbayev (KAZ)
3rd place, bronze medalist(s)	Umidjon Ismanov (UZB)
3rd place, bronze medalist(s)	Kim Gwan-uk (KOR)
5	Bakhodur Kadirov (TJK)
5	Zhang Feng (CHN)
7	Muhammad Inam (PAK)
8	Pürveegiin Ösökhbaatar (MGL)
9	Pawan Kumar (IND)
10	Ýusup Melejaýew (TKM)
11	Fahriansyah (INA)
12	Phonexay Phachanxay (LAO)
13	Shinya Matsumoto (JPN)
14	Sumir Kumar Shah (NEP)
15	Methee Tepakam (THA)
16	Alaa Abusnaina (PLE)
