= Swimming at the 2014 Asian Games – Women's 50 metre butterfly =

Women's 50 metre butterfly at the 2014 Asian Games
- Venue: Munhak Park Tae-hwan Aquatics Center
- Date: 22 September 2014
- Competitors: 21 from 14 nations

Medalists
gold medal	Lu Ying	China
silver medal	Tao Li	Singapore
bronze medal	Liu Lan	China

The women's 50 metre butterfly event at the 2014 Asian Games took place on 22 September 2014 at Munhak Park Tae-hwan Aquatics Center.

== Schedule ==
All times are Korea Standard Time (UTC+09:00)

Date	Time	Event
Monday, 22 September 2014	09:00	Heats
Monday, 22 September 2014	19:00	Final

== Records ==
Prior to this competition, the existing world, Asian and Games records were as follows.

World Record	Sarah Sjöström (SWE)	24.43	Borås, Sweden	5 July 2014
Asian Record	Lu Ying (CHN)	25.42	Barcelona, Spain	3 August 2013
Games Record	Tao Li (SIN)	26.10	Guangzhou, China	18 November 2010

== Results ==
Legend

- DNS — Did not start

=== Heats ===
Rank	Heat	Athlete	Time	Notes
1	2	Tao Li (SIN)	26.46	
1	3	Lu Ying (CHN)	26.46	
3	2	Misaki Yamaguchi (JPN)	27.11	
4	3	Sze Hang Yu (HKG)	27.12	
5	3	An Se-hyeon (KOR)	27.16	
6	2	Elmira Aigaliyeva (KAZ)	27.19	
7	1	Liu Lan (CHN)	27.22	
8	1	Hwang Seo-jin (KOR)	27.50	
8	1	Miho Teramura (JPN)	27.50	
10	2	Huang Mei-chien (TPE)	27.86	
11	3	Jenjira Srisa-ard (THA)	27.87	
12	1	Chan Kin Lok (HKG)	27.97	
13	3	Marina Chan (SIN)	27.99	
14	2	Ma Cheok Mei (MAC)	29.81	
15	3	Areeba Shaikh (PAK)	31.52	
16	2	Merjen Saryýewa (TKM)	31.86	
17	1	Tsogtgereliin Möngönsor (MGL)	32.75	
18	1	Veomany Siriphone (LAO)	34.99	
19	2	Balchindorjiin Enerel (MGL)	36.84	
—	1	Sabine Hazboun (PLE)	DNS	
—	3	Simrah Nasir (PAK)	DNS	

=== Swim-off ===
Rank	Athlete	Time	Notes
1	Hwang Seo-jin (KOR)	27.12	
2	Miho Teramura (JPN)	27.62	

=== Final ===
Rank	Athlete	Time	Notes
1st place, gold medalist(s)	Lu Ying (CHN)	25.83	GR
2nd place, silver medalist(s)	Tao Li (SIN)	26.28	
3rd place, bronze medalist(s)	Liu Lan (CHN)	26.72	
4	Misaki Yamaguchi (JPN)	26.76	
5	An Se-hyeon (KOR)	26.96	
6	Elmira Aigaliyeva (KAZ)	27.02	
7	Sze Hang Yu (HKG)	27.18	
8	Hwang Seo-jin (KOR)	27.28	
