= Wushu at the 2014 Asian Games – Men's taijiquan & taijijian =

Men's taijiquan & taijijian at the 2014 Asian Games
- Venue: Ganghwa Dolmens Gymnasium
- Dates: 23 September 2014
- Competitors: 14 from 12 nations

Medalists
gold medal	Chen Zhouli	China
silver medal	Daniel Parantac	Philippines
bronze medal	Nguyễn Thanh Tùng	Vietnam

The men's taijiquan and taijijian all-round competition at the 2014 Asian Games in Incheon, South Korea was held on 23 September at the Ganghwa Dolmens Gymnasium.

== Schedule ==
All times are Korea Standard Time (UTC+09:00)

Date	Time	Event
Tuesday, 23 September 2014	09:00	Taijijian
Tuesday, 23 September 2014	14:00	Taijiquan

== Results ==
Rank	Athlete	Taijijian	Taijiquan	Total
1st place, gold medalist(s)	Chen Zhouli (CHN)	9.77	9.78	19.55
2nd place, silver medalist(s)	Daniel Parantac (PHI)	9.58	9.68	19.26
3rd place, bronze medalist(s)	Nguyễn Thanh Tùng (VIE)	9.62	9.62	19.24
4	Yoshihiro Sekiya (JPN)	9.64	9.54	19.18
5	Lee Yang (MAS)	9.62	9.52	19.14
6	Hsiao Yung-jih (TPE)	9.62	9.52	19.14
7	Kim Dong-yeong (KOR)	9.61	9.52	19.13
8	Lee Tze Yuan (SIN)	9.48	9.48	18.96
9	Nyein Chan Ko Ko (MYA)	9.30	9.65	18.95
10	Jack Loh (MAS)	9.60	9.35	18.95
11	Samuel Tan (SIN)	9.45	9.44	18.89
12	Avedis Seropian (LIB)	9.12	8.55	17.67
13	Yousef Al-Khudhari (YEM)	8.26	8.87	17.13
14	Ang Babu Lama (NEP)	8.20	8.49	16.69
