= Wrestling at the 2014 Asian Games – Men's Greco-Roman 71 kg =

Men's Greco-Roman 71 kg at the 2014 Asian Games
- Venue: Dowon Gymnasium
- Date: 30 September 2014
- Competitors: 9 from 9 nations

Medalists
gold medal	Jung Ji-hyun	South Korea
silver medal	Dilshod Turdiev	Uzbekistan
bronze medal	Saeid Abdevali	Iran
bronze medal	Şermet Permanow	Turkmenistan

The men's Greco-Roman 71 kilograms wrestling competition at the 2014 Asian Games in Incheon was held on 30 September 2014 at the Dowon Gymnasium.

This wrestling competition consisted of a single-elimination tournament, with a repechage used to determine the winner of two bronze medals. The two finalists faced off for gold and silver medals. Each wrestler who lost to one of the two finalists moved into the repechage.

== Schedule ==
All times are Korea Standard Time (UTC+09:00)

Date	Time	Event
Tuesday, 30 September 2014	13:00	1/8 finals
Tuesday, 30 September 2014	13:00	Quarterfinals
Tuesday, 30 September 2014	13:00	Semifinals
Tuesday, 30 September 2014	19:00	Finals

== Results ==
Legend

- F — Won by fall

=== Main bracket ===
1/8 finals
Taha Yaseen (IRQ)	2
Esengeldi Kozhobek Uulu (KGZ)	5^{F}

Quarterfinals
Jung Ji-hyun (KOR)	8
Krishan Kant Yadav (IND)	0
Maxat Yerezhepov (KAZ)	1
Saeid Abdevali (IRI)	4
Dilshod Turdiev (UZB)	10
Şermet Permanow (TKM)	0
Tsutomu Fujimura (JPN)	4
Esengeldi Kozhobek Uulu (KGZ)	0

Semifinals
Jung Ji-hyun (KOR)	9
Saeid Abdevali (IRI)	6
Dilshod Turdiev (UZB)	8
Tsutomu Fujimura (JPN)	0

Gold medal
Jung Ji-hyun (KOR)	9
Dilshod Turdiev (UZB)	0

=== Repechage ===
Bronze medals
Krishan Kant Yadav (IND)	0
Saeid Abdevali (IRI)	6
Şermet Permanow (TKM)	4^{F}
Tsutomu Fujimura (JPN)	6

== Final standing ==
Rank	Athlete
1st place, gold medalist(s)	Jung Ji-hyun (KOR)
2nd place, silver medalist(s)	Dilshod Turdiev (UZB)
3rd place, bronze medalist(s)	Saeid Abdevali (IRI)
3rd place, bronze medalist(s)	Şermet Permanow (TKM)
5	Krishan Kant Yadav (IND)
5	Tsutomu Fujimura (JPN)
7	Esengeldi Kozhobek Uulu (KGZ)
8	Maxat Yerezhepov (KAZ)
9	Taha Yaseen (IRQ)
