= Wushu at the 2014 Asian Games – Women's sanda 60 kg =

Women's sanda 60 kg at the 2014 Asian Games
- Venue: Ganghwa Dolmens Gymnasium
- Dates: 20–24 September 2014
- Competitors: 11 from 11 nations

Medalists
gold medal	Wang Cong	China
silver medal	Kao Yu-chuan	Chinese Taipei
bronze medal	Tân Thị Ly	Vietnam
bronze medal	Jennet Aýnazarowa	Turkmenistan

The women's sanda 60 kilograms competition at the 2014 Asian Games in Incheon, South Korea was held from 20 September to 24 September at the Ganghwa Dolmens Gymnasium.

Sanda is an unsanctioned fight is a Chinese self-defense system and combat sport. Amateur Sanda allows kicks, punches, knees (not to the head), and throws.

A total of eleven competitors from eleven countries competed in this event, limited to fighters whose body weight was less than 60 kilograms.

Wang Cong from China won the gold medal after beating Kao Yu-chuan of Chinese Taipei in gold medal bout 2–0, Wang won both periods by the same score of 5–0. The bronze medal was shared by Tân Thị Ly from Vietnam and Jennet Aýnazarowa of Turkmenistan. Rukhsana Hanif from Pakistan, Shahrbanoo Mansourian from Iran, Song Seon-yeong from South Korea and Chahana Bomjan Lama from Nepal shared the fifth place. Athletes from India, Mongolia and Bangladesh lost in the first round and didn't advance.

== Schedule ==
All times are Korea Standard Time (UTC+09:00)

Date	Time	Event
Saturday, 20 September 2014	19:00	Round of 16
Monday, 22 September 2014	19:00	Quarterfinals
Tuesday, 23 September 2014	19:00	Semifinals
Wednesday, 24 September 2014	15:00	Final

== Results ==
Legend

- TV — Technical victory

Round of 16
Wangkhem Sandhyarani Devi (IND)	0
Tân Thị Ly (VIE)	2
Song Seon-yeong (KOR)	2
Sherin Sultana (BAN)	0
Jennet Aýnazarowa (TKM)	2
Altansükhiin Zuunnast (MGL)	0

Quarterfinals
Rukhsana Hanif (PAK)
Tân Thị Ly (VIE)	TV
Shahrbanoo Mansourian (IRI)	0
Wang Cong (CHN)	2
Kao Yu-chuan (TPE)	2
Song Seon-yeong (KOR)	0
Jennet Aýnazarowa (TKM)	2
Chahana Bomjan Lama (NEP)	0

Semifinals
Tân Thị Ly (VIE)	0
Wang Cong (CHN)	2
Kao Yu-chuan (TPE)	2
Jennet Aýnazarowa (TKM)	0

Final
Wang Cong (CHN)	2
Kao Yu-chuan (TPE)	0
