= Wushu at the 2014 Asian Games – Men's sanda 56 kg =

Men's sanda 56 kg at the 2014 Asian Games
- Venue: Ganghwa Dolmens Gymnasium
- Dates: 20–24 September 2014
- Competitors: 14 from 14 nations

Medalists
gold medal	Zhao Fuxiang	China
silver medal	Bùi Trường Giang	Vietnam
bronze medal	Francisco Solis	Philippines
bronze medal	Khamla Soukaphone	Laos

The men's sanda 56 kilograms competition at the 2014 Asian Games in Incheon, South Korea was held from 20 September to 24 September at the Ganghwa Dolmens Gymnasium.

A total of fourteen competitors from fourteen countries competed in this event, limited to fighters whose body weight was less than 56 kilograms.

Zhao Fuxiang from China won the gold medal after beating Bùi Trường Giang of Vietnam in gold medal bout 2–0, Zhao won both periods by the same score of 5–0. The bronze medal was shared by Francisco Solis from the Philippines and Khamla Soukaphone of Laos. Charygylych Tagangylyjov from Turkmenistan, Railin Rizaidin from Kazakhstan, Wong Ting Hong from Hong Kong and Kyaw Kyaw from Myanmar shared the fifth place.

Athletes from Iran, Pakistan, Malaysia, India, Mongolia and Nepal lost in the first round and didn't advance.

== Schedule ==
All times are Korea Standard Time (UTC+09:00)

Date	Time	Event
Saturday, 20 September 2014	19:00	Round of 16
Monday, 22 September 2014	19:00	Quarterfinals
Tuesday, 23 September 2014	19:00	Semifinals
Wednesday, 24 September 2014	15:00	Final

== Results ==
Legend

- WO — Won by walkover

Round of 16
Zhao Fuxiang (CHN)	2
Akbar Mohammadzadeh (IRI)	0
Francisco Solis (PHI)	2
Shams-ur-Rehman (PAK)	0
Wong Ting Hong (HKG)	2
Lee Wei Loong (MAS)	0
Santosh Kumar (IND)	1
Railin Rizaidin (KAZ)	2
Borkhüügiin Myagmarsüren (MGL)	0
Bùi Trường Giang (VIE)	2
Amar Sunar (NEP)	0
Khamla Soukaphone (LAO)	2

Quarterfinals
Kyaw Kyaw (MYA)	0
Zhao Fuxiang (CHN)	2
Francisco Solis (PHI)	2
Wong Ting Hong (HKG)	0
Railin Rizaidin (KAZ)	0
Bùi Trường Giang (VIE)	2
Khamla Soukaphone (LAO)	2
Çarygylyç Tagangylyjow (TKM)	0

Semifinals
Zhao Fuxiang (CHN)	WO
Francisco Solis (PHI)
Bùi Trường Giang (VIE)	2
Khamla Soukaphone (LAO)	0

Final
Zhao Fuxiang (CHN)	2
Bùi Trường Giang (VIE)	0
