= 2014 Asian Games medal table =

- Iranian wrestler Masoud Esmaeilpour holding up the Iranian flag on the podium at the 2014 Asian Games.
- Location: Incheon, South Korea

Highlights
- Most gold medals: China 151
- Most total medals: China 345
- Medalling NOCs: 37

The 2014 Asian Games, officially known as the XVII Asiad, is the largest sporting event in Asia governed by Olympic Council of Asia (OCA). It was held at Incheon, South Korea between September 19 – October 4, 2014, with 439 events in 36 sports and disciplines set to feature in the Games.

== Medal table ==
* Host nation (South Korea)

Rank	Nation	Gold	Silver	Bronze	Total
1	China	151	109	85	345
2	South Korea*	79	70	79	228
3	Japan	47	77	76	200
4	Kazakhstan	28	23	33	84
5	Iran	21	18	18	57
6	Thailand	12	7	28	47
7	North Korea	11	11	14	36
8	India	11	9	37	57
9	Chinese Taipei	10	18	23	51
10	Qatar	10	0	4	14
11	Uzbekistan	9	14	22	45
12	Bahrain	9	6	4	19
13	Hong Kong	6	12	25	43
14	Malaysia	5	14	14	33
15	Singapore	5	6	14	25
16	Mongolia	5	4	12	21
17	Indonesia	4	5	11	20
18	Kuwait	3	5	4	12
19	Saudi Arabia	3	3	1	7
20	Myanmar	2	1	1	4
21	Vietnam	1	10	25	36
22	Philippines	1	3	11	15
23	Pakistan	1	1	3	5
23	Tajikistan	1	1	3	5
25	Iraq	1	0	3	4
25	United Arab Emirates	1	0	3	4
27	Sri Lanka	1	0	1	2
28	Cambodia	1	0	0	1
29	Macau	0	3	4	7
30	Kyrgyzstan	0	2	4	6
31	Jordan	0	2	2	4
32	Turkmenistan	0	1	5	6
33	Bangladesh	0	1	2	3
33	Laos	0	1	2	3
35	Afghanistan	0	1	1	2
35	Lebanon	0	1	1	2
37	Nepal	0	0	1	1
Totals (37 entries)		439	439	576	1,454

== Changes in medal standings ==
Ruling date	Sport	Event	Nation	Gold	Silver	Bronze	Total
30 September 2014	Wushu	Women's nanquan	Malaysia	–1			–1
30 September 2014	Wushu	Women's nanquan	Indonesia	+1	–1	+1	+1
30 September 2014	Wushu	Women's nanquan	China		+1	–1	0
27 May 2015	Swimming	Men's 100 m freestyle	South Korea		–1		–1
27 May 2015	Swimming	Men's 100 m freestyle	Japan		+1		+1
27 May 2015	Swimming	Men's 200 m freestyle	South Korea			–1	–1
27 May 2015	Swimming	Men's 200 m freestyle	China			+1	+1
27 May 2015	Swimming	Men's 400 m freestyle	South Korea			–1	–1
27 May 2015	Swimming	Men's 400 m freestyle	China			+1	+1
27 May 2015	Swimming	Men's 4 × 100 m freestyle relay	South Korea			–1	–1
27 May 2015	Swimming	Men's 4 × 100 m freestyle relay	Hong Kong			+1	+1
27 May 2015	Swimming	Men's 4 × 200 m freestyle relay	South Korea			–1	–1
27 May 2015	Swimming	Men's 4 × 200 m freestyle relay	Singapore			+1	+1
27 May 2015	Swimming	Men's 4 × 100 m medley relay	South Korea			–1	–1
27 May 2015	Swimming	Men's 4 × 100 m medley relay	Uzbekistan			+1	+1

On 30 September 2014, the Olympic Council of Asia (OCA) announced that Malaysian Tai Cheau Xuen had been stripped of her gold medal in the women's nanquan event after she tested positive for sibutramine. As a result, Indonesian Juwita Niza Wasni was awarded the gold, China's Wei Hong was awarded the silver and Indonesia's Ivana Ardelia Irmanto awarded the bronze.

On 3 October 2014, Chinese athlete Zhang Wenxiu had been stripped of her gold medal in the women's hammer throw after she tested positive for the prohibited substance zeranol, However, on 6 May 2015 the Court of Arbitration for Sport reinstated her gold medal on her appeal after ruling that the zeranol came from contaminated food.

On 27 May 2015, South Korean Park Tae-hwan had been stripped of his six medals after he tested positive for nebido before the games. Park participated in 6 events in the swimming competition, Men’s 4 × 100 m Medley relay Final (3rd place); Men’s 100 m Freestyle Final (2nd place); Men’s 4 × 100 m Freestyle Relay Final (3rd place); Men’s 4 × 200 m Freestyle Relay Final (3rd place); Men’s 200 m Freestyle Final (3rd place), Men’s 400 m Freestyle Final (3rd place).
