= Meisam Mostafa-Jokar =

Iranian wrestler (born 1985)

Meisam Mostafa Jokar
Personal information
- Born: January 25, 1985 (age 41) Malayer, Iran
- Height: 165 cm (5 ft 5 in)
- Weight: 74 kg (163 lb)
Medal record
Men's freestyle wrestling
Representing Iran
World Cup
Gold medal – first place	2015 Los Angeles	86 kg
Gold medal – first place	2014 Los Angeles	86 kg
Silver medal – second place	2011 Makhachkala	84 kg
Asian Games
Gold medal – first place	2014 Incheon	86 kg
Asian Championships
Gold medal – first place	2014 Astana	86 kg
Silver medal – second place	2007 Bishkek	74 kg
Silver medal – second place	2008 Jeju City	74 kg
International Ali Aliyev Cup
Gold medal – first place	2008 Makhachkala	74 kg
International Yaşar Doğo Cup
Silver medal – second place	2008 Ankara	74 kg
Bronze medal – third place	2012 Ankara	84 kg
International ziolkowski Cup
Silver medal – second place	2007 Warsaw	74 kg
International Heydar Aliyev Cup
Silver medal – second place	2008 Baku	74 kg
World University Championship
Gold medal – first place	2012 Kuortane	84 kg

Meisam Mostafa Jokar (Persian: میثم مصطفی جوکار, born January 25, 1985, in Malayer), also known as Meisam Joukar, is a male freestyle wrestler from Iran. He participated in Men's freestyle 74 kg at 2008 Summer Olympics. In the 1/8 of final he lost against Kiril Terziev and was eliminated from the competition.

Meisam won two silver medals and one gold in the Asian Championships. His older brother Masoud Mostafa-Jokar is an Olympic silver medalist.
