= Miki Uchida =

Japanese swimmer (born 1995)

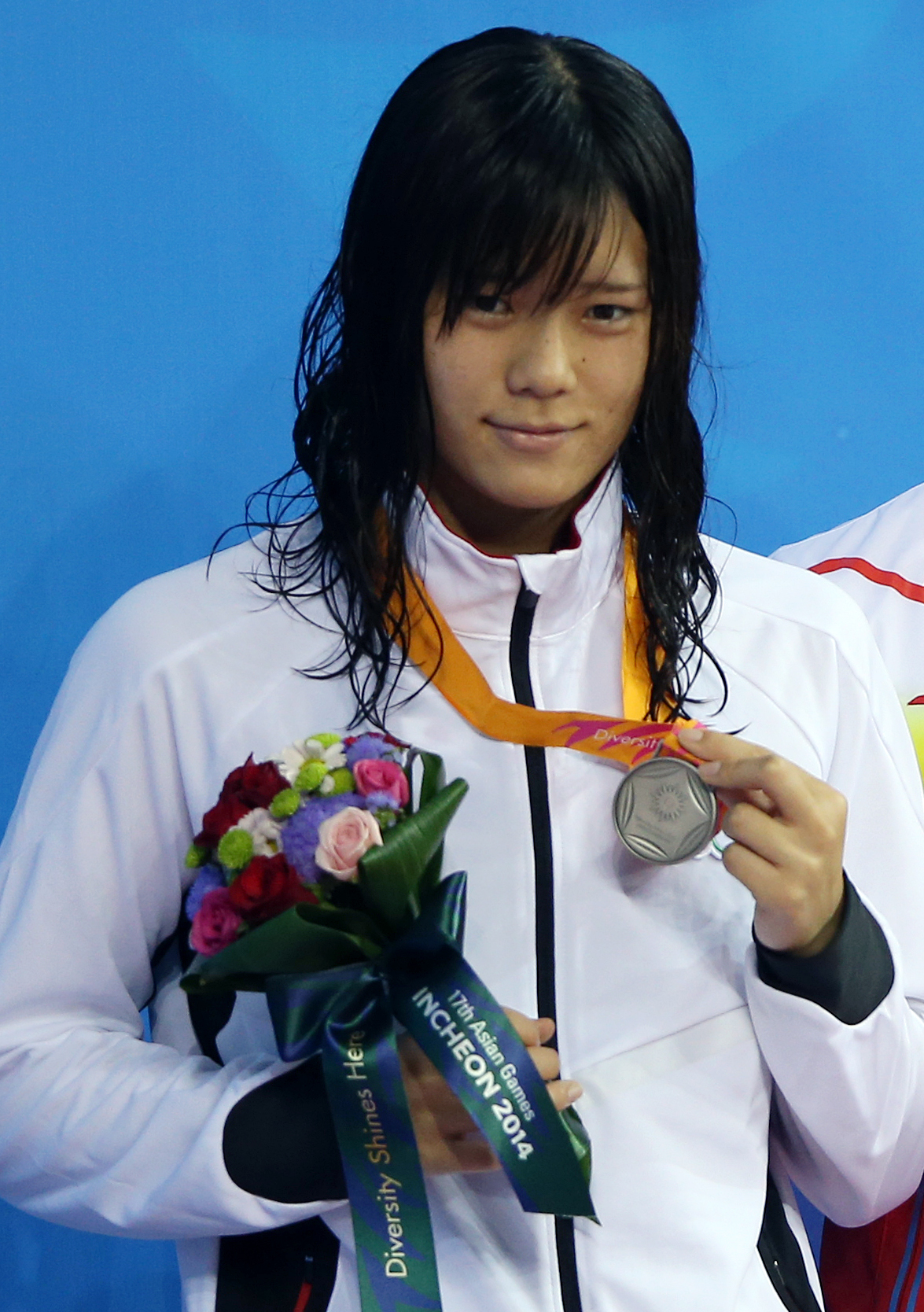

Personal information
- Nationality: Japan
- Born: 21 February 1995 (age 31) Azuma, Gunma, Japan
- Height: 1.70 m (5 ft 7 in)
- Weight: 62 kg (137 lb)

Sport
- Sport: Swimming
- Strokes: Freestyle
Medal record
Women's swimming
Representing Japan
Asian Games
Gold medal – first place	2014 Asian Games	4×100 m medley
Silver medal – second place	2014 Asian Games	4×100 m freestyle
Silver medal – second place	2014 Asian Games	50 m freestyle
Bronze medal – third place	2014 Asian Games	100 m freestyle
World Championships (SC)
Bronze medal – third place	2014 Doha	4×100 m medley
Pan Pacific Championships
Bronze medal – third place	2014 Gold Coast	4×100 m freestyle

Miki Uchida (内田 美希, Uchida Miki; born February 21, 1995 in Azuma, Gunma) is a Japanese swimmer. At the 2012 Summer Olympics, she competed for the national team in the Women's 4 × 100 metre freestyle relay, finishing in 7th place in the final.

At the 2016 Japanese Championships and Olympic trials in April, she broke the national record in the 100-meter freestyle with a time of 53.88.
