= Amin Ghasemipour =

Iranian welterweight boxer

Amin Ghasemipour is an Iranian welterweight boxer who was born in Jirandeh., Iran on September 21, 1985. At the 2012 Summer Olympics, he competed in the Men's welterweight.
