= Chen Zhouli =

Chinese wushu practitioner

Personal information
- Born: November 11, 1989 (age 36) Putian, Fujian, China
- Height: 1.72 m (5 ft 8 in)
- Weight: 70 kg (154 lb)

Sport
- Sport: Wushu
- Event: Taijiquan
- Team: Fujian Wushu Team
Medal record
Representing China
Men's Wushu Taolu
World Championships
Gold medal – first place	2015 Jakarta	Taijiquan
World Cup
Gold medal – first place	2016 Fuzhou	Taijiquan
Asian Games
Gold medal – first place	2014 Incheon	Taijiquan+Taijijian
Gold medal – first place	2018 Jakarta-Palembang	Taijiquan+Taijijian
Asian Championships
Gold medal – first place	2012 Ho Chi Minh City	Taijijian

Chen Zhouli (Chinese: 陈洲理; pinyin: Chénzhōulǐ; born November 11, 1989) is a professional wushu taolu athlete from China. He has won gold medals at the World Wushu Championships, Taolu World Cup, Asian Wushu Championships, and is a two-time gold medalist at the Asian Games the men's taijiquan and taijijian all-round competition. He also won the gold medal in men's taijiquan at the 2017 National Games of China and the silver medal at the 2021 National Games of China.

== See also ==
- List of Asian Games medalists in wushu
- China national wushu team
