= Maratab Ali Shah =

Pakistani wushu practitioner (born 1982)

Medal record

Men's Wushu

Representing Pakistan

Asian Games
Bronze medal – third place	2006 Doha	Sanda (-65kg)
Bronze medal – third place	2014 Incheon	Sanda (-70kg)

Asian Martial Arts Games
Bronze medal – third place	2009 Bangkok	Sanshou (-60kg)

South Asian Games
Gold medal – first place	2006 Colombo	Sanshou (-65kg)
Gold medal – first place	2010 Dhaka	Sanshou (-60kg)

Syed Maratab Ali Shah (25 March 1982) is a two-time Pakistani Asian Games bronze medalist in men's Wushu. He is also a two-time South Asian Games gold medalist.

== Career ==
=== 2006 ===
At the 2006 Asian Games in Doha, Ali won a bronze medal in the Sanshou -65 kg category. At the 10th South Asian Games held in Colombo, he won a gold medal in the same category.

=== 2010 ===
At the 11th South Asian Games held in Dhaka, Bangladesh, Ali won his second successive gold medal. At the 2010 Asian Games, Ali competed in the Sanshou (-60 kg) category and lost by AV to Indian, Bimoljit Singh.

=== 2015 ===
Syed Maratib ali shah opened his very own martial arts (wushu kungfu) club in lahore Pakistan.
