= Dilshod Turdiev =

Uzbekistani Greco-Roman wrestler

Dilshod Turdiev (born 19 October 1991 in Fergana) is an Uzbekistani Greco-Roman wrestler. He competed in the men's Greco-Roman 75 kg event at the 2016 Summer Olympics, in which he was eliminated in the round of 16 by Viktor Nemeš.
