= Afghanistan at the 2014 Asian Games =

- IOC code: AFG
- NOC: Afghanistan National Olympic Committee

in Incheon
- Competitors: 47
- Flag bearer: Mahmood Haidari
- Medals: Gold 0 Silver 1 Bronze 1 Total 2

Asian Games appearances (overview)
- 1951; 1954; 1958; 1962; 1966; 1970; 1974; 1978; 1982; 1986; 1990; 1994; 1998; 2002; 2006; 2010; 2014; 2018; 2022; 2026

Afghanistan participated in the 2014 Asian Games in Incheon, South Korea from 19 September to 4 October 2014. The Afghan contingent comprised 47 competitors.

== Medal summary ==
=== Medalists ===
Medal	Name	Sport	Event
Silver	Hamza Hotak; Nasim Baras; Mohammad Nabi; Mohammad Mujtaba; Gulbadin Naib; Fazal Rahman; Samiullah Shenwari; Qasim Khan; Fareed Ahmad; Hameed Hassan; Mohammad Shahzad; Najib Taraki; Abdullah Adil; Abdullah Mazari; Karim Sadiq	Cricket	Men
Bronze	Ahmad Roman Abasi	Taekwondo	Men's 63 kg

== Athletics ==
=== Men ===
==== Track events ====
Athletes	Event	Performance	
Athletes	Event	Result	Rank
Mohd Sayed Sahel	200 m	21.44	32

=== Women ===
==== Track events ====
Athletes	Event	Performance	
Athletes	Event	Result	Rank
Tahmina Kohistani	200 m	31.08	22

== Badminton ==
=== Men ===
==== Singles ====
Athlete	Event	Round of 32
Athlete	Event	Opposition Result
Ahmad Shekib Iqbal	Singles	Kashyap Parupalli (IND); L 6-21 6-21
Sayed Emran Meri	Singles	Chou Tien-chen (TPE); L 5-21 6-21

==== Doubles ====
Athlete	Event	Round of 32
Athlete	Event	Opposition Result
Ahmad Shekib Iqbal/Sayed Emran Meri	Doubles	Chayut Triyachart (SIN)/ Danny Bawa Chrisnanta (SIN); L 5-21 12-21

== Boxing ==
=== Men ===
Athlete	Event	Round of 32
Athlete	Event	Opposition Result
Mohammad Omid Rahemi	Light Flyweight (49 kg)	Bounphone Lasavongsy (LAO); L 0 - 3

== Cricket ==
=== Squad ===
Afghanistan
- Mohammad Nabi (c)
- Abdullah Adil
- Abdullah Mazari
- Fareed Ahmad
- Nasim Baras
- Hamza Hotak
- Qaseem Khan (wk)
- Mohammad Mujtaba
- Gulbadin Naib
- Fazal Rahman
- Mohammad Shahzad (wk)
- Samiullah Shenwari
- Fazalu Sherin
- Sayed Shirzad
- Najeeb Tarakai

=== Knockout round ===
Quarterfinals
30 September
Hong Kong	130/3
Malaysia	129/7
1 October
Afghanistan	119/9
Nepal	111/7
30 September
Sri Lanka	172/8
South Korea	55
1 October
Bangladesh	224/9
Kuwait	21

Semifinals
2 October
Hong Kong	88/8
Afghanistan	73/2
2 October
Sri Lanka	NR
Bangladesh	59/3

Final
3 October
Afghanistan	65
Sri Lanka	133
Bronze medal match
3 October
Hong Kong	135/7
Bangladesh	162/6

==== Quarterfinal ====
1 October
09:30
Scorecard

Afghanistan; 119/9 (20.0 overs)	v	Nepal; 111/7 (20.0 overs)
Mohammad Shahzad 42 (34); Shakti Gauchan 3/21 (4.0 ov)		Binod Bhandari 48 (40); Fareed Ahmad 4/17 (4.0 ov)

Afghanistan won by 8 runs
Yeonhui Cricket Ground, Incheon
Umpires: Ramani Batumalai and Sarika Prasad

- Nepal won the toss and chose to field

==== Semifinal ====
2 October
09:30
Scorecard

Hong Kong; 88/8 (20.0 overs)	v	Afghanistan; 73/2 (11.3 overs)
Roy Lamsam 17* (20); Karim Sadiq 2/4 (2.0 ov)		Mohammad Shahzad 41* (28); Nadeem Ahmed 1/8 (3.0 ov)

Afghanistan won by 8 wickets (D/L method)
Yeonhui Cricket Ground, Incheon
Umpires: Muhammad Kamruzzman and Buddhi Pradhan

- Afghanistan won the toss and chose to field
- Rain Delay - Target revised to 72 from 15 overs (D/L method).

==== Final ====
3 October
14:00
Scorecard

Afghanistan; 65 (17.4 overs)	v	Sri Lanka; 133 (19.1 overs)
Najeeb Tarakai 17 (16); Jeevan Mendis 3/13 (4.0 ov)		Lahiru Thirimanne 57 (37); Mohammad Nabi 4/18 (3.1 ov)

Sri Lanka won by 68 runs
Yeonhui Cricket Ground, Incheon
Umpires: Buddhi Pradhan and Sarika Prasad

- Sri Lanka won the toss and chose to bat

=== Final standing ===
Rank	Team	Pld	W	L	T	NR
1st place, gold medalist(s)	Sri Lanka	3	2	0	0	1
2nd place, silver medalist(s)	Afghanistan	3	2	1	0	0
3rd place, bronze medalist(s)	Bangladesh	3	2	0	0	1

== Football ==
=== Group B ===
Pos	Team	Pld	W	D	L	GF	GA	GD	Pts
1	Uzbekistan	3	2	1	0	9	1	+8	7
2	Hong Kong	3	2	1	0	5	3	+2	7
3	Bangladesh	3	1	0	2	2	5	−3	3
4	Afghanistan	3	0	0	3	1	8	−7	0

Source: RSSSF
September 15, 2014
17:00

Bangladesh	1–0	Afghanistan
Mamunul Islam 83'	Report^{[usurped]}

Incheon Munhak Stadium
Referee: Vo Minh Tri (Vietnam)

September 18, 2014
17:00

Hong Kong	v	Afghanistan

Ansan Wa~ Stadium
September 22, 2014
17:00

Afghanistan	v	Uzbekistan

Goyang Stadium

== Volleyball ==
=== Beach ===
Athlete	Event	Preliminary round	Standing
Athlete	Event	Opposition Score	Standing
Pardes Safi; Mohammad Zaker Ali Mohammad	Men's	Pool C Dian Putra Santosa - F Fahriansyah (INA); L 0 – 2 (12-21, 18–21); Asanka P. Medagedara Lekamalage – Pubudu Kumara Ekanayaka Ekanayakage (SRI); L 1 – 2 (21-19, 17–21, 10–15); Chen Cheng – Li Jian (CHN); L 0 – 2 (10–21, 8–21)	Not qualified
Edris Meyagul; Habibullah Sadat	Men's	Pool G Kittipat Yungtin – Chutipong Sukarayotin (THA); L 0 – 2 (12-21, 10–21); H A A A Dashti Abdulaziz – A A M Y Bin Eid Yaqoub (KUW); W 2 – 0 (21-11, 21–18) Ade Candra Rachmawan – Koko Prasetyo Darkuncoro (INA); L 0 – 2 (12–21, 11–21)	Not qualified
