= Jordan at the 2014 Asian Games =

- IOC code: JOR
- NOC: Jordan Olympic Committee

in Incheon
- Flag bearer: Sam Daghles
- Medals Ranked 30th: Gold 0 Silver 2 Bronze 2 Total 4

Asian Games appearances (overview)
- 1986; 1990; 1994; 1998; 2002; 2006; 2010; 2014; 2018; 2022; 2026

Jordan participated in the 2014 Asian Games in Incheon, South Korea from 19 September to 4 October 2014. It won 2 silver and 2 bronze medals.

== Medal summary ==
=== Medalists ===
Medal	Name	Sport	Event
Silver	Odai Al-Hindawi	Boxing	Men's 75 kg
Silver	Abdelrahman Al-Masatfa	Karate	Men's kumite 60 kg
Bronze	Obada Al-Kasbeh	Boxing	Men's 60 kg
Bronze	Ihab Al-Matbouli	Boxing	Men's 91 kg

== Football ==
=== Women's tournament ===
Group Stage

Pos	Team	Pld	W	D	L	GF	GA	GD	Pts
1	Japan	3	2	1	0	15	0	+15	7
2	China	3	2	1	0	9	0	+9	7
3	Chinese Taipei	3	0	1	2	2	9	−7	1
4	Jordan	3	0	1	2	2	19	−17	1

Source: RSSSF
15 September
14:00

Jordan	2–2	Chinese Taipei
Al-Naber 45+7'; Jbarah 49'		Lin Ya-han 15'; Wang Hsiang-huei 26'

Namdong Asiad Rugby Field, Incheon
Referee: Shiva Yari (Iran)

18 September
20:00

Japan	12–0	Jordan
Kawasumi 5', 81'; Sugasawa 12', 39', 41'; Sakaguchi 20', 32', 71'; Abu-Kasheh 36' (o.g.); Kira 44', 49'; Miyama 60'

Namdong Asiad Rugby Field, Incheon
Referee: Mai Hoàng Trang (Vietnam)

22 September
20:00

China	5–0	Jordan
Yang Li 10', 13', 26', 42'; Li Dongna 36'

Namdong Asiad Rugby Field, Incheon
Referee: Kim Sook-hee (South Korea)
