= Nepal at the 2014 Asian Games =

- IOC code: NEP
- NOC: Nepal Olympic Committee

in Incheon
- Competitors: 203
- Medals Ranked 33rd: Gold 0 Silver 0 Bronze 1 Total 1

Asian Games appearances (overview)
- 1951; 1954; 1958; 1962; 1966; 1970; 1974; 1978; 1982; 1986; 1990; 1994; 1998; 2002; 2006; 2010; 2014; 2018; 2022; 2026

Nepal participated in the 2014 Asian Games in Incheon, South Korea from 19 September to 4 October 2014. It won one bronze medal during the games.

== Medal table ==
Event	Gold	Silver	Bronze	Total
Karate	0	0	1	1
Total	0	0	1	1

== Medalists ==
Medal	Name	Sport	Event	Date
Bronze	Bimala Tamang	Karate	Women's Single	2 October

== Judo ==
=== Male ===
1. Saroj Maharjan (Extra lightweight)
2. Ramesh Magar (Half lightweight)

=== Female ===
1. Devika Khadka (Half lightweight)

== Karate ==
- Bimala Tamang
