= Chinese Taipei at the 2014 Asian Games =

- IOC code: TPE
- NOC: Chinese Taipei Olympic Committee

in Incheon
- Medals Ranked 9th: Gold 10 Silver 18 Bronze 23 Total 51

Asian Games appearances (overview)
- 1954; 1958; 1962; 1966; 1970; 1974–1986; 1990; 1994; 1998; 2002; 2006; 2010; 2014; 2018; 2022; 2026

Chinese Taipei participated in the 2014 Asian Games in Incheon, South Korea from 19 September to 4 October 2014. Ten gold medals were won in weightlifting, taekwondo, cycling, karate, tennis, bowling, and golf.

== Football ==
=== Women's tournament ===
Group Stage

Pos	Team	Pld	W	D	L	GF	GA	GD	Pts
1	Japan	3	2	1	0	15	0	+15	7
2	China	3	2	1	0	9	0	+9	7
3	Chinese Taipei	3	0	1	2	2	9	−7	1
4	Jordan	3	0	1	2	2	19	−17	1

Source: RSSSF
15 September
14:00

Jordan	2–2	Chinese Taipei
Al-Naber 45+7'; Jbarah 49'		Lin Ya-han 15'; Wang Hsiang-huei 26'

Namdong Asiad Rugby Field, Incheon
Referee: Shiva Yari (Iran)

18 September
14:00

China	4–0	Chinese Taipei
Han Peng 6'; Yang Li 12'; Zhang Rui 37'; Ma Jun 46'

Namdong Asiad Rugby Field, Incheon
Referee: Maria Rebello (India)

22 September
20:00

Chinese Taipei	0–3	Japan
		Sakaguchi 3'; Kira 32'; Kawasumi 85'

Munhak Stadium, Incheon
Referee: Kate Jacewicz (Australia)

Quarter Final

26 September
20:00

South Korea	1–0	Chinese Taipei
Jeon Ga-eul 73'

Munhak Stadium, Incheon
Referee: Fusako Kajiyama (Japan)
