= Kazakhstan at the 2014 Asian Games =

- IOC code: KAZ
- NOC: National Olympic Committee of the Republic of Kazakhstan

in Incheon
- Competitors: 408
- Medals Ranked 4th: Gold 28 Silver 23 Bronze 33 Total 84

Asian Games appearances (overview)
- 1994; 1998; 2002; 2006; 2010; 2014; 2018; 2022; 2026

Kazakhstan participated in the 2014 Asian Games in Incheon, South Korea from 19 September to 4 October 2014.

== Medal summary ==
=== Medal table ===
Sport	Gold	Silver	Bronze	Total	Rank
Athletics	3	1	2	6	5
Beach volleyball	1	0	0	1	2
Boxing	6	2	2	10	1
Canoeing	5	3	2	10	2
Cycling	1	0	0	1	8
Fencing	0	0	2	2	6
Gymnastics	0	0	1	1	8
Handball	0	0	1	1	4
Judo	1	2	3	6	4
Karate	2	3	1	6	3
Rowing	0	1	2	3	6
Rugby sevens	0	0	1	1	4
Shooting	2	0	5	7	3
Swimming	3	2	2	7	3
Taekwondo	0	1	1	2	8
Tennis	1	0	1	2	6
Water polo	1	0	1	2	1
Weightlifting	1	3	0	4	4
Wrestling	1	4	5	10	5
Wushu	0	1	1	2	8
Total	28	23	33	84	4
