= Rugby sevens at the 2010 Asian Games – Women's tournament =

Women at the 2010 Asian Games
- Venue: Guangzhou University Town Stadium
- Date: 21–23 November 2010
- Competitors: 96 from 8 nations

Medalists
| gold medal | Kazakhstan |
| silver medal | China |
| bronze medal | Thailand |

The 2010 Women's Asian Games Rugby sevens Tournament was held in Guangzhou University Town Stadium, Guangzhou, China from November 21 to November 23, 2010.

== Squads ==
| China | Hong Kong | India | Japan |
|---|---|---|---|
| Bai Ying; Guan Qishi; Sun Tingting; Fan Wenjuan; Gao Yan; Liu Yan; Zhao Xinqi; Wang Qianli; Liu Tingting; Pei Jiawen; Sun Shichao; Wang Yue | Samantha Scott; Royce Chan; Christy Cheng; Stephanie Cuvelier; Sham Wai Sum; Chan Ho Ting; Emmy Chan; Cheng Tsz Ting; Lai Pou Fan; Lau Sin Tung; Aggie Poon; Lindsay Varty | Sitara Indramohan; Vahbiz Bharucha; Niharika Bal; Bhagyalaxmi Barik; Neha Pardeshi; Surabhi Date; Tapasi Nandi; Sutapa Das; Kalpana Das; Sheetal Maurya; Annapurna Bothate; Yogita Marathe | Mami Okada; Akari Fujisaki; Rinako Yokoyama; Ayako Tanaka; Ayaka Suzuki; Marie Yamaguchi; Chikami Inoue; Makiko Tomita; Anri Kawano; Misaki Suzuki; Kana Mitsugi; Keiko Kato |
| Kazakhstan | Singapore | South Korea | Thailand |
| Olga Kumanikina; Irina Radzivil; Amina Baratova; Olessya Teryayeva; Olga Sazonova; Nigora Nurmatova; Marianna Balashova; Anna Yakovleva; Svetlana Klyuchnikova; Lyudmila Sherer; Irina Amossova; Irina Adler | Angelina Liu; Amanda Teo; Priscilla Humphries; Sophie Gollifer; Samantha Teo; Wang Shao Ing; Wong Yilin; Eunice Tay; Fong Sei Yin; Derelyn Chua; Tan Hui Juan; Leung Wai Mun | Choi Hye-young; Kim Min-ji; Jeong Ha-ni; Park So-yeon; Lee Min-hui; Min Kyung-jin; Song Jung-eun; Joo Eun-su; Kim Da-heen; Kim Seon-ah; Chae Seong-eun; Kim A-gada | Naritsara Worakitsirikun; Prima Jusom; Tidarat Sawatnam; Aoychai Tummawat; Rungrat Maineiwklang; Piyamat Chomphumee; Chitchanok Yusri; Rasamee Sisongkham; Uthumporn Liamrat; Butsaya Bunrak; Phanthippha Wongwangchan; Jeeraporn Peerabunanon |

== Results ==
All times are China Standard Time (UTC+08:00)

=== Preliminary round ===
==== Pool A ====
| Pos | Team | Pld | W | D | L | PF | PA | PD | Pts | Qualification |
|---|---|---|---|---|---|---|---|---|---|---|
| 1 | China | 3 | 3 | 0 | 0 | 116 | 0 | +116 | 9 | Quarterfinals |
| 2 | Thailand | 3 | 2 | 0 | 1 | 65 | 50 | +15 | 7 | Quarterfinals |
| 3 | Hong Kong | 3 | 1 | 0 | 2 | 50 | 46 | +4 | 5 | Quarterfinals |
| 4 | South Korea | 3 | 0 | 0 | 3 | 0 | 135 | −135 | 3 | Quarterfinals |

Source: Results

21 November
14:30

| China | 51–0 | South Korea |
| Try: Bai (2) 1' m, 10' c Liu T. (2) 4' m, 11' m Liu Y. (2) 5' m, 8' m Zhao 7+' c Guan (2) 12' m, 14+' c Con: Bai (0/2); Liu T. (2/4); Guan (0/1); Zhao (1/1) |

University Town Stadium, Guangzhou
Referee: Gabriel Lee (Hong Kong)

21 November
14:53

| Thailand | 17–14 | Hong Kong |
| Try: Liamrat 3' c Yusri 7' m Maineiwklang 11' m Con: Sawatnam (1/1); Bunrak (0/1) | | Try: Poon 5' c Lai 9' c Con: Lai (2/2) |

University Town Stadium, Guangzhou
Referee: Abdul Rashid Aziz (Singapore)

22 November
11:46

| China | 29–0 | Hong Kong |
| Try: Fan (2) 1' m, 11' c Bai 4' c Liu Y. 6' m Guan 9' m Con: Liu Y. (1/3); Wang Q. (0/1); Fan (1/1) |

University Town Stadium, Guangzhou
Referee: Abdul Rashid Aziz (Singapore)

22 November
12:09

| Thailand | 48–0 | South Korea |
| Try: Sawatnam (2) 1' c, 9' c Maineiwklang 2' c Yusri 4' m Liamrat (2) 7' m, 14'm Worakitsirikun 11' c Chomphumee 13' m Con: Bunrak (3/7); Sawatnam (1/1) |

University Town Stadium, Guangzhou
Referee: Anastassiya Khamova (Kazakhstan)

22 November
15:00

| Hong Kong | 36–0 | South Korea |
| Try: Varty (2) 1' c, 10' m R. Chan 5' m Poon (2) 7+' m, 8' c Cheng T. 14' c Con: Lai (3/5) |

University Town Stadium, Guangzhou
Referee: Liu Hao (China)

22 November
15:23

| China | 36–0 | Thailand |
| Try: Liu Y. (2) 2' m, 9' c Wang Q. 6' c Fan 7' m Bai 10' m Wang Y. 14+' c Con: Liu Y. (0/2); Fan (2/3); Pei (1/1) |

University Town Stadium, Guangzhou
Referee: Scott Herbert (New Zealand)

==== Pool B ====
| Pos | Team | Pld | W | D | L | PF | PA | PD | Pts | Qualification |
|---|---|---|---|---|---|---|---|---|---|---|
| 1 | Kazakhstan | 3 | 3 | 0 | 0 | 100 | 7 | +93 | 9 | Quarterfinals |
| 2 | Japan | 3 | 2 | 0 | 1 | 62 | 33 | +29 | 7 | Quarterfinals |
| 3 | Singapore | 3 | 1 | 0 | 2 | 34 | 53 | −19 | 5 | Quarterfinals |
| 4 | India | 3 | 0 | 0 | 3 | 5 | 108 | −103 | 3 | Quarterfinals |

Source: Results

21 November
16:12

| Kazakhstan | 50–0 | India |
| Try: Sherer (2) 2' m, 4' c Teryayeva (2) 6' c, 12' c Sazonova (3) 8' m, 10' c, 13' c Balashova 14' m Con: Radzivil (5/7); Sazonova (0/1) |

University Town Stadium, Guangzhou
Referee: Chou Wen-liang (Chinese Taipei)

21 November
16:35

| Japan | 19–12 | Singapore |
| Try: Mitsugi 7' c Yamaguchi 12' c Tomita 14' m Con: Mitsugi (1/1); A. Suzuki (1/2) | | Try: Chua 5' c Wang 14+' m Con: Tay (1/1); Wong (0/1) |

University Town Stadium, Guangzhou
Referee: Anastassiya Khamova (Kazakhstan)

22 November
9:46

| Kazakhstan | 29–0 | Singapore |
| Try: Sherer (2) 1' c, 3' m Kumanikina 5' m Yakovleva 7' m Sazonova 14' c Con: Radzivil (2/5) |

University Town Stadium, Guangzhou
Referee: Gabriel Lee (Hong Kong)

22 November
10:09

| Japan | 36–0 | India |
| Try: Yamaguchi 1' m Yokoyama 7' c Fujisaki (2) 8' m, 11' c Kato 14' m Kawano 14+' c Con: Yokoyama (3/6) |

University Town Stadium, Guangzhou
Referee: Azhar Yusof (Singapore)

22 November
13:23

| Singapore | 22–5 | India |
| Try: S. Teo 1' m Wong 2' c Gollifer 6' m Fong 12' m Con: Wong (1/4) | | Try: K. Das 14+' m Con: Date (0/1) |

University Town Stadium, Guangzhou
Referee: Akihisa Aso (Japan)

22 November
13:46

| Kazakhstan | 21–7 | Japan |
| Try: Sherer (2) 7+' c, 11' c Teryayeva 10' c Con: Yakovleva (3/3) | | Try: A. Suzuki 3' c Con: A. Suzuki (1/1) |

University Town Stadium, Guangzhou
Referee: Tobi Lothian (Hong Kong)

=== Final round ===
Quarterfinals
23 November
China | 42
India | 0
23 November
Japan | 14
Hong Kong | 19
23 November
Kazakhstan | 52
South Korea | 0
23 November
Thailand | 27
Singapore | 5

Semifinals
23 November
China | 34
Hong Kong | 0
23 November
Kazakhstan | 22
Thailand | 14

Gold medal match
23 November
China | 14
Kazakhstan | 17
Bronze medal match
23 November
Hong Kong | 12
Thailand (aet) | 17

5–8 placing
23 November
India | 0
Japan | 46
23 November
South Korea | 5
Singapore | 31

5th/6th placing
23 November
Japan | 31
Singapore | 0
7th/8th placing
23 November
India | 21
South Korea | 10

==== Quarterfinals ====
23 November
9:00

| China | 42–0 | India |
| Try: Guan (2) 2' m, 8' m Bai (2) 3' m, 13' m Liu T. 5' m Wang Q. 10' m Fan (2) 11' c, 14+' m Con: Bai (0/1); Liu Y. (0/3); Wang Q. (0/1); Fan (1/1); Pei (0/2) |

University Town Stadium, Guangzhou
Referee: Tobi Lothian (Hong Kong)

23 November
9:23

| Japan | 14–19 | Hong Kong |
| Try: Tomita 2' c Kato 10' c Con: A. Suzuki (2/2) | | Try: Poon (2) 4' c, 12'm Scott 7' c Con: Lai (1/1); Poon (1/2) |

University Town Stadium, Guangzhou
Referee: Azhar Yusof (Singapore)

23 November
9:46

| Kazakhstan | 52–0 | South Korea |
| Try: Adler 1' c Radzivil 2' m Amossova 6' m Teryayeva 7+' c Balashova 8' c Sazonova (2) 11' c, 14+' c Nurmatova 13' c Con: Radzivil (5/5); Yakovleva (0/1); Adler (0/1); Baratova (1/1) |

University Town Stadium, Guangzhou
Referee: Akihisa Aso (Japan)

23 November
10:09

| Thailand | 27–5 | Singapore |
| Try: Bunrak 5' m Wongwangchan 7+' m Liamrat (2) 10' m, 11' c Worakitsirikun 14+' m Con: Sawatnam (1/3); Wongwangchan (0/1); Worakitsirikun (0/1) | | Try: Chua 14' m Con: Tay (0/1) |

University Town Stadium, Guangzhou
Referee: Liu Hao (China)

==== 5–8 placing ====
23 November
12:09

| India | 0–46 | Japan |
| | | Try: Mitsugi (3) 2' m, 6' c, 14' c Okada 4' m Yamaguchi (2) 7+' m, 9' m Tanaka (2) 12' m, 14+' c Con: A. Suzuki (1/3); Yokoyama (2/5) |

University Town Stadium, Guangzhou
Referee: Anastassiya Khamova (Kazakhstan)

23 November
12:32

| South Korea | 5–31 | Singapore |
| Try: Choi 5' m Con: Min (0/1) | | Try: Fong (2) 2' c, 7' c Liu 9' m Tay 11' c Chua 14' m Con: Wong (0/2); Tay (3/3) |

University Town Stadium, Guangzhou
Referee: Chou Wen-liang (Chinese Taipei)

==== Semifinals ====
23 November
12:55

| China | 34–0 | Hong Kong |
| Try: Bai (2) 3' m, 10' m Fan (3) 5' c, 6' m, 8' c Guan 12' m Con: Liu Y. (0/3); Fan (2/2); Bai (0/1) |

University Town Stadium, Guangzhou
Referee: Harry Mason (Singapore)

23 November
13:18

| Kazakhstan | 22–14 | Thailand |
| Try: Sherer (2) 2' m, 12' m Sazonova 4' m Amossova 14+' c Con: Radzivil (1/4) | | Try: Wongwangchan 7' c Sawatnam 10' c Con: Bunrak (2/2) |

University Town Stadium, Guangzhou
Referee: Tobi Lothian (Hong Kong)

==== 7th/8th placing ====
23 November
15:18

| India | 21–10 | South Korea |
| Try: Pardeshi 7' c Maurya 9' c Nandi 14' c Con: Date (2/2); Bharucha (1/1) | | Try: Min 5' m Park 14+' m Con: Chae (0/2) |

University Town Stadium, Guangzhou
Referee: Abdul Rashid Aziz (Singapore)

==== 5th/6th placing ====
23 November
15:41

| Japan | 31–0 | Singapore |
| Try: Yamaguchi (3) 5' m, 6' c, 7+' m Inoue 10' c Tanaka 14' c Con: A. Suzuki (3/5) |

University Town Stadium, Guangzhou
Referee: Alan Whitcombe (Great Britain)

==== Bronze medal match ====
23 November
16:55

| Hong Kong | 12–17 (a.e.t.) | Thailand |
| Try: Poon 5' c Scott 14+' m Con: Poon (1/1) | | Try: Liamrat 2' c Wongwangchan 4' m Sawatnam 16' m Con: Bunrak (1/2) |

University Town Stadium, Guangzhou
Referee: Liu Hao (China)

==== Gold medal match ====
23 November
17:48

| China | 14–17 | Kazakhstan |
| Try: Wang Q. 6' c Gao 15' c Con: Fan (1/1); Gao (1/1) | | Try: Amossova 4' m Sherer 13' c Yakovleva 15' m Con: Radzivil (1/3) |

University Town Stadium, Guangzhou
Referee: Gabriel Lee (Hong Kong)

== Final standing ==
| Rank | Team | Pld | W | D | L |
|---|---|---|---|---|---|
| 1st place, gold medalist(s) | Kazakhstan | 6 | 6 | 0 | 0 |
| 2nd place, silver medalist(s) | China | 6 | 5 | 0 | 1 |
| 3rd place, bronze medalist(s) | Thailand | 6 | 4 | 0 | 2 |
| 4 | Hong Kong | 6 | 2 | 0 | 4 |
| 5 | Japan | 6 | 4 | 0 | 2 |
| 6 | Singapore | 6 | 2 | 0 | 4 |
| 7 | India | 6 | 1 | 0 | 5 |
| 8 | South Korea | 6 | 0 | 0 | 6 |
