= Japan at the 2014 Asian Games =

- IOC code: JPN
- NOC: Japanese Olympic Committee

in Incheon
- Competitors: 718
- Medals Ranked 3rd: Gold 47 Silver 77 Bronze 76 Total 200

Asian Games appearances (overview)
- 1951; 1954; 1958; 1962; 1966; 1970; 1974; 1978; 1982; 1986; 1990; 1994; 1998; 2002; 2006; 2010; 2014; 2018; 2022; 2026

Japan participated in the 2014 Asian Games in Incheon, South Korea from 19 September to 4 October 2014. The nation sent a total of 718 athletes in the games. Japan finished third in the medal table with 47 gold medals, 77 silver medals, and 76 silver medals.

== Medal summary ==
=== Medal table ===
Sport	Gold	Silver	Bronze	Total
Swimming	12	21	13	46
Judo	6	4	5	15
Gymnastics	4	3	5	12
Wrestling	4	3	4	11
Athletics	3	12	7	22
Triathlon	3	2	0	5
Canoeing	3	1	3	7
Karate	3	1	3	7
Cycling	2	3	4	9
Bowling	2	1	0	3
Rowing	1	2	0	3
Fencing	1	1	3	5
Rugby sevens	1	1	0	2
Tennis	1	0	6	7
Softball	1	0	0	1
Equestrian	0	3	2	5
Sailing	0	3	1	4
Synchronized swimming	0	3	0	3
Modern pentathlon	0	2	1	3
Soft tennis	0	2	1	3
Water polo	0	2	0	2
Table tennis	0	1	3	4
Badminton	0	1	1	2
Shooting	0	1	1	2
Taekwondo	0	1	1	2
Football	0	1	0	1
Handball	0	1	0	1
Volleyball	0	1	0	1
Boxing	0	0	3	3
Basketball	0	0	2	2
Sepaktakraw	0	0	2	2
Wushu	0	0	2	2
Archery	0	0	1	1
Baseball	0	0	1	1
Diving	0	0	1	1
Totals (35 entries)	47	77	76	200

=== Medalists ===
Medal	Name	Sport	Event	Date
Gold	Misato Nakamura	Judo	Women's 52 kg	20 September
Gold	Hiroyuki Akimoto	Judo	Men's 73 kg	21 September
Gold	Anzu Yamamoto	Judo	Women's 57 kg	21 September
Gold	Kosuke Hagino	Swimming	Men's 200 metre freestyle	21 September
Gold	Daiya Seto	Swimming	Men's 200 metre butterfly	21 September
Gold	Ryosuke Irie	Swimming	Men's 100 metre backstroke	21 September
Gold	Tomomasa Hasegawa; Yuya Kamoto; Yusuke Saito; Shotaro Shirai; Kazuyuki Takeda; Masayoshi Yamamoto	Gymnastics	Men's artistic team	21 September
Gold	Yuya Yoshida	Judo	Men's 90 kg	22 September
Gold	Takeshi Ojitani	Judo	Men's +100 kg	22 September
Gold	Kosuke Hagino	Swimming	Men's 200 metre individual medley	22 September
Gold	Junya Koga	Swimming	Men's 50 metre backstroke	22 September
Gold	Yuki Kobori; Kosuke Hagino; Daiya Seto; Takeshi Matsuda	Swimming	Men's 4 × 200 metre freestyle relay	22 September
Gold	Kanako Watanabe	Swimming	Women's 200 metre breaststroke	22 September
Gold	Eiya Hashimoto	Cycling	Men's omnium	23 September
Gold	Yuya Kamoto	Gymnastics	Men's artistic individual all-around	23 September
Gold	Misato Nakamura; Emi Yamagishi; Anzu Yamamoto; Kana Abe; Chizuru Arai; Nami Inamori; Mami Umeki	Judo	Women's team	23 September
Gold	Kosuke Hagino	Swimming	Men's 400 metre individual medley	24 September
Gold	Seiichiro Nakagawa	Cycling	Men's sprint	24 September
Gold	Masayoshi Yamamoto	Gymnastics	Men's pommel horse	24 September
Gold	Takahiro Suda; Hideki Omoto	Rowing	Men's lightweight double sculls	24 September
Gold	Ryosuke Irie	Swimming	Men's 200 metre backstroke	25 September
Gold	Satomi Suzuki	Swimming	Women's 50 metre breaststroke	25 September
Gold	Shiho Sakai; Kanako Watanabe; Natsumi Hoshi; Miki Uchida	Swimming	Women's 4 × 100 metre medley relay	25 September
Gold	Toshihiko Takahashi; Yoshinao Masatoki	Bowling	Men's doubles	25 September
Gold	Kenta Chida; Daiki Fujino; Ryo Miyake; Yuki Ota	Fencing	Men's team foil	25 September
Gold	Yuya Kamoto	Gymnastics	Men's parallel bars	25 September
Gold	Yuichi Hosoda	Triathlon	Men's individual	25 September
Gold	Ai Ueda	Triathlon	Women's individual	25 September
Gold	Sayaka Akase	Swimming	Women's 200 metre backstroke	26 September
Gold	Yuka Sato; Hirokatsu Tayama; Ai Ueda; Yuichi Hosoda	Triathlon	Mixed relay	26 September
Gold	Eri Tosaka	Wrestling	Women's freestyle 48 kg	27 September
Gold	Rio Watari	Wrestling	Women's freestyle 63 kg	27 September
Gold	Tomoyuki Sasaki; Shogo Wada; Shusaku Asato	Bowling	Men's trios	28 September
Gold	Saori Yoshida	Wrestling	Women's freestyle 55 kg	28 September
Gold	Momotaro Matsushita; Hiroki Fujishima	Canoeing	Men's K-2 200 metres	29 September
Gold	Yoshihito Nishioka	Tennis	Men's singles	30 September
Gold	Kohei Hasegawa	Wrestling	Men's Greco-Roman 59 kg	30 September
Gold	Keisuke Ushiro	Athletics	Men's decathlon	1 October
Gold	Takayuki Tanii	Athletics	Men's 50 kilometres walk	1 October
Gold	Yuzo Kanemaru; Kenji Fujimitsu; Shōta Iizuka; Nobuya Kato	Athletics	Men's 4 × 400 metres relay	2 October
Gold	Takuya Haneda	Canoeing	Men's slalom C-1	2 October
Gold	Kazuya Adachi	Canoeing	Men's slalom K-1	2 October
Gold	Hiroto Shinohara	Karate	Men's kumite 67 kg	2 October
Gold	Kiyou Shimizu	Karate	Women's individual kata	2 October
Gold	Yusaku Kuwazuru; Shota Hagisawa; Michael Leitch; Lepuha Latuila; Makoto Kato; Masakatsu Hikosaka; Katsuyuki Sakai; Takashi Suzuki; Rakuhei Yamashita; Kazushi Hano; Lomano Lemeki; Masaki Watanabe	Rugby sevens	Men's tournament	2 October
Gold	Nozomi Nagasaki; Yukiyo Mine; Rei Nishiyama; Yuka Ichiguchi; Yu Yamamoto; Haruna Sakamoto; Rie Nagayoshi; Misato Kawano; Misa Okubo; Eri Yamada; Yamato Fujita; Yukiko Ueno; Kana Nakano; Sayuri Yamane; Minami Sato	Softball	Women's tournament	2 October
Gold	Ryutaro Araga	Karate	Men's kumite 84 kg	4 October
Silver	Mayumi Okunishi; Kazuki Sado; Tomoko Nakamura; Shingo Hayashi	Equestrian	Team dressage	20 September
Silver	Tomofumi Takajo	Judo	Men's 66 kg	20 September
Silver	Emi Yamagishi	Judo	Women's 48 kg	20 September
Silver	Chizuru Arai	Judo	Women's 70 kg	20 September
Silver	Yukiko Inui; Hikaru Kazumori; Risako Mitsui	Synchronized swimming	Women's duet	20 September
Silver	Kenta Hirai	Swimming	Men's 200 metre butterfly	21 September
Silver	Kanako Watanabe	Swimming	Women's 100 metre breaststroke	21 September
Silver	Miki Uchida; Misaki Yamaguchi; Kanako Watanabe; Yayoi Matsumoto	Swimming	Women's 4 × 100 metre freestyle relay	21 September
Silver	Nami Inamori	Judo	Women's +78 kg	22 September
Silver	Hiromasa Fujimori	Swimming	Men's 200 metre individual medley	22 September
Silver	Ryosuke Irie	Swimming	Men's 50 metre backstroke	22 September
Silver	Rie Kaneto	Swimming	Women's 200 metre breaststroke	22 September
Silver	Miho Arai; Aika Hakoyama; Yukiko Inui; Mayo Itoyama; Hikaru Kazumori; Kei Marumo; Risako Mitsui; Kanami Nakamaki; Mai Nakamura; Kurumi Yoshida	Synchronized swimming	Women's team	22 September
Silver	Shinri Shioura	Swimming	Men's 50 metre freestyle	23 September
Silver	Kosuke Hagino	Swimming	Men's 400 metre freestyle	23 September
Silver	Kazuki Kohinata	Swimming	Men's 200 metre breaststroke	23 September
Silver	Sakiko Shimizu	Swimming	Women's 400 metre individual medley	23 September
Silver	Chihiro Igarashi; Yasuko Miyamoto; Yayoi Matsumoto; Aya Takano	Swimming	Women's 4 × 200 metre freestyle relay	23 September
Silver	Kazuyasu Minobe; Keisuke Sakamoto; Masaru Yamada	Fencing	Men's team épée	23 September
Silver	Masayoshi Yamamoto	Gymnastics	Men's artistic individual all-around	23 September
Silver	Yukie Nakayama	Shooting	Women's trap	23 September
Silver	Miho Arai; Aika Hakoyama; Yukiko Inui; Mayo Itoyama; Hikaru Kazumori; Kei Marumo; Risako Mitsui; Natsumi Miyazaki; Kanami Nakamaki; Mai Nakamura; Kurumi Yoshida	Synchronized swimming	Women's combination	23 September
Silver	Yasuhiro Koseki	Swimming	Men's 100 metre breaststroke	24 September
Silver	Shinri Shioura; Rammaru Harada; Takuro Fujii; Katsumi Nakamura	Swimming	Men's 4 × 100 metre freestyle relay	24 September
Silver	Chihiro Igarashi	Swimming	Women's 200 metre freestyle	24 September
Silver	Natsumi Hoshi	Swimming	Women's 200 metre butterfly	24 September
Silver	Tomoyuki Kawabata	Cycling	Men's sprint	24 September
Silver	Kazuyuki Takeda	Gymnastics	Men's rings	24 September
Silver	Rikako Miura; Midori Sugiyama; Saki Ogawa; Shino Magariyama; Moe Nakata; Ayaka Takahashi; Yumi Nakano; Misa Shiga; Yumi Kojo; Tsubasa Mori; Erina Kakiichi; Mitsuki Hashiguchi; Yuko Umeda	Water polo	Women's tournament	24 September
Silver	Shinri Shioura	Swimming	Men's 100 metre freestyle	25 September
Silver	Tomoyuki Sasaki; Daisuke Yoshida	Bowling	Men's doubles	25 September
Silver	Kazunari Watanabe	Cycling	Men's keirin	25 September
Silver	Yusuke Saito	Gymnastics	Men's horizontal bar	25 September
Silver	Yu Kataoka; Yusuke Imai; Sumito Nakamura; Baku Hiraki; Mitsuo Nishimura; Kiyotaka Ito; Masato Kobayashi; Kenta Tadachi; Hiroki Sasano	Rowing	Men's eight	25 September
Silver	Eri Wakai; Asumi Suehiro	Rowing	Women's lightweight double sculls	25 September
Silver	Hirokatsu Tayama	Triathlon	Men's individual	25 September
Silver	Juri Ide	Triathlon	Women's individual	25 September
Silver	Kohei Yamamoto	Swimming	Men's 1500 metre freestyle	26 September
Silver	Yasuhiro Koseki	Swimming	Men's 50 metre breaststroke	26 September
Silver	Ryosuke Irie; Yasuhiro Koseki; Hirofumi Ikebata; Shinri Shioura	Swimming	Men's 4 × 100 metre medley relay	26 September
Silver	Miki Uchida	Swimming	Women's 50 metre freestyle	26 September
Silver	Kanako Watanabe	Swimming	Women's 200 metre individual medley	26 September
Silver	Tae Sato; Takanori Kusunoki; Ryuzo Kitajima; Toshiyuki Tanaka	Equestrian	Team eventing	26 September
Silver	Misaki Matsutomo; Ayaka Takahashi	Badminton	Women's doubles	27 September
Silver	Yusuke Suzuki	Athletics	Men's 20 kilometres walk	28 September
Silver	Daichi Sawano	Athletics	Men's pole vault	28 September
Silver	Chisato Fukushima	Athletics	Women's 100 metres	28 September
Silver	Naoya Sakamoto	Canoeing	Men's C-1 200 metres	29 September
Silver	Tomomi Abiko	Athletics	Women's pole vault	30 September
Silver	Satoshi Hirao	Equestrian	Individual jumping	30 September
Silver	Ibuki Koizumi; Kotaro Matsuo	Sailing	Men's 420	30 September
Silver	Kazuto Doi; Kimihiko Imamura	Sailing	Men's 470	30 September
Silver	Manami Doi	Sailing	Laser Radial	30 September
Silver	Ai Fukuhara; Miu Hirano; Sayaka Hirano; Kasumi Ishikawa; Misako Wakamiya	Table tennis	Women's team	30 September
Silver	Tsukasa Tsurumaki	Wrestling	Men's Greco-Roman 80 kg	30 September
Silver	Takayuki Kishimoto	Athletics	Men's 400 metres hurdles	1 October
Silver	Satomi Kubokura	Athletics	Women's 400 metres hurdles	1 October
Silver	Ayumi Kaihori; Saori Ariyoshi; Azusa Iwashimizu; Kana Kitahara; Kana Osafune; Mizuho Sakaguchi; Emi Nakajima; Aya Miyama; Nahomi Kawasumi; Megumi Takase; Chinatsu Kira; Rika Masuya; Yuika Sugasawa; Nanase Kiryu; Rie Usui; Hisui Haza; Hikaru Naomoto; Erina Yamane	Football	Women's tournament	1 October
Silver	Masahiro Sampei	Cycling	Men's BMX race	1 October
Silver	Kimiko Hida; Megumi Honda; Mikako Ishino; Arata Nishikiori; Kaoru Yokoshima; Chie Katsuren; Aya Yokoshima; Yui Sunami; Sato Shiroishi; Yuko Arihama; Mayuko Ishitate; Rino Aizawa; Kaori Fujima; Nozomi Hara; Shiori Nagata; Anri Matsumura	Handball	Women's tournament	1 October
Silver	Mayu Hamada	Taekwondo	Women's 57 kg	1 October
Silver	Katsuyuki Tanamura; Seiya Adachi; Atsushi Arai; Mitsuaki Shiga; Akira Yanase; Yuta Henmi; Yusuke Shimizu; Yuki Kadono; Koji Takei; Kenya Yasuda; Keigo Okawa; Shota Hazui; Tomoyoshi Fukushima	Water polo	Men's tournament	1 October
Silver	Ryūtarō Matsumoto	Wrestling	Men's Greco-Roman 66 kg	1 October
Silver	Takehiro Kanakubo	Wrestling	Men's Greco-Roman 75 kg	1 October
Silver	Suguru Osako	Athletics	Men's 10,000 metres	2 October
Silver	Ryohei Arai	Athletics	Men's javelin throw	2 October
Silver	Ryoko Kizaki	Athletics	Women's marathon	2 October
Silver	Ryota Yamagata; Shōta Iizuka; Shinji Takahira; Kei Takase	Athletics	Men's 4 × 100 metres relay	2 October
Silver	Seika Aoyama; Nanako Matsumoto; Kana Ichikawa; Asami Chiba	Athletics	Women's 4 × 400 metres relay	2 October
Silver	Atsuko Itani; Narumi Kurosu; Rena Shimazu; Shino Yamanaka	Modern pentathlon	Women's team	2 October
Silver	Chiharu Nakamura; Aya Takeuchi; Noriko Taniguchi; Makiko Tomita; Mifuyu Koide; Chisato Yokoo; Keiko Kato; Yuka Kanematsu; Rei Yamada; Marie Yamaguchi; Ano Kuwai; Yoko Suzuki	Rugby sevens	Women's tournament	2 October
Silver	Kohei Matsumura	Athletics	Men's marathon	3 October
Silver	Shinya Fujii; Shohei Iwamoto; Tomoya Miguchi; Yuzuru Okubo	Modern pentathlon	Men's team	3 October
Silver	Kunihiro Shimizu; Shohei Uchiyama; Yu Koshikawa; Ryusuke Tsubakiyama; Masahiro Yanagida; Akihiro Yamauchi; Hideomi Fukatsu; Yūki Ishikawa; Takashi Dekita; Takeshi Nagano; Yuta Yoneyama; Yamato Fushimi	Volleyball	Men's tournament	3 October
Silver	Hideyoshi Kagawa	Karate	Men's kumite +84 kg	4 October
Silver	Takuya Katsura; Koji Kobayashi; Koichi Nagae; Keiya Nakamoto; Hidenori Shinohara	Soft tennis	Men's team	4 October
Silver	Nao Kobayashi; Kana Morihara; Nao Morita; Ayaka Oba; Hikaru Yamashita	Soft tennis	Women's team	4 October
Bronze	Tomoyuki Kawabata; Kazunari Watanabe; Seiichiro Nakagawa	Cycling	Men's team sprint	20 September
Bronze	Toru Shishime	Judo	Men's 60 kg	20 September
Bronze	Daisuke Ichikizaki	Wushu	Men's changquan	20 September
Bronze	Keita Nagashima	Judo	Men's 81 kg	21 September
Bronze	Kana Abe	Judo	Women's 63 kg	21 September
Bronze	Kosuke Hagino	Swimming	Men's 100 metre backstroke	21 September
Bronze	Chihiro Igarashi	Swimming	Women's 400 metre freestyle	21 September
Bronze	Shogo Ichimaru; Kazushige Kuboki; Eiya Hashimoto; Ryo Chikatani	Cycling	Men's team pursuit	21 September
Bronze	Mami Umeki	Judo	Women's 78 kg	22 September
Bronze	Miki Uchida	Swimming	Women's 100 metre freestyle	22 September
Bronze	Yui Hashimoto; Reika Kakiiwa; Miyuki Maeda; Shizuka Matsuo; Misaki Matsutomo; Minatsu Mitani; Mami Naito; Ayaka Takahashi; Sayaka Takahashi; Akane Yamaguchi	Badminton	Women's team	22 September
Bronze	Yuki Ota	Fencing	Men's individual foil	22 September
Bronze	Minami Honda; Azumi Ishikura; Mizuho Nagai; Akiho Sato; Yuriko Yamamoto; Sakura Yumoto	Gymnastics	Women's artistic team	22 September
Bronze	Susumu Teramoto; Seiya Takano; Takeshi Terashima	Sepak takraw	Men's double regu	22 September
Bronze	Yukie Sato; Sawa Aoki; Chiharu Yano	Sepak takraw	Women's double regu	22 September
Bronze	Ai Uchida	Wushu	Women's taijiquan	22 September
Bronze	Tomofumi Takajo; Toru Shishime; Hiroyuki Akimoto; Keita Nagashima; Yuya Yoshida; Yusuke Kumashiro; Takeshi Ojitani	Judo	Men's team	23 September
Bronze	Kenta Ito	Swimming	Men's 50 metre freestyle	23 September
Bronze	Yasuhiro Koseki	Swimming	Men's 200 metre breaststroke	23 September
Bronze	Miyuki Takemura	Swimming	Women's 50 metre backstroke	23 September
Bronze	Daiya Seto	Swimming	Men's 400 metre individual medley	24 September
Bronze	Hirofumi Ikebata	Swimming	Men's 100 metre butterfly	24 September
Bronze	Miyu Nakano	Swimming	Women's 200 metre butterfly	24 September
Bronze	Karin Miyawaki; Shiho Nishioka; Haruka Yanaoka	Fencing	Women's team foil	24 September
Bronze	Yuya Kamoto	Gymnastics	Men's floor	24 September
Bronze	Tatsuma Ito; Yoshihito Nishioka; Yūichi Sugita; Yasutaka Uchiyama	Tennis	Men's team	24 September
Bronze	Misa Eguchi; Eri Hozumi; Risa Ozaki	Tennis	Women's team	24 September
Bronze	Kosuke Hagino	Swimming	Men's 200 metre backstroke	25 September
Bronze	Rammaru Harada	Swimming	Men's 100 metre freestyle	25 September
Bronze	Asami Chida	Swimming	Women's 800 metre freestyle	25 September
Bronze	Rie Ohashi; Ayaka Shimookawa; Ayumi Yamada	Fencing	Women's team épée	25 September
Bronze	Masayoshi Yamamoto	Gymnastics	Men's horizontal bar	25 September
Bronze	Miho Teramura	Swimming	Women's 200 metre individual medley	26 September
Bronze	Yasuhiro Ueyama	Gymnastics	Men's trampoline	26 September
Bronze	Ayano Kishi	Gymnastics	Women's trampoline	26 September
Bronze	Takayuki Matsumoto; Midori Yajima; Toshikazu Yamashita	Shooting	Men's 50 metre rifle three positions team	27 September
Bronze	Takafumi Kojima	Wrestling	Men's freestyle 70 kg	27 September
Bronze	Kei Takase	Athletics	Men's 100 metres	28 September
Bronze	Ren Hayakawa; Yuki Hayashi; Kaori Kawanaka	Archery	Women's team recurve	28 September
Bronze	Takuya Fujishima; Issei Endō; Shun Ishikawa; Masahiro Nishino; Ryota Ishioka; Yuichi Tabata; Ken Tanaka; Toshihiko Kuramoto; Yusuke Ueda; Masataka Iryo; Tetsu Yokota; Takayuki Kato; Tsukasa Komatsu; Koshiro Imamura; Reo Moriyasu; Katsutoshi Satake; Takuaki Iguchi; Ryota Sekiya; Takeshi Kunimoto; Akira Matsumoto; Toshiyuki Hayashi; Shigeki Nakano; Taihei Fukuda; Ryota Ito	Baseball	Men's tournament	28 September
Bronze	Satoshi Hirao; Takashi Utsunomiya; Tadahiro Hayashi; Taizo Sugitani	Equestrian	Team jumping	28 September
Bronze	Seiji Komatsu	Canoeing	Men's K-1 200 metres	29 September
Bronze	Asumi Omura; Shiho Kakizaki	Canoeing	Women's K-2 500 metres	29 September
Bronze	Yuichi Sugita; Shuko Aoyama	Tennis	Mixed doubles	29 September
Bronze	Noriyuki Takatsuka	Wrestling	Men's freestyle 61 kg	29 September
Bronze	Nobuyoshi Arakida	Wrestling	Men's freestyle 125 kg	29 September
Bronze	Kohei Yamamoto	Cycling	Men's cross-country	30 September
Bronze	Yukari Nakagome	Cycling	Women's cross-country	30 September
Bronze	Taizo Sugitani	Equestrian	Individual jumping	30 September
Bronze	Seiya Kishikawa; Kenta Matsudaira; Jun Mizutani; Yuto Muramatsu; Koki Niwa	Table tennis	Men's team	30 September
Bronze	Yūichi Sugita	Tennis	Men's singles	30 September
Bronze	Eri Hozumi	Tennis	Women's singles	30 September
Bronze	Misa Eguchi	Tennis	Women's singles	30 September
Bronze	Norikatsu Saikawa	Wrestling	Men's Greco-Roman 98 kg	30 September
Bronze	Akihiko Nakamura	Athletics	Men's decathlon	1 October
Bronze	Chisato Fukushima	Athletics	Women's 200 metres	1 October
Bronze	Ayako Kimura	Athletics	Women's 100 metres hurdles	1 October
Bronze	Wataru Sakamoto; Daichi Wada; Nobuyuki Imai; Yasuhiro Okamoto	Sailing	Match racing	1 October
Bronze	Ayumi Hagiwara	Athletics	Women's 10,000 metres	2 October
Bronze	Anna Fujimori; Kana Ichikawa; Masumi Aoki; Chisato Fukushima	Athletics	Women's 4 × 100 metres relay	2 October
Bronze	Evelyn Mawuli; Hiromi Suwa; Sanae Motokawa; Mucha Mori; Maya Kawahara; Yuri Ushida; Rui Machida; Naho Miyoshi; Rui Kato; Mikoto Onuma; Aya Watanabe; Sakura Akaho	Basketball	Women's tournament	2 October
Bronze	Shota Hayashida	Boxing	Men's 52 kg	2 October
Bronze	Satoshi Shimizu	Boxing	Men's 60 kg	2 October
Bronze	Masatsugu Kawachi	Boxing	Men's 64 kg	2 October
Bronze	Aki Yazawa	Canoeing	Women's slalom K-1	2 October
Bronze	Sho Sakai	Diving	Men's 3 metre springboard	2 October
Bronze	Issei Shimbaba	Karate	Men's individual kata	2 October
Bronze	Ayumi Uekusa	Karate	Women's kumite +68 kg	2 October
Bronze	Nao Morita; Hikaru Yamashita	Soft tennis	Women's doubles	2 October
Bronze	Yuki Kawauchi	Athletics	Men's marathon	3 October
Bronze	Takumi Ishizaki; Ryumo Ono; Makoto Hiejima; Takatoshi Furukawa; Atsuya Ota; Naoto Tsuji; Kosuke Takeuchi; Daiki Tanaka; Tenketsu Harimoto; Yuki Togashi; Kosuke Kanamaru; Joji Takeuchi	Basketball	Men's tournament	3 October
Bronze	Miki Kobayashi	Karate	Women's kumite 55 kg	3 October
Bronze	Shohei Iwamoto	Modern pentathlon	Men's individual	3 October
Bronze	Koki Niwa; Kenta Matsudaira	Table tennis	Men's doubles	3 October
Bronze	Seiya Kishikawa; Ai Fukuhara	Table tennis	Mixed doubles	3 October
Bronze	Yuma Yamada	Taekwondo	Men's 58 kg	3 October

== Football ==
=== Men's tournament ===
Group D

Pos	Team	Pld	W	D	L	GF	GA	GD	Pts
1	Iraq	3	3	0	0	10	1	+9	9
2	Japan	3	2	0	1	9	4	+5	6
3	Kuwait	3	1	0	2	6	7	−1	3
4	Nepal	3	0	0	3	0	13	−13	0

Source: RSSSF
September 14, 2014
19:30

Japan	4–1	Kuwait
Oshima 43'; Suzuki 50', 84'; Iwanami 74'	Report	Najaf 70'

Incheon Football Stadium
Referee: Ko Hyung-jin (South Korea)

September 17, 2014
20:00

Japan	1–3	Iraq
Nakajima 36'	Report	Tariq 12'; Adnan 47', 72'

Goyang Stadium
Referee: Çarymyrat Gurbanow (Turkmenistan)

September 21, 2014
14:00

Nepal	0-4	Japan
	Report	Notsuda 33'; Nakajima 54'; Suzuki 62', 70'

Goyang Stadium
Referee: Chaiya Mahapab (Thailand)

Round of 16

25 September
17:00

Palestine	0–4	Japan
	Report	Endo 17'; Suzuki 27'; Arano 75'; Harakawa 82'

Hwaseong Stadium, Hwaseong
Referee: Ma Ning (China)

Quarterfinals

28 September
17:00

South Korea	1–0	Japan
Jang Hyun-soo 88' (pen.)	Report

Incheon Munhak Stadium
Referee: Marai Al-Awaji (Saudi Arabia)

=== Women's tournament ===
Group B

Pos	Team	Pld	W	D	L	GF	GA	GD	Pts
1	Japan	3	2	1	0	15	0	+15	7
2	China	3	2	1	0	9	0	+9	7
3	Chinese Taipei	3	0	1	2	2	9	−7	1
4	Jordan	3	0	1	2	2	19	−17	1

Source: RSSSF
15 September
20:00

Japan	0–0	China

Namdong Asiad Rugby Field, Incheon
Referee: Kim Sook-hee (South Korea)

18 September
20:00

Japan	12–0	Jordan
Kawasumi 5', 81'; Sugasawa 12', 39', 41'; Sakaguchi 20', 32', 71'; Abu-Kasheh 36' (o.g.); Kira 44', 49'; Miyama 60'

Namdong Asiad Rugby Field, Incheon
Referee: Mai Hoàng Trang (Vietnam)

22 September
20:00

Chinese Taipei	0–3	Japan
		Sakaguchi 3'; Kira 32'; Kawasumi 85'

Munhak Stadium, Incheon
Referee: Kate Jacewicz (Australia)

Quarterfinals

26 September
20:00

Japan	9–0	Hong Kong
Masuya 3', 26'; He Ying 10' (o.g.); Nakajima 14'; Iwashimizu 49'; Kiryu 60', 81'; Takase 66'; Sugasawa 76'

Hwaseong Stadium, Hwaseong
Referee: Li Juan (China)

Semifinals

29 September
17:00

Japan	3–0	Vietnam
Sakaguchi 24'; Osafune 53'; Sugasawa 74'

Football Stadium, Incheon
Referee: Maria Rebello (India)

Finals

1 October
20:00

North Korea	3–1	Japan
Kim Yun-mi 12'; Ra Un-sim 52'; Ho Un-byol 87'		Miyama 56'

Munhak Stadium, Incheon
Referee: Kate Jacewicz (Australia)

== Handball ==
=== Men's tournament ===
Group D

Pos	Team	Pld	W	D	L	GF	GA	GD	Pts	Qualification
1	South Korea	3	3	0	0	97	57	+40	6	Main round
2	Chinese Taipei	3	2	0	1	84	75	+9	4	Main round
3	Japan	3	1	0	2	99	74	+25	2	Classification round 9–12
4	India	3	0	0	3	51	125	−74	0	Classification 13th–14th

Source: Results

September 20; 14:00	Japan	–	South Korea	Seonhak Handball Gymnasium, Incheon

September 21; 14:00	Chinese Taipei	–	Japan	Seonhak Handball Gymnasium, Incheon

September 22; 20:00	India	–	Japan	Seonhak Handball Gymnasium, Incheon

=== Women's tournament ===
Group B

Pos	Team	Pld	W	D	L	GF	GA	GD	Pts	Qualification
1	Japan	4	4	0	0	190	46	+144	8	Semifinals
2	Kazakhstan	4	3	0	1	153	64	+89	6	Semifinals
3	Uzbekistan	4	2	0	2	121	117	+4	4	Classification 5–8
4	Hong Kong	4	1	0	3	84	107	−23	2	Classification 5–8
5	Maldives	4	0	0	4	19	233	−214	0	

Source: Results

September 20; 18:00	Hong Kong	–	Japan	Suwon Gymnasium, Incheon

September 21; 16:00	Japan	–	Maldives	Suwon Gymnasium, Incheon

September 24; 20:00	Uzbekistan	–	Japan	Suwon Gymnasium, Incheon

September 25; 17:00	Japan	–	Kazakhstan	Suwon Gymnasium, Incheon
