= Japan at the 2010 Asian Games (H–R) =

- IOC code: JPN
- NOC: Japanese Olympic Committee

in Guangzhou
- Competitors: 729 in 42 sports
- Medals Ranked 3rd: Gold 48 Silver 74 Bronze 94 Total 216

Asian Games appearances (overview)
- 1951; 1954; 1958; 1962; 1966; 1970; 1974; 1978; 1982; 1986; 1990; 1994; 1998; 2002; 2006; 2010; 2014; 2018; 2022; 2026

Japan participated in the 2010 Asian Games in Guangzhou, China, on 12–27 November 2010.

== Handball ==
=== Men's tournament ===
Team

Katsuyuki Shinouchi
Kenji Toyoda
Makoto Suematsu
Hideyuki Murakami
Daisuke Miyazaki
Toru Takeda
Satoshi Fujita
Hidenori Kishigawa
Morihide Kaido
Toshihiro Tsubone
Kyosuke Tomita
Jun Mori
Masayuki Matsumura
Yoshiaki Nomura
Tetsuya Kadoyama
Shusaku Higashinagahama

Preliminary round

Group A

Pos	Team	Pld	W	D	L	GF	GA	GD	Pts	Qualification
1	Japan	5	4	0	1	208	123	+85	8	Semifinals
2	Saudi Arabia	5	3	1	1	192	129	+63	7 (Note: Head-to-head result: KSA 32–31 QAT.)	Semifinals
3	Qatar	5	3	1	1	185	134	+51	7	Placement 5th–6th
4	China	5	2	2	1	178	109	+69	6	Placement 7th–8th
5	India	5	1	0	4	153	194	−41	2	Placement 9th–10th
6	Mongolia	5	0	0	5	88	315	−227	0	

Source: Results
Notes:

November 13; 15:45	Japan	27 – 33	Qatar	Huashi Gymnasium, Guangzhou; Referees: Karbaschi, Kolahdouzan (IRI)
November 13; 15:45	Miyazaki 10	(17–17)	Al-Raeiss 13	Huashi Gymnasium, Guangzhou; Referees: Karbaschi, Kolahdouzan (IRI)
November 13; 15:45	3× (yellow card) 5× (suspension)	Report	3× (yellow card) 9× (suspension) 1× (red card)	Huashi Gymnasium, Guangzhou; Referees: Karbaschi, Kolahdouzan (IRI)

November 14; 17:30	Mongolia	14 – 64	Japan	Huashi Gymnasium, Guangzhou; Referees: Liu, Liu (CHN)
November 14; 17:30	Sainkhuu 4	(10–28)	Miyazaki 9	Huashi Gymnasium, Guangzhou; Referees: Liu, Liu (CHN)
November 14; 17:30	3× (yellow card) 3× (suspension)	Report	3× (yellow card) 1× (suspension)	Huashi Gymnasium, Guangzhou; Referees: Liu, Liu (CHN)

November 16; 15:45	China	22 – 27	Japan	Huashi Gymnasium, Guangzhou; Referees: Al-Mutawa, Al-Suwailam (KUW)
November 16; 15:45	Tian J.X. 6	(10–12)	Toyoda 6	Huashi Gymnasium, Guangzhou; Referees: Al-Mutawa, Al-Suwailam (KUW)
November 16; 15:45	3× (yellow card) 4× (suspension)	Report	3× (yellow card) 2× (suspension)	Huashi Gymnasium, Guangzhou; Referees: Al-Mutawa, Al-Suwailam (KUW)

November 18; 17:30	Japan	54 – 26	India	Huashi Gymnasium, Guangzhou; Referees: Mousavian, Taghavi (IRI)
November 18; 17:30	Miyazaki 8	(26–13)	Prasad 10	Huashi Gymnasium, Guangzhou; Referees: Mousavian, Taghavi (IRI)
November 18; 17:30	3× (yellow card) 3× (suspension)	Report	2× (yellow card) 3× (suspension)	Huashi Gymnasium, Guangzhou; Referees: Mousavian, Taghavi (IRI)

November 20; 15:45	Japan	36 – 28	Saudi Arabia	Huashi Gymnasium, Guangzhou; Referees: Ossipov, Porol (KAZ)
November 20; 15:45	Kadoyama 7	(16–14)	Al-Habib 9	Huashi Gymnasium, Guangzhou; Referees: Ossipov, Porol (KAZ)
November 20; 15:45	1× (yellow card) 2× (suspension)	Report	2× (yellow card) 5× (suspension) 1× (red card)	Huashi Gymnasium, Guangzhou; Referees: Ossipov, Porol (KAZ)

Semifinals

November 23; 18:00	Japan	29 – 30	Iran	Huashi Gymnasium, Guangzhou; Referees: Al-Mutawa, Al-Suwailam (KUW)
November 23; 18:00	Toyoda 7	(16–15)	A. Esteki 6	Huashi Gymnasium, Guangzhou; Referees: Al-Mutawa, Al-Suwailam (KUW)
November 23; 18:00	3× (yellow card) 2× (suspension)	Report	3× (yellow card) 5× (suspension)	Huashi Gymnasium, Guangzhou; Referees: Al-Mutawa, Al-Suwailam (KUW)

Bronze medal match

November 26; 18:00	Japan	27 – 20	Saudi Arabia	Huashi Gymnasium, Guangzhou; Referees: Al-Mizili, Al-Mawlani (BHR)
November 26; 18:00	Toyoda 8	(13–10)	Al-Mohsin, Al-Enbaawi 4	Huashi Gymnasium, Guangzhou; Referees: Al-Mizili, Al-Mawlani (BHR)
November 26; 18:00	3× (yellow card) 2× (suspension) 2× (red card)	Report	3× (yellow card) 8× (suspension)	Huashi Gymnasium, Guangzhou; Referees: Al-Mizili, Al-Mawlani (BHR)

=== Women's tournament ===
Team

Megumi Takahashi
Aimi Ito
Akie Uegaki
Akina Shinjo
Kaori Nakamura
Shio Fujii
Kumi Mori
Karina Maki
Hiromi Tashiro
Yuko Arihama
Kaoru Yokoshima
Mayuko Ishitate
Kaori Fujima
Rika Wakamatsu
Aiko Hayafune
Sayo Shiota

Preliminary round

Group B

Pos	Team	Pld	W	D	L	GF	GA	GD	Pts	Qualification
1	China	3	3	0	0	94	49	+45	6	Semifinals
2	Japan	3	2	0	1	82	68	+14	4	Semifinals
3	North Korea	3	1	0	2	90	74	+16	2	Placement 5th–6th
4	India	3	0	0	3	42	117	−75	0	Placement 7th–8th

Source: Results

November 19; 17:15	Japan	31 – 27	North Korea	Guanggong Gymnasium, Guangzhou; Referees: Al-Mutawa, Al-Suwailam (KUW)
November 19; 17:15	Fujii 10	(14–14)	Kwak S.O. 7	Guanggong Gymnasium, Guangzhou; Referees: Al-Mutawa, Al-Suwailam (KUW)
November 19; 17:15	3× (yellow card) 3× (suspension)	Report	3× (yellow card) 3× (suspension)	Guanggong Gymnasium, Guangzhou; Referees: Al-Mutawa, Al-Suwailam (KUW)

November 20; 19:00	Japan	32 – 16	India	Guanggong Gymnasium, Guangzhou; Referees: Al-Mizili, Al-Mawlani (BHR)
November 20; 19:00	Fujii 6	(19–6)	R. Kaur, Patil 4	Guanggong Gymnasium, Guangzhou; Referees: Al-Mizili, Al-Mawlani (BHR)
November 20; 19:00	3× (yellow card) 3× (suspension)	Report	3× (yellow card) 2× (suspension)	Guanggong Gymnasium, Guangzhou; Referees: Al-Mizili, Al-Mawlani (BHR)

November 23; 20:45	Japan	19 – 25	China	Guanggong Gymnasium, Guangzhou; Referees: Al-Mizil, Al-Mawlani (BHR)
November 23; 20:45	Fujii 8	(6–12)	Li W.W. 6	Guanggong Gymnasium, Guangzhou; Referees: Al-Mizil, Al-Mawlani (BHR)
November 23; 20:45	3× (yellow card) 3× (suspension)	Report	2× (yellow card) 5× (suspension)	Guanggong Gymnasium, Guangzhou; Referees: Al-Mizil, Al-Mawlani (BHR)

Semifinals

November 25; 12:00	South Korea	28 – 29	Japan	Guanggong Gymnasium, Guangzhou; Referees: Mousavian, Taghavi (IRI)
November 25; 12:00	Ryu E.H., Moon P.H. 6	(11–15)	Fujii 9	Guanggong Gymnasium, Guangzhou; Referees: Mousavian, Taghavi (IRI)
November 25; 12:00	2× (yellow card) 1× (suspension)	Report	4× (yellow card) 2× (suspension)	Guanggong Gymnasium, Guangzhou; Referees: Mousavian, Taghavi (IRI)

Gold medal match

November 26; 14:15	Japan	22 – 31	China	Guanggong Gymnasium, Guangzhou; Referees: Al-Marzouqi, Al-Nuaimi (UAE)
November 26; 14:15	Fujii 7	(13–14)	Sha Z.W. 8	Guanggong Gymnasium, Guangzhou; Referees: Al-Marzouqi, Al-Nuaimi (UAE)
November 26; 14:15	3× (yellow card) 2× (suspension)	Report	3× (yellow card) 3× (suspension)	Guanggong Gymnasium, Guangzhou; Referees: Al-Marzouqi, Al-Nuaimi (UAE)

== Field hockey ==
=== Men's tournament ===
Team

- Yoshihiro Anai
- Manabu Hatakeyama
- Kei Kawakami
- Koji Kazukawa
- Kenji Kitazato
- Genki Mitani
- Takayasu Mizawa
- Shunsuke Nagaoka
- Katsuyoshi Nagasawa
- Tomonori Ono
- Kazuyuki Ozawa
- Hiroki Sakamoto
- Naoto Shiokawa
- Katsuya Takase
- Kazuhiro Tsubouchi
- Takahiko Yamabori

Preliminary

Group B

Team	Pld	W	D	L	GF	GA	GD	Pts
India	4	4	0	0	22	4	+18	12
Pakistan	4	3	0	1	28	6	+22	9
Japan	4	2	0	2	13	13	0	6
Bangladesh	4	1	0	3	9	21	−12	3
Hong Kong	4	0	0	4	4	32	−28	0

November 15
17:30

Japan	3 – 1	Bangladesh
Yamabori 47'; Nagasawa 56'; Ozawa 69'	Report	Kumar 9'

Aoti Hockey Field 1, Guangzhou
Umpires:
Ilanggo Kanabathu (MAS)
Chen Dekang (CHN)

November 18
19:30

Japan	2 – 8	Pakistan
Kitazato 3'; Tsubouchi 66'	Report	F. Ahmad 4'; Abbas 20', 51'; Rizwan 29'; Waqas 55'; Imran 61'; Abbasi 64'; Zubair 70'

Aoti Hockey Field 1, Guangzhou
Umpires:
Chen Dekang (CHN)
Jang Jung-Min (KOR)

November 20
13:00

Hong Kong	1 – 6	Japan
Arif Ali 46'	Report	Kitazato 18', 61', 70'; Mitani 33'; Sakamoto 44'; Yamabori 63'

Aoti Hockey Field 1, Guangzhou
Umpires:
John Hrytsak (CAN)
Jang Jung-Min (KOR)

November 21
17:30

Japan	2 – 3	India
Sakamoto 21', 63'	Report	Rajpal 31'; Sandeep 38', 62'

Aoti Hockey Field 1, Guangzhou
Umpires:
Kim Hong-Lae (KOR)
Lim Hong Zhen (SIN)

Classification 5th–8th

November 23
14:00

Japan	13 – 1	Oman
Yamabori 2', 3', 31', 42', 66', 69'; Kitazato 8', 23'; Nagasawa 18', 45'; Tsubouchi 20', 35'; Anai 62'	Report	Rajab 36'

Aoti Hockey Field 2, Guangzhou
Umpires:
Jang Jung-Min (KOR)
Lim Hong Zhen (SIN)

Classification 5th–6th

November 25
12:00

China	2 – 0	Japan
Liu Yixian 19'; Na Yubo 65'	Report

Aoti Hockey Field 2, Guangzhou
Umpires:
Simon Taylor (NZL)
Raghu Prasad (IND)

=== Women's tournament ===
Team

Sakiyo Asano
Keiko Miura
Akemi Kato
Ai Murakami
Miyuki Nakagawa
Keiko Manabe
Yukari Yamamoto
Mie Nakashima
Rika Komazawa
Kaori Chiba
Nagisa Hayashi
Mazuki Arai
Kana Nagayama
Mayumi Ono
Aki Mitsuhashi
Shiho Otsuka

Preliminary round

Team	Pld	W	D	L	GF	GA	GD	Pts
China	6	5	1	0	31	4	+27	16
South Korea	6	5	1	0	24	5	+19	16
Japan	6	4	0	2	21	7	+14	12
India	6	3	0	3	24	6	+18	9
Malaysia	6	2	0	4	12	18	−6	6
Thailand	6	1	0	5	5	44	−39	3
Kazakhstan	6	0	0	6	3	36	−33	0

November 13
15:30

Japan	5 – 0 Awarded	Kazakhstan
Murakami 10', 29'; Mitsuhashi 17'; Nakashima 21'	Report	Domashneva 65'

Aoti Hockey Field 1, Guangzhou
Umpires:
Kang Hyun-Young (KOR)
Miskarmalia Mohd Ariffin (SIN)

November 14
17:30

Japan	4 – 2	Malaysia
Chiba 3', 63'; Murakami 12'; Nakagawa 68'	Report	Hasliza 55'; F. Hashim 61'

Aoti Hockey Field 1, Guangzhou
Umpires:
Chen Hong (CHN)
Mercedes Sánchez (ARG)

November 16
13:00

Japan	3 – 0	India
Nakagawa 10'; Chiba 31'; Arai 69'	Report

Aoti Hockey Field 1, Guangzhou
Umpires:
Christiane Hippler (GER)
Miao Lin (CHN)

November 19
15:00

China	3 – 1	Japan
Zhao Yudiao 11', 26'; Gao Lihua 14'	Report	Murakami 53'

Aoti Hockey Field 1, Guangzhou
Umpires:
Christiane Hippler (GER)
Kang Hyun-Young (KOR)

November 20
14:30

Japan	8 – 0	Thailand
Mistsuhashi 20'; Otsuka 32'; Yamamoto 45', 49'; Arai 56'; Murakami 63'; Chiba 68', 69'	Report

Aoti Hockey Field 2, Guangzhou
Umpires:
Nor Piza Hassan (MAS)
Kitty Yau (HKG)

November 22
17:30

South Korea	2 – 0	Japan
Kim Jong-Eun 41', 65'	Report

Aoti Hockey Field 1, Guangzhou
Umpires:
Miao Lin (CHN)
Christiane Hippler (GER)

Bronze medal game

November 24
14:00

Japan	1 – 0 (a.e.t.)	India
Manabe 78'	Report

Aoti Hockey Field 1, Guangzhou
Umpires:
Miao Lin (CHN)
Kang Hyun-Young (KOR)

== Judo ==
=== Men ===
Athlete	Event	Preliminary	Round of 16	Quarterfinals	Final of table	Final
Athlete	Event	Opposition Result	Opposition Result	Opposition Result	Opposition Result	Opposition Result
Hiroaki Hiraoka	-60 kg	Edil Bekkulov (KGZ); W 101-000	Fadi Darwish (SYR); W 100-000	Eisa Majrashi (KSA); W Hantei	Dashdavaagiin Amartuvshin (MGL); W 100-000	Rishod Sobirov (UZB); L 000-120 (silver)
Sanju Irom	-66 kg	BYE	Palitha Phrommala (LAO); W 100-000	Hong Kuk-Hyon (PRK); W 101-000	Kim Joo-Jin (KOR); L 000-100	Bronze medal match: Dastan Ykybayev (KAZ); W 100-000 (bronze)
Hiroyuki Akimoto	-73 kg	BYE	Khalifa Al-Qubaisi (UAE); W 100-000	Azat Kubakaev (KGZ); W 120-000	Navruz Jurakobilov (UZB); W 101-000	Wang Ki-Chun (KOR); W 001-000 (gold)
Masahiro Takamatsu	-81 kg	BYE	Le Khac Nhan (VIE); W 100-000	Islam Bozbayev (KAZ); L 000-100	Final of repechage match: Mohammad Jamali (IRI); W 100-000	Bronze medal match: Otgonbaatariin Uuganbaatar (MGL); W 100-001; (silver) *
Takashi Ono	-90 kg	BYE	Muzafar Iqbal (PAK); W 100-000	Tseng Han Chieh (TPE); W 001-000	Timur Bolat (KAZ); W 100-000	Dilshod Choriev (UZB); W 100-000 (gold)
Takamasa Anai	-100 kg	BYE	Zein Tamra (LIB); W 100-000	Javad Mahjoub (IRI); W 100-000	Mukhamadmurod Abdurakhmonov (TJK); W 101-000	Hwang Hee-Tae (KOR); L 000-100 (silver)
Daiki Kamikawa	+100 kg		Zahid Iqbal (PAK); W 100-000	Iurii Krakovetskii (KGZ); W 100-000	Kim Soo-Whan (KOR); L 000-001	Bronze medal match: Shavkat Igbolov (TJK); W 100-000 (bronze)
Kazuhiko Takahashi	Open		Khaled Al-Araifi (BRN); W 100-000	Khadbaataryn Munkhbaatar (MGL); W 100-000	Ulan Ryskul (KAZ); W 100-000	Mohammad Reza Roudaki (IRI); W 100-000 (gold)

* Shokir Muminov of Uzbekistan originally won the silver medal, but was disqualified after he tested positive for Methylhexanamine. Masahiro Takamatsu and Islam Bozbayev were raised to joint second and took silver medals.

=== Women ===
Athlete	Event	Preliminary	Round of 16	Quarterfinals	Final of table	Final
Athlete	Event	Opposition Result	Opposition Result	Opposition Result	Opposition Result	Opposition Result
Tomoko Fukumi	-48 kg		Leong Siu Pou (MAC); W 101-000	Hwang Ryu-Ok (PRK); W 100-000	Baljinnyamyn Bat-Erdene (MGL); W 001-000	Wu Shugen (CHN); L Hantei (silver)
Misato Nakamura	-52 kg		BYE	Sureerat Sadmaroeng (THA); W 120-000	An Kum-Ae (PRK); W Hantei	Mönkhbaataryn Bundmaa (MGL); W 012-000 (gold)
Kaori Matsumoto	-57 kg	BYE	Ranju Rai (NEP); W 100-000	Alina Ten (KAZ); W 100-000	Rim Yun-Hui (PRK); W 001-000	Kim Jan-Di (KOR); W 001-000 (gold)
Yoshie Ueno	-63 kg		Zhanar Zhanzunova (KAZ); W 100-000	Garima Chaudhary (IND); W 100-000	Kim Su-Gyong (PRK); W Hantei	Wang Chin-fang (TPE); W 101-000 (gold)
Mina Watanabe	-70 kg		BYE	Sol Kyong (PRK); L 001-100	Final of repechage match: Nasiba Surkiyeva (TKM); W 100-010	Bronze medal match: Chen Fei (CHN); L 000-001
Akari Ogata	-78 kg			Tran Thuy Duy (VIE); W 102-000	Galiya Ulmentayeva (KAZ); W 111-000	Jeong Gyeong-Mi (KOR); L 000-100 (silver)
Mika Sugimoto	+78 kg			Thonthan Bunduang (THA); W 120-000	Kim Na-Young (KOR); W 002-001	Qin Qian (CHN); W Hantei (gold)
Megumi Tachimoto	Open		BYE	Liu Huanyuan (CHN); L 000-100	Final of repechage match: Sol Kyong (PRK); W 100-000	Bronze medal match: Thonthan Bunduang (THA); W 100-000 (bronze)

== Kabaddi ==
=== Men's tournament ===
Team

Kokei Ito
Yoji Kawai
Ryokei Kushige
Kazuaki Murakami
Ryota Nakajima
Taiki Nama
Terukazu Nitta
Masayuki Ohta
Masayuki Shimokawa
Hiromi Takahashi
Kazuhiro Takano
Yudai Yamagishi

Preliminary round

Group B

Team	Pld	W	D	L	PF	PA	PD	Pts
Pakistan	3	3	0	0	115	53	+62	6
Japan	3	2	0	1	74	58	+16	4
Bangladesh	3	1	0	2	76	89	−13	2
Malaysia	3	0	0	3	82	147	−65	0

November 22; 17:00	Bangladesh	13 – 15	Japan	Nansha Gymnasium, Guangzhou
November 22; 17:00		(5–6)		Nansha Gymnasium, Guangzhou

November 23; 11:00	Pakistan	28 – 11	Japan	Nansha Gymnasium, Guangzhou
November 23; 11:00		(16–7)		Nansha Gymnasium, Guangzhou

November 24; 17:00	Malaysia	17 – 48	Japan	Nansha Gymnasium, Guangzhou
November 24; 17:00		(7–26)		Nansha Gymnasium, Guangzhou

Semifinals

November 25; 10:00	India	52 – 17	Japan	Nansha Gymnasium, Guangzhou
November 25; 10:00		(26–5)		Nansha Gymnasium, Guangzhou

== Karate ==
=== Men ===
Athlete	Event	1/16 Finals	1/8 Finals	Quarterfinals	Semifinals	Finals
Athlete	Event	Opposition Result	Opposition Result	Opposition Result	Opposition Result	Opposition Result
Itaru Oki	Individual Kata		Noel Espinosa (PHI); W 5-0	Wong Hong Neng (MAC); W 5-0	Yousef Al-Harbi (KUW); W 4-1	Ku Jin Keat (MAS); L 2-3 (silver)
Shinji Nagaki	Kumite -67kg	Lim Yoke Wai (MAS); W 1-0	Pang Iat Long (MAC); W 7-5	Abdullah Al-Otaibi (KUW); L 1-3	Repechage 2 match: Woraphol Kueapo (THA); W 8-0	Bronze medal match: Lee Ji-Hwan (KOR); L 0-4
Ko Matsuhisa	Kumite -75kg	BYE	Mainuddin Hj Mohammad (BRU); L DSQ	did not advance		
Ryutaro Araga	Kumite -84kg	BYE	Ahmed Al-Raee (PLE); W 6-1	Yen Tzu-yao (TPE); W 2-0	Xu Xiangwu (CHN); W 2-1	Jasem Vishgahi (IRI); L 2-6 (silver)

=== Women ===
Athlete	Event	1/8 Finals	Quarterfinals	Semifinals	Finals
Athlete	Event	Opposition Result	Opposition Result	Opposition Result	Opposition Result
Rika Usami	Individual Kata	Roji Nagarkoti (NEP); W 5-0	Lim Lee Lee (MAS); W 5-0	Dewi Yulianti (INA); W 5-0	Huang Yu-chi (TPE); W 5-0 (gold)
Miki Kobayashi	Kumite -55kg	BYE	Fatemeh Chalaki (IRI); W 3-0	Marna Pabillore (PHI); W 1-0	Le Bich Phuong (VIE); L 3-4 (silver)
Yu Miyamoto	Kumite -61kg	Daria Dmitrichenko (KGZ); W 3-0	Zuhriia Mshenesh (PLE); W 8-0	Barno Mirzaeva (UZB); W 8-0	Yamini Gopalasamy (MAS); W 7-0 (gold)
Emiko Honma	Kumite -68kg	BYE	Samira Malekipour (IRI); W 2-0	Yulanda Asmuruf (INA); W 3-1	Feng Lanlan (CHN); L 0-3 (silver)

== Modern pentathlon ==
=== Men ===
Athlete	Event	Fencing			Swimming			Riding			Combined			Total Points	Final Rank
Athlete	Event	Results	Rank	MP Points	Time	Rank	MP Points	Penalties	Rank	MP Points	Time	Rank	MP Points	Total Points	Final Rank
Shinichi Tomii	Individual	20 V - 12 D	5th	932	2:01.09	2nd	1348	78.98	5th	1176	12:13.96	12th	2068	5524	6th
Hayato Noguchi	Individual	23 V - 9 D	2nd	1028	2:02.13	4th	1336	90.43	7th	1148	12:38.42	14th	1968	5480	7th
Tomoya Miguchi	Individual	15 V - 17 D	9th	804	2:01.91	3rd	1340	87.58	11th	1100	11:40.02	5th	2200	5444	8th
Shinya Fujii	Individual	13 V - 9 D	11th	748	2:03.33	8th	1320	84.89	13th	992	11:53.03	11th	2148	5208	13th
Shinichi Tomii; Hayato Noguchi; Tomoya Miguchi; Shinya Fujii	Team		2nd	3512		1st	5344		2nd	4416		3rd	8384	21656	3rd place, bronze medalist(s)

=== Women ===
Athlete	Event	Fencing			Swimming			Riding			Combined			Total Points	Final Rank
Athlete	Event	Results	Rank	MP Points	Time	Rank	MP Points	Penalties	Rank	MP Points	Time	Rank	MP Points	Total Points	Final Rank
Narumi Kurosu	Individual	15 V - 15 D	5th	832	2:19.55	5th	1128	86.11	6th	1104	14:00.62	6th	1640	4704	6th
Hitomi Seki	Individual	14 V - 16 D	9th	804	2:22.71	9th	1088	125.76	11th	888	15:34.44	11th	1264	4044	12th

== Roller sports ==
=== Women ===
Athlete	Event	Qualification		Final	
Athlete	Event	Result	Rank	Result	Rank
Nachi Shinozuka	Women's 300 m time trial			DNS	
Nachi Shinozuka	Women's 10,000 m Points + Elimination			3	5th

=== Artistic ===
Athlete	Event	Short Program		Long Program		Total	
Athlete	Event	Result	Rank	Result	Rank	Result	Rank
Shingo Nishiki	Men's Free skating	84.9	1st	253.8	1st	338.7	1st place, gold medalist(s)

== Rowing ==
Men

Athlete	Event	Heats		Repechage		Final	
Athlete	Event	Time	Rank	Time	Rank	Time	Rank
Daisaku Takeda	Lightweight Single Sculls	7:00.97	1st F	auto advancement		7:00.43	2nd place, silver medalist(s)
Kenta Tadachi; Kenta Kotani	Lightweight Double Sculls	6:39.74	2nd R	6:40.17	1st F	6:35.95	3rd place, bronze medalist(s)
Yu Kataoka; Hideki Omoto; Yoshinori Sato; Takahiro Suda	Lightweight Coxless Four	6:14.70	1st F	auto advancement		6:10.14	1st place, gold medalist(s)

Women

Athlete	Event	Heats		Repechage		Final	
Athlete	Event	Time	Rank	Time	Rank	Time	Rank
Eri Wakai	Lightweight Single Sculls	7:52.13	1st F	auto advancement		7:51.37	1st place, gold medalist(s)
Akiko Iwamoto; Atsumi Fukumoto	Lightweight Double Sculls	7:19.09	2nd R	7:14.59	1st F	7:18.13	2nd place, silver medalist(s)

== Rugby ==
=== Men's tournament ===
Team

Koji Wada
Yasunori Nagatomo
Masahiro Tsuiki
Kotaro Watanabe
Yuta Imamura
Shuetsu Narita
Hiraku Tomoigawa
Takehisa Usuzuki
Tomohiro Semba
Kenji Shomen
Takayuki Yamauchi
Tomoki Kitagawa

Preliminary round

Pool A

Team	Pld	W	D	L	PF	PA	PD	Pts
Japan	4	4	0	0	136	12	+124	12
Hong Kong	4	3	0	1	128	39	+89	10
Malaysia	4	2	0	2	68	76	−8	8
Thailand	4	1	0	3	76	86	−10	6
Mongolia	4	0	0	4	0	195	−195	4

November 21
15:21

Japan	55 – 0	Mongolia
Try: Wada (2) 2' m, 3' c Nagatomo 5' m Shomen 7' m Semba 8' c Kitagawa (3) 11' m, 14' c, 14' c Tomoigawa 13' c Con: Shomen (5/9)

University City Stadium, Guangzhou
Referee: Alan Whitcombe (Great Britain)

November 22
9:00

Japan	24 – 0	Malaysia
Try: Usuzuki 2' m Narita (2) 6' c, 8' c Kitagawa 14' m Con: Shomen (2/3)

University City Stadium, Guangzhou
Referee: Harry Mason (Singapore)

November 22
12:37

Japan	33 – 5	Thailand
Try: Shomen 2' c Tomoigawa 3' c Wada 5' m Yamauchi 9' c Nagatomo 13' c Con: Shomen (2/3); Yamauchi (1/1); Nagatomo (1/1)		Try: Yingcharoen 8' m

University City Stadium, Guangzhou
Referee: Scott Herbert (New Zealand)

November 22
16:09

Japan	24 – 7	Hong Kong
Try: Imamura (2) 2' m, 10' m Wada 7' c Tsuiki 9' c Con: Shomen (2/4)		Try: Robertson 12' c Con: Robertson (1/1)

University City Stadium, Guangzhou
Referee: Azhar Yusof (Singapore)

Quarterfinals

November 23
10:37

Japan	26 – 5	India
Try: Kitagawa 3' m Imamura (2) 10' c, 12' c Narita 14' c Con: Kitagawa (3/3)		Try: Pendse 7' m

University City Stadium, Guangzhou
Referee: Harry Mason (Singapore)

Semifinals

November 23
14:32

Japan	28 – 15	South Korea
Try: Wada (2) 2' c, 14' c Tsuiki (2) 6' c, 9' c Con: Shomen (4/4)		Try: Youn K.W. 7' m Kim W.Y. 11' m Kim H.S. 11' m

University City Stadium, Guangzhou
Referee: Scott Herbert (New Zealand)

Gold medal match

November 23
18:18

Japan	28 – 21	Hong Kong
Try: Tsuiki 4' c Wada (2) 5' c, 10' c Nagatomo 18' c Con: Shomen (4/4)		Try: Varty 9' c Robertson 12' c Yiu K.S. 15' c Con: Robertson (3/3)

University City Stadium, Guangzhou
Referee: Alan Whitcombe (Great Britain)

=== Women's tournament ===
Team

Akari Fujisaki
Chikami Inoue
Keiko Kato
Anri Kawano
Kana Mitsugi
Mami Okada
Ayaka Susuki
Misaki Susuki
Ayako Tanaka
Makiko Tomita
Marie Yamaguchi
Rinako Yokoyama

Preliminary round

Pool B

Team	Pld	W	D	L	PF	PA	PD	Pts
Kazakhstan	3	3	0	0	100	7	+93	9
Japan	3	2	0	1	62	33	+29	7
Singapore	3	1	0	2	34	53	−19	5
India	3	0	0	3	5	108	−103	3

November 21
16:35

Japan	19 – 12	Singapore
Try: Mitsugi 7' c Yamaguchi 12' c Tomita 14' m Con: Mitsugi (1/1); A. Suzuki (1/2)		Try: Chua J.L. 5' c Wang S.I. 14' m Con: Tay (1/1)

University City Stadium, Guangzhou
Referee: Anastassiya Khamova (Kazakhstan)

November 22
10:09

Japan	36 – 0	India
Try: Yamaguchi 1' m Yokoyama 7' c Fujisaki (2) 8' m, 11' c Kato 14' m Kawano 14' c Con: Yokoyama (3/6)

University City Stadium, Guangzhou
Referee: Azhar Yusof (Singapore)

November 22
13:46

Kazakhstan	21 – 7	Japan
Try: Sherer (2) 7' c, 11' c Teryayeva 10' c Con: Yakovleva (3/3)		Try: A. Suzuki 3' c Con: A. Suzuki (1/1)

University City Stadium, Guangzhou
Referee: Anthony Lothian (Hong Kong)

Quarterfinals

November 23
9:23

Japan	14 – 19	Hong Kong
Try: Tomita 2' c Kato 10' c Con: A. Suzuki (2/2)		Try: Poon P.Y. (2) 4' c, 12'm Scott 7' c Con: Lai P.F. (1/1); Poon P.Y. (1/2)

University City Stadium, Guangzhou
Referee: Azhar Yusof (Singapore)

5–8 placing

November 23
12:09

India	0 – 46	Japan
		Try: Mitsugi (3) 2' m, 6' c, 14' c Okada 4' m Yamaguchi (2) 7' m, 9' m Tanaka (2) 12' m, 14' c< Con: A. Suzuki (1/3); Yokoyama (2/5)

University City Stadium, Guangzhou
Referee: Anastassiya Khamova (Kazakhstan)

5th/6th placing

November 23
15:41

Japan	31 – 0	Singapore
Try: Yamaguchi (3) 5' m, 6' c, 7' m Inoue 10' c Tanaka 14' c Con: A. Suzuki (3/5)

University City Stadium, Guangzhou
Referee: Alan Whitcombe (Great Britain)
