= Rugby sevens at the 2014 Asian Games – Women's tournament =

Women at the 2014 Asian Games
- Venue: Namdong Asiad Rugby Field
- Date: 30 September – 2 October 2014
- Competitors: 120 from 10 nations

Medalists
gold medal	China
silver medal	Japan
bronze medal	Kazakhstan

The 2014 Women's Asian Games Rugby sevens Tournament was held in Incheon, South Korea from September 30 to October 2, 2014.

== Squads ==
China	Hong Kong	Japan	Kazakhstan
Guan Qishi; Yang Hong; Liu Yang; Yang Min; Yu Xiaoming; Sun Tingting; Lu Yuanyuan; Chen Keyi; Jiang Qianqian; Sun Shichao; Zhou Lilian; Yu Liping	Melody Li; Royce Chan; Christy Cheng; Kwong Sau Yan; Nam Ka Man; Sham Wai Sum; Lai Pou Fan; Rose Fong; Cheng Tsz Ting; Lindsay Varty; Yuen Lok Yee; Aggie Poon	Chiharu Nakamura; Aya Takeuchi; Noriko Taniguchi; Makiko Tomita; Mifuyu Koide; Chisato Yokoo; Keiko Kato; Yuka Kanematsu; Rei Yamada; Marie Yamaguchi; Ano Kuwai; Yoko Suzuki	Veronika Stepanyuga; Yelena Yevdokimova; Oxana Shadrina; Lyudmila Sapronova; Amina Baratova; Marianna Balashova; Kundyzay Baktybayeva; Anna Yakovleva; Symbat Zhamankulova; Svetlana Klyuchnikova; Liliya Bazyaruk; Nigora Nurmatova
Laos	Malaysia	Singapore	South Korea
Sisomphu Inthavong; Thipphachanh Keomanisay; Toukta Khambounheuang; Lao Khang; Somchith Phanthachak; Thiphaphone Phoutthavong; Soutsada Siliphongphanh; Viengphanh Thongmala; Dalavanh Vinayya; Boudsadee Vongdala; Suvanhny Bounyavouth; Viengsamai Souksavanh	Jasmine Kaur Bhatt; Nor Halina Zaini; Rozzaiti Che Roslee; Chut Iffa Izza; Liyana Kamarul Bahrin; Nurfarah Hanim Rahim; Haslinda Salleh; Mas Mulsah Ismail; Aki Loh Nong Sim; Normasyirah Zahari; Mona Tiara Izaniah; Fidelia Telajan	Annabel Woo; Wong Yilin; Lee Yi Tian; Wang Shao Ing; Samantha Teo; Chan Jia Yu; Alvinia Ow Yong; Low Yu Hui; Goh Xin Yi; Elly Sudira; Christabelle Lim; Eunice Chu	Lim Jae-won; Choi Min-jeong; Jung Si-yoon; Choi Ye-seul; Seo Bo-hee; Kim Dong-lee; Seo Mi-ji; Lee Ji-su; Yu Jin-ju; Jeong Hye-soo; Lee Ju-yeon; Hwang Soo-jin
Thailand	Uzbekistan		
Naritsara Worakitsirikun; Jutamas Butket; Simaporn Noopaen; Jeeraporn Peerabunanon; Rattanaporn Wittayaronnayut; Piyamat Chomphumee; Chitchanok Yusri; Rasamee Sisongkham; Uthumporn Liamrat; Butsaya Bunrak; Phanthippha Wongwangchan; Nuengruethai Jaemit	Mariya Dudenko; Olga Glukhovkina; Azizakhon Burkhanova; Dinara Kadirova; Sevara Kuchmuradova; Lyudmila Molodtsova; Umida Saribaeva; Anna Pavlova; Yuliya Ignatenko; Anna Asfandiyarova; Gulasalkhon Juraeva; Arina Klimashina		

== Results ==
All times are Korea Standard Time (UTC+09:00)

=== Preliminary round ===
==== Pool A ====
Pos	Team	Pld	W	D	L	PF	PA	PD	Pts	Qualification
1	China	4	4	0	0	164	7	+157	12	Semifinals
2	Japan	4	3	0	1	163	28	+135	10	Semifinals
3	Singapore	4	2	0	2	41	103	−62	8	Classification 5th–8th
4	Uzbekistan	4	1	0	3	10	104	−94	6	Classification 5th–8th
5	South Korea	4	0	0	4	7	143	−136	4	Classification 9th–10th

Source: Results

30 September
11:00

Japan	46–0	Uzbekistan
Try: Takeuchi 1' c Koide 3' m Yamaguchi 5' c Nakamura (2) 6' m, 12' m Yamada 9' m Kuwai 11' m Kato 14' m Con: Nakamura (2/6); Taniguchi (1/1)

Namdong Asiad Rugby Field, Incheon
Referee: Wu Zhihong (China)

30 September
11:22

Singapore	19–0	South Korea
Try: Teo (2) 3' c, 7+' c Chan 6' m Con: Lim (2/3)

Namdong Asiad Rugby Field, Incheon
Referee: Chris Linwood (United Arab Emirates)

30 September
14:40

China	29–0	Uzbekistan
Try: Guan 1' m Zhou 4' c Sun S. 7' m Liu (2) 8' m, 14' c Con: Yu X. (2/5)

Namdong Asiad Rugby Field, Incheon
Referee: Lee Wing Yi (Hong Kong)

30 September
15:02

Japan	50–0	South Korea
Try: Kuwai (2) 1' m, 14' m Suzuki 4' m Yamada (3) 7' c, 9' c, 13' c Kato 10' c Yamaguchi 11' c Con: Nakamura (1/3); Kanematsu (4/5)

Namdong Asiad Rugby Field, Incheon
Referee: Wu Zhihong (China)

30 September
18:20

China	64–0	South Korea
Try: Sun S. 7' m Guan 3' m Zhou (2) 4' c, 10' m Jiang (2) 6' c, 12' c Yu X. (3) 7+' c, 8' c, 11' c Yu L. 14' c Con: Yu X. (7/10)

Namdong Asiad Rugby Field, Incheon
Referee: Dewi Rowlands (Hong Kong)

30 September
18:42

Japan	60–0	Singapore
Try: Kuwai (3) 1' m, 5' m, 8' m Taniguchi 2' c Yamaguchi 4' c Yamada (2) 7' c, 10' c Koide 11' m Kato (2) 13' c, 14+' m Con: Nakamura (5/10)

Namdong Asiad Rugby Field, Incheon
Referee: Lee Wing Yi (Hong Kong)

1 October
11:00

China	43–0	Singapore
Try: Zhou 2' c Sun S. 4' c Lu 7' m Guan 8' c Liu (2) 10' c, 14' m Chen 12' m Con: Yu X. (4/7)

Namdong Asiad Rugby Field, Incheon
Referee: Norman Drake (United Arab Emirates)

1 October
11:22

South Korea	7–10	Uzbekistan
Try: Kim 6' c Con: Seo M. (1/1)		Try: Asfandiyarova 7+' m Saribaeva 8' m Con: Saribaeva (0/2)

Namdong Asiad Rugby Field, Incheon
Referee: Paul McKay (Singapore)

1 October
14:40

China	28–7	Japan
Try: Zhou 1' c Lu 3' c Yu X. (2) 4' c, 12' c Con: Yu X. (4/4)		Try: Nakamura 9' c Con: Nakamura (1/1)

Namdong Asiad Rugby Field, Incheon
Referee: Dewi Rowlands (Hong Kong)

1 October
15:02

Singapore	22–0	Uzbekistan
Try: Chan (2) 6' m, 9' c Low 12' m Teo 14' m Con: Lim (1/3); Wong (0/1)

Namdong Asiad Rugby Field, Incheon
Referee: Kim Yong-hoe (South Korea)

==== Pool B ====
Pos	Team	Pld	W	D	L	PF	PA	PD	Pts	Qualification
1	Hong Kong	4	4	0	0	162	21	+141	12	Semifinals
2	Kazakhstan	4	3	0	1	159	17	+142	10	Semifinals
3	Thailand	4	2	0	2	108	55	+53	8	Classification 5th–8th
4	Malaysia	4	1	0	3	12	178	−166	6	Classification 5th–8th
5	Laos	4	0	0	4	5	175	−170	4	Classification 9th–10th

Source: Results

30 September
11:44

Hong Kong	52–0	Laos
Try: Kwong (2) 2' c, 8' c Poon (2) 3' m, 7' c Chan 6' c C. Cheng 9' m Sham 13' c Lai 14' c Con: Poon (3/5); Lai (2/2); Fong (1/1)

Namdong Asiad Rugby Field, Incheon
Referee: Norman Drake (United Arab Emirates)

30 September
12:06

Thailand	52–0	Malaysia
Try: Worakitsirikun (2) 1' c, 4' c Liamrat (3) 5' c, 12' c, 14+' c Butket 7' m Yusri 9' c Jaemit 11' m Con: Bunrak (5/7); Noopaen (1/1)

Namdong Asiad Rugby Field, Incheon
Referee: Paul McKay (Singapore)

30 September
15:24

Kazakhstan	74–0	Laos
Try: Zhamankulova (2) 1' m, 6' c Bazyaruk (3) 2' m, 7' c, 9' m Baktybayeva (2) 4' c, 13' c Yevdokimova 6' m Nurmatova 8' c Sapronova (2) 11' c, 14' m Baratova 14+' c Con: Baktybayeva (5/9); Shadrina (2/3)

Namdong Asiad Rugby Field, Incheon
Referee: Kim Yong-hoe (South Korea)

30 September
15:46

Hong Kong	65–0	Malaysia
Try: Li 1' c Poon 3' m Lai 4' c Fong (3) 6' m, 8' c, 10' m C. Cheng 9' m Yuen 12' m Cheng T. 13' c Nam 14' m Kwong 14+' c Con: Lai (3/6); Poon (1/3); Fong (1/2)

Namdong Asiad Rugby Field, Incheon
Referee: Shuhei Kubo (Japan)

30 September
19:04

Kazakhstan	56–0	Malaysia
Try: Baktybayeva 1' c Zhamankulova 2' c Bazyaruk (2) 4' m, 6' m Nurmatova (2) 7' c, 12' m Baratova 8' m Yevdokimova 10' m Shadrina 11' m Balashova 14+' m Con: Baktybayeva (3/6); Shadrina (0/4)

Namdong Asiad Rugby Field, Incheon
Referee: Wu Zhihong (China)

30 September
19:26

Hong Kong	33–14	Thailand
Try: Poon (2) 2' c, 13' m Fong (2) 4' c, 14' c Chan 11' c Con: Poon (1/1); Fong (1/1); Lai (2/3)		Try: Chomphumee 5' c Liamrat 7' c Con: Bunrak (1/1); Butket (1/1)

Namdong Asiad Rugby Field, Incheon
Referee: Paul McKay (Singapore)

1 October
11:44

Kazakhstan	22–5	Thailand
Try: Balashova 3' m Bazyaruk (2) 9' c, 14' m Baratova 10' m Con: Baktybayeva (1/3); Shadrina (0/1)		Try: Butket 14+' m Con: Bunrak (0/1)

Namdong Asiad Rugby Field, Incheon
Referee: Wu Zhihong (China)

1 October
12:06

Malaysia	12–5	Laos
Try: Roslee 4' c Zahari 6' m Con: Zahari (1/2)		Try: Vongdala 11' m Con: Inthavong (0/1)

Namdong Asiad Rugby Field, Incheon
Referee: Chris Linwood (United Arab Emirates)

1 October
15:24

Kazakhstan	7–12	Hong Kong
Try: Sapronova 5' c Con: Baktybayeva (1/1)		Try: Poon (2) 1' m, 13' c Con: Poon (1/2)

Namdong Asiad Rugby Field, Incheon
Referee: Azhar Yusof (Singapore)

1 October
15:46

Thailand	37–0	Laos
Try: Peerabunanon 1' m Sisongkham 3' c Jaemit (3) 3' m, 6' m, 7' m Worakitsirikun (2) 10' m, 10' m Con: Noopaen (0/3); Bunrak (1/4)

Namdong Asiad Rugby Field, Incheon
Referee: Wu Zhihong (China)

=== Classification 9th–10th ===
2 October
13:44

South Korea	34–0	Laos
Try: Choi Y. 2' m Choi M. (4) 3' c, 6' c, 9' m, 14' m Kim 12' m Con: Seo M. (2/5); Seo B. (0/1)

Namdong Asiad Rugby Field, Incheon
Referee: Azhar Yusof (Singapore)

=== Classification 5th–8th ===
Classification 5th–8th
2 October
Singapore	27
Malaysia	0
2 October
Uzbekistan	0
Thailand	33

Classification 5th–6th
2 October
Singapore	7
Thailand	38
Classification 7th–8th
2 October
Malaysia	5
Uzbekistan	12

==== Semifinals ====
2 October
13:00

Singapore	27–0	Malaysia
Try: Teo (2) 4' m, 14' m Chan (2) 7' m, 13' m Lee 9' c Con: Lim (1/4); Wong (0/1)

Namdong Asiad Rugby Field, Incheon
Referee: Kim Yong-hoe (South Korea)

2 October
13:22

Uzbekistan	0–33	Thailand
		Try: Yusri (2) 3' m, 5' c Liamrat (2) 7' c, 14' c Wongwangchan 11' c Con: Bunrak (3/4); Noopaen (1/1)

Namdong Asiad Rugby Field, Incheon
Referee: Chris Linwood (United Arab Emirates)

==== Classification 7th–8th ====
2 October
17:02

Malaysia	5–12	Uzbekistan
Try: Salleh 10' m Con: Zahari (0/1)		Try: Klimashina 3' m Asfandiyarova 13' c Con: Saribaeva (1/2)

Namdong Asiad Rugby Field, Incheon
Referee: Azhar Yusof (Singapore)

==== Classification 5th–6th ====
2 October
17:24

Singapore	7–38	Thailand
Try: Sudira 14+' c Con: Wong (1/1)		Try: Wongwangchan (2) 1' c, 5' c Yusri 2' c Liamrat (2) 7' m, 10' c Wittayaronnayut 11' m Con: Bunrak (2/3); Butket (2/3)

Namdong Asiad Rugby Field, Incheon
Referee: Chris Linwood (United Arab Emirates)

=== Final round ===
Semifinals
2 October
China	24
Kazakhstan	12
2 October
Japan	17
Hong Kong	10

Gold medal match
2 October
China	14
Japan	12
Bronze medal match
2 October
Kazakhstan	12
Hong Kong	0

==== Semifinals ====
2 October
15:34

China	24–12	Kazakhstan
Try: Jiang (2) 1' c, 7+' m Yu X. 9' c Sun T. 14+' m Con: Yu X. (2/4)		Try: Bazyaruk 4' c Zhamankulova 12' m Con: Baktybayeva (1/2)

Namdong Asiad Rugby Field, Incheon
Referee: Lee Wing Yi (Hong Kong)

2 October
15:56

Japan	17–10	Hong Kong
Try: Koide 5' c Kuwai 9' m Takeuchi 13' m Con: Nakamura (1/3)		Try: Poon 11' m Cheng T. 14+' m Con: Lai (0/1)

Namdong Asiad Rugby Field, Incheon
Referee: Paul McKay (Singapore)

==== Bronze medal match ====
2 October
18:30

Kazakhstan	12–0	Hong Kong
Try: Bazyaruk 5' m Baratova 12' c Con: Baktybayeva (1/2)

Namdong Asiad Rugby Field, Incheon
Referee: Taku Otsuki (Japan)

==== Gold medal match ====
2 October
19:14

China	14–12	Japan
Try: Zhou 2' c Sun S. 10' c Con: Yu X. (2/2)		Try: Yamaguchi 7' c Nakamura 18' m Con: Nakamura (1/2)

Namdong Asiad Rugby Field, Incheon
Referee: Lee Wing Yi (Hong Kong)

== Final standing ==
Rank	Team	Pld	W	D	L
1st place, gold medalist(s)	China	6	6	0	0
2nd place, silver medalist(s)	Japan	6	4	0	2
3rd place, bronze medalist(s)	Kazakhstan	6	4	0	2
4	Hong Kong	6	4	0	2
5	Thailand	6	4	0	2
6	Singapore	6	3	0	3
7	Uzbekistan	6	2	0	4
8	Malaysia	6	1	0	5
9	South Korea	5	1	0	4
10	Laos	5	0	0	5
