= Rugby sevens at the 2014 Asian Games =

Asian Games rugby competition

- Venue: Namdong Asiad Rugby Field
- Dates: 30 September – 2 October 2014
- Competitors: 263 from 16 nations

Rugby sevens at the 2014 Asian Games was held in Namdong Asiad Rugby Field, Incheon from 30 September to 2 October 2014.

== Schedule ==
P	Preliminary round	¼	Quarterfinals	½	Semifinals	F	Finals

Event↓/Date →	30th Tue	1st Wed		2nd Thu	
Men	P	P	¼	½	F
Women	P	P		½	F

== Medalists ==
Event	Gold	Silver	Bronze
Men	Japan; Yusaku Kuwazuru; Shota Hagisawa; Michael Leitch; Lepuha Latuila; Makoto Kato; Masakatsu Hikosaka; Katsuyuki Sakai; Takashi Suzuki; Rakuhei Yamashita; Kazushi Hano; Lomano Lemeki; Masaki Watanabe	Hong Kong; Kwok Ka Chun; Jack Capon; Max Woodward; Michael Coverdale; Cado Lee; Keith Robertson; Alex McQueen; Mark Wright; Rowan Varty; Jamie Hood; Tom McQueen; Salom Yiu	South Korea; Han Kun-kyu; Yoon Tae-il; Kim Jeong-min; Yang Young-hun; Oh Youn-hyung; Kim Sung-soo; Kim Gwong-min; Kim Hyun-soo; Park Wan-yong; Kim Nam-uk; Jeong Yeon-sik; Lee Yong-seung
Women	China; Guan Qishi; Yang Hong; Liu Yang; Yang Min; Yu Xiaoming; Sun Tingting; Lu Yuanyuan; Chen Keyi; Jiang Qianqian; Sun Shichao; Zhou Lilian; Yu Liping	Japan; Chiharu Nakamura; Aya Takeuchi; Noriko Taniguchi; Makiko Tomita; Mifuyu Koide; Chisato Yokoo; Keiko Kato; Yuka Kanematsu; Rei Yamada; Marie Yamaguchi; Ano Kuwai; Yoko Suzuki	Kazakhstan; Veronika Stepanyuga; Yelena Yevdokimova; Oxana Shadrina; Lyudmila Sapronova; Amina Baratova; Marianna Balashova; Kundyzay Baktybayeva; Anna Yakovleva; Symbat Zhamankulova; Svetlana Klyuchnikova; Liliya Bazyaruk; Nigora Nurmatova

== Medal table ==
Rank	Nation	Gold	Silver	Bronze	Total
1	Japan (JPN)	1	1	0	2
2	China (CHN)	1	0	0	1
3	Hong Kong (HKG)	0	1	0	1
4	Kazakhstan (KAZ)	0	0	1	1
4	South Korea (KOR)	0	0	1	1
Totals (5 entries)		2	2	2	6

== Draw ==
A draw ceremony was held on 21 August 2014 to determine the groups for the men's and women's competitions. The teams were seeded based on their results in past four years starting from the 2010 Asian Games.

=== Men ===
Pool A

- Japan
- Malaysia
- Thailand
- Repechage 2

Pool B

- Hong Kong
- China
- Philippines
- Repechage 1

Pool C

- South Korea
- Sri Lanka
- Chinese Taipei
- ~~India~~*

Repechage

- Pakistan
- Lebanon
- Saudi Arabia

* India withdrew, therefore Pakistan, Lebanon and Saudi Arabia advanced to the main round without playing the repechage round.

=== Women ===
Pool A

- China
- Hong Kong
- Malaysia
- Laos

Pool B

- Kazakhstan
- Thailand
- South Korea

Pool C

- Japan
- Singapore
- ~~India~~*
- Uzbekistan

* India withdrew, The revised draw took place few days before the competition.

Pool A

- China
- Japan
- Singapore
- South Korea
- Uzbekistan

Pool B

- Kazakhstan
- Hong Kong
- Thailand
- Malaysia
- Laos

== Final standing ==
=== Men ===
Rank	Team	Pld	W	D	L
1st place, gold medalist(s)	Japan	6	6	0	0
2nd place, silver medalist(s)	Hong Kong	6	5	0	1
3rd place, bronze medalist(s)	South Korea	6	5	0	1
4	Sri Lanka	6	3	0	3
5	Philippines	6	3	0	3
6	China	6	3	0	3
7	Thailand	6	3	0	3
8	Chinese Taipei	6	1	0	5
9	Malaysia	5	3	0	2
10	Lebanon	5	1	0	4
11	Pakistan	5	1	0	4
12	Saudi Arabia	5	0	0	5

=== Women ===
Rank	Team	Pld	W	D	L
1st place, gold medalist(s)	China	6	6	0	0
2nd place, silver medalist(s)	Japan	6	4	0	2
3rd place, bronze medalist(s)	Kazakhstan	6	4	0	2
4	Hong Kong	6	4	0	2
5	Thailand	6	4	0	2
6	Singapore	6	3	0	3
7	Uzbekistan	6	2	0	4
8	Malaysia	6	1	0	5
9	South Korea	5	1	0	4
10	Laos	5	0	0	5
