= Bi Yirong =

Chinese swimmer (born 1996)

Personal information
- Full name: Bi Yirong
- Nickname: Rose
- National team: China
- Born: Hangzhou, China

Chinese name
- Traditional Chinese: 畢易榕
- Simplified Chinese: 毕易榕
- Hanyu Pinyin: Bì Yìróng

Sport
- Sport: Swimming
- Strokes: Freestyle
- College team: University of Michigan
Medal record
Women's swimming
Representing China
Asian Games
Gold medal – first place	2014 Incheon	800m freestyle
Silver medal – second place	2014 Incheon	400m freestyle

Bi Yirong (born 1996) is a Chinese competitive swimmer who won the gold medal in the 800 meter freestyle at the 2014 Asian Games. She also won a silver medal in 400 meter freestyle there. She specializes in freestyle. In 2016, she joined the University of Michigan swim team. She has produced a total of two international medals, one gold and one silver, both in the 2014 Asian Games.

== Personal life ==
Bi was born in Hangzhou in 1996. Her given name Yirong expresses her father's wish that she would have an easy life; it is literally the Chinese word for "easy" (Chinese: 容易; pinyin: Róngyì) with the syllables reversed and a "tree" radical added to the character for "róng", making it into a homophonous morpheme meaning "banyan".

== Swimming career ==
=== 2013 Chinese National Championships ===
At the 2013 Chinese National Championships, Bi won a gold medal in the 800 meter freestyle. With a time of 8:36.01, she finished almost three seconds ahead of 2nd-place finisher Liu Yiru and five seconds ahead of 3rd-place finisher Yan Siyu. She also won a gold medal in the 400 meter freestyle, a day before she won the 800 meter. She finished with a time of 4:09.41, finishing four seconds ahead of 2nd and 3rd-place finisher Zhang Yufei and Yan Siyu.

=== 2014 Asian Games ===
At the 2014 Asian Games, Bi won a gold medal in the 800 meter freestyle. She finished with a time of 8:27.54, finishing ahead of Chinese teammate Xu Danlu and Japanese swimmer Asami Chida. She also won a silver medal in the 400 meter freestyle with a time of 4:08.23, one second behind 1st-place finisher Zhang Yuhan.

=== University of Michigan ===
In January 2016, Bi joined the University of Michigan swim team.

==== College honors ====
Two-time NCAA All-American (2016: 500-yard Freestyle, 1,650-yard Freestyle)
• Big Ten champion (2016: 800-yard Freestyle Relay)
• All-Big Ten (2016: First Team)
• CSCAA Scholar All-American (2016)

Sophomore (2016–17)
• Big Ten Swimmer of the Week (Oct. 12)
• USA College Challenge (Nov. 12-13): Finished 3rd in the 500-yard Freestyle (4:39.16) and the 1000-yard Freestyle (9:28.38), and 5th in the 400-yard IM (4:10.43).

Freshman (2015–16)
• Two-time NCAA All-American (2016: 500-yard Freestyle, 1,650-yard Freestyle)
• Big Ten champion (800-yard Freestyle Relay)
• All-Big Ten (First Team)
• CSCAA Scholar All-American
• NCAA Championships (March 16–19): Finished 3rd in 1,650-yard Freestyle (15:45.26), 5th in 500-yard Freestyle (4:35.76) and 23rd in 400-yard IM (4:10.34).
• Big Ten Championships (Feb. 17-20): Finished 2nd in both the 500-yard Freestyle (4:35.69) and 1,650-yard Freestyle (15:50.56), and 3rd in the 400-yard IM (4:08.56).
