= Rugby sevens at the 2018 Asian Games =

Asian Games rugby

- Venue: Gelora Bung Karno Rugby Field
- Dates: 30 August – 1 September 2018
- Competitors: 239 from 13 nations

Rugby sevens at the 2018 Asian Games was held over three days from 30 August to 1 September 2018. This was the sixth appearance of rugby sevens at the Asian Games. The Games was planned to be held at the Wibawa Mukti Stadium in Bekasi but then moved to Rugby Field inside the Gelora Bung Karno Sports Complex.

== Schedule ==
| P | Preliminary round | ¼ | Quarterfinals | ½ | Semifinals | F | Finals |

| Event↓/Date → | 30th Thu | 31st Fri | | 1st Sat | |
|---|---|---|---|---|---|
| Men | P | P | ¼ | ½ | F |
| Women | P | P | ¼ | ½ | F |

== Medalists ==
| Event | Gold | Silver | Bronze |
|---|---|---|---|
| Men | Hong Kong; Lee Jones; Michael Coverdale; Max Woodward; Liam Herbert; Jamie Hood; Hugo Stiles; Alessandro Nardoni; Max Denmark; Ben Rimene; Eric Kwok; Cado Lee; Salom Yiu | Japan; Lote Tuqiri; Tevita Tupou; Taisei Hayashi; Rikiya Oishi; Kameli Soejima; Dai Ozawa; Katsuyuki Sakai; Keisuke Shin; Ryota Kano; Kosuke Hashino; Chihito Matsui; Naoki Motomura | South Korea; Han Kun-kyu; Kim Jeong-min; Kim Hyun-soo; Chang Yong-heung; Lee Jae-bok; Kim Nam-uk; Jang Jeong-min; Hwang In-jo; Jang Seong-min; Kim Jin-hyeok; Kim Gwong-min; Kim Sung-soo |
| Women | Japan; Chiharu Nakamura; Noriko Taniguchi; Raichel Bativakalolo; Yume Okuroda; Fumiko Otake; Riho Kurogi; Tomomi Kozasa; Iroha Nagata; Yukari Tateyama; Yume Hirano; Ano Kuwai; Emii Tanaka | China; Lu Yuanyuan; Yang Min; Chen Ming; Hu Yu; Yan Meiling; Wang Wanyu; Chen Keyi; Liu Xiaoqian; Yu Xiaoming; Yu Liping; Gao Yueying; Sun Caihong | Kazakhstan; Veronika Stepanyuga; Nigora Nurmatova; Karina Proskurina; Yeva Bekker; Vlada Odnoletok; Olessya Teryayeva; Kundyzay Baktybayeva; Anna Yakovleva; Svetlana Klyuchnikova; Balzhan Koishybayeva; Darya Tkachyova; Lyudmila Korotkikh |

== Medal table ==
| Rank | Nation | Gold | Silver | Bronze | Total |
|---|---|---|---|---|---|
| 1 | Japan (JPN) | 1 | 1 | 0 | 2 |
| 2 | Hong Kong (HKG) | 1 | 0 | 0 | 1 |
| 3 | China (CHN) | 0 | 1 | 0 | 1 |
| 4 | Kazakhstan (KAZ) | 0 | 0 | 1 | 1 |
| 4 | South Korea (KOR) | 0 | 0 | 1 | 1 |
| Totals (5 entries) | | 2 | 2 | 2 | 6 |

== Draw ==
The draw for the competition was done at the JS Luwansa Hotel, Jakarta on 5 July 2018. The draw was conducted by Indonesian Asian Games Organizing Committee (INASGOC) in the presence of general manager Asia Rugby.

=== Men ===
Group A

- Hong Kong
- China
- Thailand
- Pakistan

Group B

- Japan
- Malaysia
- Chinese Taipei
- Indonesia

Group C

- South Korea
- Sri Lanka
- United Arab Emirates
- Afghanistan

=== Women ===
Group A

- China
- Hong Kong
- Singapore
- South Korea

Group B

- Japan
- Kazakhstan
- Thailand
- Indonesia

== Final standing ==
=== Men ===
| Rank | Team | Pld | W | D | L |
|---|---|---|---|---|---|
| 1st place, gold medalist(s) | Hong Kong | 6 | 6 | 0 | 0 |
| 2nd place, silver medalist(s) | Japan | 6 | 5 | 0 | 1 |
| 3rd place, bronze medalist(s) | South Korea | 6 | 5 | 0 | 1 |
| 4 | Sri Lanka | 6 | 3 | 0 | 3 |
| 5 | Malaysia | 6 | 4 | 0 | 2 |
| 6 | China | 6 | 3 | 0 | 3 |
| 7 | Chinese Taipei | 6 | 2 | 0 | 4 |
| 8 | Thailand | 6 | 1 | 0 | 5 |
| 9 | Afghanistan | 6 | 4 | 0 | 2 |
| 10 | Pakistan | 6 | 2 | 0 | 4 |
| 11 | Indonesia | 6 | 1 | 0 | 5 |
| 12 | United Arab Emirates | 6 | 0 | 0 | 6 |

=== Women ===
| Rank | Team | Pld | W | D | L |
|---|---|---|---|---|---|
| 1st place, gold medalist(s) | Japan | 6 | 6 | 0 | 0 |
| 2nd place, silver medalist(s) | China | 6 | 5 | 0 | 1 |
| 3rd place, bronze medalist(s) | Kazakhstan | 6 | 4 | 0 | 2 |
| 4 | Thailand | 6 | 2 | 0 | 4 |
| 5 | Hong Kong | 6 | 4 | 0 | 2 |
| 6 | Singapore | 6 | 2 | 0 | 4 |
| 7 | South Korea | 6 | 1 | 0 | 5 |
| 8 | Indonesia | 6 | 0 | 0 | 6 |
