= Rugby union in Kazakhstan =

- Country: Kazakhstan
- Governing body: Kazakhstan Rugby Union
- National team: Kazakhstan
- Registered players: 2,465
- Clubs: 21

National competitions
- Rugby World Cup; Rugby World Cup Sevens; IRB Sevens World Series

Rugby union in Kazakhstan is a fairly popular sport. As of May 2018, they are ranked 61st by World Rugby, and as of June 2009, they had 2335 registered players and twenty clubs.

== Governing body ==
The national body is the Kazakhstan Rugby Union.

== History ==
=== Soviet Period ===
Rugby union was played in the Russian Empire as early as in 1908. In 1934 the Moscow Championship was started, and in 1936 the first Soviet Championship took place.

In 1949, rugby union was forbidden in the USSR during the "fight against the cosmopolitanism". The competitions were resumed in 1957, and the Soviet Championship in 1966. In 1975 the Soviet national team played their first match.

Kazakhstan had its own rugby team in the USSR, but it was not treated as a proper national side.

The SKA from Alma-Ata was a quite successful club in the Soviet era, finishing 3rd and 2nd respectively of the 1988 and 1991 championships, and also winning the Soviet Cup in 1988.

=== Post-independence ===
Kazakhstan is an ex-Soviet rugby nation besides from Georgia and Russia, which have both qualified for the Rugby World Cup.

The Kazakhstan women's national rugby union team played their first international against Germany in 1993, which they lost by one point, 11-10. The female team also takes part in the ARFU Women's Rugby Championship.

Rugby continues to be moderately popular. The Japan-Kazakhstan Asian Five Nations game in Almaty Central Stadium, Almaty was attended by 6,000 people. This was unfortunately also their worst loss, 82-6.

== See also ==
- Kazakhstan national rugby union team
- Kazakhstan women's national rugby union team
- Kazakhstan national rugby union team (sevens)
