= Swimming at the 2014 Asian Games – Women's 400 metre freestyle =

Women's 400 metre freestyle at the 2014 Asian Games
- Venue: Munhak Park Tae-hwan Aquatics Center
- Date: 21 September 2014
- Competitors: 19 from 12 nations

Medalists
gold medal	Zhang Yuhan	China
silver medal	Bi Yirong	China
bronze medal	Chihiro Igarashi	Japan

The women's 400 metre freestyle event at the 2014 Asian Games took place on 21 September 2014 at Munhak Park Tae-hwan Aquatics Center.

== Schedule ==
All times are Korea Standard Time (UTC+09:00)

Date	Time	Event
Sunday, 21 September 2014	09:00	Heats
Sunday, 21 September 2014	19:07	Final

== Records ==
Prior to this competition, the existing world, Asian and Games records were as follows.

World Record	Katie Ledecky (USA)	3:58.37	Gold Coast, Australia	23 August 2014
Asian Record	Chen Qian (CHN)	4:02.35	Jinan, China	18 October 2009
Games Record	Shao Yiwen (CHN)	4:05.58	Guangzhou, China	15 November 2010

== Results ==
=== Heats ===
Rank	Heat	Athlete	Time	Notes
1	3	Bi Yirong (CHN)	4:12.27	
2	2	Zhang Yuhan (CHN)	4:12.82	
3	3	Chihiro Igarashi (JPN)	4:14.29	
4	2	Asami Chida (JPN)	4:14.80	
5	2	Sarisa Suwannachet (THA)	4:16.82	
6	3	Benjaporn Sriphanomthorn (THA)	4:17.05	
7	3	Kim Su-yeon (KOR)	4:17.18	
8	2	Khoo Cai Lin (MAS)	4:18.07	
9	3	Lynette Lim (SIN)	4:19.68	
10	3	Ranohon Amanova (UZB)	4:21.08	
11	2	Rachel Tseng (SIN)	4:21.39	
12	2	Yang Chin-kuei (TPE)	4:21.58	
13	2	Kim Jung-hye (KOR)	4:22.07	
14	3	Teng Yu-wen (TPE)	4:30.20	
15	2	Heather Cheng (HKG)	4:33.42	
16	1	Tam Hoi Lam (HKG)	4:33.89	
17	3	Bayan Jumah (SYR)	4:33.91	
18	1	Gabriella Doueihy (LIB)	4:41.84	
19	1	Aminath Shajan (MDV)	5:22.30	

=== Final ===
Rank	Athlete	Time	Notes
1st place, gold medalist(s)	Zhang Yuhan (CHN)	4:07.67	
2nd place, silver medalist(s)	Bi Yirong (CHN)	4:08.23	
3rd place, bronze medalist(s)	Chihiro Igarashi (JPN)	4:09.35	
4	Asami Chida (JPN)	4:09.64	
5	Sarisa Suwannachet (THA)	4:14.61	
6	Khoo Cai Lin (MAS)	4:18.13	
7	Kim Su-yeon (KOR)	4:19.82	
8	Benjaporn Sriphanomthorn (THA)	4:22.74	
