= Swimming at the 2014 Asian Games – Women's 800 metre freestyle =

Women's 800 metre freestyle at the 2014 Asian Games
- Venue: Munhak Park Tae-hwan Aquatics Center
- Date: 25 September 2014
- Competitors: 15 from 9 nations

Medalists
gold medal	Bi Yirong	China
silver medal	Xu Danlu	China
bronze medal	Asami Chida	Japan

The women's 800 metre freestyle event at the 2014 Asian Games took place on 25 September 2014 at Munhak Park Tae-hwan Aquatics Center.

== Schedule ==
All times are Korea Standard Time (UTC+09:00)

Date	Time	Event
Thursday, 25 September 2014	09:00	Slowest heat
Thursday, 25 September 2014	19:40	Fastest heat

== Records ==
Prior to this competition, the existing world, Asian and Games records were as follows.

World Record	Katie Ledecky (USA)	8:11.00	Gold Coast, Australia	21 August 2014
Asian Record	Xin Xin (CHN)	8:19.43	Shenyang, China	10 September 2013
Games Record	Li Xuanxu (CHN)	8:23.55	Guangzhou, China	17 November 2010

== Results ==
Rank	Heat	Athlete	Time	Notes
1st place, gold medalist(s)	2	Bi Yirong (CHN)	8:27.54	
2nd place, silver medalist(s)	2	Xu Danlu (CHN)	8:33.89	
3rd place, bronze medalist(s)	2	Asami Chida (JPN)	8:34.66	
4	2	Jo Hyeon-ju (KOR)	8:42.31	
5	2	Sarisa Suwannachet (THA)	8:43.00	
6	2	Chihiro Igarashi (JPN)	8:44.47	
7	1	Lynette Lim (SIN)	8:52.45	
8	2	Khoo Cai Lin (MAS)	8:53.51	
9	2	Benjaporn Sriphanomthorn (THA)	8:57.60	
10	1	Rachel Tseng (SIN)	8:58.59	
11	1	Teng Yu-wen (TPE)	9:06.43	
12	1	Yang Ming-hsuan (TPE)	9:06.51	
13	1	Heather Cheng (HKG)	9:23.40	
14	1	Gabriella Doueihy (LIB)	9:36.29	
15	1	Tam Hoi Lam (HKG)	9:36.75	
