= Aya Takeuchi =

Japan international rugby union player

Aya Nakajima
- Born: Takeuchi Aya (竹内 亜弥); 5 August 1986 (age 40) Gifu, Gifu, Japan
- Height: 167 cm (5 ft 6 in)
- Weight: 60 kg (132 lb; 9 st 6 lb)

Rugby union career
- Position(s): Lock (XVs), Prop (7s)
Senior career
Years	Team	Apps	(Points)
2014–	Arukas Queen Kumagaya		
International career
Years	Team	Apps	(Points)
2013–	Japan		
National sevens team
Years	Team		Comps
2013–	Japan 7s		
Medal record
Women's rugby sevens
Representing Japan
Asian Games
Silver medal – second place	2014 Incheon	Team

Aya Nakajima (née Takeuchi; born 5 August 1986) is a former Japanese rugby union and sevens player. She was a member of the Japanese sevens team that won a silver medal at the 2014 Asian Games. She also represented Japan at the 2016 Summer Olympics. She competed for Japan at the 2017 Women's Rugby World Cup.

== Early career ==
Nakajima attended Gifu City Iwanoda Kita Elementary School, and Taki Gakuen, junior and senior high schools. She played volleyball for ten years. Her mother was a member of the Kyoto University Volleyball Team, which inspired her to join Taki Gakuen Junior High School's volleyball team.

She devoted herself to volleyball at Taki Gakuen and Kyoto University, but they were not known for being strong schools, and the Kyoto University team was only playing in the fourth to sixth divisions of the Kansai League. At one point, the team's membership dwindled to just two, herself included.

During her fourth year at Kyoto University, she watched a game of the Kyoto University Gangsters, the university's American football team, the experience inspired her to want to play a contact sport.

She joined the major publishing company Shinchosha upon graduating from Kyoto University. She was assigned to their sales department, and was mainly responsible for visiting bookstores and sales promotion activities.

== Rugby career ==
When she started working, she considered playing American football, but there were no women's teams, so she decided to take up rugby instead. She joined the Waseda Club Ladies and later transferred to Setagaya Ladies.

In 2010, she tried out for the Japan women's national rugby union team tryouts held by the Japan Rugby Football Union, but was unsuccessful. She focused on improving her physique and began weight training with the aim of joining the national team.

She was eventually called up to the Japanese women's sevens team for the first time in 2013. She made her international sevens debut on 1 February, during the USA leg of the Women's Sevens Series in Houston. She came on as a substitute for Makiko Tomita in her sides pool game against Russia. She also made her Test debut for the Japan women's fifteens team in September that year, she played in the Asian qualifiers for the 2014 Women's Rugby World Cup.

In 2014, she joined Arukas Queen Kumagaya, which was established with the aim of promoting women's rugby, from Setagaya Ladies, and became its captain. With the number of trips and training camps increasing, she struggled to balance work with rugby, so she took a leave of absence from work in June 2014 to create an environment in which she could devote herself to her dream of competing in the Rio Olympics. She competed for the Japanese women's sevens team at the 2014 Asian Games in Incheon, South Korea, where she won a silver medal after her sides loss to China in the final.

In 2015, she captained the Arukas Queen Kumagaya to victory in the Taiyo Life Women's Sevens Series, a circuit tournament for women's sevens club teams. In November that year, she represented Japan in the Asian Qualifiers for the Rio Olympics. She played a key role in the two-round tournament, in Hong Kong and Tokyo, the Sakura sevens team won the overall championship and secured their place in the Rio Olympics.

In June 2016, she took a leave of absence from Shinchosha. On 7 August, due to an injury to Makiko Tomita, she was called-up to join the Japanese women's sevens team at the 2016 Summer Olympics. She had planned to return to work after the Olympics, but her passion for rugby grew stronger, so she decided to leave Shinchosha at the end of October 2016.

Nakajima competed for Japan at the 2017 Women's Rugby World Cup in Ireland. After the World Cup, she had stints in Australia and New Zealand.

== Coaching career ==
In June 2022, World Rugby announced that Nakajima would work alongside Sakura 15s Head coach, Lesley McKenzie, on the road to New Zealand as part of the 2021 Rugby World Cup coaching internship programme. She retired from international rugby, but continued playing at club level and worked as Japan’s team manager before being accepted onto the internship programme.

== Personal life ==
In March 2017, she married Arkas Academy head coach, Shinya Nakajima.
