= Swimming at the 2014 Asian Games – Men's 200 metre butterfly =

Men's 200 metre butterfly at the 2014 Asian Games
- Venue: Munhak Park Tae-hwan Aquatics Center
- Date: 21 September 2014
- Competitors: 11 from 8 nations

Medalists
gold medal	Daiya Seto	Japan
silver medal	Kenta Hirai	Japan
bronze medal	Joseph Schooling	Singapore

The men's 200 metre backstroke event at the 2014 Asian Games took place on 21 September 2014 at Munhak Park Tae-hwan Aquatics Center.

== Schedule ==
All times are Korea Standard Time (UTC+09:00)

Date	Time	Event
Sunday, 21 September 2014	09:00	Heats
Sunday, 21 September 2014	20:00	Final

== Records ==
Prior to this competition, the existing world, Asian and Games records were as follows.

World Record	Michael Phelps (USA)	1:51.51	Rome, Italy	29 July 2009
Asian Record	Takeshi Matsuda (JPN)	1:52.97	Beijing, China	13 August 2008
Games Record	Takeshi Matsuda (JPN)	1:54.02	Guangzhou, China	13 November 2010

== Results ==
=== Heats ===
Rank	Heat	Athlete	Time	Notes
1	2	Daiya Seto (JPN)	1:57.18	
2	1	Kenta Hirai (JPN)	1:59.74	
3	2	Hao Yun (CHN)	1:59.76	
4	1	Wang Pudong (CHN)	1:59.83	
5	1	Joseph Schooling (SIN)	1:59.92	
6	2	Hsu Chi-chieh (TPE)	2:01.38	
7	2	Chang Gyu-cheol (KOR)	2:01.81	
8	2	Ling Tin Yu (HKG)	2:03.89	
9	1	Aaron D'Souza (IND)	2:04.74	
10	1	David Wong (HKG)	2:11.09	
11	2	Ali Ashkanani (KUW)	2:12.84	

=== Final ===
Rank	Athlete	Time	Notes
1st place, gold medalist(s)	Daiya Seto (JPN)	1:54.08	
2nd place, silver medalist(s)	Kenta Hirai (JPN)	1:55.47	
3rd place, bronze medalist(s)	Joseph Schooling (SIN)	1:57.54	
4	Wang Pudong (CHN)	1:57.80	
5	Hao Yun (CHN)	1:58.82	
6	Chang Gyu-cheol (KOR)	1:59.93	
6	Hsu Chi-chieh (TPE)	1:59.93	
8	Ling Tin Yu (HKG)	2:03.24	
