= Svetlana Klyuchnikova =

Kazakhstani rugby union player

- Born: 27 June 1984 (age 42)
- Height: 1.64 m (5 ft 5 in)
- Weight: 60 kg (132 lb)

Rugby union career
- Position: Fullback
International career
Years	Team	Apps	(Points)
	Kazakhstan		(0)

Svetlana Klyuchnikova (Светлана Михайловна Ключникова, born 27 June 1984) is a former Kazakh rugby union and sevens player. She played internationally for Kazakhstan and competed at the 2006, 2010 and 2014 Women's Rugby World Cup's. She also won a gold medal at the 2010 Asian Games.

== Rugby career ==
Klyuchnikova competed in three Rugby World Cup's for Kazakhstan, that is, in the 2006, 2010 and 2014 tournaments.

She competed in rugby sevens and won a gold medal at the 2010 Asian Games in Guangzhou, China. She also participated in the 2014 and 2018 Asian Games.

Klyuchnikova featured for Kazakhstan at the 2019 Hong Kong Women's Sevens.

=== Coaching ===
Klyuchnikova was an assistant coach for Kazakhstan at the 2021 Rugby World Cup final qualification tournament in Dubai.
