= Yuka Kanematsu =

Japanese rugby sevens player

- Born: June 17, 1982 (age 44) Ichinomiya, Aichi, Japan
- Height: 1.59 m (5 ft 3 in)
- Weight: 59 kg (130 lb)
- University: Aichi University of Education

Rugby union career
- Current team: Nagoya ladies RFC
Senior career
Years	Team	Apps	(Points)
–	Nagoya ladies RFC		
National sevens team
Years	Team		Comps
–	Japan 7s		
Medal record
Women's rugby sevens
Representing Japan
Asian Games
Silver medal – second place	2014 Incheon	Team competition

Yuka Kanematsu (兼松 由香, Kanematsu Yuka; born June 17, 1982) is a Japanese rugby sevens player. She competed in the 2016 Summer Olympics for the Japanese women's rugby sevens team. She was also part of the squad that won a silver medal at the 2014 Asian Games in Incheon, South Korea.
