= Ano Kuwai =

- Born: October 20, 1989 (age 37) Hokkaido, Japan
- Height: 1.72 m (5 ft 8 in)
- Weight: 70 kg (154 lb)

Rugby union career
National sevens team
Years	Team	Comps
2014-	Japan 7s	
Medal record
Women's rugby sevens
Representing Japan
Asian Games
Gold medal – first place	2018 Jakarta–Palembang	Team
Silver medal – second place	2014 Incheon	Team

Ano Kuwai (桑井 亜乃, Kuwai Ano; born October 20, 1989) is a Japanese rugby union referee and former sevens player. She played for Japan's women's rugby sevens team and competed at the 2016 Summer Olympics

== Rugby career ==
=== Player ===
Kuwai competed at the 2016 Summer Olympics as part of the Japan women's national rugby sevens team. She became the first Japanese rugby player to score a try at an Olympic Game.

=== Referee ===
Kuwai will create history as the first to both play and referee sevens in the Olympics. She was one of six women who were selected to officiate in the 2024 Summer Olympics.
