= Chiharu Nakamura =

Japanese rugby sevens player

- Born: April 25, 1988 (age 38) Kanagawa, Japan
- Height: 1.62 m (5 ft 4 in)
- Weight: 64 kg (141 lb)

Rugby union career
National sevens team
Years	Team	Comps
2013–Present	Japan	
Medal record
Women's rugby sevens
Representing Japan
Asian Games
Gold medal – first place	2018 Jakarta–Palembang	Team
Silver medal – second place	2014 Incheon	Team
Silver medal – second place	2022 Hangzhou	Team

Chiharu Nakamura (中村 知春, Nakamura Chiharu; born April 25, 1988) is a Japanese rugby sevens player.

== Early career ==
In 2010, Nakamura graduated with a Bachelor's degree from the Faculty of Career Design at the Ichigaya Campus of Hosei University.

== Rugby career ==
Nakamura made her international sevens debut for Japan at the 2013 USA Women's Sevens in Houston.

Nakamura led the Japan's women's sevens team at the 2016 Summer Olympics. She has competed for the Sakura Sevens team at three Rugby World Cup Sevens tournaments in 2013, 2018 and 2022.

Nakamura won silver at the 2014 Asian Games. She competed at the 2022 Rugby World Cup Sevens in Cape Town.

She also competed at the 2024 Summer Olympics in Paris.
