= Zhang Yuhan =

Chinese swimmer (born 1995)

Personal information
- National team: China
- Born: 6 January 1995 (age 31)
- Height: 1.73 m (5 ft 8 in)

Sport
- Sport: Swimming
- Strokes: Freestyle
Medal record
Women's swimming
Representing China
World Championships (LC)
Silver medal – second place	2017 Budapest	4×200 m freestyle
Bronze medal – third place	2015 Kazan	4×200 m freestyle
World Championships (SC)
Gold medal – first place	2018 Hangzhou	4×200 m freestyle
Asian Games
Gold medal – first place	2014 Incheon	400 m freestyle
Gold medal – first place	2018 Jakarta	4×200 m freestyle

Zhang Yuhan (born 6 January 1995) is a Chinese competitive swimmer who specializes in freestyle.

== Career ==
At the 2015 World Aquatics Championships in Kazan, she won a bronze medal in the 4×200 m freestyle relay for swimming in the heats.

Zhang won the gold medal in the 400 meter freestyle at the 2014 Asian Games in Incheon, South Korea.

She qualified for the 2016 Summer Olympics in Rio de Janeiro in the 400 meter and 800 meter freestyle events. She swam the 9th time in the heats of the 400 meter and did not reach the final.
