= Mifuyu Koide =

Japanese rugby union player

- Born: December 21, 1995 (age 30) Kanagawa, Japan
- Height: 1.65 m (5 ft 5 in)
- Weight: 59 kg (130 lb)

Rugby union career
National sevens team
Years	Team	Comps
- Japan
Medal record
Women's rugby sevens
Representing Japan
Asian Games
Silver medal – second place	2014 Incheon	Team competition

Mifuyu Koide (小出 深冬, Koide Mifuyu; born December 21, 1995) is a Japanese rugby sevens player. She competed at the 2016 Summer Olympics for the Japan women's national rugby sevens team. Japan finished in 10th place overall. She was named in the Sakura Sevens squad to compete at the 2022 Rugby World Cup Sevens in Cape Town.
