= Noriko Taniguchi =

Japanese rugby union player

- Born: September 7, 1992 (age 34) Kanagawa, Japan
- Height: 1.66 m (5 ft 5 in)
- Weight: 66 kg (146 lb)

Rugby union career
National sevens team
| Years | Team | Comps |
| 2014- | Japan 7s | |
Medal record
Women's rugby sevens
Representing Japan
Asian Games
| Gold medal – first place | 2018 Jakarta–Palembang | Team |
| Silver medal – second place | 2014 Incheon | Team |

Noriko Taniguchi (谷口 令子, Taniguchi Noriko; born September 7, 1992) is a Japanese rugby sevens player. She was a member of the Japan women's national rugby sevens team at the 2016 Summer Olympics. She won a silver medal at the 2014 Asian Games in rugby sevens.
