= Chisato Yokoo =

Japanese rugby sevens player

- Born: May 22, 1992 (age 34) Tokyo, Japan
- Height: 1.64 m (5 ft 5 in)
- Weight: 60 kg (132 lb)
- University: Waseda University

Rugby union career
- Current team: Tokyo Phoenix RC
National sevens team
Years	Team	Comps
2014-	Japan 7s	
Medal record
Women's rugby sevens
Representing Japan
Asian Games
Silver medal – second place	2014 Incheon	Team

Chisato Yokoo (横尾 千里, Yokoo Chisato; born May 22, 1992) is a female Japanese rugby sevens player. She was part of Japan's sevens team that won silver at the 2014 Asian Games. She played at the 2016 Summer Olympics as a member of the Japan women's national rugby sevens team.

Yokoo was part of the Sakura sevens team that played in a curtain raiser match against Australia ahead of the 2015 Rugby Championship match between the Wallabies and the All Blacks in Sydney.
