= Ayaka Suzuki =

Japan international rugby union player

- Born: September 30, 1989 (age 37) Yokohama, Kanagawa, Japan
- Height: 1.68 m (5 ft 6 in)
- Weight: 67 kg (148 lb; 10 st 8 lb)

Rugby union career
- Position: Back Row
International career
Years	Team	Apps	(Points)
2008–2022	Japan	18	(100)
National sevens team
Years	Team		Comps
2012	Japan		21

Ayaka Suzuki (鈴木 彩香, Suzuki Ayaka; born September 30, 1989) is a Japanese rugby union and sevens player. She competed at the Rio Olympics as part of Japan's women's sevens team, and has also featured at two Rugby World Cup's in 2017 and 2021.

== Rugby career ==
=== Sevens ===
Suzuki was part of the Japanese sevens team that competed at the 2012 and 2013 USA Women's Sevens. She represented Japan at the 2016 Summer Olympics in Brazil.

=== Fifteens ===
Suzuki was named in Japan's squad to the 2017 Rugby World Cup in Ireland. Since November 2020, she plays for Wasps Women in the Premier 15s. She was selected in Japan's squad for the delayed 2021 Rugby World Cup in New Zealand.
