= Rowan Varty =

Hong Kong international rugby union player

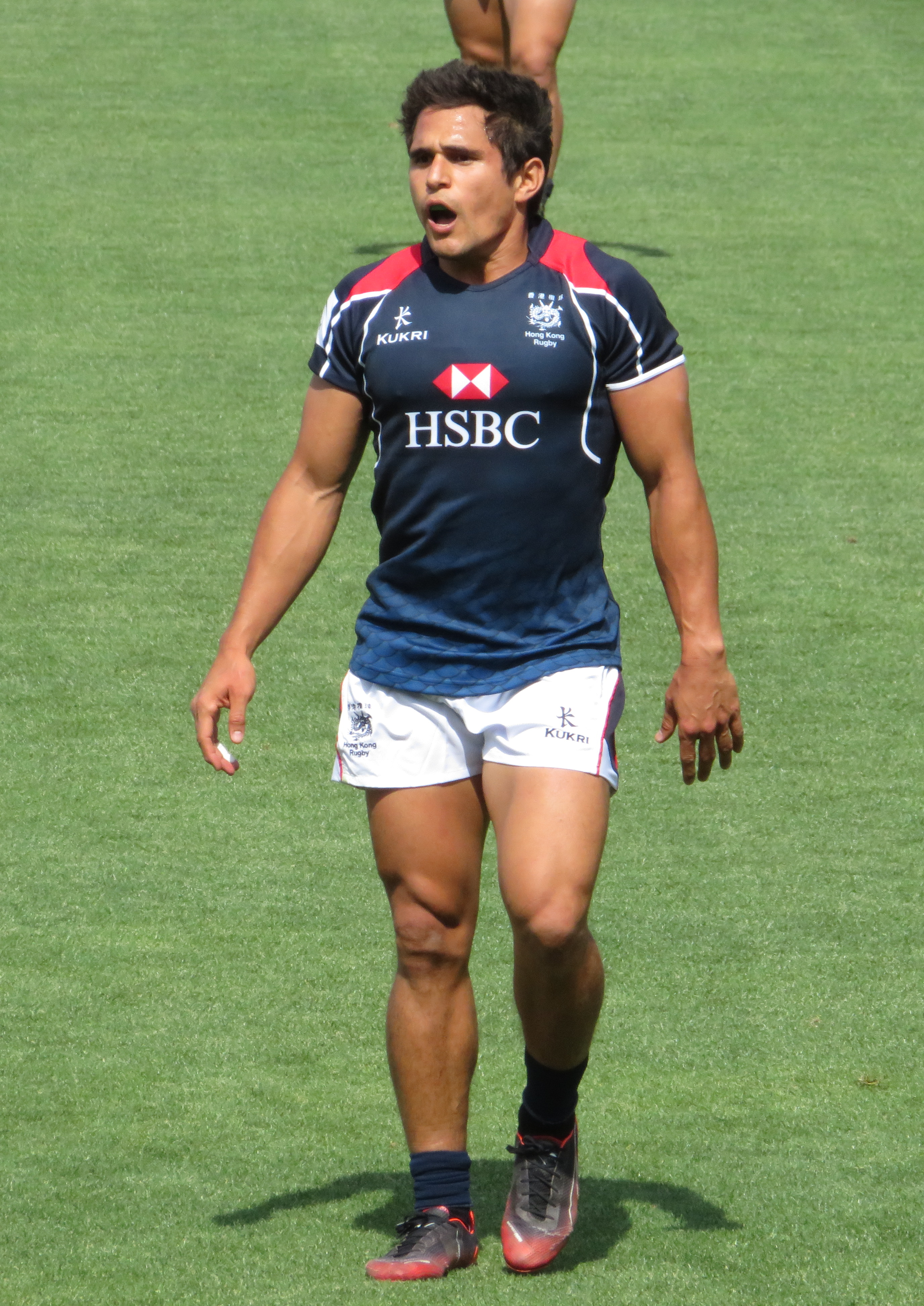
- Born: Rowan Varty; 20 March 1986 (age 40) London, England
- Height: 1.73 m (5 ft 8 in)
- Weight: 81 kg (12 st 11 lb)

Rugby union career
- Position: Wing or full-back
International career
Years	Team	Apps	(Points)
2008–2017	Hong Kong	43	(120)
2013	Barbarians	1	(0)

Rowan Varty (born 20 March 1986) is a British-born Hong Kong former rugby union player. He is the all-time top point scorer for the Hong Kong national rugby union team, whom he also captained. Additionally, he represented the Hong Kong Sevens team and was selected to play for the Barbarians. His sister, Lindsay, represents Hong Kong in the rugby sevens women's team.

== Youth and education ==
Born in London to a British father and a Chinese-Portuguese mother, Varty grew up in Hong Kong, where he attended King George V School before attending the University of Nottingham to study law and attending the University of Hong Kong for postgraduate studies.

In December 2013, after having completed a 2-year apprenticeship with Hong Kong law firm, Tanner De Witt, Varty decided to take a sabbatical from his legal career. He was one of 40 players inducted into the Hong Kong Sports Institute, with the prospect of representing Hong Kong in the Olympics, and now works full-time as a PE teacher at King George V School.

== Play ==
Varty nominally plays back at 15-a-side rugby, and takes wing or full-back positions for his club, DeA Tigers, as well as at Asian level. Varty led the King George V School (KGV) in their 21-5 victory over Island School in the 2004 Bill Williams Schoolboy Rugby Sevens. Varty made his international début for the Hong Kong at the age of 18 when he joined a match against Singapore as a substitute. Having spent considerable effort to acquire a Hong Kong passport, he eventually acquired one in 2013.

Varty has represented Hong Kong in three Rugby Sevens world cup tournaments – Hong Kong (2005) and Dubai (2009) and Russia (2013).

Varty was selected in April 2013 for the Barbarians squad to play England and the British and Irish Lions, becoming the first Hong Kong rugby player to play at this level. He appeared in the match against England, where he came off the bench and replaced Timoci Nagusa to win his first Barbarian cap.

As of October 2020, Rowan Varty is the Hong Kong national team's highest all-time scorer with 120 points as well as their all-time leader in top try with 24 of them.
