= Lindsay Varty =

- Born: June 8, 1988 (age 38)
- Height: 1.62 m (5 ft 4 in)
- Weight: 58 kg (128 lb)

Rugby union career
- Position: Scrum Half
International career
Years	Team	Apps	(Points)
- Hong Kong
National sevens team
Years	Team		Comps
2005	Hong Kong		

Lindsay Varty (born 8 June 1988) is a Hong Kong rugby union player. She competed at the 2017 Women's Rugby World Cup, it was Hong Kong's first appearance in a World Cup.

== Biography ==
Varty is of English and Macanese descent. She began playing rugby at the age of 12. She first joined Hong Kong's sevens team at 17 and was a mainstay for 13 years. Her older brother, Rowan, has also represented Hong Kong internationally in fifteens and sevens.
