= Kazakhstan Rugby Union =

Governing body for rugby union in Kazakhstan

Qazaqstan Rugby
- Sport: Rugby union
- World Rugby affiliation: 1997
- President: Aigul Jartybayeva
- Website: kaz-rugby.kz

The Kazakhstan Rugby Union is the governing body for rugby union in Kazakhstan. It is a full member of World Rugby.

The Union organises the Kazakhstan national rugby union team, known as the Nomads.

== See also ==
- Rugby union in Kazakhstan
