= Christy Gunn =

HK international rugby union player

- Born: 26 November 1985 (age 40)
- Height: 1.68 m (5 ft 6 in)
- Weight: 69 kg (152 lb)

Rugby union career
International career
| Years | Team | Apps | (Points) |
- Hong Kong
National sevens team
| Years | Team | | Comps |
- Hong Kong

Christy Gunn (born 26 November 1985) is a Hong Kong rugby union player. She represented Hong Kong when they debuted at the 2017 Rugby World Cup in Ireland.

== Rugby career ==
=== Sevens ===
She was selected for the Hong Kong sevens team as they sought to secure a core team spot for the 2015–2016 Sevens Series. In November, she was called up for the sevens team in the 2015 Asia Sevens Championships which was a qualification series for the 2016 Summer Olympics.

In January 2018, Gunn was named as co-captain of the sevens team when they competed at the Fiji Coral Coast 7s. She also captained the side when they competed at the 2018 Borneo Sevens in March as preparation for the Sevens Series Qualifier in April. (Note: "Hong Kong Sevens Squads Warm Up For The Hong Kong 7s at Borneo Sevens". Asia Rugby. 2018-03-15.) She captained the squad again at the 2018 Hong Kong Women's Sevens which was a qualifier for the 2018–19 sevens series.

=== XVs ===
Gunn captained Hong Kong at the 2015 Asia Rugby Women's Championship. She was named in Hong Kong's training squad and then featured at the 2017 World Cup repechage tournament against Fiji and Japan. She eventually made the squad and competed for Hong Kong in their first Rugby World Cup appearance in 2017. (Note: Varty, Lindsay (2017-09-09). "Hong Kong team make history at the 2017 Women's Rugby World Cup". Hong Kong Free Press.) (Note: "Hong Kong aiming to create legacy at World Cup". Rugby World Cup. 2017-07-22.)

== Personal life ==
Gunn and her husband, Stuart, married in 2017.
