= Keiko Kato =

Japan international rugby union player

- Born: 7 August 1988 (age 38)
- Height: 162 cm (5 ft 4 in)
- Weight: 61 kg (134 lb; 9 st 8 lb)

Rugby union career
- Position: Center
Senior career
Years	Team	Apps	(Points)
- Setagaya Ladies
International career
Years	Team	Apps	(Points)
- Japan
National sevens team
Years	Team		Comps
2008–	Japan 7s		
Medal record
Women's rugby sevens
Representing Japan
Asian Games
Silver medal – second place	2014 Incheon	Team

Keiko Kato (born 7 August 1988) is a Japanese rugby union player. She competed for Japan at the 2017 Women's Rugby World Cup.

== Early life and career ==
Kato started playing rugby at the age of seven. She played basketball in Josho Gakuen Junior High School. After graduating from Josho Gakuen High School in 2007, she entered Hosei University.

== Rugby career ==
In 2008, she made her international debut for the Japanese women's sevens team at the Hong Kong Sevens. A year later, she appeared for the Japanese sevens side in the Sevens World Cup in Dubai.

In 2010, she studied abroad in England, and also played for the Richmond Rugby Club for a year.

After graduating from Hosei University in 2012, she worked for Mitsubishi Heavy Industries, and also played for the Setagaya Ladies rugby club.

Kato won a silver medal at the 2014 Asian Games. In 2016, she was selected as a non-travelling reserve for the Japanese sevens team for the Rio Olympics.

In 2017, she featured for the Sakura fifteens in the Asian Women's Championship ahead of the World Cup. She subsequently made the Sakura fifteens side for the Women's Rugby World Cup in Ireland.
