= Kana Mitsugi =

Japanese rugby sevens player (born 1992)

Personal information
- Born: June 28, 1992 (age 33) Hyuga, Miyazaki, Japan
- Height: 1.72 m (5 ft 7 1/2 in)
- Weight: 72 kg (159 lb; 11 st 5 lb)

Sport
- Country: Japan
- Sport: Rugby sevens

Kana Mitsugi (三樹 加奈, Mitsugi Kana; born June 28, 1992) is a Japanese rugby sevens player. She was a member of the Japan women's national rugby sevens team that competed at the 2016 Summer Olympics.

Mitsugi was a member of the Japanese sevens team that played at the 2016 France Women's Sevens in Clermont-Ferrand, France.
