= Aggie Poon =

Hong Kong rugby union player

- Born: 2 January 1990 (age 36)
- Height: 1.76 m (5 ft 9 in)
- Weight: 68 kg (150 lb)

Rugby union career
International career
Years	Team	Apps	(Points)
	Hong Kong	13	(0)
National sevens team
Years	Team		Comps
- Hong Kong

Aggie Poon Pak-yan (born 2 January 1990) is a Hong Kong rugby union referee and former player. She competed for Hong Kong when they debuted at the 2017 Women's Rugby World Cup.

== Rugby career ==
Poon has represented Hong Kong in fifteens and sevens at international level. She is a former 110 metre hurdler.

Poon competed for Hong Kong in their debut appearance at the 2017 Women's Rugby World Cup in Ireland. She played 13 games for Hong Kong before she was made to retire, due to an injured knee. She took up refereeing after her retirement.
