= Yu Xiaoming =

Chinese rugby sevens player

Personal information
- Nationality: Chinese
- Born: 8 November 1993 (age 32) Weifang, China

Sport
- Sport: Rugby sevens

Yu Xiaoming (born 8 November 1993) is a Chinese rugby sevens player. She competed in the women's tournament at the 2020 Summer Olympics.
