= Marie Yamaguchi =

Japanese rugby sevens player (born 1989)

- Born: 22 October 1989 (age 37) Yokohama, Kanagawa, Japan
- Height: 159 cm (5 ft 3 in)
- Weight: 55 kg (121 lb)

Rugby union career
- Position: Winger
- Current team: Rugirl-7
National sevens team
Years	Team	Comps
10	Japan	
- Correct as of 8 August 2016
Medal record
Women's rugby sevens
Representing Japan
Asian Games
Silver medal – second place	2014 Incheon	Team competition

Marie Yamaguchi (山口真理恵; born 22 October 1989) is a Japanese rugby sevens player. She plays as a Winger.

== Career ==
Yamaguchi started to play tag rugby when she was ten years old. Her coach Keiko Asami taught her to play rugby when she was twelve. Yamaguchi was also a member of a track and field club for three years at junior high school, in which she did sprint and jump. She was good at that level but could not attend the Nations due to injury from rugby training. Yamaguchi was a member of the Yokohama Rugby Academy until she was fifteen years old. She joined Tokyo Phoenix when she was sixteen. She was also selected as a national team player.

Yamaguchi went to Australia as an exchange student when she was nineteen years old, where she played for the Women's Club Team of the University of Sydney for three years. After graduating, she had a short stint at the Huia rugby football in New Zealand in 2012. Yamaguchi then returned to Japan and started working full-time as an office worker. In 2012, she joined Rugirl-7, where she attended rugby practices three times a week and in the weekend she attended training camps or rugby practices as a member of the Japanese national team.

Throughout her career, Yamaguchi was a regular for the Japanese rugby national team. She represented Japan at Asia Sevens in 2007, 2009 and 2010, Asian Rugby Union Game in 2008, Sevens World Cup in 2009, the Asian World Cup Qualification in 2009 and the Asian Four Nations in China in 2012. Yamaguchi was part of the Japanese rugby sevens national team that won silver in the 2014 Asian Games. Yamaguchi also took part in the 2016 Rio Olympics, in which she participated in the Rugby sevens event. Although Japan did not win any medals, Yamaguchi scored two tries against Kenya.

In April 2017, Marie Yamaguchi announced her retirement from rugby. She got married in March 2017 and has since relocated to Brazil with her family.
