= Makiko Tomita =

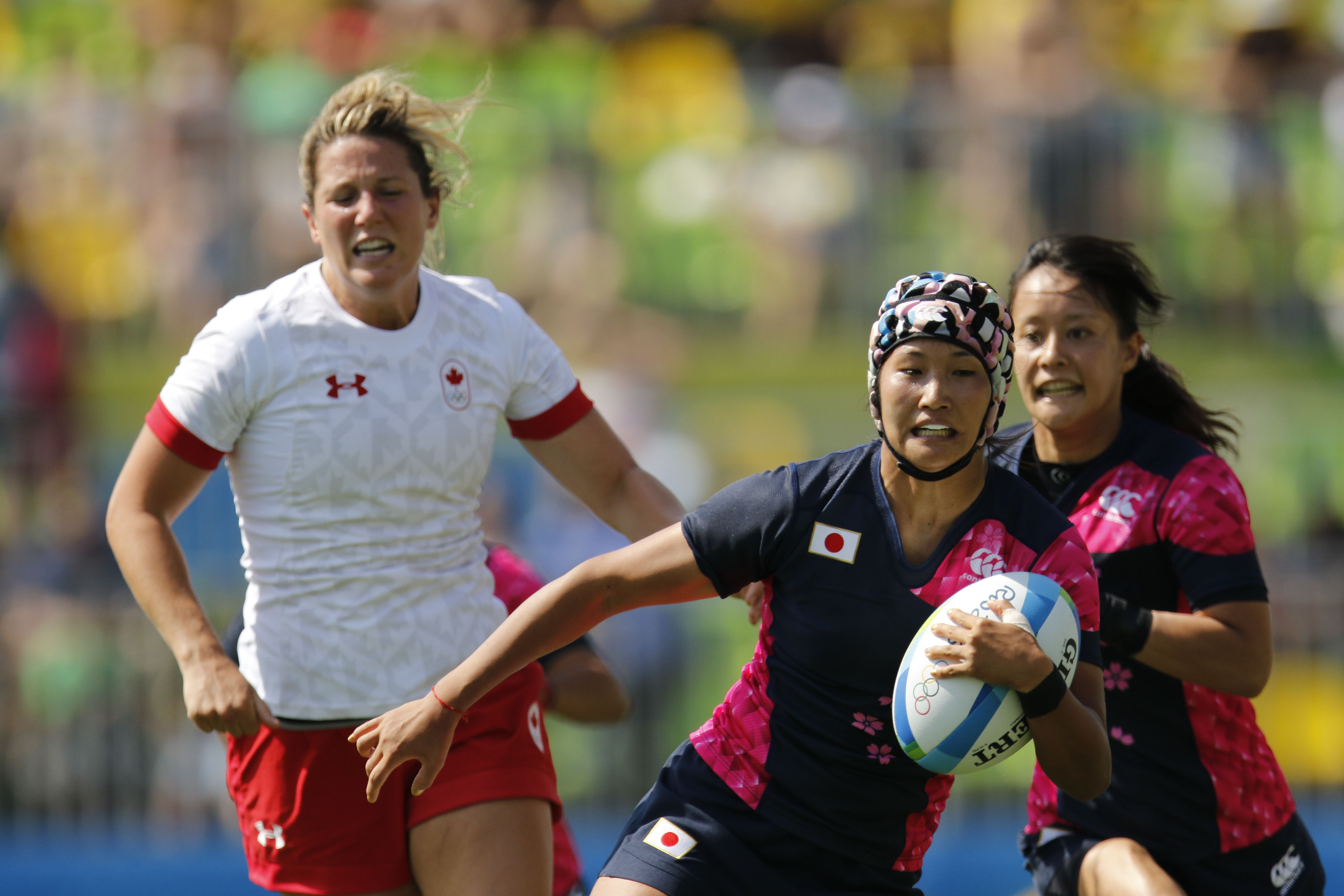
- Tomita, as seen in the centre
- Born: August 2, 1991 (age 35) Okayama, Japan
- Height: 1.70 m (5 ft 7 in)
- Weight: 68 kg (150 lb)

Rugby union career
- Position: Centre
International career
Years	Team	Apps	(Points)
2010	Japan	4	(5)
National sevens team
Years	Team		Comps
2010	Japan		
Medal record
Women's rugby sevens
Representing Japan
Asian Games
Silver medal – second place	2014 Incheon	Team competition

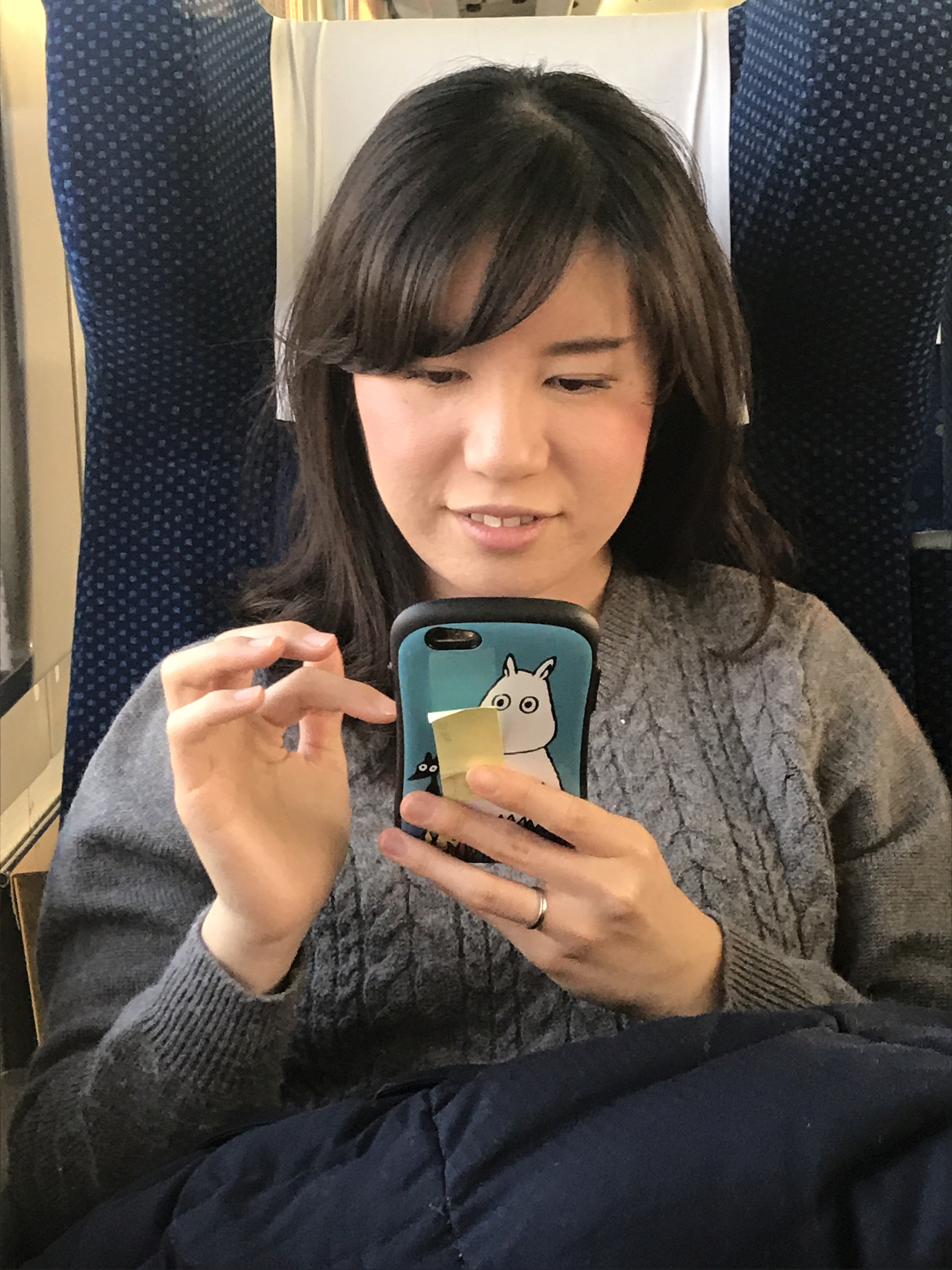
Makiko Tomita in 2018

Makiko Tomita (冨田 真紀子, Tomita Makiko; born August 2, 1991) is a Japanese rugby union and sevens player. She represented Japan at the 2016 Summer Olympics and competed at the 2017 Rugby World Cup in Ireland.

== Early career ==
Tomita studied at Waseda University in the School of International Liberal Studies in Japan.

== Rugby career ==
=== Sevens ===
Tomita competed at the 2010 Asian Games in China. She competed at the 2016 Summer Olympics as a member of the Japan women's national rugby sevens team.

=== XVs ===
Tomita was named in the Japanese squad for the 2017 Rugby World Cup. She was cited for a dangerous tackle in their match against France. After she returned from a three-match suspension, she helped the Sakura XVs beat Hong Kong in their final World Cup match.

In 2021, she had a stint with French club Lons Section Paloise; she became the first Japanese to compete in the Élite 1 competition.
