= List of Olympic medal leaders in men's gymnastics =

== Gymnasts ==
=== Total Medals ===
Total medals	Gymnast	Nation	Years	Gold	Silver	Bronze	Rank
15	Nikolai Andrianov	Soviet Union	1972, 1976, 1980	7	5	3	1
13	Boris Shakhlin	Soviet Union	1956, 1960, 1964	7	4	2	2
13	Takashi Ono	Japan	1952, 1956, 1960, 1964	5	4	4	2
12	Sawao Kato	Japan	1968, 1972, 1976	8	3	1	4
12	Alexei Nemov	Russia	1996, 2000, 2004	4	2	6	4
11	Viktor Chukarin	Soviet Union	1952, 1956	7	3	1	6
10	Akinori Nakayama	Japan	1968, 1972	6	2	2	7
10	Vitaly Scherbo	Belarus Unified Team	1992, 1996	6	0	4	7
10	Alexander Dityatin	Soviet Union	1976, 1980	3	6	1	7
9	Mitsuo Tsukahara	Japan	1968, 1972, 1976	5	1	3	10
9	Eizo Kenmotsu	Japan	1968, 1972, 1976	3	3	3	10
9	Mikhail Voronin	Soviet Union	1968, 1972	2	6	1	10
9	Heikki Savolainen	Finland	1928, 1932, 1936, 1948, 1952	2	1	6	10
9	Yuri Titov	Soviet Union	1956, 1960, 1964	1	5	3	10
8	Georges Miez	Switzerland	1924, 1928, 1932, 1936	4	3	1	15
8	Eugen Mack	Switzerland	1928, 1936	2	4	2	15
7	Yukio Endo	Japan	1960, 1964, 1968	5	2	0	17
7	Kōhei Uchimura	Japan	2008, 2012, 2016	3	4	0	17
7	Josef Stalder	Switzerland	1948, 1952	1	3	3	17
7	Masao Takemoto	Japan	1952, 1956, 1960	1	3	3	17
7	Denis Ablyazin	Russia ROC	2012, 2016, 2020	1	4	2	17
6	Anton Heida	United States	1904	5	1	0	22
6	Zou Kai	China	2008, 2012	5	0	1	22
6	Leon Štukelj	Yugoslavia	1924, 1928, 1936	3	2	1	22
6	Max Whitlock	Great Britain	2012, 2016, 2020	3	0	3	22
6	Hermann Weingärtner	Germany	1896	3	2	1	22
6	Li Ning	China	1984	3	2	1	22
6	George Eyser	United States	1904	3	2	1	22
6	Alfred Schwarzmann	Germany Germany	1936, 1952	3	1	2	22
6	Shuji Tsurumi	Japan	1960, 1964	2	3	1	22
6	Li Xiaoshuang	China	1992, 1996	2	3	1	22
6	Hrihoriy Misyutin	Ukraine Unified Team	1992, 1996	1	4	1	22
5	Li Xiaopeng	China	2000, 2004, 2008	4	1	0	33
5	Vladimir Artemov	Soviet Union	1988	4	1	0	33
5	Giorgio Zampori	Italy	1912, 1920, 1924	4	0	1	33
5	Yang Wei	China	2000, 2008	3	2	0	33
5	Veikko Huhtanen	Finland	1948	3	1	1	33
5	Paavo Aaltonen	Finland	1948, 1952	3	0	2	33
5	Zou Jingyuan	China	2020, 2024	2	2	1	33
5	Lou Yun	China	1984, 1988	2	2	1	33
5	Kōji Gushiken	Japan	1984	2	1	2	33
5	Viktor Klimenko	Soviet Union	1968, 1972	1	3	1	33
5	Andreas Wecker	Germany East Germany	1988, 1992, 1996	1	2	2	33
5	Roland Brückner	Germany	1976, 1980	1	1	3	33
5	Franco Menichelli	Italy	1960, 1964	1	1	3	33
5	Viktor Lisitsky	Soviet Union	1992, 1996	0	5	0	33
5	Xiao Ruoteng	China	2020, 2024	0	2	3	33

=== Individual Medals ===
Individual Medals	Gymnast	Nation	Years	Gold	Silver	Bronze	Rank
12	Nikolai Andrianov	Soviet Union	1972, 1976, 1980	6	3	3	1
10	Boris Shakhlin	Soviet Union	1956, 1960, 1964	6	1	3	2
10	Takashi Ono	Japan	1952, 1956, 1960, 1964	3	3	4	2
10	Alexei Nemov	Russia	1996, 2000, 2004	3	2	5	2
9	Sawao Kato	Japan	1968, 1972, 1976	5	3	1	5
9	Viktor Chukarin	Soviet Union	1952, 1956	5	3	1	5
9	Vitaly Scherbo	Belarus Unified Team	1992, 1996	5	0	4	5
8	Akinori Nakayama	Japan	1968, 1972	4	2	2	8
8	Alexander Dityatin	Soviet Union	1976, 1980	2	5	1	8
7
7	Mikhail Voronin	Soviet Union	1968, 1972	2	4	1	10
6
6	George Eyser	United States	1904	3	2	1	11
6	Mitsuo Tsukahara	Japan	1968, 1972, 1976	2	1	3	11
6	Eugen Mack	Switzerland	1928, 1936	1	3	2	11
6	Eizo Kenmotsu	Japan	1968, 1972, 1976	0	3	3	11
6	Yuri Titov	Soviet Union	1956, 1960, 1964	0	3	3	11
5
5	Anton Heida	United States	1904	4	1	0	16
5	Georges Miez	Switzerland	1924, 1928, 1932, 1936	3	2	0	16
5	Li Ning	China	1984	3	1	1	16
5	Leon Štukelj	Yugoslavia	1924, 1928, 1936	3	1	1	16
5	Max Whitlock	Great Britain	2012, 2016, 2020	3	0	2	16
5	Alfred Schwarzmann	Germany Germany	1936, 1952	2	1	2	16
5	Josef Stalder	Switzerland	1948, 1952	1	1	3	16
5	Heikki Savolainen	Finland	1928, 1932, 1936, 1948, 1952	1	1	3	16
5	Denis Ablyazin	Russia ROC	2012, 2016, 2020	0	3	2	16
5	Masao Takemoto	Japan	1952, 1956, 1960	0	2	3	16
4	Vladimir Artemov	Soviet Union	1988	3	1	0	26
4	Zou Kai	China	2008, 2012	3	0	1	26
4	Yukio Endo	Japan	1960, 1964, 1968	2	2	0	26
4	Kōhei Uchimura	Japan	2008, 2012, 2016	2	2	0	26
4	István Pelle	Hungary	1932	2	2	0	26
4	Veikko Huhtanen	Finland	1948	2	1	1	26
4	Lou Yun	China	1984, 1988	2	1	1	26
4	Kōji Gushiken	Japan	1984	2	1	1	26
4	Li Xiaoshuang	China	1992, 1996	2	1	1	26
4	Hermann Weingärtner	Germany	1896	1	2	1	26
4	Franco Menichelli	Italy	1960, 1964	1	1	2	26
4	Andreas Wecker	Germany	1992, 1996	1	1	2	26
4	Hrihoriy Misyutin	Ukraine Unified Team	1992, 1996	0	4	0	26
4	Shuji Tsurumi	Japan	1960, 1964	0	3	1	26
4	Yordan Yovchev	Bulgaria	2000, 2004	0	1	3	26

== See also ==
- List of male artistic gymnasts with the most appearances at Olympic Games
- List of multiple Olympic medalists at a single Games
