= Gymnastics at the 2012 Summer Olympics – Men's floor =

Men's artistic gymnastics floor exercise at the Games of the XXX Olympiad
- Venue: North Greenwich Arena
- Date: 5 August 2012
- Competitors: 8 from 8 nations
- Winning score: 15.933 - Zou Kai

Medalists
1st place, gold medalist(s)		Zou Kai	China
2nd place, silver medalist(s)		Kōhei Uchimura	Japan
3rd place, bronze medalist(s)		Denis Ablyazin	Russia

== Background ==
The men's floor exercise was an individual competition held during the 2012 Summer Olympics, as a part of the artistic events in regards to gymnastics. This competition only lasted for one day, on August 5 of 2012. This medal placement round took place in the North Greenwich Arena, in London, United Kingdom. With the qualification round taking place on July 28, of 2012.

== Competitors ==
The following 11 athletes had competed in a preliminary qualifier, in which the top 8 would move on to the medal placement final. They are listed as the following:

- Alexander Shatilov - Israel
- Jake Dalton - United States
- Zou Kai - China
- Kōhei Uchimura - Japan
- Flavius Koczi - Romania
- Tomás González - Chile
- Marcel Nguyen - Germany
- Denis Ablyazin - Russia
- Ryōhei Katō - Japan
- Gaël da Silva - France
- Kristian Thomas - Great Britain

== Competition format ==
The top eight competitors in the qualification phase (with a limit of two per country) advanced to the apparatus final. The floor exercise competition functions as follows. Previously mentioned already, 11 athletes are required to pass a qualifier, in which the top 8 of the individual apparatus floor round then move on to the medal placement final. While athletes number 9, 10, and 11 are essentially reserves in case any athlete above them are unable to compete for whatever reason.

Once an athlete were to qualify, their score does not matter, only the total score does once they finish their set.

Obtained from the official Olympic's website, the description for artistic gymnastics is; "Introduced in 1894, artistic gymnastics was one of the original disciplines in the modern Olympic Games. Artistic gymnasts are challenged to perfect their skills across a range of equipment, such as the beam and performing on the floor."

The floor competition, more specifically the individual competition is quoted from the official Olympics website once more; "The men, meanwhile, take to the floor in a hushed arena, take a deep breath and then bomb down the diagonal for their first tumble, one of three or four passes, like the women. They also have to perform moves that demonstrate strength, flexibility and balance and use the whole of the floor area in a time period of between 50 seconds and 1 min 10s (no more than 90 seconds-long for women).

== Qualification results ==
Rank	Gymnast	Nation	D Score	E Score	Pen.	Total	Qual.
1	Zou Kai	China	6.900	8.933		15.833	Q
2	Kōhei Uchimura	Japan	6.700	9.066		15.766	Q
3	Flavius Koczi	Romania	6.700	8.966		15.666	Q
4	Alexander Shatilov	Israel	6.600	9.033		15.633*	Q
4	Jake Dalton	United States	6.600	9.033		15.633*	Q
6	Tomás González	Chile	6.500	9.033		15.533	Q
7	Marcel Nguyen	Germany	6.500	8.933		15.433*	Q
8	Denis Ablyazin	Russia	6.900	8.833	0.3	15.433*	Q
9	Ryōhei Katō	Japan	6.600	8.833		15.433*	R1
10	Gaël da Silva	France	6.500	8.900		15.400	R2
11	Kristian Thomas	Great Britain	6.300	9.066		15.366	R3

*You may notice that some athletes might have similar scores yet one is placed higher than the other, this is because when two or more athletes record the same total score, the one with the highest execution score finishes ahead. If the "E-score" is the same, then the one with the highest difficulty score finishes ahead. If the "D-score" is also the same, then they finish tied.

The following article explains in the event of a tie in the Olympics, how athletes can go about the medals. It does not apply to this specific scenario or game, it is simply a side piece of information in case you wonder how ties can work within the matter.

== Final ==
Rank	Gymnast	Nation	D Score	E Score	Pen.	Total
Gold medal	Zou Kai	China	6.900	9.033		15.933
Silver medal	Kōhei Uchimura	Japan	6.700	9.100		15.800*
Bronze medal	Denis Ablyazin	Russia	7.100	8.700		15.800*
4	Tomás González	Chile	6.500	8.866		15.366
5	Jake Dalton	United States	6.400	8.933		15.333*
6	Alexander Shatilov	Israel	6.600	8.733		15.333*
7	Flavius Koczi	Romania	6.700	8.500	0.1	15.100
8	Marcel Nguyen	Germany	6.600	8.466	0.1	14.966

*As mentioned previously, when two athletes record the same total score, the one with the higher execution score finishes ahead.

== Interesting facts ==
- Zou Kai - China was defending his title from the 2008 Summer Olympics.
- Alexander Shatilov - Israel competed in the previous Olympic games.
- Kōhei Uchimura - Japan also competed in the previous Olympic games.
