= 2012 European Artistic Gymnastics Championships =

The 2012 European Artistic Gymnastics Championships can refer to either or both of the following:

- The 29th European Women's Artistic Gymnastics Championships (held 9–13 May 2012 in Brussels, Belgium)
- The 30th European Men's Artistic Gymnastics Championships (held 23–27 May 2012 in Montpellier, France)
