= Gymnastics at the 2008 Summer Olympics – Men's floor =

Men's floor at the Games of the XXIX Olympiad

Medalists
1st place, gold medalist(s)		Zou Kai	China
2nd place, silver medalist(s)		Gervasio Deferr	Spain
3rd place, bronze medalist(s)		Anton Golotsutskov	Russia

Men's floor competition at the 2008 Summer Olympics was held on August 17 at the Beijing National Indoor Stadium.

The eight competitors (with a maximum of two per nation) with the highest scores in qualifying proceeded to the men's floor finals.

There, each gymnast performed again; the scores from the final round (ignoring qualification) determined the final ranking.

== Final ==
Position	Gymnast	Country	A Score	B Score	Penalty	Total
Gold medal	Zou Kai	China	6.700	9.350		16.050
Silver medal	Gervasio Deferr	Spain	6.500	9.275		15.775
Bronze medal	Anton Golotsutskov	Russia	6.500	9.225		15.725
4	Fabian Hambuechen	Germany	6.500	9.150		15.650
5	Kōhei Uchimura	Japan	6.300	9.275		15.575
6	Diego Hypólito	Brazil	6.700	8.500		15.200
7	Marian Drăgulescu	Romania	6.500	8.350		14.850
8	Alexander Shatilov	Israel	6.600	7.925	0.400	14.125

== Qualified competitors ==
Position	Gymnast	A Score	B Score	Penalty	Total
1st	Diego Hypólito (BRA)	6.600	9.350		15.950
2nd	Marian Drăgulescu (ROU)	6.900	9.025		15.925
3rd	Gervasio Deferr (ESP)	6.500	9.325		15.825
4th	Fabian Hambuechen (GER)	6.500	9.300		15.800
5th	Kōhei Uchimura (JPN)	6.500	9.225		15.725
6th	Zou Kai (CHN)	6.700	9.100	0.100	15.700
7th	Anton Golotsutskov (RUS)	6.500	9.100		15.600
8th	Alexander Shatilov (ISR)	6.600	9.000		15.600

=== Reserves ===
The reserves for the Floor event final were:

- Kim Soomyun (KOR) (9th place: 6.700 A, 8.875 B, 15.575 Total)
- Rafael Martinez (ESP) (10th place: 6.400 A, 9.150 B, 15.550 Total)
- Kyle Shewfelt (CAN) (11th place: 6.500 A, 9.025 B, 15.525 Total)
