= Gymnastics at the 2012 Summer Olympics – Men's artistic team all-around =

Men's artistic team all-around at the Games of the XXX Olympiad
- Venue: North Greenwich Arena

Medalists
1st place, gold medalist(s)		Chen Yibing; Feng Zhe; Guo Weiyang; Zhang Chenglong; Zou Kai	China
2nd place, silver medalist(s)		Ryōhei Katō; Kazuhito Tanaka; Yusuke Tanaka; Kōhei Uchimura; Koji Yamamuro	Japan
3rd place, bronze medalist(s)		Sam Oldham; Daniel Purvis; Louis Smith; Kristian Thomas; Max Whitlock	Great Britain

The final of the men's artistic gymnastics team all-around competition at the 2012 Olympic Games was held at the North Greenwich Arena on 30 July. Eight teams of five gymnasts competed, from a total of twelve teams that had qualified for the Games.

The eight teams with the best combined scores in the qualification round moved on to the final. In the final, each team selected three gymnasts to compete on each apparatus. All scores were summed to give a final team score.

China won the gold medal with a total score of 275.997. In second place with 271.952 points was Japan, and Great Britain took bronze with 271.711.

== Qualified teams ==
- China
- France
- Great Britain
- Germany
- Japan
- Russia
- Ukraine
- United States

== Final results ==
Team	Floor (gymnastics)		Pommel horse		Rings (gymnastics)		Vault (gymnastics)		Parallel bars		Horizontal bar		Total (All-around)	
Team	Score	Rank	Score	Rank	Score	Rank	Score	Rank	Score	Rank	Score	Rank	Score	Rank
China	45.133	5	43.833	4	44.899	5	48.316	1	46.750	1	47.066	1	275.997	1st place, gold medalist(s)
Chen Yibing (CHN)			14.733	11	15.800	2								
Feng Zhe (CHN)	14.400	21			14.533	20	16.216	4	15.950	1	15.000	14		
Guo Weiyang (CHN)			14.600	14	14.566	19			15.200	13				
Zhang Chenglong (CHN)	14.900	14	14.500	16			16.200	5	15.600	2	15.666	6		
Zou Kai (CHN)	15.833	1					15.900	12			16.400	1		
Japan	44.733	6	42.365	5	45.699	2	45.971	7	46.282	2	46.899	2	271.952	2nd place, silver medalist(s)
Ryōhei Katō (JPN)	15.300	8	14.766	9			16.041	9						
Kazuhito Tanaka (JPN)	13.733	24	13.433	19					15.366	10	15.166	12		
Yusuke Tanaka (JPN)					15.200	8			15.500	5	16.000	3		
Kōhei Uchimura (JPN)	15.700	2	14.166^{1}	18	15.133	9	15.900	12	15.416	8	15.733	5		
Koji Yamamuro (JPN)					15.366	5	14.033	24						
Great Britain	46.132	1	45.932	1	43.066	8	48.182	2	44.566	7	43.833	7	271.711	3rd place, bronze medalist(s)
Sam Oldham (GBR)					14.033	24			14.966	18	14.000	22		
Daniel Purvis (GBR)	15.533	3	14.733	11	14.600	18	15.966	10	14.800	19	14.633	18		
Louis Smith (GBR)			15.966	1										
Kristian Thomas (GBR)	15.433	6			14.433	22	16.550	1			15.200	10		
Max Whitlock (GBR)	15.166	11	15.233	3			15.666	16	14.800	19				
Ukraine	44.065	8	44.966	3	45.699	2	48.065	3	44.733	6	43.998	6	271.526	4
Nikolai Kuksenkov (UKR)			15.100	4	15.233	7			15.200	13	15.266	9		
Vitaliy Nakonechnyi (UKR)	14.333	22	14.866	7							14.266	21		
Igor Radivilov (UKR)					15.433	4	16.066	7						
Oleg Stepko (UKR)	14.866	16	15.000	6	15.033	11	15.733	15	13.933	23				
Oleg Verniaiev (UKR)	14.866	16					16.266	3	15.600	2	14.466	20		
United States	45.266	3	40.633	7	45.257	4	46.632	6	45.765	3	46.399	3	269.952	5
Jake Dalton (USA)	15.466	5			15.033	11	16.066	7						
Jonathan Horton (USA)					15.266	7					15.200	10		
Danell Leyva (USA)	15.200	9	13.400	20					15.366	10	15.866	4		
Sam Mikulak (USA)	14.600	19	14.500	16			15.966	10	15.266	12				
John Orozco (USA)			12.733	23	14.958	13	14.600	20	15.133	15	15.333	8		
Russia	45.308	2	42.299	6	46.132	1	46.866	5	43.965	8	45.033	5	269.603	6
Denis Ablyazin (RUS)	15.475	4			15.616	3	16.400	2						
Aleksandr Balandin (RUS)					15.816	1			13.466	24				
David Belyavskiy (RUS)	14.933	13	12.933	22			16.133	6	15.433	7	14.833	16		
Emin Garibov (RUS)			14.833	8	14.700	16			15.066	17	15.600	7		
Igor Pakhomenko (RUS)	14.900	14	14.533	15			14.333	23			14.600	19		
Germany	45.199	4	40.466	8	44.824	6	47.032	4	45.433	4	45.065	4	268.019	7
Philipp Boy (GER)	14.800	18	13.200	21			15.566	18			13.766	23		
Fabian Hambüchen (GER)	15.066	12			14.858	14	15.633	17	15.400	9	16.166	2		
Sebastian Krimmer (GER)			14.733	11					14.533	22				
Marcel Nguyen (GER)	15.333	7			15.133	9	15.833	14	15.500	5	15.133	13		
Andreas Toba (GER)			12.533	24	14.833	15								
France	44.066	7	45.265	2	43.432	7	44.473	8	45.290	5	42.915	8	265.441	8
Pierre-Yves Bény (FRA)	14.333	22	15.033	5	14.466	21	14.566	21	14.591	21	13.266	24		
Yann Cucherat (FRA)														
Gaël da Silva (FRA)	15.200	9			14.633	17	15.466	19			14.766	17		
Hamilton Sabot (FRA)			14.766	9	14.333	23			15.566	4	14.833	15		
Cyril Tommasone (FRA)	14.533	20	15.466	2			14.441	22	15.133	15				

1. Uchimura was initially given a score of 13.466 on the pommel horse. However, the Japanese team filed an appeal, believing that he had been given the incorrect D-score for his dismount. After review by the Men's Technical Committee, the dismount's difficulty was authorized and his score was raised to 14.166.

== Controversy ==
Entering the last rotation of the final, China held the lead, followed by Japan, Ukraine, and Great Britain. Great Britain earned high scores on the floor exercise, allowing them to surpass Ukraine in the standings despite a solid rings programme from the Ukrainians. Meanwhile, however, Japan was encountering problems on its final apparatus, the pommel horse. First, Kazuhito Tanaka fell, earning a low score of 13.433. Then Kōhei Uchimura had a bad dismount and received a score of 13.466, knocking Japan down to fourth place, and moving Great Britain into second and Ukraine into third.

The Japanese team filed an appeal, arguing that Uchimura's difficulty score (D-score) had been incorrectly downgraded for his dismount, which—while executed poorly—was landed without a fall. After an in-depth video review by the Men's Technical Committee, headed by Adrian Stoica of Romania, Uchimura's dismount was given full difficulty credit (0.7 points for the G-level skill). This increased his total score to 14.166, giving Japan the silver medal and Great Britain the bronze, and knocking Ukraine to fourth place.
