= Emin Garibov =

Russian artistic gymnast

- Full name: Emin Nadirovich Garibov
- Born: September 8, 1990 (age 35) Moscow, Moscow Oblast, Russia
- Height: 170 cm (5 ft 7 in)

Gymnastics career
- Discipline: Men's artistic gymnastics
- Country represented: Russia
- College team: Moscow State Pedagogical University
- Club: Dinamo Moscow
- Head coach: Anatoly Zabelin
- Retired: 2017
Medal record
Representing Russia
European Championships
Gold medal – first place	2012 Montpellier	Horizontal Bar
Gold medal – first place	2013 Moscow	Horizontal Bar
Silver medal – second place	2012 Montpellier	Team
Summer Universiade
Gold medal – first place	2013 Kazan	Team
Gold medal – first place	2013 Kazan	Horizontal Bar
Gold medal – first place	2013 Kazan	Parallel Bars
Silver medal – second place	2009 Belgrade	Team

Emin Nadirovich Garibov (Russian: Эмин Надирович Гарибов; Azerbaijani: Emin Nadir oğlu Qəribov; born 8 September 1990 in Moscow) is a retired Russian artistic gymnast of Azerbaijani descent. He is the two-time (2013, 2012) European Horizontal Bar champion.

== Personal life ==
Garibov is the younger son of Azerbaijani parents Nadir Garibov and Natavan Garibova. He has an elder brother named Anar. Emin also plays football.

Garibov grew up near the Dinamo subway stop, and the school that he attended was surrounded by sporting complexes Dinamo, CSKA, SYuP, Krylya Sovetov.

== Career ==
Garibov started doing gymnastics at the age of four and a half. His first international victory came at the 2008 European Junior Championships in Switzerland where he won the gold medal on high bar and the silver medal on parallel bars.

Garibov was a member of the silver winning Russian team that competed at the 2009 Summer Universiade in Belgrade. He competed at the 2011 World Championships in Tokyo, Japan and finished 15th in all-around. He was part of the Russian silver medal-winning team that competed at the 2012 European Championships in Montpellier, France, where he also won the gold on high bar.

Garibov was captain of the Russian men's team at the 2012 Summer Olympics in London, where he finished 14th in the individual all-around. He also qualified for two event finals: parallel bars, where he placed 6th, and horizontal bar, where he placed 7th.

Garibov repeated as high bar champion at the 2013 European Championships in Moscow. With the Russian team (Nikolai Kuksenkov, David Belyavskiy, Denis Ablyazin and Nikita Ignatyev), he won Russia the team gold at the 2013 Summer Universiade, in Kazan, Russia. He won the Parallel Bars final ahead of teammate David Belyavskiy and at the Horizontal Bar he posted the highest score of 16.025 to win the gold medal.

In 2014, Garibov sustained an elbow injury and missed the remaining of the season. He spent the following year on his recovery and elbow rehabilitation.

In 2016, after 2 years of injury rehabilitation Garibov returned to international competition at the Osijek World Cup where he won a gold medal in Parallel bars. He announced his retirement on April 24, 2017. He is currently working as a sport journalist and sports TV commentator.

== See also ==
- List of Olympic male artistic gymnasts for Russia
