= Gaël Da Silva =

French gymnast (1984–2026)

- Born: 30 December 1984 Vaulx-en-Velin, France
- Died: 26 May 2026 (aged 41)
- Height: 1.67 m (5 ft 6 in)
- Spouse: Camille Schmutz

Gymnastics career
- Discipline: Men's artistic gymnastics
- Country represented: France
- Gym: SM Bourges
- Retired: 2013
Medal record
Men's artistic gymnastics
Representing France
European Championships
Bronze medal – third place	2012 Montpellier	Floor exercise
FIG World Cup
Event / 1st / 2nd / 3rd; World Cup / 0 / 1 / 3

Gaël Da Silva (30 December 1984 – 26 May 2026) was a French gymnast. He represented France at the 2012 Summer Olympics. He was the 2012 European bronze medalist on floor exercise.

Da Silva died on 26 May 2026, at the age of 41, due to a traffic collision.

== Gymnastics career ==
Da Silva was set to represent France at the 2008 Olympic Games; however, three days before leaving for Beijing, Da Silva ruptured his anterior cruciate ligament.

Da Silva won his first European Championships medal in 2012, a bronze on floor exercise. Da Silva competed at the 2012 Olympic Games; he helped France finish eighth in the team final. Individually, he finished tenth in the qualification round for men's floor exercise and was the second reserve for the final.

== Personal life ==
In 2004, Da Silva was involved in a motorcycle accident and needed to have multiple surgeries to fix his right leg. Da Silva was married to 2004 Olympian Camille Schmutz, with whom he shared three children.

On 26 May 2026, Da Silva died in a road accident.
