= Gymnastics at the 2014 Asian Games – Men's artistic team =

Men's team at the 2014 Asian Games
- Venue: Namdong Gymnasium
- Date: 21 September 2014
- Competitors: 65 from 12 nations

Medalists
gold medal	Japan; Tomomasa Hasegawa, Yuya Kamoto, Yusuke Saito, Shotaro Shirai, Kazuyuki Takeda, Masayoshi Yamamoto
silver medal	South Korea; Kim Hee-hoon, Lee Hyeok-jung, Lee Sang-wook, Park Min-soo, Shin Dong-hyen, Yang Hak-seon
bronze medal	China; Huang Xi, Huang Yuguo, Liao Junlin, Wang Peng, Yang Shengchao, Zou Kai

The men's artistic team competition at the 2014 Asian Games in Incheon, South Korea was held on 21 September 2014 at the Namdong Gymnasium.

== Schedule ==
All times are Korea Standard Time (UTC+09:00)

Date	Time	Event
Sunday, 21 September 2014	10:00	Final

== Results ==
Legend

- DNS — Did not start

Rank	Team	Floor (gymnastics)	Pommel horse	Rings (gymnastics)	Vault (gymnastics)	Parallel bars	Horizontal bar	Total
1st place, gold medalist(s)	Japan (JPN)	59.750	59.250	59.250	59.350	59.925	57.950	355.475
	Tomomasa Hasegawa		15.500		~~14.450~~	~~12.550~~	13.650	
	Yuya Kamoto	14.975	~~13.900~~	14.750	14.700	15.925	14.600	
	Yusuke Saito	14.425	14.450	14.650	14.700	14.850	14.850	
	Shotaro Shirai	15.450	14.500	14.700	15.050			
	Kazuyuki Takeda	14.900		15.150		14.700	~~13.150~~	
	Masayoshi Yamamoto	~~14.350~~	14.800	~~14.600~~	14.900	14.450	14.850	
2nd place, silver medalist(s)	South Korea (KOR)	58.325	58.325	57.975	59.600	60.150	56.500	350.875
	Kim Hee-hoon	14.100	14.550	14.375	~~14.200~~			
	Lee Hyeok-jung		~~13.650~~	~~14.075~~		14.950	14.225	
	Lee Sang-wook	14.425	13.925	14.100	14.450	15.050	13.875	
	Park Min-soo	~~13.600~~	14.650	14.550	14.650	15.100	15.050	
	Shin Dong-hyen	14.950	15.200		14.900	15.050	~~13.200~~	
	Yang Hak-seon	14.850		14.950	15.600	~~14.750~~	13.350	
3rd place, bronze medalist(s)	China (CHN)	59.750	56.150	58.875	58.500	59.400	57.625	350.300
	Huang Xi	14.750	13.700	14.425	14.850	14.850	14.050	
	Huang Yuguo	14.950	15.000	14.400	14.800	15.350	~~12.800~~	
	Liao Junlin		13.500	15.450		~~13.450~~		
	Wang Peng	14.700	~~12.900~~	~~14.350~~	14.350	14.150	13.625	
	Yang Shengchao	~~14.450~~	13.950	14.600	~~13.900~~	15.050	14.600	
	Zou Kai	15.350			14.500		15.350	
4	North Korea (PRK)	56.300	53.325	58.575	57.600	60.175	52.600	338.575
	Han Jong-hyok	13.550	~~12.550~~	14.450	13.450	15.050	13.600	
	Kim Jin-hyok		13.875	15.150		15.675	13.150	
	Kim Kwang-chun	13.400	13.150		14.250	15.000	13.800	
	Ra Won-chol	~~11.950~~	12.950	14.375	~~12.350~~	~~14.050~~	12.050	
	Ri Se-gwang	15.200	13.350	14.600	15.600			
	Ryang Kuk-chol	14.150		~~13.400~~	14.300	14.450	~~11.175~~	
5	Vietnam (VIE)	55.350	53.175	56.775	56.000	60.050	52.150	333.500
	Đặng Nam	13.100	13.275	15.200	13.850			
	Đinh Phương Thành	14.050	14.000	~~12.500~~	14.450	15.500	13.550	
	Đỗ Vũ Hưng	14.300	12.800		13.500	~~13.900~~	~~11.950~~	
	Hoàng Cường			13.475		14.200	12.600	
	Lê Thanh Tùng	13.900	13.100	13.750	14.200	14.850	12.900	
	Phạm Phước Hưng	~~0.000~~	~~12.250~~	14.350		15.500	13.100	
6	Chinese Taipei (TPE)	56.250	55.800	56.000	56.850	55.100	49.800	329.800
	Chen Chih-yu	14.200	~~11.150~~	15.400	14.300			
	Hsu Ping-chien	13.500	14.300	13.550	13.800	13.900	12.400	
	Huang Ta-yu	~~13.150~~	14.100	~~12.175~~	~~12.650~~	13.650	12.350	
	Lee Chih-kai	14.550	14.550	13.500	14.500	14.100	12.850	
	Lin Yi-chieh	14.000	12.850	13.550	14.250	13.450	12.200	
	Tang Chia-hung							
7	Uzbekistan (UZB)	51.675	53.825	54.600	57.000	56.400	50.075	323.575
	Rasuljon Abdurakhimov	11.850		~~12.650~~	14.300	13.750	12.450	
	Abdulla Azimov		14.825					
	Anton Fokin		12.250	14.450		15.550		
	Otabek Masharipov	13.225	13.550	13.500	14.000	13.500	12.400	
	Salokhiddin Mirzaev	12.150	~~10.925~~	13.900	14.300	~~12.250~~	12.325	
	Eduard Shaulov	14.450	13.200	12.750	14.400	13.600	12.900	
8	Iran (IRI)	55.050	54.400	55.100	56.250	52.250	46.450	319.500
	Mohammad Reza Hamidi	~~13.375~~	13.350	~~12.550~~	13.500	13.500	11.700	
	Saeid Reza Keikha	13.850	14.800	13.850	13.400	12.350	11.400	
	Iman Khamoushi	13.600	12.650	13.400	14.450	~~11.275~~	~~10.650~~	
	Hadi Khanarinejad	13.400		15.050		13.200	12.250	
	Mohammad Ramezanpour	14.200	13.600	12.800	14.900	13.200	11.100	
9	Kazakhstan (KAZ)	52.950	48.650	52.475	55.400	55.950	53.150	318.575
	Nurbol Babylov	12.900	10.550	12.650	14.300	~~11.750~~	12.700	
	Stepan Gorbachev	14.450	13.750	13.050	14.600	13.850	13.850	
	Ilya Kornev	11.750	11.250	13.750	13.650	14.000	13.850	
	Azizbek Kudratullayev			13.025		14.250	12.750	
	Maxim Petrishko	13.850	13.100		12.850	13.850		
10	India (IND)	53.425	50.425	53.150	55.200	53.900	49.550	315.650
	Dhan Bahadur		14.025			13.600		
	Ashish Kumar	14.450	12.300	13.200	14.350	13.400	12.550	
	Chandan Pathak	13.600	11.950	12.450	~~12.300~~		~~11.500~~	
	Rakesh Kumar Patra	~~12.400~~	~~11.500~~	14.350	13.950	14.150	12.550	
	Aditya Singh Rana	12.975	12.150	~~11.350~~	14.050	~~12.700~~	12.450	
	Abhijit Ishwar Shinde	12.400		13.150	12.850	12.750	12.000	
11	Singapore (SIN)	52.450	23.500	38.300	55.300	26.000	24.875	220.425
	Gabriel Gan	13.250	13.300	12.200	13.450	13.250	12.925	
	Hoe Wah Toon	14.000			14.050			
	Aizat Jufrie	11.600	10.200	12.800	14.000	12.750	11.950	
	Terry Tay	13.600		13.300	13.800			
—	Kuwait (KUW)							DNS
	Ali Al-Kandari	12.050		9.800	11.950			
	Ahmad Al-Qattan		12.825					
	Yousef Al-Sahhaf	11.950	10.550	10.750	12.600	10.850	10.600	
