= Alexander Shatilov =

Israeli artistic gymnast

- אלכסנדר "אלכס" שטילוב
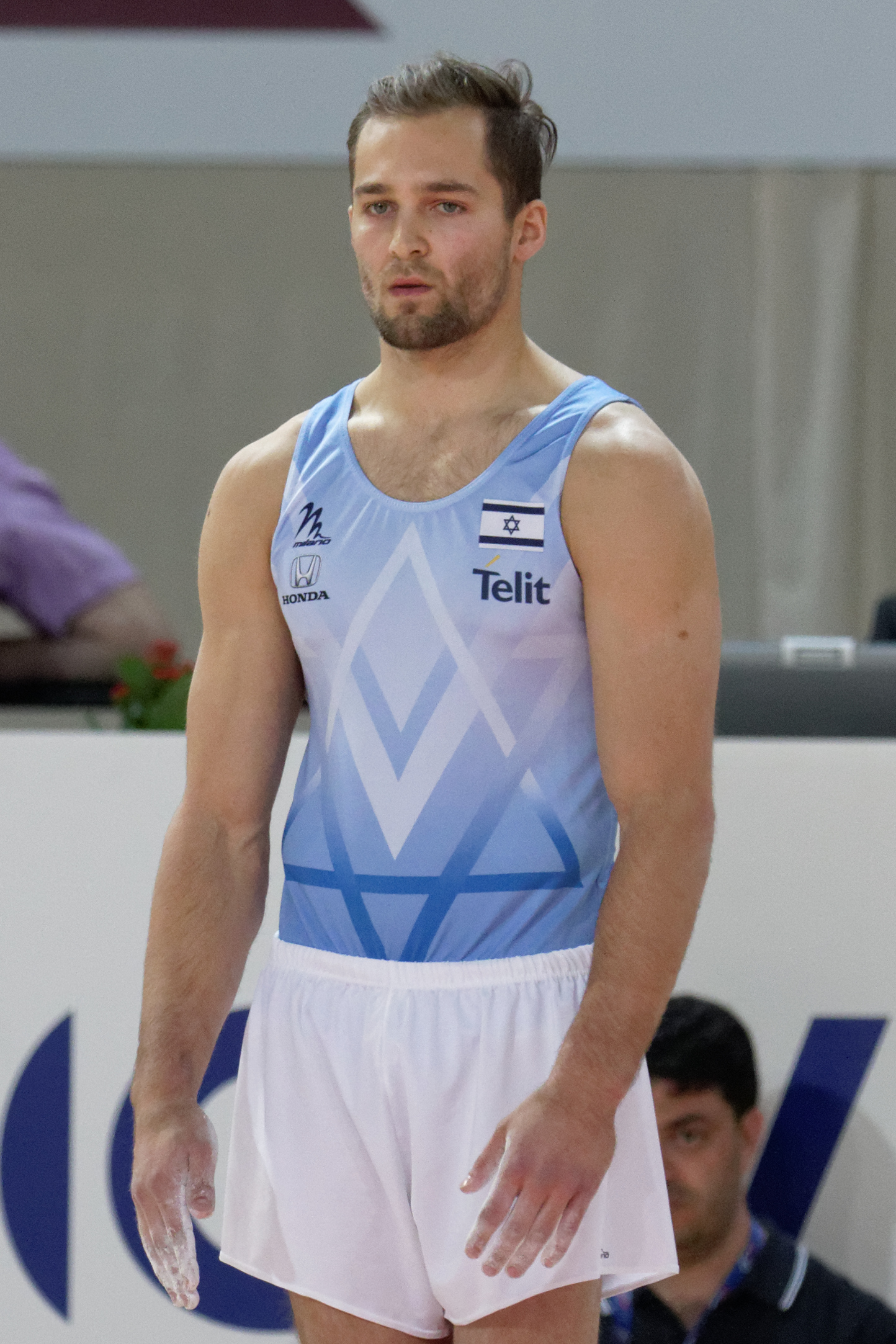
- Alexander Shatilov at the 2015 European Championships in Montpellier, France.

Personal information
- Full name: Alexander Shatilov
- Nicknames: Alex; Sasha
- Born: March 22, 1987 (age 39) Tashkent, Uzbek SSR, USSR
- Height: 183 cm (6 ft 0 in)

Gymnastics career
- Discipline: Men's artistic gymnastics
- Country represented: Israel
- Head coach: Sergei Vaisburg
Medal record
Representing Israel
World Championships
Bronze medal – third place	2009 London	Floor Exercise
Bronze medal – third place	2011 Tokyo	Floor Exercise
World Cup Final
Bronze medal – third place	2008 Madrid	Floor Exercise
European Championships
Gold medal – first place	2013 Moscow	Floor Exercise
Silver medal – second place	2011 Berlin	Floor Exercise
Bronze medal – third place	2009 Milan	Floor Exercise
Bronze medal – third place	2012 Montpelier	Floor Exercise
Bronze medal – third place	2014 Sofia	Floor Exercise
Bronze medal – third place	2016 Bern	Floor Exercise
Bronze medal – third place	2017 Cluj-Napoca	Floor Exercise

Alexander "Alex" Shatilov (Hebrew: אלכסנדר "אלכס" שטילוב, Russian: Александр Шатилов; born March 22, 1987) is a USSR-born Israeli artistic gymnast. He specializes in the floor exercise, in which he won several medals at World and European Championships, reached the finals at the 2008 and 2012 Summer Olympics, and competed in the 2016 Summer Olympics. In 2013, Shatilov won a gold medal at the European Championship in gymnastics in Moscow, Russia. He represented Israel at the 2020 Summer Olympics.

== Early life ==
Alexander Shatilov was born in Tashkent, Soviet Uzbekistan, in a family of Russian-Jewish descent. He began his gymnastics training in Uzbekistan at the age of 5. He immigrated to Israel with his family in 2002. He is unusually tall for a gymnast, at 183 cm or 6 ft.

== Athletic career ==
Shatilov placed seventh at the 2006 World Artistic Gymnastics Championships, and became the first Israeli gymnast in a world apparatus final. He placed fifth on floor exercise at the 2007 World Artistic Gymnastics Championships. He also won a gold medal in the Glasgow World Cup in 2008.

Shatilov represented Israel at the 2008 Summer Olympics. In the qualifying stage, he placed 8th on the floor apparatus and qualified for the final. He placed 29th overall, and just missed the cut for the all-around final. In the floor final he failed to improve his ranking and placed last of the eight finalists, which was still the best ever achievement in artistic gymnastics for an Israeli gymnast.

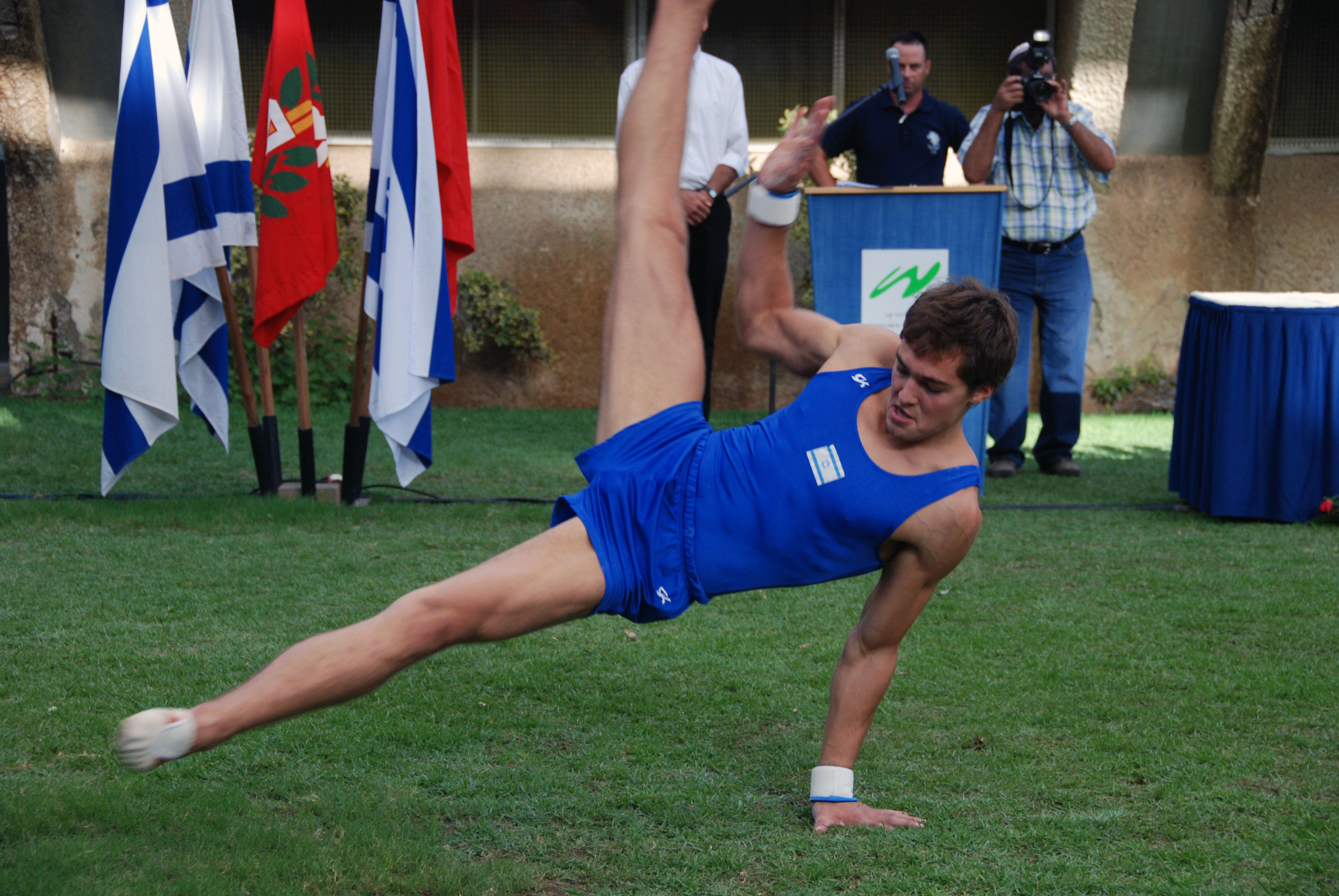
Shatilov at Wingate Institute

He won bronze medals in the floor exercise at the 2009 European Artistic Gymnastics Championships and the 2009 World Artistic Gymnastics Championships, and became the first Israeli to win a medal at both events.

He won four gold medals and two silver medals at the 2009 Maccabiah Games in gymnastics. He suffered a serious knee injury in the spring of 2010, and missed the European championships, but recovered in time to place fourth at the 2010 World Artistic Gymnastics Championships. Shatilov was awarded the title of Athlete of the Year in Israel in 2009 and 2013.

In 2011, he won the silver medal in the floor exercise at the European Artistic Gymnastics Championships. At the 2011 World Championships, he won the bronze medal in the floor exercise, and finished 13th in the all-around final.

His achievement qualified him to compete for Israel at the 2012 Summer Olympics. Shatilov tied for 4th on floor and placed 12th overall, qualifying for the finals in both events. In the men's floor final, Shatilov scored 15.333, and tied with American Jacob Dalton, but was placed beneath him because Dalton's execution points were higher. In the end, Shatilov placed 6th out of eight athletes.

In April 2013, Shatilov won a gold medal at the European Championship in Gymnastics in Moscow, Russia. He received a 15.333 score, and shared first place with British gymnast Max Whitlock. Shatilov is the first Israeli gymnast to win the European Championship.

In May 2016 he won the bronze medal in the floor exercise at the European Artistic Gymnastics Championships in Bern, Switzerland. In June 2016 he won a gold medal in the floor final at the World Challenge Cup competition in Anadia, Portugal, with a score of 15.100 after qualifying with a 15.350.

He competed for Israel at the 2016 Summer Olympics, in his third Olympic Games. He did not pass the qualifying round, after scoring a 14.066 in the men's horizontal bar and a 13.5 in his floor exercise.

In April 2017, Shatilov won the bronze medal in the floor exercise at the European Artistic Gymnastics Championships in Cluj-Napoca, Romania. He received a 14.400 score.

He was chosen to represent Israel at the 2020 Summer Olympics. However, with a 13.5, he did not qualify for the final of the 2020 Tokyo Olympic Games.

== Media Appearances ==
In 2022, Shatilov won the 8th season of Israel's Rokdim Im Kokhavim ('Dancing with the Stars'), dancing with Nina Soloviev.

== See also ==
- List of Jews in sports
- Sports in Israel
- Artem Dolgopyat
