= Aleksandr Balandin (gymnast) =

Russian artistic gymnast

- Full name: Aleksandr Sergeyevich Balandin
- Born: 20 June 1989 (age 37) Petrozavodsk, Russian SFSR, Soviet Union
- Height: 165 cm (5 ft 5 in)

Gymnastics career
- Discipline: Men's artistic gymnastics
- Country represented: Russia
- College team: Physical Education - Karelian State Pedagogical Academy
- Club: Dinamo Petrozavodsk
- Gym: Round Lake
- Head coach: Vitaly Bubnovsky
- Assistant coach: Sergey Zagorskikh
- Retired: 2017
Medal record
Representing Russia
World Championships
Silver medal – second place	2013 Antwerp	Rings
European Championships
Gold medal – first place	2012 Montpellier	Rings
Gold medal – first place	2014 Sofia	Team
Gold medal – first place	2014 Sofia	Rings
Silver medal – second place	2011 Berlin	Rings
Silver medal – second place	2012 Montpellier	Team
Summer Universiade
Gold medal – first place	2009 Belgrade	Rings
Silver medal – second place	2009 Belgrade	Team

Aleksandr Sergeyevich Balandin (Note: Russian: Александр Сергеевич Баландин) (born 20 June 1989) is a retired Russian artistic gymnast. He is known for his work on the rings and has three skills named after him on this apparatus. He was the 2012 and 2014 European champion on rings, and placed fourth when he represented Russia at the 2012 Summer Olympics in London.

== Career ==
He is known for his three skills – Balandin 1, Balandin 2 and Balandin 3. Balandin 1 is "From hang vertical pull up with straight arms to Maltese cross". Balandin 2 is "From hang vertical pull up with straight arms to inverted cross". Balandin 3 is "From hang vertical pull up with straight arms to planche". Balandin 1 is valued at F, Balandin 2 is valued at G while Balandin 3 is valued at E from the scale A to I in the Code of Points, which is used to show the difficulty of an element in gymnastics.

In August 2011 he broke his thigh bone during the Russian Cup, underwent surgery and was out of competition for six months.

=== 2012 Summer Olympics ===
Balandin competed at the 2012 Olympic Games in London as a member of the Russian MAG team. The team finished sixth with a score of 269.603 pts. Individually he placed fourth in the rings with a score of 15.666 pts.

=== 2013–present ===
Balandin competed at the 2013 World Championships in Antwerp. He qualified for the still rings final and won the silver medal – Russia's only MAG medal of the championships. At these championships he performed his eponymous skill which was officially named the Balandin 3.

In 19–25 May, at the 2014 European Championships in Sofia, Balandin contributed a score of 15.633 (rings) for Russia and along with teammates (Denis Ablyazin, David Belyavskiy, Nikita Ignatyev, Nikolai Kuksenkov) won Russia the team event gold medal with a total score of 267.959, ahead of Great Britain. In the event finals, Balandin tied for the gold medal with teammate Denis Ablyazin – both scored 15.800 points.

After suffering injuries for 3 years, Balandin announced his retirement in September 2017 due to his past shoulder injury, he began working as a coach. He has studied a master's programme in sports studies at Smolensk State Academy of Physical Education, Sport and Tourism.

== See also ==
- List of Olympic male artistic gymnasts for Russia
