= Kōhei Uchimura =

Japanese gymnast (born 1989)

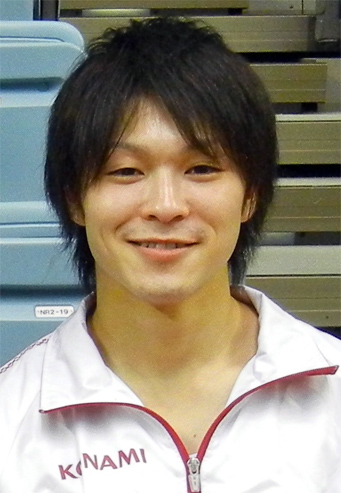
- Uchimura in 2011

Personal information
- Nicknames: King Kohei; Supermura; Superman
- Born: January 3, 1989 (age 37) Kitakyushu, Fukuoka
- Height: 162 cm (5 ft 4 in)

Gymnastics career
- Discipline: Men's artistic gymnastics
- Country represented: Japan; (2007–2022)
- College team: Nippon Sport Science University (Nittaidai)
- Club: Ringer Hut
- Head coach: Hiroyuki Kato
- Assistant coaches: Yoshiaki Hatakeda; Koji Gushiken
- Former coach: Naoya Tsukahara
- Retired: January 10, 2022
Medal record
Representing Japan
Men's artistic gymnastics
Event	1st	2nd	3rd
Olympic Games	3	4	0
World Championships	10	6	5
World Cup Final	0	1	1
Summer Universiade	2	0	1
Total	15	11	7
Olympic Games
Gold medal – first place	2012 London	All-Around
Gold medal – first place	2016 Rio de Janeiro	Team
Gold medal – first place	2016 Rio de Janeiro	All-Around
Silver medal – second place	2008 Beijing	Team
Silver medal – second place	2008 Beijing	All-Around
Silver medal – second place	2012 London	Team
Silver medal – second place	2012 London	Floor Exercise
World Championships
Gold medal – first place	2009 London	All-Around
Gold medal – first place	2010 Rotterdam	All-Around
Gold medal – first place	2011 Tokyo	All-Around
Gold medal – first place	2011 Tokyo	Floor Exercise
Gold medal – first place	2013 Antwerp	All-Around
Gold medal – first place	2013 Antwerp	Parallel Bars
Gold medal – first place	2014 Nanning	All-Around
Gold medal – first place	2015 Glasgow	Team
Gold medal – first place	2015 Glasgow	All-Around
Gold medal – first place	2015 Glasgow	Horizontal bar
Silver medal – second place	2010 Rotterdam	Team
Silver medal – second place	2010 Rotterdam	Floor Exercise
Silver medal – second place	2011 Tokyo	Team
Silver medal – second place	2014 Nanning	Team
Silver medal – second place	2014 Nanning	Horizontal Bar
Silver medal – second place	2018 Doha	Horizontal Bar
Bronze medal – third place	2010 Rotterdam	Parallel Bars
Bronze medal – third place	2011 Tokyo	Horizontal Bar
Bronze medal – third place	2013 Antwerp	Floor Exercise
Bronze medal – third place	2013 Antwerp	Horizontal Bar
Bronze medal – third place	2018 Doha	Team
World Cup Final
Silver medal – second place	2008 Madrid	Floor Exercise
Bronze medal – third place	2007 Paris	Vault
Summer Universiade
Gold medal – first place	2007 Bangkok	Team
Gold medal – first place	2007 Bangkok	Floor Exercise
Bronze medal – third place	2007 Bangkok	Vault

Kōhei Uchimura (内村 航平, Uchimura Kōhei; born January 3, 1989) is a Japanese retired artistic gymnast. He is a seven-time Olympic medalist (team, all-around and floor exercise), winning three golds and four silvers, and a 21-time World medalist (team, all-around, floor exercise, parallel bars and the horizontal bar).

Uchimura was already considered by many in the sport to be one of the greatest gymnasts of all time after he completely dominated to unprecedented levels in all the major competitions for the entire quad, and finally finishing the season by winning the Olympic individual all-around gold medal at the 2012 Summer Olympics in London. However, he then extended those accomplishments even further when he followed it up with continued and uninterrupted victories of every major competition again throughout the next Olympic cycle, replicating the feat he achieved in the last quad, which led him to win two additional gold medals on team and individual all-around at the 2016 Summer Olympics in Rio de Janeiro. Uchimura is known for being the first gymnast (male or female) to capture every major all-around title in an entire single Olympic cycle, accomplishing this feat twice by securing six world (2009–2011 and 2013–2015) and two Olympic (2012 London Olympics, and 2016 Rio Olympics) individual all-around titles. Uchimura also took the individual all-around silver medal at the 2008 Summer Olympics in Beijing. He is known for delivering difficult and accurately executed routines. The International Gymnast Magazine had praised his skills as a "combination of tremendous difficulty, supreme consistency and extraordinary elegance of performance."

== Early life and career ==
Uchimura was born in Kitakyushu, Fukuoka Prefecture, and began gymnastics at age 3 at his parents' sports club in Nagasaki Prefecture. His parents, Kazuhisa and Shuko Uchimura, were both competitive gymnasts. At age 15, he moved to Tokyo to train with Athens gold medalist Naoya Tsukahara. His younger sister Haruhi Uchimura is also a gymnast. Kōhei Uchimura stated of his beliefs, "I don’t believe in God. I never had lucky charms. All I believe in is practice." In his first international event, the 2005 International Junior Competition in Japan, he competed outside official competition.

== Senior career ==
=== 2007 ===
Uchimura joined the Japanese national squad in 2007, making his senior debut at the 2007 Paris World Cup in March, a major international competition. He took the bronze medal on vault, plus placed 9th on floor exercise here. In August at the 2007 Summer Universiade in Bangkok, he won the team title, and individual gold and bronze on respective floor exercise and vault. At Japan's National Championships in October, he got 7th on individual all-around. A month later at the international "Good Luck Beijing" event, he won team silver with Japan's team, and ranked 7th on floor exercise.

=== 2008 ===
Uchimura started the 2008 season by winning gold on floor at the World Cup in Tianjin in May.

Later that summer, he was selected to represent Japan at the 2008 Olympic Games in Beijing as a member of the national team. At the Olympics, he contributed to the team silver by competing on floor, vault, parallel bars, and high bar. He qualified for the all-around final, where he won the silver medal. His 2nd place win behind China's Yang Wei gave Japan its first Olympic medal in the event in 24 years. He obtained the highest mark of that meet on the floor 15.825 (double Arabian piked half out, triple twist dismount) and had a spectacular high bar routine (Kolman, piked Kovacs). He also qualified through to the floor final, where he placed fifth.

At the Japanese national championships that year, the 19-year-old Uchimura racked up the highest scores on floor exercise and pommel horse en route to winning his first national all around title. He was the first teenager in 12 years to win the Japanese men's national title.

=== 2009 ===
In October 2009, Uchimura competed at the 2009 World Championships. Here, he dominated both the qualifications and the all around final. He won the all around title by a margin of 2.575 points ahead of Daniel Keatings, marking top scores for floor, rings, vault, and horizontal bar. Uchimura placed fourth on floor and sixth on high bar as well.

He appeared on the cover of the December 2009 number of the International Gymnastics Magazine which was entitled "Uchimura rules".

=== 2010 ===
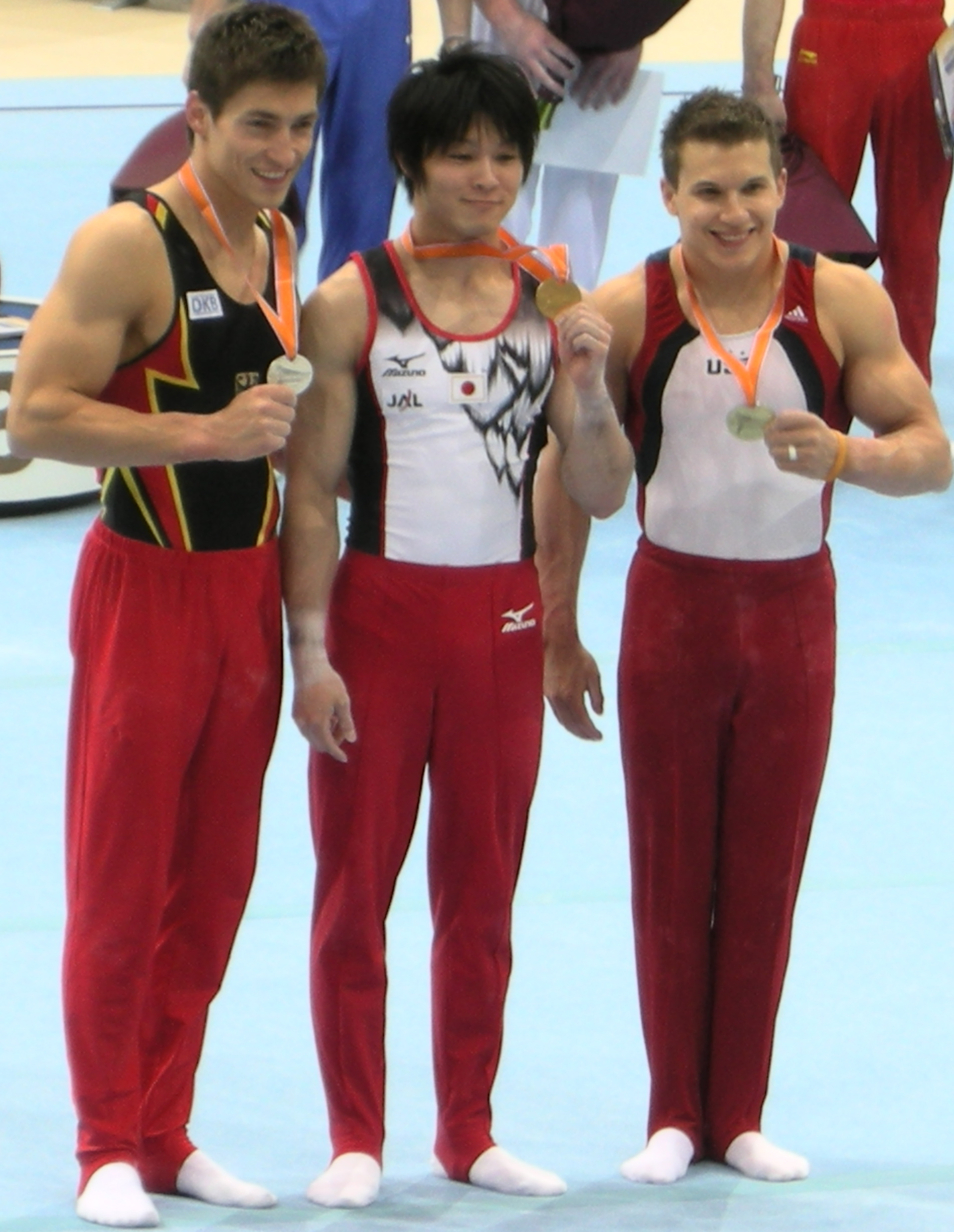
Philipp Boy (left), Uchimura (center) and Jonathan Horton (right) in 2010

In October 2010, Uchimura went to the 2010 World Championships again as a member of Japan's national team. As in 2009, he dominated the all-around prelims and finals, taking his second consecutive all-around title by a margin of 2.251 points ahead of Philipp Boy. In the all-around final, he had the top score of the day on floor, and highest execution mark (9.666) for a Yurchenko 2½ twists on vault. He contributed to Japan's team silver medal by competing in the team final on all events except still rings. He qualified for two event finals, winning silver on floor, and bronze on parallel bars.

=== 2011 ===
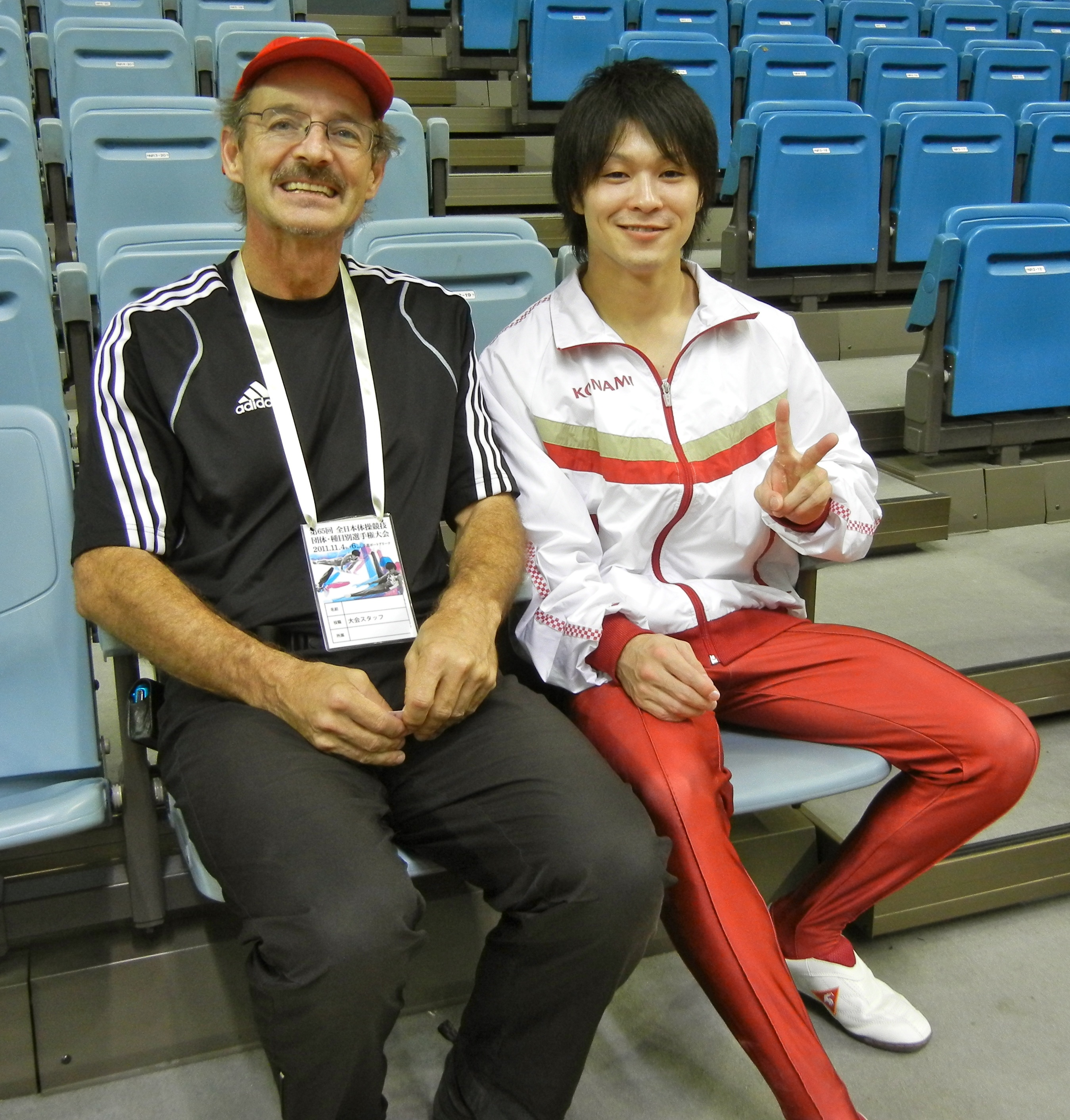
Kōhei Uchimura (on the right) and Rick McCharles at the All Japan Gymnastics Championships 2011

On October 14, 2011, Uchimura won the all-around final for the third time at the 2011 World Championships in Tokyo, Japan. With a score of 93.631 points, Uchimura won by a margin of 3.101 points, roughly the same margin that separated second and fourteenth place. Not only is he the first male gymnast to win three individual all-around titles, but Uchimura is also the first gymnast, male or female, to win three consecutive individual all-around titles.

In the all-around final, Uchimura recorded the highest score on four of the six events: floor exercise, still rings, parallel bars, and pommel horse (he tied for the highest score on pommel horse). Uchimura also qualified for five of the six individual apparatus finals, all except vault. He won his first World Championship gold medal on floor exercise, as well as a bronze medal on high bar and the silver medal with the Japanese team.

At the 2011 Worlds, Uchimura also won the Longines Prize for Elegance along with Romania's Ana Porgras. The prize is given at each World Championships to the male and female gymnasts who demonstrate "the most remarkable elegance". The winners were unanimously declared by a panel of judges, where both Uchimura and Porgras were each awarded a trophy, a Longines watch, and US$5,000. He was especially pleased to win this award since he collects watches.

In November 2011, Uchimura won four gold medals at the 65th Japanese Championships. Besides all-around, he also took titles on half the apparatuses: floor exercise, pommel horse, and high bar.

=== 2012 ===
Uchimura competed in the London 2012 Olympics in London and fell several times in qualifications, which put him in ninth place among the group of qualifiers for the individual all-around final. In the men's team gymnastics final, Uchimura fell from the pommel horse during his dismount. The Japanese coaches appealed the scoring on this performance as he still landed on his feet and felt it should have counted as a full dismount, albeit with a large penalty. Before the appeal, Great Britain were to get the silver and Ukraine the bronze, but the appeal pushed Japan's points total up to secure the silver behind China, which pushed Great Britain down to the bronze.

In the men's individual all-around final, Uchimura dominated the competition and won the gold medal with a score of 92.690. He also won the silver medal in the men's floor exercise event final with a score of 15.800, thanks to the tie-breaking procedure. It was automatically triggered due to his second highest combined score in the final tying the one by Denis Ablyazin of Russia, who did have the highest difficulty score of 7.1 among all finalists due to more passes. Unfortunately when there is a tie, the gymnast instead with the higher execution score will place ahead, which was Uchimura who posted the highest execution of 9.100 in the final.

=== 2013 ===
During qualifications Uchimura dominated, garnering an all-around total of 91.924, which was 2.392 points ahead of the closest competitor. He qualified for the floor exercise finals in third place with a 15.333, first for the parallel bars final with 15.400, and third for the high bar final with a 15.658. He qualified as a reserve for the pommel horse final with a 15.133.

Uchimura won a record fourth consecutive all-around gold medal at the 2013 World Artistic Gymnastics Championships in Antwerp. Uchimura finished with 91.990 points, almost two points ahead of the next nearest competitor. Uchimura also won bronze medals on floor exercise (15.500) behind Japan's 17-year-old newcomer Kenzō Shirai (16.000) and Jacob Dalton of the United States (15.600), and the horizontal bar (15.633) behind Epke Zonderland of the Netherlands (16.000) and Fabian Hambüchen of Germany (15.933), as well as a gold medal for parallel bars (15.666). His total of four individual medals is the highest number of medals Uchimura has earned at a single World Championships.

=== 2014 ===
On October 9, 2014, Uchimura once again made history, winning a record fifth consecutive world championship all-around gold at Nanning. He totaled 91.965 points, 1.492 points above Great Britain's Max Whitlock to capture the title.

Uchimura also secured the silver on the horizontal bar apparatus after he posted scores that sandwiched them between those by Epke Zonderland (Netherlands), who won the gold, and Marijo Možnik (Croatia), who took the bronze.

=== 2015 ===
On October 30, 2015, Uchimura won a record sixth all-around world gymnastics championship title, achieving a total score of 92.332, more than 1.6 points ahead of Cuban teenager Manrique Larduet and Deng Shudi of China.

Uchimura started off on the floor with a 15.733, and led Deng by 0.600 after the first rotation. Then on pommel horse, he scored a 15.100. He would continued with a 14.933 on rings, 15.633 on vault, and 15.833 on parallel bars before wrapping things up with a 15.100 on the horizontal bar, one of his best apparatuses, on which he had also taken a fall, just a few days before in the team competition.

Uchimura would then go on to win the horizontal bar apparatus final as well with a score of 15.833 ahead of Danell Leyva (United States) and Larduet.

However, what was even more significant was that Uchimura led Japan to victory in the team event final where they defeated Great Britain and China. This was their first team gold since the 1978 World Championships in Strasbourg.

=== 2016 ===
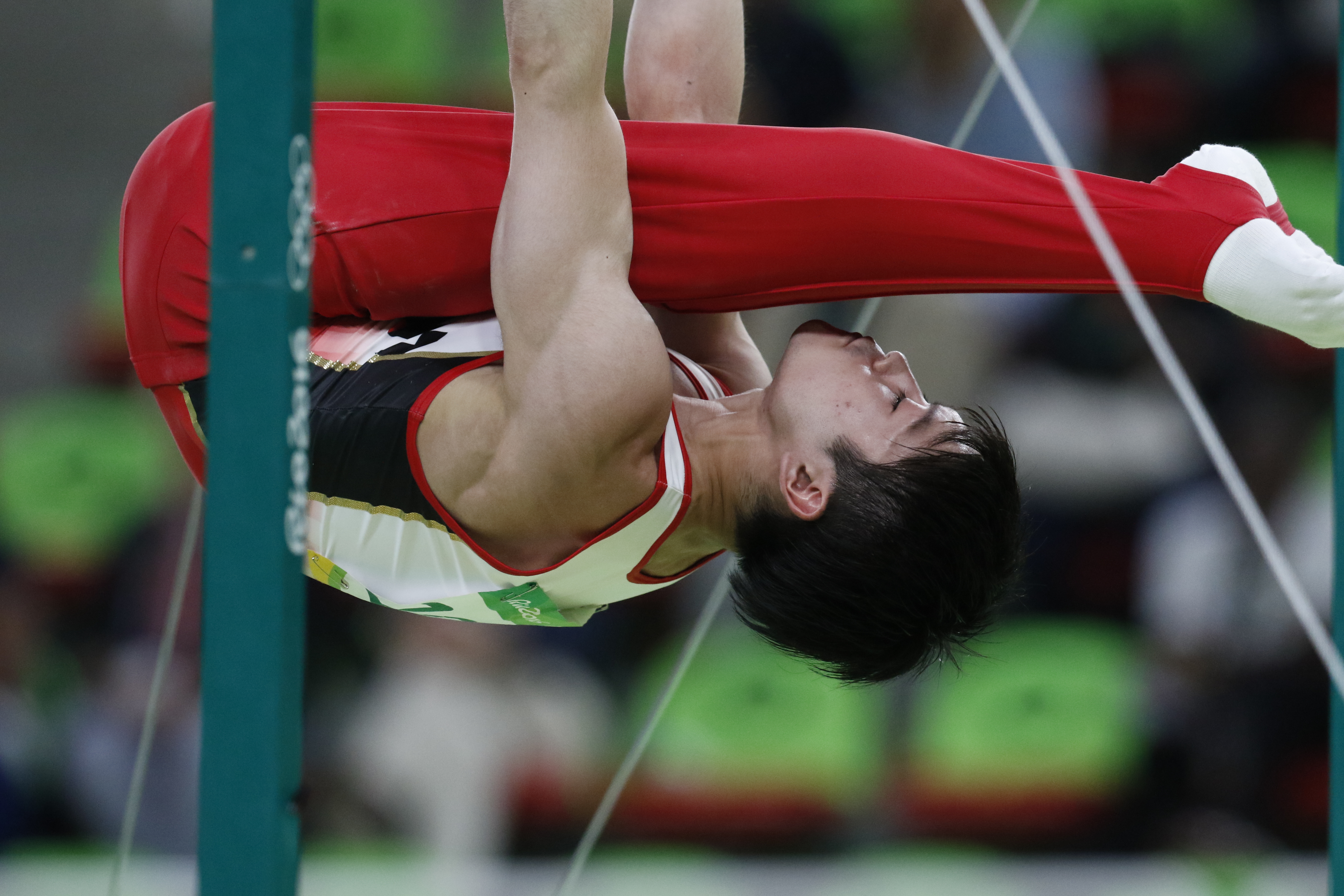
Uchimura at the 2016 Rio Olympics

Uchimura competed in the 2016 Summer Olympics in Rio de Janeiro. In the men's team all-around final, team captain Uchimura anchored the Japanese men to win the team gold medal with a total score of 274.094, reclaiming the title for Japan and the first time since the 2004 Summer Olympics in Athens.

Two days after the final of team event, Uchimura defended his individual all-around (AA) gold medal with a total score of 92.365, becoming the first gymnast in 44 years to win back-to-back individual all-around (IAA) golds at the Olympics. With his individual all-around silver medal from the 2008 Summer Olympics in Beijing, he also became only the second man in history after countryman Sawao Kato, who also won two golds and one silver in the individual all-around competition across the 1968 Mexico City, 1972 Munich and 1976 Montreal Olympics, to medal on the men's individual all-around event at three Olympic Games. His winning margin over silver medallist Oleg Verniaiev of Ukraine was extremely slim at only 0.099, less than a small step deduction on landing in terms of gymnastics scoring.

=== 2017 ===
At the 2017 World Artistic Gymnastics Championships in Montreal, his world all-around champion streak that began in 2009 came to an end when he injured his ankle on the vault landing in qualification, forcing him to withdraw.

This led to his long win-streak at worlds and Olympics being unexpectedly broken for the only time since he started winning the first of his six World Championships all-around title to begin the 2009 quad, and continue over the next two complete Olympic cycles (approximately 8 years), ending them by winning his second Olympic all-around title in 2016. This was also the first time in 9 years since before 2008 that he did not medal, namely silver and/or gold medals, at one of the FIG's major competitions—the Olympics or World Championships.

=== 2018–2019 ===
Between October 25 and November 3, 2018, Uchimura competed at the 2018 World Artistic Gymnastics Championships in Doha but on a reduced schedule. During the team event final, he had helped Team Japan secure the bronze medal behind team event champion China and runner-up Russia by contributing scores to four apparatuses—pommel horse (14.133), rings (14.200), parallel bars (14.500) and high bar (14.400). Uchimura also qualified for the individual event final on the horizontal bar, winning the silver with a score of 14.800 behind the 2012 Olympic high bar champion, Epke Zonderland of the Netherlands, who scored a 15.100.

Uchimura did not compete in any significant competitions during the 2019 season due to injuries.

=== 2020–2021 ===
At the age of 32, Uchimura qualified for the 2020 Summer Olympics in Tokyo, Japan, his fourth and home Olympic Games, as an apparatus specialist on the horizontal bar after a tiebreak in the selection process worked in his favour. He has expressed earlier that he could still contribute positively to the Japanese team but perhaps not with the kind of gruelling physical requirements that are necessary for an all-arounder anymore.

At the Olympics, Uchimura did not qualify for the high bar finals after placing 20th due to mistake in the qualifying round, and decided to skip the parallel bars event. The eventual gold medalist in the individual all-around and horizontal bar finals was countryman Daiki Hashimoto (most successful gymnast at these Games and also considered to be Uchimura's heir apparent), who at 19 years, 11 months and 21 days old became Japan's second youngest teen gold medal gymnast (lost by only six days to Kenzō Shirai at the 2016 Summer Games), as well as their youngest ever individual gold medal gymnast in Olympic history on the individual all-around (AA) and high bar events.

On October 18–24, 2021, competing at home in Kitakyushu, Japan, Uchimura, at 32 years, 9 months and 21 days old, was selected as part of the Japanese world championship team in artistic gymnastics (AG) as an apparatus specialist to compete only on the individual horizontal bar event. He qualified in fifth place with a score of 14.300 for the event final where he finished in sixth place with a score of 14.600. This was long intended to be his final competition, concluding an illustrious career, which many would consider him the best of all time. His apparent successor, the men's 2020 Olympics individual all-around and horizontal bar champion, Hashimoto, was the top individual horizontal bar qualifier with a score of 14.633. For the same two individual events, he earned himself two silver medals in the individual all-around and horizontal bar finals instead with scores of 87.964 and 14.600. Hu Xuwei and Zhang Boheng, both of China, respectively won the men's individual all-around and horizontal bar events with scores of 87.981 and 15.166. Lastly, Hashimoto placed fourth in the men's individual parallel bars finals with a score of 15.000, but also withdrew from the men's individual pommel horse and floor exercise finals, for which he qualified to.

== Retirement ==
On January 10, 2022, Uchimura officially announced his retirement from competitive gymnastics, having been plagued by various persistent injuries since his rare withdrawal from the 2017 World Championships following an ankle injury sustained during the qualification round of the men's individual all-around competition. Although Uchimura retired with no eponymous skills, he always maintained that this was never a primary aim of his long career. Uchimura is considered by many to have retired as the greatest male gymnast of all time.

== Competitive history ==
Competitive history of Kōhei Uchimura
Year	Event	Team	AA	FX	PH	SR	VT	PB	HB
2007	Paris World Cup			9			3rd place, bronze medalist(s)		
2007	Summer Universiade	1st place, gold medalist(s)		1st place, gold medalist(s)			3rd place, bronze medalist(s)		
2008	All-Japan Championships		1st place, gold medalist(s)						
2008	Olympic Games	2nd place, silver medalist(s)	2nd place, silver medalist(s)						
2008	World Cup Final	—N/a		2nd place, silver medalist(s)					
2009	Cottbus World Cup			1st place, gold medalist(s)					
2009	All-Japan Championships		1st place, gold medalist(s)						
2009	World Championships	—N/a	1st place, gold medalist(s)	4					6
2010	Paris World Challenge Cup					2nd place, silver medalist(s)			1st place, gold medalist(s)
2010	All-Japan Championships		1st place, gold medalist(s)						
2010	World Championships	2nd place, silver medalist(s)	1st place, gold medalist(s)	2nd place, silver medalist(s)		8		3rd place, bronze medalist(s)	
2011	Tokyo World Cup		1st place, gold medalist(s)						
2011	All-Japan Championships		1st place, gold medalist(s)						
2011	World Championships	2nd place, silver medalist(s)	1st place, gold medalist(s)	1st place, gold medalist(s)	5	6		4	3rd place, bronze medalist(s)
2012	All-Japan Championships		1st place, gold medalist(s)						
2012	Olympic Games	2nd place, silver medalist(s)	1st place, gold medalist(s)	2nd place, silver medalist(s)				5	
2013	All-Japan Championships		1st place, gold medalist(s)						
2013	World Championships	—N/a	1st place, gold medalist(s)	3rd place, bronze medalist(s)				1st place, gold medalist(s)	3rd place, bronze medalist(s)
2014	Tokyo World Cup		1st place, gold medalist(s)						
2014	All-Japan Championships		1st place, gold medalist(s)						
2014	World Championships	2nd place, silver medalist(s)	1st place, gold medalist(s)	5					2nd place, silver medalist(s)
2015	All-Japan Championships		1st place, gold medalist(s)						
2015	World Championships	1st place, gold medalist(s)	1st place, gold medalist(s)		R1			R2	1st place, gold medalist(s)
2016	All-Japan Championships		1st place, gold medalist(s)						
2016	Olympic Games	1st place, gold medalist(s)	1st place, gold medalist(s)	5				R1	
2017	All-Japan Championships		1st place, gold medalist(s)						
2017	World Championships	—N/a				32		30	
2018	All-Japan Championships		3rd place, bronze medalist(s)						1st place, gold medalist(s)
2018	NHK Trophy		1st place, gold medalist(s)	2nd place, silver medalist(s)					1st place, gold medalist(s)
2018	World Championships	3rd place, bronze medalist(s)							2nd place, silver medalist(s)
2020	All-Japan Championships								1st place, gold medalist(s)
2020	Friendship and Solidarity Meet	1st place, gold medalist(s)							
2021	All-Japan Championships								1st place, gold medalist(s)
2021	All-Japan Event Championships								2nd place, silver medalist(s)
2021	Olympic Games								20
2021	World Championships	—N/a							6

== Personal life ==
Uchimura married his wife Chiho in the autumn of 2012. They have two daughters, born in 2013 and 2015. Asked if he would teach them gymnastics he replied, "If they were boys I think I probably would... but I don't understand women's gymnastics and I think it's much more severe." He eats just one meal a day and rather dislikes vegetables.

== See also ==
- List of multiple Olympic gold medalists at a single Games
- List of multiple Olympic medalists
- List of Olympic medal leaders in men's gymnastics
