= Zou Kai =

Chinese artistic gymnast

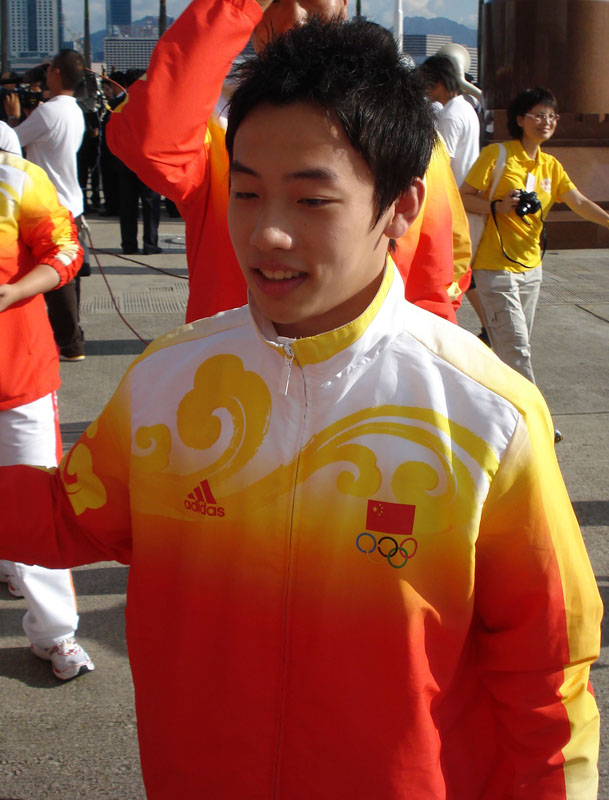
- Zou Kai at the 2008 Summer Olympics in Beijing

Personal information
- Full name: Zou Kai
- Born: February 25, 1988 (age 38) Luzhou, Sichuan, China
- Height: 158 cm (5 ft 2 in)

Gymnastics career
- Discipline: Men's artistic gymnastics
- Country represented: China
- Club: China National School
- Head coach: Huang Yubin
- Assistant coach: Bai Yuanshao
- Former coaches: Lin Zhaoyang; Lei Ming
Medal record
Artistic gymnastics
Representing China
Event	1st	2nd	3rd
Summer Olympics	5	0	1
World Championships	5	2	0
Asian Games	4	1	1
Total	14	3	2
Olympic Games
Gold medal – first place	2008 Beijing	Team
Gold medal – first place	2008 Beijing	Floor Exercise
Gold medal – first place	2008 Beijing	Horizontal Bar
Gold medal – first place	2012 London	Team
Gold medal – first place	2012 London	Floor Exercise
Bronze medal – third place	2012 London	Horizontal Bar
World Championships
Gold medal – first place	2006 Aarhus	Team
Gold medal – first place	2007 Stuttgart	Team
Gold medal – first place	2009 London	Horizontal Bar
Gold medal – first place	2011 Tokyo	Team
Gold medal – first place	2011 Tokyo	Horizontal Bar
Silver medal – second place	2009 London	Floor Exercise
Silver medal – second place	2011 Tokyo	Floor Exercise
Asian Games
Gold medal – first place	2006 Doha	Team
Gold medal – first place	2006 Doha	Floor Exercise
Gold medal – first place	2014 Incheon	Floor Exercise
Gold medal – first place	2014 Incheon	Horizontal Bar
Silver medal – second place	2006 Doha	Horizontal Bar
Bronze medal – third place	2014 Incheon	Team

Zou Kai (Chinese: 邹凯; pinyin: Zōu Kǎi; born February 25, 1988, in Luzhou, Sichuan) is a five-time Olympic and five-time World champion Chinese gymnast, specializing in floor exercise and the horizontal bar.

Zou won his first three Olympic gold medals at the 2008 Olympic Games in Beijing, resulting in a nomination for the Laureus World Sports Award for Breakthrough of the Year in 2009. He later won two additional gold medals at the 2012 Olympic Games in London.

As of 2024, Zou's total of five gold medals and one bronze ties him for the record of second most Olympic gold medals won by any Chinese athlete in Olympic history, behind Ma Long, and ties him for the record of third most medals won overall by a Chinese athlete, behind Zhang Yufei (ten medals), Wu Minxia, and Huang Xuechen (seven medals each).

== Gymnastics career ==
=== World Championships debut ===
Zou made his debut at the 2006 World Artistic Gymnastics Championships in Aarhus, helping the Chinese Team win gold, and placing sixth at the individual floor exercise final.

At the 2007 World Artistic Gymnastics Championships in Stuttgart, Zou achieved the same results, winning the team competition and again placing sixth on floor.

=== 2006 Asian Games ===
Zou participated in the 2006 Asian Games in Doha, winning gold in the floor exercise and silver in the horizontal bar individual events, as well as a gold medal as part of the Chinese team.

=== 2008 Summer Olympics ===
On his Olympic debut at the 2008 Summer Olympics in Beijing, Zou contributed to the team's gold and also won unexpected individual gold medals on floor exercise and the horizontal bar scoring 16.050 and 16.200 respectively.

Zou was the second Chinese Olympian to receive three gold medals at a single Olympic Games, following Li Ning who first achieved the feat at the 1984 Summer Olympics, and was the most successful Chinese athlete at the Beijing Olympics, with the most gold medal wins.

=== 2009 World Championships ===
During the 2009 World Artistic Gymnastics Championships in London, Zou won a gold medal in the individual horizontal bar event and also won a silver medal in the floor exercise individual event.

=== 2011 World Championships ===
After being left out of the Chinese Gymnastic Team at both the 2010 World Championships in Rotterdam and 2010 Asian Games in Guangzhou due to weaknesses in the apparatuses he did not specialize in, Zou again won two gold and one silver medals at the 2011 World Artistic Gymnastics Championships in Tokyo, matching his feat back in 2009.

=== 2012 Summer Olympics ===
At the 2012 Summer Olympics in London, Zou led the team to win gold and later successfully defended his Olympic title at the floor exercise, winning gold again, only the second to do so in the men's floor exercise following Soviet Gymnast Nikolai Andrianov who won the event in 1972 and 1976. He was unable to defend his title in the horizontal bar, however, finishing less than two tenths of a point behind the lead, eventually winning a bronze medal in the event. The last gymnast to successfully defend his Olympic title on the horizontal bar was Mitsuo Tsukahara, who won the event in 1972 and 1976, at the same Olympics as Andrianov.

With a total of five Olympic gold medals, Zou holds the record for most golds won by any Chinese athlete in Olympic history, and by adding a bronze medal to the tally, he tied the record for most medals overall, with six.

=== 2014 Asian Games ===
Zou participated in the 2014 Asian Games in Incheon, winning gold in both the floor exercise and horizontal bar individual events, as well as a bronze medal as part of the Chinese team.

== Personal life ==
Zou, a Sichuan native, auctioned off one of his Olympic gold medals in 2008, donating all proceeds to fund relief efforts in the aftermath of the 2008 Sichuan earthquake. Out of the three gold medals he'd earned at the 2008 Summer Olympics in Beijing, he chose the medal won for his floor exercise routine for its special significance since only two other Chinese gymnasts had ever won it, Li Ning and Li Xiaoshuang.

== See also ==
- China at the 2008 Summer Olympics
- China at the 2012 Summer Olympics
- List of Olympic medalists in gymnastics (men)
- List of multiple Olympic gold medalists
- List of multiple Olympic gold medalists at a single Games
