= 2012 European Men's Artistic Gymnastics Championships =

30th European Men's Artistic Gymnastics Championships
- Location: Montpellier, France
- Dates: 23 to 27 May 2012
- Nations: Members of the European Union of Gymnastics

The 30th European Men's Artistic Gymnastics Championships was held from 23 to 27 May 2012 at Montpellier. The senior and junior events are different. During the senior's qualification the top eight teams progress to the team final, and the top eight gymnasts (two per nation maximum) on each apparatus qualify for the individual finals. After the qualification for the juniors the team medals and places are awarded. Unlike the seniors in this event the top 24 gymnasts (two per nation maximum) compete in the all around final.

Oldest and youngest competitors

Senior	Name	Country	Date of birth	Age
Youngest	Oleg Stepko	Ukraine	25/03/94	18 years
Oldest	Mitja Petkovšek	Slovenia	06/02/77	35 years

Junior	Name	Country	Date of birth	Age
Youngest	Shane Lindon	(Republic of Ireland) Ireland	04/08/98	13 years
Oldest	Daniel Weinert	Germany	01/01/94	18 years

== Medal winners ==
Event	Gold	Silver	Bronze
Seniors
Team	Great Britain	Russia	Romania
Floor	Eleftherios Kosmidis (GRE)	Dzmitry Barkalau (BLR)	Gaël Da Silva (FRA); Alexander Shatilov (ISR)
Pommel horse	Krisztián Berki (HUN)	Louis Smith (GBR)	Harutyun Merdinyan (ARM)
Rings	Aleksandr Balandin (RUS)	Matteo Morandi (ITA)	Denis Ablyazin (RUS)
Vault	Flavius Koczi (ROM)	Igor Radivilov (UKR)	Denis Ablyazin (RUS)
Parallel bars	Marcel Nguyen (GER)	Oleg Verniaiev (UKR)	Mitja Petkovšek (SLO)
Horizontal bar	Emin Garibov (RUS)	Marijo Možnik (CRO)	Vlasios Maras (GRE)
Juniors
Team	Great Britain	Russia	Switzerland
All round	Frank Baines (GBR)	Nile Wilson (GBR)	Eddy Yusof (SUI)
Floor	Kirill Prokopev (RUS)	Daniel Radeanu (ROM)	Daan Kenis (BEL); Andrej Korosteljev (CRO)
Pommel horse	Gaius Thompson (GBR)	Bram Louwije (BEL)	Eddy Yusof (SUI)
Rings	Courtney Tulloch (GBR)	Stephen Micholet (FRA)	Eddy Yusof (SUI)
Vault	Casimir Schmidt (NED)	Daniel Radeanu (ROM)	Marco Walter (SUI)
Parallel bars	Grigorii Zyrianov (RUS)	Daniel Weinert (GER); İbrahim Çolak (TUR)	
Horizontal bar	Frank Baines (GBR)	Eddy Yusof (SUI)	Grigorii Zyrianov (RUS)

== Detail results ==
=== Seniors ===
==== Team ====
Oldest and youngest competitors

	Name	Country	Date of birth	Age
Youngest	Oleg Stepko	Ukraine	25/03/94	18 years
Oldest	Dzmitry Kaspiarovich	Belarus	15/10/77	34 years

Rank	Team	Floor (gymnastics)	Pommel horse	Rings (gymnastics)	Vault (gymnastics)	Parallel bars	Horizontal bar	Total
1st place, gold medalist(s)	Great Britain	44.624	45.433	43.299	47.100	43.999	41.841	266.296
1st place, gold medalist(s)	Kristian Thomas	15.358	-	14.266	15.300	-	15.133	266.296
1st place, gold medalist(s)	Louis Smith	-	15.833	-	-	-	-	266.296
1st place, gold medalist(s)	Daniel Purvis	13.966	14.300	14.633	15.700	14.900	14.175	266.296
1st place, gold medalist(s)	Ruslan Panteleymonov	-	-	14.400	16.100	14.666	-	266.296
1st place, gold medalist(s)	Max Whitlock	15.300	15.300	-	-	14.433	12.533	266.296
2nd place, silver medalist(s)	Russia	44.732	42.366	44.874	47.032	43.799	42.732	265.535
2nd place, silver medalist(s)	Denis Ablyazin	15.266	-	15.241	16.066	-	-	265.535
2nd place, silver medalist(s)	Emin Garibov	-	14.733	14.233	-	14.600	15.766	265.535
2nd place, silver medalist(s)	David Belyavskiy	15.200	14.500	-	14.866	14.366	14.500	265.535
2nd place, silver medalist(s)	Anton Golotsutskov	14.266	13.133	-	16.100	-	12.466	265.535
2nd place, silver medalist(s)	Aleksandr Balandin	-	-	15.400	-	14.833	-	265.535
3rd place, bronze medalist(s)	Romania	44.232	42.399	42.333	46.724	43.699	41.932	261.319
3rd place, bronze medalist(s)	Flavius Koczi	15.033	14.633	13.900	16.133	-	-	261.319
3rd place, bronze medalist(s)	Marius Berbecar			14.100	15.191	15.100	-	261.319
3rd place, bronze medalist(s)	Ovidiu Buidoso	-	14.266	-	-	14.166	13.666	261.319
3rd place, bronze medalist(s)	Vlad Bogdan Cotuna	14.966	-	-	-	14.433	14.633	261.319
3rd place, bronze medalist(s)	Cristian Ioan Bataga	14.233	13.500	14.333	15.400	-	13.633	261.319
4	Belarus	42.699	41.741	41.898	46.332	44.499	43.941	261.110
4	Dzmitry Kaspiarovich	-	-	-	16.066	14.766	-	261.110
4	Andrey Likhovitskiy	14.366	14.650	13.966	-	14.733	14.600	261.110
4	Aliaksandr Tsarevich	-	14.133	-	-	15.000	14.933	261.110
4	Dzmitry Barkalau	14.800	12.958	13.966	15.433	-	14.408	261.110
4	Pavel Bulauski	13.533	-	13.966	14.833	-	-	261.110
5	Ukraine	42.649	42.799	41.033	47.300	44.899	41.566	260.246
5	Petro Pakhnyuk	-	13.566	-	-	-	-	260.246
5	Oleg Verniaiev	13.933	14.400	11.800	15.800	15.133	13.633	260.246
5	Oleg Stepko	14.650	14.833	14.233	15.400	15.333	13.333	260.246
5	Maksym Semiankiv	-	-	-	-	14.433	14.600	260.246
5	Igor Radivilov	14.066	-	15.000	16.100	-	-	260.246
6	Germany	43.832	41.399	41.432	45.899	44.941	41.766	259.269
6	Philipp Boy	14.333	14.100	13.066	15.000	-	15.600	259.269
6	Sebastian Krimmer	-	13.333	-	-	15.033	14.866	259.269
6	Marcel Nguyen	14.933	-	14.666	15.866	15.275	-	259.269
6	Matthias Fahrig	14.566	-	-	15.033	14.633	-	259.269
6	Eugen Spiridonov	-	13.966	13.700	-	-	11.300	259.269
7	Switzerland	41.099	39.791	41.850	44.766	44.166	42.099	253.771
7	Claudio Capelli	14.100	-	13.600	14.600	14.733	-	253.771
7	Nils Haller	-	-	14.400	-	14.633	13.233	253.771
7	Pascal Bucher	13.766	12.533	-	15.400	14.800	-	253.771
7	Pablo Brägger	13.233	13.025	13.850	-	-	14.433	253.771
7	Oliver Hegi	-	14.233	-	14.766	-	14.433	253.771
8	France	27.932	40.932	28.333	31.199	44.866	29.766	203.028
8	Samir Aït Saïd	-	-	-	0.000	-	-	203.028
8	Gaël Da Silva	14.466	12.266	14.000	15.783	14.200	14.300	203.028
8	Hamilton Sabot	-	13.333	14.333	-	15.566	15.466	203.028
8	Cyril Tommasone	13.466	15.333	-	15.416	15.100	0.000	203.028

==== Floor ====
Oldest and youngest competitors

Senior	Name	Country	Date of birth	Age
Youngest	Denis Ablyazin	Russia	03/08/92	19 years
Oldest	Gaël Da Silva	France	30/12/84	27 years

Rank	Gymnast	D Score	E Score	Pen.	Total
1st place, gold medalist(s)	Eleftherios Kosmidis (GRE)	6.600	9.166		15.766
2nd place, silver medalist(s)	Dzmitry Barkalau (BLR)	6.400	8.900		15.300
3rd place, bronze medalist(s)	Gaël Da Silva (FRA)	6.300	8.966	0.1	15.166
3rd place, bronze medalist(s)	Alexander Shatilov (ISR)	6.700	8.566	0.1	15.166
5	Kristian Thomas (GBR)	6.300	8.666		14.966
6	Denis Ablyazin (RUS)	7.100	7.700		14.800
7	Kieran Behan (IRL)	6.000	8.533	0.1	14.433
8	Anton Golotsutskov (RUS)	5.800	7.500	0.3	13.000

==== Pommel horse ====
Oldest and youngest competitors

	Name	Country	Date of birth	Age
Youngest	Max Whitlock	United Kingdom	13/01/93	19 years
Oldest	Harutyun Merdinyan	Armenia	16/08/84	27 years

Rank	Gymnast	D Score	E Score	Pen.	Total
1st place, gold medalist(s)	Krisztián Berki (HUN)	6.900	9.058		15.958
2nd place, silver medalist(s)	Louis Smith (GBR)	6.900	8.875		15.775
3rd place, bronze medalist(s)	Harutyun Merdinyan (ARM)	6.400	8.900		15.300
4	Robert Seligman (CRO)	6.400	8.866		15.266
5	Vid Hidvégi (HUN)	6.500	8.633		15.133
6	Max Whitlock (GBR)	6.700	8.283		14.983
7	Cyril Tommasone (FRA)	6.400	8.433		14.833
8	Donna Donny Truyens (BEL)	6.500	8.133		14.633

==== Rings ====
Oldest and youngest competitors

	Name	Country	Date of birth	Age
Youngest	Denis Ablyazin	Russia	03/08/92	19 years
Oldest	Matteo Morandi	Italy	08/10/81	30 years

Rank	Gymnast	D Score	E Score	Pen.	Total
1st place, gold medalist(s)	Aleksandr Balandin (RUS)	6.700	8.966		15.666
2nd place, silver medalist(s)	Matteo Morandi (ITA)	6.800	8.666		15.466
3rd place, bronze medalist(s)	Denis Ablyazin (RUS)	6.600	8.833		15.433
4	Yuri van Gelder (NED)	6.800	8.608		15.408
5	Eleftherios Petrounias (GRE)	6.800	8.533		15.333
6	Marcel Nguyen (GER)	6.600	8.400		15.000
7	Nils Haller (SUI)	6.300	8.300		14.600
8	Vahagn Davtyan (ARM)	6.500	7.900		14.400

==== Vault ====
Oldest and youngest competitors

	Name	Country	Date of birth	Age
Youngest	Igor Radivilov	Ukraine	19/10/92	19 years
Oldest	Dzmitry Kaspiarovich	Belarus	15/10/77	34 years

Rank	Gymnast	D Score	E Score	Pen.	Score 1	D Score	E Score	Pen.	Score 2	Total
1st place, gold medalist(s)	Flavius Koczi (ROM)	7.000	9.200	0.1	16.100	7.000	9.133		16.133	16.116
2nd place, silver medalist(s)	Igor Radivilov (UKR)	7.000	9.233		16.233	7.000	8.900		15.900	16.066
3rd place, bronze medalist(s)	Denis Ablyazin (RUS)	7.000	8.966		15.966	7.200	8.958		16.158	16.062
4	Dzmitry Kaspiarovich (BLR)	7.000	9.083		16.083	7.000	8.833		15.833	15.958
5	Matthias Fahrig (GER)	7.000	9.066		16.066	6.600	9.033		15.633	15.849
6	Ruslan Panteleymonov (GBR)	7.000	9.133		16.133	6.600	9.000	0.1	15.500	15.816
7	Anton Golotsutskov (RUS)	7.000	9.066		16.066	7.000	8.000		15.000	15.533
8	Kristian Thomas (GBR)	7.000	8.033		15.033	6.600	9.100		15.700	15.366
Rank	Gymnast	Vault 1				Vault 2				Total

==== Parallel bars ====
Oldest and youngest competitors

	Name	Country	Date of birth	Age
Youngest	Oleg Verniaiev	Ukraine	29/09/93	18 years
Oldest	Mitja Petkovšek	Slovenia	06/02/77	35 years

Rank	Gymnast	D Score	E Score	Pen.	Total
1st place, gold medalist(s)	Marcel Nguyen (GER)	6.800	8.966		15.766
2nd place, silver medalist(s)	Oleg Verniaiev (UKR)	6.700	8.966		15.666
3rd place, bronze medalist(s)	Mitja Petkovšek (SLO)	6.500	9.100		15.600
4	Hamilton Sabot (FRA)	6.500	8.700		15.200
5	Samuel Piasecký (SVK)	6.200	8.966		15.166
6	Vasileios Tsolakidis (GRE)	6.400	8.400		14.800
7	Nils Haller (SUI)	6.200	8.433		14.633
8	Sebastian Krimmer (GER)	6.200	8.100		14.300

==== Horizontal bar ====
Oldest and youngest competitors

	Name	Country	Date of birth	Age
Youngest	Emin Garibov	Russia	08/09/90	22 years
Oldest	Marco Baldauf	Austria	12/11/79	32 years

Rank	Gymnast	D Score	E Score	Pen.	Total
1st place, gold medalist(s)	Emin Garibov (RUS)	7.200	8.633		15.833
2nd place, silver medalist(s)	Marijo Možnik (CRO)	6.900	8.666		15.566
3rd place, bronze medalist(s)	Vlasios Maras (GRE)	6.800	8.466		15.266
4	Eugen Spiridonov (GER)	6.500	8.600		14.900
5	Hamilton Sabot (FRA)	6.400	8.366		14.766
6	Marco Baldauf (AUT)	6.100	7.600		13.700
7	Samuel Piasecký (SVK)	6.200	7.333		13.533
8	Philipp Boy (GER)	5.900	6.299		12.166

=== Juniors ===
==== All round ====
Oldest and youngest competitors

	Name	Country	Date of birth	Age
Youngest	Paul Degouy	France	22/04/97	15 years
Oldest	Daniel Weinert	Germany	01/01/94	18 years

Rank	Gymnast	Floor (gymnastics)	Pommel horse	Rings (gymnastics)	Vault (gymnastics)	Parallel bars	Horizontal bar	Total
1st place, gold medalist(s)	Frank Baines (GBR)	13.833	14.200	13.633	15.425	14.041	13.800	84.932
2nd place, silver medalist(s)	Nile Wilson (GBR)	13.633	13.766	13.916	15.066	14.133	13.666	84.180
3rd place, bronze medalist(s)	Eddy Yusof (SUI)	13.866	13.608	13.841	15.033	13.933	13.550	83.831
4	Robert Tvorogal (LTU)	13.600	13.808	13.941	14.633	14.066	13.633	83.681
5	Daniel Weinert (GER)	13.800	13.900	13.733	14.566	14.100	12.666	82.765
6	Paul Degouy (FRA)	13.266	13.066	13.566	15.400	14.000	13.300	82.598
7	Ivan Stretovich (RUS)	14.000	13.700	13.666	14.233	13.400	13.133	82.132
8	Grigorii Zyrianov (RUS)	12.800	13.800	13.200	15.366	14.116	12.600	81.882
9	Filippo Landini (ITA)	13.133	13.183	13.533	14.566	13.500	12.966	80.881
10	Daniel Petrica Vasile Radeanu (ROU)	14.061	11.900	12.966	15.600	13.341	12.900	80.723
11	Daan Kenis (BEL)	13.975	11.066	13.300	15.166	13.600	13.158	80.265
12	Nicola Bartolini (ITA)	13.800	12.633	12.100	15.433	13.366	12.900	80.232
13	İbrahim Çolak (TUR)	13.466	12.300	13.841	14.500	13.700	12.233	80.040
14	Casimir Schmidt (NED)	13.766	13.033	13.166	15.666	12.000	12.266	79.897
15	Borja Torregrosa (ESP)	13.091	13.200	13.400	14.333	12.800	13.000	79.824
16	Lukas Schlotterer (GER)	13.233	13.233	13.150	13.600	13.400	13.166	79.782
17	Veiko Tishev (BUL)	13.033	12.400	13.625	14.366	13.300	12.800	79.524
18	Anthony Randrianasolo (FRA)	13.133	12.700	13.666	14.866	12.766	11.800	78.931
19	Christian Baumann (SUI)	13.566	12.566	13.566	15.358	10.483	13.266	78.805
20	Gavrilo Ilić (SRB)	13.500	11.875	13.183	14.433	12.633	13.033	78.657
21	Tin Srbić (CRO)	13.566	12.766	12.666	13.566	13.050	12.800	78.414
22	Ilya Yegorov (UKR)	12.900	11.600	13.133	14.466	13.600	11.600	77.299
23	Julian Perez Marchant (ESP)	13.466	10.000	13.400	15.566	12.100	12.400	76.932
24	Maxime Gentges (BEL)	13.500	12.400	12.700	13.800	12.466	11.733	76.599

==== Team ====
Rank	Team	Floor (gymnastics)	Pommel horse	Rings (gymnastics)	Vault (gymnastics)	Parallel bars	Horizontal bar	Total
1st place, gold medalist(s)	Great Britain	41.932 (2)	41.299 (1)	41.790 (1)	46.307 (1)	41.149 (3)	41.207 (1)	253.684
1st place, gold medalist(s)	Frank Baines	14.566	13.733	13.666	15.700	13.533	13.741	253.684
1st place, gold medalist(s)	Nile Wilson	13.233	13.633	13.466	15.066	13.500	14.066	253.684
1st place, gold medalist(s)	Gaius Thompson	14.133	13.933	-	15.541	-	13.400	253.684
1st place, gold medalist(s)	Courtney Tulloch	-	13.266	14.516	14.700	13.533	-	253.684
1st place, gold medalist(s)	Brinn Bevan	12.166	-	13.608	-	14.083	13.166	253.684
2nd place, silver medalist(s)	Russia	41.366 (3)	41.199 (2)	41.332 (2)	45.449 (3)	41.999 (1)	39.749 (3)	251.094
2nd place, silver medalist(s)	Grigorii Zyrianov	12.800	14.066	13.466	15.533	14.266	13.466	251.094
2nd place, silver medalist(s)	Sergey Stepanov	13.400	-	13.833	14.783	13.291	-	251.094
2nd place, silver medalist(s)	Vladislav Polyashov	-	13.533	13.833	-	13.900	12.766	251.094
2nd place, silver medalist(s)	Ivan Stretovich	13.766	13.600	13.666	14.633	13.833	13.383	251.094
2nd place, silver medalist(s)	Krill Prokopev	14.200	11.900	-	15.133	-	12.900	251.094
3rd place, bronze medalist(s)	Switzerland	41.032 (4)	40.766 (3)	41.249 (4)	45.066 (4)	41.199 (2)	40.374 (2)	249.686
3rd place, bronze medalist(s)	Eddy Yusof	13.900	13.833	13.900	14.933	14.033	13.533	249.686
3rd place, bronze medalist(s)	Marco Walter	13.966	-	-	15.700	13.600	-	249.686
3rd place, bronze medalist(s)	Christian Baumann	12.633	13.700	13.583	14.433	13.566	13.641	249.686
3rd place, bronze medalist(s)	Henji Mboyo	-	12.633	13.766	-	13.566	13.200	249.686
3rd place, bronze medalist(s)	Taha Serhani	13.166	13.233	12.766	11.883	-	13.166	249.686
4	France	39.524 (13)	38.132 (11)	41.366 (2)	45.799 (2)	40.932 (4)	39.432 (5)	245.185
4	Edgar Boulet	12.633	11.366	13.175	15.233	13.300	13.433	245.185
4	Remi Clerc	13.200	-	-	15.000	13.766	12.833	245.185
4	Paul Degouy	13.691	13.066	13.266	15.533	13.833	13.166	245.185
4	Stephen Micholet	-	11.066	14.500	-	-	-	245.185
4	Anthony Randrianasolo	12.133	13.700	13.600	15.033	13.333	12.266	245.185
5	Belgium	42.199 (1)	40.066 (4)	38.350 (9)	44.966 (5)	40.549 (5)	38.532 (7)	244.662
5	Daan Kenis	14.200	12.900	13.050	15.333	13.916	13.066	244.662
5	Bram Louwije	-	14.166	12.700	-	13.333	12.866	244.662
5	Maxime Gentges	13.933	12.500	12.600	14.833	13.233	12.600	244.662
5	Jonathan Vrolix	14.066	-	-	14.466	-	-	244.662
5	Florian Landuyt	10.900	13.000	12.166	14.800	13.300	12.400	244.662
6	Italy	40.249 (7)	39.832 (7)	39.232 (7)	44.091 (11)	40.399 (7)	38.600 (6)	242.403
6	Filippo Landini	13.283	13.100	13.433	14.325	13.600	12.800	242.403
6	Nicola Bartolini	13.900	13.666	12.633	15.233	12.866	12.600	242.403
6	Simone Bresolin	-	12.900	-	-	13.466	12.800	242.403
6	Michele Aldo Sanvito	11.966	-	12.541	14.533	-	-	242.403
6	Andrea Russo	13.066	13.066	13.166	13.966	13.333	13.000	242.403
7	Germany	39.599 (11)	39.942 (5)	38.099 (13)	44.199 (8)	39.333 (13)	39.633 (4)	240.804
7	Mike Hindermann	11.400	13.200	-	15.266	12.466	-	240.804
7	Tim Leibiger	12.566	-	12.533	14.500	12.500	13.700	240.804
7	Felix Pohl	-	11.933	11.100	-	-	12.733	240.804
7	Lukas Schlotterer	13.433	13.041	12.266	13.550	12.900	13.200	240.804
7	Daniel Weinert	13.600	13.700	13.300	14.433	13.933	11.033	240.804
8	Ukraine	40.515 (6)	38.615 (9)	39.758 (5)	44.166 (9)	40.541 (6)	35.532 (21)	239.127
8	Ilya Yegorov	13.266	13.158	13.375	14.533	13.708	11.866	239.127
8	Eduard Yermakov	13.666	12.166	13.450	12.900	13.333	11.933	239.127
8	Ruslan Kulaxizov	-	13.291	12.900	-	13.500	-	239.127
8	Volodymyr Grybuk	13.583	-	12.933	15.500	-	11.133	239.127
8	Vladyslav Kotsyuban	13.100	10.833	-	14.133	13.033	11.733	239.127

==== Floor ====
	Name	Country	Date of birth	Age
Youngest	Jonathan Vrolix	Belgium	09/11/96	15 years
Oldest	Kirill Prokopev	Russia	30/01/94	18 years

Rank	Gymnast	D Score	E Score	Pen.	Total
1st place, gold medalist(s)	Kirill Prokopev (RUS)	5.100	9.233		14.333
2nd place, silver medalist(s)	Daniel Radeanu (ROM)	5.600	8.608		14.208
3rd place, bronze medalist(s)	Daan Kenis (BEL)	5.300	9.000	0.1	14.200
3rd place, bronze medalist(s)	Andrej Korosteljev (CRO)	5.400	8.800		14.200
5	Jonathan Vrolix (BEL)	5.200	8.900		14.100
5	Frank Baines (GBR)	5.400	8.700		14.100
7	Gaius Thompson (GBR)	5.300	8.733	0.3	13.733
8	Aliaksei Kushneryk (BLR)	5.000	8.066		13.066

==== Pommel horse ====
Oldest and youngest competitors

	Name	Country	Date of birth	Age
Youngest	Gaius Thompson	United Kingdom	11/06/96	15 years
Oldest	Bank Selmeczi	Hungary	03/03/94	18 years

Rank	Gymnast	D Score	E Score	Pen.	Total
1st place, gold medalist(s)	Gaius Thompson (GBR)	5.000	9.000		14.000
2nd place, silver medalist(s)	Bram Louwije (BEL)	4.900	8.800		13.700
3rd place, bronze medalist(s)	Eddy Yusof (SUI)	4.800	8.666		13.466
4	Bank Selmeczi (HUN)	5.200	7.333		12.533
5	Frank Baines (GBR)	4.800	7.266		12.066
6	Grigorii Zyrianov (RUS)	4.200	7.466		11.666
7	Vagner Levente (HUN)	5.100	6.233		11.333
8	Renato Prpic (CRO)	3.800	7.500		11.300

==== Rings ====
Oldest and youngest competitors

	Name	Country	Date of birth	Age
Youngest	Henji Mboyo	Switzerland	03/12/98	13 years
Oldest	Sergey Stepanov and Stephen Micholet	Russia and France	26/05/94	18 years

Rank	Gymnast	D Score	E Score	Pen.	Total
1st place, gold medalist(s)	Courtney Tulloch (GBR)	5.700	8.825		14.525
2nd place, silver medalist(s)	Stephen Micholet (FRA)	5.700	8.733		14.433
3rd place, bronze medalist(s)	Eddy Yusof (SUI)	5.200	8.741		13.941
4	İbrahim Çolak (TUR)	5.100	8.800		13.900
5	Sergey Stepanov (RUS)	5.400	8.350		13.750
6	Henji Mboyo (SUI)	4.800	8.866		13.666
7	Vladislav Polyashov (RUS)	4.900	8.566		13.466
8	Michalis Krasias (CYP)	4.800	8.633		13.433

==== Vault ====
Oldest and youngest competitors

	Name	Country	Date of birth	Age
Youngest	Paul Degouy	France	22/04/97	15 years
Oldest	Julian Perez Marchant	Spain	02/04/94	18 years

Rank	Gymnast	D Score	E Score	Pen.	Score 1	D Score	E Score	Pen.	Score 2	Total
1st place, gold medalist(s)	Casimir Schmidt (NED)	6.600	9.066	0.1	15.566	6.200	8.800		15.000	15.283
2nd place, silver medalist(s)	Daniel Radeanu (ROM)	6.600	8.966		15.566	6.200	8.733	0.1	14.833	15.199
3rd place, bronze medalist(s)	Marco Walter (SUI)	6.600	8.700	0.1	15.200	6.200	8.966		15.166	15.183
4	Julian Perez Marchant (ESP)	6.600	9.166		15.766	5.400	9.083		14.483	15.124
5	Gaius Thompson (GBR)	6.200	9.216		15.416	5.800	8.900	0.1	14.600	15.008
6	Edgar Boulet (FRA)	6.200	8.933		15.133	5.800	8.891	0.1	14.591	14.862
7	Paul Degouy (FRA)	6.200	9.050	0.1	14.858	5.400	9.166		14.566	14.858
8	Daan Kenis (BEL)	6.200	8.900		15.100	5.800	8.400	0.3	13.900	14.500
Rank	Gymnast	Vault 1				Vault 2				Total

==== Parallel bars ====
Oldest and youngest competitors

	Name	Country	Date of birth	Age
Youngest	Brinn Bevan	United Kingdom	16/06/97	14 years
Oldest	Daniel Weinert	Germany	01/01/94	18 years

Rank	Gymnast	D Score	E Score	Pen.	Total
1st place, gold medalist(s)	Grigorii Zyrianov (RUS)	5.200	9.066		14.266
2nd place, silver medalist(s)	Daniel Weinert (GER)	5.200	8.833		14.033
2nd place, silver medalist(s)	İbrahim Çolak (TUR)	5.100	8.933		14.033
4	Paul Degouy (FRA)	4.800	9.166		13.966
5	Brinn Bevan (GBR)	5.400	8.400		13.800
6	Vladislav Polyashov (RUS)	5.100	8.466		13.566
7	Daan Kenis (BEL)	5.000	8.533		13.533
8	Eddy Yusof (SUI)	5.200	8.033		13.233

==== Horizontal bar ====
Oldest and youngest competitors

	Name	Country	Date of birth	Age
Youngest	Ivan Stretovich	Russia	06/10/96	15 years
Oldest	Tim Leibiger	Germany	08/08/94	17 years

Rank	Gymnast	D Score	E Score	Pen.	Total
1st place, gold medalist(s)	Frank Baines (GBR)	4.900	8.933		13.833
2nd place, silver medalist(s)	Eddy Yusof (SUI)	4.700	9.000		13.700
3rd place, bronze medalist(s)	Grigorii Zyrianov (RUS)	4.800	8.866		13.666
4	Nile Wilson (GBR)	5.000	8.533		13.533
5	Christian Baumann (SUI)	5.100	8.366		13.466
6	Edgar Boulet (FRA)	5.000	8.300		13.300
7	Ivan Stretovich (RUS)	4.600	8.133		12.733
8	Tim Leibiger (GER)	3.900	3.533		7.433

== Medal count ==
=== Combined ===
Rank	Nation	Gold	Silver	Bronze	Total
1	Great Britain	6	2	0	8
2	Russia	4	2	3	9
3	Romania	1	3	1	5
4	Germany	1	1	0	2
5	Greece	1	0	1	2
6	Hungary	1	0	0	1
6	Netherlands	1	0	0	1
8	Ukraine	0	2	0	2
9	Switzerland	0	1	5	6
10	Belgium	0	1	1	2
10	Croatia	0	1	1	2
10	France	0	1	1	2
13	Italy	0	1	0	1
13	Turkey	0	1	0	1
15	Armenia	0	0	1	1
15	Israel	0	0	1	1
15	Slovenia	0	0	1	1
Totals (17 entries)		15	16	16	47

=== Seniors ===
Rank	Nation	Gold	Silver	Bronze	Total
1	Russia	2	1	2	5
2	Romania	1	1	1	3
3	Great Britain	1	1	0	2
4	Greece	1	0	1	2
5	Germany	1	0	0	1
5	Hungary	1	0	0	1
7	Ukraine	0	2	0	2
8	Croatia	0	1	0	1
8	Italy	0	1	0	1
10	Armenia	0	0	1	1
10	France	0	0	1	1
10	Israel	0	0	1	1
10	Slovenia	0	0	1	1
Totals (13 entries)		7	7	8	22

=== Juniors ===
Rank	Nation	Gold	Silver	Bronze	Total
1	Great Britain	5	1	0	6
2	Russia	2	1	1	4
3	Netherlands	1	0	0	1
4	Romania	0	2	0	2
5	Switzerland	0	1	5	6
6	Belgium	0	1	1	2
7	France	0	1	0	1
7	Germany	0	1	0	1
7	Turkey	0	1	0	1
10	Croatia	0	0	1	1
Totals (10 entries)		8	9	8	25
