= Kristian Thomas =

British artistic gymnast

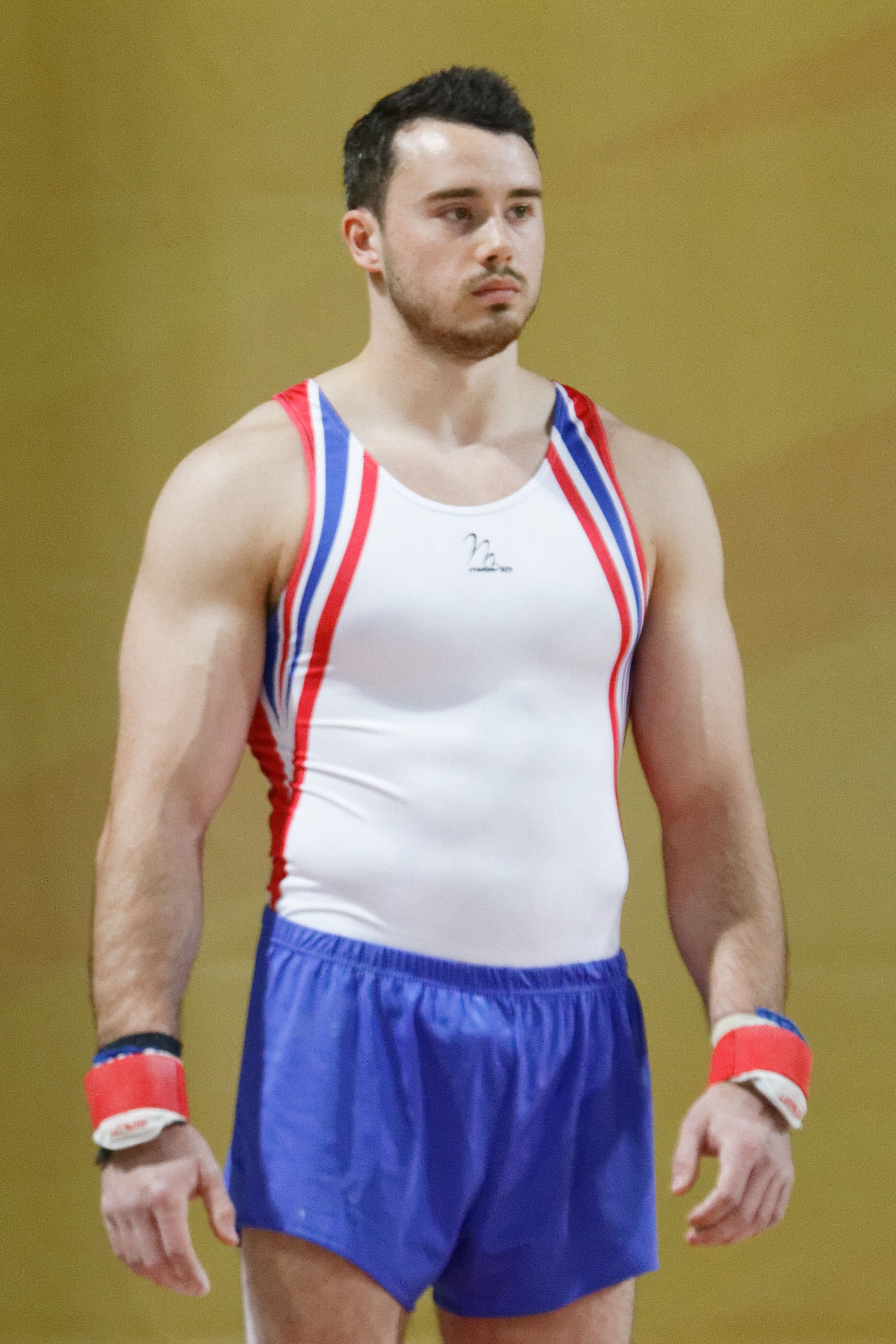
- Thomas at the 2015 European Championships

Personal information
- Full name: Kristian James Thomas
- Born: 14 February 1989 (age 37) Wolverhampton, Staffordshire, United Kingdom
- Height: 180 cm (5 ft 11 in)

Gymnastics career
- Discipline: Men's artistic gymnastics
- Country represented: (United Kingdom) Great Britain; England; (2006–2017)
- Club: Earls Gymnastics Club
- Head coaches: Michelle Bradley; Andrei Popov
- Retired: 19 October 2017
Medal record
Representing Great Britain
Olympic Games
Bronze medal – third place	2012 London	Team
World Championships
Silver medal – second place	2015 Glasgow	Team
Bronze medal – third place	2013 Antwerp	Vault
European Championships
Gold medal – first place	2012 Montpellier	Team
Gold medal – first place	2015 Montpellier	Floor exercise
Silver medal – second place	2010 Birmingham	Team
Silver medal – second place	2014 Sofia	Team
Silver medal – second place	2016 Bern	Team
Silver medal – second place	2016 Bern	Horizontal bar
Bronze medal – third place	2014 Sofia	Horizontal bar
Representing England
Commonwealth Games
Gold medal – first place	2014 Glasgow	Team
Silver medal – second place	2014 Glasgow	Vault
Silver medal – second place	2014 Glasgow	Horizontal bar
Bronze medal – third place	2006 Melbourne	Team

Kristian James Thomas (born 14 February 1989 in Wolverhampton) is a British former artistic gymnast. A long-standing member of both the England and Great Britain men's teams, he was a member of the British team that won gold in the 2012 European Championships team event, and a historic bronze in the same event at the 2012 Summer Olympics. He won his first global individual medal in the 2013 World Championships, a bronze in vault; it was also the first global medal ever won in vault by a British male gymnast. In 2015 he won his first major international title, gold in the floor exercise at the 2015 European Artistic Gymnastics Championships.

== Gymnastics career ==
Thomas was coached by Michelle Bradley and Alexei Popov, and was a member of the Earls gymnastics club. He was born in Wolverhampton.

In 2006, Thomas attended the Commonwealth Games in Melbourne, Australia, where he placed 12th and helped the English gymnastics team win the bronze medal.

Thomas rose to prominence in British gymnastics when he won the British all-around title in 2008. Floor is his best event, and during his Senior career he has won several silver medals on floor in International competitions. At the 2009 World Artistic Gymnastics Championships in London, he placed 6th in the All-Around. He was also part of the British men's team that represented Great Britain at the 2010 World Artistic Gymnastics Championships in Rotterdam and the 2011 World Artistic Gymnastics Championships in Tokyo.

After the men's team initially failed to qualify for the 2012 Summer Olympics in London, Thomas gave a solid performance at the London Prepares FIG Olympic Test event. The men's team qualified more than 7 points ahead of the silver medal team, France, and Thomas placed 2nd in the All-Around behind teammate Daniel Purvis, as well as qualifying to several finals. In the finals he won a Bronze on Floor, Bronze on Vault and Gold on High Bar.

=== 2012 and 2013 ===
==== Summer Olympics in London ====
At the London Olympics, Thomas was part of the bronze medal-winning GB men's team, competing on 30 July 2012 at the North Greenwich Arena .

In this team final, he vaulted with a massive score of 16.550.

In October, 2013, Thomas competed at the 2013 World Artistic Gymnastics Championships in Antwerp, Belgium. In the vault final, he won the bronze with the score of 15.233, behind Yang Hak-Seon and Steven Legendre.

=== 2014 ===
==== European Championships ====
On May 19–25, 2014, at the 2014 European Championships in Sofia. Thomas, along with his teammates Daniel Keatings, Daniel Purvis, Max Whitlock, and Sam Oldham, won Team Great Britain the silver medal behind Russia with a total score of 262.087 points. In event finals, Thomas won the bronze medal in high bar (14.808) behind teammate Sam Oldham.

==== Commonwealth Games ====
In July and August, at the 2014 Commonwealth Games held in Glasgow, Thomas contributed a score of 58.599 for the England team and won gold. He qualified for the vault final with a score of 15.100, and also finished in 8th in the Floor final. With a score of 15.033, he also qualified for the Horizontal bar final. He won silver for vault with a score of 14.499, coming behind Canadian gymnast Scott Morgan. Thomas scored 14.966 on Horizontal Bar, matching teammate Nile Wilson's score, but scoring lower on execution to win silver.

On 19 October 2017, Kristian announced his retirement from gymnastics.

== Post-gymnastics career ==
In January 2022, Thomas became the Player Care & Engagement Manager at the Premier League. In October 2022, Thomas ran the 2022 London Marathon.
