= Denis Ablyazin =

Russian artistic gymnast

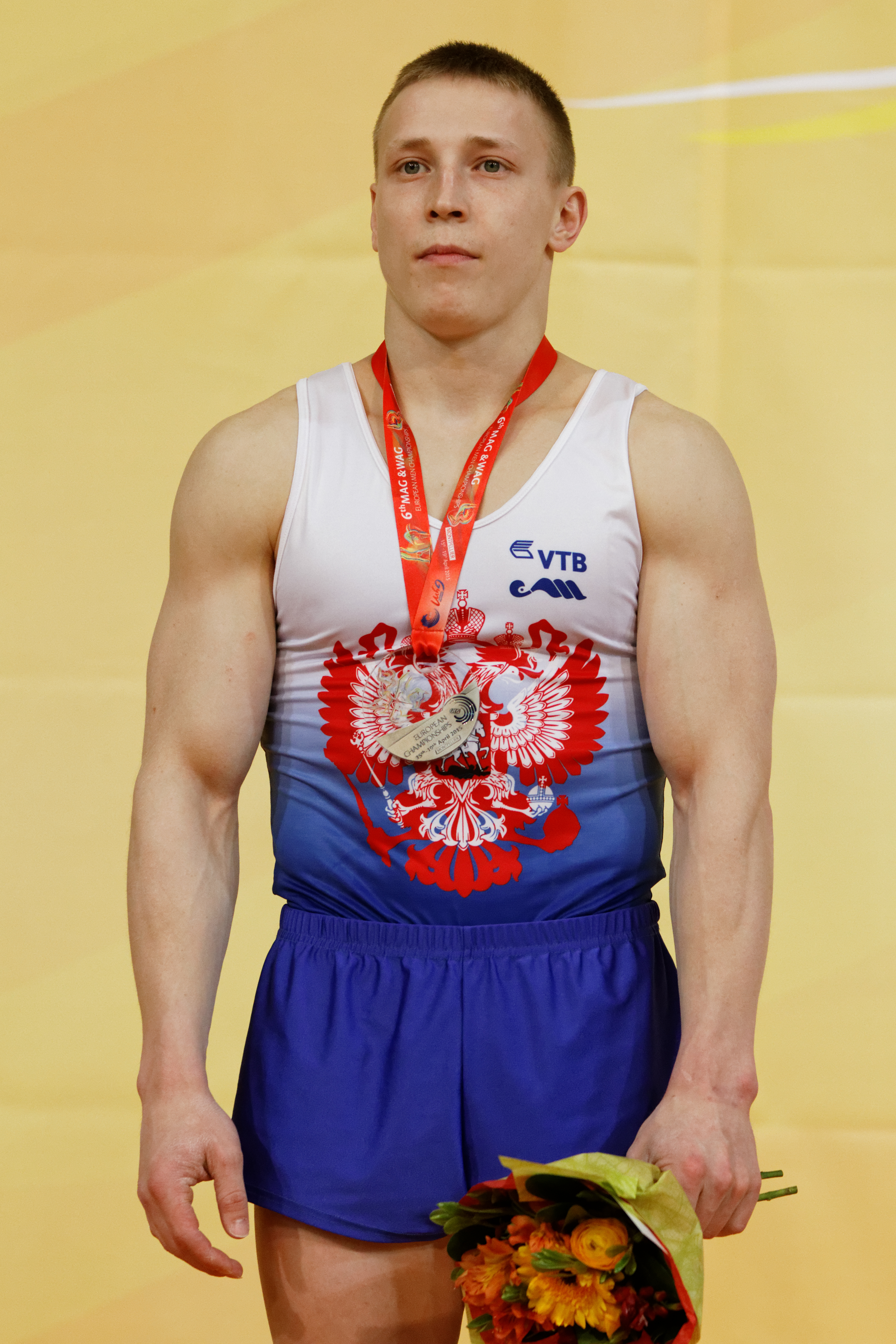
- Ablyazin at the 2015 European Championships

Personal information
- Full name: Denis Mikhailovich Ablyazin
- Nickname: The Lord of the Rings
- Born: August 3, 1992 (age 34) Penza, Russia
- Height: 1.60 m (5 ft 3 in)

Gymnastics career
- Discipline: Men's artistic gymnastics
- Country represented: Russia
- Club: Dinamo Penza
- Gym: "Burtases"
- Head coach: Anatoly Zabelin
- Assistant coach: Sergei Starkin
Medal record
Representing Russia & ROC
Event	1st	2nd	3rd
Olympic Games	1	4	2
World Championships	2	1	1
European Championships	8	4	2
Summer Universiade	1	2	0
Total	12	11	5
Representing ROC
Olympic Games
Gold medal – first place	2020 Tokyo	Team
Silver medal – second place	2020 Tokyo	Vault
Representing Russia
Olympic Games
Silver medal – second place	2012 London	Vault
Silver medal – second place	2016 Rio de Janeiro	Vault
Silver medal – second place	2016 Rio de Janeiro	Team
Bronze medal – third place	2012 London	Floor Exercise
Bronze medal – third place	2016 Rio de Janeiro	Rings
World Championships
Gold medal – first place	2014 Nanning	Floor Exercise
Gold medal – first place	2019 Stuttgart	Team
Silver medal – second place	2017 Montreal	Rings
Bronze medal – third place	2014 Nanning	Rings
European Championships
Gold medal – first place	2013 Moscow	Vault
Gold medal – first place	2014 Sofia	Team
Gold medal – first place	2014 Sofia	Floor Exercise
Gold medal – first place	2014 Sofia	Rings
Gold medal – first place	2014 Sofia	Vault
Gold medal – first place	2016 Bern	Team
Gold medal – first place	2019 Szczecin	Rings
Gold medal – first place	2019 Szczecin	Vault
Silver medal – second place	2012 Montpellier	Team
Silver medal – second place	2015 Montpellier	Rings
Silver medal – second place	2015 Montpellier	Vault
Silver medal – second place	2016 Bern	Rings
Bronze medal – third place	2012 Montpellier	Rings
Bronze medal – third place	2012 Montpellier	Vault
Summer Universiade
Gold medal – first place	2013 Kazan	Team
Silver medal – second place	2013 Kazan	Rings
Silver medal – second place	2013 Kazan	Vault

Denis Mikhailovich Ablyazin (Russian: Денис Михайлович Аблязин, IPA: [dʲɪˈnʲis ɐˈblʲæzʲɪn], born 3 August 1992) is a Russian artistic gymnast. Ablyazin is Olympic Champion 2020 in Tokyo and a seven-time Olympic Games medalist. At the 2012 London Olympics he won silver in vault and bronze in floor. At the 2016 Rio de Janeiro Olympics, he won silver with the Russian men's team, a silver in vault and bronze in rings.

He is also three-time European vault champion (2013, 2014 and 2019), the 2014 European champion on floor and rings and the 2014 World Champion on floor.

== Personal life ==
Ablyazin was born on 3 August 1992 in Penza, Russia. He represents Russia.

In September 2016, Ablyazin married Ksenia Semyonova, a Russian former gymnast who won two world titles. On January 21, 2017, their son, Yaroslav Ablyazin, was born. Denis and Ksenia separated in 2018 and later divorced, with Semyonova taking full custody of their son. Ablyazin remarried in 2021.

== Career ==
After trying multiple sports as a child, Ablyazin finally chose artistic gymnastics, the sport he excelled in the most. The sport truly appealed to him after he brought home a gold medal from a youth version of the sports festival, Spartakiad, hosted by his primary school in Chelyabinsk, Russia.

=== 2011 ===
In March, Ablyazin competed at Artistic Gymnastics World Cup in Cottbus, Germany. In the event finals he placed fourth on floor with a score of 14.925 and third on vault with a score of 16.050. In April, he competed at the European Championships in Berlin, Germany, where he finished sixth in the floor exercise final, scoring 15.250.

In October, Ablyazin competed at the World Championships in Tokyo, Japan. He contributed scores of a 15.033 on floor, 15.000 on rings and 16.266 on vault toward the Russian team's fourth-place finish. Individually, he placed fifth in the vault final with a score of 16.174, after qualifying in ninth place and being brought in as a reserve when Marian Drăgulescu of Romania withdrew from the competition due to injury.

=== 2012 ===
In May, Ablyazin was selected, alongside Emin Garibov, David Belyavskiy, Anton Golotsutskov and Aleksandr Balandin to represent Russia at the 2012 European Championships in Montpellier, France. He contributed scores of a 15.266 on floor, 15.241 on rings and 16.066 on vault toward Russia's second-place finish. He won two bronze medals in the rings and vault finals, scoring a 15.433 on rings and 16.062 on vault.

==== 2012 London Olympics ====
Ablyazin competed for the national team at the 2012 Summer Olympics in the men's artistic team all-around. He was the only Russian male artistic gymnast to win two medals, a bronze on floor and a silver on vault behind Yang Hak-Seon of South Korea, at the 2012 Summer Olympics. On the floor, his score tied him for the second-highest score of the night with Kohei Uchimura of Japan and only Zou Kai of China had surpassed him. However, after applying tie breaking rules in gymnastics for the Olympics, Uchimura ended up with the silver and relegated Ablyazin to the bronze. With a D-score of 7.1 on floor, he also executed the most difficult routine during the event final with an extra pass and barely finished his routine in time, right at the sound of the final warning bell indicating his time was over.

=== 2013 ===
In March, Ablyazin competed at the World Cup, which was held in France, where he won gold on rings and placed second on floor. In April, he won the gold medal in the vault final at the 2013 European Championships in Moscow, Russia, scoring 15.408.

In July, Ablyazin, alongside the Russian team (Nikolai Kuksenkov, Emin Garibov, David Belyavskiy and Nikita Ignatyev) competed at the 2013 Summer Universiade in Kazan, Russia, where they won the gold medal, ahead of Ukraine and Japan. In the event finals, he placed second both on rings and vault.

In September, Ablyazin competed at the World Championships in Antwerp, Belgium, but failed to qualify for any event finals. There was no team event in 2013 as is customary at worlds held immediately after an Olympic year.

=== 2014 ===
At the start of the season, Ablyazin competed at the World Cup in Cottbus, Germany and placed first in the rings and floor finals. In May, he and his teammates (Nikolai Kuksenkov, Aleksandr Balandin, Nikita Ignatyev, David Belyavskiy), competed at the 2014 European Championships in Sofia, Bulgaria. Ablyazin contributed scores of 15.833 on floor, 15.500 on rings and 15.366 on vault towards Russia's gold with a total score of 267.959, ahead of Great Britain. Ablyazin placed first in all individual finals he qualified for, winning gold on floor with a score of 15.700, and scoring 15.800 (tied with teammate Aleksandr Balandin) on rings with a total of 15.150 on vault.

Ablyazin won a total of four gold medals making him the most successful gymnast in the entire 2014 European Championships. He was the first gymnast to win four gold medals in a single European Championships since Marian Drăgulescu in 2004.

In October, Ablyazin competed at the 2014 World Championships in Nanning, China and helped the Russian team to a fifth-place finish. In the apparatus finals, Ablyazin had qualified for three events. Ablyazin even surprised himself to finish ahead of defending champion Kenzō Shirai of Japan and win his first gold medal on floor, scoring 15.750, with just 0.017 difference in their scores, after Shirai stepped out-of-bounds in his third pass and incurred a 0.1 point penalty. Ablyazin's routine in that floor final had the second-highest difficulty score of 7.1 behind Shirai's 7.4, and they were the only two finalist who had difficult values scoring above 7.0. Ablyazin took home the bronze medal on rings too with a score of 15.700. Although he did also qualify for the vault final, he fell on both vaults and finished eighth.

=== 2016 ===
On May 25–29, Ablyazin (together with David Belyavskiy, Nikolai Kuksenkov, Nikita Ignatyev and Nikita Nagornyy) won Russia the Team gold at the 2016 European Championships, he qualified to two apparatus finals taking silver in Ring and finished seventh in Vault.

==== 2016 Rio Olympics ====
On August 6–16, Ablyazin competed with the Russian Team (together with Ivan Stretovich, Nikita Nagornyy, Nikolai Kuksenkov and David Belyavskiy) at the 2016 Summer Olympics in Rio de Janeiro, he contributed scores of 15.100 in floor, 15.700 in rings, 15.600 vault, helping the Russian men's team win the silver medal with a total of 271.453 points. Ablyazin also qualified to two apparatus finals where he won bronze in rings and silver in vault behind Ri Se Gwang.

=== 2017 ===
Ablyazin took a hiatus after the Olympic season to recover from sustained ankle injuries and spent time with his new son Yaroslav. On August 23–27, Ablyazin returned to competition at the Russian Cup where he won bronze in the team event and gold in rings.

On October 2–8, 2017, Ablyazin competed at the 2017 World Championships in Montreal, Canada and finished with only one medal, a silver in the individual still rings event final with a combined score of 15.333 behind the 15.433 posted by the gold medalist Eleftherios Petrounias of Greece. As is customary again, no team event was held at this world championships due to 2016 being an Olympic year.

=== 2019 ===
In April, Ablyazin competed at the European Championships in Szczecin, Poland. He placed first on vault and rings.

In October, Ablyazin competed at the World Championships in Stuttgart, Germany. He placed sixth on rings, and his team won first overall.

=== 2021 ===
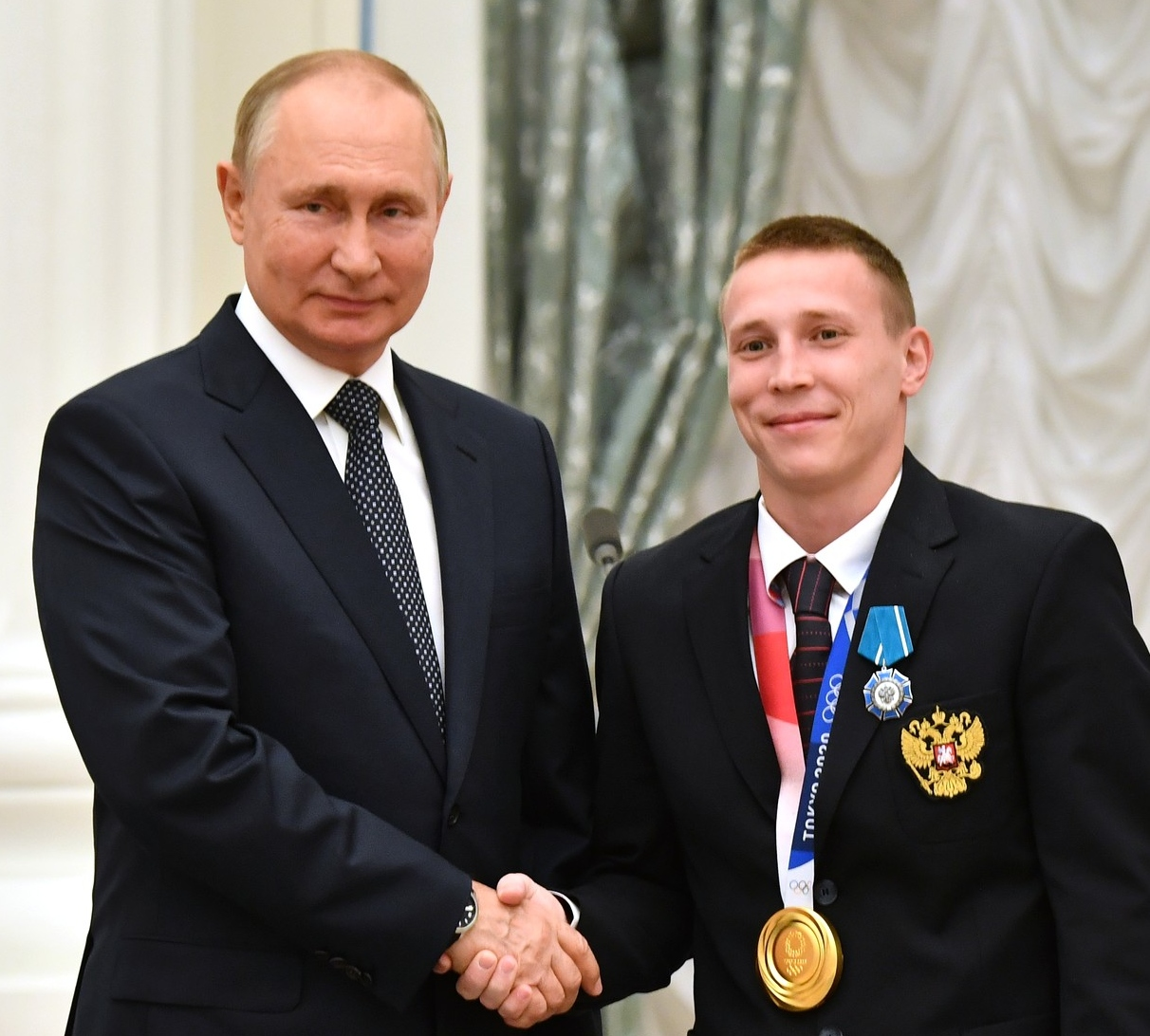
Ablyazin receives the Order of Honour from Vladimir Putin in 2021

==== 2020 Tokyo Olympics ====
At the 2020 Summer Olympics in Tokyo, Japan, Denis Ablyazin competed with the Russian Olympic Committee team, which featured Ablyazin, David Belyavskiy, Artur Dalaoyan, and Nikita Nagornyy. The Russian team won Olympic gold with a combined score of 262.5. Ablyazin competed on floor (13.9), rings (15.033), and vault (14.866). He also defended his silver medal on the individual vault event for a second time with a final score of 14.783, a number which tied for the highest score. He was positioned lower than Shin Jea-hwan of South Korea on a tie-breaking criteria, similarly to the individual floor final at the 2012 Summer Olympics in London when he posted the second highest final score of 15.800 but tie-breaking rules awarded him the bronze medal behind Kōhei Uchimura of Japan.

On September 11, 2021, Ablyazin, together with his gold medal-winning Olympic teammates, was awarded with the Order of Friendship medals by President Vladimir Putin.

== Competitive history ==
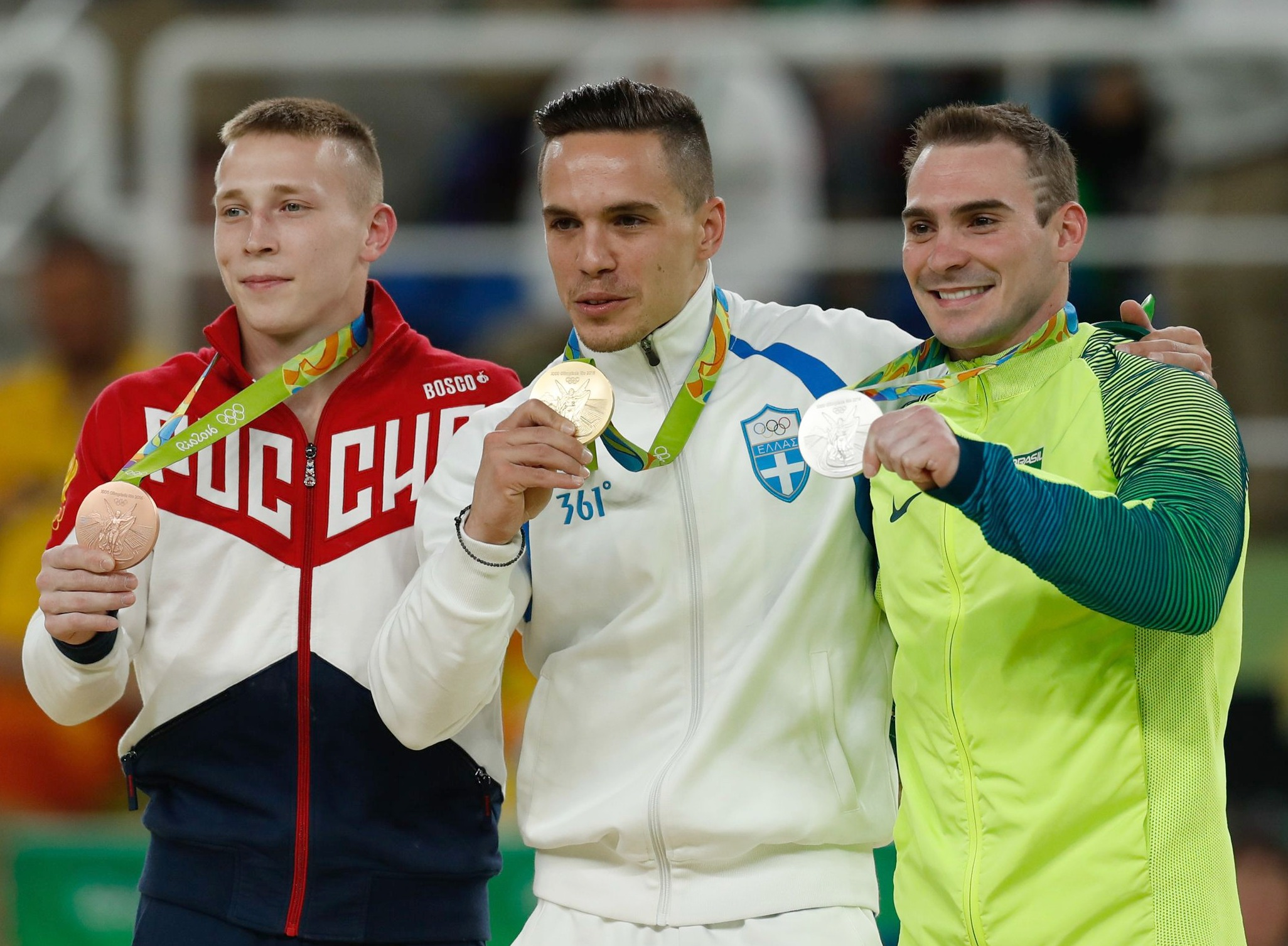
Ablyazin, bronze medalist in men's rings at the 2016 Summer Olympics

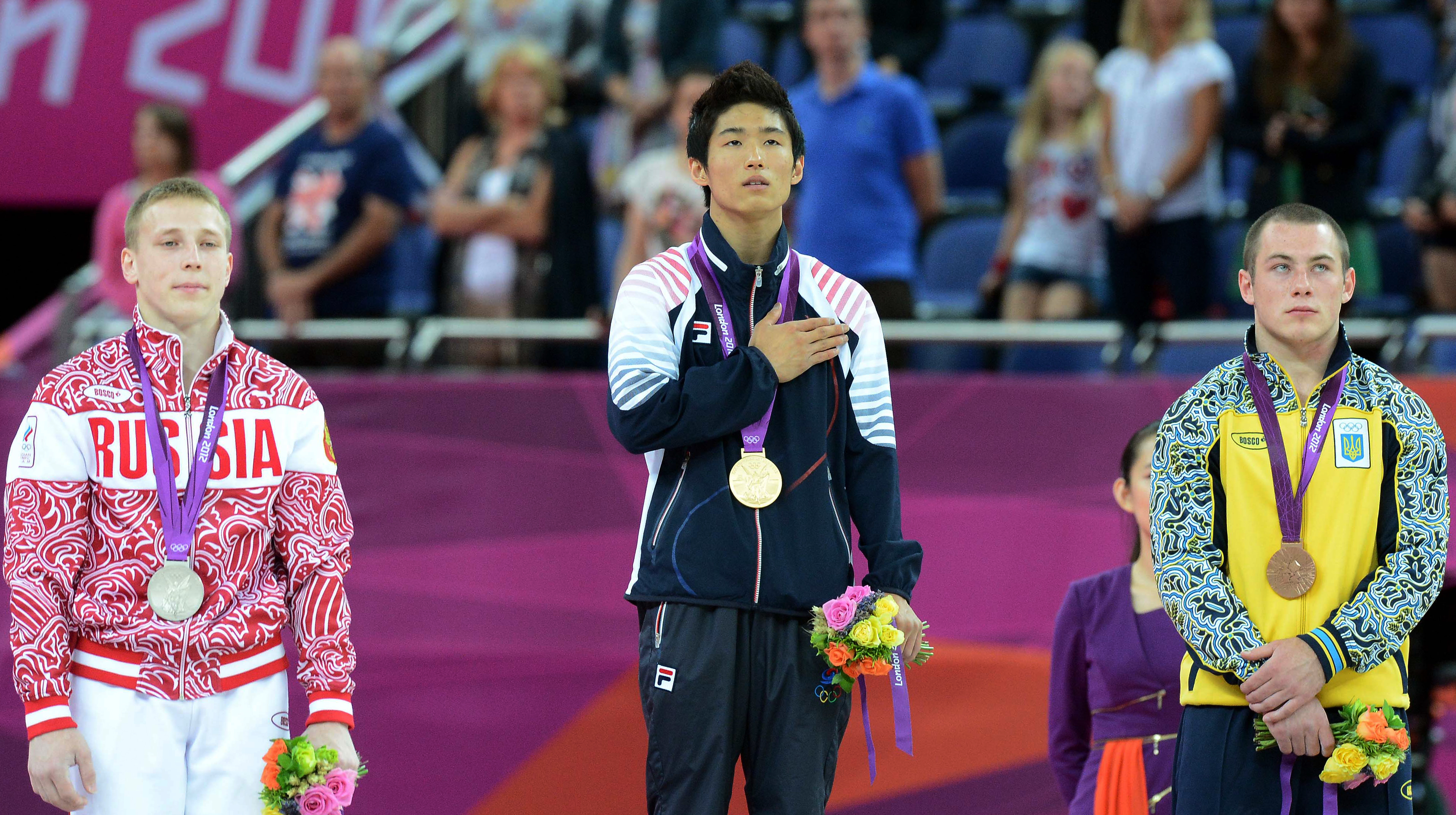
Ablyazin, silver medalist in men's vault at the 2012 Summer Olympics

Year	Event	All-Around		Individual (Ind.) Apparatuses					
Year	Event	Team	Ind.	FX	PH	SR	VT	PB	HB
2011	National Championships	1st				3rd	7th		
2011	European Championships			6th					
2011	World Championships	4th					5th		
2012	National Championships	2nd		1st		3rd	1st		
2012	European Championships	2nd		6th		3rd			
2012	Olympic Games	6th		3rd		5th	2nd		
2013	National Championships	2nd		1st		1st			
2013	European Championships					5th	1st		
2013	Universiade	1st		7th		2nd			
2013	World Championships	—N/a							
2014	National Championships	1st		1st		2nd	1st		
2014	European Championships	1st		1st		1st			
2014	World Championships	5th		1st		3rd	8th		
2015	National Championships	3rd		1st		1st			
2015	European Championships					2nd			
2015	World Championships	4th					6th		
2016	National Championships	1st		2nd		1st			
2016	European Championships	1st				2nd	7th		
2016	Olympic Games	2nd				3rd	2nd		
2017	Russian Cup	3rd		4th		1st	5th		
2017	World Championships	—N/a				2nd			
2019
2019	European Championships					1st			
2019	World Championships	1st				6th			
2020/21
2020/21	Olympic Games	1st				6th	2nd		

== See also ==
- List of Olympic male artistic gymnasts for Russia
