= Gymnastics at the 2014 Asian Games – Men's horizontal bar =

Men's horizontal bar at the 2014 Asian Games
- Venue: Namdong Gymnasium
- Date: 21–25 September 2014
- Competitors: 56 from 17 nations

Medalists
gold medal	Zou Kai	China
silver medal	Yusuke Saito	Japan
bronze medal	Masayoshi Yamamoto	Japan

The men's horizontal bar competition at the 2014 Asian Games in Incheon, South Korea was held on 21 and 25 September 2014 at the Namdong Gymnasium.

== Schedule ==
All times are Korea Standard Time (UTC+09:00)

Date	Time	Event
Sunday, 21 September 2014	10:00	Qualification
Thursday, 25 September 2014	22:10	Final

== Results ==
=== Qualification ===
Rank	Athlete	Score
1	Zou Kai (CHN)	15.350
2	Park Min-soo (KOR)	15.050
3	Masayoshi Yamamoto (JPN)	14.850
4	Yusuke Saito (JPN)	14.850
5	Yuya Kamoto (JPN)	14.600
6	Yang Shengchao (CHN)	14.600
7	Lee Hyeok-jung (KOR)	14.225
8	Syque Caesar (BAN)	14.200
9	Shek Wai Hung (HKG)	14.100
10	Huang Xi (CHN)	14.050
11	Lee Sang-wook (KOR)	13.875
12	Stepan Gorbachev (KAZ)	13.850
12	Ilya Kornev (KAZ)	13.850
14	Kim Kwang-chun (PRK)	13.800
15	Tomomasa Hasegawa (JPN)	13.650
16	Wang Peng (CHN)	13.625
17	Han Jong-hyok (PRK)	13.600
18	Đinh Phương Thành (VIE)	13.550
19	Yang Hak-seon (KOR)	13.350
20	Shin Dong-hyen (KOR)	13.200
21	Kim Jin-hyok (PRK)	13.150
22	Kazuyuki Takeda (JPN)	13.150
23	Phạm Phước Hưng (VIE)	13.100
24	Gabriel Gan (SIN)	12.925
25	Eduard Shaulov (UZB)	12.900
26	Lê Thanh Tùng (VIE)	12.900
27	Lee Chih-kai (TPE)	12.850
28	Huang Yuguo (CHN)	12.800
29	Azizbek Kudratullayev (KAZ)	12.750
30	Nurbol Babylov (KAZ)	12.700
31	Hoàng Cường (VIE)	12.600
32	Ashish Kumar (IND)	12.550
33	Rakesh Kumar Patra (IND)	12.550
34	Rasuljon Abdurakhimov (UZB)	12.450
35	Aditya Singh Rana (IND)	12.450
36	Hsu Ping-chien (TPE)	12.400
37	Otabek Masharipov (UZB)	12.400
38	Huang Ta-yu (TPE)	12.350
39	Salokhiddin Mirzaev (UZB)	12.325
40	Hadi Khanarinejad (IRI)	12.250
41	Lin Yi-chieh (TPE)	12.200
42	Pürevdorjiin Otgonbat (MGL)	12.050
43	Ra Won-chol (PRK)	12.050
44	Abhijit Ishwar Shinde (IND)	12.000
45	Aizat Jufrie (SIN)	11.950
46	Đỗ Vũ Hưng (VIE)	11.950
47	Mohammad Reza Hamidi (IRI)	11.700
48	Chandan Pathak (IND)	11.500
49	Saeid Reza Keikha (IRI)	11.400
50	Ryang Kuk-chol (PRK)	11.175
51	Mönkhtsogiin Ariunbulag (MGL)	11.100
52	Mohammad Ramezanpour (IRI)	11.100
53	Iman Khamoushi (IRI)	10.650
54	Yousef Al-Sahhaf (KUW)	10.600
55	Abdullah Al-Boussi (KSA)	10.075
56	Ahmed Al-Dyani (QAT)	7.900

=== Final ===
Rank	Athlete	Score
1st place, gold medalist(s)	Zou Kai (CHN)	15.800
2nd place, silver medalist(s)	Yusuke Saito (JPN)	15.533
3rd place, bronze medalist(s)	Masayoshi Yamamoto (JPN)	15.491
4	Lee Sang-wook (KOR)	15.000
5	Yang Shengchao (CHN)	14.733
6	Park Min-soo (KOR)	14.366
7	Syque Caesar (BAN)	14.133
8	Shek Wai Hung (HKG)	13.366
