= Gymnastics at the 2014 Asian Games – Men's floor =

Men's floor at the 2014 Asian Games
- Venue: Namdong Gymnasium
- Date: 21–24 September 2014
- Competitors: 69 from 21 nations

Medalists
gold medal	Zou Kai	China
silver medal	Huang Yuguo	China
bronze medal	Yuya Kamoto	Japan

The men's floor competition at the 2014 Asian Games in Incheon, South Korea was held on 21 and 24 September 2014 at the Namdong Gymnasium.

== Schedule ==
All times are Korea Standard Time (UTC+09:00)

Date	Time	Event
Sunday, 21 September 2014	10:00	Qualification
Wednesday, 24 September 2014	19:00	Final

== Results ==
=== Qualification ===
Rank	Athlete	Score
1	Shotaro Shirai (JPN)	15.450
2	Zou Kai (CHN)	15.350
3	Ri Se-gwang (PRK)	15.200
4	Yuya Kamoto (JPN)	14.975
5	Shin Dong-hyen (KOR)	14.950
6	Huang Yuguo (CHN)	14.950
7	Kazuyuki Takeda (JPN)	14.900
8	Yang Hak-seon (KOR)	14.850
9	Huang Xi (CHN)	14.750
10	Wang Peng (CHN)	14.700
11	Lee Chih-kai (TPE)	14.550
12	Stepan Gorbachev (KAZ)	14.450
13	Eduard Shaulov (UZB)	14.450
14	Yang Shengchao (CHN)	14.450
14	Ashish Kumar (IND)	14.450
16	Yusuke Saito (JPN)	14.425
17	Lee Sang-wook (KOR)	14.425
18	Reyland Capellan (PHI)	14.400
19	Masayoshi Yamamoto (JPN)	14.350
20	Đỗ Vũ Hưng (VIE)	14.300
21	Chen Chih-yu (TPE)	14.200
22	Mohammad Ramezanpour (IRI)	14.200
23	Ryang Kuk-chol (PRK)	14.150
24	Kim Hee-hoon (KOR)	14.100
25	Đinh Phương Thành (VIE)	14.050
26	Bobby Kriangkum (THA)	14.050
27	Abdullah Al-Boussi (KSA)	14.050
28	Lin Yi-chieh (TPE)	14.000
29	Hoe Wah Toon (SIN)	14.000
30	Ganbatyn Erdenebold (MGL)	13.900
30	Lê Thanh Tùng (VIE)	13.900
32	Maxim Petrishko (KAZ)	13.850
33	Saeid Reza Keikha (IRI)	13.850
34	Syque Caesar (BAN)	13.700
35	Chandan Pathak (IND)	13.600
36	Iman Khamoushi (IRI)	13.600
37	Park Min-soo (KOR)	13.600
38	Terry Tay (SIN)	13.600
39	Han Jong-hyok (PRK)	13.550
40	Hsu Ping-chien (TPE)	13.500
41	Hadi Khanarinejad (IRI)	13.400
42	Kim Kwang-chun (PRK)	13.400
43	Ahmed Al-Dyani (QAT)	13.400
44	Mohammad Reza Hamidi (IRI)	13.375
45	Gabriel Gan (SIN)	13.250
46	Otabek Masharipov (UZB)	13.225
47	Huang Ta-yu (TPE)	13.150
48	Đặng Nam (VIE)	13.100
49	Pürevdorjiin Otgonbat (MGL)	13.100
50	Ng Kiu Chung (HKG)	13.050
51	Aditya Singh Rana (IND)	12.975
52	Jaffar Al-Sayigh (KSA)	12.900
53	Nurbol Babylov (KAZ)	12.900
54	Mönkhtsogiin Ariunbulag (MGL)	12.700
55	Rakesh Kumar Patra (IND)	12.400
56	Abhijit Ishwar Shinde (IND)	12.400
57	Salokhiddin Mirzaev (UZB)	12.150
58	Ali Al-Kandari (KUW)	12.050
59	Ra Won-chol (PRK)	11.950
60	Yousef Al-Sahhaf (KUW)	11.950
61	Rasuljon Abdurakhimov (UZB)	11.850
62	Ilya Kornev (KAZ)	11.750
63	Aizat Jufrie (SIN)	11.600
64	Abdulaziz Al-Johani (KSA)	11.550
65	Nishan Simkhada (NEP)	11.100
66	Muhammad Afzal (PAK)	10.150
67	Kabin Raj Shrestha (NEP)	9.050
68	Muhammad Yasir (PAK)	8.550
69	Phạm Phước Hưng (VIE)	0.000

=== Final ===
Rank	Athlete	Score
1st place, gold medalist(s)	Zou Kai (CHN)	15.533
2nd place, silver medalist(s)	Huang Yuguo (CHN)	15.300
3rd place, bronze medalist(s)	Yuya Kamoto (JPN)	14.933
4	Shin Dong-hyen (KOR)	14.900
5	Shotaro Shirai (JPN)	14.800
6	Ri Se-gwang (PRK)	14.533
7	Yang Hak-seon (KOR)	14.100
8	Lee Chih-kai (TPE)	13.466
