= Gymnastics at the 2014 Asian Games – Men's artistic individual all-around =

Men's individual all-around at the 2014 Asian Games
- Venue: Namdong Gymnasium
- Date: 21–23 September 2014
- Competitors: 83 from 21 nations

Medalists
gold medal	Yuya Kamoto	Japan
silver medal	Masayoshi Yamamoto	Japan
bronze medal	Lee Sang-wook	South Korea

The men's artistic individual all-around competition at the 2014 Asian Games in Incheon, South Korea was held on 21 and 23 September 2014 at the Namdong Gymnasium.

== Schedule ==
All times are Korea Standard Time (UTC+09:00)

Date	Time	Event
Sunday, 21 September 2014	10:00	Qualification
Tuesday, 23 September 2014	14:30	Final

== Results ==
Legend

- DNS — Did not start

=== Qualification ===
Rank	Athlete	Floor (gymnastics)	Pommel horse	Rings (gymnastics)	Vault (gymnastics)	Parallel bars	Horizontal bar	Total
1	Yuya Kamoto (JPN)	14.975	13.900	14.750	14.700	15.925	14.600	88.850
2	Masayoshi Yamamoto (JPN)	14.350	14.800	14.600	14.900	14.450	14.850	87.950
3	Yusuke Saito (JPN)	14.425	14.450	14.650	14.700	14.850	14.850	87.925
4	Park Min-soo (KOR)	13.600	14.650	14.550	14.650	15.100	15.050	87.600
5	Huang Yuguo (CHN)	14.950	15.000	14.400	14.800	15.350	12.800	87.300
6	Huang Xi (CHN)	14.750	13.700	14.425	14.850	14.850	14.050	86.625
7	Yang Shengchao (CHN)	14.450	13.950	14.600	13.900	15.050	14.600	86.550
8	Lee Sang-wook (KOR)	14.425	13.925	14.100	14.450	15.050	13.875	85.825
9	Wang Peng (CHN)	14.700	12.900	14.350	14.350	14.150	13.625	84.075
10	Đinh Phương Thành (VIE)	14.050	14.000	12.500	14.450	15.500	13.550	84.050
11	Lee Chih-kai (TPE)	14.550	14.550	13.500	14.500	14.100	12.850	84.050
12	Stepan Gorbachev (KAZ)	14.450	13.750	13.050	14.600	13.850	13.850	83.550
13	Lê Thanh Tùng (VIE)	13.900	13.100	13.750	14.200	14.850	12.900	82.700
14	Han Jong-hyok (PRK)	13.550	12.550	14.450	13.450	15.050	13.600	82.650
15	Hsu Ping-chien (TPE)	13.500	14.300	13.550	13.800	13.900	12.400	81.450
16	Eduard Shaulov (UZB)	14.450	13.200	12.750	14.400	13.600	12.900	81.300
17	Lin Yi-chieh (TPE)	14.000	12.850	13.550	14.250	13.450	12.200	80.300
18	Ashish Kumar (IND)	14.450	12.300	13.200	14.350	13.400	12.550	80.250
19	Otabek Masharipov (UZB)	13.225	13.550	13.500	14.000	13.500	12.400	80.175
20	Mohammad Ramezanpour (IRI)	14.200	13.600	12.800	14.900	13.200	11.100	79.800
21	Saeid Reza Keikha (IRI)	13.850	14.800	13.850	13.400	12.350	11.400	79.650
22	Rakesh Kumar Patra (IND)	12.400	11.500	14.350	13.950	14.150	12.550	78.900
23	Gabriel Gan (SIN)	13.250	13.300	12.200	13.450	13.250	12.925	78.375
24	Ilya Kornev (KAZ)	11.750	11.250	13.750	13.650	14.000	13.850	78.250
25	Huang Ta-yu (TPE)	13.150	14.100	12.175	12.650	13.650	12.350	78.075
26	Mohammad Reza Hamidi (IRI)	13.375	13.350	12.550	13.500	13.500	11.700	77.975
27	Ra Won-chol (PRK)	11.950	12.950	14.375	12.350	14.050	12.050	77.725
28	Iman Khamoushi (IRI)	13.600	12.650	13.400	14.450	11.275	10.650	76.025
29	Salokhiddin Mirzaev (UZB)	12.150	10.925	13.900	14.300	12.250	12.325	75.850
30	Aditya Singh Rana (IND)	12.975	12.150	11.350	14.050	12.700	12.450	75.675
31	Nurbol Babylov (KAZ)	12.900	10.550	12.650	14.300	11.750	12.700	74.850
32	Abdullah Al-Boussi (KSA)	14.050	11.050	12.450	13.750	12.750	10.075	74.125
33	Aizat Jufrie (SIN)	11.600	10.200	12.800	14.000	12.750	11.950	73.300
34	Ahmed Al-Dyani (QAT)	13.400	13.100	12.975	13.700	12.000	7.900	73.075
35	Pürevdorjiin Otgonbat (MGL)	13.100	10.250	11.550	13.550	11.600	12.050	72.100
36	Mönkhtsogiin Ariunbulag (MGL)	12.700	9.550	10.850	13.450	11.400	11.100	69.050
37	Yousef Al-Sahhaf (KUW)	11.950	10.550	10.750	12.600	10.850	10.600	67.300
	Syque Caesar (BAN)	13.700				15.150	14.200	
	Liao Junlin (CHN)		13.500	15.450		13.450		
	Zou Kai (CHN)	15.350			14.500		15.350	
	Ng Kiu Chung (HKG)	13.050		14.100				
	Shek Wai Hung (HKG)				15.200		14.100	
	Dhan Bahadur (IND)		14.025			13.600		
	Chandan Pathak (IND)	13.600	11.950	12.450	12.300		11.500	
	Abhijit Ishwar Shinde (IND)	12.400		13.150	12.850	12.750	12.000	
	Hadi Khanarinejad (IRI)	13.400		15.050		13.200	12.250	
	Tomomasa Hasegawa (JPN)		15.500		14.450	12.550	13.650	
	Shotaro Shirai (JPN)	15.450	14.500	14.700	15.050			
	Kazuyuki Takeda (JPN)	14.900		15.150		14.700	13.150	
	Azizbek Kudratullayev (KAZ)			13.025		14.250	12.750	
	Maxim Petrishko (KAZ)	13.850	13.100		12.850	13.850		
	Kim Hee-hoon (KOR)	14.100	14.550	14.375	14.200			
	Lee Hyeok-jung (KOR)		13.650	14.075		14.950	14.225	
	Shin Dong-hyen (KOR)	14.950	15.200		14.900	15.050	13.200	
	Yang Hak-seon (KOR)	14.850		14.950	15.600	14.750	13.350	
	Abdulaziz Al-Johani (KSA)	11.550						
	Jaffar Al-Sayigh (KSA)	12.900			14.050	11.650		
	Ali Al-Kandari (KUW)	12.050		9.800	11.950			
	Ahmad Al-Qattan (KUW)		12.825					
	Ganbatyn Erdenebold (MGL)	13.900	12.350		14.150			
	Kabin Raj Shrestha (NEP)	9.050			11.500			
	Nishan Simkhada (NEP)	11.100			10.500			
	Muhammad Afzal (PAK)	10.150			12.800	10.750		
	Muhammad Yasir (PAK)	8.550			12.700	10.050		
	Reyland Capellan (PHI)	14.400			14.350			
	Kim Jin-hyok (PRK)		13.875	15.150		15.675	13.150	
	Kim Kwang-chun (PRK)	13.400	13.150		14.250	15.000	13.800	
	Ri Se-gwang (PRK)	15.200	13.350	14.600	15.600			
	Ryang Kuk-chol (PRK)	14.150		13.400	14.300	14.450	11.175	
	Malek Al-Yahri (QAT)		10.900					
	Hoe Wah Toon (SIN)	14.000			14.050			
	Terry Tay (SIN)	13.600		13.300	13.800			
	Rartchawat Kaewpanya (THA)		14.750			14.100		
	Bobby Kriangkum (THA)	14.050	10.750		14.350	11.950		
	Chen Chih-yu (TPE)	14.200	11.150	15.400	14.300			
	Tang Chia-hung (TPE)							
	Rasuljon Abdurakhimov (UZB)	11.850		12.650	14.300	13.750	12.450	
	Abdulla Azimov (UZB)		14.825					
	Anton Fokin (UZB)		12.250	14.450		15.550		
	Đặng Nam (VIE)	13.100	13.275	15.200	13.850			
	Đỗ Vũ Hưng (VIE)	14.300	12.800		13.500	13.900	11.950	
	Hoàng Cường (VIE)			13.475		14.200	12.600	
	Phạm Phước Hưng (VIE)	0.000	12.250	14.350		15.500	13.100	

=== Final ===
Rank	Athlete	Floor (gymnastics)	Pommel horse	Rings (gymnastics)	Vault (gymnastics)	Parallel bars	Horizontal bar	Total
1st place, gold medalist(s)	Yuya Kamoto (JPN)	15.000	13.400	14.900	14.750	15.500	14.400	87.950
2nd place, silver medalist(s)	Masayoshi Yamamoto (JPN)	14.100	14.900	14.600	14.850	14.600	14.450	87.500
3rd place, bronze medalist(s)	Lee Sang-wook (KOR)	14.850	14.150	14.200	14.400	14.850	14.750	87.200
4	Huang Yuguo (CHN)	14.850	13.700	14.600	14.450	15.450	13.450	86.500
5	Yang Shengchao (CHN)	13.650	13.100	14.650	13.350	14.375	14.800	83.925
6	Lee Chih-kai (TPE)	14.150	14.375	13.700	13.550	13.750	13.350	82.875
7	Ra Won-chol (PRK)	13.250	14.100	14.150	14.000	13.950	13.400	82.850
8	Lê Thanh Tùng (VIE)	14.350	12.850	13.950	14.400	14.400	12.650	82.600
9	Stepan Gorbachev (KAZ)	14.325	14.100	13.550	14.675	13.750	12.050	82.450
10	Park Min-soo (KOR)	14.100	14.600	14.200	13.400	13.650	12.350	82.300
11	Hsu Ping-chien (TPE)	13.700	13.600	13.700	14.150	13.900	13.150	82.200
12	Ashish Kumar (IND)	14.700	13.250	13.200	14.250	13.600	12.750	81.750
13	Han Jong-hyok (PRK)	13.300	12.150	13.500	13.350	14.500	14.900	81.700
14	Ilya Kornev (KAZ)	13.800	11.500	13.650	14.200	13.250	13.750	80.150
15	Otabek Masharipov (UZB)	14.000	12.550	13.550	13.050	13.250	13.400	79.800
16	Mohammad Ramezanpour (IRI)	14.150	12.700	13.025	13.550	12.550	12.600	78.575
17	Aditya Singh Rana (IND)	14.050	11.425	12.750	13.575	13.100	12.250	77.150
18	Gabriel Gan (SIN)	12.850	13.775	12.450	12.600	12.550	11.800	76.025
19	Ahmed Al-Dyani (QAT)	13.650	11.350	11.800	13.200	13.050	12.800	75.850
20	Abdullah Al-Boussi (KSA)	13.800	11.850	12.300	13.650	12.200	11.000	74.800
21	Aizat Jufrie (SIN)	12.900	9.800	12.700	14.250	12.250	12.250	74.150
22	Eduard Shaulov (UZB)	13.700	11.000	12.250	13.600	11.450	10.750	72.750
23	Pürevdorjiin Otgonbat (MGL)	13.100	10.350	11.450	13.450	11.450	10.775	70.575
—	Saeid Reza Keikha (IRI)							DNS
