= Gymnastics at the 2014 Asian Games – Men's parallel bars =

Men's parallel bars at the 2014 Asian Games
- Venue: Namdong Gymnasium
- Date: 21–25 September 2014
- Competitors: 62 from 18 nations

Medalists
gold medal	Yuya Kamoto	Japan
silver medal	Anton Fokin	Uzbekistan
bronze medal	Đinh Phương Thành	Vietnam

The men's parallel bars event, part of the gymnastics competition at the 2014 Asian Games in Incheon, South Korea was held between 21 and 25 September 2014 at the Namdong Gymnasium.

== Schedule ==
All times are Korea Standard Time (UTC+09:00)

Date	Time	Event
Sunday, 21 September 2014	10:00	Qualification
Thursday, 25 September 2014	20:35	Final

== Results ==
=== Qualification ===
Rank	Athlete	Score
1	Yuya Kamoto (JPN)	15.925
2	Kim Jin-hyok (PRK)	15.675
3	Anton Fokin (UZB)	15.550
4	Đinh Phương Thành (VIE)	15.500
5	Phạm Phước Hưng (VIE)	15.500
6	Huang Yuguo (CHN)	15.350
7	Syque Caesar (BAN)	15.150
8	Park Min-soo (KOR)	15.100
9	Yang Shengchao (CHN)	15.050
9	Shin Dong-hyen (KOR)	15.050
11	Lee Sang-wook (KOR)	15.050
12	Han Jong-hyok (PRK)	15.050
13	Kim Kwang-chun (PRK)	15.000
14	Lee Hyeok-jung (KOR)	14.950
15	Huang Xi (CHN)	14.850
16	Yusuke Saito (JPN)	14.850
17	Lê Thanh Tùng (VIE)	14.850
18	Yang Hak-seon (KOR)	14.750
19	Kazuyuki Takeda (JPN)	14.700
20	Ryang Kuk-chol (PRK)	14.450
21	Masayoshi Yamamoto (JPN)	14.450
22	Azizbek Kudratullayev (KAZ)	14.250
23	Hoàng Cường (VIE)	14.200
24	Rakesh Kumar Patra (IND)	14.150
25	Wang Peng (CHN)	14.150
26	Lee Chih-kai (TPE)	14.100
27	Rartchawat Kaewpanya (THA)	14.100
28	Ra Won-chol (PRK)	14.050
29	Ilya Kornev (KAZ)	14.000
30	Hsu Ping-chien (TPE)	13.900
31	Đỗ Vũ Hưng (VIE)	13.900
32	Maxim Petrishko (KAZ)	13.850
33	Stepan Gorbachev (KAZ)	13.850
34	Rasuljon Abdurakhimov (UZB)	13.750
35	Huang Ta-yu (TPE)	13.650
36	Eduard Shaulov (UZB)	13.600
37	Dhan Bahadur (IND)	13.600
38	Mohammad Reza Hamidi (IRI)	13.500
39	Otabek Masharipov (UZB)	13.500
40	Lin Yi-chieh (TPE)	13.450
41	Liao Junlin (CHN)	13.450
42	Ashish Kumar (IND)	13.400
43	Gabriel Gan (SIN)	13.250
44	Mohammad Ramezanpour (IRI)	13.200
45	Hadi Khanarinejad (IRI)	13.200
46	Aizat Jufrie (SIN)	12.750
47	Abdullah Al-Boussi (KSA)	12.750
48	Abhijit Ishwar Shinde (IND)	12.750
49	Aditya Singh Rana (IND)	12.700
50	Tomomasa Hasegawa (JPN)	12.550
51	Saeid Reza Keikha (IRI)	12.350
52	Salokhiddin Mirzaev (UZB)	12.250
53	Ahmed Al-Dyani (QAT)	12.000
54	Bobby Kriangkum (THA)	11.950
55	Nurbol Babylov (KAZ)	11.750
56	Jaffar Al-Sayigh (KSA)	11.650
57	Pürevdorjiin Otgonbat (MGL)	11.600
58	Mönkhtsogiin Ariunbulag (MGL)	11.400
59	Iman Khamoushi (IRI)	11.275
60	Yousef Al-Sahhaf (KUW)	10.850
61	Muhammad Afzal (PAK)	10.750
62	Muhammad Yasir (PAK)	10.050

=== Final ===
Rank	Athlete	Score
1st place, gold medalist(s)	Yuya Kamoto (JPN)	15.800
2nd place, silver medalist(s)	Anton Fokin (UZB)	15.475
3rd place, bronze medalist(s)	Đinh Phương Thành (VIE)	15.416
4	Phạm Phước Hưng (VIE)	15.333
5	Park Min-soo (KOR)	15.266
6	Kim Jin-hyok (PRK)	15.233
7	Syque Caesar (BAN)	14.866
8	Huang Yuguo (CHN)	13.900
