= Gymnastics at the 2014 Asian Games – Men's rings =

Men's rings at the 2014 Asian Games
- Venue: Namdong Gymnasium
- Date: 21–24 September 2014
- Competitors: 59 from 16 nations

Medalists
gold medal	Liao Junlin	China
silver medal	Kazuyuki Takeda	Japan
bronze medal	Đặng Nam	Vietnam

The men's rings competition at the 2014 Asian Games in Incheon, South Korea was held on 21 and 24 September 2014 at the Namdong Gymnasium.

== Schedule ==
All times are Korea Standard Time (UTC+09:00)

Date	Time	Event
Sunday, 21 September 2014	10:00	Qualification
Wednesday, 24 September 2014	22:05	Final

== Results ==
=== Qualification ===
Rank	Athlete	Score
1	Liao Junlin (CHN)	15.450
2	Chen Chih-yu (TPE)	15.400
3	Đặng Nam (VIE)	15.200
4	Kazuyuki Takeda (JPN)	15.150
5	Kim Jin-hyok (PRK)	15.150
6	Hadi Khanarinejad (IRI)	15.050
7	Yang Hak-seon (KOR)	14.950
8	Yuya Kamoto (JPN)	14.750
9	Shotaro Shirai (JPN)	14.700
10	Yusuke Saito (JPN)	14.650
11	Masayoshi Yamamoto (JPN)	14.600
12	Yang Shengchao (CHN)	14.600
12	Ri Se-gwang (PRK)	14.600
14	Park Min-soo (KOR)	14.550
15	Han Jong-hyok (PRK)	14.450
16	Anton Fokin (UZB)	14.450
17	Huang Xi (CHN)	14.425
18	Huang Yuguo (CHN)	14.400
19	Kim Hee-hoon (KOR)	14.375
20	Ra Won-chol (PRK)	14.375
21	Rakesh Kumar Patra (IND)	14.350
22	Phạm Phước Hưng (VIE)	14.350
23	Wang Peng (CHN)	14.350
24	Lee Sang-wook (KOR)	14.100
25	Ng Kiu Chung (HKG)	14.100
26	Lee Hyeok-jung (KOR)	14.075
27	Salokhiddin Mirzaev (UZB)	13.900
28	Saeid Reza Keikha (IRI)	13.850
29	Lê Thanh Tùng (VIE)	13.750
30	Ilya Kornev (KAZ)	13.750
31	Hsu Ping-chien (TPE)	13.550
32	Lin Yi-chieh (TPE)	13.550
33	Otabek Masharipov (UZB)	13.500
34	Lee Chih-kai (TPE)	13.500
35	Hoàng Cường (VIE)	13.475
36	Iman Khamoushi (IRI)	13.400
37	Ryang Kuk-chol (PRK)	13.400
38	Terry Tay (SIN)	13.300
39	Ashish Kumar (IND)	13.200
40	Abhijit Ishwar Shinde (IND)	13.150
41	Stepan Gorbachev (KAZ)	13.050
42	Azizbek Kudratullayev (KAZ)	13.025
43	Ahmed Al-Dyani (QAT)	12.975
44	Mohammad Ramezanpour (IRI)	12.800
45	Aizat Jufrie (SIN)	12.800
46	Eduard Shaulov (UZB)	12.750
47	Rasuljon Abdurakhimov (UZB)	12.650
48	Nurbol Babylov (KAZ)	12.650
49	Mohammad Reza Hamidi (IRI)	12.550
50	Đinh Phương Thành (VIE)	12.500
51	Abdullah Al-Boussi (KSA)	12.450
52	Chandan Pathak (IND)	12.450
53	Gabriel Gan (SIN)	12.200
54	Huang Ta-yu (TPE)	12.175
55	Pürevdorjiin Otgonbat (MGL)	11.550
56	Aditya Singh Rana (IND)	11.350
57	Mönkhtsogiin Ariunbulag (MGL)	10.850
58	Yousef Al-Sahhaf (KUW)	10.750
59	Ali Al-Kandari (KUW)	9.800

=== Final ===
Rank	Athlete	Score
1st place, gold medalist(s)	Liao Junlin (CHN)	15.566
2nd place, silver medalist(s)	Kazuyuki Takeda (JPN)	15.100
3rd place, bronze medalist(s)	Đặng Nam (VIE)	15.033
4	Yusuke Saito (JPN)	14.866
4	Kim Jin-hyok (PRK)	14.866
6	Chen Chih-yu (TPE)	14.833
7	Yang Hak-seon (KOR)	14.700
8	Hadi Khanarinejad (IRI)	13.633
