= Gymnastics at the 2014 Asian Games – Men's vault =

Men's vault at the 2014 Asian Games
- Venue: Namdong Gymnasium
- Date: 21–25 September 2014
- Competitors: 28 from 16 nations

Medalists
gold medal	Shek Wai Hung	Hong Kong
silver medal	Yang Hak-seon	South Korea
bronze medal	Huang Xi	China

The men's vault competition at the 2014 Asian Games in Incheon, South Korea was held on 21 and 25 September 2014 at the Namdong Gymnasium.

== Schedule ==
All times are Korea Standard Time (UTC+09:00)

Date	Time	Event
Sunday, 21 September 2014	10:00	Qualification
Thursday, 25 September 2014	19:00	Final

== Results ==
=== Qualification ===
Rank	Athlete	Vault 1	Vault 2	Total
1	Ri Se-gwang (PRK)	15.600	15.450	15.525
2	Yang Hak-seon (KOR)	15.600	15.400	15.500
3	Huang Xi (CHN)	14.850	15.050	14.950
4	Kim Hee-hoon (KOR)	14.200	15.400	14.800
5	Shotaro Shirai (JPN)	15.050	14.500	14.775
6	Shek Wai Hung (HKG)	15.200	14.300	14.750
7	Huang Yuguo (CHN)	14.800	14.500	14.650
8	Lee Chih-kai (TPE)	14.500	14.700	14.600
9	Yusuke Saito (JPN)	14.700	14.150	14.425
10	Mohammad Ramezanpour (IRI)	14.900	13.900	14.400
11	Iman Khamoushi (IRI)	14.450	14.150	14.300
12	Ganbatyn Erdenebold (MGL)	14.150	14.450	14.300
13	Đặng Nam (VIE)	13.850	14.550	14.200
14	Hoe Wah Toon (SIN)	14.050	14.350	14.200
15	Aditya Singh Rana (IND)	14.050	14.200	14.125
16	Salokhiddin Mirzaev (UZB)	14.300	13.750	14.025
17	Terry Tay (SIN)	13.800	14.250	14.025
18	Reyland Capellan (PHI)	14.350	13.600	13.975
19	Ashish Kumar (IND)	14.350	13.500	13.925
20	Lê Thanh Tùng (VIE)	14.200	13.650	13.925
21	Bobby Kriangkum (THA)	14.350	13.400	13.875
22	Aizat Jufrie (SIN)	14.000	13.650	13.825
23	Pürevdorjiin Otgonbat (MGL)	13.550	13.400	13.475
24	Đỗ Vũ Hưng (VIE)	13.500	13.000	13.250
25	Mönkhtsogiin Ariunbulag (MGL)	13.450	12.850	13.150
26	Muhammad Yasir (PAK)	12.700	11.900	12.300
27	Jaffar Al-Sayigh (KSA)	14.050	10.450	12.250
28	Muhammad Afzal (PAK)	12.800	10.950	11.875

=== Final ===
Rank	Athlete	Vault 1	Vault 2	Total
1st place, gold medalist(s)	Shek Wai Hung (HKG)	15.200	15.233	15.216
2nd place, silver medalist(s)	Yang Hak-seon (KOR)	15.000	15.400	15.200
3rd place, bronze medalist(s)	Huang Xi (CHN)	14.700	14.900	14.800
4	Ri Se-gwang (PRK)	14.166	15.433	14.799
5	Lee Chih-kai (TPE)	14.566	14.433	14.499
6	Kim Hee-hoon (KOR)	14.033	14.033	14.033
7	Shotaro Shirai (JPN)	13.641	13.733	13.687
8	Huang Yuguo (CHN)	12.666	13.600	13.133
