= Gymnastics at the 2010 Asian Games – Men's artistic team =

Men's team at the 2010 Asian Games
- Venue: Asian Games Town Gymnasium
- Date: 13 November 2010
- Competitors: 75 from 13 nations

Medalists
gold medal	China; Chen Yibing, Feng Zhe, Lü Bo, Teng Haibin, Yan Mingyong, Zhang Chenglong
silver medal	Japan; Ryosuke Baba, Ryotaka Deguchi, Shun Kuwahara, Hisashi Mizutori, Takuya Nakase, Kyoichi Watanabe
bronze medal	South Korea; Kim Hee-hoon, Kim Ji-hoon, Kim Soo-myun, Sin Seob, Yang Hak-seon, Yoo Won-chul

The men's artistic team competition at the 2010 Asian Games in Guangzhou, China was held on 13 November 2010 at the Asian Games Town Gymnasium.

== Schedule ==
All times are China Standard Time (UTC+08:00)

Date	Time	Event
Saturday, 13 November 2010	09:30	Final

== Results ==
Legend

- DNS — Did not start

Rank	Team	Floor (gymnastics)	Pommel horse	Rings (gymnastics)	Vault (gymnastics)	Parallel bars	Horizontal bar	Total
1st place, gold medalist(s)	China (CHN)	59.700	58.200	62.300	64.450	61.900	61.950	368.500
	Chen Yibing	~~0.000~~	13.700	16.200	16.100		~~14.200~~	
	Feng Zhe	14.900			16.400	15.950	15.400	
	Lü Bo	14.750	~~13.650~~	15.400	15.900	15.250	15.000	
	Teng Haibin	14.700	15.550	14.750	~~15.800~~	15.500	15.450	
	Yan Mingyong		14.500	15.950		~~15.100~~		
	Zhang Chenglong	15.350	14.450		16.050	15.200	16.100	
2nd place, silver medalist(s)	Japan (JPN)	58.050	55.600	60.000	62.650	59.800	61.400	357.500
	Ryosuke Baba		~~11.250~~	~~14.500~~	15.800		14.750	
	Ryotaka Deguchi	14.400	14.950			14.550		
	Shun Kuwahara	14.400		14.650	15.500	15.450	15.700	
	Hisashi Mizutori	14.550	14.000	15.350	15.850	14.750	15.750	
	Takuya Nakase	~~13.650~~	14.050	15.050	~~15.300~~	~~14.450~~	~~14.700~~	
	Kyoichi Watanabe	14.700	12.600	14.950	15.500	15.050	15.200	
3rd place, bronze medalist(s)	South Korea (KOR)	58.650	56.300	58.500	63.950	58.100	57.450	352.950
	Kim Hee-hoon	14.300	14.550	14.200	16.050		~~11.750~~	
	Kim Ji-hoon	14.450	14.500		~~15.600~~	14.350	15.900	
	Kim Soo-myun	15.250	13.750	~~13.450~~	15.750	14.450	15.100	
	Sin Seob		13.500	14.750		14.000	13.000	
	Yang Hak-seon	~~14.050~~		14.050	16.400	~~13.550~~		
	Yoo Won-chul	14.650	~~13.050~~	15.500	15.750	15.300	13.450	
4	Kazakhstan (KAZ)	56.250	54.400	58.100	63.350	56.550	55.050	343.700
	Stepan Gorbachev	14.250	~~13.050~~	14.000	15.750	14.500	14.450	
	Timur Kurbanbayev			15.250	14.800		11.900	
	Maxim Petrishko	13.900	13.600			~~12.300~~		
	Ildar Valeyev		13.750	14.750		15.400	14.400	
	Stanislav Valiyev	14.000	13.200	14.100	16.400	12.700		
	Yernar Yerimbetov	14.100	13.850	~~13.450~~	16.400	13.950	14.300	
5	Uzbekistan (UZB)	56.250	54.550	53.850	60.050	56.550	55.100	336.350
	Anton Fokin	14.100	14.500	14.700	15.500	15.500	14.600	
	Otabek Masharipov	14.350	~~11.950~~	13.350		13.550	13.400	
	Daulet Narmetov	~~13.350~~	14.250	12.800	~~14.450~~			
	Ivan Olushev	13.650	12.500	~~12.250~~	15.000	13.250	~~11.900~~	
	Ravshanbek Osimov			13.000	14.600	14.250	13.650	
	Eduard Shaulov	14.150	13.300		14.950	~~13.050~~	13.450	
6	Vietnam (VIE)	56.800	50.650	53.400	61.350	58.400	53.250	333.850
	Đặng Nam	14.200	12.000	13.200	15.900	13.750	~~12.700~~	
	Hầu Trung Linh		~~9.750~~	12.300	14.700			
	Hoàng Cường	14.200	11.800		15.400	14.550	13.450	
	Nguyễn Hà Thanh	14.300			15.350	14.850	12.950	
	Phạm Phước Hưng	14.100	13.200	14.650		15.250	13.650	
	Trương Minh Sang	~~13.300~~	13.650	13.250	~~13.900~~	~~12.800~~	13.200	
7	Chinese Taipei (TPE)	53.600	53.300	56.600	59.850	53.800	52.650	329.800
	Chen Chih-yu	14.250	~~11.500~~	15.750	14.250	13.450	12.900	
	Hsu Ping-chien		14.150	13.700		13.950	13.800	
	Huang Che-kuei		14.600		14.700	13.650	12.650	
	Huang Hsien	12.500		13.900	15.450			
	Lu Yan-ting	13.200	11.600	13.250	~~14.050~~	~~11.950~~	13.300	
	Tu Yu-chen	13.650	12.950	~~12.800~~	15.450	12.750	~~11.800~~	
8	Iran (IRI)	55.600	50.400	56.700	60.450	53.900	51.550	328.600
	Amir Azami	13.400	11.400	14.300	~~14.350~~	13.100	~~11.900~~	
	Vahid Izadfar		13.000	13.400	15.250			
	Hadi Khanarinejad	14.100	12.700	15.350	14.650	~~12.750~~	12.350	
	Ehsan Khodadadi	13.750		13.650	14.600	13.550	13.400	
	Mohammad Ramezanpour	14.350	13.300	~~13.200~~	15.950	13.350	12.900	
	Younes Zeighami	~~12.050~~	~~10.650~~			13.900	12.900	
9	Thailand (THA)	53.500	50.600	54.350	61.650	54.250	51.700	326.050
	Suriyen Chanduang	12.450		14.600	~~14.150~~	~~11.600~~	~~11.150~~	
	Weena Chokpaoumpai	13.900	12.300	~~12.750~~	15.650	13.850	13.050	
	Rartchawat Kaewpanya	~~12.250~~	11.450	13.400	15.750	13.450	13.550	
	Woranad Kaewpanya	13.850	12.700		15.650		11.400	
	Thitipong Sukdee		14.150	13.050		13.050		
	Kittipong Yudee	13.300	~~11.100~~	13.300	14.600	13.900	13.700	
10	India (IND)	54.050	49.300	52.050	60.900	49.200	49.850	315.350
	Ashish Kumar	14.750	11.800	13.300	16.100	11.800	12.900	
	Devesh Kumar	13.450				13.050		
	Shinoj Muliyil	~~11.300~~	~~11.100~~	~~12.300~~	~~14.550~~	12.050	11.700	
	Rakesh Kumar Patra	13.000	12.450	13.500	14.600		12.750	
	Alok Ranjan	12.850	12.350	12.600	15.000	~~11.250~~	~~11.650~~	
	Mayank Srivastava		12.700	12.650	15.200	12.300	12.500	
11	Saudi Arabia (KSA)	49.050	36.000	39.400	55.900	45.950	25.850	252.150
	Abdulaziz Al-Johani	13.150	9.150	10.600	13.750	11.350	9.350	
	Ali Al-Khwaher	11.550	6.000	9.700	14.050	11.050	5.550	
	Habib Al-Swailah		12.100	9.250		11.300	9.100	
	Jasem Gazwi	12.300	8.750	9.850	13.650	~~11.000~~	1.850	
	Ismail Shabi	12.050	~~5.050~~		14.450	12.250		
12	Nepal (NEP)	26.150			35.800			61.950
	Ajar Jangam	11.000			11.500			
	Nirajan Kunwar	8.900			12.150			
	Pasang Kaji Sherpa							
	Surah Bahadur Singh	6.250			12.150			
—	Athletes from Kuwait (IOC)							DNS
	Jawad Al-Herz							
	Mohammad Al-Omran							
	Naser Al-Othman							
	Bader Al-Rashed							
	Ali Al-Saffar							
	Abdullah Karam							
