= Boxing at the 2014 Asian Games – Men's +91 kg =

Boxing competitions

Men's +91 kg at the 2014 Asian Games
- Venue: Seonhak Gymnasium
- Date: 26 September – 3 October 2014
- Competitors: 9 from 9 nations

Medalists
| gold medal | Ivan Dychko | Kazakhstan |
| silver medal | Jasem Delavari | Iran |
| bronze medal | Satish Kumar | India |
| bronze medal | Mirzohid Abdullaev | Uzbekistan |

The men's super heavyweight (+91 kilograms) event at the 2014 Asian Games took place from 26 September to 3 October 2014 at Seonhak Gymnasium, Incheon, South Korea.

Like all Asian Games boxing events, the competition was a straight single-elimination tournament. All bouts consisted of three three-minute rounds.

A total of 9 men from 9 countries competed in this event, super heavyweight division, limited to fighters whose body weight was more than 91 kilograms.

Ivan Dychko of Kazakhstan won the gold medal after beating Jasem Delavari from Iran in the final bout.

== Schedule ==
All times are Korea Standard Time (UTC+09:00)

| Date | Time | Event |
|---|---|---|
| Friday, 26 September 2014 | 19:00 | Preliminaries |
| Tuesday, 30 September 2014 | 14:00 | Quarterfinals |
| Thursday, 2 October 2014 | 14:00 | Semifinals |
| Friday, 3 October 2014 | 14:00 | Final |

== Results ==
Legend

- KO — Won by knockout

Preliminaries
Gu Guangming (CHN) | 0
Jasem Delavari (IRI) | 3

Quarterfinals
Satish Kumar (IND) | 2
Hussein Ishaish (JOR) | 1
Batmönkhiin Enkhbayar (MGL)
Ivan Dychko (KAZ) | KO
Mirzohid Abdullaev (UZB) | 3
Mohammad Ghossoun (SYR) | 0
Kim Do-hyeon (KOR) | 1
Jasem Delavari (IRI) | 2

Semifinals
Satish Kumar (IND) | 0
Ivan Dychko (KAZ) | 3
Mirzohid Abdullaev (UZB) | 1
Jasem Delavari (IRI) | 2

Final
Ivan Dychko (KAZ) | 3
Jasem Delavari (IRI) | 0
