= Iran at the 2014 Asian Games =

- IOC code: IRI
- NOC: National Olympic Committee of the Islamic Republic of Iran

in Incheon
- Competitors: 275 in 24 sports
- Flag bearer: Behdad Salimi
- Medals Ranked 5th: Gold 21 Silver 18 Bronze 18 Total 57

Asian Games appearances (overview)
- 1951; 1954; 1958; 1962; 1966; 1970; 1974; 1978; 1982; 1986; 1990; 1994; 1998; 2002; 2006; 2010; 2014; 2018; 2022; 2026

Iran participated in the 2014 Asian Games in Incheon, South Korea.

== Competitors ==
Sport	Men	Women	Total
Archery	4	4	8
Athletics	17	3	20
Badminton	1	1	2
Basketball	12		12
Boxing	6		6
Canoe slalom	2	2	4
Canoe sprint	11	3	14
Cycling mountain bike	2		2
Cycling road	3		3
Cycling track	9		9
Fencing	8		8
Football	20		20
Gymnastics artistic	5		5
Handball	16		16
Judo	5		5
Kabaddi	12	12	24
Karate	4	4	8
Rowing	17	6	23
Sailing	1		1
Shooting	11	12	23
Swimming	5		5
Table tennis	2	1	3
Taekwondo	6	5	11
Volleyball	12		12
Weightlifting	7		7
Wrestling	14		14
Wushu	6	4	10
Total	218	57	275

== Medal summary ==
=== Medals by sport ===
Sport	Gold	Silver	Bronze	Total
Archery	1		1	2
Athletics	1	1		2
Basketball		1		1
Boxing		2	1	3
Canoe slalom			1	1
Canoe sprint		2	2	4
Cycling road		1	1	2
Cycling track	1			1
Fencing		1		1
Kabaddi		2		2
Karate	3		2	5
Rowing	1		3	4
Shooting	1	2		3
Taekwondo	4	2	1	7
Volleyball	1			1
Weightlifting	1	1		2
Wrestling	6	1	5	12
Wushu	1	2	1	4
Total	21	18	18	57

=== Medalists ===
Medal	Name	Sport	Event
Gold	Esmaeil Ebadi	Archery	Men's individual compound
Gold	Ehsan Haddadi	Athletics	Men's discus throw
Gold	Mohammad Daneshvar	Cycling track	Men's keirin
Gold	Amir Mehdizadeh	Karate	Men's kumite 60 kg
Gold	Saeid Hassanipour	Karate	Men's kumite 75 kg
Gold	Hamideh Abbasali	Karate	Women's kumite +68 kg
Gold	Mohsen Shadi	Rowing	Men's single sculls
Gold	Najmeh Khedmati	Shooting	Women's 10 m air rifle
Gold	Farzan Ashourzadeh	Taekwondo	Men's 58 kg
Gold	Behnam Asbaghi	Taekwondo	Men's 68 kg
Gold	Masoud Hajji-Zavareh	Taekwondo	Men's 74 kg
Gold	Mehdi Khodabakhshi	Taekwondo	Men's 80 kg
Gold	Shahram Mahmoudi; Milad Ebadipour; Saeid Marouf; Farhad Ghaemi; Mohammad Mousavi; Pouria Fayazi; Farhad Zarif; Adel Gholami; Amir Ghafour; Mojtaba Mirzajanpour; Mehdi Mahdavi; Armin Tashakkori	Volleyball	Men
Gold	Behdad Salimi	Weightlifting	Men's +105 kg
Gold	Masoud Esmaeilpour	Wrestling	Men's freestyle 61 kg
Gold	Meisam Mostafa-Jokar	Wrestling	Men's freestyle 86 kg
Gold	Reza Yazdani	Wrestling	Men's freestyle 97 kg
Gold	Parviz Hadi	Wrestling	Men's freestyle 125 kg
Gold	Habibollah Akhlaghi	Wrestling	Men's Greco-Roman 80 kg
Gold	Mehdi Aliyari	Wrestling	Men's Greco-Roman 98 kg
Gold	Mohsen Mohammadseifi	Wushu	Men's sanda 65 kg
Silver	Leila Rajabi	Athletics	Women's shot put
Silver	Rouzbeh Arghavan; Sajjad Mashayekhi; Behnam Yakhchali; Mehdi Kamrani; Arman Zangeneh; Farid Aslani; Hamed Afagh; Oshin Sahakian; Asghar Kardoust; Mohammad Jamshidi; Samad Nikkhah Bahrami; Hamed Haddadi	Basketball	Men
Silver	Ali Mazaheri	Boxing	Men's 91 kg
Silver	Jasem Delavari	Boxing	Men's +91 kg
Silver	Ahmad Reza Talebian	Canoe sprint	Men's K1 1000 m
Silver	Ali Aghamirzaei; Saeid Fazloula	Canoe sprint	Men's K2 1000 m
Silver	Arvin Moazzami	Cycling road	Men's road race
Silver	Mojtaba Abedini; Farzad Baher; Ali Pakdaman; Mohammad Rahbari	Fencing	Men's team sabre
Silver	Fazel Atrachali; Meraj Sheikh; Mehdi Mousavi; Hadi Oshtorak; Gholam Abbas Korouki; Farhad Rahimi; Mohammad Maghsoudloo; Meisam Abbasi; Hadi Tajik; Reza Kamali Moghaddam; Abolfazl Maghsoudloo; Meisam Ghajar	Kabaddi	Men
Silver	Salimeh Abdollahbakhsh; Zahra Masoumabadi; Marzieh Eshghi; Maliheh Miri; Sedigheh Jafari; Ghazal Khalaj; Farideh Zarifdoust; Mojgan Zare; Hengameh Bourghani; Sahar Ilat; Saeideh Jafari; Tahereh Tirgar	Kabaddi	Women
Silver	Narjes Emamgholinejad	Shooting	Women's 10 m air rifle
Silver	Elaheh Ahmadi; Narjes Emamgholinejad; Najmeh Khedmati	Shooting	Women's 10 m air rifle team
Silver	Fatemeh Rouhani	Taekwondo	Women's 73 kg
Silver	Akram Khodabandeh	Taekwondo	Women's +73 kg
Silver	Kianoush Rostami	Weightlifting	Men's 85 kg
Silver	Ezzatollah Akbari	Wrestling	Men's freestyle 74 kg
Silver	Hamid Reza Ladvar	Wushu	Men's sanda 75 kg
Silver	Elaheh Mansourian	Wushu	Women's sanda 52 kg
Bronze	Esmaeil Ebadi; Majid Gheidi; Amir Kazempour	Archery	Men's team compound
Bronze	Ehsan Rouzbahani	Boxing	Men's 81 kg
Bronze	Sonia Gomari	Canoe slalom	Women's C1
Bronze	Adel Mojallali	Canoe sprint	Men's C1 200 m
Bronze	Arezoo Hakimi	Canoe sprint	Women's K1 200 m
Bronze	Hossein Askari	Cycling road	Men's individual time trial
Bronze	Fatemeh Chalaki	Karate	Women's kumite 61 kg
Bronze	Nasrin Dousti	Karate	Women's kumite 50 kg
Bronze	Mojtaba Shojaei; Amir Rahnama	Rowing	Men's double sculls
Bronze	Soulmaz Abbasi	Rowing	Women's lightweight single sculls
Bronze	Homeira Barzegar; Nazanin Malaei; Mahsa Javer; Soulmaz Abbasi	Rowing	Women's lightweight quadruple sculls
Bronze	Sousan Hajipour	Taekwondo	Women's 53 kg
Bronze	Afshin Biabangard	Wrestling	Men's Greco-Roman 66 kg
Bronze	Saeid Abdevali	Wrestling	Men's Greco-Roman 71 kg
Bronze	Payam Boveiri	Wrestling	Men's Greco-Roman 75 kg
Bronze	Mojtaba Karimfar	Wrestling	Men's Greco-Roman 85 kg
Bronze	Bashir Babajanzadeh	Wrestling	Men's Greco-Roman 130 kg
Bronze	Sajjad Abbasi	Wushu	Men's sanda 70 kg

== Results by event ==
=== Aquatics ===
==== Swimming ====
Athlete	Event	Heats		Final	
Athlete	Event	Time	Rank	Time	Rank
Ahmad Reza Jalali	Men's 50 m freestyle	23.74	17	Did not advance	
Arsham Mirzaei	Men's 50 m freestyle	23.91	19	Did not advance	
Ahmad Reza Jalali	Men's 100 m freestyle	52.69	20	Did not advance	
Arsham Mirzaei	Men's 100 m freestyle	53.14	24	Did not advance	
Jamal Chavoshifar	Men's 50 m backstroke	26.77	14	Did not advance	
Jamal Chavoshifar	Men's 100 m backstroke	58.23	19	Did not advance	
Mehdi Ansari	Men's 50 m breaststroke	DNS	—	Did not advance	
Aria Nasimi Shad	Men's 50 m breaststroke	31.06	19	Did not advance	
Aria Nasimi Shad	Men's 100 m breaststroke	1:06.02	24	Did not advance	
Mehdi Ansari	Men's 200 m breaststroke	2:23.12	19	Did not advance	
Aria Nasimi Shad	Men's 200 m breaststroke	2:20.02	17	Did not advance	
Mehdi Ansari	Men's 50 m butterfly	25.86	16	Did not advance	
Mehdi Ansari	Men's 100 m butterfly	57.18	19	Did not advance	
Mehdi Ansari; Arsham Mirzaei; Jamal Chavoshifar; Ahmad Reza Jalali	Men's 4 × 100 m freestyle relay	3:29.65	9	Did not advance	
Jamal Chavoshifar; Aria Nasimi Shad; Ahmad Reza Jalali; Arsham Mirzaei	Men's 4 × 100 m medley relay	3:52.25	10	Did not advance	

=== Archery ===
Compound

Athlete	Event	Ranking round		Round of 64	Round of 32	Round of 16	Quarterfinal	Semifinal	Final	Rank
Athlete	Event	Score	Rank	Round of 64	Round of 32	Round of 16	Quarterfinal	Semifinal	Final	Rank
Esmaeil Ebadi	Men's individual	710	1 Q	Bye	Vanlivong (LAO); W 148–135	Ibrahim (IRQ); W 149–142	Min (KOR); W 149–145	Dela Cruz (PHI); W 146–140	Verma (IND); W 145–141	1st place, gold medalist(s)
Majid Gheidi	Men's individual	691	15	Did not advance						38
Amir Kazempour	Men's individual	702	3 Q	Bye	Shein (MYA); W 142–138	Nguyễn (VIE); W 144–139	Mahazan (MAS); L 140–140 (9–10 SO)	Did not advance		7
Majid Kianzad	Men's individual	689	18	Did not advance						39
Esmaeil Ebadi; Majid Gheidi; Amir Kazempour; Majid Kianzad	Men's team	2103	2 Q	—N/a		Bye	Vietnam; W 231–227	India; L 227–231	3rd place match Philippines; W 227–224	3rd place, bronze medalist(s)
Minoo Abedi	Women's individual	658	31	—N/a	Did not advance					35
Sakineh Ghasempour	Women's individual	682	7 Q	—N/a	Bye	Sarlak (IRI); L 138–140	Did not advance			9
Maryam Ranjbar	Women's individual	674	19	—N/a	Did not advance					29
Shabnam Sarlak	Women's individual	680	13 Q	—N/a	Batdulam (MGL); W 127–125	Ghasempour (IRI); W 140–138	Deb (IND); L 131–142	Did not advance		8
Sakineh Ghasempour; Maryam Ranjbar; Shabnam Sarlak; Minoo Abedi	Women's team	2036	4 Q	—N/a		Bye	Indonesia; W 227–222	South Korea; L 222–229	3rd place match India; L 217–224	4

=== Athletics ===
Track & Field

Athlete	Event	Round 1		Semifinal		Final	Rank
Athlete	Event	Time	Rank	Time	Rank	Time / Result	Rank
Reza Ghasemi	Men's 100 m	10.33	3 Q	10.30	4 q	10.25	5
Hassan Taftian	Men's 100 m	10.41	3 Q	10.34	4	Did not advance	9
Mohammad Hossein Abareghi	Men's 200 m	20.89	3 Q	21.33	3 q	21.07	6
Hassan Taftian	Men's 200 m	21.39	2 Q	21.49	2 Q	21.24	8
Sajjad Moradi	Men's 800 m	DNS	—	—N/a		Did not advance	—
Mehdi Rahimi; Mehdi Zamani; Ehsan Tahmasebi; Sajjad Hashemi	Men's 4 × 400 m relay	DNF	—	—N/a		Did not advance	—
Keivan Ghanbarzadeh	Men's high jump	—N/a				No mark	—
Mohammad Reza Vazifehdoust	Men's high jump	—N/a				2.20 m	6
Mohammad Arzandeh	Men's long jump	—N/a				7.56 m	6
Amin Nikfar	Men's shot put	—N/a				19.02 m	4
Ehsan Haddadi	Men's discus throw	—N/a				65.11 m	1st place, gold medalist(s)
Mohammad Samimi	Men's discus throw	—N/a				60.37 m	4
Reza Moghaddam	Men's hammer throw	—N/a				No mark	—
Kaveh Mousavi	Men's hammer throw	—N/a				No mark	—
Maryam Tousi	Women's 100 m	11.70	3 q	—N/a		11.73	7
Maryam Tousi	Women's 200 m	23.66	2 Q	—N/a		23.64	5
Leila Rajabi	Women's shot put	—N/a				17.80 m	2nd place, silver medalist(s)

Combined

Athlete	Event	100m	LJ	SP	HJ	400m	110mH	DT	PV	JT	1500m	Total	Rank
Hadi Sepehrzad	Men's decathlon	11.14; 830	6.75 m 755	15.78 m 838	1.90 m 714	50.85; 776	14.95; 856	50.88 m 889	4.40 m 731	54.35 m 653	5:05.30; 530	7572	5
Athlete	Event	100mH	HJ	SP	200m	LJ	JT	800m	—N/a			Total	Rank
Sepideh Tavakkoli	Women's heptathlon	14.87; 859	1.83 m 1016	12.62 m 702	26.50; 754	4.04 m 317	39.32 m 654	2:25.48; 751	—N/a			5053	6

=== Badminton ===
Athlete	Event	Round of 64	Round of 32	Round of 16	Quarterfinal	Semifinal	Final	Rank
Soroush Eskandari	Men's singles	Bye	Son (KOR); L 0–2 (8–21, 10–21)	Did not advance				17
Sorayya Aghaei	Women's singles	—N/a	Khulangoo (MGL); W 2–0 (21–3, 21–5)	Nehwal (IND); L 0–2 (7–21, 6–21)	Did not advance			9

=== Basketball ===
Team	Event	Qualification round	Preliminary round			Second round				Semifinal	Final	Rank
Team	Event	Qualification round	Round 1	Round 2	Rank	Round 1	Round 2	Round 3	Rank	Semifinal	Final	Rank
Iran	Men	Bye	India; W 76–41	Philippines; W 68–63	1 Q	Japan; W 82–59	Mongolia; W 107–69	China; W 75–67	1 Q	Kazakhstan; W 80–78	South Korea; L 77–79	2nd place, silver medalist(s)
Roster: Rouzbeh Arghavan; Sajjad Mashayekhi; Behnam Yakhchali; Mehdi Kamrani; Arman Zangeneh; Farid Aslani; Hamed Afagh; Oshin Sahakian; Asghar Kardoust; Mohammad Jamshidi; Samad Nikkhah Bahrami; Hamed Haddadi; Coach: (Slovenia) Memi Bečirovič

=== Boxing ===
Athlete	Event	Round of 32	Round of 16	Quarterfinal	Semifinal	Final	Rank
Foroutan Golara	Men's 60 kg	Adi (THA); L 1–2	Did not advance				17
Amin Ghasemipour	Men's 69 kg	Bye	Faqihi (KSA); W 3–0	Hudaýberdiýew (TKM); L 0–3	Did not advance		5
Sajjad Mehrabi	Men's 75 kg	Bye	Irshaid (PLE); W 3–0	Alimkhanuly (KAZ); L 0–3	Did not advance		5
Ehsan Rouzbahani	Men's 81 kg	—N/a	Norbu (BHU); W 3–0	Singh (IND); W 3–0	Niyazymbetov (KAZ); L 1–2	Did not advance	3rd place, bronze medalist(s)
Ali Mazaheri	Men's 91 kg	—N/a	Bye	Otgonbayar (MGL); W 3–0	Al-Matbouli (JOR); W 3–0	Pinchuk (KAZ); L 0–3	2nd place, silver medalist(s)
Jasem Delavari	Men's +91 kg	—N/a	Gu (CHN); W 3–0	Kim (KOR); W 2–1	Abdullaev (UZB); W 2–1	Dychko (KAZ); L 0–3	2nd place, silver medalist(s)

=== Canoeing ===
==== Slalom ====
Athlete	Event	Heats		Repechage		Last 16		Quarterfinal	Semifinal	Final	Rank
Athlete	Event	Time	Rank	Time	Rank	Time	Rank	Quarterfinal	Semifinal	Final	Rank
Amir Mohammad Fattahpour	Men's C1	1:15.13	5 Q	—N/a		DSQ	—	Did not advance			—
Mohammad Sedigh Heshmatian	Men's K1	1:05.55	6 Q	Bye		1:07.07	8 Q	Husslein (THA); L 1:07.45–1:06.47	Did not advance		6
Sonia Gomari	Women's C1	1:28.23	5	1:26.64	1 Q	—N/a		Yazawa (JPN); W 1:28.94–1:32.95	Cen (CHN); L 1:28.24–1:23.55	3rd place match Pornchai (THA); W 1:27.36–1:28.78	3rd place, bronze medalist(s)
Shaghayegh Seyed-Yousefi	Women's K1	1:14.29	6	1:13.99	1 Q	—N/a		Li (CHN); L 1:10.77–1:16.32, QLL	Chang (TPE); L 1:12.28–1:15.75	3rd place match Yazawa (JPN); L 1:14.36–1:16.44	4

==== Sprint ====
Athlete	Event	Heat		Semifinal		Final	Rank
Athlete	Event	Time	Rank	Time	Rank	Time	Rank
Adel Mojallali	Men's C1 200 m	38.173	1 QF	Bye		39.669	3rd place, bronze medalist(s)
Shahoo Nasseri	Men's C1 1000 m	4:21.609	3 QF	Bye		4:12.857	5
Pejman Divsalari; Kia Eskandani	Men's C2 1000 m	4:02.478	2 QF	Bye		4:09.020	7
Alireza Alimohammadi	Men's K1 200 m	35.341	3 QF	Bye		36.809	4
Ahmad Reza Talebian	Men's K1 1000 m	4:01.819	3 QF	Bye		3:44.155	2nd place, silver medalist(s)
Saeid Fazloula; Alireza Alimohammadi	Men's K2 200 m	32.454	5 QS	33.685	1 Q	33.306	6
Ali Aghamirzaei; Saeid Fazloula	Men's K2 1000 m	3:25.631	1 QF	Bye		3:23.590	2nd place, silver medalist(s)
Ahmad Reza Talebian; Hamid Reza Torki; Farzin Asadi; Amin Boudaghi	Men's K4 1000 m	3:07.105	1 QF	Bye		3:06.077	4
Arezoo Hakimi	Women's K1 200 m	41.566	3 QF	Bye		41.807	3rd place, bronze medalist(s)
Arezoo Hakimi	Women's K1 500 m	1:58.803	3 QF	Bye		1:55.122	4
Mina Abdollahi; Hedieh Kazemi	Women's K2 500 m	1:49.723	3 QF	Bye		1:52.870	8

=== Cycling ===
==== Mountain bike ====
Athlete	Event	Time	Rank
Parviz Mardani	Men's cross-country	1:52:35	10
Faraz Shokri	Men's cross-country	1:52:12	9

==== Road ====
Athlete	Event	Time	Rank
Arvin Moazzami	Men's road race	4:07:52	2nd place, silver medalist(s)
Mehdi Sohrabi	Men's road race	4:14:29	18
Hossein Askari	Men's individual time trial	51:19.77	3rd place, bronze medalist(s)

==== Track ====
Sprint

Athlete	Event	Qualifying		Round of 32	Round of 32 Repechage	Round of 16	Round of 16 Repechage	Quarterfinal	Semifinal	Final	Rank
Athlete	Event	Time	Rank	Round of 32	Round of 32 Repechage	Round of 16	Round of 16 Repechage	Quarterfinal	Semifinal	Final	Rank
Mohammad Daneshvar	Men's sprint	10.175	7 Q	Law (HKG); W 1–0	Bye	Xu (CHN); L 0–1	Rank 2	Did not advance		9th–12th places Rank 3	11
Hassan Ali Varposhti	Men's sprint	10.386	10 Q	Choi (KOR); W 1–0	Bye	Im (KOR); W 1–0	Bye	Bao (CHN); L 0–2	Did not advance	5th–8th places Rank 2	6

Keirin

Athlete	Event	Round 1	Repechage	Round 2	Final	Rank
Athlete	Event	Rank	Rank	Rank	Rank	Rank
Mohammad Daneshvar	Men's keirin	2 Q	Bye	3 QA	1	1st place, gold medalist(s)
Mahmoud Parash	Men's keirin	5	3 Q	5 QB	Final B 4	10

Endurance

Athlete	Event	Scratch race		Individual pursuit		Elimination race		1km time trial		Flying lap		Points race		Total	Rank
Athlete	Event	Rank	Points	Rank	Points	Rank	Points	Rank	Points	Rank	Points	Rank	Points	Total	Rank
Hossein Nateghi	Men's omnium	6	30	7	28	6	30	8	26	7	28	5	56	198	9

Team

Athlete	Event	Qualifying		Round 1		Final	Rank
Athlete	Event	Time	Rank	Time	Rank	Final	Rank
Farzin Arab; Hassan Ali Varposhti; Mahmoud Parash	Men's team sprint	1:01.814	4 QB	—N/a		3rd place match Japan; L 1:01.523–1:00.436	4
Ali Khademi; Hamid Beikkhormizi; Behnam Arian; Mohammad Rajabloo	Men's team pursuit	4:26.513	7 QB	Uzbekistan; L 4:26.282–4:20.759	7	7th place match United Arab Emirates; L 4:27.861–4:27.280	8

=== Fencing ===
Épée

Athlete	Event	Pool round		Round of 32	Round of 16	Quarterfinal	Semifinal	Final	Rank
Athlete	Event	Results	Rank	Round of 32	Round of 16	Quarterfinal	Semifinal	Final	Rank
Mohammad Rezaei	Men's individual	Kudayev (UZB) W 5–4; Samir (PLE) W 5–3; Zhang (CHN) W 5–3; Lim (SIN) W 5–0; Sakamoto (JPN) L 2–5; Malallah (KUW) W 5–0	6 Q	Malallah (KUW); W 15–8	Minobe (JPN); L 11–15	Did not advance			11
Ali Yaghoubian	Men's individual	Park (KOR) L 0–5; Ivanov (KGZ) L 3–5; Alexanin (KAZ) L 2–5; Al-Tairi (QAT) L 4–5; Nguyễn (VIE) L 1–5; Batkhüü (MGL) W 5–0	29	Did not advance					29
Sadegh Abedi; Taher Ashouri; Mohammad Rezaei; Ali Yaghoubian	Men's team	—N/a			Hong Kong; W 38–37	Japan; L 35–45	Did not advance		7

Sabre

Athlete	Event	Pool round		Round of 32	Round of 16	Quarterfinal	Semifinal	Final	Rank
Athlete	Event	Results	Rank	Round of 32	Round of 16	Quarterfinal	Semifinal	Final	Rank
Mojtaba Abedini	Men's individual	Lam (HKG) W 5–2; Tokunan (JPN) W 5–4; Haekerd (THA) W 5–2; Al-Siddiq (QAT) W 5–2; Al-Khaiyat (KUW) W 5–4	3 Q	Bye	Nguyễn (VIE); W 15–11	Gu (KOR); L 10–15	Did not advance		5
Ali Pakdaman	Men's individual	Sun (CHN) L 3–5; Low (HKG) W 5–1; Al-Neamah (KSA) W 5–2; Nguyễn (VIE) W 5–1; Barzegar (QAT) W 5–0	4 Q	Bye	Al-Shamlan (KUW); W 15–10	Lam (HKG); L 13–15	Did not advance		6
Mojtaba Abedini; Farzad Baher; Ali Pakdaman; Mohammad Rahbari	Men's team	—N/a			Bye	Vietnam; W 45–19	China; W 45–44	South Korea; L 26–45	2nd place, silver medalist(s)

=== Football ===
Team	Event	Preliminary round			Round of 16	Quarterfinal	Semifinal	Final	Rank
Team	Event	Round 1	Round 2	Rank	Round of 16	Quarterfinal	Semifinal	Final	Rank
Iran	Men	Vietnam; L 1–4	Kyrgyzstan; D 1–1	3	Did not advance				23
Roster: Hojjat Sedghi; Yousef Vakia; Shahriar Shirvand; Mohammad Daneshgar; Mohammad Reza Khanzadeh; Morteza Pouraliganji; Rouzbeh Cheshmi; Ali Karimi; Kaveh Rezaei; Mohsen Mosalman; Yaghoub Karimi; Mohammad Reza Akhbari; Hossein Kanaanizadegan; Mehdi Mehdipour; Farshid Esmaeili; Vahid Heidarieh; Mehdi Sharifi; Arash Rezavand; Ehsan Pahlavan; Mohammad Nasseri; Coach: (Portugal) Nelo Vingada

=== Gymnastics ===
==== Artistic ====
Men

Athlete	Event	Qualification		Final		Rank
Athlete	Event	Score	Rank	Score	Rank	Rank
Mohammad Reza Hamidi; Saeid Reza Keikha; Iman Khamoushi; Hadi Khanarinejad; Mohammad Ramezanpour	Team			319.500	8	8
Mohammad Reza Hamidi	Individual all-around	77.975	26	Did not advance		32
Mohammad Reza Hamidi	Floor	13.375	44	Did not advance		44
Mohammad Reza Hamidi	Pommel horse	13.350	27	Did not advance		27
Mohammad Reza Hamidi	Rings	12.550	49	Did not advance		49
Mohammad Reza Hamidi	Parallel bars	13.500	38	Did not advance		38
Mohammad Reza Hamidi	Horizontal bar	11.700	47	Did not advance		47
Saeid Reza Keikha	Individual all-around	79.650	21 Q	Did not start		—
Saeid Reza Keikha	Floor	13.850	33	Did not advance		33
Saeid Reza Keikha	Pommel horse	14.800	6 Q	13.566	8	8
Saeid Reza Keikha	Rings	13.850	28	Did not advance		28
Saeid Reza Keikha	Parallel bars	12.350	51	Did not advance		51
Saeid Reza Keikha	Horizontal bar	11.400	49	Did not advance		49
Iman Khamoushi	Individual all-around	76.025	28	Did not advance		33
Iman Khamoushi	Floor	13.600	36	Did not advance		36
Iman Khamoushi	Pommel horse	12.650	41	Did not advance		41
Iman Khamoushi	Rings	13.400	36	Did not advance		36
Iman Khamoushi	Vault	14.300	11	Did not advance		11
Iman Khamoushi	Parallel bars	11.275	59	Did not advance		59
Iman Khamoushi	Horizontal bar	10.650	53	Did not advance		53
Hadi Khanarinejad	Floor	13.400	41	Did not advance		41
Hadi Khanarinejad	Rings	15.050	6 Q	13.633	8	8
Hadi Khanarinejad	Parallel bars	13.200	45	Did not advance		45
Hadi Khanarinejad	Horizontal bar	12.250	40	Did not advance		40
Mohammad Ramezanpour	Individual all-around	79.800	20 Q	78.575	16	16
Mohammad Ramezanpour	Floor	14.200	22	Did not advance		22
Mohammad Ramezanpour	Pommel horse	13.600	24	Did not advance		24
Mohammad Ramezanpour	Rings	12.800	44	Did not advance		44
Mohammad Ramezanpour	Vault	14.400	10	Did not advance		10
Mohammad Ramezanpour	Parallel bars	13.200	44	Did not advance		44
Mohammad Ramezanpour	Horizontal bar	11.100	52	Did not advance		52

=== Handball ===
Team	Event	Preliminary round			Second round				Semifinal	Final	Rank
Team	Event	Round 1	Round 2	Rank	Round 1	Round 2	Round 3	Rank	Semifinal	Final	Rank
Iran	Men	Hong Kong; W 41–10	Kuwait; W 29–25	1 Q	Oman; L 25–26	South Korea; L 21–25	Saudi Arabia; W 26–21	2 Q	Qatar; L 21–29	3rd place match Bahrain; L 25–28	4
Roster: Abbas Asadzadeh; Iman Ehsannejad; Mohammad Reza Rajabi; Shahoo Nosrati; Pouya Norouzinejad; Alireza Mousavi; Saeid Pourghasemi; Mehdi Mousavi; Salaman Barbat; Mohsen Babasafari; Mojtaba Karamian; Ehsan Abouei; Amin Kazemi; Saeid Heidarirad; Mehrdad Samsami; Omid Sekenari; Coach: (Slovenia) Borut Maček

=== Judo ===
Athlete	Event	Round of 32	Round of 16	Quarterfinal	Semifinal	Final	Rank
Ehsan Bahramian	Men's 60 kg	Meretgeldiýew (TKM); W 001–000	Kim (KOR); L 000–100	Did not advance			9
Saeid Mollaei	Men's 73 kg	Al-Ali (KUW); W 100–000	Akimoto (JPN); L 000–100	Did not advance			9
Amir Ghaseminejad	Men's 81 kg	Bye	Rahimov (TJK); W 101–000	Elias (LIB); L 000–101	Repechage; Imamov (UZB); L 000–100	Did not advance	7
Mohammad Jamali	Men's 90 kg	Bye	Thwaib (PLE); W 100–000	Yoshida (JPN); L 000–010	Repechage; Cheng (CHN); W 100–001	3rd place match Otgonbaatar (MGL); L 000–000	5
Javad Mahjoub	Men's 100 kg	—N/a	Yan (MYA); W 100–000	Ýalkapow (TKM); W 101–000	Rakov (KAZ); L 000–100	3rd place match Cho (KOR); L 000–111	5
Ehsan Bahramian; Saeid Mollaei; Amir Ghaseminejad; Mohammad Jamali; Javad Mahjoub	Men's team	—N/a	China; W 3–2	South Korea; L 0–5	Repechage; Turkmenistan; W 3–2	3rd place match Uzbekistan; L 1–4	5

=== Kabaddi ===
Team	Event	Preliminary round				Semifinal	Final	Rank
Team	Event	Round 1	Round 2	Round 3	Rank	Semifinal	Final	Rank
Iran	Men	Malaysia; W 56–22	South Korea; W 41–22	Japan; W 53–21	1 Q	Pakistan; W 25–14	India; L 25–27	2nd place, silver medalist(s)
Iran	Women	Japan; W 34–23	Chinese Taipei; W 43–19	Thailand; W 37–25	1 Q	Bangladesh; W 40–15	India; L 21–31	2nd place, silver medalist(s)
Roster – Men: Fazel Atrachali; Meraj Sheikh; Mehdi Mousavi; Hadi Oshtorak; Gholam Abbas Korouki; Farhad Rahimi; Mohammad Maghsoudloo; Meisam Abbasi; Hadi Tajik; Reza Kamali Moghaddam; Abolfazl Maghsoudloo; Meisam Ghajar; Coach: Gholamreza Mazandarani Roster – Women: Salimeh Abdollahbakhsh; Zahra Masoumabadi; Marzieh Eshghi; Maliheh Miri; Sedigheh Jafari; Ghazal Khalaj; Farideh Zarifdoust; Mojgan Zare; Hengameh Bourghani; Sahar Ilat; Saeideh Jafari; Tahereh Tirgar; Coach: Azam Maghsoudloo

=== Karate ===
Athlete	Event	Round of 32	Round of 16	Quarterfinal	Semifinal	Final	Rank
Amir Mehdizadeh	Men's 60 kg	Bye	Davlatov (TJK); W 8–0	Wang (CHN); W 11–4	Lee (KOR); W 3–2	Al-Masatfa (JOR); W 6–3	1st place, gold medalist(s)
Hossein Samandar	Men's 67 kg	Bye	Al-Shatti (KUW); L 3–3	Did not advance			13
Saeid Hassanipour	Men's 75 kg	—N/a	Zokhidov (UZB); W 4–2	Hồ (VIE); W 10–2	Al-Otaibi (KSA); W 5–2	Lee (HKG); W 2–0	1st place, gold medalist(s)
Sajjad Ganjzadeh	Men's +84 kg	—N/a	Peng (CHN); W 7–1	Al-Mulla (UAE); W 11–4	Kagawa (JPN); L 6–9, DSQ	Did not advance	—
Nasrin Dousti	Women's 50 kg	Bye	Kang (PRK); W 8–0	Sukatendel (INA); W 4–3	Khupovets (KAZ); L 0–4	3rd place match Kamchybekova (KGZ); W 6–1	3rd place, bronze medalist(s)
Fatemeh Chalaki	Women's 61 kg	—N/a	Lee (HKG); W 3–0	Mirzaeva (UZB); L 2–4	Did not advance	3rd place match Shin (KOR); W 3–2	3rd place, bronze medalist(s)
Pegah Zangeneh	Women's 68 kg	—N/a	Hazara (PAK); W 1–0	Gafurova (KAZ); L 2–5	Did not advance	3rd place match Shree Sharmini (MAS); L 1–2	5
Hamideh Abbasali	Women's +68 kg	—N/a		Carion (MAC); W 5–1	Puspitasari (INA); W 7–0	Zeng (CHN); W 3–1	1st place, gold medalist(s)

=== Rowing ===
Athlete	Event	Heat		Repechage		Final		Rank
Athlete	Event	Time	Rank	Time	Rank	Time	Rank	Rank
Mohsen Shadi	Men's single sculls	7:08.21	1 QA	Bye		7:05.66	1	1st place, gold medalist(s)
Mojtaba Shojaei; Amir Rahnama	Men's double sculls	6:39.59	3	6:41.19	2 QA	6:33.22	3	3rd place, bronze medalist(s)
Siavash Saeidi; Khashayar Abbasabadi; Masoud Fathi; Saber Naderi	Men's quadruple sculls	6:19.00	4	6:11.21	2 QA	6:42.70	4	4
Saeid Adeli; Yaser Johari; Masoud Mohammadi; Afshar Heidari; Atabak Pishyar; Farhad Gholizadeh; Farzad Gholizadeh; Vahid Johari; Keyhan Shamsi	Men's eight	6:05.41	5 QA	—N/a		6:01.41	5	5
Aghel Habibian	Men's lightweight single sculls	7:38.36	3	7:17.30	1 QA	7:27.67	4	4
Nazanin Rahmani	Women's single sculls	8:32.69	4 QA	—N/a		9:34.00	4	4
Maryam Saeidi; Nazanin Rahmani; Mahsa Javer; Nazanin Malaei	Women's quadruple sculls	7:15.70	4	7:05.87	2 QA	7:08.89	6	6
Soulmaz Abbasi	Women's lightweight single sculls	8:31.26	4 QA	—N/a		8:10.53	3	3rd place, bronze medalist(s)
Homeira Barzegar; Nazanin Malaei; Mahsa Javer; Soulmaz Abbasi	Women's lightweight quadruple sculls	7:00.22	2	6:53.15	3 QA	7:37.24	3	3rd place, bronze medalist(s)

=== Sailing ===
Athlete	Event	Race												Total	Rank
Athlete	Event	1	2	3	4	5	6	7	8	9	10	11	12	Total	Rank
Ahmad Ahmadi	Men's Laser	10	9	8	~~13~~	7	8	9	6	9	8	8	9	91	9

=== Shooting ===
Athlete	Event	Qualification		Semifinal		Final		Team events			
Athlete	Event	Score	Rank	Score	Rank	Score	Rank	Athlete	Event	Score	Rank
Mohammad Ahmadi	Men's 10 m air pistol	569	32	—N/a		Did not advance		Mohammad Ahmadi; Ebrahim Barkhordari; Ebrahim Rahimi	Men's 10 m air pistol team	1706	10
Ebrahim Barkhordari	Men's 10 m air pistol	569	31	—N/a		Did not advance		Mohammad Ahmadi; Ebrahim Barkhordari; Ebrahim Rahimi	Men's 10 m air pistol team	1706	10
Ebrahim Rahimi	Men's 10 m air pistol	568	33	—N/a		Did not advance		Mohammad Ahmadi; Ebrahim Barkhordari; Ebrahim Rahimi	Men's 10 m air pistol team	1706	10
Mohammad Ahmadi	Men's 50 m pistol	553	11	—N/a		Did not advance		Mohammad Ahmadi; Ebrahim Barkhordari; Ebrahim Rahimi	Men's 50 m pistol team	1640	7
Ebrahim Barkhordari	Men's 50 m pistol	550	19	—N/a		Did not advance		Mohammad Ahmadi; Ebrahim Barkhordari; Ebrahim Rahimi	Men's 50 m pistol team	1640	7
Ebrahim Rahimi	Men's 50 m pistol	537	36	—N/a		Did not advance		Mohammad Ahmadi; Ebrahim Barkhordari; Ebrahim Rahimi	Men's 50 m pistol team	1640	7
Hossein Bagheri	Men's 10 m air rifle	619.0	18	—N/a		Did not advance		Hossein Bagheri; Mehdi Jafari Pouya; Pouria Norouzian	Men's 10 m air rifle team	1860.8	4
Mehdi Jafari Pouya	Men's 10 m air rifle	618.9	19	—N/a		Did not advance		Hossein Bagheri; Mehdi Jafari Pouya; Pouria Norouzian	Men's 10 m air rifle team	1860.8	4
Pouria Norouzian	Men's 10 m air rifle	622.9	7 Q	—N/a		165.6	4	Hossein Bagheri; Mehdi Jafari Pouya; Pouria Norouzian	Men's 10 m air rifle team	1860.8	4
Hossein Bagheri	Men's 50 m rifle prone	613.2	28	—N/a		Did not advance		Hossein Bagheri; Mehdi Jafari Pouya; Sasan Shahsavari	Men's 50 m rifle prone team	1845.4	7
Mehdi Jafari Pouya	Men's 50 m rifle prone	617.8	17	—N/a		Did not advance		Hossein Bagheri; Mehdi Jafari Pouya; Sasan Shahsavari	Men's 50 m rifle prone team	1845.4	7
Sasan Shahsavari	Men's 50 m rifle prone	614.4	25	—N/a		Did not advance		Hossein Bagheri; Mehdi Jafari Pouya; Sasan Shahsavari	Men's 50 m rifle prone team	1845.4	7
Hossein Bagheri	Men's 50 m rifle 3 positions	1136	32	—N/a		Did not advance		Hossein Bagheri; Mehdi Jafari Pouya; Sasan Shahsavari	Men's 50 m rifle 3 positions team	3428	7
Mehdi Jafari Pouya	Men's 50 m rifle 3 positions	1146	24	—N/a		Did not advance		Hossein Bagheri; Mehdi Jafari Pouya; Sasan Shahsavari	Men's 50 m rifle 3 positions team	3428	7
Sasan Shahsavari	Men's 50 m rifle 3 positions	1146	23	—N/a		Did not advance		Hossein Bagheri; Mehdi Jafari Pouya; Sasan Shahsavari	Men's 50 m rifle 3 positions team	3428	7
Babak Yeganeh	Men's trap	113	25	Did not advance				—N/a			
Masoud Azizian	Men's double trap	DNS	—	Did not advance				Masoud Azizian; Amir Chavoshi; Siavash Khoshnevis	Men's double trap team	DNS	—
Amir Chavoshi	Men's double trap	131	14	Did not advance				Masoud Azizian; Amir Chavoshi; Siavash Khoshnevis	Men's double trap team	DNS	—
Siavash Khoshnevis	Men's double trap	126	24	Did not advance				Masoud Azizian; Amir Chavoshi; Siavash Khoshnevis	Men's double trap team	DNS	—
Sarina Gharabat	Women's 10 m air pistol	368	35	—N/a		Did not advance		Sarina Gharabat; Elham Harijani; Sara Mirabi	Women's 10 m air pistol team	1116	9
Elham Harijani	Women's 10 m air pistol	372	29	—N/a		Did not advance		Sarina Gharabat; Elham Harijani; Sara Mirabi	Women's 10 m air pistol team	1116	9
Sara Mirabi	Women's 10 m air pistol	376	18	—N/a		Did not advance		Sarina Gharabat; Elham Harijani; Sara Mirabi	Women's 10 m air pistol team	1116	9
Sarina Gharabat	Women's 25 m pistol	535	38	Did not advance				Sarina Gharabat; Elham Harijani; Maryam Soltani	Women's 25 m pistol team	1651	10
Elham Harijani	Women's 25 m pistol	546	34	Did not advance				Sarina Gharabat; Elham Harijani; Maryam Soltani	Women's 25 m pistol team	1651	10
Maryam Soltani	Women's 25 m pistol	570	22	Did not advance				Sarina Gharabat; Elham Harijani; Maryam Soltani	Women's 25 m pistol team	1651	10
Elaheh Ahmadi	Women's 10 m air rifle	412.4	19	—N/a		Did not advance		Elaheh Ahmadi; Narjes Emamgholinejad; Najmeh Khedmati	Women's 10 m air rifle team	1245.9	2nd place, silver medalist(s)
Narjes Emamgholinejad	Women's 10 m air rifle	416.3	6 Q	—N/a		206.6	2nd place, silver medalist(s)	Elaheh Ahmadi; Narjes Emamgholinejad; Najmeh Khedmati	Women's 10 m air rifle team	1245.9	2nd place, silver medalist(s)
Najmeh Khedmati	Women's 10 m air rifle	417.2	4 Q	—N/a		207.9 GR	1st place, gold medalist(s)	Elaheh Ahmadi; Narjes Emamgholinejad; Najmeh Khedmati	Women's 10 m air rifle team	1245.9	2nd place, silver medalist(s)
Elaheh Ahmadi	Women's 50 m rifle prone	609.8	34	—N/a				Elaheh Ahmadi; Dina Farzadkhah; Mahlagha Jambozorg	Women's 50 m rifle prone team	1840.5	8
Dina Farzadkhah	Women's 50 m rifle prone	610.5	31	—N/a				Elaheh Ahmadi; Dina Farzadkhah; Mahlagha Jambozorg	Women's 50 m rifle prone team	1840.5	8
Mahlagha Jambozorg	Women's 50 m rifle prone	620.2	4	—N/a				Elaheh Ahmadi; Dina Farzadkhah; Mahlagha Jambozorg	Women's 50 m rifle prone team	1840.5	8
Elaheh Ahmadi	Women's 50 m rifle 3 positions	569	28	—N/a		Did not advance		Elaheh Ahmadi; Dina Farzadkhah; Mahlagha Jambozorg	Women's 50 m rifle 3 positions team	1721	7
Dina Farzadkhah	Women's 50 m rifle 3 positions	574	22	—N/a		Did not advance		Elaheh Ahmadi; Dina Farzadkhah; Mahlagha Jambozorg	Women's 50 m rifle 3 positions team	1721	7
Mahlagha Jambozorg	Women's 50 m rifle 3 positions	578	9	—N/a		Did not advance		Elaheh Ahmadi; Dina Farzadkhah; Mahlagha Jambozorg	Women's 50 m rifle 3 positions team	1721	7
Shiva Farahpour	Women's trap	66	13	Did not advance				Shiva Farahpour; Bahareh Jahandar; Marzieh Parvareshnia	Women's trap team	192	4
Bahareh Jahandar	Women's trap	60	28	Did not advance				Shiva Farahpour; Bahareh Jahandar; Marzieh Parvareshnia	Women's trap team	192	4
Marzieh Parvareshnia	Women's trap	66	10	Did not advance				Shiva Farahpour; Bahareh Jahandar; Marzieh Parvareshnia	Women's trap team	192	4

=== Table tennis ===
Athlete	Event	Round of 64	Round of 32	Round of 16	Quarterfinal	Semifinal	Final	Rank
Noshad Alamian	Men's singles	Bye	Rameez (PAK); W 4–0 (6, 5, 4, 7)	Mizutani (JPN); L 1–4 (−4, −7, 6, −6, −5)	Did not advance			9
Afshin Norouzi	Men's singles	Bye	Al-Kades (YEM); W 4–1 (3, −4, 2, 3, 9)	Niwa (JPN); L 1–4 (8, −5, −7, −9, −11)	Did not advance			9
Noshad Alamian; Afshin Norouzi	Men's doubles	Bye	Shemet and Al-Naggar (QAT); W 3–0 (7, 10, 6)	Ma and Zhang (CHN); L 0–3 (−4, −7, −3)	Did not advance			9
Neda Shahsavari	Women's singles	Bye	Lee (HKG); L 0–4 (−5, −2, −6, −8)	Did not advance				17

=== Taekwondo ===
Athlete	Event	Round of 32	Round of 16	Quarterfinal	Semifinal	Final	Rank
Farzan Ashourzadeh	Men's 58 kg	Khalifah (JOR); W 9–2	Karaket (THA); W 11–2	Zhao (CHN); W 11–10	Wei (TPE); W 13–6	Mamayev (KAZ); W 7–4	1st place, gold medalist(s)
Behnam Asbaghi	Men's 68 kg	Bye	Phan (VIE); W 9–0	Bakhazi (LIB); W 9–0	Sarymsakov (KAZ); W 7–1	Huang (CHN); W 5–4	1st place, gold medalist(s)
Masoud Hajji-Zavareh	Men's 74 kg	Bye	Dương (VIE); W 6–0	Singh (IND); W 8–0	Morrison (PHI); W RSC (5–1)	Rafalovich (UZB); W 3–2	1st place, gold medalist(s)
Mehdi Khodabakhshi	Men's 80 kg	—N/a	Airie (NEP); W 16–0	Ebata (JPN); W 5–1	Negmatov (TJK); W 7–2	Rafalovich (UZB); W 5–1	1st place, gold medalist(s)
Yousef Karami	Men's 87 kg	—N/a	Baykuziyev (UZB); L 4–5	Did not advance			9
Sajjad Mardani	Men's +87 kg	—N/a		Jo (KOR); L 5–6	Did not advance		5
Sousan Hajipour	Women's 53 kg	—N/a	Aldangorova (KAZ); W 9–3	Phongsri (THA); W 7–6	Huang (TPE); L 0–5	Did not advance	3rd place, bronze medalist(s)
Samaneh Sheshpari	Women's 57 kg	Halinda (INA); W 12–6	Sharipova (TJK); W 12–0	Lee (KOR); L 1–13	Did not advance		5
Shokraneh Izadi	Women's 67 kg	—N/a	Bye	Liu (MAC); L 7–8	Did not advance		5
Fatemeh Rouhani	Women's 73 kg	—N/a	Bye	Jaafar (BRU); W 19–1	Al-Fahad (KUW); W 16–3	Sorn (CAM); L 4–7	2nd place, silver medalist(s)
Akram Khodabandeh	Women's +73 kg	—N/a		Sorn (CAM); W 8–1	Wang (MAC); W 14–2	Li (CHN); L 8–10	2nd place, silver medalist(s)

=== Volleyball ===
Team	Event	Preliminary round				Second round			Quarterfinal	Semifinal	Final	Rank
Team	Event	Round 1	Round 2	Round 3	Rank	Round 1	Round 2	Rank	Quarterfinal	Semifinal	Final	Rank
Iran	Men	Hong Kong; W 3–0 (25–16, 25–17, 25–12)	India; W 3–0 (25–22, 25–22, 25–18)	Maldives; W 3–0 (25–10, 25–19, 25–21)	1 Q	Qatar; W 3–0 (25–19, 25–18, 25–19)	South Korea; W 3–1 (25–21, 25–19, 23–25, 25–19)	1 Q	Kuwait; W 3–0 (25–21, 25–18, 25–14)	China; W 3–0 (25–15, 25–15, 25–19)	Japan; W 3–1 (28–26, 23–25, 25–19, 25–19)	1st place, gold medalist(s)
Roster: Shahram Mahmoudi; Milad Ebadipour; Saeid Marouf; Farhad Ghaemi; Mohammad Mousavi; Pouria Fayazi; Farhad Zarif; Adel Gholami; Amir Ghafour; Mojtaba Mirzajanpour; Mehdi Mahdavi; Armin Tashakkori; Coach: (Serbia) Slobodan Kovač

=== Weightlifting ===
Athlete	Event	Snatch		Clean & Jerk		Total	
Athlete	Event	Result	Rank	Result	Rank	Result	Rank
Majid Askari	Men's 56 kg	124	5	146	7	270	6
Jaber Behrouzi	Men's 69 kg	144	5	NM	—	—	—
Kianoush Rostami	Men's 85 kg	172	1	208	2	380	2nd place, silver medalist(s)
Rasoul Taghian	Men's 85 kg	163	4	205	4	368	4
Navab Nassirshalal	Men's 105 kg	181	3	NM	—	—	—
Bahador Molaei	Men's +105 kg	177	7	NM	—	—	—
Behdad Salimi	Men's +105 kg	210 GR	1	255 GR	1	465 GR	1st place, gold medalist(s)

=== Wrestling ===
Freestyle

Athlete	Event	Round of 16	Quarterfinal	Semifinal	Final	Rank
Hassan Rahimi	Men's 57 kg	Nadyrbek Uulu (KGZ); W 10–0	Yun (KOR); L 0–1	Did not advance		7
Masoud Esmaeilpour	Men's 61 kg	Kenjaev (UZB); W 11–1	Lee (KOR); W 7–2	Niyazbekov (KAZ); W 8–3	Punia (IND); W 6–4	1st place, gold medalist(s)
Mostafa Hosseinkhani	Men's 70 kg	Omurzhanov (KAZ); W 5–1	Kojima (JPN); L 3–3	Did not advance		7
Ezzatollah Akbari	Men's 74 kg	Bye	Butt (PAK); W 10–0	Lee (KOR); W 4–3	Kurbanov (UZB); L 2–3	2nd place, silver medalist(s)
Meisam Mostafa-Jokar	Men's 86 kg	Zhang (CHN); W 11–1	Kumar (IND); W 10–0	Kim (KOR); W 4–1	Nurzhumbayev (KAZ); W 14–4	1st place, gold medalist(s)
Reza Yazdani	Men's 97 kg	Bye	Khüderbulga (MGL); W 6–0	Yoon (KOR); W 6–1	Musaev (KGZ); W 14–4	1st place, gold medalist(s)
Parviz Hadi	Men's 125 kg	Deng (CHN); W 11–0	Chuluunbat (MGL); W 4–0	Nam (KOR); W 9–1	Shabanbay (KAZ); W 6–1	1st place, gold medalist(s)

Greco-Roman

Athlete	Event	Round of 16	Quarterfinal	Semifinal	Final	Rank
Afshin Biabangard	Men's 66 kg	Tsarev (KGZ); W 8–0	Ryu (KOR); L 0–3	Repechage; Zheng (CHN); W 5–3	3rd place match Tasmuradov (UZB); W 7–1	3rd place, bronze medalist(s)
Saeid Abdevali	Men's 71 kg	Bye	Yerezhepov (KAZ); W 4–1	Jung (KOR); L 6–9	3rd place match Yadav (IND); W 6–0	3rd place, bronze medalist(s)
Payam Boveiri	Men's 75 kg	Khashimbekov (UZB); W 9–5	Singh (IND); W 7–2	Kanakubo (JPN); L 1–1	3rd place match Ataýew (TKM); W 9–0	3rd place, bronze medalist(s)
Habibollah Akhlaghi	Men's 80 kg	—N/a	Khan (QAT); W 9–1	Saldadze (UZB); W 9–0	Tsurumaki (JPN); W 5–1	1st place, gold medalist(s)
Mojtaba Karimfar	Men's 85 kg	Shahin (JOR); W 8–0	Lee (KOR); L 3CA (5–3)	Repechage; Oka (JPN); W 2–0	3rd place match Beishebekov (KGZ); W 3–0	3rd place, bronze medalist(s)
Mehdi Aliyari	Men's 98 kg	Bye	Saleh (SYR); W 9–0	Iskakov (KAZ); W 3–1	Xiao (CHN); W 8–0	1st place, gold medalist(s)
Bashir Babajanzadeh	Men's 130 kg	Dalal (IND); W 8–0	Tinaliyev (KAZ); L 0–1	Repechage; Mamasoliev (UZB); W 5–0	3rd place match Ramonov (KGZ); W 4–1	3rd place, bronze medalist(s)

=== Wushu ===
Taolu

Athlete	Event	Round 1			Round 2			Total	Rank
Athlete	Event	Form	Score	Rank	Form	Score	Rank	Total	Rank
Ehsan Peighambari	Men's changquan	—N/a						9.51	6
Farshad Arabi	Men's nanquan & nangun	Nanquan	9.53	8	Nangun	9.63	4	19.16	8
Hanieh Rajabi	Women's changquan	—N/a						9.27	9
Hamideh Barkhor	Women's taijiquan & taijijian	Taijijian	8.33	10	Taijiquan	9.13	10	17.46	10

Sanda

Athlete	Event	Round of 16	Quarterfinal	Semifinal	Final	Rank
Akbar Mohammadzadeh	Men's 56 kg	Zhao (CHN); L 0–2	Did not advance			9
Mohsen Mohammadseifi	Men's 65 kg	Tabugara (PHI); W TV	Bozhoev (KGZ); W 2–0	Chen (CHN); W 2–0	Livensho (KAZ); W 2–0	1st place, gold medalist(s)
Sajjad Abbasi	Men's 70 kg	Bye	Jumanyýazow (TKM); W 2–0	Yoo (KOR); L 1–2	Did not advance	3rd place, bronze medalist(s)
Hamid Reza Ladvar	Men's 75 kg	Maharjan (NEP); W 2–0	Zeyad (JOR); W 2–1	Tursynkulov (KAZ); W 2–0	Kim (KOR); L 1–2	2nd place, silver medalist(s)
Elaheh Mansourian	Women's 52 kg	Gaol (INA); W 2–0	Gurung (NEP); W 2–0	Kim (KOR); W 2–0	Zhang (CHN); L 0–2	2nd place, silver medalist(s)
Shahrbanoo Mansourian	Women's 60 kg	Bye	Wang (CHN); L 0–2	Did not advance		5
