= Karate at the 2014 Asian Games – Men's kumite 75 kg =

Karate competition

Men's kumite 75 kg at the 2014 Asian Games
- Venue: Gyeyang Gymnasium
- Date: 2 October 2014
- Competitors: 13 from 13 nations

Medalists
gold medal	Saeid Hassanipour	Iran
silver medal	Lee Ka Wai	Hong Kong
bronze medal	Gofurjon Zokhidov	Uzbekistan
bronze medal	Songvut Muntaen	Thailand

The men's kumite 75 kilograms competition at the 2014 Asian Games in Incheon, South Korea was held on 2 October 2014 at the Gyeyang Gymnasium.

== Schedule ==
All times are Korea Standard Time (UTC+09:00)

Date	Time	Event
Thursday, 2 October 2014	13:30	1/8 finals
Thursday, 2 October 2014	13:30	Quarterfinals
Thursday, 2 October 2014	13:30	Semifinals
Thursday, 2 October 2014	13:30	Final of repechage
Thursday, 2 October 2014	15:40	Finals

== Results ==
Legend

- H — Won by hansoku (8–0)

=== Main bracket ===
1/8 finals
Gofurjon Zokhidov (UZB)	2
Saeid Hassanipour (IRI)	4
Gianzhali Abasov (KGZ)	3
Hồ Đình Thuận (VIE)	5
Baz Muhammad (PAK)	2
Hosam Momdouh (QAT)	4
Diwas Shrestha (NEP)	5
Abdullah Al-Otaibi (KUW)	3
Yen Tzu-yao (TPE)	1
Lee Ka Wai (HKG)	1

Quarterfinals
Saeid Hassanipour (IRI)	10
Hồ Đình Thuận (VIE)	2
Hosam Momdouh (QAT)	0
Bader Al-Otaibi (KSA)	7
Diwas Shrestha (NEP)	0
Mohammad Al-Rifi (JOR)	8
Lee Ka Wai (HKG)	7
Songvut Muntaen (THA)	2

Semifinals
Saeid Hassanipour (IRI)	5
Bader Al-Otaibi (KSA)	2
Mohammad Al-Rifi (JOR)	3
Lee Ka Wai (HKG)	10

Final
Saeid Hassanipour (IRI)	2
Lee Ka Wai (HKG)	0

=== Repechage ===
Final of repechage
Gofurjon Zokhidov (UZB)	5
Hồ Đình Thuận (VIE)	3
Yen Tzu-yao (TPE)	5
Songvut Muntaen (THA)	6

Bronze medal contest
Gofurjon Zokhidov (UZB)	H
Bader Al-Otaibi (KSA)
Songvut Muntaen (THA)	5
Mohammad Al-Rifi (JOR)	3
