= Boxing at the 2014 Asian Games – Men's 81 kg =

Boxing competitions

Men's 81 kg at the 2014 Asian Games
- Venue: Seonhak Gymnasium
- Date: 26 September – 3 October 2014
- Competitors: 13 from 13 nations

Medalists
gold medal	Adilbek Niyazymbetov	Kazakhstan
silver medal	Kim Hyeong-kyu	South Korea
bronze medal	Oybek Mamazulunov	Uzbekistan
bronze medal	Ehsan Rouzbahani	Iran

The men's light heavyweight (81 kilograms) event at the 2014 Asian Games took place from 26 September to 3 October 2014 at Seonhak Gymnasium, Incheon, South Korea.

Like all Asian Games boxing events, the competition was a straight single-elimination tournament. All bouts consisted of three three-minute rounds.

A total of 13 men from 13 countries competed in this event, the competition was limited to fighters whose body weight was less than 81 kilograms.

Adilbek Niyazymbetov of Kazakhstan won the gold medal. He beat Kim Hyeong-kyu from South Korea 2–1 on points in the final bout at the Seonhak Gymnasium.

== Schedule ==
All times are Korea Standard Time (UTC+09:00)

Date	Time	Event
Friday, 26 September 2014	14:00	Preliminaries
Monday, 29 September 2014	19:00	Quarterfinals
Thursday, 2 October 2014	14:00	Semifinals
Friday, 3 October 2014	14:00	Final

== Results ==
Legend

- TKO — Won by technical knockout

Preliminaries
Oybek Mamazulunov (UZB)	3
Sandagsürengiin Erdenebayar (MGL)	0
Ehsan Rouzbahani (IRI)	3
Tashi Norbu (BHU)	0
Kuldeep Singh (IND)	2
Anavat Thongkrathok (THA)	1
Alaaeddin Ghossoun (SYR)	0
Adilbek Niyazymbetov (KAZ)	3
Ahmad Al-Fadhli (KUW)
Zhang Aolin (CHN)	TKO

Quarterfinals
Kim Hyeong-kyu (KOR)	3
Arslanbek Açilow (TKM)	0
Najd Salloum (LIB)
Oybek Mamazulunov (UZB)	TKO
Ehsan Rouzbahani (IRI)	3
Kuldeep Singh (IND)	0
Adilbek Niyazymbetov (KAZ)	3
Zhang Aolin (CHN)	0

Semifinals
Kim Hyeong-kyu (KOR)	3
Oybek Mamazulunov (UZB)	0
Ehsan Rouzbahani (IRI)	1
Adilbek Niyazymbetov (KAZ)	2

Final
Kim Hyeong-kyu (KOR)	1
Adilbek Niyazymbetov (KAZ)	2
