= Canoeing at the 2014 Asian Games – Women's K-1 200 metres =

Women's K-1 200 metres at the 2014 Asian Games
- Venue: Misari Regatta
- Date: 27–29 September 2014
- Competitors: 13 from 13 nations

Medalists
gold medal	Inna Klinova	Kazakhstan
silver medal	Zhou Yu	China
bronze medal	Arezoo Hakimi	Iran

The women's K-1 200 metres sprint canoeing competition at the 2014 Asian Games in Hanam was held from 27 to 29 September at the Misari Canoe/Kayak Center.

== Schedule ==
All times are Korea Standard Time (UTC+09:00)

Date	Time	Event
Saturday, 27 September 2014	14:00	Heats
Sunday, 28 September 2014	13:20	Semifinal
Monday, 29 September 2014	15:00	Final

== Results ==
=== Heats ===
- Qualification: 1–3 → Final (QF), Rest → Semifinal (QS)

==== Heat 1 ====
Rank	Athlete	Time	Notes
1	Inna Klinova (KAZ)	40.126	QF
2	Shiho Kakizaki (JPN)	41.352	QF
3	Arezoo Hakimi (IRI)	41.566	QF
4	Erni Sokoy (INA)	44.496	QS
5	Elena Rybalova (KGZ)	46.007	QS
6	Anusha Biju (IND)	46.782	QS
7	Leong Wai Sim (MAC)	55.221	QS

==== Heat 2 ====
Rank	Athlete	Time	Notes
1	Zhou Yu (CHN)	41.103	QF
2	Kim Guk-joo (KOR)	41.936	QF
3	Olga Umaralieva (UZB)	42.057	QF
4	Kanokpan Suansan (THA)	42.153	QS
5	Sarah Chen (SIN)	43.590	QS
6	Liu Yen-ting (TPE)	44.807	QS

=== Semifinal ===
- Qualification: 1–3 → Final (QF)

Rank	Athlete	Time	Notes
1	Kanokpan Suansan (THA)	43.453	QF
2	Sarah Chen (SIN)	44.513	QF
3	Erni Sokoy (INA)	44.961	QF
4	Liu Yen-ting (TPE)	46.009	
5	Elena Rybalova (KGZ)	47.438	
6	Anusha Biju (IND)	48.751	
7	Leong Wai Sim (MAC)	59.864	

=== Final ===
Rank	Athlete	Time
1st place, gold medalist(s)	Inna Klinova (KAZ)	40.638
2nd place, silver medalist(s)	Zhou Yu (CHN)	40.851
3rd place, bronze medalist(s)	Arezoo Hakimi (IRI)	41.807
4	Kim Guk-joo (KOR)	42.036
5	Shiho Kakizaki (JPN)	42.146
6	Olga Umaralieva (UZB)	42.528
7	Kanokpan Suansan (THA)	43.434
8	Sarah Chen (SIN)	44.229
9	Erni Sokoy (INA)	44.736
