= Karate at the 2014 Asian Games – Women's kumite +68 kg =

Karate competition

Women's kumite +68 kg at the 2014 Asian Games
- Venue: Gyeyang Gymnasium
- Date: 2 October 2014
- Competitors: 7 from 7 nations

Medalists
gold medal	Hamideh Abbasali	Iran
silver medal	Zeng Cuilan	China
bronze medal	Ayumi Uekusa	Japan
bronze medal	Paula Carion	Macau

The women's kumite +68 kilograms competition at the 2014 Asian Games in Incheon, South Korea was held on 2 October 2014 at the Gyeyang Gymnasium.

== Schedule ==
All times are Korea Standard Time (UTC+09:00)

Date	Time	Event
Thursday, 2 October 2014	13:30	Quarterfinals
Thursday, 2 October 2014	13:30	Semifinals
Thursday, 2 October 2014	15:40	Finals

== Results ==
=== Main bracket ===
Quarterfinals		Semifinals		Final
Ayumi Uekusa (JPN)	5
Khilola Badalova (UZB)	0	Ayumi Uekusa (JPN)	3
Zeng Cuilan (CHN)	7	Zeng Cuilan (CHN)	4
Cheon Han-na (KOR)	2			Zeng Cuilan (CHN)	1
Hamideh Abbasali (IRI)	5			Hamideh Abbasali (IRI)	3
Paula Carion (MAC)	1	Hamideh Abbasali (IRI)	7
		Yuswinda Eka Puspitasari (INA)	0

=== Repechage ===
Bronze medal contest
Cheon Han-na (KOR)	0
Ayumi Uekusa (JPN)	8
Paula Carion (MAC)	3
Yuswinda Eka Puspitasari (INA)	2
