= Shooting at the 2014 Asian Games – Women's trap =

Women's trap at the 2014 Asian Games
- Venue: Gyeonggido Shooting Range
- Dates: 23 September 2014
- Competitors: 34 from 13 nations

Medalists
gold medal	Zhu Jingyu	China
silver medal	Yukie Nakayama	Japan
bronze medal	Chattaya Kitcharoen	Thailand

The women's trap competition at the 2014 Asian Games in Incheon, South Korea was held on 23 September at the Gyeonggido Shooting Range.

== Schedule ==
All times are Korea Standard Time (UTC+09:00)

Date	Time	Event
Tuesday, 23 September 2014	09:30	Qualification
Tuesday, 23 September 2014	14:45	Semifinal
Tuesday, 23 September 2014	14:45	Finals

== Records ==
Prior to this competition, the existing world, Asian and Games records were as follows.

World Record	Jessica Rossi (ITA)	75	London, United Kingdom	4 August 2012
Asian Record	Chen Li (CHN)	74	Qingyuan, China	4 April 2006
Games Record	Yukie Nakayama (JPN)	71	Guangzhou, China	19 November 2010

== Results ==
=== Qualification ===
Rank	Athlete	Round			Total	S-off	Notes
Rank	Athlete	1	2	3	Total	S-off	Notes
1	Anastassiya Davydova (KAZ)	23	24	24	71		
2	Zhu Jingyu (CHN)	24	24	22	70		
3	Mariya Dmitriyenko (KAZ)	24	24	22	70		
4	Yukie Nakayama (JPN)	24	21	24	69		
5	Chae Hye-gyong (PRK)	25	20	24	69		
6	Chattaya Kitcharoen (THA)	23	23	22	68		
7	Amna Al-Abdulla (QAT)	22	23	22	67		
8	Chen Fang (CHN)	18	24	24	66		
9	Shreyasi Singh (IND)	20	24	22	66		
10	Marzieh Parvareshnia (IRI)	23	21	22	66		
11	Ray Bassil (LIB)	24	20	22	66		
12	Kang Gee-eun (KOR)	24	20	22	66		
13	Shiva Farahpour (IRI)	23	22	21	66		
14	Pak Yong-hui (PRK)	21	22	22	65		
15	Yang Sol-i (PRK)	21	22	21	64		
16	Lin Yi-chun (TPE)	23	21	20	64		
17	Seema Tomar (IND)	20	19	24	63		
18	Lee Bo-na (KOR)	21	20	22	63		
19	Zhu Mei (CHN)	22	20	21	63		
20	Keiko Hattori (JPN)	22	20	21	63		
21	Thitithan Nongpromma (THA)	24	21	18	63		
22	Oxana Sereda (KAZ)	23	18	21	62		
23	Hsu Jie-yu (TPE)	19	20	22	61		
24	Kholoud Al-Khalaf (QAT)	22	22	17	61		
25	Sarah Al-Hawal (KUW)	18	20	22	60		
26	Hoàng Thị Tuất (VIE)	19	20	21	60		
27	Eom So-yeon (KOR)	19	22	19	60		
28	Bahareh Jahandar (IRI)	22	20	18	60		
29	Megumi Inoue (JPN)	18	20	21	59		
30	Shagun Chowdhary (IND)	20	19	20	59		
31	Nanpapas Viravaidya (THA)	21	18	20	59		
32	Huang Yen-hua (TPE)	18	18	21	57		
33	Asmaa Al-Qatami (KUW)	19	19	17	55		
34	Nawal Al-Khalaf (QAT)	18	15	16	49		

=== Semifinal ===
Rank	Athlete	Score	S-off
1	Yukie Nakayama (JPN)	15	
2	Zhu Jingyu (CHN)	13	
3	Chattaya Kitcharoen (THA)	11	
3	Anastassiya Davydova (KAZ)	11	
5	Chae Hye-gyong (PRK)	10	
6	Mariya Dmitriyenko (KAZ)	9	

=== Finals ===
==== Bronze medal match ====
Rank	Athlete	Score	S-off
3rd place, bronze medalist(s)	Chattaya Kitcharoen (THA)	10	+1
4	Anastassiya Davydova (KAZ)	10	+0

==== Gold medal match ====
Rank	Athlete	Score	S-off
1st place, gold medalist(s)	Zhu Jingyu (CHN)	12	+2
2nd place, silver medalist(s)	Yukie Nakayama (JPN)	12	+1
