= Shek Wai Hung =

Hong Kong artistic gymnast

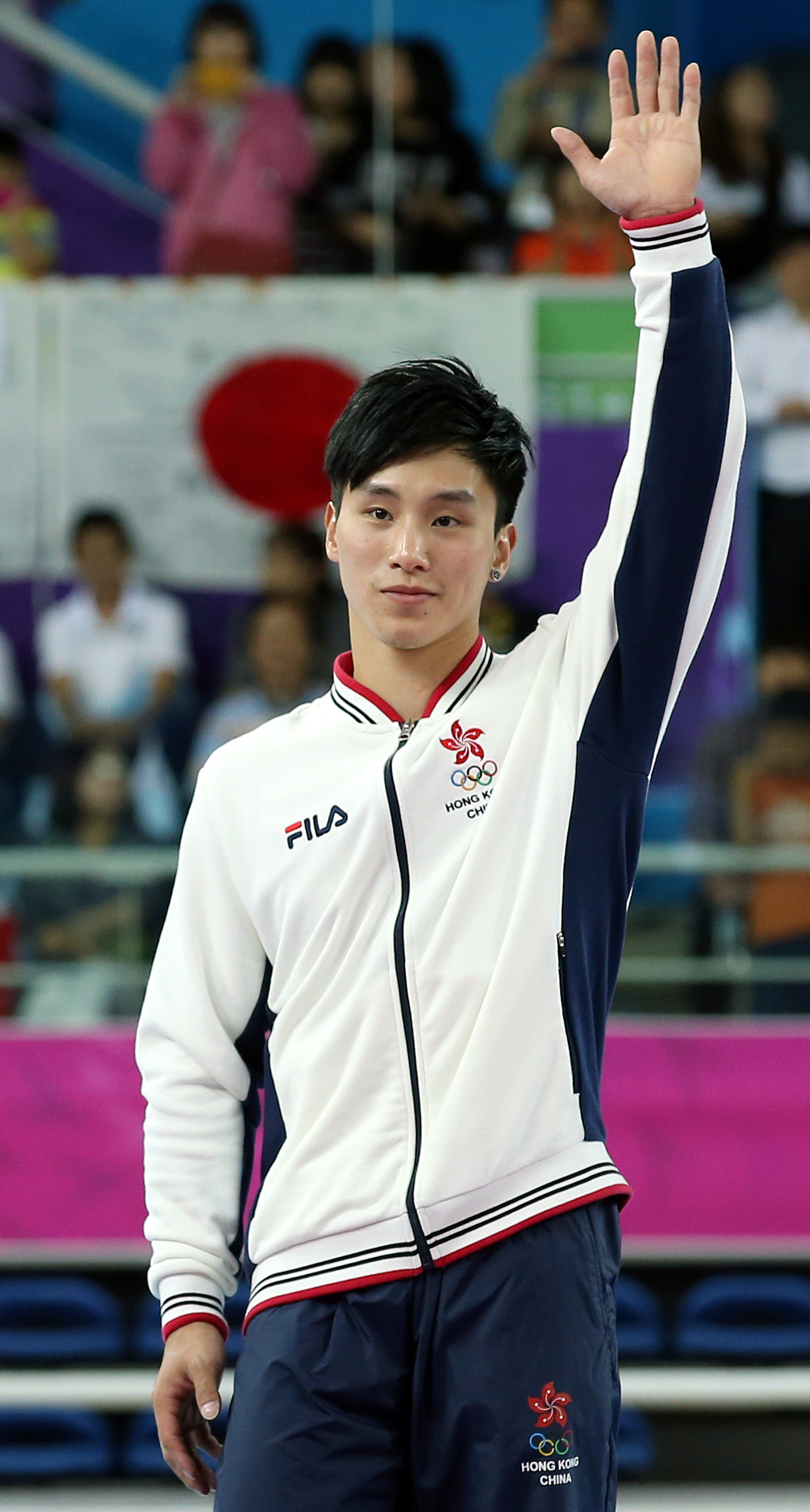
- Full name: Shek Wai Hung
- Nickname: Stone
- Born: October 10, 1991 (age 35) Hong Kong
- Height: 167 cm (5 ft 6 in)

Gymnastics career
- Country represented: Hong Kong
Medal record
Artistic gymnastics
Representing Hong Kong
Pacific Rim Championships
Gold medal – first place	2012 Everett	Vault
Bronze medal – third place	2010 Melbourne	Vault
Bronze medal – third place	2014 Richmond	Vault
Asian Games
Gold medal – first place	2014 Incheon	Vault
Gold medal – first place	2018 Jakarta-Palembang	Vault
Asian Championships
Gold medal – first place	2015 Hiroshima	Vault
Silver medal – second place	2015 Hiroshima	Horizontal bar

Shek Wai Hung (Chinese: 石偉雄; born 10 October 1991) is an artistic gymnast from Hong Kong. He is the 2014 and 2018 Asian Games champion in vault.

== Gymnastics career ==
Shek started gymnast training at the age of six. In 2008, Shek participated in the Pacific Rim Gymnastics Championships, where he won a gold medal in the junior vault final. At the 2010 Asian Games, Shek placed eighth in the individual all-around and sixth in vault.

In 2011, Shek participated in the World Championships in Tokyo, Japan, where he qualified fourth with an average score of 16.237 into the vault final – the first time for a Hong Kong gymnast to qualify into an event final at World Championships level. He came seventh in the final, having taken a big step forward on his first vault, with an average score of 15.950.

Shek qualified for the 2012 Summer Olympics in London, the United Kingdom via the Olympic Test Event in January that year. There, he finished 12th in the all-around qualification with a score of 86.482. This was the first time for Hong Kong to qualify two gymnasts, Shek and teammate Angel Wong to artistic gymnastics competition at the Olympic Games. The Olympics, however, proved to be a disappointing one to him. A fall on his first vault during qualification prevents Shek from advancing into the vault final, his strongest event.

Despite consideration of retiring from elite gymnastics, Shek continued his training after the disappointment at the London Olympics. In 2014, Shek participated in the Asian Games held in Incheon, South Korea, in which he had a surprising victory over the reigning Olympic Champion, World Champion and Asian Games champion in vault, Yang Hak-seon by a narrow margin of 0.016 points. Shek also made history by being the first gymnast from Hong Kong to win a medal in an artistic gymnastics event at the Asian Games. Just two weeks after the Asian Games, Shek took part in the 2014 World Artistic Gymnastics Championships in Nanning, China, where he came sixth in the vault final with an average score of 14.999.

In 2015, Shek competed at the World Championships held in Glasgow, the United Kingdom, where he came 36th in the individual all-around qualification and 10th in vault, being the second reserve of the vault final.

In 2018, Shek participated in the 2018 Asian Games held in Jakarta, Indonesia, where he won the gold medal in the men's vault.
