= Saeid Hassanipour =

Iranian karateka (born 1988)

- Born: 24 February 1988 (age 38); Rasht, Iran
- Style: Karate

Saeid Hassanipour Sefatazgomi (Persian: سعید حسنی‌پور, romanized: Sa’īd Hasanīpūr; born 24 February 1988 in Rasht) is an Iranian karateka. He started karate with his brother (Vahid) in 1995 at Rasht Electric Club under the supervision of Hossein Navidi. He started karate with SKI Shotokan style and played in Electric Club for five years, and then joined Yadegar-e Emam Club for an active presence in the world of the championship to work under Massoud Rahnama. Hassanipour won his first official international medal in Cyprus in 2005, winning the gold medal at the global campaigns, and South Korea's Incheon was the only Gilani gold medalist at the Asian Games.

== Birth ==
Saeid Hassanipour was born on February 24, 1988, in Rasht. He was the first to win a gold medal in the Asian Games Tournament -75 kg among Iranian karate players.

== Education ==
He holds a Bachelor of Science in civil engineering and a Master of business administration.

== Medals ==
Saeid Hassanipour has won several World and Asian Karate Championships for youth, hopes, and adults. He was named the only Gilanian gold man in Incheon by winning the gold medal in 2014 Asian Games. Hassanipour won the gold medal at the Asian Championships in Dubai, UAE at the 2013 Asian Karate Championships and won silver at the Islamic Countries Championships in Indonesia 2013. The champion added two more silver medals to the Qatar International Karate Championships and the Turkish World League Championships to the Iranian karate history in 2013. He won a silver medal in the World League Championships in France 2010, and won the gold medal in the Asian Hope Championship in Malaysia, 2008. Saeid Hassanipour's other honors include winning a silver medal in the World Hope Championship in Turkey 2007, a bronze medal in the U21 Karate Asia Championships in Singapore 2006, and a gold medal in the World Youth Championship in Cyprus 2005.

== Coaching records ==
Saeid Hassanipour was appointed as coach of the national karate team in 2016. He coached the Youth Karate Team in the World Championships in 2016, the Hope International Team at the Asian Championships in 2016, and Guilan's selected Karate team in the Asian champion league. After that, he was responsible for coaching the Adult National Team in the Asian Championship in Kazakhstan 2018, coaching the Adult National Team in the French, Turkish, and Emirates World Leagues, coaching the Adult National Team at the Spanish World Championships, coached Iran's Hope National Team at the Spanish and Austrian World Championships at the World Leagues. This Iranian karate player also coached the Adult National Team in the Turkish World League, the Russian World Championship, and the Asian Championship in Uzbekistan 2019. He currently coaches the National Adult Team to participate in the Tokyo Olympics 2020.

== Professional activities ==
Saeid Hassanipour became a National Olympic Committee's Athletes Commission member in 2017. He is the representative of Iran at the Asian Olympic Committee's Athletes Commission and in 2017, he became Vice President of the National Olympic Committee's Athletes Commission. He was also appointed ambassador of health by Hope Health Club in 2018.

== Sources ==
- en.farsnews.com
- en.irna.ir
- www.karaterec.com
- sportdata.org
