= Jasem Delavari =

Iranian boxer (1986–2025)

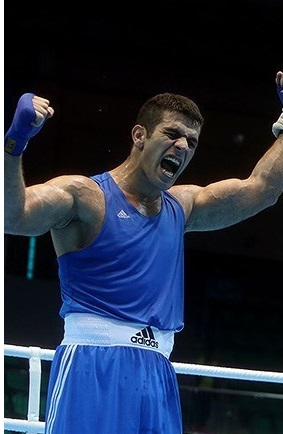
- Delavari in 2014

Personal information
- Nationality: Iranian
- Born: 2 September 1986 Ghaemshahr, Iran
- Died: 7 August 2025 (aged 38)

Sport
- Sport: Boxing
Medal record
Asian Games
Silver medal – second place	2014 Incheon	+91 kg
Bronze medal – third place	2006 Doha	+91 kg
Asian Championships
Bronze medal – third place	2013 Amman	+91 kg

Jasem Delavari (Persian: جاسم دلاوری, 2 September 1986 – 7 August 2025) was an Iranian amateur boxer who competed in the Super Heavyweight (+91 kg) division at the 2006 Asian Games winning the bronze medal in a lost bout against Uzbekistan's eventual gold medalist Rustam Saidov 11–31.

At the 2007 World Amateur Boxing Championships in Chicago he lost to Michael Hunter.

Delavari died after a long struggle with cancer, on 7 August 2025, at the age of 38.
