= Gu Guangming (boxer) =

Chinese boxer

Personal information
- Born: Mudanjiang, China

Professional wrestling career
- Ring name: Ming
- Billed height: 6 ft 8 in (2.03 m)
- Billed weight: 287 lb (130 kg)
- Trained by: WWE Performance Center
- Debut: October 21, 2017

Gu Guangming is a Chinese professional wrestler and former boxer. He is known for his work in WWE, where he performed in their developmental territory NXT under the ring name Ming.

== Boxing career ==
Gu competed in amateur boxing at the super-heavyweight division. He represented China at the 2013 AIBA World Boxing Championships and the 2014 Asian Games.

== Professional wrestling career ==
=== WWE ===
==== NXT (2016–2018) ====
Gu signed with WWE in September 2016 after attending a tryout in Shanghai. He reported to the WWE Performance Center along with three other Chinese recruits in February 2017.

In August 2017 Gu, using the name Ming, began appearing at NXT live events as an enforcer for Kona Reeves. He made his in-ring debut on 21 October 2017 at a NXT house show in Citrus Springs, Florida, where he lost to Angelo Dawkins. On March 8, 2018, WWE announced that Ming was officially released from his NXT contract.
