= Yuya Kamoto =

Japanese artistic gymnast

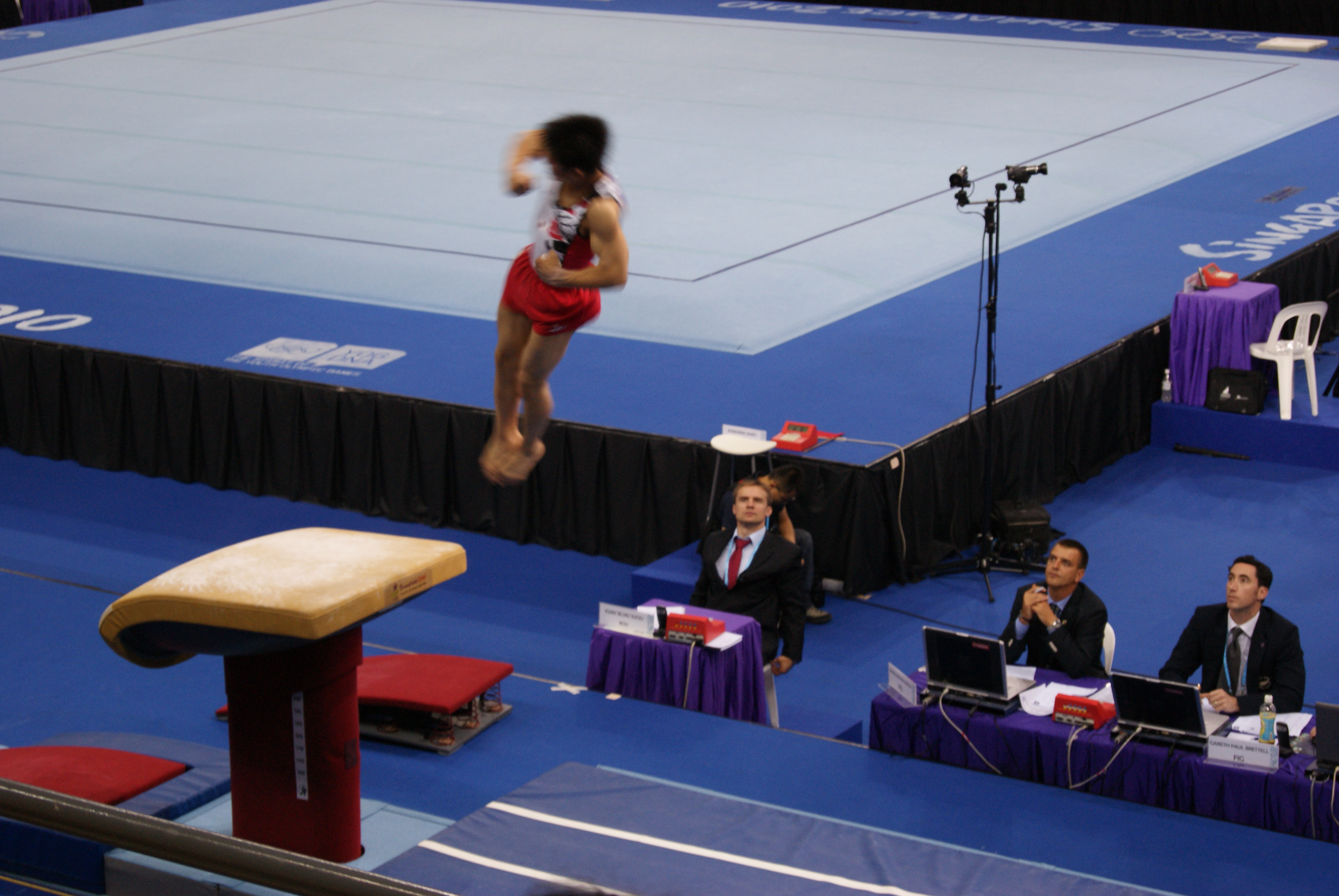

Personal information
- Born: September 14, 1994 (age 31) Tokyo

Gymnastics career
- Country represented: Japan
Medal record
Men's artistic gymnastics
Representing Japan
World Championships
| Silver medal – second place | 2022 Liverpool | Team |
| Bronze medal – third place | 2019 Stuttgart | Team |
Universiade
| Gold medal – first place | 2015 Gwangju | Team |
| Gold medal – first place | 2017 Taipei | Team |
| Silver medal – second place | 2015 Gwangju | Parallel bars |
| Bronze medal – third place | 2015 Gwangju | Horizontal bar |
Asian Games
| Gold medal – first place | 2014 Incheon | Team |
| Gold medal – first place | 2014 Incheon | All-around |
| Gold medal – first place | 2014 Incheon | Parallel bars |
| Bronze medal – third place | 2014 Incheon | Floor exercise |
Youth Olympic Games
| Gold medal – first place | 2010 Singapore | All-around |
| Silver medal – second place | 2010 Singapore | Rings |

Yuya Kamoto (神本 雄也, Kamoto Yūya; born 14 September 1994 in Tokyo) is a Japanese artistic gymnast and part of the national team. He won the gold medal at the 2014 Asian Games in men's gymnastics artistic individual all-around, as well as in the parallel bars and in the team event, held in Incheon, South Korea. He also won the bronze medal in men's floor gymnastics at the 2014 Asian Games.
