= Kazuyuki Takeda =

Japanese artistic gymnast

- Full name: 武田 一志
- Born: 3 August 1992 (age 34) Gunma, Japan
- Height: 1.60 m (5 ft 3 in)

Gymnastics career
- Discipline: Men's artistic gymnastics
- Country represented: Japan
- College team: Nittaidai
- Club: Tokushukai
- Head coaches: Yuji Sano; Yuya Shintaku; Naoki Morichika
Medal record
Representing Japan
Asian Games
Gold medal – first place	2014 Incheon	Team
Silver medal – second place	2014 Incheon	Rings
FIG World Cup
Event	1st	2nd	3rd
Apparatus World Cup	1	1	1
World Challenge Cup	0	4	0
Total	1	5	1

Kazuyuki Takeda (武田 一志, Takeda Kazuyuki; born 3 August 1992) is a Japanese artistic gymnast. Born in Gunma, Japan, he graduated from Nippon Sport Science University and later joined Tokushukai Gymnastics Club. He was part of the Japan men's national gymnastics team that won gold at the 2014 Asian Games.

== See also ==
- Japan men's national gymnastics team
- List of Asian Games medalists in gymnastics
