= Kim Hee-hoon =

South Korean gymnast (born 1991)

- 김희훈
- Alternative name: Kim Hui-hun
- Born: 22 November 1991 (age 34) Seoul, South Korea
- Height: 1.60 m (5 ft 3 in)

Gymnastics career
- Discipline: Men's artistic gymnastics
- Country represented: South Korea
Medal record
Representing South Korea
Asian Games
Silver medal – second place	2014 Incheon	Team
Bronze medal – third place	2010 Guangzhou	Team

Kim Hee-hoon (born 22 November 1991) is a South Korean gymnast. He competed at the 2012 Summer Olympics and the 2013 World Championships.
