= Syque Caesar =

Bangladeshi artistic gymnastics coach

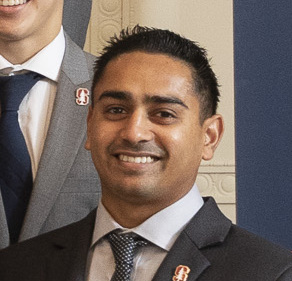
- Caesar in 2019

Personal information
- Full name: Quazi Syque Caesar
- Born: August 22, 1990 (age 36) West Palm Beach, Florida, U.S.
- Height: 1.58 m (5 ft 2 in)

Gymnastics career
- Country represented: Bangladesh
- College team: Michigan Wolverines (2009–2012)
- Head coach: Kurt Golder
Medal record
Representing Bangladesh
South Central Asian Championships
Gold medal – first place	2011 Dhaka	Parallel Bars
Silver medal – second place	2011 Dhaka	Vault
Bronze medal – third place	2011 Dhaka	All-Around
Bronze medal – third place	2011 Dhaka	Floor Exercise

Quazi Syque Caesar (born August 22, 1990) is a Bangladeshi-American gymnastics coach. A retired artistic gymnast, he represented Bangladesh at the 2012 Summer Olympics in London and was a captain of the Michigan Wolverines men's gymnastics team. He was an assistant coach for the Stanford Cardinal men's gymnastics team for over six years, was the head coach for the men's gymnastics athlete resident program at the U.S. Olympic & Paralympic Training Center until its dissolution in 2022, and is currently coaching at EVO Gymnastics.

== Early life and education ==
Caesar was born in Florida, the son of immigrants from Bangladesh. Raised in Port Saint Lucie, Florida, Caesar enrolled at the University of Michigan in 2008. He was a member of the Michigan Wolverines men's gymnastics team from 2009 to 2012. As a sophomore in 2010, he helped lead Michigan to the NCAA team championship. As a junior in 2011, he was elected co-captain of the Michigan men's gymnastic team and won the Big Ten Conference championship in the parallel bars.

== Gymnastics career ==
Caesar holds dual U.S. and Bangladesh citizenship and has represented Bangladesh in international competition. At the Central South Asian Artistic Gymnastic Championships in December 2011, Caesar competed for Bangladesh and won the parallel bars event—the first gold medal for Bangladesh in international competition. He also won the silver medal in the vault and the bronze medals in the floor event and all-around competition. He was dubbed "Golden Syque" in The Daily Star, Bangladesh's largest English-language newspaper.

In April 2012, Caesar was chosen to represent Bangladesh at the 2012 Summer Olympics in London. There he had hopes to end Bangladesh's distinction as the most populous nation never to have won a medal at the Olympic Games. Caesar's roommate and Michigan teammate, Sam Mikulak, was also chosen to compete in the 2012 Olympics, representing the United States. Caesar also competed at the 2014 Commonwealth Games.

== Coaching career ==
In late 2021, Caesar was named head coach for the men's gymnastics athlete resident program at the U.S. Olympic & Paralympic Training Center.

== Competitive history ==
Year	Event	Team	AA	FX	PH	SR	VT	PB	HB
2009	NCAA Championships	2nd place, silver medalist(s)					23	22	
2011	NCAA Championships	5						19	35
2011	World Championships		174						
2011	South Central Asian Championships		3rd place, bronze medalist(s)	3rd place, bronze medalist(s)			2nd place, silver medalist(s)	1st place, gold medalist(s)	
2012
2012	Olympic Games			29				27	50
2013	NCAA Championships	1st place, gold medalist(s)		4				2nd place, silver medalist(s)	3rd place, bronze medalist(s)
2013	World Championships							21	
2014	NCAA Championships	1st place, gold medalist(s)						3rd place, bronze medalist(s)	5
2014	Commonwealth Games		R3					R1	
2014	Asian Games							7	7
