= Shin Dong-hyen =

South Korean artistic gymnast

- Full name: Shin Dong-hyen
- Born: 23 September 1989 (age 36) Ulsan, South Korea
- Height: 1.68 m (5 ft 6 in)

Gymnastics career
- Discipline: Men's artistic gymnastics
- Country represented: South Korea; (2014)
- Club: Korea Armed Forces Athletic Corps
- Head coach: Yoon Chang-soon (윤창선)
Medal record
Representing South Korea
Asian Games
Silver medal – second place	2014 Incheon	Team

Korean name
- Hangul: 신동현
- RR: Sin Donghyeon
- MR: Sin Tonghyŏn

Shin Dong-hyen (Korean: 신동현; born September 23, 1989) is a South Korean male artistic gymnast and a member of the national team. He participated in two editions of the World Championships (2014 in Nanjing, China, and 2015 in Glasgow, Scotland). He also qualified for the 2016 Summer Olympics.
