= Lee Sang-wook =

South Korean artistic gymnast

- Full name: Lee Sang-wook
- Born: 14 October 1985 (age 40) Wonju, South Korea
- Height: 1.70 m (5 ft 7 in)

Gymnastics career
- Discipline: Men's artistic gymnastics
- Country represented: South Korea (2015)
- Club: Jeonbuk Provincial Government Office
- Head coach: Yoon Chang-soon (윤창선)
Medal record
Representing South Korea
Asian Games
Silver medal – second place	2014 Incheon	Team
Bronze medal – third place	2014 Incheon	All-around

Lee Sang-wook (Korean: 이상욱; born October 14, 1985) is a South Korean artistic gymnast and a member of the national team. He participated at the 2015 World Artistic Gymnastics Championships in Glasgow, and qualified for the 2016 Summer Olympics.
