= Masayoshi Yamamoto =

Japanese gymnast

- Born: 1990 (age 35–36) Neyagawa

Gymnastics career
- Discipline: Men's artistic gymnastics
- Country represented: Japan
- Gym: Tokushukai Gymnastics Club
Medal record
Representing Japan
Asian Games
Gold medal – first place	2014 Incheon	Team
Gold medal – first place	2014 Incheon	Pommel horse
Bronze medal – third place	2014 Incheon	Horizontal bar

Masayoshi Yamamoto (山本 雅賢, Yamamoto Masayoshi) is a Japanese artistic gymnast, representing his nation at international competitions. He won the gold medal in the pommel horse event at the 2014 Asian Games in Incheon, South Korea.
