= Huang Yuguo =

Chinese artistic gymnast

- 黄玉国
- Born: 9 March 1990 (age 36) Shandong, China

Gymnastics career
- Discipline: Men's artistic gymnastics
- Country represented: China
Medal record
Representing China
Asian Games
Silver medal – second place	2014 Incheon	Floor exercise
Bronze medal – third place	2014 Incheon	Team

Huang Yuguo (simplified Chinese: 黄玉国; traditional Chinese: 黃玉國; pinyin: Huáng Yùguó, born 9 March 1990) is a Chinese gymnast, specializing in the floor exercise and the horizontal bar. Huang participated in the 2014 Asian Games in Incheon, winning silver in the floor exercise.
