= Ashish Kumar (gymnast) =

Indian gymnast

- Full name: Ashish Kumar
- Born: November 26, 1990 (age 35) Allahabad

Gymnastics career
- Discipline: Men's artistic gymnastics
- Country represented: India
- College team: Team Futuramic
- Club: Indian Railways
- Gym: Kelgaon Public School
- Head coach: Vladimir Chertkov
- Assistant coach: Praveen Sharma
Medal record
Representing India
Asian Games
Bronze medal – third place	2010 Guangzhou	Floor exercise
Asian Championships
Bronze medal – third place	2006 Surat	Floor exercise
Commonwealth Games
Silver medal – second place	2010 Delhi	Vault
Bronze medal – third place	2010 Delhi	Floor exercise

Ashish Kumar (born 26 November 1990) is an Indian artistic gymnast from Allahabad. In 2010, he became the first Indian gymnast to win medals at the 2010 Commonwealth Games, claiming a bronze and a silver medal. This achievement made him the most successful Indian gymnast in Commonwealth Games history.

== Competitive history ==
=== 2006 ===
Kumar first participated at the 2006 Asian Artistic Gymnastics Championships staged in Surat, India. He won the bronze medal in the floor exercise, tied with Syrian Fadi Bahlawan. This was India's first major international medal in the history of artistic gymnastics. Kumar also competed at the 2006 Asian Games in Doha, Qatar. He finished 18th in the individual all-around, the only final he qualified for.

=== 2010 ===
At the 2010 Commonwealth Games he first won a bronze medal in the floor exercise and later a silver medal in vault, where the gold went to Luke Folwell of England, while Ian Galvan of Canada won the bronze medal.

At the 2010 Asian Games in Guangzhou, China, Kumar won the bronze medal in the floor exercise. As of 2017, this remains India's only medal in gymnastics at the Asian Games.

=== 2011 ===
At the South Central Asian Gymnastics Championships in Dhaka in December 2011, Kumar won four gold medals, in the individual all-around, floor exercise, vault and high bar events.

=== 2014 ===
Following a turbulent selection process which caused uncertainty about the participation of the Indian team in the gymnastics event at the 2014 Asian Games, Kumar failed to qualify to the floor finals at the event. He finished 12th in the individual all-around.
