= Rakesh Kumar Patra =

Indian artistic gymnast

- Born: 25 February 1992 (age 34)
- Height: 160 cm (5 ft 3 in)

Gymnastics career
- Discipline: Men's artistic gymnastics
- Country represented: India; (2010)
Medal record
Men's Artistic Gymnastics
Representing India
- Military career
- Allegiance: India
- Branch: Indian Navy
- Service years: 2010–Present
- Rank: Master Chief Petty Officer

Master Chief Petty Officer Rakesh Kumar Patra (born 25 February 1992) is an Indian male artistic gymnast and India's National Coach, representing his nation at international competitions. He competed 5 world championships, including 2011, 2013, 2014, 2015, 2017. 3 Asian games and 3 commonwealth games and 5 time India champion. He is supported by the GoSports Foundation through the Rahul Dravid mentorship programme. He is a Junior Commissioned Officer in the Indian Navy.

== Early life and background ==
Rakesh got into gymnastics in the year 2003 after being inspired by his uncle Suvendu Patra, a former international gymnast in 2001. Rakesh has been working in the Indian Navy since 2010. His parents are unwell and Rakesh also has a sister whom he takes care of.

== Career ==
Ranked 25th, he narrowly missed the Olympic qualification for Rio, 2016, as only the top 24 in the world qualify for the Olympics. Any country's withdrawal would have given him an entry into the games, but that did not happen. At the Asian Championships, Patra qualified for the final in the Men's Rings apparatus and finished eighth in the final. He strives for perfection and is adamant on winning a medal at Tokyo 2020. Recently, he spent 20 days on a high-performance stint in China and got the opportunity to work on his basics to improve at his sport. Rakesh looks up to five-time world champion and two-time Olympic champion, Kohei Uchimura for inspiration.

== Achievements ==
- 2018: Qualified for the ring apparatus finals at the CWG, Gold coast
- 2017: Finished 8th at the Asian Championships
- 2015: Represented India – World Championship
