= Hsu Ping-chien =

Taiwanese artistic gymnast

- Born: 8 October 1994 (age 31)

Gymnastics career
- Discipline: Men's artistic gymnastics
- Country represented: Chinese Taipei
Medal record
Representing Chinese Taipei
Asian Artistic Gymnastics Championships
Bronze medal – third place	2019 Ulaanbaatar	Team
Summer Universiade
Silver medal – second place	2019 Naples	Team

Hsu Ping-chien (Chinese: 徐秉謙; pinyin: Xú Bǐngqiān; born 8 October 1994) is a Taiwanese artistic gymnast. He competed at the Asian Games in 2010 and 2014. He also competed at the World Artistic Gymnastics Championships in 2017 and 2019.

At the 2019 Summer Universiade in Naples, Italy, he won the silver medal in the men's team all-around event. In the same year, he competed at the 2019 World Artistic Gymnastics Championships held in Stuttgart, Germany.
