= Yang Hak-seon =

South Korean artistic gymnast

Yang Hak-Seon
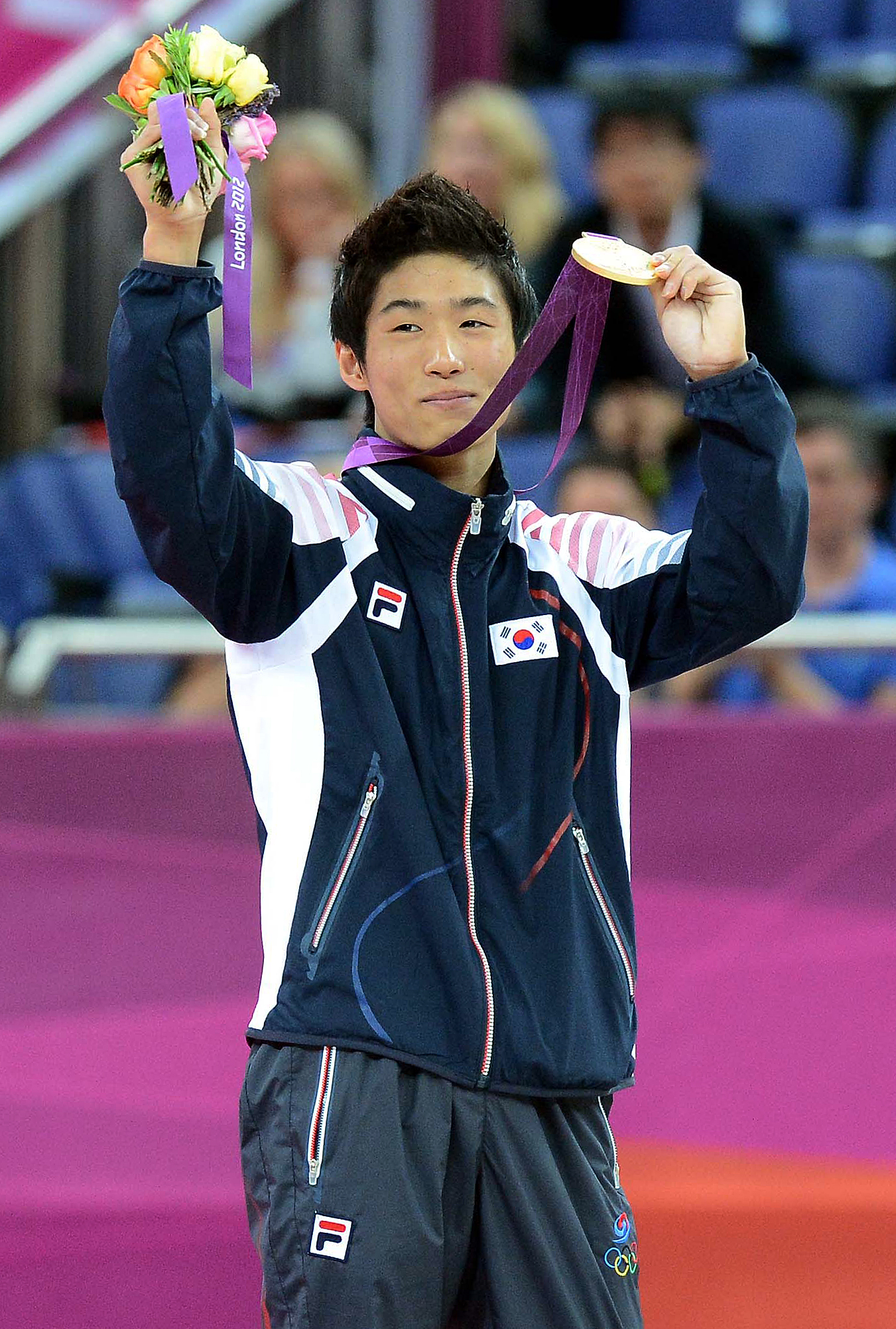
- Yang in 2012

Personal information
- Born: December 6, 1992 (age 33) Gwangju, South Korea
- Height: 1.59 m (5 ft 3 in)

Gymnastics career
- Discipline: Men's artistic gymnastics
- Country represented: South Korea
- Eponymous skills: Yang
- Retired: September 2025
Medal record
Event	1st	2nd	3rd
Olympic Games	1	0	0
World Championships	2	0	0
Asian Games	1	2	1
Summer Universiade	1	1	0
Total	5	3	1
Men's artistic gymnastics
Representing South Korea
Olympic Games
Gold medal – first place	2012 London	Vault
World Championships
Gold medal – first place	2011 Tokyo	Vault
Gold medal – first place	2013 Antwerp	Vault
Asian Games
Gold medal – first place	2010 Guangzhou	Vault
Silver medal – second place	2014 Incheon	Team
Silver medal – second place	2014 Incheon	Vault
Bronze medal – third place	2010 Guangzhou	Team
Summer Universiade
Gold medal – first place	2013 Kazan	Vault
Silver medal – second place	2015 Gwangju	Team

- Yang Hak-seon
- Hangul: 양학선
- Hanja: 梁鶴善
- RR: Yang Hakseon
- MR: Yang Haksŏn

Yang Hak-seon (Korean: 양학선; Hanja: 梁鶴善; born 6 December 1992) is a South Korean artistic gymnast who specialises in the vault. He is the first South Korean gymnast to win an Olympic gold medal.

== Personal life ==
According to his Olympic profile, Yang started his gymnastics career at the age of 9, following in his brother's footsteps.

Yang is currently attending the Korea National Sport University.

Yang's parents are Yang Gwan-gwon and Ki Suk-hyang. Their impoverished family previously lived in one of Gwangju's shantytowns, before relocating to North Jeolla Province's Gochang, in South Korea's countryside, in 2010, after his father, a construction worker, suffered from serious injuries. His family currently lives in a makeshift converted greenhouse constructed from PVC pipes. After Yang's father lost his job, Yang supported the family with a modest income from the Korea Gymnastic Association. Yang's coach Cho Sung-doe admitted that he had been unaware of the family's precarious financial situation before Yang won the gold medal.

Yang also competed on the Korean survivor game show Physical: 100 by Netflix in 2023.

== Career ==
Yang placed fourth and just missed medaling in the individual vault final at the 2010 Artistic Gymnastics World Championships in Rotterdam, The Netherlands, and would later become vault champion at the 2010 Asian Games and then 2011 Artistic Gymnastics World Championships in Tokyo, Japan. In 2012, he became the first Korean gymnast to win Olympic gold in gymnastics, winning the vault competition in London. In 2013, he won gold in vault at the 2013 Summer Universiade in Kazan, Russia. He is famous in the gymnastics world for performing one of the five hardest vaults in the world, the "Yang Hak Seon", which is a front handspring on and into three twists off in a layout position. It was unveiled in the individual vault final at the 2011 Artistic Gymnastics World Championships, and initially carried the highest ever difficulty score (D-score) of 7.4 in men's vault at the time under the 2009–2012 Code of Points (CoP). The difficulty value of the "Yang Hak Seon" has been adjusted at the beginning of subsequent quads since, initially down to 6.4 under the 2012–2016 CoP and now further to 6.0 under the current 2017–2020 CoP. The International Gymnastics Federation (FIG) regularly reassesses and adjusts D-scores (typically down) due to the steady advancement of general skill levels over time in gymnastics, especially in vault because of its D-scores being assigned numeric values instead of letter representations like with all other apparatuses—vault is the only apparatus in gymnastics to have that simply due to the nature of the apparatus. Yang is also said to be working on a difficult second vault but with a sideways entry.

Yang was a reigning world champion, having won gold in vault at both the 2011 Worlds and 2013 Artistic Gymnastics World Championships in Tokyo and Antwerp respectively. However, at the 2014 Artistic Gymnastics World Championships in Nanning, China, he fell on both of his vaults—the first for which it was announced in Nanning that he was widely expected but failed to receive naming credit for a brand new top then 6.4 difficulty vault, initially dubbed the "Yang Hak Seon 2", or a straight Tsukahara with 3½ twist—failing to defend his title and finished in seventh place with a final average combined score of 14.416 after qualifying in first place. Yang had earlier submitted to possibly attempt this new vault at the 2013 Worlds as well but chose not to compete it in any stage of the individual vault apparatus event. Ri Se Gwang of North Korea won the gold medal with two top then 6.4 difficulty vaults that were both named after him, the "Ri Se Gwang" (full-twisting double Tsukahara) and "Ri Se Gwang 2" (double front piked with ½ twist), and outscored Yang by exactly one full point (15.416). He was similarly unable to defend his Olympic title at the 2016 Summer Olympics in Rio de Janeiro due to injury. At the 2017 Artistic Gymnastics World Championships in Montreal, Canada, Yang had "qualified" (Q) in first place for the vault event final but pulled out after that because he had sustained a hamstring injury during qualifications.

At the 2019 Artistic Gymnastics World Championships in Stuttgart, Germany, Yang had qualified for the individual vault event final in first place, but finished eighth after falling out of the first vault—his own the "Yang Hak Seon" in vault, or front handspring (layout) triple twist—as well as incurring a 0.300 penalty for stepping out of bounds because of that.

Yang's training and preparation for the 2020 Summer Olympics in Tokyo, Japan, were adjusted for his performance to peak accordingly for one year due to 2019–20 COVID-19 pandemic. At the Olympics, he failed to qualify automatically for the individual event finals in vault after placing ninth in qualifying due to the poor execution and penalty point received in his second vault. He became the first reserve for the finals but ending up not competing.

In the 2021 Artistic Gymnastics World Championships in Kitakyushu, Japan, Yang qualified for the individual vault apparatus finals in a tie for the highest average combined score of 14.833 with but ranked second to Nazar Chepurnyi of Ukraine after the tie-breaking procedure was applied. However, Yang completed the event in fifth place after some weak execution on his second vault once again.

He retired from competition in September 2025.

== Competitive history ==
Year	Competition(s)	Team	Individual events						
Year	Competition(s)	Team	AA	FX	PH	SR	VT	PB	HB
Year	Competition(s)	2010							
Artistic Gymnastics World Championships		2010					4		
Asian Games		2010					1st place, gold medalist(s)		
2011							1st place, gold medalist(s)		
2011	Artistic Gymnastics World Championships						1st place, gold medalist(s)		
2012							1st place, gold medalist(s)		
2012	Summer Olympic Games						1st place, gold medalist(s)		
2013	Summer Universiade						1st place, gold medalist(s)		
2013	Artistic Gymnastics World Championships	—N/a					1st place, gold medalist(s)		
2014
2014	Artistic Gymnastics World Championships						7		
2014	Asian Games	2nd place, silver medalist(s)					2nd place, silver medalist(s)		
2015	Summer Universiade	2nd place, silver medalist(s)							
2017
2017	Artistic Gymnastics World Championships	—N/a					Q		
2019
2019	Artistic Gymnastics World Championships						8		
2021
2021	Summer Olympic Games						9		
2021	Artistic Gymnastics World Championships	—N/a					5		

== Eponymous skills ==
Apparatus	Name	Description	Difficulty	Notes
Vault	Yang Hak Seon	Front handspring layout triple twist	6.0	Originated in the vault finals at the 2011 Worlds as men's hardest vault at the time. It had a D-score of 7.4 in 2009–2012, 6.4 in 2013–2016, and 6.0 from 2017 on.
