= Wrestling at the 2014 Asian Games =

- Venue: Dowon Gymnasium
- Dates: 27 September – 1 October 2014
- Competitors: 239 from 30 nations

Wrestling was contested by men and women at the 2014 Asian Games in Dowon Gymnasium, Incheon, South Korea from September 27 - October 1, 2014.

== Schedule ==
| P | Preliminary rounds & Repechage | F | Finals |

| Event↓/Date → | 27th Sat | | 28th Sun | | 29th Mon | | 30th Tue | | 1st Wed | |
|---|---|---|---|---|---|---|---|---|---|---|
| Men's freestyle 57 kg | P | F | | | | | | | | |
| Men's freestyle 61 kg | | | | | P | F | | | | |
| Men's freestyle 65 kg | | | P | F | | | | | | |
| Men's freestyle 70 kg | P | F | | | | | | | | |
| Men's freestyle 74 kg | | | | | P | F | | | | |
| Men's freestyle 86 kg | | | | | P | F | | | | |
| Men's freestyle 97 kg | | | P | F | | | | | | |
| Men's freestyle 125 kg | | | | | P | F | | | | |
| Men's Greco-Roman 59 kg | | | | | | | P | F | | |
| Men's Greco-Roman 66 kg | | | | | | | | | P | F |
| Men's Greco-Roman 71 kg | | | | | | | P | F | | |
| Men's Greco-Roman 75 kg | | | | | | | | | P | F |
| Men's Greco-Roman 80 kg | | | | | | | P | F | | |
| Men's Greco-Roman 85 kg | | | | | | | | | P | F |
| Men's Greco-Roman 98 kg | | | | | | | P | F | | |
| Men's Greco-Roman 130 kg | | | | | | | | | P | F |
| Women's freestyle 48 kg | P | F | | | | | | | | |
| Women's freestyle 55 kg | | | P | F | | | | | | |
| Women's freestyle 63 kg | P | F | | | | | | | | |
| Women's freestyle 75 kg | | | P | F | | | | | | |

== Medalists ==
=== Men's freestyle ===
| Event | Gold | Silver | Bronze |
|---|---|---|---|
| 57 kg | Jong Hak-jin; North Korea | Rassul Kaliyev; Kazakhstan | Batboldyn Nomin; Mongolia |
| 57 kg | Jong Hak-jin; North Korea | Rassul Kaliyev; Kazakhstan | Yun Jun-sik; South Korea |
| 61 kg | Masoud Esmaeilpour; Iran | Bajrang Punia; India | Lee Seung-chul; South Korea |
| 61 kg | Masoud Esmaeilpour; Iran | Bajrang Punia; India | Noriyuki Takatsuka; Japan |
| 65 kg | Yogeshwar Dutt; India | Zalimkhan Yusupov; Tajikistan | Yeerlanbieke Katai; China |
| 65 kg | Yogeshwar Dutt; India | Zalimkhan Yusupov; Tajikistan | Ikhtiyor Navruzov; Uzbekistan |
| 70 kg | Bekzod Abdurakhmonov; Uzbekistan | Oh Man-ho; South Korea | Elaman Dogdurbek Uulu; Kyrgyzstan |
| 70 kg | Bekzod Abdurakhmonov; Uzbekistan | Oh Man-ho; South Korea | Takafumi Kojima; Japan |
| 74 kg | Rashid Kurbanov; Uzbekistan | Ezzatollah Akbari; Iran | Lee Sang-kyu; South Korea |
| 74 kg | Rashid Kurbanov; Uzbekistan | Ezzatollah Akbari; Iran | Narsingh Yadav; India |
| 86 kg | Meisam Mostafa-Jokar; Iran | Yesbolat Nurzhumbayev; Kazakhstan | Umidjon Ismanov; Uzbekistan |
| 86 kg | Meisam Mostafa-Jokar; Iran | Yesbolat Nurzhumbayev; Kazakhstan | Kim Gwan-uk; South Korea |
| 97 kg | Reza Yazdani; Iran | Magomed Musaev; Kyrgyzstan | Dorjkhandyn Khüderbulga; Mongolia |
| 97 kg | Reza Yazdani; Iran | Magomed Musaev; Kyrgyzstan | Mamed Ibragimov; Kazakhstan |
| 125 kg | Parviz Hadi; Iran | Daulet Shabanbay; Kazakhstan | Nobuyoshi Arakida; Japan |
| 125 kg | Parviz Hadi; Iran | Daulet Shabanbay; Kazakhstan | Nam Kyung-jin; South Korea |

=== Men's Greco-Roman ===
| Event | Gold | Silver | Bronze |
|---|---|---|---|
| 59 kg | Kohei Hasegawa; Japan | Yun Won-chol; North Korea | Tian Qiye; China |
| 59 kg | Kohei Hasegawa; Japan | Yun Won-chol; North Korea | Almat Kebispayev; Kazakhstan |
| 66 kg | Ryu Han-su; South Korea | Ryutaro Matsumoto; Japan | Ri Hak-won; North Korea |
| 66 kg | Ryu Han-su; South Korea | Ryutaro Matsumoto; Japan | Afshin Biabangard; Iran |
| 71 kg | Jung Ji-hyun; South Korea | Dilshod Turdiev; Uzbekistan | Saeid Abdevali; Iran |
| 71 kg | Jung Ji-hyun; South Korea | Dilshod Turdiev; Uzbekistan | Şermet Permanow; Turkmenistan |
| 75 kg | Kim Hyeon-woo; South Korea | Takehiro Kanakubo; Japan | Doszhan Kartikov; Kazakhstan |
| 75 kg | Kim Hyeon-woo; South Korea | Takehiro Kanakubo; Japan | Payam Boveiri; Iran |
| 80 kg | Habibollah Akhlaghi; Iran | Tsukasa Tsurumaki; Japan | Besiki Saldadze; Uzbekistan |
| 80 kg | Habibollah Akhlaghi; Iran | Tsukasa Tsurumaki; Japan | Janarbek Kenjeev; Kyrgyzstan |
| 85 kg | Rustam Assakalov; Uzbekistan | Lee Se-yeol; South Korea | Peng Fei; China |
| 85 kg | Rustam Assakalov; Uzbekistan | Lee Se-yeol; South Korea | Mojtaba Karimfar; Iran |
| 98 kg | Mehdi Aliyari; Iran | Xiao Di; China | Yerulan Iskakov; Kazakhstan |
| 98 kg | Mehdi Aliyari; Iran | Xiao Di; China | Norikatsu Saikawa; Japan |
| 130 kg | Nurmakhan Tinaliyev; Kazakhstan | Kim Yong-min; South Korea | Meng Qiang; China |
| 130 kg | Nurmakhan Tinaliyev; Kazakhstan | Kim Yong-min; South Korea | Bashir Babajanzadeh; Iran |

=== Women's freestyle ===
| Event | Gold | Silver | Bronze |
|---|---|---|---|
| 48 kg | Eri Tosaka; Japan | Sun Yanan; China | Tatyana Amanzhol; Kazakhstan |
| 48 kg | Eri Tosaka; Japan | Sun Yanan; China | Vinesh Phogat; India |
| 55 kg | Saori Yoshida; Japan | Sündeviin Byambatseren; Mongolia | Aisuluu Tynybekova; Kyrgyzstan |
| 55 kg | Saori Yoshida; Japan | Sündeviin Byambatseren; Mongolia | Zhong Xuechun; China |
| 63 kg | Rio Watari; Japan | Xiluo Zhuoma; China | Sükheegiin Tserenchimed; Mongolia |
| 63 kg | Rio Watari; Japan | Xiluo Zhuoma; China | Geetika Jakhar; India |
| 75 kg | Zhou Feng; China | Guzel Manyurova; Kazakhstan | Hwang Eun-ju; South Korea |
| 75 kg | Zhou Feng; China | Guzel Manyurova; Kazakhstan | Ochirbatyn Burmaa; Mongolia |

== Medal table ==
| Rank | Nation | Gold | Silver | Bronze | Total |
|---|---|---|---|---|---|
| 1 | Iran (IRI) | 6 | 1 | 5 | 12 |
| 2 | Japan (JPN) | 4 | 3 | 4 | 11 |
| 3 | South Korea (KOR) | 3 | 3 | 6 | 12 |
| 4 | Uzbekistan (UZB) | 3 | 1 | 3 | 7 |
| 5 | Kazakhstan (KAZ) | 1 | 4 | 5 | 10 |
| 6 | China (CHN) | 1 | 3 | 5 | 9 |
| 7 | India (IND) | 1 | 1 | 3 | 5 |
| 8 | North Korea (PRK) | 1 | 1 | 1 | 3 |
| 9 | Mongolia (MGL) | 0 | 1 | 4 | 5 |
| 10 | Kyrgyzstan (KGZ) | 0 | 1 | 3 | 4 |
| 11 | Tajikistan (TJK) | 0 | 1 | 0 | 1 |
| 12 | Turkmenistan (TKM) | 0 | 0 | 1 | 1 |
| Totals (12 entries) | | 20 | 20 | 40 | 80 |

== Participating nations ==
A total of 239 athletes from 30 nations competed in wrestling at the 2014 Asian Games:

- Cambodia (4)
- China (18)
- Chinese Taipei (2)
- India (18)
- Indonesia (2)
- Iran (14)
- Iraq (5)
- Japan (18)
- Jordan (4)
- Kazakhstan (18)
- Kyrgyzstan (15)
- Laos (4)
- Mongolia (12)
- Myanmar (6)
- Nepal (2)
- North Korea (9)
- Pakistan (4)
- Palestine (2)
- Philippines (2)
- Qatar (4)
- Saudi Arabia (3)
- South Korea (18)
- Sri Lanka (1)
- Syria (5)
- Tajikistan (11)
- Thailand (5)
- Turkmenistan (12)
- Uzbekistan (15)
- Vietnam (3)
- Yemen (3)
