= Kyrgyzstan at the 2014 Asian Games =

- IOC code: KGZ
- NOC: National Olympic Committee of the Republic of Kyrgyzstan

in Incheon
- Flag bearer: Bolot Toktogonov
- Medals Ranked 29th: Gold 0 Silver 2 Bronze 4 Total 6

Asian Games appearances (overview)
- 1994; 1998; 2002; 2006; 2010; 2014; 2018; 2022; 2026

Kyrgyzstan participated in the 2014 Asian Games in Incheon, South Korea from 19 September to 4 October 2014.

== Medal summary ==
=== Medalists ===
Medal	Name	Sport	Event
Silver	Evgeny Vakker	Cycling	Men's individual time trial
Silver	Magomed Musaev	Wrestling	Men's freestyle 97 kg
Bronze	Turat Osmonov	Boxing	Men's 49 kg
Bronze	Elaman Dogdurbek Uulu	Wrestling	Men's freestyle 70 kg
Bronze	Janarbek Kenjeev	Wrestling	Men's Greco-Roman 80 kg
Bronze	Aisuluu Tynybekova	Wrestling	Women's freestyle 55 kg

== Archery ==
Men's recurve

Athlete	Event	Ranking Round			Round of 64	Round of 32	Round of 16	Quarterfinals	Semifinals	Final/BM	Rank
Athlete	Event	Score	Rank	Seed	Opposition Score	Opposition Score	Opposition Score	Opposition Score	Opposition Score	Opposition Score	Rank
Kylychbek Nurmanbetov	Individual	1015	67 Q	40	Duangsuwan (THA); L 0 – 6	Did not advance					

Women's recurve

Athlete	Event	Ranking Round			Round of 32	Round of 16	Quarterfinals	Semifinals	Final/BM	Rank
Athlete	Event	Score	Rank	Seed	Opposition Score	Opposition Score	Opposition Score	Opposition Score	Opposition Score	Rank
Asel Sharbekova	Individual	1236	40 Q	23	Majhi (IND); L 0 – 6	Did not advance				

== Athletics ==
Men's

Athlete	Event	Round 1			Final	
Athlete	Event	Heat	Time	Rank	Time	Rank
Nurgazy Asankulov	800 m	2	1:57.40	20	Did not advance	
Almazbek Kazibekov	800 m	3	1:55.90	18	Did not advance	
Almazbek Kazibekov	1500 m	1	4:01.20	16	Did not advance	
Adilet Kyshtakbekov	1500 m	2	3:55.40 PB	11 Q	3:54.30 PB	10

Women

Athlete	Event	Round 1			Final	
Athlete	Event	Heat	Time	Rank	Time	Rank
Gulshanoi Satarova	800 m	1	2:12.25	12	Did not advance	
Gulshanoi Satarova	1500 m				4:24.16	7
Ksenia Faiskanova	800 m	2	2:11.62	11	Did not advance	
Viktoriia Poliudina	1500 m				4:32.07	10
Daria Maslova	5000 m				15:47.17 PB	9
Iuliia Andreeva	Marathon				2:39:25	10

== Boxing ==
Men

Athlete	Event	Round of 32	Round of 16	Quarterfinal	Semifinal	Final	Rank
Turat Osmonov	49 kg	Bye	Ali (IRQ); W 3-0	Gan-Erdene (MGL); W 3-0	Zhakypov (KAZ); L 0-3	Did not advance	3rd place, bronze medalist(s)
Azat Usenaliev	52 kg	Bye	Raad (IRQ); W 3-0	Waseem (PAK); L TKOI	Did not advance		5
Omurbek Malabekov	52 kg	Bye	Li (TPE); W 3-0	Zhang (CHN); L 1-2	Did not advance		5
Akzhol Sulaimanbek Uulu	60 kg	Bye	Eryan (PLE); W WO	Otgondalai (MGL); L 0-3	Did not advance		5
Ermek Sakenov	64 kg	Bye	Amirzakov (KAZ); W 2-1	Lim (KOR); L 0-3	Did not advance		5
Erkinbek Bolotbek Uulu	69 kg	Thinley (BHU); W 3-0	Suzuki (JPN); L 0-3	Did not advance			9
Azamat Kanybek Uulu	75 kg	Bye	Yadav (IND); L 0-3	Did not advance			9
Sergei Parenko	91 kg		Pinchuk (KAZ); L 0-3	Did not advance			9

== Canoeing ==
=== Slalom ===
Men

Athlete	Event	Heats		Repechage		Last 16		Quarterfinal	Semifinal	Final	Rank
Athlete	Event	Time	Rank	Time	Rank	Time	Rank	Quarterfinal	Semifinal	Final	Rank
Ivan Snopkov	K1	1:17.05	16	1:16.14	8 Q	1:14.08	15	Did not advance			15

=== Sprint ===
Men

Athlete	Event	Heat			Semifinal		Final		Rank
Athlete	Event	Heat	Time	Rank	Time	Rank	Time	Rank	Rank
Aleksandr Parol	K1 1000 m	1	4:08.449	5 QS	3:57.204	2 Q	4:02.380	9	9
Maksim Bondar; Igor Dorofeev	K2 200 m	2	32.267	2 QF			33.297	5	5
Maksim Bondar; Igor Dorofeev	K2 1000 m	1	3:47.810	6 QS	3:46.334	6	Did not advance		12
Aleksandr Parol; Daniil Teterev; Ruslan Saifulin; Artem Teterev	K4 1000 m	1	3:16.942	5 QS	3:16.286	4	Did not advance		10

Women

Athlete	Event	Heat			Semifinal		Final		Rank
Athlete	Event	Heat	Time	Rank	Time	Rank	Time	Rank	Rank
Elena Rybalova	K1 200 m	1	46.007	5 QS	47.438	5	Did not advance		11
Elena Rybalova	K1 500 m	1	2:11.870	4 QS	2:08.210	4	Did not advance		10

== Cycling ==
=== Road ===
Men

Athlete	Event	Time	Rank
Evgeny Vakker	Road race	-	DNF
Evgeny Vakker	Time trial	51:01.69	2nd place, silver medalist(s)

== Fencing ==
Men

Event	Athlete	Round of Poules		Round of 32	Round of 16	Quarterfinals	Semifinals	Final	Rank
Event	Athlete	Result	Seed	Opposition Score	Opposition Score	Opposition Score	Opposition Score	Opposition Score	Rank
Roman Petrov	Individual épée	5 W - 1 L Q	4	Bye	Kudayev (UZB); W 15-12	Park (KOR); L 10-15	Did not advance		5
Mikhail Ivanov	Individual épée	2 W - 4 L Q	24	Zhang (CHN); L 9-15	Did not advance				24
Aleksandr Chernykh; Mikhail Ivanov; Evgeny Naumkin; Roman Petrov	Team épée				Uzbekistan; W 45-39	South Korea; L 38-43	Did not advance		9

== Football ==
Men

Squad list	Preliminary round		Round of 16	Quarterfinals	Semifinal	Final	Rank
Squad list	Group F	Rank	Round of 16	Quarterfinals	Semifinal	Final	Rank
Kalysbek Akimaliev; Kairat Kolbaev; Cholponbek Esenkul Uulu; Sanzhar Sharsheev; Azamat Baymatov; Aziz Sydykov; Farkhat Musabekov; Avazbek Otkeev; Nurkal Sataev; Mirbek Kudaiberdiev; Murolimzhon Akhmedov; Kairat Zhyrgalbek Uulu; Valery Kashuba; Evgenii Doroginski; Marat Adzhiniiazov; Bekmyrza Duvanaev; Manas Karipov; Valery Kichin; Akramzhon Umarov; Maksim Zinchenko	Iran; D 1-1	2 Q	Jordan; L 0-2 aet	Did not advance			16
Kalysbek Akimaliev; Kairat Kolbaev; Cholponbek Esenkul Uulu; Sanzhar Sharsheev; Azamat Baymatov; Aziz Sydykov; Farkhat Musabekov; Avazbek Otkeev; Nurkal Sataev; Mirbek Kudaiberdiev; Murolimzhon Akhmedov; Kairat Zhyrgalbek Uulu; Valery Kashuba; Evgenii Doroginski; Marat Adzhiniiazov; Bekmyrza Duvanaev; Manas Karipov; Valery Kichin; Akramzhon Umarov; Maksim Zinchenko	Vietnam; L 0-1	2 Q	Jordan; L 0-2 aet	Did not advance			16

== Golf ==
Men

Athlete	Event	Round 1	Round 2	Round 3	Round 4	Total	Par	Rank
Aidarali Asanov	Individual	95	92	91	101	379	+91	79

== Gymnastics ==
=== Rhythmic gymnastics ===
Individual Qualification

Athlete	Apparatus				Individual All-around	
Athlete	Hoop	Ball	Clubs	Ribbon	Total	Rank
Saltanat Kiiazova	12.300	~~10.950~~	12.750	12.416	37.466 Q	13
Firuza Sadykova	11.166	10.066	10.450	~~10.000~~	31.682 Q	16

Individual all-around

Athlete	Final					
Athlete	Rope	Hoop	Clubs	Ribbon	Total	Rank
Saltanat Kiiazova	11.600	9.700	12.866	12.066	46.232	15
Firuza Sadykova	10.033	10.216	11.416	9.866	41.531	16

== Judo ==
Men

Athlete	Event	Elimination round of 32	Elimination round of 16	Quarterfinal	Semifinal	Final	Rank
Argen Bakytbek Uulu	60 kg	Sithisane (LAO); L 000–100	Did not advance				17
Bolot Toktogonov	100 kg		Al-Busiri (KUW); W 100-000	Sayidov (UZB); L 000-110	Repechage; Cho (KOR); L 010-011	Did not advance	7
Iurii Krakovetskii	+100 kg		Bye	Abdurakhmonov (TJK); W 110–000	Ojitani (JPN); L 000–100	3rd place match Tangriev (UZB); L 000–100	5

Women

Athlete	Event	Elimination round of 16	Quarterfinal	Semifinal	Final	Rank
Aikanysh Amanova	48 kg	Kim (PRK); L 000–110	Did not advance			9
Kseniia Beldiagina	52 kg	Babamuratowa (TKM); L 000–100	Did not advance			9
Meerim Momunova	57 kg	Zhou (CHN); L 000–010	Did not advance			9
Gulzhaz Saiimova	63 kg	Urdabayeva (KAZ); L 000–100	Did not advance			9
Aizhan Kadyrbekova	70 kg	Chammas (LIB); W 100–010	Kim (KOR); L 000–101	Repechage; Matniyazova (UZB); L 000-100	Did not advance	7
Nagira Sarbashova	+78 kg	Khin (MYA); W 100–000	Ma (CHN); L 000–111	Repechage; Kaur (IND); W 111-000	3rd place match Kim (KOR); L 002–103	5

== Karate ==
Men's kumite

Athlete	Event	1/16 final	1/8 final	Quarterfinal	Semifinal	Final	Rank
Urmatbek Abdilaev	60 kg	Fayzullaev (UZB); L 1-4	Did not advance				17
Bakai Duisheev	67 kg	Shinohara (JPN); L 0-1		Repechage 1 Kim (KOR); L 2-7	Did not advance		9
Gianzhali Abasov	75 kg		Hồ (VIE); L 3-5	Did not advance			9
Adilet Shadykanov	84 kg		Bye	Salim (INA); L 3-4	Did not advance		7

Women's kumite

Athlete	Event	1/16 final	1/8 final	Quarterfinal	Semifinal	Final	Rank
Vanessa Taalaibek Kyzy	Individual kata		Nguyễn (VIE); L 0–5		Repechage; Kang (PRK); L 2–3	Did not advance	7
Elnura Kamchybekova	50 kg	Bye	Khupovets (KAZ); L 3–3	Bye	Repechage; Akbar (PAK); W 4-1	3rd place match Dousti (IRI); L 1–6	5
Aigerim Prieva	55 kg		Ahn (KOR); L 1–3	Did not advance			9

== Modern pentathlon ==
Men

Athlete	Event	Fencing (épée one touch)			Swimming (200 m freestyle)			Riding (show jumping)			Combined: shooting/running (10 m air pistol/3000 m)			Total points	Final rank
Athlete	Event	Results	Rank	MP points	Time	Rank	MP points	Time	Rank	MP points	Time	Rank	MP points	Total points	Final rank
Temirlan Aitimbetov	Individual	27V - 15D	3	240	2:11.13	16	307	1:08.58	2	295	12:22.42	14	558	1400	6
Daniiar Baktybekov	Individual	17V - 25D	18	190	2:13.06	17	301	1:17.80	15	258	12:19.19	12	561	1310	16
Tilek Talaibekov	Individual	16V - 26D	20	185	2:22.83	22	272	59.79	10	279	12:24.08	16	556	1292	17
Nikita Kuznetsov	Individual	20V - 22D	13	205	2:15.90	19	293	EL	—	0	12:53.27	20	527	1025	22
Temirlan Aitimbetov; Daniiar Baktybekov; Nikita Kuznetsov; Tilek Talaibekov	Team	820			1173			832			2202			5027	5

Women

Athlete	Event	Fencing (épée one touch)			Swimming (200 m freestyle)			Riding (show jumping)			Combined: shooting/running (10 m air pistol/3000 m)			Total points	Final rank
Athlete	Event	Results	Rank	MP points	Time	Rank	MP points	Time	Rank	MP points	Time	Rank	MP points	Total points	Final rank
Alina Meremianina	Individual	5V - 35D	19	135	2:47.53	21	198	DNS	—	0	16:17.65	17	323	656	17
Ekaterina Niiazova	Individual	12V - 28D	17	170	2:39.53	18	222	EL	—	0	17:21.51	19	259	651	18
Alina Singkh	Individual	4V - 36D	21	130	2:46.46	20	201	EL	—	0	16:57.93	18	283	614	19
Violetta Pogiba	Individual	5V - 35D	19	135	2:34.99	16	236	EL	—	0	DNS	—	0	371	21
Alina Meremianina; Ekaterina Niiazova; Violetta Pogiba; Alina Singkh	Team	570			857			0			865			2292	5

== Shooting ==
Men

Athlete	Event	Qualification		Final	
Athlete	Event	Points	Rank	Points	Rank
Ruslan Ismailov	10 m air rifle	617.5	23	Did not advance	
Ruslan Ismailov	50 m rifle prone	598.6	49	Did not advance	
Ruslan Ismailov	50 m air rifle 3 positions	1130-30x	35	Did not advance	

Women

Athlete	Event	Qualification		Final	
Athlete	Event	Points	Rank	Points	Rank
Sabina Krupnova	50 m rifle prone			610.5	30
Sabina Krupnova	50 m air rifle 3 positions	568-13x	30	Did not advance	

== Swimming ==
Women

Athlete	Event	Heats		Final	
Athlete	Event	Time	Rank	Time	Rank
Dariya Talanova	50 m breaststroke	33.68	12	Did not advance	
Dariya Talanova	100 m breaststroke	1:11.62	8	1:12.28	8
Dariya Talanova	200 m breaststroke	2:38.20	10	Did not advance	

== Taekwondo ==
Men

Athlete	Event	1/16 final	1/8 final	Quarterfinal	Semifinal	Final	Rank
Ulukbek Murataliev	54 kg	Bye	Dorji (BHU); W 10-13 P	Sawekwiharee (THA); L 6-19	Did not advance		5
Almaz Toktomatov	58 kg	Wei (TPE); L 0-9 R	Did not advance				17
Klimentii Kim	63 kg	Abasi (AFG); L 4-7	Did not advance				17
Argen Tashanov	68 kg	Tangjai (THA); L 6-24 S	Did not advance				17
Akbar Aitakhunov	74 kg	Bye	Phommavanh (LAO); W 11-9	Morrison (PHI); L 6-19	Did not advance		5

== Tennis ==
Men

Athlete	Event	Round 1	Round 2	Round 3	Quarter Final	Semi Final	Final	Rank
Athlete	Event	Opposition Result	Opposition Result	Opposition Result	Opposition Result	Opposition Result	Opposition Result	Rank
Georgii Kotliarevskii	Singles	Bye	Udomchoke (THA); L 0-2; 0-6 1-6	Did not advance				17
Daniiar Duldaev	Singles	Bye	Samneang (CAM); W 2-0; 6-1 6-1	Sugita (JPN); L 1-2; 0-6 7-6(4) 1-6	Did not advance			9
Daniiar Duldaev; Georgii Kotliarevskii	Doubles		Isaro (THA); Kadchapanan (THA); L W/O	Did not advance				17
Daniiar Duldaev; Georgii Kotliarevskii	Team		Bye	(Japan); Japan; L 0–3	Did not advance			9

Women

Athlete	Event	Round 1	Round 2	Round 3	Quarter Final	Semi Final	Final	Rank
Athlete	Event	Opposition Result	Opposition Result	Opposition Result	Opposition Result	Opposition Result	Opposition Result	Rank
Ksenia Palkina	Singles	Bye	Wang (CHN); L 0-2; 4-6 0-6	Did not advance				17
Arina Beliaeva	Singles	Bye	Duan (CHN); L 0-2; 1-6 0-6	Did not advance				17

Mixed Doubles

Athlete	Event	Round 1	Quarter Final	Semi Final	Final	Rank
Athlete	Event	Opposition Result	Opposition Result	Opposition Result	Opposition Result	Rank
Daniiar Duldaev; Ksenia Palkina	Mixed doubles	Wu (CHN); Zheng (CHN); L 0-2; 0-6 2-6	Did not advance			9
Georgii Kotliarevskii; Arina Beliaeva	Mixed doubles	Fayziev (UZB); Sharipova (UZB); L 0-2; 5-7 4-6	Did not advance			9

== Weightlifting ==
Men

Athlete	Event	Snatch	Clean & jerk	Total	Rank
Bekzat Osmonaliev	62 kg	121	150	271	13
Izzat Artykov	69 kg	140	175	315	5

Women

Athlete	Event	Snatch	Clean & jerk	Total	Rank
Zhanyl Okoeva	48 kg	75	101	176	6

== Wrestling ==
Men's freestyle

Athlete	Event	1/8 final	Quarterfinal	Semifinal	Final	Rank
Samat Nadyrbek Uulu	57 kg	Rahimi (IRI); L 0–10	Did not advance			13
Ulan Nadyrbek Uulu	61 kg	Bye	Niyazbekov (KAZ); L 0-3	Did not advance		14
Ulukman Mamatov	65 kg	Yusupov (TJK); L 3-4		Repechage match Navruzov (UZB); L 0–10	Did not advance	8
Elaman Dogdurbek Uulu	70 kg	Bye	Oh (KOR); L 2–7	Repechage match Bye	3rd place match Jang (PRK); W 6-0	3rd place, bronze medalist(s)
Innokenti Innokentev	74 kg	Shimada (JPN); L 3-4	Did not advance			10
Magomed Musaev	97 kg	Awan (PAK); W 10-0	Kadian (IND); W 3-2	Ibragimov (KAZ); W 6-2	Yazdani (IRI); L 4-14	2nd place, silver medalist(s)
Aiaal Lazarev	125 kg	Bye	Nam (KOR); L 0-3	Did not advance		9

Men's Greco-Roman

Athlete	Event	1/8 final	Quarterfinal	Semifinal	Final	Rank
Kanybek Zholchubekov	59 kg	Al-Yamani (YEM); W 10-0	Kim (KOR); L 0-1	Did not advance		7
Ruslan Tsarev	66 kg	Biabangard (IRI); L 0-8	Did not advance			10
Esengeldi Kozhobek Uulu	71 kg	Yaseen (IRQ)} W 5^{F}-2	Fujimura (JPN)} L 0-4	Did not advance		7
Samat Shirdakov	75 kg	Bye	Kim (KOR); L 0-3	Repechage match Bye	3rd place match Kartikov (KAZ); L 0-2	5
Janarbek Kenjeev	80 kg		Chen (CHN); W 4^{F}-0	Tsurumaki (JPN); L 2-4	3rd place match Al-Quhali (YEM); W 4^{R}-0	3rd place, bronze medalist(s)
Azat Beishebekov	85 kg	Esenow (TKM); W 4–0	Balabal (PHI); W 11–2	Lee (KOR); L 0–3	3rd place match Karimfar (IRI); L 0-3	5
Murat Ramonov	130 kg	Bye	Tuychiev (TJK); W 1–0	Tinaliyev (KAZ); L 1-5	3rd place match Babajanzadeh (IRI); L 1–4	5

Women's freestyle

Athlete	Event	1/8 final	Quarterfinal	Semifinal	Final	Rank
Aisuluu Tynybekova	55 kg	Bye	Byambatseren (MGL); L 4-4	Repechage match Bye	3rd place match Jong (PRK); W 5^{F}-1	3rd place, bronze medalist(s)

== Wushu ==
Men's sanda

Athlete	Event	Round of 16	Quarterfinal	Semifinal	Final	Rank
Rustam Ibragimov	60 kg	Kong (CHN); L 0-2	Did not advance			9
Subanbek Bozhoev	65 kg	Tamang (NEP); W 2–1	Mohammadseifi (IRI); L 0–2	Did not advance		5
Nurlanbek Mamataliev	70 kg	Bye	Shah (PAK); L 0–2	Did not advance		5
Ulugbek Toshmatov	75 kg	Tursynkulov (KAZ); L 0–2	Did not advance			9

Men's taolu

Athlete	Event	Daoshu		Gunshu		Total	
Athlete	Event	Score	Rank	Score	Rank	Score	Rank
Almaz Toichuev	Daoshu/Gunshu	8.64	8	8.84	6	17.48	6

Women's sanda

Athlete	Event	Round of 16	Quarterfinal	Semifinal	Final	Rank
Albina Mambetova	52 kg	Moazzam (PAK); W 2–0	Zhang (CHN); L 0–2	Did not advance		5
