= Canoeing at the 2014 Asian Games – Men's K-1 200 metres =

Men's K-1 200 metres at the 2014 Asian Games
- Venue: Misari Regatta
- Date: 27–29 September 2014
- Competitors: 14 from 14 nations

Medalists
gold medal	Cho Gwang-hee	South Korea
silver medal	Ernest Irnazarov	Uzbekistan
bronze medal	Seiji Komatsu	Japan

The men's K-1 200 metres sprint canoeing competition at the 2014 Asian Games in Hanam was held from 27 to 29 September at the Misari Canoe/Kayak Center.

== Schedule ==
All times are Korea Standard Time (UTC+09:00)

Date	Time	Event
Saturday, 27 September 2014	14:10	Heats
Sunday, 28 September 2014	13:30	Semifinal
Monday, 29 September 2014	15:05	Final

== Results ==
=== Heats ===
- Qualification: 1–3 → Final (QF), Rest → Semifinal (QS)

==== Heat 1 ====
Rank	Athlete	Time	Notes
1	Ernest Irnazarov (UZB)	34.811	QF
2	Seiji Komatsu (JPN)	34.853	QF
3	Mervyn Toh (SIN)	34.900	QF
4	Ahmed Sameer (IRQ)	34.939	QS
5	Zhang Hongpeng (CHN)	36.311	QS
6	Lin Ya-she (TPE)	38.243	QS
7	Abdusattor Gafurov (TJK)	38.274	QS
8	Chong Hio Man (MAC)	43.374	QS

==== Heat 2 ====
Rank	Athlete	Time	Notes
1	Cho Gwang-hee (KOR)	34.297	QF
2	Ruslan Moltaev (KGZ)	35.263	QF
3	Alireza Alimohammadi (IRI)	35.341	QF
4	Andri Sugiarto (INA)	36.061	QS
5	Nathaworn Waenphrom (THA)	37.005	QS
6	Ramesh Golli (IND)	37.827	QS

=== Semifinal ===
- Qualification: 1–3 → Final (QF)

Rank	Athlete	Time	Notes
1	Zhang Hongpeng (CHN)	37.611	QF
2	Ahmed Sameer (IRQ)	37.634	QF
3	Andri Sugiarto (INA)	37.850	QF
4	Nathaworn Waenphrom (THA)	38.552	
5	Lin Ya-she (TPE)	40.167	
6	Ramesh Golli (IND)	40.324	
7	Abdusattor Gafurov (TJK)	40.407	
8	Chong Hio Man (MAC)	45.611	

=== Final ===
Rank	Athlete	Time
1st place, gold medalist(s)	Cho Gwang-hee (KOR)	35.464
2nd place, silver medalist(s)	Ernest Irnazarov (UZB)	36.531
3rd place, bronze medalist(s)	Seiji Komatsu (JPN)	36.754
4	Alireza Alimohammadi (IRI)	36.809
5	Zhang Hongpeng (CHN)	37.155
6	Ruslan Moltaev (KGZ)	37.205
7	Mervyn Toh (SIN)	37.350
8	Ahmed Sameer (IRQ)	37.410
9	Andri Sugiarto (INA)	38.086
