= Judo at the 2014 Asian Games – Women's 48 kg =

Judo competition

Women's 48 kg at the 2014 Asian Games
- Venue: Dowon Gymnasium
- Date: 20 September 2014
- Competitors: 15 from 15 nations

Medalists
gold medal	Mönkhbatyn Urantsetseg	Mongolia
silver medal	Emi Yamagishi	Japan
bronze medal	Kim Sol-mi	North Korea
bronze medal	Jeong Bo-kyeong	South Korea

The women's 48 kilograms (Extra lightweight) competition at the 2014 Asian Games in Incheon was held on 20 September at the Dowon Gymnasium.

Mönkhbatyn Urantsetseg of Mongolia won the gold medal.

== Schedule ==
All times are Korea Standard Time (UTC+09:00)

Date	Time	Event
Saturday, 20 September 2014	14:00	Elimination round of 16
Saturday, 20 September 2014	14:00	Quarterfinals
Saturday, 20 September 2014	14:00	Semifinals
Saturday, 20 September 2014	14:00	Final of repechage
Saturday, 20 September 2014	19:00	Finals

== Results ==
=== Main bracket ===
Elimination round of 16
Văn Ngọc Tú (VIE)	101
Sel Wee (MYA)	000
Jeong Bo-kyeong (KOR)	110
Leong Siu Pou (MAC)	000
Kim Sol-mi (PRK)	110
Aikanysh Amanova (KGZ)	000
Emi Yamagishi (JPN)	100
Orn-areeya Konngoen (THA)	000
Mukaddas Kubeeva (UZB)	000
Shushila Devi Likmabam (IND)	001
Wu Shugen (CHN)	002
Hsu Wan-chu (TPE)	000
Aigul Baikuleva (KAZ)	101
Sonnapha Phimphanthavong (LAO)	000

Quarterfinals
Mönkhbatyn Urantsetseg (MGL)	100
Văn Ngọc Tú (VIE)	000
Jeong Bo-kyeong (KOR)	002
Kim Sol-mi (PRK)	000
Emi Yamagishi (JPN)	100
Shushila Devi Likmabam (IND)	000
Wu Shugen (CHN)	000
Aigul Baikuleva (KAZ)	001

Semifinals
Mönkhbatyn Urantsetseg (MGL)	100
Jeong Bo-kyeong (KOR)	010
Emi Yamagishi (JPN)	100
Aigul Baikuleva (KAZ)	010

Gold medal contest
Mönkhbatyn Urantsetseg (MGL)	010
Emi Yamagishi (JPN)	000

=== Repechage ===
Final of repechage
Văn Ngọc Tú (VIE)	010
Kim Sol-mi (PRK)	011
Shushila Devi Likmabam (IND)	000
Wu Shugen (CHN)	100

Bronze medal contests
Kim Sol-mi (PRK)	100
Aigul Baikuleva (KAZ)	000
Wu Shugen (CHN)	000
Jeong Bo-kyeong (KOR)	000
