= Wrestling at the 2014 Asian Games – Men's Greco-Roman 75 kg =

Men's Greco-Roman 75 kg at the 2014 Asian Games
- Venue: Dowon Gymnasium
- Date: 1 October 2014
- Competitors: 10 from 10 nations

Medalists
gold medal	Kim Hyeon-woo	South Korea
silver medal	Takehiro Kanakubo	Japan
bronze medal	Doszhan Kartikov	Kazakhstan
bronze medal	Payam Boveiri	Iran

The men's Greco-Roman 75 kilograms wrestling competition at the 2014 Asian Games in Incheon was held on 1 October 2014 at the Dowon Gymnasium.

== Schedule ==
All times are Korea Standard Time (UTC+09:00)

Date	Time	Event
Wednesday, 1 October 2014	13:00	1/8 finals
Wednesday, 1 October 2014	13:00	Quarterfinals
Wednesday, 1 October 2014	13:00	Semifinals
Wednesday, 1 October 2014	13:00	Repechages
Wednesday, 1 October 2014	19:00	Finals

== Results ==
Legend

- C — Won by 3 cautions given to the opponent
- F — Won by fall

=== Main bracket ===
1/8 finals
Kusno Hadi Saputra (INA)	14
Atthaphol Sirithahan (THA)	4
Takehiro Kanakubo (JPN)	5
Amanaly Ataýew (TKM)	1
Payam Boveiri (IRI)	9
Nurbek Khashimbekov (UZB)	5
Bakhit Sharif Badr (QAT)	0
Gurpreet Singh (IND)	10

Quarterfinals
Kim Hyeon-woo (KOR)	3
Samat Shirdakov (KGZ)	0
Yang Bin (CHN)	0
Doszhan Kartikov (KAZ)	8^{F}
Kusno Hadi Saputra (INA)	0
Takehiro Kanakubo (JPN)	6^{F}
Payam Boveiri (IRI)	7
Gurpreet Singh (IND)	2

Semifinals
Kim Hyeon-woo (KOR)	8^{C}
Doszhan Kartikov (KAZ)	2
Takehiro Kanakubo (JPN)	1
Payam Boveiri (IRI)	1

Gold medal
Kim Hyeon-woo (KOR)	4
Takehiro Kanakubo (JPN)	0

=== Repechage ===
Repechage
Amanaly Ataýew (TKM)	7
Kusno Hadi Saputra (INA)	1

Bronze medals
Samat Shirdakov (KGZ)	0
Doszhan Kartikov (KAZ)	2
Amanaly Ataýew (TKM)	0
Payam Boveiri (IRI)	9

== Final standing ==
Rank	Athlete
1st place, gold medalist(s)	Kim Hyeon-woo (KOR)
2nd place, silver medalist(s)	Takehiro Kanakubo (JPN)
3rd place, bronze medalist(s)	Doszhan Kartikov (KAZ)
3rd place, bronze medalist(s)	Payam Boveiri (IRI)
5	Samat Shirdakov (KGZ)
5	Amanaly Ataýew (TKM)
7	Kusno Hadi Saputra (INA)
8	Gurpreet Singh (IND)
9	Nurbek Khashimbekov (UZB)
10	Atthaphol Sirithahan (THA)
11	Yang Bin (CHN)
12	Bakhit Sharif Badr (QAT)
