= Wrestling at the 2014 Asian Games – Men's Greco-Roman 66 kg =

Men's Greco-Roman 66 kg at the 2014 Asian Games
- Venue: Dowon Gymnasium
- Date: 1 October 2014
- Competitors: 14 from 14 nations

Medalists
gold medal	Ryu Han-su	South Korea
silver medal	Ryutaro Matsumoto	Japan
bronze medal	Ri Hak-won	North Korea
bronze medal	Afshin Biabangard	Iran

The men's Greco-Roman 66 kilograms wrestling competition at the 2014 Asian Games in Incheon was held on 1 October 2014 at the Dowon Gymnasium.

== Schedule ==
All times are Korea Standard Time (UTC+09:00)

Date	Time	Event
Wednesday, 1 October 2014	13:00	1/8 finals
Wednesday, 1 October 2014	13:00	Quarterfinals
Wednesday, 1 October 2014	13:00	Semifinals
Wednesday, 1 October 2014	13:00	Repechages
Wednesday, 1 October 2014	19:00	Finals

== Results ==
Legend

- C — Won by 3 cautions given to the opponent

=== Main bracket ===
1/8 finals
Tun Aung (MYA)	0
Ryutaro Matsumoto (JPN)	10
Sandeep Tulsi Yadav (IND)	0
Khusrav Obloberdiev (TJK)	10
Elmurat Tasmuradov (UZB)	11
Esmail Ali Saleh (YEM)	0
Arslan Oraşew (TKM)	0
Askhat Zhanbirov (KAZ)	9
Ryu Han-su (KOR)	4^{C}
Zheng Pan (CHN)	0
Afshin Biabangard (IRI)	8
Ruslan Tsarev (KGZ)	0

Quarterfinals
Ahmed Juma (IRQ)	0
Ri Hak-won (PRK)	6
Ryutaro Matsumoto (JPN)	5
Khusrav Obloberdiev (TJK)	2
Elmurat Tasmuradov (UZB)	3
Askhat Zhanbirov (KAZ)	0
Ryu Han-su (KOR)	3
Afshin Biabangard (IRI)	0

Semifinals
Ri Hak-won (PRK)	1
Ryutaro Matsumoto (JPN)	4
Elmurat Tasmuradov (UZB)	6
Ryu Han-su (KOR)	6

Gold medal
Ryutaro Matsumoto (JPN)	0
Ryu Han-su (KOR)	2

=== Repechage ===
Repechage
Tun Aung (MYA)	0
Khusrav Obloberdiev (TJK)	8
Zheng Pan (CHN)	3
Afshin Biabangard (IRI)	5

Bronze medals
Khusrav Obloberdiev (TJK)	0
Ri Hak-won (PRK)	4
Afshin Biabangard (IRI)	7
Elmurat Tasmuradov (UZB)	1

== Final standing ==
Rank	Athlete
1st place, gold medalist(s)	Ryu Han-su (KOR)
2nd place, silver medalist(s)	Ryutaro Matsumoto (JPN)
3rd place, bronze medalist(s)	Ri Hak-won (PRK)
3rd place, bronze medalist(s)	Afshin Biabangard (IRI)
5	Khusrav Obloberdiev (TJK)
5	Elmurat Tasmuradov (UZB)
7	Askhat Zhanbirov (KAZ)
8	Zheng Pan (CHN)
9	Ahmed Juma (IRQ)
10	Ruslan Tsarev (KGZ)
11	Arslan Oraşew (TKM)
12	Sandeep Tulsi Yadav (IND)
13	Esmail Ali Saleh (YEM)
14	Tun Aung (MYA)
