= Wrestling at the 2014 Asian Games – Women's freestyle 63 kg =

Women's freestyle 63 kg at the 2014 Asian Games
- Venue: Dowon Gymnasium
- Date: 27 September 2014
- Competitors: 14 from 14 nations

Medalists
gold medal	Rio Watari	Japan
silver medal	Xiluo Zhuoma	China
bronze medal	Sükheegiin Tserenchimed	Mongolia
bronze medal	Geetika Jakhar	India

The women's freestyle 63 kilograms wrestling competition at the 2014 Asian Games in Incheon was held on 27 September 2014 at the Dowon Gymnasium.

== Schedule ==
All times are Korea Standard Time (UTC+09:00)

Date	Time	Event
Saturday, 27 September 2014	13:00	1/8 finals
Saturday, 27 September 2014	13:00	Quarterfinals
Saturday, 27 September 2014	13:00	Semifinals
Saturday, 27 September 2014	13:00	Repechages
Saturday, 27 September 2014	19:00	Finals

== Results ==
Legend

- F — Won by fall

=== Main bracket ===
1/8 finals
Oday Latxomphou (LAO)	0
Kim Kyeong-eun (KOR)	10
Rio Watari (JPN)	10
Chen Wen-ling (TPE)	0
Xiluo Zhuoma (CHN)	6^{F}
Aziza Sultamuratova (UZB)	0
May Thazin Phue (MYA)	0
Lý Thị Hiền (VIE)	10
Geetika Jakhar (IND)	5
Yekaterina Larionova (KAZ)	4
Jaratrawee Autnun (THA)	10
Wioletta Şumilowa (TKM)	0

Quarterfinals
Sükheegiin Tserenchimed (MGL)	2^{F}
Kim Ran-mi (PRK)	2
Kim Kyeong-eun (KOR)	2
Rio Watari (JPN)	12^{F}
Xiluo Zhuoma (CHN)	4^{F}
Lý Thị Hiền (VIE)	0
Geetika Jakhar (IND)	8^{F}
Jaratrawee Autnun (THA)	0

Semifinals
Sükheegiin Tserenchimed (MGL)	8
Rio Watari (JPN)	11
Xiluo Zhuoma (CHN)	11^{F}
Geetika Jakhar (IND)	2

Gold medal
Rio Watari (JPN)	4
Xiluo Zhuoma (CHN)	4

=== Repechage ===
Repechage
Chen Wen-ling (TPE)	2
Kim Kyeong-eun (KOR)	7
Aziza Sultamuratova (UZB)	0
Lý Thị Hiền (VIE)	8^{F}

Bronze medals
Kim Kyeong-eun (KOR)	0
Sükheegiin Tserenchimed (MGL)	10
Lý Thị Hiền (VIE)	0
Geetika Jakhar (IND)	4^{F}

== Final standing ==
Rank	Athlete
1st place, gold medalist(s)	Rio Watari (JPN)
2nd place, silver medalist(s)	Xiluo Zhuoma (CHN)
3rd place, bronze medalist(s)	Sükheegiin Tserenchimed (MGL)
3rd place, bronze medalist(s)	Geetika Jakhar (IND)
5	Kim Kyeong-eun (KOR)
5	Lý Thị Hiền (VIE)
7	Jaratrawee Autnun (THA)
8	Yekaterina Larionova (KAZ)
9	Chen Wen-ling (TPE)
10	Kim Ran-mi (PRK)
11	Oday Latxomphou (LAO)
11	May Thazin Phue (MYA)
11	Wioletta Şumilowa (TKM)
14	Aziza Sultamuratova (UZB)
