= Boxing at the 2014 Asian Games – Men's 49 kg =

Boxing competitions

Men's 49 kg at the 2014 Asian Games
- Venue: Seonhak Gymnasium
- Date: 25 September – 3 October 2014
- Competitors: 22 from 22 nations

Medalists
gold medal	Shin Jong-hun	South Korea
silver medal	Birzhan Zhakypov	Kazakhstan
bronze medal	Turat Osmonov	Kyrgyzstan
bronze medal	Mark Anthony Barriga	Philippines

The men's light flyweight (49 kilograms) event at the 2014 Asian Games took place from 25 September to 3 October 2014 at Seonhak Gymnasium, Incheon, South Korea

== Schedule ==
All times are Korea Standard Time (UTC+09:00)

Date	Time	Event
Thursday, 25 September 2014	19:00	Preliminaries 1
Sunday, 28 September 2014	19:00	Preliminaries 2
Tuesday, 30 September 2014	19:00	Quarterfinals
Thursday, 2 October 2014	19:00	Semifinals
Friday, 3 October 2014	14:00	Final

== Results ==
Legend

- TKO — Won by technical knockout
- WO — Won by walkover

=== Final ===
Final
Birzhan Zhakypov (KAZ)	0
Shin Jong-hun (KOR)	3

=== Top half ===
Preliminaries 1

Preliminaries 2
Bikram Pariyar (NEP)	0
Mohd Fuad Redzuan (MAS)	3
Abdulhaeem Mohibullah (PAK)	0
Birzhan Zhakypov (KAZ)	3
Turat Osmonov (KGZ)	3
Hasan Ali (IRQ)	0
Gankhuyagiin Gan-Erdene (MGL)	3
Tanes Ongjunta (THA)	0

Quarterfinals
Mohd Fuad Redzuan (MAS)	0
Birzhan Zhakypov (KAZ)	3
Turat Osmonov (KGZ)	3
Gankhuyagiin Gan-Erdene (MGL)	0

Semifinals
Birzhan Zhakypov (KAZ)	3
Turat Osmonov (KGZ)	0

=== Bottom half ===
Preliminaries 1
Devendro Singh (IND)	WO
Fahad Al-Bathali (KUW)
Bounphone Lasavongsy (LAO)	3
Mohammad Omid Rahemi (AFG)	0
Lü Bin (CHN)	0
Hasanboy Dusmatov (UZB)	3
Kornelis Kwangu Langu (INA)	2
Murodjon Rasulov (TJK)	1
Mark Anthony Barriga (PHI)	2
Hussin Al-Masri (SYR)	1
Sanad Al-Miqtafi (KSA)
Tosho Kashiwazaki (JPN)	TKO

Preliminaries 2
Ham Jong-hyok (PRK)	0
Shin Jong-hun (KOR)	3
Devendro Singh (IND)	TKO
Bounphone Lasavongsy (LAO)
Hasanboy Dusmatov (UZB)	3
Kornelis Kwangu Langu (INA)	0
Mark Anthony Barriga (PHI)	3
Tosho Kashiwazaki (JPN)	0

Quarterfinals
Shin Jong-hun (KOR)	3
Devendro Singh (IND)	0
Hasanboy Dusmatov (UZB)	1
Mark Anthony Barriga (PHI)	2

Semifinals
Shin Jong-hun (KOR)	3
Mark Anthony Barriga (PHI)	0
