= Wushu at the 2014 Asian Games – Men's sanda 60 kg =

Men's sanda 60 kg at the 2014 Asian Games
- Venue: Ganghwa Dolmens Gymnasium
- Dates: 20–24 September 2014
- Competitors: 16 from 16 nations

Medalists
gold medal	Kong Hongxing	China
silver medal	Jean Claude Saclag	Philippines
bronze medal	Narender Grewal	India
bronze medal	Kang Yeong-sik	South Korea

The men's sanda 60 kilograms competition at the 2014 Asian Games in Incheon, South Korea was held from 20 September to 24 September at the Ganghwa Dolmens Gymnasium.

Sanda is an unsanctioned fight is a Chinese self-defense system and combat sport. Amateur Sanda allows kicks, punches, knees (not to the head), and throws.

A total of sixteen competitors from sixteen countries competed in this event, limited to fighters whose body weight was less than 60 kilograms.

Kong Hongxing from China won the gold medal after beating Jean Claude Saclag of the Philippines in gold medal bout 2–0, Kong won both periods by the same score of 5–0. The bronze medal was shared by Narender Grewal from India and Kang Yeong-sik of South Korea.

== Schedule ==
All times are Korea Standard Time (UTC+09:00)

Date	Time	Event
Saturday, 20 September 2014	19:00	Round of 16
Sunday, 21 September 2014	19:00	Round of 16
Monday, 22 September 2014	19:00	Quarterfinals
Tuesday, 23 September 2014	19:00	Semifinals
Wednesday, 24 September 2014	15:00	Final

== Results ==
Legend

- TV — Technical victory

Round of 16
Hendrik Tarigan (INA)	2
Helal Al-Hajj (YEM)	0
Kyaw Lin Tun (MYA)	0
Jean Claude Saclag (PHI)	2
Narender Grewal (IND)	2
Mangal Prasad Tharu (NEP)	0
Aday Abuhasoah (JOR)	0
Abdullah (PAK)	2
Hoàng Văn Cao (VIE)	0
Kang Yeong-sik (KOR)	2
Phoxay Aphailath (LAO)	2
Khalid Hotak (AFG)	1
Hussain Al-Khaledi (KUW)
Li Sone Wai (HKG)	TV
Rustam Ibragimov (KGZ)	0
Kong Hongxing (CHN)	2

Quarterfinals
Hendrik Tarigan (INA)	0
Jean Claude Saclag (PHI)	2
Narender Grewal (IND)	2
Abdullah (PAK)	0
Kang Yeong-sik (KOR)	2
Phoxay Aphailath (LAO)	0
Li Sone Wai (HKG)	0
Kong Hongxing (CHN)	2

Semifinals
Jean Claude Saclag (PHI)	2
Narender Grewal (IND)	0
Kang Yeong-sik (KOR)	0
Kong Hongxing (CHN)	2

Final
Jean Claude Saclag (PHI)	0
Kong Hongxing (CHN)	2
