= Wrestling at the 2014 Asian Games – Women's freestyle 55 kg =

Women's freestyle 55 kg at the 2014 Asian Games
- Venue: Dowon Gymnasium
- Date: 28 September 2014
- Competitors: 12 from 12 nations

Medalists
gold medal	Saori Yoshida	Japan
silver medal	Sündeviin Byambatseren	Mongolia
bronze medal	Aisuluu Tynybekova	Kyrgyzstan
bronze medal	Zhong Xuechun	China

The women's freestyle 55 kilograms wrestling competition at the 2014 Asian Games in Incheon was held on 28 September 2014 at the Dowon Gymnasium.

== Schedule ==
All times are Korea Standard Time (UTC+09:00)

Date	Time	Event
Sunday, 28 September 2014	13:00	1/8 finals
Sunday, 28 September 2014	13:00	Quarterfinals
Sunday, 28 September 2014	13:00	Semifinals
Sunday, 28 September 2014	13:00	Repechages
Sunday, 28 September 2014	19:00	Finals

== Results ==
Legend

- F — Won by fall

=== Main bracket ===
1/8 finals
Soumaly Phinith (LAO)	0
Phạm Thị Loan (VIE)	2^{F}
Saori Yoshida (JPN)	12
Zhong Xuechun (CHN)	9
Asem Seydametova (UZB)	0
Aiyim Abdildina (KAZ)	2^{F}
Dorn Srey Mao (CAM)	0
Babita Kumari (IND)	10^{F}

Quarterfinals
Aisuluu Tynybekova (KGZ)	4
Sündeviin Byambatseren (MGL)	4
Um Ji-eun (KOR)	5
Jong In-sun (PRK)	8
Phạm Thị Loan (VIE)	0
Saori Yoshida (JPN)	2^{F}
Aiyim Abdildina (KAZ)	10
Babita Kumari (IND)	13

Semifinals
Sündeviin Byambatseren (MGL)	6^{F}
Jong In-sun (PRK)	0
Saori Yoshida (JPN)	14
Babita Kumari (IND)	4

Gold medal
Sündeviin Byambatseren (MGL)	1
Saori Yoshida (JPN)	12

=== Repechage ===
Repechage
Zhong Xuechun (CHN)	14^{F}
Phạm Thị Loan (VIE)	3

Bronze medals
Aisuluu Tynybekova (KGZ)	5^{F}
Jong In-sun (PRK)	1
Zhong Xuechun (CHN)	10
Babita Kumari (IND)	2

== Final standing ==
Rank	Athlete
1st place, gold medalist(s)	Saori Yoshida (JPN)
2nd place, silver medalist(s)	Sündeviin Byambatseren (MGL)
3rd place, bronze medalist(s)	Aisuluu Tynybekova (KGZ)
3rd place, bronze medalist(s)	Zhong Xuechun (CHN)
5	Jong In-sun (PRK)
5	Babita Kumari (IND)
7	Aiyim Abdildina (KAZ)
8	Phạm Thị Loan (VIE)
9	Um Ji-eun (KOR)
10	Soumaly Phinith (LAO)
10	Asem Seydametova (UZB)
12	Dorn Srey Mao (CAM)
