= Boxing at the 2014 Asian Games – Men's 52 kg =

Boxing competitions

Men's 52 kg at the 2014 Asian Games
- Venue: Seonhak Gymnasium
- Date: 25 September – 3 October 2014
- Competitors: 19 from 19 nations

Medalists
gold medal	Ilyas Suleimenov	Kazakhstan
silver medal	Shakhobidin Zoirov	Uzbekistan
bronze medal	Muhammad Waseem	Pakistan
bronze medal	Shota Hayashida	Japan

The men's flyweight (52 kilograms) event at the 2014 Asian Games took place from 25 September to 3 October 2014 at Seonhak Gymnasium, Incheon, South Korea.

== Schedule ==
All times are Korea Standard Time (UTC+09:00)

Date	Time	Event
Thursday, 25 September 2014	14:00	Preliminaries 1
Saturday, 27 September 2014	19:00	Preliminaries 2
Monday, 29 September 2014	19:00	Quarterfinals
Thursday, 2 October 2014	14:00	Semifinals
Friday, 3 October 2014	14:00	Final

== Results ==
Legend

- TKO — Won by technical knockout
- TKOI — Won by technical knockout injury

=== Final ===
Final
Shakhobidin Zoirov (UZB)	1
Ilyas Suleimenov (KAZ)	2

=== Top half ===
Preliminaries 1

Preliminaries 2
Shakhobidin Zoirov (UZB)	3
Chang Yong (CHN)	0
Prem Chaudhury (NEP)	0
Gaurav Bidhuri (IND)	3
Azat Usenaliev (KGZ)	3
Murtadha Raad (IRQ)	0
Muhammad Waseem (PAK)	2
Ri Chung-il (PRK)	1

Quarterfinals
Shakhobidin Zoirov (UZB)	3
Gaurav Bidhuri (IND)	0
Azat Usenaliev (KGZ)
Muhammad Waseem (PAK)	TKOI

Semifinals
Shakhobidin Zoirov (UZB)	3
Muhammad Waseem (PAK)	0

=== Bottom half ===
Preliminaries 1
Ilyas Suleimenov (KAZ)	3
Chatchai Butdee (THA)	0
Choe Sang-don (KOR)	3
Kinley Gyeltshen (BHU)	0
Abdallah Shamon (JOR)	0
Ian Clark Bautista (PHI)	3

Preliminaries 2
Suresh Pattiarachchi (SRI)	0
Shota Hayashida (JPN)	3
Zarip Jumaýew (TKM)	TKO
Abdullah Al-Otaibi (KUW)
Julio Bria (INA)	0
Ilyas Suleimenov (KAZ)	3
Choe Sang-don (KOR)	3
Ian Clark Bautista (PHI)	0

Quarterfinals
Shota Hayashida (JPN)	2
Zarip Jumaýew (TKM)	0
Ilyas Suleimenov (KAZ)	2
Choe Sang-don (KOR)	1

Semifinals
Shota Hayashida (JPN)	0
Ilyas Suleimenov (KAZ)	3
