= Kong Hongxing =

Chinese Sanshou kickboxer (born 1992)

- Born: February 12, 1992 (age 34); Kaifeng, Henan, China
- Native name: 孔洪星
- Other names: "The Mastermind"
- Nationality: Chinese
- Height: 1.74 m (5 ft 8 1/2 in)
- Weight: 59.5 kg (131 lb; 9.37 st)
- Division: Bantamweight
- Style: Sanda
- Stance: Southpaw
- Fighting out of: Zhengzhou, China
- Team: Tagou Martial Arts School
- Trainer: Xiao Zhimin

Kickboxing record
- Total: 66
- Wins: 54
- By knockout: 18
- Losses: 12
- Draws: 0

Other information
- University: Zhengzhou University

Kong Hongxing
Medal record

Representing China

Wushu Sanda

World Wushu Championships
Gold medal – first place	2015 Jakarta	Sanda −60kg

Asian Games
Gold medal – first place	2014 Incheon	Sanda −60kg

National Wushu Championships
Gold medal – first place	2015 Nationals	Sanda −60kg
Gold medal – first place	2014 Nationals	Sanda −60kg

Kong Hongxing (Chinese: 孔洪星, born February 12, 1992) is a Chinese Sanda kickboxer training out of the Shaolin Tagou Martial Arts School. Aside from being one of China's most decorated Sanda athletes, he is also notable for having an upset victory over the Muay Thai legend Saenchai.

== Background ==
Kong Hongxing was born on May 25, 1992, in Lankao County, Henan, to a rural family of farmers with his father being a martial artist himself. As a child, Kong had a keen interest and passion for martial arts as he would often practice with his father. However, because of his energetic nature, he was noted to have no interest in his school work and would often having trouble staying on task. This eventually led to his father enrolling him into the Tagou Martial Arts school where he would begin to lay the foundations of a successful sanda career.

== Career ==
December 28, 2013, Foshan K-1 World MAX 2013 World Championship, Kong Hongxing fought the Muay Thai Legend Saenchai under K-1 Rules. The fight was declared a draw after three rounds of back and forth action from both fighters causing the judges to declare an extra round to determine a victor. Kong was ultimately declared the winner via split decision after a very close and evenly matched fourth round.

October 14, 2017, Guangzhou Glory 46: China, Kong Hongxing made his GLORY debut in a sanda bout against fellow countryman Yang Sun. Being the far more experienced and decorated competitor, Kong only needed 36 seconds to Knockout his opponent with a devastating head kick in the first round.

== Championships and awards ==
Sanda

- World Sanda Championships
  - 2015 World Sanda Championships (gold) -60 kg
- National Wushu Championships
  - 2015 National Wushu Championships Men's Sanda (gold) -60 kg
  - 2014 National Wushu Championships Men's Sanda (gold) -60 kg
- Asian Games
  - 2014 Asian Games Men's Sanda (gold) −60 kg
- Sanda Premiere League
  - 2018 SPL Tournament Winner −65 kg

== Kickboxing and Sanda record (incomplete) ==
Kickboxing record
54 Wins (18 (T)KO's), 12 Losses, 0 Draws
Date	Result	Opponent	Event	Location	Method	Round	Time
2018-12-30	Win	(China) Chen Hongxing	Sanda Premiere League year-end finals: 65 kg	Shanghai, China	TKO (Throw)	1	2:58
Wins SPL −65.0kg Tournament.
2018-09-22	Win	(Japan) Takaki Hosogoe	Kunlun Fight	Wenzhou City, China	KO (Left Hook)	1	1:42
2018-05-12	Win	(China) Wang Tengteng	Sanda Premiere League	Shanghai, China	Decision (Unanimous)	3	3:00
2017-10-14	Win	(China) Yang Sun	Glory 46: China	Guangzhou, China	KO (Left Head Kick)	1	0:36
2015-11-18	Win	(Russia) Ali Magomedov	2015 Jakarta Men's sanda 60 kg Finals	Jakarta, Indonesia	Decision (2–0)	3	3:00
Wins 2015 Jakarta Men's sanda −60.0kg Gold Medal.
2014-09-24	Win	(Philippines) Jean Claude Saclag	2014 Asian Games Men's sanda 60 kg Finals	Incheon, South Korea	Decision (2–0)	3	3:00
Wins 2014 Asian Games Men's sanda −60.0kg Gold Medal.
2014-09-23	Win	(South Korea) Kang Yeong-sik	2014 Asian Games Men's sanda 60 kg Semi Finals	Incheon, South Korea	Decision (2–0)	3	3:00
2014-09-22	Win	(Hong Kong) Li Sone Wai	2014 Asian Games Men's sanda 60 kg Quarter Finals	Incheon, South Korea	Decision (2–0)	3	3:00
2014-09-21	Win	(Kyrgyzstan) Rustam Ibragimov	2014 Asian Games Men's sanda 60 kg First Round	Incheon, South Korea	Decision (2–0)	3	3:00
2013-12-28	Win	(Thailand) Saenchai	K-1 World MAX World Championship Tournament Quarter-final in Foshan	Foshan, China	Ext. R Decision (Split)	4	3:00
Legend: Win Loss Draw/No contest Notes
