= Payam Boveiri =

Iranian wrestler (born 1994)

Personal information
- Full name: Payam Boveiri Payani
- Nationality: Iran
- Born: January 12, 1994 (age 32) Izeh, Iran

Sport
- Country: Iran
- Sport: Wrestling
Medal record
Representing Iran
Men's Greco-Roman wrestling
Asian Games
Bronze medal – third place	2014 Incheon	75 kg
Asian Championships
Bronze medal – third place	2015 Doha	75 kg
Bronze medal – third place	2016 Bangkok	75 kg
World U23 Championships
Bronze medal – third place	2017 Bydgoszcz	75 kg

Payam Boveiri (Persian: پیام بویری, born January 12, 1994, in Izeh) wrongly known as Payam Bouyeri is an Iranian wrestler. He won a bronze medal at the 2014 Asian Games.
