= Wrestling at the 2018 Asian Games – Men's freestyle 125 kg =

Men's freestyle 125 kg at the 2018 Asian Games
- Venue: Jakarta Convention Center
- Date: 20 August 2018
- Competitors: 13 from 13 nations

Medalists
| gold medal | Parviz Hadi | Iran |
| silver medal | Deng Zhiwei | China |
| bronze medal | Nam Kyung-jin | South Korea |
| bronze medal | Davit Modzmanashvili | Uzbekistan |

The men's freestyle 125 kilograms wrestling competition at the 2018 Asian Games in Jakarta was held on 20 August 2018 at the Jakarta Convention Center Assembly Hall.

== Schedule ==
All times are Western Indonesia Time (UTC+07:00)

| Date | Time | Event |
|---|---|---|
| Monday, 20 August 2018 | 13:00 | 1/8 finals |
| Monday, 20 August 2018 | 13:00 | Quarterfinals |
| Monday, 20 August 2018 | 13:00 | Semifinals |
| Monday, 20 August 2018 | 13:00 | Repechages |
| Monday, 20 August 2018 | 19:00 | Finals |

== Results ==
Legend

- F — Won by fall

=== Main bracket ===
1/8 finals
Sayed Khalid Hashemi (AFG) | 2
Tayab Raza (PAK) | 11^{F}
Natsagsürengiin Zolboo (MGL) | 10
Farkhod Anakulov (TJK) | 0
Davit Modzmanashvili (UZB) | 10
Dimas Septo Anugraha (INA) | 0
Parviz Hadi (IRI) | 10
Sumit Malik (IND) | 0
Nobuyoshi Arakida (JPN) | 0
Oleg Boltin (KAZ) | 1

Quarterfinals
Nam Kyung-jin (KOR) | 12
Söhbet Belliýew (TKM) | 0
Deng Zhiwei (CHN) | 10
Tayab Raza (PAK) | 0
Natsagsürengiin Zolboo (MGL) | 0
Davit Modzmanashvili (UZB) | 3
Parviz Hadi (IRI) | 10
Oleg Boltin (KAZ) | 0

Semifinals
Nam Kyung-jin (KOR) | 0
Deng Zhiwei (CHN) | 6^{F}
Davit Modzmanashvili (UZB) | 8
Parviz Hadi (IRI) | 11

Final
Deng Zhiwei (CHN) | 0
Parviz Hadi (IRI) | 7

=== Repechage ===
Repechage round 1
Sumit Malik (IND) | 7
Oleg Boltin (KAZ) | 0

Bronze medals
Tayab Raza (PAK) | 0
Nam Kyung-jin (KOR) | 9
Sumit Malik (IND) | 0
Davit Modzmanashvili (UZB) | 2

== Final standing ==
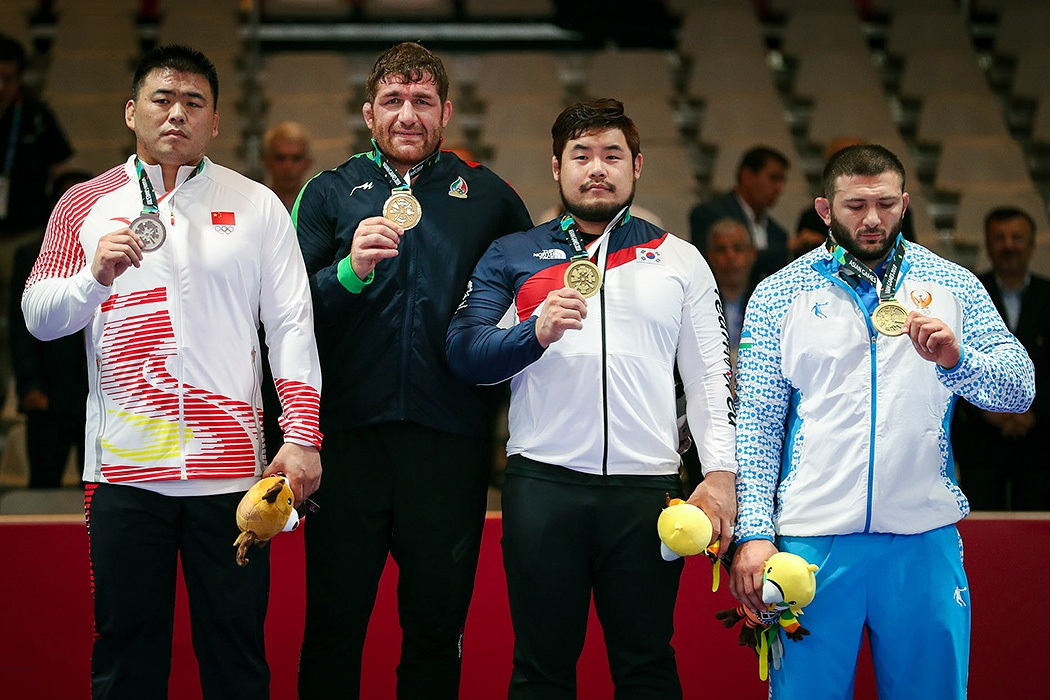
Podium, Left-right: Deng, Hadi, Nam, Modzmanashvili

| Rank | Athlete |
|---|---|
| 1st place, gold medalist(s) | Parviz Hadi (IRI) |
| 2nd place, silver medalist(s) | Deng Zhiwei (CHN) |
| 3rd place, bronze medalist(s) | Nam Kyung-jin (KOR) |
| 3rd place, bronze medalist(s) | Davit Modzmanashvili (UZB) |
| 5 | Tayab Raza (PAK) |
| 5 | Sumit Malik (IND) |
| 7 | Natsagsürengiin Zolboo (MGL) |
| 8 | Oleg Boltin (KAZ) |
| 9 | Sayed Khalid Hashemi (AFG) |
| 10 | Nobuyoshi Arakida (JPN) |
| 11 | Farkhod Anakulov (TJK) |
| 11 | Dimas Septo Anugraha (INA) |
| 13 | Söhbet Belliýew (TKM) |
