= Wrestling at the 2014 Asian Games – Men's freestyle 125 kg =

Men's freestyle 125 kg at the 2014 Asian Games
- Venue: Dowon Gymnasium
- Date: 29 September 2014
- Competitors: 10 from 10 nations

Medalists
gold medal	Parviz Hadi	Iran
silver medal	Daulet Shabanbay	Kazakhstan
bronze medal	Nobuyoshi Arakida	Japan
bronze medal	Nam Kyung-jin	South Korea

The men's freestyle 125 kilograms wrestling competition at the 2014 Asian Games in Incheon was held on 29 September 2014 at the Dowon Gymnasium.

== Schedule ==
All times are Korea Standard Time (UTC+09:00)

Date	Time	Event
Monday, 29 September 2014	13:00	1/8 finals
Monday, 29 September 2014	13:00	Quarterfinals
Monday, 29 September 2014	13:00	Semifinals
Monday, 29 September 2014	13:00	Repechages
Monday, 29 September 2014	19:00	Finals

== Results ==
Legend

- F — Won by fall

=== Main bracket ===
1/8 finals
Jargalsaikhany Chuluunbat (MGL)	4^{F}
Salem Mohammed (KSA)	0
Parviz Hadi (IRI)	11
Deng Zhiwei (CHN)	0

Quarterfinals
Raja Al-Karrad (SYR)	0
Daulet Shabanbay (KAZ)	7
Mohammed Sabah (IRQ)	4
Nobuyoshi Arakida (JPN)	11^{F}
Nam Kyung-jin (KOR)	3
Aiaal Lazarev (KGZ)	0
Jargalsaikhany Chuluunbat (MGL)	0
Parviz Hadi (IRI)	4

Semifinals
Daulet Shabanbay (KAZ)	3
Nobuyoshi Arakida (JPN)	0
Nam Kyung-jin (KOR)	1
Parviz Hadi (IRI)	9

Gold medal
Daulet Shabanbay (KAZ)	1
Parviz Hadi (IRI)	6

=== Repechage ===
Repechage
Deng Zhiwei (CHN)	10
Jargalsaikhany Chuluunbat (MGL)	16

Bronze medals
Raja Al-Karrad (SYR)	2
Nobuyoshi Arakida (JPN)	11
Jargalsaikhany Chuluunbat (MGL)	6
Nam Kyung-jin (KOR)	14

== Final standing ==
Rank	Athlete
1st place, gold medalist(s)	Parviz Hadi (IRI)
2nd place, silver medalist(s)	Daulet Shabanbay (KAZ)
3rd place, bronze medalist(s)	Nobuyoshi Arakida (JPN)
3rd place, bronze medalist(s)	Nam Kyung-jin (KOR)
5	Raja Al-Karrad (SYR)
5	Jargalsaikhany Chuluunbat (MGL)
7	Deng Zhiwei (CHN)
8	Mohammed Sabah (IRQ)
9	Aiaal Lazarev (KGZ)
10	Salem Mohammed (KSA)
