= Karate at the 2014 Asian Games – Men's kumite 84 kg =

Karate competition

Men's kumite 84 kg at the 2014 Asian Games
- Venue: Gyeyang Gymnasium
- Date: 4 October 2014
- Competitors: 13 from 13 nations

Medalists
gold medal	Ryutaro Araga	Japan
silver medal	Hamad Al-Nweam	Kuwait
bronze medal	Jang Min-soo	South Korea
bronze medal	Shakhboz Akhatov	Uzbekistan

The men's kumite 84 kilograms competition at the 2014 Asian Games in Incheon, South Korea was held on 4 October 2014 at the Gyeyang Gymnasium.

== Schedule ==
All times are Korea Standard Time (UTC+09:00)

Date	Time	Event
Saturday, 4 October 2014	09:30	1/8 finals
Saturday, 4 October 2014	09:30	Quarterfinals
Saturday, 4 October 2014	09:30	Semifinals
Saturday, 4 October 2014	09:30	Final of repechage
Saturday, 4 October 2014	09:30	Finals

== Results ==
=== Main bracket ===
1/8 finals
Teerawat Kangtong (THA)	10
Muhammad Ramzan (PAK)	6
Jaber Al-Zaabi (UAE)	1
Nguyễn Minh Phụng (VIE)	4
Ryutaro Araga (JPN)	3
Cui Wenju (CHN)	0
Ashraful Islam (BAN)	3
Hendro Salim (INA)	9
Rafat Al-Sheikh Ali (SYR)	5
Hamad Al-Nweam (KUW)	8

Quarterfinals
Teerawat Kangtong (THA)	3
Nguyễn Minh Phụng (VIE)	6
Ryutaro Araga (JPN)	2
Jang Min-soo (KOR)	0
Hendro Salim (INA)	4
Adilet Shadykanov (KGZ)	3
Hamad Al-Nweam (KUW)	4
Shakhboz Akhatov (UZB)	3

Semifinals
Nguyễn Minh Phụng (VIE)	4
Ryutaro Araga (JPN)	6
Hendro Salim (INA)	1
Hamad Al-Nweam (KUW)	2

Final
Ryutaro Araga (JPN)	7
Hamad Al-Nweam (KUW)	1

=== Repechage ===
Final of repechage
Cui Wenju (CHN)	4
Jang Min-soo (KOR)	4
Rafat Al-Sheikh Ali (SYR)	7
Shakhboz Akhatov (UZB)	7

Bronze medal contest
Jang Min-soo (KOR)	5
Nguyễn Minh Phụng (VIE)	2
Shakhboz Akhatov (UZB)	10
Hendro Salim (INA)	3
