= Wrestling at the 2014 Asian Games – Men's Greco-Roman 85 kg =

South Korean wrestling competition in 2014

Men's Greco-Roman 85 kg at the 2014 Asian Games
- Venue: Dowon Gymnasium
- Date: 1 October 2014
- Competitors: 14 from 14 nations

Medalists
gold medal	Rustam Assakalov	Uzbekistan
silver medal	Lee Se-yeol	South Korea
bronze medal	Peng Fei	China
bronze medal	Mojtaba Karimfar	Iran

The men's Greco-Roman 85 kilograms wrestling competition at the 2014 Asian Games in Incheon was held on 1 October 2014 at the Dowon Gymnasium.

== Schedule ==
All times are Korea Standard Time (UTC+09:00)

Date	Time	Event
Wednesday, 1 October 2014	13:00	1/8 finals
Wednesday, 1 October 2014	13:00	Quarterfinals
Wednesday, 1 October 2014	13:00	Semifinals
Wednesday, 1 October 2014	13:00	Repechages
Wednesday, 1 October 2014	19:00	Finals

== Results ==
Legend

- C — Won by 3 cautions given to the opponent
- F — Won by fall

=== Main bracket ===
1/8 finals
Rustam Assakalov (UZB)	4^{F}
Khonekeo Thatthavong (LAO)	0
Nursultan Tursynov (KAZ)	10
Chinnawet Kanchalee (THA)	0
Mojtaba Karimfar (IRI)	8
Abdallah Shahin (JOR)	0
Taichi Oka (JPN)	0
Lee Se-yeol (KOR)	5
Azat Beishebekov (KGZ)	4
Kyýas Esenow (TKM)	0
Ibrahim Hanini (PLE)	0
Jason Balabal (PHI)	10

Quarterfinals
Manoj Kumar (IND)	0
Peng Fei (CHN)	4
Rustam Assakalov (UZB)	6^{C}
Nursultan Tursynov (KAZ)	0
Mojtaba Karimfar (IRI)	5
Lee Se-yeol (KOR)	3^{C}
Azat Beishebekov (KGZ)	11
Jason Balabal (PHI)	2

Semifinals
Peng Fei (CHN)	5
Rustam Assakalov (UZB)	9
Lee Se-yeol (KOR)	3
Azat Beishebekov (KGZ)	0

Gold medal
Rustam Assakalov (UZB)	8
Lee Se-yeol (KOR)	0

=== Repechage ===
Repechage
Khonekeo Thatthavong (LAO)	0
Nursultan Tursynov (KAZ)	10
Taichi Oka (JPN)	0
Mojtaba Karimfar (IRI)	2

Bronze medals
Nursultan Tursynov (KAZ)	2
Peng Fei (CHN)	3
Mojtaba Karimfar (IRI)	3
Azat Beishebekov (KGZ)	0

== Final standing ==
Rank	Athlete
1st place, gold medalist(s)	Rustam Assakalov (UZB)
2nd place, silver medalist(s)	Lee Se-yeol (KOR)
3rd place, bronze medalist(s)	Peng Fei (CHN)
3rd place, bronze medalist(s)	Mojtaba Karimfar (IRI)
5	Nursultan Tursynov (KAZ)
5	Azat Beishebekov (KGZ)
7	Jason Balabal (PHI)
8	Kyýas Esenow (TKM)
8	Manoj Kumar (IND)
10	Taichi Oka (JPN)
11	Abdallah Shahin (JOR)
12	Ibrahim Hanini (PLE)
12	Chinnawet Kanchalee (THA)
14	Khonekeo Thatthavong (LAO)
