= Abdulla Azimov =

Uzbekistani artistic gymnast

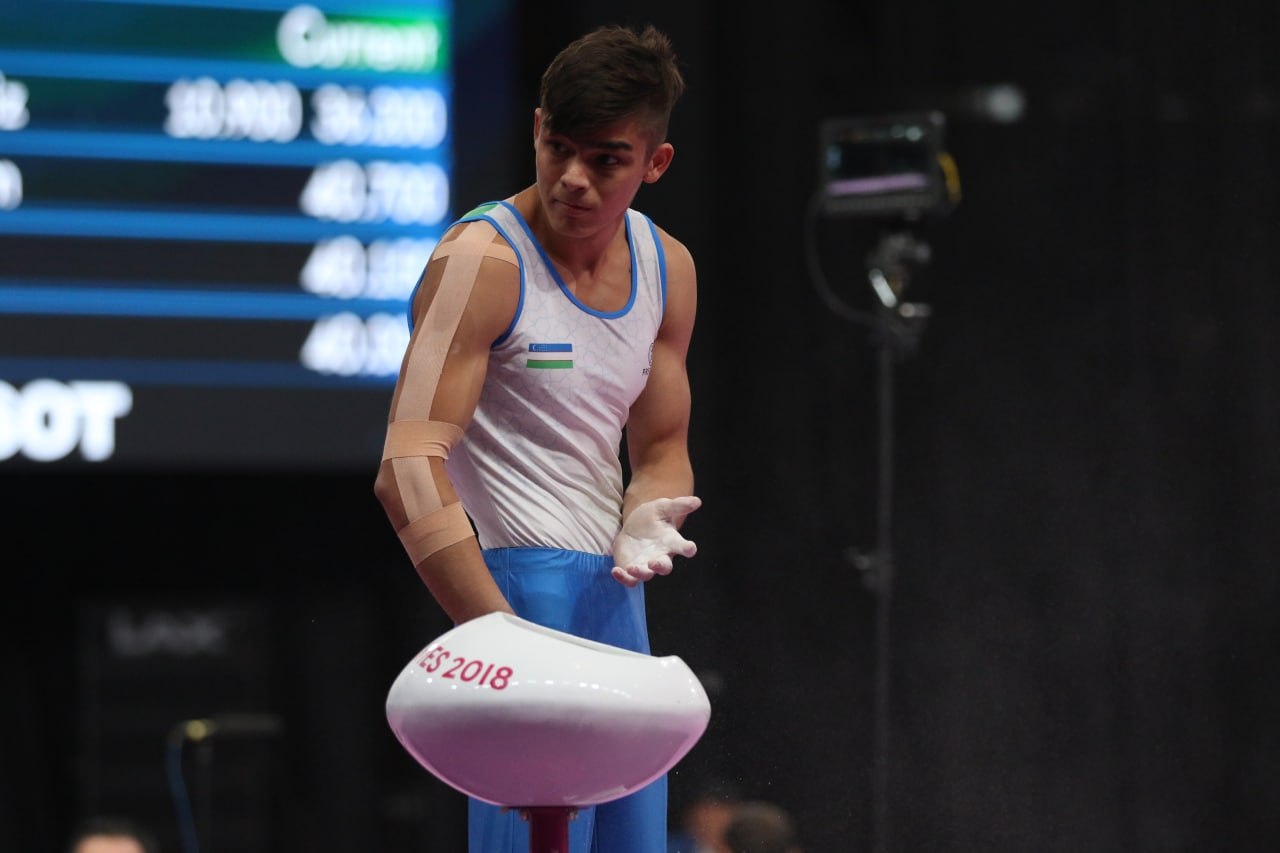
- Azimov in 2022

Personal information
- Born: 20 March 1996 (age 30) Tashkent, Uzbekistan

Gymnastics career
- Discipline: Men's artistic gymnastics
- Country represented: Uzbekistan; (2012–present)
- Head coach: Evgeny Galkin
Medal record
Men's gymnastics
Representing Uzbekistan
Asian Games
Silver medal – second place	2014 Incheon	Pommel horse
Asian Championships
Silver medal – second place	2024 Tashkent	Team
Silver medal – second place	2024 Tashkent	Pommel horse
Bronze medal – third place	2024 Tashkent	All-around
Islamic Solidarity Games
Silver medal – second place	2021 Konya	Team
FIG World Cup
Event	1st	2nd	3rd
Apparatus World Cup	1	0	0
World Challenge Cup	0	1	2
Total	1	1	2

Abdulla Azimov (born 20 March 1996) is an Uzbekistani artistic gymnast. He represented Uzbekistan at the 2024 Summer Olympics. He is the 2024 Asian Championships all-around bronze medalist, the 2024 Asian Championships and 2014 Asian Games silver medalist on the pommel horse. He was part of the teams who won silver at the 2024 Asian Championships and 2021 Islamic Solidarity Games.

== Gymnastics career ==
=== 2014 ===
Azimov began competing in senior international competitions in 2014. At the 2014 Cottbus World Cup, he finished eighth in the pommel horse final. He then finished fifth on the pommel horse at the Anadia World Challenge Cup. He represented Uzbekistan at the 2014 Asian Games where the team finished seventh. Individually, Azimov won the silver medal on the pommel horse behind Japan's Masayoshi Yamamoto. Then at the 2014 World Championships, the Uzbekistan team finished 32nd, and Azimov finished 20th on the pommel horse.

=== 2018–19 ===
Azimov finished fifth in the pommel horse final at the 2018 Mersin World Challenge Cup. He then represented Uzbekistan at the 2018 Asian Games and helped the team finish seventh. Individually, Azimov finished 15th in the all-around. Then at the 2018 World Championships, the Uzbekistan team finished 38th, and Azimov finished 89th in the all-around.

Azimov competed at the 2019 Summer Universiade and qualified for the pommel horse final where he finished fourth. He then competed at the 2019 World Championships, finishing 72nd in the all-around.

=== 2021–22 ===
Azimov won a bronze medal on the pommel horse at the 2021 Varna World Challenge Cup.

Azimov began the 2022 season with a seventh-place finish on the pommel horse at the 2022 Cairo World Cup. He then finished eighth on the pommel horse at the Baku World Cup. He competed at the 2021 Islamic Solidarity Games, held in 2022 due to the COVID-19 pandemic, and won a silver medal with teammates Rasuljon Abdurakhimov and Khabibullo Ergashev. Individually, he finished sixth in the all-around, fifth on the floor exercise, and fourth on the pommel horse. At the 2022 World Championships, he finished ninth on the pommel horse during the qualification round, making her the first reserve for the final.

=== 2023 ===
At the 2023 Cottbus World Cup, Azimov won the gold medal on the pommel horse in an upset victory over World champions and Olympic medalists. Then at the Varna World Challenge Cup, he won the pommel horse silver medal behind Matvei Petrov. He competed at the 2023 Asian Championships and finished eighth in the pommel horse final. Then at the 2023 World Championships, he finished 36th in the all-around during the qualification round.

=== 2024 ===
Azimov won the all-around bronze medal at the 2024 Asian Championships behind Carlos Yulo and Milad Karimi. Because Yulo and Karimi had already qualified for the 2024 Summer Olympics, Azimov received the continental championships berth. Additionally, he won a silver medal with the Uzbekistan team and a silver medal on the pommel horse behind Nariman Kurbanov. At the Olympic Games, he finished 28th in the all-around during the qualification round, making him the second reserve for the final.
