= Rio Watari =

Japanese freestyle wrestler

Personal information
- Born: September 19, 1991 (age 34) Matsue, Japan
- Height: 1.63 m (5 ft 4 in)
- Weight: 63 kg (139 lb)

Sport
- Sport: Freestyle wrestling
Medal record
Representing Japan
Asian Games
Gold medal – first place	2014 Incheon	63 kg
Asian Wrestling Championships
Bronze medal – third place	2012 Gumi	63 kg

Rio Watari (渡利璃穏, Watari Rio; born September 19, 1991) is a Japanese wrestler. She won a gold medal at the 2014 Asian Games in the 63 kg category.
