= Wrestling at the 2014 Asian Games – Men's freestyle 70 kg =

Men's freestyle 70 kg at the 2014 Asian Games
- Venue: Dowon Gymnasium
- Date: 27 September 2014
- Competitors: 12 from 12 nations

Medalists
gold medal	Bekzod Abdurakhmonov	Uzbekistan
silver medal	Oh Man-ho	South Korea
bronze medal	Elaman Dogdurbek Uulu	Kyrgyzstan
bronze medal	Takafumi Kojima	Japan

The men's freestyle 70 kilograms wrestling competition at the 2014 Asian Games in Incheon was held on 27 September 2014 at the Dowon Gymnasium.

== Schedule ==
All times are Korea Standard Time (UTC+09:00)

Date	Time	Event
Saturday, 27 September 2014	13:00	1/8 finals
Saturday, 27 September 2014	13:00	Quarterfinals
Saturday, 27 September 2014	13:00	Semifinals
Saturday, 27 September 2014	13:00	Repechages
Saturday, 27 September 2014	19:00	Finals

== Results ==
Legend

- F — Won by fall

=== Main bracket ===
1/8 finals
Ling Haiwei (CHN)	6^{F}
Win Hlaing Htwe (MYA)	0
Bekzod Abdurakhmonov (UZB)	10
Somirsho Vokhidov (TJK)	0
Azamat Omurzhanov (KAZ)	1
Mostafa Hosseinkhani (IRI)	5
Parveen Rana (IND)	2
Takafumi Kojima (JPN)	3

Quarterfinals
Elaman Dogdurbek Uulu (KGZ)	2
Oh Man-ho (KOR)	7
Jang Myong-song (PRK)	12
Mohammad Shaikhouni (SYR)	4
Ling Haiwei (CHN)	0
Bekzod Abdurakhmonov (UZB)	10^{F}
Mostafa Hosseinkhani (IRI)	3
Takafumi Kojima (JPN)	3

Semifinals
Oh Man-ho (KOR)	1
Jang Myong-song (PRK)	1
Bekzod Abdurakhmonov (UZB)	6
Takafumi Kojima (JPN)	0

Gold medal
Oh Man-ho (KOR)	2
Bekzod Abdurakhmonov (UZB)	7

=== Repechage ===
Repechage
Somirsho Vokhidov (TJK)	7
Ling Haiwei (CHN)	8

Bronze medals
Elaman Dogdurbek Uulu (KGZ)	6
Jang Myong-song (PRK)	0
Ling Haiwei (CHN)	0
Takafumi Kojima (JPN)	8

== Final standing ==
Rank	Athlete
1st place, gold medalist(s)	Bekzod Abdurakhmonov (UZB)
2nd place, silver medalist(s)	Oh Man-ho (KOR)
3rd place, bronze medalist(s)	Elaman Dogdurbek Uulu (KGZ)
3rd place, bronze medalist(s)	Takafumi Kojima (JPN)
5	Jang Myong-song (PRK)
5	Ling Haiwei (CHN)
7	Mostafa Hosseinkhani (IRI)
8	Somirsho Vokhidov (TJK)
9	Mohammad Shaikhouni (SYR)
10	Parveen Rana (IND)
11	Azamat Omurzhanov (KAZ)
12	Win Hlaing Htwe (MYA)
