= Wrestling at the 2014 Asian Games – Men's Greco-Roman 80 kg =

Men's Greco-Roman 80 kg at the 2014 Asian Games
- Venue: Dowon Gymnasium
- Date: 30 September 2014
- Competitors: 8 from 8 nations

Medalists
gold medal	Habibollah Akhlaghi	Iran
silver medal	Tsukasa Tsurumaki	Japan
bronze medal	Besiki Saldadze	Uzbekistan
bronze medal	Janarbek Kenjeev	Kyrgyzstan

The men's Greco-Roman 80 kilograms wrestling competition at the 2014 Asian Games in Incheon was held on 30 September 2014 at the Dowon Gymnasium.

== Schedule ==
All times are Korea Standard Time (UTC+09:00)

Date	Time	Event
Tuesday, 30 September 2014	13:00	Quarterfinals
Tuesday, 30 September 2014	13:00	Semifinals
Tuesday, 30 September 2014	19:00	Finals

== Results ==
Legend

- F — Won by fall
- R — Retired

=== Main bracket ===
Quarterfinals		Semifinals		Gold medal
Harpreet Singh Sandhu (IND)	2
Besiki Saldadze (UZB)	4	Besiki Saldadze (UZB)	0
Jafar Khan (QAT)	1	Habibollah Akhlaghi (IRI)	9
Habibollah Akhlaghi (IRI)	9			Habibollah Akhlaghi (IRI)	5
Mohammed Al-Quhali (YEM)	0			Tsukasa Tsurumaki (JPN)	1
Tsukasa Tsurumaki (JPN)	5^{F}	Tsukasa Tsurumaki (JPN)	4
Janarbek Kenjeev (KGZ)	4^{F}	Janarbek Kenjeev (KGZ)	2
Chen Weiwei (CHN)	0

=== Repechage ===
Bronze medals
Jafar Khan (QAT)	0
Besiki Saldadze (UZB)	8
Mohammed Al-Quhali (YEM)	0^{R}
Janarbek Kenjeev (KGZ)	4

== Final standing ==
Rank	Athlete
1st place, gold medalist(s)	Habibollah Akhlaghi (IRI)
2nd place, silver medalist(s)	Tsukasa Tsurumaki (JPN)
3rd place, bronze medalist(s)	Besiki Saldadze (UZB)
3rd place, bronze medalist(s)	Janarbek Kenjeev (KGZ)
5	Jafar Khan (QAT)
5	Mohammed Al-Quhali (YEM)
7	Harpreet Singh Sandhu (IND)
8	Chen Weiwei (CHN)
