= Gymnastics at the 2014 Asian Games – Men's pommel horse =

Men's pommel horse at the 2014 Asian Games
- Venue: Namdong Gymnasium
- Date: 21–24 September 2014
- Competitors: 60 from 16 nations

Medalists
gold medal	Masayoshi Yamamoto	Japan
silver medal	Abdulla Azimov	Uzbekistan
bronze medal	Park Min-soo	South Korea

The men's pommel horse competition at the 2014 Asian Games in Incheon, South Korea was held on 21 and 24 September 2014 at the Namdong Gymnasium.

== Schedule ==
All times are Korea Standard Time (UTC+09:00)

Date	Time	Event
Sunday, 21 September 2014	10:00	Qualification
Wednesday, 24 September 2014	20:30	Final

== Results ==
=== Qualification ===
Rank	Athlete	Score
1	Tomomasa Hasegawa (JPN)	15.500
2	Shin Dong-hyen (KOR)	15.200
3	Huang Yuguo (CHN)	15.000
4	Abdulla Azimov (UZB)	14.825
5	Masayoshi Yamamoto (JPN)	14.800
6	Saeid Reza Keikha (IRI)	14.800
7	Rartchawat Kaewpanya (THA)	14.750
8	Park Min-soo (KOR)	14.650
9	Lee Chih-kai (TPE)	14.550
10	Kim Hee-hoon (KOR)	14.550
11	Shotaro Shirai (JPN)	14.500
12	Yusuke Saito (JPN)	14.450
13	Hsu Ping-chien (TPE)	14.300
14	Huang Ta-yu (TPE)	14.100
15	Dhan Bahadur (IND)	14.025
16	Đinh Phương Thành (VIE)	14.000
17	Yang Shengchao (CHN)	13.950
18	Lee Sang-wook (KOR)	13.925
19	Yuya Kamoto (JPN)	13.900
20	Kim Jin-hyok (PRK)	13.875
21	Stepan Gorbachev (KAZ)	13.750
22	Huang Xi (CHN)	13.700
23	Lee Hyeok-jung (KOR)	13.650
24	Mohammad Ramezanpour (IRI)	13.600
25	Otabek Masharipov (UZB)	13.550
26	Liao Junlin (CHN)	13.500
27	Mohammad Reza Hamidi (IRI)	13.350
28	Ri Se-gwang (PRK)	13.350
29	Gabriel Gan (SIN)	13.300
30	Đặng Nam (VIE)	13.275
31	Eduard Shaulov (UZB)	13.200
32	Kim Kwang-chun (PRK)	13.150
33	Lê Thanh Tùng (VIE)	13.100
34	Maxim Petrishko (KAZ)	13.100
35	Ahmed Al-Dyani (QAT)	13.100
36	Ra Won-chol (PRK)	12.950
37	Wang Peng (CHN)	12.900
38	Lin Yi-chieh (TPE)	12.850
39	Ahmad Al-Qattan (KUW)	12.825
40	Đỗ Vũ Hưng (VIE)	12.800
41	Iman Khamoushi (IRI)	12.650
42	Han Jong-hyok (PRK)	12.550
43	Ganbatyn Erdenebold (MGL)	12.350
44	Ashish Kumar (IND)	12.300
45	Anton Fokin (UZB)	12.250
45	Phạm Phước Hưng (VIE)	12.250
47	Aditya Singh Rana (IND)	12.150
48	Chandan Pathak (IND)	11.950
49	Rakesh Kumar Patra (IND)	11.500
50	Ilya Kornev (KAZ)	11.250
51	Chen Chih-yu (TPE)	11.150
52	Abdullah Al-Boussi (KSA)	11.050
53	Salokhiddin Mirzaev (UZB)	10.925
54	Malek Al-Yahri (QAT)	10.900
55	Bobby Kriangkum (THA)	10.750
56	Nurbol Babylov (KAZ)	10.550
57	Yousef Al-Sahhaf (KUW)	10.550
58	Pürevdorjiin Otgonbat (MGL)	10.250
59	Aizat Jufrie (SIN)	10.200
60	Mönkhtsogiin Ariunbulag (MGL)	9.550

=== Final ===
Rank	Athlete	Score
1st place, gold medalist(s)	Masayoshi Yamamoto (JPN)	15.033
2nd place, silver medalist(s)	Abdulla Azimov (UZB)	14.866
3rd place, bronze medalist(s)	Park Min-soo (KOR)	14.700
4	Shin Dong-hyen (KOR)	14.666
5	Tomomasa Hasegawa (JPN)	14.233
6	Rartchawat Kaewpanya (THA)	14.200
7	Huang Yuguo (CHN)	14.033
8	Saeid Reza Keikha (IRI)	13.566
