= Narender Grewal =

Indian wushu practitioner

Personal information
- Nationality: Indian
- Born: July 11, 1994 (age 31) Satrod Khas, Hisar, Haryana, India

Sport
- Sport: Wushu
- Event(s): Men's sanda (60 kg, 65 kg)
Medal record
Asian Games
| Bronze medal – third place | 2014 Asian Games | Men's sanda 60 kg |
| Bronze medal – third place | 2018 Asian Games | Men's sanda 65 kg |
World Wushu Championships
| Bronze medal – third place | 2012 | Men's sanda |

Narender Grewal (born 11 July 1994) is an Indian wushu competitor. He was born in Satrod Khas, Hisar, Haryana, India. He won a bronze medal in the men's 60-kg sanda at the 2014 Asian Games. He also won a bronze medal in the men's 65-kg sanda at the 2018 Asian Games. He has won bronze medal in world championship 2012. He is one of the best mixed martial arts athletes in India, with a record of seven wins and one loss.
