= Nam Kyung-jin =

South Korean and Kyrgyz freestyle wrestler

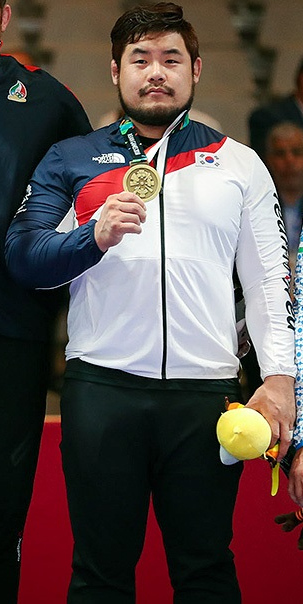
- Nam Kyung-jin in 2018

Personal information
- Born: 25 August 1988 (age 37)

Sport
- Country: South Korea
- Sport: Amateur wrestling
- Weight class: 125 kg
- Event: Freestyle
Medal record
Men's freestyle wrestling
Representing South Korea
Asian Games
Bronze medal – third place	2014 Incheon	125 kg
Bronze medal – third place	2018 Jakarta	125 kg
Asian Championships
Bronze medal – third place	2020 New Delhi	125 kg

Nam Kyung-jin (Korean: 남경진, born 25 August 1988) is a South Korean freestyle wrestler. He won one of the bronze medals at the Asian Games both in 2014 and in 2018 in the men's 125 kg event.

In 2020, he won one of the bronze medals in the 125 kg event at the Asian Wrestling Championships held in New Delhi, India.

In 2023, Nam appeared as a contestant in Netflix's reality Show, Physical: 100.

== Filmography ==
=== Television show ===
Year	Title	Role	Notes	Ref.
2023	World's First Merchant	Contestant	Season 2	

=== Web shows ===
Year	Title	Role	Ref.
2023	Physical: 100	Contestant	

== Achievements ==
Year	Tournament	Location	Result	Event
2014	Asian Games	Incheon, South Korea	3rd	Freestyle 125 kg
2018	Asian Games	Jakarta, Indonesia	3rd	Freestyle 125 kg
2020	Asian Championships	New Delhi, India	3rd	Freestyle 125 kg
