= Gaurav Bidhuri =

Indian boxer (born 1993)

Personal information
- Nationality: Indian
- Born: 16 May 1993 (age 33) India
- Height: 170 cm (5 ft 7 in)
- Weight: Bantamweight (56 kg)

Boxing career
Medal record
World Championships
| Bronze medal – third place | 2017 Hamburg | Bantamweight |

Gaurav Bidhuri (born 16 May 1993) is an Indian boxer from Mandanpur Khadar village, New Delhi who competes in the 56 kg bantamweight division. He is ranked 11th in the World by AIBA in the year 2018. He won a bronze medal at the 2017 World Boxing Championships held at Hamburg, Germany. He is the only 4th Indian boxer who got a medal at World Boxing Championship. He is currently employed with Indian Railways.

== World Championship 2017 ==
Gaurav Bidhuri got a wild-card entry for his debut 2017 World Championship under the Bantamweight category. After winning the quarterfinal bout against Tunisian boxer Bilel Mhamdi, he was guaranteed a medal at the competition.

== Early life ==
Gaurav started his boxing career when he was 11 years old at his father's Boxing club. His father, Dharmender Bidhuri is his first coach who himself is a National Level Boxer. It was his father's dream to represent the country in Olympics and win a medal, but due to family issues, he could not continue his boxing career. His love of boxing could not keep him away from the sport, so he started his own boxing club, where he trains the locals free of cost. Gaurav aims to complete his father's dream to represent the country in Olympics and get a medal for the nation. Gaurav completed his schooling from The Frank Anthony Public School and completed his graduation from Kirori Mal College, Delhi University.

== Boxing career ==
=== 2004-2010 ===
Gaurav won the gold medal in the Delhi State Sub Junior Boxing Championship for 5 consecutive years since 2004. In the year 2005, he was also awarded the Best Boxer in the championship. In 2005, he won a gold medal at the 21st Sub Junior National Boxing Championship held in Noida. In the following year, he won a silver medal at the 22nd Sub Junior Boxing Championship in Jamshedpur. He won a gold medal in the 2007 School National Championship in Punjab along with the title of Best Boxer.

In 2008 he again won two gold medals. One at the 23rd Sub Junior National Boxing Championship held in Galanhad, Assam, and the other in School National Games held in Shimla. He also participated in the Children of Asia Games in Russia. In the 2009 School National championship, he won a silver medal. He was a quarter-finalist in the 2009 AIBA World Junior Boxing Championship held in Yerevan, Armenia. He won a bronze medal in the 2010 Youth School National Championship.

=== 2011-2015 ===
In 2011, Gaurav won a bronze medal at the 21st Presidents Cup held in Jakarta. He bagged a gold medal besides the title of Best Boxer at the 2011 All-India University Boxing Championship taken place in Udaipur. In the same year, he was part of the Mumbai Fighters in the World Series of Boxing and won the match against the Dynamo Moscow. He won a silver medal in the 2012 59th Senior Men's National Boxing Championship in Hyderabad. The boxer was selected for training cum World Boxing Championship in Kazakhstan. He came in at the second position for the World Championship selection trials. He attended the national camp in the month of May. Gaurav was a quarter-finalist in the 17th Asian Games held in Incheon, South Korea. Gaurav captured the silver medal in the Qatar International Boxing Championship. He was part of a training cum competition in China where he defeated the World Number 3 boxer of the year. He was selected by the Italia Thunder for the World Series of Boxing for the session 2014-2015 and 2015–2016. He won three consecutive matches for his team in the tournament. He had a clear victory against Caciques Venezuela's Orlando David Pinosilva

In the two matches held in April, he crushed his opponents Zhakupov Kiras of Astana Arians Kazakhstan and Kozlowski Grzegorz of Rafako Hussars Polland. Earlier in the match held in the month of March, he had lost the match against Azerbaijan Baku Fires' Murad Rabadanov. He also lost the match against USA Knockouts’ Venegas Brent Richard held in June.

=== 2016-2019 ===
Gaurav participated in the World Olympic qualifier held in Azerbaijan. In July, Gaurav reached the quarter-finals of the WSB/APB qualifier at Vargas, Venezuela. He was selected for the World Series of Boxing by USA Knockout for the season 2016 to 2017 but he lost the WSB fight against the British Lionhearts. Gaurav Bidhuri claimed the bronze medal at the AIBA World Boxing Championship held in Hamburg, Germany. He won a gold medal in the 44th Grand Prix held in the month of July in Prague, Czech Republic. He reached the quarter-finals of the Asian Boxing Championship in Tashkent, Uzbekistan.

At the Umakhanov Memorial Tournament in Kapiysk, Russia, he won a bronze medal. He also won a silver medal at the National Boxing Championship held in Pune. Gaurav played for the Bengaluru Brawler in the Big Bout League. He won a silver medal at the Indian Railway Championship held in the month of September. The boxer also won a silver medal at the Presidents Cup in Indonesia. He participated in the Round Robin Cup which took place in Germany. He was also a participant in the Strandhza Cup held in Bulgaria.

== Awards and achievements ==
Gaurav Bidhuri is the 4th Indian Boxer in the history of boxing who has won a medal at the World Boxing Championship. He is the 2nd Indian ever to grab a medal at the debut match of World Boxing Championship. Gaurav is the 1st Indian boxer till now who has signed two successive contracts in the World Series Boxing (for the Italian team in 2015 and the USA team in 2016). He is the first and only wild card player to get a medal at the World Boxing Championship.

Gaurav was nominated for the Arjuna Award, one of the highest-ranked sports, for three consecutive years, 2018, 2019, and 2020.

The Times of India awarded him with The Best Boxer Award in the year 2017.

== Sources ==
- Agnihotri, Shweta (15 November 2019). "Boxing promotor IOS Sports signs 5 World Championship medallist". InsideSport.co. Archived from the original on 5 June 2021.
- बीएफआई ने अमित पंघाल और गौरव बिधूड़ी को अर्जुन पुरस्कार के लिए नामित किया. Amar Ujala. 30 April 2019. Archived from the original on 30 April 2019.
- Banerjee, Ankit (15 July 2020). "INTERVIEW | Delhi Sportsmen Aren't Getting What They Deserve from Government Unlike Other States: Boxer Gaurav Bidhuri". Archived from the original on 12 August 2020.
- Chauhan, Naveen (29 August 2017). मुक्केबाजी: गौरव बिधूड़ी ने विश्व चैंपियनशिप में किया पदक पक्का. Amar Ujala (in Hindi). Archived from the original on 29 August 2017.
- Das, Devadyuti (29 August 2017). "World Boxing Championship: Gaurav Bidhuri assures India a medal". The Times of India. Archived from the original on 29 August 2017.
- Das, Devadyuti (31 August 2017). "Gaurav bidhuri: World Boxing Championship: Gaurav Bidhuri settles for bronze". Sports: Boxing. The Times of India. Archived from the original on 1 September 2017.
- "Mary Kom, Gaurav Bidhuri reach Indonesia President's Cup final". The Statesman. IANS. 28 July 2019. Archived from the original on 5 June 2021.
- "Wish IPL 13 to succeed, it can encourage other sports too: Boxer Gaurav Bidhuri". IANS. 20 August 2020. Archived from the original on 16 January 2021.
- "Exclusive: Gaurav Bidhuri on Tokyo Olympics, Future Plans and Much More". India.com. 28 May 2021. Archived from the original on 28 May 2021.
- Kahekashan (3 November 2018). "National Boxing Championships: Manish Kaushik wins second consecutive gold, Gaurav Bidhuri settles for Silver". Hans India.
- Kumar, Amit (4 September 2017). "Boxer Gaurav Bidhuri Happy To Live Father's Dream Of World Championships". NDTV.
- "President's Cup Boxing: India's Gaurav Bidhuri Enters Semis". Outlook. 25 July 2019. Archived from the original on 26 July 2019.
- Pramod, Ankit (21 August 2020). भारतीय मुक्केबाज ने IPL-13 के सफल होने की कामना की. News Nation (in Hindi).
- "World Boxing Championships: Gaurav Bidhuri 8th Indian boxer to qualify for World Championships". Sports: Boxing. The Times of India. Press Trust of India. 17 July 2017. Archived from the original on 17 July 2017.
- "National Boxing Championships: Gaurav Bidhuri, Manish Kaushik storm into finals". Sports: Boxing. The Times of India. Press Trust of India. 1 November 2018. Archived from the original on 3 November 2018.
- "BFI nominates Amit Panghal, Gaurav Bidhuri for Arjuna award again". India Today. Press Trust of India. 30 April 2019.
- "Had enough of this unfair system: Gaurav Bidhuri after exclusion from Olympic qualifiers' trial". India Today. Press Trust of India. 26 December 2019. Archived from the original on 27 December 2019.
- Sharma, Nitin (30 August 2017). "Boxing World Championships: Gaurav Bidhuri secures medal, makes father's dream come true". Indian Express.
- Sharma, Nitin (17 February 2021). "Punch in the gut: India's boxing contingent for Tokyo affected as qualifiers cancelled". Indian Express. Archived from the original on 16 February 2021.
- "Mahindra Scorpio TOISA: Gaurav Bidhuri wins Boxer of the Year award". The Times of India. 27 February 2018. Archived from the original on 12 September 2018.
- "Indian boxer Gaurav Bidhuri trying his hand at cutting hair". Times of India. 15 April 2020.
- Waris, Sarah (27 December 2019). "Boxer Gaurav Bidhuri questions exclusion from Olympic qualifiers' trial". The Bridge. Archived from the original on 5 June 2021.
