= Mojtaba Karimfar =

Iranian wrestler (born 1987)

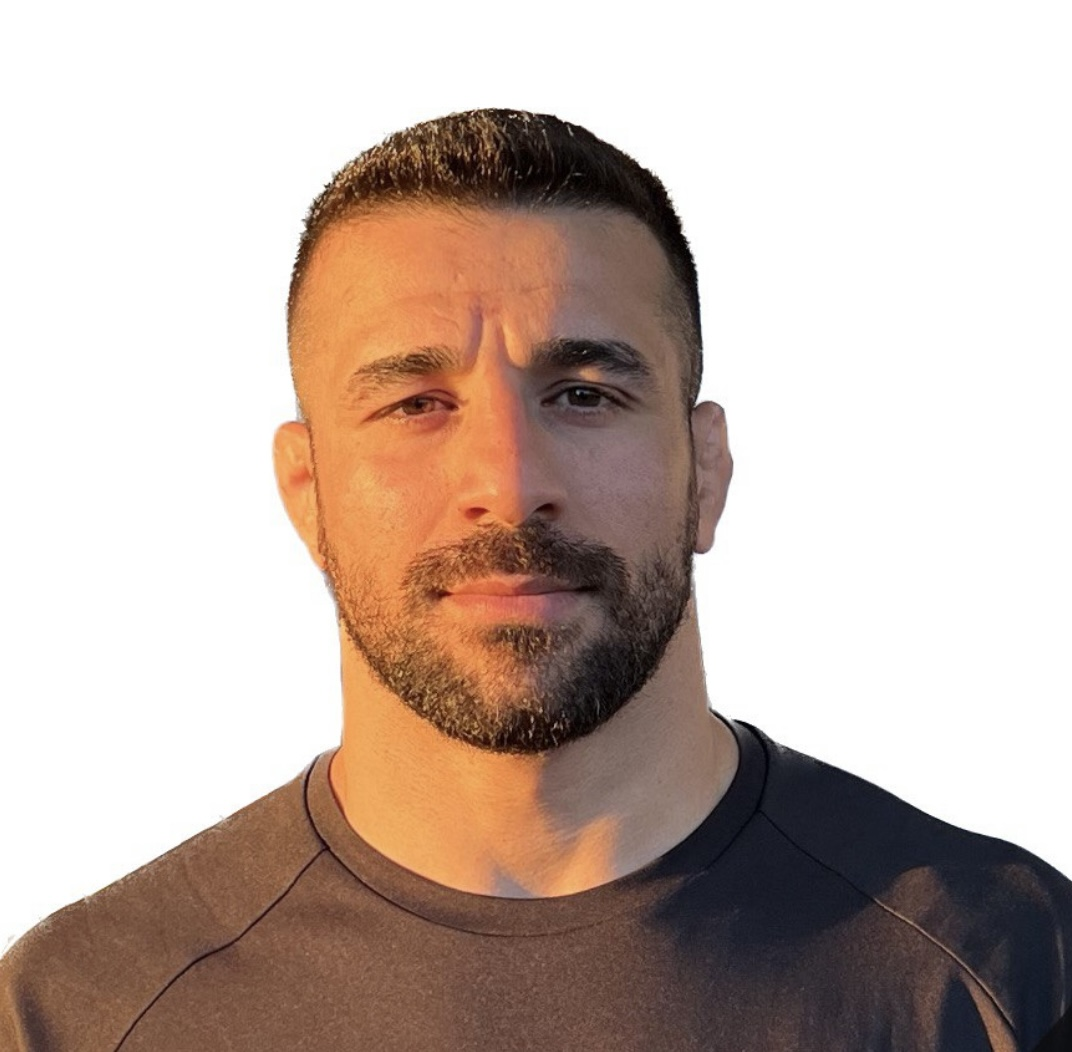

Personal information
- Native name: مجتبی کریم فر
- Full name: Mojtaba Karimfar
- Nationality: Iran
- Born: December 8, 1987 (age 38) Andimeshk, Iran
- Height: 180 cm (5 ft 11 in)
- Weight: 92 kg (203 lb)

Sport
- Country: Iran
- Sport: Wrestling

Achievements and titles
- Highest world ranking: 10th
Medal record
Representing Iran
Men's Greco-Roman wrestling
Asian Games
Bronze medal – third place	2014 Incheon	85 kg
Asian Championships
Bronze medal – third place	2014 Astana	85 kg
World Cup
Bronze medal – third place	2015 Tehran	85 kg
World Military Championship
Bronze medal – third place	2013 Tehran	84 kg
Golden Grand Prix
Bronze medal – third place	2015 Baku	85 kg
Grand Prix
Silver medal – second place	2015 Semey	85 kg
Gold medal – first place	2015 Madrid	85 kg
Silver medal – second place	2014 Gdansk	85 kg
Yadegare Imam Cup
Bronze medal – third place	2011 Qom	84 kg
Gold medal – first place	2013 Tehran	84 kg
Gold medal – first place	2014 Tehran	85 kg

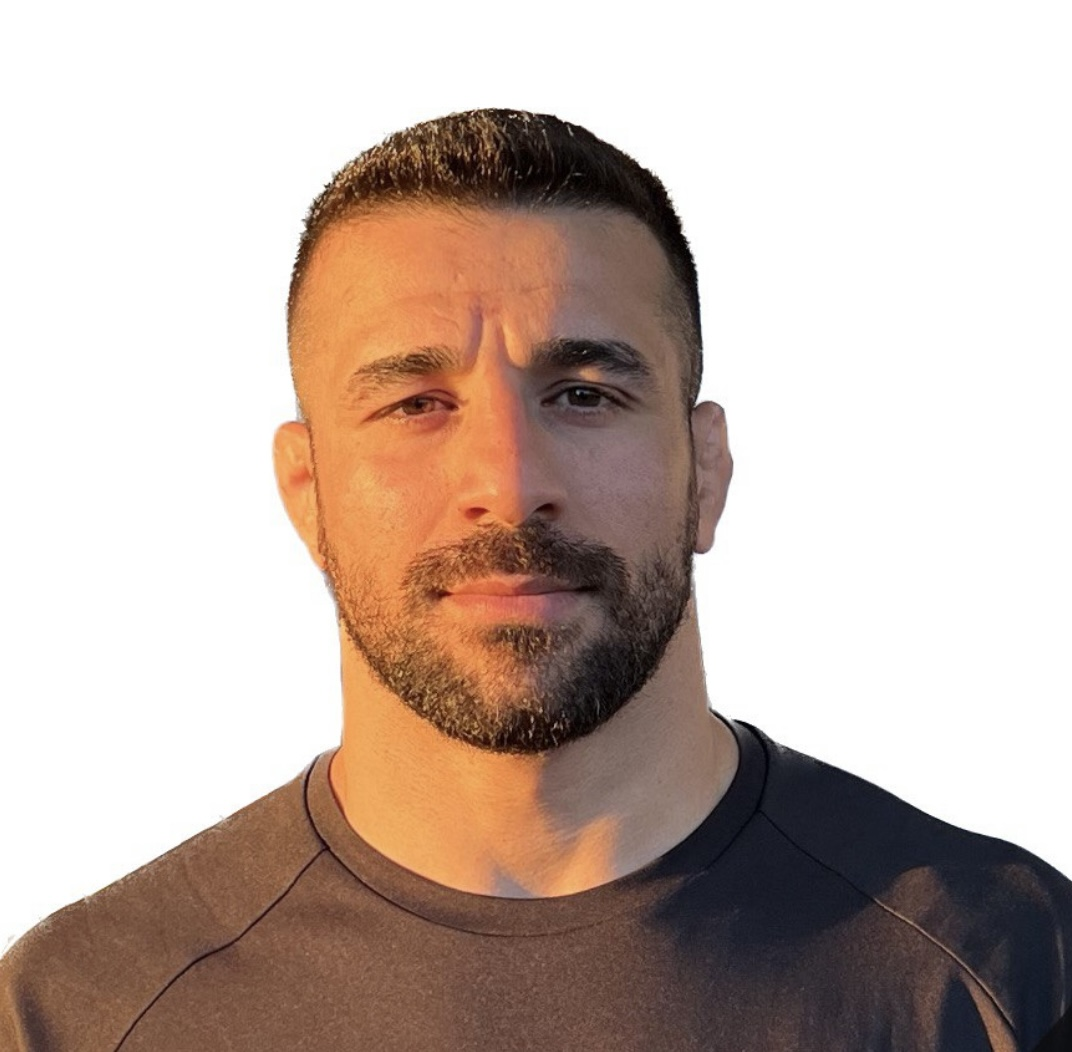
Mojtaba Karimfar

Mojtaba Karimfar (Persian: مجتبی کریم‌فر, born 8 December 1987 in Andimeshk) is an Iranian wrestler. He won a bronze medal at the 2014 Asian Games.
