= Zhang Hongpeng =

Chinese canoeist

Zhang Hongpeng (15 July 1987, Anda, China) is a Chinese sprint canoeist. At the 2012 Summer Olympics, he competed in the Men's K-4 1000 metres, finishing in 8th place with the team in the semifinal.
