= Iraq at the 2014 Asian Games =

- IOC code: IRQ
- NOC: National Olympic Committee of Iraq

in Incheon
- Competitors: 63 in 8 sports
- Flag bearer: Younis Mahmoud
- Medals Ranked 25th: Gold 1 Silver 0 Bronze 3 Total 4

Asian Games appearances (overview)
- 1974; 1978; 1982; 1986; 1990–2002; 2006; 2010; 2014; 2018; 2022; 2026

Iraq participated in the 2014 Asian Games in Incheon, South Korea from 19 September to 4 October 2014.

== Medal summary ==
=== Medal by sport ===
Medals by sport
Sport	1st place, gold medalist(s)	2nd place, silver medalist(s)	3rd place, bronze medalist(s)	Total
Athletics	1	0	1	2
Football	0	0	1	1
Weightlifting	0	0	1	1
Total	1	0	3	4

=== Medalists ===
Medal	Name	Sport	Event	Date
Gold	Adnan Taess	Athletics	Men's 800 metres	1 Oct
Bronze	Karrar Mohammed	Weightlifting	Weightlifting at the 2014 Asian Games – Men's 69 kg	22 Sep
Bronze	Adnan Taess	Athletics	Men's 1500 metres	29 Sep
Bronze	Iraq national under-23 football team: Ali Yaseen; Mahdi Karim; Ali Bahjat; Mustafa Nadhim; Saad Natiq; Ali Adnan; Saad Abdul-Amir; Saif Salman; Dhurgham Ismail; Younis Mahmoud; Humam Tariq; Jalal Hasan; Sameh Saeed; Amjad Kalaf; Salam Shaker; Marwan Hussein; Farhan Shakor; Bashar Rasan; Mahdi Kamel; Mohammed Hameed	Football	Men's tournament	2 Oct

Last updated 27 August 2016

== Archery ==
Men's recurve

Athlete	Event	Qualification		1/32 elimination	1/16 elimination	1/8 elimination	Quarterfinals	Semifinals	Final	Rank
Athlete	Event	Score	Seed	Opposition Score	Opposition Score	Opposition Score	Opposition Score	Opposition Score	Opposition Score	Rank
Mohammed Mahmood	Individual	1193	50 Q	Jigme Norbu (BHU); W 6–2	Oh Jin-hyek (KOR); L 1–7	did not advance				

Women's recurve

Athlete	Event	Qualification		1/32 elimination	1/16 elimination	1/8 elimination	Quarterfinals	Semifinals	Final	Rank
Athlete	Event	Score	Seed	Opposition Score	Opposition Score	Opposition Score	Opposition Score	Opposition Score	Opposition Score	Rank
Rand Saad	Individual	1228	41 Q	—N/a	Kaori Kawanaka (JPN); L 1–7	did not advance				

Men's compound

Athlete	Event	Qualification		1/32 elimination	1/16 elimination	1/8 elimination	Quarterfinals	Semifinals	Final	Rank
Athlete	Event	Score	Seed	Opposition Score	Opposition Score	Opposition Score	Opposition Score	Opposition Score	Opposition Score	Rank
Eshaq Ibrahim	Individual	686	22 Q	Bye	Juwaidi Marzuki (MAS); W 144–141	Esmaeil Ebadi (IRI); L 142–149	did not advance			
Waleed Hameed	Individual	668	39 Q	Bye	Chen Po-kai (TPE); L 127–146	did not advance				
Abdullah Ali	Individual	633	52	did not advance						
Abdullah Ali; Waleed Hameed; Eshaq Ibrahim	Team	1987	11 Q	—N/a		Malaysia; L 220–230	did not advance			

Women's compound

Athlete	Event	Qualification		1/32 elimination	1/16 elimination	1/8 elimination	Quarterfinals	Semifinals	Final	Rank
Athlete	Event	Score	Seed	Opposition Score	Opposition Score	Opposition Score	Opposition Score	Opposition Score	Opposition Score	Rank
Fatimah Saad	Individual	681	10 Q	—N/a	Bye	Sri Ranti (INA); L 138–143	did not advance			

== Athletics (track and field) ==
Key

- Note–Ranks given for track events are within the athlete's heat only
- Q = Qualified for the next round
- q = Qualified for the next round as a fastest loser or, in field events, by position without achieving the qualifying target
- NR = National record
- N/A = Round not applicable for the event
- Bye = Athlete not required to compete in round

Men
Track & road events

Athlete	Event	Heat		Semifinal		Final	
Athlete	Event	Result	Rank	Result	Rank	Result	Rank
Hasanain Abd Ali	200 m	21.86	5 Q	—	DSQ	Did not advance	
Mohammed Jumaah	200 m	21.42	3 Q	21.81	4	Did not advance	
Maytham Al-Juaifari	400 m	47.10	3 Q	47.23	7	Did not advance	
Adnan Taess	800 m	1:49.03	3 Q	—N/a		1:47.48	1st place, gold medalist(s)
Adnan Taess	1500 m	3:45.04	2 Q	—N/a		3:42.50	3rd place, bronze medalist(s)
Ameer Shakir Aneed	110 m hurdles	13.91	5	—N/a		did not advance	
Mustafa Ammar Shaheen	400 m hurdles	51.15	5	—N/a		did not advance	
Maytham Al-Juaifari; Karar Al-Abbody; Mohammed Al-Tameemi; Mohammed Hasan Jumaah	4 × 400 m relay	3:11.44	5	—N/a		did not advance	

Field events

Athlete	Event	Final	
Athlete	Event	Distance	Position
Muntadher Faleh Abdulwahid	Pole vault	5.25	6
Mustafa Dagher Al-Saamah	Discus throw	55.21	10

Women
Track & road events

Athlete	Event	Heat		Semifinal		Final	
Athlete	Event	Result	Rank	Result	Rank	Result	Rank
Dana Hussain	200 m	24.38	4	—N/a		Did not advance	
Dana Hussain	400 m	54.78	5	—N/a		Did not advance	

== Boxing ==
Men

Athlete	Event	Preliminaries 1	Preliminaries 2	Quarterfinals	Semifinals	Final	
Athlete	Event	Opposition Result	Opposition Result	Opposition Result	Opposition Result	Opposition Result	Rank
Hassan Ali	Light flyweight	Bye	Osmonov (KGZ); L 0–3	did not advance			
Murtadha Raad	Flyweight	Bye	Usenaliev (KGZ); L 0–3	did not advance			
Ammar Jabbar	Lightweight	Wangchuk (BHU); W 3–0	Sadiq (QAT); W 3–0	Suarez (PHI); L 0–3	did not advance		
Karra Radhim	Light welterweight	Bye	Dilshan (SRI); W 3–0	Bebitov (TKM); L 0–3	did not advance		
Waheed Abdul-Ridha	Middleweight	Kim (KOR); W 3–0	Lopez (PHI); L 0–3	did not advance			

== Canoeing ==
=== Sprint ===
Men

Athlete	Event	Heats		Semifinals		Final	
Athlete	Event	Time	Rank	Time	Rank	Time	Rank
Ahmed Sameer	K-1 200 m	34.939	4 Q	37.634	2 Q	37.410	8
Tareq Farooq	K-1 1000 m	4:11.074	6 Q	4:01.511	5	Did not advance	

== Football ==
=== Men's tournament ===
Team roster

Head coach: Hakeem Shaker

No.	Pos.	Player	Date of birth (age)	Club
1	GK	Ali Yaseen	9 August 1993 (aged 21)	(Iraq Football Association) Naft Al-Janoob
2	MF	Mahdi Karim	10 December 1983 (aged 30)	(Iraq Football Association) Al-Shorta
3	DF	Ali Bahjat	3 March 1992 (aged 22)	(Iraq Football Association) Al-Shorta
4	DF	Mustafa Nadhim	23 September 1993 (aged 20)	(Iraq Football Association) Al-Quwa Al-Jawiya
5	DF	Saad Natiq	19 March 1994 (aged 20)	(Iraq Football Association) Al-Quwa Al-Jawiya
6	DF	Ali Adnan	19 December 1993 (aged 20)	(Turkish Football Federation) Çaykur Rizespor
7	MF	Saad Abdul-Amir	19 January 1992 (aged 22)	(Iraq Football Association) Erbil
8	MF	Saif Salman	1 July 1993 (aged 21)	(Iraq Football Association) Al-Quwa Al-Jawiya
9	DF	Dhurgham Ismail	23 May 1994 (aged 20)	(Iraq Football Association) Al-Shorta
10	FW	Younis Mahmoud	3 February 1983 (aged 31)	(Saudi Arabian Football Federation) Al-Ahli
11	MF	Humam Tariq	10 February 1996 (aged 18)	(United Arab Emirates Football Association) Al-Ahli
12	GK	Jalal Hasan	18 May 1991 (aged 23)	(Iraq Football Association) Erbil
13	DF	Sameh Saeed	26 May 1992 (aged 22)	(Iraq Football Association) Baghdad
14	FW	Amjad Kalaf	5 October 1991 (aged 22)	(Iraq Football Association) Al-Shorta
15	DF	Salam Shaker	31 July 1986 (aged 28)	(Iraq Football Association) Al-Shorta
16	FW	Marwan Hussein	26 January 1992 (aged 22)	(Iraq Football Association) Al-Shorta
17	FW	Farhan Shakor	15 October 1995 (aged 18)	(Iraq Football Association) Al-Zawra'a
18	MF	Bashar Rasan	22 December 1996 (aged 17)	(Iraq Football Association) Al-Quwa Al-Jawiya
19	MF	Mahdi Kamel	6 January 1995 (aged 19)	(Iraq Football Association) Al-Shorta
20	GK	Mohammed Hameed	24 January 1993 (aged 21)	(Iraq Football Association) Al-Shorta

Group play

Pos	Team	Pld	W	D	L	GF	GA	GD	Pts
1	Iraq	3	3	0	0	10	1	+9	9
2	Japan	3	2	0	1	9	4	+5	6
3	Kuwait	3	1	0	2	6	7	−1	3
4	Nepal	3	0	0	3	0	13	−13	0

Source: RSSSF
14 September
14:00

Iraq	4–0	Nepal
Rasan 5'; Mahmoud 45+1'; Chand 85' (o.g.); Bahjat 90+2'	Report

Football Stadium, Incheon
Referee: Ma Ning (China)

17 September
20:00

Japan	1–3	Iraq
Nakajima 36'	Report	Tariq 12'; Adnan 48', 72'

Goyang Stadium, Goyang
Referee: Charymurat Kurbanov (Turkmenistan)

21 September
14:00

Kuwait	0–3	Iraq
	Report	Tariq 16', 62'; Hussein 71'

Hwaseong Stadium, Hwaseong
Referee: Abdullah Balideh (Qatar)

Round of 16

26 September
16:00

Iraq	4–2	Tajikistan
Tariq 7'; Shaker 47'; Adnan 62'; Nadhim 84'	Report	Vasiev 37'; Fatkhuloev 88'

Football Stadium, Incheon
Referee: Ko Hyung-jin (South Korea)

Quarterfinal

28 September
17:00

Saudi Arabia	0–3	Iraq
	Report	Mahmoud 10', 29'; Al-Shamekh 49' (o.g.)

Goyang Stadium, Goyang
Referee: Ahmed Al-Kaf (Oman)

Semifinal

30 September
17:00

Iraq	0–1 (a.e.t.)	North Korea
	Report	Jong Il-gwan 96'

Football Stadium, Incheon
Referee: Ma Ning (China)

Bronze medal match

2 October
17:00

Thailand	0–1	Iraq (bronze)
	Report	Mahmoud 62'

Football Stadium, Incheon
Referee: Ko Hyung-jin (South Korea)

== Rowing ==
Men

Athlete	Event	Heats		Repechage		Semifinals		Final	
Athlete	Event	Time	Rank	Time	Rank	Time	Rank	Time	Rank
Ahmed Hussein; Nameer Abdul-Ridha; Mohammed Riyadh; Anas Ajeel	Quadruple sculls	6:21.36	3 R	6:15.13	4 FB	—N/a		6:23.45	2

Qualification Legend: FA=Final A (medal); FB=Final B (non-medal); FC=Final C (non-medal); FD=Final D (non-medal); FE=Final E (non-medal); FF=Final F (non-medal); SA/B=Semifinals A/B; SC/D=Semifinals C/D; SE/F=Semifinals E/F; QF=Quarterfinals; R=Repechage

== Weightlifting ==
Men

Athlete	Event	Snatch		Clean & Jerk		Total	Rank
Athlete	Event	Result	Rank	Result	Rank	Total	Rank
Karrar Mohammed	−69 kg	148	3	177	3	325	3rd place, bronze medalist(s)
Ahmed Farooq	−77 kg	140	10	178	5	318	9
Raad Ameen	−85 kg	~~155~~	DNF	—	—	—	DNF
Salwan Jassim	−105 kg	181	3	210	4	391	4
Mohammed Jassim	+105 kg	210	9	221	7	391	DSQ^{1}

1. Mohammed Jassim originally finished 7th, but was disqualified after he tested positive for Etiocholanolone.

== Wrestling ==
Key:

- VT – Victory by fall.
- PP – Decision by points – the loser with technical points.
- PO – Decision by points – the loser without technical points.
- ST – Great superiority – the loser without technical points and a margin of victory of at least 8 (Greco-Roman) or 10 (freestyle) points.

Men's freestyle

Athlete	Event	1/8 Finals	Quarterfinal	Semifinal	Repechage 1	Repechage 2	Final / BM	
Athlete	Event	Opposition Result	Opposition Result	Opposition Result	Opposition Result	Opposition Result	Opposition Result	Rank
Mohammed Sabah	−125 kg	Bye	Arakida (JPN); L 4–11^{F}	did not advance				8

Men's Greco-Roman

Athlete	Event	1/8 Finals	Quarterfinal	Semifinal	Repechage 1	Repechage 2	Final / BM	
Athlete	Event	Opposition Result	Opposition Result	Opposition Result	Opposition Result	Opposition Result	Opposition Result	Rank
Mohammed Abbas	−59 kg	Arrar (JOR); W 9–0	Kebispayev (KAZ); L 0–8	did not advance				8
Ahmed Juma	−66 kg	Bye	Ri (PRK); L 0–6	did not advance				9
Taha Yaseen	−71 kg	Uulu (KGZ); L 2–5 ^{F}	did not advance					9
Ali Nadhim	−130 kg	Bye	Meng Q (CHN); L 0–8	did not advance				9
