= Sündeviin Byambatseren =

Mongolian freestyle wrestler (born 1990)

Personal information
- Nationality: (Mongolia) Mongol
- Born: Mongolia

Sport
- Sport: Wrestling
- Event: Freestyle
Medal record
Women's freestyle wrestling
Representing Mongolia
Asian Games
Silver medal – second place	2014 Incheon	55 kg
Asian Wrestling Championships
Bronze medal – third place	2010 New Delhi	55 kg
FILA World Team Championships
Silver medal – second place	2013 Mongolia	-55 kg

Sündeviin Byambatseren (born 24 March 1990, in Ömnögovi Province) is a Mongolian freestyle wrestler. She competed in the freestyle 55 kg event at the 2012 Summer Olympics and was eliminated by Sofia Mattsson in the qualifications.
