= Tagou Martial Arts School =

- 塔沟武术学校
- Zhengzhou, Dengfeng, Henan; China

Information
- Other name: 塔沟武校
- Type: Public
- Motto: 认真学，刻苦练，勿执门派，悉归一宗，以继承发扬中华武术瑰宝为己任，益智强身，习气励志，百尺竿头精进，报效祖国，匡扶正义。 (Learn diligently, practice assiduously, do not be bound by any particular school, but return to the same source, take it as your responsibility to inherit and promote the treasure of Chinese martial arts, improve your intelligence and body, cultivate good habits and inspire ambition, strive for continuous improvement, serve your country, and uphold justice.)
- Established: March 5, 1978
- School number: 36000 with teachers
- Website: http://www.shaolintagou.org

Tagou Martial Arts School is one of China's largest martial arts schools. It was built in 1978. It was featured in the movie The Real Shaolin.
