= Uzbekistan at the 2014 Asian Games =

- IOC code: UZB
- NOC: National Olympic Committee of the Republic of Uzbekistan

in Incheon
- Flag bearer: Rishod Sobirov
- Medals Ranked 11th: Gold 9 Silver 14 Bronze 22 Total 45

Asian Games appearances (overview)
- 1994; 1998; 2002; 2006; 2010; 2014; 2018; 2022; 2026

Uzbekistan participated in the 2014 Asian Games in Incheon, South Korea from 19 September to 4 October 2014.

== Medal summary ==
=== Medal table ===
| Sport | Gold | Silver | Bronze | Total |
|---|---|---|---|---|
| Wrestling | 3 | 1 | 3 | 7 |
| Athletics | 2 | 2 | 3 | 7 |
| Canoeing | 2 | 1 | 2 | 5 |
| Gymnastics | 1 | 3 | 1 | 5 |
| Taekwondo | 1 | 3 | 0 | 4 |
| Boxing | 0 | 2 | 2 | 4 |
| Judo | 0 | 1 | 4 | 5 |
| Karate | 0 | 1 | 2 | 3 |
| Weightlifting | 0 | 0 | 3 | 3 |
| Swimming | 0 | 0 | 1 | 1 |
| Tennis | 0 | 0 | 1 | 1 |
| Total | 9 | 14 | 22 | 45 |

=== Medalists ===
| Medal | Name | Sport | Event |
|---|---|---|---|
| Gold | Svetlana Radzivil | Athletics | Women's high jump |
| Gold | Ekaterina Voronina | Athletics | Women's heptathlon |
| Gold | Vadim Menkov | Canoeing | Men's C-1 1000 metres |
| Gold | Aleksey Mochalov | Canoeing | Men's K-1 1000 metres |
| Gold | Valeriya Davidova; Ravilya Farkhutdinova; Djamila Rakhmatova; Anastasiya Serdyukova | Gymnastics | Women's rhythmic team |
| Gold | Jasur Baykuziyev | Taekwondo | Men's 87 kg |
| Gold | Bekzod Abdurakhmonov | Wrestling | Men's freestyle 70 kg |
| Gold | Rashid Kurbanov | Wrestling | Men's freestyle 74 kg |
| Gold | Rustam Assakalov | Wrestling | Men's Greco-Roman 85 kg |
| Silver | Leonid Andreev | Athletics | Men's decathlon |
| Silver | Aleksandra Kotlyarova | Athletics | Women's triple jump |
| Silver | Shakhobidin Zoirov | Boxing | Men's 52 kg |
| Silver | Israil Madrimov | Boxing | Men's 69 kg |
| Silver | Ernest Irnazarov | Canoeing | Men's K-1 200 metres |
| Silver | Abdulla Azimov | Gymnastics | Men's pommel horse |
| Silver | Anton Fokin | Gymnastics | Men's parallel bars |
| Silver | Oksana Chusovitina | Gymnastics | Women's vault |
| Silver | Dilshod Choriev | Judo | Men's 90 kg |
| Silver | Barno Mirzaeva | Karate | Women's kumite 61 kg |
| Silver | Nikita Rafalovich | Taekwondo | Men's 74 kg |
| Silver | Maksim Rafalovich | Taekwondo | Men's 80 kg |
| Silver | Dmitriy Shokin | Taekwondo | Men's +87 kg |
| Silver | Dilshod Turdiev | Wrestling | Men's Greco-Roman 71 kg |
| Bronze | Ivan Zaytsev | Athletics | Men's javelin throw |
| Bronze | Nadiya Dusanova | Athletics | Women's high jump |
| Bronze | Yuliya Tarasova | Athletics | Women's heptathlon |
| Bronze | Oybek Mamazulunov | Boxing | Men's 81 kg |
| Bronze | Mirzohid Abdullaev | Boxing | Men's +91 kg |
| Bronze | Serik Mirbekov; Gerasim Kochnev | Canoeing | Men's C-2 1000 metres |
| Bronze | Sergey Borzov; Vyacheslav Gorn; Aleksey Mochalov; Aleksandr Tropin | Canoeing | Men's K-4 1000 metres |
| Bronze | Anastasiya Serdyukova | Gymnastics | Women's rhythmic individual all-around |
| Bronze | Mirzohid Farmonov | Judo | Men's 66 kg |
| Bronze | Ramziddin Sayidov | Judo | Men's 100 kg |
| Bronze | Abdullo Tangriev | Judo | Men's +100 kg |
| Bronze | Mirzohid Farmonov; Rishod Sobirov; Navruz Jurakobilov; Sarvar Shomurodov; Yakhyo Imamov; Dilshod Choriev; Soyib Kurbonov; Abdullo Tangriev | Judo | Men's team |
| Bronze | Gofurjon Zokhidov | Karate | Men's kumite 75 kg |
| Bronze | Shakhboz Akhatov | Karate | Men's kumite 84 kg |
| Bronze | Daniil Bukin; Vladislav Mustafin; Islam Aslanov; Khurshidjon Tursunov; Dmitriy Shvetsov; Aleksey Derlyugov; Daniil Tulupov | Swimming | Men's 4 × 100 metre medley relay |
| Bronze | Farrukh Dustov; Sanjar Fayziev; Temur Ismailov; Denis Istomin | Tennis | Men's team |
| Bronze | Ulugbek Alimov | Weightlifting | Men's 85 kg |
| Bronze | Sardorbek Dusmurotov | Weightlifting | Men's 105 kg |
| Bronze | Mahliyo Togoeva | Weightlifting | Women's 48 kg |
| Bronze | Ikhtiyor Navruzov | Wrestling | Men's freestyle 65 kg |
| Bronze | Umidjon Ismanov | Wrestling | Men's freestyle 86 kg |
| Bronze | Besiki Saldadze | Wrestling | Men's Greco-Roman 80 kg |
