= Dowon Gymnasium =

Indoor arena facility in Incheon, South Korea

Dowon Gymnasium 도원실내체육관
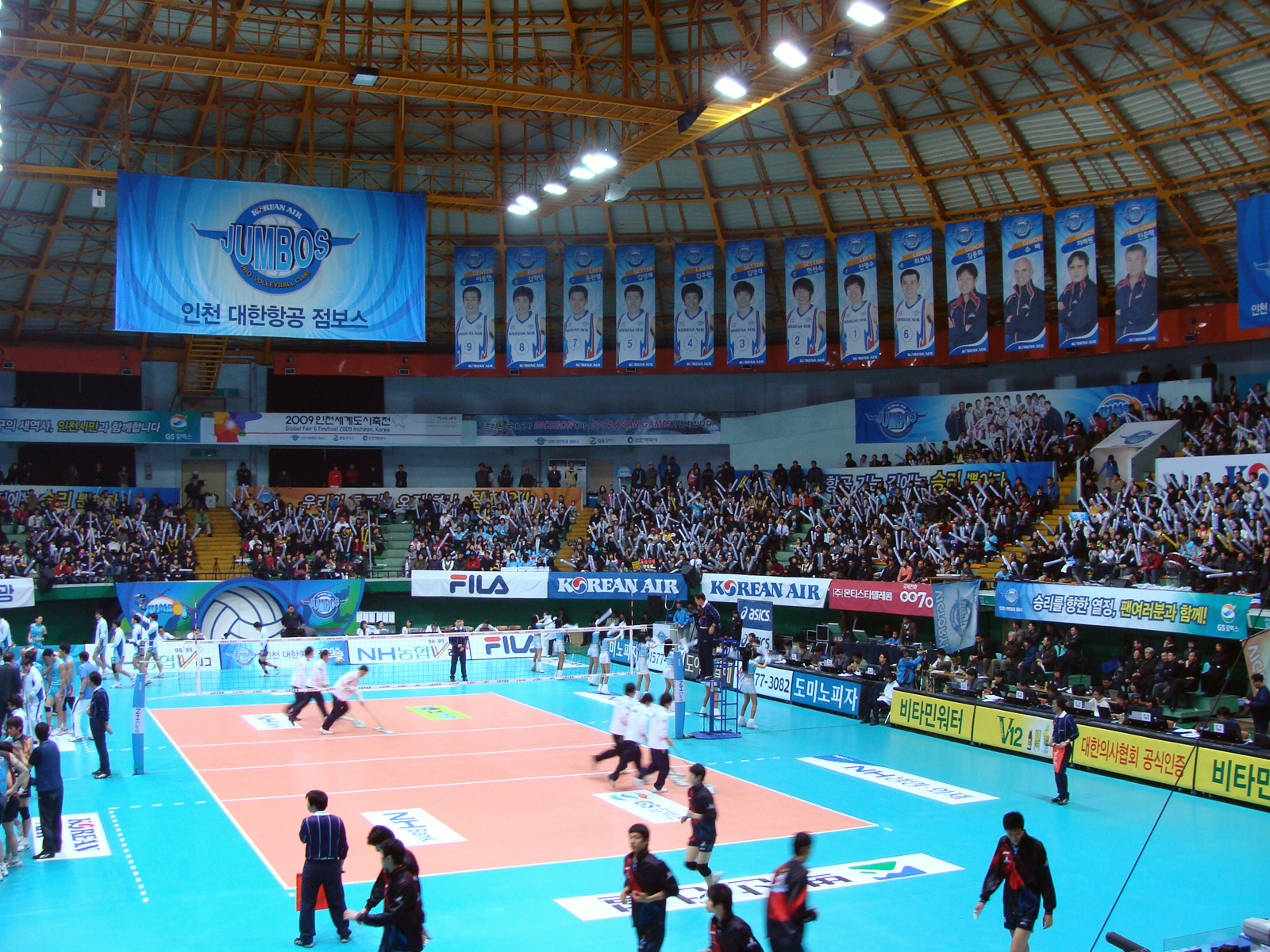
- Interactive map of Dowon Gymnasium 도원실내체육관
- Location: Jung District, Incheon, South Korea
- Capacity: 2,667

Construction
- Built: 1969-1975
- Opened: September 1975

- Dowon Gymnasium
- Hangul: 도원실내체육관
- Hanja: 桃源室內體育館
- RR: Dowon sillae cheyukgwan
- MR: Towŏn sillae ch'eyukkwan

Dowon Gymnasium is an indoor arena facility located in Incheon, South Korea, which has hosted various international sports competitions. It was the venue for judo and wrestling competitions of 2014 Asian Games. It is the home stadium of the Incheon Korean Air Jumbos.
