= China at the 2014 Asian Games =

- IOC code: CHN
- NOC: Chinese Olympic Committee external link (in Chinese and English)

in Incheon
- Competitors: 880
- Flag bearer: Lei Sheng
- Medals Ranked 1st: Gold 151 Silver 109 Bronze 85 Total 345

Asian Games appearances (overview)
- 1974; 1978; 1982; 1986; 1990; 1994; 1998; 2002; 2006; 2010; 2014; 2018; 2022; 2026

China participated in the 2014 Asian Games in Incheon, South Korea from 19 September to 4 October 2014.

== Medal summary ==
=== Medal table ===
Sport	Gold	Silver	Bronze	Total
Shooting	27	17	6	50
Swimming	22	12	13	47
Athletics	15	14	11	40
Diving	10	6	0	16
Wushu	10	1	1	12
Gymnastics	9	7	3	19
Rowing	9	0	1	10
Weightlifting	7	5	2	14
Table tennis	6	4	0	10
Cycling	5	6	5	16
Canoeing	5	4	5	14
Badminton	4	3	2	9
Fencing	3	4	5	12
Sailing	3	2	2	7
Modern pentathlon	3	0	1	4
Synchronized swimming	3	0	0	3
Taekwondo	2	4	3	9
Wrestling	1	3	5	9
Archery	1	2	1	4
Tennis	1	2	1	4
Boxing	1	2	0	3
Judo	1	1	3	5
Beach volleyball	1	1	2	4
Water polo	1	0	1	2
Rugby sevens	1	0	0	1
Soft tennis	0	2	4	6
Karate	0	2	2	4
Basketball	0	1	0	1
Bowling	0	1	0	1
Equestrian	0	1	0	1
Field hockey	0	1	0	1
Volleyball	0	1	0	1
Triathlon	0	0	3	3
Golf	0	0	1	1
Sepaktakraw	0	0	1	1
Softball	0	0	1	1
Totals (36 entries)	151	109	85	345

=== Medalists ===
Medal	Name	Sport	Event
Gold	Gu Xuesong; Qi Kaiyao; Yong Zhiwei	Archery	Men's Team
Gold	Xie Wenjun	Athletics	Men's 110 m hurdles
Gold	Wang Zhen	Athletics	Men's 20 kilometres walk
Gold	Mo Youxue; Xie Zhenye; Su Bingtian; Zhang Peimeng; Yang Yang; Chen Shiwei	Athletics	Men's 4 × 100 m relay
Gold	Xue Changrui	Athletics	Men's Pole vault
Gold	Li Jinzhe	Athletics	Men's Long jump
Gold	Cao Shuo	Athletics	Men's Triple jump
Gold	Zhao Qinggang	Athletics	Men's Javelin throw
Gold	Wei Yongli	Athletics	Women's 100 m
Gold	Wu Shuijiao	Athletics	Women's 100 m hurdles
Gold	Lu Xiuzhi	Athletics	Women's 20 kilometres walk
Gold	Tao Yujia; Kong Lingwei; Lin Huijun; Wei Yongli	Athletics	Women's 4 × 100 m relay
Gold	Li Ling	Athletics	Women's Pole vault
Gold	Zhang Wenxiu	Athletics	Women's Hammer throw
Gold	Zhang Li	Athletics	Women's Javelin throw
Gold	Lin Dan	Badminton	Men's Singles
Gold	Wang Yihan	Badminton	Women's Singles
Gold	Li Xuerui; Tian Qing; Zhao Yunlei; Wang Shixian; Yu Yang; Wang Xiaoli; Wang Yihan; Liu Xin; Bao Yixin; Ma Jin	Badminton	Women's team
Gold	Zhang Nan; Zhao Yunlei	Badminton	Mixed doubles
Gold	Yin Junhua	Boxing	Women's 60 kg
Gold	Cen Nanqin	Canoeing	Women's slalom C1
Gold	Li Tong	Canoeing	Women's slalom K1
Gold	Li Qiang	Canoeing	Men's C1 200 m
Gold	Zhou Yu	Canoeing	Women's K1 500 m
Gold	Ren Wenjun; Ma Qing; Jieyi Huang; Liu Haiping	Canoeing	Women's K4 500 m
Gold	Zhong Tianshi; Gong Jinjie	Cycling	Women's team sprint
Gold	Zhao Baofang; Huang Dongyan; Jiang Wenwen; Jing Yali	Cycling	Women's team pursuit
Gold	Yuan Zhong; Shen Pingan; Qin Chenlu; Liu Hao	Cycling	Men's team pursuit
Gold	Wang Zhen	Cycling	Men's Cross-country
Gold	Shi Qinglan	Cycling	Women's Cross-country
Gold	He Chao	Diving	Men's 1 m springboard
Gold	Cao Yuan	Diving	Men's 3 m springboard
Gold	Qiu Bo	Diving	Men's 10 m platform
Gold	Cao Yuan; Lin Yue	Diving	Men's 3 m synchronized springboard
Gold	Chen Aisen; Zhang Yanquan	Diving	Men's 10 m synchronized platform
Gold	Shi Tingmao	Diving	Women's 1 m springboard
Gold	He Zi	Diving	Women's 3 m springboard
Gold	Si Yajie	Diving	Women's 10 m platform
Gold	Shi Tingmao; Wu Minxia	Diving	Women's 3 m synchronized springboard
Gold	Chen Ruolin; Liu Huixia	Diving	Women's 10 m synchronized platform
Gold	Ma Jianfei	Fencing	Men's individual foil
Gold	Sun Yujie	Fencing	Women's individual épée
Gold	Sun Yiwen; Sun Yujie; Xu Anqi; Hao Jialu	Fencing	Women's team épée
Gold	Zou Kai	Gymnastics	Men's floor
Gold	Zou Kai	Gymnastics	Men's horizontal bar
Gold	Liao Junlin	Gymnastics	Men's rings
Gold	Bai Yawen; Chen Siyi; Huang Huidan; Shang Chunsong; Tan Jiaxin; Yao Jinnan	Gymnastics	Women's artistic team
Gold	Yao Jinnan	Gymnastics	Women's individual all-around
Gold	Yao Jinnan	Gymnastics	Women's uneven bars
Gold	Yao Jinnan	Gymnastics	Women's floor
Gold	Dong Dong	Gymnastics	Men's trampoline
Gold	Li Dan	Gymnastics	Women's trampoline
Gold	Ma Sisi	Judo	Women's +78 kg
Gold	Guo Jianli	Modern pentathlon	Men's individual
Gold	Guo Jianli; Han Jiahao; Su Haihang; Zhang Linbin	Modern pentathlon	Men's team
Gold	Chen Qian	Modern pentathlon	Women's individual
Gold	Zhang Liang; Dai Jun	Rowing	Men's double sculls
Gold	Ma Jian; Liu Zhiyu; Liu Dang; Zhang Quan	Rowing	Men's quadruple sculls
Gold	Cheng Xunman; Yang Dongdong; Zhao Longjie; Feng Jiahui; Ni Xulin; Liu Hang; Yang Zengxin; Li Dongjian; Zhang Shetian	Rowing	Men's eight
Gold	Yu Chenggang; Li Hui; Fan Junjie; Wang Tiexin	Rowing	Men's lightweight quadruple sculls
Gold	Duan Jingli; Lü Yang	Rowing	Women's double sculls
Gold	Wang Min; Shen Xiaoxing; Wang Yuwei; Zhang Xinyue	Rowing	Women's quadruple sculls
Gold	Zhang Min; Miao Tian	Rowing	Women's coxless pair
Gold	Zhang Huan; Chen Le	Rowing	Women's lightweight double sculls
Gold	Guo Shuai; Pan Dandan; Chen Cuiming; Huang Wenyi	Rowing	Women's lightweight quadruple sculls
Gold	Guan Qishi; Liu Yang; Yu Xiaoming; Sun Tingting; Lu Yuanyuan; Sun Shichao; Zhou Lilian; Yang Hong; Yang Min; Chen Keyi; Jiang Qianqian; Yu Liping	Rugby sevens	Women
Gold	Wang Aichen	Sailing	Men's RS:X
Gold	Weng Qiaoshan	Sailing	Women's RS:One
Gold	Zhang Dongshuang	Sailing	Women's Laser Radial
Gold	Ding Feng; Jin Yongde; Li Chuanlin	Shooting	Men's 25 metre center fire pistol team
Gold	Ding Feng	Shooting	Men's 25 metre standard pistol
Gold	Ding Feng; Jin Yongde; Li Chuanlin	Shooting	Men's 25 metre standard pistol team
Gold	Pang Wei; Pu Qifeng; Wang Zhiwei	Shooting	Men's 50 metre pistol team
Gold	Yang Haoran	Shooting	Men's 10 metre air rifle
Gold	Cao Yifei; Liu Tianyou; Yang Haoran	Shooting	Men's 10 metre air rifle team
Gold	Zhao Shengbo	Shooting	Men's 50 metre rifle prone
Gold	Lan Xing; Liu Gang; Zhao Shengbo	Shooting	Men's 50 metre rifle prone team
Gold	Cao Yifei	Shooting	Men's 50 metre rifle three positions
Gold	Cao Yifei; Kang Hongwei; Zhu Qinan	Shooting	Men's 50 metre rifle three positions team
Gold	Zhai Yujia	Shooting	Men's 10 metre running target
Gold	Gan Yu; Zhai Yujia; Zhang Jie	Shooting	Men's 10 metre running target team
Gold	Xie Durun; Zhai Yujia; Zhang Jie	Shooting	Men's 10 metre running target mixed team
Gold	Gao Bo	Shooting	Men's trap
Gold	Du Yu; Gao Bo; Zhang Yiyao	Shooting	Men's trap team
Gold	Hu Binyuan	Shooting	Men's double trap
Gold	Jin Di; Xu Ying; Zhang Fan	Shooting	Men's skeet team
Gold	Guo Wenjun; Zhang Mengyuan; Zhou Qingyuan	Shooting	Women's 10 metre air pistol team
Gold	Zhang Mengyuan	Shooting	Women's 10 metre air pistol
Gold	Zhang Jingjing	Shooting	Women's 25 metre pistol
Gold	Wu Liuxi; Yi Siling; Zhang Binbin	Shooting	Women's 10 metre air rifle team
Gold	Chang Jing; Chen Dongqi; Zhao Huixin	Shooting	Women's 50 metre rifle three positions team
Gold	Li Xueyan	Shooting	Women's 10 metre running target
Gold	Li Xueyan; Su Li; Yang Zeng	Shooting	Women's 10 metre running target team
Gold	Zhu Jingyu	Shooting	Women's trap
Gold	Bai Yiting; Zhang Yafei; Zhu Mei	Shooting	Women's double trap team
Gold	Li Bowen (sport shooter); Lin Piaopiao; Zhang Heng	Shooting	Women's skeet team
Gold	Ning Zetao	Swimming	Men's 50 metre freestyle
Gold	Ning Zetao	Swimming	Men's 100 metre freestyle
Gold	Sun Yang	Swimming	Men's 400 metre freestyle
Gold	Sun Yang	Swimming	Men's 1500 metre freestyle
Gold	Shi Yang	Swimming	Men's 50 metre butterfly
Gold	Yu Hexin; Lin Yongqing; Sun Yang; Ning Zetao	Swimming	Men's 4 x 100 metre freestyle relay
Gold	Xu Jiayu; Li Xiang; Li Zhuhao; Ning Zetao	Swimming	Men's 4 x 100 metre medley relay
Gold	Chen Xinyi	Swimming	Women's 50 metre freestyle
Gold	Shen Duo	Swimming	Women's 100 metre freestyle
Gold	Shen Duo	Swimming	Women's 200 metre freestyle
Gold	Zhang Yuhan	Swimming	Women's 400 metre freestyle
Gold	Bi Yirong	Swimming	Women's 800 metre freestyle
Gold	Fu Yuanhui	Swimming	Women's 50 metre backstroke
Gold	Fu Yuanhui	Swimming	Women's 100 metre backstroke
Gold	Shi Jinglin	Swimming	Women's 100 metre breaststroke
Gold	Lu Ying	Swimming	Women's 50 metre butterfly
Gold	Chen Xinyi	Swimming	Women's 100 metre butterfly
Gold	Jiao Liuyang	Swimming	Women's 200 metre butterfly
Gold	Ye Shiwen	Swimming	Women's 200 metre individual medley
Gold	Ye Shiwen	Swimming	Women's 400 metre individual medley
Gold	Ye Shiwen; Shen Duo; Zhang Yufei; Tang Yi; Qiu Yuhan; Chen Xinyi; Sun Meichen; Zhou Yilin	Swimming	Women's 4 x 100 metre freestyle relay
Gold	Guo Junjun; Tang Yi; Cao Yue; Shen Duo	Swimming	Women's 4 x 200 metre freestyle relay
Gold	Huang Xuechen; Sun Wenyan; Sun Yijing	Synchronized swimming	Women's duet
Gold	Chen Xiaojun; Gu Xiao; Guo Li; Li Xiaolu; Liang Xinping; Sun Wenyan; Sun Yijing; Tang Mengni; Yu Lele; Zeng Zhen	Synchronized swimming	Women's team
Gold	Chen Xiaojun; Gu Xiao; Guo Li; Huang Xuechen; Li Xiaolu; Liang Xinping; Sun Wenyan; Sun Yijing; Tang Mengni; Yin Chengxin; Yu Lele; Zeng Zhen	Synchronized swimming	Women's combination
Gold	Xu Xin	Table tennis	Men's singles
Gold	Ma Long; Zhang Jike	Table tennis	Men's doubles
Gold	Fan Zhendong; Ma Long; Xu Xin; Zhang Jike; Zhou Yu	Table tennis	Men's team
Gold	Liu Shiwen	Table tennis	Women's singles
Gold	Zhu Yuling; Chen Meng	Table tennis	Women's doubles
Gold	Chen Meng; Ding Ning; Liu Shiwen; Wu Yang; Zhu Yuling	Table tennis	Women's team
Gold	Guo Yunfei	Taekwondo	Women's 67 kg
Gold	Li Donghua	Taekwondo	Women's +73 kg
Gold	Wang Qiang	Tennis	Women's Singles
Gold	Ma Yuanyuan; Xia Xinyi	Volleyball	Women
Gold	Yang Jun; Li Shujin; Liu Ping; Sun Yujun; Chen Huili; Sun Yating; Song Donglun; Zhang Cong; Zhao Zihan; Tian Jianing; Wang Xinyan; Lu Yiwen; Peng Lin	Water polo	Women
Gold	Lin Qingfeng	Weightlifting	Men's 56 kg
Gold	Lü Xiaojun	Weightlifting	Men's 77 kg
Gold	Tian Tao	Weightlifting	Men's 85 kg
Gold	Liu Hao	Weightlifting	Men's 94 kg
Gold	Yang Zhe	Weightlifting	Men's 105 kg
Gold	Xiang Yanmei	Weightlifting	Women's 69 kg
Gold	Zhou Lulu	Weightlifting	Women's +75 kg
Gold	Zhou Feng	Wrestling	Women's freestyle 75 kg
Gold	Zhao Fuxiang	Wushu	Men's sanda 56 kg
Gold	Kong Hongxing	Wushu	Men's sanda 60 kg
Gold	Zhang Kun	Wushu	Men's sanda 70 kg
Gold	Wang Di	Wushu	Men's nanquan
Gold	Chen Zhouli	Wushu	Men's taijiquan
Gold	Sun Peiyuan	Wushu	Men's daoshu and gunshu
Gold	Kan Wencong	Wushu	Women's changquan
Gold	Yu Mengmen	Wushu	Women's taijiquan
Gold	Zhang Luan	Wushu	Women's sanda 52 kg
Gold	Wang Cong	Wushu	Women's sanda 60 kg
Silver	Yong Zhiwei	Archery	Men's Individual
Silver	Cheng Ming; Xu Jing; Zhu Jueman	Archery	Women's Team
Silver	Su Bingtian	Athletics	Men's 100 m
Silver	Teng Haining	Athletics	Men's 800 m
Silver	Zhang Guowei	Athletics	Men's High jump
Silver	Dong Bin	Athletics	Men's Triple jump
Silver	Wang Shizhu	Athletics	Men's Hammer throw
Silver	Wei Yongli	Athletics	Women's 100 m
Silver	Sun Yawei	Athletics	Women's 100 m hurdles
Silver	Li Zhenzhu	Athletics	Women's 3000 metres steeplechase
Silver	Ding Changqin	Athletics	Women's 10000 m
Silver	Zheng Xingjuan	Athletics	Women's High jump
Silver	Wang Zheng	Athletics	Women's Hammer throw
Silver	Lu Xiaoxin	Athletics	Women's Discus throw
Silver	Li Lingwei	Athletics	Women's Javelin throw
Silver	Chen Long	Badminton	Men's Singles
Silver	Chen Long; Xu Chen; Zhang Nan; Lin Dan; Cai Yun; Fu Haifeng; Gao Huan; Liu Xiaolong; Qiu Zihan; Tian Houwei	Badminton	Men's team
Silver	Li Xuerui	Badminton	Women's Singles
Silver	Liu Dan; Jin Weina; Yu Dong; Shi Xiufeng; Sun Xiaoyu; Shen Binbin; Ma Xueya; Ding Yuan; Zhang Fan; Yang Banban; Yang Hengyu; Jin Jiabao	Basketball	Women
Silver	Du Jianchao	Bowling	Men's singles
Silver	Zhang Jiawei	Boxing	Men's 52 kg
Silver	Li Qian	Boxing	Women's 75 kg
Silver	Zheng Pengfei; Wang Riwei	Canoeing	Men's C2 1000 m
Silver	Zhuang ShuibinLi Guiqiang; Wu Xiaojun; Zhao Rong	Canoeing	Men's K4 1000 m
Silver	Zhou Yu	Canoeing	Women's K1 200 m
Silver	Ren Wenjun; Ma Qing	Canoeing	Women's K2 500 m
Silver	Li Wenjuan	Cycling	Women's Time trial
Silver	Xu Chao; Hu Ke; Bao Saifei	Cycling	Men's team sprint
Silver	Zhong Tianshi	Cycling	Women's sprint
Silver	Luo Xiaoling	Cycling	Women's Omnium
Silver	Yang Ling	Cycling	Women's cross-country
Silver	Lu Yan	Cycling	Women's BMX race
Silver	He Chong	Diving	Men's 1 m springboard
Silver	He Chao	Diving	Men's 3 m springboard
Silver	Yang Jian	Diving	Men's 10 m platform
Silver	Wang Han	Diving	Women's 1 m springboard
Silver	Wang Han	Diving	Women's 3 m springboard
Silver	Huang Xiaohui	Diving	Women's 10 m platform
Silver	Lei Sheng; Ma Jianfei; Li Chen; Chen Haiwei	Fencing	Men's team foil
Silver	Le Huilin	Fencing	Women's individual foil
Silver	Chen Bingbing; Wang Chen	Fencing	Women's team foil
Silver	Shen Chen; Qian Jiarui; Li Fei; Yu Xinting	Fencing	Women's team sabre
Silver	Hua Tian	Equestrian	Individual eventing
Silver	Liang Meiyu; Xu Xiaoxu; ZHAO Yudiao; Huang Ting; Wu Mengrong; Li Hongxia; De Jiaojiao; ZHANG Xiaoxue; Song Qingling; Sun Xiao; Wang Mengyu; Li Dongxiao; Wang Na; Cui Qiuxia; Xi Xiayun; Peng Yang	Field hockey	Women
Silver	Huang Yuguo	Gymnastics	Men's floor
Silver	Shang Chunsong	Gymnastics	Women's individual
Silver	Huang Huidan	Gymnastics	Women's uneven bars
Silver	Shang Chunsong	Gymnastics	Women's floor
Silver	Deng Senyue	Gymnastics	Women's rhythmic
Silver	Tu Xiao	Gymnastics	Men's trampoline
Silver	Zhong Xingping	Gymnastics	Women's trampoline
Silver	Yang Junxia	Judo	Women's 63 kg
Silver	Tang Lingling	Karate	Women's kumite 68 kg
Silver	Zeng Cuilan	Karate	Women's kumite +68 kg
Silver	Sun Jiali	Sailing	Women's RS:X
Silver	Yu Huijia	Sailing	Women's Optimist
Silver	Pang Wei	Shooting	Men's 10 metre air pistol team
Silver	Pang Wei; Pu Qifeng; Wang Zhiwei	Shooting	Men's 10 metre air pistol
Silver	Jin Yongde	Shooting	Men's 25 metre center fire pistol
Silver	Zhang Jian	Shooting	Men's 25 metre rapid fire pistol
Silver	Hu Haozhe; Li Yuehong; Zhang Jian	Shooting	Men's 25 metre rapid fire pistol team
Silver	Cao Yifei	Shooting	Men's 10 metre air rifle
Silver	Zhu Qinan	Shooting	Men's 50 metre rifle three positions
Silver	Zhai Yujia	Shooting	Men's 10 metre running target mixed
Silver	Hu Binyuan; Li Jun; Mo Junjie	Shooting	Men's double trap team
Silver	Xu Ying	Shooting	Men's skeet
Silver	Chen Ying	Shooting	Women's 25 metre pistol
Silver	Chen Ying; Zhang Jingjing; Zhou Qingyuan	Shooting	Women's 25 metre pistol team
Silver	Chang Jing; Chen Dongqi; Yi Siling	Shooting	Women's 50 metre rifle prone team
Silver	Su Li	Shooting	Women's 10 metre running target
Silver	Chen Fang; Zhu Jingyu; Zhu Mei	Shooting	Women's trap team
Silver	Zhang Yafei	Shooting	Women's double trap
Silver	Zhang Heng	Shooting	Women's skeet
Silver	Chen Hui	Soft tennis	Women's singles
Silver	Zhou Mo; Chen Hui	Soft tennis	Mixed doubles
Silver	Sun Yang	Swimming	Men's 200 metre freestyle
Silver	Xu Jiayu	Swimming	Men's 100 metre backstroke
Silver	Xu Jiayu	Swimming	Men's 200 metre backstroke
Silver	Li Zhuhao	Swimming	Men's 100 metre butterfly
Silver	Yang Zhixian	Swimming	Men's 400 metre individual medley
Silver	Li Yunqi; Lin Yongqing; Mao Feilian; Xu Qiheng	Swimming	Men's 4 x 200 metre freestyle relay
Silver	Tang Yi	Swimming	Women's 100 metre freestyle
Silver	Bi Yirong	Swimming	Women's 400 metre freestyle
Silver	Xu Danlu	Swimming	Women's 800 metre freestyle
Silver	Chen Jie	Swimming	Women's 200 metre backstroke
Silver	Suo Ran	Swimming	Women's 50 metre breaststroke
Silver	Lu Ying	Swimming	Women's 100 metre butterfly
Silver	Fan Zhendong	Table tennis	Men's singles
Silver	Xu Xin; Fan Zhendong	Table tennis	Men's doubles
Silver	Zhu Yuling	Table tennis	Women's singles
Silver	Liu Shiwen; Wu Yang	Table tennis	Women's doubles
Silver	Huang Jiannan	Taekwondo	Men's 68 kg
Silver	Chen Linglong	Taekwondo	Men's 87 kg
Silver	Li Zhaoyi	Taekwondo	Women's 49 kg
Silver	Zhang Hua	Taekwondo	Women's 62 kg
Silver	Gong Maoxin; Li Zhe; Wu Di; Zhang Ze	Tennis	Men's team
Silver	Duan Yingying; Zhang Shuai; Zheng Jie; Zheng Saisai	Tennis	Women's Team
Silver	Zhong Weijun; Ding Xia; HUANG Liuyan; Li Jing; Liu Yanhan; Qiao Ting; Wang Qi; Wang Qian; Yan Ni; Yao Di; Yin Na; Zhang Changning; Zhanf Xiaoya	Volleyball	Women
Silver	Chen Cheng; Li Jian	Volleyball	Men
Silver	Chen Lijun	Weightlifting	Men's 62 kg
Silver	Ai Yunan	Weightlifting	Men's +105 kg
Silver	Wang Shuai	Weightlifting	Women's 58 kg
Silver	Deng Wei	Weightlifting	Women's 63 kg
Silver	Kang Yue	Weightlifting	Women's 75 kg
Silver	Xiao Di	Wrestling	Men's Greco-Roman 98 kg
Silver	Sun Yanan	Wrestling	Women's freestyle 48 kg
Silver	Xiluo Zhuoma	Wrestling	Women's freestyle 63 kg
Silver	Wei Hong	Wushu	Women's nanquan
Bronze	Xu Jing	Archery	Women's Individual
Bronze	Cheng Wen	Athletics	Men's 400 m hurdles
Bronze	Wang Zhendong	Athletics	Men's 50 kilometres walk
Bronze	Gao Xinglong	Athletics	Men's Long jump
Bronze	Wan Yong	Athletics	Men's Hammer throw
Bronze	Zhao Jing	Athletics	Women's 800 m
Bronze	Wei Yongli	Athletics	Women's 400 m hurdles
Bronze	Ding Changqin	Athletics	Women's 5000 m
Bronze	Li Manyuan; Wang Huan; Chen Jingwen; Cheng Chong	Athletics	Women's 4 × 400 m relay
Bronze	Jiang Yanfei	Athletics	Women's Long jump
Bronze	Guo Tianqian	Athletics	Women's Shot put
Bronze	Tan Jian	Athletics	Women's Discus throw
Bronze	Tian Qing; Zhao Yunlei	Badminton	Women's Doubles
Bronze	Xu Chen; Ma Jin	Badminton	Mixed doubles
Bronze	Wang Xiaodong	Canoeing	Men's slalom C1
Bronze	Yuan Tao	Canoeing	Men's slalom K1
Bronze	Wang Longkui	Canoeing	Men's C1 1000 m
Bronze	Zong Meng; Chu Youyong	Canoeing	Men's K2 200 m
Bronze	Li Zhenyu; Sun Xinchang	Canoeing	Men's K2 1000 m
Bronze	Bao Saifei	Cycling	Men's sprint
Bronze	Lin Junhong	Cycling	Women's sprint
Bronze	Zhong Tianshi	Cycling	Women's keirin
Bronze	Yan Zhu	Cycling	Men's BMX race
Bronze	Peng Na	Cycling	Women's BMX race
Bronze	Chen Haiwei	Fencing	Men's individual foil
Bronze	Sun Wei	Fencing	Men's individual sabre
Bronze	Sun Wei; Xu Yingming; Fang Xin; Tan Sheng	Fencing	Men's team sabre
Bronze	Li Fei	Fencing	Fencing at the 2014 Asian Games -
Bronze	Shen Chen	Fencing	Fencing at the 2014 Asian Games – Women's individual sabre
Bronze	Wang Xinying; Ye Ziqi; Shi Yuting	Golf	Team
Bronze	Huang Xi; Huang Yuguo; Liao Junlin; Wang Peng; Yang Shengchao; Zou Kai	Gymnastics	Men's artistic team
Bronze	Huang Xi	Gymnastics	Men's vault
Bronze	Shang Chunsong	Gymnastics	Women's balance beam
Bronze	Chen Fei	Judo	Women's 70 kg
Bronze	Zhang Zhehui	Judo	Women's 78 kg
Bronze	Ma Yingnan; Wu Shugen; Zhou Ying; Yang Junxia; Chen Fei; Ma Sisi; Zhang Zhehui	Judo	Women's team
Bronze	Sun Jingchao	Karate	Men's kumite 55 kg
Bronze	Yin Xiaoyan	Karate	Women's kumite 61 kg
Bronze	Bian Yufei; Chen Qian; Liang Wanxia; Wang Wei	Modern pentathlon	Women's team
Bronze	Dong Tianfeng; Kong Deming	Rowing	Men's lightweight double sculls
Bronze	Shi Chuankun	Sailing	Men's Mistral
Bronze	Lan Hao; Wang Chao	Sailing	Men's 470
Bronze	Lao Tianxue; Zhang Yanan; Liu Xiaofang; Song Cheng; Cui Yonghui	Sepaktakraw	Women's regu
Bronze	Hu Haozhe	Shooting	Men's 25 metre rapid fire pistol
Bronze	Wang Zhiwei	Shooting	Men's 50 metre pistol
Bronze	Jin Di	Shooting	Men's skeet
Bronze	Zhang Binbin	Shooting	Women's 10 metre air rifle
Bronze	Chang Jing	Shooting	Women's 50 metre rifle three positions
Bronze	Bai Yiting	Shooting	Women's double trap
Bronze	Zhou Mo	Soft tennis	Men's singles
Bronze	Li Ze; Lin Chengwei; Shi Xiaolin; Zhang Yusheng; Zhou Mo	Soft tennis	Men's team
Bronze	Zhong Yi	Soft tennis	Women's singles
Bronze	Chen Hui; Feng Zixuan; Liu Ge; Xin Yani; Zhong Yi	Soft tennis	Women's team
Bronze	Li Yunqi	Swimming	Men's 200 metre freestyle
Bronze	Hao Yun	Swimming	Men's 400 metre freestyle
Bronze	Wang Kecheng	Swimming	Men's 1500 metre freestyle
Bronze	Xu Jiayu	Swimming	Men's 50 metre backstroke
Bronze	Li Xiang	Swimming	Men's 100 metre breaststroke
Bronze	Wang Shun	Swimming	Men's 200 metre individual medley
Bronze	Tang Yi	Swimming	Women's 50 metre freestyle
Bronze	Tang Yi	Swimming	Women's 200 metre freestyle
Bronze	Wang Xueer	Swimming	Women's 100 metre backstroke
Bronze	He Yuzhe	Swimming	Women's 50 metre breaststroke
Bronze	He Yun	Swimming	Women's 100 metre breaststroke
Bronze	Shi Jinglin	Swimming	Women's 200 metre breaststroke
Bronze	Liu Lan	Swimming	Women's 50 metre butterfly
Bronze	Qiao Sen	Taekwondo	Men's 80 kg
Bronze	Wu Jingyu	Taekwondo	Women's 53 kg
Bronze	Wang Yun	Taekwondo	Women's 57 kg
Bronze	Zhang Ze; Zheng Jie	Tennis	Mixed Doubles
Bronze	Faquan Bai	Triathlon	Men's individual
Bronze	Lianyuan Wang	Triathlon	Women's individual
Bronze	Lingxi Xin; Zhengyu Duan; Yuting Huamng; Faquan Bai	Triathlon	Mixed team relay
Bronze	Bao Jian; Ha Likejiang	Volleyball	Men
Bronze	Wang Fan; Yue Yuan	Volleyball	Women
Bronze	WU Honghui; Tan Feihu; Liang Zhongxing; Yu Lijun; Guo Junliang; Pan Ning; Li Bin; Wang Yang; Dong Tao; Chen Jinghao; Zhang Chufeng; Liang Nianxiang; Liang Zhiwei	Water polo	Men
Bronze	Wu Jingbiao	Weightlifting	Men's 56 kg
Bronze	Zhang Wanqiong	Weightlifting	Women's 53 kg
Bronze	Yeerlanbieke Katai	Wrestling	Men's freestyle 65 kg
Bronze	Tian Qiye	Wrestling	Men's Greco-Roman 59 kg
Bronze	Peng Fei	Wrestling	Men's Greco-Roman 85 kg
Bronze	Meng Qiang	Wrestling	Men's Greco-Roman 130 kg
Bronze	Zhong Xuechun	Wrestling	Women's freestyle 55 kg
Bronze	Chen Hongxing	Wushu	Men's sanda 65 kg

== Archery ==
Men's recurve

Athlete	Event	Ranking Round		Round of 64	Round of 32	Round of 16	Quarterfinals	Semifinals	Final/BM	Rank
Athlete	Event	Score	Seed	Opposition Score	Opposition Score	Opposition Score	Opposition Score	Opposition Score	Opposition Score	Rank
Gu Xuesong	Individual	1318	10	Bye	Duangsuwan (THA); W 6 – 2	Gantögs (MGL); W 5 – 5	Yong ZW (CHN); L 2 – 6	did not advance		
Li Jialun	Individual	1261	38	did not advance						
Qi Kaiyao	Individual	1316	12	did not advance						
Yong Zhiwei	Individual	1296	26	Bye	Gankin (KAZ); W 6 – 2	Lee S-y (KOR); W 5 – 5	Gu XS (CHN); W 6 – 2	Kikuchi (JPN); W 7 – 3	Gold medal match Oh J-h (KOR); L 4 – 6	2nd place, silver medalist(s)
Gu Xuesong; Qi Kaiyao; Yong Zhiwei	Team	3928	5	—N/a		Thailand (THA); W 6 – 0	Chinese Taipei (TPE); W 6 – 2	South Korea (KOR); W 5 – 4	Gold medal match Malaysia (MAS); W 6 – 0	1st place, gold medalist(s)

Women's recurve

Athlete	Event	Ranking Round		Round of 32	Round of 16	Quarterfinals	Semifinals	Final/BM	Rank
Athlete	Event	Score	Seed	Opposition Score	Opposition Score	Opposition Score	Opposition Score	Opposition Score	Rank
Cheng Ming	Individual	1348	5	Tamang (NEP); W 6 – 0	Marma (BAN); W 6 – 2	Ren Hayakawa (KGZ); L 2 – 6	did not advance		
Xu Jing	Individual	1352	4	Magar (NEP); W 6 – 0	Tukebayeva (KAZ); W 6 – 4	Choirunisa (INA); W 6 – 4	Chang H-j (KOR); L 2 – 6	Bronze medal match Hayakawa (JPN); W 7 – 3	3rd place, bronze medalist(s)
Zhang Dan	Individual	1324	14	did not advance					
Zhu Jueman	Individual	1344	6	did not advance					
Cheng Ming; Xu Jing; Zhu Jueman	Team	4044	2	—N/a	Bye	North Korea (PRK); W 5 – 1	Japan (JPN); W 6 – 0	Gold medal match South Korea (KOR); L 6 – 0	2nd place, silver medalist(s)

== Athletics ==
Men's

Athlete	Event	Round 1			Semifinal			Final	
Athlete	Event	Heat	Time	Rank	Heat	Time	Rank	Time	Rank
Su Bingtian	100 m	2	10.35	2 Q	1	10.22	2 Q	10.10	2nd place, silver medalist(s)
Zhang Peimeng	100 m	1	10.27	2 Q	2	10.17	3 Q	10.18	4
Zhang Peimeng	200 m	3	20.77	1 Q	2	22.74	7	did not advance	
Xie Zhenye	200 m	3	20.77	1 Q	2	Disqualified		did not advance	
Zhu Chenbin	400 m	2	46.50 Q	3 Q	1	46.58	5	did not advance	
Zhang Huadong	400 m	4	47.16	3 Q	2	46.99	5	did not advance	
Teng Haining	800 m	3	1:48.82	2 Q				1:47.81	2nd place, silver medalist(s)
Xie Wenjun	110 m hurdles	2	13.53	2 Q				13.36	1st place, gold medalist(s)
Jiang Fan	110 m hurdles	1	13.53	1 Q				13.68	5
Cheng Wen	400 m hurdles	3	49.89	1 Q				50.29	3rd place, bronze medalist(s)
Chen Ke	400 m hurdles	1	51.77	5				did not advance	
Wang Yashuan	3000 m steeplechase							8:59.64	6
Duo Bujie	5000 m							14:13.74	12
Wang Zhen	20 kilometres walk							1:19:45 GR	1st place, gold medalist(s)
Cai Zelin	20 kilometres walk							1:22:56	4
Wang Zhendong	50 kilometres walk							3:50:52	3rd place, bronze medalist(s)
Zhang Lin	50 kilometres walk							4:08:05	6
Su Guoxiong	Marathon							2:20:11	8
Mo Youxue; Xie Zhenye; Su Bingtian; Zhang Peimeng; Yang Yang; Chen Shiwei	4 × 100 m relay	1	39.07	2 Q				37.99 AR, GR	1st place, gold medalist(s)
Zhu Chenbin; Ou Shaowei; Chen Ke; Cheng Wen	4 × 400 m relay	1	3:09.19	2 Q				3:06.51	5

Athlete	Event	Final	
Athlete	Event	Result	Rank
Zhang Guowei	High jump	2.33	2nd place, silver medalist(s)
Wang Yu	High jump	2.25	4
Xue Changrui	Pole vault	5.55	1st place, gold medalist(s)
Yang Yansheng	Pole vault	5.45	4
Li Jinzhe	Long jump	8.01	1st place, gold medalist(s)
Gao Xinglong	Long jump	7.86	3rd place, bronze medalist(s)
Cao Shuo	Triple jump	17.30	1st place, gold medalist(s)
Dong Bin	Triple jump	16.95	2nd place, silver medalist(s)
Wang Guangfu	Shot put	18.51	7
Wu Jian	Discus throw	58.82	5
Wu Tao	Discus throw	56.67	8
Wang Shizhu	Hammer throw	73.65	2nd place, silver medalist(s)
Wan Yong	Hammer throw	73.43	3rd place, bronze medalist(s)
Zhao Qinggang	Javelin throw	89.15 AR, GR	1st place, gold medalist(s)
Song Bin	Javelin throw	76.49	6

Athlete	Event	100m	LJ	SP	HJ	400 m	110m H	DT	PV	JV	1500m	Total	Rank
Guo Qi	Decathlon	11.14; 830	6.97; 897	13.34; 688	1.96; 767	50.05; 812	14.37; 927	36.79; 600	4.80; 849	48.26; 563	4:43.59; 658	7501	6

Women

Athlete	Event	Round 1			Final	
Athlete	Event	Heat	Time	Rank	Time	Rank
Yuan Qiqi	100 m	2	11.55	2 Q	11.68	6
Wei Yongli	100 m	1	11.53	2 Q	11.48	1st place, gold medalist(s)
Wei Yongli	200 m	2	23.55	2 Q	23.27	2nd place, silver medalist(s)
Lin Huijun	200 m	3	23.35	1 Q	23.53	4
Chen Jingwen	400 m	1	54.93	4	did not advance	
Zhao Jing	800 m	2	2:02.98	2 Q	1:59.48	3rd place, bronze medalist(s)
Wang Mei	800 m	1	2:04.49	3 Q	2:05.80	6
Liu Fang	1500 m				4:19.98	6
Zhang Meixia	1500 m				4:32.36	12
Wu Shuijiao	100 m hurdles	1	13.00	1 Q	12.72	1st place, gold medalist(s)
Sun Yawei	100 m hurdles	2	13.26	1 Q	13.05	2nd place, silver medalist(s)
Xiao Xia	400 m hurdles	2	58.13	1 Q	56.59	3rd place, bronze medalist(s)
Cai Minjia	400 m hurdles	1	59.22	3 Q	57.12	5
Li Zhenzhu	3000 metres steeplechase				9:35.23	2nd place, silver medalist(s)
Ding Changqin	5000 m				15:12.51	3rd place, bronze medalist(s)
Xiao Huimin	5000 m				16:04.60	11
Ding Changqin	10000 m				31:53.09	2nd place, silver medalist(s)
Jia Chaofeng	10000 m				32:21.74	5
Lu Xiuzhi	20 kilometres walk				1:31:06	1st place, gold medalist(s)
Nie Jingjing	20 kilometres walk				1:34:54	4
Yue Chao	Marathon				2:33:20	5
He Yinli	Marathon				2:33:46	6
Tao Yujia; Kong Lingwei; Lin Huijun; Wei Yongli	4 × 100 m relay				42.83 GR	1st place, gold medalist(s)
Li Manyuan; Wang Huan; Chen Jingwen; Cheng Chong	4 × 400 m relay				3:32.02	3rd place, bronze medalist(s)

Athlete	Event	Final	
Athlete	Event	Result	Rank
Zheng Xingjuan	High jump	1.92	2nd place, silver medalist(s)
Zhang Luyu	High jump	1.85	6
Li Ling	Pole vault	4.35 GR	1st place, gold medalist(s)
Xu Huiqin	Pole vault	4.05	4
Jiang Yanfei	Long jump	6.34	3rd place, bronze medalist(s)
Lu Minjia	Long jump	6.28	6
Li Yanmei	Triple jump	13.71	4
Deng Lina	Triple jump	13.71	5
Gong Lijiao	Shot put	19.06	1st place, gold medalist(s)
Guo Tianqian	Shot put	17.52	3rd place, bronze medalist(s)
Wu Jian	Discus throw	58.82	5
Lu Xiaoxin	Discus throw	59.35	2nd place, silver medalist(s)
Tan Jian	Discus throw	59.03	3rd place, bronze medalist(s)
Zhang Wenxiu	Hammer throw	77.33 GR	1st place, gold medalist(s)
Wang Zheng	Hammer throw	74.16	2nd place, silver medalist(s)
Zhang Li	Javelin throw	65.47 GR	1st place, gold medalist(s)
Li Lingwei	Javelin throw	61.43	2nd place, silver medalist(s)

Athlete	Event	100m H	HJ	SP	200m	LJ	JT	800m	Total	Rank
Wang Qingling	Heptathlon	13.68; 1023	1.77; 941	11.85; 651	24.19; 963	6.13; 890	37.12; 612	2:23.61; 775	5856	2nd place, silver medalist(s)

== Badminton ==
Men

Athlete	Event	Round of 32	Round of 16	Quarter Final	Semi Final	Final	Rank
Athlete	Event	Opposition Result	Opposition Result	Opposition Result	Opposition Result	Opposition Result	Rank
Lin Dan	Singles	Lee Dong-keun (KOR); W 2-0; 21-12 28-26	Hu Yun (HKG); W 21-16 22-20	Kenichi Tago (JPN); W 2-0; 21-14 22-18	Lee Chong Wei (MAS); W 2-1; 20-22 21-12 21-9	Chen Long (CHN); W 2-1; 12-21 21-16 21-16	1st place, gold medalist(s)
Chen Long	Singles	Chong Wei Feng (MAS); W 2-0; 21-7 21-13	Kento Momota (JPN); W 2-0; 21-19 21-6	Shon Wan-ho (KOR); W 2-0; 21-16 21-19	Wei Nan (HKG); W 2-0; 21-6 21-10	Lin Dan (CHN); L 1-2; 21-12 16-21 16-21	2nd place, silver medalist(s)

Athlete	Event	Round of 32	Round of 16	Quarter Final	Semi Final	Final	Rank
Athlete	Event	Opposition Result	Opposition Result	Opposition Result	Opposition Result	Opposition Result	Rank
Cai Yun; Fu Haifeng	Doubles	Chopra (IND); Dewalkar (IND); W 2-0; 21-10 21-15	Pratama (INA); Saputro (INA); L 1-2; 21-13 19-21 20-22	Did Not Advance			
Liu Xiaolong; Qiu Zihan	Doubles	Hoon Thien How (MAS); Tan Boon Heong (MAS); W WO	Attri (IND); Buss (IND); L 0-2; 17-21 16-21	Did Not Advance			

Men's team

Athlete	Round of 16	Quarterfinals	Semifinals	Final	Rank
Athlete	Opposition Result	Opposition Result	Opposition Result	Opposition Result	Rank
Chen Long; Xu Chen; Zhang Nan; Lin Dan; Cai Yun; Fu Haifeng; Gao Huan; Liu Xiaolong; Qiu Zihan; Tian Houwei	Bye	(Malaysia); Malaysia; W 3-0	(Hong Kong); Hong Kong; W 3-0	(South Korea); South Korea; L 2-3	2nd place, silver medalist(s)

Women

Athlete	Event	Round of 32	Round of 16	Quarter Final	Semi Final	Final	Rank
Athlete	Event	Opposition Result	Opposition Result	Opposition Result	Opposition Result	Opposition Result	Rank
Li Xuerui	Singles	Bye	Yip Pui Yin (HKG); W 2-0; 21-13 21-15	Manuputty (INA); W 2-0; 21-9 21-19	Tai Tzu-ying (TPE); W 2-1; 21-16 24-26 21-8	Wang Yihan (CHN); L 1-2; 21-11 17-21 7-21	2nd place, silver medalist(s)
Wang Yihan	Singles	Fanetri (INA); W 2-0; 21-16 21-16	Pai Hsiao-ma (TPE); W 2-0; 21-17 21-16	Nehwal (IND); W 2-1; 18-21 21-9 21-7	Bae Youn-joo (KOR); W 2-1; 10-21 21-12 21-16	Li Xuerui (CHN); W 2-1; 11-21 21-17 21-7	1st place, gold medalist(s)

Athlete	Event	Round of 16	Quarter Final	Semi Final	Final	Rank
Athlete	Event	Opposition Result	Opposition Result	Opposition Result	Opposition Result	Rank
Yu Yang; Wang Xiaoli	Doubles	Hoo Kah Mun (MAS); Wei (MAS); L 1-2; 21-17 11-21 20-22	Did Not Advance			
Tian Qing; Zhao Yunlei	Doubles	Teng Lok (NEP); Ieng (NEP); W 2-0; 21-7 21-10	Kim Ha-na (KOR); Jung Kyung-eun (KOR); W 2-1; 21-13 19-21 21-19	Polii (INA); Maheswari (INA); L 1-2; 17-21 21-19 17-21	Did Not Advance	3rd place, bronze medalist(s)

Women's team

Athlete	Round of 16	Quarterfinals	Semifinals	Final	Rank
Athlete	Opposition Result	Opposition Result	Opposition Result	Opposition Result	Rank
Li Xuerui; Tian Qing; Zhao Yunlei; Wang Shixian; Yu Yang; Wang Xiaoli; Wang Yihan; Liu Xin; Bao Yixin; Ma Jin	Bye	(Malaysia); Malaysia; W 3-0	(Japan); Japan; W 3-1	(South Korea); South Korea; W 3-0	1st place, gold medalist(s)

Mixed Doubles

Athlete	Event	Round of 32	Round of 16	Quarter Final	Semi Final	Final	Rank
Athlete	Event	Opposition Result	Opposition Result	Opposition Result	Opposition Result	Opposition Result	Rank
Zhang Nan; Zhao Yunlei	Mixed doubles	Bye	Kenichi Hayakawa (JPN); Misaki Matsutomo (JPN); W 2-0; 21-8 21-11	Chen Hung-ling (TPE); Cheng Wen-hsing (TPE); W 2-0; 21-17 21-15	Jordan (INA); Susanto (INA); W 2-0; 21-19 21-17	Tontowi (INA); Natsir (INA); W 2-0; 21-16 21-14	1st place, gold medalist(s)
Xu Chen; Ma Jin	Mixed doubles	Bye	Liao Min-Chun (TPE); Chen Hsiao-Huan (TPE); W 2-0; 21-14 21-17	Chrisnanta (SIN); Neo Yu Yan (SIN); W 2-0; 21-12 21-15	Tontowi (INA); Natsir (INA); L 0-2; 12-21 10-21	Did Not Advance	3rd place, bronze medalist(s)

== Baseball ==
Men

Squad list	Preliminary round		Semifinal	Final	Rank
Squad list	Group A	Rank	Semifinal	Final	Rank
Chen Hao; Cui Xiao; Dong Wei; Du Xiaolei; Li Shuai; Li Xin; Li Ziliang; Liu Yu; Lu Yi; Luo Xia; Meng Qingyuan; Meng Weiqiang; Na Chuang; Qi Jiping; Ran Song; Sun Jianzeng; Tang Wei; Wang Kai; Wang Wei; Yang Haifan; Yang Shunyi; Zhai Yuankai; Zhang Haoyue; Zhang Xiang	Japan; L 0-11	2 Q	South Korea; L 2-7	Bronze Medal; Japan; L 0-10	4
Chen Hao; Cui Xiao; Dong Wei; Du Xiaolei; Li Shuai; Li Xin; Li Ziliang; Liu Yu; Lu Yi; Luo Xia; Meng Qingyuan; Meng Weiqiang; Na Chuang; Qi Jiping; Ran Song; Sun Jianzeng; Tang Wei; Wang Kai; Wang Wei; Yang Haifan; Yang Shunyi; Zhai Yuankai; Zhang Haoyue; Zhang Xiang	Mongolia; W 15–0	2 Q	South Korea; L 2-7	Bronze Medal; Japan; L 0-10	4
Chen Hao; Cui Xiao; Dong Wei; Du Xiaolei; Li Shuai; Li Xin; Li Ziliang; Liu Yu; Lu Yi; Luo Xia; Meng Qingyuan; Meng Weiqiang; Na Chuang; Qi Jiping; Ran Song; Sun Jianzeng; Tang Wei; Wang Kai; Wang Wei; Yang Haifan; Yang Shunyi; Zhai Yuankai; Zhang Haoyue; Zhang Xiang	Pakistan; W 6-0	2 Q	South Korea; L 2-7	Bronze Medal; Japan; L 0-10	4

== Basketball ==
Men

Squad list	Preliminary round		Playoff 1–8		Semifinal	Final	Rank
Squad list	Group C	Rank	Group G	Rank	Semifinal	Final	Rank
Liu Xiaoyu; Guo Ailun; Gu Quan; Zhou Qi; Zhao Tailong; Zhai Xiaochuan; Ding Yanyuhang; Zhou Peng; Xirelijiang Mugedaer; Sun Tonglin; Li Xiaoxu; Wang Zhelin	Kazakhstan; W 76–59	1 Q	Mongolia; W 108–67	3	5-8th place match Philippines; W 87–71	5th place match Qatar; L 60-70	6
Liu Xiaoyu; Guo Ailun; Gu Quan; Zhou Qi; Zhao Tailong; Zhai Xiaochuan; Ding Yanyuhang; Zhou Peng; Xirelijiang Mugedaer; Sun Tonglin; Li Xiaoxu; Wang Zhelin	Chinese Taipei; W 59–58	1 Q	Japan; L 72-79	3	5-8th place match Philippines; W 87–71	5th place match Qatar; L 60-70	6
Liu Xiaoyu; Guo Ailun; Gu Quan; Zhou Qi; Zhao Tailong; Zhai Xiaochuan; Ding Yanyuhang; Zhou Peng; Xirelijiang Mugedaer; Sun Tonglin; Li Xiaoxu; Wang Zhelin		1 Q	Iran; L 67-75	3	5-8th place match Philippines; W 87–71	5th place match Qatar; L 60-70	6

Women

Squad list	Quarterfinal	Semifinal	Final	Rank
Liu Dan; Jin Weina; Yu Dong; Shi Xiufeng; Sun Xiaoyu; Shen Binbin; Ma Xueya; Ding Yuan; Zhang Fan; Yang Banban; Yang Hengyu; Jin Jiabao	Kazakhstan; W 57–43	Chinese Taipei; W 75–63	South Korea; L 64-70	2nd place, silver medalist(s)

== Boxing ==
Men

Athlete	Event	Round of 32	Round of 16	Quarterfinal	Semifinal	Final	Rank
Lü Bin	49 kg	Dusmatov (UZB); L 0-3	Did not advance				17
Yong Chang	52 kg	Zoirov (UZB); L 0-3	Did not advance				17
Zhang Jiawei	52 kg	Akhmadaliev (KAZ); W 3-0	Fujita (JPN); W 3-0	Malabekov (KGZ); W 2-1	Fernandez (PHI); W 3-0	Sang-myeong (KOR); L 0-3	2nd place, silver medalist(s)
WANG Lei	60 kg	Bye	Kei (MAC); W RSC	Shimizu (JPN); L 0-3	Did not advance		5
Li Quanlong	64 kg	Bye	Hyunchul (KOR); L 0-3	Did not advance			9
Liu Wei	69 kg	Bye	Mandeep (IND); L 1-2	Did not advance			9
Zhou Di	75 kg	Bye	Fidaa (QAT); W 3-0	Alhindawi (JOR); L 0 - 3	Did not advance		5
Zhang Aolin	81 kg		Alfadhlirr (KUW); W RSC	Niyazymbetov (KAZ); L 0 - 3	Did not advance		5
Wang Xuanxuan	91 kg		Tulaganov (UZB); L 0-3	Did not advance			9
Gu Guangming	+91 kg		Delavari (IRI); L 0-3	Did not advance			9

Women

Athlete	Event	Round of 16	Quarterfinal	Semifinal	Final	Rank
Si Haijuan	51 kg	Satumrum (THA); W 2-1	Mary Kom (IND); L 0-3	Did not advance		5
Yin Junhua	60 kg	Thongjan (THA); W 3-0	Petecio (PHI); W 3-0	Duyên (VIE); W 3-3	Ji-na (PHI); W 3-0	1st place, gold medalist(s)
Li Qian	75kg	Bye	Weerarathna (SRI); W 3-0	Rani (IND); W 2-0	Un-hu (PRK); L KO	2nd place, silver medalist(s)

== Canoeing ==
=== Slalom ===
Men

Athlete	Event	Heats		Repechage		Last 16		Quarterfinal	Semifinal	Final	Rank
Athlete	Event	Time	Rank	Time	Rank	Time	Rank	Quarterfinal	Semifinal	Final	Rank
Wang Xiaodong	C1	1:09.88	1 Q			1:10.49	2 Q	Taniguchi (JPN); W 1:11.69-1:18.77	Haneda (JPN); L 1:11.42-1:11.65	3rd place match Khavantsev (KAZ); W 1:14.00-1:20.03	3rd place, bronze medalist(s)
Chen Fangjia	C1	1:10.81	2 Q			1:11.07	4 Q	Kulikov (KAZ); L 1:12.67-1:18.68	did not advance		5
Yuan Tao	K1	1:03.05	2 Q			1:02.56	1 Q	Hung (TPE); W 1:04.92-1:06.82	Hung (TPE); L 1:05.14-1:05.14	3rd place match Hermann (THA); W 1:04.82-1:07.92	3rd place, bronze medalist(s)
Tan Ya	K1	1:03.83	3 Q			1:03.06	2 Q	Yoshida (KAZ); L 1:05.68-1:08.20	did not advance		5

Women

Athlete	Event	Heats		Repechage		Last 16		Quarterfinal	Semifinal	Final	Rank
Athlete	Event	Time	Rank	Time	Rank	Time	Rank	Quarterfinal	Semifinal	Final	Rank
Cen Nanqin	C1	1:20.20	1 Q					Wei (TPE); W 1:21.62–1:28.79	Sonia Gomari (IRI); W 1:23.55–1:28.24	Wei (TPE); W 1:23.79–1:34.31	1st place, gold medalist(s)
Chen Shi	C1	1:22.75	2 Q					Min (KOR); L 1:31.08–1:32.75	did not advance		5
Li	K1	1:07.92	1 Q					Seyed (IRI); L 1:10.77–1:16.32	did not advance		5
Li Tong	K1	1:07.94	1 Q					Onnom (THA); W 1:09.02-1:25.24	Yazawa (JPN); W 1:09.21-1:15.30	Chu (TPE); W 1:09.42-1:12.56	1st place, gold medalist(s)

=== Sprint ===
Men

Athlete	Event	Heat			Semifinal		Final		Rank
Athlete	Event	Heat	Time	Rank	Time	Rank	Time	Rank	Rank
Li Qiang	C1 200 m	2	38.466	1 QF			39.270	1	1st place, gold medalist(s)
Wang Longkui	C1 1000 m	2	4:16.284	1 QF			4:03.890	3	3rd place, bronze medalist(s)
Zheng Pengfei; Wang Riwei	C2 1000 m	2	3:48.068	2 QF			3:46.250	2	2nd place, silver medalist(s)
Zhang Hongpeng	K1 200 m	12	36.311	5 QS	37.611	1 Q	37.155	5	5
Bi Pengfei	K1 1000 m	2	36.311	2QF			3:49.652	4	4
Zong Meng; Chu Youyong	K2 200 m	2	32.382	4 QS	33.787	2 Q	33.201	3	3rd place, bronze medalist(s)
Li Zhenyu; Sun Xinchang	K2 1000 m	1	3:27.706	2 QF			3:25.050	3	3rd place, bronze medalist(s)
Zhuang Shuibin; Li Guiqiang; Wu Xiaojun; Zhao Rong	K4 1000 m	2	2:59.758	3 QF			3:01.374	24	2nd place, silver medalist(s)

Women

Athlete	Event	Heat			Semifinal		Final		Rank
Athlete	Event	Heat	Time	Rank	Time	Rank	Time	Rank	Rank
Zhou Yu	K1 200 m	2	41.103	1 QF			40.851	2	2nd place, silver medalist(s)
Zhou Yu	K1 500 m	1	1:56.349	1 QF			1:51.334	1	1st place, gold medalist(s)
Ren Wenjun; Ma Qing	K2 500 m	1	1:41.486	1 Q			1:42.807	2	2nd place, silver medalist(s)
Ren Wenjun; Ma Qing; Jieyi Huang; Liu Haiping	K4 500 m	2	41.103	1 QF			1:34.477	1	1st place, gold medalist(s)

== Cricket ==
Men

Squad list	Preliminary round		Quarterfinals	Semifinal	Final	Rank
Squad list	Group A	Rank	Quarterfinals	Semifinal	Final	Rank
Hu Gaofeng; Gaosheng Zhao (wk); Haiyang Tian (wk); Jian Li; Jing Wang; Lei Sun; Minjian Han; Peng Qing; Zhang Peng; Shuyao Jiang; Zhong Wenyi; Song Yangyang; Yongsheng Ge; Zhang Yufei; Yusong Yang	Malaysia; L 56/7 (20.0)- 58/1(9.0)	3	Did not advance			
Hu Gaofeng; Gaosheng Zhao (wk); Haiyang Tian (wk); Jian Li; Jing Wang; Lei Sun; Minjian Han; Peng Qing; Zhang Peng; Shuyao Jiang; Zhong Wenyi; Song Yangyang; Yongsheng Ge; Zhang Yufei; Yusong Yang	South Korea; L 82/7(10.0)-88/5(10.0)	3	Did not advance			

Women

Squad list	Preliminary round		Quarterfinals	Semifinal	Final	Rank
Squad list	Group C	Rank	Quarterfinals	Semifinal	Final	Rank
Huang Zhuo (c); Zhou Caiyun; Wu Di; Song Fengfeng; Zhou Haijie; Wu Juan; Han Lili; Zhang Mei; Wang Meng; Yu Miao; Zhou Miao; Zhao Ning; Ruan Xiang; Liu Xiaonan; Lyu Zhongyuan	South Korea; W 50/2(15.0) - 49(13.2)	1 Q	Japan; W 72/3(18.4) -71/7(20.0)	Pakistan; L37 (19.0)-41/1(8.0)	Bronze Medal; Sri Lanka; L 65/6(20.0)- 66/5(17.1)	4
Huang Zhuo (c); Zhou Caiyun; Wu Di; Song Fengfeng; Zhou Haijie; Wu Juan; Han Lili; Zhang Mei; Wang Meng; Yu Miao; Zhou Miao; Zhao Ning; Ruan Xiang; Liu Xiaonan; Lyu Zhongyuan	Hong Kong; W 83/9(20.0)-79/5(20.0)	1 Q	Japan; W 72/3(18.4) -71/7(20.0)	Pakistan; L37 (19.0)-41/1(8.0)	Bronze Medal; Sri Lanka; L 65/6(20.0)- 66/5(17.1)	4

== Cycling ==
=== Road ===
Men
Athlete	Event	Time	Rank
Zhao Jingbiao	Road race	4:08:51	5
Liu Jianpeng	Road race	-	DNF
Wang Meiyin	Time trial	36:23.67	11

Women
Athlete	Event	Time	Rank
Zhang Nan	Road race	3:39:33	7
Tang Kerong	Road race	3:39:33	9
Li Wenjuan	Time trial	38:46.26	2nd place, silver medalist(s)

=== Track ===
Sprints

Athlete	Event	Qualifying		1/8 Finals (Repechage)	Quarterfinals	Semifinals	Finals/ Classification races	
Athlete	Event	Time Speed	Rank	Opposition Time	Opposition Time	Opposition Time	Opposition Time	Rank
Bao Saifei	Men's sprint	10.128	5 Q	Mow (TPE); W 11.448	Yunos (MAS); W 10.546	Hassanali Varposhti (IRI); W 10.738,W 10.644	Nakagawa (JPN); L L Awang (MAS); L ,W 10.602,W10.677	3rd place, bronze medalist(s)
Xu Chao	Men's sprint	10.131	6 Q	Amrit (IND); W 10.908	Daneshvar (IRI); W 10.674	Kawabata (JPN); L, L	5th–8th places Im (KOR); Choi (KOR); Varposhti (IRI)	8
Xu Chao; Hu Ke; Bao Saifei	Men's team sprint	59.957	2 Q				South Korea; L	2nd place, silver medalist(s)
Zhong Tianshi	Women's sprint	10.780	1 Q		Lee (KOR); W 12.377, W 11.936	Mustapa (MAS); W 11.911, W 11.659	Lee (HKG); L ,L	2nd place, silver medalist(s)
Lin Junhong	Women's sprint	11.116	3 Q		Maeda (JPN); W 12.425, W 12.248	Lee (HKG); L, L	Mustapa (MAS); W 11.717, L, W 11.754	3rd place, bronze medalist(s)
Zhong Tianshi; Gong Jinjie	Women's team sprint	43.461	1 Q				South Korea; W43.774	1st place, gold medalist(s)

Pursuits

Athlete	Event	Qualifying		1st round		Finals	
Athlete	Event	Time	Rank	Opposition Time	Rank	Opposition Time	Rank
Zhao Baofang; Huang Dongyan; Jiang Wenwen; Jing Yali	Women's team pursuit	4:33.064	1 Q	Chinese Taipei; W 4:36.364	1 Q	South Korea; W 4:28.469	1st place, gold medalist(s)
Yuan Zhong; Shen Pingan; Qin Chenlu; Liu Hao	Men's team pursuit	4:10.458	1 Q	Japan; W 4:08.470	1 Q	South Korea; W 4:12.269	1st place, gold medalist(s)

Keirin

Athlete	Event	1st round	Repechage	2nd round	Finals
Athlete	Event	Rank	Rank	Rank	Rank
Bao Saifei	Men's keirin	3 R	2	2 QF	4
Xu Chao	Men's keirin	1 Q		5	8
Zhong Tianshi	Women's keirin	2			3rd place, bronze medalist(s)
Lin Junhong	Women's keirin	1			6

Omnium

Athlete	Event	Scratch Race	Ind. Pursuit	Elim. Race	Time Trail	Flying Lap	Cycling - Points Race	Total	Rank
Liu Hao	Men's Omnium	34	36	38	36	34	26	204	7
Luo Xiaoling	Women's Omnium	40	38	36	38	38	23	213	2nd place, silver medalist(s)

=== Mountain Bike ===
Men
Athlete	Event	Time	Rank
Wang Zhen	Cross-country	1:42:34	1st place, gold medalist(s)
Liu Xinyang	Cross-country	1:57:34	13

Women
Athlete	Event	Time	Rank
Shi Qinglan	Cross-country	1:17:06	1st place, gold medalist(s)
Yang Ling	Cross-country	1:23:02	2nd place, silver medalist(s)

=== BMX ===
Men
Athlete	Event	Qualifying				Final	
Athlete	Event	Run 1	Run 2	Run 3	Points	Time	Rank
Yan Zhu	BMX race	37.242	37.072	35.609	3 Q	36.668	3rd place, bronze medalist(s)
Zhao Zhiyang	BMX race	38.193	47.130	37.952	7 Q	36.749	5

Women
Athlete	Event	Qualifying				Final	
Athlete	Event	Run 1	Run 2	Run 3	Points	Time	Rank
Lu Yan	BMX race	37.764	38.239	38.700	2 Q	37.956	2nd place, silver medalist(s)
Peng Na	BMX race	39.869	38.935	38.334	3 Q	39.481	3rd place, bronze medalist(s)

== Diving ==
Men

Athlete	Event	Preliminaries		Final	
Athlete	Event	Points	Rank	Points	Rank
He Chao	1 m springboard	—N/a		462.85	1st place, gold medalist(s)
He Chong	1 m springboard	—N/a		443.10	2nd place, silver medalist(s)
Cao Yuan	3 m springboard	504.85	2 Q	523.65	1st place, gold medalist(s)
He Chao	3 m springboard	513.90	1 Q	503.80	2nd place, silver medalist(s)
Qiu Bo	10 m platform	548.75	2 Q	576.40	1st place, gold medalist(s)
Yang Jian	10 m platform	553.65	1 Q	526.95	2nd place, silver medalist(s)
Cao Yuan; Lin Yue	3 m synchronized springboard	—N/a		460.86	1st place, gold medalist(s)
Chen Aisen; Zhang Yanquan	10 m synchronized platform	—N/a		462.90	1st place, gold medalist(s)

Women

Athlete	Event	Preliminaries		Final	
Athlete	Event	Points	Rank	Points	Rank
Shi Tingmao	1 m springboard	—N/a		308.45	1st place, gold medalist(s)
Wang Han	1 m springboard	—N/a		287.40	2nd place, silver medalist(s)
He Zi	3 m springboard	—N/a		374.45	1st place, gold medalist(s)
Wang Han	3 m springboard	—N/a		359.30	2nd place, silver medalist(s)
Huang Xiaohui	10 m platform	—N/a		362.30	2nd place, silver medalist(s)
Si Yajie	10 m platform	—N/a		394.25	1st place, gold medalist(s)
Shi Tingmao; Wu Minxia	3 m synchronized springboard	—N/a		318.60	1st place, gold medalist(s)
Chen Ruolin; Liu Huixia	10 m synchronized platform	—N/a		346.50	1st place, gold medalist(s)

== Equestrian ==
Dressage

Athlete	Horse	Event	Prix St-Georges		Intermediate I		Intermediate I freestyle	
Athlete	Horse	Event	Score	Rank	Score	Rank	Total	Rank
Liu Tao	Razida	Individual	67.316	15	68.447	14	135.622	11
Lan Chao	Weltroon	Individual	67.053	17	65.316	22	did not advance	
Liu Lina	Don Dinero	Individual	66.526	18	66.184	17	did not advance	
Huang Zhuoqin	Uris	Individual	66.184	19	67.263	16	139.363	7
Liu Lina; Huang Zhuoqin; Liu Tao; Lan Chao	Don Dinero; Uris; Razida; Weltroon	Team	66.965	5th				

Eventing

Athlete	Horse	Event	Dressage	Cross-country		Jumping			Total	Rank	
Athlete	Horse	Event	Dressage	Jump	Time	Total	Jump	Time	Total	Rank	Total
Hua Tian	Temujin	Individual	38.10			0.00		3.00	3.00	41.10	2nd place, silver medalist(s)
Liang Ruiji	Vasthi	Individual	47.50			0.00			0.00	47.5	7
Li Jingmin	Zhendeyi	Individual	65.20		5.60	5.60	12	1.00	13.00	83.80	19
Lu Junhong	Watch Out	Individual	54.80			EL				EL	—
Liang Ruiji; Hua Tian; Li Jingmin; Lu Junhong	as above	Team	150.80			5.60			16.00	172.40	4

== Field hockey ==
Men

Squad list	Preliminary round		Semifinal	Final	Rank
Squad list	Group B	Rank	Semifinal	Final	Rank
Ao Weibao; Zhang Zhixuan; Sun Long; Yan Rongyao; Du Talake; Sun Zhixin; Guo Xiaoping; Huang Yue; Meng Lei; Du Chen; Sun Tianjun; E Liguang; Dong Yang; Wang Zipeng; Xu Rui; Ao Yang	Oman; W 5-0	3		5th place match Japan; L 1-1	6
Ao Weibao; Zhang Zhixuan; Sun Long; Yan Rongyao; Du Talake; Sun Zhixin; Guo Xiaoping; Huang Yue; Meng Lei; Du Chen; Sun Tianjun; E Liguang; Dong Yang; Wang Zipeng; Xu Rui; Ao Yang	Pakistan; L 0-2	3		5th place match Japan; L 1-1	6
Ao Weibao; Zhang Zhixuan; Sun Long; Yan Rongyao; Du Talake; Sun Zhixin; Guo Xiaoping; Huang Yue; Meng Lei; Du Chen; Sun Tianjun; E Liguang; Dong Yang; Wang Zipeng; Xu Rui; Ao Yang	Sri Lanka; W 6-0	3		5th place match Japan; L 1-1	6
Ao Weibao; Zhang Zhixuan; Sun Long; Yan Rongyao; Du Talake; Sun Zhixin; Guo Xiaoping; Huang Yue; Meng Lei; Du Chen; Sun Tianjun; E Liguang; Dong Yang; Wang Zipeng; Xu Rui; Ao Yang	India; L 0-2	3		5th place match Japan; L 1-1	6

Women

Squad list	Preliminary round		Semifinal	Final	Rank
Squad list	Group A	Rank	Semifinal	Final	Rank
Liang Meiyu; Xu Xiaoxu; ZHAO Yudiao; Huang Ting; Wu Mengrong; Li Hongxia; De Jiaojiao; ZHANG Xiaoxue; Song Qingling; Sun Xiao; Wang Mengyu; Li Dongxiao; Wang Na; Cui Qiuxia; Xi Xiayun; Peng Yang	Malaysia; W 1-0	1 Q	Japan; W 1-0	South Korea; L 0-1	2nd place, silver medalist(s)
Liang Meiyu; Xu Xiaoxu; ZHAO Yudiao; Huang Ting; Wu Mengrong; Li Hongxia; De Jiaojiao; ZHANG Xiaoxue; Song Qingling; Sun Xiao; Wang Mengyu; Li Dongxiao; Wang Na; Cui Qiuxia; Xi Xiayun; Peng Yang	India; W 2-1	1 Q	Japan; W 1-0	South Korea; L 0-1	2nd place, silver medalist(s)
Liang Meiyu; Xu Xiaoxu; ZHAO Yudiao; Huang Ting; Wu Mengrong; Li Hongxia; De Jiaojiao; ZHANG Xiaoxue; Song Qingling; Sun Xiao; Wang Mengyu; Li Dongxiao; Wang Na; Cui Qiuxia; Xi Xiayun; Peng Yang	Thailand; W 5-0	1 Q	Japan; W 1-0	South Korea; L 0-1	2nd place, silver medalist(s)

== Football ==
Men

Squad list	Preliminary round		Round of 16	Quarterfinals	Semifinal	Final	Rank
Squad list	Group F	Rank	Round of 16	Quarterfinals	Semifinal	Final	Rank
Fang Jingqi; Li Ang; Cao Haiqing; Yang Ting; Shi Ke (Captain); Han Pengfei; Sun Guowen; Wang Rui; Yang Chaosheng; Feng Gang; Tao Yuan; Xu Jiamin; Fu Huan; Chang Feiya; Liao Lisheng; Liao Junjian; Xie Pengfei; Zhang Wei; Guo Hao; Zhuang Jiajie	North Korea; L 0-3	2 Q	Thailand; L 0-2	Did not advance			
Fang Jingqi; Li Ang; Cao Haiqing; Yang Ting; Shi Ke (Captain); Han Pengfei; Sun Guowen; Wang Rui; Yang Chaosheng; Feng Gang; Tao Yuan; Xu Jiamin; Fu Huan; Chang Feiya; Liao Lisheng; Liao Junjian; Xie Pengfei; Zhang Wei; Guo Hao; Zhuang Jiajie	Pakistan; W 1-0	2 Q	Thailand; L 0-2	Did not advance			

Women

Pos	Team	Pld	W	D	L	GF	GA	GD	Pts
1	Japan	3	2	1	0	15	0	+15	7
2	China	3	2	1	0	9	0	+9	7
3	Chinese Taipei	3	0	1	2	2	9	−7	1
4	Jordan	3	0	1	2	2	19	−17	1

Source: RSSSF

Squad list	Preliminary round		Quarterfinals	Semifinal	Final	Rank
Squad list	Group F	Rank	Quarterfinals	Semifinal	Final	Rank
Wu Haiyan; Wang Shanshan; Zhang Rui; Wang Fei; Li Jiayue; Wang Lingling; Liu Shanshan; Ma Jun; Wang Chen; Han Peng; Wang Lisi; Ren Guixin; Li Ying; Xu Yanlu; Yang Li; Li Dongna; Gu Yasha; Zhang Yue	Japan; D 1-1	2 Q	North Korea; L 0-1	Did not advance		
Wu Haiyan; Wang Shanshan; Zhang Rui; Wang Fei; Li Jiayue; Wang Lingling; Liu Shanshan; Ma Jun; Wang Chen; Han Peng; Wang Lisi; Ren Guixin; Li Ying; Xu Yanlu; Yang Li; Li Dongna; Gu Yasha; Zhang Yue	Chinese Taipei} W 4-0	2 Q	North Korea; L 0-1	Did not advance		
Wu Haiyan; Wang Shanshan; Zhang Rui; Wang Fei; Li Jiayue; Wang Lingling; Liu Shanshan; Ma Jun; Wang Chen; Han Peng; Wang Lisi; Ren Guixin; Li Ying; Xu Yanlu; Yang Li; Li Dongna; Gu Yasha; Zhang Yue	Jordan; W 5-0	2 Q	North Korea; L 0-1	Did not advance		

== Golf ==
Men

Athlete	Event	Round 1	Round 2	Round 3	Round 4	Total	Par	Rank
Bai Zhengkai	Individual	75	66	68	68	277	-4	5
Dou Ze-cheng	Individual	70	70	72	69	281	-3	12
Guan Tianlang	Individual	68	72	71	70	282	-2	13
Zhang Jin	Individual	72	77	73	70	292	-2	35
Zhang Jin; Guan Tianlang; Dou Ze-cheng; Bai Zhengkai	Team	209	208	211	207	835	-29	4

Women

Athlete	Event	Round 1	Round 2	Round 3	Round 4	Total	Par	Rank
Shi Yuting	Individual	74	70	70	65	279	-7	4
Ye Ziqi	Individual	70	71	74	68	283	-4	10
Wang Xinying	Individual	71	73	75	73	292	+1	16
Wang Xinying; Ye Ziqi; Shi Yuting	Team	141	141	144	133	559	-11	3rd place, bronze medalist(s)

== Gymnastics ==
=== Artistic gymnastics ===
Men
Individual Qualification & Team all-around Final

Athlete	Apparatus						Individual All-around		Team	
Athlete	Floor	Pommel horse	Rings	Vault	Parallel bars	Horizontal bar	Total	Rank	Total	Rank
Zou Kai	15.350 Q					15.350 Q				
Huang Yuguo	14.950 Q	15.000 Q	14.400	14.650 Q	15.350 Q	12.800	87.300 Q	5		
Huaug Xi	14.750	13.700	14.425	14.950 Q	14.850	14.050	86.625 Q	6		
Wang Peng	14.700	12.900	14.350		14.150	13.625	84.075	9		
Yang Shengchao	14.450	13.950	14.600		15.050	14.600 Q	86.550	7		
Liao Junlin		13.500	14.950 Q		13.450					
Team Total	59.750	56.150	58.875	58.500	59.400	57.625			350.300	3rd place, bronze medalist(s)

Individual

Athlete	Event	Final							
Athlete	Event	Floor	Pommel Horse	Rings	Vault	Parallel Bars	Horizontal Bar	Total	Rank
Huang Yuguo	Individual all-around	14.850	13.700	14.600	14.450	15.450	13.450	86.500	4
Huang Yuguo	Floor	15.300						15.300	2nd place, silver medalist(s)
Huang Yuguo	Pommel Horse		14.033					14.033	7
Huang Yuguo	Vault				13.133			13.133	8
Huang Yuguo	Parallel Bar					13.900		13.900	8
Yang Shengchao	Individual all-around	13.650	13.100	14.650	13.350	14.375	14.800	83.925	5
Yang Shengchao	Horizontal Bar						14.733	14.733	5
Zou Kai	Floor	15.533						15.533	1st place, gold medalist(s)
Zou Kai	Horizontal Bar						15.800	15.800	1st place, gold medalist(s)
Huang Xi	Vault				14.800			14.800	3rd place, bronze medalist(s)
Liao Junlin	Rings			15.566				15.566	1st place, gold medalist(s)

Women
Individual Qualification & Team all-around Final

Athlete	Apparatus				Individual All-around		Team	
Athlete	Vault	Uneven bars	Balance beam	Floor	Total	Rank	Total	Rank
Tan Jiaxin		15.150		11.950				
Chen Siyi	14.775	14.650	13.550	13.775	56.750	3		
Yao Jinnan	14.450	15.650 Q	14.250	13.800 Q	58.150 Q	1		
Shang Chunsong	13.800	14.150	14.900 Q	13.950 Q	56.800 Q	2		
Bai Yawen			14.350 Q	11.700				
Huang Huidan		15.450 Q	13.450					
Team Total	57.875	60.900	57.050	53.475			229.300	1st place, gold medalist(s)

Individual

Athlete	Event	Final					
Athlete	Event	Vault	Uneven bars	Balance beam	Floor	Total	Rank
Yao Jinnan	Individual all-around	14.550	15.450	14.250	13.650	57.900	1st place, gold medalist(s)
Yao Jinnan	Uneven Bars		15.466			15.466	1st place, gold medalist(s)
Yao Jinnan	Floor				13.966	13.966	1st place, gold medalist(s)
Shang Chunsong	Individual all-around	13.650	15.350	14.900	13.050	56.950	2nd place, silver medalist(s)
Shang Chunsong	Balance beam			14.300		14.300	3rd place, bronze medalist(s)
Shang Chunsong	Floor				13.800	13.800	2nd place, silver medalist(s)
Huang Huidan	Uneven Bars		14.375			14.375	2nd place, silver medalist(s)
Bai Yawen	Balance Beam			13.366		13.366	7

=== Rhythmic gymnastics ===
Individual Qualification & Team all-around Final

Athlete	Apparatus				Individual All-around		Team	
Athlete	Rope	Hoop	Ball	Ribbon	Total	Rank		
Deng Senyue	17.633	17.550	17.700	17.300	52.883 Q	2		
Liu Jiahui	14.633	14.55	14.316	14.350	43.533 Q	10		
Team Total	32.266	46.733	32.283	46.416			157.698	5

Individual all-around

Athlete	Final					
Athlete	Rope	Hoop	Clubs	Ribbon	Total	Rank
Deng Senyue	17.583	17.400	17.866	17.483	70.332	2nd place, silver medalist(s)
Liu Jiahui	15.583	15.166	15.266	15.850	61.865	10

=== Trampoline ===
Men
Athlete	Event	Qualification		Final	
Athlete	Event	Score	Rank	Score	Rank
Dong Dong	Individual	111.150	1 Q	62.480	1st place, gold medalist(s)
Tu Xiao	Individual	110.275	2 Q	60.435	2nd place, silver medalist(s)

Women
Athlete	Event	Qualification		Final	
Athlete	Event	Score	Rank	Score	Rank
Li Dan	Individual	103.715	1 Q	57.000	1st place, gold medalist(s)
Zhong Xingping	Individual	102.195	2 Q	54.830	2nd place, silver medalist(s)

== Handball ==
Men

Squad list	Preliminary round		Playoff 1–8		Semifinal	Bronze Medal	Rank
Squad list	Pool C	Rank	Group	Rank	Semifinal	Bronze Medal	Rank
Cong Lin; Jiang Weiyi; Li An; Li Hexin; Li Yuqing; Pan Xiang; Song Pengqiang; Wang Quan; Wang Wei; Wang Xudong; Wu Longrui; Yang Fan; Yu Yanjiang; Zhao Chen; Zhao Xin; Zhou Xiaojian	Hong Kong ' 25'–22	3	Did not advance				9
Cong Lin; Jiang Weiyi; Li An; Li Hexin; Li Yuqing; Pan Xiang; Song Pengqiang; Wang Quan; Wang Wei; Wang Xudong; Wu Longrui; Yang Fan; Yu Yanjiang; Zhao Chen; Zhao Xin; Zhou Xiaojian	Kuwait; L 25-32	3	Did not advance				9
Cong Lin; Jiang Weiyi; Li An; Li Hexin; Li Yuqing; Pan Xiang; Song Pengqiang; Wang Quan; Wang Wei; Wang Xudong; Wu Longrui; Yang Fan; Yu Yanjiang; Zhao Chen; Zhao Xin; Zhou Xiaojian	Saudi Arabia; L 16-35	3	Did not advance				9

Women

Squad list	Preliminary round		Semifinal	Bronze Medal	Rank
Squad list	Pool A	Rank	Semifinal	Bronze Medal	Rank
Chen Qian; Gong Yan; Hou Yibo; Huang Hong; Li Xiaoqing; Li Yao; Qiaq Ru; Sha Zhengwen; Shen Ping; Wang Bin; Wu Nana; Wu Yin; Xu Mo; Yang Jiao; Zhang Haixia; Zaho Jiaqin	India; W 39-12	2 Q	Japan; L 25-28	Kazakhstan; L 26-28	4
Chen Qian; Gong Yan; Hou Yibo; Huang Hong; Li Xiaoqing; Li Yao; Qiaq Ru; Sha Zhengwen; Shen Ping; Wang Bin; Wu Nana; Wu Yin; Xu Mo; Yang Jiao; Zhang Haixia; Zaho Jiaqin	South Korea; L 22-35	2 Q	Japan; L 25-28	Kazakhstan; L 26-28	4
Chen Qian; Gong Yan; Hou Yibo; Huang Hong; Li Xiaoqing; Li Yao; Qiaq Ru; Sha Zhengwen; Shen Ping; Wang Bin; Wu Nana; Wu Yin; Xu Mo; Yang Jiao; Zhang Haixia; Zaho Jiaqin	Thailand; W 38-21	2 Q	Japan; L 25-28	Kazakhstan; L 26-28	4

== Judo ==
Men

Athlete	Event	Elimination round of 32	Elimination round of 16	Quarterfinal	Semifinal	Final	Rank
He Yunlong	60 kg	Khousrof (YEM); W 000–000	Ziade (LIB); L 001–101	Did not advance			9
Ma Duanbin	66 kg	Bye	Chui Yiu Leung (HKG); W 100–000	Mukanov (KAZ); L 010–013	Did not advance		5
Liu Wei	73 kg	Bye	Chi (HKG); W 100–000	Jurakobilov (UZB); L 000–100	Did not advance		5
Eri Hemubatu	81 kg	Kocharat (THA); W 100–000	Elias (LIB); L 000-101	Did not advance			9
Cheng Xunzhao	90 kg	Bye	Yang (SIN); W 100–000	Ustopiriyon (TJK); L 000–001	Repechage; Jamali (IRI); L 001-100	Did not advance	7
Xu Jie	100 kg	Sayidov (UZB); L 000-100	Did not advance				17
Liu Jian	+100 kg		Sahatov (TKM); W 100–000	Ojitani (JPN); L 000–101	Repechage; Abdurakhmonov (TJK); L 000-100	Did not advance	7
Liu Jian; Xu Jie; Cheng Xunzhao; Eri Hemubatu; Liu Wei; Ma Duanbin; He Yunlong	Team		Iran; L 2-3	Did not advance			9

Women

Athlete	Event	Elimination round of 16	Quarterfinal	Semifinal	Final	Rank
Wu Shugen	48 kg	Wan-chu (YEM); W 000–000	Baikuleva (KAZ); L 000–001	Repechage; Devi (IND); W 100–001	3rd place match kyeong (KOR); L 000–000	5
Ma Yingnan	52 kg	Bye	Devi (IND); W 010–000	Nakamura (JPN); L 000–100	3rd place match jung (KOR); L 000–000	5
Zhou Ying	57 kg	Momunova (KGZ); W 010–000	Jan-di (KOR); L 000–100	Repechage; Hyo-sun (PRK); L 000–001	Did not advance	7
Yang Junxia	63 kg	Bye	Urdabayeva (KAZ); W 001–000	Abe (JPN); W 001-000	Da-woon (KOR); L 000–001	2nd place, silver medalist(s)
Chen Fei	70 kg	Jong-sun (PRK); W 000–000	Arai (JPN); L 000–000	Repechage; Matniyazova (UZB); W 000-000	Did not advance	3rd place, bronze medalist(s)
Zhang Zhehui	78 kg		Amangeldiyeva (KAZ); W 000-000	Kyong (PRK); L 000–100	3rd place match Szu-chu (TPE); W 000-000	3rd place, bronze medalist(s)
Ma Sisi	+78 kg	Bye	Sarbashova (KGZ); W 111–000	Javzmaa (MGL); W 110-000	Repechage; Inamori (JPN); W 001-000	1st place, gold medalist(s)
Ma Sisi; Zhang Zhehui; Chen Fei; Yang Junxia; Zhou Ying; Ma Yingnan; Wu Shugen	Team		Japan; L 1-4	Chinese Taipei; W 5-0	Mongolia; W 3-2	3rd place, bronze medalist(s)

== Karate ==
Men's kumite

Athlete	Event	1/16 final	1/8 final	Quarterfinal	Semifinal	Final	Rank
Sun Jingchao	55 kg	Bye	Shalwan (QAT); W 7–0	Franco (PHI); W 2–0	Aktauov (KAZ); L 0-7	3rd place match Sanif (BRU); W 8–0	3rd place, bronze medalist(s)
Wang Zhiwei	60 kg	Bye	Osman (BAN); W 8 -0^{KK}	Mehdizadeh (IRI); L 4-11	repechage Davlatov (TJK); W 7–2	3rd place match Ji-hwan (KOR); L 3-11	4
Cui Wenju	84 kg		Araga (JPN); L 0-3	Repechage; Min-soo (KOR); L 4-4	did not advance		11
Peng Hui	+84 kg		Ganjzadeh (IRI); L 1-7	did not advance			9

Women's kumite

Athlete	Event	1/16 final	1/8 final	Quarterfinal	Semifinal	Final	Rank
Ma Zhining	50 kg	Bye	Reham (JOR); W 4–0	Tsui (TPE); L 2-3	repechage young (KOR); L 0–1	Did not advance	7
Yin Xiaoyan	61 kg		Mesheinesh (PLE); W 7–6	Shheber (SYR); W 5-0	Salni (MAS); L 0-2	3rd place match Hân (VIE); W 7–5	3rd place, bronze medalist(s)
Tang Lingling	68 kg		Nour (JOR); W 7–0	Magar (NEP); W 8-0	Jou (TPE); W 2-2	Gafurova (KAZ); L 3–4	2nd place, silver medalist(s)
Zeng Cuilan	+68 kg			Badalova (UZB); W 7–0	Uekusa (JPN); W 4–3	Abbasali (IRI); L 1-3	2nd place, silver medalist(s)

== Modern pentathlon ==
Men

Athlete	Event	Fencing (épée one touch)			Swimming (200 m freestyle)			Riding (show jumping)			Combined: shooting/running (10 m air pistol/3000 m)			Total points	Final rank
Athlete	Event	Results	Rank	MP points	Time	Rank	MP points	Time	Rank	MP points	Time	Rank	MP Points	Total points	Final rank
Guo Jianli	Men's	29V - 13D	1	250	2:03.20	7	331	1:00.42	9	286	23:40.60	6	584	1451	1st place, gold medalist(s)
Han Jiahao	Men's	25V - 17D	4	230	1:59.14	1	343	1:06.13	8	290	24:13.20	18	551	1414	4
Su Haihang	Men's	25V - 17D	4	230	2:02.06	5	334	1:14.13	14	261	24:02.16	11	562	1387	10
Zhang Linbin	Men's	17V - 25D	18	190	2:08.09	14	316	1:01.93	4	293	24:04.08	13	560	1359	13
Guo Jianli; Han Jiahao; Su Haihang; Zhang Linbin	Men's team	900			1324			1130			2257			5611	1st place, gold medalist(s)

Women

Athlete	Event	Fencing (épée one touch)			Swimming (200 m freestyle)			Riding (show jumping)			Combined: shooting/running (10 m air pistol/3000 m)			Total points	Final rank
Athlete	Event	Results	Rank	MP points	Time	Rank	MP points	Time	Rank	MP points	Time	Rank	MP Points	Total points	Final rank
Chen Qian	Women's	32V - 8D	1	270	2:17.85	5	287	1:07.11	9	275	25:55.84	4	516	1348	1st place, gold medalist(s)
Bian Yufei	Women's	22V - 18D	11	220	2:14.69	2	296	1:11.20	4	292	26:41.49	10	471	1279	4
Wang Wei	Women's	25V - 15D	6	235	2:20.46	11	279	did not finish			26:02.06	5	510	1024	14
Liang Wanxia	Women's	31V - 9D	2	265	2:18.25	8	286	did not finish			25:51.90	3	520	1071	12
Chen Qian; Bian Yufei; Wang Wei; Liang Wanxia	Women's team	990			1148			567			2017			4722	3rd place, bronze medalist(s)

== Rowing ==
Men

Athlete	Event	Heat			Repechage			Final	
Athlete	Event	Heat	Time	Rank	Heat	Time	Rank	Time	Rank
Zhang Liang; Dai Jun	Double sculls	1	6:26.04	1QA				6:24.69	1st place, gold medalist(s)
Ma Jian; Liu Zhiyu; Liu Dang; Zhang Quan	Quadruple sculls	1	6:00.95e	1QA				6:29.57	1st place, gold medalist(s)
Cheng Xunman; Yang Dongdong; MZhao Longjie; Feng Jiahui; Ni Xulin; Liu Hang; Yang Zengxin; Li Dongjian; Zhang Shetian	Eight	1	5:46.01	1QA				5:46.70	1st place, gold medalist(s)
Dong Tianfeng; Kong Deming	Lightweight double sculls	2	6:37.88	1QA				7:10.70	3rd place, bronze medalist(s)
Yu Chenggang; Li Hui; Fan Junjie; Wang Tiexin	Lightweight quadruple sculls	1	6:07.18	1QA				6:01.15	1st place, gold medalist(s)

Open

Athlete	Event	Heat			Repechage			Final	
Athlete	Event	Heat	Time	Rank	Heat	Time	Rank	Time	Rank
Lyu Yang; Duan Jingli	Double sculls	1	7:21.42	1 QA				7:33.23	1st place, gold medalist(s)
Wang Min; Shen Xiaoxing; Wang Yuwei; Zhang Xinyue	Quadruple sculls	1	6:49.05	1 QA				6:40.55	1st place, gold medalist(s)
Zhang Min; Miao Tian	Lightweight Coxless pair	1	7:28.79	1 QA				7:30.63	1st place, gold medalist(s)
Zhang Huan; Chen Le	Lightweight double sculls	1	7:23.78	1 QA				7:18.95	1st place, gold medalist(s)
Guo Shuai; Pan Dandan; Chen Cuiming; Huang Wenyi	Lightweight quadruple sculls	1	6:45.06	1QA				7:25.09	1st place, gold medalist(s)

== Rugby sevens ==
Men

Squad list	Preliminary round		Quarterfinal	5th-8th Place	5th Place	Rank
Squad list	Pool B	Rank	Quarterfinal	5th-8th Place	5th Place	Rank
Liu Chao; Li Yang; Chen Yongqiang; Lu Peng; Liu Huachuan; Chen Kaiwen; Zhang Chao; Liu Guanjun; Feng Wenru; Jiang Liwei; Wang Jianhua; Ma Chong	Philippines; W 19–14	2 Q	Sri Lanka; L 19-24	Chinese Taipei; W 22-7	Philippines; L 21-28	6
Liu Chao; Li Yang; Chen Yongqiang; Lu Peng; Liu Huachuan; Chen Kaiwen; Zhang Chao; Liu Guanjun; Feng Wenru; Jiang Liwei; Wang Jianhua; Ma Chong	Pakistan; W 48-0	2 Q	Sri Lanka; L 19-24	Chinese Taipei; W 22-7	Philippines; L 21-28	6
Liu Chao; Li Yang; Chen Yongqiang; Lu Peng; Liu Huachuan; Chen Kaiwen; Zhang Chao; Liu Guanjun; Feng Wenru; Jiang Liwei; Wang Jianhua; Ma Chong	Hong Kong; L 5-19	2 Q	Sri Lanka; L 19-24	Chinese Taipei; W 22-7	Philippines; L 21-28	6

Women

Squad list	Preliminary round		Semifinal	Gold Medal	Rank
Squad list	Pool A	Rank	Semifinal	Gold Medal	Rank
Guan Qishi; Liu Yang; Yu Xiaoming; Sun Tingting; Lu Yuanyuan; Sun Shichao; Zhou Lilian; Yang Hong; Yang Min; Chen Keyi; Jiang Qianqian; Yu Liping	Uzbekistan; W 29–0	1 Q	Kazakhstan; W 24-12	Japan; W 14-12	1st place, gold medalist(s)
Guan Qishi; Liu Yang; Yu Xiaoming; Sun Tingting; Lu Yuanyuan; Sun Shichao; Zhou Lilian; Yang Hong; Yang Min; Chen Keyi; Jiang Qianqian; Yu Liping	South Korea; W 64–0	1 Q	Kazakhstan; W 24-12	Japan; W 14-12	1st place, gold medalist(s)
Guan Qishi; Liu Yang; Yu Xiaoming; Sun Tingting; Lu Yuanyuan; Sun Shichao; Zhou Lilian; Yang Hong; Yang Min; Chen Keyi; Jiang Qianqian; Yu Liping	Singapore; W 43–0	1 Q	Kazakhstan; W 24-12	Japan; W 14-12	1st place, gold medalist(s)
Guan Qishi; Liu Yang; Yu Xiaoming; Sun Tingting; Lu Yuanyuan; Sun Shichao; Zhou Lilian; Yang Hong; Yang Min; Chen Keyi; Jiang Qianqian; Yu Liping	Japan; W 28–7	1 Q	Kazakhstan; W 24-12	Japan; W 14-12	1st place, gold medalist(s)

== Sailing ==
Men

Athlete	Event	Race												Total Points	Net Points	Final Rank
Athlete	Event	1	2	3	4	5	6	7	8	9	10	11	12	Total Points	Net Points	Final Rank
Lan Jingcheng; Zhou Weijie	420	8	7	6	6	6	3	7	5	7	6	6	3	70	62	6
Shi Jian	Laser	5	5	5	3	13	4	4	13	5	6	2	2	67	54	4
Lan Hao; Wang Chao	470	4	2	1	5	5	3	1	5	4	1	5	4	40	35	3rd place, bronze medalist(s)
Shi Chuankun	Mistral	6	3	5	4	4	4	2	2	1	4	3	4	42	36	3rd place, bronze medalist(s)
Wang Aichen	RS:X	2	1	1	2	1	2	1	3	1	2	4	1	21	17	1st place, gold medalist(s)
Wang Jie	Optimist	4	5	5	4	3	11	3	4	3	6	2	1	51	40	5

Women

Athlete	Event	Race												Total Points	Net Points	Final Rank
Athlete	Event	1	2	3	4	5	6	7	8	9	10	11	12	Total Points	Net Points	Final Rank
Jiang Xinyu; Shen Xinyu	420	4	3	5	6	6	5	4	5	6	5	6	4	59	53	5
Weng Qiaoshan	RS:One	3	3	1	1	1	3	1	1	2	2	2	3	23	20	1st place, gold medalist(s)
Sun Jiali; Wang Chao	RS:X	2	2	2	2	3	2	2	2	2	2	2	2	25	22	2nd place, silver medalist(s)
Zhang Dongshuang	Laser Radial	2	2	1	1	5	2	2	1	1	3	1	1	22	17	1st place, gold medalist(s)
Yu Huijia	Optimist	3	1	3	4	1	7	5	1	2	1	3	2	33	26	2nd place, silver medalist(s)

Open

Athlete	Event	Race								Point	Rank	Semifinals	Final	Rank
Athlete	Event	1	2	3	4	5	6	7	8	Point	Rank	Semifinals	Final	Rank
Xu Xiaomei; Gao Haiyan; Huang Lizhu; Liu Wuwei; Lv Dongwu	Match racing	Singapore; 0-2	South Korea; 0-2	Japan; 0-2	Malaysia; 0-2	Hong Kong; 2-0	Bahrain; 0-2	India; 1-1	Chinese Taipei; 2-0	5	7			

== Shooting ==
Men
Rifle

Athlete	Event	Qualification		Final	
Athlete	Event	Points	Rank	Points	Rank
Pang Wei	10 m air pistol	585-26x	3 Q	199.3	2nd place, silver medalist(s)
Pu Qifeng	10 m air pistol	583-25x	5 Q	77.2	8
Wang Zhiwei	10 m air pistol	575-14x	21	did not advance	
Pang Wei; Pu Qifeng; Wang Zhiwei	10 m air pistol team	—N/a		1743-65x	2nd place, silver medalist(s)
Pang Wei	50 m pistol	567-14x	3 Q	165.6	3rd place, bronze medalist(s)
Pu Qifeng	50 m pistol	564-19x	4 Q	128.8	5
Wang Zhiwei	50 m pistol	561-9x	5 Q	72.1	8
Pang Wei; Pu Qifeng; Wang Zhiwei	50 m pistol team	—N/a		1692-42x GR	1st place, gold medalist(s)
Ding Feng	25 m center fire pistol	—N/a		578-17x	14
Jin Yongde	25 m center fire pistol	—N/a		577-15x	1st place, gold medalist(s)
Li Chuanlin	25 m center fire pistol	—N/a		579-18x	13
Ding Feng; Jin Yongde; Li Chuanlin	25 m center fire pistol team	—N/a		1742-56x	1st place, gold medalist(s)
Hu Haozhe	25 m rapid fire pistol	579-20x	6 Q	25	3rd place, bronze medalist(s)
Li Yuehong	25 m rapid fire pistol	586-33x GR	1 Q	22	4
Zhang Jian	25 m rapid fire pistol	581-14x	5 Q	30	2nd place, silver medalist(s)
Hu Haozhe; Li Yuehong; Zhang Jian	25 m rapid fire pistol team	—N/a		1746-67x	2nd place, silver medalist(s)
Ding Feng	25 m standard pistol	—N/a		577-15x	1st place, gold medalist(s)
Jin Yongde	25 m standard pistol	—N/a		570-18x	4
Li Chuanlin	25 m standard pistol	—N/a		563-11x	10
Ding Feng; Jin Yongde; Li Chuanlin	25 m standard pistol team	—N/a		1710-44x	2nd place, silver medalist(s)
Cao Yifei	10 m air rifle	630.7-54x GR	1 Q	208.9	2nd place, silver medalist(s)
Liu Tianyou	10 m air rifle	626.5-50x	3 Q	143.8	5
Yang Haoran	10 m air rifle	629.2-54x	2 Q	209.6	1st place, gold medalist(s)
Cao Yifei; Yang Haoran; Liu Tianyou	10 m air rifle team	—N/a		1886.4-158x GR	1st place, gold medalist(s)
Lan Xing	50 m rifle prone	625.6-45x	2 Q	101.9	7
Liu Gang	50 m rifle prone	624.2-41x	6 Q	79.1	8
Zhao Shengbo	50 m rifle prone	626.2-44x GR	1 Q	209.1 AS, GR	1st place, gold medalist(s)
Lan Xing; Liu Gang; Zhao Shengbo	50 m rifle prone team	—N/a		1876.0-130x WR, AS, GR	1st place, gold medalist(s)
Cao Yifei	50 m air rifle three positions	1166-61x	4 Q	455.5	1st place, gold medalist(s)
Kang Hongwei	50 m air rifle three positions	1165-56x	6 Q	430.3	4
Zhu Qinan	50 m air rifle three positions	1171-62x	1 Q	455.2	2nd place, silver medalist(s)
Cao Yifei; Kang Hongwei; Zhu Qinan	50 m air rifle three positions team	—N/a		3502-179x GR	1st place, gold medalist(s)

Shotgun

Athlete	Event	Qualification		Semifinal		Final	
Athlete	Event	Points	Rank	Points	Rank	Points	Rank
Gan Yu	10 m running target	568-15x	8	did not advance			
Zhai Yujia	10 m running target	579-17x	2 Q	Ibrayev (KAZ); W 7-5	Yongchol (PRK); W 6-4	1st place, gold medalist(s)	
Zhang Jie	10 m running target	570-14x	5	did not advance			
Gan Yu; Zhai Yujia; Zhang Jie	10 m running target team	—N/a				1139-32x	1st place, gold medalist(s)
Xie Durun	10 m running target mixed	—N/a				378-7x	7
Zhai Yujia	10 m running target mixed	—N/a				383-15x	2nd place, silver medalist(s)
Zhang Jie	10 m running target mixed	—N/a				378-10x	4
Xie Durun; Zhai Yujia; Zhang Jie	10 m running target mixed team	—N/a				1139-32x	1st place, gold medalist(s)
Du Yu	Trap	119	4 Q	10	5	did not advance	
Gao Bo	Trap	120	2 Q	13	2 QG	Aldefhani (KUW); W 15-12	1st place, gold medalist(s)
Zhang Yiyao	Trap	118	7	did not advance			
Du Yu; Gao Bo; Zhang Yiyao	Trap team	—N/a				357	1st place, gold medalist(s)
Hu Binyuan	Double trap	138	4 Q	30	1 QG	Aldefhani (KUW); W 26-25	1st place, gold medalist(s)
Li Jun	Double trap	132	12	did not advance			
Mo Junjie	Double trap	134	9	did not advance			
Hu Binyuan; Li Jun; Mo Junjie	Double trap team	—N/a				404 AS, GR	2nd place, silver medalist(s)
Jin Di	Skeet	122	2 Q	13	4 QB	Bronze medal match Zhang Fan (CHN); W 15-13	3rd place, bronze medalist(s)
Xu Ying	Skeet	121	4 Q	15	2 QG	Aldefhani (KUW); L 12-16	2nd place, silver medalist(s)
Zhang Fan	Skeet	123 GR	1 Q	14	3 QB	Bronze medal match Jin Di (CHN); L 13-15	4
Jin Di; Xu Ying; Zhang Fan	Skeet team	—N/a				366 AS, GR	1st place, gold medalist(s)

== Softball ==
Women

Squad list	Preliminary round		Semifinal	Bronze Medal	Rank
Squad list	Pool A	Rank	Semifinal	Bronze Medal	Rank
Chen Jia; Feng Qianwen; Guo Jia; Guo Ruomeng; Jin Lingling; Li Huan; Li Na; Li Qi; Liu Yining; Lu Ying; Sun Xue; Wang Lan; Wei Dongmei; Yuan Jingjing; Zha Dan	Chinese Taipei; L 0-2	3 Q	Philippines; W 3-0	match for final Chinese Taipei; L 3-4	3rd place, bronze medalist(s)
Chen Jia; Feng Qianwen; Guo Jia; Guo Ruomeng; Jin Lingling; Li Huan; Li Na; Li Qi; Liu Yining; Lu Ying; Sun Xue; Wang Lan; Wei Dongmei; Yuan Jingjing; Zha Dan	Philippines; W 8–2	3 Q	Philippines; W 3-0	match for final Chinese Taipei; L 3-4	3rd place, bronze medalist(s)
Chen Jia; Feng Qianwen; Guo Jia; Guo Ruomeng; Jin Lingling; Li Huan; Li Na; Li Qi; Liu Yining; Lu Ying; Sun Xue; Wang Lan; Wei Dongmei; Yuan Jingjing; Zha Dan	South Korea; W 1–0	3 Q	Philippines; W 3-0	match for final Chinese Taipei; L 3-4	3rd place, bronze medalist(s)
Chen Jia; Feng Qianwen; Guo Jia; Guo Ruomeng; Jin Lingling; Li Huan; Li Na; Li Qi; Liu Yining; Lu Ying; Sun Xue; Wang Lan; Wei Dongmei; Yuan Jingjing; Zha Dan	Thailand; W 9–2	3 Q	Philippines; W 3-0	match for final Chinese Taipei; L 3-4	3rd place, bronze medalist(s)
Chen Jia; Feng Qianwen; Guo Jia; Guo Ruomeng; Jin Lingling; Li Huan; Li Na; Li Qi; Liu Yining; Lu Ying; Sun Xue; Wang Lan; Wei Dongmei; Yuan Jingjing; Zha Dan	Japan; L 1-4	3 Q	Philippines; W 3-0	match for final Chinese Taipei; L 3-4	3rd place, bronze medalist(s)

== Squash ==
Men

Athlete	Events	Round of 32	Round of 16	Quarterfinal	Semifinal	Final
Athlete	Opposition Score	Opposition Score	Opposition Score	Opposition Score	Opposition Score	Rank
Shen Jiaqi	Men's singles	Ahmad Al-Saraj (JOR); L 9-11, 5-11, 4-11	Did not advance			
Wang Junjie	Men's singles	Tsun Man Liu (MAC); W 11-3, 11-5, 11-4	Mohd Nafiizwan Adnan (MAS); L 5-11, 7-11, 6-11	Did not advance		

Men's team

Squad list	Preliminary round		Semifinal	Final	Rank
Squad list	Group B	Rank	Semifinal	Final	Rank
Wang Junjie; Shen Jiaqi; Yang Tianxia	(Malaysia) Malaysia; L 0-3	5	Did not advance		10
Wang Junjie; Shen Jiaqi; Yang Tianxia	(Japan) Japan; L 1-2	5	Did not advance		10
Wang Junjie; Shen Jiaqi; Yang Tianxia	(India) India; L 0-3	5	Did not advance		10
Wang Junjie; Shen Jiaqi; Yang Tianxia	(Jordan) Jordan; L 0-3	5	Did not advance		10

Women

Athlete	Events	Round of 32	Round of 16	Quarterfinal	Semifinal	Final
Athlete	Opposition Score	Opposition Score	Opposition Score	Opposition Score	Opposition Score	Rank
Gu Jinyue	Women's singles	—N/a	Dipika Pallikal (IND); L 6-11, 12-10, 6-11, 4-11	Did not advance		
Li Dongjin	Women's singles	—N/a	Maria Toor Pakay (PAK); L 11-9, 11-13, 1-11, 2-11	Did not advance		

Women's team

Squad list	Preliminary round		Semifinal	Final	Rank
Squad list	Group B	Rank	Semifinal	Final	Rank
Li Dongjin; Gu Jinyue; Xiu Chen; Duan Siyu	(Pakistan) Pakistan; W 2-1	3	Did not advance		5
Li Dongjin; Gu Jinyue; Xiu Chen; Duan Siyu	(Hong Kong) Hong Kong; L 0-3	3	Did not advance		5
Li Dongjin; Gu Jinyue; Xiu Chen; Duan Siyu	(India) India; L 0-3	3	Did not advance		5

== Swimming ==
Men

Athlete	Event	Heats		Final	
Athlete	Event	Time	Rank	Time	Rank
Ning Zetao	50 m freestyle	21.94 GR	1 Q	21.95	1st place, gold medalist(s)
Yu Hexin	50 m freestyle	22.32 GR	3 Q	22.37	4
Ning Zetao	100 m freestyle	50.43	3 Q	47.70 AS, GR	1st place, gold medalist(s)
Yu Hexin	100 m freestyle	50.54	5 Q	49.50	5
Li Yunqi	200 m freestyle	1:50.43	5 Q	1:49.25	3rd place, bronze medalist(s)
Sun Yang	200 m freestyle	1:48.90	1 Q	1:45.28	2nd place, silver medalist(s)
Hao Yun	400 m freestyle	3:54.36	4 Q	3:50.38	3rd place, bronze medalist(s)
Sun Yang	400 m freestyle	3:51.17	1 Q	3:43.23	1st place, gold medalist(s)
Sun Yang	1500 m freestyle	—N/a		14:49.75	1st place, gold medalist(s)
Wang Kecheng	1500 m freestyle	—N/a		15:06.73	3rd place, bronze medalist(s)
Shi Yang	50 m butterfly	23.80	1 Q	23.46 GR	1st place, gold medalist(s)
Zhang Qibin	50 m butterfly	24.12	4 Q	23.83	5
Li Zhuhao	100 m butterfly	52.98	3 Q	51.91	2nd place, silver medalist(s)
Zhang Qibin	100 m butterfly	53.24	4 Q	52.77	5
Hao Yun	200 m butterfly	1:59.76	3 Q	1:57.80	4
Wang Pudong	200 m butterfly	1:59.83	4 Q	1:58.82	5
Ma Xiang	50 m breaststroke	28.58	6 Q	28.80	7
Wang Shuai	50 m breaststroke	28.57	5 Q	28.79	6
Li Xiang	100 m breaststroke	1:01.91	4 Q	1:00.91	3rd place, bronze medalist(s)
Mao Feilian	100 m breaststroke	1:02.76	8 Q	1:01.34	5
Li Xiang	200 m breaststroke	2:14.76	6 Q	2:12.05	5
Mao Feilian	200 m breaststroke	2:14.50	5 Q	2:11.31	4
Sun Xiaolei	50 m backstroke	25.68	6 Q	25.46	6
Xu Jiayu	50 m backstroke	25.04	2 Q	25.24	3rd place, bronze medalist(s)
Xu Jiayu	100 m backstroke	54.60	2 Q	52.81	2nd place, silver medalist(s)
Zhang Yu	100 m backstroke	57.20	12	did not advance	
Li Guangyuan	200 m backstroke	Disqualified		did not advance	
Xu Jiayu	200 m backstroke	1:58.50	1 Q	1:55.05	2nd place, silver medalist(s)
Mao Feilian	200 m individual medley	2:03.26	6 Q	2:00.69	6
Wang Shun	200 m individual medley	2:02.39	4 Q	1:59.10	3rd place, bronze medalist(s)
Huang Chaosheng	400 m individual medley	4:19.13	3 Q	4:10.49	4
Yang Zhixian	400 m individual medley	4:19.33	4 Q	4:10.18	2nd place, silver medalist(s)
Hao Yun; Xu Qiheng; Lin Yongqing; Liu Junwu; Yu Hexin; Sun Yang; Ning Zetao	4 × 100 m freestyle relay	3:19.73	2 Q	3:13.47 AS, GR	1st place, gold medalist(s)
Li Yunqi; Lin Yongqing; Mao Feilian; Xu Qiheng	4 × 200 m freestyle relay	—N/a		7:16.51	2nd place, silver medalist(s)
Jin Yan; Mao Feilian; Wang Yuxin; Yu Hexin; Xu Jiayu; Li Xiang; Li Zhuhao; Ning Zetao	4 × 100 m medley relay	3:52.25	1 Q	3:31.37 GR	1st place, gold medalist(s)

Women

Athlete	Event	Heats		Final	
Athlete	Event	Time	Rank	Time	Rank
Chen Xinyi	50 m freestyle	25.37	2 Q	24.87 GR	1st place, gold medalist(s)
Tang Yi	50 m freestyle	25.58	3 Q	25.17	3rd place, bronze medalist(s)
Shen Duo	100 m freestyle	55.25	1 Q	54.37	1st place, gold medalist(s)
Tang Yi	100 m freestyle	55.35	2 Q	54.45	2nd place, silver medalist(s)
Shen Duo	200 m freestyle	2:01.17	2 Q	1:57.66	1st place, gold medalist(s)
Tang Yi	200 m freestyle	2:01.43	4 Q	1:59.34	3rd place, bronze medalist(s)
Bi Yirong	400 m freestyle	4:12.82	2 Q	4:08.23	2nd place, silver medalist(s)
Zhang Yuhan	400 m freestyle	4:12.27	1 Q	4:07.67	1st place, gold medalist(s)
Bi Yirong	800 m freestyle	—N/a		8:27.54	1st place, gold medalist(s)
Xu Danlu	800 m freestyle	—N/a		8:33.89	2nd place, silver medalist(s)
Liu Lan	50 m butterfly	27.22	7 Q	26.72	3rd place, bronze medalist(s)
Lu Ying	50 m butterfly	26.46	1 Q	25.83 GR	1st place, gold medalist(s)
Chen Xinyi	100 m butterfly	58.56	1 Q	56.61 GR	1st place, gold medalist(s)
Lu Ying	100 m butterfly	1:00.45	5 Q	58.45	2nd place, silver medalist(s)
Jiao Liuyang	200 m butterfly	2:13.95	3 Q	2:07.56	1st place, gold medalist(s)
Liu Zige	200 m butterfly	2:14.38	4 Q	2:10.01	4
He Yuzhe	50 m breaststroke	31.83	3 Q	31.62	3rd place, bronze medalist(s)
Suo Ran	50 m breaststroke	31.59	1 Q	31.52	2nd place, silver medalist(s)
He Yun	100 m breaststroke	1:09.95	5 Q	1:08.11	3rd place, bronze medalist(s)
Shi Jinglin	100 m breaststroke	1:08.34	2 Q	1:06.67 GR	1st place, gold medalist(s)
Shi Jinglin	200 m breaststroke	2:29.43	4 Q	2:23.58	3rd place, bronze medalist(s)
Zhang Xinyu	200 m breaststroke	2:30.70	5 Q	2:26.03	5
Cheng Haihua	50 m backstroke	28.73	3 Q	28.37	5
Fu Yuanhui	50 m backstroke	27.64	1 Q	27.66	1st place, gold medalist(s)
Fu Yuanhui	100 m backstroke	1:01.88	3 Q	59.95	1st place, gold medalist(s)
Wang Xue'er	100 m backstroke	1:01.39	2 Q	1:01.09	3rd place, bronze medalist(s)
Chen Jie	200 m backstroke	2:12.93	2 Q	2:10.53	2nd place, silver medalist(s)
Fu Yuanhui	200 m backstroke	2:14.53	6 Q	2:20.46	8
Ye Shiwen	200 m individual medley	2:11.20	1 Q	2:08.94 GR	1st place, gold medalist(s)
Zhou Min	200 m individual medley	2:15.45	4 Q	2:13.16	4
Ye Shiwen	400 m individual medley	4:38.21	1 Q	4:32.97 GR	1st place, gold medalist(s)
Zhou Min	400 m individual medley	4:46.12	5 Q	4:44.49	6
Qiu Yuhan; Chen Xinyi; Sun Meichen; Zhou Yilin; Ye Shiwen; Shen Duo; Zhang Yufei; Tang Yi	4 × 100 m freestyle relay	3:39.41	1 Q	3:39.35	1st place, gold medalist(s)
Guo Junjun; Tang Yi; Cao Yue; Shen Duo	4 × 200 m freestyle relay	—N/a		7:55.17	1st place, gold medalist(s)
Wang Xue'er; He Yun; Lu Ying; Tang Yi	4 × 100 m medley relay	Disqualified		did not advance	

== Synchronized swimming ==
Synchronized swimming

Athlete	Event	Technical routine		Free routine (final)		
Athlete	Event	Points	Rank	Points	Total (technical + free)	Rank
Huang Xuechen; Sun Wenyan	Duet	91.1851	1	94.0000	185.1851	1st place, gold medalist(s)
Chen Xiaojun; Li Xiaolu; Liang Xinping; Tang Mengni; Jiang Wenwen; Yu Lele; Sun Yijing; Guo Li; Gu Xiao	Team	91.3888	1	94.3333	185.7221	1st place, gold medalist(s)
Chen Xiaojun (R); Gu Xiao; Guo Li; Huang Xuechen; Li Xiaolu ﴾R﴿ Liang Xinping; Sun Wenyan; Sun Yijing; Tang Mengni; Yin Chengxin; Yu Lele; Zeng Zhen	combination	—N/a			94.9667	1st place, gold medalist(s)

== Table tennis ==
Men's

Athlete	Event	1/32 round	1/16 round	1/8 final	Quarterfinal	Semifinal	Final	Rank
Xu Xin	Singles	Bye	Bajra (NEP); W 4-0; 11-4, 11-2, 11-3,11-2	Chien-an (TPE); W 4-3; 10-12,6-11,11-5, 10-12, 11-3, 11-7,11-8	Ning (SIN); W 4-0; 13-11, 11-9, 11-5,11-5	Se-hyuk (KOR); W 4-0; 11-2, 11-5, 11-2,11-7	Zhendong (CHN); W 4-2; 11-6,5-11,11-13,11-7, 12-10,11-8	1st place, gold medalist(s)
Fan Zhendong	Singles	Bye	Hoi (MAC); W 4-0; 11-1, 11-6, 11-2,11-4	Hu (SIN); W 4-0; 12-10, 11-7, 11-6,11-3	Niwa (JPN); W 4-0; 11-4, 11-6, 12-10,11-7	Chih-yuan (TPE); W 4-0; 11-8, 11-9, 11-8,11-7	Xu Xin (CHN); L 2-4; 6-11,11-5,13-11,7-11, 10-12,8-11	2nd place, silver medalist(s)
Ma Long; Zhang Jike	Doubles		Jaber M (KUW); Mansour (KUW) w/o	Norouzi (IRI); Alamian (IRI); W 3-0; 11-4, 11-7, 11-3	Jung-woo (KOR); Min-seok (KOR); W 3-2; 11-6,11-13,12-10,4-11,11-6	Niwa (JPN); Kenta (JPN); W 4-1; 8-11,11-9, 11-4, 11-8,11-9	Xu Xin (CHN); Zhendong (CHN); W 4-0; 14-12, 11-3, 11-7,11-6	1st place, gold medalist(s)
Xu Xin; Fan Zhendong	Doubles		Suwal A (NEP); Gothe SS (NEP); W 3-0; 11-3, 11-3, 11-3	Ghosh S (IND); Desai HR (IND); W 3-1; 11-5,9-11, 11-1, 11-5	Peng (HKG); Wong CT (HKG); W 3- 0; 11-6,13-11, 11-1	Gao Ning (SIN); Li Hu (table tennis) (SIN); W 4-1; 11-13,11-8,11-5, 11-8,11-9	Ma Long (CHN); Zhang Jike (CHN); L 0-4; 12-14,3- 11, 7-11,6-11	2nd place, silver medalist(s)

Men's team

Squad list	Preliminary round		Quarterfinals	Semifinal	Final	Rank
Squad list	Group A	Rank	Quarterfinals	Semifinal	Final	Rank
Xu Xin; Fan Zhendong; Ma Long; Zhang Jike; Zhou Yu	(Laos) Laos; W 3-0	1 Q	(India) India; W 3-0	(Japan) Japan; W 3-0	(South Korea) South Korea; W 3-0	1st place, gold medalist(s)
Xu Xin; Fan Zhendong; Ma Long; Zhang Jike; Zhou Yu	(Saudi Arabia) Saudi Arabia; W 3-0	1 Q	(India) India; W 3-0	(Japan) Japan; W 3-0	(South Korea) South Korea; W 3-0	1st place, gold medalist(s)
Xu Xin; Fan Zhendong; Ma Long; Zhang Jike; Zhou Yu	(Singapore) Singapore; W 3-2	1 Q	(India) India; W 3-0	(Japan) Japan; W 3-0	(South Korea) South Korea; W 3-0	1st place, gold medalist(s)

Women's

Athlete	Event	1/32 round	1/16 round	1/8 final	Quarterfinal	Semifinal	Final	Rank
Liu Shiwen	Singles	Bye	Douangpanya (LAO); W 4-0; 11-4, 11-3, 11-1,11-7	Mi-gyong (PRK); W' 4-1; 11-9, 11-8,6-11 11-9,11-4	Ching (HKG); W 4-0; 11-8, 11-3, 11-7,11-7	Ha-eun (KOR); W 4-0; 11-3, 11-5, 11-1,11-7	Yuling (CHN); W 4-0; 11-6,11-4, 13-11,11-7	1st place, gold medalist(s)
Zhu Yuling	Singles	Bye	Rou (MAS); W 4-0; 11-5, 11-3, 11-2,11-3	Nam (HKG); W 4-0; 11-4, 15-13, 11-3,11-9	Hyo-won (KOR); W 4-0; 11-4, 11-3, 11-8,11-8	Tianwei (SIN); W 4-0; 13-11,13-11,14- 12-11-8	Shiwen (CHN); L 0-4; 6-11,4-11,11- 13,7-11	2nd place, silver medalist(s)
Zhu Yuling; Chen Meng	Doubles		Southamm (LAO); Douangpanya (LAO); W 3-0; 11-4, 11-8, 11-5	Patkar MS (IND); Aggarwal N (IND); W 3-0; 11-2, 11-7, 11-6	Fukuhara (JPN); Wakamiya (JPN); W 3-0; 11-5,11-3, 16-14	Ching (HKG); Nam (HKG); W 4-1; 4-11,11-9, 11-5, 11-4,11-4	Shiwen (CHN); Yang (CHN); W 4-0; 12-10,11-6,8-11, 8-11, 11-3,12-10	1st place, gold medalist(s)
Liu Shiwen; Wu Yang	Doubles		Bye	Lin Ye (SIN); Zhou Yihan (SIN); W 3- 0; 12-10, 11-4, 12-10	Ha-eun (KOR); Park Y (KOR); W 3- 0; 11-6, 11-7, 11-8	Kim Jong (PRK); Kim Hye-song (PRK); W 4- 1; 11-5,7-11, 11-9,11-8,11-4	Yuling (CHN); Meng (CHN); L 2-4; 10-12,6-11,3- 11, 11-8,11-8,3-11,10-12	2nd place, silver medalist(s)

Women's team

Squad list	Preliminary round		Quarterfinals	Semifinal	Final	Rank
Squad list	Group A	Rank	Quarterfinals	Semifinal	Final	Rank
Liu Shiwen; Wu Yang; Zhu Yuling; Chen Meng; Ding Ning	(Nepal) Nepal; W 3-0	1 Q	(Chinese Taipei) Chinese Taipei; W 3-0	(North Korea) North Korea; W 3-0	(Japan) Japan; W 3-1	1st place, gold medalist(s)
Liu Shiwen; Wu Yang; Zhu Yuling; Chen Meng; Ding Ning	(Malaysia) Malaysia; W 3-0	1 Q	(Chinese Taipei) Chinese Taipei; W 3-0	(North Korea) North Korea; W 3-0	(Japan) Japan; W 3-1	1st place, gold medalist(s)
Liu Shiwen; Wu Yang; Zhu Yuling; Chen Meng; Ding Ning	(India) India; W 3-0	1 Q	(Chinese Taipei) Chinese Taipei; W 3-0	(North Korea) North Korea; W 3-0	(Japan) Japan; W 3-1	1st place, gold medalist(s)

Mixed

Athlete	Event	1/32 round	1/16 round	1/8 final	Quarterfinal	Semifinal	Final	Rank
Chen Meng; Fan Zhendong	Mixed Doubles	Bye	Shareef (MDV); Naseem (MDV); W 3-0; 11-2, 11-2, 11-3	Chien-an (TPE); Yi-hua (TPE); W 3-2; 11-5, 8-11,11-7,7-11,11-8	Hyok-bong (PRK); Jong (PRK); L 2-3; 8-11,11-6, 11-9,11-8,7-11,5-11	Did not advance		
Zhou Yu; Wu Yang	Mixed Doubles	Bye	Nabita S (NEP); Suwal A (NEP); W 3-0; 11-2, 11-5, 11-5	Ye (SIN); Zi (SIN); W 3-1; 2-11,11-5, 11-9, 11-4	Ching (HKG); Tianyi (HKG); L 0-3; 9-11, 8-11,8-11	Did not advance		

== Taekwondo ==
Men

Athlete	Event	1/16 final	1/8 final	Quarterfinal	Semifinal	Final	Rank
Zhao Shuai	58 kg	Natsagdorj (MGL); W 13 - 0	Alshhareef (KSA); W 17 - 2	Ashourzadeh (IRI); L 10-11	did not advance		5
Huang Jiannan	68 kg	Bye	Zaw (MYA); W 10 - 4	LO (TPE); W 8 - 2	Semrano (PHI); W 16 - 3	Behnam Asbaghi (IRI); L 4-5	2nd place, silver medalist(s)
Wang Guangshuai	74 kg	Sila (THA); L 7-12	did not advance				17
Qiao Sen	80 kg		Arshad (PAK); W 14 - 5	Yong (KOR); W 13 - 12	Rafalovich (KAZ); L 5-6	Did not advance	3rd place, bronze medalist(s)
Chen Linglong	87 kg		Bye	Uy (PHI); W 5-3	Tantramant (THA); W 11-9	Baykuziev (UZB); L 3 - 6	2nd place, silver medalist(s)
Yang Yi	+87 kg			Gulov (TJK); L 3 - 4	did not advance		5

Women

Athlete	Event	1/16 final	1/8 final	Quarterfinal	Semifinal	Final	Rank
Li Zhaoyi	49 kg		Samdansuren (MGL); W 9 - 5	Yamada (JPN); W 8 - 2	Ilao (PHI); W 5 - 1	Sonkham (THA); L 3 - 10	2nd place, silver medalist(s)
Wu Jingyu	53 kg		Gurbanova (TKM); W 17 - 2	Narbabaeva (UZB); W 16 - 3	Jeong (KOR); L 4 - 6	Did not advance	3rd place, bronze medalist(s)
Wang Yun	57 kg		Lopez (PHI); W 3 - 0	Alzak (KAZ); W 5 -1	Hamada (JPN); L 0 - 0	Did not advance	3rd place, bronze medalist(s)
Zhang Hua	62 kg		Bye	Sarah (KUW); W 19 - 0	Chia-chia (TPE); W 5 -2	Da-bin (KOR); L 7 - 8	2nd place, silver medalist(s)
Guo Yunfei	67 kg		Bibalayeva (KAZ); W 8 - 2	Narra (PHI); W 5 -0	Liu (MAC); W 6 -5	Lee Won-jin (KOR); W 2-1	1st place, gold medalist(s)
Li Donghua	+73 kg		Bye	Regi (IND); W 15 - 1	Khalimova (TJK); W 7 - 11	Khodabandeh (IRI); W 10-8	1st place, gold medalist(s)

== Tennis ==
Men

Athlete	Event	Round 1	Round 2	Round 3	Quarter Final	Semi Final	Final	Rank
Athlete	Event	Opposition Result	Opposition Result	Opposition Result	Opposition Result	Opposition Result	Opposition Result	Rank
Zhang Ze	Singles	Bye	Mam (CAM); W 2-0; 6-0 6-1	Udomchoke (THA); L 1-2; 5-7 6-3 3-6	Did Not Advance			9
Wu Di	Singles	Bye	Susanto (INA); W 2-0; 6-0 6-3	Ismailov (UZB); L 0-2; 4-6 4-6	Did Not Advance			9
Gong Maoxin; Li Zhe	Doubles		Khan (PAK); Abid (PAK); W 2-0; 6-3 6-1	Ernepesov (TKM); Pochay (TKM); W 2-0; 6-2 6-0	Ratiwatana (THA); Ratiwatana (THA); L 0-2; 6^{4}-7^{7} 5-7	Did Not Advance		5
Bai Yan; Wang Chuhan	Doubles		Yeu (TPE); Hsin (TPE); L 0-2; 4-6 2-6	Did Not Advance				17
Gong Maoxin; Li Zhe; Wu Di; Zhang Ze	team		Bye	(Pakistan); Pakistan; W 3-0	(Chinese Taipei); Chinese Taipei; W 2-1	(Japan); Japan; W 2-1	(Kazakhstan); Kazakhstan; L 1-2	2nd place, silver medalist(s)

Women

Athlete	Event	Round 1	Round 2	Round 3	Quarter Final	Semi Final	Final	Rank
Athlete	Event	Opposition Result	Opposition Result	Opposition Result	Opposition Result	Opposition Result	Opposition Result	Rank
Duan Yingying	Singles	Bye	Beliaeva (KGZ); W 2-0; 6-1 6-0	Kerimbayeva (KAZ); W 2-0; 6-2 6-2	Hozumi (JPN); L 0-2; 2-6 5-7	Did Not Advance		5
Wang Qiang	Singles	Bye	Palkina (KGZ); W 2-0; 6-4 6-0	Fatma (OMA); W 2-0; 6-3 6-3	Ling (HKG); W 2-0; 6-4 6-4	Eguchi (JPN); W 2-0; 3-6 6-2 6-1	Kumkhum (THA); W 2-0; 6-3 7^{7}-6^{5}	1st place, gold medalist(s)
Zheng Saisai; Duan Yingying	Doubles		Bye	Han (KOR); Yoo Mi (KOR); W 2-1; 6-2 3-6 7^{10}-6^{8}	Chan (TPE); Yung (TPE); L 0-2; 2-6 4-6	Did Not Advance		5
Wang Qiang; Liu Fangzhou	Doubles		So-ra (KOR); Ji-Hee (KOR); W 2-0; 7-5 6-4	Chin-wei (TPE); Su-wei (TPE); L 0-2; 6-2 6-0	Did Not Advance			9
Duan Yingying; Zhang Shuai; Zheng Jie; Zheng Saisai	Team			Bye	(Hong Kong); Hong Kong; W 3-0	(Japan); Japan; W 3-0	(Chinese Taipei); Chinese Taipei; L 1-2	2nd place, silver medalist(s)

Mixed Doubles

Athlete	Event	Round 1	Quarter Final	Semi Final	Final	Rank
Athlete	Event	Opposition Result	Opposition Result	Opposition Result	Opposition Result	Rank
Wu Di; Zheng Saisai	Mixed Doubles	Duldaev (KGZ); Palkina (KGZ); W 2-0; 6-2 6-0	Sugita (JPN); Aoyama (JPN); L 0-2; 3-6 6-7	Did Not Advance		5
Zhang Ze; Zheng Jie	Mixed Doubles	Bye	Mam (CAM); Daravy (CAM); W 2-0; 6-1 6-2	Udomchoke (THA); Tanasugarn (THA); W 2-1; 6-4 2-6 13-11	Myneni (IND); Mirza (IND); L 0-2; 1-6 3-6	3rd place, bronze medalist(s)

== Triathlon ==
Men

Athlete	Event	Swim (1.5 km)	Trans 1	Bike (40 km)	Trans 2	Run (10 km)	Total Time	Rank
Faquan Bai	Men's	17:57	0:28	58:57	0:22	31:57	1:49:41	3rd place, bronze medalist(s)
Xu Zheng	Men's	17:49	0:30	59:03	0:22	33:39	1:51:23	5

Women

Athlete	Event	Swim (1.5 km)	Trans 1	Bike (40 km)	Trans 2	Run (10 km)	Total Time	Rank
Lianyuan Wang	Women's	20:05	0:34	1:05:59	0:34	36:01	2:03:13	3rd place, bronze medalist(s)
Yuting Huang	Women's	20:02	0:32	1:06:02	0:26	36:16	2:03:18	4

Mixed team relay

Athlete	Event	Leg 1	Leg 2	Leg 3	Leg 4	Total Time	Rank
Lingxi Xin; Zhengyu Duan; Yuting Huamng; Faquan Bai	Mixed team relay	20:15	19:08	20:33	19:20	1:19:16	3rd place, bronze medalist(s)

== Volleyball ==
=== Indoor ===
Men

Squad list	Preliminary round		Play-off 1–8		Quarterfinal	Semifinal	Final	Rank
Squad list	Group D	Rank	Group F	Rank	Quarterfinal	Semifinal	Final	Rank
Yuan Zhi; Liang Chunlong; Zhong Weijun; Cui Jianjun; Geng Xin; Kou Zhichao; Xu Jingtao; Li Runming; Ren Qi; Ji Daoshuai; Mao Tianyi; Zhang Chen	Myanmar; W 3–0; 25–11, 25–12, 25–18	1 Q	Kuwait; W 3–1; 24–26,25–20, 25–12, 25–19	2 Q	Qatar; W 3–1; 25–23,20-25, 25–23, 25–21	Iran; L 0-3; 15–25,15–25,19–25,	Bronze medal South Korea; L 1-3; 25-20,20–25,13–25,22–25,	4
Yuan Zhi; Liang Chunlong; Zhong Weijun; Cui Jianjun; Geng Xin; Kou Zhichao; Xu Jingtao; Li Runming; Ren Qi; Ji Daoshuai; Mao Tianyi; Zhang Chen	Turkmenistan; W 3–0; 25–15, 25–8, 25–10	1 Q	Japan; L 0-3; 18–25,20–25,17–25,	2 Q	Qatar; W 3–1; 25–23,20-25, 25–23, 25–21	Iran; L 0-3; 15–25,15–25,19–25,	Bronze medal South Korea; L 1-3; 25-20,20–25,13–25,22–25,	4
Yuan Zhi; Liang Chunlong; Zhong Weijun; Cui Jianjun; Geng Xin; Kou Zhichao; Xu Jingtao; Li Runming; Ren Qi; Ji Daoshuai; Mao Tianyi; Zhang Chen	Thailand; W 3–0; 25–16, 25–19, 25–22	1 Q			Qatar; W 3–1; 25–23,20-25, 25–23, 25–21	Iran; L 0-3; 15–25,15–25,19–25,	Bronze medal South Korea; L 1-3; 25-20,20–25,13–25,22–25,	4

Women

Squad list	Preliminary round		Quarterfinal	Semifinal	Final	Rank
Squad list	Group C	Rank	Quarterfinal	Semifinal	Final	Rank
Zhong Weijun; Ding Xia; HUANG Liuyan; Li Jing; Liu Yanhan; Qiao Ting; Wang Qi; Wang Qian; Yan Ni; Yao Di; Yin Na; Zhang Changning; Zhanf Xiaoya	Kazakhstan; W 3–0; 25–14, 25–11, 25–14	1 Q	India; W 3–0; 25–11,25–12, 25–10	Thailand; W 3–1; 19-25,25–23,25–15, 25–19	South Korea; L 0-3; 20–25,13–25,21–25,	2nd place, silver medalist(s)
Zhong Weijun; Ding Xia; HUANG Liuyan; Li Jing; Liu Yanhan; Qiao Ting; Wang Qi; Wang Qian; Yan Ni; Yao Di; Yin Na; Zhang Changning; Zhanf Xiaoya	Hong Kong; W 3–0; 25–10, 25–12, 25–7	1 Q	India; W 3–0; 25–11,25–12, 25–10	Thailand; W 3–1; 19-25,25–23,25–15, 25–19	South Korea; L 0-3; 20–25,13–25,21–25,	2nd place, silver medalist(s)
Zhong Weijun; Ding Xia; HUANG Liuyan; Li Jing; Liu Yanhan; Qiao Ting; Wang Qi; Wang Qian; Yan Ni; Yao Di; Yin Na; Zhang Changning; Zhanf Xiaoya	Maldives; W 3–0; 25–7, 25–7, 25–6	1 Q	India; W 3–0; 25–11,25–12, 25–10	Thailand; W 3–1; 19-25,25–23,25–15, 25–19	South Korea; L 0-3; 20–25,13–25,21–25,	2nd place, silver medalist(s)
Zhong Weijun; Ding Xia; HUANG Liuyan; Li Jing; Liu Yanhan; Qiao Ting; Wang Qi; Wang Qian; Yan Ni; Yao Di; Yin Na; Zhang Changning; Zhanf Xiaoya	Chinese Taipei; W 3–0; 25–17, 26–24, 25–22	1 Q	India; W 3–0; 25–11,25–12, 25–10	Thailand; W 3–1; 19-25,25–23,25–15, 25–19	South Korea; L 0-3; 20–25,13–25,21–25,	2nd place, silver medalist(s)

== Water polo ==
Men

Squad list	Preliminary round		Quarterfinals	Semifinal	Final	Rank
Squad list	Group B	Rank	Quarterfinals	Semifinal	Final	Rank
WU Honghui; Tan Feihu; Liang Zhongxing; Yu Lijun; Guo Junliang; Pan Ning; Li Bin; Wang Yang; Dong Tao; Chen Jinghao; Zhang Chufeng; Liang Nianxiang; Liang Zhiwei	Japan; L 9-12	2 Q	Singapore; W 25-5	Kazakhstan; L 9-11	Bronze Medal Match; South Korea; W 14-6	3rd place, bronze medalist(s)
WU Honghui; Tan Feihu; Liang Zhongxing; Yu Lijun; Guo Junliang; Pan Ning; Li Bin; Wang Yang; Dong Tao; Chen Jinghao; Zhang Chufeng; Liang Nianxiang; Liang Zhiwei	Kuwait; W 18-4	2 Q	Singapore; W 25-5	Kazakhstan; L 9-11	Bronze Medal Match; South Korea; W 14-6	3rd place, bronze medalist(s)

Women

Squad list	Game 1	Game 2	Game 3	Game 4	Game 5	Rank
Yang Jun; Li Shujin; Liu Ping; Sun Yujun; Chen Huili; Sun Yating; Song Donglun; Zhang Cong; Zhao Zihan; Tian Jianing; Wang Xinyan; Lu Yiwen; Peng Lin	Japan; W 15-10	Singapore; W 26-3	Uzbekistan; L 14-4	Hong Kong; W 20-5	Kazakhstan; W 11-6	1st place, gold medalist(s)

== Weightlifting ==
Men

Athlete	Event	Snatch	Clean & Jerk	Total	Rank
Wu Jingbiao	56 kg	133	155	288	3rd place, bronze medalist(s)
Chen Lijun	62 kg	143	178	321	2nd place, silver medalist(s)
Lin Qingfeng	69 kg	158 GR	184	342	1st place, gold medalist(s)
Lü Xiaojun	77 kg	175 GR	200	375	1st place, gold medalist(s)
Tian Tao	85 kg	163	218 GR	381 GR	1st place, gold medalist(s)
Liu Hao	94 kg	173	221	394	1st place, gold medalist(s)
Yang Zhe	105 kg	186	217	403	1st place, gold medalist(s)
Ai Yunan	+105 kg	190k	235	425	2nd place, silver medalist(s)

Women

Athlete	Event	Snatch	Clean & Jerk	Total	Rank
Tian Yuan	48 kg	81	~~102~~	—	DNF
Zhang Wanqiong	53 kg	102	126	228	3rd place, bronze medalist(s)
Wang Shuai	58 kg	109	126	235	2nd place, silver medalist(s)
Deng Wei	63 kg	115	144 WR, AR, GR	259	2nd place, silver medalist(s)
Xiang Yanmei	69 kg	118 GR	150	268 GR	1st place, gold medalist(s)
Kang Yue	75 kg	131 GR	160 GR	291 GR	2nd place, silver medalist(s)
Zhou Lulu	+75 kg	142 GR	192 WR, AR, GR	334 AR, GR	1st place, gold medalist(s)

== Wrestling ==
Men's freestyle

Athlete	Event	1/8 final	Quarterfinal	Semifinal	Final	Rank
Hong Xiaobin	57 kg	Yun (KOR); L 2–13	did not advance			11
Yeerlanbieke Katai	65 kg	Bye	Zhumagaziyev (UZB); W 4^{F} - 6	Dutt (IND); L 7 -9^{F}	3rd place match Jin-hyok (PRK); W 11 - 6	3rd place, bronze medalist(s)
Ling Haiwei	70 kg	Htwe (MYA); W 6^{F} - 0	Abdurakhmono (UZB); L 0-10^{F}	Repechage match Vokhidov (TJK); W 8-7	3rd place match Kojima (JPN); L 0-8	5
Zhang Chongyao	74 kg	Gombodorj (MGL); W 10–3	Lee (KOR); L 6-10	did not advance		7
Zhang Feng	86 kg	Jokar (IRI); L 1-11		Repechage match Kumar (IND); W 4–1	3rd place match Kim (KOR); L 0-10	5
Cui Xiaocheng	97 kg	Iskandari (TJK); L 0-10	did not advance			9
Deng Zhiwei	125 kg	Parviz Hadi (IRI); L 1-11		Repechage match Chuluunbat (MGL); L 10-16	Did not advance	7

Men's Greco-Roman

Athlete	Event	1/8 final	Quarterfinal	Semifinal	Final	Rank
Tian Qiye	59 kg	Kohei Hasegawa (JPN); L 0-11		Repechage match Sharifzoda (TJK); W 3^{C}–0	3rd place match Young-jun (KOR); W 4–1	3rd place, bronze medalist(s)
Zheng Pan	66 kg	Ryu (KOR); L 0-4^{C}		Repechage match Byabangard (IRI); L 3-5	Did not advance	7
Yang Bin	75 kg	Bye	Kartikov (KAZ)} L 0-8^{F}	did not advance		11
Chen Weiwei	80 kg		Kenjeev (KGZ); L 0-4^{F}	did not advance		8
Peng Fei	85 kg	Bye	Kumar (JOR); W 4–0	Assakalov (UZB); L 5-9	3rd place match Tursynov (KAZ); W 3–2	3rd place, bronze medalist(s)
Xiao Di	98 kg	Tabeekh (SYR); W 10–0	Saikawa (JPN); W 3–3	Saparmamedov (TKM); W 2–0	Aliyari (IRI); W 0-8	2nd place, silver medalist(s)
Meng Qiang	130 kg	Bye	Nadhim (IRQ); W 8–0	Kim Yong-min (KOR); L 1-3	3rd place match Marafi (JOR); W 7–2	3rd place, bronze medalist(s)

Women's freestyle

Athlete	Event	1/8 final	Quarterfinal	Semifinal	Final	Rank
Sun Yanan	48 kg	Amanzhol (KAZ); W 8-3	Filippova (TKM); W 12-2	Muangpor (KAZ); W 10-0	Tosaka (JPN); L 1-5	2nd place, silver medalist(s)
Zhong Xuechun	55 kg	Yoshida (JPN); L 9 -12		Repechage match Loan (VIE); W 14^{F} -3	3rd place match Kumari (IND); W 10 - 2	3rd place, bronze medalist(s)
Xiluo Zhuoma	63 kg	Sultamuratova (UZB); W 6^{F} - 0	Hiền (UZB); W 4^{F}-0	Jakhar (IND); W 11^{F}-2	3rd place match Watari (JPN); L 4-4	2nd place, silver medalist(s)
Zhou Feng	75 kg		Hamaguchi (JPN); W 2–1	Burmaa (MGL); W 3-2	Manyurova (KAZ); W 11-0	1st place, gold medalist(s)

== Wushu ==
Men's sanda

Athlete	Event	Round of 16	Quarterfinal	Semifinal	Final	Rank
Zhao Fuxiang	56 kg	Mohammadzadeh (IRI); W 2-0	Kyaw (MYA); W 2-0	Solis (PHI); W WO	Giang (VIE); W 2-0	1st place, gold medalist(s)
Kong Hongxing	60 kg	Rustam Ibragimo (KGZ); W 2–0	Wa (HKG); W 2–1	Yeong-sik (KOR); W 2–0	Saclag (PHI); W 2–0	1st place, gold medalist(s)
Chen Hongxing	65 kg	Al-Daajeh (JOR); W 2–0	Tài (VIE); W 2–1	Mohammadseyfi (IRI); L 0-2	Did not advance	3rd place, bronze medalist(s)
Zhang Kun	70 kg		Hamdi (JOR); W 2–0	Shah (PAK); W TV	Sang-hoon (KOR); W 2-0	1st place, gold medalist(s)

Men's taolu

Athlete	Event	Nanquan		Nangun		Total	
Athlete	Event	Score	Rank	Score	Rank	Score	Rank
Wang Di	Nanquan/Nangun	9.77	1	9.78	1	19.55	1st place, gold medalist(s)

Athlete	Event	Taijijian		Taijiquan		Total	
Athlete	Event	Score	Rank	Score	Rank	Score	Rank
Chen Zhouli	Taijijian/Taijiquan	9.77	1	9.78	1	19.55	1st place, gold medalist(s)

Athlete	Event	Daoshu		Gunshu		Total	
Athlete	Event	Score	Rank	Score	Rank	Score	Rank
Sun Peiyuan	Daoshu/Gunshu	9.77	1	9.77	1	19.54	1st place, gold medalist(s)

Women's sanda

Athlete	Event	Round of 16	Quarterfinal	Semifinal	Final	Rank
Zhang Luan	52 kg	Hoài (VIE); W 2–0	Mambetova (KGZ); W 2–0	Devi (IND); W 2–0	Mansourian (IRI); W 2-0	1st place, gold medalist(s)
Wang Cong	60 kg		Mansourian (IRI); W 2-0	Ly (VIE); W 2-0	Yu (TPE); W 2-0	1st place, gold medalist(s)

Women's taolu

Athlete	Event	Score	Rank
Kan Wencong	Changquan	9.75	1st place, gold medalist(s)

Athlete	Event	Nandao		Nanquan		Total	
Athlete	Event	Score	Rank	Score	Rank	Score	Rank
Wei Hong	Nandao/Nanquan	9.72	1	9.43	2	19.15	2nd place, silver medalist(s)

Athlete	Event	Taijiquan		Taijijian		Total	
Athlete	Event	Score	Rank	Score	Rank	Score	Rank
Yu Mengmeng	Taijiquan/Taijijian	9.75	1	9.75	1	19.50	1st place, gold medalist(s)
