= Shooting at the 2014 Asian Games – Women's double trap =

Women's double trap at the 2014 Asian Games
- Venue: Gyeonggido Shooting Range
- Dates: 25 September 2014
- Competitors: 19 from 7 nations

Medalists
gold medal	Kim Mi-jin	South Korea
silver medal	Zhang Yafei	China
bronze medal	Bai Yiting	China

The women's double trap competition at the 2014 Asian Games in Incheon, South Korea was held on 25 September at the Gyeonggido Shooting Range.

== Schedule ==
All times are Korea Standard Time (UTC+09:00)

Date	Time	Event
Thursday, 25 September 2014	09:00	Final

== Records ==
Prior to this competition, the existing world, Asian and Games records were as follows.

World Record	—	—	—	—
Asian Record	—	—	—	—
Games Record	—	—	—	—

== Results ==
Rank	Athlete	Round				Total	S-off	Notes
Rank	Athlete	1	2	3	4	Total	S-off	Notes
1st place, gold medalist(s)	Kim Mi-jin (KOR)	29	27	26	28	110		WR
2nd place, silver medalist(s)	Zhang Yafei (CHN)	26	30	26	26	108		
3rd place, bronze medalist(s)	Bai Yiting (CHN)	27	28	26	26	107		
4	Son Hye-kyoung (KOR)	25	27	27	26	105		
5	Zhu Mei (CHN)	23	23	26	28	100		
6	Mariya Dmitriyenko (KAZ)	26	25	26	23	100		
7	Lee Bo-na (KOR)	25	25	26	23	99		
8	Shagun Chowdhary (IND)	24	25	24	23	96		
9	Chattaya Kitcharoen (THA)	25	24	24	23	96		
10	Shreyasi Singh (IND)	24	22	22	26	94		
11	Lin Yi-chun (TPE)	23	24	23	24	94		
12	Varsha Varman (IND)	23	21	24	21	89		
13	Hsu Jie-yu (TPE)	24	24	18	22	88		
14	Nanpapas Viravaidya (THA)	17	25	24	20	86		
15	Huang Yen-hua (TPE)	22	22	24	18	86		
16	Anastassiya Davydova (KAZ)	17	23	24	20	84		
17	Vilavan Muneemongkoltorn (THA)	21	20	21	15	77		
18	Ray Bassil (LIB)	17	17	20	21	75		
19	Oxana Sereda (KAZ)	15	17	13	17	62		
