= Cycling at the 2014 Asian Games – Women's cross-country =

Women's cross-country at the 2014 Asian Games
- Venue: Yeongjong Baegunsan MTB Course
- Date: 30 September 2014
- Competitors: 9 from 6 nations

Medalists
gold medal	Shi Qinglan	China
silver medal	Yang Ling	China
bronze medal	Yukari Nakagome	Japan

The women's cross-country competition at the 2014 Asian Games was held on 30 September 2014 at the Yeongjong Baegunsan MTB Course.

== Schedule ==
All times are Korea Standard Time (UTC+09:00)

Date	Time	Event
Tuesday, 30 September 2014	14:00	Final

== Results ==
Rank	Athlete	Time
1st place, gold medalist(s)	Shi Qinglan (CHN)	1:17:06
2nd place, silver medalist(s)	Yang Ling (CHN)	1:23:02
3rd place, bronze medalist(s)	Yukari Nakagome (JPN)	1:30:29
4	Tüvshinjargalyn Enkhjargal (MGL)	1:34:59
5	Kusmawati Yazid (INA)	1:35:36
6	Yoo Da-jeong (KOR)	1:36:36
7	Wilhelmina Tutuarima (INA)	1:36:57
8	Batbaataryn Orkhontuyaa (MGL)	−1 lap
9	Laxmi Magar (NEP)	−2 laps
