= Cycling at the 2014 Asian Games – Women's BMX racing =

Women's racing at the 2014 Asian Games
- Venue: Ganghwa Asiad BMX Track
- Date: 1 October 2014
- Competitors: 8 from 5 nations

Medalists
gold medal	Amanda Carr	Thailand
silver medal	Lu Yan	China
bronze medal	Peng Na	China

The women's BMX racing competition at the 2014 Asian Games in Incheon was held on 1 October 2014 at the Ganghwa Asiad BMX Track.

== Schedule ==
All times are Korea Standard Time (UTC+09:00)

Date	Time	Event
Wednesday, 1 October 2014	11:45	Seeding run
Wednesday, 1 October 2014	13:12	Motos

== Results ==
=== Seeding run ===
Rank	Athlete	Time
1	Amanda Carr (THA)	37.328
2	Lu Yan (CHN)	37.956
3	Peng Na (CHN)	39.481
4	Elga Kharisma Novanda (INA)	39.618
5	Park Mi-ni (KOR)	41.484
6	Yuri Yamanomoto (JPN)	42.177
7	Miki Iibata (JPN)	42.204
8	Duangkamon Thongmee (THA)	43.050

=== Motos ===
Rank	Athlete	Run 1		Run 2		Run 3		Total
Rank	Athlete	Time	Pts	Time	Pts	Time	Pts	Total
1st place, gold medalist(s)	Amanda Carr (THA)	37.392	1	37.178	1	37.159	1	3
2nd place, silver medalist(s)	Lu Yan (CHN)	37.764	2	38.239	2	38.700	3	7
3rd place, bronze medalist(s)	Peng Na (CHN)	39.869	4	38.935	3	38.334	2	9
4	Elga Kharisma Novanda (INA)	39.435	3	40.368	4	40.640	4	11
5	Park Mi-ni (KOR)	41.757	5	40.761	5	41.203	6	16
6	Yuri Yamanomoto (JPN)	50.677	8	41.435	6	40.717	5	19
7	Miki Iibata (JPN)	42.386	6	42.331	7	1:27.564	8	21
8	Duangkamon Thongmee (THA)	43.416	7	42.610	8	44.031	7	22
