= Sailing at the 2014 Asian Games – Girls' Optimist =

Maritime racing event

Girls' Optimist at the 2014 Asian Games
- Venue: Wangsan Marina
- Date: 24–30 September 2014
- Competitors: 8 from 8 nations

Medalists
gold medal	Jodie Lai	Singapore
silver medal	Yu Huijia	China
bronze medal	Kamonchanok Klahan	Thailand

The girls' Optimist competition at the 2014 Asian Games in Incheon was held from 24 to 30 September 2014. It was an under-16 event and girls born on or after 1 January 1999 were eligible to compete.

== Schedule ==
All times are Korea Standard Time (UTC+09:00)

Date	Time	Event
Wednesday, 24 September 2014	12:00	Race 1
Wednesday, 24 September 2014	12:00	Race 2
Wednesday, 24 September 2014	12:00	Race 3
Wednesday, 24 September 2014	12:00	Race 4
Thursday, 25 September 2014	11:00	Race 5
Thursday, 25 September 2014	11:00	Race 6
Friday, 26 September 2014	11:00	Race 7
Friday, 26 September 2014	11:00	Race 8
Saturday, 27 September 2014	11:00	Race 9
Saturday, 27 September 2014	11:00	Race 10
Tuesday, 30 September 2014	11:00	Race 11
Tuesday, 30 September 2014	11:00	Race 12

== Results ==
Legend

- OCS — On course side
- RAF — Retired after finishing

Rank	Athlete	Race												Total
Rank	Athlete	1	2	3	4	5	6	7	8	9	10	11	12	Total
1st place, gold medalist(s)	Jodie Lai (SIN)	2	~~(4)~~	2	1	4	1	1	3	1	3	1	3	22
2nd place, silver medalist(s)	Yu Huijia (CHN)	3	1	3	4	1	~~(7)~~	5	1	2	1	3	2	26
3rd place, bronze medalist(s)	Kamonchanok Klahan (THA)	1	2	1	2	3	3	~~(4)~~	2	4	2	2	4	26
4	Nor Nabila Natasha Nazri (MAS)	4	3	4	3	2	2	3	~~(5)~~	5	4	4	1	35
5	Kim Da-jeong (KOR)	5	~~(7)~~	5	5	7	4	6	4	3	7	5	5	56
6	Samiha Al-Riyami (OMA)	~~(9)~~; OCS	5	9 RAF	6	5	6	2	6	7	5	7	7	65
7	Ramya Saravanan (IND)	6	6	6	~~(7)~~	6	5	7	7	6	6	6	6	67
8	Salama Al-Mansoori (UAE)	7	~~(9)~~; OCS	7	8	8	8	8	8	8	8	8	8	86
