= Li Hexin =

Chinese handball player (born 1985)

Personal information
- Nationality: Chinese
- Born: 16 September 1985 (age 41) Jinan, Shandong, PR China
- Height: 196 cm (77 in)

Sport
- Sport: Handball
- Position: Left Wing
National team
- Years: Team
- –: PR China

Li Hexin (born 16 September 1985) is a Chinese handball player who competed in the 2008 Summer Olympics.
