= Li Wenjuan =

Chinese cyclist

Personal information
- Full name: Li Wenjuan
- Born: 6 February 1994 (age 32)

Cycling career
- Sport: Cycling
- Current team: Retired
- Discipline: Road
- Role: Rider

Professional team
- 2015: China Chongming–Liv–Champion System

Li Wenjuan (Chinese: 李文娟, born 6 February 1994) is a Chinese former professional racing cyclist. She competed at the 2014 Asian Games and won the silver medal in the time trial, and finished fourth in the time trial at the 2015 Asian Cycling Championships.

== See also ==
- List of 2015 UCI Women's Teams and riders
