= Lei Sun =

Chinese and Canadian statistical geneticist

Lei Sun is a Chinese and Canadian statistical geneticist at the University of Toronto, where she is affiliated both with the department of biostatistics in the Dalla Lana School of Public Health and the department of statistical sciences in the faculty of arts and science.

== Education and career ==
Sun graduated in 1995 from Fudan University with a bachelor's degree in mathematics. She completed her Ph.D. in statistics in 2001 at the University of Chicago. Her dissertation, Two Statistical Problems in Human Genetics, was supervised by Mary Sara McPeek.

She joined the Dalla Lana School of Public Health in 2001, and at the same time took a courtesy appointment in statistical sciences. On becoming a full professor in 2014, she changed her appointment to be 25% time in the School of Public Health and 75% time in statistical sciences.

== Recognition ==
Sun was the 2017 winner of the CRM-SSC Prize in Statistics "for original and influential contributions to statistical methodology, statistical genetics, and human genetics, including important new developments in false discovery rate control and in robust methods for genetic association studies, and for her outstanding contributions to mentoring and training in statistical genetics in Canada".
