= Gymnastics at the 2014 Asian Games – Women's balance beam =

Women's balance beam at the 2014 Asian Games
- Venue: Namdong Gymnasium
- Date: 22–25 September 2014
- Competitors: 49 from 14 nations

Medalists
gold medal	Kim Un-hyang	North Korea
silver medal	Phan Thị Hà Thanh	Vietnam
bronze medal	Shang Chunsong	China

The women's balance beam competition at the 2014 Asian Games in Incheon, South Korea was held on 22 and 25 September 2014 at the Namdong Gymnasium.

== Schedule ==
All times are Korea Standard Time (UTC+09:00)

Date	Time	Event
Monday, 22 September 2014	11:00	Qualification
Thursday, 25 September 2014	19:00	Final

== Results ==
=== Qualification ===
Rank	Athlete	Score
1	Shang Chunsong (CHN)	14.900
2	Bai Yawen (CHN)	14.350
3	Yao Jinnan (CHN)	14.250
3	Kim Un-hyang (PRK)	14.250
5	Azumi Ishikura (JPN)	14.000
6	Kim So-yong (PRK)	13.850
7	Phan Thị Hà Thanh (VIE)	13.800
8	Joey Tam (SIN)	13.550
9	Chen Siyi (CHN)	13.550
10	Minami Honda (JPN)	13.450
11	Huang Huidan (CHN)	13.450
12	Aida Bauyrzhanova (KAZ)	13.000
13	Farah Ann Abdul Hadi (MAS)	13.000
14	Dilnoza Abdusalimova (UZB)	13.000
15	Yun Na-rae (KOR)	13.000
16	Kang Yong-mi (PRK)	12.950
17	Eum Da-yeon (KOR)	12.825
18	Sakura Yumoto (JPN)	12.750
19	Yuriko Yamamoto (JPN)	12.700
20	Dipa Karmakar (IND)	12.600
21	Lim Heem Wei (SIN)	12.550
22	Arailym Darmenova (KAZ)	12.350
23	Zhanerke Duisek (KAZ)	12.350
24	Akiho Sato (JPN)	12.300
25	Park Ji-soo (KOR)	12.250
26	Ri Un-ha (PRK)	12.150
27	Asal Saparbaeva (UZB)	12.100
28	Đỗ Thị Vân Anh (VIE)	12.050
29	Chen Feng-chih (TPE)	12.000
30	Đỗ Thị Thu Huyền (VIE)	11.850
31	Angel Wong (HKG)	11.850
32	Hong Un-jong (PRK)	11.800
33	Jeong Hee-yeon (KOR)	11.750
34	Lo Yu-ju (TPE)	11.700
35	Elena Rega (UZB)	11.700
36	Praewpraw Doungchan (THA)	11.650
37	Pranati Das (IND)	11.250
38	Fan Chieh-ting (TPE)	11.100
39	Wu Jhih-han (TPE)	10.950
40	Pranati Nayak (IND)	10.950
41	Anna Geidt (KAZ)	10.950
42	Khilola Doniyorova (UZB)	10.850
43	Kim Chae-yeon (KOR)	10.700
44	Aruna Reddy (IND)	10.600
45	Rucha Divekar (IND)	10.150
46	Yekaterina Chuikina (KAZ)	10.050
47	Baatarjavyn Ichinkhorloo (MGL)	10.050
48	Batbaataryn Soyolsaikhan (MGL)	8.475
49	Lin Tseng-nung (TPE)	8.250

=== Final ===
Rank	Athlete	Score
1st place, gold medalist(s)	Kim Un-hyang (PRK)	14.700
2nd place, silver medalist(s)	Phan Thị Hà Thanh (VIE)	14.433
3rd place, bronze medalist(s)	Shang Chunsong (CHN)	14.300
4	Azumi Ishikura (JPN)	13.933
5	Kim So-yong (PRK)	13.666
6	Joey Tam (SIN)	13.500
7	Bai Yawen (CHN)	13.366
8	Minami Honda (JPN)	12.866
