= India at the 2014 Asian Games =

- IOC code: IND
- NOC: Indian Olympic Association

in Incheon
- Competitors: 541 in 28 sports
- Flag bearers: Opening: Sardar Singh; Closing:
- Medals Ranked 8th: Gold 11 Silver 9 Bronze 37 Total 57

Asian Games appearances (overview)
- 1951; 1954; 1958; 1962; 1966; 1970; 1974; 1978; 1982; 1986; 1990; 1994; 1998; 2002; 2006; 2010; 2014; 2018; 2022; 2026

India competed at the 2014 Asian Games in Incheon, South Korea, from 19 September to 4 October 2014. After 16 years India won the gold medal in Asian Games men's hockey tournament, and consequently earned a direct berth to the 2016 Summer Olympics hockey tournament.

== Medal table ==
Sport	Gold	Silver	Bronze	Total
Athletics	2	3	8	13
Kabaddi	2	0	0	2
Squash	1	2	1	4
Shooting	1	1	7	9
Tennis	1	1	3	5
Wrestling	1	1	3	5
Archery	1	1	2	4
Boxing	1	0	4	5
Hockey	1	0	1	2
Rowing	0	0	3	3
Wushu	0	0	2	2
Badminton	0	0	1	1
Sailing	0	0	1	1
Swimming	0	0	1	1
Total	11	9	37	57

=== Medals by day ===
Medals by day
Day	Date	Gold	Silver	Bronze	Total
1	20 September	1	0	1	2
2	21 September	0	0	2	2
3	22 September	0	0	2	2
4	23 September	0	1	4	5
5	24 September	0	0	1	1
6	25 September	0	0	3	3
7	26 September	0	1	1	2
8	27 September	2	2	6	10
9	28 September	1	1	6	8
10	29 September	2	2	3	7
11	30 September	0	1	3	4
12	1 October	1	1	2	4
13	2 October	2	0	3	5
14	3 October	2	0	0	2
15	4 October	0	0	0	0
	Total	11	9	37	57

== Medalists ==
Medal	Name	Sport	Event	Date
Gold	Jitu Rai	Shooting	Men's 50 metre pistol	20 September
Gold	Rajat Chauhan; Sandeep Kumar; Abhishek Verma	Archery	Men's team compound	27 September
Gold	Saurav Ghosal; Mahesh Mangaonkar; Harinder Pal Sandhu; Kush Kumar	Squash	Men's team	27 September
Gold	Yogeshwar Dutt	Wrestling	Men's freestyle 65 kg	28 September
Gold	Seema Punia	Athletics	Women's discus throw	29 September
Gold	Sania Mirza; Saketh Myneni	Tennis	Mixed doubles	29 September
Gold	Mary Kom	Boxing	Women's 51 kg	1 October
Gold	Men's hockey team	Field hockey	Men	2 October
Gold	Priyanka Pawar; Tintu Luka; Mandeep Kaur; M. R. Poovamma	Athletics	Women's 4 × 400 metres relay	2 October
Gold	Women's kabaddi team	Kabaddi	Women	3 October
Gold	Men's kabaddi team	Kabaddi	Men	3 October
Silver	Saurav Ghosal	Squash	Men's singles	23 September
Silver	Pemba Tamang; Vijay Kumar; Gurpreet Singh	Shooting	Men's 25 metre center fire pistol team	26 September
Silver	Dipika Pallikal; Joshna Chinappa; Anaka Alankamony	Squash	Women's team	27 September
Silver	Abhishek Verma	Archery	Men's individual compound	27 September
Silver	Khushbir Kaur	Athletics	Women's 20 kilometres walk	28 September
Silver	Sanam Singh; Saketh Myneni	Tennis	Men's doubles	29 September
Silver	Bajrang Kumar	Wrestling	Men's freestyle 61 kg	29 September
Silver	Vikas Gowda	Athletics	Men's discus throw	30 September
Silver	Tintu Luka	Athletics	Women's 800 metres	1 October
Bronze	Shweta Chaudhary	Shooting	Women's 10 metre air pistol	20 September
Bronze	Jitu Rai; Samaresh Jung; Prakash Nanjappa	Shooting	Men's 10 metre air pistol team	21 September
Bronze	Saina Nehwal; P. V. Sindhu; P. C. Thulasi; Pradnya Gadre; N. Siki Reddy; Ashwini Ponnappa	Badminton	Women's team	21 September
Bronze	Rahi Sarnobat; Anisa Sayyed; Heena Sidhu	Shooting	Women's 25 metre pistol team	22 September
Bronze	Dipika Pallikal	Squash	Women's singles	22 September
Bronze	Abhinav Bindra; Ravi Kumar; Sanjeev Rajput	Shooting	Men's 10 metre air rifle team	23 September
Bronze	Abhinav Bindra	Shooting	Men's 10 metre air rifle	23 September
Bronze	Sanathoi Devi Yumnam	Wushu	Women's sanda 52 kg	23 September
Bronze	Narender Grewal	Wushu	Men's sanda 60 kg	23 September
Bronze	Dushyant Chauhan	Rowing	Men's lightweight single sculls	24 September
Bronze	Sawarn Singh	Rowing	Men's single sculls	25 September
Bronze	Kapil Sharma; Ranjit Singh; Bajrang Lal Takhar; Robin Panachithanathu Ulahannan; Sawan Kumar Kalkal; Mohammad Azad; Maninder Singh; Davinder Singh; Mohammed Ahmed	Rowing	Men's eight	25 September
Bronze	Shagun Chowdhary; Shreyasi Singh; Varsha Varman	Shooting	Women's double trap team	25 September
Bronze	Sandeep Sejwal	Swimming	Men's 50 metre breaststroke	26 September
Bronze	Trisha Deb; Purvasha Shende; Jyothi Surekha Vennam	Archery	Women's team compound	27 September
Bronze	Chain Singh	Shooting	Men's 50 metre rifle three positions	27 September
Bronze	Trisha Deb	Archery	Women's individual compound	27 September
Bronze	Vinesh Phogat	Wrestling	Women's freestyle 48 kg	27 September
Bronze	Geetika Jakhar	Wrestling	Women's freestyle 63 kg	27 September
Bronze	Lalita Babar	Athletics	Women's 3000 metres steeplechase	27 September
Bronze	Manju Bala	Athletics	Women's hammer throw	28 September
Bronze	Yuki Bhambri	Tennis	Men's singles	28 September
Bronze	Yuki Bhambri; Divij Sharan	Tennis	Men's doubles	28 September
Bronze	Sania Mirza; Prarthana Thombare	Tennis	Women's doubles	28 September
Bronze	M. R. Poovamma	Athletics	Women's 400 metres	28 September
Bronze	Rajiv Arokia	Athletics	Men's 400 metres	28 September
Bronze	O. P. Jaisha	Athletics	Women's 1500 metres	29 September
Bronze	Narsingh Pancham Yadav	Wrestling	Men's freestyle 74 kg	29 September
Bronze	Naveen Kumar	Athletics	Men's 3000 metres steeplechase	29 September
Bronze	Laishram Sarita Devi	Boxing	Women's 60 kg	30 September
Bronze	Pooja Rani	Boxing	Women's 75 kg	30 September
Bronze	Varsha Gautham; Aishwarya Nedunchezhiyan	Sailing	Women's 29er	30 September
Bronze	Women's hockey team	Field hockey	Women	1 October
Bronze	Annu Rani	Athletics	Women's javelin throw	1 October
Bronze	Satish Kumar	Boxing	Men's +91 kg	2 October
Bronze	Vikas Krishan Yadav	Boxing	Men's 75 kg	2 October
Bronze	Inderjeet Singh	Athletics	Men's shot put	2 October

== Archery ==
=== Men ===
Recurve

Athlete	Event	Ranking round		Round of 64	Round of 32	Round of 16	Quarterfinals	Semifinals	Final / BM	Rank
Athlete	Event	Score	Seed	Opposition Score	Opposition Score	Opposition Score	Opposition Score	Opposition Score	Opposition Score	Rank
Rahul Banerjee	Individual	1296	25	did not advance						
Tarundeep Rai	Individual	1300	22	did not advance						
Atanu Das	Individual	1316	13	Bye	Nay M A (MYA); W 6–0	Chen H-f (TPE); W 6–2	Oh J-h (KOR); L 0–6	did not advance		
Jayanta Talukdar	Individual	1307	17	Bye	Thamwong (THA); W 6–0	Anuar (MAS); L 1–7	did not advance			
Atanu Das; Mangal Singh Champia; Jayanta Talukdar	Team	3923	6	—N/a		Hong Kong (HKG); L 3–5	did not advance			

Compound

Athlete	Event	Ranking round		Round of 64	Round of 32	Round of 16	Quarterfinals	Semifinals	Final / BM	Rank
Athlete	Event	Score	Seed	Opposition Score	Opposition Score	Opposition Score	Opposition Score	Opposition Score	Opposition Score	Rank
Abhishek Verma	Individual	698	9	Bye	Purevdorj (MGL); W 146–144	Nguyễn T C (VIE); W 148–143	Choi Y-h (KOR); W 147–142	Mahazan (MAS); W 143–135	Ebadi (IRI); L 143–146	2nd place, silver medalist(s)
Sandeep Kumar	Individual	700	6	Bye	Tsui W H (HKG); W 144–135	Kung L-h (TPE); W 148–143	De la Cruz (PHI); L 135–141	did not advance		
Rajat Chauhan	Individual	697	10	did not advance						
Govinda Singh Thokchom	Individual	691	14	did not advance						
Abhishek Verma; Rajat Chauhan; Sandeep Kumar	Team	2095	3	—N/a		Qatar (QAT); W 233–218	Malaysia (MAS); W 234–229	Iran (IRI); W 231–227	South Korea (KOR); W 227–225	1st place, gold medalist(s)

=== Women ===
Recurve

Athlete	Event	Ranking round		Round of 64	Round of 32	Round of 16	Quarterfinals	Semifinals	Final / BM	Rank
Athlete	Event	Score	Seed	Opposition Score	Opposition Score	Opposition Score	Opposition Score	Opposition Score	Opposition Score	Rank
Deepika Kumari	Individual	1337	8	Bye	Nurmanova (UZB); W 6–0	Choirunisa (INA); L 0–6	did not advance			
Bombayla Devi Laishram	Individual	1301	20	did not advance						
Laxmirani Majhi	Individual	1319	15	Bye	Sharbekova (KGZ); W 6–0	Yuan S-c (TPE); W 6–4	Chang H-j (KOR); L 6–2	did not advance		
Pranitha Vardhineni	Individual	1271	30	did not advance						
Deepika Kumari; Bombayla Devi Laishram; Laxmirani Majhi	Team	3957	5	—N/a		Uzbekistan (UZB); W 6–0	Chinese Taipei (TPE); W 5–4	South Korea (KOR); L 0–6	Japan (JPN); L 4–5	4

Compound

Athlete	Event	Ranking round		Round of 32	Round of 16	Quarterfinals	Semifinals	Final / BM	Rank
Athlete	Event	Score	Seed	Opposition Score	Opposition Score	Opposition Score	Opposition Score	Opposition Score	Rank
Purvasha Sudhir Shende	Individual	680	11	Erdenechimeg (MGL); W 132–117	Chen L-j (TPE); W 139–139 (9–8 S-off)	Seok J-h (KOR); L 140–143	did not advance		
Jyothi Surekha Vennam	Individual	680	12	did not advance					
Lily Chanu Paonam	Individual	677	15	did not advance					
Trisha Deb	Individual	687	4	Bye	Honda (JPN); W 146–140	Sharlak (IRI); W 142–131	Seok J-h (KOR); L 140–145	Huang I-j (TPE); W 138–134	3rd place, bronze medalist(s)
Purvasha Sudhir Shende; Trisha Deb; Jyothi Surekha Vennam	Team	2047	2	—N/a	Bye	Kazakhstan (KAZ); W 223–223 (29–25 S-off)	Chinese Taipei (TPE); L 224–226	Iran (IRI); W 224–217	3rd place, bronze medalist(s)

== Athletics ==
=== Men ===
Track & road events

Athletes	Event	Heats		Semifinal		Final	
Athletes	Event	Result	Rank	Result	Rank	Result	Rank
Kunhu Mohammed	400 m	46.55	3 Q	46.08 PB	4 q	46.53	7
Arokia Rajiv	400 m	46.41	1 Q	46.22	3 Q	45.92 PB	3rd place, bronze medalist(s)
Sajeesh Joseph	800 m	1:49.90	3 q	—N/a		1:49.59	4
Kheta Ram	5000 m	—N/a				13:37.40 PB	7
Suresh Kumar Patel	5000 m	—N/a				13:42.28 PB	9
Suresh Kumar Patel	10000 m	—N/a				28:58.22 PB	6
Rahul Kumar Pal	10000 m	—N/a				28:52.36 PB	5
Naveen Kumar	3000m Steeplechase	—N/a				8:40.39	3rd place, bronze medalist(s)
Siddhanth Thingalaya	110m Hurdle	13.74	5 q	—N/a		13.73	6
Jithin Paul	400m Hurdle	51.76	2 Q	—N/a		DQ	
Joseph Abraham	400m Hurdle	51.04	3	—N/a		did not advance	
Jithin Paul; Joseph Abraham; Kunhu Mohammed; Arokia Rajiv	4 × 400 m relay	3:05.60 SB	2 Q	—N/a		3:04.61 SB	4
Irfan Kolothum Thodi	20 km Walk	—N/a				1:23:18	5
K Ganapathy	20 km Walk	—N/a				DSQ	
Sandeep Kumar	50 km Walk	—N/a				3:59:31	4
Basant Bahadur Rana	50 km Walk	—N/a				4:07:06	5

Field events

Athletes	Event	Final	
Athletes	Event	Result	Rank
Vikas Gowda	Discus Throw	62.58	2nd place, silver medalist(s)
Inderjeet Singh	Shot Put	19.63	3rd place, bronze medalist(s)
Om Prakash Karhana	Shot Put	16.94	9
Nikhil Chittarasu	High Jump	2.15	16
Arpinder Singh	Triple Jump	16.41	5
Renjith Maheswary	Triple Jump	15.67	9
Chandrodaya Narayan Singh	Hammer Throw	66.98	8
Rajinder Singh	Javelin Throw	73.43	11

=== Women ===
Track & road events

Athletes	Event	Heats		Semifinal		Final	
Athletes	Event	Result	Rank	Result	Rank	Result	Rank
Sharadha Narayanan	100 m	12.04	5	did not advance			
Asha Roy	200 m	13.96	3	did not advance			
Mandeep Kaur	400 m	53.06	2 Q	—N/a		53.38	6
M. R. Poovamma	400 m	52.17	1 Q	—N/a		52.36	3rd place, bronze medalist(s)
Tintu Luka	800 m	2.04.28	1 Q	—N/a		1.59.19 SB	2nd place, silver medalist(s)
Sushma Devi	800 m	2:03.54	3 Q	—N/a		2.01.92 PB	4
Sinimole Paulose	1500 m	—N/a				4:17.12	5
O. P. Jaisha	1500 m	—N/a				4:13.46	3rd place, bronze medalist(s)
O. P. Jaisha	5000 m	—N/a				15:18.30 PB	4
Preeja Sreedharan	5000 m	—N/a				15:39.52	8 SB
Preeja Sreedharan	10000 m	—N/a				32:29.17	7
Lalita Babar	3000m Steeplechase	—N/a				9:35.37 NR	3rd place, bronze medalist(s)
Sudha Singh	3000m Steeplechase	—N/a				9:35.64 PB	4
Ashwini Akkunji	400m Hurdle	57.67	2 Q	—N/a		57.52	4
Sarbani Nanda; Asha Roy; Sharadha Narayana; H M Jyothi	4 × 100 m Relay	—N/a				44.91	6
M. R. Poovamma; Priyanka Pawar; Tintu Lukka; Mandeep Kaur	4 × 400 m Relay	—N/a				3:28.68 GR	1st place, gold medalist(s)
Khushbir Kaur	20 km Walk	—N/a				1:33:07	2nd place, silver medalist(s)

Field events

Athletes	Event	Final	
Athletes	Event	Result	Rank
Seema Punia	Discus Throw	61.03	1st place, gold medalist(s)
Krishna Poonia	Discus Throw	55.57	4
Manju Bala	Hammer Throw	60.47	3rd place, bronze medalist(s)
Annu Rani	Javelin Throw	59.53 PB	3rd place, bronze medalist(s)
Sahana Kumari	High Jump	1.80	8
M. A. Prajusha	Long Jump	6.23	8
Mayookha Johny	Long Jump	6.12	9
M. A. Prajusha	Triple Jump	NM	
Mayookha Johny	Triple Jump	13.50	9

Combined events – Heptathlon

Athlete	Event	100H	HJ	SP	200 m	LJ	JT	800 m	Total	Rank
Sushmita Singha Roy	Result	14.67	1.71	11.16	25.77	5.24	36.91	2:22.97	5194	4
Sushmita Singha Roy	Points	886	867	606	817	626	608	784	5194	4
Swapna Barman	Result	14.83	1.74	10.40	26.42	5.55	39.75	2:28.13	5178	5
Swapna Barman	Points	864	903	556	761	715	662	717	5178	5

== Badminton ==
Singles

Athlete	Event	Round of 64	Round of 32	Round of 16	Quarterfinal	Semifinal	Final	Rank
Athlete	Event	Opposition Result	Opposition Result	Opposition Result	Opposition Result	Opposition Result	Opposition Result	Rank
Parupalli Kashyap	Men	Bye	Iqbal (AFG); W (21–6, 21–6)	Lee C W (MAS); L (12–21, 11–21)	did not advance			
Srikanth Kidambi	Men	Bye	Phạm C C (VIE); W (23–21, 21–8)	Shon W-h (KOR); L (21–19, 11–21, 18–21)	did not advance			
Saina Nehwal	Women	—N/a	Teng L U (MAC); W (21–10, 21–8)	Aghaei (IRI); W (21–7, 21–6)	Wang Yh (CHN); L (21–18, 9–21, 7–21)	did not advance		
P. V. Sindhu	Women	—N/a	Kit L W (MAC); W (21–7, 21–13)	Manuputty (INA); L (22–20, 16–21, 20–22)	did not advance			

Doubles

Athlete	Event	Round of 32	Round of 16	Quarterfinal	Semifinal	Final	Rank
Athlete	Event	Opposition Result	Opposition Result	Opposition Result	Opposition Result	Opposition Result	Rank
Manu Attri; B. Sumeeth Reddy	Men	Sharafuddeen / Sarim (MDV); W (21–7, 21–7)	Liu Xl / Qiu Zh (CHN); W (21–17, 21–16)	Ahsan / Setiawan (INA); L (12–21, 19–21)	did not advance		
Pranav Chopra; Akshay Dewalkar	Men	Cai Y / Fu Hf (CHN); L (10–21, 15–21)	did not advance				
N. Siki Reddy; Pradnya Gadre	Women	Shrestha / Gurung (NEP); W (21–6, 21–4)	Maeda / Kakiiwa (JPN); L (16–21, 21–19, 14–21)	did not advance			
N. Siki Reddy; Manu Attri	Mixed	Rasheed / Sharafuddeen (MDV); W (21–8, 21–4)	Neo / Chrisnanta (INA); L (18–21, 23–21, 15–21)	did not advance			
Pradnya Gadre; Akshay Dewalkar	Mixed	Yao L / Triyachart (SIN); L (20–22, 21–17, 13–21)	did not advance				

Team

Athlete	Event	Round of 16	Quarterfinals	Semifinals	Final	Rank
Athlete	Event	Opposition Result	Opposition Result	Opposition Result	Opposition Result	Rank
Srikanth Kidambi; Gurusai Datt; Parupalli Kashyap; Manu Attri; B. Sumeeth Reddy; Pranav Chopra; Akshay Dewalkar	Men	South Korea (KOR); L 0–3	did not advance			
Saina Nehwal; P. V. Sindhu; P. C. Thulasi; N. Siki Reddy; Pradnya Gadre; Ashwini Ponnappa	Women	Macau (MAC); W 3–0	Thailand (THA); W 3–2	South Korea (KOR); L 1–3	did not advance	3rd place, bronze medalist(s)

== Basketball ==
=== Men ===
- Joginder Singh
- Narender Kumar Grewal
- Akilan Pari
- Prakash Mishra
- Pratham Singh
- Vishesh Bhriguvanshi
- Amrit Pal Singh
- Prasanna Venkatesh
- Pal Preet Singh Brar
- Amjyot Singh
- Yadwinder Singh
- Rikin Pethani

==== Qualifying round ====
Group B

Team	Pld	W	L	PF	PA	PD	Pts
India	3	2	1	236	183	+53	5
Kazakhstan	3	2	1	222	189	+33	5
Saudi Arabia	3	2	1	221	227	−6	5
Palestine	3	0	3	180	250	−70	3

20 September
16:15

Palestine	49–89	India
Scoring by quarter: 6-20, 23-40, 41-68, 49-89

Hwaseong Sports Complex, Hwaseong

21 September
16:15

India	67–73	Saudi Arabia
Scoring by quarter: 13-19, 27-40, 46-59, 67-73

Hwaseong Sports Complex, Hwaseong

22 September
16:15

Kazakhstan	61–80	India
Scoring by quarter: 14-24, 31-47, 50-69, 61-80

Hwaseong Sports Complex, Hwaseong

==== Preliminary round ====
Group E

Team	Pld	W	L	PF	PA	PD	Pts
Iran	2	2	0	144	104	+40	4
Philippines	2	1	1	148	144	+4	3
India	2	0	2	117	161	−44	2

23 September
14:00

Philippines	85–76	India
Scoring by quarter: 24-16, 50-37, 70-56, 85-76

Hwaseong Sports Complex, Hwaseong

24 September
14:00

India	41–76	Iran
Scoring by quarter: 16-22, 28-38, 36-58, 41-76

Samsan World Gymnasium, Incheon

=== Women ===
- Akanksha Singh
- Rajapriyadharshini Rajaganapathi
- Raspreet Sidhu
- Smruthi Radhakrishnan
- Kavita Akula
- Stephy Nixon
- Poojamol Kochuparambu Subhashmon
- Shireen Vijay Limaye
- Jeena Skaria
- Kavita Kumari
- Prashanti Singh
- Kruthika Lakshman

==== Quarterfinal ====
28 September
13:00

India	37–70	Japan
Scoring by quarter: 5-15, 18-36, 27-58, 37-70

Hwaseong Sports Complex, Hwaseong

==== 5-8 Placement round ====
29 September
14:00

India	68–50	Mongolia
Scoring by quarter: 19-14, 33-23, 55-38, 37-70

Hwaseong Sports Complex, Hwaseong

==== 5/6 Placement round ====
1 October
13:00

India	47–68	Kazakhstan
Scoring by quarter: 12-15, 22-36, 26-55, 47-68

Hwaseong Sports Complex, Hwaseong

== Boxing ==
Men

Athlete	Event	Round of 32	Round of 16	Quarterfinals	Semifinals	Final	Rank
Athlete	Event	Opposition Result	Opposition Result	Opposition Result	Opposition Result	Opposition Result	Rank
Devendro Singh	49 kg	Albathali (KUW); W w/o	Lasavongsy (LAO); W TKO	Shin J-h (KOR); L 0–3	did not advance		
Gaurav Bidhuri	52 kg	Bye	Chaudhary (NEP); W 3–0	Zoirov (UZB); L 0–3	did not advance		
Shiva Thapa	56 kg	Parada (TLS); W w/o	Baloch (PAK); W TKOI	Fernandez (PHI); L 0–3	did not advance		
Akhil Kumar	60 kg	Lama (NEP); W TKO	Suarez (PHI); L 1–2	did not advance			
Manoj Kumar	64 kg	Kawachi (JPN); L 0–2	did not advance				
Mandeep Jangra	69 kg	Bye	Liu W (CHN); W 2–1	Saensit (THA); L 0–3	did not advance		
Vikas Krishan Yadav	75 kg	Bye	Kanybek Uulu (KGZ); W 3–0	Normatov (UZB); W 3–0	Alimkhanuly (KAZ); L 1–2	did not advance	3rd place, bronze medalist(s)
Kuldeep Singh	81 kg	—N/a	Thongkrathok (THA); W 2–1	Rouzbahani (IRI); L 0–3	did not advance		
Amritpreet Singh	91 kg	—N/a	Park N-h (KOR); L 1–2	did not advance			
Satish Kumar	+91 kg	—N/a	Bye	Ishaish (JOR); W 2–1	Dychko (KAZ); L 0–3	did not advance	3rd place, bronze medalist(s)

Women

Athlete	Event	Round of 16	Quarterfinals	Semifinals	Final	Rank
Athlete	Event	Opposition Result	Opposition Result	Opposition Result	Opposition Result	Rank
Mary Kom	51 kg	Kim Y-j (KOR); W 3–0	Si Hj (CHN); W 3–0	Lê T B (VIE); W 3–0	Shekerbekova (KAZ); W 2–0	1st place, gold medalist(s)
Laishram Sarita Devi	60 kg	Ri C-s (PRK); W 3–0	Oyungerel (MGL); W 3–0	Park J-a (KOR); L 0–3	did not advance	3rd place, bronze medalist(s)
Pooja Rani	75 kg	Erdenesoyol (MGL); W 3–0	Shen (TPE); W 3–0	Li Q (CHN); L 0–2	did not advance	3rd place, bronze medalist(s)

== Canoeing ==
=== Men ===
Sprint

Athlete	Event	Heat		Semifinal		Final	
Athlete	Event	Time	Rank	Time	Rank	Time	Rank
Jamesboy Oinam	C-1 200m	42.135	5 SF	42.996	3 F	43.981	9
Gaurav Tomar	C-1 1000m	4:23.554	4 SF	4:18.953	1 F	4:17.389	7
Ajit Kumar Sha; Raju Rawat	C-2 1000m	4:02.902	4 SF	4:02.971	2 F	4:00.800	5
Ramesh Golli	K-1 200m	37.827	6 SF	40.324	6	did not advance	
Albert Raj Selvaraj	K-1 1000m	4:09.231	6 SF	3:58.234	3 F	3:59.933	8
Sunny Kumar; Chingching Arambam	K-2 200m	34.863	6 SF	37.826	7	did not advance	
Sunny Kumar; Chingching Arambam	K-2 1000m	3:29.237	5 SF	3:37.915	4	did not advance	
Ajit Singh; Sunny Kumar; Ramesh Golli; Chingching Arambam	K-4 1000m	3:21.136	6 SF	3:14.908	3 F	3:15.291	8

Qualification Legend: 1/3 to Final, 4/7 + next BT to SF, Rest out

Obstacle Slalom

Athlete	Event	Qualification		Repechage		Round of 16		Quarterfinal	Semifinal	Final / BM
Athlete	Event	Time	Rank	Time	Rank	Time	Rank	Opposition Score	Opposition Score	Opposition Score
Prince Parmar	C-1	1:22.58	15	—N/a		1:28.80	14	did not advance		
Kuldeep Singh Keer	K-1	DNF		did not advance						

=== Women ===
Sprint

Athlete	Event	Heat		Semifinal		Final	
Athlete	Event	Time	Rank	Time	Rank	Time	Rank
Anusha Biju	K-1 200m	46.782	6 SF	48.751	6	did not advance	
Anusha Biju	K-1 500m	2:12.412	5 SF	2:11.956	5	did not advance	
Ragina Kiro; Nanao Devi Ahongshangbam	K-2 500m	1:58.155	5 SF	1:52.975	3 F	1:55.351	9
Ragina Kiro; Nanao Devi Ahongshangbam; Biju Anusha; Soniya Devi Phairempam	K-4 500m	—N/a				1:52.022	7

Qualification Legend: 1/3 to Final, 4/7 + next BT to SF, Rest out

Obstacle Slalom

Athlete	Event	Qualification		Repechage		Round of 16		Quarterfinal	Semifinal	Final / BM
Athlete	Event	Time	Rank	Time	Rank	Time	Rank	Opposition Score	Opposition Score	Opposition Score
Namita Chandel	C-1	1:42.09	10	1:33.37	6	did not advance				
Ganeshvri Dhurwe	K-1	1:26.99	10	1:28.03	5	—N/a		did not advance		
Champa Mourya	K-1	1:31.89	13	1:29.39	7	—N/a		did not advance		

== Cycling ==
=== Men ===
Athlete	Event	Qualifying		Round of 32		Repechage Round of 32		Round of 16		Quarterfinal		Semifinal		Final	
Athlete	Event	Time	Rank	Time	Rank	Time	Rank	Time	Rank	Time	Rank	Time	Rank	Time	Rank
Amrit Singh	Sprint	11.091	14 Q	N/A	2	N/A	3	did not advance							
Amarjit Singh Negi	Sprint	10.917	13 Q	N/A	2	N/A	2	did not advance							

Athlete	Event	Round 1		Repechage Round 1		Round 2		Final	
Athlete	Event	Time	Rank	Time	Rank	Time	Rank	Time	Rank
Amrit Singh	Keirin	N/A	5	N/A	5	did not advance			
Amarjit Singh Negi	Keirin	N/A	4	N/A	5	did not advance			

=== Women ===
Athlete	Event	Heats		Final	
Athlete	Event	Time	Rank	Time	Rank
Deborah	Keirin	N/A	5	N/A	9
Mohan Mahitha	Keirin	N/A	4	N/A	11

Athlete	Event	Qualifying		Quarterfinal		Semifinal		Final	
Athlete	Event	Time	Rank	Time	Rank	Time	Rank	Time	Rank
Deborah	Sprint	12.118	9	did not advance					
Kezia Vargheese	Sprint	12.897	10	did not advance					

== Equestrian ==
Eventing

Athlete	Horse	Event	Dressage		Cross country		Jumping final	
Athlete	Horse	Event	Overall	Rank	Overall	Rank	Overall	Rank
Sangram Singh	Ramases	Individual	61.20	24	110.80	24	118.80	22
Fouaad Mirza	Penultimate Vision	Individual	45.20	8	48.80	9	52.80	10
Mrityunjay Rathore	Fleece Clover	Individual	53.70	21	86.10	21	86.10	20
Ajai Appachu	Cocky Locky	Individual	45.60	9	45.60	6	49.60	8
Sangram Singh (equestrian); Fouaad Mirza; Mrityunjay Rathore; Ajai Appachu	As above	Team	144.50	4	180.50	5	188.50	5

Show Jumping

Athlete	Horse	Event	Round 1		Round 2		Final A		Final B	
Athlete	Horse	Event	Overall	Rank	Overall	Rank	Overall	Rank	Overall	Rank
Yashaan Khambatta	Olgy	Individual	9	32	29	35 Q	18	28	did not advance	
Sehaj Singh Virk	Laila Lordanos	Individual	EL		did not advance					
Ashray Butta	Allegro	Individual	DNS		did not advance					
Yashaan Khambatta; Sehaj Singh Virk; Ashray Butta	As above	Team	EL		did not advance					

Dressage

Athlete	Horse	Event	Prix		Intermediate		Freestyle		Total	
Athlete	Horse	Event	Overall	Rank	Overall	Rank	Overall	Rank	Overall	Rank
Shruti Vora	Akira	Individual	66.184	19 Q	68.474	13 Q	69.375	8	137.849	9
Nadia Haridass	Toranto	Individual	67.395	12 Q	66.105	19 Q	60.350	15	126.455	15
Shubhsri Rajendra	Harry	Individual	61.895	27 Q	59.421	29	did not advance			
Vanita Malhotra	Cantaro	Individual	58.947	30 Q	56.211	30	did not advance			
Shruti Vora; Nadia Haridass; Shubhsri Rajendra; Vanita Malhotra	As above	Team	—N/a						65.158	6

== Field hockey ==
=== Men ===
- P. R. Shreejesh
- Gurbaj Singh
- Birendra Lakra
- Rupinder Pal Singh
- Kothajit Singh
- V. R. Raghunath
- Dharamvir Singh
- Sardar Singh
- Danish Mujtaba
- Chinglensana Singh Kangujam
- Manpreet Singh
- Ramandeep Singh
- Akashdeep Singh
- S. V. Sunil
- Gurwinder Singh Chandi
- Nikkin Thimmaiah

==== Preliminary ====
Group B

Rank	Team	Pld	W	D	L	GF	GA	GD	Pts
11	Pakistan	4	4	0	0	26	1	+25	12
9	India	4	3	0	1	18	2	+16	9
27	China	4	2	0	2	11	4	+7	6
22	Oman	4	1	0	3	3	21	-18	3
40	Sri Lanka	4	0	0	4	1	31	-30	0

September 21
17:00

India	8–0	Sri Lanka
Rupinder 12', 45', 46'; Ramandeep 28', 59'; Raghunath 13'; Singh 21'; Thimmaiah 6'	Report

Seonhak Hockey Stadium, Incheon

September 23
17:00

Oman	0–7	India
	Report	Rupinder 18', 19'; Raghunath 39', 60'; Akashdeep 33'; Ramandeep 54'; Danish Mujtaba 60'

Seonhak Hockey Stadium, Incheon

September 25
17:00

India	1–2	Pakistan
Thimmaiah 53'	Report	Bhutta 37'; Waqas 55'

Seonhak Hockey Stadium, Incheon

September 27
17:00

India	2–0	China
Raghunath 40'; Birendra Lakra 45'	Report

Seonhak Hockey Stadium, Incheon

==== Semifinal ====
September 30
16:30

South Korea	0–1	India
	Report	Akashdeep 44'

Seonhak Hockey Stadium, Incheon

==== Final ====
October 2
19:00

Gold India	1–1 Shootout: 4–2	Pakistan Silver
Kothajit 27'	Report	Rizwan 3'

Seonhak Hockey Stadium, Incheon

=== Women ===
- Savita
- Deep Grace Ekka
- Deepika
- Sunita Lakra
- Namita Toppo
- Jaspreet Kaur
- Sushila Chanu
- Monika
- Ritu Rani
- Lilima Minz
- Amandeep Kaur
- Chanchan Devi Thokchom
- Rani Rampal
- Poonam Rani
- Vandana Kataria
- Navjot Kaur

==== Preliminary ====
Group A

Rank	Team	Pld	W	D	L	GF	GA	GD	Pts
5	China	3	3	0	0	8	1	+7	9
13	India	3	2	0	1	10	3	+7	6
21	Malaysia	3	1	0	2	3	8	-5	3
53	Thailand	3	0	0	3	1	10	-9	0

September 22
17:00

India	3–0	Thailand
Poonam Rani 15'; Vandana Kataria 39'; Deepika 53'	Report

Seonhak Hockey Stadium, Incheon

September 24
17:00

India	1-2	China
Jaspreet Kaur 23'	Report	Meiyu Liang 19'; Yudiao Zhao 59'

Seonhak Hockey Stadium, Incheon

September 26
17:00

Malaysia	1–6	India
Binti 41'	Report	Rani 4' 20'; Jaspreet Kaur 9' 39'; Toppo 17'; Ritu Rani 41'; Kataria 50'

Seonhak Hockey Stadium, Incheon

==== Semifinal ====
September 29
19:00

South Korea	3–1	India
Kim Da-rae 3'; Han Hyelyoung 28'; Park Mi-hyun 42'	Report	Toppo 11'

Seonhak Hockey Stadium, Incheon

==== Bronze-medal match ====
October 1
16:30

Japan	1–2	India Bronze
Akane Shibata 41'	Report	Jaspreet Kaur 23'; Vandana Kataria 42'

Seonhak Hockey Stadium, Incheon

== Football ==
=== Men ===
- Amrinder Singh
- Ravi Kumar
- Pritam Kotal
- Keenan Almeida
- Joyner Lourenco
- Shankar Sampingiraj
- Sandesh Jhingan
- Narayan Das
- Pronay Halder
- Rowllin Borges
- Clifton Dias
- Alwyn George
- Lalrindika Ralte
- Francisco Fernandes
- Seminlen Doungel
- Sunil Chhetri
- Robin Singh
- Thongkhosiem Haokip
- Mandar Rao Desai

==== Preliminary ====
Group G

Pos	Team	Pld	W	D	L	GF	GA	GD	Pts
1	Jordan	2	2	0	0	3	0	+3	6
2	United Arab Emirates	2	1	0	1	5	1	+4	3
3	India	2	0	0	2	0	7	−7	0

Source: RSSSF
September 15, 2014
17:00

United Arab Emirates	5–0	India
Al-Katheeri 13', 15', 64'; Bandar Mohamed 19'; Jhingan 82' (o.g.)	Report

Hwaseong Stadium
Referee: Chaiya Mahapab (Thailand)

September 22, 2014
17:00

India	0–2	Jordan
	Report	Albashtawi 17'; Thalji 67'

Incheon Munhak Stadium
Referee: Ma Ning (China)

=== Women ===
- Okram Roshini Devi
- Aditi Chauhan
- Pushpa Tirkey
- Ashem Romi Devi
- Ashalata Devi
- Tuli Goon
- Radharani Devi
- Suprava Samal
- Umapati Devi
- Premi Devi
- Amoolya Kamal
- Mandakini Devi
- Oinam Bembem Devi
- Kamala Devi
- Sasmita Malik
- Prameshwori Devi
- Dangmei Grace
- Bala Devi

==== Preliminary ====
Group A

Pos	Team	Pld	W	D	L	GF	GA	GD	Pts
1	South Korea	3	3	0	0	28	0	+28	9
2	Thailand	3	2	0	1	20	5	+15	6
3	India	3	1	0	2	15	20	−5	3
4	Maldives	3	0	0	3	0	38	−38	0

Source: RSSSF
14 September
14:00

India	15–0	Maldives
Malik 5', 21', 26', 80', 88'; K. Devi 18', 23', 31', 45+2', 65'; N. Devi 20', 45+1'; L.A. Devi 53'; O.B. Devi 55'; I. Devi 90+4'	Report

Namdong Asiad Rugby Field, Incheon
Referee: Nami Imaizumi (Japan)

17 September
20:00

South Korea	10–0	India
Jeon Ga-eul 7', 40', 61' (pen.); Yoo Young-a 9', 45', 63', 65'; Park Hee-young 36'; Jung Seol-bin 49', 79'

Namdong Asiad Rugby Field, Incheon
Referee: Fusako Kajiyama (Japan)

21 September
17:00

Thailand	10–0	India
Romyen 8', 9', 16', 39'; Sungngoen 24' (pen.), 27', 28', 35'; Sornsai 47'; Seesraum 90+2'

Namdong Asiad Rugby Field, Incheon
Referee: Mai Hoàng Trang (Vietnam)

== Golf ==
Men

Athlete	Event	Round 1	Round 2	Round 3	Round 4	Total	Par	Rank
Udayan Mane	Individual	70	66	72	69	277	-11	T7
Manu Gandas	Individual	71	69	68	71	279	-9	11
Feroz Garewal	Individual	70	73	69	73	285	-3	T19
Samarth Dwivedi	Individual	71	73	75	71	290	+2	32
Udayan Mane; Manu Gandas; Feroz Garewal; Samarth Dwivedi	Team	211	208	209	211	839	-25	6

Women

Athlete	Event	Round 1	Round 2	Round 3	Round 4	Total	Par	Rank
Gurbani Singh	Individual	75	72	70	74	291	+2	15
Aditi Ashok	Individual	78	75	71	75	299	+3	21
Astha Madan	Individual	75	79	78	78	310	+6	24
Gurbani Singh; Aditi Ashok; Astha Madan	Team	150	147	141	149	587	+11	8

== Gymnastics ==
=== Men ===
Qualifying

Athlete	Event	F		PH		R		V		PB		HB		All Around	
Athlete	Event	Points	Rank	Points	Rank	Points	Rank	Points	Rank	Points	Rank	Points	Rank	Points	Rank
Ashish Kumar	Individual	14.450	14	12.300	44	13.200	39	13.925	19	13.400	42	12.550	32	80.250	18 Q
Rakesh Patra	Individual	12.400	55	11.500	49	14.350	21	—N/a		14.150	24	12.450	33	78.900	22
Chandan Pathak	Individual	13.600	35	11.950	48	12.450	52	—N/a				11.500	48	—N/a	
Aditya Singh Rana	Individual	12.900	51	12.150	47	11.350	56	14.125	15	12.700	49	12.450	35	75.675	30 Q
Bahadur Dhan	Individual	—N/a		14.025	15	—N/a				13.600	37	—N/a			
Abhijit Shinde	Individual	12.400	56	—N/a		13.150	40	—N/a		12.750	48	12.000	44	—N/a	
Ashish Kumar; Rakesh Patra; Chandan Pathak; Aditya Singh Rana; Bahadur Dhan; Abhijit Shinde	Team	53.425	8	50.425	9	53.150	9	55.200	11	53.900	9	49.550	9	315.650	10

Finals

Athlete	Event	F		PH		R		V		PB		HB		All Around	
Athlete	Event	Points	Rank	Points	Rank	Points	Rank	Points	Rank	Points	Rank	Points	Rank	Points	Rank
Ashish Kumar	Individual All Around	14.700	4	13.250	11	13.200	15	14.250	7	13.600	13	12.750	13	81.750	12
Aditya Singh Rana	Individual All Around	14.050	11	11.425	19	12.750	17	13.575	14	13.100	16	12.250	17	77.150	17

=== Women ===
Qualifying

Athlete	Event	V		UB		B		F		All Around	
Athlete	Event	Points	Rank	Points	Rank	Points	Rank	Points	Rank	Points	Rank
Dipa Karmakar	Individual	14.400	3 Q	10.150	32	12.600	20	11.150	41	47.850	23 Q
Pranati Nayak	Individual	—N/a		9.450	40	10.950	40	10.850	43	44.675	30 Q
Pranati Das	Individual	—N/a		8.650	43	11.250	37	10.750	44	43.700	31
Aruna Reddy	Individual	13.375	9	7.650	46	10.600	44	11.300	39	43.150	34
Payal Bhattacharjee	Individual	—N/a		7.900	45	—N/a					
Rucha Divekar	Individual	—N/a				10.150	45	10.200	48	—N/a	
Dipa Karmakar; Pranati Nayak; Pranati Das; Aruna Reddy; Payal Bhattacharjee; Rucha Divekar	Team	54.025	6	36.150	8	45.400	8	44.050	8	179.625	8

Finals

Athlete	Event	V		UB		B		F		All Around	
Athlete	Event	Points	Rank	Points	Rank	Points	Rank	Points	Rank	Points	Rank
Dipa Karmakar	Vault	14.200	4	—N/a							
Dipa Karmakar	Individual All Around	13.600	9	10.550	15	12.600	10	12.300	8	49.050	10
Pranati Nayak	Individual All Around	13.450	11	9.500	18	10.600	19	10.250	21	43.800	20

== Handball ==
=== Men ===
- Nitin Kumar Sharma
- Atul Kumar
- Sachin Kumar
- Lalit T Kumar
- Binu Vasu
- Greenidge Sing D Cun
- Satish Panwar
- Avin Khatkar Khelkar
- Manpret Singh Bassi
- Sunil
- Manish Kumar
- Mahesh Ugale
- Hardev Singh
- Firoz Ahmed Khan
- Rajvinder Kaur

==== Group D ====
Pos	Team	Pld	W	D	L	GF	GA	GD	Pts	Qualification
1	South Korea	3	3	0	0	97	57	+40	6	Main round
2	Chinese Taipei	3	2	0	1	84	75	+9	4	Main round
3	Japan	3	1	0	2	99	74	+25	2	Classification round 9–12
4	India	3	0	0	3	51	125	−74	0	Classification 13th–14th

Source: Results

September 20; 10:00	India	20 – 39	Chinese Taipei	Seonhak Handball Gymnasium, Incheon; Referees: Khalid Shakir Hussein, Fadhil Kadhim Imran (IRQ)
September 20; 10:00	Mahesh Ugale (5); Greenidge Sing D Cun (4); Avin Khatkar Khelkar (3); Manpret Singh Bassi (3); Binu Vasu (1); Neeraj Singh (1); Hardev Singh (1)	(11-24)	Yi Fan Chiu (9); Hsien Chang Chao (5); Cheng Hsien Wang (5); Hsin Wei Huang (4); Hui Hsiung Wan (4); Hsu Hung Cheng (3); Cheng Han Lee (3); Chia Wei Weng (2); Chun Fu Chen (2); Chih Jen Wang (1); Hsieng Min Hsu (1); Yi Chiao Chen (1)	Seonhak Handball Gymnasium, Incheon; Referees: Khalid Shakir Hussein, Fadhil Kadhim Imran (IRQ)
September 20; 10:00	3× (yellow card) 3× (suspension)	Report	3× (yellow card) 1× (suspension)	Seonhak Handball Gymnasium, Incheon; Referees: Khalid Shakir Hussein, Fadhil Kadhim Imran (IRQ)

September 21; 16:00	South Korea	39–19	India	Seonhak Handball Gymnasium, Incheon; Referees: Dan Mei, Jingyan Jin (CHN)
September 21; 16:00	Hyeonsik Lee (8); Sanguk Lee (7); Doyeop Hwang (5); Kyungsuk Park (4); Hyowon Eom (4); Donngeun Yu (3); Eunho Lee (3); Jaebok Sim (2); Yunsuk Oh (1); Ciyoel Yoon (1); Junggeu Park (1)	(21-6)	Satish Panwar (4); Lalit Kumar (3); Sunil Kumar (3); Hardev Singh (3); Manpreet Singh Bassi (2); Sachin Bharadwaj (1); Greenidge Sing D Cun (1); Avin Khatkar Khelkar (1); Binu Vasu (1)	Seonhak Handball Gymnasium, Incheon; Referees: Dan Mei, Jingyan Jin (CHN)
September 21; 16:00	3× (yellow card) 1× (suspension)	Report	3× (yellow card) 1× (suspension)	Seonhak Handball Gymnasium, Incheon; Referees: Dan Mei, Jingyan Jin (CHN)

September 22; 16:00	India	12 – 47	Japan	Seonhak Handball Gymnasium, Incheon; Referees: Eunha Lee, Gaeul Lee (KOR)
September 22; 16:00	Greenidge Sing D Cun (3); Manpreet Singh Bassi (2); Avin Khatkar Khelkar (2); Firoz Khan (1); Manish Kumr (1); Neeraj Singh (1); Binu Vasu (1); Sunil Kumar (1)	(6-21)	Daisuke Miyazaki (10); Izuru Ishakawa (7); Hiroki Motoki (5); Hiroki Shida (5); Kota Azawa (4); Kohei Narita (4); Hidenori Kishigawa (3); Yoshiaki Monura (3); Hideaki Chijiwa (2); Takahashi Kato (1); Daichi Komuro (1); Jun Mori (1); Kairi Kochi (1)	Seonhak Handball Gymnasium, Incheon; Referees: Eunha Lee, Gaeul Lee (KOR)
September 22; 16:00	1× (yellow card) 3× (suspension)	Report	3× (yellow card) 3× (suspension)	Seonhak Handball Gymnasium, Incheon; Referees: Eunha Lee, Gaeul Lee (KOR)

=== Women ===
- Tintu Abraham
- Anumit
- Deepa
- Indu Gupta
- Gurmail Kaur
- Gurpreet Kaur
- Maninder Kaur
- Manisha
- Varuni Negi
- Preeti
- Priyanka
- Rajwant Kaur
- Rimpi
- Ritu
- Sanjeeta
- Sonia

==== Group A ====
Pos	Team	Pld	W	D	L	GF	GA	GD	Pts	Qualification
1	South Korea	3	3	0	0	131	39	+92	6	Semifinals
2	China	3	2	0	1	99	68	+31	4	Semifinals
3	Thailand	3	0	1	2	53	113	−60	1 (Note: Head-to-head result: THA 26–26 IND. Overall goal difference was used as the tiebreaker.)	Classification 5–8
4	India	3	0	1	2	49	112	−63	1	Classification 5–8

Source: Results
Notes:

September 20; 16:00	India	11 – 47	South Korea	Suwon Gymnasium, Incheon; Referees: Mariko Shimarji, Tomoko Ota (JPN)
September 20; 16:00	Rajwant Kaur (6); Preeti (1); Ritu (1); Anumit (1); Deepa (1); Manisha (1)	(3-25)	Seonhwa Kim (8); Hanna Gwon (5); Eunbi Lee (5); Sumin Choi (5); Sunhee Woo (4); Ona Kim (4); Eunhee Ryu (4); Jihae Jung (3); Hyunji Yoo (2); Haein Sim (2); Yura Jung (2); Jinyi Kim (2); Seonpil Won (1)	Suwon Gymnasium, Incheon; Referees: Mariko Shimarji, Tomoko Ota (JPN)
September 20; 16:00	2× (yellow card) 7× (suspension)	Report	3× (yellow card)	Suwon Gymnasium, Incheon; Referees: Mariko Shimarji, Tomoko Ota (JPN)

September 21; 18:00	India	26 – 26	Thailand	Suwon Gymnasium, Incheon; Referees: Mariko Shimarji, Tomoko Ota (JPN)
September 21; 18:00	Manisha (8); Rajwant Kaur (7); Sanjeeta (7); Ritu (2); Maninder Kaur (2)	(10-15)	Wongduean Sawatporn (6); Katnarin Khaengrit (5); Thippawan Wongmak (4); Lamduan Maneesa (3); Pattarasiri Thanawat (2); Sunanta Hongbooddee (2); Chuenkamol Intong (2); Khuearat Kam Mor (1); Suphaporn Yaemyim (1)	Suwon Gymnasium, Incheon; Referees: Mariko Shimarji, Tomoko Ota (JPN)
September 21; 18:00	3× (yellow card) 5× (suspension)	Report	3× (yellow card) 6× (suspension)	Suwon Gymnasium, Incheon; Referees: Mariko Shimarji, Tomoko Ota (JPN)

September 22; 20:00	India	12 – 39	China	Suwon Gymnasium, Incheon; Referees: Khalid Shakir Hussein, Fadhil Kadhim Imran (IRQ)
September 22; 20:00	Maninder Kaur (4); Manisha (3); Sanjeeta (1); Rimpi (1); Ritu (1); Deepa (1); Rajwant Kaur (1)	(6-20)	Haixia Zhang (6); Zhengwen Sha (5); Ping Shen (4); Nana Wu (4); Yan Gong (4); Qian Chen (3); Yin Wu (3); Bin Wang (3); Jiaqin Zhao (2); Yao Li (2); Jiao Yang (1); Ru Qiao (1)	Suwon Gymnasium, Incheon; Referees: Khalid Shakir Hussein, Fadhil Kadhim Imran (IRQ)
September 22; 20:00	3× (yellow card) 1× (suspension)	Report	3× (yellow card) 1× (suspension)	Suwon Gymnasium, Incheon; Referees: Khalid Shakir Hussein, Fadhil Kadhim Imran (IRQ)

== Judo ==
Athlete	Event	Round of 32	Round of 16	Quarterfinals	Semifinals	Repechage	Final/BM	Rank
Athlete	Event	Opposition Result	Opposition Result	Opposition Result	Opposition Result	Opposition Result	Opposition Result	Rank
Navjot Chana	Men's 60 kg	Al-Marghy (KUW); W 10–0	Boldbaatar (MGL); L 0–11	did not advance				
Sushila Likmabam	Women's 48 kg	—N/a	Kubeeva (UZB); W 0s1–0	Yamagishi (JPN); L 0–10	did not advance	Wu Sg (CHN); L 0–10	did not advance	
Kalpana Thoudam	Women's 52 kg	—N/a	Khadka (NEP); W 10–0	Ma Yn (CHN); L 0–1	did not advance	Lien P-j (TPE); W 10–0	Mingazova (KAZ); L 0–10s1	5
Rajwinder Kaur	Women's +78 kg	—N/a	Bye	Javzmaa (MGL); L 0–10s1	did not advance	Sarbashova (KGZ); L 0–11s1	did not advance	

== Kabaddi ==
=== Men ===
- Rakesh Kumar
- Surjeet Singh
- Navneet Gautam
- Ajay Thakur
- Jasvir Singh
- Anup Kumar
- Gurpreet
- Rajguru
- Nitin Madne
- Surjeet Narwal
- Praveen
- Manjeet Chillar

Preliminary round

==== Group A ====
Team	Pld	W	D	L	PF	PA	PD	Pts
India	3	3	0	0	119	53	+66	6
Pakistan	3	2	1	0	86	64	+22	4
Thailand	2	0	0	2	57	117	-60	0
Bangladesh	2	0	0	2	26	54	-28	0

28 September; 14:00	India	30–15	Bangladesh	Songdo Global University Gymnasium, Incheon

29 September; 14:00	India	66–27	Thailand	Songdo Global University Gymnasium, Incheon

30 September; 16:00	India	23–11	Pakistan	Songdo Global University Gymnasium, Incheon

==== Semifinal ====
October 2
13:00

South Korea	25-36	India

==== Final ====
3 October; 11:30	Gold India	27-25	Iran Silver	Songdo Global University Gymnasium, Incheon

=== Women ===
- Tejeswari Bai
- Mamatha Poojari
- Priyanka
- Abhilasha Mahatre
- Sumitra Sharma
- Jayanthi
- Kavita
- Kavita Devi
- Anita Mavi
- Kishori Shinde
- Pooja Thakur
- Sushmita Powar

Preliminary round

==== Group A ====
Team	Pld	W	D	L	PF	PA	PD	Pts
India	2	2	0	0	74	44	+30	4
Bangladesh	2	1	0	1	48	47	+1	2
South Korea	2	0	0	2	44	75	-31	0

28 September; 09:20	India	29–18	Bangladesh	Songdo Global University Gymnasium, Incheon
28 September; 09:20		(22–5)		Songdo Global University Gymnasium, Incheon

30 September; 11:00	India	45–26	South Korea	Songdo Global University Gymnasium, Incheon
30 September; 11:00		(27–10)		Songdo Global University Gymnasium, Incheon

==== Semifinal ====
October 2
10:00

Thailand	28-41	India

==== Final ====
October 3
10:00

Gold India	31-21	Iran Silver

== Rowing ==
=== Men ===
Athlete	Event	Heats		Repechage		Final	
Athlete	Event	Time	Rank	Time	Rank	Time	Rank
Sawarn Singh	Single Sculls	7:10.65	2 R	7:10.93	1 FA	7:10.65	3rd place, bronze medalist(s)
Om Prakash; Dattu Baban Bhokanal	Double Sculls	6:41.67	3 R	6:40.77	1 FA	6:37:02	5
Dushyant Chauhan	Lightweight Single Sculls	7:23.94	2 FA	—N/a		7:26.57	3rd place, bronze medalist(s)
Manjeet Singh; Roopendra Singh	Lightweight Double Sculls	6:44.51	2 FA	—N/a		7:14.76	4
Rakesh Raliya; Vikram Singh; Sonu Laxmi Narain; Shokendar Tomar	Lightweight Quadruple Sculls	6:20.09	4 R	6:15.26	2 FA	6:16.05	5
Kapil Sharma; Ranjit Singh; Bajrang Lal Takhar; Robin Ulahannan; Sawan Kalkal; Mohammad Azad; Maninder Singh; Davinder Singh; Mohammed Ahmed	Eight	5:53.58	2 F	—N/a		5:51.84	3rd place, bronze medalist(s)

Qualification Legend: F=Final; FA=Final A (medal); FB=Final B (non-medal); R=Repechage

=== Women ===
Athlete	Event	Heats		Repechage		Final	
Athlete	Event	Time	Rank	Time	Rank	Time	Rank
Sanjukta Dung Dung; Tarunikha Pratap	Pair	8:24.48	6 FA	—N/a		8:28.13	5
Dittymol Varghese; Monalisha Chanu; Chaoba Devi; Manjula Xess	Lightweight Quadruple Sculls	7:10.24	5 R	7:05.65	5	did not advance	
Amanjot Kaur; Sanjukta Dung Dung; Narengbam Lakshmi Devi; Navneet Kaur	Quadruple Sculls	7:26.50	5 R	7:51.39	5 FB	7:10.55	8

Qualification Legend: FA=Final A (medal); FB=Final B (non-medal); R=Repechage

== Sailing ==
Men

Athlete	Event	Race												Net Points	Rank
Athlete	Event	1	2	3	4	5	6	7	8	9	10	11	12	Net Points	Rank
Chitresh Tatha	Optimist	11	6	6	6	6	5	5	5	8	5	4	6	62	6
Upamanyu Dutta; Arosh Chaudhari	420	7	6	8	5	8	8	1	7	2	7	7	8	66	7
Brijraj Verma; Pankaj Kumar	Hobie 16	4	4	4	4	6	7	4	6	6	5	6	7	56	5

Women

Athlete	Event	Race												Net Points	Rank
Athlete	Event	1	2	3	4	5	6	7	8	9	10	11	12	Net Points	Rank
Ramya Saravanan	Optimist	6	6	6	7	6	5	7	7	6	6	6	6	67	7
Nethra Kumanan	Laser Radial	5	7	6	9	4	5	8	6	7	7	7	7	70	7
Varsha Gautham; Aishwarya Nedunchezhiyan	29er	1	1	1	3	3	4	7	3	2	4	1	2	25	3rd place, bronze medalist(s)
Diya Anna Correa; Zara Khuzaima Arsiwalla	420	6	6	6	4	5	6	6	6	5	6	4	6	60	6

Open

Athlete	Event	Group stage									Semifinals	Final	
Athlete	Event	Opposition Result	Opposition Result	Opposition Result	Opposition Result	Opposition Result	Opposition Result	Opposition Result	Opposition Result	Rank	Opposition Result	Opposition Result	Rank
Ayaz Ahmed Shaikh; Nijeesh Bhaskaran; Sandip Jain; Santosh Pariyan Veettil	Match racing	Singapore (SIN); L 0–2	Japan (JPN); L 0–2	South Korea (KOR); D 1–1	Malaysia (MAS); D 1–1	Bahrain (BRN); L 0–2	China (CHN); D 1–1	Hong Kong (HKG); D 1–1	Chinese Taipei (TPE); W 2–0	6	did not advance		

== Sepaktakraw ==
Men

Athletes	Event	Group stage					Semifinal	Final / BM	
Athletes	Event	Opposition Score	Opposition Score	Opposition Score	Opposition Score	Rank	Opposition Score	Opposition Score	Rank
Jiteshor Gurumayum; Akash Yumnam; Niken Khangembam; Jotin Ngathem; Nanao Moirangthem	Regu	Brunei (BRU); W 2–0	Nepal (NEP); W w/o	South Korea (KOR); L 0–2	Malaysia (MAS); L 0–2	3	did not advance		
Jiteshor Gurumayum; Sanjeck Waikhom; Akash Yumnam; Dheeraj Kumar; Sandeep Kumar; Gopen Taiyenjam; Niken Khangembam; Lalit Kumar; Jotin Ngathem; Nanao Moirangthem; Viseyie Koso; Seitaram Thokchom	Team regu	Japan (JPN); L 1–2	Thailand (THA); L 0–3	South Korea (KOR); L 0–3	—N/a	4	did not advance		

Women

Athletes	Event	Group stage				Semifinal	Final / BM	
Athletes	Event	Opposition Score	Opposition Score	Opposition Score	Rank	Opposition Score	Opposition Score	Rank
Jimi Okram; Omita Khangenbam; Khushbu Kannojia; Priya Khaidem; Chaoba Oinam; Keneileno Nakhro	Regu	Indonesia (INA); L 0–2	Laos (LAO); L 0–2	China (CHN); L 0–2	4	did not advance		
Maipak Ayekpam; Jimi Okram; Omita Khangenbam; Thoinu Chanu; Priya Khaidem; Keneileno Nakhro; Bijata Chanu; Linthoingambi Pangambam; Navatha Ralla; Chaoba Oinam; Manisha Kumari; Dolly Srivastava	Team regu	Myanmar (MYA); L 0–3	Thailand (THA); L 0–3	South Korea (KOR); L 0–3	4	did not advance		

== Shooting ==
=== Men ===
Rifle

Athlete	Event	Qualification		Final	
Athlete	Event	Points	Rank	Points	Rank
Abhinav Bindra	10 m Air Rifle	625.4	5 Q	187.1	Bronze
Ravi Kumar	10 m Air Rifle	618.9	20	did not advance	
Sanjeev Rajput	10 m Air Rifle	618.7	21	did not advance	
Abhinav Bindra; Ravi Kumar; Sanjeev Rajput	10 m Air Rifle Team	—N/a		1863.0	Bronze
Chain Singh	50 m Air Rifle 3 Positions	1164-51X	7 Q	441.7	Bronze
Ravi Kumar	50 m Air Rifle 3 Positions	1159-38X	12	did not advance	
Gagan Narang	50 m Air Rifle 3 Positions	1157-46X	15	did not advance	
Chain Singh; Sanjeev Rajput; Gagan Narang	50 m Air Rifle 3 Positions Team	—N/a		3480-135X	4

- Hariom Singh
- Joydeep Karmakar

Pistol

Athlete	Event	Qualification		Final	
Athlete	Event	Points	Rank	Points	Rank
Om Prakash	50m pistol	555	10	did not advance	
Jitu Rai	50m pistol	559	7 Q	186.2	Gold
Omkar Singh	50m pistol	551	16	did not advance	
Om Prakash; Jitu Rai; Omkar Singh	50m pistol team	—N/a		1665	4
Prakash Nanjappa	10m air pistol	578	14	did not advance	
Samaresh Jung	10m air pistol	580	9	did not advance	
Jitu Rai	10m air pistol	585	2 Q	138.3	5
Prakash Nanjappa; Samaresh Jung; Jitu Rai	10m air pistol team	—N/a		1743	Bronze

Athlete	Event	Qualification 1		Qualification 2		Final	
Athlete	Event	Points	Rank	Points	Rank	Points	Rank
Vijay Kumar	25m center fire pistol	—N/a				579-21X	12
Gurpreet Singh	25m center fire pistol	—N/a				580-25X	9
Pemba Tamang	25m center fire pistol	—N/a				581-22X	8
Vijay Kumar; Gurpreet Singh; Pemba Tamang	25m center fire pistol team	—N/a				1740-68X	Silver
Harpreet Singh	25m rapid fire pistol	290	7	578	7	did not advance	
Gurpreet Singh	25m rapid fire pistol	284	14	570	12	did not advance	
Pemba Tamang	25m rapid fire pistol	277	18	556	20	did not advance	
Harpreet Singh; Gurpreet Singh; Pemba Tamang	25m rapid fire pistol team	—N/a				1704	4

- Vijay Kumar
- Mahaveer Singh

Shotgun

Athlete	Event	Qualification 1		Qualification 2		Semifinal		Bronze Medal	Final	
Athlete	Event	Points	Rank	Points	Rank	Points	Rank	Points	Points	Rank
Manavjit Singh Sandhu	Trap	72	4	116	14	did not advance				
Mansher Singh	Trap	69	13	117	11	did not advance				
Kynan Chenai	Trap	65	36	108	36	did not advance				
Kynan Chenai; Mansher Singh; Manavjit Singh Sandhu	Trap team	—N/a							341	6

- Mairaj Ahmad Khan
- Arozepal Sandhu
- Parampal Singh Guron
- Ankur Mittal
- Mohd Asab
- Sangram Dahiya

=== Women ===
Rifle

Athlete	Event	Qualification		Final	
Athlete	Event	Points	Rank	Points	Rank
Apurvi Chandela	10 m Air Rifle	413.8	12	did not advance	
Ayonika Paul	10 m Air Rifle	417.7	2 Q	101.9	7
Raj Chaudhary	10 m Air Rifle	407.6	35	did not advance	
Apurvi Chandela; Ayonika Paul; Raj Chaudhary	10 m Air Rifle Team	—N/a		1239.1	5
Lajja Gauswami	50 m Rifle Prone	—N/a		613.7	25
Tejaswini Muley	50 m Rifle Prone	—N/a		608.8	36
Raj Chaudhary	50 m Rifle Prone	—N/a		614.6	23
Lajja Gauswami; Tejaswini Muley; Raj Chaudhary	50 m Rifle Prone Team	—N/a		1837.1	11
Lajja Gauswami	50 m Rifle 3 Positions	582-25X	4	401.6	7
Tejaswini Muley	50 m Rifle 3 Positions	568-20X	29	did not advance	
Anjali Bhagwat	50 m Rifle 3 Positions	572-23X	25	did not advance	
Lajja Gauswami; Tejaswini Muley; Raj Chaudhary	50 m Rifle 3 Positions Team	—N/a		1722-68X	6

Pistol

Athlete	Event	Qualification		Final	
Athlete	Event	Points	Rank	Points	Rank
Malaika Goel	10m air pistol	373	24	did not advance	
Shweta Chaudhary	10m air pistol	383	4 Q	176.4	Bronze
Heena Sidhu	10m air pistol	378	13	did not advance	
Malaika Goel; Shweta Chaudhary; Heena Sidhu	10m air pistol team	—N/a		1134	5

Athlete	Event	Qualification Precision		Qualification Rapid		Semifinal		Final/BM	
Athlete	Event	Points	Rank	Points	Rank	Points	Rank	Points	Rank
Rahi Sarnobat	25m pistol	289	10	580	8 Q	15	7	did not advance	
Anisa Sayyed	25m pistol	283	25	577	10	did not advance			
Heena Sidhu	25m pistol	291	3	572	17	did not advance			
Rahi Sarnobat; Anisa Sayyed; Heena Sidhu	25m pistol team	—N/a						1729	Bronze

Shotgun

Athlete	Event	Qualification		Semifinal		Final/BM	
Athlete	Event	Points	Rank	Points	Rank	Points	Rank
Shagun Chowdhary	Trap	59	30	did not advance			
Seema Tomar	Trap	63	17	did not advance			
Shreyasi Singh	Trap	66	9	did not advance			
Shagun Chowdhary; Seema Tomar; Shreyasi Singh	Trap Team	—N/a				188	8

- Arti Singh
- Rashmee Rathore
- Varsha Varman

== Squash ==
Singles

Athlete	Event	Round of 32	Round of 16	Quarterfinals	Semifinals	Final	Rank
Athlete	Event	Opposition Score	Opposition Score	Opposition Score	Opposition Score	Opposition Score	Rank
Saurav Ghosal	Men	Bye	Al-Saraj (JOR); W 3–0	Iqbal (PAK); W 3–1	Ong B H (MAS); W 3–0	Al-Muzayen (KUW); L 2–3	2nd place, silver medalist(s)
Harinder Pal Sandhu	Men	Bye	Al-Muzayen (KUW); L 0–3	did not advance			
Joshna Chinappa	Women	—N/a	Song S-m (KOR); W 3–0	Pallikal (IND); L 2–3	did not advance		
Dipika Pallikal	Women	—N/a	Gu Jy (CHN); W 3–1	Chinappa (IND); W 3–2	David (MAS); L 0–3	did not advance	3rd place, bronze medalist(s)

Team

Athlete	Event	Group stage					Semifinals	Final	
Athlete	Event	Opposition Score	Opposition Score	Opposition Score	Opposition Score	Rank	Opposition Score	Opposition Score	Rank
Saurav Ghosal; Harinder Pal Sandhu; Kush Kumar; Mahesh Mangaonkar	Men	Jordan (JOR); W 2–1	China (CHN); W 3–0	Japan (JPN); W 3–0	Malaysia (MAS); W 1–2	2	Kuwait (KUW); W 2–0	Malaysia (MAS); W 2–0	1st place, gold medalist(s)
Dipika Pallikal; Joshna Chinappa; Anaka Alankamony; Aparajitha Balamurukan	Women	Hong Kong (HKG); W 2–1	Pakistan (PAK); W 3–0	China (CHN); W 3–0	—N/a	1	South Korea (KOR); W 2–0	Malaysia (MAS); L 0–2	2nd place, silver medalist(s)

== Swimming ==
=== Men ===
Athlete	Event	Heat		Final	
Athlete	Event	Time	Rank	Time	Rank
Saurabh Sangvekar	200 m freestyle	1:53.33	5	did not advance	
Madhu P S	100 m backstroke	57.81	7	did not advance	
Aaron D'Souza	200 m butterfly	2:04.74	4	did not advance	
Madhu P S	50 m backstroke	26.85	6	did not advance	
Anshul Kothari	50 m freestyle	23.94	5	did not advance	
Sajan Prakash	400 m freestyle	3:59.27	4	did not advance	
Saurabh Sangvekar	400 m freestyle	3:59.66	7	did not advance	
Sajan Prakash	100 m butterfly	55.64	6	did not advance	
Sandeep Sejwal	100 m breaststroke	1:03.09	5	did not advance	
Anshul Kothari; Sajan Prakash; Neil Contractor; Aaron D'Souza	4X100 m freestyle relay	—N/a		3:25.94	7
Anshul Kothari	50 m butterfly	25.67	6	did not advance	
Neil Contractor	100 m freestyle	53.01	7	did not advance	
Aaron D'Souza	100 m freestyle	51.20	5	did not advance	
Madhu P S	200 m backstroke	2:10.13	6	did not advance	
Sandeep Sejwal	50 m breaststroke	28.25	1	0:28.26	Bronze
Saurabh Sangvekar	1500 m freestyle	16:23.46	5	did not advance	

== Table tennis ==
Singles

Athlete	Event	Round 1	Round 2	Round 3	Quarterfinal	Semifinal	Final	
Athlete	Event	Opposition Result	Opposition Result	Opposition Result	Opposition Result	Opposition Result	Opposition Result	Rank
Sharath Kamal	Men	Bye	Tanviriyavechakul (THA); L 3–4	did not advance				
Soumyajit Ghosh	Men	Bye	Phathaphone (LAO); W 4–0	Pak S-h (PRK); L 1–4	did not advance			
Manika Batra	Women	Bye	Ma C I (MAC); W 4–0	Ishikawa (JPN); L 0–4	did not advance			
Ankita Das	Women	Al-Shammari (KUW); W 4–0	Ng W N (HKG); L 2–4	did not advance				

Doubles

Athlete	Event	Round 1	Round 2	Round 3	Quarterfinal	Semifinal	Final	
Athlete	Event	Opposition Result	Opposition Result	Opposition Result	Opposition Result	Opposition Result	Opposition Result	Rank
Soumyajit Ghosh; Harmeet Desai	Men	Bye	Al-Kades / Gubran (YEM); W 3–0	Xu X / Fan Zd (CHN); L 1–3	did not advance			
Sharath Kamal; Anthony Amalraj	Men	Bye	Bajracharya / Malla (NEP); W 3–1	Niwa / Matsudaira (JPN); L 0–3	did not advance			
Poulomi Ghatak; Ankita Das	Women	—N/a	Kashif / Bilal (PAK); W 3–0	Park Y-s / Yang H-e (KOR); L 0–3	did not advance			
Madhurika Patkar; Neha Aggarwal	Women	—N/a	Nisa / Shareef (MDV); W 3–0	Zhu Yl / Chen M (CHN); L 0–3	did not advance			
Sharath Kamal; Poulomi Ghatak	Mixed	Bye	Tanviriyavechakul / Sawettabut (THA); L 0–3	did not advance				
Anthony Amalraj; Madhurika Patkar	Mixed	Bye	Mönkh-Orgil / Enkhjin (MGL); W 3–0	Kishikawa / Fukuhara (JPN); L 1–3	did not advance			

Team

Athlete	Event	Group stage				Quarterfinal	Semifinal	Final	
Athlete	Event	Opposition Result	Opposition Result	Opposition Result	Rank	Opposition Result	Opposition Result	Opposition Result	Rank
Soumyajit Ghosh; Harmeet Desai; Sharath Kamal; Anthony Amalraj	Men	Kuwait (KUW); W 3–0	Nepal (NEP); W 3–0	South Korea (KOR); L 0–3	2 Q	China (CHN); L 0–3	did not advance		
Poulomi Ghatak; Ankita Das; Madhurika Patkar; Neha Aggarwal; Manika Batra	Women	Malaysia (MAS); W 3–0	Nepal (NEP); W 3–0	China (CHN); L 0–3	2 Q	Singapore (SIN); L 0–3	did not advance		

== Taekwondo ==
Men

Athlete	Event	Round of 32	Round of 16	Quarterfinal	Semifinal	Final	
Athlete	Event	Opposition Result	Opposition Result	Opposition Result	Opposition Result	Opposition Result	Rank
Saurav Kumar	63 kg	Bye	Joshi (NEP); W 8–5	Abasi (AFG); L 4–5	did not advance		
Shiv Kumar	68 kg	Bye	Al-Asmari (KSA); L 7–11	did not advance			
Jasvant	74 kg	Bye	Samaha (LIB); W 4–1	Hajji-Zavareh (IRI); L 0–8	did not advance		
Anand Pandiarajan	80 kg	—N/a	Park Y-h (KOR); L 1–7	did not advance			
Nakul Malhotra	+87 kg	—N/a		El-Hidari (LIB); L 1–2	did not advance		

=== Women ===
Athlete	Event	Round of 32	Round of 16	Quarterfinal	Semifinal	Final	
Athlete	Event	Opposition Result	Opposition Result	Opposition Result	Opposition Result	Opposition Result	Rank
Latika Bhandari	53 kg	—N/a	Radzhabova (TJK); W 7–2	Yoon J-y (KOR); L 1–13	did not advance		
Aarti Khakal	57 kg	Alzak (KAZ); L 8–15	did not advance				
Rekha Gogoi	62 kg	—N/a	Bye	Chuang C-c (TPE); L 0–15	did not advance		
Shreya Singh	67 kg	—N/a	Lee W-j (KOR); L 6–7	did not advance			
Shaloo Raikwar	73 kg	—N/a	Bye	Al-Fahad (KUW); L 3–3	did not advance		
Margerette Regi	+73 kg	—N/a		Li Dh (CHN); L 1–15	did not advance		

== Tennis ==
Singles

Athlete	Event	Round 1	Round 2	Round 3	Quarterfinal	Semifinal	Final	
Athlete	Event	Opposition Result	Opposition Result	Opposition Result	Opposition Result	Opposition Result	Opposition Result	Rank
Sanam Singh	Men	Bye	Al-Shatti (KUW); W 6–1, 6–2	Chung Ho (KOR); W 7–5, 6–1	Lu Y-h (TPE); L 6–7, 3–6	did not advance		
Yuki Bhambri	Men	Bye	Al-Mutawa (QAT); W 6–1, 6–0	Rungkat (INA); W 6–3, 6–3	Udomchoke (THA); W 6–3, 6–2	Nishioka (JPN); L 6–3, 2–6, 1–6	did not advance	3rd place, bronze medalist(s)
Natasha Palha	Women	Bye	Lertcheewakarn (THA); L 5–7, 3–6	did not advance				
Ankita Raina	Women	Bye	Gotov (MGL); W 6–0, 6–0	Hozumi (JPN); L 2–6, 6–4, 1–6	did not advance			

Doubles

Athlete	Event	Round 1	Round 2	Quarterfinal	Semifinal	Final	
Athlete	Event	Opposition Result	Opposition Result	Opposition Result	Opposition Result	Opposition Result	Rank
Saketh Myneni; Sanam Singh	Men	Cho M-h / Nam J-s (KOR); W 6–3, 6–4	Alhaqbani / Ahmed (KSA); W 6–0, 6–1	Chen T / Peng H-y (TPE); W 6–2, 7–6^{(12–10)}	Sa Ratiwatana / So Ratiwatana (THA); W 4–6, 6–3, [10–6]	Lim Y-k / Chung Ho (KOR); L 5–7, 6–7^{(2–7)}	2nd place, silver medalist(s)
Yuki Bhambri; Divij Sharan	Men	Bye	Wong C-h / Yeung P-l (HKG); W 6–2, 6–3	Lee H-h / Wang (TPE); W 7–5, 7–6^{(7–1)}	Lim Y-k / Chung Ho (KOR); L 7–6^{(10–8)}, 6–7^{(6–8)}, [9–11]	did not advance	3rd place, bronze medalist(s)
Rishika Sunkara; Shweta Rana	Women	Mansoor / Suhail (PAK); W 6–4, 6–0	Aoyama / Hozumi (JPN); L 1–6, 4–6	did not advance			
Prarthana Thombare; Sania Mirza	Women	Bye	Enkhbayar / Gotov (MGL); W 6–0, 6–0	Plipuech / Lertpitaksinchai (THA); W 6–1, 7–6^{(7–4)}	Hsieh S-w / Chan C-w (TPE); W 6–7^{(1–7)}, 6–2, [4–10]	did not advance	3rd place, bronze medalist(s)
Saketh Myneni; Sania Mirza	Mixed	Bye	Fayziev / Sharipova (UZB); W 6–3, 6–4	Kim C-e / Han N-l (KOR); W 6–3, 7–6^{(7–4)}	Zhang Z / Zheng J (CHN); W 6–1, 6–3	Peng H-y / Chan H-c (TPE); W 6–4, 6–3	1st place, gold medalist(s)
Divij Sharan; Ankita Raina	Mixed	Mämmetgulyýew / Prenko (TKM); W 6–4, 6–1	Yoo M / Lim Y-k (KOR); L 4–6, 2–6	did not advance			

Team

Athlete	Event	Round 1	Round 2	Quarterfinals	Semifinals	Final	
Athlete	Event	Opposition Result	Opposition Result	Opposition Result	Opposition Result	Opposition Result	Rank
Sanam Singh; Yuki Bhambri; Saketh Myneni; Divij Sharan	Men	Bye	Nepal (NEP); W 3–0	Kazakhstan (KAZ); L 1–2	did not advance		
Prarthana Thombare; Ankita Raina; Natasha Palha; Rishika Sunkara	Women	—N/a	Oman (OMA); W 3–0	Kazakhstan (KAZ); L 1–2	did not advance		

== Volleyball ==
=== Men ===
- Vaishnav Govindrajan Ramakrishnan
- Navjit Singh
- Lamveet Katraria
- Naveen Raja Jacob Maninduran
- Prabagaran
- Dilip Khoiwal
- Mandeep Singh
- Gurinder Singh
- Jirom Vinith Charles
- Ukkrapandian Mohan
- Ranjit Singh
- Kanagaraj Sivasubramanian

==== Group C ====
Pos	Team	Pld	W	L	Pts	SW	SL	SR	SPW	SPL	SPR	Qualification
1	Iran	3	3	0	9	9	0	MAX	225	157	1.433	Play-off / Group E–F
2	India	3	2	1	6	6	4	1.500	235	201	1.169	Play-off / Group E–F
3	Hong Kong	3	1	2	3	4	6	0.667	200	232	0.862	Play-off / Group G–H
4	Maldives	3	0	3	0	0	9	0.000	155	225	0.689	Play-off / Group G–H

Source: Results

Date	Time	Venue		Score		Set 1	Set 2	Set 3	Set 4	Set 5	Total	Report
20 Sep	16:30	ASG	India	3–1	Hong Kong	23–25	25–18	25–16	25–21		98–80	98–80
24 Sep	15:00	SOG	India	3–0	Maldives	25-10	25-19	25-17			75–0	75-46
26 Sep	17:00	SOG	Iran	3–0	India	25-22	25-22	25-18			75–0	75-62

==== Quarterfinal Final ====
October 1
12:00

Japan	20-25, 25–19, 23-25, 25-20, 15-13	India

=== Women ===
- Soumya
- Rekha S.
- Nirmala
- Reshma P P
- Sheeba P. V.
- Preeti Singh
- Tiji Raju
- Poornima M.S.
- Ansuri Ghosh
- Terin Antony
- Srutimon N.
- Priyanaka Khadar

==== Group A ====
Pos	Team	Pld	W	L	Pts	SW	SL	SR	SPW	SPL	SPR	Qualification
1	South Korea	3	3	0	9	9	0	MAX	225	143	1.573	Quarterfinals
2	Thailand	3	2	1	6	6	4	1.500	237	202	1.173	Quarterfinals
3	Japan	3	1	2	3	4	6	0.667	211	204	1.034	Quarterfinals
4	India	3	0	3	0	0	9	0.000	101	225	0.449	Quarterfinal qualification

Source: Results

Date	Time	Venue		Score		Set 1	Set 2	Set 3	Set 4	Set 5	Total	Report
20 Sep	17:30	SOG	South Korea	3–0	India	25-5	25-12	25-13			75–0	75-30
22 Sep	13:00	ASG	India	0–3	Japan	6-25	11-25	12-25			29–0	29-75
24 Sep	13:00	ASG	Thailand	3–0	India	25-19	25-12	25-11			75–0	75-42

== Weightlifting ==
=== Men ===
Athlete	Event	Snatch			Clean & jerk			Total	Rank
Athlete	Event	Attempt 1	Attempt 2	Attempt 3	Attempt 1	Attempt 2	Attempt 3	Total	Rank
Sukhen Dey	Men's 56 kg	103	106	108	X	133	136	242	12
Sathish Sivalingam	Men's 77 kg	did not start							
Katulu Ravi Kumar	Men's 77 kg	X	137	141	167	172	X	313	10
Vikas Thakur	Men's 85 kg	140	145	148	170	179	X	327	7

=== Women ===
Athlete	Event	Snatch			Clean & jerk			Total	Rank
Athlete	Event	Attempt 1	Attempt 2	Attempt 3	Attempt 1	Attempt 2	Attempt 3	Total	Rank
Khumukcham Sanjita Chanu	Women's 48 kg	70	73	X	90	93	X	166	10
Mirabai Chanu	Women's 48 kg	70	73	75	90	93	96	171	9
Punam Yadav	Women's 63 kg	83	87	90	110	X	X	200	7

== Wrestling ==
=== Men ===
Freestyle

Athlete	Event	Round of 16	Quarterfinals	Semifinals	Repechage	Final / BM	Rank
Athlete	Event	Opposition Result	Opposition Result	Opposition Result	Opposition Result	Opposition Result	Rank
Amit Kumar Dahiya	57 kg	Morishita (JPN); L 2–2	did not advance				
Bajrang Punia	61 kg	Tuvshintulga (MGL); W 5–5	Usmonzoda (TJK); W 17–7	Takatsuka (JPN); W 2–2	—N/a	Esmaeilpour (IRI); L 4–6	2nd place, silver medalist(s)
Yogeshwar Dutt	65 kg	Bye	Kang J-h (PRK); W 7–4	Katai (CHN); W 9–7	—N/a	Yusupov (TJK); W 1–0	1st place, gold medalist(s)
Parveen Rana	70 kg	Kojima (JPN); L 2–3	did not advance				
Narsingh Yadav	74 kg	Kurbanov (UZB); L 2–3	did not advance		Kambarow (TKM); W 11–1	Shimada (JPN); W 10–7	3rd place, bronze medalist(s)
Pawan Kumar	86 kg	Shah (NEP); W 10–0	Mostafa-Jokar (IRI); L 0–10	did not advance	Zhang F (CHN); L 1–4	did not advance	
Satyawart Kadian	97 kg	Bye	Musaev (KGZ); L 2–3	did not advance	Awan (PAK); W 12–0	Ibragimov (KAZ); L 0–3	5

Greco-Roman

Athlete	Event	Round of 16	Quarterfinals	Semifinals	Repechage	Final / BM	Rank
Athlete	Event	Opposition Result	Opposition Result	Opposition Result	Opposition Result	Opposition Result	Rank
Ravinder Singh	59 kg	Kebispayev (KAZ); L 0–1	did not advance				
Sandeep Tulsi Yadav	66 kg	Obloberdiev (TJK); L 0–10	did not advance				
Krishan Kant Yadav	71 kg	Bye	Jung J-h (KOR); L 0–8	did not advance	—N/a	Abdevali (IRI); L 0–6	5
Gurpreet Singh	75 kg	Badr (QAT); W 10–0	Bouyeri (IRI); L 2–7	did not advance			
Harpreet Singh	80 kg	—N/a	Saldadze (UZB); L 2–4	did not advance			
Manoj Kumar	85 kg	Bye	Peng F (CHN); L 0–4	did not advance			
Dharmender Dalal	130 kg	Babajanzadeh (IRI); L 0–8	did not advance				

=== Women ===
Freestyle

Athlete	Event	Round of 16	Quarterfinals	Semifinals	Repechage	Final / BM	Rank
Athlete	Event	Opposition Result	Opposition Result	Opposition Result	Opposition Result	Opposition Result	Rank
Vinesh Phogat	48 kg	Pak Y-m (PRK); W 4–3	Yakhshimuratova (UZB); W 10–0	Tosaka (JPN); L 4–6	Bye	Narangerel (MGL); W 10–0	3rd place, bronze medalist(s)
Babita Kumari	55 kg	Mao (CAM); W 10–0	Abdildina (KAZ); W 13–10	Yoshida (JPN); L 4–14	Bye	Zhong Xc (CHN); L 2–10	5
Geetika Jakhar	63 kg	Larionova (KAZ); W 5–4	Autnun (THA); W 8–0	Xiluo Zm (CHN); L 2–11	Bye	Lý T H (VIE); W 4–0	3rd place, bronze medalist(s)
Jyoti	75 kg	—N/a	Burmaa (MGL); L 0–10	did not advance	—N/a	did not advance	

== Wushu ==
=== Men ===
Changquan

Athlete	Score	Rank
Anjul Namdeo	9.03	9

Nangquan/Nangun

Athlete	Nangquan		Nangun		Total	Rank
Athlete	Points	Rank	Points	Rank	Total	Rank
Sajan Lama	9.07	9	7.95	13	17.01	11

Sanda

Athlete	Event	Round of 16	Quarterfinal	Semifinal	Final	Rank
Athlete	Event	Opposition Result	Opposition Result	Opposition Result	Opposition Result	Rank
Santosh Kumar	56 kg	Railin Rizaidin (KAZ); L	did not advance			
Narender Grewal	60 kg	Mangal Prasad Tharu (NEP); W	Abdullah (PAK); W	Jean Claude Saclag (PHI); L	did not advance	Bronze
Bimoljit Singh Mayanglambam	65 kg	Salaheddin Bayramov (TKM); L	did not advance			
Rajan Deori	65 kg	BYE	Sy Van Ngo (VIE); L	did not advance		

=== Women ===
Changquan

Athlete	Score	Rank
Sapna Devi Yumlembam	9.27	7

Sanda

Athlete	Event	Round of 16	Quarterfinal	Semifinal	Final	Rank
Athlete	Event	Opposition Result	Opposition Result	Opposition Result	Opposition Result	Rank
Sanathoi Devi Yamnam	52 kg	Mubarak Kamalova (UZB); W	Amgalanjargal Sangidorj (MGL); W	Luan Zhang (CHN); L	did not advance	Bronze
Sandhyarani Devi Wangkhem	60 kg	Thi Ly Tan (VIE); L	did not advance			

== Preparation and sponsorships ==
The Gujarat Cooperative Milk Marketing Federation, that manages dairy cooperative Amul, announced its memorandum of understanding (MoU) with the Indian Olympic Association on 11 July 2014. This MoU has made Amul the official sponsor of the Indian contingent at the 2014 Asian Games and Commonwealth Games, which was held in Glasgow, Scotland.
