= Gymnastics at the 2014 Asian Games – Women's artistic individual all-around =

Women's individual all-around at the 2014 Asian Games
- Venue: Namdong Gymnasium
- Date: 22–23 September 2014
- Competitors: 59 from 15 nations

Medalists
gold medal	Yao Jinnan	China
silver medal	Shang Chunsong	China
bronze medal	Yun Na-rae	South Korea

The women's artistic individual all-around competition at the 2014 Asian Games in Incheon, South Korea was held on 22 and 23 September 2014 at the Namdong Gymnasium.

== Schedule ==
All times are Korea Standard Time (UTC+09:00)

Date	Time	Event
Monday, 22 September 2014	11:00	Qualification
Tuesday, 23 September 2014	18:00	Final

== Results ==
=== Qualification ===
Rank	Athlete	Vault (gymnastics)	Uneven bars	Balance beam	Floor (gymnastics)	Total
1	Yao Jinnan (CHN)	14.450	15.650	14.250	13.800	58.150
2	Shang Chunsong (CHN)	13.800	14.150	14.900	13.950	56.800
3	Chen Siyi (CHN)	14.775	14.650	13.550	13.775	56.750
4	Azumi Ishikura (JPN)	13.750	13.600	14.000	13.000	54.350
5	Yun Na-rae (KOR)	14.150	13.750	13.000	13.400	54.300
6	Hong Un-jong (PRK)	15.350	13.400	11.800	13.200	53.750
7	Yuriko Yamamoto (JPN)	14.050	13.750	12.700	13.150	53.650
8	Kim Un-hyang (PRK)	13.650	12.950	14.250	12.800	53.650
9	Kang Yong-mi (PRK)	13.600	12.850	12.950	13.400	52.800
10	Akiho Sato (JPN)	13.900	12.850	12.300	13.250	52.300
11	Dilnoza Abdusalimova (UZB)	13.700	12.450	13.000	13.050	52.200
12	Sakura Yumoto (JPN)	13.800	13.000	12.750	11.700	51.250
13	Park Ji-soo (KOR)	13.650	11.900	12.250	13.250	51.050
14	Lim Heem Wei (SIN)	13.400	12.475	12.550	12.550	50.975
15	Jeong Hee-yeon (KOR)	13.500	12.600	11.750	12.500	50.350
16	Farah Ann Abdul Hadi (MAS)	13.650	10.450	13.000	13.225	50.325
17	Asal Saparbaeva (UZB)	13.250	11.750	12.100	12.900	50.000
18	Arailym Darmenova (KAZ)	12.950	11.250	12.350	12.600	49.150
19	Elena Rega (UZB)	12.650	11.750	11.700	12.650	48.750
20	Aida Bauyrzhanova (KAZ)	13.200	9.900	13.000	12.600	48.700
21	Zhanerke Duisek (KAZ)	12.700	10.750	12.350	12.650	48.450
22	Đỗ Thị Vân Anh (VIE)	13.700	10.200	12.050	12.200	48.150
23	Dipa Karmakar (IND)	13.950	10.150	12.600	11.150	47.850
24	Anna Geidt (KAZ)	13.150	10.050	10.950	12.650	46.800
25	Khilola Doniyorova (UZB)	12.600	10.850	10.850	12.150	46.450
26	Lo Yu-ju (TPE)	12.600	9.750	11.700	12.250	46.300
27	Chen Feng-chih (TPE)	12.500	9.350	12.000	12.000	45.850
28	Đỗ Thị Thu Huyền (VIE)	12.200	10.350	11.850	11.150	45.550
29	Praewpraw Doungchan (THA)	13.300	9.950	11.650	10.600	45.500
30	Pranati Nayak (IND)	13.425	9.450	10.950	10.850	44.675
31	Pranati Das (IND)	13.050	8.650	11.250	10.750	43.700
32	Fan Chieh-ting (TPE)	12.450	8.050	11.100	11.850	43.450
33	Wu Jhih-han (TPE)	12.700	9.200	10.950	10.575	43.425
34	Aruna Reddy (IND)	13.600	7.650	10.600	11.300	43.150
35	Lin Tseng-nung (TPE)	13.200	9.850	8.250	11.850	43.150
36	Baatarjavyn Ichinkhorloo (MGL)	12.450	9.875	10.050	10.300	42.675
37	Yekaterina Chuikina (KAZ)	11.200	7.300	10.050	11.600	40.150
38	Batbaataryn Soyolsaikhan (MGL)	11.800	7.600	8.475	8.600	36.475
	Bai Yawen (CHN)	12.900		14.350	11.700	
	Huang Huidan (CHN)		15.450	13.450		
	Tan Jiaxin (CHN)	14.850	15.150		11.950	
	Angel Wong (HKG)	13.300		11.850	12.750	
	Payel Bhattacharjee (IND)	11.850	7.900			
	Rucha Divekar (IND)			10.150	10.200	
	Minami Honda (JPN)		13.700	13.450		
	Mizuho Nagai (JPN)	14.200			12.050	
	Eum Da-yeon (KOR)		12.650	12.825		
	Kim Chae-yeon (KOR)		12.600	10.700	11.050	
	Lee Hye-been (KOR)	13.700			13.150	
	Enkhtüvshingiin Batmaa (MGL)		7.200			
	Jong Un-gyong (PRK)	13.425	12.900			
	Kim So-yong (PRK)		9.725	13.850	12.800	
	Ri Un-ha (PRK)	14.550		12.150	12.400	
	Farah Tarek Mahmoud (QAT)		10.200			
	Janessa Dai (SIN)	13.050	11.950			
	Joey Tam (SIN)			13.550	11.900	
	Anastasiya Belkova (UZB)					
	Oksana Chusovitina (UZB)	15.000	0.000		0.000	
	Phan Thị Hà Thanh (VIE)	14.400		13.800	13.500	

=== Final ===
Rank	Athlete	Vault (gymnastics)	Uneven bars	Balance beam	Floor (gymnastics)	Total
1st place, gold medalist(s)	Yao Jinnan (CHN)	14.550	15.450	14.250	13.650	57.900
2nd place, silver medalist(s)	Shang Chunsong (CHN)	13.650	15.350	14.900	13.050	56.950
3rd place, bronze medalist(s)	Yun Na-rae (KOR)	14.050	13.600	13.850	13.500	55.000
4	Yuriko Yamamoto (JPN)	13.850	13.450	12.750	13.300	53.350
5	Dilnoza Abdusalimova (UZB)	13.650	12.650	13.450	12.950	52.700
6	Azumi Ishikura (JPN)	13.675	12.100	13.850	12.850	52.475
7	Farah Ann Abdul Hadi (MAS)	13.650	12.800	12.250	13.050	51.750
8	Park Ji-soo (KOR)	13.700	12.475	13.150	12.250	51.575
9	Kim Un-hyang (PRK)	13.100	13.050	12.550	11.550	50.250
10	Dipa Karmakar (IND)	13.600	10.550	12.600	12.300	49.050
11	Aida Bauyrzhanova (KAZ)	13.250	11.975	12.650	11.150	49.025
12	Elena Rega (UZB)	12.650	12.250	11.600	12.100	48.600
13	Praewpraw Doungchan (THA)	13.400	11.400	11.950	11.800	48.550
14	Lim Heem Wei (SIN)	12.000	11.350	12.800	11.850	48.000
15	Đỗ Thị Thu Huyền (VIE)	11.700	10.700	11.900	11.900	46.200
16	Lo Yu-ju (TPE)	13.550	9.500	11.250	11.600	45.900
17	Đỗ Thị Vân Anh (VIE)	13.300	10.550	9.650	11.100	44.600
18	Arailym Darmenova (KAZ)	11.850	9.350	11.350	11.800	44.350
19	Chen Feng-chih (TPE)	12.400	8.725	12.100	10.900	44.125
20	Pranati Nayak (IND)	13.450	9.500	10.600	10.250	43.800
21	Baatarjavyn Ichinkhorloo (MGL)	12.200	10.500	10.100	9.950	42.750
22	Batbaataryn Soyolsaikhan (MGL)	11.850	8.150	9.550	10.325	39.875
