= Gymnastics at the 2014 Asian Games – Women's artistic team =

Women's team at the 2014 Asian Games
- Venue: Namdong Gymnasium
- Date: 22 September 2014
- Competitors: 46 from 8 nations

Medalists
gold medal	China; Bai Yawen, Chen Siyi, Huang Huidan, Shang Chunsong, Tan Jiaxin, Yao Jinnan
silver medal	North Korea; Hong Un-jong, Jong Un-gyong, Kang Yong-mi, Kim So-yong, Kim Un-hyang, Ri Un-ha
bronze medal	Japan; Minami Honda, Azumi Ishikura, Mizuho Nagai, Akiho Sato, Yuriko Yamamoto, Sakura Yumoto

The women's artistic team competition at the 2014 Asian Games in Incheon, South Korea was held on 22 September 2014 at the Namdong Gymnasium.

== Schedule ==
All times are Korea Standard Time (UTC+09:00)

Date	Time	Event
Monday, 22 September 2014	11:00	Final

== Results ==
Rank	Team	Vault (gymnastics)	Uneven bars	Balance beam	Floor (gymnastics)	Total
1st place, gold medalist(s)	China (CHN)	57.875	60.900	57.050	53.475	229.300
	Bai Yawen	~~12.900~~		14.350	~~11.700~~	
	Chen Siyi	14.775	14.650	13.550	13.775	
	Huang Huidan		15.450	~~13.450~~		
	Shang Chunsong	13.800	~~14.150~~	14.900	13.950	
	Tan Jiaxin	14.850	15.150		11.950	
	Yao Jinnan	14.450	15.650	14.250	13.800	
2nd place, silver medalist(s)	North Korea (PRK)	57.150	52.100	53.200	52.200	214.650
	Hong Un-jong	15.350	13.400	~~11.800~~	13.200	
	Jong Un-gyong	~~13.425~~	12.900			
	Kang Yong-mi	13.600	12.850	12.950	13.400	
	Kim So-yong		~~9.725~~	13.850	12.800	
	Kim Un-hyang	13.650	12.950	14.250	12.800	
	Ri Un-ha	14.550		12.150	~~12.400~~	
3rd place, bronze medalist(s)	Japan (JPN)	55.950	54.050	52.900	51.450	214.350
	Minami Honda		13.700	13.450		
	Azumi Ishikura	~~13.750~~	13.600	14.000	13.000	
	Mizuho Nagai	14.200			12.050	
	Akiho Sato	13.900	~~12.850~~	~~12.300~~	13.250	
	Yuriko Yamamoto	14.050	13.750	12.700	13.150	
	Sakura Yumoto	13.800	13.000	12.750	~~11.700~~	
4	South Korea (KOR)	55.000	51.600	49.825	52.300	208.725
	Eum Da-yeon		12.650	12.825		
	Jeong Hee-yeon	13.500	12.600	11.750	12.500	
	Kim Chae-yeon		12.600	~~10.700~~	~~11.050~~	
	Lee Hye-been	13.700			13.150	
	Park Ji-soo	13.650	~~11.900~~	12.250	13.250	
	Yun Na-rae	14.150	13.750	13.000	13.400	
5	Uzbekistan (UZB)	54.600	46.800	47.650	50.750	199.800
	Dilnoza Abdusalimova	13.700	12.450	13.000	13.050	
	Anastasiya Belkova					
	Oksana Chusovitina	15.000	~~0.000~~		~~0.000~~	
	Khilola Doniyorova	~~12.600~~	10.850	10.850	12.150	
	Elena Rega	12.650	11.750	11.700	12.650	
	Asal Saparbaeva	13.250	11.750	12.100	12.900	
6	Kazakhstan (KAZ)	52.000	41.950	48.650	50.500	193.100
	Aida Bauyrzhanova	13.200	9.900	13.000	12.600	
	Yekaterina Chuikina	~~11.200~~	~~7.300~~	~~10.050~~	~~11.600~~	
	Arailym Darmenova	12.950	11.250	12.350	12.600	
	Zhanerke Duisek	12.700	10.750	12.350	12.650	
	Anna Geidt	13.150	10.050	10.950	12.650	
7	Chinese Taipei (TPE)	51.000	38.150	45.750	47.950	182.850
	Chen Feng-chih	12.500	9.350	12.000	12.000	
	Fan Chieh-ting	~~12.450~~	~~8.050~~	11.100	11.850	
	Lin Tseng-nung	13.200	9.850	~~8.250~~	11.850	
	Lo Yu-ju	12.600	9.750	11.700	12.250	
	Wu Jhih-han	12.700	9.200	10.950	~~10.575~~	
8	India (IND)	54.025	36.150	45.400	44.050	179.625
	Payel Bhattacharjee	~~11.850~~	7.900			
	Pranati Das	13.050	8.650	11.250	10.750	
	Rucha Divekar			~~10.150~~	~~10.200~~	
	Dipa Karmakar	13.950	10.150	12.600	11.150	
	Pranati Nayak	13.425	9.450	10.950	10.850	
	Aruna Reddy	13.600	~~7.650~~	10.600	11.300	
