= Gymnastics at the 2014 Asian Games – Women's vault =

Women's vault at the 2014 Asian Games
- Venue: Namdong Gymnasium
- Date: 22–24 September 2014
- Competitors: 16 from 11 nations

Medalists
gold medal	Hong Un-jong	North Korea
silver medal	Oksana Chusovitina	Uzbekistan
bronze medal	Phan Thị Hà Thanh	Vietnam

The women's vault competition at the 2014 Asian Games in Incheon, South Korea was held on 22 and 24 September 2014 at the Namdong Gymnasium.

== Schedule ==
All times are Korea Standard Time (UTC+09:00)

Date	Time	Event
Monday, 22 September 2014	11:00	Qualification
Wednesday, 24 September 2014	19:50	Final

== Results ==
=== Qualification ===
Rank	Athlete	Vault 1	Vault 2	Total
1	Hong Un-jong (PRK)	15.350	15.350	15.350
2	Oksana Chusovitina (UZB)	15.000	14.350	14.675
3	Dipa Karmakar (IND)	13.950	14.850	14.400
4	Ri Un-ha (PRK)	14.550	13.850	14.200
5	Phan Thị Hà Thanh (VIE)	14.400	13.950	14.175
6	Đỗ Thị Vân Anh (VIE)	13.700	13.550	13.625
7	Angel Wong (HKG)	13.300	13.600	13.450
8	Dilnoza Abdusalimova (UZB)	13.700	13.150	13.425
9	Aruna Reddy (IND)	13.600	13.150	13.375
10	Sakura Yumoto (JPN)	13.800	12.900	13.350
11	Lim Heem Wei (SIN)	13.400	13.100	13.250
12	Praewpraw Doungchan (THA)	13.300	13.200	13.250
13	Farah Ann Abdul Hadi (MAS)	13.650	12.550	13.100
14	Anna Geidt (KAZ)	13.150	13.050	13.100
15	Lin Tseng-nung (TPE)	13.200	12.850	13.025
16	Lo Yu-ju (TPE)	12.600	12.600	12.600

=== Final ===
Rank	Athlete	Vault 1	Vault 2	Total
1st place, gold medalist(s)	Hong Un-jong (PRK)	15.533	15.166	15.349
2nd place, silver medalist(s)	Oksana Chusovitina (UZB)	14.900	14.600	14.750
3rd place, bronze medalist(s)	Phan Thị Hà Thanh (VIE)	14.866	14.500	14.683
4	Dipa Karmakar (IND)	13.800	14.600	14.200
5	Ri Un-ha (PRK)	14.500	13.266	13.883
6	Dilnoza Abdusalimova (UZB)	12.833	13.500	13.166
7	Angel Wong (HKG)	13.533	12.600	13.066
8	Đỗ Thị Vân Anh (VIE)	13.100	13.000	13.050
