= Athletics at the 2014 Asian Games – Women's 20 kilometres walk =

Women's 20 kilometres walk at the 2014 Asian Games
- Venue: Incheon Asiad Main Stadium
- Dates: 28 September 2014
- Competitors: 8 from 7 nations

Medalists
gold medal	Lü Xiuzhi	China
silver medal	Khushbir Kaur	India
bronze medal	Jeon Yeong-eun	South Korea

The women's 20 kilometres walk event at the 2014 Asian Games was held on the streets of Incheon, South Korea on 28 September.

== Schedule ==
All times are Korea Standard Time (UTC+09:00)

Date	Time	Event
Sunday, 28 September 2014	11:00	Final

== Records ==
Prior to this competition, the existing world, Asian and Games records were as follows.

World Record	Elena Lashmanova (RUS)	1:25:02	London, United Kingdom	11 August 2012
Asian Record	Qieyang Shijie (CHN)	1:25:16	London, United Kingdom	11 August 2012
Games Record	Liu Hong (CHN)	1:30:06	Guangzhou, China	23 November 2010

== Results ==
Legend

- DSQ — Disqualified

Rank	Athlete	Time	Notes
1st place, gold medalist(s)	Lü Xiuzhi (CHN)	1:31:06	
2nd place, silver medalist(s)	Khushbir Kaur (IND)	1:33:07	
3rd place, bronze medalist(s)	Jeon Yeong-eun (KOR)	1:33:18	
4	Nie Jingjing (CHN)	1:34:54	
5	Rei Inoue (JPN)	1:36:21	
6	Ching Siu Nga (HKG)	1:41:50	
7	Chang Chia-feng (TPE)	1:43:02	
—	Nguyễn Thị Thanh Phúc (VIE)	DSQ	
