= Athletics at the 2014 Asian Games – Women's javelin throw =

Women's javelin throw at the 2014 Asian Games
- Venue: Incheon Asiad Main Stadium
- Dates: 1 October 2014
- Competitors: 9 from 7 nations

Medalists
gold medal	Zhang Li	China
silver medal	Li Lingwei	China
bronze medal	Annu Rani	India

The women's javelin throw event at the 2014 Asian Games was held at the Incheon Asiad Main Stadium, Incheon, South Korea on 1 October.

== Schedule ==
All times are Korea Standard Time (UTC+09:00)

Date	Time	Event
Wednesday, 1 October 2014	20:10	Final

== Records ==
Prior to this competition, the existing world, Asian and Games records were as follows.

World Record	Barbora Špotáková (CZE)	72.28	Stuttgart, Germany	13 September 2008
Asian Record	Lü Huihui (CHN)	65.62	Zhaoqing, China	27 April 2013
Games Record	Yuki Ebihara (JPN)	61.56	Guangzhou, China	25 November 2010

== Results ==
Legend

- DNS — Did not start

Rank	Athlete	Attempt						Result	Notes
Rank	Athlete	1	2	3	4	5	6	Result	Notes
1st place, gold medalist(s)	Zhang Li (CHN)	53.76	58.84	58.51	62.42	63.98	65.47	65.47	GR
2nd place, silver medalist(s)	Li Lingwei (CHN)	58.74	58.89	57.14	61.07	61.43	59.10	61.43	
3rd place, bronze medalist(s)	Annu Rani (IND)	59.53	52.76	53.91	53.71	X	54.34	59.53	
4	Yuki Ebihara (JPN)	57.13	58.72	57.71	54.58	X	55.34	58.72	
5	Nadeeka Lakmali (SRI)	55.56	54.63	55.59	57.71	52.37	54.21	57.71	
6	Gim Gyeong-ae (KOR)	54.91	56.07	55.43	50.74	55.91	52.03	56.07	
7	Natta Nachan (THA)	50.53	49.39	X	47.38	X	52.16	52.16	
8	Saowalak Pettong (THA)	43.80	X	X	X	44.71	46.45	46.45	
—	Anastasiya Svechnikova (UZB)							DNS	
