= Nie Jingjing =

Chinese racewalker

Personal information
- Born: 1 March 1988 (age 38)

Sport
- Country: China
- Sport: Track and field
- Updated on 29 August 2015

Nie Jingjing (Chinese: 聂晶晶; born 1 March 1988) is a female racewalker from China. She came in fourth place in the Women's 20 kilometres walk event at the 2014 Asian Games in Incheon, South Korea and also competed in the Women's 20 kilometres walk event at the 2015 World Championships in Athletics in Beijing, China.

== See also ==
- China at the 2015 World Championships in Athletics
