= Shooting at the 2014 Asian Games – Men's 25 metre rapid fire pistol =

Men's 25 metre rapid fire pistol at the 2014 Asian Games
- Venue: Ongnyeon International Shooting Range
- Dates: 23–24 September 2014
- Competitors: 24 from 12 nations

Medalists
| gold medal | Kim Jun-hong | South Korea |
| silver medal | Zhang Jian | China |
| bronze medal | Hu Haozhe | China |

The men's 25 metre rapid fire pistol competition at the 2014 Asian Games in Incheon, South Korea was held on 23 and 24 September at the Ongnyeon International Shooting Range.

== Schedule ==
All times are Korea Standard Time (UTC+09:00)

| Date | Time | Event |
|---|---|---|
| Tuesday, 23 September 2014 | 09:00 | Qualification stage 1 |
| Wednesday, 24 September 2014 | 09:00 | Qualification stage 2 |
| Wednesday, 24 September 2014 | 14:30 | Final |

== Records ==
Prior to this competition, the existing world, Asian and Games records were as follows.

Qualification
| World Record | Christian Reitz (GER) | 593 | Osijek, Croatia | 30 July 2013 |
| Asian Record | Kim Jun-hong (KOR) | 593 | Beijing, China | 6 July 2014 |
| Games Record | Li Yuehong (CHN); Hà Minh Thành (VIE) | 583 | Guangzhou, China | 15 November 2010 |
Final
| World Record | Riccardo Mazzetti (ITA) | 35 | Beijing, China | 6 July 2014 |
| Asian Record | Teruyoshi Akiyama (JPN) | 34 | Munich, Germany | 25 May 2012 |
| Games Record | — | — | — | — |

== Results ==
=== Qualification ===
| Rank | Athlete | Stage 1 | | | Stage 2 | | | Total | Xs | Notes |
| Rank | Athlete | 8 | 6 | 4 | 8 | 6 | 4 | Total | Xs | Notes |
|---|---|---|---|---|---|---|---|---|---|---|
| 1 | Li Yuehong (CHN) | 98 | 100 | 97 | 98 | 98 | 95 | 586 | 33 | GR |
| 2 | Song Jong-ho (KOR) | 98 | 96 | 97 | 99 | 99 | 95 | 584 | 14 | |
| 3 | Jang Dae-kyu (KOR) | 97 | 99 | 97 | 98 | 96 | 95 | 582 | 16 | |
| 4 | Kim Jun-hong (KOR) | 99 | 98 | 94 | 99 | 95 | 96 | 581 | 15 | |
| 5 | Zhang Jian (CHN) | 98 | 98 | 95 | 98 | 95 | 97 | 581 | 14 | |
| 6 | Hu Haozhe (CHN) | 96 | 97 | 97 | 98 | 97 | 94 | 579 | 20 | |
| 7 | Harpreet Singh (IND) | 98 | 99 | 93 | 98 | 97 | 93 | 578 | 16 | |
| 8 | Teruyoshi Akiyama (JPN) | 97 | 99 | 92 | 97 | 96 | 95 | 576 | 17 | |
| 9 | Hà Minh Thành (VIE) | 98 | 97 | 92 | 99 | 96 | 94 | 576 | 15 | |
| 10 | Said Al-Hashmi (OMA) | 97 | 97 | 97 | 95 | 96 | 93 | 575 | 20 | |
| 11 | Oleg Engachev (QAT) | 100 | 97 | 90 | 98 | 96 | 89 | 570 | 15 | |
| 12 | Gurpreet Singh (IND) | 97 | 98 | 89 | 98 | 97 | 91 | 570 | 13 | |
| 13 | Sergey Vokhmyanin (KAZ) | 97 | 93 | 93 | 95 | 97 | 94 | 569 | 9 | |
| 14 | Aekkata Attanon (THA) | 99 | 92 | 94 | 96 | 95 | 89 | 565 | 16 | |
| 15 | Kiều Thanh Tú (VIE) | 96 | 97 | 94 | 95 | 94 | 89 | 565 | 13 | |
| 16 | Bùi Quang Nam (VIE) | 97 | 94 | 85 | 98 | 92 | 97 | 563 | 13 | |
| 17 | Vorapol Kulchairattana (THA) | 97 | 95 | 83 | 94 | 95 | 97 | 561 | 12 | |
| 18 | Sriyanon Karndee (THA) | 98 | 92 | 90 | 93 | 95 | 92 | 560 | 10 | |
| 19 | Ghulam Mustafa Bashir (PAK) | 97 | 97 | 86 | 96 | 95 | 89 | 560 | 7 | |
| 20 | Pemba Tamang (IND) | 99 | 93 | 85 | 91 | 94 | 94 | 556 | 10 | |
| 21 | Azizjon Mukhamedrakhimov (QAT) | 94 | 97 | 84 | 94 | 95 | 85 | 549 | 6 | |
| 22 | Riaz Khan (QAT) | 96 | 92 | 89 | 91 | 94 | 80 | 542 | 13 | |
| 23 | Chio Hong Chi (MAC) | 92 | 86 | 83 | 88 | 89 | 80 | 518 | 3 | |
| 24 | Ismaeel Shafeeq (MDV) | 92 | 85 | 71 | 86 | 81 | 56 | 471 | 3 | |

=== Final ===
| Rank | Athlete | 1st stage | | | 2nd stage – Elimination | | | | | S-off | Notes |
| Rank | Athlete | 1 | 2 | 3 | 1 | 2 | 3 | 4 | 5 | S-off | Notes |
|---|---|---|---|---|---|---|---|---|---|---|---|
| 1st place, gold medalist(s) | Kim Jun-hong (KOR) | 4 | 7 | 11 | 15 | 19 | 24 | 28 | 31 | | GR |
| 2nd place, silver medalist(s) | Zhang Jian (CHN) | 5 | 9 | 13 | 17 | 20 | 23 | 27 | 30 | | |
| 3rd place, bronze medalist(s) | Hu Haozhe (CHN) | 5 | 9 | 12 | 15 | 19 | 23 | 25 | | | |
| 4 | Li Yuehong (CHN) | 4 | 8 | 11 | 14 | 18 | 22 | | | | |
| 5 | Jang Dae-kyu (KOR) | 4 | 9 | 13 | 16 | 18 | | | | SO | |
| 6 | Song Jong-ho (KOR) | 3 | 7 | 10 | 14 | | | | | SO | |
