= Boxing at the 2014 Asian Games – Women's 60 kg =

Boxing competitions

Women's 60 kg at the 2014 Asian Games
- Venue: Seonhak Gymnasium
- Date: 27 September – 1 October 2014
- Competitors: 14 from 14 nations

Medalists
| gold medal | Yin Junhua | China |
| silver medal | Park Jin-a | South Korea |
| bronze medal | Laishram Sarita Devi | India |
| bronze medal | Lừu Thị Duyên | Vietnam |

The women's lightweight (60 kilograms) event at the 2014 Asian Games took place from 27 September to 1 October 2014 at Seonhak Gymnasium, Incheon, South Korea.

Indian boxer Laishram Sarita Devi lost a highly controversial semifinal bout against eventual silver medalist Park Jin-a of South Korea. Despite what many believed was a better performance by Sarita Devi, all three ringside judges ruled in favor of her opponent, leading to a 0–3 decision. The decision, which drew huge criticism, left Sarita Devi in a state of shock and she was seen weeping inconsolably. Sarita Devi stunned officials and spectators by refusing to accept the bronze medal during the medal ceremony. Devi initially took her bronze medal and placed it around Park Jin-a's neck. After reluctantly receiving her medal back from Park Jin-a, Devi left the medal on the podium after the conclusion of the ceremony.

== Schedule ==
All times are Korea Standard Time (UTC+09:00)

| Date | Time | Event |
|---|---|---|
| Saturday, 27 September 2014 | 14:00 | Preliminaries |
| Sunday, 28 September 2014 | 14:00 | Quarterfinals |
| Tuesday, 30 September 2014 | 14:00 | Semifinals |
| Wednesday, 1 October 2014 | 15:00 | Final |

== Results ==
Legend

- TKO — Won by technical knockout

Preliminaries
Chen Chia-ling (TPE) | 0
Oyuungereliin Suvd-Erdene (MGL) | 3
Ri Chung-son (PRK) | 0
Laishram Sarita Devi (IND) | 3
Muhayyohon Esonboyeva (UZB) | 0
Lừu Thị Duyên (VIE) | 3
Mavzuna Chorieva (TJK) | TKO
Ayako Minowa (JPN)
Nesthy Petecio (PHI) | 3
Gulzhaina Ubbiniyazova (KAZ) | 0
Yin Junhua (CHN) | 3
Tassamalee Thongjan (THA) | 0

Quarterfinals
Park Jin-a (KOR) | TKO
Saraswati Rana Magar (NEP)
Oyuungereliin Suvd-Erdene (MGL) | 0
Laishram Sarita Devi (IND) | 3
Lừu Thị Duyên (VIE) | 2
Mavzuna Chorieva (TJK) | 1
Nesthy Petecio (PHI) | 0
Yin Junhua (CHN) | 3

Semifinals
Park Jin-a (KOR) | 3
Laishram Sarita Devi (IND) | 0
Lừu Thị Duyên (VIE) | 0
Yin Junhua (CHN) | 3

Final
Park Jin-a (KOR) | 0
Yin Junhua (CHN) | 2
