= Sailing at the 2014 Asian Games – Hobie 16 =

Open Hobie 16 at the 2014 Asian Games
- Venue: Wangsan Marina
- Date: 24–30 September 2014
- Competitors: 18 from 9 nations

Medalists
gold medal	Kim Keun-soo; Song Min-jae	South Korea
silver medal	Damrongsak Vongtim; Kitsada Vongtim	Thailand
bronze medal	Tong Yui Shing; Tong Kit Fong	Hong Kong

The open Hobie 16 competition at the 2014 Asian Games in Incheon was held from 24 to 30 September 2014.

== Schedule ==
All times are Korea Standard Time (UTC+09:00)

Date	Time	Event
Wednesday, 24 September 2014	12:00	Race 1
Wednesday, 24 September 2014	12:00	Race 2
Wednesday, 24 September 2014	12:00	Race 3
Thursday, 25 September 2014	11:00	Race 4
Thursday, 25 September 2014	11:00	Race 5
Thursday, 25 September 2014	11:00	Race 6
Friday, 26 September 2014	11:00	Race 7
Friday, 26 September 2014	11:00	Race 8
Saturday, 27 September 2014	11:00	Race 9
Saturday, 27 September 2014	11:00	Race 10
Tuesday, 30 September 2014	11:00	Race 11
Tuesday, 30 September 2014	11:00	Race 12

== Results ==
Legend

- DNC — Did not come to the starting area
- DSQ — Disqualification
- OCS — On course side

Rank	Team	Race												Total
Rank	Team	1	2	3	4	5	6	7	8	9	10	11	12	Total
1st place, gold medalist(s)	South Korea (KOR); Kim Keun-soo; Song Min-jae	1	1	3	~~(9)~~	1	1	1	1	2	3	2	2	18
2nd place, silver medalist(s)	Thailand (THA); Damrongsak Vongtim; Kitsada Vongtim	2	~~(10)~~; OCS	1	1	3	2	10; DSQ	2	1	1	1	1	25
3rd place, bronze medalist(s)	Hong Kong (HKG); Tong Yui Shing; Tong Kit Fong	~~(3)~~	2	2	2	2	3	2	3	3	2	3	3	27
4	Chinese Taipei (TPE); Chang Yao-hsien; Hsu Chin-chih	5	3	5	3	5	5	6	~~(7)~~	5	4	5	5	51
5	India (IND); Brijraj Verma; Pankaj Kumar	4	4	4	4	6	~~(7)~~	4	6	6	5	6	7	56
6	Kazakhstan (KAZ); Galymzhan Darigul; Anuar Kaldykozhayev	~~(10)~~; OCS	10; OCS	7	7	4	4	3	4	4	7	4	4	58
7	Oman (OMA); Akram Al-Wahaibi; Ahmed Al-Balushi	6	~~(10)~~; DSQ	6	5	7	6	5	5	7	6	7	6	66
8	Kuwait (KUW); Nayef Al-Hadah; Mohammad Bastaki	7	5	8	8	9	9	8	9	9	9	~~(10)~~; DNC	10; DNC	91
9	Qatar (QAT); Hassan Al-Baker; Mohammed Al-Suwaidi	~~(10)~~; OCS	10; OCS	10; OCS	6	8	8	7	8	8	8	10; DNC	10; DNC	93
