= Lü Xiuzhi =

Chinese racewalker (born 1993)

Personal information
- Born: 26 October 1993 (age 32) Anhui, China
- Height: 1.56 m (5 ft 1 in)
- Weight: 45 kg (99 lb)

Sport
- Country: China
- Sport: Athletics
- Event: Racewalking
Medal record
Women's athletics
Representing China
Olympic Games
Bronze medal – third place	2016 Rio de Janeiro	20 km walk
Bronze medal – third place	2012 London	20 km walk
World Championships
Silver medal – second place	2015 Beijing	20 km walk
Asian Games
Gold medal – first place	2014 Incheon	20 km walk

Lü Xiuzhi (Chinese: 吕秀芝; pinyin: lǚ xìu zhī; born 26 October 1993 in Shexian, Anhui) is a Chinese female race walker specializing in 20 kilometers racewalking. Lü is two bronze medalist at the 2012 Summer Olympics and at the 2016 Summer Olympics she is also the silver medalist at the Beijing 2015 IAAF World Championships.
