= Pranati Nayak =

Indian artistic gymnast (born 1995)

- Born: 6 April 1995 (age 31) Jhargram, West Bengal, India
- Height: 144 cm (4 ft 9 in)

Gymnastics career
- Discipline: Women's artistic gymnastics
- Head coach: Minara Begum
Medal record
Representing India
Women's artistic gymnastics
Asian Championships
Bronze medal – third place	2019 Ulaanbaatar	Vault
Bronze medal – third place	2022 Doha	Vault
Bronze medal – third place	2025 Jecheon	Vault
FIG World Cup
Event	1st	2nd	3rd
Apparatus World Cup	0	0	2
World Challenge Cup	0	1	0
Total	0	1	2

Pranati Nayak (Odia: ପ୍ରଣତି ନାୟକ; born 6 April 1995) is an Indian artistic gymnast. She is the 2019 Asian Championships vault bronze medalist. She is the third Indian gymnast to win an international medal on the vault, after Dipa Karmakar and Aruna Reddy. She represented India at the 2020 Summer Olympics and is only the second Indian female gymnast to qualify for the Olympic Games. She is also the 2019 Indian all-around champion. She represented India at the 2014 Commonwealth Games and at the 2018 Commonwealth Games and at the 2014 and 2018 Asian Games. She also competed at the 2014, 2017, and 2019 World Championships.

== Early and personal life ==
Nayak was born in Karkai, Pingla, West Midnapore district. Her father worked as a state transport bus driver in West Bengal until 2017 when he took an office job, and her mother is a housewife. She began gymnastics when she was six years old. She moved to Odisha to train in 2003, and her coach Minara Begum paid for her living expenses. She speaks Odia, Bengali, English, and Hindi.

== Career ==
Nayak's first major international competition was the 2014 Commonwealth Games. She competed in the team competition with Aruna Reddy, Pranati Das, Rucha Divekar, and Dipa Karmakar, and they placed eleventh. The same team in addition to Payel Bhattacharjee represented India at the 2014 Asian Games and placed eighth in the team event. Individually, Nayak qualified for the all-around final and finished twentieth with a total score of 43.800. The same Indian team competed again at the 2014 World Championships and finished last out of the thirty-eight teams.

Nayak competed at the 2017 Asian Championships where she finished fourteenth in the all-around. She qualified for the vault event final and finished fourth and the balance beam event final and finished fifth. She then competed at the 2017 World Championships and finished sixty-eighth in the all-around during the qualification round.

Nayak qualified for the vault final at the 2018 Melbourne World Cup and finished sixth. She then represented India at the 2018 Commonwealth Games alongside Aruna Reddy and Pranati Das where they finished seventh in the team competition. Individually, Nayak qualified for the vault event final where she finished eighth. Nayak, Reddy, and Das were joined by Mandira Chowdhury and Dipa Karmakar at the 2018 Asian Games where they placed seventh in the team final. Nayak qualified for the vault final and placed eighth.

Nayak won the gold medal in the all-around at the 2019 Indian Championships. At the 2019 Asian Championships, she finished thirteenth in the all-around. She won the bronze medal on the vault with an average score of 13.384. She was the third Indian gymnast to win a vault medal in a major international competition after Dipa Karmakar at the 2014 Commonwealth Games and Aruna Reddy at the 2018 Melbourne World Cup. At the 2019 World Championships, Nayak missed the all-around placement cutoff for the 2020 Olympic Games by less than three points.

Nayak earned a continental quota spot to the 2020 Summer Olympics alongside Sri Lanka’s Milka Gehani after the cancellation of the 2021 Asian Championships. She was only the second female gymnast to represent India at the Olympics, after Dipa Karmakar. She was only able to train for two months prior to the Olympics due her gym being closed for a year during the COVID-19 pandemic in India. At the Olympics, she finished seventy-ninth in the all-around with a total score of 42.565 during the qualification round. She did not qualify for any of the finals.

== Competitive history ==
Year	Event	Team	AA	VT	UB	BB	FX
2014
2014	Commonwealth Games	11					
2014	Asian Games	8	20				
2014	World Championships	38					
2017
2017	Asian Championships		14	4		5	
2017	World Championships		68				
2018	Melbourne World Cup			6			
2018	Commonwealth Games	7		8			
2018	Asian Games	7		8			
2019	Indian Championships		1st place, gold medalist(s)				
2019	Asian Championships		13	3rd place, bronze medalist(s)			
2019	World Championships		127				
2021
2021	Olympic Games		79				
2022
2022	Asian Championships	7	21	3rd place, bronze medalist(s)			
2022	Commonwealth Games	9		5			
2022	World Championships			26			
2023
2023	Asian Games			8			
2024	Cairo World Cup			3rd place, bronze medalist(s)			
2025	Antalya World Cup			3rd place, bronze medalist(s)			
2025	Asian Championships			3rd place, bronze medalist(s)			
2025	World Championships						
2026	Tashkent World Challenge Cup			2nd place, silver medalist(s)			
2026	Asian Championships	11		7			
2026	Commonwealth Games	9		R3			
2026	Asian Games			6			

== See also ==
- Gymnastics in India
