= Jeon Yeong-eun =

South Korean race walker

Personal information
- Born: 24 May 1988 (age 38) Daejeon, South Korea

Sport
- Country: South Korea
- Sport: Athletics
- Event: Racewalking
Medal record
Women's athletics
Representing South Korea
Asian Games
Bronze medal – third place	2014 Incheon	20 km walk
- Updated on 29 August 2015

Jeon Yeong-Eun (Korean: 전영은, Korean pronunciation: [tɕʌ.njʌŋ.ɯn] or [tɕʌn] [jʌŋ.ɯn]; born 24 May 1988 in Daejeon) is a South Korean race walker. She competed in the 20 km kilometres event at the 2012 Summer Olympics and 2016 Summer Olympics. She also competed in the Women's 20 kilometres walk event at the 2015 World Championships in Athletics in Beijing, China, as well as the same event at the 2011 World Championships on home soil in Daegu, and the 2013 World Championships in Moscow.
