= Kim Un-hyang (gymnast) =

North Korean artistic gymnast (born 1990)

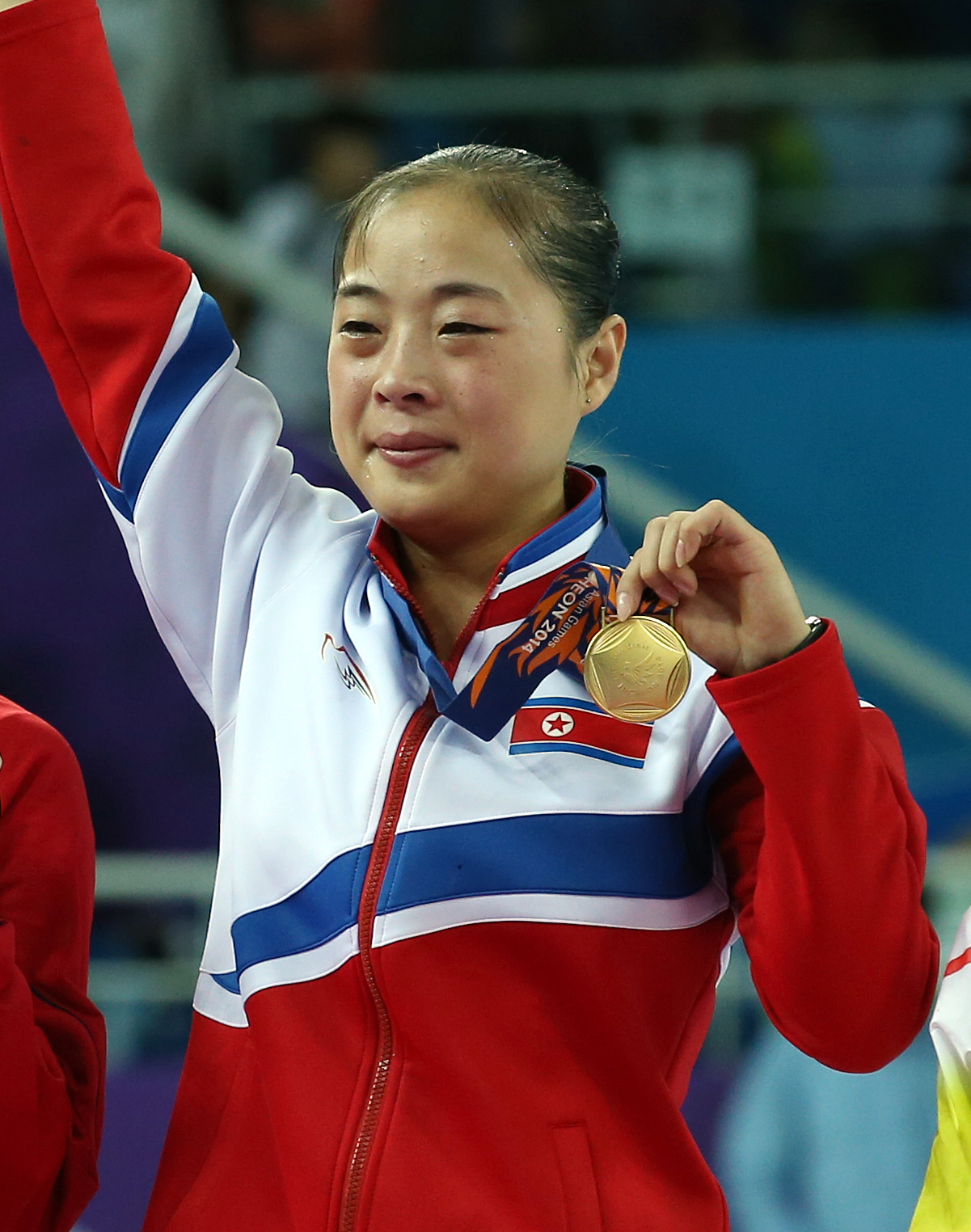
- Kim at the 2014 Asian Games

Personal information
- Born: 18 October 1990 (age 35) Pyongyang, North Korea
- Height: 1.58 m (5 ft 2 in)

Gymnastics career
- Discipline: Women's artistic gymnastics
- Country represented: North Korea
- Club: Kigwancha Sports Club
Medal record
Representing North Korea
Asian Games
Gold medal – first place	2014 Incheon	Balance beam
Silver medal – second place	2014 Incheon	Team
Disqualified	2006 Doha	Team
Asian Championships
Silver medal – second place	2006 Surat	Team
Silver medal – second place	2008 Doha	All-around
Silver medal – second place	2008 Doha	Uneven bars
Silver medal – second place	2008 Doha	Floor exercise
Silver medal – second place	2012 Putian	Team
Silver medal – second place	2012 Putian	Balance beam
Bronze medal – third place	2006 Surat	Balance beam
Bronze medal – third place	2008 Doha	Uneven bars
Bronze medal – third place	2008 Doha	Balance beam
East Asian Games
Bronze medal – third place	2013 Tianjin	Team
Bronze medal – third place	2013 Tianjin	All-around
Summer Universiade
Bronze medal – third place	2009 Belgrade	All-around
Disqualified	2009 Belgrade	Team

- Kim Un-hyang
- Hangul: 김은향
- RR: Gim Eunhyang
- MR: Kim Ŭnhyang

Kim Un-hyang (Korean: 김은향; born 18 October 1990) is a North Korean former artistic gymnast. She is the 2014 Asian Games balance beam champion and team silver medalist. At the 2008 Asian Championships, she won silver medals in the all-around, uneven bars, and floor exercise. She competed at four World Championships and finished fourth on the balance beam at the 2009 World Championships.

== Gymnastics career ==
=== 2006 ===
Kim began gymnastics in 2000 and made her international debut for the North Korean national team in 2006. She helped the team win the silver medal behind China at the 2006 Asian Championships, and she won a bronze medal on the balance beam. She then competed with the North Korean team that finished 13th at the 2006 World Championships. At the 2006 Asian Games, Kim initially won a silver medal in the team event, but the medal was stripped after the International Gymnastics Federation discovered that Cha Yong-hwa's age was falsified. Individually, she advanced to the balance beam final and finished sixth, and she placed fourth in the floor exercise final.

=== 2007–2009 ===
Kim helped North Korea finish 13th at the 2007 World Championships. At the 2008 Asian Championships, she won silver medals in the all-around, uneven bars and floor exercise, all behind Kōko Tsurumi. She also won a bronze medal on the balance beam. She won the all-around bronze medal at the 2009 Summer Universiade behind Chinese gymnasts Jiang Yuyuan and He Ning. She also initially won a bronze medal in the team event, but these results were disqualified as Cha was on the team. She competed at the 2009 World Championships and finished fourth in the balance beam final, only one tenth of a point away from the bronze medal.

=== 2010–2012 ===
Kim won the silver medal on the balance beam at the 2010 Moscow World Cup. She did not compete in any international competitions from November 2010 to October 2012 because the North Korean team was banned for repeated age falsifications. In November 2012, she competed with the North Korean team that won a silver medal at the 2012 Asian Championships, and she won the balance beam silver medal behind Shang Chunsong.

=== 2013–2015 ===
Kim helped North Korea finish fifth in the team event at the 2013 Summer Universiade. At the 2013 East Asian Games, she helped North Korea win the team bronze medal, and she won the bronze medal in the all-around.

Kim won the silver medal on the balance beam behind Phan Thị Hà Thanh at the 2014 Osijek World Challenge Cup. She then represented North Korea at the 2014 Asian Games and helped the team win the silver medal behind China. She then won the gold medal in the balance beam final. At the 2014 World Championships, she helped the North Korean team finish 23rd, and she placed 60th in the all-around during the qualifications.

Kim won the balance beam silver medal behind Phan at the 2015 Varna World Challenge Cup. This was the final international competition of her career.
