= Neha Aggarwal =

Indian table tennis player

Neha Aggarwal Sharma OLY
Personal information
- Nationality: India
- Born: 11 January 1990 (age 36) India
- Height: 1.70 m (5 ft 7 in)
- Weight: 67 kg (148 lb)

Sport
- Sport: Table tennis
- Playing style: Right-handed, shakehand

Neha Aggarwal Sharma (born 11 January 1990) is an Indian table tennis player who participated in the 2008 Summer Olympics in Beijing, the only woman from India to feature in that discipline. Aggarwal earned her position at the Olympics by defeating Poulomi Ghatak and Mouma Das, who had been favored to win. The Delhi girl, who did her schooling from Delhi Public School, R. K. Puram and her college from St. Stephen's College, Delhi, was the winner of Junior National Table Tennis Championship held at Ahmedabad and Kolkata. She did not receive a medal, having been eliminated after losing to Chinese born Australian Jiang Fang Lay. She has a Masters in Sports Management from Columbia University, New York.

== See also ==
- Indian Squad for 2008 Olympics
