= Khushbir Kaur =

Indian racewalker

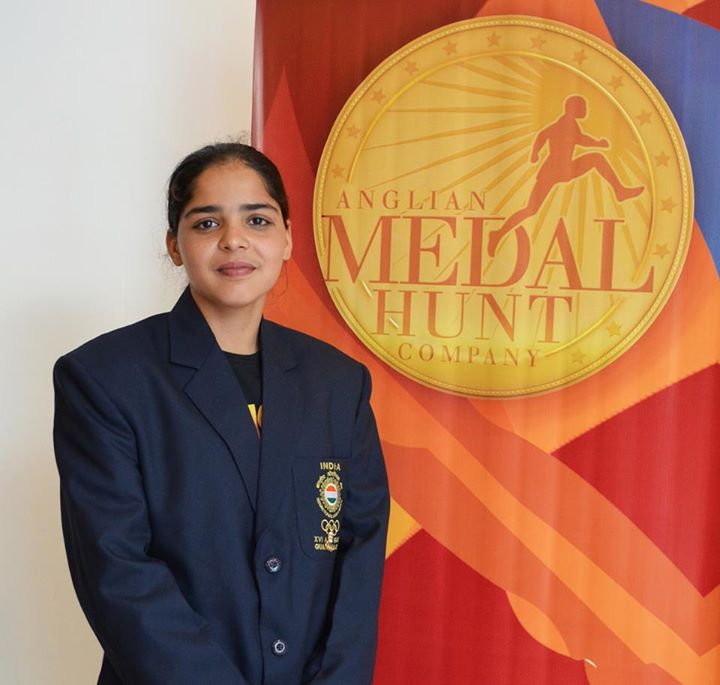

Personal information
- Nationality: Indian
- Born: 9 July 1993 (age 32) Punjab, India
- Education: Guru Nanak Dev University, Amritsar
- Occupation(s): Athlete, Punjab Police

Sport
- Country: India
- Sport: Athletics
- Event: Racewalking

Achievements and titles
- Personal best(s): 5 km walk: 25:30.27 (Singapore 2010); 10 km walk: 49:21.21 (Bengaluru 2010); 20 km walk: 1:33:07 (Incheon 2014)
Medal record
Women's athletics
Representing India
Asian Games
Silver medal – second place	2014 Incheon	20 km walk
Asian Junior Championships
Bronze medal – third place	2012 Colombo	10 km walk

Khushbir Kaur (born 9 July 1993) is an Indian athlete, a 20-kilometre racewalker. She first came into limelight after winning bronze in the 10,000-metre (6.2 mi) walk race at the 2012 Asian Junior Athletics Championships held at Colombo, Sri Lanka. She participated in the 2013 World Championships in the 20 km walk category. She clocked 1:34:28 and finished 39th. At the 2014 Asian walking championships in Japan, she came second with a timing of 1:33:07 and bettered her own national record of 1:33:37. In the same year, she became the first Indian woman to win a silver at the Asian Games. She received the Arjuna Award in 2017 after her consecutive victories in International sports events.

Khushbir Kaur is supported by Anglian Medal-Hunt Company.

== Early life ==
Kaur hails from Rasulpur Kalan, a village near Amritsar. Her family has roots in the farming community. Her mother Jasbir Kaur encouraged her to take up sports professionally. She lost her father at the age of six and was raised by her mother.

In 2008, she completed her race barefoot as she could not afford shoes Furthermore, she notched up junior national records in the 5 km and 10 km event. After a string of successful performances in the national junior circuit, she performed well in the international circuit – finishing second in the Youth Asian Games and third in the Junior Asian Games (2012). She had a strong 5th-place performance in the senior Walking Asian Championship in Japan.

She was guided by her coach Baldev Singh during her initial years of training. Later, coaches Alexander Artsybashev and Ajay Rati guided her in subsequent competitions.

== 2013 Moscow World Championship ==
Kaur bettered her own personal best and the national record in the Women's 20 km Walk during the Moscow World Championship (2013), clocking a time of 1:34:28. She finished 39th during the event.

== 2014 Asian Games, Incheon (PRK) ==
Kaur became the first Indian woman to clinch a 20 km Race Walk silver medal in the Asian Games by bettering her personal best and setting a new national record in the process. The 21-year-old from Amritsar clocked 1:33:07 to improve on her previous personal best of 1:33:37, which was also the national record, to finish second at the Marathon Course.

== 2016 Rio Olympics ==
In the 2016 Olympics, she secured 54th position in 20 km race walk and thus gouged a mark in the prestigious international sports championship. She took 1 hour, 40 minutes and 30 seconds to complete the distance of the race which was far away from her previous national records.

== 2018 Commonwealth Games ==
In the 21st Commonwealth Games, held in Australia, she finished fourth in the women's 20 kilometer racewalk event where she clocked the time of 1 hour, 39 minutes and 21 seconds.
