= Prabagaran =

Indian volleyball player (born 1988)

Prabhagaran S

Personal information
- Full name: Prabhagaran Sinnadhu
- Born: 3 November 1988 (age 37); Manaveli, Ariyankuppam, Puducherry, India
- Height: 193 cm (6 ft 4 in)
- Weight: 76 kg (168 lb)

Volleyball information
- Current club: ICF
- Number: 13

Career
Teams
	Indian Railways

National team
2013 - Present	India

Prabhagaran S, commonly known as Prabha, is a member of India's men's national volleyball team. He wears jersey #13. He currently plays for Kochi Blue Spikers in Pro Volleyball League.
