= Asha Roy =

Indian sprinter

Personal information
- Born: 5 January 1990 (age 36) Ghanshyampur, Hooghly, West Bengal, India

Sport
- Sport: Track and field
- Event: Sprints

Achievements and titles
- Personal bests: 100 m: 11.72 (Lucknow 2013); 200 m: 23.59 (Chennai 2013)
Medal record
Representing India
Women's athletics
Asian Championships
Silver medal – second place	2013 Pune	200 m

Asha Roy (born 5 January 1990) is an Indian professional sprinter who won the silver medal for 200m in the Asian Track and Field at the 20th Asian Athletics Championships in Pune on 7 July 2013. Roy clocked 11.85 seconds in a 100-meter dash at the 51st National Open Athletics Championships, held at the Yuva Bharti Krirangan, Kolkata in 2011. Roy's record was just short of the national record of 11.38 seconds, which was set by Rachita Mistry in Thiruvananthapuram in 2000. Roy also ran the fastest 200-meter dash, clocking the tape at 24.36 seconds and anchored Bengal's 4 × 100 m relay team, which won the silver with a timing of 47.49 seconds at the Championships.

== Early life ==
Roy was born in Ghanshyampur, a village in the Hooghly district of the Indian State of West Bengal, on 5 January 1990, to Bholanath Roy, a door-to-door vegetable-seller, and Bulu Roy, a homemaker. Roy is the third among four daughters of Bholanath Roy and Bulu Roy. The Roy family lives in abject poverty and the sprinter usually was only able to eat two meals a day, with little attention to the kind of nutrition the top athletes need.

Roy studied for her bachelor's degree at the Sriampore College of the Hooghly district. Roy was promised a job and monetary assistance after her performance at the National Open Meet by both, the Indian Railways and the State Government of West Bengal. However, it took Roy almost a year to get a job. Roy was approached by a few Kolkata-based companies to join them as a brand ambassador, but all the opportunities ended in nought. Roy had almost decided to quit the sport, between January 2011 and February 2012, when finally an opportunity came her way. Roy joined South Eastern Railways office in February 2012.

== Career ==
Roy trained under a coach Probir Chandra, who had first spotted Roy when she finished first at a school meet as a student of the third grade. Coach Chandra approached Roy's father to discuss her talent and took the full responsibility for her training. Roy became a member of the Bengal Athletic Team when she was in the fifth grade and she participated in the Nationals when she was in the sixth grade.

=== 2004-2006: School Games and Junior Nationals ===
Roy won four gold medals and was named the best athlete in the school games in 2004. Roy achieved the second position in the long jump as well as in the 100-meter dash at the Junior Nationals in 2006.

=== 2009: Indo-Bangla International Meet ===
Roy won the gold medal for the 100-meter dash at the Indo-Bangla International Meet.

=== 2010: University Meet ===
Roy won a silver medal at the University Meet.

=== 2011: 51st National Open Athletics Championships ===
Roy participated in the 100-meter, 200-meter, and 4X100-meter Relay races at the 51st National Open Athletics Championships, hosted at the Yuva Bharti Krirangan, Kolkata. She bagged the gold medal for the 100-meter race, finishing in 11.85 seconds, and for the 200-meter race, finishing in 24.36 seconds. Roy also anchored the Bengal's 4 × 100 m relay team, bagging the silver medal with a timing of 47.49 seconds at the Championships. It was after her performance at the Open National Championship that her career took off.

=== 2013: Indian Grand Prix championship and 20th Asian Athletics Championships ===
Roy made her comeback by winning the gold medal for the 200-meter race in the second Indian Grand Prix Championship in Patiala. Roy also was able to improve her previous best of 24.33 seconds in the 200-meter race and set a new meet record, timing 24.23 seconds.

Roy went on to win the silver medal for 200m in the Asian Track and Field at the 20th Asian Athletics Championships in Pune on 7 July 2013. The West Bengal Athletic Association felicitated Roy on 17 July 2013 and awarded her with Rs. 50,000 and gifts from the State association.

=== 2015: Struggles and Injuries ===
Under the guidance of the Chief national coach in the sprinting, Tarun Saha, Asha Roy had been training to participate in Rio Olympics in the 200-meter race and represent the Railways. Roy was in the national preparatory camp for the Rio Olympics in Thiruvananthapuram when her waist injury became worse and she could no longer continue to train. Roy's condition began deteriorating after she began training at the Kolkata SAL campus, leading to her inability to perform at the Rio Olympics.
