= Rucha Divekar =

Indian artistic gymnast

Rucha Sachin Divekar
- Born: 10 February 1995 (age 31)

Gymnastics career
- Discipline: Women's artistic gymnastics
- Country represented: India; (2013–2014)

Rucha Sachin Divekar (born 10 February 1995) is an Indian former artistic gymnast. She competed at the 2013 and 2014 World Championships, and she represented India at the 2014 Commonwealth Games and at the 2014 Asian Games.

== Gymnastics career ==
Divekar competed on the vault, balance beam, and floor exercise at the 2013 World Championships but did not advance into any finals. Her best result was on the vault, where she placed 46th in the qualification round with an average score of 12.833. She then represented India at the 2014 Commonwealth Games alongside Aruna Reddy, Pranati Das, Pranati Nayak, and Dipa Karmakar. She contributed on the uneven bars to help the team place eleventh out of the fourteen teams. Her score of 7.666 placed 50th in the uneven bars qualifications and did not advance to the final. The same team in addition to Payel Bhattacharjee represented India at the 2014 Asian Games and placed eighth. Divekar competed on the balance beam and floor exercise, scoring 10.150 and 10.200, respectively. However, both of her scores were the lowest on the team and did not count towards the team total score. She also did not advance into either apparatus final, as she placed 45th and 48th in the qualifications. The same Indian team competed again at the 2014 World Championships and finished last out of the thirty-eight teams. Divekar competed on all four apparatus and finished with an all-around total score of 40.365, placing 168th in the all-around qualifications. She did not advance into any apparatus finals.
