= Dilnoza Abdusalimova =

Uzbekistani artistic gymnast (born 1995)

- Born: 6 March 1995 (age 31)

Gymnastics career
- Discipline: Women's artistic gymnastics
- Country represented: Uzbekistan; (2010–2016)

Dilnoza Abdusalimova (born 6 March 1995) is an Uzbekistani former artistic gymnast. She competed at the Artistic Gymnastics World Championships four times (2011, 2013–2015).

== Gymnastics career ==
Abdusalimova won a bronze medal on the balance beam at the 2010 Junior Asian Championships and qualified to represent Uzbekistan at the 2010 Summer Youth Olympics. There, she advanced into the all-around final, ultimately finishing 14th. She became age-eligible for senior international competitions in 2011 and competed at her first World Championships that year, finishing 97th in the all-around qualifications.

At the 2013 Cottbus World Challenge Cup, Abdusalimova finished eighth in the balance beam final. She competed at the 2013 World Championships and finished 48th in the qualification round. She did not advance into any individual finals. She represented Uzbekistan at the 2014 Asian Games and helped the team place fifth. Individually, she advanced into the all-around final and finished fifth, and she finished sixth in the vault final. At the 2014 World Championships, she finished 59th in the all-around qualifications.

Abdusalimova finished seventh in the vault final at the 2015 Varna World Challenge Cup. At the 2015 Summer Universiade, she then advanced into the all-around final and finished tenth. She also advanced into the balance beam final, where she finished fourth– 0.100 points away from the bronze medal. She placed fifth in the all-around at the 2015 Asian Championships and also finished fourth in both the vault and floor exercise finals. She then competed at the 2015 World Championships and finished 115th in the all-around during the qualification round.

At the 2016 Baku World Challenge Cup, Abdusalimova finished sixth on the vault, fourth on the uneven bars, fifth on the balance beam with a fall, and sixth on the floor exercise. She then finished seventh on the balance beam at the Cottbus World Challenge Cup after falling in the final. This was the final international competition of her career.
