= Aruna Reddy =

Indian artistic gymnast (born 1995)

- Full name: Budda Aruna Reddy
- Born: 25 December 1995 (age 30) Hyderabad, Andhra Pradesh, India
- Height: 4 ft 8 in (142 cm)

Gymnastics career
- Discipline: Women's artistic gymnastics
- Country represented: India; (2013)
- College team: St. Mary's College, Hyderabad
Medal record
Women's artistic gymnastics
Representing India
Artistic Gymnastics World Cup
Bronze medal – third place	2018 Melbourne	Vault

Budda Aruna Reddy (born 25 December 1995) is an Indian female artistic gymnast, representing at international competitions. She won bronze medal in 2018 World Cup Gymnastics in women's vault event in Melbourne. She created history by becoming the first Indian to clinch a medal at Gymnastics World Cup. She competed at world championships, including the 2013 World Artistic Gymnastics Championships in Antwerp, Belgium. She is supported by GoSports Foundation through the Rahul Dravid athlete mentorship programme.

== Early life ==
Aruna Reddy was born in Hyderabad, Telangana to Subadhra and Narayana Reddy, an accountant. She has an elder sister, Pavani Reddy, a Company Secretary. She completed her Intermediate from St Mary's Junior College, Basheerbagh in 2013 and B.Com from St. Mary's College, Hyderabad in 2017. She has black belt in karate and was a trainer until she joined gymnastics.

== Early Gymnastics Career ==
When Aruna Reddy was five years old, her father pulled her out of karate and enrolled her in gymnastics, when he spotted that she had the flexibility and build for a gymnast. Her father then enrolled Aruna under the tutelage of coaches, Swarnalatha and Ravinder at the Lal Bahadur Shastri Stadium, Hyderabad.

Swarnalatha's husband Giriraj took Aruna under his wings after noticing her talent. Giriraj died in an accident in 2008 and Aruna has since been training under coach Brij Kishore with whom she won medals at three National Games of India.

== International Gymnastics career ==
Aruna participated in the World Championships in 2013, 2014 2017, & 2019 at Antwerp, Nanning, Montreal, & Stuttgart respectively, but failed to progress beyond the qualifying rounds.

=== World cup bronze medal ===
She competed at the 2018 Gymnastics World Cup and created history after becoming the first Indian to win a medal in an individual event at the Gymnastics World Cup by claiming a bronze medal in the women's individual vault event.

Aruna dedicated her win to her late father who inspired her to realize her potential. She received ₹2 crore cash award from the Chief Minister of Telangana, K. Chandrashekar Rao for her feat.

Aruna has won Two Gold Medals in the Table vault and Floor Events in the EGYPTIAN PHARAOHS CUP 2021, held in Cairo, Egypt from 17 – 19 December 2021.
