= China at the Olympics =

- IOC code: CHN
- NOC: Chinese Olympic Committee
- Website: www.olympic.cn (in Chinese)
- Medals Ranked 3rd: Gold 330 Silver 262 Bronze 227 Total 819

Summer appearances
- 1952; 1956–1980; 1984; 1988; 1992; 1996; 2000; 2004; 2008; 2012; 2016; 2020; 2024; 2028

Winter appearances
- 1980; 1984; 1988; 1992; 1994; 1998; 2002; 2006; 2010; 2014; 2018; 2022; 2026

Other related appearances
- Republic of China (1924–1948)

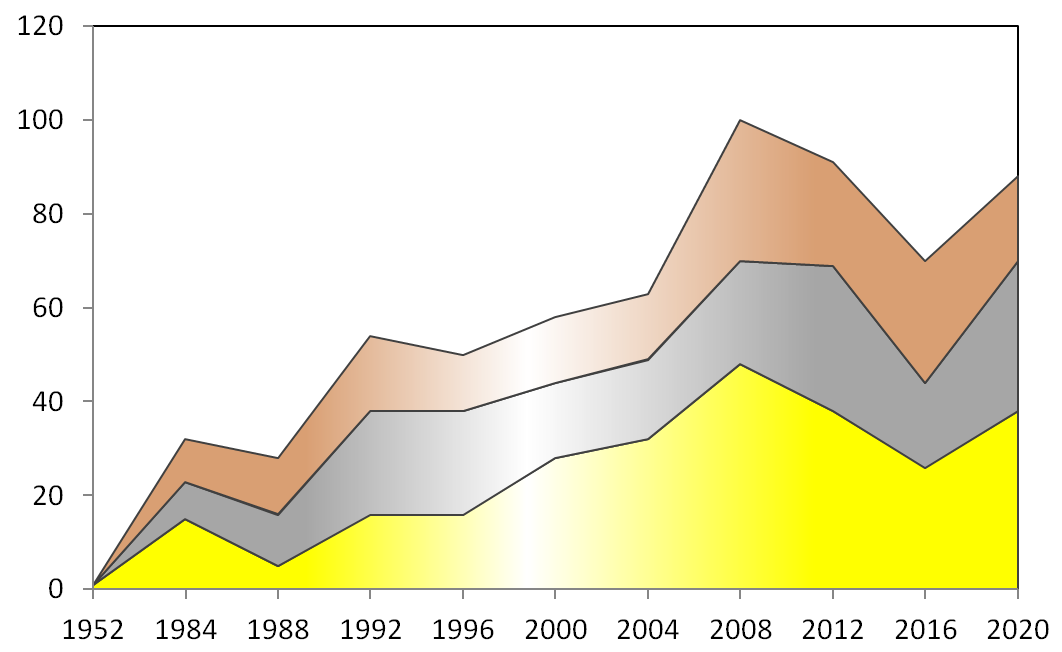
Number of medals won by China at the summer Olympic Games from 1952 to 2020

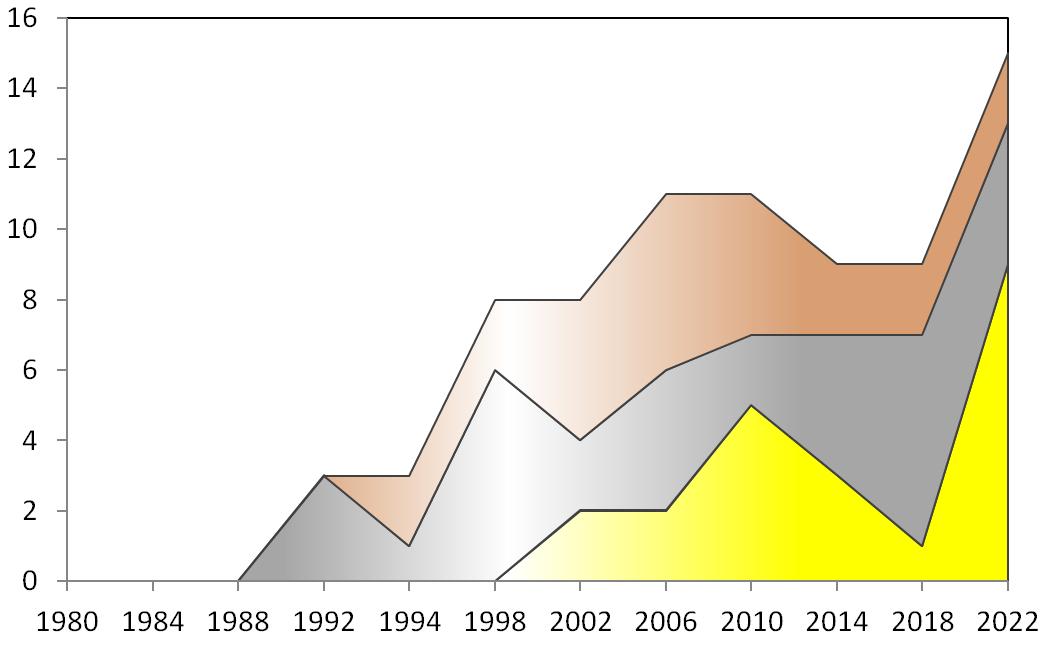
Number of medals won by China at the Olympic Winter Games from 1980 to 2022

The People's Republic of China (commonly known as China)'s participation in the Olympic games is relatively recent. Largely due to the Cultural Revolution and the International Olympic Committee's recognition of the Republic of China, The People's Republic of China did not participate in the Olympics for over 20 years; recognition of the Chinese Olympic Committee—or CHN—did not happen until 1979. The People's Republic of China sent its first full athletic delegation to the Summer Olympic Games in the 1984 Summer Olympics which was held in Los Angeles, United States.

As of 2026, China has finished at 1st place in the Summer Olympics once, at 2nd place four times, and 3rd place twice. It has won a total of 330 gold medals, 262 silver medals and 227 bronze medals over the course of 13 Olympic games.

With the nation's 12th appearance at the Summer and 13th appearance at the Winter Olympics, China is the most successful country overall in the Asia–Oceania region, making them the 3rd most successful country in Olympic history, after the United States and the Soviet Union.

== Participation ==
Originally having participated in Olympics as the delegation of the Republic of China (ROC) from 1924 to 1948, China competed at the Olympic Games under the name of the People's Republic of China (PRC) for the first time at the 1952 Summer Olympics held in Helsinki, Finland, although they only arrived in time during the last days to participate in one event. That year, the International Olympic Committee (IOC) allowed both the PRC and ROC (Republic of China) (which fled to Taiwan after the Chinese Civil War) to compete with the name "China", although the latter withdrew in protest. Due to the dispute over the political status of the "two Chinas", the PRC started a period of isolationism, withdrawing from several international sporting bodies and the UN system until the mid-1970s, when the country participated for the first time in the Asian Games in 1974 and the World University Games in 1977. Returning to the IOC officially only in 1979, which gave it the right to send an official delegation, starting from the 1980 Winter Olympics in Lake Placid, United States. Their first appearance at the Summer Olympic Games after 1952 was the 1984 Summer Olympics in Los Angeles, United States.

== Designation Issues - PRC versus ROC and classification of Hong Kong ==
The Chinese Olympic Committee in its current form was recognized in 1979. Before the Chinese Civil War, athletes competed as the Republic of China (ROC) at the Olympics. The ROC continued to compete from 1952 (Summer Olympics) to 1976 (Winter Olympics), but only representing athletes from the island of Taiwan (although the football team members of ROC in the 1960 Summer Olympic Games were overseas Hong Kongers). The dispute over use of the name China resulted in the PRC boycotting the Games completely during these years. In 1979, the International Olympic Committee approved the Nagoya Resolution in which the name "China" would be owned by the National Olympic Committee of the People's Republic of China, based in Beijing. While the Republic of China headquartered in Taipei would be called as Chinese Taipei, which also regulated the use of national symbols during the Games and any related events; this reopened the door for the PRC to finally join the Olympic movement.

Hong Kong has had a distinct National Olympic Committee since 1950 and has competed at the Games since 1952. After the territory was returned to the PRC and the Hong Kong Special Administrative Region was created in 1997, this arrangement has continued, with Hong Kong competing independently from the rest of the nation under the name Hong Kong, China. China is ranked fourth by total number of medals in the Olympic Games.

== Olympic bids and hosted Games ==
The People's Republic of China has hosted the Games on two occasions: in 2008 and in 2022. Beijing is the first city to have hosted both the Summer and Winter Olympics.

=== 2008 Summer Olympics ===
Following economic reforms under Deng Xiaoping, China underwent rapid economic growth. As a result, China successfully bid in 2001 to host the 2008 Olympic Games, signaling the CHN's debut as an Olympic host.

In order to host the 2008 Olympics Games, significant investment—particularly from the Government of China—was necessary. With contributions from both the public and private sectors, the central government allocated an estimated ¥313 billion CNY ($6.8 billion USD) to the Games. Associated expenses of hosting, such as infrastructure and developmental costs brought the total investment to around ¥313 billion CNY (roughly $43 billion USD), making it the biggest investment in an Olympics game yet. The event alone generated a profit of over ¥1 billion CNY.

The 2008 Olympic Games helped China reshape its international image by utilizing the country’s rich historical culture to divert attention from its past. The Olympics Fuwa mascots were designed to be deeply embedded in Chinese culture, with each ring associated with an aspect of Chinese heritage. Not only was the event able to bring a wider range of China’s culture to a global audience, China’s decision to represent one of the mascots, namely Yingying, as a Tibetan antelope was an attempt to legitimize its annexation of Tibet through symbolic entrenchment—a diplomatic practice used to justify the CCP's regional occupation through military incursion in 1951.

Such extensive state involvement indicated the state's goal as presenting China as an emerging global power. Preparation for the Games created millions of jobs for the domestic economy and bolstered nationalism significantly, while successfully hosting the event boosted tourism and increased foreign investments and confidence. Consequently, the country saw a GDP growth of 9.7% in the next year despite the effects of the 2008 financial crisis.

=== Hosted Games ===
Games	Host city	Dates	Nations	Participants	Events
2008 Summer Olympics	Beijing	August 8–24	204	10,942	302
2022 Winter Olympics	Beijing	February 4–20	91	2,871	109

=== Unsuccessful bids ===
Games	City	Winner of bid
2000 Summer Olympics	Beijing	Sydney, Australia
2010 Winter Olympics	Harbin	Vancouver, Canada

== Overview of Olympic participation ==
=== Timeline of participation ===
Olympic Year/s	Teams				
Olympic Year/s	Mainland China			Taiwan	
1924	China		(Chine)	as part of Japan (Note: except Kinmen and Matsu Islands, which have been controlled by China during all Olympics; Taiwan was reclaimed by China in 1945 following her victory against Japan.)	
1932–1936	Republic of China	China	(CHN)	as part of Japan	
1948	Republic of China		(CHN)		
1952	People's Republic of China	People's Republic of China (PRC)			
1956				Republic of China	Formosa-China (CHN)
1960				Republic of China	Formosa (RCF)
1964–1968				Republic of China	Taiwan (TWN)
1972–1976 W				Republic of China	Republic of China (ROC)
1980 W	People's Republic of China	People's Republic of China (CHN)			
1984–present	People's Republic of China	People's Republic of China (CHN)		Chinese Taipei for Olympic games	Chinese Taipei (TPE)

=== Medals by Summer Games ===
Host country

Games	Athletes	Gold	Silver	Bronze	Total	Rank
1924–1948	as part of the Republic of China					
(Finland) 1952 Helsinki	1	0	0	0	0	–
1956–1980	did not participate					
(United States) 1984 Los Angeles	216	15	8	9	32	4
(South Korea) 1988 Seoul	273	5	11	12	28	11
(Spain) 1992 Barcelona	244	16	22	16	54	4
(United States) 1996 Atlanta	294	16	22	12	50	4
(Australia) 2000 Sydney	271	28	16	14	58	3
(Greece) 2004 Athens	384	32	17	14	63	2
(China) 2008 Beijing	639	48	22	30	100	1
(United Kingdom) 2012 London	396	39	31	22	92	2
(Brazil) 2016 Rio de Janeiro	412	26	18	26	70	3
(Japan) 2020 Tokyo	406	38	32	19	89	2
(France) 2024 Paris	388	40	27	24	91	2
(United States) 2028 Los Angeles	future event					
(Australia) 2032 Brisbane	future event					
Total (12/30)	3,924	303	226	198	727	4

=== Medals by Winter Games ===
Host country

Games	Athletes	Gold	Silver	Bronze	Total	Rank
(United States) 1980 Lake Placid	24	0	0	0	0	–
(Socialist Federal Republic of Yugoslavia) 1984 Sarajevo	37	0	0	0	0	–
(Canada) 1988 Calgary	13	0	0	0	0	–
(France) 1992 Albertville	32	0	3	0	3	15
(Norway) 1994 Lillehammer	24	0	1	2	3	19
(Japan) 1998 Nagano	57	0	6	2	8	16
(United States) 2002 Salt Lake City	66	2	2	4	8	13
(Italy) 2006 Turin	76	2	4	5	11	14
(Canada) 2010 Vancouver	94	5	2	4	11	8
(Russia) 2014 Sochi	66	3	4	2	9	12
(South Korea) 2018 Pyeongchang	80	1	6	2	9	16
(China) 2022 Beijing	182	9	4	2	15	4
(Italy) 2026 Milano Cortina	125	5	4	6	15	12
(France) 2030 French Alps	future event					
(United States) 2034 Utah	future event					
Total (13/25)	876	27	36	29	92	16

== Medals by sports ==
=== Medals by summer sport ===
Chinese athletes have won medals in most of the current Summer Olympics sports.
The exceptions are triathlon, equestrian, rugby, skateboarding, surfing and water polo.

Leading in that sport

Sport	Gold	Silver	Bronze	Total
Diving	55	26	11	92
Weightlifting	43	16	8	67
Table tennis	37	21	8	66
Artistic gymnastics	31	26	21	78
Shooting	31	18	28	77
Badminton	22	15	15	52
Swimming	18	24	19	61
Athletics	12	13	18	43
Judo	8	3	12	23
Taekwondo	7	2	4	13
Boxing	6	7	6	19
Fencing	5	7	3	15
Canoeing	5	2	0	7
Trampoline gymnastics	4	5	7	16
Cycling	3	3	3	9
Sailing	3	3	2	8
Volleyball	3	1	2	6
Wrestling	2	6	12	20
Artistic swimming	2	5	2	9
Rowing	2	4	6	12
Tennis	2	1	1	4
Archery	1	7	2	10
Rhythmic gymnastics	1	1	0	2
Field hockey	0	2	0	2
Sport climbing	0	2	0	2
Basketball	0	1	1	2
Beach volleyball	0	1	1	2
Karate	0	1	1	2
Football	0	1	0	1
Modern pentathlon	0	1	0	1
Softball	0	1	0	1
Golf	0	0	2	2
3x3 basketball	0	0	1	1
Breaking	0	0	1	1
Handball	0	0	1	1
Totals (35 entries)	303	226	198	727

=== Medals by winter sport ===
Chinese athletes have won medals in 7 out of 15 current Winter Olympics sports.
Most of the golds and half of the medals come from the sport of short track speed skating.

Sport	Gold	Silver	Bronze	Total
Short track speed skating	12	17	9	38
Freestyle skiing	8	11	7	26
Speed skating	3	3	6	12
Figure skating	2	3	4	9
Snowboarding	2	2	1	5
Curling	0	0	1	1
Skeleton	0	0	1	1
Totals (7 entries)	27	36	29	92

Best results in non-medaling sports:

Summer
Sport	Rank	Athlete	Event & Year
Equestrian	8th	Alex Hua Tian	Individual eventing in 2016
Rugby	6th	China women's team	Women's tournament in 2024
Skateboarding	4th	Cui Chenxi	Women's street in 2024
Surfing	15th	Yang Siqi	Women's shortboard in 2024
Triathlon	28th	Lin Xinyu	Women's individual in 2024
Water polo	5th	China women's team	Women's tournament in 2008
Water polo	5th	China women's team	Women's tournament in 2012
Winter
Sport	Rank	Athlete	Event & Year
Alpine skiing	16th	Zhang Yangming	Men's combined in 2022
Biathlon	5th	Yu Shumei	Women's sprint in 1998
Bobsleigh	6th	Huai Mingming	Women's monobob in 2022
Cross-country skiing	10th	Chi Chunxue; Li Xin; Jialin Bayani; Ma Qinghua	Women's 4 × 5 km relay in 2022
Ice hockey	4th	China women's team	Women's tournament in 1998
Luge	7th	Wang Peixuan; Hou Shuo & Jubayi Saikeyi; Bao Zhenyu; Gulijienaiti Adikeyoumu & Zhao Jiaying	Mixed team relay in 2026
Nordic combined	10th	Zhao Zihe; Zhao Jiawen; Guo Yuhao; Fan Haibin	Men's team large hill/4 × 5 km in 2022
Ski jumping	8th	Liu Qi; Song Qiwu; Zeng Ping; Zhao Jiawen	Mixed team in 2026

== Flagbearer ==
=== Summer Games ===
Games	Opening	Gender	Sport	Closing	Gender	Sport
1984 Los Angeles	Wang Libin	M	Basketball			
1988 Seoul	Song Tao	M	Basketball			
1992 Barcelona	Song Ligang	M	Basketball			
1996 Atlanta	Liu Yudong	M	Basketball			
2000 Sydney	Liu Yudong	M	Basketball			
2004 Athens	Yao Ming	M	Basketball	Liu Xiang	M	Athletics
2008 Beijing	Yao Ming	M	Basketball	Zhang Ning	F	Badminton
2012 London	Yi Jianlian	M	Basketball	Xu Lijia	F	Sailing
2016 Rio de Janeiro	Lei Sheng	M	Fencing	Ding Ning	F	Table tennis
2020 Tokyo	Zhao Shuai	M	Taekwondo	Su Bingtian	M	Athletics
2020 Tokyo	Zhu Ting	F	Volleyball	Su Bingtian	M	Athletics
2024 Paris	Ma Long	M	Table tennis	Li Fabin	M	Weightlifting
2024 Paris	Feng Yu	F	Artistic swimming	Ou Zixia	F	Field hockey

=== Winter Games ===
Games	Opening	Gender	Sport	Closing	Gender	Sport
1980 Lake Placid	Zhao Weichang	M	Speed skating			
1984 Sarajevo	Zhao Shijian	M	Speed skating			
1988 Calgary	Zhang Shubin	M	Figure skating			
1992 Albertville	Song Chen	M	Speed skating			
1994 Lillehammer	Liu Gongfei	M	Speed skating			
1998 Nagano	Zhao Hongbo	M	Figure skating			
2002 Salt Lake City	Zhang Min	M	Figure skating			
2006 Turin	Yang Yang (A)	F	Short track speed skating	Han Xiaopeng	M	Freestyle skiing
2010 Vancouver	Han Xiaopeng	M	Freestyle skiing	Zhao Hongbo	M	Figure skating
2014 Sochi	Tong Jian	M	Figure skating	Liu Qiuhong	F	Short track speed skating
2018 Pyeongchang	Zhou Yang	F	Short track speed skating	Wu Dajing	M	Short track speed skating
2022 Beijing	Gao Tingyu	M	Speed skating	Gao Tingyu	M	Speed skating
2022 Beijing	Zhao Dan	F	Skeleton	Xu Mengtao	F	Freestyle skiing
2026 Milano Cortina	Ning Zhongyan	M	Speed skating			
2026 Milano Cortina	Zhang Chutong	F	Short track speed skating			

== History ==
=== Early appearance and hiatus ===
After the establishment of the People's Republic of China in 1949, PRC sent a delegation to the Olympic Games for the first time at the 1952 Summer Olympics in Helsinki, Finland. The Chinese delegation (including athletes and officials) consisted of 38 men and 2 women, including the men's football team, the men's basketball team, and one swimmer. Only the swimmer arrived in time to take part in the official competition, and the football team played two friendly matches. The Chinese stayed ten days in Helsinki and participated in the closing ceremony. The Republic of China's (ROC) team withdrew from the Games on July 17 in response to the IOC's decision to allow both PRC and ROC sportsmen and women to compete. This marked the beginning of the "two Chinas" conflict in the Olympic Movement, which resulted in the Chinese Olympic Committee's withdrawal from the IOC in August 1958.

In the 1970s, China normalized her relations with the United States through Ping Pong Diplomacy, and established diplomatic relations with the United States on January 1, 1979. The normalization finally led to the Chinese Olympic Committee's return to the IOC on October 25, 1979.

China boycotted the 1980 Olympic games in Moscow.

==== Sports summary ====
Till 2012, China won three-quarters of their gold medals (152 out of 201) and two-thirds of their medals (311 out of 473) in six sports: table tennis, badminton, diving, gymnastics, weightlifting, and shooting.

China recently dominated the gold medals in table tennis, badminton and diving. China won all golds four times in table tennis and one time in badminton, and won three-quarters of all diving golds since 1992.

The total dominance in table tennis and badminton has also lead to negative consequences. Due to the low participations among non-Asian countries, these two sports may lose their positions in the Summer Olympics just like baseball and softball did after 2008.

While through the years, Chinese athletes have made significant progress in sports in which China was less dominant. Among them, swimming is the potential one that may get into top five sports of China in the near future.

==== 1984 ====
China won 15 golds and ranked 4th at the 1984 Summer Olympics in Los Angeles.

Xu Haifeng won the first-ever gold medal for China in the shooting event of 50 m Pistol. It was called "a break through zero" – an event that brought great joy to the whole Chinese nation.

Li Ning won six medals in gymnastics, 3 golds, 2 silvers, and 1 bronze, earning him the nickname "Prince of Gymnasts" in China. Six medals in a single Olympics is still the record for any Chinese athlete.

Chinese women's volleyball team defeated USA women's team in the final and won China's first ball-game gold medal.

==== 1988 ====
China won 5 golds and ranked 11th at the 1988 Summer Olympics at Seoul, South Korea.

Li Meisu won China's first medal in athletics.

China also won first medals in rowing. A silver in women's coxed fours and a bronze in women's eights

==== 1992 ====
China won 16 golds and ranked 4th at the 1992 Summer Olympics at Barcelona, Spain.

Chen Yueling won China's first athletics gold medal in women's 10 km walk.

Chinese female swimmers glittered with 4 golds and 5 silvers. But the success was later shadowed by the doping incident of Chinese swimmers just two years later at the 1994 Asian Games, although none of the medalists in 1992 was involved in the 1994 incident.

Deng Yaping won two table tennis golds in women's singles and women's doubles. IOC president Juan Antonio Samaranch presented the gold medal to her after a promise made a year ago at 1991 World Table Tennis Championships.

Zhuang Xiaoyan won China's first judo gold medal in women's +72kg.

Zhang Xiaodong won silver medal in women's board (lechner), China's first medal in sailing.

The Chinese women's basketball team lost in the final to the Unified team, winning a silver medal, China's best result in basketball.

==== 1996 ====
China won 16 golds and ranked 4th again at the 1996 Summer Olympics at Atlanta, USA.

Fu Mingxia won two diving golds in women's 3 m springboard and women's 10 m platform, becoming the first female diver to accomplish this feat since 1960.

Deng Yaping won two golds in table tennis again, making her the first Chinese athlete to defend two events and win four Olympic gold medals. IOC president Juan Antonio Samaranch presented the gold medal to her again after a promise made four years ago at 1992 Olympics.

Liu Guoliang also won two table tennis golds in men's events. China won all four golds in table tennis for the first time.

Wang Junxia won gold in women's 5000 m and silver in women's 10000 m.

The Chinese women's football team lost final to the USA team, winning a silver medal, China's first medal in football.

==== 2000 ====
China won 28 golds and ranked 3rd at the 2000 Summer Olympics at Sydney, Australia.

Wang Nan won two golds in table tennis, China again won all four golds in table tennis.

Chen Zhong won China's first taekwondo gold medal in women's +67kg.

Jiang Cuihua won bronze in women's track time trial, China's first medal in cycling. No ball-games team entered the final four, the worst performance China's since Olympic history.

==== 2004 ====
China won 32 golds and ranked 2nd at the 2004 Summer Olympics at Athens, Greece.

Liu Xiang became the first Chinese male athlete to win gold medal in an Olympic track event, 110 m hurdles, equaling the world record of 12.91 seconds. He became the China's flag bearer at the closing ceremony. Liu broke the world record with 12.88 seconds two years later in Lausanne, Switzerland.

Wang Yifu participated the Olympics for the record six consecutive times. He won gold in 10 m air pistol, his second gold and fourth medal in the event.

Meng Guanliang and Yang Wenjun won China's first canoeing gold medal in men's C-2 500 m.

Li Ting and Sun Tiantian won China's first tennis gold medal in women's doubles.

Wang Xu won China's first wrestling gold medal in women's freestyle 72 kg.

The Chinese women's volleyball team came back from a 0–2 deficit to defeat Russia women's team 3–2 in the final, winning China's second ball-game gold medal after 20 years.

==== 2008 ====
As the host country, China won 48 golds, 22 silvers and 30 bronze, in total 100 medals, and ranked 1st at the 2008 Summer Olympics in Beijing.

Guo Jingjing won two golds in diving, becoming the first Chinese diver to defend two events successfully.

Zhang Yining won two golds in table tennis, becoming the second Chinese table tennis player to defend two events successfully after Deng Yaping.

Ma Lin also won two table tennis golds in men's events. China won all four golds in table tennis for the third time.

Zhong Man won China's first men's fencing gold in men's sabre, 24 years after Luan Jujie won China's first women's fencing gold in 1984.

Zhang Juanjuan won China's first archery gold in women's individual, breaking the long-time Korean dominance in the sport.

Zou Shiming and Zhang Xiaoping won China's first boxing golds in men's events.

Yin Jian won China's first sailing gold in sailboard event in women's sailboard.

China won first rowing gold in women's quadruple sculls.

Chinese gymnasts won 11 golds, the best in history. Zou Kai won 3 golds in one team event and two individual events.

China's top star Liu Xiang pulled out of the first round of 110 m hurdles due to injury.

==== 2012 ====
China won 38 golds and finished 2nd at the 2012 Summer Olympics in London, Great Britain.

Sun Yang, the men's 1500 m freestyle world-record-holder before the Olympics, became the first Chinese male swimmer to win gold in Olympics. He won two golds in men's 400 m freestyle and men's 1500 m freestyle, breaking the Olympic record and his own world record respectively.

Ye Shiwen became the first Chinese female swimmer to win two golds in a single Olympics. She won golds in women's 200 m medley and women's 400 m medley, breaking the Olympic record and world record respectively.

Chen Ding won gold in men's 20 km walk, becoming the second Chinese male athlete to win Olympic athletics gold medal after Liu Xiang did in 2004.

Chen Ruolin won two golds in diving, becoming the second Chinese diver to defend two events successfully after Guo Jingjing.

Wu Minxia won diving gold in women's sync 3m springboard, becoming the only Chinese athlete to win three gold medals in a single event. She also won gold in women's 3m springboard, giving her all three medals in three participations in this event after silver in 2004 and bronze in 2008.

Zou Kai won two golds in gymnastics, becoming the only Chinese athlete to win five gold medals in Olympics.

Xu Lijia won gold in women's laser radial class, China's first gold medal in the sailboat event of sailing. She later became the China's flag bearer at the closing ceremony.

Lin Dan won badminton gold in men's singles, becoming the first athlete to defend the men's singles title in Olympic badminton history.

Zhao Yunlei won two golds in two badminton double events, becoming the only athlete to win two badminton gold medals in a single Olympics.

Cao Zhongrong won silver in men's event of modern pentathlon, China's first medal in the sport.

The Chinese table tennis team won all four golds for the fourth time. Chinese badminton team won all five golds for the first time, but was shadowed by the disqualification of China's top seed women's double duo for attempting to purposefully lose.

China's top star Liu Xiang pulled out of the first round of 110 m hurdles due to injury again. Two of his three pull-outs in 12 years' career came from two Olympics first round heats.

No Chinese ball-game teams entered the final four, the worst performance in Chinese Summer Olympics history.

==== 2016 ====
China won 26 golds and ranked 3rd at the 2016 Summer Olympics in Rio de Janeiro, Brazil.

Sun Yang won a gold medal in men's 200 m freestyle, becoming the only Chinese male swimmer to have won gold in 2 Olympic games.

Gong Jinjie and Zhong Tianshi won China's first cycling gold medal in women's team sprint.

Feng Shanshan won China's first golf medal.

Dong Bin set a new personal best (17.58 meters) in the men's triple jump event and won a bronze medal. This was China's first medal from Olympic triple jump events.

The Chinese women's volleyball team won a third gold medal after 12 years.

Wu Minxia defended her Women's 3m Synchro event for the fourth time, becoming the only Chinese athlete to ever do so. This also makes her the most successful Chinese athlete of all time, with 5 Golds, 1 Silver, and 1 Bronze.

==== 2020 ====
China won 38 gold, 32 silver, 18 bronze medals and ranked 2nd at the 2020 Summer Olympics in Tokyo, Japan in August 2021.

Su Bingtian finished the men's 100 m semi-final with a new Asian Record at 9.83 seconds, and became the first Chinese athlete and second Asian athlete to compete in a 100 m final, in which he finished as the 6th place. He was also the flag bearer in the closing ceremony. With him, Chinese relay team won China's first medal in athletic relays.

Gong Lijiao won a gold medal in women's shot put and become the first ever Chinese athlete to won a gold medal in any field events and the first Asian to win an Olympic gold medal in women's shot put.

Liu Shiying won a gold medal in women's javelin throw. She became the first Asian and Chinese to win a gold medal in Olympic javelin throw events.

Lü Xiaojun lifted a combined weight of 374 kg to win a gold medal in the men's 81 kg weightlifting event. This was his third Olympic medal. He also became the oldest weightlifter champion (37 years and 4 days) in modern Olympics. He became the first ever Chinese athlete to win three gold medals in an individual event, after promoted a gold medal.

==== 2024 ====
China won 40 gold, 27 silver, 24 bronze medals, and ranked 2nd at the 2024 Summer Olympics in Paris, France in August 2024, their best result after the 2008 Summer Olympics in Beijing.

Zheng Qinwen won the gold medal in women's singles tennis, marking China's and Asia's first-ever gold in the Olympic singles tennis event; meanwhile, Zhang Zhizhen and Wang Xinyu won the silver in the mixed doubles, making China the most successful team in tennis at this Olympics.

Deng Yawen won China's first gold medal in women's BMX freestyle.

Pan Zhanle won China's first gold in men's 100 m freestyle, breaking Olympic, Asian, and his own world record with a time of 46.40. With him, the Chinese swimming relay team won China's first gold in 4 x 100 m medley relay, topping the American swimming relay team and their undefeated gold when they participated since its introduction.

Chang Yuan, Wu Yu, and Li Qian all won gold medals with Yang Wenlu and Yang Liu winning silver medals in their respective weight classes, China's best result for boxing.

The Chinese diving team won all 8 gold medals in diving, the first all-golds in diving since the introduction of synchronized diving.

Liu Qingyi won a bronze medal in breaking, its inaugural event at the Olympics.

The Chinese artistic swimming team won gold in the team event, with Wang Liuyi and Wang Qianyi winning gold in the duet event. These were the first golds for China in artistic swimming.

The Chinese women's field hockey team won silver, their best result yet.

The Chinese table tennis team won all five golds for the first time since the mixed event addition in 2020. Ma Long also won his sixth gold medal, putting him as the Chinese Olympian with the most gold medals.

=== Winter Games ===
==== Sports summary ====
China won medals in only 6 of the 15 Winter Olympics sports. Most of the golds and half of the medals come from short track speed skating.

==== 1980–1988 ====
No medals.

==== 1992–1998 ====
Ye Qiaobo won China's first Winter Olympics medal in speed skating.

Chen Lu won consecutive bronze medals in 1994 and 1998, becoming the first Chinese figure skater to medal at the Winter Olympic Games.

==== 2002 ====
Yang Yang (A) won the country's first Winter Olympics gold medal in short track speed skating, as the first gold medal for Team China in Olympic Winter Games.

==== 2006 ====
Han Xiaopeng became the first Chinese male athlete to win a Winter Olympics gold medal in freestyle skiing.

==== 2010 ====
Wang Meng earned three golds in short track speed skating.

Shen Xue and Zhao Hongbo won figure skating gold in the event of pair skating, after four prior participations.

Wang Bingyu and her team (Yue Qingshuang, Liu Yin, Zhou Yan and Liu Jinli) won the first curling Olympic medal for China in the women's tournament.

==== 2014 ====
China won 3 gold, 4 silver, 2 bronze medals and ranked 12th at the 2014 Winter Olympics in Sochi, Russia in February 2014.

Zhang Hong won the first Chinese gold medal in speed skating.

==== 2018 ====
China won 1 gold, 6 silver, 2 bronze medals and ranked 16th at the 2018 Winter Olympics in Pyeongchang, South Korea in February 2018.

Liu Jiayu won the country's first ever Olympic medal in snowboarding for China.

Wu Dajing became the first Chinese male short track speed skating Olympic champion by breaking the world record at the 500-metre event.

==== 2022 ====
China won 9 gold, 4 silver, 2 bronze medals and ranked 4th at the 2022 Winter Olympics in Beijing, China in February 2022, as the first ever home winter games.

Ailing Eileen Gu became the first ever freestyle skier to win three medals at one Olympic Game, the first female Chinese gold medalist in freestyle skiing, and the most successful freestyle skier ever in Olympic freestyle skiing event (with 2 gold medals and 1 silver medals).

Yan Wengang won the first ever medal in skeleton for Team China, bronze in men's single.

Xu Mengtao finally won the first ever gold in women's aerial since the first silver medal won by Xu Nannan in Nagano 1998 and 5 silver medals & 2 bronze medals won by Team China in this event at former games.

Su Yiming became the first Chinese athlete to win a gold in Olympic snowboarding events.

Gao Tingyu became the first Chinese male athlete to win a gold in Olympic speed skating events.

== Medalists ==
=== Summer Olympics ===
Since Chinese athletes are more likely to compete in more than one event in the sport of diving, gymnastics, table tennis, swimming, and more likely to compete in several Olympic games in the sport of shooting, most multiple medalists listed in the following three tables come from these five sports.

==== Multiple medalists ====
This is a list of Chinese athletes who have won at least three gold medals or five medals at the Summer Olympics.

Name	Sport	Years	Played	Gender	Gold	Silver	Bronze	Total
**6 Gold medals**
Ma Long	Table tennis	2012–2024	4	M	6	0	0	6
**5 Gold medals**
Wu Minxia	Diving	2004–2016	4	F	5	1	1	7
Zou Kai	Gymnastics	2008–2012	2	M	5	0	1	6
Chen Ruolin	Diving	2008–2016	3	F	5	0	0	5
**4 Gold medals**
Guo Jingjing	Diving	1996–2008	4	F	4	2	0	6
**Cao Yuan**	Diving	2012–2024	4	M	4	1	1	6
Fu Mingxia	Diving	1992–2000	3	F	4	1	0	5
Wang Nan	Table tennis	2000–2008	3	F	4	1	0	5
Shi Tingmao	Diving	2016–2020	2	F	4	0	0	4
Li Xiaopeng	Gymnastics	2000–2008	3	M	4	0	1	5
Deng Yaping	Table tennis	1992–1996	2	F	4	0	0	4
Zhang Yining	Table tennis	2004–2008	2	F	4	0	0	4
**Chen Meng**	Table tennis	2020–2024	2	F	4	0	0	4
**3 Gold medals**
Li Ning	Gymnastics	1984–1988	2	M	3	2	1	6
Sun Yang	Swimming	2008–2016	3	M	3	2	1	6
Yang Wei	Gymnastics	2000–2008	3	M	3	2	0	5
Xiong Ni	Diving	1988–2000	4	M	3	1	1	5
Chen Yibing	Gymnastics	2008–2012	2	M	3	1	0	4
Zhang Jike	Table tennis	2012–2016	2	M	3	1	0	4
**Fan Zhendong**	Table tennis	2020–2024	2	M	3	1	0	4
Li Xiaoxia	Table tennis	2012–2016	2	F	3	1	0	4
Ding Ning	Table tennis	2012–2016	2	F	3	1	0	4
Ma Lin	Table tennis	2004–2008	2	M	3	0	0	3
Lü Xiaojun	Weightlifting	2012–2020	3	M	3	0	0	3
**Quan Hongchan**	Diving	2020–2024	2	F	3	0	0	3
**Xie Siyi**	Diving	2020–2024	2	M	3	0	0	3
**5 or more medals**
**Zhang Yufei**	Swimming	2020-2024	2	F	2	3	5	10
Li Xiaoshuang	Gymnastics	1992–1996	2	M	2	3	1	6
Wang Yifu	Shooting	1984–2004	6	M	2	3	1	6
Wang Hao	Table tennis	2004–2012	3	M	2	3	0	5
Lou Yun	Gymnastics	1984–1988	2	M	2	2	1	5
**Zou Jingyuan**	Gymnastics	2020-2024	2	M	2	2	1	5
Qin Kai	Diving	2008–2016	3	M	2	1	2	5
**Xu Jiayu**	Swimming	2016–2024	3	M	1	4	0	5
**Yang Junxuan**	Swimming	2020–2024	2	W	1	2	3	5
Huang Xuechen	Synchronized swimming	2008–2020	4	W	0	5	2	7
Sun Wenyan	Synchronized swimming	2012–2020	3	W	0	5	0	6

==== Multiple gold medalists at a single game ====
This is a list of Chinese athletes who have won at least two gold medals at a single Summer Olympics. Order first by golds, then by sports, then by year.

Name	Sport	Year	Gender	Gold	Silver	Bronze	Total
**3 Gold medals**
Li Ning	Gymnastics	1984	M	3	2	1	6
Zou Kai	Gymnastics	2008	M	3	0	0	3
**2 Gold medals**
Artistic swimming
Wang Liuyi	Artistic swimming	2024	F	2	0	0	2
Wang Qianyi	Artistic swimming	2024	F	2	0	0	2
Badminton
Zhao Yunlei	Badminton	2012	F	2	0	0	2
Diving
Fu Mingxia	Diving	1996	F	2	0	0	2
Xiong Ni	Diving	2000	M	2	0	0	2
Guo Jingjing	Diving	2004	F	2	0	0	2
Guo Jingjing	Diving	2008	F	2	0	0	2
Chen Ruolin	Diving	2008	F	2	0	0	2
Chen Ruolin	Diving	2012	F	2	0	0	2
Wu Minxia	Diving	2012	F	2	0	0	2
**Chen Aisen**	Diving	2016	M	2	0	0	2
Shi Tingmao	Diving	2016	F	2	0	0	2
**Xie Siyi**	Diving	2020	M	2	0	0	2
Shi Tingmao	Diving	2020	F	2	0	0	2
Quan Hongchan	Diving	2024	F	2	0	0	2
Gymnastics
Li Xiaopeng	Gymnastics	2000	M	2	0	0	2
Li Xiaopeng	Gymnastics	2008	M	2	0	0	2
Yang Wei	Gymnastics	2008	M	2	1	0	3
Xiao Qin	Gymnastics	2008	M	2	0	0	2
Chen Yibing	Gymnastics	2008	M	2	0	0	2
He Kexin	Gymnastics	2008	F	2	0	0	2
Zou Kai	Gymnastics	2012	M	2	0	1	3
Feng Zhe	Gymnastics	2012	M	2	0	0	2
Swimming
Sun Yang	Swimming	2012	M	2	1	1	4
**Ye Shiwen**	Swimming	2012	F	2	0	0	2
**Zhang Yufei**	Swimming	2020	F	2	2	0	4
Table tennis
Deng Yaping	Table tennis	1992	F	2	0	0	2
Deng Yaping	Table tennis	1996	F	2	0	0	2
Liu Guoliang	Table tennis	1996	M	2	0	0	2
Wang Nan	Table tennis	2000	F	2	0	0	2
Zhang Yining	Table tennis	2004	F	2	0	0	2
Zhang Yining	Table tennis	2008	F	2	0	0	2
Ma Lin	Table tennis	2008	M	2	0	0	2
Li Xiaoxia	Table tennis	2012	F	2	0	0	2
Zhang Jike	Table tennis	2012	M	2	0	0	2
**Ma Long**	Table tennis	2016	M	2	0	0	2
Ding Ning	Table tennis	2016	F	2	0	0	2
**Ma Long**	Table tennis	2020	M	2	0	0	2
**Chen Meng**	Table tennis	2020	F	2	0	0	2

==== Multiple medalists in a single event ====
This is a list of Chinese athletes who have won at least three medals in a single event at Summer Olympics. Order first by medals, then by sport, then by golds.

Name	Sport	Event	Years	Played	Gender	Gold	Silver	Bronze	Medal	Total
**4 Gold medals**
Wu Minxia	Diving	Women's Synchro 3m Springboard	2004–2016	4	F	2004, 2008, 2012, 2016	−	−	4–0–0	4
**4 medals**
Huang Xuechen	Artistic swimming	Team	2008–2020	4	F	−	2012, 2016, 2020	2008	0–3–1	4
Wang Yifu	Shooting	Men's 10 m air pistol	1984–2004	5^{2}	M	1992, 2004	1996, 2000	−	2–2–0	4
Dong Dong	Trampoline gymnastics	Men's Individual Trampoline	2008–2020	4	M	2012	2016, 2020	2008	1–2–1	4
**3 Gold medals**
**Lü Xiaojun**	Weightlifting	Men's 77/81 kg^{5}	2012–2020	3	M	2012, 2016, 2020	−	−	3–0–0	3
**Ma Long**	Table tennis	Men's team	2012–2020	3	M	2012, 2016, 2020	−	−	3–0–0	3
Chen Ruolin	Diving	Women's Synchro 10m platform	2008–2016	3	F	2008, 2012, 2016	−	−	3–0–0	3
**3 medals**
Huang Xuechen	Artistic swimming	Duet	2012–2020	3	F	−	2016, 2020	2012	0–2–1	3
**Liu Hong**	Athletics	Women's 20 km walk	2008–2020	4	M	2016	2012	2020	1–1–1	3
Zou Shiming	Boxing	Men's light flyweight	2004–2012	3	M	2008, 2012	−	2004	2–0–1	3
**Chen Long**	Badminton	Men's singles	2012–2020	3	M	2016	2020	2012	1–1–1	3
Fu Haifeng	Badminton	Men's doubles	2004–2016	4	M	2012, 2016	2008	−	2–1–0	3
Guo Jingjing	Diving	Women's Synchro 3 m Springboard	1996–2008	3^{3}	F	2004, 2008	2000	−	2–1–0	3
Guo Jingjing	Diving	Women's 3 m Springboard	1996–2008	3^{3}	F	2004, 2008	2000	−	2–1–0	3
Qin Kai	Diving	Men's Synchro 3 m Springboard	2008–2016	3	M	2008, 2012	−	2016	2–0–1	3
Wu Minxia	Diving	Women's 3 m Springboard	2004–2012	3	F	2012	2004	2008	1–1–1	3
Tan Liangde	Diving	Men's 3 m Springboard	1984–1992	3	M	−	1984, 1988, 1992	−	0–3–0	3
Li Xiaopeng	Gymnastics	Men's parallel bars	2000–2008	3	M	2000, 2008	−	2004	2–0–1	3
Chen Jing^{4}	Table tennis	Women's singles	1988–2000	3	F	1988	1996	2000	1–1–1	3
**Gong Lijiao**	Athletics	Women's shot put	2008–2020	4	F	2020	2012	2008	1–1–1	3
Pang Wei	Shooting	Men's 10 m air pistol	2008–2020	4	M	2008	−	2016, 2020	1–0–2	3
Wang Hao	Table tennis	Men's singles	2004–2012	3	M	−	2004, 2008, 2012	−	0–3–0	3
Sun Wenyan	Artistic swimming	Team	2012–2020	3	F	−	2012, 2016, 2020	−	0–3–0	3
Sheng Zetian	Wrestling	Men's Greco-Roman 57/58 kg^{6}	1992–2000	3	M	−	−	1992, 1996, 2000	0–0–3	3

^{2} Wang Yifu competed at six Olympic Games from 1984 to 2004. But 10 m air pistol was introduced to the Olympics after 1988. So he competed five times in the event. He ranked 15th in 1988 and ranked top two at the next four Olympics.
^{3} Guo Jingjing competed at four Olympic Games from 1996 to 2008. She ranked 5th in the event of 10m platform diving in 1996 at the age of 15. After that, due to rapid increase of height and weight, she switched to more suitable springboard diving. She competed in two 3m springboard events in the next three Olympics and got six medals.
^{4} Chen Jing competed for China in 1988, and for Chinese Taipei in 1996 and 2000.
^{5} The category was 77 kg in 2012 and 2016 Olympics, and then changed to 81 kg in 2000.
^{6} The category was 57 kg in 1992 and 1996 Olympics, and then changed to 58 kg in 2000.

==== Most appearances ====
This is a list of Chinese athletes who competed in at least four Summer Olympics. Still active athletes are marked in bold. Age 15- and 40+ are marked in bold.

Name	Sport	Gender	Born Year	Games Year	First/Last Age	Best Result	Gold	Silver	Bronze	Medal	Total
**6 appearances**
Wang Yifu	Shooting	M	1960	1984–2004	23–**43**	**Gold**	1992, 2004	1992, 1996, 2000	1984	2–3–1	6
**5 appearances**
Ye Chong	Fencing	M	1969	1988–2004	18–34	Silver	−	2000, 2004	–	0–2–0	2
Tan Zongliang	Shooting	M	1971	1996–2012	24–**40**	Silver	−	2008	−	0–1–0	1
**Gong Lijiao**	Athletics	F	1989	2008–2024	19–35	**Gold**	2020	2012	2008	1–1–1	3
**4 appearances**
Diving
Xiong Ni	Diving	M	1974	1988–2000	**14**–26	**Gold**	1996, 2000^{x2}	1988	1992	3–1–1	5
Guo Jingjing	Diving	F	1981	1996–2008	**14**–26	**Gold**	2004^{x2}, 2008^{x2}	2000^{x2}	−	4–2–0	6
Wu Minxia	Diving	W	1985	2004–2016	18–30	**Gold**	2004, 2008, 2012^{x2}, 2016	2004	2008	5–1–1	7
Badminton
Lin Dan	Badminton	M	1983	2004–2016	20–32	**Gold**	2008, 2012	−	−	2–0–0	2
Fu Haifeng	Badminton	M	1984	2004–2016	20–32	**Gold**	2012, 2016	2008	−	2–1–0	3
Athletics
Zhang Wenxiu	Athletics	F	1986	2004–2016	18–30	Silver	−	2008，2016	2012	0–2–1	3
Shooting
Du Li	Shooting	F	1982	2004–2016	22–34	**Gold**	2004, 2008	2016	2016	2–1–1	4
Zhu Qinan	Shooting	M	1984	2004–2016	19–31	**Gold**	2004	2008	−	1–1–0	2
Chen Ying	Shooting	F	1977	2004–2016	26–38	**Gold**	2008	2012	−	1–1–0	2
**Wei Ning**	Shooting	F	1982	2004–2016	22–34	Silver	−	2004, 2012	−	0–2–0	2
**Hu Binyuan**	Shooting	M	1977	2004–2016	27–39	Bronze	−	−	2008	0–0–1	1
Fencing
Luan Jujie^{6}	Fencing	F	1958	1984–1988, 2000, 2008	26–**50**	**Gold**	1984	−	−	1–0–0	1
Xiao Aihua	Fencing	F	1971	1988–2000	17–29	5; 2000	−	−	−	0-0-0	0
Wang Haibin	Fencing	M	1973	1992–2004	18–30	Silver	−	2000, 2004	−	0–2–0	2
Li Na	Fencing	F	1981	2000–2012	19–31	**Gold**	2012	−	2000	1–0–1	2
Basketball
Zheng Haixia	Basketball	F	1967	1984–1996	17–29	Silver	−	1992	1984	0–1–1	2
Li Nan	Basketball	M	1974	1996–2008	22–34	8; 1996, 2004, 2008	−	−	−	0-0-0	0
Wang Zhizhi	Basketball	M	1977	1996–2000, 2008–2012	19–35	8; 1996, 2008	−	−	−	0-0-0	0
Chen Nan	Basketball	F	1983	2004–2016	21–33	4; 2008	−	−	−	0-0-0	0
Yi Jianlian	Basketball	M	1987	2004–2016	17–29	8; 2004, 2008	−	−	−	0-0-0	0
Table tennis
**Ma Long**	Table tennis	M	1988	2012–2024	24–35	**Gold**	2012, 2016^{x2}, 2020^{x2}, 2024	-	-	6–0–0	6

^{6} Luan Jujie competed for China in 1984, winning China's first Olympic fencing gold. She moved to Canada in 1985 and competed for Canada in 1988, 2000, and 2008.

==== The youngest and oldest gold medalists ====
Name	Gender	Born Date	Event date	Sport	Event	Age
**The 5 youngest gold medalists**
Fu Mingxia	F	August 16, 1978	July 27, 1992	Diving	Women's 10 m platform	13 years, 346 days
Quan Hongchan	F	March 28, 2007	August 5, 2021	Diving	Women's 10 m platform	14 years, 130 days
Ren Qian	F	February 20, 2001	August 18, 2016	Diving	Women's 10 m platform	15 years, 180 days
Chen Ruolin	F	December 12, 1992	August 12, 2008	Diving	Women's synchronized 10 m platform	15 years, 244 days
Chen Ruolin	F	December 12, 1992	August 21, 2008	Diving	Women's 10 m platform	15 years, 253 days
**The 5 oldest gold medalists**
Wang Yifu	M	December 4, 1960	August 14, 2004	Shooting	Men's 10 m air pistol	43 years, 254 days
Lü Xiaojun	M	July 27, 1984	July 31, 2021	Weightlifting	Men's 81 kg	37 years, 4 days
Zhang Ning	F	May 19, 1975	August 16, 2008	Badminton	Women's singles	33 years, 89 days
Qiu Jian	M	June 25, 1975	August 17, 2008	Shooting	Men's 50 m rifle 3 positions	33 years, 53 days
Fu Haifeng	M	August 23, 1983	August 19, 2016	Badminton	Men's doubles	32 years, 362 days

=== Winter Olympics ===
==== Multiple medalists ====
This is a list of Chinese athletes who have won at least two gold medals or three medals at the Winter Olympics. Still active athletes are marked in bold.

Name	Sport	Years	Played	Gender	Gold	Silver	Bronze	Total
**2 or more Gold medals**
Wang Meng	Short track speed skating	2006–2010	2	F	4	1	1	6
**Ailing Eileen Gu**	Freestyle skiing	2022-2026	2	F	3	3	0	6
Zhou Yang	Short track speed skating	2010–2018	3	F	3	0	0	3
**Wu Dajing**	Short track speed skating	2014–2022	3	M	2	2	1	5
**Xu Mengtao**	Freestyle skiing	2010–2026	5	F	2	2	1	5
Yang Yang (A)	Short track speed skating	1998–2006	3	F	2	2	1	5
Su Yiming	Snowboarding	2022–2026	2	M	2	1	1	4
Ren Ziwei	Short track speed skating	2018–2022	2	M	2	1	0	3
**3 or more medals**
Fan Kexin	Short track speed skating	2014–2026	3	F	1	1	1	3
Shen Xue	Figure skating	1998–2010	4	F	1	0	2	3
Zhao Hongbo	Figure skating	1998–2010	4	M	1	0	2	3
Ning Zhongyan	Speed skating	2022–2026	2	M	1	0	2	3
Yang Yang (S)	Short track speed skating	1994–2002	3	F	0	4	1	5
Li Jiajun	Short track speed skating	1994–2006	4	M	0	2	3	5
Han Tianyu	Short track speed skating	2014–2018	2	M	0	2	1	3
Ye Qiaobo	Speed skating	1992–1994	2	F	0	2	1	3
Wang Chunlu	Short track speed skating	1998–2002	2	F	0	2	1	3
Jia Zongyang	Freestyle skiing	2010–2022	4	M	0	2	1	3

==== Multiple gold medalists at a single game ====
This is a list of Chinese athletes who have won at least two gold medals at one Winter Olympics. Order first by golds, then by sports, then by year.

Name	Sport	Years	Gender	Gold	Silver	Bronze	Total
**3 Gold medals**
Wang Meng	Short track speed skating	2010	F	3	0	0	3
**2 Gold medals**
Yang Yang (A)	Short track speed skating	2002	F	2	1	0	3
Zhou Yang	Short track speed skating	2010	F	2	0	0	2
Eileen Gu	Freestyle skiing	2022	F	2	1	0	3

==== Multiple medalists in a single event ====
This is a list of Chinese athletes who have won at least three medals in a single event at Winter Olympics. Order first by medals, then by sport, then by golds.

Name	Sport	Event	Years	Played	Gender	Gold	Silver	Bronze	Medal	Total
**3 medals**
Xu Mengtao	Freestyle skiing	Aerials	2010-2026	4	M	2022, 2026	2014	−	2–1–0	3
Shen Xue	Figure skating	Pair skating	1998–2010	4	F	2010	−	2002, 2006	1–0–2	3
Zhao Hongbo	Figure skating	Pair skating	1998–2010	4	M	2010	−	2002, 2006	1–0–2	3

==== Most appearances ====
This is a list of Chinese athletes who competed in at least four Winter Olympics. Still active athletes are marked in bold.

Name	Sport	Gender	Born Year	Games Year	First/Last Age	Best Result	Gold	Silver	Bronze	Medal	Total
**5 appearances**
**Zhang Hao**	Figure skating	M	1984	2002–2018	18–34	silver	−	2006	−	0–1–0	1
**4 appearances**
Shen Xue	Figure skating	F	1978	1998–2010	20–32	**Gold**	2010	−	2002, 2006	1–0–2	3
Zhao Hongbo	Figure skating	M	1973	1998–2010	25–37	**Gold**	2010	−	2002, 2006	1–0–2	3
Li Jiajun	Short track speed skating	M	1975	1994–2006	19–31	Silver	−	1998, 2002	1998, 2002, 2006	0–2–3	5
Wang Manli	Speed skating	F	1973	1994–2006	21–33	Silver	−	2006	−	0–1–0	1
Pang Qing	Figure skating	F	1979	2002–2014	22–34	Silver	−	2010	−	0–1–0	1
Tong Jian	Figure skating	M	1979	2002–2014	22–34	Silver	−	2010	−	0–1–0	1
Liu Xianying	Biathlon	F	1977	1998–2010	21–33	7; 1998, 2006	−	−	−	0-0-0	0

==== The youngest and oldest gold medalists ====
Name	Gender	Born Date	Event date	Sport	Event	Age
**The 5 youngest gold medalists**
Su Yiming	M	February 18, 2004	February 15, 2022	Snowboarding	Men's big air	17 years, 362 days
Gu Ailing Eileen	F	September 3, 2003	February 8, 2022	Freestyle skiing	Women's big air	18 years, 158 days
Gu Ailing Eileen	F	September 3, 2003	February 18, 2022	Freestyle skiing	Women's halfpipe	18 years, 168 days
Zhou Yang	F	June 9, 1991	February 20, 2010	Short track speed skating	Women's 1500 metres	18 years, 256 days
Zhou Yang	F	June 9, 1991	February 24, 2010	Short track speed skating	Women's 3000 metre relay	18 years, 260 days
**The 5 oldest gold medalists**
Zhao Hongbo	M	September 22, 1973	February 15, 2010	Figure skating	Pair skating	36 years, 146 days
Xu Mengtao	F	July 12, 1990	February 14, 2022	Freestyle skiing	Women's aerials	31 years, 217 days
Qi Guangpu	M	October 20, 1990	February 16, 2022	Freestyle skiing	Men's aerials	31 years, 119 days
Shen Xue	F	November 13, 1978	February 15, 2010	Figure skating	Pair skating	31 years, 94 days
Han Cong	M	August 6, 1992	February 19, 2022	Figure skating	Pair skating	29 years, 196 days

== Milestones ==
=== Summer Games ===
- 1st medal : Xu Haifeng, Shooting, 1984
- 1st gold medal : Xu Haifeng, Shooting, 1984
- 10th gold medal : Li Ning, Gymnastics, 1984
- 50th gold medal : Deng Yaping, Table tennis, 1996
- 100th gold medal : Zhang Yining, Table tennis, 2004
- 200th gold medal : Chen Ruolin, Diving, 2012
- 300th gold medal : Chen Meng, Sun Yingsha and Wang Manyu, Table tennis, 2024

=== Winter Games ===
- 1st medal: Ye Qiaobo, Speed skating, 1992
- 1st gold medal : Yang Yang (A), Short track speed skating, 2002
- 10th gold medal : Li Jianrou, Short track speed skating, 2014

== Hosting Olympic logo and mottos ==
=== 2008 Summer Olympics ===
The 2008 Summer Olympics marks the milestone for China, where this was the first time it hosting the Olympic Games. The country's capital, Beijing, was chosen as the host city. The motto of the Olympic Games at that time is One World One Dream (同一个世界 同一个梦想)

=== 2014 Summer Youth Olympics ===
The 2014 Summer Youth Olympics marks the second time China hosted the Olympics, but it was held in Nanjing. Its motto is Share the Games, Share our Dreams (分享青春, 共筑未来)

=== 2022 Winter Olympics ===
The 2022 Winter Olympics marks the third time China hosted the Olympics, and the second time held in Beijing. The motto of this game is Together for a Shared Future (一起向未来) . Its previous motto was Joyful Rendezvous Upon Pure Ice and Snow (纯洁的冰雪 激情的约会)

== Doping ==
At the Olympics, China has been stripped of a total of 3 Olympic medals due to doping; the three were weightlifters Lei Cao, Xiexia Chen, and Chunhong Liu, who were caught doping at the 2008 Beijing Olympics.

A former Chinese doctor named Xue Yinxian has claimed the occurrence of alleged systematic doping of Chinese athletes in the Olympic Games (and other international sport events) in 2012 and 2017. She claims more than 10,000 athletes in China were doped in the systematic Chinese government doping program and that they received performance-enhancing drugs in the 1980s and 1990s. She claims that all international medals (both in the Olympics and other international competitions) that were won by Chinese athletes in the 1980s and 1990s must be revoked. This is contrary to previous statements by the Chinese government that had denied involvement in systematic doping and claimed that athletes doped individually. The International Olympic Committee and World Anti-Doping Agency investigated these allegations with no conclusions or actions taken.

== Disqualified/upgraded medalists ==
=== Disqualified medalists ===
China has had four Olympic medals stripped after disqualifications. Three female weightlifters (Lei Cao, Xiexia Chen, Chunhong Liu) lost their medals from the 2008 Olympics due to doping violations. Additionally, the women's gymnastics team was stripped of a bronze medal from the 2000 Olympics after it was discovered that Dong Fangxiao was underage during the competition.

Medal	Name	Sport	Event	Date
Bronze	Team China	Gymnastics	Women's artistic team all-around	September 19, 2000
Gold	Chen Xiexia	Weightlifting	Women's 48 kg	August 9, 2008
Gold	Liu Chunhong	Weightlifting	Women's 69 kg	August 13, 2008
Gold	Cao Lei	Weightlifting	Women's 75 kg	August 15, 2008

=== Upgraded medalists ===
Original Place	Upgraded Medal	Name	Olympics	Sport	Event	Date
Bronze	Silver	He Yingqiang	Seoul 1988	Weightlifting	Men's 56 kg	September 19, 1988
4th place	Bronze	Liu Shoubin	Seoul 1988	Weightlifting	Men's 56 kg	September 19, 1988
4th place	Bronze	Li Jinhe	Seoul 1988	Weightlifting	Men's 67.5 kg	September 21, 1988
4th place	Bronze	Liu Xuan	Sydney 2000	Gymnastics	Women's artistic individual all-around	September 21, 2000
Bronze	Silver	Tan Zongliang	Beijing 2008	Shooting	Men's 50 metre pistol	August 12, 2008
4th place	Bronze	Sheng Jiang	Beijing 2008	Wrestling	Men's Greco-Roman 60 kg	August 12, 2008
5th place	Bronze	Gong Lijiao	Beijing 2008	Athletics	Women's shot put	August 16, 2008
4th place	Bronze	Song Aimin	Beijing 2008	Athletics	Women's discus throw	August 18, 2008
Bronze	Silver	Zhang Wenxiu	Beijing 2008	Athletics	Women's hammer throw	August 20, 2008
Bronze	Silver	Li Yanfeng	London 2012	Athletics	Women's discus throw	August 4, 2012
4th place	Silver	Gong Lijiao	London 2012	Athletics	Women's shot put	August 6, 2012
5th place	Bronze	Li Ling	London 2012	Athletics	Women's shot put	August 6, 2012
4th place	Bronze	Zhang Wenxiu	London 2012	Athletics	Women's hammer throw	August 10, 2012
Bronze	Silver	Si Tianfeng	London 2012	Athletics	Men's 50 kilometres walk	August 11, 2012
Bronze	Gold	Qieyang Shijie	London 2012	Athletics	Women's 20 kilometres walk	August 11, 2012
4th place	Silver	Liu Hong	London 2012	Athletics	Women's 20 kilometres walk	August 11, 2012
6th place	Bronze	Lü Xiuzhi	London 2012	Athletics	Women's 20 kilometres walk	August 11, 2012
Silver	Gold	Lü Xiaojun	Rio 2016	Weightlifting	Men's 77 kg	August 10, 2016
4th place	Bronze	Team China: Tang Xingqiang; Xie Zhenye; Su Bingtian; Wu Zhiqiang	Tokyo 2020	Athletics	Men's 4 × 100 metres relay	August 6, 2021

== See also ==
- Category:Olympic competitors for China
- List of Olympic medalists for China
- China at the Asian Games
- China at the Paralympics
- Sport in China
- Chinese Olympic politics
- Sports and Olympic Committee of Macau, China
