= Li Xiaoxue =

Chinese hammer thrower (born 1980)

Personal information
- Born: 11 January 1980 (age 46)

Sport
- Sport: Athletics
- Event: Hammer throw

Achievements and titles
- Personal best: 65.67 m (2003)
Medal record
Representing China
Women's athletics
Asian Championships
| Gold medal – first place | 2000 Jakarta | Hammer throw |

Li Xiaoxue (born 11 January 1980) is a Chinese former track and field athlete who competed in the hammer throw. Her highest achievement was a gold medal at the 2000 Asian Athletics Championships, which she won with a throw of 59.02 m (193 ft 7 1/2 in). She succeeded her compatriot Gu Yuan with that title and started a long period of Chinese dominance in that event. Li placed third at the 2001 National Games of China, finishing behind Gu and Liu Yinghui.

Li holds a personal best of 65.67 m (215 ft 5 1/4 in), which she set in Shanghai on 13 June 2003 in her last season of top level competition.

== International competitions ==
| Year | Competition | Venue | Position | Notes |
|---|---|---|---|---|
| 2000 | Asian Championships | Jakarta, Indonesia | 1st | 59.02 m |
