= Athletics at the 2006 Asian Games – Women's hammer throw =

Women's hammer throw at the 2006 Asian Games
- Venue: Khalifa International Stadium
- Date: 8 December 2006
- Competitors: 8 from 6 nations

Medalists
gold medal	Zhang Wenxiu	China
silver medal	Gu Yuan	China
bronze medal	Masumi Aya	Japan

The women's hammer throw competition at the 2006 Asian Games in Doha, Qatar was held on 8 December 2006 at the Khalifa International Stadium.

== Schedule ==
All times are Arabia Standard Time (UTC+03:00)

Date	Time	Event
Friday, 8 December 2006	15:00	Final

== Records ==
Prior to this competition, the existing world, Asian and Games records were as follows.

World Record	Tatyana Lysenko (RUS)	77.80	Tallinn, Estonia	15 August 2006
Asian Record	Zhang Wenxiu (CHN)	73.24	Changsha, China	24 June 2005
Games Record	Gu Yuan (CHN)	70.49	Busan, South Korea	12 October 2002

== Results ==
Rank	Athlete	Attempt						Result	Notes
Rank	Athlete	1	2	3	4	5	6	Result	Notes
1st place, gold medalist(s)	Zhang Wenxiu (CHN)	69.06	68.18	68.03	72.50	74.15	71.86	74.15	AR
2nd place, silver medalist(s)	Gu Yuan (CHN)	X	62.95	65.13	X	60.90	63.37	65.13	
3rd place, bronze medalist(s)	Masumi Aya (JPN)	60.82	61.81	62.67	X	61.17	60.95	62.67	
4	Yuka Murofushi (JPN)	58.18	59.66	59.74	X	X	58.08	59.74	
5	Chang Bok-shim (KOR)	X	55.75	56.73	X	X	X	56.73	
6	Hardeep Kaur (IND)	55.19	56.22	55.87	55.30	56.41	53.21	56.41	
7	Galina Mityaeva (TJK)	47.16	X	43.36	43.67	X	44.29	47.16	
8	Sarah Al-Shatti (KUW)	X	X	X	X	23.92	X	23.92	
