= 2011 Asian Athletics Championships – Women's discus throw =

The women's discus throw at the 2011 Asian Athletics Championships was held at the Kobe Universiade Memorial Stadium on 8 July.

== Results ==
Rank	Athlete	Nationality	#1	#2	#3	#4	#5	#6	Result	Notes
1st place, gold medalist(s)	Sun Taifeng	China	60.89	53.56	59.22	58.56	58.56	59.32	60.89	
2nd place, silver medalist(s)	Ma Xuejun	China	59.67	58.09	x	57.59	55.70	56.85	59.67	
3rd place, bronze medalist(s)	Harwant Kaur	India	x	57.99	x	55.77	57.71	54.82	57.99	
4	Krishna Poonia	India	51.49	53.72	51.97	55.71	54.86	56.23	56.23	
5	Li Wen-Hua	Chinese Taipei	52.98	51.99	53.45	52.59	55.59	x	55.59	
6	Ayumi Takahashi	Japan	48.66	50.59	x	x	51.23	x	51.23	
7	Dwi Ratnawati	Indonesia	43.03	x	43.65	38.84	47.85	49.70	49.70	
8	Yuka Murofushi	Japan	x	x	49.24	x	x	x	49.24	
