= Athletics at the 2006 Asian Games – Women's discus throw =

Women's discus throw

Women's discus throw at the 2006 Asian Games
- Venue: Khalifa International Stadium
- Date: 11 December 2006
- Competitors: 5 from 4 nations

Medalists
gold medal	Song Aimin	China
silver medal	Ma Xuejun	China
bronze medal	Krishna Poonia	India

The women's discus throw competition at the 2006 Asian Games in Doha, Qatar was held on 11 December 2006 at the Khalifa International Stadium.

== Schedule ==
All times are Arabia Standard Time (UTC+03:00)

Date	Time	Event
Monday, 11 December 2006	17:55	Final

== Records ==
Prior to this competition, the existing world, Asian and Games records were as follows.

World Record	Gabriele Reinsch (GDR)	76.80	Neubrandenburg, East Germany	9 July 1988
Asian Record	Xiao Yanling (CHN)	71.68	Beijing, China	14 March 1992
Games Record	Neelam Jaswant Singh (IND)	64.55	Busan, South Korea	10 October 2002

== Results ==
Rank	Athlete	Attempt						Result	Notes
Rank	Athlete	1	2	3	4	5	6	Result	Notes
1st place, gold medalist(s)	Song Aimin (CHN)	55.78	62.17	62.48	60.33	63.24	63.52	63.52	
2nd place, silver medalist(s)	Ma Xuejun (CHN)	61.42	55.45	62.43	61.64	57.67	61.42	62.43	
3rd place, bronze medalist(s)	Krishna Poonia (IND)	X	61.53	58.58	X	X	X	61.53	
4	Yuka Murofushi (JPN)	50.01	51.83	X	49.62	52.26	X	52.26	
5	Padma Nandani Wijesundara (SRI)	44.29	45.65	44.87	X	40.65	X	45.65	
