= 2019 Asian Athletics Championships – Women's hammer throw =

Women's hammer throw at the 2019 Asian Athletics Championships
- Venue: Khalifa International Stadium
- Location: Doha, Qatar
- Dates: 22 April
- Competitors: 6 from 4 nations
- Winning distance: 75.66 m CR, SB

Medalists
gold medal	Wang Zheng	China
silver medal	Luo Na	China
bronze medal	Akane Watanabe	Japan

The women's hammer throw at the 2019 Asian Athletics Championships was held on 22 April.

== Records ==
Records before the 2019 Asian Athletics Championships
Record	Athlete (nation)	Distance (m)	Location	Date
World record	Anita Włodarczyk (POL)	82.98	Warsaw, Poland	28 August 2016
Asian record	Xiao Yanling (CHN)	77.68	Chengdu, China	29 March 2014
Championship record	Wang Zheng (CHN)	72.78	Pune, India	5 July 2013
World leading	Gwen Berry (USA)	76.23	Houston, United States	20 May 2019
Asian leading	Wang Zheng (CHN)	73.59	Zhaoqing, China	7 April 2019

== Results ==
Rank	Name	Nationality	#1	#2	#3	#4	#5	#6	Result	Notes
1st place, gold medalist(s)	Wang Zheng	China	71.22	72.08	x	73.47	73.79	75.66	75.66	CR, SB
2nd place, silver medalist(s)	Luo Na	China	69.08	x	70.83	72.23	x	x	72.23	
3rd place, bronze medalist(s)	Akane Watanabe	Japan	63.54	62.39	62.63	62.50	x	x	63.54	
4	Park Seo-jin	South Korea	61.86	x	60.93	55.25	55.44	x	61.86	PB
5	Hitomi Katsuyama	Japan	57.56	58.69	x	54.65	59.70	57.91	59.70	
6	Panwat Gimsrang	Thailand	54.85	53.40	55.04	x	x	x	55.04	SB
