= 2013 Asian Athletics Championships – Women's hammer throw =

The women's hammer throw at the 2013 Asian Athletics Championships was held at the Shree Shiv Chhatrapati Sports Complex on 5 July.

== Results ==
Rank	Name	Nationality	#1	#2	#3	#4	#5	#6	Result	Notes
1st place, gold medalist(s)	Wang Zheng	China	67.03	70.17	71.93	x	72.78	x	72.78	CR
2nd place, silver medalist(s)	Liu Tingting	China	63.97	65.79	66.38	63.57	67.16	x	67.16	
3rd place, bronze medalist(s)	Masumi Aya	Japan	x	58.30	56.69	62.15	63.41	62.76	63.41	
4	Kang Na-Ru	South Korea	59.84	61.70	x	x	x	x	61.70	
5	Manju Bala	India	x	56.63	58.02	46.62	57.51	56.89	58.02	
6	Gunjan Singh	India	52.08	x	x	x	x	55.05	55.05	
7	Diana Nussupbekova	Kazakhstan	54.28	52.77	x	x	50.14	x	54.28	
8	Loralie Sermona	Philippines	x	49.13	50.45	48.34	50.55	50.02	50.55	
	Ayna Mammedova	Turkmenistan							DNS	
