= Athletics at the 2002 Asian Games – Women's hammer throw =

Women's hammer throw at the 2002 Asian Games
- Venue: Busan Asiad Main Stadium
- Date: 12 October 2002
- Competitors: 9 from 6 nations

Medalists
gold medal	Gu Yuan	China
silver medal	Liu Yinghui	China
bronze medal	Masumi Aya	Japan

The women's hammer throw competition at the 2002 Asian Games in Busan, South Korea was held on 12 October at the Busan Asiad Main Stadium.

== Schedule ==
All times are Korea Standard Time (UTC+09:00)

Date	Time	Event
Saturday, 12 October 2002	14:00	Final

== Records ==
Prior to this competition, the existing world, Asian and Games records were as follows.

World Record	Mihaela Melinte (ROM)	76.07	Rüdlingen, Switzerland	29 August 1999
Asian Record	Gu Yuan (CHN)	71.10	Colombo, Sri Lanka	9 August 2002
Games Record	—	—	—	—

== Results ==
Rank	Athlete	Attempt						Result	Notes
Rank	Athlete	1	2	3	4	5	6	Result	Notes
1st place, gold medalist(s)	Gu Yuan (CHN)	65.81	64.25	67.13	70.49	69.38	64.24	70.49	GR
2nd place, silver medalist(s)	Liu Yinghui (CHN)	63.00	65.02	X	66.73	62.16	X	66.73	
3rd place, bronze medalist(s)	Masumi Aya (JPN)	X	61.30	X	55.48	62.18	60.16	62.18	
4	Hardeep Kaur (IND)	54.52	X	X	52.10	59.36	X	59.36	
5	Huang Chih-feng (TPE)	55.60	X	53.46	58.64	X	56.54	58.64	
6	Yuka Murofushi (JPN)	57.23	X	X	X	X	57.15	57.23	
7	Chang Bok-shim (KOR)	53.25	53.92	54.62	56.80	X	53.99	56.80	
8	Yurita Arianny Arsyad (INA)	50.43	X	49.57	47.60	X	49.95	50.43	
9	Kim Seung-yeon (KOR)	49.16	49.51	X				49.51	
