= 2015 Asian Athletics Championships – Women's hammer throw =

The women's hammer throw event at the 2015 Asian Athletics Championships was held on June 3.

== Results ==
Rank	Name	Nationality	#1	#2	#3	#4	#5	#6	Result	Notes
1st place, gold medalist(s)	Liu Tingting	China	65.41	68.24	61.31	64.75	x	x	68.24	
2nd place, silver medalist(s)	Luo Na	China	x	60.63	x	x	x	64.97	64.97	
3rd place, bronze medalist(s)	Akane Watanabe	Japan	50.08	57.32	57.83	x	58.85	59.39	59.39	
4	Park Hee-soen	South Korea	x	54.44	58.07	58.39	x	x	58.39	
5	Grace Wong Xiu Mei	Malaysia	48.41	48.91	52.43	53.10	52.76	52.19	53.10	
6	Anastasiya Aslanidu	Uzbekistan	x	49.08	50.48	50.29	x	50.64	50.64	
7	Casier Renee Kelly Lee	Malaysia	x	46.45	x	47.80	x	x	47.80	
