= 2009 Asian Athletics Championships – Women's discus throw =

The women's discus throw event at the 2009 Asian Athletics Championships was held at the Guangdong Olympic Stadium on November 13.

== Results ==
Rank	Athlete	Nationality	#1	#2	#3	#4	#5	#6	Result	Notes
1st place, gold medalist(s)	Song Aimin	China	56.36	61.47	60.94	x	63.04	63.90	63.90	
2nd place, silver medalist(s)	Ma Xuejun	China	63.63	60.49	61.73	62.62	62.26	x	63.63	SB
3rd place, bronze medalist(s)	Krishna Poonia	India	49.32	59.84	x	x	55.00	57.18	59.84	SB
4	Yuka Murofushi	Japan	52.41	55.14	52.78	x	54.57	52.60	55.14	
5	Harwant Kaur	India	x	53.61	x	53.83	x	53.82	53.83	
6	Li Wen-hua	Chinese Taipei	x	x	45.75	x	50.27	x	50.27	
7	Juthaporn Krasaeyan	Thailand	46.51	47.85	x	47.59	46.45	48.37	48.37	SB
8	Wan Lay Chi	Singapore	42.52	43.72	44.66	43.78	43.43	45.09	45.09	
	Lee Yeon-kyung	South Korea							DNS	
