= Athletics at the 2018 Asian Games – Women's hammer throw =

Asian Games athletics event

Women's hammer throw at the 2018 Asian Games
- Venue: Gelora Bung Karno Stadium
- Date: 25 August 2018
- Competitors: 9 from 6 nations

Medalists
gold medal	Luo Na	China
silver medal	Wang Zheng	China
bronze medal	Hitomi Katsuyama	Japan

The women's hammer throw competition at the 2018 Asian Games took place on 25 August 2018 at the Gelora Bung Karno Stadium.

== Schedule ==
All times are Western Indonesia Time (UTC+07:00)

Date	Time	Event
Saturday, 25 August 2018	18:40	Final

== Records ==
Prior to this competition, the existing world, Asian and Games records were as follows.

World Record	Anita Włodarczyk (POL)	82.98	Warsaw, Poland	28 August 2016
Asian Record	Wang Zheng (CHN)	77.68	Chengdu, China	29 March 2014
Games Record	Zhang Wenxiu (CHN)	77.33	Incheon, South Korea	28 September 2014

== Results ==
Rank	Athlete	Attempt						Result	Notes
Rank	Athlete	1	2	3	4	5	6	Result	Notes
1st place, gold medalist(s)	Luo Na (CHN)	69.39	71.06	70.95	71.42	70.20	67.08	71.42	
2nd place, silver medalist(s)	Wang Zheng (CHN)	67.76	66.38	70.86	X	X	69.41	70.86	
3rd place, bronze medalist(s)	Hitomi Katsuyama (JPN)	X	61.06	57.90	X	59.82	62.95	62.95	
4	Akane Watanabe (JPN)	56.93	62.45	60.93	X	60.27	X	62.45	
5	Sarita Romit Singh (IND)	59.90	59.26	62.03	60.57	X	X	62.03	
6	Mingkamon Koomphon (THA)	60.47	59.39	61.18	X	X	X	61.18	
7	Park Seo-jin (KOR)	57.40	X	57.03	57.16	59.00	56.98	59.00	
8	Panwat Gimsrang (THA)	55.59	55.26	54.01	54.88	52.61	53.66	55.59	
9	Rania Al-Naji (QAT)	46.34	49.62	X				49.62	
