= 2011 Asian Athletics Championships – Women's hammer throw =

The women's hammer throw competition at the 2011 Asian Athletics Championships was held at the Kobe Universiade Memorial Stadium on 7 July.

== Medalists ==
Gold	Masumi Aya; Japan
Silver	Liu Tingting; China
Bronze	Yuka Murofushi; Japan

== Records ==
Standing records prior to the 2010 European Athletics Championships
World record	Betty Heidler (GER)	79.42	Halle, Germany	21 May 2011
Asian record	Zhang Wenxiu (CHN)	75.65	Fränkisch-Crumbach, Germany	12 June 2011
Championship record	Zhang Wenxiu (CHN)	72.07	Guangzhou, China	2009

== Results ==
=== Final ===
The final was held at 14:30 local time.

Rank	Athlete	Nationality	#1	#2	#3	#4	#5	#6	Result	Notes
1st place, gold medalist(s)	Masumi Aya	Japan	64.59	66.21	65.30	66.78	67.19	x	67.19	
2nd place, silver medalist(s)	Liu Tingting	China	64.61	65.42	65.28	64.64	x	62.03	65.42	
3rd place, bronze medalist(s)	Yuka Murofushi	Japan	60.68	62.18	x	60.95	62.50	x	62.50	
4	Kang Na-ru	South Korea	x	58.29	62.19	62.11	x	62.48	62.48	
5	Tan Song Hwa	Malaysia	51.58	50.31	x	54.44	53.83	x	54.44	
6	Ayna Mammedova	Turkmenistan	x	54.01	x	53.65	x	54.21	54.21	
7	Rose Hwrlinda Inggriana	Indonesia	50.24	50.51	50.65	51.52	49.51	49.82	51.52	
