= Athletics at the 2014 Asian Games – Women's hammer throw =

Women's hammer throw at the 2014 Asian Games
- Venue: Incheon Asiad Main Stadium
- Dates: 28 September 2014
- Competitors: 8 from 7 nations

Medalists
| gold medal | Zhang Wenxiu | China |
| silver medal | Wang Zheng | China |
| bronze medal | Manju Bala | India |

The women's hammer throw event at the 2014 Asian Games was held at the Incheon Asiad Main Stadium, Incheon, South Korea on 28 September. The competition was won by Zhang Wenxiu of China. Zhang was disqualified after testing positive for the prohibited substance zeranol, but the Court of Arbitration for Sport reinstated her on appeal after ruling that the zeranol came from contaminated food.

== Schedule ==
All times are Korea Standard Time (UTC+09:00)

| Date | Time | Event |
|---|---|---|
| Sunday, 28 September 2014 | 18:40 | Final |

== Records ==
Prior to this competition, the existing world, Asian and Games records were as follows.

| World Record | Anita Włodarczyk (POL) | 79.58 | Berlin, Germany | 31 August 2014 |
| Asian Record | Wang Zheng (CHN) | 77.68 | Chengdu, China | 29 March 2014 |
| Games Record | Zhang Wenxiu (CHN) | 74.15 | Doha, Qatar | 8 December 2006 |

== Results ==
| Rank | Athlete | Attempt | | | | | | Result | Notes |
| Rank | Athlete | 1 | 2 | 3 | 4 | 5 | 6 | Result | Notes |
|---|---|---|---|---|---|---|---|---|---|
| 1st place, gold medalist(s) | Zhang Wenxiu (CHN) | 74.14 | 72.56 | 74.27 | 75.96 | 76.20 | 77.33 | 77.33 | GR |
| 2nd place, silver medalist(s) | Wang Zheng (CHN) | 56.35 | 72.58 | 74.16 | 74.00 | 71.31 | X | 74.16 | |
| 3rd place, bronze medalist(s) | Manju Bala (IND) | 60.47 | X | 60.28 | 57.80 | 57.19 | 60.34 | 60.47 | |
| 4 | Masumi Aya (JPN) | 57.14 | X | 58.48 | 59.72 | X | 59.84 | 59.84 | |
| 5 | Kang Na-ru (KOR) | 56.59 | X | 56.97 | 58.70 | 58.80 | 58.35 | 58.80 | |
| 6 | Anastasiya Aslanidu (UZB) | 55.21 | X | 54.29 | 50.01 | 53.87 | 53.86 | 55.21 | |
| 7 | Panwat Gimsrang (THA) | 51.31 | 52.69 | 49.60 | 50.33 | X | 51.92 | 52.69 | |
| 8 | Bashayer Al-Quraishi (QAT) | X | X | X | 38.36 | X | 37.25 | 38.36 | |
