= Wang Zheng (hammer thrower) =

Chinese hammer thrower

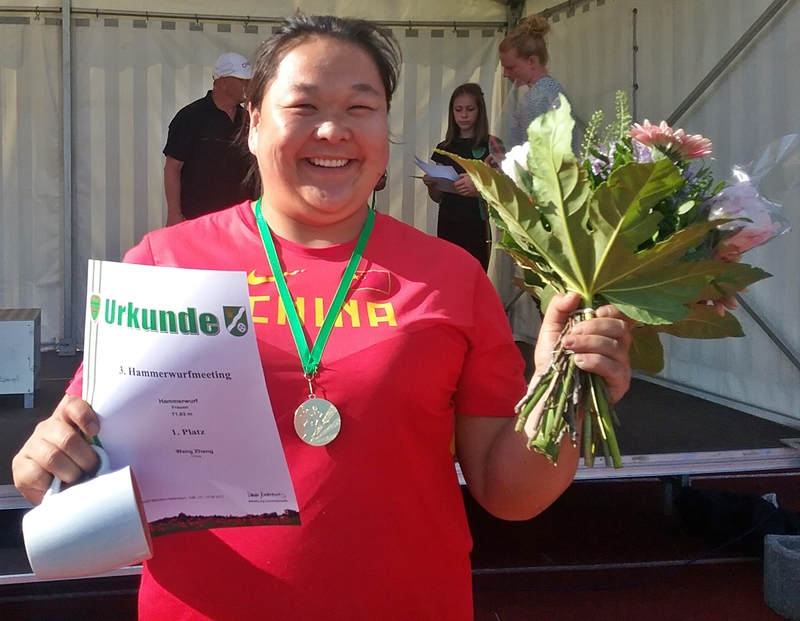
- Wang in 2017

Personal information
- Nationality: Chinese
- Born: 14 December 1987 (age 38) Xi'an, China
- Height: 1.75 m (5 ft 9 in)
- Weight: 105 kg (231 lb)

Sport
- Country: China
- Sport: Athletics
- Event: Hammer throw
Medal record
Women's athletics
Representing China
Olympic Games
Silver medal – second place	2020 Tokyo	Hammer throw
World Championships
Silver medal – second place	2017 London	Hammer throw
Bronze medal – third place	2013 Moscow	Hammer throw
Bronze medal – third place	2019 Doha	Hammer throw
Asian Games
Gold medal – first place	2022 Hangzhou	Hammer throw
Silver medal – second place	2018 Jakarta	Hammer throw
Silver medal – second place	2014 Incheon	Hammer throw
Silver medal – second place	2010 Guangzhou	Hammer throw

Wang Zheng (Chinese: 王峥; born 14 December 1987) is a Chinese hammer thrower. Her personal best throw is 77.68 metres, achieved on 29 March 2014 in Chengdu, which was an Asian record.

She finished second at the 2017 World Championships as well as ninth at the 2006 World Junior Championships. She competed at the 2008 Olympic Games without reaching the final round.

She won the silver medal in women's hammer throw at the 2020 Summer Olympics in Tokyo on 3 August 2021 with her season's best of 77.03 metres.

== International competitions ==
Year	Competition	Venue	Position	Notes
Representing China
2006	Asian Junior Championships	Macau	1st	60.16 m
2006	World Junior Championships	Beijing, China	9th	59.12 m
2008	2008 Summer Olympics	Beijing, China	32nd (q)	65.64 m
2009	East Asian Games	Hong Kong	1st	67.06 m
2010	Asian Games	Guangzhou, China	2nd	68.17 m
2013	Asian Championships	Pune, India	1st	72.78 m
2013	World Championships	Moscow, Russia	3rd	74.90 m
2014	Asian Games	Incheon, South Korea	2nd	74.16 m
2015	World Championships	Beijing, China	5th	73.83 m
2016	Olympic Games	Rio de Janeiro, Brazil	10th (q)	70.60 m
2017	World Championships	London, United Kingdom	2nd	75.98 m
2018	Asian Games	Jakarta, Indonesia	2nd	70.86 m
2019	Asian Championships	Doha, Qatar	1st	75.66 m
2019	World Championships	Doha, Qatar	3rd	74.76 m
2021	Olympic Games	Tokyo, Japan	2nd	77.03 m
2023	World Championships	Budapest, Hungary	8th	72.14 m
2023	Asian Games	Hangzhou, China	1st	71.53 m
2024	Olympic Games	Paris, France	28th (q)	66.92 m
