= Hardeep Kaur =

Indian hammer thrower (born 1977)

Hardeep Kaur (born 17 February 1977) is an Indian hammer thrower.

She grew up in Lehel and took up the hammer throw in 1996. She finished fifth at the 2000 Asian Championships, won the bronze medal at the 2002 Asian Championships , finished fourth at the 2002 Asian Games, fifth at the 2003 Asian Championships, sixth at the 2006 Asian Games, tenth at the 2010 Commonwealth Games and fourth at the 2010 Asian Games. She also competed at the 2002 Commonwealth Games wityhout reaching the final.

She became Indian national champion in 2001, 2002 and 2003. Her personal best throw was 61.67 metres, achieved in September 2002 in New Delhi. She set her first Indian record at the 40th National Open Athletic meet in Kolkata, throwing 58.95 metres to surpass the former record of 58.36 belonging to Jebeshori Devi. More records followed, but Kaur's record was eventually broken in 2014 by Manju Bala reaching 62.74 metres.

She had her first child in 2007. In 2009, she moved to New Zealand to study at the International Pacific College.
