= 2003 Asian Athletics Championships – Women's discus throw =

The women's discus throw event at the 2003 Asian Athletics Championships was held in Manila, Philippines on September 21.

== Results ==
Rank	Name	Nationality	Result	Notes
1st place, gold medalist(s)	Li Yanfeng	China	61.87	SB
2nd place, silver medalist(s)	Neelam Jaswant Singh	India	58.64	
3rd place, bronze medalist(s)	Xu Shaoyang	China	58.13	
4	Harwant Kaur	India	55.89	
5	Yuka Murofushi	Japan	54.08	
6	Tomoko Yamaguchi	Japan	48.83	
7	Ibu Darminah	Indonesia	43.08	PB
8	Oksana Kot	Uzbekistan	42.08	SB
