= Liu Tingting (hammer thrower) =

Chinese hammer thrower (born 1990)

Personal information
- Born: January 29, 1990 (age 36)
- Height: 1.78 m (5 ft 10 in)
- Weight: 87 kg (192 lb)

Sport
- Country: China
- Sport: Track and field
- Event: Hammer throw

Liu Tingting (Chinese: 刘婷婷; born 29 October 1990) is a Chinese hammer thrower. She competed at two World Championships in Athletics, won silver medals at the Asian Athletics Championships of 2011 and 2013 and a bronze medal for her native Liaoning at the 12th National Games of China. Her personal best throw is 69.83 metres (Halle 2013).

== International competitions ==
Year	Competition	Venue	Position	Notes
Representing China
2011	Asian Championships	Kobe, Japan	2nd	65.42 m
2011	World Championships	Daegu, South Korea	29th (q)	63.12 m
2013	Asian Championships	Pune, India	2nd	67.16 m
2013	World Championships	Moscow, Russia	14th (q)	69.68 m
2015	Asian Championships	Wuhan, China	1st	68.24 m
2015	World Championships	Beijing, China	22nd (q)	67.07 m
2016	Olympic Games	Rio de Janeiro, Brazil	16th (q)	69.14 m
2017	Asian Championships	Bhubaneswar, India	2nd	69.45 m
2019	World Championships	Doha, Qatar	25th (q)	67.11 m
