= 2007 Asian Athletics Championships – Women's discus throw =

The women's discus throw event at the 2007 Asian Athletics Championships was held in Amman, Jordan on July 28.

== Results ==
Rank	Name	Nationality	Result	Notes
1st place, gold medalist(s)	Xu Shaoyang	China	61.30	
2nd place, silver medalist(s)	Li Yanfeng	China	61.13	
3rd place, bronze medalist(s)	Krishna Poonia	India	55.38	
4	Harwant Kaur	India	52.43	
5	Li Wen-Hua	Chinese Taipei	49.83	
6	Juttaporn Krasaeyan	Thailand	49.79	
7	Chou Yueh-Ching	Chinese Taipei	49.28	
8	Wan Lay Chi	Singapore	43.06	
	Hiba Omar	Syria	NM	
