= 2017 Asian Athletics Championships – Women's hammer throw =

The women's hammer throw at the 2017 Asian Athletics Championships was held on 7 July.

== Results ==
Rank	Name	Nationality	#1	#2	#3	#4	#5	#6	Result	Notes
1st place, gold medalist(s)	Luo Na	China	x	x	69.92	69.37	68.87	68.53	69.92	
2nd place, silver medalist(s)	Liu Tingting	China	x	65.14	66.52	x	69.45	x	69.45	
3rd place, bronze medalist(s)	Hitomi Katsuyama	Japan	x	56.95	60.22	x	55.54	58.71	60.22	
4	Akane Watanabe	Japan	57.42	59.39	59.39	58.60	x	56.92	59.39	
5	Gunjan Singh	India	58.82	59.19	x	x	x	x	59.19	
6	Sarita Singh	India	57.98	58.71	57.71	x	x	56.37	58.71	
7	Park Hee-soen	South Korea	52.05	56.33	57.82	x	x	x	57.82	
8	Grace Wong	Malaysia	55.55	57.18	56.27	x	56.42	56.52	57.18	
9	Diana Nussupbekova	Kazakhstan	x	52.29	53.93				53.93	
10	Nidhikumari	India	47.52	52.66	x				52.66	
11	H. Al-Enezi	Kuwait	x	25.90	x				25.90	
