= Cao Qi =

Chinese discus thrower (born 1974)

Medal record

Women's athletics

Representing China

Asian Championships
Gold medal – first place	1993 Manila	Discus throw
Silver medal – second place	2000 Jakarta	Discus throw

Cao Qi (Chinese: 曹琪; pinyin: Cáo Qí; born January 15, 1974) is a retired female Chinese discus thrower. Her personal best throw was 66.08 metres, achieved in September 1993 in Beijing. The Chinese and Asian record is currently held by Xiao Yanling with 71.68 metres.

She won the 1993 Asian Championships and won the silver medal at the 2000 Asian Championships. She also competed at the 1999 World Championships and the 2000 Summer Olympics without reaching the final.

== Achievements ==
Year	Competition	Venue	Position	Notes
Representing China
1993	Asian Championships	Manila, Philippines	1st	61.58 m
1998	Goodwill Games	Uniondale, United States	6th	58.51 m
1999	World Championships	Seville, Spain	24th (q)	57.43 m
2000	Asian Championships	Jakarta, Indonesia	2nd	58.71 m
2000	Olympic Games	Sydney, Australia	21st (q)	58.03 m
