= 2005 Asian Athletics Championships – Women's hammer throw =

The women's hammer throw event at the 2005 Asian Athletics Championships was held in Incheon, South Korea on September 3.

== Results ==
| Rank | Name | Nationality | #1 | #2 | #3 | #4 | #5 | #6 | Result | Notes |
|---|---|---|---|---|---|---|---|---|---|---|
| 1st place, gold medalist(s) | Zhang Wenxiu | China | 70.05 | 65.64 | x | 69.91 | x | 69.54 | 70.05 | |
| 2nd place, silver medalist(s) | Gu Yuan | China | | | | | | | 63.89 | |
| 3rd place, bronze medalist(s) | Yuka Murofushi | Japan | | | | | | | 62.62 | |
| 4 | Huang Chih-Feng | Chinese Taipei | | | | | | | 59.66 | |
| 5 | Chisato Ohashi | Japan | | | | | | | 59.40 | |
| 6 | Chang Bok-Shim | South Korea | | | | | | | 53.67 | |
| 7 | Kang Na-Ru | South Korea | | | | | | | 50.96 | |
| 8 | Tan Song Hwa | Malaysia | | | | | | | 49.01 | NJR |
| 9 | Yurita Ariani | Indonesia | | | | | | | 48.69 | |
| 10 | Razia Sultana | Pakistan | | | | | | | 39.70 | |
