= 2002 Asian Athletics Championships – Women's hammer throw =

The women's hammer throw event at the 2002 Asian Athletics Championships was held in Colombo, Sri Lanka on 9 August.

== Results ==
Rank	Name	Nationality	#1	#2	#3	#4	#5	#6	Result	Notes
1st place, gold medalist(s)	Gu Yuan	China	65.41	68.99	70.92	71.10	67.85	66.66	71.10	NR
2nd place, silver medalist(s)	Huang Chih-Feng	Chinese Taipei							58.19	
3rd place, bronze medalist(s)	Hardeep Kaur	India							57.82	
4	Wang Xiaoyu	China							57.00	
5	Aya Suzuki	Japan							54.19	
6	Chang Bok-Shim	South Korea							53.30	
