= 2002 Asian Athletics Championships – Women's discus throw =

The women's discus throw event at the 2002 Asian Athletics Championships was held in Colombo, Sri Lanka on 9 August.

== Results ==
Rank	Name	Nationality	Result	Notes
1st place, gold medalist(s)	Li Yanfeng	China	60.06	
2nd place, silver medalist(s)	Harwant Kaurv	India	57.60	
3rd place, bronze medalist(s)	Swaranjeet Kaur	India	55.05	
4	Won Sun-Mi	South Korea	48.76	
5	Aika Ito	Japan	47.04	
6	Padma Nandani Wijesundara	Sri Lanka	42.87	SB
7	Yeh Nai-Ching	Chinese Taipei	41.81	
8	Bashini Perera	Sri Lanka	37.75	PB
9	Deepika Rodrigo	Sri Lanka	33.90	PB
