= 2003 Asian Athletics Championships – Women's hammer throw =

The women's hammer throw event at the 2003 Asian Athletics Championships was held in Manila, Philippines on September 22.

== Results ==
Rank	Name	Nationality	Result	Notes
1st place, gold medalist(s)	Gu Yuan	China	70.78	
2nd place, silver medalist(s)	Liu Yinghui	China	66.66	
3rd place, bronze medalist(s)	Masumi Aya	Japan	64.04	SB
4	Huang Chih-Feng	Chinese Taipei	59.31	
5	Hardeep Kaur	India	58.18	
6	Ritu Rani	India	53.30	
7	Yurita Ariani Arsyad	Indonesia	50.61	
8	Kruawa Thaweedech	Thailand	46.60	
9	Loralie Amahit	Philippines	45.28	NR
10	Anastasiya Sazhneva	Kazakhstan	43.80	
11	Roselyn Hamero	Philippines	39.04	PB
12	Dulamsuren Deren	Mongolia	31.33	PB
