= Athletics at the 2010 Asian Games – Women's hammer throw =

Women's hammer throw at the 2010 Asian Games
- Venue: Aoti Main Stadium
- Date: 22 November 2010
- Competitors: 7 from 5 nations

Medalists
gold medal	Zhang Wenxiu	China
silver medal	Wang Zheng	China
bronze medal	Yuka Murofushi	Japan

The women's hammer throw event at the 2010 Asian Games was held at the Aoti Main Stadium, Guangzhou, China on 22 November.

== Schedule ==
All times are China Standard Time (UTC+08:00)

Date	Time	Event
Monday, 22 November 2010	17:10	Final

== Records ==
Prior to this competition, the existing world, Asian and Games records were as follows.

World Record	Anita Włodarczyk (POL)	78.30	Bydgoszcz, Poland	6 June 2010
Asian Record	Zhang Wenxiu (CHN)	74.86	Shijiazhuang, China	3 August 2007
Games Record	Zhang Wenxiu (CHN)	74.15	Doha, Qatar	8 December 2006

== Results ==
Rank	Athlete	Attempt						Result	Notes
Rank	Athlete	1	2	3	4	5	6	Result	Notes
1st place, gold medalist(s)	Zhang Wenxiu (CHN)	67.44	66.42	72.26	70.88	72.84	72.04	72.84	
2nd place, silver medalist(s)	Wang Zheng (CHN)	63.83	68.17	X	66.79	63.38	66.59	68.17	
3rd place, bronze medalist(s)	Yuka Murofushi (JPN)	60.25	X	62.94	62.04	X	59.61	62.94	
4	Hardeep Kaur (IND)	X	56.99	60.54	59.09	58.23	58.00	60.54	
5	Park Hee-soen (KOR)	57.53	55.99	X	51.89	X	54.14	57.53	
6	Kang Na-ru (KOR)	X	56.85	X	X	X	56.77	56.85	
7	Aýna Mamedowa (TKM)	X	50.60	X	49.68	X	48.55	50.60	
