= Athletics at the 2010 Asian Games – Women's discus throw =

Women's discus throw at the 2010 Asian Games
- Venue: Aoti Main Stadium
- Date: 23 November 2010
- Competitors: 7 from 5 nations

Medalists
gold medal	Li Yanfeng	China
silver medal	Song Aimin	China
bronze medal	Krishna Poonia	India

The women's discus throw event at the 2010 Asian Games was held at the Aoti Main Stadium, Guangzhou, China on 23 November.

== Schedule ==
All times are China Standard Time (UTC+08:00)

Date	Time	Event
Tuesday, 23 November 2010	17:20	Final

== Records ==
Prior to this competition, the existing world, Asian and Games records were as follows.

World Record	Gabriele Reinsch (GDR)	76.80	Neubrandenburg, East Germany	9 July 1988
Asian Record	Xiao Yanling (CHN)	71.68	Beijing, China	14 March 1992
Games Record	Neelam Jaswant Singh (IND)	64.55	Busan, South Korea	10 October 2002

== Results ==
Rank	Athlete	Attempt						Result	Notes
Rank	Athlete	1	2	3	4	5	6	Result	Notes
1st place, gold medalist(s)	Li Yanfeng (CHN)	X	66.18	62.48	X	60.81	62.42	66.18	GR
2nd place, silver medalist(s)	Song Aimin (CHN)	61.79	58.91	59.34	64.04	59.31	63.51	64.04	
3rd place, bronze medalist(s)	Krishna Poonia (IND)	61.94	61.13	58.55	59.79	X	58.30	61.94	
4	Harwant Kaur (IND)	55.97	57.55	X	54.85	X	56.69	57.55	
5	Li Wen-hua (TPE)	X	X	X	X	51.12	55.42	55.42	
6	Yuka Murofushi (JPN)	50.18	49.76	48.47	50.28	50.16	50.26	50.28	
7	Wan Lay Chi (SIN)	41.08	44.67	43.08	44.96	43.54	42.77	44.96	
