= 2005 Asian Athletics Championships – Women's discus throw =

The women's discus throw event at the 2005 Asian Athletics Championships was held in Incheon, South Korea on September 2.

== Results ==
Rank	Name	Nationality	#1	#2	#3	#4	#5	#6	Result	Notes
1st place, gold medalist(s)	Song Aimin	China	62.14	x	62.31	61.93	65.15	64.51	65.15	CR
2nd place, silver medalist(s)	Sun Taifeng	China							59.09	
3rd place, bronze medalist(s)	Krishna Poonia	India							57.67	
4	Yuka Murofushi	Japan							56.23	SB
5	Seema Antil	India							53.41	
6	Won Sun-Mi	South Korea							49.79	SB
7	Oksana Kot	Uzbekistan							48.32	
8	Du Xianhui	Singapore							46.40	
9	Hong Lei Lei	Macau							37.62	
