= Kang Na-ru =

South Korean hammer thrower (born 1983)

Kang Na-ru (Korean: 강나루; born 25 April 1983) is a South Korean hammer thrower.

She won the bronze medal at the 2002 Asian Junior Championships, finished seventh at the 2005 Asian Championships and won the silver medal at the 2007 Asian Championships.

She subsequently finished fifth at the 2009 Asian Championships, sixth at the 2010 Asian Games, fourth at the 2011 Asian Championships, fourth at the 2013 Asian Championships and fifth at the 2014 Asian Games. She also competed at the 2011 World Championships on home soil without reaching the final.

She became South Korean national champion in 2007, 2008, 2009, 2010, 2012, 2013, 2014 and 2015. Her personal best throw was 63.80 metres, achieved in May 2012 in Daegu. She set several South Korean records during her career. Her latest record has however later been broken.
