= 2009 Asian Athletics Championships – Women's hammer throw =

The women's hammer throw event at the 2009 Asian Athletics Championships was held at the Guangdong Olympic Stadium on November 11.

== Results ==
Rank	Athlete	Nationality	#1	#2	#3	#4	#5	#6	Result	Notes
1st place, gold medalist(s)	Zhang Wenxiu	China	71.16	72.07	71.63	70.32	x	70.23	72.07	
2nd place, silver medalist(s)	Hao Shuai	China	64.41	63.64	65.11	65.87	64.17	x	65.87	
3rd place, bronze medalist(s)	Yuka Murofushi	Japan	x	59.73	61.99	60.39	60.63	60.79	61.99	
4	Galina Mityaeva	Tajikistan	57.68	x	x	x	56.24	x	57.68	
5	Kang Na-ru	South Korea	56.57	x	x	x	x	x	56.57	
6	Sukanya Mishra	India	49.86	54.02	51.83	53.74	52.45	55.30	55.30	
7	Tan Song Hwa	Malaysia	53.27	53.59	x	54.19	53.00	50.04	54.19	
