= 2000 Asian Athletics Championships – Women's hammer throw =

The women's hammer throw event at the 2000 Asian Athletics Championships was held in Jakarta, Indonesia on 28 August.

== Results ==
Rank	Name	Nationality	#1	#2	#3	#4	#5	#6	Result	Notes
1st place, gold medalist(s)	Li Xiaoxue	China	56.09	58.88	56.87	58.08	59.02	58.41	59.02	
2nd place, silver medalist(s)	Yuka Murofushi	Japan	56.05	56.59	58.64	58.07	x	x	58.64	
3rd place, bronze medalist(s)	Masumi Aya	Japan	55.97	x	55.30	55.66	54.15	x	55.97	
4	Jebeshori Devi	India							55.68	
5	Hardeep Kaur	India							54.77	
6	Wong Shu-Chuan	Chinese Taipei							52.22	
7	Jang Bok-Shim	South Korea							51.68	NR
8	Yurita Ariani Arsyad	Indonesia							44.59	
9	Nia Meilani	Indonesia							43.17	
10	Siti Shahidah Abdullah	Malaysia							42.38	
