= Masumi Aya =

Japanese hammer thrower (born 1980)

Medal record

Women's athletics

Representing Japan

Asian Championships
Bronze medal – third place	2000 Jakarta	Hammer throw
Bronze medal – third place	2003 Manila	Hammer throw

Masumi Aya (綾 真澄, Aya Masumi; born 1 January 1980) is a Japanese hammer thrower. Her personal best throw is 67.26 metres, achieved in August 2006 in Toyama.

== International competitions ==
Representing Japan
Year	Competition	Venue	Position	Notes
1999	Asian Junior Championships	Singapore	2nd	52.22 m
2000	Asian Championships	Jakarta, Indonesia	3rd	55.97 m
2001	East Asian Games	Osaka, Japan	3rd	60.27 m
2001	World Championships	Edmonton, Canada	29th (q)	58.84 m
2002	Asian Games	Busan, South Korea	3rd	62.18 m
2003	World Championships	Paris, France	34th (q)	60.78 m
2003	Asian Championships	Manila, Philippines	3rd	64.04 m
2006	Asian Games	Doha, Qatar	3rd	62.67 m
2007	World Championships	Osaka, Japan	32nd (q)	62.68 m
2009	East Asian Games	Hong Kong, China	2nd	59.56 m
2011	Asian Championships	Kobe, Japan	1st	67.19 m
2011	World Championships	Daegu, South Korea	27th (q)	64.09 m
2013	Asian Championships	Pune, India	3rd	63.41 m
2014	Asian Games	Incheon, South Korea	4th	59.84 m
