= Chinese Olympic politics =

This narrow-focus article concerns Chinese Olympic politics only. This is the politics, historical and present-day, surrounding the participation in the Olympics of the Chinese Olympic Team, the Chinese Taipei Olympic Team and to a much lesser extent the Hong Kong Olympic Team. This article is not concerned with Sport.

== History ==
Though China entered international sports affairs and initiated a relationship with the IOC as early as May 1915, it did not actually participate in the Olympic Games until 1932. After a long civil war between communists and nationalists (KMT), which intensified after the end of World War II, the People's Republic of China (PRC) was established on 1 October 1949. The defeated KMT "Republic of China" (ROC) government evacuated to the island of Formosa, now known as Taiwan. Thus, from this time in history, the ROC and the PRC have each fielded rival teams and this has led to a series of historical incidents in international and IOC affairs.

== 1958 Olympics ==
The PRC withdrew from the IOC and from all international sports federations in 1958. The PRC decision taken in 1958 prompted its absence from the Olympic Movement for a period of 25 years.

== PRC re-emerges on Sporting stage ==
The PRC began its return to the IOC in 1971 by resuming participation in the Asian Games. Some members of the IOC supported integrating the PRC into the Olympic movement. In September at the 71st IOC Session in Luxembourg, PRC participation was raised as an issue. However, the response received was that the IOC was ready to welcome all NOCs whose statutes conformed to IOC rules (including, for the PRC, accepting that the Republic of China also had an Olympic team). This was unacceptable to the PRC.

Early in 1973, the Japanese Olympic Committee began writing to various international federations and National Olympic Committees calling for the PRC's reinstatement in the IOC. The Japanese Olympic Committee sought the expulsion of the ROC.

In October 1973, the Asian Games Federation voted to admit the PRC to the Teheran Asian Games and to expel the ROC. At the IOC Congress in Varna in October 1973, one of the main topics of discussion dealt with the inclusion of the PRC in the Olympic Games and its return to the international sporting world.

The IOC's reaction to the decision taken by the Asian Games Federation:

  In order to have IOC-patronage the Asian Games Organizing
  Committees had to invite all NOCs in their area. It was also an
  IOC-rule stating that a nation without an NOC could not be invited.
  Evidently the PRC was going to be invited, but not the Republic of
  China (Taiwan). (21)

The question of the PRC's IOC membership, however, did not gain prominence until April 9, 1975. At the IOC Session in Lausanne, the PRC made a formal application for recognition as "the sole sports organization representing the whole of China." At the same time, the PRC set a condition that Taiwan should be excluded.

At the IOC Executive Committee meeting in Rome in May 1975, a formal request for the admission of the PRC NOC was presented to the IOC by the Iranian NOC. The IOC member from Taiwan, Henry Hsu, in regard to the PRC application, was in favour of admitting China provided that it met the provisions of the Olympic Rules. On the question of the PRC demand that Taiwan be expelled, Hsu reminded his fellow IOC members of several points: (1) that never before had an applicant set prior conditions for acceptance by the IOC; (2) that the PRC did not control sport in Taiwan; (3) that the IOC had granted recognition to other divided states (Germany and Korea), and (4) that only when an NOC had broken the rules could it be expelled.

In early May 1975, the PRC issued a statement:

  ... any attempt to resolve the conflict by changing the name of the
  ROC (Taiwan) committee, or keeping Taiwan in the IOC as separate
  state, or by inviting the PRC and yet not expelling Taiwan, would
  be unacceptable interference in the internal affairs of the Chinese
  people. (31)

Finally the decision was made as follows: "An IOC-delegation headed by the President should visit China. In the absence of sufficient information there would be no vote taken during the Session." (32)

On 1 November 1975, the Iranian NOC intensified its campaign. They pointed out, "No vote was ever held on the acceptance of an NOC in Taiwan during the early years after the founding of the PRC." (34)

== Montreal 1976 ==
The 1976 Olympics were awarded to Montreal in May 1970. On 23 May 1975, in response to a question as to whether or not the government would support the participation of both Chinas at the 1976 Summer Games, Canadian officials stated that "these decisions have to be made by the International Olympic Committee. We are the host for the games but we do not decide who participates." (37) Beijing had formally requested that the Canadian Government bar unconditionally the entry of the Taiwanese delegation. Canada refused to do this, (38) on the condition that Taiwan compete in the Olympics without reference to the word "China," a condition that applied to Taiwan's participation in the 1960 Games in Rome. (39) At that time (1960), Taiwan participated as the representative of Taiwan and not as the representative of the Republic of China. (40) That situation included not using "the flag, anthem, or any symbol of the 'Republic of China' or use team designation that includes the word China," (41) because: "we (Canada) recognize the PRC and we are not under this guise proposing to import into our foreign policy a two-China policy."

The Canadian Government did not reveal its position until the end of May 1976. In a reply to the Canadian stance, the IOC issued a statement in Lausanne:

  The Canadian position is in direct conflict with fundamental
  Olympic principles and that Montreal would never have been awarded
  the Games ... if Canada had not given assurances that athletes from
  all National Olympic Committees recognized by the IOC would be
  allowed to attend. (43)

As part of its bid to host the 1976 Olympics, Canada has pledged to admit any teams that represent the National Olympic Committees and National Sports Federations that the IOC recognizes. However, there was a clause added to this agreement reserving "the normal regulations," which turned out to be the Canadian position that no country could represent another nation that Canada had relations. In the end, China was not admitted in time so Taiwan participated using the name 'Republic of China.'

A string of negotiations finally resolved the participation of China and Taiwan in 1981. It was agreed that PRC's NOC would be recognized as the Chinese Olympic Committee while the Taiwan NOC was to be known as the Chinese Taipei Olympic Committee. Later, in a 1989 accord, China and Taiwan agreed to name the Taiwanese Olympic delegation as "zhonghua taibei" (Chinese Taipei) instead of "zhongguo taiwan" or "zhongguo taibei." The Taiwanese acceded because the term zhongguo taibei makes Taiwan part of China while zhonghua taibei does not. On the other hand, China was content with the term because it acknowledged Chinese ethnic background and did not use taiwan, which is a national identifier.

== Hong Kong ==
Hong Kong has had a distinct National Olympic Committee since 1950 and has competed at the Games since 1952. After the territory was returned to the PRC and the Hong Kong Special Administrative Region was created in 1997, this arrangement has continued, with Hong Kong competing independently from the rest of the nation.
