= 2000 Asian Athletics Championships – Women's discus throw =

The women's discus throw event at the 2000 Asian Athletics Championships was held in Jakarta, Indonesia on 28 August.

== Results ==
Rank	Name	Nationality	#1	#2	#3	#4	#5	#6	Result	Notes
1st place, gold medalist(s)	Neelam Jaswant Singh	India	58.90	58.44	60.30	60.21	57.75	60.75	60.75	
2nd place, silver medalist(s)	Cao Qi	China	57.97	57.60	58.71	x	x	53.67	58.71	
3rd place, bronze medalist(s)	Li Yanfeng	China	57.52	57.52	43.74	54.85	x	51.70	57.52	
4	Harwant Kaur	India							56.08	
5	Yuka Murofushi	Japan							53.14	
6	Won Soon-Mi	South Korea							47.23	
7	Ibu Darminah	Indonesia							45.22	
