= Xu Shaoyang =

Chinese discus thrower (born 1983)

Medal record

Women's athletics

Representing China

Asian Championships
Gold medal – first place	2007 Amman	Discus throw
Bronze medal – third place	2003 Manila	Discus throw

Xu Shaoyang (born 9 February 1983) is a Chinese discus thrower. Her personal best is 63.29 metres, achieved in October 2008 in Shijiazhuang.

She was born in Shandong. She was very successful as a teenager, as she won the gold medal at the 2000 World Junior Championships and the silver medal at the 2002 World Junior Championships. Her personal best as a teenager was 62.54 metres, achieved in October 2002 in Bangkok.

In 2003, she won the bronze medals at the 2003 Asian Championships and at the 2003 Summer Universiade. At the 2007 Asian Championships she won the gold medal. She also competed at the 2009 World Championships without reaching the final.

== Competition record ==
Year	Competition	Venue	Position	Notes
Representing China
2000	World Junior Championships	Santiago, Chile	1st	54.41 m
2002	World Junior Championships	Kingston, Jamaica	2nd	57.87 m
2003	Universiade	Daegu, South Korea	3rd	58.64 m
2003	Asian Championships	Manila, Philippines	3rd	58.13 m
2007	Asian Championships	Amman, Jordan	1st	61.30 m
2009	World Championships	Berlin, Germany	13th (q)	61.02 m
2009	East Asian Games	Hong Kong	2nd	56.04 m
