= Li Wen-hua =

Taiwanese discus thrower

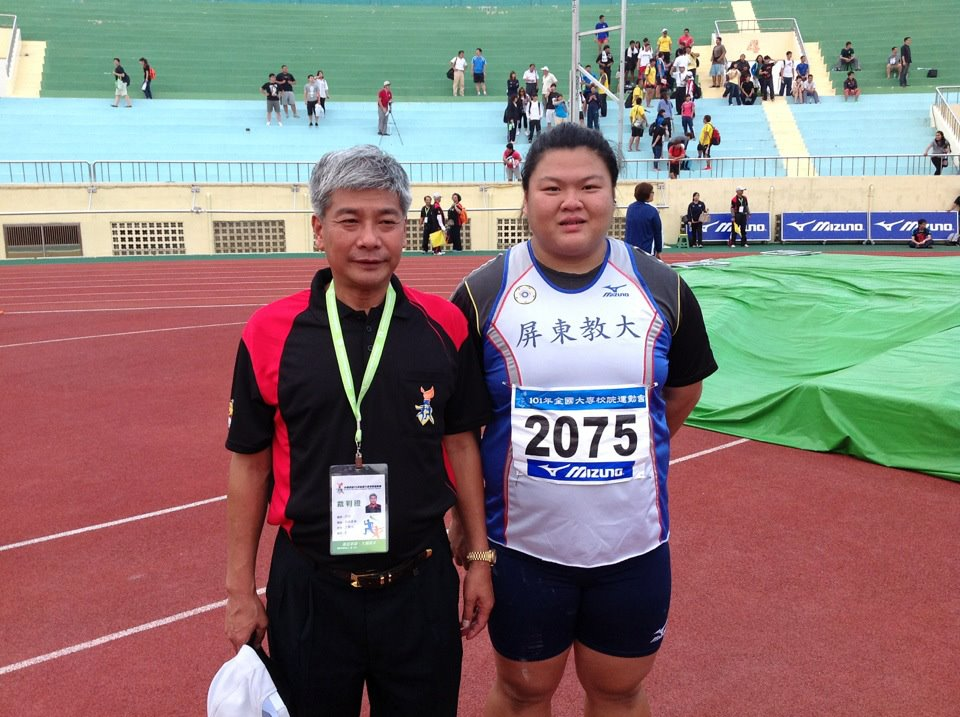
- Li (right) with Wang Ching-cheng in 2012

Personal information
- Born: 3 December 1989 (age 36)
- Height: 1.80 m (5 ft 11 in)
- Weight: 130 kg (290 lb)

Sport
- Country: Chinese Taipei
- Sport: Athletics
- Event: Discus
- Updated on 14 August 2012

Li Tsai-yi (Chinese: 李采懌; born 3 December 1989 as Li Wen-hua 李文華, Kaohsiung City) is a Taiwanese athlete. She competed for Chinese Taipei in discus at the 2012 Summer Olympics.

== Competition record ==
Year	Competition	Venue	Position	Event	Notes
Representing Chinese Taipei
2006	Asian Junior Championships	Ipoh, Malaysia	4th	Discus throw	46.97 m
2006	World Junior Championships	Beijing, China	22nd (q)	Discus throw	43.33 m
2007	Asian Championships	Amman, Jordan	5th	Discus throw	49.83 m
2008	Asian Junior Championships	Jakarta, Indonesia	3rd	Discus throw	52.15 m
2008	World Junior Championships	Bydgoszcz, Poland	12th	Discus throw	47.08 m
2009	Universiade	Belgrade, Serbia	15th (q)	Discus throw	50.68 m
2009	World Championships	Berlin, Germany	34th (q)	Discus throw	53.88 m
2009	East Asian Games	Hong Kong	3rd	Discus throw	55.35 m
2010	Asian Games	Guangzhou, China	5th	Discus throw	55.42 m
2011	Asian Championships	Kobe, Japan	5th	Discus throw	55.59 m
2012	Olympic Games	London, United Kingdom	22nd (q)	Discus throw	59.91 m
2013	Asian Championships	Pune, India	3rd	Discus throw	55.32 m
