= Luo Na =

Chinese hammer thrower (born 1993)

Personal information
- Nationality: Chinese
- Born: 8 October 1993 (age 32)

Sport
- Sport: Athletics
- Event: Hammer throw

Luo Na (born 8 October 1993) is a Chinese hammer thrower. She competed in the women's hammer throw at the 2017 World Championships in Athletics.

== International competitions ==
Year	Competition	Venue	Position	Notes
Representing China
2017	Asian Championships	Bhubaneswar, India	1st	69.92 m
2017	World Championships	London, United Kingdom	13th (q)	69.54 m
2018	Asian Games	Jakarta, Indonesia	1st	71.42 m
2019	Asian Championships	Doha, Qatar	2nd	72.23 m
2019	World Championships	Doha, Qatar	8th	72.04 m
2021	Olympic Games	Tokyo, Japan	15th (q)	69.86 m
2022	World Championships	Eugene, United States	8th	70.42 m
