= Ma Xuejun =

Chinese discus thrower (born 1985)

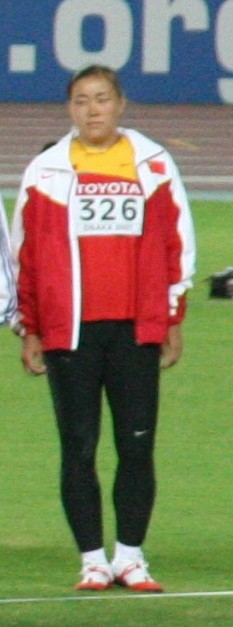
- Ma Xuejun in 2007

Personal information
- Born: March 26, 1985 (age 41) Shandong, China
- Height: 1.84 m (6 ft 1/2 in)
- Weight: 100 kg (220 lb)

Sport
- Country: China
- Sport: Athletics
- Event: Discus
- Updated on 14 August 2012

Ma Xuejun (Chinese: 马雪君; born 26 March 1985) is a Chinese discus thrower. Her personal best throw is 65.00 metres, first achieved in August 2006 in Shijiazhuang. The Chinese, and Asian, record is currently held by Xiao Yanling with 71.68 metres.

She was successful on junior level, winning both the 2001 World Youth Championships, the 2002 World Junior Championships and the 2004 World Junior Championships. Her first medal on senior level was a silver medal at the 2006 Asian Games. She then finished eight at the 2007 World Championships.

== Achievements ==
Year	Competition	Venue	Position	Notes
Representing China
2001	World Youth Championships	Debrecen, Hungary	1st	54.93 m
2002	World Junior Championships	Kingston, Jamaica	1st	58.85 m
2004	World Junior Championships	Grosseto, Italy	1st	57.85 m
2006	Asian Games	Doha, Qatar	2nd	62.43 m
2007	World Championships	Osaka, Japan	8th	59.37 m
2008	Olympic Games	Beijing, China	22nd (q)	58.45 m
2009	World Championships	Berlin, Germany	11th	58.79 m
2009	Asian Championships	Guangzhou, China	2nd	63.63 m
2011	World Championships	Daegu, South Korea	14th (q)	59.71 m
2011	Asian Championships	Kobe, Japan	2nd	59.67 m
2012	Olympic Games	London, United Kingdom	10th	61.02 m
