= Manju Bala =

Indian hammer thrower (born 1989)

Personal information
- Born: 1 July 1989 (age 37) Churu, Rajasthan, India
- Occupation: Income Tax Inspector
- Employer: Income Tax Department

Sport
- Sport: Track and field
- Event: Hammer throw

Achievements and titles
- Personal best: 64.88 m (2021)
Medal record
Women's athletics
Representing India
Asian Games
Bronze medal – third place	2014 Incheon	Hammer throw

Manju Bala (born 1 July 1989) is an Indian former track and field athlete who specialized in hammer throw. She won the bronze medal in the women's hammer throw event at the 2014 Asian Games.
