= Sun Taifeng =

Chinese discus thrower (born 1982)

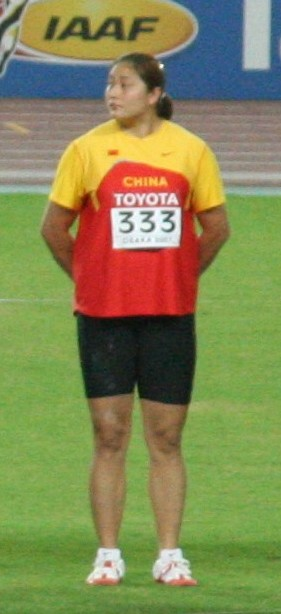
- Sun Taifeng in 2007

Medal record

Women's athletics

Representing China

Asian Championships
Silver medal – second place	2005 Incheon	Discus throw

Sun Taifeng (simplified Chinese: 孙太凤; traditional Chinese: 孫太鳳; pinyin: Sūn Tàifèng, born 26 August 1982) is a Chinese discus thrower.

She won the silver medal at the 2005 Asian Championships and finished fourth at the 2007 World Championships.

Her personal best throw is 64.98 metres, achieved in June 2007 in Suzhou. The Chinese, and Asian, record is currently held by Xiao Yanling with 71.68 metres.
