= Gu Yuan =

Chinese hammer thrower (born 1982)

Medal record

Women's athletics

Representing China

Asian Championships
Gold medal – first place	1998 Fukuoka	Hammer throw
Gold medal – first place	2002 Colombo	Hammer throw
Gold medal – first place	2003 Manila	Hammer throw
Silver medal – second place	2005 Incheon	Hammer throw

Gu Yuan (simplified Chinese: 顾原; traditional Chinese: 顧原; pinyin: Gù Yuán; born May 9, 1982) is a female hammer thrower from the People's Republic of China (PRC). She was born in Yingkou, Liaoning. Her personal best throw is 72.36 metres, achieved in July 2004 in Padua.

== International competitions ==
Year	Competition	Venue	Position	Notes
Representing China
1998	Asian Championships	Fukuoka, Japan	1st	61.86 m
2002	Asian Championships	Colombo, Sri Lanka	1st	71.10 m
2002	World Cup	Madrid, Spain	1st	70.75 m
2002	Asian Games	Busan, South Korea	1st	70.49 m
2003	World Championships	Paris, France	4th	70.77 m
2003	Asian Championships	Manila, Philippines	1st	70.78 m
2004	Olympic Games	Athens, Greece	10th	69.76 m
2005	World Championships	Helsinki, Finland	—	NM
2005	Asian Championships	Incheon, South Korea	2nd	63.89 m
2006	Asian Games	Doha, Qatar	2nd	65.13 m
2007	Universiade	Bangkok, Thailand	16th	58.03 m
