= Song Aimin =

Chinese discus thrower (born 1978)

Medal record

Women's athletics

Representing China

Asian Championships
Gold medal – first place	2005 Incheon	Discus throw

Song Aimin (Chinese: 宋爱民; pinyin: Sòng Àimín, born February 7, 1978, in Hengshui) is a Chinese discus thrower. Her personal best throw is 65.44 meters, achieved in October 2009 at Jinan Chinese National Games. The Chinese, and Asian, record is currently held by Xiao Yanling with 71.68 meters.

== Achievements ==
Year	Competition	Venue	Position	Notes
Representing China
1997	Asian Junior Championships	Bangkok, Thailand	1st	55.84 m
2002	Asian Games	Busan, South Korea	2nd	61.80 m
2003	World Championships	Paris, France	7th	63.84 m
2003	Afro-Asian Games	Hyderabad, India	3rd	58.41 m
2004	Olympic Games	Athens, Greece	25th (q)	58.19 m
2005	World Championships	Helsinki, Finland	10th	57.90 m
2005	Universiade	İzmir, Turkey	2nd	61.74 m
2005	Asian Championships	Incheon, South Korea	1st	65.15 m
2005	East Asian Games	Macau	1st	64.32 m
2006	World Cup	Athens, Greece	3rd	61.47 m
2006	Asian Games	Doha, Qatar	1st	63.52 m
2007	World Championships	Osaka, Japan	14th (q)	60.10 m
2008	Olympic Games	Beijing, China	3rd	62.20 m
2009	World Championships	Berlin, Germany	5th	62.42 m
2009	Asian Championships	Guangzhou, China	1st	63.90 m
2010	Asian Games	Guangzhou, China	2nd	64.04 m
