= Li Yanfeng =

Chinese discus thrower (born 1979)

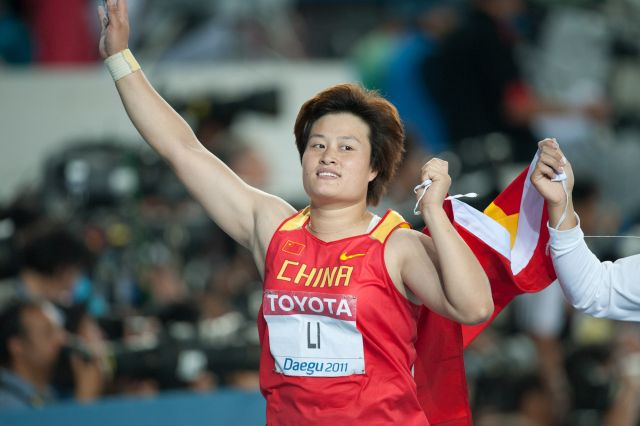
- Li Yanfeng during 2011 World championships Athletics in Daegu

Personal information
- Nationality: Chinese
- Born: May 15, 1979 (age 47) Heilongjiang, China
- Height: 1.79 m (5 ft 10 1/2 in)
- Weight: 93 kg (205 lb)

Achievements and titles
- World finals: 2011 World Championships: 66.52 – Gold
- Personal best: Discus Throw: 67.98 (2011)
Medal record
Women's athletics
Representing China
Olympic Games
Silver medal – second place	2012 London	Discus throw
World Championships
Gold medal – first place	2011 Daegu	Discus throw
Asian Games
Gold medal – first place	2010 Guangzhou	Discus throw
Asian Championships
Gold medal – first place	2002 Colombo	Discus throw
Gold medal – first place	2003 Manila	Discus throw
Silver medal – second place	2007 Amman	Discus throw
Bronze medal – third place	2000 Jakarta	Discus throw

Li Yanfeng
- Traditional Chinese: 李艷鳳
- Simplified Chinese: 李艳凤
Transcriptions
Standard Mandarin
- Hanyu Pinyin: Lǐ Yànfèng
- Wade–Giles: Li Yenfeng
Yue: Cantonese
- Jyutping: Lei5 Jim6fung6

Li Yanfeng (simplified Chinese: 李艳凤; traditional Chinese: 李艷鳳; pinyin: Lǐ Yànfèng, born May 15, 1979) is a Chinese discus thrower. Li won China's first discus world title.

Her personal best throw is 67.98 metres, achieved in June 2011 in Schönebeck. The Chinese, and Asian, record is currently held by Xiao Yanling with 71.68 metres.

== Achievements ==
Year	Competition	Venue	Position	Notes
Representing China
1999	World Championships	Seville, Spain	19th (q)	59.47 m
2000	Asian Championships	Jakarta, Indonesia	3rd	57.52 m
2001	Universiade	Beijing, China	2nd	60.50 m
2002	Asian Championships	Colombo, Sri Lanka	1st	60.06 m
2002	World Cup	Madrid, Spain	4th	59.89 m
2003	Universiade	Daegu, South Korea	2nd	61.12 m
2003	Asian Championships	Manila, Philippines	1st	61.87 m
2003	Afro-Asian Games	Hyderabad, India	2nd	60.42 m
2004	Olympic Games	Athens, Greece	8th	61.05 m
2007	Asian Championships	Amman, Jordan	2nd	61.13 m
2008	Olympic Games	Beijing, China	7th	60.68 m
2009	East Asian Games	Hong Kong	1st	64.66 m
2010	Continental Cup	Split, Croatia	1st	63.79 m
2010	Asian Games	Guangzhou, China	1st	66.18 m
2011	World Championships	Daegu, South Korea	1st	66.52 m
2012	Olympic Games	London, United Kingdom	2nd	67.22 m

- Li originally finished 3rd in the 2012 Summer Olympics, but she moved up a position after Darya Pishchalnikova was disqualified for testing positive for the anabolic steroid oxandrolone.

== See also ==
- China at the 2012 Summer Olympics - Athletics

Sporting positions
Preceded by (Belarus) Iryna Yatchenko	Women's Discus Best Year Performance; 2009	Succeeded by (Germany) Nadine Müller
Preceded by (Germany) Nadine Müller	Women's Discus Best Year Performance; 2011	Succeeded by (Croatia) Sandra Perković
