= Liu Yinghui =

Chinese hammer thrower

Liu Yinghui (刘瑛慧)
Personal information
- Born: June 29, 1979 (age 47)
Medal record
Women's athletics
Representing China
Asian Championships
Silver medal – second place	2003 Manila	Hammer throw

Liu Yinghui (simplified Chinese: 刘瑛慧; traditional Chinese: 劉瑛慧; pinyin: Liú Yīnghuì; born June 29, 1978) is a Chinese hammer thrower.

At the 2004 Summer Olympic she was eliminated in the first round of the hammer throw competition.

Her personal best throw is 72.51 metres, achieved at the 2005 Universiade in İzmir, Turkey.

== Achievements ==
Year	Competition	Venue	Position	Notes
Representing China
2001	Universiade	Beijing, China	9th	63.26 m
2001	East Asian Games	Osaka, Japan	2nd	63.12 m
2002	Asian Games	Busan, South Korea	2nd	66.73 m
2003	Universiade	Daegu, South Korea	1st	69.05 m
2003	Asian Championships	Manila, Philippines	2nd	66.66 m
2003	Afro-Asian Games	Hyderabad, India	1st	68.03 m
2004	Olympic Games	Athens, Greece	14th (q)	68.12 m
2005	Universiade	İzmir, Turkey	2nd	72.51 m
2005	East Asian Games	Macau	2nd	69.20 m
2007	World Championships	Osaka, Japan	31st (q)	62.83 m
