= Krishna Poonia =

Indian politician and former discus thrower (born 1977)

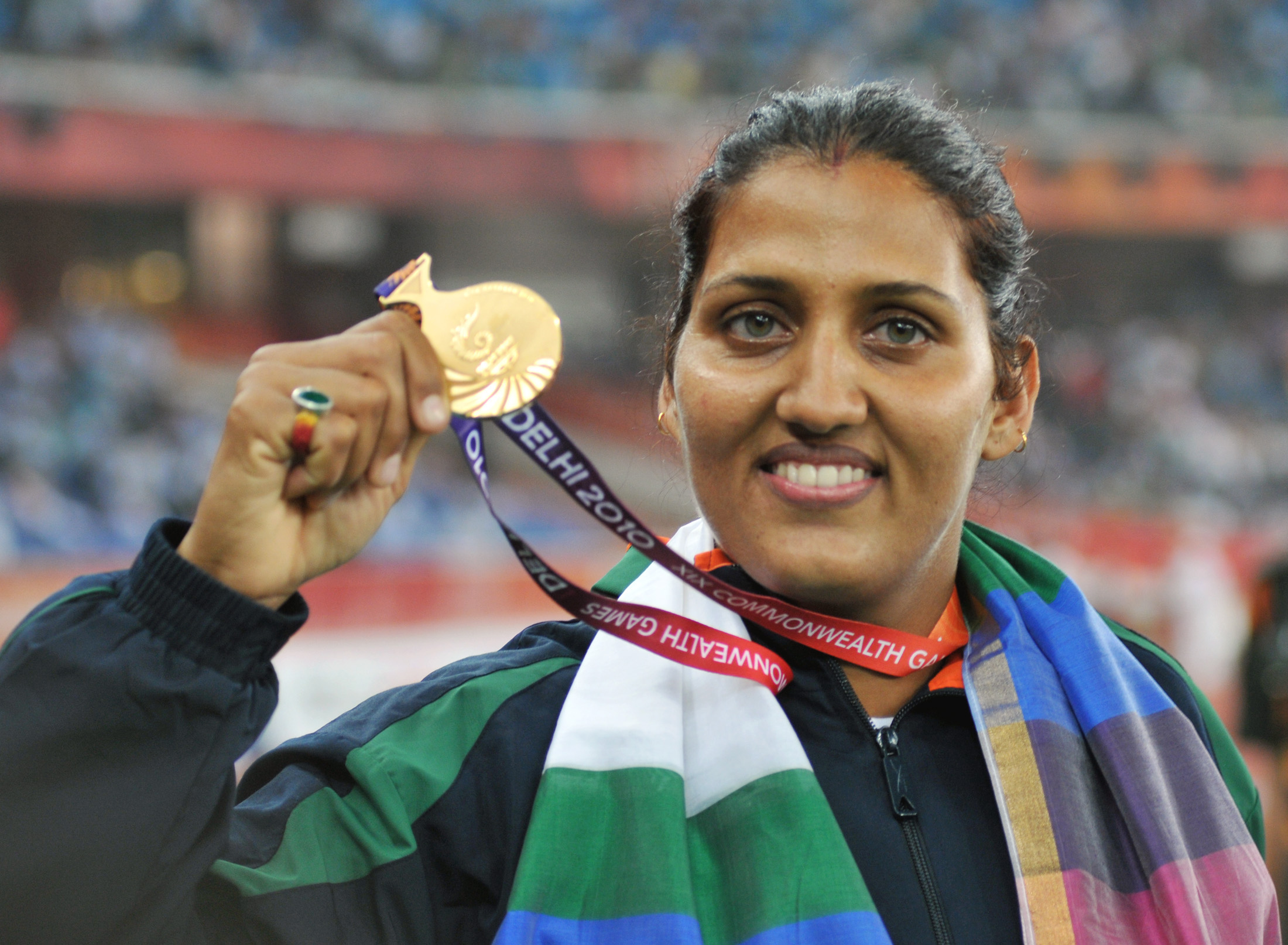
- Poonia at the 2010 Commonwealth Games

Personal information
- Born: 5 May 1977 (age 49) Agroha, Haryana, India
- Height: 1.8 m (5 ft 11 in)

Sport
- Sport: Athletics
- Event: Discus throw

Achievements and titles
- Personal best: 64.76 m (2012)
Medal record
Women's athletics
Representing India
Commonwealth Games
| Gold medal – first place | 2010 Delhi | Discus throw |
Asian Games
| Bronze medal – third place | 2006 Doha | Discus throw |
| Bronze medal – third place | 2010 Guangzhou | Discus throw |
Asian Championships
| Bronze medal – third place | 2005 Incheon | Discus throw |
| Bronze medal – third place | 2007 Amman | Discus throw |
| Bronze medal – third place | 2009 Guangzhou | Discus throw |

Krishna Poonia (born 5 May 1977) is an Indian politician and former discus thrower. A former Commonwealth Games Champion, she represented India in the women's discus throw event at the 2008 and 2012 Olympic Games. In recognition of her contributions to Indian athletics, she received the Arjuna Award in 2010 and the Padma Shri in 2011. Poonia later entered politics and served as a Member of the Legislative Assembly from the Sadulpur constituency, representing the Indian National Congress in 2018.

== Early and personal life ==
Krishna was born on 5 May 1977 in Hindu Jat family of Agroha in Haryana. Her ancestral place was Bidhwan village of Siwani block of Bhiwani district, her family migrated to Agroha where she was born. She was raised by her father and paternal grandmother after her mother died when she was nine years old. Her physical fitness was honed as a result of working at her family land since the age of 15 and not exactly undergoing rigorous sports training. Krishna obtained a Bachelor of Arts degree in sociology from Fateh Chand College for Women, Hisar.

In 2000, she married Virender Singh Poonia, a former athlete who coached her after their marriage, and had a son in 2001. The couple worked for Indian Railways but in 2013, Poonia resigned and joined the Indian National Congress.

== Career ==
=== 2010 Commonwealth Games ===
Poonia became the first Indian woman athlete to win a gold medal at the 2010 Commonwealth Games in Delhi. Poonia led the historic clean sweep of the discus event by clearing 61.51 m. She is the first Indian woman to win a gold medal in track and field events of Commonwealth Games and the first Indian to win a gold medal in such events after Milkha Singh who had won the gold in men's 440 yards race in the 1958 Cardiff Commonwealth Games.

=== 2012 London Olympics ===
She finished a creditable sixth in the women's discus throw in the 2012 London Olympics. Poonia's best effort of 63.62 m came in her fifth and penultimate attempt. She had 62.42 m in the first attempt and 61.61 in the third and 61.31 m in the sixth and the final throw. She had two no-throws in the second and the fourth attempt. Earlier she became only the sixth Indian to make it to the final round of an Olympic track and field event after Milkha Singh, P T Usha, Sriram Singh, Gurbachan Singh Randhawa and Anju Bobby George.

== Political career ==
In 2013, she joined the Indian National Congress at an election rally in Churu – her husband's home district – in the presence of Rahul Gandhi and then chief minister Ashok Gehlot after she was approached by the Congress's leadership.

In 2013 Rajasthan Legislative Assembly election, she contested and lost her first election from the Sadulpur Assembly constituency as Congress candidate where she finished third behind BJP and BSP.

In 2018 Rajasthan Legislative Assembly election, she contested again and won the same seat on a Congress ticket, by a margin of 18,084 votes.

In 2019 Lok Sabha Elections, Poonia was nominated by Congress from the Jaipur Rural constituency. She contested against Olympian Rajyavardhan Singh Rathore of the BJP. She lost to Rathore by a margin of 3,93,171 votes.

Poonia has been helping Rajasthan State Health Ministry in its attempt to curb female foeticide as the selective abortion of female fetuses is a pressing concern in India especially in Haryana where Poonia grew up. She is also engaged in improving the infrastructure of sports for children in Jaipur and across the country.

She was appointed as the president of Rajasthan State Sports Council in 2022.

In 2023 Rajasthan Legislative Assembly election, she lost the election from the Sadulpur Assembly constituency as Congress candidate by a margin of 2,574 votes behind BSP.

== Honours ==
- Padma Shri, fourth highest civilian award of India (2011)
- Arjuna Award, second highest sporting honour of India (2010)
