= Hitomi Katsuyama =

Japanese hammer thrower

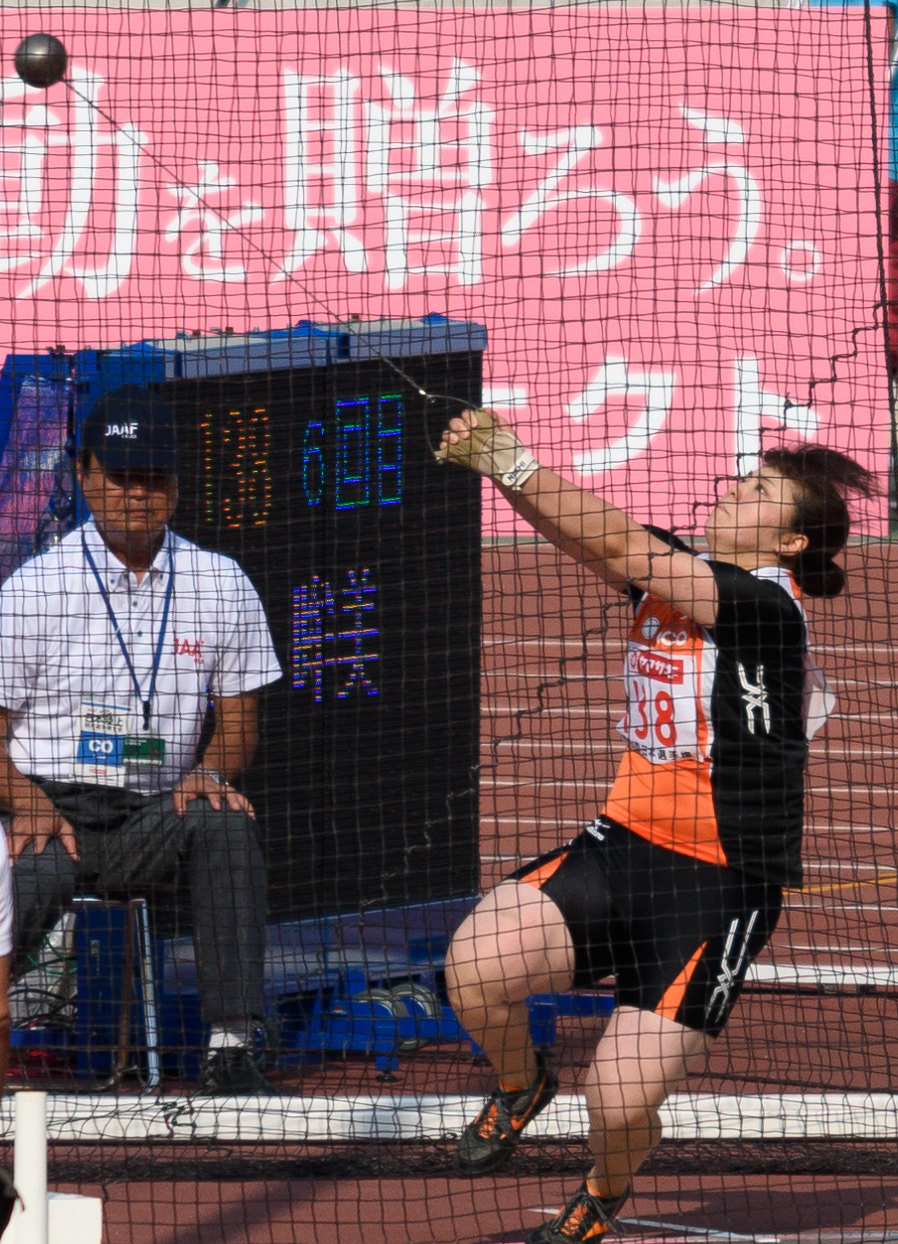

Personal information
- Born: May 21, 1994 (age 32)
- Education: Physical education at University of Tsukuba
- Height: 161 cm (5 ft 3 in)
- Weight: 75 kg (165 lb)

Sport
- Sport: Athletics
- Event: Hammer throw

Achievements and titles
- Personal best: 65.32 m (2018)
Medal record
Representing Japan
Asian Games
Bronze medal – third place	2018 Jakarta	Hammer throw
Asian Athletics Championships
Bronze medal – third place	2017 Bhubaneswar	Hammer throw

Hitomi Katsuyama (勝山眸美, Katsuyama Hitomi; born May 21, 1994) is a Japanese hammer thrower.

== Career ==
In 2017, she won bronze in 2017 Asian Athletics Championships, and gold in 101st Japan Championships in Athletics. In 2018, she won gold in 102nd Japan Championships in Athletics, and bronze in 2018 Asian Games.
