= Yuka Murofushi =

Japanese athletics competitor

Yuka Murofushi OLY
Personal information
- Born: February 11, 1977 (age 49)

Sport
- Sport: Hammer throw, discus throw
Medal record
Women's athletics
Representing Japan
Asian Championships
Silver medal – second place	2000 Jakarta	Hammer throw
Bronze medal – third place	2005 Incheon	Hammer throw

Yuka Murofushi (室伏 由佳, Murofushi Yuka; born 11 February 1977) is a retired Japanese discus and hammer thrower.

Murofushi comes from a hammer throwing family, as her father Shigenobu Murofushi is a former Olympian and held the Japanese record for decades, and her brother Koji Murofushi, is the 2004 Olympic champion in the event. Her mother, Serafina Moritz, is Romanian, and former European junior javelin champion and senior champion for Romania. Her parents are now divorced.

She won the 2010 Japanese title in both the discus and hammer throw events.

== International competitions ==
Representing Japan
Year	Competition	Venue	Position	Event	Notes
1996	World Junior Championships	Sydney, Australia	6th	Discus throw	51.56 m
1997	East Asian Games	Busan, South Korea	3rd	Discus throw	51.90 m
2000	Asian Championships	Jakarta, Indonesia	5th	Discus throw	53.14 m
2000	Asian Championships	Jakarta, Indonesia	2nd	Hammer throw	58.64 m
2001	East Asian Games	Osaka, Japan	3rd	Discus throw	50.87 m
2003	Asian Championships	Manila, Philippines	5th	Discus throw	54.08 m
2004	Olympic Games	Athens, Greece	27th	Hammer throw	65.33 m
2005	Asian Championships	Incheon, South Korea	4th	Discus throw	56.23 m
2005	Asian Championships	Incheon, South Korea	3rd	Hammer throw	62.62 m
2005	World Championships	Helsinki, Finland	27th (q)	Hammer throw	62.83 m
2005	East Asian Games	Macau	3rd	Discus throw	54.28 m
2005	East Asian Games	Macau	3rd	Hammer throw	63.67 m
2006	Asian Games	Doha, Qatar	4th	Discus throw	52.26 m
2006	Asian Games	Doha, Qatar	4th	Hammer throw	59.74 m
2007	World Championships	Osaka, Japan	27th (q)	Discus throw	52.76 m
2009	Asian Championships	Guangzhou, China	4th	Discus throw	55.14 m
2009	Asian Championships	Guangzhou, China	3rd	Hammer throw	61.99 m
2010	Asian Games	Guangzhou, China	6th	Discus throw	50.28 m
2010	Asian Games	Guangzhou, China	3rd	Hammer throw	62.94 m
2011	Asian Championships	Kobe, Japan	8th	Discus throw	49.24 m
2011	Asian Championships	Kobe, Japan	3rd	Hammer throw	62.50 m

=== Personal bests ===
- Hammer throw – 67.77 m (2004 in Fujiyoshida) – national record.
- Discus throw – 58.62 m (2007 in Gifu) – national record.
