= Zhang Wenxiu =

Chinese hammer thrower

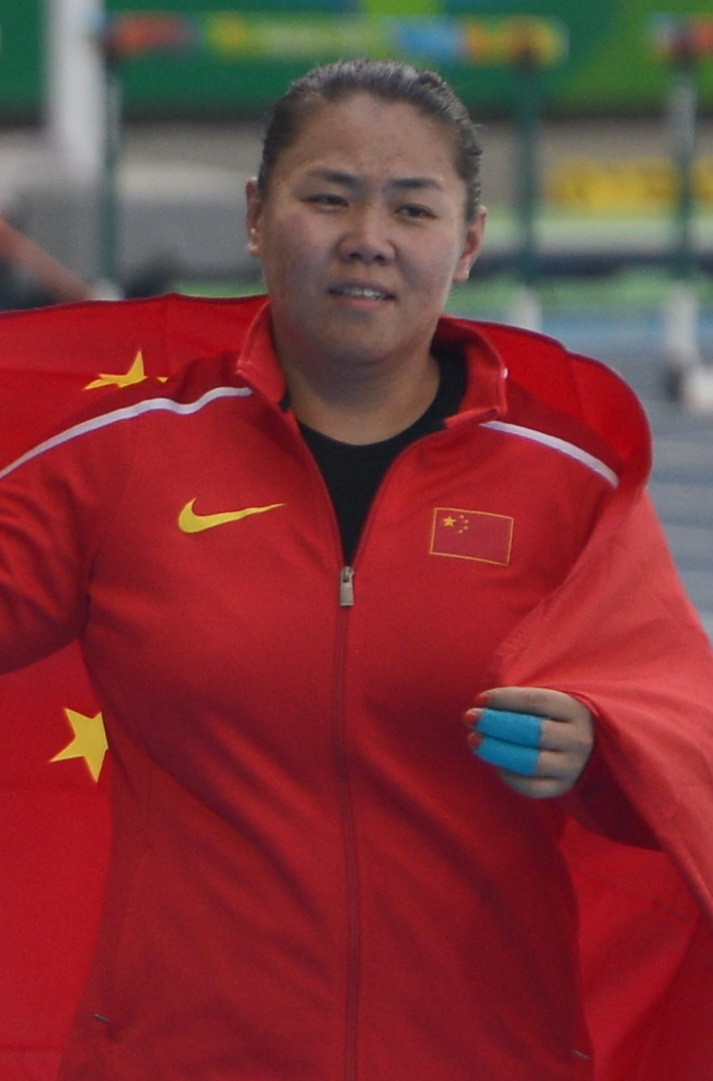
- Zhang Wenxiu after winning silver medal at Rio 2016

Personal information
- Nationality: Chinese
- Born: 22 March 1986 (age 40) Liaoning, China
- Height: 1.82 m (5 ft 11 1/2 in)
- Weight: 113 kg (249 lb)

Sport
- Country: China
- Sport: Athletics
- Event: Hammer throw

Achievements and titles
- Personal best: 77.33 m (2014)
Medal record
Women's athletics
Representing China
Olympic Games
| Silver medal – second place | 2008 Beijing | Hammer throw |
| Silver medal – second place | 2016 Rio de Janeiro | Hammer throw |
| Bronze medal – third place | 2012 London | Hammer throw |
World Championships
| Silver medal – second place | 2013 Moscow | Hammer throw |
| Silver medal – second place | 2015 Beijing | Hammer throw |
| Bronze medal – third place | 2007 Osaka | Hammer throw |
| Bronze medal – third place | 2011 Daegu | Hammer throw |
Asian Games
| Gold medal – first place | 2006 Doha | Hammer throw |
| Gold medal – first place | 2010 Guangzhou | Hammer throw |
| Gold medal – first place | 2014 Incheon | Hammer throw |
Asian Championships
| Gold medal – first place | 2005 Incheon | Hammer throw |
| Gold medal – first place | 2009 Guangzhou | Hammer throw |

Zhang Wenxiu (Chinese: 张文秀; pinyin: Zhāng Wénxiù, born 22 March 1986 in Dalian, Liaoning) is a retired Chinese female hammer thrower.

== Career ==
She won the 2005 Asian Championships and 2006 Asian Games. She finished tenth at the 2001 World Championships, seventh at the 2004 Olympics, fifth at the 2005 World Championships and fourth at the 2006 World Cup. She then won bronze medals at the 2007 World Championships and the 2008 Olympic Games.

She also holds the world junior record with 73.24 metres, achieved in June 2005 in Changsha.

At 2014 Asian Games in Incheon, she originally won the gold medal but was stripped of it after testing positive for the prohibited substance zeranol. Zhang was reinstated after successfully appealing the decision to the Court of Arbitration for Sport (CAS), which accepted her explanation that the zeranol came from contaminated food.

== Achievements ==
| Year | Competition | Venue | Position | Notes |
Representing China
| 2001 | World Championships | Edmonton, Canada | 11th | 61.61 m |
| 2002 | World Junior Championships | Kingston, Jamaica | 20th (q) | 52.31 m |
| 2003 | World Championships | Paris, France | 14th (q) | 65.09 m |
| 2004 | Olympic Games | Athens, Greece | 7th | 72.03 m |
| 2005 | Asian Championships | Incheon, South Korea | 1st | 70.05 m |
| 2005 | East Asian Games | Macau | 1st | 72.23 m |
| 2005 | World Championships | Helsinki, Finland | 4th | 69.82 m |
| 2006 | World Cup | Athens, Greece | 4th | 71.19 m |
| 2006 | Asian Games | Doha, Qatar | 1st | 74.15 m |
| 2007 | World Championships | Osaka, Japan | 3rd | 74.39 m |
| 2008 | Olympic Games | Beijing, China | 2nd | 74.32 m |
| 2009 | World Championships | Berlin, Germany | 5th | 72.57 m |
| 2009 | Asian Championships | Guangzhou, China | 1st | 72.07 m |
| 2010 | Continental Cup | Split, Croatia | 2nd | 73.69 m |
| 2010 | Asian Games | Guangzhou, China | 1st | 72.84 m |
| 2011 | World Championships | Daegu, South Korea | 3rd | 75.03 m |
| 2012 | Olympic Games | London, United Kingdom | 3rd | 76.34 m |
| 2013 | World Championships | Moscow, Russia | 2nd | 75.58 m |
| 2014 | Asian Games | Incheon, South Korea | 1st | 77.33 m |
| 2015 | World Championships | Beijing, China | 2nd | 76.33 m |
| 2016 | Olympic Games | Rio de Janeiro, Brazil | 2nd | 76.75 m |
| 2017 | World Championships | London, United Kingdom | 4th | 74.53 m |

== See also ==
- China at the World Championships in Athletics
