= Tennis at the 2014 Asian Games – Men's team =

Men's team at the 2014 Asian Games
- Venue: Yeorumul Tennis Courts
- Dates: 20–24 September 2014
- Competitors: 71 from 21 nations

Medalists
gold medal	Kazakhstan; Andrey Golubev, Mikhail Kukushkin, Aleksandr Nedovyesov
silver medal	China; Gong Maoxin, Li Zhe, Wu Di, Zhang Ze
bronze medal	Uzbekistan; Farrukh Dustov, Sanjar Fayziev, Temur Ismailov, Denis Istomin
bronze medal	Japan; Tatsuma Ito, Yoshihito Nishioka, Yuichi Sugita, Yasutaka Uchiyama

Men's team
- Tennis at the 2014 Asian Games

Events
Singles	men	women
Doubles	men	women	mixed
Team	men	women
- Asian Games

The men's team tennis event at the 2014 Asian Games took place at the Yeorumul Tennis Courts, Incheon, South Korea from 20 September to 24 September 2014. A total of 19 nations participated in the event. Chinese Taipei were defending champions, but lost in quarterfinals to China.

== Schedule ==
All times are Korea Standard Time (UTC+09:00)

Date	Time	Event
Saturday, 20 September 2014	10:30	1st round
Sunday, 21 September 2014	10:30	2nd round
Monday, 22 September 2014	10:30	Quarterfinals
Tuesday, 23 September 2014	10:30	Semifinals
Wednesday, 24 September 2014	17:00	Final

== Results ==
=== Bracket ===
==== Final ====
Final
1	Kazakhstan	2
5	China	0

==== Top half ====
1st round
Hong Kong	2
Kuwait	1
Saudi Arabia	3
Oman	0
Turkmenistan	3
Cambodia	0

2nd round
1	Kazakhstan	3
Hong Kong	0
Nepal	0
6	India	3
3	Uzbekistan	3
Saudi Arabia	0
Turkmenistan	0
7	South Korea	3

Quarterfinals
1	Kazakhstan	2
6	India	1
3	Uzbekistan	2
7	South Korea	1

Semifinals
1	Kazakhstan	2
3	Uzbekistan	1

==== Bottom half ====
1st round
Pakistan	3
Qatar	0
Philippines	3
Mongolia	0

2nd round
8	Thailand	3
Indonesia	0
Kyrgyzstan	0
4	Japan	3
5	China	3
Pakistan	0
Philippines	1
2	Chinese Taipei	2

Quarterfinals
8	Thailand	1
4	Japan	2
5	China	2
2	Chinese Taipei	1

Semifinals
4	Japan	1
5	China	2

=== 1st round ===
20 September	Hong Kong	2–1	Kuwait

Yeung Pak Long	2–0	Abdulhameed Al-Shatti	6–3, 6–2
David Sofaer	0–2	Mohammad Ghareeb	3–6, 2–6
Wong Chun Hun / Yeung Pak Long	2–0	Abdulhameed Al-Shatti / Mohammad Ghareeb	7–5, 7–6^{(7–4)}

20 September	Saudi Arabia	3–0	Oman

Omar Fahmi	2–0	Omran Al-Balushi	6–2, 6–1
Ammar Al-Haqbani	2–0	Younis Al-Rawahi	6–1, 6–0
Musaed Al-Azzam / Faisal Al-Rebdi	2–0	Omran Al-Balushi / Younis Al-Rawahi	7–5, 7–5

20 September	Turkmenistan	3–0	Cambodia

Isa Mämmetgulyýew	2–0	Long Samneang	6–1, 6–0
Aleksandr Ernepesow	2–1	Mam Phalkun	6–4, 3–6, 7–5
Isa Mämmetgulyýew / Georgiý Poçaý	2–0	Long Samneang / Mam Phalkun	6–0, 6–1

20 September	Pakistan	3–0	Qatar

Muhammad Abid	2–1	Jabor Al-Mutawa	6–2, 6–7^{(4–7)}, 6–3
Aqeel Khan	2–1	Mousa Al-Harrasi	6–0, 4–6, 6–1
Muhammad Abid / Aqeel Khan	2–0	Ali Al-Saygh / Mubarak Al-Harrasi	6–1, 6–4

20 September	Philippines	3–0	Mongolia

Ruben Gonzales	2–0	Mönkhbaataryn Badrakh	6–3, 6–2
Patrick John Tierro	2–0	Düürenbayaryn Erdenebayar	6–4, 6–2
Ruben Gonzales / Treat Huey	2–0	Baataryn Oyuunbat / Sükhbaataryn Sükhjargal	6–0, 6–0

=== 2nd round ===
21 September	Kazakhstan	3–0	Hong Kong

Aleksandr Nedovyesov	2–0	Yeung Pak Long	6–1, 6–3
Mikhail Kukushkin	2–0	David Sofaer	6–1, 6–1
Mikhail Kukushkin / Aleksandr Nedovyesov	2–0	Kevin Kung / Wong Chun Hun	6–3, 6–1

21 September	Nepal	0–3	India

Abhishek Bastola	0–2	Sanam Singh	0–6, 1–6
Jitendra Pariyar	0–2	Yuki Bhambri	0–6, 0–6
Santosh Khatri / Dawa Sonam Sherpa	0–2	Saketh Myneni / Divij Sharan	0–6, 0–6

21 September	Uzbekistan	3–0	Saudi Arabia

Temur Ismailov	2–0	Omar Fahmi	6–1, 6–3
Farrukh Dustov	2–0	Ammar Al-Haqbani	6–2, 6–1
Sanjar Fayziev / Temur Ismailov	2–0	Musaed Al-Azzam / Faisal Al-Rebdi	6–1, 6–1

21 September	Turkmenistan	0–3	South Korea

Isa Mämmetgulyýew	0–2	Lim Yong-kyu	1–6, 1–6
Aleksandr Ernepesow	0–2	Chung Hyeon	0–6, 1–6
Isa Mämmetgulyýew / Georgiý Poçaý	0–2	Chung Hyeon / Lim Yong-kyu	0–6, 1–6

21 September	Thailand	3–0	Indonesia

Pruchya Isaro	2–0	Aditya Hari Sasongko	6–3, 6–2
Danai Udomchoke	2–0	Christopher Rungkat	6–3, 7–5
Sanchai Ratiwatana / Sonchat Ratiwatana	2–0	David Agung Susanto / Elbert Sie	6–4, 6–4

21 September	Kyrgyzstan	0–3	Japan

Georgii Kotliarevskii	0–2	Yoshihito Nishioka	0–6, 0–6
Daniiar Duldaev	0–2	Yuichi Sugita	0–6, 4–6
Daniiar Duldaev / Georgii Kotliarevskii	0–2	Yoshihito Nishioka / Yasutaka Uchiyama	0–6, 1–6

21 September	China	3–0	Pakistan

Wu Di	2–0	Muhammad Abid	6–1, 6–2
Zhang Ze	2–0	Aqeel Khan	6–1, 6–0
Gong Maoxin / Li Zhe	2–0	Muhammad Abid / Aqeel Khan	6–3, 6–4

21 September	Philippines	1–2	Chinese Taipei

Treat Huey	1–2	Jimmy Wang	6–4, 3–6, 0–6
Patrick John Tierro	0–2	Lu Yen-hsun	0–6, 0–6
Ruben Gonzales / Treat Huey	2–1	Chen Ti / Peng Hsien-yin	4–6, 7–6^{(10–8)}, 7–6^{(7–4)}

=== Quarterfinals ===
22 September	Kazakhstan	2–1	India

Aleksandr Nedovyesov	2–0	Sanam Singh	7–6^{(7–5)}, 7–6^{(7–3)}
Mikhail Kukushkin	2–1	Yuki Bhambri	6–2, 6–7^{(6–8)}, 6–1
Andrey Golubev / Aleksandr Nedovyesov	0–2	Saketh Myneni / Divij Sharan	5–7, 5–7

22 September	Uzbekistan	2–1	South Korea

Farrukh Dustov	2–0	Lim Yong-kyu	7–6^{(10–8)}, 6–3
Denis Istomin	2–0	Chung Hyeon	6–4, 7–5
Temur Ismailov / Sanjar Fayziev	0–2	Cho Min-hyeok / Nam Ji-sung	3–6, 1–6

22 September	Thailand	1–2	Japan

Pruchya Isaro	1–2	Yoshihito Nishioka	4–6, 6–4, 3–6
Danai Udomchoke	1–2	Yuichi Sugita	7–5, 5–7, 6–7^{(6–8)}
Sanchai Ratiwatana / Sonchat Ratiwatana	2–0	Yoshihito Nishioka / Yasutaka Uchiyama	3–2, Retired

22 September	China	2–1	Chinese Taipei

Wu Di	2–0	Jimmy Wang	6–2, 6–4
Zhang Ze	0–2	Lu Yen-hsun	6–7^{(4–7)}, 4–6
Gong Maoxin / Li Zhe	2–1	Chen Ti / Peng Hsien-yin	2–6, 6–3, 6–0

=== Semifinals ===
23 September	Kazakhstan	2–1	Uzbekistan

Aleksandr Nedovyesov	2–0	Farrukh Dustov	6–3, 6–4
Mikhail Kukushkin	1–2	Denis Istomin	6–4, 3–6, 4–6
Andrey Golubev / Aleksandr Nedovyesov	2–1	Farrukh Dustov / Denis Istomin	6–7^{(4–7)}, 7–5, 6–4

23 September	Japan	1–2	China

Yoshihito Nishioka	2–1	Wu Di	4–6, 6–4, 6–4
Yuichi Sugita	1–2	Zhang Ze	4–6, 7–5, 1–6
Tatsuma Ito / Yasutaka Uchiyama	1–2	Gong Maoxin / Li Zhe	6–2, 6–7^{(5–7)}, 2–6

=== Final ===
24 September	Kazakhstan	2–0	China

Aleksandr Nedovyesov	2–0	Wu Di	6–4, 6–0
Mikhail Kukushkin	2–1	Zhang Ze	6–0, 3–6, 6–4
