= Tennis at the 2014 Asian Games – Mixed doubles =

Mixed doubles at the 2014 Asian Games
- Venue: Yeorumul Tennis Courts
- Dates: 25–29 September 2014
- Competitors: 54 from 15 nations

Medalists
gold medal	Saketh Myneni; Sania Mirza	India
silver medal	Peng Hsien-yin; Chan Hao-ching	Chinese Taipei
bronze medal	Yuichi Sugita; Shuko Aoyama	Japan
bronze medal	Zhang Ze; Zheng Jie	China

Mixed doubles
- Tennis at the 2014 Asian Games

Events
Singles	men	women
Doubles	men	women	mixed
Team	men	women
Asian Games

The mixed doubles tennis event at the 2014 Asian Games took place at the Yeorumul Tennis Courts, Incheon, South Korea from 25 September to 29 September 2014.

== Schedule ==
All times are Korea Standard Time (UTC+09:00)

Date	Time	Event
Thursday, 25 September 2014	13:00	1st round
Friday, 26 September 2014	14:30	2nd round
Saturday, 27 September 2014	16:30	Quarterfinals
Sunday, 28 September 2014	20:20	Semifinals
Monday, 29 September 2014	21:00	Final

== Results ==
=== Final ===
Final
1	Peng Hsien-yin (TPE); Chan Hao-ching (TPE)	4	3
2	Saketh Myneni (IND); Sania Mirza (IND)	6	6

=== Top half ===
1st round
Yeung Pak Long (HKG); Eudice Chong (HKG)	6	6
Temur Ismailov (UZB); Arina Folts (UZB)	3	1
Ghassan Al-Ansi (YEM); Shaema Al-Olfi (YEM)	1	0
Lim Yong-kyu (KOR); Yoo Mi (KOR)	6	6
Isa Mämmetgulyýew (TKM); Anastasiýa Prenko (TKM)	4	1
8	Divij Sharan (IND); Ankita Raina (IND)	6	6
Dawa Sonam Sherpa (NEP); Anne Mathema (NEP)	0	1
Ruben Gonzales (PHI); Katharina Lehnert (PHI)	6	6
Daniiar Duldaev (KGZ); Ksenia Palkina (KGZ)	0	2
Wu Di (CHN); Zheng Saisai (CHN)	6	6
Sükhbaataryn Sükhjargal (MGL); Enkhbayaryn Bolor (MGL)	0	1
6	Yuichi Sugita (JPN); Shuko Aoyama (JPN)	6	6

2nd round
1	Peng Hsien-yin (TPE); Chan Hao-ching (TPE)	6	6
Yeung Pak Long (HKG); Eudice Chong (HKG)	2	1
Lim Yong-kyu (KOR); Yoo Mi (KOR)	6	6
8	Divij Sharan (IND); Ankita Raina (IND)	4	2
3	Sanchai Ratiwatana (THA); Peangtarn Plipuech (THA)	6	4	[11]
Ruben Gonzales (PHI); Katharina Lehnert (PHI)	3	6	[9]
Wu Di (CHN); Zheng Saisai (CHN)	6	6^{2}	[7]
6	Yuichi Sugita (JPN); Shuko Aoyama (JPN)	4	7^{7}	[10]

Quarterfinals
1	Peng Hsien-yin (TPE); Chan Hao-ching (TPE)	4	7^{8}	[10]
Lim Yong-kyu (KOR); Yoo Mi (KOR)	6	6^{6}	[3]
3	Sanchai Ratiwatana (THA); Peangtarn Plipuech (THA)	6	3	[10]
6	Yuichi Sugita (JPN); Shuko Aoyama (JPN)	4	6	[12]

Semifinals
1	Peng Hsien-yin (TPE); Chan Hao-ching (TPE)	6	7
6	Yuichi Sugita (JPN); Shuko Aoyama (JPN)	1	5

=== Bottom half ===
1st round
Treat Huey (PHI); Denise Dy (PHI)	6	6
Wong Chun Hun (HKG); Katherine Ip (HKG)	2	4
Mam Phalkun (CAM); Andrea Ka (CAM)	6	6
Sakshyam Karki (NEP); Ira Mehernissa Rawat (NEP)	0	1
7	Lu Yen-hsun (TPE); Hsieh Su-wei (TPE)	6	6
Mönkhbaataryn Badrakh (MGL); Altansarnaigiin Jargal (MGL)	0	1
Yoshihito Nishioka (JPN); Misa Eguchi (JPN)	2	6^{2}
Kim Cheong-eui (KOR); Han Na-lae (KOR)	6	7^{7}
Sanjar Fayziev (UZB); Sabina Sharipova (UZB)	7	6
Georgii Kotliarevskii (KGZ); Arina Beliaeva (KGZ)	5	4

2nd round
5	Danai Udomchoke (THA); Tamarine Tanasugarn (THA)	6	6
Treat Huey (PHI); Denise Dy (PHI)	3	4
Mam Phalkun (CAM); Andrea Ka (CAM)	1	2
4	Zhang Ze (CHN); Zheng Jie (CHN)	6	6
7	Lu Yen-hsun (TPE); Hsieh Su-wei (TPE)	2	6	[6]
Kim Cheong-eui (KOR); Han Na-lae (KOR)	6	4	[10]
Sanjar Fayziev (UZB); Sabina Sharipova (UZB)	3	4
2	Saketh Myneni (IND); Sania Mirza (IND)	6	6

Quarterfinals
5	Danai Udomchoke (THA); Tamarine Tanasugarn (THA)	6	2	[11]
4	Zhang Ze (CHN); Zheng Jie (CHN)	4	6	[13]
Kim Cheong-eui (KOR); Han Na-lae (KOR)	3	6^{4}
2	Saketh Myneni (IND); Sania Mirza (IND)	6	7^{7}

Semifinals
4	Zhang Ze (CHN); Zheng Jie (CHN)	1	3
2	Saketh Myneni (IND); Sania Mirza (IND)	6	6
