= Tennis at the 2014 Asian Games – Men's doubles =

Men's doubles at the 2014 Asian Games
- Venue: Yeorumul Tennis Courts
- Dates: 24–29 September 2014
- Competitors: 56 from 18 nations

Medalists
gold medal	Chung Hyeon; Lim Yong-kyu	South Korea
silver medal	Saketh Myneni; Sanam Singh	India
bronze medal	Sanchai Ratiwatana; Sonchat Ratiwatana	Thailand
bronze medal	Yuki Bhambri; Divij Sharan	India

Men's doubles
- Tennis at the 2014 Asian Games

Events
Singles	men	women
Doubles	men	women	mixed
Team	men	women
- Asian Games

The men's doubles tennis event at the 2014 Asian Games took place at the Yeorumul Tennis Courts, Incheon, South Korea from 24 September to 29 September 2014.

== Schedule ==
All times are Korea Standard Time (UTC+09:00)

Date	Time	Event
Wednesday, 24 September 2014	12:00	1st round
Thursday, 25 September 2014	13:00	1st round
Friday, 26 September 2014	13:00	2nd round
Saturday, 27 September 2014	11:00	Quarterfinals
Sunday, 28 September 2014	13:30	Semifinals
Monday, 29 September 2014	15:15	Final

== Results ==
Legend

- WO — Won by walkover

=== Final ===
Final
5	Saketh Myneni (IND); Sanam Singh (IND)	5	6^{2}
8	Chung Hyeon (KOR); Lim Yong-kyu (KOR)	7	7^{7}

=== Top half ===
1st round
Mousa Al-Harrasi (QAT); Jabor Al-Mutawa (QAT)	6	6
Düürenbayaryn Erdenebayar (MGL); Sükhbaataryn Sükhjargal (MGL)	4	4
Samrakshyak Bhushan Bajracharya (NEP); Sakshyam Karki (NEP)	1	2
Aleksandr Ernepesow (TKM); Georgiý Poçaý (TKM)	6	6
Muhammad Abid (PAK); Aqeel Khan (PAK)	3	1
6	Gong Maoxin (CHN); Li Zhe (CHN)	6	6
Li Hei Yin (HKG); David Sofaer (HKG)	2	5
Christopher Rungkat (INA); Elbert Sie (INA)	6	7
Musaed Al-Azzam (KSA); Faisal Al-Rebdi (KSA)	5	7^{7}	[10]
Omran Al-Balushi (OMA); Younis Al-Rawahi (OMA)	7	6^{1}	[8]
Cho Min-hyeok (KOR); Nam Ji-sung (KOR)	3	4
5	Saketh Myneni (IND); Sanam Singh (IND)	6	6

2nd round
1	Sanchai Ratiwatana (THA); Sonchat Ratiwatana (THA)	6	6
Mousa Al-Harrasi (QAT); Jabor Al-Mutawa (QAT)	0	0
Aleksandr Ernepesow (TKM); Georgiý Poçaý (TKM)	2	0
6	Gong Maoxin (CHN); Li Zhe (CHN)	6	6
3	Chen Ti (TPE); Peng Hsien-yin (TPE)	6	6
Christopher Rungkat (INA); Elbert Sie (INA)	4	4
Musaed Al-Azzam (KSA); Faisal Al-Rebdi (KSA)	0	1
5	Saketh Myneni (IND); Sanam Singh (IND)	6	6

Quarterfinals
1	Sanchai Ratiwatana (THA); Sonchat Ratiwatana (THA)	7^{7}	7
6	Gong Maoxin (CHN); Li Zhe (CHN)	6^{4}	5
3	Chen Ti (TPE); Peng Hsien-yin (TPE)	2	6^{10}
5	Saketh Myneni (IND); Sanam Singh (IND)	6	7^{12}

Semifinals
1	Sanchai Ratiwatana (THA); Sonchat Ratiwatana (THA)	6	3	[6]
5	Saketh Myneni (IND); Sanam Singh (IND)	4	6	[10]

=== Bottom half ===
1st round
7	Pruchya Isaro (THA); Nuttanon Kadchapanan (THA)	W	O
Daniiar Duldaev (KGZ); Georgii Kotliarevskii (KGZ)
Lee Hsin-han (TPE); Jimmy Wang (TPE)	6	6
Bai Yan (CHN); Wang Chuhan (CHN)	4	2
Wong Chun Hun (HKG); Yeung Pak Long (HKG)	6	6
Ali Al-Saygh (QAT); Mubarak Al-Harrasi (QAT)	0	1
8	Chung Hyeon (KOR); Lim Yong-kyu (KOR)	6	6
Omar Abdo (KSA); Hamad Al-Suroor (KSA)	0	0
Aditya Hari Sasongko (INA); David Agung Susanto (INA)	6	6
Abdulhameed Al-Shatti (KUW); Mohammad Ghareeb (KUW)	2	2
Chan Chi Neng (MAC); Marco Leung (MAC)	6	6
Abhishek Bastola (NEP); Jitendra Pariyar (NEP)	2	4

2nd round
7	Pruchya Isaro (THA); Nuttanon Kadchapanan (THA)	2	1
Lee Hsin-han (TPE); Jimmy Wang (TPE)	6	6
Wong Chun Hun (HKG); Yeung Pak Long (HKG)	2	3
4	Yuki Bhambri (IND); Divij Sharan (IND)	6	6
8	Chung Hyeon (KOR); Lim Yong-kyu (KOR)	7	6
Aditya Hari Sasongko (INA); David Agung Susanto (INA)	5	1
Chan Chi Neng (MAC); Marco Leung (MAC)	0	3
2	Ruben Gonzales (PHI); Treat Huey (PHI)	6	6

Quarterfinals
Lee Hsin-han (TPE); Jimmy Wang (TPE)	5	6^{1}
4	Yuki Bhambri (IND); Divij Sharan (IND)	7	7^{7}
8	Chung Hyeon (KOR); Lim Yong-kyu (KOR)	6	6
2	Ruben Gonzales (PHI); Treat Huey (PHI)	0	3

Semifinals
4	Yuki Bhambri (IND); Divij Sharan (IND)	7^{10}	6^{6}	[9]
8	Chung Hyeon (KOR); Lim Yong-kyu (KOR)	6^{8}	7^{8}	[11]
