= Tennis at the 2014 Asian Games – Men's singles =

Men's singles at the 2014 Asian Games
- Venue: Yeorumul Tennis Courts
- Dates: 24–30 September 2014
- Competitors: 42 from 23 nations

Medalists
gold medal	Yoshihito Nishioka	Japan
silver medal	Lu Yen-hsun	Chinese Taipei
bronze medal	Yuichi Sugita	Japan
bronze medal	Yuki Bhambri	India

Men's singles
- Tennis at the 2014 Asian Games

Events
Singles	men	women
Doubles	men	women	mixed
Team	men	women
- Asian Games

The men's singles tennis event at the 2014 Asian Games took place at the Yeorumul Tennis Courts, Incheon, South Korea from 24 September to 30 September 2014. A total of 42 competitors from 23 nations participated in the event. Somdev Devvarman from India was the defending champion, but did not participate in this edition.

== Schedule ==
All times are Korea Standard Time (UTC+09:00)

Date	Time	Event
Wednesday, 24 September 2014	11:30	1st round
Thursday, 25 September 2014	10:30	2nd round
Friday, 26 September 2014	10:30	3rd round
Saturday, 27 September 2014	11:00	Quarterfinals
Sunday, 28 September 2014	12:00	Semifinals
Tuesday, 30 September 2014	15:25	Final

== Results ==
=== Finals ===
Semifinals					Final
1	Lu Yen-hsun (TPE)	6	3	7^{7}
3	Yuichi Sugita (JPN)	3	6	6^{5}	1	Lu Yen-hsun (TPE)	2	2
4	Yuki Bhambri (IND)	6	2	1	5	Yoshihito Nishioka (JPN)	6	6
5	Yoshihito Nishioka (JPN)	3	6	6

=== Top half ===
==== Section 1 ====
1st round
Ammar Al-Haqbani (KSA)	4	2
Aqeel Khan (PAK)	6	6
Santosh Khatri (NEP)	1	1
Abdulhameed Al-Shatti (KUW)	6	6
Marco Leung (MAC)	2	1
Patrick John Tierro (PHI)	6	6

2nd round
1	Lu Yen-hsun (TPE)	6	6
Aqeel Khan (PAK)	0	1
Isa Mämmetgulyýew (TKM)	2	3
14	Pruchya Isaro (THA)	6	6
10	Sanam Singh (IND)	6	6
Abdulhameed Al-Shatti (KUW)	1	2
Patrick John Tierro (PHI)	0	3
6	Chung Hyeon (KOR)	6	6

3rd round
1	Lu Yen-hsun (TPE)	6	6
14	Pruchya Isaro (THA)	0	3
10	Sanam Singh (IND)	7	6
6	Chung Hyeon (KOR)	5	1

Quarterfinals
1	Lu Yen-hsun (TPE)	7^{7}	6
10	Sanam Singh (IND)	6^{3}	4

==== Section 2 ====
1st round
Düürenbayaryn Erdenebayar (MGL)	0	2
Li Hei Yin (HKG)	6	6
David Agung Susanto (INA)	6	6
Mousa Al-Harrasi (QAT)	1	3

2nd round
3	Yuichi Sugita (JPN)	6	6
Li Hei Yin (HKG)	0	0
Long Samneang (CAM)	1	1
16	Daniiar Duldaev (KGZ)	6	6
11	Temur Ismailov (UZB)	6	6
Younis Al-Rawahi (OMA)	0	0
David Agung Susanto (INA)	0	3
8	Wu Di (CHN)	6	6

3rd round
3	Yuichi Sugita (JPN)	6	6^{4}	6
16	Daniiar Duldaev (KGZ)	0	7^{7}	1
11	Temur Ismailov (UZB)	6	6
8	Wu Di (CHN)	4	4

Quarterfinals
3	Yuichi Sugita (JPN)	6	6
11	Temur Ismailov (UZB)	3	3

=== Bottom half ===
==== Section 3 ====
1st round
Omar Fahmi (KSA)	1	3
Mam Phalkun (CAM)	6	6
Jabor Al-Mutawa (QAT)	6	6
Samrakshyak Bhushan Bajracharya (NEP)	0	1

2nd round
7	Zhang Ze (CHN)	6	6
Mam Phalkun (CAM)	0	1
Georgii Kotliarevskii (KGZ)	0	1
9	Danai Udomchoke (THA)	6	6
13	Christopher Rungkat (INA)	6	6
David Sofaer (HKG)	2	3
Jabor Al-Mutawa (QAT)	1	0
4	Yuki Bhambri (IND)	6	6

3rd round
7	Zhang Ze (CHN)	5	6	3
9	Danai Udomchoke (THA)	7	3	6
13	Christopher Rungkat (INA)	3	3
4	Yuki Bhambri (IND)	6	6

Quarterfinals
9	Danai Udomchoke (THA)	3	2
4	Yuki Bhambri (IND)	6	6

==== Section 4 ====
1st round
Tandin Wangchuk (BHU)	4	0
Aleksandr Ernepesow (TKM)	6	6
Mönkhbaataryn Badrakh (MGL)	6	6
Omran Al-Balushi (OMA)	0	1
Chan Chi Neng (MAC)	6	6^{5}	2
Ghassan Al-Ansi (YEM)	3	7^{7}	6

2nd round
5	Yoshihito Nishioka (JPN)	6	6
Aleksandr Ernepesow (TKM)	1	1
Mönkhbaataryn Badrakh (MGL)	1	2
12	Cho Min-hyeok (KOR)	6	6
15	Sanjar Fayziev (UZB)	6	6
Muhammad Abid (PAK)	2	0
Ghassan Al-Ansi (YEM)	2	1
2	Jimmy Wang (TPE)	6	6

3rd round
5	Yoshihito Nishioka (JPN)	6	6
12	Cho Min-hyeok (KOR)	3	2
15	Sanjar Fayziev (UZB)	1	1
2	Jimmy Wang (TPE)	6	6

Quarterfinals
5	Yoshihito Nishioka (JPN)	3	6	6
2	Jimmy Wang (TPE)	6	4	0
