= Tennis at the 2014 Asian Games – Women's singles =

Women's singles at the 2014 Asian Games
- Venue: Yeorumul Tennis Courts
- Dates: 24–30 September 2014
- Competitors: 33 from 18 nations

Medalists
gold medal	Wang Qiang	China
silver medal	Luksika Kumkhum	Thailand
bronze medal	Eri Hozumi	Japan
bronze medal	Misa Eguchi	Japan

Women's singles
- Tennis at the 2014 Asian Games

Events
Singles	men	women
Doubles	men	women	mixed
Team	men	women
- Asian Games

The women's singles tennis event at the 2014 Asian Games took place at the Yeorumul Tennis Courts, Incheon, South Korea from 24 September to 30 September 2014.

== Schedule ==
All times are Korea Standard Time (UTC+09:00)

Date	Time	Event
Wednesday, 24 September 2014	11:30	1st round
Wednesday, 24 September 2014	12:00	2nd round
Thursday, 25 September 2014	10:30	2nd round
Friday, 26 September 2014	10:30	3rd round
Saturday, 27 September 2014	11:00	Quarterfinals
Sunday, 28 September 2014	12:00	Semifinals
Tuesday, 30 September 2014	13:00	Final

== Results ==
=== Finals ===
Semifinals					Final
1	Luksika Kumkhum (THA)	6	6
6	Eri Hozumi (JPN)	4	2		1	Luksika Kumkhum (THA)	3	6^{5}
3	Misa Eguchi (JPN)	6	2	1	2	Wang Qiang (CHN)	6	7^{7}
2	Wang Qiang (CHN)	3	6	6

=== Top half ===
==== Section 1 ====
1st round
Shaema Al-Olfi (YEM)	6	6
Bibhuti Karki (NEP)	4	1

2nd round
1	Luksika Kumkhum (THA)	6	6
Shaema Al-Olfi (YEM)	1	0
Anastasiýa Prenko (TKM)	1	0
14	Lee Ye-ra (KOR)	6	6
10	Hsu Chieh-yu (TPE)	6	6
Wu Ho Ching (HKG)	4	0
Sara Mansoor (PAK)	0	0
5	Nigina Abduraimova (UZB)	6	6

3rd round
1	Luksika Kumkhum (THA)	6	6
14	Lee Ye-ra (KOR)	1	1
10	Hsu Chieh-yu (TPE)	6	7^{7}
5	Nigina Abduraimova (UZB)	4	6^{4}

Quarterfinals
1	Luksika Kumkhum (THA)	6	6
10	Hsu Chieh-yu (TPE)	0	2

==== Section 2 ====
1st round

2nd round
4	Duan Yingying (CHN)	6	6
Arina Beliaeva (KGZ)	1	0
Sarah Al-Balushi (OMA)	2	1
13	Kamila Kerimbayeva (KAZ)	6	6
12	Ankita Raina (IND)	6	6
Gotovyn Dulguunjargal (MGL)	0	0
Katharina Lehnert (PHI)	6^{4}	5
6	Eri Hozumi (JPN)	7^{7}	7

3rd round
4	Duan Yingying (CHN)	6	6
13	Kamila Kerimbayeva (KAZ)	2	2
12	Ankita Raina (IND)	2	6	1
6	Eri Hozumi (JPN)	6	4	6

Quarterfinals
4	Duan Yingying (CHN)	2	5
6	Eri Hozumi (JPN)	6	7

=== Bottom half ===
==== Section 3 ====
1st round

2nd round
7	Jang Su-jeong (KOR)	6	6
Jahan Baýramowa (TKM)	0	1
Andrea Ka (CAM)	2	2
11	Akgul Amanmuradova (UZB)	6	6
15	Lee Pei-chi (TPE)	6	6
Ushna Suhail (PAK)	0	2
Denise Dy (PHI)	3	0
3	Misa Eguchi (JPN)	6	6

3rd round
7	Jang Su-jeong (KOR)	5	6	2
11	Akgul Amanmuradova (UZB)	7	3	6
15	Lee Pei-chi (TPE)	2	1
3	Misa Eguchi (JPN)	6	6

Quarterfinals
11	Akgul Amanmuradova (UZB)	1	6	3
3	Misa Eguchi (JPN)	6	4	6

==== Section 4 ====
1st round

2nd round
8	Zhang Ling (HKG)	6	6
Erdenebatyn Erdenesüren (MGL)	0	0
Natasha Palha (IND)	5	3
9	Noppawan Lertcheewakarn (THA)	7	6
16	Fatma Al-Nabhani (OMA)	6	6
Anne Mathema (NEP)	0	0
Ksenia Palkina (KGZ)	4	0
2	Wang Qiang (CHN)	6	6

3rd round
8	Zhang Ling (HKG)	6	6
9	Noppawan Lertcheewakarn (THA)	2	1
16	Fatma Al-Nabhani (OMA)	3	3
2	Wang Qiang (CHN)	6	6

Quarterfinals
8	Zhang Ling (HKG)	4	4
2	Wang Qiang (CHN)	6	6
