= Tennis at the 2014 Asian Games – Women's doubles =

Women's doubles at the 2014 Asian Games
- Venue: Yeorumul Tennis Courts
- Dates: 24–29 September 2014
- Competitors: 42 from 12 nations

Medalists
| gold medal | Luksika Kumkhum; Tamarine Tanasugarn | Thailand |
| silver medal | Hsieh Su-wei; Chan Chin-wei | Chinese Taipei |
| bronze medal | Chan Hao-ching; Latisha Chan | Chinese Taipei |
| bronze medal | Sania Mirza; Prarthana Thombare | India |

Women's doubles
- Tennis at the 2014 Asian Games

Events
| Singles | men | women |
| Doubles | men | women | mixed |
| Team | men | women |
- Asian Games

The women's doubles tennis event at the 2014 Asian Games took place at the Yeorumul Tennis Courts, Incheon, South Korea from 24 September to 29 September 2014.

== Schedule ==
All times are Korea Standard Time (UTC+09:00)

| Date | Time | Event |
|---|---|---|
| Wednesday, 24 September 2014 | 14:00 | 1st round |
| Thursday, 25 September 2014 | 13:00 | 2nd round |
| Friday, 26 September 2014 | 13:00 | 2nd round |
| Saturday, 27 September 2014 | 13:30 | Quarterfinals |
| Sunday, 28 September 2014 | 13:30 | Semifinals |
| Monday, 29 September 2014 | 18:25 | Final |

== Results ==
=== Final ===
| Final |
| 7 | Luksika Kumkhum (THA); Tamarine Tanasugarn (THA) | 5 | 6 | [10] |
| 2 | Hsieh Su-wei (TPE); Chan Chin-wei (TPE) | 7 | 3 | 3 |

=== Top half ===
1st round
Altansarnaigiin Jargal (MGL); Erdenebatyn Erdenesüren (MGL) | 6 | 6
Mahika Rana (NEP); Mayanka Rana (NEP) | 0 | 2
Sara Mansoor (PAK); Ushna Suhail (PAK) | 4 | 0
Shweta Rana (IND); Rishika Sunkara (IND) | 6 | 6
Eudice Chong (HKG); Zhang Ling (HKG) | 2 | 6 | [10]
Arina Folts (UZB); Sabina Sharipova (UZB) | 6 | 4 | [8]

2nd round
1 | Chan Hao-ching (TPE); Latisha Chan (TPE) | 6 | 6
Altansarnaigiin Jargal (MGL); Erdenebatyn Erdenesüren (MGL) | 1 | 1
Duan Yingying (CHN); Zheng Saisai (CHN) | 6 | 3 | [10]
6 | Han Na-lae (KOR); Yoo Mi (KOR) | 2 | 6 | [8]
3 | Shuko Aoyama (JPN); Eri Hozumi (JPN) | 6 | 6
Shweta Rana (IND); Rishika Sunkara (IND) | 1 | 4
Eudice Chong (HKG); Zhang Ling (HKG) | 4 | 4
7 | Luksika Kumkhum (THA); Tamarine Tanasugarn (THA) | 6 | 6

Quarterfinals
1 | Chan Hao-ching (TPE); Latisha Chan (TPE) | 6 | 6
Duan Yingying (CHN); Zheng Saisai (CHN) | 2 | 4
3 | Shuko Aoyama (JPN); Eri Hozumi (JPN) | 6 | 2 | [8]
7 | Luksika Kumkhum (THA); Tamarine Tanasugarn (THA) | 1 | 6 | [10]

Semifinals
1 | Chan Hao-ching (TPE); Latisha Chan (TPE) | 4 | 4
7 | Luksika Kumkhum (THA); Tamarine Tanasugarn (THA) | 6 | 6

=== Bottom half ===
1st round
Sarah Al-Balushi (OMA); Fatma Al-Nabhani (OMA) | 7 | 4 | [10]
Venise Chan (HKG); Katherine Ip (HKG) | 5 | 6 | [7]
Choi Ji-hee (KOR); Lee So-ra (KOR) | 5 | 4
Liu Fangzhou (CHN); Wang Qiang (CHN) | 7 | 6

2nd round
5 | Sania Mirza (IND); Prarthana Thombare (IND) | 6 | 6
Enkhbayaryn Bolor (MGL); Gotovyn Dulguunjargal (MGL) | 0 | 0
Sarah Al-Balushi (OMA); Fatma Al-Nabhani (OMA) | 1 | 1
4 | Peangtarn Plipuech (THA); Nicha Lertpitaksinchai (THA) | 6 | 6
8 | Nigina Abduraimova (UZB); Akgul Amanmuradova (UZB) | 6 | 6
Bijisha Shrestha (NEP); Ira Mehernissa Rawat (NEP) | 0 | 0
Liu Fangzhou (CHN); Wang Qiang (CHN) | 2 | 0
2 | Hsieh Su-wei (TPE); Chan Chin-wei (TPE) | 6 | 6

Quarterfinals
5 | Sania Mirza (IND); Prarthana Thombare (IND) | 6 | 7^{7}
4 | Peangtarn Plipuech (THA); Nicha Lertpitaksinchai (THA) | 1 | 6^{4}
8 | Nigina Abduraimova (UZB); Akgul Amanmuradova (UZB) | 1 | 1
2 | Hsieh Su-wei (TPE); Chan Chin-wei (TPE) | 6 | 6

Semifinals
5 | Sania Mirza (IND); Prarthana Thombare (IND) | 6^{1} | 6 | [4]
2 | Hsieh Su-wei (TPE); Chan Chin-wei (TPE) | 7^{7} | 2 | [10]
