= Tennis at the 2014 Asian Games – Women's team =

Women's team at the 2014 Asian Games
- Venue: Yeorumul Tennis Courts
- Dates: 20–24 September 2014
- Competitors: 50 from 15 nations

Medalists
| gold medal | Chinese Taipei; Chan Chin-wei, Chan Hao-ching, Latisha Chan, Hsieh Su-wei |
| silver medal | China; Duan Yingying, Zhang Shuai, Zheng Saisai, Zheng Jie |
| bronze medal | Japan; Misa Eguchi, Eri Hozumi, Risa Ozaki |
| bronze medal | Kazakhstan; Kamila Kerimbayeva, Yulia Putintseva, Yaroslava Shvedova |

Women's team
- Tennis at the 2014 Asian Games

Events
| Singles | men | women |
| Doubles | men | women | mixed |
| Team | men | women |
- Asian Games

The women's team tennis competition was held at the 2014 Asian Games. China were the defending champions.

Each tie is the best of three rubbers, two singles and one doubles match.

== Schedule ==
All times are Korea Standard Time (UTC+09:00)

| Date | Time | Event |
|---|---|---|
| Saturday, 20 September 2014 | 10:30 | 1st round |
| Sunday, 21 September 2014 | 10:30 | 1st round |
| Monday, 22 September 2014 | 10:30 | Quarterfinals |
| Tuesday, 23 September 2014 | 10:30 | Semifinals |
| Wednesday, 24 September 2014 | 10:30 | Final |

== Results ==
1st round
Pakistan | 0
Hong Kong | 3
3 | Japan | 3
Turkmenistan | 0
Philippines | 0
South Korea | 3
Nepal | 0
Chinese Taipei | 3
Uzbekistan | 1
4 | Thailand | 2
Oman | 0
India | 3
Mongolia | 0
2 | Kazakhstan | 3

Quarterfinals
1 | China | 3
Hong Kong | 0
3 | Japan | 2
South Korea | 1
Chinese Taipei | 2
4 | Thailand | 1
India | 1
2 | Kazakhstan | 2

Semifinals
1 | China | 3
3 | Japan | 0
Chinese Taipei | 2
2 | Kazakhstan | 1

Final
1 | China | 1
Chinese Taipei | 2

=== 1st round ===
| 20 September | Pakistan | 0–3 | Hong Kong |

Sara Mansoor | 0–2 | Eudice Chong | 0–6, 0–6
Ushna Suhail | 0–2 | Zhang Ling | 1–6, 1–6
Sara Mansoor / Ushna Suhail | 0–2 | Venise Chan / Katherine Ip | 0–6, 3–6

| 21 September | Japan | 3–0 | Turkmenistan |

Risa Ozaki | 2–0 | Jahan Baýramowa | 6–1, 6–0
Eri Hozumi | 2–0 | Anastasiýa Prenko | 6–1, 6–1
Misa Eguchi / Risa Ozaki | 2–0 | Jahan Baýramowa / Anastasiýa Prenko | 6–2, 6–1

| 21 September | Philippines | 0–3 | South Korea |

Denise Dy | 0–2 | Han Na-lae | 0–6, 3–6
Katharina Lehnert | 0–2 | Jang Su-jeong | 3–6, 5–7
Denise Dy / Katharina Lehnert | 0–2 | Han Na-lae / Yoo Mi | 3–6, 2–6

| 20 September | Nepal | 0–3 | Chinese Taipei |

Mayanka Rana | 0–2 | Chan Chin-wei | 0–6, 0–6
Mahika Rana | 0–2 | Hsieh Su-wei | 0–6, 1–6
Bibhuti Karki / Bijisha Shrestha | 0–2 | Chan Hao-ching / Latisha Chan | 0–6, 0–6

| 20 September | Uzbekistan | 1–2 | Thailand |

Akgul Amanmuradova | 0–2 | Tamarine Tanasugarn | 2–6, 4–6
Nigina Abduraimova | 2–0 | Luksika Kumkhum | 7–6^{(7–5)}, 7–6^{(7–5)}
Nigina Abduraimova / Akgul Amanmuradova | 0–2 | Tamarine Tanasugarn / Noppawan Lertcheewakarn | 3–6, 0–6

| 20 September | Oman | 0–3 | India |

Sarah Al-Balushi | 0–2 | Prarthana Thombare | 0–6, 1–6
Fatma Al-Nabhani | 1–2 | Ankita Raina | 4–6, 6–2, 3–6
Sarah Al-Balushi / Fatma Al-Nabhani | 0–2 | Natasha Palha / Rishika Sunkara | Walkover

| 20 September | Mongolia | 0–3 | Kazakhstan |

Altansarnaigiin Jargal | 0–2 | Kamila Kerimbayeva | 0–6, 2–6
Erdenebatyn Erdenesüren | 0–2 | Yaroslava Shvedova | 1–6, 0–6
Altansarnaigiin Jargal / Erdenebatyn Erdenesüren | 0–2 | Kamila Kerimbayeva / Yulia Putintseva | 1–6, 3–6

=== Quarterfinals ===
| 22 September | China | 3–0 | Hong Kong |

Duan Yingying | 2–0 | Eudice Chong | 6–0, 6–3
Zheng Saisai | 2–0 | Zhang Ling | 6–4, 6–2
Zheng Jie / Zheng Saisai | 2–0 | Venise Chan / Katherine Ip | 6–3, 6–2

| 22 September | Japan | 2–1 | South Korea |

Eri Hozumi | 2–1 | Han Na-lae | 6–7^{(13–15)}, 6–3, 6–1
Misa Eguchi | 2–0 | Jang Su-jeong | 6–2, 6–4
Misa Eguchi / Risa Ozaki | 0–2 | Lee Ye-ra / Yoo Mi | 6–7^{(1–7)}, 4–6

| 22 September | Chinese Taipei | 2–1 | Thailand |

Latisha Chan | 2–1 | Tamarine Tanasugarn | 2–6, 6–3, 7–6^{(7–4)}
Hsieh Su-wei | 1–2 | Luksika Kumkhum | 2–6, 6–3, 1–6
Latisha Chan / Hsieh Su-wei | 2–0 | Tamarine Tanasugarn / Luksika Kumkhum | 6–2, 6–2

| 22 September | India | 1–2 | Kazakhstan |

Prarthana Thombare | 0–2 | Yulia Putintseva | 3–6, 2–6
Ankita Raina | 0–2 | Yaroslava Shvedova | 5–7, 6–7^{(3–7)}
Natasha Palha / Rishika Sunkara | 2–0 | Yulia Putintseva / Kamila Kerimbayeva | 3–2, Retired

=== Semifinals ===
| 23 September | China | 3–0 | Japan |

Duan Yingying | 2–0 | Eri Hozumi | 6–1, 6–1
Zheng Saisai | 2–0 | Misa Eguchi | 7–6^{(7–2)}, 6–3
Zheng Jie / Zheng Saisai | 2–0 | Eri Hozumi / Risa Ozaki | 7–5, 6–4

| 23 September | Chinese Taipei | 2–1 | Kazakhstan |

Latisha Chan | 2–0 | Yulia Putintseva | 6–4, 6–1
Hsieh Su-wei | 0–2 | Yaroslava Shvedova | 3–6, 6–7^{(4–7)}
Latisha Chan / Hsieh Su-wei | 2–0 | Yulia Putintseva / Yaroslava Shvedova | 6–0, 6–2

=== Final ===
| 24 September | China | 1–2 | Chinese Taipei |

Duan Yingying | 0–2 | Latisha Chan | 6–7^{(8–10)}, 6–7^{(4–7)}
Zheng Jie | 2–1 | Hsieh Su-wei | 3–6, 7–5, 6–2
Zhang Shuai / Zheng Jie | 0–2 | Latisha Chan / Hsieh Su-wei | 2–6, 5–7

== Non-participating athletes ==
- Enkhbayaryn Bolor (MGL)
- Gotovyn Dulguunjargal (MGL)
- Varatchaya Wongteanchai (THA)
- Arina Folts (UZB)
- Sabina Sharipova (UZB)
