= Aleksandr Ernepesov =

Turkmen tennis player

- Country (sports): Turkmenistan
- Born: 27 February 1995 (age 31) Ashgabat, Turkmenistan
- Height: 1.82 m (5 ft 11 1/2 in)
- Plays: Right-handed
- Prize money: $104

Singles
- Career record: 0–0 (at ATP Tour level, Grand Slam level)
- Career titles: 0; 0 Challenger, 0 Futures

Doubles
- Career record: 0–0 (at ATP Tour level, Grand Slam level)
- Career titles: 0; 0 Challenger, 0 Futures

Team competitions
- Davis Cup: 21–18
- Last updated on: 31 January 2018.

Aleksandr Ernepesov (born 27 February 1995) is a Turkmen tennis player.

Ernepesov hasn't a career high ATP singles ranking yet.

Ernepesov has represented Turkmenistan at Davis Cup, where he has a win–loss record of 21–18.

He played at the 2014 Asian Games on singles he lost in the 2nd round against the late winner Yoshihito Nishioka, in doubles with Georgiý Poçaý lost in the 2nd round against Gong Maoxin-Li Zhe Chinese duo.
