= Tennis at the 2014 Asian Games =

- Venue: Yeorumul Tennis Courts
- Dates: 20–30 September 2014
- Competitors: 153 from 24 nations

Tennis at the 2014 Asian Games was held at the Yeorumul Tennis Courts, in Incheon, South Korea from 20 September to 30 September 2014.

A total of 153 tennis players from 24 nations competed in tennis at the 2014 Asian Games, Chinese Taipei finished first at the medal table by winning five medals.

== Schedule ==
P	Preliminary rounds	¼	Quarterfinals	½	Semifinals	F	Final

Event↓/Date →	20th Sat	21st Sun	22nd Mon	23rd Tue	24th Wed	25th Thu	26th Fri	27th Sat	28th Sun	29th Mon	30th Tue
Men's singles					P	P	P	¼	½		F
Men's doubles					P	P	P	¼	½	F	
Men's team	P	P	¼	½	F						
Women's singles					P	P	P	¼	½		F
Women's doubles					P	P	P	¼	½	F	
Women's team	P	P	¼	½	F						
Mixed doubles						P	P	¼	½	F	

== Medalists ==
Event	Gold	Silver	Bronze
Men's singles	Yoshihito Nishioka; Japan	Lu Yen-hsun; Chinese Taipei	Yuichi Sugita; Japan
Men's singles	Yoshihito Nishioka; Japan	Lu Yen-hsun; Chinese Taipei	Yuki Bhambri; India
Men's doubles	South Korea; Chung Hyeon; Lim Yong-kyu	India; Saketh Myneni; Sanam Singh	Thailand; Sanchai Ratiwatana; Sonchat Ratiwatana
Men's doubles	South Korea; Chung Hyeon; Lim Yong-kyu	India; Saketh Myneni; Sanam Singh	India; Yuki Bhambri; Divij Sharan
Men's team	Kazakhstan; Andrey Golubev; Mikhail Kukushkin; Aleksandr Nedovyesov	China; Gong Maoxin; Li Zhe; Wu Di; Zhang Ze	Uzbekistan; Farrukh Dustov; Sanjar Fayziev; Temur Ismailov; Denis Istomin
Men's team	Kazakhstan; Andrey Golubev; Mikhail Kukushkin; Aleksandr Nedovyesov	China; Gong Maoxin; Li Zhe; Wu Di; Zhang Ze	Japan; Tatsuma Ito; Yoshihito Nishioka; Yuichi Sugita; Yasutaka Uchiyama
Women's singles	Wang Qiang; China	Luksika Kumkhum; Thailand	Eri Hozumi; Japan
Women's singles	Wang Qiang; China	Luksika Kumkhum; Thailand	Misa Eguchi; Japan
Women's doubles	Thailand; Luksika Kumkhum; Tamarine Tanasugarn	Chinese Taipei; Hsieh Su-wei; Chan Chin-wei	Chinese Taipei; Chan Hao-ching; Latisha Chan
Women's doubles	Thailand; Luksika Kumkhum; Tamarine Tanasugarn	Chinese Taipei; Hsieh Su-wei; Chan Chin-wei	India; Sania Mirza; Prarthana Thombare
Women's team	Chinese Taipei; Chan Chin-wei; Chan Hao-ching; Latisha Chan; Hsieh Su-wei	China; Duan Yingying; Zhang Shuai; Zheng Jie; Zheng Saisai	Japan; Misa Eguchi; Eri Hozumi; Risa Ozaki
Women's team	Chinese Taipei; Chan Chin-wei; Chan Hao-ching; Latisha Chan; Hsieh Su-wei	China; Duan Yingying; Zhang Shuai; Zheng Jie; Zheng Saisai	Kazakhstan; Kamila Kerimbayeva; Yulia Putintseva; Yaroslava Shvedova
Mixed doubles	India; Saketh Myneni; Sania Mirza	Chinese Taipei; Peng Hsien-yin; Chan Hao-ching	Japan; Yuichi Sugita; Shuko Aoyama
Mixed doubles	India; Saketh Myneni; Sania Mirza	Chinese Taipei; Peng Hsien-yin; Chan Hao-ching	China; Zhang Ze; Zheng Jie

== Medal table ==
Rank	Nation	Gold	Silver	Bronze	Total
1	Chinese Taipei (TPE)	1	3	1	5
2	China (CHN)	1	2	1	4
3	India (IND)	1	1	3	5
4	Thailand (THA)	1	1	1	3
5	Japan (JPN)	1	0	6	7
6	Kazakhstan (KAZ)	1	0	1	2
7	South Korea (KOR)	1	0	0	1
8	Uzbekistan (UZB)	0	0	1	1
Totals (8 entries)		7	7	14	28

== Participating nations ==
A total of 153 athletes from 24 nations competed in tennis at the 2014 Asian Games:

- Bhutan (1)
- Cambodia (3)
- China (12)
- Chinese Taipei (11)
- Hong Kong (10)
- India (10)
- Indonesia (4)
- Japan (8)
- Kazakhstan (6)
- Kuwait (2)
- Kyrgyzstan (4)
- Macau (2)
- Mongolia (8)
- Nepal (12)
- Oman (4)
- Pakistan (4)
- Philippines (5)
- Qatar (4)
- Saudi Arabia (6)
- South Korea (11)
- Thailand (11)
- Turkmenistan (5)
- Uzbekistan (8)
- Yemen (2)
