= Kamila Kerimbayeva =

Kazakhstani tennis player

Kamila Kerimbayeva Камила Керімбаева
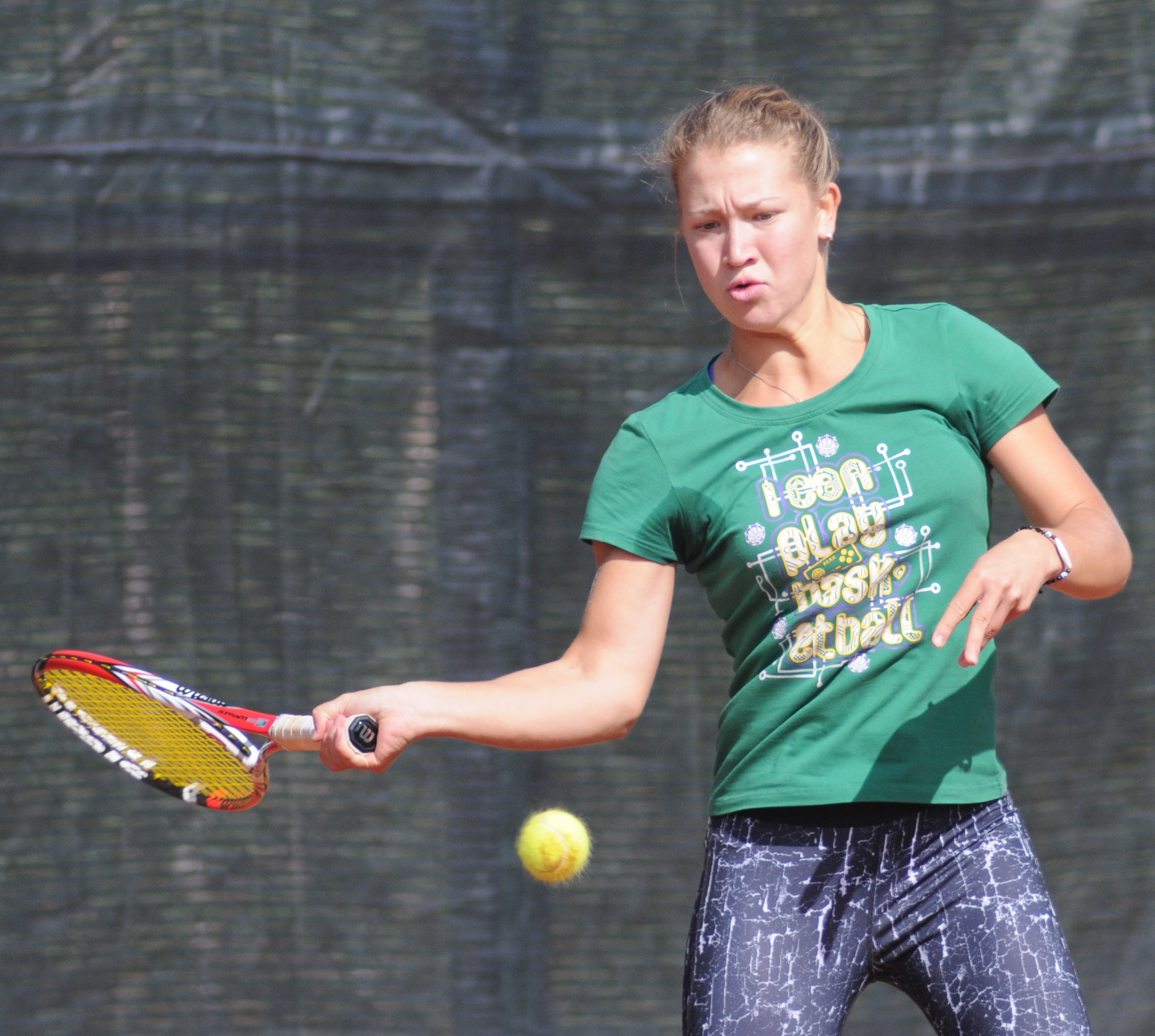
- Country (sports): Kazakhstan
- Born: 18 June 1995 (age 31) Almaty
- Plays: Right (two-handed backhand)
- Prize money: $81,022

Singles
- Career record: 221–150
- Career titles: 10 ITF
- Highest ranking: No. 291 (31 March 2014)

Doubles
- Career record: 135–110
- Career titles: 8 ITF
- Highest ranking: No. 303 (27 February 2017)
Medal record
Representing Kazakhstan
Women's tennis
Asian Games
Bronze medal – third place	2014 Incheon	Team event

Kamila Kerimbayeva (Kazakh: Камила Сапарғалиқызы Керімбаева, Kamila Kerımbaeva; born 18 June 1995) is a former tennis player from Kazakhstan.

She has career-high WTA rankings of 291 in singles and 303 in doubles, and won 18 titles (ten in singles) on the ITF Women's Circuit.

Playing for the Kazakhstan Fed Cup team, Kerimbayeva has a win–loss record of 2–3.

On 25 September 2017, she was suspended from tennis for two years due to doping.

== ITF Circuit finals ==
=== Singles: 16 (10 titles, 6 runner-ups) ===
Legend $25,000 tournaments $15,000 tournaments $10,000 tournaments	Finals by surface Hard (4–6) Clay (6–0)

Result	No.	Date	Tournament	Surface	Opponent	Score
Loss	1.	25 June 2012	ITF Sharm El Sheikh, Egypt	Hard	(Russia) Anna Morgina	3–6, 1–6
Loss	2.	6 May 2013	ITF Shymkent, Kazakhstan	Hard (i)	(Kyrgyzstan) Ksenia Palkina	3–6, 7–5, 1–6
Win	1.	2 June 2013	ITF Sharm El Sheikh, Egypt	Hard (i)	(Ukraine) Vladyslava Zanosiyenko	6–2, 6–4
Win	2.	17 November 2013	ITF Astana, Kazakhstan	Hard (i)	(Uzbekistan) Albina Khabibulina	6–1, 6–3
Loss	3.	2 December 2013	ITF Pune, India	Hard	(Poland) Magda Linette	5–7, 6–7^{(5)}
Loss	4.	15 March 2014	ITF Astana, Kazakhstan	Hard (i)	(Russia) Natalia Orlova	6–4, 5–7, 1–6
Loss	5.	30 November 2014	ITF Astana, Kazakhstan	Hard (i)	(Russia) Ekaterina Yashina	3–6, 4–6
Win	3.	17 October 2015	ITF Shymkent, Kazakhstan	Clay	(Georgia (country)) Ekaterine Gorgodze	6–2, 6–2
Loss	6.	8 November 2015	ITF Sharm El Sheikh, Egypt	Hard	(Russia) Anastasia Pribylova	2–6, 6–7^{(5)}
Win	4.	9 November 2015	ITF Sharm El Sheikh	Hard	(Montenegro) Ana Veselinović	3–6, 6–1, 6–2
Win	5.	31 January 2016	ITF Cairo, Egypt	Clay	(Slovakia) Chantal Škamlová	6–4, 4–6, 6–1
Win	6.	23 April 2016	ITF Shymkent, Kazakhstan	Clay	(Russia) Ekaterina Kazionova	6–4, 6–4
Win	7.	12 June 2016	ITF Baku, Azerbaijan	Hard	(Russia) Valeriya Zeleva	6–3, 6–2
Win	8.	24 September 2016	ITF Shymkent, Kazakhstan	Clay	(Russia) Daria Kruzhkova	7–5, 6–3
Win	9.	8 October 2016	ITF Shymkent, Kazakhstan	Clay	(Kazakhstan) Gozal Ainitdinova	6–0, 6–4
Win	10.	15 April 2017	ITF Shymkent, Kazakhstan	Clay	(Uzbekistan) Albina Khabibulina	6–4, 6–0

=== Doubles: 21 (8 titles, 13 runner-ups) ===
Legend $25,000 tournaments $15,000 tournaments $10,000 tournaments	Finals by surface Hard (5–9) Clay (3–4)

Result	No.	Date	Tournament	Surface	Partner	Opponents	Score
Win	1.	17 October 2011	ITF Almaty, Kazakhstan	Hard (i)	(Kazakhstan) Anna Danilina	(Czech Republic) Nikola Fraňková (Kazakhstan) Zalina Khairudinova	6–3, 6–1
Loss	1.	25 June 2012	ITF Sharm El Sheikh, Egypt	Hard	(Kazakhstan) Zalina Khairudinova	(Russia) Ekaterina Yashina (Russia) Polina Monova	5–7, 6–4, [8–10]
Loss	2.	18 February 2013	ITF Shymkent, Kazakhstan	Hard	(Uzbekistan) Sabina Sharipova	(Ukraine) Diana Bogoliy (Russia) Alena Tarasova	4–6, 6–1, [4–10]
Win	2.	17 October 2011	ITF Almaty, Kazakhstan	Hard (i)	(China) Yang Yi	(Czech Republic) Dariya Berezhnaya (Ukraine) Vladyslava Zanosiyenko	6–1, 4–6, [10–4]
Loss	3.	20 May 2013	ITF Sharm El Sheikh, Egypt	Hard	(United Kingdom) Anna Fitzpatrick	(Italy) Camilla Rosatello (China) Zhu Ai Wen	4–6, 3–6
Win	3.	26 August 2013	ITF Mamaia, Romania	Clay	(Germany) Christina Shakovets	(Romania) Diana Buzean (Spain) Inés Ferrer Suárez	6–3, 7–5
Loss	4.	24 February 2014	ITF Astana, Kazakhstan	Hard (i)	(Ukraine) Veronika Kapshay	(Uzbekistan) Albina Khabibulina (Kyrgyzstan) Ksenia Palkina	4–6, 5–7
Loss	5.	30 November 2014	ITF Astana, Kazakhstan	Hard (i)	(Russia) Ekaterina Yashina	(Uzbekistan) Albina Khabibulina (Uzbekistan) Polina Merenkova	2–6, 2–6
Win	4.	14 February 2015	ITF Sharm El Sheikh, Egypt	Hard	(Russia) Aminat Kushkhova	(Ukraine) Diana Bogoliy (Russia) Polina Leykina	6–3, 6–1
Loss	6.	16 March 2015	ITF Antalya, Turkey	Hard	(Ukraine) Alyona Sotnikova	(Romania) Cristina Ene (Romania) Ioana Loredana Roșca	2–6, 3–6
Loss	7.	10 April 2015	ITF Qarshi, Uzbekistan	Hard	(Russia) Ksenia Lykina	(Russia) Valentyna Ivakhnenko (Russia) Polina Monova	1–6, 3–6
Loss	8.	17 October 2015	ITF Shymkent, Kazakhstan	Clay	(Russia) Margarita Lazareva	(Georgia (country)) Ekaterine Gorgodze (Georgia (country)) Sofia Kvatsabaia	5–7, 2–6
Win	5.	14 November 2015	ITF Sharm El Sheikh, Egypt	Hard	(Montenegro) Ana Veselinović	(Romania) Ana Bianca Mihăilă (Belgium) Hélène Scholsen	w/o
Loss	9.	6 February 2016	ITF Sharm El Sheikh, Egypt	Hard	(Egypt) Ola Abou Zekry	(Germany) Nora Niedmers (Germany) Julia Wachaczyk	2–6, 2–6
Loss	10.	22 April 2016	ITF Shymkent, Kazakhstan	Clay	(Russia) Anastasia Frolova	(Belarus) Ilona Kremen (Belarus) Sviatlana Pirazhenka	6–4, 6–7^{(4)}, [8–10]
Loss	11.	29 April 2016	ITF Shymkent, Kazakhstan	Clay	(Russia) Anastasia Frolova	(Belarus) Ilona Kremen (Belarus) Sviatlana Pirazhenka	3–6, 4–6
Win	6.	10 June 2016	ITF Baku, Azerbaijan	Hard	(Singapore) Stefanie Tan	(Ukraine) Katya Malikova (Ukraine) Angelina Shakhraychuk	6–2, 6–3
Win	7.	7 October 2016	ITF Shymkent, Kazakhstan	Clay	(Russia) Yana Sizikova	(Russia) Anna Pribylova (Germany) Julyette Steur	6–2, 6–3
Win	8.	18 February 2017	ITF Hammamet, Tunisia	Clay	(Slovakia) Vivien Juhászová	(Greece) Eleni Kordolaimi (Belarus) Sviatlana Pirazhenka	3–6, 6–4, [10–8]
Loss	12.	26 January 2020	ITF Cairo, Egypt	Clay	(Moldova) Vitalia Stamat	(Belgium) Hélène Scholsen (Slovakia) Chantal Škamlová	7–6^{(4)}, 1–6, [7–10]
Loss	13.	10 October 2020	ITF Sharm El Sheikh, Egypt	Hard	(Kazakhstan) Yekaterina Dmitrichenko	(Kazakhstan) Gozal Ainitdinova (Kazakhstan) Zhibek Kulambayeva	1–6, 6–2, [10–12]
