= Hsieh Su-wei =

Taiwanese tennis player (born 1986)

Hsieh Su-wei 謝淑薇
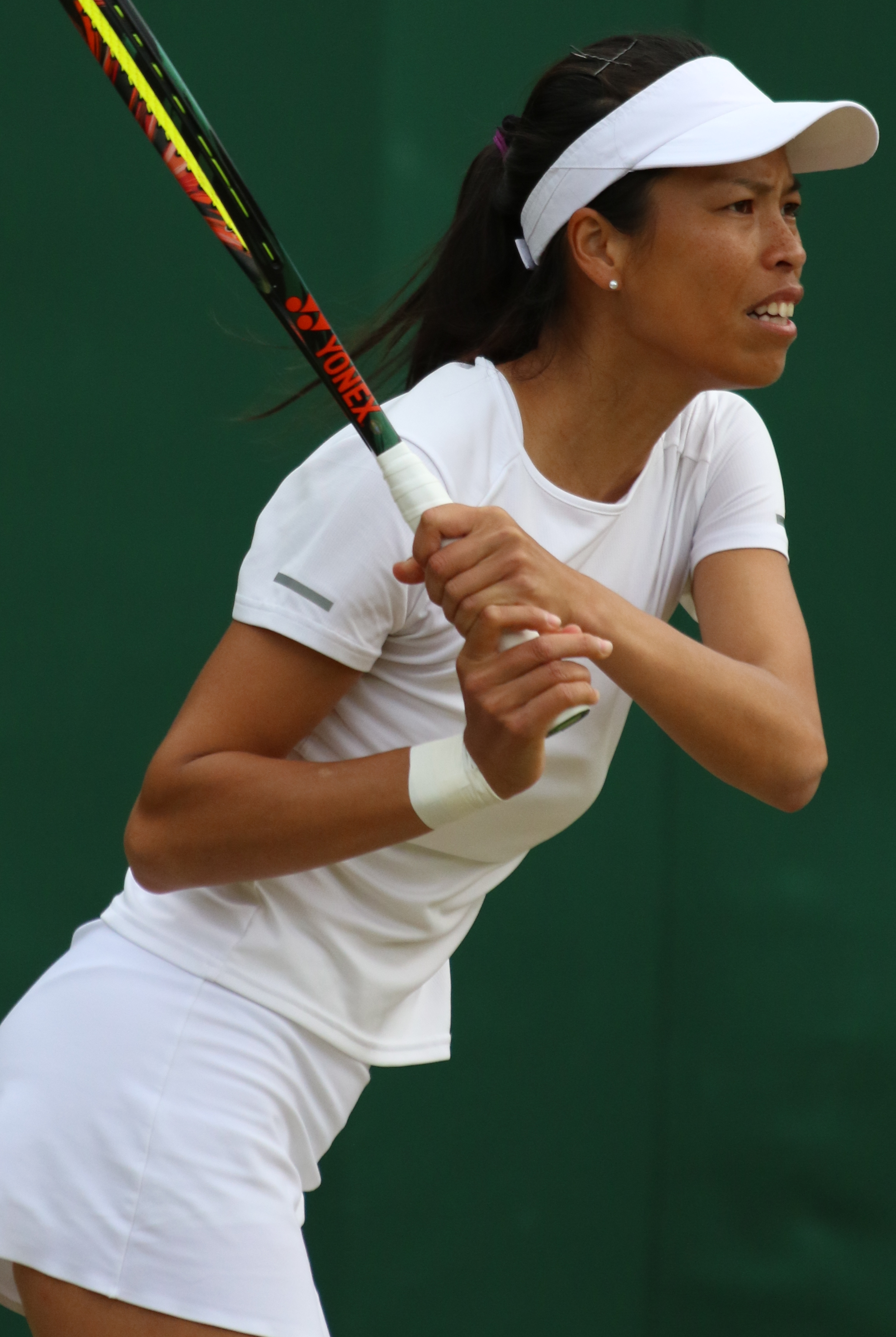
- Hsieh at the 2019 Wimbledon Championships
- Country (sports): Chinese Taipei
- Residence: Taipei, Taiwan
- Born: 4 January 1986 (age 40) Hsinchu, Taiwan
- Height: 1.69 m (5 ft 7 in)
- Turned pro: 2001
- Plays: Right-handed (two-handed both sides)
- Coach: Cara Black (2024–present)
- Prize money: $13,076,742

Singles
- Career record: 524–345
- Career titles: 3
- Highest ranking: No. 23 (25 February 2013)

Grand Slam singles results
- Australian Open: QF (2021)
- French Open: 3R (2017)
- Wimbledon: 4R (2018)
- US Open: 2R (2008, 2013, 2018, 2019, 2021)

Other tournaments
- Olympic Games: 1R (2012)

Doubles
- Career record: 631–315
- Career titles: 36
- Highest ranking: No. 1 (12 May 2014)
- Current ranking: No. 10 (28 September 2026)

Grand Slam doubles results
- Australian Open: W (2024)
- French Open: W (2014, 2023)
- Wimbledon: W (2013, 2019, 2021, 2023)
- US Open: SF (2012, 2023)

Other doubles tournaments
- Tour Finals: W (2013)
- Olympic Games: QF (2012, 2024)

Mixed doubles
- Career titles: 2

Grand Slam mixed doubles results
- Australian Open: W (2024)
- French Open: SF (2024)
- Wimbledon: W (2024)
- US Open: SF (2009)

Team competitions
- Fed Cup: 21–12
- Hopman Cup: 3–8
Medal record
Women's tennis
Representing Chinese Taipei
Asian Games
Gold medal – first place	2006 Doha	Team
Gold medal – first place	2014 Incheon	Team
Gold medal – first place	2026 Aichi-Nagoya	Doubles
Silver medal – second place	2010 Guangzhou	Doubles
Silver medal – second place	2010 Guangzhou	Team
Silver medal – second place	2014 Incheon	Doubles
Bronze medal – third place	2002 Busan	Team
Bronze medal – third place	2006 Doha	Mixed doubles
Bronze medal – third place	2026 Aichi-Nagoya	Mixed doubles
Universiade
Gold medal – first place	2005 Izmir	Doubles
Bronze medal – third place	2005 Izmir	Singles
- Last updated on: 1 August 2026.

Hsieh Su-wei
- Traditional Chinese: 謝淑薇
- Simplified Chinese: 谢淑薇
Transcriptions
Standard Mandarin
- Hanyu Pinyin: Xiè Shúwéi (Taiwan); Xiè Shūwēi (mainland)
- IPA: [ɕjê sǔ wěɪ] (Taiwan) [ɕjê ʂú wéɪ] (mainland)
Southern Min
- Hokkien POJ: Siā Siok-bî

Hsieh Su-wei (Chinese: 謝淑薇; pinyin: Xiè Shúwéi; pronounced [ɕjê ʂǔ wěɪ]; born 4 January 1986) is a Taiwanese professional tennis player. A former world No. 1 in doubles with nine Grand Slam titles, she is regarded as one of the most successful and versatile doubles players in history. She is the highest-ranked Taiwanese player in history in both singles and doubles. She is known for playing with two hands on both sides, flat and quick groundstrokes, crafty and wily gameplay, aggressive volleys, and unorthodox variety of shots.

Hsieh reached her career-high singles ranking of No. 23 on 25 February 2013. On 12 May 2014, she reached No. 1 in the doubles rankings. She spent a total of 59 weeks with the top doubles ranking, the longest tenure by a tennis player from East Asia, and second-longest of any Asian player after Sania Mirza's 91 weeks. She has finished with a year-end top 10 doubles ranking eight times, including the year-end world No. 1 in 2020.

Hsieh has won three singles and 36 doubles titles on the WTA Tour, one WTA 125 doubles title, 27 singles and 23 doubles titles on the ITF Women's Circuit, seven medals at the Asian Games (two gold, three silver, and two bronze), and one gold and one bronze medal at the 2005 Summer Universiade. She has amassed nearly $13 million in prize money.

She has won seven major titles in women's doubles: at the 2013 Wimbledon Championships and the 2014 French Open with Peng Shuai, the 2019 and 2023 Wimbledon Championships with Barbora Strýcová, the 2021 Wimbledon Championships and the 2024 Australian Open with Elise Mertens, and the 2023 French Open with Wang Xinyu. Hsieh has also won two major titles in mixed doubles, winning with Jan Zieliński the 2024 Australian Open and the 2024 Wimbledon Championships.

Most of her singles success came on hardcourts, where she won all three of her WTA Tour titles, reached a Premier 5 semifinal at Dubai in 2019, defeated world No. 1, Naomi Osaka, to reach a Premier Mandatory quarterfinal at the 2019 Miami Open, and made the quarterfinals at the 2021 Australian Open, where she became the first Taiwanese woman to reach a major singles quarterfinal and, at 35, the oldest debutant Grand Slam singles quarterfinalist. She has also been successful on other surfaces, reaching the third round of the French Open in 2017 and defeating world No. 1, Simona Halep, to reach the fourth round at Wimbledon in 2018. Hsieh has beaten several top 15, top 10, and top 5 players.

Upon her retirement from singles in 2024, commentators called her "a killer on the court [who] can produce shots that defy geometry and the laws of physics" while also being deeply respected by her colleagues for her shotmaking abilities and her charming presence on the tour.

== Biography ==
Hsieh was born to parents Hsieh Tze-lung and Ho Fom-ju in Hsinchu and raised in Kaohsiung, Taiwan. She was introduced to tennis by her father at five years of age. Her younger sister Hsieh Shu-ying and brother Hsieh Cheng-peng are also professional tennis players. Hsieh named her tennis idols as Steffi Graf and Andre Agassi. She has trained at a Taipei tennis school run by Hu Na, a former mainland Chinese player who defected to the US in 1982.

== Playing style ==
Hsieh has an unorthodox style of play. She made a quip at the 2018 Australian Open saying, "Actually, my boyfriend was looking at her [Kerber's] game earlier this morning. I forgot to ask him what she play, so, I actually have no plan to go on the court. So I was trying to go my Su-wei style, you know." Despite her slight build and comparatively short stature, her two-handed groundstrokes are flat, powerful, and are hit with depth. She incorporates sliced backhands and forehands, drop shots, lobs, volleys, and sharply angled groundstrokes into points, and has been noted for her technical mastery, intelligent style of play, and impressive point construction. For these reasons, and due to the overall completeness of her game, she has been nicknamed by commentators "The Wizard".

Many top players have praised her unusual playing style. Maria Sharapova, after her third-round win over Hsieh at Wimbledon 2012, said, "I faced her many times in the juniors. She used to be a nightmare for me because she used to slice and dropshot on clay. I was like, 'Where did they learn how to play tennis like that?' She uses both hands, switches racquets. That's her game: it's to hit a lot of dropshots and slices and get people kind of crazy. We used to have real battles in the juniors. I knew her game really well and I don't think she had time to do all of that today on grass. If I'm hitting a hard‑paced shot, I don't think she really has time to create, which is something that she really likes to do."

== Career ==
=== Early years ===
During the 2001 Australian Open Junior Grand Slam event, Hsieh reached the girls' singles quarterfinals and the round of 16 in the girls doubles event with partner Natalie Ko, losing in two sets to eventual champions Petra Cetkovská and Barbora Záhlavová-Strýcová. Hsieh displayed stunning results in the 2001 season as a 15-year-old. Playing on the ITF Women's Circuit, she won all of the five events she entered at Wellington, Kaohsiung, Bangkok (twice), and Peachtree City from January until November. Hsieh also competed in her first two WTA Tour events, reaching the semifinals in Bali and the quarterfinals in Pattaya. Although she played only seven tournaments in 2001, she had an impressive 41–2 record, in addition to starting her career with 37 wins in a row. She had success on the doubles circuit as well, reaching two finals and winning one of them. She played in the qualifying rounds of all four Grand Slam tournaments in 2002, but was unable to advance to the main draw in any of them. After a quiet 2003, Hsieh experienced an upswing in her doubles in 2004, reaching five finals on the ITF Circuit and winning a pair of titles in Incheon and New Delhi. In October 2004, she reached her first WTA doubles final at the Korea Open at the age of 18, where she and compatriot Chuang Chia-jung were beaten by hometown players Cho Yoon-jeong and Jeon Mi-ra. She made her Grand Slam main-draw debut in 2005 by qualifying at the US Open, where she was beaten by Katarina Srebotnik in the opening round. By the end of the year, she had won ten singles and eleven doubles titles on the ITF Circuit.

=== 2006–2007: First doubles titles ===
In 2006, Hsieh lost in the final qualifying round at the Australian Open to former top 20 player Tamarine Tanasugarn but won her first main draw Grand Slam match en route to the second round in the women's doubles tournament. She was more successful at the next two Grand Slams though. Qualifying to the main draw of the French Open for the first time, Hsieh was defeated in the opening round by local wildcard Mathilde Johansson. She also qualified to her first main draw at Wimbledon, but was beaten in her first match by the 23rd seed Anabel Medina Garrigues, while also losing in the first round in doubles. Hsieh failed to qualify for the US Open, though, falling at the final hurdle to Kirsten Flipkens. She was able to produce much stronger results on the ITF Circuit, reaching two singles and six doubles finals, and winning one singles and four doubles titles, respectively.

The following year, Hsieh once again failed to qualify for either the Australian or US Opens, but qualified for the main draw at both the French Open and Wimbledon, where she lost in the first round both times. In doubles, she fell in the first round at three of the Grand Slam events, but made it to the second round at the French Open. Hsieh made a breakthrough though in doubles, starting with reaching two finals in Auckland and Bangalore in the first two months of the year with different partners. She then earned the biggest wins of her career with compatriot Chuang Chia-jung as the pair won the China Open, a Tier II tournament. This marked Hsieh's first title of any kind on the WTA Tour. They won a second title together the following week at the Korea Open, where she had reached her first WTA final three years earlier. She once again performed well on the ITF Circuit level, winning a pair of titles in both singles and doubles. While she finished the year ranked No. 143 in singles, she snagged her first year-end top 50 ranking in doubles, by finishing No. 46 in the world.

=== 2008: Singles breakthrough ===
Hsieh started 2008 by winning three matches to qualify for the Australian Open, where she won her first main-draw major match, defeating Klára Zakopalová in three sets. In the second round, she beat 19th seed Sybille Bammer and defeated Aravane Rezaï in the third round to become first Taiwanese tennis player to reach the fourth round of a major. She then lost in the fourth round to the world No. 1, Justine Henin, in straight sets. The result would lift her into the top 100 for the first time. She reached the doubles final at the Thailand Open in February with Vania King, losing to compatriots Chuang and Chan Yung-jan.

In March, Hsieh played at Indian Wells, losing in the first round to Elena Vesnina in three sets. A week later, she lost again, this time in the first round of qualifying, to Tatiana Poutchek in Miami. These two defeats saw her ranking fall to No. 116.

At the end of April, Hsieh entered the ITF tournament in Incheon as the first seed, and won the tournament, defeating Chinese player Xie Yanze in three sets. As a result of this win, her ranking rose to No. 99. At the French Open, she was defeated by qualifier Anastasiya Yakimova in the first round.

In June, she had her best Wimbledon ladies' singles result to date by making it to the second round. She beat Stéphanie Cohen-Aloro in the first round, claiming her first victory in her third main draw appearance at Wimbledon, before falling to No. 9 seed and French Open runner-up Dinara Safina.

At the Cincinnati Open, Hsieh lost in the first round in singles, but made it to the finals in doubles with Kazakh partner Yaroslava Shvedova. However, the pair were topped by the Russian duo of Maria Kirilenko and Nadia Petrova in a third set super-tiebreak. She then went on to record her first main-draw win at the US Open over Evgeniya Rodina before losing to Petrova in the second round. Hsieh then managed to end the year strong by winning the Bali International with Peng Shuai, and defending her title in Korea with compatriot Chuang. She finished the year ranked inside the top 100 in singles for the first time, at No. 79, and No. 53 in doubles.

=== 2009: Top 10 debut in doubles ===
Hsieh opened the 2009 season by winning the doubles title with Peng at her first tournament of the year, the Premier-level Sydney International, defeating Nathalie Dechy and hometown favorite Casey Dellacqua in the final. At the Australian Open, she was upset by compatriot Chan Yung-jan in the first round of women's singles. As a result, she dropped out of the top 100. In women's doubles, however, she and Peng fared much better. As the 16th seeds, the pair recorded back to back three set wins to advance to the third round, where they pulled off a major upset with a straight sets win over the second seeds Anabel Medina Garrigues and Virginia Ruano Pascual, losing just one game, thereby advancing Hsieh to her first major quarterfinals. However, the pair was defeated in the last eight by the eventual champions, tenth-seeded Serena Williams and Venus Williams.

Despite struggling the rest of the year in singles, winning just one WTA Tour main-draw match at the Guangzhou International later on in September, Hsieh put together her most prolific year in doubles thus far. After a pair of early exits in Indian Wells and Stuttgart, Hsieh and Peng advanced to the final of the Italian Open, a Premier-5 tournament, where they were seeded seventh. They then defeated the fifth seeds Daniela Hantuchová and Ai Sugiyama to win the title. This was Hsieh's sixth WTA doubles title, and the biggest of her career thus far. After making the quarterfinals in Madrid, Hsieh broke into the top 20 in doubles for the first time. She concluded her clay-court season by partnering with Peng at the French Open. Seeded ninth, the two posted three easy straight set wins, including their second in a month over Hantuchová and Sugiyama, to advance to the quarterfinals. Despite being a set down, the pair managed to come back and grind out a three set win over the Polish sister duo Agnieszka and Urszula Radwańska, advancing Hsieh to her first major semifinal, However, Hsieh and Peng were beaten by Victoria Azarenka and Elena Vesnina in straight sets. Nonetheless, their strong performance lifted Hsieh inside the top 15 in doubles.

Hsieh and Peng struggled following their Roland Garros run, losing five of their next seven matches, including an opening round loss at Wimbledon, their only grass-court tournament, and a second round defeat at the US Open. Hsieh was successful though in mixed doubles at both majors, partnering Zimbabwe's Kevin Ullyett en route to a Wimbledon quarterfinal and US Open semifinal. However, the duo were able to come together at their final tournament of the year, the China Open, where they won the title without dropping a set. This was their third title of the year together, Hsieh's seventh career doubles title, her first Premier Mandatory title, and the biggest of her career. Following this result, she made her top-10 debut in the doubles rankings. She finished the year ranked No. 9 in the world in doubles.

=== 2010–2011 ===
Hsieh lost in the first round of the Guangzhou International Open to Han Xinyun. This was her only main-draw WTA Tour match of 2010.

At Wimbledon, she reached the semifinals of mixed doubles, with Australia's Paul Hanley. Partnering Zheng Jie, she won the doubles event at the Guangzhou International.

Playing primarily on the ITF Circuit for singles in 2011, Hsieh won three titles, a $25k in Mildura, a $75k in Beijing, and a $25k in Seoul, while also finishing as the runner-up at the $25k in Fergana. She also reached the quarterfinals at the Australian Open with Chuang, falling to Azarenka and Kirilenko, and won one WTA doubles title in Guangzhou with Zheng Saisai, her eighth career title and first in two years.

=== 2012: Singles resurgence: Wimbledon third round, two WTA Tour singles titles ===
Hsieh experienced a career resurgence to her singles game during the 2012 season. After falling in her second qualifying match in Melbourne, Hsieh reached her first ever WTA singles semifinal at the Pattaya Open in Thailand, after having to qualify for the main draw. This result brought her singles ranking back inside the top 150. At the next tournament, the hardcourt Malaysian Open at the beginning of March, she breezed through the qualifying tournament as the top seed, en route to advancing to her first tour singles final. Despite dropping the first set, she won the title after her opponent Petra Martić was forced to retire while trailing 4–1 in the final set due to severe cramping and fatigue. This marked Hsieh's first career singles title on the WTA Tour. She also returned to the top 100 for the first time since January 2009 following her victory. Also playing sporadically in ITF tournaments, she won the 50k tournament in Wenshan, her 21st ITF singles title. Hsieh's early season success allowed her to directly enter the main draw at the French Open, her first major main-draw appearance since the 2009 Australian Open. However, she was beaten in the first round by 18th-seed Flavia Pennetta.

Hsieh began the grass-court season by reaching the quarterfinals at the 75k event in Nottingham, falling to American CoCo Vandeweghe. She then reached her first singles quarterfinal at a WTA Tour grass-court event in Birmingham, where she was beaten by Ekaterina Makarova. She also won the doubles title with Tímea Babos over the world No. 1's, Americans Lisa Raymond and Liezel Huber, her first grass-court doubles title. Entering Wimbledon ranked inside the top 70, Hsieh scored her first win at the All England Club in four years by defeating French wildcard Virginie Razzano, who just a month earlier at the French Open became the first player ever to beat Serena Williams in the opening round of a Grand Slam tournament, in straight sets. She followed it up with a win over Stéphanie Foretz Gacon to advance to the third round of Wimbledon for the first time, and beyond the second round of a major for the first time since the 2008 Australian Open. Though she would lose at this stage to then-world No. 1 and recent French Open winner, Maria Sharapova, in straight sets, this marked Hsieh's best performance at a major in four and a half years. She also reached the quarterfinals in the mixed doubles tournament, partnering with British player Colin Fleming. Following Wimbledon, she reached a new career-high singles ranking of world No. 56.

At the Summer Olympics, she represented Taiwan in the women's singles tournament and in women's doubles with Chuang Chia-jung. Although she was knocked out in the first round of the singles tournament by her close friend and partner Peng Shuai, she and Chuang reached the quarterfinals in doubles, where they were beaten by the eventual silver medalists Andrea Hlaváčková and Lucie Hradecká.

Hsieh got off to a slow start to the summer hardcourt season. She played just one tournament between the Olympics and the US Open, the Texas Open. In singles, she was beaten by eventual champion Roberta Vinci in the first round, while falling in the quarterfinals of the doubles tournament with partner Gabriela Dabrowski to Iveta Benešová and Barbora Záhlavová-Strýcová. At the US Open, she suffered a three-set loss in singles to Magdaléna Rybáriková in the first round, but was successful in the women's doubles tournament with partner Anabel Medina Garrigues, where they reached the semifinals. Hsieh piled together a hugely successful Asian hardcourt season following the Open, winning 17 of her last 21 matches. She won the Ningbo Challenger, a $100k tournament, defeating Zhang Shuai in the final. The next week, she reached the final at the Guangzhou International Open dropping just one set en route. Facing the 17-year old Brit Laura Robson, the silver medalist in mixed doubles with Andy Murray at the 2012 Olympics who had defeated both four-time Grand Slam Champion Kim Clijsters and 2011 French Open champion Li Na, en route to the fourth round at the US Open less than a month earlier, Hsieh played the most intense tennis match of her life. Despite being 0–2 down in each of the first two sets, having five match points saved in the second set, the match being suspended after the second set due to the excruciatingly hot temperatures, and then being 0–3 down in the final set, she fought back to win the title in three sets. This marked Hsieh's second WTA Tour singles title of the year, and with it she jumped into the top 50 of the singles rankings for the first time, at No. 39. Though her 10-match winning streak was snapped in her very next match at the Pan Pacific Open, she won another $100k singles title two weeks later at the Suzhou Open, her 23rd career ITF singles title. This brought her into the top 25 for the first time, becoming the first Taiwanese tennis player to achieve a ranking that high. Hsieh concluded her season at the Tournament of Champions, where she was invited to compete for the first time. She lost her first two matches to Caroline Wozniacki and Vinci, but ended her year on a high note with a three-set victory over Hantuchová. Hsieh finished with her best year-end ranking to date, world No. 25 in singles, a ranking which she equaled in doubles.

=== 2013: Top 25 in singles, Wimbledon and Tour Championships doubles titles ===
Hsieh began the season at the inaugural Shenzhen Open, seeded fourth. She lost in the second round to Annika Beck. She then lost in the first round of the Hobart International to regular doubles partner Peng Shuai. At the Australian Open, Hsieh was seeded for the first time in a Grand Slam singles tournament. Seeded 26th, she won her first-round match against Lara Arruabarrena but lost in the second to two-time major champion Svetlana Kuznetsova. In doubles, Hsieh and Peng lost a tough match to top seeds Sara Errani and Roberta Vinci in the third round. In mixed doubles, Hsieh reached the quarterfinals with partner Rohan Bopanna, where they lost to Květa Peschke and Marcin Matkowski.

Hsieh entered the Pattaya Open but lost to Marina Erakovic in the first round. She then lost in the second round in Doha and Dubai. As the defending champion in Kuala Lumpur, Hsieh was seeded second and advanced to the quarterfinals with wins over Kurumi Nara and Zhang Shuai. However, she lost in the quarterfinals to eventual finalist Bethanie Mattek-Sands, and her ranking fell from No. 23 to No. 35. Hsieh then fell in the second round of the Indian Wells Open to American Jamie Hampton. However, she and Peng reached the semifinals of the doubles tournament, defeating the No. 1 ranked team of Sara Errani and Roberta Vinci in the second round. She was defeated in the second round of the singles tournament at the Miami Open, but was less successful in doubles this time around, falling in the second round to the wildcard pairing of Kuznetsova and Pennetta.

During the clay-court season, she fell in first round of the Madrid Open, Italian Open, and French Open and the second round of the Internationaux de Strasbourg in singles, but won the Italian Open with Peng, her tenth career doubles title. While Hsieh would struggle throughout the rest of the season on the singles court, winning five of her next eighteen matches, and her best results being second round showings at the next two major events, her Italian Open title sparked the beginning of what would go on to be a remarkable run of doubles titles and domination over the next twelve months. After a disappointing second-round loss at the French Open, and quarterfinal losses at both grass-court warm-up tournaments, Hsieh and Peng came into Wimbledon as the dark horse candidates for the title. Seeded eighth, the pair whizzed through to the final with the loss of just one set, and without having to face a single seeded team. Facing the 12th seeded Australian duo of Ashleigh Barty and Casey Dellacqua, they won the title in two sets. This was Hsieh's first Grand Slam title, making her the first Taiwanese tennis player to ever win one in any discipline. It also meant she would return to the top 10 rankings for the first time since January 2010.

Peng and Hsieh opened their summer hardcourt partnership with a victory at the Premier 5 Cincinnati Open, defeating Anna-Lena Grönefeld and Peschke in the final. After an opening-round loss in New Haven, and a defeat at the hands of Sania Mirza and Zheng Jie at the US Open, the pair won their fourth title of the year at the Guangzhou International Open and Tour Championships. After posting back-to-back semifinal finishes at the Pan Pacific Open and China Open, Hsieh qualified with Peng for the Tour Championships for the first time in her career. Seeded second, they defeated Nadia Petrova and Katarina Srebotnik in the semifinals and Ekaterina Makarova and Elena Vesnina in the final to win the year-ending championships, and their fifth title of 2013. By virtue of this win, Hsieh and Peng became the first Asian players to ever win a season-ending tennis championship. She finished her doubles season ranked No. 3 in the world, while her singles ranking dropped 60 places from 2012 down to No. 85.

Hsieh's singles season ended disappointing with numerous first-round losses and only five second round showings in Eastbourne International, Wimbledon, US Open, Guangzhou International and Luxembourg Open.

=== 2014: Singles slump, world No. 1 and French Open title in doubles ===
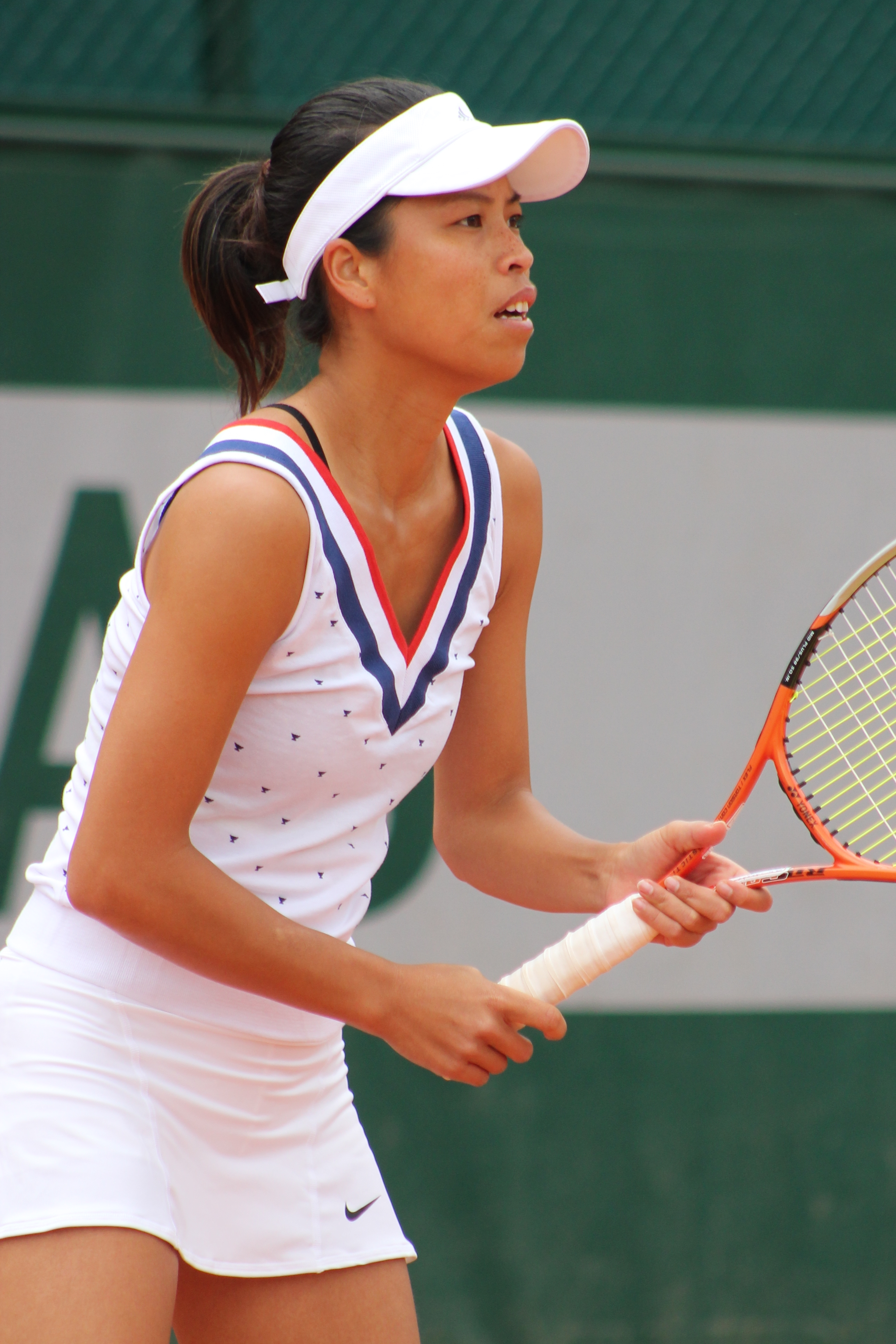
Hsieh, 2014

After training with her coach Paul McNamee in Australia, she started her season by playing in qualifying of Brisbane International and Sydney. She lost in qualifications for both tournaments but received a lucky-loser spot in Brisbane due to Caroline Wozniacki withdrawing late. She lost in round three to Carla Suárez Navarro. At Pattaya Open, Hsieh was defeated in the first round by Tadeja Majerič but won a week later in qualifying at the Qatar Open; in first round of the main draw, she also defeated Flavia Pennetta before losing to Sara Errani.

At Doha, Hsieh won her first doubles title with Peng Shuai in 2014 and reached a career-high of world No. 2 in doubles. Later in May, on the occasion of her semifinal run in doubles at the Madrid, Hsieh shared the No. 1 ranking with Peng for at least a week, becoming the first individual in Taiwan to hold the No. 1 ranking in tennis, whether in singles or doubles, male or female. However, she failed to defend her title with Peng in Italian Open by losing to Medina Garrigues and Shvedova in the second round in straight sets.

With doubles competition in the way, Hsieh missed all the singles events during the clay season except French Open, where she lost in the first round of qualifying. In doubles, she came through one of the more difficult doubles draws with Peng by defeating unseeded Svetlana Kuznetsova and Sam Stosur in the first round in straight sets, breezed through former No. 1, 15th seeds Liezel Huber and Lisa Raymond in the third round, grinded three sets with fifth seed Sania Mirza and Cara Black in the quarterfinals and Garbiñe Muguruza and Carla Suárez Navarro, whom they lost to in Madrid, in the semifinals and defeated second seed Errani and Vinci in the final in straight sets for their second Grand Slam title. They were unable to defend their title at Wimbledon though, falling in the third round to eventual runners-up Tímea Babos and Kristina Mladenovic despite winning the first set. They also lost in the third round at the US Open to the team of Kimiko Date-Krumm and Barbora Záhlavová-Strýcová. Their best result throughout the remainder of the year came at the WTA Finals in Singapore. They easily won their first two matches, but were thrashed in the final round by Cara Black and Sania Mirza, winning just one game. While Hsieh finished the year No. 144 in singles after a difficult year in which she won only seven main draw WTA Tour matches, she finished ranked No. 5 in the world for doubles, her second straight top five finish.

=== 2015: Consistent doubles results ===
At the Australian Open, Hsieh lost in the qualifying first round for singles, and main-draw second round for doubles, but she reached the semifinals in mixed doubles with Pablo Cuevas. Her best result in singles for the remainder of the year on the WTA Tour was reaching the semifinals in Kuala Lumpur. She only managed to compile three tour match wins afterward, defeating former world No. 15, Kaia Kanepi, to reach the second round at Wimbledon and a quarterfinal appearance at the Japan Open. On the ITF Circuit, however, she was more successful. In April, she won two 25k tournaments held back-to-back in Shenzhen and Nanning, the latter being her 25th ITF singles title. She later won a 100k tournament in Nanjing in November.

Hsieh still managed to put together a decent string of results on the doubles circuit. Partnering Sania Mirza, they reached the final at the Premier event in Doha before falling to the American duo of Raquel Kops-Jones and Abigail Spears. After the tournament in Doha, she started a new partnership with Flavia Pennetta. Despite getting off to a slow start with early exits in Indian Wells and Miami, the duo found more success during the clay-court season, reaching the quarterfinals in Madrid and Rome. Entering the French Open as a defending champion, Hsieh and Pennetta quickly progressed to the quarterfinals, but were undone in three sets by Hlaváčková and Hradecká. As a result of not defending her points, she dropped out of the top 10 for the first time in nearly two years. The two followed up with another quarterfinal appearance at Wimbledon, where they lost in three sets to Babos and Mladenovic, but dissolved their partnership following the grass-court season.

Entering the summer hardcourt season, Hsieh reunited with her friend Chuang Chia-jung, whom she would spend the majority of the rest of the season playing with. Their first tournament back was at the Cincinnati Open, where they reached the semifinals. En route, she was able to get revenge on Babos and Mladenovic, who had beaten her at Wimbledon, with a win over the pair in the quarterfinals. Hsieh decided to play with Anastasia Rodionova, though, instead of Chuang at the US Open. The pair, seeded tenth, were upset in the second round by Anna-Lena Grönefeld and CoCo Vandeweghe. She also played mixed doubles with Henri Kontinen, where they reached the quarterfinals. Hsieh played two more tournaments with Chuang, the inaugural Dongfeng Motor Open in Wuhan and in Beijing, but they lost both opening round matches. She finished the year ranked No. 107 in singles and No. 26 in doubles.

=== 2016: Unsatisfying results ===
The 2016 season was a relatively quiet one for Hsieh. While she finished the year ranked just inside the top 100 in singles, poor results in the middle of the year kept her from jumping beyond her peak year ranking of No. 65. Her best results on the WTA Tour came with a semifinal appearance in Taiwan, a quarterfinal showing in Prague, and progressing to the second round at the Australian and French Opens. Unlike the last few seasons, Hsieh played more singles matches on the ITF Circuit, reaching a 100k final in Marseille in June and winning a different 100k tournament in Dubai in December, her 27th ITF singles title.

Hsieh also struggled remarkably with doubles during the year, failing to make a single quarterfinal at tour-level. Her best result on tour came in a third round appearance at the Australian Open, also marking the first time since 2010, she failed to advance to the quarterfinals in at least one of the Grand Slam tournaments. As a result, she dropped down to playing primarily on the ITF Circuit for most of the season, where she managed to win the doubles title in Marseille, a 10k title in Porto, and finishing runner-up in the doubles draw in Dubai. While results managed to keep her inside the top 100, nonetheless, her year-end ranking of No. 96 marked her worst finish in ten years.

=== 2017: First top-10 singles win ===
While Hsieh continued to play a hefty chunk of ITF tournaments during the 2017 season, she also managed to post more respectable results on the WTA Tour. Though she only managed to improve her year-end singles ranking by one placement, up to No. 96, she had arguably her biggest singles breakout in over four years at the French Open. Ranked outside the top 100 going into the tournament, Hsieh pulled off the biggest win of her career by defeating reigning Miami Open champion and world No. 8, Johanna Konta, in the first round, her first ever singles victory over a top 10 player. She then defeated Taylor Townsend to advance to the third round for the first time at the French Open, and the first time at any Grand Slam since Wimbledon in 2012. She was defeated by hometown favorite Caroline Garcia in an intense three-set match, where the final set went to 9–7 in favor of Garcia. Hsieh also reached the final of the Hua Hin Championships, a WTA 125 event, in November, her biggest singles final in five years, but lost to former top-ten player Belinda Bencic.

After a difficult 2016, Hsieh also managed to recapture some of her strong doubles form. Partnering Oksana Kalashnikova, they won the Budapest Grand Prix in February, her 18th career doubles title, and her first since winning the French Open in 2014. Throughout the season, she played alongside a multitude of different female players, but found the most success working with Monica Niculescu. With the Romanian, they won inaugural version of the Swiss Ladies Open in April, reached the final of the Cincinnati Open, and reached the third round of the US Open. Additionally, she won a 100k doubles title in May at Cagnes-sur-Mer with Chang Kai-chen, her 23rd ITF doubles title, and the WTA 125 doubles title in Hawaii in November with her younger sister Hsieh Shu-ying. She finished the year ranked No. 32 in doubles, a very substantial improvement from the previous year.

=== 2018: Major singles success, third singles title ===
Hsieh opened the season by reaching the semifinals at the Auckland Open, her first WTA Tour singles semifinal since the Taiwan Open in February 2016. She lost to eventual champion Julia Görges. Hsieh's next tournament came at the Australian Open. After coming from behind to defeat Zhu Lin in her opening match, she caused the biggest upset of the tournament thus far by defeating the third seed and reigning Wimbledon champion, Garbiñe Muguruza, in straight sets. She continued this impressive display by taking out 26th seed and former world No. 2, Agnieszka Radwańska, in straight sets to reach the fourth round of a major event for the first time since she did so at the Australian Open ten years earlier. Facing Angelique Kerber, she won the first set, but was ultimately defeated by the German player. Hsieh also had a successful doubles tournament, reaching the semifinals with Peng Shuai, her best performance in a slam since they won the French Open. She returned to inside the top 75 of the singles rankings and the top 30 of the doubles rankings after the Australian Open.

After the Australian Open, Hsieh had a relatively quiet rest of the early hardcourt season singles-wise. After losing the qualifying rounds in Doha and Dubai, and a second-round loss at the Oracle Challenge, Hsieh qualified into the main draw at Indian Wells and progressed to the second round. Her best result came at the Miami Open where she advanced to the third round for the first time, losing to Karolína Plíšková. She had a very successful doubles performance, though, reaching the final in Dubai with Peng, and winning the Indian Wells title with Barbora Strýcová, her 20th career WTA doubles title. This victory put her back in the top 20 of the doubles rankings.

The clay-court season delivered mixed results for Hsieh. While she notched a couple of good singles placements, reaching the semifinals at the Morocco Open and the quarterfinals in Strasbourg, she didn't do as well in doubles, falling in the second round in Madrid and Rome, and the first round at the French Open for both singles and doubles.

Hsieh played two grass-court warm-up tournaments before Wimbledon. In Mallorca, she suffered two first-round losses, to Caroline Garcia in singles, and Anastasia Rodionova and Nadiia Kichenok in doubles, but fared better in Eastbourne with a third-round appearance in singles and the semifinals in doubles. Her singles performance was enough to push her ranking inside the top 50 for the first time since September 2013. Unseeded and placed in a very difficult top quarter, Hsieh opened up her Wimbledon campaign with a first round win over Anastasia Pavlyuchenkova, followed by a straight sets victory over Lara Arruabarrena to advance to the third round at Wimbledon for the first time in six years. She then recorded the biggest victory of her career by upsetting world No. 1, Simona Halep, who had just won the French Open four weeks earlier, in a tight three-setter where she came from a set down and saved match points, thus advancing to her second Grand Slam fourth round of the year, and her first-ever outside of the Australian Open. She lost her next match to Dominika Cibulková in straight sets. She didn't fare quite as well in doubles, losing in the third round. Nonetheless, her singles performance saw her return inside the top 40.

In the US Open Series, Hsieh played in the qualifying rounds for two tournaments, the Cincinnati Open and New Haven Open, but failed to qualify to the main draw in either. Despite a first-round doubles loss in Cincinnati, she reached the doubles final in New Haven with partner Laura Siegemund, but they were beaten by Andrea Sestini Hlaváčková and Strýcová. Hsieh next participated at the US Open, where she reached the second round in singles and the third round in doubles.

Hsieh continued her amazing comeback at her next tournament, the Japan Women's Open. Seeded second, she defeated Polona Hercog, Mandy Minella, Ajla Tomljanović, and Wang Qiang en route to the final. Facing 17-year old American Amanda Anisimova, one of the youngest players on tour, Hsieh defeated the young upstart in straight sets to win her third career singles title, and her first in six years. As a result of her victory, her singles ranking returned inside the top 30 since February 2013. At the Korea Open immediately after, Hsieh reached the semifinals in the singles tournament before falling to Tomljanović, and made the doubles final with her sister Hsieh Yu-chieh, but they fell to the all-Korean team of Choi Ji-hee and Han Na-lae. The remainder of Hsieh's results for the season were uneventful, except for another semifinal singles appearance at the Tianjin Open, where she was beaten again by Garcia. Thanks to her renaissance career year in singles, consistent results, and the withdrawals of a few higher-ranked players, Hsieh was invited to serve as the second alternate to the Elite Trophy, which she accepted, although she did not end up competing. She finished the year ranked No. 28 in singles, her best finish since 2012, and No. 17 in doubles.

=== 2019: Wimbledon doubles champion, consistent results all around ===
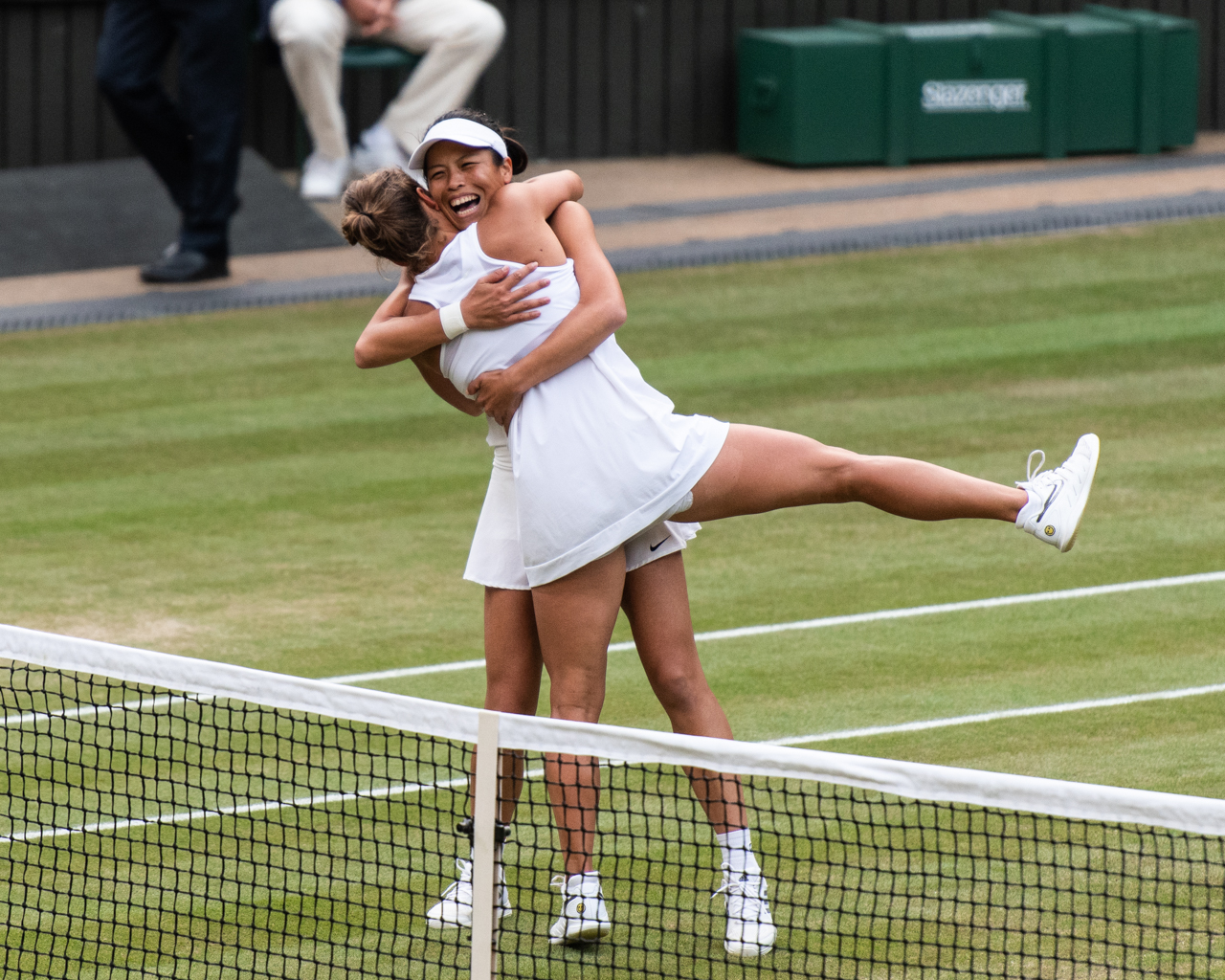
Hsieh and Strýcová hug after winning the women's doubles at the 2019 Wimbledon.

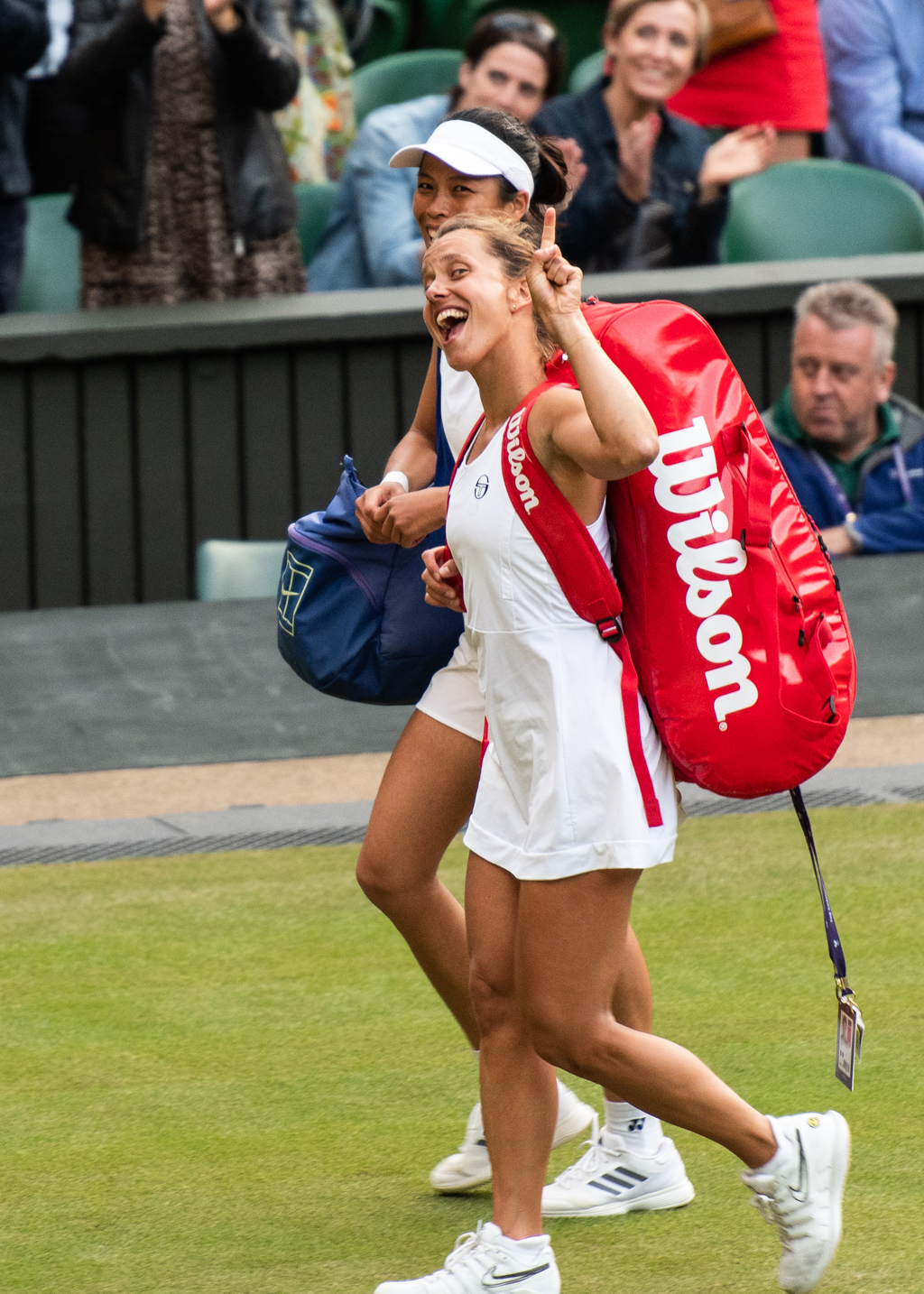
Hsieh and Strýcová, after winning in Wimbledon

Hsieh started the year strong with another semifinal run at the Auckland Open, where she fell to qualifier Bianca Andreescu, then a second-round loss in Sydney to Petra Kvitová. At the Australian Open, she was seeded 28th in the singles draw, her first seed in any Grand Slam tournament since 2013. After tallying easy wins over Stefanie Vögele and Laura Siegemund, she would succumb to world No. 4 and reigning US Open champion Naomi Osaka in the third round. Despite winning the first set and obtaining a 4–1 lead in the second, Osaka, who went on to win the tournament and claim the world No. 1 ranking, won eleven of the last 12 games to come back and claim the match. She teamed with Abigail Spears in the women's doubles tournament, where the pair was seeded eighth, but they were upset by eventual champions, Sam Stosur and Zhang Shuai, in the second round.

After early-round losses at the Thailand Open in singles and the Qatar Open in singles and doubles, Hsieh regained her form at the year's first Premier-5 event, the Dubai Championships. Unseeded in the singles draw, she breezed past tenth seed Anastasija Sevastova in the first round and Aliaksandra Sasnovich in the second round. She had a huge upset in the third round by defeating former world No. 1 and reigning Wimbledon champion, Angelique Kerber, in three sets. In the quarterfinals, she posted another comeback three-set win over the fourth seed Karolína Plíšková, winning the last six games in a row after being down 5-1 and on a nine-game losing streak in the final set to advance to her first Premier-5 semifinal. Facing Kvitová for the second time in two months, she was unable to get revenge on the Czech and lost in three sets despite winning the first. Hsieh also played doubles in Dubai, reuniting with Barbora Strýcová. Seeded third, the pair went on to win the title defeating Lucie Hradecká and Ekaterina Makarova in the final in two sets. She next played at Indian Wells, losing her only singles match to Johanna Konta and reaching the quarterfinals in doubles. Seeded 27th at the Miami Open, Hsieh defeated Alison Riske in her first match to set up a rematch with Osaka in the third round. This time, it was Hsieh who came back from both a set down and a service break down in the second and third sets to upend the Australian Open champion, her second victory over a world No. 1 in the last twelve months. She continued her great run by defeating former world No. 1 and 13th seed, Caroline Wozniacki, in the fourth round to advance to her first Premier Mandatory quarterfinal, where her tournament came to an end against the 21st-seeded Estonian Anett Kontaveit.

Hsieh had a quiet clay-court season in singles, her best result coming in Morocco where she reached the quarterfinals. However, she continued her doubles success with Strýcová as the pair won their second Premier Mandatory doubles title at the Madrid Open, defeating Gabriela Dabrowski and Xu Yifan in the final. She concluded her clay-court season at the French Open. Seeded 25th in singles, Hsieh was defeated by 2014 French Open semifinalist Andrea Petkovic in the second round. In doubles, she was seeded third with Strýcová, but they were upset in the third round by Lyudmyla Kichenok and Jeļena Ostapenko.

During the early grass-court season events, Hsieh and Strýcova won their third doubles title of the year at the Birmingham Classic. At Wimbledon, they reached their first major final as a pair by defeating Elise Mertens and Aryna Sabalenka, who won the Sunshine Double earlier that year, in the quarter- and the top seeded team of Babos and Mladenovic in the semifinals. They then defeated Dabrowski and Xu to win their first major together, without dropping a set. This gave Hsieh her second Wimbledon title, and third Grand Slam title overall. She also posted another solid result in singles, reaching the third round before falling to Plíšková.

During the summer hardcourt season, Hsieh struggled in both singles and doubles. Her best showings came in singles at the Washington Open, where she lost to young American Caty McNally in the quarterfinals, and the third round of the Premier 5 Cincinnati Open, losing to Osaka in three sets in the pairs third meeting of 2019. At the US Open, she lost to Wimbledon quarterfinalist Karolína Muchová in the second round in singles, while in doubles she and Strýcová were beaten in the third round by Kichenok and Ostapenko. Nonetheless, Hsieh and Strýcová became the first doubles team to qualify for the 2019 WTA Finals during the US Open.

Hsieh posted mixed results during the Asian hardcourt season for singles and doubles. Her best singles result came at the Japan Women's Open, where she was the defending champion and the number-one seed for the first time in a WTA Tour singles tournament in her career. However, she was upset by Nao Hibino in the quarterfinals. In doubles, she made the final of the Pan Pacific Open with her sister Hsieh Yu-chieh, where they were beaten by fellow-Taiwanese siblings Latisha Chan and Angel Chan. However, she and Strýcová came into the WTA Finals on a three-match losing streak after posting consecutive first-round losses in Wuhan and Beijing. Seeded second, the pair dropped their opening match to Dabrowski and Xu, but beat Barbora Krejčíková and Kateřina Siniaková, and Stosur and Zhang in their next two matches to finish first in the Purple Group. They defeated the No. 8 seeds, Anna-Lena Grönefeld and Demi Schuurs, in the semifinals, but were beaten by the defending champions, Babos and Mladenovic, in the final. Hsieh finished the year ranked No. 32 in singles and No. 4 in doubles, her first top 10 finish since 2014.

=== 2020: Back to No. 1 in doubles ===
Hsieh and Strýcová won the first tournament of the year at Brisbane. They followed that up with an appearance in the final at the Australian Open, where they lost to Babos and Mladenovic. Two more tournament victories followed in February: at Dubai and Doha. As a result, Hsieh regained her No. 1 doubles ranking for the first time since 6 July 2014. Her gap of five years, six months and 28 days between No. 1 doubles rankings is the second-longest in history, after Martina Hingis' gap of 15 years, nine months, and 30 days from March 2000 to January 2016.

=== 2021: First major singles quarterfinal, third Wimbledon and Indian Wells doubles titles ===
Hsieh began the year at the Abu Dhabi Open, where she partnered with Krejčíková, and was upset by Aoyama and Shibahara in the quarterfinals. After a first-round loss at the Melbourne Open, she entered the Australian Open in both singles and doubles, pairing again with Strýcová. While the veteran pair were upset in the second round by the unseeded team of Darija Jurak and Nina Stojanović, Hsieh defeated qualifier Tsvetana Pironkova, US Open champion Bianca Andreescu, and French Open finalists Sara Errani and Markéta Vondroušová to reach her first Grand Slam tournament quarterfinal in singles. At age 35, she became the oldest debutante at a major quarterfinal, where she lost to Naomi Osaka in straight sets.

At Wimbledon, Hsieh and Mertens won the doubles title for the third time, beating Veronika Kudermetova and Elena Vesnina in the final, after saving two championship points.

In Indian Wells, Hsieh and Mertens won the doubles title, defeating Kudermetova and Elena Rybakina in the final. It was Hsieh's third Indian Wells doubles title, each with a different partner, and her 12th WTA 1000 title overall. Following Indian Wells, she returned to No. 1 in doubles (since September 2021).

Hsieh and Mertens qualified for the WTA Finals in doubles. They reached the final, but lost to Krejčíková and Siniaková, in straight sets. Hsieh finished the year ranked world No. 3 in doubles.

Before the WTA Finals, she wrote on her Facebook page that she was taking an extended break after the Finals to heal an injury.

=== 2023: Return to the WTA Tour, second French Open title and fourth Wimbledon title ===
Hsieh made a return to the tour at the Madrid Open with partner Barbora Strýcová, using a protected ranking. The pair reached the quarterfinals before losing to Leylah Fernandez and Taylor Townsend, returning Hsieh to the WTA rankings at 355th in the world. She followed this with a round-one loss in Rome, again partnering with Strýcová, and a second-round loss in Strasbourg with Wang Xinyu.

In her fourth tournament back, she and Wang joined to play the French Open. The pair upset defending champion Kristina Mladenovic, who was playing with Zhang Shuai this year in the second round, then beat fifth seeds Desirae Krawczyk and Demi Schuurs in the third round. In the quarterfinals, they beat Veronika Kudermetova and Liudmila Samsonova to advance to the semifinals. There, they beat sixth seeds Nicole Melichar-Martinez and Ellen Perez to advance to their first final as a pair, and Hsieh's first final since her return to tennis. In the final, they came back from a one-set deficit to win the title, beating Fernandez and Townsend in three sets. This was Hsieh's second French Open doubles crown, her fifth Grand Slam title overall, and her 31st career doubles tournament win. After the tournament, Hsieh's ranking skyrocketed from 286th to No. 29 in the world.

On July 16, Hsieh won her fourth Wimbledon doubles title with Strýcová by defeating Storm Hunter and Elise Mertens in the final.

=== 2024: Singles retirement, mixed doubles & doubles champion in Australia, Wimbledon mixed doubles title ===
On December 31, 2023, Hsieh announced that the 2024 Australian Open would be her final Grand Slam tournament in singles, a career spanning more than two decades. While some expected Hsieh to be granted a main-draw wildcard for her final tournament, Australian Open organizers refused, and she was forced to play in qualifying. Hsieh's career in singles ended in the first round of qualifying, falling in straight sets to the No. 11 seed Anna Bondar.

At the same tournament, she reached for the first time a final in mixed doubles. With Jan Zieliński, she won her first mixed-doubles title defeating second seeds Desirae Krawczyk and Neal Skupski. They saved a championship point en route to Hsieh's seventh major title (and her first on hardcourts) and Zieliński's first. Zieliński became the first Polish champion and finalist at a mixed-doubles event. She also reached the final in doubles with former partner Elise Mertens, defeating third-seeded pair of current world No. 1, Storm Hunter, and former world No. 1 and defending champion, Katerina Siniaková. In the final, they defeated Jeļena Ostapenko and Lyudmyla Kichenok for her eighth major title.

In March, after announcing her retirement in singles at the majors, Hsieh participated in the singles qualifying competition at the WTA 1000 Indian Wells Open, using protected ranking. At the same tournament with Mertens, she won the doubles title for the fourth time, her 34th title overall, defeating former world No. 1 players, Hunter and Siniaková. She reached the mixed-doubles semifinals at the French Open with Zieliński where they lost to Desirae Krawczyk and Neal Skupski.

In June, Hsieh and Mertens won the Birmingham Classic, defeating Miyu Kato and Zhang Shuai in the final. At Wimbledon, she reached another final in mixed doubles with the same partner, Jan Zieliński. They won the title, defeating Mexican duo Giuliana Olmos and Santiago González in the final.

With Tsao Chia-yi, she reached the quarterfinals at the Paris Olympics, defeating Romanian duo Irina-Camelia Begu and Monica Niculescu and Ukrainians Marta Kostyuk and Dayana Yastremska. They lost to Czech pairing, Karolína Muchová and Linda Nosková.

With Elise Mertens, Hsieh qualified for the end-of-season WTA Finals but exited in the group stages after compiling a record of one win and two losses.

=== 2025: Australian and Wimbledon doubles finals ===
Partnering Jeļena Ostapenko, Hsieh reached the doubles final at the Australian Open, losing to top seeds Siniaková and Townsend in three sets. The pair also made the final of the Dubai Tennis Championships, losing to Siniaková and Townsend again. Hsieh then partnered up with Zhang Shuai at Indian Wells, but could not defend her title, as they lost in the semifinals to Olivia Nicholls and Tereza Mihalíková. Hsieh would continue to reach the latter stages of tournaments without managing to win a title, including the semifinals of the Madrid Open with Ostapenko, the semifinals of the Nottingham Open with Zhang, and the final of the Eastbourne Open with Australian Maya Joint.

Hsieh and Ostapenko entered Wimbledon as the fourth seeds, and sealed a place in the final with a win over Siniaková and Townsend, avenging her semifinal defeat against the pair at last year's event. Despite being down a set, it was Veronika Kudermetova and Elise Mertens who triumphed in the final. Hsieh then made the Canadian Open semifinals in her first appearance at the event in six years, partnering Olga Danilović.

Hsieh opted to partner with Ashlyn Krueger as opposed to Ostapenko for the US Open. They exited in the first round to 13th seeds Cristina Bucșa and Nicole Melichar-Martinez. Hsieh and Ostapenko rejoined for the China Open, where they made a run to the semifinals, before being eliminated by second-seeded Errani and Paolini, 6-4, 6-0.

At the Ningbo Open, Hsieh teamed up with Siniaková, the reigning world number one in doubles. They were upset in the semifinals by Melichar-Martinez and Samsonova.

Hsieh and Ostapenko were the sixth team to qualify for the WTA Finals, and were the only team to do so without winning a title. Despite this, they recorded a 3-0 record in group play, avenging their Wimbledon final defeat with a win over Kudermetova and Mertens, upsetting top seeds Errani and Paolini, and easing past eighth-seeded Asia Muhammad and Demi Schuurs. They could not capitalize on this momentum in the knockout rounds, as they were eliminated in the semifinals by Timea Babos and Luisa Stefani in straight sets.

Hsieh ended the year ranked ninth in doubles. She reached four finals, including two Grand Slam finals, but could not win any. She and Ostapenko decided to continue their partnership into 2026.

=== 2026 ===
Prior to the start of the season, Hsieh's longtime coach, Paul McNamee, announced the end of their partnership in order to coach fellow Australian Ellen Perez, ending a 14-year collaboration. Hsieh and Ostapenko then beat Perez and Bucsa in the final of the Brisbane International, their first title as a pair, 6-2, 6-1.

== Career statistics ==
Key
W	F	SF	QF	#R	RR	Q#	DNQ	A	NH

(W) winner; (F) finalist; (SF) semifinalist; (QF) quarterfinalist; (#R) rounds 4, 3, 2, 1; (RR) round-robin stage; (Q#) qualification round; (DNQ) did not qualify; (A) absent; (NH) not held; (SR) strike rate (events won / competed); (W–L) win–loss record.
To avoid confusion and double counting, these charts are updated at the conclusion of a tournament or when the player's participation has ended.

=== Grand Slam performance timelines ===
==== Singles ====
Tournament	2002	2003	2004	2005	2006	2007	2008	2009	2010	2011	2012	2013	2014	2015	2016	2017	2018	2019	2020	2021	2022	2023	2024	SR	W–L	Win %
Australian Open	Q2	A	A	A	Q3	Q2	4R	1R	A	A	Q2	2R	1R	Q1	2R	2R	4R	3R	1R	QF	A	A	Q1	0 / 10	15–10	60%
French Open	Q3	A	A	A	1R	1R	1R	Q1	A	A	1R	1R	Q1	Q1	2R	3R	1R	2R	2R	1R	A	A	A	0 / 11	5–11	31%
Wimbledon	Q2	A	A	A0	1R	1R	2R	A	A	A	3R	2R	1R	2R	1R	1R	4R	3R	NH	1R	A	Q3	A	0 / 12	10–12	45%
US Open	Q1	A	A	1R	Q3	Q3	2R	Q1	A	A	1R	2R	Q1	Q2	1R	Q3	2R	2R	A	2R	A	A	A	0 / 8	5–8	38%
Win–loss	0–0	0–0	0–0	0–1	0–2	0–2	5–4	0–1	0–0	0–0	2–3	3–4	0–2	1–1	2–4	3–3	7–4	6–4	1–2	5–4	0–0	0–0	0-0	0 / 41	35–41	46%

==== Doubles ====
Tournament	2004	2005	2006	2007	2008	2009	2010	2011	2012	2013	2014	2015	2016	2017	2018	2019	2020	2021	2022	2023	2024	2025	2026	SR	W–L	Win %
Australian Open	A	1R	2R	1R	2R	QF	3R	QF	2R	3R	2R	2R	3R	A	SF	2R	F	2R	A	A	W	F	QF	1 / 19	42–18	70%
French Open	A	A	A	2R	1R	SF	1R	1R	2R	2R	W	QF	1R	2R	1R	3R	3R	3R	A	W	2R	2R	2R	2 / 18	31–16	66%
Wimbledon	A	A	1R	1R	1R	1R	3R	1R	3R	W	3R	QF	1R	1R	3R	W	NH	W	A	W	SF	F	3R	4 / 18	41–14	75%
US Open	A	A	A	1R	1R	2R	2R	3R	SF	QF	3R	2R	A	3R	3R	3R	A	QF	A	SF	1R	1R	QF	0 / 17	30–17	64%
Win–loss	0–0	0–1	1–2	1–4	1–4	8–4	5–4	5–4	8–4	12–3	11–3	8–4	2–3	3–3	8–4	11–3	7–2	12–3	—	16–1	11–3	11–4	9–4	7 / 72	146–65	69%

=== Grand Slam tournaments ===
==== Doubles: 10 (7 titles, 3 runner-ups) ====
Result	Year	Tournament	Surface	Partner	Opponents	Score
Win	2013	Wimbledon	Grass	(China) Peng Shuai	(Australia) Ashleigh Barty (Australia) Casey Dellacqua	7–6^{(7–1)}, 6–1
Win	2014	French Open	Clay	(China) Peng Shuai	(Italy) Sara Errani (Italy) Roberta Vinci	6–4, 6–1
Win	2019	Wimbledon (2)	Grass	(Czech Republic) Barbora Strýcová	(Canada) Gabriela Dabrowski (China) Xu Yifan	6–2, 6–4
Loss	2020	Australian Open	Hard	(Czech Republic) Barbora Strýcová	(Hungary) Tímea Babos (France) Kristina Mladenovic	2–6, 1–6
Win	2021	Wimbledon (3)	Grass	(Belgium) Elise Mertens	(Russia) Veronika Kudermetova (Russia) Elena Vesnina	3–6, 7–5, 9–7
Win	2023	French Open (2)	Clay	(China) Wang Xinyu	(Canada) Leylah Fernandez (United States) Taylor Townsend	1–6, 7–6^{(7–5)}, 6–1
Win	2023	Wimbledon (4)	Grass	(Czech Republic) Barbora Strýcová	(Australia) Storm Hunter (Belgium) Elise Mertens	7–5, 6–4
Win	2024	Australian Open	Hard	(Belgium) Elise Mertens	(Ukraine) Lyudmyla Kichenok (Latvia) Jeļena Ostapenko	6–1, 7–5
Loss	2025	Australian Open	Hard	(Latvia) Jeļena Ostapenko	(Czech Republic) Kateřina Siniaková (United States) Taylor Townsend	2–6, 7–6^{(7–4)}, 3–6
Loss	2025	Wimbledon	Grass	(Latvia) Jeļena Ostapenko	Veronika Kudermetova (Belgium) Elise Mertens	6–3, 2–6, 4–6

==== Mixed doubles: 2 (2 titles) ====
Result	Year	Tournament	Surface	Partner	Opponents	Score
Win	2024	Australian Open	Hard	(Poland) Jan Zieliński	(United States) Desirae Krawczyk (United Kingdom) Neal Skupski	6–7^{(5–7)}, 6–4, [11–9]
Win	2024	Wimbledon	Grass	(Poland) Jan Zieliński	(Mexico) Giuliana Olmos (Mexico) Santiago González	6–4, 6–2

=== Year-end championships ===
==== Doubles: 4 (1 title, 3 runner-ups) ====
Result	Year	Tournament	Surface	Partner	Opponents	Score
Win	2013	WTA Finals, Turkiye	Hard (i)	(China) Peng Shuai	(Russia) Ekaterina Makarova (Russia) Elena Vesnina	6–4, 7–5
Loss	2014	WTA Finals, Singapore	Hard (i)	(China) Peng Shuai	(Zimbabwe) Cara Black (India) Sania Mirza	1–6, 0–6
Loss	2019	WTA Finals, China	Hard (i)	(Czech Republic) Barbora Strýcová	(Hungary) Tímea Babos (France) Kristina Mladenovic	1–6, 3–6
Loss	2021	WTA Finals, Mexico	Hard	(Belgium) Elise Mertens	(Czech Republic) Barbora Krejčíková (Czech Republic) Kateřina Siniaková	3–6, 4–6
