= Lim Yong-kyu =

South Korean tennis player

- Native name: 임용규
- Country (sports): South Korea
- Residence: Seoul, South Korea
- Born: June 18, 1991 (age 34) Andong, South Korea
- Height: 185 cm (6 ft 1 in)
- Retired: 2019 (last match played)
- Plays: Right-handed
- Prize money: $123,309

Singles
- Career record: 12–8
- Career titles: 0
- Highest ranking: No. 257 (12 May 2014)

Grand Slam singles results
- Australian Open Junior: 1R (2007)
- Wimbledon Junior: Q1 (2007)
- US Open Junior: 2R (2009)

Doubles
- Career record: 4–4
- Career titles: 0
- Highest ranking: No. 212 (12 May 2014)

Grand Slam doubles results
- Australian Open Junior: SF (2007)
- US Open Junior: 1R (2009)
Medal record
Representing South Korea
Men's tennis
Asian Games
Gold medal – first place	2014 Incheon	Doubles
- Last updated on: 3 July 2017.

- Lim Yong-kyu
- Hangul: 임용규
- RR: Im Yonggyu
- MR: Im Yonggyu

Lim Yong-kyu (born June 18, 1991) is a South Korean former professional tennis player. He has won 1 ATP Challenger Tour singles title, the 2010 Busan Open Challenger Tennis. Lim has also won 12 ITF Futures singles titles and 14 ITF doubles titles.
