= Cho Min-hyeok =

South Korean tennis player

Cho Min-hyeok 조민혁
- Country (sports): South Korea
- Residence: Seoul, South Korea
- Born: 17 January 1987 (age 38) Seoul, South Korea
- Plays: Right-handed (two-handed backhand)
- Prize money: $28,949

Singles
- Career record: 2–4 (at ATP Tour level, Grand Slam level, and in Davis Cup)
- Career titles: 0
- Highest ranking: No. 536 (22 August 2016)

Doubles
- Career record: 0–0 (at ATP Tour level, Grand Slam level, and in Davis Cup)
- Career titles: 0
- Highest ranking: No. 820 (3 November 2014)

Team competitions
- Davis Cup: 2–4

- Cho Min-hyeok
- Hangul: 조민혁
- RR: Jo Minhyeok
- MR: Cho Minhyŏk

Cho Min-hyeok (born 17 January 1987) is a South Korean tennis player.

Cho has a career high ATP singles ranking of No. 536 achieved on 22 August 2016 and a career high ATP doubles ranking of No. 820 achieved on 3 November 2014. Cho has won two ITF singles titles and two ITF doubles titles.

Cho has represented South Korea at the Davis Cup, where he has a win–loss record of 2–4.
