= Wong Chun-hun =

Hong Kong tennis player

Wong Chun-hun 黄俊鏗
- Country (sports): Hong Kong
- Residence: Hong Kong
- Born: 30 October 1995 (age 30) Hong Kong
- Plays: Right-handed (two-handed backhand)
- College: University of Michigan
- Prize money: $13,153

Singles
- Career record: 0–2 (at ATP Tour level, Grand Slam level, and in Davis Cup)
- Career titles: 0
- Highest ranking: No. 965 (21 May 2018)

Doubles
- Career record: 7–1 (at ATP Tour level, Grand Slam level, and in Davis Cup)
- Career titles: 0
- Highest ranking: No. 393 (25 October 2018)

Team competitions
- Davis Cup: 7–3

Wong Chun-hun (Chinese: 黄俊鏗; born 30 October 1995; also known as Kevin Wong) is a Hong Kong tennis player.

Wong has a career high ATP singles ranking of No. 965 achieved on 21 May 2018 and a career high ATP doubles ranking of No. 393 achieved on 25 October 2018.

Wong has represented Hong Kong at the Davis Cup, where he has a win–loss record of 7–3.
