= China at the 2018 Asian Games =

- IOC code: CHN
- NOC: Chinese Olympic Committee external link (in Chinese and English)

in Jakarta and Palembang August 18 – September 2
- Competitors: 845 in 38 sports
- Flag bearers: Zhao Shuai (opening); Guo Dan (closing)
- Medals Ranked 1st: Gold 132 Silver 92 Bronze 65 Total 289

Asian Games appearances (overview)
- 1974; 1978; 1982; 1986; 1990; 1994; 1998; 2002; 2006; 2010; 2014; 2018; 2022; 2026

The People's Republic of China competed at the 2018 Asian Games in Jakarta and Palembang, Indonesia, from 18 August to 2 September 2018. China won 289 medals (132 gold, 92 silver and 65 bronze), leading the medal count for the tenth time in Asian Games history.

With Hangzhou hosting the 2022 Asian Games, a Chinese segment was performed at the closing ceremony.

== Medalists ==
Medals by sport
| Sport | 1st place, gold medalist(s) | 2nd place, silver medalist(s) | 3rd place, bronze medalist(s) | Total |
| Swimming | 19 | 17 | 14 | 50 |
| Athletics | 12 | 12 | 9 | 33 |
| Canoeing | 12 | 5 | 0 | 17 |
| Gymnastics | 10 | 6 | 7 | 23 |
| Diving | 10 | 6 | 0 | 15 |
| Wushu | 10 | 2 | 0 | 12 |
| Rowing | 9 | 1 | 0 | 10 |
| Shooting | 8 | 5 | 2 | 15 |
| Cycling | 6 | 5 | 2 | 13 |
| Table tennis | 5 | 3 | 0 | 8 |
| Basketball | 4 | 0 | 0 | 4 |
| Fencing | 3 | 6 | 2 | 11 |
| Sailing | 3 | 4 | 0 | 7 |
| Badminton | 3 | 1 | 2 | 6 |
| Contract bridge | 3 | 1 | 2 | 6 |
| Wrestling | 2 | 3 | 1 | 6 |
| Tennis | 2 | 2 | 0 | 4 |
| Boxing | 2 | 0 | 3 | 5 |
| Artistic swimming | 2 | 0 | 0 | 2 |
| Volleyball | 2 | 0 | 0 | 2 |
| Taekwondo | 1 | 2 | 2 | 5 |
| Karate | 1 | 2 | 0 | 3 |
| Archery | 1 | 0 | 2 | 3 |
| Modern pentathlon | 1 | 0 | 1 | 2 |
| Water polo | 1 | 0 | 0 | 1 |
| Sport climbing | 0 | 2 | 3 | 5 |
| Golf | 0 | 2 | 2 | 4 |
| Roller sports | 0 | 1 | 1 | 2 |
| Triathlon | 0 | 1 | 1 | 2 |
| Football | 0 | 1 | 0 | 1 |
| Handball | 0 | 1 | 0 | 1 |
| Rugby sevens | 0 | 1 | 0 | 1 |
| Judo | 0 | 0 | 4 | 4 |
| Soft tennis | 0 | 0 | 2 | 2 |
| Equestrian | 0 | 0 | 1 | 1 |
| Field hockey | 0 | 0 | 1 | 1 |
| Softball | 0 | 0 | 1 | 1 |
| Total | 132 | 92 | 65 | 289 |

Medals by day
| Day | Date | 1st place, gold medalist(s) | 2nd place, silver medalist(s) | 3rd place, bronze medalist(s) | Total |
| 1 | August 19 | 7 | 5 | 4 | 16 |
| 2 | August 20 | 8 | 7 | 5 | 20 |
| 3 | August 21 | 15 | 6 | 3 | 24 |
| 4 | August 22 | 8 | 12 | 3 | 23 |
| 5 | August 23 | 17 | 10 | 6 | 33 |
| 6 | August 24 | 11 | 6 | 6 | 23 |
| 7 | August 25 | 6 | 5 | 3 | 14 |
| 8 | August 26 | 6 | 8 | 7 | 21 |
| 9 | August 27 | 8 | 3 | 6 | 17 |
| 10 | August 28 | 11 | 2 | 2 | 15 |
| 11 | August 29 | 5 | 3 | 5 | 13 |
| 12 | August 30 | 10 | 9 | 3 | 22 |
| 13 | August 31 | 6 | 9 | 7 | 22 |
| 14 | September 1 | 14 | 7 | 5 | 26 |
| 15 | September 2 | 0 | 0 | 0 | 0 |
| Total | | 132 | 92 | 65 | 289 |

Medals by gender
| Gender | 1st place, gold medalist(s) | 2nd place, silver medalist(s) | 3rd place, bronze medalist(s) | Total | Percentage |
| Male | 68 | 39 | 34 | 141 | 60,5% |
| Female | 43 | 37 | 17 | 97 | 38% |
| Mixed | 3 | 1 | 2 | 6 | 1,5% |
| Total | 112 | 76 | 53 | 241 | 100% |

The following China competitors won medals at the Games.

| Medal | Name | Sport | Event | Date |
|---|---|---|---|---|
| Gold | Sun Peiyuan | Wushu | Men's changquan | August 19 |
| Gold | Ji Xiaojing; Wu Jiayu | Shooting | Mixed 10 metre air pistol team | August 19 |
| Gold | Wang Jianjiahe | Swimming | Women's 1500 metre freestyle | August 19 |
| Gold | Sun Yang | Swimming | Men's 200 metre freestyle | August 19 |
| Gold | Liu Yaxin | Swimming | Women's 200 metre backstroke | August 19 |
| Gold | Xu Jiayu | Swimming | Men's 100 metre backstroke | August 19 |
| Gold | Qian Jiarui | Fencing | Women's individual sabre | August 19 |
| Gold | Tang Lu | Wushu | Women's nanquan | August 20 |
| Gold | Yang Haoran | Shooting | Men's 10 metre air rifle | August 20 |
| Gold | Zhao Ruozhu | Shooting | Women's 10 metre air rifle | August 20 |
| Gold | Zhang Xinqu | Shooting | Women's trap | August 20 |
| Gold | Sun Yang | Swimming | Men's 800 metre freestyle | August 20 |
| Gold | Xu Jiayu | Swimming | Men's 50 metre backstroke | August 20 |
| Gold | Wang Shun | Swimming | Men's 200 metre individual medley | August 20 |
| Gold | Lin Chaopan | Gymnastics | Men's artistic individual all-around | August 20 |
| Gold | Wu Zhaohua | Wushu | Men's daoshu and gunshu | August 21 |
| Gold | Guo Mengjiao | Wushu | Women's jianshu and qiangshu | August 21 |
| Gold | Yao Bianwa | Cycling | Women's cross-country | August 21 |
| Gold | Ma Hao | Cycling | Men's cross-country | August 21 |
| Gold | Hui Zicheng | Shooting | Men's 50 metre rifle three positions | August 21 |
| Gold | China women's national water polo team: Peng Lin; Zhai Ying; Mei Xiaohan; Xiong Dunhan; Niu Guannan; Guo Ning; Nong Sanfeng; Zhang Cong; Wang Huan; Zhang Danyi; Chen Xiao; Zhang Jing; Shen Yineng | Waterpolo | Women's tournament | August 21 |
| Gold | Luo Zongshi | Taekwondo | Women's 57 kg | August 21 |
| Gold | Liu Xiang | Swimming | Women's 50 metre backstroke | August 21 |
| Gold | Yu Hexin | Swimming | Men's 50 metre freestyle | August 21 |
| Gold | Sun Yang | Swimming | Men's 400 metre freestyle | August 21 |
| Gold | Zhou Feng | Wrestling | Women's freestyle 68 kg | August 21 |
| Gold | Zhou Qian | Wrestling | Women's freestyle 76 kg | August 21 |
| Gold | Li Bingjie; Wang Jianjiahe; Zhang Yuhan; Yang Junxuan; Shen Duo; Ai Yanhan; Wu Yue | Swimming | Women's 4 × 200 metre freestyle relay | August 21 |
| Gold | Huang Mengkai | Fencing | Men's individual foil | August 21 |
| Gold | Chen Yile | Gymnastics | Women's artistic individual all-around | August 21 |
| Gold | Chen Zhouli | Wushu | Men's taijiquan | August 22 |
| Gold | Qi Xinyi | Wushu | Women's changquan | August 22 |
| Gold | Deng Shudi; Lin Chaopan; Sun Wei; Xiao Ruoteng; Zou Jingyuan | Gymnastics | Men's artistic team all-around | August 22 |
| Gold | Li Bingjie | Swimming | Women's 200 metre freestyle | August 22 |
| Gold | Zhang Yufei | Swimming | Women's 200 metre butterfly | August 22 |
| Gold | Xu Jiayu; Yan Zibei; Zhang Yufei; Zhu Menghui; Li Guangyuan; Shi Jinglin; Zheng Xiaojing; Yang Junxuan | Swimming | Mixed 4 × 100 metre medley relay | August 22 |
| Gold | Chen Yile; Liu Jinru; Liu Tingting; Luo Huan; Zhang Jin | Gymnastics | Women's artistic team all-around | August 22 |
| Gold | Chen Long; Li Junhui; Lin Dan; Liu Cheng; Liu Yuchen; Qiao Bin; Shi Yuqi; Wang Yilyu; Zhang Nan; Zheng Siwei | Badminton | Men's team | August 22 |
| Gold | Zhang Liang | Rowing | Men's single sculls | August 23 |
| Gold | Chen Yunxia | Rowing | Women's single sculls | August 23 |
| Gold | Ju Rui; Lin Xinyu | Rowing | Women's pair | August 23 |
| Gold | Li Yueyao | Wushu | Women's sanda 52 kg | August 23 |
| Gold | Jiang Yan; Li Jingjing | Rowing | Women's double sculls | August 23 |
| Gold | Cai Yingying | Wushu | Women's sanda 60 kg | August 23 |
| Gold | Li Xiaoxiong; Zhao Jingbin | Rowing | Men's pair | August 23 |
| Gold | Lü Fanpu; Xiong Xiong; Zhao Chao; Zhou Xuewu | Rowing | Men's lightweight four | August 23 |
| Gold | Chen Shi | Canoeing | Women's slalom C-1 | August 23 |
| Gold | Quan Xin | Canoeing | Men's slalom K-1 | August 23 |
| Gold | Shen Guoshun | Wushu | Men's sanda 56 kg | August 23 |
| Gold | Li Mengfan | Wushu | Men's sanda 65 kg | August 23 |
| Gold | Li Qingnian | Shooting | Women's double trap | August 23 |
| Gold | Liu Tingting | Gymnastics | Women's uneven bars | August 23 |
| Gold | Wang Jianjiahe | Swimming | Women's 800 metre freestyle | August 23 |
| Gold | Deng Shudi | Gymnastics | Men's rings | August 23 |
| Gold | Xu Jiayu | Swimming | Men's 200 metre backstroke | August 23 |
| Gold | Pan Dandan | Rowing | Women's lightweight single sculls | August 24 |
| Gold | Liang Guoru; Wu Qiang | Rowing | Women's lightweight double sculls | August 24 |
| Gold | Yi Qilin; Guo Linlin; Zhang Min; Wang Fei | Rowing | Women's four | August 24 |
| Gold | Wang Qiang | Tennis | Women's singles | August 24 |
| Gold | Wang Qian | Shooting | Women's 10 metre air pistol | August 24 |
| Gold | Chen Yile | Gymnastics | Women's balance beam | August 24 |
| Gold | Zou Jingyuan | Gymnastics | Men's parallel bars | August 24 |
| Gold | Wang Jianjiahe | Swimming | Women's 400 metre freestyle | August 24 |
| Gold | Lin Sheng; Sun Yiwen; Xu Chengzi; Zhu Mingye | Fencing | Women's team épée | August 24 |
| Gold | Sun Yang | Swimming | Men's 1500 metre freestyle | August 24 |
| Gold | Xu Jiayu; Yan Zibei; Li Zhuhao; Yu Hexin; Li Guangyuan; Qin Haiyang; Zheng Xiaojing; He Junyi | Swimming | Men's 4 × 100 metre medley relay | August 24 |
| Gold | Xu Yifan; Yang Zhaoxuan | Tennis | Women's doubles | August 25 |
| Gold | Zhang Yaru | Cycling | Women's BMX race | August 25 |
| Gold | Wang Li; Xu Fengxue; Zhong Yuan; Chen Xue; Tang Shenglan; Song Yanbing; Liang Liping; Huang Yi; Wang Jing; Chen Chen; Dong Aili; Peng Xiaojuan | Canoeing | Women's TBR-12 200 metres | August 25 |
| Gold | Du Zhuan; Yin Zhonghai; Zhang Zhen; Zeng Delin; Chen Guangqin; Su Bopin; Li Shuai; Chen Juntong; Liu Xuegang; Cai Wenxuan; Gao Jiawen; Jiao Fangxu | Canoeing | Men's TBR-12 200 metres | August 25 |
| Gold | Yao Zhaonan | Shooting | Men's 25 metre rapid fire pistol | August 25 |
| Gold | Luo Na | Athletics | Women's hammer throw | August 25 |
| Gold | Yin Xiaoyan | Karate | Women's 61 kg | August 26 |
| Gold | Gong Lijiao | Athletics | Women's shot put | August 26 |
| Gold | Wang Jianan | Athletics | Men's long jump | August 26 |
| Gold | Li Yingyun; Jiang Jiayin; Dilana Dilixiati; Zhang Zhiting | Basketball | Women's 3-on-3 tournament | August 26 |
| Gold | Chen Gong; Xiao Hailing; Huang Wenwei; Zeng Bingqiang | Basketball | Men's 3-on-3 tournament | August 26 |
| Gold | Su Bingtian | Athletics | Men's 100 metres | August 26 |
| Gold | Li Jianxin; Xu Chao; Zhou Yu | Cycling | Men's team sprint | August 27 |
| Gold | Lin Junhong; Zhong Tianshi | Cycling | Women's team sprint | August 27 |
| Gold | Wang Fan; Xia Xinyi | Beach volleyball | Women's tournament | August 27 |
| Gold | Hu Wen; Yang Jinghui; Zhu Aiping; Li Liang; Xun Yonghong; Zhang Yizhuo | Bridge | Mixed team | August 27 |
| Gold | Shen Qi; Wang Wenfei; Liu Jing; Hou Xu; Fu Zhong; Li Jie | Bridge | Supermixed team | August 27 |
| Gold | Zheng Siwei; Huang Yaqiong | Badminton | Mixed doubles | August 27 |
| Gold | Chen Qingchen; Jia Yifan | Badminton | Women's doubles | August 27 |
| Gold | Wang Yu | Athletics | Men's high jump | August 27 |
| Gold | Zhang Xinyan | Archery | Women's individual recurve | August 28 |
| Gold | Jiang Wenwen; Jiang Tingting | Artistic swimming | Women's duet | August 28 |
| Gold | Guo Liang; Qin Chenlu; Shen Ping'an; Xue Chaohua | Cycling | Men's team pursuit | August 28 |
| Gold | Chen Meng; Chen Xingtong; Sun Yingsha; Wang Manyu; Zhu Yuling | Table tennis | Women's team | August 28 |
| Gold | Xie Wenjun | Athletics | Men's 110 metres hurdles | August 28 |
| Gold | Zhang Minjie; Zhang Jiaqi | Diving | Women's synchronized 10 metre platform | August 28 |
| Gold | Wang Chunyu | Athletics | Women's 800 metres | August 28 |
| Gold | Li Ling | Athletics | Women's pole vault | August 28 |
| Gold | Fan Zhendong; Liang Jingkun; Lin Gaoyuan; Wang Chuqin; Xue Fei | Table tennis | Men's team | August 28 |
| Gold | Liu Shiying | Athletics | Women's javelin throw | August 28 |
| Gold | Cao Yuan; Xie Siyi | Diving | Men's synchronized 3 metre springboard | August 28 |
| Gold | Wang Kaihua | Athletics | Men's 20 kilometres walk | August 29 |
| Gold | Yang Jiayu | Athletics | Women's 20 kilometres walk | August 29 |
| Gold | Chang Hao; Feng Yu; Guo Li; Liang Xinping; Wang Liuyi; Wang Qianyi; Xiao Yanning; Yin Chengxin | Artistic swimming | Women's team | August 29 |
| Gold | Chang Yani; Shi Tingmao | Diving | Women's synchronized 3 metre springboard | August 29 |
| Gold | Cao Yuan; Xie Siyi | Diving | Men's synchronized 3 metre springboard | August 29 |
| Gold | Ma Yanan; Sun Mengya | Canoeing | Women's C-2 500 metres | August 30 |
| Gold | Li Yue | Canoeing | Women's K-1 500 metres | August 30 |
| Gold | Zhang Dong; Bu Tingkai | Canoeing | Men's K-2 1000 metres | August 30 |
| Gold | Liu Hao; Wang Hao | Canoeing | Men's C-2 1000 metres | August 30 |
| Gold | Liu Lingling | Gymnastics | Women's trampoline | August 30 |
| Gold | Dong Dong | Gymnastics | Men's trampoline | August 30 |
| Gold | Chen Yang | Athletics | Women's discus throw | August 30 |
| Gold | Si Yajie | Diving | Women's 10 metre platform | August 30 |
| Gold | Wang Chuqin; Sun Yingsha | Table tennis | Mixed doubles | August 30 |
| Gold | Peng Jianfeng | Diving | Men's 1 metre springboard | August 30 |
| Gold | Bi Kun | Sailing | Men's RS:X | August 31 |
| Gold | Chen Peina | Sailing | Women's RS:X | August 31 |
| Gold | Chen Hao; Tan Yue | Sailing | Mixed RS One | August 31 |
| Gold | Zhang Mingyu | Modern pentathlon | Women's individual | August 31 |
| Gold | Wang Han | Diving | Women's 1 metre springboard | August 31 |
| Gold | Xie Siyi | Diving | Men's 3 metre springboard | August 31 |
| Gold | Sun Mengya | Canoeing | Women's C-1 200 metres | September 1 |
| Gold | Li Qiang; Xing Song | Canoeing | Men's C-2 200 metres | September 1 |
| Gold | Li Yue; Zhou Yu | Canoeing | Women's K-2 500 metres | September 1 |
| Gold | Huang Jieyi; Ma Qing; Yang Jiali; Zhou Yu | Canoeing | Women's K-4 500 metres | September 1 |
| Gold | Ran Jingrong; Wu Shaohong | Bridge | Women's pair | September 1 |
| Gold | Chang Yuan | Boxing | Women's 51 kg | September 1 |
| Gold | Wang Manyu | Table tennis | Women's singles | September 1 |
| Gold | Yin Junhua | Boxing | Women's 57 kg | September 1 |
| Gold | China women's national basketball team: Li Yuan; Wang Siyu; Wang Lili; Shao Ting; Li Meng; Wang Xuemeng; Huang Sijing; Liu Jiacen; Sun Mengran; Li Yueru; Han Xu | Basketball | Women's 5-on-5 tournament | September 1 |
| Gold | China women's national volleyball team: Yuan Xinyue; Zhu Ting; Gong Xiangyu; Zeng Chunlei; Liu Xiaotong; Yao Di; Li Yingying; Diao Linyu; Lin Li; Ding Xia; Yan Ni; Wang Mengjie; Duan Fang; Hu Mingyuan | Volleyball | Women's tournament | September 1 |
| Gold | Fan Zhendong | Table tennis | Men's singles | September 1 |
| Gold | Shi Tingmao | Diving | Women's 3 metre springboard | September 1 |
| Gold | China men's national basketball team: Tian Yuxiang; Fang Shuo; Zhao Tailong; Yu Changdong; Ding Yanyuhang; Zhao Rui; Liu Zhixuan; Zhou Qi; Dong Hanlin; Sun Minghui; Abudushalamu Abudurexiti; Wang Zhelin | Basketball | Men's 5-on-5 tournament | September 1 |
| Gold | Yang Jian | Diving | Men's 10 metre platform | September 1 |
| Silver | Zhao Ruozhu; Yang Haoran | Shooting | Mixed 10 metre air rifle team | August 19 |
| Silver | Deng Tingfeng; Hu Mingda; Zhu Yuxiang | Taekwondo | Men's team poomsae | August 19 |
| Silver | Li Bingjie | Swimming | Women's 1500 metre freestyle | August 19 |
| Silver | Shao Yaqi | Fencing | Women's individual sabre | August 19 |
| Silver | Zhu Menghui; Wu Yue; Wu Qingfeng; Yang Junxuan; Wang Jingzhuo; Lao Lihui; Liu Xiaohan | Swimming | Women's 4 × 100 metre freestyle relay | August 19 |
| Silver | Wang Yichun | Swimming | Women's 50 metre butterfly | August 20 |
| Silver | Zhu Menghui | Swimming | Women's 100 metre freestyle | August 20 |
| Silver | Yu Jingyao | Swimming | Women's 200 metre breaststroke | August 20 |
| Silver | Ji Xinjie; Shang Keyuan; Wang Shun; Sun Yang; Qiu Ziao; Hong Jinlong; Hou Yujie; Qian Zhiyong | Swimming | Men's 4 × 200 metre freestyle relay | August 20 |
| Silver | Fu Yiting | Fencing | Women's individual foil | August 20 |
| Silver | Pei Xingru | Wrestling | Women's freestyle 57 kg | August 20 |
| Silver | Deng Zhiwei | Wrestling | Men's freestyle 125 kg | August 20 |
| Silver | Li Hongfeng | Cycling | Women's cross-country | August 21 |
| Silver | Lü Xianjing | Cycling | Men's cross-country | August 21 |
| Silver | Fu Yuanhui | Swimming | Women's 50 metre backstroke | August 21 |
| Silver | Zhang Yufei | Swimming | Women's 100 metre butterfly | August 21 |
| Silver | Sun Yiwen | Fencing | Women's individual épée | August 21 |
| Silver | Luo Huan | Gymnastics | Women's artistic individual all-around | August 21 |
| Silver | Chen Fangjia | Canoeing | Men's slalom C-1 | August 22 |
| Silver | Li Tong | Canoeing | Women's slalom K-1 | August 22 |
| Silver | Cai Yanyan; Chen Qingchen; Chen Yufei; Gao Fangjie; He Bingjiao; Huang Dongping; Huang Yaqiong; Jia Yifan; Tang Jinhua; Zheng Yu | Badminton | Women's team | August 22 |
| Silver | Pu Yixian | Cycling | Women's road race | August 22 |
| Silver | Zhao Shuai | Taekwondo | Men's 63 kg | August 22 |
| Silver | Li Zhuhao | Swimming | Men's 100 metre butterfly | August 22 |
| Silver | Yang Junxuan | Swimming | Women's 200 metre freestyle | August 22 |
| Silver | Yang Zibei | Swimming | Men's 100 metre breaststroke | August 22 |
| Silver | Ma Yingjia; Qian Jiarui; Shao Yaqi; Yang Hengyu | Fencing | Women's team sabre | August 22 |
| Silver | Dong Chao; Lan Minghao; Shi Gaofeng; Xue Yangdong | Fencing | Men's team épée | August 22 |
| Silver | Yang Jintong; Cao Jiwen; Sun Yang; Yu Hexin; Hou Yujie; Qian Zhiyong; Ma Tianchi; Ji Xinjie | Swimming | Men's 4 × 100 metre freestyle relay | August 22 |
| Silver | Xiao Di | Wrestling | Men's Greco-Roman 97 kg | August 22 |
| Silver | Zhang Zhiyuan; Chen Sensen | Rowing | Men's double sculls | August 23 |
| Silver | Wang Xuetao | Wushu | Men's sanda 60 kg | August 23 |
| Silver | Shi Zhanwei | Wushu | Men's sanda 70 kg | August 23 |
| Silver | Bai Yiting | Shooting | Women's double trap | August 23 |
| Silver | Zou Jingyuan | Gymnastics | Men's pommel horse | August 23 |
| Silver | Wang Peng | Swimming | Men's 50 metre butterfly | August 23 |
| Silver | Luo Huan | Gymnastics | Women's uneven bars | August 23 |
| Silver | Zhong Qixin | Sport climbing | Men's speed | August 23 |
| Silver | Li Bingjie | Swimming | Women's 800 metre freestyle | August 23 |
| Silver | Chen Qingyuan; Fu Yiting; Huo Xingxin; Shi Yue | Fencing | Women's team foil | August 23 |
| Silver | Zhang Shuai | Tennis | Women's singles | August 24 |
| Silver | Xiao Ruoteng | Gymnastics | Men's parallel bars | August 24 |
| Silver | Liu Xiang | Swimming | Women's 50 metre freestyle | August 24 |
| Silver | Yang Zibei | Swimming | Men's 50 metre breaststroke | August 24 |
| Silver | Li Bingjie | Swimming | Women's 400 metre freestyle | August 24 |
| Silver | Sun Wei | Gymnastics | Men's horizontal bar | August 24 |
| Silver | Wu Yibing | Tennis | Men's singles | August 25 |
| Silver | Lin Junmin | Shooting | Men's 25 metre rapid fire pistol | August 25 |
| Silver | Gao Mengmeng | Karate | Women's +68 kg | August 25 |
| Silver | Wang Zheng | Athletics | Women's hammer throw | August 25 |
| Silver | Liu Yang | Athletics | Men's shot put | August 25 |
| Silver | Jin Cheng; Chen Yilong; Zhang Huachuang; Yuan Yechun | Golf | Men's team | August 26 |
| Silver | Liu Wenbo | Golf | Women's individual | August 26 |
| Silver | Peng Xiaojuan; Dong Aili; Chen Chen; Wang Jing; Wang Li; Xu Fengxue; Zhong Yuan; Chen Xue; Tang Shenglan; Song Yanbing; Liang Liping; Huang Yi; Hu Chen; Bai Ge; Pan Huizhu; Li Lianying | Canoeing | Women's TBR-12 500 metres | August 26 |
| Silver | Jiao Fangxu; Gao Jiawen; Cai Wenxuan; Liu Xuegang; Du Zhuan; Yin Zhonghai; Zhang Zhen; Zeng Delin; Chen Guangqin; Su Bopin; Li Shuai; Chen Juntong; Ling Wenwei; Feng Guojing; Li Guisen; Zhou Guichao | Canoeing | Men's TBR-12 500 metres | August 26 |
| Silver | Wei Meng | Shooting | Women's skeet | August 26 |
| Silver | Jin Di | Shooting | Men's skeet | August 26 |
| Silver | Gao Yang | Athletics | Women's shot put | August 26 |
| Silver | Zhang Yaoguang | Athletics | Men's long jump | August 26 |
| Silver | Liu Qizhen | Athletics | Men's javelin throw | August 27 |
| Silver | Tang Lingling | Karate | Women's 68 kg | August 27 |
| Silver | Deng Lijuan; Niu Di; Pan Xuhua | Sport climbing | Women's speed relay | August 27 |
| Silver | Chen Qiaolin; Liu Jiali; Wang Hong; Wang Xiaofei; Ma Menglu; Jin Chenhong | Cycling | Women's team pursuit | August 28 |
| Silver | Lü Huihui | Athletics | Women's javelin throw | August 28 |
| Silver | Qieyang Shenjie | Athletics | Women's 20 kilometres walk | August 29 |
| Silver | Wang Qingling | Athletics | Women's heptathlon | August 29 |
| Silver | Yao Jie | Athletics | Men's pole vault | August 29 |
| Silver | Wang Qin | Athletics | Men's 50 kilometres walk | August 30 |
| Silver | Gao Lei | Gymnastics | Men's trampoline | August 30 |
| Silver | Wang Hong | Cycling | Women's individual pursuit | August 30 |
| Silver | China women's national handball team: Lin Yanqun; Zhang Haixia; Li Xiaoqing; Wu Yin; Wu Nana; Yu Yuanyuan; Wang Haiye; Si Wen; Liu Xiaomei; Sha Zhengwen; Yang Jiao; Zhao Jiaqin; Yang Yurou; Li Yao; Qiao Ru; Lan Xiaoling | Handball | Women's tournament | August 30 |
| Silver | Liang Xiaojing; Wei Yongli; Ge Manqi; Yuan Qiqi; Huang Guifen; Kong Lingwei | Athletics | Women's 4 × 100 metres relay | August 30 |
| Silver | Feng Bin | Athletics | Women's discus throw | August 30 |
| Silver | Zhang Jiaqi | Diving | Women's 10 metre platform | August 30 |
| Silver | Lin Gaoyuan; Wang Manyu | Table tennis | Mixed doubles | August 30 |
| Silver | Liu Chengming | Diving | Men's 1 metre springboard | August 30 |
| Silver | Zhong Mengying | Triathlon | Women's individual | August 31 |
| Silver | Wang Chao; Xu Zangjun | Sailing | Men's 470 | August 31 |
| Silver | Wei Menxi; Gao Haiyan | Sailing | Women's 470 | August 31 |
| Silver | Zhang Dongshuang | Sailing | Laser Radial | August 31 |
| Silver | Wang Jianxiong | Sailing | Open Laser 4.7 | August 31 |
| Silver | Guo Dan | Roller sports | Women's 20000 metres elimination | August 31 |
| Silver | Chen Yiwen | Diving | Women's 1 metre springboard | August 31 |
| Silver | China women's national football team: Zhao Lina; Han Peng; Huang Yini; Lou Jiahui; Wu Haiyan; Lin Yuping; Wang Shuang; Li Jiayue; Ren Guixin; Li Ying; Wang Shanshan; Wang Yan; Li Tingting; Zhao Rong; Xiao Yuyi; Yang Lina; Gu Yasha; Li Mengwen; Bi Xiaolin; Zhang Rui | Football | Women's tournament | August 31 |
| Silver | Cao Yuan | Diving | Men's 3 metre springboard | August 31 |
| Silver | Li Yue | Canoeing | Women's K-1 200 metres | September 1 |
| Silver | Yang Lixin; Chen Gang | Bridge | Men's pair | September 1 |
| Silver | Chen Meng | Table tennis | Women's singles | September 1 |
| Silver | Lin Gaoyuan | Table tennis | Men's singles | September 1 |
| Silver | Wang Han | Diving | Women's 3 metre springboard | September 1 |
| Silver | China women's national rugby sevens team: Lu Yuanyuan; Yang Min; Chen Ming; Hu Yu; Yan Meiling; Wang Wanyu; Chen Keyi; Liu Xiaoqian; Yu Xiaoming; Yu Liping; Gao Yueying; Sun Caihong | Rugby sevens | Women's tournament | September 1 |
| Silver | Qiu Bo | Diving | Men's 10 metre platform | September 1 |
| Bronze | Ji Xinjie | Swimming | Men's 200 metre freestyle | August 19 |
| Bronze | Peng Xuwei | Swimming | Women's 200 metre backstroke | August 19 |
| Bronze | Shi Jinglin | Swimming | Women's 100 metre breaststroke | August 19 |
| Bronze | Li Zhuhao | Swimming | Men's 200 metre butterfly | August 19 |
| Bronze | Zhao Mengyu | Taekwondo | Women's 67 kg | August 20 |
| Bronze | Lin Xintong | Swimming | Women's 50 metre butterfly | August 20 |
| Bronze | Yang Junxuan | Swimming | Women's 100 metre freestyle | August 20 |
| Bronze | Qin Haiyang | Swimming | Men's 200 metre individual medley | August 20 |
| Bronze | Xiao Ruoteng | Gymnastics | Men's artistic individual all-around | August 20 |
| Bronze | Gao Pan | Taekwondo | Women's +67 kg | August 21 |
| Bronze | Du Yu; Wang Xiaojing | Shooting | Mixed trap team | August 21 |
| Bronze | Qin Haiyang | Swimming | Men's 200 metre breaststroke | August 21 |
| Bronze | Wang Shun | Swimming | Men's 400 metre individual medley | August 22 |
| Bronze | Yang Bin | Wrestling | Men's Greco-Roman 77 kg | August 22 |
| Bronze | Chen Jie | Swimming | Women's 100 metre backstroke | August 22 |
| Bronze | Lu Yang; Wang Shi; Xu Yingming; Yan Yinghui | Fencing | Men's team sabre | August 23 |
| Bronze | Lin Chaopan | Gymnastics | Men's floor | August 23 |
| Bronze | Sun Wei | Gymnastics | Men's pommel horse | August 23 |
| Bronze | Feng Junyang | Swimming | Women's 50 metre breaststroke | August 23 |
| Bronze | He Cuilian | Sport climbing | Women's speed | August 23 |
| Bronze | Yu Hexin | Swimming | Men's 100 metre freestyle | August 23 |
| Bronze | Huang Mengkai; Li Chen; Ma Jianfei; Shi Jialuo | Fencing | Men's team foil | August 24 |
| Bronze | China women's national softball team: Chai Yinan; Chen Jia; Li Huan; Li Qi; Liu Lili; Liu Yining; Lu Ying; Ren Min; Wang Bei; Wang Lan; Wang Mengyan; Wang Xiaoqing; Xi Kailin; Xu Jia; Xu Qianwen; Zhang Yan; Zhao Xinxing | Softball | Women's tournament | August 24 |
| Bronze | Zhang Jin | Gymnastics | Women's balance beam | August 24 |
| Bronze | Wu Qingfeng | Swimming | Women's 50 metre freestyle | August 24 |
| Bronze | Xiao Ruoteng | Gymnastics | Men's horizontal bar | August 24 |
| Bronze | Ji Xinjie | Swimming | Men's 1500 metre freestyle | August 24 |
| Bronze | Duo Bujie | Athletics | Men's marathon | August 25 |
| Bronze | Gan Yu | Shooting | Men's 10 metre running target mixed | August 25 |
| Bronze | Zhang Deshun | Athletics | Women's 10,000 metres | August 25 |
| Bronze | Liu Wenbo; Du Mohan; Yin Ruoning | Golf | Women's team | August 26 |
| Bronze | Jin Cheng | Golf | Men's individual | August 26 |
| Bronze | Hua Tian | Equestrian | Individual eventing | August 26 |
| Bronze | Chen Gang; Ju Chuancheng; Shi Haojun; Shi Zhengjun; Yang Lixin; Zhuang Zejun | Bridge | Men's team | August 26 |
| Bronze | Wang Yilyu; Huang Dongping | Badminton | Mixed doubles | August 26 |
| Bronze | Zhao Changhong | Athletics | men's 10,000 metres | August 26 |
| Bronze | Wei Yongli | Athletics | Women's 100 metres | August 26 |
| Bronze | Li Jialun; Sun Quan; Xu Tianyu | Archery | Men's team recurve | August 27 |
| Bronze | Li Junhui; Liu Yuchen | Badminton | Men's doubles | August 27 |
| Bronze | Xu Tianyu; Zhang Xinyan | Archery | Mixed team recurve | August 27 |
| Bronze | He Cuilian; Ni Mingwei; Qiu Haimei; Song Yiling | Sport climbing | Women's speed relay | August 27 |
| Bronze | Li Jinxin; Liang Rongqi; Ou Zhiyong | Sport climbing | Men's speed relay | August 27 |
| Bronze | Xu Xiaoling | Athletics | Women's long jump | August 27 |
| Bronze | Zhong Tianshi | Cycling | Women's keirin | August 28 |
| Bronze | Zhao Yating | Gymnastics | Women's rhythmic individual all-around | August 28 |
| Bronze | Jin Xiangqian | Athletics | Men's 20 kilometres walk | August 29 |
| Bronze | Zhang Xin | Roller sports | Women's park | August 29 |
| Bronze | Yu Yuanyi | Soft tennis | Women's singles | August 29 |
| Bronze | Wei Yongli | Athletics | Women's 200 metres | August 29 |
| Bronze | Cao Shuo | Athletics | Men's triple jump | August 29 |
| Bronze | Zhu Shouli | Gymnastics | Women's trampoline | August 30 |
| Bronze | Tang Jing | Judo | Women's 63 kg | August 30 |
| Bronze | Xu Haiyang; Mi Hong; Su Bingtian; Xu Zhouzheng | Athletics | Men's 4 × 100 metres relay | August 30 |
| Bronze | Liu Jiali; Wang Xiaofei | Cycling | Women's madison | August 31 |
| Bronze | Shan Jun | Boxing | Men's 60 kg | August 31 |
| Bronze | Ma Zhenzhao | Judo | Women's 78 kg | August 31 |
| Bronze | Wang Yan | Judo | Women's +78 kg | August 31 |
| Bronze | Wu Zhonglin | Boxing | Men's 49 kg | August 31 |
| Bronze | Xu Boxiang | Boxing | Men's 56 kg | August 31 |
| Bronze | China women's national field hockey team: Gu Bingfeng; Song Xiaoming; Li Jiaqi; Cui Qiuxia; Zhou Yu; Peng Yang; Liang Meiyu; Li Hong; Zhang Jinrong; Ou Zixia; Zhang Xiaoxue; He Jiangxin; Chen Yi; De Jiaojiao; Xi Xiayun; Chen Yi; Dan Wen; Ye Jiao | Field hockey | Women's tournament | August 31 |
| Bronze | Li Mingxu | Triathlon | Men's individual | September 1 |
| Bronze | Feng Zixuan; Liu Yin; Ma Yue; Wang Yufei; Yu Yuanyi | Soft tennis | Women's team | September 1 |
| Bronze | Huang Yan; Wang Nan | Bridge | Women's pair | September 1 |
| Bronze | Bayand Delihei; Bu Hebilige; Feng Xuemei; Jiang Yanan; Liu Hongyan; Qing Daga; Qiu Shangao; Shen Zhuhong; Wang Yan; Xie Yadong; Zhang Wen; Zhu Ya | Judo | Mixed team | September 1 |
| Bronze | Luo Shuai | Modern pentathlon | Men's individual | September 1 |

Demonstration events

| Medal | Name | Sport | Event | Date |
|---|---|---|---|---|
| Gold | Zhang Yuchen; Liu Mingjie; Pan Jiadong; Wang Tianlong; Xiang Yang; Xie Tao | eSports | Arena of Valor tournament | August 26 |
| Gold | Yan Junze; Liu Shiyu; Su Hanwei; Jian Zihao; Tian Ye; Shi Senming | eSports | League of Legends tournament | August 29 |
| Silver | Huang Chenghui | eSports | Clash Royale tournament | August 27 |

== Competitors ==
The following is the list of number of competitors participating in the Games. Note that reserves in fencing, field hockey, football, and handball are counted as athletes:

| Sport | Men | Women | Total |
|---|---|---|---|
| Archery | 4 | 4 | 8 |
| Artistic swimming | — | 10 | 10 |
| Athletics | 41 | 40 | 81 |
| Badminton | 10 | 10 | 20 |
| Baseball | 24 | — | 24 |
| Basketball | 16 | 16 | 32 |
| Bowling | 3 | 3 | 6 |
| Boxing | 7 | 3 | 10 |
| Canoeing | 27 | 27 | 54 |
| Contract bridge | 13 | 11 | 24 |
| Cycling | 20 | 16 | 36 |
| Diving | 8 | 7 | 15 |
| Equestrian | 5 | 0 | 5 |
| Fencing | 12 | 12 | 24 |
| Field hockey | 0 | 18 | 18 |
| Football | 20 | 20 | 40 |
| Golf | 4 | 3 | 7 |
| Gymnastics | 7 | 11 | 18 |
| Handball | 0 | 16 | 16 |
| Jet ski | 2 | 0 | 2 |
| Ju-jitsu | 1 | 1 | 2 |
| Judo | 10 | 10 | 20 |
| Karate | 4 | 4 | 8 |
| Modern pentathlon | 2 | 2 | 4 |
| Paragliding | 5 | 3 | 8 |
| Roller sports | 5 | 6 | 11 |
| Rowing | 9 | 12 | 21 |
| Rugby sevens | 12 | 12 | 24 |
| Sailing | 8 | 8 | 16 |
| Sepak takraw | 6 | 0 | 6 |
| Shooting | 16 | 14 | 30 |
| Soft tennis | 0 | 5 | 5 |
| Softball | — | 17 | 17 |
| Sport climbing | 9 | 9 | 18 |
| Squash | 0 | 4 | 4 |
| Swimming | 24 | 28 | 52 |
| Table tennis | 5 | 5 | 10 |
| Taekwondo | 8 | 8 | 16 |
| Tennis | 6 | 6 | 12 |
| Triathlon | 3 | 2 | 5 |
| Volleyball | 18 | 18 | 36 |
| Water polo | 13 | 13 | 26 |
| Weightlifting | 8 | 7 | 15 |
| Wrestling | 12 | 6 | 18 |
| Wushu | 8 | 5 | 13 |
| Total | 415 | 432 | 847 |

Demonstration events

| Sport | Men | Women | Total |
|---|---|---|---|
| eSports | 13 | 0 | 13 |

== Archery ==
Recurve

| Athlete | Event | Ranking round | | Round of 64 | Round of 32 | Round of 16 | Quarterfinals | Semifinals | Final / BM | |
| Athlete | Event | Score | Seed | Opposition Score | Opposition Score | Opposition Score | Opposition Score | Opposition Score | Opposition Score | Rank |
|---|---|---|---|---|---|---|---|---|---|---|
| Li Jialun | Men's individual | 660 | 10 | Bye | Rezowan (BAN); W 6–2 | Furakawa (JPN); L 4–6 | Did not advance | | | |
| Sun Quan | Men's individual | 660 | 15 | Did not advance | | | | | | |
| Wei Shaoxuan | Men's individual | 656 | 20 | Did not advance | | | | | | |
| Xu Tianyu | Men's individual | 666 | 9 | Bye | Magar (NEP); W 6–4 | Wei (TPE); L 2–6 | Did not advance | | | |
| Li Jialun; Sun Quan; Xu Tianyu | Men's team | 1986 | 4 | —N/a | Bye | Thailand (THA); W 5–1 | Iran (IRI); W 6–0 | South Korea (KOR); L 3–5 | Mongolia (MGL); W 6–0 | 3rd place, bronze medalist(s) |
| Cao Hui | Women's individual | 655 | 9 | Bye | Altangerel (MGL); W 7–1 | Loc (VIE); W 6–4 | Kang (KOR); L 2–6 | Did not advance | | |
| Zhai Yuejun | Women's individual | 639 | 24 | Did not advance | | | | | | |
| Zhang Dan | Women's individual | 626 | 29 | Did not advance | | | | | | |
| Zhang Xinyan | Women's individual | 666 | 5 | Bye | Wu (HKG); W 6–0 | Thidar (MYA); W 6–0 | Tan (TPE); W 6–4 | Kang (KOR); W 6–4 | Choirunisa (INA); W 7–3 | 1st place, gold medalist(s) |
| Cao Hui; Zhang Xinyan; Zhai Yuejun | Women's team | 1960 | 3 | —N/a | | Kyrgyzstan (KGZ); W 6–0 | Kazakhstan (KAZ); W 6–2 | Chinese Taipei (TPE); L 3–5 | Japan (JPN); L 2–6 | 4 |
| Xu Tianyu; Zhang Xinyan | Mixed team | 1332 | 3 | —N/a | Bye | Myanmar (MYA); W 5–1 | Vietnam (VIE); W 6–0 | North Korea (PRK); L 2–6 | Mongolia (MGL); W 6–2 | 3rd place, bronze medalist(s) |

== Artistic swimming ==
| Athlete | Event | Technical routine | | Free routine | | Total | Rank |
| Athlete | Event | Points | Rank | Points | Rank | Total | Rank |
|---|---|---|---|---|---|---|---|
| Jiang Wenwen; Jiang Tingting | Duet | 92.4101 | 1 | 94.1000 | 1 | 186.5101 | 1st place, gold medalist(s) |
| Chang Hao; Feng Yu; Guo Li; Liang Xinping; Wang Liuyi; Wang Qianyi; Xiao Yanning; Yin Chengxin | Team | 92.5062 | 1 | 94.4333 | 1 | 186.9395 | 1st place, gold medalist(s) |

== Badminton ==
Men

| Athlete | Event | Round of 64 | Round of 32 | Round of 16 | Quarterfinals | Semifinals | Final | |
| Athlete | Event | Opposition Score | Opposition Score | Opposition Score | Opposition Score | Opposition Score | Opposition Score | Rank |
|---|---|---|---|---|---|---|---|---|
| Shi Yuqi | Singles | Bye | J Christie (INA); L (19–21, 21–19, 17–21) | Did not advance | | | | |
| Chen Long | Singles | Bye | M I S Bhatti (PAK); W (21–8, 21–10) | Heo K-h (KOR); W (24–22, 21–8) | A S Ginting (INA); L (19–21, 11–21) | Did not advance | | |
| Li Junhui; Liu Yuchen | Doubles | —N/a | Bye | M Attri / B. S Reddy (IND); W (21–13, 17–21, 25–23) | S Dias / B Goonethilleka (SRI); W (21–12, 21–15) | F Alfian / M R Ardianto (INA); L (14–21, 21–19, 13–21) | Did not advance | 3rd place, bronze medalist(s) |
| Liu Cheng; Zhang Nan | Doubles | —N/a | Bye | Lee J-h / Lee Y (TPE); L (22–20, 16–21, 16–21) | Did not advance | | | |
| Chen Long; Li Junhui; Lin Dan; Liu Cheng; Liu Yuchen; Qiao Bin; Shi Yuqi; Wang Yilyu; Zhang Nan; Zheng Siwei | Team | —N/a | | Bye | Hong Kong; W 3–0 | Chinese Taipei; W 3–1 | Indonesia; W 3–1 | 1st place, gold medalist(s) |

Women

| Athlete | Event | Round of 32 | Round of 16 | Quarterfinals | Semifinals | Final | |
| Athlete | Event | Opposition Score | Opposition Score | Opposition Score | Opposition Score | Opposition Score | Rank |
|---|---|---|---|---|---|---|---|
| Chen Yufei | Singles | An S-y (KOR); W (21–15, 21–8) | Yip P Y (HKG); W (22–20, 21–17) | A Yamaguchi (JPN); L (19–21, 11–21) | Did not advance | | |
| He Bingjiao | Singles | Nguyễn T L (VIE); W (21–14, 21–5) | N Okuhara (JPN); L (10–21, 12–21) | Did not advance | | | |
| Chen Qingchen; Jia Yifan | Doubles | Bye | J Kititharakul / R Prajongjai (THA); W (21–15, 21–17) | A Ponnappa / N. S Reddy (IND); W (21–11, 24–22) | Y Fukushima / S Hirota (JPN); W (21–17, 21–8) | M Matsutomo / A Takahashi (JPN); W (22–20, 22–20) | 1st place, gold medalist(s) |
| Tang Jinhua; Zheng Yu | Doubles | T Hendahewa / K Sirimannage (SRI); W (21–13, 21–12) | Hsu Y-c / Wu T-j (TPE); W (21–17, 21–14) | G Polii / A Rahayu (INA); L (21–18, 22–24, 16–21) | Did not advance | | |
| Cai Yanyan; Chen Qingchen; Chen Yufei; Gao Fangjie; He Bingjiao; Huang Dongping; Huang Yaqiong; Jia Yifan; Tang Jinhua; Zheng Yu | Team | —N/a | Bye | Maldives; W 3–0 | Thailand; W 3–0 | Japan; L 1–3 | 2nd place, silver medalist(s) |

Mixed

| Athlete | Event | Round of 32 | Round of 16 | Quarterfinals | Semifinals | Final | |
| Athlete | Event | Opposition Score | Opposition Score | Opposition Score | Opposition Score | Opposition Score | Rank |
|---|---|---|---|---|---|---|---|
| Zheng Siwei; Huang Yaqiong | Mixed | Bye | Lee Y / Hsu Y-c (TPE); W (21–19, 21–16) | T Hoki / K Yonemoto (JPN); W (21–13, 21–15) | T Ahmad / L Natsir (INA); W (21–13, 21–18) | Tang C M / Tse Y S (HKG); W (21–8, 21–15) | 1st place, gold medalist(s) |
| Wang Yilyu; Huang Dongping | Mixed | Bye | Che P N / Gong X X (MAC); W (21–7, 21–8) | Y Watanabe / A Higashino (JPN); W (21–17, 18–21, 21–17) | Tang C M / Tse Y S (HKG); L (20–22, 21–19, 21–23) | Did not advance | 3rd place, bronze medalist(s) |

== Baseball ==
China entered their team at the Games, and started to compete in the round 2 group A.

| Team | Event | Round 1 | | Round 2 | | Super / Consolation | | Final / BM | |
| Team | Event | Oppositions Scores | Rank | Oppositions Scores | Rank | Oppositions Scores | Rank | Opposition Score | Rank |
|---|---|---|---|---|---|---|---|---|---|
| China men's | Men's tournament | Bye | | Thailand: W 15–0 (F/6); Japan: L 2–17 (F/5); Pakistan: W 16–3 (F/8) | 2 Q | Chinese Taipei: L 0–1; South Korea: L 1–10 | 4 QB | Chinese Taipei: L 0–10 (F/8) | 4 |

Roster

The following is the China roster for the men's baseball tournament of the 2018 Asian Games.

Manager
John McLaren

Coaches
Jimmy Johnson
Chen Kun
Yi Sheng

| Pos. | No. | Player | Date of birth (age) | Bats | Throws | Club |
|---|---|---|---|---|---|---|
| IF | 17 | Chen Chen | 18 March 1995 (aged 23) | | | (China) Huge Horse Jiangsu |
| P | 18 | Meng Weiqiang | 31 May 1989 (aged 29) | | | (China) Leopard Guangdong |
| | 19 | Na Chuang | 15 May 1987 (aged 31) | | | (China) Leopard Guangdong |
| C | 20 | Li Ning | 12 November 1994 (aged 23) | | | (China) Eagles Shanghai |
| P | 21 | Yang Yanyong | 5 May 1994 (aged 24) | | | (China) Eagles Shanghai |
| P | 22 | Liu Yu | 15 September 1991 (aged 26) | | | (China) Tiger Beijing |
| IF | 23 | Du Xiaolei | 25 May 1990 (aged 28) | | | (China) Huge Horse Jiangsu |
| P | 24 | Zhu Jinghao | 6 April 1996 (aged 22) | | | (China) Huge Horse Jiangsu |
| C | 25 | Luan Chenchen | 16 January 1996 (aged 22) | | | (China) Huge Horse Jiangsu |
| | 26 | Chen Junpeng | 24 October 1995 (aged 22) | | | (China) Dragon Sichuan |
| OF | 27 | Song Yunqi | 14 January 1996 (aged 22) | | | (China) Tiger Beijing |
| OF | 28 | Lu Zhenhong | 15 April 1991 (aged 27) | | | (China) Huge Horse Jiangsu |
| | 29 | Luo Jinjun | 8 January 1995 (aged 23) | | | (China) Leopard Jiangsu |
| IF | 30 | Chu Fujia | 10 September 1989 (aged 28) | | | (China) Huge Horse Jiangsu |
| P | 31 | Lu Yusong | 6 February 1992 (aged 26) | | | (China) Elephant Henan |
| OF | 32 | Yang Shunyi | 1 January 1993 (aged 25) | | | (China) Lion Tianjin |
| P | 34 | Zheng Chaoqun | 9 February 1993 (aged 25) | | | (China) Huge Horse Jiangsu |
| P | 35 | Sun Jianzeng | 2 April 1992 (aged 26) | | | (China) Lion Tianjin |
| IF | 36 | Yang Jin | 18 November 1998 (aged 19) | | | (China) Eagles Shanghai |
| P | 38 | Ran Song | 7 March 1992 (aged 26) | | | (China) Dragon Sichuan |
| P | 39 | Gan Quan | 17 June 1996 (aged 22) | | | (China) Dragon Sichuan |
| P | 40 | Cui Enting | 20 June 1996 (aged 22) | | | (China) Lion Tianjin |
| P | 41 | Qi Xin | 13 February 1997 (aged 21) | | | (China) Tiger Beijing |
| P | 59 | Gong Haicheng | 28 December 1998 (aged 19) | | | (China) Eagles Shanghai |

Round 2 – Group A

| Pos | Team | Pld | W | L | RF | RA | PCT | GB | Qualification |
|---|---|---|---|---|---|---|---|---|---|
| 1 | Japan | 3 | 3 | 0 | 56 | 2 | 1.000 | — | Super round |
| 2 | China | 3 | 2 | 1 | 33 | 20 | .667 | 1 | Super round |
| 3 | Pakistan | 3 | 1 | 2 | 11 | 32 | .333 | 2 | Consolation round |
| 4 | Thailand | 3 | 0 | 3 | 1 | 47 | .000 | 3 | Consolation round |

Source: OCA

| 26 August; 14:00 | China | 15–0 (F/6) | Thailand | Rawamangun Baseball Field, Jakarta; Attendance: 150; Umpires: Yang Jae-man (KOR) |
| 26 August; 14:00 | WP: Gan Quan | Boxscore | LP: Siraphop Nadee | Rawamangun Baseball Field, Jakarta; Attendance: 150; Umpires: Yang Jae-man (KOR) |
| 26 August; 14:00 | HR: Lu Zhenhong (1) | Boxscore | | Rawamangun Baseball Field, Jakarta; Attendance: 150; Umpires: Yang Jae-man (KOR) |

| Team | 1 | 2 | 3 | 4 | 5 | 6 | 7 | 8 | 9 | R | H | E |
|---|---|---|---|---|---|---|---|---|---|---|---|---|
| Thailand | 0 | 0 | 0 | 0 | 0 | 0 | — | — | — | 0 | 1 | 4 |
| China | 0 | 4 | 0 | 5 | 1 | 5 | — | — | — | 15 | 15 | 0 |

| 27 August; 14:00 | Japan | 17–2 (F/5) | China | Rawamangun Baseball Field, Jakarta; Attendance: 150; Umpires: Chu Hsu-kuang (TPE) |
| 27 August; 14:00 | WP: Akiyoshi Katsuno | Boxscore | LP: Gong Haicheng | Rawamangun Baseball Field, Jakarta; Attendance: 150; Umpires: Chu Hsu-kuang (TPE) |
| 27 August; 14:00 | HR: Shohei Morishita (1), Momotaro Matsumoto (2), Tsuyoshi Tamura (1) | Boxscore | | Rawamangun Baseball Field, Jakarta; Attendance: 150; Umpires: Chu Hsu-kuang (TPE) |

| Team | 1 | 2 | 3 | 4 | 5 | 6 | 7 | 8 | 9 | R | H | E |
|---|---|---|---|---|---|---|---|---|---|---|---|---|
| China | 0 | 0 | 0 | 2 | 0 | — | — | — | — | 2 | 5 | 0 |
| Japan | 13 | 1 | 2 | 0 | 1 | — | — | — | — | 17 | 17 | 0 |

| 28 August; 14:00 | Pakistan | 3–16 (F/7) | China | Rawamangun Baseball Field, Jakarta; Attendance: 100; Umpires: Yang Jae-man (KOR) |
| 28 August; 14:00 | LP: Ihsanullah | Boxscore | WP: Meng Weiqiang | Rawamangun Baseball Field, Jakarta; Attendance: 100; Umpires: Yang Jae-man (KOR) |
| 28 August; 14:00 | | Boxscore | HR: Chen Chen (1), Song Yunqi (1) | Rawamangun Baseball Field, Jakarta; Attendance: 100; Umpires: Yang Jae-man (KOR) |

| Team | 1 | 2 | 3 | 4 | 5 | 6 | 7 | 8 | 9 | R | H | E |
|---|---|---|---|---|---|---|---|---|---|---|---|---|
| China | 1 | 3 | 0 | 0 | 3 | 0 | 9 | — | — | 16 | 19 | 1 |
| Pakistan | 0 | 0 | 0 | 0 | 1 | 0 | 2 | — | — | 3 | 6 | 3 |

Super round

| Pos | Team | Pld | W | L | RF | RA | PCT | GB | Qualification |
|---|---|---|---|---|---|---|---|---|---|
| 1 | South Korea | 3 | 2 | 1 | 16 | 4 | .667 (Note: Tied on head-to-head wins (1). Team quality balance: KOR +0.167, JPN +0.056, TPE −0.222.) | — | Gold medal match |
| 2 | Japan | 3 | 2 | 1 | 23 | 7 | .667 | — | Gold medal match |
| 3 | Chinese Taipei | 3 | 2 | 1 | 3 | 6 | .667 | — | Bronze medal match |
| 4 | China | 3 | 0 | 3 | 3 | 28 | .000 | 2 | Bronze medal match |

Source: OCA
Notes:

| 30 August; 18:30 | Chinese Taipei | 1–0 | China | Gelora Bung Karno Baseball Field, Jakarta; Attendance: 412; Umpires: Tomohisa Yamaguchi (JPN) |
| 30 August; 18:30 | WP: Huang Chien-lung; Sv: Wang Cheng-hao | Boxscore | LP: Gan Quan | Gelora Bung Karno Baseball Field, Jakarta; Attendance: 412; Umpires: Tomohisa Yamaguchi (JPN) |

| Team | 1 | 2 | 3 | 4 | 5 | 6 | 7 | 8 | 9 | R | H | E |
|---|---|---|---|---|---|---|---|---|---|---|---|---|
| China | 0 | 0 | 0 | 0 | 0 | 0 | 0 | 0 | 0 | 0 | 6 | 1 |
| Chinese Taipei | 0 | 0 | 0 | 0 | 0 | 1 | 0 | 0 | X | 1 | 6 | 0 |

| 31 August; 14:00 | South Korea | 10–1 | China | Gelora Bung Karno Baseball Field, Jakarta; Attendance: 400; Umpires: Huang Jun-jeh (TPE) |
| 31 August; 14:00 | WP: Im Gi-yeong | Boxscore | LP: Gong Haicheng | Gelora Bung Karno Baseball Field, Jakarta; Attendance: 400; Umpires: Huang Jun-jeh (TPE) |
| 31 August; 14:00 | HR: Park Byung-ho (1) | Boxscore | | Gelora Bung Karno Baseball Field, Jakarta; Attendance: 400; Umpires: Huang Jun-jeh (TPE) |

| Team | 1 | 2 | 3 | 4 | 5 | 6 | 7 | 8 | 9 | R | H | E |
|---|---|---|---|---|---|---|---|---|---|---|---|---|
| China | 0 | 0 | 0 | 0 | 0 | 0 | 1 | 0 | 0 | 1 | 8 | 2 |
| South Korea | 1 | 0 | 0 | 1 | 3 | 3 | 2 | 0 | X | 10 | 15 | 0 |

Bronze medal match

| 1 September; 11:00 | Chinese Taipei | 10–0 (F/8) | China | Gelora Bung Karno Baseball Field, Jakarta; Attendance: 850; Umpires: Tomohisa Yamaguchi (JPN) |
| 1 September; 11:00 | WP: Wang Tsung-hao | Boxscore | LP: Meng Weiqiang | Gelora Bung Karno Baseball Field, Jakarta; Attendance: 850; Umpires: Tomohisa Yamaguchi (JPN) |
| 1 September; 11:00 | HR: Chan Tzu-hsien (1) | Boxscore | | Gelora Bung Karno Baseball Field, Jakarta; Attendance: 850; Umpires: Tomohisa Yamaguchi (JPN) |

| Team | 1 | 2 | 3 | 4 | 5 | 6 | 7 | 8 | 9 | R | H | E |
|---|---|---|---|---|---|---|---|---|---|---|---|---|
| China | 0 | 0 | 0 | 0 | 0 | 0 | 0 | 0 | — | 0 | 2 | 2 |
| Chinese Taipei | 2 | 1 | 0 | 5 | 0 | 1 | 0 | 1 | — | 10 | 10 | 1 |

== Basketball ==
Summary

| Team | Event | Group Stage | | | | | Quarterfinal | Semifinals / Pl. | Final / BM / Pl. | |
| Team | Event | Opposition Score | Opposition Score | Opposition Score | Opposition Score | Rank | Opposition Score | Opposition Score | Opposition Score | Rank |
|---|---|---|---|---|---|---|---|---|---|---|
| China men's | Men's tournament | —N/a | | Philippines; W 82–80 | Kazakhstan; W 83–66 | 1 Q | Indonesia; W 98–63 | Chinese Taipei; W 86–63 | Iran; W 84–72 | 1st place, gold medalist(s) |
| China women's | Women's tournament | Thailand; W 110−42 | Japan; W 105−73 | Mongolia; W 110–36 | Hong Kong; W 123–31 | 1 Q | Indonesia; W 141–37 | Japan; W 86–74 | Korea; W 71–65 | 1st place, gold medalist(s) |
| China men's | Men's 3x3 tournament | Sri Lanka; W 21–14 | Vietnam; W 22–6 | Indonesia; W 22–13 | Thailand; W 21–16 | 1 Q | Qatar; W 21–18 | Iran; W 21–19 | South Korea; W 19–18 | 1st place, gold medalist(s) |
| China women's | Women's 3x3 tournament | —N/a | Qatar; W 22–3 | Vietnam; W 22–9 | Malaysia; W 22–14 | 1 Q | Iran; W 21–7 | Chinese Taipei; W 22–12 | Japan; W 22–10 | 1st place, gold medalist(s) |

=== 5x5 basketball ===
==== Men's tournament ====
Roster

China's roster for the men's basketball tournament of the 2018 Asian Games.

China men's national basketball team – 2018 Asian Games roster
Players
Coaches

| Pos. | No. | Name | Age – Date of birth | Height | Club | Ctr. |
|---|---|---|---|---|---|---|
| G | 1 | Tian Yuxiang | 25 – 17 August 1992 | 1.83 m (6 ft 0 in) | Bayi Rockets | (China) |
| G | 5 | Fang Shuo | 27 – 7 September 1990 | 1.90 m (6 ft 3 in) | Beijing Ducks | (China) |
| G/F | 6 | Zhao Tailong | 28 – 4 January 1990 | 1.97 m (6 ft 6 in) | Fujian Sturgeons | (China) |
| F | 7 | Yu Changdong | 26 – 26 October 1991 | 2.06 m (6 ft 9 in) | Xinjiang Flying Tigers | (China) |
| F | 8 | Ding Yanyuhang | 24 – 20 August 1993 | 2.00 m (6 ft 7 in) | Dallas Mavericks | (United States) |
| G | 10 | Zhao Rui | 22 – 14 January 1996 | 1.94 m (6 ft 4 in) | Guangdong Southern Tigers | (China) |
| G/F | 11 | Liu Zhixuan | 27 – 7 January 1991 | 1.95 m (6 ft 5 in) | Liaoning Flying Leopards | (China) |
| C | 15 | Zhou Qi | 22 – 16 January 1996 | 2.17 m (7 ft 1 in) | Houston Rockets | (United States) |
| C | 16 | Dong Hanlin | 27 – 15 February 1991 | 2.08 m (6 ft 10 in) | Shanghai Sharks | (China) |
| G | 17 | Sun Minghui | 22 – 26 April 1996 | 1.88 m (6 ft 2 in) | Zhejiang Lions | (China) |
| F | 23 | Abudushalamu Abudurexiti | 22 – 20 May 1996 | 2.03 m (6 ft 8 in) | Xinjiang Flying Tigers | (China) |
| C | 31 | Wang Zhelin | 24 – 20 January 1994 | 2.14 m (7 ft 0 in) | Fujian Sturgeons | (China) |

Head coach

- (China) Li Nan

Legend

- (C) Team captain
- Club – describes last
  club before the tournament
- Age – describes age
  on 14 August 2018

Group D

| Pos | Team | Pld | W | L | PF | PA | PD | Pts | Qualification |
|---|---|---|---|---|---|---|---|---|---|
| 1 | China | 2 | 2 | 0 | 165 | 146 | +19 | 4 | Quarterfinals |
| 2 | Philippines | 2 | 1 | 1 | 176 | 141 | +35 | 3 | Quarterfinals |
| 3 | Kazakhstan | 2 | 0 | 2 | 125 | 179 | −54 | 2 | |

Source: OCA

21 August
16:00

| Philippines | 80–82 | China |
Scoring by quarter: 12–20, 19–16, 26–23, 23–23
| Pts: Clarkson 28; Rebs: Clarkson, Standhardinger 8 Asts: Clarkson 4 | | Pts: Zhou 25; Rebs: Zhou 12; Asts: Liu, Sun 5 |

Gelora Bung Karno Basketball Hall, Jakarta
Referees: Yuen Chun Yip (HKG), Hadi Salem (IRI), Imran Ali Baig (IND)

23 August
16:00

| Kazakhstan | 66–83 | China |
Scoring by quarter: 18–26, 19–12, 12–31, 17–14
| Pts: Yergali 15; Rebs: Bazhin, Bykov, Marchuk 6 Asts: Yergali 7 | | Pts: Liu 18; Rebs: Abdusalam 11; Asts: Liu 6 |

Gelora Bung Karno Basketball Hall, Jakarta
Referees: Mohammad Doust (IRI), Imran Ali Baig (IND), Anan Daraghma (PLE)

Quarter-final

27 August
18:30

| China | 98–63 | Indonesia |
Scoring by quarter: 26–13, 27–15, 27–16, 18–19
| Pts: Abdusalam 24; Rebs: Abdusalam 10; Asts: Fang, Zhao R., Sun 4 | | Pts: Johnson 20; Rebs: Johnson 9 Asts: Johnson 4 |

Gelora Bung Karno Basketball Hall, Jakarta
Referees: Mohammad Doust (IRI), Snehal Bendke (IND), Kim Jong-kuk (KOR)

Semi-final

30 August
18:30

| Chinese Taipei | 63–86 | China |
Scoring by quarter: 19–26, 11–11, 12–31, 21–18
| Pts: Liu 24; Rebs: Liu, Lin 5 Asts: Liu, Chen Y., Lin 2 | | Pts: Zhou 22; Rebs: Zhou 16; Asts: Sun 6 |

Istora Gelora Bung Karno, Jakarta
Referees: Harja Jaladri (INA), Imran Ali Baig (IND), Anan Daraghma (PLE)

Gold medal game

1 September
18:30

| Iran | 72–84 | China |
Scoring by quarter: 25–18, 20–23, 11–18, 16–25
| Pts: Haddadi 27; Rebs: Haddadi 10; Asts: Nikkhah 8 | | Pts: Abdusalam 20; Rebs: Zhou 11; Asts: Fang 8 |

Istora Gelora Bung Karno, Jakarta
Referees: Ferdinand Pascual (PHI), Harja Jaladri (INA), Kim Jong-kuk (KOR)

==== Women's tournament ====
Roster

The following is the China roster for the women's basketball tournament of the 2018 Asian Games.

China women's national basketball team – 2018 Asian Games roster
Players
Coaches

| Pos. | No. | Name | Age – Date of birth | Height | Club | Ctr. |
|---|---|---|---|---|---|---|
| G | 4 | Li Yuan | 18 – 29 May 2000 | 1.68 m (5 ft 6 in) | Shandong Six Stars | (China) |
| G | 5 | Wang Siyu | 22 – 16 October 1995 | 1.75 m (5 ft 9 in) | Shandong Six Stars | (China) |
| G | 6 | Wang Lili | 25 – 8 September 1992 | 1.76 m (5 ft 9 in) | Xinjiang Magic Deer | (China) |
| F | 7 | Shao Ting | 28 – 10 December 1989 | 1.90 m (6 ft 3 in) | Beijing Great Wall | (China) |
| F | 9 | Li Meng | 23 – 2 January 1995 | 1.90 m (6 ft 3 in) | Shenyang Army Golden Lions | (China) |
| F | 10 | Wang Xuemeng | 24 – 20 October 1993 | 1.85 m (6 ft 1 in) | Bayi Kylin | (China) |
| F | 11 | Huang Sijing | 22 – 8 January 1996 | 1.90 m (6 ft 3 in) | Guangdong Dolphins | (China) |
| F | 12 | Liu Jiacen | 29 – 30 March 1989 | 1.90 m (6 ft 3 in) | Heilongjiang Dragons | (China) |
| C | 13 | Sun Mengran | 26 – 16 July 1992 | 1.95 m (6 ft 5 in) | Bayi Kylin | (China) |
| C | 14 | Li Yueru | 19 – 28 March 1999 | 2.00 m (6 ft 7 in) | Guangdong Dolphins | (China) |
| C | 15 | Han Xu | 18 – 31 October 1999 | 2.05 m (6 ft 9 in) | Xinjiang Magic Deer | (China) |

Head coach

- (China) Xu Limin

Legend

- (C) Team captain
- Club – describes last
  club before the tournament
- Age – describes age
  on 15 August 2018

Group Y

| Pos | Team | Pld | W | L | PF | PA | PD | Pts | Qualification |
|---|---|---|---|---|---|---|---|---|---|
| 1 | China | 4 | 4 | 0 | 448 | 182 | +266 | 8 | Quarterfinals |
| 2 | Japan | 4 | 3 | 1 | 392 | 225 | +167 | 7 | Quarterfinals |
| 3 | Thailand | 4 | 2 | 2 | 231 | 316 | −85 | 6 | Quarterfinals |
| 4 | Mongolia | 4 | 1 | 3 | 193 | 358 | −165 | 5 | Quarterfinals |
| 5 | Hong Kong | 4 | 0 | 4 | 230 | 413 | −183 | 4 | |

Source: OCA

15 August
10:00

| China | 110–42 | Thailand |
Scoring by quarter: 30–7, 23–12, 30–14, 27–9
| Pts: Sun 16; Rebs: Sun 10; Asts: Li Yua. 7 | | Pts: Prajuapsook 11; Rebs: Prajuapsook 4 Asts: Phromrat 3 |

Gelora Bung Karno Basketball Hall, Jakarta
Referees: Snehal Bendke (IND), Alexey Stepanenko (KAZ), Budi Marfan (INA)

17 August
12:30

| Japan | 73–105 | China |
Scoring by quarter: 22–35, 19–20, 18–26, 14–24
| Pts: Hayashi 17; Rebs: Suzuki 6 Asts: Miyazaki 12 | | Pts: Li M., Liu 18; Rebs: Sun, Han 8 Asts: Shao 7 |

Gelora Bung Karno Basketball Hall, Jakarta
Referees: Snehal Bendke (IND), Alexey Stepanenko (KAZ), Haryanto Sutaryo (INA)

20 August
12:30

| China | 110–36 | Mongolia |
Scoring by quarter: 26–15, 31–9, 26–9, 27–3
| Pts: Li Yue. 21; Rebs: Li Yue. 11; Asts: Wang S. 8 | | Pts: Bulbul 15; Rebs: Enerel 9 Asts: Bulbul 4 |

Gelora Bung Karno Basketball Hall, Jakarta
Referees: Alexey Stepanenko (KAZ), Snehal Bendke (IND), Lee Ji-youn (KOR)

23 August
10:00

| Hong Kong | 31–123 | China |
Scoring by quarter: 12–31, 10–29, 5–37, 4–26
| Pts: Cheuk 7 Rebs: Wong P. 5 Asts: Wong K.M. 3 | | Pts: Han 26; Rebs: Li Yue. 11; Asts: Li Yua. 8 |

Gelora Bung Karno Basketball Hall, Jakarta
Referees: Harja Jaladri (INA), Alexey Stepanenko (KAZ), Kim Jong-kuk (KOR)

Quarter-final

26 August
18:30

| China | 141–37 | Indonesia |
Scoring by quarter: 40–6, 29–7, 40–5, 32–19
| Pts: Li Yue. 25; Rebs: Li Yue. 10; Asts: Li Yua. 10 | | Pts: Christaline 10; Rebs: Gabriel 5 Asts: Christaline, Gabriel 3 |

Gelora Bung Karno Basketball Hall, Jakarta
Referees: Kim Jong-kuk (KOR), Preeda Muongmee (THA), Anan Daraghma (PLE)

Semi-final

30 August
12:30

| Japan | 74–86 | China |
Scoring by quarter: 17–20, 13–20, 24–31, 20–15
| Pts: Shinozaki 17; Rebs: Nakada, Watanabe, Umezawa 4 Asts: Miyazaki 10 | | Pts: Shao 16; Rebs: Li Yue. 8 Asts: Shao 6 |

Istora Gelora Bung Karno, Jakarta
Referees: Watcharin Padungratchadakit (THA), Mohammad Doust (IRI), Haryanto Sutaryo (INA)

Gold medal game

1 September
16:00

| Korea | 65–71 | China |
Scoring by quarter: 22–23, 16–15, 15–20, 12–13
| Pts: Lim 24; Rebs: Park J.S. 13; Asts: Park H.J. 6 | | Pts: Shao 17; Rebs: Liu, Li Yue. 10; Asts: Wang S. 5 |

Istora Gelora Bung Karno, Jakarta
Referees: Snehal Bendke (IND), Kumiko Kumagai (JPN), Mohammad Doust (IRI)

=== 3x3 basketball ===
==== Men's tournament ====
Roster

The following is the China roster in the men's 3x3 basketball tournament of the 2018 Asian Games.

- Chen Gong
- Xiao Hailing
- Huang Wenwei
- Zeng Bingqiang

Pool A

| Pos | Team | Pld | W | L | PF | PA | PD | Qualification |
|---|---|---|---|---|---|---|---|---|
| 1 | China | 4 | 4 | 0 | 86 | 49 | +37 | Quarterfinals |
| 2 | Thailand | 4 | 3 | 1 | 74 | 53 | +21 | Quarterfinals |
| 3 | Indonesia | 4 | 2 | 2 | 67 | 59 | +8 | |
| 4 | Sri Lanka | 4 | 1 | 3 | 57 | 66 | −9 | |
| 5 | Vietnam | 4 | 0 | 4 | 28 | 85 | −57 | |

Source: OCA

21 August
15:00

| China | 21–14 | Sri Lanka |
| Pts: Zeng 9 | | Pts: Brent 6 |

Gelora Bung Karno Tennis Center Court, Jakarta
Referees: Ito (JPN), Rulyov (KAZ)

21 August
16:30

| Vietnam | 6–22 | China |
| Pts: Nguyễn Q. 3 | | Pts: Xiao 12 |

Gelora Bung Karno Tennis Center Court, Jakarta
Referees: Liu (MAS), Tan (SGP)

24 August
18:10

| Indonesia | 13–22 | China |
| Pts: Gosal, Goantara, Kosasih 4 | | Pts: Xiao 10 |

Gelora Bung Karno Tennis Center Court, Jakarta
Referees: Ito (JPN), Rulyov (KAZ)

24 August
19:40

| China | 21–16 | Thailand |
| Pts: Zeng 6 | | Pts: Sawathavorn 7 |

Gelora Bung Karno Tennis Center Court, Jakarta
Referees: Ito (JPN), Ibragimow (TKM)

Quarter-final

26 August
14:00

| China | 21–18 | Qatar |
| Pts: Huang 8 | | Pts: Muslić 7 |

Gelora Bung Karno Tennis Center Court, Jakarta
Referees: Ito (JPN), Rulyov (KAZ)

Semifinal

26 August
18:00

| China | 21–19 | Iran |
| Pts: Huang 9 | | Pts: Allahverdi 11 |

Gelora Bung Karno Tennis Center Court, Jakarta
Referees: Ito (JPN), Rulyov (KAZ)

Gold medal game

26 August
21:00

| China | 19–18 (OT) | South Korea |
| Pts: Huang 7 | | Pts: An 10 |

Gelora Bung Karno Tennis Center Court, Jakarta
Referees: Ito (JPN), Quinn (INA)

==== Women's tournament ====
Roster

The following is the China roster in the women's 3x3 basketball tournament of the 2018 Asian Games.

- Li Yingyun
- Jiang Jiayin
- Dilana Dilixiati
- Zhang Zhiting

Pool A

| Pos | Team | Pld | W | L | PF | PA | PD | Qualification |
|---|---|---|---|---|---|---|---|---|
| 1 | China | 3 | 3 | 0 | 66 | 26 | +40 | Quarterfinals |
| 2 | Malaysia | 3 | 2 | 1 | 45 | 41 | +4 | Quarterfinals |
| 3 | Vietnam | 3 | 1 | 2 | 33 | 41 | −8 | |
| 4 | Qatar | 3 | 0 | 3 | 16 | 52 | −36 | |

Source: OCA

21 August
16:50

| China | 22–3 | Qatar |
| Pts: Li, Jiang 8 | | Pts: Koshkosh 2 |

Gelora Bung Karno Tennis Center Court, Jakarta
Referees: Al-Harthi (OMA), Ito (JPN)

21 August
17:50

| China | 22–9 | Vietnam |
| Pts: Jiang 9 | | Pts: Nguyễn T.T. 5 |

Gelora Bung Karno Tennis Center Court, Jakarta
Referees: Lim (MAS), Ibragimow (TKM)

24 August
19:00

| Malaysia | 14–22 | China |
| Pts: Ho 8 | | Pts: Jiang 12 |

Gelora Bung Karno Tennis Center Court, Jakarta
Referees: Ito (JPN), Al-Harthi (OMA)

Quarter-final

26 August
14:40

| China | 21–7 | Iran |
| Pts: Jiang 9 | | Pts: Yazdian, Asadi 3 |

Gelora Bung Karno Tennis Center Court, Jakarta
Referees: Quinn (INA), Rulyov (KAZ)

Semifinal

26 August
17:00

| China | 21–12 | Chinese Taipei |
| Pts: Dilana 7 | | Pts: Wang 6 |

Gelora Bung Karno Tennis Center Court, Jakarta
Referees: Quinn (INA), Lim (MAS)

Gold medal game

26 August
20:30

| China | 21–10 | Japan |
| Pts: Li, Jiang 7 | | Pts: Mawuli 4 |

Gelora Bung Karno Tennis Center Court, Jakarta
Referees: Lim (MAS), Rulyov (KAZ)

== Bowling ==
| Athlete | Event | Block 1 | Block 2 | Total | Rank |
| Athlete | Event | Result | Result | Total | Rank |
|---|---|---|---|---|---|
| Chi Mengyu; Su Jun; Wang Hongbo | Men's trios | 1894 | 2070 | 3964 | 19 |
| Yang Liyan; Wang Xinlin; Zhang Chunli | Women's trios | 1857 | 1890 | 3747 | 16 |

== Boxing ==
Men

| Athlete | Event | Round of 32 | Round of 16 | Quarterfinals | Semifinals | Final | Rank |
| Athlete | Event | Opposition Result | Opposition Result | Opposition Result | Opposition Result | Opposition Result | Rank |
|---|---|---|---|---|---|---|---|
| Wu Zhonglin | –49 kg | Bye | W Yurachai (THA); W 5–0 | MB Kali (INA); W 5–0 | H Dusmatov (UZB); L 0–5 | Did not advance | 3rd place, bronze medalist(s) |
| Hu Jianguan | –52 kg | Trần VT (VIE); W 5–0 | J Latipov (UZB); L 2–3 | Did not advance | | | |
| Xu Boxiang | –56 kg | Bye | Lee Y-c (KOR); W 5–0 | Naqeebullah (PAK); W 5–0 | Jo H-n (PRK); WO | Did not advance | 3rd place, bronze medalist(s) |
| Shan Jun | –60 kg | Bye | S Thapa (IND); W RSC | S Toltayev (KAZ); W 5–0 | E Tsendbaatar (MGL); L 0–5 | Did not advance | 3rd place, bronze medalist(s) |
| Wang Gang | –64 kg | A Alves (TLS); W 5–0 | B Ibragimov (KAZ); L 0–5 | Did not advance | | | |
| Maimaititu Ersun Qiong | –69 kg | Bye | BU Baturov (UZB); L 1–4 | Did not advance | | | |
| Tuoheta Erbieke Tanglatihan | –75 kg | Bye | N Pazzyyev (TKM); W 4–1 | VK Yadav (IND); L 2–3 | Did not advance | | |

Women

| Athlete | Event | Round of 32 | Round of 16 | Quarterfinals | Semifinals | Final | Rank |
| Athlete | Event | Opposition Result | Opposition Result | Opposition Result | Opposition Result | Opposition Result | Rank |
|---|---|---|---|---|---|---|---|
| Chang Yuan | –51 kg | Bye | T Lhamo (BHU); W RSC | S Devi (IND); W 5–0 | Lin Y-t (TPE); W 4–1 | Pang C-m (PRK); W 3–2 | 1st place, gold medalist(s) |
| Yin Junhua | –57 kg | —N/a | N Petecio (PHI); W 3–2 | Im A-j (KOR); W 5–0 | N Techasuep (THA); W 5–0 | Jo S-h (PRK); W 4–1 | 1st place, gold medalist(s) |
| Yang Wenlu | –60 kg | —N/a | P Rawal (NEP); W 5–0 | Oh Y-j (KOR); L 2–3 | Did not advance | | |

== Canoeing ==
=== Slalom ===
| Athlete | Event | Heats | | Semifinal | | Final | |
| Athlete | Event | Best | Rank | Time | Rank | Time | Rank |
|---|---|---|---|---|---|---|---|
| Chen Fangjia | Men's C-1 | 88.04 | 1 Q | 92.50 | 1 Q | 90.58 | 2nd place, silver medalist(s) |
| Teng Zhiqiang | Men's C-1 | 90.03 | 3 Q | 92.92 | 4 | Did not advance | |
| Quan Xin | Men's K-1 | 81.26 | 1 Q | 84.12 | 1 Q | 89.39 | 1st place, gold medalist(s) |
| Zhu Haoran | Men's K-1 | 82.59 | 3 Q | 89.07 | 4 | Did not advance | |
| Chen Shi | Women's C-1 | 101.87 | 2 Q | 105.90 | 1 Q | 110.32 | 1st place, gold medalist(s) |
| Yang Jie | Women's C-1 | 98.30 | 1 Q | 110.70 | 2 | Did not advance | |
| Li Tong | Women's K-1 | 93.88 | 3 Q | 97.37 | 1 Q | 100.17 | 2nd place, silver medalist(s) |
| Ren Ye | Women's K-1 | 93.58 | 2 Q | 103.25 | 3 | Did not advance | |

=== Sprint ===
| Athlete | Event | Heats | | Semifinal | | Final | |
| Athlete | Event | Time | Rank | Time | Rank | Time | Rank |
|---|---|---|---|---|---|---|---|
| Zheng Pengfei | Men's C-1 1000 m | —N/a | | | | DNF | — |
| Xing Song; Li Qiang | Men's C-2 200 m | 38.473 | 1 QF | Bye | | 36.940 | 1st place, gold medalist(s) |
| Liu Hao; Wang Hao | Men's C-2 1000 m | —N/a | | | | 3:39.825 | 1st place, gold medalist(s) |
| Zhang Dong; Bu Tingkai | Men's K-2 1000 m | 3:28.074 | 1 QF | Bye | | 3:23.601 | 1st place, gold medalist(s) |
| Sun Mengya | Women's C-1 200 m | 51.309 | 3 QF | Bye | | 49.070 | 1st place, gold medalist(s) |
| Ma Yanan; Sun Mengya | Women's C-2 500 m | —N/a | | | | 2:02.512 | 1st place, gold medalist(s) |
| Li Yue | Women's K-1 200 m | 43.449 | 2 QF | Bye | | 42.507 | 2nd place, silver medalist(s) |
| Li Yue | Women's K-1 500 m | —N/a | | | | 1:59.468 | 1st place, gold medalist(s) |
| Li Yue; Zhou Yu | Women's K-2 500 m | —N/a | | | | 1:45.266 | 1st place, gold medalist(s) |
| Ma Qing; Zhou Yu; Yang Jiali; Huang Jieyi | Women's K-4 500 m | —N/a | | | | 1:33.896 | 1st place, gold medalist(s) |

Qualification legend: QF=Final; QS=Semifinal

=== Traditional boat race ===
Men

| Athlete | Event | Heats | | Repechage | | Semifinals | | Final | |
| Athlete | Event | Time | Rank | Time | Rank | Time | Rank | Time | Rank |
|---|---|---|---|---|---|---|---|---|---|
| Jiao Fangxu; Gao Jiawen; Cai Wenxuan; Liu Xuegang; Du Zhuan; Yin Zhonghai; Zhang Zhen; Zeng Delin; Chen Guangqin; Su Bopin; Li Shuai; Chen Juntong; Ling Wenwei; Feng Guojing; Li Guisen; Zhou Guichao | TBR 200 m | 51.170 | 1 SF | Bye | | 51.108 | 1 GF | 50.832 | 1st place, gold medalist(s) |
| Jiao Fangxu; Gao Jiawen; Cai Wenxuan; Liu Xuegang; Du Zhuan; Yin Zhonghai; Zhang Zhen; Zeng Delin; Chen Guangqin; Su Bopin; Li Shuai; Chen Juntong; Ling Wenwei; Feng Guojing; Li Guisen; Zhou Guichao | TBR 500 m | 2:17.410 | 1 SF | Bye | | 2:15.714 | 3 GF | 2:14.297 | 2nd place, silver medalist(s) |
| Jiao Fangxu; Gao Jiawen; Cai Wenxuan; Liu Xuegang; Du Zhuan; Yin Zhonghai; Zhang Zhen; Zeng Delin; Chen Guangqin; Su Bopin; Li Shuai; Chen Juntong; Ling Wenwei; Feng Guojing; Li Guisen; Zhou Guichao | TBR 1000 m | 4:41.664 | 1 SF | Bye | | 4:37.961 | 2 GF | 4:37.217 | 4 |

Women

| Athlete | Event | Heats | | Repechage | | Semifinals | | Final | |
| Athlete | Event | Time | Rank | Time | Rank | Time | Rank | Time | Rank |
|---|---|---|---|---|---|---|---|---|---|
| Peng Xiaojuan; Dong Aili; Chen Chen; Wang Jing; Wang Li; Xu Fengxue; Zhong Yuan; Chen Xue; Tang Shenglan; Song Yanbing; Liang Liping; Huang Yi; Hu Chen; Bai Ge; Pan Huizhu; Li Lianying | TBR 200 m | 55.996 | 1 SF | Bye | | 56.787 | 1 GF | 56.161 | 1st place, gold medalist(s) |
| Peng Xiaojuan; Dong Aili; Chen Chen; Wang Jing; Wang Li; Xu Fengxue; Zhong Yuan; Chen Xue; Tang Shenglan; Song Yanbing; Liang Liping; Huang Yi; Hu Chen; Bai Ge; Pan Huizhu; Li Lianying | TBR 500 m | 2:27.406 | 2 SF | Bye | | 2:29.482 | 2 GF | 2:25.092 | 2nd place, silver medalist(s) |

== Contract bridge ==
Men

| Athlete | Event | Qualification | | Semifinal | | Final | |
| Athlete | Event | Point | Rank | Point | Rank | Point | Rank |
|---|---|---|---|---|---|---|---|
| Yang Lixin; Chen Gang | Pair | 1767.9 | 1 Q | 1185.2 | 1 Q | 378 | 2nd place, silver medalist(s) |
| Ju Chuancheng; Shi Zhengjun | Pair | 1585.6 | 10 Q | 1122.8 | 2 Q | 364 | 6 |
| Zhuang Zejun; Shi Haojun | Pair | 1456.3 | 17 Q | 1117.4 | 3 Q | 359 | 7 |
| Chen Gang; Ju Chuancheng; Shi Haojun; Shi Zhengjun; Zhuang Zejun; Yang Lixin | Team | 172.59 | 2 Q | Hong Kong (HKG); L 103.67–127.00 | | Did not advance | 3rd place, bronze medalist(s) |

Women

| Athlete | Event | Qualification | | Semifinal | | Final | |
| Athlete | Event | Point | Rank | Point | Rank | Point | Rank |
|---|---|---|---|---|---|---|---|
| Huang Yan; Wang Nan | Pair | 908.9 | 4 Q | 784.9 | 2 Q | 378.2 | 3rd place, bronze medalist(s) |
| Ran Jingrong; Wu Shaohong | Pair | 907.8 | 6 Q | 811.1 | 1 Q | 408.7 | 1st place, gold medalist(s) |
| Lu Yan; Liu Yan | Pair | 904.3 | 7 Q | 699.9 | 14 | Did not advance | |

Mixed

| Athlete | Event | Qualification | | Semifinal | | Final | |
| Athlete | Event | Point | Rank | Point | Rank | Point | Rank |
|---|---|---|---|---|---|---|---|
| Hu Wen; Li Liang | Pair | 1295 | 5 Q | 732.6 | 7 Q | 327.5 | 8 |
| Zhu Aiping; Zhang Yizhuo | Pair | 1262.8 | 10 Q | 728.7 | 8 Q | 331 | 6 |
| Yang Jinghui; Xun Yonghong | Pair | 1170.2 | 19 | Did not advance | | | |
| Hu Wen; Yang Jinghui; Zhu Aiping; Li Liang; Xun Yonghong; Zhang Yizhuo | Team | 164.14 | 3 Q | Indonesia (INA); W 121–87 | | Thailand (THA); W 122.67–70 | 1st place, gold medalist(s) |
| Shen Qi; Wang Wenfei; Liu Jing; Hou Xu; Fu Zhong; Li Jie | Supermixed team | 116.44 | 2 Q | Indonesia (INA); W 137–60 | | Hong Kong (HKG); W 134–37.67 | 1st place, gold medalist(s) |

== Cycling ==
=== BMX ===
| Athlete | Event | Seeding run | | Motos | | Final | |
| Athlete | Event | Time | Rank | Point | Rank | Time | Rank |
|---|---|---|---|---|---|---|---|
| Li Xiaogang | Men's race | 37.21 | 7 | 13 | 4 Q | 43.752 | 8 |
| Sun Yue | Men's race | 37.29 | 8 | 12 | 4 Q | 36.094 | 4 |
| Lu Yan | Women's race | 38.82 | 2 | 3 | 1 Q | 1:17.451 | 7 |
| Zhang Yaru | Women's race | 41.18 | 4 | 5 | 2 Q | 39.643 | 1st place, gold medalist(s) |

=== Mountain biking ===
| Athlete | Event | Final | |
| Athlete | Event | Time | Rank |
|---|---|---|---|
| Lü Xianjing | Men's cross-country | 1:36:02 | 2nd place, silver medalist(s) |
| Ma Hao | Men's cross-country | 1:34:58 | 1st place, gold medalist(s) |
| Li Hongfeng | Women's cross-country | 1:24:56 | 2nd place, silver medalist(s) |
| Yao Bianwa | Women's cross-country | 1:20:17 | 1st place, gold medalist(s) |

=== Road ===
| Athlete | Event | Final | |
| Athlete | Event | Time | Rank |
|---|---|---|---|
| Bai Lijun | Men's road race | 3:36:12 | 47 |
| Liu Jiankun | Men's road race | 3:29:56 | 28 |
| Niu Yikui | Men's road race | 3:42:25 | 52 |
| Zhang Chunlong | Men's road race | 3:38:17 | 48 |
| Pu Yixian | Women's road race | 2:57:07 | 2nd place, silver medalist(s) |
| Sun Jiajun | Women's road race | 2:57:39 | 6 |
| Shi Hang | Men's time trial | 1:01:38.71 | 8 |
| Liang Hongyu | Women's time trial | 34:50.02 | 4 |

=== Track ===
Sprint

| Athlete | Event | Qualification | | Round of 32 | Round of 16 | Quarterfinals | Semifinals | Final | |
| Athlete | Event | Time | Rank | Opposition Time | Opposition Time | Opposition Time | Opposition Time | Opposition Time | Rank |
|---|---|---|---|---|---|---|---|---|---|
| Xu Chao | Men's sprint | 9.892 | 2 | Bye | P Admadi (INA); W 10.350 | SF Sahrom (MAS); L | Did not advance | | 5 |
| Zhou Yu | Men's sprint | 9.941 | 3 | Bye | S Ponomaryov (KAZ); W 10.470 | T Fukaya (JPN); L | Did not advance | | 6 |
| Lin Junhong | Women's sprint | 11.103 | 6 | —N/a | Chang Y (TPE); W 11.596 | Zhong TS (CHN); L | Did not advance | | 6 |
| Zhong Tianshi | Women's sprint | 10.840 | 3 | —N/a | W Luekajorn (THA); W 11.920 | Lin JH (CHN); W 11.887 | Lee H-j (KOR); L (FB) | Cho S-y (KOR); L | 4 |

Team sprint

| Athlete | Event | Qualification | | Final | |
| Athlete | Event | Time | Rank | Opposition Time | Rank |
|---|---|---|---|---|---|
| Li Jianxin; Xu Chao; Zhou Yu; Wang Tianqi^{b} | Men's team sprint | 43.996 | 2 FA | Malaysia (MAS); W 44.160 | 1st place, gold medalist(s) |
| Lin Junhong; Zhong Tianshi; Guo Yufang^{b} | Women's team sprint | 32.936 | 1 FA | Hong Kong (HKG); W 33.118 | 1st place, gold medalist(s) |

^{b} Riders who entered the competition but did not participating in any phase of the team event.
Qualification legend: FA=Gold medal final; FB=Bronze medal final

Pursuit

| Athlete | Event | Qualification | | Round 1 | | Final | |
| Athlete | Event | Time | Rank | Opposition Time | Rank | Opposition Time | Rank |
|---|---|---|---|---|---|---|---|
| Shen Pingan | Men's pursuit | 4:43.363 | 11 | —N/a | | Did not advance | |
| Wang Hong | Women's pursuit | 3:40.967 | 2 FA | —N/a | | Lee J-m (KOR); L | 2nd place, silver medalist(s) |
| Guo Liang; Qin Chenlu; Xue Chaohua; Shen Pingan; Hou Yake^{[b]} Jiang Zhihui^{[b]} | Men's team pursuit | 4:10.729 | 4 Q | South Korea (KOR); W 4:07.118 | 1 FA | Hong Kong (HKG); W 4:03.790 | 1st place, gold medalist(s) |
| Liu Jiali; Wang Xiaofei; Wang Hong; Chen Qiaolin; Jin Chenhong^{[a]} Ma Menglu^{[a]} | Women's team pursuit | 4:30.951 | 2 Q | Japan (JPN); W 4:31.317 | 1 FA | South Korea (KOR); L | 2nd place, silver medalist(s) |

^{a} Riders who participated in the heats only and received medals.
^{b} Riders who entered the competition but did not participating in any phase of the team event.
Qualification legend: FA=Gold medal final; FB=Bronze medal final

Keirin

| Athlete | Event | 1st Round | Repechage | 2nd Round | Final |
| Athlete | Event | Rank | Rank | Rank | Rank |
|---|---|---|---|---|---|
| Bi Wenjun | Men's keirin | 4 R | 2 Q | 6 FB | 8 |
| Xu Chao | Men's keirin | 1 Q | Bye | 3 FA | 6 |
| Lin Junhong | Women's keirin | 2 Q | Bye | 3 FA | 6 |
| Zhong Tianshi | Women's keirin | 2 Q | Bye | 2 FA | 3rd place, bronze medalist(s) |

Qualification legend: FA=Gold medal final; FB=Bronze medal final

Omnium

| Athlete | Event | Scratch race | | Tempo race | | Elimination race | | Points race | | Total points | Rank |
| Athlete | Event | Rank | Points | Rank | Points | Rank | Points | Rank | Points | Total points | Rank |
|---|---|---|---|---|---|---|---|---|---|---|---|
| Jiang Zhihui | Men's omnium | 10 | 22 | 3 | 36 | 7 | 28 | 2 | 16 | 102 | 5 |
| Wang Xiaofei | Women's omnium | 7 | 28 | 6 | 30 | 4 | 34 | 2 | 24 | 116 | 5 |

Madison

| Athlete | Event | Points | Laps | Rank |
|---|---|---|---|---|
| Guo Liang; Qin Chenlu | Men's madison | −9 | −20 | 6 |
| Liu Jiali; Wang Xiaofei | Women's madison | 31 | 0 | 3rd place, bronze medalist(s) |

== Diving ==
Men

| Athlete | Event | Preliminaries | | Final | |
| Athlete | Event | Points | Rank | Points | Rank |
|---|---|---|---|---|---|
| Liu Chengming | 1 m springboard | 439.05 | 1 Q | 432.85 | 2nd place, silver medalist(s) |
| Peng Jianfeng | 1 m springboard | 439.00 | 2 Q | 462.15 | 1st place, gold medalist(s) |
| Cao Yuan | 3 m springboard | 515.25 | 2 Q | 540.05 | 2nd place, silver medalist(s) |
| Xie Siyi | 3 m springboard | 521.25 | 1 Q | 560.80 | 1st place, gold medalist(s) |
| Qiu Bo | 10 m platform | 561.15 | 1 Q | 566.60 | 2nd place, silver medalist(s) |
| Yang Jian | 10 m platform | 532.10 | 2 Q | 579.10 | 1st place, gold medalist(s) |
| Cao Yuan; Xie Siyi | 3 m synchronized springboard | —N/a | | 479.52 | 1st place, gold medalist(s) |
| Chen Aisen; Yang Hao | 10 m synchronized platform | —N/a | | 466.47 | 1st place, gold medalist(s) |

Women

| Athlete | Event | Preliminaries | | Final | |
| Athlete | Event | Points | Rank | Points | Rank |
|---|---|---|---|---|---|
| Chen Yiwen | 1 m springboard | 305.30 | 2 Q | 306.50 | 2nd place, silver medalist(s) |
| Wang Han | 1 m springboard | 307.60 | 1 Q | 323.55 | 1st place, gold medalist(s) |
| Shi Tingmao | 3 m springboard | 384.90 | 1 Q | 389.40 | 1st place, gold medalist(s) |
| Wang Han | 3 m springboard | 372.95 | 2 Q | 383.40 | 2nd place, silver medalist(s) |
| Si Yajie | 10 m platform | 378.15 | 2 Q | 405.45 | 1st place, gold medalist(s) |
| Zhang Jiaqi | 10 m platform | 381.40 | 1 Q | 395.30 | 2nd place, silver medalist(s) |
| Chang Yani; Shi Tingmao | 3 m synchronized springboard | —N/a | | 335.70 | 1st place, gold medalist(s) |
| Zhang Jiaqi; Zhang Minjie | 10 m synchronized platform | —N/a | | 361.38 | 1st place, gold medalist(s) |

== Equestrian ==
Dressage

| Athlete | Horse | Event | Prix St-Georges | | Intermediate I | | Intermediate I Freestyle | |
| Athlete | Horse | Event | Score | Rank | Score | Rank | Score | Rank |
|---|---|---|---|---|---|---|---|---|
| Huang Zhuoqin | Domani | Individual | 65.764 | 16 Q | 64.440 | 20 Q | 66.500 | 14 |
| Gu Bing | Donni Brasco | Individual | 68.852 | 8 Q | 65.764 | 15 Q | 66.670 | 12 |

Eventing

| Athlete | Horse | Event | Dressage | | Cross-country | | | Jumping | | |
| Athlete | Horse | Event | Penalties | Rank | Penalties | Total | Rank | Penalties | Total | Rank |
|---|---|---|---|---|---|---|---|---|---|---|
| Alex Hua Tian | PSH Convivial | Individual | 27.10 | 3 | 0.00 | 27.10 | 3 Q | 0.00 | 27.10 | 3rd place, bronze medalist(s) |
| Ruiji Liang | Agora de Bordenave | Individual | 32.80 | 16 | 0.00 | 32.80 | 8 Q | 0.00 | 32.80 | 6 |
| Bate Qiaolun | Up de la Grange | Individual | 29.20 | 6 | Eliminated | | | Did not advance | | |
| Alex Hua Tian; Bate Qiaolun; Ruiji Liang | See above | Team | 89.10 | 3 | | 1,059.90 | 6 | | 1,059.90 | 4 |

== Esports (demonstration) ==
Arena of Valor and Clash Royale

| Athlete | ID | Event | Round 1 | Round 2 | Round 3 | Loser round 1 | Loser round 2 | Loser round 3 | Semifinal | Final | |
| Athlete | ID | Event | Opposition Score | Opposition Score | Opposition Score | Opposition Score | Opposition Score | Opposition Score | Opposition Score | Opposition Score | Rank |
|---|---|---|---|---|---|---|---|---|---|---|---|
| Zhang Yuchen; Liu Mingjie; Pan Jiadong; Wang Tianlong; Xiang Yang; Xie Tao | Lao Shuai; Ku; Chudong; Alan; Jieyue; MC | Arena of Valor | Thailand; W 2–0 | Chinese Taipei; W 2–0 | Vietnam; W 2–0 | Bye | | | | Chinese Taipei; W 2–0 | 1st place, gold medalist(s) |
| Huang Chenghui | Lciop | Clash Royale | Indonesia; L 1–3 | Did not advance | | Laos; W 3–1 | Hong Kong; W 3–0 | India; W 3–0 | Vietnam; W 3–2 | Indonesia; L 1–3 | 2nd place, silver medalist(s) |

League of Legends

| Athlete | ID | Event | Group stage | | Semifinals | Final / BM | |
| Athlete | ID | Event | Oppositions Scores | Rank | Opposition Score | Opposition Score | Rank |
|---|---|---|---|---|---|---|---|
| Yan Junze; Liu Shiyu; Su Hanwei; Jian Zihao; Tian Ye; Shi Senming | Letme; Mlxg xiye Uzi; Ming; Meiko | League of Legends | Kazakhstan: W 2–0; South Korea: L 0–2; Vietnam: W 2–0 | 2 Q | Chinese Taipei; W 2–1 | South Korea; W 3–1 | 1st place, gold medalist(s) |

== Fencing ==
Individual

| Athlete | Event | Preliminary | | Round of 32 | Round of 16 | Quarterfinals | Semifinals | Final | |
| Athlete | Event | Opposition Score | Rank | Opposition Score | Opposition Score | Opposition Score | Opposition Score | Opposition Score | Rank |
|---|---|---|---|---|---|---|---|---|---|
| Lan Minghao | Men's épée | A Al-Shatti (KUW): DNS; NA Bhatti (PAK): W 5–0; Jung J-s (KOR): L 4–5; F Alimov (UZB): W 5–1; M Al-Shamari (QAT): W 5–1; MR Mohamed (MAS): W 5–4 | 1 Q | Bye | R Kurbanov (KAZ); L 13–15 | Did not advance | | | 10 |
| Shi Gaofeng | Men's épée | Vag-Urminsky (CAM): W 5–3; Juengamnuaychai (THA): W 5–3; MR Tadi (IRI): W 5–2; M Al-Hammadi (UAE): W 5–3; E Dulguun (MGL): W 4–3; Park S-y (KOR): W 5–2 | 1 Q | Bye | K Baudunov (KGZ); W 15–9 | Park S-y (KOR); L 0–15 | Did not advance | | 5 |
| Huang Mengkai | Men's foil | Hoàng NH (VIE): W 5–1; JI Lim (SGP): L 4–5; T Shikine (JPN): L 3–5; C Theara (CAM): W 5–1; MP Bhatt (NEP): W 5–0 | 2 Q | Doungpatra (THA); W 15–3 | Ma JF (CHN); W 15–9 | KJ Chan (SGP); W 15–11 | Son Y-k (KOR); W 15–6 | N Choi (HKG); W 11–10 | 1st place, gold medalist(s) |
| Ma Jianfei | Men's foil | KJ Chan (SGP): W 5–3; Chen C-c (TPE): W 5–3; BW Louie (PHI): W 5–2; S Doungpatra (THA): W 5–0; Ha T-g (KOR): L 1–5 | 2 Q | Bye | Huang MK (CHN); L 9–15 | Did not advance | | | 10 |
| Wang Shi | Men's sabre | v Srinualnad (THA): W 5–2; Oh S-u (KOR): L 2–5; I Mokretsov (KAZ): W 5–3; H Budianto (INA): W 5–1 | 2 Q | Bye | S Kitsiriboon (THA); W 15–7 | Low HT (HKG); L 9–15 | Did not advance | | 5 |
| Xu Yingming | Men's sabre | N Al-Saadi (QAT): W 5–1; M Abedini (IRI): W 5–1; SA Putra (MAS): W 5–0; Low HT (HKG): L 2–5; Vũ TA (VIE): L 1–5 | 3 Q | Bye | M Abedini (IRI); L 6–15 | Did not advance | | | 9 |
| Sun Yiwen | Women's épée | KA Khamitova (KGZ): W 5–0; A Riyati (INA): W 5–2; C Lim (SGP): W 5–0; Goh BH (MAS): W 5–3; A Alibekova (KAZ): W 5–1 | 1 Q | Bye | A Alibekova (KAZ); W 15–8 | S Komata (JPN); W 15–5 | Choi I-j (KOR); W 11–10 | Kang Y-m (KOR); L 7–11 | 2nd place, silver medalist(s) |
| Zhu Mingye | Women's épée | VA Lim (SGP): W 5–2; W Takhamwong (THA): W 5–3; R Alshamma (UAE): W 5–0; K Hsieh (HKG): L 2–3; W Al-Bdulla (QAT): W 5–3 | 1 Q | Bye | Choi I-j (KOR); L 14–15 | Did not advance | | | 9 |
| Fu Yiting | Women's foil | K Miyawaki (JPN): W 5–0; Ho KU (MAC): W 5–0; SK Catantan (PHI): W 5–0; RA Jaoude (LBN): W 5–0; Thongchampa (THA): W 5–0 | 1 Q | Bye | KV Cheung (HKG); W 14–12 | Cheng H (TPE); W 14–7 | Liu YW (HKG); W 15–10 | Jeon H-s (KOR); L 3–8 | 2nd place, silver medalist(s) |
| Huo Xingxin | Women's foil | T Fong (MAS): W 5–0; M Ananda (INA): W 5–1; S Azuma (JPN): L 1–5; MI Esteban (PHI): W 5–4; A Berthier (SGP): L 3–5 | 3 Q | Bye | A Berthier (SGP); W 15–8 | Liu YW (HKG); L 8–15 | Did not advance | | 8 |
| Qian Jiarui | Women's sabre | Bùi TTH (VIE): W 5–2; N Tamura (JPN): W 5–3; Y Ariunzayaa (MGL): W 5–1; K Shreshta (NEP): W 5–1; Au SY (HKG): W 5–4 | 1 Q | Bye | FR Delcheh (IRI); W 15–13 | D Permatasari (INA); W 15–11 | Kim J-y (KOR); W 15–13 | Shao YQ (CHN); W 15–9 | 1st place, gold medalist(s) |
| Shao Yaqi | Women's sabre | K Chang (HKG): L 3–5; A Sarybay (KAZ): L 4–5; Y Lau (SGP): W 5–1; Ngernrungruangroj (THA): W 5–1 | 2 Q | Bye | Bùi TTH (VIE); W 15–14 | S Fukushima (JPN); W 15–12 | N Tamura (JPN); W 15–14 | Qian JR (CHN); L 9–15 | 2nd place, silver medalist(s) |

Team

| Athlete | Event | Round of 16 | Quarterfinals | Semifinals | Final | |
| Athlete | Event | Opposition Score | Opposition Score | Opposition Score | Opposition Score | Rank |
|---|---|---|---|---|---|---|
| Dong Chao; Lan Minghao; Shi Gaofeng; Xue Yangdong | Men's épée | Mongolia (MGL); W 45–24 | Vietnam (VIE); W 45–31 | South Korea (KOR); W 45–41 | Japan (JPN); L 22–30 | 2nd place, silver medalist(s) |
| Huang Mengkai; Li Chen; Ma Jianfei; Shi Jialuo | Men's foil | Bye | Chinese Taipei (TPE); W 45–31 | South Korea (KOR); L 43–45 | Did not advance | 3rd place, bronze medalist(s) |
| Lu Yang; Wang Shi; Xu Yingming; Yan Yinghui | Men's sabre | Bye | Japan (JPN); W 45–24 | Iran (IRI); L 43–45 | Did not advance | 3rd place, bronze medalist(s) |
| Lin Sheng; Sun Yiwen; Xu Chengzi; Zhu Mingye | Women's épée | Bye | India (IND); W 45–25 | Hong Kong (HKG); W 45–34 | South Korea (KOR); W 29–28 | 1st place, gold medalist(s) |
| Chen Qingyuan; Fu Yiting; Huo Xingxin; Shi Yue | Women's foil | Bye | Philippines (PHI); W 45–38 | Singapore (SGP); W 45–14 | Japan (JPN); L 34–35 | 2nd place, silver medalist(s) |
| Ma Yingjia; Qian Jiarui; Shao Yaqi; Yang Hengyu | Women's sabre | Bye | Thailand (THA); W 45–32 | Kazakhstan (KAZ); W 45–25 | South Korea (KOR); W 36–45 | 2nd place, silver medalist(s) |

== Field hockey ==
China participated in the field hockey event with their women's team that was entered in the pool A. The team advance to the semifinal stage, but was defeated by Indian team with the score 0–1. In the bronze medal match, the team dominate the game, and grabbed the bronze medal after beating South Korea with the score 2–1. Gu Bingfeng was awarded as the top scorer in the women's team event after amassed 13 goals.

Summary

| Team | Event | Group Stage | | | | | Semifinal | Final / BM | |
| Team | Event | Opposition Score | Opposition Score | Opposition Score | Opposition Score | Rank | Opposition Score | Opposition Score | Rank |
|---|---|---|---|---|---|---|---|---|---|
| China women's | Women's tournament | Chinese Taipei; W 9–0 | Malaysia; D 2–2 | Japan; L 2–4 | Hong Kong; W 15–0 | 2 Q | India; L 0–1 | South Korea; W 2–1 | 3rd place, bronze medalist(s) |

=== Women's tournament ===
Roster

The following is the China roster in the women's field hockey tournament of the 2018 Asian Games.

Head coach: (Germany) Jamilon Mülders

2. Gu Bingfeng
3. Song Xiaoming
5. Li Jiaqi
7. Cui Qiuxia (C)
8. Zhou Yu
10. Peng Yang
11. Liang Meiyu
13. Li Hong
15. Zhang Jinrong
16. Ou Zixia
19. Zhang Xiaoxue
20. He Jiangxin
22. Chen Yi (GK)
23. De Jiaojiao
25. Xi Xiayun
29. Chen Yi
30. Dan Wen
32. Ye Jiao (GK)

Pool A

| Pos | Team | Pld | W | D | L | PF | PA | PD | Pts | Qualification |
|---|---|---|---|---|---|---|---|---|---|---|
| 1 | Japan | 4 | 4 | 0 | 0 | 24 | 3 | +21 | 12 | Semifinals |
| 2 | China | 4 | 2 | 1 | 1 | 28 | 6 | +22 | 7 | Semifinals |
| 3 | Malaysia | 4 | 2 | 1 | 1 | 22 | 5 | +17 | 7 | 5th place game |
| 4 | Chinese Taipei | 4 | 1 | 0 | 3 | 3 | 33 | −30 | 3 | 7th place game |
| 5 | Hong Kong | 4 | 0 | 0 | 4 | 2 | 32 | −30 | 0 | 9th place game |

Source: FIH
Rules for classification: 1) points; 2) goal difference; 3) goals scored; 4) head-to-head result.

21 August 2018
16:00

| China | 9–0 | Chinese Taipei |
|---|---|---|
| Xi 9', 27'; Gu 30', 45'; Zhang X 36', 56'; Peng 50', 55'; Liang 54' | Report |

Umpires:
Junko Wagatsuma (JPN)
Dahiya Deepa (IND)

23 August 2018
18:00

| Malaysia | 2–2 | China |
|---|---|---|
| Onn 33', 44' | Report | Liang 10'; Gu 49' |

Umpires:
Kelly Hudson (NZL)
Kim Yoon-seon (KOR)

25 August 2018
18:00

| Japan | 4–2 | China |
|---|---|---|
| Shimizu 4', 8'; Oikawa 19'; Kato 26' | Report | Gu 12', 32' |

Umpires:
Kelly Hudson (NZL)
Kim Yoon-seon (KOR)

27 August 2018
18:00

| China | 15–0 | Hong Kong |
|---|---|---|
| Peng 15'; Ou 20', 41'; Xi 22', 29', 44'; Gu 30', 34', 35', 36', 37', 40', 46'; Liang 44'; Li 60' | Report |

Umpires:
Binish Hayat (PAK)
Dahiya Seepa (IND)

Semifinal

29 August 2018
20:00

| India | 1–0 | China |
|---|---|---|
| G. Kaur 52' | Report |

Umpires:
Chieko Soma (JPN)
Kim Yoon-seon (KOR)

Bronze medal game

31 August 2018
17:30

| South Korea | 1–2 | China |
|---|---|---|
| Kim O-j 60' | Report | Gu 20'; Song 58' |

Umpires:
Ayanna McClean (TTO)
Suzi Sutton (USA)

== Football ==
Summary

| Team | Event | Group Stage | | | | Round of 16 | Quarterfinal | Semifinal | Final / BM | |
| Team | Event | Opposition Score | Opposition Score | Opposition Score | Rank | Opposition Score | Opposition Score | Opposition Score | Opposition Score | Rank |
|---|---|---|---|---|---|---|---|---|---|---|
| China men's | Men's tournament | Timor-Leste; W 6–0 | Syria; W 3–0 | United Arab Emirates; W 2–1 | 1 Q | Saudi Arabia; L 3–4 | Did not advance | | | 9 |
| China women's | Women's tournament | Hong Kong; W 7–0 | Tajikistan; W 16–0 | North Korea; W 2–0 | 1 Q | —N/a | Thailand; W 5–0 | Chinese Taipei; W 1–0 | Japan; L 0–1 | 2nd place, silver medalist(s) |

=== Men's tournament ===
Team roster

The following is the China squad in the men's football tournament of the 2018 Asian Games. The final squad was announced on 10 August.

Head coach: (Italy) Massimiliano Maddaloni

| No. | Pos. | Player | Date of birth (age) | Caps | Goals | Club |
|---|---|---|---|---|---|---|
| 1 | GK | Chen Wei | 14 February 1998 (aged 20) | 6 | 0 | (Chinese Football Association) Shanghai SIPG |
| 2 | DF | Li Hailong | 2 August 1996 (aged 22) | 8 | 0 | (Chinese Football Association) Shandong Luneng |
| 3 | MF | Chen Zhechao | 19 April 1995 (aged 23) | 22 | 1 | (Chinese Football Association) Shandong Luneng |
| 4 | DF | Liu Yang | 17 June 1995 (aged 23) | 11 | 1 | (Chinese Football Association) Shandong Luneng |
| 5 | DF | Gao Zhunyi | 21 August 1995 (aged 22) | 21 | 5 | (Chinese Football Association) Hebei China Fortune |
| 6 | MF | Yao Junsheng | 29 October 1995 (aged 22) | 24 | 9 | (Chinese Football Association) Shandong Luneng |
| 7 | MF | Wei Shihao | 8 April 1995 (aged 23) | 19 | 4 | (Chinese Football Association) Beijing Guoan |
| 8 | MF | He Chao (captain) | 19 April 1995 (aged 23) | 23 | 1 | (Chinese Football Association) Changchun Yatai |
| 9 | FW | Zhang Yuning | 5 January 1997 (aged 21) | 17 | 7 | (Royal Dutch Football Association) ADO Den Haag |
| 10 | MF | Tang Shi | 24 January 1995 (aged 23) | 21 | 4 | (Chinese Football Association) Guangzhou Evergrande |
| 11 | MF | Chen Binbin | 10 June 1998 (aged 20) | 5 | 0 | (Chinese Football Association) Shanghai SIPG |
| 12 | GK | Zhou Yuchen | 12 January 1995 (aged 23) | 20 | 0 | (Chinese Football Association) Shandong Luneng |
| 13 | FW | Huang Zichang | 4 April 1997 (aged 21) | 5 | 2 | (Chinese Football Association) Jiangsu Suning |
| 14 | DF | Long Cheng | 22 March 1995 (aged 23) | 9 | 0 | (Chinese Football Association) Henan Jianye |
| 15 | MF | Zhang Yuan | 28 January 1997 (aged 21) | 7 | 1 | (Chinese Football Association) Guizhou Hengfeng |
| 16 | FW | Feng Boyuan | 18 January 1995 (aged 23) | 6 | 1 | (Chinese Football Association) Liaoning |
| 17 | DF | Xu Yougang | 9 February 1996 (aged 22) | 3 | 0 | (Chinese Football Association) Shanghai Shenhua |
| 18 | MF | Cao Yongjing | 15 February 1997 (aged 21) | 9 | 1 | (Chinese Football Association) Beijing Renhe |
| 19 | DF | Liu Yiming | 28 February 1995 (aged 23) | 18 | 1 | (Chinese Football Association) Tianjin Quanjian |
| 20 | DF | Deng Hanwen | 8 January 1995 (aged 23) | 18 | 1 | (Chinese Football Association) Guangzhou Evergrande |

* Over-aged player.

Group stage

| Pos | Team | Pld | W | D | L | GF | GA | GD | Pts | Qualification |
|---|---|---|---|---|---|---|---|---|---|---|
| 1 | China | 3 | 3 | 0 | 0 | 11 | 1 | +10 | 9 | Advance to knockout stage |
| 2 | Syria | 3 | 2 | 0 | 1 | 6 | 5 | +1 | 6 | Advance to knockout stage |
| 3 | United Arab Emirates | 3 | 1 | 0 | 2 | 5 | 4 | +1 | 3 | Advance to knockout stage |
| 4 | East Timor | 3 | 0 | 0 | 3 | 3 | 15 | −12 | 0 | |
| 5 | Iraq | 0 | 0 | 0 | 0 | 0 | 0 | 0 | 0 | Withdrew, replaced by UAE |

Source: Asian Games 2018
Rules for classification: Group stage tiebreakers
14 August 2018
16:00 UTC+7

| China | 6–0 | East Timor |
|---|---|---|
| Zhang Yuning 4'; Zhang Yuan 20'; Gao Zhunyi 27', 47'; Wei Shihao 33'; Yao Junsheng 36' | Report |

Jalak Harupat Stadium, Soreang
Referee: Çarymyrat Kurbanow (Turkmenistan)

16 August 2018
19:00 UTC+7

| Syria | 0–3 | China |
|---|---|---|
| | Report | Wei Shihao 40'; Zhang Yuning 45+2'; Chen Binbin 66' |

Jalak Harupat Stadium, Soreang
Referee: Shaun Evans (Australia)

19 August 2018
19:00 UTC+7

| United Arab Emirates | 1–2 | China |
|---|---|---|
| Khalvan 32' | Report | Wei Shihao 38'; Yao Junsheng 71' |

Jalak Harupat Stadium, Soreang
Referee: Timur Faizullin (Kyrgyzstan)

Round of 16

24 August 2018
16:00 UTC+7

| China | 3–4 | Saudi Arabia |
|---|---|---|
| Yao Junsheng 80'; Huang Zichang 88'; Wei Shihao 90+5' | Report | Camara 16', 33', 60'; Al-Selouli 29' |

Patriot Candrabhaga Stadium, Bekasi
Referee: Kim Dae-yong (South Korea)

=== Women's tournament ===
Team roster

The following is the China squad in the women's football tournament of the 2018 Asian Games. The team of 20 players was officially named on 10 August.

Head coach: (China) Jia Xiuquan

| No. | Pos. | Player | Date of birth (age) | Club |
|---|---|---|---|---|
| 1 | GK | Zhao Lina | 18 September 1991 (aged 26) | (Chinese Football Association) Shanghai |
| 19 | GK | Bi Xiaolin | 18 September 1989 (aged 28) | (Chinese Football Association) Dalian Quanjian |
| 2 | DF | Han Peng | 20 December 1989 (aged 28) | (Chinese Football Association) Changchun |
| 3 | DF | Huang Yini | 20 January 1993 (aged 25) | (Chinese Football Association) Shanghai |
| 4 | DF | Lou Jiahui | 26 May 1991 (aged 27) | (Chinese Football Association) Henan Huishang |
| 5 | DF | Wu Haiyan (captain) | 26 February 1993 (aged 25) | (Chinese Football Association) Wuhan |
| 6 | DF | Lin Yuping | 28 February 1992 (aged 26) | (Chinese Football Association) Wuhan |
| 8 | DF | Li Jiayue | 8 June 1990 (aged 28) | (Chinese Football Association) Shanghai |
| 14 | DF | Zhao Rong | 2 August 1991 (aged 27) | (Chinese Football Association) Beijing Phoenix |
| 18 | DF | Li Mengwen | 28 March 1995 (aged 23) | (Chinese Football Association) Jiangsu Suning |
| 7 | MF | Wang Shuang | 23 January 1995 (aged 23) | (French Football Federation) Paris Saint-Germain |
| 9 | MF | Ren Guixin | 19 December 1988 (aged 29) | (Chinese Football Association) Changchun |
| 12 | MF | Wang Yan | 22 August 1991 (aged 26) | (Chinese Football Association) Dalian Quanjian |
| 13 | MF | Li Tingting | 3 April 1995 (aged 23) | (Chinese Football Association) Shandong |
| 16 | MF | Yang Lina | 13 April 1994 (aged 24) | (Chinese Football Association) Shanghai |
| 17 | MF | Gu Yasha | 28 November 1990 (aged 27) | (Chinese Football Association) Beijing Phoenix |
| 20 | MF | Zhang Rui | 17 January 1989 (aged 29) | (Chinese Football Association) Changchun |
| 10 | FW | Li Ying | 7 January 1993 (aged 25) | (Chinese Football Association) Shandong |
| 11 | FW | Wang Shanshan | 27 January 1990 (aged 28) | (Chinese Football Association) Dalian Quanjian |
| 15 | FW | Xiao Yuyi | 10 January 1996 (aged 22) | (Chinese Football Association) Shanghai |

Group stage

| Pos | Team | Pld | W | D | L | GF | GA | GD | Pts | Qualification |
|---|---|---|---|---|---|---|---|---|---|---|
| 1 | China | 3 | 3 | 0 | 0 | 25 | 0 | +25 | 9 | Advance to Knockout stage |
| 2 | North Korea | 3 | 2 | 0 | 1 | 24 | 2 | +22 | 6 | Advance to Knockout stage |
| 3 | Hong Kong | 3 | 1 | 0 | 2 | 6 | 16 | −10 | 3 | Advance to Knockout stage |
| 4 | Tajikistan | 3 | 0 | 0 | 3 | 1 | 38 | −37 | 0 | |

Source: Asian Games 2018
Rules for classification: Group stage tiebreakers
17 August 2018
18:30 UTC+7

| China | 7–0 | Hong Kong |
|---|---|---|
| Wang Shuang 7' (pen.); Wang Shanshan 20'; Li Ying 28'; Li Jiayue 42'; Chan Wing Sze 48' (o.g.); Gu Yasha 51', 72' | Report |

Gelora Sriwijaya Stadium, Palembang
Referee: Oh Hyeon-jeong (South Korea)

20 August 2018
18:30 UTC+7

| Tajikistan | 0–16 | China |
|---|---|---|
| | Report | Zhao Rong 3', 19', 47', 59', 90'; Li Tingting 4'; Wang Shuang 51'; Wang Shanshan 64', 73', 81', 83', 87', 88', 90+1', 90+2', 90+3' |

Gelora Sriwijaya Stadium, Palembang
Referee: Bui Thi Thu Trang (Vietnam)

22 August 2018
18:30 UTC+7

| North Korea | 0–2 | China |
|---|---|---|
| | Report | Wang Shuang 8'; Wang Shanshan 50' |

Gelora Sriwijaya Stadium, Palembang
Referee: Rebecca Durcau (Australia)

Quarterfinal

25 August 2018
19:30 UTC+7

| China | 5–0 | Thailand |
|---|---|---|
| Wang Shuang 32', 84', 90+1'; Xiao Yuyi 65'; Gu Yasha 85' | Report |

Gelora Sriwijaya Stadium, Palembang
Referee: Anna Sidorova (Uzbekistan)

Semi-final

28 August 2018
19:30 UTC+7

| Chinese Taipei | 0–1 | China |
|---|---|---|
| | Report | Wang Shanshan 51' |

Gelora Sriwijaya Stadium, Palembang
Referee: Thein Thein Aye (Myanmar)

Gold medal match

31 August 2018
18:30 UTC+7

| Japan | 1–0 | China |
|---|---|---|
| Sugasawa 90' | Report |

Gelora Sriwijaya Stadium, Palembang
Referee: Oh Hyeon-jeong (South Korea)

== Golf ==
Men

| Athlete | Event | Round 1 | Round 2 | Round 3 | Round 4 | Total | | |
| Athlete | Event | Score | Score | Score | Score | Score | Par | Rank |
|---|---|---|---|---|---|---|---|---|
| Jin Cheng | Individual | 70 | 72 | 67 | 70 | 279 | −9 | 3rd place, bronze medalist(s) |
| Chen Yilong | Individual | 75 | 75 | 68 | 71 | 289 | +1 | 23 |
| Zhang Huachuang | Individual | 72 | 73 | 73 | 68 | 286 | –2 | 13 |
| Yuan Yechun | Individual | 76 | 72 | 65 | 72 | 285 | −3 | 10 |
| Jin Cheng; Chen Yilong; Zhang Huachuang; Yuan Yechun | Team | 217 | 217 | 200 | 209 | 843 | –21 | 2nd place, silver medalist(s) |

Women

| Athlete | Event | Round 1 | Round 2 | Round 3 | Round 4 | Total | | |
| Athlete | Event | Score | Score | Score | Score | Score | Par | Rank |
|---|---|---|---|---|---|---|---|---|
| Liu Wenbo | Individual | 69 | 69 | 67 | 73 | 278 | −10 | 2nd place, silver medalist(s) |
| Du Mohan | Individual | 69 | 66 | 73 | 74 | 282 | −6 | 8 |
| Yin Ruoning | Individual | 76 | 73 | 75 | 72 | 296 | +8 | 26 |
| Liu Wenbo; Du Mohan; Yin Ruoning | Team | 138 | 135 | 140 | 145 | 558 | −18 | 3rd place, bronze medalist(s) |

== Handball ==
China joined in group A at the women's team event.

Summary

Key:

- ET – After extra time
- P – Match decided by penalty-shootout.

| Team | Event | Preliminary | Standing | Semifinals / Pl. | Final / BM / Pl. | |
| Team | Event | Opposition Score | Standing | Opposition Score | Opposition Score | Rank |
|---|---|---|---|---|---|---|
| China women's | Women's tournament | Group A Kazakhstan: L 26−27; India: W 36−21; South Korea: L 24−33; North Korea: W 34−31 | 2 Q | Japan; W 32−31 | South Korea; L 23−29 | 2nd place, silver medalist(s) |

=== Women's tournament ===
Roster

- Lin Yanqun
- Zhang Haixia
- Li Xiaoqing
- Wu Yin
- Wu Nana
- Yu Yuanyuan
- Wang Haiye
- Si Wen
- Liu Xiaomei
- Sha Zhengwen
- Yang Jiao
- Zhao Jiaqin
- Yang Yurou
- Li Yao
- Qiao Ru
- Lan Xiaoling

Group A

| Pos | Team | Pld | W | D | L | GF | GA | GD | Pts | Qualification |
|---|---|---|---|---|---|---|---|---|---|---|
| 1 | South Korea | 4 | 4 | 0 | 0 | 151 | 86 | +65 | 8 | Semifinals |
| 2 | China | 4 | 2 | 0 | 2 | 120 | 112 | +8 | 4 (Note: Tied on head-to-head points (2). Head-to-head goal difference: CHN +2, PRK +1, KAZ −3.) | Semifinals |
| 3 | North Korea | 4 | 2 | 0 | 2 | 139 | 125 | +14 | 4 | Classification 5th–8th |
| 4 | Kazakhstan | 4 | 2 | 0 | 2 | 118 | 116 | +2 | 4 | Classification 5th–8th |
| 5 | India | 4 | 0 | 0 | 4 | 77 | 166 | −89 | 0 | Classification 9th–10th |

Source: AHF
Notes:

| 16 August; 18:00 | China | 26–27 | Kazakhstan | POPKI Sports Hall, Jakarta; Referees: Hizaki, Ikebuchi (JPN) |
| 16 August; 18:00 | Li Y. 6 | (11–11) | Abilda 7 | POPKI Sports Hall, Jakarta; Referees: Hizaki, Ikebuchi (JPN) |
| 16 August; 18:00 | 1× (yellow card) 8× (suspension) | | 5× (suspension) | POPKI Sports Hall, Jakarta; Referees: Hizaki, Ikebuchi (JPN) |

| 19 August; 16:00 | India | 21–36 | China | POPKI Sports Hall, Jakarta; Referees: Al-Saqer, Al-Suqufi (KSA) |
| 19 August; 16:00 | Kaur 10 | (9–19) | Zhang 7 | POPKI Sports Hall, Jakarta; Referees: Al-Saqer, Al-Suqufi (KSA) |
| 19 August; 16:00 | 3× (yellow card) 2× (suspension) | | 2× (yellow card) 4× (suspension) | POPKI Sports Hall, Jakarta; Referees: Al-Saqer, Al-Suqufi (KSA) |

| 21 August; 18:00 | China | 24–33 | South Korea | POPKI Sports Hall, Jakarta; Referees: Al-Wahibi, Al-Shahi (OMA) |
| 21 August; 18:00 | Liu 5 | (11–14) | Jung Y. 8 | POPKI Sports Hall, Jakarta; Referees: Al-Wahibi, Al-Shahi (OMA) |
| 21 August; 18:00 | 3× (yellow card) 1× (suspension) | | 3× (yellow card) 1× (suspension) | POPKI Sports Hall, Jakarta; Referees: Al-Wahibi, Al-Shahi (OMA) |

| 23 August; 14:00 | North Korea | 31–34 | China | POPKI Sports Hall, Jakarta; Referees: Ota, Shimajiri (JPN) |
| 23 August; 14:00 | Choe C. 8 | (14–17) | Liu 13 | POPKI Sports Hall, Jakarta; Referees: Ota, Shimajiri (JPN) |
| 23 August; 14:00 | 2× (yellow card) 3× (suspension) | | 1× (yellow card) 2× (suspension) | POPKI Sports Hall, Jakarta; Referees: Ota, Shimajiri (JPN) |

Semifinal

| 27 August; 16:00 | Japan | 31–32 | China | POPKI Sports Hall, Jakarta; Referees: Al-Wahibi, Al-Shahi (OMA) |
| 27 August; 16:00 | Yokoshima, Akiyama 6 | (15–13) | Liu 11 | POPKI Sports Hall, Jakarta; Referees: Al-Wahibi, Al-Shahi (OMA) |
| 27 August; 16:00 | 2× (yellow card) 2× (suspension) | | 2× (yellow card) | POPKI Sports Hall, Jakarta; Referees: Al-Wahibi, Al-Shahi (OMA) |

Gold medal game

| 30 August; 18:00 | South Korea | 29–23 | China | POPKI Sports Hall, Jakarta; Referees: Ota, Shimajiri (JPN) |
| 30 August; 18:00 | Jung Y. 8 | (12–9) | Liu 10 | POPKI Sports Hall, Jakarta; Referees: Ota, Shimajiri (JPN) |
| 30 August; 18:00 | 2× (yellow card) | | 3× (yellow card) 2× (suspension) | POPKI Sports Hall, Jakarta; Referees: Ota, Shimajiri (JPN) |

== Jet ski ==
| Athlete | Event | Moto Points | | | | Total | Rank |
| Athlete | Event | 1 | 2 | 3 | 4 | Total | Rank |
|---|---|---|---|---|---|---|---|
| Wang Xiaomei | Runabout limited | DNR | | | | 0 | – |
| Wang Xiaomei | Ski modified | 48 | 39 | 33 | 33 | 153 | 6 |
| Wu Ronghua | Runabout limited | 43 | 43 | 33 | 60 | 179 | 4 |

== Ju-jitsu ==
China entered the ju-jitsu competition with 2 athletes (1 men's and 1 women's), but the athletes were disqualified.

Key:

- ADV – Won by advantages.
- RDC – Won by referee decision.
- SUB – Won by submission.

Men

| Athlete | Event | Round of 32 | Round of 16 | Quarterfinals | Semifinals | Repechage | Final / BM | Rank |
| Athlete | Event | Opposition Result | Opposition Result | Opposition Result | Opposition Result | Opposition Result | Opposition Result | Rank |
|---|---|---|---|---|---|---|---|---|
| Liu Hsungkang | –56 kg | A Bekishov (KGZ); DSQ | Did not advance | | | | | |

Women

| Athlete | Event | Round of 32 | Round of 16 | Quarterfinals | Semifinals | Repechage | Final / BM | Rank |
| Athlete | Event | Opposition Result | Opposition Result | Opposition Result | Opposition Result | Opposition Result | Opposition Result | Rank |
|---|---|---|---|---|---|---|---|---|
| La Yiwen | –49 kg | Bye | J Khan (CAM); DSQ | Did not advance | | | | |

== Judo ==
Key:

- 1st number — Ippon
- 2nd number — Waza-ari
- s — Shido

Men

| Athlete | Event | Round of 32 | Round of 16 | Quarterfinals | Semifinals | Repechage | Final / BM | Rank |
| Athlete | Event | Opposition Result | Opposition Result | Opposition Result | Opposition Result | Opposition Result | Opposition Result | Rank |
|---|---|---|---|---|---|---|---|---|
| Shang Yi | –60 kg | Bye | S Boqiev (TJK); W 01–00 | T Shishime (JPN); L 00s2–10 | Did not advance | Y Smetov (KAZ); W 10–00 | Lee H-r (KOR); L 00s1–01s1 | – |
| Wu Zhiqiang | –66 kg | M Kossekov (TKM); W 10–00s3 | J Maruyama (JPN); L 00–10 | Did not advance | | | | |
| Qing Daga | –73 kg | I Apriyadi (INA); W 01–00s1 | S Ono (JPN); L 00–10 | Did not advance | | | | |
| Gao Haiyuan | –81 kg | C Xayasan (LAO); W 10–00 | Chang W-c (TPE); W 01s1–00 | S Mollaei (IRI); L 00s2–10s1 | Did not advance | V Zoloev (KGZ); L 00–11s1 | Did not advance | |
| Bu Hebilige | –90 kg | Bye | N Elias (LBN); L 00s1–01 | Did not advance | | | | |
| Li Huilin | –100 kg | Bye | K Iida (JPN); L 00–10 | Did not advance | | | | |
| Yin Yongjie | +100 kg | —N/a | T Pramandita (INA); W 10s1–00s1 | Kim S-m (KOR); L 00–10 | Did not advance | B Oltiboev (UZB); L 00–11 | Did not advance | |

Women

| Athlete | Event | Round of 32 | Round of 16 | Quarterfinals | Semifinals | Repechage | Final / BM | Rank |
| Athlete | Event | Opposition Result | Opposition Result | Opposition Result | Opposition Result | Opposition Result | Opposition Result | Rank |
|---|---|---|---|---|---|---|---|---|
| Xiong Yao | –48 kg | —N/a | Wong KL (MAC); W 10–00 | Jeong B-k (KOR); L 00s1–10 | Did not advance | Gao J-y (TPE); W 10–00s1 | G Otgontsetseg (KAZ); L 00s1–10 | – |
| Wang Xin | –52 kg | Bye | K Warasiha (THA); L 00–10 | Did not advance | | | | |
| Lu Tongjuan | –57 kg | Bye | M Azizi (IRI); W 10–00s1 | Lien C-l (TPE); W 01–00s1 | M Tamaoki (JPN); L 00–10 | Bye | D Sumiyaa (MGL); L 00s2–01s1 | – |
| Tang Jing | –63 kg | —N/a | Ri P-h (PRK); W 01s2–00s2 | Han H-j (KOR); W 10–00s1 | N Nabekura (THA); L 00–10 | Bye | Chen Y-t (TPE); W 10–00 | 3rd place, bronze medalist(s) |
| Zhu Ya | –70 kg | —N/a | D Aghaei (IRI); W 10s1–00 | S Niizoe (JPN); L 00–10 | Did not advance | Kwon S-y (PRK); W 01–00s1 | G Matniyazova (UZB); L 00–10s1 | – |
| Ma Zhenzhao | –78 kg | —N/a | Bye | I Oeda (THA); W 10s1–00 | R Sato (JPN); L 00s3–10 | Bye | Z Raifova (KAZ); W 10–00 | 3rd place, bronze medalist(s) |
| Wang Yan | +78 kg | —N/a | Bye | B Mönkhtuyaa (MGL); W 01s1–00s2 | Kim M-j (KOR); L 00s1–10 | Bye | Tsai J-w (TPE); W 10–00s1 | 3rd place, bronze medalist(s) |

Mixed

| Athlete | Event | Round of 16 | Quarterfinals | Semifinals | Repechage | Final / BM | Rank |
| Athlete | Event | Opposition Result | Opposition Result | Opposition Result | Opposition Result | Opposition Result | Rank |
|---|---|---|---|---|---|---|---|
| Bayand Delihei; Bu Hebilige; Qing Daga; Qiu Shangao; Xie Yadong; Feng Xuemei; Jiang Yanan; Wang Yan; Zhang Wen; Zhu Ya | Team | Bye | Mongolia (MGL); W 4–2 | Japan (JPN); L 0–4 | Bye | India (IND); W 4–0 | 3rd place, bronze medalist(s) |

== Karate ==
China entered the karate competition with 8 athletes (4 men's and 4 women's).

== Modern pentathlon ==
Chinese Modern Pentathlon Association announced four pentathletes (2 men's and 2 women's) who competed at the Games.

| Athlete | Event | Swimming (200 m freestyle) | | Fencing (épée one touch) | | Riding (show jumping) | | Laser-run (shooting 10 m air pistol/ running 3200 m) | | Total points | Final rank |
| Athlete | Event | Rank | MP points | Rank | MP points | Rank | MP points | Rank | MP points | Total points | Final rank |
|---|---|---|---|---|---|---|---|---|---|---|---|
| Li Shuhuan | Men's | 8 | 298 | 5 | 219 | 2 | 300 | 3 | 636 | 1453 | 4 |
| Luo Shuai | Men's | 7 | 298 | 7 | 202 | 1 | 300 | 1 | 655 | 1455 | 3rd place, bronze medalist(s) |
| Bian Yufei | Women's | 1 | 291 | 9 | 194 | 8 | 209 | 4 | 534 | 1228 | 6 |
| Zhang Mingyu | Women's | 3 | 290 | 1 | 274 | 2 | 300 | 7 | 511 | 1375 | 1st place, gold medalist(s) |

== Paragliding ==
Men

| Athlete | Event | Round | | | | | | | | | | Total | Rank |
| Athlete | Event | 1 | 2 | 3 | 4 | 5 | 6 | 7 | 8 | 9 | 10 | Total | Rank |
|---|---|---|---|---|---|---|---|---|---|---|---|---|---|
| Wang Jianwei | Individual accuracy | 153 | 425 | 2 | 3 | 15 | 92 | ~~500~~ | 500 | 500 | 500 | 2190 | 28 |
| Xiong Gang | Individual accuracy | 21 | 122 | 9 | 2 | 218 | ~~500~~ | 4 | 3 | 2 | 6 | 387 | 9 |
| Ma Lei; Wang Hongji; Wang Jianwei; Wu Yong; Xiong Gang | Team accuracy | 189 | 560 | 25 | 31 | 737 | 890 | —N/a | | | | 2432 | 5 |
| Ma Lei; Wang Hongji; Wang Jianwei; Wu Yong; Xiong Gang | Cross-country | 348 | 536 | 476 | 324 | 0 | —N/a | | | | | 1684 | 8 |

Women

| Athlete | Event | Round | | | | | | | | | | Total | Rank |
| Athlete | Event | 1 | 2 | 3 | 4 | 5 | 6 | 7 | 8 | 9 | 10 | Total | Rank |
|---|---|---|---|---|---|---|---|---|---|---|---|---|---|
| Li Chennan | Individual accuracy | ~~500~~ | 500 | 252 | 55 | 111 | 500 | 488 | 2 | 59 | 1 | 1968 | 10 |
| Long Jingwen | Individual accuracy | ~~500~~ | 500 | 2 | 419 | 5 | 0 | 2 | 2 | 2 | 500 | 1432 | 7 |
| Li Chennan; Li Simin; Long Jingwen | Team accuracy | 1500 | 1004 | 255 | 974 | 173 | 505 | —N/a | | | | 4411 | 4 |
| Li Chennan; Li Simin; Long Jingwen | Cross-country | 0 | 0 | 0 | 0 | 0 | —N/a | | | | | 0 | 10 |

== Roller sports ==
=== Skateboarding ===
| Athlete | Event | Preliminary | | Final | |
| Athlete | Event | Result | Rank | Result | Rank |
|---|---|---|---|---|---|
| Sun Kunkun | Men's park | 60.66 | 5 Q | 60.00 | 5 |
| Xiang Xiaojun | Men's park | 51.33 | 8 Q | 41.00 | 7 |
| Gao Qunxiang | Men's street | 25.5 | 4 Q | 15.7 | 8 |
| Xiang Xiaojun | Men's street | 14.8 | 14 | Did not advance | |
| Lou Jiayi | Women's park | —N/a | | 37.00 | 5 |
| Zhang Xin | Women's park | —N/a | | 44.00 | 3rd place, bronze medalist(s) |
| Hui Zixuan | Women's street | —N/a | | 15.1 | 5 |
| Zeng Wenhui | Women's street | —N/a | | 15.9 | 4 |

=== Speed skating ===
| Athlete | Event | Final | |
| Athlete | Event | Time | Rank |
|---|---|---|---|
| Chen Tao | Men's road 20 km race | 33:52.570 | 5 |
| Tong Jiajun | Men's road 20 km race | 33:52.792 | 6 |
| Guo Dan | Women's road 20 km race | 44:50.992 | 2nd place, silver medalist(s) |
| Fang Huiyan | Women's road 20 km race | 44:51.646 | 4 |

== Rowing ==
Men

| Athlete | Event | Heats | | Repechage | | Final | |
| Athlete | Event | Time | Rank | Time | Rank | Time | Rank |
|---|---|---|---|---|---|---|---|
| Zhang Liang | Single sculls | 7:51.99 | 1 FA | Bye | | 7:25.36 | 1st place, gold medalist(s) |
| Zhang Zhiyuan; Chen Sensen | Double sculls | 7:18.09 | 3 R | 6:59.74 | 1 FA | 6:48.65 | 2nd place, silver medalist(s) |
| Li Xiaoxiong; Zhao Jingbin | Coxless pair | 7:30.14 | 1 FA | —N/a | | 7:04.07 | 1st place, gold medalist(s) |
| Xiong Xiong; Lü Fanpu; Zhao Chao; Zhou Xuewu | Lightweight coxless four | 6:45.68 | 1 FA | Bye | | 6:28.07 | 1st place, gold medalist(s) |

Women

| Athlete | Event | Heats | | Repechage | | Final | |
| Athlete | Event | Time | Rank | Time | Rank | Time | Rank |
|---|---|---|---|---|---|---|---|
| Chen Yunxia | Single sculls | 8:40.66 | 1 FA | Bye | | 8:08.21 | 1st place, gold medalist(s) |
| Jiang Yan; Li Jingjing | Double sculls | 7:51.04 | 1 FA | —N/a | | 7:33.55 | 1st place, gold medalist(s) |
| Ju Rui; Lin Xinyu | Coxless pair | 8:15.40 | 1 FA | Bye | | 7:55.50 | 1st place, gold medalist(s) |
| Yi Liqin; Guo Linlin; Zhang Min; Wang Fei | Coxless four | 7:12.38 | 1 FA | Bye | | 7:05.50 | 1st place, gold medalist(s) |
| Pan Dandan | Lightweight single sculls | 8:09.07 | 1 FA | —N/a | | 8:05.79 | 1st place, gold medalist(s) |
| Liang Guoru; Wu Qiang | Lightweight double sculls | 7:42.83 | 1 FA | —N/a | | 7:40.24 | 1st place, gold medalist(s) |

== Rugby sevens ==
China rugby sevens men's and women's team drawn in group A respectively. China women's team was a champion in the last edition in 2014 Incheon.

| Team | Event | Group Stage | | | | Quarterfinal | Semifinal / Pl. | Final / BM / Pl. | |
| Team | Event | Opposition Score | Opposition Score | Opposition Score | Rank | Opposition Score | Opposition Score | Opposition Score | Rank |
|---|---|---|---|---|---|---|---|---|---|
| China men's | Men's tournament | Thailand; W 40–7 | Hong Kong; L 17–42 | Pakistan; W 53–0 | 2 Q | Sri Lanka; L 12–17 | Chinese Taipei; W 38–7 | Malaysia; L 7–12 | 6 |
| China women's | Women's tournament | South Korea; W 69–0 | Hong Kong; W 32–7 | Singapore; W 41–0 | 1 Q | Indonesia; W 43–7 | Thailand; W 29–5 | Japan; L 5–7 | 2nd place, silver medalist(s) |

=== Men's tournament ===
Squad

The following is the China squad in the men's rugby sevens tournament of the 2018 Asian Games.

Head coach: Lu Xiaohui

- Chen Yongqiang
- Feng Wenru
- Hu Zhenye
- Jiang Liwei
- Li Haitao
- Liu Junkui
- Liu Luda
- Ma Chong
- Qi Changyuan
- Shan Changshun
- Wang Jianhua
- Zhang Chao

Group A

| Pos | Team | Pld | W | D | L | PF | PA | PD | Pts | Qualification |
|---|---|---|---|---|---|---|---|---|---|---|
| 1 | Hong Kong | 3 | 3 | 0 | 0 | 142 | 29 | +113 | 9 | Quarterfinals |
| 2 | China | 3 | 2 | 0 | 1 | 110 | 49 | +61 | 7 | Quarterfinals |
| 3 | Thailand | 3 | 1 | 0 | 2 | 57 | 76 | −19 | 5 | Quarterfinals |
| 4 | Pakistan | 3 | 0 | 0 | 3 | 5 | 160 | −155 | 3 | Ranking round 9–12 |

Source: Results

30 August
12:28

| China | 40–7 | Thailand |
| Try: Shan (2) 2' c, 9' m Feng (2) 6' c, 7+' c Li 8' c Qi 14+' c Con: Shan (4/5); Qi (1/1) | | Try: Thitisakulvit 4' c Con: Khamkoet (1/1) |

Gelora Bung Karno Rugby Field, Jakarta
Referee: Suguru Kamamuta (Japan)

30 August
16:30

| Hong Kong | 42–17 | China |
| Try: Rimene (2) 1' c, 7+' c Yiu 3' c Nardoni (2) 6' c, 9' c Denmark 11' c Con: Rimene (5/5); Hood (1/1) | | Try: Shan (2) 4' m, 13' m Liu J. 14+' c Con: Ma (0/2); Shan (1/1) |

Gelora Bung Karno Rugby Field, Jakarta
Referee: Suguru Kamamuta (Japan)

31 August
12:50

| China | 53–0 | Pakistan |
| Try: Shan (2) 2' m, 7' m Jiang (2) 4' c, 6' c Hu 8' m Ma 10' m Liu J. (2) 12' c, 14' c Wang 13' m Con: Shan (0/3); Ma (2/3); Feng (2/2); Wang (0/1) |

Gelora Bung Karno Rugby Field, Jakarta
Referee: Patrick Kwok (Hong Kong)

Quarterfinal

31 August
17:36

| Sri Lanka | 17–12 | China |
| Try: Sooriyarachchi 5' c Sooriyabandara 6' m Raffaideen 7+' m Con: Sooriyarachchi (1/1); Sooriyabandara (0/2) | | Try: Zhang 2' m Shan 10' c Con: Shan (1/2) |

Gelora Bung Karno Rugby Field, Jakarta
Referee: Noriaki Hashimoto (Japan)

Classification semifinal (5–8)

1 September
16:12

| Chinese Taipei | 7–38 | China |
| Try: Huang T. 6' c Con: Huang P. (1/1) | | Try: Qi (2) 3' c, 7+' m Zhang 5' m Feng 10' c Ma 12' c Con: Ma (1/3); Feng (2/2) |

Gelora Bung Karno Rugby Field, Jakarta
Referee: Patrick Kwok (Hong Kong)

Fifth place game

1 September
19:30

| China | 7–12 | Malaysia |
| Try: Ma 10' c Con: Ma (1/1) | | Try: Nasarrudin 3' m Ismail 5' c Con: Mat Zizi (1/2) |

Gelora Bung Karno Rugby Field, Jakarta
Referee: Suguru Kamamuta (Japan)

=== Women's tournament ===
Squad

The following is the China squad in the women's rugby sevens tournament of the 2018 Asian Games.

Head coach: (New Zealand) Chad Brenan Shepherd

- Chen Keyi
- Chen Ming
- Gao Yueying
- Hu Yu
- Liu Xiaoqian
- Lu Yuanyuan
- Sun Caihong
- Wang Wanyu
- Yan Meiling
- Yang Min
- Yu Liping
- Yu Xiaoming

Group A

| Pos | Team | Pld | W | D | L | PF | PA | PD | Pts | Qualification |
|---|---|---|---|---|---|---|---|---|---|---|
| 1 | China | 3 | 3 | 0 | 0 | 142 | 7 | +135 | 9 | Quarterfinals |
| 2 | Hong Kong | 3 | 2 | 0 | 1 | 71 | 39 | +32 | 7 | Quarterfinals |
| 3 | Singapore | 3 | 1 | 0 | 2 | 29 | 84 | −55 | 5 | Quarterfinals |
| 4 | South Korea | 3 | 0 | 0 | 3 | 17 | 129 | −112 | 3 | Quarterfinals |

Source: Results

30 August
11:00

| China | 69–0 | South Korea |
| Try: Yu X. 2' m Chen K. (3) 3' c, 13' c, 14' m Yang (2) 6' c, 14+' c Wang (2) 7+' c, 8' m Liu (2) 10' m, 10' c Chen M. 13' c Con: Yu X. (2/3); Chen K. (1/2); Chen M. (4/5) |

Gelora Bung Karno Rugby Field, Jakarta
Referee: Patrick Kwok (Hong Kong)

30 August
15:02

| China | 32–7 | Hong Kong |
| Try: Chen K. (2) 1' m, 9' m Yu X. 4' m Yan 7+' m Liu 12' c Yu L. 13' m Con: Yu X. (1/4); Chen K. (0/1); Chen M. (0/1) | | Try: A. Poon 14' c Con: A. Poon (1/1) |

Gelora Bung Karno Rugby Field, Jakarta
Referee: Sakurako Kawasaki (Japan)

31 August
10:30

| China | 41–0 | Singapore |
| Try: Hu 1' m Liu (2) 7' c, 11' m Chen M. (2) 8' c, 9' m Yan 13' m Lu 14+' c Con: Chen M. (2/5); Yu X. (0/1); Chen K. (1/1) |

Gelora Bung Karno Rugby Field, Jakarta
Referee: Sakurako Kawasaki (Japan)

Quarterfinal

31 August
15:02

| China | 43–7 | Indonesia |
| Try: Chen K. (3) 3' c, 5' m, 7' c Liu 8' m Hu 10' c Lu 12' c Wang 14+' m Con: Chen M. (3/5); Chen K. (1/1); Yu X. (0/1) | | Try: Olua 13' c Con: Olua (1/1) |

Gelora Bung Karno Rugby Field, Jakarta
Referee: Leow Wei Liang (Singapore)

Semifinal

1 September
15:28

| China | 29–5 | Thailand |
| Try: Chen K. (2) 3' c, 11' m Yang 9' m Wang 13' m Hu 14+' c Con: Chen K. (1/2); Yu X. (0/1); Yang (0/1); Chen M. (1/1) | | Try: Wittayaronnayut 7' m Con: Bunrak (0/1) |

Gelora Bung Karno Rugby Field, Jakarta
Referee: Sakurako Kawasaki (Japan)

Gold medal game

1 September
20:40

| China | 5–7 | Japan |
| Try: Chen K. 9' m Con: Chen K. (0/1) | | Try: Hirano 6' c Con: Okuroda (1/1) |

Gelora Bung Karno Rugby Field, Jakarta
Referee: Patrick Kwok (Hong Kong)

== Sailing ==
Men

| Athlete | Event | Race | | | | | | | | | | | | | | | Total | Rank |
| Athlete | Event | 1 | 2 | 3 | 4 | 5 | 6 | 7 | 8 | 9 | 10 | 11 | 12 | 13 | 14 | 15 | Total | Rank |
|---|---|---|---|---|---|---|---|---|---|---|---|---|---|---|---|---|---|---|
| Bi Kun | RS:X | 1 | 1 | ~~(4)~~ | 1 | 2 | 1 | 1 | 1 | 1 | 1 | 1 | 2 | 1 | 4 | 1 | 19 | 1st place, gold medalist(s) |
| Qiu Yulong | Laser | 6 | 6 | 6 | 7 | 6 | ~~(8)~~ | 5 | 2 | 5 | 5 | 5 | 7 | —N/a | | | 60 | 6 |
| Hong Wei; Zhang Tao | 49er | 7 | 6 | ~~(10)~~; DSQ | 8 | 6 | 8 | 7 | 7 | 5 | 9 | 10; RET | 8 | 7 | 6 | 5 | 99 | 8 |
| Wang Chao; Xu Zangjun | 470 | 2 | 1 | 2 | 2 | 2 | 3 | 3 | 2 | 2 | 2 | ~~(4)~~ | 1 | —N/a | | | 22 | 2nd place, silver medalist(s) |

Women

| Athlete | Event | Race | | | | | | | | | | | | | | | Total | Rank |
| Athlete | Event | 1 | 2 | 3 | 4 | 5 | 6 | 7 | 8 | 9 | 10 | 11 | 12 | 13 | 14 | 15 | Total | Rank |
|---|---|---|---|---|---|---|---|---|---|---|---|---|---|---|---|---|---|---|
| Chen Peina | RS:X | ~~(2)~~ | 1 | 2 | 1 | 1 | 2 | 1 | 2 | 1 | 2 | 1 | 1 | 1 | 1 | 2 | 19 | 1st place, gold medalist(s) |
| Zhang Dongshuang | Laser Radial | ~~(11)~~; DSQ | 1 | 3 | 2 | 3 | 1 | 4 | 2 | 2 | 2 | 4 | 1 | —N/a | | | 25 | 2nd place, silver medalist(s) |
| He Xian; Yu Xuebin | 49er FX | 2 | 3 | 2 | 2 | 4 | 4 | ~~(6)~~; DSQ | 4 | 4 | 2 | 2 | 2 | 4 | 6 DSQ | 2 | 43 | 4 |
| Wei Menxi; Gao Haiyan | 470 | 2 | 2 | 2 | 2 | 2 | ~~(8)~~; DSQ | 2 | 2 | 2 | 1 | 1 | 3 | —N/a | | | 21 | 2nd place, silver medalist(s) |

Mixed

| Athlete | Event | Race | | | | | | | | | | | | | | | Total | Rank |
| Athlete | Event | 1 | 2 | 3 | 4 | 5 | 6 | 7 | 8 | 9 | 10 | 11 | 12 | 13 | 14 | 15 | Total | Rank |
|---|---|---|---|---|---|---|---|---|---|---|---|---|---|---|---|---|---|---|
| Chen Jiaming | Laser 4.7 | 8 | 10 | 2 | 9 | 7 | ~~(11)~~ | 11 | 5 | 7 | 7 | 8 | 5 | —N/a | | | 79 | 6 |
| Wang Jianxiong | Laser 4.7 | 3 | 1 | 1 | 6 | 2 | ~~(24)~~; UFD | 1 | 8 | 5 | 5 | 7 | 3 | —N/a | | | 42 | 2nd place, silver medalist(s) |
| Chen Hao; Tan Yue | RS:One | 2 | 3 | ~~(6)~~ | 3 | 3 | 3 | 2 | 4 | 2 | 2 | 2 | 3 | 3 | 2 | 2 | 36 | 1st place, gold medalist(s) |

== Sepak takraw ==
Men

| Athlete | Event | Group Stage | | | | | Semifinal | Final | |
| Athlete | Event | Opposition Score | Opposition Score | Opposition Score | Opposition Score | Rank | Opposition Score | Opposition Score | Rank |
|---|---|---|---|---|---|---|---|---|---|
| Fan Xu; Zhang Ruhao; Wang Wei; Kang Xinyu; Yang Jiapeng | Regu | South Korea (KOR); L 0–2 | Nepal (NEP); W 2–0 | India (IND); L 1–2 | Malaysia (MAS); L 0–2 | 4 | Did not advance | | |
| Fan Xu; Bai Yinpeng; Zhang Ruhao; Wang Wei; Kang Xinyu; Yang Jiapeng | Quadrant | Indonesia (INA); L 0–2 | Laos (LAO); L 0–2 | Myanmar (MYA); L 0–2 | Japan (JPN); L 0–2 | 5 | Did not advance | | |

== Shooting ==
Men

| Athlete | Event | Qualification | | Final | |
| Athlete | Event | Points | Rank | Points | Rank |
|---|---|---|---|---|---|
| Wang Mengyi | 10 m air pistol | 581 | 5 Q | 114.6 | 8 |
| Wu Jiayu | 10 m air pistol | 582 | 3 Q | 197.6 | 4 |
| Lin Junmin | 25 m rapid fire pistol | 588 | 2 Q | 33 | 2nd place, silver medalist(s) |
| Yao Zhaonan | 25 m rapid fire pistol | 585 | 3 Q | 34 GR | 1st place, gold medalist(s) |
| Hui Zicheng | 10 m air rifle | 627.2 | 3 Q | 163.0 | 6 |
| Yang Haoran | 10 m air rifle | 632.9 EQAsR | 1 Q | 249.1 GR | 1st place, gold medalist(s) |
| Hui Zicheng | 50 m rifle three positions | 1172 | 2 Q | 453.3 | 1st place, gold medalist(s) |
| Yang Haoran | 50 m rifle three positions | 1174 QGR | 1 Q | 431.1 | 4 |
| Cao Bo | 300 m standard rifle | —N/a | | 559 | 6 |
| Sun Jian | 300 m standard rifle | —N/a | | 557 | 8 |
| Gan Yu | 10 m running target | 562 | 10 | Did not advance | |
| Xie Durun | 10 m running target | 567 | 6 | Did not advance | |
| Gan Yu | 10 m running target mixed | —N/a | | 379 | 3rd place, bronze medalist(s) |
| Xie Durun | 10 m running target mixed | —N/a | | 368 | 10 |
| Du Yu | Trap | 117 | 10 | Did not advance | |
| Han Fei | Trap | 116 | 16 | Did not advance | |
| Liu Anlong | Double trap | 138 | 4 Q | 43 | 4 |
| Qi Ying | Double trap | 135 | 7 | Did not advance | |
| Jin Di | Skeet | 121 | 5 Q | 52 GR | 2nd place, silver medalist(s) |
| Yang Jiang | Skeet | 117 | 20 | Did not advance | |

Women

| Athlete | Event | Qualification | | Final | |
| Athlete | Event | Points | Rank | Points | Rank |
|---|---|---|---|---|---|
| Ji Xiaojing | 10 m air pistol | 568 | 13 | Did not advance | |
| Wang Qian | 10 m air pistol | 580 AR | 1 Q | 240.3 GR | 1st place, gold medalist(s) |
| Lin Yuemei | 25 m pistol | 583 | 5 Q | 26 | 4 |
| Yao Yushi | 25 m pistol | 578 | 12 | Did not advance | |
| Wu Mingyang | 10 m air rifle | 621.4 | 11 | Did not advance | |
| Zhao Ruozhu | 10 m air rifle | 631.9 QGR | 1 Q | 250.9 GR | 1st place, gold medalist(s) |
| Wang Zeru | 50 m rifle three positions | 1145 | 18 | Did not advance | |
| Zhang Binbin | 50 m rifle three positions | 1153 | 13 | Did not advance | |
| Wang Xiaojing | Trap | 116 | 8 | Did not advance | |
| Zhang Xinqiu | Trap | 117 | 4 Q | 45 EAsR, GR | 1st place, gold medalist(s) |
| Bai Yiting | Double trap | —N/a | | 134 | 2nd place, silver medalist(s) |
| Li Qingnian | Double trap | —N/a | | 136 WR, AsR, GR | 1st place, gold medalist(s) |
| Wei Meng | Skeet | 120 | 2 Q | 54 | 2nd place, silver medalist(s) |
| Zhang Donglian | Skeet | 121 QAsR, QGR | 1 Q | 22 | 5 |

Mixed team

| Athlete | Event | Qualification | | Final | |
| Athlete | Event | Points | Rank | Points | Rank |
|---|---|---|---|---|---|
| Wu Jiayu; Ji Xiaojing | 10 m air pistol | 769 QGR | 1 Q | 473.2 GR | 1st place, gold medalist(s) |
| Yang Haoran; Zhao Ruozhu | 10 m air rifle | 831.1 | 4 Q | 492.5 | 2nd place, silver medalist(s) |
| Du Yu; Wang Xiaojing | Trap | 146 QWR, QAsR, QGR | 1 Q | 31 | 3rd place, bronze medalist(s) |

== Soft tennis ==
| Athlete | Event | Group Stage | | | | Quarterfinals | Semifinals | Final | |
| Athlete | Event | Opposition Score | Opposition Score | Opposition Score | Rank | Opposition Score | Opposition Score | Opposition Score | Rank |
|---|---|---|---|---|---|---|---|---|---|
| Wang Yufei | Women's singles | Trần THN (VIE); W 4–0 | Hong J-s (PRK); L 0–4 | Cheng C-l (TPE); L 0–4 | 3 | Did not advance | | | |
| Yu Yuanyi | Women's singles | N Bulgan (MGL); W 4–0 | M Aliya (LAO); W 4–0 | A Mehra (IND); W 4–2 | 1 Q | Kim M-h (PRK); W 4–3 | N Takahashi (JPN); L 0–4 | Did not advance | 3rd place, bronze medalist(s) |
| Feng Zixuan; Liu Yin; Ma Yue; Wang Yufei; Yu Yuanyi | Women's team | Chinese Taipei (TPE); L 1–2 | Philippines (PHI); W 3–0 | —N/a | 2 Q | Indonesia (INA); W 2–0 | South Korea (KOR); L 0–2 | Did not advance | 3rd place, bronze medalist(s) |

== Softball ==
China women's national softball team qualified for the Asian Games by finishing fourth in the 2017 Asian Women's Softball Championship.

Summary

| Team | Event | Group Stage | | Semifinal | Bronze medal game | Final | |
| Team | Event | Opposition Score | Rank | Opposition Score | Opposition Score | Opposition Score | Rank |
|---|---|---|---|---|---|---|---|
| China women's | Women's tournament | Indonesia: W 12–0; Hong Kong: W 10–0; Philippines: L 0–1; South Korea: W 2–1; Chinese Taipei: W 5–0; Japan: L 1–14 | 2 Q | Japan; L 0–5 | match for final Chinese Taipei; L 4–5 | Did not advance | 3rd place, bronze medalist(s) |

Roster

- Chai Yinan
- Chen Jia
- Li Huan
- Li Qi
- Liu Lili
- Liu Yining
- Lu Ying
- Ren Min
- Wang Bei
- Wang Lan
- Wang Mengyan
- Wang Xiaoqing
- Xi Kailin
- Xu Jia
- Xu Qianwen
- Zhang Yan
- Zhao Xinxing

Preliminary round

| Final round |
| Eliminated |

The top four teams will advance to the Final round.

| Team | W | L | RS | RA | WIN% | GB | Tiebreaker |
|---|---|---|---|---|---|---|---|
| Japan | 6 | 0 | 59 | 3 | 1.000 | – | |
| China | 4 | 2 | 30 | 16 | 0.667 | 2 | 1–1; RA = 1 |
| Philippines | 4 | 2 | 20 | 17 | 0.667 | 2 | 1–1; RA = 3 |
| Chinese Taipei | 4 | 2 | 27 | 13 | 0.667 | 2 | 1–1; RA = 7 |
| South Korea | 2 | 4 | 15 | 23 | 0.333 | 4 | |
| Indonesia | 1 | 5 | 15 | 41 | 0.167 | 5 | |
| Hong Kong | 0 | 6 | 2 | 55 | 0.000 | 6 | |

| August 19; 12:30 | China | 12–0 | Indonesia | GBK Softball field |
| August 19; 12:30 | | Boxscore | | GBK Softball field |

| August 20; 12:30 | China | 10–0 | Hong Kong | GBK Softball field |
| August 20; 12:30 | | Boxscore | | GBK Softball field |

| August 20; 20:00 | China | 0–1 | Philippines | GBK Softball field |
| August 20; 20:00 | | Boxscore | | GBK Softball field |

| August 21; 10:00 | China | 2–1 | South Korea | GBK Softball field |
| August 21; 10:00 | | Boxscore | | GBK Softball field |

| August 21; 20:00 | China | 5–0 | Chinese Taipei | GBK Softball field |
| August 21; 20:00 | | Boxscore | | GBK Softball field |

| August 22; 17:30 | Japan | 14–1 | China | GBK Softball field |
| August 22; 17:30 | | Boxscore | | GBK Softball field |

Semifinal

August 23 15:00 at GBK Softball field
| Team | 1 | 2 | 3 | 4 | 5 | 6 | 7 | R | H | E |
|---|---|---|---|---|---|---|---|---|---|---|
| China | 0 | 0 | 0 | 0 | 0 | 0 | 0 | 0 | 2 | 1 |
| Japan | 1 | 2 | 2 | 0 | 0 | 0 | X | 5 | 9 | 0 |
WP: Yamato Fujita LP: Zhao Xinxing; Boxscore

Bronze medal match

August 24 10:00 at GBK Softball field
| Team | 1 | 2 | 3 | 4 | 5 | 6 | 7 | 8 | R | H | E |
|---|---|---|---|---|---|---|---|---|---|---|---|
| Chinese Taipei | 1 | 0 | 0 | 0 | 3 | 0 | 0 | 1 | 5 | 10 | 0 |
| China | 1 | 2 | 0 | 0 | 0 | 1 | 0 | 0 | 4 | 9 | 0 |
WP: Chiu An-ju LP: Wang Lan; Boxscore

== Sport climbing ==
Speed

| Athlete | Event | Qualification | | Round of 16 | Quarterfinals | Semifinals | Final / BM | |
| Athlete | Event | Best | Rank | Opposition Time | Opposition Time | Opposition Time | Opposition Time | Rank |
|---|---|---|---|---|---|---|---|---|
| Li Jinxin | Men's | 6.744 | 9 Q | Lee Y-s (KOR); L 8.228–6.629 | Did not advance | | | 13 |
| Zhong Qixin | Men's | 5.822 | 1 Q | C Maibam (IND); W 6.484–7.199 | Lee Y-s (KOR); W 5.975–6.246 | A Jaelolo (INA); W 5.641–5.651 | R Alipour (IRI); L FS–6.390 | 2nd place, silver medalist(s) |
| He Cuilian | Women's | 8.314 | 3 Q | N Yusri (SGP); W 8.828–11.184 | K Lakzaeifar (IRI); W 8.380–11.604 | P Lestari (INA); L 7.942–7.844 | Song YL (CHN); W 7.971–8.200 | 3rd place, bronze medalist(s) |
| Song Yiling | Women's | 8.528 | 4 Q | P Raksachat (THA); W 10.889–11.702 | A Marlenova (KAZ); W 8.591–8.910 | A S Rahayu (INA); L 7.809–7.682 | He CL (CHN); L 8.200–7.971 | 4 |

Speed relay

| Athlete | Event | Qualification | | Quarterfinals | Semifinals | Final / BM | |
| Athlete | Event | Time | Rank | Opposition Time | Opposition Time | Opposition Time | Rank |
|---|---|---|---|---|---|---|---|
| China 1 Duan Yurong; Li Guangfeng; Lin Penghui; Zhong Qixin | Men's | 21.227 | 5 Q | Iran 1 (IRI); W 20.754–24.251 | Indonesia 1 (INA); L 19.874–19.205 | China 2 (CHN); L FS–21.646 | 4 |
| China 2 Li Jinxin; Liang Rongqi; Ou Zhiyong | Men's | 19.868 | 2 Q | Kazakhstan 2 (KAZ); W 20.792–25.645 | Indonesia 2 (INA); L F–18.998 | China 1 (CHN); W 21.646–FS | 3rd place, bronze medalist(s) |
| China 1 He Cuilian; Ni Mingwei; Qiu Haimei; Song Yiling | Women's | 26.234 | 2 Q | Thailand 1 (THA); W 29.652–F | China 2 (CHN); L F–32.245 | Iran 1 (IRI); W 27.860–31.259 | 3rd place, bronze medalist(s) |
| China 2 Deng Lijuan; Niu Di; Pan Xuhua | Women's | 28.004 | 3 Q | South Korea 2 (KOR); W 29.281–33.605 | China 1 (CHN); W 32.245–F | Indonesia 1 (INA); L FS–25.452 | 2nd place, silver medalist(s) |

Combined

| Athlete | Event | Qualification | | | | | Final | | | | |
| Athlete | Event | Speed Point | Boulder Point | Lead Point | Total | Rank | Speed Point | Boulder Point | Lead Point | Total | Rank |
|---|---|---|---|---|---|---|---|---|---|---|---|
| Ma Zida | Men's | 8 | 4 | 13 | 416 | 9 | Did not advance | | | | |
| Pan Yufei | Men's | 15 | 5 | 11 | 825 | 13 | Did not advance | | | | |
| Jiang Rong | Women's | 3 | 9 | 11 | 297 | 8 | Did not advance | | | | |
| Renqing Lamu | Women's | 10 | 10 | 5 | 500 | 11 | Did not advance | | | | |

== Squash ==
Singles

| Athlete | Event | Round of 32 | Round of 16 | Quarterfinals | Semifinals | Final | |
| Athlete | Event | Opposition Score | Opposition Score | Opposition Score | Opposition Score | Opposition Score | Rank |
|---|---|---|---|---|---|---|---|
| Gu Jinyue | Women's | M Kobayashi (JPN); L 0–3 | Did not advance | | | | |
| Li Dongjin | Women's | K Enkhbayar (MGL); W 3–0 | N David (MAS); L 0–3 | Did not advance | | | |

Team

| Athlete | Event | Group Stage | | | | | | Semifinal | Final | |
| Athlete | Event | Opposition Score | Opposition Score | Opposition Score | Opposition Score | Opposition Score | Rank | Opposition Score | Opposition Score | Rank |
|---|---|---|---|---|---|---|---|---|---|---|
| Li Dongjin; Gu Jinyue; Duan Siyu; He Xinru | Women's | Thailand (THA); W 3–0 | Indonesia (INA); L 1–2 | Hong Kong (HKG); L 0–3 | India (IND); L 0–3 | Iran (IRI); W 2–1 | 4 | Did not advance | | |

== Swimming ==
=== Men ===
| Event | Athlete | Heats | | Final | |
| Event | Athlete | Time | Rank | Time | Rank |
|---|---|---|---|---|---|
| 50 m freestyle | Yu Hexin | 22.21 | 1Q | 22.11 | 1st place, gold medalist(s) |
| 50 m freestyle | Zhao Xianjian | 22.86 | 11 | Did not advance | |
| 100 m freestyle | Hou Yujie | 49.52 | 6Q | 48.95 | 4 |
| 100 m freestyle | Yu Hexin | 49.30 | 1Q | 48.88 | 3rd place, bronze medalist(s) |
| 200 m freestyle | Sun Yang | 1:47.58 | 1Q | 1:45.43 | 1st place, gold medalist(s) |
| 200 m freestyle | Ji Xinjie | 1:48.85 | 7Q | 1:46.68 | 3rd place, bronze medalist(s) |
| 400 m freestyle | Sun Yang | 3:49.13 | 1Q | 3:42.92 | 1st place, gold medalist(s) |
| 400 m freestyle | Ji Xinjie | 3:53.11 | 4Q | 3:50.06 | 5 |
| 800 m freestyle | Sun Yang | —N/a | | 7:48.36 GR | 1st place, gold medalist(s) |
| 800 m freestyle | Ji Xinjie | —N/a | | 7:59.99 | 5 |
| 1500 m freestyle | Sun Yang | —N/a | | 14:58.53 | 1st place, gold medalist(s) |
| 1500 m freestyle | Ji Xinjie | —N/a | | 15:06.18 | 3rd place, bronze medalist(s) |
| 50 m backstroke | Xu Jiayu | 25.12 | 2Q | 24.75 | 1st place, gold medalist(s) |
| 50 m backstroke | Wang Peng | 25.33 | 5Q | 25.28 | 4 |
| 100 m backstroke | Xu Jiayu | 53.60 | 1Q | 52.34 | 1st place, gold medalist(s) |
| 100 m backstroke | Li Guangyuan | 54.34 | 3Q | 55.01 | 5 |
| 200 m backstroke | Xu Jiayu | 2:00.53 | 2Q | 1:53.99 | 1st place, gold medalist(s) |
| 200 m backstroke | Li Guangyuan | 1:59.87 | 1Q | 1:57.13 | 4 |
| 50 m breaststroke | Yan Zibei | 27.06 | 1Q | 27.25 | 2nd place, silver medalist(s) |
| 50 m breaststroke | Sun Jiajun | 27.48 | 4Q | 27.65 | 4 |
| 100 m breaststroke | Yan Zibei | 59.91 | 1Q | 59.31 | 2nd place, silver medalist(s) |
| 100 m breaststroke | Qin Haiyang | 1:00.78 | 3Q | 1:00.24 | 5 |
| 200 m breaststroke | Yan Zibei | 2:12.45 | 2Q | 2:11.07 | 4 |
| 200 m breaststroke | Qin Haiyang | 2:13.51 | 5Q | 2:08.07 | 3rd place, bronze medalist(s) |
| 50 m butterfly | Li Zhuhao | 24.13 | 6Q | 23.89 | 5 |
| 50 m butterfly | Wang Peng | 23.89 | 2Q | 23.65 | 2nd place, silver medalist(s) |
| 100 m butterfly | Li Zhuhao | 52.50 | 3Q | 51.46 | 2nd place, silver medalist(s) |
| 100 m butterfly | Zheng Xiaojing | 53.53 | 9 | Did not advance | |
| 200 m butterfly | Li Zhuhao | 1:58.21 | 4Q | 1:55.76 | 3rd place, bronze medalist(s) |
| 200 m butterfly | Wang Zhou | 1:58.71 | 5Q | 1:56.75 | 4 |
| 200 m individual medley | Wang Shun | 2:01.34 | 3Q | 1:56.52 | 1st place, gold medalist(s) |
| 200 m individual medley | Qin Haeyang | 2:00.40 | 2Q | 1:57.09 | 3rd place, bronze medalist(s) |
| 400 m individual medley | Wang Shun | 4:18.67 | 3Q | 4:12.31 | 3rd place, bronze medalist(s) |
| 400 m individual medley | Wang Yizhe | 4:21.55 | 4Q | 4:19.61 | 4 |
| 4 × 100 m freestyle relay | Yang Jintong; Cao Jiwen; Sun Yang; Yu Hexin; Hou Yujie^{[a]} Qian Zhiyong^{[a]} Ma Tianchi^{[a]} Ji Xinjie^{[a]} | 3:17.30 | 1Q | 3:13.29 | 2nd place, silver medalist(s) |
| 4 × 200 m freestyle relay | Ji Xinjie; Shang Keyuan; Wang Shun; Sun Yang; Qiu Ziao^{[a]} Hong Jinlong^{[a]} Hou Yujie^{[a]} Qian Zhiyong^{[a]} | 7:20.80 | 1Q | 7:05.45 | 2nd place, silver medalist(s) |
| 4 × 100 m medley relay | Xu Jiayu; Yan Zibei; Li Zhuhao; Yu Hexin; Li Guangyuan^{[a]} Qin Haiyang^{[a]} Zheng Xiaojing^{[a]} He Junyi^{[a]} | 3:38.14 | 2Q | 3:29.99; AS, GR | 1st place, gold medalist(s) |

^{a} Swimmers who participated in the heats only and received medals.

=== Women ===
| Event | Athlete | Heats | | Final | |
| Event | Athlete | Time | Rank | Time | Rank |
|---|---|---|---|---|---|
| 50 m freestyle | Liu Xiang | 25.14 | 2Q | 24.60 | 2nd place, silver medalist(s) |
| 50 m freestyle | Wu Qingfeng | 25.47 | 3Q | 24.87 | 3rd place, bronze medalist(s) |
| 100 m freestyle | Yang Junxuan | 55.78 | 4Q | 54.17 | 3rd place, bronze medalist(s) |
| 100 m freestyle | Zhu Menghui | 54.67 | 2Q | 53.56 | 2nd place, silver medalist(s) |
| 200 m freestyle | Yang Junxuan | 2:01.30 | 2Q | 1:57.48 | 2nd place, silver medalist(s) |
| 200 m freestyle | Li Bingjie | 2:01.43 | 3Q | 1:56.74 | 1st place, gold medalist(s) |
| 400 m freestyle | Li Bingjie | 4:20.53 | 7Q | 4:06.46 | 2nd place, silver medalist(s) |
| 400 m freestyle | Wang Jianjiahe | 4:19.02 | 2Q | 4:03.18 GR | 1st place, gold medalist(s) |
| 800 m freestyle | Li Bingjie | —N/a | | 8:28.14 | 2nd place, silver medalist(s) |
| 800 m freestyle | Wang Jianjiahe | —N/a | | 8:18.55 GR | 1st place, gold medalist(s) |
| 1500 m freestyle | Li Bingjie | —N/a | | 15:53.80 | 2nd place, silver medalist(s) |
| 1500 m freestyle | Wang Jianjiahe | —N/a | | 15:53.68 GR | 1st place, gold medalist(s) |
| 50 m backstroke | Fu Yuanhui | 28.12 | 2Q | 27.68 | 2nd place, silver medalist(s) |
| 50 m backstroke | Liu Xiang | 27.83 | 1Q | 26.98; WR, AS, GR | 1st place, gold medalist(s) |
| 100 m backstroke | Chen Jie | 1:00.84 | 3Q | 1:00.28 | 3rd place, bronze medalist(s) |
| 100 m backstroke | Fu Yuanhui | 1:02.41 | 6Q | 1:00.35 | 4 |
| 200 m backstroke | Peng Xuwei | 2:11.39 | 2Q | 2:09.14 | 3rd place, bronze medalist(s) |
| 200 m backstroke | Liu Yaxin | 2:09.52 | 1Q | 2:07.65 | 1st place, gold medalist(s) |
| 50 m breaststroke | Feng Junyang | 31.16 | 2Q | 31.24 | 3rd place, bronze medalist(s) |
| 50 m breaststroke | Suo Ran | 31.38 | 4Q | 31.42 | 4 |
| 100 m breaststroke | Yu Jingyao | 1:08.52 | 5Q | 1:07.44 | 4 |
| 100 m breaststroke | Shi Jinglin | 1:07.68 | 3Q | 1:07.36 | 3rd place, bronze medalist(s) |
| 200 m breaststroke | Yu Jingyao | 2:29.76 | 4Q | 2:23.31 | 2nd place, silver medalist(s) |
| 200 m breaststroke | Zhang Xinyu | 2:28.48 | 2Q | 2:26.24 | 4 |
| 50 m butterfly | Wang Yichun | 26.68 | 3Q | 26.03 | 2nd place, silver medalist(s) |
| 50 m butterfly | Lin Xintong | 26.56 | 2Q | 26.39 | 3rd place, bronze medalist(s) |
| 100 m butterfly | Zhang Yufei | 57.68 | 1Q | 57.40 | 2nd place, silver medalist(s) |
| 100 m butterfly | Lin Xintong | 59.94 | 6Q | 58.82 | 5 |
| 200 m butterfly | Yu Liyan | 2:14.56 | 8Q | 2:12.61 | 6 |
| 200 m butterfly | Zhang Yufei | 2:10.83 | 2Q | 2:14.56 | 2nd place, silver medalist(s) |
| 200 m individual medley | Zhou Min | 2:13.82 | 2Q | 2:11.42 | 4 |
| 200 m individual medley | Yang Chang | 2:16.45 | 4Q | 2:13.68 | 5 |
| 400 m individual medley | Zhou Min | 4:42.83 | 2Q | 4:42.75 | 4 |
| 400 m individual medley | Yang Chang | 4:53.56 | 6Q | 4:47.24 | 6 |
| 4 × 100 m freestyle relay | Zhu Menghui; Wu Yue; Wu Qingfeng; Yang Junxuan; Wang Jingzhuo^{[b]} Lao Lihui^{[b]} Liu Xiaohan^{[b]} | 3:40.32 | 1Q | 3:36.78 | 2nd place, silver medalist(s) |
| 4 × 200 m freestyle relay | Li Bingjie; Wang Jianjiahe; Zhang Yuhan; Yang Junxuan; Shen Duo^{[b]} Ai Yanhan^{[b]} Wu Yue^{[b]} | 8:01.41 | 1Q | 7:48.61 GR | 1st place, gold medalist(s) |
| 4 × 100 m medley relay | Chen Jie; Shi Jinglin; Zhang Yufei; Zhu Menghui; Fu Yuanhui^{[c]} Yu Jingyao^{[c]} Lin Xintong ^{[c]} Yang Junxuan^{[c]} | 4:02.67 | 2Q | DSQ | |

^{b} Swimmers who participated in the heats only and received medals.
^{c} Swimmers who participated in the heats.

=== Mixed ===
| Event | Athlete | Heats | | Final | |
| Event | Athlete | Time | Rank | Time | Rank |
|---|---|---|---|---|---|
| 4 × 100 m medley relay | Xu Jiayu; Yan Zibei; Zhang Yufei; Zhu Menghui; Li Guangyuan^{[d]} Shi Jinglin^{[d]} Zheng Xiaojing^{[d]} Yang Junxuan^{[d]} | 3:53.29 | 2Q | 3:40.45; AS, GR | 1st place, gold medalist(s) |

^{[d]} Swimmers who participated in the heats only and received medals.

== Table tennis ==
Individual

| Athlete | Event | Round 1 | Round 2 | Round of 16 | Quarterfinals | Semifinals | Final | |
| Athlete | Event | Opposition Score | Opposition Score | Opposition Score | Opposition Score | Opposition Score | Opposition Score | Rank |
|---|---|---|---|---|---|---|---|---|
| Fan Zhendong | Men's singles | Bye | Xiao ZK (MAC); W 4–0 | Ho KK (HKG); W 4–1 | J Ueda (JPN); W 4–0 | Lee S-s (KOR); W 4–1 | Lin GY (CHN); W 4–2 | 1st place, gold medalist(s) |
| Lin Gaoyuan | Men's singles | Bye | Leong CF (MAS); W 4–0 | Gao N (SGP); W 4–1 | K Matsudaira (JPN); W 4–2 | N Alamian (IRI); W 4–0 | Fan ZD (CHN); L 2–4 | 2nd place, silver medalist(s) |
| Chen Meng | Women's singles | Bye | Nguyễn KDK (VIE); W 4–0 | Chen S-y (TPE); W 4–0 | Lee HC (HKG); W 4–0 | Jeon J-h (KOR); W 4–0 | Wang MY (CHN); L 3–4 | 2nd place, silver medalist(s) |
| Wang Manyu | Women's singles | Bye | I Madurangi (SRI); W 4–0 | M Batra (IND); W 4–1 | Seo H-w (KOR); W 4–0 | Yu MY (SGP); W 4–1 | Chen M (CHN); W 4–3 | 1st place, gold medalist(s) |
| Lin Gaoyuan; Wang Manyu | Mixed doubles | Bye | S Shrestha / N Shrestha (PAK); W 3–1 | Park S-h / Kim N-h (PRK); W 3–0 | Lim J-h / Yang H-e (KOR); W 3–0 | Ho KK / Lee HC (HKG); W 4–0 | Wang CQ / Sun YS (CHN); L 2–4 | 2nd place, silver medalist(s) |
| Wang Chuqin; Sun Yingsha | Mixed doubles | Bye | S Wisutmaythangkoon / P Orawan (THA); W 3–0 | J Ueda / M Maeda (JPN); W 3–0 | Gao N / Yu MY (SGP); W 3–0 | S Kamal / M Batra (IND); W 4–1 | Lin GY / Wang MY (CHN); W 4–2 | 1st place, gold medalist(s) |

Team

| Athlete | Event | Group Stage | | | | | Quarterfinal | Semifinal | Final | |
| Athlete | Event | Opposition Score | Opposition Score | Opposition Score | Opposition Score | Rank | Opposition Score | Opposition Score | Opposition Score | Rank |
|---|---|---|---|---|---|---|---|---|---|---|
| Liang Jingkun; Wang Chuqin; Fan Zhendong; Lin Gaoyuan; Xue Fei | Men's | Nepal (NEP); W 3–0 | Malaysia (MAS); W 3–0 | North Korea (PRK); W 3–0 | Laos (LAO); W 3–0 | 1 Q | Hong Kong (HKG); W 3–0 | Chinese Taipei (TPE); W 3–1 | South Korea (KOR); W 3–0 | 1st place, gold medalist(s) |
| Sun Yingsha; Chen Xingtong; Chen Meng; Wang Manyu; Zhu Yuling | Women's | Iran (IRI); W 3–0 | India (IND); W 3–0 | Qatar (QAT); W 3–0 | —N/a | 1 Q | Japan (JPN); W 3–0 | South Korea (KOR); W 3–0 | North Korea (PRK); W 3–0 | 1st place, gold medalist(s) |

== Taekwondo ==
Poomsae

| Athlete | Event | Round of 16 | Quarterfinal | Semifinal | Final | |
| Athlete | Event | Opposition Score | Opposition Score | Opposition Score | Opposition Score | Rank |
|---|---|---|---|---|---|---|
| Hu Mingda | Men's individual | W Moghis (NEP); W 8.34–7.86 | Chen C (TPE); L 8.15–8.31 | Did not advance | | |
| Zhu Yuxiang; Hu Mingda; Deng Tingfeng | Men's team | Bye | Thailand; W 8.48–8.36 | Philippines; W 8.18–7.83 | South Korea; L 8.02–8.48 | 2nd place, silver medalist(s) |
| Ji Yuhan | Women's individual | P Phaisankiattikun (THA); W 7.99–7.95 | Yap K W (MAS); L 8.18–8.20 | Did not advance | | |
| Ji Yuhan; Wei Mengyue; Liu Yuqing | Women's team | Vietnam; L 7.92–7.99 | Did not advance | | | |

Kyorugi

| Athlete | Event | Round of 32 | Round of 16 | Quarterfinal | Semifinal | Final | |
| Athlete | Event | Opposition Score | Opposition Score | Opposition Score | Opposition Score | Opposition Score | Rank |
|---|---|---|---|---|---|---|---|
| Chen Xiaoyi | Men's −58 kg | J Torillos (PHI); W 27–26 | Kim T-h (KOR); L 2–40 | Did not advance | | | |
| Zhao Shuai | Men's −63 kg | Bye | K Mehtarshoev (TJK); W 24–4 | M Tümenbayar (MGL); W 25–5 | Ho C-h (TPE); W 8–7 | M Hosseini (IRI); L 11–17 | 2nd place, silver medalist(s) |
| Song Guodong | Men's −68 kg | N Klompon (THA); L 18–20 | Did not advance | | | | |
| Chen Linglong | Men's −80 kg | Bye | N Mssn (IND); W 20–6 | S El-Sharabaty (JOR); L 8–13 | Did not advance | | |
| Sun Hongyi | Men's +80 kg | —N/a | K Uy (PHI); W 9–7 | S Rajabi (IRI); L 4–5 | Did not advance | | |
| Wenren Yuntao | Women's −49 kg | Bye | A El-Haddad (LBN); L 7–8 | Did not advance | | | |
| Liu Kaiqi | Women's −53 kg | Bye | Hồ T K N (VIE); W 19–5 | Ha M-a (KOR); L 4–10 | Did not advance | | |
| Luo Zongshi | Women's −57 kg | Bye | M Tulepbergenova (KAZ); W 14–11 | P C Nadya (INA); W 28–2 | P Lopez (PHI); W 11–4 | Lee A-r (KOR); W 6–5 | 1st place, gold medalist(s) |
| Zhang Mengyu | Women's −67 kg | —N/a | Chen Y-y (TPE); W 10–8 | S Yangtsho (BHU); W 35–0 | J Al-Sadeq (JOR); L 5–14 | Did not advance | 3rd place, bronze medalist(s) |
| Gao Pan | Women's +67 kg | —N/a | N Rawal (NEP); W 22–6 | Ma T-h (TPE); W 3–0 | Lee D-b (KOR); L 8–25 | Did not advance | 3rd place, bronze medalist(s) |

== Tennis ==
Men

| Athlete | Event | Round of 64 | Round of 32 | Round of 16 | Quarterfinals | Semifinals | Final | |
| Athlete | Event | Opposition Score | Opposition Score | Opposition Score | Opposition Score | Opposition Score | Opposition Score | Rank |
|---|---|---|---|---|---|---|---|---|
| Wu Yibing | Singles | Bye | J Patrombon (PHI); W 6–2, 6–1 | Y Uchiyama (JPN); W 6–3, 7–6^{8–6} | J Karimov (UZB); W 6–2, 6–4 | Lee D-h (KOR); W 6–3, 3–6, 7–5 | D Istomin (UZB); L 6–2, 2–6, 6–7^{2–7} | 2nd place, silver medalist(s) |
| Zhang Zhizhen | Singles | Bye | A Lim (PHI); W 6–4, 6–2 | D Istomin (UZB); L 4–6, 3–6 | Did not advance | | | |
| Gong Maoxin; Zhang Ze | Doubles | Bye | D Erdenebayar / M Badrakh (MGL); W 6–0, 6–1 | Kwon S-w / Lim Y-k (KOR); W 7–5, 7–5 | S Shimabukuro / K Uesugi (JPN); L 6–4, 2–6, [2–10] | Did not advance | | |
| Li Zhe; Wu Di | Doubles | Bye | A Akram / AF Mohammed (MDV); W 6–0, 6–1 | A Bublik / D Yevseyev (KAZ); L 4–6, 6–7^{6–8} | Did not advance | | | |

Women

| Athlete | Event | Round of 64 | Round of 32 | Round of 16 | Quarterfinals | Semifinals | Final | |
| Athlete | Event | Opposition Score | Opposition Score | Opposition Score | Opposition Score | Opposition Score | Opposition Score | Rank |
|---|---|---|---|---|---|---|---|---|
| Wang Qiang | Singles | Bye | Jeong S-n (KOR); W 6–4, 6–1 | G Ainitdinova (KAZ); W 6–2, 6–4 | A Sutjiadi (INA); W 6–4, 6–3 | Liang E-s (TPE); W 6–1, 6–3 | Zhang S (CHN); W 6–3, 6–2 | 1st place, gold medalist(s) |
| Zhang Shuai | Singles | Bye | A Seneviratne (SRI); W 6–1, 6–2 | F Al-Nabhani (OMA); W 7–6^{7–5}, 6–1 | Han N-l (KOR); W 6–3, 6–3 | A Raina (IND); W 6–4, 7–6^{8–6} | Wang Q (CHN); L 3–6, 2–6 | 2nd place, silver medalist(s) |
| Duan Yingying; Wang Yafan | Doubles | —N/a | Bye | Kang S-k / Lee S-r (KOR); W 6–2, 6–4 | G Ainitdinova / A Danilina (KAZ); L 6–2, 3–6, [5–10] | Did not advance | | |
| Xu Yifan; Yang Zhaoxuan | Doubles | —N/a | Bye | D Detkovskaya / Z Kulambayeva (KAZ); W 6–4, 6–0 | N Lertpitaksinchai / P Plipuech (THA); W 6–3, 1–6, [10–7] | M Kato / M Ninomiya (JPN); W 6–4, 6–2 | Chan H-c / L Chan (TPE); W 6–2, 1–6, [11–9] | 1st place, gold medalist(s) |

Mixed

| Athlete | Event | Round of 64 | Round of 32 | Round of 16 | Quarterfinals | Semifinals | Final | |
| Athlete | Event | Opposition Score | Opposition Score | Opposition Score | Opposition Score | Opposition Score | Opposition Score | Rank |
|---|---|---|---|---|---|---|---|---|
| Xu Yifan; Zhang Ze | Doubles | Bye | F Al-Nabhani / M Al Nabhani (OMA); W 6–2, 6–2 | G Ainitdinova / T Khabibulin (KAZ); W 6–1, 7–5 | E Hayashi / K Uesugi (JPN); L 6–7^{4–7}, 6–0, [8–10] | Did not advance | | |
| Yang Zhaoxuan; Gong Maoxin | Doubles | Bye | S Battör / T Enkhsaikhan (MGL); W 6–0, 6–0 | Zhang L / Yeung P-l (HKG); L 6–4, 4–6, [7–10] | Did not advance | | | |

== Triathlon ==
Individual

| Athlete | Event | Swim (1.5 km) | Trans 1 | Bike (39.6 km) | Trans 2 | Run (10 km) | Total Time | Rank |
|---|---|---|---|---|---|---|---|---|
| Jiang Zhihang | Men's | 18:51 | 0:25 | 56:35 | 0:24 | 34:38 | 1:50:53 | 4 |
| Li Mingxu | Men's | 18:51 | 0:26 | 56:35 | 0:21 | 34:36 | 1:50:49 | 3rd place, bronze medalist(s) |
| Zhang Yi | Women's | 20:20 | 0:28 | 1:02:06 | 0:20 | 39:00 | 2:02:14 | 4 |
| Zhong Mengying | Women's | 19:14 | 0:27 | 1:03:10 | 0:21 | 38:04 | 2:01:15 | 2nd place, silver medalist(s) |

Mixed relay

| Athletes | Event | Total Times per Athlete (Swim 300 m, Bike 6.3 km, Run 2.1 km) | Total Group Time | Rank |
|---|---|---|---|---|
| Li Mingxu; Liu Chen; Zhang Yi; Zhong Mengying | Mixed relay | 22:25; 22:42; 24:35; 23:41 | 1:33:23 | 4 |

== Volleyball ==
=== Beach volleyball ===
| Athlete | Event | Preliminary | | Round of 16 | Quarterfinals | Semifinals | Final / BM | |
| Athlete | Event | Oppositions Scores | Rank | Opposition Score | Opposition Score | Opposition Score | Opposition Score | Rank |
|---|---|---|---|---|---|---|---|---|
| Gao Peng; Li Yang | Men's tournament | Hsu – Wu (TPE): W 2–0; Nordin – Saifuddin (MAS): W 2–0; Kuleshov – Babichev (KAZ): W 2–0 | 1 Q | Al-Housni – Al Shereiqi (OMA); W 2–1 | Mirzaali – Raoufi (IRI); W 2–0 | Janko – Samba (QAT); L 0–2 | Ramadhan – Pribadi (INA); L 1–2 | 4 |
| Wu Jiaxin; Mutailipu Aboduhalikejiang | Men's tournament | Alikhail – Mayar (AFG): W 2–0; Ageba – Shiratori (JPN): W 2–0; Pham – Nguyen (VIE): W 2–0 | 1 Q | Hasegawa – Shimizu (JPN); W 2–1 | Rachmawan – Ashfiya (INA); L 1–2 | Did not advance | | |
| Wang Fan; Xia Xinyi | Women's tournament | Kim H-j – Kim H-n (KOR): W 2–0; Kou – Liu (TPE): W 2–0; Yuen – Au Yeung (HKG): W 2–0 | 1 Q | Bye | Ratnasari – Eka (INA); W 2–0 | Juliana – Utami (INA); W 2–1 | Ishii – Murakami (JPN); W 2–1 | 1st place, gold medalist(s) |
| Wang Xinxin; Zeng Jinjin | Women's tournament | Yu – Pan (TPE): W 2–1; Ishii – Murakami (JPN): L 0–2; Tran – Truong (VIE):W 2–1 | 2 Q | Yuen – Au Yeung (HKG); W 2–0 | Mashkova – Tsimbalova (KAZ); L 1–2 | Did not advance | | |

=== Indoor volleyball ===
| Team | Event | Group Stage | | Playoffs | Quarterfinals / Pl. | Semifinals / Pl. | Final / BM / Pl. | |
| Team | Event | Oppositions Scores | Rank | Opposition Score | Opposition Score | Opposition Score | Opposition Score | Rank |
|---|---|---|---|---|---|---|---|---|
| China men's | Men's tournament | Vietnam: L 2–3; Thailand: W 3–2; Sri Lanka: W 3–1 | 2 Q | Bye | Iran; L 0–3 | 7th–10th place Pakistan; L 2–3 | 9th place Saudi Arabia; W 3–0 | 9 |
| China women's | Women's tournament | Vietnam: W 3–0; Chinese Taipei: W 3–0; South Korea: W 3–0; Kazakhstan: W 3–0; India: W 3–0 | 1 Q | —N/a | Philippines; W 3–0 | Japan; W 3–0 | Thailand; W 3–0 | 1st place, gold medalist(s) |

==== Men's tournament ====
Team roster

The following is the Chinese roster in the men's volleyball tournament of the 2018 Asian Games.

Head coach: Shen Qiong

| No. | Name | Date of birth | Height | Weight | Spike | Block | Club |
|---|---|---|---|---|---|---|---|
| 1 | Li Rui | 15 March 1990 | 2.07 m (6 ft 9 in) | 86 kg (190 lb) | 350 cm (140 in) | 330 cm (130 in) | (China) Henan |
| 3 | Yu Yuantai | 3 December 1997 | 1.83 m (6 ft 0 in) | 77 kg (170 lb) | 320 cm (130 in) | 310 cm (120 in) | (China) Jiangsu |
| 4 | Zhang Chen (c) | 28 June 1985 | 2.00 m (6 ft 7 in) | 85 kg (187 lb) | 355 cm (140 in) | 344 cm (135 in) | (China) Jiangsu |
| 5 | Zhong Weijun | 20 April 1989 | 2.00 m (6 ft 7 in) | 95 kg (209 lb) | 347 cm (137 in) | 335 cm (132 in) | (China) Shanghai |
| 6 | Li Runming | 1 March 1990 | 1.98 m (6 ft 6 in) | 90 kg (200 lb) | 355 cm (140 in) | 345 cm (136 in) | (China) Shandong |
| 7 | Wang Jingyi | 7 February 1998 | 2.02 m (6 ft 8 in) | 87 kg (192 lb) | 360 cm (140 in) | 350 cm (140 in) | (China) Shandong |
| 8 | Yuan Dangyi | 30 November 1996 | 2.00 m (6 ft 7 in) | 91 kg (201 lb) | 355 cm (140 in) | 343 cm (135 in) | (China) Bayi |
| 9 | Zhan Guojun | 16 December 1988 | 1.97 m (6 ft 6 in) | 85 kg (187 lb) | 355 cm (140 in) | 330 cm (130 in) | (China) Shanghai |
| 10 | Li Liye | 27 June 1996 | 1.96 m (6 ft 5 in) | 87 kg (192 lb) | 350 cm (140 in) | 340 cm (130 in) | (China) Bayi |
| 11 | Li Yuanbo | 27 September 1995 | 1.96 m (6 ft 5 in) | 80 kg (180 lb) | 345 cm (136 in) | 335 cm (132 in) | (China) Bayi |
| 12 | Zhang Zhejia | 31 August 1995 | 2.10 m (6 ft 11 in) | 90 kg (200 lb) | 357 cm (141 in) | 345 cm (136 in) | (China) Shanghai |
| 13 | Peng Shikun | 26 August 2000 | 2.08 m (6 ft 10 in) | 90 kg (200 lb) | 340 cm (130 in) | 330 cm (130 in) | (China) Sichuan |
| 16 | Ren Qi | 24 February 1984 | 1.74 m (5 ft 9 in) | 70 kg (150 lb) | 322 cm (127 in) | 312 cm (123 in) | (China) Shanghai |
| 18 | Chen Jiajie | 17 September 1995 | 1.70 m (5 ft 7 in) | 72 kg (159 lb) | 325 cm (128 in) | 310 cm (120 in) | (China) Guangdong |

Pool E

| Pos | Team | Pld | W | L | Pts | SW | SL | SR | SPW | SPL | SPR | Qualification |
|---|---|---|---|---|---|---|---|---|---|---|---|---|
| 1 | Thailand | 3 | 2 | 1 | 7 | 8 | 5 | 1.600 | 301 | 284 | 1.060 | Classification for 1–12 |
| 2 | China | 3 | 2 | 1 | 6 | 8 | 6 | 1.333 | 313 | 301 | 1.040 | Classification for 1–12 |
| 3 | Sri Lanka | 3 | 1 | 2 | 3 | 5 | 6 | 0.833 | 240 | 244 | 0.984 | Classification for 13–20 |
| 4 | Vietnam | 3 | 1 | 2 | 2 | 4 | 8 | 0.500 | 260 | 285 | 0.912 | Classification for 13–20 |

Source: OCA

| Date | Time | | Score | | Set 1 | Set 2 | Set 3 | Set 4 | Set 5 | Total | Report |
|---|---|---|---|---|---|---|---|---|---|---|---|
| 20 Aug | 10:00 | China | 2–3 | Vietnam | 23–25 | 24–26 | 25–19 | 25–22 | 19–21 | 116–113 | Report |
| 22 Aug | 16:30 | China | 3–2 | Thailand | 12–25 | 17–25 | 31–29 | 25–23 | 17–15 | 102–117 | Report |
| 25 Aug | 10:00 | Sri Lanka | 1–3 | China | 15–25 | 25–20 | 14–25 | 17–25 | | 71–95 | Report |
| 26 Aug | 16:30 | Iran | 3–0 | China | 27–25 | 25–20 | 25–21 | | | 77–66 | Report |
| 30 Aug | 12:30 | China | 2–3 | Pakistan | 25–17 | 26–28 | 30–28 | 19–25 | 16–18 | 116–116 | Report |
| 31 Aug | 14:30 | Saudi Arabia | 0–3 | China | 15–25 | 10–25 | 17–25 | | | 42–75 | Report |

==== Women's tournament ====
Team roster

The following is the Chinese roster in the women's volleyball tournament of the 2018 Asian Games.

Head coach: Lang Ping

| No. | Name | Date of birth | Height | Weight | Spike | Block | Club |
|---|---|---|---|---|---|---|---|
| 1 | Yuan Xinyue | 21 December 1996 | 2.01 m (6 ft 7 in) | 78 kg (172 lb) | 317 cm (125 in) | 311 cm (122 in) | (China) Bayi Shenzhen |
| 2 | Zhu Ting (C) | 29 November 1994 | 1.98 m (6 ft 6 in) | 78 kg (172 lb) | 327 cm (129 in) | 300 cm (120 in) | (Turkey) VakıfBank |
| 6 | Gong Xiangyu | 21 April 1997 | 1.88 m (6 ft 2 in) | 72 kg (159 lb) | 313 cm (123 in) | 302 cm (119 in) | (China) Jiangsu Zenith Steel |
| 8 | Zeng Chunlei | 3 November 1989 | 1.87 m (6 ft 2 in) | 67 kg (148 lb) | 315 cm (124 in) | 315 cm (124 in) | (China) Beijing Baic Auto |
| 10 | Liu Xiaotong | 16 February 1990 | 1.88 m (6 ft 2 in) | 80 kg (180 lb) | 312 cm (123 in) | 300 cm (120 in) | (China) Beijing Baic Auto |
| 11 | Yao Di | 15 August 1992 | 1.82 m (6 ft 0 in) | 65 kg (143 lb) | 306 cm (120 in) | 298 cm (117 in) | (China) Tianjin Bohai Bank |
| 12 | Li Yingying | 19 February 2000 | 1.92 m (6 ft 4 in) | 78 kg (172 lb) | 305 cm (120 in) | 300 cm (120 in) | (China) Tianjin Bohai Bank |
| 13 | Diao Linyu | 7 April 1994 | 1.82 m (6 ft 0 in) | 69 kg (152 lb) | 309 cm (122 in) | 303 cm (119 in) | (China) Jiangsu Zenith Steel |
| 15 | Lin Li | 5 July 1992 | 1.72 m (5 ft 8 in) | 65 kg (143 lb) | 294 cm (116 in) | 294 cm (116 in) | (China) Fujian Xi Meng Bao |
| 16 | Ding Xia | 13 January 1990 | 1.80 m (5 ft 11 in) | 67 kg (148 lb) | 305 cm (120 in) | 300 cm (120 in) | (China) Liaoning Brilliance Auto |
| 17 | Yan Ni | 2 March 1987 | 1.92 m (6 ft 4 in) | 74 kg (163 lb) | 317 cm (125 in) | 306 cm (120 in) | (China) Liaoning Brilliance Auto |
| 18 | Wang Mengjie | 14 November 1995 | 1.75 m (5 ft 9 in) | 65 kg (143 lb) | 289 cm (114 in) | 280 cm (110 in) | (China) Shandong Sports Lottery |
| 20 | Duan Fang | 26 December 1994 | 1.88 m (6 ft 2 in) | 72 kg (159 lb) | 305 cm (120 in) | 295 cm (116 in) | (China) Liaoning Brilliance Auto |
| 25 | Hu Mingyuan | 17 May 1996 | 1.86 m (6 ft 1 in) | 72 kg (159 lb) | 290 cm (110 in) | 285 cm (112 in) | (China) Liaoning Brilliance Auto |

Pool B

| Pos | Team | Pld | W | L | Pts | SW | SL | SR | SPW | SPL | SPR | Qualification |
|---|---|---|---|---|---|---|---|---|---|---|---|---|
| 1 | China | 5 | 5 | 0 | 15 | 15 | 0 | MAX | 375 | 216 | 1.736 | Quarterfinals |
| 2 | South Korea | 5 | 4 | 1 | 12 | 12 | 4 | 3.000 | 382 | 299 | 1.278 | Quarterfinals |
| 3 | Kazakhstan | 5 | 2 | 3 | 7 | 9 | 10 | 0.900 | 386 | 406 | 0.951 | Quarterfinals |
| 4 | Vietnam | 5 | 2 | 3 | 6 | 8 | 11 | 0.727 | 369 | 406 | 0.909 | Quarterfinals |
| 5 | Chinese Taipei | 5 | 2 | 3 | 4 | 7 | 13 | 0.538 | 370 | 441 | 0.839 | Classification for 9–11 |
| 6 | India | 5 | 0 | 5 | 1 | 2 | 15 | 0.133 | 292 | 406 | 0.719 | Classification for 9–11 |

Source: OCA

| Date | Time | | Score | | Set 1 | Set 2 | Set 3 | Set 4 | Set 5 | Total | Report |
|---|---|---|---|---|---|---|---|---|---|---|---|
| 19 Aug | 10:00 | China | 3–0 | Vietnam | 25–11 | 25–15 | 25–13 | | | 75–39 | Report |
| 21 Aug | 16:30 | China | 3–0 | Chinese Taipei | 25–10 | 25–14 | 25–14 | | | 75–38 | Report |
| 23 Aug | 16:30 | South Korea | 0–3 | China | 21–25 | 16–25 | 16–25 | | | 53–75 | Report |
| 25 Aug | 16:30 | Kazakhstan | 0–3 | China | 14–25 | 15–25 | 11–25 | | | 40–75 | Report |
| 27 Aug | 12:00 | China | 3–0 | India | 25–18 | 25–19 | 25–9 | | | 75–46 | Report |
| 29 Aug | 19:00 | Philippines | 0–3 | China | 15–25 | 9–25 | 7–25 | | | 31–75 | Report |
| 31 Aug | 19:30 | China | 3–0 | Japan | 25–22 | 25–10 | 25–20 | | | 75–52 | Report |
| 01 Sep | 16:30 | Thailand | 0–3 | China | 19–25 | 17–25 | 13–25 | | | 49–75 | Report |

== Water polo ==
Summary

Key:

- FT – After full time.
- P – Match decided by penalty-shootout.

| Team | Event | Group Stage | | | | | | Quarterfinal | Semifinal / Pl. | Final / BM / Pl. | |
| Team | Event | Opposition Score | Opposition Score | Opposition Score | Opposition Score | Opposition Score | Rank | Opposition Score | Opposition Score | Opposition Score | Rank |
|---|---|---|---|---|---|---|---|---|---|---|---|
| China men's | Men's tournament | Japan; L 4–12 | Indonesia; W 19–2 | Hong Kong; W 23–3 | Saudi Arabia; W 17–5 | —N/a | 2 Q | South Korea; W 12–4 | Kazakhstan; L 8–9 | Iran; L 15–16 | 4 |
| China women's | Women's tournament | Kazakhstan; W 11–4 | Japan; W 12–8 | Indonesia; W 20–4 | Thailand; W 17–5 | Hong Kong; W 16–3 | 1 | —N/a | | | 1st place, gold medalist(s) |

=== Men's tournament ===
Team roster

Head coach: (Montenegro) Petar Porobić

1. Wu Honghui (GK) (C)
2. Liu Xiao (D)
3. Peng Jiahao (−)
4. Chu Chenghao (CF)
5. Sha Shi (CB)
6. Xie Zekai (D)
7. Chen Zhongxian (D)
8. Chen Rui (CB)
9. Chen Yimin (D)
10. Chen Jinghao (D)
11. Zhang Chufeng (D)
12. Zhu Gelin (D)
13. Liang Zhiwei (GK)

Group B

| Pos | Team | Pld | W | D | L | GF | GA | GD | Pts | Qualification |
|---|---|---|---|---|---|---|---|---|---|---|
| 1 | Japan | 4 | 4 | 0 | 0 | 79 | 15 | +64 | 8 | Quarterfinals |
| 2 | China | 4 | 3 | 0 | 1 | 63 | 22 | +41 | 6 | Quarterfinals |
| 3 | Saudi Arabia | 4 | 1 | 1 | 2 | 33 | 55 | −22 | 3 (Note: Head-to-head result: KSA 12–12 INA. Goal difference against the highest placed team (JPN): KSA −16, INA −17.) | Quarterfinals |
| 4 | Indonesia | 4 | 1 | 1 | 2 | 32 | 63 | −31 | 3 | Quarterfinals |
| 5 | Hong Kong | 4 | 0 | 0 | 4 | 17 | 69 | −52 | 0 | |

Source: OCA
Notes:

| 25 August; 16:20 | Japan | 12–4 | China | Gelora Bung Karno Aquatic Stadium, Jakarta; Referees: Stavridis (GRE), Alexandrescu (ROU) |
| 25 August; 16:20 | Score by quarters: 2–1, 4–0, 3–1, 3–2 | | | Gelora Bung Karno Aquatic Stadium, Jakarta; Referees: Stavridis (GRE), Alexandrescu (ROU) |
| 25 August; 16:20 | Adachi 3 | Goals | four players 1 | Gelora Bung Karno Aquatic Stadium, Jakarta; Referees: Stavridis (GRE), Alexandrescu (ROU) |

| 26 August; 14:30 | Indonesia | 2–19 | China | Gelora Bung Karno Aquatic Stadium, Jakarta; Referees: Tan (SGP), Flahive (AUS) |
| 26 August; 14:30 | Score by quarters: 0–4, 0–6, 0–4, 2–5 | | | Gelora Bung Karno Aquatic Stadium, Jakarta; Referees: Tan (SGP), Flahive (AUS) |
| 26 August; 14:30 | Firdaus, Manik 1 | Goals | Chen Z. 5 | Gelora Bung Karno Aquatic Stadium, Jakarta; Referees: Tan (SGP), Flahive (AUS) |

| 27 August; 15:50 | China | 23–3 | Hong Kong | Gelora Bung Karno Aquatic Stadium, Jakarta; Referees: Flahive (AUS), Pranolo (INA) |
| 27 August; 15:50 | Score by quarters: 7–0, 6–2, 5–0, 5–1 | | | Gelora Bung Karno Aquatic Stadium, Jakarta; Referees: Flahive (AUS), Pranolo (INA) |
| 27 August; 15:50 | four players 3 | Goals | Cheng H.M. 3 | Gelora Bung Karno Aquatic Stadium, Jakarta; Referees: Flahive (AUS), Pranolo (INA) |

| 28 August; 15:50 | China | 17–5 | Saudi Arabia | Gelora Bung Karno Aquatic Stadium, Jakarta; Referees: Safabakhsh (IRI), Salnichenko (KAZ) |
| 28 August; 15:50 | Score by quarters: 4–0, 2–1, 6–1, 5–3 | | | Gelora Bung Karno Aquatic Stadium, Jakarta; Referees: Safabakhsh (IRI), Salnichenko (KAZ) |
| 28 August; 15:50 | Liu, Sha, Zhang 3 | Goals | Al-Dughather, Al-Malki 2 | Gelora Bung Karno Aquatic Stadium, Jakarta; Referees: Safabakhsh (IRI), Salnichenko (KAZ) |

Quarter-final

| 30 August; 10:20 | South Korea | 4–12 | China | Gelora Bung Karno Aquatic Stadium, Jakarta; Referees: Flahive (AUS), Safabakhsh (IRI) |
| 30 August; 10:20 | Score by quarters: 1–3, 1–2, 1–5, 1–2 | | | Gelora Bung Karno Aquatic Stadium, Jakarta; Referees: Flahive (AUS), Safabakhsh (IRI) |
| 30 August; 10:20 | Chu 2 | Goals | Chen Z. 4 | Gelora Bung Karno Aquatic Stadium, Jakarta; Referees: Flahive (AUS), Safabakhsh (IRI) |

Semifinal

| 31 August; 17:20 | China | 8–9 | Kazakhstan | Gelora Bung Karno Aquatic Stadium, Jakarta; Referees: Štampalija (CRO), Alexandrescu (ROU) |
| 31 August; 17:20 | Score by quarters: 1–3, 3–1, 2–4, 2–1 | | | Gelora Bung Karno Aquatic Stadium, Jakarta; Referees: Štampalija (CRO), Alexandrescu (ROU) |
| 31 August; 17:20 | Chen Z. 3 | Goals | Shmider 3 | Gelora Bung Karno Aquatic Stadium, Jakarta; Referees: Štampalija (CRO), Alexandrescu (ROU) |

Bronze medal game

| 1 September; 16:00 | Iran | 16–15 (PSO) | China | Gelora Bung Karno Aquatic Stadium, Jakarta; Referees: Stavridis (GRE), Alexandrescu (ROU) |
| 1 September; 16:00 | Score by quarters: 1–3, 4–2, 2–1, 1–2 PSO: 8–7 | | | Gelora Bung Karno Aquatic Stadium, Jakarta; Referees: Stavridis (GRE), Alexandrescu (ROU) |
| 1 September; 16:00 | Malek-Khanbanan 4 | Goals | Chen Z. 6 | Gelora Bung Karno Aquatic Stadium, Jakarta; Referees: Stavridis (GRE), Alexandrescu (ROU) |

=== Women's tournament ===
Team roster

Head coach: Gong Dali

1. Peng Lin (GK)
2. Zhai Ying (D)
3. Mei Xiaohan (CB) (C)
4. Xiong Dunhan (CF)
5. Niu Guannan (D)
6. Guo Ning (D)
7. Nong Sanfeng (CB)
8. Zhang Cong (D)
9. Wang Huan (CB)
10. Zhang Danyi (D)
11. Chen Xiao (CF)
12. Zhang Jing (D)
13. Shen Yineng (GK)

Round robin

| Pos | Team | Pld | W | D | L | GF | GA | GD | Pts |
|---|---|---|---|---|---|---|---|---|---|
| 1 | China | 5 | 5 | 0 | 0 | 76 | 24 | +52 | 10 |
| 2 | Kazakhstan | 5 | 4 | 0 | 1 | 70 | 34 | +36 | 8 |
| 3 | Japan | 5 | 3 | 0 | 2 | 84 | 36 | +48 | 6 |
| 4 | Thailand | 5 | 2 | 0 | 3 | 53 | 62 | −9 | 4 |
| 5 | Indonesia | 5 | 1 | 0 | 4 | 30 | 82 | −52 | 2 |
| 6 | Hong Kong | 5 | 0 | 0 | 5 | 22 | 97 | −75 | 0 |

Source: OCA

| 16 August; 17:10 | China | 11–4 | Kazakhstan | Gelora Bung Karno Aquatic Stadium, Jakarta; Referees: Stavridis (GRE), Štampalija (CRO) |
| 16 August; 17:10 | Score by quarters: 3–1, 4–1, 2–1, 2–1 | | | Gelora Bung Karno Aquatic Stadium, Jakarta; Referees: Stavridis (GRE), Štampalija (CRO) |
| 16 August; 17:10 | Xiong, Zhang J. 2 | Goals | Roga 2 | Gelora Bung Karno Aquatic Stadium, Jakarta; Referees: Stavridis (GRE), Štampalija (CRO) |

| 17 August; 17:10 | Japan | 8–12 | China | Gelora Bung Karno Aquatic Stadium, Jakarta; Referees: Flahive (AUS), Stavridis (GRE) |
| 17 August; 17:10 | Score by quarters: 0–3, 1–3, 3–2, 4–4 | | | Gelora Bung Karno Aquatic Stadium, Jakarta; Referees: Flahive (AUS), Stavridis (GRE) |
| 17 August; 17:10 | four players 2 | Goals | Xiong, Zhang J. 3 | Gelora Bung Karno Aquatic Stadium, Jakarta; Referees: Flahive (AUS), Stavridis (GRE) |

| 19 August; 15:50 | China | 20–4 | Indonesia | Gelora Bung Karno Aquatic Stadium, Jakarta; Referees: Jiathornwattana (THA), Salnichenko (KAZ) |
| 19 August; 15:50 | Score by quarters: 7–0, 7–3, 3–1, 3–0 | | | Gelora Bung Karno Aquatic Stadium, Jakarta; Referees: Jiathornwattana (THA), Salnichenko (KAZ) |
| 19 August; 15:50 | Xiong, Zhang D., Chen 3 | Goals | Siwabessy 2 | Gelora Bung Karno Aquatic Stadium, Jakarta; Referees: Jiathornwattana (THA), Salnichenko (KAZ) |

| 20 August; 17:10 | China | 17–5 | Thailand | Gelora Bung Karno Aquatic Stadium, Jakarta; Referees: Tan (SGP), Pranolo (INA) |
| 20 August; 17:10 | Score by quarters: 3–0, 5–2, 6–1, 3–2 | | | Gelora Bung Karno Aquatic Stadium, Jakarta; Referees: Tan (SGP), Pranolo (INA) |
| 20 August; 17:10 | Chen X. 5 | Goals | Rewrujirek 2 | Gelora Bung Karno Aquatic Stadium, Jakarta; Referees: Tan (SGP), Pranolo (INA) |

| 21 August; 15:50 | Hong Kong | 3–16 | China | Gelora Bung Karno Aquatic Stadium, Jakarta; Referees: Tahara (JPN), Han (KOR) |
| 21 August; 15:50 | Score by quarters: 1–4, 0–4, 0–4, 2–4 | | | Gelora Bung Karno Aquatic Stadium, Jakarta; Referees: Tahara (JPN), Han (KOR) |
| 21 August; 15:50 | Chan, Ng, Lau K. 1 | Goals | Xiong 4 | Gelora Bung Karno Aquatic Stadium, Jakarta; Referees: Tahara (JPN), Han (KOR) |

== Weightlifting ==
China has prepared 14 weightlifters to compete at the Games, but the athletes not allowed to compete due to the International Weightlifting Federation’s (IWF) ban on the country.

== Wrestling ==
China took 6 medals (2 gold, 1 silver, and 3 bronze) at the competition. The gold medals won by Zhou Feng who was a gold medalist in the freestyle −75 kg 2014 Asian Games, and the other one won by Zhou Qian.

Key:

- F – Victory by fall.
- PP – Decision by points – the loser with technical points.
- PO – Decision by points – the loser without technical points.
- ST – Great superiority – the loser without technical points and a margin of victory of at least 8 (Greco-Roman) or 10 (freestyle) points.

Men's freestyle

| Athlete | Event | Qualification | Round of 16 | Quarterfinal | Semifinal | Repechage 1 | Repechage 2 | Final / BM | |
| Athlete | Event | Opposition Result | Opposition Result | Opposition Result | Opposition Result | Opposition Result | Opposition Result | Opposition Result | Rank |
|---|---|---|---|---|---|---|---|---|---|
| Liu Minghu | −57 kg | Bye | M Al-Maghrebi (YEM); WO | E Saputra (INA); W 10–5 | Kang K-s (PRK); L 0–10 | Bye | | Y Takahashi (JPN); L 3–3 ^{PP} | 5 |
| Yeerlanbieke Katai | −65 kg | M Nassiri (IRI); W 8–7 | A Osmonov (KGZ); W 13–4 | S Okassov (KAZ); L 5–9 | Did not advance | | | | 7 |
| Wu Wei | −74 kg | G Mandakhnaran (MGL); L 4–8 | Did not advance | | | | | | 12 |
| Bi Shengfeng | −86 kg | O Üitümen (MGL); L 6–3^{F} | Did not advance | | | | | | 10 |
| Yang Chaoqiang | −97 kg | —N/a | M Musaev (KGZ); L 0–10 | Did not advance | | —N/a | Did not advance | | 12 |
| Deng Zhiwei | −125 kg | —N/a | Bye | T Raza (PAK); W 10–0 | Nam K-j (KOR); W 6^{F}–0 | —N/a | Bye | P Hadi (IRI); L 0–7 | 2nd place, silver medalist(s) |

Men's Greco-Roman

| Athlete | Event | Round of 16 | Quarterfinal | Semifinal | Repechage | Final / BM | |
| Athlete | Event | Opposition Result | Opposition Result | Opposition Result | Opposition Result | Opposition Result | Rank |
|---|---|---|---|---|---|---|---|
| Walihan Sailike | −60 kg | G Al-Sabri (YEM); W 9–0 | Zholchubekov (KGZ); L 1–6 | Did not advance | Ri S-u (PRK); L 0–9 | Did not advance | 7 |
| Zhang Gaoquan | −67 kg | M Akhmedov (TJK); W 7–6 | M Aliansyah (INA); W 7–0 | Ryu H-s (KOR); L 0–2 | Bye | A Ismailov (KGZ); L 1–6 | 5 |
| Yang Bin | −77 kg | M Geraei (IRI); L 0–8 | Did not advance | | G Singh (IND); W 9–1 ^{C} | S Yabiku (JPN); W 4–3 | 3rd place, bronze medalist(s) |
| Peng Fei | −87 kg | M Sumi (JPN); L 1–3 | Did not advance | | | | 10 |
| Xiao Di | −97 kg | J Turdiev (UZB); W 4–0 | H Singh (IND); W 3–3 ^{PP} | Dzhuzupbekov (KGZ); W 8^{F}–1 | Bye | Cho H-c (KOR); L 4–5 | 2nd place, silver medalist(s) |
| Meng Lingzhe | −130 kg | N Kumar (IND); W 4–1 | B Mehdizadeh (IRI); L 0–5^{F} | Did not advance | | | 7 |

Women's freestyle

| Athlete | Event | Round of 16 | Quarterfinal | Semifinal | Repechage | Final / BM | |
| Athlete | Event | Opposition Result | Opposition Result | Opposition Result | Opposition Result | Opposition Result | Rank |
|---|---|---|---|---|---|---|---|
| Sun Yanan | −50 kg | V Phogat (IND); L 2–8 | Did not advance | | Kim H-j (KOR); L 0–4^{F} | Did not advance | 9 |
| Pang Qianyu | −53 kg | Bye | H Okuno (JPN); L 1–4 | Did not advance | | | 11 |
| Pei Xingru | −57 kg | Bye | Um J-e (KOR); W 5^{F}–4 | A Battsetseg (MGL); W 4–1 | Bye | Jong M-s (PRK); L 4–5 | 2nd place, silver medalist(s) |
| Xu Rui | −62 kg | Bye | A Tynybekova (KGZ); L 0–3 | Did not advance | Rim J-s (PRK); L 0–10 | Did not advance | 11 |
| Zhou Feng | −68 kg | S Sultana (BAN); W 5^{F}–0 | A Gempei (JPN); W 6–3 | M Zhumanazarova (KGZ); W 9^{F}–2 | Bye | S Tümentsetseg (MGL); W 4–1 | 1st place, gold medalist(s) |
| Zhou Qian | −76 kg | Bye | E Syzdykova (KAZ); W 10^{F}–0 | Hwang E-j (KOR); W 10–0 | —N/a | H Minagawa (JPN); W 8–0 | 1st place, gold medalist(s) |

== Wushu ==
Taolu

| Athlete | Event | Event 1 | | Event 2 | | Total | Rank |
| Athlete | Event | Result | Rank | Result | Rank | Total | Rank |
|---|---|---|---|---|---|---|---|
| Sun Peiyuan | Men's changquan | 9.75 | 1 | —N/a | | 9.75 | 1st place, gold medalist(s) |
| Li Jingde | Men's nanquan and nangun | 9.75 | 1 | 9.39 | 16 | 19.14 | 11 |
| Chen Zhouli | Men's taijiquan and taijijian | 9.75 | 1 | 9.76 | 1 | 19.51 | 1st place, gold medalist(s) |
| Wu Zhaohua | Men's daoshu and gunshu | 9.76 | 1 | 9.76 | 1 | 19.52 | 1st place, gold medalist(s) |
| Qi Xinyi | Women's changquan | 9.74 | 1 | —N/a | | 9.74 | 1st place, gold medalist(s) |
| Tang Lu | Women's nanquan and nandao | 9.75 | 1 | 9.74 | 1 | 19.74 | 1st place, gold medalist(s) |
| Guo Menjiao | Women's jianshu and qiangshu | 9.75 | 1 | 9.74 | 1 | 19.49 | 1st place, gold medalist(s) |

Sanda

| Athlete | Event | Round of 32 | Round of 16 | Quarterfinal | Semifinal | Final | |
| Athlete | Event | Opposition Score | Opposition Score | Opposition Score | Opposition Score | Opposition Score | Rank |
|---|---|---|---|---|---|---|---|
| Shen Guoshun | Men's –56 kg | Bye | Kan K W (MAC); W 1–0 | A Amanbekov (KGZ); W 0–0 ^{TV} | Y Widiyanto (INA); W 2–0 | Bùi T G (VIE); W 2–0 | 1st place, gold medalist(s) |
| Wang Xuetao | Men's –60 kg | Bye | N Sudiqi (AFG); W 2–0 | R Ibragimov (KGZ); W 0–0 ^{TV} | Nghiêm V Ý (VIE); W 0–0 ^{TV} | E Ahangarian (IRI); L 1–2 | 2nd place, silver medalist(s) |
| Li Mengfan | Men's –65 kg | —N/a | Bye | Park S-m (KOR); W 2–1 | K Hotak (AFG); W 2–0 | F Zafari (IRI); W 2–0 | 1st place, gold medalist(s) |
| Shi Zhanwei | Men's –70 kg | —N/a | Bye | M Khan (PAK); W 2–0 | P Riyaya (INA); W 2–0 | M Mohammadseifi (IRI); L 0–2 | 2nd place, silver medalist(s) |
| Li Yueyao | Women's –52 kg | —N/a | Bye | K Siriluk (THA); W 0–0 ^{TV} | Chen W-t (TPE); W 0–0 ^{TV} | E Mansourian (IRI); L 0–2 | 2nd place, silver medalist(s) |
| Cai Yingying | Women's –60 kg | —N/a | Bye | M Kurniati (INA); W 2–0 | R Naorem (IND); W 1–0 | S Mansourian (IRI); W 2–0 | 1st place, gold medalist(s) |

Key: * TV – Technical victory.

== See also ==
- China at the 2018 Asian Para Games
