= Baseball at the 2014 Asian Games =

- Venue: Munhak Baseball Stadium; Mokdong Baseball Stadium
- Dates: 22–28 September 2014
- Competitors: 173 from 8 nations

Baseball at the 2014 Asian Games was held in Incheon, South Korea from September 22 to 28, 2014. Only a men's competition was held. All games were played at the Munhak Baseball Stadium and the Mokdong Baseball Stadium.

== Schedule ==
P	Preliminary round	½	Semifinals	F	Finals

Event↓/Date →	22nd Mon	23rd Tue	24th Wed	25th Thu	26th Fri	27th Sat	28th Sun
Men	P	P	P	P		½	F

== Medalists ==
Event	Gold	Silver	Bronze
Men	South Korea; An Ji-man; Kim Min-sung; Kim Sang-su; Lee Jae-hak; Lim Chang-yong; Hwang Jae-gyun; Kang Jung-ho; Oh Jae-won; Lee Jae-won; Yoo Won-sang; Lee Tae-yang; Cha Woo-chan; Na Ji-wan; Kim Kwang-hyun; Son Ah-seop; Hong Seong-moo; Kang Min-ho; Na Sung-bum; Min Byung-hun; Kim Hyun-soo; Bong Jung-keun; Park Byung-ho; Yang Hyeon-jong; Han Hyun-hee	Chinese Taipei; Yang Hsien-hsien; Yu Meng-hsiung; Lin Ken-wei; Hsiao Po-ting; Wang Po-jung; Chen Pin-chieh; Chiang Chih-hsien; Lin Yi-hsiang; Chen Kuan-yu; Hu Chih-wei; Cheng Kai-wen; Lin Kun-sheng; Kuo Yen-wen; Wang Yao-lin; Chu Li-jen; Chen Chun-hsiu; Pan Chih-fang; Sung Chia-hao; Lo Kuo-hua; Jhang Jin-de; Lo Chia-jen; Chiang Shao-ching; Kuo Chun-lin; Lin Han	Japan; Takuya Fujishima; Issei Endo; Shun Ishikawa; Masahiro Nishino; Ryota Ishioka; Yuichi Tabata; Ken Tanaka; Toshihiko Kuramoto; Yusuke Ueda; Masataka Iryo; Tetsu Yokota; Takayuki Kato; Tsukasa Komatsu; Koshiro Imamura; Reo Moriyasu; Katsutoshi Satake; Takuaki Iguchi; Ryota Sekiya; Takeshi Kunimoto; Akira Matsumoto; Toshiyuki Hayashi; Shigeki Nakano; Taihei Fukuda; Ryota Ito

== Draw ==
The teams were distributed according to their position at the IBAF World Rankings.

Group A

- Japan
- China
- Pakistan
- Mongolia

Group B

- Chinese Taipei
- South Korea
- Thailand
- Hong Kong

== Squads ==
Squads

China	Chinese Taipei	Hong Kong	Japan
Meng Weiqiang; Yang Haifan; Tang Wei; Liu Yu; Zhai Yuankai; Li Xin; Du Xiaolei; Sun Jianzeng; Yang Shunyi; Ran Song; Li Ziliang; Zhang Haoyue; Li Shuai; Zhang Xiang; Meng Qingyuan; Cui Xiao; Chen Hao; Wang Kai; Dong Wei; Luo Xia; Qi Jiping; Wang Wei; Lu Yi; Na Chuang	Yang Hsien-hsien; Yu Meng-hsiung; Lin Ken-wei; Hsiao Po-ting; Wang Po-jung; Chen Pin-chieh; Chiang Chih-hsien; Lin Yi-hsiang; Chen Kuan-yu; Hu Chih-wei; Cheng Kai-wen; Lin Kun-sheng; Kuo Yen-wen; Wang Yao-lin; Chu Li-jen; Chen Chun-hsiu; Pan Chih-fang; Sung Chia-hao; Lo Kuo-hua; Jhang Jin-de; Lo Chia-jen; Chiang Shao-ching; Kuo Chun-lin; Lin Han	Ting Chu Pok; Chan Ting Wai; Enroy Chiu; Andy Lo; Leung Ho Yin; Nip Tin Ching; Matthew Lai; Leung Yu Chung; Wong Ho Fung; Yung Tsun Wai; Leung Chung Hei; Yip Hing Long; Benny Tam; Sam Leung; Ng Yuk Ming; Mok Wing Tung; Wu Chun Yeung; Li Wing Sing; Tony Wu; Clement Fong; Leung Ho Nam; Tsang Kin Chung; Ng Yau Pang; Kwong Chi Kit	Takuya Fujishima; Issei Endo; Shun Ishikawa; Masahiro Nishino; Ryota Ishioka; Yuichi Tabata; Ken Tanaka; Toshihiko Kuramoto; Yusuke Ueda; Masataka Iryo; Tetsu Yokota; Takayuki Kato; Tsukasa Komatsu; Koshiro Imamura; Reo Moriyasu; Katsutoshi Satake; Takuaki Iguchi; Ryota Sekiya; Takeshi Kunimoto; Akira Matsumoto; Toshiyuki Hayashi; Shigeki Nakano; Taihei Fukuda; Ryota Ito
Mongolia	Pakistan	South Korea	Thailand
Bat-Ochiryn Dechinsüren; Oyuunbaataryn Önöbold; Davaagiin Pürevkhishig; Baasanjavyn Erdenebulag; Bayarmaagiin Mönkh-Ochir; Mönkhbatyn Battushig; Tsolmongiin Batzul; Lkhagvatserengiin Narmandakh; Ölziibayaryn Javkhlan; Ganboldyn Gan-Erdene; Dashzevegiin Mönkhbat; Batsaikhany Baasandorj; Sengeegiin Pürevjav	Tariq Nadeem; Muhammad Waqas Ismail; Atif Dar; Muhammad Sumair Zawar; Muhammad Abubakar Siddiqui; Dur-i-Hussain; Khurram Raza Khan; Muhammad Usman; Zubair Nawaz; Umair Imdad Bhatti; Adil Sardar; Muhammad Ahsan Baig; Fazal-ur-Rehman; Burhan Johar; Adnan Butt; Nasir Nadeem Butt	An Ji-man; Kim Min-sung; Kim Sang-su; Lee Jae-hak; Lim Chang-yong; Hwang Jae-gyun; Kang Jung-ho; Oh Jae-won; Lee Jae-won; Yoo Won-sang; Lee Tae-yang; Cha Woo-chan; Na Ji-wan; Kim Kwang-hyun; Son Ah-seop; Hong Seong-moo; Kang Min-ho; Na Sung-bum; Min Byung-hun; Kim Hyun-soo; Bong Jung-keun; Park Byung-ho; Yang Hyeon-jong; Han Hyun-hee	Akaradech Jitpong; Pongpun Yoopongpitak; Mukkapol Subsulekun; Adichat Wongvichit; Sek Sitthikaew; Phanuwat Sukmuang; Nirun Jaroenkitsiriwong; Alex Clark; Naruephol Maungkasem; Chayaphat Suanthong; Wissaroot Sihamat; Siraphop Nadee; Sakai Phraechai; Teerasak Kongsabai; Yannapat Arpornsiri; Chanatip Thongbai; Papat Yoosamran; Wasan Sorahong; Kritsana Thongoon; Jack Daru; Joe Daru; Kamolphan Kanjanavisut; Phoomwut Wutthikorn; Sanyalak Pipatpinyo

== Results ==
All times are Korea Standard Time (UTC+09:00)

=== Preliminary round ===
==== Group A ====
Pos	Team	Pld	W	L	RF	RA	PCT	GB	Qualification
1	Japan	3	3	0	41	1	1.000	—	Semifinals
2	China	3	2	1	21	11	.667	1	Semifinals
3	Pakistan	3	1	2	26	15	.333	2	
4	Mongolia	3	0	3	0	61	.000	3	

Source: BFA

22 September; 18:30	Japan	11–0 (F/7)	China	Mokdong Baseball Stadium, Seoul; Umpires: Park Seong-jun (KOR)
22 September; 18:30	WP: Tsukasa Komatsu	Boxscore	LP: Li Xin	Mokdong Baseball Stadium, Seoul; Umpires: Park Seong-jun (KOR)

Team	1	2	3	4	5	6	7	8	9	R	H	E
China	0	0	0	0	0	0	0	—	—	0	5	1
Japan	3	3	1	0	0	4	X	—	—	11	12	0

23 September; 12:30	China	15–0 (F/5)	Mongolia	Munhak Baseball Stadium, Incheon; Umpires: Kim Jae-young (KOR)
23 September; 12:30	WP: Li Ziliang	Boxscore	LP: Dashzevegiin Mönkhbat	Munhak Baseball Stadium, Incheon; Umpires: Kim Jae-young (KOR)

Team	1	2	3	4	5	6	7	8	9	R	H	E
Mongolia	0	0	0	0	0	—	—	—	—	0	0	5
China	0	1	7	3	4	—	—	—	—	15	8	0

23 September; 18:30	Japan	9–1	Pakistan	Munhak Baseball Stadium, Incheon; Umpires: Zhu Sheng (CHN)
23 September; 18:30	WP: Koshiro Imamura	Boxscore	LP: Tariq Nadeem	Munhak Baseball Stadium, Incheon; Umpires: Zhu Sheng (CHN)
23 September; 18:30	HR: Toshihiko Kuramoto (1)	Boxscore		Munhak Baseball Stadium, Incheon; Umpires: Zhu Sheng (CHN)

Team	1	2	3	4	5	6	7	8	9	R	H	E
Pakistan	1	0	0	0	0	0	0	0	0	1	4	1
Japan	0	1	1	2	1	1	1	2	X	9	15	0

24 September; 18:30	Pakistan	25–0 (F/5)	Mongolia	Mokdong Baseball Stadium, Seoul; Umpires: Kim Dae-nam (KOR)
24 September; 18:30	WP: Adil Sardar	Boxscore	LP: Ölziibayaryn Javkhlan	Mokdong Baseball Stadium, Seoul; Umpires: Kim Dae-nam (KOR)

Team	1	2	3	4	5	6	7	8	9	R	H	E
Mongolia	0	0	0	0	0	—	—	—	—	0	0	6
Pakistan	1	8	5	11	X	—	—	—	—	25	16	0

25 September; 12:30	Mongolia	0–21 (F/5)	Japan	Munhak Baseball Stadium, Incheon; Umpires: Hsieh Liang-kuei (TPE)
25 September; 12:30	LP: Dashzevegiin Mönkhbat	Boxscore	WP: Takayuki Kato	Munhak Baseball Stadium, Incheon; Umpires: Hsieh Liang-kuei (TPE)
25 September; 12:30		Boxscore	HR: Masahiro Nishino (1), Takeshi Kunimoto (1), Ken Tanaka (1)	Munhak Baseball Stadium, Incheon; Umpires: Hsieh Liang-kuei (TPE)

Team	1	2	3	4	5	6	7	8	9	R	H	E
Japan	2	4	6	1	8	—	—	—	—	21	18	0
Mongolia	0	0	0	0	0	—	—	—	—	0	2	4

25 September; 18:30	China	6–0	Pakistan	Munhak Baseball Stadium, Incheon; Umpires: Masataka Tomizawa (JPN)
25 September; 18:30	WP: Yang Haifan; Sv: Li Ziliang	Boxscore	LP: Tariq Nadeem	Munhak Baseball Stadium, Incheon; Umpires: Masataka Tomizawa (JPN)

Team	1	2	3	4	5	6	7	8	9	R	H	E
Pakistan	0	0	0	0	0	0	0	0	0	0	4	2
China	0	1	1	1	0	0	3	0	X	6	11	0

==== Group B ====
Pos	Team	Pld	W	L	RF	RA	PCT	GB	Qualification
1	South Korea	3	3	0	37	0	1.000	—	Semifinals
2	Chinese Taipei	3	2	1	25	11	.667	1	Semifinals
3	Thailand	3	1	2	14	35	.333	2	
4	Hong Kong	3	0	3	7	37	.000	3	

Source: BFA

22 September; 12:30	Chinese Taipei	12–0 (F/7)	Hong Kong	Munhak Baseball Stadium, Incheon; Umpires: Park Won-jung (KOR)
22 September; 12:30	WP: Lo Kuo-hua	Boxscore	LP: Li Wing Sing	Munhak Baseball Stadium, Incheon; Umpires: Park Won-jung (KOR)

Team	1	2	3	4	5	6	7	8	9	R	H	E
Hong Kong	0	0	0	0	0	0	0	—	—	0	2	1
Chinese Taipei	3	0	3	1	2	3	X	—	—	12	9	0

22 September; 18:30	South Korea	15–0 (F/5)	Thailand	Munhak Baseball Stadium, Incheon; Umpires: Akihiko Ito (JPN)
22 September; 18:30	WP: Yoo Won-sang	Boxscore	LP: Wissaroot Sihamat	Munhak Baseball Stadium, Incheon; Umpires: Akihiko Ito (JPN)

Team	1	2	3	4	5	6	7	8	9	R	H	E
Thailand	0	0	0	0	0	—	—	—	—	0	2	2
South Korea	8	0	4	3	X	—	—	—	—	15	13	0

23 September; 18:30	Chinese Taipei	13–1 (F/7)	Thailand	Mokdong Baseball Stadium, Seoul; Umpires: Kunio Zama (JPN)
23 September; 18:30	WP: Sung Chia-hao	Boxscore	LP: Phanuwat Sukmuang	Mokdong Baseball Stadium, Seoul; Umpires: Kunio Zama (JPN)

Team	1	2	3	4	5	6	7	8	9	R	H	E
Thailand	0	0	0	1	0	0	0	—	—	1	3	2
Chinese Taipei	8	5	0	0	0	0	X	—	—	13	16	0

24 September; 12:30	Thailand	13–7	Hong Kong	Munhak Baseball Stadium, Incheon; Umpires: Chen Bin-shun (TPE)
24 September; 12:30	WP: Siraphop Nadee	Boxscore	LP: Leung Yu Chung	Munhak Baseball Stadium, Incheon; Umpires: Chen Bin-shun (TPE)

Team	1	2	3	4	5	6	7	8	9	R	H	E
Hong Kong	0	2	2	1	2	0	0	0	0	7	6	3
Thailand	1	0	2	3	2	3	0	2	X	13	5	2

24 September; 18:30	South Korea	10–0 (F/8)	Chinese Taipei	Munhak Baseball Stadium, Incheon; Umpires: Akira Horii (JPN)
24 September; 18:30	WP: Cha Woo-chan	Boxscore	LP: Wang Yao-lin	Munhak Baseball Stadium, Incheon; Umpires: Akira Horii (JPN)
24 September; 18:30	HR: Kang Jung-ho (1), Oh Jae-won (1), Park Byung-ho (1)	Boxscore		Munhak Baseball Stadium, Incheon; Umpires: Akira Horii (JPN)

Team	1	2	3	4	5	6	7	8	9	R	H	E
Chinese Taipei	0	0	0	0	0	0	0	0	—	0	6	1
South Korea	7	2	0	0	0	0	0	1	—	10	14	0

25 September; 18:30	Hong Kong	0–12 (F/7)	South Korea	Mokdong Baseball Stadium, Seoul; Umpires: Feng Qifeng (CHN)
25 September; 18:30	LP: Sam Leung	Boxscore	WP: Bong Jung-keun	Mokdong Baseball Stadium, Seoul; Umpires: Feng Qifeng (CHN)
25 September; 18:30		Boxscore	HR: Min Byung-hun (1)	Mokdong Baseball Stadium, Seoul; Umpires: Feng Qifeng (CHN)

Team	1	2	3	4	5	6	7	8	9	R	H	E
South Korea	1	1	3	1	1	2	3	—	—	12	9	1
Hong Kong	0	0	0	0	0	0	0	—	—	0	2	1

=== Final round ===
Semifinals
27 September
Japan	4
Chinese Taipei	10
27 September
South Korea	7
China	2

Gold medal match
28 September
Chinese Taipei	3
South Korea	6
Bronze medal match
28 September
Japan (F/7)	10
China	0

==== Semifinals ====
27 September; 12:30	Japan	4–10	Chinese Taipei	Munhak Baseball Stadium, Incheon; Umpires: Park Hi-young (KOR)
27 September; 12:30	LP: Tetsu Yokota	Boxscore	WP: Cheng Kai-wen	Munhak Baseball Stadium, Incheon; Umpires: Park Hi-young (KOR)
27 September; 12:30		Boxscore	HR: Kuo Yen-wen (1)	Munhak Baseball Stadium, Incheon; Umpires: Park Hi-young (KOR)

Team	1	2	3	4	5	6	7	8	9	R	H	E
Chinese Taipei	0	7	3	0	0	0	0	0	0	10	11	1
Japan	1	2	0	0	0	0	0	0	1	4	6	2

27 September; 18:30	South Korea	7–2	China	Munhak Baseball Stadium, Incheon; Umpires: Akira Sakumoto (JPN)
27 September; 18:30	WP: Lee Tae-yang	Boxscore	LP: Qi Jiping	Munhak Baseball Stadium, Incheon; Umpires: Akira Sakumoto (JPN)
27 September; 18:30	HR: Kang Jung-ho (1), Park Byung-ho (1)	Boxscore		Munhak Baseball Stadium, Incheon; Umpires: Akira Sakumoto (JPN)

Team	1	2	3	4	5	6	7	8	9	R	H	E
China	0	0	1	1	0	0	0	0	0	2	5	2
South Korea	0	1	1	0	2	3	0	0	X	7	13	1

==== Bronze medal match ====
28 September; 12:30	China	0–10 (F/7)	Japan	Munhak Baseball Stadium, Incheon; Umpires: Chen Bin-shun (TPE)
28 September; 12:30	LP: Yang Haifan	Boxscore	WP: Ryota Sekiya	Munhak Baseball Stadium, Incheon; Umpires: Chen Bin-shun (TPE)

Team	1	2	3	4	5	6	7	8	9	R	H	E
Japan	0	0	0	1	2	5	2	—	—	10	15	0
China	0	0	0	0	0	0	0	—	—	0	2	0

==== Gold medal match ====
28 September; 18:30	Chinese Taipei	3–6	South Korea	Munhak Baseball Stadium, Incheon; Umpires: Akira Horii (JPN)
28 September; 18:30	LP: Chen Kuan-yu	Boxscore	WP: An Ji-man	Munhak Baseball Stadium, Incheon; Umpires: Akira Horii (JPN)

Team	1	2	3	4	5	6	7	8	9	R	H	E
South Korea	0	0	0	0	2	0	0	4	0	6	8	0
Chinese Taipei	1	0	0	0	0	2	0	0	0	3	7	1

== Final standing ==
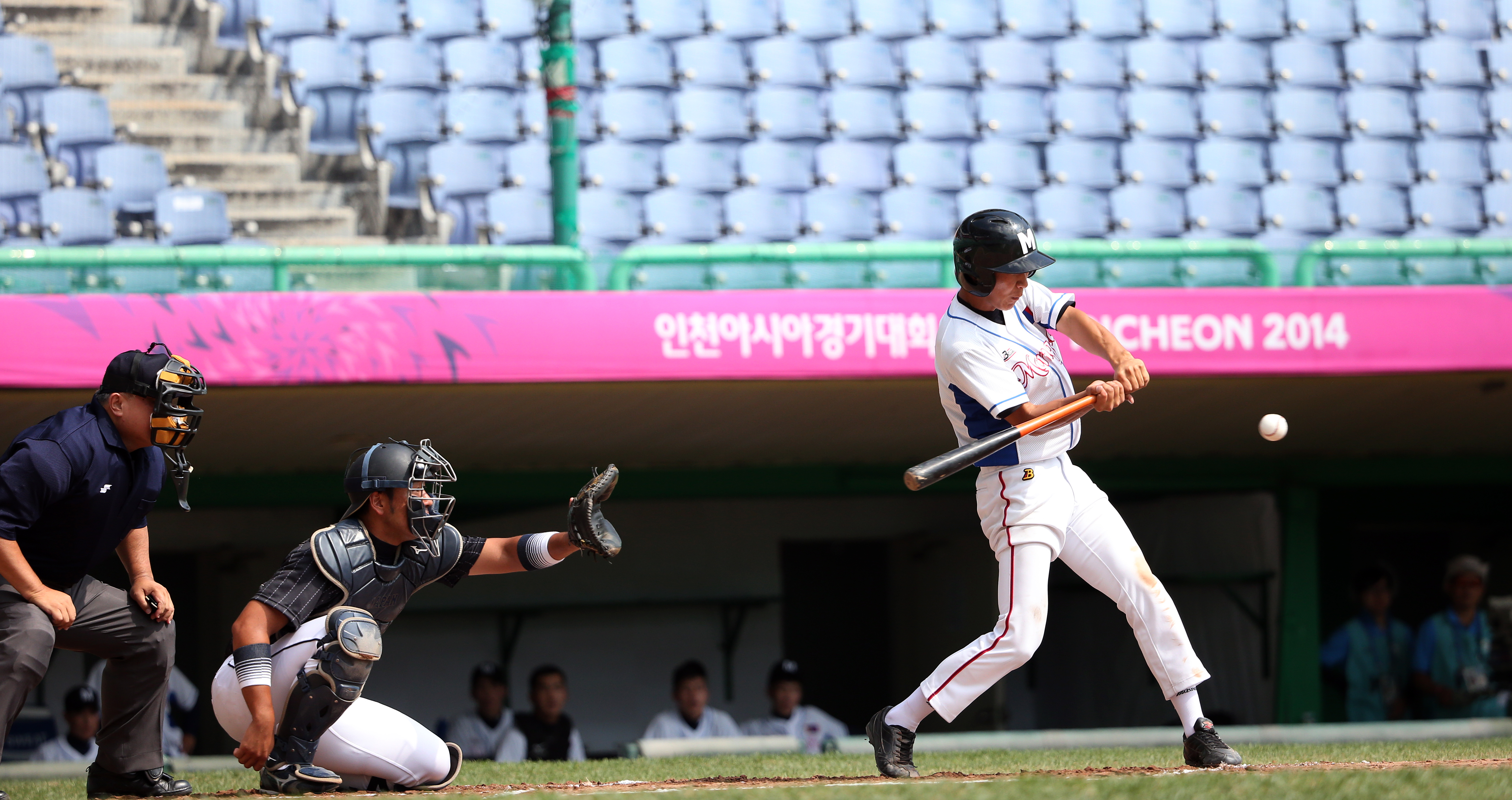
Mongolia bats against Japan

Rank	Team	Pld	W	L
1st place, gold medalist(s)	South Korea	5	5	0
2nd place, silver medalist(s)	Chinese Taipei	5	3	2
3rd place, bronze medalist(s)	Japan	5	4	1
4	China	5	2	3
5	Pakistan	3	1	2
5	Thailand	3	1	2
7	Hong Kong	3	0	3
7	Mongolia	3	0	3
