= MLB Taiwan All-Star Series =

End-of-the-season tour of Taiwan

- Frequency: Irregularly
- Location: Taiwan
- Country: United States; Canada; Taiwan
- Inaugurated: 2011
- Participants: (United States) (Canada) MLB All-Stars; Chinese Taipei national baseball team
- Organiser: Major League Baseball

The MLB Taiwan All-Star Series was an end-of-the-season tour of Taiwan made by an All-Star team from Major League Baseball (MLB) after 2011 MLB season, contested in a best-of format against the Chinese Taipei national baseball team.

The series featured many great players, such as Nori Aoki, Barry Bonds, Ken Griffey Jr., Chase Utley, Ryan Howard, Hideki Matsui, Ichiro Suzuki, Robinson Canó and Manny Ramírez.

In the beginning of all games the American and Republic of China national anthems are all played.

This series was similar set up compared with the long-standing MLB Japan All-Star Series.

Jim Small, vice president of MLB Asia appreciated the reception of Taiwan during the series and mentioned possible return in future.

== Background ==
In 2010, it was announced that MLB had agreed to hold a series of postseason baseball games at Taiwan in 2011 postseason.

The major reason behind was to capture the growth in popularity in baseball by Taiwanese after several household names playing Major League games at the beginning of the Millennium. The trend started from Chin-Feng Chen and Chin-Hui Tsao earned debut for Los Angeles Dodgers in September 2002 and July 2003 respectively. The most famous player was Washington Nationals pitcher Chien-Ming Wang who played for New York Yankees during 2005 to 2009 seasons.

In March 2010, manager Joe Torre led a Los Angeles Dodgers team that included Manny Ramirez and James Loney for a rain-truncated two game series. This was the first visit of MLB team to Taiwan in the 21st century. Taiwan-born pitcher Hong-Chih Kuo was on the Dodgers roster.

== List of series ==
Year	Format	MLB All-Stars Won	Taiwanese Baseball National Team Won	Tied	Most Valuable Player
2011	Best-of-5	5 Games	0 Games	0 Games	

== Rosters ==
The rosters were announced in October 2011.

MLB All-Stars roster
Active roster		Coaches/Other
Pitchers: 46 (United States) Jeremy Guthrie (BAL); 35 (United States) Dillon Gee (NYM); 55 (Dominican Republic) Felipe Paulino (COL); 40 (United States) Phil Coke (DET); 63 (Australia) Rich Thompson (LAA); 58 (United States) Ross Detwiler (WSH); 22 (United States) Trevor Bell (LAA); 43 (Venezuela) José Veras (PIT); 21 (United States) Bill Bray (CIN); 32 (United States) LaTroy Hawkins (MIL); 52 (Dominican Republic) Ramón Ramírez (SF); 61 (United States) Mark Melancon (HOU); 40 (United States) Collin Balester (WSH)	Catchers: 9 (Dominican Republic) Ronny Paulino (NYM); 14 (United States) Jeff Mathis (LAA); 41 (United States) Drew Butera (MIN); Infielders: 24 (Dominican Republic) Robinson Canó (NYY); 38 (United States) Michael Morse (WSH); 48 (Venezuela) Pablo Sandoval (SF); 2 (Dominican Republic) Erick Aybar (LAA); 1 (United States) Ryan Roberts (ARI); 35 (United States) Danny Valencia (MIN); 21 (United States) Ty Wigginton (COL); Outfielders: 13 (United States) Curtis Granderson (NYY); 1 (Dominican Republic) Emilio Bonifacio (FLM); 5 (United States) Logan Morrison (FLM); 56 (United States) Andrés Torres (SF); 16 (United States) Josh Reddick (BOS)	Manager: 15 (United States) Bruce Bochy (SF); Coaches: 40 (United States) Rick Honeycutt (LAD); 17 (United States) Derek Shelton (TB); 23 (United States) Ron Wotus (SF); 58 (United States) Bill Hayes (SF); -- (Dominican Republic) Joselito Canó

Chinese Taipei roster
Active roster		Coaches/Other
Pitchers: 12 (Taiwan) Chien-Ming Wang (WSH); 36 (Taiwan) Fu-Te Ni; 16 (Taiwan) Yang Yao-hsun; 17 (Taiwan) Lin Yi-hao; 19 (Taiwan) Cheng Kai-wen; 21 (Taiwan) Lo Ching-lung; 37 (Taiwan) Yu-Ching Lin; 69 (Taiwan) Wang Yao-lin; 75 (Taiwan) Kuo Chun-lin; 45 (Taiwan) Po-Yu Lin	Catchers: 28 (Taiwan) Chun-Hsiu Chen; 14 (Taiwan) Wang Chun-Chieh; 29 (Taiwan) Yang Kuan-Wei; Infielders: 20 (Taiwan) Huang Chih-Pei; 34 (Taiwan) Lin Han; 98 (Taiwan) Chih-Fang Pan; 30 (Taiwan) Pin-Chieh Chen; 78 (Taiwan) Fu-Lin Kuo; 30 (Taiwan) Lin Wei-Ting; Outfielders: 10 (Taiwan) Che-hsuan Lin; 55 (Taiwan) Kuo-Hui Kao; 24 (Taiwan) Wang-Wei Lin; 88 (Taiwan) Lan Yin-Lun	Manager: 53 (Taiwan) Chen Wei-chen; Coaches: 76 (Taiwan) Lin Ming-hsien; 75 (Taiwan) Ching-He Chuang; 81 (Taiwan) Cheng Po-jen; 34 (Taiwan) Lin Cheng-feng; 22 (Taiwan) Liu Chia-Hao; 92 (Taiwan) Liu Yu-Chen

== Controversy ==
Due to scheduling conflicts and unable to agree on the terms with the event organiser, CPBL players were not allowed to participate in the series.

== Future ==
In 2011, Jim Small commented on possible return of the series in future. However, this has not been materialized.

In April 2017, during negotiation with CPBL, Jim Small proposed to send an all star team to South Korea and then to play 3 games in Taiwan next November. In June 2017, during a visit to Taoyuan, Small further confirmed the selection of hosting city. Mayor of Taoyuan Cheng Wen-tsan promised to search for a suitable venue such as Taoyuan International Baseball Stadium. However, the series did not come to fruition.

In 2019, after promotion to senior vice president of MLB’s international business, Jim Small reiterated the interest of hosting MLB Opening Series in Taiwan. He stressed on two important factors in consideration, adverse weather causing delays or cancelled games just like Dodgers game in 2010 and 2011 series and huge costs of hosting games in Asia. Therefore Small expressed hope for the completion of Taipei Dome with over 40,000 capacity as the first covered baseball stadium in Taiwan to enhance the possibility.

== See also ==
- List of Major League Baseball games played outside the United States and Canada
- List of sporting events in Taiwan
