= Lee Tae-yang (baseball, born 1990) =

South Korean baseball player

Kia Tigers – No. 44
- Pitcher
- Born: July 3, 1990 (age 36)
- Bats: Left Throws: Right

KBO debut
- 2012, for the Hanwha Eagles

KBO statistics (through 2025)
- Win–loss record: 38–55
- Earned run average: 4.96
- Strikeouts: 624
- Stats at Baseball Reference

Teams
- Hanwha Eagles (2012–2014, 2016–2020); SK Wyverns / SSG Landers (2020–2022); Hanwha Eagles (2023–2025)

- Lee Tae-yang
- Hangul: 이태양
- Hanja: 李太陽
- RR: I Taeyang
- MR: I T'aeyang

Lee Tae-yang (Korean: 이태양; born July 3, 1990, in Yeosu, South Jeolla) is a South Korean right-handed pitcher who plays for the Kia Tigers of the KBO League.

Lee won a gold medal with the South Korea national baseball team at the 2014 Asian Games.

On June 18, 2020, he moved through a 1:1 trade with Roh Soo-kwang, then a member of the SK Wyverns.

On November 19, 2025, he was transferred to the Kia Tigers through the 2026 KBO League second draft.
