= Ryota Ishioka =

Japanese baseball player (born 1992)

Ryota Ishioka 石岡 諒太
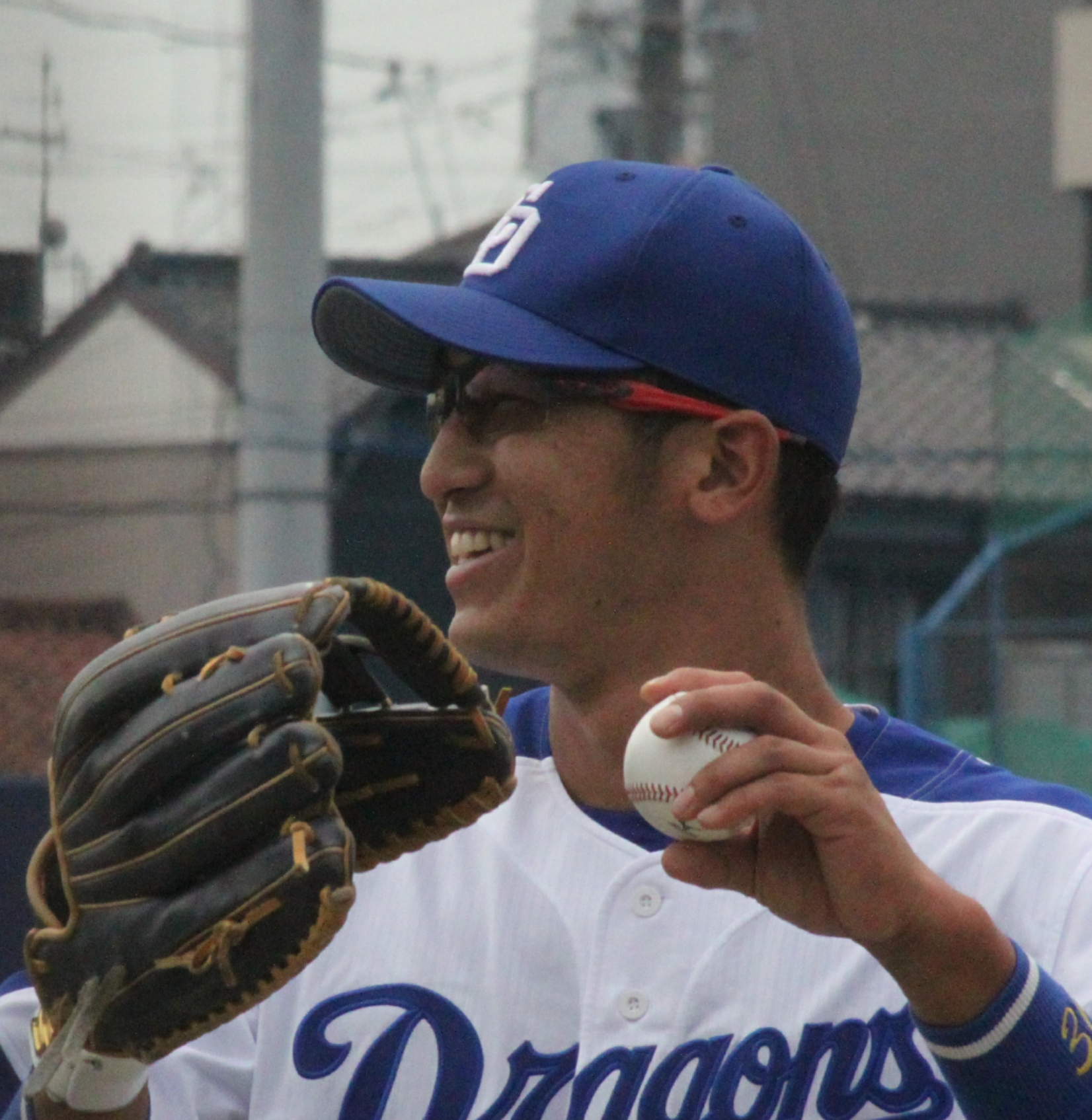
- Infielder
- Born: May 25, 1992 (age 34); Kita-ku, Kobe, Hyōgo, Japan
- Batted: Left Threw: Left

NPB debut
- 8 July, 2017, for the Chunichi Dragons

Last NPB appearance
- September 1, 2022, for the Orix Buffaloes

NPB statistics (through 2022)
- Batting average: .205
- Hits: 15
- Home runs: 0
- RBIs: 1
- Stats at Baseball Reference

Teams
- Chunichi Dragons (2015–2022); Orix Buffaloes (2022–2023)

Ryota Ishioka (石岡 諒太, Ishioka Ryōta; born May 25, 1992 in Kita-ku, Kobe, Hyogo, Japan) is a Japanese former professional baseball infielder.

== Early career ==
Ishioka started playing rubber-ball baseball in elementary school and while at junior high school played for the Kobe Sky Dragons.

He played for St Michael's Senior High School and in Autumn of his junior year nailed down his spot as starting first baseman. In his senior year, his school played in the Spring senbatsu tournament where Ishioka struck out twice in the first and only game leading to the team's exit. After graduation, he went to play for JR East.

Ishioka contributed to JR East's victory in the 82nd Intercity baseball tournament, picking up rookie player of the tournament honours. In his second year as third batter in the line-up, he helped the team to become runners-up and in 2014 he was selected to represent Japan at the 17th Asian Games where he along with future team-mates Issei Endō, Masataka Iryo and Shun Ishikawa claimed the bronze medal.

On 22 October 2016, at the 2015 Nippon Professional Baseball draft, Ishioka was the 6th pick for the Chunichi Dragons. On 25 November, he signed a contract worth ¥5,000,000 per year with a \10,000,000 sign on bonus.

On July 8, 2022, Ishioka was traded to the Orix Buffaloes for outfielder Shunta Gotoh.

== Professional career ==
In the lead up to Spring training he complained of lower back soreness and on 28 January Ishioka underwent surgery for an intervertebral disk hernia.

Ishioka was the only rookie of the 2015 draft class not to make an appearance during the 2016 season. He did however perform well in the Western League farm team registering a .289/.355/.329 slash line.

He was selected alongside team-mates Takuma Kato, Shota Suzuki, Ryosuke Nomura, Hayato Mizowaki and Hiroki Kondoh to represent the Western League selection at the 2016 Asian Winter League held in Taiwan.

After struggling with a hernial disc injury, Ishioka was demoted to a development contract for the 2020 season.
