= Ishioka (surname) =

Ishioka (written: 石岡) is a Japanese surname. Notable people with the surname include:

- Chiaki Ishioka (石岡 千秋, born 1961), Japanese alpine skier
- Eiko Ishioka (石岡 瑛子, 1938–2012), Japanese art director, costume designer and graphic designer
- Masato Ishioka (石岡 正人, born 1960), Japanese film director and screenwriter
- Ryota Ishioka (石岡 諒太, born 1992), Japanese baseball player
- Saori Ishioka (石岡 沙織, born 1987), Japanese mixed martial artist, kickboxer and karateka
- Takuya Ishioka (石岡 拓也, born 1971), Japanese alpine skier
