= Hyun-hee =

- Hangul: 현희
- RR: Hyeonhui
- MR: Hyŏnhŭi

Hyun-hee, also spelled Hyun-hui, Hyon-hui or Hyon-hi, is a Korean given name.

People with this name include:

- Kim Hyon-hui (born 1962), North Korean agent
- Na Hyun-hee (born 1970), South Korean actress
- Kim Hyon-hui (table tennis) (born 1979), North Korean table tennis player
- Nam Hyun-hee (born 1981), South Korean foil fencer
- Hong Hyun-hee (born 1982), South Korean basketball player
- Joo Hyun-hee (born 1982), South Korean badminton player
- Hong Hyun-hui (born 1991), South Korean tennis player
- Yun Hyon-hi (born 1992), North Korean football forward
- Han Hyun-hee (born 1993), South Korean baseball pitcher

== See also ==
- List of Korean given names
