= Lo Kuo-hua =

Taiwanese baseball player (born 1992)

- Pitcher
- Born: 28 October 1992 (age 34); Chiayi City, Taiwan
- Bats: Right Throws: Right

CPBL debut
- July 14, 2017, for the Fubon Guardians

CPBL statistics (through 2023 season)
- Win–loss record: 6–7
- Earned run average: 6.21
- Strikeouts: 64
- Stats at Baseball Reference

Teams
- Fubon Guardians (2017–2021); Wei Chuan Dragons (2022–2023)

Lo Kuo-hua (born 28 October 1992) is a Taiwanese former professional baseball pitcher. He played in the Chinese Professional Baseball League (CPBL) for the Fubon Guardians and Wei Chuan Dragons.

== Career ==
=== Minnesota Twins ===
On June 10, 2011, Lo signed with the Minnesota Twins as an international free agent. He began his career in 2012 with the rookie-level Gulf Coast League Twins, pitching to a 2–0 record with a 1.13 ERA in 6 starts. He spent the 2013, 2014, and 2015 with the Rookie-level Elizabethton Twins, pitching to a cumulative 9–2 record with 9 saves in 53 appearances.

In 2015, he had a 1.44 ERA with 43 strikeouts in 31 1/3 innings pitched. Lo was assigned to the Single-A Cedar Rapids Kernels for the 2016 season. On August 4, 2016, Lo was released.

=== Lincoln Saltdogs ===
On August 7, 2016, Lo signed with the Lincoln Saltdogs of the American Association of Independent Professional Baseball. Lo allowed 2 runs in 3 innings pitched for the Saltdogs over 3 appearances. He was released on October 19.

=== Fubon Guardians ===
Lo signed with the Fubon Guardians of the Chinese Professional Baseball League for the 2017 season. In 75 appearances for Fubon through the 2020 season, Lo pitched to a 6.22 ERA with 60 strikeouts in 72 1/3 innings pitched.

=== Wei Chuan Dragons ===
In 2023, Lo made 4 appearances for the Wei Chuan Dragons, struggling immensely to a 20.25 ERA with no strikeouts in 1 1/3 innings of work. On November 30, 2023, Lo was non-tendered by Wei Chuan.

== International career ==
Lo represented Taiwan at the 2010 World Junior Baseball Championship, 2014 Asian Games, 2015 Asian Baseball Championship, 2015 WBSC Premier12, and 2017 World Baseball Classic.
