= Kim Min-sung (baseball) =

South Korean baseball former player (born 1988)

Lotte Giants – No. 16
- Third baseman / Coach
- Born: December 17, 1988 (age 37); Seoul, South Korea
- Bats: Right Throws: Right

KBO debut
- 2007, for the Lotte Giants

KBO statistics (through June 2, 2024)
- Batting average: .268
- Home runs: 133
- Runs batted in: 733
- Stats at Baseball Reference

Teams
- As player: Lotte Giants (2007–2010); Nexen Heroes (2010–2018); LG Twins (2019–2023); Lotte Giants (2024–2026); As coach: Lotte Giants (2027–present)

- Kim Min-sung
- Hangul: 김민성
- Hanja: 金旼成
- RR: Gim Minseong
- MR: Kim Minsŏng

Kim Min-sung (born December 17, 1988) is a South Korean professional baseball infielder for the Lotte Giants of the KBO League.
