= Kuo Yen-wen =

Taiwanese baseball player (born 1988)

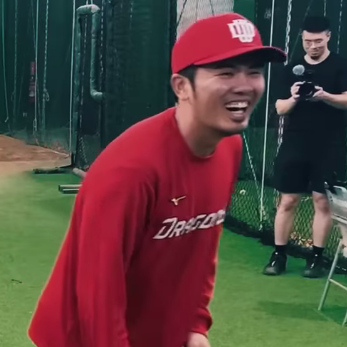
- Kuo Yen-wen with the Wei Chuan Dragons in 2025

CTBC Brothers – No. 119
- Infielder
- Born: October 25, 1988 (age 37); Tainan, Taiwan
- Bats: Left Throws: Right

CPBL debut
- April 2, 2011, for the Lamigo Monkeys

CPBL statistics (through 2025)
- Batting average: .299
- Hits: 1,296
- Home runs: 98
- Runs batted in: 672
- Stats at Baseball Reference

Teams
- Lamigo Monkeys / Rakuten Monkeys (2011–2023); Wei Chuan Dragons (2024–2025); CTBC Brothers (2026–)

Career highlights and awards
- 6x Taiwan Series champion (2012, 2014–2015, 2017–2019)
Medals
Representing Chinese Taipei
Baseball
Asian Games
Silver medal – second place	2010 Guangzhou	Baseball
Silver medal – second place	2014 Incheon	Baseball

Kuo Yen-wen (Chinese: 郭嚴文; pinyin: Guō Yánwén; born October 25, 1988) is a Taiwanese professional baseball infielder for the CTBC Brothers of the Chinese Professional Baseball League (CPBL). He has previously played in the CPBL for the Lamigo Monkeys/Rakuten Monkeys and the Wei Chuan Dragons.

== Career ==
Kuo and represented Taiwan at the 2006 World Junior Baseball Championship, 2008 Olympics, 2009 World Baseball Classic, 2013 World Baseball Classic, and 2014 Asian Games.

=== Cincinnati Reds ===
Kuo signed with the Cincinnati Reds as an international free agent in 2008. Kuo played for the Dayton Dragons and Billings Mustangs before being released on March 29, 2010.

=== Lamigo Monkeys/Rakuten Monkeys ===
Kuo signed with the Lamigo Monkeys of the Chinese Professional Baseball League in 2011 and has played for the club through the 2020 season.

In 37 games for Rakuten in 2023, Kuo batted .307/.326/.402 with 2 home runs and 13 RBI. On November 30, 2023, Kuo was non-tendered by the Monkeys.

=== Wei Chuan Dragons ===
On January 11, 2024, Kuo signed a two-year contract with the Wei Chuan Dragons.

=== CTBC Brothers ===
On April 2, 2026, Kuo signed with the CTBC Brothers.
