= Kuo Chun-lin =

Taiwanese baseball player (born 1992)

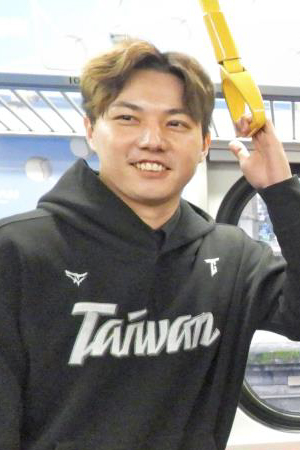
- Kuo pitching for the Chinese Taipei national team in 2015 WBSC Premier12 warm-up game

Uni-President Lions – No. 75
- Pitcher
- Born: February 2, 1992 (age 34); Hsinchu, Taiwan
- Bats: Right Throws: Right

Professional debut
- NPB: March 29, 2015, for the Saitama Seibu Lions
- CPBL: November 9, 2021, for the Fubon Guardians

NPB statistics (through 2019 season)
- Win–loss record: 5−11
- Earned run average: 5.92
- Strikeouts: 86

CPBL statistics (through 2025 season)
- Win–loss record: 8−26
- Earned run average: 5.48
- Strikeouts: 170
- Stats at Baseball Reference

Teams
- Saitama Seibu Lions (2015–2019); Fubon Guardians (2021–2023); Uni-President Lions (2024–present)
Medals
Representing Chinese Taipei
Men's baseball
Asian Games
Silver medal – second place	2014 Incheon	Team
WBSC Premier12
Gold medal – first place	2024	Team

Kuo Chun-lin (Chinese: 郭俊麟; pinyin: Guō Jùnlín; Japanese romaji:Kaku Shunrin; born February 2, 1992) is a Taiwanese professional baseball pitcher for the Uni-President Lions of the Chinese Professional Baseball League (CPBL). He has previously played in Nippon Professional Baseball (NPB) for the Saitama Seibu Lions and in the CPBL for the Fubon Guardians. He attended the National Taiwan University of Physical Education and Sport.

== Career ==
=== Saitama Seibu Lions ===
Kuo signed with the Lions after pitching for the Chinese Taipei national baseball team at the 2014 Asian Games, where he earned a silver medal. In November, Kuo won the final of the inaugural World Baseball Softball Confederation 21U Baseball World Cup by pitching a 9–0 shutout versus Japan. Kuo made his NPB debut against the Orix Buffaloes on March 29, 2015, pitching five innings, giving up three runs and recording the win. He finished the season with a 3–7 record and 5.31 ERA over 21 games, and resigned with the Lions on November 18, 2015, for a one-year contract worth at least ¥30 million. Kuo was named to the Chinese Taipei national baseball team for the 2017 World Baseball Classic. He returned to the Lions in the 2018 season.

On December 2, 2019, Kuo became a free agent.

=== Fubon Guardians ===
On September 19, 2020, Kuo signed with the Fubon Guardians of the Chinese Professional Baseball League (CPBL). At the time of his signing, Kuo was still recovering from Tommy John surgery. He made his CPBL debut on November 9, 2021.

=== Uni-President Lions ===
On November 28, 2023, Kuo was drafted by the TSG Hawks in the team's expansion draft. However, on December 27, the Hawks traded Kuo to the Uni-President Lions in exchange for Chen-yen Chiang.
