= Shao-Ching Chiang =

Taiwanese baseball player (born 1993)

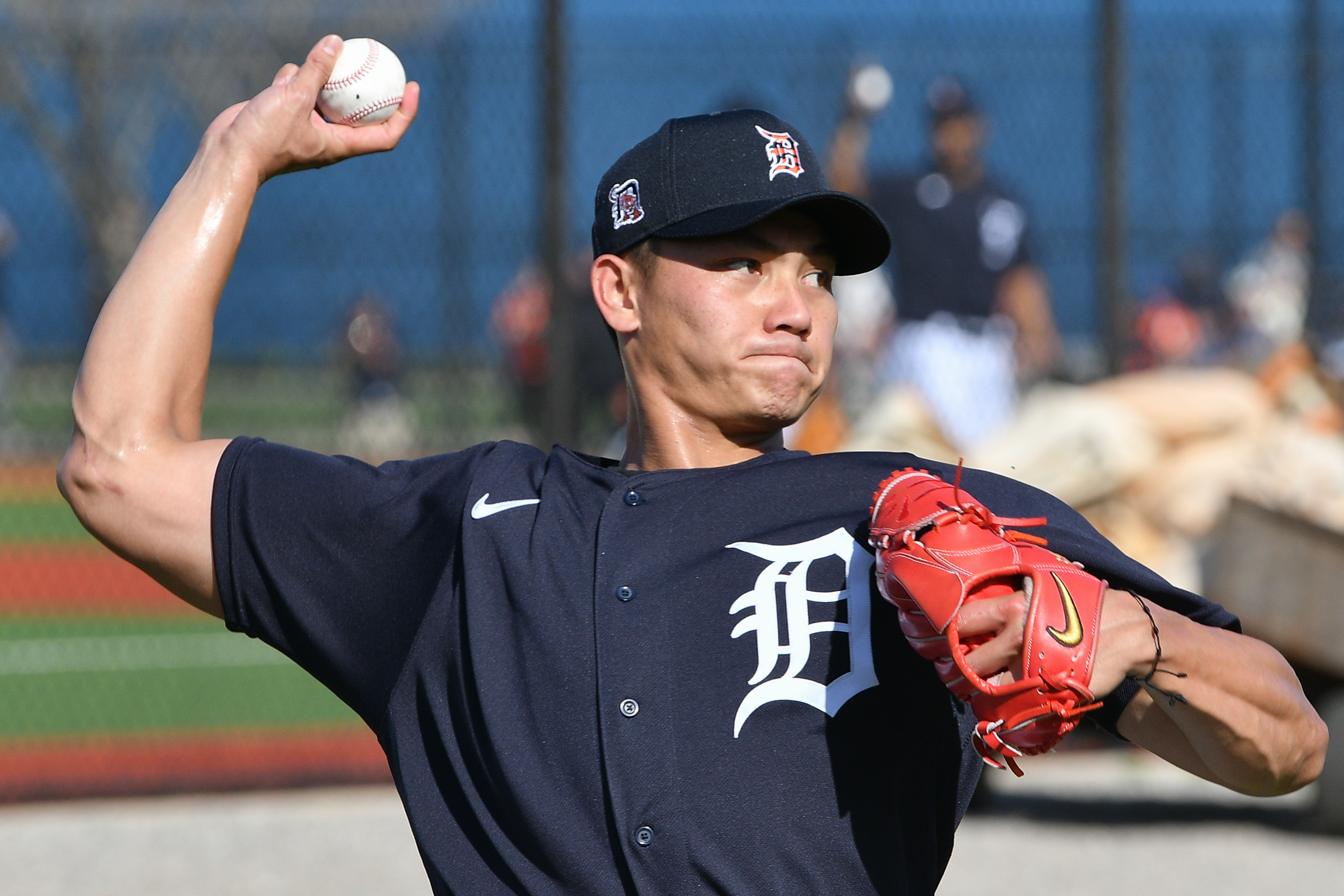
- Chiang with the Detroit Tigers in 2020 Spring Training

Uni-President Lions – No. 76
- Pitcher
- Born: November 10, 1993 (age 33); Hualien County, Taiwan
- Bats: Right Throws: Right

CPBL debut
- August 25, 2021, for the Fubon Guardians

CPBL statistics (through 2024 season)
- Win–loss record: 13–22
- Earned run average: 3.68
- Strikeouts: 220
- Stats at Baseball Reference

Teams
- Fubon Guardians (2021–2025); Uni-President Lions (2026–present)
Medals
Men's baseball
Representing Chinese Taipei
Asian Games
Silver medal – second place	2014 Incheon	National team

Shao-Ching Chiang (Chinese: 江少慶; pinyin: Jiāng Shǎoqìng; born November 10, 1993) is a Taiwanese professional baseball pitcher for the Fubon Guardians of the Chinese Professional Baseball League (CPBL). He has represented the Taiwanese national team in international competitions.

== Early life ==
Chiang started playing baseball in the fifth grade. He graduated from elementary and junior high school in Hualien before moving to Taipei for high school.

== Career ==
=== Cleveland Indians ===
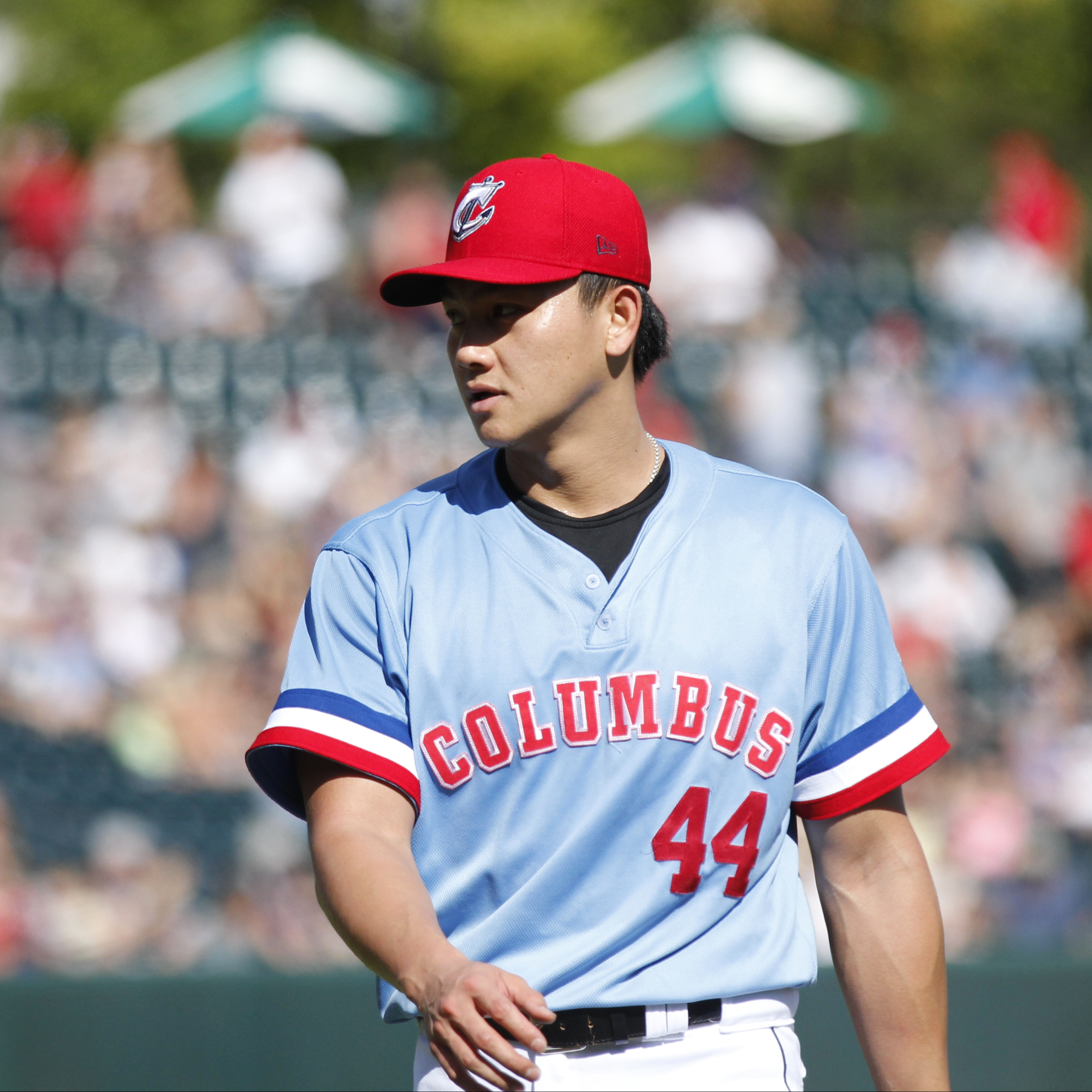
Chiang with the Columbus Clippers in 2018

Chiang signed as an international free agent with the Cleveland Indians organization. From 2012 through 2014, Chiang played for the Arizona League Indians, making just one appearance in each of his first two years. In 2014, he pitched in ten games (eight starts) and compiled a 4–2 win–loss record and a 4.53 earned run average (ERA). He spent 2015 with the Mahoning Valley Scrappers where he pitched to a 3–2 record and 3.92 ERA in nine games (eight starts), and 2016 with the Lake County Captains where he posted an 8–12 record and 3.96 ERA in 27 starts.

Chiang spent 2017 with the Lynchburg Hillcats and Akron RubberDucks where he pitched to a combined 9–10 record and 4.29 ERA in 25 total starts between both teams. In 2018, he split the season between Akron and the Columbus Clippers, going a combined 9–7 with a 3.90 with 135 1/3 innings pitched.

Chiang opened the 2019 season back with Columbus. In 26 starts, he logged a 9–9 record and 5.15 ERA with 128 strikeouts across 131 innings pitched. Chiang elected free agency following the season on November 4, 2019.

=== Detroit Tigers ===
On December 18, 2019, Chiang signed a minor league contract with the Detroit Tigers. Chiang did not play in a game in 2020 due to the cancellation of the minor league season because of the COVID-19 pandemic. He became a free agent on November 2, 2020.

=== Fubon Guardians ===
On February 25, 2021, Chiang agreed to a development contract with the Fubon Guardians of the Chinese Professional Baseball League (CPBL) in Taiwan. The team subsequently selected him first overall in the 2021 CPBL draft.

== International career ==
Chiang represented Taiwan (Chinese Taipei) at the 2014 Asian Games and 2017 World Baseball Classic. In the 2014 Asian Games in South Korea, winning a silver medal with Taiwan. In the 2017 World Baseball Classic, he pitched 4 1/3 innings in one appearance against the Netherlands.

Chiang again represented Taiwan in the 2019 WBSC Premier12 as a starting pitcher against Puerto Rico in the Opening Round, and against Mexico in the Super Round. In total, he pitched 11.2 innings with 13 strikeouts and ERA 2.31. His strong performance later attracted many MLB and NPB inquiries. He ultimately ended up in the Detroit Tigers minor league system.
