= Chih-Wei Hu =

Taiwanese baseball player (born 1993)

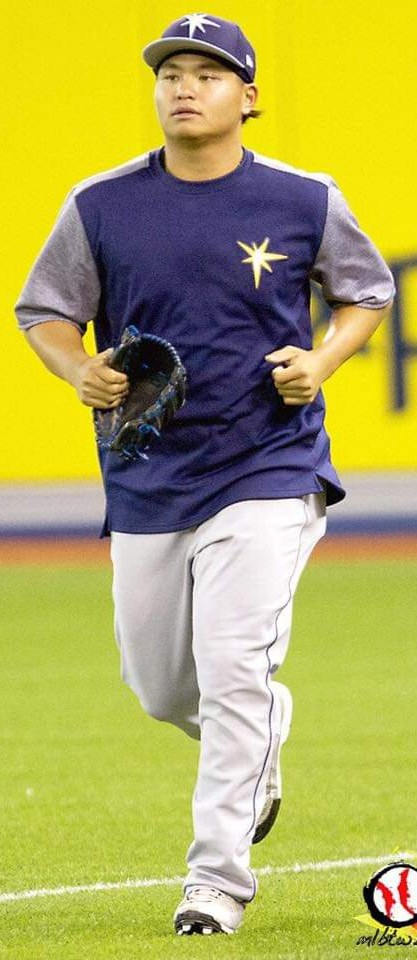
- Chih-Wei Hu with the Tampa Bay Rays

Uni-President Lions – No. 58
- Pitcher
- Born: November 4, 1993 (age 33); Taichung, Taiwan
- Bats: Right Throws: Right

Professional debut
- MLB: April 24, 2017, for the Tampa Bay Rays
- CPBL: August 29, 2021, for the Uni-President Lions

MLB statistics (through 2018 season)
- Win–loss record: 1–1
- Earned run average: 3.52
- Strikeouts: 21

CPBL statistics (through 2025 season)
- Win–loss record: 21–35
- Earned run average: 4.10
- Strikeouts: 247
- Saves: 2
- Stats at Baseball Reference

Teams
- Tampa Bay Rays (2017–2018); Uni-President Lions (2021–present)
Medals
Representing Chinese Taipei
Men's baseball
Asian Games
| Silver medal – second place | 2014 Incheon | Team |

Chih-Wei Hu (Chinese: 胡智爲; born November 4, 1993) is a Taiwanese professional baseball pitcher for the Uni-President Lions of the Chinese Professional Baseball League (CPBL). He has previously played in Major League Baseball (MLB) for the Tampa Bay Rays.

== Career ==
=== Minnesota Twins ===
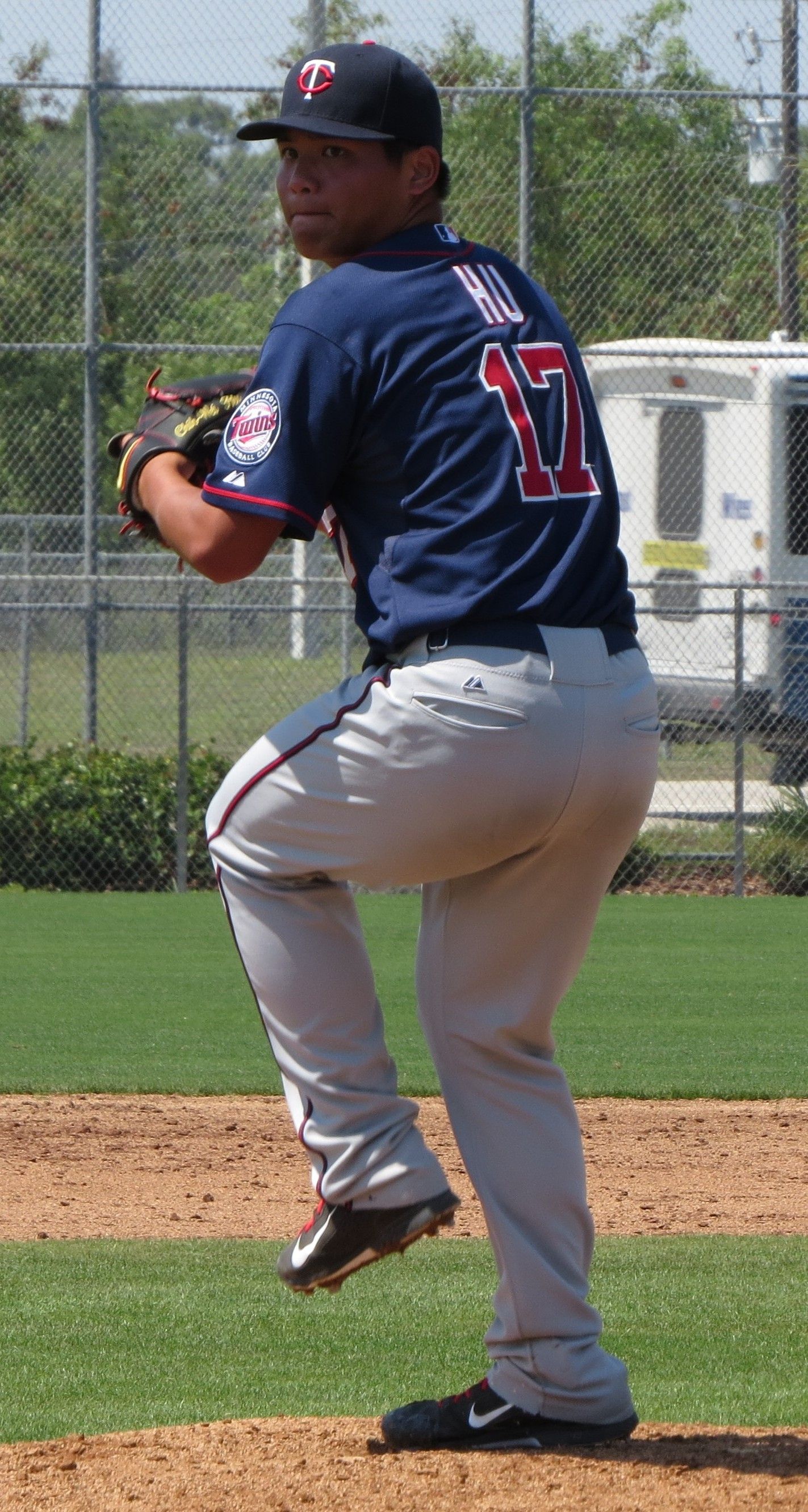
Hu pitching for the Minnesota Twins in 2015

Hu was signed by the Minnesota Twins organization as an international free agent on August 3, 2012. He made his professional debut in 2013 with the Gulf Coast Twins, posting a 2.45 ERA in 12 appearances. In 2014, he pitched with the rookie-level Elizabethton Twins and Single-A Cedar Rapids Kernels, logging a cumulative 8–2 record and 2.15 ERA in 13 games, 12 of them starts. Hu began the 2015 season with the High-A Fort Myers Miracle, and also pitched in 1 game for the Triple-A Rochester Red Wings.

=== Tampa Bay Rays ===
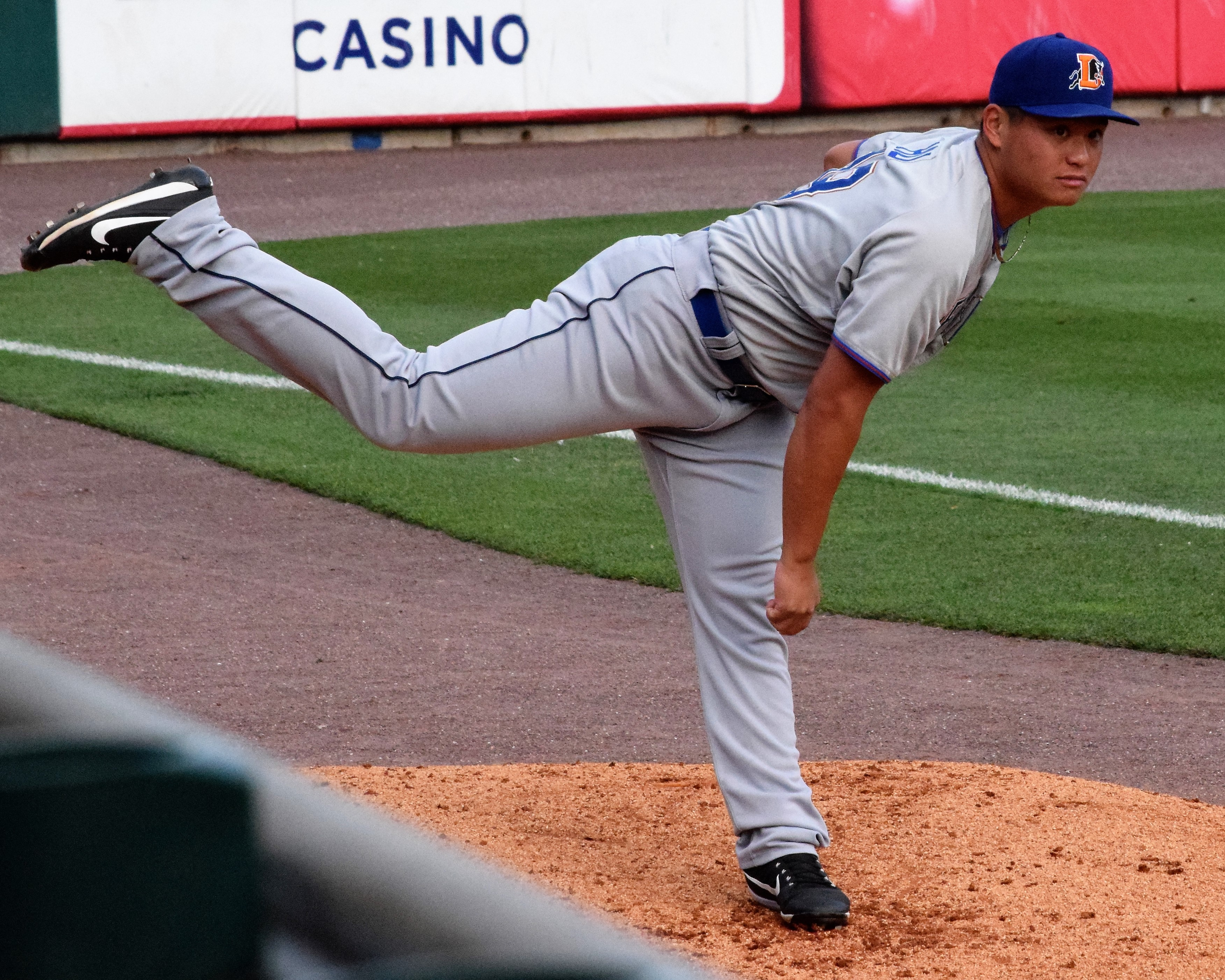
Hu pitching for the Durham Bulls in 2017

On July 31, 2015, the Twins traded Hu and Alexis Tapia to the Tampa Bay Rays for pitcher Kevin Jepsen. Hu finished the year with the High-A Charlotte Stone Crabs, struggling with an 0–3 record and 7.36 ERA in 5 games. In 2016, Hu split the season between the Double-A Montgomery Biscuits and the Triple-A Durham Bulls, recording a 7–9 record and 2.75 ERA with 114 strikeouts in 147 1/3 innings of work. Hu was named to the roster of the World team for the 2016 All-Star Futures Game. On November 18, 2016, the Rays added Hu to their 40-man roster to protect him from the Rule 5 draft.

Hu began the 2017 season with Durham before being promoted to the major leagues for the first time on April 23. He made his MLB debut the following day, pitching a scoreless innings of relief against the Baltimore Orioles. Hu finished his first MLB season with a 1–1 record and 2.70 ERA with 9 strikeouts in 10 innings of work across 6 appearances. In 2018, Hu spent the majority of the year in Durham but recorded a 4.15 ERA in 5 appearances with the Rays.

=== Cleveland Indians ===
On November 19, 2018, Hu was traded to the Cleveland Indians in exchange for minor league infielder Gionti Turner. Hu was assigned to the Triple-A Columbus Clippers to begin the 2019 season. On July 3, 2019, he was designated for assignment by the Indians without having appeared in a game for the team. He was subsequently sent outright to Columbus and later demoted to the Double-A Akron RubberDucks before being released by the Indians on July 30.

=== Chicago Cubs ===
On August 8, 2019, Hu signed a minor league contract with the Chicago Cubs. He finished the year in Chicago's minor league system, posting a 2–2 record between the Triple–A Iowa Cubs and the Double–A Tennessee Smokies. Hu elected free agency following the season on November 4.

=== San Diego Padres ===
On December 19, 2019, Hu signed a minor league contract with the San Diego Padres organization. Hu did not play in a game in 2020 due to the cancellation of the minor league season because of the COVID-19 pandemic. On November 2, 2020, he elected free agency.

In June 2021, an unnamed team in Nippon Professional Baseball (NPB) made an offer to sign Hu, but the amount was not enough to convince Hu to go overseas and he did not sign with the team.

=== Uni-President Lions ===
On July 1, 2021, Hu announced that he would enter the mid-season draft in the Chinese Professional Baseball League (CPBL). He was selected fourth overall by the Uni-President Lions. He made 12 appearances down the stretch, logging a 4–4 record and 4.74 ERA.

In 2022, Hu made 27 appearances (26 starts) for the Lions, registering a 9–13 record and 3.35 ERA with 84 strikeouts across 150 2/3 innings of work. The following season, he started 15 games (out of 18 appearances) for the club, and posted a 4–8 record and 4.70 ERA with 42 strikeouts across 84 1/3 innings pitched.

On February 14, 2024, it was announced that Hu would miss the first half of the season after undergoing surgery to remove bone spurs from his elbow. He returned to pitch in 8 games in 2024, with a 2–3 record and 5.00 ERA.

== International career ==
He played for Taiwan at the 2014 Asian Games at the 2014 Asian Games. He also played for his national team in the 2009 World Baseball Classic and 2023 World Baseball Classic.

== See also ==
- List of Major League Baseball players from Taiwan
