= Li Xin (baseball) =

Chinese baseball player

Tianjin Lions
- Pitcher
- Born: April 17, 1992 (age 34); Tianjin, China
- Bats: Left Throws: Left

Li Xin (born April 17, 1992) is a Chinese baseball pitcher who plays with the Tianjin Lions in the China Baseball League.

Li represented China at the 2012 Asia Series, 2012 Asian Baseball Championship, 2013 East Asian Games, 2013 World Baseball Classic, 2014 Asian Games, 2015 Asian Baseball Championship, and 2017 World Baseball Classic.
