= Lin Han =

Taiwanese baseball player

Taiwan Cooperative Bank baseball team
- Infielder
- Born: 24 January 1985 (age 41); Taiwan
- Bats: Right Throws: Right
- Stats at Baseball Reference

Teams
- Taiwan Cooperative Bank baseball team (2009–present)

Lin Han
Medal record

Representing Chinese Taipei

Baseball

Asian Games
Silver medal – second place	2014 Incheon	Baseball

Lin Han (Chinese: 林瀚; born 24 January 1985) is a Taiwanese baseball player who plays for the Taiwan Cooperative Bank baseball team. He is a cousin of former Taiwan national team pitcher Cheng-Hsun Hsieh.

Lin played for Taiwan in the 2001 World Youth Baseball Championship and 2006 World University Baseball Championship. In the 2006 Haarlem Baseball Week, he went 1 for 11 in his first action with a senior Taiwan national team. During the 2007 World Port Tournament, he hit .206/.289/.235 and made four errors in nine games.

Lin was drafted by the Chinatrust Whales in 2007. When the Whales were disbanded following a 2008 gambling scandal, he went to the Uni-President Lions in the 2nd round of the disbursement draft. As he was completing his military service, he had not played yet for the Whales.

Lin was on Taiwan's roster for the 2009 World Baseball Classic. He played in their loss to China, pinch-hitting for Yen-Wen Kuo and drawing a Guoqiang Sun walk in the 7th. In the 9th, he grounded out against Chen Kun.

Lin hit .226/.294/.226 in the 2009 World Port Tournament and fielded only .870 at third base.

He also played for Taiwan in the 2013 World Baseball Classic.

Lin participated in the 2014 Asian Games, where Chinese Taipei won a silver medal, losing in the final to South Korea.
