= An Ji-man =

South Korean baseball player

Ahn Ji-man
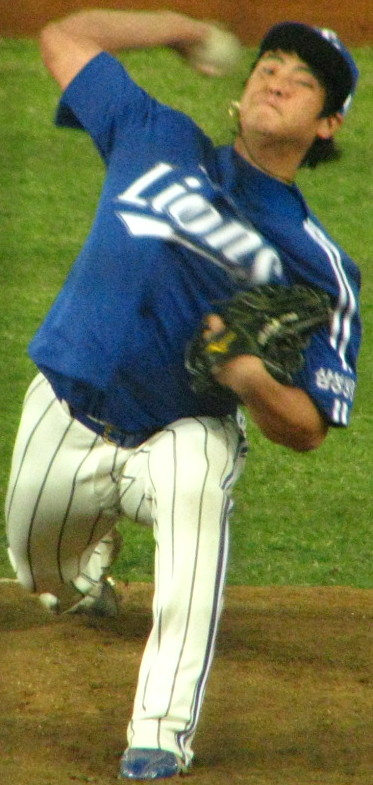
- Relief pitcher
- Born: October 1, 1983 (age 42); Daegu, South Korea
- Batted: Right Threw: Right

KBO debut
- 2003, for the Samsung Lions

Last KBO appearance
- 2016, for the Samsung Lions

KBO statistics
- Win–loss record: 60–35
- Earned run average: 3.59
- Strikeouts: 773

Teams
- Samsung Lions (2003–2016)
Medals
Representing South Korea
Men's baseball
Asian Games
Gold medal – first place	2010 Guangzhou	Team
Gold medal – first place	2014 Incheon	Team

Ahn Ji-man (Korean: 안지만; Hanja: 安志晚; born October 1, 1983) is a South Korean relief pitcher who played for the Samsung Lions of the KBO League.

== Professional career ==
Ahn was selected by the Samsung Lions in the 2nd round (5th pick, 20th overall) of the 2002 KBO Draft.

During his career, he was one of the best relief pitcher in the Korean baseball league. but because of his opening illegal sports betting website, he was released in 2016.

== Statistics ==
Year	Team	ERA	G	W	L	SV	H	IP	K	H	HR	BB	R	ER
2003	Samsung	7.89	14	1	0	0	0	21.2	11	31	6	9	19	19
2004	Samsung	7.77	12	0	0	0	0	22.0	13	30	7	12	19	19
2005	Samsung	3.48	63	8	3	0	14	82.2	72	65	8	43	35	32
2006	Samsung	9.00	7	0	1	0	2	6.0	4	10	1	6	10	6
2007	Samsung	3.42	53	5	3	0	7	108.0	83	100	7	44	43	41
2008	Samsung	2.97	51	5	1	0	9	69.2	64	67	5	30	25	23
2009	Samsung	5.12	17	2	4	0	1	51.0	32	54	5	19	31	29
2010	Samsung	2.74	67	9	3	9	8	92.0	95	74	5	32	32	28
Total		3.91	284	30	15	09	41	453.0	374	431	45	195	214	197
