= Wang Yao-lin =

Taiwanese baseball player (born 1991)

TSG Hawks – No. 95
- Pitcher
- Born: February 5, 1991 (age 35); Taitung County, Taiwan
- Bats: Right Throws: Right

CPBL debut
- September 9, 2015, for the Lamigo Monkeys

CPBL statistics (through 2025 season)
- Win–loss record: 15–22
- Earned run average: 4.77
- Strikeouts: 335
- Stats at Baseball Reference

Teams
- Lamigo Monkeys / Rakuten Monkeys (2015–2022); Fubon Guardians (2022); Wei Chuan Dragons (2023); TSG Hawks (2024–present)

Career highlights and awards
- 5x Taiwan Series champion (2015, 2017–2019, 2023）
Medals
Men's baseball
Representing Chinese Taipei
Asia Professional Baseball Championship
Bronze medal – third place	2017 Tokyo	Team
Asian Games
Silver medal – second place	2014 Incheon	Team

Wang Yao-lin (Chinese: 王躍霖; born February 5, 1991) is a Taiwanese professional baseball pitcher for the TSG Hawks of the Chinese Professional Baseball League (CPBL). He has previously played in the CPBL for the Lamigo Monkeys/Rakuten Monkeys, Fubon Guardians, and Wei Chuan Dragons. He is the older brother of Wei-Chung Wang and is a member of the Amis people.

== Career ==
=== Chicago Cubs ===
On June 15, 2010, Wang signed with the Chicago Cubs as an international free agent and was assigned to the Single-A Boise Hawks, where he posted a 6.43 ERA in 4 games (as well as a 2.12 ERA in 8 games for the rookie–level Arizona League Cubs. Wang returned to Boise in 2011, making 14 starts and posting a 4–4 record and 3.22 ERA with 77 strikeouts across 67.0 innings of work.

Wang spent the 2012 season with the Single–A Peoria Chiefs, pitching to a 4–5 record and 3.92 ERA with 82 strikeouts and 12 saves. He spent the following year with the High–A Daytona Cubs, logging a 3.42 ERA with 64 strikeouts and 4 saves across 71.0 innings pitched.

Wang played for Daytona and Boise in 2014, accumulating a 4–7 record and 5.32 ERA with 53 strikeouts in 67 2/3 innings of work. He was released by the Cubs organization on January 17, 2015.

=== Lamigo Monkeys ===
Later in the 2015, season, Wang signed with the Lamigo Monkeys of the Chinese Professional Baseball League, and played for the club through the 2020 season.

=== Fubon Guardians ===
On August 31, 2022, Wang was traded to the Fubon Guardians of the CPBL alongside Lin Tse-Pin in exchange for Yang Bin and Yang Chin-Hao.

=== TSG Hawks ===
On November 28, 2023, Wang was selected by the TSG Hawks in the team's expansion draft. However, in 2024; his first season with the Hawks, Wang failed to live up to the high expectations, recording a 6.39 ERA and blowing 4 saves while recording none across 32 appearances.

== International career ==
He represented Chinese Taipei national baseball team at the 2009 Asian Junior Baseball Championship, 2013 World Baseball Classic Qualification, 2013 World Baseball Classic, 2013 exhibition games against Japan 2014 Asian Games and 2017 Asia Professional Baseball Championship.
