= Chiang Chih-hsien =

Taiwanese baseball player (born 1988)

Chih-Hsien Chiang
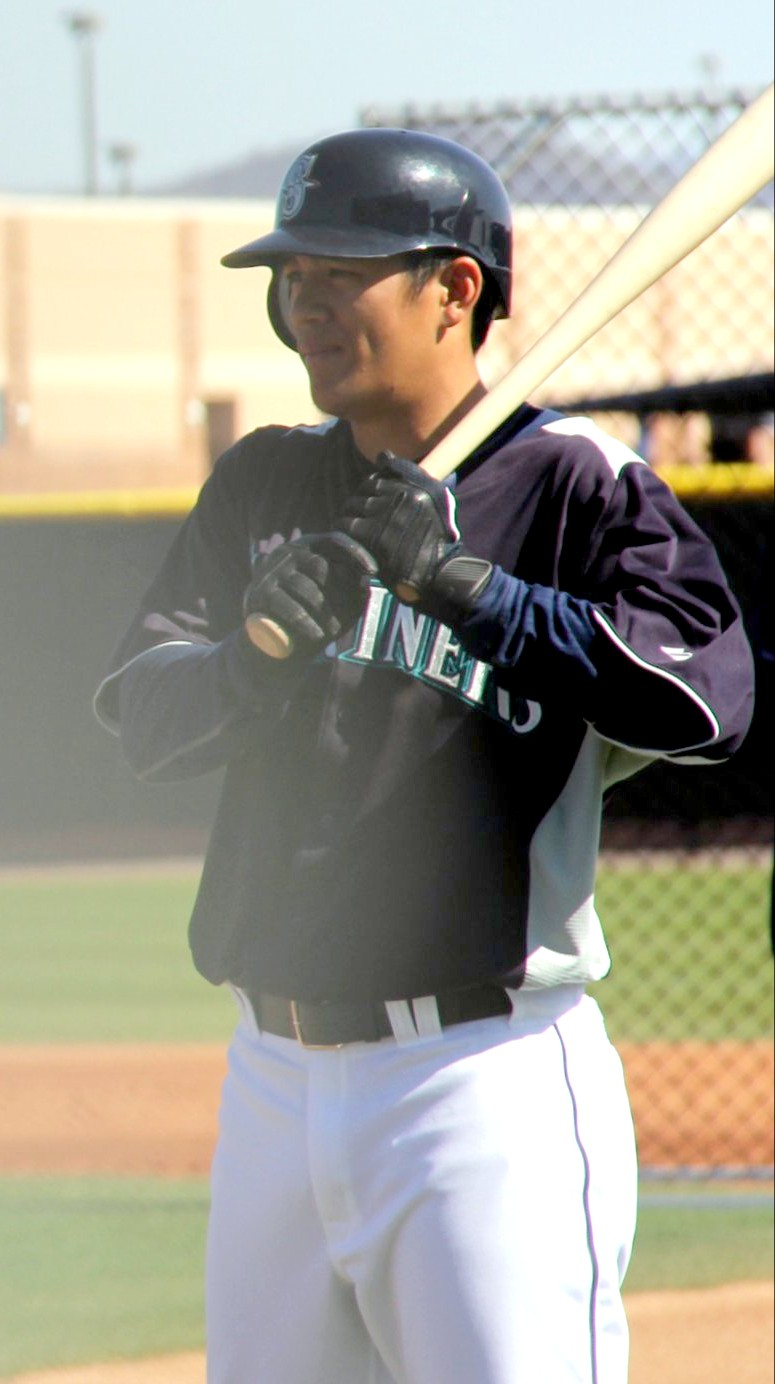
- Chiang with the Seattle Mariners in 2012
- Third baseman
- Born: 21 February 1988 (age 38); Taitung County, Taiwan
- Batted: Left Threw: Right

CPBL debut
- July 31, 2015, for the Brother Elephants

Last CPBL appearance
- October 6, 2024, for the Fubon Guardians

CPBL statistics
- Batting average: .325
- Home runs: 97
- Runs batted in: 391
- Stats at Baseball Reference

Teams
- Brother Elephants / Chinatrust Brothers (2015–2017); Fubon Guardians (2018–2024)

Chiang Chih-hsien (Chinese: 蔣智賢; pinyin: Jiǎng Zhìxián; born 21 February 1988) is a Taiwanese former professional baseball third baseman. He has previously played in the Chinese Professional Baseball League (CPBL) for the Brother Elephants/Chinatrust Brother Elephants and Fubon Guardians.

== Career ==
=== Boston Red Sox ===
Chiang signed as an infielder for the Boston Red Sox organization in 2005. He was converted to the outfield after the 2008 season. He played for the Double A Portland Sea Dogs since 2010 and has a breakthrough year in 2011. Chiang was honored as Eastern League Player of the Month for June, and was selected to participate in both the Major League Baseball Futures Game and the Eastern League All-Star Game.

=== Seattle Mariners ===
On 31 July 2011, Chiang was traded to the Seattle Mariners in a package deal for Érik Bédard. Chiang concluded his stats as a Sea Dog, hitting .340/.402/.648 with 18 homers, 37 doubles, 76 RBI, 25 walks, 61 strikeouts in 321 at-bats. He led the league in AVG, SLG, RBI, OPS, extra base hits at the time of trade. He collected back-to-back Eastern League player of the month for his monstrous July: .430/.500/.740, 16 doubles, 5 homers, 25 RBI. Chiang played 40 games for the Tacoma Rainiers before being demoted to Double A Jackson Generals. On 12 June 2012, Chiang was removed from the 40-man roster to make room for Óliver Pérez and designated for assignment. He elected free agency following the season on 2 November.

=== Texas Rangers ===
On 4 December 2012, Chiang signed a minor league contract with the Texas Rangers organization. He made 125 appearances for the Double-A Frisco RoughRiders in 2013, slashing .263/.298/.416 with 11 home runs and 52 RBI. Chiang elected free agency following the season on 4 November 2013.

=== Baltimore Orioles ===
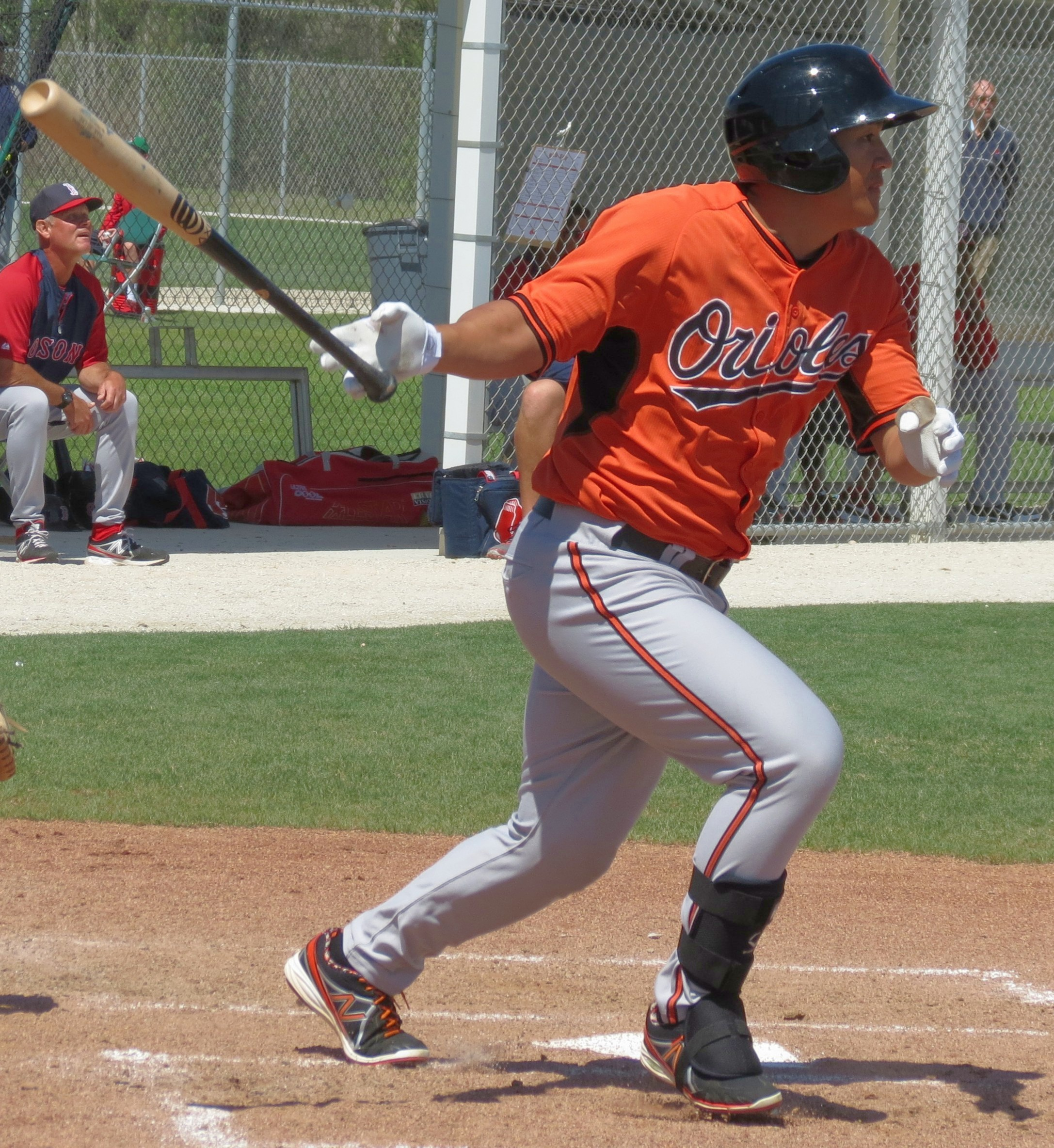
Chiang batting for the Baltimore Orioles in 2014 spring training

On 18 November 2013, Chiang signed a minor league contract with the Baltimore Orioles organization. He split the 2014 season between the Double–A Bowie Baysox and High–A Frederick Keys, playing in 90 total games and slashing .220/.278/.341 with seven home runs and 32 RBI. Chiang became a free agent after the 2014 season.

=== Chinatrust Brothers ===
On 24 July 2015, Chiang signed with the Chinatrust Brothers of the Chinese Professional Baseball League on a NT $12.42 million three–year contract. On 6 November 2017, Chiang was released by the Brothers.

=== Fubon Guardians ===
On 15 January 2018, Chiang signed a one-year contract with the Fubon Guardians. Chiang was in the Opening Day lineup for the Guardians in 2021.

== International career ==
Chiang also played for the Chinese Taipei baseball team in the 2009 World Baseball Classic, 2013 exhibition games against Japan and 2017 World Baseball Classic.
