= Han Hyun-hee =

South Korean baseball player (born 1993)

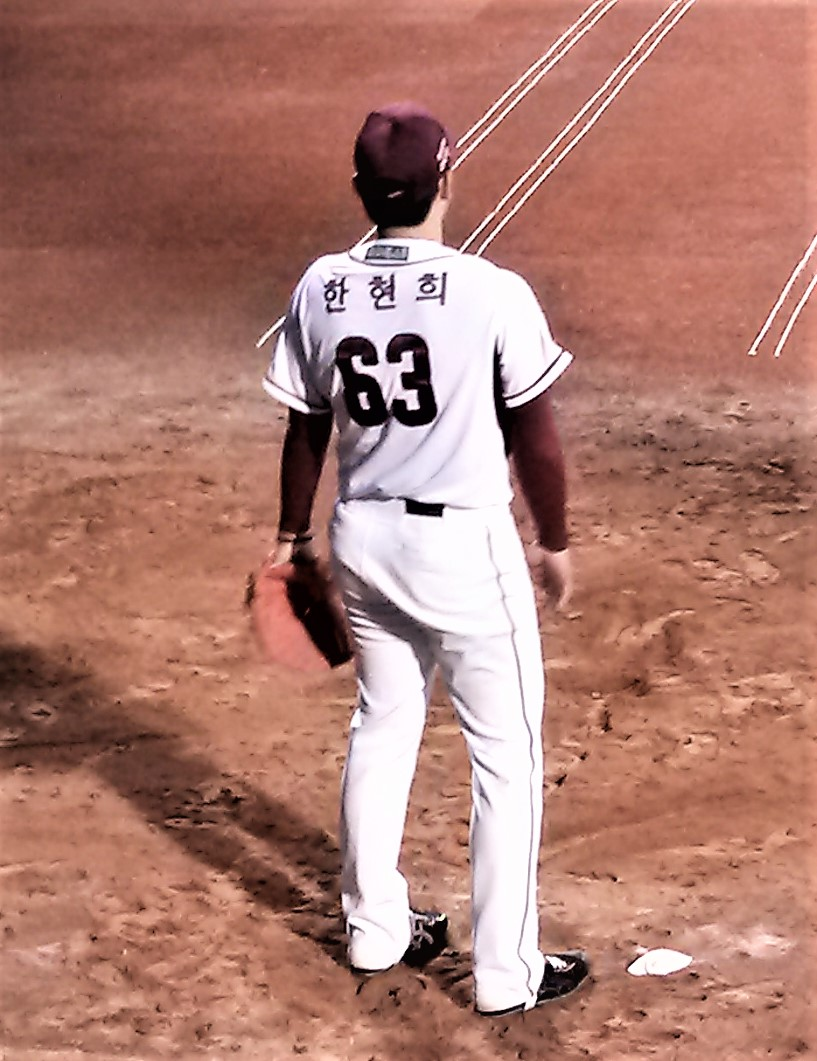

Lotte Giants – No. 1
- Pitcher
- Born: June 25, 1993 (age 33)
- Bats: Right Throws: Right

KBO debut
- April 7, 2012, for the Nexen Heroes

KBO statistics (through May 31, 2024)
- Win–loss record: 72–55
- Earned run average: 4.36
- Strikeouts: 867
- Holds: 109
- Stats at Baseball Reference

Teams
- Nexen / Kiwoom Heroes (2012–2015, 2017–2022); Lotte Giants (2023–present)

- Han Hyun-hee
- Hangul: 한현희
- Hanja: 韓賢熙
- RR: Han Hyeonhui
- MR: Han Hyŏnhŭi

Han Hyun-hee (Korean: 한현희; born June 25, 1993) is a South Korean relief pitcher who plays for the Lotte Giants of the KBO League. He bats and throws right-handed.

== Amateur career ==
Han was born in Seoul. He attended Kyungnam High School in Busan. In May 2010 Han led his team to the national championship at the 65th Blue Dragon Flag National Championship, allowing only one earned run in 10 innings pitched as the team's closer. Han threw a no-hitter on June 9, 2011, allowing two walks and striking out 17 batters with 104 pitches against Gaesung High School in the Gyeongsang regional preliminary league for the 65th Golden Lion Flag National Championship where he racked up three consecutive complete game shutout wins with 39 strikeouts in 27 innings pitched.

In August 2011 Han was selected as a member of the South Korean U-18 national team for the Asian Junior Baseball Championship held in Yokohama, Japan. Han was summoned to close the semifinal game against Chinese Taipei in the eighth inning. He earned a win, hurling three innings and allowing one unearned run in South Korea's 4–3 victory to Chinese Taipei.

On September 23, 2018, he became the first holder to win 10 games against SK.

=== Notable international appearances ===
Year	Venue	Competition	Team	Individual note
2011	Japan	Asian Junior Championship	Silver medal	1-0, 1.74 ERA (3 G, 10.1 IP, 2 ER, 11 K)

== Professional career ==
Han made himself eligible for the 2012 KBO Draft and was selected as the second overall pick in the draft by the Nexen Heroes.

In Nexen Heroes/Kiwoom Heroes, he played both the role of starting pitcher and relief pitcher, including advancing to the playoffs, and played a necessary resource for the team.

He worked hard in the 2022 season ahead of the 2023 season FA, but his disappointing performance showed disappointing results such as elimination from the playoff entry and injury.

Han Hyun-hee, who appeared in the FA market, was expected to be targeted by many teams, but there was only a cold market reaction. At that time, Lotte Giants reached out amid expectations that it might become FA MIA.

Han Hyun-hee sealed a total of 4 billion contracts with a 3+1 year contract.

In the upcoming 2023 season, he expected to play as a side-arm one-two punch with Seo Joon-won, but he played alone as a side-arm pitcher due to a problem caused by Seo Joon-won's criminal collusion.

In the 2023 and 2024 seasons, Han Hyun-hee was nicknamed "Trenspomer" as he showed an ever-changing appearance of starting pitcher if there is a lack of starting pitcher without a set position, and relief pitcher if there is no relief pitcher.

== Pitching styles ==
As a sidearm pitcher Han combines a fastball that averages early 90 mph with a curveball and a circle changeup.
