= Issei Endō =

Japanese baseball player (born 1989)

Issei Endō 遠藤一星
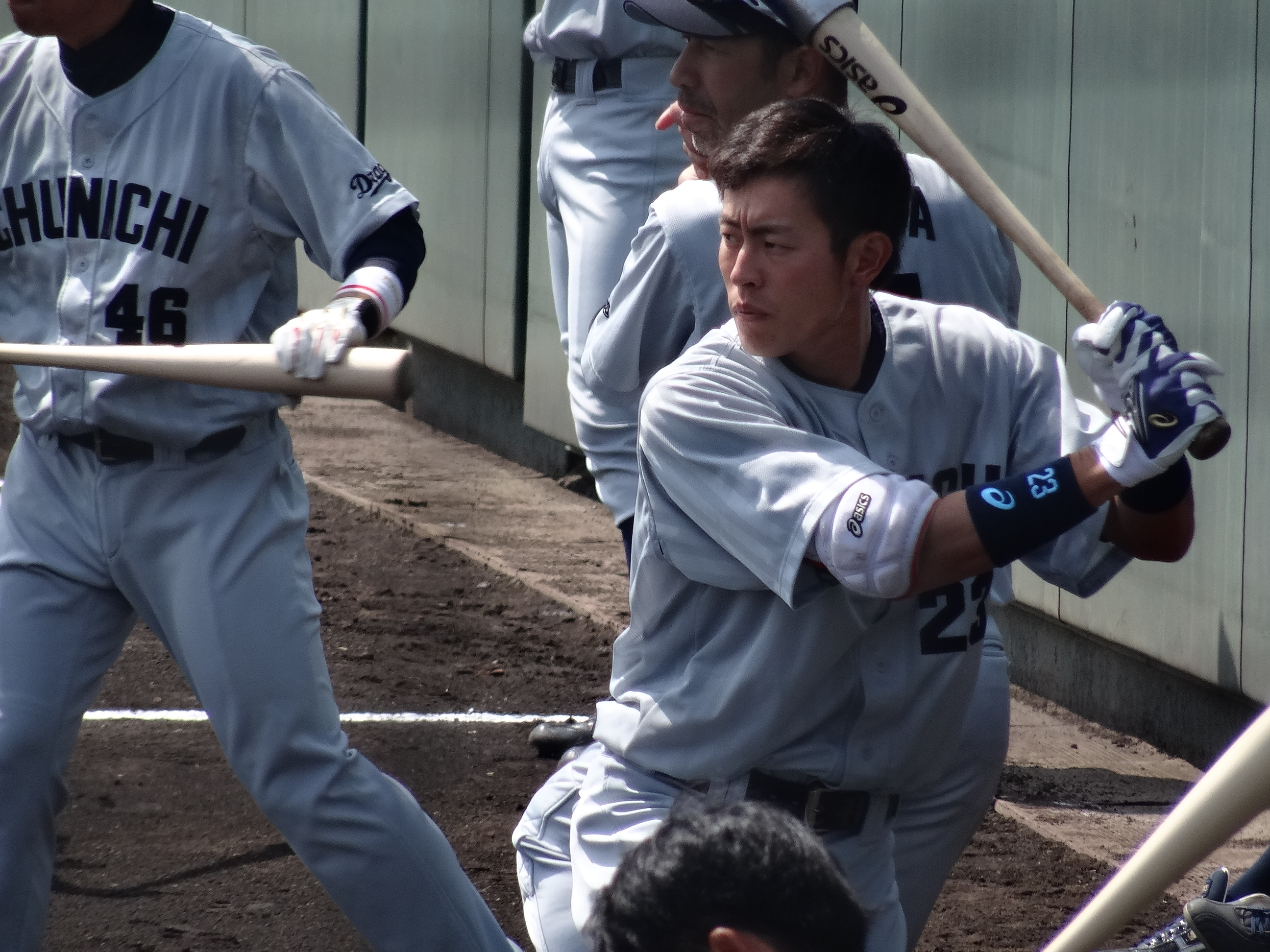
- Infielder
- Born: March 23, 1989 (age 37)
- Bats: Left Throws: Right

NPB debut
- June 27, 2015, for the Chunichi Dragons

NPB statistics (through 2020 season)
- Batting average: .242
- Home runs: 8
- RBI: 43
- Stats at Baseball Reference

Teams
- Chunichi Dragons (2015–2021)
Medals
Men's baseball
Representing Japan
Asian Games
Bronze medal – third place	2014 Incheon	Team

Issei Endō (遠藤 一星, Endō Issei; born March 23, 1989) is a Japanese professional baseball infielder. He is currently a free agent. He previously played for the Chunichi Dragons in Japan's Nippon Professional Baseball.
