= Toshihiko Kuramoto =

Japanese baseball player (born 1991)

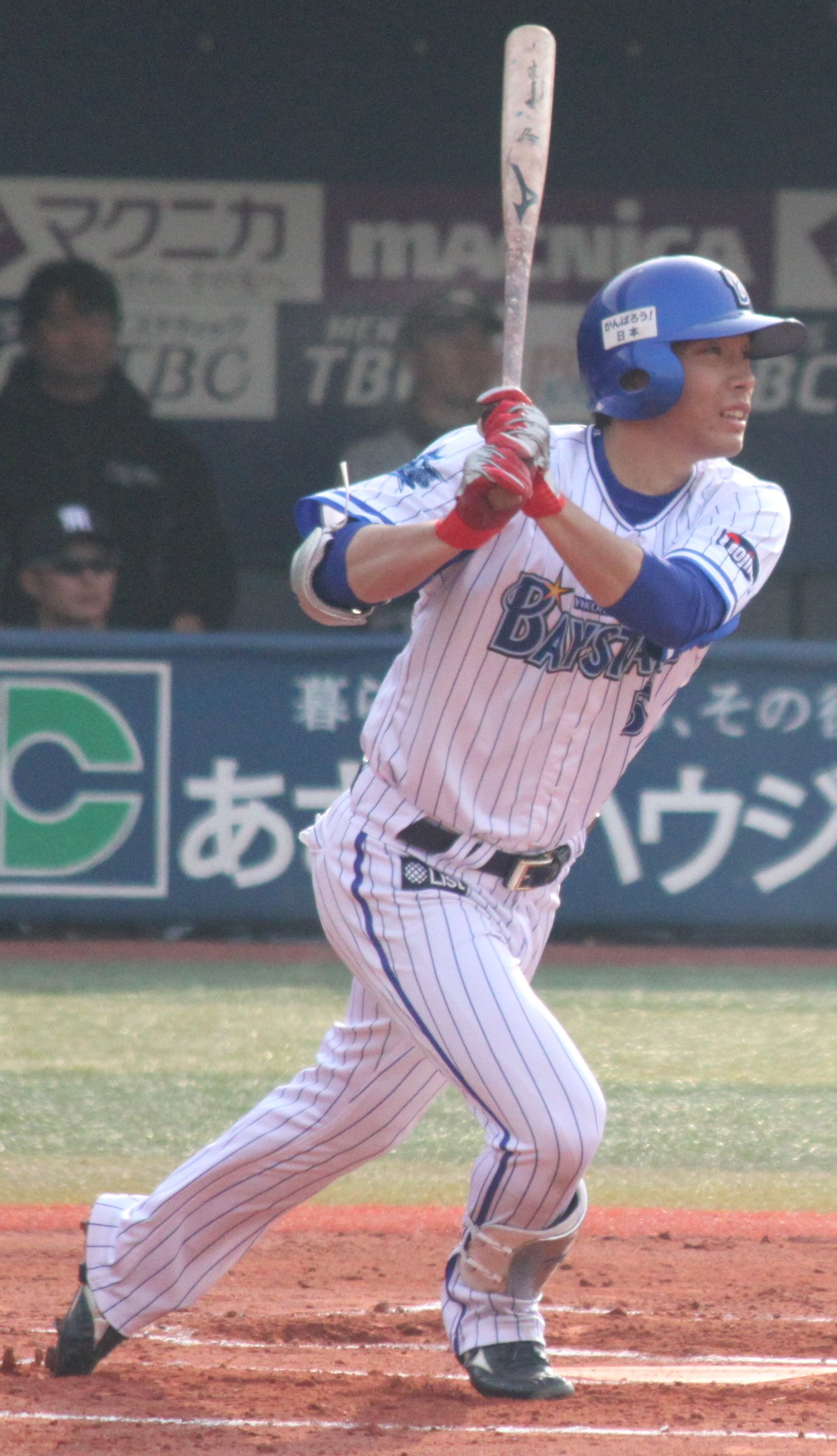
- Kuramoto with the Yokohama DeNA BayStars
- Infielder
- Born: January 7, 1991 (age 35); Chigasaki, Kanagawa, Japan
- Bats: Left Throws: Right

NPB debut
- March 27, 2015, for the Yokohama DeNA BayStars

Career statistics (through 2022 season)
- Batting average: .255
- Home runs: 8
- Runs batted in: 149
- Stats at Baseball Reference

Teams
- Yokohama DeNA BayStars (2015–2022)

Toshihiko Kuramoto (倉本 寿彦, Kuramoto Toshihiko; born January 7, 1991 in Chigasaki, Kanagawa, Japan) is a professional Japanese baseball player. He plays infielder for the Yokohama DeNA BayStars.
