= Yoo Won-sang =

South Korean baseball player (born 1986)

LG Twins
- Pitcher / Coach
- Born: June 17, 1986 (age 40); Seoul, South Korea
- Bats: Right Throws: Right

KBO debut
- September 8, 2007, for the Hanwha Eagles

KBO statistics (through July 5, 2020)
- Wins-Losses: 32-51
- ERA: 5.10
- Strikeouts: 482
- Stats at Baseball Reference

Teams
- As player: Hanwha Eagles (2006–2010); LG Twins (2011–2017); NC Dinos (2018–2019); KT Wiz (2020–2021); As coach: South Korea Women Baseball Team (2023); LG Twins (2027–present)

- Yoo Won-sang
- Hangul: 유원상
- Hanja: 柳元相
- RR: Yu Wonsang
- MR: Yu Wŏnsang

Yoo Won-sang (born June 17, 1986) is a South Korean professional baseball player for the KT Wiz of the KBO League. He is the son of former KBO catcher Yoo Seung-an, and the brother of fellow KBO player Yoo Min-sang.

Yoo Won-sang represented the South Korea national baseball team at the 2013 World Baseball Classic.
