= Oh Jae-won =

South Korean baseball player

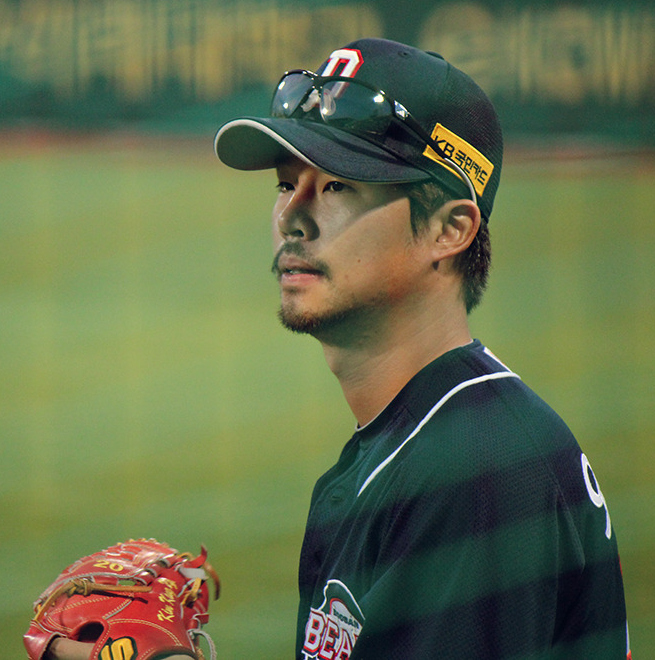
- Infielder
- Born: February 9, 1985 (age 41); Seoul, South Korea
- Batted: Left Threw: Right

KBO debut
- June 13, 2007, for the Doosan Bears

Last appearance
- October 8, 2022, for the Doosan Bears

KBO statistics
- Batting average: .267
- Home runs: 64
- RBI: 521
- Stats at Baseball Reference

Teams
- Doosan Bears (2007–2022)
Medals
Men's baseball
Representing South Korea
2015 WBSC Premier12
Gold medal – first place	2015 Tokyo	Team

- Oh Jae-won
- Hangul: 오재원
- Hanja: 吳載元
- RR: O Jaewon
- MR: O Chaewŏn

Oh Jae-won (born February 9, 1985) is a retired South Korean professional baseball infielder who spent his entire career with the Doosan Bears of the KBO League. He graduated from Yatap High School and was selected by the Doosan Bears in a 2003 draft, but did not join the Bears and went to college. After graduating from college, he joined the team in 2007.
