= Ryota Sekiya =

Japanese baseball player

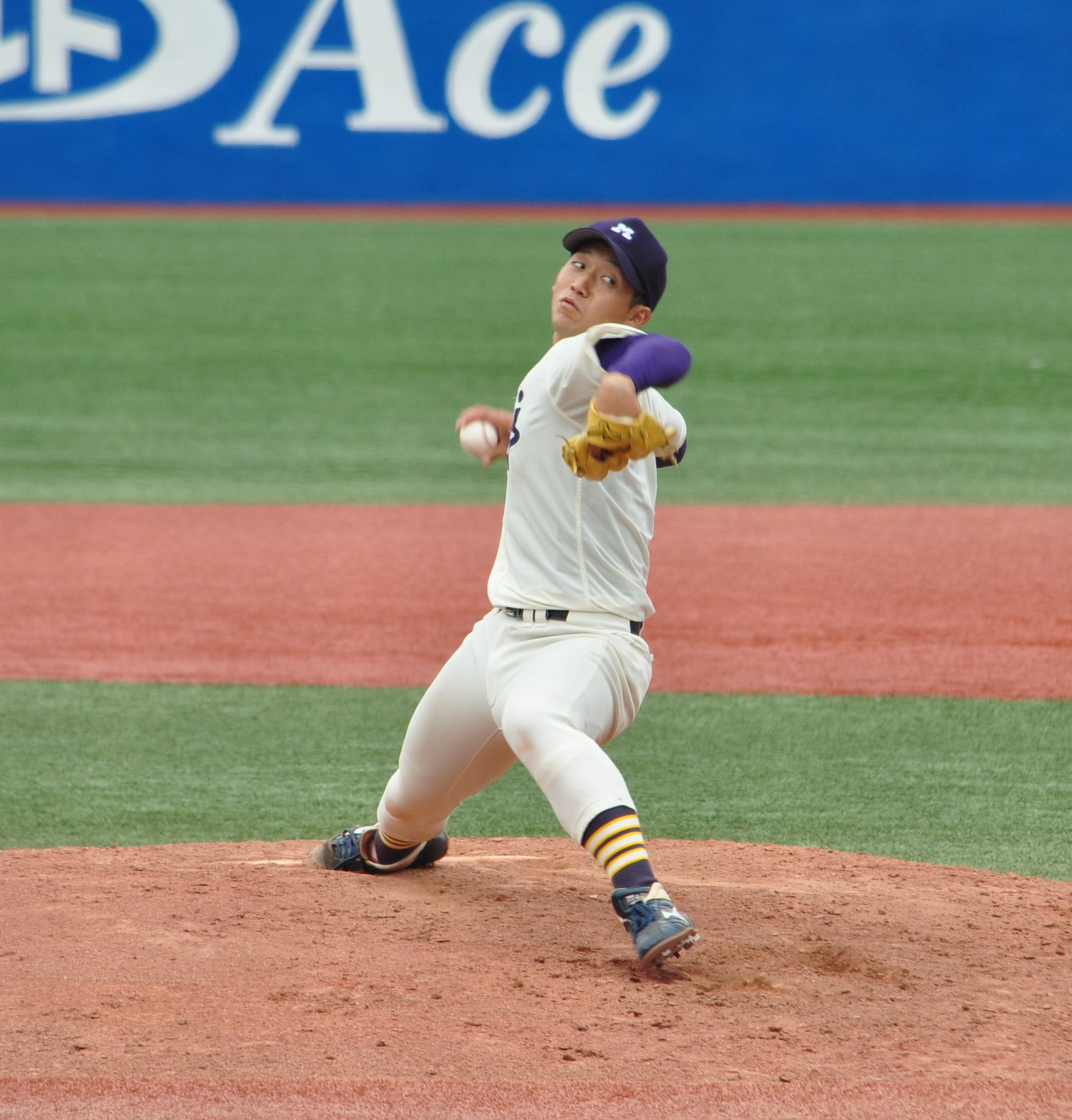
- Pitcher
- Born: May 10, 1991 (age 34); Kawasaki, Kanagawa, Japan
- Bats: Right Throws: Right

NPB debut
- May 21, 2016, for the Chiba Lotte Marines

NPB statistics (through 2018)
- Win–loss record: 7–10
- ERA: 4.96
- Strikeouts: 98
- Stats at Baseball Reference

Teams
- Chiba Lotte Marines (2016–2018)

Ryota Sekiya (関谷 亮太, Sekiya Ryōta; born May 10, 1991 in Kawasaki, Kanagawa, Japan) is a former Nippon Professional Baseball player. He played for the Chiba Lotte Marines in Japan's Pacific League from 2016 to 2018.
