= Chen Kuan-yu =

Taiwanese baseball player (born 1990)

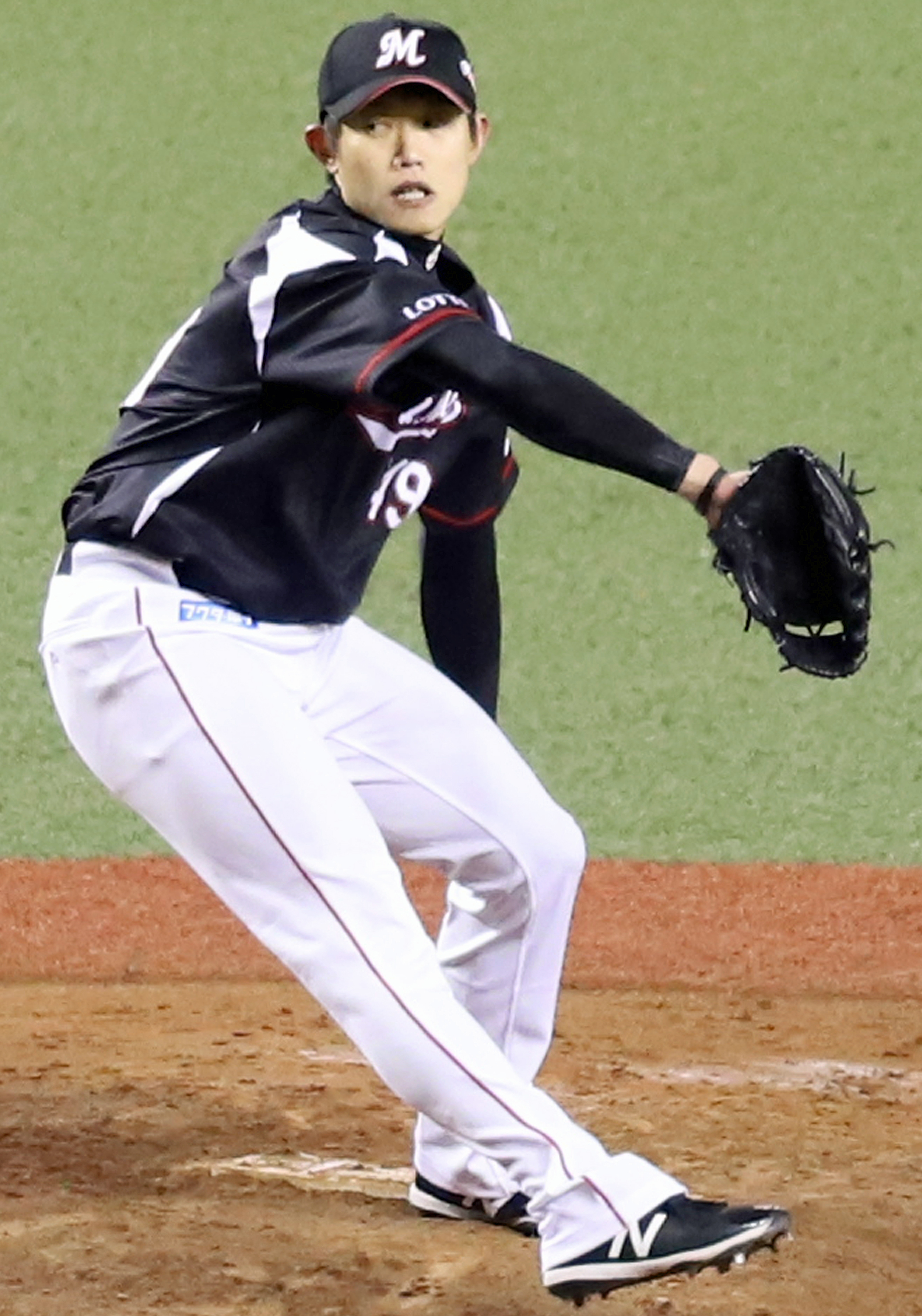
- Chen with the Chiba Lotte Marines

Rakuten Monkeys – No. 17
- Pitcher
- Born: October 29, 1990 (age 35); New Taipei City, Taiwan
- Bats: Left Throws: Left

Professional debut
- NPB: July 16, 2014, for the Yokohama BayStars
- CPBL: August 24, 2021, for the Rakuten Monkeys

NPB statistics (through 2020 season)
- Win–loss record: 11–11
- Earned run average: 3.58
- Strikeouts: 216

CPBL statistics (through 2025 season)
- Win–loss record: 9–14
- Earned run average: 3.32
- Strikeouts: 227
- Stats at Baseball Reference

Teams
- Yokohama BayStars / Yokohama DeNA BayStars (2011–2014); Chiba Lotte Marines (2015–2020); Rakuten Monkeys (2021–present)

Career highlights and awards
- Taiwan Series champion (2025)
Medals
Men's baseball
Representing Chinese Taipei
WBSC Premier12
Gold medal – first place	2024	Team

Chen Kuan-yu (Chinese: 陳冠宇; born October 29, 1990) is a Taiwanese professional baseball pitcher for the Rakuten Monkeys of the Chinese Professional Baseball League (CPBL). He has previously played in Nippon Professional Baseball (NPB) for the Yokohama BayStars/Yokohama DeNA BayStars and Chiba Lotte Marines.

== Career ==
=== Yokohama BayStars ===
While a student at National Taiwan Sport University, Chen signed a 3-year ikusei (development) contract with the Yokohama BayStars of Nippon Professional Baseball (NPB) in February, 2011. Chen underwent Tommy John surgery in 2012 and did not appear in a game that season, returning late in the 2013 season. On July 11, 2014, Chen was promoted from development player to a regular team contract (with his uniform number changing from 118 to 59) and made his official professional debut three days later at Mazda Zoom-Zoom Stadium versus the Hiroshima Carp. However, his debut game did not go well, and soon after Chen was demoted to the ni-gun squad and subsequently was released from the team in October of that same year.

=== Chiba Lotte Marines ===
Chen joined the free agent player tryouts for the Chiba Lotte Marines of NPB in November, 2014, and after a successful tryout was signed to a one-year, 6 million Japanese Yen contract in December.

In the 2015 preseason, Chen earned a spot in the Lotte starting rotation and made his debut with the team in the opening series in Fukuoka versus the defending champion SoftBank Hawks. That start ended in a loss, and for the first few months of the season Chen split time between the ichi-gun team and the ni-gun team in Urawa. However, by the summer Chen was back with the ichi-gun team on a permanent basis, and in the push for a Climax Series spot he proved invaluable, finishing the regular season with 14 2/3 consecutive innings pitched without an earned run.

Lotte re-signed Chen on January 6, 2016, with a 183% salary increase (to 17 million yen).

On December 11, 2020, Chen became a free agent.

=== Rakuten Monkeys ===
Chen subsequently returned to Taiwan, and was selected second overall in the 2021 Chinese Professional Baseball League draft, by the Rakuten Monkeys. Chen made his CPBL debut on August 24, 2021.

Chen made 55 appearances out of the bullpen for Rakuten in 2025, compiling a 3–3 record and 1.69 ERA with 47 strikeouts and five saves across 53 1/3 innings pitched. With the Monkeys, Chen won the 2025 Taiwan Series.
