= Qi Jiping =

Chinese baseball player

Sichuan Dragons
- Pitcher
- Born: December 5, 1995 (age 30); Shanghai, China
- Bats: Right Throws: Right

Qi Jiping (simplified Chinese: 奇济平; traditional Chinese: 奇濟平; pinyin: Qí Jìpíng; born December 5, 1995) is a Chinese baseball pitcher who plays with the Sichuan Dragons in the China Baseball League.

Qi represented China at the 2017 World Baseball Classic.
