= Masahiro Nishino =

Japanese baseball player (born 1990)

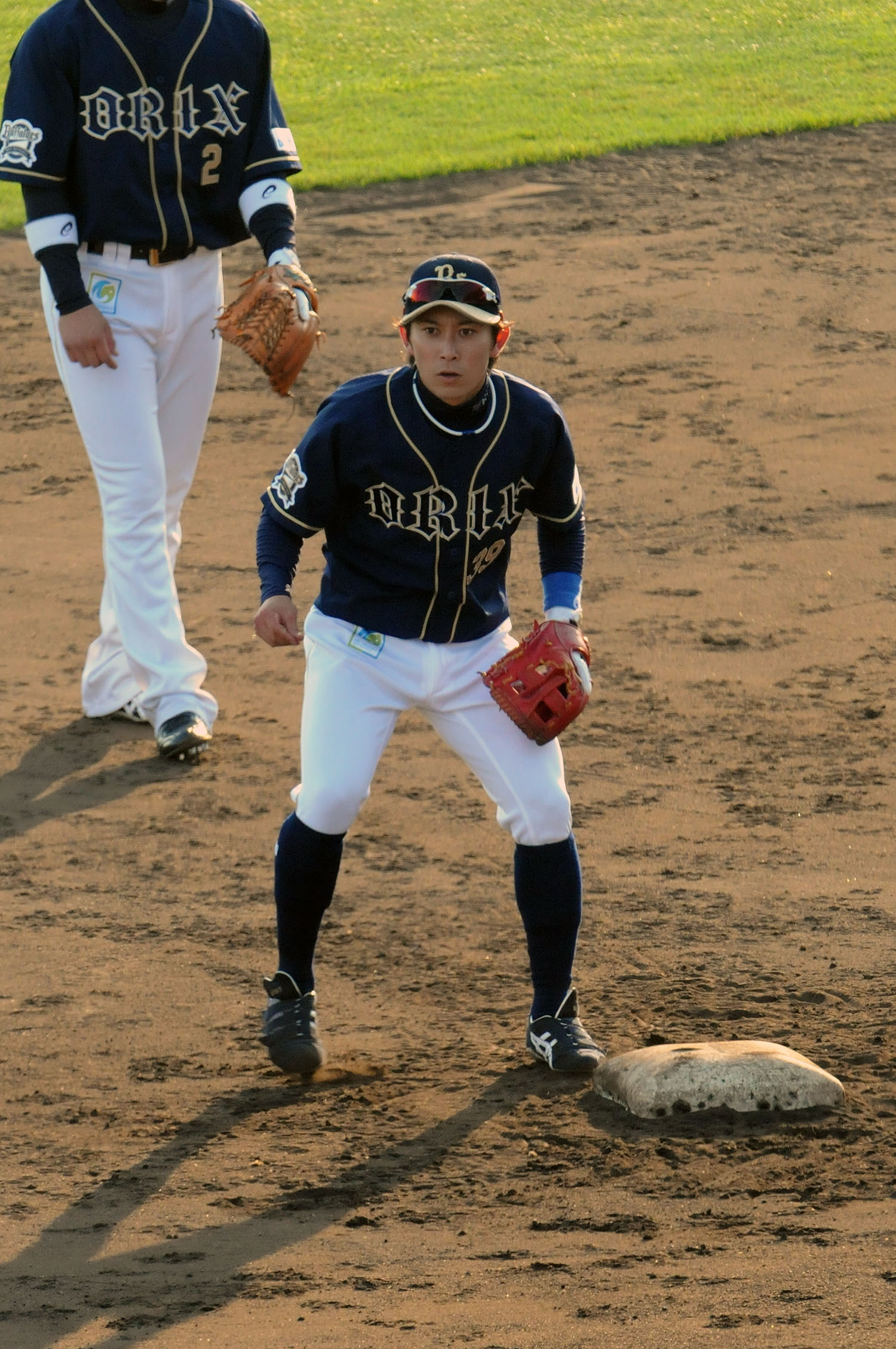

Orix Buffaloes – No. 5
- Infielder
- Born: August 2, 1990 (age 35); Edogawa, Tokyo, Japan
- Bats: Left Throws: Right

NPB debut
- April 2, 2015, for the Orix Buffaloes

NPB statistics (through 2021 season)
- Batting average: .260
- Hits: 384
- Home runs: 8
- RBIs: 110
- Stolen bases: 41
- Stats at Baseball Reference

Teams
- Orix Buffaloes (2015–present)

Career highlights and awards
- Japan Series champion (2022)

Masahiro Nishino (西野 真弘, Nishino Masahiro; born August 2, 1990 in Edogawa, Tokyo, Japan) is a professional Japanese baseball player. He plays infielder for the Orix Buffaloes.
