= Masataka Iryo =

Japanese baseball player (born 1989)

Masataka Iryo 井領雅貴
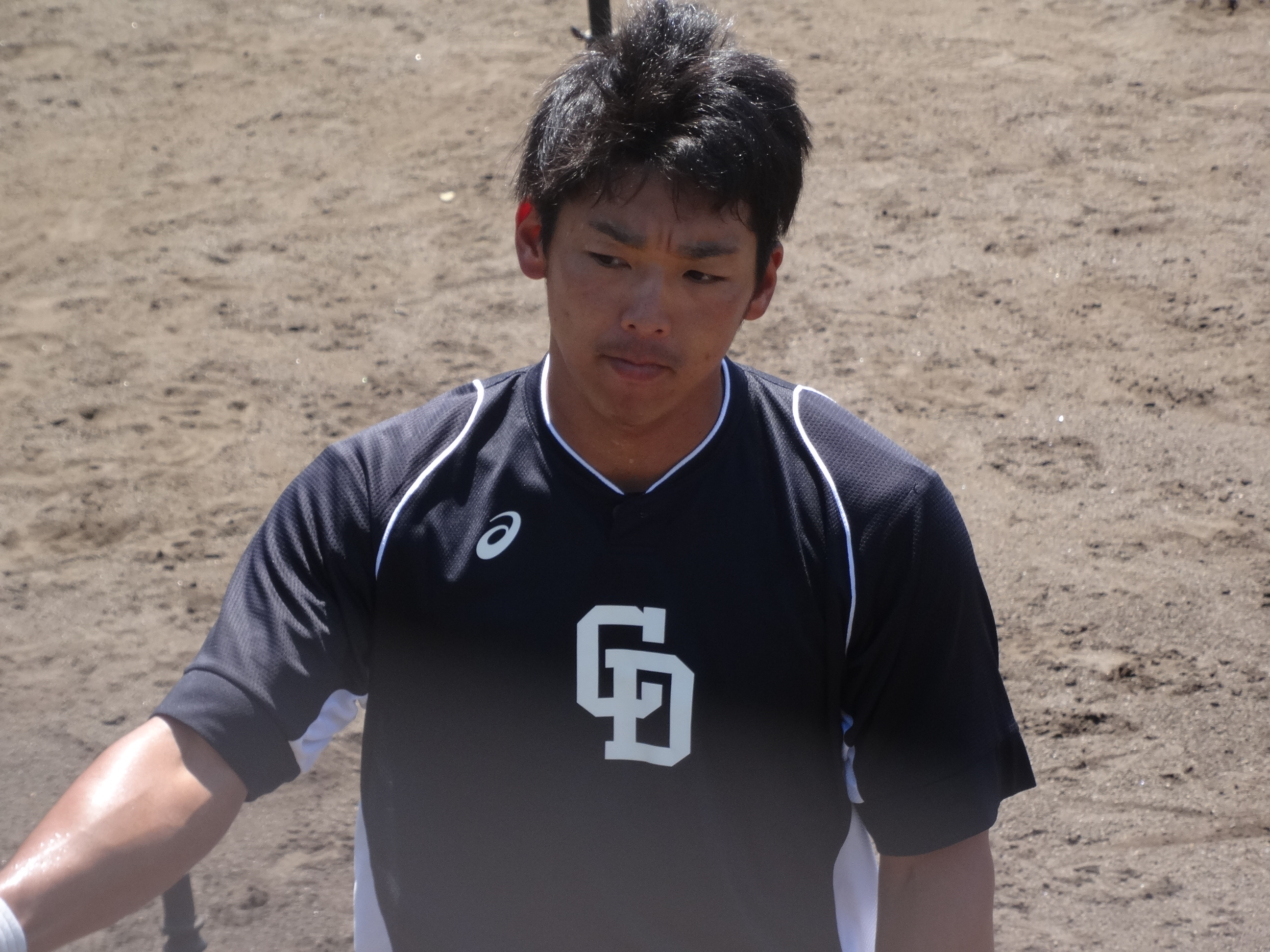
- Outfielder
- Born: November 4, 1989 (age 36); Yotsukaido, Chiba, Japan
- Bats: Left Throws: Right

NPB debut
- 2015, for the Chunichi Dragons

NPB statistics (through 2020 season)
- Batting average: .226
- Home runs: 1
- RBI: 25
- Stats at Baseball Reference

Teams
- Chunichi Dragons (2015–2021)

Masataka Iryo (井領 雅貴, Iryō Masataka; born November 4, 1989 in Yotsukaido, Chiba, Japan) is a Japanese professional baseball outfielder. He is currently a free agent. He previously played for the Chunichi Dragons in Japan's Nippon Professional Baseball.
