= Cheng Kai-wen =

Taiwanese baseball player (born 1988)

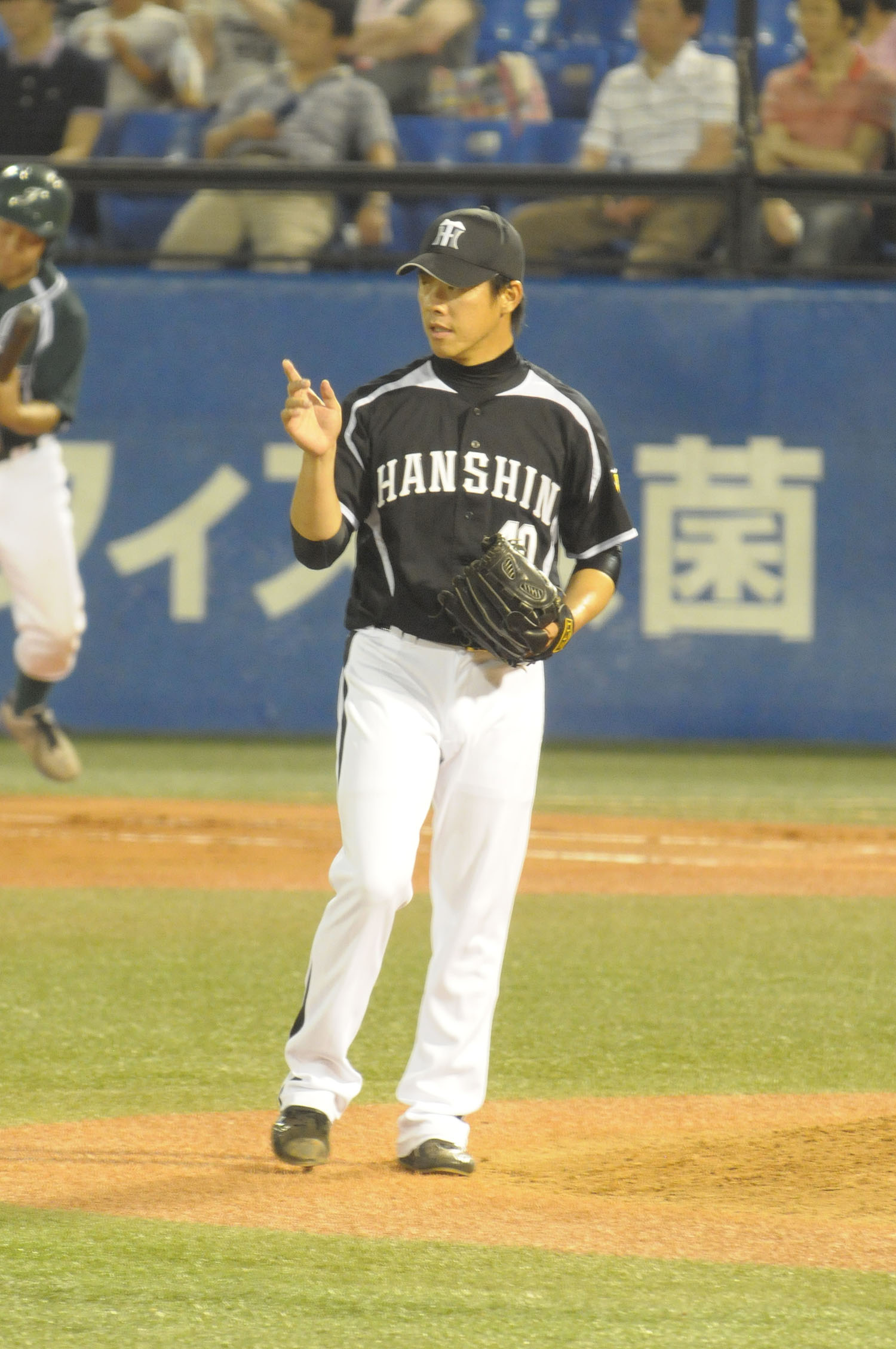
- Kai-Wen with the Hanshin Tigers

CTBC Brothers – No. 19
- Pitcher
- Born: July 26, 1988 (age 37); Tainan, Taiwan
- Bats: Right Throws: Right

Professional debut
- NPB: April 26, 2009, for the Hanshin Tigers
- CPBL: March 25, 2014, for the Chinatrust Brothers

NPB statistics (through 2013 season)
- Win–loss record: 2–3
- Earned run average: 5.16
- Strikeouts: 40

CPBL statistics (through 2025 season)
- Win–loss record: 82–56
- Earned run average: 3.82
- Strikeouts: 771
- Stats at Baseball Reference

Teams
- Hanshin Tigers (2009–2012); Yokohama DeNA BayStars (2013); Chinatrust Brothers / CTBC Brothers (2014–present)

Career highlights and awards
- 3x Taiwan Series champion (2021, 2022, 2024)

Cheng Kai-wen (Chinese: 鄭凱文; using "Cheng (ジェン)" as his registration until 2010, born July 26, 1988) is a Taiwanese professional baseball pitcher for the CTBC Brothers of the Chinese Professional Baseball League (CPBL). He has previously played in Nippon Professional Baseball (NPB) for the Hanshin Tigers and Yokohama DeNA BayStars.

== Career ==
=== Hanshin Tigers ===
Cheng was signed to a one-year contract with the Hanshin Tigers in 2009. Cheng played with the Tigers through the 2012 season.

=== Yokohama DeNA BayStars ===
Cheng signed with the Yokohama DeNA BayStars of Nippon Professional Baseball for the 2013 season. He made six appearances (five starts) for Yokohama, but struggled to an 0-2 record and 7.29 ERA with 11 strikeouts over 21 innings of work.

=== Chinatrust / CTBC Brothers ===
After the year, Cheng signed with the Chinatrust Brothers, whom he began playing for in 2014.

== International career ==
He was selected Chinese Taipei national baseball team at the 2008 Summer Olympics, 2009 World Baseball Classic and 2018 MLB Japan All-Star Series exhibition game against Japan
