= 2023 in baseball =

The following are the baseball events of the year 2023 throughout the world.

== International competition ==
=== National Team tournaments ===
- World Baseball Classic: Japan
- U-12 Baseball World Cup: USA
- U-18 Baseball World Cup: Japan
- Asian Games: South Korea
- European Baseball Championship: Spain
- Pan American Games: Colombia
- Youth Baseball5 World Cup: Cuba

=== Club team tournaments ===
- 2023 Caribbean Series: Tigres del Licey
- 2023 European Champions Cup: HCAW

== North American domestic leagues ==
=== Major League Baseball ===
Wild Card Series (ALWCS, NLWCS)
4	Tampa Bay	0
5	Texas	2
3	Minnesota	2
6	Toronto	0
4	Philadelphia	2
5	Miami	0
3	Milwaukee	0
6	Arizona	2

Division Series (ALDS, NLDS)
1	Baltimore	0
5	Texas	3
American League
2	Houston	3
3	Minnesota	1
1	Atlanta	1
4	Philadelphia	3
National League
2	LA Dodgers	0
6	Arizona	3

Championship Series (ALCS, NLCS)
5	Texas	4
2	Houston	3
4	Philadelphia	3
6	Arizona	4

World Series
AL5	Texas	4
NL6	Arizona	1

=== Minor League Baseball ===
- Triple–A
  - International League: Norfolk Tides (Baltimore Orioles)
  - Pacific Coast League: Oklahoma City Dodgers (Los Angeles Dodgers)
    - Triple-A National Championship Game: Norfolk Tides (Baltimore Orioles)
- Double–A
  - Eastern League: Erie SeaWolves (Detroit Tigers)
  - Southern League: Tennessee Smokies (Chicago Cubs)
  - Texas League: Amarillo Sod Poodles (Arizona Diamondbacks)
- High–A
  - Midwest League: Cedar Rapids Kernels (Minnesota Twins)
  - Northwest League: Vancouver Canadians (Toronto Blue Jays)
  - South Atlantic League: Greenville Drive (Boston Red Sox)
- Single–A
  - California League: Modesto Nuts (Seattle Mariners)
  - Carolina League: Charleston RiverDogs (Tampa Bay Rays)
  - Florida State League: Jupiter Hammerheads (Miami Marlins)
- Rookie
  - Arizona Complex League: ACL Brewers (Milwaukee Brewers)
  - Dominican Summer League: DSL Dodgers Batista (Los Angeles Dodgers)
  - Florida Complex League: FCL Braves (Atlanta Braves)
- Fall League
  - Arizona Fall League: Surprise Saguaros

=== MLB Partner Leagues ===
- American Association of Professional Baseball: Kansas City Monarchs
- Atlantic League of Professional Baseball: Lancaster Barnstormers
- Frontier League: Québec Capitales
- Pioneer League: Ogden Raptors

=== Independent baseball leagues ===
- Empire Professional Baseball League: Malone Border Hounds
- Pecos League: San Rafael Pacifics
- United Shore Professional Baseball League: Utica Unicorns

=== College Baseball ===
- 2023 College World Series: LSU
- Division II: Angelo State
- Division III: Lynchburg
- NAIA: Westmont
- Junior College World Series
  - Division I: Central Florida
  - Division II:Heartland College
  - Division III: Rowan College
  - California: Santa Ana College

=== Collegiate Summer Baseball Leagues ===
- Appalachian League: Johnson City Doughboys
- Cape Cod League: Bourne Braves
- MLB Draft League: West Virginia Black Bears
- New England Collegiate Baseball League: Newport Gulls

=== Little League ===
- Little League World Series: El Segundo Little League (El Segundo, California)
- Intermediate League World Series: West Seoul Little League (Seoul, South Korea)
- Junior League World Series: Tao-Yuan Junior Little League (Taoyuan, Taiwan)
- Senior League World Series: Pabao Little League (Willemstad, Curacao)

== Other domestic leagues ==
=== Summer leagues ===
- China Baseball League: Shanghai Ossen Red Eagles
- Cuban National Series: Leñadores de Las Tunas
- Dutch League—Holland Series: Amsterdam Pirates
- Finnish League: Espoo Expos
- French League: Barracudas de Montpellier
- German League: Heidenheim Heideköpfe
- Irish League: Mariners Baseball
- Italian League: UnipolSai Bologna
- KBO League—Korean Series: LG Twins
- Nippon Professional Baseball—Japan Series: Hanshin Tigers
  - Central League: Hanshin Tigers
  - Pacific League: Orix Buffaloes
- Mexican League: Pericos de Puebla
- Spanish League: Tenerife Marlins
- Swedish League:Rättvik Butchers
- Taiwan League: Wei Chuan Dragons

=== Winter leagues ===
- Australian Baseball League: Adelaide Giants
- Colombian League: Vaqueros de Montería
- Cuban Elite League: Agricultores
- Curaçao Professional League: Curaçao Suns
- Dominican League: Tigres del Licey
- Mexican Pacific League: Cañeros de Los Mochis
- Nicaraguan League: Indios del Bóer
- Panamanian League: Federales de Chiriquí
- Puerto Rican League: Indios de Mayagüez
- Venezuelan League: Leones del Caracas

== Events ==
=== January ===
- January 24: The results of the Baseball Writers' Association of America's voting for the 2023 Hall of Fame induction class were announced. Scott Rolen was the only candidate elected.
- January 28: Baseball Writers Association Dinner returns after a 2-year hiatus due to COVID-19 pandemic.

=== February ===
- February 15: Pitchers and catchers report to spring training
- February 17: The 2023 NCAA Division I baseball season begins
- February 20: Spring Training begins for other MLB Players
- February 24: Spring Training Begins for a few teams
- February 25: Spring Training Begins for all teams

=== March ===
- March 8–21: 2023 World Baseball Classic
- March 28: Spring Training ends
- March 30: 2023 Major League Baseball season begins

=== April ===
- April 6: Opening Day for All Minor League Teams
- April 15: Jackie Robinson Day

=== May ===
- May 14: Mother's Day
- May 29: Memorial Day

=== June ===
- June 16–27: The 2023 Men's College World Series takes place at Charles Schwab Field Omaha, with the LSU Tigers winning their 7th MCWS title, and first since 2009, in the 3-game final over Florida.
- June 18: Father's Day
- June 28: At the Oakland Coliseum, Domingo Germán of the New York Yankees pitches the 24th perfect game in Major League history as the Yankees defeat the Oakland Athletics 11-0. Germán throws 99 pitches, 72 for strikes, and strikes out nine in completing the fourth perfect game in Yankee history, following those authored by Don Larsen (October 8, 1956, Game 5 of the World Series), David Wells (May 17, 1998), and David Cone (July 18, 1999). A native of the Dominican Republic, Germán becomes the third pitcher born outside the United States to pitch a perfect game, joining Nicaragua native Dennis Martínez (July 28, 1991) and Venezuela native Félix Hernández (August 15, 2012), the latter's having been the last perfect game prior to Germán's.

=== July ===
- July 4: Independence Day
- July 11: 2023 MLB All-Star Game at T-Mobile Park in Seattle, Washington
- July 23: Induction Ceremonies for the National Baseball Hall of Fame and Museum in Cooperstown, New York

=== August ===
- August 1: (6 p.m. ET) Trading Deadline
- August 17–27: The 2023 Little League World Series was held in South Williamsport, Pennsylvania
- August 31: MLB's postseason-eligible deadline for players acquired via waiver claim

=== September ===
- September 1: MLB active rosters expand from 26 to 28 players
- September 4: Labor Day
- September 15: Roberto Clemente Day

=== October ===
- October 1: End of the Major League Baseball Regular season

=== Postseason ===
- October 3: American League Wild Card Series And National League Wild Card Series begins
- October 7: American League Division Series and National League Division Series begins
- October 15: American League Championship Series begins
- October 16: National League Championship Series begins
- October 27: 2023 World Series begins

=== November ===
- November 1: Texas Rangers defeat the Arizona Diamondbacks in Game 5 of the 2023 MLB World Series, to win the championship.
- Immediately after World Series: Eligible players become free agents.
- November 6: Trading window opens.
- November 9: Deadline for clubs to make qualifying offers to their eligible players who become free agents.
- November 10: First Day of free agents may sign contracts with a club other than a former club.
- November 16: Last day for article xx (B) free agents to accept a qualifying offer from a former club (midnight EST). MLB owners approve of Oakland Athletics relocation to Las Vegas.

=== December ===
- December 4–7: Winter Meetings
- December 7: Rule 5 Draft

== Deaths ==
=== January ===
- January 2 – Cliff Gustafson, 91, Hall of Fame coach at the University of Texas for 29 years who took the team to the College World Series 17 times, capturing titles in 1975 and 1983.
- January 5
  - Nate Colbert, 76, All-Star first baseman for the Padres and four other teams who holds San Diego's career record of 163 home runs; had the first 100-RBI season in San Diego history, driving in 111 runs in 1972.
  - Carl Duser, 90, pitcher who made three appearances for the Kansas City Athletics in 1956 and 1958; earned win in 1958 Caribbean Series before career-ending car crash later that year.
- January 6 – Bill Campbell, 74, All-Star relief pitcher for seven teams from 1973 to 1987 who picked up 17 wins and 20 saves for 1976 Twins, led American League with 31 saves with 1977 Red Sox.
- January 12
  - Ted Savage, 85, outfielder for eight teams between 1962 and 1971 who batted .279 with 12 home runs for the 1970 Brewers; MVP of the International League in 1961.
  - Lee Tinsley, 53, outfielder for three teams, primarily the Red Sox, who was the center fielder for Boston's 1995 division champions; later a coach for three clubs.
- January 13 – Bill Davis, 80, first baseman for the Indians and Padres between 1965 and 1969 who started the first major league game in San Diego history; named the Pacific Coast League's Top Prospect in 1965.
- January 16 – Frank Thomas, 93, All-Star outfielder and third baseman for seven National League teams who drove in 100 runs twice for Pirates, hit 20 home runs nine times with four different clubs; led 1962 expansion Mets with 34 home runs and 94 RBI.
- January 19 – Bert Peña, 63, Puerto Rican shortstop for the Astros, usually as a defensive replacement; drove in 60 runs three times with the Tucson Toros, later managed the Puerto Rican national team.
- January 20 – Sal Bando, 78, 4-time All-Star third baseman for the A's and Brewers who was MVP runner-up for Oakland's 1971 division champions, becoming team captain on three straight World Series champions; led AL in doubles and total bases in 1973, hit 20 home runs six times and drove in 100 runs twice; later served as Milwaukee's general manager from 1991 to 1999.
- January 23
  - Hiromitsu Kadota, 74, Japanese Hall of Fame outfielder whose 567 career home runs, most for the Nankai Hawks, rank third in the history of Nippon Professional Baseball; won MVP Award at age 40.
  - Bill Schonely, 93, notable and longtime Pacific Northwest sportscaster who was a member of the 1969 Seattle Pilots radio team during its maiden, and only, season in Seattle before it relocated to Milwaukee.
- January 26 – Gary Peters, 85, All-Star pitcher who won 124 games for the White Sox and Red Sox, was 1963 Rookie of the Year after winning 19 games for Chicago; won 20 games in 1964, led AL in ERA twice; noted for strong hitting with 19 home runs, batting as high as .271.
- January 30 – John Adams, 71, Indians superfan known for playing a bass drum in the stands for nearly every home game for 47 years beginning in 1973.
- January 31 – Dave Elder, 47, relief pitcher for the Indians in 2002 and 2003.

=== February ===
- February 2 – Ron Campbell, 82, infielder who played 52 games with the Cubs from 1964 to 1966, batting .272 in his September 1964 debut; hit .313 with 1963 Amarillo Gold Sox.
- February 4 – Pete Koegel, 75, catcher and infielder with the Brewers and Phillies from 1970 to 1972; batted .309 with 1971 Eugene Emeralds, set Venezuelan League record with 65 RBI in 1974.
- February 4 – Ron Tompkins, 78, relief pitcher with the 1965 Kansas City A's and 1971 Cubs who led the 1972 Wichita Aeros with 20 saves.
- February 10 – Satoshi Iriki, 55, Japanese pitcher who was 10-3 with the 2001 Japan Series champion Yakult Swallows.
- February 12 – Brian DuBois, 55, pitcher for the 1989-1990 Tigers who was 12-4 with the 1988 Hagerstown Suns.
- February 16 – Alex Herrera, 43, Venezuelan relief pitcher for the Indians in 2002 and 2003.
- February 16 – Tim McCarver, 81, All-Star catcher, mostly with the Cardinals and Phillies, who led NL in triples in 1966, helped lead St. Louis to 1967 World Series title; went on to 40-year broadcasting career, winning Ford C. Frick Award and multiple Emmy Awards.
- February 21 – Albie Pearson, 88, All-Star center fielder for three AL teams who was American League Rookie of the Year with 1958 Senators; led league in runs with 1962 Angels, then batted .304 in 1963.
- February 22 – Román Mejías, 97, Cuban outfielder, primarily with the Pirates, who led the 1962 expansion Houston Colt .45s in most offensive categories, including 24 home runs and 76 RBI.
- February 25 – Dave Nicholson, 83, left fielder for four teams who hit 22 home runs for 1963 White Sox; hit one of baseball's longest home runs; hit 30 home runs twice in minor leagues, including 34 for 1968 Richmond Braves.
- February 26 – Sandy Valdespino, 84, Cuban left fielder for the Twins and four other clubs who batted .261 as a rookie for Minnesota's 1965 pennant winners; won batting titles in Cuban Winter League's final season in 1961 and International League in 1964.
- February 28 – Jean Faut, 97, All-Star pitcher in the All-American Girls Professional Baseball League whose 140 wins ranked second in league history; won Triple Crown twice, led league in strikeouts three times, pitched four no-hitters including a pair of perfect games.

=== March ===
- March 5 – Dave Wills, 58, radio broadcaster for the Tampa Bay Rays since 2005.
- March 13 – Joe Pepitone, 82, First baseman and centerfielder who played 12 MLB seasons for four Major League Baseball teams New York Yankees, Houston Astros, Chicago Cubs and Atlanta Braves; he started his career in 1963 with the Yankees and finished his career in 1973 with the Cubs and Braves.
- March 23 – Joe Jones, 81, major-league coach for all or parts of seven years spanning 1987 to 2005 for the Kansas City Royals and Pittsburgh Pirates; longtime minor-league manager and instructor who spent 45 years in professional baseball.

=== April ===
- April 27 – Dick Groat, 82, shortstop who played 14 seasons for four Major League Baseball teams Pittsburgh Pirates, St. Louis Cardinals, Philadelphia Phillies and San Francisco Giants. He began his career in 1952 with the Pirates but took 2 years off due to military service. He finished his career in 1967 with the Giants.
- April 29 – Mike Shannon, 83, third baseman and rightfielder who played nine seasons (1962–1970) for the St. Louis Cardinals, and for 50 years, 1972–2021, their longest radio broadcaster on KMOX. From 2003 to 2021, their lead broadcaster.

=== May ===
- May 6 – Vida Blue, 73, All-Star pitcher who won 209 games, was named the American League MVP and Cy Young Award in 1971 and led the Oakland Athletics to 3 straight world championships from 1972 to 1974. He pitched in 2 no-hitters and led the American League in ERA in 1971.
- May 23 – Cotton Nash, 80, played three seasons for three major league teams from 1967 to 1970 with the White Sox and finished his career with the Twins.

=== June ===
- June 18 – Dick Hall, 92, All-Star pitcher who played 20 seasons for four MLB teams Pittsburgh Pirates, Philadelphia Athletics, Baltimore Orioles and Philadelphia Phillies from 1952-1971. He started his career with the Pirates and finished his career with the Orioles in 1971.

=== July ===
- July 13 – Eddie Bressoud, 89, MLB infielder who played 12 seasons for four Major League Baseball teams from He started his career in 1956 with San Francisco Giants, Boston Red Sox, New York Mets and finished his career in 1967 with the World Series champion St. Louis Cardinals.

=== August ===
- August 20 – Jerry Turner, 69, Played 10 seasons for three MLB teams. From 1974–83, played with the Padres for eight years then the White Sox and Tigers and finished his career with the Padres in 1983.
- August 27 – Pat Corrales, 82, Played 9 seasons for four MLB teams from 1964–73 played with the Phillies, Cardinals, Reds and finished his career in 1973 with the Padres.

=== September ===
- September 26 – Brooks Robinson, 86, Hall of Fame third baseman who spent his entire 23-year career with the Baltimore Orioles from 1955 to 1977, winning a record 16 straight Gold Glove Awards from 1960 to 1975, also the 1964 American League MVP and the 1970 World Series MVP.

=== October ===
- October 1 – Tim Wakefield, 57, played 19 MLB seasons for two teams from 1992–2011 starting in 1992 with the Pirates and finished his career in 2011 with the Boston Red Sox winning 2 World Series Championships.
- October 19 - Pete Ladd, 67, played 6 MLB seasons with three MLB teams from 1979–86 beginning with the Astros, Brewers and finished his career with the Mariners in 1986.
- October 21 - Rob Gardner, 79, played eight years for six MLB teams from 1965–73 beginning with the NY Mets, Chicago Cubs, Indians, NY Yankees, Oakland A's and finished his career in 1973 with the Brewers.
- October 30 – Frank Howard, 87, Played 16 MLB seasons from 1958–73 for three teams beginning with the NY/LA Dodgers, Senators/Rangers and warpping up his career in 1973 with the Tigers.

=== November ===
- November 14 – Peter Seidler, 63, chairman and owner of the San Diego Padres. For 12 years from 2012–2023.
- November 20 – Willie Hernández, 69, Played 13 seasons from 1977–89 with the Chicago Cubs, Phillies, and Tigers. He won a World Series championship and AL MVP with the team in 1984.
- November 24 – Ron Hodges, 74, Played all 12 MLB seasons for the New York Mets from 1973 to 1984.

=== December ===
- December 14 – Ken MacKenzie, 89, who played six seasons for four major league teams from 1960–65 beginning with the Braves, NY Mets, Cardinals, Giants and finished his career in 1965 with the Astros.

== See also ==
- 2023 Major League Baseball season
