= Liu Yu (baseball) =

Chinese baseball player

Beijing Tigers
- Pitcher
- Born: September 15, 1991 (age 34)
- Bats: Right Throws: Right

Liu Yu (born September 15, 1991) is a Chinese baseball pitcher who plays with the Beijing Tigers in the China Baseball League.

Liu represented China at the 2012 Asia Series, 2012 Asian Baseball Championship, 2013 East Asian Games, 2013 World Baseball Classic, 2014 Asian Games, 2015 Asian Baseball Championship, 2015 Summer Universiade, 2017 World Baseball Classic and 2018 Asian Games.
