= Meng Weiqiang =

Chinese baseball catcher (born 1989)

Guangdong Leopards
- Catcher / Outfielder / Pitcher
- Born: May 31, 1989 (age 37)
- Bats: Right Throws: Right

Meng Weiqiang (born May 31, 1989) is a Chinese baseball player who plays with the Guangdong Leopards in the China Baseball League. While primarily a catcher, he also is a pitcher and outfielder. This has led to some calling him 'The Chinese Ohtani'

Meng represented China at the 2012 Asia Series, 2012 Asian Baseball Championship, 2013 World Baseball Classic, 2013 East Asian Games, 2014 Asian Games, 2015 Asian Baseball Championship, 2017 World Baseball Classic and 2018 Asian Games.
