= Du Xiaolei =

Chinese baseball infielder

Jiangsu Pegasus
- Infielder
- Born: May 25, 1990 (age 36); China
- Bats: Right Throws: Right

Du Xiaolei (born May 25, 1990) is a Chinese baseball infielder who plays with the Jiangsu Pegasus in the China Baseball League.

Du represented China at the 2012 Asian Baseball Championship, 2012 Asia Series, 2013 East Asian Games, 2015 Asian Baseball Championship, 2017 World Baseball Classic and 2018 Asian Games.
