= Na Chuang =

Chinese baseball player

Guangdong Leopards
- Outfielder
- Born: May 15, 1987 (age 39)
- Bats: Left Throws: Left

Na Chuang (born May 15, 1987) is a Chinese baseball outfielder who plays with the Guangdong Leopards in the China Baseball League.

Na represented China at the 2013 East Asian Games, 2014 Asian Games, 2015 Summer Universiade, 2015 Asian Baseball Championship, 2017 World Baseball Classic and 2018 Asian Games.
