= Chu Fujia =

Chinese baseball player (born 1989)

Jiangsu Hopestars
- First Baseman
- Born: September 10, 1989 (age 36); Jiangsu, China
- Bats: Left Throws: Left

Chu Fujia (simplified Chinese: 储夫佳; traditional Chinese: 儲夫佳; pinyin: Chǔ Fūjia; born 10 September 1989 in Jiangsu, China) is a Chinese baseball infielder for the Jiangsu Hopestars.

He was a member of the China national baseball team competing in the 2009 World Baseball Classic, 2012 Asia Series, 2012 Asian Baseball Championship, 2013 World Baseball Classic, 2013 East Asian Games, 2014 Asian Games, 2015 Asian Baseball Championship, 2017 World Baseball Classic and 2018 Asian Games.
