= Baseball at the 2018 Asian Games =

- Venue: Gelora Bung Karno Baseball Field; Rawamangun Baseball Field
- Dates: 21 August – 1 September 2018
- Competitors: 213 from 10 nations

Baseball at the 2018 Asian Games was held in Jakarta, Indonesia from 21 August to 1 September 2018. A total of ten teams, the most ever, competed in the competition at two competition venues in Jakarta: Gelora Bung Karno Baseball Field and Rawamangun Baseball Field. The baseball teams of Laos, Sri Lanka and hosts Indonesia made their Asian Games baseball debut. The top six ranked teams, along with the hosts Indonesia (ranked eighth), advanced to the main draw. The bottom three teams competed, with the winner advancing to the main draw.

== Schedule ==
Q	Qualification	P	Preliminary round	S	Super round	F	Finals

Event↓/Date →	21st Tue	22nd Wed	23rd Thu	24th Fri	25th Sat	26th Sun	27th Mon	28th Tue	29th Wed	30th Thu	31st Fri	1st Sat
Men	Q	Q	Q			P	P	P		S	S	F

== Medalists ==
Event	Gold	Silver	Bronze
Men	South Korea; Im Chan-kyu; Oh Ji-hwan; Kim Ha-seong; An Chi-hong; Hwang Jae-gyun; Park Min-woo; Lee Jung-hoo; Lee Jae-won; Kim Hyun-soo; Yang Eui-ji; Choi Won-tae; Son Ah-seop; Kim Jae-hwan; Im Gi-yeong; Jang Pill-joon; Lee Yong-chan; Park Jong-hun; Choi Chung-yeon; Park Byung-ho; Yang Hyeon-jong; Jung Woo-ram; Park Hae-min; Ham Deok-ju; Park Chi-guk	Japan; Koji Chikamoto; Junpei Horimai; Sho Aoyagi; Shoji Kitamura; Momotaro Matsumoto; Asahi Sato; Tsuyoshi Tamura; Michiori Okabe; Shohei Morishita; Junya Kino; Yuichiro Okano; Yuki Jibiki; Yudai Aranishi; Isamu Usui; Makoto Hori; Takumi Takahashi; Katsutoshi Satake; Akiyoshi Katsuno; Takehiro Tsujino; Kohei Sasagawa; Ryo Kinami; Ryoga Tomiyama; Takeshi Hosoyamada	Chinese Taipei; Lin Tzu-chieh; Hsiao Po-ting; Chen Jui-mu; Lin Han; Lin Chen-fei; Tai Ju-liang; Lin Chia-yu; Wu Sheng-feng; Lin Hua-ching; Tang Chia-chun; Wang Yu-pu; Shen Hao-wei; Tsai Wei-fan; Chan Tzu-hsien; Huang Chia-wei; Wang Tsung-hao; Chiang Chien-ming; Chen Wei-chih; Lin Yu-hsiang; Wang Cheng-hao; Chen Hsiao-yun; Chen Bo-hao; Lin Cheng-hsien; Huang Chien-lung

== Draw ==
The top seven ranked teams advanced to the main draw. The bottom three teams competed in round 1, with the winner advancing to the main draw. The teams were distributed according to their position at the WBSC World Rankings.

Group A

- Japan
- China
- Pakistan
- Round 1 winner

Group B

- South Korea
- Chinese Taipei
- Hong Kong
- Indonesia

Round 1

- Sri Lanka
- Thailand
- Laos

== Squads ==
Squads

China	Chinese Taipei	Hong Kong	Indonesia
Chen Chen; Meng Weiqiang; Na Chuang; Li Ning; Yang Yanyong; Liu Yu; Du Xiaolei; Zhu Jinghao; Luan Chenchen; Chen Junpeng; Song Yunqi; Lu Zhenhong; Luo Jinjun; Chu Fujia; Lu Yusong; Yang Shunyi; Zheng Chaoqun; Sun Jianzeng; Yang Jin; Ran Song; Gan Quan; Cui Enting; Qi Xin; Gong Haicheng	Lin Tzu-chieh; Hsiao Po-ting; Chen Jui-mu; Lin Han; Lin Chen-fei; Tai Ju-liang; Lin Chia-yu; Wu Sheng-feng; Lin Hua-ching; Tang Chia-chun; Wang Yu-pu; Shen Hao-wei; Tsai Wei-fan; Chan Tzu-hsien; Huang Chia-wei; Wang Tsung-hao; Chiang Chien-ming; Chen Wei-chih; Lin Yu-hsiang; Wang Cheng-hao; Chen Hsiao-yun; Chen Bo-hao; Lin Cheng-hsien; Huang Chien-lung	Connor Kwok; Chan Cheuk Kiu; Ashley Ma; Andy Lo; Gordon Chau; Pun Wo Sau; Leung Chung Hei; Lam Lai Him; Cheng Hoi Ting; Yeung Kun Hin; Michael Yu; Matthew Andrew Holliday; Benny Tam; Sam Leung; Yuen Chun Pang; Mok Wing Tung; Li Wing Sing; Tony Wu; Leung Ho Nam; Tsang Kin Chung; Yung Tsun Wai; Kenneth Chiu; Ng Yau Pang; Liu Ho Yin	Faldy Akhmad Zulfikar; All Luthvy Jhonata; Nanda Dwi Saputra; Muharom; Hakeem Yatim; Rizki Ramadhan; Albefiandi Aiken Setiawan; Jerry Rachman; Adi Susanto; Bachtiar Sanjaya; Aditya Muflih Mahmud; Andospa Aldo Saputra; Rawafi Yaputra Yanto Rozali; Andika Arlistianto; Gunawan Pandu Khallista; Zidney Fahmidyan; Lukman Kurnia Ramdhoni; Yana Gerhana; Diva Reza Fabil; Chindy Patria Yudharana; Ramon Setiyono; Hadi Nur Muhammad; Ranjani (baseball)|Ranjani; Riski Moehammad Adjhari
Japan	Laos	Pakistan	South Korea
Koji Chikamoto; Junpei Horimai; Sho Aoyagi; Shoji Kitamura; Momotaro Matsumoto; Asahi Sato; Tsuyoshi Tamura; Michiori Okabe; Shohei Morishita; Junya Kino; Yuichiro Okano; Yuki Jibiki; Yudai Aranishi; Isamu Usui; Makoto Hori; Takumi Takahashi; Katsutoshi Satake; Akiyoshi Katsuno; Takehiro Tsujino; Kohei Sasagawa; Ryo Kinami; Ryoga Tomiyama; Takeshi Hosoyamada	Leeyang Nyiaxue; Chinu Va; Soua Xong; Phithak Hopkhop; Cola Phouangkeo; Nalor Gniatou; Boy Venvongsoth; Syvone Yelee; Long Vue; Bounmee Nyiabeemoua; Thongvanh Her; Bee Sengsoulin; Thatsaphone Soukhalom; Pakaysith Phommasee; Peun Silouanglath	Tariq Nadeem; Muhammad Sumair Zawar; Arsalan Jamashed; Faqeer Hussain; Muhammad Zakir; Muhammad Usman; Umair Imdad Bhatti; Muhammad Waseem; Muhammad Rafi; Ihsanullah; Muhammad Hussain; Muhammad Amjad Aslam; Inayatullah Khan; Jawad Ali; Fazal-ur-Rehman; Ubaidullah	Im Chan-kyu; Oh Ji-hwan; Kim Ha-seong; An Chi-hong; Hwang Jae-gyun; Park Min-woo; Lee Jung-hoo; Lee Jae-won; Kim Hyun-soo; Yang Eui-ji; Choi Won-tae; Son Ah-seop; Kim Jae-hwan; Im Gi-yeong; Jang Pill-joon; Lee Yong-chan; Park Jong-hun; Choi Chung-yeon; Park Byung-ho; Yang Hyeon-jong; Jung Woo-ram; Park Hae-min; Ham Deok-ju; Park Chi-guk
Sri Lanka	Thailand		
Sahan Avishka; Chamika Yasas; Nelanka Karunarathna; Sanjeewa Jayarathne; Shashika Dulshan; Amila Pushpakumara; Akalanka Ranasinghe; Naween Anuradha; Subas Isara Gunasiri; Sandun Madushanka; Chirath Karunarathne; Kaushala Prabuddha; Tharindu Madumal; Sameera Rathnayake; Iresh Kosala; Krishna Hapuarachchi; Sanjeewa Manna Uthum; Saliya Wijesinghe	Akaradech Jitpong; Nirawit Bunnam; Paramutt Meepakdee; Adichat Wongvichit; Sanyalak Pipatpinyo; Joe Daru; Suratit Faengsup; Netithorn Nualla-ong; Naruephol Muangkasem; Chayaphat Suanthong; Wissaroot Sihamat; Siraphop Nadee; Phoomwut Wutthikorn; Chanatip Thongbai; Phanuwat Sukmuang; Alex Clark; Thanabordee Panyimphakakul; Sarawut Jandang; Kevin Irwin; Sakai Phraechai; Jack Daru		

== Results ==
All times are Western Indonesia Time (UTC+07:00)

=== Round 1 ===
Pos	Team	Pld	W	L	RF	RA	PCT	GB	Qualification
1	Thailand	2	2	0	29	3	1.000	—	Preliminary
2	Sri Lanka	2	1	1	18	24	.500	1	
3	Laos	2	0	2	10	30	.000	2	

Source: OCA

21 August; 14:00	Thailand	15–0 (F/6)	Laos	Gelora Bung Karno Baseball Field, Jakarta; Attendance: 200; Umpires: Huang Jun-jeh (TPE)
21 August; 14:00	WP: Phanuwat Sukmuang		LP: Phithak Hopkhop	Gelora Bung Karno Baseball Field, Jakarta; Attendance: 200; Umpires: Huang Jun-jeh (TPE)
21 August; 14:00	HR: Naruephol Muangkasem (1)			Gelora Bung Karno Baseball Field, Jakarta; Attendance: 200; Umpires: Huang Jun-jeh (TPE)

Team	1	2	3	4	5	6	7	8	9	R	H	E
Laos	0	0	0	0	0	0	—	—	—	0	1	5
Thailand	2	4	4	2	2	1	—	—	—	15	13	1

22 August; 14:00	Laos	10–15	Sri Lanka	Gelora Bung Karno Baseball Field, Jakarta; Attendance: 400; Umpires: Yang Jae-man (KOR)
22 August; 14:00	LP: Cola Phouangkeo		WP: Chirath Karunarathne	Gelora Bung Karno Baseball Field, Jakarta; Attendance: 400; Umpires: Yang Jae-man (KOR)
22 August; 14:00	HR: Nalor Gniatou (1)			Gelora Bung Karno Baseball Field, Jakarta; Attendance: 400; Umpires: Yang Jae-man (KOR)

Team	1	2	3	4	5	6	7	8	9	R	H	E
Sri Lanka	4	1	0	1	5	0	0	1	3	15	16	1
Laos	2	2	0	0	1	3	2	0	0	10	13	3

23 August; 14:00	Sri Lanka	3–14 (F/7)	Thailand	Gelora Bung Karno Baseball Field, Jakarta; Attendance: 150; Umpires: Yoshinori Koide (JPN)
23 August; 14:00	LP: Sanjeewa Jayarathne		WP: Kevin Irwin	Gelora Bung Karno Baseball Field, Jakarta; Attendance: 150; Umpires: Yoshinori Koide (JPN)

Team	1	2	3	4	5	6	7	8	9	R	H	E
Thailand	1	6	0	1	0	5	1	—	—	14	21	1
Sri Lanka	0	1	0	1	1	0	0	—	—	3	9	2

=== Preliminary ===
==== Group A ====
Pos	Team	Pld	W	L	RF	RA	PCT	GB	Qualification
1	Japan	3	3	0	56	2	1.000	—	Super round
2	China	3	2	1	33	20	.667	1	Super round
3	Pakistan	3	1	2	11	32	.333	2	Consolation round
4	Thailand	3	0	3	1	47	.000	3	Consolation round

Source: OCA

26 August; 9:00	Japan	15–0 (F/6)	Pakistan	Rawamangun Baseball Field, Jakarta; Attendance: 200; Umpires: Huang Jun-jeh (TPE)
26 August; 9:00	WP: Yudai Aranishi	Boxscore	LP: Tariq Nadeem	Rawamangun Baseball Field, Jakarta; Attendance: 200; Umpires: Huang Jun-jeh (TPE)
26 August; 9:00	HR: Kohei Sasagawa (1)	Boxscore		Rawamangun Baseball Field, Jakarta; Attendance: 200; Umpires: Huang Jun-jeh (TPE)

Team	1	2	3	4	5	6	7	8	9	R	H	E
Pakistan	0	0	0	0	0	0	—	—	—	0	4	1
Japan	0	4	8	1	1	1	—	—	—	15	15	0

26 August; 14:00	China	15–0 (F/6)	Thailand	Rawamangun Baseball Field, Jakarta; Attendance: 150; Umpires: Yang Jae-man (KOR)
26 August; 14:00	WP: Gan Quan	Boxscore	LP: Siraphop Nadee	Rawamangun Baseball Field, Jakarta; Attendance: 150; Umpires: Yang Jae-man (KOR)
26 August; 14:00	HR: Lu Zhenhong (1)	Boxscore		Rawamangun Baseball Field, Jakarta; Attendance: 150; Umpires: Yang Jae-man (KOR)

Team	1	2	3	4	5	6	7	8	9	R	H	E
Thailand	0	0	0	0	0	0	—	—	—	0	1	4
China	0	4	0	5	1	5	—	—	—	15	15	0

27 August; 9:00	Thailand	1–8	Pakistan	Rawamangun Baseball Field, Jakarta; Attendance: 70; Umpires: Cheung Sui Man (HKG)
27 August; 9:00	LP: Kevin Irwin	Boxscore	WP: Muhammad Usman	Rawamangun Baseball Field, Jakarta; Attendance: 70; Umpires: Cheung Sui Man (HKG)
27 August; 9:00	HR: Joe Daru (1)	Boxscore	HR: Arsalan Jamashed (1)	Rawamangun Baseball Field, Jakarta; Attendance: 70; Umpires: Cheung Sui Man (HKG)

Team	1	2	3	4	5	6	7	8	9	R	H	E
Pakistan	3	0	0	0	0	0	0	1	4	8	7	0
Thailand	1	0	0	0	0	0	0	0	0	1	6	5

27 August; 14:00	Japan	17–2 (F/5)	China	Rawamangun Baseball Field, Jakarta; Attendance: 150; Umpires: Chu Hsu-kuang (TPE)
27 August; 14:00	WP: Akiyoshi Katsuno	Boxscore	LP: Gong Haicheng	Rawamangun Baseball Field, Jakarta; Attendance: 150; Umpires: Chu Hsu-kuang (TPE)
27 August; 14:00	HR: Shohei Morishita (1), Momotaro Matsumoto (2), Tsuyoshi Tamura (1)	Boxscore		Rawamangun Baseball Field, Jakarta; Attendance: 150; Umpires: Chu Hsu-kuang (TPE)

Team	1	2	3	4	5	6	7	8	9	R	H	E
China	0	0	0	2	0	—	—	—	—	2	5	0
Japan	13	1	2	0	1	—	—	—	—	17	17	0

28 August; 9:00	Thailand	0–24 (F/5)	Japan	Rawamangun Baseball Field, Jakarta; Attendance: 130; Umpires: Sujeewa Wijayanayake (SRI)
28 August; 9:00	LP: Alex Clark	Boxscore	WP: Takumi Takahashi	Rawamangun Baseball Field, Jakarta; Attendance: 130; Umpires: Sujeewa Wijayanayake (SRI)
28 August; 9:00		Boxscore	HR: Tsuyoshi Tamura (2), Yuki Jibiki (1), Michiori Okabe (1), Asahi Sato (1), Kohei Sasagawa (1)	Rawamangun Baseball Field, Jakarta; Attendance: 130; Umpires: Sujeewa Wijayanayake (SRI)

Team	1	2	3	4	5	6	7	8	9	R	H	E
Japan	4	4	5	3	8	—	—	—	—	24	19	1
Thailand	0	0	0	0	0	—	—	—	—	0	0	2

28 August; 14:00	Pakistan	3–16 (F/7)	China	Rawamangun Baseball Field, Jakarta; Attendance: 100; Umpires: Yang Jae-man (KOR)
28 August; 14:00	LP: Ihsanullah	Boxscore	WP: Meng Weiqiang	Rawamangun Baseball Field, Jakarta; Attendance: 100; Umpires: Yang Jae-man (KOR)
28 August; 14:00		Boxscore	HR: Chen Chen (1), Song Yunqi (1)	Rawamangun Baseball Field, Jakarta; Attendance: 100; Umpires: Yang Jae-man (KOR)

Team	1	2	3	4	5	6	7	8	9	R	H	E
China	1	3	0	0	3	0	9	—	—	16	19	1
Pakistan	0	0	0	0	1	0	2	—	—	3	6	3

==== Group B ====
Pos	Team	Pld	W	L	RF	RA	PCT	GB	Qualification
1	Chinese Taipei	3	3	0	33	2	1.000	—	Super round
2	South Korea	3	2	1	37	5	.667	1	Super round
3	Hong Kong	3	1	2	11	41	.333	2	Consolation round
4	Indonesia	3	0	3	4	37	.000	3	Consolation round

Source: OCA

26 August; 12:00	Indonesia	4–7	Hong Kong	Gelora Bung Karno Baseball Field, Jakarta; Attendance: 500; Umpires: Sung Yu-meng (TPE)
26 August; 12:00	LP: Chindy Patria Yudharana	Boxscore	WP: Sam Leung; Sv: Matthew Andrew Holliday	Gelora Bung Karno Baseball Field, Jakarta; Attendance: 500; Umpires: Sung Yu-meng (TPE)
26 August; 12:00		Boxscore	HR: Matthew Andrew Holliday (1)	Gelora Bung Karno Baseball Field, Jakarta; Attendance: 500; Umpires: Sung Yu-meng (TPE)

Team	1	2	3	4	5	6	7	8	9	R	H	E
Hong Kong	0	2	0	0	0	0	2	2	1	7	11	1
Indonesia	0	0	0	0	2	1	0	1	0	4	5	1

26 August; 18:30	South Korea	1–2	Chinese Taipei	Gelora Bung Karno Baseball Field, Jakarta; Attendance: 1,750; Umpires: Tomohisa Yamaguchi (JPN)
26 August; 18:30	LP: Yang Hyeon-jong	Boxscore	WP: Wu Sheng-feng; Sv: Wang Cheng-hao	Gelora Bung Karno Baseball Field, Jakarta; Attendance: 1,750; Umpires: Tomohisa Yamaguchi (JPN)
26 August; 18:30	HR: Kim Jae-hwan (1)	Boxscore	HR: Lin Chia-yu (1)	Gelora Bung Karno Baseball Field, Jakarta; Attendance: 1,750; Umpires: Tomohisa Yamaguchi (JPN)

Team	1	2	3	4	5	6	7	8	9	R	H	E
Chinese Taipei	2	0	0	0	0	0	0	0	0	2	5	0
South Korea	0	0	0	1	0	0	0	0	0	1	6	0

27 August; 12:00	Chinese Taipei	16–1 (F/5)	Hong Kong	Gelora Bung Karno Baseball Field, Jakarta; Attendance: 100; Umpires: Park Hi-young (KOR)
27 August; 12:00	WP: Lin Cheng-hsien	Boxscore	LP: Leung Chung Hei	Gelora Bung Karno Baseball Field, Jakarta; Attendance: 100; Umpires: Park Hi-young (KOR)

Team	1	2	3	4	5	6	7	8	9	R	H	E
Hong Kong	0	0	0	1	0	—	—	—	—	1	2	0
Chinese Taipei	0	2	8	3	3	—	—	—	—	16	17	0

27 August; 18:30	South Korea	15–0 (F/5)	Indonesia	Gelora Bung Karno Baseball Field, Jakarta; Attendance: 150; Umpires: Yoshinori Koide (JPN)
27 August; 18:30	WP: Choi Won-tae	Boxscore	LP: Nanda Dwi Saputra	Gelora Bung Karno Baseball Field, Jakarta; Attendance: 150; Umpires: Yoshinori Koide (JPN)
27 August; 18:30	HR: Hwang Jae-gyun (2)	Boxscore		Gelora Bung Karno Baseball Field, Jakarta; Attendance: 150; Umpires: Yoshinori Koide (JPN)

Team	1	2	3	4	5	6	7	8	9	R	H	E
Indonesia	0	0	0	0	0	—	—	—	—	0	3	3
South Korea	1	4	6	2	2	—	—	—	—	15	13	0

28 August; 12:00	Hong Kong	3–21	South Korea	Gelora Bung Karno Baseball Field, Jakarta; Attendance: 600; Umpires: Huang Jun-jeh (TPE)
28 August; 12:00	LP: Yeung Kun Hin	Boxscore	WP: Lee Yong-chan	Gelora Bung Karno Baseball Field, Jakarta; Attendance: 600; Umpires: Huang Jun-jeh (TPE)
28 August; 12:00	HR: Matthew Andrew Holliday (1)	Boxscore	HR: Lee Jung-hoo (2), Hwang Jae-gyun (1), Lee Jae-won (1), Park Byung-ho (1)	Gelora Bung Karno Baseball Field, Jakarta; Attendance: 600; Umpires: Huang Jun-jeh (TPE)

Team	1	2	3	4	5	6	7	8	9	R	H	E
South Korea	1	0	1	3	0	3	0	3	10	21	16	0
Hong Kong	0	1	0	1	0	1	0	0	0	3	8	3

28 August; 18:30	Indonesia	0–15 (F/7)	Chinese Taipei	Gelora Bung Karno Baseball Field, Jakarta; Attendance: 750; Umpires: Katsutoshi Takahashi (JPN)
28 August; 18:30	LP: Chindy Patria Yudharana	Boxscore	WP: Huang Chien-lung	Gelora Bung Karno Baseball Field, Jakarta; Attendance: 750; Umpires: Katsutoshi Takahashi (JPN)

Team	1	2	3	4	5	6	7	8	9	R	H	E
Chinese Taipei	6	0	1	1	0	5	2	—	—	15	14	0
Indonesia	0	0	0	0	0	0	0	—	—	0	2	1

=== Consolation round ===
- The results of the matches between the same teams that were already played during the preliminary round shall be taken into account for the consolation round.

Pos	Team	Pld	W	L	RF	RA	PCT	GB
1	Pakistan	3	3	0	30	5	1.000	—
2	Hong Kong	3	2	1	14	20	.667	1
3	Indonesia	3	1	2	18	28	.333	2
4	Thailand	3	0	3	16	25	.000	3

Source: OCA

30 August; 9:00	Pakistan	10–2	Indonesia	Rawamangun Baseball Field, Jakarta; Attendance: 80; Umpires: Sung Yu-meng (TPE)
30 August; 9:00	WP: Muhammad Usman; Sv: Inayatullah Khan	Boxscore	LP: Nanda Dwi Saputra	Rawamangun Baseball Field, Jakarta; Attendance: 80; Umpires: Sung Yu-meng (TPE)
30 August; 9:00	HR: Muhammad Zakir (1), Jawad Ali (1)	Boxscore		Rawamangun Baseball Field, Jakarta; Attendance: 80; Umpires: Sung Yu-meng (TPE)

Team	1	2	3	4	5	6	7	8	9	R	H	E
Indonesia	1	0	0	0	0	1	0	0	0	2	8	4
Pakistan	0	0	0	4	0	5	0	1	X	10	12	1

30 August; 14:00	Hong Kong	5–4	Thailand	Rawamangun Baseball Field, Jakarta; Attendance: 100; Umpires: Sandy Kusuma (INA)
30 August; 14:00	WP: Sam Leung	Boxscore	LP: Siraphop Nadee	Rawamangun Baseball Field, Jakarta; Attendance: 100; Umpires: Sandy Kusuma (INA)
30 August; 14:00	HR: Benny Tam (1)	Boxscore	HR: Joe Daru (1)	Rawamangun Baseball Field, Jakarta; Attendance: 100; Umpires: Sandy Kusuma (INA)

Team	1	2	3	4	5	6	7	8	9	R	H	E
Thailand	0	2	0	0	2	0	0	0	0	4	8	3
Hong Kong	0	0	0	0	3	1	0	0	1	5	10	1

31 August; 8:00	Pakistan	12–2 (F/7)	Hong Kong	Rawamangun Baseball Field, Jakarta; Attendance: 75; Umpires: Yoshinori Koide (JPN)
31 August; 8:00	WP: Ihsanullah	Boxscore	LP: Leung Chung Hei	Rawamangun Baseball Field, Jakarta; Attendance: 75; Umpires: Yoshinori Koide (JPN)

Team	1	2	3	4	5	6	7	8	9	R	H	E
Hong Kong	0	0	1	0	0	0	1	—	—	2	6	3
Pakistan	1	1	0	4	0	1	5	—	—	12	15	0

31 August; 14:00	Indonesia	12–11	Thailand	Rawamangun Baseball Field, Jakarta; Attendance: 100; Umpires: Chu Hsu-kuang (TPE)
31 August; 14:00	WP: Andika Arlistianto; Sv: Chindy Patria Yudharana	Boxscore	LP: Kevin Irwin	Rawamangun Baseball Field, Jakarta; Attendance: 100; Umpires: Chu Hsu-kuang (TPE)
31 August; 14:00	HR: Hakeem Yatim (1)	Boxscore	HR: Suratit Faengsup (1)	Rawamangun Baseball Field, Jakarta; Attendance: 100; Umpires: Chu Hsu-kuang (TPE)

Team	1	2	3	4	5	6	7	8	9	R	H	E
Thailand	0	0	0	0	3	2	2	4	0	11	12	5
Indonesia	3	1	7	0	0	1	0	0	X	12	15	2

=== Super round ===
- The results of the matches between the same teams that were already played during the preliminary round shall be taken into account for the super round.

Pos	Team	Pld	W	L	RF	RA	PCT	GB	Qualification
1	South Korea	3	2	1	16	4	.667 (Note: Tied on head-to-head wins (1). Team quality balance: KOR +0.167, JPN +0.056, TPE −0.222.)	—	Gold medal match
2	Japan	3	2	1	23	7	.667	—	Gold medal match
3	Chinese Taipei	3	2	1	3	6	.667	—	Bronze medal match
4	China	3	0	3	3	28	.000	2	Bronze medal match

Source: OCA
Notes:

30 August; 12:00	Japan	1–5	South Korea	Gelora Bung Karno Baseball Field, Jakarta; Attendance: 637; Umpires: Chu Hsu-kuang (TPE)
30 August; 12:00	LP: Katsutoshi Satake	Boxscore	WP: Lee Yong-chan	Gelora Bung Karno Baseball Field, Jakarta; Attendance: 637; Umpires: Chu Hsu-kuang (TPE)
30 August; 12:00		Boxscore	HR: Kim Ha-seong (1), Park Byung-ho (1), Hwang Jae-gyun (1)	Gelora Bung Karno Baseball Field, Jakarta; Attendance: 637; Umpires: Chu Hsu-kuang (TPE)

Team	1	2	3	4	5	6	7	8	9	R	H	E
South Korea	0	0	2	1	2	0	0	0	0	5	14	1
Japan	0	0	0	0	0	1	0	0	0	1	6	1

30 August; 18:30	Chinese Taipei	1–0	China	Gelora Bung Karno Baseball Field, Jakarta; Attendance: 412; Umpires: Tomohisa Yamaguchi (JPN)
30 August; 18:30	WP: Huang Chien-lung; Sv: Wang Cheng-hao	Boxscore	LP: Gan Quan	Gelora Bung Karno Baseball Field, Jakarta; Attendance: 412; Umpires: Tomohisa Yamaguchi (JPN)

Team	1	2	3	4	5	6	7	8	9	R	H	E
China	0	0	0	0	0	0	0	0	0	0	6	1
Chinese Taipei	0	0	0	0	0	1	0	0	X	1	6	0

31 August; 14:00	South Korea	10–1	China	Gelora Bung Karno Baseball Field, Jakarta; Attendance: 400; Umpires: Huang Jun-jeh (TPE)
31 August; 14:00	WP: Im Gi-yeong	Boxscore	LP: Gong Haicheng	Gelora Bung Karno Baseball Field, Jakarta; Attendance: 400; Umpires: Huang Jun-jeh (TPE)
31 August; 14:00	HR: Park Byung-ho (1)	Boxscore		Gelora Bung Karno Baseball Field, Jakarta; Attendance: 400; Umpires: Huang Jun-jeh (TPE)

Team	1	2	3	4	5	6	7	8	9	R	H	E
China	0	0	0	0	0	0	1	0	0	1	8	2
South Korea	1	0	0	1	3	3	2	0	X	10	15	0

31 August; 18:30	Chinese Taipei	0–5	Japan	Gelora Bung Karno Baseball Field, Jakarta; Attendance: 500; Umpires: Park Hi-young (KOR)
31 August; 18:30	LP: Lin Hua-ching	Boxscore	WP: Yuichiro Okano; Sv: Yudai Aranishi	Gelora Bung Karno Baseball Field, Jakarta; Attendance: 500; Umpires: Park Hi-young (KOR)
31 August; 18:30		Boxscore	HR: Tsuyoshi Tamura (1)	Gelora Bung Karno Baseball Field, Jakarta; Attendance: 500; Umpires: Park Hi-young (KOR)

Team	1	2	3	4	5	6	7	8	9	R	H	E
Japan	0	2	0	0	0	1	1	1	0	5	7	0
Chinese Taipei	0	0	0	0	0	0	0	0	0	0	7	2

=== Final round ===
==== Bronze medal match ====
1 September; 11:00	Chinese Taipei	10–0 (F/8)	China	Gelora Bung Karno Baseball Field, Jakarta; Attendance: 850; Umpires: Tomohisa Yamaguchi (JPN)
1 September; 11:00	WP: Wang Tsung-hao	Boxscore	LP: Meng Weiqiang	Gelora Bung Karno Baseball Field, Jakarta; Attendance: 850; Umpires: Tomohisa Yamaguchi (JPN)
1 September; 11:00	HR: Chan Tzu-hsien (1)	Boxscore		Gelora Bung Karno Baseball Field, Jakarta; Attendance: 850; Umpires: Tomohisa Yamaguchi (JPN)

Team	1	2	3	4	5	6	7	8	9	R	H	E
China	0	0	0	0	0	0	0	0	—	0	2	2
Chinese Taipei	2	1	0	5	0	1	0	1	—	10	10	1

==== Gold medal match ====
1 September; 16:00	South Korea	3–0	Japan	Gelora Bung Karno Baseball Field, Jakarta; Attendance: 1,700; Umpires: Huang Jun-jeh (TPE)
1 September; 16:00	WP: Yang Hyeon-jong; Sv: Jung Woo-ram	Boxscore	LP: Ryoga Tomiyama	Gelora Bung Karno Baseball Field, Jakarta; Attendance: 1,700; Umpires: Huang Jun-jeh (TPE)
1 September; 16:00	HR: Park Byung-ho (1)	Boxscore		Gelora Bung Karno Baseball Field, Jakarta; Attendance: 1,700; Umpires: Huang Jun-jeh (TPE)

Team	1	2	3	4	5	6	7	8	9	R	H	E
Japan	0	0	0	0	0	0	0	0	0	0	1	0
South Korea	2	0	1	0	0	0	0	0	X	3	4	2

== Final standing ==
Rank	Team	Pld	W	L
1st place, gold medalist(s)	South Korea	6	5	1
2nd place, silver medalist(s)	Japan	6	4	2
3rd place, bronze medalist(s)	Chinese Taipei	6	5	1
4	China	6	2	4
5	Pakistan	5	3	2
6	Hong Kong	5	2	3
7	Indonesia	5	1	4
8	Thailand	7	2	5
9	Sri Lanka	2	1	1
10	Laos	2	0	2
