= Lu Zhenhong =

Chinese baseball player

Jiangsu Hopestars
- Outfielder
- Born: April 15, 1991 (age 35); China
- Bats: Right Throws: Right

Lu Zhenhong (born April 15, 1991) is a Chinese baseball outfielder who plays with the Jiangsu Hopestars in the China Baseball League.

Lu represented China at the 2012 Asia Series, 2012 Asian Baseball Championship, 2013 World Baseball Classic, 2017 World Baseball Classic and 2018 Asian Games.
