= 2023 World Baseball Classic Pool B =

Tournament details
- Country: Japan
- City: Tokyo
- Venue: Tokyo Dome
- Dates: March 9–13
- Teams: 5

Final positions
- Champions: Japan
- Runners-up: Australia

Awards
- MVP: (Japan) Shohei Ohtani

The 2023 World Baseball Classic Pool B was the second of four pools of the 2023 World Baseball Classic that took place from March 9–13 at the Tokyo Dome in Tokyo, Japan. The top two teams automatically qualified for the top eight knockout stage, beginning with the quarterfinal in Tokyo and the remaining of the bracket in Miami.

The teams in Pool B consisted of Australia, China, newcomer Czech Republic, hosts Japan, and South Korea. Japan won the pool and advanced to the quarterfinals, along with Australia as runners-up. China was relegated to the 2026 World Baseball Classic qualification round through their win percentage.

Shohei Ohtani of Japan was named the most valuable player of Pool B.

== Teams ==
Draw position	Team	Pot	Confederation	Method of qualification	Date of qualification	Finals appearance	Last appearance	Previous best performance	WBSC Rankings
B1	Japan	1	WBSC Asia	Hosts + 2017 participants	March 6, 2017	5th	2017	Champions (2006, 2009)	1
B2	South Korea	2	WBSC Asia	2017 participants	March 6, 2017	5th	2017	Runners-up (2009)	4
B3	Australia	3	WBSC Oceania	2017 participants	March 6, 2017	5th	2017	Pool stage (2006, 2009, 2013, 2017)	10
B4	China	4	WBSC Asia	2017 participants	March 6, 2017	5th	2017	Pool stage (2006, 2009, 2013, 2017)	30
B5	Czech Republic	5	WBSC Europe	Qualifiers Pool A runners-up	September 21, 2022	1st	—	—	15

== Standings ==
Pos	Team	Pld	W	L	RF	RA	PCT	GB	Qualification
1	Japan (H)	4	4	0	38	8	1.000	—	Advance to quarterfinals Qualification for 2026 World Baseball Classic
2	Australia	4	3	1	29	19	.750	1	Advance to quarterfinals Qualification for 2026 World Baseball Classic
3	South Korea	4	2	2	40	26	.500	2	Qualification for 2026 World Baseball Classic
4	Czech Republic	4	1	3	16	30	.250	3	Qualification for 2026 World Baseball Classic
5	China	4	0	4	10	50	.000	4	

Source: MLB
Rules for classification: Tiebreakers
(H) Hosts

== Summary ==
Date	Local time	Road team	Score	Home team	Inn.	Venue	Game duration	Attendance	Boxscore
Mar 9, 2023	12:00 JST	Australia	8–7	South Korea		Tokyo Dome	3:46	15,540	Boxscore
Mar 9, 2023	19:00 JST	China	1–8	Japan		Tokyo Dome	3:41	41,616	Boxscore
Mar 10, 2023	12:00 JST	Czech Republic	8–5	China		Tokyo Dome	3:54	15,625	Boxscore
Mar 10, 2023	19:00 JST	South Korea	4–13	Japan		Tokyo Dome	4:04	41,629	Boxscore
Mar 11, 2023	12:00 JST	China	2–12	Australia	7	Tokyo Dome	2:52	15,708	Boxscore
Mar 11, 2023	19:00 JST	Czech Republic	2–10	Japan		Tokyo Dome	3:26	41,637	Boxscore
Mar 12, 2023	12:00 JST	Czech Republic	3–7	South Korea		Tokyo Dome	2:55	16,129	Boxscore
Mar 12, 2023	19:00 JST	Japan	7–1	Australia		Tokyo Dome	3:18	41,664	Boxscore
Mar 13, 2023	12:00 JST	Australia	8–3	Czech Republic		Tokyo Dome	3:04	16,641	Boxscore
Mar 13, 2023	19:00 JST	South Korea	22–2	China	5	Tokyo Dome	2:37	14,442	Boxscore

== Games ==
=== Australia vs South Korea ===
March 9, 2023 12:00 PM JST at Tokyo Dome in Tokyo, Japan
Team	1	2	3	4	5	6	7	8	9	R	H	E
Australia	0	0	0	1	1	0	3	3	0	8	10	0
South Korea	0	0	0	0	3	1	0	3	0	7	7	0
WP: Jon Kennedy (1–0) LP: Kim Won-jung (0–1) Sv: Josh Guyer (1); Home runs: AUS: Tim Kennelly (1), Robbie Glendinning (1), Robbie Perkins (1); KOR: Yang Eui-ji (1); Attendance: 15,540; Umpires: HP – Ramon De Jesus, 1B – Fabrizio Fabrizi, 2B – Adam Hamari, 3B – Chan-Jung Chang; Boxscore

=== China vs Japan ===
March 9, 2023 19:00 PM JST at Tokyo Dome in Tokyo, Japan
Team	1	2	3	4	5	6	7	8	9	R	H	E
China	0	0	0	0	0	1	0	0	0	1	3	2
Japan	1	0	0	2	0	0	1	4	X	8	9	0
WP: Shohei Ohtani (1–0) LP: Wang Xiang (0–1); Home runs: CHN: Liang Pei (1); JPN: Shugo Maki (1); Attendance: 41,616; Umpires: HP - Stu Scheurwater, 1B - Cuti Suarez, 2B - Ben May, 3B - Delfin Colon; Boxscore

=== Czech Republic vs China ===
March 10, 2023 12:00 PM JST at Tokyo Dome in Tokyo, Japan
Team	1	2	3	4	5	6	7	8	9	R	H	E
Czech Republic	2	0	1	0	0	1	0	0	4	8	10	1
China	0	0	0	0	1	0	4	0	0	5	6	1
WP: Marek Minarik (1–0) LP: Hai-Cheng Gong (0–1); Home runs: CZE: Matej Mensik (1), Martin Muzik (1); CHN: None; Attendance: 15,625; Umpires: HP - Chan-Jung Chang, 1B - Pat Hoberg, 2B - Ben May, 3B - Fabrizio Fabrizi; Boxscore

=== South Korea vs Japan ===
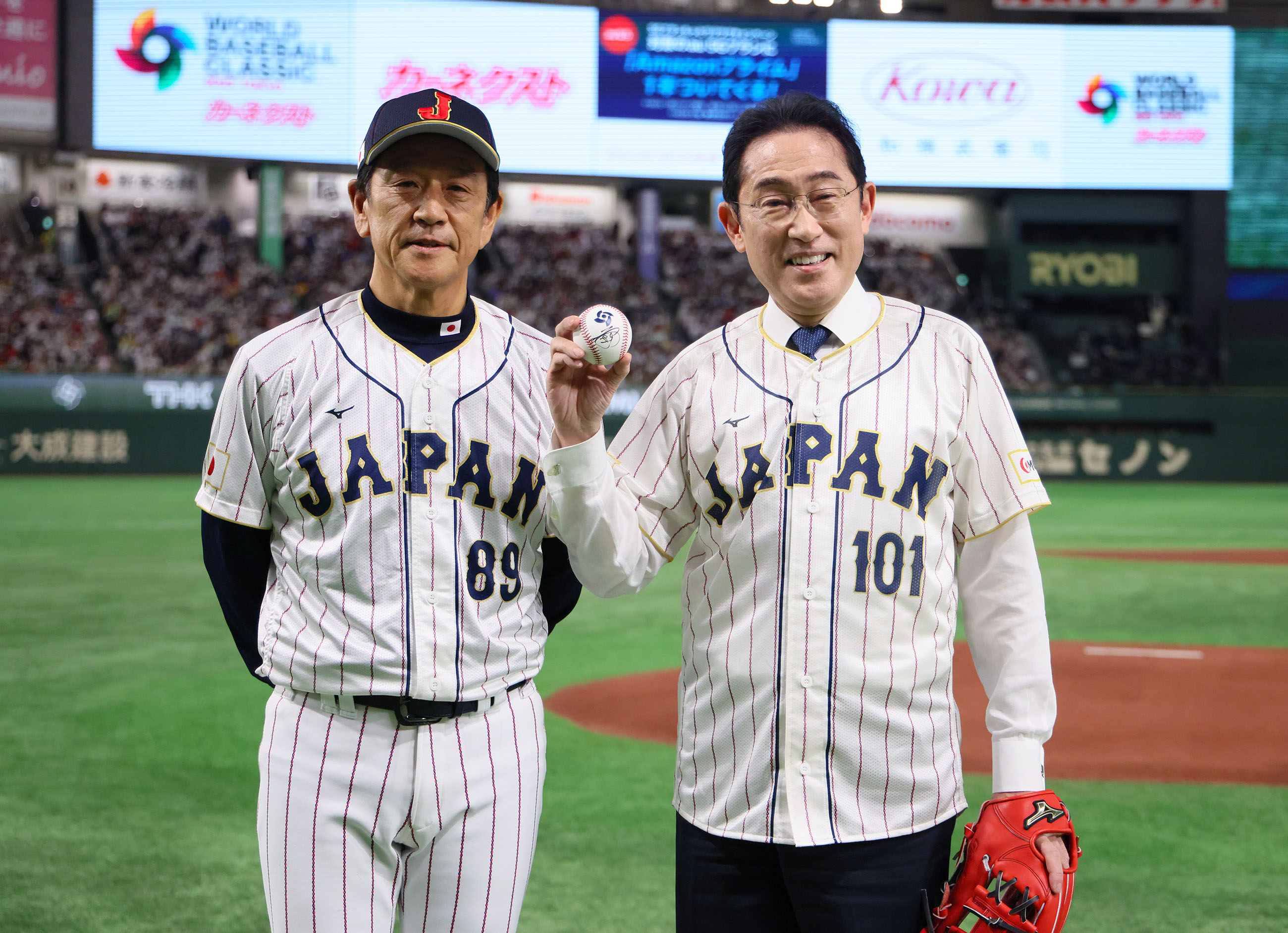
Team Japan manager Hideki Kuriyama meets with Prime Minister Fumio Kishida, who threw the ceremonial first pitch

March 10, 2023 19:00 PM JST at Tokyo Dome in Tokyo, Japan
Team	1	2	3	4	5	6	7	8	9	R	H	E
South Korea	0	0	3	0	0	1	0	0	0	4	6	1
Japan	0	0	4	0	2	5	2	0	X	13	13	1
WP: Yu Darvish (1–0) LP: Kwang-hyun Kim (0–1); Home runs: KOR: Yang Eui-ji (2), Park Kun-woo (1); JPN: Kensuke Kondo (1); Attendance: 41,629; Umpires: HP: Laz Díaz, 1B: Stu Scheurwater, 2B: Delfin Colon, 3B: Cuti Suárez; Boxscore

=== China vs Australia ===
March 11, 2023 12:00 PM JST at Tokyo Dome in Tokyo, Japan
Team	1	2	3	4	5	6	7	8	9	R	H	E
China	0	0	0	2	0	0	0	X	X	2	5	1
Australia	3	0	2	5	0	1	1	X	X	12	12	1
WP: Kyle Glogoski (1–0) LP: Xin Qi (0–1); Home runs: CHN: None; AUS: Robbie Glendinning (2); Attendance: 15,708; Umpires: HP – Adam Hamari, 1B – Chan-Jung Chang, 2B – Pat Hoberg, 3B – Delfin Colon; Notes: Completed early due to 10–run mercy rule after 7 innings. No outs when last run scored. Boxscore

=== Czech Republic vs Japan ===
March 11, 2023 19:00 PM JST at Tokyo Dome in Tokyo, Japan
Team	1	2	3	4	5	6	7	8	9	R	H	E
Czech Republic	1	0	0	0	1	0	0	0	0	2	4	1
Japan	0	0	3	4	1	0	0	2	X	10	11	1
WP: Rōki Sasaki (1–0) LP: Ondřej Satoria (0–1) Sv: Hiroya Miyagi (1); Home runs: CZE: None; JPN: Shugo Maki (2); Attendance: 41,637; Umpires: HP: Ben May, 1B: Ramon De Jesus, 2B: Cuti Suárez, 3B: Fabrizio Fabrizi; Boxscore

=== Czech Republic vs South Korea ===
March 12, 2023 12:00 PM JST at Tokyo Dome in Tokyo, Japan
Team	1	2	3	4	5	6	7	8	9	R	H	E
Czech Republic	0	0	0	0	0	0	2	1	0	3	6	1
South Korea	5	1	0	0	0	0	1	0	x	7	11	0
WP: Se Woong Park (1–0) LP: Lukas Ercoli (0–1) Sv: Yongchan Lee (1); Home runs: CZE: None; KOR: Ha-seong Kim 2 (2); Attendance: 16,129; Umpires: HP – Delfin Colon, 1B – Laz Diaz, 2B – Fabrizio Fabrizzi, 3B – Ben May; Boxscore

=== Japan vs Australia ===
March 12, 2023 19:00 PM JST at Tokyo Dome in Tokyo, Japan
Team	1	2	3	4	5	6	7	8	9	R	H	E
Japan	3	2	0	1	1	0	0	0	0	7	10	0
Australia	0	0	0	0	0	0	0	0	1	1	5	0
WP: Yoshinobu Yamamoto (1–0) LP: Will Sherriff (0–1); Home runs: JPN: Shohei Ohtani (1); AUS: Alex Hall (1); Attendance: 41,664; Umpires: HP – Pat Hoberg, 1B – Cuti Suárez, 2B – Adam Hamari, 3B – Chan-Jung Chang; Boxscore

=== Australia vs Czech Republic ===
March 13, 2023 12:00 PM JST at Tokyo Dome in Tokyo, Japan
Team	1	2	3	4	5	6	7	8	9	R	H	E
Australia	1	0	0	0	0	0	2	3	2	8	8	0
Czech Republic	0	0	1	0	0	0	0	2	0	3	8	0
WP: Daniel McGrath (1–0) LP: Marek Minařík (1–1); Home runs: AUS: Alex Hall (2); CZE: None; Attendance: 16,641; Umpires: HP – Ramon De Jesus, 1B – Delfin Colon, 2B: Laz Díaz, 3B – Fabrizio Fabrizi; Boxscore

=== South Korea vs China ===
This was China's worst defeat in the World Baseball Classic, with South Korea having scored 22 runs, the highest number of runs in any of the World Baseball Classic competition. China were also the first team to lose all four games.

March 13, 2023 19:00 PM JST at Tokyo Dome in Tokyo, Japan
Team	1	2	3	4	5	6	7	8	9	R	H	E
South Korea	2	2	8	6	4	x	x	x	x	22	20	0
China	2	0	0	0	0	x	x	x	x	2	4	0
WP: Hyeong Jun So (1–0) LP: Alan Carter (0–1); Home runs: KOR: Park Kun-woo (2), Ha-seong Kim (3); CHN: None; Attendance: 14,442; Umpires: HP – Stu Scheurwater, 1B – Adam Hamari, 2B – Chan-Jung Chang, 3B – Cuti Suarez; Boxscore

== Statistics ==
=== Leading hitters ===
==== Power ====
SLG	Team	1B	2B	3B	HR	AB
.542	South Korea	31	6	0	7	131
.515	Japan	27	11	1	4	132
.480	Australia	22	6	1	6	127
.293	Czech Republic	21	5	0	2	133
.236	China	13	4	0	1	106

==== Efficiency ====
OBP	Team	H	BB	HBP	AB	SF
.486	Japan	43	41	4	132	4
.425	South Korea	44	18	3	131	1
.376	Australia	35	17	4	127	1
.287	Czech Republic	28	11	4	133	2
.258	China	18	12	1	106	1

=== Leading pitchers ===
WHIP	Team	BB	H	IP	K
0.61	Japan	4	18	36	54
1.42	South Korea	11	33	31	41
1.44	Australia	19	30	34	34
1.74	Czech Republic	23	36	34	22
3.32	China	42	51	28	21
