= Yang Shunyi =

Chinese baseball player

Guangdong Leopards
- Outfielder
- Born: January 1, 1993 (age 33)
- Bats: Right Throws: Right

Yang Shunyi (born January 1, 1993) is a Chinese baseball outfielder who plays with the Guangdong Leopards in the China Baseball League.

Yang represented China at the 2014 Asian Games, 2015 Asian Baseball Championship, 2017 World Baseball Classic and 2018 Asian Games.
