= Lu Yusong =

Chinese baseball player

Henan Elephants
- Pitcher
- Born: February 6, 1992 (age 34)
- Bats: Right Throws: Right

Lu Yusong (born February 6, 1992) is a Chinese baseball pitcher who plays with the Henan Elephants in the China Baseball League.

Lu represented China at the 2017 World Baseball Classic and 2018 Asian Games.
