= Park Chi-guk =

South Korean baseball player (born 1998)

Doosan Bears – No. 1
- Pitcher
- Born: March 10, 1998 (age 27); Incheon, South Korea
- Bats: Right Throws: Right

KBO debut
- April 27, 2017, for the Doosan Bears

KBO statistics (through 2025 season)
- Win–loss record: 22–25
- Earned run average: 4.25
- Strikeouts: 356

Teams
- Doosan Bears (2017–present)

Park Chi-guk (Korean: 박치국; born March 10, 1998) is a South Korean professional baseball pitcher who is currently playing for the Doosan Bears of the KBO League.

He is a sidearm pitcher. He graduated from Jemulpo High School (제물포고등학교; 濟物浦高等學校) and was selected to Doosan Bears by a draft in 2017.(2nd draft, 1st round)

He represented South Korea at the 2018 Asian Games.

== Pitching style ==
Park throws most of his pitch four-seam fastball that averages 87 mph. He also throws 78 mph slider, 75 mph curveball, and 79 mph changeup 10% each.
