= Park Min-woo =

Park Min-woo is the name of:

- Park Min-woo (actor) (born 1988), South Korean actor
- Park Min-woo (baseball) (born 1993), South Korean baseball player
