= Hosoyamada =

Hosoyamada (written: 細山田) is a Japanese surname. Notable people with the surname include:

- Akane Hosoyamada (細山田 茜, born 1992), Japanese ice hockey player
- Takeshi Hosoyamada (細山田 武史, born 1986), Japanese baseball player
