= Yang Yanyong =

Chinese baseball player

Shanghai Golden Eagles
- Outfielder / Pitcher
- Born: May 5, 1994 (age 32)
- Bats: Left Throws: Right

Yang Yanyong (born May 5, 1994) is a Chinese baseball outfielder and pitcher who plays with the Shanghai Golden Eagles in the China Baseball League and represented China at the 2013 World Baseball Classic, 2017 World Baseball Classic and 2018 Asian Games.
