= Zheng Chaoqun =

Chinese baseball player

Jiangsu Pegasus
- Pitcher
- Born: February 9, 1993 (age 33)
- Bats: Right Throws: Right

Zheng Chaoqun (born February 9, 1993) is a Chinese baseball pitcher who plays with the Jiangsu Pegasus in the China National Baseball League.

Zheng represented China at the 2015 Asian Baseball Championship, 2017 World Baseball Classic and 2018 Asian Games.
