= Li Ning (baseball) =

Chinese baseball player (born 1994)

Shanghai Dragons – No. 9
- Catcher
- Born: November 12, 1994 (age 31); China
- Bats: Left Throws: Right

Li Ning (Chinese: 李宁; pinyin: Lǐ Níng; born November 12, 1994) is a Chinese baseball catcher who plays with the Shanghai Dragons of Chinese Professional Baseball. He previously played with the Shanghai Golden Eagles in the China Baseball League.

== Career ==
Li represented China at the 2015 Asian Baseball Championship, 2017 World Baseball Classic and 2018 Asian Games.
