= Kim Min-sik =

Kim Min-sik may refer to:

- Kim Min-sik (footballer)
- Kim Min-sik (baseball)
- Kim Min-sik (actor)
