= Jang Pill-joon =

South Korean baseball player (born 1988)

- Relief pitcher
- Born: April 8, 1988 (age 38); Daewoo, South Korea
- Batted: Left Threw: Right

KBO debut
- August 30, 2015, for the Samsung Lions

Last KBO appearance
- March 24, 2024, for the Samsung Lions

KBO statistics
- Win–loss record: 17–29
- Earned run average: 5.29
- Strikeouts: 348
- Saves: 42
- Stats at Baseball Reference

Teams
- Samsung Lions (2015–2024)

- Jang Pill-joon
- Hangul: 장필준
- Hanja: 張必峻
- RR: Jang Piljun
- MR: Chang P'ilchun

Jang Pill-joon (Korean: 장필준; born April 8, 1988) is a South Korean former relief pitcher for the Samsung Lions of the KBO League. He throws right-handed and bats left-handed.

== Professional career ==
=== Los Angeles Angels ===
On December 5, 2008, Jang signed with the Los Angeles Angels organization as an international free agent. He spent his first professional season in 2009 with the rookie-level Arizona League Angels, posting a 6-3 record and 3.83 ERA with 72 strikeouts across 14 starts.

Jang split the 2010 season between the rookie-level Orem Owlz and the High-A Rancho Cucamonga Quakes. In 17 starts for the two affiliates, he accumulated a 3-3 record and 3.81 ERA with 48 strikeouts over 85 innings of work. Jang spent the 2011 campaign with Orem and the Single-A Cedar Rapids Kernels, posting a cumulative 3-6 record and 4.69 ERA with 48 strikeouts in 80 2/3 innings pitched across 15 starts.

Jang was released by the Angels organization prior to the start of the season on March 25, 2012.

=== Las Cruces Vaqueros ===
Jang spent the 2012 campaign with the Las Cruces Vaqueros of the Pecos League of Professional Baseball Clubs. In 3 games (2 starts) for the club, Jang struggled to a 1-1 record and 12.00 ERA with 8 strikeouts over 12 innings of work.

=== Samsung Lions ===
Jang joined the Samsung Lions of the KBO League in 2015, making two appearances for the team. Jang made 56 appearances for the Lions during the 2016 campaign, Jang compiled a 4-6 record and 5.13 ERA with 57 strikeouts over 72 innings of work.

Jang was promoted to the closer role in 2017, making 56 relief appearances for the team, in which he compiled a 4-8 record and 4.68 ERA with 82 strikeouts and 21 saves across 67 1/3 innings pitched. He made 61 appearances for Samsung during the 2018 season, registering a 5-5 record and 4.34 ERA with 74 strikeouts and 6 saves across 66 1/3 innings pitched.

== International career ==
He was selected to represent South Korea at the 2017 Asia Professional Baseball Championship, and picked up a save against Chinese Taipei

In 2018, he represented South Korea at the 2018 Asian Games.
