= Gan Quan =

Chinese baseball player

Sichuan Dragons
- Pitcher
- Born: June 17, 1996 (age 30)
- Bats: Right Throws: Right

Gan Quan (甘泉; born June 17, 1996) is a Chinese baseball pitcher who plays with the Sichuan Dragons in the China Baseball League. He currently plays with the Texas AirHogs of the American Association.

Gan represented China at the 2017 World Baseball Classic and 2018 Asian Games.
