= Submarine (baseball) =

Type of pitch in baseball

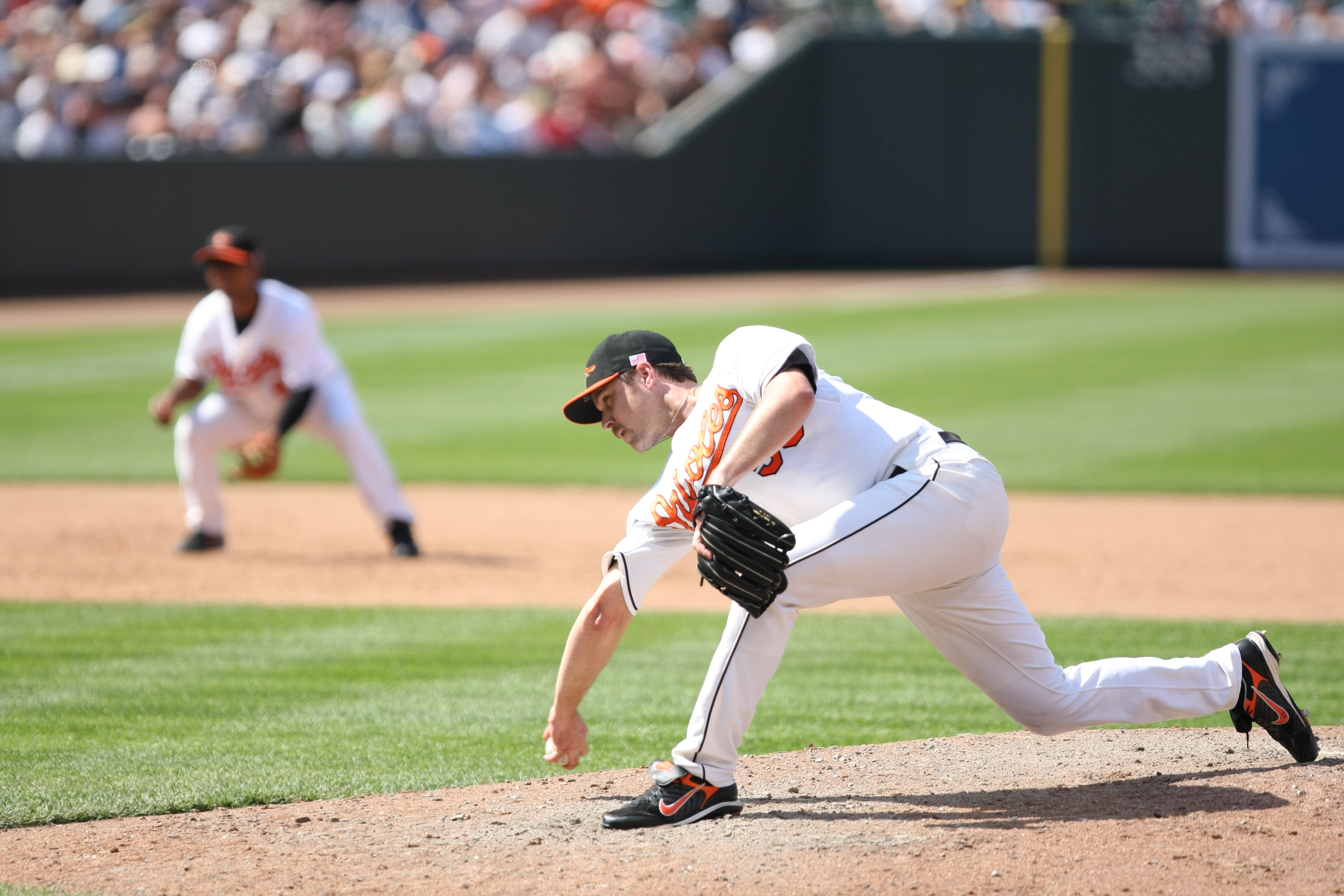
Chad Bradford delivers a pitch with a submarine motion.

In baseball, a submarine is a pitching delivery in which the ball is released often just above the ground, but not underhanded, with the torso bent at a right angle, and shoulders tilted so severely that they rotate around a nearly horizontal axis. This is in stark contrast to the underhand softball pitch in which the torso remains upright, the shoulders are level, and the hips do not rotate.

== Description ==
The "upside down" release of the submariner causes balls to move differently from pitches generated by other arm slots. Gravity plays a significant role, for the submariner's ball must be thrown considerably above the strike zone, after which it drops rapidly back through. The sinking motion of the submariner's fastball is enhanced by forward rotation, in contrast with the overhand pitcher's hopping backspin.

Submarine pitches are often the toughest for same-side batters to hit (i.e., a right-handed submarine pitcher is the more difficult for a right-handed batter to hit, and likewise for left-handed pitchers and batters). This is because the submariner's spin is not perfectly level; the ball rotates forward and toward the pitching arm side, jamming same-sided hitters at the last moment, even as the ball drops rapidly through the zone.

Though the bending motion required to pitch effectively as a submariner means that submariners may be more at risk of developing back problems, it is commonly thought that the submarine motion is less injurious to the elbow and shoulder. Kent Tekulve and Gene Garber, two former submarine pitchers, were among the most durable pitchers in baseball history with 1,944 appearances between the two.

Past major league submariners include Carl Mays, Ted Abernathy, Elden Auker, Chad Bradford, Mark Eichhorn, Kent Tekulve, Todd Frohwirth, and Dan Quisenberry. Steve Olin was also a submarine pitcher.

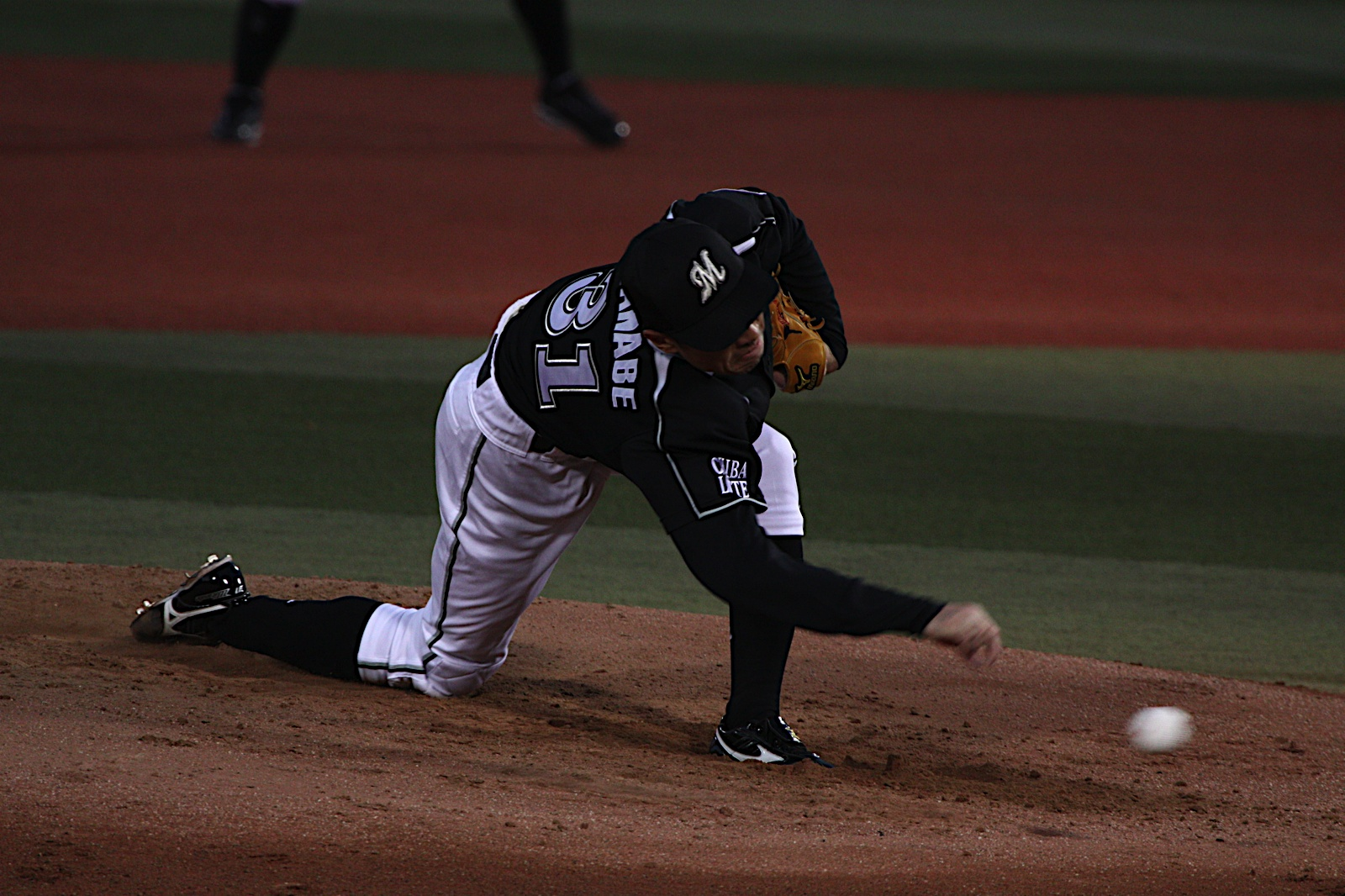
Shunsuke Watanabe

Japanese pitcher Shunsuke Watanabe is known as "Mr. Submarine" in Japan. Watanabe has an even lower release point than the typical submarine pitcher, dropping his pivot knee so low that it scrapes the ground. He now wears a pad under his uniform to avoid injuring his knee. His release is so low that his knuckles often become raw from their periodic drag on the ground.

== Submarine pitchers ==
=== Current players ===
==== Major League Baseball ====
- Tyler Rogers
- Ryan Thompson
- Tim Hill

==== Nippon Professional Baseball ====
- Rei Takahashi
- Kaito Yoza

==== KBO League ====
- Park Jong-hoon

=== Former players ===
- Ted Abernathy
- Elden Auker
- Chad Bradford
- Tae-Hyon Chong
- Adam Cimber
- Mark Eichhorn
- Todd Frohwirth
- Dick Hyde
- Byung-hyun Kim
- Dae-woo Kim
- Terry Leach
- Liao Yu-cheng
- Lin Chen-hua
- Bob Long
- Kazuhisa Makita
- Carl Mays
- Porter Moss
- Mike Myers
- Darren O'Day
- Steve Olin
- Dan Quisenberry
- Gus Schlosser
- Joe Smith
- Kent Tekulve
- Jack Warhop
- Shunsuke Watanabe
- Kelly Wunsch
- Hisashi Yamada
- Hirofumi Yamanaka
- Eric Yardley
- Brad Ziegler

== See also ==
- Sidearm
