= Im Gi-yeong =

South Korean baseball player (born 1993)

Samsung Lions – No. 38
- Pitcher
- Born: April 16, 1993 (age 33); Daegu, South Korea
- Bats: Right Throws: Right

KBO debut
- October 1, 2012, for the Hanwha Eagles

KBO statistics (through March 29, 2024)
- Win–loss record: 52–60
- Earned run average: 4.88
- Strikeouts: 640
- Stats at Baseball Reference

Teams
- Hanwha Eagles (2012–2014); Kia Tigers (2017–2025); Samsung Lions (2026–present)

Career highlights and awards
- Korean Series champion (2026)

- Im Gi-yeong
- Hangul: 임기영
- Hanja: 林起映
- RR: Im Giyeong
- MR: Im Kiyŏng

Im Gi-yeong (Korean: 임기영; born April 16, 1993) is a South Korean professional baseball pitcher currently playing for the Samsung Lions of the KBO League.

He is a sidearm pitcher who relies primarily on his changeup, complimented by a fastball and slider. Although sidearm pitchers are often less effective against left-handed batters, his changeup has helped mitigate that disadvantage and enabled him to remain a starting pitcher.

Based on his outstanding control, he shows a high first-ball strike ratio, which leads to an advantageous fight with the batter. Even if he hits a hit or a home run, he can throw a strike on the first pitch to the next batter, which is also an advantage. Fastball speed was in the mid 130 km/h range as a sidearm, showing up to 146 km/h, but it was a record when he briefly raised his octagonal angle during Hanwha's time, and 144 km/h was the maximum speed in KIA after being discharged from the military.

The decisive ball as a pitcher is definitely a changeup, coming from the same release point as a fastball, and even if the batter is waiting for the timing, it falls more than 35 cm outside based on the left-handed batter to induce a swing. On some days, the percentage of pitches is so significant that the batting average is higher than the fastball, and he often throws not only to the left but also to the right, contributing to making batters in trouble. Of course, the day when Lim Ki-young is robbed is when the power of the changeup decreases. This article shows that the drop in the changeup has decreased significantly in the second half of 2017, when the balance has collapsed since pneumonia, compared to the first half of 2017.

The slider thrown with a third pitch is not bad, so I tend to eat it well against right-handed batters. The rest of the curves, sinkers, and forkballs are also available, but they show that they can throw them. Meanwhile, at the start of the 2020 season, he began to mix and throw two-seam.

In the 2018 season, the changeup, a symbolic pitch, was not the appearance of the 2017 season at all, so he could hardly do its part. Then, at the end of the 2019 season, the change-up of 2017 began to be seen to some extent.

In the 2020 season, he succeeded in entering the starting lineup again as the change-up momentum continued at the end of 2019. The number of balls is not so small, but there are times when the number of pitches increases, but he is playing as the league's top 4 and 5 starters as his ball sambi and walks per 9 innings have improved noticeably. And as the average speed rose in the 2021 season and the change-up perfectly revived, he was able to lead and overwhelm batters with more swings.

== International career ==
In 2017, Im was selected to represent South Korea at the 2017 Asia Professional Baseball Championship. He pitched 7 innings of no-run ball against Chinese Taipei on November 17, 2107.

In 2018, Im represented South Korea at the 2018 Asian Games.
