= Kim Min-sik (baseball) =

South Korean baseball player (born 1989)

- Catcher
- Born: June 28, 1989 (age 37)
- Bats: Left Throws: Right

KBO debut
- April 30, 2015, for the SK Wyverns

KBO statistics (through 2025)
- Batting average: .226
- Home runs: 25
- Runs batted in: 224
- Stats at Baseball Reference

Teams
- SK Wyverns (2015–2017); Kia Tigers (2017–2022); SSG Landers (2022–2026)

Kim Min-sik (Korean: 김민식; born June 28, 1989, in Changwon) is a catcher who plays for the SSG Landers in the Korea Baseball Organization. He bats left-handed and throws right-handed.

== Amateur career ==
In July 2010, as a junior at Wonkwang University, Kim got his first call-up to the South Korea national baseball team and competed in the team's five friendly baseball matches against the USA national baseball team in North Carolina, as a starting catcher. He hit a RBI double off Red Sox' first round draft pick Brian Johnson in Game 2 and two doubles off future Major League relievers Noe Ramirez and Sean Gilmartin in Game 5 but struggled at the plate during the series, going 3-for-17.

=== Notable international careers ===
| Year | Venue | Competition | Team | Individual note |
|---|---|---|---|---|
| 2010 | United States | South Korea vs USA Baseball Championship | 0W-5L | .176 BA (3-for-17), 2 RBI, 1 R |
| 2010 | Chinese Taipei | Intercontinental Cup | 6th | .400 BA (2-for-5), 1 BB, 1 SB |

== Professional career ==
The SK Wyverns selected him in the second round of the 2012 KBO draft. However, Kim didn't play any first league game for three years due to military duty.

Kim made his first league debut in 2015 but mostly served as a backup catcher to Lee Jae-won from 2015 through 2016 for the Wyverns.

Kim was traded to the Kia Tigers in the beginning of the 2017 season, and subsequently became the starting catcher for the Tigers.
