= Jae-gyun Hwang =

South Korean baseball player (born 1987)

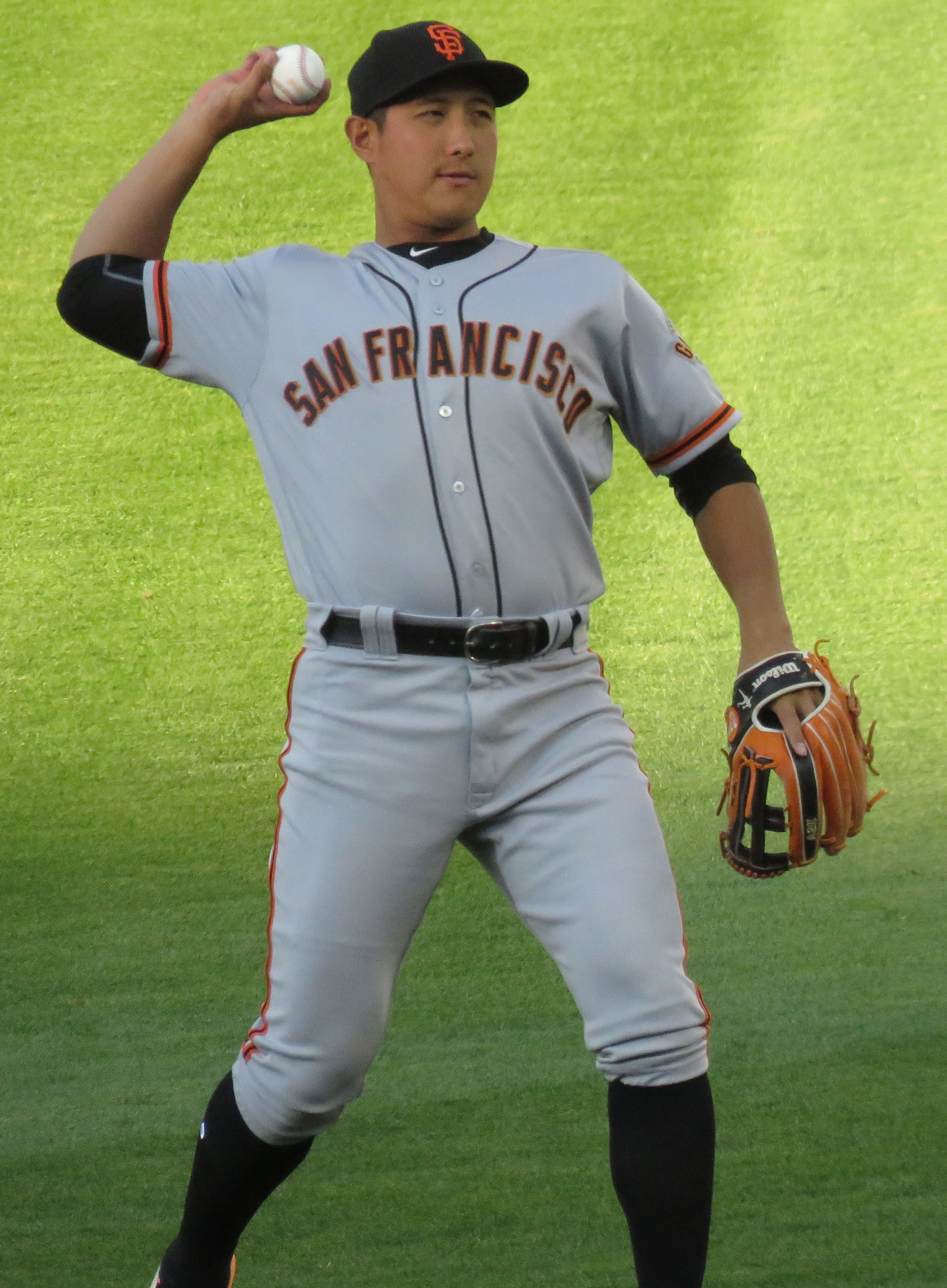
- Hwang with the San Francisco Giants in 2017
- Third baseman
- Born: July 28, 1987 (age 39); Seoul, South Korea
- Batted: Right Threw: Right

Professional debut
- KBO: April 21, 2007, for the Hyundai Unicorns
- MLB: June 28, 2017, for the San Francisco Giants

Last appearance
- KBO: October 3, 2025, for the KT Wiz
- MLB: August 1, 2017, for the San Francisco Giants

KBO statistics
- Batting average: .285
- Home runs: 227
- Runs batted in: 1,121

MLB statistics
- Batting average: .154
- Home runs: 1
- Runs batted in: 5
- Stats at Baseball Reference

Teams
- Hyundai Unicorns (2007); Woori / Nexen Heroes (2008–2010); Lotte Giants (2010–2016); San Francisco Giants (2017); KT Wiz (2018–2025)

Career highlights and awards
- KBO: Korean Series champion (2021); KBO Golden Glove Award (2020); International: WBSC Premier12 All-World Team (2015)
Medals
Representing South Korea
2015 WBSC Premier12
Gold medal – first place	2015 Tokyo	Team

- Jae-gyun Hwang
- Hangul: 황재균
- Hanja: 黃載均
- RR: Hwang Jaegyun
- MR: Hwang Chaegyun

Jae-gyun Hwang (Korean: 황재균; Hanja: 黃載均; born July 28, 1987) is a South Korean former professional baseball infielder. He played in the KBO League for the Hyundai Unicorns, Nexen Heroes, Lotte Giants, and KT Wiz, and in Major League Baseball (MLB) for the San Francisco Giants.

== Career ==
=== Hyundai Unicorns/Nexen Heroes ===
Hwang made his KBO League debut in Hyundai Unicorns in 2007. The team folded after his rookie season, and became the Nexen Heroes, for whom he played from 2008 to 2010.

=== Lotte Giants ===
The Heroes traded Hwang to the Lotte Giants from 2010, and he continued to play for the Giants through the 2016 season. Hwang attracted international attention for a bat flip in July 2015, after he hit a game-tying home run in the ninth inning against the NC Dinos.

In October 2015, Hwang announced that he had asked the Giants to post him for transfer to Major League Baseball (MLB) in the United States. His teammate, Ah-seop Son, also asked to be posted. No MLB team placed a bid for Hwang.

=== San Francisco Giants ===
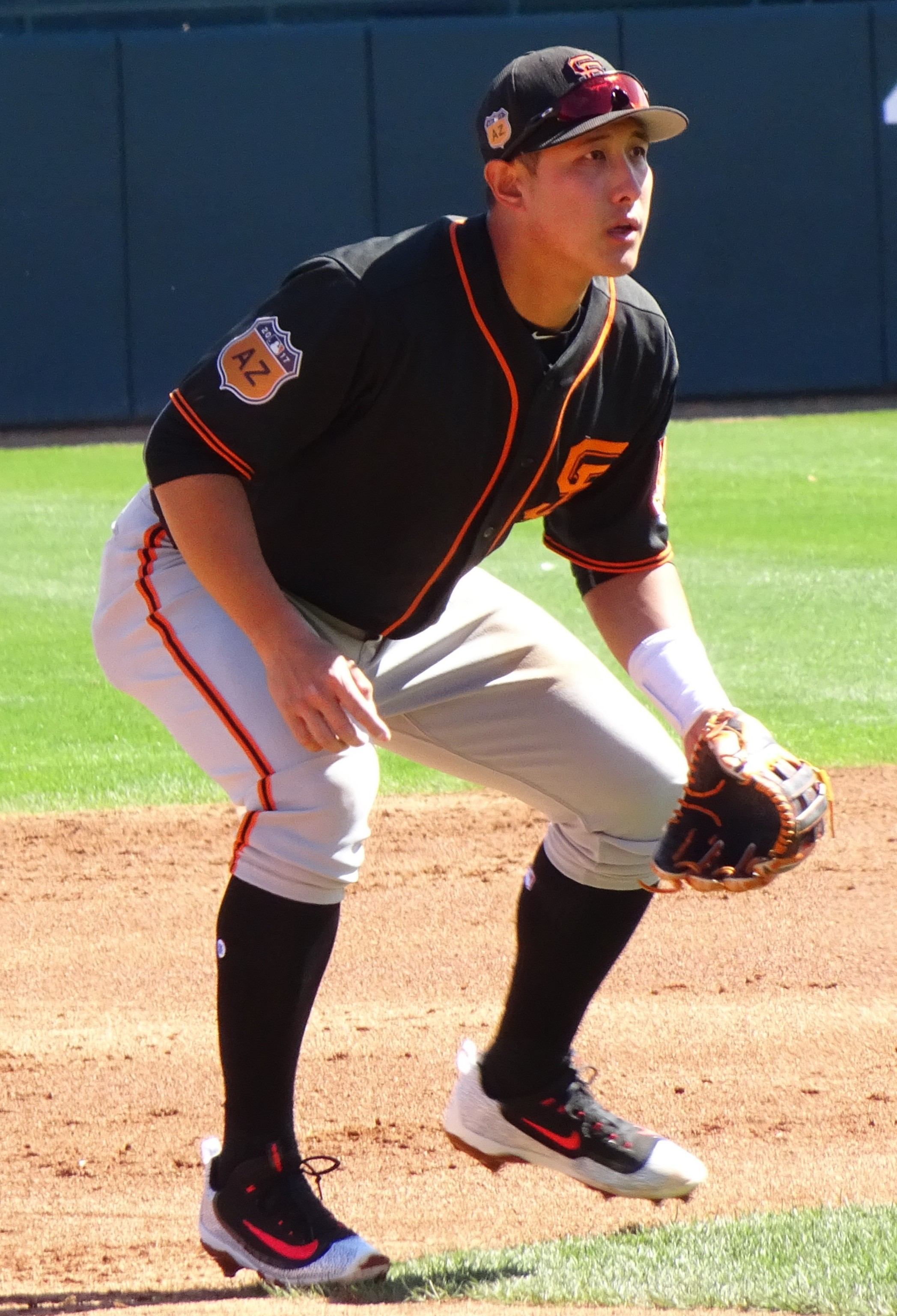
Hwang during his tenure with the San Francisco Giants in 2017 Spring Training

After becoming a free agent after the 2016 season, Hwang sought a contract with an MLB franchise. On January 23, 2017, the San Francisco Giants announced they had signed Hwang to a minor league contract with an invitation to spring training for a chance to make the major league roster. Hwang began the season with the Sacramento River Cats of the Triple-A Pacific Coast League on April 8, 2017. In late June, Hwang told the Giants that he would use the opt-out clause in his contract and become a free agent if he was not called up to the major leagues by July 1. He had batted .287 with seven home runs and 44 RBI, splitting his time between third and first base, before the Giants promoted Hwang to the major leagues. Hwang debuted for the Giants at third base on June 28. He picked up his first hit, a solo home run, on the same day. On August 31, Hwang was designated for assignment by the Giants and was sent outright to the Sacramento River Cats, the Giants' Triple-A affiliate. He elected free agency following the season on November 6.

=== KT Wiz ===
On November 12, 2017, Hwang signed a four-year, $7.9 million contract with the KT Wiz. Cho Moo-geun was named as his reward player. On December 27, 2021, Hwang re-signed with the Wiz on a four-year, $5.1 million contract.

Hwang made 112 appearances for the Wiz in 2025, slashing .275/.336/.379 with seven home runs, 48 RBI, and three stolen bases. On December 19, 2025, Hwang announced his retirement from professional baseball.

=== Entertainment ===
On February 12, 2026, Hwang signed an exclusive contract with SM Culture & Contents. He is set to appear in the Disney+ survival show, Deadly Tag.

== Personal life ==
On February 10, 2022, Hwang announced in a handwritten letter via personal SNS that he and singer-actress Park Ji-yeon, will get married in the winter of this year. They married in a private ceremony on December 10 at Shilla Hotel. The ceremony was attended by the couple's closest family and friends, and IU sang the congratulatory song. On October 5, 2024, it was officially announced that after nearly two years of marriage, they had separated and mutually agreed to divorce.

== International career ==
He represented South Korea at the 2014 Asian Games, 2015 WBSC Premier12 and 2018 Asian Games.

Year	Venue	Competition	Team	Individual Note
2014	South Korea	Incheon Asian Games	Gold medal	
2018	South Korea	Jakarta-Palembang Asian Games	Gold medal	

== Television appearances ==
- 2021, King of Mask Singer (MBC): Contestant as "Mr. Bean" (episode 289)

== See also ==
- List of KBO career home run leaders
- List of KBO career RBI leaders
- List of KBO career hits leaders
