= Ham Deok-ju =

South Korean baseball player (born 1995)

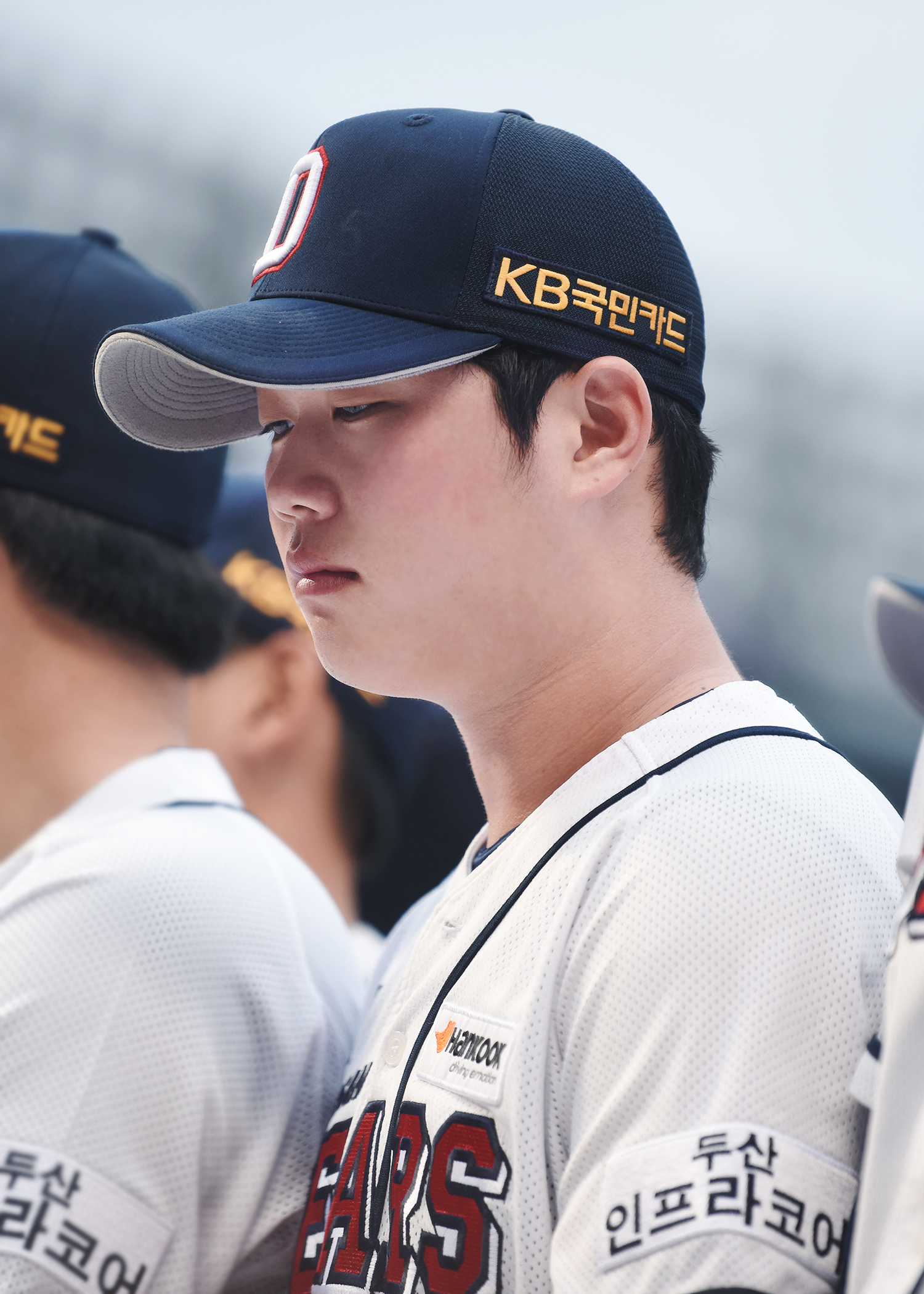
- Pitcher
- Born: 13 January 1995 (age 31)
- Bats: Left Throws: Left

KBO debut
- 2013, for the Doosan Bears

KBO statistics (through 2025 season)
- Win–loss record: 37–25
- Earned run average: 3.66
- Strikeouts: 549
- Stats at Baseball Reference

Teams
- Doosan Bears (2013–2021); LG Twins (2021–2026)

Ham Deok-ju (Korean: 함덕주; Hanja: 咸德柱; born 13 January 1995), also known as Deok Ju Ham, is a South Korean professional baseball pitcher.

He graduated from Wonju High School and was selected to Doosan Bears by a draft in 2013 (2nd draft, 5th round). In 2018, he changed back number from No.61 to No.1. He achieved his personal best of nine wins in 2017 season.

He represented South Korea at the 2018 Asian Games.
