= Jung Woo-ram =

South Korean baseball player

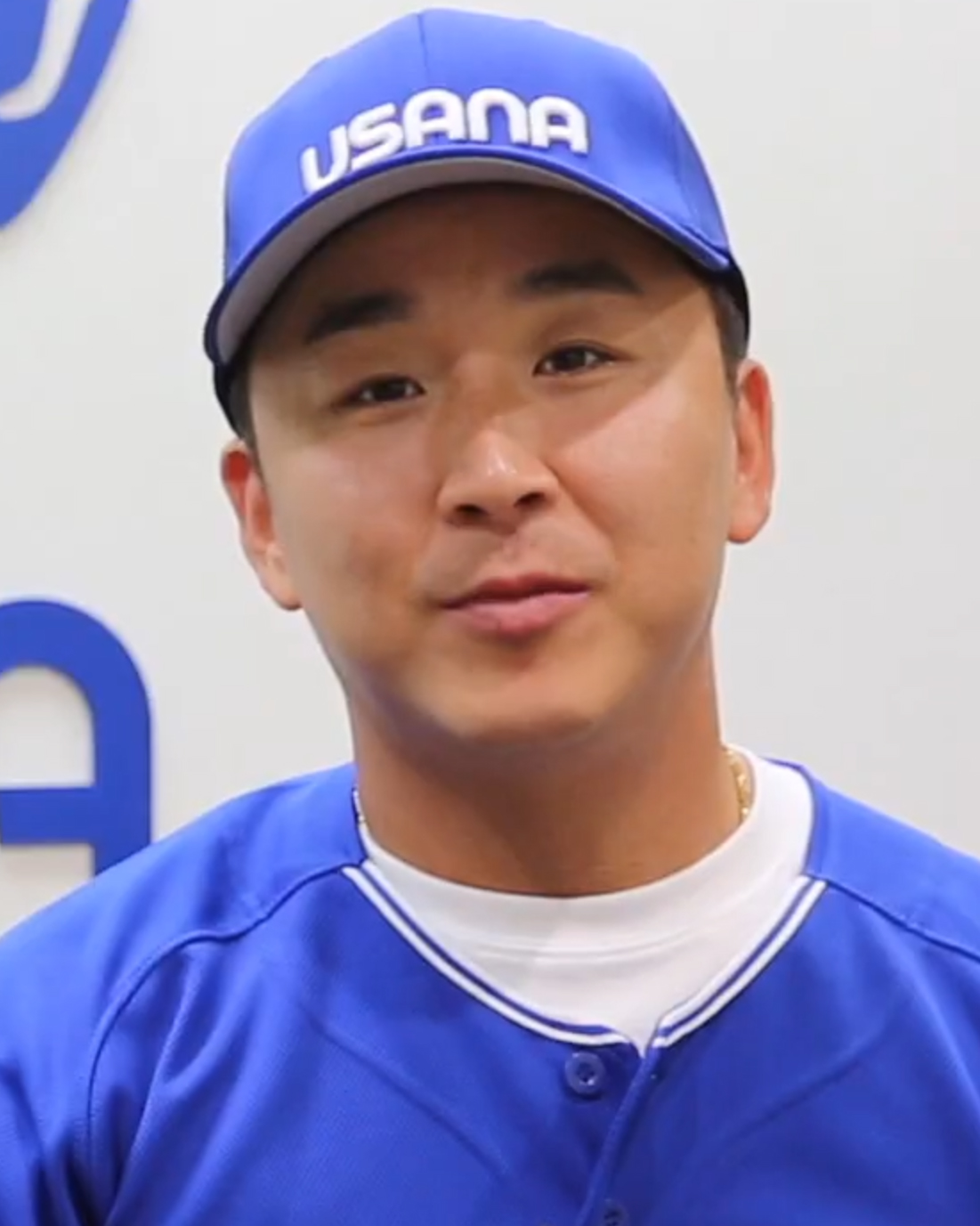
- Jung in 2019

Hanwha Eagles – No. 92
- Second squad bullpen coach
- Born: June 1, 1985 (age 40); Busan, South Korea
- Batted: Left Threw: Left

KBO debut
- April 23, 2004, for the SK Wyverns

Last KBO appearance
- September 29, 2024, for the Hanwha Eagles

KBO statistics
- Win–loss record: 64–47
- Earned run average: 3.18
- Strikeouts: 937
- Holds: 145
- Saves: 197
- Stats at Baseball Reference

Teams
- As player: SK Wyverns (2004–2012, 2015); Hanwha Eagles (2016–2024); As coach: Hanwha Eagles (2025–present)

Career highlights and awards
- KBO saves leader (2018)
Medals
Men's baseball
Representing South Korea
2015 WBSC Premier12
Gold medal – first place	2015 Tokyo	Team

- Jung Woo-ram
- Hangul: 정우람
- RR: Jeong Uram
- MR: Chŏng Uram

Jung Woo-ram (Korean: 정우람; born June 1, 1985) is a South Korean professional baseball pitcher for the Hanwha Eagles of the KBO League.

He represented South Korea at the 2018 Asian Games.

After the 2019 season, he became a free agent and stayed at 3.9 billion won in total for four years.
