= Park Jong-hun (baseball) =

South Korean baseball player

SSG Landers – No. 50
- Pitcher
- Born: August 13, 1991 (age 34); Gunsan, North Jeolla, South Korea
- Bats: Right Throws: Right

KBO debut
- July 12, 2011, for the SK Wyverns

KBO statistics (through June 2, 2024)
- Win–loss record: 72–76
- Earned run average: 4.81
- Strikeouts: 867
- Stats at Baseball Reference

Teams
- SK Wyverns / SSG Landers (2011–present)

- Park Jong-hun
- Hangul: 박종훈
- Hanja: 朴鐘勳
- RR: Bak Jonghun
- MR: Pak Chonghun

Park Jong-hun (born August 13, 1991) is a South Korean professional baseball pitcher for the SSG Landers of the KBO League.

He is known for his submarine pitch style.

He represented South Korea at the 2018 Asian Games and the WSBC Premier12.

He is on the roster for the South Korea Olympics Team 2020
