= Sidearm (baseball) =

Baseball pitch

In baseball, sidearm is a pitching delivery where a ball is pitched along a low, approximately horizontal plane rather than a high, mostly vertical plane (overhand).

Sidearm is a common way of throwing the ball in the infield, because many throws must be made hurriedly from the glove after fielding ground balls. An infielder's quickest throw to the bases is often from just above ground level, necessitating a horizontal release of the ball.

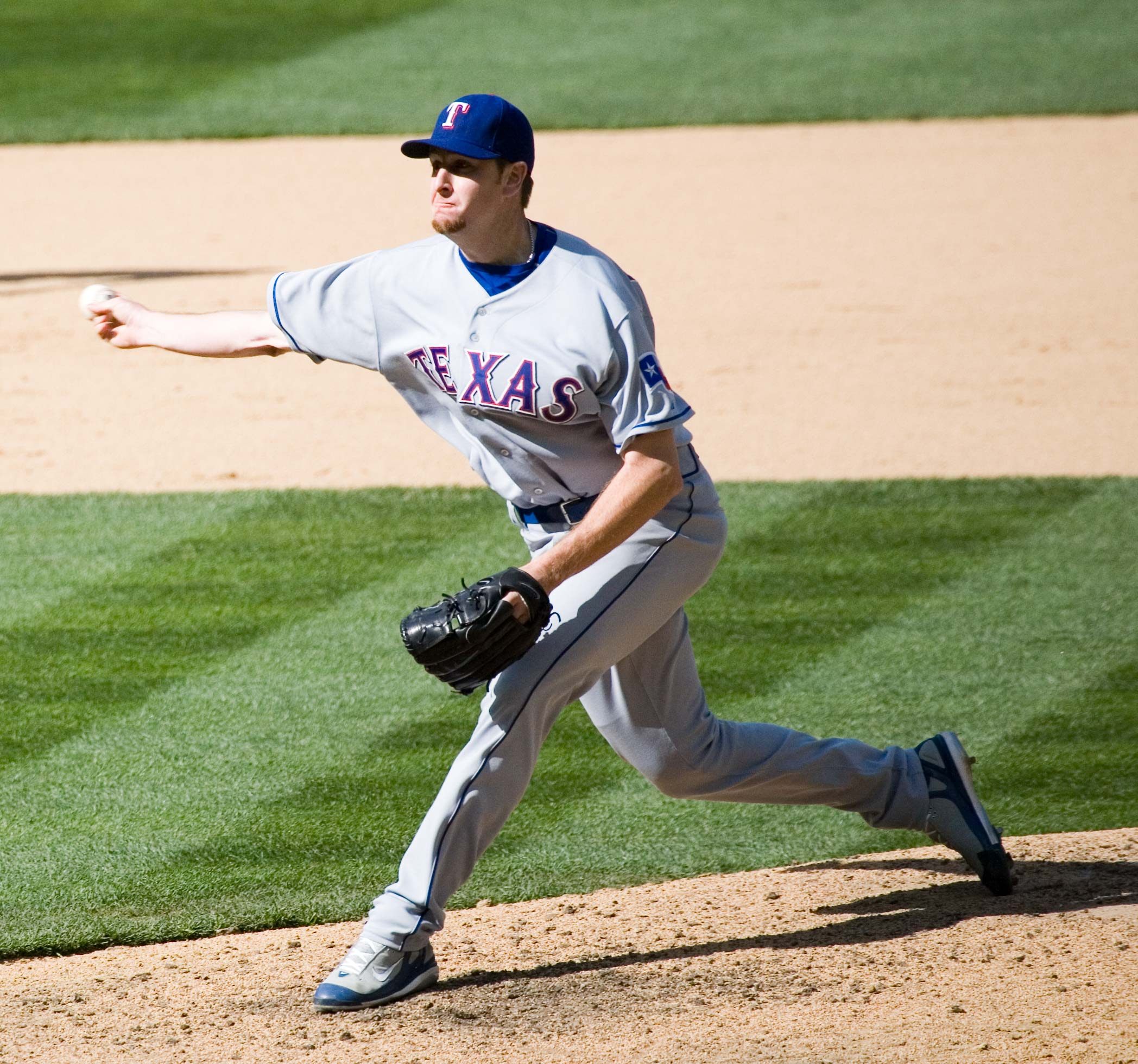
Scott Feldman throws a sidearm pitch.

Sidearm pitchers, also known as sidewinders, are uncommon at all levels of baseball except in Japan, where sidearm pitchers are widely popular. Few find sidearm a natural delivery, and those who do are often discouraged by coaches who know little about sidearm mechanics, and who believe that overhand pitching affords greater velocity. This is generally true, since overhand pitching provides better mechanical leverage with which the body can use to accelerate the ball. But what the sidearm pitcher loses in velocity, they gain in ball movement and unusual release point.

== Historical progression of pitching ==
In the middle of the nineteenth century, the game of baseball began to evolve from a sport played by amateurs for recreation into a more serious game played by professionals. One of the most dramatic changes was the transition of the pitcher's delivery from an underhand motion to an overhanded throw. Before the American Civil War, the pitcher's role was to initiate the action by offering an underhanded throw to the batter, in much the same way that a basketball referee offers up a jump ball to begin play. As the game progressed towards professionalism and became more serious, pitchers began to attempt to prevent the batter from hitting the ball by throwing faster pitches. The rules governing the delivery of pitches proved to be hard to enforce, and pitchers continued to stretch the boundaries of the rules until by the 1870s, the release point of pitches had reached the pitcher's waist level. As the game continued to evolve into the 20th century, pitchers' release points continued to rise to present day levels, although some adherents continued to use the sidearm delivery.

== Ball movement ==
The various spins pitchers commonly employ—fastballs, curveballs, sliders, cutters—cause the ball to diverge from a "normal" trajectory. This is caused by the Magnus effect, which makes the ball move in the direction of its rotation. Batters learn these spins and their likely trajectories, but predominantly from high-axis pitchers whose pitches rotate around a mostly horizontal axis. Sidearm pitches rotate similarly, but around an approximately vertical axis. This causes common pitches to behave very uncommonly. For example, the four-seam fastball, when thrown by overhand power pitchers, seems to "hop", or rise on its way to the plate. This is because the ball is rotating backwards, lowering the air pressure above the ball. The same pitch thrown by the sidearm pitcher causes a horizontal rotation, and consequent sideways movement. Sidearm pitchers whose deliveries are below the horizontal throw a fastball that rotates nearly forward, so the ball will sink rather than rise.

== Release point ==
Sidewinders' unusual release points make it difficult for the batter to "see" the ball because hitters are so accustomed to seeing the release from near the pitcher's head. Further, because the ball is released from alongside the rubber (and some sidearm pitchers step a little toward their pitching arm side when they deliver the ball) it can appear to a same-side batter that the ball has been thrown at him.

These characteristics have typecast today's sidearm pitchers as relievers, entering the game in the late innings as a "different look" from overhand pitchers. Though this is an effective strategy, some of the greatest starting pitchers in baseball history, notably Walter Johnson, Satchel Paige, Don Drysdale, Carl Mays, Dizzy Dean, and Randy Johnson, threw the ball sidearm.

Other prominent major leaguer sidewinders include, or have included, Madison Bumgarner, Chris Sale, Jimmy Herget, Edwin Díaz, Alexis Díaz, Hoby Milner, Alex Claudio, Nick Sandlin, Sean Manaea, Scott Feldman, Pat Neshek, Scott Sauerbeck, Dennis Eckersley, Mark Eichhorn, Javier López, Jake Peavy, Vinnie Pestano, Ted Abernathy, Gene Garber, Dave Baldwin, Bob Locker, and Kent Tekulve. Still others such as Jered Weaver, Bronson Arroyo, David Cone, and Tom Henke would sometimes "drop down" to a sidearm delivery to fool a batter for a strikeout.

It is most common to hear that sidearm pitching places less stress on the elbow and shoulder, thus reducing a pitcher's risk of injury. It is also not uncommon to hear the opposite. Analyses of pitchers' deliveries shows that arms slots are a function of shoulder tilt, not elbow angle, and this suggests that no one arm slot poses a greater threat to the elbow than another. It is likely, however, that pitchers who throw overhand are more susceptible to hyperabduction and concomitant rotator cuff problems, because they more easily throw the ball with the elbow higher than the level of the shoulders.

Releasing the ball even lower is known as a submarine pitch.

== In American football ==
Sidearm throwing is uncommon amongst quarterbacks in the NFL as it may not have enough arc to throw over the defenders, but relies on strong and quick wrist movements to generate power and throwing under and around blitzing defensive linemen and linebackers. Rich Gannon, Michael Vick, Philip Rivers, Aaron Rodgers, Matthew Stafford, Patrick Mahomes and Lamar Jackson are notable sidearm quarterbacks.

== See also ==
- Submarine (baseball)
- Roundarm bowling, the cricket equivalent
