= Park Min-woo (baseball) =

South Korean baseball player (born 1993)

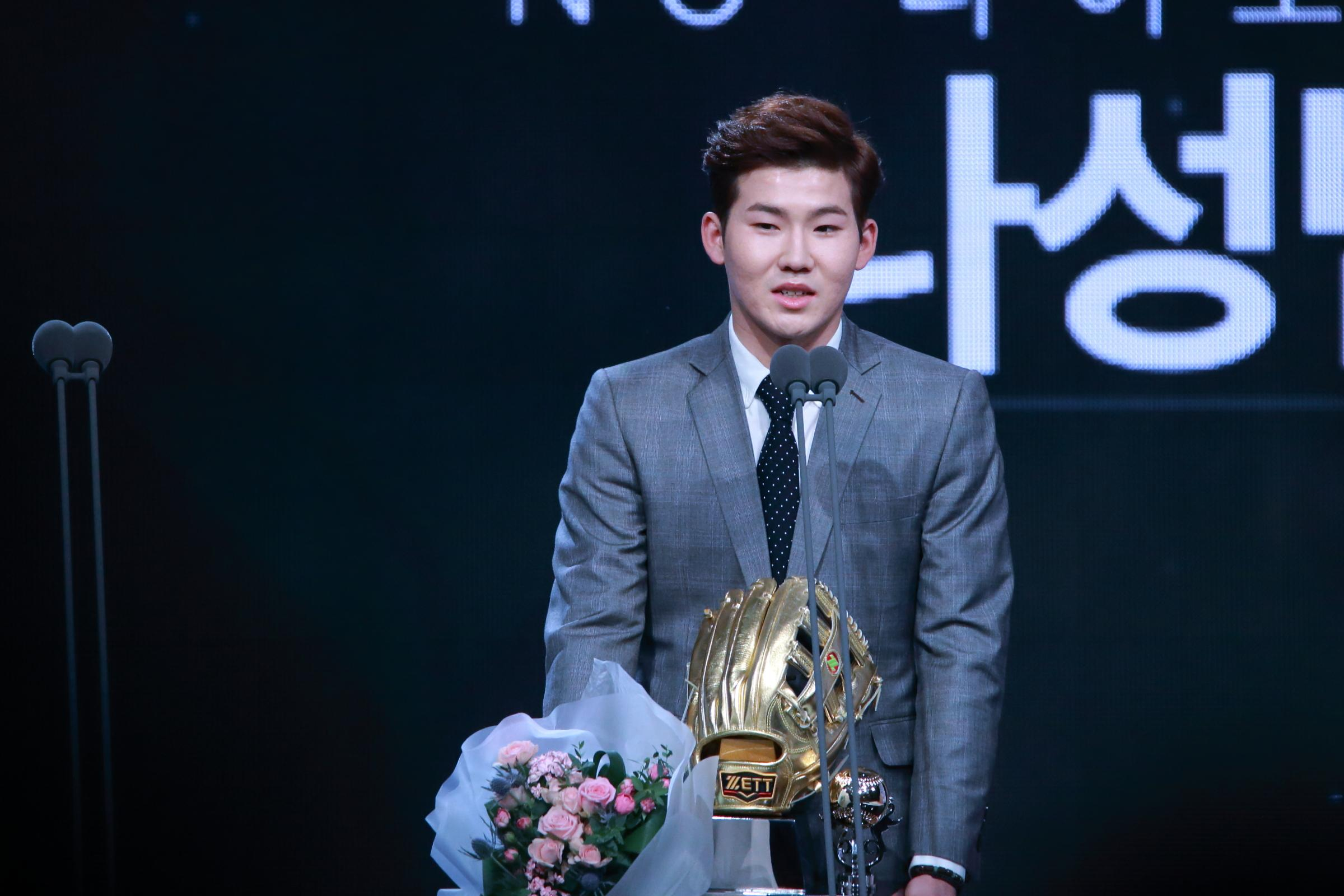

NC Dinos – No. 2
- Second baseman
- Born: February 6, 1993 (age 33)
- Bats: Left Throws: Right

KBO debut
- April 2, 2013, for the NC Dinos

KBO statistics (through June 4, 2024)
- Batting average: .318
- Hits: 1,379
- Home runs: 32
- Runs batted in: 451
- Stats at Baseball Reference

Teams
- NC Dinos (2013–present)

Career highlights and awards
- KBO Rookie of the Year (2014); Korean Series champion (2020); 2× KBO Golden Glove Award (2019–2020); 3× KBO All-Star (2019, 2025-2026); KBO Defensive Award (2025)

Park Min-woo (Korean: 박민우; Hanja: 朴珉宇; born February 6, 1993, in Seoul) is a South Korean baseball second baseman for the NC Dinos in the Korea Baseball Organization.

== Professional career ==
=== NC Dinos ===
In 2014, he batted .298 and scored 87 runs in 118 games, and ranked second in the league with 50 steals. He claimed the KBO League Rookie of the Year Award.

In 2015, he batted .304, 46 steals and scored 111 runs in 141 games.

In 2016, he batted .343, 20 steals and scored 84 runs in 121 games.

On July 16, 2021, Park was suspended the remainder of the season (72 games with 70 games left) after breaking COVID-19 social distancing rules.

== International career ==
He represented South Korea at the 2018 Asian Games.
