= Akiyoshi Katsuno =

Japanese baseball player (born 1997)

Akiyoshi Katsuno 勝野 昌慶
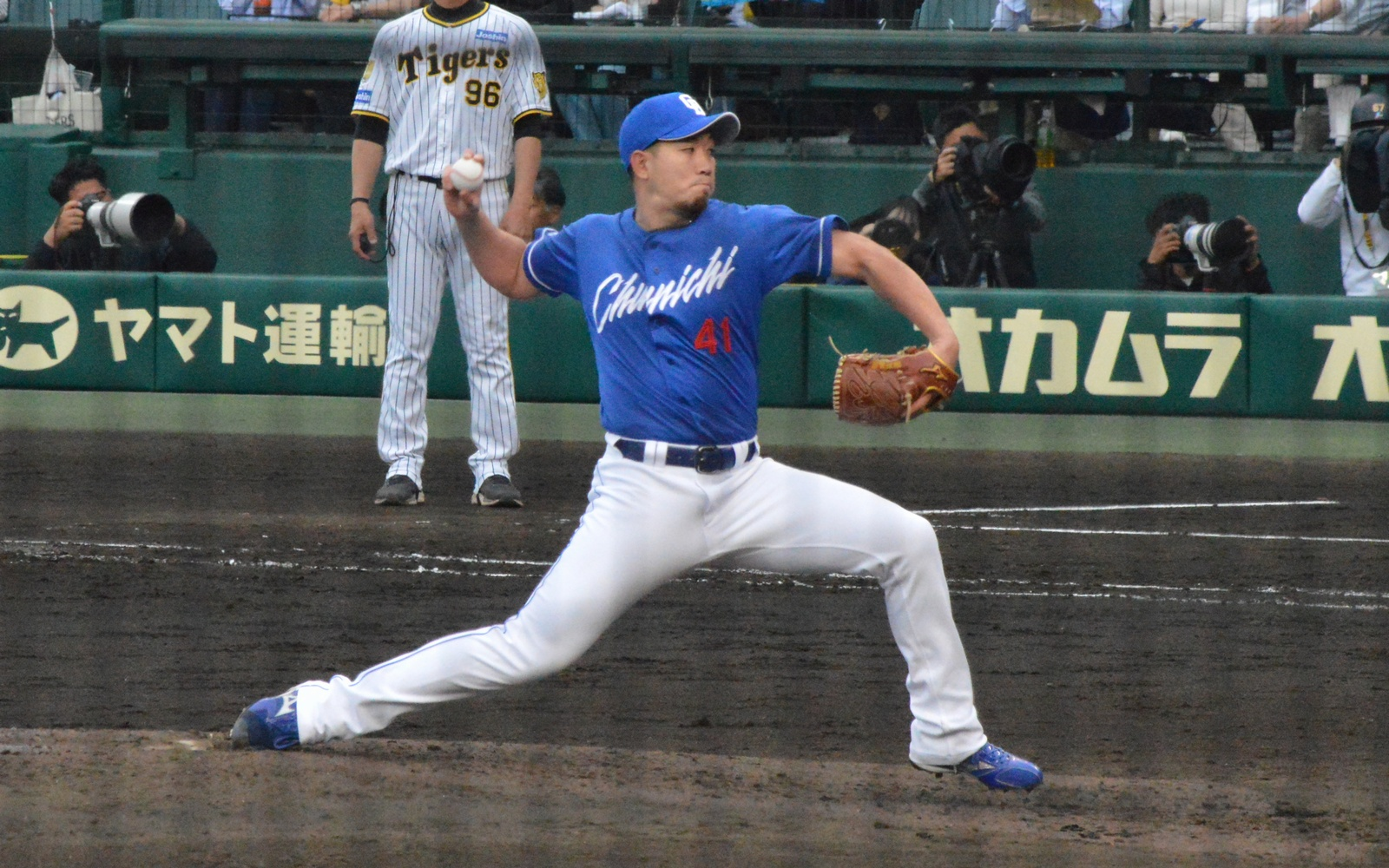
- Katsuno with the Chunichi Dragons

Chunichi Dragons – No. 41
- Pitcher
- Born: June 12, 1997 (age 29); Kani, Gifu, Japan
- Bats: Right Throws: Right

NPB debut
- May 17, 2019, for the Chunichi Dragons

NPB statistics (through 2024 season)
- Win–loss record: 14-20
- Earned run average: 3.51
- Strikeouts: 250
- Stats at Baseball Reference

Teams
- Chunichi Dragons (2019–present)

Akiyoshi Katsuno (勝野 昌慶, Katsuno Akiyoshi; born June 12, 1997) is a Japanese professional baseball pitcher for the Chunichi Dragons of Nippon Professional Baseball (NPB).

== Career ==
Katsuno is a graduate of Gifu Prefectural Toki Commercial High School and played for the industrial league team, Mitsubishi Heavy Industries, Nagoya where he led his team to their first All-Japan Championship in 2018. He was also selected in the all industrial league Japanese representative team at the 2018 Asian Games.

On 25 October 2018, Katsuno was selected as the 3rd draft pick for the Chunichi Dragons at the 2018 NPB Draft and on 21 November signed a provisional contract with a ¥65,000,000 sign-on bonus and a ¥12,000,000 yearly salary. He was presented with the number 41 jersey previously worn by 2011 MVP winning reliever, Takuya Asao.
