= Lee Yong-chan =

South Korean baseball player (born 1989)

Doosan Bears – No. 45
- Relief pitcher
- Born: January 2, 1989 (age 37)
- Bats: Right Throws: Right

KBO debut
- April 8, 2008, for the Doosan Bears

KBO statistics (through June 4, 2024)
- Win–loss record: 63–64
- Earned run average: 3.69
- Strikeouts: 790
- Saves: 167
- Stats at Baseball Reference

Teams
- Doosan Bears (2008–2014); Sangmu Baseball Team (2015–2016); Doosan Bears (2016–2020); NC Dinos (2021–2025); Doosan Bears 2026–present)

Career highlights and awards
- 2009 KBO League Rookie of the Year

Lee Yong-chan (Korean: 이용찬; Hanja: 李庸燦; born January 2, 1989) is a South Korean relief pitcher for the Doosan Bears of the KBO League. He bats and throws right-handed.

== Amateur career ==
Lee attended Jangchung High School in Seoul, South Korea. In 2006, he was selected for the South Korea national junior team that won the gold medal at the World Junior Baseball Championship in Cuba. Lee came on in relief and hurled three inning no-hitter with six strikeouts in a 9–0 victory over South Africa. He started Team Korea's fourth game of the round robin phase against Cuba, but allowed six runs and seven hits in just three innings.

== Professional career ==
=== Doosan Bears ===
Upon graduation from Jangchung High School in 2007, Lee joined the Doosan Bears, selected in the first round of the 2007 KBO Draft. However, he was sidelined the entire season after undergoing elbow surgery.

Lee was added to the 26-man first team roster of the Bears in the start of 2008 season, and posted a solid 1.23 ERA with 12 strikeouts, allowing two earned runs in eight games in April. On April 30, Lee earned his first professional win over the Kia Tigers, coming on relief and pitching 2.1 scoreless innings with two strikeouts. However, he was again placed on the disabled list in May when his elbow symptoms returned during a game, and didn't come up to the first team roster until the end of the season.

Lee had his best season as a closer in 2009 when he led the KBO league with a league-leading 26 saves, appearing in 51 games. He was regarded as an unconventional closer, however, as he didn't overwhelm hitters. Despite 19 saves and a 3.00 ERA before the All-Star break, he struggled the second half of the season when his ERA jumped to 4.98. Lee managed to rebound nicely from the slump in September, the final month of season, hurling 6.1 scoreless innings and racking 3 saves, but his final ERA (4.20) was the second-highest among the Top 10 closers of the 2009 KBO league.

Lee picked up his first save of the 2010 season on March 28 against the Kia Tigers and soon became the league's leading closer. He saved 11 consecutive games before he suffered his first blown save of the season on May 19 against the Hanwha Eagles. On September 6, 2010, Lee was arrested in Apgujeong-dong, Seoul on drunk driving charges after the police caught him in hit-and-run crash. He was pulled over and took a Breathalyzer test, which he failed. He was charged with misdemeanor driving while intoxicated. The Bears suspended him indefinitely later that day when media reports of the arrest surfaced.

In 2019, Lee made 26 starts for Doosan, registering a 7–10 record and 4.07 ERA with 102 strikeouts in 148 1/3 innings pitched.

=== NC Dinos ===
On June 1, 2023, South Korea baseball began an investigation of Lee and two other WBC pitchers (Kwang-hyun Kim and Jeong Cheol-won) for violating behavioral codes. The violation was a result of the three pitchers boozing during two nights of the tournament, and Lee was demoted to the minor leagues by NC as a result of the investigation.

== International career ==
He represented South Korea at the 2018 Asian Games.

Year	Venue	Competition	Team	Individual note
2006	Cuba	World Junior Baseball Championship	Gold medal	0–1, 6.00 ERA (2 G, 6.0 IP, 4 ER, 9 K)
