= Ryoga Tomiyama =

Japanese baseball player (born 1997)

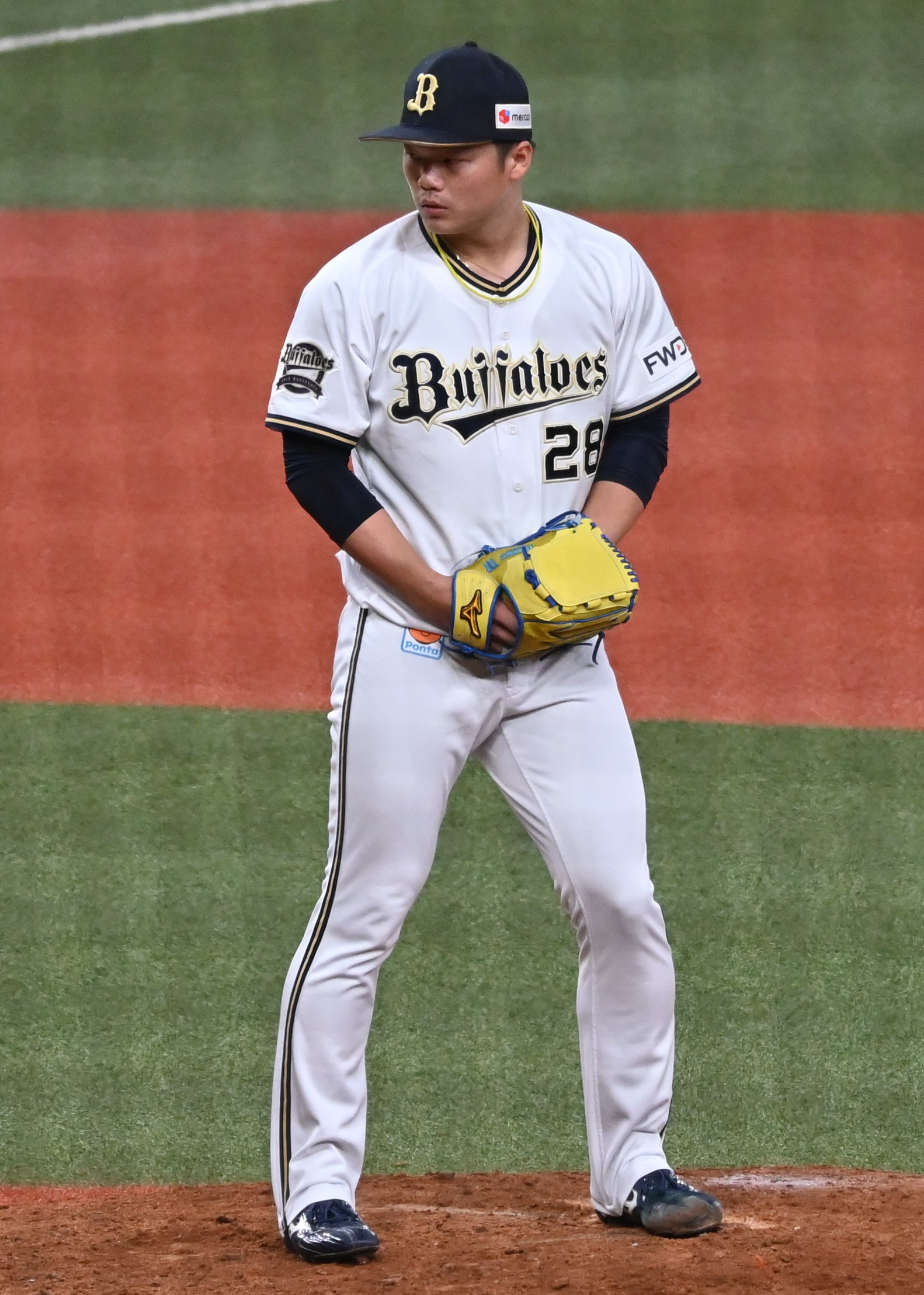

Orix Buffaloes – No. 28
- Pitcher
- Born: May 3, 1997 (age 28); Gobō, Wakayama, Japan
- Bats: Left Throws: Left

NPB debut
- September 26, 2019, for the Orix Buffaloes

Career statistics (through 2021 season)
- Win–loss record: 2-3
- Earned Run Average: 3.11
- Strikeouts: 51
- Saves: 0
- Holds: 23
- Stats at Baseball Reference

Teams
- Orix Buffaloes (2019–present)

Ryoga Tomiyama (富山 凌雅, Tomiyama Ryoga; born May 3, 1997 in Gobō, Wakayama, Japan) is a professional Japanese baseball player. He plays pitcher for the Orix Buffaloes.
