= Hai-Cheng Gong =

Chinese baseball player

Gong Haicheng

Shanghai Dragons – No. 17
- Pitcher
- Born: 28 December 1998 (age 27); Bengbu, Anhui, China
- Bats: Right Throws: Right
- Stats at Baseball Reference

Hai-Cheng Gong (Chinese: 宫海成; pinyin: Gōng Hǎichéng; born 28 December 1998) is a Chinese professional baseball pitcher for the Shanghai Dragons of Chinese Professional Baseball. He previously played for the Shanghai Golden Eagles.

== Career ==
On 16 May 2017, Gong was signed by the Pittsburgh Pirates organization to a minor league contract, becoming the second player to sign with an MLB club from that league's Mainland China development centres. He made his professional debut in 2018 with the GCL Pirates, posting a 5.40 ERA in 11 appearances. Gong split the 2019 season between the Low-A West Virginia Black Bears, the GCL Pirates, and the rookie-level Bristol Pirates, but struggled to an 0–2 record and 6.66 ERA in 14 games between the three teams. On 15 November 2019, Gong was released by the Pirates organization.

== International career ==
He represented China at the 2016 U18 Asian baseball tournament, 2017 World Baseball Classic and 2018 Asian Games.
