= Lee Jae-won (baseball) =

South Korean baseball player (born 1988)

Hanwha Eagles – No. 85
- Catcher/Coach
- Born: February 24, 1988 (age 38); Inchon, South Korea
- Bats: Right Throws: Right

KBO debut
- May 13, 2006, for the SK Wyverns

KBO statistics (through 2025)
- Batting average: .274
- Home runs: 110
- Runs batted in: 640
- Stats at Baseball Reference

Teams
- As player: SK Wyverns / SSG Landers (2006–2023); Hanwha Eagles (2024–2026); As coach: Hanwha Eagles (2027–present)

- Lee Jae-won
- Hangul: 이재원
- Hanja: 李宰元
- RR: I Jaewon
- MR: I Chaewŏn

Lee Jae-won (born February 24, 1988) is a retired South Korean professional baseball catcher for the Hanwha Eagles of the KBO League.

He represented South Korea at the 2018 Asian Games.

After the 2018 season, he became a free agent and stayed at 6.9 billion won in total for four years.

After the 2026 season, he is retired as catcher player for 18 years and becoming to be a coach.
