= Baseball at the 2015 Summer Universiade =

Baseball at the XXVIII Summer Universiade
- Venue: various
- Dates: July 6, 2015 – July 11, 2015
- Teams: 8 (men)

Medalists
1st place, gold medalist(s)		Japan, Chinese Taipei
3rd place, bronze medalist(s)		South Korea

Baseball was contested at the 2015 Summer Universiade from July 6 to 11 in Gwangju, South Korea. The tournament was only for men.

== Medal summary ==
=== Medal table ===
* Host nation (South Korea)

Rank	Nation	Gold	Silver	Bronze	Total
1	Chinese Taipei (TPE)	1	0	0	1
1	Japan (JPN)	1	0	0	1
3	South Korea (KOR)*	0	0	1	1
Totals (3 entries)		2	0	1	3

=== Medal events ===
Event	Gold	Silver	Bronze
Men	Japan (JPN); Chinese Taipei (TPE)		South Korea (KOR)

== Men ==
Eight teams participated in the men's tournament.

=== Teams ===
Pool A

- South Korea
- Japan
- China
- France

Pool B

- United States
- Chinese Taipei
- Czech Republic
- Mexico

== Group stage ==
=== Pool A ===
Team	Pld	W	L	RF	RA	Pct
Japan	3	3	0	27	0	1.000
South Korea	3	2	1	27	8	0.667
China	3	1	2	3	25	0.333
France	3	0	3	2	26	0

Date	Local time	Road team	Score	Home team	Inn.	Venue	Game duration	Attendance	Boxscore
July 6, 2015	12:00	China	3–2	France		Gwangju-Kia Champions Field			
July 6, 2015	18:00	South Korea	0–8	Japan		Gwangju-Kia Champions Field			
July 7, 2015	11:00	Japan	9–0	China	5	Mudeung Baseball Stadium			
July 8, 2015	17:00	Japan	10–0	France	7	Mudeung Baseball Stadium			
July 8, 2015	18:00	South Korea	14–0	China	7	Gwangju-Kia Champions Field			
July 9, 2015	18:00	France	0–13	South Korea	7	Gwangju-Kia Champions Field			

=== Pool B ===
Team	Pld	W	L	RF	RA	Pct
Chinese Taipei	3	3	0	19	7	1.000
United States	3	2	1	15	12	0.667
Czech Republic	3	1	2	15	10	0.333
Mexico	3	0	3	4	24	0

Date	Local time	Road team	Score	Home team	Inn.	Venue	Game duration	Attendance	Boxscore
July 6, 2015	11:00	Mexico	1–9	Chinese Taipei		Mudeung Baseball Stadium			
July 6, 2015	17:00	Czech Republic	4–5	United States		Mudeung Baseball Stadium			
July 8, 2015	11:00	Czech Republic	8–0	Mexico	5	Mudeung Baseball Stadium			
July 8, 2015	12:00	United States	3–5	Chinese Taipei	10	Gwangju-Kia Champions Field			
July 9, 2015	12:00	Mexico	3–7	United States		Gwangju-Kia Champions Field			
July 9, 2015	17:00	Chinese Taipei	5–3	Czech Republic		Mudeung Baseball Stadium			

== Final Stage ==
=== 5th ~ 8th Place ===
Semi-finals
July 10
Mexico	4
China	5
July 10
France	8
Czech Republic	10

Final
July 11
China	X
Czech Republic	X
Third place
July 11
Mexico	4
France	2

=== 1st ~ 4th Place ===
Semi-finals
July 10
United States	0
Japan	8
July 10
Chinese Taipei	2
South Korea	0

Final
July 11
Japan	X
Chinese Taipei	X
Third place
July 11
United States	6
South Korea	14

== Final standing ==
Rank	Team
1st place, gold medalist(s)	Japan; Chinese Taipei
2nd place, silver medalist(s)	None
3rd place, bronze medalist(s)	South Korea
4	United States
5	China; Czech Republic
7	Mexico
8	France
