= Takeshi Hosoyamada =

Japanese baseball player (born 1986)

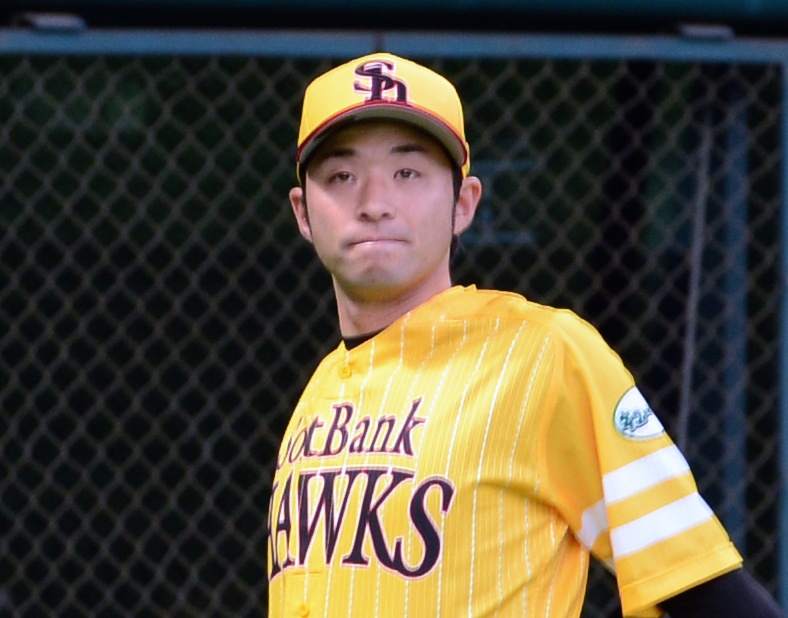
- Hosoyamada with the Fukuoka SoftBank Hawks
- Catcher
- Born: April 29, 1986 (age 39); Izumi, Kagoshima, Japan
- Bats: Right Throws: Right

debut
- April 4, 2009, for the Yokohama BayStars
- Stats at Baseball Reference

Teams
- Yokohama BayStars/Yokohama DeNA BayStars (2009–2013); Fukuoka SoftBank Hawks (2014–2015)

Takeshi Hosoyamada (細山田 武史, Hosoyamada Takeshi; born April 29, 1986 in Izumi, Kagoshima, Japan) is a professional Japanese baseball player. He plays catcher for the Fukuoka SoftBank Hawks.
