= 2012 Asian Baseball Championship =

Tournament details
- Country: Taiwan
- Dates: 28 November – 3 December
- Teams: 6
- Defending champions: Japan

Final positions
- Champions: Japan (17th title)
- Runners-up: Chinese Taipei
- Third place: South Korea
- Fourth place: China

The 2012 Asian Baseball Championship was an international baseball competition held in Taichung, Taiwan from November 28 to December 2, 2012. It was the 26th edition of the tournament. Qualification did not begin until after the completion of the 2012 London Olympics.

== Qualified Teams ==
- Chinese Taipei – Host and 2nd place of the 2009 Asian Baseball Championship
- China – 4th place of the 2009 Asian Baseball Championship
- Japan – 1st place of the 2009 Asian Baseball Championship
- Pakistan – 1st place of the 2012 Asia Cup Baseball South West Division
- Philippines – 1st place of the 2012 Asia Cup Baseball South East Division
- South Korea – 3rd place of the 2009 Asian Baseball Championship

== Results ==
Teams	Games Played	Wins	Losses	Final Rank
Japan	5	5	0	1
Chinese Taipei	5	4	1	2
South Korea	5	3	2	3
China	5	2	3	4
Philippines	5	1	4	5
Pakistan	5	0	5	6

=== Details ===
Match	Date	Local Time	Home Team	Score	Road Team	Venue	Notes
G1	11/28 (Wed)	12:00	South Korea	6 : 3	Philippines	Taichung Intercontinental Baseball Stadium	
G2	11/28 (Wed)	12:00	Pakistan	0 : 7	China	Taichung Baseball Field	Game ended after 5 innings due to rain
G3	11/28 (Wed)	18:30	Chinese Taipei	1 : 2	Japan	Taichung Intercontinental Baseball Stadium	Opening game
G4	11/29 (Thu)	12:00	China	0 : 4	South Korea	Taichung Intercontinental Baseball Stadium	
G5	11/29 (Thu)	14:00	Japan	13 : 0	Pakistan	Taichung Baseball Field	Mercy rule: 7 innings
G6	11/29 (Thu)	18:30	Philippines	1 : 12	Chinese Taipei	Taichung Intercontinental Baseball Stadium	Mercy rule: 8 innings
G7	11/30 (Fri)	12:00	Pakistan	0 : 5	South Korea	Taichung Intercontinental Baseball Stadium	After 3 innings, delayed the game to 19:00 and continued in Taichung Baseball Field
G8	11/30 (Fri)	14:00	Japan	1 : 0	Philippines	Taichung Baseball Field	Delayed for 3 hours and ended after 7 innings due to rain
G10	12/1 (Sat)	12:00	Pakistan	0 : 15	Chinese Taipei	Taichung Intercontinental Baseball Stadium	Mercy rule: 7 innings
G11	12/1 (Sat)	14:00	China	16 : 0	Philippines	Taichung Baseball Field	Mercy rule: 7 innings
G12	12/1 (Sat)	18:30	South Korea	0 : 4	Japan	Taichung Intercontinental Baseball Stadium	
G13	12/2 (Sun)	12:00	China	1 : 10	Japan	Taichung Intercontinental Baseball Stadium	
G14	12/2 (Sun)	14:00	Philippines	2 : 0	Pakistan	Taichung Baseball Field	
G15	12/2 (Sun)	18:30	Chinese Taipei	7 : 0	South Korea	Taichung Intercontinental Baseball Stadium	
G9	12/3 (Mon)	18:30	Chinese Taipei	3 : 1	China	Taichung Intercontinental Baseball Stadium	Originally planned for November 30, rescheduled to December 3rd due to rain

== See also ==
- List of sporting events in Taiwan
