= 2015 Asian Baseball Championship =

Baseball competition in Taiwan

Tournament details
- Country: Taiwan
- Dates: 16–20 September
- Teams: 6
- Defending champions: Japan

Final positions
- Champions: South Korea (7th title)
- Runners-up: Chinese Taipei
- Third place: Japan
- Fourth place: China

The 2015 Asian Baseball Championship was an international baseball competition that was held in Taichung, Taiwan from September 16–20, 2015. It was the 27th edition of the tournament.

South Korea won the title. Japan previously won five straight gold medals in the tournament since 2003.

== Qualified Teams ==
- Chinese Taipei – Host and 2nd place of the 2012 Asian Baseball Championship
- China – 4th place of the 2012 Asian Baseball Championship
- Japan – 1st place of the 2012 Asian Baseball Championship
- Pakistan – 1st place of the 2015 Asian Baseball Cup South West Division
- ~~Philippines – 1st place of the 2015 Asian Baseball Cup South East Division~~ (Note: The Philippines qualified for the tournament as winners of the Eastern Division of the 2015 Asian Baseball Cup but later withdrew due to financial and managerial issues faced by its national baseball association.)
- Indonesia – 2nd place of the 2015 Asian Baseball Cup South East Division*
- South Korea – 3rd place of the 2012 Asian Baseball Championship

== Results ==
Teams	Games Played	Wins	Losses	Final Rank
South Korea	5	5	0	1
Chinese Taipei	5	4	1	2
Japan	5	3	2	3
China	5	2	3	4
Pakistan	5	1	4	5
Indonesia	5	0	5	6

== See also ==
- List of sporting events in Taiwan
