= China national baseball team =

Men's baseball team

Information
- Country: People's Republic of China
- Federation: Chinese Baseball Association
- Confederation: WBSC Asia
- Manager: Li Wei
- Captain: Luo Jinjun
- Team Colors: Red, Yellow, White, Charcoal Gray

WBSC ranking
- Current: 18 ▼1 (26 March 2026)
- Highest: 17 (2 times; latest in 31 December 2025)
- Lowest: 30 (December 2022)

Olympic Games
- Appearances: 1 (first in 2008)
- Best result: 8th (2008)

World Baseball Classic
- Appearances: 5 (first in 2006)
- Best result: 11th (2009)

WBSC Premier12
- Appearances: 0

World Cup
- Appearances: 4 (first in 1998)
- Best result: 10th (2005)

Intercontinental Cup
- Appearances: 1 (first in 2002)
- Best result: 11th (2002)

Asian Games
- Appearances: 7 (first in 1994)
- Best result: 4th (7 times, most recent in 2018)

Asian Championship
- Appearances: 15 (first in 1985)
- Best result: (bronze) 3rd (2005, 2019)

The China national baseball team (simplified Chinese: 中国国家棒球队; traditional Chinese: 中國國家棒球隊; pinyin: Zhōngguó guójiā bàngqiú duì) also known as Red Dragons is the national representative team of the People's Republic of China. Their global record at the World Baseball Classic (WBC) stands at 2-14.

China has continued to develop its national programme through the Chinese Baseball Association, including an elite player academy partnership with Tianjin University of Sport. China also recorded a historic first win at the 2024 WBSC U-23 Baseball World Cup. In 2025, China finished 0–3 in the World Baseball Classic Qualifiers and missed the 2026 World Baseball Classic.

== Current roster ==
China roster – 2026 World Baseball Classic qualification
Players		Coaches
Pitchers: 38 Zhang Yanlun; 99 Hua Dancaireng; 27 Lin Yuyang; 32 Sun Guangxuan; 35 Sun Yicong; 10 Suo Xudi; 42 Wang Xiang; 11 Wu Haizheng; 18 Wu-Yelland Jeremy; 15 Yi Jian; 34 Zhang Mingxin; 1 Lun Zhao; 12 Zhao Wei; 37 Zhou Jie	Catchers: 9 Li Ning; 52 Wang Shuai; 55 Yi Zhou; Infielders: 25 Chen Jiaji; 40 Hu Tianyuan; 2 Lu Yun; 29 Luo Jinjun; 14 Wu Qirui; 7 Yang Jin; Outfielders: 4 Samuel Benjamin; 3 Du Nan; 6 Liang Pei; 43 Xing Wenbin; 51 Zhu Xudong	Manager: 66 Li Wei; Coaches: 67 Han Guojun; 21 Chang Ray; 56 Wang Wei; 57 Zhang Jun

== Technical staff ==
=== Current technical staff ===
Position	Name
Manager	(China) Wei Li
Bench Coach	(China) Guojun Han
Hitting Coach	(China) Ray Chang
Pitching Coach	(China) Jian Zhang
Bullpen Coach	(China) Wei Wang

== Results and fixtures ==
The following is a list of professional baseball match results currently active in the latest version of the WBSC World Rankings, as well as any future matches that have been scheduled.

Legend

Win Lose Void or postponed Fixture

=== 2019 ===
Asian Championship GS	14 October	South Korea	4–5 (F/10)	China	Taichung Stadium, Taiwan
Asian Championship GS	12:00 NST		Boxscore		Attendance: 200

Asian Championship GS	15 October	China	0–1	Philippines	Taichung Field, Taiwan
Asian Championship GS	18:30 NST		Boxscore		Attendance: 0

Asian Championship GS	16 October	Pakistan	1–11 (F/7)	China	Taichung Field, Taiwan
Asian Championship GS	12:00 NST		Boxscore		Attendance: 250

Asian Championship SR	18 October	China	1–11 (F/7)	Japan	Taichung Stadium, Taiwan
Asian Championship SR	12:00 NST		Boxscore		Attendance: 346

Asian Championship SR	19 October	Chinese Taipei	10–2	China	Taichung Stadium, Taiwan
Asian Championship SR	18:30 NST		Boxscore		Attendance: 0

Asian Championship 3rd	20 October	South Korea	6–8	China	Taichung Stadium, Taiwan
Asian Championship 3rd	12:00 NST		Boxscore		Attendance: 0

=== 2023 ===
World Baseball Classic GS	9 March	China	1–8	Japan	Tokyo Dome, Japan
World Baseball Classic GS	19:00 JT	LP: Wang Xiang (0–1)	Boxscore	WP: Shohei Ohtani (1–0)	Attendance: 41,616; Umpires: HP - Stu Scheurwater, 1B - Cuti Suarez, 2B - Ben May, 3B - Delfin Colon

World Baseball Classic GS	10 March	Czech Republic	8–5	China	Tokyo Dome, Japan
World Baseball Classic GS	12:00 JT	WP: Marek Minarik (1–0); HR: Matej Mensik (1), Martin Muzik (1)	Boxscore	LP: Hai-Cheng Gong (0–1)	Umpires: HP - Chan-Jung Chang, 1B - Pat Hoberg, 2B - Ben May, 3B - Fabrizio Fabrizzi

World Baseball Classic GS	11 March	China	2–12 (F/7)	Australia	Tokyo Dome, Japan
World Baseball Classic GS	12:00 JT	LP: Xin Qi (0–1)	Boxscore	WP: Kyle Glogoski (1–0); HR: Robbie Glendinning (2)	Umpires: HP – Adam Hamari, 1B – Chan-Jung Chang, 2B – Pat Hoberg, 3B – Delfin Colon

World Baseball Classic GS	13 March	South Korea	22–2 (F/5)	China	Tokyo Dome, Japan
World Baseball Classic GS	19:00 JT	WP: Hyeong Jun So (1–0); HR: Park Kun-woo (2), Ha-seong Kim (3)	Boxscore	LP: Alan Carter (0–1)	Attendance: 14,442; Umpires: HP – Stu Scheurwater, 1B – Adam Hamari, 2B – Chan-Jung Chang, 3B – Cuti Suarez

2022 Asian Games	October 1	Laos	0–15 (F/5)	China	Baseball & Softball Sports Center, Shaoxing, China
2022 Asian Games	12:00 CST	LP: To Tava	Boxscore	WP: Su Changlong	Umpires: HP - Shunichi Fukuzawa (JPN); 1B - Masataka Mino (JPN); 2B - Daenam Kim (KOR); 3B - Seungchul Lee (KOR)

2022 Asian Games	October 2	Philippines	0–2	China	Baseball & Softball Sports Center, Shaoxing, China
2022 Asian Games	12:00 CST	LP: Romeo Jasmin Jr.	Boxscore	WP: Li Ningji	Attendance: 8,500; Umpires: HP - Chen Te-jung (TPE); 1B - Lee Seungchul (KOR); 2B - Yoshino Hironori (JPN); 3B - Cheung Raymond (HKG)

2022 Asian Games	October 3	China	1–0	Japan	Baseball & Softball Sports Center, Shaoxing, China
2022 Asian Games	18:30 CST	WP: Xiang Wang; Sv: Chaoqun Zheng	Boxscore	LP: Shunya Morita	Umpires: HP - Chih-hao Li (TPE); 1B - Jihyun Cho (KOR); 2B - Raymond Cheung (HKG); 3B - Tim Wen (TPE)

2022 Asian Games – Super round	October 5	Chinese Taipei	4–1	China	Baseball & Softball Sports Center, Shaoxing, China
2022 Asian Games – Super round	18:30 CST	WP: Chen Po-yu; Sv: Gu Lin Ruei-yang	Boxscore	LP: Gan Quan	Umpires: HP - Shunichi Fukuzawa (JPN); 1B - Masataka Mino (JPN); 2B - Daenam Kim (KOR); 3B - Seungchul Lee (KOR)

2022 Asian Games – Super round	October 6	South Korea	8–1	China	Baseball & Softball Sports Center, Shaoxing, China
2022 Asian Games – Super round	12:00 CST	WP: Won Tae-in; HR: Kim Ju-won (1), Kang Baek-ho (1)	Boxscore	LP: Wang Weiyi	Umpires: HP - Chih-hao Li (TPE); 1B - Masataka Mino (JPN); 2B - Tim Wen (TPE); 3B - Shunichi Fukuzawa (JPN)

2022 Asian Games – Bronze medal match	October 7	Japan	4–3	China	Baseball & Softball Sports Center, Shaoxing, China
2022 Asian Games – Bronze medal match	12:00 CST	WP: Shuichiro Kayo	Boxscore	LP: Wang Xiang; HR: Kou Yongkang (1)	Umpires: HP - Daenam Kim (KOR); 1B - Chih-hao Li (TPE); 2B - Jihyun Cho (KOR); 3B - Tim Wen (TPE); LF - Te-jung Chen (TPE); RF - Seungchul Lee (KOR)

=== 2025 ===
World Baseball Classic Q	March 2	China	2–12 (F/7)	Germany	Kino Sports Complex, United States
World Baseball Classic Q	11:00 MST		Boxscore		Attendance: 1,549

World Baseball Classic Q	March 3	Colombia	8–1	China	Kino Sports Complex, United States
World Baseball Classic Q	18:00 MST		Boxscore		Attendance: 1,259

World Baseball Classic Q	March 4	China	2–12 (F/7)	Brazil	Kino Sports Complex, United States
World Baseball Classic Q	11:00 MST		Boxscore		Attendance: 3,566

Asian Championship GS	September 22	Pakistan	0–10 (F/8)	China	Pingtan International Baseball Stadium, Pingtan, China
Asian Championship GS	18:30 CST	LP: Khan Musharaf	Boxscore	WP: Qi Xin	Attendance: 1,600; Umpires: HP - Chanhui Lee (KOR); 1B - Te-jung Chen (TPE); 2B - Kazuyoshi Miyauchi (JPN); 3B - Roland Siacor (PHI)

Asian Championship GS	September 23	Philippines	2–4	China	Pingtan International Baseball Stadium, Pingtan, China
Asian Championship GS	12:30 CST	LP: Joshua Pineda	Boxscore	WP: Mi Jiahong	Attendance: 4,500; Umpires: HP - Kazuyoshi Miyauchi (JPN); 1B - Te-jung Chen (TPE); 2B - Chanhui Lee (KOR); 3B - Hsing-feng Lin (TPE)

Asian Championship GS	September 24	China	0–13 (F/7)	Japan	Pingtan International Baseball Stadium, Pingtan, China
Asian Championship GS	18:30 CST	LP: Wu Haizheng	Boxscore	WP: Kondo Kazuki	Attendance: 1,000; Umpires: HP - Te-jung Chen (TPE); 1B - Chanhui Lee (KOR); 2B - Yongil Kim (KOR); 3B - Roland Siacor (PHI)

Asian Championship SR	September 26	South Korea	8–6	China	Pingtan International Baseball Stadium, Pingtan, China
Asian Championship SR	12:30 CST	WP: Kim Jongun	Boxscore	LP: Wu Haizheng	Attendance: 800; Umpires: HP - Hsing-feng Lin (TPE); 1B - Katsutoshi Takahashi (JPN); 2B - Te-jung Chen (TPE); 3B - Patrick Ng (HKG)

Asian Championship SR	September 27	China	0–4	Chinese Taipei	Pingtan International Baseball Stadium, Pingtan, China
Asian Championship SR	12:30 CST	LP: Liu Guoqing	Boxscore	WP: Lu Meng-yang	Attendance: 1,550; Umpires: HP - Yongil Kim (KOR); 1B - Chanhui Lee (KOR); 2B - Patrick Ng (HKG); 3B - Le Zhuang (CHN)

Asian Championship 3rd	September 28	China	3–4	South Korea	Pingtan International Baseball Stadium, Pingtan, China
Asian Championship 3rd	12:30 CST	LP: Suo Xudi	Boxscore	WP: Yang Jaehun	Attendance: 2,000; Umpires: HP - Te-jung Chen (TPE); 1B - Katsutoshi Takahashi (JPN); 2B - Hsing-feng Lin (TPE); 3B - Kazuyoshi Miyauchi (JPN); LF - Roland Siacor (PHI); RF - Patrick Ng (HKG)

=== 2026 ===
Asian Games GS	September 21	China	v	Japan	Toyohashi Stadium, Japan
Asian Games GS	18:30 JST

Asian Games GS	September 22	Philippines	v	China	Toyohashi Stadium, Japan
Asian Games GS	12:00 JST

Asian Games GS	September 23	China	v	Palestine	Toyohashi Stadium, Japan
Asian Games GS	18:30 JST

WBSC Premier12 Q	November 26	Czech Republic	v	China	Panda Heritage Stadium, China
WBSC Premier12 Q	18:30 CST

WBSC Premier12 Q	November 27	China	v	Great Britain	Panda Heritage Stadium, China
WBSC Premier12 Q	18:30 CST

WBSC Premier12 Q	November 28	China	v	Nicaragua	Panda Heritage Stadium, China
WBSC Premier12 Q	18:30 CST

== Uniforms ==
Home
Away

== Olympic Games ==
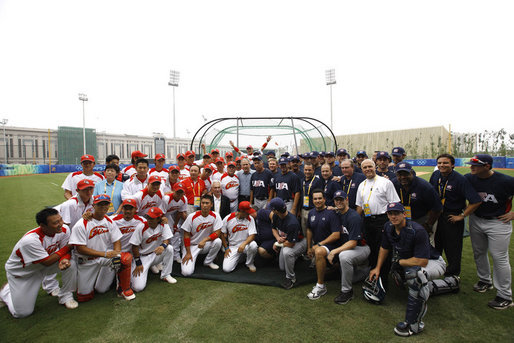
George W. Bush with the Chinese and American teams at the 2008 Summer Olympics

China secured qualification to the 2008 Summer Olympics automatically as host nation, giving the country its first Olympics berth.

== World Baseball Classic ==
World Baseball Classic record							Qualification record			
Year	Round	Position	W	L	RS	RA	W	L	RS	RA
(Japan) 2006	Round 1	15th	0	3	6	40	No qualifiers held			
(Japan) 2009	Round 1	11th	1	2	4	19	No qualifiers held			
(Japan) 2013	Round 1	13th	1	2	7	19	Automatically qualified			
(Japan) 2017	Round 1	16th	0	3	1	24	Automatically qualified			
(Japan) 2023	Round 1	20th	0	4	10	50	Automatically qualified			
2026	did not qualify						0	3	5	32
Total	Round 1	5/6	2	14	28	152	0	3	5	32

China competed in the inaugural 2006 World Baseball Classic and finished 15th in the tournament. It also competed in the 2009 World Baseball Classic, managed by Terry Collins. In the 2009 tournament, China recorded a 4–1 win over Chinese Taipei but was eliminated after losses to Japan and South Korea.

China World Baseball Classic Qualifiers record
Opponent	Tournaments met	W-L record	Largest victory		Largest defeat		Current streak
Opponent	Tournaments met	W-L record	Score	Tournament	Score	Tournament	Current streak
Brazil	1	0-1	-		12–2 (F/7)	United States 2026	L1
Colombia	1	0-1	-		8–1	United States 2026	L1
Germany	1	0-1	-		12–2 (F/7)	United States 2026	L1
Overall	1	0–3	–		Against BRA		L3
Overall	1	0–3	–		12–2 (F/7)	United States 2026	L3

== Results ==
=== International ===
Baseball World Cup

- 1936 to 1994 : did not enter
- 1998 : 12th
- 2001 : did not enter
- 2003 : 11th
- 2005 : 10th
- 2007 : did not enter
- 2009 : 22nd
- 2011 : did not enter

World Baseball Classic

- 2006 : 15th
- 2009 : 11th
- 2013 : 13th
- 2017 : 16th
- 2023 : 20th
- 2026 : did not qualify

Olympic Games

- 1992 to 2004 : did not qualify
- 2008 : 8th

Intercontinental Cup

- 1973 to 1999 : did not enter
- 2002 : 11th
- 2006 : did not enter
- 2010 : did not enter

=== Asian Baseball Championship ===
- 1954 to 1983 : did not enter
- 1985 : 5th
- 1987 : 6th
- 1989 : 4th
- 1991 : 6th
- 1993 : 5th
- 1995 : 4th
- 1997 : 4th
- 1999 : 4th
- 2001 : did not enter
- 2003 : 4th
- 2005 : (bronze) 3rd
- 2007 : did not enter
- 2009 : 4th
- 2012 : 4th
- 2015 : 4th
- 2017 : withdrew
- 2019 : (bronze) 3rd
- 2023 : withdrew
- 2025 : 4th

=== Asian Games ===
- 1994 : 4th
- 1998 : 4th
- 2002 : 4th
- 2006 : 4th
- 2010 : 4th
- 2014 : 4th
- 2018 : 4th
- 2022 : 4th
- 2026 :

=== East Asian Games ===
- 2013 : 4th

== Sources ==
- Baseball America
- 2006 World Baseball Classic
